= Birigui (footballer) =

Brazilian footballer

Personal information
- Full name: Marcos Antônio Gomes
- Date of birth: 1 April 1958 (age 68)
- Place of birth: Birigui, Brazil
- Position: Goalkeeper

Youth career
- –1977: Guarani

Senior career*
Years	Team	Apps	(Gls)
1977–1981	Guarani		
1981–1988	Santa Cruz		
1989–1990	Famalicão		
1990	Sport Recife		
1991	Santa Cruz		
1991–1992	Olímpia		
1993	União Barbarense		
1994	Velo Clube		
1995	Operário-MS		

International career
1977	Brazil U20		

Managerial career
- 1998–2000: Campinas
- 2001: Ituano
- 2002: União Barbarense
- 2003: Dom Bosco
- 2003: União Barbarense
- 2004: Operário-MT
- 2004: Juventude-MT
- 2004: Dom Bosco
- 2005–2006: Vila Aurora
- 2006–2007: Cacerense
- 2008: União Rondonópolis
- 2009: Barra
- 2009: Araguaia
- 2009–2011: Uberaba
- 2011: Rio Branco-ES
- 2011: Mixto
- 2012: União Rondonópolis
- 2012–2013: Cacerense
- 2013: Vilhena
- 2013–2014: Sorriso
- 2014: Vilhena
- 2014: Poconé
- 2015: Vilhena
- 2015: Poconé
- 2016–2017: Sinop
- 2017: Cacerense
- 2018: Real Ariquemes
- 2018: Olímpia
- 2020: Sinop
- 2022–2023: Cacerense
- 2023: Grêmio Sorriso
- * Club domestic league appearances and goals

Marcos Antônio Gomes (born 1 April 1958), better known as Birigui, is a Brazilian former professional footballer and manager, who played as a goalkeeper.

== Playing career ==
Graduated in the Guarani youth categories, Birigui was a substitute goalkeeper at the 1977 FIFA World Youth Championship. The club for which he stood out most during his career was Santa Cruz FC, where he made 257 appearances, being state champion in 1983, 1986 and 1987, and is considered the greatest goalkeeper of all time. He also played for Famalicão and clubs in the interior of the state of São Paulo.

== Managerial career ==
As a coach Birigui managed numerous clubs, especially in the state of Mato Grosso, where he was state champion in 2005 with Vila Aurora and in 2007 with Cacerense. He also won titles with Uberaba SC and Vilhena EC. In his latest work he has the help of his son, Marcos Menali, with whom he shared the coaching task. Alongside him, he finished runner-up in the 2022 second division with Cacerense.

== Honours ==
=== Player ===
Guarani

- Campeonato Brasileiro Série B: 1981

Santa Cruz

- Campeonato Pernambucano: 1983, 1986, 1987

=== Manager ===
Vila Aurora

- Campeonato Mato-Grossense: 2005

Cacerense

- Campeonato Mato-Grossense: 2007
- Copa Governador do Mato Grosso: 2006

Uberaba

- Taça Minas Gerais: 2009, 2010

Vilhena

- Campeonato Rondoniense: 2014
