= 2026 Copa do Brasil =

Tournament details
- Country: Brazil
- Dates: 17 February – 6 December
- Teams: 126

Tournament statistics
- Matches played: 154
- Goals scored: 337 (2.19 per match)
- Top goal scorer: Renê (6 goals)

The 2026 Copa do Brasil is the 38th edition of Brazil's domestic cup, the Copa do Brasil. It will be held from 17 February to 6 December 2026. Corinthians were the defending champions but they were eliminated in the round of 16 by Internacional.

For the first time the Copa do Brasil final will be played as a single match instead of over two legs. On 9 September 2026, the Brazilian Football Confederation announced that the final will be played in Brasília at the Estádio Nacional Mané Garrincha.

Originally named Copa Betano do Brasil 2026 for sponsorship reasons, the sponsorship ended due to the Provisional Measure 1394/2026 in September.

== Format ==
Due to its expansion, the 2026 Copa do Brasil will have five stages before the round of 16, with single-legged matches from the first to the fourth stage. From the fifth stage to the semi-finals, teams will play in a two-legged tie to decide which one will advance to the following round. The final will be played in a single match, with the host city having to comply with a stadium of at least 40,000 capacity, and having the structure to host the supporters of both clubs.

== Qualified teams ==
The number of qualified teams was expanded from 92 to 126 teams, with 102 direct spots from the state leagues and state cups (in the past season, 80 spots were given). Série A teams are automatically assured independently from their qualification in the state leagues or cups, and enter the competition in the fifth round. The champions of the 2025 Copa do Nordeste, 2025 Copa Verde, 2025 Série C and 2025 Série D enter in the third round.

Association	Team	Qualification method
Acre; 3 berths	Independência	2025 Campeonato Acreano champions
Acre; 3 berths	Galvez	2025 Campeonato Acreano runners-up
Acre; 3 berths	Vasco da Gama	2025 Campeonato Acreano 3rd place
Alagoas; 4 berths	CRB	2025 Campeonato Alagoano champions
Alagoas; 4 berths	ASA	2025 Campeonato Alagoano runners-up
Alagoas; 4 berths	Penedense	2025 Campeonato Alagoano 4th place
Alagoas; 4 berths	CSA	2025 Campeonato Alagoano play-off winners
Amapá; 3 berths	Trem	2025 Campeonato Amapaense champions
Amapá; 3 berths	Oratório	2025 Campeonato Amapaense runners-up
Amapá; 3 berths	Independente	2025 Campeonato Amapaense 3rd place
Amazonas; 4 berths	Amazonas	2025 Campeonato Amazonense champions
Amazonas; 4 berths	Nacional	2025 Campeonato Amazonense runners-up
Amazonas; 4 berths	Manaus	2025 Campeonato Amazonense 3rd place
Amazonas; 4 berths	Manauara	2025 Campeonato Amazonense 4th place
Bahia; 4 + 2 berths	Bahia	2026 Série A participant
Bahia; 4 + 2 berths	Vitória	2026 Série A participant
Bahia; 4 + 2 berths	Jacuipense	2025 Campeonato Baiano 3rd place
Bahia; 4 + 2 berths	Atlético de Alagoinhas	2025 Campeonato Baiano 4th place
Bahia; 4 + 2 berths	Porto	2025 Campeonato Baiano 5th place
Bahia; 4 + 2 berths	Juazeirense	2025 Campeonato Baiano 6th place
Ceará; 4 berths	Ceará	2025 Campeonato Cearense champions
Ceará; 4 berths	Fortaleza	2025 Campeonato Cearense runners-up
Ceará; 4 berths	Maracanã	2025 Campeonato Cearense 3rd place
Ceará; 4 berths	Tirol	2025 Copa Fares Lopes runners-up
Distrito Federal; 3 berths	Gama	2025 Campeonato Brasiliense champions
Distrito Federal; 3 berths	Capital	2025 Campeonato Brasiliense runners-up
Distrito Federal; 3 berths	Ceilânida	2025 Campeonato Brasiliense 3rd place
Espírito Santo; 3 berths	Rio Branco	2025 Campeonato Capixaba champions
Espírito Santo; 3 berths	Porto Vitória	2025 Campeonato Capixaba runners-up
Espírito Santo; 3 berths	Desportiva Ferroviária	2025 Campeonato Capixaba 3rd place
Goiás; 4 berths	Vila Nova	2025 Campeonato Goiano champions
Goiás; 4 berths	Anápolis	2025 Campeonato Goiano runners-up
Goiás; 4 berths	Atlético Goianiense	2025 Campeonato Goiano 3rd place
Goiás; 4 berths	Goiás	2025 Campeonato Goiano 4th place
Maranhão; 3 berths	Maranhão	2025 Campeonato Maranhense champions
Maranhão; 3 berths	Imperatriz	2025 Campeonato Maranhense runners-up
Maranhão; 3 berths	IAPE	2025 Campeonato Maranhense 3rd place
Mato Grosso; 4 berths	Primavera	2025 Campeonato Mato-Grossense champions
Mato Grosso; 4 berths	Cuiabá	2025 Campeonato Mato-Grossense runners-up
Mato Grosso; 4 berths	Mixto	2025 Campeonato Mato-Grossense 3rd place
Mato Grosso; 4 berths	CEOV	2025 Campeonato Mato-Grossense 4th place
Mato Grosso do Sul; 3 berths	Operário	2025 Campeonato Sul-Mato-Grossense champions
Mato Grosso do Sul; 3 berths	Ivinhema	2025 Campeonato Sul-Mato-Grossense runners-up
Mato Grosso do Sul; 3 berths	Pantanal	2025 Campeonato Sul-Mato-Grossense 3rd place
Minas Gerais; 5 + 2 berths	Cruzeiro	2026 Série A participant
Minas Gerais; 5 + 2 berths	Atlético Mineiro	2026 Série A participant
Minas Gerais; 5 + 2 berths	América Mineiro	2025 Campeonato Mineiro runners-up
Minas Gerais; 5 + 2 berths	Tombense	2025 Campeonato Mineiro 3rd place
Minas Gerais; 5 + 2 berths	Athletic	2025 Campeonato Mineiro 5th place
Minas Gerais; 5 + 2 berths	Uberlândia	2025 Campeonato Mineiro 6th place
Minas Gerais; 5 + 2 berths	Betim	2025 Campeonato Mineiro 7th place
Pará; 4 + 2 berths	Remo	2026 Série A participant
Pará; 4 + 2 berths	Paysandu	2025 Copa Verde champions
Pará; 4 + 2 berths	Tuna Luso	2025 Campeonato Paraense 3rd place
Pará; 4 + 2 berths	Bragantino	2025 Campeonato Paraense 5th place
Pará; 4 + 2 berths	Castanhal	2025 Campeonato Paraense 6th place
Pará; 4 + 2 berths	Águia de Marabá	2025 Copa Grão-Pará champions
Paraíba; 3 berths	Sousa	2025 Campeonato Paraibano champions
Paraíba; 3 berths	Botafogo	2025 Campeonato Paraibano runners-up
Paraíba; 3 berths	Serra Branca	2025 Campeonato Paraibano 3rd place
Paraná; 5 + 2 berths	Athletico Paranaense	2026 Série A participant
Paraná; 5 + 2 berths	Coritiba	2026 Série A participant
Paraná; 5 + 2 berths	Operário Ferroviário	2025 Campeonato Paranaense champions
Paraná; 5 + 2 berths	Maringá	2025 Campeonato Paranaense runners-up
Paraná; 5 + 2 berths	Londrina	2025 Campeonato Paranaense 3rd place
Paraná; 5 + 2 berths	Cianorte	2025 Campeonato Paranaense 6th place
Paraná; 5 + 2 berths	Azuriz	2025 Taça FPF runners-up
Pernambuco; 4 berths	Sport	2025 Campeonato Pernambucano champions
Pernambuco; 4 berths	Retrô	2025 Campeonato Pernambucano runners-up
Pernambuco; 4 berths	Santa Cruz	2025 Campeonato Pernambucano 3rd place
Pernambuco; 4 berths	Maguary	2025 Campeonato Pernambucano 4th place
Piauí; 3 berths	Piauí	2025 Campeonato Piauiense champions
Piauí; 3 berths	Fluminense	2025 Campeonato Piauiense runners-up
Piauí; 3 berths	Altos	2025 Campeonato Piauiense 3rd place
Rio de Janeiro; 6 + 4 berths	Flamengo	2026 Série A participant
Rio de Janeiro; 6 + 4 berths	Botafogo	2026 Série A participant
Rio de Janeiro; 6 + 4 berths	Fluminense	2026 Série A participant
Rio de Janeiro; 6 + 4 berths	Vasco da Gama	2026 Série A participant
Rio de Janeiro; 6 + 4 berths	Volta Redonda	2025 Campeonato Carioca 3rd place
Rio de Janeiro; 6 + 4 berths	Sampaio Corrêa	2025 Campeonato Carioca 5th place
Rio de Janeiro; 6 + 4 berths	Madureira	2025 Campeonato Carioca 6th place
Rio de Janeiro; 6 + 4 berths	Nova Iguaçu	2025 Campeonato Carioca 7th place
Rio de Janeiro; 6 + 4 berths	Boavista	2025 Campeonato Carioca 8th place
Rio de Janeiro; 6 + 4 berths	Portuguesa	2025 Copa Rio champions
Rio Grande do Norte; 3 berths	América de Natal	2025 Campeonato Potiguar champions
Rio Grande do Norte; 3 berths	ABC	2025 Campeonato Potiguar runners-up
Rio Grande do Norte; 3 berths	Laguna	2025 Campeonato Potiguar 3rd Palace
Rio Grande do Sul; 5 + 2 berths	Grêmio	2026 Série A participant
Rio Grande do Sul; 5 + 2 berths	Internacional	2026 Série A participant
Rio Grande do Sul; 5 + 2 berths	Juventude	2025 Campeonato Gaúcho 3rd place
Rio Grande do Sul; 5 + 2 berths	Caxias	2025 Campeonato Gaúcho 4th place
Rio Grande do Sul; 5 + 2 berths	Ypiranga	2025 Campeonato Gaúcho 5th place
Rio Grande do Sul; 5 + 2 berths	São Luiz	2025 Campeonato Gaúcho 6th place
Rio Grande do Sul; 5 + 2 berths	Guarany de Bagé	2025 Campeonato Gaúcho 7th place
Rondônia; 3 berths	Porto Velho	2025 Campeonato Rondoniense champions
Rondônia; 3 berths	Guaporé	2025 Campeonato Rondoniense runners-up
Rondônia; 3 berths	Ji-Paraná	2025 Campeonato Rondoniense 3rd place
Roraima; 3 berths	GAS	2025 Campeonato Roraimense champions
Roraima; 3 berths	Monte Roraima	2025 Campeonato Roraimense runners-up
Roraima; 3 berths	Baré	2025 Campeonato Roraimense 3rd place
Santa Catarina; 4 + 2 berths	Chapecoense	2026 Série A participant
Santa Catarina; 4 + 2 berths	Barra	2025 Série D champions
Santa Catarina; 4 + 2 berths	Avaí	2025 Campeonato Catarinense champions
Santa Catarina; 4 + 2 berths	Santa Catarina	2025 Campeonato Catarinense 3rd place
Santa Catarina; 4 + 2 berths	Joinville	2025 Campeonato Catarinense 4th place
Santa Catarina; 4 + 2 berths	Figueirense	2025 Copa Santa Catarina champions
São Paulo; 6 + 7 berths	Palmeiras	2026 Série A participant
São Paulo; 6 + 7 berths	Mirassol	2026 Série A participant
São Paulo; 6 + 7 berths	São Paulo	2026 Série A participant
São Paulo; 6 + 7 berths	Red Bull Bragantino	2026 Série A participant
São Paulo; 6 + 7 berths	Corinthians	2026 Série A participant
São Paulo; 6 + 7 berths	Santos	2026 Série A participant
São Paulo; 6 + 7 berths	Ponte Preta	2025 Série C champions
São Paulo; 6 + 7 berths	São Bernardo	2025 Campeonato Paulista 5th place
São Paulo; 6 + 7 berths	Novorizontino	2025 Campeonato Paulista 6th place
São Paulo; 6 + 7 berths	Guarani	2025 Campeonato Paulista 10th place
São Paulo; 6 + 7 berths	Velo Clube	2025 Campeonato Paulista 11th place
São Paulo; 6 + 7 berths	Portuguesa	2025 Campeonato Paulista 12th place
São Paulo; 6 + 7 berths	Primavera	2025 Copa Paulista runners-up
Sergipe; 3 + 1 berths	Confiança	2025 Copa do Nordeste runners-up (Note: Confiança inherited the spot after Bahia assured qualification as a participant of the 2026 Série A)
Sergipe; 3 + 1 berths	Itabaiana	2025 Campeonato Sergipano runners-up
Sergipe; 3 + 1 berths	Lagarto	2025 Campeonato Sergipano 3rd place
Sergipe; 3 + 1 berths	América de Propriá	2025 Campeonato Sergipano 4th place
Tocantins; 3 berths	Araguaína	2025 Campeonato Tocantinense finalist
Tocantins; 3 berths	Tocantinópolis	2025 Campeonato Tocantinense finalist
Tocantins; 3 berths	Capital	2025 Campeonato Tocantinense 3rd place

== Schedule ==
On 7 January 2026, CBF published the 2026 Copa do Brasil schedule:

Round	Format	Dates	Fixtures	Clubs remaining	New entries	New teams	Prize money
First round	Single-legged	17–19 February	14	126 → 112	Lowered-teams in the CBF club ranking	28	All teams: R$ 400,000
Second round	Single-legged	Week 1: 25–26 February; Week 2: 4–5 March	44	112 → 68	Clubs qualified from state leagues or state cups (excluding those already in the first round)	74	Série B teams: R$ 1,380,000; Other teams: R$ 830,000
Third round	Single-legged	11–12 March	24	68 → 44	2025 Série C, 2025 Série D, 2025 Copa Verde and 2025 Copa do Nordeste champions	4	Série B teams: R$ 1,530,000; Other teams: R$ 950,000
Fourth round	Single-legged	18–19 March	12	44 → 32	None	0	Série B teams: R$ 1,680,000; Other teams: R$ 1,070,000
Fifth round	Double-legged	First leg: 22–23 April; Second leg: 13–14 May	16	32 → 16	2026 Série A participants	20	All teams: R$ 2,000,000
Round of 16	Double-legged	First leg: 1–2 August; Second leg: 5–6 August	8	16 → 8	None	0	All teams: R$ 3,000,000
Quarter-finals	Double-legged	First leg: 26–27 August; Second leg: 2–3 September	4	8 → 4	None	0	All teams: R$ 4,000,000
Semi-finals	Double-legged	First leg: 1 November; Second leg: 8 November	2	4 → 2	None	0	All teams: R$ 9,000,000
Final	Single-legged	6 December	1	2 → 1	None	0	Champions: R$ 78,000,000; Runners-up: R$ 34,000,000

== Single-legged rounds ==
The draw for the first and second rounds was held on 28 January 2026 at the CBF headquarters in Rio de Janeiro.

=== First round ===
In the first round, the 28 worst-placed teams in the CBF club ranking entered the competition. Teams with the best positions in ranking hosted the match, and faced the worst-ranked ones. In case of one or more teams have the same position in the ranking, the CBF federation ranking defined those who have the best places. In case of equality in both rankings, the final standings of the qualification method was used to define places.

Draw

Each CBF team's ranking is shown in parentheses.

Best-ranked	Worst-ranked
Ji-Paraná (209); Independente-AP (209); Madureira (217); Gama (217); Galvez (217); Velo Clube (no rank); Primavera-SP (no rank); Sampaio Corrêa-RJ (no rank); Betim (no rank); Tirol (no rank); Santa Catarina (no rank); Porto-BA (no rank); Maguary (no rank); Bragantino-PA (no rank)	Primavera-MT (no rank); Laguna (no rank); Serra Branca (no rank); IAPE (no rank); América de Propriá (no rank); Piauí (no rank); Desportiva (no rank); Araguaína (no rank); Vasco da Gama-AC (no rank); Guaporé (no rank); Monte Roraima (no rank); Baré (no rank); Ivinhema (no rank); Pantanal (no rank)

==== Matches ====
18 February 2026 G1	Ji-Paraná	2–0	Pantanal	Ji-Paraná
20:30	Palacios 14'; Lelo 49'	Report		Stadium: Biancão; Attendance: 1,429; Referee: Yuri Elino Ferreira da Cruz (Rio de Janeiro)

18 February 2026 G2	Ivinhema	1–0	Independente-AP	Ivinhema
20:30	Diogo Fogliato 83'	Report		Stadium: Saraivão; Attendance: 1,026; Referee: Edina Alves Batista (São Paulo)

18 February 2026 G3	Baré	0–3	Madureira	Boa Vista
17:00		Report	Vinícius 4'; Ricardo 20'; Filipe Claudino 67'	Stadium: Canarinho; Attendance: 941; Referee: André Luiz Skettino Policarpo Bento (Minas Gerais)

18 February 2026 G4	Gama	2–0	Monte Roraima	Gama
20:00	Russo 23'; David Coelho 28'	Report		Stadium: Bezerrão; Attendance: 9,930; Referee: João Vitor Gobi (São Paulo)

18 February 2026 G5	Galvez	1–1 (2–3 p)	Guaporé	Rio Branco
21:00	David 41'	Report	Watthimen 79'	Stadium: Arena da Floresta; Attendance: 1,429; Referee: Fernando Antônio Mendes de Salles Nascimento Filho (Pará)

19 February 2026 G6	Vasco da Gama-AC	1–1 (2–3 p)	Velo Clube	Rio Branco
21:00	Jean 38'	Report	Ruan 62'	Stadium: Arena da Floresta; Attendance: 767; Referee: Maguielson Lima Barbosa (Federal District)

18 February 2026 G7	Araguaína	0–3	Primavera-SP	Araguaína
19:30		Report	Luiz Fernando 18'; Josiel 57'; Hilton 90+3'	Stadium: Mirandão; Attendance: 1,301; Referee: Bruno Pereira Vasconcelos (Bahia)

17 February 2026 G8	Sampaio Corrêa-RJ	1–1 (1–3 p)	Desportiva	Saquarema
20:00	Octávio 87' (pen.)	Report	Tiago 70'	Stadium: Lourival Gomes; Attendance: 483; Referee: Lucas Casagrande (Paraná)

18 February 2026 G9	Betim	1–0	Piauí	Betim
20:00	Vitinho 15'	Report		Stadium: Arena URBSAN; Attendance: 2,973; Referee: Jonathan Benkenstein Pinheiro (Rio Grande do Sul)

18 February 2026 G10	América de Propriá	1–1 (3–5 p)	Tirol	Aracaju
20:00	Wallace 34'	Report	Ytalo 90+1'	Stadium: Batistão; Attendance: 203; Referee: Paulo Belence Alves dos Prazeres Filho (Pernambuco)

18 February 2026 G11	Santa Catarina	2–0	IAPE	Rio do Sul
20:00	Alex 48'; Renan 66'	Report		Stadium: Alfredo João Krieck; Attendance: 1,949; Referee: Jefferson Ferreira de Moraes (Goiás)

18 February 2026 G12	Porto-BA	2–1	Serra Branca	Porto Seguro
16:00	Liborge 90'; Cesinha 90+7'	Report	Igor 31'	Stadium: Arena Porto; Attendance: 710; Referee: Thaillan Azevedo Gomes (Amapá)

18 February 2026 G13	Maguary	1–0	Laguna	Bonito
16:30	Julio César 36' (pen.)	Report		Stadium: Arthusão; Attendance: 746; Referee: Afro Rocha de Carvalho Filho (Paraíba)

19 February 2026 G14	Primavera-MT	2–1	Bragantino-PA	Primavera do Leste
20:00	Montefiori 15', 27'	Report	Almeida 12'	Stadium: Cerradão; Attendance: 1,368; Referee: Denis da Silva Ribeiro Serafim (Alagoas)

=== Second round ===
Draw

Each CBF team's ranking is shown in parentheses.

Pot A	Pot B	Pot C	Pot D
Fortaleza (13); Juventude (17); Atlético Goianiense (18); América Mineiro (19); Ceará (21); Cuiabá (22); Goiás (23); Sport (25); CRB (26); Vila Nova (29); Operário Ferroviário (30)	Avaí (31); Novorizontino (32); CSA (39); Amazonas (40); Tombense (42); Volta Redonda (43); Guarani (45); ABC (46); Londrina (48); Retrô (49); Ypiranga-RS (50)	Athletic (51); Botafogo-PB (52); Maringá (56); São Bernardo (57); Caxias (58); Figueirense (59); América de Natal (62); Manaus (64); Altos (65); Nova Iguaçu (66); Águia de Marabá (67)	Anápolis (69); Sousa (70); Tocantinópolis (71); ASA (74); Porto Velho (75); Ceilândia (77); Portuguesa-RJ (78); Trem (80); Juazeirense (83); Itabaiana (84); Maranhão (85)
Pot E	Pot F	Pot G	Pot H
Santa Cruz (86); Tuna Luso (87); Maracanã (89); Cianorte (90); Operário-MS (93); Jacuipense (94); Capital-DF (95); Fluminense-PI (97); São Luiz (98); CEOV (102); Manauara (103)	Azuriz (111); Rio Branco-ES (112); Boavista (113); GAS (114); Guarany de Bagé (116); Mixto (119); Portuguesa (121); Atlético de Alagoinhas (123); Lagarto (127); Capital-TO (130); Independência (132)	Joinville (136); Uberlândia (143); Imperatriz (144); Penedense (161); Porto Vitória (161); Castanhal (170); Nacional-AM (185); Oratório (198); Ji-Paraná (209); Ivinhema (no rank); Madureira (217)	Gama (217); Guaporé (no rank); Velo Clube (no rank); Primavera-SP (no rank); Desportiva (no rank); Betim (no rank); Tirol (no rank); Santa Catarina (no rank); Porto-BA (no rank); Maguary (no rank); Primavera-MT (no rank)

==== Matches ====
4 March 2026 G15	América Mineiro	1–1 (4–3 p)	Tirol	Belo Horizonte
21:30	Willian 61'	Report	Welton 63'	Stadium: Independência; Attendance: 1,030; Referee: Kléber Ariel Gonçalves Silva (Paraná)

4 March 2026 G16	Ivinhema	2–4	Volta Redonda	Ivinhema
20:30	Ninho 19'; Wendel 39'	Report	Ygor Catatau 87', 90+4'; Dener 90+5'; Fellipe 90+7'	Stadium: Saraivão; Attendance: 2,086; Referee: Jackson Rodrigues da Silva (Acre)

24 February 2026 G17	América de Natal	3–0	GAS	Natal
21:30	Cassiano 37'; Souza 45' (pen.); Alexandre Aruá 64'	Report		Stadium: Arena das Dunas; Attendance: 5,584; Referee: Paulo Roberto Alves Júnior (Paraná)

25 February 2026 G18	Anápolis	3–1	Cianorte	Anápolis
19:30	Gustavo Henrique 43'; Matheus Lagoa 53', 90' (pen.)	Report	Manaus 60'	Stadium: Jonas Duarte; Attendance: 1,399; Referee: Emerson Souza Silva (Bahia)

5 March 2026 G19	Desportiva	0–0 (3–4 p)	Sport	Cariacica
19:00		Report		Stadium: Kleber Andrade; Attendance: 6,433; Referee: Sávio Pereira Sampaio (Federal District)

25 February 2026 G20	Ypiranga-RS	2–0	Ji-Paraná	Erechim
20:00	Renan Gorne 18', 30'	Report		Stadium: Colosso da Lagoa; Attendance: 941; Referee: Léo Simão Holanda (Ceará)

4 March 2026 G21	Rio Branco-ES	1–1 (5–6 p)	Athletic	Cariacica
20:00	Carlinhos 36'	Report	Lucas Belezi 6'	Stadium: Kleber Andrade; Attendance: 4,153; Referee: João Vitor Gobi (São Paulo)

4 March 2026 G22	Manauara	3–1	Itabaiana	Manaus
21:00	Marinho 5'; João Guilherme 37'; Pablo Pardal 46'	Report	Pedro Igor 29'	Stadium: Arena da Amazônia; Attendance: 559; Referee: Yuri Elino Ferreira da Cruz (Rio de Janeiro)

24 February 2026 G23	Fortaleza	4–3	Maguary	Fortaleza
21:30	Luiz Fernando 15'; Cardona 45+3'; Rodrigo Santos 82'; Lucca Prior 90+4'	Report	Júlio César 41'; Kanu 45+5'; Eduardo 64'	Stadium: Castelão; Attendance: 5,097; Referee: Márcio dos Santos Oliveira (Alagoas)

25 February 2026 G24	Castanhal	1–1 (5–4 p)	Guarani	Castanhal
15:30	Daniel 6'	Report	Lucca 22'	Stadium: Modelão; Attendance: 1,968; Referee: Afro Rocha de Carvalho Filho (Paraíba)

4 March 2026 G25	Nova Iguaçu	1–1 (4–3 p)	Lagarto	Rio de Janeiro
19:00	Lucas Cruz 19'	Report	Erik 30'	Stadium: Luso Brasileiro; Attendance: 160; Referee: Gustavo Ervino Bauermann (Santa Catarina)

25 February 2026 G26	Ceilândia	1–1 (1–4 p)	Jacuipense	Ceilândia
19:45	Marquinho 64'	Report	Thiaguinho 35'	Stadium: Abadião; Attendance: 900; Referee: Lucas Canetto Bellote (São Paulo)

4 March 2026 G27	Santa Catarina	1–1 (5–4 p)	Cuiabá	Rio do Sul
20:00	Alex 90+5'	Report	Vinícius Peixoto 24'	Stadium: Alfredão; Attendance: 3,585; Referee: Wagner do Nascimento Magalhães (Rio de Janeiro)

25 February 2026 G28	Novorizontino	4–0	Nacional-AM	Novo Horizonte
18:00	Jardiel 52'; Vinícius Paiva 71'; Rômulo 82' (pen.); Matheus Bianqui 85'	Report		Stadium: Jorge de Biasi; Attendance: 1,330; Referee: Tarcísio Flores da Silva (Rio Grande do Norte)

25 February 2026 G29	Mixto	1–1 (4–3 p)	Botafogo-PB	Cuiabá
21:00	Esquerdinha 16'	Report	Márcio Silva 49'	Stadium: Dutrinha; Attendance: 1,171; Referee: Jonathan Benkenstein Pinheiro (Rio Grande do Sul)

25 February 2026 G30	São Luiz	0–1	Maranhão	Ijuí
19:00		Report	Emerson Freitas 66' (pen.)	Stadium: 19 de Outubro; Attendance: 1,287; Referee: Jodis Nascimento de Souza (Rio de Janeiro)

26 February 2026 G31	Ceará	2–1	Primavera-SP	Fortaleza
20:00	Lucas Lima 11'; Wendel 88'	Report	Gabriel Poveda 90+8'	Stadium: Castelão; Attendance: 8,789; Referee: Lucas Paulo Torezin (Paraná)

24 February 2026 G32	Joinville	1–0	CSA	Joinville
19:00	Vitão 75'	Report		Stadium: Arena Joinville; Attendance: 3,490; Referee: Arthur Gomes Rabelo (Espírito Santo)

25 February 2026 G33	São Bernardo	2–0	Atlético de Alagoinhas	São Bernardo do Campo
20:00	Lino 45+3'; Pablo Dyego 46'	Report		Stadium: 1º de Maio; Attendance: 446; Referee: Daniel Alejandro Hidalgo Blanco (Roraima)

25 February 2026 G34	ASA	1–2	Operário-MS	Arapiraca
20:00	Alex Bruno 11' (pen.)	Report	Arthur Manoel 5'; Robinho 63' (pen.)	Stadium: Coaracy Fonseca; Attendance: 3,659; Referee: José Mendonça da Silva Júnior (Paraná)

4 March 2026 G35	Velo Clube	0–0 (2–4 p)	Vila Nova	Rio Claro
19:00		Report		Stadium: Benitão; Attendance: 3,082; Referee: Lucas Casagrande (Paraná)

25 February 2026 G36	Tombense	1–1 (4–2 p)	Oratório	Tombos
19:00	Breno 39'	Report	Marcão 80'	Stadium: Almeidão; Attendance: 560; Referee: Fábio Augusto Santos Sá Júnior (Sergipe)

25 February 2026 G37	Caxias	0–1	Guarany de Bagé	Caxias do Sul
20:00		Report	Welder 65'	Stadium: Centenário; Attendance: 1,301; Referee: Fernando Antônio Mendes de Salles Nascimento Filho (Pará)

26 February 2026 G38	CEOV	1–1 (1–3 p)	Porto Velho	Cuiabá
21:00	Roque 45+1'	Report	Luan Viana 90+1'	Stadium: Dutrinha; Attendance: 378; Referee: Pierry Dias dos Santos (Rio de Janeiro)

25 February 2026 G39	Atlético Goianiense	1–0	Primavera-MT	Goiânia
16:00	Guilherme 16'	Report		Stadium: Antônio Accioly; Attendance: 1,654; Referee: Emerson Ricardo de Almeida Andrade (Bahia)

25 February 2026 G40	Retrô	1–2	Uberlândia	São Lourenço da Mata
19:00	Willian Lira 85'	Report	Marcos Calazans 38'; Thomas Ben-Hur 69'	Stadium: Arena Pernambuco; Attendance: 920; Referee: Gustavo Ervino Bauermann (Santa Catarina)

24 February 2026 G41	Boavista	2–3	Maringá	Saquarema
16:30	Lucas Silva 47'; Isael 62' (pen.)	Report	Edison Negueba 26'; Caíque 45+1'; Ronald Camarão 75'	Stadium: Elcyr Resende; Attendance: 194; Referee: Luciano da Silva Miranda Filho (Ceará)

5 March 2026 G42	Trem	0–0 (3–4 p)	Fluminense-PI	Santana
16:00		Report		Stadium: Augusto Antunes; Attendance: 100; Referee: Leonardo Willers Lorenzatto (Mato Grosso)

25 February 2026 G43	Gama	2–2 (4–5 p)	Goiás	Gama
20:00	Ramon 45+2'; David Coelho 77'	Report	Anselmo Ramon 29'; Cadu 87'	Stadium: Bezerrão; Attendance: 11,500; Referee: Lucas Guimarães Rechatiko Horn (Rio Grande do Sul)

25 February 2026 G44	Madureira	1–0	ABC	Rio de Janeiro
18:00	Wallace 67'	Report		Stadium: Aniceto Moscoso; Attendance: 685; Referee: Paulo Henrique Schleich Vollkopf (Mato Grosso do Sul)

25 February 2026 G45	Águia de Marabá	2–0	Independência	Marabá
20:00	Paulo Henrique 41'; Gustavo Vintecinco 75'	Report		Stadium: Zinho Oliveira; Attendance: 1,419; Referee: Anderson Ribeiro Gonçalves (Goiás)

4 March 2026 G46	Tuna Luso	4–1	Tocantinópolis	Belém
19:00	Jayme 21', 47'; Luã 26'; Paulo Rangel 36'	Report	Pedrinho 66'	Stadium: Curuzu; Attendance: 329; Referee: Diego da Silva Castro (Piauí)

5 March 2026 G47	Juventude	5–0	Guaporé	Caxias do Sul
21:30	Marcos Paulo 35', 45+3'; Gabriel Taliari 45+1', 90'; Lucas Mineiro 86'	Report		Stadium: Alfredo Jaconi; Attendance: 3,068; Referee: André Luiz Skettino Policarpo Bento (Minas Gerais)

25 February 2026 G48	Londrina	1–0	Penedense	Londrina
19:00	Bruno Santos 44' (pen.)	Report		Stadium: Do Café; Attendance: 3,434; Referee: Daiane Muniz (São Paulo)

4 March 2026 G49	Capital-TO	1–1 (4–5 p)	Manaus	Palmas
19:30	Rhaillam 40'	Report	Anderson 16'	Stadium: Nilton Santos; Attendance: 694; Referee: Angleison Marcos Vieira Monteiro (Rondônia)

25 February 2026 G50	Juazeirense	1–1 (1–3 p)	Capital-DF	Juazeiro
15:30	Alison 90+6'	Report	Eduardo 81'	Stadium: Adauto Moraes; Attendance: 334; Referee: Fabiano Monteiro dos Santos (São Paulo)

4 March 2026 G51	Betim	0–2	Operário Ferroviário	Betim
19:30		Report	Gabriel Boschilia 37'; Berto 64'	Stadium: Arena URBSAN; Attendance: 2,339; Referee: Bruno Pereira Vasconcelos (Bahia)

25 February 2026 G52	Imperatriz	0–3	Amazonas	Imperatriz
19:30		Report	Erick Varão 43', 53'; Adrien 90+2'	Stadium: Frei Epifânio; Attendance: 1,197; Referee: Marcos Mateus de Sousa (Tocantins)

3 March 2026 G53	Figueirense	1–0	Azuriz	Florianópolis
21:30	Igor Bolt 10'	Report		Stadium: Orlando Scarpelli; Attendance: 5,111; Referee: Márcio dos Santos Oliveira (Alagoas)

5 March 2026 G54	Santa Cruz	0–0 (2–4 p)	Sousa	São Lourenço da Mata
21:30		Report		Stadium: Arena Pernambuco; Attendance: 9,632; Referee: Paulo José Souza Mourão (Maranhão)

3 March 2026 G55	CRB	6–0	Porto-BA	Maceió
20:00	Mikael 19'; Bressan 24'; Breno Cezar 45+4' (o.g.); Luiz Phellype 75', 90'; Douglas Baggio 85'	Report		Stadium: Rei Pelé; Attendance: 7,238; Referee: Lucas Guimarães Rechatiko Horn (Rio Grande do Sul)

4 March 2026 G56	Avaí	3–0	Porto Vitória	Florianópolis
19:30	Thayllon 25', 28'; Rafael Bilú 82'	Report		Stadium: Ressacada; Attendance: 5,091; Referee: Maguielson Lima Barbosa (Federal District)

26 February 2026 G57	Portuguesa	5–1	Altos	São Paulo
21:30	Igor Torres 64', 82'; Renê 68', 90+2'; Everton Maceió 71'	Report	Betinho 58'	Stadium: Canindé; Attendance: 1,532; Referee: Roger Goulart (Rio Grande do Sul)

5 March 2026 G58	Portuguesa-RJ	1–0	Maracanã	Rio de Janeiro
19:00	Lohan 90+1'	Report		Stadium: Luso Brasileiro; Attendance: 1,595; Referee: Ivan da Silva Guimarães Júnior (Amazonas)

=== Third round ===
==== Matches ====
12 March 2026 G59	Barra	0–0 (4–3 p)	América Mineiro	Itajaí
21:30		Report		Stadium: Arena Barra FC; Attendance: 2,601; Referee: Edina Alves Batista (São Paulo)

11 March 2026 G60	Volta Redonda	0–0 (5–3 p)	América de Natal	Volta Redonda
19:30		Report		Stadium: Raulino de Oliveira; Attendance: 1,264; Referee: Roger Goulart (Rio Grande do Sul)

12 March 2026 G61	Sport	1–1 (5–3 p)	Anápolis	Recife
21:30	Marcelo 41'	Report	Borim 14'	Stadium: Ilha do Retiro; Attendance: 12,982; Referee: Bruno Mota Correia (Rio de Janeiro)

11 March 2026 G62	Athletic	2–0	Ypiranga	São João del-Rei
19:30	David Braga 66'; Ronaldo Tavares 83'	Report		Stadium: Arena Sicredi; Attendance: 2,087; Referee: Lucas Canetto Bellote (São Paulo)

11 March 2026 G63	Manauara	0–1	Fortaleza	Manaus
19:30		Report	Maílton 90+6' (pen.)	Stadium: Arena da Amazônia; Attendance: 2,686; Referee: Gustavo Ervino Bauermann (Santa Catarina)

11 March 2026 G64	Castanhal	0–4	Nova Iguaçu	Castanhal
20:00		Report	Jorge 19'; Léo Rafael 28'; Vini 34'; Iago 45+4'	Stadium: Modelão; Attendance: 1,718; Referee: Tarcísio Flores da Silva (Rio Grande do Norte)

11 March 2026 G65	Santa Catarina	0–1	Jacuipense	Rio do Sul
20:00		Report	Pedro Henrique 69'	Stadium: Alfredão; Attendance: 3,112; Referee: André Luiz Skettino Policarpo Bento (Minas Gerais)

12 March 2026 G66	Mixto	0–3	Novorizontino	Cuiabá
20:30		Report	Robson 18'; Dantas 74'; Carlão 90+5'	Stadium: Dutrinha; Attendance: 2,061; Referee: Jefferson Ferreira de Moraes (Goiás)

12 March 2026 G67	Maranhão	0–1	Ceará	São Luís
19:30		Report	Zanocelo 27' (pen.)	Stadium: Castelão; Attendance: 1,178; Referee: Fábio Augusto Santos Sá Júnior (Sergipe)

10 March 2026 G68	Joinville	0–1	São Bernardo	Joinville
19:30		Report	Pablo Dyego 73'	Stadium: Arena Joinville; Attendance: 3,149; Referee: Fernando Antônio Mendes de Salles Nascimento Filho (Pará)

12 March 2026 G69	Vila Nova	1–1 (5–4 p)	Operário-MS	Goiânia
19:00	Dellatorre 59'	Report	Roger 65'	Stadium: Onésio Brasileiro Alvarenga; Attendance: 4,263; Referee: Yuri Elino Ferreira da Cruz (Rio de Janeiro)

11 March 2026 G70	Confiança	2–0	Tombense	Aracaju
20:00	Andrey Quintino 11'; Wendel 88'	Report		Stadium: Batistão; Attendance: 4,382; Referee: Marcos Mateus de Sousa (Tocantins)

10 March 2026 G71	Ponte Preta	1–0	Guarany de Bagé	Campinas
21:30	Bryan 47'	Report		Stadium: Moisés Lucarelli; Attendance: 4,302; Referee: Lucas Paulo Torezin (Paraná)

11 March 2026 G72	Porto Velho	0–1	Atlético Goianiense	Porto Velho
20:30		Report	Marrony 21'	Stadium: Aluizio Ferreira; Attendance: 4,000; Referee: Bráulio da Silva Machado (Santa Catarina)

11 March 2026 G73	Maringá	3–2	Uberlândia	Maringá
19:30	Caíque 7'; Edison Negueba 63' (pen.); Giovane Gomes 90+1'	Report	Tomas Bastos 44'; Marcos Calazans 58'	Stadium: Willie Davids; Attendance: 3,758; Referee: Afro Rocha de Carvalho Filho (Paraíba)

11 March 2026 G74	Goiás	3–0	Fluminense-PI	Goiânia
19:30	Tadeu 23' (pen.); Cadu 79'; Lucas Lima 90+2'	Report		Stadium: Serrinha; Attendance: 5,048; Referee: João Vitor Gobi (São Paulo)

12 March 2026 G75	Madureira	0–1	Águia de Marabá	Rio de Janeiro
18:00		Report	Felipe Pará 45+10'	Stadium: Aniceto Moscoso; Attendance: 594; Referee: Márcio dos Santos Oliveira (Alagoas)

12 March 2026 G76	Tuna Luso	1–1 (1–4 p)	Juventude	Belém
21:30	Paulo Rangel 8'	Report	Gabriel Taliari 45+4'	Stadium: Curuzu; Attendance: 318; Referee: Daiane Muniz (São Paulo)

11 March 2026 G77	Manaus	0–0 (4–5 p)	Londrina	Manaus
21:30		Report		Stadium: Carlos Zamith; Attendance: 863; Referee: Alex Gomes Stefano (Rio de Janeiro)

12 March 2026 G78	Operário Ferroviário	2–0	Capital	Ponta Grossa
19:30	Pablo 45+3'; Vinícius Diniz 85'	Report		Stadium: Germano Krüger; Attendance: 3,939; Referee: Thaillan Azevedo Gomes (Amapá)

12 March 2026 G79	Amazonas	0–1	Figueirense	Manaus
20:00		Report	Lucas Alves 83'	Stadium: Arena da Amazônia; Attendance: 3,424; Referee: Paulo José Souza Mourão (Maranhão)

12 March 2026 G80	Sousa	0–2	CRB	Sousa
19:30		Report	Mikael 90+3'; Guilherme Pato 90+10'	Stadium: Marizão; Attendance: 3,056; Referee: Wagner do Nascimento Magalhães (Rio de Janeiro)

10 March 2026 G81	Portuguesa	1–1 (4–1 p)	Avaí	São Paulo
19:00	Renê 20'	Report	Paulo Vitor 15'	Stadium: Canindé; Attendance: 1,804; Referee: Bruno Pereira Vasconcelos (Bahia)

11 March 2026 G82	Paysandu	3–1	Portuguesa-RJ	Belém
21:30	Caio Mello 37'; Kleiton Pego 54'; Marcinho 68'	Report	Elicley 90'	Stadium: Curuzu; Attendance: 8,154; Referee: Jonathan Benkenstein Pinheiro (Rio Grande do Sul)

=== Fourth round ===
==== Matches ====
19 March 2026 G83	Volta Redonda	0–0 (1–3 p)	Barra	Volta Redonda
20:00		Report		Stadium: Raulino de Oliveira; Attendance: 1,292; Referee: Sávio Pereira Sampaio (Federal District)

17 March 2026 G84	Sport	1–3	Athletic	Recife
21:30	Iury Castilho 60'	Report	Vera 3'; Ronaldo Tavares 67', 90+6'	Stadium: Ilha do Retiro; Attendance: 12,270; Referee: Lucas Casagrande (Paraná)

17 March 2026 G85	Nova Iguaçu	0–1	Fortaleza	Rio de Janeiro
19:00		Report	Vitinho 45+5'	Stadium: Luso Brasileiro; Attendance: 608; Referee: Maguielson Lima Barbosa (Federal District)

18 March 2026 G86	Jacuipense	0–0 (5–4 p)	Novorizontino	Salvador
21:30		Report		Stadium: Pituaçu; Attendance: 76; Referee: Lucas Guimarães Rechatiko Horn (Rio Grande do Sul)

17 March 2026 G87	São Bernardo	0–0 (2–3 p)	Ceará	São Bernardo do Campo
19:30		Report		Stadium: 1º de Maio; Attendance: 1,176; Referee: André Luiz Skettino Policarpo Bento (Minas Gerais)

18 March 2026 G88	Vila Nova	0–0 (3–5 p)	Confiança	Goiânia
19:00		Report		Stadium: Onésio Brasileiro Alvarenga; Attendance: 4,043; Referee: Kléber Ariel Gonçalves Silva (Paraná)

18 March 2026 G89	Atlético Goianiense	1–0	Ponte Preta	Goiânia
20:00	Ramírez 64'	Report		Stadium: Antônio Accioly; Attendance: 2,431; Referee: Marcelo de Lima Henrique (Ceará)

19 March 2026 G90	Maringá	0–1	Goiás	Maringá
19:30		Report	Anselmo Ramon 87'	Stadium: Willie Davids; Attendance: 6,622; Referee: Yuri Elino Ferreira da Cruz (Rio de Janeiro)

19 March 2026 G91	Juventude	3–0	Águia de Marabá	Caxias do Sul
19:30	Luis Mandaca 36'; Pablo Roberto 51', 87'	Report		Stadium: Alfredo Jaconi; Attendance: 4,913; Referee: Fabiano Monteiro dos Santos (São Paulo)

17 March 2026 G92	Londrina	0–1	Operário Ferroviário	Londrina
21:30		Report	Berto 15'	Stadium: Do Café; Attendance: 6,002; Referee: Wagner do Nascimento Magalhães (Rio de Janeiro)

18 March 2026 G93	CRB	1–0	Figueirense	Maceió
21:00	Douglas Baggio 64'	Report		Stadium: Rei Pelé; Attendance: 10,516; Referee: João Vitor Gobi (São Paulo)

17 March 2026 G94	Portuguesa	2–3	Paysandu	São Paulo
21:30	Igor Torres 22'; Renê 37'	Report	Pedro Henrique 56'; Ítalo 90+2'; Castro 90+6'	Stadium: Canindé; Attendance: 4,111; Referee: Jefferson Ferreira de Moraes (Goiás)

== Two-legged rounds ==
=== Fifth round ===
==== Draw ====
The draw for the fifth round was held on 23 March 2026 at the CBF headquarters in Rio de Janeiro. The 32 qualified teams were divided into two pots based on their CBF ranking.

Pot A	Pot B
(Rio de Janeiro (state)) Flamengo (1); (São Paulo (state)) Corinthians (2); (São Paulo (state)) Palmeiras (3); (Minas Gerais) Atlético Mineiro (4); (São Paulo (state)) São Paulo (5); (Rio de Janeiro (state)) Fluminense (6); (Rio de Janeiro (state)) Botafogo (7); (Paraná (state)) Athletico Paranaense (8); Bahia (9); (Rio de Janeiro (state)) Vasco da Gama (10); (Minas Gerais) Cruzeiro (11); (Rio Grande do Sul) Grêmio (12); (Ceará) Fortaleza (13); (Rio Grande do Sul) Internacional (14); (São Paulo (state)) Red Bull Bragantino (15); (São Paulo (state)) Santos (16)	(Rio Grande do Sul) Juventude (17); (Goiás) Atlético Goianiense (18); (Bahia) Vitória (20); Ceará (21); Goiás (23); (Paraná (state)) Coritiba (24); (Alagoas) CRB (26); (São Paulo (state)) Mirassol (28); (Paraná (state)) Operário Ferroviário (30); (Santa Catarina (state)) Chapecoense (33); (Pará) Paysandu (35); (Pará) Remo (37); (Minas Gerais) Athletic (51); (Sergipe) Confiança (53); (Bahia) Jacuipense (94); (Santa Catarina (state)) Barra (99)

==== Summary ====
The first legs were played on 21–23 April and the second legs were played on 12–14 May 2026.

Team 1	Agg.	Team 2	1st leg	2nd leg
Atlético Mineiro	3–3 (4–2 p)	Ceará	2–1	1–2
Goiás	2–3	Cruzeiro	2–2	0–1
Athletico Paranaense	0–0 (4–1 p)	Atlético Goianiense	0–0	0–0
Flamengo	2–3	Vitória	2–1	0–2
Grêmio	5–0	Confiança	2–0	3–0
Paysandu	2–4	Vasco da Gama	0–2	2–2
Fortaleza	2–1	CRB	2–1	0–0
Bahia	2–5	Remo	1–3	1–2
Botafogo	1–2	Chapecoense	1–0	0–2
Red Bull Bragantino	2–3	Mirassol	1–1	1–2
Barra	0–2	Corinthians	0–1	0–1
Operário Ferroviário	1–2	Fluminense	0–0	1–2
Palmeiras	7–1	Jacuipense	3–0	4–1
Athletic	3–5	Internacional	1–2	2–3
Santos	2–0	Coritiba	0–0	2–0
São Paulo	2–3	Juventude	1–0	1–3

==== Matches ====
23 April 2026
19:00

Atlético Mineiro	2–1	Ceará
Cassierra 44'; Lodi 73'	Report	Wendel 65'

Arena MRV, Belo Horizonte
Attendance: 13,633
Referee: Bráulio da Silva Machado (Santa Catarina)
13 May 2026
21:30

Ceará	2–1	Atlético Mineiro
Alex Silva 8' (pen.); Everson 23' (o.g.)	Report	Kauã 90'
Penalties
Alano (penalty scored); Fernando (penalty missed); Éder (penalty scored); Rafael Ramos (penalty missed)	2–4	(penalty scored) Cassierra; (penalty missed) Alexsander; (penalty scored) Cuello; (penalty scored) Lyanco; (penalty scored) Everson

Arena Castelão, Fortaleza
Attendance: 8,130
Referee: Matheus Delgado Candançan (São Paulo)

3–3 on aggregate; Atlético Mineiro won 4–2 on penalties.

22 April 2026
19:00

Goiás	2–2	Cruzeiro
Nicolas 11'; García 90+6'	Report	Arroyo 18'; Jonathan 76'

Estádio da Serrinha, Goiânia
Attendance: 18,725
Referee: Davi de Oliveira Lacerda (Espírito Santo)
12 May 2026
21:30

Cruzeiro	1–0	Goiás
Kaio Jorge 32' (pen.)	Report

Mineirão, Belo Horizonte
Attendance: 26,337
Referee: Bruno Arleu de Araujo (Rio de Janeiro)

Cruzeiro won 3–2 on aggregate.

23 April 2026
21:30

Athletico Paranaense	0–0	Atlético Goianiense
	Report

Arena da Baixada, Curitiba
Attendance: 18,736
Referee: Paulo César Zanovelli da Silva (Minas Gerais)
14 May 2026
19:00

Atlético Goianiense	0–0	Athletico Paranaense
	Report
Penalties
Cristiano (penalty missed); Guilherme Lopes (penalty missed); Barreto (penalty scored)	1–4	(penalty scored) Viveros; (penalty scored) Mendoza; (penalty scored) Esquivel; (penalty scored) Jadson

Estádio Antônio Accioly, Goiânia
Attendance: 6,594
Referee: Alex Gomes Stefano (Rio de Janeiro)

0–0 on aggregate; Athletico Paranaense won 4–1 on penalties.

22 April 2026
21:30

Flamengo	2–1	Vitória
Evertton Araújo 10'; Pedro 52'	Report	Erick 11'

Maracanã, Rio de Janeiro
Attendance: 44,292
Referee: Anderson Daronco (Rio Grande do Sul)
14 May 2026
21:30

Vitória	2–0	Flamengo
Erick 7'; Luan Cândido 62'	Report

Barradão, Salvador
Attendance: 30,793
Referee: Raphael Claus (São Paulo)

Vitória won 3–2 on aggregate.

21 April 2026
19:30

Grêmio	2–0	Confiança
Carlos Vinícius 56'; Amuzu 71'	Report

Arena do Grêmio, Porto Alegre
Attendance: 18,350
Referee: João Vitor Gobi (São Paulo)
14 May 2026
19:00

Confiança	0–3	Grêmio
	Report	Braithwaite 14' (pen.), 58'; Willian 71' (pen.)

Batistão, Aracaju
Attendance: 5,040
Referee: Lucas Paulo Torezin (Paraná)

Grêmio won 5–0 on aggregate.

21 April 2026
21:30

Paysandu	0–2	Vasco da Gama
	Report	Spinelli 57', 62'

Mangueirão, Belém
Attendance: 25,933
Referee: Ramon Abatti (Santa Catarina)
13 May 2026
19:00

Vasco da Gama	2–2	Paysandu
Rojas 36' (pen.); Thiago Mendes 42'	Report	Thayllon 45+2'; Saldivia 46' (o.g.)

São Januário, Rio de Janeiro
Attendance: 16,653
Referee: Bráulio da Silva Machado (Santa Catarina)

Vasco da Gama won 4–2 on aggregate.

22 April 2026
20:30

Fortaleza	2–1	CRB
Maílton 44'; Miritello 56'	Report	Mikael 32'

Arena Castelão, Fortaleza
Attendance: 6,962
Referee: Edina Alves Batista (São Paulo)
14 May 2026
20:00

CRB	0–0	Fortaleza
	Report

Estádio Rei Pelé, Maceió
Attendance: 9,192
Referee: Anderson Daronco (Rio Grande do Sul)

Fortaleza won 2–1 on aggregate.

22 April 2026
19:00

Bahia	1–3	Remo
Willian José 23'	Report	Tchamba 17'; Yago Pikachu 75' (pen.); Alef Manga 90+5'

Arena Fonte Nova, Salvador
Attendance: 31,147
Referee: Alex Gomes Stefano (Rio de Janeiro)
13 May 2026
21:30

Remo	2–1	Bahia
Patrick 35'; Picco 90+1'	Report	Erick 22'

Mangueirão, Belém
Attendance: 22,461
Referee: Flávio Rodrigues de Souza (São Paulo)

Remo won 5–2 on aggregate.

21 April 2026
17:00

Botafogo	1–0	Chapecoense
Telles 90+1'	Report

Nilton Santos, Rio de Janeiro
Attendance: 26,001
Referee: Rodrigo José Pereira de Lima (Pernambuco)
14 May 2026
18:00

Chapecoense	2–0	Botafogo
Marcinho 20'; Bolasie 45+5'	Report

Arena Condá, Chapecó
Attendance: 9,897
Referee: Davi de Oliveira Lacerda (Espírito Santo)

Chapecoense won 2–1 on aggregate.

22 April 2026
21:30

Red Bull Bragantino	1–1	Mirassol
Lucas Barbosa 7'	Report	Lucas Barbosa 45+3' (o.g.)

Estádio Cícero de Souza Marques, Bragança Paulista
Attendance: 2,175
Referee: Wagner do Nascimento Magalhães (Rio de Janeiro)
13 May 2026
20:30

Mirassol	2–1	Red Bull Bragantino
Tiquinho 20'; Edson Carioca 68'	Report	Herrera 45'

Estádio José Maria de Campos Maia, Mirassol
Attendance: 3,883
Referee: Rafael Rodrigo Klein (Rio Grande do Sul)

Mirassol won 3–2 on aggregate.

21 April 2026
21:30

Barra	0–1	Corinthians
	Report	Lingard 45+2'

Estádio da Ressacada, Florianópolis
Attendance: 14,137
Referee: Rafael Rodrigo Klein (Rio Grande do Sul)
14 May 2026
19:30

Corinthians	1–0	Barra
Yuri Alberto 84'	Report

Neo Química Arena, São Paulo
Attendance: 32,371
Referee: Marcelo de Lima Henrique (Ceará)

Corinthians won 2–0 on aggregate.

23 April 2026
21:30

Operário Ferroviário	0–0	Fluminense
	Report

Germano Krüger, Ponta Grossa
Attendance: 9,244
Referee: Matheus Delgado Candançan (São Paulo)
12 May 2026
21:30

Fluminense	2–1	Operário Ferroviário
Savarino 10' (pen.); Acosta 37'	Report	Felipe Augusto 83'

Maracanã, Rio de Janeiro
Attendance: 11,703
Referee: João Vitor Gobi (São Paulo)

Fluminense won 2–1 on aggregate.

23 April 2026
19:30

Palmeiras	3–0	Jacuipense
Sosa 9' (pen.), 55' (pen.); Felipe Anderson 45+9'	Report

Allianz Parque, São Paulo
Attendance: 22,562
Referee: Marcelo de Lima Henrique (Ceará)
13 May 2026
21:30

Jacuipense	1–4	Palmeiras
Vicente 88'	Report	Maurício 23'; Felipe Anderson 24'; Erick Belé 36'; Luighi 53' (pen.)

Estádio do Café, Londrina
Attendance: 16,628
Referee: Jonathan Benkenstein Pinheiro (Rio Grande do Sul)

Palmeiras won 7–1 on aggregate.

22 April 2026
20:30

Athletic	1–2	Internacional
Kauan 16'	Report	Bruno Henrique 32'; Bernabei 63'

Orlando Scarpelli, Florianópolis
Attendance: 5,514
Referee: Flávio Rodrigues de Souza (São Paulo)
12 May 2026
19:30

Internacional	3–2	Athletic
Borré 21'; Allex 44'; Bernabei 69'	Report	Ian Luccas 38', 67'

Beira-Rio, Porto Alegre
Attendance: 8,860
Referee: Lucas Casagrande (Paraná)

Internacional won 5–3 on aggregate.

22 April 2026
19:30

Santos	0–0	Coritiba
	Report

Vila Belmiro, Santos
Attendance: 7,182
Referee: Bruno Arleu de Araujo (Rio de Janeiro)
13 May 2026
19:30

Coritiba	0–2	Santos
	Report	Bontempo 20'; Frías 28'

Estádio Couto Pereira, Curitiba
Attendance: 36,100
Referee: Ramon Abatti Abel (Santa Catarina)

Santos won 2–0 on aggregate.

21 April 2026
19:15

São Paulo	1–0	Juventude
Luciano 32'	Report

Morumbi, São Paulo
Attendance: 33,603
Referee: Lucas Paulo Torezin (Paraná)
13 May 2026
19:00
G83

Juventude	3–1	São Paulo
Gabriel Pinheiro 65'; Marcos Paulo 72'; Mandaca 90+4'	Report	Tapia 84'

Alfredo Jaconi, Caxias do Sul
Attendance: 6,007
Referee: Rodrigo José Pereira de Lima (Pernambuco)

Juventude won 3–2 on aggregate.

=== Round of 16 ===
==== Draw ====
The draw for the round of 16 was held on 26 May 2026 at the CBF headquarters in Rio de Janeiro. The 16 qualified teams (CBF ranking shown in parentheses) were placed in a single pot and drawn with no opponent restrictions.

Single pot
(São Paulo (state)) Corinthians (2); (São Paulo (state)) Palmeiras (3); (Minas Gerais) Atlético Mineiro (4); (Rio de Janeiro (state)) Fluminense (6); (Paraná (state)) Athletico Paranaense (8); (Rio de Janeiro (state)) Vasco da Gama (10); (Minas Gerais) Cruzeiro (11); (Rio Grande do Sul) Grêmio (12)	(Ceará) Fortaleza (13); (Rio Grande do Sul) Internacional (14); (São Paulo (state)) Santos (16); (Rio Grande do Sul) Juventude (17); (Bahia) Vitória (20); (São Paulo (state)) Mirassol (28); (Santa Catarina (state)) Chapecoense (33); (Pará) Remo (37)

==== Summary ====
The first legs were played on 1–3 August and the second legs on 4–6 August 2026.

Team 1	Agg.	Team 2	1st leg	2nd leg
Vasco da Gama	3–1	Fluminense	0–0	3–1
Internacional	3–2	Corinthians	2–0	1–2
Mirassol	1–2	Grêmio	1–1	0–1
Athletico Paranaense	2–4	Vitória	2–0	0–4
Atlético Mineiro	1–0	Juventude	0–0	1–0
Santos	1–0	Remo	0–0	1–0
Chapecoense	0–2	Cruzeiro	0–0	0–2
Palmeiras	5–3	Fortaleza	3–0	2–3

==== Matches ====
1 August 2026
17:30

Vasco da Gama	0–0	Fluminense
	Report

Maracanã, Rio de Janeiro
Attendance: 36,608
Referee: Ramon Abatti (Santa Catarina)
5 August 2026
21:30

Fluminense	1–3	Vasco da Gama
Martinelli 77'	Report	Brenner 34', 52'; Rodríguez 90+10'

Maracanã, Rio de Janeiro
Attendance: 48,794
Referee: Wilton Sampaio (Goiás)

Vasco da Gama won 3–1 on aggregate.

2 August 2026
19:30

Internacional	2–0	Corinthians
Matheus Bahia 61'; Alan Patrick 67' (pen.)	Report

Beira-Rio, Porto Alegre
Attendance: 33,559
Referee: Alex Gomes Stefano (Rio de Janeiro)
6 August 2026
20:00

Corinthians	2–1	Internacional
Gustavo Henrique 43'; Pedro Raul 70'	Report	Bernabei 59'

Neo Química Arena, São Paulo
Attendance: 44,777
Referee: Felipe Fernandes de Lima (Minas Gerais)

Internacional won 3–2 on aggregate.

2 August 2026
18:00

Mirassol	1–1	Grêmio
Bruno Santos 19'	Report	Amuzu 51'

Estádio José Maria de Campos Maia, Mirassol
Attendance: 5,592
Referee: Sávio Pereira Sampaio (Distrito Federal)
5 August 2026
19:30

Grêmio	1–0	Mirassol
Pavon 37'	Report

Arena do Grêmio, Porto Alegre
Attendance: 24,478
Referee: Davi de Oliveira Lacerda (Espírito Santo)

Grêmio won 2–1 on aggregate.

3 August 2026
21:00

Athletico Paranaense	2–0	Vitória
João Cruz 9'; Dudu 78'	Report

Arena da Baixada, Curitiba
Attendance: 23,824
Referee: Edina Alves Batista (São Paulo)
6 August 2026
20:00

Vitória	4–0	Athletico Paranaense
Renê 11', 60'; Erick 45+5'; Marinho 90+3'	Report

Barradão, Salvador
Attendance: 20,526
Referee: Bráulio da Silva Machado (Santa Catarina)

Vitória won 4–2 on aggregate.

1 August 2026
19:30

Atlético Mineiro	0–0	Juventude
	Report

Arena MRV, Belo Horizonte
Attendance: 37,041
Referee: Fernando Antônio Mendes de Salles Nascimento Filho (Pará)
4 August 2026
19:30

Juventude	0–1	Atlético Mineiro
	Report	Minda 90+4'

Alfredo Jaconi, Caxias do Sul
Attendance: 10,206
Referee: Flávio Rodrigues de Souza (São Paulo)

Atlético Mineiro won 1–0 on aggregate.

1 August 2026
21:00

Santos	0–0	Remo
	Report

Vila Belmiro, Santos
Attendance: 12,820
Referee: Bruno Arleu de Araujo (Rio de Janeiro)
4 August 2026
21:30

Remo	0–1	Santos
	Report	Rony 74'

Mangueirão, Belém
Attendance: 43,658
Referee: Anderson Daronco (Rio Grande do Sul)

Santos won 1–0 on aggregate.

2 August 2026
18:30

Chapecoense	0–0	Cruzeiro
	Report

Arena Condá, Chapecó
Attendance: 10,328
Referee: Raphael Claus (São Paulo)
5 August 2026
19:00

Cruzeiro	2–0	Chapecoense
Matheus Henrique 45+1'; Kaio Jorge 86' (pen.)	Report

Mineirão, Belo Horizonte
Attendance: 32,402
Referee: Matheus Delgado Candançan (São Paulo)

Cruzeiro won 2–0 on aggregate.

2 August 2026
16:00

Palmeiras	3–0	Fortaleza
Maurício 48'; Arias 64'; López 85'	Report

Nubank Parque, São Paulo
Attendance: 38,888
Referee: Rodrigo José Pereira de Lima (Pernambuco)
5 August 2026
21:30

Fortaleza	3–2	Palmeiras
Miritello 34'; Rodriguinho 44'; Lucas Emanoel 88'	Report	López 41'; Murilo 61'

Arena Pantanal, Cuiabá
Attendance: 15,186
Referee: Rafael Rodrigo Klein (Rio Grande do Sul)

Palmeiras won 5–3 on aggregate.

== Final rounds ==
The draw for the quarterfinals was held on 11 August 2026 at the CBF headquarters in Rio de Janeiro. The 8 qualified teams (CBF ranking shown in parentheses) were placed in a single pot and drawn with no opponent restrictions. The draw also determined the bracket sequence until the final.

=== Draw ===
Each CBF team's ranking is shown in parentheses.

Single pot
- (São Paulo (state)) Palmeiras (3)
- (Minas Gerais) Atlético Mineiro (4)
- (Rio de Janeiro (state)) Vasco da Gama (10)
- (Minas Gerais) Cruzeiro (11)
- (Rio Grande do Sul) Grêmio (12)
- (Rio Grande do Sul) Internacional (14)
- (São Paulo (state)) Santos (16)
- (Bahia) Vitória (20)

=== Bracket ===
Quarterfinals
(Rio Grande do Sul) Internacional	0	1	1
(Rio Grande do Sul) Grêmio	0	3	3
(Minas Gerais) Cruzeiro	1	1	2
(Minas Gerais) Atlético Mineiro	1	2	3
(São Paulo (state)) Palmeiras	3	0	3
(São Paulo (state)) Santos	0	0	0
(Rio de Janeiro (state)) Vasco da Gama	1	2	3
(Bahia) Vitória	0	0	0

Semifinals
(Rio Grande do Sul) Grêmio	2	1	3
(Minas Gerais) Atlético Mineiro	0	1	1
(São Paulo (state)) Palmeiras (p)	1	1	2 (5)
(Rio de Janeiro (state)) Vasco da Gama	0	2	2 (4)

Final
(Rio Grande do Sul) Grêmio
(São Paulo (state)) Palmeiras

=== Quarterfinals ===
The first legs were played on 25–27 August and the second legs on 1–3 September 2026.

Team 1	Agg.	Team 2	1st leg	2nd leg
Internacional	1–3	Grêmio	0–0	1–3
Cruzeiro	2–3	Atlético Mineiro	1–1	1–2
Vasco da Gama	3–0	Vitória	1–0	2–0
Palmeiras	3–0	Santos	3–0	0–0

==== Matches ====
27 August 2026
20:00

Internacional	0–0	Grêmio
	Report

Beira-Rio, Porto Alegre
Attendance: 44,709
Referee: Ramon Abatti (Santa Catarina)
3 September 2026
20:00

Grêmio	3–1	Internacional
Carlos Vinícius 14', 22'; Krovinović 68'	Report	Vitinho 79'

Arena do Grêmio, Porto Alegre
Attendance: 55,376
Referee: Bruno Arleu de Araujo (Rio de Janeiro)

Grêmio won 3–1 on aggregate.

25 August 2026
21:00

Cruzeiro	1–1	Atlético Mineiro
Arroyo 60'	Report	Renan Lodi 70'

Mineirão, Belo Horizonte
Attendance: 59,225
Referee: Flávio Rodrigues de Souza (São Paulo)
1 September 2026
21:00

Atlético Mineiro	2–1	Cruzeiro
Victor Hugo 77'; Fred 88'	Report	Kaio Jorge 29' (pen.)

Arena MRV, Belo Horizonte
Attendance: 42,992
Referee: Raphael Claus (São Paulo)

Atlético Mineiro won 3–2 on aggregate.

26 August 2026
21:30

Vasco da Gama	1–0	Vitória
Gómez 59'	Report

São Januário, Rio de Janeiro
Attendance: 19,194
Referee: Matheus Delgado Candançan (São Paulo)
2 September 2026
21:30

Vitória	0–2	Vasco da Gama
	Report	Gómez 80'; Rodríguez 90+5'

Barradão, Salvador
Attendance: 28,315
Referee: Rafael Rodrigo Klein (Rio Grande do Sul)

Vasco da Gama won 3–0 on aggregate.

26 August 2026
21:30

Palmeiras	3–0	Santos
López 34', 61'; Andreas Pereira 45'	Report

Nubank Parque, São Paulo
Attendance: 40,698
Referee: Bruno Arleu de Araujo (Rio de Janeiro)
2 September 2026
21:30

Santos	0–0	Palmeiras
	Report

Vila Belmiro, Santos
Attendance: 15,077
Referee: Davi de Oliveira Lacerda (Espírito Santo)

Palmeiras won 3–0 on aggregate.

=== Semifinals ===
The order of legs for the semifinals was decided in a draw held on 10 September 2026 at the CBF headquarters in Rio de Janeiro.

The first legs will be played on 1 November and the second legs on 7–8 November 2026.

Team 1	Agg.	Team 2	1st leg	2nd leg
Grêmio	3–1	Atlético Mineiro	2–0	1–1
Palmeiras	2–2 (5–4 p)	Vasco da Gama	1–0	1–2

1 November 2026
18:30

Grêmio	2–0	Atlético Mineiro
Carlos Vinícius 10'; Noriega 46'	Report

Arena do Grêmio, Porto Alegre
Attendance: 50,539
Referee: Davi de Oliveira Lacerda (Espírito Santo)
7 November 2026
18:00

Atlético Mineiro	1–1	Grêmio
Renan Lodi 25'	Report	Carlos Vinícius 38'

Arena MRV, Belo Horizonte
Attendance: 42,922
Referee: Ramon Abatti (Santa Catarina)

Grêmio won 3–1 on aggregate.

1 November 2026
16:00

Palmeiras	1–0	Vasco da Gama
Maurício 23'	Report

Nubank Parque, São Paulo
Attendance: 40,570
Referee: Anderson Daronco (Rio Grande do Sul)
8 November 2026
17:00

Vasco da Gama	2–1	Palmeiras
Colidio 15'; Rodríguez 76'	Report	Piquerez 55'
Penalties
Lescano (penalty missed); Thiago Mendes (penalty scored); Sosa (penalty scored); Colidio (penalty scored); Rodríguez (penalty scored); Gómez (penalty missed)	4–5	(penalty scored) Vitor Roque; (penalty scored) Gómez; (penalty scored) Sosa; (penalty scored) Andreas Pereira; (penalty missed) Giay; (penalty scored) Marlon Freitas

São Januário, Rio de Janeiro
Attendance: 21,275
Referee: Bráulio da Silva Machado (Santa Catarina)

2–2 on aggregate; Palmeiras won 5–4 on penalties.

=== Final ===
Copa do Brasil de 2026
6 December 2026
16:00
Final

Grêmio	v	Palmeiras

Estádio Nacional Mané Garrincha, Brasília
Referee: Bráulio Machado (Brasil)
