= 2023 Campeonato Mato-Grossense =

Brazilian state football league season

Campeonato Mato-Grossense de Futebol
- Season: 2023
- Champions: Cuiabá (12th title)
- Relegated: Cacerense; Sport Sinop
- Matches: 55
- Goals: 133 (2.42 per match)
- Top goalscorer: Daniel (9 goals)
- Biggest home win: Cuiabá 5–0 Luverdense (26 Feb); Cuiabá 5–0 Luverdense (1 Apr)
- Biggest away win: Sport Sinop 1–6 CEOV (4 Mar)
- Highest scoring: Sport Sinop 1–6 CEOV (4 Mar)
- Longest winning run: Cuiabá (9 matches)
- Longest unbeaten run: Cuiabá (13 matches)
- Longest winless run: Sport Sinop (9 matches)
- Longest losing run: Sport Sinop (7 matches)

The 2023 Campeonato Mato-Grossense de Futebol is the 81st edition of the Mato Grosso's top professional football league. The competition began on 21 January, and is scheduled to end on 8 April. Cuiabá are the defending champions.

Cacerense and Sport Sinop were relegated at the end of the first round, with Cacerense immediately returning to the second division after one year, and Sport Sinop, after two years. Cuiabá won their 12th title on 8 April 2023, after a 3–0 aggregate win over União; with 12 wins and one draw in 13 matches, the club won their title in an unbeaten status.

== Format ==
On the first stage, all ten teams play against each other in a round-robin format. The two worst teams are relegated, while the top two teams qualify straight to the semifinals, and the other four best-placed teams qualify to the quarterfinals.

In the quarterfinals, the 3rd place faces the 6th place, while the 4th place faces the 5th place in a two-legged fixture, with the best placed team playing at home in the last match. In the semifinals, the winner of the 3rd-6th place contest faces the 2nd place, while the winner of the 4th-5th place contest faces the 1st place, also on two-legged matches. The winners face each other in the Finals, also played on two legs.

=== Qualifications ===
The champion qualifies to the 2024 Copa do Brasil and 2024 Copa Verde. The best team who is not on Série D, Série B or Série C qualifies to the 2024 Série D.

== Participating teams ==
Club	Home city	Home stadium	Head coach	2022 result
Academia	Rondonópolis	Luthero Lopes	Edilson Júnior	6th
Cacerense	Cáceres	Geraldão	Marcos Menali	2nd (2nd division)
CEOV	Várzea Grande	Dito Souza	Ariel Mamede	8th
Cuiabá	Cuiabá	Arena Pantanal	Ivo Vieira	1st
Dom Bosco	Cuiabá	Dutrinha	Bernardo Gomes	4th
Luverdense	Lucas do Rio Verde	Passo das Emas	Betinho	3rd
Mixto	Cuiabá	Dutrinha	Éverton Goiano	1st (2nd division)
Nova Mutum	Nova Mutum	Valdir Doilho Wons	Mário Roberto	7th
Sport Sinop	Sinop	Gigante do Norte	Elton Medina	5th
União	Rondonópolis	Luthero Lopes	Odil Soares	2nd

== First round ==
=== Standings ===
Pos	Team	Pld	W	D	L	GF	GA	GD	Pts	Qualification or relegation
1	Cuiabá (Q)	9	9	0	0	26	4	+22	27	Advanced to the semifinals
2	União (Q)	9	5	3	1	12	8	+4	18	Advanced to the semifinals
3	CEOV (Q)	9	4	4	1	18	11	+7	16	Advanced to the quarterfinals
4	Dom Bosco (Q)	9	4	2	3	9	10	−1	14	Advanced to the quarterfinals
5	Luverdense (Q)	9	3	1	5	8	15	−7	10	Advanced to the quarterfinals
6	Academia (Q)	9	2	4	3	11	12	−1	10	Advanced to the quarterfinals
7	Nova Mutum	9	2	3	4	8	9	−1	9	
8	Mixto	9	2	3	4	9	13	−4	9	
9	Cacerense (R)	9	2	2	5	7	12	−5	8	Relegated
10	Sport Sinop (R)	9	0	2	7	7	21	−14	2	Relegated

(Q) Qualified for the phase indicated; (R) Relegated

=== Results ===
Home \ Away	ACA	CAC	OPE	CUI	DBO	LUV	MIX	NMU	SPS	UEC
Academia		4–1		0–3	0–1		1–1			
Cacerense			2–2	0–1		0–1		1–0		
CEOV	2–2				2–0			1–1		0–0
Cuiabá			4–1			5–0	4–1		3–0	2–1
Dom Bosco		2–1		0–1		2–1	1–1			1–1
Luverdense	2–1		0–2				1–1	0–1		2–3
Mixto		0–1	1–2					1–0	3–2	
Nova Mutum	0–0			1–3	3–0				1–1	
Sport Sinop	1–2	1–1	1–6		0–2	0–1				
União	1–1	1–0					1–0	2–1	2–1	

Legend: Blue = home team win; Yellow = draw; Red = away team win.

== Final stage ==
Quarterfinals
6	Academia	1	0 (3)	1
3	CEOV (p)	0	1 (4)	1
5	Luverdense	3	1	4
4	Dom Bosco	1	0	1

Semifinals
A	CEOV	1	0	1
2	União	1	1	2
B	Luverdense	0	0	0
1	Cuiabá	0	5	5

Finals
C	União	0	0	0
D	Cuiabá	2	1	3

=== Quarterfinals ===
The Federação Matogrossense de Futebol published the dates of the matches on 7 March 2023.

==== First leg ====
11 March
15h30
Group A

Academia	1–0	CEOV
Lucas Luzzi 56'	Report

Luthero Lopes, Rondonópolis
Attendance: 424
Referee: Rafael Odilio Ramos dos Santos

11 March
19h00
Group B

Luverdense	3–1	Dom Bosco
Cris Magno 15'; Yan 64'; Hudson 90+4'	Report	Odair Júnior 27'

Passo das Emas, Lucas do Rio Verde
Attendance: 965
Referee: Danillo Alves de Campos

==== Second leg ====
15 March
20h30
Group A

CEOV	1–0	Academia
Daniel 79'	Report	Ronald (red card) 30'
Penalties
Tiago Luís (penalty scored); Agenor (penalty scored); David Batista (penalty missed); Allef (penalty scored); Daniel (penalty scored)	4–3	Lucas Luzzi (penalty scored); Cadinho (penalty missed); Douglas (penalty scored); Mariano (penalty scored); Maranhão (penalty missed)

Dutrinha, Cuiabá
Attendance: 501
Referee: Leonardo Willers Lorenzatto

14 March
19h30
Group B

Dom Bosco	0–1	Luverdense
	Report	Mateus Oliveira 73'

Dutrinha, Cuiabá
Attendance: 382
Referee: Rafael Odilio Ramos dos Santos

=== Semifinals ===
==== First leg ====
19 March
16h00
Group C

CEOV	1–1	União
Luiz Henrique 10'	Report	Odail Júnior 8' (pen.)

Dutrinha, Cuiabá
Attendance: 990
Referee: Luiz Paulo de Moura Pinheiro

18 March
15h30
Group D

Luverdense	0–0	Cuiabá
	Report	Iury Castilho (yellow card) 73' (yellow-red card) 90'

Passo das Emas, Lucas do Rio Verde
Referee: Leonardo Willers Lorenzatto

==== Second leg ====
25 March
15h30
Group C

União	1–0	CEOV
Wallace 48'	Report	Gutemberg (red card)

Luthero Lopes, Rondonópolis
Referee: Leonardo Willers Lorenzatto

1 April
15h30
Group D

Cuiabá	5–0	Luverdense
Wellington Silva 33'; Mateusinho 37'; Ceppelini 45'; Matheus Alexandre 48'; Deyverson 81'	Report	Mateus Oliveira (red card)

Arena Pantanal, Cuiabá
Attendance: 1,449
Referee: Luiz Paulo de Moura Pinheiro

=== Finals ===
5 April
19h00
Group E

União	0–2	Cuiabá
	Report	Iury Castilho 53'; Jonathan Cafú 54'

Luthero Lopes, Rondonópolis
Referee: Luiz Paulo de Moura Pinheiro

8 April
15h30
Group E

Cuiabá	1–0	União
Mateusinho 28'	Report

Arena Pantanal, Cuiabá
Referee: Leonardo Willers Lorenzatto

== Top scorers ==
As of 16 March 2023

Rank	Player	Team	Goals
1	(Brazil) Daniel	CEOV	9
2	(Paraguay) Isidro Pitta	Cuiabá	6
3	(Brazil) Odail Júnior	União	5
4	(Brazil) Luan Viana	Mixto	4
4	(Brazil) Val Paraíba	Dom Bosco	4
