= Rafael Puridade =

Brazilian footballer

Personal information
- Full name: Rafael Puridade dos Santos
- Date of birth: 15 December 1998 (age 27)
- Place of birth: Salvador, Brazil
- Height: 1.93 m (6 ft 4 in)
- Position: Goalkeeper

Team information
- Current team: São José-SP
- Number: 1

Youth career
- 2015–2019: Vitória

Senior career*
Years	Team	Apps	(Gls)
2020	Grêmio Prudente	1	(0)
2021	Angra dos Reis	0	(0)
2021	Sinop	0	(0)
2022	Sport Sinop	0	(0)
2022–2023	Cacerense	16	(0)
2023	Sorriso FC	6	(0)
2023–2025	Mixto	3	(0)
2025	Sorriso FC	6	(0)
2025	Prudentópolis	14	(0)
2026	Galícia	9	(0)
2026	Araucária	13	(0)
2026–	São José-SP	0	(0)
- * Club domestic league appearances and goals as of 21:10, 18 June 2026 (UTC)

Rafael Puridade dos Santos (born 15 December 1998) is a Brazilian footballer who plays as a goalkeeper for São José-SP.

== Career ==
Born in Salvador, Bahia, Puridade played for Vitória as a youth, before joining Grêmio Prudente on 10 March 2020. A backup option, he moved to Angra dos Reis for the 2021 season, but was again second-choice before signing for Sinop.

In January 2022, Puridade moved to neighbouring Sport Sinop, but ended the year at Cacerense. He was a part of the squad of Sorriso FC in April 2023, before being announced at Mixto on 17 July.

Again a backup at Mixto, Puridade returned to Sorriso FC in May 2025, before helping Prudentópolis to win the year's Campeonato Paranaense Terceira Divisão. On 6 December 2025, he agreed to a deal with Galícia for the upcoming season.

On 18 June 2026, after a short spell at Araucária, Puridade was announced at São José-SP for the Copa Paulista.

== Career statistics ==
As of 18 June 2026

Club	Season	League			State League		Cup		Continental		Other		Total	
Club	Season	Division	Apps	Goals	Apps	Goals	Apps	Goals	Apps	Goals	Apps	Goals	Apps	Goals
Grêmio Prudente	2020	Paulista 2ª Divisão	—		1	0	—		—		—		1	0
Angra dos Reis	2021	Carioca Série A2	—		0	0	—		—		—		0	0
Sinop	2021	Mato-Grossense	—		—		—		—		6 (Note: Appearance(s) in Copa FMF)	0	6	0
Sport Sinop	2022	Mato-Grossense	—		0	0	—		—		—		0	0
Cacerense	2022	Mato-Grossense 2ª Divisão	—		7	0	—		—		—		7	0
Cacerense	2023	Mato-Grossense	—		9	0	—		—		—		9	0
Cacerense	Total		—		16	0	—		—		—		16	0
Sorriso FC	2023	Mato-Grossense 2ª Divisão	—		6	0	—		—		—		6	0
Mixto	2023	Mato-Grossense	—		—		—		—		1	0	1	0
Mixto	2024	Série D	0	0	3	0	—		—		—		3	0
Mixto	2025	Série D	—		0	0	—		—		—		0	0
Mixto	Total		0	0	3	0	—		—		1	0	4	0
Sorriso FC	2025	Mato-Grossense 2ª Divisão	—		6	0	—		—		—		6	0
Prudentópolis	2025	Paranaense 3ª Divisão	—		14	0	—		—		—		14	0
Galícia	2026	Baiano	—		9	0	—		—		—		9	0
Araucária	2026	Paranaense 2ª Divisão	—		13	0	—		—		—		13	0
São José-SP	2026	Paulista A2	—		—		—		—		0	0	0	0
Career total			0	0	68	0	0	0	0	0	7	0	75	0
