= Campeonato Mato-Grossense Second Division =

Football league in Mato Grosso, Brazil

- Organising body: FMF
- Founded: 1987; 39 years ago
- Country: Brazil
- State: Mato Grosso
- Level on pyramid: 2
- Promotion to: Campeonato Mato-Grossense
- Current champions: Chapada (1st title) (2025)
- Most championships: Mixto; Operário Ltda. Sinop (2 titles each)
- Website: FMF Official website

The Campeonato Mato-Grossense Second Division is the second tier of the professional state football league in the Brazilian state of Mato Grosso. It is run by the Mato Grosso Football Federation (FMF).

== List of champions ==
Season	Champions	Runners-up
1960	Palmeiras (1)	
1987	Tubarão (1)	Grêmio Jaciara
1988	Sinop (1)	Internacional
1989	Vila Aurora (1)	União Garimpeira
1990	Juventude (1)	Presidente
1991	Alta Floresta (1)	Sorriso
1992–2007	Not held	
2008	Palmeiras (2)	Cáceres EC (1977)
2009	Mixto (1)	Cuiabá
2010	Nova Xavantina (1)	Rondonópolis
2011	CRAC (1)	Palmeiras
2012	Sinop (2)	Cacerense
2013	Sorriso (1)	Operário Várzea-Grandense
2014	Dom Bosco (1)	Poconé
2015	Operário Ltda. (1)	AA Araguaia
2016–2017	Not held	
2018	Operário Ltda. (2)	Juara
2019	Nova Mutum (1)	Poconé
2020	Ação (1)	Grêmio Sorriso
2021	Sport Sinop (1)	Academia
2022	Mixto (2)	Cacerense
2023	Primavera AC (1)	AA Araguaia
2024	Cáceres EC (2021) (1)	Sport Sinop
2025	Chapada	Operário Ltda.

Notes

- Cáceres EC (runners-up in 2008) and Cáceres EC Ltda. (winners in 2024) are different clubs.
- Chapada FC is the formerly Poconé EC and moved from Poconé to Chapada dos Guimarães in 2024.

=== Titles by team ===
Teams in bold stills active.

Rank	Club	Winners	Winning years
1	**Mixto**	2	2009, 2022
1	**Operário Ltda.**	2	2015, 2018
1	**Sinop**	2	1988, 2012
1	**Palmeiras**	2	1960, 2008
4	**Ação**	1	2020
4	Alta Floresta	1	1991
4	**Cáceres**	1	2024
4	**Chapada**	1	2025
4	**CRAC**	1	2011
4	**Dom Bosco**	1	2014
4	Juventude	1	1990
4	**Nova Mutum**	1	2019
4	Nova Xavantina	1	2010
4	**Primavera AC**	1	2023
4	**Sorriso**	1	2013
4	**Sport Sinop**	1	2021
4	Tubarão	1	1987
4	Vila Aurora	1	1989

=== By city ===
City	Championships	Clubs
Cuiabá	5	Mixto (2), Palmeiras (2), Dom Bosco (1)
Sinop	3	Sinop (2), Sport Sinop (1)
Primavera do Leste	2	Juventude (1), Primavera AC (1)
Várzea Grande	2	Operário Ltda. (2)
Alta Floresta	1	Alta Floresta (1)
Cáceres	1	Cáceres (1)
Campo Verde	1	CRAC (1)
Chapada dos Guimarães	1	Chapada (1)
Nova Mutum	1	Nova Mutum (1)
Nova Xavantina	1	Nova Xavantina (1)
Rio Branco	1	Tubarão (1)
Rondonópolis	1	Vila Aurora (1)
Santo Antônio de Leverger	1	Ação (1)
Sorriso	1	Sorriso (1)
