= Sandrinho (footballer, born 1981) =

Brazilian footballer

Personal information
- Full name: Sandro Victor Silva Santos
- Date of birth: 22 May 1981 (age 45)
- Place of birth: Maceió, Brazil
- Positions: Defender; midfielder

Senior career*
| Years | Team | Apps | (Gls) |
| 2006–2008 | Vila Aurora | | |
| 2008 | → Cacerense (loan) | | |
| 2009 | Moto Club | | |
| 2009 | Inter de Santa Maria | 10 | (0) |
| 2010 | Vila Aurora | 2 | (0) |
| 2011 | CRAC-MT | | |
| 2012 | Sinop | | |
| 2012 | Vila Aurora | | |
| 2013 | Cuiabá | | |
| 2013–2015 | Rondonópolis | | |
- * Club domestic league appearances and goals

Sandro Victor Silva Santos (born 22 May 1981), commonly known as Sandrinho, is a former Brazilian footballer.

== Career statistics ==
=== Club ===
| Club | Season | League | | | State League | | Cup | | Other | | Total | |
| Club | Season | Division | Apps | Goals | Apps | Goals | Apps | Goals | Apps | Goals | Apps | Goals |
|---|---|---|---|---|---|---|---|---|---|---|---|---|
| Inter de Santa Maria | 2009 | – | | | 10 (Note: Appearances in the Campeonato Gaúcho) | 0 | 0 | 0 | 0 | 0 | 10 | 0 |
| Vila Aurora | 2010 | Série D | 2 | 0 | 0 | 0 | 0 | 0 | 0 | 0 | 2 | 0 |
| Rondonópolis | 2014 | – | | | 0 | 0 | 1 (Note: Appearances in the Copa do Brasil) | 0 | 0 | 0 | 0 | 0 |
| Career total | | | 2 | 0 | 10 | 0 | 1 | 0 | 0 | 0 | 13 | 0 |
