= Estádio Asa Delta =

Multi-use stadium in Primavera do Leste, Brazil

Coordinates: 15°34′S 54°20′W

Estádio Asa Delta is a multi-use stadium located in Primavera do Leste, Mato Grosso state, Brazil. It is used mostly for football matches and hosts the home matches of Sociedade Esportiva e Recreativa Juventude. The stadium has a maximum capacity of 5,000 people.
