= Nova Xavantina Esporte Clube =

Nova Xavantina
- Full name: Nova Xavantina Esporte Clube
- Founded: March 20, 1978
- Ground: Estádio Virgílio Nascimento, Nova Xavantina, Mato Grosso state, Brazil
- Capacity: 2,000
Home colours	Away colours

Nova Xavantina Esporte Clube, commonly known as Nova Xavantina, is a Brazilian football club based in Nova Xavantina, Mato Grosso state.

== History ==
The club was founded on March 20, 1986. They won the Campeonato Mato-Grossense Second Level in 2010, but was not promoted to the 2011 Campeonato Mato-Grossense First Level due to financial problems and because their stadium failed in the safety inspections.

== Achievements ==
- Campeonato Mato-Grossense Second Level:
  - Winners (1): 2010

== Stadium ==
Nova Xavantina Esporte Clube play their home games at Estádio Virgílio Nascimento. The stadium has a maximum capacity of 2,000 people.
