= Lucas Alves =

Lucas Alves may refer to:

- Lucas Alves (footballer, born 1992), Brazilian football centre-back for Thep Xanh Nam Dinh
- Lucas Alves (footballer, born 2002), Brazilian football attacking midfielder for Chapecoense
