= Arnold Maël Kamdem =

Cameroonian footballer

Personal information
- Full name: Arnold Maël Kamdem
- Date of birth: 18 January 2000 (age 26)
- Place of birth: Yaoundé, Cameroon
- Height: 1.68 m (5 ft 6 in)
- Position: Defensive midfielder

Team information
- Current team: Sport Sinop

Youth career
- Renaissance Ngoumou
- 2020: Itapirense

Senior career*
Years	Team	Apps	(Gls)
- Renaissance Ngoumou
2020	Itapirense		
2020	Nação		
2021	Fernandópolis		
2022	Manauara		
2022	→ Penapolense (loan)		
2022	→ São Raimundo-AM (loan)		
2023	Rio Negro-AM		
2023	Porto Velho		
2024	São Raimundo-AM		
2024	Real-RR		
2025	Tocantinópolis		
2025	Penarol		
2025–	Sport Sinop	6	(1)

International career^{‡}
2019	Cameroon U20		
2025–	Cameroon	2	(0)
- * Club domestic league appearances and goals ‡ National team caps and goals as of 31 March 2026

Arnold Maël Kamdem (born 18 January 2000) is a Cameroonian professional footballer who plays as a defensive midfielder for Sport Sinop and the Cameroon national team.

== Club career ==
Born in Yaoundé, Maël Kamdem began his career playing in the second national division for Renaissance Ngoumou. He ended up being brought to Brazil in 2020 where he first played for Itapirense. He continued playing for clubs in state divisions afterward, playing for Nação, Fernandópolis, Manauara, São Raimundo-AM, Rio Negro-AM, Porto Velho, Real-RR, Tocantinópolis and Penarol. In December 2025, he signed with Sport Sinop .

== International career ==
Maël Kamdem played for the under-20 national team in the 2019 U-20 Africa Cup of Nations qualification. In 2025, he was called up by coach David Pagou to the 2025 Africa Cup of Nations squad.

== Career statistics ==
=== International ===
As of match played 31 March 2026

Appearances and goals by national team and year
National team	Year	Apps	Goals
Cameroon	2025	1	0
Cameroon	2026	1	0
Total		2	0

== Honours ==
Porto Velho

- Campeonato Rondoniense: 2023
