= Sandrinho =

Sandrinho may refer to:

- Sandrinho (footballer, born 1980), Brazilian footballer who plays as an attacking midfielder
- Sandrinho (footballer, born 1981), Brazilian footballer who played as a defender or midfielder
- Sandrinho (footballer, born 1992), Brazilian footballer who plays as a forward or winger
