= Tomi Montefiori =

Argentine footballer (born 2003)

Personal information
- Full name: Carlos Thomas Gómez Montefiori
- Date of birth: 6 February 2003 (age 23)
- Place of birth: Merlo, Buenos Aires, Argentina
- Height: 1.76 m (5 ft 9 in)
- Position: Forward

Team information
- Current team: Serra Branca

Youth career
- 2006: San Antonio
- 2007–2017: River Plate
- 2013: → Argentinos Juniors (loan)
- 2017–2018: Racing
- 2018–2019: All Boys
- 2019: Crewe Alexandra
- 2020: Monte Azul
- 2020–2021: Crewe Alexandra

Senior career*
Years	Team	Apps	(Gls)
2021–2022	Crewe Alexandra	0	(0)
2021–2022	→ Nantwich Town (loan)	27	(1)
2022	Grêmio	0	(0)
2022	Guarany de Bagé	0	(0)
2023–2024	Juventude	0	(0)
2024	Stafford Rangers	0	(0)
2025	Monsoon	10	(0)
2025	Ypiranga-RS	4	(0)
2026	Primavera	16	(0)
2026–	Serra Branca	1	(0)
- * Club domestic league appearances and goals as of 23:04, 17 July 2026 (UTC)

Carlos Thomas Gómez Montefiori (born 6 February 2003), commonly known as Tomi Montefiori, and in England as Tommy Montefiori, is an Argentine professional footballer who plays as a forward for Brazilian club Serra Branca.

== Early life ==
Born in Merlo in the Buenos Aires Province of Argentina, Montefiori would accompany his mother to her football matches at the Estadio Monumental, where she played for River Plate Women.

== Club career ==
=== Early career ===
Montefiori's first club was San Antonio in San Antonio de Padua, where he played at the age of three. While watching one of his mother's matches, he was approached by River Plate youth coach, Luis Pereyra, who invited him to train with the club's youth team. As he was not yet old enough to be registered, his career with the club began in futsal.

He went on to spend the next eight years with River Plate - bar a year-long loan spell with Argentinos Juniors at the age of nine - before trialling at Racing Club de Avellaneda at the age of twelve. Despite successfully joining the Racing academy at the age of fourteen, he only played a total of fifteen minutes in his first season, claiming that his coaches asked him to make more sacrifices in order to play, and left the club at the end of the year.

He was offered the chance to trial with Italian side AC Milan by his former futsal coach, Diego Guacci, and applied for Italian citizenship due to his Italian heritage. Having travelled to Italy, he successfully trialled with Milan, and spent two weeks training with the team before playing in a youth game against Torino, who invited him to sign a pre-contract with the club. However, due to issues with his citizenship - being unable to attain an Italian passport - the deal was cancelled, and he returned to Argentina, joining All Boys in 2018.

=== Move to England ===
Montefiori would again try his luck in Europe, this time moving to England, joining Crewe Alexandra in October 2019. However, after two months, including training with the first team, the club decided against signing him, as they would have to pay a compensation fee to do so, because Montefiori had moved to England before turning eighteen. Such was his ability, then-manager David Artell reportedly told Montefiori: "if you had the passport, tomorrow I would give you 20 minutes against Aston Villa".

Having trialled in Portugal, and after a short spell in Brazil with Monte Azul, Montefiori returned to England, initially struggling to find a club due to the COVID-19 pandemic. He was offered the chance to re-join Crewe Alexandra, but as there were still issues with his passport, he was loaned to Northern Premier League side Nantwich Town in March 2021, with then-manager Dave Cooke stating that Montefiori was "one of the most exciting young prospects [he has] come across in a very long time". His career with Nantwich Town started well; having impressed in pre-season, he scored on his first competitive appearance - a 3–2 win over Stalybridge Celtic. Despite a promising first season in English football, Montefiori once again faced issues with his residency, and left England at the conclusion of the 2021–22 season, despite interest from Championship side Preston North End.

=== Move to Brazil ===
In May 2022, having left England, Montefiori went on trial with Brazilian side Grêmio, before signing for the club's under-23 side the following month. However, after just two months with the club, his contract was terminated in August, with Grêmio reportedly worried they would have to pay training compensation. Immediately following his departure from Grêmio, he signed a deal with Guarany until December 2022, to help the team compete in the Copa FGF. Following one game for Guarany, a 5–1 Copa FGF win against Onze Horas, he signed a deal with Série B side Juventude in November 2022, joining the club for the 2023 season.

After a handful of appearances in the Copa FGF for Juventude's B team, Montefiori was the club's top scorer in the 2024 edition of the Copa São Paulo de Futebol Júnior. Despite this, he failed to feature any further for Juventude, and following his release from the club, he returned to England to join Stafford Rangers in August 2024. Despite receiving international clearance, he was unable to get a valid work permit from the Home Office, and left the club without making an appearance just a month after joining.

Having returned to Brazil, he joined Monsoon in early 2025. After ten appearances in the Campeonato Gaúcho, he joined Ypiranga-RS in March 2025. Ahead of the 2026 season, he joined Primavera.

== Career statistics ==
=== Club ===
As of 17 July 2026.

Appearances and goals by club, season and competition
Club	Season	League			State League		Cup (Note: Includes FA Cup and Copa do Brasil)		Other		Total	
Club	Season	Division	Apps	Goals	Apps	Goals	Apps	Goals	Apps	Goals	Apps	Goals
Crewe Alexandra	2021–22	EFL League One	0	0	–		0	0	0	0	0	0
Nantwich Town (loan)	2021–22	Northern Premier League	27	1	–		2	1	4 (Note: One appearance in FA Trophy qualification, two appearances in the FA Trophy and one appearance and one goal in the Cheshire Senior Cup)	1	33	3
Grêmio	2022	Série B	0	0	0	0	0	0	0	0	0	0
Guarany	2022	–			0	0	0	0	1 (Note: Appearances in the Copa FGF)	0	1	0
Juventude B	2023	–							7	0	7	0
Stafford Rangers	2024–25	Northern Premier League	0	0	–		0	0	0	0	0	0
Monsoon	2025	–			10 (Note: Appearances in the Campeonato Gaúcho)	0	0	0	0	0	10	0
Ypiranga-RS	2025	Série C	4	0	0	0	0	0	0	0	4	0
Primavera	2026	Série D	8	0	8 (Note: Appearances in the Campeonato Mato-Grossense)	0	2	2	5 (Note: Appearances in the Copa Centro-Oeste)	0	23	2
Serra Branca	2026	Série D	1	0	0	0	0	0	0	0	1	0
Career total			40	1	18	0	4	3	17	1	79	5
