= Allef (footballer, born 1993) =

Brazilian footballer (born 1993)

Personal information
- Full name: Allef Bessa Nunes
- Date of birth: 9 December 1993 (age 32)
- Place of birth: Alcinópolis, Brazil
- Height: 1.86 m (6 ft 1 in)
- Position: Defender

Team information
- Current team: CEOV Operário

Senior career*
Years	Team	Apps	(Gls)
2012–2013	Aparecidense	5	(0)
2014	Baraúnas	3	(0)
2015	Itumbiara	6	(0)
2016	Goianésia	13	(2)
2016–2018	Grêmio Anápolis	0	(0)
2016–2018	→ União da Madeira (loan)	42	(3)
2019–2020	Cova da Piedade	31	(2)
2020	Aparecidense	1	(0)
2020	Real Brasília	0	(0)
2021	Penapolense	9	(1)
2021	Goianésia	3	(0)
2021–2022	Morrinhos	11	(1)
2022	Bandeirante	2	(0)
2022–2023	Morrinhos	11	(1)
2023–	CEOV Operário	5	(1)
- * Club domestic league appearances and goals as of 00:35, 12 February 2024

Allef Bessa Nunes (born 9 December 1993), known as Allef, is a Brazilian footballer who plays as a defender for Brazilian club Aparecidense.

== Club career ==
Allef made his professional debut in the Segunda Liga for União da Madeira on 9 October 2016 in a game against Cova da Piedade.
