= Primavera Atlético Clube =

Primavera AC
- Full name: Primavera Atlético Clube
- Founded: 6 January 2022; 4 years ago
- Ground: Estádio Antônio Santo Renosto, Primavera do Leste, Mato Grosso state, Brazil
- Capacity: 4,000
- President: Bruno Manfio
- Head Coach: Gelson Conte
- League: Campeonato Brasileiro Série D Campeonato Mato-Grossense
- 2025: Mato-Grossense, 1st of 9 (champions)
- Website: primaveraclube.com
Home colours	Away colours

Primavera Atlético Clube, commonly known as Primavera AC, is a Brazilian football club based in Primavera do Leste, Mato Grosso.

== History ==
The club was founded on 6 January 2022, to fill the gap left by Juventude and Primavera EC. The club debuted in 2022 using mostly players born in Primavera do Leste, not having a good campaign. In 2023 it was the champion of the second level of state football, debuting in the main division in 2024, where it was placed 5th. In 2025, it was the state champion by beating Cuiabá EC on penalties.

== Stadium ==
Primavera AC play their home games at Estádio Municipal Antônio Santo Renosto , nicknamed Cerradão. The stadium has a maximum capacity of 4,000 people.

== Appearances ==
Following is the summary of Primavera AC appearances in Campeonato Matogrossense.

Season	Division	Final position
2022	2nd	9th
2023	2nd	1st
2024	1st	5th
2025	1st	1st

== Honours ==
- Campeonato Mato-Grossense
  - Winners (1): 2025
- Campeonato Mato-Grossense Second Division
  - Winners (1): 2023
