= São José Esporte Clube =

Brazilian football club

São José
- Full name: São José Esporte Clube
- Nickname: Águia do Vale (Eagle of the Valley)
- Founded: 13 August 1933; 93 years ago
- Ground: Martins Pereira
- Capacity: 12,234
- President: Adilson José da Silva
- Head coach: Wilson Júnior
- League: Campeonato Paulista Série A2
- 2025: Paulista Série A2, 7th of 16
Home colors	Away colors

São José Esporte Clube, more commonly referred to as São José or São José-SP, is a Brazilian football club based in São José dos Campos, São Paulo. The team compete in Campeonato Paulista Série A2, the second tier of the São Paulo state football league. Its home stadium is Estádio Martins Pereira, which has a maximum capacity of 12,234.

== History ==
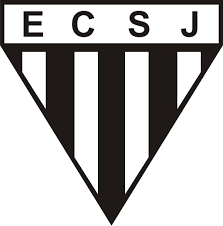
EC São José's first logo

The club was founded on 13 August 1933, as Esporte Clube São José, as their first president Galiano Alves had altercations with members of Associação Esportiva São José. The club's football spent their first decades only playing amateur tournaments, and saw Internacional Futebol Clube and Klaxon Clube merge into their structure.

São José played their first professional tournament in 1957, featuring in the Campeonato Paulista Terceira Divisão. In the following year, however, they returned to an amateur status, only officially becoming a professional club on 8 March 1964. In that year, they won the Terceira Divisão, and subsequently lifted another trophy in 1965 by winning the Campeonato Paulista Segunda Divisão, and achieved a first-ever promotion to the Campeonato Paulista.

Initially playing in the Estádio da Rua Antônio Saes, the club only featured in the Campeonato Paulista Primeira Divisão until 1967, subsequently going into inactivity for the construction of the Estádio Martins Pereira. Back to an active status in 1971 after the stadium was completed, the club won the Campeonato Paulista Primeira Divisão in the following year, but was unable to achieve promotion as any promotions were suspended by the Federação Paulista de Futebol.

On 24 December 1976, due to a financial crisis, Esporte Clube São José changed name to São José Esporte Clube to avoid pawning issues. They also changed its colors, which were black and white, to the current blue, yellow and white ones, and changed its logo. In 1977, under their new name, the club played in the second level, now named Campeonato Paulista Divisão Intermediária, and remained in that division until 1980, when they lifted the trophy and achieved a first-ever promotion to the Campeonato Paulista.

Due to their seventh place finish in the 1981 Campeonato Paulista, São José earned a spot in the 1982 Campeonato Brasileiro Série A, their first-ever national competition. They managed to reach the round of 16 in that competition, being knocked out by Bangu (finishing 12th). They remained in the top tier of the Paulistão until 1983, but went inactive for the 1984 season. Back to the second division in 1985, São José returned to the first division in 1987, after finishing second.

After a good campaign in the 1988 Paulistão, the club qualified to the 1989 Campeonato Brasileiro Série B. In that year, the club was runner-up of Campeonato Paulista by beating Corinthians in the semifinals and losing to São Paulo in the final, and runner-up of the Série B, losing to Bragantino in the final, but being promoted to the following year's Série A.

Unable to repeat the same success afterwards, São José suffered relegation from the Série A in 1990 (finishing 19th), and also suffered a drop in the Paulista in 1993. They also played in the Série B twice, in 1991 and 1992. In 1996, they won the Copa Vale do Paraíba after defeating Aparecida in the final, and also managed to return to the top tier of the Paulista.

Relegated again in 1999, São José established a women's team in 2001. In 2003, the club was renamed to Esporte São José, and suffered another drop to the Série A3 in 2004. In 2005, the club switched back to the name of São José Esporte Clube.

Back to the Série A2 in 2007, São José remained in that division until 2014, after suffering relegation. In 2016, another drop followed, to the Segunda Divisão. In December 2020, the club returned to the third tier of state league football after winning the Segundona. In April 2023, the club returned to the Série A2 after defeating Grêmio Prudente in the semifinals; they lost the title to Capivariano, however. In that year, the club was also runners-up of Copa Paulista, qualifying to the 2024 Série D as cup winners Portuguesa Santista chose to play in the Copa do Brasil.

On 17 October 2026, after three seasons qualifying to the Série A2 knockout stages but missing out promotion, São José won the Copa Paulista for the first time ever, after defeating União São João on penalties.

== Crest and colors ==
Home kit used until 1976.

Until December 1976, the club played in black and white vertical striped shirts, black shorts and white socks, similar to Corinthians' away kit. After the change of name, the club's main colors switched to blue, yellow and white. The original crest was an inverted triangle, similar in format to São Paulo's, but in black and white. After 1976, the logo switched to a round gear, similar to the seal in the flag of the city of São José dos Campos.

The current kits of São José are made by Diadora.

== Stadium ==
São José's home pitch is Estádio Martins Pereira, inaugurated in 1970, with a maximum capacity of 12,234 people. On 22 March 1970, São José Esporte Clube played its first match in their new stadium, losing to Nacional-SP 1-0.

== Mascot ==
Before 1976, São José was nicknamed Formigão do Vale (Big Ant of the Valley) due to high amount of Atta ants flying through the city, and the club adopted the ant as their official mascot. After the name change in 1976, the club was nicknamed Azulão do Vale (Big Blue of the Valley) until 1978, when the Águia (Eagle) became the official mascot of São José, thus also changing the nickname to Águia do Vale.

== Rivalry ==
The biggest rival of São José is Taubaté. The derby between the two clubs is known as O Clássico do Vale do Paraíba (The Paraíba Valley Classic).

Other rivalries also included Jacareí, and prior to that, the defunct Associação Esportiva São José.

== Players ==
Brazilian teams are limited to five players without Brazilian citizenship per match. The squad list includes only the principal nationality of each player; some players on the squad may have dual citizenship with another country.

=== Current squad ===
As of 17 November 2026

Note: Flags indicate national team as defined under FIFA eligibility rules; some limited exceptions apply. Players may hold more than one non-FIFA nationality.

No.	Pos.	Nation	Player
1	GK	BRA	Rafael Puridade
2	DF	BRA	Igor Dutra
3	DF	BRA	Wesley Rodrigues
4	DF	BRA	João Ramos
7	MF	BRA	Thomaz Carvalho
9	FW	BRA	Neto Oliveira (on loan from Falcon)
11	FW	BRA	Jefinho
16	MF	BRA	Guilherme Martineli

No.	Pos.	Nation	Player
20	MF	BRA	Lucas André
21	MF	BRA	Ygor Cauê
22	GK	BRA	João Lucas
27	DF	BRA	Natan Masiero
28	DF	BRA	Carlos Henrique
31	FW	BRA	Esquerda
—	GK	BRA	Gabriel Affonso

=== Youth team ===
Note: Flags indicate national team as defined under FIFA eligibility rules; some limited exceptions apply. Players may hold more than one non-FIFA nationality.

No.	Pos.	Nation	Player

=== Out on loan ===
Note: Flags indicate national team as defined under FIFA eligibility rules; some limited exceptions apply. Players may hold more than one non-FIFA nationality.

No.	Pos.	Nation	Player

== Personnel ==
=== Current technical staff ===
Position	Staff
Head coach	(Brazil) Wilson Júnior
Assistant coach	(Brazil) Luiz Fernando Estrada
Fitness coach	(Brazil) Celso Silva
Goalkeeper coach	(Brazil) Nilson Pizzo

Last updated: 11 July 2026
Source: São José EC

=== Board and other staff ===
Office	Name
President	Adilson José da Silva
Vice president	Duarte Plaça
Vice president	Agostinho Plaça
Football coordinator	Raudinei Borges
Youth coordinator	Renato Santiago

Last updated: 29 October 2025
Source: Aqui Vale

== Honours ==
=== Official tournaments ===
State
Competitions	Titles	Seasons
Copa Paulista	1	2026
Campeonato Paulista Série A2	2	1972, 1980
Campeonato Paulista Série A3	1	1965
Campeonato Paulista Série A4	2	1964, 2020

=== Others tournaments ===
==== State ====
- Torneio Incentivo (1): 1981
- Copa Vale do Paraíba (1): 1996

=== Runners-up ===
- Campeonato Brasileiro Série B (1): 1989
- Campeonato Paulista (1): 1989
- Copa Paulista (1): 2023
- Campeonato Paulista Série A2 (1): 1987
- Campeonato Paulista Série A3 (2): 2006, 2023

== Notable players ==
- (Brazil) Danilo Fidélis
- (Brazil) Émerson Leão
- (Brazil) Fidélis
- (Brazil) Roque Junior
- (Brazil) Sérgio Valentim
- (Brazil) Tata
- (Brazil) Tião Marino

== Notable matches ==
1989 Campeonato Paulista finals

- 28 June – São José 0–1 São Paulo
- 2 July – São José 0–0 São Paulo

(Both games were at the Morumbi Stadium in São Paulo)

1989 Tour of Spain

- 17 August – São José 2–1 Torrevieja (Copa Acquapark)
- 19 August – São José 1–1 Palamós (2–4 on penalties)
- 21 August – São José 0–0 Córdoba (2–3 on penalties) (Trofeo Arcángel)
- 22 August – São José 0–0 Martos (1–3 on penalties)
- 24 August – São José 2–1 Reus Deportiu
- 25 August – São José 1–0 Atlético Palma (Trofeo Palma del Río)
- 27 August – São José 3–1 Mollerussa
- 28 August – São José 0–0 Estepona (4–1 on penalties) (Trofeo Villa de Estepona)
- 29 August – São José 2–1 Puertollano Industrial (Trofeo Ciudad de Puertollano)

== See also ==
- São José Esporte Clube (women)
- São José Basketball
