= Primavera do Leste Airport =

Primavera do Leste Airport Aeroporto de Primavera do Leste
- IATA: none; ICAO: SWPY; LID: MT0023

Summary
- Airport type: Public
- Serves: Primavera do Leste
- Time zone: BRT−1 (UTC−04:00)
- Elevation AMSL: 655 m (2,149 ft)
- Coordinates: 15°33′45″S 054°19′50″W

Map
- Location in Brazil

Runways
Direction	Length		Surface
Direction	m	ft	Surface
01/19	1,330	4,364	Asphalt
- Sources: ANAC, DECEA

Primavera do Leste Airport (ICAO: SWPY), is the airport serving Primavera do Leste, Brazil.

== Access ==
The airport is located 4 km (2 mi) from downtown Primavera do Leste.

== See also ==
- List of airports in Brazil
