= Estádio Municipal Gigante do Norte =

Multi-use stadium in Sinop, Brazil

Coordinates: 11°52′17″S 55°29′58″W

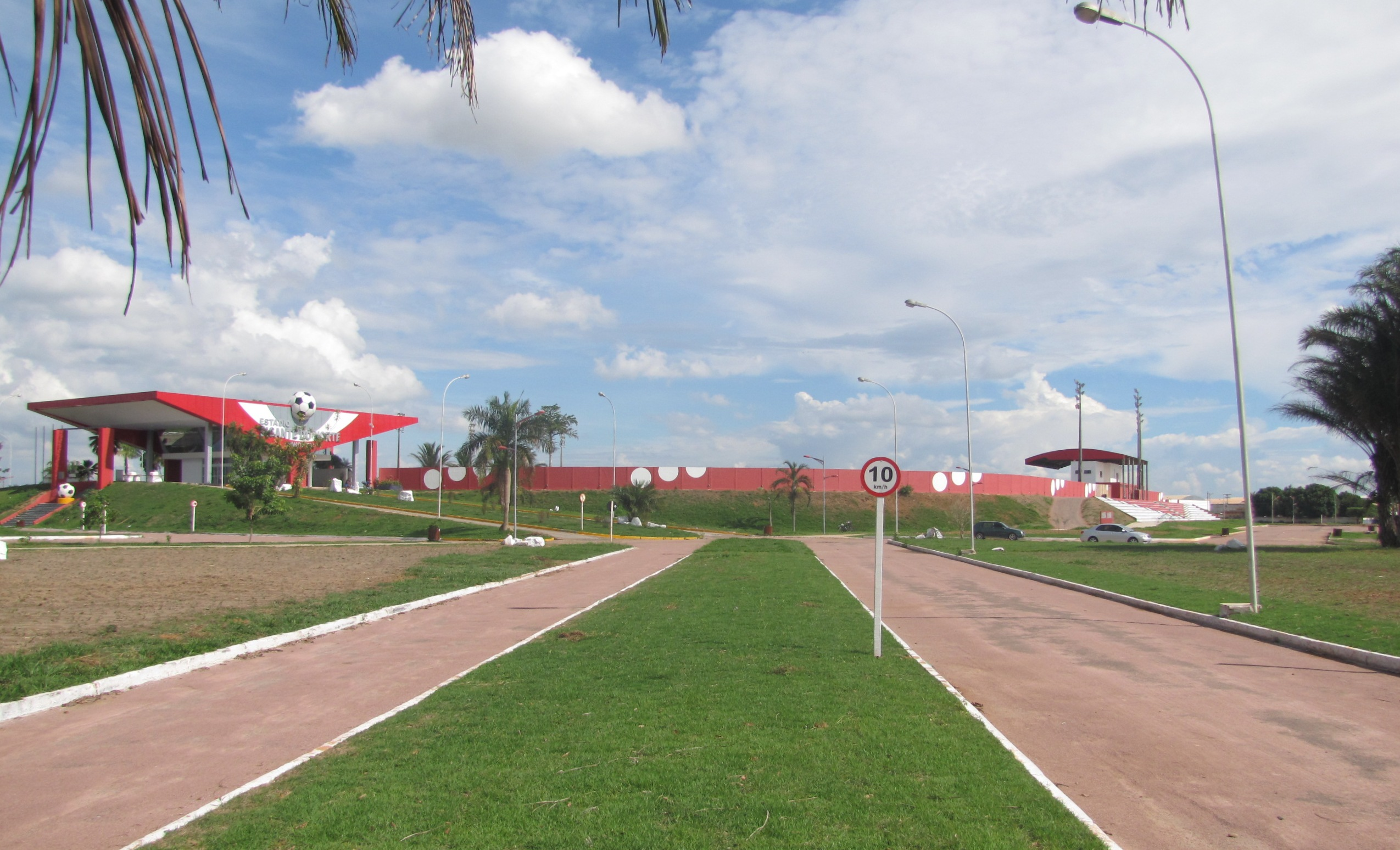
The Gigantão in 2010

Estadio Municipal Massami Uriu, also known as Gigante do Norte or Gigantão, is a multi-use stadium located in Sinop, Brazil. It is used mostly for football matches and hosts the home matches of Sinop Futebol Clube. Associação Atlética Sinop, a defunct club, also played its home matches at the stadium. The stadium has a maximum capacity of 25,000 people.
