= Copa FMF =

- Founded: 2004
- Region: Mato Grosso
- Teams: 6 (2022)
- Current champions: CEOV (1st title)
- Most championships: Luverdense (4 titles)

The Copa Federação Matogrossense de Futebol, also known as Copa FMF, is a tournament organized by Federação Matogrossense de Futebol every second half of the season.

The tournament was also previously called Copa Governador de Mato Grosso and Copa Mato Grosso before changing its name to the current one in 2017.

== List of champions ==
Season	Winner	Scores	Runner-up
2004	Luverdense	6–1; 1–1	Cuiabá
2005	Operário	Round-robin tournament	União Rondonópolis
2006	Cacerense	1–1; 2–1	Vila Aurora
2007	Luverdense	Round-robin tournament	Cacerense
2008	Araguaia	Round-robin tournament	União Rondonópolis
2009	Vila Aurora	1–1; 1–0	Cuiabá
2010	Cuiabá	3–1; 2–1	Operário
2011	Luverdense	2–2; 1–0	Operário
2012	Mixto	1–1; 1–0	União Rondonópolis
2013	Rondonópolis	1–1; 2–0	União Rondonópolis
2014	Not played
2015	Dom Bosco	2–0; 3–2	União Rondonópolis
2016	Cuiabá	2–1; 3–2	Mixto
2017	União Rondonópolis^{[a]}	1–1; 0–0 (2–0 p)	Cuiabá
2018	Mixto	2–1; 0–1 (3–2 p)	Dom Bosco
2019	Luverdense	0–1; 2–1 (4–3 p)	Cuiabá
2020	Cancelled due to the COVID-19 pandemic
2021	União Rondonópolis	2–0; 0–0	Dom Bosco
2022	Nova Mutum	Round-robin tournament	CEOV
2023	Mixto	Round-robin tournament	Cuiabá
2024	CEOV	1–0; 0–0	Nova Mutum

^{a} Originally Cuiabá won 2017 Copa FMF (1–1 and 2–0 against Dom Bosco). Two months after the ending of the Copa, Superior Tribunal de Justiça Desportiva (STJD) gave back 9 points deducted to União Rondonópolis in the first stage. So, União Rondonópolis finished fourth and qualified for the semi-finals. The previous semi-finals, Dom Bosco v Mixto, were annulled and União Rondonópolis played new semi-finals against Dom Bosco. União Rondonópolis won on penalties and advanced to the new finals against Cuiabá. In the finals, União Rondonópolis won on penalties.

=== Titles by team ===
- Luverdense 4 titles
- Mixto 3 titles
- Cuiabá and União Rondonópolis 2 titles
- Araguaia, Cacerense, Dom Bosco, Nova Mutum, Operário, Rondonópolis, Vila Aurora, and CEOV 1 title
