= Clube Atlético Matogrossense =

Atlético Matogrossense
- Full name: Clube Atlético Matogrossense
- Nickname: Atlético MT
- Founded: 21 April 1948
- Ground: Dutrinha, Cuiabá, Mato Grosso state, Brazil
- Capacity: 7,000
| Home colours | Away colours |

Clube Atlético Matogrossense, commonly known as Atlético Matogrossense, is a Brazilian football club based in Cuiabá, Mato Grosso state. They won the Campeonato Mato-Grossense five times.

== History ==
The club was founded in 1943. Atlético Matogrossense won the Campeonato Mato-Grossense in 1946, 1950, 1955, 1956, and in 1957. The club was disestablished in 1966. However, the team returned in late 80s and early 90s but became inactive once again. The team returned in 2020, once again.

== Honours ==
- Campeonato Mato-Grossense
  - Winners (4): 1955, 1956, 1957, 1960
  - Runners-up (1): 1958

== Stadium ==
Clube Atlético Matogrossense played their home games at Estádio Presidente Eurico Gaspar Dutra, nicknamed Dutrinha. The stadium has a maximum capacity of 7,000 people.
