= Grêmio Esportivo Jaciara =

Jaciara
- Full name: Grêmio Esportivo Jaciara
- Nicknames: Time de Gaúchos; Time de CTG
- Founded: 15 Juny, 1975
- Ground: Estádio Municipal Márcio Cassiano da Silva
- Capacity: 5,000
- League: Campeonato Mato-Grossense Second Division
- 2011: 7th of 9
Home colours	Away colours

Grêmio Esportivo Jaciara, usually known simply as Jaciara is a Brazilian football club from Jaciara, Mato Grosso state.

== History ==
On June 15, 1975, the club was founded.

In 2007, Jaciara finished as Mato Grosso State Championship's runner-up, thus being allowed to compete in the same year's Brazilian Championship Third Level.

== Stadium ==
Jaciara's stadium is Estádio Municipal Márcio Cassiano da Silva, with has a maximum capacity of 5,000 people.
