= Sociedade Esportiva e Recreativa Juventude =

Brazilian football club

Juventude
- Full name: Sociedade Esportiva e Recreativa Juventude
- Founded: May 23, 1982; 44 years ago
- Ground: Estádio Asa Delta, Primavera do Leste
- Capacity: 5,000
Home colors	Away colors

Sociedade Esportiva e Recreativa Juventude (also referred to as Juventude, Juventude MT or SER Juventude MT) is a Brazilian association football team from the town of Primavera do Leste in Mato Grosso state. It is a separate club from the bigger Brazilian team Esporte Clube Juventude.

== History ==
On May 23, 1982, Sociedade Esportiva e Recreativa Juventude was founded.

== Honours ==
- Campeonato Matogrossense
  - Winners (2): 2000, 2001
  - Runners-up (2): 1999, 2002
- Campeonato Mato-Grossense Second Division
  - Winners (1): 1990

== Stadium ==
Their home stadium is the Estádio Asa Delta, which has a capacity of 5,000.

== Club colors ==
The club colors are red and white.

== Trivia ==
- Juventude's logo represents a chimarrão gourd (or cuia de chimarrão, in Portuguese language).
