= Breno Cezar =

Brazilian footballer (born 1995)

Personal information
- Full name: Breno Cesar Valerio Gonzaga
- Date of birth: April 21, 1995 (age 31)
- Place of birth: Brazil
- Height: 1.84 m (6 ft 1/2 in)
- Position: Defender

Senior career*
Years	Team	Apps	(Gls)
2015	Betinense		
2015	Ipatinga		
2016	Formiga		
2017	Betinense		
2017	SC Sagamihara		
- * Club domestic league appearances and goals

Breno Cesar Valerio Gonzaga (born April 21, 1995), also known as Breno Cezar, is a Brazilian football player.
