= Clube Esportivo Dom Bosco =

Brazilian football team, 1925 onwards

Dom Bosco
- Full name: Clube Esportivo Dom Bosco
- Nickname: Leão da Colina
- Founded: January 4, 1925
- Ground: Verdão
- Capacity: 47,000
- Manager: Gianni Freitas
- League: Campeonato Mato-Grossense Segunda Divisão
- 2025: Mato-Grossense Segunda Divisão, 6th of 10
Home colours	Away colours	Third colours

Clube Esportivo Dom Bosco, commonly known as Dom Bosco, are a Brazilian football team from Cuiabá. They won the Campeonato Matogrossense six times and competed in the Série A three times. Dom Bosco are the oldest club from Mato Grosso state.

== History ==
They were founded on January 4, 1925, being the oldest club from Mato Grosso state. Dom Bosco won the Campeonato Matogrossense for the first time in 1958. The club competed in the Série A in 1977, 1978 and in 1979. They finished in the last place in 1977.

== Stadium ==
They play their home games at the Verdão stadium. The stadium has a maximum capacity of 47,000 people.

== Honours ==
=== Official tournaments ===
State
Competitions	Titles	Seasons
Campeonato Mato-Grossense	5	1958, 1963, 1966, 1971, 1991
Copa FMF	1	2015
Campeonato Mato-Grossense Second Division	1	2014

=== Runners-up ===
- Campeonato Mato-Grossense (14): 1943, 1947, 1948, 1950, 1952, 1954, 1955, 1960, 1965, 1974, 1979, 1989, 1990, 1994
- Copa FMF (2): 2018, 2021
