= Sorriso Esporte Clube =

Sorriso
- Full name: Sorriso Esporte Clube
- Nickname(s): Lobo do Norte; SEC
- Founded: July 20, 1985
- Ground: Estádio Egídio José Preima, Sorriso
- Capacity: 5,000
- President: Mauro Savi
- Head coach: Emerson Mateus
- League: Campeonato Matogrossense
- 2010: Campeonato Matogrossense
Home colours	Away colours

Sorriso Esporte Clube, commonly known as Sorriso, is a Brazilian football club based in Sorriso, Mato Grosso state. They competed in the Copa do Brasil twice.

== History ==
The club was founded on July 20, 1985. Sorriso Esporte Clube won the Campeonato Matogrossense in 1992 and in 1993. The club competed in the Copa do Brasil in 1993 and in 1994.

== Honours ==
- Campeonato Matogrossense
  - Winners (2): 1992, 1993

== Stadium ==
Sorriso Esporte Clube play their home games at Estádio Egídio José Preima. The stadium has a maximum capacity of 5,000 people.
