= Lucas Alves (footballer, born 2002) =

Brazilian footballer (born 2002)

Personal information
- Date of birth: 27 March 2002 (age 24)
- Place of birth: Foz do Iguaçu, Brazil
- Position: Attacking midfielder

Team information
- Current team: Chapecoense
- Number: 35

Youth career
- 2018–2021: Grêmio

Senior career*
Years	Team	Apps	(Gls)
2021	Grêmio	0	(0)
2021	→ São Luiz (loan)	2	(0)
2022–2023	Chapecoense	2	(0)
2024	Galo Maringá	2	(0)
2024	Concórdia	10	(1)
2024–2025	Bonsucesso		
2025–2026	Foz do Iguaçu	7	(5)
2026	Figueirense	12	(2)
2026–	Juventude	8	(2)
- * Club domestic league appearances and goals as of 17 November 2026

Lucas Alves (born 27 March 2002) is a Brazilian professional footballer who plays as an attacking midfielder for Campeonato Brasileiro Série B club Juventude.

== Club career ==
Born in Foz do Iguaçu, Brazil, Gazão Henrique joined the Grêmio's Academy at the age of 16 in 2018.

== Career statistics ==
=== Club ===
As of 30 May 2021

Appearances and goals by club, season and competition
Club	Season	League			National Cup		Continental		Other		Total	
Club	Season	Division	Apps	Goals	Apps	Goals	Apps	Goals	Apps	Goals	Apps	Goals
Grêmio	2021	Série A	—		—		—		—		0	0
São Luiz (loan)	2021	State	—		—		—		2 (Note: Appearance(s) in Campeonato Gaúcho.)	0	2	0
Career total			0	0	0	0	0	0	2	0	2	0
