= Clube Sport Sinop =

Brazilian football club

Sport Sinop
- Full name: Clube Sport Sinop
- Nickname: Fera do Norte
- Founded: 12 April 2021; 4 years ago
- Stadium: Gigante do Norte
- Capacity: 13,000
- Chairman: Valdecir Augusto Birtche
- Manager: Elton Mota
- League: Campeonato Mato-Grossense
- 2025: 8th of 9
Home colours	Away colours

Clube Sport Sinop is a Brazilian football club based in Sinop, Mato Grosso. The team colors are yellow, black and white. The club plays its games at the Gigante do Norte stadium with a capacity of 13,000.

== History ==
Sport Sinop was founded on 12 April 2021.

The same year, they entered the Campeonato Mato-Grosso Second Division which they won and were promoted to the Campeonato Mato-Grossense.

In their first season in the Campeonato Mato-Grossense, they finished in 5th place, which has been their highest finish ever. The next season, Sport Sinop finished bottom of the Campeonato Mato-Grossense, suffering relegation.

They secured promotion after finishing 2nd in the Mato-Grossense Second Division, only losing in the final to Cáceres.

== Honours ==
- Campeonato Mato-Grossense Second Division:
  - Winners: 2021
