= Mixto Esporte Clube =

Mixto
- Full name: Mixto Esporte Clube
- Nickname: Alvinegro
- Founded: 20 May 1934; 91 years ago
- Ground: Arena Pantanal; Cuiabá, Brazil
- Capacity: 41,390
- League: Campeonato Brasileiro Série D Campeonato Mato-Grossense
- 2025 2025: Série D, 16th of 64; Mato-Grossense, 3rd of 9
- Website: www.mixtonet.com
Home colors	Away colors

Mixto Esporte Clube, usually known simply as Mixto, is a Brazilian football club from Cuiabá, Mato Grosso state. The club competed in the Campeonato Brasileiro Série A several times and is one of the most popular clubs of Mato Grosso state. Mixto is also the most successful football club of Mato Grosso, having won twenty-five Campeonato Matogrossense titles.

== History ==
The club was founded on May 20, 1934, by a mixed group of men and women, hence the club's name, but instead of using the correct spelling Misto, the wrong spelling Mixto was used, to differentiate the club from the misto sandwich.

In 1943, Mixto won the Campeonato Matogrossense first edition. In 1976, the club competed in the Campeonato Brasileiro Série A for the first time, finishing in the 27th position. In 1982, the club finished sixth in the Serie B.

With their 1984 state title, the club gained promotion to the 1985 Serie A, where the club had its best campaign in history, finishing in 14th place, above other G-12 teams like Gremio, Corinthians, Fluminense, Santos, and Sao Paulo. However, a CBF league restructuring caused their "relegation" to Serie B in 1986 with the 1986 Parallel Tournament, where 36 teams were divided into group of 9, with only the four group winners remaining in the Serie A.

In 2008, the club won the state league for the first time since 1996 with a 1-0 victory on aggregate over União Rondonópolis.

In 2009, the club was relegated from Serie C.

== Honours ==
=== Official tournaments ===
State
Competitions	Titles	Seasons
Campeonato Mato-Grossense	25	1943, 1945, 1947, 1948, 1949, 1951, 1952, 1953, 1954, 1959, 1961, 1962, 1965, 1969, 1970, 1979, 1980, 1981, 1982, 1984, 1988, 1989, 1996, 2008, 2026
Copa FMF	3	2012, 2018, 2023
Campeonato Mato-Grossense Second Division	2^{s}	2009, 2022

- record
- ^{s} shared record

=== Others tournaments ===
==== Regional ====
- Torneio Centro-Oeste (1): 1976

==== State ====
- Torneio Início do Campeonato Mato-Grossense (1): 1969

=== Runners-up ===
- Campeonato Mato-Grossense (16): 1956, 1957, 1963, 1964, 1966, 1967, 1971, 1973, 1976, 1978, 1983, 1985, 1986, 1987, 1992, 2013
- Copa FMF (1): 2016

=== Women's Football ===
- Campeonato Brasileiro de Futebol Feminino Série A3 (1): 2023
- Campeonato Mato-Grossense de Futebol Feminino (9): 2007, 2009, 2010, 2011, 2015, 2020, 2021, 2022, 2023
