= União Esporte Clube =

Brazilian association football club based in Rondonópolis, Mato Grosso, Brazil

União Rondonópolis
- Full name: União Esporte Clube
- Nicknames: Colorado; Tourão do Cerrado (Big Bull from Cerrado)
- Founded: 6 March 1973; 53 years ago
- Ground: Estádio Engenheiro Luthero Lopes
- Capacity: 19,000
- President: Reydner Souza
- Head coach: Odil Soares
- League: Campeonato Brasileiro Série D Campeonato Mato-Grossense
- 2025: Mato-Grossense, 6th of 10
Home colors	Away colors

União Esporte Clube, commonly referred to as União Rondonópolis, is a Brazilian professional club based in Rondonópolis, Mato Grosso founded on 6 June 1973. It competes in the Campeonato Brasileiro Série D, the fourth tier of Brazilian football, as well as in the Campeonato Mato-Grossense, the top flight of the Mato Grosso state football league.

== History ==
União Esporte Clube were founded on 6 June 1973. They won the Torneio Incentivo in 1975, 1976 and in 1979. União were eliminated in the first stage in the Green module of the Copa João Havelange in 2000.

The club competed in the 2009 Copa do Brasil, when they gained national fame after beating Internacional 1–0 on 18 February, in the first leg of the first round of the cup. However, the club were eliminated in that round, after being defeated 2–0 in the second leg. Steps are ongoing to transition from a football club to a football corporation - Sociedade Anônima do Futebol (SAF). In remembrance of its former president, Arni Spiering, the club observed a 3 days mourning where all its football activities were suspended to honour him.

== Stadium ==
União Rondonópolis play their home games at Estádio Engenheiro Lutero Lopes. The stadium has a maximum capacity of 18,000 people.

== Honours ==
- Campeonato Mato-Grossense
  - Winners (1): 2010
- Copa FMF
  - Winners (2): 2017, 2021
