= Sinop Futebol Clube =

Brazilian association football club based in Sinop, Mato Grosso, Brazil

Sinop
- Full name: Sinop Futebol Clube
- Nickname: Galo do Norte (Northern Rooster)
- Founded: 16 January 1977; 48 years ago
- Ground: Estádio Municipal Gigante do Norte
- Capacity: 13,000
- President: Agnaldo Teicheira Turra
- Head coach: Marcos Birigui
- 2024: Mato-Grossense Segunda Divisão, 3rd of 11
- Website: http://www.sinopfutebolclube.com.br/
Home colors	Away colors

Sinop Futebol Clube is a Brazilian association football club based in the city of Sinop, in the state of Mato Grosso.

== History ==
On January 16, 1977, Sinop Futebol Clube was founded. The club was eliminated in the First Round by Santos in the Copa do Brasil in 1999 and in the Second Round by São Paulo in the Copa do Brasil in 2000. The club is famous for being the first professional club of Rogério Ceni.

== Honours ==
- Campeonato Mato-Grossense
  - Winners (3): 1990, 1998, 1999
  - Runners-up (5): 1996, 2000, 2016, 2017, 2018
- Campeonato Mato-Grossense Second Division
  - Winners (2): 1988, 2012

== Stadium ==
They currently play in their home stadium, the Estádio Municipal Gigante do Norte, which has a capacity of 25,000.

== Mascot ==
The club's mascot is a rooster.
