= Federação Matogrossense de Futebol =

Brazilian football state federation

- Formation: 26 May 1942; 84 years ago
- Type: List of international sport federations
- Headquarters: Cuiabá, Mato Grosso, Brazil
- Official language: Portuguese
- Website: fmfmt.com.br

The Federação Matogrossense de Futebol (English: Football Association of Mato Grosso state) was founded on May 26, 1942, and it manages all the official football tournaments within the state of Mato Grosso, which are the Campeonato Mato-Grossense, the Campeonato Mato-Grossense lower levels and the Copa Governador de Mato Grosso, and represents the clubs at the Brazilian Football Confederation (CBF).
