= Sociedade Esportiva Vila Aurora =

Vila Aurora
- Full name: Sociedade Esportiva Vila Aurora
- Nickname(s): Tigrão
- Founded: May 5, 1964
- Ground: Estádio Engenheiro Luthero Lopes, Rondonópolis
- Capacity: 18,000
- President: Júnior
- Head coach: Carlos Rufino
- League: Campeonato Brasileiro Série D
- 2011: Série D, 36th
Home colors	Away colors

Sociedade Esportiva Vila Aurora, commonly known as Vila Aurora, is a Brazilian football club based in Rondonópolis, Mato Grosso state. They competed three times in the Série D, and competed in the Copa do Brasil once.

== History ==
The club was founded on May 5, 1964. Vila Aurora won the Campeonato Mato-Grossense Second Level in 1989, the Campeonato Mato-Grossense in 2005, and the Copa Governador do Mato Grosso in 2009. Vila Aurora competed in the Copa do Brasil in 2006, when they were eliminated in the First Round by Santa Cruz. The club competed in the Série D in 2009, and in 2010, when they were eliminated in the Quarterfinals by Guarany de Sobral. They competed in the 2011 Série D, when they were eliminated in the First Stage of the competition.

== Honours ==
- Campeonato Mato-Grossense
  - Winner (1): 2005
- Copa Governador do Mato Grosso
  - Winners (1): 2009
- Campeonato Mato-Grossense Second Division
  - Winners (1): 1989

== Stadium ==
Sociedade Esportiva Vila Aurora play their home games at Estádio Engenheiro Luthero Lopes. The stadium has a maximum capacity of 18,000 people.
