= CE Operário Várzea-Grandense =

Operário-VG
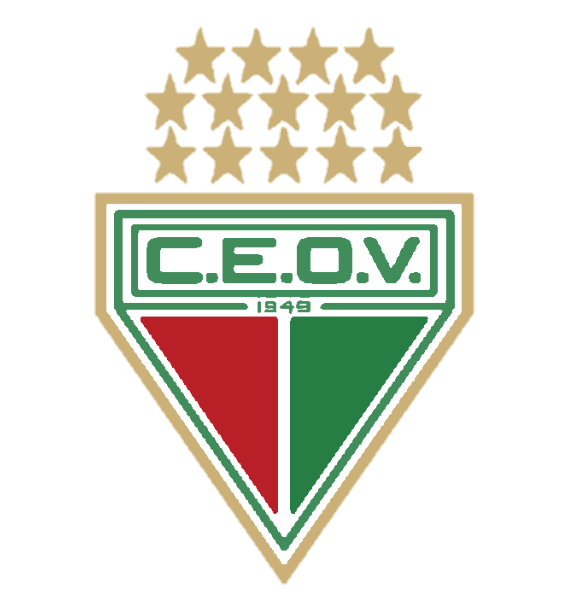
- Full name: Clube Esportivo Operário Várzea-Grandense
- Nicknames: Chicote da Fronteira (Frontier Whip); CEOV
- Founded: 1 May 1949; 77 years ago
- Ground: Estádio Dito Souza
- Capacity: 2,600
- Chairman: Eder Roberto Taques
- Head coach: Hugo Alcântara
- League: Campeonato Brasileiro Série D Campeonato Mato-Grossense
- 2025: Mato-Grossense, 4th of 10
Home colours	Away colours	Third colours

Clube Esportivo Operário Várzea-Grandense, often known as CEOV, Operário Várzea-Grandense, Operário-VG or simply Operário, is a Brazilian football team from Várzea Grande, Mato Grosso, founded on 1 May 1949.

== History ==
The club was founded on 1 May 1949, and won their first title in 1964 after lifting the Campeonato Mato-Grossense. The club won two consecutive Mato-Grossense titles in 1967 and 1968, before repeating the feat in 1972 and 1973.

Despite facing financial troubles in the 1980s, CEOV was the last club from Mato Grosso to play in the Série A (1986) before Cuiabá in 2021. In that decade, the club lifted three Mato-Grossense titles in a row, in 1985, 1986 and 1987.

They also played in the Série B and in the Série C during the 90s, winning two consecutive Mato-Grossense titles in 1994 and 1995 before being licensed due to high debts. In the club's place, Esporte Clube Operário was founded.

CEOV returned to an active status in 2002, as EC Operário was removed and subsequently dissolved for the club take their place. CEOV won their 12th Mato-Grossense in that year, but was still unable to cope with the debts; subsequently, the club was again licensed, and Operário Futebol Clube Ltda. was created to continue with the club's history.

In 2009, CEOV was again active to play in the year's Mato-Grossense Segunda Divisão, and a merger with Operário FC was proposed, but did not materialize. After another years licensed, the club played in the 2013 Segunda Divisão, facing their homonymous side and achieving promotion by finishing second.

== Honours ==
=== Official tournaments ===
State
Competitions	Titles	Seasons
Campeonato Mato-Grossense	12	1964, 1967, 1968, 1972, 1973, 1983, 1985, 1986, 1987, 1994, 1995, 2002
Copa FMF	1	2024

=== Runners-up ===
- Campeonato Mato-Grossense (7): 1961, 1981, 1982, 1993, 2015, 2019, 2021
- Copa FMF (1): 2022
- Campeonato Mato-Grossense Second Division (1): 2013

== Stadium ==
Operário play their home games at Verdão stadium. The stadium has a maximum capacity of 40,000 people.
