= Cacerense Esporte Clube =

Brazilian football club

Cacerense
- Full name: Cacerense Esporte Clube
- Nickname(s): Fera da Fronteira; Crocodilo do Pantanal
- Founded: 5 July 2005
- Ground: Geraldão
- Capacity: 5,000
- League: Campeonato Matogrossense Second Level
- 2022: 2nd of 11 (promoted)
Home colours	Away colours

Cacerense Esporte Clube, usually known simply as Cacerense, is a Brazilian football club from Cáceres, Mato Grosso state.

== History ==
On 10 June 1996, Cacerense Esporte Clube was founded.

In 2006, the club won its first title, which was the Governor of Mato Grosso Cup, beating Vila Aurora in the final, and thus being allowed to compete in the following year's Brazilian Championship Third Level.

In 2007, Cacerense won its second title, the Mato Grosso State Championship, finishing ahead of Jaciara. In the same year, the club competed in the Brazilian Championship Third Level.

== Honours ==
- Campeonato Matogrossense
  - Winners (1): 2007
- Copa Governador do Mato Grosso
  - Winners (1): 2006
