= Campeonato Mato-Grossense =

Football league in Mato Grosso, Brazil

- Organising body: FMF
- Founded: 1936; 90 years ago
- Country: Brazil
- State: Mato Grosso
- Level on pyramid: 1
- Relegation to: Mato-Grossense 2nd Division
- Domestic cup(s): Copa Verde; Copa do Brasil
- Current champions: Mixto (25th title) (2026)
- Most championships: Mixto (25 titles)
- Website: FMF Official website

The Campeonato Mato-Grossense is the top-flight professional state football league in the Brazilian state of Mato Grosso. It is run by the Mato Grosso Football Federation (FMF).

== List of champions ==
Following is the list with the champions of Campeonato Mato-Grossense:

Season	Champions	Runners-up
1936	Comércio (1)	Americano
1937	Mixto (1)	Dom Bosco
1938	Americano (1)	Comércio
1939–1940	Not held	
1941	Americano (2)	Dom Bosco
1942	Americano (3)	Dom Bosco
1943	Paulistano (1)	Mixto
1944	Not finished	
1945	Mixto (2)	Dom Bosco
1946	Not held	
1947	Mixto (3)	Americano
1948	Mixto (4)	Dom Bosco
1949	Mixto (5)	Americano
1950	Paulistano (2)	Mixto
1951	Mixto (6)	Dom Bosco
1952	Mixto (7)	Dom Bosco
1953	Mixto (8)	Palmeiras
1954	Mixto (9)	Dom Bosco
1955	Atlético Matogrossense (1)	Dom Bosco
1956	Atlético Matogrossense (2)	Mixto
1957	Atlético Matogrossense (3)	Mixto
1958	Dom Bosco (1)	Atlético Matogrossense
1959	Mixto (10)	Americano
1960	Atlético Matogrossense (4)	Palmeiras
1961	Mixto (11)	Operário Várzea-Grandense
1962	Mixto (12)	Palmeiras
1963	Dom Bosco (2)	Mixto
1964	Operário Várzea-Grandense (1)	Mixto
1965	Mixto (13)	Dom Bosco
1966	Dom Bosco (3)	Mixto
1967	Operário Várzea-Grandense (2)	Mixto
1968	Operário Várzea-Grandense (3)	Boa Vista
1969	Mixto (14)	Palmeiras
1970	Mixto (15)	Comercial
1971	Dom Bosco (4)	Mixto
1972	Operário Várzea-Grandense (4)	Comercial
1973	Operário Várzea-Grandense (5)	Mixto
1974	Operário de Campo Grande (1)	Dom Bosco
1975	Comercial (1)	União Rondonópolis
1976	Operário de Campo Grande (2)	Mixto
1977	Operário de Campo Grande (3)	Comercial
1978	Operário de Campo Grande (4)	Mixto
1979	Mixto (16)	Dom Bosco
1980	Mixto (17)	União Rondonópolis
1981	Mixto (18)	Operário Várzea-Grandense
1982	Mixto (19)	Operário Várzea-Grandense
1983	Operário Várzea-Grandense (6)	Mixto
1984	Mixto (20)	União Rondonópolis
1985	Operário Várzea-Grandense (7)	Mixto
1986	Operário Várzea-Grandense (8)	Mixto
1987	Operário Várzea-Grandense (9)	Mixto
1988	Mixto (21)	Barra do Garças
1989	Mixto (22)	Dom Bosco
1990	Sinop (1)	Dom Bosco
1991	Dom Bosco (5)	União Rondonópolis
1992	Sorriso (1)	Mixto
1993	Sorriso (2)	Operário Várzea-Grandense
1994	Operário Várzea-Grandense (10)	Dom Bosco
1995	Operário Várzea-Grandense (11)	União Rondonópolis
1996	Mixto (23)	Sinop
1997	EC Operário (1)	União Rondonópolis
1998	Sinop (2)	EC Operário
1999	Sinop (3)	Juventude
2000	Juventude (1)	Sinop
2001	Juventude (2)	Mixto
2002	Operário Várzea-Grandense (12)	Juventude
2003	Cuiabá (1)	Barra do Garças
2004	Cuiabá (2)	União Rondonópolis
2005	Vila Aurora (1)	Operário Ltda.
2006	Operário Ltda. (1)	Barra do Garças
2007	Cacerense (1)	Grêmio Jaciara
2008	Mixto (24)	União Rondonópolis
2009	Luverdense (1)	Araguaia
2010	União Rondonópolis (1)	Operário Ltda.
2011	Cuiabá (3)	Barra do Garças
2012	Luverdense (2)	Cuiabá
2013	Cuiabá (4)	Mixto
2014	Cuiabá (5)	Luverdense
2015	Cuiabá (6)	Operário Várzea-Grandense
2016	Luverdense (3)	Sinop
2017	Cuiabá (7)	Sinop
2018	Cuiabá (8)	Sinop
2019	Cuiabá (9)	Operário Várzea-Grandense
2020	Nova Mutum (1)	União Rondonópolis
2021	Cuiabá (10)	Operário Várzea-Grandense
2022	Cuiabá (11)	União Rondonópolis
2023	Cuiabá (12)	União Rondonópolis
2024	Cuiabá (13)	União Rondonópolis
2025	Primavera AC (1)	Cuiabá
2026	Mixto (25)	Luverdense

Notes

- Operário and Comercial from Campo Grande, Ubiratan from Dourados, and Corumbaense from Corumbá, disputed the Campeonato Matogrossense before the split of Mato Grosso do Sul, occurred in 1979.
- Due to financial problems, Operário Várzea-Grandense (also known as CEOV) withdrew from professional football in 1996. As it is one of the clubs with the most fans in the state, EC Operário was created with the same colors (red and green) as the traditional CEOV. Despite being state champion (1997), the club did not receive the expected support and closed its activities in 2002. Another club with a similar name was created (Operário Futebol Ltda.), this time with red and black colors in honor of CR Flamengo, and has won the 2006 tournament. Operário Ltda. currently competes in the second division and the original CEOV returned to professional football in 2013.

== Titles by team ==
Teams in bold stills active. Teams in italic currently disputes the Campeonato Sul-Mato-Grossense.

Rank	Club	Winners	Winning years
1	**Mixto**	25	1937, 1945, 1947, 1948, 1949, 1951, 1952, 1953, 1954, 1959, 1961, 1962, 1965, 1969, 1970, 1979, 1980, 1981, 1982, 1984, 1988, 1989, 1996, 2008, 2026
2	**Cuiabá**	13	2003, 2004, 2011, 2013, 2014, 2015, 2017, 2018, 2019, 2021, 2022, 2023, 2024
3	**Operário Várzea-Grandense**	12	1964, 1967, 1968, 1972, 1973, 1983, 1985, 1986, 1987, 1994, 1995, 2002
4	**Dom Bosco**	5	1958, 1963, 1966, 1971, 1991
5	**Atlético Matogrossense**	4	1955, 1956, 1957, 1960
5	**Operário de Campo Grande**	4	1974, 1976, 1977, 1978
7	Americano	3	1938, 1941, 1942
7	**Luverdense**	3	2009, 2012, 2016
7	**Sinop**	3	1990, 1998, 1999
11	Juventude	2	2000, 2001
11	**Paulistano**	2	1943, 1950
11	**Sorriso**	2	1992, 1993
16	**Cacerense**	1	2007
16	**Comercial**	1	1975
16	Comércio	1	1936
16	**Nova Mutum**	1	2020
16	EC Operário	1	1997
16	**Operário Ltda.**	1	2006
16	**Primavera AC**	1	2025
16	**União Rondonópolis**	1	2010
16	Vila Aurora	1	2005

=== By city ===
City	Championships	Clubs
Cuiabá	53	Mixto (25), Cuiabá (13), Dom Bosco (5), Atlético Matogrossense (4), Americano (3), Paulistano (2), Comércio (1)
Várzea Grande	14	Operário (CEOV) (12), EC Operário (1), Operário Ltda. (1)
Campo Grande	5	Operário (4), Comercial (1)
Lucas do Rio Verde	3	Luverdense (3)
Sinop	3	Sinop (3)
Primavera do Leste	3	Juventude (2), Primavera AC (1)
Rondonópolis	2	União Rondonópolis (1), Vila Aurora (1)
Sorriso	2	Sorriso (2)
Cáceres	1	Cacerense (1)
Nova Mutum	1	Nova Mutum (1)
