= Primavera do Leste =

Primavera do Leste, Mato Grosso
- Municipality
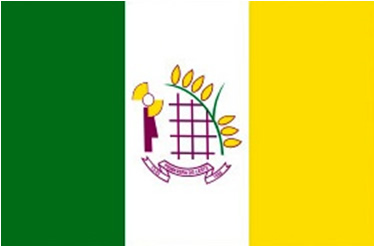
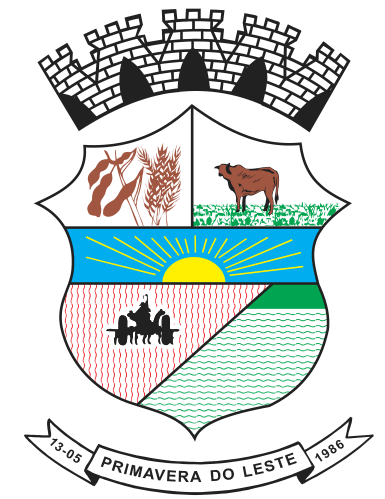
- Flag Coat of arms
- Nickname: Primavera PVA (PVA of Spring)
- Motto: Tempo do Crescer (Time to Grow)
- Location of Primavera do Leste in Mato Grosso

- Location in Brazil
- Coordinates: 15°31′40″S 54°20′45″W
- Country: Brazil
- Region: Center-West
- State: Mato Grosso
- Mesoregion: Sudeste Mato-Grossense
- Founded: May 13, 1986

Government
  - Mayor: Erico Piana Pinto Pereira

Area
  - Total: 2,112.831 sq mi (5,472.207 km^{2})
- Elevation: 2,087 ft (636 m)

Population (2020)
  - Total: 63,092
  - Density: 29.861/sq mi (11.530/km^{2})
- Time zone: UTC−4 (AMT)
- Demonym: primaverense

Primavera do Leste is a municipality in the state of Mato Grosso in the Central-West Region of Brazil.

== History ==
Primavera do Leste was discovered on 27 June 1985 and became municipality on 13 May 1986.

== Climate ==
Primavera do Leste has a tropical savanna climate (Köppen climate classification: Aw), the average temperature on summer is 34°C. On winter are warm, the temperature rises to 29°C. The wet season is on October to March, about 250mm.

== Transportation ==
The city is served by Primavera do Leste Airport.

== See also ==
- List of municipalities in Mato Grosso
