= 2012 Campeonato Brasileiro Série B =

Campeonato Brasileiro Série B
- Season: 2012
- Champions: Goiás (2nd title)
- Promoted: Goiás; Criciúma; Atlético Paranaense; Vitória
- Relegated: CRB; Guarani; Ipatinga; Barueri
- Matches played: 380
- Goals scored: 1,055 (2.78 per match)
- Top goalscorer: 27 goals: Zé Carlos
- Biggest home win: Joinville 6–0 Ipatinga (July 17, 2012)
- Biggest away win: Ipatinga 0–6 Goiás (August 3, 2012); Barueri 0–6 Atlético Paranaense (September 7, 2012)
- Highest scoring: 9 goals: Atlético Paranaense 5–4 América Mineiro

In 2012, the Campeonato Brasileiro Série B, the second level of the Brazilian League, was contested by 20 clubs from May 19 until November 24, 2012. The top four teams in the table have qualified to the Campeonato Brasileiro Série A to be contested in 2013, meanwhile the bottom four were relegated to Campeonato Brasileiro Série C. It's considered the sixth best "second division" of the world.

== Teams ==
=== Stadia and locations ===
Locations of the 2012 Série B teams

Team	Home city	Stadium	Capacity	2011 season
ABC	Natal	Frasqueirão	18,000	10th in Série B
América de Natal	Natal	Nazarenão	4,000	4th in Série C
América Mineiro	Belo Horizonte	Independência	23,000	19th in Série A
ASA	Arapiraca	Coaracy da Mata Fonseca	14,000	16th in Série B
Atlético Paranaense	Curitiba	Arena da Baixada	25,180	17th in Série A
Avaí	Florianópolis	Ressacada	17,800	20th in Série A
Boa Esporte	Varginha	Melão	15,400	7th in Série B
Bragantino	Bragança Paulista	Nabi Abi Chedid	13,200	6th in Série B
Ceará	Fortaleza	Presidente Vargas	20,600	18th in Série A
CRB	Maceió	Rei Pelé	18,500	2nd in Série C
Criciúma	Criciúma	Heriberto Hülse	22,000	14th in Série B
Goiás	Goiânia	Serra Dourada	50,000	11th in Série B
Grêmio Barueri	Barueri	Arena Barueri	35,000	9th in Série B
Guarani	Campinas	Brinco de Ouro	32,400	12th in Série B
Guaratinguetá	Guaratinguetá	Ninho da Garça	15,700	8th in Série B
Ipatinga	Ipatinga	Ipatingão	27,500	3rd in Série C
Joinville	Joinville	Arena Joinville	22,400	1st in Série C
Paraná	Curitiba	Vila Capanema	20,000	13th in Série B
São Caetano	São Caetano do Sul	Anacleto Campanella	16,700	15th in Série B
Vitória	Salvador	Barradão	35,600	5th in Série B

== League table ==
Pos	Team	Pld	W	D	L	GF	GA	GD	Pts	Promotion or relegation
1	Goiás (C, P)	38	23	9	6	75	37	+38	78	Promotion to Série A
2	Criciúma (P)	38	22	7	9	78	57	+21	73	Promotion to Série A
3	Atlético Paranaense (P)	38	21	8	9	65	37	+28	71	Promotion to Série A
4	Vitória (P)	38	21	8	9	59	43	+16	71	Promotion to Série A
5	São Caetano	38	20	11	7	58	38	+20	71	
6	Joinville	38	17	9	12	58	40	+18	60	
7	Avaí	38	18	5	15	44	42	+2	59	
8	América Mineiro	38	16	7	15	63	58	+5	55	
9	América de Natal	38	14	12	12	60	61	−1	54	
10	Paraná	38	14	9	15	49	46	+3	51	
11	Ceará	38	12	11	15	51	52	−1	47	
12	ABC	38	11	12	15	50	52	−2	45	
13	ASA	38	13	5	20	48	56	−8	44	
14	Bragantino	38	12	8	18	45	53	−8	44	
15	Boa Esporte	38	11	11	16	51	63	−12	44	
16	Guaratinguetá	38	13	4	21	41	63	−22	43	
17	CRB (R)	38	12	6	20	47	67	−20	42	Relegation to Série C
18	Guarani (R)	38	10	11	17	36	47	−11	41	Relegation to Série C
19	Ipatinga (R)	38	8	7	23	38	73	−35	31	Relegation to Série C
20	Grêmio Barueri (R)	38	7	9	22	38	69	−31	30	Relegation to Série C

Updated to match(es) played on 24 November 2012. Source: Campeonato Brasileiro Série B
Rules for classification: 1st points; 2nd wins; 3rd goal difference; 4th goals scored; 5th head-to-head results; 6th least red cards received; 7th least yellow cards received; 8th draw.
(C) Champions; (P) Promoted; (R) Relegated

== Results ==
Home \ Away	ABC	AMG	ARN	ASA	CAP	AVA	BAR	BOA	BRG	CEA	CRB	CRI	GOI	GRN	GRT	IPA	JEC	PAR	SCA	VIT
ABC		0–2	2–2	1–1	0–1	1–2	2–1	1–2	1–0	0–1	4–2	2–2	3–2	3–1	3–0	2–2	0–0	2–0	0–1	0–1
América Mineiro	3–3		1–1	0–1	3–2	1–0	1–2	3–2	3–2	1–3	4–0	3–0	1–2	1–1	2–1	3–1	0–2	0–0	2–5	1–2
América de Natal	1–0	1–1		2–0	0–2	1–0	2–1	4–4	2–1	1–1	3–3	1–4	5–2	1–0	4–1	2–1	3–1	2–1	0–2	2–2
ASA	3–1	3–2	0–2		2–3	1–0	1–1	3–2	1–1	3–0	2–4	1–2	0–1	1–0	3–1	3–0	1–0	1–1	4–1	2–3
Atlético Paranaense	2–1	5–4	1–1	1–0		3–1	3–0	2–1	0–0	2–1	4–1	1–0	0–0	1–1	3–0	1–0	1–1	1–1	0–1	0–1
Avaí	3–1	2–0	2–2	2–0	1–2		2–1	2–1	1–0	2–1	1–0	1–1	1–4	1–0	2–0	2–1	1–2	3–1	1–0	2–0
Barueri	0–3	0–1	2–3	1–0	0–6	2–0		1–2	0–0	0–0	0–0	1–4	2–0	2–2	2–3	2–0	1–1	1–2	2–2	0–1
Boa Esporte	0–0	2–1	1–1	3–2	2–1	2–2	4–1		3–0	1–0	0–0	0–4	2–2	1–2	0–1	2–1	0–0	2–1	1–3	1–2
Bragantino	1–2	2–0	1–0	2–2	2–1	1–0	2–2	3–0		1–3	0–2	3–4	3–3	0–0	1–0	0–2	1–0	3–3	2–3	3–0
Ceará	4–2	1–2	4–0	3–2	1–0	0–1	2–0	1–1	1–2		1–2	2–2	2–2	1–0	1–1	1–1	4–3	0–1	2–2	1–3
CRB	3–3	0–1	4–2	0–1	2–0	2–0	2–1	0–0	0–2	0–2		0–2	0–2	2–1	3–1	2–0	4–3	0–2	2–2	0–1
Criciúma	2–0	0–4	4–3	2–1	0–0	2–0	3–4	4–3	3–2	2–1	2–0		3–0	2–1	4–1	3–2	2–3	2–1	0–2	2–1
Goiás	1–1	2–0	1–0	4–0	3–2	2–0	3–0	2–0	1–0	0–0	1–0	1–0		5–0	1–1	4–0	2–1	2–0	0–0	4–3
Guarani	1–1	0–3	0–0	2–1	2–1	0–2	1–0	0–0	1–2	4–1	4–0	1–2	1–2		2–1	1–0	2–1	0–0	1–2	0–0
Guaratinguetá	2–1	1–2	0–2	2–1	0–1	1–1	2–1	0–0	2–0	2–1	1–2	2–1	0–3	2–1		3–1	0–3	2–0	0–1	1–0
Ipatinga	1–1	1–0	4–0	1–0	1–1	1–2	0–3	1–2	2–1	1–2	3–2	2–3	0–6	0–0	2–3		1–0	2–0	1–2	1–1
Joinville	0–0	2–2	1–0	1–0	1–4	1–0	4–0	3–0	1–0	1–1	3–1	3–1	1–0	2–0	2–1	6–0		3–1	0–0	1–1
Paraná	1–2	0–1	1–0	2–0	1–2	1–1	1–1	2–0	2–0	1–0	4–0	1–1	1–3	1–1	3–2	2–0	2–0		2–1	3–1
São Caetano	0–1	1–1	3–2	0–1	1–3	1–0	3–0	4–2	2–0	2–0	3–2	1–1	1–1	1–2	1–0	1–1	1–0	1–1		0–0
Vitória	1–0	5–3	2–2	2–0	0–2	2–0	1–0	3–2	0–1	1–1	1–0	2–2	3–1	1–0	2–0	4–0	2–1	4–3	0–1	

Updated to match(es) played on 24 November 2012. Source:
Legend: Blue = home team win; Yellow = draw; Red = away team win.
