= 2011 Campeonato Brasileiro Série B =

Campeonato Brasileiro Série B
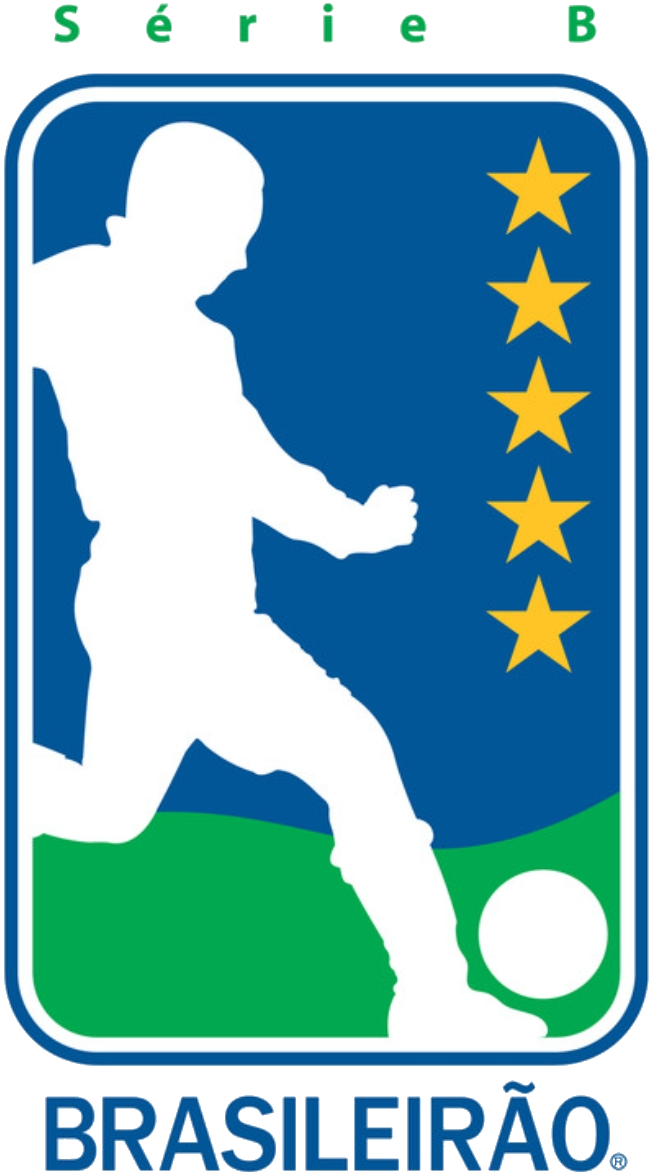
- Season: 2011
- Champions: Portuguesa (1st title)
- Promoted: Portuguesa; Náutico; Ponte Preta; Sport
- Relegated: Icasa; Vila Nova; Salgueiro; Duque de Caxias
- Matches: 380
- Goals: 1,012 (2.66 per match)
- Top goalscorer: 21 goals: Kieza
- Biggest home win: Ponte Preta 5–0 ASA de Arapiraca (May 21, 2011); Portuguesa 5–0 Bragantino (June 17, 2011)
- Biggest away win: ABC 0–5 Bragantino (August 30, 2011)
- Highest scoring: 8 goals: Bragantino 5–3 Salgueiro (August 13, 2011); Salgueiro 3–5 Icasa (August 16, 2011); Duque de Caxias 2–6 Bragantino (November 4, 2011)

The 2011 Campeonato Brasileiro Série B, the second level of the Brazilian League, was contested by 20 clubs from May 20 until November 26, 2011.

Portuguesa won their first title and were promoted to the 2012 Serie A, along with Nautico, Ponte Preta, and Sport Recife.

Icasa, Vila Nova, Salgueiro, and Duque de Caxias were all relegated to the 2012 Série C.

== Format ==
For the sixth consecutive season, the tournament will be played in a double round-robin system. The team with the most points will be declared champions. Top four clubs will ascend to Série A, meanwhile the bottom four will be relegated to Série C.

== Team information ==
Locations of the 2011 Série B teams

Team	City	Stadium	Capacity	2010 season
ABC	Natal	Frasqueirão	18,000	Série C 1st place (promoted)
Americana	Americana	Décio Vita	12,765	Série B 15th place
ASA de Arapiraca	Arapiraca	Coaracy da Mata Fonseca	10,000	Série B 10th place
Barueri	Barueri	Arena Barueri	35,000	Série A 20th place (relegated)
Boa Esporte	Varginha	Melão	27,000	Série C 2nd place (promoted)
Bragantino	Bragança Paulista	Nabi Abi Chedid	21,209	Série B 9th place
Criciúma	Criciúma	Heriberto Hülse	22,000	Série C 3rd place (promoted)
Duque de Caxias	Duque de Caxias	Marrentão	10,000	Série B 11th place
Goiás	Goiânia	Serra Dourada	45,000	Série A 19th place (relegated)
Guarani	Campinas	Brinco de Ouro da Princesa	40,988	Série A 18th place (relegated)
Icasa	Juazeiro do Norte	Romeirão	20,000	Série B 12th place
Náutico	Recife	Estádio dos Aflitos	30,000	Série B 13th place
Paraná	Curitiba	Vila Capanema	20,000	Série B 7th place
Ponte Preta	Campinas	Moisés Lucarelli	19,722	Série B 14th place
Portuguesa	São Paulo	Canindé	21,000	Série B 5th place
Salgueiro	Salgueiro	Cornélio de Barros	10,000	Série C 4th place (promoted)
São Caetano	São Caetano do Sul	Anacleto Campanella	22,738	Série B 8th place
Sport Recife	Recife	Ilha do Retiro	35,000	Série B 6th place
Vila Nova	Goiânia	Serra Dourada	45,000	Série B 16th place
Vitória	Salvador	Barradão	35,632	Série A 17th place (relegated)

== Standings ==
Pos	Team	Pld	W	D	L	GF	GA	GD	Pts	Promotion or relegation
1	Portuguesa (C, P)	38	23	12	3	82	38	+44	81	Promotion to Série A
2	Náutico (P)	38	17	13	8	51	41	+10	64	Promotion to Série A
3	Ponte Preta (P)	38	17	12	9	63	45	+18	63	Promotion to Série A
4	Sport Recife (P)	38	17	10	11	62	44	+18	61	Promotion to Série A
5	Vitória	38	17	9	12	61	48	+13	60	
6	Bragantino	38	16	10	12	65	53	+12	58	
7	Boa Esporte	38	16	9	13	44	40	+4	57	
8	Americana	38	15	11	12	40	45	−5	56	
9	Barueri	38	15	8	15	48	53	−5	53	
10	ABC	38	13	14	11	52	53	−1	53	
11	Goiás	38	16	4	18	51	57	−6	52	
12	Guarani	38	15	7	16	51	48	+3	52	
13	Paraná	38	14	10	14	48	44	+4	52	
14	Criciúma	38	13	12	13	43	43	0	51	
15	São Caetano	38	12	15	11	57	51	+6	51	
16	ASA	38	13	9	16	44	54	−10	48	
17	Icasa (R)	38	11	14	13	52	55	−3	47	Relegation to Série C
18	Vila Nova (R)	38	7	11	20	34	53	−19	32	Relegation to Série C
19	Salgueiro (R)	38	8	5	25	32	63	−31	26 (Note: Salgueiro was docked 3 points due to fielding a suspended player.)	Relegation to Série C
20	Duque de Caxias (R)	38	2	11	25	32	84	−52	17	Relegation to Série C

Updated to match(es) played on 5 November 2011. Source: CBF
Rules for classification: 1st points; 2nd wins; 3rd goal difference; 4th goals scored; 5th head-to-head results; 6th least red cards received; 7th least yellow cards received; 8th draw.
(C) Champions; (P) Promoted; (R) Relegated

== Results ==
Home \ Away	ABC	AMC	ASA	BAR	BOA	BRG	CRI	DUQ	GOI	GUA	ICA	NAU	PAR	PON	POR	SAL	SCA	SPT	VIL	VIT
ABC		3–1	1–1	2–2	2–0	0–5	1–1	3–0	2–0	2–1	1–1	1–0	1–1	1–1	1–1	1–1	2–2	3–0	1–2	0–0
Americana	2–1		1–1	1–0	2–1	1–1	0–0	1–1	1–3	1–2	1–0	0–0	1–0	0–2	2–3	1–0	1–0	2–1	2–1	0–0
ASA	4–3	2–1		1–1	2–1	2–1	3–1	2–0	1–1	3–2	2–1	1–2	4–2	1–2	2–0	0–1	0–0	1–1	1–0	1–2
Barueri	1–3	0–1	1–0		2–2	3–2	0–0	2–1	2–0	1–3	1–2	0–0	1–0	2–1	1–1	2–1	0–3	2–3	1–0	1–0
Boa Esporte	0–0	0–0	2–1	2–0		1–2	2–0	2–0	1–0	0–1	1–0	2–1	1–2	1–1	1–2	0–0	4–1	3–0	0–0	1–2
Bragantino	1–1	2–0	0–1	2–1	1–2		2–2	3–0	4–0	0–0	1–1	2–1	2–1	1–1	1–1	5–3	1–2	3–2	1–0	2–2
Criciúma	3–1	1–0	1–0	1–2	0–0	1–0		2–0	2–0	2–2	5–2	0–0	1–2	1–1	1–1	3–0	1–1	1–0	3–1	2–1
Duque de Caxias	1–0	0–2	2–1	2–3	2–2	2–6	1–2		2–3	0–2	1–1	0–0	0–0	0–2	0–0	1–2	1–3	1–1	1–1	2–3
Goiás	1–2	3–1	4–1	1–0	2–0	2–1	1–0	4–1		3–0	0–0	1–2	0–3	2–1	1–4	0–1	1–0	2–1	1–1	4–1
Guarani	1–2	1–2	0–1	3–0	2–0	3–1	4–2	4–0	2–0		0–1	3–1	1–1	0–3	0–2	1–2	1–0	1–1	0–1	0–0
Icasa	1–3	2–2	1–1	0–1	0–1	2–0	0–1	4–2	4–2	1–1		1–2	3–1	1–1	0–2	1–0	0–0	2–2	1–0	3–1
Náutico	2–0	3–2	1–0	2–1	3–1	2–2	2–1	1–1	1–0	2–0	2–2		1–1	2–2	0–0	1–0	2–1	2–0	4–2	2–0
Paraná	1–0	0–1	3–1	1–3	2–0	1–0	0–0	3–1	1–1	3–0	2–0	2–0		0–1	1–1	1–0	2–2	1–2	2–1	1–1
Ponte Preta	4–1	0–0	5–0	2–0	1–2	1–3	3–0	2–1	2–1	2–0	4–1	3–3	4–3		0–3	1–0	1–0	1–1	1–1	0–0
Portuguesa	2–3	0–0	2–0	4–2	1–1	5–0	2–0	4–0	3–0	3–2	3–3	4–0	2–1	2–1		1–0	5–2	2–2	0–1	3–2
Salgueiro	0–1	0–1	1–1	1–4	0–1	0–1	2–1	2–0	2–0	1–4	3–5	0–2	2–1	2–3	1–2		1–1	0–1	1–1	0–2
São Caetano	4–0	1–1	2–0	1–1	0–2	0–2	1–0	4–2	2–1	1–2	2–2	0–0	1–1	1–1	3–3	3–1		3–3	3–0	2–2
Sport Recife	2–0	4–0	3–0	1–0	4–1	1–1	0–0	1–1	0–1	3–1	1–0	2–0	3–0	3–1	2–3	3–0	1–3		2–0	4–0
Vila Nova	2–2	1–3	1–1	2–2	1–2	1–2	2–0	1–1	2–3	0–0	1–2	0–0	0–1	3–1	1–3	1–0	2–0	0–1		0–3
Vitória	1–1	5–2	1–0	1–2	0–1	4–1	3–1	5–1	3–2	0–1	1–1	3–2	1–0	2–0	0–2	5–1	1–2	2–0	1–0	

Updated to match(es) played on 5 November 2011. Source: CBF
Legend: Blue = home team win; Yellow = draw; Red = away team win.
