= 2009 Campeonato Brasileiro Série B =

Campeonato Brasileiro Série B
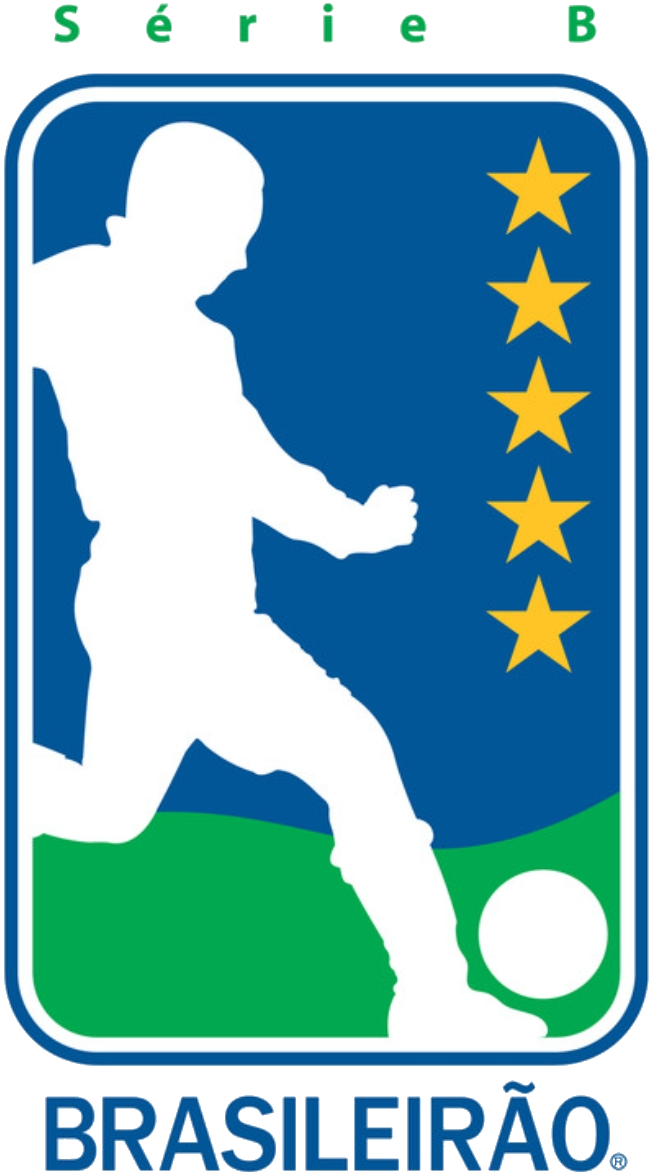
- Season: 2009
- Champions: Vasco da Gama (1st title)
- Promoted: Vasco da Gama; Guarani; Ceará; Atlético Goianiense
- Relegated: Juventude; Fortaleza; Campinense; ABC
- Goals: 1,056
- Average goals/game: 2.78
- Highest attendance: 78,609 − Vasco da Gama 2−1 Juventude, Round 34, Nov 7
- Lowest attendance: 5 − Duque de Caxias 4−1 Ponte Preta, Round 38, Nov 27

The 2009 Campeonato Brasileiro Série B, the second level of the Brazilian League, was contested by 20 clubs from May 8 to November 29, 2009. Top four teams in the table qualified for the 2010 Série A, meanwhile the bottom four were relegated to 2010 Série C.

Three former Brazilian champions played in this edition. Vasco da Gama was relegated for the first time in history, meanwhile Bahia and Guarani came back from Série C in 2007 and 2008, respectively. Also playing for the first time was Duque de Caxias, which was promoted along with Atlético Goianiense and Campinense. After spending a single season in Série A, Ipatinga and Portuguesa had returned to Série B along with Figueirense, which was playing top-level since 2002.

In the beginning of the tournament, Vasco was figuring in the middle of the table with 4 draws in 6 matches. Meanwhile, recently promoted Guarani had a promising start. However, another team which came from Séric C, Atlético Goianiense, managed to reach the top of the table. But when 4-time Brazilian champions woke up, no other team could stop them. Vasco took the lead in the end of the first half of the championship and never let it go. On round 34, after defeating Juventude 2−1 in a packed Maracanã Stadium, Vasco clinched their promotion. Two rounds later, in a crowded Maracanã Stadium again, the club from Rio de Janeiro reached the title after a 2−1 win against América de Natal. On round 37, Guarani and Atlético Goianiense also reached Série A along with Ceará, who did not start well but managed to comeback and reach the top-four group.

In the other side of the table, teams from Northeastern Brazil struggled to avoid relegation. Campinense stayed in the bottom four during the entire championship and their relegation was confirmed on round 37. In the very same day, ABC and Fortaleza also booked their trip to Série C, meanwhile 1988 Brazilian champions Bahia avoided relegation after flirting with it in the last rounds. Positive results from Brasiliense, Ipatinga and América de Natal on the last matchday sent Juventude to the third level of Brazilian football after spending 15 years in Séries A and B.

== Format ==
For the fourth consecutive season, the tournament was played in a double round-robin system. The team with most points has been declared champions. Top four clubs ascended to Série A, meanwhile the bottom four were relegated to Série C.

== Team information ==
Team	City	State	Stadium	Capacity	2008 season
ABC	Natal	(Rio Grande do Norte) RN	Frasqueirão	24,000	13th in Série B
América	Natal	(Rio Grande do Norte) RN	Machadão	35,000	15th in Série B
Atlético Goianiense	Goiânia	(Goiás) GO	Serra Dourada	60,000	Série C champions
Bahia	Salvador	(Bahia) BA	Jóia da Princesa	25,000	10 in Série B
Bragantino	Bragança Paulista	(São Paulo (state)) SP	Nabi Abi Chedid	21,209	7th in Série B
Brasiliense	Taguatinga	(Federal District (Brazil)) DF	Boca do Jacaré	32,000	14th in Série B
Ceará	Fortaleza	(Ceará) CE	Castelão	60,326	12th in Série B
Campinense	Campina Grande	(Paraíba) PB	Amigão	40,000	3rd in Série C
Duque de Caxias	Duque de Caxias	(Rio de Janeiro (state)) RJ	Marrentão	10,000	4th in Série C
Figueirense	Florianópolis	(Santa Catarina (state)) SC	Orlando Scarpelli	29,808	17th in Série A
Fortaleza	Fortaleza	(Ceará) CE	Castelão	60,326	16th in Série B
Guarani	Campinas	(São Paulo (state)) SP	Brinco de Ouro	30,988	Série C runners-up
Ipatinga	Ipatinga	(Minas Gerais) MG	Ipatingão	15,000	20th in Série A
Juventude	Caxias do Sul	(Rio Grande do Sul) RS	Alfredo Jaconi	30,519	8th in Série B
Paraná	Curitiba	(Paraná (state)) PR	Vila Capanema	20,083	11th in Série B
Ponte Preta	Campinas	(São Paulo (state)) SP	Moisés Lucarelli	19,722	5th in Série B
Portuguesa	São Paulo	(São Paulo (state)) SP	Canindé	25,470	19th in Série A
São Caetano	São Caetano do Sul	(São Paulo (state)) SP	Anacleto Campanella	22,738	9th in Série B
Vasco	Rio de Janeiro	(Rio de Janeiro (state)) RJ	São Januário	25,000	18th in Série A
Vila Nova	Goiânia	(Goiás) GO	Serra Dourada	60,000	6th in Série B

== Final standings ==
Pos	Team	Pld	W	D	L	GF	GA	GD	Pts	Promotion or relegation
1	Vasco da Gama (C, P)	38	22	10	6	58	29	+29	76	Promotion to Campeonato Brasileiro
2	Guarani (P)	38	21	6	11	55	51	+4	69	Promotion to Campeonato Brasileiro
3	Ceará (P)	38	19	11	8	54	34	+20	68	Promotion to Campeonato Brasileiro
4	Atlético Goianiense (P)	38	20	5	13	73	53	+20	65	Promotion to Campeonato Brasileiro
5	Portuguesa	38	18	8	12	53	45	+8	62	
6	Figueirense	38	19	3	16	64	51	+13	60	
7	São Caetano	38	15	9	14	52	38	+14	54	
8	Duque de Caxias	38	15	9	14	55	55	0	54	
9	Bragantino	38	15	8	15	52	51	+1	53	
10	Paraná	38	14	11	13	51	56	−5	53	
11	Ponte Preta	38	14	10	14	62	55	+7	52	
12	Bahia	38	14	9	15	52	53	−1	51	
13	Vila Nova	38	14	7	17	42	59	−17	49	
14	Brasiliense	38	14	6	18	45	56	−11	48	
15	Ipatinga	38	12	12	14	43	50	−7	48	
16	América-RN	38	13	7	18	49	61	−12	46	
17	Juventude (R)	38	12	8	18	46	50	−4	44	Relegation to Série C
18	Fortaleza (R)	38	10	8	20	56	64	−8	38	Relegation to Série C
19	Campinense (R)	38	11	4	23	54	79	−25	37	Relegation to Série C
20	ABC (R)	38	10	5	23	40	66	−26	35	Relegation to Série C

Source: CBF
Rules for classification: 1st points; 2nd wins; 3rd goal difference; 4th goals scored; 5th head-to-head results; 6th least red cards received; 7th least yellow cards received; 8th draw
(C) Champions; (P) Promoted; (R) Relegated

== Results ==
Home \ Away	ABC	ARN	ACG	BAH	BRG	BRS	CEA	CPN	DUQ	FIG	FOR	GUA	IPA	JUV	PAR	PON	POR	SCA	VAS	VIL
ABC		1–0	2–1	3–0	0–1	6–2	1–3	1–2	1–2	1–3	2–1	1–1	1–1	2–1	1–1	2–1	1–0	0–4	2–3	1–0
América-RN	1–0		1–2	4–1	1–4	2–1	1–5	4–4	0–1	1–0	2–1	3–1	1–0	0–2	3–1	1–2	4–0	0–0	2–2	2–0
Atlético Goianiense	2–0	4–1		0–3	3–1	5–1	4–1	1–0	3–0	3–2	3–1	4–1	2–2	2–1	5–0	1–1	0–1	2–0	2–2	2–1
Bahia	4–0	3–3	2–1		1–1	1–2	1–0	3–0	1–2	0–1	2–2	2–0	1–1	2–2	2–0	2–2	1–4	3–1	2–1	1–0
Bragantino	3–0	2–1	2–2	3–0		1–2	1–1	3–2	2–0	1–0	4–1	0–1	1–1	3–2	2–2	1–1	1–2	2–0	0–0	2–1
Brasiliense	1–1	0–0	0–1	3–0	2–1		0–1	2–1	1–1	0–4	1–0	1–2	2–0	2–0	0–1	3–0	3–2	2–2	0–1	2–1
Ceará	2–0	0–0	1–0	2–1	2–0	2–1		2–0	1–0	2–2	1–0	2–2	2–0	1–1	0–1	1–1	2–0	2–1	0–2	2–0
Campinense	3–1	0–1	2–1	1–2	2–0	1–0	1–3		1–2	4–2	2–4	1–2	5–1	1–0	2–2	2–3	3–3	2–1	0–1	2–3
Duque de Caxias	2–1	4–1	5–1	0–0	0–1	0–0	1–2	1–4		2–3	4–3	1–1	3–1	4–2	2–1	4–1	2–1	2–1	0–1	1–2
Figueirense	1–0	0–1	2–1	2–0	2–1	3–1	2–1	3–1	1–2		3–1	0–1	3–0	3–1	1–0	1–2	1–2	0–2	1–1	3–1
Fortaleza	3–3	3–0	0–1	3–2	1–2	2–3	0–0	3–0	1–1	3–1		2–4	1–0	3–2	4–0	2–1	0–1	1–2	1–1	2–2
Guarani	1–0	1–0	1–3	2–1	3–2	2–1	2–1	3–0	2–1	3–2	2–1		3–1	2–1	1–2	2–1	0–3	1–0	0–0	1–1
Ipatinga	2–1	2–2	1–0	0–0	2–0	5–2	0–0	5–1	1–0	2–2	0–1	1–0		0–1	1–1	0–0	0–3	0–2	2–0	4–0
Juventude	2–0	2–1	1–3	0–1	1–0	2–0	2–2	0–1	0–0	2–0	2–0	4–1	2–2		0–1	3–1	1–0	1–2	1–2	1–1
Paraná	1–3	2–1	2–1	1–2	4–1	0–2	3–3	3–0	1–1	0–4	1–1	2–0	2–0	1–1		0–0	0–2	1–0	3–1	3–0
Ponte Preta	2–0	4–0	3–1	1–3	2–1	2–0	1–2	3–0	4–1	0–1	1–1	0–1	1–2	3–0	3–3		5–2	1–3	1–1	3–1
Portuguesa	2–1	2–1	2–1	0–0	2–0	0–1	1–0	1–1	1–1	3–1	2–1	4–3	0–1	0–1	1–0	1–1		1–1	1–3	1–2
São Caetano	3–0	0–1	2–2	2–1	3–0	2–1	0–0	4–1	4–0	2–1	2–0	1–2	0–0	0–0	1–2	0–2	1–1		0–1	3–1
Vasco da Gama	3–0	2–1	3–0	2–1	0–0	1–0	0–2	3–0	0–0	1–2	2–1	1–0	4–0	2–1	2–1	3–0	0–1	0–0		4–1
Vila Nova	1–0	2–1	2–3	1–0	1–2	0–0	1–0	2–1	3–2	2–1	2–1	0–0	0–2	1–0	2–2	3–2	0–0	1–0	0–2	

Source: CBF (in Portuguese)
Legend: Blue = home team win; Yellow = draw; Red = away team win.

== Top scorers ==
Pos	Player	Club	Goals
1	(Brazil) Rafael Coelho	Figueirense	17
1	(Brazil) Marcelo Nicácio	Fortaleza	17
1	(Brazil) Élton	Vasco da Gama	17
4	(Brazil) Lúcio	América de Natal	15
4	(Brazil) Edivaldo	Duque de Caxias	15
6	(Brazil) Marcão	Atlético Goianiense	14
6	(Brazil) Edmundo	Campinense	14
6	(Brazil) Ricardo Xavier	Guarani	14
6	(Brazil) Mendes	Juventude	14
10	(Brazil) Geraldo	Ceará	13
10	(Brazil) Fernandes	Figueirense	13
10	(Brazil) Luiz Carlos	Fortaleza	13
