= 2010 Campeonato Brasileiro Série C =

Campeonato Brasileiro Série C
- Season: 2010
- Champions: ABC
- Promoted: Ituiutaba; Salgueiro; Criciúma; ABC
- Relegated: São Raimundo (PA); Alecrim; Gama; Juventude
- Matches: 94
- Goals: 208 (2.21 per match)
- Top goalscorer: 8 goals: Bruno Rangel
- Biggest home win: Paysandu 6-2 Rio Branco (AC) (July 17, 2010)
- Biggest away win: Gama 1-4 Macaé (July 18, 2010)
- Highest scoring: 8 goals: Paysandu 6-2 Rio Branco (AC) (July 17, 2010)
- Longest winning run: 3 games: Salgueiro (August 29-October 03)
- Longest unbeaten run: 11 games: Ituiutaba (July 25-November 13)
- Longest losing run: 3 games: Salgueiro (August 01-August 29); São Raimundo (PA) (August 29-September 12)
- Highest attendance: 24.188: Fortaleza 1-1 Rio Branco (AC) (September 11, 2010)
- Lowest attendance: 186: Ituiutaba 0-0 Gama (August 29, 2010)
- Average attendance: 5.301

In 2010, the Campeonato Brasileiro Série C, the third level of the Brazilian League, was contested by 20 clubs divided in four groups, followed by a playoff round, from July 18 to November 21, 2010. The top four clubs, the ones which qualified to the semifinals, were promoted to the Campeonato Brasileiro Série B to be contested in 2011. Meanwhile, the bottom four clubs, the ones that finished in last place of each group, were relegated to 2011 Série D.

== Team information ==
Team	City	State	Stadium	Capacity	2009 season
ABC	Natal	(Rio Grande do Norte) RN	Frasqueirão	18,000	Série B 20th place
Águia de Marabá	Marabá	(Pará) PA	Zinho de Oliveira	10,000	Série C 12th place
Alecrim	Natal	(Rio Grande do Norte) RN	Machadão	32,000	Série D 4th place
Brasil de Pelotas	Pelotas	(Rio Grande do Sul) RS	Bento Freitas	18,000	Série C 6th place
Campinense	Campina Grande	(Paraíba) PB	Amigão	35,000	Série B 19th place
Caxias	Caxias do Sul	(Rio Grande do Sul) RS	Centenário	30,434	Série C 5th place
Chapecoense	Chapecó	(Santa Catarina (state)) SC	Arena Condá	16,000	Série D 3rd place
CRB	Maceió	(Alagoas) AL	Rei Pelé	30,000	Série C 16th place
Criciúma	Criciúma	(Santa Catarina (state)) SC	Heriberto Hülse	19,900	Série C 15th place
Fortaleza	Fortaleza	(Ceará) CE	Castelão	60,326	Série B 18th place
Gama	Gama	(Federal District (Brazil)) DF	Bezerrão	20,000	Série C 14th place
Ituiutaba	Ituiutaba	(Minas Gerais) MG	Fazendinha	13,500	Série C 11th place
Juventude	Caxias do Sul	(Rio Grande do Sul) RS	Alfredo Jaconi	23,726	Série B 17th place
Luverdense	Lucas do Rio Verde	(Mato Grosso) MT	Paço das Emas	7,000	Série C 13th place
Macaé	Macaé	(Rio de Janeiro (state)) RJ	Cláudio Moacyr	16,000	Série D 2nd place
Marília	Marília	(São Paulo (state)) SP	Bento de Abreu	19,500	Série C 9th place
Paysandu	Belém	(Pará) PA	Estádio Olímpico do Pará	45,000	Série C 8th place
Rio Branco (AC)	Rio Branco	(Acre (state)) AC	Arena da Floresta	20,000	Série C 7th place
Salgueiro	Salgueiro	(Pernambuco) PE	Cornélio de Barros	6,000	Série C 10th place
São Raimundo (PA)	Santarém	(Pará) PA	Colosso do Tapajós	19,000	Série D 1st place

== Format ==
- First Stage: The 20 teams are divided in four groups of 5, playing within them in a double round-robin format. The two best ranked in each group advance towards next stage. The last placed team in each group is relegated to Série D 2011
- Quarterfinals: Eight qualified teams play in two-leg format, home and away. Winners qualify to semifinals and are promoted to Série B 2011.
- Semifinals: Quarterfinals winners play in two-leg format, home and away. Winners qualify to the Finals.
- Finals: Semifinals winners play in two-leg format, home and away. Winners are declared champions.

== Results ==
=== First stage ===
==== Group A (AC-CE-PA) ====
Team	Pld	W	D	L	GF	GA	GD	Pts	PAY	AGU	FOR	RBR	SRA
(Pará) Paysandu	8	4	2	2	15	9	+6	14		2–0	1–1	6–2	1–0
(Pará) Águia de Marabá	8	3	3	2	11	7	+4	12	2–1		1–1	4–0	1–1
(Ceará) Fortaleza	8	2	6	0	9	7	+2	12	1–1	0–0		1–1	2–1
(Acre (state)) Rio Branco (AC)	8	2	4	2	12	17	−5	10	3–1	2–1	0–0		3–3
(Pará) São Raimundo (PA)	8	0	3	5	8	15	−7	3	0–2	0–2	2–3	1–1	

==== Group B (AL-PB-PE-RN) ====
Team	Pld	W	D	L	GF	GA	GD	Pts	ABC	SAL	CRB	CPN	ALE
(Rio Grande do Norte) ABC	8	3	3	2	11	6	+5	12		3–1	3–1	0–0	1–1
(Pernambuco) Salgueiro	8	3	2	3	11	12	−1	11	0–3		3–0	2–1	2–2
(Alagoas) CRB	8	3	2	3	8	11	−3	11	1–0	1–1		2–1	0–0
(Paraíba) Campinense	8	3	1	4	7	7	0	10	1–0	2–0	0–1		2–1
(Rio Grande do Norte) Alecrim	8	2	4	2	9	10	−1	10	1–1	0–2	3–2	1–0	

==== Group C (DF-MT-MG-RJ-SP) ====
Team	Pld	W	D	L	GF	GA	GD	Pts	ITB	MCE	LUV	MAC	GAM
(Minas Gerais) Ituiutaba	8	4	3	1	9	4	+5	15		1–0	3–1	2–0	0–0
(Rio de Janeiro (state)) Macaé	8	4	2	2	12	8	+4	14	0–0		1–1	3–1	2–1
(Mato Grosso) Luverdense	8	3	3	2	12	10	+2	12	2–1	3–1		2–2	2–0
(São Paulo (state)) Marília	8	1	3	4	7	12	−5	6	1–2	0–1	1–0		2–2
(Federal District (Brazil)) Gama	8	0	5	3	5	11	−6	5	0–0	1–4	1–1	0–0	

==== Group D (RS-SC) ====
Team	Pld	W	D	L	GF	GA	GD	Pts	CRI	CHA	CAX	GEB	JUV
(Santa Catarina (state)) Criciúma	8	3	3	2	7	4	+3	12		2–0	1–0	2–0	1–1
(Santa Catarina (state)) Chapecoense	8	3	2	3	9	9	0	11	1–0		1–1	3–2	2–0
(Rio Grande do Sul) Caxias	8	2	4	2	6	6	0	10	1–0	2–1		0–0	2–2
(Rio Grande do Sul) Brasil de Pelotas	8	2	4	2	4	5	−1	10	0–0	0–0	1–0		0–0
(Rio Grande do Sul) Juventude	8	1	5	2	6	8	−2	8	1–1	2–1	0–0	0–1	

=== Knockout stages ===
Quarterfinals
1A	(Pará) Paysandu	1	2
2B	(Pernambuco) Salgueiro	1	3
1B	(Rio Grande do Norte) ABC	1	3
2A	(Pará) Águia de Marabá	0	1
1C	(Minas Gerais) Ituiutaba (a)	1	0
2D	(Santa Catarina (state)) Chapecoense	1	0
1D	(Santa Catarina (state)) Criciúma	2	2
2C	(Rio de Janeiro (state)) Macaé	3	0

Semifinals
(Pernambuco) Salgueiro	1	0
(Rio Grande do Norte) ABC	1	2
(Minas Gerais) Ituiutaba (p)	1	1
(Santa Catarina (state)) Criciúma	1	1

Finals
(Rio Grande do Norte) ABC	1	0
(Minas Gerais) Ituiutaba	0	0

(p) won on penalty shootout.
(a) won by away goals rule.

==== Quarterfinals ====
Paysandu vs. Salgueiro first leg played on October 9; Second leg played on October 17.
ABC vs. Águia de Marabá first leg played on October 16; Second leg played on October 24.
Ituiutaba vs. Chapecoense first leg played on October 9; Second leg played on October 16.
Criciúma vs. Macaé first leg played on October 10; Second leg played on October 23.

Team 1	Agg.	Team 2	1st leg	2nd leg
Paysandu (Pará)	3-4	(Pernambuco) Salgueiro	1-1	2-3
ABC (Rio Grande do Norte)	4-1	(Pará) Águia de Marabá	1-0	3-1
Ituiutaba (Minas Gerais)	1-1 (a)	(Santa Catarina (state)) Chapecoense	1-1	0-0
Criciúma (Santa Catarina (state))	4-3	(Rio de Janeiro (state)) Macaé	2-3	2-0

Team #1 played second match at home.

==== Semifinals ====
First leg played on October 30. Second leg played on November 6 and 07

Team 1	Agg.	Team 2	1st leg	2nd leg
ABC (Rio Grande do Norte)	3-1	(Pernambuco) Salgueiro	1-1	2-0
Ituiutaba (Minas Gerais)	2-2 (p 4-2)	(Santa Catarina (state)) Criciúma	1-1	1-1

Team #1 played second match at home.

=== Finals ===
All times Brazilian Daylight Saving Time

13 November 2010
17:00

Ituiutaba (Minas Gerais)	0 – 1	(Rio Grande do Norte) ABC
		71' Cascata

Parque do Sabiá, Uberlândia
Referee: Luis Flávio de Oliveira

20 November 2010
17:00

ABC (Rio Grande do Norte)	0 – 0	(Minas Gerais) Ituiutaba

Frasqueirão, Natal
Referee: Wallace Nascimento Valente

ABC won 1–0 on aggregate.

2010 Campeonato Brasileiro Série C winners

1st title

== Aggregate table ==
Team	Pld	W	D	L	GF	GA	GD	Pts	Promotion or relegation
(Rio Grande do Norte) ABC (C, P)	14	7	5	2	19	8	+11	26	Champions: promotion to 2011 Campeonato Brasileiro Série B
(Minas Gerais) Ituiutaba (P)	14	4	8	2	12	8	+4	20	Playoff semifinalists: promotion to 2011 Campeonato Brasileiro Série B
(Santa Catarina (state)) Criciúma (P)	12	4	5	3	15	9	+6	17	Playoff semifinalists: promotion to 2011 Campeonato Brasileiro Série B
(Pernambuco) Salgueiro (P)	12	4	4	4	16	18	−2	16	Playoff semifinalists: promotion to 2011 Campeonato Brasileiro Série B
(Rio de Janeiro (state)) Macaé	10	5	2	3	15	12	+3	17	Playoff quarterfinalists: no promotion
(Pará) Paysandu	10	4	3	3	18	13	+5	15	Playoff quarterfinalists: no promotion
(Santa Catarina (state)) Chapecoense	10	3	4	3	10	10	0	13	Playoff quarterfinalists: no promotion
(Pará) Águia de Marabá	10	3	3	4	12	11	+1	12	Playoff quarterfinalists: no promotion
(Mato Grosso) Luverdense	8	3	3	2	12	10	+2	12	
(Ceará) Fortaleza	8	2	6	0	9	7	+2	12	
(Alagoas) CRB	8	3	2	3	8	11	−3	11	
(Paraíba) Campinense	8	3	1	4	7	7	0	10	
(Rio Grande do Sul) Caxias	8	2	4	2	6	6	0	10	
(Rio Grande do Sul) Brasil de Pelotas	8	2	4	2	4	5	−1	10	
(Acre (state)) Rio Branco (AC)	8	2	4	2	12	17	−5	10	
(São Paulo (state)) Marília	8	1	3	4	7	12	−5	6	
(Rio Grande do Norte) Alecrim (R)	8	2	4	2	9	10	−1	10	Relegation to 2011 Campeonato Brasileiro Série D
(Rio Grande do Sul) Juventude (R)	8	1	5	2	6	8	−2	8	Relegation to 2011 Campeonato Brasileiro Série D
(Federal District (Brazil)) Gama (R)	8	0	5	3	5	11	−6	5	Relegation to 2011 Campeonato Brasileiro Série D
(Pará) São Raimundo (PA) (R)	8	0	3	5	8	15	−7	3	Relegation to 2011 Campeonato Brasileiro Série D

(C) Champions; (P) Promoted; (R) Relegated

== Top goalscorers ==
Pos	Name	Club	Goals
1	(Brazil) Bruno Rangel	Paysandu	8
2	(Brazil) Cascata	ABC	5
2	(Brazil) Felipe Mamão	Águia de Marabá	5
