= Associação Esportiva Recreativa Engenheiro Beltrão =

Brazilian football club

Engenheiro Beltrão
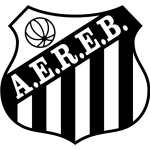
- Full name: Associação Esportiva Recreativa Engenheiro Beltrão
- Nicknames: Alvinegro; Caçula do interior
- Founded: January 1, 2003
- Ground: Estádio Municipal João Cavalcanti de Menezes
- Capacity: 5.000
- 2008: Campeonato Brasileiro Série C, eliminated in first stage
Home colours	Away colours

Associação Esportiva Recreativa Engenheiro Beltrão, usually known simply as Engenheiro Beltrão, is a Brazilian football team from the city of Engenheiro Beltrão, Paraná state, founded on January 1, 2003.
