= 2011 Campeonato Brasileiro Série C =

Campeonato Brasileiro Série C
- Season: 2011
- Biggest home win: Paysandu 5–0 Araguaína (24 July)
- Biggest away win: Fortaleza 1–3 América RN (23 July)
- Highest scoring: Santo André 2–3 Brasil de Pelotas (17 July)

In 2011, the Campeonato Brasileiro Série C, the third level of the Brazilian League, will be contested by 20 clubs divided in four groups, followed by a playoff round, during 16 July and 13 November. The top four clubs, the ones which qualifies to the semifinals, will be promoted to the Campeonato Brasileiro Série B to be contested in 2012. Meanwhile, the bottom four clubs, the ones that finish in last place of each group, will be relegated to 2012 Série D.

== Team information ==
Locations of the 2011 Série C teams (sorted by groups)

Team	City	Stadium	Capacity	2010 season
Águia de Marabá	Marabá	Zinho de Oliveira	5,000	Série C 8th place
América (RN)	Natal	Machadão	35,000	Série B 19th place (relegated)
Araguaína	Araguaína	Mirandão	10,000	Série D 3rd place (promoted)
Brasil de Pelotas	Pelotas	Bento Freitas	18,000	Série C 14th place
Brasiliense	Brasília	Boca do Jacaré	32,000	Série B 17th place (relegated)
Campinense	Campina Grande	Amigão	35,000	Série C 12th place
Caxias	Caxias do Sul	Centenário	30,434	Série C 13th place
Chapecoense	Chapecó	Arena Condá	15,000	Série C 7th place
CRB	Maceió	Rei Pelé	30,000	Série C 11th place
Fortaleza	Fortaleza	Castelão	60,326	Série C 10th place
Guarany de Sobral	Sobral	Estádio do Junco	15,000	Série D 1st place (promoted)
Ipatinga	Ipatinga	Ipatingão	20,500	Série B 20th place (relegated)
Joinville	Joinville	Arena Joinville	22,500	Série D 4th place (promoted)
Luverdense	Lucas do Rio Verde	Paço das Emas	7,000	Série C 9th place
Macaé	Macaé	Cláudio Moacyr de Azevedo	15,000	Série C 5th place
Madureira	Rio de Janeiro	Conselheiro Galvão	10,000	Série D 2nd place (promoted)
Marília	Marília	Bento de Abreu	19,500	Série C 16th place
Paysandu	Belém	Curuzu	16,500	Série C 6th place
Rio Branco (AC)	Rio Branco	Arena da Floresta	20,000	Série C 15th place
Santo André	Santo André	Bruno José Daniel	18,000	Série B 18th place (relegated)

== Format ==
- First Stage: The 20 teams are divided in four groups of 5, playing within them in a double round-robin format. The two best ranked in each group advance towards next stage. The last placed team in each group is relegated to Série D 2012
- Second Stage: The eight qualified teams are divided in two groups of 4, playing within them in a double round-robin format. The two best ranked in each group are promoted to Série B 2012.Winners qualify to the Finals.
- Finals: Second stage winners play in two-leg format, home and away. Winners are declared champions.

=== Tiebreakers ===
If two or more teams are equal on points on completion of the group matches, the following criteria are applied to determine the rankings

1. Higher number of wins
2. Superior goal difference
3. Higher number of goals scored

== First stage ==
=== Group A (North) ===
Pos	Team	Pld	W	D	L	GF	GA	GD	Pts	Qualification or relegation
1	Paysandu	8	4	2	2	13	7	+6	14	Advances to Second Stage
2	Luverdense	8	4	1	3	11	6	+5	13	Advances to Second Stage
3	Águia de Marabá	8	4	1	3	11	8	+3	13	
4	Rio Branco-AC	8	5	1	2	12	10	+2	16 (Note: Rio Branco/AC was excluded from the competition due to having appealed to the common courts about the interdiction of their stadium.)	Relegation to Série D
5	Araguaína	8	0	1	7	3	19	−16	1	Relegation to Série D

=== Group B (Northeast) ===
Pos	Team	Pld	W	D	L	GF	GA	GD	Pts	Qualification or relegation
1	América de Natal	8	5	1	2	16	8	+8	16	Advances to Second Stage
2	CRB	8	3	2	3	7	13	−6	11	Advances to Second Stage
3	Guarany de Sobral	8	2	3	3	9	9	0	9	
4	Fortaleza	8	2	3	3	11	12	−1	9	
5	Campinense	8	2	3	3	7	8	−1	9	Relegation to Série D

=== Group C (Southeast/Central-West) ===
Pos	Team	Pld	W	D	L	GF	GA	GD	Pts	Qualification or relegation
1	Ipatinga	8	6	0	2	15	8	+7	18	Advances to Second Stage
2	Brasiliense	8	4	1	3	8	5	+3	13	Advances to Second Stage
3	Madureira	8	3	1	4	7	8	−1	10	
4	Macaé	8	2	2	4	14	17	−3	8	
5	Marília	8	2	2	4	11	17	−6	8	Relegation to Série D

=== Group D (South/Southeast) ===
Pos	Team	Pld	W	D	L	GF	GA	GD	Pts	Qualification or relegation
1	Chapecoense	8	5	1	2	13	7	+6	16	Advances to Second Stage
2	Joinville	8	4	3	1	17	11	+6	15	Advances to Second Stage
3	Caxias	8	2	2	4	11	14	−3	8	
4	Santo André	8	2	2	4	8	13	−5	8	
5	Brasil de Pelotas	8	2	2	4	11	15	−4	2 (Note: Brasil de Pelotas was deducted six points for fielding an ineligible player.)	Relegation to Série D

== Second stage ==
=== Group E ===
Pos	Team	Pld	W	D	L	GF	GA	GD	Pts	Promotion or qualification
1	CRB	6	3	3	0	7	2	+5	12	Promoted and Qualified to the Finals
2	América-RN	6	2	3	1	6	4	+2	9	Promoted
3	Paysandu	6	2	1	3	5	8	−3	7	
4	Luverdense	6	0	3	3	4	8	−4	3	

=== Group F ===
Pos	Team	Pld	W	D	L	GF	GA	GD	Pts	Promotion or qualification
1	Joinville	6	5	1	0	14	5	+9	16	Promoted and Qualified to the Finals
2	Ipatinga	6	3	0	3	9	11	−2	9	Promoted
3	Chapecoense	6	1	2	3	12	12	0	5	
4	Brasiliense	6	1	1	4	9	16	−7	4	

== Finals ==
First leg

26 November 2011

CRB (Alagoas)	1–3	(Santa Catarina (state)) Joinville
Geovani 53'		Filipe 10' (o.g.); Glaydson 23'; Aldair 90+3'

Estádio Rei Pelé, Maceió
Attendance: 15557
Referee: (Minas Gerais) Alício Pena Júnior

Second leg

3 December 2011

Joinville (Santa Catarina (state))	4–0	(Alagoas) CRB
Lima 45+1'; Eduardo 75'; Pedro Paulo 79'; Gilton 86'

Arena Joinville, Joinville
Attendance: 19115
Referee: (Rio Grande do Sul) Fabrício Neves Corrêa

== Final standings ==
Note that no round-robin will be played involving all clubs; positions will depend on individual scoring.

Pos	Team	Pld	W	D	L	GF	GA	GD	Pts	Promotion or relegation
1	Joinville (C, P)	16	11	4	1	38	16	+22	37	Promotion to Série B
2	CRB (P)	16	6	5	5	15	22	−7	23	Promotion to Série B
3	Ipatinga (P)	14	9	0	5	24	19	+5	27	Promotion to Série B
4	América de Natal (P)	14	7	4	3	22	12	+10	25	Promotion to Série B
5	Chapecoense	14	6	3	5	25	19	+6	21	
6	Paysandu	14	6	3	5	18	15	+3	21	
7	Brasiliense	14	5	2	7	17	21	−4	17	
8	Luverdense	14	4	4	6	15	14	+1	16	
9	Águia de Marabá	8	4	2	2	11	8	+3	14	
10	Madureira	8	3	1	4	7	8	−1	10	
11	Guarany de Sobral	8	2	3	3	9	9	0	9	
12	Fortaleza	8	2	3	3	11	12	−1	9	
13	Macaé	8	2	2	4	14	17	−3	8	
14	Caxias	8	2	2	4	11	14	−3	8	
15	Santo André	8	2	2	4	8	13	−5	8	
16	Campinense (R)	8	2	3	3	7	8	−1	9	Relegation to Série D
17	Marília (R)	8	2	2	4	11	17	−6	8	Relegation to Série D
18	Brasil de Pelotas (R)	8	2	2	4	11	15	−4	2	Relegation to Série D
19	Araguaína (R)	8	0	1	7	3	19	−16	1	Relegation to Série D
20	Rio Branco-AC (R, D)	8	5	1	2	12	10	+2	16	Relegation to Série D

Rules for classification: 1st stage classification; 2nd points; 3rd wins; 4th goal difference; 5th goals scored; 6th head-to-head results; 7th least red cards received; 8th least yellow cards received; 9th draw
(C) Champions; (D) Disqualified; (P) Promoted; (R) Relegated
