= 2008 Campeonato Brasileiro Série C =

Campeonato Brasileiro Série C
- Season: 2008
- Champions: Atlético Goianiense; 2nd Série C title
- Promotion to Série B 2009: Atlético Goianiense; Guarani; Campinense; Duque de Caxias
- Goals scored: 1,080
- Average goals/game: 2.77
- Biggest home win: Atlético Goianiense 7-1 Itumbiara (2008 Sep 06)
- Biggest away win: Mixto 0–5 Duque de Caxias (2008 Sep 17)
- Highest scoring: Atlético Goianiense 6–4 Dom Pedro II (10 goals) (2008 Aug 17)
- Highest attendance: 23,393 – Remo v Luverdense
- Lowest attendance: 22 – Marcílio Dias v Ituiutaba

In 2008, the Campeonato Brasileiro Série C, the third division of the Brazilian League, was contested by 64 clubs, four of which qualified to the Série B. For the second time in history, Atlético Goianiense were crowned Série C champions. Following them, former Série A champions Guarani were also promoted, along with Campinense and Duque de Caxias. The new, revamped 20-club round robin Série C in 2009, will be contested by the clubs which finished from 5th to 20th this season, plus the four relegated from Série B 2008.

== Competition format ==
=== First stage ===
The 64 teams play in 16 groups of four. Within each group, the four teams play a double round robin, i.e. they play each other in home and away matches, totalling six matchdays. The two best ranked teams in each group qualify to the Second Stage.

=== Second stage ===
The 32 teams qualified from the First Stage play in eight groups of four. Within each group, the four teams play a double round robin, i.e. they play each other in home and away matches, totalling six matchdays. The two best ranked teams in each group qualify to the Third Stage.

=== Third stage ===
The 16 teams qualified from the Second Stage play in four groups of four. Within each group, the four teams play a double round robin, i.e. they play each other in home and away matches, totalling six matchdays. The two best ranked teams in each group qualify to the Final Stage.

=== Final stage ===
The eight teams qualified from the Third Stage are put together in a single group. They play a double round robin, i.e. they play each other in home and away matches, totalling fourteen matchdays. The four best ranked teams are automatically promoted to the Série B in 2009.

=== Teams ===
Sorted by state. Each state federation has its own criteria to indicate a club to this tournament. Only teams which do not take place in Série A and Série B are being considered.

State	Team	City	Qualification criteria
Acre	Rio Branco	Rio Branco	2008 State Championship 1st Stage winners
Alagoas	CSA	Maceió	2008 State Championship winners
Alagoas	ASA	Arapiraca	2008 State Championship runners-up
Amapá	Cristal	Macapá	2007 State Championship runners-up^{1}
Amazonas	Holanda	Rio Preto da Eva	2008 State Championship winners
Amazonas	Fast Clube	Manaus	2008 State Championship runners-up
Bahia	Vitória da Conquista	V. da Conquista	Best record in 2008 State Championship 1st Stage
Bahia	Itabuna	Itabuna	2nd best record in 2008 State Championship 1st Stage
Bahia	Atlético	Alagoinhas	3rd best record in 2008 State Championship 1st Stage
Ceará	Icasa	Juazeiro do Norte	2008 State Championship 1st Stage winners
Ceará	Horizonte	Horizonte	2008 State Championship 2nd Stage runners-up
Distrito Federal	Dom Pedro II	Guará	Best record in 2008 Metropolitan Championship
Distrito Federal	Legião	Brasília	2nd best record in 2008 Metropolitan Championship
Espírito Santo	Serra	Serra	2008 State Championship winners
Espírito Santo	Linhares	Linhares	2008 State Championship 3rd place^{2}
Goiás	Itumbiara	Itumbiara	2008 State Championship
Goiás	Atlético Goianiense	Goiânia	2nd best record in 2008 State Championship
Goiás	Anápolis	Anápolis	3rd best record in 2008 State Championship
Maranhão	Bacabal	Bacabal	2008 City of São Luís Trophy winners
Maranhão	Sampaio Corrêa	São Luís	2008 City of São Luís Trophy runners-up
Mato Grosso	Mixto	Cuiabá	2008 State Championship winners
Mato Grosso	Luverdense	Lucas do Rio Verde	2008 Governor's Cup winners
Mato Grosso do Sul	Águia Negra	Rio Brilhante	2008 State Championship Group A winners
Mato Grosso do Sul	Operário	Campo Grande	2008 State Championship Group B winners
Minas Gerais	Tupi	Juiz de Fora	Best record in 2008 State Championship
Minas Gerais	Ituiutaba	Ituiutaba	2nd best record in 2008 State Championship
Minas Gerais	América Mineiro	Belo Horizonte	2007 Taça Minas Gerais 3rd place^{3}
Pará	Águia de Marabá	Marabá	2008 State Championship 1st Stage winners
Pará	Paysandu	Belém	2008 State Championship 2nd Stage winners
Pará	Remo	Belém	Relegated from Série B 2007
Paraíba	Campinense	Campina Grande	2008 State Championship winners
Paraíba	Treze	Campina Grande	2008 State Championship runners-up
Paraná	Toledo	Toledo	Best record in 2008 State Championship
Paraná	Engenheiro Beltrão	Engenheiro Beltrão	2nd Best record in 2008 State Championship
Paraná	J. Malucelli	Curitiba	2007 Copa Paraná winners
Pernambuco	Central	Caruaru	Best record in 2008 State Championship
Pernambuco	Salgueiro	Salgueiro	2nd best record in 2008 State Championship
Pernambuco	Petrolina^{4}	Petrolina	5th best record in 2008 State Championship
Pernambuco	Santa Cruz	Recife	Relegated from Série B 2007
Piauí	Barras	Barras	2008 State Championship winners
Piauí	Picos	Picos	2008 State Championship runners-up
Rio de Janeiro	Madureira	Rio de Janeiro	Best record in 2008 State Championship
Rio de Janeiro	Boavista	Saquarema	2nd best record in 2008 State Championship
Rio de Janeiro	Macaé	Macaé	3rd best record in 2008 State Championship
Rio de Janeiro	Duque de Caxias	Duque de Caxias	2007 Copa Rio 6th Place
Rio Grande do Norte	Santa Cruz	Santa Cruz	2008 State Championship 1st Stage runners-up
Rio Grande do Norte	Potiguar	Mossoró	2008 State Championship 2nd Stage winners
Rio Grande do Sul	Internacional	Santa Maria	Best record in 2008 State Championship
Rio Grande do Sul	Caxias	Caxias do Sul	2nd best record in 2008 State Championship
Rio Grande do Sul	Brasil	Pelotas	2007 Copa FGF runners-up^{5}
Rondônia	It will not have representative^{6}
Roraima	Progresso	Mucajaí	2008 State Championship 1st Stage winners
São Paulo	Guaratinguetá	Guaratinguetá	Best record in 2008 State Championship
São Paulo	Mirassol	Mirassol	2nd best record in 2008 State Championship
São Paulo	Noroeste	Bauru	3rd best record in 2008 State Championship
São Paulo	Guarani	Campinas	4th best record in 2008 State Championship
São Paulo	Linense	Lins	2007 Copa FPF winners
São Paulo	Paulista	Jundiaí	Relegated from Série B 2007
São Paulo	Ituano	Itu	Relegated from Série B 2007
Santa Catarina	Metropolitano	Blumenau	Best record in 2008 State Championship
Santa Catarina	Marcílio Dias	Itajaí	2007 Copa Santa Catarina winners
Sergipe	Confiança	Aracaju	2008 State Championship winners
Sergipe	Sergipe	Aracaju	2008 State Championship runners-up
Tocantins	Palmas	Palmas	2007 State Championship winners

^{1} State Championship winners Trem withdrew.
^{2} State Championship runners-up Rio Bananal withdrew.
^{3} 2007 Taça Minas Gerais champions Ituiutaba and runners-up Tupi qualified via Campeonato Mineiro.
^{4} Ypiranga withdrew.
^{5} 2007 Copa FGF winners Caxias qualified via Campeonato Gaúcho.
^{6} Ulbra withdrew and no other team was interested in the vacancy.

== Results ==
=== First stage ===
==== Group 1 (AC-AM-MT) ====
Pos	Team	Pld	W	D	L	GF	GA	GD	Pts	RBR	LUV	FST
1	(Acre (state)) Rio Branco	4	3	0	1	14	7	+7	9		5–2	3–0
2	(Mato Grosso) Luverdense	4	3	0	1	11	8	+3	9	4–2		3–0 (Note: Walkover)
3	(Amazonas (Brazilian state)) Fast Clube	4	0	0	4	2	12	−10	0	1–4	1–2	

==== Group 2 (AP-AM-PA-RR) ====
Pos	Team	Pld	W	D	L	GF	GA	GD	Pts	HOL	REM	CRI	APC
1	(Amazonas (Brazilian state)) Holanda	6	4	0	2	11	8	+3	12		4–3	2–0	3–1
2	(Pará) Remo	6	3	2	1	12	5	+7	11	3–0		0–0	4–0
3	(Amapá) Cristal	6	2	2	2	5	5	0	8	1–0	1–1		2–0
4	(Roraima) Progresso	6	1	0	5	3	13	−10	3	0–2	0–1	2–1	

==== Group 3 (MA-PA-TO) ====
Pos	Team	Pld	W	D	L	GF	GA	GD	Pts	AGU	PAY	BAC	PAL
1	(Pará) Águia de Marabá	6	3	1	2	13	10	+3	10		1–1	2–3	4–2
2	(Pará) Paysandu	6	2	3	1	7	5	+2	9	3–1		0–0	2–1
3	(Maranhão) Bacabal	6	2	2	2	8	7	+1	8	1–2	1–1		3–1
4	(Tocantins) Palmas	6	2	0	4	6	12	−6	6	0–3	1–0	1–0	

==== Group 4 (CE-MA-PI) ====
Pos	Team	Pld	W	D	L	GF	GA	GD	Pts	PIC	SCO	BAR	HOR
1	(Piauí) Picos	6	2	4	0	3	1	+2	10		0–0	0–0	1–0
2	(Maranhão) Sampaio Corrêa	6	2	3	1	6	4	+2	9	0–0		0–0	2–1
3	(Piauí) Barras	6	2	2	2	4	4	0	8	0–1	2–1		1–0
4	(Ceará) Horizonte	6	1	1	4	5	9	−4	4	1–1	1–3	2–1	

==== Group 5 (PB-PE-RN) ====
Pos	Team	Pld	W	D	L	GF	GA	GD	Pts	CAM	SCR	POT	CEN
1	(Paraíba) Campinense	6	3	2	1	11	6	+5	11		2–1	6–2	0–1
2	(Pernambuco) Santa Cruz	6	2	2	2	7	6	+1	8	1–1		2–0	3–0
3	(Rio Grande do Norte) Potiguar	6	2	1	3	9	10	−1	7	1–2	3–0		3–0
4	(Pernambuco) Central	6	1	3	2	1	6	−5	6	0–0	0–0	0–0	

==== Group 6 (CE-PB-PE-RN) ====
Pos	Team	Pld	W	D	L	GF	GA	GD	Pts	SAL	ICA	SCZ	TRZ
1	(Pernambuco) Salgueiro	6	3	3	0	10	5	+5	12		2–2	3–1	1–0
2	(Ceará) Icasa	6	3	2	1	7	4	+3	11	1–1		0–1	2–0
3	(Rio Grande do Norte) Santa Cruz	6	2	1	3	5	8	−3	7	0–2	0–1		1–0
4	(Paraíba) Treze	6	0	2	4	3	8	−5	2	1–1	0–1	2–2	

==== Group 7 (AL-BA-PE-SE) ====
Pos	Team	Pld	W	D	L	GF	GA	GD	Pts	ASA	CON	ATL	PET
1	(Alagoas) ASA	6	4	1	1	14	6	+8	13		6–0	2–0	1–0
2	(Sergipe) Confiança	6	4	0	2	12	10	+2	12	4–1		2–0	3–0
3	(Bahia) Atlético de Alagoinhas	6	2	1	3	6	8	−2	7	0–0	2–1		4–2
4	(Pernambuco) Petrolina	6	1	0	5	6	14	−8	3	2–4	1–2	1–0	

==== Group 8 (AL-BA-SE) ====
Pos	Team	Pld	W	D	L	GF	GA	GD	Pts	VCQ	ITA	SER	CSA
1	(Bahia) Vitória da Conquista	6	4	1	1	12	7	+5	13		2–1	3–1	2–0
2	(Bahia) Itabuna	6	3	0	3	8	7	+1	9	2–0		2–1	2–1
3	Sergipe	6	3	1	2	9	9	0	4 (Note: Sergipe lost 6 points for fielding an ineligible player.)	2–2	2–1		1–0
4	(Alagoas) CSA	6	1	0	5	4	10	−6	3	1–3	1–0	1–2	

==== Group 9 (GO-MT-MS) ====
Pos	Team	Pld	W	D	L	GF	GA	GD	Pts	AGO	MIX	OPE	AGN
1	(Goiás) Atlético Goianiense	6	4	2	0	15	5	+10	14		3–2	3–0	2–0
2	(Mato Grosso) Mixto	6	2	3	1	11	8	+3	9	2–2		1–1	3–2
3	(Mato Grosso do Sul) Operário (MS)	6	1	4	1	3	5	−2	7	0–0	0–0		1–0
4	(Mato Grosso do Sul) Águia Negra	6	0	1	5	4	15	−11	1	1–5	0–3	1–1	

==== Group 10 (DF-GO) ====
Pos	Team	Pld	W	D	L	GF	GA	GD	Pts	DPE	ITU	ANA	LEG
1	(Federal District (Brazil)) Dom Pedro II	6	2	3	1	8	7	+1	9		0–0	1–1	2–1
2	(Goiás) Itumbiara	6	2	2	2	6	4	+2	8	0–1		3–0	2–1
3	(Goiás) Anápolis	6	2	2	2	7	11	−4	8	2–2	1–0		2–0
4	(Federal District (Brazil)) Legião	6	2	1	3	11	10	+1	7	4–2	1–1	5–1	

==== Group 11 (ES-MG-RJ-SP) ====
Pos	Team	Pld	W	D	L	GF	GA	GD	Pts	AME	DCA	PTA	SER
1	(Minas Gerais) América	6	3	2	1	7	3	+4	11		2–0	1–0	2–0
2	(Rio de Janeiro (state)) Duque de Caxias	6	2	2	2	8	8	0	8	2–2		2–1	4–1
3	(São Paulo (state)) Paulista	6	2	2	2	6	6	0	8	0–0	0–0		3–2
4	(Espírito Santo) Serra	6	2	0	4	7	11	−4	6	1–0	2–0	1–2	

==== Group 12 (ES-RJ-SP) ====
Pos	Team	Pld	W	D	L	GF	GA	GD	Pts	GUA	BOA	MAC	LIN
1	(São Paulo (state)) Guaratinguetá	6	4	1	1	7	3	+4	13		1–0	0–1	2–1
2	(Rio de Janeiro (state)) Boavista	6	3	1	2	13	4	+9	10	1–3		2–0	6–0
3	(Rio de Janeiro (state)) Macaé	6	2	3	1	6	4	+2	9	0–0	0–0		3–0
4	(Espírito Santo) Linhares	6	0	1	5	3	18	−15	1	0–1	0–4	2–2	

==== Group 13 (MG-SP) ====
Pos	Team	Pld	W	D	L	GF	GA	GD	Pts	ITU	NOR	TUP	MIR
1	(Minas Gerais) Ituiutaba	6	4	2	0	8	3	+5	14		4–1	1–0	2–1
2	(São Paulo (state)) Noroeste	6	2	2	2	8	6	+2	8	1–1		2–0	2–0
3	(Minas Gerais) Tupi	6	2	1	3	6	9	−3	7	1–1	2–1		2–1
4	(São Paulo (state)) Mirassol	6	1	1	4	7	11	−4	4	0–2	2–2	3–1	

==== Group 14 (RJ-SP) ====
Pos	Team	Pld	W	D	L	GF	GA	GD	Pts	ITU	GUA	MAD	LIN
1	(São Paulo (state)) Ituano	6	3	1	2	10	8	+2	10		1–2	4–2	3–2
2	(São Paulo (state)) Guarani	6	3	1	2	5	4	+1	10	1–0		0–0	0–1
3	(Rio de Janeiro (state)) Madureira	6	2	1	3	8	9	−1	7	1–2	2–1		3–1
4	(São Paulo (state)) Linense	6	2	1	3	5	7	−2	7	0–0	0–1	1–0	

==== Group 15 (PR-RS-SC) ====
Pos	Team	Pld	W	D	L	GF	GA	GD	Pts	TOL	MCD	INT	ENB
1	(Paraná (state)) Toledo	6	2	3	1	8	6	+2	9		1–1 (Note: Matches replayed after Court decision as Toledo and Marcílio Dias players were accused of arranging a 0–0 draw on the last round of the group.)	2–1	2–0
2	(Santa Catarina (state)) Marcílio Dias	6	2	3	1	6	4	+2	9	1–1		1–1	2–0
3	(Rio Grande do Sul) Internacional (SM)	6	2	2	2	7	5	+2	8	1–1	1–0		3–0
4	(Paraná (state)) Engenheiro Beltrão	6	2	0	4	3	9	−6	6	2–1	0–1	1–0	

==== Group 16 (PR-RS-SC) ====
Pos	Team	Pld	W	D	L	GF	GA	GD	Pts	BRA	CAX	JMA	MET
1	(Rio Grande do Sul) Brasil	6	3	2	1	4	4	0	11		1–0	1–0	1–1
2	(Rio Grande do Sul) Caxias	6	2	2	2	8	4	+4	8	3–0		0–1	3–0
3	(Paraná (state)) J. Malucelli	6	1	4	1	4	4	0	7	0–0	1–1		1–1
4	(Santa Catarina (state)) Metropolitano	6	0	4	2	4	8	−4	4	0–1	1–1	1–1	

=== Second stage ===
==== Group 17 (AC-AM-MT-PA) ====
Pos	Team	Pld	W	D	L	GF	GA	GD	Pts	RBR	LUV	HOL	REM
1	(Acre (state)) Rio Branco	6	4	1	1	20	16	+4	13		4–3	4–2	3–0
2	(Mato Grosso) Luverdense	6	1	3	2	13	12	+1	6	5–2		1–1	1–2
3	(Amazonas (Brazilian state)) Holanda	6	1	3	2	10	12	−2	6	3–4	2–2		1–1
4	(Pará) Remo	6	1	3	2	7	10	−3	6	3–3	1–1	0–1	

==== Group 18 (MA-PA-PI) ====
Pos	Team	Pld	W	D	L	GF	GA	GD	Pts	AGU	PAY	SCO	PIC
1	(Pará) Águia de Marabá	6	3	1	2	13	8	+5	10		2–0	1–1	6–1
2	(Pará) Paysandu	6	3	1	2	8	8	0	10	3–2		2–0	2–0
3	(Maranhão) Sampaio Corrêa	6	2	2	2	6	6	0	8	1–2	1–1		2–0
4	(Piauí) Picos	6	2	0	4	6	11	−5	6	2–0	3–0	0–1	

==== Group 19 (CE-PB-PI) ====
Pos	Team	Pld	W	D	L	GF	GA	GD	Pts	SAL	CAM	ICA	SCR
1	(Pernambuco) Salgueiro	6	2	3	1	10	8	+2	9		2–1	3–1	2–2
2	(Paraíba) Campinense	6	2	3	1	6	4	+2	9	1–0		2–0	0–0
3	(Ceará) Icasa	6	2	2	2	5	7	−2	8	1–1	1–1		1–0
4	(Pernambuco) Santa Cruz	6	0	4	2	5	7	−2	4	2–2	1–1	0–1	

==== Group 20 (AL-BA-SE) ====
Pos	Team	Pld	W	D	L	GF	GA	GD	Pts	ASA	CON	VCQ	ITA
1	(Alagoas) ASA	6	3	1	2	11	7	+4	10		1–0	3–0	5–0
2	(Sergipe) Confiança	6	3	1	2	11	8	+3	10	2–0		3–3	4–2
3	(Bahia) Vitória da Conquista	6	2	1	3	11	11	0	7	3–0	2–0		2–3
4	(Bahia) Itabuna	6	2	1	3	9	16	−7	7	2–2	0–2	2–1	

==== Group 21 (DF-GO-MT) ====
Pos	Team	Pld	W	D	L	GF	GA	GD	Pts	AGO	MIX	DPE	ITU
1	(Goiás) Atlético Goianiense	6	5	0	1	22	9	+13	15		2–1	6–4	7–1
2	(Mato Grosso) Mixto	6	2	1	3	7	8	−1	7	2–1		1–1	2–1
3	(Federal District (Brazil)) Dom Pedro II	6	2	1	3	9	12	−3	7	0–2	1–0		1–0
4	(Goiás) Itumbiara	6	2	0	4	8	17	−9	6	1–4	2–1	3–2	

==== Group 22 (MG-RJ-SP) ====
Pos	Team	Pld	W	D	L	GF	GA	GD	Pts	GUA	DCA	AME	BOA
1	(São Paulo (state)) Guaratinguetá	6	4	1	1	9	4	+5	13		1–0	2–1	1–0
2	(Rio de Janeiro (state)) Duque de Caxias	6	4	0	2	8	7	+1	12	2–1		2–0	1–0
3	(Minas Gerais) América	6	2	1	3	6	5	+1	7	0–0	3–0		2–0
4	(Rio de Janeiro (state)) Boavista	6	1	0	5	4	11	−7	3	1–4	2–3	1–0	

==== Group 23 (MG-SP) ====
Pos	Team	Pld	W	D	L	GF	GA	GD	Pts	ITT	GUA	NOR	ITU
1	(Minas Gerais) Ituiutaba	6	4	2	0	8	2	+6	14		1–0	0–0	2–1
2	(São Paulo (state)) Guarani	6	3	1	2	6	5	+1	10	0–2		1–0	2–0
3	(São Paulo (state)) Noroeste	6	1	4	1	3	3	0	7	0–0	1–1		1–0
4	(São Paulo (state)) Ituano	6	0	1	5	4	11	−7	1	1–3	1–2	1–1	

==== Group 24 (PR-RS-SC) ====
Pos	Team	Pld	W	D	L	GF	GA	GD	Pts	MCD	BRA	CAX	TOL
1	(Santa Catarina (state)) Marcílio Dias	6	4	1	1	10	8	+2	13		2–1	2–1	2–1
2	(Rio Grande do Sul) Brasil	6	4	0	2	12	11	+1	12	3–1		2–1	2–1
3	(Rio Grande do Sul) Caxias	6	2	1	3	12	9	+3	7	1–2	5–1		2–0
4	(Paraná (state)) Toledo	6	0	2	4	6	12	−6	2	1–1	1–3	2–2	

=== Third stage ===
==== Group 25 (AC-MT-PA) ====
Pos	Team	Pld	W	D	L	GF	GA	GD	Pts	RBR	AGU	PAY	LUV
1	(Acre (state)) Rio Branco	6	4	1	1	9	3	+6	13		4–0	2–1	1–0
2	(Pará) Águia de Marabá	6	2	3	1	8	10	−2	9	0–0		3–2	1–1
3	(Pará) Paysandu	6	2	2	2	9	8	+1	8	2–1	1–1		3–1
4	(Mato Grosso) Luverdense	6	0	2	4	4	9	−5	2	0–1	2–3	0–0	

==== Group 26 (AL-PB-PE-SE) ====
Pos	Team	Pld	W	D	L	GF	GA	GD	Pts	CON	CAM	ASA	SAL
1	(Sergipe) Confiança	6	3	2	1	8	5	+3	11		1–0	3–1	2–2
2	(Paraíba) Campinense	6	3	1	2	7	8	−1	10	1–0		1–5	1–1
3	(Alagoas) ASA	6	2	2	2	8	6	+2	8	1–1	0–1		1–0
4	(Pernambuco) Salgueiro	6	0	3	3	4	8	−4	3	0–1	1–3	0–0	

==== Group 27 (GO-MT-RJ-SP) ====
Pos	Team	Pld	W	D	L	GF	GA	GD	Pts	AGO	DCA	GUA	MIX
1	(Goiás) Atlético Goianiense	6	3	1	2	12	6	+6	10		3–0	2–0	4–1
2	(Rio de Janeiro (state)) Duque de Caxias	6	3	1	2	12	8	+4	10	3–2		1–1	3–1
3	(São Paulo (state)) Guaratinguetá	6	3	1	2	10	6	+4	10	1–0	1–0		5–0
4	(Mato Grosso) Mixto	6	1	1	4	6	20	−14	4	1–1	0–5	3–2	

==== Group 28 (MG-RS-SC-SP) ====
Pos	Team	Pld	W	D	L	GF	GA	GD	Pts	GUA	BRA	ITU	MCD
1	(São Paulo (state)) Guarani	6	3	3	0	11	4	+7	12		0–0	2–0	5–1
2	(Rio Grande do Sul) Brasil	6	2	3	1	10	8	+2	9	1–1		4–2	1–1
3	(Minas Gerais) Ituiutaba	6	2	0	4	7	12	−5	6	1–2	3–2		1–0
4	(Santa Catarina (state)) Marcílio Dias	6	1	2	3	6	10	−4	5	1–1	1–2	2–0	

=== Final stage (AC-GO-PA-PB-RJ-RS-SP-SE) ===
Pos	Team	Pld	W	D	L	GF	GA	GD	Pts	AGO	GUA	CAM	DCA	AGU	BRA	CON	RBR
1	(Goiás) Atlético Goianiense (P)	14	9	2	3	35	10	+25	29		2–0	0–0	5–1	4–0	2–0	6–0	5–0
2	(São Paulo (state)) Guarani (P)	14	6	3	5	25	22	+3	21	0–3		1–1	4–2	2–1	1–0	5–1	3–1
3	(Paraíba) Campinense (P)	14	5	6	3	19	20	−1	21	2–1	0–0		3–1	2–2	2–1	2–1	3–0
4	(Rio de Janeiro (state)) Duque de Caxias (P)	14	5	3	6	27	31	−4	18	2–2	2–4	2–2		1–0	4–1	3–1	4–1
5	(Pará) Águia de Marabá	14	5	3	6	20	24	−4	18	2–1	2–1	1–1	1–2		2–1	2–2	1–0
6	(Rio Grande do Sul) Brasil	14	5	2	7	17	21	−4	17	1–0	1–1	4–0	1–1	2–1		2–0	2–1
7	(Sergipe) Confiança	14	5	2	7	23	33	−10	17	1–2	2–1	4–0	3–2	3–2	2–0		2–2
8	(Acre (state)) Rio Branco	14	5	1	8	25	30	−5	16	1–2	4–2	2–1	3–0 (Note: Match was concluded on the 83rd minute after Duque de Caxias had only six players – three were sent off and two left the field claiming injury. On October 24, Court said that Duque de Caxias withdrew, concluding that the players pretended their injuries to force the conclusion of the game in a 2–2 draw. On October 28, Court decided that the match result was a 3–0 win by Rio Branco, awarding them three points.)	2–3	4–1	4–1	

(P) Promoted to Série B 2009

== Qualification to Série C 2009 ==
In 2009, Série C will have a new format and the number of teams will be reduced from 64 to only 20 clubs. Teams finished from 5th to 20th are qualified to next season, meanwhile the ones finished from the 21st-place will have to qualify via state competitions to play Série D in 2009.

Pos	Team	Pld	W	D	L	GF	GA	GD	Pts	Qualification
1	(Goiás) Atlético Goianiense	14	9	2	3	35	10	+25	29	Série B 2009
2	(São Paulo (state)) Guarani	14	6	3	5	25	22	+3	21	Série B 2009
3	(Paraíba) Campinense	14	5	6	3	19	20	−1	21	Série B 2009
4	(Rio de Janeiro (state)) Duque de Caxias	14	5	3	6	27	31	−4	18	Série B 2009
5	(Pará) Águia de Marabá	14	5	3	6	20	24	−4	18	Série C 2009
6	(Rio Grande do Sul) Brasil	14	5	2	7	17	21	−4	17	Série C 2009
7	(Sergipe) Confiança	14	5	2	7	23	33	−10	17	Série C 2009
8	(Acre (state)) Rio Branco	14	5	1	8	25	30	−5	16	Série C 2009
9	(São Paulo (state)) Guaratinguetá	6	3	1	2	10	6	+4	10	Série C 2009
10	(Alagoas) ASA	6	2	2	2	8	6	+2	8	Série C 2009
11	(Pará) Paysandu	6	2	2	2	9	8	+1	8	Série C 2009
12	(Minas Gerais) Ituiutaba	6	2	0	4	7	12	−5	6	Série C 2009
13	(Santa Catarina (state)) Marcílio Dias	6	1	2	3	6	10	−4	5	Série C 2009
14	(Mato Grosso) Mixto	6	1	1	4	6	20	−14	4	Série C 2009
15	(Pernambuco) Salgueiro	6	0	3	3	4	8	−4	3	Série C 2009
16	(Mato Grosso) Luverdense	6	0	2	4	4	9	−5	2	Série C 2009
17	(Maranhão) Sampaio Corrêa	6	2	2	2	6	6	0	8	Série C 2009
18	(Ceará) Icasa	6	2	2	2	5	7	−2	8	Série C 2009
19	(Rio Grande do Sul) Caxias	6	2	1	3	12	9	+3	7	Série C 2009
20	(Minas Gerais) América Mineiro	6	2	1	3	6	5	+1	7	Série C 2009
21	(Bahia) Vitória da Conquista	6	2	1	3	11	11	0	7	
22	(Federal District (Brazil)) Dom Pedro II	6	2	1	3	9	12	−3	7	
23	(São Paulo (state)) Noroeste	6	1	4	1	3	3	0	7	
24	(Amazonas (Brazilian state)) Holanda	6	1	3	2	10	12	−2	6	

== See also ==
- Série A 2008
- Série B 2008
- Copa do Brasil 2008
