= Luverdense Esporte Clube =

Brazilian football club

Luverdense
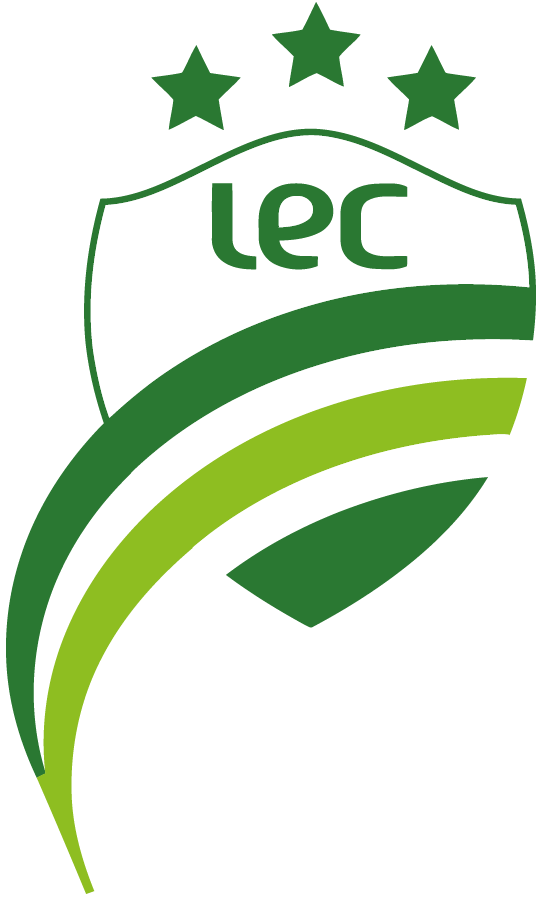
- Full name: Luverdense Esporte Clube
- Nicknames: Verdão do Norte ((Big Green of North); LEC
- Founded: 24 January 2004; 22 years ago
- Ground: Estádio Passo das Emas
- Capacity: 10,000
- President: Aluízio Bassani
- Head coach: Wagner Lopes
- League: Campeonato Brasileiro Série D Campeonato Mato-Grossense
- 2025 2025: Série D, 21st of 64; Mato-Grossense, 7th of 10
- Website: luverdense.com.br
Home colors	Away colors

Luverdense Esporte Clube, commonly referred to as Luverdense, is a Brazilian professional club based in Lucas do Rio Verde, Mato Grosso founded on 24 January 2004. It competes in the Campeonato Mato-Grossense, the top flight of the Mato Grosso state football league, and the Campeonato Brasileiro Série D.

== History ==
The club was founded on 24 January 2004, by entrepreneurs and farmers. The club name, Luverdense, refers to the used to refer to people born in Lucas do Rio Verde city.

The club won the Copa Governador do Mato Grosso in 2004, in 2007 and in 2011. As the club won the 2007 edition, the club qualified to the 2008 Série C. Luverdense won the Campeonato Mato-Grossense for the first time on May 17, 2009, after beating Araguaia in the final.

The club was eliminated in the First Stage in the 2005 Série C, in the Third Stage in 2008, in the First Stage in 2009, in the First Stage in the 2010 and in the First Stage in 2011.

== Rivalries ==
=== Sorriso ===
Luverdense’s Biggest Rivals is Sorriso.

== Honours ==
=== Official tournaments ===
Regional
Competitions	Titles	Seasons
Copa Verde	1	2017
State
Competitions	Titles	Seasons
Campeonato Mato-Grossense	3	2009, 2012, 2016
Copa FMF	4	2004, 2007, 2011, 2019

- record

=== Runners-up ===
- Campeonato Mato-Grossense (2): 2014, 2026
