= Atlético Progresso Clube =

Progresso
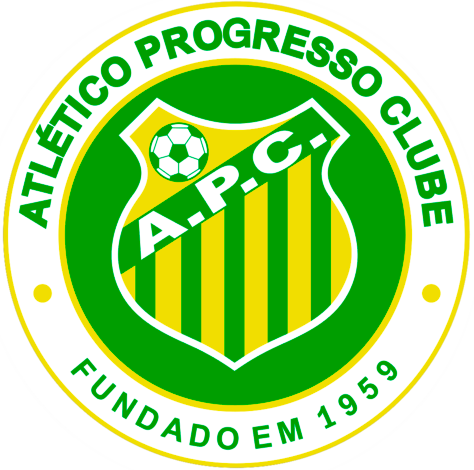
- Full name: Atlético Progresso Clube
- Nickname: Verdão
- Founded: July 21, 1959
- Ground: Canarinho, Boa Vista, Roraima, Roraima state, Brazil
- Capacity: 6,000
Home colours	Away colours

Atlético Progresso Clube, commonly known as Progresso, is a Brazilian football club based in Mucajaí, Roraima state. They competed in the Série C three times.

== History ==
The club was founded on July 21, 1959. They competed in the Série C for the first time in 1995, then again in 1997 and in 2008. The club was eliminated in the First Stage in all the three editions.

== Honours ==
- Campeonato Roraimense
  - Runners-up (1): 2008

== Stadium ==
Atlético Progresso Clube play their home games at Estádio Flamarion Vasconcelos, nicknamed Canarinho, located in Boa Vista. The stadium has a maximum capacity of 6,000 people.
