= 2009 Campeonato Brasileiro Série C =

Campeonato Brasileiro Série C
- Season: 2009
- Champions: América Mineiro (1st title)
- Runner up: ASA
- Promoted: América Mineiro; ASA; Icasa; Guaratinguetá
- Relegated: Sampaio Corrêa; Confiança; Mixto; Marcílio Dias
- Goals: 264
- Average goals/game: 2.81
- Biggest home win: Icasa 6−2 Paysandu, Quarterfinals 2nd leg, Aug 16
- Biggest away win: Criciúma 1−4 Marcílio Dias, 1st Stage 4th Round, Jun 20
- Highest scoring: 8 goals − Icasa 6−2 Paysandu, Quarterfinals 2nd leg, Aug 16
- Highest attendance: 24,816 − Caxias 1−1 Guaratinguetá, Quarterfinals 2nd leg, Aug 16
- Lowest attendance: 263 − Confiança 0−2 Icasa, 1st Stage 1st Round, May 24
- Average attendance: 4,174

In 2009, the Campeonato Brasileiro Série C, the third level of the Brazilian League, was contested by 20 clubs from May 24 to September 19, 2009. In an attempt to increase profits and interest on the competition, CBF decided to reduce the number of participating teams from 64 to 20 this season and establish regular membership, akin to Série A and Série B.

In the finals, América Mineiro, a traditional club from the city of Belo Horizonte, defeated ASA after winning away and at home. Top four clubes, the ones which qualified to the quarterfinals, ascended to the Campeonato Brasileiro Série B to be contested in 2010: América Mineiro, ASA, Icasa and Guaratinguetá. Meanwhile, the bottom four clubs, the ones that finished in last place of each group, were relegated to Série D next season: Sampaio Corrêa, Confiança, Mixto and Marcílio Dias.

== Team information ==
Team	City	State	Stadium	Capacity	2008 season
Águia de Marabá	Marabá	(Pará) PA	Zinho de Oliveira	2,000	Série C 5th place
América Mineiro	Belo Horizonte	(Minas Gerais) MG	Independência	18,000	Série C 20th place
ASA	Arapiraca	(Alagoas) AL	Coaracy da Mata Fonseca	10,000	Série C 10th place
Brasil	Pelotas	(Rio Grande do Sul) RS	Bento Freitas	18,000	Série C 6th place
Caxias	Caxias do Sul	(Rio Grande do Sul) RS	Centenário	30,822	Série C 19th place
Confiança	Aracaju	(Sergipe) SE	Batistão	22,000	Série C 7th place
CRB	Maceió	(Alagoas) AL	Rei Pelé	30,000	Série B 20th place
Criciúma	Criciúma	(Santa Catarina (state)) SC	Heriberto Hülse	28,749	Série B 18th place
Gama	Gama	(Federal District (Brazil)) DF	Bezerrão	20,000	Série B 19th place
Guaratinguetá	Guaratinguetá	(São Paulo (state)) SP	Dario Rodrigues Leite	14,415	Série C 9th place
Icasa	Juazeiro do Norte	(Ceará) CE	Romeirão	20,000	Série C 18th place
Ituiutaba	Ituiutaba	(Minas Gerais) MG	Fazendinha	5,000	Série C 12th place
Marcílio Dias	Itajaí	(Santa Catarina (state)) SC	Hercílio Luz	12,000	Série C 13th place
Luverdense	Lucas do Rio Verde	(Mato Grosso) MT	Paço das Emas	6,500	Série C 16th place
Marília	Marília	(São Paulo (state)) SP	Bento de Abreu	17,500	Série B 17th place
Mixto	Cuiabá	(Mato Grosso) MT	Verdão	47,000	Série C 14th place
Paysandu	Belém	(Pará) PA	Estádio Olímpico do Pará	45,000	Série C 11th place
Rio Branco	Rio Branco	(Acre (state)) AC	Arena da Floresta	20,000	Série C 8th place
Salgueiro	Salgueiro	(Pernambuco) PE	Cornélio de Barros	6,000	Série C 15th place
Sampaio Corrêa	São Luís	(Maranhão) MA	Castelão	70,000	Série C 17th place

== Format ==
- First Stage: The 20 teams are divided in four groups of 5, playing within them in a double round-robin format. The two best ranked in each group advance towards next stage. The last placed team in each group is relegated to Série D 2010
- Quarterfinals: Eight qualified teams play in two-leg format, home and away. Winners qualify to semifinals and are promoted to Série B 2010.
- Semifinals: Quarterfinals winners play in two-leg format, home and away. Winners qualify to the Finals.
- Finals: Semifinals winners play in two-leg format, home and away. Winners are declared champions.

== Results ==
=== First stage ===
==== Group A (AC-MA-MT-PA) ====
Team	Pld	W	D	L	GF	GA	GD	Pts	RBR	PAY	AGU	LUV	SCR
(Acre (state)) Rio Branco	8	4	0	4	15	12	+3	12		4–0	2–1	3–0	3–1
(Pará) Paysandu	8	3	3	2	11	12	−1	12	3–1		2–1	1–1	1–0
(Pará) Águia de Marabá	8	3	2	3	12	12	0	11	1–0	2–2		0–2	2–2
(Mato Grosso) Luverdense	8	3	2	3	8	9	−1	11	2–0	3–2	0–2		0–0
(Maranhão) Sampaio Corrêa	8	2	3	3	10	11	−1	9	4–2	0–0	2–3	1–0	

==== Group B (AL-CE-PE-SE) ====
Team	Pld	W	D	L	GF	GA	GD	Pts	ICA	ASA	SAL	CRB	CON
(Ceará) Icasa	8	5	2	1	15	4	+11	17		0–0	3–0	2–0	4–0
(Alagoas) ASA	8	5	1	2	13	7	+6	16	2–1		3–0	2–1	5–2
(Pernambuco) Salgueiro	8	4	1	3	8	12	−4	13	1–1	1–0		1–0	2–1
(Alagoas) CRB	8	2	0	6	8	12	−4	6	1–2	0–1	3–1		2–1
(Sergipe) Confiança	8	2	0	6	9	18	−9	6	0–2	2–0	1–2	2–1	

==== Group C (DF-MT-MG-SP) ====
Team	Pld	W	D	L	GF	GA	GD	Pts	AME	GUA	ITU	GAM	MIX
(Minas Gerais) América Mineiro	8	5	1	2	12	6	+6	16		2–0	2–1	2–0	5–1
(São Paulo (state)) Guaratinguetá	8	5	0	3	15	12	+3	15	2–0		2–1	5–2	4–1
(Minas Gerais) Ituiutaba	8	3	2	3	13	8	+5	11	0–0	3–0		2–1	5–0
(Federal District (Brazil)) Gama	8	2	2	4	11	14	−3	8	2–0	1–2	1–1		2–0
(Mato Grosso) Mixto	8	2	1	5	8	19	−11	7	0–1	2–0	2–0	2–2	

==== Group D (RS-SC-SP) ====
Team	Pld	W	D	L	GF	GA	GD	Pts	CAX	BRA	MAR	CRI	MCD
(Rio Grande do Sul) Caxias	8	5	1	2	10	6	+4	16		1–0	1–1	1–0	4–1
(Rio Grande do Sul) Brasil	8	5	1	2	12	9	+3	16	1–0		2–1	1–0	2–1
(São Paulo (state)) Marília	8	4	3	1	14	8	+6	15	2–0	1–1		2–0	3–2
(Santa Catarina (state)) Criciúma	8	2	1	5	6	12	−6	7	0–1	3–2	1–1		1–4
(Santa Catarina (state)) Marcílio Dias	8	1	0	7	12	19	−7	3	1–2	2–3	1–3	0–1	

=== Knockout stages ===
Quarterfinals
1A	Rio Branco*	1	2
2B	ASA (a)	1	2
1B	Icasa*	1	6
2A	Paysandu	1	2
1C	América Mineiro*	0	3
2D	Brasil	0	1
1D	Caxias*	0	1
2C	Guaratinguetá	2	1

Semifinals
ASA	1	3
Icasa*	1	2
América Mineiro* (p)	1	2
Guaratinguetá	2	1

Finals
ASA	1	0
América Mineiro*	3	1

* plays second leg at home.
(p) won on penalty shootout.
(a) won by away goals rule.

==== Quarterfinals ====
First leg played on August 9; Second leg played on August 16.

Team 1	Agg.	Team 2	1st leg	2nd leg
Rio Branco	3−3 (a)	ASA	1−1	2−2
Icasa	7−3	Paysandu	1−1	6−2
América Mineiro	3−1	Brasil	0–0	3–1
Caxias	1−3	Guaratinguetá	0–2	1–1

Team #1 played second match at home.

==== Semifinals ====
First leg played on August 23; Second leg played on August 30.

Team 1	Agg.	Team 2	1st leg	2nd leg
Icasa	3−4	ASA	1−1	2−3
América Mineiro	3−3 (7−6 p)	Guaratinguetá	1–2	2–1

Team #1 played second match at home.

==== Finals ====
First leg played on September 13; Second leg played on September 19.

Team 1	Agg.	Team 2	1st leg	2nd leg
América Mineiro	4−1	ASA	3−1	1−0

Team #1 played second match at home.

Campeonato Brasileiro Série C 2009 winners

1st title
