= 2010 Campeonato Brasileiro Série B =

Campeonato Brasileiro Série B
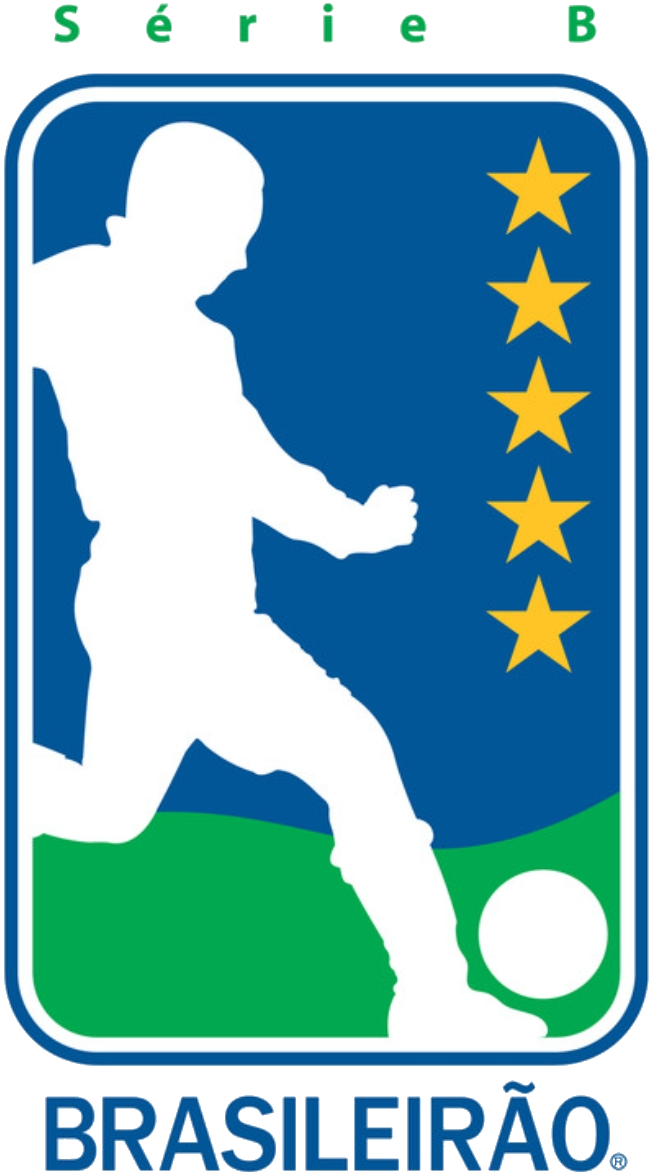
- Season: 2010
- Champions: Coritiba (2nd title)
- Promoted: Coritiba; Figueirense; Bahia; América (MG)
- Relegated: Santo André; Ipatinga; Brasiliense; América (RN)
- Matches: 380
- Goals: 1,047 (2.76 per match)
- Top goalscorer: 21 goals: Alessandro
- Biggest home win: Figueirense 6-0 ASA (June 01, 2010)
- Biggest away win: América (RN) 0-5 Sport Recife (June 05, 2010)
- Highest scoring: 7 goals: Santo André 3–4 Portuguesa (May 25, 2010); ASA 6-1 Brasiliense (July 16, 2010); Portuguesa 6-1 Paraná (October 01, 2010)
- Longest winning run: 6 games: Ponte Preta (July 31–August 27); Vila Nova (August 28-September 21)
- Longest unbeaten run: 12 games: Sport Recife (August 07-September 25)
- Longest losing run: 6 games: Duque de Caxias (May 08–June 04); Vila Nova (May 21–July 17)
- Highest attendance: 32,157: Bahia 2–0 Sport Recife (May 29, 2010); Bahia 1–1 Coritiba (November 02, 2010); Bahia 3–0 Portuguesa (November 13, 2010)
- Lowest attendance: 32: Duque de Caxias 0–1 América (RN) (June 01, 2010)
- Average attendance: 5,131

In 2010, the Campeonato Brasileiro Série B, the second level of the Brazilian League, was contested by 20 clubs from May 7 to November 27, 2010. The top four teams in the table, former Brazilian Série A champions Coritiba and Bahia alongside Figueirense and América (MG), were promoted to the Campeonato Brasileiro Série A to be contested in 2011, meanwhile the bottom four were relegated to Série C next season. Three former Brazilian champion played in this edition: Bahia and 2009 relegated Coritiba and Sport Recife. Playing for the first time were Guaratinguetá, which was promoted along with ASA de Arapiraca, Icasa and América Mineiro from the Série C. After spending a single season in Série A, Santo André returned to Série B along with Náutico.

== Format ==
For the fifth consecutive season, the tournament was played in a double round-robin system. The team with most points has been declared champions. The top four clubs ascended to Série A, meanwhile the bottom four were relegated to Série C.

== Team information ==
Team	City	State	Stadium	Capacity	2009 season
América Mineiro	Belo Horizonte	(Minas Gerais) MG	Independência	18,000	Série C 1st place (promoted)
América de Natal	Natal	(Rio Grande do Norte) RN	Machadão	35,000	Série B 16th place
ASA de Arapiraca	Arapiraca	(Alagoas) AL	Coaracy da Mata Fonseca	10,000	Série C 2nd place (promoted)
Bahia	Salvador	(Bahia) BA	Pituaçu	32,157	Série B 12th place
Bragantino	Bragança Paulista	(São Paulo (state)) SP	Nabi Abi Chedid	21,209	Série B 9th place
Brasiliense	Taguatinga	(Federal District (Brazil)) DF	Boca do Jacaré	32,000	Série B 14th place
Coritiba	Curitiba	(Paraná (state)) PR	Couto Pereira	37,182	Série A 17th place (relegated)
Duque de Caxias	Duque de Caxias	(Rio de Janeiro (state)) RJ	Marrentão	10,000	Série B 8th place
Figueirense	Florianópolis	(Santa Catarina (state)) SC	Orlando Scarpelli	19,808	Série B 6th place
Guaratinguetá	Guaratinguetá	(São Paulo (state)) SP	Dario Rodrigues Leite	14,415	Série C 3rd place (promoted)
Icasa	Juazeiro do Norte	(Ceará) CE	Romeirão	20,000	Série C 4th place (promoted)
Ipatinga	Ipatinga	(Minas Gerais) MG	Ipatingão	15,000	Série B 15th place
Náutico	Recife	(Pernambuco) PE	Aflitos	30,000	Série A 19th place (relegated)
Paraná	Curitiba	(Paraná (state)) PR	Vila Capanema	20,000	Série B 10th place
Ponte Preta	Campinas	(São Paulo (state)) SP	Moisés Lucarelli	19,722	Série B 11th place
Portuguesa	São Paulo	(São Paulo (state)) SP	Canindé	25,470	Série B 5th place
Santo André	Santo André	(São Paulo (state)) SP	Bruno José Daniel	18,000	Série A 18th place (relegated)
São Caetano	São Caetano do Sul	(São Paulo (state)) SP	Anacleto Campanella	22,738	Série B 7th place
Sport Recife	Recife	(Pernambuco) PE	Ilha do Retino	35,000	Série A 20th place (relegated)
Vila Nova	Goiânia	(Goiás) GO	Serra Dourada	54,084	Série B 13th place

== Standings ==
Pos	Team	Pld	W	D	L	GF	GA	GD	Pts	Promotion or relegation
1	Coritiba (C, P)	38	21	8	9	69	49	+20	71	Promotion to Campeonato Brasileiro
2	Figueirense (P)	38	19	10	9	68	37	+31	67	Promotion to Campeonato Brasileiro
3	Bahia (P)	38	19	8	11	63	44	+19	65	Promotion to Campeonato Brasileiro
4	América Mineiro (P)	38	19	6	13	56	42	+14	63	Promotion to Campeonato Brasileiro
5	Portuguesa	38	19	5	14	69	52	+17	62	
6	Sport Recife	38	15	11	12	54	42	+12	56	
7	Paraná	38	15	8	15	47	44	+3	53	
8	Bragantino	38	13	14	11	52	37	+15	53	
9	ASA	38	16	4	18	52	56	−4	52	
10	São Caetano	38	14	10	14	50	52	−2	52	
11	Duque de Caxias	38	15	5	18	46	56	−10	50	
12	Icasa	38	13	10	15	53	51	+2	49	
13	Náutico	38	14	6	18	41	60	−19	48	
14	Ponte Preta	38	12	12	14	49	48	+1	48	
15	Guaratinguetá	38	11	14	13	47	59	−12	47	
16	Vila Nova	38	13	7	18	50	69	−19	46	
17	Brasiliense (R)	38	12	10	16	41	59	−18	46	Relegation to Série C
18	Santo André (R)	38	11	10	17	53	61	−8	43	Relegation to Série C
19	Ipatinga (R)	38	11	8	19	47	62	−15	41	Relegation to Série C
20	América de Natal (R)	38	11	8	19	40	68	−28	41	Relegation to Série C

Updated to match(es) played on November 27, 2010. Source: CBF (in Portuguese)
Rules for classification: 1st points; 2nd wins; 3rd goal difference; 4th goals scored; 5th head-to-head results; 6th least red cards received; 7th least yellow cards received; 8th draw
(C) Champions; (P) Promoted; (R) Relegated

2010 Campeonato Brasileiro Série B winners
Coritiba
2nd title

== Results ==
Home \ Away	AMG	ARN	ASA	BAH	BRG	BRS	CTB	DUQ	FIG	GTG	ICA	IPA	NAU	PAR	PON	POR	STA	SCA	SPT	VIL
América Mineiro		4–1	1–3	0–1	0–0	2–1	1–1	2–1	1–0	3–1	2–0	4–0	1–2	1–0	1–3	2–3	4–1	2–0	2–1	2–0
América de Natal	0–2		1–0	0–2	0–0	1–2	1–2	2–1	1–3	5–2	2–0	0–1	2–1	1–0	1–1	1–3	2–0	3–3	0–5	1–2
ASA	2–1	1–2		0–1	2–0	6–1	1–2	0–2	1–2	1–2	3–0	2–1	2–0	0–1	1–1	1–1	2–0	3–1	4–1	2–1
Bahia	3–0	1–0	5–1		1–1	1–1	1–1	0–1	2–2	2–1	2–4	3–1	3–0	2–1	1–1	3–0	1–2	3–0	2–0	1–1
Bragantino	1–2	5–0	2–1	2–0		2–2	2–3	4–1	0–2	1–1	0–0	2–0	3–0	1–0	0–2	2–0	3–1	1–1	0–0	5–1
Brasiliense	1–1	1–0	2–3	3–2	0–4		0–1	2–0	1–1	2–2	2–0	1–0	0–1	3–0	2–1	1–1	1–0	1–1	2–1	3–0
Coritiba	1–1	5–1	2–0	2–0	0–0	2–1		0–2	2–1	2–3	3–0	3–0	3–1	0–0	2–1	2–0	3–2	1–2	2–1	5–1
Duque de Caxias	1–0	0–1	1–1	0–0	2–1	3–0	2–3		2–2	1–2	1–0	1–1	1–2	1–5	3–2	3–2	3–2	1–0	1–3	1–0
Figueirense	0–1	4–0	6–0	1–0	0–0	1–0	2–0	0–0		2–2	5–1	5–0	1–2	4–2	4–2	2–1	2–2	1–0	0–0	2–0
Guaratinguetá	1–3	1–1	0–2	4–2	2–2	0–1	1–0	3–1	2–2		1–1	2–1	1–0	0–2	2–3	1–1	3–1	0–0	0–1	2–1
Icasa	2–3	2–2	0–1	4–0	2–1	3–0	2–2	3–1	3–1	0–0		2–0	3–1	3–0	2–0	3–1	1–2	1–1	0–0	1–4
Ipatinga	1–2	1–1	1–2	1–2	2–1	3–1	5–1	2–0	0–2	3–0	2–2		2–1	1–2	2–1	0–0	1–1	4–1	1–3	2–0
Náutico	2–1	2–2	2–1	3–2	1–1	0–0	3–1	0–2	1–1	0–1	1–0	2–0		1–4	1–1	1–0	1–0	1–2	1–1	4–1
Paraná	1–0	0–1	2–1	0–1	0–0	2–0	0–1	1–0	1–1	1–1	0–0	3–0	4–0		2–2	2–1	3–0	1–0	0–2	1–0
Ponte Preta	0–0	3–0	0–0	1–2	0–1	2–0	2–2	1–0	1–2	1–1	0–1	1–1	2–0	1–0		0–2	2–0	1–2	3–1	2–2
Portuguesa	1–0	1–2	2–0	2–4	2–0	3–1	2–2	0–2	1–0	3–0	3–1	2–1	3–1	6–1	0–1		3–2	3–1	1–2	4–1
Santo André	3–0	1–1	3–0	1–0	1–3	1–1	1–3	4–1	0–2	1–1	1–1	2–2	1–0	3–1	2–0	3–4		1–0	2–2	0–0
São Caetano	0–0	1–0	2–0	1–1	0–0	1–1	3–1	1–0	0–1	3–1	2–1	2–1	5–0	2–2	3–1	1–3	3–2		2–1	1–2
Sport Recife	1–0	3–0	2–0	1–2	2–0	3–0	3–2	1–2	2–1	1–1	1–2	0–1	1–1	1–0	1–1	1–2	1–1	4–1		0–0
Vila Nova	2–4	2–1	2–3	0–4	3–1	4–0	0–1	3–1	3–1	1–0	1–0	2–2	2–1	2–2	1–2	2–1	0–3	2–1	1–1	

Source: CBF (in Portuguese)
Legend: Blue = home team win; Yellow = draw; Red = away team win.

== Top goalscorers ==
Pos	Name	Club	Goals
1	(Brazil) Alessandro	Ipatinga	21
2	(Brazil) Fábio Júnior	América (MG)	19
3	(Brazil) Eduardo	São Caetano	17
4	(Brazil) Ciro	Sport Recife	16
5	(Brazil) Adriano	Bahia	15
5	(Brazil) Roni	Vila Nova	15
7	(Brazil) Ciel	ASA de Arapiraca	14
7	(Brazil) William	Ponte Preta	14
9	(Brazil) Somália	Duque de Caxias	13
10	(Brazil) Héverton	Portuguesa	12
10	(Brazil) Jael	Bahia	12
