= Derby Campineiro =

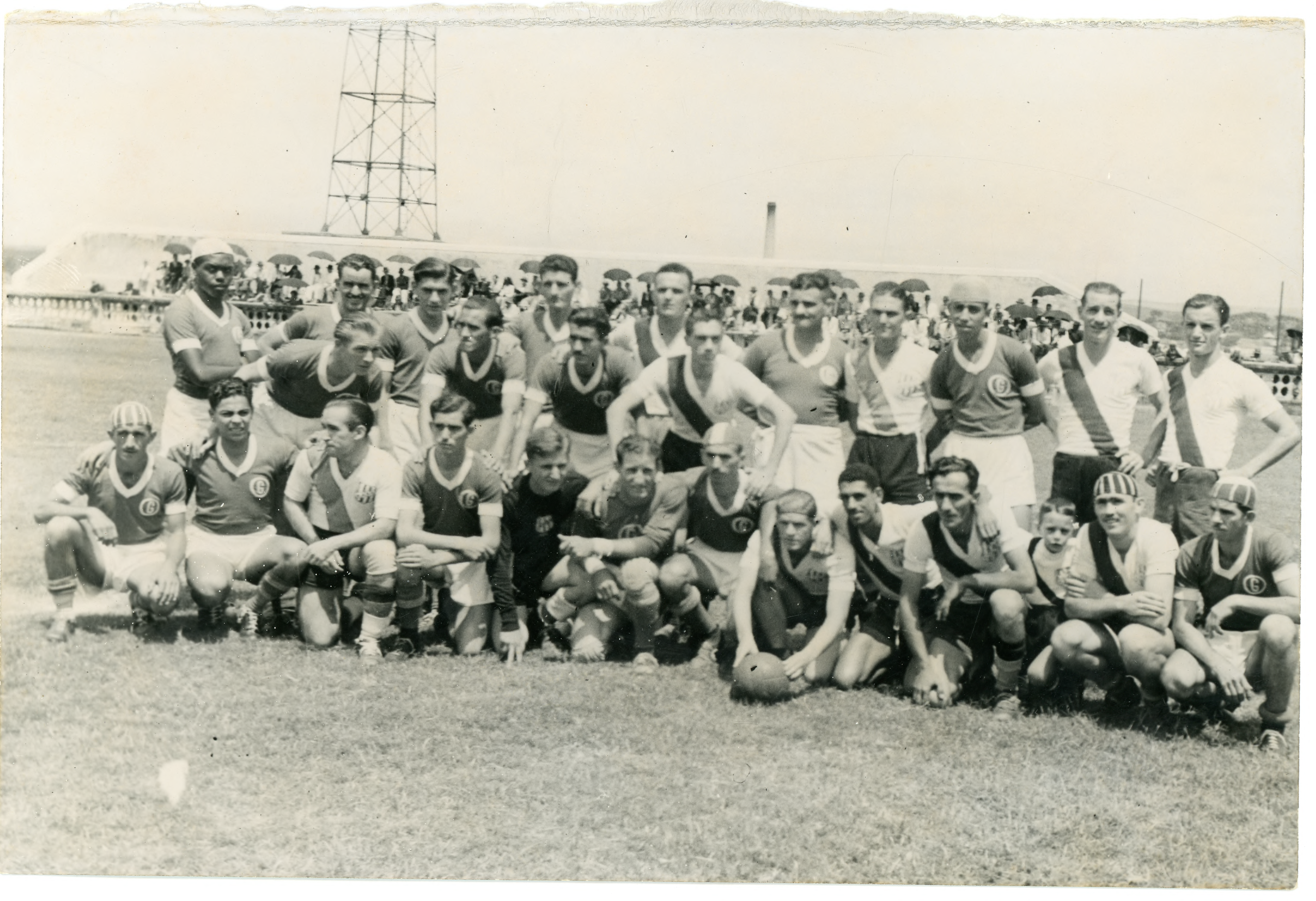

- Guarani Ponte Preta
- Other names: Dérbi Campineiro
- Location: Campinas, São Paulo, Brazil
- First meeting: 24 March 1912 (Unknown result)
- Latest meeting: 31 January 2026; Campeonato Paulista; Guarani 1–0 Ponte Preta
- Stadiums: Brinco de Ouro da Princesa (Guarani); Moisés Lucarelli (Ponte Preta)

Statistics
- Total meetings: 213
- Most wins: Guarani (72)
- Most player appearances: Bruninho, Ponte Preta (44 matches)
- Top scorer: Zuza, Guarani (17 goals)

Derby campineiro is the name given to the Guarani Futebol Clube and Associação Atlética Ponte Preta football rivalry, both clubs from Campinas, in the State of São Paulo. It is considered the biggest and fiercest derby of the interior of Brazil, and is also the oldest rivalry of the state. The main attribute of the fixture is its balanced statistics.

== History ==
The first derby of all time, on 24 March 1912, has an unknown result. The second match, on 19 May 1912, ended in a 2–1 Ponte Preta win in a Campeonato Campineiro match.

The fourth fixture, on 23 August 1914, was a "challenge" held on the Parque Arraialense field, in the "District of Sousas". After Guarani's 2–0 win, Macaca fans and directors began writing to the newspapers blaming their defeat on the referee, as the Bugrinos responded, creating great controversy, with mutual offenses.

Two years later, on 21 May, the tension between the two teams reached its peak. The Campeonato Campineiro match at the hippodrome of Campinas and ended in a fight, involving players and fans of both clubs. Guarani won by 2–0.

On 26 September 1948, in the first derby of Moisés Lucarelli, Ponte Preta's stadium, Guarani won 1–0.

On 7 June 1953, in the first derby of Brinco de Ouro, Guarani's stadium, Ponte Preta won 3–0.

In 1981, Guarani and Ponte Preta clashed in the finals of the first stage of the Campeonato Paulista, whose winner would directly qualify to the finals of the championship. After a 1–1 draw at Brinco de Ouro, Ponte Preta won 3–2 at Moisés Lucarelli and took the final. This match was considered the most important in the history of the derby at the time.

In 2012, when the fixture completed 100 years of history, the two teams from Campinas encountered in the semifinals of the Campeonato Paulista. In a single match at Brinco de Ouro, Bugre made a comeback and won 3–1, advancing to the finals.

== Statistics ==
=== Head to head statistics ===
Competition	Matches	Guarani wins	Draws	Ponte wins	Guarani goals	Ponte Goals
Campeonato Brasileiro Série A	14	4	6	4	14	15
Campeonato Brasileiro Série B	18	5	7	6	11	16
Campeonato Brasileiro Série C	3	0	1	2	1	4
Campeonato Paulista	84	23	33	28	97	109
Campeonato Paulista Série A2	4	4	0	0	8	3
Campeonato Campineiro	33	13	8	12	50	46
Taça da Cidade de Campinas	10	4	1	5	18	17
Torneio Rio-São Paulo	1	0	1	0	1	1
Campeonato do Interior	9	2	3	4	10	13
Taça Amizade	13	5	5	3	25	17
Other tournaments and friendly matches	23	12	5	6	41	35
Total	212*	72	70	70	276	276

*Does not include the first derby on 24 March 1912, whose result is unknown.

=== Records ===
- Guarani's largest win at Brinco de Ouro: 6–0 on 5 May 1960.
- Ponte Preta's largest win at Brinco de Ouro: 4–0 on 22 August 1954
- Guarani's largest win at Moisés Lucarelli: 5–2 on 29 March 1953.
- Ponte Preta's largest win at Moisés Lucarelli: 4–0 on 6 July 1952.
- Guarani's longest unbeaten run: 14 matches (6 wins and 8 draws) between 28 June 1987 and 28 October 2002.
- Ponte Preta's longest unbeaten run: 16 matches (8 wins and 8 draws) between 27 June 1979 and 2 September 1984.
- Largest attendance: 38,948; Guarani 2–0 Ponte Preta (3 June 1979); Pacaembu Stadium

=== Statistics in the Campeonato Paulista ===
- Matches: 83
- Guarani wins: 23
- Ponte Preta wins: 28
- Drawn: 33
- Guarani goals: 97
- Ponte Preta goals: 109

==== List of matches ====
- Ponte Preta 1–2 Guarani, 12 August 1951 (Moisés Lucarelli)
- Ponte Preta 2–2 Guarani, 2 December 1951 (Moisés Lucarelli)
- Ponte Preta 3–4 Guarani, 5 October 1952 (Moisés Lucarelli)
- Guarani 2–2 Ponte Preta, 25 January 1953 (Guanabara Stadium)
- Guarani 0–0 Ponte Preta, 13 September 1953 (Brinco de Ouro)
- Ponte Preta 0–1 Guarani, 31 January 1954 (Moisés Lucarelli)
- Guarani 0–4 Ponte Preta, 22 August 1954 (Brinco de Ouro)
- Ponte Preta 1–0 Guarani, 13 February 1955 (Moisés Lucarelli)
- Guarani 5–1 Ponte Preta, 28 August 1955 (Brinco de Ouro)
- Ponte Preta 2–0 Guarani, 11 December 1955 (Moisés Lucarelli)
- Guarani 2–1 Ponte Preta, 12 August 1956, (Moisés Lucarelli)
- Guarani 3–1 Ponte Preta, 9 December 1956, (Brinco de Ouro)
- Ponte Preta 4–1 Guarani, 13 January 1957, (Moisés Lucarelli)
- Guarani 1–2 Ponte Preta, 11 August 1957, (Brinco de Ouro)
- Guarani 1–4 Ponte Preta, 10 August 1958 (Brinco de Ouro)
- Ponte Preta 2–2 Guarani, 7 December 1958 (Moisés Lucarelli)
- Guarani 0–0 Ponte Preta, 31 May 1959 (Brinco de Ouro)
- Ponte Preta 1–2 Guarani, 25 October 1959 (Moisés Lucarelli)
- Ponte Preta 3–2 Guarani, 21 August 1960 (Moisés Lucarelli)
- Guarani 3–0 Ponte Preta, 25 September 1960 (Brinco de Ouro)
- Ponte Preta 1–0 Guarani, 12 July 1970 (Moisés Lucarelli)
- Guarani 2–2 Ponte Preta, 19 August 1970 (Brinco de Ouro)
- Ponte Preta 1–0 Guarani, 28 March 1971 (Moisés Lucarelli)
- Ponte Preta 1–0 Guarani, 20 June 1971 (Moisés Lucarelli)
- Ponte Preta 0–0 Guarani, 5 March 1972 (Moisés Lucarelli)
- Ponte Preta 0–0 Guarani, 16 July 1972 (Moisés Lucarelli)
- Guarani 2–0 Ponte Preta, 13 May 1973 (Brinco de Ouro)
- Guarani 0–0 Ponte Preta, 29 July 1973 (Brinco de Ouro)
- Guarani 0–0 Ponte Preta, 18 August 1974 (Brinco de Ouro)
- Ponte Preta 0–1 Guarani, 27 October 1974 (Moisés Lucarelli)
- Ponte Preta 0–1 Guarani, 23 March 1975 (Moisés Lucarelli)
- Ponte Preta 2–1 Guarani, 7 March 1976 (Moisés Lucarelli)
- Guarani 0–0 Ponte Preta, 22 August 1976 (Brinco de Ouro)
- Ponte Preta 3–1 Guarani, 27 February 1977 (Moisés Lucarelli)
- Guarani 0–0 Ponte Preta, 7 August 1977 (Brinco de Ouro)
- Ponte Preta 2–0 Guarani, 4 September 1977 (Moisés Lucarelli)
- Ponte Preta 0–0 Guarani, 5 November 1978 (Moisés Lucarelli)
- Guarani 1–1 Ponte Preta, 3 December 1978 (Brinco de Ouro)
- Guarani 2–0 Ponte Preta, 3 June 1979 (Pacaembu Stadium, São Paulo)
- Ponte Preta 1–1 Guarani, 27 June 1979 (Moisés Lucarelli)
- Ponte Preta 1–0 Guarani, 19 August 1979 (Moisés Lucarelli)
- Guarani 1–1 Ponte Preta, 21 October 1979 (Brinco de Ouro)
- Ponte Preta 2–1 Guarani, 27 January 1980 (Moisés Lucarelli)
- Guarani 0–1 Ponte Preta, 30 January 1980 (Brinco de Ouro)
- Ponte Preta 3–0 Guarani, 20 July 1980 (Moisés Lucarelli)
- Guarani 0–0 Ponte Preta, 5 October 1980 (Brinco de Ouro)
- Ponte Preta 0–0 Guarani, 5 July 1981 (Moisés Lucarelli)
- Guarani 1–1 Ponte Preta, 1 August 1981 (Brinco de Ouro)
- Ponte Preta 3–2 Guarani, 5 August 1981 (Moisés Lucarelli)
- Guarani 0–0 Ponte Preta, 27 September 1981 (Brinco de Ouro)
- Guarani 1–1 Ponte Preta, 12 September 1982 (Brinco de Ouro)
- Ponte Preta 0–0 Guarani, 23 November 1982 (Moisés Lucarelli)
- Ponte Preta 1–0 Guarani, 10 July 1983 (Moisés Lucarelli)
- Guarani 0–1 Ponte Preta, 23 October 1983 (Brinco de Ouro)
- Ponte Preta 2–1 Guarani, 2 September 1984 (Moisés Lucarelli)
- Guarani 3–1 Ponte Preta, 4 November 1984 (Brinco de Ouro)
- Ponte Preta 3–0 Guarani, 9 June 1985 (Moisés Lucarelli)
- Guarani 2–1 Ponte Preta, 8 September 1985 (Brinco de Ouro)
- Ponte Preta 1–1 Guarani, 20 April 1986 (Moisés Lucarelli)
- Guarani 1–1 Ponte Preta, 20 July 1986 (Brinco de Ouro)
- Guarani 0–2 Ponte Preta, 3 May 1987 (Brinco de Ouro)
- Ponte Preta 0–2 Guarani, 28 June 1987 (Moisés Lucarelli)
- Guarani 0–0 Ponte Preta, 18 March 1990 (Brinco de Ouro)
- Ponte Preta 1–2 Guarani, 24 January 1993 (Moisés Lucarelli)
- Guarani 1–0 Ponte Preta, 21 March 1993 (Brinco de Ouro)
- Ponte Preta 1–1 Guarani, 5 March 1994 (Moisés Lucarelli)
- Guarani 2–2 Ponte Preta, 8 May 1994 (Brinco de Ouro)
- Ponte Preta 2–2 Guarani, 2 April 1995 (Moisés Lucarelli)
- Guarani 2–2 Ponte Preta, 7 May 1995 (Brinco de Ouro)
- Guarani 2–1 Ponte Preta, 4 February 2001 (Brinco de Ouro)
- Ponte Preta 1–3 Guarani, 23 February 2003 (Moisés Lucarelli)
- Guarani 2–2 Ponte Preta, 29 January 2005 (Brinco de Ouro)
- Ponte Preta 2–2 Guarani, 5 February 2006 (Moisés Lucarelli)
- Ponte Preta 4–2 Guarani, 16 March 2008 (Moisés Lucarelli)
- Guarani 2–2 Ponte Preta, 8 February 2009 (Brinco de Ouro)
- Ponte Preta 1–1 Guarani, 24 March 2012 (Moisés Lucarelli)
- Guarani 3–1 Ponte Preta, 29 April 2012 (Brinco de Ouro)
- Guarani 1–3 Ponte Preta, 26 January 2013 (Brinco de Ouro)
- Ponte Preta 3–0 Guarani, 16 March 2019 (Moisés Lucarelli)
- Guarani 3–2 Ponte Preta, 16 March 2020 (Brinco de Ouro)
- Ponte Preta 3–1 Guarani, 5 May 2021 (Moisés Lucarelli)
- Guarani 3–0 Ponte Preta, 19 February 2022 (Brinco de Ouro)
- Ponte Preta 2–0 Guarani, 9 February 2025 (Moisés Lucarelli)
- Guarani 1–0 Ponte Preta, 31 January 2026 (Brinco de Ouro)

=== Derbies in the Campeonato Brasileiro Serie A ===
- Matches: 14
- Guarani wins: 4
- Ponte Preta wins: 4
- Drawn: 6
- Guarani goals: 14
- Ponte Preta goals: 15

==== List of matches ====
- Guarani 0–0 Ponte Preta, 3 October 1976, attendance: 14.285 (Brinco de Ouro).
- Guarani 0–1 Ponte Preta, 20 November 1977, attendance: 22.309 (Brinco de Ouro).
- Guarani 2–1 Ponte Preta, 23 April 1978, attendance: 21.397 (Brinco de Ouro).
- Guarani 1–1 Ponte Preta, 10 July 1985, attendance: 15.505 (Brinco de Ouro).
- Ponte Preta 0–0 Guarani, 17 July 1985, attendance: 13.904 (Moisés Lucarelli).
- Guarani 2–0 Ponte Preta, 26 July 1998, attendance: 22.139 (Brinco de Ouro).
- Ponte Preta 0–0 Guarani, 18 August 1999, attendance: 22.609 (Moisés Lucarelli).
- Guarani 2–1 Ponte Preta, 2 November 2000, attendance: 21.539 (Brinco de Ouro).
- Ponte Preta 1–1 Guarani, 21 October 2001, attendance: 17.125 (Moisés Lucarelli).
- Guarani 2–4 Ponte Preta, 28 October 2002, attendance: 16.384 (Brinco de Ouro).
- Ponte Preta 0–2 Guarani, 14 June 2003, attendance: 8.918 (Moisés Lucarelli).
- Guarani 1–3 Ponte Preta, 11 October 2003, attendance: 8.795 (Brinco de Ouro).
- Ponte Preta 3–1 Guarani, 10 July 2004, attendance: 6.819 (Moisés Lucarelli).
- Guarani 0–0 Ponte Preta, 24 October 2004, attendance: 10.094 (Brinco de Ouro).

== About Guarani ==
- Name: Guarani Futebol Clube
- Foundation: 2 April 1911
- City: Campinas
- Nickname: "Bugre"
- Mascot: Índio (Indigenous; native)
- Stadium: Brinco de Ouro
- Capacity: 29,130
- Titles: 1 Campeonato Brasileiro, 1 Campeonato Brasileiro Série B, 5 Campeonatos Paulistas do Interior and 4 Campeonato Paulista Série A2.
- Legends: Amoroso, Luizão, Zenon, João Paulo, Evair and Fumagalli.
- 2026 Season: Campeonato Brasileiro Série C and Campeonato Paulista Série A1.

Home kit

== About Ponte Preta ==
- Name: Associação Atlética Ponte Preta
- Foundation: 11 August 1900
- City: Campinas
- Nickname: "Macaca"
- Mascot: Macaca (She-monkey)
- Stadium: Moisés Lucarelli
- Capacity: 19,722
- Titles: 1 Campeonato Brasileiro Série C, 6 Campeonatos Paulistas do Interior and 3 Campeonato Paulista Série A2.
- Legends: Dicá, Carlos, Oscar, Polozzi, Juninho, Washington, Waldir Peres and Luís Fabiano.
- 2026 Season: Campeonato Brasileiro Série B and Campeonato Paulista Série A1.

Home kit

== See also ==
- Clássico Majestoso
- Paulista Derby

== Sources ==
- Website Guarani
- Website Ponte Preta
- Futpédia Globo: Ponte Preta x Guarani - History of battles in the Campeonato Paulista
