= Estádio da Fazendinha (Ituiutaba) =

Brazilian stadium

Coordinates: 18°59′S 49°28′W

- Interactive map of Estádio da Fazendinha
- Location: Ituiutaba, Brazil
- Capacity: 3,840

Tenant
- Ituiutaba Esporte Clube

Estádio da Fazendinha is a sports stadium in Ituiutaba, Brazil. It has a maximum capacity of 3,840 people.

It is the home of Ituiutaba Esporte Clube.
