= Engenheiro Beltrão =

- Municipality
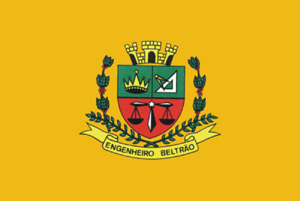
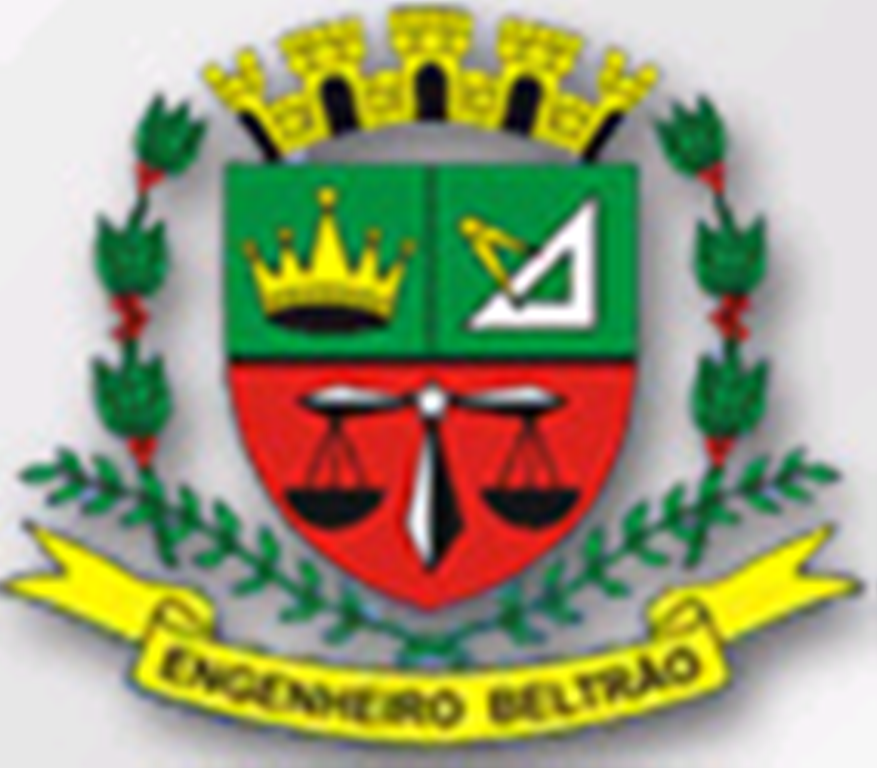
- Flag Coat of arms

- Municipal location within the State of Paraná

- Location in Brazil
- Coordinates: 23.79722°S 52.26917°W
- Country: Brazil
- State: Paraná
- Municipality: Engenheiro Beltrão

Government
  - Mayor: Rogério Rigueti Gomes

Area
  - Total: 467.470 km^{2} (180.491 sq mi)
- Elevation: 479 m (1,572 ft)

Population (2020)
  - Total: 13,981
  - Density: 29.908/km^{2} (77.461/sq mi)
- Demonym: engenheiro-beltrense
- Time zone: UTC−3 (BRT)
- Website: engenheirobeltrao.pr.gov.br

Engenheiro Beltrão is a municipality in the Brazilian state of Paraná. It is about 64 kilometres (40 mi) southwest of the city of Maringá. It was founded in 1954 It has an area of 467.470 square kilometres (180.491 sq mi). It has a Humid subtropical climate. As of 2020 the estimated population was 13,981.

== Geography ==
Engenheiro Beltrão is in the state of Paraná, Brazil. It has an area of 467.470 square kilometres (180.491 sq mi) as of 2018. The elevation above sea level is about 520 metres (1,710 ft). The municipality is on the left bank of the Ivaí River, in the central region of Paraná, to the northwest. It 55 kilometres (34 mi) from Maringá, 450 kilometres (280 mi) from Curitiba and 350 kilometres (220 mi) from Foz do Iguaçu.

== History ==
Colonization of the region began in the 1930s, when peasants accompanied by their families moved into the fertile lands, which they bought at low prices and with easy payment terms, and cleared the virgin forest to make way for agriculture. The Sociedade Técnica e Colonizadora Engenheiro Beltrão Ltda acquired a huge area of land before 1950 in the east of the municipality of Peabiru and the northeast of Campo Mourão, between the rivers Mourão and Ivaí. The company cleared, colonized and developed coffee plantations in the region, which would become the present municipality of Engenheiro Beltrão. The land was divided by the highway built from Campo Mourão to Maringá. The company founded the town of Engenheiro Beltrão on that road, named after the company's director Francisco Gutierrez Beltrão.

On 14 November 1951 the land was made the district of Engenheiro Beltrão within the municipality of Campo Mourão. On 14 December 1951 the municipality of Peabiru was split off from Campo Mourão, including the district of Engenheiro Beltrão. On 26 November 1954 Engenheiro Beltrão was split from Peabiru as a separate municipality. The first elections of the municipal executive were held on 3 October 1954. Various other territorial splits and additions were made since then. As of 14 May 2001 the municipality had 6 districts: Engenheiro Beltrão, Figueira do Oeste, Ivailândia, Sertãozinho, Sussuí and Triângulo.

== Climate ==
The Köppen climate type is Cfa : Humid subtropical climate. The average annual temperature is 22 °C (72 °F). The average annual rainfall is 2,148 millimetres (84.6 in).

Engenheiro Beltrão, Paraná (state)|Paraná

Climate chart (precipitation, max. and min. temperature)
J	F	M	A	M	J	J	A	S	O	N	D
195 27 19	245 28 20	231 31 19	149 29 17	159 22 13	356 22 13	89 22 12	21 25 13	168 31 13	123 34 17	172 33 17	241 30 19
- █ Average max. and min. temperatures in °C
- █ Precipitation totals in mm
Imperial conversion
J	F	M	A	M	J	J	A	S	O	N	D
7.7 81 66	9.6 82 68	9.1 88 66	5.9 84 63	6.3 72 55	14 72 55	3.5 72 54	0.8 77 55	6.6 88 55	4.8 93 63	6.8 91 63	9.5 86 66
- █ Average max. and min. temperatures in °F
- █ Precipitation totals in inches

== Demographics ==
The population in the 2010 census was 13,906. The estimated population as of 2019 was 14,000. Population density as of 2010 was 2,975 inhabitants per square kilometre (7,710/sq mi). As of 2010, 97.8% of the population had attended school between the ages of 6 and 14. Also as of 2010, the municipal Human Development Index was 0.730. This compares to 0.489 in 1991 and 0.650 in 2000.

On the 2010 census religion was reported as Catholic by 11,211 people, Evangelical by 2,220 people and Animism by 20 people.

== Economy ==
Agriculture is still the main economic activity in the region. The land is very fertile, and produces a wide variety of crops, including grains and sugarcane. There is extensive chicken farming. Industries include clothing production, which is growing, and the alcohol industry. In 2017, the average monthly salary was 1.9 minimum wages. Employed people were 17.8% of the total population. Households with monthly income of up to half a minimum wage per person represent 30.2% of the population. Recent estimates of GDP per capita:

== Health and sanitation ==
20.4% of households have adequate sanitation, 97.1% of urban households are on public roads with afforestation and 29.5% of urban households are on public roads with adequate urbanization (presence of manhole, sidewalk, pavement and curb). Annual hospitalizations due to diarrhea are 5.8 per 1,000 inhabitants. Deaths per 1,000 live births:

- 2006: 5.18
- 2007: 16.04
- 2008: 13.51
- 2009: 6.02
- 2010: 11.83
- 2011: 12.66
- 2012: 24.84
- 2014: 15.71
- 2015: 50.56
- 2016: 17.54

== Municipal finances ==
Recent figures for committed municipal expenditure:

Recent figures for realized municipal revenue:

== Notable people ==
- Felipe Martins (b. 1990) – footballer

== Sources ==
- Engenheiro Beltrão Paraná – PR / Histórico, IBGE
- Brasil / Paraná (state)|Paraná / Engenheiro Beltrão, IBGE
- Dados Estatísticos do Município de Engenheiro Beltrão, Prefeitura de Engenheiro Beltrão
- "Engenheiro Beltrão", Geonames
- Engenheiro Beltrão, Governo do Paraná
- Engenheiro Beltrão, Brazilian Institute of Geography and Statistics
- "Engenheiro Beltrão, Engenheiro Beltrão, Brazil", Mindat
- NASA Earth Observations Data Set Index, NASA, archived from the original on 28 November 2017
- NASA Earth Observations: Rainfall (1 month - TRMM), NASA/Tropical Rainfall Monitoring Mission, archived from the original on 19 April 2019
- Prefeitura de Engenheiro Beltrão, Prefeitura de Engenheiro Beltrão
