= Estádio Brinco de Ouro =

Football stadium in Campinas, São Paulo state, Brazil

Estádio Brinco de Ouro da Princesa
- Brinco de Ouro (The Golden Earring)
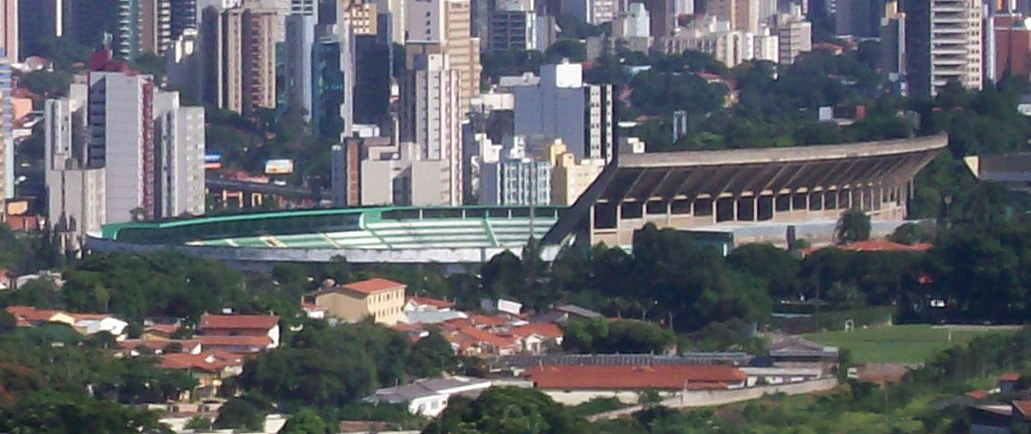
- Sisbrace
- Interactive map of Estádio Brinco de Ouro da Princesa
- Full name: Estádio Brinco de Ouro da Princesa
- Location: Campinas, Brazil
- Coordinates: 22°54′35″S 47°02′37″W
- Owner: Guarani
- Capacity: 29,130
- Surface: Grass
- Field size: 105 by 68 metres (114.8 yd × 74.4 yd)

Construction
- Opened: May 31, 1953
- Architects: Ícaro de Castro Mello; Osvaldo Correio Gonçalves

Tenant
- Guarani

The Estádio Brinco de Ouro da Princesa Portuguese pronunciation: [isˈtadʒju ˈbɾĩku dʒi ˈowɾu] ("Princess' Golden Earring Stadium"), also known as Estádio Brinco de Ouro ("Golden Earring Stadium"), or just Brinco de Ouro ("Golden Earring"), is a football stadium inaugurated on May 31, 1953 in Campinas, São Paulo state, Brazil with a maximum capacity of 29,130 people. The stadium is owned by Guarani Futebol Clube and has a pitch size of 105,12m x 70,12m (today is 105m x 68m) Brinco de Ouro's architects were Ícaro de Castro Mello and Osvaldo Correio Gonçalves.

The stadium's peculiar name comes from the presentation of the then-unnamed stadium's project to the newspaper Correio Popular with the title "Golden earring for the "princess", comparing the circular shape of the future stadium to an earring and making a pun with the nickname of the city of Campinas — Princesa D'Oeste (Princess of the West).

== History ==
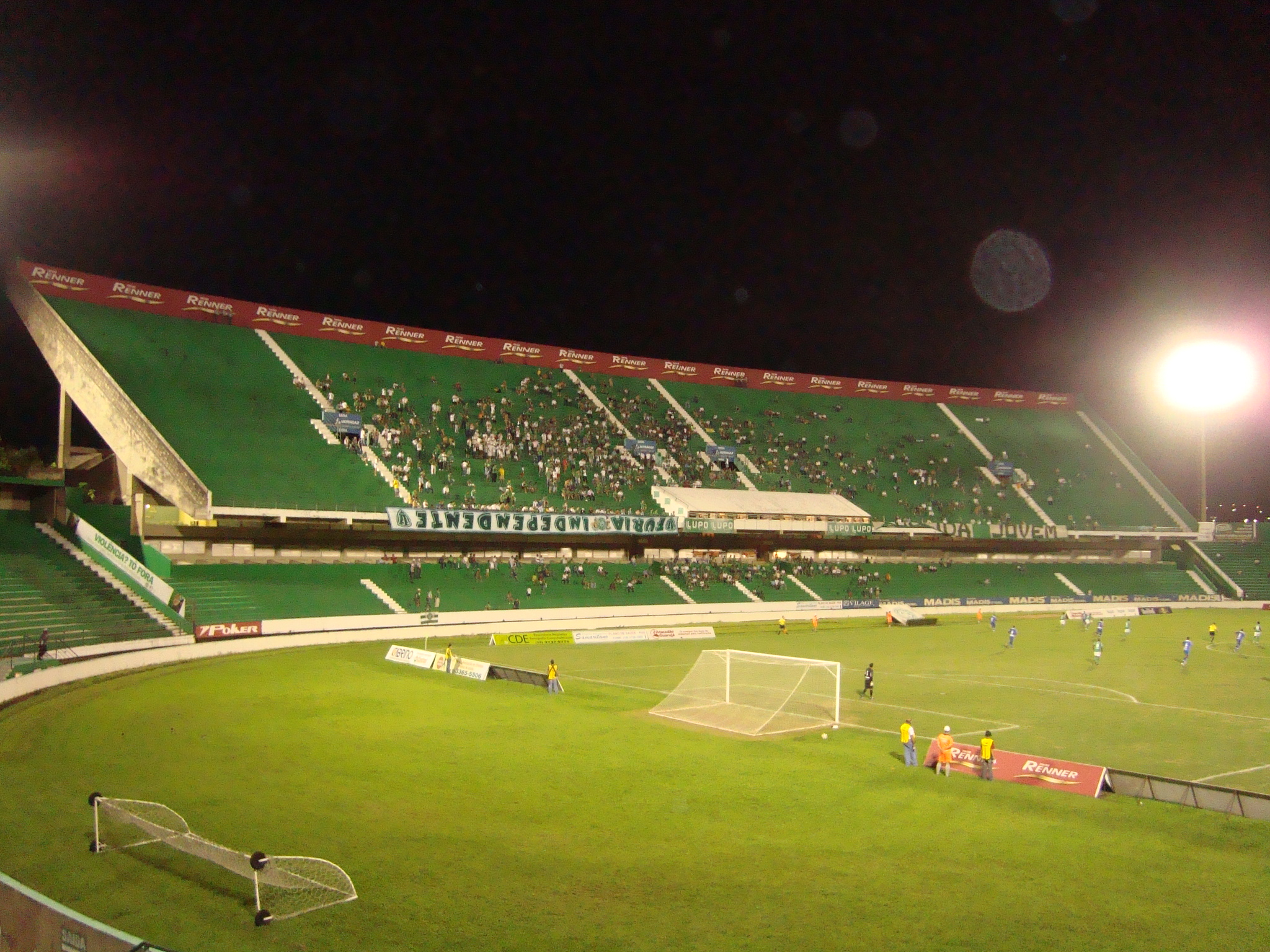
Brinco de Ouro stadium during a night game.

The stadium was inaugurated on May 31, 1953, originally with wooden bleachers and a maximum capacity of 15,000 spectators. 22 years later, the wood bleachers were replaced by concrete bleachers, increasing the stadium maximum capacity to 25,000 people. In 1970, another bleachers block was added, and the maximum capacity was increased to 35,000 spectators. In 1978, Guarani won the Brazilian Championship, and the club board of directors decided to increase again the stadium maximum capacity. In 1980, toboggan-like bleachers were built, and the stadium maximum capacity was increased to 55,000 people. Today, the stadium has a maximum capacity of 29,130 spectators.

The inaugural match was played on May 31, 1953, when Guarani beat Palmeiras 3-1. The first goal of the stadium was scored by Guarani's Nilo.

The stadium's attendance record currently stands at 52,002, set on April 15, 1982 when Flamengo beat Guarani 3-2.

== See also ==
- List of football stadiums in Brazil
- Lists of stadiums
