= 2014 Campeonato Acreano =

Campeonato Acreano
- Season: 2014
- Champions: Rio Branco (44th title)
- Relegated: Andirá
- Copa do Brasil: Atlético Acreano; Rio Branco
- Série D: Atlético Acreano
- Top goalscorer: Gustavo Luz (Vasco-AC) (8 goals)

The 2013 Campeonato Acreano was the 68th season of the Campeonato Acreano, the top professional football league of the state of Acre. Rio Branco were champions for the 44th time. The championship started 16 March, 2014, and ended on 10 June.

== Format ==
The first stage is in double round-robin. The best four teams qualify to Final Stage.

The champion and the runner-up qualify to the 2015 Copa do Brasil. The best team on the final standing also qualifies to the 2014 Campeonato Brasileiro Série D.

== Teams ==
Club	Home city	2013 result
Alto Acre	Epitaciolândia	6th
Andirá	Rio Branco	7th
Atlético	Rio Branco	3rd
Galvez	Rio Branco	4th
Náuas	Cruzeiro do Sul	8th
Plácido de Castro	Plácido de Castro	1st
Rio Branco	Rio Branco	2nd
Vasco	Rio Branco	1st (2nd division)

Náuas initially joined to replace Galvez, which had financial issues. However, as Juventus-AC withdrew, Galvez was invited back to the championship.

== First stage ==
Pos	Team	Pld	W	D	L	GF	GA	GD	Pts	Qualification or relegation
1	Atlético Acreano	14	11	3	0	29	9	+20	36	Advanced to the Final Stage
2	Rio Branco	14	9	3	2	27	7	+20	30	Advanced to the Final Stage
3	Plácido de Castro	14	8	1	5	28	13	+15	25	Advanced to the Final Stage
4	Galvez	14	5	4	5	26	23	+3	19	Advanced to the Final Stage
5	Vasco	14	4	3	7	28	29	−1	15	
6	Náuas	14	4	3	7	19	27	−8	15	
7	Alto Acre	14	3	2	9	15	39	−24	11	
8	Andirá	14	2	1	11	11	36	−25	7	Relegated to the 2015 Second Division of Campeonao Acreano

== Final stage ==
Semifinals
1	Atlético Acreano	1	1	2
4	Galvez	1	0	1
3	Plácido de Castro	0	1	1
2	Rio Branco	1	1	2

Finals
1	Atlético Acreano	1	2 (2)	3
2	Rio Branco	1	2 (3)	3
