= 2012 Campeonato Acreano =

Campeonato Acreano
- Season: 2012
- Champions: Rio Branco (28th title)
- Relegated: Alto Acre
- Copa do Brasil: Rio Branco; Atlético Acreano
- Série D: Atlético Acreano

The 2012 Campeonato Acreano was the 66th season of the Campeonato Acreano, the top professional football league of the state of Acre. Rio Branco were champions for the 28th time.

== Teams ==
Club	Home city	2011 result
Andirá	Rio Branco	1st (2nd division)
Alto Acre	Epitaciolândia	5th
Atlético	Rio Branco	3rd
Independência	Rio Branco	7th
Juventus	Rio Branco	4th
Náuas	Cruzeiro do Sul	2nd
Plácido de Castro	Plácido de Castro	6th
Rio Branco	Rio Branco	1st (Champions)

== First stage ==
Pos	Team	Pld	W	D	L	GF	GA	GD	Pts	Qualification or relegation
1	Rio Branco	14	10	4	0	48	20	+28	34	Advanced to the Final Stage
2	Independência	14	7	4	3	22	20	+2	25	Advanced to the Final Stage
3	Atlético Acreano	14	7	3	4	28	20	+8	24	Advanced to the Final Stage
4	Plácido de Castro	14	6	2	6	19	24	−5	20	Advanced to the Final Stage
5	Juventus-AC	14	5	5	4	29	22	+7	20	
6	Andirá	14	5	1	8	21	34	−13	16	
7	Náuas	13	3	3	7	18	22	−4	12	
8	Alto Acre	13	1	0	12	10	33	−23	3	Relegated to the 2013 Second Division of Campeonao Acreano

== Final stage ==
Semifinals
1	Rio Branco	2	2	4
4	Plácido de Castro	1	1	2
2	Independência	2	0	2
3	Atlético	2	1	3

Finals
1	Rio Branco	4	4	8
3	Atlético	2	3	5

Rio Branco and Atlético qualified for 2013 Copa do Brasil
