= 2015 Campeonato Acreano =

Campeonato Acriano
- Season: 2015
- Champions: Rio Branco
- Relegated: Náuas
- Série D: Rio Branco
- Copa Verde: Rio Branco
- Copa do Brasil: Rio Branco; Galvez
- Biggest home win: Rio Branco 9–0 Náuas (19 April 2015)
- Biggest away win: Náuas 1–7 Rio Branco (6 June 2015)
- Highest scoring: Rio Branco 9–0 Náuas (19 April 2015); Náuas 1–7 Rio Branco (6 June 2015)

The 2015 Campeonato Acriano de Futebol was the 69th edition of the Acre's top professional football league. The competition began on 1 March and ended on 27 June. Rio Branco won the championship for the 45th time.

== First stage ==
Pos	Team	Pld	W	D	L	GF	GA	GD	Pts	Qualification or relegation
1	Atlético Acreano	14	11	2	1	36	9	+27	35	Qualifies to the semi-finals
2	Rio Branco	14	9	3	2	10	5	+5	30	Qualifies to the semi-finals
3	Plácido de Castro	14	7	2	5	23	19	+4	23	Qualifies to the semi-finals
4	Galvez	14	7	2	5	23	20	+3	23	Qualifies to the semi-finals
5	Amax	14	5	4	5	19	21	−2	19	
6	Vasco-AC	14	3	2	9	22	35	−13	11	
7	Alto Acre	14	3	2	9	18	41	−23	11	
8	Náuas	14	2	1	11	9	41	−32	7	Relegated

== Semi-finals ==
=== First leg ===
13 June 2015
16:00 UTC–5

Galvez	1–1	Atlético Acreano
Rafael 78'	Report	Josy 36'

Arena da Floresta, Rio Branco
Referee: Antônio Neuriclaudio

13 June 2015
18:00 UTC–5

Plácido de Castro	0–2	Rio Branco
	Report	Alexandre Matão 22'; Dudu Mandai 72'

Arena da Floresta, Rio Branco
Referee: José Antônio Pinheiro

=== Second leg ===
16 June 2015
20:00 UTC–5

Atlético Acreano	1–2 (a.e.t.)	Galvez
Rafael 29' (o.g.)	Report	Rafael 6'; Rick 103'

Arena da Floresta, Rio Branco
Attendance: 991
Referee: Carlos Santos de Almeida

16 June 2015
18:00 UTC–5

Rio Branco	2–1	Plácido de Castro
Alexandre Matão 2', 23'	Report	China 16'

Arena da Floresta, Rio Branco
Referee: Josimar Souza de Almeida

== Finals ==
20 June 2015
17:00 UTC–5

Galvez	1–2	Rio Branco
George 54'	Report	Jeferson 36'; Carciano 82'

Arena da Floresta, Rio Branco
Attendance: 935
Referee: Carlos Ronne Casas

27 June 2015
19:00 UTC–5

Rio Branco	2–0	Galvez
Robinho 16'; Evandro Russo 38'	Report

Florestão, Rio Branco
Attendance: 1,762
Referee: Josimar Almeida de Souza

2015 Campeonato Acriano
champions
Rio Branco
