= Neto Pessoa =

Brazilian footballer

Personal information
- Full name: Altemir Cordeiro Pessôa Neto
- Date of birth: May 16, 1994 (age 32)
- Place of birth: Rio Branco, Brazil
- Height: 1.78 m (5 ft 10 in)
- Position: Forward

Team information
- Current team: Sport Recife
- Number: 19

Senior career*
Years	Team	Apps	(Gls)
2013–2014	Plácido de Castro	16	(1)
2014–2016	Rio Branco	1	(0)
2015	→ Andirá (loan)	1	(2)
2016	→ Nacional de Muriaé (loan)	2	(0)
2017–2018	Atlético Acreano	33	(10)
2019	ABC	23	(8)
2019	Náutico	10	(0)
2020–2021	Ypiranga	32	(13)
2021	Botafogo-SP	25	(6)
2021	Remo	15	(10)
2022	Sabah	6	(2)
2022–2023	Vila Nova	69	(14)
2024	Novorizontino	51	(10)
2025	Criciúma	5	(0)
2025–2026	Chapecoense	39	(7)
2026–	Sport Recife	11	(3)
- * Club domestic league appearances and goals as of 16 November 2026

Altemir Cordeiro Pessôa Neto (born May 16, 1994), commonly known as Neto Pessoa, is a Brazilian professional footballer who plays as a forward for Sport Recife.

== Club career ==
=== Plácido de Castro ===
Neto had his career started in 2012, in the Under-20 team of the countryside Plácido de Castro and with the ability to play in all positions of the attack soon was only one year in the base then in the state championship of 2013, he was already properly integrated into the professional team, under the command of coach Nilton Neri.

=== Rio Branco ===
Neto Pessoa, 19, was reintegrated into the Rio Branco squad to play in the Campeonato Acreano for the third time.

=== Nacional de Muriaé ===
On December 4, 2015 Neto Pessoa was announced as reinforcement of the Nacional de Muriaé in the dispute of Module II of the Campeonato Mineiro.

=== ABC ===
On October 16, 2018, ABC board confirmed neto's hiring for the 2019 season.

For ABC he who played 23 games and scored eight goals.

=== Náutico ===
On May 24, 2019 Timbu announced the signing of striker Neto Pessoa and on May 30 of the same month had his name published in the Daily Informative Bulletin (BID) of the Brazilian Football Confederation (CBF). This means that he is regularized and can take the field for Náutico.

=== Ypiranga ===
Neto Pessôa was the third highest scorer in the C Series of the Brazilian Championship. In 21 games, he scored ten goals for Ypiranga, ending his run with 32 games and 13 goals for Canarinho.

=== Botafogo ===
On February 11, 2021, Botafogo-SP announced another signing for the season via email. The tricolor confirmed the arrival of striker Neto Pessôa, 26, who played for the 2020 season for Ypiranga-RS.

Already on August 8, 2021, Botafogo and Neto entered into an agreement and the player left the São Paulo club in his passage, he played 25 matches between the Paulista championship and Série C do Brasileiro. There were six goals scored, four for the national and two for the state. He was used a lot by Algiers in both competitions, but the information is that for private reasons he preferred to go to the North of the country, where he was born.

=== Remo ===
On September 9, 2021, Neto Pessoa was hired to be the new striker of Remo for the sequel to the Campeonato Brasileiro Série B.

On the night of October 21, 2021, Remo thrashed Galvez 9-0 at Baenão, in a match valid for the round of 16 of the Copa Verde. One of the highlights of the victory was striker Neto Pessoa, who started for the first time with the Lion's shirt and contributed three goals and two assists.

He ended his spell with the blue shirt and made 15 matches and scored 10 goals-nine in the Copa Verde alone. He ended the 2021 season as the Lion's top scorer.

=== Sabah ===
After an excellent stint at Remo, from Pará, where he was a key player in winning the unprecedented title of the Copa Verde in season 21, Neto Pessoa agreed, for a year, with Sabah, from Malaysia.

=== Vila Nova ===
Vila Nova Futebol Clube closed the signing of Neto Pessoa who was presented at the Club goiano on July 20, 2022, which is in the dispute of Campeonato Brasileiro Série B of the Brazilian football.

== Honours ==
Plácido de Castro

- Campeonato Acreano: 2013

Rio Branco

- Campeonato Acreano: 2015

Náutico

- Campeonato Brasileiro Série C: 2019

Remo

- Copa Verde: 2021
