= Lucas Covolan =

Brazilian footballer (born 1991)

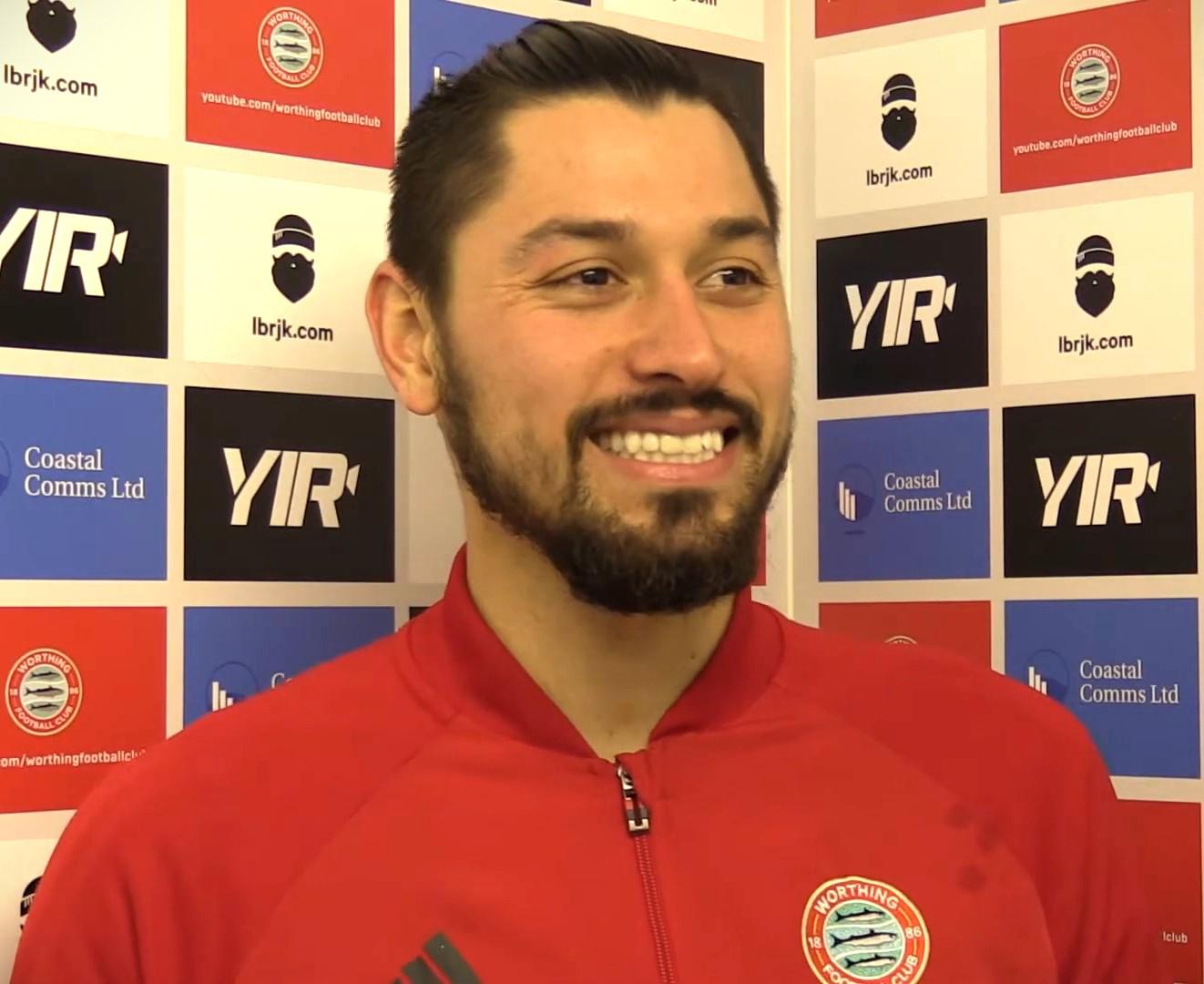
- Covolan with Worthing in 2018

Personal information
- Full name: Lucas Covolan Cavagnari
- Date of birth: 6 June 1991 (age 35)
- Place of birth: Curitiba, Brazil
- Height: 1.93 m (6 ft 4 in)
- Position: Goalkeeper

Team information
- Current team: Operário

Youth career
- 2007–2009: Trieste
- 2009–2012: Vasco da Gama

Senior career*
Years	Team	Apps	(Gls)
2012–2013	Atlético Paranaense	0	(0)
2013	→ Esportivo (loan)	0	(0)
2014	Toledo	0	(0)
2014	Rio Branco-AC	7	(0)
2014–2015	Atlético Rafal	23	(0)
2015–2016	Alaró	35	(0)
2016–2017	Whitehawk	23	(0)
2016	→ Lewes (loan)	5	(0)
2017–2019	Worthing	59	(0)
2019–2021	Torquay United	49	(0)
2021–2023	Port Vale	21	(0)
2022–2023	→ Chesterfield (loan)	13	(0)
2023–2024	Maidstone United	46	(0)
2024–2025	Braintree Town	23	(0)
2025	Ebbsfleet United	1	(0)
2025	Worthing	14	(0)
2025	Wealdstone	0	(0)
2025–	Operário	0	(0)

International career
2010	Brazil U20	2	(0)
- * Club domestic league appearances and goals as of 17:19, 18 October 2025 (UTC)

Lucas Covolan Cavagnari (born 6 June 1991) is a Brazilian professional footballer who plays as a goalkeeper for Campeonato Brasileiro Série D club Operário.

A Brazil under-20 international, he began his career with Trieste before turning professional at Vasco da Gama. He later had spells with Atlético Paranaense, Esportivo, Toledo and Rio Branco, winning a Campeonato Acreano title with Rio Branco in 2014. He then spent two years in Spain with Atlético Rafal and Alaró before joining the English club Whitehawk in 2016. He had a loan spell with Lewes and spent two seasons with Worthing before earning a move to Torquay United in May 2019. He scored a goal in the 2021 National League play-off final, which Torquay lost, before signing with English Football League club Port Vale in June 2021. He helped the club to win promotion out of League Two via the play-offs in 2022. He returned to the National League on a season-long loan with Chesterfield in July 2022. He signed with Maidstone United in August 2023 and was an unused substitute in their 2024 Kent Senior Cup final victory. He spent the first half of the 2024–25 season with Braintree Town and rejoined Worthing via Ebbsfleet United in February 2025. He signed with Wealdstone six months later. He returned to Brazil to play for Operário in December 2025.

== Early and personal life ==
Born in Curitiba, Covolan grew up supporting hometown club Atlético Paranaense. He has an Italian passport.

== Club career ==
=== Brazil ===
Covolan spent his early career with Trieste in his native Brazil. He was scouted by Vasco da Gama. After impressing on a two-week trial, he signed a professional contract at Vasco at 17. He acted as the practice goalkeeper for Juninho Pernambucano's free kick training sessions, later recalling that such was the player's ability that "I was basically just a cone". He returned from Rio de Janeiro after three years to sign with boyhood club Atlético Paranaense. He later recalled that Atlético had eight goalkeepers on their books and that he realised halfway into his three-year contract that he would never play a first-team game for the club. He tried to gain experience in senior football by leaving on loan but was injured in a warm-up exercise and sidelined for four months.

Covolan went on to feature in four match day squads as an unused substitute for Esportivo Bento Gonçalves, before joining Toledo in December 2013 and then Rio Branco in March 2014. He helped Rio Branco to win the Campeonato Acreano (Acre state league) in 2014 following a penalty shoot-out victory over Atlético Acreano, but was one of the three players released by the club on 7 May 2014.

=== Spain ===
Covolan moved to Spain later in 2014 and joined Tercera División team Atlético Rafal. He switched to fellow Mallorcan side Alaró the next year, making 35 appearances. He left the club following the death of head coach Julián Ronda. He spent three months on trial at Mallorca but was deemed to be too old at the age of 24.

=== English non-League ===
In 2016, he was approached by an agent to play for English National League South club Whitehawk, who were managed by the Argentinian Pablo Asensio. He made 23 league appearances for Whitehawk, and also spent a month on loan with Lewes, before signing for Isthmian League Premier Division side Worthing after a pre-season trial. He was named Supporters Player of the Year by Worthing's "Away Boys Fanatics" in the 2017–18 season and had trials at Aldershot Town, Luton Town and Stevenage. He broke his arm during a win at Moneyfields in the FA Cup on 6 October 2018.

=== Torquay United ===
He moved to Torquay United in May 2019 after impressing manager Gary Johnson on trial. He competed with Shaun MacDonald for a place in the first-team, but had to wait for his opportunity after picking up an injury in pre-season, making his first-team debut in a 2–1 win at Dover Athletic on 17 August. Covolan would play 25 league games in the 2019–20 season, with MacDonald playing the remaining 11 league matches in a season that was cut short due to the COVID-19 pandemic. He featured 26 times in the 2020–21 campaign, whilst MacDonald played 19 league games, as Torquay qualified for the play-offs with a second-place finish. On 20 June 2021, he scored an injury-time equaliser against Hartlepool United in the National League play-off final, which Torquay eventually lost on penalties, despite two saves from Covolan. His goal earned him comparisons to compatriot Alisson, a goalkeeper who had scored a headed goal for Liverpool earlier in the year; the pair had actually played against each other some years earlier in a tournament for under-23 players when Atlético Paranaense came up against Internacional.

=== Port Vale ===
On 23 June 2021, he signed a two-year contract with League Two side Port Vale; manager Darrell Clarke said that "he is hungry to prove he's a league-level player and we feel he has all the attributes to succeed at this level". However, the move would turn out to be the "lowest point" of his career as he struggled to handle the pressure of league football and suffered with depression as a result. Having already been shown a red card in a pre-season friendly, he was sent off on his English Football League debut after rushing off his goal-line to trip Nicke Kabamba during a 1–0 defeat at Northampton Town on 7 August. He returned after a serving a one match suspension and kept four clean sheets in his next seven games, saying that "you learn from every mistake and that is what makes you stronger". He was criticised by Clarke for an error during a win over Barrow on 16 October, but responded by saving a penalty in a 1–1 draw with Mansfield Town three days later. On 15 January 2022, he was sent off for kicking out at Swindon Town's Harry McKirdy after the pair jumped for a high ball moments before half-time during what would finish as a 3–1 home defeat; a furious Clarke said after the match that "he has got to learn from that otherwise he won't be staying at the club for very long". Covolan, who was suspended for four games for the incident, was supported by captain Tom Conlon, who said "he's one of us, he is a big part of the squad, the boys love him to bits". He was an unused substitute as Vale secured promotion out of the play-offs with victory over Mansfield Town in the final at Wembley Stadium. He played 22 games in the 2021–22 season, keeping seven clean sheets. David Flitcroft, the club's director of football, confirmed that the player's contract would not be renewed beyond June 2023.

==== Chesterfield (loan) ====
On 5 July 2022, Covolan returned to the National League to join Chesterfield on a season-long loan deal. On 6 August, he made his debut for the Spireites in a 2–2 draw with Dorking Wanderers, receiving a red card after 28 minutes for an "off the ball incident". Manager Paul Cook had stern words for Covolan after the match, saying that "it is something that Lucas will learn from quickly [and] if he doesn't learn quickly he won't be at the club, it is that simple". Covolan was returned to the starting eleven after Ross Fitzsimons stood in during his suspension, and by September was linked with a permanent move to Chesterfield. However, after making eight further starts he was sidelined with an ankle injury, whilst during Covolan's absence Fitzsimons was praised for his good form. He was not named in the 2023 National League play-off final matchday squad for the defeat to Notts County.

=== Return to English non-League ===
On 4 August 2023, with less than 24-hours until the start of the 2023–24 season, Covolan signed with newly-relegated National League South club Maidstone United. Maidstone defeated EFL clubs Barrow and Stevenage to reach the fourth round of the FA Cup, where they then knocked out Championship side Ipswich Town 2–1 at Portman Road, with Covolan named as man of the match having made a "string of saves" to help pull off the upset. Manager George Elokobi said that Covolan was the best goalkeeper in the National League South. He played every league game as Maidstone finished the 2023–24 season in fourth place, qualifying for the play-offs. He was an unused substitute in the 2024 Kent Senior Cup final victory over Ebbsfleet United. His teammates voted him as Players' Player of the Year. He was offered a new contract in May 2024.

On 20 August 2024, Covolan made his debut for Braintree Town in their 2–1 victory over Aldershot Town in a National League game at Cressing Road. He played a total of 29 matches in the first half of the 2024–25 season. On 4 January, the club announced that Covolan had departed the club following the expiration of his contract. On 15 February 2025, Colovan signed a short-term deal with Ebbsfleet United after the National League club had two senior goalkeepers ruled out injured.

On 21 February 2025, just one week after joining Ebbsfleet United, Covolan returned to National League South side Worthing. He made an instant impact by making what manager Chris Agutter called "a really big save" on his second debut for the club. He made 14 appearances in what remained of the 2024–25 season, though was on the bench for the play-off quarter-final defeat to Maidstone United. He was not retained beyond the end of the season.

On 8 August 2025, Covolan signed for National League side Wealdstone. He departed the club on 18 October upon the expiry of his short-term deal.

=== Return to Brazil ===
On 9 December 2025, Covolan returned to his native Brazil and signed with Operário of the Campeonato Brasileiro Série D.

== International career ==
Covolan spent time with the Brazil under-20 national team, winning two caps in 2010.

== Style of play ==
He has been described as an aggressive goalkeeper who helps the team defend with a high line, though tends to be caught in possession.

== Career statistics ==
As of match played 18 October 2025

Appearances and goals by club, season and competition
Club	Season	League			State League		National cup (Note: Includes Copa do Brasil, Copa del Rey, FA Cup)		League cup (Note: Includes Alan Turvey Trophy, EFL Cup)		Other		Total	
Club	Season	Division	Apps	Goals	Apps	Goals	Apps	Goals	Apps	Goals	Apps	Goals	Apps	Goals
Esportivo	2013	Gaúcho	—		0	0	—		—		—		0	0
Rio Branco-AC	2014	Série D	0	0	7	0	1	0	—		—		8	0
Atlético Rafal	2014–15	Tercera División	23	0	—		—		—		—		23	0
Alaró	2015–16	Tercera División	35	0	—		—		—		—		35	0
Whitehawk	2016–17	National League South	23	0	—		0	0	—		0	0	23	0
Lewes (loan)	2016–17	Isthmian League Division One South	5	0	—		0	0	0	0	1 (Note: Appearance(s) in the FA Trophy.)	0	6	0
Worthing	2017–18	Isthmian League Premier Division	44	0	—		1	0	0	0	2	0	47	0
Worthing	2018–19	Isthmian League Premier Division	15	0	—		3	0	1	0	0	0	19	0
Worthing	Total		59	0	0	0	4	0	1	0	2	0	66	0
Torquay United	2019–20	National League	25	0	—		1	0	—		1	0	27	0
Torquay United	2020–21	National League	24	0	—		1	0	—		3 (Note: One appearance in the FA Trophy and two appearances and one goal in the play-offs)	1	28	1
Torquay United	Total		49	0	—		2	0	0	0	4	1	55	1
Port Vale	2021–22	League Two	21	0	—		1	0	0	0	0	0	22	0
Chesterfield (loan)	2022–23	National League	13	0	—		1	0	—		1	0	15	0
Maidstone United	2023–24	National League South	46	0	—		7	0	—		5 (Note: Two appearances in the FA Trophy, one appearance in the Kent Senior Cup and two appearances in the play-offs)	0	58	0
Braintree Town	2024–25	National League	23	0	—		2	0	—		4 (Note: Three appearances in National League Cup, one appearance in FA Trophy)	0	29	0
Ebbsfleet United	2024–25	National League	1	0	—		—		—		—		1	0
Worthing	2024–25	National League South	14	0	—		—		—		0	0	14	0
Wealdstone	2025–26	National League	0	0	—		0	0	—		2 (Note: Appearances in the National League Cup)	0	2	0
Career total			312	0	7	0	18	0	1	0	19	1	356	1

== Honours ==
Rio Branco

- Campeonato Acreano: 2014

Port Vale

- EFL League Two play-offs: 2022

Maidstone United

- Kent Senior Cup: 2024

Individual

- Maidstone United Players' Player of the Year: 2023–24
