= América Futebol Clube (AC) =

América
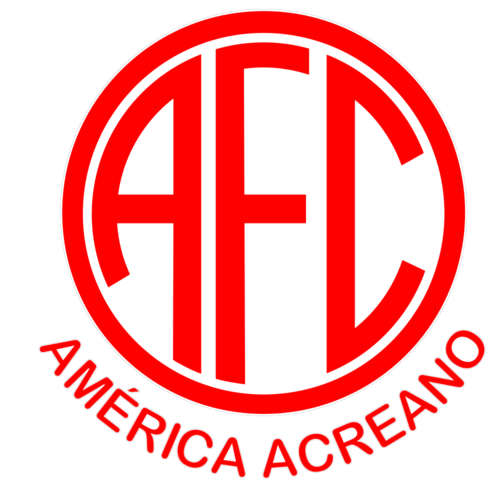
- Full name: América Futebol Clube
- Founded: 9 August 1919
- Dissolved: 1960
- Ground: Estádio José de Melo, Rio Branco, Acre state, Brazil
- Capacity: 8,000
Home colours	Away colours

América Futebol Clube, commonly known as América, was a Brazilian football team based in Rio Branco, Acre state. They won the Campeonato Acreano twice.

== History ==
The club was founded on 9 August 1919. They won the Campeonato Acriano in 1948, and in 1949. América eventually folded.

== Honours ==
- Campeonato Acreano
  - Winners (2): 1948, 1949
  - Runners-up (5): 1935, 1936, 1937, 1946, 1953
- Torneio Início do Acre
  - Winners (1): 1953

== Stadium ==
América Futebol Clube played their home games at Estádio José de Melo. The stadium has a maximum capacity of 8,000 people.
