= Testinha =

Brazilian footballer

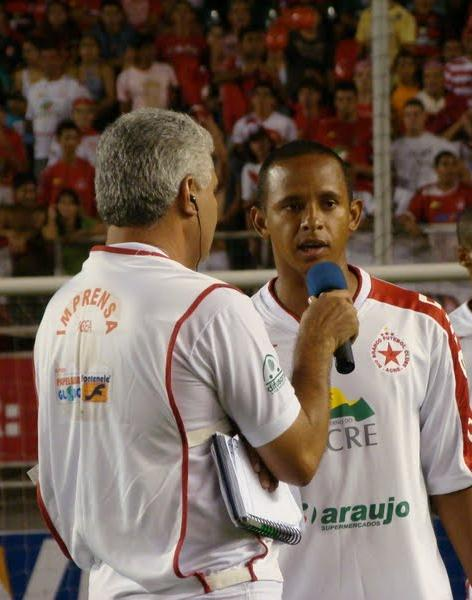

Personal information
- Full name: Djames Nascimento da Silva
- Date of birth: 27 December 1977 (age 48)
- Place of birth: Rio Branco, Brazil
- Height: 1.72 m (5 ft 8 in)
- Position: Midfielder

Senior career*
Years	Team	Apps	(Gls)
1995–1996	Rio Branco		
1997–1998	Leça		
1998–1999	Marítimo		
2000–2004	Coritiba		
2005	Cianorte		
2006	CSA		
2007–2013	Rio Branco		
2010	→ Botafogo-DF		
2014–2015	Acreano		
2016	Rio Branco		
- * Club domestic league appearances and goals

Djames Nascimento da Silva (born 27 December 1977), known as Testinha, is a Brazilian retired football midfielder.
