= Cavagnari =

Cavagnari is an Italian surname. Notable people with the surname include:

- Domenico Cavagnari (1876–1966), Italian admiral
- Lucas Covolan Cavagnari (born 1991), Brazilian footballer
- Pierre Louis Napoleon Cavagnari (1841–1879), Italian-British military administrator
