= Associação Desportiva Vasco da Gama =

Brazilian football club

Vasco de Rio Branco
- Full name: Associação Desportiva Vasco da Gama
- Nickname: Bacalhau D'água Doce (Fresh water's codfish)
- Founded: 28 June 1952; 74 years ago
- Ground: Florestão
- Capacity: 10,000
- President: Renato Machado (Lobinho)
- Head coach: Lelão
- League: Campeonato Acreano
- 2025: Acreano, 3rd of 8
Home colours	Away colours

Associação Desportiva Vasco da Gama, commonly known as Vasco de Rio Branco, Vasco do Acre or Vasco da Gama, is a Brazilian football club based in Rio Branco, Acre. The club currently competes in Campenato Acreano, the top division of the Acre state football league.

Associação Desportiva Vasco da Gama's home kit is a white shirt with a black diagonal stripe from the top right corner of the shirt to the bottom left, black shorts and white socks. They play their home matches at the Estádio José de Melo which has a capacity of 8,000 and are currently playing in the Campeonato Acriano which they have won three times. Vasco competed twice in the Série C.

The club's name and team colors are adopted from the more famous Club de Regatas Vasco da Gama.

== History ==
Associação Desportiva Vasco da Gama was founded on 28 June 1952. They won the Campeonato Acriano in 1965, 1999 and 2001. The club participated in the Série C in 1995 and in 1999.

== Honours ==
- Campeonato Acreano
  - Winners (3): 1965, 1999, 2001
  - Runners-up (5): 1963, 1964, 1967, 2002, 2003
- Campeonato Acreano Segunda Divisão
  - Winners (1): 2013
  - Runners-up (1): 2012
- Torneio Início do Acre
  - Winners (1): 1974

== Stadium ==
Vasco plays its home games at Estádio José de Melo. The stadium has a maximum capacity of 8,000 people.
