= 2021 National League play-off final =

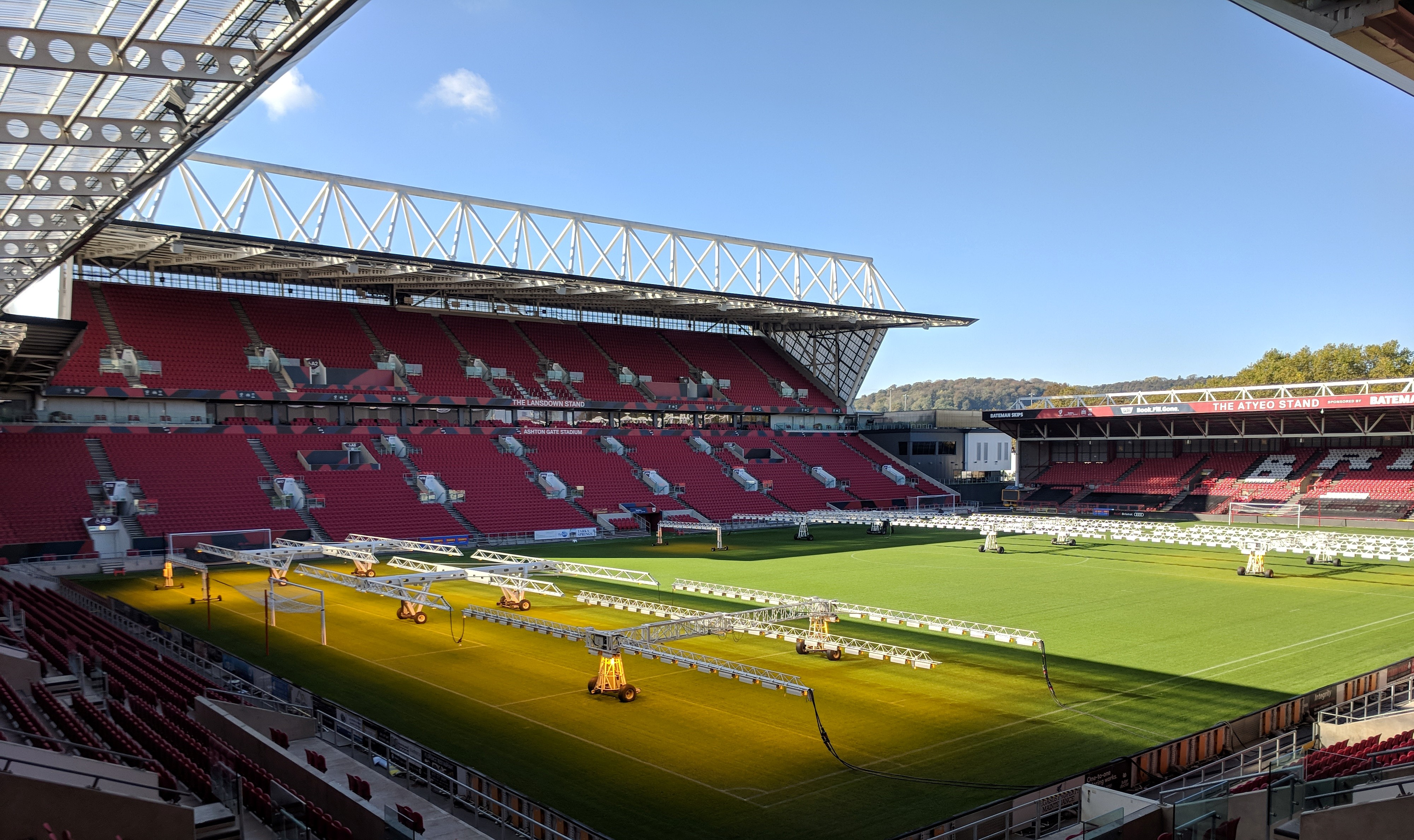
- The match took place at Ashton Gate Stadium.
- Event: 2020–21 National League
Torquay United	Hartlepool United
1	1
- After extra time Hartlepool United won 5–4 on penalties
- Date: 20 June 2021
- Venue: Ashton Gate Stadium, Bristol
- Referee: Simon Mather
- Attendance: 6,606
- Weather: Partially cloudy, 17 °C (63 °F)

The 2021 National League play-off final, known as the Vanarama National League Promotion Final for sponsorship reasons, was an association football match played on 20 June 2021 at the Ashton Gate Stadium in Bristol between Torquay United and Hartlepool United. It determined the second and final team to gain promotion from the National League, English football's fifth tier, to EFL League Two. The team that finished first in the 2020–21 National League gained automatic promotion to League Two, while the teams placed from second to seventh participated in the play-offs. Sutton United gained the only automatic promotion spot to League Two. The winners of the semi-finals competed for the final promotion spot for the 2021–22 EFL League Two. The losing play-off quarter-finalists were Chesterfield and Bromley. In the following round, Notts County and Stockport County were eliminated in the semi-finals.

The game, which was refereed by Simon Mather, was played on a partially cloudy day in front of a reduced crowd of 6,606. Hartlepool took the lead in the 35th minute through Luke Armstrong. Hartlepool managed to hold on to their lead until the 95th minute when Torquay's goalkeeper Lucas Covolan headed in an equaliser. The match remained 1–1 after extra time, meaning that penalties would determine the outcome of the game. Hartlepool won 5–4 on penalties after a miss by Torquay's Matt Buse, meaning that Hartlepool earned promotion to the 2021–22 EFL League Two. In previous years, Wembley Stadium had often been the venue for the National League play-off final, however, Ashton Gate was used instead to avoid clashes with UEFA Euro 2020 matches held at Wembley. Furthermore, due to the ongoing COVID-19 pandemic, the stadium's capacity for the match was reduced from 27,000 by approximately 75% to allow social distancing measures.

== Route to the final ==
National League final table, leading positions
Pos	Team	Pld	W	D	L	GF	GA	GD	Pts
1	Sutton United	42	25	9	8	72	36	+36	84
2	Torquay United	42	23	11	8	68	39	+29	80
3	Stockport County	42	21	14	7	69	32	+37	77
4	Hartlepool United	42	22	10	10	66	43	+23	76
5	Notts County	42	20	10	12	62	41	+21	70
6	Chesterfield	42	21	6	15	60	43	+17	69
7	Bromley	42	19	12	11	63	53	+10	69

Torquay United finished the regular 2020–21 season in second place in the National League, the fifth tier of the English football league system, two places ahead of their opponents Hartlepool United. Both therefore missed out on the only automatic promotion spot to EFL League Two and instead took part in the play-offs to determine the second team to be promoted. Torquay United finished four points behind Sutton United, whereas Hartlepool finished eight points behind the leaders.

Due to the layout of the play-offs, teams who finished in second and third automatically qualified for the play-off semi-finals. Therefore, Torquay automatically qualified for the play-off semi-final where they met fifth-place Notts County on 12 June 2021 at Plainmoor, Torquay. The Gulls took an early lead after 35 seconds via a header by Danny Wright. The Magpies equalised before half-time with a strong header by Rúben Rodrigues. Torquay retook the lead in the 48th minute with another goal via Wright with a right-footed strike from 12 yards out. Notts County then equalised for a second time only three minutes later after a corner dropped to the defender Adam Chicksen who fired into the top-left corner. After 90 minutes, the match remained level at 2–2 meaning that the match would continue into extra time. Torquay took the lead for the third time in the match by a header from Asa Hall via a corner kick. In added time in the first half of extra time, Torquay were awarded a controversial penalty. Dean Moxey stepped up to convert the penalty to guarantee Torquay's place in the play-off final by winning 4–2.

Hartlepool missed out on a top three spot on the final day of the season despite a 4–0 win against Weymouth, meaning that they would have to play an additional match. Therefore, Hartlepool met seventh place Bromley at Victoria Park, Hartlepool on 6 June 2021. Pools took the lead in the 17th minute after a long-ball by captain Nicky Featherstone from his own half. Top-scorer Rhys Oates managed to get to the ball before the opposition to make it 1–0. Three minutes later, Luke Armstrong doubled Hartlepool's lead after a cross from Oates. In the 24th minute, Oates scored a left-footed shot from just outside of the penalty area to make it 3–0. The second half was more even and Bromley reduced the deficit with a header from a corner by James Alabi in the 48th minute. Bromley scored a second goal from a long throw-in in the 93rd minute via defender Byron Webster. However, the goal was only a consolation as Hartlepool closed out the game to guarantee their spot in the semi-final.

This win against Bromley set up a semi-final match away at Stockport County on 13 June 2021 at Edgeley Park, Stockport. Stockport entered the game as strong favourites to win the play-off competition. The match ended up being a tight affair with few chances for either team. Hartlepool managed to take the lead in the 76th minute with a left-footed strike from outside of the penalty area by Oates. The match stayed this way meaning that Hartlepool ended County's 18 match unbeaten run to progress to the play-off final in Bristol.

=== Quarter-finals ===
5 June 2021	Notts County	3–2	Chesterfield	Meadow Lane, Nottingham
16:00	Wootton 30', 71'; Ellis 90'	Report	Rowe 27'; Mandeville 42'	Attendance: 4,569; Referee: Tom Reeves

6 June 2021	Hartlepool United	3–2	Bromley	Victoria Park, Hartlepool
14:30	Oates 17', 24'; Armstrong 20'	Report	Alabi 48'; Webster 90+3'	Attendance: 1,700; Referee: Lewis Smith

=== Semi-finals ===
12 June 2021	Torquay United	4–2 (a.e.t.)	Notts County	Plainmoor, Torquay
12:00	Wright 1', 48'; Hall 102'; Moxey 109' (pen.)	Report	Rodrigues 39'; Chicksen 51'	Attendance: 1,709; Referee: Andrew Kitchen

13 June 2021	Stockport County	0–1	Hartlepool United	Edgeley Park, Stockport
12:00		Report	Oates 76'	Attendance: 2,758; Referee: David Richardson

== Match ==
=== Background ===
The 2020–21 season was overshadowed by the coronavirus pandemic which had forced the cancellation of the preceding 2019–20 campaign in March 2020. The vast majority of fixtures were played behind closed doors to avoid transmission of COVID-19. As COVID-19 restrictions were relaxing, fans were allowed to return to stadiums at a reduced capacity. On 17 May 2021, Prime Minister Boris Johnson announced that stadium capacities would be limited to 25% to allow social distancing for the return of supporters. The normal capacity of Ashton Gate is 27,000 meaning that both clubs were allocated approximately 3,100 tickets each. In contrast to recent years where the final was contested at Wembley Stadium, the venue of Ashton Gate was selected to avoid clashes with UEFA Euro 2020 matches.

Torquay, who were managed by Gary Johnson, were in first place for the majority of the season. The Gulls went to the top of the league in October 2020 before losing top spot in March 2021. They briefly regained top spot in April and May 2021 also. Before the play-off semi-final, the Gulls were on an unbeaten run of 13 matches. Torquay had previously won one National League play-off final, by winning 2–0 against Cambridge United in 2009. Torquay were looking to return to the Football League for the first time since their relegation in 2014. Since this relegation, Torquay had mostly struggled in non-League and were relegated to the National League South in 2018. The Gulls returned to the fifth tier as champions at the first attempt and then finished in 14th place in 2019–20.

Hartlepool, who were managed by Dave Challinor, guaranteed their play-off spot with a 3–1 win at Aldershot Town on 15 May 2021. After an unbeaten run of 16 games between February and May, Hartlepool had an erratic end to the season by losing three of their final five fixtures to finish in fourth place. Since the last time Hartlepool experienced promotion in 2007, they had been relegated twice and only finished in the top half twice. Hartlepool were looking to return to the Football League which they joined in 1921 before being relegated from League Two in 2017. Prior to the match, Hartlepool had never been promoted via the play-offs in any division and had lost their only previous play-off final in 2005.

In the matches between the two clubs in the regular season, both teams won their away games. In October 2020, Torquay defeated Hartlepool 5–0 at Victoria Park, live on BT Sport. However, Hartlepool picked up three points by winning 1–0 at Plainmoor in March 2021. Hartlepool's top scorer going into the final was Rhys Oates with 14 goals in the regular season before he scored an additional three goals during the play-off campaign. Torquay's top scorer was midfielder Asa Hall with 12 league goals. Before the match, Hartlepool were regarded as marginal favourites to win the Final by the bookmakers.

The match was broadcast live on BT Sport 1 with coverage starting at 13:00.

=== First half ===
The match kicked off at 14:00. Eight minutes into the match, Torquay seemed to have taken the lead through Kyle Cameron, however, Pools goalkeeper Brad James was deemed to have been impeded. The decision to disallow the goal after a foul on Hartlepool's goalkeeper was a controversial one and was disputed by Torquay. Subsequently, Pools' top goalscorer, Oates – was a catalyst, by driving forward and troubling Lucas Covolan with a low shot that proved awkward for the goalkeeper. Armstrong almost scored when connecting with Gavan Holohan's effort, but the Gulls managed to clear only for the Salford loanee to come close again with a header that Covolan managed to save. In the 36th minute, Armstrong did open the scoring for Pools, collecting Oates' rebound effort and hitting a shot off the crossbar. In the 43rd minute, both sets of fans joined in a round of applause in memory of Hartlepool fan Danny Shurmer who had died in the previous week at the age of 43. Just before half time, Torquay nearly conceded a second after Oates had found himself unmarked from a corner, his headed effort was pushed over by the goalkeeper and the half ended with Pools leading 1–0.

=== Second half ===
Early in the second half, Cameron had a second goal disallowed by the referee after another foul on James. Late on, Hartlepool nearly scored two more goals via Mark Shelton and Holohan, however, both shots were blocked by Torquay defenders. In the final moments Torquay maintained pressure on their opponents and substitute Billy Waters failed to convert a shot late on. In the fifth minute of injury time, Torquay's goalkeeper Covolan was allowed to go into the Pools box for a Torquay corner, which was cleared, but when the ball was crossed forward from the right, Covolan beat James to the ball, stunning Pools and forcing them to play an additional 30 minutes.

=== Extra-time ===
Waters had two efforts blocked as Torquay dominated the early stages of the first period of extra time. Jake Andrews of Torquay was stretchered off with an injury which allowed a previously deflated Hartlepool to regain some momentum. Pools had a penalty appeal turned down in the first half and pushed for a winner via Danny Elliott in the second half of extra time. Nevertheless, both sides had to settle for a penalty shootout to decide the winner. In the resulting penalty shootout, both sides missed their first two penalties. All subsequent penalties were converted, forcing the shootout into sudden death. Club captain Ryan Donaldson converted his penalty to make it 5–4 to Hartlepool before Matt Buse took his penalty. His effort was saved onto the bar by James, marking Hartlepool's promotion to the Football League.

=== Details ===
20 June 2021
14:00 BST

Torquay United	1–1 (a.e.t.)	Hartlepool United
Covolan 90+5'	Report	Armstrong 35'
Penalties
Waters (penalty missed); Wright (penalty missed); Hall (penalty scored); Lewis (penalty scored); Little (penalty scored); Lemonheigh-Evans (penalty scored); Buse (penalty missed)	4–5	(penalty missed) Featherstone; (penalty missed) Armstrong; (penalty scored) Shelton; (penalty scored) Sterry; (penalty scored) Molyneux; (penalty scored) Elliott; (penalty scored) Donaldson

Ashton Gate Stadium, Bristol
Attendance: 6,606
Referee: Simon Mather

Torquay United	Hartlepool United

GK	33	Lucas Covolan
RB	2	Ben Wynter
CB	16	Sam Sherring
CB	31	Joe Lewis
LB	21	Dean Moxey	(substituted off) 84'
RM	7	Connor Lemonheigh-Evans
CM	8	Asa Hall
CM	10	Armani Little
LM	4	Kyle Cameron (c)	(substituted off) 77'
CF	9	Danny Wright
CF	12	Adam Randell	(substituted off) 89'
Substitutes:
GK	1	Shaun MacDonald
MF	11	Jake Andrews	(substituted on) 84' (substituted off) 105'
MF	15	Matt Buse	(substituted on) 105'
FW	25	Billy Waters	(substituted on) 89'
FW	28	Benjamin Mbunga-Kimpioka	(substituted on) 77'
Manager:
Gary Johnson

GK	13	Bradley James
RB	23	Jamie Sterry
CB	5	Timi Odusina	(substituted off) 120+1'
CB	4	Gary Liddle
CB	15	Ryan Johnson
LB	3	David Ferguson	(substituted off) 76'
CM	6	Mark Shelton
CM	8	Nicky Featherstone (c)
CM	14	Gavan Holohan	(substituted off) 90+2'
CF	29	Luke Armstrong
CF	11	Rhys Oates	(substituted off) 72'
Substitutes:
GK	1	Ben Killip
DF	26	Zaine Francis-Angol	(substituted on) 76'
MF	7	Ryan Donaldson	(substituted on) 90+2'
MF	10	Luke Molyneux	(substituted on) 120+1'
FW	27	Danny Elliott	(substituted on) 72'
Manager:
Dave Challinor

=== Post-match ===
Gary Johnson said: "Lucas (Covolan) could have been, and was, our hero, saving two penalties and obviously scoring his goal. Unfortunately his team-mates missed three penalties and you're not going to win a final if you miss three penalties. It's disappointing because we thought we might have had two goals during the game which would have put us clear. I've asked the referee to come back to me and have a look at the video and let me know if he still thinks they're fouls for the goals, but I've been around a long time and a thousand times I've asked that over the seasons and never has a referee come back to me and said 'sorry about that'."

Dave Challinor said: "It feels amazing, absolutely amazing. You come into these play-off scenarios knowing that it could be a bit of a lottery and I suppose that game was the ultimate lottery. When our best two penalty-takers miss and their best two penalty-takers miss you start questioning what's going on a little bit. But I'm massively delighted and made up for the players. This is a group of lads who back in June when we came back were trialists, were lads who'd been discarded from other clubs, and we spoke about giving them a platform to perform. The group now has a chance of staying together because our scenario as a football club is massively different between being a National League club and Football League club. There's been a lift of positivity around the football club, stuff off the field is looking good, and being in the Football League will only aid that process."

It was Hartlepool's first promotion for 14 years since they were guided into the 2007–08 Football League One by Danny Wilson. The team celebrated the promotion back to the Football League with their fans through an open-top bus tour of Hartlepool on 25 June 2021.

In the following 2021–22 season, Torquay were led to an eleventh placed finish in the National League under Gary Johnson, four places and eight points below the play-off positions. In 2021–22, Hartlepool finished in seventeenth place, sixteen points clear of the relegation zone. Simultaneously, Pools managed to maintain two good cup runs. They reached a joint record fourth round of the FA Cup after defeating Championship side Blackpool before losing 2–0 to Premier League side Crystal Palace. Hartlepool also reached the semi-final of the 2021–22 EFL Trophy for the first time before losing to Rotherham United on penalties. In November 2021, Hartlepool's manager Dave Challinor decided to join National League side Stockport County despite having signed a three-year contract in September 2021. At the end of the 2022–23 season, Hartlepool were relegated back to the National League after two seasons in the Football League. Torquay were also relegated in the 2022–23 season, returning to the National League South.
