= Alto Acre Futebol Club =

Brazilian football club

Alto Acre
- Full name: Alto Acre Futebol Club
- Nickname(s): Papagaio da Fronteira
- Founded: 31 March 2009; 15 years ago
- Ground: Arena Acreana
- Capacity: 20,000
- 2017: Acreano, 8th of 8 (relegated)
Home colors	Away colors

Alto Acre Futebol Club, commonly known as Alto Acre, is a Brazilian association football club based in Epitaciolândia, Acre. The club currently doesn't play in any league, having last participated in the Campeonato Acreano in the 2017 season.

== History ==
The club was founded on 31 March 2009. They competed in the Campeonato Acreano in 2010, when they were finished in the fifth position.

== Stadium ==
Alto Acre Futebol Club play their home games at Estádio Antônio Araújo Lopes. The stadium has a maximum capacity of 3,500 people.
