= Estádio José de Melo =

Stadium in Rio Branco

Coordinates: 9°58′13″S 67°48′27″W

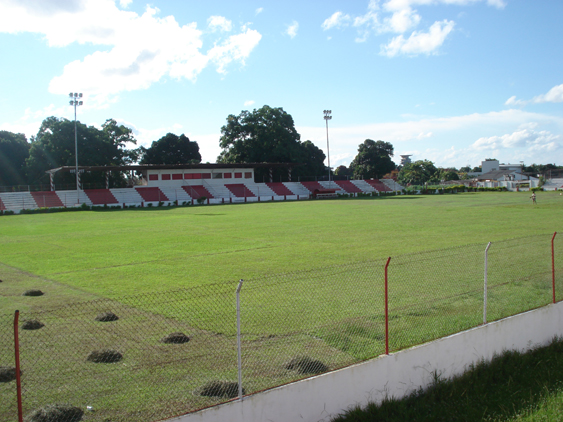
- Interactive map of Estádio José de Melo
- Full name: Estádio José de Melo
- Location: Rio Branco, Acre Brazil
- Owner: Rio Branco Football Club
- Capacity: 2,000
- Surface: Grass

Construction
- Built: 1929
- Opened: 1935

Estádio José de Melo, sometimes called Stadium José de Melo, is a multi-use stadium located in Rio Branco, Brazil. It is used mostly for football matches and as the training ground of Rio Branco Football Club. The stadium has a maximum capacity of 2,000 people and was built in 1929 (according to some sources, it was inaugurated in 1935). The stadium is owned by Rio Branco Football Club and is named after the commissioner José Francisco de Melo, who is a former player and former president of Rio Branco Football Club. He also donated the groundplot where the stadium was built.

Most Campeonato Acriano matches were formerly held at Estádio José de Melo.

== History ==
It was built in 1935, and inaugurated on June 8 of that year.

The stadium's attendance record currently stands at 5,476, set on April 11, 1995, when Corinthians beat Rio Branco 3–0.
