= Campeonato Acreano =

Football league of Acre, Brazil

- Organising body: FFA
- Founded: 1919; 107 years ago (as an amateur Liga Acreana and later with different amateur leagues); 1989; 37 years ago (as the professional Campeonato Acreano)
- Country: Brazil
- State: (Acre (state)) Acre
- Level on pyramid: 1
- Relegation to: Campeonato Acreano Second Division
- Domestic cup(s): Copa Verde; Copa do Brasil
- Current champions: Santa Cruz (1st) (2026)
- Most championships: Rio Branco (49 titles)
- Website: FFA Official website
- Current: 2026 Campeonato Acreano

The Campeonato Acreano (sometimes referred as Campeonato Acriano) is the top-flight professional state football league in the Brazilian state of Acre. It is run by the Acre Football Federation (FFA).

== List of champions ==
Following is the list with all Campeonato Acreano editions:

=== Amateur era ===
==== Liga Acreana de Esportes Terrestres ====
Season	Champions
1919	Rio Branco (1)
1920	Ypiranga (1)
1921	Rio Branco (2)
1922–1927	Not Held
1928	Rio Branco (3)
1929	Rio Branco (4)
1930	AA Militar (1)
1931–1934	Not Held
1935	Rio Branco (5)
1936	Rio Branco (6)
1937	Rio Branco (7)
1938	Rio Branco (8)
1939	Rio Branco (9)
1940	Rio Branco (10)
1941	Rio Branco (11)
1942	Duque de Caxias (1)
1943	Rio Branco (12)
1944	Rio Branco (13)
1945	Rio Branco (14)
1946	Rio Branco (15)

==== Federação Acreana de Desportos ====
Season	Champions	Runners-up
1947	Rio Branco (16)	Fortaleza
1948	América (1)	Rio Branco
1949	América (2)	Rio Branco
1950	Rio Branco (17)	Independência
1951	Rio Branco (18)	América
1952	Atlético Acreano (1)	Rio Branco
1953	Atlético Acreano (2)	Rio Branco
1954	Independência (1)	Rio Branco
1955	Rio Branco (19)	Independência
1956	Rio Branco (20)	Independência
1957	Rio Branco (21)	Independência
1958	Independência (2)	Rio Branco
1959	Independência (3)	Rio Branco
1960	Rio Branco (22)	Independência
1961	Rio Branco (23)	Atlético Acreano
1962	Rio Branco (24)	Atlético Acreano

==== Federação Acreana de Desportos (as a federal unit) ====
Season	Champions	Runners-up
1962	Atlético Acreano (3)	Rio Branco
1963	Independência (4)	Rio Branco
1964	Rio Branco (25)	Independência
1965	Vasco da Gama (1)	Rio Branco
1966	Juventus (1)	Independência
1967	Grêmio Sampaio (1)	Vasco da Gama
1968	Atlético Acreano (4)	Juventus
1969	Juventus (2)	Independência
1970	Independência (5)	Juventus
1971	Rio Branco (26)	Independência
1972	Independência (6)	Juventus
1973	Rio Branco (27)	Internacional
1974	Independência (7)	Juventus
1975	Juventus (3)	Rio Branco
1976	Juventus (4)	Rio Branco
1977	Rio Branco (28)	Vasco da Gama
1978	Juventus (5)	Atlético Acreano
1979	Rio Branco (29)	Juventus
1980	Juventus (6)	Independência
1981	Juventus (7)	Atlético Acreano
1982	Juventus (8)	Rio Branco
1983	Rio Branco (30)	Atlético Acreano
1984	Juventus (9)	Rio Branco
1985	Independência (8)	Juventus
1986	Rio Branco (31)	Juventus
1987	Atlético Acreano (5)	Juventus
1988	Independência (9)	Rio Branco

=== Professional era ===
==== Federação de Futebol do Estado do Acre ====
Season	Champions	Runners-up
1989	Juventus (10)	Atlético Acreano
1990	Juventus (11)	Rio Branco
1991	Atlético Acreano (6)	Juventus
1992	Rio Branco (32)	Independência
1993	Independência (10)	ADESG
1994	Rio Branco (33)	Juventus
1995	Juventus (12)	Rio Branco
1996	Juventus (13)	Rio Branco
1997	Rio Branco (34)	Independência
1998	Independência (11)	Rio Branco
1999	Vasco da Gama (2)	Independência

==== Federação de Futebol do Acre ====
Season	Champions	Runners-up
2000	Rio Branco (35)	Independência
2001	Vasco da Gama (3)	Rio Branco
2002	Rio Branco (36)	Vasco da Gama
2003	Rio Branco (37)	Vasco da Gama
2004	Rio Branco (38)	Juventus
2005	Rio Branco (39)	ADESG
2006	ADESG (1)	Rio Branco
2007	Rio Branco (40)	Andirá
2008	Rio Branco (41)	Juventus
2009	Juventus (14)	Rio Branco
2010	Rio Branco (42)	Náuas
2011	Rio Branco (43)	Plácido de Castro
2012	Rio Branco (44)	Atlético Acreano
2013	Plácido de Castro (1)	Rio Branco
2014	Rio Branco (45)	Atlético Acreano
2015	Rio Branco (46)	Galvez
2016	Atlético Acreano (7)	Rio Branco
2017	Atlético Acreano (8)	Rio Branco
2018	Rio Branco (47)	Galvez
2019	Atlético Acreano (9)	Galvez
2020	Galvez (1)	Atlético Acreano
2021	Rio Branco (48)	Humaitá
2022	Humaitá (1)	São Francisco
2023	Rio Branco (49)	Humaitá
2024	Independência (12)	Humaitá
2025	Independência (13)	Galvez
2026	Santa Cruz (1)	Rio Branco

== Titles by team ==
Teams in bold stills active.

Rank	Club	Winners	Winning years
1	**Rio Branco**	49	1919, 1921, 1928, 1929, 1935, 1936, 1937, 1938, 1939, 1940, 1941, 1943, 1944, 1945, 1946, 1947, 1950, 1951, 1955, 1956, 1957, 1960, 1961, 1962 (Territorial), 1964, 1971, 1973, 1977, 1979, 1983, 1986, 1992, 1994, 1997, 2000, 2002, 2003, 2004, 2005, 2007, 2008, 2010, 2011, 2012, 2014, 2015, 2018, 2021, 2023
2	Juventus	14	1966, 1969, 1975, 1976, 1978, 1980, 1981, 1982, 1984, 1989, 1990, 1995, 1996, 2009
3	**Independência**	13	1954, 1958, 1959, 1963, 1970, 1972, 1974, 1985, 1988, 1993, 1998, 2024, 2025
4	**Atlético Acreano**	9	1952, 1953, 1962 (State), 1968, 1987, 1991, 2016, 2017, 2019
5	**Vasco da Gama**	3	1965, 1999, 2001
6	América	2	1948, 1949
7	**ADESG**	1	2006
7	Duque de Caxias	1	1942
7	**Galvez**	1	2020
7	Grêmio Sampaio	1	1967
7	**Humaitá**	1	2022
7	AA Militar	1	1930
7	**Plácido de Castro**	1	2013
7	Ypiranga	1	1920
7	**Santa Cruz**	1	2026

=== By city ===
City	Championships	Clubs
Rio Branco	96	Rio Branco (49), Juventus (14), Independência (13), Atlético Acreano (9), Vasco da Gama (3), América (2), Duque de Caxias (1), Galvez (1), Grêmio Sampaio (1), AA Militar (1), Santa Cruz (1), Ypiranga (1)
Plácido de Castro	1	Plácido de Castro
Porto Acre	1	Humaitá
Senador Guiomard	1	ADESG
