= Atlético Clube Juventus =

Brazilian football club

Juventus do Acre
- Full name: Atlético Clube Juventus
- Nickname: Clube do Povo (People's Club)
- Founded: 1 March 1966; 60 years ago
- Ground: Arena da Floresta
- Capacity: 20,000
- President: Farney Correia Lima
- 2013: Acreano, 5th
Home colours	Away colours

Atlético Clube Juventus, commonly known as Juventus do Acre, is a Brazilian association football club based in Rio Branco, Acre. The club currently doesn't play in any league, having last participated in the Campeonato Acreano in the 2013 season.

Atlético Clube Juventus's home kit is a maroon shirt, black shorts and black socks. The club's mascot is an eagle and they play their home games at the Dom Giocondo Maria Grotti Stadium which has a capacity of 4,000.

== History ==
Atlético Clube Juventus was founded on March 1, 1966, by Elias Mansour Simão Filho, José Aníbal Tinôco, father Antônio Aneri, Dinah Gadelha Dias, Valter Félix de Souza and Iolanda Souza e Silva. The club is named after the Italian club, after a suggestion by the father Antônio Aneri, because at that time it was the most traditional football team in his home country.

== Honours ==
=== Regional ===
- Torneio de Integração da Amazônia
  - Winners (2): 1981, 1982

=== State ===
- Campeonato Acreano
  - Winners (14): 1966, 1969, 1975, 1976, 1978, 1980, 1981, 1982, 1984, 1989, 1990, 1995, 1996, 2009
  - Runners-up (11): 1968, 1970, 1972, 1979, 1985, 1986, 1987, 1991, 1994, 2004, 2008
- Torneio Início do Acre
  - Winners (10): 1967, 1969, 1973, 1976, 1979, 1984, 1988, 1989, 2003, 2012
