= Arena da Floresta =

Multi-use stadium in Acre, Brazil

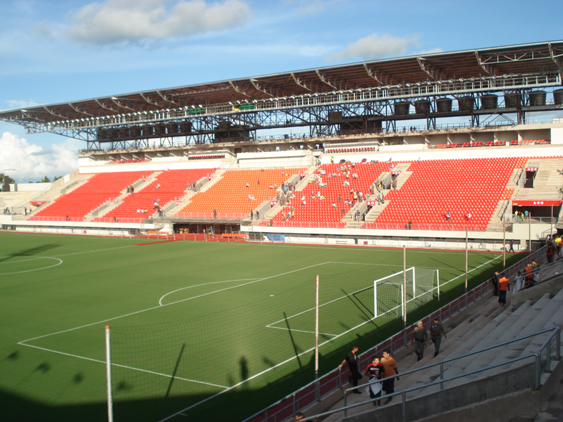
- Sisbrace
- Interactive map of Arena da Floresta
- Full name: Arena da Floresta
- Location: Rio Branco, Acre, Brazil
- Coordinates: 10°00′08″S 67°48′14″W
- Owner: State of Acre
- Capacity: 13,700 (limited capacity); 20,000 (maximum)
- Surface: Grass
- Field size: 100 m x 75 m

Construction
- Opened: December 17, 2006

Tenants
- Rio Branco; Atlético Acreano; Galvez; Humaitá; Andirá

Arena da Floresta is a multi-use stadium in Rio Branco, Acre, Brazil. It is currently used mostly for football matches. The stadium holds 13,534. It was built in 2006, eyeing a possible use for the 2014 FIFA World Cup. Originally, its venue was meant to hold 40,000 spectators, but local conditions halved the figure to 20,000.

== History ==
The stadium, built in 2006, was inaugurated on December 17 of that year, when Rio Branco-AC beat Brazil national under-20 football team 2–1. The stadium's attendance record currently stands at 23,000, set on that match.
