= Náuas Esporte Clube =

Náuas
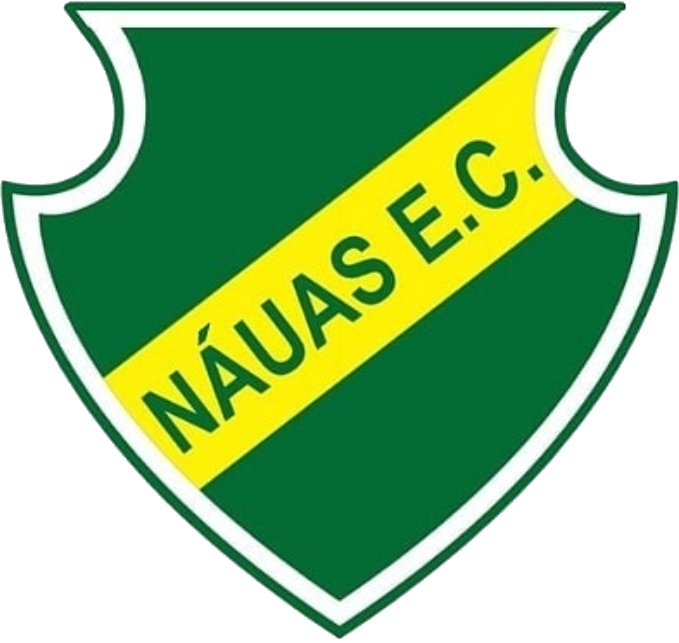
- Full name: Náuas Esporte Clube
- Nickname(s): Cacique do Juruá (Cacique of Juruá)
- Founded: 19 October 1923; 101 years ago
- Ground: Arena do Juruá
- Capacity: 4,000
- President: Zacarias Lopes
- Head coach: Mauro de Lazzari
- League: Campeonato Acreano Segunda Divisão
- 2024: Acreano, 10th of 11 (relegated)
Home colours	Away colours

Náuas Esporte Clube, commonly known as Náuas, is a Brazilian football club based in Cruzeiro do Sul, Acre. The club currently competes in Campenato Acreano, the top division of the Acre state football league.

== History ==
The club was founded on 19 October 1923. They competed in the Série D in 2010, when they were eliminated in the First Stage.

== Honours ==
- Campeonato Acreano
  - Runners-up (1): 2010
- Campeonato Acreano Segunda Divisão
  - Runners-up (1): 2018

== Stadium ==
Náuas Esporte Clube play their home games at Complexo Esportivo Totão. The stadium has a maximum capacity of 9,000 people.
