= Plácido de Castro Futebol Club =

Plácido de Castro
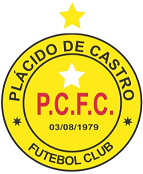
- Full name: Plácido de Castro Futebol Club
- Nickname(s): Tigre do Abunã (Tiger of the Abuna)
- Founded: 3 November 1979; 45 years ago
- Ground: Ferreirão
- Capacity: 1,200
- President: Renato Garcia
- Head coach: Radson Júnior
- League: Campeonato Acreano
- 2024: Acreano, 8th of 11
| Home colours | Away colours |

Plácido de Castro Futebol Club, commonly known as Plácido de Castro, is a Brazilian football club based in Plácido de Castro, Acre. The club currently competes in Campenato Acreano, the top division of the Acre state football league.

Rio Branco is currently ranked fourth among Acre teams in CBF's national club ranking, at 205th place overall.

== History ==
The club was founded on 3 November 1979. The club finished in the third position in the Campeonato Acriano in 2008. They competed in the Série D in 2011. Plácido de Castro won the Campeonato Acriano in 2013.

== Honours ==
- Campeonato Acreano
  - Winners (1): 2013
  - Runners-up (1): 2011

== Stadium ==
Plácido de Castro Futebol Club play their home games at Estádio Municipal José Ferreira Lima. The stadium has a maximum capacity of 3,000 people.
