= Atlético Acreano =

Brazilian association football club based in Rio Branco, Acre, Brazil

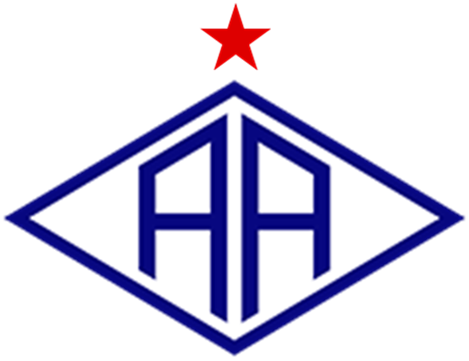
- Full name: Atlético Acreano
- Nicknames: Galo Carijó (Carijó Rooster); Alviceleste (White and Sky Blue)
- Founded: 27 April 1952; 74 years ago
- Ground: Florestão; Arena da Floresta
- Capacity: 8,000; 20,000
- President: Elison Azevedo
- Head coach: Zé Marco
- League: Campeonato Acreano Série B
- 2025: Acreano, 3rd of 6
Home colours	Away colours	Third colours

Atlético Acreano is a Brazilian professional football club based in Rio Branco, Acre founded on 27 April 1952. It competes in the Campeonato Acreano, the top flight of the Acre state football league.

Atlético is the top ranked team from Acre in CBF's national club ranking, at 68th overall.

== History ==
The club was founded in 1952, under the name "Beirut" for Syrian-Lebanese traders. Among them are Augusto Hidalgo de Lima, Foch Jardim, Roberto Sanches Mubárac, Lourival Pinho, Pereira de Lima, Goldwasser Pereira Santos, Sílvio Ferrante, Mário D'Avila Maciel, Rufino Farias Vieira, Fernando Andrade Pessoa, among others.

Several other families had an important passage and that are parts of the club's history, such as Diógenes, Pinho, Ribeiro, Frota, and Patriota.

With great values, Atlético Acreano began to dominate the Segundo Distrito. The passion that the blue and white team caused, soon received the slogan "Glória de um Povo, orgulho de Uma Cidade". (The glory of a people, proud of a city).

== Honours ==
=== Official tournaments ===
State
Competitions	Titles	Seasons
Campeonato Acreano	9	1952, 1953, 1962 (state), 1968, 1987, 1991, 2016, 2017, 2019
Campeonato Acreano Série B	1	2026

=== Others tournaments ===
==== State ====
- Torneio Início do Acre (10): 1955, 1957, 1960, 1970, 1978, 1987, 1992, 1993, 2002, 2011

=== Runners-up ===
- Campeonato Acreano (10): 1961, 1962, 1976, 1977, 1981, 1983, 1990, 2012, 2014, 2020

=== Women's Football ===
- Campeonato Acreano de Futebol Feminino (5): 2015, 2017, 2018, 2019, 2023

== Rivalries ==
Atlético's rivals are Rio Branco and Juventus.
