= Plácido de Castro, Acre =

Municipality of Acre, Brazil

Plácido de Castro
- Municipality
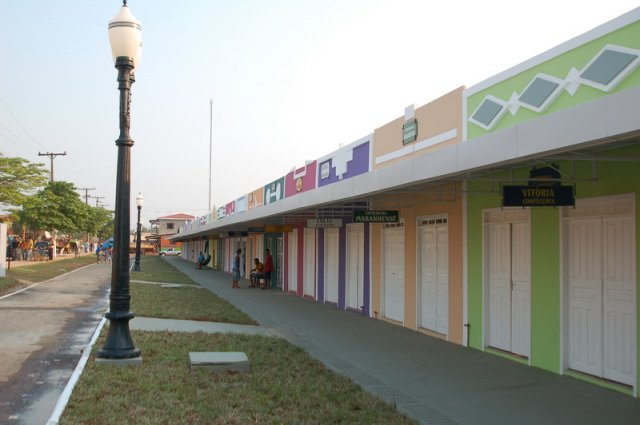
- Street scene

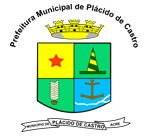
- Flag Coat of arms

- Location of municipality in Acre State
- Coordinates: 10°16′33″S 67°09′00″W
- Country: Brazil
- State: Acre

Government
  - Mayor: Camilo da Silva (PSD-AC)

Area
  - Total: 790 sq mi (2,047 km^{2})

Population (2020 est)
  - Total: 19,955
- Time zone: UTC−5 (ACT)
- Website: http://www.placidodecastro.ac.cnm.org.br/

Plácido de Castro (Brazilian Portuguese pronunciation: [ˈplasidu dʒi ˈkastɾu]) is a municipality located in the east of the Brazilian state of Acre on the border with Bolivia.

== Geography ==
The municipal seat is on the left bank of the Abunã River, which defines the boundary between Brazil and Bolivia. It is 95 kilometres (59 mi) from Rio Branco by road, or 80 kilometres (50 mi) as the crow flies, accessible to weekend tourists from the city via the AC-40 highway. It has an area of 1,945 square kilometres (751 sq mi), and is the 19th largest in area in Acre. The municipality is bounded to the north and northwest by the municipality of Senador Guiomard, to the east by the municipality of Acrelândia, to the south by Bolivia and to the west by the municipality of Capixaba. The municipality contains the Plácido de Castro Ecological Park, a 34-hectare (84-acre) municipal conservation area that contains 113 genera of trees. An area that held large trees such as Brazil nut, rubber, cocoa and mahogany was destroyed by fire in 2005.

The surrounding area has several large, ancient earthworks termed "geoglifos" by regional archaeologists. An example is clearly visible in aerial photography at 10.307°S 67.218°W.

== History ==
In the early 20th century the region of the present municipality was a place where fugitives from the law took refuge. José Plácido de Castro, who was prefect of the Alto Acre department in 1906–07, recommended the need for a settlement to stabilise the situation. In 1922 a trading post was established, serving extractors of nuts and rubber in the Abunã River basin. The post was in a rubber tappers' settlement named Pacatuba on the São Gabriel rubber estate, which was soon renamed after Plácido de Castro, a hero of the Acre War.

The Plácido de Castro District is shown as part of the Rio Branco municipality in the divisions of 31 December 1936 and 1 July 1960. The town did not develop until the 1940s and 1950s with the opening of the present road that links the city of Rio Branco to the towns of Quinari (Senador Guiomard) and Plácido de Castro. The municipality of Plácido de Castro was created on 10 March 1963.

== People and economy ==
The 2010 census gave the population as 17,209, of which 8,999 were men and 8,210 women. 12,384 were literate. 6,787 were Roman Catholic and 5,134 were Evangelical Christians. The Human Development Index as of 2010 was 0.622. In 2015 there were 3,260 elementary school pupils and 776 secondary school pupils. Estimated population as of 2016 was 18,159.

The municipality is the 8th largest in Acre by population, with a population density of 8.87 inhabitants per square kilometre. The local economy is based on beef and dairy cattle, saw mills, furniture manufacture, tourism, agriculture and extraction, particularly Brazil nuts. The neighbouring Bolivian village of Vila Montevidéu had a free trade zone for imported goods that was much visited by Brazilians. The village was burned in a major fire in 2007 and was rebuilt on a nearby site with the new name of Vila Evo Morales. The name honours President Evo Morales of Bolivia, who sent aid for reconstruction and was the first Bolivian president to visit the village.

== Sources ==
- Acre » Plácido de Castro (in Portuguese), IBGE: Instituto Brasileiro de Geografia e Estatística
- Plácido de Castro (in Portuguese), Governo do Estado do Acre
- Teixeira, Wenceslau Geraldes; Schaan, Denise Pahl; Shinzato, Edgar; Barbosa, Antônia Damasceno; Rebellato, Lilian; Woods, William (2015), "13 Feições geomorfológicas e solos nos locais em que foram construídos os geoglifos no Estado do Acre" (PDF), Geodiversidade do Estado do Acre (in Portuguese), Porto Velho, Brasil: Ministério de minas e energia: secretaria de geologia, mineração e transformação mineral
