= Rio Branco Football Club =

Association football club based in Rio Branco, Acre, Brazil

Rio Branco
- Full name: Rio Branco Football Club
- Nicknames: Estrelão (Big Star); Alvirrubro (White and Red); O Mais Querido (The Most Beloved)
- Founded: 8 June 1919; 107 years ago
- Ground: Arena da Floresta
- Capacity: 20,000
- President: Valdemar Neto
- Head coach: Daniel Pereira
- League: Campeonato Acreano
- 2025: Acreano, 6th of 8
Home colors	Away colors

Rio Branco Football Club, commonly referred to as Rio Branco, is a Brazilian professional club based in Rio Branco, Acre founded on 8 June 1919. It competes in the Campeonato Acreano, the top flight of the Acre state football league.

It is the most successful club in Acre, having won a record 47 state titles, 31 of those being won in the amateur era. Rio Branco also took part in the national league in 21 seasons, the most of any club from the state. It is also the first Northern Brazil and the only club from Acre to play in a continental cup, featuring in the 1997 Copa CONMEBOL after winning the Copa Norte in the same year.

Rio Branco's highest national league finish was achieved in 1989, when they finished 16th in the Brazilian Série B. The club's home colours are red and white and the team mascot is the Altaneira star, a symbol from the Acre state flag.

Rio Branco is currently ranked third among Acre teams in CBF's national club ranking, at 98th place overall.

== History ==
On June 8, 1919, the club was founded by the lawyer Luiz Mestrinho Filho, a relative of Governor Gilberto Mestrinho.

In 1947, the club won the first state championship organized by the Acre State Football Federation. From 1955 to 1957, Rio Branco won three state championships in a row.

Rio Branco won the first edition of Copa Norte in 1997, beating Remo of Pará state, in the final. Rio Branco gained the right to compete in that year's Copa CONMEBOL. The club was eliminated in the first round of Copa CONMEBOL, by Deportes Tolima, of Colombia, after losing in the penalty shootout. From 2002 to 2005, Rio Branco won four state championships in a row.

== Season records ==
Season	League										Campeonato Brasileiro									Copa do Brasil
Season	Division	Format	P	W	D	L	F	A	Pts	Pos	Division	P	W	D	L	F	A	Pts	Pos	Copa do Brasil
1999	A	^{(g6*,g6*)-2}	10	6	1	3			19	3rd										
2000	A	^{(g6*,g6*)-2}	12	8	3	0			27	1st	Green; Modul	12	5	3	4	20	16	18		
2001	A	^{(g6*,g6*)-2}	12	6	2	3	29	11	20	2nd										
2002	A	^{g6}	10	9	0	1	27	4	27	1st										
2003	A	^{(g7*,g7*)-2}	12	10	2	0			32	1st	C								R32	
2004	A		14	9	2	3			29	1st	C								QF	2nd round
2005	A	^{(g5*,g5*)-2}	13	9	3	1			30	1st										1st round
2006	A	Tacas	10	6	1	3	19	12	19	2nd	withdrew									1st round
2007	A	^{(g7*;g7*)-2}	12	10	2	0	47	11	32	1st	C	6	3	1	2	9	7	10	3rd(R16)	not qualified
2008	A	^{(g8*;g6*)-2}	13	12	0	1	42	15	36	1st	C	14	5	1	8	25	30	16	8th(R8)	1st round
2009	A	^{2g5*-4-2*}	6	4	2	0	16	7	14	2nd	C	10	4	2	4	18	15	14	QF	1st round
2010	A	^{g9*-4}	13	11	1	1	40	17	34	1st	C	8	2	4	2	12	17	10	4th(GS)	not qualified
2011	A	^{g8-4}	18	12	2	4	42	22	38	1st	C									1st round

== Stadium ==
Rio Branco currently plays in their home stadium, the Estádio José de Melo, which has a maximum capacity of 8,000 people.

The club also plays at Arena da Floresta, which has a maximum capacity of 20,000 people.

== Colors ==
Rio Branco's official colors are red and white. Rio Branco's home kit is composed of a red shirt, red shorts and red socks.

== Notable players ==
- Doka Madureira
- Testinha

== Honours ==
=== Official tournaments ===
Regional
Competitions	Titles	Seasons
Copa Norte	1	1997
Torneio de Integração da Amazônia	3	1976, 1979, 1984
State
Competitions	Titles	Seasons
Campeonato Acreano	49	1919, 1921, 1928, 1929, 1935, 1936, 1937, 1938, 1939, 1940, 1941, 1943, 1944, 1945, 1946, 1947, 1950, 1951, 1955, 1956, 1957, 1960, 1961, 1962 (Territorial), 1964, 1971, 1973, 1977, 1979, 1983, 1986, 1992, 1994, 1997, 2000, 2002, 2003, 2004, 2005, 2007, 2008, 2010, 2011, 2012, 2014, 2015, 2018, 2021, 2023

- record

=== Others tournaments ===
==== State ====
- Torneio Início do Acre (15): 1921, 1922, 1946, 1948, 1950, 1951, 1971, 1982, 1986, 1990, 1995, 1999, 2006, 2007, 2013

=== Runners-up ===
- Campeonato Acreano (24): 1942, 1948, 1949, 1952, 1954, 1958, 1959, 1962*, 1965, 1974, 1975, 1978, 1988, 1989, 1995, 1996, 1998, 2001, 2006, 2009, 2013, 2016, 2017

=== Women's Football ===
- Campeonato Acreano de Futebol Feminino (1): 2021
