= Rio Branco, Acre =

Capital city of Acre, Brazil

Rio Branco
- Municipality
- Município de Rio Branco; Municipality of Rio Branco
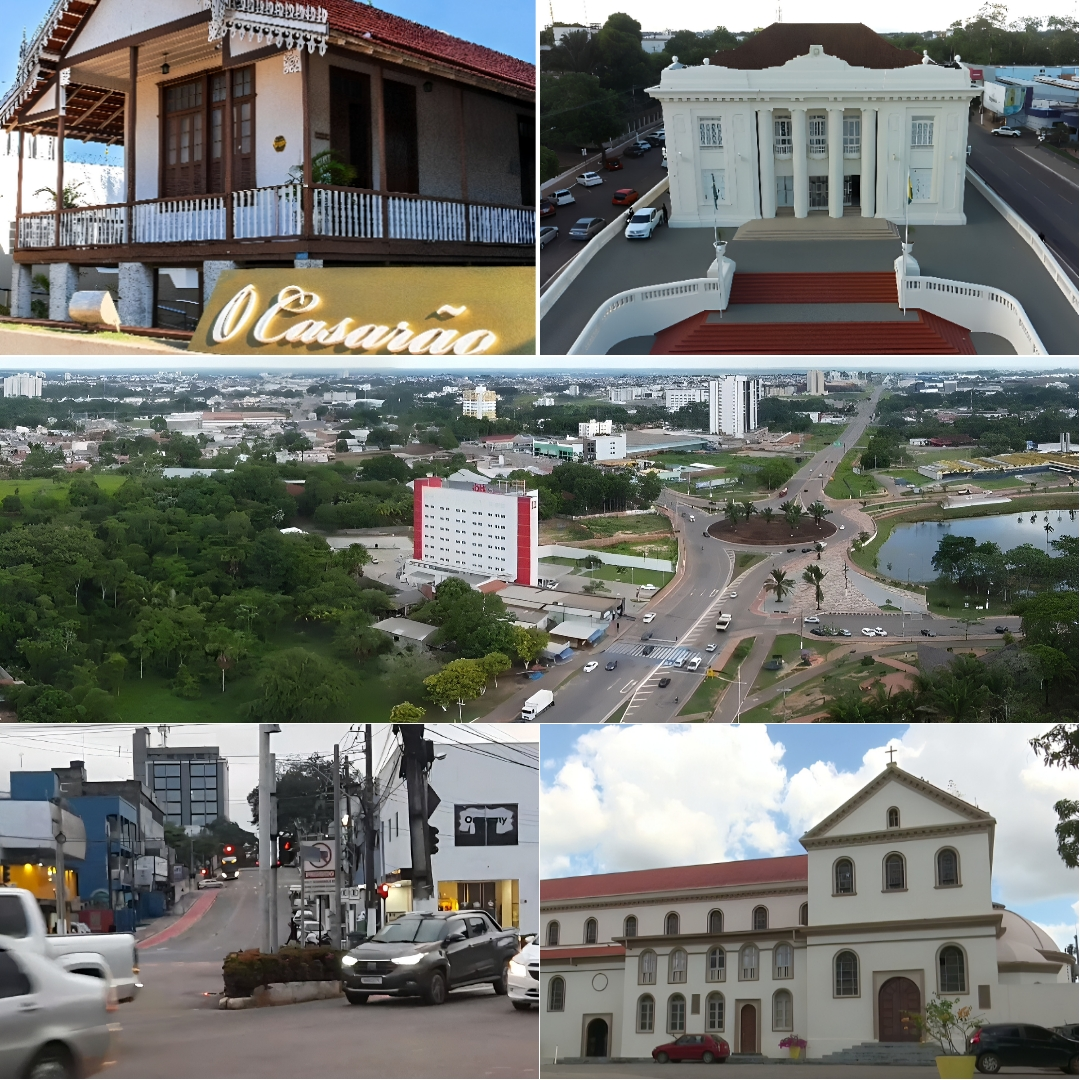
- Clockwise from top left: O Casarão (The Old House), The Rio Branco Palace, Partial view of Rio Branco, Our Lady of Nazareth Cathedral and downtown Rio Branco

- Flag Coat of arms
- Nicknames: "Capital da Natureza" (Capital of Nature), "Capital da Amazônia Ocidental" (Capital of Western Amazon)
- Motto: Ubique Patria Memor (Portuguese: Em qualquer lugar, terei sempre a pátria em minha memória) (Anywhere, I will always have the homeland in my memory)
- Location of Rio Branco in the State of Acre

- Location in Brazil
- Coordinates: 9°58′29″S 67°48′36″W
- Country: Brazil
- Region: North
- State: Acre
- Founded: December 28, 1882

Government
  - Mayor: Tião Bocalom (PSDB)

Area
  - Total: 8,835.68 km^{2} (3,411.48 sq mi)
- Elevation: 143 m (469 ft)

Population (2025)
  - Total: 389,001
  - Density: 43.89/km^{2} (113.7/sq mi)
- Demonym: rio-branquense (Portuguese)
- Time zone: UTC−5 (ACT)
- Postal code: 69900-001 to 69924-999
- Area code: +55 (68)
- HDI (2010): 0.727 – high
- Website: www.riobranco.ac.gov.br

Rio Branco (Portuguese pronunciation: [ˈʁi.u ˈbɾɐ̃ku]; lit. 'White River') is a Brazilian municipality, capital of the state of Acre. Located in the valley of the Acre River in northern Brazil, it is the most populous municipality in the state, with 387,852 inhabitants, according to 2024 IBGE estimates, almost half the state population. Rio Branco was one of the first settlements to develop in the region, being the westernmost major settlement in the country and the 4th-oldest state capital city in Northern Brazil, after Belém, Manaus and Macapá.

In 1913, it became a county. In 1920, it became the capital of the territory of Acre, and in 1962, the state capital. It is the administrative center for the economic, political and cultural region.

== History ==
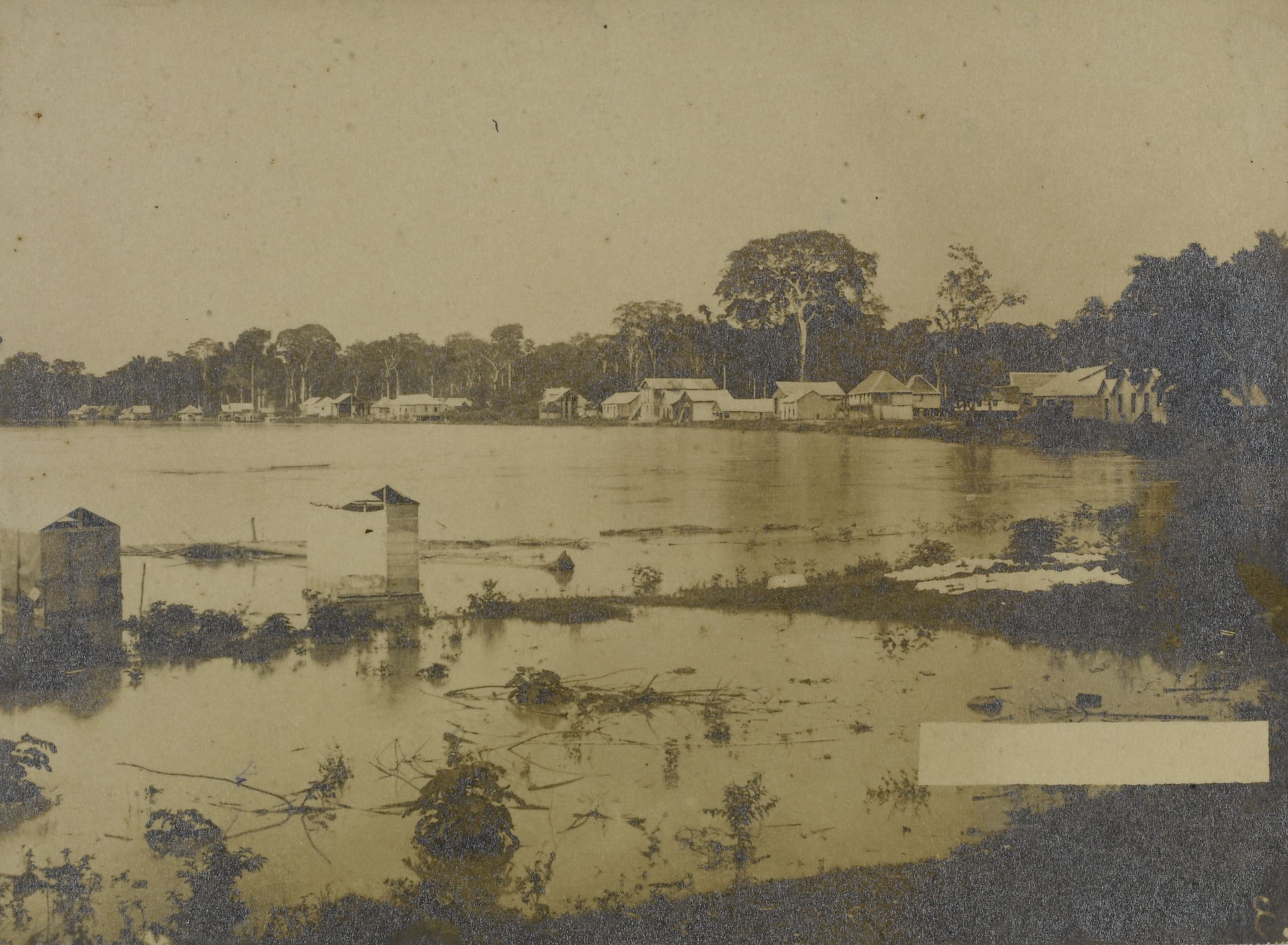
Rio Branco, Brazil, 1908.

The capital of the state of Acre developed from the rubber plantation founded on December 28, 1882, by migrant settlers from the Northeastern Region of Brazil. Then called Seringal Volta da Empresa, it was located on the right bank of the Acre river. The Gameleira tree marks this site. This is now classified as the Second District of the city.

The construction of workers' shacks was done in lands previously occupied by the Aquiri, Canamari, and Maneteri Amazonian indigenous tribes. Years later, the same Gameleira tree survived the battles fought at Volta da Empresa, between Acre revolutionaries and Bolivian troops, during the critical period of the Acre War. As a result, Brazil acquired Acre at the beginning of the 20th century.

By August 1904, Villa Rio Branco had become the main urban center of the entire Acre valley, and was the richest and most productive in the region. During this period of the rubber boom, the streets around the Gameleira were the center of commercial and urban life in this part of the Amazon. Bars, cafes, and casinos supplied the city's nightlife; commercial representatives came here of the chief national and foreign Aviation houses that handled thousands of Contos de Réis. There were many wealthy families in the city.

The urban elite was largely composed of liberal professionals and civil servants. The political administration of the Territory was transferred to the left bank of the Acre River, because its lands were higher and not as subject to flooding as the old city centre. The early commercial zone gradually became dominated by Syrian and Lebanese immigrants. By the mid-1930s, one area was known as "Bairro Beirut" (Beirut neighborhood).

By the 1950s, this older section had become run down and known as the Second District. As a large part of its main commercial houses had transferred to the city's First District, on the left bank of the river, following the construction there of the main public offices and residences of the most important families. Today, Rio Branco is seeking to find ways to reinvent itself, through relations with neighboring countries, developing heritage and eco-tourism, building on the local fish farming industry, and so on. In spite of its remote location, Rio Branco is one of the oldest cities in the region, predating other state capitals of the Brazilian interior, like Goiânia, Belo Horizonte, Porto Velho, Brasília, Palmas, and Boa Vista.

== Geography ==
Rio Branco is located at 9° 58' 29" south and 67° 48' 36" west, at an altitude of 143 metres (469 ft) above sea level. The city has developed on both sides of the Acre River, with areas known as the First (left bank) and Second Districts. The river is crossed by six bridges, the newest bridge being the Joaquim Macedo Catwalk.

Rio Branco is located in the mesoregion of Vale do Jurua and the microregion of Rio Branco. It is bordered on the north by the municipalities of Bujari and Porto Acre; to the south by the municipalities of Xapuri, Capixaba, and Plácido de Castro; to the east by the municipality of Senador Guiomard; and to the west by the municipality of Sena Madureira.

=== Vegetation ===
The municipality contains part of the 931,537 hectares (2,301,880 acres) Chico Mendes Extractive Reserve, a sustainable use environmental unit created in 1990.

=== Climate ===
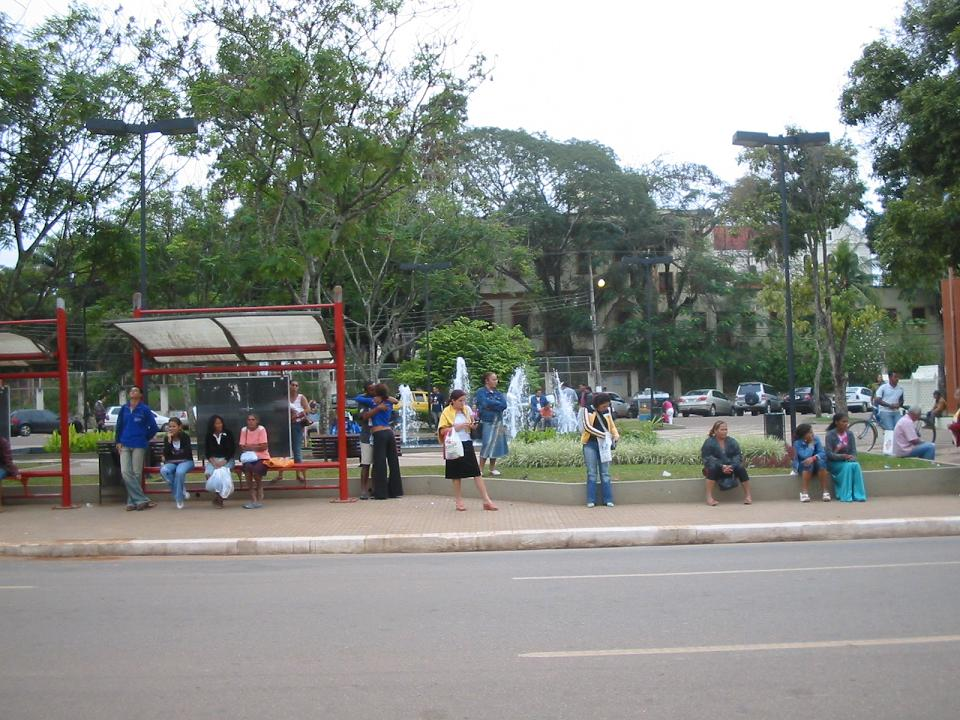
Rio Branco on a cool day of 16 °C or 60.8 °F

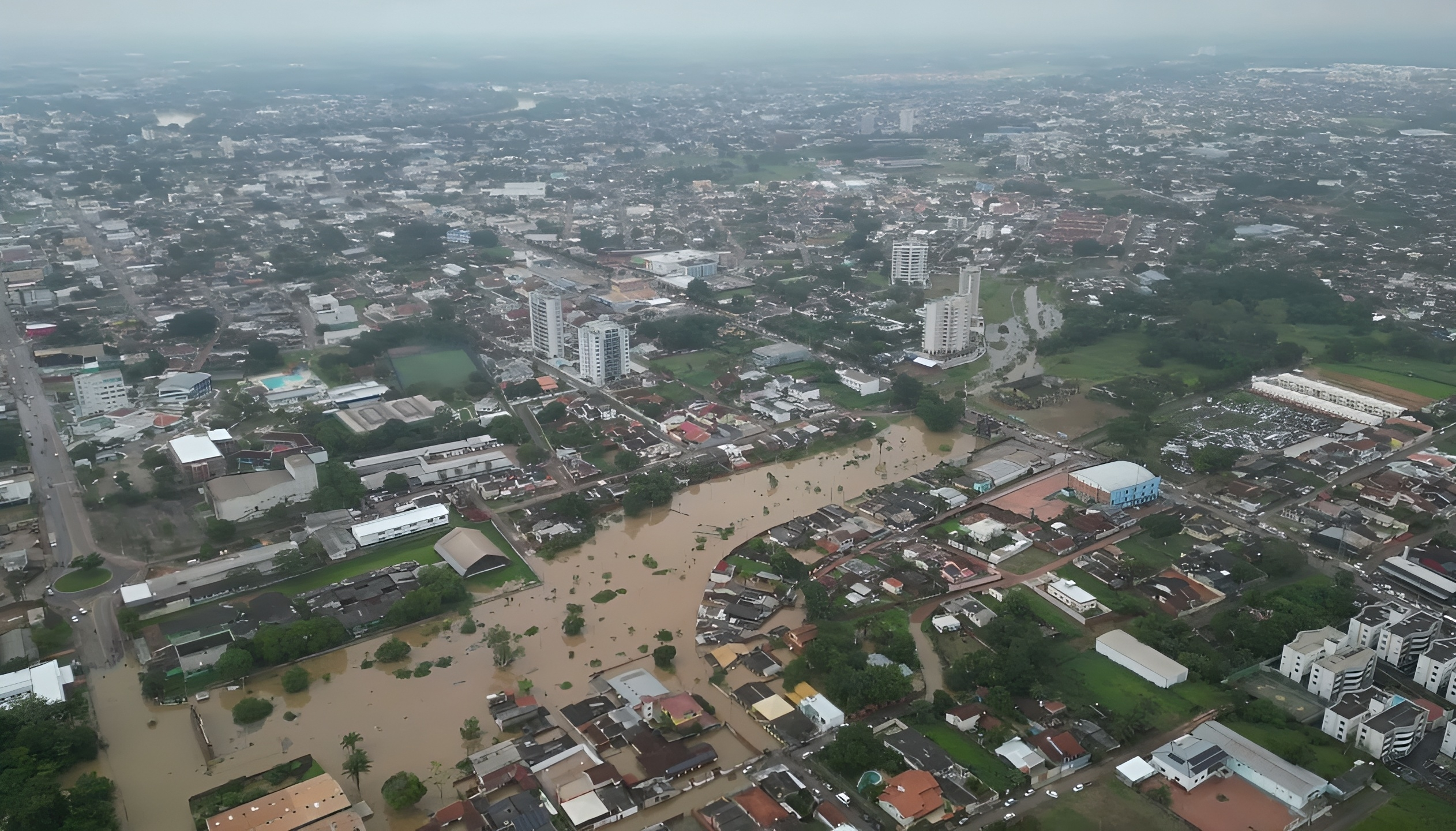
Rio Branco faces seasonal floodings at times, as the one pictured; March 2023, when over 15,000 people were displaced, due to a total of 585.9 mm of rain, in that month, only.

The city of Rio Branco has the lowest average annual temperature among Legal Amazonian and Northeastern capitals. The city has a tropical monsoon climate, with temperatures between 23 and 33 °C or 73.4 and 91.4 °F during the hottest days of the year. The lowest temperatures occur at night, with frequent records of 22 °C or 71.6 °F at dawn. The period from December to March is the hottest time of year, with highs of 38 °C or 100.4 °F or more. Usually between May and August, the region experiences a cooler weather, registering lower temperatures (around 15 °C or 59 °F) compared to regional standards. In July 2010 the city experienced record low temperatures. On the afternoon of the 17th, temperatures were registered to be 14.7 °C or 58.5 °F on average with a minimum of 12.1 °C or 53.8 °F. The 19th stood out with a minimum at 9.8 °C or 49.6 °F. However, the month's maximum reached 28 °C or 82.4 °F.

Rio Branco has a lengthy wet season spanning from October through May and a relatively short dry season covering the remaining four months. The city on average sees roughly 1.9 metres or 6 feet 3 inches of rainfall annually. Rio Branco experiences its heaviest rainfall from December through March, averaging over 200 millimetres or 8 inches of precipitation per month during that timeframe. The Acre River has many floodplain spots.

Climate data for Rio Branco (1991–2020 normals, extremes 1892–present)
Month	Jan	Feb	Mar	Apr	May	Jun	Jul	Aug	Sep	Oct	Nov	Dec	Year
Record high °C (°F)	36.3 (97.3)	37.2 (99.0)	37.2 (99.0)	38.2 (100.8)	39.7 (103.5)	35.2 (95.4)	37.8 (100.0)	38.3 (100.9)	39.2 (102.6)	38.4 (101.1)	37.4 (99.3)	39.8 (103.6)	39.8 (103.6)
Mean daily maximum °C (°F)	30.9 (87.6)	30.8 (87.4)	31.0 (87.8)	31.2 (88.2)	30.6 (87.1)	30.7 (87.3)	31.8 (89.2)	33.3 (91.9)	33.7 (92.7)	33.1 (91.6)	32.1 (89.8)	31.2 (88.2)	31.7 (89.1)
Mean daily minimum °C (°F)	22.8 (73.0)	22.6 (72.7)	22.7 (72.9)	22.2 (72.0)	20.8 (69.4)	19.4 (66.9)	18.3 (64.9)	18.9 (66.0)	20.8 (69.4)	22.3 (72.1)	22.6 (72.7)	22.8 (73.0)	21.4 (70.4)
Record low °C (°F)	14.2 (57.6)	16.0 (60.8)	14.0 (57.2)	10.4 (50.7)	2.6 (36.7)	7.8 (46.0)	6.0 (42.8)	8.0 (46.4)	10.0 (50.0)	12.4 (54.3)	13.6 (56.5)	13.4 (56.1)	2.6 (36.7)
Average precipitation mm (inches)	286.1 (11.26)	298.9 (11.77)	285.6 (11.24)	204.3 (8.04)	98.7 (3.89)	44.8 (1.76)	28.2 (1.11)	57.0 (2.24)	93.6 (3.69)	144.0 (5.67)	208.8 (8.22)	260.6 (10.26)	2,010.6 (79.15)
Average precipitation days (≥ 1 mm)	18.4	17.0	16.9	13.4	8.3	3.9	2.6	4.1	6.5	10.1	13.0	17.9	132.1
Average relative humidity (%)	89.3	89.1	88.7	88.0	87.1	85.5	81.0	76.7	78.2	82.6	85.5	87.8	85.0
Average dew point °C (°F)	24.0 (75.2)	24.0 (75.2)	24.1 (75.4)	23.9 (75.0)	23.0 (73.4)	22.0 (71.6)	20.9 (69.6)	21.2 (70.2)	22.5 (72.5)	23.7 (74.7)	24.0 (75.2)	24.1 (75.4)	23.1 (73.6)
Mean monthly sunshine hours	115.4	94.6	118.2	143.1	169.6	182.6	228.0	202.7	175.5	167.8	143.6	122.8	1,863.9
Source 1: Instituto Nacional de Meteorologia
Source 2: NOAA Meteo Climat (record highs and lows)

== Economy ==
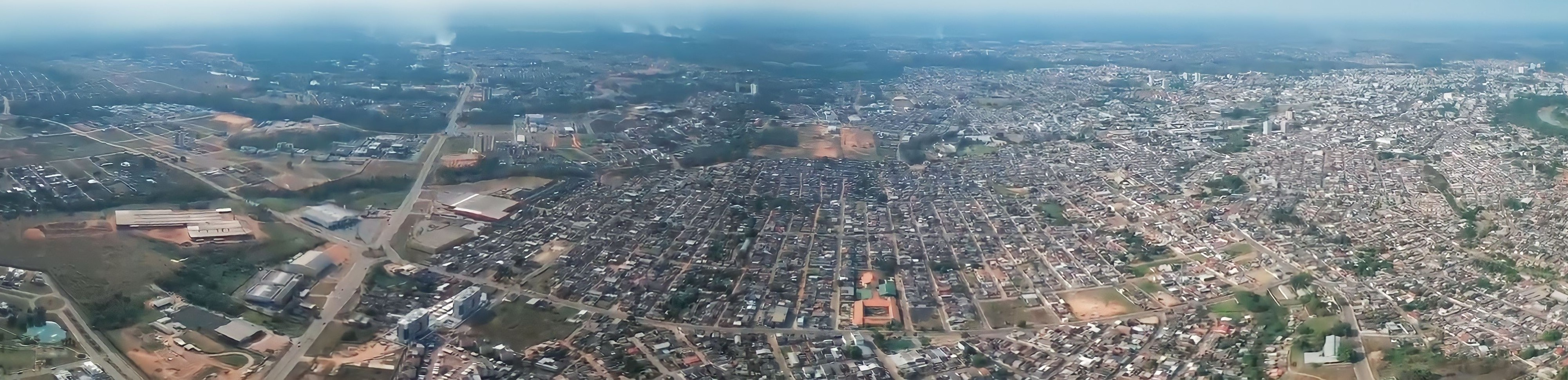
1st District of Rio Branco, a historically neglected region, which, over time, became the part of the city where the commerce concentrates the most. On the left, the south part of Rio Branco, a region linked to the ring road of the city (Via Verde) which has the presence of large enterprises such as; shopping malls, wholesale stores, government agencies, universities, soccer stadiums, convention centers, parks, etc. On the right, one can see the neighborhoods of Bosque, Estação Experimental, Jardim Europa, Abraão Alab, Cerâmica, Downtown Rio Branco among others.

Historically, the economy of Rio Branco has been based on the extraction of rubber and brazil nuts. Wood is the main product of export in the state of Acre. The area is also a major producer of açaí fruit, farinha, copaiba oil and beef.

Rio Branco is undergoing a transformation in its economy that includes an expansion to Agribusiness, Aquaculture and Ecotourism. Brazil's largest oil and gas company Petrobras, says the region has potential for future extraction of petroleum.

=== Media ===
VHF television
2 – TV Village (Culture / TV Brazil)
4 – TV Acre (Globo TV)
5 – TV 5 (Band)
8 – TV Rio Branco (SBT)
11 – TV Gazeta (Record)
13 – TV Union AC network (Union)

UHF television
19 – Brazil Network
21 – Amazon Sat
27 – Life Network
40 – TV 40 (Record News)
50 – Good News
54 – 58 RIT – TV Nazareth
Digital UHF 14 – Acre HD TV

AM radio
Progress AM: 740 kHz
AM Leader: 800 kHz
University AM: 1350 kHz,
Broadcast Acre: 1400 kHz

FM radio
Ecoacre FM: 90.9 MHz
Gazeta FM: 93.3 MHz
Union FM: 94.7 MHz
Village FM: 96.9 MHz
Acre: MHz FM 98.1MHz
Good News FM: 107.9 MHz
Latin FM: 101.1 MHz
FM 104.9 MHz Gameleira

The city has six newspapers; two are published daily and four weekly. O Tabloide, A Gazeta, Página 20, A Tribuna, and O Estado are weekly newspapers. Cellular carriers who maintain coverage in the region are Vivo S.A., TIM, Oi, and Claro. The main companies offering fixed telephone coverage in the city are Embratel, Oi, and GVT.

=== Transportation ===
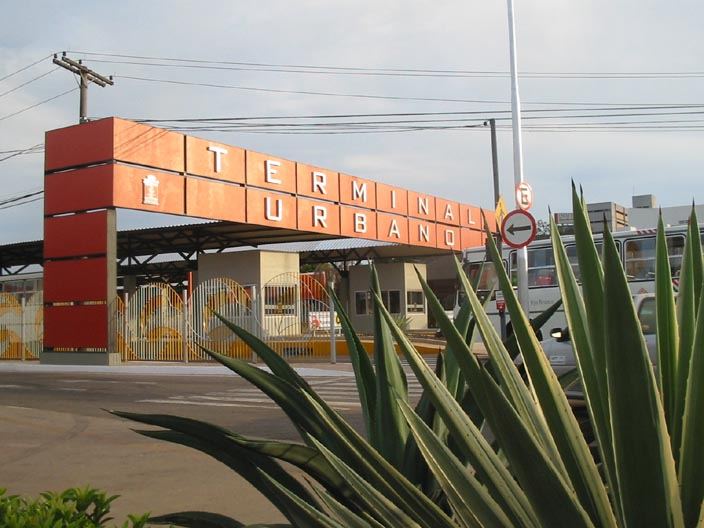
The Terminal Urbano bus station is located in the city centre.

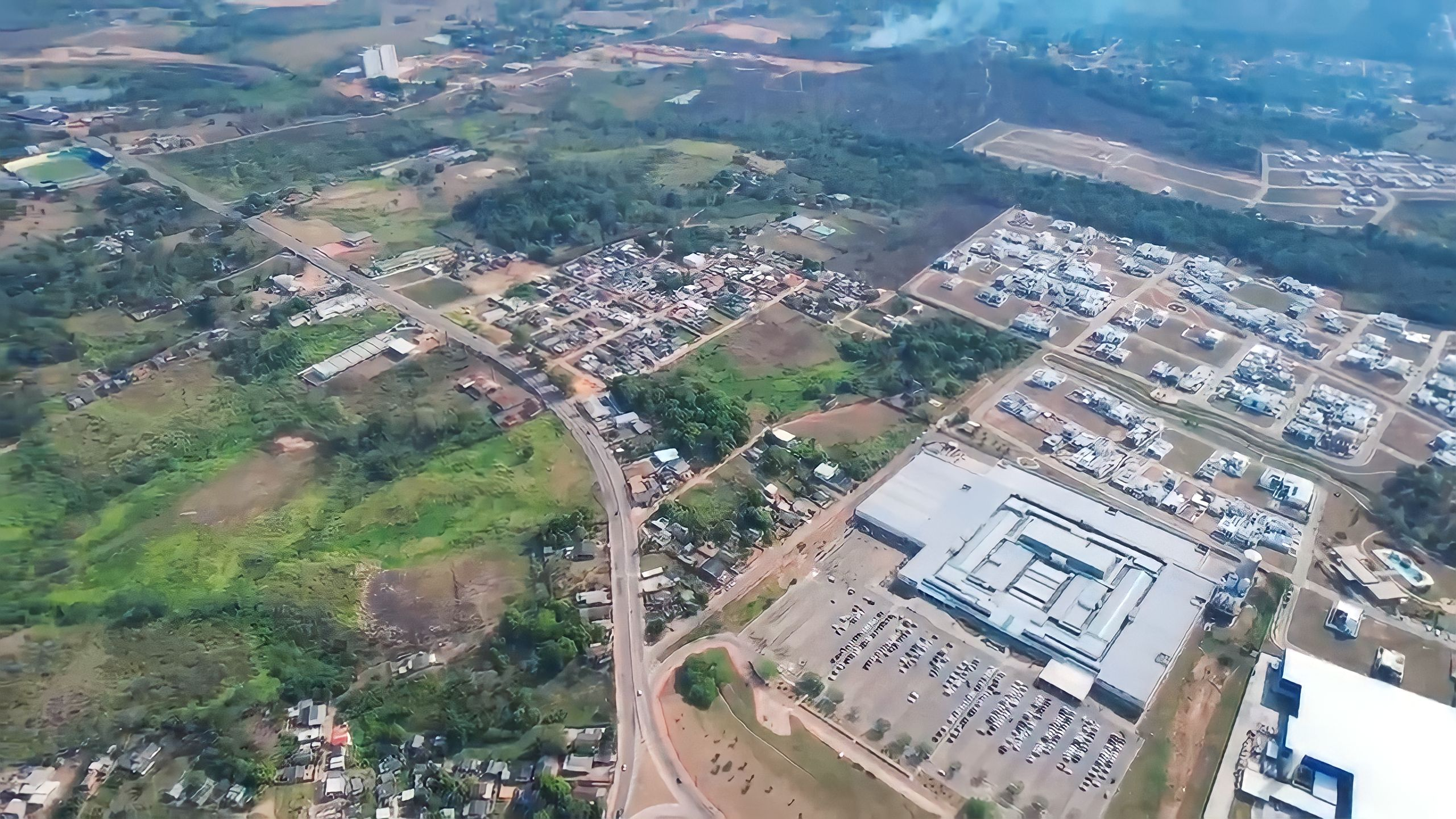
The Via Verde Ring Road is the city's ring road and it connects the main highways that reach Rio Branco, which are; the BR-364 and the Interoceanic Highway. In it, one can also find the Via Verde Mall - one of the city's shopping malls - important hospitals, schools, hotels and the Rio Branco International Bus Station.

The public transport system has improved in recent years, mainly due to the construction of the Terminal Urbano (Urban Bus Terminal) near the center of town. However, the buses are still delayed. Taxis, including motorcycle taxis, are widely used by the population. Rio Branco is the Brazilian state capital city with the largest proportional bike path network per inhabitant in the country.

Rio Branco-Plácido de Castro International Airport is 18 kilometres (11 mi) away on the BR-364 highway in the rural area. This new airport was officially opened on November 22, 1999, when the older facility, Presidente Médici International Airport, was closed. The BR-364 was twinned to facilitate access to the airport, which serves domestic and international aviation and military operations, with scheduled airlines and air taxis. The terminal is ready to receive 320,000 passengers per year and performs about 14 operations a day. By August 2010 it was the seventh-busiest airport in Northern Brazil, and the 38th busiest airport in the country.

The BR-364 and the BR-317 (Interoceanic Highway) are the main highways in Acre, and the Via Verde Ring Road is the one that connects them. To the east, the BR-364 connects Rio Branco to Southeastern Brazil. The highway cuts west across the state, linking Rio Branco to Cruzeiro do Sul, the second major city of the state, through the municipalities of Sena Madureira, Manoel Urbano, Feijó, Tarauacá, and Rodrigues Alves. The BR-317 has a length of 330 kilometres (210 mi), and links the capital to the south of the state, through the municipalities of Senador Guiomard, Capixaba, and Epitaciolândia, on the border with Republic of Bolivia. From Brasiléia the road continues for another 110 kilometres (68 mi) to reach the city of Assis Brasil on the border with Peru. The highway continues on the Peruvian side as part of the Interoceanic Highway and as Highway 30C and Highway 26 to the city of Cuzco.

=== Attractions ===
The Rio Branco Palace was built in 1930 for the seat of the state government. The building was restored beginning in 1999 to preserve its historical character. In 2008 it was transformed into a museum of history.

Gameleira is a historical site by the curve of the Acre River where city was first founded. More than a century later, the strangler fig located there is a vigorous tree, measuring 2.5 metres (8.2 ft) in diameter at the trunk and 20 metres (66 ft) in height.

Opened in 1958, the Cathedral of Our Lady of Nazareth was constructed in the style of an ancient Roman basilica. Its interior has three naves separated by 36 stained-glass windows, donated by families of Acre. The exterior is composed of gables, the cross, and the churchyard. In 2007 the church was considered public property of the state of Acre.

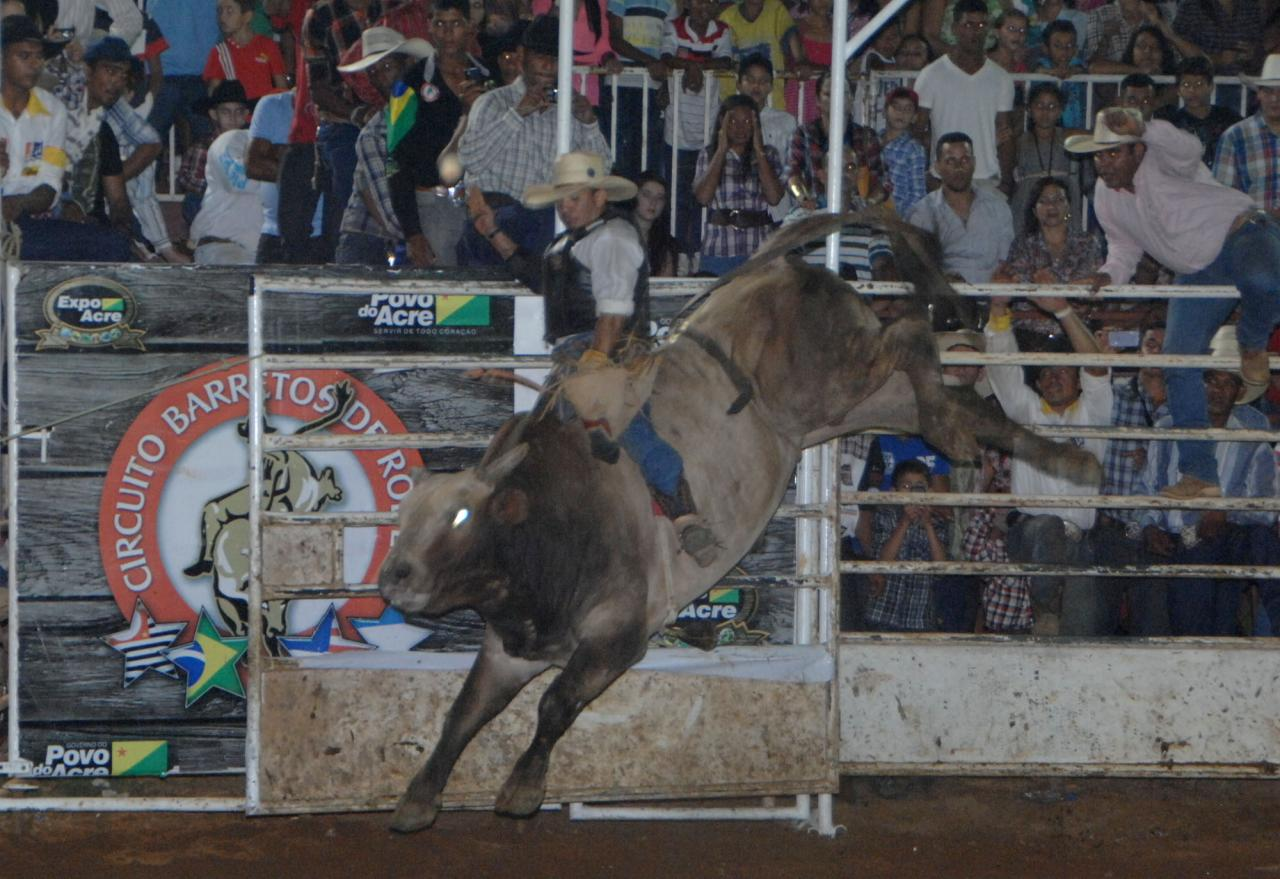
Rodeo at ExpoAcre Field Day, in Rio Branco, held in the months of July and August.

Also known as the Square of the Revolution, Square Plácido de Castro is located in the heart of the city, opposite the headquarters of the Military Police of Acre. Recently, the square underwent renovation. The Autonomists Memorial has a museum, exhibitions of paintings by regional artists, a coffee shop, and a drama theatre. The museum possesses a large collection of historic photos of the state, as well as historical objects used during the Revolution. The Museum of Rubber includes sections on archeology and paleontology, and a historical collection of manuscripts and documents relating to the history of Acre.

The Catwalk Joaquim Macedo is a pedestrian bridge linking the two districts of the city. Passing over the Acre River, the catwalk is a cable suspension bridge completed in 2006. The nearby Old Market, built in the 1920s, was recently refurbished. Maternity Park opened on September 28, 2002. It has sports facilities, kiosks, restaurants, biking trails, and skate parks.

Rio Branco has two shopping malls: the Mira Shopping and the Via Verde Shopping, which was completed in 2011.

The sepulcher of Raimundo Irineu Serra, founder of the religion known internationally as Santo Daime, is located in the Alto Santo neighborhood and has become a place of international pilgrimage.

== Demographics ==
The population of the municipality in 2024 is estimated at 387,852 inhabitants by the Brazilian Institute of Geography and Statistics (IBGE), almost half of the population of Acre. It is the largest city in the state and one of Brazil's most populous. The population density of 43.89 inhabitants per square kilometer. According to the 2000 census, 51% of the population are male and 48.2% female; 92.73% of the population lives in urban areas and 7.22% live in rural areas. According to the Atlas of Human Development in Brazil, the population of Rio Branco is 0.16% of the national population. According to the Superior Electoral Court, Rio Branco has 271,518 voters in 2024.

The Municipal Human Development Index of Rio Branco is considered average by the United Nations Development Programme, with a value of 0.754. The education index is 0.860, while Brazil's is 0.849. The rate of longevity is 0.697 (the Brazilian rate is 0.638) and income is 0.704 (Brazil's is 0.723). The Gini coefficient, which measures inequality, is 0.52, where 1.00 is the worst result and 0.00 is the best. The incidence of poverty, as measured by the IBGE, is 37.21 per cent, and the incidence of subjective poverty is 39.39 per cent.

Race and ethnicity in Rio Branco
Ethnicity	Percentage
Pardo (Multiracial)	65.4%
White	24.3%
Black	9.5%
Amerindian	0.5%
Asian	0.3%

== Education ==
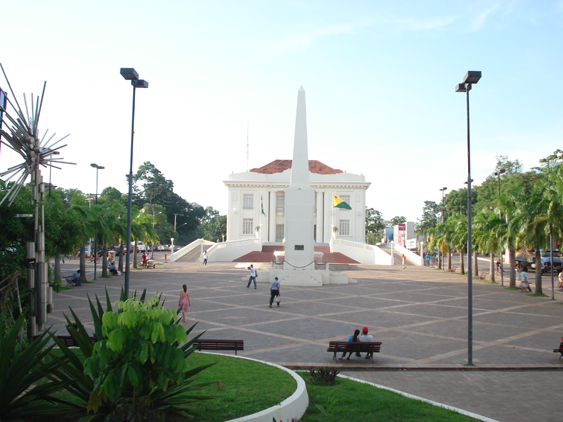
Rio Branco is the most important educational centre of the state.

In 2009 the city of Rio Branco had 211 elementary schools, with 64,349 students and 2,367 teachers. The Index of Basic Education Development for elementary schools was 4.9, ranked 10th among Brazilian capitals, and above the national average of 4.6. There are an estimated 70 kindergarten preschools with 402 teachers and 10,168 students.

Higher education institutions include the Federal University of Acre (UFAC), the Northern Educational Union, the College of the Western Amazonia, and the Community College of Acre, among others. These absorb the bulk of registrations, especially the Federal University of Acre, as the only public college in the state.

In 2008, the illiteracy rate in the state was 13 per cent, with 36.2 per cent of the population functionally illiterate.

== Sports ==
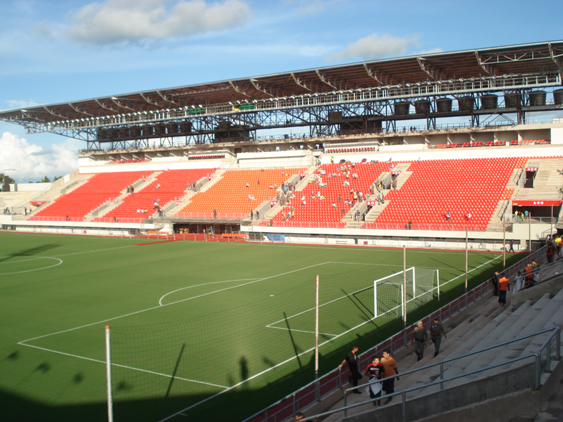
Arena da Floresta, Rio Branco, Brazil

Rio Branco provides visitors and residents with various sport activities. The three main football teams in Acre are based in Rio Branco: Rio Branco FC, Juventus and Atlético Acreano. Stadiums in the city are the Arena da Floresta; José de Melo Stadium; Federação Acreana de Futebol Stadium; Dom Giocondo Maria Grotti Stadium; and Adauto de Brito Stadium. Rio Branco was one of 18 candidates shortlisted to host games of the 2014 FIFA World Cup, for which Brazil was the only South American bidder. The city's bid was rejected.

== Consular representation ==
Peru has a Consulate-General in Rio Branco.

== Sister cities ==
- Reggio Emilia, Emilia-Romagna, Italy
- Zhuhai, Guangdong, China

== Notable people ==
- Enéas Carneiro, politician
- Carlão, brazilian volleyball player, Olympic champion
- Weverton Pereira da Silva, football player
- João Donato, musician
- Ramon Dino, bodybuilder
- Michelle Melo, politician
- Marina Silva, Brazilian environmentalist and Minister of the Environment and Climate Change, recipient of the UN Champions of the Earth Environmental Award

== Gallery ==
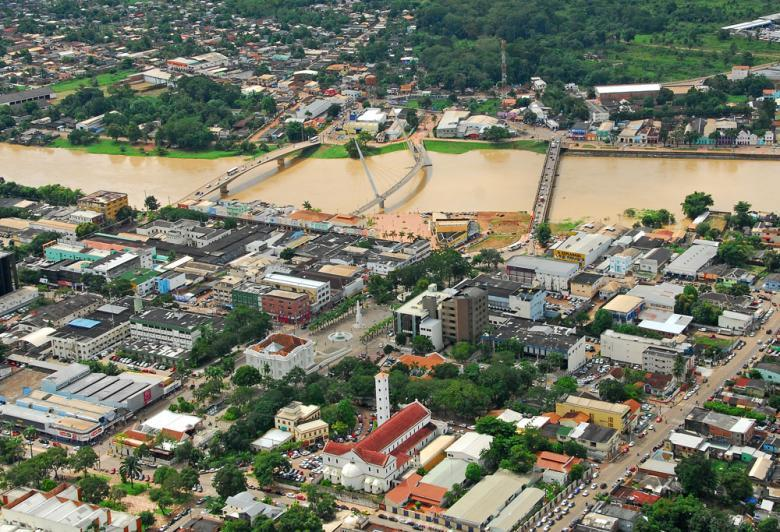
Aerial view of old town Rio Branco, Brazil

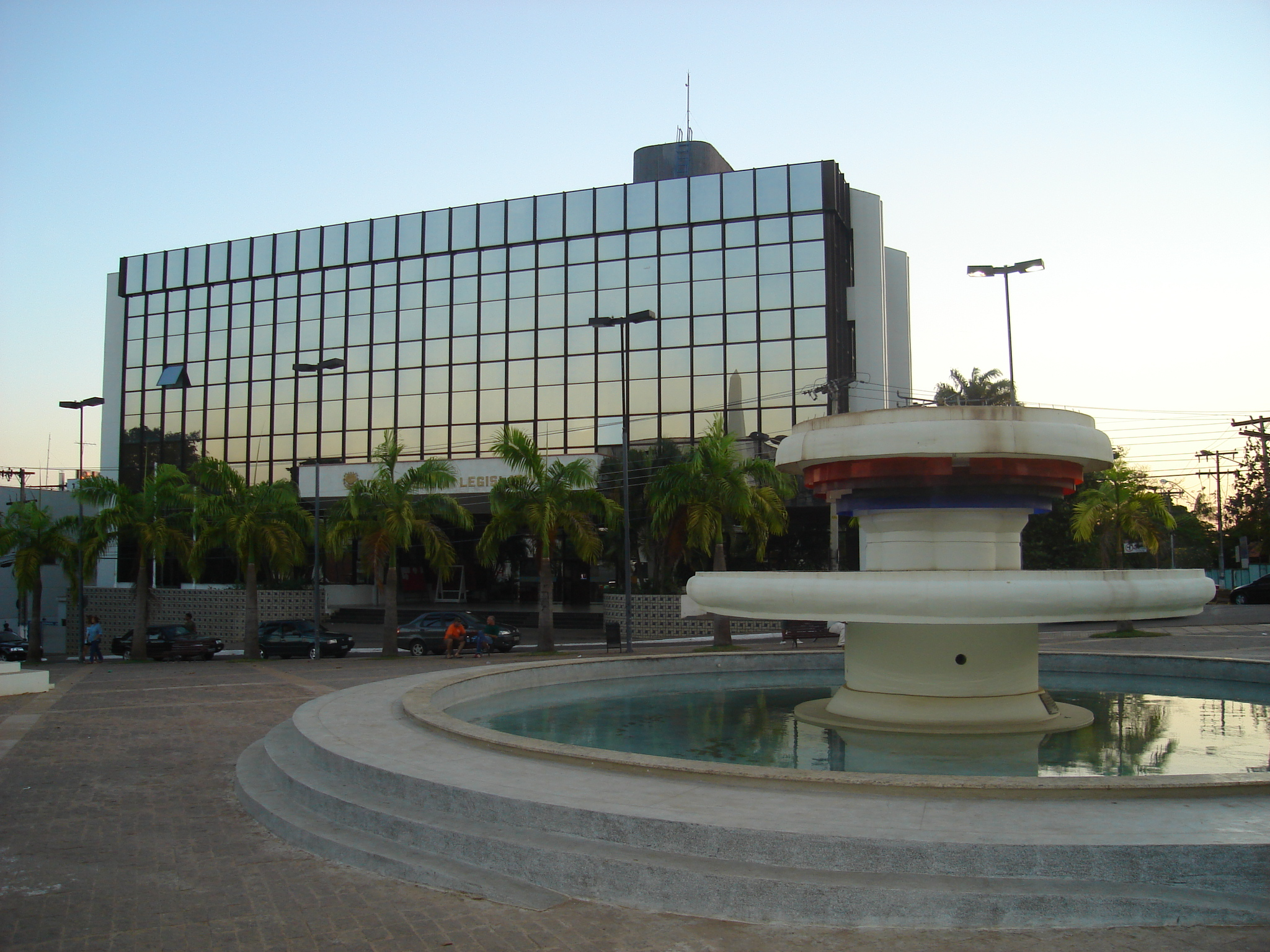
Rio Branco in the afternoon

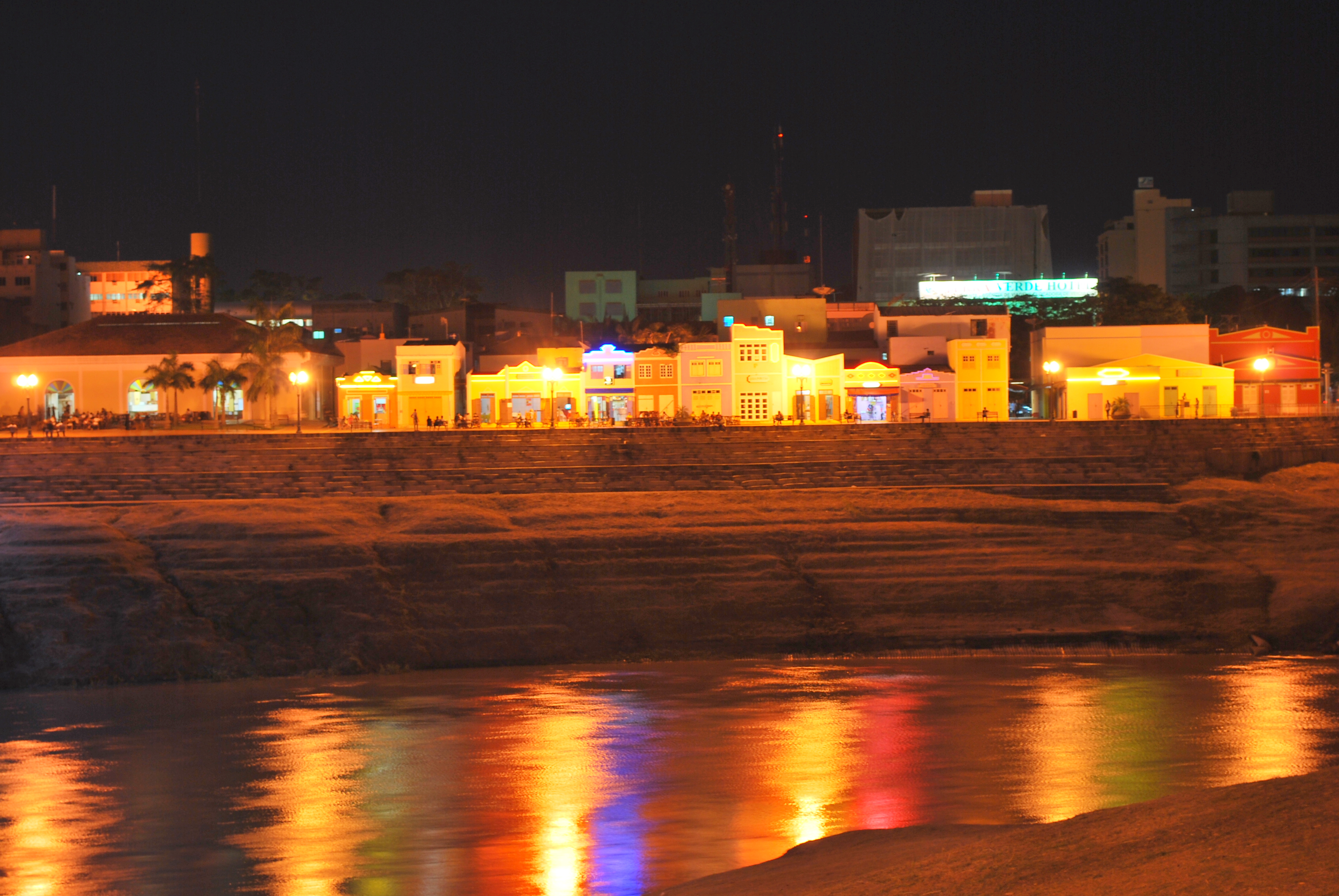
View of the city centre

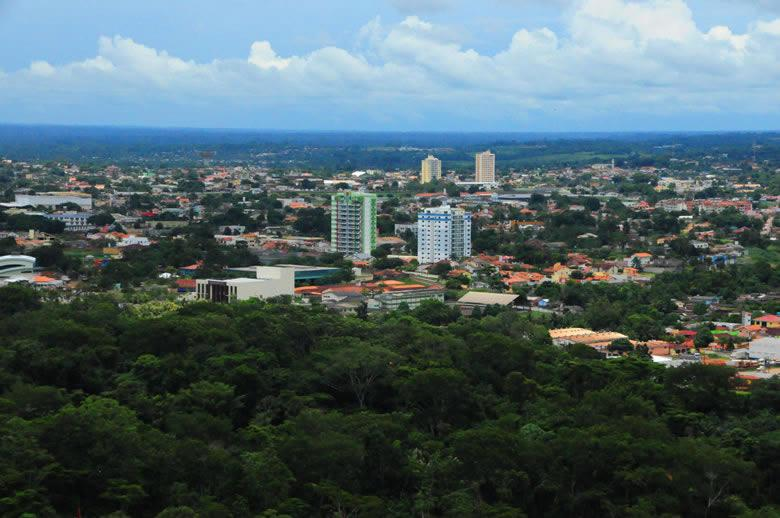
View of Rio Branco, Acre

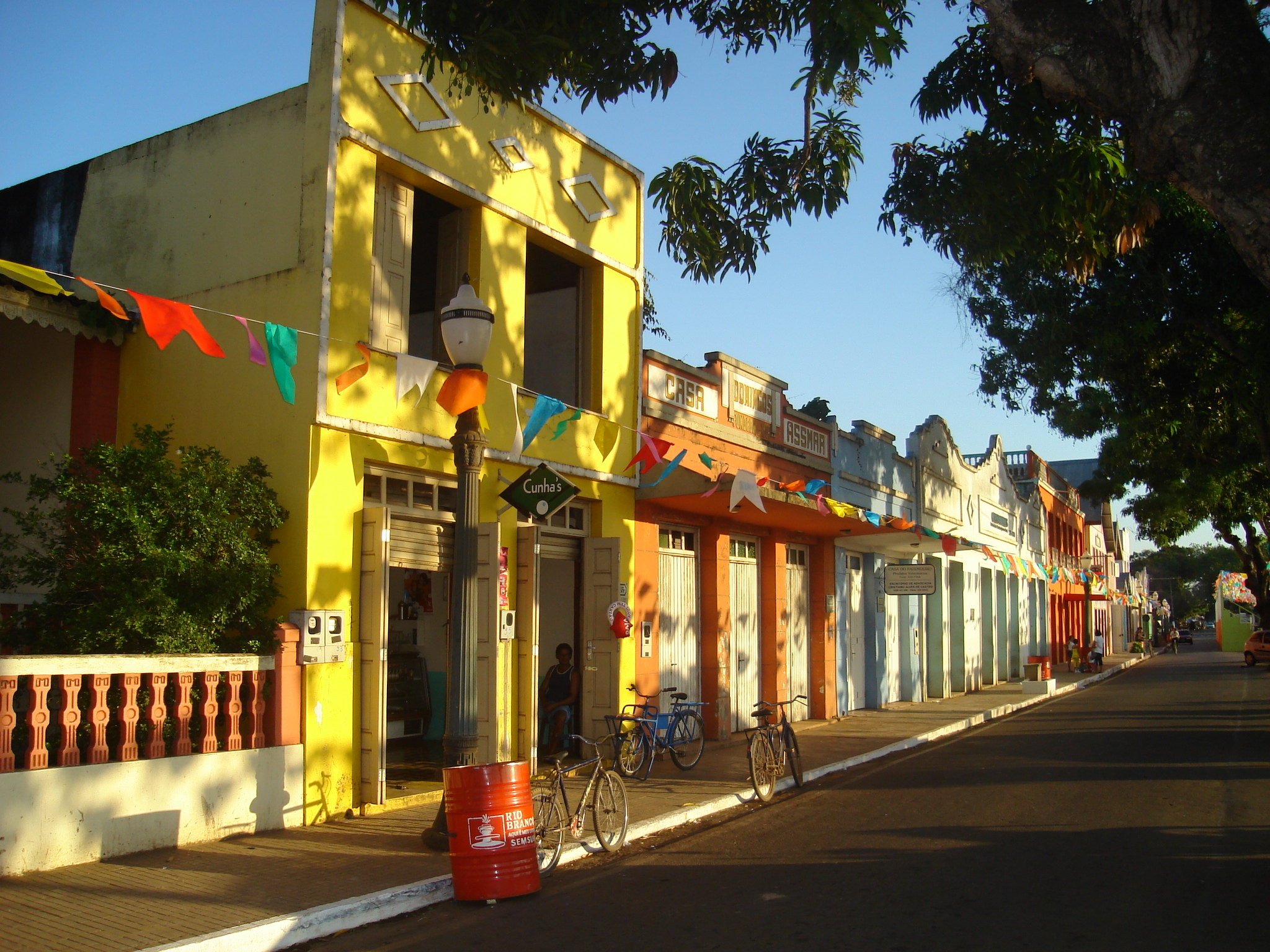
Historic houses of Rio Branco, Brazil

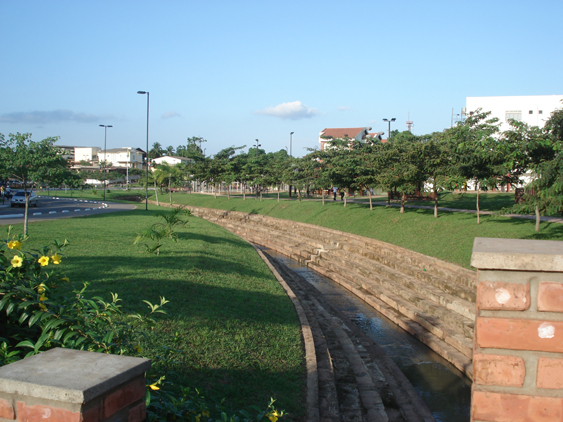
Canal da Maternidade, Rio Branco of Acre

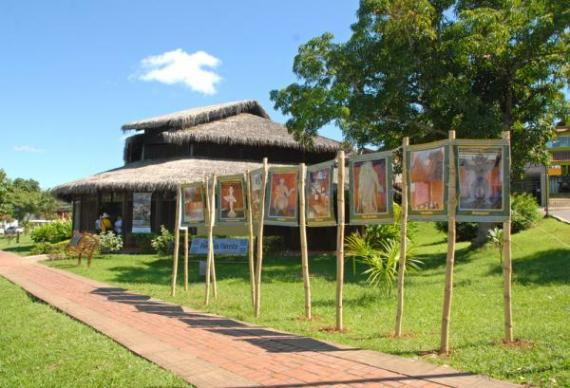
Casa dos Povos da Floresta Museum, Rio Branco, Brazil

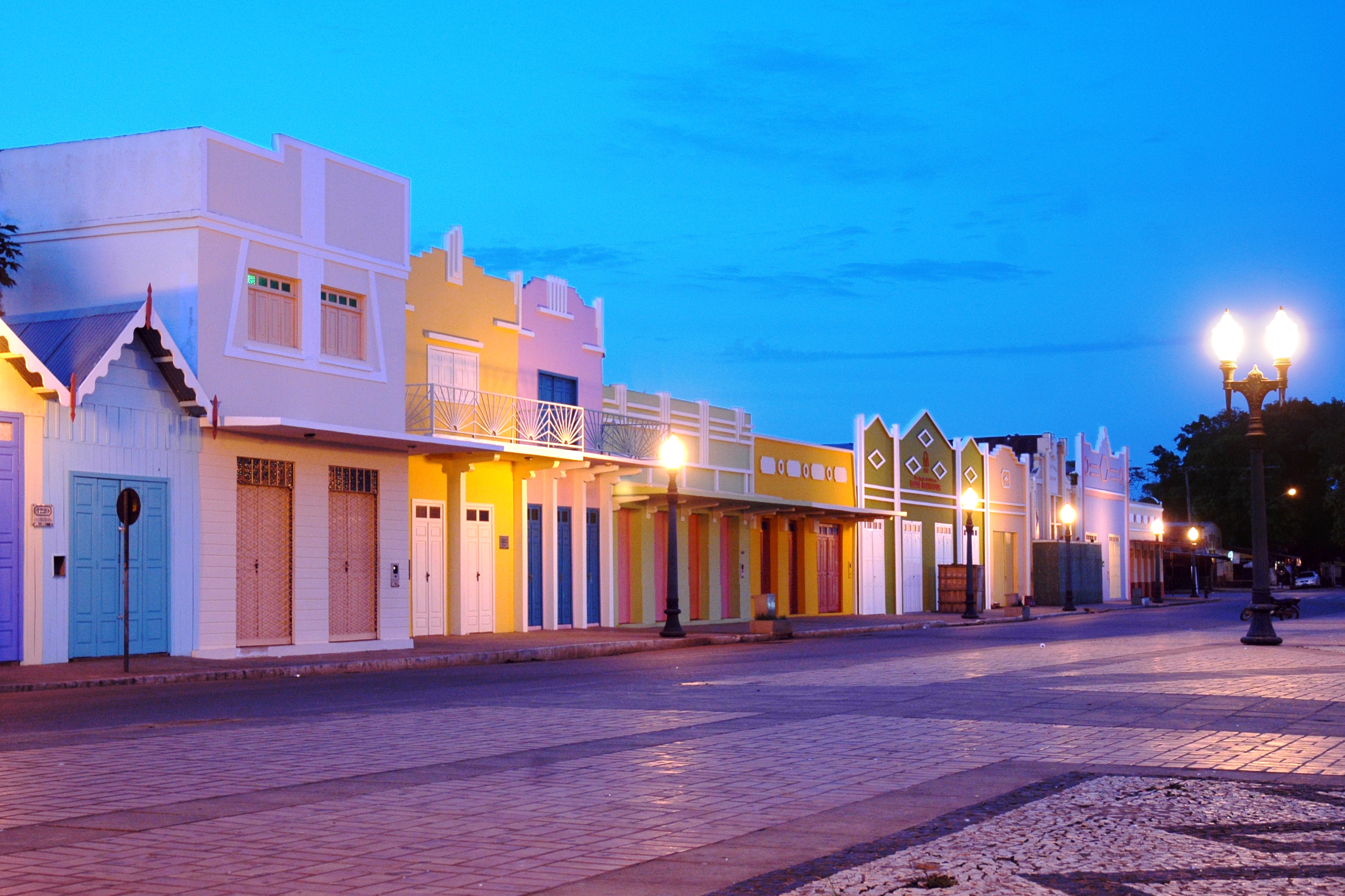
Downtown Rio Branco, at the Gameleira boardwalk, Acre

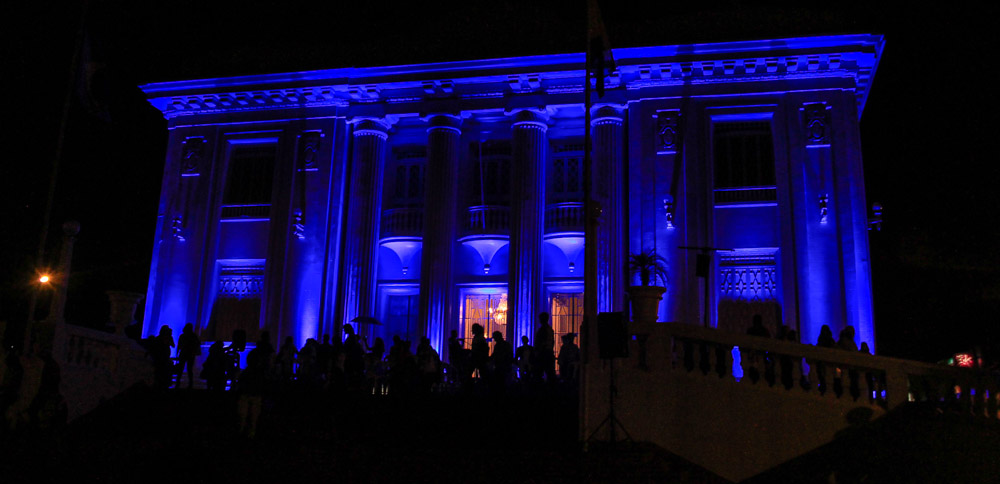
Event at Palácio Rio Branco, Rio Branco, Brazil

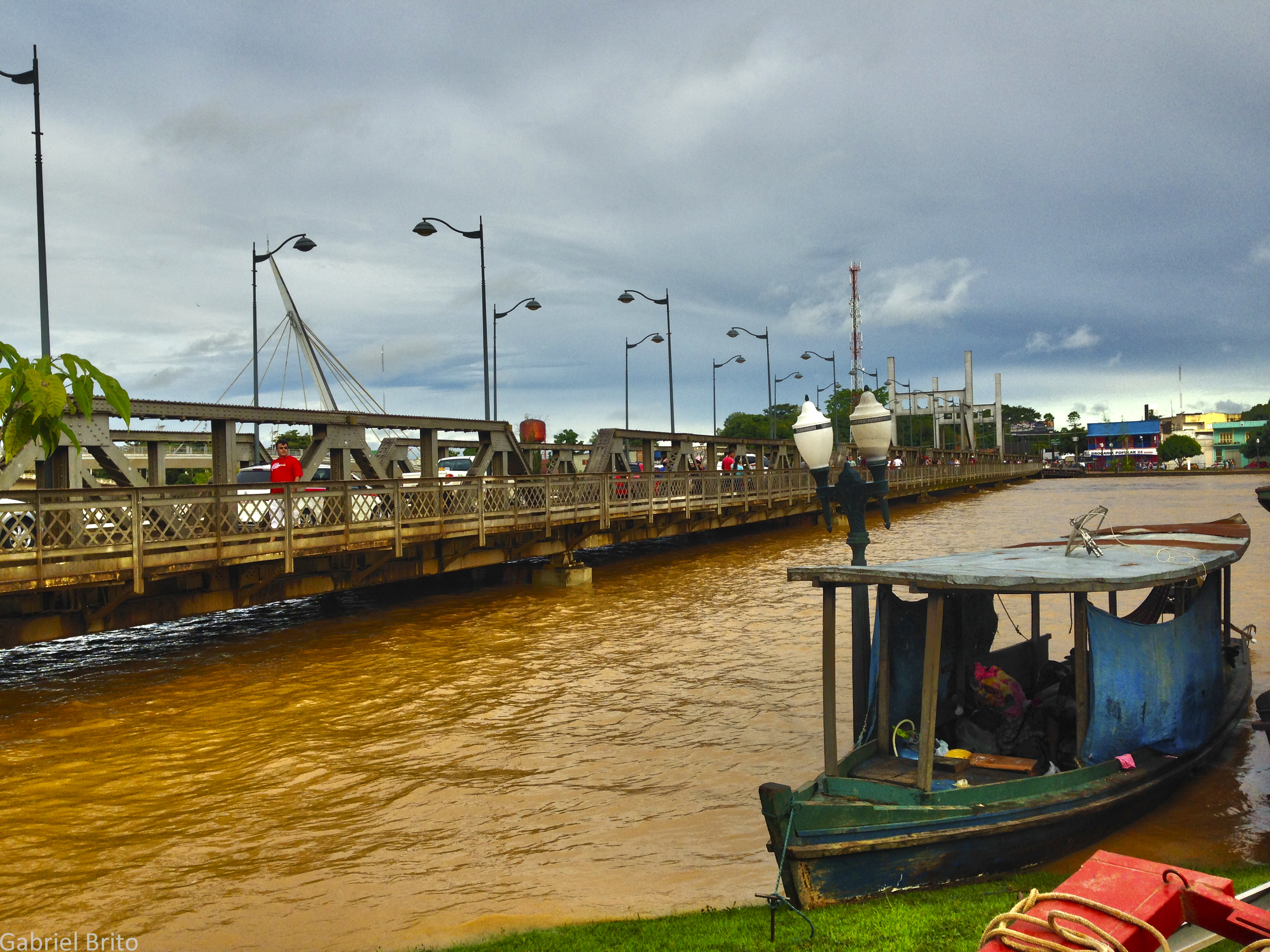
Flood of the Acre River in Rio Branco, Brazil
