= 2023 Copa do Brasil first round =

Brazilian football competition

The 2023 Copa do Brasil first round was the first round of the 2023 Copa do Brasil football competition. It was played from 21 February to 2 March 2023. A total of 80 teams competed in the first round to decide 40 places in the second round of the tournament.

== Draw ==
The draw for the first and second rounds was held on 8 February 2023, 14:00 at CBF headquarters in Rio de Janeiro. Teams were seeded by their CBF ranking (shown in parentheses). The 80 qualified teams were divided in eight groups (A-H) with 10 teams each. The matches were drawn from the respective confronts: A vs. E; B vs. F; C vs. G; D vs. H. The lower-ranked teams hosted the first round match.

Group A	Group B	Group C	Group D
Santos (9); Grêmio (11); América Mineiro (12); Atlético Goianiense (13); Ceará (14); Bahia (15); Botafogo (16); Red Bull Bragantino (17); Goiás (19); Cuiabá (20)	Juventude (21); Vasco da Gama (22); Coritiba (23); Chapecoense (24); Avaí (25); CRB (27); CSA (28); Vitória (29); Vila Nova (30); Ponte Preta (31)	Sampaio Corrêa (32); Criciúma (33); Operário Ferroviário (35); Londrina (36); Náutico (37); Remo (38); Tombense (39); Brasil de Pelotas (40); Brusque (41); ABC (44)	Ituano (46); Botafogo (48); Manaus (49); Volta Redonda (52); Ypiranga (53); Ferroviário (54); Botafogo (56); Santa Cruz (59); Brasiliense (61); América de Natal (62)
Group E	Group F	Group G	Group H
Campinense (64); Jacuipense (67); São Raimundo (73); Tocantinópolis (76); Bahia de Feira (80); Caldense (84); Atlético de Alagoinhas (85); ASA (87); Sergipe (88); Ceilândia (91)	União Rondonópolis (93); Real Noroeste (96); Retrô (98); Marcílio Dias (101); Tuna Luso (118); Fluminense (118); São Luiz (121); Nova Iguaçu (127); Humaitá (132); Trem (132)	São Bernardo (145); Vitória (145); Nova Mutum (148); Tuntum (166); Caucaia (168); Real Ariquemes (171); Maringá (185); Operário (200); Marília (214); Cordino (220)	Parnahyba (243); Resende (no rank); Athletic (no rank); Democrata GV (no rank); Iguatu (no rank); Camboriú (no rank); Águia de Marabá (no rank); Falcon (no rank); Princesa do Solimões (no rank); São Francisco (no rank)

== Format ==
In the first round, each tie was played on a single-legged basis. The lower-ranked team hosted the match. If tied after 90 minutes, the higher-ranked team would automatically advance to second round.

== Matches ==
Times are BRT (UTC−3), as listed by CBF (local times, if different, are in parentheses).

Team 1	Score	Team 2
Campinense	0–2	Grêmio
Resende	1–2	Ferroviário
Fluminense	0–4	Ponte Preta
Cordino	0–2	Brasil de Pelotas
Caldense	0–3	Ceará
Princesa do Solimões	1–1	Ituano
União Rondonópolis	0–1	CRB
Operário	1–0	Operário Ferroviário
Sergipe	1–1	Botafogo
Athletic	1–1	Brasiliense
São Luiz	1–0	Juventude
Vitória	0–1	Remo
ASA	1–1	Goiás
Águia de Marabá	2–1	Botafogo
Tuna Luso	0–1	CSA
Marília	0–3	Brusque
Tocantinópolis	1–1	América Mineiro
Democrata GV	1–1	Santa Cruz
Marcílio Dias	1–0	Chapecoense
Maringá	2–1	Sampaio Corrêa
Jacuipense	1–4	Bahia
Camboriú	1–0	Manaus
Humaitá	0–3	Coritiba
Real Ariquemes	0–3	Criciúma
Atlético de Alagoinhas	0–0	Atlético Goianiense
Falcon	1–3	Volta Redonda
Real Noroeste	1–1	Vila Nova
São Bernardo	0–1	Náutico
Bahia de Feira	1–1	Red Bull Bragantino
São Francisco	1–1	Ypiranga
Trem	0–4	Vasco da Gama
Tuntum	0–5	ABC
Ceilândia	0–1	Santos
Iguatu	1–0	América de Natal
Retrô	3–2	Avaí
Caucaia	0–0	Tombense
São Raimundo	4–3	Cuiabá
Parnahyba	0–0	Botafogo
Nova Iguaçu	2–0	Vitória
Nova Mutum	4–2	Londrina

1 March 2023
20:00

Campinense	0–2	Grêmio
	Report	Cristaldo 26'; Ferreira 86'

Arena BRB Mané Garrincha, Brasília
Referee: Luiz Flávio de Oliveira (São Paulo)

28 February 2023
15:30

Resende	1–2	Ferroviário
Igor Bolt 67'	Report	Alisson 18'; Ciel 30'

Estádio do Trabalhador, Resende
Referee: Murilo Francisco Misson Júnior (Minas Gerais)

28 February 2023
21:30

Fluminense	0–4	Ponte Preta
	Report	Mateus Silva 9'; Lucão 43' (o.g.); Pablo Dyego 54'; Jeh 72'

Estádio Lindolfo Monteiro, Teresina
Referee: Lucas Paulo Torezin (Paraná)

1 March 2023
19:00

Cordino	0–2	Brasil de Pelotas
	Report	Rennan Siqueira 28' (pen.); Patrick 39'

Estádio Municipal Leandro Cláudio da Silva, Barra do Corda
Referee: Dênis da Silva Ribeiro Serafim (Alagoas)

1 March 2023
21:30

Caldense	0–3	Ceará
	Report	Janderson 27'; Vitor Gabriel 46'; Luvannor 86'

Ronaldão, Poços de Caldas
Referee: Dyorgines José Padovani de Andrade (Espírito Santo)

1 March 2023
21:00
(20:00 UTC−4)

Princesa do Solimões	1–1	Ituano
Wesley 90'	Report	Paulo Victor 8'

Estádio Olímpico Municipal Gilberto Mestrinho, Manacapuru
Referee: Yuri Elino Ferreira da Cruz (Rio de Janeiro)

1 March 2023
20:00
(19:00 UTC−4)

União Rondonópolis	0–1	CRB
	Report	Renato 56'

Estádio Engenheiro Luthero Lopes, Rondonópolis
Referee: Leandro Pedro Vuaden (Rio Grande do Sul)

1 March 2023
21:00
(20:00 UTC−4)

Operário	1–0	Operário Ferroviário
Johnny 27'	Report

Estádio Jacques da Luz, Campo Grande
Referee: Emerson Ricardo de Almeida Andrade (Bahia)

2 March 2023
20:00

Sergipe	1–1	Botafogo
Augusto Potiguar 45+1'	Report	Adryelson 90+9'

Batistão, Aracaju
Referee: Bráulio da Silva Machado (Santa Catarina)

1 March 2023
20:00

Athletic	1–1	Brasiliense
Jonathan 89'	Report	Gabriel Henrique 66'

Arena Unimed, São João del-Rei
Referee: Marcelo de Lima Henrique (Ceará)

23 February 2023
19:00

São Luiz	1–0	Juventude
Édipo 53'	Report

Estádio 19 de Outubro, Ijuí
Referee: Luiz Augusto Silveira Tisne (Santa Catarina)

23 February 2023
21:30

Vitória	0–1	Remo
	Report	Muriqui 61'

Estádio Salvador Venâncio da Costa, Vitória
Referee: Bruno Mota Correia (Rio de Janeiro)

1 March 2023
19:00

ASA	1–1	Goiás
Everton Heleno 26'	Report	Sander 17'

Estádio Municipal Coaracy da Mata Fonseca, Arapiraca
Referee: Douglas Marques das Flores (São Paulo)

2 March 2023
16:00

Águia de Marabá	2–1	Botafogo
Luam 45'; Pablo 90+2'	Report	Mateus Anderson 50'

Estádio Municipal Zinho de Oliveira, Marabá
Referee: Ivan da Silva Guimarães Júnior (Amazonas)

1 March 2023
15:30

Tuna Luso	0–1	CSA
	Report	Tomas Bastos 30'

Estádio Francisco Vasques, Belém
Referee: Felipe Fernandes de Lima (Minas Gerais)

22 February 2023
20:00

Marília	0–3	Brusque
	Report	Cleo Silva 1'; Olávio 6'; Everton Bala 21'

Estádio Bento de Abreu, Marília
Referee: Lucas Paulo Torezin (Paraná)

28 February 2023
19:30

Tocantinópolis	1–1	América Mineiro
Chico Bala 47'	Report	Wellington Paulista 9' (pen.)

Estádio João Ribeiro, Tocantinópolis
Referee: Anderson Daronco (Rio Grande do Sul)

28 February 2023
19:30

Democrata GV	1–1	Santa Cruz
Gabriel Vieira 45+1' (pen.)	Report	Pipico 90+4'

Estádio José Mammoud Abbas, Governador Valadares
Referee: João Vitor Gobi (São Paulo)

21 February 2023
19:00

Marcílio Dias	1–0	Chapecoense
Peu 86'	Report

Estádio Doutor Hercílio Luz, Itajaí
Referee: Dyorgines José Padovani de Andrade (Espírito Santo)

2 March 2023
20:00

Maringá	2–1	Sampaio Corrêa
Serginho 18'; Vilar 90+8'	Report	Vinícius Alves 52'

Estádio Willie Davids, Maringá
Referee: Vinícius Gonçalves Dias Araújo (São Paulo)

1 March 2023
21:30

Jacuipense	1–4	Bahia
Thiaguinho 88'	Report	Biel 21'; Raphinha 39' (o.g.); Vítor Jacaré 55'; Cauly 61'

Estádio de Pituaçu, Salvador
Referee: Wagner do Nascimento Magalhães (Rio de Janeiro)

1 March 2023
20:00

Camboriú	1–0	Manaus
Gabriel Tonini 35'	Report

Estádio das Nações, Balneário Camboriú
Referee: Douglas Schwengber da Silva (Rio Grande do Sul)

23 February 2023
19:00
(17:00 UTC−5)

Humaitá	0–3	Coritiba
	Report	Alef Manga 9' (pen.); Kaio César 27'; Robson 82'

Estádio Antônio Aquino Lopes, Rio Branco
Referee: Vinícius Gonçalves Dias Araújo (São Paulo)

2 March 2023
20:00
(19:00 UTC−4)

Real Ariquemes	0–3	Criciúma
	Report	Claudinho 45+2'; Éder 62'; Fabinho 82'

Estádio Gentil Valério, Ariquemes
Referee: Caio Max Augusto Vieira (Rio Grande do Norte)

1 March 2023
19:00

Atlético de Alagoinhas	0–0	Atlético Goianiense
	Report

Estádio Municipal Antônio de Figueiredo Carneiro, Alagoinhas
Referee: Thiago Luís Scarascati (São Paulo)

22 February 2023
16:00

Falcon	1–3	Volta Redonda
Ronald 42'	Report	Lelê 51'; Dudu 54'; Sandro 83'

Batistão, Aracaju
Referee: Léo Simão Holanda (Ceará)

28 February 2023
20:00

Real Noroeste	1–1	Vila Nova
Dudu Pedrotti 46'	Report	Lourenço 65'

Estádio José Olímpio da Rocha, Águia Branca
Referee: José Mendonça da Silva Júnior (Paraná)

1 March 2023
20:00

São Bernardo	0–1	Náutico
	Report	Denílson 3'

Estádio 1º de Maio, São Bernardo do Campo
Referee: Paulo Roberto Alves Júnior (Paraná)

1 March 2023
19:00

Bahia de Feira	1–1	Red Bull Bragantino
Peterson 4'	Report	Bruninho 60'

Estádio Jodilton Souza, Feira de Santana
Referee: Bruno Arleu de Araújo (Rio de Janeiro)

22 February 2023
21:00
(19:00 UTC−5)

São Francisco	1–1	Ypiranga
Vicente 41'	Report	Bruno Baio 75'

Estádio Antônio Aquino Lopes, Rio Branco
Referee: Maguielson Lima Barbosa (Distrito Federal)

23 February 2023
21:30

Trem	0–4	Vasco da Gama
	Report	Erick Marcus 12'; Pedro Raul 28'; Nenê 60'; Jair 90+4'

Arena BRB Mané Garrincha, Brasília
Referee: Sávio Pereira Sampaio (Distrito Federal)

1 March 2023
19:00

Tuntum	0–5	ABC
	Report	Raphael Luz 17'; Rafael Silva 45+5', 53'; Cloves 47' (o.g.); Walfrido 87'

Estádio Rafael Seabra, Tuntum
Referee: Maguielson Lima Barbosa (Distrito Federal)

23 February 2023
20:00

Ceilândia	0–1	Santos
	Report	Joaquim 73'

Serejão, Taguatinga
Referee: Ramon Abatti Abel (Santa Catarina)

2 March 2023
19:15

Iguatu	1–0	América de Natal
Calcinha 77'	Report

Estádio João Elmo Moreno Cavalcante, Iguatu
Referee: Diego da Costa Cidral (Santa Catarina)

1 March 2023
21:30

Retrô	3–2	Avaí
William Marcilio 27'; Fernandinho 74', 87'	Report	Lucas Silva 25'; Gustavo Modesto 78'

Arena Pernambuco, São Lourenço da Mata
Referee: Rafael Rodrigo Klein (Rio Grande do Sul)

22 February 2023
19:00

Caucaia	0–0	Tombense
	Report

Estádio Municipal João Ronaldo, Pacajus
Referee: José Jaini Oliveira Bispo (Alagoas)

22 February 2023
19:00
(18:00 UTC−4)

São Raimundo	4–3	Cuiabá
Allan Rosário 2', 35', 90+1'; Tavinho 15'	Report	Iury Castilho 21'; Alan Empereur 67'; Mateusinho 85'

Estádio Canarinho, Boa Vista
Referee: Emerson Ricardo de Almeida Andrade (Bahia)

1 March 2023
20:00

Parnahyba	0–0	Botafogo
	Report

Estádio Pedro Alelaf, Parnaíba
Referee: Diego Pombo Lopez (Bahia)

1 March 2023
15:30

Nova Iguaçu	2–0	Vitória
Léo Índio 68' (pen.); Márcio Duarte 82'	Report

Estádio Jânio Moraes, Nova Iguaçu
Referee: Jefferson Ferreira de Moraes (Goiás)

22 February 2023
17:00
(16:00 UTC−4)

Nova Mutum	4–2	Londrina
Lorran 14', 20', 53'; Felipinho 23'	Report	Felipe Vieira 13'; Júnior Dutra 29'

Estádio Municipal Valdir Doilho Wons, Nova Mutum
Referee: Paulo Henrique de Melo Salmazio (Mato Grosso do Sul)
