= 2023 Copa do Brasil =

Tournament details
- Country: Brazil
- Dates: 21 February – 24 September
- Teams: 92

Final positions
- Champions: São Paulo (1st title)
- Runners-up: Flamengo
- 2024 Copa Libertadores: São Paulo

Tournament statistics
- Matches played: 122
- Goals scored: 304 (2.49 per match)
- Top goal scorer(s): Pedro; Alef Manga; Lorran; Tiquinho Soares (5 goals each)

Awards
- Best player: Rodrigo Nestor (São Paulo)

The 2023 Copa do Brasil (officially the Copa Betano do Brasil 2023 for sponsorship reasons) was the 35th edition of the Copa do Brasil football competition. It was held between 21 February and 24 September 2023.

The competition was contested by 92 teams, either qualified by participating in their respective state championships (70), by the 2023 CBF ranking (10), by the 2022 Copa do Nordeste (1), by the 2022 Copa Verde (1), by the 2022 Série B (1), by the 2022 Série A (1) or those qualified for 2023 Copa Libertadores (8).

In the final, São Paulo defeated the defending champions Flamengo to win their first title. As champions, São Paulo qualified for the 2024 Copa Libertadores group stage and the 2024 Supercopa do Brasil.

== Qualified teams ==
Teams in bold are qualified directly for the third round.

| Association | Team | Qualification method |
|---|---|---|
| Acre; 2 berths | Humaitá | 2022 Campeonato Acreano champions |
| Acre; 2 berths | São Francisco | 2022 Campeonato Acreano runners-up |
| Alagoas; 3 berths | CRB | 2022 Campeonato Alagoano champions |
| Alagoas; 3 berths | ASA | 2022 Campeonato Alagoano runners-up |
| Alagoas; 3 berths | CSA | 2023 Copa do Brasil play-off winners |
| Amapá; 1 berth | Trem | 2022 Campeonato Amapaense champions |
| Amazonas; 2 berths | Manaus | 2022 Campeonato Amazonense champions |
| Amazonas; 2 berths | Princesa do Solimões | 2022 Campeonato Amazonense runners-up |
| Bahia; 3 + 2 berths | Atlético de Alagoinhas | 2022 Campeonato Baiano champions |
| Bahia; 3 + 2 berths | Jacuipense | 2022 Campeonato Baiano runners-up |
| Bahia; 3 + 2 berths | Bahia de Feira | 2022 Campeonato Baiano 3rd place |
| Bahia; 3 + 2 berths | Bahia | 4th best placed team in the 2022 CBF ranking not already qualified |
| Bahia; 3 + 2 berths | Vitória | 8th best placed team in the 2022 CBF ranking not already qualified |
| Ceará; 3 + 1 + 1 berths | **Fortaleza** | **2022 Campeonato Brasileiro Série A 8th place** |
| Ceará; 3 + 1 + 1 berths | Caucaia | 2022 Campeonato Cearense first round winners |
| Ceará; 3 + 1 + 1 berths | Ferroviário | 2022 Campeonato Cearense 3rd place |
| Ceará; 3 + 1 + 1 berths | Iguatu^{[a]} | 2022 Campeonato Cearense 4th place |
| Ceará; 3 + 1 + 1 berths | Ceará | 3rd best placed team in the 2022 CBF ranking not already qualified |
| Espírito Santo; 2 berths | Real Noroeste | 2022 Campeonato Capixaba champions |
| Espírito Santo; 2 berths | Vitória | 2022 Copa Espírito Santo champions |
| Federal District; 2 berths | Brasiliense | 2022 Campeonato Brasiliense champions |
| Federal District; 2 berths | Ceilândia | 2022 Campeonato Brasiliense runners-up |
| Goiás; 3 berths | Atlético Goianiense | 2022 Campeonato Goiano champions |
| Goiás; 3 berths | Goiás | 2022 Campeonato Goiano runners-up |
| Goiás; 3 berths | Vila Nova | 2022 Campeonato Goiano 3rd place |
| Maranhão; 3 berths | Sampaio Corrêa | 2022 Campeonato Maranhense champions |
| Maranhão; 3 berths | Cordino | 2022 Campeonato Maranhense runners-up |
| Maranhão; 3 berths | Tuntum | 2022 Copa Federação Maranhense de Futebol champions |
| Mato Grosso; 3 berths | Cuiabá | 2022 Campeonato Mato-Grossense champions |
| Mato Grosso; 3 berths | União Rondonópolis | 2022 Campeonato Mato-Grossense runners-up |
| Mato Grosso; 3 berths | Nova Mutum | 2022 Copa FMF champions |
| Mato Grosso do Sul 1 berth | Operário | 2022 Campeonato Sul-Mato-Grossense champions |
| Minas Gerais; 4 + 2 + 1 berths | **Atlético Mineiro** | **2022 Campeonato Brasileiro Série A 7th place** |
| Minas Gerais; 4 + 2 + 1 berths | **Cruzeiro** | **2022 Campeonato Brasileiro Série B champions** |
| Minas Gerais; 4 + 2 + 1 berths | Athletic | 2022 Campeonato Mineiro 3rd place |
| Minas Gerais; 4 + 2 + 1 berths | Caldense | 2022 Campeonato Mineiro 4th place |
| Minas Gerais; 4 + 2 + 1 berths | Democrata GV | 2022 Troféu Inconfidência winners |
| Minas Gerais; 4 + 2 + 1 berths | Tombense | 2022 Troféu Inconfidência runners-up |
| Minas Gerais; 4 + 2 + 1 berths | América Mineiro | 2nd best placed team in the 2022 CBF ranking not already qualified |
| Pará; 3 + 1 berths | **Paysandu** | **2022 Copa Verde champions** |
| Pará; 3 + 1 berths | Remo | 2022 Campeonato Paraense champions |
| Pará; 3 + 1 berths | Tuna Luso | 2022 Campeonato Paraense 3rd place |
| Pará; 3 + 1 berths | Águia de Marabá | 2022 Campeonato Paraense 4th place |
| Paraíba; 2 berths | Campinense | 2022 Campeonato Paraibano champions |
| Paraíba; 2 berths | Botafogo | 2022 Campeonato Paraibano runners-up |
| Paraná; 4 + 1 berths | **Athletico Paranaense** | **2022 Campeonato Brasileiro Série A 6th place** |
| Paraná; 4 + 1 berths | Coritiba | 2022 Campeonato Paranaense champions |
| Paraná; 4 + 1 berths | Maringá | 2022 Campeonato Paranaense runners-up |
| Paraná; 4 + 1 berths | Operário Ferroviário | 2022 Campeonato Paranaense 3rd place |
| Paraná; 4 + 1 berths | Londrina | 2022 Campeonato Paranaense 5th place |
| Pernambuco; 3 + 1 berths | **Sport** | **2022 Copa do Nordeste runners-up** |
| Pernambuco; 3 + 1 berths | Náutico | 2022 Campeonato Pernambucano champions |
| Pernambuco; 3 + 1 berths | Retrô | 2022 Campeonato Pernambucano runners-up |
| Pernambuco; 3 + 1 berths | Santa Cruz | 2022 Campeonato Pernambucano first round best placed team not already qualified |
| Piauí; 2 berths | Fluminense | 2022 Campeonato Piauiense champions |
| Piauí; 2 berths | Parnahyba | 2022 Campeonato Piauiense runners-up |
| Rio de Janeiro; 5 + 2 berths | **Flamengo** | **2022 Copa Libertadores champions** |
| Rio de Janeiro; 5 + 2 berths | **Fluminense** | **2022 Campeonato Brasileiro Série A 3rd place** |
| Rio de Janeiro; 5 + 2 berths | Vasco da Gama | 2022 Campeonato Carioca 3rd place |
| Rio de Janeiro; 5 + 2 berths | Botafogo | 2022 Campeonato Carioca 4th place |
| Rio de Janeiro; 5 + 2 berths | Nova Iguaçu | 2022 Torneio Independência champions |
| Rio de Janeiro; 5 + 2 berths | Resende | 2022 Torneio Independência runners-up |
| Rio de Janeiro; 5 + 2 berths | Volta Redonda | 2022 Copa Rio champions |
| Rio Grande do Norte 2 berths | ABC | 2022 Campeonato Potiguar champions |
| Rio Grande do Norte 2 berths | América de Natal | 2022 Campeonato Potiguar runners-up |
| Rio Grande do Sul; 4 + 1 + 1 berths | **Internacional** | **2022 Campeonato Brasileiro Série A runners-up** |
| Rio Grande do Sul; 4 + 1 + 1 berths | Grêmio | 2022 Campeonato Gaúcho champions |
| Rio Grande do Sul; 4 + 1 + 1 berths | Ypiranga | 2022 Campeonato Gaúcho runners-up |
| Rio Grande do Sul; 4 + 1 + 1 berths | Brasil de Pelotas | 2022 Campeonato Gaúcho 4th place |
| Rio Grande do Sul; 4 + 1 + 1 berths | São Luiz | 2022 Copa FGF champions |
| Rio Grande do Sul; 4 + 1 + 1 berths | Juventude | 5th best placed team in the 2022 CBF ranking not already qualified |
| Rondônia; 1 berth | Real Ariquemes | 2022 Campeonato Rondoniense champions |
| Roraima; 1 berth | São Raimundo | 2022 Campeonato Roraimense champions |
| Santa Catarina; 3 + 3 berths | Brusque | 2022 Campeonato Catarinense champions |
| Santa Catarina; 3 + 3 berths | Camboriú | 2022 Campeonato Catarinense runners-up |
| Santa Catarina; 3 + 3 berths | Marcílio Dias | 2022 Copa Santa Catarina champions |
| Santa Catarina; 3 + 3 berths | Chapecoense | 6th best placed team in the 2022 CBF ranking not already qualified |
| Santa Catarina; 3 + 3 berths | Avaí | 7th best placed team in the 2022 CBF ranking not already qualified |
| Santa Catarina; 3 + 3 berths | Criciúma^{[b]} | 10th best placed team in the 2022 CBF ranking not already qualified |
| São Paulo; 5 + 3 + 2 berths | **Palmeiras** | **2022 Campeonato Brasileiro Série A champions** |
| São Paulo; 5 + 3 + 2 berths | **Corinthians** | **2022 Campeonato Brasileiro Série A 4th place** |
| São Paulo; 5 + 3 + 2 berths | **São Paulo** | **2022 Campeonato Brasileiro Série A 9th place** |
| São Paulo; 5 + 3 + 2 berths | Red Bull Bragantino | 2022 Campeonato Paulista 4th place |
| São Paulo; 5 + 3 + 2 berths | Ituano | 2022 Campeonato Paulista 5th place |
| São Paulo; 5 + 3 + 2 berths | São Bernardo | 2022 Campeonato Paulista 6th place |
| São Paulo; 5 + 3 + 2 berths | Botafogo | 2022 Troféu do Interior runners-up |
| São Paulo; 5 + 3 + 2 berths | Marília | 2022 Copa Paulista runners-up |
| São Paulo; 5 + 3 + 2 berths | Santos | best placed team in the 2022 CBF ranking not already qualified |
| São Paulo; 5 + 3 + 2 berths | Ponte Preta | 9th best placed team in the 2022 CBF ranking not already qualified |
| Sergipe; 2 berths | Sergipe | 2022 Campeonato Sergipano champions |
| Sergipe; 2 berths | Falcon | 2022 Campeonato Sergipano runners-up |
| Tocantins; 1 berth | Tocantinópolis | 2022 Campeonato Tocantinense champions |

^{a} Originally, Pacajus qualified for the Copa do Brasil by winning the 2022 Copa Fares Lopes, however, CBF announced that the 2022 Copa Fares Lopes did not meet the requirements as Copa do Brasil qualification tournament. CBF awarded the berth to the best placed team in the 2022 Campeonato Cearense not already qualified, Iguatu (2022 Campeonato Cearense 4th place).
^{b} As Guarani (São Paulo) and Criciúma (Santa Catarina) had the same number of points in the CBF ranking, a draw to determine the qualified team was held on 16 January 2023, 15:00 at CBF headquarters in Rio de Janeiro.

== Format ==
The competition is a single-elimination tournament, the first two rounds are played as a single match and the rest are played as a two-legged ties. Twelve teams enter in the third round, which are teams qualified for 2023 Copa Libertadores (8), Série A best team not qualified for 2023 Copa Libertadores, Série B champions, Copa Verde champions and Copa do Nordeste runners-up. The remaining 80 teams play in the first round, the 40 winners play the second round, and the 20 winners play the third round. Finally, the sixteen third round winners advance to the round of 16.

== Schedule ==
The schedule of the competition was as follows:

| Stage | First leg | Second leg |
|---|---|---|
| First round | Week 1: 22 February; Week 2: 1 March | |
| Second round | Week 1: 8 March; Week 2: 15 March | |
| Third round | 12 April | 26 April |
| Round of 16 | 17 May | 31 May |
| Quarter-finals | 5 July | 12 July |
| Semi-finals | 26 July | 16 August |
| Finals | 17 September | 24 September |

== Draw ==
The draw for the first and second rounds was held on 8 February 2023, 14:00 at CBF headquarters in Rio de Janeiro. Teams were seeded by their CBF ranking (shown in parentheses). The 80 qualified teams were divided in eight groups (A-H) with 10 teams each. The matches were drawn from the respective confronts: A vs. E; B vs. F; C vs. G; D vs. H. The lower-ranked teams hosted the first round match.

| Group A | Group B | Group C | Group D |
|---|---|---|---|
| Santos (9); Grêmio (11); América Mineiro (12); Atlético Goianiense (13); Ceará (14); Bahia (15); Botafogo (16); Red Bull Bragantino (17); Goiás (19); Cuiabá (20) | Juventude (21); Vasco da Gama (22); Coritiba (23); Chapecoense (24); Avaí (25); CRB (27); CSA (28); Vitória (29); Vila Nova (30); Ponte Preta (31) | Sampaio Corrêa (32); Criciúma (33); Operário Ferroviário (35); Londrina (36); Náutico (37); Remo (38); Tombense (39); Brasil de Pelotas (40); Brusque (41); ABC (44) | Ituano (46); Botafogo (48); Manaus (49); Volta Redonda (52); Ypiranga (53); Ferroviário (54); Botafogo (56); Santa Cruz (59); Brasiliense (61); América de Natal (62) |
| Group E | Group F | Group G | Group H |
| Campinense (64); Jacuipense (67); São Raimundo (73); Tocantinópolis (76); Bahia de Feira (80); Caldense (84); Atlético de Alagoinhas (85); ASA (87); Sergipe (88); Ceilândia (91) | União Rondonópolis (93); Real Noroeste (96); Retrô (98); Marcílio Dias (101); Tuna Luso (118); Fluminense (118); São Luiz (121); Nova Iguaçu (127); Humaitá (132); Trem (132) | São Bernardo (145); Vitória (145); Nova Mutum (148); Tuntum (166); Caucaia (168); Real Ariquemes (171); Maringá (185); Operário (200); Marília (214); Cordino (220) | Parnahyba (243); Resende (no rank); Athletic (no rank); Democrata GV (no rank); Iguatu (no rank); Camboriú (no rank); Águia de Marabá (no rank); Falcon (no rank); Princesa do Solimões (no rank); São Francisco (no rank) |

== First round ==
In the first round, each tie was played on a single-legged basis. The lower-ranked team hosted the match. If tied after 90 minutes, the higher-ranked team would automatically advance to second round.

| Team 1 | Score | Team 2 |
|---|---|---|
| Campinense | 0–2 | Grêmio |
| Resende | 1–2 | Ferroviário |
| Fluminense | 0–4 | Ponte Preta |
| Cordino | 0–2 | Brasil de Pelotas |
| Caldense | 0–3 | Ceará |
| Princesa do Solimões | 1–1 | Ituano |
| União Rondonópolis | 0–1 | CRB |
| Operário | 1–0 | Operário Ferroviário |
| Sergipe | 1–1 | Botafogo |
| Athletic | 1–1 | Brasiliense |
| São Luiz | 1–0 | Juventude |
| Vitória | 0–1 | Remo |
| ASA | 1–1 | Goiás |
| Águia de Marabá | 2–1 | Botafogo |
| Tuna Luso | 0–1 | CSA |
| Marília | 0–3 | Brusque |
| Tocantinópolis | 1–1 | América Mineiro |
| Democrata GV | 1–1 | Santa Cruz |
| Marcílio Dias | 1–0 | Chapecoense |
| Maringá | 2–1 | Sampaio Corrêa |
| Jacuipense | 1–4 | Bahia |
| Camboriú | 1–0 | Manaus |
| Humaitá | 0–3 | Coritiba |
| Real Ariquemes | 0–3 | Criciúma |
| Atlético de Alagoinhas | 0–0 | Atlético Goianiense |
| Falcon | 1–3 | Volta Redonda |
| Real Noroeste | 1–1 | Vila Nova |
| São Bernardo | 0–1 | Náutico |
| Bahia de Feira | 1–1 | Red Bull Bragantino |
| São Francisco | 1–1 | Ypiranga |
| Trem | 0–4 | Vasco da Gama |
| Tuntum | 0–5 | ABC |
| Ceilândia | 0–1 | Santos |
| Iguatu | 1–0 | América de Natal |
| Retrô | 3–2 | Avaí |
| Caucaia | 0–0 | Tombense |
| São Raimundo | 4–3 | Cuiabá |
| Parnahyba | 0–0 | Botafogo |
| Nova Iguaçu | 2–0 | Vitória |
| Nova Mutum | 4–2 | Londrina |

== Second round ==
In the second round, each tie was played on a single-legged basis. If the score was level, the match would go straight to the penalty shoot-out to determine the winners.

| Team 1 | Score | Team 2 |
|---|---|---|
| Grêmio | 3–0 | Ferroviário |
| Brasil de Pelotas | 2–0 | Ponte Preta |
| Ituano | 1–1 (4–2p) | Ceará |
| CRB | 5–0 | Operário |
| Botafogo | 7–1 | Brasiliense |
| Remo | 2–1 | São Luiz |
| Águia de Marabá | 0–0 (7–6p) | Goiás |
| CSA | 1–0 | Brusque |
| América Mineiro | 1–0 | Santa Cruz |
| Maringá | 2–0 | Marcílio Dias |
| Camboriú | 0–1 | Bahia |
| Coritiba | 1–1 (6–5p) | Criciúma |
| Atlético Goianiense | 1–1 (4–5p) | Volta Redonda |
| Náutico | 2–1 | Vila Nova |
| Ypiranga | 3–1 | Red Bull Bragantino |
| Vasco da Gama | 0–0 (5–6p) | ABC |
| Santos | 3–0 | Iguatu |
| Tombense | 1–0 | Retrô |
| Botafogo | 3–1 | São Raimundo |
| Nova Iguaçu | 5–2 | Nova Mutum |

== Third round ==
The draw for the third round was held on 29 March 2023, 14:00 at CBF headquarters in Rio de Janeiro. In a first draw, the 32 teams, seeded by their CBF ranking, were drawn into 16 ties. The home and away teams of each leg were decided in a second draw. CBF ranking is shown in parentheses.

| Pot A | Pot B |
|---|---|
| Flamengo (1); Palmeiras (2); Athletico Paranaense (3); Atlético Mineiro (4); São Paulo (5); Fluminense (6); Fortaleza (7); Corinthians (8); Santos (9); Internacional (10); Grêmio (11); América Mineiro (12); Bahia (15); Botafogo (16); Cruzeiro (18); Coritiba (23) | Sport (26); CRB (27); CSA (28); Náutico (37); Remo (38); Tombense (39); Brasil de Pelotas (40); Paysandu (43); ABC (44); Ituano (46); Botafogo (48); Volta Redonda (52); Ypiranga (53); Nova Iguaçu (127); Maringá (185); Águia de Marabá (no rank) |

In the third round, each tie was played on a home-and-away two-legged basis. If the aggregate score was level, the second-leg match would go straight to the penalty shoot-out to determine the winners.

| Team 1 | Agg. | Team 2 | 1st leg | 2nd leg |
|---|---|---|---|---|
| Botafogo | 0–3 | Santos | 0–2 | 0–1 |
| Nova Iguaçu | 1–7 | América Mineiro | 1–2 | 0–5 |
| Coritiba | 3–5 | Sport | 3–3 | 0–2 |
| Náutico | 1–2 | Cruzeiro | 1–0 | 0–2 |
| Atlético Mineiro | 3–2 | Brasil de Pelotas | 2–1 | 1–1 |
| Volta Redonda | 1–6 | Bahia | 1–2 | 0–4 |
| Ypiranga | 0–4 | Botafogo | 0–2 | 0–2 |
| ABC | 1–3 | Grêmio | 0–2 | 1–1 |
| Maringá | 4–8 | Flamengo | 2–0 | 2–8 |
| São Paulo | 1–0 | Ituano | 0–0 | 1–0 |
| Fluminense | 6–0 | Paysandu | 3–0 | 3–0 |
| Remo | 2–2 (4–5 p) | Corinthians | 2–0 | 0–2 |
| Internacional | 3–3 (7–6 p) | CSA | 2–1 | 1–2 |
| Fortaleza | 8–1 | Águia de Marabá | 6–1 | 2–0 |
| CRB | 2–2 (2–4 p) | Athletico Paranaense | 1–0 | 1–2 |
| Palmeiras | 5–3 | Tombense | 4–2 | 1–1 |

== Final rounds ==
=== Bracket ===
Round of 16
(São Paulo (state)) Santos | 0 | 1 | 1 (3)
Bahia (p) | 0 | 1 | 1 (4)
(Rio Grande do Sul) Grêmio | 1 | 1 | 2
(Minas Gerais) Cruzeiro | 1 | 0 | 1
(Rio de Janeiro (state)) Fluminense | 0 | 0 | 0
(Rio de Janeiro (state)) Flamengo | 0 | 2 | 2
(Paraná (state)) Athletico Paranaense (p) | 3 | 0 | 3 (4)
(Rio de Janeiro (state)) Botafogo | 2 | 1 | 3 (2)
(Minas Gerais) América Mineiro (p) | 2 | 1 | 3 (5)
(Rio Grande do Sul) Internacional | 0 | 3 | 3 (4)
(Minas Gerais) Atlético Mineiro | 2 | 0 | 2 (1)
(São Paulo (state)) Corinthians (p) | 0 | 2 | 2 (3)
(Pernambuco) Sport | 0 | 3 | 3 (3)
(São Paulo (state)) São Paulo (p) | 2 | 1 | 3 (5)
(São Paulo (state)) Palmeiras | 3 | 0 | 3
(Ceará) Fortaleza | 0 | 1 | 1

Quarter-finals
Bahia | 1 | 1 | 2 (3)
(Rio Grande do Sul) Grêmio (p) | 1 | 1 | 2 (4)
(Rio de Janeiro (state)) Flamengo | 2 | 2 | 4
(Paraná (state)) Athletico Paranaense | 1 | 0 | 1
(Minas Gerais) América Mineiro | 1 | 2 | 3 (1)
(São Paulo (state)) Corinthians (p) | 0 | 3 | 3 (3)
(São Paulo (state)) São Paulo | 1 | 2 | 3
(São Paulo (state)) Palmeiras | 0 | 1 | 1

Semi-finals
(Rio Grande do Sul) Grêmio | 0 | 0 | 0
(Rio de Janeiro (state)) Flamengo | 2 | 1 | 3
(São Paulo (state)) Corinthians | 2 | 0 | 2
(São Paulo (state)) São Paulo | 1 | 2 | 3

Finals
(Rio de Janeiro (state)) Flamengo | 0 | 1 | 1
(São Paulo (state)) São Paulo | 1 | 1 | 2

=== Round of 16 ===
| Team 1 | Agg. | Team 2 | 1st leg | 2nd leg |
|---|---|---|---|---|
| América Mineiro | 3–3 (5–4 p) | Internacional | 2–0 | 1–3 |
| Sport | 3–3 (3–5 p) | São Paulo | 0–2 | 3–1 |
| Athletico Paranaense | 3–3 (4–2 p) | Botafogo | 3–2 | 0–1 |
| Fluminense | 0–2 | Flamengo | 0–0 | 0–2 |
| Santos | 1–1 (3–4 p) | Bahia | 0–0 | 1–1 |
| Palmeiras | 3–1 | Fortaleza | 3–0 | 0–1 |
| Atlético Mineiro | 2–2 (1–3 p) | Corinthians | 2–0 | 0–2 |
| Grêmio | 2–1 | Cruzeiro | 1–1 | 1–0 |

=== Quarter-finals ===
| Team 1 | Agg. | Team 2 | 1st leg | 2nd leg |
|---|---|---|---|---|
| Grêmio | 2–2 (4–3 p) | Bahia | 1–1 | 1–1 |
| Palmeiras | 1–3 | São Paulo | 0–1 | 1–2 |
| Corinthians | 3–3 (3–1 p) | América Mineiro | 0–1 | 3–2 |
| Athletico Paranaense | 1–4 | Flamengo | 1–2 | 0–2 |

=== Semi-finals ===
| Team 1 | Agg. | Team 2 | 1st leg | 2nd leg |
|---|---|---|---|---|
| São Paulo | 3–2 | Corinthians | 1–2 | 2–0 |
| Flamengo | 3–0 | Grêmio | 2–0 | 1–0 |

=== Finals ===
17 September 2023
16:00 UTC−3

| Flamengo (Rio de Janeiro (state)) | 0–1 | (São Paulo (state)) São Paulo |
|---|---|---|
| | Report | Calleri 45+1' |

Maracanã, Rio de Janeiro
Attendance: 67,350
Referee: Anderson Daronco (Rio Grande do Sul)

24 September 2023
16:00 UTC−3

| São Paulo (São Paulo (state)) | 1–1 | (Rio de Janeiro (state)) Flamengo |
|---|---|---|
| Rodrigo Nestor 45+5' | Report | Bruno Henrique 44' |

Morumbi, São Paulo
Attendance: 63,077
Referee: Bráulio da Silva Machado (Santa Catarina)

2023 Copa do Brasil winners
São Paulo
1st Title

== Top goalscorers ==
| Rank | Player | Team | Goals |
|---|---|---|---|
| 1 | (Brazil) Pedro | Flamengo | 5 |
| 1 | (Brazil) Alef Manga | Coritiba | 5 |
| 1 | (Brazil) Lorran | Nova Mutum | 5 |
| 1 | (Brazil) Tiquinho Soares | Botafogo | 5 |
| 4 | (China) Aloísio | América Mineiro | 4 |
| 4 | (Brazil) Renato | CRB | 4 |
| 7 | (Brazil) Alan Patrick | Internacional | 3 |
| 7 | (Brazil) Allan Rosário | São Raimundo | 3 |
| 7 | (Brazil) Biel | Bahia | 3 |
| 7 | (Brazil) Carlos Eduardo | Botafogo | 3 |
| 7 | (Brazil) Cauly | Bahia | 3 |
| 7 | (Brazil) Marcos Leonardo | Santos | 3 |
| 7 | (Brazil) Serginho | Maringá | 3 |

=== Team of the tournament ===
| Position | Player | Team |
|---|---|---|
| Goalkeeper | (Brazil) Rafael | (Brazil) São Paulo |
| Defenders | (Brazil) Rafinha | (Brazil) São Paulo |
| Defenders | (Brazil) Fabrício Bruno | (Brazil) Flamengo |
| Defenders | (Brazil) Beraldo | (Brazil) São Paulo |
| Defenders | (Brazil) Caio Paulista | (Brazil) São Paulo |
| Midfielders | (Brazil) Renato Augusto | (Brazil) Corinthians |
| Midfielders | (Paraguay) Mathías Villasanti | (Brazil) Grêmio |
| Midfielders | (Brazil) Rodrigo Nestor | (Brazil) São Paulo |
| Midfielders | (Uruguay) Giorgian de Arrascaeta | (Brazil) Flamengo |
| Forwards | (Brazil) Wellington Rato | (Brazil) São Paulo |
| Forwards | (Brazil) Bruno Henrique | (Brazil) Flamengo |
