= 2023 Copa do Brasil second round =

Football competition in Brazil

The 2023 Copa do Brasil second round was the second round of the 2023 Copa do Brasil football competition. It was played from 7 to 16 March 2023. A total of 40 teams competed in the second round to decide 20 places in the third round of the 2023 Copa do Brasil.

== Format ==
In the second round, each tie was played on a single-legged basis. If the score was level, the match would go straight to the penalty shoot-out to determine the winners. Host teams were settled in the first-round draw.

== Matches ==
Times are BRT (UTC−3), as listed by CBF (local times, if different, are in parentheses).

Team 1	Score	Team 2
Grêmio	3–0	Ferroviário
Brasil de Pelotas	2–0	Ponte Preta
Ituano	1–1 (4–2p)	Ceará
CRB	5–0	Operário
Botafogo	7–1	Brasiliense
Remo	2–1	São Luiz
Águia de Marabá	0–0 (7–6p)	Goiás
CSA	1–0	Brusque
América Mineiro	1–0	Santa Cruz
Maringá	2–0	Marcílio Dias
Camboriú	0–1	Bahia
Coritiba	1–1 (6–5p)	Criciúma
Atlético Goianiense	1–1 (4–5p)	Volta Redonda
Náutico	2–1	Vila Nova
Ypiranga	3–1	Red Bull Bragantino
Vasco da Gama	0–0 (5–6p)	ABC
Santos	3–0	Iguatu
Tombense	1–0	Retrô
Botafogo	3–1	São Raimundo
Nova Iguaçu	5–2	Nova Mutum

16 March 2023
20:00

Grêmio	3–0	Ferroviário
Bruno Alves 45+2'; Suárez 55'; Ferreira 72'	Report

Arena do Grêmio, Porto Alegre
Referee: Bruno Arleu de Araújo (Rio de Janeiro)

7 March 2023
20:00

Brasil de Pelotas	2–0	Ponte Preta
Márcio Jonatan 12'; Luiz Felipe 52'	Report

Estádio Bento Freitas, Pelotas
Referee: Felipe Fernandes de Lima (Minas Gerais)

15 March 2023
19:00

Ituano	1–1	Ceará
Quirino 43'	Report	Guilherme Castilho 15'
Penalties
Jefferson Paulino (penalty scored); Rafael Silva (penalty scored); José Aldo (penalty scored); Rafael Pereira (penalty scored)	4–2	(penalty missed) Jean Carlos; (penalty scored) Arthur Rezende; (penalty scored) Luvannor; (penalty missed) Janderson

Estádio Novelli Júnior, Itu
Referee: Leandro Pedro Vuaden (Rio Grande do Sul)

15 March 2023
19:30

CRB	5–0	Operário
Anselmo Ramon 5'; Mike 10'; Renato 17', 21', 38'	Report

Estádio Rei Pelé, Maceió
Referee: Vinícius Gonçalves Dias Araújo (São Paulo)

15 March 2023
20:00

Botafogo	7–1	Brasiliense
Danilo Barbosa 5'; Carlos Eduardo 10'; Adryelson 45+2'; Cuesta 51'; Tiquinho Soares 76', 84', 86'	Report	Yuri Mamute 41'

Estádio Kléber Andrade, Cariacica
Referee: Anderson Daronco (Rio Grande do Sul)

8 March 2023
20:00

Remo	2–1	São Luiz
Ícaro 27' (pen.); Moisés 67' (o.g.)	Report	Negueba 89' (pen.)

Baenão, Belém
Referee: Rodrigo José Pereira de Lima (Pernambuco)

15 March 2023
19:00

Águia de Marabá	0–0	Goiás
	Report
Penalties
Pablo (penalty scored); Carlos Maranhão (penalty missed); Danilo Cirqueira (penalty scored); David Cruz (penalty scored); Betão (penalty missed); Wander (penalty missed); Bruno Limão (penalty scored); Maicon Firmino (penalty scored); Luam (penalty scored); Castro (penalty scored)	7–6	(penalty scored) Vinícius; (penalty scored) Lucas Halter; (penalty missed) Alesson; (penalty missed) Zé Ricardo; (penalty scored) Philippe Costa; (penalty missed) Felipe; (penalty scored) Tadeu; (penalty scored) Sander; (penalty scored) Sidimar; (penalty missed) Maguinho

Estádio Municipal Zinho de Oliveira, Marabá
Referee: Luiz Flávio de Oliveira (São Paulo)

16 March 2023
19:00

CSA	1–0	Brusque
Gabriel Taliari 71'	Report

Estádio Rei Pelé, Maceió
Referee: Caio Max Augusto Vieira (Rio Grande do Norte)

14 March 2023
21:30

América Mineiro	1–0	Santa Cruz
Benítez 45+1'	Report

Arena Independência, Belo Horizonte
Referee: Ramon Abatti Abel (Santa Catarina)

14 March 2023
20:00

Maringá	2–0	Marcílio Dias
Everton Morelli 15'; Robertinho 45+1'	Report

Estádio Willie Davids, Maringá
Referee: Yuri Elino Ferreira da Cruz (Rio de Janeiro)

8 March 2023
19:00

Camboriú	0–1	Bahia
	Report	Biel 10'

Estádio das Nações, Balneário Camboriú
Referee: Flávio Rodrigues de Souza (São Paulo)

14 March 2023
20:00

Coritiba	1–1	Criciúma
Alef Manga 85'	Report	Marquinhos Gabriel 1'
Penalties
Bruno Gomes (penalty scored); Victor Luis (penalty scored); Bruno Viana (penalty scored); Matheus Cadorini (penalty scored); Alef Manga (penalty scored); Régis (penalty scored)	6–5	(penalty scored) Fellipe Mateus; (penalty scored) Crystopher; (penalty scored) Lohan; (penalty scored) Claudinho; (penalty scored) Arilson; (penalty missed) Hélder Santos

Estádio Couto Pereira, Curitiba
Referee: Flávio Rodrigues de Souza (São Paulo)

15 March 2023
19:00

Atlético Goianiense	1–1	Volta Redonda
Felipe Vizeu 48'	Report	Berguinho 53'
Penalties
Shaylon (penalty missed); Lucas Gazal (penalty scored); Airton (penalty scored); Emerson Santos (penalty scored); Igor Torres (penalty scored); Matheus Sales (penalty missed)	4–5	(penalty scored) Lelê; (penalty scored) Luciano Naninho; (penalty scored) Berguinho; (penalty missed) Henrique Silva; (penalty scored) Dudu; (penalty scored) Alix Vinicius

Estádio Antônio Accioly, Goiânia
Referee: Rafael Rodrigo Klein (Rio Grande do Sul)

9 March 2023
19:00

Náutico	2–1	Vila Nova
Kayon 13'; Nathan Lourenço 90+8'	Report	Neto Pessoa 90'

Estádio dos Aflitos, Recife
Referee: Paulo César Zanovelli (Minas Gerais)

15 March 2023
21:30

Ypiranga	3–1	Red Bull Bragantino
Erick 16'; João Pedro 55'; Jhonatan 90+5'	Report	Alerrandro 87'

Estádio Olímpico Colosso da Lagoa, Erechim
Referee: Wagner do Nascimento Magalhães (Rio de Janeiro)

16 March 2023
21:30

Vasco da Gama	0–0	ABC
	Report
Penalties
Jair (penalty scored); Miranda (penalty scored); Nenê (penalty scored); Rodríguez (penalty scored); Pedro Raul (penalty missed); Léo (penalty scored); Orellano (penalty missed)	5–6	(penalty scored) Rafael Silva; (penalty scored) Raphael Luz; (penalty missed) Walfrido; (penalty scored) Afonso; (penalty scored) Alemão; (penalty scored) Wálber; (penalty scored) Wellington Reis

Estádio São Januário, Rio de Janeiro
Referee: Paulo César Zanovelli (Minas Gerais)

9 March 2023
21:30

Santos	3–0	Iguatu
Lucas Barbosa 16'; Marcos Leonardo 33', 76'	Report

Estádio Urbano Caldeira, Santos
Referee: Wilton Sampaio (Goiás)

8 March 2023
21:30

Tombense	1–0	Retrô
Alex Sandro 83'	Report

Estádio Soares de Azevedo, Muriaé
Referee: Paulo Roberto Alves Júnior (Paraná)

9 March 2023
20:00

Botafogo	3–1	São Raimundo
Robinho 34'; Diogo Silva 69'; Lucas Oliveira 90+4'	Report	Carlinhos Souza 62'

Estádio Santa Cruz, Ribeirão Preto
Referee: Bruno Mota Correia (Rio de Janeiro)

15 March 2023
15:30

Nova Iguaçu	5–2	Nova Mutum
Breno 2', 16' (pen.); Andrey Dias 38'; Marquinho Macaé 53'; Ícaro 90+3'	Report	Lorran 76' (pen.), 80'

Estádio Jânio Moraes, Nova Iguaçu
Referee: Bruno Pereira Vasconcelos (Bahia)
