= 2024 Campeonato Acreano =

Campeonato Acreano
- Season: 2024
- Champions: Independência
- Relegated: Nauas; Andirá; Atlético Acreano
- Série D: Independência; Humaitá
- Copa do Brasil: Independência; Humaitá
- Copa Verde: Independência; Humaitá
- Matches played: 41
- Goals scored: 109 (2.66 per match)
- Biggest home win: Humaitá 4–0 Náuas (16 March 2024)
- Biggest away win: Andirá 1–5 Vasco-AC (2 April 2024)

The 2024 Campeonato Acreano was the 97th edition of Acre's top professional football league. The competition started on 17 February and ended on 26 April. Independência won the championship for the 12th time.

== Format ==
In the first stage, the teams will be divided into two groups, "A" and "B", group "A" with six teams and group "B" with five teams, which will play each other in their respective groups. Classifying the three best placed teams by earned points in each group for the second stage.

The qualified teams from groups A and B will play each other in the second stage. The club that finishes the given phase first will be the champion.

The champion and the runner-up qualify to the 2025 Campeonato Brasileiro Série D, 2025 Copa do Brasil and the 2025 Copa Verde.

== Participating teams ==
Club	Home City	2023 Result
Associação Desportiva Senador Guiomard (ADESG)	Senador Guiomard	8th
Andirá Esporte Clube	Rio Branco	11th
Atlético Acreano	Rio Branco	5th
Galvez Esporte Clube	Rio Branco	3rd
Sport Clube Humaitá	Porto Acre	2nd
Independência Futebol Clube	Rio Branco	4th
Náuas Esporte Clube	Cruzeiro do Sul	8th
Plácido de Castro Futebol Club	Plácido de Castro	7th
Rio Branco Football Club	Rio Branco	1st
São Francisco Futebol Clube	Rio Branco	6th
Associação Desportiva Vasco da Gama (Vasco de Rio Branco)	Rio Branco	10th

== First stage ==
=== Group A ===
Pos	Team	Pld	W	D	L	GF	GA	GD	Pts	Qualification or relegation
1	Rio Branco (A)	5	3	2	0	9	3	+6	11	Advance to the Second stage
2	Vasco-AC (A)	5	3	0	2	12	6	+6	9	Advance to the Second stage
3	Independência (A)	5	2	3	0	7	4	+3	9	Advance to the Second stage
4	ADESG	5	1	3	1	4	3	+1	6	
5	Atlético Acreano (R)	5	1	1	3	1	9	−8	4	Relegation-Playoff
6	Andirá (R)	5	0	1	4	2	10	−8	1	Relegation

Source: Globo Esporte
(A) Advance to a further round; (R) Relegated

=== Group B ===
Pos	Team	Pld	W	D	L	GF	GA	GD	Pts	Qualification or relegation
1	Humaitá (A)	4	4	0	0	11	1	+10	12	Advance to the Second stage
2	São Francisco (A)	4	2	1	1	5	3	+2	7	Advance to the Second stage
3	Galvez (A)	4	1	2	1	4	7	−3	5	Advance to the Second stage
4	Plácido de Castro	4	1	0	3	3	5	−2	3	
5	Náuas	4	0	1	3	2	9	−7	1	

Source: Globo Esporte
(A) Advance to a further round

== Second stage ==
Pos	Team	Pld	W	D	L	GF	GA	GD	Pts
1	Independência (C)	5	3	1	1	9	4	+5	10
2	Humaitá	5	2	3	0	9	5	+4	9
3	Rio Branco	5	2	1	2	5	7	−2	7
4	Vasco de Rio Branco	4	1	2	1	8	7	+1	5
5	Galvez	4	1	2	1	5	5	0	5
6	São Francisco	5	0	1	4	4	12	−8	1

Source: Globo Esporte
(C) Champions
