= Pedro Henrique (footballer, born 1997) =

Brazilian footballer

Personal information
- Full name: Pedro Henrique Oliveira da Silva
- Date of birth: 2 February 1997 (age 29)
- Place of birth: Brazil
- Height: 1.82 m (6 ft 0 in)
- Positions: Striker; right winger

Youth career
- Mirassol
- –2015: Madureira

Senior career*
Years	Team	Apps	(Gls)
2016	Rondonópolis		
2017	Alto Acre	1	(0)
2019	The Strongest	0	(0)
2020–2022	Vaca Díez		
2023	Humaitá	0	(0)
2023	Galvez	8	(11)
2023	São Francisco	4	(0)
2024	ADESG	1	(0)
2024–2026	The Cong–Viettel	56	(25)
- * Club domestic league appearances and goals as of 7 June 2026

Pedro Henrique Oliveira da Silva (born 2 February 1997), commonly known as Pedro Henrique, is a Brazilian professional footballer who plays as a striker or right winger for.

== Club career ==
Henrique started his youth career playing for Mirassol and Madureira. In 2019, he signed for Bolivian team The Strongest but only played with their reserves before being released. He then signed for Vaca Díez in Bolivia's low tier, and remained there during three seasons. After that, he moved to Brazilian Série D side Humaitá but left after two weeks to join Galvez in order to gain more playing time. There, he netted 11 goals in the 2023 Campeonato Acreano, thus finish as the competition's top scorer.

In May 2023, Henrique joined Série D club São Francisco but was released by the club after appearing in only four games.

In March 2024, Henrique signed for joined Vietnamese side The Cong-Viettel. In his debut with the club, he scored the only goal of the game to help his team defeat their rivals Hanoi Police, thus advance to the 2023–24 Vietnamese Cup quarter-finals.

== Career statistics ==
As of match played 7 June 2026

Appearances and goals by club, season and competition
Club	Season	League			State league		National cup		Other		Total	
Club	Season	Division	Apps	Goals	Apps	Goals	Apps	Goals	Apps	Goals	Apps	Goals
Galvez	2023	Campeonato Acreano	—		8	11	—		—		8	11
São Francisco	2023	Série D	4	0	—		0	0	—		4	0
ADESG	2024	Campeonato Acreano	—		1	0	—		—		1	0
The Cong-Viettel	2023–24	V.League 1	11	7	—		2	1	—		13	8
The Cong-Viettel	2024–25	V.League 1	26	13	—		2	0	—		28	13
The Cong-Viettel	2025–26	V.League 1	19	5	—		1	1	—		20	6
The Cong-Viettel	Total		56	25	—		5	2	—		61	27
Career total			60	25	9	11	5	2	0	0	74	38

== Honours ==
Vaca Díez

- Copa Simón Bolívar: 2022

Individual

- Campeonato Acreano top scorer: 2023
