= Campeonato Acreano de Futebol Feminino =

Women's football league in Acre, Brazil

- Founded: 2007
- Country: Brazil
- Confederation: FFAC
- Promotion to: Brasileiro Série A3
- Current champions: Galvez (2nd title) (2025)
- Most championships: Assermurb (6 titles)
- Current: 2026

The Campeonato Acreano de Futebol Feminino is the women's football state championship of Acre state, and is contested since 2007.

== List of champions ==
Following is the list with all recognized titles of Campeonato Acreano Feminino:

Season	Champions	Runners-up
2007	Andirá (1)	
2008	Assermurb (1)	
2009	Assermurb (2)	
2010	Assermurb (3)	
2011	AD Amazônia (1)	
2012	AD Amazônia (2)	Atlético Acreano
2013	Assermurb (4)	
2014	Not held	
2015	Atlético Acreano (1)	Galvez
2016	Assermurb (5)	Atlético Acreano
2017	Atlético Acreano (2)	São Francisco/Assermurb
2018	Atlético Acreano (3)	Assermurb
2019	Atlético Acreano (4)	Assermurb
2020	Cancelled due to COVID-19 pandemic in Brazil	
2021	Rio Branco (1)	Assermurb
2022	Assermurb (6)	Galvez
2023	Atlético Acreano (5)	Assermurb
2024	Galvez (1)	Assermurb
2025	Galvez (2)	ADESG

== Titles by team ==
Teams in bold stills active.

Rank	Club	Winners	Winning years
1	**Assermurb**	6	2008, 2009, 2010, 2013, 2016, 2022
2	**Atlético Acreano**	5	2015, 2017, 2018, 2019, 2023
3	AD Amazônia	2	2011, 2012
3	**Galvez**	2	2024, 2025
5	**Andirá**	1	2007
5	**Rio Branco**	1	2021
