= Andirá Esporte Clube =

Andirá
- Full name: Andirá Esporte Clube
- Nickname: Morcego (Bat)
- Founded: 1 November 1964; 60 years ago
- Ground: Arena Acreana; Florestão
- Capacity: 20,000 (Arena Acreana); 10,000 (Florestão)
- President: Afonso Alves
- Head Coach: Renato Rosa
- League: Campeonato Acreano Segunda Divisão
- 2024: Acreano, 11th of 11 (relegated)
Home colours	Away colours

Andirá Esporte Clube, commonly known as Andirá, is a Brazilian football club based in Rio Branco, Acre. The club currently competes in Campenato Acreano, the top division of the Acre state football league. Andirá played three times in the Brazilian Série C, with their best result being a 37th place finish in the 2001 season.

The club has spent most of its existence fighting against relegation in the Acre state championship, despite being runners-up in the 2007 season. Andirá won the Acreano Segunda Divisão twice.

Andirá Esporte Clube's home kit is a shirt with vertical black and green stripes, black shorts and black socks. The team mascot is a bat.

== History ==
Andirá Esporte Clube was founded on 1 November 1964, by the Dantas family, one of the most traditional clans in Acre. The club takes its name from the word "andyrá", which is Tupi for "bat".

Andirá's colors were initially black and white, but in 2006, the club adopted green in its uniform, which, according to then club president Gilberto Braga, is a tribute to the Amazon and rubber, which is prominently produced in Acre.

Andirá competed in the Acre state league for the first time in the 1964 season, taking part in all Campeonato Acreano seasons in the amateur era, but failing to win the title.

=== Professional era ===
On 28 May 1989, Andirá took part in the first ever professional Campeonato Acreano match, losing 1–5 to Rio Branco at Estádio José de Melo. The Morcego didn't fare well in the 1989 season, finishing dead last after losing nine of ten games and scoring just one point overall, following a goalless draw with Atlético.

The following years, the Morcego were a mainstay in the bottom of the Campeonato Acreano table, more often than not failing to win a single game. After defeating Grêmio 2–0 on 23 July 1995, Andirá had a winless streak that lasted more than two years, ending with a 4–3 victory over Atlético on 1 August 1997.

In 1995, Andirá played for the first time in a national competition, taking part in the 1995 Série C. The club finished last among 107 clubs, losing all four games they played.

In the 90's, Andirá were in the losing side of several blowout games, including a 1–11 loss to Independência in 1993, a 0–8 defeat to Juventus on 11 June 1995, a 0–7 defeat once again to Independência, on 17 June 1997, and another 0–8 loss, this time to ADESG, on 5 June 1999.

Andirá had a better showing in the 2000 season, finishing second in the second stage of the Campeonato Acreano, but nevertheless failing to advance to the finals. They played for the second time in the Série C in 2001, finishing sixth out of seven in their group and 37th overall. The next year, Andirá had another shot at the Série C, but failed to win a single game and finished 55th overall.

After a 4th place finish in the 2001 state league, the Morcego finished last in 2002 and 2003, improving their record to a 5th place finish in 2004.

The club decided not to play in the 2005 Campeonato Acreano, returning in 2006. The club made it to the first stage semifinals, losing 2–3 to ADESG. Andirá finished fourth overall in the 2006 Campeonato Acreano. The next season, Andirá had their best showing in the state league, finishing second overall, conceding only seven goals in 12 games. The club however decided not to play in the 2008 season, returning in 2009 to a sixth place finish.

Andirá once again failed to win a single match during the 2010 season, which saw the team getting relegated for the first time in club history. The Morcego quickly found their way back to the top tier of the state league, claiming the second division title in 2011. Led by league top goalscorer Eduardo, the club finished 6th in the 2012 Campeonato Acreano. Andirá escaped relegation in 2013, finishing second-last, but a last place finish in 2014 meant the club would have to play in the Segunda Divisão for the second time.

Andirá won their second Segunda Divisão title on 29 September 2015, beating ADESG 4–2 aggregate in the finals. After three consecutive second-last finishes between 2016 and 2018, Andirá had a better showing in the following years, finishing 7th in 2019 and 2020.

== Honours ==
=== State ===
- Campeonato Acreano
  - Runners-up (1): 2007
- Campeonato Acreano Segunda Divisão
  - Winners (2): 2011, 2015

=== Women's Football ===
- Campeonato Acreano de Futebol Feminino
  - Winners (1): 2007
