= 2023 Copa do Brasil third round =

2022 Copa do Brasil football competition

The 2023 Copa do Brasil third round was the third round of the 2023 Copa do Brasil football competition. It was played from 11 to 27 April 2023. A total of 32 teams competed in the third round to decide 16 places in the final rounds of the 2023 Copa do Brasil.

== Draw ==
The draw for the third round was held on 29 March 2023, 14:00 at CBF headquarters in Rio de Janeiro. In a first draw, the 32 teams, seeded by their CBF ranking, were drawn into 16 ties. The home and away teams of each leg were decided in a second draw. CBF ranking is shown in parentheses.

Pot A	Pot B
Flamengo (1); Palmeiras (2); Athletico Paranaense (3); Atlético Mineiro (4); São Paulo (5); Fluminense (6); Fortaleza (7); Corinthians (8); Santos (9); Internacional (10); Grêmio (11); América Mineiro (12); Bahia (15); Botafogo (16); Cruzeiro (18); Coritiba (23)	Sport (26); CRB (27); CSA (28); Náutico (37); Remo (38); Tombense (39); Brasil de Pelotas (40); Paysandu (43); ABC (44); Ituano (46); Botafogo (48); Volta Redonda (52); Ypiranga (53); Nova Iguaçu (127); Maringá (185); Águia de Marabá (no rank)

== Format ==
In the third round, each tie was played on a home-and-away two-legged basis. If the aggregate score was level, the second-leg match would go straight to the penalty shoot-out to determine the winners.

== Matches ==
Times are BRT (UTC−3), as listed by CBF (local times, if different, are in parentheses).

Team 1	Agg.	Team 2	1st leg	2nd leg
Botafogo	0–3	Santos	0–2	0–1
Nova Iguaçu	1–7	América Mineiro	1–2	0–5
Coritiba	3–5	Sport	3–3	0–2
Náutico	1–2	Cruzeiro	1–0	0–2
Atlético Mineiro	3–2	Brasil de Pelotas	2–1	1–1
Volta Redonda	1–6	Bahia	1–2	0–4
Ypiranga	0–4	Botafogo	0–2	0–2
ABC	1–3	Grêmio	0–2	1–1
Maringá	4–8	Flamengo	2–0	2–8
São Paulo	1–0	Ituano	0–0	1–0
Fluminense	6–0	Paysandu	3–0	3–0
Remo	2–2 (4–5 p)	Corinthians	2–0	0–2
Internacional	3–3 (7–6 p)	CSA	2–1	1–2
Fortaleza	8–1	Águia de Marabá	6–1	2–0
CRB	2–2 (2–4 p)	Athletico Paranaense	1–0	1–2
Palmeiras	5–3	Tombense	4–2	1–1

11 April 2023
19:00

Botafogo	0–2	Santos
	Report	Lucas Lima 14'; Marcos Leonardo 37' (pen.)

Estádio Santa Cruz, Ribeirão Preto
Referee: Bráulio da Silva Machado (Santa Catarina)
26 April 2023
19:00

Santos	1–0	Botafogo
Messias 50'	Report

Estádio Urbano Caldeira, Santos
Referee: Rodrigo José Pereira de Lima (Pernambuco)

Santos won 3–0 on aggregate.

12 April 2023
16:30

Nova Iguaçu	1–2	América Mineiro
Andrey Dias 78'	Report	Adyson 46'; Fernandinho 90+3' (o.g.)

Estádio Raulino de Oliveira, Volta Redonda
Referee: Diego Pombo Lopez (Bahia)
26 April 2023
21:30

América Mineiro	5–0	Nova Iguaçu
Mikael 48'; Everaldo 68'; Aloísio 75', 85'; Felipe Azevedo 78'	Report

Arena Independência, Belo Horizonte
Referee: Caio Max Augusto Vieira (Rio Grande do Norte)

América Mineiro won 7–1 on aggregate.

12 April 2023
19:00

Coritiba	3–3	Sport
Alef Manga 15', 25', 75' (pen.)	Report	Vágner Love 8', 59'; Luciano Juba 50'

Estádio Couto Pereira, Curitiba
Referee: Leandro Pedro Vuaden (Rio Grande do Sul)
26 April 2023
19:00

Sport	2–0	Coritiba
Ewerthon 3'; Wanderson 70'	Report

Estádio Ilha do Retiro, Recife
Referee: Bráulio da Silva Machado (Santa Catarina)

Sport won 5–3 on aggregate.

13 April 2023
19:00

Náutico	1–0	Cruzeiro
Gabriel Santiago 87'	Report

Estádio dos Aflitos, Recife
Referee: Marcelo de Lima Henrique (Ceará)
25 April 2023
19:00

Cruzeiro	2–0	Náutico
William 54'; Richard 89'	Report

Arena Independência, Belo Horizonte
Referee: Luiz Flávio de Oliveira (São Paulo)

Cruzeiro won 2–1 on aggregate.

12 April 2023
21:30

Atlético Mineiro	2–1	Brasil de Pelotas
Battaglia 65'; Hulk 85' (pen.)	Report	João Marcus 55'

Mineirão, Belo Horizonte
Referee: Edina Alves Batista (São Paulo)
26 April 2023
19:30

Brasil de Pelotas	1–1	Atlético Mineiro
Márcio Jonatan 17'	Report	Zaracho 88'

Estádio Bento Freitas, Pelotas
Referee: Bruno Arleu de Araújo (Rio de Janeiro)

Atlético Mineiro won 3–2 on aggregate.

11 April 2023
16:30

Volta Redonda	1–2	Bahia
Gabriel Bahia 58'	Report	Biel 38'; Gabriel Xavier 61'

Estádio Raulino de Oliveira, Volta Redonda
Referee: Luiz Flávio de Oliveira (São Paulo)
27 April 2023
19:00

Bahia	4–0	Volta Redonda
Cauly 56'; Arthur Sales 67', 90+4'; Vítor Jacaré 75' (pen.)	Report

Arena Fonte Nova, Salvador
Referee: Sávio Pereira Sampaio (Distrito Federal)

Bahia won 6–1 on aggregate.

12 April 2023
21:30

Ypiranga	0–2	Botafogo
	Report	Carlos Eduardo 3', 80'

Estádio Olímpico Colosso da Lagoa, Erechim
Referee: Paulo César Zanovelli (Minas Gerais)
27 April 2023
19:30

Botafogo	2–0	Ypiranga
Matheus Nascimento 4'; Janderson 87'	Report

Estádio Olímpico Nilton Santos, Rio de Janeiro
Referee: Dênis da Silva Ribeiro Serafim (Alagoas)

Botafogo won 4–0 on aggregate.

13 April 2023
21:30

ABC	0–2	Grêmio
	Report	Villasanti 75'; Bitello 80'

Frasqueirão, Natal
Referee: Raphael Claus (São Paulo)
27 April 2023
21:30

Grêmio	1–1	ABC
Everton Galdino 90+2'	Report	Matheus Anjos 20'

Arena do Grêmio, Porto Alegre
Referee: Dyorgines José Padovani de Andrade (Espírito Santo)

Grêmio won 3–1 on aggregate.

13 April 2023
20:00

Maringá	2–0	Flamengo
David Luiz 37' (o.g.); Serginho 57'	Report

Estádio Willie Davids, Maringá
Referee: Flávio Rodrigues de Souza (São Paulo)
26 April 2023
21:30

Flamengo	8–2	Maringá
Thiago Maia 2'; Pedro 18', 66', 84', 87'; Gabriel Barbosa 29' (pen.); Gerson 45+3'; Everton 57'	Report	Fabrício Bruno 38' (o.g.); Serginho 64'

Maracanã, Rio de Janeiro
Referee: Raphael Claus (São Paulo)

Flamengo won 8–4 on aggregate.

11 April 2023
21:30

São Paulo	0–0	Ituano
	Report

Estádio do Morumbi, São Paulo
Referee: Caio Max Augusto Vieira (Rio Grande do Norte)
25 April 2023
21:30

Ituano	0–1	São Paulo
	Report	Wellington Rato 62'

Estádio Novelli Júnior, Itu
Referee: Anderson Daronco (Rio Grande do Sul)

São Paulo won 1–0 on aggregate.

12 April 2023
19:30

Fluminense	3–0	Paysandu
Nino 27'; Keno 34'; Felipe Melo 41'	Report

Maracanã, Rio de Janeiro
Referee: Anderson Daronco (Rio Grande do Sul)
25 April 2023
20:00

Paysandu	0–3	Fluminense
	Report	Cano 2'; Keno 43'; John Kennedy 71'

Mangueirão, Belém
Referee: Edina Alves Batista (São Paulo)

Fluminense won 6–0 on aggregate.

12 April 2023
21:30

Remo	2–0	Corinthians
Franco 12'; Muriqui 60'	Report

Mangueirão, Belém
Referee: Ramon Abatti Abel (Santa Catarina)
26 April 2023
21:30

Corinthians	2–0	Remo
Adson 1'; Róger Guedes 90+2'	Report
Penalties
Yuri Alberto (penalty scored); Maycon (penalty scored); Vera (penalty scored); Matheus Bidu (penalty scored); Róger Guedes (penalty scored)	5–4	(penalty scored) Ícaro; (penalty missed) Leonan; (penalty scored) Anderson Uchôa; (penalty scored) Muriqui; (penalty scored) Claudinei

Neo Química Arena, São Paulo
Referee: Paulo César Zanovelli (Minas Gerais)

2–2 on aggregate; Corinthians won on penalties.

11 April 2023
20:00

Internacional	2–1	CSA
Alan Patrick 23', 49'	Report	Gabriel Taliari 9'

Estádio Beira-Rio, Porto Alegre
Referee: Yuri Elino Ferreira da Cruz (Rio de Janeiro)
27 April 2023
20:00

CSA	2–1	Internacional
Tomas Bastos 40'; Thiaguinho 81'	Report	Alan Patrick 63' (pen.)
Penalties
Rodolfo (penalty scored); Yago Henrique (penalty missed); Thiaguinho (penalty scored); Rhuan (penalty scored); Gabriel Taliari (penalty scored); Luís Felipe (penalty scored); Almir Luan (penalty scored); Bruno Matias (penalty missed)	6–7	(penalty scored) Luiz Adriano; (penalty missed) Maurício; (penalty scored) Renê; (penalty scored) Jean Dias; (penalty scored) De Pena; (penalty scored) Wanderson; (penalty scored) Matheus Dias; (penalty scored) Vitão

Estádio Rei Pelé, Maceió
Referee: Flávio Rodrigues de Souza (São Paulo)

3–3 on aggregate; Internacional won on penalties.

11 April 2023
21:30

Fortaleza	6–1	Águia de Marabá
Dudu 7'; Ceballos 23'; Guilherme 45+2'; Thiago Galhardo 78', 90+7'; Yago Pikachu 90+3'	Report	David Cruz 47'

Castelão, Fortaleza
Referee: João Vitor Gobi (São Paulo)
26 April 2023
19:30

Águia de Marabá	0–2	Fortaleza
	Report	Romarinho 8'; Vinícius Zanocelo 28'

Mangueirão, Belém
Referee: Alisson Sidnei Furtado (Tocantins)

Fortaleza won 8–1 on aggregate.

12 April 2023
19:30

CRB	1–0	Athletico Paranaense
Anderson Leite 55'	Report

Estádio Rei Pelé, Maceió
Referee: Wilton Sampaio (Goiás)
25 April 2023
21:30

Athletico Paranaense	2–1	CRB
Alex Santana 63', 81'	Report	Anselmo Ramon 7'
Penalties
Fernandinho (penalty scored); Terans (penalty scored); Pablo (penalty scored); Vitor Bueno (penalty scored)	4–2	(penalty missed) Diogo Silva; (penalty missed) Anselmo Ramon; (penalty scored) João Paulo; (penalty scored) Matheus Ribeiro

Arena da Baixada, Curitiba
Referee: Leandro Pedro Vuaden (Rio Grande do Sul)

2–2 on aggregate; Athletico Paranaense won on penalties.

12 April 2023
20:00

Palmeiras	4–2	Tombense
Gabriel Menino 36'; López 40'; Gómez 87' (pen.); Rafael Navarro 90+6'	Report	Matheus Frizzo 9'; Marcelinho 90+2'

Allianz Parque, São Paulo
Referee: Bruno Arleu de Araújo (Rio de Janeiro)
26 April 2023
20:00

Tombense	1–1	Palmeiras
Alex Sandro 85'	Report	Breno Lopes 12'

Estádio Parque do Sabiá, Uberlândia
Referee: Ramon Abatti Abel (Santa Catarina)

Palmeiras won 5–3 on aggregate.
