= Axel Lopes =

Brazilian footballer

Personal information
- Full name: Axel Bernardes Lopes
- Date of birth: 3 August 1992 (age 34)
- Place of birth: São Leopoldo, Brazil
- Height: 1.90 m (6 ft 3 in)
- Position: Goalkeeper

Team information
- Current team: Amazonas

Youth career
- Aimoré

Senior career*
Years	Team	Apps	(Gls)
2011–2012	Aimoré		
2012	→ Brasil de Farroupilha (loan)		
2013	Guarani-VA		
2013–2014	São Gabriel		
2015	Guarani-VA		
2016–2018	Santos-AP	23	(0)
2016	→ Tupi–RS (loan)		
2018	Tuna Luso		
2019–2020	Bragantino-PA	24	(0)
2021–2022	Castanhal	29	(0)
2022	→ Parauapebas (loan)		
2023–2025	Águia de Marabá	93	(0)
2025	Criciúma	3	(0)
2026–	Amazonas	1	(0)
- * Club domestic league appearances and goals as of 10 November 2026

Axel Bernardes Lopes (born 3 August 1992), simply known as Axel Lopes, is a Brazilian professional footballer who plays as a goalkeeper for Amazonas.

== Career ==
Born in São Leopoldo, Axel Lopes was revealed by Aimoré. He played the first part of his career for teams in the countryside of Rio Grande do Sul, until in 2016 he was hired by Santos do Amapá, where he won the state championship twice. From then on, he played in football in the north of the country, his most notable work being winning the Pará title in 2023 with Águia de Marabá, the first in the club's history.

On 24 May 2024, he played a memorable match against São Paulo FC, in the 2024 Copa do Brasil, which earned him prominence throughout the country's sports media. Axel Lopes also asked for collaboration for the 2024 Rio Grande do Sul floods, which directly affected his family members. In July 2025, Lopes signed a contract with Criciúma.

== Honours ==
Santos-AP

- Campeonato Amapaense: 2016, 2017

Águia de Marabá

- Campeonato Paraense: 2023
- Super Copa Grão-Pará: 2024
