= São Francisco Futebol Clube =

São Francisco Futebol Clube is the name of four different association football clubs in Brazil:

- São Francisco Futebol Clube (RR) - located in Boa Vista, Roraima, Brazil
- São Francisco Futebol Clube (AC) - located in Rio Branco, Acre, Brazil
- São Francisco Futebol Clube (PA) - located in Santarém, Pará, Brazil
- São Francisco Futebol Clube (BA) - located in São Francisco do Conde, Brazil
