= Águia de Marabá Futebol Clube =

Association football club in Marabá, Brazil

Águia de Marabá
- Full name: Águia de Marabá Futebol Clube
- Nickname: Azulão (Big Blue)
- Founded: 22 January 1982; 44 years ago
- Ground: Estádio Municipal Zinho de Oliveira
- Capacity: 5,000
- President: Sebastião Ferreira Neto
- Head coach: Júlio César Nunes
- League: Campeonato Brasileiro Série D Campeonato Paraense
- 2025 2025: Série D, 33rd of 64; Paraense, 4th of 12
- Website: aguiademaraba.com.br
Home colors	Away colors

Águia de Marabá Futebol Clube, commonly referred to as Águia de Marabá, is a Brazilian multi-sport association, founded on 22 January 1982, whose main modality is football, based in the city of Marabá, in the state of Pará. Its colors are red, blue and white, being one of the most traditional teams in the interior of Pará. It competes in the Campeonato Brasileiro Série D, the fourth tier of Brazilian football, as well as in the Campeonato Paraense, the top flight of the Pará state football league.

Given its professionalization time, it is one of the most successful football teams in Pará (excluding the RE-PA-TU trio) if considered the Campeonato Brasileiro Série C and Série D, where it added 11 participations, being the sixth highest scorer in the Campeonato Brasileiro Série C between 2009 and 2015. Among its greatest glories are two regional championships, in 2000 and 2002, currently known as editions of the "Copa Meio-Norte" (Mid-North Cup). In 2023, the club was state champion for the first time, having also been runner-up in the Campeonato Paraense in 2008 and 2010.

The number of sympathizers of the team generally puts them between the third and fourth largest crowd in Pará, being the largest in the interior of the state. In football, the club plays at the Estádio Municipal Zinho de Oliveira, nicknamed the "Ninho das Aves" (Birds’ Nest).

Men's football is Águia de Marabá's most traditional modality, although there are teams for women's football, futsal (both sexes), basketball (both sexes) and volleyball (both sexes).

== History ==
Águia de Marabá Futebol Clube was founded on January 22, 1982, under the name of Águia Esporte Clube and had as its first president the sportsman Emivaldo Milhomem, who had the support of Valtemir "Bezourão" Pereira Lima to found the association. The team had been created to compete in the Campeonato Marabaense Second Division of that year. The team was composed of amateur players, the most notable being: Déca, Gamito and Keneddi.

The team won the Campeonato Marabaense Second Division title in 1984, which gave the team the right to compete in the Campeonato Marabaense First Division the following year.

=== Early years and professionalization ===
At this stage of its history, Águia had José "Zé" Atlas Pinheiro as president. During this period, the team won three municipal championships — in 1989, 1992 and 1993 —, as well as four runners-up championships — in 1988, 1994, 1996 and 1998. At the last vice-championship, Águia's president was already Jorge Nery, who, sought by councilor Sebastião "Ferreirinha" Ferreira Neto in 1999, agreed to professionalize the team. The proposal gained support from the then president of the Federação Paraense de Futebol (FPF; Pará Football Federation), Coronel Nunes [pt], from the Companhia Vale do Rio Doce (Doce River Valley Company; today Vale) and from the local business community.

In the 1999 Campeonato Paraense [pt], Águia’s debut competition as a professional team, the team finished among the top six clubs, with a strong squad, of which stood out: Marcos Garça, Damião, Berg, Paulinho Santarém, Gilberto Pereira, Maurinho and Corujito; the latter scored three goals in the competition and became the team's top scorer in the championship.

In 2000, the following year as a professional, Águia won the title of the Copa Ferreirinha (the first edition of the "Copa Meio-Norte" [Mid-North Cup]), a tournament created to honor the idealizer of the team's professionalization, played by teams from Pará and the states of Maranhão and Tocantins, in addition to the host team, which in the following year was in second place in the tournament, having lost the final to Clube do Remo.

In the 2000 Campeonato Paraense [pt], the team placed fifth in the championship and became runner-up of the interior, and in the 2001 edition [pt], although it ended up again in sixth place, it was finally crowned champion of the interior, a symbolic title given to the best classified interior team in the Campeonato Paraense. Precisely due to this good performance in the 2001 state championship, the team from Marabá was guaranteed the right to compete in the 2001 Campeonato Brasileiro Série C (the third division of Brazilian football), where they had discrete performances, however, above the expectations of the board and Águia fans.

=== Decade of consolidation: 2002–2012 ===
In 2002, the team did not have a good participation in the state championship [pt] as well as in the Série C, and ended the season being coached by football director João Maria Galvão Gonçalves. However, under the command of Galvão, the team won the Maranhão-Pará-Tocantins Cup (the third edition of the "Copa Meio-Norte" [Mid-North Cup]) title.

In the 2003 Campeonato Paraense [pt], still coached by Galvão, the team achieved its best campaign in the history of the championship, achieving fourth place. From the 2004 [pt] to the 2007 Campenato Paraense [nl], the team had average performances, but remained competing in the main division.

In 2008, Águia won the "Taça Cidade de Belém" [pt] (City of Belém Cup), equivalent to the first round of the state championship [pt], finishing runner-up in the championship after a dispute with Remo. By being the runner-up in the state championship, the team gained access to the 2008 Campeonato Brasileiro Série C. From this season onwards, Águia had a period of greater regularity, adding eight consecutive appearances in the Série C. In 2008, in fact, the team came very close to being promoted to the 2009 Campeonato Brasileiro Série B, placing fifth overall (only four teams were promoted).

The runner-up championship in the 2008 Campeonato Paraense earned the team a place in the 2009 Copa do Brasil (Brazil Cup). In this competition the team qualified for the second stage by eliminating América Mineiro, winning the first match 2–1 at home and 1–0 in Belo Horizonte. In the second stage, Águia won the first game, in Belém, by 2–1 over a powerful Fluminense. In the away game, Fluminense won 3–0, eliminating Águia.

In 2010, the team won the Taça Estado do Pará [pt] (State of Pará Cup), the title of the second round of the state championship [nl]. However, when competing in the final against Paysandu, Águia lost the dispute for the Taça Açaí, the 2010 Campeonato Paraense title. The team almost repeated its good campaigns in the 2009 [pt] and the 2012 Campeonato Paraense [pt], by finishing, respectively, in fourth and third place overall. The following participations in the Copa do Brasil and Série C were more timid, with the exception of the campaign on the latter competition in 2010, when Águia reached the quarter-finals.

=== Decline, relegation and setbacks: 2013–2016 ===
In the 2013 Campeonato Paraense, the team's poor performance resulted in them being demoted to the first stage of the first state division the following year. For the 2014 Campeonato Paraense, Águia was competing in the "Taça ACLEP" (ACLEP Cup; the first stage of the championship). However, in yet another inglorious performance, they were unable to reach the second stage, finishing the stage in third place (only the two best teams were qualified). Águia came very close to being relegated in the 2014 Campeonato Brasileiro Série C, only escaping relegation in the last round.

In 2015, in its worst campaign in the state championship since then, Águia finished in ninth place out of ten teams in the first stage, being relegated to the 2016 Campeonato Paraense Segunda Divisão. In the 2015 Campeonato Brasileiro Série C, after losing to Fortaleza 4–1, Águia was relegated to the 2016 Campeonato Brasileiro Série D. However, in the same year of its double relegation, Águia managed, in an undefeated campaign (shortly after being relegated to the Campeonato Brasileiro Série D), the title of champion of the Campeonato Paraense Segunda Divisão, beating São Raimundo 1–0 at Zinho de Oliveira. This characteristic of the Campeonato Paraense, where the lower division is played in the same year as the higher division, made Águia, being relegated in 2015, play in the first division in 2016.

Starting the year with the 2016 Campeonato Paraense, after a good first stage, Águia finished the second stage by almost being relegated again. Then, still in 2016, competing in the Série D for the first time after being relegated from the Série C, Águia was eliminated in the second stage of the competition, finishing in 24th place overall. Having a good participation in the 2016 Copa Verde de Futebol (Green Cup) — a competition Águia entered based on the ranking of the Brazilian Football Confederation (CBF) —, the team had another setback when it was excluded from the competition by the Superior Tribunal de Justiça Desportiva [pt] (STJD; Superior Court of Sports Justice) due to the irregular line-up of full-back Léo Rosa.

=== Restructuring in the Campeonato Paraense and a return to the national scene: 2017–2023 ===
Between 2017 and 2021, Águia did not gain access to national competitions and only competed in the Campeonato Paraense. It was a period of average performances, only to guarantee the team in the first division of the state. Its best position in the Campeonato Paraense, between 2017 and 2021, was a 5th place in the 2017 edition.

The team entered, again due to the CBF ranking criteria, in the 2017 Copa Verde de Futebol, achieving a surprising participation in the quarter-finals, placing 8th overall. Even with such fluctuating results from 2015 to 2017, the subsequent period, 2017 to 2021, was one of severe financial crisis for the team.

In 2022, Águia had a significant change in its technical command, with the departure of João Galvão. Despite this, the team from Marabá won 4th place in the 2022 Campeonato Paraense (its best campaign since the 2012 edition) and thus guaranteed its presence in the 2023 Campeonato Brasileiro Série D and the 2023 Copa do Brasil.

In the Copa do Brasil, Águia achieved its best performance to date by reaching the third round. At the Estádio Zinho de Oliveira (in the first round), Águia defeated Botafogo 2–1. In the following round at the same venue, Águia eliminated Goiás, then a first-tier side, winning a penalty shoot-out after a 0–0 draw. The club's campaign ended in the third round after two defeats against Fortaleza, another Série A team.

In the 2023 Campeonato Paraense, the team played 14 matches, getting 8 wins, 3 draws and 3 losses, scoring 21 goals and conceding 12 goals, qualifying for the third time in its history for a state championship final. In the final, Águia entered the field against Clube do Remo already with the advantage of having won the first match, by 1–0, at the Zinho de Oliveira stadium, in Marabá. In the second game, at Baenão in Belém, Remo won in normal time by 2–1, forcing a penalty shoot-out. On penalties, Águia beat Remo, by 5–4, managing to become state champion for the first time, and in the opponent's home.

During the 2023 Campeonato Brasileiro Série D, the team lost its state champion coach Mathaus Sodré due to disagreements with the club's board, with Rafael Jacques taking his place. After finishing the group stage of the competition in third place, the team advanced to the round of 16 and was eliminated by Atlético Cearense. Before its elimination, Águia had broken the record for average attendance in home games among teams from the northern region participating in the competition, selling out the Zinho de Oliveira stadium in all matches. Águia finished in 24th place overall, occupying the same position as in the 2016 Campeonato Brasileiro Série D (until then, the last time the team had participated in the competition).

== Crowd ==
In 1999 it was organized at the Casa do Estudante Marabaense (CEMAB; House of the Student from Marabá) in Belém, under the auspices of students and athletes Denner and Donner, and two friends, Sidney Jr. and Jorge, the Torcida dos Filhos e Amigos de Marabá (Crowd of Children and Friends of Marabá), which in the following year joined the Torcida do Águia de Marabá (Crowd of Águia de Marabá), to carry out a fusion that resulted in the Torcida Organizada do Águia de Marabá (TOAM; Organized Crowd of Águia de Marabá), which from that year on, started to accompany the team during official and friendly disputes; TOAM is the largest of Águia's organizations.

In addition to TOAM, four other organizations stand out: Revolução Azul (Blue Revolution); Fiel da Folha 28 (Faithful from the Folha 28). Jovem Águia (Young Eagle), and; Garra Azul Fiel (Faithful Blue Claw).

== Stadium ==
Águia de Marabá play their home games at the Estádio Municipal Zinho de Oliveira. The stadium has a maximum capacity of 5,000 people.

== Rivalries ==
Regional sports journalism recognizes the former association Castanheira Esporte Clube as the main rival of Águia, a traditional team from Marabá of which Águia played with in three municipal championship finals, in 1993, 1996 and 1998. Gavião Kyikatejê, who inherited and owns the rights of Castanheira, has been cited as a rival of Águia de Marabá at least since 2009, when Gavião became a professional club, with the games between the teams being called Clássico Marabaense or Clássico das Aves (Classic of Marabá or Classic of Birds, respectively).

At the intra-regional level (south and southeast of Pará), clashes of a certain tradition occur with Independente de Tucuruí (with whom Águia plays the Clássico de Carajás [Carajás Classic]) and Parauapebas (with whom Águia plays the Clássico do Sudeste [Southeast Classic]), both pointed out as rivals of Águia at least since 2011. At the extra-regional level (south and north of Pará), Águia has a history of decisions against Remo and Paysandu, although both teams from Belém do not consider Águia de Marabá a notorious opponent.

== Current squad ==
2024 season team

Note: Flags indicate national team as defined under FIFA eligibility rules; some limited exceptions apply. Players may hold more than one non-FIFA nationality.

No.	Pos.	Nation	Player
1	GK	BRA	Axel Lopes
2	DF	BRA	Bruno Limão
3	DF	BRA	David Cruz
4	DF	BRA	Caíque Baiano
5	MF	BRA	Júnior Dindê
6	DF	BRA	João Pabllo
7	MF	BRA	Hitalo
8	MF	BRA	Patrick
9	FW	BRA	Rodrigão
10	MF	BRA	Erick Flores
13	DF	BRA	Betão
14	DF	BRA	Diego Augusto
15	MF	BRA	Soares
15	MF	BRA	Fabiano Santiago
16	DF	BRA	Daelson
16	MF	BRA	Felipe Guedes
17	DF	BRA	Dieguinho

No.	Pos.	Nation	Player
17	DF	BRA	Matheus Lima
18	MF	BRA	Pablo
19	MF	BRA	Kaique
21	MF	BRA	Germano
21	FW	BRA	João Guilherme
23	FW	BRA	Wander Silva
24	MF	BRA	Samuel
—	GK	BRA	Arthur Mezzomo
—	GK	BRA	Tarracanã
—	GK	BRA	Matheus Melo
—	DF	BRA	Kauan Cardoso
—	DF	BRA	Lucca Lanes
—	DF	BRA	Santa Cruz
—	MF	BRA	Diego
—	MF	BRA	Krowa
—	MF	BRA	Yago Melo

== Honours ==
=== Official tournaments ===
State
Competitions	Titles	Seasons
Campeonato Paraense	1	2023
Super Copa Grão-Pará	1^{s}	2024
Campeonato Paraense Second Division	1	2015

- record
- ^{s} shared record

=== Others tournaments ===
==== State ====
- Copa Grão-Pará (1): 2025
- Taça Cidade de Belém (1): 2008
- Taça Estado do Pará (1): 2010

=== Runners-up ===
- Campeonato Paraense (2): 2008, 2010
- Super Copa Grão-Pará (1): 2026
