= Talisson Calcinha =

Brazilian footballer

Personal information
- Full name: Talisson Diago Nascimento Oliveira
- Date of birth: 15 May 1995 (age 31)
- Place of birth: Juazeiro do Norte, Brazil
- Position: Right back

Youth career
- –2015: Guarani de Juazeiro

Senior career*
Years	Team	Apps	(Gls)
2015–2020	Guarani de Juazeiro		
2015	→ Campo Grande-CE (loan)		
2017–2018	→ CSA (loan)		
2018	→ Treze (loan)		
2018	→ Caucaia (loan)		
2018–2020	→ Sampaio Corrêa (loan)		
2020	→ Atlético Cearense (loan)		
2020–2021	Icasa		
2021	Guarani de Juazeiro		
2021	Campo Grande-CE		
2021–2022	Iguatu		
2022	Cariri		
2022	Pacatuba		
2023–2024	Iguatu		
2024	→ Icasa (loan)		
- * Club domestic league appearances and goals as of 28 August 2025

Talisson Diago Nascimento Oliveira (born 15 May 1995), better known as Talisson Calcinha, is a Brazilian professional footballer who plays as a right back.

== Career ==
Born in Juazeiro do Norte, Talisson played for several teams in the northeast region. His nickname "Talisson Calcinha" is due to the player being a big fan of the forró band "Calcinha Preta". He gained national attention due to his nickname when he competed in the 2023 Copa do Brasil.

== Honours ==
Icasa

- Copa Fares Lopes: 2021

Iguatu

- Copa Fares Lopes: 2023
