= Santa Cruz Esporte Clube (AC) =

Santa Cruz Acre
- Full name: Santa Cruz Esporte Clube
- Founded: 1 November 2022; 3 years ago
- Ground: Arena da Floresta
- President: Leandro Raches Taveira Costa
- Head coach: Sandro Resende
- League: Campeonato Acreano
- 2025: Acreano Série B, 1st of 6 (champions)
- Website: santacruzacre.com.br
Home colors	Away colors

Santa Cruz Esporte Clube, is a Brazilian football club from Rio Branco, Acre. The club was founded on 1 November 2022.

== History ==
Founded on 1 November 2022, already as a SAF, by businessman Adem Araújo, the club started as a project for youth categories and won several youth titles in the 2023 and 2024 seasons. In 2025, the club started a senior team in the Campeonato Acreano Second Division, and achieved promotion after winning the competition.

In the 2026 Campeonato Acreano, Santa Cruz won the state league title in their first-ever participation in the competition, defeating Rio Branco in the final. This also granted a spot in the 2027 Série D, 2027 Copa do Brasil – their first-ever national competitions – and 2027 Copa Norte.

== Honours ==
- Campeonato Acreano
  - Winners (1): 2026
- Campeonato Acreano Second Division
  - Winners (1): 2025
