= Campeonato Acreano Série B =

Football league in Acre, Brazil

- Organising body: FFA
- Founded: 1951; 75 years ago
- Country: Brazil
- State: (Acre (state)) Acre
- Level on pyramid: 2
- Promotion to: Campeonato Acreano
- Current champions: Santa Cruz (1st title) (2025)
- Most championships: Andirá (2 titles)
- Website: FFA Official website

The Campeonato Acreano Série B, sometimes referred as Campeonato Acreano/Acriano Segunda Divisão, is the second tier of the professional state football league in the Brazilian state of Acre. It is run by the Acre Football Federation (FFA).

== History ==
Played in only three occasions during the amateur period (1951, 1970 and 1977), the competition returned to an active status in 2011. In 2019, however, the competition was not disputed.

== List of champions ==
Season	Champions	Runners-up
1951	Botafogo (1)	
1952-1969	Unknown	
1970	Floresta (1)	
1971-1976	Unknown	
1977	São Francisco (1)	
1978-2010	Not held	
2011	Andirá (1)	Galvez
2012	Galvez (1)	Vasco da Gama
2013	Vasco da Gama (1)	Amax
2014	Amax (1)	Independência
2015	Andirá (2)	ADESG
2016	Humaitá (1)	ADESG
2017	ADESG (1)	São Francisco
2018	Independência (1)	Náuas
2019-2024	Not held	
2025	Santa Cruz (1)	São Francisco

== Titles by team ==
Club	Wins	Winning years
Andirá	2	2011, 2015
Botafogo	1	1951
Floresta	1	1970
São Francisco	1	1977
Galvez	1	2012
Vasco da Gama	1	2013
Amax	1	2014
Humaitá	1	2016
ADESG	1	2017
Independência	1	2018
Santa Cruz	1	2025
