= 2024 Super Copa Grão-Pará =

Águia de Marabá	Canaã
1	0
- Date: 13 January 2024
- Venue: Estádio Municipal Zinho de Oliveira, Marabá
- Referee: Joelson Nazareno Ferreira Cardoso
- Attendance: 1,845

The 2024 Super Copa Grão-Pará was the 1st Super Copa Grão-Pará, a football match played between the winners of the previous season's Campeonato Paraense and Campeonato Paraense Second Division competitions.

Águia de Marabá defeated Canaã 1–0 for their 1st Super Copa Grão-Pará title.

== Teams ==
Team	Qualification method
Águia de Marabá	2023 Campeonato Paraense champions
Canaã	2023 Campeonato Paraense Second Division champions

== Match ==
13 January 2024
17:00 UTC−3

Águia de Marabá	1–0	Canaã
Bruno Limão 90+7'	Report

Estádio Municipal Zinho de Oliveira, Marabá
Attendance: 1,845
Referee: Joelson Nazareno Ferreira Cardoso

Águia de Marabá	Canaã

Assistant referees:
Hélcio Araújo Neves
Gilmar Soares Sousa
Fourth official:
Jânio Balzac Pereira

Match rules

- 90 minutes
- Penalty shoot-out if scores still level
