= Independência Futebol Clube =

Brazilian football club

Independência
- Full name: Independência Futebol Clube
- Nicknames: Timão (The Great Team); Timão do Rio Branco
- Founded: 2 August 1946; 80 years ago
- Ground: Florestão
- Capacity: 10,000
- President: José Eugênio de Leão Braga
- League: Campeonato Brasileiro Série D Campeonato Acreano
- 2025 2025: Série D, 29th of 64; Acreano, 1st of 8 (champions)
Home colours	Away colours

Independência Futebol Clube, commonly known as Independência, is a Brazilian association football club based in Rio Branco, Acre. The club currently competes in Campenato Acreano, the top division of the Acre state football league, and the Campeonato Brasileiro Série D. They play their home matches at the 10,000-capacity Estádio Antônio Aquino Lopes.

Independência's home kit is a shirt with green, white and red vertical stripes, white shorts and white socks, similar to Fluminense from Rio de Janeiro, who is also the inspiration for their crest. They also possess the nickname Timão (The Great Team), more commonly attributed to São Paulo-based side Corinthians.

== History ==
Independência Futebol Clube was founded on August 2, 1946 by a group of entrepreneurs from Rio Branco.

== Honours ==
- Campeonato Acreano
  - Winners (13): 1954, 1958, 1959, 1963, 1970, 1972, 1974, 1985, 1988, 1993, 1998, 2024, 2025
  - Runners-up (16): 1950, 1951, 1955, 1956, 1957, 1960, 1966, 1969, 1971, 1980, 1982, 1984, 1992, 1997, 1999, 2000
- Campeonato Acreano Segunda Divisão
  - Winners (1): 2018
  - Runners-up (1): 2014
- Torneio Início do Acre
  - Winners (3): 1958, 2001, 2004
