= Estádio Antônio Aquino Lopes =

Football stadium in Rio Branco, Acre, Brazil

Florestão
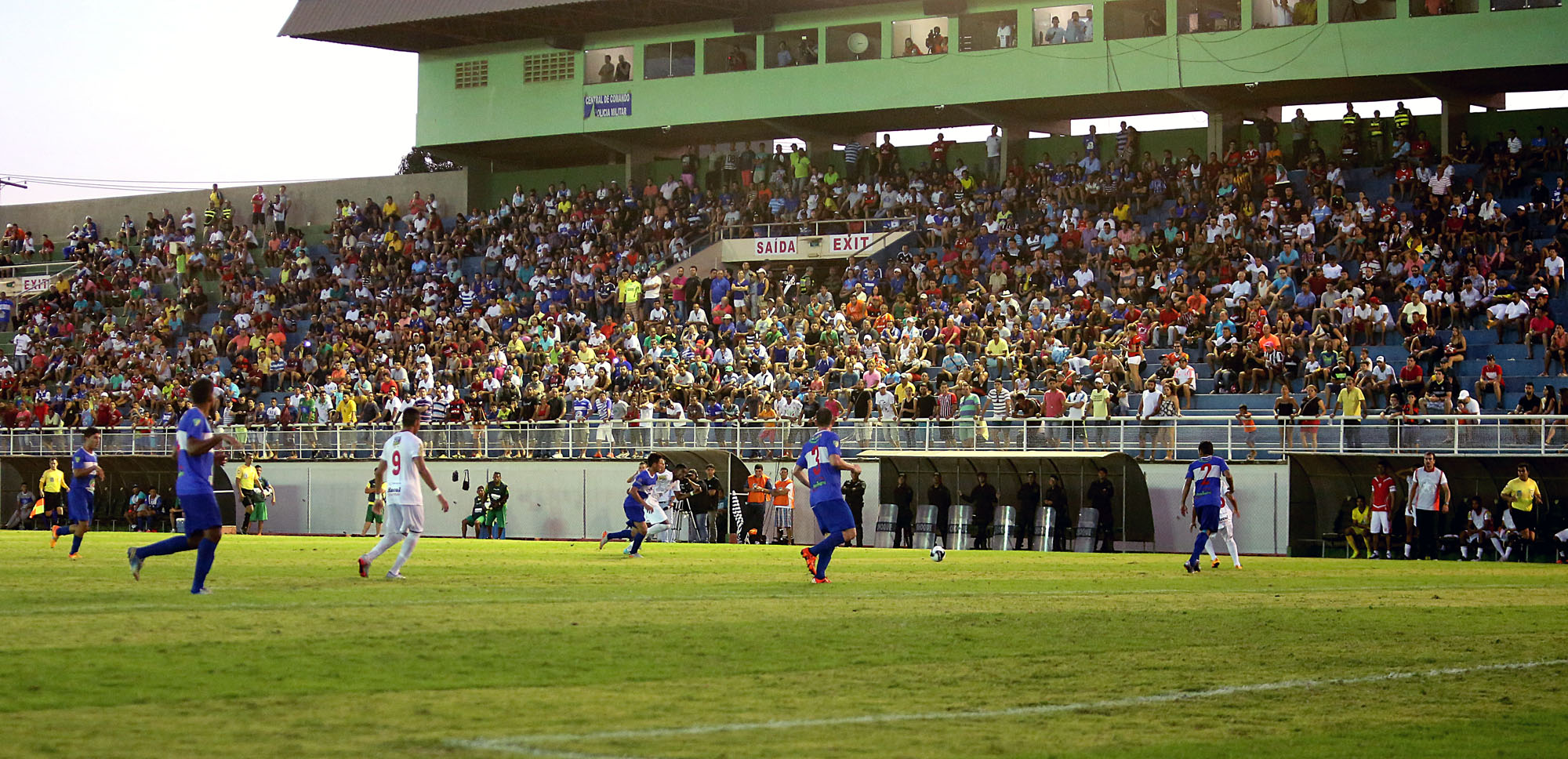
- Sisbrace
- Interactive map of Florestão
- Full name: Estádio Antônio Aquino Lopes
- Location: Rio Branco, Acre, Brazil
- Coordinates: 9°59′58.6″S 67°50′56.3″W
- Owner: Federação de Futebol do Acre
- Capacity: 8,000 (limited capacity); 10,000 (maximum)
- Surface: Grass
- Field size: 100 by 75 metres (109.4 yd × 82.0 yd)

Construction
- Opened: 2011

Tenants
- Atlético Acreano; Galvez; Rio Branco; São Francisco; Andirá; Vasco-AC; Humaitá; Náuas

Estádio Antônio Aquino Lopes also known as Florestão is a football stadium in Rio Branco, Acre, Brazil. The stadium was inaugurated on 2011 with a maximum capacity of 10,000 spectators.
