= Allan Rosário =

Brazilian footballer (born 1989)

Personal information
- Full name: Allan Rosário da Costa Silva
- Date of birth: 2 April 1989 (age 37)
- Place of birth: Nova Iguaçu, Brazil
- Height: 1.94 m (6 ft 4 in)
- Position: Defender

Team information
- Current team: São Raimundo
- Number: 4

Youth career
- –2011: Queimados Futebol Clube

Senior career*
Years	Team	Apps	(Gls)
2012	Mesquita FC	1	(0)
2012–2016	Alecrim FC	5	(0)
2016–2017	Parnahyba SC	5	(0)
2017	4 de Julho	5	(0)
2018	Queimados FC	11	(3)
2019–2020	Canaã EC	8	(1)
2021–2022	São Gonçalo EC	18	(2)
2023	São Raimundo	25	(6)
- * Club domestic league appearances and goals as of 01:32, 28 July 2023 (UTC)

Allan Rosário da Costa Silva (born 2 April 1989), known as Allan Rosário, is a Brazilian professional footballer who plays as a defender for São Raimundo.

== Career ==
Allan Rosário stood out in a 4–3 victory against Cuiabá in the Copa do Brasil, where he scored three of São Raimundo's four goals.

== Honours ==
- Campeonato Roraimense: 2023
