= Estádio do Trabalhador =

Soccer stadium in Resende, Rio de Janeiro state, Brazil

Coordinates: 22°27′49.72″S 44°27′22.04″W

Estádio Municipal do Trabalhador
- Estádio do Trabalhador
- Interactive map of Estádio Municipal do Trabalhador
- Location: Resende, Brazil
- Owner: Serviço Social da Indústria (SESI)
- Operator: Resende City Hall
- Capacity: 7,400
- Surface: Grass
- Field size: 105 x 70 m

Construction
- Opened: October 1, 1992

Tenant
- Resende Futebol Clube (1992–)

Estádio Municipal do Trabalhador, commonly known as Estádio do Trabalhador, is a football (soccer) stadium located in Resende, Rio de Janeiro state, Brazil. The stadium is owned by the Serviço Social da Indústria (SESI), but it is administered by the Resende City Hall. It has a maximum capacity of 7,400 people. The stadium's name is Portuguese for Municipal Worker's Stadium.

== History ==
The stadium was inaugurated on October 1, 1992, when Fluminense beat América 1–0. Resende Futebol Clube played their Campeonato Carioca home games at this stadium in 2008 and in 2009, as well as in 2010.
