= Lorran (footballer, born 1995) =

Brazilian footballer

Personal information
- Full name: Lorran David Ferreira Costa
- Date of birth: 2 May 1995 (age 31)
- Place of birth: Cuiabá, Brazil
- Height: 1.76 m (5 ft 9 in)
- Position: Forward

Youth career
- Guarani

Senior career*
Years	Team	Apps	(Gls)
2014–2017	Guarani	28	(3)
2016	→ Caxias (loan)	9	(2)
2017–2020	Santos	0	(0)
2019	→ Caldense (loan)	10	(1)
2020	→ Brasiliense (loan)	3	(0)
2020	Bangu	2	(0)
2021	Votuporanguense	9	(1)
2022	Ação	16	(4)
2022	CEOV	0	(0)
2023	Nova Mutum	3	(2)
2023	São José-SP	4	(1)
- * Club domestic league appearances and goals as of 15:43, 25 September 2023 (UTC)

Lorran David Ferreira Costa (born 2 May 1995), simply known as Lorran, is a Brazilian footballer who plays as a forward.

== Club career ==
Born in Cuiabá, Mato Grosso, Lorran represented Guarani as a youth. He made his senior debut on 12 April 2014, starting in a 3–2 Campeonato Paulista Série A2 home loss against Rio Branco-SP.

Lorran was promoted to the main squad for the 2016 season, and scored his first senior goal on 5 February in a 3–1 away defeat of Marília. On 20 April of that year, after being demoted to backup option, he was loaned to Série D side Caxias until the end of the year.

Upon returning, Lorran featured regularly during the Paulistão Série A2, but failed to appear in the Série B. On 3 October 2017, he signed a three-year deal with Santos and was assigned to the B-team.

On 24 January 2019, Lorran joined Caldense on loan. On 8 November, he moved to Brasiliense, also in a temporary deal, for the ensuing campaign.

On 1 June 2020, Lorran left Santos as his contract expired, without making a single appearance for the first team.

== Career statistics ==
As of 25 September 2023

Club	Season	League			State League		Cup		Continental		Other		Total	
Club	Season	Division	Apps	Goals	Apps	Goals	Apps	Goals	Apps	Goals	Apps	Goals	Apps	Goals
Guarani	2014	Série C	0	0	1	0	0	0	—		—		1	0
Guarani	2015	Série C	0	0	0	0	0	0	—		—		0	0
Guarani	2016	Série C	0	0	16	2	0	0	—		—		16	2
Guarani	2017	Série B	0	0	11	1	0	0	—		—		11	1
Guarani	Total		0	0	28	3	0	0	—		—		28	3
Caxias (loan)	2016	Série D	3	1	6	1	—		—		13 (Note: Appearance(s) in Copa Serrana)	4	22	6
Santos	2018	Série A	0	0	—		0	0	—		—		0	0
Caldense (loan)	2019	Série D	0	0	10	1	—		—		—		10	1
Brasiliense (loan)	2020	Série D	0	0	3	0	1	0	—		—		4	0
Bangu	2020	Série D	2	0	—		—		—		—		2	0
Votuporanguense	2021	Paulista A3	—		9	1	—		—		7 (Note: Appearance(s) in Copa Paulista)	3	16	4
Ação	2022	Série D	14	4	2	0	—		—		—		16	4
CEOV	2022	Série D	0	0	—		—		—		8 (Note: Seven appearances in Copa FMF, one appearance in Copa Verde)	0	8	0
Nova Mutum	2023	Mato-Grossense	—		3	2	2	5	—		—		5	7
São José-SP	2023	Paulista A3	—		4	1	—		—		—		4	1
Career total			19	5	65	9	3	5	0	0	21	4	108	23

== Honours ==
Caxias

- Campeonato Gaúcho Série A2: 2016
- Copa Serrana: 2016

Individual

- 2023 Copa do Brasil top scorer
