= 2015 Campeonato Brasileiro Série C =

Campeonato Brasileiro Série C
- Season: 2015
- Champions: Vila Nova
- Promoted: Brasil de Pelotas; Vila Nova; Londrina; Tupi
- Relegated: Águia de Marabá; Madureira; Caxias; Icasa
- Matches: 192
- Goals: 455 (2.37 per match)
- Top goalscorer: Guilherme Queiróz (Portuguesa) (12 goals)
- Biggest home win: Juventude 5-0 Madureira (August 29, 2015); Guaratinguetá 5-0 Madureira (September 20, 2015)
- Highest attendance: Fortaleza 0-0 Brasil de Pelotas (October 17, 2015, Castelão) - 62,903 people
- Lowest attendance: Caxias 1-2 Portuguesa (September 20, 2015, Centenário) - 110 people
- Average attendance: 4,021

The Serie C of the Brazilian Championship 2015 is a football competition held in Brazil, equivalent to the third division. It is contested by 20 clubs.

== Teams ==
Location of teams in 2015 Série C

Team	Home city	Manager
Águia de Marabá	Marabá	(Brazil) João Galvão
América-RN	Natal	(Brazil) Roberto Fernandes
ASA	Arapiraca	(Brazil) Vica
Botafogo-PB	João Pessoa	(Brazil) Ramiro Souza
Brasil de Pelotas	Pelotas	(Brazil) Rogério Zimmermann
Caxias	Caxias do Sul	(Brazil) Beto Campos
Confiança	Aracaju	(Brazil) Betinho
Cuiabá	Cuiabá	(Brazil) Ruy Scarpino
Fortaleza	Fortaleza	(Brazil) Marcelo Chamusca
Guarani	Campinas	(Brazil) Pintado
Guaratinguetá	Guaratinguetá	(Portugal) Sérgio Vieira
Icasa	Juazeiro do Norte	(Brazil) Maurílio
Juventude	Caxias do Sul	(Brazil) Antônio Carlos Zago
Londrina	Londrina	(Brazil) Claudio Tencati
Madureira	Rio de Janeiro	(Brazil) Bruno Reis
Portuguesa	São Paulo	(Brazil) Estevam Soares
Salgueiro	Salgueiro	(Brazil) Sergio China
Tombense	Tombos	(Brazil) Marcelo Mabilia
Tupi	Juiz de Fora	(Brazil) Felipe Surian
Vila Nova	Goiânia	(Brazil) Márcio Fernandes

=== Number of teams by state ===
Number of teams	State	Team(s)
3	Rio Grande do Sul	Brasil de Pelotas, Caxias and Juventude
3	São Paulo	Guarani, Guaratinguetá and Portuguesa
2	Ceará	Fortaleza and Icasa
2	Minas Gerais	Tombense and Tupi
1	Alagoas	ASA
1	Goiás	Vila Nova
1	Mato Grosso	Cuiabá
1	Pará	Águia de Marabá
1	Paraíba	Botafogo
1	Paraná	Londrina
1	Pernambuco	Salgueiro
1	Rio Grande do Norte	América de Natal
1	Rio de Janeiro	Madureira
1	Sergipe	Confiança

== League table ==
=== Group A ===
Pos	Team	Pld	W	D	L	GF	GA	GD	Pts	Qualification or relegation
1	(Ceará) Fortaleza (A)	18	10	6	2	30	14	+16	36	Qualifies to the Final stage
2	(Alagoas) ASA (A)	18	10	5	3	24	17	+7	35	Qualifies to the Final stage
3	(Goiás) Vila Nova (A)	18	10	3	5	24	13	+11	33	Qualifies to the Final stage
4	(Sergipe) Confiança (A)	18	9	4	5	25	16	+9	31	Qualifies to the Final stage
5	(Rio Grande do Norte) América de Natal	18	8	5	5	23	17	+6	29	
6	(Paraíba) Botafogo-PB	18	6	5	7	25	30	−5	23	
7	(Mato Grosso) Cuiabá	18	5	4	9	20	25	−5	19	2016 Copa Sudamericana second stage (Note: Cuiaba qualified as 2015 Copa Verde champions.)
8	(Pernambuco) Salgueiro	18	4	7	7	17	20	−3	19	
9	(Pará) Águia de Marabá (R)	18	3	6	9	19	28	−9	15	Relegation to 2016 Campeonato Brasileiro Série D
10	(Ceará) Icasa (R)	18	2	1	15	15	42	−27	7	Relegation to 2016 Campeonato Brasileiro Série D

(A) Advance to a further round; (R) Relegated

=== Group B ===
Pos	Team	Pld	W	D	L	GF	GA	GD	Pts	Qualification or relegation
1	(Paraná (state)) Londrina (A)	18	9	7	2	23	14	+9	34	Qualifies to the Final stage
2	(São Paulo (state)) Portuguesa (A)	18	9	3	6	30	23	+7	30	Qualifies to the Final stage
3	(Minas Gerais) Tupi (A)	18	8	6	4	18	15	+3	30	Qualifies to the Final stage
4	(Rio Grande do Sul) Brasil de Pelotas (A)	18	7	8	3	30	20	+10	29	Qualifies to the Final stage
5	(Rio Grande do Sul) Juventude	18	7	8	3	30	21	+9	29	
6	(São Paulo (state)) Guarani	18	7	8	3	23	17	+6	29	
7	(Minas Gerais) Tombense	18	3	8	7	16	19	−3	17	
8	(São Paulo (state)) Guaratinguetá	18	4	4	10	19	30	−11	16	
9	(Rio de Janeiro (state)) Madureira (R)	18	1	10	7	19	34	−15	13	Relegation to 2016 Campeonato Brasileiro Série D
10	(Rio Grande do Sul) Caxias (R)	18	0	8	10	14	29	−15	8	Relegation to 2016 Campeonato Brasileiro Série D

(A) Advance to a further round; (R) Relegated

== Final stage ==
Quarter-finals
(Rio Grande do Sul) Brasil de Pelotas	1	0	1
(Ceará) Fortaleza	0	0	0
(Goiás) Vila Nova	1	2	3
(São Paulo (state)) Portuguesa	0	1	1
(Minas Gerais) Tupi	2	2	4
(Alagoas) ASA	0	1	1
(Sergipe) Confiança	0	0	0
(Paraná (state)) Londrina	0	1	1

Semi-finals
(Rio Grande do Sul) Brasil de Pelotas	0	0	0 (3)
(Goiás) Vila Nova	0	0	0 (4)
(Minas Gerais) Tupi	0	0	0 (3)
(Paraná (state)) Londrina	0	0	0 (5)

Finals
(Goiás) Vila Nova	0	4	4
(Paraná (state)) Londrina	1	1	2
