= Estádio Municipal Zinho de Oliveira =

Football stadium in Brazil

Estádio Zinho de Oliveira
- Zinho de Oliveira
- Interactive map of Estádio Zinho de Oliveira
- Full name: Estádio Municipal Zinho de Oliveira
- Location: Marabá, Pará, Brazil
- Coordinates: 5°21′05″S 49°08′18″W
- Owner: Prefeitura de Marabá
- Capacity: 5,000
- Surface: Grass

Construction
- Built: 1960s
- Renovated: 2013
- Expanded: 2013

Tenants
- Águia de Marabá; Gavião Kyikatejê

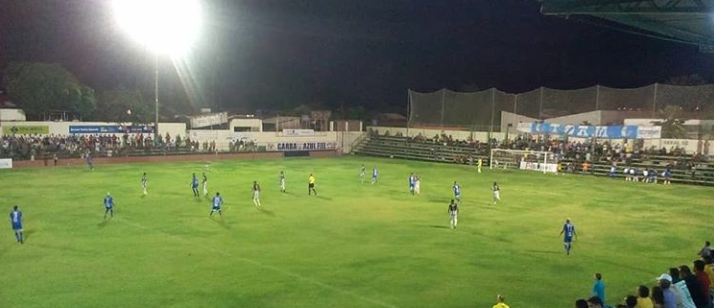
The Estádio Municipal Zinho de Oliveira

The Estádio Municipal Zinho de Oliveira, known as Zinho Oliveira, is a Brazilian football stadium located in the city of Marabá, in the state of Pará.

The stadium is nicknamed "Ninho das Aves" (Birds’ Nest) and "Velho Zinho" (Old Zinho) by fans, the latter because it was built in the 1970s and is located in the Antônio Maia avenue, in the Francisco Coelho neighbourhood, the urban core of Velha Marabá. It was a project by CAUSP-Marabá's architecture and urbanism department.

== Features ==
The stadium has much smaller dimensions than other stadiums in Brazil, measuring 100m x 62m, and is considered one of the smallest pitches in official CBF competitions (if you consider the Campeonato Brasileiro Série C, played until 2015 on Zinho's pitches).

The stadium is where Águia de Marabá Futebol Clube and Gavião Kyikatejê Futebol Clube host their matches. It has a capacity of 5,000 people.

The stadium was built in a floodplain area, and suffers from inundation during the flooding of the Tocantins and Itacaiúnas rivers. It is expected to be replaced by the "Estádio Olímpico de Marabá" (Marabá Olympic Stadium) project, under construction in the Vila São José neighbourhood (km 08).
