= Galvez Esporte Clube =

Brazilian association football club based in Rio Branco, Acre, Brazil

Galvez
- Full name: Galvez Esporte Clube
- Nicknames: Imperador (Emperor); Time Militar (Military Team)
- Founded: 3 July 2011; 15 years ago
- Ground: Arena da Floresta
- Capacity: 20,000
- President: Edener Franco
- Head coach: Elias Alves
- League: Campeonato Brasileiro Série D Campeonato Acreano
- 2025: Acreano, 2nd of 8
Home colors	Away colors

Galvez Esporte Clube, commonly known as Galvez, is a Brazilian professional football club based in Rio Branco, Acre founded on 3 July 2011. It competes in the Campeonato Acreano, the top flight of the Acre state football league.

Galvez is the second-best ranked team from Acre in CBF's national club ranking, behind Atlético Acreano.

== History ==
Galvez Esporte Clube was founded in 2011 by military police officers.

== Crest ==
The colors allude to the Acre flag. The shield, on the left side of the shirt, has a crown in reference to Luis Gálvez Rodríguez de Arias, Emperor of the Independent State of Acre. Inside the shield is the presence of the solitary star, symbol of the Acriana Revolution, a royal hawk attacking a ball, and two crossed arms, symbolizing the state military police.

== Stadium ==
Galvez play their home games at Estádio Florestão. The stadium has a maximum capacity of 10,000 people.

== Honours ==
=== State ===
- Campeonato Acreano
  - Winners (1): 2020
  - Runners-up (4): 2015, 2018, 2019, 2025
- Campeonato Acreano Second Division
  - Winners (1): 2012
  - Runners-up (1): 2011

=== Women's Football ===
- Campeonato Acreano de Futebol Feminino
  - Winners (2): 2024, 2025
