= Tomas Bastos =

Brazilian footballer

Personal information
- Full name: Tomas Almino Bastos Silva
- Date of birth: 30 April 1992 (age 34)
- Place of birth: Araguaína, Brazil
- Height: 1.78 m (5 ft 10 in)
- Position: Attacking midfielder

Team information
- Current team: Uberlândia

Youth career
- 2009: Ferroviária
- 2010–2012: Atlético Paranaense

Senior career*
Years	Team	Apps	(Gls)
2013–2019	J. Malucelli	6	(0)
2014	→ Boa Esporte (loan)	26	(15)
2015	→ Botafogo (loan)	14	(1)
2016	→ Ceará (loan)	9	(0)
2017	→ Coritiba (loan)	12	(2)
2018	→ Atlético Goianiense (loan)	21	(3)
2019	Paysandu	7	(5)
2020–2022	Operário Ferroviário	59	(3)
2023	CSA	17	(4)
2023	Chapecoense	4	(0)
2024–2026	Caxias	61	(11)
2026–	Uberlândia	23	(9)
- * Club domestic league appearances and goals as of 19 November 2026

Tomas Almino Bastos Silva (born 30 April 1992), known as Tomas Bastos, is a Brazilian professional footballer who plays as an attacking midfielder for Uberlândia Esporte Clube.

== Career ==
Bastos' contract with J. Malucelli expires in 2020.

== Honours ==
Botafogo

- Campeonato Brasileiro Série B: 2015
