= Alef Manga =

Brazilian footballer (born 1994)

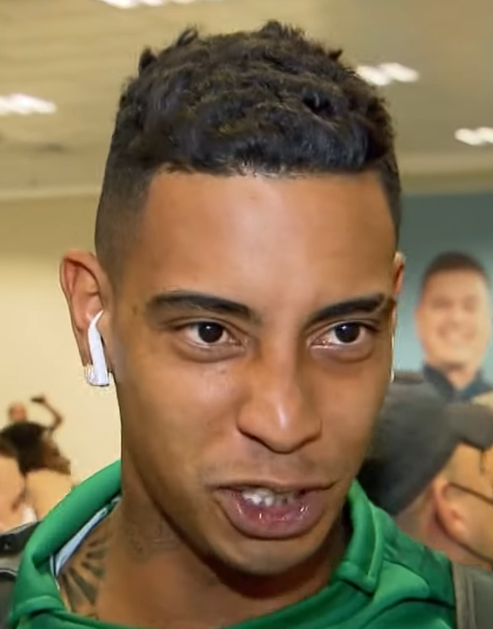
- Manga in 2021

Personal information
- Full name: Alef Mangueira Severino Pereira
- Date of birth: 29 November 1994 (age 31)
- Place of birth: Santos, Brazil
- Height: 1.90 m (6 ft 3 in)
- Position: Forward

Team information
- Current team: Remo
- Number: 11

Youth career
- 2007–2011: Santos
- 2012: Jabaquara
- 2013–2015: São Vicente

Senior career*
Years	Team	Apps	(Gls)
2015	Bandeirante	9	(1)
2016	Jabaquara	16	(6)
2017	Cascavel CR	13	(9)
2017	Maringá	0	(0)
2018	FC Cascavel	9	(1)
2018	→ Maringá (loan)	2	(0)
2018–2019	Oliveirense	3	(0)
2019–2020	Coruripe	12	(3)
2019	→ ASA (loan)	7	(2)
2019	→ Portuguesa (loan)	0	(0)
2020	→ Resende (loan)	9	(2)
2020	→ Volta Redonda (loan)	9	(6)
2021–2022	Volta Redonda	15	(12)
2021	→ Goiás (loan)	34	(10)
2022	→ Coritiba (loan)	50	(15)
2023–2024	Coritiba	26	(9)
2023	→ Pafos (loan)	6	(0)
2025	Avaí	31	(4)
2026–	Remo	14	(2)
- * Club domestic league appearances and goals as of 9 April 2026

Alef Mangueira Severino Pereira (born 29 November 1994), known as Alef Manga, is a Brazilian footballer who plays as a forward for Remo.

== Club career ==
=== Early career ===
Born in Santos, São Paulo, Alef Manga began his career at a futsal club in his hometown called Saldanha da Gama, at the age of five. In 2007, aged 12, he was invited to play for the futsal team of Santos, and later moved to football. However, he was released in 2011 and subsequently represented Jabaquara and São Vicente.

After finishing his formation, Alef Manga made his senior debut with Campeonato Paulista Segunda Divisão side Bandeirante; at that time, he was known as Dodô. He returned to Jabaquara for the 2016 season, and moved to the Paraná state in 2017 to join Cascavel CR.

Alef Manga was the top scorer of the second division of the Campeonato Paranaense for Cascavel, and was also the top scorer of the year's Taça FPF, while playing for Maringá. He moved to FC Cascavel for the 2018 Paranaense, but was loaned back to Maringá on 28 March of that year.

Alef Manga was released by Maringá in May 2018, after only two matches, and agreed to a move abroad in August, joining Oliveirense of the Portuguese LigaPro. After struggling with injuries, he returned to Brazil in 2019, and subsequently joined Coruripe.

Alef Manga moved to ASA in April 2019, but left the club in June after their elimination from the 2020 Série D. In July, he agreed to a deal with Portuguesa for the year's Copa Paulista, but left on 2 August without making a single appearance.

On 9 December 2019, Alef Manga agreed to join Resende for the 2020 Campeonato Carioca. He then returned to Coruripe the following July, but moved to Volta Redonda on 24 September 2020, as a replacement to Saulo Mineiro.

After impressing with Voltaço in the 2020 Série C, Alef Manga signed a permanent two-year deal with the club on 7 January 2021. He went on to score nine goals in the 2021 Carioca with the club.

=== Goiás ===
Alef Manga moved to Série B side Goiás on loan in May 2021. Regularly used, he contributed with ten goals in Goiás' promotion to the Série A.

=== Coritiba ===
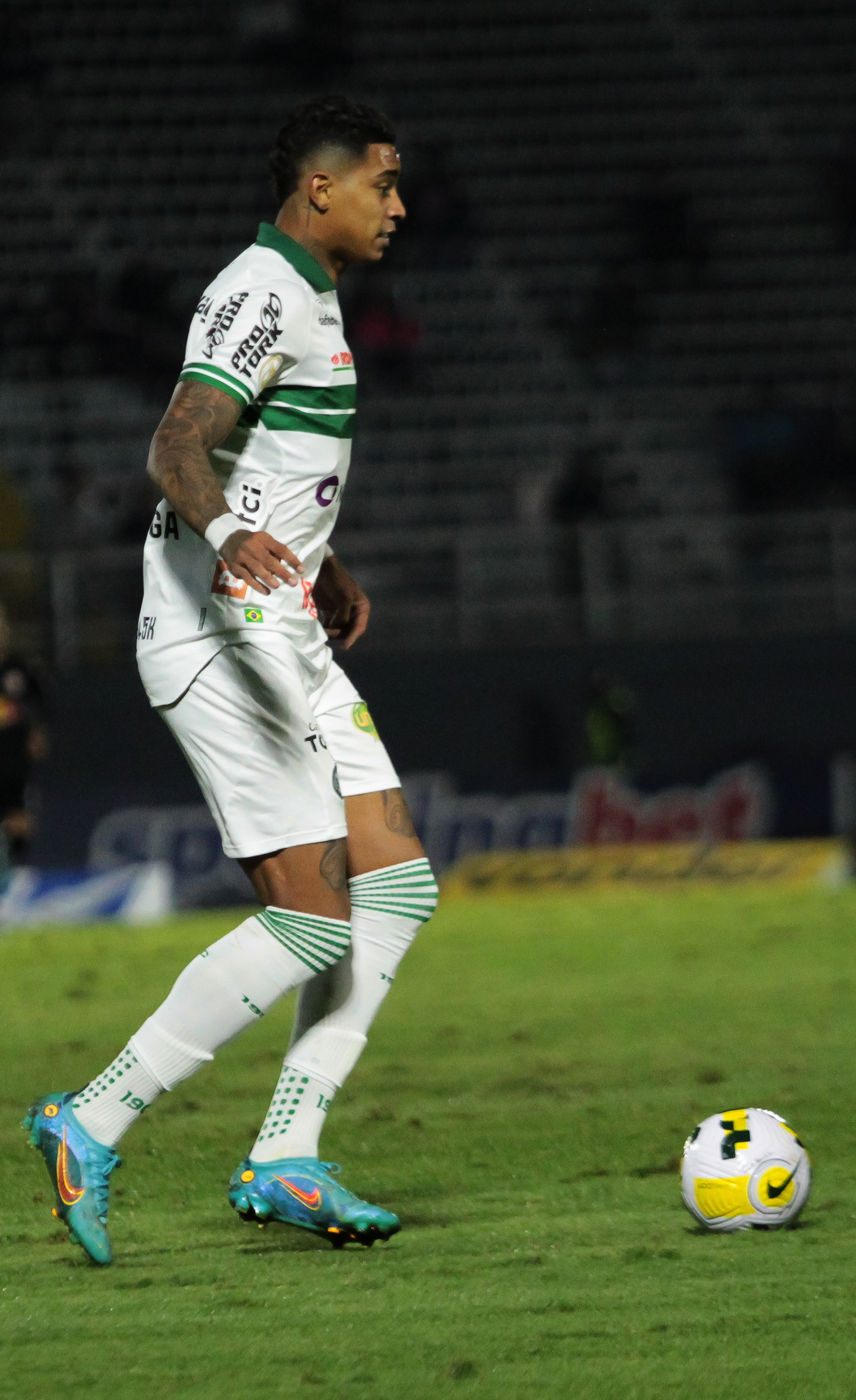
Manga with Coritiba in 2022

On 30 December 2021, Alef Manga joined Coritiba, also promoted to the top tier, on a one-year loan deal. On 10 November of the following year, after being an undisputed starter for most of the campaign, he signed a permanent two-year contract with the club.

On 13 May 2023, Alef Manga's contract with Coritiba was suspended, as a result of his involvement in the 2023 Brazilian football match-fixing scandal. On 28 July, he was loaned to Cypriot side Pafos for one year; while the player was not allowed to play in official competitions in Brazil as long as he stood trial, the ban did not extend to any foreign leagues.

== Career statistics ==
As of 6 October 2023

Club	Season	League			State League		Cup		Continental		Other		Total	
Club	Season	Division	Apps	Goals	Apps	Goals	Apps	Goals	Apps	Goals	Apps	Goals	Apps	Goals
Bandeirante	2015	Paulista 2ª Divisão	—		9	1	—		—		—		9	1
Jabaquara	2016	Paulista 2ª Divisão	—		16	6	—		—		—		16	6
Cascavel CR	2017	Paranaense Série Prata	—		13	9	—		—		—		13	9
Maringá	2017	Paranaense Série Prata	—		0	0	—		—		12 (Note: Appearance(s) in Taça FPF)	11	12	11
FC Cascavel	2018	Paranaense	—		9	1	—		—		—		9	1
Maringá (loan)	2018	Série D	2	0	—		—		—		—		2	0
Oliveirense	2018–19	LigaPro	3	0	—		—		—		—		3	0
Coruripe	2019	Série D	0	0	9	3	—		—		—		9	3
Coruripe	2020	Série D	1	0	2	0	—		—		—		3	0
Coruripe	Total		1	0	11	3	—		—		—		12	3
ASA (loan)	2019	Série D	7	2	—		—		—		—		7	2
Resende (loan)	2020	Carioca	0	0	9	2	—		—		—		9	2
Volta Redonda	2020	Série C	9	6	—		—		—		—		9	6
Volta Redonda	2021	Série C	0	0	11	9	2	3	—		—		13	12
Volta Redonda	Total		9	6	11	9	2	3	—		—		22	18
Goiás (loan)	2021	Série B	34	10	—		—		—		—		34	10
Coritiba	2022	Série A	35	9	15	6	4	1	—		—		54	17
Coritiba	2023	Série A	10	4	11	4	4	5	—		—		25	13
Coritiba	Total		45	13	26	10	8	6	—		—		79	30
Pafos (loan)	2023–24	Cypriot First Division	4	0	—		0	0	—		—		4	0
Career total			105	32	104	41	10	9	0	0	12	11	231	93

== Honours ==
=== Club ===
Maringá

- Taça FPF: 2017

Coritiba

- Campeonato Paranaense: 2022

Avaí

- Campeonato Catarinense: 2025

Remo

- Super Copa Grão-Pará: 2026

=== Individual ===
- Campeonato Paranaense Série Prata top goalscorer: 2017 (9 goals)
- Taça FPF top goalscorer: 2017 (11 goals)
- Copa do Brasil top goalscorer: 2023 (5 goals)
