= Renato (footballer, born 1990) =

Brazilian footballer

Personal information
- Full name: José Renato da Silva Júnior
- Date of birth: 19 January 1990 (age 36)
- Place of birth: Maceió, Brazil
- Height: 1.75 m (5 ft 9 in)
- Positions: Right back; right winger

Team information
- Current team: Santa Cruz
- Number: 19

Youth career
- 2009: Corinthians-AL
- 2009: São Luiz-AL
- 2010: Sport

Senior career*
Years	Team	Apps	(Gls)
2010–2014	Sport	73	(3)
2013	→ ABC (loan)	23	(1)
2014	→ ABC (loan)	10	(4)
2014–2017	Fluminense	40	(2)
2016	→ Avaí (loan)	51	(7)
2018	Ceará	3	(0)
2018	Avaí	35	(12)
2019–2020	Chapecoense	36	(0)
2020–2022	Avaí	62	(7)
2023	CRB	37	(13)
2024–2025	Ponte Preta	30	(5)
2025–	Santa Cruz	39	(8)
- * Club domestic league appearances and goals as of 9 November 2026

José Renato da Silva Júnior (born 19 January 1990), simply known as Renato, is a Brazilian professional footballer who plays as either a right back or a right winger for Santa Cruz.

== Honours ==
Sport

- Campeonato Pernambucano: 2010, 2014
- Copa do Nordeste: 2014

Ceará

- Campeonato Cearense: 2018

Chapecoense

- Campeonato Catarinense: 2020

Avaí

- Campeonato Catarinense: 2021
