= Resende FC =

Resende
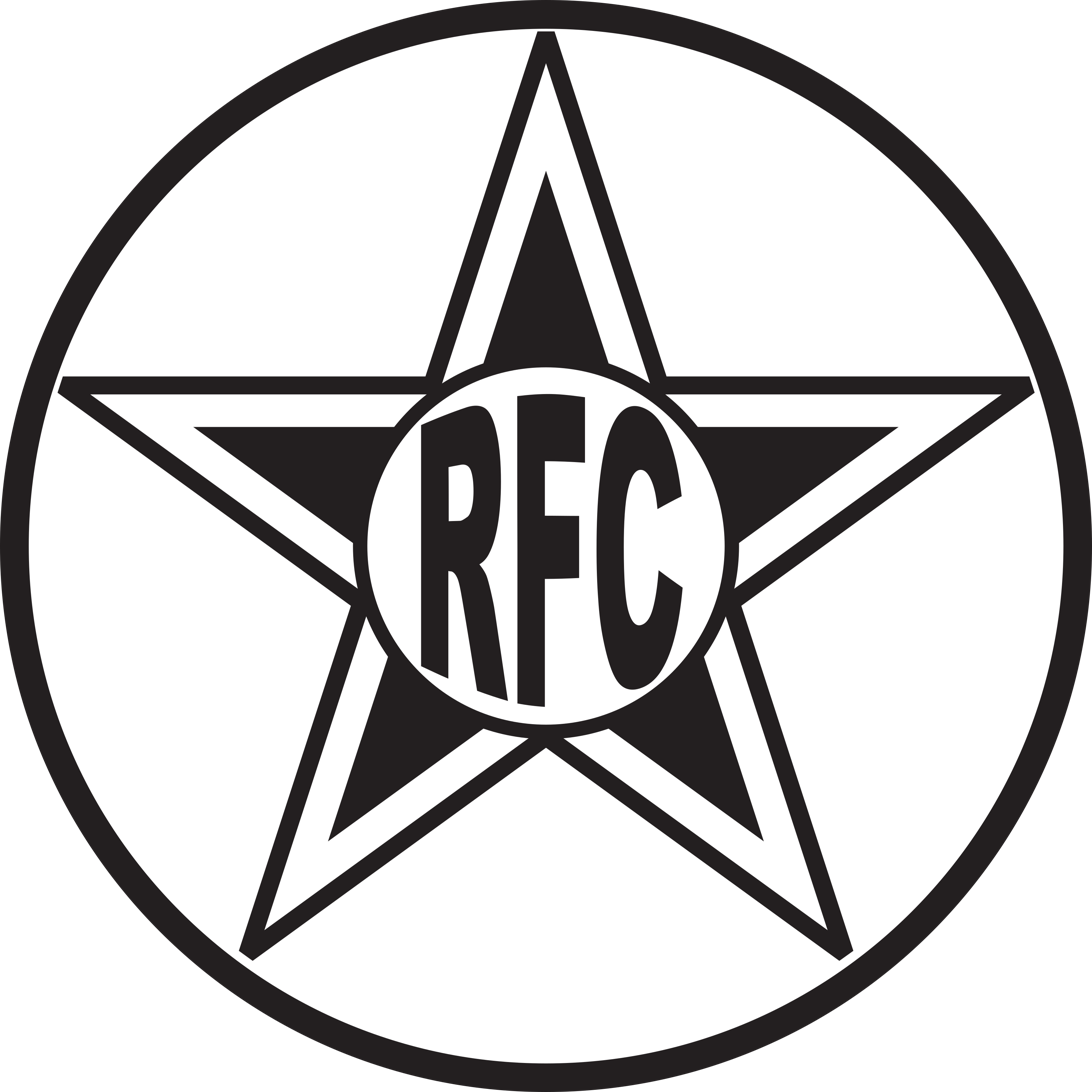
- Full name: Resende Futebol Clube
- Nickname: Gigante do Vale
- Founded: 6 June 1909; 117 years ago
- Ground: Estádio do Trabalhador
- Capacity: 7,400
- President: Ricardo Tufik
- Head coach: Sandro Sargentim
- League: Campeonato Carioca Série A2
- 2025: Carioca Série A2, 5th of 12
Home colors	Away colors

Resende Futebol Clube, commonly known as Resende, is a Brazilian professional football club in Resende, Rio de Janeiro. The team compete in Campeonato Carioca, the top tier of the Rio de Janeiro state football league.

== History ==
On 6 June 1909, the club was founded.

In 2007, Resende beat Mesquita 1–0, thus winning the Campeonato Carioca Second Level, and being promoted to the following year's Campeonato Carioca. On 20 January 2008, the club played its first Campeonato Carioca match, against Botafogo. Botafogo beat Resende 2–0. In 2009, the club finished as Taça Guanabara's runners-up, after being defeated 3–0 by Botafogo.

== Stadium ==
Resende's home stadium is Municipal do Trabalhador, inaugurated on 1 October 1992, with a maximum capacity of 7,400 people.

== Honours ==
=== Official tournaments ===
State
Competitions	Titles	Seasons
Copa Rio	2	2014, 2015
Campeonato Carioca Série A2	1	2007

=== Others tournaments ===
==== Inter-state ====
- Copa de Verão Vale do Paraíba (1): 2012

==== State ====
- Taça Rio (1): 2022
- Troféu Washington Rodrigues (1): 2011
