= Parnahyba Sport Club =

Parnahyba
- Full name: Parnahyba Sport Club
- Nickname: Tubarão do Litoral
- Founded: 1 May 1913; 113 years ago
- Ground: Piscinão, Parnaíba, Piauí state, Brazil
- Capacity: 4,700
- League: Campeonato Brasileiro Série D Campeonato Piauiense
- 2025 2025: Série D, 50th of 64; Piauiense, 4th of 8
Home colors	Away colors

Parnahyba Sport Club, commonly known as Parnahyba, is a Brazilian football club based in Parnaíba, Piauí state. They competed in the Copa do Brasil three times and in the Campeonato Brasileiro Série C once.

Parnahyba is currently ranked fifth among Piauí teams in CBF's national club ranking, at 215th place overall.

== History ==
The club was founded on 1 May 1913. Parnahyba won the Campeonato Piauiense in 2004, 2005, and in 2006. They competed in the Copa do Brasil in 2004, when they were eliminated in the First Stage by Nacional, in 2006, when they were eliminated in the First Stage by ABC, and in 2007, when they were eliminated in the First Stage by Náutico. The club competed in the Campeonato Brasileiro Série C in 2005, when they were eliminated in the First Stage of the competition. The club won the Campeonato Piauiense again in 2012 and in 2013.

== Honours ==
=== State ===
- Campeonato Piauiense
  - Winners (14): 1916, 1917, 1919, 1924, 1925, 1927, 1929, 1930, 1940, 2004, 2005, 2006, 2012, 2013
  - Runners-up (5): 1976, 2003, 2017, 2022, 2024

Note: Titles from 1916 to 1940 correspond to Liga Sportiva Parnahybana.

- Copa Piauí:
  - Winners (1): 2015

=== City ===
- Campeonato Parnaibano
  - Winners (9): 1941, 1942, 1944, 1945, 1946, 1954, 1961, 1965, 1967

== Stadium ==
Parnahyba Sport Club play their home games at Estádio Mão Santa, nicknamed Piscinão. The stadium has a maximum capacity of 4,700 people. They also play at Estádio Dirceu Arcoverde, nicknamed Verdinho. The stadium has a maximum capacity of 8,000 people.
