= Nova Mutum Esporte Clube =

Brazilian association football club based in Nova Mutum, Mato Grosso, Brazil

Nova Mutum
- Full name: Nova Mutum Esporte Clube
- Nickname: Azulão da Massa (Mass Big Blue)
- Founded: 10 September 1988; 38 years ago
- Ground: Estádio Municipal Valdir Doilho Wons
- Capacity: 1,200
- President: Anir Siqueira Coimba
- Head coach: Dema
- League: Campeonato Mato-Grossense
- 2025: Mato-Grossense, 5th of 9
- Website: novamutumesporteclube.com.br#/home
Home colors	Away colors

Nova Mutum Esporte Clube, commonly known as Nova Mutum, is a Brazilian football team based in Nova Mutum, Mato Grosso. The club was founded on 10 September 1988.

== History ==
Founded in 1988, the club only joined the Federação Matogrossense de Futebol in 2019 and started playing in that year's second division. In September, the club achieved promotion to the first division of the Campeonato Mato-Grossense as champions, after defeating Poconé 6–2 on aggregate.

In the 2020 Mato-Grossense, their debut season in the first division, Nova Mutum won the title by defeating União Rondonópolis 2–0 on aggregate. With this accolade, the club also qualified for the 2021 Campeonato Brasileiro Série D, the 2021 Copa Verde and the 2021 Copa do Brasil.

== Honours ==
- Campeonato Mato-Grossense
  - Winners (1): 2020
- Copa FMF
  - Winners (1): 2022
- Campeonato Mato-Grossense Second Division
  - Winners (1): 2019
