= Associação Desportiva Senador Guiomard =

Brazilian football club

ADESG
- Full name: Associação Desportiva Senador Guiomard
- Nickname: Leão do Quinari (Quinari's Lion)
- Founded: 26 January 1982; 44 years ago
- Ground: Naborzão
- Capacity: 2,000
- League: Campeonato Acreano
- 2025: Acreano, 4th of 8
Home colours	Away colours

Associação Desportiva Senador Guiomard, commonly known as ADESG, is a Brazilian association football club based in Senador Guiomard, Acre. The club competes in the Campeonato Acreano, the top flight of the Acre state football league.

The team's home kit is a black and white vertical striped shirt, black shorts and black socks. ADESG's mascot is a lion and they play their home games at the Estádio Naborzão which has a capacity of 2,000.

== History ==
Associação Desportiva Senador Guiomard was founded on January 26, 1982. The club won the Campeonato Acriano in 2006, after winning both stages of the competition.

== Honours ==
- Campeonato Acreano
  - Winners (1): 2006
  - Runners-up (2): 1993, 2005
- Campeonato Acreano Segunda Divisão
  - Winners (1): 2017
  - Runners-up (2): 2015, 2016
- Torneio Início do Acre
  - Winners (1): 2005
