= Sport Clube Humaitá =

Brazilian association football club based in Porto Acre, Acre, Brazil

Humaitá
- Full name: Sport Clube Humaitá
- Nicknames: Tourão (Big Bull); Tourão de Porto Acre (Big Bull from Porto Acre)
- Founded: 15 March 2003; 23 years ago
- Ground: Arena da Floresta
- Capacity: 20,000
- President: José Lima Oliveira
- Head coach: Rubens Xavier Júnior
- League: Campeonato Brasileiro Série D Campeonato Acreano
- 2025 2025: Série D, 64th of 64; Acreano, 5th of 8
- Website: https://www.facebook.com/schumaita/
Home colors	Away colors

Sport Clube Humaitá, commonly referred to as Humaitá, is a Brazilian professional club based in Porto Acre, Acre. They play in the Série D, the fourth tier of Brazilian football, as well as in the Campeonato Acreano, the top flight of the Acre state football league.

Founded in 2005, it was only professionalized in 2015 to compete for the State Second Division. In 2016, Humaitá were champions of the second division of Campeonato Acriano.

== Honours ==
- Campeonato Acreano
  - Winners (1): 2022
  - Runners-up (3): 2021, 2023, 2024
- Campeonato Acreano Second Division
  - Winners (1): 2016
