= São Francisco Futebol Clube (AC) =

Brazilian association football club based in Rio Branco, Acre, Brazil

São Francisco
- Full name: São Francisco Futebol Clube
- Nicknames: "São Chico" (Saint Chico), "Católico" (Catholic).
- Founded: 10 April 1967; 59 years ago
- Ground: Arena da Floresta
- Capacity: 20,000
- President: Aníbal Honorato
- Head coach: Erismeu Silva
- League: Campeonato Acreano
Home colours	Away colours	Third colours

São Francisco Futebol Clube, commonly known as São Francisco, is a Brazilian football club based in Rio Branco, Acre. The club currently competes in Campenato Acreano, the top division of the Acre state football league. Their colors are blue and red.

== History ==
The club was founded on 4 October 1967 by Vincente Barata. He was the club's jack of all trades, working at the same time as president, head coach, equipment manager, masseur, and player.

São Francisco reached twice the Torneio da Imprensa (also known as Torneio Início) finals, the first in 2006 and the second in 2007, being defeated by Rio Branco in both editions of the tournament. The club lost the first one for 4–3 on the penalty shootout, after a 0–0 draw in regular time. The second one was lost after a 2–0 defeat, the goals were scored by Ley and Pitbull.

The club closed its football department several times. The last one was in 2009, however it was reopened in 2011, when they competed in the Campeonato Acreano Second Division. São Francisco competed in both editions of this competition (1977 and 2011), and won the 1977 edition, so far the club's only title.

== Honours ==
- Campeonato Acreano Second Division
  - Winners (1): 1977
  - Runners-up (1): 2017

== Stadium ==
São Francisco Futebol Clube play their home games at Estádio Carlos Alberto Simão Antônio. The stadium has a maximum capacity of 1,000 people.

== See also ==
- Campeonato Acreano
- List of football clubs in Brazil
