= Sidney Bento =

Brazilian footballer (born 1974)

Personal information
- Full name: Sidney da Silva Bento
- Date of birth: 26 January 1974 (age 52)
- Place of birth: Manaus, Amazonas, Brazil
- Position: Midfielder

Senior career*
Years	Team	Apps	(Gls)
1994–1995	Nacional		
1997–2003	São Raimundo-AM		
2004	Nacional		
2005–2006	Grêmio Coariense		
2007–2008	Rio Negro-AM		
2008	América-AM		
2009	Clipper		

Managerial career
- 2017: Holanda
- 2017: São Raimundo-AM
- 2019: Penarol-AM
- 2019: 3B da Amazônia (women)
- 2020: Princesa do Solimões
- 2020: Clipper
- 2022: Parintins
- 2023: Clipper
- 2024: Rio Negro-AM
- * Club domestic league appearances and goals

Sidney da Silva Bento (born 26 January 1974), known as Sidney Bento, is a Brazilian former footballer and current football manager.

== Playing career ==
As a player, Bento was a midfielder, and most notably represented São Raimundo-AM, where he played between 1997 and 2003, winning the Campeonato Amazonense and Copa Norte on three occasions each.

== Managerial career ==
=== 2017: Holanda and São Raimundo ===
Bento's first venture into management came at Holanda, where he won the Campeonato Amazonense Série B in 2017 on a technicality, after fellow finalists Penarol-AM requested Holanda be given the title following the death of their chairman, Leão Braúna. Shortly after this, he joined São Raimundo-AM, with his first game in charge being against CDC Manicoré, where his brother, João Carlos Cavalo, was managing. On signing, he stated that the goal was to return the club to the Campeonato Amazonense for their centenary year, and that he wanted the club "to be respected again."

After an unconvincing win against Holanda, Bento gave a scathing review of the team to Brazilian media, stating "we ask [the players] to do one thing, and they do the complete opposite," also criticising the lack of depth in the squad. He won the Campeonato Amazonense Série B again with São Raimundo, after it was decided a second edition would be played to determine who would feature in the 2018 edition of the Campeonato Amazonense. Despite the final ending 0–0 against CDC Manicoré, the trophy was awarded due to the regulations of the Amazonense Football Federation, with it being São Raimundo's first title since 2006.

=== 2019–2020: Penarol, 3B da Amazônia, Princesa do Solimões and Clipper ===
Three days after the Campeonato Amazonense Série B title win, Bento announced his departure from São Raimundo. He took up the position of assistant manager to his brother, João Carlos Cavalo, at Manaus for the 2019 season. The duo left Manaus after just four games, and were named manager and assistant manager of Iranduba in February 2019. However, the following month, Bento left Iranduba to work alongside Adinamar Abib as joint-manager of Penarol-AM, as Adib was unable to travel for away games due to poor health. In September 2019, Bento was named manager of 3B da Amazônia, the first time he had managed a women's team. Bento led 3B da Amazônia to their first ever Campeonato Amazonense title, beating Iranduba—who had won the last eight editions of the competition, including two against 3B da Amazônia—in the final.

Following this success, he was named manager of Princesa do Solimões ahead of the 2020 season, marking a return to men's football. His career with Princesa got off to a poor start, as the club lost their first two games under his leadership. After a win and another loss in their next two games, Bento was sacked by Princesa on 4 February 2020, with Joacir Moura being brought in as his replacement. In July 2020, during the COVID-19 pandemic in Brazil, Bento, alongside former São Raimundo teammates Alberto, Neto and Isaac, joined a project to help coach football as a form of therapy to those recovering from illness or injury.

In September 2020, he was named manager of another of his former clubs, Clipper. Shortly after signing, he said that he expected that year's Campeonato Amazonense Série B campaign to be "one of the most difficult in recent years." After a 2–1 win over Rio Negro-AM, Clipper's promotion to the Campeonato Amazonense was confirmed, as they returned to the competition for the first time in fourteen years. On 22 November 2020, a 2–1 win over JC saw Clipper named champions of the Campeonato Amazonense Série B for the first time in their history.

=== 2022–2024: Parintins, brief return to Clipper and Rio Negro ===
2022 saw Bento managing Parintins in the Campeonato Amazonense Série B. After a 10–0 win against CDC Manicoré confirmed third place, the club achieved promotion to the Campeonato Amazonense following a victory on penalties against Unidos do Alvorada after a 2–2 aggregate score-line over two legs. The final against Rio Negro would again see Bento line up against his brother, João Carlos Cavalo, with Bento having won the last two final matches between the two; the Série B title in 2017 and the 2019 Campeonato Amazonense final, which saw Bento's 3B da Amazônia beat Cavalo's Iranduba. Bento could not prevent his side losing 3–1 to Rio Negro in the final on 21 September 2022.

In May 2023, Bento returned to Clipper for their Campeonato Amazonense Série B campaign. However, his second spell with Clipper was short-lived, and at the end of the year he was announced as the new manager of Rio Negro ahead of the 2024 season. After the club faced several legal battles at the end of 2023, as well as rifts between fan groups, the club were forced to cut their pre-season training short, eventually only having ten days to prepare for the season. Bento stated that it would be "impossible to have ideal preparation for a game in a league as difficult as ours," though called for fans to come together to support the team. Rio Negro's campaign was blighted by off-field issues, but after a poor start, Bento was given the backing of the board in January 2024. In March of the same year, Bento gave an interview to TV A Crítica, explaining that the club were going through a rebuilding process, and that many players had come and gone from the squad.

On 19 March, seventy minutes into their match against Parintins, Rio Negro players refused to re-enter the field of play after a rehydration break. Parintins had been 7–0 up and strongly condemned the conduct of the Rio Negro players. The circumstances of the forfeit led to claims of match-fixing, with Bento defending his team against the accusations, explaining that due to the lack of facilities to train on, and the fact that some players were not eating adequately, they were susceptible to injuries. An investigation was launched by The Sports Justice Tribunal of Amazonas (TJD-AM), and it was revealed one of the additional referees had overheard Rio Negro player, Marquinho, instructing his teammates to "fall down and leave the field so that the game ends quickly."

== Personal life ==
Bento brother is former footballer João Carlos Cavalo, who played for a number of Brazilian clubs, as well as in Japan and Switzerland. The pair played alongside each other briefly at São Raimundo-AM.

== Honours ==
=== Player ===
Nacional

- Campeonato Amazonense: 1995

São Raimundo

- Campeonato Amazonense: 1997, 1998, 1999
- Copa Norte: 1999, 2000, 2001

Grêmio Coariense

- Campeonato Amazonense: 2005
- Taça Estado do Amazonas: 2005
- Taça Cidade de Manaus: 2005

Rio Negro

- Campeonato Amazonense Série B: 2008

=== Manager ===
Holanda

- Campeonato Amazonense Série B: 2017 (Note: Penarol requested that the Federação Amazonense de Futebol (FAF) award the title to Holanda due to the death of their president, Leão Braúna.)

São Raimundo

- Campeonato Amazonense Série B: 2017(E) (Note: A second edition was disputed in the 2017 season to decide what teams would play in the 2018 Amazonense, since the first edition played in the 2017 season served as a qualifying stage to the 2017 Amazonense.)

3B da Amazônia

- Campeonato Amazonense: 2019

Clipper

- Campeonato Amazonense Série B: 2020
