= João Carlos Cavalo =

Brazilian footballer

Personal information
- Full name: João Carlos da Silva Bento
- Date of birth: 19 June 1967 (age 59)
- Place of birth: Lábrea, Amazonas, Brazil
- Position: Midfielder

Senior career*
Years	Team	Apps	(Gls)
1988–1990	Rio Negro-AM		
1990–1993	Matsubara		
1993–1995	Athletico Paranaense		
1995–1996	Tokyo Gas		
1997	Ituano		
1997	São Raimundo-AM		
1998	Ypiranga		
1998	São Carlos		
1998–1999	Joinville		
1999	Blumenau		
1999–2001	Yverdon-Sport		
2002	Rio Negro-AM		
2004	Nacional		

Managerial career
- 2003: Rio Negro-AM
- 2004: Nacional
- 2004: Rio Branco
- 2005: São Raimundo-AM
- 2005: Grêmio Coariense
- 2005–2007: Rio Branco
- 2008: Ulbra
- 2008: Fast Clube
- 2009: Holanda
- 2009: Princesa do Solimões
- 2010: Grêmio Coariense
- 2010: Atlético Ceilandense
- 2010–2011: Dubai Club
- 2011: Holanda
- 2012: Luziânia
- 2012: Uberlândia
- 2013: Luziânia
- 2013: Sobradinho
- 2013: Bosque Formosa
- 2014: Sobradinho
- 2014: Brasiliense
- 2014: Rio Branco
- 2015: Atlético Acreano
- 2015: Fast Clube
- 2016: Rio Branco
- 2016–2017: Fast Clube
- 2017: Rio Negro-AM
- 2017–2018: CDC Manicoré
- 2019: Manaus
- 2019: Iranduba
- 2019–2020: Iranduba (women)
- 2020: Recanto da Criança (women)
- 2021: Iranduba (women)
- 2022: Manauara
- 2022–2023: Rio Negro-AM
- 2023: Nacional
- 2024: Princesa do Solimões
- 2024: 3B da Amazônia (women)
- 2024: Fast Clube
- 2025: Gurupi
- 2025: Fast Clube
- 2026–: 3B da Amazônia (women)
- * Club domestic league appearances and goals

João Carlos da Silva Bento (born 19 June 1967), known as João Carlos Cavalo, is a Brazilian former footballer and current manager of 3B da Amazônia.

== Early life ==
Cavalo was born in Lábrea in the Brazilian state of Amazonas.

== Playing career ==
As a player, Cavalo was a midfielder, beginning his career with Rio Negro, making his debut at the age of 20. A four-year stint with Matsubara followed, before spending time with Athletico Paranaense. He spent 18 months in Japan with Tokyo Gas in the mid-1990s. Returning to Brazil, he played for Ituano before helping São Raimundo to the 1997 Campeonato Amazonense title. Spells with Ypiranga, São Carlos, Joinville and Blumenau followed, before a move to Europe with Swiss club Yverdon-Sport. He finished his career with the club he started at, Rio Negro, before retiring and taking up the role of head coach at the same club. He briefly came out of retirement in 2004 to act as player-manager for Nacional.

== Managerial career ==
Beginning his management career with Rio Branco, Calavo went on to manage Nacional before winning the Campeonato Acreano with Rio Branco in 2004. In 2005, for the first time in its 90-year history, the Campeonato Amazonense was won by a team outside of Manaus, when Cavalo led Grêmio Coariense to their first ever title; beating Nacional 3–2 despite having goalkeeper Rascifran sent off and outfielder Trator playing in goal for the last minutes of the game. Just a week later he returned to Rio Branco, winning the Campeonato Acreano again.

He remained head coach of Rio Branco until 2007, before being named head coach of Ulbra for the 2008 season. Following a disagreement with management at Ulbra, Cavalo joined Fast Clube in the Campeonato Brasileiro Série C. He spent 2009 with Holanda and Princesa do Solimões. After being dismissed by Atlético Ceilandense in March 2010, Cavalo had a spell in the United Arab Emirates with Dubai Club.

He joined Luziânia in January 2012. With Luziânia he led them to an undefeated Taça JK campaign – the first round of the Campeonato Brasiliense. Later in the same year he joined Uberlândia, but left the club in October 2012 after just four games in the Taça Minas Gerais, citing personal reasons for his departure. He returned to Luziânia ahead of the 2013 season. However, in February 2013 he joined Sobradinho. He ended the season with Bosque Formosa, winning the 2013 edition of the Campeonato Brasiliense Second Division.

After a brief return to Sobradinho, Cavalo managed Brasiliense beginning in February 2014, and had his third spell with Rio Branco, joining in May of the same year. In June 2014 he accepted an offer from Mexican club América to help coordinate the club's B team. In March 2015, Cavalo was announced as manager of Atlético Acreano. However, after just two games, he returned to former club Fast Clube in April 2015. At the end of 2015, he was named as Rio Branco coach for the fourth time, starting in 2016. During his time with the club, eleven players were released after using the club's accommodation facilities to host parties with "alcohol and naked women".

On 22 October 2016, Cavalo led Fast Clube to the Campeonato Amazonense title – the club's seventh, and their first major honour in 45 years. Shortly after, it was announced that Cavalo would remain with the club for the 2017 season. During his time with the club, he faced his brother, Sidney Bento, as a manager for the first time, as Cavalo's Fast beat Bento's Holanda 3–0 on 5 April 2017. After Cavalo's departure from Fast Clube was announced in May 2017, he criticised the club heavily in Brazilian media, claiming new vice-president Domarques Mendonça had failed to pay both players and staff for at least two months, going as far as to claim the players were malnourished as a result. It was reported that Cavalo and Mendonça had nearly come to a physical altercation, and that Cavalo had actually been fired a few games prior, with players stepping in to demand he remain as coach.

Having departed Fast Clube, Cavalo returned to the first club he ever managed, Rio Negro, on 4 May 2017 – a day after he left Fast Clube. Following Mozart Carlos' move to CDC Manicoré as director, he brought in Cavalo as head coach in September 2017. Having helped the club to second place in the Campeonato Amazonense Série B, Carlos confirmed Cavalo would remain as head coach for the 2018 season.

In October 2018, Cavalo and his brother, Sidney Bento, were named head coach and assistant head coach of Manaus, respectively, to begin in the 2019 season. However, just four games into his career at Manaus, he offered his resignation, having won two of three Campeonato Amazonense games, and being eliminated from the Copa do Brasil. In February 2019, having been fired by Manaus, Calvo was named manager of Iranduba, with his brother again being named as his assistant coach. In June of the same year, he was announced as the head coach of Iranduba's women's under-18 side – the first women's team he had managed in his career. During the same year, he was promoted to manage the women's first team.

In December 2019 he signed a new contract with the club, having led them to second place in the Campeonato Amazonense Feminino. The club began the 2020 season with four consecutive defeats. The club formed a partnership with 3B da Amazônia, with seventeen members of 3B da Amazônia's team being loaned to Iranduba, despite being in the division below. In October 2020, after being unable to prevent Iranduba being relegated to the Campeonato Brasileiro Feminino Série A2, Cavalo moved to Recanto da Criança to help them compete in the Campeonato Amazonense Feminino.

He returned to manage Iranduba's women's team the following season, beginning the season's Série A2 campaign with a resounding 7–1 win against Oratório. He briefly managed the club's women's under-18 team again during the season, but continued managing the first team. For their first game in the Campeonato Amazonense Feminino, Iranduba were forced to forfeit the match against 3B da Amazônia; with a squad of only fourteen players, only six were available due to the others taking high school exams, one less than the seven required to begin a game of football.

Cavalo returned to men's football in 2022, being named head coach of Manauara in February. However, only two months later he rejoined Rio Negro, bringing assistant manager José de Ribamar with him. Having won the 2022 Campeonato Amazonense Série B with eleven wins from eleven, he signed a contract extension with Rio Negro in October 2022. In April 2023 he replaced Wellington Fajardo as manager of Nacional, returning to the club he had previously managed in 2004 and 2010. Cavalo left Nacional in September 2023, later accusing the club of failing to pay the last ten days of his employment with them. He then rejoined Princesa do Solimões signing a deal in October 2023, to begin in the 2024 season.

Having managed Princesa do Solimões for eleven games, Cavalo left the club on 1 April 2024. Later in the same month, Cavalo was named head coach of women's team 3B da Amazônia, marking a return to women's football. Having helped the club to a second-place finish in the Série A2, Cavalo left the team in August 2024, being replaced by club president Bosco Bindá. Having been linked with a return to the club in April 2024, he signed a deal with Fast Clube in August 2024, beginning his fifth spell with the Manaus-based club. In January 2025, he was named head coach of Gurupi. Cavalo returned to Fast Clube again as head coach in May 2025, but was dismissed one month later, following a 5–2 loss to Operário-AM – just his second game in charge of the club.

In February 2026, Cavalo returned to 3B da Amazônia.

== Personal life ==
Cavalo's brother is former footballer Sidney Bento, who most notably played for São Raimundo-AM, briefly playing alongside Cavalo. His son is Matheus Ponei, who briefly played for Fast Clube and CDC Manicoré.

== Honours ==
=== Player ===
Rio Negro

- Campeonato Amazonense: 1988, 1989, 1990
- Copa Amazonas: 1988

São Raimundo

- Campeonato Amazonense: 1997

=== Manager ===
Rio Branco

- Campeonato Acreano: 2004, 2005, 2007, 2014

Grêmio Coariense

- Campeonato Amazonense: 2005

Ulbra

- Campeonato Rondoniense: 2008

Bosque Formosa

- Campeonato Brasiliense Second Division: 2013

Fast Clube

- Campeonato Amazonense: 2015

Rio Negro

- Campeonato Amazonense Série B: 2022
