= 2014 Campeonato Amazonense =

Campeonato Amazonense de Futebol
- Season: 2014
- Champions: Nacional
- Relegated: Holanda; Sul América
- Copa do Brasil: Nacional; Princesa do Solimões
- Série D: Nacional
- Copa Verde: Nacional

The 2014 Campeonato Amazonense de Futebol was the 98th season of Amazonas' top professional football league. The competition began on February 1, and ended on May 24. Nacional won the championship by the 42nd time, while Holanda and Sul América were relegated.

== Format ==
The championship will have the teams split in two groups. On the first round, the teams in each group plays against the other teams in the group. The two best teams from each teams advances to the semifinals. The round final are in two-leg matches.

On the second round, the teams plays against the teams in the other group. The two best from each group advances to the semifinals, and the round finals are in two-leg matches. The winner from first round then plays against the second round winner.

== Participating teams ==
Club	Home city	2013 result
Fast Clube	Manaus	4th
Holanda	Rio Preto da Eva	8th
Iranduba	Iranduba	7th
Manaus	Manaus	1st (2nd division)
Nacional	Manaus	2nd
Nacional Borbense	Borba	2nd (2nd division)
Penarol	Itacoatiara	3rd
Princesa do Solimões	Manacapuru	1st
São Raimundo	Manaus	6th
Sul América	Manaus	5th

== First round ==
=== Group A ===
Pos	Team	Pld	W	D	L	GF	GA	GD	Pts	Qualification
1	Princesa do Solimões (A)	4	3	1	0	8	3	+5	10	Qualifies to the Playoffs
2	Fast Clube (A)	4	3	0	1	14	7	+7	9	Qualifies to the Playoffs
3	Manaus	4	1	2	1	9	7	+2	5	
4	Iranduba	4	1	0	3	5	9	−4	3	
5	Sul América	4	0	1	3	2	12	−10	1	

(A) Advance to a further round

==== Results ====
Home \ Away	FAS	IRA	MAN	PRI	SUA
Fast Clube				0–1	6–2
Iranduba	1–4		0–3		
Manaus	3–4				0–0
Princesa do Solimões		2–0	3–3		
Sul América		0–4		0–2	

Legend: Blue = home team win; Yellow = draw; Red = away team win.

=== Group B ===
Pos	Team	Pld	W	D	L	GF	GA	GD	Pts	Qualification
1	Nacional (A)	4	3	0	1	10	4	+6	9	Qualifies to the Playoffs
2	Nacional Borbense (A)	4	2	2	0	7	5	+2	8	Qualifies to the Playoffs
3	Penarol	4	1	2	1	4	4	0	5	
4	Holanda	4	0	2	2	1	5	−4	2	
5	São Raimundo	4	0	2	2	1	5	−4	2	

Rules for classification: 1) points; 2) goal difference; 3) number of goals scored.
(A) Advance to a further round

==== Results ====
Home \ Away	HOL	NAC	NAB	PEN	SRA
Holanda		0–2			0–0
Nacional			2–3		3–0
Nacional Borbense	1–1			1–1	
Penarol	2–0	1–3			
São Raimundo			1–2	0–0	

Legend: Blue = home team win; Yellow = draw; Red = away team win.

=== Playoffs ===
Semifinals
Princesa do Solimões	1	3	4
Nacional Borbense	2	1	3
Nacional	2	0	2
Fast Clube	4	0	4

Finals
Princesa do Solimões	0	0	0
Fast Clube	0	0	0

==== Semifinals ====
===== First leg =====
March 01, 2014
15:30 UTC−03:00

Nacional Borbense	2–1	Princesa do Solimões

March 02, 2014
15:30 UTC−03:00

Fast Clube	4–2	Nacional

Estádio da ULBRA, Manaus

===== Second leg =====
March 05, 2014
15:30 UTC−03:00

Princesa do Solimões	3–1	Nacional Borbense

Estádio Gilbertão, Manacapuru

March 05, 2014
15:30 UTC−03:00

Nacional	0–0	Fast Clube

Estádio da ULBRA, Manaus

==== Finals ====
March 15, 2014
15:00 UTC−03:00

Fast Clube	0–0	Princesa do Solimões

Arena da Amazônia, Manaus
Attendance: 11,800
Referee: Edmar Encarnação

March 22, 2014
15:00 UTC−03:00

Princesa do Solimões	0–0	Fast Clube

Estádio Gilbertão, Manacapuru
Attendance: 6,302
Referee: Antônio Carlos Frutuoso

== Second round ==
=== Group A ===
Pos	Team	Pld	W	D	L	GF	GA	GD	Pts	Qualification
1	Princesa do Solimões (A)	5	5	0	0	11	4	+7	15	Qualifies to the Playoffs
2	Manaus (A)	5	2	1	2	6	9	−3	7	Qualifies to the Playoffs
3	Fast Clube	5	1	3	1	9	9	0	6	
4	Iranduba	5	1	2	2	3	5	−2	5	
5	Sul América	5	1	0	4	2	10	−8	3	

Rules for classification: 1) points; 2) goal difference; 3) number of goals scored.
(A) Advance to a further round

=== Group B ===
Pos	Team	Pld	W	D	L	GF	GA	GD	Pts	Qualification
1	Nacional (A)	5	2	2	1	8	4	+4	8	Qualifies to the Playoffs
2	Penarol (A)	5	2	2	1	9	6	+3	8	Qualifies to the Playoffs
3	Nacional Borbense	5	2	1	2	7	6	+1	7	
4	São Raimundo	5	2	0	3	8	9	−1	6	
5	Holanda	5	1	1	3	5	6	−1	4	

Rules for classification: 1) points; 2) goal difference; 3) number of goals scored.
(A) Advance to a further round

=== Results ===
Home \ Away	FAS	IRA	MAN	PRI	SUA	HOL	NAC	NAB	PEN	SRA
Fast Clube						3–3		1–0	3–3	
Iranduba							0–1			2–1
Manaus						1–0	1–1			
Princesa do Solimões							2–1	3–0		3–2
Sul América								0–2	1–3	0–1
Holanda		2–0		0–1	0–1					
Nacional	1–1				4–0					
Nacional Borbense		1–1	4–1							
Penarol		0–0	2–0	1–2						
São Raimundo	2–1		2–3							

Legend: Blue = home team win; Yellow = draw; Red = away team win.

=== Playoffs ===
Semifinals
Princesa do Solimões	4	1	5
Penarol	1	1	2
Nacional	2	3	5
Manaus	0	1	1

Finals
Princesa do Solimões	1	1	2
Nacional	2	2	4

==== Semifinals ====
===== First leg =====
April 19, 2014
15:30 UTC−03:00

Penarol	1–4	Princesa do Solimões

Estádio Floro de Mendonça, Itacoatiara

April 19, 2014
15:00 UTC−03:00

Manaus	0–2	Nacional

===== Second leg =====
April 23, 2014
20:00 UTC−03:00

Nacional	3–1	Manaus

April 27, 2014
15:00 UTC−03:00

Princesa do Solimões	1–1	Penarol

==== Finals ====
May 03, 2014
15:00 UTC−03:00

Nacional	2–1	Princesa do Solimões
Felipe Capixaba 53'; Eder 64'		Nando 35'

Referee: Antonio Carlos Frutuoso

May 11, 2014
17:00 UTC−03:00

Princesa do Solimões	0–2	Nacional
		Felipe Capixaba 24'; Éder 37'

Arena da Amazônia, Manaus
Referee: Edmar Campos da Encarnação

== Championship finals ==
May 17, 2014
17:00 UTC−03:00

Nacional	0–2	Princesa do Solimões
		Nando 60'; Brando 79'

Estádio Roberto Simonsen, Manaus
Attendance: 2,485
Referee: Reginaldo Vasconcelos Noronha

May 24, 2014
15:00 UTC−03:00

Princesa do Solimões	1–5	Nacional
Lídio 31'		Bruno Potiguar 4'; Léo Paraíba 42', 55'; João Douglas 82', 89'

Estádio Roberto Simonsen, Manaus
Referee: Antonio Carlos Frutuoso

== Final standings ==
Pos	Team	Pld	W	D	L	GF	GA	GD	Pts	Qualification or relegation
1	Nacional	17	10	3	4	34	18	+16	33	Qualifies to the Copa do Brasil, Série D and Copa Verde
2	Princesa do Solimões	19	11	4	4	33	21	+12	37	Qualifies to the Copa do Brasil
3	Fast Clube	13	5	6	2	27	18	+9	21	
4	Nacional Borbense	11	5	3	3	17	15	+2	18	
5	Penarol	11	3	5	3	15	15	0	14	
6	Manaus	11	3	3	5	16	21	−5	12	
7	São Raimundo-AM	9	2	2	5	9	14	−5	8	
8	Iranduba	9	2	2	5	8	1	+7	8	
9	Holanda (R)	9	1	3	5	6	11	−5	6	Relegated
10	Sul América (R)	9	1	1	7	4	22	−18	4	Relegated

Rules for classification: 1) points; 2) goal difference; 3) number of goals scored.
(R) Relegated
