= 2013 Campeonato Amazonense =

Campeonato Amazonense de Futebol
- Season: 2013
- Champions: Princesa do Solimões
- Relegated: Rio Negro; Tarumã
- Copa do Brasil: Princesa do Solimões; Nacional

The 2013 Campeonato Amazonense de Futebol was the 97th season of Amazonas' top professional football league. The competition began on February 16, and ended on May 26. Princesa do Solimões won the championship by the first time, while Rio Negro and Tarumã were relegated.

== Format ==
The tournament consists of a double round-robin format, in which all twelve teams play each other twice, with classification split in two stages. Each round counts as one stage. The four better-placed teams of each stage will face themselves in playoffs matches, and the first stage champion will face the second stage champion. If the same team win both stages, it will be considered the champion.

The bottom two teams on overall classification will be relegated.

=== Qualifications ===
The champion qualifies to 2014 Campeonato Brasileiro Série D. The champion and the runner-up qualify to the 2014 Copa do Brasil.

== Participating teams ==
Club	Home city	2012 result
Fast Clube	Manaus	2nd
Holanda	Rio Preto da Eva	7th
Iranduba	Iranduba	4th
Nacional	Manaus	1st
Penarol	Itacoatiara	3rd
Princesa do Solimões	Manacapuru	6th
Rio Negro	Manaus	8th
São Raimundo	Manaus	5th
Sul América	Manaus	1st (2nd division)
Tarumã	Manaus	2nd (2nd division)

== First stage ==
=== First round (Taça Estado do Amazonas) ===
==== Standings ====
===== Group A =====
Pos	Team	Pld	W	D	L	GF	GA	GD	Pts	Qualification
1	São Raimundo-AM (A)	4	2	2	0	5	3	+2	8	Qualifies to the Playoffs
2	Princesa do Solimões (A)	4	2	1	1	6	2	+4	7	Qualifies to the Playoffs
3	Nacional-AM	4	2	0	2	7	4	+3	6	
4	Sul América	4	1	1	2	7	12	−5	4	
5	Rio Negro	4	1	0	3	2	6	−4	3	

Rules for classification: 1) points; 2) goal difference; 3) number of goals scored.
(A) Advance to a further round

===== Group B =====
Pos	Team	Pld	W	D	L	GF	GA	GD	Pts	Qualification
1	Penarol (A)	4	3	1	0	20	4	+16	10	Qualifies to the Playoffs
2	Fast Clube (A)	4	3	0	1	8	8	0	9	Qualifies to the Playoffs
3	Holanda	4	1	1	2	7	8	−1	4	
4	Iranduba	4	1	1	2	7	13	−6	4	
5	Tarumã	4	0	1	3	5	14	−9	1	

Rules for classification: 1) points; 2) goal difference; 3) number of goals scored.
(A) Advance to a further round

==== Results ====
===== Group A =====
Home \ Away	NAC	PRI	RIO	SUA	SRA
Nacional-AM				5–2	
Princesa do Solimões	1–0				1–1
Rio Negro	0–2	1–0		1–3	
Sul América		0–4			2–2
São Raimundo-AM	1–0		1–0		

Legend: Blue = home team win; Yellow = draw; Red = away team win.

===== Group B =====
Home \ Away	FAS	HOL	IRA	PEN	TAR
Fast Clube		2–1		0–5	
Holanda			1–3		3–1
Iranduba	1–4			1–6	
Penarol		2–2			7–1
Tarumã	1–2		2–2		

Legend: Blue = home team win; Yellow = draw; Red = away team win.

==== Playoffs ====
Semifinals
Penarol	0	0	0
Princesa do Solimões	1	0	1
São Raimundo	1	1	2
Fast Clube	1	2	3

Finals
Princesa do Solimões	2	3	5
Fast Clube	0	4	4

===== Semifinals =====
====== First leg ======
March 16, 2013
15:00 UTC−03:00

Princesa do Solimões	1–0	Penarol
Marinelson 55'

Estádio Gilbertão, Manacapuru
Attendance: 3,000
Referee: João Batista Cunha de Brito

March 16, 2013
15:00 UTC−03:00

Fast Clube	1–1	Penarol
Cacau 88'		Marinho 22'

Estádio Valdizão, Manaquiri
Referee: Odson Santos da Silva

====== Second leg ======
March 23, 2013

Penarol	0–0	Princesa do Solimões

Estádio Floro de Mendonça, Itacoatiara
Attendance: 3,000
Referee: Antonio Carlos Pequeno Frutuoso

March 23, 2013

Penarol	1–2	Fast Clube
Janeilton 48' (o.g.)		Cacau 5'; Junior 21'

SESI, Manaus
Attendance: 664
Referee: João Batista Cunha

===== Finals =====
March 27, 2013
15:00 UTC−03:00

Princesa do Solimões	2–0	Fast Clube
Nando 21'; Marinelson 90'

Estádio Gilbertão, Manacapuru
Attendance: 2,314
Referee: Djalma Silva de Souza

March 30, 2013
15:00 UTC−03:00

Fast Clube	4–3	Princesa do Solimões
Tiago Brandão 4'; Junior 51', 78'; Cacau 90+3'		Rondinelly 13'; Nando 36'; Edinho Canutama 38'

Estádio Valdizão, Manaquiri
Attendance: 2,705
Referee: Antônio Carlos Pequeno Frutuoso

=== Second round (Taça Cidade de Manaus) ===
==== Standings ====
===== Group A =====
Pos	Team	Pld	W	D	L	GF	GA	GD	Pts	Qualification
1	Princesa do Solimões (A)	5	4	0	1	11	4	+7	12	Qualifies to the Playoffs
2	Nacional-AM (A)	5	3	1	1	7	2	+5	10	Qualifies to the Playoffs
3	Sul América	5	1	2	2	4	8	−4	5	
4	Rio Negro	5	1	1	3	2	8	−6	4	
5	São Raimundo-AM	5	0	2	3	6	10	−4	2	

(A) Advance to a further round

===== Group B =====
Pos	Team	Pld	W	D	L	GF	GA	GD	Pts	Qualification
1	Penarol (A)	5	3	1	1	9	5	+4	10	Qualifies to the Playoffs
2	Fast Clube (A)	5	2	3	0	6	1	+5	9	Qualifies to the Playoffs
3	Iranduba	5	2	0	3	7	6	+1	6	
4	Tarumã	5	2	0	3	6	12	−6	6	
5	Holanda	4	1	1	2	4	6	−2	4	

Rules for classification: 1) points; 2) goal difference; 3) number of goals scored.
(A) Advance to a further round

==== Results ====
Home \ Away	NAC	PRI	RIO	SUA	SRA	FAS	HOL	IRA	PEN	TAR
Nacional-AM						0–0				3–0
Princesa do Solimões								1–0	3–1	5–1
Rio Negro						0–4		0–2		
Sul América							2–2			
São Raimundo-AM						1–1	0–1		1–1	
Fast Clube		1–0		0–0						
Holanda	0–2	1–2	0–0							
Iranduba	1–2			0–1	4–2					
Penarol	1–0		2–1	4–0						
Tarumã			0–1	2–1	3–2					

Legend: Blue = home team win; Yellow = draw; Red = away team win.

==== Playoffs ====
Semifinals
Princesa do Solimões	2	1	3
Fast Clube	1	1	2
São Raimundo	0	0	0
Nacional-AM	3	4	7

Finals
Princesa do Solimões	2	0	2
Nacional-AM	4	0	4

===== Semifinals =====
====== First leg ======
May 1, 2013
15:00 UTC−03:00

Nacional-AM	3–0	Penarol
Danilo Rios 16'; Charles 46', 61'

SESI, Manaus
Attendance: 902
Referee: Héber Roberto Lopes

May 1, 2013
15:00 UTC−03:00

Fast Clube	1–2	Princesa do Solimões
Alan Kardek 90'		Marinelson 23'; Joiner 37'

Floro, Itacoatiara
Attendance: 76
Referee: João Batista Cunha de Brito

====== Second leg ======
May 4, 2013
15:00 UTC−03:00

Princesa do Solimões	1–1	Fast Clube
Joiner 5'		B.A. 80'

Estádio Gilbertão, Manacapuru
Attendance: 953
Referee: Antônio Carlos Pequeno Frutuoso

May 5, 2013
15:00 UTC−03:00

Penarol	0–4	Nacional-AM
		Felipe 35', 63', 67'; Amaral 89'

Floro, Itacoatiara
Attendance: 4,000
Referee: Francisco Carlos Nascimento

===== Finals =====
May 8, 2013
15:00 UTC−03:00

Nacional-AM	4–2	Princesa do Solimões
Charles 19'; Felipe 52'; Felipe 58'; Danilo Rios 78'		Marinelson 29'; Vinicius 63'

SESI, Manaus
Attendance: 1,781
Referee: Paulo César de Oliveira

May 11, 2013
15:00 UTC−03:00

Princesa do Solimões	0–0	Nacional-AM

Estádio Gilbertão, Manacapuru
Attendance: 2,221
Referee: Ricardo Marques Ribeiro

== Final stage ==
May 19, 2013
16:00 UTC−03:00

Nacional-AM	1–3	Princesa do Solimões
Felipe 28' (pen.)		Morisco 2' (o.g.); Toró 15'; Delciney 90+1'

SESI, Manaus
Attendance: 2,924
Referee: Marcelo de Lima Henrique

May 26, 2013
13:00 UTC−03:00

Princesa do Solimões	0–2	Nacional-AM
		Garanha 28'; Leonardo 44'
Penalties
	7-6

Estádio Gilbertão, Manacapuru
Attendance: 8,032
Referee: Wilson Seneme

Princesa do Solimões is the champion of 2013 Campeonato Amazonense

== Final standings ==
Pos	Team	Pld	W	D	L	GF	GA	GD	Pts	Relegation
1	Princesa do Solimões	20	11	4	5	36	20	+16	37	
2	Nacional-AM	16	9	2	5	28	12	+16	29	
3	Fast Clube	16	7	6	3	24	20	+4	27	
4	Penarol	14	7	3	4	30	17	+13	24	
5	Sul América	10	3	3	4	11	20	−9	12	
6	São Raimundo-AM	12	2	6	4	14	17	−3	12	
7	Iranduba	10	3	1	6	14	20	−6	10	
8	Holanda	10	2	4	4	11	14	−3	10	
9	Rio Negro (R)	10	2	2	6	4	14	−10	8	Relegated
10	Tarumã (R)	10	2	1	7	12	31	−19	7	Relegated

Rules for classification: 1) points; 2) goal difference; 3) number of goals scored.
(R) Relegated
