= Delmo (footballer) =

Brazilian footballer (born 1973)

Personal information
- Full name: Delmo Arcângelo Coelho Monteiro
- Date of birth: 28 March 1973 (age 53)
- Place of birth: Parintins, Brazil
- Position: Striker

Senior career*
Years	Team	Apps	(Gls)
1995	São Raimundo		
1996–1997	Nacional de Manaus		
1997–1998	Rio Negro		
1998–2005	São Raimundo		
2005	Nacional de Manaus		
2006	São Raimundo		
2007	Fast Clube		
2008	São Raimundo		
2009	Manaus Compensão		
2009–2010	São Raimundo		

Managerial career
- 2012: São Raimundo
- * Club domestic league appearances and goals

Delmo Arcângelo Coelho Monteiro commonly known as Delmo (born 28 March 1973) is a Brazilian former footballer who played as a striker and scored more than 200 official goals for Amazonas state side São Raimundo.

== Career ==
Born in Parintins, Delmo began playing football with local side São Raimundo in the Campeonato Amazonense. He spent most of his career with the club, winning the Copa Norte and Campeonato Amazonense three times each. He also helped São Raimundo qualify for the Campeonato Brasileiro Série B in 1999. Delmo scored goals for São Raimundo in Série B during 2002, 2003, 2004, 2005 and 2006. Delmo holds the record for most goals scored in the Campeonato Amazonense with 24 during the 2004 season.

Delmo also played club football with Amazonas sides Nacional Futebol Clube, Atlético Rio Negro Clube, Nacional Fast Clube and Manaus Compensão Esporte Clube.

After he retired from playing, Delmo became a coach. He was the assistant manager to Sérgio Duarte at São Raimundo and became interim manager following his dismissal in February 2012.

== Honours ==
Nacional

- Campeonato Amazonense: 1996

São Raimundo

- Copa Norte: 1999, 2000, 2001
- Campeonato Amazonense: 2004, 2006
