= Cleyton Amaral =

Brazilian footballer (born 1989)

Personal information
- Full name: Cleyton da Silva Reis
- Date of birth: 6 January 1989 (age 37)
- Place of birth: Belém, Brazil
- Position: Forward

Team information
- Current team: Castanhal

Senior career*
Years	Team	Apps	(Gls)
2008–2009	São Raimundo–PA		
2010	América–AM	14	(0)
2011	Nacional–AM	4	(0)
2011	ABC	0	(0)
2013	São Raimundo–AM	0	(0)
2013	Atlético Tubarão	0	(0)
2014–2016	Princesa do Solimões	14	(0)
2017–	Castanhal	0	(0)
- * Club domestic league appearances and goals as of 1 February 2017

Cleyton da Silva Reis (born January 6, 1989), known as Cleyton Amaral, is a Brazilian footballer who plays as midfielder for Castanhal. He already played for national competitions such as Copa do Brasil and Campeonato Brasileiro Série D.

== Career statistics ==
As of 1 February 2017

Club	Season	League			State League		Cup		Conmebol		Other		Total	
Club	Season	Division	Apps	Goals	Apps	Goals	Apps	Goals	Apps	Goals	Apps	Goals	Apps	Goals
América–AM	2010	Série D	14	0	—		2	0	—		—		16	0
Nacional–AM	2011	Série D	4	0	8	1	—		—		—		12	1
São Raimundo–AM	2013	Amazonense	—		7	0	—		—		—		7	0
Princesa do Solimões	2014	Série D	8	0	8	1	4	0	—		—		20	1
Princesa do Solimões	2015	Amazonense	—		17	0	1	0	—		2 (Note: All appearance(s) in Copa Verde)	0	20	0
Princesa do Solimões	2016	Série D	6	0	10	0	2	0	—		—		18	0
Princesa do Solimões	Subtotal		14	0	35	1	7	0	0	0	2	0	58	1
Castanhal	2017	Paraense	—		1	0	—		—		—		1	0
Career total			32	0	51	2	9	0	0	0	2	0	94	2
