= Francisco Lima =

Brazilian footballer (born 1971)

Lima
Personal information
- Full name: Francisco Govinho Lima
- Date of birth: 17 April 1971 (age 55)
- Place of birth: Manaus, Brazil
- Height: 1.80 m (5 ft 11 in)
- Position: Midfielder

Senior career*
Years	Team	Apps	(Gls)
1990–1994	Ferroviário (CE)		
1993	→ Sul América (loan)		
1994–1996	São Paulo		
1995	→ União São João (loan)		
1996	→ Nacional (AM) (loan)		
1996–1998	Gaziantepspor	59	(3)
1998–1999	Zürich	32	(6)
1999–2000	Lecce	32	(1)
2000–2001	Bologna	29	(0)
2001–2004	Roma	88	(0)
2004–2006	Lokomotiv Moscow	41	(0)
2006	→ Qatar SC (loan)	8	(0)
2006	Dynamo Moscow	7	(0)
2007–2008	Brescia	56	(3)
2008	San Jose Earthquakes	14	(0)
2009	Taranto	12	(0)
2010	Nacional (AM)		
2010	Rio Negro (AM)		
2011	São Raimundo (AM)		
2016	Fast Clube		
2016–2017	Otranto		
2017–2018	Atletico Aradeo		
Total		360	(13)
- * Club domestic league appearances and goals

Francisco Govinho Lima (born 17 April 1971) is a Brazilian former professional footballer who played as a midfielder. Lima generally played as a defensive or central midfielder but on several occasions he was also employed as a left midfielder.

== Career ==
Lima played for São Paulo in 1996, and played for Gaziantepspor between 1996 and 1998. He then played for Zürich between 1998 and 2000, and joined Serie A team Lecce during 1999–2000. One year later, he transferred to Bologna, and impressed Roma enough to win a move to them in 2001. Roma paid Bologna 13 billion Italian lire. He signed a three-year contract and earned an average of 3.7 billion lire annually before tax.

He stayed in the capital for three seasons. At the age of 33, he went northward to Lokomotiv Moscow. In January 2006, he was loaned to Qatar SC, until the summer. He signed for Dynamo Moscow in a free transfer during the second half of the Russian season.

He then joined Brescia in January 2007, and later the San Jose Earthquakes in July 2008. However, he left them in January 2009 to move back to Italy to join Taranto.

In January 2010, Lima returned to Brazil for Nacional (AM). In the same year he played for Rio Negro (AM), another club based on his hometown. He last played for São Raimundo (AM), another Manaus based club before retiring at the age of 40. He worked as director of football at Nacional (AM) before coming out of retirement and signing for Fast Clube to play the 2016 Copa Verde as a centre back with 2006 FIFA Club World Cup winner Ediglê.

After retirement from playing, Lima moved to Boston and opened a soccer school.

== Honours ==
Ferroviário (CE)

- Campeonato Cearense: 1994

Roma

- Supercoppa Italiana: 2001
