= Campeonato Amazonense de Futebol Feminino =

Women's football league in Amazonas, Brazil

- Founded: 1984
- Country: Brazil
- Confederation: FAF
- Promotion to: Brasileiro Série A3
- Current champions: 3B da Amazônia (5th title) (2025)
- Most championships: Iranduba (8 titles)
- Current: 2025

The Campeonato Amazonense de Futebol Feminino is the women's football state championship of Amazonas state, and is contested since 1984.

== List of champions ==
Following is the list with all recognized titles of Campeonato Amazonense Feminino:

| Season | Champions | Runners-up |
|---|---|---|
| 1984 | Sul América (1) | Fast Clube |
| 1985 | Libermorro (1) | |
| 1986 | Sul América (2) | Fast Clube |
| 1987–2006 | Not held | |
| 2007 | Rio Negro (1) | Nacional |
| 2008 | Nilton Lins (1) | |
| 2009 | Nilton Lins (2) | Mundo Novo |
| 2010 | São Raimundo (1) | Esquina das Tintas |
| 2011 | Iranduba (1) | Liga Itacoatiarense |
| 2012 | Iranduba (2) | Liga Itacoatiarense |
| 2013 | Iranduba (3) | Princesa do Solimões |
| 2014 | Iranduba (4) | Princesa do Solimões |
| 2015 | Iranduba (5) | Sul América |
| 2016 | Iranduba (6) | Manaus |
| 2017 | Iranduba (7) | 3B da Amazônia |
| 2018 | Iranduba (8) | 3B da Amazônia |
| 2019 | 3B da Amazônia (1) | Iranduba |
| 2020 | JC (1) | Recanto |
| 2021 | 3B da Amazônia (2) | JC |
| 2022 | Recanto (1) | 3B da Amazônia |
| 2023 | 3B da Amazônia (3) | JC |
| 2024 | 3B da Amazônia (4) | Tarumã |
| 2025 | 3B da Amazônia (5) | Penarol |

== Titles by team ==
Teams in bold stills active.

| Rank | Club | Winners | Winning years |
|---|---|---|---|
| 1 | **Iranduba** | 8 | 2011, 2012, 2013, 2014, 2015, 2016, 2017, 2018 |
| 2 | **3B da Amazônia** | 5 | 2019, 2021, 2023, 2024, 2025 |
| 3 | Nilton Lins | 2 | 2008, 2009 |
| 3 | **Sul América** | 2 | 1984, 1986 |
| 5 | **JC** | 1 | 2020 |
| 5 | Libermorro | 1 | 1985 |
| 5 | **Recanto** | 1 | 2022 |
| 5 | **Rio Negro** | 1 | 2007 |
| 5 | **São Raimundo** | 1 | 2010 |

=== By city ===
| City | Championships | Clubs |
|---|---|---|
| Manaus | 13 | 3B da Amazônia (5), Nilton Lins (2), Sul América (2), Recanto (1), Rio Negro (1), São Raimundo (1), Libermorro |
| Iranduba | 8 | Iranduba (8) |
| Itacoatiara | 1 | JC (1) |
