= Michell Parintins =

Brazilian footballer

Personal information
- Full name: Michell Carvalho Machado
- Date of birth: 1 September 1981 (age 45)
- Place of birth: Parintins, Brazil
- Position: Midfielder

Team information
- Current team: Princesa do Solimões

Senior career*
Years	Team	Apps	(Gls)
2005	Grêmio Coariense		
2006–2008	Fast Clube		
2008–2009	São Raimundo–PA		
2009	Paysandu	4	(1)
2010	São Raimundo–PA	5	(1)
2010	Icasa	10	(0)
2011	Fast Clube		
2011	Águia de Marabá		
2012	Fast Clube		
2012	Paragominas		
2013	Fast Clube		
2013	Nacional–AM	3	(0)
2013	São Raimundo–PA		
2014	Princesa do Solimões	10	(3)
2015	Fast Clube		
2016–	Princesa do Solimões	9	(3)
- * Club domestic league appearances and goals as of 1 February 2017

Michell Carvalho Machado (born September 1, 1981 in Parintins), known as Michell Parintins, is a Brazilian footballer who plays as midfielder for Princesa do Solimões. He already played for national competitions such as Copa do Brasil, Campeonato Brasileiro Série B, Campeonato Brasileiro Série C and Campeonato Brasileiro Série D.

== Career statistics ==
As of 1 February 2017

Club	Season	League			State League		Cup		Conmebol		Other		Total	
Club	Season	Division	Apps	Goals	Apps	Goals	Apps	Goals	Apps	Goals	Apps	Goals	Apps	Goals
Paysandu	2009	Série C	4	1	—		—		—		—		4	1
São Raimundo–PA	2010	Série C	5	1	—		2	0	—		—		7	1
Icasa	2010	Série B	10	0	—		—		—		—		10	0
Fast Clube	2011	Amazonense	—		—		1	0	—		—		1	0
Fast Clube	2013	Amazonense	—		—		2	0	—		—		2	0
Fast Clube	Subtotal		—		—		3	0	—		—		3	0
Nacional–AM	2013	Série D	3	0	—		—		—		—		3	0
Princesa do Solimões	2014	Série D	10	3	17	11	4	2	—		3 (Note: All appearance(s) in Copa Verde)	2	34	18
Fast Clube	2015	Amazonense	—		15	6	—		—		—		15	6
Princesa do Solimões	2016	Série D	9	3	10	1	2	1	—		—		21	5
Career total			41	8	42	18	11	3	0	0	3	2	97	31
