= Luiz Carlos Winck =

Brazilian footballer

Luís Carlos Winck
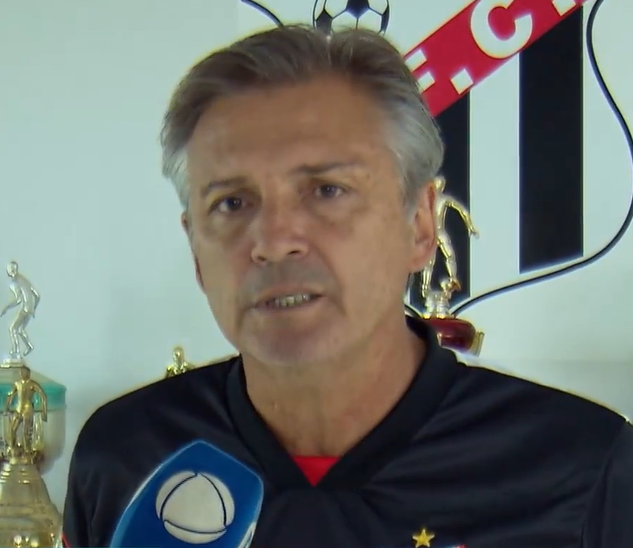
- Winck in 2024

Personal information
- Full name: Luís Carlos Coelho Winck
- Date of birth: 5 January 1963 (age 63)
- Place of birth: Portão, Brazil
- Position: Right back

Senior career*
Years	Team	Apps	(Gls)
1981–1989	Internacional		
1989–1990	Vasco da Gama		
1991	Internacional		
1992	Vasco da Gama		
1993	Grêmio		
1993	Corinthians		
1994	Internacional		
1994	Atlético Mineiro		
1995	Botafogo		
1995	Flamengo		
1996	São José-RS		

International career
1985–1993	Brazil	19	(2)

Managerial career
- 2005: Grêmio Coariense
- 2007: Sampaio Corrêa
- 2007: Bacabal
- 2008: River
- 2008: Bacabal
- 2008: São Raimundo-AM
- 2009: 15 de Novembro
- 2009–2010: Cianorte
- 2010: São José-RS
- 2011: Inter de Santa Maria
- 2011: Nacional-AM
- 2012–2013: Esportivo
- 2013: Passo Fundo
- 2014–2015: Lajeadense
- 2016: Pelotas
- 2016–2017: Caxias
- 2017: Criciúma
- 2018: Caxias
- 2018–2019: Juventude
- 2020: Pelotas
- 2021: Esportivo
- 2021–2022: Anápolis
- 2022: Glória
- 2023: Anápolis
- 2023: Itumbiara
- 2023: Centro Oeste
- 2024: Anápolis
- 2024–2025: Brasiliense
- 2025: Manauara
- 2026: Brasiliense
Medal record
Men's football
Representing Brazil
Olympic Games
Silver medal – second place	1984 Los Angeles	Team competition
Silver medal – second place	1988 Seoul	Team competition
- * Club domestic league appearances and goals

Luís Carlos Coelho Winck (born 5 January 1963) is a Brazilian football coach and former player who played as a right back.

== Club career ==
Winck his successful career in football as a defensive midfielder with Internacional, moving to the right-back position in 1984 under late coach, Ênio Andrade. Having changed his position, Winck quickly improved his performance, winning the most important award in Brazil run by sports magazine Placar (Bola de Prata) as the best player in his position that year (he would conquer the prize again in 1987).

In 1996, he retired while playing in São José-RS. Then he became coach, for teams such as São José itself, Grêmio Coariense, São Raimundo-AM and Sampaio Correa. He is currently with River Atlético Clube.

== International career ==
Luís Carlos Winck, along with midfielder Ademir Kaefer, is the only Brazilian soccer player to get two silver medals in the Olympic Games (1984 and 1988). As well as his involvement at the Olympics, Luís Carlos Winck also appeared for the Brazilian senior national team on 19 occasions, between April 1985 to June 1993, but was never called up to a World Cup. He was selected for the Copa América in 1993. He scored twice for his country, once against Mexico in 1988, and once against the United States in 1993.

== Honours ==
=== Player ===
Internacional

- Campeonato Gaúcho (4): 1981, 1982, 1984, 1991

Vasco da Gama

- Campeonato Brasileiro (1): 1989

Grêmio

- Campeonato Gaúcho (1): 1993

Brazil

- Olympic Silver Medal: 1984, 1988
