= 2001 Copa Norte =

5th edition of a Brazilian association football competition

Tournament details
- Country: Brazil
- Dates: 17 February – 18 March
- Teams: 10

Final positions
- Champions: (Amazonas (Brazilian state)) São Raimundo (3rd title)
- Runners-up: (Pará) Paysandu

Tournament statistics
- Matches played: 30
- Goals scored: 76 (2.53 per match)
- Top goal scorer(s): (Brazil) Babá (Brazil) Delmo (Brazil) Edil (Brazil) Marcelo Cabeção (5 goals each)

The 2001 Copa Norte was the fifth edition of a football competition held in Brazil. Featuring 10 clubs, Amazonas and Maranhão have two vacancies; Acre, Amapá, Pará, Piauí, Rondônia and Roraima with one each.

In the finals, São Raimundo drew Paysandu 1–1 on aggregate, but won the title for having made the best campaign. São Raimundo won your third title and earn the right to play in the 2001 Copa dos Campeões.

== Qualified teams ==
| Association | Team | Qualification method |
|---|---|---|
| (Acre (state)) Acre; 1 berth | Rio Branco | 2000 Campeonato Acreano champions |
| (Amapá) Amapá; 1 berth | Mazagão | 2000 Campeonato Amapaense runners-up |
| (Amazonas (Brazilian state)) Amazonas; 2 berths | Nacional | 2000 Campeonato Amazonense champions |
| (Amazonas (Brazilian state)) Amazonas; 2 berths | São Raimundo | 2000 Campeonato Amazonense runners-up |
| (Maranhão) Maranhão; 2 berths | Moto Club | 2000 Campeonato Maranhense champions |
| (Maranhão) Maranhão; 2 berths | Maranhão | 2000 Campeonato Maranhense 3rd place |
| (Pará) Pará; 1 berth | Paysandu | 2000 Campeonato Paraense champions |
| (Piauí) Piauí; 1 berth | River | 2000 Campeonato Piauiense champions |
| (Rondônia) Rondônia; 1 berth | Genus | 2000 Campeonato Rondoniense runners-up |
| (Roraima) Roraima; 1 berth | Atlético Roraima | 2000 Campeonato Roraimense runners-up |

== Group stage ==
=== Group A ===
| Pos | Team | Pld | W | D | L | GF | GA | GD | Pts | Qualification |
|---|---|---|---|---|---|---|---|---|---|---|
| 1 | (Amazonas (Brazilian state)) São Raimundo (A) | 6 | 4 | 2 | 0 | 11 | 3 | +8 | 14 | Advance to Knockout stage |
| 2 | (Rondônia) Genus (A) | 6 | 3 | 2 | 1 | 9 | 7 | +2 | 11 | Advance to Knockout stage |
| 3 | (Acre (state)) Rio Branco | 6 | 1 | 2 | 3 | 5 | 8 | −3 | 5 | |
| 4 | Atlético Roraima | 6 | 1 | 0 | 5 | 3 | 10 | −7 | 3 | |

Source: Bola na Área
(A) Advance to a further round

=== Group B ===
| Pos | Team | Pld | W | D | L | GF | GA | GD | Pts | Qualification |
|---|---|---|---|---|---|---|---|---|---|---|
| 1 | (Pará) Paysandu (A) | 4 | 3 | 0 | 1 | 11 | 4 | +7 | 9 | Advance to Knockout stage |
| 2 | (Amazonas (Brazilian state)) Nacional | 4 | 1 | 1 | 2 | 5 | 6 | −1 | 4 | |
| 3 | (Maranhão) Moto Club | 4 | 1 | 1 | 2 | 2 | 8 | −6 | 4 | |

Source: Bola na Área
(A) Advance to a further round

=== Group C ===
| Pos | Team | Pld | W | D | L | GF | GA | GD | Pts | Qualification |
|---|---|---|---|---|---|---|---|---|---|---|
| 1 | (Piauí) River (A) | 4 | 2 | 1 | 1 | 4 | 3 | +1 | 7 | Advance to Knockout stage |
| 2 | (Amapá) Mazagão | 4 | 1 | 2 | 1 | 7 | 7 | 0 | 5 | |
| 3 | Maranhão | 4 | 0 | 3 | 1 | 4 | 5 | −1 | 3 | |

Source: Bola na Área
(A) Advance to a further round

== Bracket ==
Semi-finals
(Piauí) River | 2 | 0 | 2
(Pará) Paysandu | 2 | 2 | 4
(Rondônia) Genus | 0 | 0 | 0
(Amazonas (Brazilian state)) São Raimundo | 3 | 4 | 7

Finals
(Pará) Paysandu | 1 | 0 | 1
(Amazonas (Brazilian state)) São Raimundo | 0 | 1 | 1

== Finals ==
11 March 2001
17:00 UTC−3

| Paysandu (Pará) | 1–0 | (Amazonas (Brazilian state)) São Raimundo |
|---|---|---|
| Edil 86' | Report |

Estádio da Curuzu, Belém
Attendance: 8,900
Referee: Jamir Carlos Garcez

18 March 2001
18:00 UTC−3

| São Raimundo (Amazonas (Brazilian state)) | 1–0 | (Pará) Paysandu |
|---|---|---|
| Alberto 87' | Report |

Vivaldão, Manaus
Attendance: 21,835
Referee: Alfredo Loebeling

Tied 1–1 on aggregate. São Raimundo won for having made the best campaign.
