= 2000 Copa Norte =

4th edition of a Brazilian association football competition

Tournament details
- Country: Brazil
- Dates: 6 January – 1 March
- Teams: 11

Final positions
- Champions: (Amazonas (Brazilian state)) São Raimundo (2nd title)
- Runners-up: Maranhão

Tournament statistics
- Matches played: 30
- Goals scored: 77 (2.57 per match)
- Top goal scorer(s): (Brazil) Paulo César (Brazil) Robenildo (5 goals each)

The 2000 Copa Norte was the fourth edition of a football competition held in Brazil. Featuring 11 clubs, Pará have four vacancies; Acre, Amapá, Amazonas, Maranhão, Piauí, Rondônia and Roraima with one each.

In the finals, São Raimundo defeated Maranhão 4–3 on aggregate to win their second title and earn the right to play in the 2000 Copa dos Campeões.

== Qualified teams ==
| Association | Team | Qualification method |
|---|---|---|
| (Acre (state)) Acre; 1 berth | Vasco de Rio Branco | 1999 Campeonato Acreano champions |
| (Amapá) Amapá; 1 berth | Aliança | 1999 Campeonato Amapaense runners-up |
| (Amazonas (Brazilian state)) Amazonas; 1 berth | São Raimundo | 1999 Campeonato Amazonense champions |
| (Maranhão) Maranhão; 1 berth | Maranhão | 1999 Campeonato Maranhense champions |
| (Pará) Pará; 4 berths | Remo | 1999 Campeonato Paraense champions |
| (Pará) Pará; 4 berths | Paysandu | 1999 Campeonato Paraense runners-up |
| (Pará) Pará; 4 berths | Castanhal | 1999 Campeonato Paraense 3rd place |
| (Pará) Pará; 4 berths | Tuna Luso | 1999 Campeonato Paraense 4th place |
| (Piauí) Piauí; 1 berth | River | 1999 Campeonato Piauiense champions |
| (Rondônia) Rondônia; 1 berth | Genus | 1999 Campeonato Rondoniense 3rd place |
| (Roraima) Roraima; 1 berth | Rio Negro | 1999 Campeonato Roraimense runners-up |

== Preliminary round ==
| Pos | Team | Pld | W | D | L | GF | GA | GD | Pts | Qualification |
|---|---|---|---|---|---|---|---|---|---|---|
| 1 | (Pará) Remo (A) | 3 | 2 | 0 | 1 | 6 | 3 | +3 | 6 | Advance to Group stage |
| 2 | (Pará) Tuna Luso | 3 | 2 | 0 | 1 | 5 | 4 | +1 | 6 | |
| 3 | (Pará) Paysandu | 3 | 2 | 0 | 1 | 4 | 3 | +1 | 6 | |
| 4 | (Pará) Castanhal | 3 | 0 | 0 | 3 | 3 | 5 | −2 | 0 | |

Source: Bola na Área
(A) Advance to a further round

== Group stage ==
=== Group A ===
| Pos | Team | Pld | W | D | L | GF | GA | GD | Pts | Qualification |
|---|---|---|---|---|---|---|---|---|---|---|
| 1 | (Amazonas (Brazilian state)) São Raimundo (A) | 6 | 4 | 2 | 0 | 12 | 5 | +7 | 14 | Advance to Knockout stage |
| 2 | (Pará) Remo (A) | 6 | 2 | 3 | 1 | 9 | 6 | +3 | 9 | Advance to Knockout stage |
| 3 | (Acre (state)) Vasco de Rio Branco | 6 | 2 | 1 | 3 | 3 | 7 | −4 | 7 | |
| 4 | (Rondônia) Genus | 6 | 1 | 0 | 5 | 3 | 9 | −6 | 3 | |

Source: Bola na Área
(A) Advance to a further round

=== Group B ===
| Pos | Team | Pld | W | D | L | GF | GA | GD | Pts | Qualification |
|---|---|---|---|---|---|---|---|---|---|---|
| 1 | Maranhão (A) | 6 | 3 | 2 | 1 | 12 | 7 | +5 | 11 | Advance to Knockout stage |
| 2 | (Piauí) River (A) | 6 | 2 | 4 | 0 | 9 | 7 | +2 | 10 | Advance to Knockout stage |
| 3 | (Roraima) Rio Negro | 6 | 2 | 1 | 3 | 8 | 7 | +1 | 7 | |
| 4 | (Amapá) Aliança | 6 | 1 | 1 | 4 | 8 | 16 | −8 | 4 | |

Source: Bola na Área
(A) Advance to a further round

== Bracket ==
Semi-finals
(Pará) Remo | 0 | 1 | 1
Maranhão | 2 | 1 | 3
(Piauí) River | 1 | 0 | 1
(Amazonas (Brazilian state)) São Raimundo | 0 | 1 | 1

Finals
Maranhão | 3 | 0 | 3
(Amazonas (Brazilian state)) São Raimundo | 2 | 2 | 4

== Finals ==
26 February 2000
16:00 UTC−3

| Maranhão | 3–2 | (Amazonas (Brazilian state)) São Raimundo |
|---|---|---|
| | Report |

Estádio Nhozinho Santos, São Luís

1 March 2000
21:40 UTC−3

| São Raimundo (Amazonas (Brazilian state)) | 2–0 | Maranhão |
|---|---|---|
| Delmo; Marcelo Araxá | Report |

Vivaldão, Manaus

São Raimundo won 4–3 on aggregate.
