= Wellington Fajardo =

Brazilian footballer and manager (born 1961)

Personal information
- Full name: Wellington Tavares Fajardo
- Date of birth: 11 June 1961 (age 65)
- Place of birth: Leopoldina, Brazil
- Position: Goalkeeper

Youth career
- América Mineiro

Senior career*
Years	Team	Apps	(Gls)
1978–1985	América Mineiro		
1986–1988	Cruzeiro	15	(0)
1989	Vila Nova		
1990	São José-SP		
1991	América-SP		

Managerial career
- 2001: Tupi
- 2001: Francana
- 2002: Sobradinho
- 2002–2003: Tupi
- 2003: Uberlândia
- 2004–2006: Democrata-GV
- 2008: Tupi
- 2009: Uberlândia
- 2012: Villa Nova
- 2012–2014: Uberlândia
- 2015: Villa Nova
- 2018: Patrocinense
- 2019: Patrocinense
- 2019–2020: Manaus
- 2021: URT
- 2021: Treze
- 2022: URT
- 2023: Nacional-AM
- 2024: Uberlândia
- 2025: Nacional-AM
- * Club domestic league appearances and goals

Wellington Tavares Fajardo (born 11 June 1961) is a Brazilian football coach and former player who played as a goalkeeper.

== Honours ==
=== Player ===
Cruzeiro

- Campeonato Mineiro: 1987

=== Manager ===
Tupi

- Campeonato Mineiro Módulo II: 2001
- Taça Minas Gerais: 2008

Manaus

- Campeonato Amazonense: 2019
