= 1999 Copa Norte =

3rd edition of a Brazilian association football competition

Tournament details
- Country: Brazil
- Dates: 24 January – 4 April
- Teams: 10

Final positions
- Champions: (Amazonas (Brazilian state)) São Raimundo (1st title)
- Runners-up: (Maranhão) Sampaio Corrêa

Tournament statistics
- Matches played: 14
- Goals scored: 48 (3.43 per match)
- Top goal scorer(s): (Brazil) Fabiano (Brazil) Neto (Brazil) Niltinho (4 goals each)

The 1999 Copa Norte was the third edition of a football competition held in Brazil. Featuring 10 clubs, Pará have three vacancies; Acre, Amapá, Amazonas, Maranhão, Piauí, Rondônia and Roraima with one each.

In the finals, São Raimundo defeated Sampaio Corrêa 3–1 on penalties after tied 2–2 on aggregate to win their first title and earn the right to play in the 1999 Copa CONMEBOL.

== Qualified teams ==
Association	Team	Qualification method
(Acre (state)) Acre; 1 berth	Independência	1998 Campeonato Acreano champions
(Amapá) Amapá; 1 berth	Independente	1998 Campeonato Amapaense 4th place
(Amazonas (Brazilian state)) Amazonas; 1 berth	São Raimundo	1998 Campeonato Amazonense champions
(Maranhão) Maranhão; 1 berth	Sampaio Corrêa	1998 Campeonato Maranhense champions
(Pará) Pará; 3 berths	Paysandu	1998 Campeonato Paraense champions
(Pará) Pará; 3 berths	Remo	1998 Campeonato Paraense runners-up
(Pará) Pará; 3 berths	Tuna Luso	1998 Campeonato Paraense 6th place
(Piauí) Piauí; 1 berth	Flamengo	1998 Campeonato Piauiense 3rd place
(Rondônia) Rondônia; 1 berth	Cruzeiro	1998 Campeonato Rondoniense runners-up
(Roraima) Roraima; 1 berth	Baré	1998 Campeonato Roraimense runners-up

== Preliminary round ==
Pos	Team	Pld	W	D	L	GF	GA	GD	Pts	Qualification
1	(Pará) Paysandu (A)	2	1	0	1	3	3	0	3	Advance to Knockout stage
2	(Pará) Remo	2	1	0	1	3	2	+1	3	
3	(Pará) Tuna Luso	2	1	0	1	2	3	−1	3	

Source: Bola na Área
(A) Advance to a further round

== Bracket ==
Quarter-finals
(Amapá) Independente	3	0	3
(Piauí) Flamengo	2	4	6
(Pará) Paysandu	0	1	1
(Maranhão) Sampaio Corrêa	2	1	3
(Amazonas (Brazilian state)) São Raimundo (p)	0	1	1 (5)
(Roraima) Baré	0	1	1 (4)
(Acre (state)) Independência	1	2	3
(Rondônia) Cruzeiro	3	2	5

Semi-finals
(Piauí) Flamengo	2	0	2
(Maranhão) Sampaio Corrêa	4	4	8
(Amazonas (Brazilian state)) São Raimundo	8	2	10
(Rondônia) Cruzeiro	0	1	1

Finals
(Maranhão) Sampaio Corrêa	0	2	2 (1)
(Amazonas (Brazilian state)) São Raimundo (p)	1	1	2 (3)

== Finals ==
28 March 1999

Sampaio Corrêa (Maranhão)	0–1	(Amazonas (Brazilian state)) São Raimundo
	Report	Luíca

Estádio Nhozinho Santos, São Luís

4 April 1999

São Raimundo (Amazonas (Brazilian state))	1–2	(Maranhão) Sampaio Corrêa
Neto 60'	Report	Jairo Lenzi 20'; Valdson 73'
Penalties
	3–1

Vivaldão, Manaus
Attendance: 47,211
Referee: Jamir Garcez

Tied 2–2 on aggregate, São Raimundo won on penalties.
