= Amadeu Teixeira =

Brazilian football manager (1926–2017)

Personal information
- Date of birth: 30 June 1926
- Place of birth: Amazonas, Brazil
- Date of death: 7 November 2017 (aged 91)
- Place of death: Manaus, Amazonas, Brazil

Managerial career
- Years: Team
- 1955–2008: América-AM

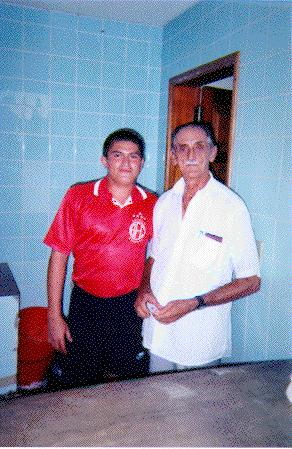

Amadeu Teixeira Alves (30 June 1926 – 7 November 2017) was a Brazilian football player and manager who coached the now defunct club América de Manaus from 1955 until 2008, for 54 consecutive seasons. He holds the world record for the longest-serving manager of all time. The Amadeu Teixeira Arena in Manaus, opened in 2006 and used for futsal, was named after him.

== Honours ==
América-AM

- Campeonato Amazonense: 1994
- Torneio Início Amazonense: 1965, 1986, 1996
- Campeonato Amazonense Second Division: 1960, 1962

== See also ==
- List of world association football records
