= Associação Atlética Rodoviária =

Rodoviária
- Full name: Associação Atlética Rodoviária
- Nickname(s): Time dos Rodoviários
- Founded: January 20, 1960
- Dissolved: 1976
- Ground: Parque Amazonense, Manaus, Brazil
- Capacity: 10,000
Home colours	Away colours	Third colours

Associação Atlética Rodoviária, commonly known as Rodoviária, were a Brazilian football team from Manaus, Amazonas state. They won the Campeonato Amazonense in 1973, and competed in the Série B in 1971.

== History ==
Associação Atlética Rodoviária were founded on January 20, 1960, by employees of the Departamento de Rodagens of the city of Manaus (Manaus city Highway Department). They finished as the 1971 Campeonato Amazonense runners-up, after being defeated in the final by Fast Clube. Rodoviária competed in the Série B in 1971, when they were eliminated by Remo in the Second Stage of the competition. The club won the Campeonato Amazonense in 1973, after beating Rio Negro in the final. Rodoviária folded in 1976.

== Stadium ==
Rodoviária played their home games at Estádio Parque Amazonense. The stadium had a maximum capacity of 10,000 people, and it was demolished in 1976.

== Honours ==
- Campeonato Amazonense
  - Winners (1): 1973
- Copa Amazonas
  - Winners (1): 1973
- Taça Cidade de Manaus
  - Winners (1): 1971
- Torneio Início do Amazonas
  - Winners (2): 1971, 1976
