= Esporte Clube Tarumã =

Tarumã
- Full name: Esporte Clube Tarumã
- Nickname(s): Lobo do Norte (Northern Wolf)
- Founded: March 3, 1974
- President: Antônio Policarpo Rios
- Head coach: Leandro Ávila
Home colors	Away colors

Esporte Clube Tarumã, commonly known as Tarumã, is a football (soccer) club from Manaus, Amazonas, Brazil. They competed in the Campeonato Amazonense once.

== History ==
The club was founded in 1974 at 14 de Janeiro neighborhood, in Tarumã Avenue, Manaus, hence the club's name. Tarumã competed in the Campeonato Amazonense Second Level in 2008, finishing in the fifth place, and in 2010, finishing in the second to last position. They competed in the Campeonato Amazonense in 2013, but after a bad performance, Tarumã was relegated to the Second Level.
