= Libermorro Futebol Clube =

Libermorro
- Full name: Libermorro Futebol Clube
- Nickname(s): Tigrão do Morro; Lili
- Founded: December 7, 1947
- Ground: SESI, Manaus, Amazonas state, Brazil
- Capacity: 5,000
| Home colors | Away colors |

Libermorro Futebol Clube, commonly known as Libermorro, is a Brazilian football club based in Manaus, Amazonas.

== History ==
The club was founded on December 7, 1947. They won the Torneio Início in 1984.

== Honours ==
=== Women's Football ===
- Campeonato Amazonense de Futebol Feminino
  - Winners (1): 1985

== Stadium ==
Libermorro Futebol Clube play their home games at Estádio Roberto Simonsen, commonly known as SESI. The stadium has a maximum capacity of 5,000 people. Until July 2010, the club played their home games at Vivaldão. Vivaldão had a maximum capacity of 31,000 people.
