= Cruzeiro do Sul F.C. =

Brazilian former association football club

Cruzeiro do Sul
- Full name: Cruzeiro do Sul Foot-Ball Club
- Founded: 1 October 1926; 99 years ago
Home colours	Away colours	Third colours

The Cruzeiro do Sul Foot-Ball Club was a Brazilian association football club based in the city of Manaus, in the state of Amazonas.

== History ==
Cruzeiro do Sul was founded on October 1, 1926. Its shield was represented by Cruzeiro do Sul in blue. The team competed in the Campeonato Amazonense of 1928, 1929, 1930, 1931, 1933 and 1934, this being their last participation in the competition. He managed to become champion in his first participation, one of the few clubs in Amazonense football to achieve this feat.

== Honours ==
- Campeonato Amazonense
  - Winners (2): 1928, 1930

== See also ==
- Campeonato Amazonense
