= Leandro Ávila =

Brazilian footballer

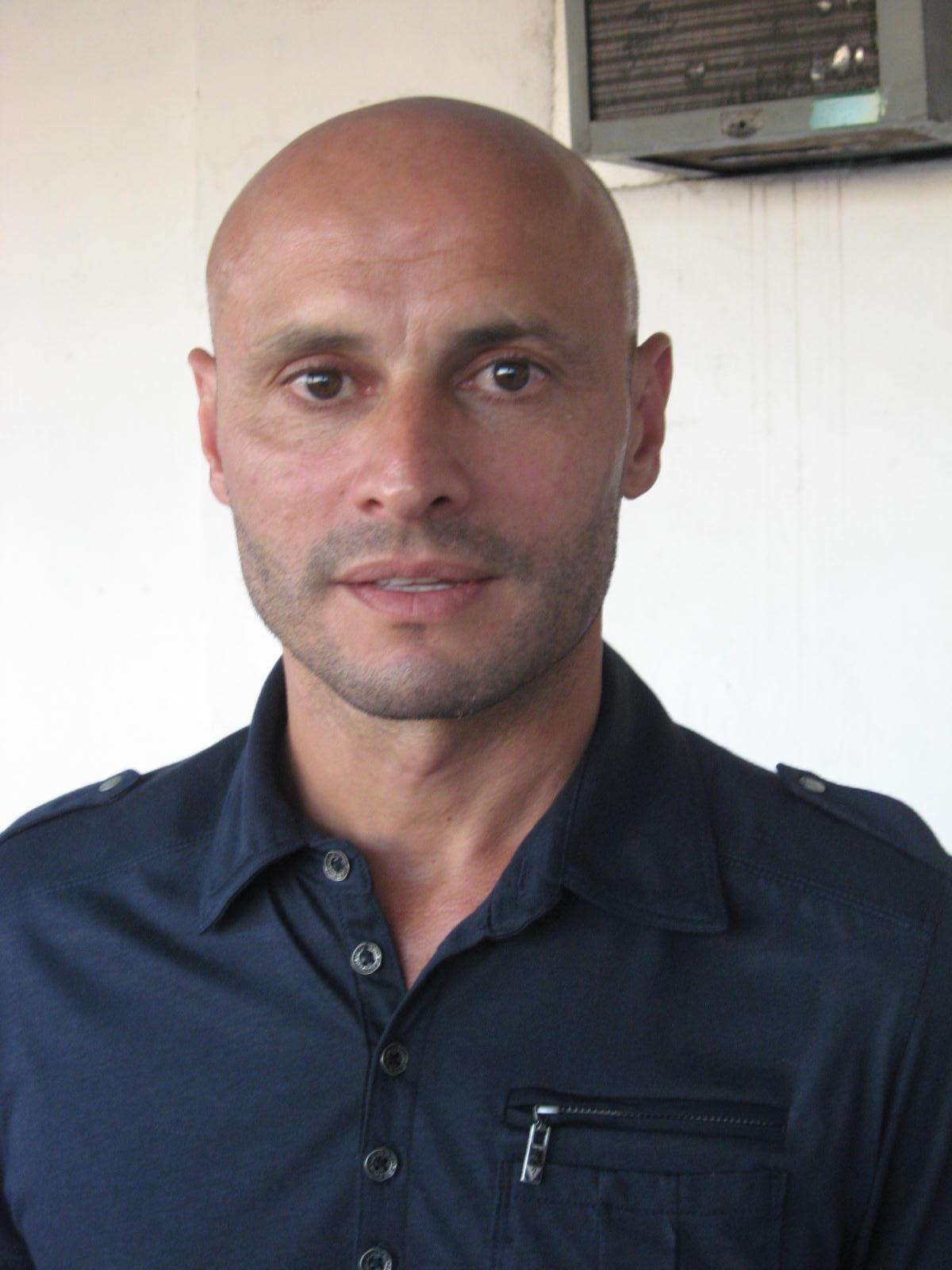
- Ávila in 2011

Personal information
- Full name: Leandro Corona Ávila
- Date of birth: 6 April 1971 (age 55)
- Place of birth: Porto Alegre, Brazil
- Height: 1.77 m (5 ft 9 1/2 in)
- Position: Defensive midfielder

Youth career
- 1988–1990: Vasco da Gama

Senior career*
| Years | Team | Apps | (Gls) |
| 1991–1995 | Vasco da Gama | 35 | (0) |
| 1995 | Botafogo | 19 | (0) |
| 1996 | Internacional | ? | (?) |
| 1996–1997 | Palmeiras | 18 | (0) |
| 1997–1998 | Fluminense | 16 | (0) |
| 1998–2001 | Flamengo | 46 | (0) |
| 2001 | → Botafogo (loan) | 18 | (0) |
| 2002 | Internacional | ? | (?) |
| 2003 | Al Hilal | ? | (?) |
| 2004 | Marília | ? | (?) |
| 2004 | Serrano | ? | (?) |
| Total | | ? | (?) |

International career
| 1995–1997 | Brazil | 8 | (0) |

Managerial career
- 2007: CFZ do Rio
- 2011: Torreense
- 2014: Atlético Paranaense (assistant-interim)
- 2017–: Tarumã
- * Club domestic league appearances and goals

Leandro Corona Ávila (born 6 April 1971) is a Brazilian former professional footballer who played at both club and international levels as a defensive midfielder.
