= Manaos Athletic Club =

Manaos
- Full name: Manaos Athletic Club
- Nickname(s): Time Inglês; Azuis
- Founded: Juny 23, 1908
- Ground: Estádio Parque Amazonense, Manaus, Amazonas state, Brazil
- Capacity: 12,000
Home colours	Away colours	Third colours

Manaos Athletic Club, commonly known as "Manaos Athletic" or "Manaos A.C.", was a Brazilian football club based in Manaus, Amazonas. They won the Campeonato Amazonense twice.

== History ==
The club was founded in 1913. They won the Campeonato Amazonense in 1914 and in 1915. The club eventually folded.

== Stadium ==
Manaos Athletic Club played their home games at Estádio Parque Amazonense. The stadium had a maximum capacity of 12,000 people.

== Achievements ==
- Campeonato Amazonense:
  - Winners (2): 1914, 1915
