= Copa Amazonas =

- Organising body: Federação Amazonense de Futebol
- Founded: 1954
- Abolished: 2016
- Region: Amazonas, Brazil
- Qualifier for: Copa Verde (2015)
- Related competitions: Campeonato Amazonense
- Most successful club(s): Nacional (10 titles)

The Copa Amazonas (English: Amazonas Cup) was the association football state cup of Amazonas, organized by the Federação Amazonense de Futebol (FAF), in order to decide one of the representatives of the state at the Copa Verde.

== List of champions ==
=== As part of Campeonato Amazonense ===
Season	Champions
1954	América
1955	Fast Clube
1964	Fast Clube
1967	Olímpico
1969	Nacional
1970	Nacional
1971	Fast Clube
1972	Fast Clube
1973	Rodoviária
1974	Nacional
1975	Nacional
1975	Sul América
1976	Rio Negro
1977	Sul América
1979	Rio Negro
1980	Nacional
1981	Nacional
1982	Nacional
1982	Rio Negro
1984	Nacional
1988	Rio Negro
1999	Nacional
2000	Nacional
2002	Cliper

=== As State Cup ===
In 2015, an edition was held along the lines of other state cups throughout Brazil, held after the state championship. Fast Clube was the champion.

Season	Champions
2015	Fast Clube

== Titles by team ==
Club	Wins
Nacional	10
Fast Clube	5
Rio Negro	4
Sul América	2
América	1
Cliper	1
Rodoviária	1
Olímpico	1
