= Olímpico Clube =

Olímpico
- Full name: Olímpico Clube
- Founded: October 17, 1938
- Ground: Estádio Parque Amazonense, Manaus, Amazonas state, Brazil
- Capacity: 12,000
Home colours	Away colours

Olímpico Clube, commonly known as Olímpico, is a Brazilian football club based in Manaus, Amazonas state. They won the Campeonato Amazonense three times.

== History ==
The club was founded on October 17, 1938. Olímpico won the Campeonato Amazonense in 1944, 1947, and in 1967.

== Honours ==
- Campeonato Amazonense
  - Winners (3): 1944, 1947, 1967
  - Runners-up (2): 1943, 1946
- Copa Amazonas
  - Winners (1): 1967
- Torneio Início do Amazonas
  - Winners (2): 1942, 1947

== Stadium ==
Olímpico Clube play their home games at Estádio Parque Amazonense. The stadium has a maximum capacity of 12,000 people.
