= Atlético Clipper Clube =

Clipper
- Full name: Atlético Clipper Clube
- Nickname(s): Águia Dourada; Águia do Parque 10
- Founded: June 1, 1952
- Ground: SESI, Manaus, Amazonas state, Brazil
- Capacity: 5,000
- Website: https://www.instagram.com/atleclipper/
Home colours	Away colours

Atlético Clipper Clube, commonly known as Clipper, is a Brazilian football club based in Manaus, Amazonas.

== History ==
The club was founded on June 1, 1952. They finished in the second position in the Campeonato Amazonense in 1996 and in 2002.

== Honours ==
- Campeonato Amazonense
  - Runners-up (2): 1996, 2002
- Copa Amazonas
  - Winners (1): 2002
- Taça Cidade de Manaus
  - Winners (1): 1996

== Stadium ==
Atlético Clipper Clube play their home games at Estádio Roberto Simonsen, commonly known as SESI. The stadium has a maximum capacity of 5,000 people. Until July 2010, the club played their home games at Vivaldão. Vivaldão had a maximum capacity of 31,000 people.
