= América Futebol Clube (AM) =

América-AM
- Full name: América Futebol Clube
- Nickname(s): Mequinha; Os diabos vermelhos O clube de Amadeu; Colorado Amazonense
- Founded: 2 August 1939; 86 years ago
- Ground: SESI
- Capacity: 5,000
- League: Campeonato Brasileiro Série C Campeonato Amazonense
- 2011: Campeonato Amazonense 8th of 9
| Home colours | Away colours |

The América Futebol Clube, also referred to as América-AM or América de Manaus, was an association football club based in Manaus, the capital of the Brazilian state of Amazonas.

== History ==
The club was founded as The América Futebol Clube on August 2, 1939, by the brothers Arthur and Amadeu Teixeira Alves, and named after the Rio de Janeiro club of the same name. In the beginning, the club's only players were Dom Bosco School students.

The América won four state championships in a row from 1951 to 1954.

The América competed in 1981 in the Campeonato Brasileiro Série C, which was named Taça de Bronze (Bronze Trophy) at the time. The club was eliminated in the first stage, by the Izabelense of Pará state.

On May 14, 2010, the club name was changed to the Manaos Futebol Clube, in order to popularize it amongst the people of Amazonas. The colors were changed from red and white to green (representing the Amazon Forest) and black (representing the Rio Negro (Black River)). On June 21, 2010, the board of directors, motivated by the lack of financial investments expected with the identity change, changed the name back to the América. Later, this same board of investors founded the current Manaus Futebol Clube.

They finished as the 2010 Série D runners-up after being defeated in the final by the Guarany de Sobral. However, the club lost 6 points for fielding an ineligible player, and its spot in the 2011 Série C was awarded to the Joinville. The club closed its activities in 2012.

Amadeu Teixeira is also the longest-serving manager in history, with 53 years ahead América's head coaching.

== Honours ==
- Campeonato Amazonense
  - Winners (6): 1951, 1952, 1953, 1954, 1994, 2009
  - Runners-up (4): 1955, 1960, 1963, 1988
- Copa Amazonas
  - Winners (1): 1954
- Campeonato Amazonense Second Division
  - Winners (2): 1960, 1962
- Taça Cidade de Manaus
  - Winners (4): 1963, 1988, 1994, 2009
- Torneio Início ACLEA
  - Winners (4): 1955, 1965, 1986, 1996

== Stadium ==
The América's home stadium is Estádio Vivaldo Lima, usually known as Vivaldão, and was inaugurated in 1970 with a maximum capacity of 43,000 people.

The club also owns a training ground, named Centro Social Urbano do Parque 10 de Novembro, sometimes called CSU. The América sometimes trains at the Campo do Formigão training ground.

== Symbols ==
The club's official anthem was composed by Daniel Sales in 1998 and is named "América do meu Coração" (América of my Heart). The América's mascot is a devil named Diabo Rubro (Red Devil). The club is nicknamed Mequinha, which means Little América.
