= Centro de Desenvolvimento Comunitário Manicoré =

Manicoré
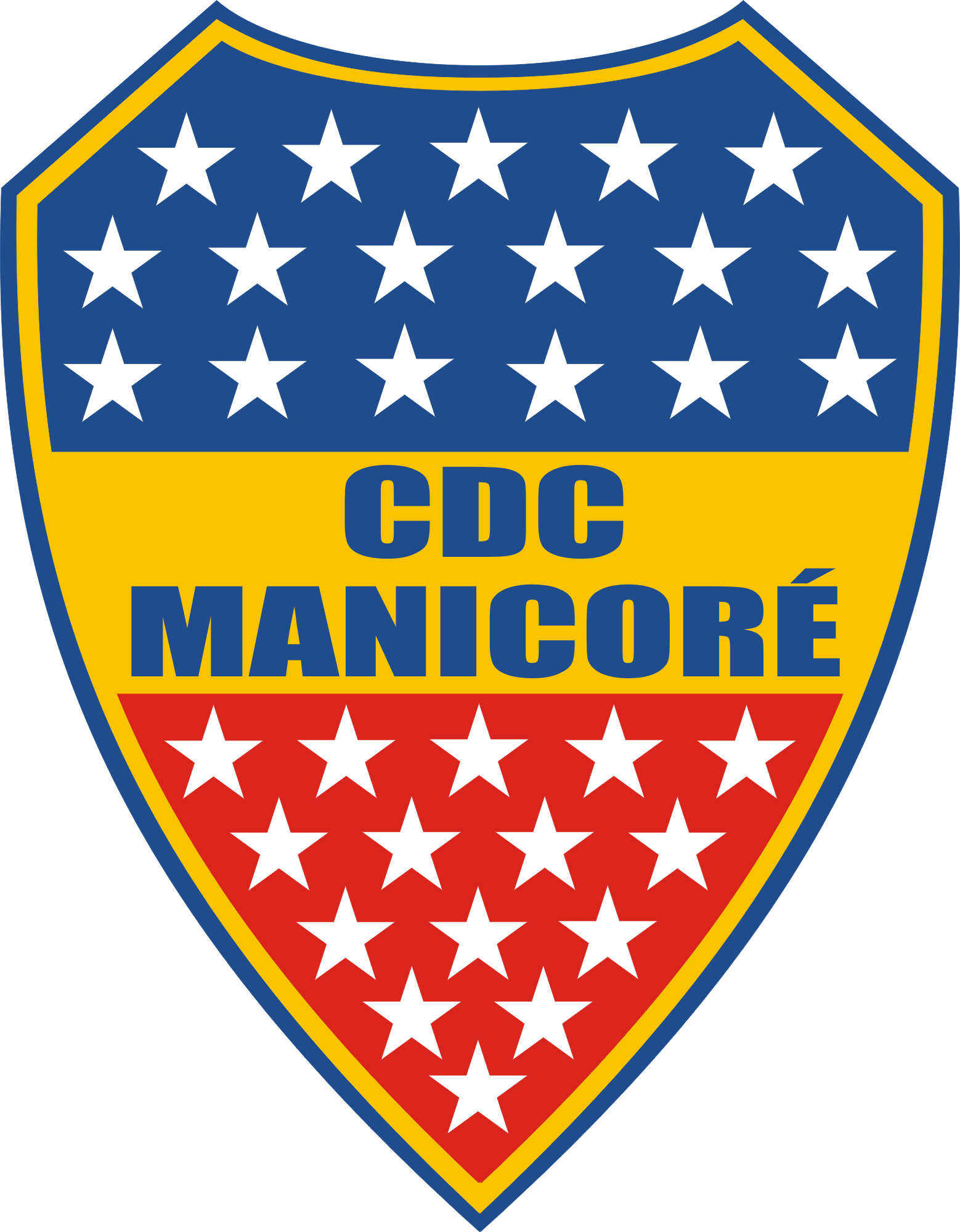
- Full name: Centro de Desenvolvimento Comunitário Manicoré
- Nickname(s): Bacurau do Madeira; Gigante do Madeira
- Founded: May 30, 2007
- Ground: Bacurauzão, Manicoré, Amazonas state, Brazil
- Capacity: 3,500
Home colours	Away colours

Centro de Desenvolvimento Comunitário Manicoré, commonly known as CDC Manicoré, is a Brazilian football club based in Manicoré, Amazonas state.

== History ==
The club was founded on May 30, 2007. They won the Campeonato Amazonense Second Level in 2011, sharing the title with Iranduba and thus being promoted to the 2012 Campeonato Amazonense.

== Achievements ==
- Campeonato Amazonense Second Level:
  - Winners (1): 2011

== Stadium ==
Centro de Desenvolvimento Comunitário Manicoré play their home games at Estádio Flávia de Oliveira, nicknamed Bacurauzão. The stadium has a maximum capacity of 3,500 people.
