= Manaus Compensão Esporte Clube =

Manaus Compensão
- Full name: Manaus Compensão Esporte Clube
- Nickname: Compensão
- Founded: August 20, 2009 (17 years ago)
- Ground: Chicão, Rio Preto da Eva, Amazonas state, Brazil
- Capacity: 8,000
Home colors	Away colors

Manaus Compensão Esporte Clube, commonly known as Manaus Compensão, or as Compensão, is a Brazilian football club based in Manaus, Amazonas.

== History ==
The club was founded on August 20, 2009, after competing for several years in the Peladão amateur competition. They won the Campeonato Amazonense Second Level in 2009.

In January 2017, a Federal Police operation discovered that the club was financed, during its first season, by the criminal faction Família do Norte, which runs drug trafficking and criminality in the state of Amazonas.

== Achievements ==
- Campeonato Amazonense Second Level:
  - Winners (1): 2009

== Stadium ==
Manaus Compensão Esporte Clube play their home games at Estádio Francisco Garcia, commonly known as Chicão, and located in Rio Preto da Eva. The stadium has a maximum capacity of 8,000 people.
