= Campeonato Amazonense Série B =

Tier of the football league of the state of Amazonas, Brazil

- Organising body: FAF
- Founded: 1914; 112 years ago
- Country: Brazil
- State: (Amazonas (Brazilian state)) Amazonas
- Level on pyramid: 2
- Promotion to: Campeonato Amazonense
- Current champions: Itacoatiara (1st title) (2025)
- Most championships: Manaos Sporting; Rio Negro (3 titles each)
- Website: FAF Official website

The Campeonato Amazonense Série B, also named Campeonato Amazonense Segunda Divisão is the second tier of the professional state football league in the Brazilian state of Amazonas. It is run by the Amazonas Football Federation (FAF).

== List of champions ==
=== Amateur era ===
Season	Champions	Runners-up
1914	Manaos Sporting (1)	Luso
1915	Manaos Sporting (2)	Rio Negro
1916	Manaos Sporting (3)	Luso
1917	Rio Negro (1)	Nacional
1918–1930	Unknown	
1931	Fast Clube (1)	Unknown
1932–1946	Unknown	
1947	Fluminense (1)	Barés
1948–1956	Unknown	
1957	Internacional (1)	Unknown
1958	Guarany (1)	Unknown
1959	Estrela do Norte (1)	Riachuelo
1960	América (1)	Estrela do Norte
1961	Labor (1)	Estrela do Norte
1962	América (2)	Unknown

=== Professional era ===
Season	Champions	Runners-up
2007	Holanda (1)	Nacional B
2008	Rio Negro (2)	Penarol
2009	Manaus Compensão (1)	ASA da Amazônia
2010	Operário (1)	Rio Negro
2011	CDC Manicoré (1)	Iranduba
2012	Not held	
2013	Manaus (1)	Nacional Borbense
2014	Operário (2)	Rio Negro
2015–2016	Not held	
2017	Holanda (Note: Penarol requested that the FAF award the title to Holanda due to the death of their president, Leão Braúna.) (2)	Penarol
2017 (E) (Note: A second edition was disputed in the 2017 season to decide what teams would play in the 2018 Amazonense, since the first edition played in the 2017 season served as a qualifying stage to the 2017 Amazonense.)	São Raimundo (1)	CDC Manicoré
2018	Iranduba (1)	Sul América
2019	Amazonas (1)	São Raimundo
2020	Clipper (1)	JC
2021	Manauara (1)	Operário
2022	Rio Negro (3)	Parintins
2023	Unidos do Alvorada (1)	São Raimundo
2024	Sete (1)	CDC Manicoré
2025	Itacoatiara (1)	Operário

== Titles by team ==
Club	Wins	Winning years
Manaos Sporting	3	1914, 1915, 1916
Rio Negro	3	1917, 2008, 2022
América	2	1960, 1962
Operário	2	2010, 2014
Holanda	2	2007, 2017
Fast Clube	1	1931
Fluminense	1	1947
Internacional	1	1957
Guarany	1	1958
Estrela do Norte	1	1959
Itacoatiara	1	2025
Labor	1	1961
Manaus Compensão	1	2009
CDC Manicoré	1	2011
Manaus	1	2013
São Raimundo	1	2017 (Extra)
Iranduba	1	2018
Amazonas FC	1	2019
Cliper	1	2020
Manauara	1	2021
Unidos do Alvorada	1	2023
Sete	1	2024
