= Arena da Amazônia =

Football stadium in Amazonas, Brazil

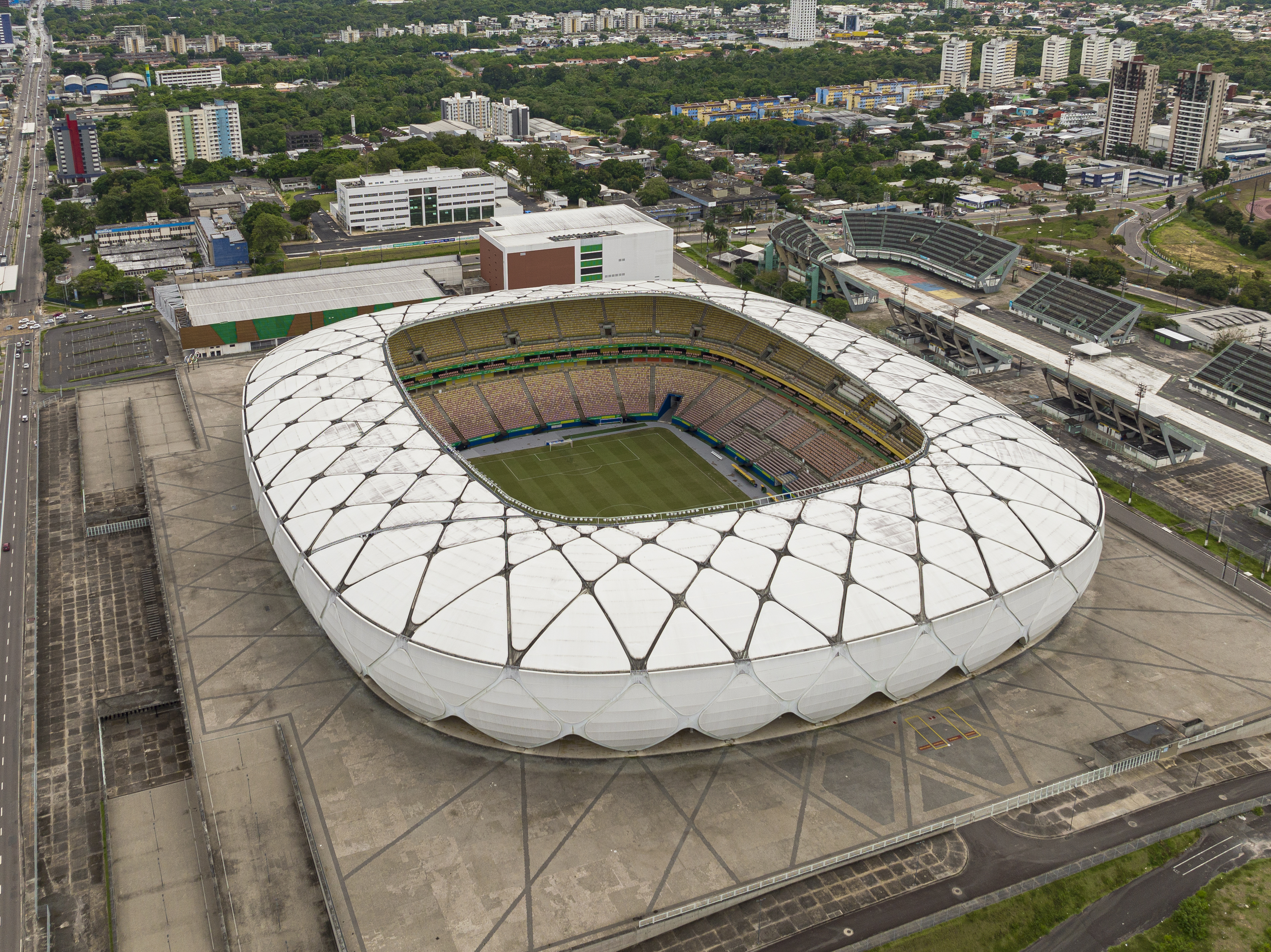
- Aerial view of the stadium in 2022; Sisbrace
- Interactive map of Arena da Amazônia
- Full name: Arena da Amazônia - Vivaldo Lima
- Location: Manaus, Amazonas, Brazil
- Coordinates: 3°4′59″S 60°1′41″W
- Owner: Amazonas State Government
- Capacity: 42,924
- Executive suites: 68
- Surface: Grass
- Field size: 105 x 68 m

Construction
- Built: 2010–14
- Opened: 9 March 2014
- Cost: R$605 million US$270 million €200 million
- Architect: gmp

Tenants
- Amazonas (some games; 2023-present); Nacional (2014–present); Manaus Futebol Clube (some games); Brazil national football team (selected matches)

Arena da Amazônia (Amazon Arena) is a football stadium in Manaus, Amazonas, Brazil, located on the former site of the Vivaldão stadium. The stadium has an all-seater capacity of 42,924 and was constructed from 2010 to 2014 as part of Brazil's hosting of the 2014 FIFA World Cup. It hosted matches of the football tournament at the 2016 Summer Olympics. During the World Cup, the arena had a limited maximum-capacity of 40,549.

== Design and construction ==
The stadium under construction in 2013.

Built on the site of the old Vivaldo Lima stadium, the Arena da Amazônia is located midway between Manaus International Airport and the historic center of the city. It is also near the Manaus Convention Center and the Amadeu Teixeira Arena. The cost of its construction was split with 25% paid by the Amazonas State Government and 75% by the Brazilian Development Bank.

The stadium was designed by German architecture firm Gerkan, Marg and Partners, with inspiration from the Amazon rainforest that surrounds the city of Manaus and its metallic exterior structure is designed to evoke the straw baskets that are made in the region. It was built by the Brazilian engineering firm Andrade Gutierrez and incorporates several sustainability-friendly features.

The stadium can seat around 44,300 spectators and features a restaurant, luxury suites, underground parking spaces and accessibility for people with special needs. It also includes an on-site rain water recycling system and sewage treatment facilities to reduce its water usage and is designed to make use of natural ventilation to reduce its consumption of energy. In addition, more than 95% of the material from the demolition of the old stadium was recycled.

Because the climate of Manaus is extremely warm due to its location near the equator, the stadium was designed to minimize the temperatures inside the structure with features such as a white, reflective exterior, plentiful shade over the seating areas, and a large amount of ventilation openings in the façade of the building.

Despite these efforts, England manager Roy Hodgson criticized the location of the stadium saying the extreme heat of Manaus makes it difficult for players. England later played its opening game against Italy in Manaus and lost 2–1. The average goals-per-game in Manaus tallied 3.5 goals compared to 2.7 for the total 2014 World Cup matches.

The stadium itself has been criticised for being too large for use after the World Cup, as local matches in Manaus draw small crowds. Arena da Amazônia has seen light use since the World Cup with occasional professional matches, Evangelical Christian events, and a Guns N' Roses concert. The stadium hosted several men's and women's football matches during the 2016 Olympics and some of Brazil's 2018 FIFA World Cup qualifying matches.

== 2014 FIFA World Cup ==
The stadium was still under construction by February 2014, and doubts were raised over whether or not it would have been ready to host the FIFA World Cup.

However, the stadium opened on 9 March 2014 and staged its opening match, a cup game in which Northern Brazilian teams Nacional FC and Clube do Remo participated.

The stadium hosted four games during the World Cup.

Date	Time (UTC-04)	Team #1	Result	Team #2	Round	Attendance
June 14, 2014	18:00	England	1–2	Italy	Group D	39,800
June 18, 2014	18:00	Cameroon	0–4	Croatia	Group A	39,982
June 22, 2014	18:00	United States	2–2	Portugal	Group G	40,123
June 25, 2014	16:00	Honduras	0–3	Switzerland	Group E	40,322

== Brazil national football team ==
Date	Time (UTC-04)	Team #1	Result	Team #2	Round	Attendance
September 5, 2016	20:45	Brazil	2–1	Colombia	2018 FIFA World Cup qualification	36,609
October 14, 2021	20:30	Brazil	4–1	Uruguay	2022 FIFA World Cup qualification	12,500

== Local engagement ==
The Arena da Amazônia is a source of pride and identity for Manaus residents. The four matches in 2014 brought international attention and pride to the city of two million in the Rainforest. The stadium and its Amazon-inspired design was initially celebrated as a venue that could bring economic opportunities to the region. However, local engagement has been challenging since the 2014 FIFA World Cup due to the limited number of events that can consistently fill the 44,000-seat stadium. Though the stadium hosts regional soccer matches and concerts, it has struggled to become an active venue for the people of Manaus without a high level soccer team.

The stadium does not have consistent events that were expected for a major urban stadium, but has retained some relevance within the community. The stadium has helped Manaus through community initiatives such as hosting cultural festivals. These alternative uses have redefined the stadium’s role in the community, allowing it to be a multipurpose public space rather than solely a sports venue.

== Economic impact ==
The substantial investment in the stadium without a long-term agenda frustrated many locals who believed the resources could have been used on healthcare, education, and infrastructure in Manaus. The large investment in the stadium, around $300 million, left resentment among many residents who felt the funds could have been more meaningfully used on local priorities. The allocation of resources away from socioeconomic challenges was viewed by locals as trying to appeal to international spectators rather than address the needs of the Manaus community. The stadium’s construction and limited use after the World Cup is viewed as a symbol of misplaced priorities and feel disconnected from the project.

The construction of the Arena da Amazônia did come with urban planning initiatives in Manaus, mainly to assist visitors for the 2014 World Cup. Eduardo Gomes International Airport was a primary focus of the upgrades to increase its capacity and improve its facilities. Transportation to the stadium was improved by expanding key roads and upgrading transportation infrastructure around the area. Despite the improvements to transportation infrastructure, they were mostly limited to the stadium area instead of general transit for the public.

The focus of government funds on the stadium over public needs left residents feeling that the project did not help their quality of life or access to services. In 2014, the stadium brought attention to Manaus on an international scale, but it has struggled to integrate into the local economy in a sustainable way. High costs of maintenance and limited demand has restricted its ability for economic value. Infrastructure improvements at the airport and around the stadium have had some benefits, but were not enough to significantly improve the city’s transit or public services in the long term.

== See also ==
- Estádio Vivaldo Lima
- Lists of stadiums
