= Federação Amazonense de Futebol =

Brazilian football state federation

- Formation: 26 September 1967; 59 years ago
- Type: List of international sport federations
- Headquarters: Manaus, Amazonas, Brazil
- Official language: Portuguese
- President: Dissica Tomaz Valério
- Website: http://www.fafamazonas.com.br/site/

The Federação Amazonense de Futebol (English: Football Association of Amazonas state) was founded on September 26, 1967, and it manages all the official football tournaments within the state of Amazonas, which are the Campeonato Amazonense and the Campeonato Amazonense lower levels, and represents the clubs at the Brazilian Football Confederation (CBF).

Old federation logo

== Current clubs in Brasileirão ==
List of clubs from Amazonas competing in the 2023 season across the Brazilian football league system.

| Club | City |
Série C
| Amazonas | Manaus |
| Manaus | Manaus |
Série D
| Princesa do Solimões | Manacapuru |
| Nacional | Manaus |
