= Sul América Esporte Clube =

Brazilian Football Club

Sul América
- Full name: Sul América Esporte Clube
- Nickname(s): Trem da Colina; O Time da Glória; Sulão
- Founded: May 1, 1932
- Ground: SESI, Manaus, Amazonas state, Brazil
- Capacity: 5,000
- League: Campeonato Amazonense Second Division
- 2021: Campeonato Amazonense Second Divisione 5th of 7
- Website: https://www.facebook.com/SulAmericaEsporteClube/?eid=ARB58DtCRejMnry8zrMnrBgx8VPzFxVViOeP5Lb-77KBzGWpLE-t6c6NrsJFNtoX-h0LfBVpclSSmOO8 Facebook
Home colours	Away colours

Sul América Esporte Clube, commonly known as Sul América, is a Brazilian football club based in Manaus, Amazonas. They won the Campeonato Amazonense two times and competed in the Copa do Brasil once.

== History ==
The club was founded on May 1, 1932. They won the Campeonato Amazonense in 1992 and in 1993. Sul América competed in the Copa do Brasil in 1993, when they were eliminated in the First Stage by Rio Branco.

== Stadium ==
Sul América Esporte Clube play their home games at Estádio Roberto Simonsen, commonly known as SESI. The stadium has a maximum capacity of 5,000 people. Until July 2010, the club played their home games at Vivaldão. Vivaldão had a maximum capacity of 31,000 people.

== Honours ==
=== State ===
- Campeonato Amazonense
  - Winners (2): 1992, 1993
- Copa Amazonas
  - Winners (2): 1975, 1977
- Taça Estado do Amazonas
  - Winners (1): 1993
- Taça Cidade de Manaus
  - Winners (2): 1992, 1993
- Torneio Início do Amazonas
  - Winners (5): 1961, 1977, 1987, 1989, 1993

=== Women's Football ===
- Taça Brasil de Futebol Feminino
  - Winners (1): 1990
- Campeonato Amazonense Feminino
  - Winners (2): 1984, 1986
