= Esporte Clube Iranduba da Amazônia =

Iranduba
- Full name: Esporte Clube Iranduba da Amazônia
- Nickname(s): Alviverde; Verdão; Esmeralda; Hulk da Amazônia
- Founded: January 18, 2011
- Ground: Estádio SESI, Iranduba, Amazonas state, Brazil
- Capacity: 2,000
Home colors	Away colors

Esporte Clube Iranduba da Amazônia, commonly known as Iranduba, is a Brazilian men's and women's football club based in Iranduba, Amazonas state. The women's team competed in the Copa do Brasil de Futebol Feminino once.

== History ==
The club was founded on January 18, 2011. They won the Campeonato Amazonense Second Level in 2011, sharing the title with Manicoré and thus being promoted to the 2012 Campeonato Amazonense.

=== Women's team ===
The women's team competed in the Copa do Brasil in 2011, when they were eliminated in the Round of 16 by Tuna Luso.

== Honours ==
=== State ===
- Campeonato Amazonense Second Division
  - Winners (1): 2018

=== Women's Football ===
- Campeonato Amazonense de Futebol Feminino
  - Winners (8): 2011, 2012, 2013, 2014, 2015, 2016, 2017, 2018

== Stadium ==
Esporte Clube Iranduba da Amazônia play their home games at Estádio SESI. The stadium has a maximum capacity of 2,000 people.
