= Vivaldão =

Stadium in Manaus, Brazil

Coordinates: 3°4′59″S 60°1′41″W

Estádio Vivaldo Lima
- Vivaldão
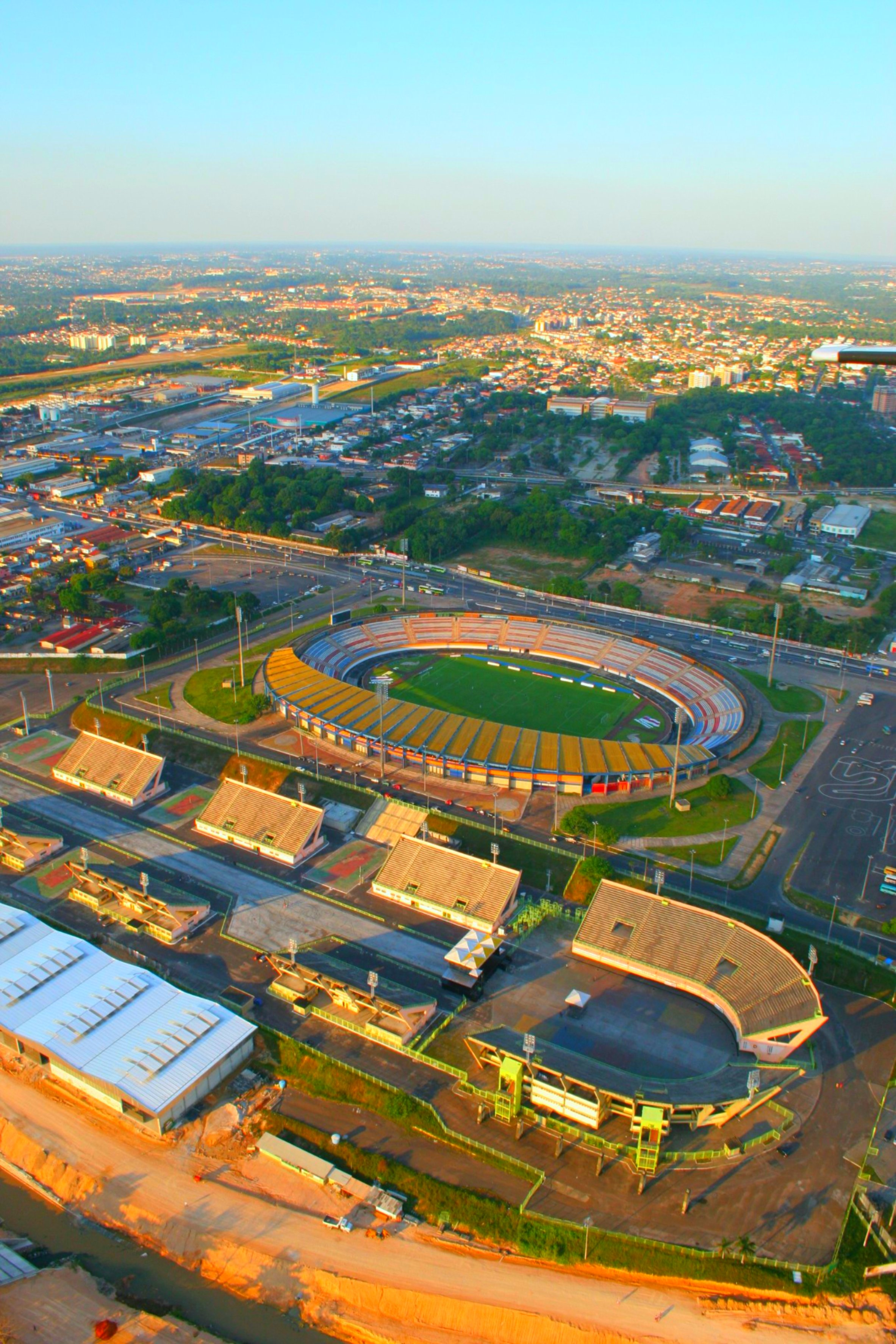
- Interactive map of Estádio Vivaldo Lima
- Location: Manaus, Brazil
- Owner: Governo do Estado do Amazonas
- Capacity: 31,000
- Surface: Grass
- Field size: 108 x 70 m

Construction
- Opened: 5 April 1970
- Renovated: 1995
- Closed: 2010
- Demolished: 2011

Estádio Vivaldo Lima, usually known by its nickname Vivaldão, was a multi-purpose stadium in Manaus, Brazil. It was formerly used mostly for football matches. The stadium held 36,000, with 31,000 seats. It was built between 1958 and 1970.

The Vivaldão was owned by the government of Amazonas state. The stadium was named after Vivaldo Lima, who was the founder of Nacional Fast Clube and it was the home ground of América Futebol Clube (AM), Nacional Futebol Clube and Atlético Rio Negro Clube.

The stadium was demolished in 2011 and replaced by the Arena da Amazônia.

== History ==
In 1970, construction of the Vivaldão was completed. The inaugural match was played on April 5 of that year, when Brazil national football team B beat Amazonas State All-Stars team B 4–1, followed by the match of the teams A, also 4–1. The first goal of the stadium was scored by Brazil B's Dadá Maravilha.

The stadium's record attendance was 56,950, set on March 9, 1980 when Fast Clube and New York Cosmos of the United States drew 0-0.

== Demolition ==
On May 31, 2009, Manaus was chosen as one of the host cities of the 2014 FIFA World Cup. The city's project involved the demolition of the Vivaldão, and a new stadium built in its place, the Arena da Amazônia, with a capacity of 41,000 people. About R$580,000,000 was invested in the construction of the new stadium, which will include sport and recreation areas and a shopping mall.

The stadium was closed on March 19, 2010, and demolition began on July 12.
