= Grêmio Atlético Coariense =

Grêmio Coariense
- Full name: Grêmio Atlético Coariense
- Nickname(s): Gavião da Floresta; Tricolor de Coari; Primeiro Campeão do Interior
- Founded: January 6, 1977
- Dissolved: 2013
- Ground: Estádio Manoel Brasil de Melo, Coari, Amazonas state, Brazil
- Capacity: 5,000
Home colours	Away colours

Grêmio Atlético Coariense, commonly known as Grêmio Coariense, was a Brazilian football club based in Coari, Amazonas state. They competed in the Copa do Brasil twice and in the Série C once.

== History ==
The club was founded on January 6, 1977. Grêmio Coariense won the Campeonato Amazonense in 2005. They competed in the Copa do Brasil in 2005, when they were eliminated in the First Round by Remo, and in 2006, when they were eliminated in the First Round by Vila Nova. Grêmio Coariense competed in the Série C in 2005, when they were eliminated in the First Stage of the competition.

== Honours ==
- Campeonato Amazonense
  - Winners (1): 2005
- Taça Estado do Amazonas
  - Winners (2): 2004, 2005
- Taça Cidade de Manaus
  - Winners (1): 2005

== Stadium ==
Grêmio Atlético Coariense play their home games at Estádio Manoel Brasil de Melo. The stadium has a maximum capacity of 5,000 people.
