= Penarol Atlético Clube =

Brazilian association football club based in Itacoatiara, Amazonas, Brazil

Penarol
- Full name: Penarol Atlético Clube
- Nicknames: Leão da Velha Serpa (Old Serpa's Lion); Leão Azul (Blue Lion)
- Founded: 8 August 1947; 78 years ago
- Ground: Estádio Floro de Mendonça
- Capacity: 5,000
- President: Ila Rabelo
- Head coach: Edmílson de Jesus
- League: Campeonato Amazonense
- 2021 2021: Série D, 22nd of 68; Amazonense, 7th of 9
Home colors	Away colors

Penarol Atlético Clube, commonly known as Penarol, is a Brazilian football club based in Itacoatiara, Amazonas.

Penarol is currently ranked third among Amazonas teams in CBF's national club ranking at 130th place overall. They are the best placed team in the state from outside of Greater Manaus.

== History ==
The club was founded on August 8, 1947, by Luiz Calheiros Gama, Marcos Esteves, Sebastião Mestrinho, Simões Sales de Souza, Laureano Seixas and Antônio Gesta Filho. Penarol won the Campeonato Amazonense in 2010 and in 2011. The club will compete in the 2011 Série D.

== Current squad ==
As of 9 February 2021

Note: Flags indicate national team as defined under FIFA eligibility rules; some limited exceptions apply. Players may hold more than one non-FIFA nationality.

No.	Pos.	Nation	Player
—	GK	BRA	Bernardo Carvalho
—	GK	BRA	Pedro Henrique
—	GK	BRA	Lucas
—	DF	BRA	Deurick
—	DF	BRA	Iuri
—	DF	BRA	Marquinhos
—	DF	BRA	Ivan
—	DF	BRA	Alberto
—	DF	BRA	Marcos Rangel
—	DF	BRA	Janderson
—	DF	BRA	Igor Batista

No.	Pos.	Nation	Player
—	MF	BRA	Panda
—	MF	BRA	Júlio Campos
—	MF	BRA	Ramon
—	MF	BRA	Marcelo Cardoso
—	MF	BRA	Edinho Corrêa
—	MF	BRA	Rony
—	FW	BRA	Jairo Paraíba
—	FW	URU	Beto Acosta
—	FW	BRA	Lucas Espiga
—	FW	BRA	Denner
—	FW	BRA	Davi

== Honours ==
- Campeonato Amazonense
  - Winners (3): 2010, 2011, 2020
- Taça Estado do Amazonas
  - Winners (1): 2011
- Taça Cidade de Manaus
  - Winners (1): 2010
- Torneio Início do Amazonas
  - Winners (1): 1988
