= Nacional Fast Clube =

Brazilian association football club based in Manaus, Amazonas, Brazil

Fast Clube
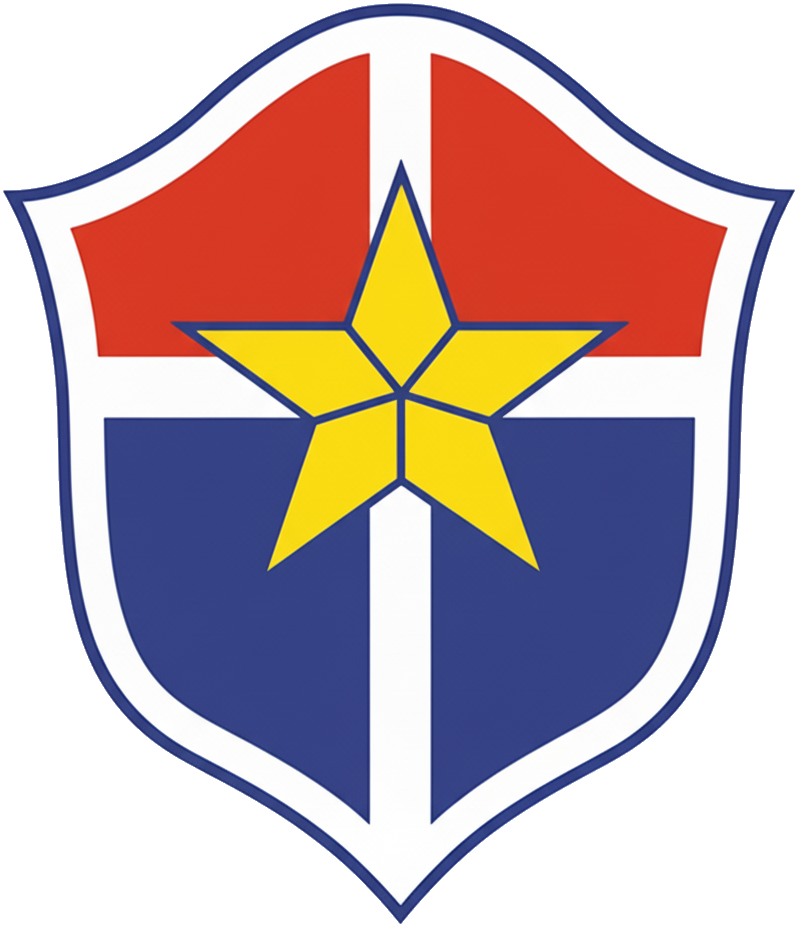
- Full name: Nacional Fast Clube
- Nicknames: Tricolor do Boulevard (Threecolour of Boulevard); Rolo Compressor (Steamroller)
- Founded: 8 July 1930; 96 years ago
- Ground: Estádio Ismael Benigno; Arena da Amazônia (most games)
- Capacity: 10,000; 44,000
- President: Denis Albuquerque
- Head coach: Darlan Borges
- League: Campeonato Amazonense Segunda Divisão
- 2025: Amazonense Segunda Divisão 8th of 10
- Website: https://equipes.supporters.com.br/fastclube/
Home colors	Away colors

Nacional Fast Clube, or Fast Clube, as they are usually called, is a Brazilian football team from Manaus in Amazonas, founded on 8 July 1930.

Fast is the third-best ranked team from Amazonas in CBF's national club ranking, behind Manaus and Amazonas.

== History ==
The club was founded in 1930 by a group of members and players of the Nacional, who led by the leader Vivaldo Lima and captain Rodolpho Gonçalves decided to leave the club. The reason for the rupture was a disagreement with the club's internal policy.

Goncalves suggested a change in the club's statute regarding players having to pay monthly fees and player voting rights. On the eve of the presidential election, Leopoldo Mattos changed the statute, taking away the players right to vote. The athletes wanted Vivaldo Lima for the presidency, but with the maneuver imposed by Vivaldo Lima, the players, voided in their statutory rights, did not accept the imposition and decided to leave, and with the idea of a new club, founded Fast and made Vivaldo Lima the first president.

The new club kept some of the characteristics of the old club, like the name, the initials NFC, the colors red, blue and white, and finally the yellow star to the center of the shield. The group then decided to consult teacher Carlos Mesquita to suggest a name beginning with the letter F to differentiate itself from the old club. Thus, the English-speaking teacher christened the club the term "Fast", making an analogy to the speed and dexterity that the players who founded the new football association had on the pitch.

The club's first titles were in 1948 and 1949, a two-time championship of the Campeonato Amazonense. In 1970 and 1971 it won another state championship. From then on, Fast Clube experienced a 45-year title drought, which was broken on 22 August 2016, winning their seventh title.

== Rivalries ==
Fast Clube's rivals are Nacional, Rio Negro and São Raimundo-AM. The biggest rival is Nacional, who make the derby called Pai vs. Filho (Father Vs. Son), due to the fact that the Fast Clube was founded by dissidents of the Nacional, and for that reason, the press at the time and the own fans of National nicknamed the derby like that.

== Stadium ==
Fast Clube's stadium is Estádio da ULBRA, which has a maximum capacity of 4,000 people. Estádio Ismael Benigno and Arena da Amazônia also held several Fast Clube matches.

== Honours ==
=== Regional ===
- Torneio do Norte
  - Winners (1): 1970

=== State ===
- Campeonato Amazonense
  - Winners (7): 1948, 1949, 1955, 1960, 1970, 1971, 2016
  - Runners-up (28): 1932, 1933, 1934, 1935, 1936, 1937, 1938, 1942, 1947, 1950, 1951, 1952, 1953, 1957, 1968, 1969, 1972, 1977, 1978, 1981, 1991, 2006, 2007, 2008, 2010, 2012, 2018, 2019
- Copa Amazonas
  - Winners (5): 1955, 1964, 1971, 1972, 2015
- Campeonato Amazonense Second Division
  - Winners (1): 1931
- Taça Estado do Amazonas
  - Winners (12): 1964, 1965, 1971, 1972, 1977, 1979, 1980, 1981, 1991, 2007, 2008, 2010
- Taça Cidade de Manaus
  - Winners (6): 1970, 1980, 1991, 2012, 2014, 2015
- Torneio Início do Amazonas
  - Winners (6): 1957, 1972, 1985, 1994, 2006, 2017
