= Manaus Futebol Clube =

Brazilian association football club

Manaus
- Full name: Manaus Futebol Clube
- Nicknames: Gavião do Norte (Northern Hawk); Gavião Real (Harpy Eagle); Esmeraldino (Emerald)
- Founded: 5 May 2013; 13 years ago
- Ground: Arena da Amazônia
- Capacity: 44,000
- President: Giovanni Silva
- Head coach: Higo Magalhães
- League: Campeonato Brasileiro Série D Campeonato Amazonense
- 2025 2025: Série D, 20th of 64; Amazonense, 3rd of 10
- Website: https://manausfc.com.br/
Home colors	Away colors	Third colors

Manaus Futebol Clube, commonly referred to as Manaus, is a Brazilian professional football club based in Manaus, Amazonas founded on 5 May 2013. It competes in the Campeonato Brasileiro Série D, the fourth tier of Brazilian football, as well as in the Campeonato Amazonense, the top flight of the Amazonas state football league.

Manaus is the best ranked team from Amazonas in CBF's national club ranking, followed by Amazonas and Fast, respectively in second and third.

== History ==
The club emerged as a project of the city councilman of Manaus, Luís Mitoso, after he left the board of Nacional for private matters. Mitoso retired from Nacional in March 2013, when he was vice president of the club, after four years leading the club as president, in the company of Giovane Alves.

Manaus was officially founded on May 5, 2013. In the same year, it won the second division of Campeonato Amazonense. After being usually 5th or 6th in 2014 to 2016, in 2017, the club won the title of the main division of the Campeonato Amazonense after defeating Nacional in the final.

In 2018, Manaus once again won the main division of the Campeonato Amazonense by defeating Fast Clube in the final. They also played Série D later that year. They were knocked out in the quarter-finals by Imperatriz-MA on penalties, denying them a spot in Série C for 2019.

In 2019, Manaus won for the third time straight the Campeonato Amazonense, against Fast again. In Série D, Manaus easily qualified to the knockout phase as the best team in overall standings. They gained promotion to 2020's Série C after defeating Caxias 3–0 on the second leg of the quarter-finals after losing 1-0 in Caxias' home.

== Stadium ==
Manaus play their home games at Estádio da Colina. The stadium has a maximum capacity of 10,400 people. They also tend to play in Arena da Amazônia on big games.

== Honours ==
=== Official tournaments ===
State
Competitions	Titles	Seasons
Campeonato Amazonense	6	2017, 2018, 2019, 2021, 2022, 2024
Campeonato Amazonense Second Division	1	2013

=== Others tournaments ===
==== State ====
- Taça Estado do Amazonas (1): 2020
- Taça Cidade de Manaus (3): 2017, 2018, 2019
- Taça Rio Negro (1): 2024

=== Runners-up ===
- Campeonato Brasileiro Série D (1): 2019
- Campeonato Amazonense (1): 2020
