= São Raimundo Esporte Clube (AM) =

Brazilian association football club based in Manaus, Amazonas, Brazil

São Raimundo
- Full name: São Raimundo Esporte Clube
- Nicknames: Tufão (Tropical Cyclone); Tufão da Colina (Colina's Tropical Cyclone); Mundico; Alviceleste da Colina (White and Sky Blue from Colina)
- Founded: 18 November 1918; 107 years ago
- Ground: Estádio Ismael Benigno
- Capacity: 10,000
- President: Josimar Alves
- Head coach: Emerson Almeida
- League: Campeonato Amazonense
- 2025: Amazonense, 7th of 8
| Home colors | Away colors |

São Raimundo Esporte Clube, commonly referred to as São Raimundo, is a Brazilian professional club based in Manaus, Amazonas founded on 18 November 1918. It competes in the Campeonato Amazonense, the top flight of the Amazonas state football league.

The club is named after their neighborhood, which is named after Saint Raymond. Saint Raymond is also the patron saint of the neighborhood of São Raimundo.

== History ==
In 1915, Risópolis Clube Recreativo was founded by Francisco Rebelo and Professor Assis. On November 18, 1918, the club changed its name to Risófoli Clube Recreativo. In December of the same year the club changed its name to São Raimundo Esporte Clube.

In 1956, São Raimundo played for the first time in Campeonato Amazonense First Division. In 1961, the club won their first state championship. From 1999 to 2001, the club won three Copa Norte titles in a row. These were the club's first regional competition titles.

In 1999, after finishing second in the Brazilian Série C, São Raimundo earned promotion to the Série B, the second division of Brazilian football. It stayed there until 2006, when São Raimundo were relegated to the Série C following a poor campaign in which the club finished 19th out of 20 clubs.

== Stadium ==
São Raimundo's stadium is Estádio Ismael Benigno, inaugurated in 1961, with a maximum capacity of 16,000 people.

== Rivals ==
São Raimundo's greatest rivals are Nacional, Rio Negro and Sul América.

== Anthem ==
The club's anthem was composed by Francisco da Silva, in 1997, and it is called just São Raimundo.Recorded at the São Raimundo headquarters in Manaus

== Honours ==
=== Official tournaments ===
Regional
| Competitions | Titles | Seasons |
|---|---|---|
| Copa Norte | 3 | 1999, 2000, 2001 |
State
| Competitions | Titles | Seasons |
| Campeonato Amazonense | 7 | 1961, 1966, 1997, 1998, 1999, 2004, 2006 |
| Campeonato Amazonense Second Division | 1 | 2017 |

- record

=== Others tournaments ===
==== State ====
- Taça Estado do Amazonas (4): 1964, 1999, 2000, 2006
- Taça Cidade de Manaus (5): 1997, 1998, 1999, 2004, 2006
- Torneio Início do Amazonas (4): 1956, 1963, 1998, 2005

=== Runners-up ===
- Campeonato Brasileiro Série C (1): 1999
- Copa Norte (2): 1998, 2002
- Campeonato Amazonense (3): 1964, 2000, 2021
- Copa Amazonas (4): 1972, 1978, 1988, 1989
- Campeonato Amazonense Second Division (2): 2019, 2023

=== Women's Football ===
- Campeonato Amazonense de Futebol Feminino (1): 2010
