= Princesa do Solimões Esporte Clube =

Brazilian association football club based in Manacapuru, Amazonas, Brazil

Princesa do Solimões
- Full name: Princesa do Solimões Esporte Clube
- Nickname: Tubarão do Norte (The Northern Shark)
- Founded: 18 August 1971; 54 years ago
- Ground: Gilbertão
- Capacity: 15,000
- President: Modesto Alexandre
- Head coach: Aderbal Lana
- League: Campeonato Amazonense
- 2025: Amazonense, 6th of 8
Home colors	Away colors

Princesa do Solimões Esporte Clube, commonly referred to as Princesa do Solimões, is a Brazilian professional football club based in Manacapuru, Amazonas founded on 18 August 1971. It competes in the Campeonato Brasileiro Série D, the fourth tier of Brazilian football, as well as in the Campeonato Amazonense, the top flight of the Amazonas state football league.

== History ==
The club was founded on 18 August 1971. Princesa do Solimões competed in the Série B in 1989, when they were eliminated in the First Stage of the competition. They won the Campeonato Amazonense for the first time in 2013.

== Honours ==
- Campeonato Amazonense
  - Winners (1): 2013
  - Runners-up (6): 1995, 1997, 2014, 2015, 2016, 2022
- Taça Estado do Amazonas
  - Winners (5): 1989, 1995, 1997, 2013, 2014
- Taça Cidade de Manaus
  - Winners (1): 2016

== Stadium ==
Princesa do Solimões Esporte Clube play their home games at Estádio Olímpico Municipal Gilberto Mestrinho, nicknamed Gilbertão. The stadium has a maximum capacity of 15,000 people.
