= Atlético Rio Negro Clube =

Rio Negro
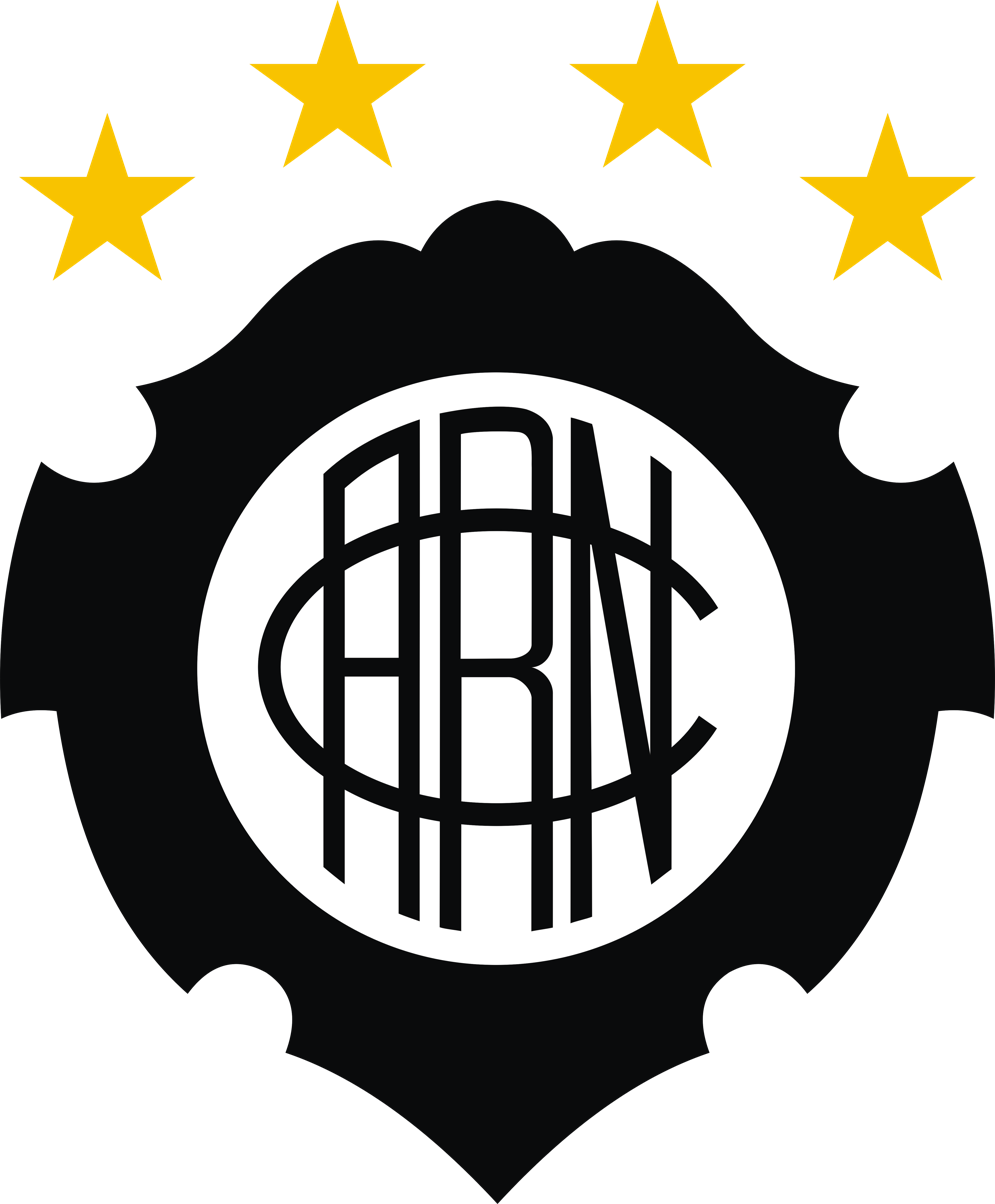
- Full name: Atlético Rio Negro Clube
- Nicknames: Barriga Preta (Black Belly); Galo da Praça da Saudade (Rooster of the Praça da Saudade)
- Founded: November 13, 1913
- Ground: Carlos Zamith, Manaus, Brazil
- Capacity: 5000
- President: Thales Verçosa
- Head coach: João Carlos Cavalo
- League: Campeonato Amazonense Second Division
- 2022: 1st of 9 (champions)
Home colours	Away colours

Atlético Rio Negro Clube, usually known simply as Rio Negro is a traditional Brazilian football club from Manaus, Amazonas state.

Rio Negro is the second oldest club of Amazonas state, and is eleven months younger than its rival, Nacional. Atlético Rio Negro Clube of Roraima state is named after the club, and shares the same logo, colors and kits.

== History ==
On November 13, 1913, 14-year-old Shinda Uchôa and his friends founded Atlético Rio Negro Clube at Manuel Afonso do Nascimento (who was one of the founders) home. The club was named after the Negro River. Rio Negro's first president was Edgar Lobão. Shinda Uchôa was nominated president of honor. In 1921, Rio Negro won its first title, the state championship.

In 1973, the club competed in the Campeonato Brasileiro Série A for the first time, finishing in the 30th position. In the following year, in 1974, Rio Negro finished in Campeonato Brasileiro Série A's 26th position, ahead of Botafogo. That was the club's all-time best position in the competition. In 1986, the club competed in the Campeonato Brasileiro Série A for the last time, finishing in the 41st position. In 1989, Rio Negro competed Copa do Brasil's first edition. The club was eliminated in the first round by Vasco da Gama of Rio de Janeiro. In the first leg, in Manaus, Vasco and Rio Negro drew 1–1, and in the second leg, in Rio de Janeiro, Vasco won 2–1.

== Honours ==
=== Official tournaments ===
State
Competitions	Titles	Seasons
Campeonato Amazonense	16	1921, 1927, 1931, 1932, 1938, 1940, 1943, 1962, 1965, 1975, 1982, 1987, 1988, 1989, 1990, 2001
Copa Amazonas	4	1976, 1979, 1982, 1988
Campeonato Amazonense Second Division	3^{s}	1917, 2008, 2022

- record
- ^{s} shared record

=== Others tournaments ===
==== International ====
- Guiana International Cup (1): 1963

==== State ====
- Taça Estado do Amazonas (10): 1966, 1968, 1976, 1982, 1987, 1988, 1990, 1998, 2003, 2017
- Taça Cidade de Manaus (5): 1973, 1982, 1983, 1984, 1986
- Torneio Início ACLEA (11): 1933, 1966, 1968, 1969, 1979, 1980, 1982, 1983, 1990, 1995, 2002

=== Runners-up ===
- Campeonato Amazonense (26): 1916, 1917, 1918, 1920, 1922, 1923, 1928, 1939, 1941, 1944, 1945, 1961, 1966, 1973, 1974, 1976, 1979, 1980, 1983, 1984, 1985, 1986, 1992, 1998, 1999, 2003
- Copa Amazonas (7): 1964, 1974, 1975, 1980, 1981, 1984, 2000
- Campeonato Amazonense Second Division (3): 1915, 2010, 2014

=== Women's Football ===
- Campeonato Amazonense de Futebol Feminino (1): 2007

== Stadium ==
Rio Negro's home stadium is Vivaldão, inaugurated in 1961, with a maximum capacity of 43,000 people.

Only one training ground is owned by the club. Campo de Treinamento Rinha do Galo is located in Manaus.

== Rivals ==
Rio Negro biggest rivals are Nacional (AM) and São Raimundo (AM). The derby against Nacional is called Rio-Nal, and is an old and traditional city derby, which is considered one of the biggest derbies of the city. The derby against São Raimundo is one of the new derbies of the city, and it started due to the successful performance of São Raimundo in recent years.

== Symbols ==
The club's mascot is called Galo Carijó, which is a rooster species. The club has several different nicknames, such as clube barriga-preta (meaning black belly club, which is a reference to the club's home kit), galo carijó (carijó rooster), time da Praça da Saudade (Saudade Town Square team), clube da elite (elite club) and negão (big black). Rio Negro's colors are black and white.

== Ultra groups ==
There are several ultra groups supporting the club:

- Galo Hulk
- Galoucura

== Other sports ==
Besides football, Rio Negro also has other sports sections, such as basketball, volleyball, gymnastics, and futsal.
