= Nacional Futebol Clube =

Brazilian association football club based in Manaus, Amazonas, Brazil

Nacional
- Full name: Nacional Futebol Clube
- Nicknames: Naça; Leão da Vila Municipal (Municipal Village Lion); Clube da Estrela Azul (Blue Star Club); Leão do Amazonas (Amazonas' Lion)
- Founded: 13 January 1913; 113 years ago
- Ground: Arena da Amazônia
- Capacity: 44,000
- President: Augusto Ferraz
- Head coach: Luan Carlos
- League: Campeonato Brasileiro Série D Campeonato Amazonense
- 2025: Amazonense, 2nd of 8
- Website: nacionalfc.com.br
Home colors	Away colors

Nacional Futebol Clube, commonly referred to as Nacional, is a Brazilian professional club based in Manaus, Amazonas. Founded in 1913, it competes in the Campeonato Brasileiro Série D, the fourth tier of Brazilian football, as well as in the Campeonato Amazonense, the top flight of the Amazonas state football league.

The club has won 44 Campeonato Amazonense titles, the most in the state.

== History ==
On January 13, 1913, Nacional Futebol Clube was founded. The club was initially named Eleven Nacional.

On February 8, 1914, Nacional played the first Campeonato Amazonense match, against Manaós Sporting.

On July 8, 1930, Nacional Futebol Clube former members who were dissatisfied with the club founded Nacional Fast Clube.

In 1975, Nacional finished in Campeonato Brasileiro Série A's 16th position, ahead of clubs such as Vasco da Gama, Atlético Mineiro and Santos.

From 1976 to 1981, Nacional won six state titles in a row to complete a "hexacampeonato".

In 1985, Nacional competed for the last time the Campeonato Brasileiro Série A. The club finished in the 18th position, ahead of clubs like Fluminense, Grêmio and São Paulo. The club competed in 1992 in Copa do Brasil for the first time, being eliminated by Vasco da Gama in the first round. The first leg, in Manaus, ended in a 1–1 draw. In the second leg, in Rio de Janeiro, Vasco beat Nacional 5–0.

The club had a historic run in the 2013 Copa do Brasil, eliminating top-flight teams Coritiba and Ponte Preta before being eliminated by Vasco.

In 2026, Nacional reclaimed the state championship after an 11 year absence, beating Amazonas FC. Later in the year, the club achieved its first ever promotion in the domestic leagues by eliminating CSA in the Série D promotion play-offs after winning the first leg in Manaus 3–1, and on the second leg in Maceió, a goalless draw clinched the club's spot in the 2027 Série C, its first appearance in over twenty seasons.

== Honours ==
=== Official tournaments ===
State
Competitions	Titles	Seasons
Campeonato Amazonense	44	1916, 1917, 1918, 1919, 1920, 1922, 1923, 1933, 1936, 1937, 1939, 1941, 1942, 1945, 1946, 1950, 1957, 1963, 1964, 1968, 1969, 1972, 1974, 1976, 1977, 1978, 1979, 1980, 1981, 1983, 1984, 1985, 1986, 1991, 1995, 1996, 2000, 2002, 2003, 2007, 2012, 2014, 2015, 2026
Copa Amazonas	10	1969, 1970, 1974, 1975, 1980, 1981, 1982, 1984, 1999, 2000

- record

=== Other tournaments ===
==== State ====
- Taça Estado do Amazonas (20): 1963, 1967, 1969, 1974, 1975, 1978, 1979, 1981, 1983, 1984, 1985, 1986, 1991, 1992, 1994, 1996, 2001, 2009, 2012, 2015
- Taça Cidade de Manaus (25): 1964, 1965, 1966, 1968, 1969, 1972, 1974, 1976, 1977, 1978, 1979, 1981, 1984, 1985, 1987, 1989, 1990, 1995, 2000, 2001, 2002, 2003, 2007, 2011, 2013
- Taça Rio Negro (2): 2025, 2026
- Torneio Início ACLEA (15): 1946, 1948, 1962, 1964, 1967, 1970, 1973, 1974, 1975, 1978, 1981, 1992, 1999, 2000, 2004

=== Runners-up ===
- Copa Norte (1): 2026
- Campeonato Amazonense (24): 1914, 1921, 1940, 1954, 1956, 1959, 1962, 1965, 1967, 1970, 1975, 1982, 1987, 1989, 1990, 1993, 1994, 2001, 2005, 2009, 2011, 2013, 2017, 2025
- Copa Amazonas (6): 1955, 1967, 1971, 1973, 1979, 1988
- Campeonato Amazonense Second Division (1): 1917

== Stadium ==
Nacional's home stadium is the Arena da Amazônia, opened in 2014, with a maximum capacity of 41,000 people. The stadium was built on the site of the old Vivaldao, which was demolished in order to construct a new stadium for the 2014 FIFA World Cup.

The clubs training ground is called Campo de Treinamento Barbosa Filho.

== Rivals ==
Nacional's biggest rivals are Rio Negro and São Raimundo (AM).

The derby against Rio Negro is called Rio-Nal, and is a traditional city derby, considered one of the biggest derbies of the city.

The derby against São Raimundo is the second biggest derby of the city, and it started due to the good performance of São Raimundo in recent years.

== Symbols ==
The club's mascot is called Leão Azul, meaning "blue lion". Nacional is nicknamed Naça, which is the diminutive form of the name Nacional, Leão Azul (Blue Lion) and Time da Estrela Azul (Blue Star Team). The club colors are blue and white.

== Ultra groups ==
- Torcida Organizadas do Nacional
- Torcida Organizada Leões da Amazônia
- Torcida Organizada Naça Gol
- Torcida Organizada Naçacanagem
- Torcida Organizada Narraça
- Torcida Organizada Selva Azul
