= Campeonato Amazonense =

Football championship in Amazonas, Brazil

- Organising body: FAF
- Founded: 1914; 112 years ago (as different amateur leagues); 1965; 61 years ago (as the professional Campeonato Amazonense)
- Country: Brazil
- State: (Amazonas (Brazilian state)) Amazonas
- Level on pyramid: 1
- Relegation to: Campeonato Amazonense Second Division
- Domestic cup(s): Copa Verde; Copa do Brasil
- Current champions: Nacional (44th title) (2026)
- Most championships: Nacional (44 titles)
- Broadcaster(s): TV A Crítica
- Website: FAF Official website

The Campeonato Amazonense de Futebol, also commonly known as the Barezão, is the top-flight professional state football league in the Brazilian state of Amazonas. It is run by the Amazonas Football Federation (FAF).

== List of champions ==
=== Amateur era ===
Season	Champions	Runners-up
1914	Manaos Athletic (1)	Nacional
1915	Manaos Athletic (2)	Manaos Sporting
1916	Nacional (1)	Rio Negro
1917	Nacional (2)	Rio Negro
1918	Nacional (3)	Rio Negro
1919	Nacional (4)	Manaos Sporting
1920	Nacional (5)	Rio Negro
1921	Rio Negro (1)	Nacional
1922	Nacional (6)	Rio Negro
1923	Nacional (7)	Rio Negro
1924–1926	Not held	
1927	Rio Negro (2)	Luso
1928	Cruzeiro do Sul (1)	Rio Negro
1929	Manaos Sporting (1)	Cruzeiro do Sul
1930	Cruzeiro do Sul (2)	
1931	Rio Negro (3)	
1932	Rio Negro (4)	Fast Clube
1933	Nacional (8)	Fast Clube
1934	Portuguesa (1)	Fast Clube
1935	Portuguesa (2)	Fast Clube
1936	Nacional (9)	Fast Clube
1937	Nacional (10)	Fast Clube
1938	Rio Negro (5)	Fast Clube
1939	Nacional (11)	Rio Negro
1940	Rio Negro (6)	Nacional
1941	Nacional (12)	Rio Negro
1942	Nacional (13)	Fast Clube
1943	Rio Negro (7)	Olímpico
1944	Olímpico (1)	Rio Negro
1945	Nacional (14)	Rio Negro
1946	Nacional (15)	Olímpico
1947	Olímpico (2)	Fast Clube
1948	Fast Clube (1)	Barés
1949	Fast Clube (2)	Eldorado
1950	Nacional (16)	Fast Clube
1951	América (1)	Fast Clube
1952	América (2)	Fast Clube
1953	América (3)	Fast Clube
1954	América (4)	Nacional
1955	Fast Clube (3)	América
1956	Auto Esporte (1)	Nacional
1957	Nacional (17)	Fast Clube
1958	Santos (1)	Auto Esporte
1959	Auto Esporte (2)	Nacional
1960	Fast Clube (4)	América
1961	São Raimundo (1)	Rio Negro
1962	Rio Negro (8)	Nacional
1963	Nacional (18)	América

=== Professional era ===
Season	Champions	Runners-up
1964	Nacional (19)	São Raimundo
1965	Rio Negro (9)	Nacional
1966	São Raimundo (2)	Rio Negro
1967	Olímpico (3)	Nacional
1968	Nacional (20)	Fast Clube
1969	Nacional (21)	Fast Clube
1970	Fast Clube (5)	Nacional
1971	Fast Clube (6)	Rodoviária
1972	Nacional (22)	Fast Clube
1973	Rodoviária (1)	Rio Negro
1974	Nacional (23)	Rio Negro
1975	Rio Negro (10)	Nacional
1976	Nacional (24)	Rio Negro
1977	Nacional (25)	Fast Clube
1978	Nacional (26)	Fast Clube
1979	Nacional (27)	Rio Negro
1980	Nacional (28)	Rio Negro
1981	Nacional (29)	Fast Clube
1982	Rio Negro (11)	Nacional
1983	Nacional (30)	Rio Negro
1984	Nacional (31)	Rio Negro
1985	Nacional (32)	Rio Negro
1986	Nacional (33)	Rio Negro
1987	Rio Negro (12)	Nacional
1988	Rio Negro (13)	América
1989	Rio Negro (14)	Nacional
1990	Rio Negro (15)	Nacional
1991	Nacional (34)	Fast Clube
1992	Sul América (1)	Rio Negro
1993	Sul América (2)	Nacional
1994	América (5)	Nacional
1995	Nacional (35)	Princesa do Solimões
1996	Nacional (36)	Cliper
1997	São Raimundo (3)	Princesa do Solimões
1998	São Raimundo (4)	Rio Negro
1999	São Raimundo (5)	Rio Negro
2000	Nacional (37)	São Raimundo
2001	Rio Negro (16)	Nacional
2002	Nacional (38)	Cliper
2003	Nacional (39)	Rio Negro
2004	São Raimundo (6)	Grêmio Coariense
2005	Grêmio Coariense (1)	Nacional
2006	São Raimundo (7)	Fast Clube
2007	Nacional (40)	Fast Clube
2008	Holanda (1)	Fast Clube
2009	América (6)	Nacional
2010	Penarol (1)	Fast Clube
2011	Penarol (2)	Nacional
2012	Nacional (41)	Fast Clube
2013	Princesa do Solimões (1)	Nacional
2014	Nacional (42)	Princesa do Solimões
2015	Nacional (43)	Princesa do Solimões
2016	Fast Clube (7)	Princesa do Solimões
2017	Manaus (1)	Nacional
2018	Manaus (2)	Fast Clube
2019	Manaus (3)	Fast Clube
2020	Penarol (3)	Manaus
2021	Manaus (4)	São Raimundo
2022	Manaus (5)	Princesa do Solimões
2023	Amazonas (1)	Manauara
2024	Manaus (6)	Amazonas
2025	Amazonas (2)	Nacional
2026	Nacional (44)	Amazonas

== Titles by team ==
Teams in bold stills active.

Rank	Club	Winners	Winning years
1	**Nacional**	44	1916, 1917, 1918, 1919, 1920, 1922, 1923, 1933, 1936, 1937, 1939, 1941, 1942, 1945, 1946, 1950, 1957, 1963, 1964, 1968, 1969, 1972, 1974, 1976, 1977, 1978, 1979, 1980, 1981, 1983, 1984, 1985, 1986, 1991, 1995, 1996, 2000, 2002, 2003, 2007, 2012, 2014, 2015, 2026
2	**Rio Negro**	16	1921, 1927, 1931, 1932, 1938, 1940, 1943, 1962, 1965, 1975, 1982, 1987, 1988, 1989, 1990, 2001
3	**Fast Clube**	7	1948, 1949, 1955, 1960, 1970, 1971, 2016
3	**São Raimundo**	7	1961, 1966, 1997, 1998, 1999, 2004, 2006
5	América	6	1951, 1952, 1953, 1954, 1994, 2009
5	**Manaus**	6	2017, 2018, 2019, 2021, 2022, 2024
7	Olímpico	3	1944, 1947, 1967
7	**Penarol**	3	2010, 2011, 2020
9	**Amazonas**	2	2023, 2025
9	Auto Esporte	2	1956, 1959
9	Cruzeiro do Sul	2	1928, 1930
9	Manaos Athletic	2	1914, 1915
9	Portuguesa	2	1934, 1935
9	**Sul América**	2	1992, 1993
15	Grêmio Coariense	1	2005
15	**Holanda**	1	2008
15	Manaos Sporting	1	1929
15	**Princesa do Solimões**	1	2013
15	Rodoviária	1	1973
15	Santos	1	1958

=== By city ===
City	Championships	Clubs
Manaus	104	Nacional (44), Rio Negro (16), Fast Clube (7), São Raimundo (7), América (6), Manaus (6), Olímpico (3), Amazonas (2), Auto Esporte (2), Cruzeiro do Sul (2), Manaos Athletic (2), Portuguesa (2), Sul América (2), Manaos Sporting (1), Rodoviária (1), Santos (1)
Itacoatiara	3	Penarol (3)
Coari	1	Grêmio Coariense (1)
Manacapuru	1	Princesa do Solimões (1)
Rio Preto da Eva	1	Holanda (1)
