= 2018 Copa do Brasil Second Stage =

The 2018 Copa do Brasil second stage was the second stage of the 2018 Copa do Brasil football competition. It was played from 14 to 22 February 2018. A total of 40 teams competed in the second stage to decide twenty places in the third stage of the 2018 Copa do Brasil.

== Format ==
In the second stage, each tie was played on a single match basis. If tied, extra time would not be played and the penalty shoot-out would be used to determine the winner. Host teams were settled in the first-stage draw.

== Matches ==
All times are Brasília time, BRT (UTC−2 before 18 Feb. and UTC−3 after 18 Feb.)

Team 1	Score	Team 2
Atlético Paranaense (Paraná (state))	5–4	(Santa Catarina (state)) Tubarão
Londrina (Paraná (state))	1–2	Ceará
Remo (Pará)	1–2	(Rio Grande do Sul) Internacional
Criciúma (Santa Catarina (state))	1–1 (4–5 p)	(Paraná (state)) Cianorte
Fluminense (Rio de Janeiro (state))	5–0	(Pernambuco) Salgueiro
Juventude (Rio Grande do Sul)	0–2	(Santa Catarina (state)) Avaí
Uberlândia (Minas Gerais)	0–2	(Paraná (state)) Coritiba
Goiás	0–0 (6–5 p)	(Minas Gerais) Boa Esporte
Ponte Preta (São Paulo (state))	1–0	(São Paulo (state)) Internacional de Limeira
Sampaio Corrêa (Maranhão)	1–0	(Paraná (state)) Paraná
CSA (Alagoas)	0–2	(São Paulo (state)) São Paulo
Novo Hamburgo (Rio Grande do Sul)	1–1 (3–4 p)	(Alagoas) CRB
Vitória (Bahia)	3–0	(Mato Grosso do Sul) Corumbaense
Bragantino (São Paulo (state))	1–0	(Piauí) Altos
Botafogo (Paraíba)	0–4	(Minas Gerais) Atlético Mineiro
Figueirense (Santa Catarina (state))	2–1	(São Paulo (state)) Oeste
Sport (Pernambuco)	3–3 (3–4 p)	(Ceará) Ferroviário
Vila Nova (Goiás)	2–2 (4–2 p)	(Santa Catarina (state)) Joinville
Cuiabá (Mato Grosso)	3–1	(Goiás) Aparecidense
Fluminense de Feira (Bahia)	0–1	(Pernambuco) Náutico

=== Match 41 ===
21 February 2018
19:30

Atlético Paranaense (Paraná (state))	5–4	(Santa Catarina (state)) Tubarão
Bergson 51'; Matheus Rossetto 69'; Guilherme 76' (pen.); Thiago Heleno 90'; Felipe Gedoz 90+2'	Report	Matheus Barbosa 56'; Batista 63'; Lucas Costa 77'; Daniel Costa 84'

Arena da Baixada, Curitiba
Attendance: 8,226
Referee: Eduardo Tomaz de Aquino Valadão (Goiás)

=== Match 42 ===
21 February 2018
19:30

Londrina (Paraná (state))	1–2	Ceará
Carlos Henrique 26'	Report	Juninho 67'; Arthur 90+3'

Estádio do Café, Londrina
Attendance: 1,929
Referee: Elmo Alves Resende Cunha (Goiás)

=== Match 43 ===
21 February 2018
19:30

Remo (Pará)	1–2	(Rio Grande do Sul) Internacional
Felipe Marques 19'	Report	Leandro Damião 25'; Edenílson 30'

Estádio Olímpico do Pará, Belém
Attendance: 13,626
Referee: Marcelo Aparecido Ribeiro de Souza (São Paulo)

=== Match 44 ===
21 February 2018
20:30

Criciúma (Santa Catarina (state))	1–1	(Paraná (state)) Cianorte
Mailson 31'	Report	Rafael Carrilho 13'
Penalties
Alex Maranhão (penalty scored); João Paulo (penalty missed); Luiz Fernando (penalty scored); Mailson (penalty scored); Elvis (penalty scored); Carlos Eduardo (penalty missed)	4–5	(penalty scored) Richarlyson; (penalty missed) Murilo; (penalty scored) Montoya; (penalty scored) Feliphe Gabriel; (penalty scored) André Luis; (penalty scored) Arroyo

Estádio Heriberto Hülse, Criciúma
Attendance: 2,567
Referee: Diego Pombo Lopez (Bahia)

=== Match 45 ===
15 February 2018
19:15

Fluminense (Rio de Janeiro (state))	5–0	(Pernambuco) Salgueiro
Gilberto 6', 54'; Marcos Júnior 19'; Robinho 66'; Sornoza 87'	Report

Estádio Olímpico Nilton Santos, Rio de Janeiro
Attendance: 2,930
Referee: Jean Pierre Gonçalves Lima (Rio Grande do Sul)

=== Match 46 ===
22 February 2018
19:15

Juventude (Rio Grande do Sul)	0–2	(Santa Catarina (state)) Avaí
	Report	Marquinhos 67'; Rômulo 72'

Estádio Alfredo Jaconi, Caxias do Sul
Attendance: 3,641
Referee: Cláudio Francisco Lima e Silva (Sergipe)

=== Match 47 ===
22 February 2018
21:30

Uberlândia (Minas Gerais)	0–2	(Paraná (state)) Coritiba
	Report	Rafael Estevam 30' (o.g.); Julio Rusch 56'

Estádio Parque do Sabiá, Uberlândia
Attendance: 4,749
Referee: Vinicius Gonçalves Dias Araújo (São Paulo)

=== Match 48 ===
21 February 2018
20:30

Goiás	0–0	(Minas Gerais) Boa Esporte
	Report
Penalties
Giovanni (penalty scored); Caíque Sá (penalty scored); Eduardo Brock (penalty missed); Maranhão (penalty scored); Léo Sena (penalty missed); Júnior Viçosa (penalty scored); Jefferson (penalty scored); David Duarte (penalty scored)	6–5	(penalty scored) Christianno; (penalty missed) Gabriel Pereira; (penalty missed) Igor Ribeiro; (penalty scored) Alyson; (penalty scored) Sapé; (penalty scored) Caíque; (penalty scored) Amaral; (penalty missed) Lucas Hulk

Estádio Serra Dourada, Goiânia
Attendance: 9,901
Referee: Rodrigo D'Alonso Ferreira (Santa Catarina)

=== Match 49 ===
21 February 2018
21:45

Ponte Preta (São Paulo (state))	1–0	(São Paulo (state)) Internacional de Limeira
Yuri 63'	Report

Estádio Moisés Lucarelli, Campinas
Attendance: 2,902
Referee: Rodrigo Guarizo Ferreira do Amaral (São Paulo)

=== Match 50 ===
22 February 2018
21:30

Sampaio Corrêa (Maranhão)	1–0	(Paraná (state)) Paraná
Uilliam 74' (pen.)	Report

Castelão, São Luís
Attendance: 5,690
Referee: Emerson de Almeida Ferreira (Minas Gerais)

=== Match 51 ===
15 February 2018
21:30

CSA (Alagoas)	0–2	(São Paulo (state)) São Paulo
	Report	Nenê 48'; Cueva 61' (pen.)

Estádio Rei Pelé, Maceió
Attendance: 16,270
Referee: Bráulio da Silva Machado (Santa Catarina)

=== Match 52 ===
15 February 2018
21:30

Novo Hamburgo (Rio Grande do Sul)	1–1	(Alagoas) CRB
Ricardo Lobo 74'	Report	Neto Baiano 45+1'
Penalties
Ricardo Lobo (penalty scored); Zotti (penalty missed); Júlio Santos (penalty scored); Branquinho (penalty scored); Assis (penalty missed)	3–4	(penalty scored) Rafael Bastos; (penalty scored) Diego; (penalty scored) Ayrton; (penalty scored) Willians

Estádio do Vale, Novo Hamburgo
Attendance: 831
Referee: Jailson Macêdo Freitas (Bahia)

=== Match 53 ===
15 February 2018
19:15

Vitória (Bahia)	3–0	(Mato Grosso do Sul) Corumbaense
Yago 33'; André Lima 52'; Jonatas Belusso 83'	Report

Barradão, Salvador
Attendance: 3,641
Referee: Dyorgines José Padovani de Andrade (Espírito Santo)

=== Match 54 ===
21 February 2018
20:30

Bragantino (São Paulo (state))	1–0	(Piauí) Altos
Léo Jaime 90+3'	Report

Estádio Nabi Abi Chedid, Bragança Paulista
Attendance: 2,798
Referee: Daniel Nobre Bins (Rio Grande do Sul)

=== Match 55 ===
21 February 2018
21:45

Botafogo (Paraíba)	0–4	(Minas Gerais) Atlético Mineiro
	Report	Róger Guedes 27'; Cazares 61'; Ricardo Oliveira 66'; Luan 81'

Almeidão, João Pessoa
Attendance: 11,740
Referee: Rafael Traci (Paraná)

=== Match 56 ===
21 February 2018
20:30

Figueirense (Santa Catarina (state))	2–1	(São Paulo (state)) Oeste
André Luis 19'; Cleberson 90+1'	Report	Raphael Luz 29'

Estádio Orlando Scarpelli, Florianópolis
Attendance: 4,285
Referee: Antônio Dib Moraes de Sousa (Piauí)

=== Match 57 ===
15 February 2018
19:15

Sport (Pernambuco)	3–3	(Ceará) Ferroviário
Anselmo 38'; Fabrício 55'; Marlone 71'	Report	Mazinho 76', 82'; Valdeci 86'
Penalties
Thomás (penalty scored); Léo Ortiz (penalty scored); Fabrício (penalty scored); Rogério (penalty missed); Marlone (penalty missed)	3–4	(penalty scored) Janeudo; (penalty scored) Valdeci; (penalty scored) Rodrigo Rodrigues; (penalty scored) Mazinho; (penalty missed) Mota

Estádio Ilha do Retiro, Recife
Attendance: 3,238
Referee: Rodrigo Batista Raposo (Distrito Federal)

=== Match 58 ===
22 February 2018
19:15

Vila Nova (Goiás)	2–2	(Santa Catarina (state)) Joinville
Keké 74'; Ramon 86'	Report	Evaldo 51'; Rafael Grampola 70'
Penalties
Ramon (penalty scored); Reis (penalty scored); Filgueira (penalty scored); Keké (penalty scored)	4–2	(penalty scored) Rafael Grampola; (penalty missed) Lázio; (penalty missed) Gustavo; (penalty scored) Murilo Rangel

Estádio Serra Dourada, Goiânia
Attendance: 12,186
Referee: Marielson Alves Silva (Bahia)

=== Match 59 ===
21 February 2018
21:30

Cuiabá (Mato Grosso)	3–1	(Goiás) Aparecidense
Magno 60'; Weverton 79', 86'	Report	Nonato 39'

Arena Pantanal, Cuiabá
Attendance: 864
Referee: Sávio Pereira Sampaio (Distrito Federal)

=== Match 60 ===
14 February 2018
22:30

Fluminense de Feira (Bahia)	0–1	(Pernambuco) Náutico
	Report	Wallace Pernambucano 27'

Estádio Joia da Princesa, Feira de Santana
Attendance: 3,968
Referee: Renan Roberto de Souza (Paraíba)
