= Weverson =

Weverson may refer to:

- Weverson (footballer, born 1987), full name Weverson Eron Maldonado Saffiotti, Brazilian football goalkeeper
- Weverson (footballer, born 1988), full name Weverson Patrick Rodrigues de Oliveira, Brazilian football midfielder
- Weverson (footballer, born 2000), full name Weverson Moreira da Costa, Brazilian football defender

== See also ==
- Weverton (disambiguation)
