= 2018 Copa do Brasil Fourth Stage =

The 2018 Copa do Brasil fourth stage was the fourth stage of the 2018 Copa do Brasil football competition. It was played from 4 to 19 April 2018. A total of 10 teams competed in the fourth stage to decide five places in the final stages of the 2018 Copa do Brasil.

== Draw ==
The draw for the fourth stage was held on 19 March 2018, 11:00 at CBF headquarters in Rio de Janeiro. The 10 qualified teams were in a single group (CBF ranking shown in parentheses).

Group
- (Minas Gerais) Atlético Mineiro (5)
- (Paraná (state)) Atlético Paranaense (9)
- (Rio Grande do Sul) Internacional (10)
- (São Paulo (state)) São Paulo (11)
- (São Paulo (state)) Ponte Preta (16)
- (Bahia) Vitória (18)
- Goiás (22)
- (Santa Catarina (state)) Avaí (23)
- (Pernambuco) Náutico (32)
- (Ceará) Ferroviário (no rank)

== Format ==
In the fourth stage, each tie was played on a home-and-away two-legged basis. If tied on aggregate, the away goals rule would not be used, extra time would not be played and the penalty shoot-out would be used to determine the winner.

== Matches ==
All times are Brasília time, BRT (UTC−3)

Team 1	Agg.	Team 2	1st leg	2nd leg
Ponte Preta (São Paulo (state))	3–1	(Pernambuco) Náutico	3–0	0–1
Atlético Paranaense (Paraná (state))	4–3	(São Paulo (state)) São Paulo	2–1	2–2
Avaí (Santa Catarina (state))	2–4	Goiás	2–2	0–2
Internacional (Rio Grande do Sul)	2–2 (3–4 p)	(Bahia) Vitória	2–1	0–1
Atlético Mineiro (Minas Gerais)	6–2	(Ceará) Ferroviário	4–0	2–2

=== Match 71 ===
11 April 2018
21:45

Ponte Preta (São Paulo (state))	3–0	(Pernambuco) Náutico
Orinho 15'; Felipe Saraiva 20'; Júnior Santos 26'	Report

Estádio Moisés Lucarelli, Campinas
Attendance: 3,541
Referee: Daniel Nobre Bins (Rio Grande do Sul)

18 April 2018
21:45

Náutico (Pernambuco)	1–0	(São Paulo (state)) Ponte Preta
Júnior Timbó 82' (pen.)	Report

Arena Pernambuco, São Lourenço da Mata
Attendance: 1,347
Referee: Alisson Sidnei Furtado (Tocantins)

Ponte Preta won 3–1 on aggregate and advanced to the round of 16.

=== Match 72 ===
4 April 2018
21:45

Atlético Paranaense (Paraná (state))	2–1	(São Paulo (state)) São Paulo
Pablo 23'; Paulo André 60'	Report	Tréllez 63'

Arena da Baixada, Curitiba
Attendance: 22,865
Referee: Cláudio Francisco Lima e Silva (Sergipe)

19 April 2018
19:15

São Paulo (São Paulo (state))	2–2	(Paraná (state)) Atlético Paranaense
Valdívia 25'; Nenê 34'	Report	Guilherme 40' (pen.); Matheus Rossetto 51'

Estádio do Morumbi, São Paulo
Attendance: 27,812
Referee: Wagner do Nascimento Magalhães (Rio de Janeiro)

Atlético Paranaense won 4–3 on aggregate and advanced to the round of 16.

=== Match 73 ===
11 April 2018
19:30

Avaí (Santa Catarina (state))	2–2	Goiás
Rômulo 87'; Rodrigão 90+2'	Report	Breno 73'; Júnior Viçosa 89'

Estádio da Ressacada, Florianópolis
Attendance: 7,657
Referee: Bruno Arleu de Araújo (Rio de Janeiro)

18 April 2018
19:30

Goiás	2–0	(Santa Catarina (state)) Avaí
Giovanni 36' (pen.); Carlos Eduardo 81'	Report

Estádio Serra Dourada, Goiânia
Attendance: 21,262
Referee: Vinicius Gonçalves Dias Araújo (São Paulo)

Goiás won 4–2 on aggregate and advanced to the round of 16.

=== Match 74 ===
11 April 2018
19:30

Internacional (Rio Grande do Sul)	2–1	(Bahia) Vitória
Patrick 18'; D'Alessandro 90+2'	Report	Denílson 42'

Estádio Beira-Rio, Porto Alegre
Attendance: 17,525
Referee: Flávio Rodrigues de Souza (São Paulo)

19 April 2018
19:15

Vitória (Bahia)	1–0	(Rio Grande do Sul) Internacional
Neílton 80' (pen.)	Report
Penalties
Denílson (penalty scored); Nickson (penalty missed); Uillian Correia (penalty scored); José Welison (penalty scored); Neílton (penalty scored)	4–3	(penalty scored) Camilo; (penalty missed) López; (penalty missed) Gabriel Dias; (penalty scored) Fabiano; (penalty scored) Patrick

Barradão, Salvador
Attendance: 5,878
Referee: Rafael Traci (Paraná)

Tied 2–2 on aggregate, Vitória won on penalties and advanced to the round of 16.

=== Match 75 ===
4 April 2018
19:30

Atlético Mineiro (Minas Gerais)	4–0	(Ceará) Ferroviário
Ricardo Oliveira 1'; Otero 28', 39'; Erik Lima 49'	Report

Estádio Independência, Belo Horizonte
Attendance: 13,932
Referee: Vinícius Furlan (São Paulo)

18 April 2018
21:45

Ferroviário (Ceará)	2–2	(Minas Gerais) Atlético Mineiro
Esquerdinha 24'; Mazinho 37'	Report	Róger Guedes 51'; Gustavo Blanco 73'

Castelão, Fortaleza
Attendance: 1,171
Referee: Pathrice Wallace Corrêa Maia (Rio de Janeiro)

Atlético Mineiro won 6–2 on aggregate and advanced to the round of 16.
