= 2018 Copa do Brasil =

Tournament details
- Country: Brazil
- Dates: 30 January - 17 October
- Teams: 91

Final positions
- Champions: Cruzeiro (6th title)
- Runners-up: Corinthians
- 2019 Copa Libertadores: Cruzeiro

Tournament statistics
- Matches played: 120
- Goals scored: 253 (2.11 per match)
- Top goal scorer(s): Gabriel; Neílton; Rômulo (4 goals each)

Awards
- Best player: Jádson (Corinthians)

The 2018 Copa do Brasil (officially the Copa Continental Pneus do Brasil 2018 for sponsorship reasons) was the 30th edition of the Copa do Brasil football competition. It was held between 30 January and 17 October 2018. The competition was contested by 91 teams, which qualified either by participating in their respective state championships (70), by the 2018 CBF ranking (10), by the 2017 Copa do Nordeste (1), by the 2017 Copa Verde (1), by the 2017 Série B (1) or by qualifying for the 2018 Copa Libertadores (8).

Cruzeiro were the defending champions. They successfully defended their title, winning the finals 3–1 on aggregate against Corinthians for their 6th title. As champions, Cruzeiro qualified for the 2019 Copa Libertadores Group stage and the 2019 Copa do Brasil Round of 16.

Jádson (Corinthians) and Cássio (Corinthians) won best player and best goalkeeper awards, respectively.

== Format ==
The competition was a single elimination knockout tournament, the first two stages featuring a single match and the other stages featuring two-legged ties. Eleven teams qualified for the Round of 16 (the that teams qualified for the 2018 Copa Libertadores (8), Série B champions, Copa Verde champions and Copa do Nordeste champions). The remaining 80 teams played the first stage. The 40 winners played the second stage, the 20 winners played the third stage, the 10 winners played the fourth stage. The five fourth-stage winners qualified for the Round of 16.

In this season, the away goals rule was not to be used in any stage.

== Qualified teams ==
Teams in bold are qualified directly for the round of 16.

Association	Team	Qualification method
(Acre (state)) Acre; 2 berths	Atlético Acreano	2017 Campeonato Acriano champions
(Acre (state)) Acre; 2 berths	Rio Branco	2017 Campeonato Acriano runners-up
(Alagoas) Alagoas; 3 berths	CRB	2017 Campeonato Alagoano champions
(Alagoas) Alagoas; 3 berths	CSA	2017 Campeonato Alagoano runners-up
(Alagoas) Alagoas; 3 berths	ASA	2017 Campeonato Alagoano 3rd place
(Amapá) Amapá; 1 berth	Santos	2017 Campeonato Amapaense champions
(Amazonas (Brazilian state)) Amazonas; 2 berths	Manaus	2017 Campeonato Amazonense champions
(Amazonas (Brazilian state)) Amazonas; 2 berths	Nacional	2017 Campeonato Amazonense runners-up
(Bahia) Bahia; 3 + 1 berths	**Bahia**	**2017 Copa do Nordeste champions**
(Bahia) Bahia; 3 + 1 berths	Vitória	2017 Campeonato Baiano champions
(Bahia) Bahia; 3 + 1 berths	Fluminense de Feira	2017 Campeonato Baiano 3rd place
(Bahia) Bahia; 3 + 1 berths	Vitória da Conquista	2017 Campeonato Baiano 4th place
(Ceará) Ceará; 3 berths	Ceará	2017 Campeonato Cearense champions
(Ceará) Ceará; 3 berths	Ferroviário	2017 Campeonato Cearense runners-up
(Ceará) Ceará; 3 berths	Floresta	2017 Copa Fares Lopes champions
(Espírito Santo) Espírito Santo; 1 berth	Atlético Itapemirim	2017 Campeonato Capixaba champions
(Federal District (Brazil)) Federal District; 2 berths	Brasiliense	2017 Campeonato Brasiliense champions
(Federal District (Brazil)) Federal District; 2 berths	Ceilândia	2017 Campeonato Brasiliense runners-up
(Goiás) Goiás; 3 + 1 berths	Goiás	2017 Campeonato Goiano champions
(Goiás) Goiás; 3 + 1 berths	Vila Nova	2017 Campeonato Goiano runners-up
(Goiás) Goiás; 3 + 1 berths	Aparecidense	2017 Campeonato Goiano 3rd place
(Goiás) Goiás; 3 + 1 berths	Atlético Goianiense	2nd best placed team in the 2017 CBF ranking not already qualified
(Maranhão) Maranhão; 2 berths	Sampaio Corrêa	2017 Campeonato Maranhense champions
(Maranhão) Maranhão; 2 berths	Cordino	2017 Campeonato Maranhense runners-up
(Mato Grosso) Mato Grosso; 3 + 1 berths	**Luverdense**	**2017 Copa Verde champions**
(Mato Grosso) Mato Grosso; 3 + 1 berths	Cuiabá	2017 Campeonato Mato-Grossense champions
(Mato Grosso) Mato Grosso; 3 + 1 berths	Sinop	2017 Campeonato Mato-Grossense runners-up
(Mato Grosso) Mato Grosso; 3 + 1 berths	União Rondonópolis^{[a]}	2017 Copa FMF champions
Mato Grosso do Sul 2 berths	Corumbaense	2017 Campeonato Sul-Mato-Grossense champions
Mato Grosso do Sul 2 berths	Novoperário	2017 Campeonato Sul-Mato-Grossense runners-up
(Minas Gerais) Minas Gerais; 4 + 2 + 1 berths	**Cruzeiro**	**2017 Copa do Brasil champions**
(Minas Gerais) Minas Gerais; 4 + 2 + 1 berths	**América Mineiro**	**2017 Campeonato Brasileiro Série B champions**
(Minas Gerais) Minas Gerais; 4 + 2 + 1 berths	Atlético Mineiro	2017 Campeonato Mineiro champions
(Minas Gerais) Minas Gerais; 4 + 2 + 1 berths	URT	2017 Campeonato Mineiro 4th place
(Minas Gerais) Minas Gerais; 4 + 2 + 1 berths	Caldense	2017 Campeonato Mineiro 5th place
(Minas Gerais) Minas Gerais; 4 + 2 + 1 berths	Uberlândia	2017 Campeonato Mineiro 6th place
(Minas Gerais) Minas Gerais; 4 + 2 + 1 berths	Boa Esporte	9th best placed team in the 2017 CBF ranking not already qualified
(Pará) Pará; 3 berths	Paysandu	2017 Campeonato Paraense champions
(Pará) Pará; 3 berths	Remo	2017 Campeonato Paraense runners-up
(Pará) Pará; 3 berths	Independente	2017 Campeonato Paraense 3rd place
(Paraíba) Paraíba; 2 berths	Botafogo	2017 Campeonato Paraibano champions
(Paraíba) Paraíba; 2 berths	Treze	2017 Campeonato Paraibano runners-up
(Paraná (state)) Paraná; 3 + 2 berths	Coritiba	2017 Campeonato Paranaense champions
(Paraná (state)) Paraná; 3 + 2 berths	Atlético Paranaense	2017 Campeonato Paranaense runners-up
(Paraná (state)) Paraná; 3 + 2 berths	Cianorte	2017 Campeonato Paranaense 3rd place
(Paraná (state)) Paraná; 3 + 2 berths	Paraná	3rd best placed team in the 2017 CBF ranking not already qualified
(Paraná (state)) Paraná; 3 + 2 berths	Londrina	10th best placed team in the 2017 CBF ranking not already qualified
(Pernambuco) Pernambuco; 3 + 1 berths	Sport	2017 Campeonato Pernambucano champions
(Pernambuco) Pernambuco; 3 + 1 berths	Salgueiro	2017 Campeonato Pernambucano runners-up
(Pernambuco) Pernambuco; 3 + 1 berths	Santa Cruz	2017 Campeonato Pernambucano 3rd place
(Pernambuco) Pernambuco; 3 + 1 berths	Náutico	5th best placed team in the 2017 CBF ranking not already qualified
(Piauí) Piauí; 2 berths	Altos	2017 Campeonato Piauiense champions
(Piauí) Piauí; 2 berths	Parnahyba	2017 Campeonato Piauiense runners-up
(Rio de Janeiro (state)) Rio de Janeiro; 5 + 2 berths	**Flamengo**	**2017 Campeonato Brasileiro Série A 6th place**
(Rio de Janeiro (state)) Rio de Janeiro; 5 + 2 berths	**Vasco da Gama**	**2017 Campeonato Brasileiro Série A 7th place**
(Rio de Janeiro (state)) Rio de Janeiro; 5 + 2 berths	Fluminense	2017 Campeonato Carioca runners-up
(Rio de Janeiro (state)) Rio de Janeiro; 5 + 2 berths	Botafogo	2017 Campeonato Carioca 4th place
(Rio de Janeiro (state)) Rio de Janeiro; 5 + 2 berths	Nova Iguaçu	2017 Campeonato Carioca 5th place
(Rio de Janeiro (state)) Rio de Janeiro; 5 + 2 berths	Madureira	2017 Campeonato Carioca 6th place
(Rio de Janeiro (state)) Rio de Janeiro; 5 + 2 berths	Boavista	2017 Copa Rio champions
Rio Grande do Norte 3 berths	ABC	2017 Campeonato Potiguar champions
Rio Grande do Norte 3 berths	Globo	2017 Campeonato Potiguar runners-up
Rio Grande do Norte 3 berths	América de Natal	2017 Campeonato Potiguar 3rd place
(Rio Grande do Sul) Rio Grande do Sul; 4 + 1 + 1 berths	**Grêmio**	**2017 Copa Libertadores champions**
(Rio Grande do Sul) Rio Grande do Sul; 4 + 1 + 1 berths	Novo Hamburgo	2017 Campeonato Gaúcho champions
(Rio Grande do Sul) Rio Grande do Sul; 4 + 1 + 1 berths	Internacional	2017 Campeonato Gaúcho runners-up
(Rio Grande do Sul) Rio Grande do Sul; 4 + 1 + 1 berths	Caxias	2017 Campeonato Gaúcho 3rd place
(Rio Grande do Sul) Rio Grande do Sul; 4 + 1 + 1 berths	Aimoré	2017 Copa FGF runners-up
(Rio Grande do Sul) Rio Grande do Sul; 4 + 1 + 1 berths	Juventude	6th best placed team in the 2017 CBF ranking not already qualified
(Rondônia) Rondônia; 1 berth	Real Ariquemes	2017 Campeonato Rondoniense champions
(Roraima) Roraima; 1 berth	São Raimundo	2017 Campeonato Roraimense champions
(Santa Catarina (state)) Santa Catarina; 4 + 1 + 2 berths	**Chapecoense**	**2017 Campeonato Brasileiro Série A 8th place**
(Santa Catarina (state)) Santa Catarina; 4 + 1 + 2 berths	Avaí	2017 Campeonato Catarinense runners-up
(Santa Catarina (state)) Santa Catarina; 4 + 1 + 2 berths	Criciúma	2017 Campeonato Catarinense 3rd place
(Santa Catarina (state)) Santa Catarina; 4 + 1 + 2 berths	Brusque	2017 Campeonato Catarinense 4th place
(Santa Catarina (state)) Santa Catarina; 4 + 1 + 2 berths	Tubarão	2017 Copa Santa Catarina champions
(Santa Catarina (state)) Santa Catarina; 4 + 1 + 2 berths	Figueirense	best placed team in the 2017 CBF ranking not already qualified
(Santa Catarina (state)) Santa Catarina; 4 + 1 + 2 berths	Joinville	4th best placed team in the 2017 CBF ranking not already qualified
(São Paulo (state)) São Paulo; 5 + 3 + 2 berths	**Corinthians**	**2017 Campeonato Brasileiro Série A champions**
(São Paulo (state)) São Paulo; 5 + 3 + 2 berths	**Palmeiras**	**2017 Campeonato Brasileiro Série A runners-up**
(São Paulo (state)) São Paulo; 5 + 3 + 2 berths	**Santos**	**2017 Campeonato Brasileiro Série A 3rd place**
(São Paulo (state)) São Paulo; 5 + 3 + 2 berths	Ponte Preta	2017 Campeonato Paulista runners-up
(São Paulo (state)) São Paulo; 5 + 3 + 2 berths	São Paulo	2017 Campeonato Paulista 4th place
(São Paulo (state)) São Paulo; 5 + 3 + 2 berths	Ituano	2017 Campeonato Paulista do Interior champions
(São Paulo (state)) São Paulo; 5 + 3 + 2 berths	São Caetano	2017 Campeonato Paulista Série A2 champions
(São Paulo (state)) São Paulo; 5 + 3 + 2 berths	Internacional de Limeira	2017 Copa Paulista runners-up
(São Paulo (state)) São Paulo; 5 + 3 + 2 berths	Bragantino	7th best placed team in the 2017 CBF ranking not already qualified
(São Paulo (state)) São Paulo; 5 + 3 + 2 berths	Oeste	8th best placed team in the 2017 CBF ranking not already qualified
(Sergipe) Sergipe; 2 berths	Confiança	2017 Campeonato Sergipano champions
(Sergipe) Sergipe; 2 berths	Itabaiana	2017 Campeonato Sergipano runners-up
(Tocantins) Tocantins; 1 berth	Interporto	2017 Campeonato Tocantinense champions

^{a} Originally Dom Bosco qualified as 2017 Copa FMF runners-up. Two months after the ending of the Copa FMF, Superior Tribunal de Justiça Desportiva (STJD) gave back 9 points deducted to União Rondonópolis in the first stage. With the 9 points, União Rondonópolis finished fourth and qualified for the 2017 Copa FMF semi-finals instead of Mixto. The previous semi-finals, Dom Bosco v Mixto, were annulled and União Rondonópolis played new semi-finals against Dom Bosco. União Rondonópolis won on penalties and advanced to the finals earning the right to play in the 2018 Copa do Brasil.

== Schedule ==
The schedule of the competition was as follows.

Stage	First leg	Second leg
First stage	Week 1: 31 January 2018; Week 2: 7 February 2018	
Second stage	Week 1: 14 February 2018; Week 2: 21 February 2018	
Third stage	28 February 2018	14 March 2018
Fourth stage	4 and 11 April 2018	18 April 2018
Round of 16	25 April, 2, 9 and 16 May 2018	9, 16, 23 May and 16 July 2018
Quarterfinals	1 August 2018	15 August 2018
Semifinals	12 September 2018	26 September 2018
Finals	10 October 2018	17 October 2018

== Draw ==
The draw for the first and second stage was held on 15 December 2017, 15:00 at CBF headquarters in Rio de Janeiro. Teams were seeded by their CBF ranking (shown in parentheses). The 80 qualified teams were divided in eight groups (A-H) with 10 teams each. The matches were drawn from the respective confronts: A vs. E; B vs. F; C vs. G; D vs. H. The lower ranked teams hosted the first stage match.

Group A	Group B	Group C	Group D
(Minas Gerais) Atlético Mineiro (5); (Rio de Janeiro (state)) Botafogo (8); (Paraná (state)) Atlético Paranaense (9); (Rio Grande do Sul) Internacional (10); (São Paulo (state)) São Paulo (11); (Rio de Janeiro (state)) Fluminense (12); (Pernambuco) Sport (15); (São Paulo (state)) Ponte Preta (16); (Paraná (state)) Coritiba (17); (Bahia) Vitória (18)	(Santa Catarina (state)) Figueirense (19); (Goiás) Atlético Goianiense (20); Goiás (22); (Santa Catarina (state)) Avaí (23); (Pernambuco) Santa Cruz (25); (Pará) Paysandu (26); Ceará (27); (Paraná (state)) Paraná (28); (Santa Catarina (state)) Criciúma (29); (Santa Catarina (state)) Joinville (30)	(Rio Grande do Norte) ABC (31); (Pernambuco) Náutico (32); (Rio Grande do Sul) Juventude (33); (São Paulo (state)) Bragantino (35); (Alagoas) CRB (36); (São Paulo (state)) Oeste (37); (Minas Gerais) Boa Esporte (38); (Maranhão) Sampaio Corrêa (39); (Paraná (state)) Londrina (40); (Goiás) Vila Nova (41)	(Rio Grande do Norte) América de Natal (43); (Paraíba) Botafogo (45); (Alagoas) ASA (47); (Mato Grosso) Cuiabá (50); (Pernambuco) Salgueiro (51); (Sergipe) Confiança (54); (Pará) Remo (57); (Alagoas) CSA (59); (Acre (state)) Rio Branco (64); (São Paulo (state)) Ituano (65)
Group E	Group F	Group G	Group H
(Rio Grande do Norte) Globo (67); (Amapá) Santos (69); (Rio Grande do Sul) Caxias (71); (Rio de Janeiro (state)) Madureira (72); (Minas Gerais) Caldense (74); (Rio de Janeiro (state)) Boavista (76); (Goiás) Aparecidense (78); (Amazonas (Brazilian state)) Nacional (80); (Acre (state)) Atlético Acreano (81); (Piauí) Parnahyba (92)	(São Paulo (state)) São Caetano (93); (Rio Grande do Sul) Novo Hamburgo (96); (Federal District (Brazil)) Ceilândia (97); (Piauí) Altos (98); (Minas Gerais) URT (101); (Paraíba) Treze (102); (Sergipe) Itabaiana (104); (Santa Catarina (state)) Brusque (108); (Mato Grosso) Sinop (110); (Bahia) Fluminense de Feira (118)	(Roraima) São Raimundo (121); (Bahia) Vitória da Conquista (122); (Federal District (Brazil)) Brasiliense (145); (Maranhão) Cordino (157); (Rondônia) Real Ariquemes (157); (Mato Grosso) União Rondonópolis^{[1]} (157); (Pará) Independente (166); (Tocantins) Interporto (167); (Rio de Janeiro (state)) Nova Iguaçu (201); (Paraná (state)) Cianorte (205)	(São Paulo (state)) Internacional de Limeira (no rank); (Minas Gerais) Uberlândia (no rank); (Rio Grande do Sul) Aimoré (no rank); (Santa Catarina (state)) Tubarão (no rank); (Ceará) Ferroviário (no rank); (Ceará) Floresta (no rank); (Amazonas (Brazilian state)) Manaus (no rank); (Mato Grosso do Sul) Corumbaense (no rank); (Mato Grosso do Sul) Novoperário (no rank); (Espírito Santo) Atlético Itapemirim (no rank)

^{1} At the time of the draw, Dom Bosco (172).

== First stage ==
In the first stage, each tie was played on a single match basis. The lower CBF ranked team hosted the match. If tied, the higher CBF ranked team would advance to second stage.

Team 1	Score	Team 2
Caxias (Rio Grande do Sul)	0–0	(Paraná (state)) Atlético Paranaense
Tubarão (Santa Catarina (state))	2–0	(Rio Grande do Norte) América de Natal
Brusque (Santa Catarina (state))	0–1	Ceará
Real Ariquemes (Rondônia)	0–1	(Paraná (state)) Londrina
Boavista (Rio de Janeiro (state))	1–1	(Rio Grande do Sul) Internacional
Atlético Itapemirim (Espírito Santo)	0–2	(Pará) Remo
São Caetano (São Paulo (state))	1–1	(Santa Catarina (state)) Criciúma
Cianorte (Paraná (state))	2–0	(Rio Grande do Norte) ABC
Caldense (Minas Gerais)	0–1	(Rio de Janeiro (state)) Fluminense
Novoperário (Mato Grosso do Sul)	2–3	(Pernambuco) Salgueiro
Ceilândia (Federal District (Brazil))	2–3	(Santa Catarina (state)) Avaí
Interporto (Tocantins)	0–0	(Rio Grande do Sul) Juventude
Parnahyba (Piauí)	1–1	(Paraná (state)) Coritiba
Uberlândia (Minas Gerais)	2–0	(São Paulo (state)) Ituano
Sinop (Mato Grosso)	0–1	Goiás
Vitória da Conquista (Bahia)	0–0	(Minas Gerais) Boa Esporte
Nacional (Amazonas (Brazilian state))	0–0	(São Paulo (state)) Ponte Preta
Internacional de Limeira (São Paulo (state))	1–0	(Acre (state)) Rio Branco
URT (Minas Gerais)	1–1	(Paraná (state)) Paraná
Independente (Pará)	0–1	(Maranhão) Sampaio Corrêa
Madureira (Rio de Janeiro (state))	0–1	(São Paulo (state)) São Paulo
Manaus (Amazonas (Brazilian state))	2–2	(Alagoas) CSA
Novo Hamburgo (Rio Grande do Sul)	2–1	(Pará) Paysandu
União Rondonópolis (Mato Grosso)	1–3	(Alagoas) CRB
Globo (Rio Grande do Norte)	0–2	(Bahia) Vitória
Corumbaense (Mato Grosso do Sul)	1–0	(Alagoas) ASA
Altos (Piauí)	2–1	(Goiás) Atlético Goianiense
Nova Iguaçu (Rio de Janeiro (state))	1–1	(São Paulo (state)) Bragantino
Atlético Acreano (Acre (state))	1–1	(Minas Gerais) Atlético Mineiro
Floresta (Ceará)	0–2	(Paraíba) Botafogo
Treze (Paraíba)	0–2	(Santa Catarina (state)) Figueirense
Brasiliense (Federal District (Brazil))	1–1	(São Paulo (state)) Oeste
Santos (Amapá)	1–2	(Pernambuco) Sport
Ferroviário (Ceará)	2–1	(Sergipe) Confiança
Itabaiana (Sergipe)	0–1	(Santa Catarina (state)) Joinville
São Raimundo (Roraima)	0–1	(Goiás) Vila Nova
Aparecidense (Goiás)	2–1	(Rio de Janeiro (state)) Botafogo
Aimoré (Rio Grande do Sul)	1–2	(Mato Grosso) Cuiabá
Fluminense de Feira (Bahia)	2–0	(Pernambuco) Santa Cruz
Cordino (Maranhão)	1–1	(Pernambuco) Náutico

== Second stage ==
In the second stage, each tie was played on a single match basis. If tied, extra time would not be played and the penalty shoot-out would be used to determine the winner.

Team 1	Score	Team 2
Atlético Paranaense (Paraná (state))	5–4	(Santa Catarina (state)) Tubarão
Londrina (Paraná (state))	1–2	Ceará
Remo (Pará)	1–2	(Rio Grande do Sul) Internacional
Criciúma (Santa Catarina (state))	1–1 (4–5 p)	(Paraná (state)) Cianorte
Fluminense (Rio de Janeiro (state))	5–0	(Pernambuco) Salgueiro
Juventude (Rio Grande do Sul)	0–2	(Santa Catarina (state)) Avaí
Uberlândia (Minas Gerais)	0–2	(Paraná (state)) Coritiba
Goiás	0–0 (6–5 p)	(Minas Gerais) Boa Esporte
Ponte Preta (São Paulo (state))	1–0	(São Paulo (state)) Internacional de Limeira
Sampaio Corrêa (Maranhão)	1–0	(Paraná (state)) Paraná
CSA (Alagoas)	0–2	(São Paulo (state)) São Paulo
Novo Hamburgo (Rio Grande do Sul)	1–1 (3–4 p)	(Alagoas) CRB
Vitória (Bahia)	3–0	(Mato Grosso do Sul) Corumbaense
Bragantino (São Paulo (state))	1–0	(Piauí) Altos
Botafogo (Paraíba)	0–4	(Minas Gerais) Atlético Mineiro
Figueirense (Santa Catarina (state))	2–1	(São Paulo (state)) Oeste
Sport (Pernambuco)	3–3 (3–4 p)	(Ceará) Ferroviário
Vila Nova (Goiás)	2–2 (4–2 p)	(Santa Catarina (state)) Joinville
Cuiabá (Mato Grosso)	3–1	(Goiás) Aparecidense
Fluminense de Feira (Bahia)	0–1	(Pernambuco) Náutico

== Third stage ==
In the third stage, each tie was played on a home-and-away two-legged basis. If tied on aggregate, the away goals rule would not be used, extra time would not be played and the penalty shoot-out would be used to determine the winner.

Team 1	Agg.	Team 2	1st leg	2nd leg
Atlético Paranaense (Paraná (state))	1–1 (6–5 p)	Ceará	0–0	1–1
Internacional (Rio Grande do Sul)	4–0	(Paraná (state)) Cianorte	2–0	2–0
Fluminense (Rio de Janeiro (state))	1–3	(Santa Catarina (state)) Avaí	1–2	0–1
Goiás	2–1	(Paraná (state)) Coritiba	1–0	1–1
Ponte Preta (São Paulo (state))	0–0 (5–3 p)	(Maranhão) Sampaio Corrêa	0–0	0–0
São Paulo (São Paulo (state))	5–0	(Alagoas) CRB	2–0	3–0
Bragantino (São Paulo (state))	1–3	(Bahia) Vitória	1–0	0–3
Figueirense (Santa Catarina (state))	2–2 (2–4 p)	(Minas Gerais) Atlético Mineiro	0–1	2–1
Ferroviário (Ceará)	2–1	(Goiás) Vila Nova	1–1	1–0
Náutico (Pernambuco)	3–1	(Mato Grosso) Cuiabá	2–1	1–0

== Fourth stage ==
The draw for the fourth stage was held on 19 March 2018, 11:00 at CBF headquarters in Rio de Janeiro. The 10 qualified teams were in a single group (CBF ranking shown in parentheses).

Group
- (Minas Gerais) Atlético Mineiro (5)
- (Paraná (state)) Atlético Paranaense (9)
- (Rio Grande do Sul) Internacional (10)
- (São Paulo (state)) São Paulo (11)
- (São Paulo (state)) Ponte Preta (16)
- (Bahia) Vitória (18)
- Goiás (22)
- (Santa Catarina (state)) Avaí (23)
- (Pernambuco) Náutico (32)
- (Ceará) Ferroviário (no rank)

In the fourth stage, each tie was played on a home-and-away two-legged basis. If tied on aggregate, the away goals rule would not be used, extra time would not be played and the penalty shoot-out would be used to determine the winner.

Team 1	Agg.	Team 2	1st leg	2nd leg
Ponte Preta (São Paulo (state))	3–1	(Pernambuco) Náutico	3–0	0–1
Atlético Paranaense (Paraná (state))	4–3	(São Paulo (state)) São Paulo	2–1	2–2
Avaí (Santa Catarina (state))	2–4	Goiás	2–2	0–2
Internacional (Rio Grande do Sul)	2–2 (3–4 p)	(Bahia) Vitória	2–1	0–1
Atlético Mineiro (Minas Gerais)	6–2	(Ceará) Ferroviário	4–0	2–2

== Final stages ==
In the final stages, each tie was played on a home-and-away two-legged basis. If tied on aggregate, the away goals rule would not be used, extra time would not be played and the penalty shoot-out would be used to determine the winner.

=== Bracket ===
Round of 16
Bahia	3	0	3
(Rio de Janeiro (state)) Vasco da Gama	0	2	2
(Minas Gerais) América Mineiro	1	1	2
(São Paulo (state)) Palmeiras	2	1	3
(São Paulo (state)) Santos	5	1	6
(Mato Grosso) Luverdense	1	2	3
(Paraná (state)) Atlético Paranaense	1	1	2
(Minas Gerais) Cruzeiro	2	1	3
Goiás	0	1	1
(Rio Grande do Sul) Grêmio	2	3	5
(São Paulo (state)) Ponte Preta	0	0	0
(Rio de Janeiro (state)) Flamengo	1	0	1
(Bahia) Vitória	0	1	1
(São Paulo (state)) Corinthians	0	3	3
(Minas Gerais) Atlético Mineiro	0	0	0 (3)
(Santa Catarina (state)) Chapecoense (p)	0	0	0 (4)

Quarter-finals
Bahia	0	0	0
(São Paulo (state)) Palmeiras	0	1	1
(São Paulo (state)) Santos	0	2	2 (0)
(Minas Gerais) Cruzeiro (p)	1	1	2 (3)
(Rio Grande do Sul) Grêmio	1	0	1
(Rio de Janeiro (state)) Flamengo	1	1	2
(São Paulo (state)) Corinthians	1	1	2
(Santa Catarina (state)) Chapecoense	0	0	0

Semi-finals
(São Paulo (state)) Palmeiras	0	1	1
(Minas Gerais) Cruzeiro	1	1	2
(Rio de Janeiro (state)) Flamengo	0	1	1
(São Paulo (state)) Corinthians	0	2	2

Finals
(Minas Gerais) Cruzeiro	1	2	3
(São Paulo (state)) Corinthians	0	1	1

=== Round of 16 ===
The draw for the round of 16 was held on 20 April 2018, 11:00 at CBF headquarters in Rio de Janeiro. The 16 qualified teams were divided in two pots. Teams from Pot 1 were the ones which competed at the 2018 Copa Libertadores. Pot 2 was composed of the five teams which qualified through the Fourth Stage plus the champions of 2017 Copa Verde, 2017 Copa do Nordeste and 2017 Campeonato Brasileiro Série B.

- CBF ranking shown in brackets.

Pot 1	Pot 2
(São Paulo (state)) Palmeiras (1); (Minas Gerais) Cruzeiro (1); (Rio Grande do Sul) Grêmio (3); (São Paulo (state)) Santos (4); (São Paulo (state)) Corinthians (6); (Rio de Janeiro (state)) Flamengo (7); (Rio de Janeiro (state)) Vasco da Gama (13); (Santa Catarina (state)) Chapecoense (14)	(Minas Gerais) Atlético Mineiro (5); (Paraná (state)) Atlético Paranaense (9); (São Paulo (state)) Ponte Preta (16); (Bahia) Vitória (18); Bahia (21); Goiás (22); (Minas Gerais) América Mineiro (24); (Mato Grosso) Luverdense (34)

The first legs were played from 25 April to 16 May and the second legs were played from 9 May to 16 July 2018.

Team 1	Agg.	Team 2	1st leg	2nd leg
Atlético Mineiro (Minas Gerais)	0–0 (3–4 p)	(Santa Catarina (state)) Chapecoense	0–0	0–0
Atlético Paranaense (Paraná (state))	2–3	(Minas Gerais) Cruzeiro	1–2	1–1
Bahia	3–2	(Rio de Janeiro (state)) Vasco da Gama	3–0	0–2
Goiás	1–5	(Rio Grande do Sul) Grêmio	0–2	1–3
Vitória (Bahia)	1–3	(São Paulo (state)) Corinthians	0–0	1–3
América Mineiro (Minas Gerais)	2–3	(São Paulo (state)) Palmeiras	1–2	1–1
Ponte Preta (São Paulo (state))	0–1	(Rio de Janeiro (state)) Flamengo	0–1	0–0
Santos (São Paulo (state))	6–3	(Mato Grosso) Luverdense	5–1	1–2

=== Quarter-finals ===
The draw for the quarter-finals was held on 30 May 2018, 11:00 at CBF headquarters in Rio de Janeiro. All teams were placed into a single pot.

- CBF ranking shown in brackets.

Pot
- (São Paulo (state)) Palmeiras (1)
- (Minas Gerais) Cruzeiro (1)^{[1]}
- (Rio Grande do Sul) Grêmio (3)
- (São Paulo (state)) Santos (4)
- (São Paulo (state)) Corinthians (6)
- (Rio de Janeiro (state)) Flamengo (7)
- (Santa Catarina (state)) Chapecoense (14)
- Bahia (21)^{[1]}

^{1} The identity of Atlético Paranaense v Cruzeiro and Bahia v Vasco da Gama winners were not known at the time of the draw.

The first legs were played on 1 and 2 August and the second legs were played on 15 and 16 August 2018.

Team 1	Agg.	Team 2	1st leg	2nd leg
Corinthians (São Paulo (state))	2–0	(Santa Catarina (state)) Chapecoense	1–0	1–0
Grêmio (Rio Grande do Sul)	1–2	(Rio de Janeiro (state)) Flamengo	1–1	0–1
Bahia	0–1	(São Paulo (state)) Palmeiras	0–0	0–1
Santos (São Paulo (state))	2–2 (0–3 p)	(Minas Gerais) Cruzeiro	0–1	2–1

=== Semi-finals ===
The draw to determine the home-and-away teams for both legs was held on 22 August 2018, 11:00 at CBF headquarters in Rio de Janeiro. The first legs were played on 12 September and the second legs were played on 26 September 2018.

Team 1	Agg.	Team 2	1st leg	2nd leg
Flamengo (Rio de Janeiro (state))	1–2	(São Paulo (state)) Corinthians	0–0	1–2
Palmeiras (São Paulo (state))	1–2	(Minas Gerais) Cruzeiro	0–1	1–1

=== Finals ===
The draw to determine the home-and-away teams for both legs was held on 27 September 2018, 14:30 at CBF headquarters in Rio de Janeiro.

10 October 2018
21:45

Cruzeiro (Minas Gerais)	1–0	(São Paulo (state)) Corinthians
Thiago Neves 45'	Report

Mineirão, Belo Horizonte
Attendance: 53,368
Referee: Anderson Daronco (Rio Grande do Sul)

17 October 2018
21:45

Corinthians (São Paulo (state))	1–2	(Minas Gerais) Cruzeiro
Jádson 54' (pen.)	Report	Robinho 27'; De Arrascaeta 81'

Arena Corinthians, São Paulo
Attendance: 46,571
Referee: Wagner do Nascimento Magalhães (Rio de Janeiro)

2018 Copa do Brasil Champions
Cruzeiro
6th Title

== Top goalscorers ==
Rank	Player	Team	Goals
1	(Brazil) Gabriel	(São Paulo (state)) Santos	4
1	(Brazil) Neílton	(Bahia) Vitória	4
1	(Brazil) Rômulo	(Santa Catarina (state)) Avaí	4
4	(Brazil) Denílson	(Bahia) Vitória	3
4	(Brazil) Guilherme	(Paraná (state)) Atlético Paranaense	3
4	(Brazil) Mazinho	(Ceará) Ferroviário	3
4	(Venezuela) Rómulo Otero	(Minas Gerais) Atlético Mineiro	3
4	(Brazil) Ricardo Oliveira	(Minas Gerais) Atlético Mineiro	3
4	(Paraguay) Ángel Romero	(São Paulo (state)) Corinthians	3
4	(Brazil) Valdívia	(São Paulo (state)) São Paulo	3
4	(Brazil) Weverton	(Mato Grosso) Cuiabá	3

Source:CBF
