= 2018 Copa do Brasil Third Stage =

The 2018 Copa do Brasil third stage was the third stage of the 2018 Copa do Brasil football competition. It was played from 28 February to 15 March 2018. A total of 20 teams competed in the third stage to decide ten places in the fourth stage of the 2018 Copa do Brasil.

== Format ==
In the third stage, each tie was played on a home-and-away two-legged basis. If tied on aggregate, the away goals rule would not be used, extra time would not be played and the penalty shoot-out would be used to determine the winner. Host teams were settled in a draw held on 21 February 2018, 11:00 at CBF headquarters in Rio de Janeiro.

== Matches ==
All times are Brasília time, BRT (UTC−3)

Team 1	Agg.	Team 2	1st leg	2nd leg
Atlético Paranaense (Paraná (state))	1–1 (6–5 p)	Ceará	0–0	1–1
Internacional (Rio Grande do Sul)	4–0	(Paraná (state)) Cianorte	2–0	2–0
Fluminense (Rio de Janeiro (state))	1–3	(Santa Catarina (state)) Avaí	1–2	0–1
Goiás	2–1	(Paraná (state)) Coritiba	1–0	1–1
Ponte Preta (São Paulo (state))	0–0 (5–3 p)	(Maranhão) Sampaio Corrêa	0–0	0–0
São Paulo (São Paulo (state))	5–0	(Alagoas) CRB	2–0	3–0
Bragantino (São Paulo (state))	1–3	(Bahia) Vitória	1–0	0–3
Figueirense (Santa Catarina (state))	2–2 (2–4 p)	(Minas Gerais) Atlético Mineiro	0–1	2–1
Ferroviário (Ceará)	2–1	(Goiás) Vila Nova	1–1	1–0
Náutico (Pernambuco)	3–1	(Mato Grosso) Cuiabá	2–1	1–0

=== Match 61 ===
28 February 2018
21:30

Atlético Paranaense (Paraná (state))	0–0	Ceará
	Report

Arena da Baixada, Curitiba
Attendance: 8,646
Referee: Flávio Rodrigues de Souza (São Paulo)

15 March 2018
21:30

Ceará	1–1	(Paraná (state)) Atlético Paranaense
Felipe Azevedo 33'	Report	Guilherme 14'
Penalties
Pio (penalty scored); Felipe Azevedo (penalty missed); Andrigo (penalty scored); Juninho (penalty scored); Romário (penalty scored); Richardson (penalty scored); Wescley (penalty missed)	5–6	(penalty scored) Guilherme; (penalty scored) González; (penalty scored) Paulo André; (penalty scored) Zé Ivaldo; (penalty missed) Thiago Carleto; (penalty scored) Ribamar; (penalty scored) Pavez

Castelão, Fortaleza
Attendance: 14,090
Referee: André Luiz de Freitas Castro (Goiás)

Tied 1–1 on aggregate, Atlético Paranaense won on penalties and advanced to the fourth round.

=== Match 62 ===
1 March 2018
19:15

Internacional (Rio Grande do Sul)	2–0	(Paraná (state)) Cianorte
Iago 53'; Edenílson 67'	Report

Estádio Beira-Rio, Porto Alegre
Attendance: 10,996
Referee: Bráulio da Silva Machado (Santa Catarina)

14 March 2018
19:30

Cianorte (Paraná (state))	0–2	(Rio Grande do Sul) Internacional
	Report	Patrick 38'; D'Alessandro 68'

Estádio Olímpico Albino Turbay, Cianorte
Attendance: 2,348
Referee: Bruno Arleu de Araújo (Rio de Janeiro)

Internacional won 4–0 on aggregate and advanced to the fourth round.

=== Match 63 ===
1 March 2018
19:15

Fluminense (Rio de Janeiro (state))	1–2	(Santa Catarina (state)) Avaí
Ibañez 10'	Report	André Moritz 43'; Rômulo 75'

Estádio Olímpico Nilton Santos, Rio de Janeiro
Attendance: 8,214
Referee: Leandro Bizzio Marinho (São Paulo)

15 March 2018
21:30

Avaí (Santa Catarina (state))	1–0	(Rio de Janeiro (state)) Fluminense
Lourenço 78'	Report

Estádio da Ressacada, Florianópolis
Attendance: 8,296
Referee: Vinicius Gonçalves Dias Araújo (São Paulo)

Avaí won 3–1 on aggregate and advanced to the fourth round.

=== Match 64 ===
28 February 2018
19:30

Goiás	1–0	(Paraná (state)) Coritiba
Jefferson 53'	Report

Estádio Serra Dourada, Goiânia
Attendance: 17,556
Referee: Caio Max Augusto Vieira (Rio Grande do Norte)

14 March 2018
19:30

Coritiba (Paraná (state))	1–1	Goiás
Wilson 50' (pen.)	Report	Carlos Eduardo 29'

Estádio Couto Pereira, Curitiba
Attendance: 4,694
Referee: Marcelo Aparecido Ribeiro de Souza (São Paulo)

Goiás won 2–1 on aggregate and advanced to the fourth round.

=== Match 65 ===
28 February 2018
19:30

Ponte Preta (São Paulo (state))	0–0	(Maranhão) Sampaio Corrêa
	Report

Estádio Moisés Lucarelli, Campinas
Attendance: 3,202
Referee: Paulo Roberto Alves Júnior (Paraná)

15 March 2018
19:15

Sampaio Corrêa (Maranhão)	0–0	(São Paulo (state)) Ponte Preta
	Report
Penalties
Uilliam (penalty scored); Joécio (penalty scored); Fernando Sobral (penalty missed); João Paulo (penalty scored)	3–5	(penalty scored) Marciel; (penalty scored) Silvinho; (penalty scored) Nathan; (penalty scored) Yuri; (penalty scored) Orinho

Castelão, São Luís
Attendance: 14,156
Referee: Elmo Alves Resende Cunha (Goiás)

Tied 0–0 on aggregate, Ponte Preta won on penalties and advanced to the fourth round.

=== Match 66 ===
28 February 2018
19:30

São Paulo (São Paulo (state))	2–0	(Alagoas) CRB
Valdívia 34'; Éder Militão 41'	Report

Estádio do Morumbi, São Paulo
Attendance: 8,514
Referee: Leandro Vuaden (Rio Grande do Sul)

14 March 2018
19:30

CRB (Alagoas)	0–3	(São Paulo (state)) São Paulo
	Report	Marcos Guilherme 5'; Valdívia 46'; Rodrigo Caio 58'

Estádio Rei Pelé, Maceió
Attendance: 13,248
Referee: Marcelo de Lima Henrique (Rio de Janeiro)

São Paulo won 5–0 on aggregate and advanced to the fourth round.

=== Match 67 ===
28 February 2018
19:30

Bragantino (São Paulo (state))	1–0	(Bahia) Vitória
Matheus Peixoto 38'	Report

Estádio Nabi Abi Chedid, Bragança Paulista
Attendance: 4,091
Referee: Igor Junio Benevenuto (Minas Gerais)

15 March 2018
19:15

Vitória (Bahia)	3–0	(São Paulo (state)) Bragantino
Neílton 21', 63', 72'	Report

Barradão, Salvador
Attendance: 6,023
Referee: Rafael Traci (Paraná)

Vitória won 3–1 on aggregate and advanced to the fourth round.

=== Match 68 ===
28 February 2018
21:45

Figueirense (Santa Catarina (state))	0–1	(Minas Gerais) Atlético Mineiro
	Report	Otero 31'

Estádio Orlando Scarpelli, Florianópolis
Attendance: 8,394
Referee: Bruno Arleu de Araújo (Rio de Janeiro)

14 March 2018
21:45

Atlético Mineiro (Minas Gerais)	1–2	(Santa Catarina (state)) Figueirense
Ricardo Oliveira 25'	Report	Zé Antônio 21'; Jorge Henrique 70'
Penalties
Fábio Santos (penalty scored); Ricardo Oliveira (penalty scored); Andrade (penalty scored); Luan (penalty scored)	4–2	(penalty missed) Jorge Henrique; (penalty scored) André Luis; (penalty missed) Diego Renan; (penalty scored) Cedrón

Estádio Independência, Belo Horizonte
Attendance: 15,169
Referee: Dyorgines José Padovani de Andrade (Espírito Santo)

Tied 2–2 on aggregate, Atlético Mineiro won on penalties and advanced to the fourth round.

=== Match 69 ===
28 February 2018
20:30

Ferroviário (Ceará)	1–1	(Goiás) Vila Nova
Janeudo 45+3' (pen.)	Report	Keké 75'

Estádio Presidente Vargas, Fortaleza
Attendance: 2,378
Referee: Pathrice Wallace Corrêa Maia (Rio de Janeiro)

15 March 2018
20:30

Vila Nova (Goiás)	0–1	(Ceará) Ferroviário
	Report	Janeudo 22'

Estádio Serra Dourada, Goiânia
Attendance: 30,374
Referee: Leandro Bizzio Marinho (São Paulo)

Ferroviário won 2–1 on aggregate and advanced to the fourth round.

=== Match 70 ===
28 February 2018
19:30

Náutico (Pernambuco)	2–1	(Mato Grosso) Cuiabá
Ortigoza 57'; Tharcysio 77'	Report	Doda 68'

Arena Pernambuco, São Lourenço da Mata
Attendance: 5,302
Referee: Wanderson Alves de Sousa (Minas Gerais)

14 March 2018
21:45

Cuiabá (Mato Grosso)	0–1	(Pernambuco) Náutico
	Report	Ortigoza 85'

Arena Pantanal, Cuiabá
Attendance: 0
Referee: Emerson de Almeida Ferreira (Minas Gerais)

Náutico won 3–1 on aggregate and advanced to the fourth round.
