= 2017 Campeonato Amazonense =

Campeonato Amazonense Série A
- Season: 2017
- Dates: Start date: 14 March 2017
- Champions: Manaus
- Relegated: Holanda; São Raimundo-AM
- Matches played: 28
- Goals scored: 81 (2.89 per match)
- Top goalscorer: Marinho (Holanda) (10 goals); Leonardo (Rio Negro-AM) (10 goals)
- Biggest home win: Penarol 5–1 Holanda (April 8)
- Biggest away win: São Raimundo-AM 1-4 Manaus
- Highest attendance: 3540

The 2017 Campeonato Amazonense is the 101st season of Amazonas' top football league. Nacional-AM and Rio Negro-AM were deducted 20 and 7 points, respectively, but this was later overruled. Manaus won for the first time after defeating Nacional-AM 2–1 on aggregate.

== Format ==
Tournament

- All eight teams play each other twice, for a total of fourteen games.
- The top four teams move on to the semi-finals. They are paired according to their record:
- 1 vs. 4
- 2 vs. 3
- The results are decided on aggregate over two legs.
- The better teams host the second leg.
- The best two teams go on to the final, decided over two legs, played at a neutral venue.

Qualification

- The top two teams not already playing in Série A, Série B, or Série C, or already assured qualification to Série D qualify for the 2018 Campeonato Brasileiro Série D
- The winner and runner-up qualify for the 2018 Copa do Brasil.
- The top three teams qualify for the 2018 Copa Verde.

== Teams ==
Club	Home city	2016 final result
Fast Clube	Manaus	1st
Holanda	Rio Preto da Eva, but played games in Manaus	1st (Série B)
Manaus	Manaus	6th
Nacional-AM	Manaus	3rd
Penarol	Itacoatiara	2nd (Série B)
Princesa do Solimões	Manacapuru	2nd
Rio Negro-AM	Manaus	4th
São Raimundo-AM	Manaus	5th

== Regular season ==
Key to colours in table
Top four teams advance to the Semi-Finals
Four bottom teams are eliminated, two bottom teams are relegated.

Pos	Team	Pld	W	D	L	GF	GA	GD	Pts	Qualification or relegation
1	Nacional-AM	14	8	2	4	29	19	+10	26	Qualification for 2017 Campeonato Amazonense Semi-Finals
2	Fast Clube	14	6	5	3	23	12	+11	23	Qualification for 2017 Campeonato Amazonense Semi-Finals
3	Manaus	14	6	5	3	21	14	+7	23	Qualification for 2017 Campeonato Amazonense Semi-Finals
4	Princesa do Solimões	14	6	5	3	19	15	+4	23	Qualification for 2017 Campeonato Amazonense Semi-Finals
5	Rio Negro-AM	14	6	3	5	24	21	+3	21	
6	Penarol	14	5	5	4	23	17	+6	20	
7	Holanda	14	4	4	6	22	25	−3	16	Relegation to 2018 Série B
8	São Raimundo-AM	14	0	1	13	6	44	−38	1	Relegation to 2018 Série B

== Final Rounds ==
Semifinals
4	Princesa do Solimões	2	2	2
1	Nacional-AM	2	2	4
3	Manaus	2	1	3
2	Fast Clube	0	1	1

Finals
1	Nacional-AM	0	1	1
3	Manaus	1	1	2

=== Semi-finals ===
24 May 2017
17:00 UTC–4

Princesa do Solimões	2-2	Nacional-AM
Weverton 43'; Branco 70'	Report	27' Paulo Roberto; 58' Jeferson

Estádio Gilbertão, Manacapuru

31 May 2017
20:00 UTC–4

Nacional-AM	2-0	Princesa do Solimões
Paulo Roberto 81'; Charles 90+10'	Report

Estádio Ismael Benigno, Manaus

Nacional-AM win 4–2 on Aggregate

25 May 2017
20:00 UTC–4

Manaus	2-0	Fast Clube
Hamilton 45+1'; Binho 50'	Report

Estádio Ismael Benigno, Manaus

1 June 2017
20:00 UTC–4

Fast Clube	1-1	Manaus
Léo Guerreiro 36'	Report	12' Hamilton

Estádio Ismael Benigno, Manaus

Manaus win 4–2 on Aggregate

=== Third-place match ===
14 June 2017
20:00 UTC–4

Fast Clube	2-0	Princesa do Solimões
Bianor 57'; Vitinho 77'	Report

Arena da Amazônia, Manaus

=== Final ===
6 June 2017
20:00 UTC–4

Manaus	1-0	Nacional-AM
Wesley Napão 90+1'	Report

Arena da Amazônia, Manaus
10 June 2017
20:00 UTC–4

Nacional-AM	1-1	Manaus
Jefferson Siqueira 90+2'	Report	Negueba 22'

Arena da Amazônia, Manaus

Manaus win 2–1 on Aggregate

Campeonato Amazonense
2017 Champion

Manaus
1st Title

Manaus and Nacional-AM qualify for the 2018 Campeonato Brasileiro Série D.
Manaus and Nacional-AM qualify for the 2018 Copa Do Brasil.
Manaus, Nacional-AM, and Fast Clube qualify for the 2018 Copa Verde.
