= 2018 Copa Verde =

Tournament details
- Country: Brazil
- Dates: 21 January – 16 May
- Teams: 18

Final positions
- Champions: (Pará) Paysandu (2nd title)
- Runners-up: (Espírito Santo) Atlético Itapemirim

Tournament statistics
- Matches played: 34
- Goals scored: 103 (3.03 per match)
- Top goal scorer(s): (Brazil) Cassiano (9 goals)

The 2018 Copa Verde was the fifth edition of a football competition held in Brazil. Featuring 18 clubs, Distrito Federal, Mato Grosso do Sul and Tocantins has two vacancies; Acre, Amapá, Amazonas, Espírito Santo, Mato Grosso, Pará, Rondônia and Roraima with one each. The others four berths was set according to CBF ranking.

In the finals, Paysandu defeated Atlético Itapemirim 3–1 on aggregate to win their second title and a place in the Round of 16 of the 2019 Copa do Brasil.

== Qualified teams ==
| Association | Team | Qualification method |
|---|---|---|
| (Acre (state)) Acre; 1+1 berths | Atlético Acreano | 2017 Campeonato Acriano champions |
| (Acre (state)) Acre; 1+1 berths | Rio Branco | 3rd best placed team in the 2018 CBF ranking not already qualified |
| (Amapá) Amapá; 1 berth | Santos | 2017 Campeonato Amapaense champions |
| (Amazonas (Brazilian state)) Amazonas; 1+1 berths | Manaus | 2017 Campeonato Amazonense champions |
| (Amazonas (Brazilian state)) Amazonas; 1+1 berths | Princesa do Solimões | 4th best placed team in the 2018 CBF ranking not already qualified |
| (Federal District (Brazil)) Distrito Federal; 2 berths | Brasiliense | 2017 Campeonato Brasiliense champions |
| (Federal District (Brazil)) Distrito Federal; 2 berths | Ceilândia | 2017 Campeonato Brasiliense runners-up |
| (Espírito Santo) Espírito Santo; 1 berth | Atlético Itapemirim | 2017 Copa Espírito Santo champions |
| (Mato Grosso) Mato Grosso; 1+1 berths | Cuiabá | 2017 Campeonato Mato-Grossense champions |
| (Mato Grosso) Mato Grosso; 1+1 berths | Luverdense | 1st best placed team in the 2018 CBF ranking not already qualified |
| (Mato Grosso do Sul) Mato Grosso do Sul; 2 berths | Corumbaense | 2017 Campeonato Sul-Mato-Grossense champions |
| (Mato Grosso do Sul) Mato Grosso do Sul; 2 berths | Operário | 2017 Campeonato Sul-Mato-Grossense 3rd place |
| (Pará) Pará; 1+1 berths | Paysandu | 2017 Campeonato Paraense champions |
| (Pará) Pará; 1+1 berths | Remo | 2nd best placed team in the 2018 CBF ranking not already qualified |
| (Rondônia) Rondônia; 1 berth | Real Ariquemes | 2017 Campeonato Rondoniense champions |
| (Roraima) Roraima; 1 berth | São Raimundo | 2017 Campeonato Roraimense champions |
| (Tocantins) Tocantins; 2 berths | Interporto | 2017 Campeonato Tocantinense champions |
| (Tocantins) Tocantins; 2 berths | Sparta | 2017 Campeonato Tocantinense runners-up |

== Schedule ==
The schedule of the competition is as follows.

| Stage | First leg | Second leg |
|---|---|---|
| Preliminary round | 21 January 2018 | 24 January 2018 |
| Round of 16 | 31 January and 7, 8 and 9 February 2018 | 14, 15, 20 and 21 February 2018 |
| Quarter-finals | 7 and 8 March 2018 | 15, 17 and 18 March 2018 |
| Semi-finals | 27 and 28 March 2018 | 11 and 12 April 2018 |
| Finals | 25 April 2018 | 16 May 2018 |

== Preliminary round ==
| Team 1 | Agg. | Team 2 | 1st leg | 2nd leg |
|---|---|---|---|---|
| Interporto (Tocantins) | 5–2 | (Amazonas (Brazilian state)) Princesa do Solimões | 3–2 | 2–0 |
| Corumbaense (Mato Grosso do Sul) | 3–2 | (Federal District (Brazil)) Ceilândia | 3–1 | 0–1 |

== Bracket ==
Round of 16
(Tocantins) Sparta (p) | 1 | 1 | 2 (4)
(Rondônia) Real Ariquemes | 1 | 1 | 2 (2)
(Mato Grosso do Sul) Corumbaense | 0 | 2 | 2
(Mato Grosso) Luverdense | 2 | 3 | 5
(Mato Grosso do Sul) Operário | 1 | 0 | 1
(Mato Grosso) Cuiabá | 0 | 3 | 3
(Espírito Santo) Atlético Itapemirim | 2 | 3 | 5
(Federal District (Brazil)) Brasiliense | 1 | 2 | 3
(Acre (state)) Atlético Acreano | 3 | 1 | 4
(Amapá) Santos (a) | 2 | 2 | 4
(Tocantins) Interporto | 0 | 0 | 0
(Pará) Paysandu | 0 | 4 | 4
(Amazonas (Brazilian state)) Manaus | 2 | 1 | 3
(Pará) Remo | 0 | 1 | 1
(Roraima) São Raimundo | 1 | 2 | 3
(Acre (state)) Rio Branco | 2 | 2 | 4

Quarter-finals
(Tocantins) Sparta | 1 | 0 | 1
(Mato Grosso) Luverdense | 0 | 7 | 7
(Mato Grosso) Cuiabá | 2 | 1 | 3
(Espírito Santo) Atlético Itapemirim | 3 | 3 | 6
(Amapá) Santos | 2 | 2 | 4
(Pará) Paysandu | 3 | 4 | 7
(Amazonas (Brazilian state)) Manaus (p) | 1 | 1 | 2 (4)
(Acre (state)) Rio Branco | 1 | 1 | 2 (2)

Semi-finals
(Mato Grosso) Luverdense | 0 | 1 | 1
(Espírito Santo) Atlético Itapemirim | 1 | 1 | 2
(Pará) Paysandu | 2 | 2 | 4
(Amazonas (Brazilian state)) Manaus | 1 | 1 | 2

Finals
(Espírito Santo) Atlético Itapemirim | 0 | 1 | 1
(Pará) Paysandu | 2 | 1 | 3

== Finals ==
25 April 2018
21:30 BRT (UTC−3)

| Atlético Itapemirim (Espírito Santo) | 0–2 | (Pará) Paysandu |
|---|---|---|
| | Report | Cassiano 54', 72' |

Estádio Kléber Andrade, Cariacica
Attendance: 6,965
Referee: Rodolpho Toski Marques

16 May 2018
21:30 BRT (UTC−3)

| Paysandu (Pará) | 1–1 | (Espírito Santo) Atlético Itapemirim |
|---|---|---|
| Pedro Carmona 72' | Report | Eraldo 39' |

Mangueirão, Belém
Attendance: 32,900
Referee: Anderson Daronco

Paysandu won 3–1 on aggregate.
