= Weverton =

Weverton may refer to:

== People ==
- Weverton (footballer, born 1987), full name Weverton Pereira da Silva, Brazilian football goalkeeper
- Wéverton (footballer, born 1992), full name Wéverton Gomes Souza, Brazilian football forward
- Weverton (footballer, born 1993), full name Weverton Nunes Coelho, Brazilian football forward
- Weverton (footballer, born 1999), full name Weverton Guilherme da Silva Souza, Brazilian football right-back
- Weverton (footballer, born 2003), full name Weverton Silva de Andrade, Brazilian football defender
- Petróleo (footballer), full name Weverton da Silva Jacinto (born 1993), Brazilian football defender
- Weverton Rocha (born 1979), Brazilian politician, senator from Maranhão (2019–present)

== Places ==
- Weverton, Maryland, unincorporated community in Washington County, Maryland

== See also ==
- Ferrugem (footballer, born 1988), full name Weverton Almeida Santos, Brazilian football right-back
