= 2017 Campeonato Paraibano =

Campeonato Paraibano de Futebol
- Season: 2017
- Champions: Botafogo-PB
- Relegated: Internacional-PB; Paraíba
- Copa do Brasil: Botafogo-PB; Treze
- Série D: Treze; Campinense
- Copa do Nordeste: Botafogo-PB; Treze
- Matches played: 96
- Goals scored: 213 (2.22 per match)
- Top goalscorer: 16 goals (Rafael Nascimento, Botafogo-PB)
- Biggest home win: 4–1 (Campinense v Serrano, Round 1, 8 January 2017); 3–0 (Campinense v Paraíba, Round 8, 16 February 2017); 3–0 (Treze v CSP, Round 11, 5 March 2017); 4–1 (Botafogo-PB v Sousa, Round 12, 8 March 2017); 3–0 (Botafogo-PB v Paraíba, Round 17, 9 April 2017)
- Biggest away win: 0–7 (Internacional-PB v Auto Esporte, Round 18, 16 April 2017)
- Highest scoring: 8 (Auto Esporte 3–5 Campinense, Round 13, 16 March 2017)
- Longest winning run: 5 (Campinense)
- Longest unbeaten run: 11 (Treze)
- Longest winless run: 11 (Internacional-PB, Paraíba )
- Longest losing run: 6 (CSP, Internacional-PB)
- Highest attendance: 11,684 (Botafogo-PB v Treze, Final, 2nd leg, 7 May 2017)
- All statistics correct as of 09:12, 9 May 2017 (UTC).

The 2017 Campeonato Paraibano de Futebol was the 107th edition of Paraíba's top professional football league. The competition began on 8 January and ended on 7 May. Botafogo-PB were champions, after defeating Treze in the final.

== Format ==
The competition is divided into two stages.

In the first stage, the ten teams will play each other home and away, for a total of eighteen games.

In the final stage, the top four teams from the first stage will play a semi-final over two legs. The first ranked team will play the fourth ranked team and the second ranked team will play the third ranked team. The higher ranked team will play at home in the second leg in both cases. The winners of these ties will play the final over two legs.

=== Qualification ===
The two finalists qualified to participate in the 2018 Copa do Brasil and 2018 Copa do Nordeste. The two best placed teams (other than Botafogo-PB) qualified to participate in the 2018 Campeonato Brasileiro Série D.

== Participating teams ==
Club	Home city	2016 result
Atlético Cajazeirense	Cajazeiras	8th
Auto Esporte	João Pessoa	7th
Botafogo-PB	João Pessoa	2nd
Campinense	Campina Grande	1st
CSP	João Pessoa	4th
Serrano	Campina Grande	2nd (2nd division)
Internacional-PB	João Pessoa	1st (2nd division)
Paraíba	Cajazeiras	5th
Sousa	Sousa	3rd
Treze	Campina Grande	6th

== First stage ==
=== Standings ===
Pos	Team	Pld	W	D	L	GF	GA	GD	Pts	Qualification
1	Botafogo-PB (Q)	18	13	1	4	29	13	+16	40	Qualification for Final stage
2	Campinense (Q)	18	10	5	3	29	16	+13	35	Qualification for Final stage
3	Treze (Q)	18	7	8	3	16	8	+8	29	Qualification for Final stage
4	Atlético Cajazeirense (Q)	18	7	6	5	17	11	+6	27	Qualification for Final stage
5	Auto Esporte	18	7	4	7	24	22	+2	25	
6	Serrano	18	6	4	8	22	29	−7	22	
7	Sousa	18	5	6	7	22	24	−2	21	
8	CSP	18	5	3	10	13	23	−10	18	
9	Internacional-PB (R)	18	3	7	8	16	28	−12	16	Relegated to Second Division
10	Paraíba (R)	18	1	8	9	11	25	−14	11	Relegated to Second Division

Updated to match(es) played on 16 April 2017. Source:
Rules for classification: 1) points; 2) wins; 3) goal difference; 4) number of goals scored; 5) least red cards; 6) least yellow cards; 7) Seeding by FPF.
(Q) Qualified for the phase indicated; (R) Relegated

== Knockout stage ==
Semifinals
1	Botafogo-PB	3	1	4
4	Atlético Cajazeirense	0	0	0
2	Campinense	1	0	1
3	Treze	2	0	2

Finals
1	Botafogo-PB	3	1	4
3	Treze	2	1	3
