= 2017 Campeonato Acreano =

Campeonato Acreano 1º Divisão
- Season: 2017
- Dates: Start date: 19 February 2017
- Teams: 8
- Champions: Atlético Acreano
- Relegated: Alto Acre
- Matches: 28
- Goals: 107 (3.82 per match)
- Biggest home win: Rio Branco 6–1 Andirá (February 19)
- Highest attendance: 2,245
- Average attendance: 281

The 2017 Campeonato Acreano was the 71st season of Acre's top football league.

== Format ==
- First stage
- Standard round-robin, in which all teams play each other once.
- Last two teams are eliminated from the competition with the last one relegated to the second division.

Second stage

- Standard round-robin, in which the six remaining teams play each other once.

Third stage (if necessary)

- Home-and-away playoff with the winners of the first and second stages.

Qualification

- The top two teams not already playing in Série A, Série B, or Série C, or already assured qualification to Série D qualify for the 2018 Campeonato Brasileiro Série D
- The winner and runner-up qualify for the 2018 Copa do Brasil.
- The winner qualifies for the 2018 Copa Verde.

== Teams ==
Club	Home city	2016 result Round 1	2016 result Round 2
Alto Acre	Epitaciolândia	4th	5th
Andirá	Rio Branco	7th	Did not qualify
Atlético-AC	Rio Branco	2nd	1st
Galvez	Rio Branco	3rd	2nd
Humaitá	Porto Acre	1st (2º Divisão)	Did not qualify
Plácido de Castro	Plácido de Castro	6th	6th
Rio Branco	Rio Branco	1st	3rd
Vasco de Gama-AC	Rio Branco	5th	4th

== First stage ==
Key to colours in table
Top six teams advance to the Second Round
Two bottom teams are eliminated, bottom team is relegated.

Pos	Team	Pld	W	D	L	GF	GA	GD	Pts	Qualification or relegation
1	Rio Branco	7	5	2	0	22	8	+14	17	Advance to the 2017 Campeonato Acreano Final
2	Atlético-AC	7	5	0	2	19	7	+12	15	Advance to the 2017 Campeonato Acreano Second Round
3	Galvez	7	4	1	2	13	10	+3	13	Advance to the 2017 Campeonato Acreano Second Round
4	Plácido de Castro	7	4	1	2	17	14	+3	13	Advance to the 2017 Campeonato Acreano Second Round
5	Humaitá	7	3	1	3	11	14	−3	10	Advance to the 2017 Campeonato Acreano Second Round
6	Vasco de Gama-AC	7	3	0	4	11	12	−1	9	Advance to the 2017 Campeonato Acreano Second Round
7	Andirá	7	1	1	5	8	23	−15	4	
8	Alto Acre	7	0	0	7	6	19	−13	0	Relegation to 2018 Campeonato Acreano 2º Divisão

== Second stage ==
Pos	Team	Pld	W	D	L	GF	GA	GD	Pts	Qualification or relegation
1	Atlético-AC	5	5	0	0	12	0	+12	15	Advance to the 2017 Campeonato Acreano Final
2	Rio Branco	5	3	1	1	15	9	+6	10	
3	Plácido de Castro	5	3	0	2	8	10	−2	9	
4	Galvez	5	2	1	2	16	9	+7	7	
5	Humaitá	5	1	0	4	6	16	−10	3	
6	Vasco de Gama-AC	5	0	0	5	5	18	−13	0	

== Finals ==
6 May 2017
17:00 UTC–5

Rio Branco	1-0	Atlético-AC
Romário 90+2'

Arena da Floresta, Rio Branco

13 May 2017
17:00 UTC–5

Atlético-AC	3-1	Rio Branco
Aílton 56'; Eduardo 81'; Alfredo 84'		38' Gustavo Xuxa

Arena da Floresta, Rio Branco

Atlético-AC win the 2017 Campeonato Acriano

Campeonato Acriano
2017 Champion

Atlético-AC
8th Title

Atlético-AC and Rio Branco qualify for the 2018 Campeonato Brasileiro Série D.
Atlético-AC and Rio Branco qualify for the 2018 Copa do Brasil.
Atlético-AC qualify for the 2018 Copa Verde.
