= 2017 Campeonato Alagoano =

Campeonato Alagoano 1º Divisão
- Season: 2017
- Dates: Start date: 21 January 2017; End date: 7 May 2017
- Champions: CRB
- Relegated: Sete de Setembro; Miguelense
- Matches played: 34
- Goals scored: 71 (2.09 per match)
- Top goalscorer: Everton Heleno (CSA) (11 goals)
- Biggest home win: CSA 7-0 Sete de Setembro (February 25)
- Highest attendance: 17,786 (CRB 3-2 CSA)

The 2017 Campeonato Alagoano is the 87th edition of the top football league in Alagoas. CRB became the champions for the 30th time and third straight time after defeating CSA over two legs, 4-2.

== Format ==
First Phase

- The 10 teams are divided into 2 groups of 5 teams each
- Each team plays all the teams from the other group twice - home and away - for a total of 10 games each.
- First to third place of each group qualifies for Hexagonal
- Fourth and fifth place of each group enter the relegation round.

Hexagonal Final

- Each team plays the others once, for a total of 5 games each.
- The top four teams qualify for the semi-finals.

Relegation Round

- The four teams play each other twice.
- The bottom two teams are relegated to the 2018 Campeonato Alagoano 2° Divisão.

Final Rounds

- The advancing teams from the Hexagonal Final are paired according to their ranking:
- 1 vs. 4
- 2 vs. 3
- The games are played over two legs, the winner being decided on aggregate.
- The winners of the semi-finals go on to the finals.
- The Final is played over two legs.
- The team with the better record over the first phase, hexagonal Final, and the semi-finals hosts the second leg.

Qualification

- The top two teams not already playing in Série A, Série B, or Série C, or already assured qualification to Série D qualify for the 2018 Campeonato Brasileiro Série D.
- The winner, runner-up, and third place qualify for the 2018 Copa do Brasil.
- The winner and runner-up qualifies for the 2018 Copa do Nordeste.

== Teams ==
| Club | Home city | 2016 result First Phase | 2016 result Hexagonal Final | 2016 Final Result |
|---|---|---|---|---|
| ASA | Arapiraca | 2nd Group A | 6th | 5th |
| CEO | Olho d'Água das Flores | 1st (2° Divisão) | Did not Qualify | 1st (2° Divisão) |
| Coruripe | Coruripe | 2nd Group B | 2nd | 4th |
| CRB | Maceió | 1st Group B | 3rd | 1st |
| CSA | Maceió | 1st Group A | 1st | 2nd |
| CSE | Palmeira dos Índios | 5th Group A | 2nd (Relegation Round) | 8th |
| Miguelense | São Miguel dos Campos | 2nd (2° Divisão) | Did not qualify | 2nd (2° Divisão) |
| Murici | Murici | 3rd Group A | 4th | 3rd |
| Santa Rita | Boca da Mata | 3rd Group B | 5th | 6th |
| Sete de Setembro | Maceió | 4th Group A | 1st (Relegation Round) | 7th |

== First phase ==
=== Group A ===
Key to colours in table
Top three teams from each group advance to the Hexagonal Final
Two bottom teams from each group enter the Relegation Round.

| Pos | Team | Pld | W | D | L | GF | GA | GD | Pts | Qualification or relegation |
|---|---|---|---|---|---|---|---|---|---|---|
| 1 | CRB | 10 | 5 | 4 | 1 | 15 | 4 | +11 | 19 | Advance to the 2017 Campeonato Alagoano Hexagonal Final |
| 2 | CEO | 10 | 4 | 1 | 5 | 10 | 9 | +1 | 13 | Advance to the 2017 Campeonato Alagoano Hexagonal Final |
| 3 | Murici | 10 | 3 | 3 | 4 | 12 | 10 | +2 | 12 | Advance to the 2017 Campeonato Alagoano Hexagonal Final |
| 4 | Sete de Setembro | 10 | 3 | 2 | 5 | 10 | 23 | −13 | 11 | Enter the 2017 Campeonato Alagoano Relegation Round |
| 5 | Coruripe | 10 | 1 | 2 | 7 | 3 | 11 | −8 | 5 | Enter the 2017 Campeonato Alagoano Relegation Round |

=== Group B ===
| Pos | Team | Pld | W | D | L | GF | GA | GD | Pts | Qualification or relegation |
|---|---|---|---|---|---|---|---|---|---|---|
| 1 | ASA | 10 | 8 | 0 | 2 | 14 | 6 | +8 | 24 | Advance to the 2017 Campeonato Alagoano Hexagonal Final |
| 2 | CSA | 10 | 7 | 3 | 0 | 20 | 3 | +17 | 24 | Advance to the 2017 Campeonato Alagoano Hexagonal Final |
| 3 | Santa Rita | 10 | 3 | 4 | 3 | 9 | 8 | +1 | 13 | Advance to the 2017 Campeonato Alagoano Hexagonal Final |
| 4 | CSE | 10 | 3 | 4 | 3 | 9 | 11 | −2 | 13 | Enter the 2017 Campeonato Alagoano Relegation Round |
| 5 | Miguelense | 10 | 1 | 1 | 8 | 5 | 22 | −17 | 4 | Enter the 2017 Campeonato Alagoano Relegation Round |

== Hexagonal Final ==
Key to colours in table
Top four teams advance to the Semi-finals

| Pos | Team | Pld | W | D | L | GF | GA | GD | Pts | Qualification or relegation |
|---|---|---|---|---|---|---|---|---|---|---|
| 1 | CRB | 5 | 4 | 1 | 0 | 10 | 5 | +5 | 13 | Advance to the 2017 Campeonato Alagoano Semi-finals |
| 2 | ASA | 5 | 3 | 1 | 1 | 8 | 6 | +2 | 10 | Advance to the 2017 Campeonato Alagoano Semi-finals |
| 3 | CSA | 5 | 2 | 2 | 1 | 4 | 2 | +2 | 8 | Advance to the 2017 Campeonato Alagoano Semi-finals |
| 4 | Murici | 5 | 2 | 1 | 2 | 6 | 5 | +1 | 7 | Advance to the 2017 Campeonato Alagoano Semi-finals |
| 5 | Santa Rita | 5 | 1 | 1 | 3 | 6 | 8 | −2 | 4 | |
| 6 | CEO | 5 | 0 | 0 | 5 | 3 | 11 | −8 | 0 | |

== Relegation round ==
Key to colours in table
Top two teams stay in the Campeonato Alagoano for 2018.
Two bottom teams are Relegated to the Campeonato Alagoano 2° Divisão.

| Pos | Team | Pld | W | D | L | GF | GA | GD | Pts | Qualification or relegation |
|---|---|---|---|---|---|---|---|---|---|---|
| 1 | CSE | 6 | 4 | 2 | 0 | 12 | 4 | +8 | 14 | Stay for the 2018 Campeonato Alagoano. |
| 2 | Coruripe | 6 | 2 | 3 | 1 | 9 | 4 | +5 | 9 | Stay for the 2018 Campeonato Alagoano. |
| 3 | Sete de Setembro | 6 | 2 | 2 | 2 | 8 | 9 | −1 | 8 | Relegated to 2018 Campeonato Alagoano 2° Divisão |
| 4 | Miguelense | 6 | 0 | 1 | 5 | 2 | 14 | −12 | 1 | Relegated to 2018 Campeonato Alagoano 2° Divisão |

== Final Rounds ==
Semifinals
4 | Murici | 1 | 1 | 2
1 | CRB | 1 | 2 | 3
3 | CSA | 1 | 2 | 3
2 | ASA | 1 | 1 | 2

Finals
1 | CRB | 1 | 3 | 4
3 | CSA | 0 | 2 | 2

=== Semi-finals ===
19 April 2017
21:45 UTC–4

| Murici | 1-1 | CRB |
|---|---|---|
| Katê 49' (Pen.) | Report | 65' (Pen.) Neto Baiano |

Estádio José Gomes da Costa, Murici
Attendance: 1511
Referee: Wagner do Nascimento Magalhaes

23 April 2017
16:00 UTC–4

| CRB | 2-1 | Murici |
|---|---|---|
| Yuri 4'; Chico 68' | Report | 19' (Pen.) Tarcísio |

Estádio Rei Pelé, Maceió
Attendance: 7457
Referee: Ricardo Marques

CRB win on Aggregate 3-2.

19 April 2017
19:45 UTC–4

| CSA | 1-1 | ASA |
|---|---|---|
| Thales 1' | Report | 40' Juninho |

Estádio Rei Pelé, Maceió
Attendance: 9284
Referee: Luiz Flavio De Oliveira

23 April 2017
16:00 UTC–4

| ASA | 1-2 | CSA |
|---|---|---|
| Tiago Souza 90+3'; Thiago Potyguar (red card) 63' | Report | 6' Rafinha; 72' Didiro; (red card) 63' Mazinho; (red card) 67' Diego Gois |

Estádio Municipal Coaracy da Mata Fonseca, Arapiraca
Attendance: 5113
Referee: Rodolpho Toski Marques

CSA win on Aggregate 3-2.

=== Third-Place Final ===
26 April 2017
20:00 UTC–4

| Murici | 2-3 | ASA |
|---|---|---|
| Marcelo Sorim 20'; Delsinho 53'; Patrick (red card); Edson Veneno (red card) | Report | 13' Tiago; 36' Jean Carlos; 62' Leandro Kivel; (red card) 90+3' Maurílio Silva |

Estádio Rei Pelé, Maceió
Attendance: 281
Referee: Denis Ribeiro Serafim

29 April 2017
17:30 UTC–4

| ASA | 3-0 | Murici |
|---|---|---|
| Leandro Kivel 70'; Mazinho 76'; Andre Lima 81' | Report |

Estádio Municipal Coaracy da Mata Fonseca, Arapiraca
Attendance: 976
Referee: José Reinaldo Figueiredo

ASA win on Aggregate 6-2.

=== Final ===
30 April 2017
16:00 UTC–4

| CRB | 1-0 | CSA |
|---|---|---|
| Neto Baiano 45' | Report |

Estádio Rei Pelé, Maceió
Attendance: 11176
Referee: Wagner do Nascimento Magalhaes

7 May 2017
16:00 UTC–4

| CSA | 2-3 | CRB |
|---|---|---|
| Celsinho 17'; Daniel Costa 36' | Report | Adalberto 11'; Mailson 18'; Neto Baiano 33' |

Estádio Rei Pelé, Maceió
Attendance: 17786
Referee: Anderson Daronco

CRB win on Aggregate 4-2.

Campeonato Alagoano
2017 Champion

CRB
30th Title

Murici and Santa Rita qualify for the 2018 Campeonato Brasileiro Série D.
CRB, CSA, and ASA qualify for the 2018 Copa do Brasil.
CRB and CSA qualify for the 2018 Copa do Nordeste.
