= 2018 Copa do Brasil final stages =

Final stages of the 2018 Brazilian football competition

The 2018 Copa do Brasil final stages were the final stages (round of 16, quarter-finals, semi-finals and finals) of the 2018 Copa do Brasil football competition. They were played from 25 April to 17 October 2018. A total of 16 teams competed in the final stages to decide the champions of the 2018 Copa do Brasil.

== Format ==
In the final stages, each tie was played on a home-and-away two-legged basis. If tied on aggregate, the away goals rule would not be used, extra time would not be played and the penalty shoot-out would be used to determine the winner.

== Bracket ==
Round of 16
Bahia	3	0	3
(Rio de Janeiro (state)) Vasco da Gama	0	2	2
(Minas Gerais) América Mineiro	1	1	2
(São Paulo (state)) Palmeiras	2	1	3
(São Paulo (state)) Santos	5	1	6
(Mato Grosso) Luverdense	1	2	3
(Paraná (state)) Atlético Paranaense	1	1	2
(Minas Gerais) Cruzeiro	2	1	3
Goiás	0	1	1
(Rio Grande do Sul) Grêmio	2	3	5
(São Paulo (state)) Ponte Preta	0	0	0
(Rio de Janeiro (state)) Flamengo	1	0	1
(Bahia) Vitória	0	1	1
(São Paulo (state)) Corinthians	0	3	3
(Minas Gerais) Atlético Mineiro	0	0	0 (3)
(Santa Catarina (state)) Chapecoense (p)	0	0	0 (4)

Quarter-finals
Bahia	0	0	0
(São Paulo (state)) Palmeiras	0	1	1
(São Paulo (state)) Santos	0	2	2 (0)
(Minas Gerais) Cruzeiro (p)	1	1	2 (3)
(Rio Grande do Sul) Grêmio	1	0	1
(Rio de Janeiro (state)) Flamengo	1	1	2
(São Paulo (state)) Corinthians	1	1	2
(Santa Catarina (state)) Chapecoense	0	0	0

Semi-finals
(São Paulo (state)) Palmeiras	0	1	1
(Minas Gerais) Cruzeiro	1	1	2
(Rio de Janeiro (state)) Flamengo	0	1	1
(São Paulo (state)) Corinthians	0	2	2

Finals
(Minas Gerais) Cruzeiro	1	2	3
(São Paulo (state)) Corinthians	0	1	1

== Round of 16 ==
=== Draw ===
The draw for the round of 16 was held on 20 April 2018, 11:00 at CBF headquarters in Rio de Janeiro. The 16 qualified teams were divided in two pots. Teams from Pot 1 were the ones which competed at the 2018 Copa Libertadores. Pot 2 was composed of the five teams which qualified through the Fourth Stage plus the champions of 2017 Copa Verde, 2017 Copa do Nordeste and 2017 Campeonato Brasileiro Série B.

- CBF ranking shown in brackets.

Pot 1	Pot 2
(São Paulo (state)) Palmeiras (1); (Minas Gerais) Cruzeiro (1); (Rio Grande do Sul) Grêmio (3); (São Paulo (state)) Santos (4); (São Paulo (state)) Corinthians (6); (Rio de Janeiro (state)) Flamengo (7); (Rio de Janeiro (state)) Vasco da Gama (13); (Santa Catarina (state)) Chapecoense (14)	(Minas Gerais) Atlético Mineiro (5); (Paraná (state)) Atlético Paranaense (9); (São Paulo (state)) Ponte Preta (16); (Bahia) Vitória (18); Bahia (21); Goiás (22); (Minas Gerais) América Mineiro (24); (Mato Grosso) Luverdense (34)

=== Matches ===
The first legs were played from 25 April to 16 May and the second legs were played from 9 May to 16 July 2018.

Team 1	Agg.	Team 2	1st leg	2nd leg
Atlético Mineiro (Minas Gerais)	0–0 (3–4 p)	(Santa Catarina (state)) Chapecoense	0–0	0–0
Atlético Paranaense (Paraná (state))	2–3	(Minas Gerais) Cruzeiro	1–2	1–1
Bahia	3–2	(Rio de Janeiro (state)) Vasco da Gama	3–0	0–2
Goiás	1–5	(Rio Grande do Sul) Grêmio	0–2	1–3
Vitória (Bahia)	1–3	(São Paulo (state)) Corinthians	0–0	1–3
América Mineiro (Minas Gerais)	2–3	(São Paulo (state)) Palmeiras	1–2	1–1
Ponte Preta (São Paulo (state))	0–1	(Rio de Janeiro (state)) Flamengo	0–1	0–0
Santos (São Paulo (state))	6–3	(Mato Grosso) Luverdense	5–1	1–2

All times are Brasília time, BRT (UTC−3)

=== Match 76 ===
2 May 2018
19:30

Atlético Mineiro (Minas Gerais)	0–0	(Santa Catarina (state)) Chapecoense
	Report

Estádio Independência, Belo Horizonte
Attendance: 19,476
Referee: Paulo Roberto Alves Júnior (Paraná)

16 May 2018
19:30

Chapecoense (Santa Catarina (state))	0–0	(Minas Gerais) Atlético Mineiro
	Report
Penalties
Wellington Paulista (penalty scored); Luiz Antônio (penalty scored); Nádson (penalty scored); Bruno Pacheco (penalty missed); Rafael Thyere (penalty scored)	4–3	(penalty missed) Ricardo Oliveira; (penalty scored) Luan; (penalty scored) Leonardo Silva; (penalty missed) Róger Guedes; (penalty scored) Cazares

Arena Condá, Chapecó
Attendance: 8,587
Referee: Leandro Bizzio Marinho (São Paulo)

Tied 0–0 on aggregate, Chapecoense won on penalties and advanced to the quarter-finals.

=== Match 77 ===
16 May 2018
21:45

Atlético Paranaense (Paraná (state))	1–2	(Minas Gerais) Cruzeiro
Thiago Carleto 41'	Report	Henrique 79'; Raniel 90+2'

Arena da Baixada, Curitiba
Attendance: 10,327
Referee: Péricles Bassols Pegado Cortez (Pernambuco)

16 July 2018
20:00

Cruzeiro (Minas Gerais)	1–1	(Paraná (state)) Atlético Paranaense
De Arrascaeta 86'	Report	Bergson 90+1'

Mineirão, Belo Horizonte
Attendance: 44,443
Referee: Leandro Vuaden (Rio Grande do Sul)

Cruzeiro won 3–2 on aggregate and advanced to the quarter-finals.

=== Match 78 ===
9 May 2018
21:45

Bahia	3–0	(Rio de Janeiro (state)) Vasco da Gama
Zé Rafael 18'; Edigar Junio 24'; Vinícius 49'	Report

Arena Fonte Nova, Salvador
Attendance: 13,447
Referee: Vinicius Gonçalves Dias Araújo (São Paulo)

16 July 2018
20:00

Vasco da Gama (Rio de Janeiro (state))	2–0	Bahia
Yago Pikachu 33' (pen.); Andrey 64'	Report

Estádio São Januário, Rio de Janeiro
Attendance: 17,561
Referee: Rafael Traci (Paraná)

Bahia won 3–2 on aggregate and advanced to the quarter-finals.

=== Match 79 ===
25 April 2018
19:30

Goiás	0–2	(Rio Grande do Sul) Grêmio
	Report	Éverton 48'; Luan 69' (pen.)

Estádio Serra Dourada, Goiânia
Attendance: 15,742
Referee: Flávio Rodrigues de Souza (São Paulo)

9 May 2018
19:30

Grêmio (Rio Grande do Sul)	3–1	Goiás
Alisson 14', 90'; Thaciano 75'	Report	Maranhão 51'

Arena do Grêmio, Porto Alegre
Attendance: 11,118
Referee: Igor Junio Benevenuto (Minas Gerais)

Grêmio won 5–1 on aggregate and advanced to the quarter-finals.

=== Match 80 ===
25 April 2018
19:30

Vitória (Bahia)	0–0	(São Paulo (state)) Corinthians
	Report

Barradão, Salvador
Attendance: 11,411
Referee: Bráulio da Silva Machado (Santa Catarina)

10 May 2018
19:30

Corinthians (São Paulo (state))	3–1	(Bahia) Vitória
Maycon 38'; Romero 58', 65'	Report	André Lima 76'

Arena Corinthians, São Paulo
Attendance: 29,625
Referee: Sandro Ricci (Paraná)

Corinthians won 3–1 on aggregate and advanced to the quarter-finals.

=== Match 81 ===
9 May 2018
19:30

América Mineiro (Minas Gerais)	1–2	(São Paulo (state)) Palmeiras
Serginho 72'	Report	Borja 37'; Keno 56'

Estádio Independência, Belo Horizonte
Attendance: 12,241
Referee: Bráulio da Silva Machado (Santa Catarina)

23 May 2018
21:45

Palmeiras (São Paulo (state))	1–1	(Minas Gerais) América Mineiro
Willian 63'	Report	Serginho 37'

Allianz Parque, São Paulo
Attendance: 22,831
Referee: Jean Pierre Gonçalves Lima (Rio Grande do Sul)

Palmeiras won 3–2 on aggregate and advanced to the quarter-finals.

=== Match 82 ===
2 May 2018
19:30

Ponte Preta (São Paulo (state))	0–1	(Rio de Janeiro (state)) Flamengo
	Report	Henrique Dourado 33'

Estádio Moisés Lucarelli, Campinas
Attendance: 9,789
Referee: Jean Pierre Gonçalves Lima (Rio Grande do Sul)

10 May 2018
19:30

Flamengo (Rio de Janeiro (state))	0–0	(São Paulo (state)) Ponte Preta
	Report

Maracanã, Rio de Janeiro
Attendance: 55,822
Referee: Ricardo Marques (Minas Gerais)

Flamengo won 1–0 on aggregate and advanced to the quarter-finals.

=== Match 83 ===
10 May 2018
21:45

Santos (São Paulo (state))	5–1	(Mato Grosso) Luverdense
Gabriel 24', 62', 67'; Gustavo Henrique 58'; Yuri Alberto 85'	Report	Itaqui 10'

Estádio Urbano Caldeira, Santos
Attendance: 3,590
Referee: Marcelo de Lima Henrique (Rio de Janeiro)

17 May 2018
19:15

Luverdense (Mato Grosso)	2–1	(São Paulo (state)) Santos
Paulo Renê 31'; Itaqui 47'	Report	Paulinho 15' (o.g.)

Estádio Passo das Emas, Lucas do Rio Verde
Attendance: 2,313
Referee: Graziani Maciel Rocha (Rio de Janeiro)

Santos won 6–3 on aggregate and advanced to the quarter-finals.

== Quarter-finals ==
=== Draw ===
The draw for the quarter-finals was held on 30 May 2018, 11:00 at CBF headquarters in Rio de Janeiro. All teams were placed into a single pot.

- CBF ranking shown in brackets.

Pot
- (São Paulo (state)) Palmeiras (1)
- (Minas Gerais) Cruzeiro (1)^{[1]}
- (Rio Grande do Sul) Grêmio (3)
- (São Paulo (state)) Santos (4)
- (São Paulo (state)) Corinthians (6)
- (Rio de Janeiro (state)) Flamengo (7)
- (Santa Catarina (state)) Chapecoense (14)
- Bahia (21)^{[1]}

^{1} The identity of Atlético Paranaense v Cruzeiro and Bahia v Vasco da Gama winners were not known at the time of the draw.

=== Matches ===
The first legs were played on 1 and 2 August and the second legs were played on 15 and 16 August 2018.

Team 1	Agg.	Team 2	1st leg	2nd leg
Corinthians (São Paulo (state))	2–0	(Santa Catarina (state)) Chapecoense	1–0	1–0
Grêmio (Rio Grande do Sul)	1–2	(Rio de Janeiro (state)) Flamengo	1–1	0–1
Bahia	0–1	(São Paulo (state)) Palmeiras	0–0	0–1
Santos (São Paulo (state))	2–2 (0–3 p)	(Minas Gerais) Cruzeiro	0–1	2–1

All times are Brasília time, BRT (UTC−3)

=== Match 84 ===
1 August 2018
21:45

Corinthians (São Paulo (state))	1–0	(Santa Catarina (state)) Chapecoense
Romero 6'	Report

Arena Corinthians, São Paulo
Attendance: 23,624
Referee: Wagner do Nascimento Magalhães (Rio de Janeiro)

15 August 2018
21:45

Chapecoense (Santa Catarina (state))	0–1	(São Paulo (state)) Corinthians
	Report	Jádson 83'

Arena Condá, Chapecó
Attendance: 11,438
Referee: Leandro Vuaden (Rio Grande do Sul)

Corinthians won 2–0 on aggregate and advanced to the semi-finals.

=== Match 85 ===
1 August 2018
21:45

Grêmio (Rio Grande do Sul)	1–1	(Rio de Janeiro (state)) Flamengo
Luan 35'	Report	Lincoln 90+3'

Arena do Grêmio, Porto Alegre
Attendance: 37,358
Referee: Raphael Claus (São Paulo)

15 August 2018
21:45

Flamengo (Rio de Janeiro (state))	1–0	(Rio Grande do Sul) Grêmio
Éverton Ribeiro 5'	Report

Maracanã, Rio de Janeiro
Attendance: 55,461
Referee: Ricardo Marques (Minas Gerais)

Flamengo won 2–1 on aggregate and advanced to the semi-finals.

=== Match 86 ===
2 August 2018
19:15

Bahia	0–0	(São Paulo (state)) Palmeiras
	Report

Arena Fonte Nova, Salvador
Attendance: 27,014
Referee: Anderson Daronco (Rio Grande do Sul)

16 August 2018
19:15

Palmeiras (São Paulo (state))	1–0	Bahia
Dudu 73'	Report

Estádio do Pacaembu, São Paulo
Attendance: 29,581
Referee: Marcelo de Lima Henrique (Rio de Janeiro)

Palmeiras won 1–0 on aggregate and advanced to the semi-finals.

=== Match 87 ===
2018 Copa do Brasil
1 August 2018
19:30
Quarter Final

Santos (São Paulo (state))	0–1	(Minas Gerais) Cruzeiro
	Report	Raniel 81'

Estádio Urbano Caldeira, Santos, Estadio Urbano Caldeira
Attendance: 7,134
Referee: Wilton Sampaio (Goiás)

Assistente 1: Fabrício Vilarinho da Silva-GO Assistente 2: Bruno Raphael Pires-GO Quarto Árbitro: Fábio Rogério Baesteiro-SP Árbitro de Vídeo Principal (VAR): Bráulio da Silva Machado-SC Assistente de VAR 1 (AVAR 1): Helton Nunes-SC Assistente de VAR 2 (AVAR 2): Marcelo de Lima Henrique-RJ

Operador de Replay VAR: Edson Serpa-PR

2018 Copa do Brasil
15 August 2018
19:30
Quarte Final

Cruzeiro (Minas Gerais)	1–2	(São Paulo (state)) Santos
Thiago Neves 12'	Report	Gabriel 42'; Bruno Henrique 83'
Penalties
Lucas Silva (penalty scored); Raniel (penalty scored); David (penalty scored)	3–0	(penalty missed) Bruno Henrique; (penalty missed) Rodrygo; (penalty missed) Jean Mota

Mineirão,, Belo Horizonte
Attendance: 49,513
Referee: Rodolpho Toski Marques (Paraná)

Assistente 1: Bruno Boschilia (PR - FIFA)Assistente 2: Alessandro Álvaro Rocha de Matos (BA - FIFA)Quarto Árbitro: Victor Hugo Imazu dos Santos (PR) Árbitro de Vídeo Principal (VAR): Wilton Pereira Sampaio (GO - FIFA)Assistente de Árbitro de Vídeo (AVAR): Carlos Berkenbrock (SC - CBF)

Operador de Replay VAR: Edson Serpa-PR

Match 1 was the first one with VAR Technologie in national competition in Brazil. Tied 2–2 on aggregate, Cruzeiro won on penalties and advanced to the semi-finals.

== Semi-finals ==
=== Draw ===
The draw to determine the home-and-away teams for both legs was held on 22 August 2018, 11:00 at CBF headquarters in Rio de Janeiro.

=== Matches ===
The first legs were played on 12 September and the second legs were played on 26 September 2018.

Team 1	Agg.	Team 2	1st leg	2nd leg
Flamengo (Rio de Janeiro (state))	1–2	(São Paulo (state)) Corinthians	0–0	1–2
Palmeiras (São Paulo (state))	1–2	(Minas Gerais) Cruzeiro	0–1	1–1

All times are Brasília time, BRT (UTC−3)

=== Match 88 ===
12 September 2018
21:45

Flamengo (Rio de Janeiro (state))	0–0	(São Paulo (state)) Corinthians
	Report

Maracanã, Rio de Janeiro
Attendance: 53,303
Referee: Bráulio da Silva Machado (Santa Catarina)

26 September 2018
21:45

Corinthians (São Paulo (state))	2–1	(Rio de Janeiro (state)) Flamengo
Danilo Avelar 14'; Pedrinho 69'	Report	Henrique 18' (o.g.)

Arena Corinthians, São Paulo
Attendance: 44,249
Referee: Ricardo Marques (Minas Gerais)

Corinthians won 2–1 on aggregate and advanced to the finals.

=== Match 89 ===
12 September 2018
21:45

Palmeiras (São Paulo (state))	0–1	(Minas Gerais) Cruzeiro
	Report	Barcos 5'

Allianz Parque, São Paulo
Attendance: 32,960
Referee: Wagner Reway (Mato Grosso)

26 September 2018
21:45

Cruzeiro (Minas Gerais)	1–1	(São Paulo (state)) Palmeiras
Barcos 26'	Report	Felipe Melo 49'

Mineirão, Belo Horizonte
Attendance: 44,681
Referee: Wagner do Nascimento Magalhães (Rio de Janeiro)

Cruzeiro won 2–1 on aggregate and advanced to the finals.

== Finals ==
=== Draw ===
The draw to determine the home-and-away teams for both legs was held on 27 September 2018, 14:30 at CBF headquarters in Rio de Janeiro.

=== Matches ===
The first leg was played on 10 October and the second leg was played on 17 October 2018.

Team 1	Agg.	Team 2	1st leg	2nd leg
Cruzeiro (Minas Gerais)	3–1	(São Paulo (state)) Corinthians	1–0	2–1

All times are Brasília time, BRT (UTC−3)

=== Match 90 ===
10 October 2018
21:45

Cruzeiro (Minas Gerais)	1–0	(São Paulo (state)) Corinthians
Thiago Neves 45'	Report

Mineirão, Belo Horizonte
Attendance: 53,368
Referee: Anderson Daronco (Rio Grande do Sul)

17 October 2018
21:45

Corinthians (São Paulo (state))	1–2	(Minas Gerais) Cruzeiro
Jádson 54' (pen.)	Report	Robinho 27'; De Arrascaeta 81'

Arena Corinthians, São Paulo
Attendance: 46,571
Referee: Wagner do Nascimento Magalhães (Rio de Janeiro)
