= Weverson (footballer, born 1987) =

Brazilian footballer

Personal information
- Full name: Weverson Eron Maldonado Saffiotti
- Date of birth: 7 January 1987
- Place of birth: Caraguatatuba, Brazil
- Date of death: 11 August 2006 (aged 19)
- Place of death: São Lourenço da Serra, Brazil
- Position: Goalkeeper

Youth career
- 1999–2006: São Paulo

Senior career*
Years	Team	Apps	(Gls)
2006	São Paulo		
- * Club domestic league appearances and goals as of 27 February 2024

Weverson Eron Maldonado Saffiotti (7 January 1987 – 11 August 2006), simply known as Weverson, was a Brazilian professional footballer who played as a goalkeeper.

== Career ==
Playing in São Paulo's youth categories since 1999, Weverson won several titles playing for the club, such as the 2001 Gothia Cup and 2002 Campeonato Paulista Sub-15. In 2006, he was promoted to the club's professional team, training as fourth goalkeeper.

== Death ==
Weverson died in a car accident, on 11 August 2006, suffered alongside another São Paulo reserve goalkeeper, Bruno Landgraf, who ended up paraplegic (and later became a Paralympic sailor), and the Finasa Osasco volleyball player Natália Lani Sena Manfrim who also died, in addition to Clarisse Peixoto and Paula Carbonari who left without major injuries.

== See also ==
- List of association football players who died during their careers
