= Weverson (footballer, born 1988) =

Brazilian footballer

Personal information
- Full name: Weverson Patrick Rodrigues de Oliveira
- Date of birth: 3 June 1988 (age 38)
- Place of birth: Campina Grande, Brazil
- Height: 1.86 m (6 ft 1 in)
- Position: Midfielder

Youth career
- Clube Atlético Paranaense

Senior career*
Years	Team	Apps	(Gls)
2006–2007	Treze		
2007–2008	Os Belenenses	0	(0)
2008–2010	Treze		
2008–2009	Vila Nova		
2010	Treze		
2013	Bahia de Feria		
2014–	Potiguar Mossoró		
- * Club domestic league appearances and goals as of 14:19, 9 June 2012 (UTC)

Weverson Patrick Rodrigues de Oliveira better known as Weverson (born 3 June 1988) is a Brazilian football defender who has played professionally in Brazil and Europe.

== Career ==
Born in Campina Grande, Weverson began playing football in the youth system of local side Clube Atlético Paranaense. He made his professional debut with Treze Futebol Clube, and made a move to Portuguese Primeira Liga club C.F. Os Belenenses on a three-year contract at age 19. However, he did not settle with the club and returned to Treze where he has spent the majority of his career, winning the state league and cup double in 2010 and appearing in the Copa do Brasil.

In June 2012, Weverson signed a two-year contract with Czech team SK Sigma Olomouc, but the club cancelled the contract before he officially joined the club.

Weverson played for Associação Desportiva Bahia de Feira in the 2013 Campeonato Baiano before joining Associação Cultural e Desportiva Potiguar for the 2014 Campeonato Potiguar.

== Clubs ==
- Clube Atletico Paranaense (2005–2006)
- C.F. Os Belenenses (2007–2008)
- Treze (2008)
