= 2017 in Brazilian football =

Football in Brazil
- Season: 2017

The following article presents a summary of the 2017 football (soccer) season in Brazil, which was the 116th season of competitive football in the country.

== Campeonato Brasileiro Série A ==
The 2017 Campeonato Brasileiro Série A started on May 13, 2017, and concluded on December 3, 2017.

- Atlético Goianiense
- Atlético Mineiro
- Atlético Paranaense
- Avaí
- Bahia
- Botafogo
- Chapecoense
- Corinthians
- Coritiba
- Cruzeiro
- Flamengo
- Fluminense
- Grêmio
- Palmeiras
- Ponte Preta
- Santos
- São Paulo
- Sport
- Vasco da Gama
- Vitória

Pos	Team	Pld	W	D	L	GF	GA	GD	Pts	Qualification or relegation
1	Corinthians (C)	38	21	9	8	50	30	+20	72	Qualification for Copa Libertadores group stage
2	Palmeiras	38	19	6	13	61	45	+16	63	Qualification for Copa Libertadores group stage
3	Santos	38	17	12	9	42	32	+10	63	Qualification for Copa Libertadores group stage
4	Grêmio	38	18	8	12	55	36	+19	62	Qualification for Copa Libertadores group stage
5	Cruzeiro	38	15	12	11	47	39	+8	57	Qualification for Copa Libertadores group stage
6	Flamengo	38	15	11	12	49	38	+11	56	Qualification for Copa Libertadores group stage
7	Vasco da Gama	38	15	11	12	40	47	−7	56	Qualification for Copa Libertadores second stage
8	Chapecoense	38	15	9	14	47	49	−2	54	Qualification for Copa Libertadores second stage
9	Atlético Mineiro	38	14	12	12	52	49	+3	54	Qualification for Copa Sudamericana first stage
10	Botafogo	38	14	11	13	45	42	+3	53	Qualification for Copa Sudamericana first stage
11	Atlético Paranaense	38	14	9	15	45	43	+2	51	Qualification for Copa Sudamericana first stage
12	Bahia	38	13	11	14	50	48	+2	50	Qualification for Copa Sudamericana first stage
13	São Paulo	38	13	11	14	48	49	−1	50	Qualification for Copa Sudamericana first stage
14	Fluminense	38	11	14	13	50	53	−3	47	Qualification for Copa Sudamericana first stage
15	Sport	38	12	9	17	46	58	−12	45	
16	Vitória	38	11	10	17	50	58	−8	43	
17	Coritiba (R)	38	11	10	17	42	51	−9	43	Relegation to Campeonato Brasileiro Série B
18	Avaí (R)	38	10	13	15	29	48	−19	43	Relegation to Campeonato Brasileiro Série B
19	Ponte Preta (R)	38	10	9	19	37	52	−15	39	Relegation to Campeonato Brasileiro Série B
20	Atlético Goianiense (R)	38	9	9	20	38	56	−18	36	Relegation to Campeonato Brasileiro Série B

Source: CBF
Rules for classification: 1) points; 2) wins; 3) goal difference; 4) goals scored; 5) head-to-head results; 6) least red cards received; 7) least yellow cards received; 8) draw.
(C) Champions; (R) Relegated

Corinthians won the Campeonato Brasileiro Série A.

=== Relegation ===
The four worst placed teams, which are Coritiba, Avaí, Ponte Preta and Atlético Goianiense, were relegated to the following year's second level.

== Campeonato Brasileiro Série B ==
The 2017 Campeonato Brasileiro Série B started on May 12, 2017, and concluded on November 25, 2017.

- ABC
- América Mineiro
- Boa Esporte
- Brasil de Pelotas
- Ceará
- CRB
- Criciúma
- Figueirense
- Goiás
- Guarani
- Internacional
- Juventude
- Londrina
- Luverdense
- Náutico
- Oeste
- Paraná
- Paysandu
- Santa Cruz
- Vila Nova

Pos	Team	Pld	W	D	L	GF	GA	GD	Pts	Promotion or relegation
1	América Mineiro (C, P)	38	20	13	5	46	25	+21	73	Promotion to 2018 Campeonato Brasileiro Série A
2	Internacional (P)	38	20	11	7	54	26	+28	71	Promotion to 2018 Campeonato Brasileiro Série A
3	Ceará (P)	38	19	10	9	46	32	+14	67	Promotion to 2018 Campeonato Brasileiro Série A
4	Paraná (P)	38	18	10	10	49	28	+21	64	Promotion to 2018 Campeonato Brasileiro Série A
5	Londrina	38	18	8	12	56	46	+10	62	
6	Oeste	38	14	17	7	43	31	+12	59	
7	Vila Nova	38	15	13	10	38	30	+8	58	
8	Brasil de Pelotas	38	15	6	17	43	50	−7	51	
9	Juventude	38	13	12	13	35	38	−3	51	
10	Boa Esporte	38	12	14	12	40	42	−2	50	
11	Paysandu	38	13	9	16	41	41	0	48	
12	Figueirense	38	12	12	14	44	49	−5	48	
13	Criciúma	38	12	12	14	41	46	−5	48	
14	Goiás	38	12	9	17	35	46	−11	45	
15	CRB	38	12	9	17	35	50	−15	45	
16	Guarani	38	11	11	16	36	46	−10	44	
17	Luverdense (R)	38	10	14	14	38	40	−2	44	Relegation to 2018 Campeonato Brasileiro Série C
18	Santa Cruz (R)	38	8	13	17	43	54	−11	37	Relegation to 2018 Campeonato Brasileiro Série C
19	ABC (R)	38	9	7	22	28	49	−21	34	Relegation to 2018 Campeonato Brasileiro Série C
20	Náutico (R)	38	8	8	22	29	51	−22	32	Relegation to 2018 Campeonato Brasileiro Série C

Updated to match(es) played on 25 November 2017. Source: CBF, Soccerway
Rules for classification: 1) points; 2) wins; 3) goal difference; 4) goals scored; 5) head-to-head results; 6) least red cards received; 7) least yellow cards received; 8) draw.
(C) Champions; (P) Promoted; (R) Relegated

América Mineiro won the Campeonato Brasileiro Série B.

=== Promotion ===
The four best placed teams, which are América Mineiro, Internacional, Ceará and Paraná, were promoted to the following year's first level.

=== Relegation ===
The four worst placed teams, which are Luverdense, Santa Cruz, ABC and Náutico, were relegated to the following year's third level.

== Campeonato Brasileiro Série C ==
The 2017 Campeonato Brasileiro Série C started on May 14, 2017, and concluded on October 21, 2017.

- ASA
- Bragantino
- Botafogo (PB)
- Botafogo (SP)
- Confiança
- CSA
- Cuiabá
- Fortaleza
- Joinville
- Macaé
- Moto Club
- Mogi Mirim
- Remo
- Salgueiro
- Sampaio Corrêa
- São Bento
- Tombense
- Tupi
- Volta Redonda
- Ypiranga

The Campeonato Brasileiro Série C final was played between CSA and Fortaleza.

October 14, 2017

Fortaleza	1–2	CSA

Castelão, Fortaleza

October 21, 2017

CSA	0–0	Fortaleza

Rei Pelé, Maceió

CSA won the league after beating Fortaleza

=== Promotion ===
The four best placed teams, CSA, Fortaleza, São Bento and Sampaio Corrêa, were promoted to the following year's second level.

=== Relegation ===
The four worst placed teams, Moto Club, Macaé, Mogi Mirim and ASA, were relegated to the following year's fourth level.

== Campeonato Brasileiro Série D ==
The 2017 Campeonato Brasileiro Série D started on May 21, 2017, and concluded on September 10, 2017.

- Altos
- América de Natal
- América (PE)
- Anápolis
- Aparecidense
- Atlético Acreano
- Atlético Pernambucano
- Audax
- Bangu
- Baré
- Boavista
- Brusque
- Caldense
- Campinense
- Ceilândia
- Central
- Comercial (MS)
- Cordino
- Coruripe
- Desportiva Ferroviária
- Espírito Santo
- Fast Clube
- Fluminense de Feira
- Foz do Iguaçu
- Genus
- Globo
- Guarani de Juazeiro
- Guarany de Sobral
- Gurupi
- Inter de Lages
- Itabaiana
- Ituano
- Itumbiara
- Jacobina
- Juazeirense
- Luziânia
- Maranhão
- Metropolitano
- Murici
- Novo Hamburgo
- Operário Ferroviário
- Parnahyba
- Portuguesa (RJ)
- Portuguesa (SP)
- Potiguar
- Princesa do Solimões
- PSTC
- Real Ariquemes
- Red Bull Brasil
- Rio Branco (AC)
- River
- Santos (AP)
- São Bernardo
- São Francisco
- São José (RS)
- São Paulo (RS)
- São Raimundo (PA)
- São Raimundo (RR)
- Sergipe
- Sete de Dourados
- Sinop
- Sousa
- Tocantins de Miracema
- Trem
- União Rondonópolis
- URT
- Villa Nova
- XV de Piracicaba

The Campeonato Brasileiro Série D final was played between Operário Ferroviário and Globo.

September 3, 2017

Globo	0–5	Operário Ferroviário

Barrettão, Ceará-Mirim

September 10, 2017

Operário Ferroviário	0–1	Globo

Estádio Germano Krüger, Ponta Grossa

Operário Ferroviário won the league after beating Globo

=== Promotion ===
The four best placed teams, Operário Ferroviário, Globo, Atlético Acreano and Juazeirense, were promoted to the following year's third level.

== Domestic cups ==
=== Copa do Brasil ===
The 2017 Copa do Brasil started on February 8, 2017, and concluded on September 27, 2017. The Copa do Brasil final was played between Flamengo and Cruzeiro.

September 7, 2017

Flamengo	1–1	Cruzeiro

Maracanã, Rio de Janeiro

September 27, 2017

Cruzeiro	0–0	Flamengo
Penalties
	5–3

Mineirão, Belo Horizonte

Cruzeiro won the cup after defeating Flamengo.

=== Copa do Nordeste ===
The competition featured 20 clubs from the Northeastern region. It started on January 24, 2017 and concluded on May 24, 2017. The Copa do Nordeste final was played between Bahia and Sport.

May 17, 2017

Sport	1–1	Bahia

Estádio Ilha do Retiro, Recife

May 24, 2017

Bahia	1–0	Sport

Arena Fonte Nova, Salvador

Bahia won the cup after defeating Sport.

=== Copa Verde ===
The competition featured 18 clubs from the North and Central-West regions, including the Espírito Santo champions. It started on January 29, 2017 and concluded on May 16, 2017. The Copa Verde final was played between Luverdense and Paysandu.

May 4, 2017

Luverdense	3–1	Paysandu

Arena Pantanal, Cuiabá

May 16, 2017

Paysandu	1–1	Luverdense

Mangueirão, Belém

Luverdense won the cup after defeating Paysandu.

=== Primeira Liga ===
The competition features 12 clubs from the South and Southeastern regions, including Minas Gerais and Rio de Janeiro State teams. It started on January 24, 2017 and concluded on October 8, 2017. The Primeira Liga final was played between Londrina and Atlético Mineiro.

October 8, 2017

Londrina	0–0	Atlético Mineiro
Penalties
	4–2

Estádio do Café, Londrina

Londrina won the cup after defeating Atlético Mineiro.

== State championship champions ==
State	Champion
(Acre (state)) Acre	Atlético Acreano
Alagoas	CRB
Amapá	Santos
(Amazonas (Brazilian state)) Amazonas	Manaus
Bahia	Vitória
Ceará	Ceará
(Federal District (Brazil)) Distrito Federal	Brasiliense
Espírito Santo	Atlético Itapemirim
Goiás	Goiás
Maranhão	Sampaio Corrêa
Mato Grosso	Cuiabá
Mato Grosso do Sul	Corumbaense
Minas Gerais	Atlético Mineiro
Pará	Paysandu
Paraíba	Botafogo
(Paraná (state)) Paraná	Coritiba
Pernambuco	Sport
Piauí	Altos
(Rio de Janeiro (state)) Rio de Janeiro	Flamengo
Rio Grande do Norte	ABC
Rio Grande do Sul	Novo Hamburgo
Rondônia	Real Ariquemes
Roraima	São Raimundo
(Santa Catarina (state)) Santa Catarina	Chapecoense
(São Paulo (state)) São Paulo	Corinthians
Sergipe	Confiança
Tocantins	Interporto

== State cup competition champions ==
Competition	Champion
Copa Espírito Santo	Atlético Itapemirim
Copa Fares Lopes	Floresta
Copa FGF	São José
Copa FMF	União Rondonópolis
Copa Paraná	Maringá
Copa Paulista	Ferroviária
Copa Piauí	4 de Julho
Copa Rio	Boavista
Copa Santa Catarina	Atlético Tubarão

== Youth competition champions ==
Competition	Champion
Campeonato Brasileiro de Aspirantes	Internacional
Campeonato Brasileiro de Seleções Estaduais Sub-20	State of Rio Grande do Sul
Campeonato Brasileiro Sub-20	Cruzeiro
Copa do Brasil Sub-17^{(1)}	Palmeiras
Copa do Brasil Sub-20	Atlético Mineiro
Copa RS de Futebol Sub-20	São Paulo
Copa Santiago de Futebol Juvenil	Internacional
Copa São Paulo de Futebol Júnior	Corinthians
Supercopa do Brasil Sub-20	Cruzeiro
Taça Belo Horizonte de Juniores	São Paulo

^{(1)} The Copa Nacional do Espírito Santo Sub-17, between 2008 and 2012, was named Copa Brasil Sub-17. The similar named Copa do Brasil Sub-17 is organized by the Brazilian Football Confederation and it was first played in 2013.

== Brazilian clubs in international competitions ==
Team	2017 Copa Libertadores	2017 Copa Sudamericana	2017 Recopa Sudamericana	2017 Suruga Bank Championship	2017 FIFA Club World Cup
Atlético Mineiro	Round of 16 eliminated by (Bolivia) Jorge Wilstermann	N/A	N/A	N/A	N/A
Atlético Paranaense	Round of 16 eliminated by (Brazil) Santos	N/A	N/A	N/A	N/A
Botafogo	Quarterfinals eliminated by (Brazil) Grêmio	N/A	N/A	N/A	N/A
Chapecoense	Eliminated in the group stage	Round of 16 eliminated by (Brazil) Flamengo	Runners-up lost to (Colombia) Atlético Nacional	Runners-up lost to (Japan) Urawa Red Diamonds	N/A
Corinthians	N/A	Round of 16 eliminated by (Argentina) Racing	N/A	N/A	N/A
Cruzeiro	N/A	First Stage eliminated by (Paraguay) Nacional	N/A	N/A	N/A
Flamengo	Eliminated in the group stage	Runners-up lost to (Argentina) Independiente	N/A	N/A	N/A
Fluminense	N/A	Quarterfinals eliminated by (Brazil) Flamengo	N/A	N/A	N/A
Grêmio	Champions defeated (Argentina) Lanús	N/A	N/A	N/A	Runners-up lost to (Spain) Real Madrid
Palmeiras	Round of 16 eliminated by (Ecuador) Barcelona	N/A	N/A	N/A	N/A
Ponte Preta	N/A	Round of 16 eliminated by (Brazil) Sport	N/A	N/A	N/A
Santos	Quarterfinals eliminated by (Ecuador) Barcelona	N/A	N/A	N/A	N/A
São Paulo	N/A	First Stage eliminated by (Argentina) Defensa y Justicia	N/A	N/A	N/A
Sport	N/A	Quarterfinals eliminated by (Colombia) Junior	N/A	N/A	N/A

== Brazil national team ==
The following table lists all the games played by the Brazilian national team in official competitions and friendly matches during 2017.

=== Friendlies ===
January 25	Brazil	1–0	Colombia	Rio de Janeiro, Brazil
21:45 (UTC−3)	Dudu 47'	Report		Stadium: Estádio Olímpico Nilton Santos; Attendance: 18,695; Referee: Jorge Baliño (Argentina)

June 13	Australia	0–4	Brazil	Melbourne, Australia
07:05 (UTC−3)		Report	Diego Souza 1', 90+3'; Thiago Silva 62'; Taison 75'	Stadium: Melbourne Cricket Ground; Attendance: 49,874; Referee: Mark Clattenburg (England)

November 10	Japan	1–3	Brazil	Villeneuve d'Ascq, France
10:00 (UTC−2)	Makino 63'	Report	Neymar 10' (pen.); Marcelo 17'; Gabriel Jesus 36'	Stadium: Stade Pierre-Mauroy; Referee: Benoît Bastien (France)

November 14	England	0–0	Brazil	London, England
18:00 (UTC−2)		Report		Stadium: Wembley Stadium; Attendance: 84,595; Referee: Artur Dias Soares (Portugal)

=== 2018 FIFA World Cup qualification ===
March 23	Uruguay	1–4	Brazil	Montevideo, Uruguay
20:00 UTC−3	Cavani 9' (pen.)	Report (FIFA); Report (CONMEBOL)	Paulinho 19', 52', 90+2'; Neymar 74'	Stadium: Estadio Centenario; Referee: Patricio Loustau (Argentina)

March 28	Brazil	3–0	Paraguay	São Paulo, Brazil
21:45 UTC−3	Coutinho 34'; Neymar 64'; Marcelo 85'	Report (FIFA); Report (CONMEBOL)		Stadium: Arena Corinthians; Referee: Víctor Carrillo (Peru)

August 31	Brazil	2–0	Ecuador	Porto Alegre, Brazil
21:45 UTC−3	Paulinho 69'; Coutinho 76'	Report (FIFA); Report (CONMEBOL)		Stadium: Arena do Grêmio; Attendance: 36,689; Referee: Mario Díaz de Vivar (Paraguay)

September 4	Colombia	1–1	Brazil	Barranquilla, Colombia
15:30 UTC−5	Falcao 56'	Report (FIFA); Report (CONMEBOL)	Willian 45+2'	Stadium: Estadio Metropolitano Roberto Meléndez; Attendance: 47,500; Referee: Jesús Valenzuela (Venezuela)

October 5	Bolivia	0–0	Brazil	La Paz, Bolivia
16:00 UTC−4		Report (FIFA); Report (CONMEBOL)		Stadium: Estadio Hernando Siles; Attendance: 34,725; Referee: Fernando Rapallini (Argentina)

October 10	Brazil	3–0	Chile	São Paulo, Brazil
21:45 UTC−3	Paulinho 55'; Gabriel Jesus 57', 90+2'	Report (FIFA); Report (CONMEBOL)		Stadium: Allianz Parque; Attendance: 41,008; Referee: Roddy Zambrano (Ecuador)

=== Superclásico de las Américas ===
June 9	Brazil	0–1	Argentina	Melbourne, Australia
07:05 UTC−3		Report	Mercado 45'	Stadium: Melbourne Cricket Ground; Attendance: 95,569; Referee: Chris Beath (Australia)

== Women's football ==
=== National team ===
The following table lists all the games played by the Brazil women's national football team in official competitions and friendly matches during 2017.

==== Friendlies ====
April 9	Brazil	6–0	Bolivia	Manaus, Brazil
20:30 (BRT)	Francielle 6'; Cristiane 24'; Marta 43'; Bruna Benites 58'; Morón 64' (o.g.); Thaisa 83'	Report		Stadium: Arena da Amazônia; Attendance: 16,198; Referee: Deborah Cecília Cruz Correia (Brazil)

June 10	Spain	1–2	Brazil	Fuenlabrada, Spain
18:30 (CEST)	Losada 20' (pen.)	Report	Darlene 76'; Rafaelle 88'	Stadium: Estadio Fernando Torres; Referee: Sandra Braz Bastos (Portugal)

June 13	Iceland	0–1	Brazil	Reykjavík, Iceland
18:30 (WET)		Report	Marta 67'	Stadium: Laugardalsvöllur; Referee: Tess Olofsson (Sweden)

July 4	Germany	3–1	Brazil	Sandhausen, Germany
17:45 (CEST)	Dallmann 30'; Kayikçi 65'; Maier 78'	Report	Ludmila 49'	Stadium: BWT-Stadion am Hardtwald; Referee: Amy Fearn (England)

September 16	Australia	2–1	Brazil	Penrith, Australia
15:00 (AEST)	De Vanna 41'; Kerr 67'	Report	Debinha 79'	Stadium: Pepper Stadium; Attendance: 15,089; Referee: Anna-Marie Keighley (New Zealand)

September 19	Australia	3–2	Brazil	Newcastle, Australia
19:30 (AEST)	Kerr 38', 66'; Foord 47'	Report	Fabiana 1'; Marta 86' (pen.)	Stadium: McDonald Jones Stadium; Attendance: 16,829; Referee: Lara Lee (Australia)

November 25	Chile	0–4	Brazil	Ovalle, Chile
20:00 (CLST)		Report	Érika 3'; Rafaelle 5'; Bia Zaneratto 24'; Marta 65' (pen.)	Stadium: Estadio Diaguita; Referee: María Laura Fortunato (Argentina)

November 28	Chile	0–3	Brazil	La Serena, Chile
20:00 (CLST)		Report	Bia Zaneratto 9'; Thaís 16'; Debinha 26'	Stadium: Estadio La Portada; Referee: María Laura Fortunato (Argentina)

==== Tournament of Nations ====
July 27	Brazil	1–1	Japan	Seattle, United States
16:15 (PDT)	Camila 87'	Report	Momiki 63'	Stadium: CenturyLink Field; Attendance: 9,725; Referee: Karen Abt (United States)

July 30	United States	4–3	Brazil	San Diego, United States
17:00 (PDT)	Mewis 18'; Press 80'; Rapinoe 85'; Ertz 89'	Report	Andressinha 2', 78'; Bruna Benites 63'	Stadium: Qualcomm Stadium; Attendance: 21,096; Referee: Melissa Borjas (Honduras)

August 3	Australia	6–1	Brazil	Carson, United States
16:15 (PDT)	De Vanna 7', 34'; Foord 32', 68'; Gorry 41'; Kerr 81'	Report	Camila 2'	Stadium: StubHub Center; Attendance: 11,948; Referee: Christina Unkel (United States)

==== Yongchuan International Tournament ====
October 19	Brazil	3–0	Mexico	Chongqing, China
16:00 (CST)	Marta 54'; Bruna Benites 58'; Bia Zaneratto 76'	Report		Stadium: Yongchuan Sports Center; Referee: Gu Chunhan (China)

October 21	Brazil	2–0	North Korea	Chongqing, China
16:00 (CST)	Marta 16', 30'	Report		Stadium: Yongchuan Sports Center; Referee: Law Bik-chi (Hong Kong)

October 24	China	2–2	Brazil	Chongqing, China
19:35 (CST)	Wang Shanshan 54', 58'	Report	Marta 32' (pen.); Adriana 34'	Stadium: Yongchuan Sports Center; Referee: Law Bik-chi (Hong Kong)

The Brazil women's national football team competed in the following competitions in 2017:

Competition	Performance
Tournament of Nations	Fourth Place
Yongchuan International Tournament	Champions

== Campeonato Brasileiro de Futebol Feminino Série A1 ==
The 2017 Campeonato Brasileiro de Futebol Feminino Série A1 started on March 12, 2017, and concluded on July 20, 2017.

- Audax
- Corinthians
- Ferroviária
- Flamengo/Marinha
- Foz Cataratas
- Grêmio
- Iranduba
- Kindermann
- Ponte Preta
- Rio Preto
- Santos
- São Francisco
- São José
- Sport
- Vitória
- Vitória das Tabocas

The Campeonato Brasileiro de Futebol Feminino Série A1 final was played between Santos and Corinthians.

July 13, 2017

Santos	2–0	Corinthians

Estádio Vila Belmiro, Santos

July 20, 2017

Corinthians	0–1	Santos

Arena Barueri, Barueri

Santos won the league after defeating Corinthians.

=== Relegation ===
The two worst placed teams, Grêmio and Vitória, were relegated to the following year's second level.

== Campeonato Brasileiro de Futebol Feminino Série A2 ==
The 2017 Campeonato Brasileiro de Futebol Feminino Série A2 started on May 10, 2017, and concluded on July 26, 2017.

- Aliança
- América Mineiro
- Botafogo (PB)
- Caucaia
- Centro Olímpico
- CRESSPOM
- Duque de Caixas
- JV Lideral
- Mixto
- Náutico
- Pinheirense
- Portuguesa (SP)
- Tiradentes
- Tuna Luso
- UDA
- Viana

The Campeonato Brasileiro de Futebol Feminino Série A2 final was played between Pinheirense and Portuguesa.

July 19, 2017

Portuguesa (SP)	1–2	Pinheirense

Estádio do Canindé, São Paulo

July 26, 2017

Pinheirense	0–1	Portuguesa (SP)

Estádio da Curuzú, Belém

Pinheirense won the league after defeating Portuguesa (SP).

=== Promotion ===
The two best placed teams, which are Pinheirense and Portuguesa (SP), were promoted to the following year's first level.

== Domestic competition champions ==
Competition	Champion
Campeonato Carioca	Flamengo/Marinha
Campeonato Paulista	Rio Preto

== Brazilian clubs in international competitions ==
Team	2017 Copa Libertadores Femenina
Corinthians/Audax	Champions defeated (Chile) Colo Colo
