= Mailson (footballer, born 1990) =

Brazilian footballer

Personal information
- Full name: Mailson Francisco de Farías
- Date of birth: 23 December 1993 (age 32)
- Place of birth: Brazil
- Height: 1.77 m (5 ft 9 1/2 in)
- Position: Winger

Team information
- Current team: Jacuipense

Senior career*
Years	Team	Apps	(Gls)
2012	Camboriú	0	(0)
2012	Morrinhos	0	(0)
2013	Itumbiara	0	(0)
2013–2014	Alcanenense	8	(2)
2014	Caxias	7	(2)
2014	Chapecoense	4	(0)
2015	Caxias	0	(0)
2015–2016	Juventude	13	(2)
2016–2017	Paysandu	19	(0)
2017	→ CRB (loan)	6	(1)
2017–2018	Jeju United	2	(0)
2018	Criciúma	19	(3)
2018	Al-Arabi	14	(2)
2019	CRB	3	(0)
2019	Vila Nova	17	(0)
2020	Chiangrai United	4	(0)
2020	Sampaio Corrêa	7	(0)
2021–	Jacuipense	2	(0)
- * Club domestic league appearances and goals as of 14:56, 2 December 2019 (UTC)

Mailson Francisco de Farías (born 23 December 1990) is a Brazilian footballer who plays as a winger for Jacuipense.

== Club career ==
Mailson started his senior professional career with Camboriu and in the following years, he represented lower-tier clubs. He also had a stint with Portuguese club Alcanenense. On 1 August 2014, he signed for Série A (top tier) club Chapecoense.

After a stint with Juventude, Mailson signed for Paysandu of Série B on 23 June 2016. In 2017, he joined CRB on a loan deal. He scored his first goal in a 1–1 draw against Luverdense. In July, his contract was terminated.

In August 2017, Mailson signed for the South Korean club Jeju United. He made his debut on 13 August, in a 2–0 victory over Gangwon.

In January 2018, Mailson joined the Brazilian club Criciúma EC.

== Honours ==
Chiangrai United

- Thailand Champions Cup (1): 2020
