= Weverton (footballer, born 1993) =

Brazilian footballer

Personal information
- Full name: Weverton Nunes Coelho
- Date of birth: 25 August 1993 (age 33)
- Place of birth: Manaus, Brazil
- Height: 1.66 m (5 ft 5 in)
- Position: Forward

Team information
- Current team: São Raimundo-AM

Youth career
- –2012: Nacional-AM

Senior career*
Years	Team	Apps	(Gls)
2012–2015	Nacional-AM		
2013–2014	→ Holanda-AM (loan)		
2015	Fast Clube		
2016–2017	Princesa do Solimões		
2017	Fortaleza		
2018	Cuiabá		
2018–2019	Brusque		
2019	Sergipe		
2020	Cianorte		
2020	Operário-MT		
2021	Rio Branco-PR		
2021	Murici		
2021–2023	Manauara		
2022	→ Rio Negro-AM (loan)		
2024	Amazonas		
2024	→ Princesa do Solimões (loan)		
2024	Fast Clube		
2025–	São Raimundo-AM		
- * Club domestic league appearances and goals as of 14 January 2025

Weverton Nunes Coelho (born 25 August 1993), simply known as Weverton, is a Brazilian professional footballer who plays as a forward for São Raimundo-AM.

== Career ==
Weverton started his career at Nacional, where he was state champion in 2015. In the second semester, he transferred to Fast Clube and was again champion, this time of the Copa Amazonas. In 2017, playing for Princesa do Solimões, he was top scorer in Série D, having a quick spell at Fortaleza after the end of the competition. In 2018 he won another state championship, this time with Cuiabá EC, and the Copa Santa Catarina with Brusque.

After playing for a few more clubs outside of Amazonas, he returned to his home state of Manauara EC, where he was champion of the second state division. On loan, he repeated the feat in 2022 at Rio Negro. On 4 January 2024, he was announced as a new reinforcement for Amazonas FC.

For the 2025 season, Weverton signed a contract with São Raimundo-AM.

== Honours ==
Nacional

- Campeonato Amazonense: 2015

Fast Clube

- Copa Amazonas: 2015

Cuiabá

- Campeonato Matogrossense: 2018

Brusque

- Copa Santa Catarina: 2018

Manauara

- Campeonato Amazonense Second Division: 2021

Rio Negro

- Campeonato Amazonense Second Division: 2022

Individual

- 2017 Campeonato Brasileiro Série D top scorer: 9 goals
