= Holanda Esporte Clube =

Holanda
- Full name: Holanda Esporte Clube
- Nicknames: Laranja mecânica Time (da) Laranja
- Founded: 24 October 1984; 41 years ago (as Curumim); 21 October 2007; 18 years ago (as Holanda)
- Ground: Estádio Francisco Garcia, Rio Preto da Eva, Amazonas state, Brazil
- Capacity: 8,000
- President: Paulo Radim Souza
- Website: http://www.holandaclube.com/
Home colors	Away colors

Holanda Esporte Clube, commonly known as Holanda, is a Brazilian football club based in Rio Preto da Eva, Amazonas. They won the Campeonato Amazonense once and competed in the Série C and in the Copa do Brasil once.

== History ==
The club was founded on 24 October 1984 as Curumim. After they became a professional team, the club was founded again on 21 October 2007 as Holanda Esporte Clube. They won the Campeonato Amazonense Second Level in 2007 and the Campeonato Amazonense in 2008. Holanda competed in the Série C in 2008, when the club was eliminated in the Second Stage. The team competed in the Copa do Brasil in 2009, when they were eliminated in the First Stage by Coritiba.

== Stadium ==
Holanda Esporte Clube play their home games at Estádio Francisco Garcia, commonly known as Chicão. The stadium has a maximum capacity of 8,000 people.

== Honours ==
- Campeonato Amazonense
  - Winners (1): 2008
- Campeonato Amazonense Second Level
  - Winners (2): 2007, 2017
- Taça Cidade de Manaus
  - Winners (1): 2008
