= Mazinho (footballer, born 1989) =

Brazilian footballer

Personal information
- Full name: José Osmar Ventura da Paz
- Date of birth: 10 November 1989 (age 37)
- Place of birth: Santana do Ipanema, Brazil
- Height: 1.81 m (5 ft 11 in)
- Position: Midfielder

Team information
- Current team: Paraná

Senior career*
Years	Team	Apps	(Gls)
2009–2013	Ipanema	0	(0)
2013	→ CEO (loan)	0	(0)
2013	América–RN	9	(1)
2014–2016	Coruripe	23	(1)
2016	Sergipe	2	(0)
2016	CEO	0	(0)
2017	ASA	34	(3)
2018	CSA	0	(0)
2018–2019	Ferroviário	71	(12)
2019	São Caetano	9	(2)
2020	Ferroviária	10	(0)
2020–2021	Operário Ferroviário	18	(2)
2021–	Paraná	3	(0)
- * Club domestic league appearances and goals as of 13:01, 11 August 2020 (UTC)

José Osmar Ventura da Paz (born 10 November 1989), known by his nickname Mazinho, is a Brazilian footballer who currently plays as a midfielder for Paraná.

== Career statistics ==
=== Club ===
As of 11 August 2020

Club	Season	League			State League		Cup		Continental		Other		Total	
Club	Season	Division	Apps	Goals	Apps	Goals	Apps	Goals	Apps	Goals	Apps	Goals	Apps	Goals
América–RN	2013	Série B	9	1	–		–		–		–		9	1
Coruripe	2014	Série D	8	0	22	1	–		–		–		30	1
Coruripe	2015	Série D	10	1	14	1	–		–		5 (Note: Appearances in the Copa do Nordeste)	0	29	2
Coruripe	2016	Alagoano	–		15	0	2	0	–		5	0	22	0
Coruripe	Total		18	1	51	2	2	0	–		10	0	81	3
Sergipe	2016	Série D	2	0	–		–		–		–		2	0
ASA	2017	Série C	14	1	16	2	4	0	–		–		34	3
CSA	2018	Série B	–		–		–		–		0	0	0	0
Ferroviário	2018	Série D	13	3	7	1	6	3	–		–		26	7
Ferroviário	2019	Série C	18	2	14	0	1	0	–		–		33	2
Ferroviário	Total		31	5	21	1	7	3	–		–		59	9
São Caetano	2019	Série D	–		–		–		–		9 (Note: Appearances in the Copa Paulista)	2	9	2
Ferroviária	2020	Série D	–		7	0	3	0	–		–		10	0
Operário Ferroviário	2020	Série B	1	0	–		–		–		–		1	0
Career total			75	8	95	5	16	3	0	0	19	2	205	18
