= Rômulo (footballer, born April 1995) =

Brazilian footballer

Personal information
- Full name: Rômulo dos Santos de Souza
- Date of birth: 28 April 1995 (age 31)
- Place of birth: Rio de Janeiro, Brazil
- Height: 1.75 m (5 ft 9 in)
- Position: Forward

Team information
- Current team: Laguna

Youth career
- Avaí

Senior career*
Years	Team	Apps	(Gls)
2013	Artsul	15	(2)
2014–2021	Avaí	219	(44)
2018–2019	→ Al Dhafra (loan)	26	(11)
2021	Ittihad Kalba	9	(2)
2021–2023	Avaí	45	(1)
2023	CRB	25	(2)
2024	CSA	7	(0)
2024	Chapecoense	9	(0)
2026–	Laguna	7	(1)
- * Club domestic league appearances and goals as of 19 June 2026

Rômulo dos Santos de Souza (born 28 April 1995), simply known as Rômulo, is a Brazilian footballer who plays as a forward for Laguna.

== Club career ==
Born in Rio de Janeiro, Rômulo graduated with Avaí's youth setup. He made his professional debut on 18 November 2014, coming on as a second-half substitute in a 2–0 home win against Portuguesa for the Série B championship, also assisting Marquinhos in the first goal. He featured in one more match for the side, which achieved promotion to Série A.

Rômulo made his debut in the main category on 30 May 2015, replacing Anderson Lopes in a 2–1 away win against Coritiba. He scored his first goal in the division on 7 June, netting a last-minute winner in a 1–0 win at Goiás.
