= List of Brazilian North-Northeast football champions (1946–1993) =

Following is the list with the main North-Norweast competitions held before the creation of Copa do Nordeste, in 1994:

== Copa Cidade de Natal ==
This tournament was realized to comemore the installation of nocturnal light in the Estádio Juvenal Lamartine. All matches were played in this stadium.

Year	Champion	Runners-up
1946	(Ceará) Fortaleza	(Rio Grande do Norte) América de Natal

== Torneio Campeão dos Campeões do Norte ==
Triangular tournament (which also included the participation of Fortaleza EC). All matches were played in Estádio Santa Izabel, São Luís.

Year	Champion	Runners-up
1948	(Maranhão) Moto Club	(Pará) Paysandu

== Torneio dos Campeões do Nordeste ==
Tournament held in Recife, organized by the Federação Pernambucana de Futebol and Santa Cruz FC. The tournament included the participation of 1947 state champions from Alagoas (Alexandria), Bahia (EC Bahia), Ceará (Fortaleza), Paraíba (Botafogo), Pernambuco (Santa Cruz), Rio Grande do Norte (ABC) and Treze, representing Campina Grande.

Year	Champion	Runners-up
1948	Bahia	(Pernambuco) Santa Cruz

== Torneio dos Campeões do Norte-Nordeste ==
Tournament held in Recife, organized by the Federação Pernambucana de Futebol and Clube Náutico Capibaribe. The tournament included the participation of 1951 state champions from Alagoas (CRB), Bahia (Ypiranga), Ceará (Ceará SC), Paraíba (Treze), Pernambuco (Náutico), Rio Grande do Norte (América), Sergipe (Confiança) and Pará (Tuna Luso).

Year	Champion	Runners-up
1952	(Pernambuco) Náutico	(Pará) Tuna Luso

== Torneio Paraíba-Pernambuco ==
Interstate tournament of clubs from Paraíba and Pernambuco. 1967 edition is called "Torneio Quadrangular Festival da Bola".

Year	Champion	Runners-up
1953	(Paraíba) Botafogo	(Paraíba) Treze
1961	(Paraíba) Treze	(Pernambuco) Santa Cruz
1962	(Pernambuco) Santa Cruz	(Paraíba) Campinense
1967	(Paraíba) Botafogo	(Pernambuco) América (PE)

== Torneio Rio Grande do Norte-Paraíba ==
Interstate tournament of clubs from Paraíba and Rio Grande do Norte.

Year	Champion	Runners-up
1954	(Paraíba) Botafogo	(Paraíba) Treze
1961	(Rio Grande do Norte) Riachuelo	(Rio Grande do Norte) ABC
1962	(Paraíba) Campinense	(Rio Grande do Norte) ABC
1964	(Paraíba) Botafogo	(Paraíba) Auto Esporte
1980	(Paraíba) Treze	(Rio Grande do Norte) Alecrim
1983	(Rio Grande do Norte) ABC	(Paraíba) Botafogo

== Torneio Bahia-Pernambuco ==
Interstate tournament of clubs from Bahia and Pernambuco. The tournament featured the participation of eight teams (EC Bahia, Botafogo, Galícia and Vitória from Bahia and América, Náutico, Santa Cruz and Sport Recife from Pernambuco).

Year	Champion	Runners-up
1956	(Pernambuco) Santa Cruz	Bahia

== Zona Norte-Nordeste da Taça Brasil ==
Northern Zone of Taça Brasil. Considered the great predecessor of the current Copa do Nordeste.

Year	Champion	Runners-up
1959	Bahia	(Pernambuco) Sport Recife
1960	(Ceará) Fortaleza	Bahia
1961	Bahia	(Ceará) Fortaleza
1962	(Pernambuco) Sport Recife	(Paraíba) Campinense
1963	Bahia	(Pernambuco) Sport Recife
1964	Ceará	(Pernambuco) Náutico
1965	(Pernambuco) Náutico	(Bahia) Vitória
1966	(Pernambuco) Náutico	(Bahia) Vitória
1967	(Pernambuco) Náutico	(Ceará) América (CE)
1968	(Ceará) Fortaleza	Bahia

== Torneio Maranhão-Piauí ==
Interstate tournament of clubs from Maranhão and Piauí.

Torneio Marinho Rodrigues

Year	Champion	Runners-up
1964	(Maranhão) Sampaio Corrêa	(Piauí) Flamengo
1965	Maranhão	(Maranhão) Moto Club

Torneio Integração

Year	Champion	Runners-up
1980	(Piauí) Ríver	(Piauí) Flamengo

== Copa dos Campeões do Norte ==
Tournament held with the previous champions of Zona Norte-Nordeste da Taça Brasil.

Year	Champion	Runners-up
1966	(Pernambuco) Náutico	Ceará

== Torneio Hexagonal Norte-Nordeste ==
Competition that brought together champions and runners-up clubs from the states of Ceará, Pará and Pernambuco.

Year	Champion	Runners-up
1967	(Pernambuco) Santa Cruz	(Pará) Remo

== Torneio Norte-Nordeste ==
Year	Champion	Runners-up
1968	(Pernambuco) Sport Recife	(Pará) Remo
1969	Ceará	(Pará) Remo
1970	(Ceará) Fortaleza	(Pernambuco) Sport Recife

=== Grupo Norte do Torneio Norte-Nordeste ===
Part of Torneio Norte-Nordeste. Also called Torneio do Norte.

Year	Champion	Runners-up
1968	(Pará) Remo	Piauí
1969	(Pará) Remo	(Maranhão) Ferroviário (MA)
1970	(Amazonas (Brazilian state)) Fast Clube	(Pará) Tuna Luso

== Zona Norte-Nordeste da Segunda Divisão ==
According to the regulation, established by the Brazilian Sports Confederation-CBD, the champion teams of the north and northeast regions would decide the title of the North-Northeast Championship in two legs. Thus, the final phase of the North-Northeast Championship, in accordance with the regulations established by the aforementioned confederation, involved the champion teams of the North and Northeast regions. From there would come the winner of the tournament that would make the final of the Second Division with the champion of the Center-South Zone.

Year	Champion	Runners-up
1971	(Pará) Remo	(Sergipe) Itabaiana
1972	(Maranhão) Sampaio Corrêa	(Paraíba) Campinense

== Torneio Paraíba-Ceará ==
Interstate tournament of clubs from Ceará and Paraíba.

Year	Champion	Runners-up
1972	(Ceará) Icasa	(Paraíba) Campinense

== Torneio Pará-Maranhão ==
Interstate tournament of clubs from Maranhão and Pará.

Year	Champion	Runners-up
1972	(Maranhão) Moto Club	(Pará) Remo
1973	(Maranhão) Sampaio Corrêa	(Pará) Remo

== Taça Almir de Albuquerque ==
Tournament for the clubs from North and Northeast using the results of their matches in the first stage of 1973 Campeonato Brasileiro Série A.

Year	Champion	Runners-up
1973	(Rio Grande do Norte) América de Natal	(Amazonas (Brazilian state)) Rio Negro

== Torneio José Américo de Almeida Filho ==
Championship that brought together the champion teams of six states in the 1975 edition, and also the runners-up in the 1976 edition.

Year	Champion	Runners-up
1975	(Alagoas) CRB	(Paraíba) Botafogo
1976	(Bahia) Vitória	(Rio Grande do Norte) América de Natal

== Torneio Rio Grande do Norte-Pernambuco ==
Interstate tournament of clubs from Pernambuco and Rio Grande do Norte. All matches held in Castelão (Natal).

Year	Champion	Runners-up
1983	(Rio Grande do Norte) América de Natal	(Rio Grande do Norte) ABC

== See also ==
- Copa Alagipe
- Copa Integração
- Taça Asa Branca
