= Campeonato Brasileiro Série A =

Brazilian association football league

- Organising body: Brazilian Football Confederation
- Founded: 1959
- Country: Brazil
- Confederation: CONMEBOL
- Number of clubs: 20 (since 2006)
- Level on pyramid: 1
- Relegation to: Série B
- Domestic cups: Copa do Brasil; Supercopa do Brasil
- International cups: Copa Libertadores; Copa Sudamericana
- Current champions: Flamengo (9th title) (2026)
- Most championships: Palmeiras (12 titles)
- Most appearances: Fábio (744)
- Top scorer: Roberto Dinamite (190)
- Broadcasters: LIBRA teams TV Globo; SporTV; Premiere; LFU teams TV Globo; SporTV; Premiere; Record; CazéTV; Amazon Prime Video
- Current: 2026 Campeonato Brasileiro Série A

The Campeonato Brasileiro Série A (Brazilian Portuguese pronunciation: [kɐ̃pi.oˈnatu bɾaziˈlejɾu ˈsɛɾi ˈa, kɐ̃pjo-]; English: "Brazilian Championship A Series"), commonly referred to as the Brasileirão (pronounced [bɾazilejˈɾɐ̃w]; English: "Big Brazilian" or "Great Brazilian"), the Série A or the Brazilian Série A (to distinguish it from Italy's Serie A), is a professional association football league in Brazil and the highest level of the Brazilian football league system. Contested by 20 clubs, it operates on a system of promotion and relegation with the Campeonato Brasileiro Série B. In 2021, the competition was chosen by the IFFHS as the strongest national league in the world.

Due to historical peculiarities and the large geographical size of the country, Brazil has a relatively short history of nationwide football competitions. The main and most prestigious competitions were the state championships, run in each of the Brazilian states, with occasional inter-state tournaments, such as the Torneio Rio–São Paulo. The first explicit national championship was only organised in 1971 by the CBF. A historic characteristic of the league was the lack of standardization in the competition system, which changed almost every season. Because of this, in several seasons there was no promotion and relegation system to the Second Division, and sometimes there were not different tiers. The number of clubs also fluctuated, with the 1979 edition reached its peak, with 92 participants. Since 2006, the format has included 20 clubs and 38 matches, with all teams facing each other in home and away games.

The Campeonato Brasileiro is one of the strongest leagues in the world; it contains the second-most club world champions titles, with 10 championships won among six clubs, and the most Copa Libertadores titles (tied with Argentina’s top division), with 25 titles won among 12 clubs. The IFFHS ranked the league fourth in strength for the 2001–12 period after the Premier League (England), La Liga (Spain), and Serie A (Italy). The Campeonato Brasileiro is the most-watched football league in the Americas and one of the world's most exposed, broadcast in 155 nations. It is also ranked as the sixth most valuable football championship, with a worth of over US$1.43 billion, generating an annual turnover of over US$1.17 billion in 2012.

Since 1959, a total of 156 clubs have played in the Campeonato Brasileiro. Seventeen clubs have been crowned champions, thirteen of which have won the title more than once. Palmeiras is the most successful club, having won the competition twelve times, followed by Santos and Flamengo with eight titles each. Santos' Os Santásticos won five consecutive titles between 1961 and 1965, a feat that hasn't been repeated since.

== History ==
=== Early competitions and attempts to create a national championship (before 1959) ===
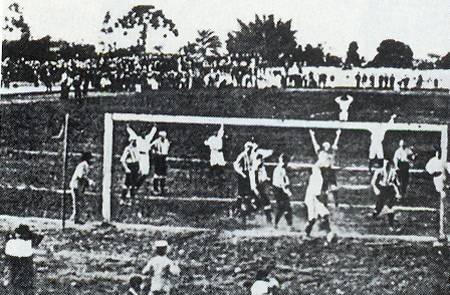
São Paulo Athletic Club and CA Paulistano in the final of the first São Paulo State Championship in 1902

Anglo-Brazilian Charles Miller introduced Brazil to football association rules to Brazil in 1894 upon his return from England, where he attended college and discovered the sport, and it soon became popular in the country. In 1902, Miller helped to organize the Liga Paulista de Foot-Ball, currently the Campeonato Paulista, Brazil's first football league and oldest-running competition in the country. This league only consists of teams based in the state of São Paulo. Due to the size of Brazil, economic and geographical challenges, and lack of transport infrastructure, the creation of a fully national league or championship was almost impossible. Instead, the rest of Brazil followed São Paulo's example and founded state football leagues for each of the Brazilian states and the then Federal District, Rio de Janeiro, whose state championship started in 1906. The state leagues remained the main and most prestigious championships for decades, and were therefore considered the equivalent of national leagues in other countries.

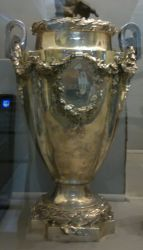
The Taça Brasil trophy.

As the sport grew in popularity, the local state federations and the recently created Confederação Brasileira de Desportos, aka CBD, which became CBF in 1979, started to organize a number of different interstate and regional tournaments. The most popular form of competition in a national level was the Campeonato Brasileiro de Seleções Estaduais (Brazilian Championship of State Teams), a tournament formed by Seleções, teams formed by the best representatives from each state of Brazil (a concept similar to national teams). Originally the nomenclature "Brazilian Championship" belonged to this tournament. While the most prestigious club tournament outside the state championships was the Torneio Rio–São Paulo, organized jointly by the Federação Paulista de Futebol (FPF) and Federação Carioca de Futebol (FCF, current FERJ) and competed between clubs from the Campeonato Paulista and Campeonato Carioca. Since the two championships had the best teams of Brazil at the time, this tournament was considered sometimes a de facto Brazilian championship, for example, in 1951 the Spanish newspaper El Mundo Deportivo called the Rio-São Paulo Tournament the "unofficial Brazilian championship", stating that the two states had the best teams in Brazil.

One of the first experiences of organizing a club championship at national level was the Torneio dos Campeões de 1920, competed between the winners of the Campeonato Paulista (Paulistano), Campeonato Carioca (Fluminense) and Campeonato Gaúcho (Brasil de Pelotas). A second edition was done in the 1937 Torneios dos Campeões, won by Atlético Mineiro. It was the first with fully professional clubs. In August 2023, the Brazilian Football Confederation (CBF) officially recognized the tournament as a Brazilian championship, thus conferring to Atlético Mineiro the status of first national champions of Brazil.

=== Taça Brasil and Torneio Roberto Gomes Pedrosa (1959-1970) ===
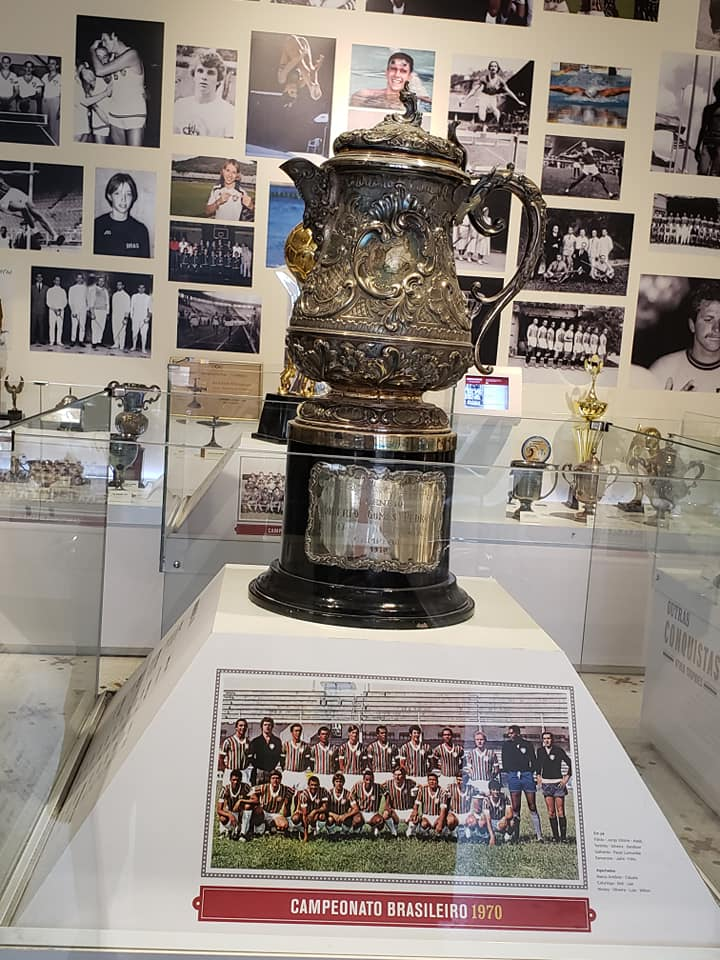
The 1970 Taça de Prata awarded to Fluminense

The Taça Brasil (Brazil Cup) was introduced in 1959, and ran until 1968. The Taça Brasil was created to select a representative for the newly created Copa Libertadores de América, and it was intended to become Brazil's new national competition, replacing the Campeonato Brasileiro de Seleções Estaduais. The Taça Brasil was a pure knockout tournament, with the participants selected from the champions of the state championships. The first champion was Bahia which defeated Pelé's Santos in a remarkable underdog victory, breaking the Rio de Janeiro-São Paulo hegemony in national football.

In 1967, the Federação Paulista de Futebol and Federação Carioca de Futebol decided to expand the Torneio Rio–São Paulo to include teams from other states of Brazil. Thus becoming the Torneio Roberto Gomes Pedrosa, nicknamed the Robertão by fans and media. Differently from the Taça Brasil, the Robertão was competed with a round-robin system, with two groups in the first stage, and a quadrangular with the two best teams of each group on the final stage. It was competed between 1967 and 1970.

In 1968, the delay in closing the 1968 Taça Brasil made CBD use the Robertão to determine the Libertadores representatives. The Confederation took over the organization of the Robertão, officially renaming it to the "Taça de Prata" (Silver Cup), and extinguished the Taça Brasil after the end of that year's edition. The Robertão remained the top Brazilian championship the following two years.

Because the Robertão and the Taça Brasil ran at the same time for two years (1967 and 1968), the 1968 season has two separate simultaneous Brazilian champions: the 1968 Taça Brasil was won by Botafogo and the 1968 Torneio Roberto Gomes Pedrosa was won by Santos. In contrast, the 1967 season saw Palmeiras champion of both competitions.

Both the Taça Brasil and the Torneio Roberto Gomes Pedrosa were recognized as Brazilian national championships retroactively on 22 December 2010, creating some controversy as there was a two-year period when both tournaments were held, thus Palmeiras had both 1967 titles recognized as separate editions of the Brazilian championship, and both Santos and Botafogo were recognized as champions in 1968 as each tournament was won by one of them.

The titles of old tournaments, cited in the Brazilian championship history, are equated to the title of Série A, but the tournaments are catalogued with their original name in the statistics (despite being different competitions, they confer the same title).

=== Campeonato Nacional de Clubes and Copa Brasil (1971-1979) ===
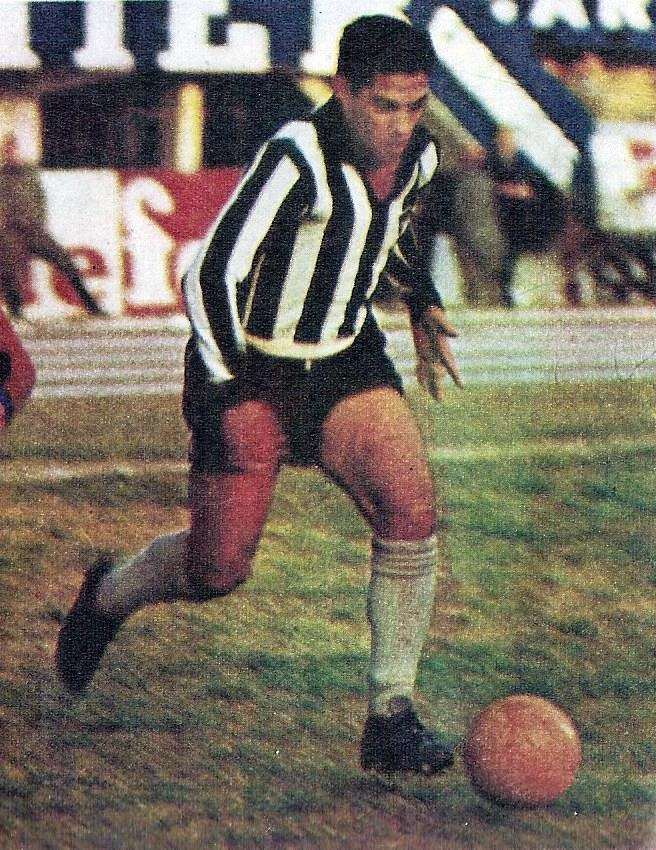
Garrincha playing for Botafogo in the 1960s

Following Brazil's third world title at the 1970 FIFA World Cup, president Emílio Médici decided to better organize Brazilian football. The Brazilian military government had become heavily involved in football as a way to promote the legitimization of the military regime, national unity and patriotism, as well as part of the Programa de Integração Nacional, which sought the geographical integration of Brazil. In a meeting with the CBD and the club presidents in October 1970, it was decided to create the following year a Brazilian championship contested by twenty teams, inspired by the national tournaments in the European nations. The first edition was named "Campeonato Nacional de Clubes" ("National Championship of Clubs"), was held in 1971 and won by Atlético Mineiro. The top division was named "Divisão Extra" (Extra Division), while a newly created second division earned the "Primeira Divisão" (First Division) name. The second division was a fusion of the already existing Torneio Centro-Sul and the Copa Norte-Nordeste, with teams from regions with less expression in national football and weaker teams from the main footballing states of Brazil. The first champion was Villa Nova Atlético Clube, from the town of Nova Lima, Minas Gerais. There was not, however, a system of promotion and relegation. The clubs were instead selected to participate in either division according to their performances at their respective state championships.

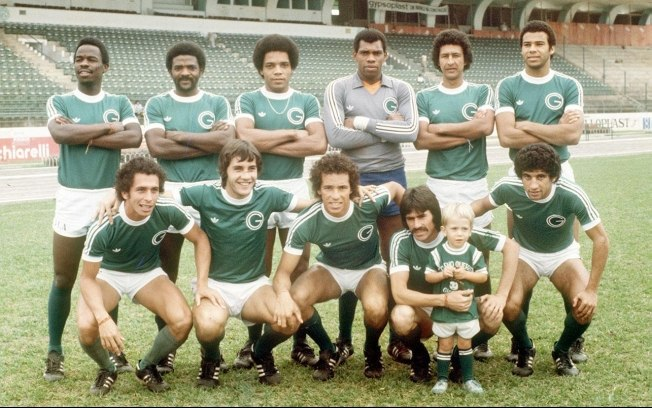
Group photo of the 1978 Guarani squad, from the city of Campinas, winners of the 1978 Campeonato Nacional de Clubes. Together with Santos, they are the only teams not belonging to a state capital to become national champions.

In the next few years, due to the influence of the military regime, the number of clubs that participated in the competition steadily increased. Each subsequent edition added teams to garner support to the military government, specially from regions were ruling party ARENA had less support. This was epitomized by a common aphorism at the time: "Onde a ARENA vai mal, mais um time no Nacional" ("Where ARENA is doing badly, another team in the National [championship]"). The inaugural edition had 20 teams, the second edition in 1972 expanded to 26 clubs, and the 1973 edition saw the second division dissolved and its clubs were now participating in an unified national championship with 40 clubs. From 1975 onwards, the competition was officially named Copa Brasil (Brazil Cup). By the 1979 edition, won by Internacional (so far the only team to win the Brazilian championship undefeated) the number of clubs participating peaked, with a total of 92 teams.

=== Creation of the CBF, new reformulations and crises (1980-1987) ===
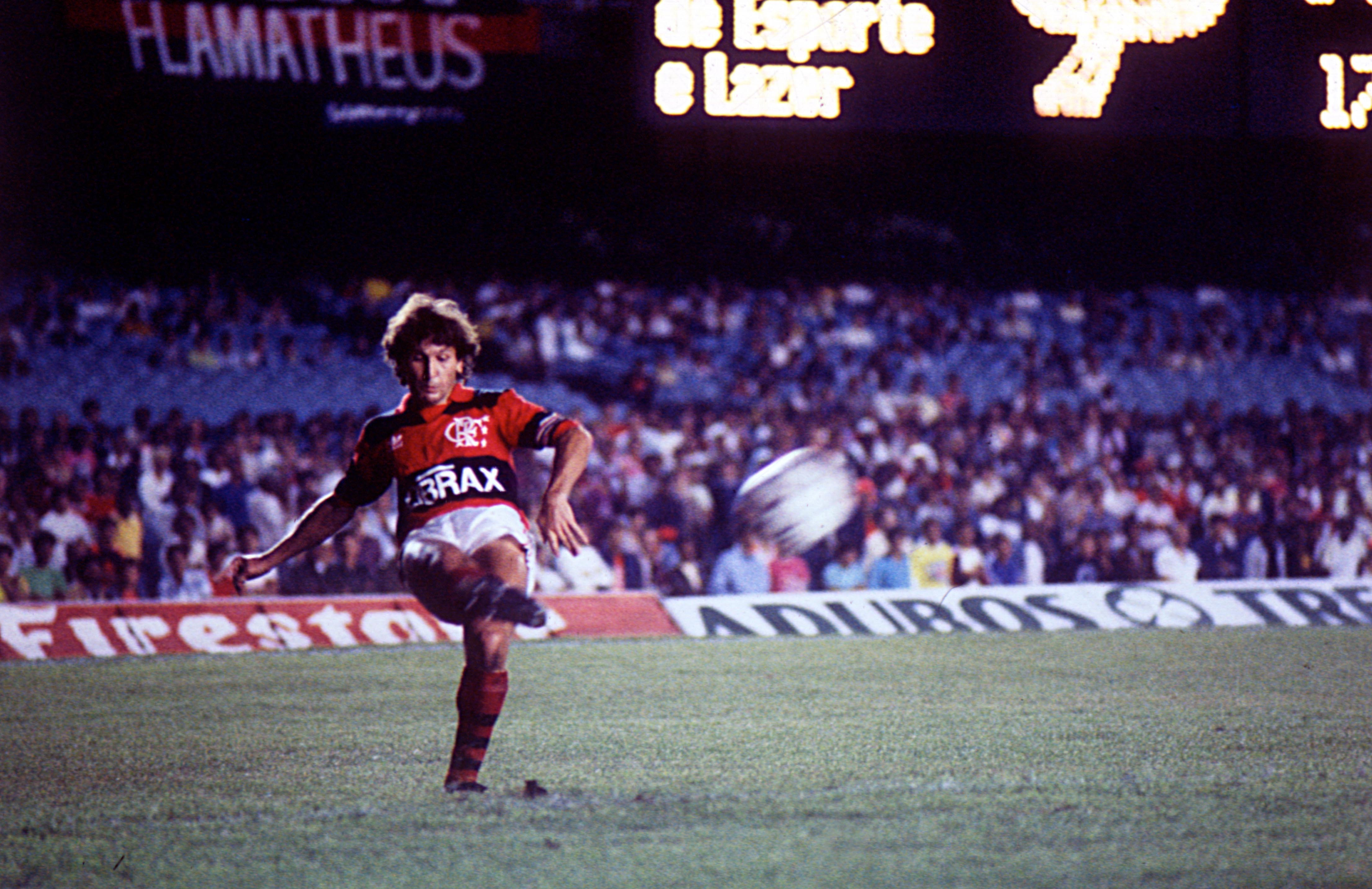
Zico playing for Flamengo at the 1981 Taça de Ouro

On 24 September 1979, the CBD was replaced by the Brazilian Football Confederation (CBF). This coincided with the 1980s financial crisis in Brazil, which together with the previous decade's oil crisis and the gradual end of the military dictatorship, led to major reorganization of Brazilian football. The Championship was downsized and a new format was introduced. The 1980 edition was named "Taça de Ouro" (Gold Cup). The second division was also reintroduced, now with the name "Taça de Prata" (Silver Cup). A mechanism of promotion also first appeared in this edition: the four best-ranked teams in the first phase of the "Taça Prata" would go on to compete in the second phase of the "Taça Ouro". The Taça de Bronze (Bronze Cup) was also created as a third division in 1981, with the inaugural champion being Olaria Atlético Clube, a club from the neighbourhood of Olaria in the city of Rio de Janeiro. But citing financial issues, the CBF announced, shortly after the end of the first edition, that the tournament would be discontinued. The third division would later return in one-off editions in 1988, 1990, 1992 until it became regularly competed from 1994 onwards.

In 1987, CBF announced it was not financially able to organize the Brazilian football championship, a mere few weeks before it was scheduled to begin. As a result, the thirteen most popular football clubs in Brazil created an association, called Clube dos 13, to organize a championship of their own. This tournament was called Copa União and was run by the 16 clubs that eventually took part in it (Santa Cruz, Coritiba and Goiás were invited to join). CBF initially stood by the Club of the 13 decision. However, weeks later, with the competition already underway, and under pressure from football clubs excluded from the Copa União, CBF adopted a new set of rules, which considered the Copa União part of a larger tournament, comprising another 16 teams. According to that new set of rules, the Copa União would be dubbed the Green Module of the CBF championship, whereas the other 16 teams would play the Yellow Module. In the end, the first two teams of each Module would play each other to define the national champions and the two teams that would represent Brazil in the Copa Libertadores in 1988. However, that new set of rules was never recognized by the Club of the 13 and largely ignored by most of the Brazilian media, who concentrated their attention in the independent league, which was eventually won by Flamengo. The eventual final tourney was set to have Sport and Guarani, from the yellow module, and Flamengo and Internacional from the green one. It never materialized, however, as Flamengo and Internacional refused to partake in it. As a result, Sport and Guarani played each other, with the first one winning the Championship for 1987 and both going on to represent Brazil in the 1988 Copa Libertadores. Although Flamengo has attempted to gain recognition of its title of the Green Module as a Brazilian championship title multiple times through the justice system, Sport remains recognized by both CBF and FIFA as 1987 champions. Some football fans in Brazil still consider Flamengo as the Brazilian Champion of 1987, or at least co-champions.

=== Changes to CBF and transitional period (1988-2000) ===
After the chaos caused by the 1987 edition, the CBF and Club of the 13 reached an agreement on how to organize the next year's edition of the Copa União. The 1988 Campeonato Brasileiro reduced the number of participants, to hold a more competitive championship with just 24 teams. Furthermore, for the first time, the competition had a true promotion and relegation system, as required by FIFA. The last four placed in the first division (Bangu, Santa Cruz, Criciúma and America) were relegated to the second division in 1989, being replaced by Inter de Limeira and Náutico, respectively champion and runner-up of the 1988 Special Division. The 1989 edition was the first to use the terminology "Série A", inspired by the Italian league system.

On 16 January 1989, Ricardo Teixeira took over the presidency of the CBF. He came to command the Confederation at a time when it was facing serious financial problems. Teixeira managed to turn it into a profitable operation through millionaire contracts involving the Brazilian national team. During his management, the Brazilian Championship became more reorganized and the revenue generated by the clubs was increased, both in television quotas and sponsorships. However, since the first decade of his administration, Ricardo Teixeira has been involved in several allegations of corruption.

The Brazilian Championship had already been tested with countless different formulas and names, being quite bloated and confusing in several editions. However, from 1987 onwards, with the creation of the Copa União, there was a decrease in the number of participants in the championship. As a result, several clubs from less popular regions that entered the national competition because they were state champions no longer faced clubs considered "big" and traditional, and as a result, some associations were even at risk of becoming extinct. To calm the discontent of these clubs and smaller federations, the CBF was forced to create a national "cup" along the lines of the European ones. In 1989, the entity created a secondary national competition, the Copa do Brasil, which allowed clubs from all states to enter. The first champion of the Copa do Brasil was Grêmio. With the creation of this new tournament, the CBF decided, for the first time, to officially name the country's main national football tournament the "Campeonato Brasileiro", to make it clear which was the national tournament in Brazil that would give its winner the title of Brazilian champion and, also, to avoid confusion between "Copa do Brasil" and "Copa Brasil", one of the old names used by the Brasileirão between 1975 and 1980.

In the 1999 edition, a new relegation system was adopted, similar to that used in the Argentine football league. The two clubs with the worst average campaigns in the first phase and in the previous season were relegated. However, this system only lasted a single season. During the first phase of the competition, it was discovered that the player Sandro Hiroshi of São Paulo was registered irregularly. Botafogo, at the risk of being relegated to Série B, requested a 6-1 loss to São Paulo to be annulled. Later Internacional also successfully appealed to have a match result voided (a 2-2 draw) on the same grounds. The Supreme Court of Sporting Justice (STJD) ruled in favor of Internacional and Botafogo, and they both gained the points from the match. This meant that Botafogo was spared from relegation, and the change led SE Gama, from the Federal District, to be relegated instead. Seeing the situation, Gama, along with the Distrito Federal Football Coaches Union and political party PFL immediately sued the CBF to return Gama to the Série A. The ordinary courts decided in favor of Gama, going against the STJD's decision. By June 2000, the trial had not been solved, and therefore the CBF could not organize the 2000 edition of the Brasileirão.

Without the CBF, the Clube dos 13 decided to organize the Brazilian championship for the year 2000, and this edition became known as the Copa João Havelange. To avoid further legal problems, the championship would encompass all divisions. This edition became controversial for its organization: 116 clubs from all the three divisions, divided in four "modules" organized as the championships before the Sandro Hiroshi case. The Blue Module, equivalent to the Série A, Yellow Module, equivalent to the Série B with some Série C clubs, and the Green and White Modules from Série C clubs, the former from the North, Northeast and Central-West regions of Brazil and the latter from South and Southeast of Brazil. Although equivalents to different tiers, the best placed teams from the all modules would qualify for the play-offs. Another controversy was the choice of clubs for the Blue Module: Fluminense, which had played in 1999 Campeonato Brasileiro Série C and obtained promotion to Série B, was included in the Blue Module of the new competition, where the elite of Brazilian football was, without having to go through the second division. Similarly, Bahia, who was playing at the 1999 Campeonato Brasileiro Série B and failed to get promoted back to the top division, was included in the Blue Module. The Copa João Havelange was won by Vasco da Gama.

=== Modern championship: round-robin format, stabilization and growth (2001-present) ===
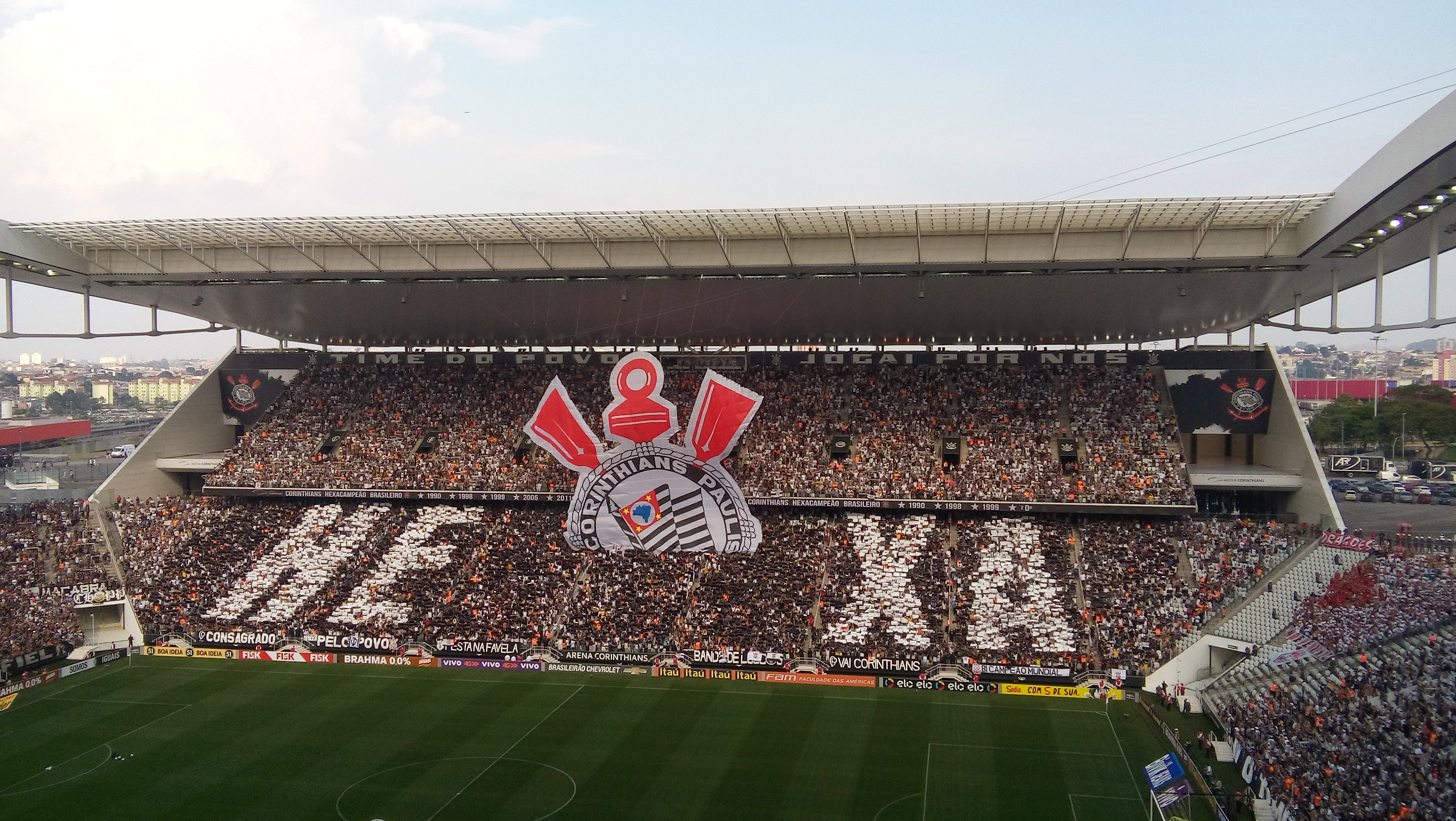
Tifo organized by Corinthians supporters to celebrate its 6th title after winning the 2015 Campeonato Brasileiro Série A

One of the historical characteristics of the Brazilian Championship was the lack of standardization and constant change in the competition system, as well as the rules and the number of participants. Changes to the format started being discussed in favor of a regular and stable form of competition ever since Ricardo Teixeira's election in 1989, but the chaos of the 2000 edition made it even more apparent that change was necessary. In 2002, the Clube dos 13 voted in favor of adopting a European-style round-robin format: The teams play each other once at home and once away, and the team that scores the most points is declared champion. The tiebreaker criteria vary, from number of wins to goal difference. Rede Globo, the Brasileirão's main broadcasting partner was against the removal of playoffs, arguing the new format would lead to a loss of revenue and audience without decisive games. The last edition of the old format was won by Santos.

In the 2003 tournament, the first one with the round-robin system, 24 clubs competed and it had 46 matchdays. This edition was won by Cruzeiro, who also won Brazil's first domestic treble (State championship, Copa do Brasil, and Campeonato Brasileiro) that year. In Cruzeiro's case, that meant the Série A, Copa do Brasil and Campeonato Mineiro, and this feat would later be repeated by arch-rivals Atlético Mineiro in 2021. The league was also played with 24 teams and 46 matches in 2004, an edition won by Santos.

In the 2005 edition, the number of teams was reduced to 22 and the number of matchdays reduced to 42. This edition, won by Corinthians, was also notable for a match fixing scandal, resulting in the voiding and replaying of 11 matches.

For the 2006 tournament, the number of teams fell to 20 and the number of matches per team also fell to 38. That tournament was won by São Paulo. The CBF itself said this format would be a "definitive format", with the four best teams qualifying for the Copa Libertadores (which was later increased by CONMEBOL), and the four worst teams being relegated to Série B with the season being between May and December. This was the last change to the competition's format, which has remained stable ever since. Also, in that year, the Série B adopted the same format, with 20 teams and 38 matches, with the top 4 being promoted to Série A, and the bottom 4 being relegated to Série C.

In 2008, the CBF announced the creation the Série D as a fourth division. In 2009, the number of clubs in the Série C was downsized from 63 to 20 teams. The 2009 Campeonato Brasileiro Série D had 39 teams and its first champion was São Raimundo from Santarém, Pará. Currently the Série D has 64 teams and serves as the lowest national tier.

Since 2003, when the league adopted the double round-robin system, 45 teams have participated in at least one edition of the Brasileirão as a double round-robin tournament and 9 teams have won it: Corinthians, Palmeiras and Flamengo (4 times each); Cruzeiro and São Paulo (3 times each); Fluminense (2 times); Santos, Atlético Mineiro and Botafogo (1 time each). Only Cruzeiro in 2003 and Atlético Mineiro in 2021 were able to win the Brasileirão and the Copa do Brasil in the same season. Similarly, only Santos in 1962 and 1963, Flamengo in 2019 and 2025 and Botafogo in 2024 were able to win the Brasileirão and the Copa Libertadores in the same season. No team has ever achieved a continental treble of Campeonato Brasileiro, Copa do Brasil and Copa Libertadores since the Copa do Brasil was created in 1989.

== Competition format ==
=== Competition ===
There are 20 clubs in the Brasileirão. During the course of a season (from March to December) each club plays the others twice (a double round-robin system), once at their home stadium and once at that of their opponents, for a total of 38 games. Teams receive three points for a win and one point for a draw. No points are awarded for a loss. Teams are ranked by total points, wins, goal difference, and goals scored. At the end of each season, the club with the most points is crowned champions. A system of promotion and relegation exists between the Brasileirão and the Série B. The four lowest placed teams in the Brasileirão are relegated to Série B, and the top four teams from the Série B are promoted to the Brasileirão.

If there's a tie in points between two or more clubs, the rules are:

1. Most wins
2. Goal difference
3. Goals scored
4. Head to head results
5. Least red cards received
6. Least yellow cards received
7. Drawing of lots

If the tie is between three or more teams, head to head results are not considered.

=== Qualification for international competitions ===
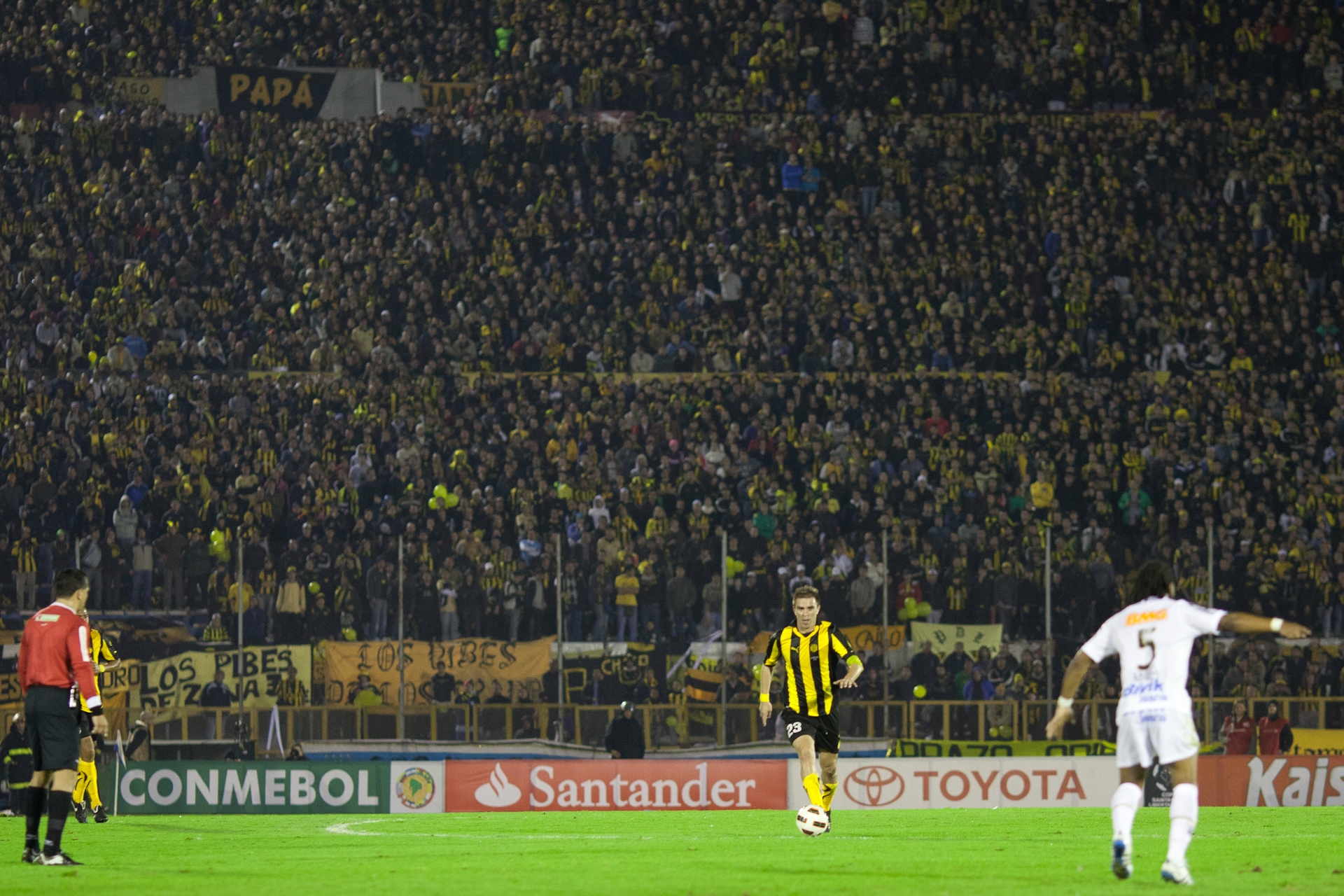
Peñarol vs Santos in the Centenario Stadium of Montevideo during the 2011 Copa Libertadores Finals.

Since 2016, the top six clubs in the Brasileirão qualify for the following Copa Libertadores. The top four clubs directly enter the group stage whilst the fifth and sixth-placed clubs enter in the second round. The number of teams qualifying for the Libertadores may increase depending on who wins the Copa do Brasil, Copa Sudamericana or Copa Libertadores.

Clubs from seventh to twelfth place qualify for the following Copa Sudamericana, although as above the numbers can depend on other competitions.

== Current teams ==
Twenty teams compete in the championship this season, including the sixteen best teams from the previous season and the four promoted from the Campeonato Brasileiro Série B.

Location of teams in 2026 Série A

Team	Location	State	Stadium	Turf	Capacity
Athletico Paranaense	Curitiba	Paraná	Arena da Baixada	Artificial	42,372
Atlético Mineiro	Belo Horizonte	Minas Gerais	Arena MRV	Artificial	44,892
Bahia	Salvador	Bahia	Casa de Apostas Arena Fonte Nova	Natural	49,000
Botafogo	Rio de Janeiro	Rio de Janeiro	Olímpico Nilton Santos	Artificial	44,661
Chapecoense	Chapecó	Santa Catarina	Arena Condá	Artificial	20,089
Corinthians	São Paulo	São Paulo	Neo Química Arena	Hybrid	47,252
Coritiba	Curitiba	Paraná	Couto Pereira	Natural	40,502
Cruzeiro	Belo Horizonte	Minas Gerais	Mineirão	Natural	66,658
Flamengo	Rio de Janeiro	Rio de Janeiro	Maracanã	Hybrid	78,838
Fluminense	Rio de Janeiro	Rio de Janeiro	Maracanã	Hybrid	78,838
Grêmio	Porto Alegre	Rio Grande do Sul	Arena do Grêmio	Hybrid	60,540
Internacional	Porto Alegre	Rio Grande do Sul	Beira-Rio	Natural	49,055
Mirassol	Mirassol	São Paulo	Campos Maia	Natural	14,534
Palmeiras	São Paulo	São Paulo	Allianz Parque	Artificial	43,713
Red Bull Bragantino	Bragança Paulista	São Paulo	Cícero de Souza Marques	Natural	12,000
Remo	Belém	Pará	Baenão	Natural	13,792
Remo	Belém	Pará	Mangueirão	Natural	53,645
Santos	Santos	São Paulo	Vila Belmiro	Natural	16,068
São Paulo	São Paulo	São Paulo	MorumBIS	Natural	66,671
Vasco da Gama	Rio de Janeiro	Rio de Janeiro	São Januário	Natural	24,584
Vitória	Salvador	Bahia	Barradão	Natural	30,793

== Champions ==
Seventeen clubs are officially recognized to have been the Brazilian football champions. The teams who are competing in the 2026 season are marked in bold. And the teams who have never been relegated to any lower division are marked in italic.

Rank	Club	Titles	Runner-up	Years won	Years runner-up
1	(São Paulo (state)) **Palmeiras**	12	7	1960, 1967 (TB), 1967 (RGP), 1969, 1972, 1973, 1993, 1994, 2016, 2018, 2022, 2023	1970, 1978, 1997, 2017, 2024, 2025, 2026
2	(Rio de Janeiro (state)) **Flamengo**	9	3	1980, 1982, 1983, 1992, 2009, 2019, 2020, 2025, 2026	1964, 2018, 2021
3	(São Paulo (state)) **Santos**	8	8	1961, 1962, 1963, 1964, 1965, 1968 (RGP), 2002, 2004	1959, 1966, 1983, 1995, 2003, 2007, 2016, 2019
4	(São Paulo (state)) **Corinthians**	7	3	1990, 1998, 1999, 2005, 2011, 2015, 2017	1976, 1994, 2002
5	(São Paulo (state)) **São Paulo**	6	6	1977, 1986, 1991, 2006, 2007, 2008	1971, 1973, 1981, 1989, 1990, 2014
6	(Minas Gerais) **Cruzeiro**	4	5	1966, 2003, 2013, 2014	1969, 1974, 1975, 1998, 2010
6	(Rio de Janeiro (state)) **Vasco da Gama**	4	4	1974, 1989, 1997, 2000	1965, 1979, 1984, 2011
6	(Rio de Janeiro (state)) **Fluminense**	4	1	1970, 1984, 2010, 2012	1937
9	(Rio Grande do Sul) **Internacional**	3	8	1975, 1976, 1979	1967 (RGP), 1968 (RGP), 1988, 2005, 2006, 2009, 2020, 2022
9	(Minas Gerais) **Atlético Mineiro**	3	5	1937, 1971, 2021	1977, 1980, 1999, 2012, 2015
9	(Rio de Janeiro (state)) **Botafogo**	3	3	1968 (TB), 1995, 2024	1962, 1972, 1992
12	(Rio Grande do Sul) **Grêmio**	2	4	1981, 1996	1982, 2008, 2013, 2023
12	**Bahia**	2	2	1959, 1988	1961, 1963
14	(São Paulo (state)) Guarani	1	2	1978	1986, 1987
14	(Paraná (state)) **Athletico Paranaense**	1	1	2001	2004
14	(Paraná (state)) **Coritiba**	1	0	1985	—
14	(Pernambuco) Sport Recife	1	0	1987	—
—	(Ceará) **Fortaleza**	0	2	—	1960, 1968 (TB)
—	(São Paulo (state)) São Caetano	0	2	—	2000, 2001
—	(Pernambuco) Náutico	0	1	—	1967 (TB)
—	(Rio de Janeiro (state)) Bangu	0	1	—	1985
—	(São Paulo (state)) **RB Bragantino**	0	1	—	1991
—	(Bahia) **Vitória**	0	1	—	1993
—	(São Paulo (state)) Portuguesa	0	1	—	1996

Note: Although some consider Flamengo's title of the Green Module of the 1987 Copa União as a Brazilian championship title, Sport is officially the only champion of this competition.

== Nomenclature and sponsorship ==
The Campeonato Brasileiro had its official name changed often before settling on Campeonato Brasileiro in 1989.

Identity	English name	Years	Official Sponsor
Copa dos Campeões Estaduais	State Champions Cup	1937	None
Taça Brasil	Brazil Cup	1959–1968	None
Torneio Roberto Gomes Pedrosa	Roberto Gomes Pedrosa Tournament	1967–1970	None
Campeonato Nacional	National Championship	1971–1974	None
Copa Brasil	Brazil Cup	1975–1979, 1984, 1986	None
Taça de Ouro	Golden Cup	1980–1983, 1985	None
Copa Brasil	Brazil Cup (Note: The official name was Copa Brasil (Brazil Cup), but it became known as Copa União (Union Cup).)	1987–88	None
Copa João Havelange	João Havelange Cup	2000	None
Campeonato Brasileiro	Brazilian Championship	1989–1999, 2001–	2001: LATAM (Brasileirão TAM); 2002: Visa (Troféu VISA Electron); 2005: Nestlé (Taça Nestlé Brasileirão); 2009–2012: Petrobras (Brasileirão Petrobras); 2014–2017: Chevrolet (Brasileirão Chevrolet); 2018–2023: Assaí Atacadista (Brasileirão Assaí); 2024–2026: Betano (Brasileirão Betano)

== Finances ==
The Brasileirão had total club revenues of US$1.17 billion in 2012. This makes the Brasileirão the highest revenue football league in the Americas, and the highest outside of Europe's "big five."

The Brasileirão is also one of the world's most valuable football leagues, having a marketing value and worth over US$1.24 billion in 2013. The total worth of every club in the 2013 Brasileirão is US$1.07 billion.

The Brasileirão's television rights were worth over US$610 million in 2012; that accounts for over 57% of Latin America as a whole.

In 2013 Corinthians was the 16th most valuable club in the world, worth over US$358 million. As of 2021, no Brazilian club enters the list of the most valuable football clubs.

== All-time table ==
The All-time Campeonato Brasileiro table is an overall record of all match results, points, and goals of every team that has played in the Brazilian League. The table is accurate as of the end of the 2024 season, and includes the recently recognized 1937 Copa dos Campeões Estaduais, and all editions since 1959. Teams in bold will take part in the top division in 2025.

Team		Pts	GP	W	D	L	GF	GA	GD
1	**São Paulo**	2427	1652	720	486	446	2376	1710	+666
2	**Internacional**	2373	1633	713	459	461	2209	1669	+540
3	**Palmeiras**	2367	1579	730	431	418	2346	1673	+673
4	**Flamengo**	2351	1660	708	461	491	2328	1874	+454
5	**Atlético Mineiro**	2342	1654	708	457	489	2394	1927	+467
6	**Corinthians**	2323	1635	693	482	460	2139	1704	+435
7	**Santos**	2278	1630	681	461	488	2368	1850	+518
8	**Grêmio**	2268	1627	691	442	494	2178	1747	+431
9	**Cruzeiro**	2185	1557	661	427	469	2209	1751	+458
10	**Fluminense**	2097	1593	621	432	540	2110	1905	+205
11	**Vasco da Gama**	1902	1485	557	444	484	2010	1819	+191
12	**Botafogo**	1898	1500	554	428	518	1901	1813	+88
13	Athletico Paranaense	1757	1329	499	350	480	1716	1624	+92
14	Goiás	1428	1169	401	325	443	1477	1523	-46
15	**Bahia**	1390	1206	401	367	438	1367	1472	-105
16	Coritiba	1351	1145	396	303	446	1329	1413	-84
17	**Sport Recife**	1161	1010	335	277	398	1133	1252	-119
18	**Vitória**	1154	1010	332	267	411	1210	1412	-202
19	Portuguesa	900	787	260	249	278	961	973	-12
20	Guarani	889	709	269	215	225	898	797	+101

Campeonato Brasileiro table from 1971 to 1979
Pos	Team	GP	W	D	L	Pts
1	Internacional	122	66	38	18	188
2	Grêmio	122	63	38	21	176
3	Palmeiras	120	61	41	18	174
4	Corinthians	121	58	46	17	173
5	Cruzeiro	121	56	47	18	171
6	Atlético Mineiro	121	58	36	27	168
7	Flamengo	122	59	32	31	164
8	São Paulo	121	54	43	24	163
9	Vasco da Gama	121	41	27	58	150
10	Botafogo	120	44	49	27	147

Campeonato Brasileiro table from 1980 to 1989
Pos	Team	GP	W	D	L	Pts
1	Flamengo	228	112	70	46	308
2	Vasco da Gama	214	101	64	49	287
3	Atlético Mineiro	209	100	67	42	281
4	São Paulo	206	98	65	43	274
5	Grêmio	216	95	65	56	267
6	Fluminense	203	203	87	61	248
7	Santos	201	82	67	52	241
8	Internacional	199	77	65	57	237
9	Corinthians	201	79	65	57	234
10	Cruzeiro	179	67	62	50	205

Campeonato Brasileiro table from 1990 to 1999
Pos	Team	GP	W	D	L	Pts
1	Palmeiras	235	123	59	53	368
2	Corinthians	235	106	65	64	329
3	Santos	235	99	67	69	320
4	São Paulo	235	98	64	73	305
5	Atlético Mineiro	224	90	63	71	300
6	Vasco da Gama	225	86	70	69	297
7	Cruzeiro	218	86	57	75	282
8	Flamengo	231	85	64	82	280
9	Botafogo	225	87	58	80	276
10	Internacional	217	80	62	75	274

Campeonato Brasileiro table from 2000 to 2009
Pos	Team	GP	W	D	L	Pts
1	São Paulo	365	185	95	85	650
2	Santos	368	162	92	114	578
3	Cruzeiro	362	167	73	122	574
4	Internacional	362	161	81	120	564
5	Athletico Paranaense	366	151	85	130	538
6	Fluminense	368	140	104	124	524
7	Flamengo	362	139	94	129	511
8	Palmeiras	316	134	78	104	480
9	Grêmio	325	132	77	116	473
10	Corinthians	330	126	85	119	463

Campeonato Brasileiro table from 2010 to 2019
Pos	Team	GP	W	D	L	Pts
1	Corinthians	380	170	113	97	623
2	Grêmio	380	174	100	106	622
3	Flamengo	380	161	111	108	594
4	São Paulo	380	163	101	116	590
5	Santos	380	163	99	118	588
6	Atlético Mineiro	380	160	93	127	573
7	Cruzeiro	380	158	98	124	572
8	Fluminense	380	153	94	133	553
9	Palmeiras	342	145	89	108	524
10	Internacional	342	140	96	106	516

== Media coverage ==
=== Brazil ===
Value of television rights
Season(s)	Price	TV
1987–89	$3.4 million	Globo
1990–94	not available	Globo
1994–96	$31.4 million	Globo
1997–2003	$50 million	Globo
2003–05	$390 million	Globo
2005–08	$900 million	Globo
2009–11	R$1.9 billion	Globo
2012–15	R$2.96 billion	Globo
2016–19	R$4.11 billion	Globo

In 1997, live broadcasts of matches began to be restricted in cities where the matches were held (except finals). The Clube dos 13 closed the contract with Rede Globo's television rights as the holder of the Brasileirão for $50 million (including editions of 1998 and 1999), and resolves itself split the rights with Rede Bandeirantes during this period. It was the first edition to be shown on pay-per-view (via Premiere). In addition, the first games shown on pay television were courtesy of SporTV, after a controversial signing contract of Clube dos 13 with Globosat. Previously, in 1993, the Club of the 13 an CBF had signed a contract with TVA, a company in which ESPN was part of. However, that decision was declined.

In 2000, the broadcasting rights of the Copa João Havelange, organized by the Clube dos 13, were sold to Rede Globo for $50 million. However, the final of this competition in 2001, was marked by an unusual situation. Vasco da Gama, a finalist against São Caetano, graced the logo of SBT, the second largest television station of Brazil, a direct rival to Globo. This situation was somewhat embarrassing for Globo, which transmitted the final exclusively, and which was seen by an estimated audience of 60 million people. Despite the large number of spectators in the final match, this edition was marked by low ratings, what did the Rede Globo to cancel the broadcast of a few matches.

In 2001, Clube dos 13 defines four divisions of transmission quota, with Corinthians, São Paulo, Palmeiras, Flamengo and Vasco in group 1, Santos in group 2, Fluminense, Botafogo, Atlético Mineiro, Cruzeiro, Internacional and Grêmio in group 3, and Bahia, Goiás, Sport Recife, Portuguesa, Coritiba, Athletico Paranaense, and Vitória in group 4. In 2003, the value was expanded by a considerable amount, for the first time surpassing the three digits, after the adoption of the new format of accrued points. The contract of $130 million per year was signed again by TV Globo. In 2005, C13 renews with Globo for the 2006–09 period in a deal worth $300 million.

In 2009, for the first time, the sale of broadcasting rights of the Brazilian Championship were made via open bidding. Media organisations were invited to bid for TV packages open, closed, PPV, internet and broadcast abroad. Rede Globo subsequently won the largest TV contract in the history of Brazilian football; $1.4 billion for 2009–2011.

In the early part of 2011, the majority of Clube dos 13 indicated they would be negotiating the 2012–2014 league rights independently.

In 2012, the final league rights amounts are uncertain. However, it is known that the clubs were divided into four groups: Group 1: Flamengo and Corinthians receiving 84 to 120 million reals; Group 2: São Paulo, Palmeiras, Santos and Vasco receiving 70 to 80 million reais; Group 3: Gremio, Cruzeiro, Atlético Mineiro VAR, Fluminense and Botafogo (45 to 55 million reais); Group 4: other first division clubs (18 to 30 million reais).

In 2013, SporTV made a deal with Fox Sports, giving up the rights of Campeonato Brasileiro in exchange for live coverage of the Copa Libertadores.

In 2016, Bandeirantes ended the partnership with Globo and ceased showing league matches, leaving Globo with exclusive rights. However, the channel of Turner Group, Esporte Interativo made a deal with Atlético-PR, Bahia, Ceará, Coritiba, Internacional, Joinville, Paysandu, Sampaio Corrêa, Santos, Criciúma, Fortaleza, Paraná, Ponte Preta and Santa Cruz for the broadcasting rights on cable television between 2019 and 2024, opposing Globo's SporTV channel. A decision on whether Palmeiras will be joining these teams is awaited.

In February 2021 the streaming service Paramount+ announced it will broadcast 350 matches

Flamengo and Corinthians, the two most supported teams in Brazil, receive approximately 25% (1/4) of all revenue from television. Flamengo has the biggest budget, (R$115.1 million), and Figueirense the smallest (R$18.5 million).

=== outside Brazil ===
Region	Broadcaster
International	Fanatiz
International	Flamengo TV
Africa	Sporty TV
Africa	StarTimes Sports
Africa	ZAP
Austria	Sportdigital
Germany	Sportdigital
Switzerland	Sportdigital
Bosnia and Herzegovina	Arena Sport
Montenegro	Arena Sport
North Macedonia	Arena Sport
Serbia	Arena Sport
Ecuador	ECDF
Ireland	Premier Sports
United Kingdom	Premier Sports
Israel	Charlton
MENA	Dubai Sports
Mexico	TV Azteca
Peru	L1Max
Portugal	Canal 11
Spain	Movistar Plus+
Turkey	D-Smart

== Match ball ==
Since 1999, the Brazilian league's official ball has been manufactured by Nike. Before this exclusive supply of balls, some brands like Umbro and Topper had supplied balls for the championship. The most recent ball is called CBF Nike Brasil Flight 2025, being based on Nike's Flight model.

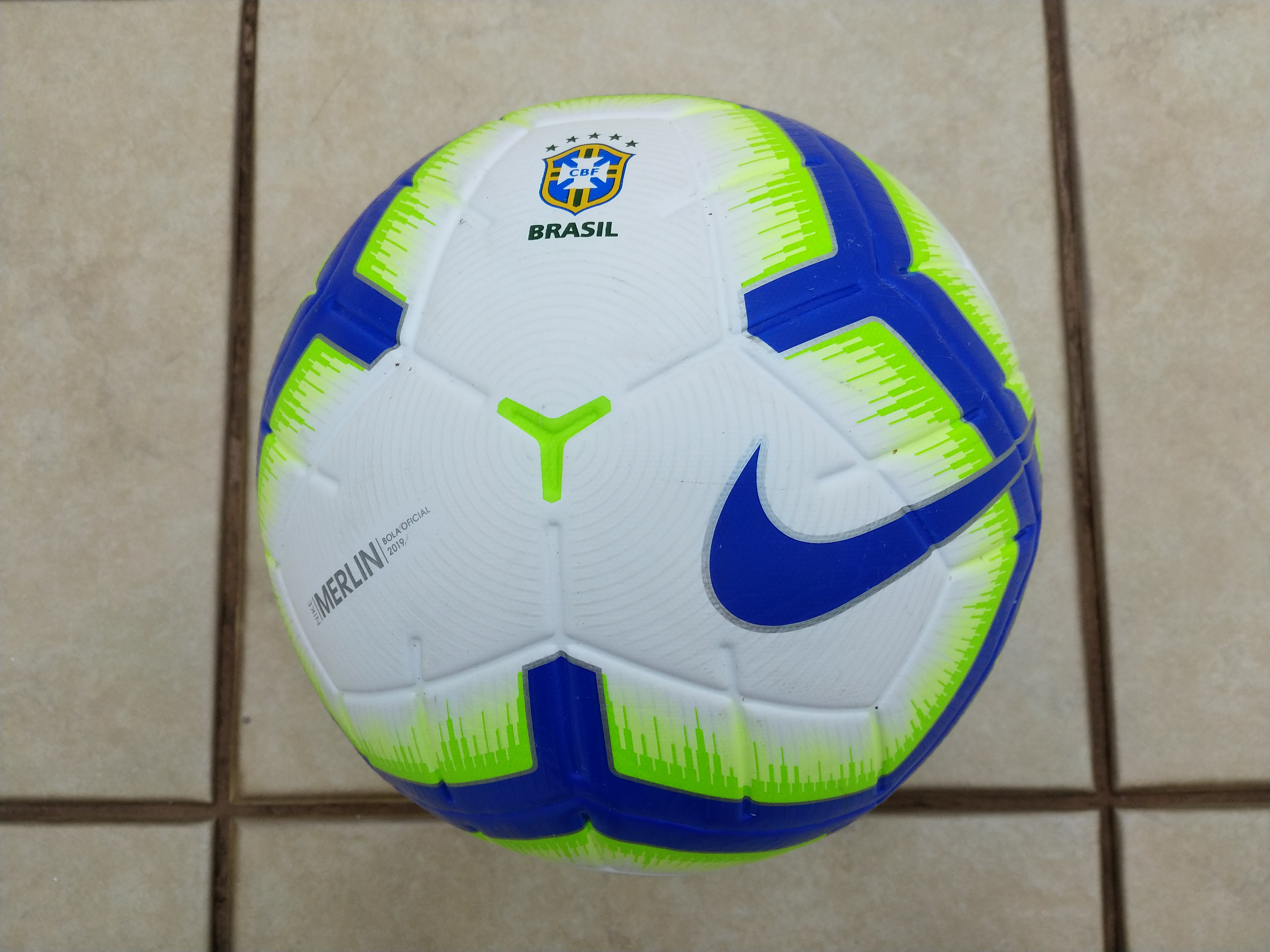
2019 Nike Merlin CBF

== Attendance ==
The audience of the Campeonato Brasileiro Série A is low if put into consideration the popularity of football in the country. Since the first data record, in 1967, each year the average attendance has fluctuated, having the season of 2023 as the largest, averaging 26,502, and 2004 as the smallest, with a very low average of 7,556.

In comparison to other football leagues attendance figures, the Campeonato Brasileiro Série A ranked in at seventh place worldwide in 2023. The smallest attendance ever was a game between Juventude and Portuguesa in 1997 with 55 fans, the largest was Flamengo and Santos in 1983 with 155,523.

The attendance of 2014 season was 16,337 with average occupation of 40%. In this same year, the average price of the ticket was $12.82, taking the games with an average income of $204,799.

The spectator figures for the league since 2009:

Season	Overall	Average	Best supported club	Average	Highest attendance
2009	6,764,380	17,801	Flamengo	41,553	78,639 (Flamengo 2–1 Grêmio)
2010	5,638,806	14,839	Corinthians	27,446	76,205 (Vasco da Gama 2–2 Fluminense)
2011	5,572,673	14,664	Corinthians	29,328	63,871 (São Paulo 1–2 Flamengo)
2012	4,928,827	13,148	Corinthians	25,222	62,207 (São Paulo 2–1 Náutico)
2013	5,681,551	14,951	Cruzeiro	28,911	63,501 (Santos 0–0 Flamengo)
2014	6,208,190	16,337	Cruzeiro	29,678	58,627 (São Paulo 2–0 Cruzeiro)
2015	6,376,693	17,050	Corinthians	34,150	67,011 (Flamengo 0–2 Coritiba)
2016	5,975,926	15,809	Palmeiras	32,684	54,996 (São Paulo 2–2 Chapecoense)
2017	6,238,797	16,418	Corinthians	40,043	50,116 (Grêmio 0–1 Corinthians)
2018	7,584,444	19,959	Flamengo	50,965	62,994 (Flamengo 1–2 Athletico Paranaense)
2019	8,067,663	21,230	Flamengo	55,025	65,649 (Flamengo 1–0 CSA)

== Clubs statistics ==
The following 20 clubs will compete in the Série A in the 2026 season:

Club	Position in 2025	First season in top division	Number of seasons in top division	First season of current spell	Number of seasons of current spell	Top division titles	Last top division title
Atlético Mineiro	11th	1937	64	2007	20	3	2021
Athletico Paranaense	2nd (Série B)	1959	49	2026	1	1	2001
Bahia	7th	1959	53	2023	4	2	1988
Botafogo	6th	1962	61	2022	5	3	2024
Chapecoense	3rd (Série B)	1978	10	2026	1	0	N/A
Corinthians	13th	1967	58	2009	18	7	2017
Coritiba	1st (Série B)	1960	43	2026	1	1	1985
Cruzeiro	3rd	1960	63	2023	4	4	2014
Flamengo^{a,} ^{b}	**1st**	1964	61	1967	**59**	8	2025
Fluminense	5th	1937	61	2000	27	4	2012
Grêmio	9th	1959	**66**	2023	4	2	1996
Internacional	16th	1962	60	2018	9	3	1979
Mirassol^{a}	4th	2025	2	2025	2	0	N/A
Palmeiras	2nd	1960	63	2014	13	**12**	2023
Red Bull Bragantino	10th	1990	16	2020	7	0	N/A
Remo	4th (Série B)	1961	17	2026	1	0	N/A
Santos	12th	1959	65	2025	2	8	2004
São Paulo^{a,} ^{b}	8th	1967	59	1980	47	6	2008
Vasco da Gama	14th	1959	57	2023	4	4	2000
Vitória	15th	1965	42	2024	3	0	N/A

^{a}: Unrelegated clubs
^{b}: Clubs that never played outside the top division

=== Most appearances ===
As of 2026 season

Below is the list of clubs that have more appearances in the Campeonato Brasileiro. There are 159 teams that have taken part in 1 Copa dos Campeões Estaduais, 10 Taça Brasil, 4 Torneio Roberto Gomes Pedrosa and 55 Campeonato Brasileiro editions. The teams in bold compete in Série A currently. The year in parentheses represents the most recent year of participation at this level.

- **66** seasons: **Grêmio** (2026)
- **65** seasons: **Santos** (2026)
- **64** seasons: **Atlético Mineiro** (2026)
- **63** seasons: **Cruzeiro** (2026), **Palmeiras** (2026)
- **61** seasons: **Botafogo** (2026), **Flamengo** (2026), **Fluminense** (2026)
- **60** seasons: **Internacional** (2026)
- **59** seasons: **São Paulo** (2026)
- **58** seasons: **Corinthians** (2026)
- **57** seasons: **Vasco da Gama** (2026)
- **53** seasons: **Bahia** (2026)
- **49** seasons: **Athletico Paranaense** (2026)
- **43** seasons: **Coritiba** (2026), Goiás (2023), Sport Recife (2025)
- **42** seasons: **Vitória** (2026)
- **36** seasons: Portuguesa (2013)
- **34** seasons: Náutico (2013)
- **29** seasons: Guarani (2010)
- **27** seasons: Ceará (2025), Fortaleza (2025), Paysandu (2005)
- **24** seasons: Ponte Preta (2017), Santa Cruz (2016)
- **20** seasons: Juventude (2025)
- **19** seasons: América (MG) (2023), America (RJ) (1988), CSA (2019)
- **17** seasons: Figueirense (2016), **Remo** (2026)
- **16** seasons: Desportiva (1993), Nacional (AM) (1986), Paraná (2018), **Red Bull Bragantino** (2026)
- **15** seasons: América (RN) (2007)
- **14** seasons: ABC (1985), Atlético Goianiense (2024), Criciúma (2024)
- **13** seasons: Rio Branco (ES) (1987)
- **12** seasons: Joinville (2015), Sampaio Corrêa (1986), Sergipe (1986)
- **11** seasons: Avaí (2022), Bangu (1988), Campinense (1981), CRB (1984), Moto Club (1984)
- **10** seasons: **Chapecoense** (2026), Operário (MS) (1986)
- **9** seasons: Treze (1987), Vila Nova (1985)
- **8** seasons: Americano (1983), Confiança (1984), Mixto (1985), Ríver (1982)
- **7** seasons: Botafogo (PB) (1986), Brasília (1985), Flamengo (PI) (1985), Inter de Limeira (1990), Londrina (1982), Rio Negro (AM) (1983), São Caetano (2006)
- **6** seasons: Botafogo (SP) (2001), Comercial (MS) (1986), Ferroviário (CE) (1984), Gama (2002), Goytacaz (1979), Grêmio Maringá (1982), Uberaba (1983)
- **5** seasons: Colorado (PR) (1983), Itabaiana (1982), Metropol (SC) (1968), Tiradentes (PI) (1983)
- **4** seasons: Anapolina (1984), Brasil de Pelotas (1985), Caxias (1979), Cuiabá (2024), Fluminense de Feira (1979), Goiânia (1979), Operário (MT) (1986), Piauí (1986), Tuna Luso (1986), Uberlândia (1985), União São João (1997)
- **3** seasons: Alecrim (1986), CEUB (1975), Dom Bosco (1979), Fast Clube (1979), Ferroviário (PR) (1967), Fonseca (1963), Leônico (1985), Maranhão (1980), Pinheiros (PR) (1985), Rabello (1969), São Paulo (RS) (1982), Villa Nova (MG) (1985), Volta Redonda (1978), XV de Piracicaba (1979)
- **2** seasons: América (SP) (1980), Campo Grande (RJ) (1983), Capelense (1962), Central (1986), Comercial (SP) (1979), Galícia (1983), Grêmio Barueri (2010), Itabuna (1979), **Mirassol** (2026), Olaria (1974), Santa Cruz (SE) (1961), Santo André (2009), Santo Antônio (ES) (1962), São José (SP) (1990), XV de Jaú (1982)
- **1** season: Alliança de Campos (1937), América (CE) (1967), América de Propriá (1967), Anápolis (1966), ASA (1979), Auto Esporte (PB) (1959), Auto Esporte (PI) (1984), Brasiliense (2005), Caldense (1979), Catuense (1984), AA Colatina (1979), Comercial (PR) (1962), Corumbaense (1973), Cruzeiro do Sul (DF) (1964), Defelê (1963), Eletrovapo (RJ) (1965), Estrela do Mar (PB) (1960), Ferroviária (1983), Ferroviário (MA) (1959), Francana (1979), Guanabara (DF) (1965), Guará (1979), Hercílio Luz (1959), Inter de Lages (1966), Inter de Santa Maria (1982), Ipatinga (2008), Itumbiara (1979), J. Malucelli (2000), Juventus (SP) (1983), Liga da Marinha (1937), AD Niterói (1959), Noroeste (1978), Novo Hamburgo (1979), Olímpico (AM) (1968), Olímpico (SC) (1965), Operário Ferroviário (1979), Paula Ramos (1960), Perdigão (1967), Potiguar de Mossoró (1979), Rio Branco (RJ) (1962), São Bento (1979), Siderúrgica (1965), Sobradinho (1986), Taguatinga (1982), Vitória (ES) (1977)

Considers the green and yellow modules of the Copa União, the blue group of the Copa João Havelange and the participants of the knockout stage (Paraná, São Caetano, Remo and J. Malucelli)

=== Clubs relegated from Série A ===
Taça de Ouro era

Clubs are relegated from Taça de Ouro to Taça de Prata of the same year, likewise happens today in international club competitions (3rd place of Copa Libertadores to Copa Sudamericana knock-out playoff). The last place of each group and the four clubs that lost in the repechage play-off were sent to the dispute of Taça de Prata.

Year	Clubs
1982	Nacional (AM) (Group A), Ríver (Group B), Ferroviário (Group C), Itabaiana (Group D), Mixto (Group E), Vitória (Group F), Taguatinga (Group G), Joinville (Group H); América de Natal (Play-off loser), CSA (Play-off loser), Goiás (Play-off loser), Desportiva (Play-off loser)
1983	Moto Club (Group A), Joinville (Group B), Galícia (Group C), Fortaleza (Group D), Mixto (Group E), Rio Branco (ES) (Group F), Brasília (Group G), Treze (Group H); Paysandu (Play-off loser), CSA (Play-off loser), Juventus (Play-off loser), Ferroviário (Play-off loser)

Copa União

Year	Clubs
1987	~~Santos, Corinthians~~

According to the regulation, The 15th (Santos) and 16th (Corinthians) placed teams would play the 1988 Second Level. However, the Clube dos 13, organizer of the Copa União, and the Confederação Brasileira de Futebol, put an end to the litigation between the associations, and the 1988 championship was again organized entirely by the CBF, making the relegations invalid.

Knock-out tournament

Year	Clubs
1988	Bangu, Santa Cruz, Criciúma, America (RJ)
1989	Atlético Paranaense, Guarani, Sport
1990	São José (SP), Inter de Limeira
1991	Grêmio, Vitória
1992	None
1993	América Mineiro, Ceará, Coritiba, Atlético Paranaense, Santa Cruz, Goiás, Fortaleza, Desportiva
1994	Remo, Náutico
1995	Paysandu, União São João
1996	Canceled
1997	Bahia, Criciúma, Fluminense, União São João
1998	América Mineiro, Goiás, Bragantino, América de Natal
1999	See Copa João Havelange
2000	None
2001	Santa Cruz, América Mineiro, Botafogo (SP), Sport
2002	Portuguesa, Palmeiras, Gama, Botafogo

Round-robin tournament

Year	Clubs (points)
2003	Fortaleza (49), Bahia (46)
2004	Criciúma (50), Guarani (49), Vitória (49), Grêmio (39)
2005	Coritiba (49), Atlético Mineiro (47), Paysandu (41), Brasiliense (41)
2006	Ponte Preta (39), Fortaleza (38), São Caetano (36), Santa Cruz (28)
2007	Corinthians (44), Paraná (43), Juventude (41), América de Natal (17)
2008	Figueirense (44), Vasco da Gama (40), Portuguesa (38), Ipatinga (35)
2009	Coritiba (45), Santo André (41), Náutico (38), Sport (31)
2010	Vitória (42), Guarani (37), Goiás (33), Grêmio Prudente (28)
2011	Atlético Paranaense (41), Ceará (39), América Mineiro (37), Avaí (31)
2012	Sport (41), Palmeiras (34), Atlético Goianiense (30), Figueirense (30)
2013	Portuguesa (44), Vasco da Gama (44), Ponte Preta (37), Náutico (20)
2014	Vitória (38), Bahia (37), Botafogo (34), Criciúma (32)
2015	Avaí (42), Vasco da Gama (41), Goiás (38), Joinville (31)
2016	Internacional (43), Figueirense (37), Santa Cruz (31), América Mineiro (28)
2017	Coritiba (43), Avaí (43), Ponte Preta (39), Atlético Goianiense (36)
2018	América Mineiro (40), Sport (39), Vitória (37), Paraná (23)
2019	Cruzeiro (36), CSA (32), Chapecoense (32), Avaí (20)
2020	Vasco da Gama (41), Goiás (37), Coritiba (31), Botafogo (27)
2021	Grêmio (43), Bahia (43), Sport (38), Chapecoense (15)
2022	Ceará (37), Atlético Goianiense (36), Avaí (35), Juventude (22)
2023	Santos (43), Goiás (38), Coritiba (30), América Mineiro (24)
2024	Athletico Paranaense (42), Criciúma (38), Atlético Goianiense (30), Cuiabá (30)
2025	Ceará (43), Fortaleza (43), Juventude (35), Sport (17)

1. América-MG was suspended for 2 years in 1994, because they contested their relegation in a civil court instead the sports court. In 1996 the team would return to the Série B (2nd level).
2. Sports court (STJD) canceled all relegations in 1996 season, sparing Fluminense and Bragantino.
3. Fluminense is spared from relegation after the end of championship. Sports court deducted 4 points from Portuguesa and 4 points for Flamengo, for fielding an ineligible players (Héverton and André Santos, respectively).

== Individual statistics ==
=== Most appearances ===
Rank	Player	Pos.	Apps
1	Fábio	GK	753
2	Rogério Ceni	GK	575
3	Léo Moura	DF	497
4	Diego Souza	FW	472
5	Cássio	GK	450
6	Fábio Santos	MF	444
7	Wellington Paulista	FW	442
8	Thiago Heleno	DF	429
9	Fagner	DF	415
10	Weverton	GK	411

=== Top goalscorers ===
Rank	Player	Goals
1	Roberto Dinamite	190
2	Fred	158
3	Romário	154
4	Edmundo	153
5	Zico	135
6	Diego Souza	131
7	Túlio	129
8	Serginho Chulapa	127
9	Washington	126
10	Gabriel Barbosa	119

Notes:

- All players are Brazilian, unless otherwise noted.
- Italics denotes players still playing professional football, and **bold** denotes players still playing in the Brazilian Série A.

=== Most clean sheets ===
Rank	Country	Goalkeeper	Clean sheets
1	(Brazil)	Fábio	243
2	(Brazil)	Cássio	173
3	(Brazil)	Weverton	166
4	(Brazil)	Rogerio Ceni	146
5	(Brazil)	Victor	120
6	(Brazil)	Vanderlei	119
7	(Brazil)	Marcelo Lomba	106
8	(Brazil)	Everson	101
9	(Brazil)	Marcelo Grohe	99
10	(Brazil)	Fernando Prass	98

=== Most assists ===
Rank	Country	Player	Assists
1	(Uruguay)	Giorgian de Arrascaeta	82
2	(Brazil)	Marcelinho Carioca	77
3	(Brazil)	Edmundo	73
4	(Brazil)	Everton Ribeiro	71
5	(Brazil)	Dudu	68
6	(Brazil)	Gustavo Scarpa	68
7	(Brazil)	Pelé	63
8	(Brazil)	Zico	62
9	(Brazil)	Diego Souza	60
10	(Serbia)	Dejan Petković	59

Most assists by a player in a single season

- 19 assists.
  - (Argentina) Dario Conca (Fluminense) – (2010)

=== Multiple hat-tricks ===
Rank	Country	Player	Hat-tricks
1	(Brazil)	Bruno Henrique	5
2	(Brazil)	Neymar	4
3	(Brazil)	Gabriel Barbosa	3
3	(Brazil)	Fred	3
3	(Brazil)	Obina	3
3	(Brazil)	Yuri Alberto	3
7	(Brazil)	Aloisio	2
7	(Brazil)	Carlos Vinícius	2
7	(Brazil)	Gilberto	2
7	(Brazil)	Pedro	2
7	(Brazil)	Pele	2
7	(Brazil)	Ronaldinho	2
7	(Brazil)	Val Baiano	2
14	Several players		1

Most hat-tricks by a player in a single season

- 3 hat-tricks.
  - Fred - (Fluminense) (2011)

== Awards and trophies ==
Prêmio Craque do Brasileirão is the league's official award. Placar magazine's Bola de Ouro is the oldest award, while the Troféu Osmar Santos and the Troféu João Saldanha are awards given by the newspaper Lance!.

== See also ==
- Campeonato Brasileiro tournament scheduling, historical development of Campeonato Brasileiro from 1971 until today.
- Campeonato Brasileiro Série B, the second division of Brazilian football
- Campeonato Brasileiro Série C, the third division of Brazilian football
- Campeonato Brasileiro Série D, the fourth division of Brazilian football
- Campeonato Brasileiro Sub-20, the official U-20 national football tournament
- Campeonato Brasileiro de Seleções Estaduais, the tournament contested by state teams between 1922–1962 and in 1987.
- List of foreign Campeonato Brasileiro Série A players
- Torneio Rio-São Paulo, the inter-state competition between São Paulo and Rio de Janeiro, the two strongest football states at the era, held from 1950 to 1966, in 1993 and 1997 to 2002.
- Torneio Roberto Gomes Pedrosa, the national tournament from 1967 to 1970
- Copa do Brasil, the main knockout football competition of Brazilian football
- History of football in Brazil
- Campeonato Brasileiro de Futebol Feminino Série A1, the main division of women's Brazilian football
