= Wolter Robilotta =

Brazilian footballer

Robilotta
Personal information
- Full name: Wolter Robilotta
- Date of birth: 6 February 1945
- Place of birth: São Paulo, Brazil
- Date of death: 8 June 2011 (aged 66)
- Place of death: Belém, Brazil
- Position: Forward

Senior career*
Years	Team	Apps	(Gls)
1965–1967	Vasco da Gama		
1966–1967	→ Paysandu (loan)		
1968–1971	Remo		
1972	Paysandu		
- * Club domestic league appearances and goals as of 29 November 2023

Wolter Robilotta (6 February 1945 – 8 June 2011), was a Brazilian professional footballer who played as a forward.

== Career ==
Robilotta arrived in Pará football from Vasco da Gama on loan to Paysandu, and became state champion in 1966 and 1967. In 1968, he was bought permanently by rival Remo, where he was again champion in 1968. In 1971, he became the first top scorer in an edition of the Brazilian Championship Series B.

== Death ==
He was reported missing and later found dead on 8 June 2011. The cause of death was identified as a massive heart attack.

== Honours ==
Paysandu

- Campeonato Paraense: 1966, 1967, 1972

Remo

- Campeonato Paraense: 1968
- Torneio Norte-Nordeste: 1971
- Torneio do Norte: 1968, 1969, 1971

Individual

- 1971 Campeonato Brasileiro Série B top scorer: 4 goals
