= 1971 Torneio do Norte =

Tournament details
- Country: Brazil
- Dates: 17 October – 28 November
- Teams: 12

Final positions
- Champions: (Pará) Remo (3rd title)
- Runners-up: (Amazonas (Brazilian state)) Rodoviária

The 1971 Torneio do Norte or Taça Norte was the fourth and last edition of a football competition held in Brazil, featuring 12 clubs. Remo won your third title and earn the right to play in the 1971 Torneio Norte-Nordeste.

== Amazonas selective ==
=== Quarter-final ===
Team 1	Score	Team 2
Sul América (Amazonas (Brazilian state))	0–0 (5–3 p)	(Amazonas (Brazilian state)) Rio Negro
Nacional (Amazonas (Brazilian state))	1–0	(Amazonas (Brazilian state)) América
Rodoviária (Amazonas (Brazilian state))	0–0 (4–2 p)	(Amazonas (Brazilian state)) Olímpico
Fast Clube (Amazonas (Brazilian state))	0–0 (3–2 p)	(Amazonas (Brazilian state)) São Raimundo

=== Semi-final ===
Team 1	Score	Team 2
Nacional (Amazonas (Brazilian state))	1–0	(Amazonas (Brazilian state)) Sul América
Rodoviária (Amazonas (Brazilian state))	1–0	(Amazonas (Brazilian state)) Fast Clube

=== Final ===
Team 1	Score	Team 2
Rodoviária (Amazonas (Brazilian state))	1–0	(Amazonas (Brazilian state)) Nacional

== Pará selective ==
Pos	Team	Pld	W	D	L	GF	GA	GD	Pts	Qualification
1	(Pará) Remo (A)	6	3	2	1	7	1	+6	8	Advance to the Finals
2	(Pará) Tuna Luso	6	2	4	0	5	1	+4	8	
3	(Pará) Paysandu	6	1	3	2	3	5	−2	5	
4	(Pará) Sport Belém	6	1	1	4	2	10	−8	3	

Source: RSSSF Brasil
(A) Advance to a further round

== Finals ==
25 November 1971

Remo (Pará)	1–0	(Amazonas (Brazilian state)) Rodoviária
Carlitinho 87'	Report

Baenão, Belém
Referee: Artur Brás

28 November 1971

Rodoviária (Amazonas (Brazilian state))	2–4	(Pará) Remo
Paulo Borges 6'; Hércules 78'	Report	Tito 50'; Rubilota 56'; Alcindo 66'; Tarciso 88'

Baenão, Belém
Referee: Artur Brás

Remo won 5–2 on aggregate.
