= 1968 Torneio Norte-Nordeste =

Tournament details
- Country: Brazil

Final positions
- Champions: (Pernambuco) Sport (1st title)
- Runners-up: (Pará) Remo

The 1968 Torneio Norte-Nordeste was the first edition of a football competition held in Brazil. In the finals, Sport defeated Remo 5–2 on aggregate to win their first title and earn the right to play in the Torneio dos Campeões da CBD.

== North Zone ==
Team 1	Series	Team 2	Game 1	Game 2	Game 3
Piauí	7–7	(Pará) Remo	5–1	1–4	1–2

== Northeast Zone ==
=== Final stage ===
Pos	Team	Pld	W	D	L	GF	GA	GD	Pts	Qualification
1	(Pernambuco) Sport (C, Q)	6	5	0	1	13	6	+7	10	Champions and qualified to the Torneio Norte-Nordeste Finals
2	(Alagoas) CSA	6	3	1	2	11	10	+1	7	
3	(Pernambuco) Santa Cruz	6	2	2	2	10	11	−1	6	
4	(Ceará) Calouros do Ar	6	0	1	5	3	10	−7	1	

Source: RSSSF Brasil
(C) Champions; (Q) Qualified for the phase indicated

== Finals ==
23 February 1969

Remo (Pará)	1–3	(Pernambuco) Sport

Baenão, Belém

2 March 1969

Sport (Pernambuco)	2–1	(Pará) Remo

Estádio Ilha do Retiro, Recife

Sport won 5–2 on aggregate.
