= 1963 Campeonato Brasileiro Série A =

Campeonato Brasileiro Série A
- Season: 1963
- Dates: 7 August 1963 – 28 January 1964
- Champions: Santos (3rd title)
- Copa Libertadores: Santos (title holder); Bahia
- Matches: 45
- Goals: 120 (2.67 per match)
- Top goalscorer: Ruiter - Confiança (9 goals)
- Biggest home win: Santos 6-0 Bahia

The 1963 Campeonato Brasileiro Série A (officially the 1963 Taça Brasil) was the 6th edition of the Campeonato Brasileiro Série A.

== Format ==
The competition was a single elimination knockout tournament featuring two-legged ties, with a Tie-Break (play-off) if the sides were tied on points (however, if the tie-break was a draw, the aggregate score of the first two legs was used to determine the winner).

== Teams ==
Twenty state champions qualified for the tournament including, for the first time, the champions of the Federal District and Goiás.

Team	Home city	Home ground
(Rio Grande do Norte) ABC	Natal	
(Minas Gerais) Atlético Mineiro	Belo Horizonte	
Bahia	Salvador	
(Guanabara (state)) Botafogo	Rio de Janeiro	
(Paraíba) Campinense	Campina Grande	
(Alagoas) Capelense	Capela	
Ceará	Fortaleza	
(Sergipe) Confiança	Aracaju	
(Federal District (Brazil)) Defelê	Brasília	
(Rio de Janeiro (state)) Fonseca	Niterói	
(Rio Grande do Sul) Grêmio	Porto Alegre	
(Paraná (state)) Londrina	Londrina	
(Santa Catarina (state)) Metropol	Criciúma	
(Pará) Paysandu	Belém	
(Espírito Santo) Rio Branco	Vitória	
(Maranhão) Sampaio Corrêa	São Luís	
(São Paulo (state)) Santos	Santos	
(Pernambuco) Sport Recife	Recife	
(Piauí) River	Teresina	
(Goiás) Vila Nova	Goiânia	

== Northern Zone ==
=== Northeastern Group ===
First Phase			Scores		
	Points		1st leg	2nd leg	Tie-break
Campinense	2 : 2	ABC	2 - 2	0 - 0	4 - 2
Capelense	2 : 2	Confiança	3 - 1	0 - 2	1 - 3

Second Phase			Scores	
	Points		1st leg	2nd leg
Confiança	4 : 0	Campinense	2 - 0	4 - 3

Semi-Final			Scores		
	Points		1st leg	2nd leg	Tie-break
Ceará	2 : 2	Confiança	2 - 4	1 - 0	2 - 0

Final			Scores		
	Points		1st leg	2nd leg	Tie-break
Bahia	2 : 2	Ceará	1 - 1	0 - 0	1 - 0

=== Northern Group ===
First Phase			Scores		
	Points		1st leg	2nd leg	Tie-break
Sampaio Corrêa	2 : 2	River	3 - 0	0 - 2	1 - 2

Semi-Final			Scores	
	Points		1st leg	2nd leg
River	0 : 4	Paysandu	1 - 3	0 - 1

Final			Scores	
	Points		1st leg	2nd leg
Paysandu	0 : 4	Sport Recife	0 - 1	0 - 2

=== Northern Zone Final ===
			Scores	
	Points		1st leg	2nd leg
Sport Recife	1 : 3	Bahia	2 - 2	0 - 1

== Southern Zone ==
=== Southern Group ===
Semi-Final			Scores	
	Points		1st leg	2nd leg
Londrina	0 : 4	Metropol	2 - 3	1 - 2

Final			Scores	
	Points		1st leg	2nd leg
Grêmio	3 : 1	Metropol	1 - 1	2 - 0

=== Central Group ===
First Phase			Scores		
	Points		1st leg	2nd leg	Tie-break
Vila Nova	4 : 0	Defelê	2 - 0	3 - 0	—
Rio Branco	2 : 2	Fonseca	0 - 1	3 - 0	2 - 2
Rio Branco progressed thanks to a better Goal Difference over the first 2 legs.

Semi-Final			Scores		
	Points		1st leg	2nd leg	Tie-break
Rio Branco	2 : 2	Vila Nova	0 - 1	1 - 0	1 - 0

Final			Scores	
	Points		1st leg	2nd leg
Atlético Mineiro	3 : 1	Rio Branco	1 - 0	1 - 1

=== Southern Zone Final ===
			Scores	
	Points		1st leg	2nd leg
Atlético Mineiro	1 : 3	Grêmio	1 - 1	1 - 2

== National Semi-Finals ==
Botafogo and Santos entered in this stage

			Scores	
	Points		1st leg	2nd leg
Bahia	3 : 1	Botafogo	1 - 0	0 - 0
Grêmio	0 : 4	Santos	1 - 3	3 - 4

== National Final ==
			Scores	
	Points		1st leg	2nd leg
Santos	4 : 0	Bahia	6 - 0	2 - 0
