= Albérico (footballer) =

Brazilian footballer (born 1946)

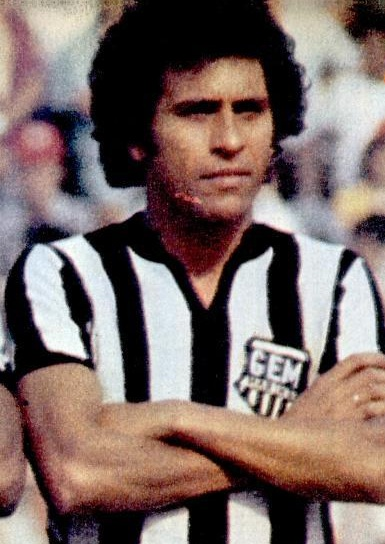
- Albérico in 1977

Personal information
- Full name: Albérico Luiz Pereira dos Santos
- Date of birth: 29 December 1946 (age 79)
- Place of birth: Recife, Pernambuco, Brazil
- Position: Left-back

Senior career*
Years	Team	Apps	(Gls)
1965–1969	Bonsucesso		
1968	→ Fluminense (loan)		
1969–1971	Fluminense		
1971	Bahia		
1972–1974	Fortaleza		
1975	Sapucaia-RJ		
1976	Americano		
1977	Noroeste		
1977–1978	Grêmio Maringá		
1978–1980	Comercial		
1980	Nacional–SP		
1980–1981	ABC		
- * Club domestic league appearances and goals

Albérico Luiz Pereira dos Santos (born 29 December 1946), better known as Albérico is a retired Brazilian footballer. He played as a left-back for various clubs throughout the late 1960s and the 1970s and was most known for his tenures with Fluminense, Bahia and Grêmio Maringá.

== Career ==
Following a loan to Fluminense for the 1968 season, the second half of the 1969 season saw Albérico transferred to the squad as a permanent addition. He'd remain with the club throughout the 1970 and 1971 seasons. During his tenure with the club, he was a part of the winning squad of the 1970 Campeonato Brasileiro Série A which was the Tricolor's first national title as well as two other titles by the time of his departure.

During the second half of the 1971 season, he played for Bahia for 20 games as the team's left-back under club manager Jorge Vieira. Throughout his 20 appearances, he was a part of the winning squad of the 1971 Campeonato Baiano. This would be until he was replaced with Nelson Souza for the last three games. For the following few years, he'd play for a variety of clubs on a temporary basis with minimal appearances. His next major role occurred with Grêmio Maringá for the 1977 season as well being a part of the winning squad for the 1977 Campeonato Paranaense which would be the last title the club would obtain in the tournament as of 2026. He'd continue to play for the club by the first half of the 1978 season. His last club would be for ABC in the second half of the 1980 season and retired by the end of 1981.
