= 1970 Torneio do Norte =

Tournament details
- Country: Brazil
- Dates: 18 October – 25 November
- Teams: 6

Final positions
- Champions: (Amazonas (Brazilian state)) Fast Clube (1st title)
- Runners-up: (Pará) Tuna Luso

Tournament statistics
- Matches played: 15
- Goals scored: 36 (2.4 per match)

The 1970 Torneio do Norte was the third edition of a football competition held in Brazil, featuring 6 clubs. Fast Clube won your first title and earn the right to play in the 1970 Torneio Norte-Nordeste.

== Classification ==
Pos	Team	Pld	W	D	L	GF	GA	GD	Pts	Qualification
1	(Amazonas (Brazilian state)) Fast Clube (C, Q)	5	2	3	0	9	5	+4	7	Champions and qualified to the 1970 Torneio Norte-Nordeste
2	(Pará) Tuna Luso (Q)	5	3	1	1	7	5	+2	7	Qualified to the 1970 Torneio Norte-Nordeste
3	(Pará) Paysandu	5	1	4	0	6	5	+1	6	
4	(Pará) Remo	5	1	2	2	4	6	−2	4	
5	(Amazonas (Brazilian state)) Rio Negro	5	1	2	2	7	9	−2	4	
6	(Amazonas (Brazilian state)) Nacional	5	0	2	3	3	6	−3	2	

Source: RSSSF Brasil
(C) Champions; (Q) Qualified for the phase indicated
