= Torneio dos Campeões da CBD =

Brazilian football competition held in 1969

Torneio dos Campeões da CBD was a Brazilian football competition held in 1969 with the objective of qualifying a team for the 1970 Copa Libertadores. Grêmio Maringá was declared as the champions after Botafogo forfeited the final after CBD decided not to have Brazilian teams competing in the 1970 Copa Libertadores.

== Participating teams ==
Team	State	Qualifying competition
Botafogo	Rio de Janeiro	1968 Taça Brasil champions
Grêmio Maringá	Paraná	1968 Torneio Centro-Sul champions
Santos	São Paulo	1968 Torneio Roberto Gomes Pedrosa champions
Sport	Pernambuco	1968 Torneio Norte-Nordeste champions

== Games ==
Quarterfinals
Grêmio Maringá	3	3	6
Sport	0	0	0

Semifinals
Grêmio Maringá	1	2	3
Santos^{(1)}	1	2	3

Finals
Grêmio Maringá	1	1	2
Botafogo^{(2)}	0	0	0

^{(1)}Santos forfeited to play the replay game thus Grêmio Maringá was awarded with a 1-0 win.

^{(2)}Botafogo forfeited to play the finals thus Grêmio Maringá was awarded with a 1-0 win in both games.

Torneio dos Campeões da CBD
1969 Champion

Grêmio Maringá
1st Title
