= 1968 Torneio do Norte =

Tournament details
- Country: Brazil
- Dates: 11 October 1968 – 14 February 1969
- Teams: 9

Final positions
- Champions: (Pará) Remo (1st title)
- Runners-up: Piauí

Tournament statistics
- Goals scored: 119

The 1968 Torneio do Norte was the first edition of a football competition held in Brazil, featuring 9 clubs. In the finals, Remo defeated Piauí 2–1 in the playoff game, after losing the first game 5-1 and winning the second 4–1 to win their first title and earn the right to play in the finals of 1968 Torneio Norte-Nordeste.

== Group stage ==
=== Group 1 ===
Pos	Team	Pld	W	D	L	GF	GA	GD	Pts	Qualification
1	(Pará) Paysandu (A)	6	3	1	2	9	5	+4	10	Advance to Knockout stage
2	(Amazonas (Brazilian state)) Nacional (A)	6	2	3	1	8	8	0	9	Advance to Knockout stage
3	(Pará) Tuna Luso	6	2	2	2	8	7	+1	8	
4	(Amazonas (Brazilian state)) Fast Clube	6	0	4	2	5	10	−5	4	

Source: RSSSF Brasil
(A) Advance to a further round

=== Group 2 ===
Pos	Team	Pld	W	D	L	GF	GA	GD	Pts	Qualification
1	Piauí (A)	8	6	0	2	18	6	+12	18	Advance to Knockout stage
2	(Pará) Remo (A)	8	4	2	2	17	8	+9	14	Advance to Knockout stage
3	(Maranhão) Ferroviário	8	4	2	2	14	11	+3	14	
4	(Maranhão) Moto Club	8	2	2	4	7	11	−4	8	
5	(Piauí) Flamengo	8	1	0	7	5	25	−20	3	

Source: RSSSF Brasil
(A) Advance to a further round

== Knockout stage ==
=== Semi-finals ===
Team 1	Agg.	Team 2	1st leg	2nd leg
Paysandu (Pará)	1–4	Piauí	0–2	1–2

Team 1	Series	Team 2	Game 1	Game 2	Game 3
Nacional (Amazonas (Brazilian state))	3–6	(Pará) Remo	3–1	0–3	0–2

=== Finals ===
Team 1	Series	Team 2	Game 1	Game 2	Game 3
Piauí	7–7	(Pará) Remo	5–1	1–4	1–2

== Play-off match final ==
14 February 1969

Remo (Pará)	2–1	Piauí
Adinamar 3',		Sima 33'

Baenão, Belém
Referee: Arnaldo Cézar Coelho
