= 1969 Torneio do Norte =

Tournament details
- Country: Brazil
- Dates: 24 September – 10 December
- Teams: 12

Final positions
- Champions: (Pará) Remo (2nd title)
- Runners-up: (Maranhão) Ferroviário

The 1969 Torneio do Norte was the second edition of a football competition held in Brazil, featuring 12 clubs. Remo won your second title and earn the right to play in the finals of 1969 Torneio Norte-Nordeste.

== First stage ==
=== Group 1 ===
==== Subgroup A ====
Pos	Team	Pld	W	D	L	GF	GA	GD	Pts	Qualification
1	(Piauí) Flamengo (A)	10	8	1	1	21	9	+12	17	Advance to Final stage
2	(Piauí) River	10	3	2	5	19	22	−3	8	
3	Piauí	10	3	1	6	17	19	−2	7	

Source: RSSSF Brasil
(A) Advance to a further round

==== Subgroup B ====
Pos	Team	Pld	W	D	L	GF	GA	GD	Pts	Qualification
1	(Maranhão) Ferroviário (A)	9	6	1	2	14	8	+6	13	Advance to Final stage
2	(Maranhão) Sampaio Corrêa	10	3	2	5	13	16	−3	8	
3	Maranhão	9	2	1	6	13	23	−10	5	

Source: RSSSF Brasil
(A) Advance to a further round

=== Group 2 ===
==== Subgroup A ====
Pos	Team	Pld	W	D	L	GF	GA	GD	Pts	Qualification
1	(Pará) Remo (A)	10	8	1	1	19	6	+13	17	Advance to Final stage
2	(Pará) Tuna Luso	10	4	4	2	16	9	+7	12	
3	(Pará) Paysandu	10	3	5	2	15	10	+5	11	

Source: RSSSF Brasil
(A) Advance to a further round

==== Subgroup B ====
Pos	Team	Pld	W	D	L	GF	GA	GD	Pts	Qualification
1	(Amazonas (Brazilian state)) Nacional (A)	10	4	2	4	10	15	−5	10	Advance to Final stage
2	(Amazonas (Brazilian state)) Olímpico	10	2	2	6	7	17	−10	6	
3	(Amazonas (Brazilian state)) Fast Clube	10	1	2	7	11	21	−10	4	

Source: RSSSF Brasil
(A) Advance to a further round

== Final stage ==
Pos	Team	Pld	W	D	L	GF	GA	GD	Pts	Qualification
1	(Pará) Remo (C, Q)	6	3	2	1	9	5	+4	8	Champions and qualified to the Torneio Norte-Nordeste Finals
2	(Maranhão) Ferroviário	6	3	1	2	7	7	0	7	
3	(Amazonas (Brazilian state)) Nacional	6	1	3	2	7	7	0	5	
4	(Piauí) Flamengo	6	1	2	3	3	7	−4	4	

Source: RSSSF Brasil
(C) Champions; (Q) Qualified for the phase indicated
