= Grêmio de Esportes Maringá =

Grêmio Maringá
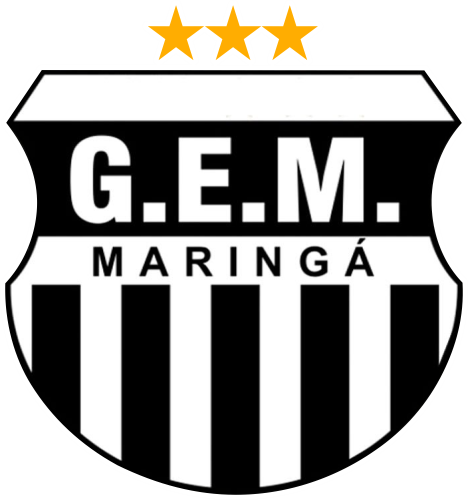
- Full name: Grêmio de Esportes Maringá
- Nicknames: Galo Guerreiro; Galo de Ouro; Galo do Norte
- Founded: 7 July 1961; 65 years ago
- Ground: Estádio Willie Davids, Maringá, Paraná, Brazil
- Capacity: 14,995
- President: David Marcelo Ferreira
- Head coach: Rafael Camarotta
- League: Campeonato Paranaense Série Prata
- 2023: 8º
- Website: https://www.gremiodemaringa.com.br/
Home colors	Away colors	Third colors

Grêmio de Esportes Maringá is a Brazilian football club from the city of Maringá, in Paraná state.

== History ==
Grêmio Maringá is a traditional club from the city of Maringá. The club has won three times state champion (1963, 1964 and 1977) and they were four times runner-up (1965, 1967, 1981 and 2002). The club has played four times the 1st division of the Brazilian Championship and several times the 1st division of Paraná. They were deactivated in 2004 after being relegated to Campeonato Paranaense Second Level and returned to its activities in 2010. They are currently in the 2nd Division of the Campeonato Paranaense and have their games in Willie Davids Stadium, which currently has capacity for 14,995 fans.

=== The start ===
In 1961, Maringá sportsmen gathered at the initiative of founding a football team. Thus, on July 7 was born the Grêmio de Esportes Maringá'. The club would use the black and white on their uniform. His debut in the state occurs in the following year. Becomes three-time champion of the Interior in 1963, 1964 and 1965, and Paranaense champion in 1963 and 1964. In 1969, the club took the Tournament of Champions of the CBD, and assured its spot in the Copa Libertadores in 1970, but Brazil has decided not to take any representative for the competition, making the Guild failed to play their unique liberators in history.

In 1971, the Willie Davids Stadium was built, nicknamed at the time as Stadium of Araucaria, the time came to have the stadium seats 35,000 fans. By improving the comfort and the introduction of chairs, the capacity was reduced to 21,600.

In 1977, the club became State Champion for the 3rd time in its history, and in 1981 was runner-up. After these good campaigns, the club made just regular campaigns in subsequent years.

In 1998, became vice-champion of Paraná Cup, losing the final to Clube Atlético Paranaense. The club won said tournament in 1999, beating Londrina Esporte Clube in the final.

In 2002, without the presence of the three top Paraná state clubs (Clube Atlético Paranaense, Coritiba Foot Ball Club, and Paraná Clube), Grêmio Maringá made a good campaign and managed to be runner-up in the state championship, losing the title to Iraty. Two years later, the club was relegated to the 2nd division of Paraná but announced that it would not compete in 2005. For this reason, the team closed its doors until 2010, when the new president, Aurélio Almeida, announced that the club would become active again.

After that changed again the clubs' owner and in 2022 won the Campeonato Paranaense Série Bronze, the 3rd tier of Paraná's football. Since 2023 Grêmio Maringá is playing Campeonato Paranaense Série Prata, the 2nd tier of Paraná's football.

== Rivalries ==
=== Clássico do Café (Coffee Derby) ===
The Clássico do Café (Coffee Derby) is one of the major classics of Paraná and a principal of the interior of Brazil, played between Grêmio Maringá and Londrina. The classic has emerged in the 1960s with the founding of the club Maringá era of wealth from coffee plantations in the region who named the name of the classic.

It reached its height in the 1970s and 1980s, when the two clubs fought deadly battles with packed arenas. The two clubs won six Paraná state titles and several titles from the inside. The Londrina Esporte Clube was Champion of the 2nd division of the Brazilian Championship in 1981 and Grêmio Maringá was champion of the Tournament of Champions of the CBD in 1969, this tournament equivalent of Copa do Brasil.

Currently the derby does not have the same prestige, the Londrina Esporte Clube is playing in the 1st division of the Paranaense Championship in 2014 and Grêmio de Esportes Maringá after five years of inactivity, will compete in 2014 in the 2nd or 3rd Division of the Paraná.

=== Derby Maringaense (Maringaense Derby) ===
The "Derby Maringaense" is far from the value and importance of the Coffee Derby, its played between Grêmio Maringá and Maringá FC, began to be disputed in 2010 and the record is as follows:

- Matches: 6
- Grêmio Maringá Wins: 2
- Draws: 1
- Maringá FC Wins: 3
- Grêmio Maringá Goals: 7
- Maringá FC Goals: 14

== Honours ==
=== National ===
- Torneio dos Campeões da CBD
  - Winners (1): 1969

=== Regional ===
- Torneio Centro-Sul
  - Winners (1): 1968

=== State ===
- Campeonato Paranaense
  - Winners (3): 1963, 1964, 1977
  - Runners-up (4): 1965, 1967, 1981, 2002
- Copa Paraná
  - Winners (1): 1999
  - Runners-up (1): 1998
- Campeonato Paranaense Série Prata
  - Winners (1): 2001
- Campeonato Paranaense Série Bronze
  - Winners (1): 2022
- Campeonato Paranaense do Interior
  - Winners (8): 1963, 1964, 1965, 1967, 1977, 1978, 1979, 1984
- Torneio Início do Paraná
  - Winners (1): 1989

== CBF Ranking ==
Grêmio Maringá

- Position: 81
- Score: 154 points

Ranking created by Brazilian Football Confederation points out that all teams in the Brazil.
