= 1971 Torneio Norte-Nordeste =

Tournament details
- Country: Brazil

Final positions
- Champions: (Pará) Remo (1st title)
- Runners-up: (Sergipe) Itabaiana

The 1971 Torneio Norte-Nordeste was the fourth edition of a football competition held in Brazil. In the finals, Remo defeated Itabaiana 2–0 on aggregate to win their first title and earn the right to play in the finals of 1971 Campeonato Brasileiro Série B.

== North Zone ==
Team 1	Agg.	Team 2	1st leg	2nd leg
Remo (Pará)	5–2	(Amazonas (Brazilian state)) Rodoviária	1–0	4–2

== Northeast Zone ==
Pos	Team	Pld	W	D	L	GF	GA	GD	Pts	Qualification
1	(Sergipe) Itabaiana (C, Q)	4	2	1	1	7	4	+3	7	Champions and qualified to the Torneio Norte-Nordeste Finals
2	(Ceará) Ferroviário	4	1	2	1	3	3	0	5	
3	(Piauí) Flamengo-PI	4	1	1	2	4	7	−3	4	

(C) Champions; (Q) Qualified for the phase indicated

== Finals ==
5 December 1971

Itabaiana (Sergipe)	0–0	(Pará) Remo

Batistão, Aracaju

8 December 1971

Remo (Pará)	2–0	(Sergipe) Itabaiana
Robilotta 60', 82'

Baenão, Belém

Remo won 2–0 on aggregate.
