= Torneio Centro-Sul =

Torneio Centro Sul
- Organising body: CBD
- Founded: 1968
- Folded: 1969
- Country: Brazil
- Number of clubs: 12
- Most championships: Grêmio Maringá (1 title)

The Torneio Centro-Sul (English: Central-South Tournament), was a football competition held during the years of 1968 and 1969, reuniting clubs of the part south of Brazil as a qualifier for the Torneio dos Campeões da CBD, likewise Torneio Norte-Nordeste. The tournament had only two editions, but ended up being abandoned due to lack of interest from clubs and the discontinuity of the Torneio dos Campeões.

== List of Champions ==
Year	Champion	Final Score	Runners-up
1968	Grêmio Maringá; PR	2–0; 2–1	Villa Nova; MG
1969	Abandoned		

== 1968 Torneio Centro Sul ==
=== Participants ===
Club	City	State
Almirante Barroso	Itajaí	(Santa Catarina (state)) Santa Catarina
América Mineiro	Belo Horizonte	Minas Gerais
Desportiva	Cariacica	Espírito Santo
Grêmio Maringá	Maringá	(Paraná (state)) Paraná
Juventude	Caxias do Sul	Rio Grande do Sul
Palmeiras	Blumenau	(Santa Catarina (state)) Santa Catarina
Rio Branco	Vitória	Espírito Santo
Santa Cruz	Santa Cruz do Sul	Rio Grande do Sul
Valerio	Itabira	Minas Gerais
Villa Nova	Nova Lima	Minas Gerais
Vitória	Vitória	Espírito Santo
União Bandeirante	Bandeirantes	(Paraná (state)) Paraná

=== Group 1 (Central) ===
Nov 20
Valerio (Minas Gerais)	1–0	(Espírito Santo) Desportiva
Nov 23
Villa Nova (Minas Gerais)	1–1	(Espírito Santo) Desportiva
Nov 26
Villa Nova (Minas Gerais)	1–1	(Minas Gerais) Valerio
Dec 4
Desportiva (Espírito Santo)	1–2	(Minas Gerais) Villa Nova
Dec 12
Desportiva (Espírito Santo)	n/p	(Minas Gerais) Valerio

The final match not played as Villa Nova had secured the classification beforehand

Team	Pts	P	W	D	L	GF	GA	GD
(Minas Gerais) Villa Nova	6	4	2	2	0	6	4	2
(Minas Gerais) Valerio	3	3	1	1	1	3	3	1
(Espírito Santo) Desportiva	1	3	0	1	2	2	4	-2

=== Group 2 (Central) ===
Nov 17
Rio Branco (Espírito Santo)	1–0	(Espírito Santo) Vitória
Nov 20
Rio Branco (Espírito Santo)	1–1	(Minas Gerais) América Mineiro
Nov 24
Vitória (Espírito Santo)	1–1	(Minas Gerais) América Mineiro
Dec 1
Vitória (Espírito Santo)	1–1	(Espírito Santo) Rio Branco
Dec 4
América Mineiro (Minas Gerais)	0–1	(Espírito Santo) Rio Branco
Dec 8
América Mineiro (Minas Gerais)	5–1	(Espírito Santo) Vitória

Team	Pts	P	W	D	L	GF	GA	GD
(Espírito Santo) Rio Branco	6	4	2	2	0	6	4	2
(Minas Gerais) América Mineiro	4	4	1	2	1	7	4	3
(Espírito Santo) Vitória	2	4	0	2	2	3	8	-5

=== Group 1 (South) ===
Nov 17
União Bandeirante (Paraná (state))	0–0	(Paraná (state)) Grêmio Maringá
Nov 20
Grêmio Maringá (Paraná (state))	4–0	(Santa Catarina (state)) Almirante Barroso
Nov 24
União Bandeirante (Paraná (state))	2–2	(Santa Catarina (state)) Almirante Barroso
Dec 1
Grêmio Maringá (Paraná (state))	1–0	(Paraná (state)) União Bandeirante
Dec 4
Almirante Barroso (Santa Catarina (state))	2–2	(Paraná (state)) Grêmio Maringá
Dec 8
Almirante Barroso (Santa Catarina (state))	2–1	(Paraná (state)) União Bandeirante

Team	Pts	P	W	D	L	GF	GA	GD
(Paraná (state)) Grêmio Maringá	6	4	2	2	0	7	2	5
(Santa Catarina (state)) Almirante Barroso	4	4	1	2	1	6	9	-3
(Paraná (state)) União Bandeirante	2	4	0	2	2	3	5	-2

=== Group 2 (South) ===
Nov 17
Juventude (Rio Grande do Sul)	1–1	(Rio Grande do Sul) Santa Cruz
Nov 20
Palmeiras (Santa Catarina (state))	0–0	(Rio Grande do Sul) Santa Cruz
Nov 24
Palmeiras (Santa Catarina (state))	3–1	(Rio Grande do Sul) Juventude
Dec 1
Santa Cruz (Rio Grande do Sul)	1–1	(Rio Grande do Sul) Juventude
Dec 4
Santa Cruz (Rio Grande do Sul)	2–0	(Santa Catarina (state)) Palmeiras
Dec 8
Juventude (Rio Grande do Sul)	n/p	(Santa Catarina (state)) Palmeiras

The final match not played as Santa Cruz had secured the classification beforehand

Team	Pts	P	W	D	L	GF	GA	GD
(Rio Grande do Sul) Santa Cruz	5	4	1	3	0	4	2	2
(Santa Catarina (state)) Palmeiras	3	3	1	1	1	3	3	0
(Rio Grande do Sul) Juventude	2	3	0	2	1	3	5	-2

=== Knockout stage ===
Semi-finals; Dec 14, 18
(Minas Gerais) Villa Nova	1	1
(Espírito Santo) Rio Branco	0	0
(Paraná (state)) Grêmio Maringá	3	7
(Rio Grande do Sul) Santa Cruz	4	0

Final; Feb 8, 12 (1969)
(Minas Gerais) Villa Nova	0	1
(Paraná (state)) Grêmio Maringá	2	2

=== Champions ===
1968 Torneio Centro-Sul
(Paraná (state))
Grêmio Maringá
1st title

== 1969 Torneio Centro Sul ==
=== Participants ===
Club	City	State
Americano	Campos dos Goytacazes	(Rio de Janeiro (state)) Rio de Janeiro
Anápolis	Anápolis	Goiás
Avaí	Florianópolis	(Santa Catarina (state)) Santa Catarina
Barra Mansa	Barra Mansa	(Rio de Janeiro (state)) Rio de Janeiro
Democrata	Governador Valadares	Minas Gerais
Desportiva	Cariacica	Espírito Santo
Internacional	Santa Maria	Rio Grande do Sul
Ipiranga	Anápolis	Goiás
Juventus	Rio do Sul	(Santa Catarina (state)) Santa Catarina
Mixto	Cuiabá	Mato Grosso
Novo Hamburgo	Novo Hamburgo	Rio Grande do Sul
Operário	Várzea Grande	Mato Grosso
Rio Branco	Vitória	Espírito Santo

Note
The second edition of the tournament as disbanded after 6 rounds played.

== See also ==
- Torneio dos Campeões da CBD
- Torneio Norte-Nordeste
- Copa Sul-Minas
- Copa Verde
