= 1968 Campeonato Brasileiro Série A (Taça Brasil) =

Campeonato Brasileiro Série A
- Season: 1968
- Champions: Botafogo (1st title)
- Matches: 54
- Goals: 135 (2.5 per match)
- Top goalscorer: Ferretti (7 goals)

The 1968 Campeonato Brasileiro Série A (officially the 1968 Taça Brasil) was the 12th edition of the Campeonato Brasileiro Série A.

== Northern Zone ==
=== First phase ===
==== Group 1 ====
Pos	Team	Pld	W	D	L	GF	GA	GD	Pts
1	(Maranhão) Moto Club	4	3	0	1	7	3	+4	6
2	(Pará) Paysandu	4	1	1	2	8	6	+2	3
3	(Amazonas (Brazilian state)) Olímpico-AM	4	1	1	2	3	9	−6	3

==== Group 2 ====
Pos	Team	Pld	W	D	L	GF	GA	GD	Pts
1	Piauí	4	4	0	0	5	0	+5	8
2	(Rio Grande do Norte) América-RN	4	1	1	2	2	4	−2	3
3	(Paraíba) Campinense	4	0	1	3	1	4	−3	1

==== Group 3 ====
Pos	Team	Pld	W	D	L	GF	GA	GD	Pts
1	Bahia	4	3	1	0	9	3	+6	7
2	(Alagoas) CSA	4	1	1	2	5	7	−2	3
3	Sergipe	4	0	2	2	3	7	−4	2

=== Second phase ===
==== Quarterfinals ====
Team 1	Agg.	Team 2	1st leg	2nd leg
Moto Club	3–2	Piauí	2–1	1–1

==== Semifinals ====
Team 1	Agg.	Team 2	1st leg	2nd leg
Bahia	6–0	Moto Club	5–0	1–0

==== Finals ====
Teams			Scores			
Team 1	Points	Team 2	1st leg	2nd leg	3rd leg	Agg.
Bahia	2:2	(Ceará) Fortaleza	1:0	0:1	1:2	–

== Central Zone ==
=== First phase ===
==== Group 1 ====
Pos	Team	Pld	W	D	L	GF	GA	GD	Pts
1	(Goiás) Atlético-GO	4	2	1	1	8	3	+5	5
2	(Mato Grosso) Operário de Várzea Grande	4	2	0	2	5	9	−4	4
3	(Federal District (Brazil)) Rabello	4	1	1	2	6	7	−1	3

==== Group 2 ====
Team 1	Agg.	Team 2	1st leg	2nd leg
Desportiva	1–2	Goytacaz	0–0	1–2

=== Second phase ===
==== Semifinals ====
Teams			Scores			
Team 1	Points	Team 2	1st leg	2nd leg	3rd leg	Agg.
Goytacaz (Rio de Janeiro (state))	2:4	(Goiás) Atlético-GO	2:0	1:2	0:2	3:4

==== Finals ====
Team 1	Agg.	Team 2	1st leg	2nd leg
Atlético-GO	2–8	Cruzeiro	1–2	1–6

== Southern Zone ==
Pos	Team	Pld	W	D	L	GF	GA	GD	Pts
1	(Santa Catarina (state)) Metropol	4	1	3	0	5	1	+4	5
2	(Rio Grande do Sul) Grêmio	4	1	3	0	2	0	+2	5
3	(Paraná (state)) Água Verde	4	1	1	2	6	7	−1	3

== Quarterfinals ==
Teams			Scores			
Team 1	Points	Team 2	1st leg	2nd leg	3rd leg	Agg.
Botafogo (Guanabara (state))	3:3	(Santa Catarina (state)) Metropol	6:1	0:1	1:1	7:3

== Semifinals ==
Teams			Scores			
Team 1	Points	Team 2	1st leg	2nd leg	3rd leg	Agg.
Cruzeiro (Minas Gerais)	1:3	(Guanabara (state)) Botafogo	0:1	1:1	–	1:2
Fortaleza (Ceará)	4:2	(Pernambuco) Náutico	2:1	1:2	1:0	4:3

== Final ==
Team 1	Agg.	Team 2	1st leg	2nd leg
Fortaleza	2–6	Botafogo	2–2	0–4
