= Torneio do Norte =

- Organising body: Brazilian Sports Confederation
- Founded: 1968
- Abolished: 1971
- Region: Brazil's North
- Number of teams: 9 (1968); 12 (1969); 6 (1970); 12 (1971)
- Most successful club(s): (Pará) Remo (3 titles)

The Torneio do Norte (English: North Tournament) was a football competition held between 1968 and 1971. The champion of the tournament gained a place in the Torneio Norte-Nordeste of the same year.

== List of champions ==
Year	Winner	Score	Runner-up	Comments
1968	(Pará) Remo	1−5; 4−1; 2–1	Piauí	Best of three
1969	(Pará) Remo	—	(Maranhão) Ferroviário	Quadrangular
1970	(Amazonas (Brazilian state)) Fast Clube	—	(Pará) Tuna Luso	Round-robin tournament
1971	(Pará) Remo	1–0; 4–2; Aggregate; 5–2	(Amazonas (Brazilian state)) Rodoviária	
