= Fonseca Atlético Clube =

Fonseca
- Full name: Fonseca Atlético Clube
- Founded: October 12, 1917
Home colours	Away colours

Fonseca Atlético Clube, is a sports club from the city of Niterói in the state of Rio de Janeiro in Brazil. The club was founded on 12 October 1917 by local merchants. The club always has been at home in the street Alameda São Boaventura in the quarter Fonseca and moved to its current location there in 1926.

The club is best known for its association football team, which between 1937 and 1962 won a record eleven times the championship of Niterói and in the years 1959, 1960 and 1962 three times the Campeonato Fluminense, i.e., the championship of the state of Rio the Janeiro, which then did not include the city of the same name, which as the then national capital formed as Distrito Federal a separate entity. The three state titles qualified Fonseca to participate in the Taça Brasil, a competition which served as national championship. On each of those occasions the club exited the competition after the first round. The most famous player in the history of the club is Orlando Peçanha who started his career with the youth teams of Fonseca and progressed to win the World Cups of 1958 and 1962 with Brasil.

The club also had some local success in table tennis and cycling in the 1950s and indoor football in the 1990s. These days the club is still active in ballroom dancing, swimming, hydro-gymnastics, jiu jitsu and capoira, a martial arts form that originated in the north-east of Brazil.

== Honours ==
=== State ===
- Campeonato Fluminense
  - Winners (3): 1959, 1960, 1962
- Campeonato Fluminense - 2ª Divisão
  - Winners (2): 1923, 1924

=== City ===
- Campeonato Niteroiense de Futebol
  - Winners (11): 1937, 1939, 1950, 1953, 1954, 1955, 1957, 1959, 1960, 1961, 1962
- Torneio Início de Niterói
  - Winners (4): 1954, 1958, 1959, 1961
