= Esporte Clube Metropol =

Metropol
- Full name: Esporte Clube Metropol
- Nickname: Carneiros
- Founded: November 15, 1945
- Dissolved: 1969
- Ground: Parque Euvaldo Loudi, Criciúma, Brazil
- Capacity: 20,000
| Home colours | Away colours |

Esporte Clube Metropol, commonly known as Metropol, were a Brazilian football team from Criciúma, Santa Catarina state. They won the Campeonato Catarinense, the main competition of association football for the state of Santa Catarina, five times.

== History ==
Esporte Clube Metropol were founded on January 20, 1960. They won the state championship in 1960, 1961, 1962, 1967 and 1969. Metropol closed their professional football department in 1969, shortly after winning the state championship, due to a disagreement with the Santa Catarina State Football Federation. The club then started to compete again in amateur competitions.

== Stadium ==
Metropol played their home games at Estádio Euvaldo Loudi. The stadium had a maximum capacity of 20,000 people.

== Honours ==
=== Official tournaments ===
State
| Competitions | Titles | Seasons |
|---|---|---|
| Campeonato Catarinense | 5 | 1960, 1961, 1962, 1967, 1969 |

=== Others tournaments ===
==== State Regional ====
- Torneio da LARM (3): 1960, 1961, 1963
- Torneio Início da LARM (2): 1962, 1963

==== City ====
- Taça Santa Bárbara (1): 1962

=== Runners-up ===
- Campeonato Catarinense (1): 1965

=== Awards ===
- Fita Azul (1): 1962

Fita Azul do Futebol Brasileiro (Brazilian Football Blue Ribbon) was an award given for the club which succeeds in an excursion out of the country.
