= Clube do Remo =

Brazilian association football club based in Belém, Pará

Remo
- Full name: Clube do Remo
- Nicknames: Leão Azul (Blue Lion); O Mais Querido (The Most Beloved); Filho da Glória e do Triunfo (Son of Glory and Triumph); Clube de Periçá (Periçá's Club); Rei da Amazônia (King of the Amazon)
- Founded: 5 February 1905; 121 years ago
- Ground: Baenão; Mangueirão
- Capacity: 14,032; 55,000
- President: Glauber Gonçalves
- Head coach: Thiago Carpini
- League: Campeonato Brasileiro Série A Campeonato Paraense
- 2025 2025: Série B, 4th of 20 (promoted); Paraense, 1st of 12 (champions)
- Website: clubedoremo.com.br
Home colors	Away colors	Third colors

Clube do Remo, commonly referred to as Remo, is a Brazilian professional club based in Belém, Pará, founded on 5 February 1905. It competes in the Campeonato Brasileiro Série A, the top tier of Brazilian football, as well as in the Campeonato Paraense, the top flight of the Pará state football league.

== History ==
Clube do Remo was founded on 5 February 1905, as Grupo do Remo. The founders, before founding Remo, had abandoned Sport Club do Pará. On 14 February 1908, Remo was closed by the club's general assembly. On 29 March 1908, Remo's partners and Sport Club do Pará made a deal, and Remo was officially extinct in 1908. On 15 August 1911, Remo was reorganized following the initiative of Antonico Silva, Cândido Jucá, Carl Schumann, Elzaman Magalhães, Geraldo Motta, Jayme Lima, Norton Corllet, Oscar Saltão, Otto Bartels and Palmério Pinto.

In 1950, Remo held a tour to Venezuela at the invitation of the football federation of the country to compete in the Caracas International Tournament, which, according to some publications, may have been the precursor of the Little World Cup, played between the 1950s and 1960s. The team held five matches, getting four wins (La Salle, Unión, Military School and Deportivo Italia) and only one loss to Loyola, considering the higher strength of the Venezuelan football at the time. Remo is still seeking official recognition of the title by the CONMEBOL. If accepted, will be the first international title in club history.

Remo also had great campaigns on the national scene. Its most outstanding campaigns were the 7th place obtained in the Campeonato Brasileiro Série A in 1993 and the semifinals in the Copa do Brasil in 1991 – these results represent the best performance of a north team in the history of both competitions.

In 2000, they finished 3rd in the Copa João Havelange's Yellow Module, winning a spot in the final phase of the championship. They were eliminated in the Round of 16 by Sport.

In 2005, the club won the Campeonato Brasileiro Série C. This was the club's first national title. The club also has one title of the Copa Verde, three of the Torneio do Norte and one Torneio Norte-Nordeste, as well as being one of the largest state winners.

== Symbols ==
=== Crest ===
The first Remo's emblem consisted of a navy blue rectangle, with the center a white anchor, in obliquely, circulated by thirteen stars of the same color. After the reorganization of 1911, the anchor gave way to a format shield similar to a buoy lifeguard, crossed by a pair of oars. At the top was the description "Grupo do Remo" and the environment, the initials "GR" intertwined.

In 1914, the college is renamed Clube do Remo. With this change, the shield also is renewed. The circular uniformity of the previous badge is maintained by adding the typical symmetrical side cut-outs of British heraldry - heritage of some founders of the club with academic training in Europe, especially in England. The acronym GR gives way to the CR.

Over the years, the shield has undergone some changes, without changing style. The last change occurred in 2013, seeking to rescue the origins of the club and to combine the concept of modernity. According to the Brand Manual, the Bluean shield now has a finish on the sidelines and superior to characterize volume and three-dimensionality, in addition to the reversal of the stars color according to the degree of importance of each title - five white representing the five state titles consecutive and golden, representing the national title of Campeonato Brasileiro Série C in 2005.

=== Anthem ===
The anthem of Clube do Remo originated from an adaptation by the poet Antônio Tavernard of a carnival march composed by Emílio Albim for the Cadetes Azulinos bloco, created in 1933 and formed by athletes, members, officials and supporters who paraded through the streets of Belém towards Republic Square. Tavernard replaced around thirty words from the march to create the “Hymn of the Azulinos Athletes”, which was first published in the newspaper O Estado do Pará on 4 November 1941.

== Colours ==
Raul Engelhard, one of the founders of Grupo do Remo on 5 February 1905, had previously studied in England. A supporter of the Rowing Club — and also an enthusiast of rowing competitions — he proposed that Remo’s official colour should match that of Rowing: the United Kingdom’s imperial blue. In 1911, Grupo do Remo (originally a regatta club) became Clube do Remo, and two years later the team contested its first Campeonato Paraense, wearing navy blue and white horizontally striped shirts.

=== Traditional home kit ===
Since its inception, the club has adopted navy blue and white as its official colours. The primary kits of all variations feature navy blue as the dominant shade, with the order reversed in the secondary strips. The shirt worn in the club’s first football match was designed with horizontal stripes.

=== Kit suppliers ===
Period	Kit supplier
1913–1976	None
1977–1989	Adidas
1990–1993	Campeã
1994–1995	Amddma
1996	Rhumell
1997–2000	Penalty
2001–2004	Topper
2005–2007	Finta
2007–2008	Kanxa
2008–2009	Champs
2010–2011	Penalty
2012–2016	Umbro
2016–2019	Topper
2020–2021	Kappa
2021–present	Volt Sport

== Supporters ==
In the 1970s, the prestigious magazine Revista Placar, elected the best supported clubs in each Brazilian state and the Leão Azul again confirmed its supremacy in Pará. In the 90s contributed further to the increase in Clube do Remo fans, due to the large made the club in this period: eight state titles, large national campaigns and supremacy in the Classic King of the Amazon (the taboo history of 33 games without losing for the biggest rival).

However, from the 2000s, Clube do Remo began to get into a turbulent period in its history with successive failures in national competitions like the relegation from the Série C in 2005 and being relegated to the point where they did not play a national championship three times.

Despite the difficulties, the fans, contrary to expectations, only increased. Proof of this was the IBOPE study which ranked Remo as the largest club in Northern Brazil and 16th in the ranking of the largest supported clubs of the country, besides being the fastest growing among fans in the range of 10 to 15 years, surpassing clubs like Botafogo, Fluminense and Coritiba. Remo has most of its fans in Belém, ranging from 1 million to 2 million.

=== Attendances ===
The average home attendance of Remo per league season:

Season	Played	Total attendance	Average attendance
2025	19	435,589	22,926

== Rivalries ==
Remo's biggest rival is Paysandu, with whom it plays the Clássico Rei da Amazônia (Amazon King derby) or Re-Pa, the largest in the northern region of Brazil. The first game took place on 14 June 1914, with Remo winning 2–1. The Periçá's Club has the most wins in the derby. Between 1993 and 1997, Remo applied a historical taboo on the rival. There were 33 matches (21 wins and 12 draws) in 4 years, 5 months and 24 days. In 2016, the derby was declared intangible cultural heritage of the Pará state, being qualified as a cultural expression of the people of Pará. To this day, more than 760 matches were played between both clubs; which makes this rivalry the football derby with most games played in history, beating even the oldest derbies from Europe.

Also, a further minor rivalry exists between Remo and Tuna Luso. The first match happened on 15 November 1931, a friendly that ended 0–0.

== Stadiums ==
Remo's stadium is Evandro Almeida (Baenão), which has a maximum capacity of 17,250 people. The stadium is named after Evandro Almeida, who was a Remo's football player and employee. The nickname Baenão is a reference to the place where the stadium is located, called Travessa Antônio Baena.

Mangueirão is used for the derbies against Paysandu and also for Remo big matches, where the record attendance for Remo occurred on 5 November 2000, in a Copa João Havelange Group Yellow semifinal match attended by 55,000 fans against Paraná.

== Players ==
=== First team squad ===
As of 10 November 2026

Note: Flags indicate national team as defined under FIFA eligibility rules; some limited exceptions apply. Players may hold more than one non-FIFA nationality.

No.	Pos.	Nation	Player
1	GK	BRA	Alexandre
2	DF	BRA	João Lucas (on loan from Grêmio)
4	DF	BRA	Matheus Felipe
5	DF	BRA	Léo Andrade
6	DF	BRA	Marlon
7	FW	BRA	Jajá
8	MF	BRA	Patrick (on loan from Santos)
9	FW	BRA	Gabriel Poveda (on loan from Primavera)
10	MF	BRA	Jáderson
13	DF	BRA	Marllon (captain)
14	MF	ARG	Leonel Picco
15	MF	BRA	Vitor Bueno
18	DF	CMR	Duplexe Tchamba
19	FW	BRA	Gabriel Taliari
21	FW	PAR	Antonio Galeano

No.	Pos.	Nation	Player
22	FW	BRA	Yago Pikachu
26	MF	BRA	David Braga
27	DF	BRA	Zé Ivaldo (on loan from Santos)
28	MF	BRA	Zé Welison
30	GK	BRA	João Victor
35	MF	BRA	Edson Fernando (on loan from Karpaty Lviv)
39	FW	BRA	Eduardo Melo
55	MF	BRA	Zé Ricardo
61	FW	BRA	Tico
77	DF	BRA	Mayk
79	DF	BRA	Marcelinho
88	GK	BRA	Marcelo Rangel
94	GK	BRA	Ygor Vinhas
97	GK	BRA	Ivan
—	DF	BRA	Matheus Alexandre (on loan from Sport)

=== Youth team ===
Note: Flags indicate national team as defined under FIFA eligibility rules; some limited exceptions apply. Players may hold more than one non-FIFA nationality.

No.	Pos.	Nation	Player
20	FW	COL	Andrés González (on loan from Amazônia Independente)
62	MF	BRA	Rafael

No.	Pos.	Nation	Player
64	FW	BRA	Paulo Henrique
65	MF	BRA	Miguel

==== Out on loan ====
Note: Flags indicate national team as defined under FIFA eligibility rules; some limited exceptions apply. Players may hold more than one non-FIFA nationality.

No.	Pos.	Nation	Player
—	DF	ARG	Iván Alvariño (at Novorizontino until 30 November 2026)
—	DF	BRA	Kadu (at Botafogo until 31 December 2026)
—	MF	BRA	Dodô (at Vila Nova until 30 November 2026)

No.	Pos.	Nation	Player
—	MF	BRA	Guty (at Brasil de Pelotas until 30 November 2026)
—	FW	BRA	Marrony (at Atlético Goianiense until 30 November 2026)

== Honours ==
Remo is one of the most successful clubs in Northern Brazil, having won a total of 55 titles.

=== Official tournaments ===
National
Competitions	Titles	Seasons
Campeonato Brasileiro Série C	1	2005
Regional
Competitions	Titles	Seasons
Copa Verde	1	2021
Torneio Norte-Nordeste	1^{s}	1971
Torneio do Norte	3	1968, 1969, 1971
State
Competitions	Titles	Seasons
Campeonato Paraense	48	1913, 1914, 1915, 1916, 1917, 1918, 1919, 1924, 1925, 1926, 1930, 1933, 1936, 1940, 1949, 1950, 1952, 1953, 1954, 1960, 1964, 1968, 1973, 1974, 1975, 1977, 1978, 1979, 1986, 1989, 1990, 1991, 1993, 1994, 1995, 1996, 1997, 1999, 2003, 2004, 2007, 2008, 2014, 2015, 2018, 2019, 2022, 2025
Super Copa Grão-Pará	1^{s}	2026

- record
- ^{s} shared record

=== Others tournaments ===
==== International ====
- Caracas International Tournament (1): 1950
- Belém International Quadrangular Tournament (1): 1954
- Paramaribo International Tournament (2): 1984, 1999

==== National ====
- Torneio Quadrangular de Salvador (1): 1967-I

==== State ====
- Taça Cidade de Belém (2): 2004, 2014
- Taça Estado do Pará (5): 2004, 2007, 2008, 2012, 2015
- Torneio Início do Pará (14): 1920, 1921, 1922, 1923, 1925, 1928, 1934, 1939, 1945, 1952, 1955, 1956, 1959, 1964

=== Runners-up ===
- Campeonato Brasileiro Série B (2): 1971, 1984
- Campeonato Brasileiro Série C (1): 2020
- Copa Verde (2): 2015, 2020
- Copa Norte (1): 1997
- Torneio Norte-Nordeste (2): 1968, 1969
- Campeonato Paraense (36): 1920, 1921, 1922, 1927, 1939, 1944, 1947, 1951, 1956, 1957, 1958, 1959, 1961, 1965, 1966, 1967, 1969, 1971, 1976, 1980, 1981, 1982, 1983, 1985, 1987, 1988, 1992, 1998, 2001, 2005, 2012, 2017, 2020, 2023, 2024, 2026

== See also ==
- Clube do Remo (women)
