= Torneio Norte-Nordeste =

- Founded: 1968
- Abolished: 1970
- Region: Brazil's North and Northeast
- Most championships: Ceará; Fortaleza (Pernambuco) Sport (1 title each)

The Torneio Norte-Nordeste (English: North-Northeast Tournament) was a football competition held between 1968 and 1970. In 1968 and 1969, it was played exclusively by North Tournament champion and the Northeast Tournament. In 1970, the tournament was played on a quadrangular basis involving four clubs.

== History ==
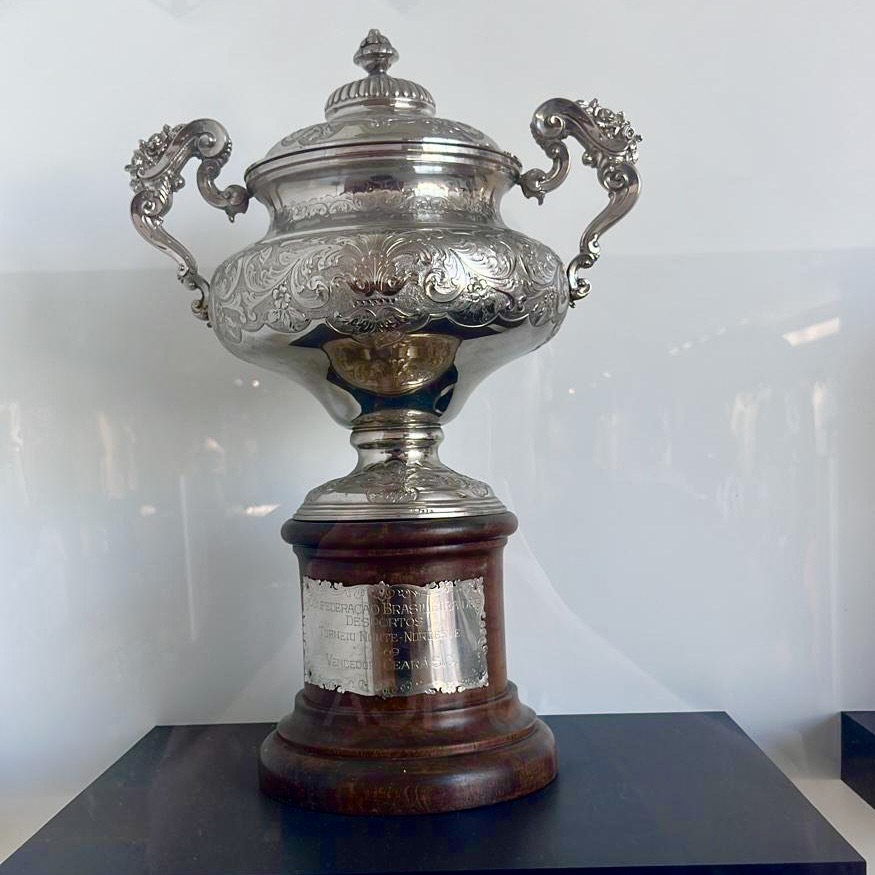
The trophy given in the 1969 edition, won by Ceará.

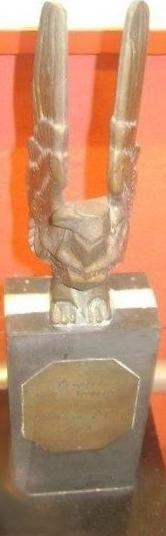
The trophy given in the 1970 edition, won by Fortaleza.

After big Rio de Janeiro and São Paulo teams invited other big teams from Minas Gerais, Rio Grande do Sul and Paraná to play in a new expanded version of the Torneio Rio-São Paulo called Torneio Roberto Gomes Pedrosa, in 1967, the Taça Brasil started to become irrelevant with Robertão's success and it caught the attention of the Brazilian Sports Confederation (CBD).

So for the 1968 season CBD launched a new plan for the future of brazilian football: they took control of Robertão, which was renamed to "Taça de Prata", renamed Taça Brasil to "Torneio dos Campeões Estaduais" and created two new tournaments called Torneio Norte-Nordeste and Torneio Centro-Sul. The idea was for each region to have its champion that would play in the Torneio dos Campeões, fight for the title of "Champions of Brazil" and a berth in the 1970 Copa Libertadores. This regional division was also due to economic limitations in organizing an nation-wide competition at the time.

The first season of the Norte-Nordeste was won by Sport Recife against Remo in the final. Prior to the final both teams had won their regional zones called Torneio do Norte and Torneio do Nordeste, which also counted as official titles according to the CBD Annual Report of that year. The same format repeated in 1969, where this time Ceará won against Remo in a best of three. In 1970, the finalists of the regional zones qualified for a quadrangular where Fortaleza were champions ahead of Sport, Remo and Fast Clube.

In 1971, CBD created the Campeonato Nacional de Clubes and integrated the participants from Norte-Nordeste and Taça de Prata into the new tournament, thereby bringing the history of both competitions to an end.

== Results ==
Year	Winner	Score	Runner-up	Comments
1968	(Pernambuco) Sport	3–1; 2–1	(Pará) Remo	
1969	Ceará	1–2; 3−2; 3–0	(Pará) Remo	Best of three
1970	(Ceará) Fortaleza	—	(Pernambuco) Sport	Quadrangular
