= Jajá (footballer, born 1974) =

Brazilian footballer

Personal information
- Full name: Jair Xavier de Brito
- Date of birth: 7 September 1974 (age 52)
- Place of birth: Salvador, Brazil
- Height: 1.76 m (5 ft 9 in)
- Position: Winger

Youth career
- 1993: Cruzeiro
- 1993–1996: Botafogo-SP

Senior career*
Years	Team	Apps	(Gls)
1995–1997	Botafogo-SP		
1996	→ Juventus-SP (loan)		
1997	→ Coritiba (loan)		
1997–1998	Veracruz		
1999	Guarani		
1999	Santo André		
1999–2000	Caxias		
2000	Bahia		
2000–2001	Botafogo-SP		
2001–2002	Santo André		
2002	Paysandu		
2002	Ceará		
2003	Brasiliense		
2004	América Mineiro		
2004–2005	Caxias		
2005	→ Glória (loan)		
2006	Vila Nova		
2006	Caxias		
2007	Sampaio Corrêa		
- * Club domestic league appearances and goals

Jair Xavier de Brito (born 7 September 1974), simply known as Jajá, is a Brazilian former professional footballer who played as winger.

== Career ==
Having spent time in Cruzeiro's youth sectors, Jajá began his professional career with Botafogo-SP. After standing out in the 1995 Copa SP de Futebol Jr., he was incorporated into the professionals. He was loaned to Juventus-SP and Coritiba, in addition to having a spell in Mexican football at Veracruz. In 2000, in a new spell at Botafogo-SP, he was one of the highlights of the team that achieved promotion to Série A1 of the Campeonato Paulista.

In August 2002, while playing for Paysandu, the player was attacked with an elbow by defender Horacio Ameli in a match against São Paulo. Jajá also stood out playing for Caxias, a club for which he was state champion in 2000 and accumulated three spells, the last being in 2005.

== Personal life ==
Jajá is the father of two other football players also called by the nickname Jajá: Jair Diego and Jair Vinícius. He is currently a businessman and lives in the city of Catanduva.

== Honours ==
Caxias

- Campeonato Gaúcho: 2000

Paysandu

- Campeonato Paraense: 2002
- Copa Norte: 2002
- Copa dos Campeões: 2002
