= Marquinhos (footballer, born 1981) =

Brazilian footballer

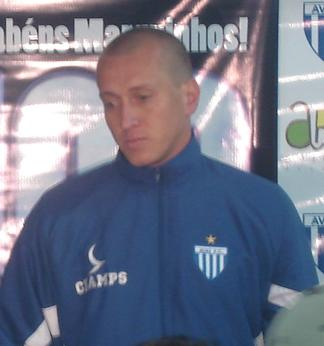
- Marquinhos in 2008

Personal information
- Full name: Marcos Vicente dos Santos
- Date of birth: 29 September 1981 (age 45)
- Place of birth: Biguaçu, Brazil
- Height: 1.81 m (5 ft 11 in)
- Position: Attacking midfielder

Team information
- Current team: Avaí (interim)

Youth career
- Biguaçu
- 1997–1998: Avaí

Senior career*
Years	Team	Apps	(Gls)
1999	Avaí	35	(6)
2000	Inter de Limeira	4	(0)
2000–2005	Bayer Leverkusen II	31	(6)
2002	→ Paraná (loan)	6	(1)
2002	→ Flamengo (loan)	6	(0)
2003	→ Paraná (loan)	49	(16)
2004	→ São Paulo (loan)	17	(3)
2005	→ Coritiba (loan)	30	(5)
2006	Fortaleza	0	(0)
2006–2007	Iraty	0	(0)
2006	→ Avaí (loan)	31	(3)
2007	→ Santa Cruz (loan)	21	(5)
2007	→ Atlético Mineiro (loan)	12	(1)
2008–2009	Avaí	90	(29)
2010–2011	Santos	46	(6)
2011	→ Avaí (loan)	17	(4)
2011–2013	Grêmio	77	(9)
2013–2019	Avaí	195	(45)
Total		667	(139)

Managerial career
- 2024: Avaí (interim)
- 2025: Avaí (interim)
- 2026–: Avaí (interim)
- * Club domestic league appearances and goals

Marcos Vicente dos Santos (born 29 September 1981), commonly known as Marquinhos, is a Brazilian former professional footballer who played as an attacking midfielder. He is the current interim head coach of Avaí.

His brother Gustavo Santos is also a footballer.

== Career statistics ==
Appearances and goals by club, season and competition
Club	Season	League			State League		Cup		Continental		Other		Total	
Club	Season	Division	Apps	Goals	Apps	Goals	Apps	Goals	Apps	Goals	Apps	Goals	Apps	Goals
Avaí	1999	Série B	20	2	15	4	0	0	—		—		35	6
Inter de Limeira	2000	Copa João Havelange	0	0	4	0	—		—		—		4	0
Bayer Leverkusen II	2000–01	Oberliga Nordrhein	17	2	—		1	1	—		—		18	3
Bayer Leverkusen II	2001–02	Regionalliga Nord	14	4	—		0	0	—		—		14	4
Bayer Leverkusen II	Total		31	6	—		1	1	—		—		32	7
Paraná (loan)	2002	Série A	0	0	6	1	6	4	—		10 (Note: Appearance(s) in Copa Sul-Minas)	2	22	7
Flamengo (loan)	2002	Série A	6	0	—		—		—		4 (Note: Appearance(s) in Copa dos Campeões)	0	10	0
Paraná (loan)	2003	Série A	41	15	8	1	—		—		—		49	16
São Paulo (loan)	2004	Série A	7	1	10	2	—		10 (Note: Appearance(s) in Copa Libertadores)	2	—		27	5
Coritiba (loan)	2005	Série A	15	3	15	2	3	1	—		—		33	6
Fortaleza	2006	Série A	0	0	—		—		—		—		0	0
Avaí	2006	Série B	31	3	—		—		—		—		31	3
Santa Cruz	2007	Série B	12	3	9	2	0	0	—		—		21	5
Atlético Mineiro	2007	Série A	12	1	—		—		—		—		12	1
Avaí	2008	Série B	32	8	18	9	0	0	—		—		50	17
Avaí	2009	Série A	31	8	19	4	0	0	—		—		50	12
Avaí	Total		63	16	27	13	0	0	—		—		100	29
Santos	2010	Série A	28	1	18	5	8	3	2 (Note: Appearance(s) in Copa Sudamericana)	0	—		56	9
Avaí (loan)	2011	Série A	1	0	16	4	6	0	—		—		23	4
Grêmio	2011	Série A	31	5	—		—		—		—		31	5
Grêmio	2012	Série A	28	3	18	1	5	0	5	0	—		56	4
Grêmio	Total		59	8	18	1	5	0	5	0	—		87	9
Avaí	2013	Série B	30	11	19	5	2	1	—		—		51	17
Avaí	2014	Série B	32	8	14	3	5	2	—		—		51	13
Avaí	2015	Série A	14	2	8	4	3	0	—		—		25	6
Avaí	2016	Série B	14	3	0	0	0	0	—		—		14	3
Avaí	2017	Série A	23	4	15	2	1	0	—		1 (Note: Appearance(s) in Primeira Liga)	0	40	6
Avaí	2018	Série B	14	1	10	2	4	1	—		—		28	4
Avaí	2019	Série B	0	0	2	0	0	0	—		—		2	0
Avaí	Total		127	29	68	16	15	4	—		1	0	211	49
Career total			453	88	214	51	44	13	17	2	15	2	753	156

== Honours ==
Avaí

- Campeonato Catarinense: 2009, 2019

Santos

- Campeonato Paulista: 2010
- Copa do Brasil: 2010

Individual

- Campeonato Catarinense Best midfielder: 2008, 2009, 2013
- Campeonato Catarinense Best player: 2009, 2013
