= Vandick =

Brazilian footballer

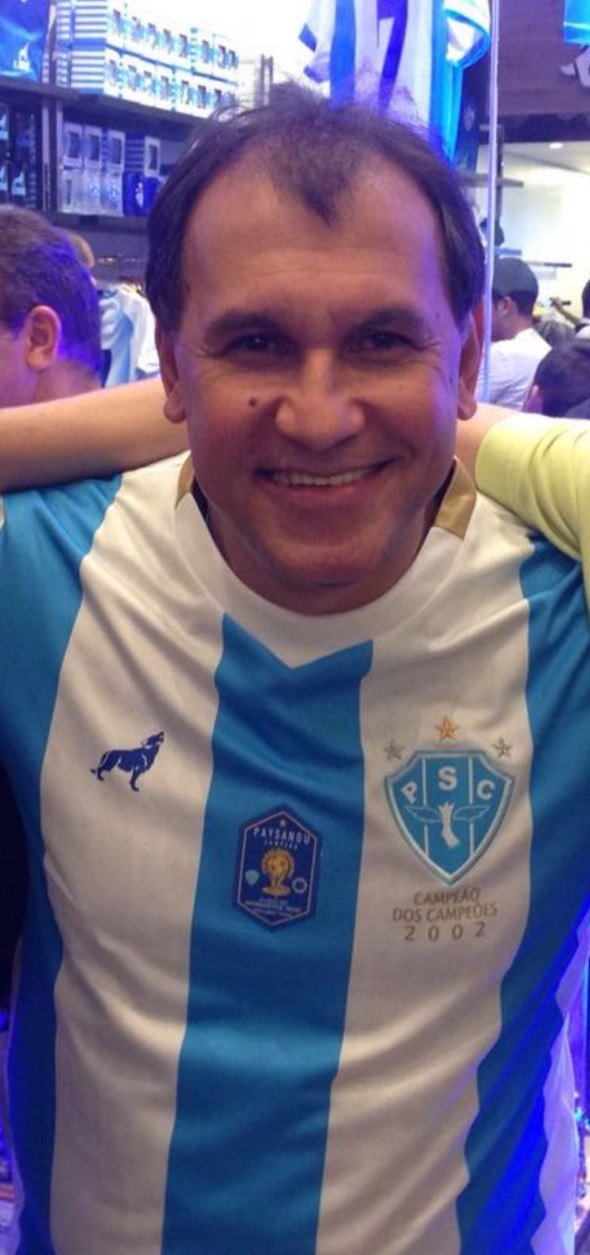

Personal information
- Full name: Vandick José de Oliveira Lima
- Date of birth: 7 April 1965 (age 61)
- Place of birth: Conceição do Coité, Brazil
- Height: 1.82 m (6 ft 0 in)
- Position: Forward

Youth career
- –1984: Catuense

Senior career*
Years	Team	Apps	(Gls)
1984–1987	Catuense		
1987–1988	Flamengo	6	(0)
1989	Catuense		
1990–1991	Joinville		
1991–1992	Bahia		
1993	America-RJ		
1993–1994	Linhares		
1994	Grêmio Maringá		
1995–1996	Catuense		
1996–1999	Veranópolis		
2000	Esportivo		
2000	Juventude		
2001	Esportivo		
2001–2003	Paysandu		
- * Club domestic league appearances and goals as of 2 November 2023

Vandick José de Oliveira Lima (born 7 April 1965), simply known as Vandick, is a Brazilian former professional footballer who played as a forward.

== Career ==
Revealed by Catuense, Vandick played for several Brazilian football clubs, most notably Flamengo. However, it was at his last club, Paysandu, where he made history by scoring 3 goals in the final of the 2002 Copa dos Campeões against Cruzeiro EC.

== Personal life ==
In 2004 and 2008 he was elected councilor in the city of Belém. In 2012 he was elected president of Paysandu SC.

== Honours ==
Flamengo

- Copa União: 1987

Paysandu

- Copa dos Campeões: 2002
- Copa Norte: 2002

Individual

- 1987 Campeonato Baiano top scorer: 18 goals
- 1989 Campeonato Baiano top scorer: 13 goals

Playing for Catuense
