= 2002 Torneio Rio-São Paulo =

Torneio Rio-São Paulo
- Season: 2002
- Champions: Corinthians (5th title)
- Relegated: America (RJ), Guarani (SP)
- Matches: 126
- Goals: 469 (3.72 per match)
- Top goalscorer: França (São Paulo) – 19 goals
- Biggest home win: São Paulo 7–0 Bangu (Feb 17)
- Biggest away win: America 0–8 Fluminense (Jan 27)

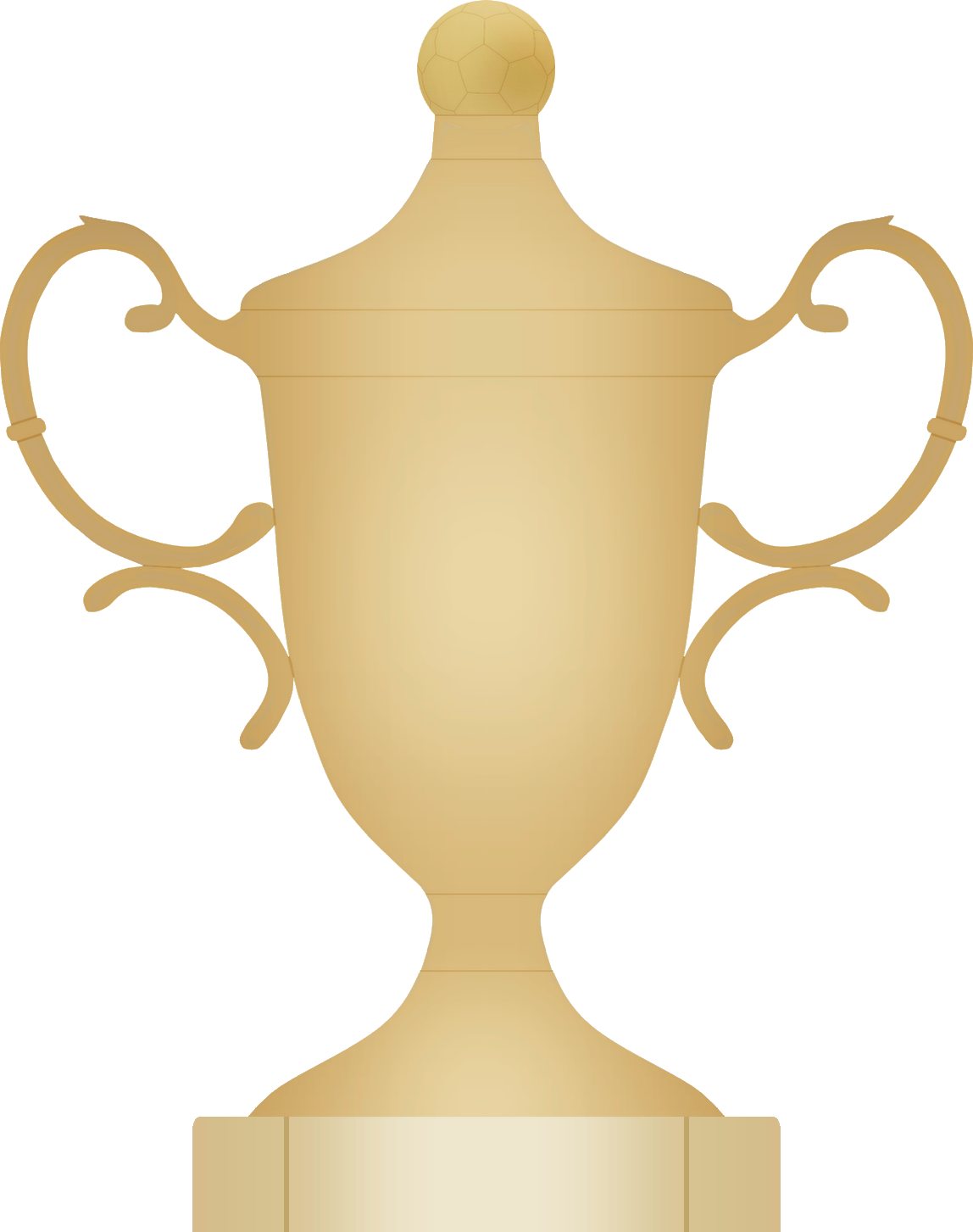
Trophy for the 2002 Rio-São Paulo Tournament

The 2002 Torneio Rio São Paulo was the 26th and the last edition disputed of the Torneio Rio-São Paulo. It was the edition with the most participants involved, and it was expected to be at the top of the pyramid of Campeonato Paulista and Campeonato Carioca.

== Participants ==
Team	City	Ground	Nº participations	Best result
America	(Rio de Janeiro (state)) Rio de Janeiro	Edson Passos	14	5th (1962)
Americano	(Rio de Janeiro (state)) Campos dos Goytacazes	Godofredo Cruz	1	Debut
Bangu	(Rio de Janeiro (state)) Rio de Janeiro	Moça Bonita	8	3rd (1951)
Botafogo	(Rio de Janeiro (state)) Rio de Janeiro	Caio Martins	23	Champions: 1962, 1964 (shared), 1966 (shared), 1998
Corinthians	(São Paulo (state)) São Paulo	Rotative	26	Champions: 1950, 1953, 1954, 1966 (shared)
Jundiaí	(São Paulo (state)) Jundiaí	Jayme Cintra	1	Debut
Flamengo	(Rio de Janeiro (state)) Rio de Janeiro	Maracanã	25	Champions: 1961
Fluminense	(Rio de Janeiro (state)) Rio de Janeiro	Maracanã	25	Champions: 1957, 1960
Guarani	(São Paulo (state)) Campinas	Brinco de Ouro	1	Debut
Palmeiras	(São Paulo (state)) São Paulo	Parque Antártica	26	Champions: 1933, 1951, 1965, 1993, 2000
Ponte Preta	(São Paulo (state)) Campinas	Moisés Lucarelli	1	Debut
Portuguesa	(São Paulo (state)) São Paulo	Canindé	21	Champions: 1952, 1955
Santos	(São Paulo (state)) Santos	Vila Belmiro	22	Champions: 1959, 1963, 1964 (shared), 1966 (shared), 1997
São Caetano	(São Paulo (state)) São Caetano do Sul	Anacleto Campanella	1	Debut
São Paulo	(São Paulo (state)) São Paulo	Morumbi	25	Champions: 2001
Vasco da Gama	(Rio de Janeiro (state)) Rio de Janeiro	São Januário	26	Champions: 1958, 1966 (shared), 1999

Note: Jundiaí is the currently Paulista Futebol Clube. The name Jundiaí FC was used during the Torneio-Rio São Paulo dispute after the end of the partnership with Etti Alimentos.

== Format ==
The first stage was disputed in a single round-robin format. The best four placed clubs advanced to the semifinals and qualified for the 2002 Copa dos Campeões edition. 5th and 6th placed clubs also qualified to the Copa dos Campeões. The worst team from São Paulo was relegated to the 2003 Campeonato Paulista edition and the worst team from Rio de Janeiro was relegated to the 2003 Campeonato Carioca edition.

In the semifinals stage the first placed team into the previous stage played against the fourth placed team, while the second and third best placed teams played between each other. The winners advanced to the finals.

== Tournament ==
Following is the summary of the 2002 Torneio Rio-São Paulo tournament:

=== First stage ===
Pos	Team	Pld	W	D	L	GF	GA	GD	Pts	Qualification
1	(São Paulo (state)) Corinthians	15	9	4	2	30	14	+16	31	Qualified to semifinals and to 2002 Copa dos Campeões
2	(São Paulo (state)) Palmeiras	15	9	4	2	34	23	+11	31	Qualified to semifinals and to 2002 Copa dos Campeões
3	(São Paulo (state)) São Paulo	15	8	2	5	47	31	+16	26	Qualified to semifinals and to 2002 Copa dos Campeões
4	(São Paulo (state)) São Caetano	15	8	1	6	23	18	+5	25	Qualified to semifinals and to 2002 Copa dos Campeões
5	(Rio de Janeiro (state)) Fluminense	15	7	3	5	33	23	+10	24	Qualified to 2002 Copa dos Campeões
6	(Rio de Janeiro (state)) Vasco da Gama	15	6	6	3	32	23	+9	24	Qualified to 2002 Copa dos Campeões
7	(Rio de Janeiro (state)) Botafogo	15	6	5	4	32	25	+7	23	
8	(São Paulo (state)) Jundiaí	15	6	5	4	32	27	+5	23	
9	(São Paulo (state)) Santos	15	6	5	4	25	20	+5	23	
10	(São Paulo (state)) Portuguesa	15	6	2	7	27	37	−10	20	
11	(São Paulo (state)) Ponte Preta	15	5	5	5	29	28	+1	20	
12	(São Paulo (state)) Guarani (R)	15	5	5	5	19	19	0	20	Relegated to 2003 Campeonato Paulista
13	(Rio de Janeiro (state)) Flamengo	15	4	3	8	34	38	−4	15	
14	(Rio de Janeiro (state)) Americano	15	3	2	10	20	37	−17	11	
15	(Rio de Janeiro (state)) Bangu	15	1	5	9	18	38	−20	8	
16	(Rio de Janeiro (state)) America (R)	15	2	1	12	15	49	−34	7	Relegated to 2003 Campeonato Carioca

Source: RSSSF
Rules for classification: 1) points; 2) wins; 3) goal difference; 4) goals for; 5) less red cards; 6) less yellow cards.
(R) Relegated

=== Semifinals ===
Team 1	Agg.	Team 2	1st leg	2nd leg
Corinthians	4–2	São Caetano	1–1	3–1
Palmeiras	3–3	São Paulo	1–1	2–2

Note: São Paulo advanced due to the best fair play criteria.

=== Finals ===
5 May 2002

São Paulo	2–3	Corinthians
Adriano 16' (pen.); Belletti 69'		Deivid 47'; Leandro 53'; Gil 64'

Morumbi, São Paulo
Attendance: 34,514
Referee: Edílson Pereira de Carvalho

12 May 2002

Corinthians	1–1	São Paulo
Rogério 78'		Reinaldo 2'

Morumbi, São Paulo
Attendance: 53,414
Referee: Paulo César de Oliveira

== Top scorers ==
Rank	Player	Club	Goals
1	França	São Paulo	19
2	Dodô	Botafogo	17
3	Romário	Vasco da Gama	13
3	Washington	Ponte Preta	13
5	Ricardo Oliveira	Portuguesa	12

== Disestablishing of Torneio Rio São Paulo ==
As from the 2003 season the Campeonato Brasileiro Série A started to be played in a double round-robin format, the lack of available dates caused the end of the Torneio Rio São Paulo, as well as other regional tournaments such as the Copa Sul-Minas and the Copa do Nordeste (later re-established).

The clubs, however, returned to compete normally in the state championships, this being the first competition to be played in the Brazilian football scheduling.
