= Milagres =

Milagres is Portuguese for 'miracles' and may refer to:

- Milagres, Bahia, a municipality in the Brazilian state of Bahia
- Milagres, Ceará, a municipality in the Brazilian state of Ceará
- Milagres, Leiria, a populated locality in Leiria, Portugal
- Milagres (band)
- Milagres (footballer), Marco Antônio Gonçalves Milagres (born 1966), Brazilian former footballer and manager
- Milagres Gonsalves
- Milagres Church (disambiguation)
