= Lecheva =

Brazilian footballer

Personal information
- Full name: Ricardo Mendes Nascimento
- Date of birth: 3 April 1974 (age 52)
- Place of birth: Mogi das Cruzes, Brazil
- Height: 1.76 m (5 ft 9 in)
- Position: Midfielder

Team information
- Current team: Amazonas (football coordinator)

Youth career
- União Mogi

Senior career*
| Years | Team | Apps | (Gls) |
| 1993–1997 | União Mogi | | |
| 1998 | ECUS | | |
| 1998–2000 | Tuna Luso | | |
| 1999 | → São José-SP (loan) | | |
| 2001–2005 | Paysandu | | |
| 2005–2006 | Santa Cruz | | |
| 2007 | Paysandu | | |
| 2008 | Volta Redonda | | |
| 2009 | Paysandu | | |
| 2009 | Treze | | |
| 2009 | Santana | | |

Managerial career
- 2012–2013: Paysandu
- 2013: Tuna Luso
- 2014: Independente-PA
- 2015: São Raimundo-PA
- 2017: São Raimundo-PA
- 2017: Mogi Mirim
- 2017: Tapajós
- 2018: Castanhal
- 2018: Nacional-AM
- 2018: Izabelense
- 2019: Ypiranga-AP
- 2019–2020: Amazonas
- 2020: Fast Clube
- 2021: Amazonas
- 2021: Fast Clube
- 2026: Amazonas (interim)
- * Club domestic league appearances and goals

Ricardo Mendes Nascimento (born 3 April 1974), commonly known as Lecheva, is a Brazilian football coach and former player who played as a midfielder. He is the current football coordinator of Amazonas.

== Playing career ==
Born in Mogi das Cruzes, he began his career at União Mogi, in addition to having played for ECUS and São José EC. He was successful in Pará football, first at Tuna Luso and mainly at Paysandu, where he became one of the great names in the club's history.

== Managerial career ==
He began his coaching career at Paysandu itself, becoming state champion in 2013. He managed several other clubs in the northern region of the country, doing a great job at Amazonas FC, being appointed as one of those responsible for structuring the club. He worked at Paysandu SC as football coordinator in 2022-2023. In April 2024, Lecheva went to Amazonas FC to repeat his role as football director.

== Honours ==
=== Player ===
Paysandu

- Copa dos Campeões: 2002
- Copa Norte: 2002
- Campeonato Brasileiro Série B: 2001
- Campeonato Paraense: 2001, 2002, 2005

=== Coach ===
Paysandu

- Campeonato Paraense: 2013

Amazonas

- Campeonato Amazonense Second Division: 2019
