= 2000 Copa dos Campeões =

1st edition of a Brazilian association football competition

Tournament details
- Country: Brazil
- Dates: 22 June – 25 July 2000
- Teams: 9

Final positions
- Champions: (São Paulo (state)) Palmeiras (1st title)
- Runners-up: (Pernambuco) Sport

Tournament statistics
- Matches played: 16
- Goals scored: 45 (2.81 per match)
- Top goal scorer(s): 4 players (3 goals each)

The 2000 Copa dos Campeões was the first edition of the football competition held in Brazil. It was carried out in a neutral field in two states in the Northeast Region — Alagoas and Paraíba.

In the final, Palmeiras defeated Sport 2–1 to win their first title and a place in the group stage of the 2001 Copa Libertadores.

== Qualified teams ==
Team	Qualification
(Minas Gerais) América Mineiro	2000 Copa Sul-Minas champions
(Minas Gerais) Cruzeiro	2000 Copa Sul-Minas runners-up
(Rio de Janeiro (state)) Flamengo	2000 Campeonato Carioca champions
Goiás	2000 Copa Centro-Oeste champions
(São Paulo (state)) Palmeiras	2000 Torneio Rio-São Paulo champions
(São Paulo (state)) São Paulo	2000 Campeonato Paulista champions
(Amazonas (Brazilian state)) São Raimundo	2000 Copa Norte champions
(Pernambuco) Sport	2000 Copa Nordeste champions
(Bahia) Vitória	2000 Copa Nordeste runners-up

== Preliminary round ==
Pos	Team	Pld	W	D	L	GF	GA	GD	Pts	Qualification
1	Goiás (A)	2	1	1	0	5	2	+3	4	Advance to Knockout stage
2	(Bahia) Vitória (A)	2	0	2	0	3	3	0	2	Advance to Knockout stage
3	(Amazonas (Brazilian state)) São Raimundo	2	0	1	1	3	6	−3	1	

Source: Bola na Área
(A) Advance to a further round

== Quarter-finals ==
Team 1	Agg.	Team 2	1st leg	2nd leg
Flamengo (Rio de Janeiro (state))	4–2	Goiás	3–2	1–0
Palmeiras (São Paulo (state))	4–2	(Minas Gerais) Cruzeiro	3–1	1–1
América Mineiro (Minas Gerais)	2–4	(Pernambuco) Sport	2–1	0–3
São Paulo (São Paulo (state))	2–0	(Bahia) Vitória	0–0	2–0

== Quarter-finals ==
Team 1	Agg.	Team 2	1st leg	2nd leg
Flamengo (Rio de Janeiro (state))	2–2	(São Paulo (state)) Palmeiras	2–1	0–1
Sport (Pernambuco)	4–3	(São Paulo (state)) São Paulo	1–2	3–1

== Final ==
25 July 2000
21:45 UTC−3

Palmeiras (São Paulo (state))	2–1	(Pernambuco) Sport
Asprilla 32'; Alberto 54'	Report	Nildo 90+1'

Estádio Rei Pelé, Maceió
Attendance: 22,560
Referee: Carlos Eugênio Simon
