= Jobson (footballer, born 1974) =

Brazilian footballer

Personal information
- Full name: Jobson Kleison da Silva Costa
- Date of birth: 17 May 1974 (age 52)
- Place of birth: Belém, Brazil
- Position: Midfielder

Youth career
- –1992: Tuna Luso

Senior career*
Years	Team	Apps	(Gls)
1992–1994	Tuna Luso		
1995–1996	Paraná		
1996–1997	Atlético Paranaense		
1997	Inter de Limeira		
1997–2005	Paysandu		
2001	→ Santa Cruz (loan)		
2005	→ Ceará (loan)		
2005	Bahia		
2006	Ceará		
2007	Remo	19	(2)
2008	Castanhal		
2008	Remo	5	(0)
2009	Ananindeua		
- * Club domestic league appearances and goals as of 20 October 2023

Jobson Kleison da Silva Costa (born 17 May 1974), simply known as Jobson, is a Brazilian former professional footballer who played as a midfielder.

== Career ==
Born in Belém, Jobson began his career at Tuna Luso. However, it was at Paraná Clube where he won his first titles, in the 1995 and 1996 state championships. He returned to Pará, this time at Paysandu, to become one of the main players in the club's history, being part of the 2001 Série B victory, Copa Norte and Copa dos Campeões in 2002. He was also champion for Ceará and Remo.

== Honours ==
Paraná

- Campeonato Paranaense: 1995, 1996

Paysandu

- Campeonato Brasileiro Série B: 2001
- Copa Norte: 2002
- Copa dos Campeões: 2002
- Campeonato Paraense: 1998, 2000, 2001, 2002

Ceará

- Campeonato Cearense: 2006

Remo

- Campeonato Paraense: 2007

Individual

- 2002 Campeonato Paraense top scorer: 9 goals
