= Majestoso =

Majestoso is Spanish and Portuguese for majestic. It can refer to:

- Estádio Moisés Lucarelli, football stadium in São Paulo
- Clássico Majestoso, a football (soccer) match between Corinthians and São Paulo
- Maestoso, a musical direction
