= 2004 São Paulo FC season =

São Paulo
2004 season
- Chairman: Marcelo Portugal Gouvêa
- Manager: Cuca (until 1 September); Emerson Leão
- Campeonato Paulista: Quarter-finals
- Copa Libertadores: Semi-finals
- Copa Sudamericana: Second round
- Top goalscorer: League: Grafite (17); All: Grafite (27)
- Highest home attendance: 52,262 ( v LDU Quito in the Copa Libertadores)
- Lowest home attendance: 2,170 ( v Coritiba in the Campeonato Brasileiro)

The 2004 season was São Paulo's 75th season since club's existence. São Paulo played Campeonato Paulista, State of São Paulo league, being defeated in a single match quarterfinal by São Caetano, 0–2, at home field due advantage points in first phase. After 10 years the club return to play the continental tournament, Copa Libertadores, that were champions in 1992, 1993 and runners-up in 1994 the last participation before 2004, reached this time the semifinals where they lost to Once Caldas in away game for 1–2 after a 0–0 in Morumbi. In Campeonato Brasileiro ending the 46 rounds with a third position, but the featured unpleasant happened in 38th match against São Caetano on 27 October when the defender of adversary Serginho fell in the field near the small area of São Caetano's defence suffering a fatal cardiac arrest at 60 minutes. With announcement of his death the match was finished and the remainder was played on 3 November. In Copa Sudamericana Tricolor was eliminated by rival Santos in second stage.

== Squad ==
- Final squad

Note: Flags indicate national team as defined under FIFA eligibility rules; some limited exceptions apply. Players may hold more than one non-FIFA nationality.

No.	Pos.	Nation	Player
1	GK	BRA	Rogério Ceni
2	DF	BRA	Cicinho
3	DF	BRA	Fabão
5	DF	URU	Diego Lugano
4	DF	BRA	Rodrigo
6	DF	BRA	Júnior
16	DF	BRA	Fábio Santos
13	DF	BRA	Gabriel
20	DF	BRA	Edcarlos
8	MF	BRA	Josué
10	MF	BRA	Danilo

No.	Pos.	Nation	Player
14	MF	BRA	Alê
7	MF	BRA	Renan
17	MF	BRA	Vélber
19	MF	BRA	Souza
11	MF	BRA	Nildo
18	MF	BRA	Daniel Rossi
18	MF	BRA	César Sampaio
29	FW	BRA	Marcinho
21	FW	BRA	Diego Tardelli
9	FW	BRA	Grafite

== Scorers ==
Position	Nation	Playing position	Name	Campeonato Paulista	Copa Libertadores	Campeonato Brasileiro	Copa Sudamericana	Friendly match	Total
1	(Brazil)	FW	Grafite	5	4	17	1	0	27
2	(Brazil)	FW	Luís Fabiano	8	8	5	0	0	21
3	(Brazil)	DF	Cicinho	0	0	9	1	1	11
=	(Brazil)	MF	Danilo	0	1	8	0	0	11
4	(Brazil)	FW	Diego Tardelli	1	0	7	0	0	8
5	(Brazil)	DF	Gustavo Nery	1	2	3	0	1	7
=	(Brazil)	MF	Souza	3	0	3	0	1	7
6	(Brazil)	MF	Marquinhos	2	2	1	0	0	5
=	(Brazil)	GK	Rogério Ceni	0	2	3	0	0	5
7	(Brazil)	DF	Fabão	1	1	1	0	1	4
=	(Brazil)	DF	Gabriel	0	0	3	0	1	4
=	(Brazil)	DF	Rodrigo	0	0	3	1	0	4
8	(Brazil)	MF	Vélber	0	0	3	0	0	3
9	(Brazil)	MF	Fábio Simplício	0	0	2	0	0	2
=	(Brazil)	FW	Jean	0	0	2	0	0	2
=	(Brazil)	MF	Nildo	0	0	2	0	0	2
10	(Brazil)	MF	César Sampaio	0	0	1	0	0	1
=	(Uruguay)	DF	Diego Lugano	0	0	1	0	0	1
=	(Brazil)	DF	Fábio Santos	0	0	1	0	0	1
=	(Brazil)	MF	Rafinha	0	0	0	0	1	1
=	(Brazil)	DF	Júnior	0	0	1	0	0	1
=	(Brazil)	FW	Marcinho	0	0	1	0	0	1
/	/	/	Own Goals	0	1	1	0	1	3
			Total	21	21	78	3	7	130

== Overall ==
Games played	74 (10 Campeonato Paulista, 12 Copa Libertadores, 46 Campeonato Brasileiro, 4 Copa Sudamericana, 2 Friendly match)
Games won	42 (8 Campeonato Paulista, 8 Copa Libertadores, 24 Campeonato Brasileiro, 0 Copa Sudamericana, 2 Friendly match)
Games drawn	15 (1 Campeonato Paulista, 1 Copa Libertadores, 10 Campeonato Brasileiro, 3 Copa Sudamericana, 0 Friendly match)
Games lost	17 (1 Campeonato Paulista, 3 Copa Libertadores, 12 Campeonato Brasileiro, 1 Copa Sudamericana, 0 Friendly match)
Goals scored	130
Goals conceded	66
Goal difference	+64
Best result	7–0 (H) v Paysandu – Campeonato Brasileiro – 2004.09.28
Worst result	0–3 (A) v LDU Quito – Copa Libertadores – 2004.03.04
Top scorer	Grafite (27 goals)

Source: São Paulo FC

== Friendlies ==
12 April National	Avaí (Brazil)	0–6	(Brazil) São Paulo	Florianópolis
(UTC-3)			Fabão 16'; Gustavo Nery 33'; Cicinho 48'; Jean Elias 72' (o.g.); Gabriel 82'; Souza 91'	Stadium: Estádio Aderbal Ramos da Silva (Ressacada); Attendance: 3,555; Referee: Luís Orlando de Souza (BRA)

2 June International	Los Angeles Galaxy (United States)	0–1	(Brazil) São Paulo	Carson
19:30 (UTC-8)		Report	Rafinha 85'	Stadium: The Home Depot Center; Attendance: 10,009

== Official competitions ==
=== Campeonato Paulista ===
21 January Group 1	São Paulo	0–0	Ponte Preta	São Paulo
20:30 (UTC-3)		Report		Stadium: Estádio Cícero Pompeu de Toledo (Morumbi); Attendance: 5,328; Referee: Silvia Regina de Oliveira

25 January Group 1	Portuguesa	2–3	São Paulo	São Paulo
17:00 (UTC-3)	Paulo Isidoro 51'; Lucas 65'	Report	Luís Fabiano 36', 39'; Grafite 67'	Stadium: Estádio Oswaldo Teixeira Duarte (Canindé); Attendance: 5,698; Referee: Anselmo da Costa

1 February Group 1	Portuguesa Santista	1–4	São Paulo	Santos
17:00 (UTC-3)	Nando 3'	Report	Luís Fabiano 26', 35', 90'; Grafite 44'	Stadium: Estádio Ulrico Mursa; Attendance: 3,177; Referee: Edílson Pereira de Carvalho

8 February Group 1	América	0–2	São Paulo	São José do Rio Preto
16:00 (UTC-3)		Report	Luís Fabiano 44', 45'	Stadium: Estádio Benedito Teixeira (Teixeirão); Attendance: 8,551; Referee: Paulo César de Oliveira

15 February Group 1	São Paulo	1–0	Corinthians	São Paulo
16:00 (UTC-3)	Fabão 29'	Report		Stadium: Estádio Oswaldo Teixeira Duarte (Canindé); Attendance: 20,875; Referee: Cléber Wellington Abade

21 February Group 1	São Paulo	3–0	Atlético Sorocaba	São Paulo
16:00 (UTC-3)	Luís Fabiano 17'; Souza 54'; Marquinhos 59'	Report		Stadium: Estádio Cícero Pompeu de Toledo (Morumbi); Attendance: 6,319; Referee: Eduardo César Coronado Coelho

29 February Group 1	Rio Branco	1–2	São Paulo	Americana
16:00 (UTC-3)	Rivaldo 31'	Report	Grafite 18'; Marquinhos 41'	Stadium: Estádio Décio Vitta; Attendance: 6,180; Referee: Philippe Lombard

7 March Group 1	São Paulo	4–0	União Barbarense	São Paulo
16:00 (UTC-3)	Diego Tardelli 32'; Gustavo Nery 42'; Souza 83', 89'	Report		Stadium: Estádio Cícero Pompeu de Toledo (Morumbi); Attendance: 3,091; Referee: Edílson Pereira de Carvalho

14 March Group 1	Juventus	1–2	São Paulo	São Caetano do Sul
16:00 (UTC-3)	Terrão 58'	Report	Grafite 32', 43'	Stadium: Estádio Anacleto Campanella; Attendance: 2,634; Referee: Sálvio Espínola Fagundes Filho

21 March Quarterfinal	São Paulo	0–2	São Caetano	São Paulo
16:00 (UTC-3)		Report	Fabrício Carvalho 36', 57'	Stadium: Estádio Cícero Pompeu de Toledo (Morumbi); Attendance: 21,204; Referee: Luís Marcelo Vicentin Cansian

==== Record ====
Final Position	Points	Matches	Wins	Draws	Losses	Goals For	Goals Away	Win%
5th	25	10	8	1	1	21	7	83%

=== Copa Libertadores ===
11 February Group 4	Alianza Lima (Peru)	1–2	(Brazil) São Paulo	Lima
18:45 (UTC-4)	Vílchez 24'	Report	Rogério Ceni 22'; Fabão 64'	Stadium: Estadio Nacional; Referee: Claudio Martín (ARG)

26 February Group 4	São Paulo (Brazil)	3–1	(Chile) Cobreloa	São Paulo
19:00 (UTC-3)	Luís Fabiano 3', 90+3'; Fuentes 11' (o.g.)	Report	Cicinho 47' (o.g.)	Stadium: Estádio Cícero Pompeu de Toledo (Morumbi); Attendance: 54,748; Referee: Carlos Torres (PAR)

4 March Group 4	LDU Quito (Ecuador)	3–0	(Brazil) São Paulo	Quito
19:15 (UTC-5)	Paredes 39'; Espinoza 45'; Urrutia 81'	Report		Stadium: Estadio de Liga Deportiva Universitaria (Casa Blanca); Referee: Héctor Baldassi (ARG)

10 March Group 4	São Paulo (Brazil)	1–0	(Ecuador) LDU Quito	São Paulo
21:45 (UTC-3)	Luís Fabiano 74'	Report		Stadium: Estádio Cícero Pompeu de Toledo (Morumbi); Attendance: 52,262; Referee: Gabriel Brazenas (ARG)

24 March Group 4	Cobreloa (Chile)	1–2	(Brazil) São Paulo	Calama
20:45 (UTC-4)	Dinamarca 28' (pen.)	Report	Grafite 15'; Marquinhos 24'	Stadium: Estadio Municipal de Calama; Referee: Ricardo Grance (PAR)

7 April Group 4	São Paulo (Brazil)	3–1	(Peru) Alianza Lima	São Paulo
21:45 (UTC-3)	Marquinhos 36'; Luís Fabiano 46', 68'	Report	Roberto Silva 23'	Stadium: Estádio Cícero Pompeu de Toledo (Morumbi); Attendance: 42,728; Referee: Héctor Baldassi (ARG)

6 May Round of 16	Rosario Central (Argentina)	1–0	(Brazil) São Paulo	Rosario
20:00 (UTC-3)	Belloso 86'	Report		Stadium: Estadio Dr. Lisandro de la Torre (Gigante de Arroyito); Referee: Carlos Amarilla (PAR)

12 May Round of 16	São Paulo (Brazil)	2–1 (5–4 p)	(Argentina) Rosario Central	São Paulo
21:45 (UTC-3)	Grafite 45+1', 76'	Report	Herrera 6'	Stadium: Estádio Cícero Pompeu de Toledo (Morumbi); Attendance: 59,413; Referee: Jorge Larrionda (URU)
	Penalties
	Cicinho (penalty missed); Grafite (penalty scored); Luís Fabiano (penalty scored); Fabão (penalty scored); Rogério Ceni (penalty scored); Gabriel (penalty scored)		(penalty scored) Carbonari; (penalty scored) Herrera; (penalty scored) Talamonti; (penalty scored) Ferrari; (penalty missed) Gaona; (penalty missed) Irace

19 May Quarterfinals	São Paulo (Brazil)	3–0	(Venezuela) Deportivo Táchira	São Paulo
19:30 (UTC-3)	Rogério Ceni 32'; Luís Fabiano 48'; Gustavo Nery 58'	Report		Stadium: Estádio Cícero Pompeu de Toledo (Morumbi); Attendance: 56,853; Referee: René Ortube (BOL)

26 May Quarterfinals	Deportivo Táchira (Venezuela)	1–4	(Brazil) São Paulo	San Cristóbal
20:45 (UTC-4:30)	Panigutti 6'	Report	Grafite 24'; Luís Fabiano 58', 88'; Gustavo Nery 67'	Stadium: Estadio Polideportivo de Pueblo Nuevo; Referee: Henry Cervantes (COL)

9 June Semifinals	São Paulo (Brazil)	0–0	(Colombia) Once Caldas	São Paulo
21:45 (UTC-3)		Report		Stadium: Estádio Cícero Pompeu de Toledo (Morumbi); Attendance: 70,504; Referee: Carlos Amarilla (PAR)

16 June Semifinals	Once Caldas (Colombia)	2–1	(Brazil) São Paulo	Manizales
19:45 (UTC-4)	Alcázar 27'; Agudelo 90'	Report	Danilo 32'	Stadium: Estadio Palogrande; Referee: Jorge Larrionda (URU)

==== Record ====
Final Position	Points	Matches	Wins	Draws	Losses	Goals For	Goals Away	Win%
3rd	25	12	8	1	3	21	12	69%

=== Campeonato Brasileiro ===
22 April Round 1	São Paulo	1–0	Atlético Paranaense	São Paulo
20:30 (UTC-3)	Gustavo Nery 88'	Report		Stadium: Estádio Cícero Pompeu de Toledo (Morumbi); Attendance: 5,038; Referee: Djalma José Beltrami Teixeira

25 April Round 2	Criciúma	1–1	São Paulo	Criciúma
18:00 (UTC-3)	Rafael 77' (pen.)	Report	Gustavo Nery 10'	Stadium: Estádio Heriberto Hülse; Attendance: 7,805; Referee: Edilson Soares da Silva

28 April Round 3	São Paulo	1–0	Fluminense	São Paulo
21:45 (UTC-3)	Grafite 35'	Report		Stadium: Estádio Cícero Pompeu de Toledo (Morumbi); Attendance: 5,802; Referee: Evandro Rogério Roman

2 May Round 4	Guarani	2–3	São Paulo	Campinas
18:00 (UTC-3)	Viola 31', 61'	Report	Fábio Simplício 48'; Luís Fabiano 59'; Fabão 89'	Stadium: Estádio Brinco de Ouro da Princesa; Attendance: 11,487; Referee: Wilson Luis Seneme

9 May Round 5	Coritiba	1–2	São Paulo	Curitiba
18:00 (UTC-3)	Jucemar 50'	Report	Luís Fabiano 23'; Gustavo Nery 27'	Stadium: Estádio Major Antônio Couto Pereira; Attendance: 16,900; Referee: Edílson Soares da Silva

16 May Round 6	São Paulo	2–2	Paraná	São Paulo
18:00 (UTC-3)	Rodrigo 4'; Rogério Ceni 47'	Report	Axel 22'; Beto 50'	Stadium: Estádio Cícero Pompeu de Toledo (Morumbi); Attendance: 7,410; Referee: Elvécio Zequetto

23 May Round 7	Cruzeiro	2–1	São Paulo	Belo Horizonte
18:00 (UTC-3)	Jardel 16'; Dudu 30'	Report	Gabriel 53'	Stadium: Estádio Governador Magalhães Pinto (Mineirão); Attendance: 10,254; Referee: Héber Roberto Lopes

30 May Round 8	São Paulo	1–1	Corinthians	São Paulo
16:00 (UTC-3)	Fábio Simplício 26'	Report	Renato 32'	Stadium: Estádio Cícero Pompeu de Toledo (Morumbi); Attendance: 14,813; Referee: Paulo César de Oliveira

12 June Round 9	São Paulo	3–2	Grêmio	São Paulo
18:00 (UTC-3)	Cicinho 33'; Luís Fabiano 37'; Marquinhos 42'	Report	Christian 22', 51'	Stadium: Estádio Cícero Pompeu de Toledo (Morumbi); Attendance: 10,381; Referee: Wilson de Souza Mendonça

20 June Round 10	Paysandu	1–0	São Paulo	Belém
16:00 (UTC-3)	Júlio Santos 65'	Report		Stadium: Estádio Estadual Jornalista Edgar Augusto Proença (Mangueirão); Attendance: 13,712; Referee: Wagner Tardelli Azevedo

27 June Round 11	Palmeiras	2–1	São Paulo	São Paulo
16:00 (UTC-3)	Vagner Love 36', 61'	Report	Cicinho 82'	Stadium: Estádio Municipal Paulo Machado de Carvalho (Pacaembu); Attendance: 12,523; Referee: Sálvio Spinola Fagundes Filho

3 July Round 12	São Paulo	2–0	Ponte Preta	São Paulo
16:00 (UTC-3)	Cicinho 22'; Vélber 54'	Report		Stadium: Estádio Cícero Pompeu de Toledo (Morumbi); Attendance: 3,997; Referee: Sílvia Regina de Oliveira

6 July Round 13	São Paulo	1–0	Atlético Mineiro	São Paulo
20:30 (UTC-3)	Danilo 54'	Report		Stadium: Estádio Cícero Pompeu de Toledo (Morumbi); Attendance: 4,529; Referee: Luís Antônio Silva Santos

10 July Round 14	Santos	2–1	São Paulo	Santos
16:00 (UTC-3)	Deivid 32'; Ricardinho 90+1'	Report	Danilo 24'	Stadium: Estádio Urbano Caldeira (Vila Belmiro); Attendance: 14,698; Referee: Luis Marcelo Vicentin Cansian

13 July Round 15	São Caetano	0–0	São Paulo	São Caetano do Sul
20:30 (UTC-3)		Report		Stadium: Estádio Anacleto Campanella; Attendance: 5,770; Referee: Sálvio Spinola Fagundes Filho

17 July Round 16	São Paulo	2–1	Figueirense	São Paulo
20:30 (UTC-3)	Rogério Ceni 12' (pen.), 72'	Report	Sérgio Manoel 84'	Stadium: Estádio Cícero Pompeu de Toledo (Morumbi); Attendance: 3,500; Referee: Alicio Pena Júnior

20 July Round 17	Botafogo	1–0	São Paulo	Niterói
21:45 (UTC-3)	Gláucio 87'	Report		Stadium: Estádio Caio Martins; Attendance: 1,582; Referee: Wilson de Souza Mendonça

24 July Round 18	São Paulo	1–0	Vasco da Gama	São Paulo
16:00 (UTC-3)	Danilo 36'	Report		Stadium: Estádio Cícero Pompeu de Toledo (Morumbi); Attendance: 7,176; Referee: Evandro Rogério Roman

28 July Round 19	Juventude	1–2	São Paulo	Caxias do Sul
21:45 (UTC-3)	Zé Rodolpho 3'	Report	Diego Tardelli 66'; Vélber 80'	Stadium: Estádio Alfredo Jaconi; Attendance: 3,874; Referee: Clever Assunção Gonçalves

1 August Round 20	Internacional	1–1	São Paulo	Porto Alegre
18:00 (UTC-3)	Marabá 86'	Report	Jean 71'	Stadium: Estádio José Pinheiro Borda (Beira-Rio); Attendance: 7,650; Referee: Elvécio Zequetto

5 August Round 21	São Paulo	2–1	Vitória	São Paulo
20:30 (UTC-3)	Luís Fabiano 16', 17'	Report	Obina 25'	Stadium: Estádio Cícero Pompeu de Toledo (Morumbi); Attendance: 4,492; Referee: Wilson de Souza Mendonça

8 August Round 22	Flamengo	1–0	São Paulo	Volta Redonda
16:00 (UTC-3)	Dimba 58'	Report		Stadium: Estádio Raulino de Oliveira; Attendance: 7,374; Referee: Lourival Dias Lima Filho

11 August Round 23	São Paulo	4–0	Goiás	São Paulo
20:30 (UTC-3)	Vélber 16'; Cicinho 54'; Grafite 79'; Gabriel 90'	Report		Stadium: Estádio Cícero Pompeu de Toledo (Morumbi); Attendance: 5,697; Referee: Antônio Silva Santos

15 August Round 24	Atlético Paranaense	1–0	São Paulo	Curitiba
18:00 (UTC-3)	Dagoberto 37'	Report		Stadium: Estádio Joaquim Américo Guimarães (Arena da Baixada); Attendance: 18,865; Referee: Luciano Almeida

19 August Round 25	São Paulo	2–0	Criciúma	São Paulo
20:30 (UTC-3)	Grafite 39'; Gabriel 75'	Report		Stadium: Estádio Cícero Pompeu de Toledo (Morumbi); Attendance: 3,671; Referee: Lourival Dias Lima Filho

22 August Round 26	Fluminense	1–0	São Paulo	Volta Redonda
16:00 (UTC-3)	Fabão 3' (o.g.)	Report		Stadium: Estádio Raulino de Oliveira; Attendance: 6,689; Referee: Carlos Eugênio Simon

28 August Round 27	São Paulo	3–3	Guarani	São Paulo
16:00 (UTC-3)	Grafite 37'; Lugano 44'; Diego Tardelli 45'	Report	Harison 30'; Valdir Papel 33'; Viola 90+4'	Stadium: Estádio Cícero Pompeu de Toledo (Morumbi); Attendance: 3,653; Referee: Paulo César de Oliveira

1 September Round 28	São Paulo	2–3	Coritiba	São Paulo
20:30 (UTC-3)	Danilo 5'; César Sampaio 83'	Report	Aristizábal 1'; Tuta 17'; Roberto Brum 41'	Stadium: Estádio Cícero Pompeu de Toledo (Morumbi); Attendance: 2,170; Referee: Leonardo Gaciba da Silva

8 September Round 29	Paraná	0–2	São Paulo	Curitiba
20:30 (UTC-3)		Report	Rodrigo 12'; Danilo 53'	Stadium: Centro Poliesportivo Pinheiro (Pinheirão); Attendance: 3,390; Referee: Márcio Rezende de Freitas

11 September Round 30	São Paulo	0–0	Cruzeiro	São Paulo
16:00 (UTC-3)		Report		Stadium: Estádio Municipal Paulo Machado de Carvalho (Pacaembu); Attendance: 13,074; Referee: Edílson Soares da Silva

19 September Round 31	Corinthians	0–0	São Paulo	São Paulo
16:00 (UTC-3)		Report		Stadium: Estádio Cícero Pompeu de Toledo (Morumbi); Attendance: 31,180; Referee: Sálvio Spinola Fagundes Filho

25 September Round 32	Grêmio	2–1	São Paulo	Porto Alegre
18:00 (UTC-3)	Cláudio Pitbull 32', 83'	Report	Cicinho 87'	Stadium: Estádio Olímpico Monumental; Attendance: 12,850; Referee: Luis Antonio Silva Santos

28 September Round 33	São Paulo	7–0	Paysandu	São Paulo
20:30 (UTC-3)	Cicinho 30', 59'; Nildo 34'; Grafite 53', 71'; Souza 76'; Jean 82'	Report		Stadium: Estádio Cícero Pompeu de Toledo (Morumbi); Attendance: 2,672; Referee: Elvecio Zequetto

2 October Round 34	São Paulo	2–1	Palmeiras	São Paulo
16:00 (UTC-3)	Nildo 46'; Cicinho 90+2'	Report	Osmar 41'	Stadium: Estádio Cícero Pompeu de Toledo (Morumbi); Attendance: 12,501; Referee: Sálvio Espínola Fagundes Filho

6 October Round 35	Ponte Preta	0–1	São Paulo	Campinas
21:50 (UTC-3)		Report	Grafite 23'	Stadium: Estádio Moisés Lucarelli; Attendance: 4,991; Referee: Cleber Wellington Abade

17 October Round 36	Atlético Mineiro	0–5	São Paulo	Belo Horizonte
16:00 (UTC-3)		Report	Grafite 5', 18', 28'; Danilo 10', 52'	Stadium: Estádio Raimundo Sampaio (Independência); Attendance: 15,512; Referee: Luís Alberto Sardinha Bites

24 October Round 37	São Paulo	1–0	Santos	São Paulo
16:00 (UTC-3)	Grafite 31'	Report		Stadium: Estádio Cícero Pompeu de Toledo (Morumbi); Attendance: 20,871; Referee: Wilson Luís Seneme

27 October; 3 November Round 38	São Paulo	4–2	São Caetano	São Paulo
20:30 (UTC-3)	Danilo 61'; Júnior 62'; Grafite 67'; Rodrigo 78'	Report	Marcinho 69'; Ânderson Lima 74'	Stadium: Estádio Cícero Pompeu de Toledo (Morumbi); Attendance: 14,551; Referee: Cleber Welington Abade

30 October Round 39	Figueirense	1–0	São Paulo	Florianópolis
20:30 (UTC-3)	Genílson 69'	Report		Stadium: Estádio Orlando Scarpelli; Attendance: 12,580; Referee: Luciano Augusto Almeida

7 November Round 40	São Paulo	5–2	Botafogo	São Paulo
18:00 (UTC-3)	Grafite 30', 76'; Cicinho 74'; Diego Tardelli 75', 90+1'	Report	Caio 36'; César Sampaio 79' (o.g.)	Stadium: Estádio Cícero Pompeu de Toledo (Morumbi); Attendance: 9,697; Referee: Carlos Eugênio Simon

14 November Round 41	Vasco da Gama	0–0	São Paulo	Rio de Janeiro
16:00 (UTC-3)		Report		Stadium: Estádio Vasco da Gama (São Januário); Attendance: 5,041; Referee: Lourival Lima Dias Filho

21 November Round 42	São Paulo	4–0	Juventude	São Paulo
18:00 (UTC-3)	Marcinho 21'; Diego Tardelli 57'; Souza 78', 86'	Report		Stadium: Estádio Cícero Pompeu de Toledo (Morumbi); Attendance: 9,046; Referee: Edílson Soares da Silva

27 November Round 43	São Paulo	2–1	Internacional	São Paulo
18:10 (UTC-3)	Sangaletti 32' (o.g.); Grafite 79'	Report	Danilo Gomes 14'	Stadium: Estádio Cícero Pompeu de Toledo (Morumbi); Attendance: 13,122; Referee: Lourival Dias Filho

5 December Round 44	Vitória	1–4	São Paulo	Salvador
16:00 (UTC-3)	Obina 86'	Report	Diego Tardelli 20', 56'; Grafite 37'; Fábio Santos 87'	Stadium: Estádio Manoel Barradas (Barradão); Attendance: 12,620; Referee: Leonardo Gaciba da Silva

12 December Round 45	São Paulo	1–1	Flamengo	São Paulo
16:00 (UTC-3)	Grafite 27'	Report	Dimba 13'	Stadium: Estádio Cícero Pompeu de Toledo (Morumbi); Attendance: 27,108; Referee: Sérgio da Silva Carvalho

19 December Round 46	Goiás	2–0	São Paulo	Goiânia
16:00 (UTC-3)	Alex Dias 31'; Rodrigo Tabata 81'	Report		Stadium: Estádio do Governo do Estado de Goiás (Serra Dourada); Attendance: 6,522; Referee: Lourival Dias Filho

==== Record ====
Final Position	Points	Matches	Wins	Draws	Losses	Goals For	Goals Away	Win%
3rd	82	46	24	10	12	78	43	59%

=== Copa Sudamericana ===
15 September First round	São Caetano (Brazil)	1–1	(Brazil) São Paulo	São Caetano do Sul
21:50 (UTC-3)	Gustavo 35'	Report	Grafite 72'	Stadium: Estádio Anacleto Campanella; Referee: Silvia Regina de Oliveira (BRA)

22 September First round	São Paulo (Brazil)	1–1 (4–1 p)	(Brazil) São Caetano	São Paulo
21:50 (UTC-3)	Cicinho 20'	Report	Serginho 23'	Stadium: Estádio Cícero Pompeu de Toledo (Morumbi); Referee: Wilson de Souza Mendonça (BRA)
	Penalties
	Rogério Ceni (penalty scored); César Sampaio (penalty scored); Danilo (penalty scored); Nildo (penalty scored)		(penalty scored) Danilo; (penalty missed) Thiago; (penalty missed) Gustavo

10 October Second round	Santos (Brazil)	1–0	(Brazil) São Paulo	Santos
16:00 (UTC-3)	Elano 76'	Report		Stadium: Estádio Urbano Caldeira (Vila Belmiro); Referee: Carlos Simon (BRA)

20 October Second round	São Paulo (Brazil)	1–1	(Brazil) Santos	São Paulo
21:50 (UTC-3)	Rodrigo 43'	Report	Preto Casagrande 82'	Stadium: Estádio Cícero Pompeu de Toledo (Morumbi); Referee: Wagner Tardelli (BRA)

==== Record ====
Final Position	Points	Matches	Wins	Draws	Losses	Goals For	Goals Away	Win%
22nd	3	4	0	3	1	3	4	25%

== See also ==
- São Paulo FC
