= Clássico Majestoso =

Football derby between Corinthians and São Paulo FC

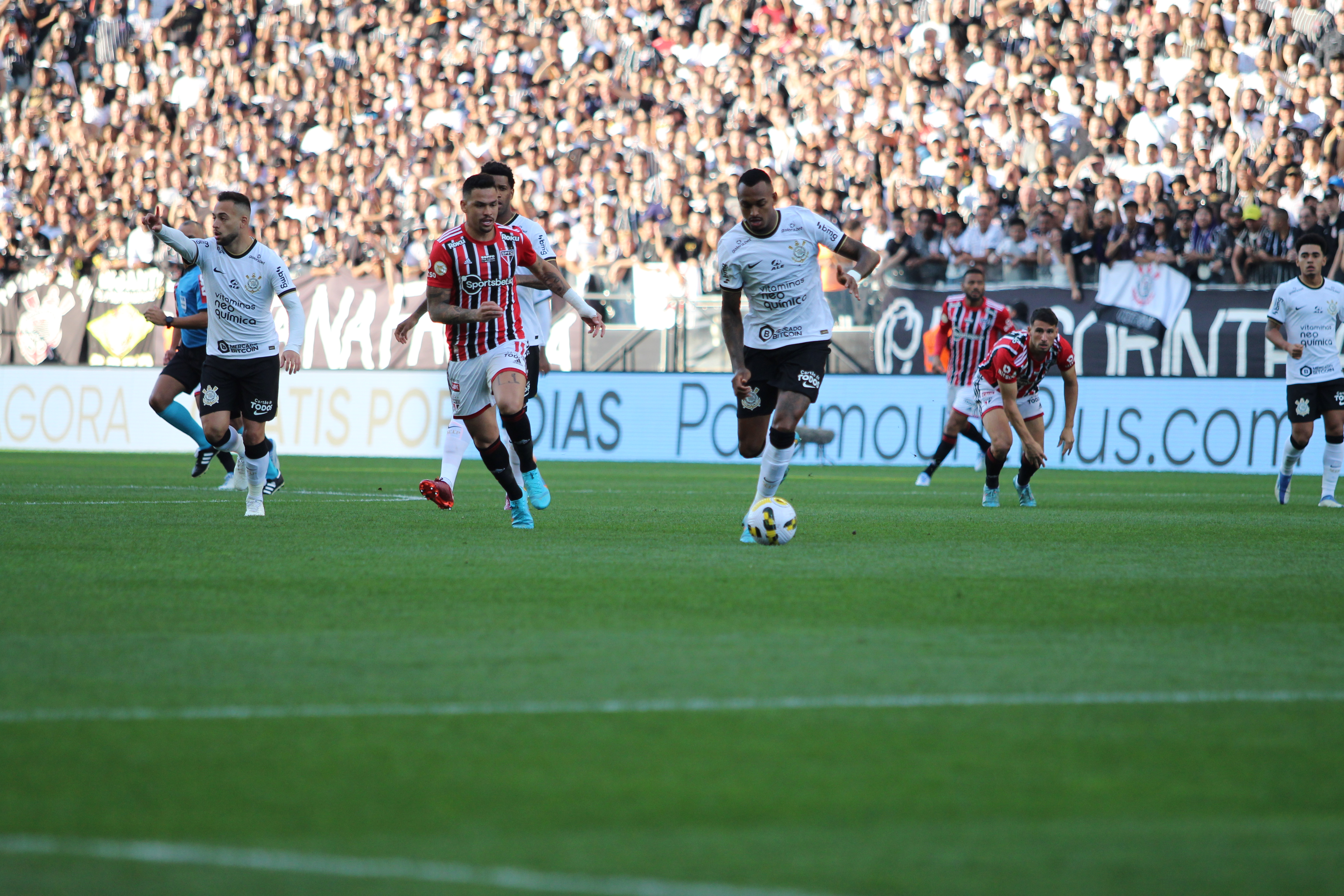
- Majestoso in the 2022 Campeonato Brasileiro.
- Location: São Paulo, São Paulo, Brazil
- Teams: Corinthians; São Paulo
- First meeting: Corinthians 2–1 São Paulo; 25 May 1930; Campeonato Paulista
- Latest meeting: São Paulo 0–0 Corinthians; 4 November 2026; Brazil Série A
- Stadiums: Neo Química Arena (Corinthians); Morumbi (São Paulo)

Statistics
- Total meetings: 368
- Most wins: Corinthians (135)
- Most player appearances: Rogério Ceni (67)
- Top scorer: Teleco (27 goals)
- All-time series: Corinthians: 135; Drawn: 118; São Paulo: 115
- Largest victory: São Paulo 6–1 Corinthians; September 10, 1933; Corinthians 6–1 São Paulo; November 22, 2015

Clássico Majestoso (English: Majestic Derby) is the name given to the football rivalry between Corinthians and São Paulo FC, two of the biggest clubs of São Paulo and Brazilian football. The name was first used by Gazeta Esportiva newspaper's Thomaz Mazzoni. It is considered one of the biggest derbies of Brazil.

The Majestoso is the only Brazilian derby that has taken place in finals at state, interstate, national and international level competitions alike; individually, it is the only Brazilian derby to have taken place at Recopa Sudamericana (in 2013). It is also the state-rivalry with most supporters involved in Brazil, as Corinthians and São Paulo have the second and third largest fanbases of Brazil, respectively. Alongside Santos and Palmeiras, Corinthians and São Paulo are two of São Paulo's four major football teams.

== Statistics ==
=== General ===
Team	W	D	L	GF
Corinthians	135	118	115	520
São Paulo	115	118	135	499

- Last match: São Paulo 0–0 Corinthians (2026 Campeonato Brasileiro, 4 November 2026)

=== Campeonato Brasileiro ===
*Including the Torneio Roberto Gomes Pedrosa

Team	W	D	L	GF
Corinthians	29	32	21	94
São Paulo	21	32	29	85

- Last match: São Paulo 0–0 Corinthians (4 November 2026)

=== Campeonato Paulista ===
Team	W	D	L	GF
Corinthians	68	61	62	250
São Paulo	62	61	68	259

- Last Match: Corinthians 1–1 São Paulo (18 January 2026)

== Decisive matches ==
=== List of major finals between the clubs ===
Season	Competition	Date	Match	Score	Winner
1982	Campeonato Paulista	8 December 1982	SPFC – COR	0–1	Corinthians
1982	Campeonato Paulista	12 December 1982	COR – SPFC	3–1	Corinthians
1983	Campeonato Paulista	11 December 1983	SPFC – COR	0–1	Corinthians
1983	Campeonato Paulista	14 December 1983	COR – SPFC	1–1	Corinthians
1987	Campeonato Paulista	26 August 1987	SPFC – COR	2–1	São Paulo
1987	Campeonato Paulista	30 August 1987	COR – SPFC	0–0	São Paulo
1990	Brazilian Série A	December 13, 1990	SPFC – COR	0–1	Corinthians
1990	Brazilian Série A	December 16, 1990	COR – SPFC	1–0	Corinthians
1991	Campeonato Paulista	December 8, 1991	SPFC – COR	3–0	São Paulo
1991	Campeonato Paulista	December 12, 1991	COR – SPFC	0–0	São Paulo
1998	Campeonato Paulista	May 3, 1998	SPFC – COR	1–2	São Paulo
1998	Campeonato Paulista	May 10, 1998	COR – SPFC	1–3	São Paulo
2002	Torneio Rio-São Paulo	December 5, 2002	SPFC – COR	2–3	Corinthians
2002	Torneio Rio-São Paulo	December 12, 2002	COR – SPFC	1–1	Corinthians
2003	Campeonato Paulista	March 16, 2003	COR – SPFC	3–2	Corinthians
2003	Campeonato Paulista	March 22, 2003	SPFC – COR	2–3	Corinthians
2013	Recopa Sudamericana	July 3, 2013	SPFC – COR	1–2	Corinthians
2013	Recopa Sudamericana	July 17, 2013	COR – SPFC	2–0	Corinthians
2019	Campeonato Paulista	April 14, 2019	SPFC – COR	0–0	Corinthians
2019	Campeonato Paulista	April 21, 2019	COR – SPFC	2–1	Corinthians

- Finals won: Corinthians 7, São Paulo 3.

=== Other decisive games ===
Campeonato Paulista

- April 13, 1938: Corinthians 1–1 São Paulo - Corinthians champion
- December 31, 1957: São Paulo 3–1 Corinthians - São Paulo champion
- June 5, 1997: Corinthians 1–1 São Paulo - Corinthians champion

Florida Cup (friendly tournament)

- January 21, 2017: São Paulo 0–0 (4–3 p) Corinthians - São Paulo champion

== Largest victories ==
- São Paulo 6–1, on September 10, 1933
- Corinthians 6–1, on November 22, 2015
- Corinthians 5–0, on March 10, 1996
- Corinthians 5–0, on June 26, 2011
- São Paulo 5–1, on January 1, 1946
- Corinthians 5–1, on April 16, 1947
- Corinthians 5–1, on June 3, 1962
- São Paulo 5–1, on May 8, 2005
- São Paulo 4–0, on October 15, 1944
- Corinthians 4–0, on August 26, 1951
- São Paulo 4–0, on August 10, 1980
- Corinthians 4–0, on June 6, 1999
- São Paulo 4–0, on November 5, 2016

== Stadiums ==
- In the beginning, Corinthians played its games at Estádio Alfredo Schürig, and São Paulo at Estádio da Floresta, and later at the Pacaembu, which eventually became home of the clássico. From the 1970s on, the Morumbi became the new home for the derby, at the request of Tricolor Paulista.
- Since the opening of Corinthians' new stadium, Arena Corinthians, the team has played its home games there.

== List of Série A games ==
These are only the league matches (1971–present); club name in bold indicate win. The score is given at full-time (T), in the goals columns the goalscorer and time when goal was scored is noted.

#	Date	R.	Home team	Away team	Score	Goals (home)	Goals (away)
1	October 17, 1971		**São Paulo**	Corinthians	2–0	Teodoro (70'), Everaldo (74')	
2	November 21, 1971		**São Paulo**	Corinthians	1–0	Toninho Guerreiro (41')	
3	December 4, 1971		Corinthians	São Paulo	0–0		
4	October 18, 1972		**São Paulo**	Corinthians	3–1	Paulo (46'), Terto (76', 84')	Rivelino (53')
5	September 9, 1973		**Corinthians**	São Paulo	1–0	Marco Antonio Visgo (42')	
6	December 2, 1973		Corinthians	São Paulo	0–0		
7	June 9, 1974		São Paulo	Corinthians	1–1	Zé Carlos (51')	Washington (90')
8	October 19, 1975	4	São Paulo	**Corinthians**	0–1		Adilson (87')
9	December 4, 1977	2	**Corinthians**	São Paulo	2–0	Geraldão (5'), Romeu (90')	
10	February 14, 1985	6	São Paulo	**Corinthians**	0–2		João Paulo (14'), Serginho Chulapa (34')
11	March 27, 1985	6	Corinthians	**São Paulo**	1–2	João Paulo (78')	Müller (40'), Oscar (90')
12	October 4, 1987	5	São Paulo	Corinthians	0–0		
13	September 4, 1988	1	Corinthians	**São Paulo**	0–1		Renatinho (89')
14	September 24, 1989	5	**Corinthians**	São Paulo	2–1	Neto (26'), João Paulo (90')	Bobô (90')
15	September 23, 1990	7	São Paulo	Corinthians	1–1	Mário Tilico (73')	Neto (77')
16	December 13, 1990		São Paulo	**Corinthians**	0–1		Wilson Mano (49')
17	December 16, 1990		**Corinthians**	São Paulo	1–0	Tupãzinho (54')	
18	April 7, 1991	12	Corinthians	São Paulo	1–1	Wilson Mano (14')	Macedo (44')
19	March 25, 1992	9	São Paulo	Corinthians	0–0		
20	September 12, 1993	2	São Paulo	Corinthians	1–1	Matosas (89')	Elias (84')
21	October 16, 1993	9	**Corinthians**	São Paulo	1–0	Simão (26')	
22	November 23, 1994	7	Corinthians	**São Paulo**	1–2	Pinga (65')	Cafu (32'), Sierra (68')
23	October 29, 1995	8	**Corinthians**	São Paulo	1–0	Clóvis Cruz (52')	
24	October 20, 1996	16	São Paulo	Corinthians	0–0		
25	August 31, 1997	15	Corinthians	**São Paulo**	0–1		Dodô (58')
26	October 24, 1998	27	São Paulo	**Corinthians**	1–2	França (72')	Didi (20'), Edílson (87')
27	August 29, 1999	8	**Corinthians**	São Paulo	1–0	Ricardinho (58')	
28	November 28, 1999		São Paulo	**Corinthians**	2–3	Raí (29'), Edmílson (40')	Nenê (23'), Ricardinho (31'), Marcelinho Carioca (53')
29	December 5, 1999		**Corinthians**	São Paulo	2–1	Ricardinho (44'), Edílson (72')	Vágner (70')
30	November 12, 2000	32	São Paulo	Corinthians	0–0		
31	November 3, 2001	21	São Paulo	Corinthians	1–1	Kaká (60')	Deivid (86')
32	September 29, 2002	15	São Paulo	Corinthians	2–2	Reinaldo (70', 80')	Gil (57', 89')
33	June 15, 2003	13	Corinthians	**São Paulo**	1–2	Anderson (26')	Fábio Simplício (36'), Jean (59')
34	October 12, 2003	36	**São Paulo**	Corinthians	3–0	Diego Tardelli (76'), Carlos Alberto (87'), Fábio Simplício (90')	
35	March 30, 2004	8	São Paulo	Corinthians	1–1	Fábio Simplício (26')	Renato (32')
36	September 19, 2004	31	Corinthians	São Paulo	0–0		
37	March 8, 2005	3	Corinthians	**São Paulo**	1–5	Carlos Alberto (88')	Rogério Ceni (3), Luizão (13, 47), Danilo (16), Cicinho (73')
38	October 24, 2005	24	São Paulo	Corinthians	1–1	Amoroso (51')	Carlos Alberto (41')
39	March 7, 2006	4	Corinthians	**São Paulo**	1–3	Nilmar (21')	Souza (39'), Alex Dias (69'), Lenílson (73')
40	September 10, 2006	23	São Paulo	Corinthians	0–0		
41	July 14, 2007	11	Corinthians	São Paulo	1–1	Zelão (92')	Dagoberto (82')
42	October 7, 2007	30	São Paulo	**Corinthians**	0–1		Betão (85')
43	June 21, 2009	7	**Corinthians**	São Paulo	3–1	Chicão (12'), Jucilei (27'), Cristian (37')	Richarlyson (35')
44	September 27, 2009	26	São Paulo	Corinthians	1–1	Washington (24')	Ronaldo (20')
45	August 22, 2010	15	**Corinthians**	São Paulo	3–0	Elias (21', 44'), Jucilei (70')	
46	November 7, 2010	34	São Paulo	**Corinthians**	0–2		Elias (39'), Dentinho (84')
47	June 26, 2011	6	**Corinthians**	São Paulo	5–0	Danilo (46'), Liédson (53', 60', 79'), Jorge Henrique (81')	
48	September 21, 2011	25	São Paulo	Corinthians	0–0		
49	August 26, 2012	19	Corinthians	**São Paulo**	1–2	Emerson Sheik (5')	Luis Fabiano (23', 61')
50	December 2, 2012	38	**São Paulo**	Corinthians	3–1	Douglas (14'), Maicon (23', 76')	Guerrero (12')
51	July 28, 2013	9	Corinthians	São Paulo	0–0		
52	October 13, 2013	28	São Paulo	Corinthians	0–0		
53	May 11, 2014	4	São Paulo	Corinthians	1–1	Luis Fabiano (79')	Fágner (48')
54	September 21, 2014	23	**Corinthians**	São Paulo	3–2	Fábio Santos (35' pen., 65' pen.), Guerrero (73')	Souza (5'), Édson Silva (44')
55	August 9, 2015	17	São Paulo	Corinthians	1–1	Luis Fabiano (47')	Luciano (21')
56	November 22, 2015	36	**Corinthians**	São Paulo	6–1	Bruno Henrique (26'), Romero (28', 63'), Edu Dracena (45'), Lucca (60'), Cristian (75' pen.)	Carlinhos (69')
57	July 17, 2016	15	Corinthians	São Paulo	1–1	Bruno Henrique (21')	Cueva (15' pen.)
58	November 5, 2016	34	**São Paulo**	Corinthians	4–0	Cueva (14' pen.); David Neres (60'); Chavez (66'); Luiz Araujo (90+2')	
59	June 11, 2017	6	**Corinthians**	São Paulo	3–2	Romero (7'); Gabriel (41'); Jadson (63' pen.)	Gilberto (18'); Wellington Nem (84')
60	September 24, 2017	25	São Paulo	Corinthians	1–1	Petros (28')	Clayson (78')
61	July 21, 2018	14	**São Paulo**	Corinthians	3–1	Anderson Martins (56'); Reinaldo (70', 82')	Jonathas (90+1')
62	November 10, 2018	33	São Paulo	Corinthians	1–1	Ralf (72')	Brenner (81')
63	May 26, 2019	6	**Corinthians**	São Paulo	1–0	Pedrinho (7')	
64	October 13, 2019	25	**São Paulo**	Corinthians	1–0	Reinaldo (66' pen.)	
65	August 30, 2020	6	**São Paulo**	Corinthians	2–1	Hernanes (14'); Brenner (90+2')	Ramiro (36')
66	December 13, 2020	25	**Corinthians**	São Paulo	1–0	Otero (25')	
67	June 30, 2021	8	Corinthians	São Paulo	0–0		
68	October 18, 2021	27	**São Paulo**	Corinthians	1–0	Calleri (7')	
69	May 22, 2022	7	Corinthians	São Paulo	1–1	Adson (80')	Calleri (45+6')
70	September 11, 2022	26	São Paulo	Corinthians	1–1	Éder (33')	Yuri Alberto (14')
71	May 14, 2023	6	Corinthians	São Paulo	1–1	Róger Guedes (45+5')	Michel Araújo (15')
72	September 30, 2023	25	**São Paulo**	Corinthians	2–1	Calleri (40', 45+2')	Ángel Romero (3')
73	June 16, 2024	9	Corinthians	São Paulo	2–2	Igor Coronado (31'); Gustavo Mosquito (45+3')	Lucas Moura (4'); Cacá (41' OG)
74	September 29, 2024	28	**São Paulo**	Corinthians	3–1	Lucas Moura (45+8' pen.); Robert Arboleda (75'); André Silva (90+8')	Yuri Alberto (83')
75	July 19, 2025	15	**São Paulo**	Corinthians	2–0	Luciano (32', 35')	
76	November 20, 2025	34	**Corinthians**	São Paulo	3–1	Yuri Alberto (31', 89'), Memphis Depay (84')	Gonzalo Tapia (54')
77	May 10, 2026	15	**Corinthians**	São Paulo	3–2	Raniele (16'), Matheuzinho (51'), Breno Bidon (56')	Luciano (40'), Matheuzinho (88' OG)
78	November 4, 2026	34	São Paulo	Corinthians	0–0		

=== Head-to-head results ===
Corinthians wins	25
Draws	32
São Paulo wins	21
Corinthians goals	87
São Paulo goals	83
Total matches	78

== Honours ==
Competitions	Corinthians	São Paulo
Brazilian Championship	7	6
Brazil Cup	4	1
Brazil Supercup	2	1
Copa Libertadores	1	3
Copa Sudamericana	-	1
Recopa Sudamericana	1	2
Supercopa Libertadores	-	1
Copa Conmebol	-	1
Copa Master de CONMEBOL	-	1
FIFA Club World Cup/Intercontinental Cup	2	3
Total	17	20
Other Competitions	Corinthians	São Paulo
Paulista Championship	31	22
Paulista Superchampionship	-	1
Rio–São Paulo	5	1
Total General	53	44

Note: Although the Intercontinental Cup and the FIFA Club World Cup are officially different tournaments, they are the official competitions that grant the title of world champion.

== See also ==
- Derby Paulista
- Choque-Rei
