= 2002 Copa dos Campeões =

3rd edition of a Brazilian association football competition

Tournament details
- Country: Brazil
- Dates: 3 July – 4 August
- Teams: 16

Final positions
- Champions: (Pará) Paysandu (1st title)
- Runners-up: (Minas Gerais) Cruzeiro

Tournament statistics
- Matches played: 32
- Goals scored: 83 (2.59 per match)
- Top goal scorer(s): (Brazil) Fábio Júnior (6 goals)

The 2002 Copa dos Campeões was the third and last edition of the football competition held in Brazil. As in previous editions, it was carried out in a neutral field in three states in the Northeast Region (Piauí, Rio Grande do Norte and Ceará - place of the decision) and in Pará (North Region).

In the finals, Paysandu defeated Cruzeiro 3–0 on penalties after tied 5–5 on aggregate to win their first title and a place in the group stage of the 2003 Copa Libertadores.

== Qualified teams ==
Team	Qualification
(Minas Gerais) Atlético Mineiro	2002 Copa Sul-Minas 3rd place
(Paraná (state)) Atlético Paranaense	2002 Copa Sul-Minas runners-up
Bahia	2002 Copa do Nordeste champions
(São Paulo (state)) Corinthians	2002 Torneio Rio-São Paulo champions
(Minas Gerais) Cruzeiro	2002 Copa Sul-Minas champions
(Rio de Janeiro (state)) Flamengo	2001 Copa dos Campeões champions
(Rio de Janeiro (state)) Fluminense	2002 Torneio Rio-São Paulo 5th place
Goiás	2002 Copa Centro-Oeste champions
(Rio Grande do Sul) Grêmio	2002 Copa Sul-Minas 4th place
(Pernambuco) Náutico	2002 Copa do Nordeste 3rd place
(São Paulo (state)) Palmeiras	2002 Torneio Rio-São Paulo 3rd place
(Pará) Paysandu	2002 Copa Norte champions
(São Paulo (state)) São Caetano	2002 Torneio Rio-São Paulo 4th place
(São Paulo (state)) São Paulo	2002 Torneio Rio-São Paulo runners-up
(Rio de Janeiro (state)) Vasco da Gama	2002 Torneio Rio-São Paulo 6th place
(Bahia) Vitória	2002 Copa do Nordeste runners-up

== Group stage ==
=== Group A ===
Pos	Team	Pld	W	D	L	GF	GA	GD	Pts	Qualification
1	(Pará) Paysandu (A)	3	1	2	0	4	3	+1	5	Advance to Knockout stage
2	(Rio de Janeiro (state)) Fluminense (A)	3	1	2	0	1	0	+1	5	Advance to Knockout stage
3	(Pernambuco) Náutico	3	0	2	1	3	4	−1	2	
4	(São Paulo (state)) Corinthians	3	0	2	1	2	3	−1	2	

Source: Bola na Área
(A) Advance to a further round

=== Group B ===
Pos	Team	Pld	W	D	L	GF	GA	GD	Pts	Qualification
1	(Rio de Janeiro (state)) Flamengo (A)	3	3	0	0	6	0	+6	9	Advance to Knockout stage
2	Goiás (A)	3	2	0	1	5	6	−1	6	Advance to Knockout stage
3	(São Paulo (state)) São Caetano	3	1	0	2	3	4	−1	3	
4	(Paraná (state)) Atlético Paranaense	3	0	0	3	3	7	−4	0	

Source: Bola na Área
(A) Advance to a further round

=== Group C ===
Pos	Team	Pld	W	D	L	GF	GA	GD	Pts	Qualification
1	(Minas Gerais) Cruzeiro (A)	3	1	2	0	3	2	+1	5	Advance to Knockout stage
2	(Bahia) Vitória (A)	3	1	1	1	2	1	+1	4	Advance to Knockout stage
3	(São Paulo (state)) São Paulo	3	1	1	1	3	3	0	4	
4	(Rio Grande do Sul) Grêmio	3	0	2	1	1	3	−2	2	

Source: Bola na Área
(A) Advance to a further round

=== Group D ===
Pos	Team	Pld	W	D	L	GF	GA	GD	Pts	Qualification
1	(São Paulo (state)) Palmeiras (A)	3	2	1	0	7	2	+5	7	Advance to Knockout stage
2	Bahia (A)	3	2	0	1	4	5	−1	6	Advance to Knockout stage
3	(Rio de Janeiro (state)) Vasco da Gama	3	0	2	1	4	5	−1	2	
4	(Minas Gerais) Atlético Mineiro	3	0	1	2	5	8	−3	1	

Source: Bola na Área
(A) Advance to a further round

== Quarter-finals ==
Team 1	Score	Team 2
Paysandu (Pará)	2–1	Bahia
Palmeiras (São Paulo (state))	1–0	(Rio de Janeiro (state)) Fluminense
Cruzeiro (Minas Gerais)	3–1	Goiás
Flamengo (Rio de Janeiro (state))	2–1	(Bahia) Vitória

== Semi-finals ==
Team 1	Score	Team 2
Paysandu (Pará)	3–1	(São Paulo (state)) Palmeiras
Cruzeiro (Minas Gerais)	2–1	(Rio de Janeiro (state)) Flamengo

== Finals ==
31 July 2002
21:45 UTC−3

Paysandu (Pará)	1–2	(Minas Gerais) Cruzeiro
Sandro Goiano 32'	Report	Fábio Jr. 14'; Joãozinho 63'

Mangueirão, Belém
Attendance: 53,615
Referee: Edílson Pereira de Carvalho

4 August 2002
16:00 UTC−3

Cruzeiro (Minas Gerais)	3–4	(Pará) Paysandu
Fábio Jr. 9', 48'; Cris 39'	Report	Vandick 11', 22', 40'; Jobson 57'
Penalties
Ricardinho (penalty missed); Vander (penalty missed); Jussiê (penalty missed)	0–3	(penalty scored) Jobson; (penalty scored) Vélber; (penalty scored) Luís Fernando

Castelão, Fortaleza
Attendance: 5,719
Referee: Paulo César de Oliveira

Tied 5–5 on aggregate, Paysandu won on penalties.
