= Neném (footballer, born 1975) =

Brazilian footballer

Personal information
- Full name: Dorismar Felipe de Souza
- Date of birth: 25 June 1975 (age 51)
- Place of birth: Bom Jesus do Itabapoana, Brazil
- Height: 1.74 m (5 ft 9 in)
- Position: Defender

Senior career*
Years	Team	Apps	(Gls)
1995–1997	Americano		
1997	União São João		
1997–2003	Palmeiras	88	(6)
1999	→ Goiás (loan)		
2001	→ Cruzeiro (loan)	18	(1)
2002	→ Goiás (loan)		
2003	Santos		
2004	Bahia		
2005	Portuguesa		
2006	Botafogo		
2007–2008	Cardoso Moreira		
2008	Cabofriense		
2008	Aperibeense		
2009	Catanduvense		
2010	Goytacaz		
2011	Rio Branco-RJ		
- * Club domestic league appearances and goals as of 19 January 2024

Dorismar Felipe de Souza (born 25 June 1975), better known as Neném, is a Brazilian former professional footballer who played as a defender.

== Career ==
A defender who played both as a full-back and as a defender, Neném became famous at Palmeiras, at the end of the Parmalat era, where he managed to be part of several titles. He was loaned to Cruzeiro and Goiás, where he was also state champion in 2002. He played for several other clubs, most notably Botafogo, where he was Rio champion in 2006. In 2001 he experienced the unusual situation of having his pass negotiated with Palmeiras for the value of R$ 4.

== Honours ==
Palmeiras

- Copa Mercosur: 1998
- Copa do Brasil: 1998
- Torneio Rio-São Paulo: 2000
- Copa dos Campeões: 2000

Goiás

- Campeonato Goiano: 2002

Botafogo

- Campeonato Carioca: 2006
- Taça Guanabara: 2006
