= Flávio Lopes =

Brazilian footballer (born 1965)

Personal information
- Full name: Flávio Antônio Lopes Lourenço
- Date of birth: 30 July 1965 (age 61)
- Place of birth: Ervália, Brazil
- Height: 1.76 m (5 ft 9 in)
- Position: Midfielder

Youth career
- –1985: Valerio

Senior career*
Years	Team	Apps	(Gls)
1986–1989	Valerio		
1990–1994	América-MG		
1995	América-SP		
1996	Londrina		

Managerial career
- 1999–2000: América-MG
- 2001: Atlético Paranaense
- 2001: América-MG
- 2001: Gama
- 2002: América-MG
- 2003: Ipatinga
- 2003: Portuguesa
- 2004: Marília
- 2005: ABC
- 2006: América-MG
- 2007: Rio Branco-MG
- 2007: Ipatinga
- 2007: Atlético Goianiense
- 2008: Ceará
- 2008–2009: América-MG
- 2009: ABC
- 2009–2010: Ipatinga
- 2010: Villa Nova
- 2011: CRB
- 2012: Remo
- 2012: Ipatinga
- 2013: Araxá
- 2013–2016: América-MG (coordinator)
- 2017: Guarani-MG
- 2019: Goytacaz
- 2021–2023: Nacional de Muriaé (coordinator)
- 2023: União Luziense
- * Club domestic league appearances and goals as of 4 December 2024

Flávio Antônio Lopes Lourenço (born 30 July 1965), better known as Flávio Lopes, is a Brazilian former professional footballer and manager who played as a midfielder.

== Playing career ==
Revealed by Valeriodoce de Itabira, Flávio Lopes gained prominence by being América Mineiro main player in winning the 1993 Campeonato Mineiro. A skilled midfielder, he also played for América de Rio Preto and Londrina before retiring.

== Managerial career ==
Lopes began his career as a coach at América Mineiro, and achieved the feat of also becoming a champion as a manager by winning the 2000 Copa Sul-Minas. This boosted his career, causing Lopes to coach teams from different regions of Brazil in the following years, with emphasis on Athletico Parananense, Gama, ABC and Ipatinga, where he accumulated several spells. He was champion again in 2005, at the state level with ABC, and in the Taça Minas Gerais in a new stint at América Mineiro. From 2012 to 2016 he was football coordinator at América, indirectly participating in the conquest of the 2016 Campeonato Mineiro (led by Givanildo Oliveira), He would still come to coach Goytacaz, Nacional de Muriaé and União Luziense.

In 2024, citing tiredness and lack of time with his family, Lopes announced his retirement as a coach, dedicating himself solely to sports consultancy.

== Honours ==
=== Player ===
América Mineiro

- Campeonato Mineiro: 1993

=== Manager ===
América Mineiro

- Copa Sul Minas: 2000
- Taça Minas Gerais: 2005

ABC

- Campeonato Potiguar: 2005
