= Milagres (footballer) =

Brazilian footballer

Personal information
- Full name: Marco Antônio Gonçalves Milagres
- Date of birth: 23 April 1966 (age 60)
- Place of birth: Juiz de Fora, Brazil
- Height: 1.76 m (5 ft 9 in)
- Position: Goalkeeper

Youth career
- 1985–1987: Flamengo

Senior career*
Years	Team	Apps	(Gls)
1987–1989	Flamengo	12	(0)
1990	América-TR		
1990–1991	Vitória		
1991	Americano		
1991	Moto Club		
1992–2001	América Mineiro	371	(0)
2001	Santa Cruz		
2001–2002	Atlético Mineiro	32	(0)
2003	Uberaba		
2003	Comercial-SP		
2004	Uberlândia		

Managerial career
- 2005: Juventus-MG
- 2011–2017: América Mineiro (youth sectors)
- 2012: América Mineiro (caretaker)
- 2018: Montes Claros
- 2019: Boston City
- 2020: Serranense
- 2020: Patrocinense
- 2021: América-TO
- 2022–2023: North
- 2023: Valerio
- * Club domestic league appearances and goals as of 2 November 2023

Marco Antônio Gonçalves Milagres (born 23 April 1966), better known as Milagres, is a Brazilian former professional footballer and manager who played as a goalkeeper.

== Career ==
Milagres was trained in Flamengo's youth sectors, and remained at the club as a substitute from 1987 to 1989, making only 12 appearances. He had brief spells at América de Três Rios and EC Vitória, until arriving at América Mineiro in 1992. For América Mineiro, Milagres made 371 appearances, the club all-time record, in addition to having won a state title, a Série B and the Copa Sul Minas in 2002. In 2001 he transferred to Santa Cruz, and later, to Atlético Mineiro, where he made 32 appearances. He was Modulo II champion for Uberaba, and also played for Comercial de Ribeirão Preto and Uberlândia EC before retiring.

== Managerial career ==
He began his career at Juventus de Minas Novas in 2005. Afterwards, for years, he was coach of América's youth teams, and in 2012 he received an opportunity in the main team after the departure of Givanildo Oliveira. He also coached Montes Claros EC, América-TO and CA Patrocinense.

In 2022 he was hired by the recently created North EC de Montes Claros, being champion of the Second Division. In June 2023, he as announced by Valeriodoce.

== Personal life ==
His son, Matheus Milagres, is also a professional footballer and later played at América de Teófilo Otoni.

== Honours ==
=== Player ===
Flamengo

- Taça Guanabara: 1988, 1989

América Mineiro

- Copa Sul-Minas: 2001
- Campeonato Brasileiro Série B: 1997
- Campeonato Mineiro: 1993

Uberaba

- Campeonato Mineiro Módulo II: 2003

=== Manager ===
North

- Campeonato Mineiro Segunda Divisão: 2022

America Mineiro U20

- Copa RS: 2011
- Taça BH de Futebol Júnior: 2014
