= 2003 Campeonato Paulista =

Campeonato Paulista - Série A1
- Season: 2003
- Champions: Corinthians (25th title)
- Relegated: Botafogo-SP; Internacional de Limeira
- Matches played: 109
- Goals scored: 360 (3.3 per match)
- Top goalscorer: Luís Fabiano (8 goals)

The 2003 Campeonato Paulista de Futebol Profissional da Primeira Divisão - Série A1 was the 102nd season of São Paulo's top professional football league. Corinthians won the championship for the 25th time. Botafogo-SP and Internacional de Limeira were relegated.

== Format ==
On the first stage, the 21 teams are split in 3 groups with 7 teams each. In each group, every team play against all the other teams in the same group. The first and second teams from each group qualify to the quarterfinals. The two best teams in the overall standings also qualify. The 12 worst teams advance to the relegation tournament.

The quarterfinals are played in one-leg, and the semifinals and the finals are played in two-leg. On the relegation tournament, the twelve teams are split in two groups of six. Each team plays against all the teams in the other group. The worst club in this stage standings is relegated, and the second worst club has to play a relegation playoff match against the runner-up from the second division.

== Participating teams ==
Club	Home city	2002 result
América	São José do Rio Preto	10th
Botafogo-SP	Ribeirão Preto	7th
Corinthians	São Paulo (Tatuapé)	Did not participate
Guarani	Campinas	Did not participate
Internacional de Limeira	Limeira	8th
Ituano	Itu	1st
Juventus	São Paulo (Mooca)	4th
Marília	Marília	1st (2nd division)
Mogi Mirim	Mogi Mirim	6th
Palmeiras	São Paulo (Perdizes)	Did not participate
Paulista	Jundiaí	Did not participate
Ponte Preta	Campinas	Did not participate
Portuguesa	São Paulo (Pari)	Did not participate
Portuguesa Santista	Santos	Did not participate
Rio Branco	Americana	3rd
Santo André	Santo André	5th
Santos	Santos	Did not participate
São Caetano	São Caetano do Sul	Did not participate
São Paulo	São Paulo (Morumbi)	Did not participate
União Barbarense	Santa Bárbara d'Oeste	9th
União São João	Araras	2nd

== First stage ==
=== Group 1 ===
Pos	Team	Pld	W	D	L	GF	GA	GD	Pts	Qualification	UBA	GUA	PAL	RIO	ITU	PON	MOG
1	União Barbarense (Q)	6	4	1	1	11	8	+3	13	Qualifies to the Semifinals							
2	Guarani (Q)	6	4	0	2	11	7	+4	12	Qualifies to the Semifinals							
3	Palmeiras (Q)	6	3	2	1	11	9	+2	11	Qualifies to the Semifinals							
4	Rio Branco	6	2	3	1	12	9	+3	9								
5	Ituano	6	2	0	4	9	12	−3	6								
6	Ponte Preta	6	1	1	4	8	12	−4	4								
7	Mogi Mirim	6	1	1	4	7	12	−5	4								

Rules for classification: 1) points; 2) goal difference; 3) number of goals scored.
(Q) Qualified for the phase indicated

=== Group 2 ===
Pos	Team	Pld	W	D	L	GF	GA	GD	Pts	Qualification	PSA	SPO	STA	STO	PAU	ILI	JUV
1	Portuguesa Santista (Q)	6	5	1	0	15	2	+13	16	Qualifies to the Semifinals							
2	São Paulo (Q)	6	3	2	1	15	6	+9	11	Qualifies to the Semifinals							
3	Santo André (Q)	6	3	2	1	9	6	+3	11	Qualifies to the Semifinals							
4	Santos	6	3	1	2	12	9	+3	10								
5	Paulista	6	2	1	3	9	12	−3	7								
6	Internacional de Limeira	6	1	1	4	7	21	−14	4								
7	Juventus	6	0	0	6	5	16	−11	0								

Rules for classification: 1) points; 2) goal difference; 3) number of goals scored.
(Q) Qualified for the phase indicated

=== Group 3 ===
Pos	Team	Pld	W	D	L	GF	GA	GD	Pts	Qualification	SCA	COR	AME	POR	UNI	BOT	MAR
1	São Caetano (Q)	6	6	0	0	16	2	+14	18	Qualifies to the Semifinals							
2	Corinthians (Q)	6	4	1	1	12	7	+5	13	Qualifies to the Semifinals							
3	América-SP	6	3	1	2	11	8	+3	10								
4	Portuguesa	6	2	2	2	8	10	−2	8								
5	União São João	6	1	1	4	5	11	−6	4								
6	Botafogo-SP	6	0	3	3	5	11	−6	3								
7	Marília	6	0	2	4	11	19	−8	2								

Rules for classification: 1) points; 2) goal difference; 3) number of goals scored.
(Q) Qualified for the phase indicated

== Relegation tournament ==
=== Group A ===
Pos	Team	Pld	W	D	L	GF	GA	GD	Pts
1	América-SP	6	4	0	2	12	9	+3	12
2	Marília	6	3	3	0	10	4	+6	12
3	Mogi Mirim	6	2	3	1	12	10	+2	9
4	Ituano	6	2	2	2	10	8	+2	8
5	Portuguesa	6	2	2	2	12	12	0	8
6	Inter de Limeira	6	0	1	5	3	12	−9	1

Rules for classification: 1) points; 2) goal difference; 3) number of goals scored.

=== Group B ===
Pos	Team	Pld	W	D	L	GF	GA	GD	Pts
1	Ponte Preta	6	3	3	0	12	8	+4	12
2	Paulista	6	3	1	2	15	9	+6	10
3	União São João	6	2	2	2	5	7	−2	8
4	Juventus	6	2	1	3	5	8	−3	7
5	Rio Branco	6	1	3	2	8	11	−3	6
6	Botafogo-SP	6	1	1	4	10	16	−6	4

Rules for classification: 1) points; 2) goal difference; 3) number of goals scored.

== Relegation playoff ==
The team with the second worst campaign plays against the runner-up from the second division of the state championship.

April 02, 2003
19:30 UTC−03:00

Atlético Sorocaba	2–1	Botafogo-SP

Estádio Municipal Walter Ribeiro, Sorocaba

April 05, 2003
19:30 UTC−03:00

Botafogo-SP	0–0	Atlético Sorocaba

Estádio Santa Cruz, Ribeirão Preto

Atlético Sorocaba is promoted to the state championship's first division, and Botafogo-SP is relegated to the second division.

== Final stage ==
=== Quarterfinals ===
February 26, 2003
21:00 UTC−03:00

Corinthians	2–1	União Barbarense
Liédson 26'; Fábio Luciano 68'		Gilson Batata 25'

Estádio do Pacaembu, São Paulo

February 26, 2003
21:00 UTC−03:00

São Caetano	0–2	Palmeiras
		Thiago Gentil 53', 87'

Estádio Anacleto Campanella, São Paulo

February 27, 2003
20:30 UTC−03:00

Portuguesa Santista	0–0	Guarani

Estádio Ulrico Mursa, Santos

February 27, 2003
20:30 UTC−03:00

São Paulo	4–2	Santo André
Itamar 24', 58', 64'; Maldonado 52'		Romerito 43'; Aílton 60'

Estádio do Morumbi, São Paulo

=== Semifinals ===
==== First leg ====
March 03, 2003
21:00 UTC−03:00

Palmeiras	2–2	Corinthians
Adãozinho 15'; Neném 34'		Anderson 68'; Liédson 77'

Estádio do Morumbi, São Paulo

March 06, 2003
21:00 UTC−03:00

São Paulo	5–0	Portuguesa Santista
Júlio Baptista 27'; Luís Fabiano 35', 40', 62'; Itamar 85'

Estádio do Morumbi, São Paulo

==== Second leg ====
March 08, 2003
18:00 UTC−03:00

Corinthians	4–2	Palmeiras
Liédson 9'; Gil 11', 15'; Rogério 41'		Fabrício 21' (o.g.); Muñoz 61'

Estádio do Morumbi, São Paulo

March 09, 2003
11:00 UTC−03:00

Portuguesa Santista	0–1	São Paulo
		Luís Fabiano 72'

Vila Belmiro, Santos

=== Finals ===
March 16, 2003
18:00 UTC−03:00

Corinthians	3–2	São Paulo
Rogério 29'; Fábio Luciano 68'; Gil 83'		Luís Fabiano 33'; Reinaldo 76'

Estádio do Morumbi, São Paulo
Attendance: 46,633
Referee: Cléber Wellington Abade

March 22, 2003
18:00 UTC−03:00

São Paulo	2–3	Corinthians
Luís Fabiano 49'; Fabiano 62'		Liédson 21'; Jorge Wágner 45+2', 88'

Estádio do Morumbi, São Paulo
Attendance: 71,732
Referee: Sálvio Spínola Fagundes Filho
