= Vélber =

Brazilian footballer

Personal information
- Full name: Vélber Augusto Pantoja Conceição
- Date of birth: 20 May 1975 (age 51)
- Place of birth: Belém, Brazil
- Height: 1.69 m (5 ft 7 in)
- Position: Midfielder

Senior career*
Years	Team	Apps	(Gls)
1997–2000	Tuna Luso		
1997	→ Paraná (loan)		
2001	Remo		
2002–2003	Paysandu	72	(19)
2004–2007	São Paulo	59	(3)
2006	→ Fortaleza (loan)		
2006	→ Ponte Preta (loan)		
2007	→ América-SP (loan)		
2007	→ Remo (loan)		
2008	Itumbiara		
2009	Paysandu	8	(1)
2009	Remo	8	(3)
2010	América-RN	14	(1)
2011	Luverdense		
2011	São Raimundo-PA		
2012	Rio Verde		
2013	Cametá		
2016	Paysandu	3	(1)
- * Club domestic league appearances and goals as of 30 August 2023

Vélber Augusto Pantoja Conceição (born 20 May 1975), simply known as Vélber, is a Brazilian former professional footballer who played as a midfielder.

== Career ==
A native of Pará, Vélber achieved national projection together with the Paysandu roster from 2002 to 2003, awakening the interest of big clubs such as Boca Juniors and São Paulo, to which he transferred. After his time at São Paulo, he played for several clubs until he ended his career at Paysandu, where he is considered one of the greatest idols.

== Personal life ==
In 2015, he was arrested for non-payment of child support. He currently has his own futsal team (AE Panelinha) in the city of Belém.

== Honours ==
Paysandu

- Campeonato Paraense: 2001, 2009
- Copa Norte: 2002
- Copa dos Campeões: 2002
- Copa Verde: 2016

São Paulo

- Campeonato Paulista: 2005
- Copa Libertadores: 2005

Itumbiara

- Campeonato Goiano: 2008
