= América Futebol Clube (MG) =

Traditional Brazilian football team from Belo Horizonte, Minas Gerais

América Mineiro
- Full name: América Futebol Clube
- Nickname: Coelho (Rabbit)
- Founded: 30 April 1912; 114 years ago
- Ground: Arena Independência
- Capacity: 23,018
- SAF Owner: América Futebol Clube (MG) (100%)
- President: Alencar da Silveira
- Head coach: Roger
- League: Campeonato Brasileiro Série B Campeonato Mineiro
- 2025 2025: Série B, 14th of 20; Mineiro, 2nd of 12
- Website: www.americafc.com.br
| Home colors | Away colors |

América Futebol Clube, commonly referred to as simply América Mineiro, is a Brazilian football team from the city of Belo Horizonte, capital city of the Brazilian state of Minas Gerais. Founded in 1912, the club preserves its name and crest since its inception. The original home kit colours are white and green only; the black color was incorporated in the 1970s. The team also played with a red home kit between 1933 and 1942, as a protest to the introduction of professionalism. It hosts its matches at Independência stadium. The club has the third largest fan base among the teams from Minas Gerais.

América is one of the most traditional and successful teams from Minas Gerais. It has won the state championship 16 times, and finished as runners-up in another 16 occasions. The first 10 victories were in a row, between 1916 and 1925, being the national record of successive accomplishments (together with ABC); the most recent was in 2016. Other major accomplishments were the Brazilian Second Division in 1997 and 2017, South-Minas Cup in 2000, and Brazilian Third Division in 2009.

The club has a long reputation in forming young talents in football. Among others, it has revealed the world-class players Tostão, Éder Aleixo, Yuji Nakazawa, Gilberto Silva, Fred, Danilo and Richarlison. América has won the three most important junior tournaments in Brazil: São Paulo Juniors Cup (1996), Brazilian Championship U-20 (2011) and Belo Horizonte Juniors Cup (2000 and 2014).

== History ==
On 30 April 1912, a group of young men who played football purely for the love of the game decided to turn their team into a football club. In the first meeting, the founders decided that the name of the club would be América Foot-Ball Club, and the colors would be green and white. The first matches were played on the mayor's field. In 1913, América and Minas Gerais Futebol Clube fused, and the club changed its colors to green, white and black. Between 1916 and 1925, the team won ten state championships in a row.

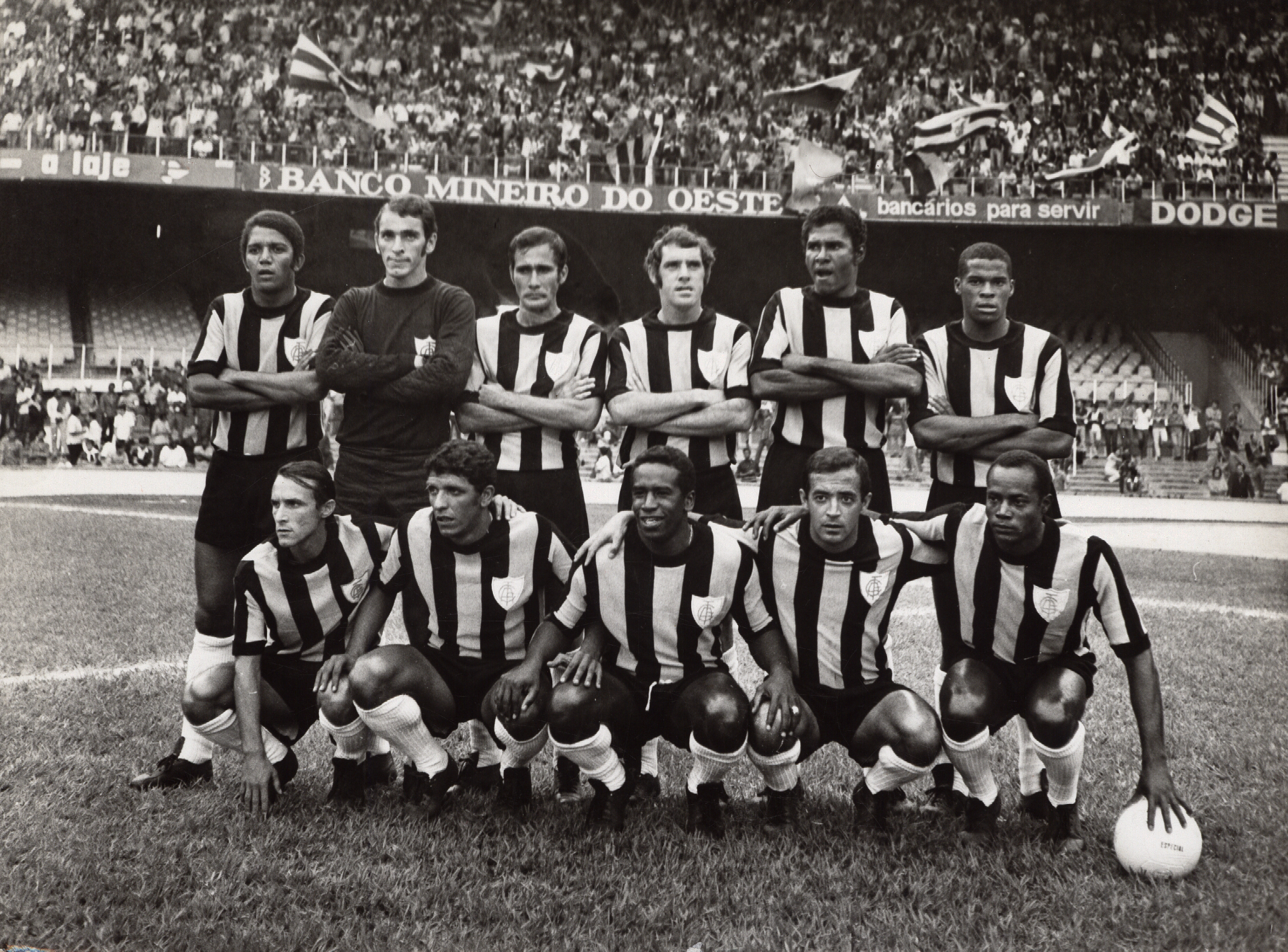
América's team, 1971. National Archives of Brazil.

In 1933, as a protest to the professionalization of Brazilian football, the club changed its colors to red and white. In 1943, the club professionalized its football division, and returned to its previous colors. In 1948, América won its first state championship as a professional club.

In 1997, América won the Série B for the first time, and in 2000, the club won the Copa Sul-Minas first edition, beating Cruzeiro in the final. In 2004, after a poor performance in the Série B, América was relegated to the Campeonato Brasileiro Série C, and in 2007, the club finished in Campeonato Mineiro's last position, and was relegated to the following year's Campeonato Mineiro Módulo II. América won the Série C in 2009, beating ASA in the final. The following year, the team was fourth at Série B and returned to the top level of the Brazilian championship after ten years. On 14 June 2013, América signed a cooperation contract with the Tahitian Football Federation to develop under-20 national players.

== Symbols ==
The club's official anthem was composed by Vicente Motta. There are also two other anthems: The unofficial anthem, which was composed by Fernando Brant and Tavinho Moura, and the supporters' anthem, whose lyrics were composed by Márcio Vianna Dias and sung by Fernando Ângelo. América's mascot was created by the cartoonist Fernando Pierucetti, and is a red-eyed white cartoon rabbit with clearly protruding teeth.

== Derbies ==
América's greatest rivals are Cruzeiro and Atlético Mineiro. The derby between América and Atlético Mineiro is known as O Clássico das Multidões (The Derby of the Masses), and was first played on 15 November 1913, in a friendly game that ended in a 1–1 draw.

== Honours ==
=== Official tournaments ===
National
| Competitions | Titles | Seasons |
|---|---|---|
| Campeonato Brasileiro Série B | 2 | 1997, 2017 |
| Campeonato Brasileiro Série C | 1 | 2009 |
Regional
| Competitions | Titles | Seasons |
| Copa Sul-Minas | 1 | 2000 |
State
| Competitions | Titles | Seasons |
| Campeonato Mineiro | 16 | 1916, 1917, 1918, 1919, 1920, 1921, 1922, 1923, 1924, 1925, 1948, 1957, 1971, 1993, 2001, 2016 |
| Taça Minas Gerais | 1 | 2005 |
| Campeonato Mineiro Módulo II | 1 | 2008 |

=== Others tournaments ===
==== International ====
- Trofeo Ciudad de Córdoba (1): 1991.
- Maribor Mini Tournament (1): 1999 Sub 20

==== National ====
- Torneio Quadrangular de Belo Horizonte (2): 1948, 1953
- Triangular de Belo Horizonte (3): 1955, 1956, 1964
- Quadrangular de Juiz de Fora (1): 1957
- Torneio Preliminar do Torneio Centro-Sul (1): 1968

==== State ====
- Torneio Início do Campeonato Mineiro (13): 1917, 1918, 1919, 1920, 1921, 1924, 1925, 1927, 1933, 1936, 1945, 1955, 1957

==== City ====
- Campeonato Extra da Cidade de BH (1): 1939

=== Runners-up ===
- Campeonato Brasileiro Série B (1): 2020
- Campeonato Brasileiro Série C (1): 1990
- Campeonato Mineiro (17): 1927, 1930, 1939, 1949, 1958, 1959, 1961, 1964, 1965, 1973, 1992, 1995, 1999, 2012, 2021, 2023, 2025
- Taça Minas Gerais (4): 1977, 1980, 1984, 2008

=== Youth team ===
- Copa São Paulo de Futebol Júnior (1): 1996
- Taça Belo Horizonte de Juniores (2): 2000, 2014
- Copa Rio Grande do Sul de Futebol Sub-20 (1): 2011

== Current squad ==
As of 1 October 2026

Note: Flags indicate national team as defined under FIFA eligibility rules; some limited exceptions apply. Players may hold more than one non-FIFA nationality.

| No. | Pos. | Nation | Player |
|---|---|---|---|
| 1 | GK | BRA | Gustavo |
| 2 | DF | BRA | Emerson Santos |
| 3 | DF | ARG | Luca Sosa |
| 4 | DF | BRA | Rafa Barcelos |
| 5 | MF | ARG | Fernando Elizari |
| 6 | MF | BRA | Gabriel Domingos |
| 7 | FW | BRA | Guilherme Parede |
| 8 | MF | BRA | Felipe Amaral |
| 9 | FW | BRA | Willian Bigode |
| 13 | DF | BRA | Heitor |
| 15 | DF | BRA | Alex Silva |
| 16 | MF | BRA | Alê |
| 17 | FW | URU | Gonzalo Mastriani (on loan from Athletico Paranaense) |
| 19 | GK | BRA | William |
| 20 | FW | BRA | Paulo Victor (on loan from Chaves) |

| No. | Pos. | Nation | Player |
|---|---|---|---|
| 21 | MF | BRA | Eduardo Person |
| 25 | DF | ARG | Tobias Ostchega |
| 26 | DF | BRA | Manoel |
| 27 | GK | BRA | Cássio |
| 31 | DF | BRA | Fábio |
| 44 | DF | BRA | Thallyson |
| 45 | DF | BRA | Ricardo Silva (captain) |
| 52 | GK | BRA | Ítalo Brito |
| 55 | MF | BRA | Otávio Gonçalves |
| 77 | FW | PAR | Matías Segovia (on loan from Botafogo) |
| 88 | MF | BRA | Gustavo Barreto |
| 91 | GK | BRA | Bruno Brígido |
| 93 | MF | PAR | Jorge Jiménez |
| 97 | MF | BRA | Val Soares |
| 99 | FW | BRA | Marcelo Maçola |

=== Youth team ===
Note: Flags indicate national team as defined under FIFA eligibility rules; some limited exceptions apply. Players may hold more than one non-FIFA nationality.

| No. | Pos. | Nation | Player |
|---|---|---|---|
| 28 | DF | BRA | Kappel |
| 37 | MF | BRA | Julio César |
| 62 | DF | BRA | Biel Silva |

| No. | Pos. | Nation | Player |
|---|---|---|---|
| 80 | FW | BRA | Pedro Paranhos |
| — | FW | BRA | Kaique Zizero |

=== Out on loan ===
Note: Flags indicate national team as defined under FIFA eligibility rules; some limited exceptions apply. Players may hold more than one non-FIFA nationality.

| No. | Pos. | Nation | Player |
|---|---|---|---|
| 10 | MF | BRA | Yago Souza (at Al-Fayha until 30 June 2027) |
| 12 | DF | BRA | Samuel Alves (at Uberlândia until 1 December 2026) |

| No. | Pos. | Nation | Player |
|---|---|---|---|
| — | MF | BRA | Jhonatan Lima (at Uberlândia until 1 December 2026) |

=== First-team staff ===
| Position | Name | Nationality |
|---|---|---|
| Head coach | Roger Silva | Brazil |
| Assistant manager | Renato Gheller | Brazil |
| Assistant manager | Eduardo Abdo | Brazil |
| Fitness coach | Diogo Evaristo | Brazil |
| Fitness coach | Guilherme Oliveira | Brazil |
| Fitness coach | João Paulo | Brazil |
| Goalkeeping coach | Tales Superbi | Brazil |
| Goalkeeping coach | Everton Coelho | Brazil |

== Notable players ==
- (Brazil) Álvaro Santos
- (Brazil) Claudinei
- (Brazil) Danilo
- (Brazil) Éder Aleixo
- (Brazil) Esio Vieira
- (Brazil) Euller
- (Brazil) Fred
- (Brazil) Gilberto
- (Brazil) Gilberto Silva
- (Brazil) Jair Bala
- (Brazil) Juca Show
- (Brazil) Milagres
- (Brazil) Palhinha
- (Brazil) Richarlison
- (Brazil) Satyro Tabuada
- (Brazil) Spencer Coelho
- (Brazil) Toninho Cerezo
- (Brazil) Tostão
- (Brazil) William Morais
- (Argentina) Mauro Zárate
- (Colombia) Orlando Berrío
- (Japan) Yuji Nakazawa

== Notable managers ==
- (Brazil) Carlos Alberto Silva
- (Brazil) Flávio Lopes
- (Brazil) Givanildo Oliveira
- (Brazil) Paulo Comelli
- (Brazil) Yustrich
- (Brazil) Lisca Doido

== See also ==
- América Futebol Clube (MG) (women)
