= Pedro Paranhos =

Brazilian footballer (born 2006)

Personal information
- Full name: Pedro Geovane Paranhos Santos
- Date of birth: 12 October 2006 (age 20)
- Place of birth: Brazil
- Position: Forward

Team information
- Current team: Atlético Goianiense

Youth career
- 2021–2023: Nacional-SP
- 2023–: Atlético Goianiense

Senior career*
Years	Team	Apps	(Gls)
2024–	Atlético Goianiense	1	(0)
- * Club domestic league appearances and goals as of 21:38, 23 October 2024 (UTC)

Pedro Geovane Paranhos Santos (born 12 October 2006), known as Pedro Paranhos or Geovane, is a Brazilian professional footballer who plays as a forward for Atlético Goianiense.

== Career ==
Paranhos joined Atlético Goianiense's youth sides in 2023, from Nacional-SP. He made his first team – and Série A – debut on 18 October 2024, coming on as a late substitute for Janderson in a 0–0 home draw against Cuiabá.

== Career statistics ==
As of 23 October 2024

Club	Season	League			State League		Cup		Continental		Other		Total	
Club	Season	Division	Apps	Goals	Apps	Goals	Apps	Goals	Apps	Goals	Apps	Goals	Apps	Goals
Atlético Goianiense	2024	Série A	1	0	0	0	0	0	—		—		1	0
Career total			1	0	0	0	0	0	0	0	0	0	1	0
