= Milagres Church =

Milagres Church may refer to:

- Milagres Church (Kallianpur), a Catholic church in Kallianpur
- Milagres Church (Mangalore), a Catholic church in Mangalore
