= Gil (footballer, born 1980) =

Brazilian footballer

Personal information
- Full name: Gilberto Ribeiro Gonçalves
- Date of birth: 13 September 1980 (age 46)
- Place of birth: Andradina, Brazil
- Height: 1.72 m (5 ft 7 1/2 in)
- Position: Forward

Youth career
- 1995–1999: Corinthians

Senior career*
Years	Team	Apps	(Gls)
2000–2005	Corinthians	124	(31)
2005	Tokyo Verdy	16	(2)
2006	Cruzeiro	14	(3)
2006–2007	Gimnàstic	19	(0)
2007–2009	Internacional	14	(1)
2008	→ Botafogo (loan)	17	(1)
2009–2010	Flamengo	2	(0)
2014	ABC	0	(0)
2015	Juventus-SP	21	(8)

International career^{‡}
2003	Brazil	4	(1)
- * Club domestic league appearances and goals as of 17 May 2015 ‡ National team caps and goals as of 30 May 2010

Gilberto Ribeiro Gonçalves (born 13 September 1980 in Andradina), commonly known as Gil (Portuguese pronunciation: [ˈʒiw]) is a Brazilian former footballer who played as a forward. He was formally a Brazilian international.

== Club career ==
=== Early years ===
Gil grew up in a small town, Andradina, where his talent was recognised at a very early age. He was noticed by Corinthians scouts at the age 15, and soon went on to join as a youth player.

=== Corinthians ===
His time at Corinthians was relatively successful, with Gil managing to register 31 goals in 124 games, a decent record for a winger. His pace, skill, technical ability, control and ability to beat his man shone in the Brazilian league, but after five years with the Corinthians first team, he transferred to Tokyo Verdy 1969 of Japan, in 2005.

=== Tokyo Verdy ===
His time in Japan was very unsuccessful, with Gil not being a regular starter and not playing to his full potential, which in turn led him to be sold to Brazilian team Cruzeiro, in 2006.

=== Cruzeiro ===
He did not present his best football while in Cruzeiro. Only scoring four goals in over fifteen appearances. He did however start in the majority of the games and became a reliable source for assisting other players for goals.

=== Gimnàstic de Tarragona ===
His season long stay in Tarragona was yet another unsuccessful venture for Gil. Gil played 19 matches and he did not score any goals, during his time with Gimnàstic de Tarragona.

=== Flamengo ===
On 25 September 2009 Flamengo have signed the forward until December 2009.

== International career ==
Gil appeared for the Brazil national football team in the 2003 FIFA Confederations Cup.

== Career statistics ==
=== Club ===
Club performance			League	
Season	Club	League	Apps	Goals
Brazil			League	
1999	Corinthians Paulista	Série A	0	0
2000	Corinthians Paulista	Série A	8	2
2001	Corinthians Paulista	Série A	12	6
2002	Corinthians Paulista	Série A	23	4
2003	Corinthians Paulista	Série A	31	9
2004	Corinthians Paulista	Série A	40	6
2005	Corinthians Paulista	Série A	4	1
Japan			League	
2005	Tokyo Verdy	J1 League	16	2
Brazil			League	
2006	Cruzeiro	Série A	14	3
Spain			League	
2006–07	Gimnàstic Tarragona	La Liga	19	0
Brazil			League	
2007	Internacional	Série A	12	1
2008	Internacional	Série A	3	0
2008	Botafogo	Série A	16	1
2009	Flamengo	Série A	1	0
2010	Flamengo	Série A		
Country	Brazil		164	33
Country	Japan		16	2
Country	Spain		19	0
Total			199	35

=== International ===
Brazil national team
Year	Apps	Goals
2003	4	1
Total	4	1

== Honours ==
=== Club ===
- São Paulo's Cup (U 20): 1999
- São Paulo State League: 1999, 2001, 2003
- Tournament Rio – São Paulo: 2002
- Brazilian Cup: 2002
- Minas Gerais State League: 2006
- Brazilian Série A: 2009

=== Individual honours ===
- Brazilian Bola de Prata (Placar): 2002

== Meme[edit] ==
Gil became famous in Brazil for an interview in 2006 following Cruzeiro, his club at the time, winning the Campeonato Mineiro title. He was asked by Amaral Júnior, a reporter for catholic radio station Rádio Divinópolis, if there were limits to supporters celebrating the title with players, since supporters had invaded the pitch and tore the shirts of some players while celebrating. Live on radio, Gil responded "Só não vale dar o cu, o resto vale tudo" which has homossexual connotation.
