= 2002 Copa Norte =

6th edition of a Brazilian association football competition

Tournament details
- Country: Brazil
- Dates: 20 January – 28 April
- Teams: 16

Final positions
- Champions: (Pará) Paysandu (1st title)
- Runners-up: (Amazonas (Brazilian state)) São Raimundo

Tournament statistics
- Matches played: 74
- Goals scored: 214 (2.89 per match)
- Top goal scorer(s): (Brazil) Lecheva (8 goals)

The 2002 Copa Norte was the 6th edition of a football competition held in Brazil. Featuring 16 clubs, Amazonas have three vacancies; Amapá, Maranhão, Pará, Piauí, Rondônia and Roraima with two each; and Acre with one.

In the finals, Paysandu defeated São Raimundo 4–0 on aggregate to win their first title and earn the right to play in the 2002 Copa dos Campeões.

== Qualified teams ==
Association	Team	Qualification method
(Acre (state)) Acre; 1 berth	Vasco de Rio Branco	2001 Campeonato Acreano champions
(Amapá) Amapá; 2 berths	Independente	2001 Campeonato Amapaense champions
(Amapá) Amapá; 2 berths	São José	2001 Campeonato Amapaense runners-up
(Amazonas (Brazilian state)) Amazonas; 3 berths	Rio Negro	2001 Campeonato Amazonense champions
(Amazonas (Brazilian state)) Amazonas; 3 berths	Nacional	2001 Campeonato Amazonense runners-up
(Amazonas (Brazilian state)) Amazonas; 3 berths	São Raimundo	2001 Campeonato Amazonense 3rd place
(Maranhão) Maranhão; 2 berths	Moto Club	2001 Campeonato Maranhense champions
(Maranhão) Maranhão; 2 berths	Sampaio Corrêa	2001 Campeonato Maranhense runners-up
(Pará) Pará; 2 berths	Paysandu	2001 Campeonato Paraense champions
(Pará) Pará; 2 berths	Remo	2001 Campeonato Paraense runners-up
(Piauí) Piauí; 2 berths	River	2001 Campeonato Piauiense champions
(Piauí) Piauí; 2 berths	Oeiras	2001 Campeonato Piauiense runners-up
(Rondônia) Rondônia; 2 berths	Ji-Paraná	2001 Campeonato Rondoniense champions
(Rondônia) Rondônia; 2 berths	União Cacoalense	2001 Campeonato Rondoniense runners-up
(Roraima) Roraima; 2 berths	Atlético Roraima	2001 Campeonato Roraimense champions
(Roraima) Roraima; 2 berths	Baré	2001 Campeonato Roraimense 4th place

== First stage ==
=== Group A ===
Pos	Team	Pld	W	D	L	GF	GA	GD	Pts	Qualification
1	Atlético Roraima (A)	6	4	0	2	9	6	+3	12	Advance to Second stage
2	(Amazonas (Brazilian state)) São Raimundo (A)	6	3	1	2	13	10	+3	10	Advance to Second stage
3	(Amazonas (Brazilian state)) Rio Negro	6	3	0	3	10	13	−3	9	
4	(Roraima) Baré	6	1	1	4	6	9	−3	4	

Source: Bola na Área
(A) Advance to a further round

=== Group B ===
Pos	Team	Pld	W	D	L	GF	GA	GD	Pts	Qualification
1	(Pará) Paysandu (A)	6	3	3	0	11	3	+8	12	Advance to Second stage
2	(Pará) Remo (A)	6	3	2	1	10	6	+4	11	Advance to Second stage
3	(Amapá) Independente	6	2	1	3	6	14	−8	7	
4	(Amapá) São José	6	0	2	4	4	8	−4	2	

Source: Bola na Área
(A) Advance to a further round

=== Group C ===
Pos	Team	Pld	W	D	L	GF	GA	GD	Pts	Qualification
1	(Piauí) River (A)	6	4	2	0	12	6	+6	14	Advance to Second stage
2	(Maranhão) Moto Club (A)	6	2	2	2	10	8	+2	8	Advance to Second stage
3	(Maranhão) Sampaio Corrêa	6	1	3	2	7	8	−1	6	
4	(Piauí) Oeiras	6	1	1	4	3	10	−7	4	

Source: Bola na Área
(A) Advance to a further round

=== Group D ===
Pos	Team	Pld	W	D	L	GF	GA	GD	Pts	Qualification
1	(Rondônia) Ji-Paraná (A)	6	3	2	1	13	7	+6	11	Advance to Second stage
2	(Amazonas (Brazilian state)) Nacional (A)	6	3	1	2	10	6	+4	10	Advance to Second stage
3	(Rondônia) União Cacoalense	6	1	4	1	10	14	−4	7	
4	(Acre (state)) Vasco de Rio Branco	6	0	3	3	6	12	−6	3	

Source: Bola na Área
(A) Advance to a further round

== Second stage ==
=== Group E ===
Pos	Team	Pld	W	D	L	GF	GA	GD	Pts	Qualification
1	(Amazonas (Brazilian state)) São Raimundo (A)	6	4	1	1	14	8	+6	13	Advance to the Finals
2	(Rondônia) Ji-Paraná	6	3	1	2	9	8	+1	10	
3	(Amazonas (Brazilian state)) Nacional	6	1	3	2	9	9	0	6	
4	Atlético Roraima	6	1	1	4	8	15	−7	4	

Source: Bola na Área
(A) Advance to a further round

=== Group F ===
Pos	Team	Pld	W	D	L	GF	GA	GD	Pts	Qualification
1	(Pará) Paysandu (A)	6	4	0	2	12	6	+6	12	Advance to the Finals
2	(Pará) Remo	6	3	1	2	7	6	+1	10	
3	(Maranhão) Moto Club	6	2	1	3	6	7	−1	7	
4	(Piauí) River	6	1	2	3	5	11	−6	5	

Source: Bola na Área
(A) Advance to a further round

== Finals ==
21 April 2002
16:00 UTC−4

São Raimundo (Amazonas (Brazilian state))	0–1	(Pará) Paysandu
	Report	Zé Augusto 12'

Vivaldão, Manaus
Referee: Álvaro Azeredo Quelhas

28 April 2002
16:00 UTC−3

Paysandu (Pará)	3–0	(Amazonas (Brazilian state)) São Raimundo
Lecheva 20' (pen.), 75'; Sandro Goiano 58'	Report

Estádio da Curuzu, Belém
Referee: Wagner Tardelli de Azevedo

Paysandu won 4–0 on aggregate.
