= Copa Sul-Minas =

- Founded: 2000
- Region: Brazil
- Teams: Vary (include the number of participating teams)

Copa Sul-Minas was a Brazilian football competition that ran between 2000 and 2002, with teams from the three Southern states of Brazil, plus the Southeastern state of Minas Gerais. It is a successor competition to the 1999 Tournament called Copa Sul which only included teams from the Southern states. In 2016, a successor to this tournament was created, the Primeira Liga (also known as Copa Sul-Minas-Rio).

In its three editions, Copa Sul-Minas was won by Minas Gerais teams.

== List of finals ==
=== Copa Sul ===
Year
Year	Winners	Score	Runners-up
1999	(Rio Grande do Sul); Grêmio	2 – 1; 0 – 2; 1 – 0	(Paraná (state)); Paraná

=== Copa Sul-Minas ===
Year	Finals			Semi-finalists	
Year	Winners	Score	Runners-up	Semi-finalists	
2000	(Minas Gerais); América	1 – 0; 2 – 1	(Minas Gerais); Cruzeiro	(Paraná (state)); Athletico-PR	(Paraná (state)); Paraná
2001	(Minas Gerais); Cruzeiro	2 – 0; 3 – 0	(Paraná (state)); Coritiba	(Minas Gerais); Atlético-MG	(Rio Grande do Sul); Grêmio
2002	(Minas Gerais); Cruzeiro	2 – 1; 1 – 0	(Paraná (state)); Athletico-PR	(Rio Grande do Sul); Grêmio	(Minas Gerais); Atlético-MG

== Records and statistics ==
=== Top scorers ===
Year	Player	Club	Goals
1999	Christian	Internacional	8
2000	Kléber Pereira	Atlético Paranaense	6
2001	Guilherme	Atlético Mineiro	8
2002	Liédson	Coritiba	14

=== Winning managers ===
Year	Manager	Club
1999	Celso Roth	Grêmio
2000	Flávio Lopes	América Mineiro
2001	Luiz Felipe Scolari	Cruzeiro
2002	Marco Aurélio	Cruzeiro

== See also ==
- Primeira Liga (Brazil)
