= Copa dos Campeões =

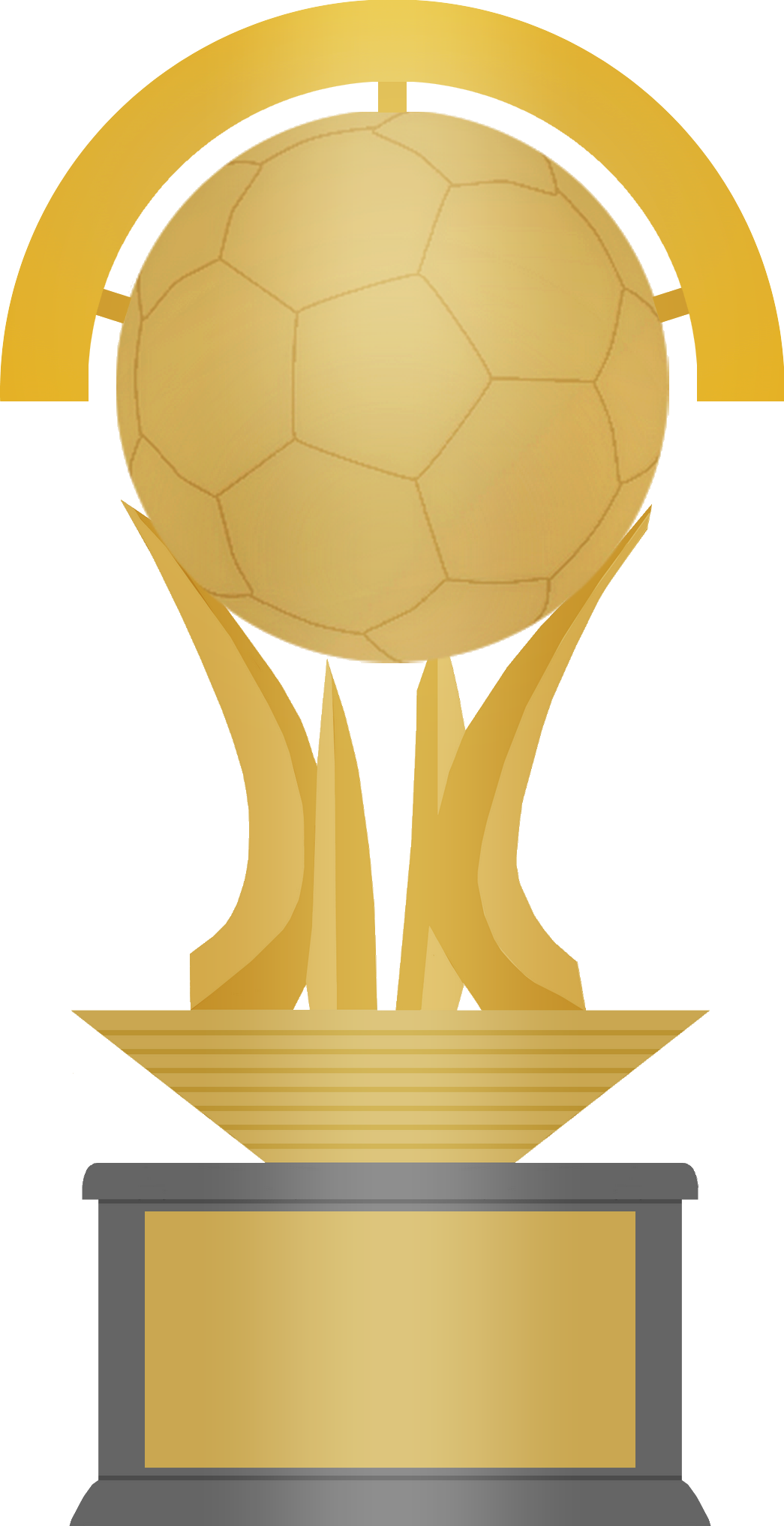
- Organising body: Brazilian Football Confederation
- Founded: 2000
- Abolished: 2002
- Region: Brazil
- Number of teams: 9 (2000, 2001); 16 (2002)
- Most successful club(s): (Rio de Janeiro (state)) Flamengo (São Paulo (state)) Palmeiras (Pará) Paysandu (1 title each)

Copa dos Campeões (Portuguese for Brazilian Champions Cup) was a Brazilian football competition, organized by the Brazilian Football Confederation (CBF), contested by the best teams from each one of the regional cups.

The Copa dos Campeões winner was automatically qualified to following year's Copa Libertadores.

In 1968, Grêmio Maringá won a similar competition, named Torneio dos Campeões da CBD.

== Regional cups ==
These were the regional cups that granted qualification to the Copa dos Campeões:

- Campeonato do Nordeste
- Copa Centro-Oeste
- Copa Norte
- Copa Sul-Minas
- Torneio Rio-São Paulo

== Format ==
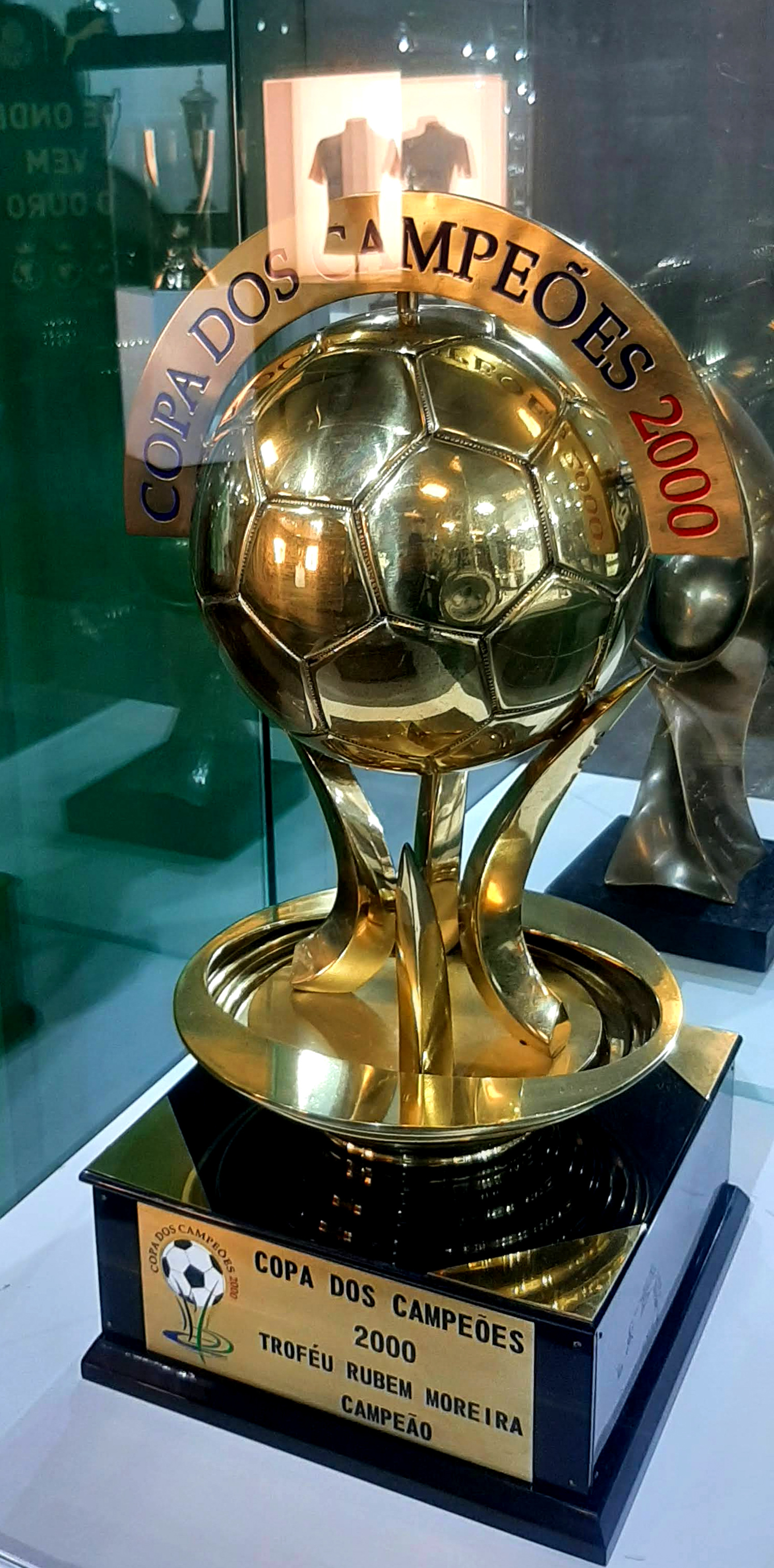
2000 edition trophy.

In 2000, and in 2001, the competition was contested by eight clubs, in a two-leg playoff system. There was a preliminary stage called triangular, disputed by the champions of Copa Centro-Oeste and Copa Norte, and the Campeonato do Nordeste runner-up. Those teams played against each other once, and the two best teams qualified to the first stage.

In 2002, the competition was contested by sixteen clubs. In the first stage, the clubs were divided in four groups of four teams each. The two best placed clubs of each group qualified to the quarterfinals, which was disputed in two legs. The semifinals were disputed in one leg, and the final was disputed in two legs. All matches were played in cities located in Northeastern and Northern cities.

== List of champions ==
Year	Finals			Losing semi-finalists^{1}	
Year	Winners	Score	Runners-up	Losing semi-finalists^{1}	
2000	(São Paulo (state)); Palmeiras	2–1	(Pernambuco); Sport	(Rio de Janeiro (state)); Flamengo	(São Paulo (state)); São Paulo
2001	(Rio de Janeiro (state)); Flamengo	5–3; 2–3; Aggregate; 7–6	(São Paulo (state)); São Paulo	(Paraná (state)); Coritiba	(Minas Gerais); Cruzeiro
2002	(Pará); Paysandu	1–2; 4–3; Aggregate; 5–5 (3–0 p)	(Minas Gerais); Cruzeiro	(Rio de Janeiro (state)); Flamengo	(São Paulo (state)); Palmeiras

Note 1: Losing semi-finalists are listed in alphabetical order.

== Records and statistics ==
=== Topscorers ===
Season	Player	Club	Goals
2000			
2001	Luis Fabiano	Sao Paulo	7
2002	Fabio Junior	Cruzeiro	6

=== Winning managers and captains ===
Season	Manager	Captain
2000	Luiz Felipe Scolari	Cesar Sampaio
2001	Mario Zagallo	Carlos Gamarra
2002	Givanildo Oliveira	Gino
