= 2013 Campeonato Brasiliense =

Campeonato Brasiliense de Futebol
- Season: 2013
- Champions: Brasiliense
- Relegated: Botafogo; Brazlândia
- Copa do Brasil: Brasiliense; Brasília; Ceilândia
- Série D: Brasília
- Matches: 72
- Goals: 186 (2.58 per match)

The 2013 Campeonato Brasiliense de Futebol was the 38th edition of the Federal District's top professional football league. The competition began on January 19, and ended on May 19. Brasiliense won the championship by the 8th time, while Botafogo and Brazlândia were relegated.

== Format ==
The tournament has two stages. On the first stage, all teams are split in two groups. In first round, each team plays against all other teams in the team's same group. In the second round, each team plays against all other teams in the other group. In both rounds, the two best teams in each group advances to a playoff, where the four teams play to find the team who wins the round.

On the second stage, the winner of the first round plays against the winner of the second round. If the same team wins both rounds, that team is the champion.

The bottom two teams on overall classification will be relegated.

=== Qualifications ===
The champion, the runner-up and the third place in overall standings qualify to 2014 Copa do Brasil. The best team who isn't playing on Campeonato Brasileiro Série A, Série B or Série C qualifies to the 2013 Campeonato Brasileiro Série D.

== Participating teams ==
| Club | Home city | 2012 result |
|---|---|---|
| Botafogo-DF | Novo Gama (Goiás state) | 9th |
| Brasília | Brasília | 2nd (2nd division) |
| Brasiliense | Taguatinga | 4th |
| Brazlândia | Brazlândia | 6th |
| Capital | Guará | 7th |
| Ceilandense | Ceilândia | 10th |
| Ceilândia | Ceilândia | 1st |
| Gama | Gama | 5th |
| Legião | Brasília | 8th |
| Luziânia | Luziânia (Goiás state) | 2nd |
| Sobradinho | Sobradinho | 3rd |
| Unaí | Unaí (Minas Gerais state) | 1st (2nd division) |

The Federação Brasiliense de Futebol allows teams from neighbouring states to play in its competition, with the condition that they are sited in cities no farther than 200km from Brasília.

== First round (Taça JK) ==
=== Standings ===
==== Group A ====
| Pos | Team | Pld | W | D | L | GF | GA | GD | Pts | Qualification |
|---|---|---|---|---|---|---|---|---|---|---|
| 1 | Brasiliense (A) | 6 | 3 | 2 | 1 | 5 | 3 | +2 | 11 | Qualifies to the Playoffs |
| 2 | Sobradinho (A) | 6 | 2 | 1 | 3 | 13 | 14 | −1 | 7 | Qualifies to the Playoffs |
| 3 | Luziânia | 6 | 1 | 2 | 3 | 5 | 7 | −2 | 5 | |
| 4 | Unaí | 6 | 1 | 2 | 3 | 7 | 10 | −3 | 5 | |
| 5 | Legião | 6 | 0 | 4 | 2 | 5 | 8 | −3 | 4 | |
| 6 | Botafogo-DF | 6 | 0 | 2 | 4 | 4 | 13 | −9 | 2 | |

Rules for classification: 1) points; 2) goal difference; 3) number of goals scored.
(A) Advance to a further round

==== Group B ====
| Pos | Team | Pld | W | D | L | GF | GA | GD | Pts | Qualification |
|---|---|---|---|---|---|---|---|---|---|---|
| 1 | Brasília (A) | 6 | 5 | 1 | 0 | 11 | 4 | +7 | 16 | Qualifies to the Playoffs |
| 2 | Gama (A) | 6 | 3 | 3 | 0 | 12 | 7 | +5 | 12 | Qualifies to the Playoffs |
| 3 | Ceilândia | 6 | 3 | 3 | 0 | 9 | 5 | +4 | 12 | |
| 4 | Capital | 6 | 3 | 1 | 2 | 8 | 5 | +3 | 10 | |
| 5 | Ceilandense | 6 | 2 | 2 | 2 | 11 | 8 | +3 | 8 | |
| 6 | Brazlândia | 6 | 0 | 3 | 3 | 4 | 10 | −6 | 3 | |

Rules for classification: 1) points; 2) goal difference; 3) number of goals scored.
(A) Advance to a further round

=== Results ===
| Home \ Away | BDF | BRS | LEG | LUZ | SOB | UNA | BIA | BLA | CAP | CES | CEI | GAM |
|---|---|---|---|---|---|---|---|---|---|---|---|---|
| Botafogo-DF | | | | | | | | 1–1 | 1–3 | | | 1–4 |
| Brasiliense | | | | | | | 0–2 | | 1–0 | 1–0 | 0–0 | |
| Legião | | | | | | | | 0–0 | | | 1–2 | 1–1 |
| Luziânia | | | | | | | 1–2 | 1–1 | | 2–2 | | |
| Sobradinho | | | | | | | 2–4 | | 2–3 | 3–2 | | |
| Unaí | | | | | | | | | | | 2–4 | 2–2 |
| Brasília | 1–0 | | 1–1 | | | 1–0 | | | | | | |
| Brazlândia | | 0–2 | | | 1–3 | 1–3 | | | | | | |
| Capital | | | 2–0 | 0–1 | | 0–0 | | | | | | |
| Ceilandense | 3–0 | | 2–2 | | | 2–0 | | | | | | |
| Ceilândia | 1–1 | | | 1–0 | 1–1 | | | | | | | |
| Gama | | 1–1 | | 1–0 | 3–2 | | | | | | | |

Legend: Blue = home team win; Yellow = draw; Red = away team win.

=== Playoffs ===
Semifinals
Brasiliense | 0
Gama | 0
Brasília | 2
Sobradinho | 2

Finals
Brasiliense | 1 | 1 | 2
Brasília | 3 | 0 | 3

==== Semifinals ====
March 2, 2013
18:00 UTC−03:00

| Brasília | 2–2 | Sobradinho |

Serejão, Taguatinga
Attendance: 1,005

March 3, 2013
16:00 UTC−03:00

| Brasiliense | 0–1 | Gama |

Serejão, Taguatinga
Attendance: 4,829

==== Finals ====
March 9, 2013
18:00 UTC−03:00

| Brasiliense | 1–3 | Brasília |
|---|---|---|
| Felipe 61' (o.g.) | | Giba 8'; Daniel 42'; Valdeir 87' |

Serejão, Taguatinga
Attendance: 2,156
Referee: Wales Martins

March 16, 2013
18:00 UTC−03:00

| Brasília | 0–1 | Brasiliense |
|---|---|---|
| | | Rodrigo Tiuí 58' |

Serejão, Taguatinga
Attendance: 2,130
Referee: Rodrigo Raposo

Brasília won the First round and qualifies to the Final stage

== Second round (Taça Mané Garrincha) ==
=== Standings ===
==== Group A ====
| Pos | Team | Pld | W | D | L | GF | GA | GD | Pts | Qualification |
|---|---|---|---|---|---|---|---|---|---|---|
| 1 | Brasiliense (A) | 5 | 5 | 0 | 0 | 8 | 0 | +8 | 15 | Qualifies to the Playoffs |
| 2 | Sobradinho (A) | 5 | 4 | 0 | 1 | 10 | 4 | +6 | 12 | Qualifies to the Playoffs |
| 3 | Botafogo-DF | 5 | 1 | 2 | 2 | 6 | 12 | −6 | 5 | |
| 4 | Unaí | 5 | 1 | 1 | 3 | 4 | 6 | −2 | 4 | |
| 5 | Legião | 5 | 1 | 1 | 3 | 4 | 7 | −3 | 4 | |
| 6 | Luziânia | 5 | 1 | 0 | 4 | 3 | 6 | −3 | 3 | |

Rules for classification: 1) points; 2) goal difference; 3) number of goals scored.
(A) Advance to a further round

==== Group B ====
| Pos | Team | Pld | W | D | L | GF | GA | GD | Pts | Qualification |
|---|---|---|---|---|---|---|---|---|---|---|
| 1 | Ceilândia (A) | 5 | 3 | 1 | 1 | 12 | 7 | +5 | 10 | Qualifies to the Playoffs |
| 2 | Ceilandense (A) | 5 | 3 | 1 | 1 | 7 | 4 | +3 | 10 | Qualifies to the Playoffs |
| 3 | Brasília | 5 | 3 | 0 | 2 | 9 | 5 | +4 | 9 | |
| 4 | Gama | 5 | 2 | 2 | 1 | 9 | 8 | +1 | 8 | |
| 5 | Capital | 5 | 1 | 2 | 2 | 9 | 10 | −1 | 5 | |
| 6 | Brazlândia | 5 | 0 | 0 | 5 | 2 | 14 | −12 | 0 | |

Rules for classification: 1) points; 2) goal difference; 3) number of goals scored.
(A) Advance to a further round

=== Results ===
==== Group A ====
| Home \ Away | BDF | BRS | LEG | LUZ | SOB | UNA |
|---|---|---|---|---|---|---|
| Botafogo-DF | | 0–3 | 2–2 | | | |
| Brasiliense | | | | | 1–0 | 1–0 |
| Legião | | 0–2 | | 2–1 | | |
| Luziânia | 0–1 | 0–1 | | | 1–2 | |
| Sobradinho | 5–1 | | 1–0 | | | 2–1 |
| Unaí | 2–2 | | 1–0 | 0–1 | | |

Legend: Blue = home team win; Yellow = draw; Red = away team win.

==== Group B ====
| Home \ Away | BIA | BLA | CAP | CES | CEI | GAM |
|---|---|---|---|---|---|---|
| Brasília | | 5–0 | | | 1–3 | |
| Brazlândia | | | | 0–2 | | 0–1 |
| Capital | 0–1 | 3–2 | | | | 3–3 |
| Ceilandense | 2–0 | | 1–0 | | | 2–2 |
| Ceilândia | | 3–0 | 3–3 | 2–0 | | |
| Gama | 0–2 | | | | 3–1 | |

Legend: Blue = home team win; Yellow = draw; Red = away team win.

=== Playoffs ===
Semifinals
Brasiliense | 0
Ceilandense | 0
Ceilândia | 0
Sobradinho | 0

Finals
Brasiliense | 1 | 2 | 3
Ceilândia | 1 | 0 | 1

==== Semifinals ====
April 27, 2013
16:00 UTC−03:00

| Brasiliense | 0–0 | Ceilandense |

Serejão, Taguatinga

April 28, 2013
16:00 UTC−03:00

| Ceilândia | 0–0 | Sobradinho |

Serejão, Taguatinga

==== Finals ====
May 1, 2013
16:00 UTC−03:00

| Ceilândia | 1–1 | Brasiliense |
|---|---|---|
| Clésio 79' | | Rodrigo Tiuí 68' |

Abadião, Ceilândia

May 4, 2013
16:00 UTC−03:00

| Brasiliense | 2–0 | Ceilândia |
|---|---|---|
| Washington 34'; Baiano 73' | Wales Martins |

Serejão, Taguatinga
Attendance: 3,100

Brasiliense won the Second Round and qualifies to the Final stage.

== Final stage ==
May 11, 2013
16:00 UTC−03:00

| Brasília | 0–1 | Brasiliense |
|---|---|---|
| | | Baiano 66' |

Serejão, Taguatinga
Attendance: 1,956
Referee: Sávio Sampaio

May 18, 2013
16:00 UTC−03:00

| Brasiliense | 3–0 | Brasília |
|---|---|---|
| Bocão 49'; Washington 79'; Romarinho 90+2' |

Estádio Nacional Mané Garrincha, Brasília
Referee: Rodrigo Raposo

Brasiliense won the 2013 Campeonato Brasiliense.

== Final standings ==
| Pos | Team | Pld | W | D | L | GF | GA | GD | Pts | Qualification or relegation |
|---|---|---|---|---|---|---|---|---|---|---|
| 1 | Brasiliense | 19 | 12 | 5 | 2 | 22 | 7 | +15 | 41 | Qualified to 2014 Copa do Brasil |
| 2 | Brasília | 16 | 9 | 2 | 5 | 25 | 17 | +8 | 29 | Qualified to 2014 Copa do Brasil and Série D |
| 3 | Ceilândia | 14 | 6 | 6 | 2 | 22 | 15 | +7 | 24 | Qualified to 2014 Copa do Brasil |
| 4 | Sobradinho | 13 | 6 | 3 | 4 | 25 | 20 | +5 | 21 | |
| 5 | Gama | 12 | 5 | 6 | 1 | 21 | 15 | +6 | 21 | |
| 6 | Ceilandense | 12 | 5 | 4 | 3 | 18 | 12 | +6 | 19 | |
| 7 | Capital | 11 | 4 | 3 | 4 | 17 | 15 | +2 | 15 | |
| 8 | Unaí | 11 | 2 | 3 | 6 | 11 | 16 | −5 | 9 | |
| 9 | Luziânia | 11 | 2 | 2 | 7 | 8 | 13 | −5 | 8 | |
| 10 | Legião | 11 | 1 | 5 | 5 | 9 | 15 | −6 | 8 | |
| 11 | Botafogo-DF (R) | 11 | 1 | 4 | 6 | 10 | 25 | −15 | 7 | Relegated |
| 12 | Brazlândia (R) | 11 | 0 | 3 | 8 | 6 | 24 | −18 | 3 | Relegated |

Rules for classification: 1) points; 2) goal difference; 3) number of goals scored.
(R) Relegated
