= 2017 Campeonato Brasiliense =

Campeonato Brasiliense
- Season: 2017
- Champions: Brasiliense
- Relegated: Brasília; Taguatinga
- Matches played: 33
- Goals scored: 85 (2.58 per match)
- Top goalscorer: Romarinho (13 goals) (Ceilândia)
- Biggest home win: Gama 5–0 Santa Cruz (R6, 2 March)
- Biggest away win: Brasília 0–5 Luziânia (R9, 12 March)
- Highest attendance: 3,021 Gama 2-0 Atlético Taguatinga
- All statistics correct as of 21:16, 21 April 2017 (UTC).

The 2017 Campeonato Brasiliense was the 42nd edition of the Campeonato Brasiliense, the main division of soccer of the Federal District, Brazil. The competition, which was organized by the Brasiliense Football Federation, was played between January 30 and May 7 by twelve teams from DF, Goiás and Minas Gerais. The championship awarded two places for the 2018 Copa do Brasil and the 2018 Copa Verde, as well as two places for the 2018 Campeonato Brasileiro Série D.

== Regulation ==
The championship was played in four stages: qualifying round, quarter finals, semifinals and final. In the first phase, the twelve teams played each other in first leg games, totaling eleven rounds. The eight teams with the most points scored in the first round advanced to the quarter-finals, while the last two teams were relegated to the second division in 2018. From then on, teams faced a knockout system until the championship game of 2017.

The champion and runner-up won places in two national championships: the 2018 Brasileirão Série D (unless one of them is already playing in Série A, Série B, or Série C, or already assured qualification to Série D) and the 2018 Copa do Brasil, and the teams in third and fourth place won places in the 2018 Copa Verde.

=== Tiebreaker ===
If there was a tie in the number of points won between two or more teams in the qualifying round, the following tiebreaker criteria were applied successively:

1. Highest number of wins
2. Highest goal difference
3. Highest number of goals for
4. Lowest number of red cards
5. Smallest number of yellow cards

In the playoffs of the knockout stages, a draw will occur after the 180 minutes of play, the match will be defined by means of penalties of maximum penalties.

== Participating teams ==
Team	City	In 2016	Stadium (I send in 2017)	Capacity	Titles
Clube Atlético Taguatinga	Taguatinga	9º	Serejão	27,000	0
Brasília Futebol Clube	Brasília	5º	Serejão	27 000	8 (last in 1987)
Brasiliense Futebol Clube	Taguatinga	3º	Abadião	4 000	8 (last in 2013)
Ceilândia Esporte Clube	Ceilândia	2º	Abadião	4 000	2 (last in 2012)
Bosque Formosa Esporte Clube	Formosa (Goiás state)	10º	Diogão	6 000	0
Sociedade Esportiva do Gama	Gama	4º	Bezerrão	20 000	11 (last in 2015)
Associação Atlética Luziânia	Luziânia (Goiás state)	1º	Serra do Lago	21 564	2 (last in 2016)
Paracatu Futebol Clube	Paracatu (Minas Gerais state)	6º	Frei Norberto	8 000	0
Paranoá Esporte Clube	Paranoá	2º (B)	JK	8,000	0
Real Futebol Clube	Núcleo Bandeirante	1º (B)	Metropolitana	3 000	0
Sociedade Esportiva Santa Maria	Santa Maria	7º	Bezerrão	20 000	0
Sobradinho Esporte Clube	Sobradinho	8º	Augustinho Lima	15,000	2 (last in 1986)

== First phase ==
=== Classification ===
Pos	M	Team	Pld	W	D	L	GF	GA	GD	Pts	Qualification or relegation
1	▲1	Ceilândia	11	7	3	1	18	7	+11	24	Advanced to quarterfinals
2	▲1	Brasiliense	11	7	3	1	16	7	+9	24	Advanced to quarterfinals
3	▼2	Gama	11	6	4	1	17	8	+9	22	Advanced to quarterfinals
4	Steady	Sobradinho	11	3	7	1	19	17	+2	16	Advanced to quarterfinals
5	Steady	Santa Maria	11	4	3	4	13	10	+3	15	Advanced to quarterfinals
6	Steady	Paracatu	11	4	3	4	14	13	+1	15	Advanced to quarterfinals
7	Steady	Real	11	3	5	3	11	11	0	14	Advanced to quarterfinals
8	Steady	Luziânia	11	3	3	5	11	11	0	12	Advanced to quarterfinals
9	▲1	Formosa	11	3	2	6	14	18	−4	11	
10	▼1	Paranoá	11	3	2	6	7	20	−13	11	
11	Steady	Brasília	11	2	1	8	14	26	−12	7	Relegated to 2018 Campeonato Brasiliense Segunda Divisão
12	Steady	Atlético Taguatinga	11	1	4	6	13	21	−8	7	Relegated to 2018 Campeonato Brasiliense Segunda Divisão

Updated to match(es) played on unknown. Source:

== Final phase ==
Quarter-finals
Paracatu	1	1	2 (3)
Gama	0	2	2 (2)
Luziânia	1	0	1
Ceilândia	5	1	6
Santa Maria	1	0	1 (2)
Sobradinho	0	1	1 (3)
Real	0	2	2
Brasiliense	3	1	4

Semi-finals
Paracatu	1	1	2
Ceilândia	1	2	3
Sobradinho	1	1	2
Brasiliense	2	4	6

Finals
Ceilândia	2	1	3
Brasiliense	2	2	4

Campeonato Brasiliense
2017 champion
Brasiliense
9th title

Brasiliense and Ceilândia qualify for 2018 Campeonato Brasileiro Série D.
Brasiliense and Ceilândia qualify for 2018 Copa do Brasil.
Brasiliense and Ceilândia qualify for 2018 Copa Verde.
