= Luís Carlos Souza =

Brazilian football coach and former player

Personal information
- Full name: Luís Carlos dos Santos Souza Vieira
- Date of birth: 2 September 1963 (age 63)
- Place of birth: Rio de Janeiro, Brazil
- Height: 1.74 m (5 ft 9 in)
- Position: Left winger

Team information
- Current team: Gama (head coach)

Youth career
- 1977–1979: Portuguesa
- 1981–1982: Guarani

Senior career*
Years	Team	Apps	(Gls)
1981–1982	Guarani		
1981	→ Taguatinga (loan)		
1983–1984	Comercial-SP		
1985–1986	America-RJ		
1986–1988	Atlético Goianiense		
1989	Goiás	15	(1)
1990	Portuguesa	29	(4)
1991	Ceará		(2)
1992	Atlético Goianiense		
1993	Novorizontino		
1993	Sport Recife	11	(2)
1994	Ferroviária		(1)
1994–1995	Sãocarlense		

Managerial career
- 2014: Brasília U20
- 2014–2015: Brasília
- 2016–2017: Brasiliense
- 2017: Real FC
- 2017: Luziânia
- 2018: Paranoá
- 2019: Luziânia
- 2020: Capital
- 2022: Brasília
- 2022: Real Brasília
- 2023: Paranoá
- 2024: Samambaia
- 2024: Brasiliense
- 2025: Samambaia
- 2025–: Gama
- * Club domestic league appearances and goals

Luís Carlos dos Santos Souza Vieira (born 2 September 1963), known as Luís Carlos Souza, is a Brazilian football coach and former player who played as a left winger. He is the current head coach of Gama.

== Playing career ==
Born in Rio de Janeiro, Souza was known as Luís Carlos Carioca during his playing career. He moved to Brasília at the age of ten, and began his career with the youth sides of Portuguesa at the age of 13. Two years later, he moved back to Brasília and took part of athletics competitions.

Back to football after impressing in a friendly match, Luís Carlos Carioca joined Guarani in 1981, and later spent a period at Taguatinga back in his local Brasília. He subsequently played for Comercial-SP, America-RJ, Atlético Goianiense and Goiás before returning to Lusa in 1990, now as a first team member.

Luís Carlos Carioca then represented Ceará, Atlético Goianiense, Novorizontino, Sport Recife and Ferroviária, leaving the latter club in February 1994 after being swapped by Edelvan with Sãocarlense. He retired in 1995, aged 31.

== Coaching career ==
Souza began his career with Brasília's under-20 team, before being appointed head coach of the first team in February 2014, replacing Marcos Soares.

He led the club to the 2014 Copa Verde title, but was sacked in May of the following year, before the club's first-ever international competition.

On 22 February 2016, Souza was named in charge of Brasiliense. Dismissed on 7 March 2017, he took over Real FC three days later.

Souza continued to work in clubs from the Campeonato Brasiliense in the following years, being in charge of Luziânia (two stints), Paranoá and Capital, before returning to Brasília in 2022. He finished the year back at Real – now named Real Brasília – before returning to Paranoá for the 2023 season.

Souza began the 2024 campaign in charge of Samambaia, before replacing Vilson Tadei at the helm of Brasiliense in March. He returned to Samambaia after the 2024 Série D, but left the club in the half-time of a 2–0 loss to Paranoá on 29 January 2025.

On 24 February 2025, Souza was announced as Gama head coach, and led the club to a state league title. On 5 May, he renewed his contract until 2027, and achieved promotion with the side in the 2026 Série D.

== Personal life ==
Souza is friends with Neto, as both played together in the youth categories of Guarani.

== Honours ==
=== Player ===
Taguatinga

- Campeonato Brasiliense: 1981

=== Coach ===
Brasília

- Copa Verde: 2014

Gama

- Campeonato Brasiliense: 2025, 2026
