= Ramon Mesquita =

Brazilian footballer (born 1988)

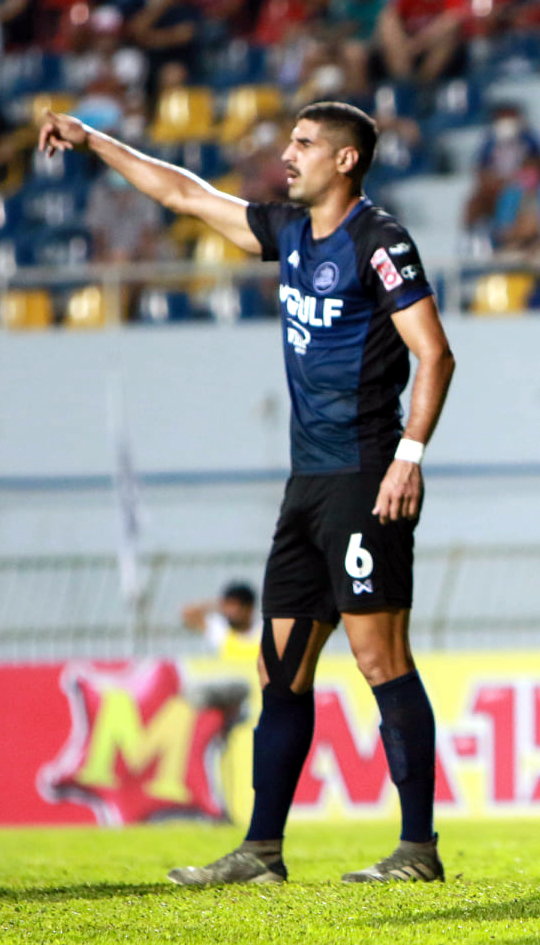
- Ramon Mesquita playing for Rayong

Personal information
- Full name: Ramon Rodrigues de Mesquita
- Date of birth: 15 June 1988 (age 38)
- Place of birth: Brasília, Brazil
- Height: 1.89 m (6 ft 2 1/2 in)
- Position: Defender

Team information
- Current team: Rasisalai United
- Number: 5

Youth career
- –2006: Brasiliense

Senior career*
Years	Team	Apps	(Gls)
2006	Sobradinho		
- CR Guará
- Bandeirantes
- Guará
- São José
2009	Legião		
- Capital CF
2010	Brasília		
2013	Joinville		
2013	Sobradinho		
2014	Duque de Caxias		
2015	Hermann Aichinger		
2016	Caxias	6	(1)
2017	Than Quảng Ninh	8	(0)
2017	Persela Lamongan	15	(1)
2018–2020	Nongbua Pitchaya	29	(3)
2020–2021	Manaus	7	(0)
2021–2022	Rayong	20	(1)
2023	Phitsanulok	5	(0)
2023	Mahasarakham SBT	11	(2)
2024	Krabi	16	(0)
2024–	Rasisalai United	45	(6)
- * Club domestic league appearances and goals as of 30 March 2025

Ramon Rodrigues de Mesquita (born 15 June 1988) is a Brazilian professional footballer who plays as a defender for and captains Thai League 1 club Rasisalai United.

== Club career ==
Mesquita joined Vietnamese side Than Quảng Ninh in January 2017. He was released along with fellow Brazilian Jardel in April of the same year.

On October 15, 2017, Mesquita accidentally collided into his Persela Lamongan teammate, goalkeeper Choirul Huda, during a match against Semen Padang FC. Huda suffered a hard collision on his chest and lower jaw, causing an oxygen deprivation that led to his death.

== Career statistics ==
=== Club ===
As of 19 April 2018.

Club	Season	League			Cup		Continental		Other		Total	
Club	Season	Division	Apps	Goals	Apps	Goals	Apps	Goals	Apps	Goals	Apps	Goals
Joinville	2013	Série B	1	0	0	0	–		0	0	1	0
Sobradinho	2013	—	0	0	2 (Note: Appearances in the Copa do Brasil)	0	–		0	0	2	0
Duque de Caxias	2014	Série C	0	0	0	0	–		5 (Note: Appearances in the Campeonato Carioca)	0	5	0
Hermann Aichinger	2015	—	0	0	0	0	–		10 (Note: Appearances in the Campeonato Catarinense)	0	10	0
Caxias	2016	Série D	6	1	0	0	–		25 (Note: Appearances in the Gaúcho Acesso)	5	31	6
Than Quảng Ninh	2017	V.League 1	8	0	1 (Note: Appearances in the Vietnamese Super Cup)	0	–		0	0	9	0
Persela Lamongan	2017	Liga 1	15	1	0	0	–		0	0	15	1
Nongbua Pitchaya	2018	Thai League 2	0	0	0	0	–		0	0	0	0
Career total			30	2	3	0	–		40	5	73	7

== Honours ==
Rasisalai United

- Thai League 2: 2025–26
- Thai League 3: 2024–25
- Thai League 3 Northeastern Region: 2024–25

Phitsanulok

- Thai League 3 Northern Region: 2022–23
