= Rafael Toledo =

Brazilian footballer (born 1980)

Personal information
- Full name: Rafael Gonçalves Toledo
- Date of birth: 24 January 1980 (age 46)
- Place of birth: Limeira, Brazil
- Height: 1.76 m (5 ft 9 in)
- Position: Right back

Team information
- Current team: Buriram United (assistant)

Youth career
- 1999–2000: Rio Branco

Senior career*
Years	Team	Apps	(Gls)
2001	Grêmio		
2002	Rio Branco		
2003	Guarani		
2004	Criciúma		
2005–2009	Atlético Paranaense		
2005	→ Atlético Sorocaba (loan)		
2005	→ Portuguesa (loan)		
2005	→ Bahia (loan)		
2006–2007	→ Brasiliense (loan)		
2008	→ Juventus-SP (loan)		
2008	→ Santa Helena (loan)		
2008	→ Luziânia (loan)		
2011	Rio Branco		
2012	Juventude		
2013–2014	Capital		

Managerial career
- 2017–2018: Brasiliense
- 2019–: Vila Nova (assistant)
- 2019: Vila Nova (interim)
- * Club domestic league appearances and goals

Rafael Gonçalves Toledo (born 24 January 1980 in Limeira), commonly known as Rafael Toledo, is a Brazilian retired footballer who played as a right back, and is the current assistant manager of Buriram United.

== Honours ==
=== Player ===
Atlético Paranaense

- Campeonato Paranaense: 2005

Brasiliense

- Campeonato Brasiliense: 2006

=== Manager ===
Brasiliense

- Campeonato Brasiliense: 2017
