= Luís dos Reis =

Brazilian football manager (born 1962)

Personal information
- Full name: Luís dos Reis Gonçalves
- Date of birth: 1 February 1962 (age 64)
- Place of birth: São Paulo, Brazil

Managerial career
- Years: Team
- 1994–1995: Elosport
- 1996–1998: Palmeiras (youth)
- 1999: Botafogo-SP (assistant)
- 2000: Operário-SP
- 2000: Caldense
- 2001: Ventforet Kofu
- 2002: Marcílio Dias
- 2003: Primavera
- 2004: São José-SP
- 2004: Camboriuense
- 2005: Guarani de Palhoça
- 2005: Primavera
- 2006: Santacruzense
- 2007: Portuguesa Santista
- 2007: Inter de Limeira
- 2008: Guarujá
- 2008–2010: Golden Arrows (assistant)
- 2010: Portuguesa Santista
- 2011–2012: Palmeiras B
- 2013–2015: Marília
- 2015: Matonense
- 2016: Rio Claro
- 2016: Velo Clube
- 2017: Primavera
- 2018: Rondoniense
- 2018: Itapirense
- 2019: Real Ariquemes
- 2019: Itapirense
- 2020: Sobradinho
- 2020: Imperatriz
- 2020: Barra Mansa
- 2021: Poconé
- 2021: Brasília
- 2022: Coxim
- 2022–2023: Samambaia
- 2023: Brasiliense
- 2023: Ceilandense
- 2024: Brasiliense

Luís dos Reis Goncalves (born 1 February 1962) is a Brazilian football coach.

== Managerial statistics ==
Team	From	To	Record				
Team	From	To	G	W	D	L	Win %
Ventforet Kofu	2001	2001	46	8	2	36	17.39
Total			46	8	2	36	17.39
