= Tobinha =

Brazilian footballer

Personal information
- Full name: Moisés Barros dos Santos
- Date of birth: 4 October 1993 (age 33)
- Place of birth: Conceição do Coité, Brazil
- Height: 1.76 m (5 ft 9 in)
- Positions: Attacking midfielder; forward

Team information
- Current team: Capital-DF

Senior career*
Years	Team	Apps	(Gls)
2020	Atlético de Alagoinhas	10	(1)
2021–2025	Brasiliense	102	(29)
2022	→ Samambaia (loan)	3	(1)
2023	→ Brusque (loan)	4	(0)
2025	Capital-DF	12	(1)
2025	Manauara	3	(0)
2026–	Capital-DF	6	(2)
- * Club domestic league appearances and goals as of 8 March 2026

Moisés Barros dos Santos (born 4 October 1993), better known as Tobinha is a Brazilian professional footballer who plays as attacking midfielder or a forward for Capital-DF.

== Career ==
Playing amateur competitions in the interior of the Bahia state, Tobinha only started his professional career at the age of 26. Atlético de Alagoinhas being his first club, Tobinha started his journey after returning from the COVID-19 stoppage, and already winning the unprecedented state title with the club.

Tobinha gained national visibility in Brasiliense, team he transferred to in 2021, both due to his good performances and his unusual nickname, which was successful on social networks.

After Brasiliense elimination of 2023 Campeonato Brasileiro Série D, he was announced as reinforcement for Brusque in the final stage of Série C.

On 11 April 2025, Tobinha left Brasiliense after 102 appearances and 29 goals scored during five years, and signed with Capital CF to 2025 Campeonato Brasileiro Série D dispute. After Capital's elimination, Tobinha was later hired by Manauara EC in the continuation of the competition.

== Honours ==
Atlético de Alagoinhas

- Campeonato Baiano: 2020

Brasiliense

- Copa Verde: 2020
- Campeonato Brasiliense: 2021, 2022

Samambaia

- Campeonato Brasiliense Second Division: 2022
