= Jairo Araújo =

Brazilian footballer and manager

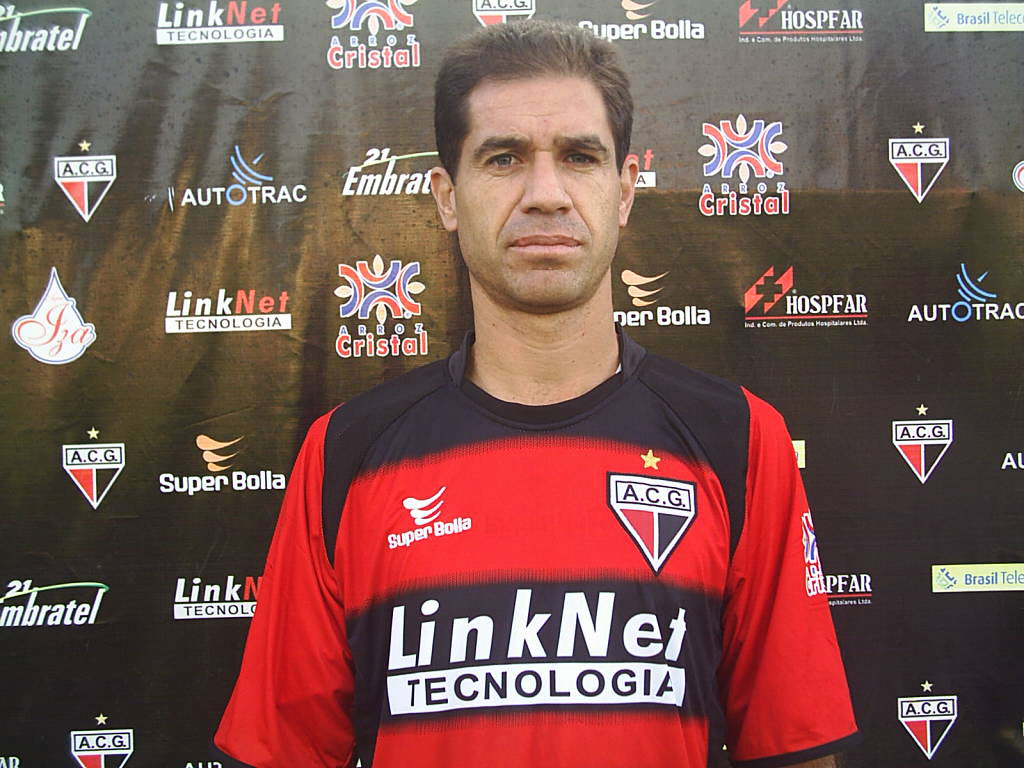

Personal information
- Full name: Jairo Lima de Araújo
- Date of birth: 29 July 1974 (age 52)
- Place of birth: Brasília, Brazil
- Height: 1.80 m (5 ft 11 in)
- Position: Centre-back

Team information
- Current team: Brasília (head coach)

Senior career*
Years	Team	Apps	(Gls)
1995–1997	Gama		
1998	Portuguesa Santista		
1999	Gama		
1999	Guarani		
2000	Gama		
2000	Matonense		
2001–2003	Gama		
2004–2006	Brasiliense	135	(5)
2007–2011	Atlético Goianiense	145	(14)

Managerial career
- 2011–2013: Atlético Goianiense (assistant)
- 2011: Atlético Goianiense (interim)
- 2012: Atlético Goianiense (interim)
- 2012: Atlético Goianiense (interim)
- 2012: Atlético Goianiense (interim)
- 2013: Atlético Goianiense
- 2014: Rio Verde
- 2016: Taguatinga
- 2016: CRAC
- 2018: Luziânia
- 2019: Ceilândia
- 2025: Luziânia
- 2026–: Brasília
- * Club domestic league appearances and goals

Jairo Lima de Araújo (born 7 July 1961), known as Jairo Araújo or just Jairo, is a Brazilian football coach and former player who played as a centre-back. He is the current head coach of Brasília.

== Honours ==
Gama

- Campeonato Brasiliense: 1995, 1997, 1998
- Campeonato Brasileiro Série B: 1998

Brasiliense

- Campeonato Brasiliense: 2004, 2005, 2006
- Campeonato Brasileiro Série B: 2004

Atlético Goianiense

- Campeonato Goiano: 2007, 2010, 2011
- Campeonato Brasileiro Série C: 2008
