= Adriano Felício =

Brazilian footballer (born 1980)

Personal information
- Full name: Adriano do Nacimento Felício Guedes
- Date of birth: February 22, 1980 (age 46)
- Place of birth: Paraíba do Sul, Brazil
- Height: 1.79 m (5 ft 10 in)
- Position: Attacking midfielder

Senior career*
Years	Team	Apps	(Gls)
2001–2005	Madureira		
2003	→ Portuguesa da Ilha (loan)		
2004	→ America (loan)		
2004	→ Volta Redonda (loan)		
2006–2007	Volta Redonda		
2007–2008	Botafogo		
2009	Madureira		
2009	Volta Redonda		
2010	Botafogo-DF		
2010–2011	Brasiliense		
2011	Anápolis		
2011	Itumbiara		
2012	Campinense		
2013	Volta Redonda		
2013	Tupi		
2014	Ceilândia		
- * Club domestic league appearances and goals

Adriano do Nacimento Felício Guedes or simply Adriano Felício (born February 22, 1980), is a Brazilian attacking midfielder.

== Honours ==
- 2003 – Campeonato Carioca Série B (Portuguesa da Ilha)
- 2004 – Campeonato Carioca Série B (Volta Redonda)
- 2012 – Campeonato Paraibano (Campinense)
