= Campeonato Brasiliense de Futebol Feminino =

Women's football league in Distrito Federal, Brazil

- Founded: 1986
- Country: Brazil
- Confederation: FFDF
- Promotion to: Brasileiro Série A3
- Current champions: Minas Brasília (4th title) (2025)
- Most championships: CRESSPOM (7 titles)
- Current: 2025

The Campeonato Brasiliense de Futebol Feminino is the women's football state championship of Distrito Federal State, and is contested since 1986.

== List of champions ==
Following is the list with all recognized titles of Campeonato Brasiliense Feminino:

Season	Champions	Runners-up
1986	Vila Dimas (1)	
1987	Vila Dimas (2)	
1988–1996	Not held	
1997	Tiradentes (1)	
1998	ARUC (1)	
1999	Iate Clube (1)	
2000	CFZ (1)	
2001	CFZ (2)	
2002	CFZ (3)	
2003	CFZ (4)	
2004	Apollo 4 (1)	
2005	Apollo 4 (2)	
2006	Luziânia (1)	Caesb
2007	CRESSPOM (1)	Guarany
2008	CRESSPOM (2)	ASCOOP
2009	CRESSPOM (3)	Bandeirante
2010	ASCOOP (1)	CRESSPOM
2011	CRESSPOM (4)	Capital
2012	CRESSPOM (5)	Minas Brasília
2013	Capital (1)	CRESSPOM
2014	CRESSPOM (6)	São Sebastião
2015	CRESSPOM (7)	Ceilândia
2016	Minas Brasília (1)	CRESSPOM
2017	Minas Brasília (2)	Ceilândia
2018	Minas Brasília (3)	CRESSPOM
2019	Real Brasília (1)	Minas Brasília
2020	Real Brasília (2)	Minas Brasília
2021	Real Brasília (3)	Minas Brasília
2022	Real Brasília (4)	Minas Brasília
2023	Real Brasília (5)	Minas Brasília
2024	Real Brasília (6)	Minas Brasília
2025	Minas Brasília (4)	Real Brasília

== Titles by team ==
Teams in bold stills active.

Rank	Club	Winners	Winning years
1	**CRESSPOM**	7	2007, 2008, 2009, 2011, 2012, 2014, 2015
2	**Real Brasília**	6	2019, 2020, 2021, 2022, 2023, 2024
3	CFZ	4	2000, 2001, 2002, 2003
3	**Minas Brasília**	4	2016, 2017, 2018, 2025
5	Apollo 4	2	2004, 2005
5	Vila Dimas	2	1986, 1987
7	ARUC	1	1998
7	ASCOOP	1	2010
7	**Capital**	1	2013
7	Iate Clube	1	1999
7	Luziânia	1	2006
7	Tiradentes	1	1997
