= Campeonato Brasiliense Third Division =

- Founded: 2006
- Folded: 2010
- Country: Brazil
- Confederation: Federação Brasiliense de Futebol
- Level on pyramid: 3
- Promotion to: 2nd Division
- Most championships: Brazsat; Capital; Legião; Santa Maria (1 title each)

The Campeonato Brasiliense Third Division was the third tier of football league of the Federal District, Brazil.

== List of champions ==
Season	Champions	Runners-up
2006	Legião (1)	Brasília
2007	Santa Maria (1)	Brasília
2008	Brazsat (1)	CFZ
2009	Capital (1)	Bosque Formosa

== Titles by team ==
Teams in bold still active.

Rank	Club	Winners	Winning years
1	Brazsat	1	2008
1	**Capital**	1	2009
1	**Legião**	1	2006
1	**Santa Maria**	1	2007
