= 2012 Campeonato Brasileiro Série A =

Campeonato Brasileiro Série A
- Season: 2012
- Champions: Fluminense; 3rd Campeonato Brasileiro title 4th Brazilian title
- Relegated: Figueirense; Atlético Goianiense; Palmeiras; Sport Recife
- Copa Libertadores de América: Corinthians (title holder); Palmeiras (cup winner); Fluminense; Grêmio; Atlético Mineiro; São Paulo
- Matches: 380
- Goals: 940 (2.47 per match)
- Top goalscorer: Fred (20)
- Biggest home win: Atlético Mineiro 6−0 Figueirense
- Biggest away win: Vasco 0−4 Bahia
- Highest scoring: Figueirense 3−4 Atlético Mineiro
- Longest winning run: 7 games Atlético Mineiro
- Longest unbeaten run: 15 games Grêmio
- Longest winless run: 14 games Figueirense
- Longest losing run: 7 games Atlético Goianiense; Figueirense
- Highest attendance: São Paulo 2−1 Náutico 62,207
- Lowest attendance: Atlético Goianiense 0−1 Sport 449
- Average attendance: 12,983

The 2012 Campeonato Brasileiro Série A (known as the Brasileirão Petrobras 2012 for sponsorship reasons) was the 56th edition of the Campeonato Brasileiro Série A, the top-level of professional football in Brazil. Corinthians come in as the defending champions having won the title in the 2011 season. On 11 November 2012, Fluminense won the title for the fourth time.

== Format ==
For the tenth consecutive season, the tournament will be played in a double round-robin system. The team with most points at the end of the season will be declared champion. The bottom four teams will be relegated and will play in the Campeonato Brasileiro Série B in the 2013 season.

=== International qualification ===
The Série A will serve as a qualifier to CONMEBOL's 2013 Copa Libertadores. The top-two teams in the standings will qualify to the Second Stage of the competition, while the third and fourth places in the standings will qualify to the First Stage.

== Teams ==
=== Stadiums and locations ===
Locations of the 2012 Série A teams

Team	Home city	Stadium	Capacity
Atlético Goianiense	Goiânia	Serra Dourada; Boca do Jacaré (one match); Bezerrão (one match)	50,049; 30,000; 20,000
Atlético Mineiro	Belo Horizonte	Independência	23,018
Bahia	Salvador	Pituaçu	31,677
Botafogo	Rio de Janeiro	Engenhão	44,000
Corinthians	São Paulo	Pacaembu	37,952
Coritiba	Curitiba	Couto Pereira	38,000
Cruzeiro	Belo Horizonte	Independência; Melão (5 matches); Parque do Sabiá (one match)	23,018; 15,471; 50,000
Figueirense	Florianópolis	Orlando Scarpelli	19,069
Flamengo	Rio de Janeiro	Engenhão; Raulino de Oliveira (5 matches)	44,000; 20,255
Fluminense	Rio de Janeiro	Engenhão; Raulino de Oliveira (3 matches); São Januário (2 matches)	44,000; 20,255; 22,150
Grêmio	Porto Alegre	Olímpico	45,000
Internacional	Porto Alegre	Beira-Rio	56,000
Náutico	Recife	Aflitos	19,800
Palmeiras	São Paulo	Pacaembu (8 matches); Arena Barueri (7 matches); Fonte Luminosa (3 matches); Prudentão (one match)	37,952; 31,452; 20,287; 44,414
Ponte Preta	Campinas	Moisés Lucarelli	19,728
Portuguesa	São Paulo	Canindé	21,004
Santos	Santos	Vila Belmiro; Pacaembu (2 matches)	21,256; 37,952
São Paulo	São Paulo	Morumbi; Pacaembu (one match)	67,428; 37,952
Sport	Recife	Ilha do Retiro	30,520
Vasco da Gama	Rio de Janeiro	São Januário; Engenhão (3 matches)	22,150; 44,000

=== Personnel and kits ===
Team	Coach	Captain	Kit manufacturer	Shirt sponsor
Atlético Goianiense	(Brazil) Artur Neto	(Brazil) Márcio	Super Bolla	Cimento Tocantins
Atlético Mineiro	(Brazil) Cuca	(Brazil) Réver	Topper	Banco BMG
Bahia	(Brazil) Jorginho	(Brazil) Titi	Nike	Grupo OAS
Botafogo	(Brazil) Oswaldo de Oliveira	(Brazil) Jefferson	Puma	Guaraviton
Corinthians	(Brazil) Tite	(Brazil) Alessandro	Nike	Caixa
Coritiba	(Brazil) Marquinhos Santos	(Brazil) Lincoln	Nike	Caixa
Cruzeiro	(Brazil) Celso Roth	(Brazil) Fábio	Olympikus	Banco BMG
Figueirense	(Brazil) Adilson Batista	(Brazil) Wilson	Penalty	Taschibra
Flamengo	(Brazil) Vanderlei Luxemburgo	(Brazil) Leonardo Moura	Olympikus	UNICEF
Fluminense	(Brazil) Abel Braga	(Brazil) Fred	Adidas	Unimed
Grêmio	(Brazil) Vanderlei Luxemburgo	(Brazil) Gilberto Silva	Topper	Banrisul
Internacional	(Brazil) Osmar Loss (caretaker)	(Argentina) Andrés D'Alessandro	Nike	Banrisul
Náutico	(Brazil) Alexandre Gallo	(Brazil) Martinez	Penalty	None
Palmeiras	(Brazil) Gilson Kleina	(Brazil) Marcos Assunção	Adidas	Kia
Ponte Preta	(Brazil) Guto Ferreira	(Brazil) Roger	Pulse	Hitachi
Portuguesa	(Brazil) Geninho	(Brazil) Marcelo Cordeiro	Lupo	Irwin
Santos	(Brazil) Muricy Ramalho	(Brazil) Neymar	Nike	Banco BMG
São Paulo	(Brazil) Ney Franco	(Brazil) Rogério Ceni	Reebok	Semp Toshiba
Sport	(Brazil) Sérgio Guedes	(Brazil) Magrão	Lotto	MRV
Vasco da Gama	(Brazil) Gaúcho	(Brazil) Juninho Pernambucano	Penalty	Eletrobras

=== Managerial changes ===
Team	Outgoing manager	Manner of departure	Date of vacancy	Position in table	Replaced by
Atlético/GO	(Brazil) Adílson Batista	Sacked	29 May	10th	(Brazil) Hélio dos Anjos
São Paulo	(Brazil) Emerson Leão	Sacked	26 June	8th	(Brazil) Ney Franco
Atlético/GO	(Brazil) Hélio dos Anjos	Resigned	9 July	20th	(Brazil) Jairo Araújo
Bahia	(Brazil) Paulo Roberto Falcão	Sacked	20 July	19th	(Brazil) Caio Júnior
Internacional	(Brazil) Dorival Júnior	Sacked	20 July	8th	(Brazil) Fernandão
Figueirense	(Brazil) Argel Fucks	Sacked	20 July	17th	(Brazil) Hélio dos Anjos
Flamengo	(Brazil) Joel Santana	Sacked	23 July	10th	(Brazil) Dorival Júnior
Sport	(Brazil) Vágner Mancini	Resigned	11 August	16th	(Brazil) Waldemar Lemos
Figueirense	(Brazil) Hélio dos Anjos	Sacked	24 August	20th	(Brazil) Márcio Goiano
Bahia	(Brazil) Caio Júnior	Resigned	27 August	16th	(Brazil) Jorginho
Coritiba	(Brazil) Marcelo Oliveira	Sacked	6 September	16th	(Brazil) Marquinhos Santos
Vasco da Gama	(Brazil) Cristóvão Borges	Resigned	9 September	4th	(Brazil) Marcelo Oliveira
Palmeiras	(Brazil) Luiz Felipe Scolari	Mutual consent	13 September	19th	(Brazil) Narciso
Atlético/GO	(Brazil) Jairo Araújo	Resigned	13 September	20th	(Brazil) Artur Neto
Palmeiras	(Brazil) Narciso	Replaced	19 September	19th	(Brazil) Gilson Kleina
Ponte Preta	(Brazil) Gilson Kleina	Left to sign with Palmeiras	19 September	11th	(Brazil) Guto Ferreira
Sport	(Brazil) Waldemar Lemos	Sacked	6 October	17th	(Brazil) Sérgio Guedes
Vasco da Gama	(Brazil) Marcelo Oliveira	Sacked	5 November	7th	(Brazil) Gaúcho
Figueirense	(Brazil) Márcio Goiano	Sacked	5 November	19th	(Brazil) Adílson Batista
Internacional	(Brazil) Fernandão	Sacked	20 November	8th	(Brazil) Osmar Loss (caretaker)

== League table ==
Pos	Team	Pld	W	D	L	GF	GA	GD	Pts	Qualification or relegation
1	Fluminense (C)	38	22	11	5	61	33	+28	77	2013 Copa Libertadores Second Stage
2	Atlético Mineiro	38	20	12	6	64	37	+27	72	2013 Copa Libertadores Second Stage
3	Grêmio	38	20	11	7	56	33	+23	71	2013 Copa Libertadores First Stage
4	São Paulo	38	20	6	12	59	37	+22	66	2013 Copa Libertadores First Stage
5	Vasco da Gama	38	16	10	12	45	44	+1	58	
6	Corinthians	38	15	12	11	51	39	+12	57	2013 Copa Libertadores Second Stage (Note: Corinthians qualified for the second stage of the 2013 Copa Libertadores as the 2012 Copa Libertadores champion.)
7	Botafogo	38	15	10	13	60	50	+10	55	
8	Santos	38	13	14	11	50	44	+6	53	
9	Cruzeiro	38	15	7	16	47	51	−4	52	
10	Internacional	38	13	13	12	44	40	+4	52	
11	Flamengo	38	12	14	12	38	45	−7	50	
12	Náutico	38	14	7	17	44	51	−7	49	
13	Coritiba	38	14	6	18	53	60	−7	48	
14	Ponte Preta	38	12	12	14	37	44	−7	48	
15	Bahia	38	11	14	13	37	41	−4	47	
16	Portuguesa	38	10	15	13	39	41	−2	45	
17	Sport Recife	38	10	11	17	39	56	−17	41	Relegation to 2013 Série B
18	Palmeiras	38	9	7	22	39	54	−15	34	Copa Libertadores Second Stage and relegation to Série B (Note: Palmeiras qualified for the second stage of the 2013 Copa Libertadores as the 2012 Copa do Brasil champion.)
19	Atlético Goianiense	38	7	9	22	37	67	−30	30	Relegation to 2013 Série B
20	Figueirense	38	7	9	22	39	72	−33	30	Relegation to 2013 Série B

Updated to match(es) played on unknown. Source: UOL.com.br
Rules for classification: 1st points; 2nd wins; 3rd goal difference; 4th goals scored; 5th head-to-head results; 6th least red cards received; 7th least yellow cards received; 8th draw
(C) Champions

== Results ==
Home \ Away	ACG	CAM	BAH	BOT	COR	CTB	CRU	FIG	FLA	FLU	GRE	INT	NAU	PAL	PON	POR	SAN	SPA	SPT	VAS
Atlético Goianiense		1–1	0–1	1–2	0–2	1–2	0–2	3–2	1–2	1–4	0–1	3–1	0–1	2–1	1–1	1–1	2–1	4–3	0–1	0–1
Atlético Mineiro	2–2		1–1	3–2	1–0	1–0	3–2	6–0	1–1	3–2	0–0	3–1	5–1	3–0	2–2	2–0	2–0	1–0	2–1	1–0
Bahia	1–1	0–0		2–0	0–0	2–2	0–1	2–1	1–2	0–2	1–1	1–1	1–1	0–1	1–0	0–0	0–0	1–0	2–1	1–2
Botafogo	4–0	2–3	3–0		2–2	2–0	2–3	1–0	0–0	1–1	0–1	1–1	3–1	1–2	1–2	3–0	0–2	4–2	2–0	3–2
Corinthians	1–1	1–0	1–1	1–3		5–1	2–0	1–1	3–2	0–1	3–1	1–0	2–1	2–1	1–1	1–1	1–1	1–2	3–0	1–0
Coritiba	3–0	1–0	2–1	2–3	1–2		4–0	3–0	3–0	0–2	2–1	1–0	2–1	1–1	1–0	2–0	1–2	1–1	2–3	1–2
Cruzeiro	0–0	2–2	3–1	1–3	2–0	2–1		1–0	1–0	1–1	1–3	0–0	3–0	2–1	1–2	2–0	0–4	2–3	1–0	1–1
Figueirense	3–1	3–4	1–1	0–2	1–0	3–1	2–0		0–2	2–2	2–4	0–1	2–1	1–3	0–0	0–0	1–3	0–2	1–1	1–1
Flamengo	3–2	2–1	0–0	2–2	0–3	3–1	1–1	1–0		0–1	1–1	3–3	2–0	1–1	0–1	0–0	1–0	1–0	1–1	1–0
Fluminense	1–2	0–0	4–0	1–0	1–1	2–1	0–2	2–2	1–0		2–2	0–0	2–1	1–0	2–1	4–1	3–1	2–1	1–0	1–2
Grêmio	2–1	0–1	3–1	1–1	2–0	0–0	2–1	4–0	2–0	1–0		0–0	2–0	1–0	1–0	1–2	1–1	2–1	3–1	2–0
Internacional	4–1	3–0	3–1	1–2	0–2	2–0	2–1	2–3	4–1	0–1	0–1		0–0	2–1	2–1	0–2	0–0	1–0	2–2	0–0
Náutico	2–0	1–0	1–0	3–2	2–1	3–4	0–0	3–2	0–1	0–2	1–0	3–0		1–0	3–0	0–0	3–0	3–0	1–0	1–1
Palmeiras	1–2	0–1	0–2	2–2	0–2	0–1	2–0	3–1	1–0	2–3	0–0	0–1	3–0		3–0	1–1	1–2	1–1	3–1	1–1
Ponte Preta	3–1	0–1	0–2	0–0	1–0	4–1	1–0	2–2	2–2	1–2	0–0	1–0	2–1	1–0		2–1	1–0	0–0	1–1	0–0
Portuguesa	2–0	1–1	0–1	1–1	1–1	3–0	0–2	2–0	0–0	0–2	2–2	1–1	3–1	3–0	0–0		0–0	1–0	5–1	0–1
Santos	2–2	2–2	1–3	0–0	3–2	2–2	4–2	2–0	2–0	1–1	4–2	1–1	0–0	3–1	2–1	1–3		0–0	0–0	2–0
São Paulo	2–0	1–0	1–0	4–0	3–1	3–1	1–0	2–0	4–1	1–1	1–2	1–1	2–1	3–0	3–0	3–1	1–0		1–0	0–1
Sport Recife	0–0	1–4	1–1	2–0	1–1	1–0	2–1	0–1	1–1	1–1	1–3	0–2	0–0	2–1	3–1	2–1	2–1	2–4		0–2
Vasco da Gama	1–0	1–1	0–4	1–0	0–0	2–2	1–3	3–1	1–1	1–2	2–1	1–2	4–2	3–1	3–2	2–0	2–0	0–2	0–3	

Source: http://www.cbf.com.br
Legend: Blue = home team win; Yellow = draw; Red = away team win.

== Top goalscorers ==
Rank	Name	Nationality	Club	Goals
1	Fred	Brazilian	Fluminense	20
2	Luís Fabiano	Brazilian	São Paulo	17
3	Aloísio	Brazilian	Figueirense	14
3	Hernán Barcos	Argentine	Palmeiras	14
3	Bruno Mineiro	Brazilian	Portuguesa	14
3	Neymar	Brazilian	Santos	14
7	Kieza	Brazilian	Náutico	13
7	Vágner Love	Brazilian	Flamengo	13
9	Bernard	Brazilian	Atlético Mineiro	11
9	Elkeson	Brazilian	Botafogo	11

Source: globoesporte.com
