= Marcinho Pitbull =

Brazilian footballer

Personal information
- Full name: Márcio José Lisboa Fortes Filho
- Date of birth: 8 June 1987 (age 39)
- Place of birth: Rio de Janeiro, Brazil
- Height: 1.67 m (5 ft 6 in)
- Position: Midfielder

Team information
- Current team: Real Madrid

Youth career
- 1996–2006: Flamengo

Senior career*
Years	Team	Apps	(Gls)
2006–2009	Flamengo	9	(0)
2008	→ Macaé (Loan)	14	(?)
2009	→ Social (Loan)	11	(0)
2009	Botafogo-DF	14	(0)
2010	Figueirense	5	(?)
2011	Democrata	6	(0)
2011	Formosa	7	(0)
2011–2012	Duque de Caxias	16	(0)
2012	Al-Shabab	9	(0)
2013–2014	Al-Musannah	?	(1)
2014–2015	Teteks	2	
2015	CRAC		
2016	Villa Nova AC		
2017	Portuguesa (RJ)		
2017	Olaria		
2017–2018	Sporting Viana (Portugal)		
2018	Canto do Rio FC		
- * Club domestic league appearances and goals

Márcio José Lisboa Fortes Filho commonly known as Marcinho Pitbull (born 8 June 1987) is a Brazilian footballer.

== Club career ==
=== Brazil ===
The defensive midfielder began playing football at the age of nine and only at the age of ten he arrived at Flamengo Club as he caught the attraction of professionals with his speed and marking ability. At Flamengo, he was with the players of generation that were crowned champions of the Campeonato Carioca de Juniores in 2005, 2006 and 2007.

He had his first opportunity as a professional for Flamengo at the end of the 2006 Campeonato Brasileiro Série A. He played the last four games for his club under the leadership of then-manager, Ney Franco.

In 2007, he played several games either under Franco or Joel Santana and continued to train with the club in Estádio da Gávea. At the end of the year, he moved on loan to Macaé FC to play in the 2008 Campeonato Carioca.

After a brief loan spell at Macaé, he returned to Flamengo but did not make any appearance. In early 2009, he was loaned to Social FC so that he could play some matches before his contract expires. As of then he was a free-agent, he signed a contract with Botafogo FC. Together with the other red-blacks, he played and the club won the runners-up trophy in the Second Division Campeonato Candanguense 2009.

In 2010, he signed a contract with Figueirense but the club at the end of the season got relegated to the Campeonato Brasileiro Série B.

In 2011, he played four matches for Democrata SC and the same number of matches for Formosa SC. In the same year, he moved to Duque de Caxias FC and played in a total of three matches in the 2011 Campeonato Carioca.

=== Oman ===
In 2012, he made his first move away from Brazil to the Middle East and more accurately to Oman where he signed a six-months contract with Al-Shabab Club. At the end of the season in January 2013, he signed a contract with Al-Musannah SC.

=== Republic of Macedonia ===
On 15 August 2014, he made his first move to Europe, more accurately to the Republic of Macedonia, where he signed a one-year contract with FK Teteks.

== Honours ==
=== Club ===
- With Flamengo
  - Campeonato Carioca de Juniores (3) : 2005, 2006, 2007
  - Copa Cultura (1): 2005
  - Copa Record (1) : 2005
  - Taça Otávio Pinto Guimarães (1) : 2006
  - Copa do Brasil (1) : 2006
  - Taça Guanabara (1) : 2007
  - Campeonato Carioca (1) : 2007
