= Ceilândia Esporte Clube =

Brazilian association football club based in Ceilândia, Distrito Federal, Brazil

Ceilândia
- Full name: Ceilândia Esporte Clube
- Nickname: Gato Preto (Black Cat)
- Founded: 25 August 1979; 47 years ago
- Ground: Abadião
- Capacity: 4,000
- President: Ari de Almeida
- Head coach: Marcelo Conte
- League: Campeonato Brasileiro Série D Campeonato Brasiliense
- 2025 2025: Série D, 11th of 64; Brasiliense, 3rd of 10
- Website: ceilandiaec1979.com
Home colors	Away colors	Third colors

Ceilândia Esporte Clube, commonly referred to as Ceilândia, is a Brazilian football club based in Ceilândia, Distrito Federal. Founded in 1979, it competes in the Campeonato Brasileiro Série D, the fourth tier of Brazilian football, as well as in the Campeonato Brasiliense, the top flight of the Distrito Federal state football league.

Ceilândia is the second-best ranked team from the Federal District in CBF's national club ranking in 2026, at 77th nationally.

== History ==
The club was founded in 1963 as Dom Bosco Esporte Clube by Francisco da Silva and his wife.

Dom Bosco quickly established itself as one of the greatest teams in the city, and football in Distrito Federal began to become professional again from the creation of CEUB. In 1977 the first attempts to professionalize Dom Bosco were made. Finally, on March 27, 1978, Dom Bosco was registered.

On August 25, 1979, at the suggestion of team administrator Maria de Lourdes Abadia, the team's name was changed from Dom Bosco Esporte Clube to Ceilândia Esporte Clube. The black and white colors of Dom Bosco were maintained, but the logo was changed, and the team became professional.

The club's first professional match was played on 18 November 1979, losing 2-1 against the most important club in Distrito Federal at the time: Brasília.

Ceilandia's debut in national championship came in 1989; that year, the club earned a spot in the Campeonato Brasileiro Série B by winning the third round of the Metropolitan championship. Ceilandia managed to advance to the 2nd phase by finishing runner-up in its group, but was eliminated 1-0 on aggregate by Rio Branco-AC, and finished the championship in the 30th place out of 96 teams.

In the 2003 state league, Ceilandia finished 7th out of 12, but were able to access the country's third division for the first time in its history, the 2004 Campeonato Brasileiro Série C, due to a selection process by the state's federation. In its first campaign, the club finished 25th out of 60, qualifying out of the first stage by finishing runner-up in its group, and then. being eliminated by Catalano 4-3 on aggregate. The club did much better the following season, topping their group and knocking out Nova Esperança and Londrina before losing to Ipatinga in the quarter-final 2-1 on aggregate and finishing 7th.

Ceilandia's first state title was the 2010 Campeonato Brasiliense, beating Brasiliense 5-3 on aggregate. Ceilandia won the first leg 3-1. In the second leg, they were 2-0 down with 25 minutes to go, but scored two goals in 5 minutes to secure their first title. Ceilandia ended Brasiliense's streak of 6 consecutive titles, and earned a spot in the 2010 Campeonato Brasileiro Série D and the 2011 Copa do Brasil with the title.

The club won its second state title in 2012. The tournament was divided into two stages, with Ceilandia making the final in the first stage and losing 3-2 to Luziânia. In the second stage, Ceilandia made the finals again and beat Sobradinho 4-1. A rematch was played with Luziania for the championship finals, with Ceilandia winning the first leg 1-0 and Luziania winning the second leg 1-0, but due to Ceilandia's better overall performance they won the title.

Ceilandia had good performances in the state league in 2021 and 2022, finishing runner-up both times. The runner-up finish in 2022 gave the club a spot in the 2023 Serie D, where the club had a great campaign, finishing 11th out of 64. They began the campaign by topping their group undefeated, a feat only duplicated by champion Ferroviario. In the next stage they beat Vitória (ES), but then lost on penalties to Caxias do Sul.

Gato Preto won its third state title in 2024, finishing second in the first phase with 6 wins, 2 draws and 1 loss and qualifying to the final phase. In that phase, Ceilandia eliminated Gama 4-3 on aggregate to qualify for the finals, where they beat Capital on penalties after a 1-1 draw on aggregate.

== Stadium ==
Ceilândia play their home games at Abadião, which has a capacity of 4,000 people.

== Honours ==
- Campeonato Brasiliense
  - Winners (3): 2010, 2012, 2024
  - Runners-up (5): 2005, 2016, 2017, 2021, 2022
- Campeonato Brasiliense Second Division
  - Winners (1): 1998
