= Grêmio Esportivo Tiradentes =

Tiradentes
- Full name: Grêmio Esportivo Tiradentes
- Founded: February 3, 1967
- Dissolved: 2001
- Ground: Ceilândia, DF
- Capacity: 30,000
Home colors	Away colors

Grêmio Esportivo Tiradentes, commonly known as Tiradentes, was a Brazilian football team, based in city of Ceilândia, in the Distrito Federal, founded in 1967 and dissolved circa 2001. The winner of the Championship of the Federal District of 1988 competed five times in the Série C and once in the Série B and in the Copa do Brasil. For a short time, the club was known as Flamengo Esportivo Tiradentes de Brasília.

== History ==
The club was founded on February 3, 1967. Tiradentes won the Campeonato Brasiliense in 1988. The club competed in the Série C in 1988, when they reached the Third Stage, in 1992, when they were eliminated in the First Stage, in 1993, when they gained promotion to the 1994 Série B, and in 1995, when they were eliminated in the First Stage of that season's Série C. They were eliminated in the Second Round of the 1989 Copa do Brasil by Sport Club Corinthians Paulista. Tiradentes competed in the Série B in 1994, when they were eliminated in the First Stage of the competition and relegated. The club competed in the Série C in 1995, when they were eliminated in the First Stage of the competition. Between 1995 and 1996, due to a partnership with Clube de Regatas do Flamengo, the club was renamed to Flamengo Esportivo Tiradentes de Brasília. Tiradentes eventually folded.

== Honours ==
=== State ===
- Campeonato Brasiliense
  - Winners (1): 1988
  - Runners-up (1): 1992

=== Women's Football ===
- Campeonato Brasiliense de Futebol Feminino
  - Winners (1): 1997

== Stadium ==
Grêmio Esportivo Tiradentes played their home games at Serejão. The stadium has a maximum capacity of 30,000 people.

== References and notes ==
- José Ricardo Almeida: Clubes de Brasília: Tiradentes, Almanaque do Futebol Brasíliense, 27 November 2012.
