= Campeonato Brasiliense Second Division =

Football league in Brazil

- Organising body: FFDF
- Founded: 1960; 66 years ago
- Country: Brazil
- State: (Federal District (Brazil)) Distrito Federal
- Level on pyramid: 2
- Promotion to: Campeonato Brasiliense
- Current champions: ARUC (1st title) (2025)
- Most championships: Paranoá, Samambaia, Sobradinho (3 titles each)
- Website: FFDF Official website

The Campeonato Brasiliense Second Division is the second tier of the professional state football league in the Brazilian Federal District. It is run by the Federal District Football Federation (FFDF).

== List of champions ==
Season	Champions	Runners-up
1960	Sobradinho (1)	Real de Brasília
1961	Guanabara (1)	Colombo
1962	Not held	
1963	Dínamo (1)	Luziânia
1964–1996	Not held	
1997	Unaí Itapuã (1)	Taguatinga EC
1998	Ceilândia (1)	Brazlândia
1999	Bosque Formosa (1)	Comercial Bandeirante
2000	Brasiliense (1)	ARUC
2001	Brasília (1)	CFZ
2002	Dom Pedro II (1)	Unaí Itapuã
2003	Sobradinho (2)	Paranoá
2004	Paranoá (1)	Santa Maria
2005	Capital (1)	Ceilandense
2006	Esportivo Guará (1)	Samambaia
2007	Brazlândia (1)	Legião
2008	Brasília (2)	Luziânia
2009	Ceilandense (1)	Botafogo
2010	CFZ (1)	Bosque Formosa
2011	Brazlândia (2)	Sobradinho
2012	Unaí Itapuã (2)	Brasília
2013	Bosque Formosa (2)	Santa Maria
2014	Samambaia (1)	Cruzeiro
2015	CA Taguatinga (1)	SE Planaltina
2016	Dom Pedro II (2)	Paranoá
2017	Bolamense (1)	Samambaia
2018	Capital (2)	Taguatinga EC
2019	Paranoá (2)	Ceilandense
2020	Samambaia (2)	Santa Maria
2021	Paranoá (3)	Brasília
2022	Samambaia (3)	Real Brasília
2023	Ceilandense (2)	Planaltina EC
2024	Sobradinho (3)	Legião
2025	ARUC (1)	Brasília

Names change

- Esportivo Guará changed their name to Botafogo, in honor of Botafogo FR.
- Comercial Bandeirante changed their name to CA Bandeirante, and then to CA Taguatinga. In 2018, CA Taguatinga merged with Taguatinga EC.
- Dom Pedro II is the currently Real Brasília.
- Unaí Itapuã is the currently Unaí EC.
- Bolamense FC is the currently Riacho City FC.
- CFZ Brasília is the currently Candango EC.

== Titles by team ==
Teams in bold stills active.

Rank	Club	Winners	Winning years
1	**Paranoá**	3	2004, 2019, 2021
1	**Samambaia**	3	2014, 2020, 2022
1	**Sobradinho**	3	1960, 2003, 2024
3	**Bosque Formosa**	2	1999, 2013
3	**Brasília**	2	2001, 2008
3	**Brazlândia**	2	2007, 2011
3	**Capital**	2	2005, 2018
3	**Ceilandense**	2	2009, 2023
3	**Real Brasília**	2	2002, 2016
3	**Unaí**	2	1997, 2012
10	**ARUC**	1	2025
10	**Bolamense**	1	2017
10	**Botafogo**	1	2006
10	**Brasiliense**	1	2000
10	CA Taguatinga	1	2015
10	**Ceilândia**	1	1998
10	**CFZ**	1	2010
10	Dínamo	1	1963
10	Guanabara	1	1961

== See also ==
- Campeonato Brasiliense
- Campeonato Brasiliense Third Division
