= 2005 Campeonato Brasileiro Série C =

Campeonato Brasileiro Série C
- Season: 2005
- Dates: 31 July – 20 November
- Champions: Remo (1st title)
- Promoted: Remo; América de Natal
- Matches played: 254
- Goals scored: 697 (2.74 per match)
- Top goalscorer: Paulinho Marília (10 goals)
- Biggest home win: Luverdense 5–0 Ji-Paraná; 31 July; São Raimundo-PA 5–0 Ji-Paraná; 28 August; Serra 5–0 Americano; 3 September
- Biggest away win: Rio Branco-SP 2–5 Villa Nova; 1 October
- Highest attendance: 42,096; Remo 4–1 Tocantinópolis; 18 September
- Lowest attendance: 46; São Raimundo-RR 3–2 São José-AP; 28 August
- Total attendance: 823,838
- Average attendance: 3,322

In 2005, the Campeonato Brasileiro Série C was composed of five rounds. In the first one, the 64 teams were divided in 16 groups of 4 teams each. Teams in each group played against each other in home and away games. The two best ranked teams of each group advanced to the second round, where they were paired 2-by-2 and played home and away games. The 32 teams played such rounds until there were just four teams left. The four eventual finalists were put in a single group, and played against each other in home and away games. América (RN) and Remo (PA) were promoted to the Série B, beating Novo Hamburgo (RS) and Ipatinga (MG).

== Participating teams ==
| Federation | Team | Home city |
|---|---|---|
| (Acre (state)) Acre | Independência | Rio Branco |
| Alagoas | ASA | Arapiraca |
| Alagoas | Coruripe | Coruripe |
| Amapá | São José-AP | Macapá |
| (Amazonas (Brazilian state)) Amazonas | Grêmio Coariense | Coari |
| (Amazonas (Brazilian state)) Amazonas | Nacional | Manaus |
| Bahia | Ipitanga | Senhor do Bonfim |
| Bahia | Juazeiro | Juazeiro |
| Ceará | Ferroviário | Fortaleza |
| Ceará | Icasa | Juazeiro do Norte |
| (Federal District (Brazil)) Distrito Federal | Ceilândia | Ceilândia |
| (Federal District (Brazil)) Distrito Federal | Paranoá | Paranoá |
| Espírito Santo | Estrela do Norte | Cachoeiro do Itapemirim |
| Espírito Santo | Serra | Serra |
| Goiás | Grêmio Inhumense | Inhumas |
| Goiás | Mineiros | Mineiros |
| Maranhão | Imperatriz | Imperatriz |
| Maranhão | Moto Club | São Luís |
| Mato Grosso | Luverdense | Lucas do Rio Verde |
| Mato Grosso | Vila Aurora | Rondonópolis |
| Mato Grosso do Sul | CENE | Campo Grande |
| Mato Grosso do Sul | Operário | Campo Grande |
| Minas Gerais | América Mineiro | Belo Horizonte |
| Minas Gerais | Ipatinga | Ipatinga |
| Minas Gerais | Ituiutaba | Ituiutaba |
| Minas Gerais | Villa Nova | Nova Lima |
| Pará | Abaeté | Abaetetuba |
| Pará | Remo | Belém |
| Pará | São Raimundo-PA | Santarém |
| Paraíba | Nacional de Patos | Patos |
| Paraíba | Treze | Campina Grande |
| (Paraná (state)) Paraná | ADAP | Campo Mourão |
| (Paraná (state)) Paraná | Cianorte | Cianorte |
| (Paraná (state)) Paraná | Iraty | Irati |
| (Paraná (state)) Paraná | Londrina | Londrina |
| Pernambuco | Serrano | Serra Talhada |
| Pernambuco | Vitória-PE | Vitória de Santo Antão |
| Piauí | Parnahyba | Parnaíba |
| Piauí | Piauí | Teresina |
| (Rio de Janeiro (state)) Rio de Janeiro | Americano | Campos dos Goytacazes |
| (Rio de Janeiro (state)) Rio de Janeiro | Cabofriense | Cabo Frio |
| (Rio de Janeiro (state)) Rio de Janeiro | Madureira | Rio de Janeiro |
| (Rio de Janeiro (state)) Rio de Janeiro | Volta Redonda | Volta Redonda |
| Rio Grande do Norte | ABC | Natal |
| Rio Grande do Norte | América de Natal | Natal |
| Rio Grande do Norte | Baraúnas | Mossoró |
| Rio Grande do Sul | Gaúcho | Passo Fundo |
| Rio Grande do Sul | Glória | Vacaria |
| Rio Grande do Sul | Novo Hamburgo | Novo Hamburgo |
| Rondônia | Ji-Paraná | Ji-Paraná |
| Roraima | São Raimundo-RR | Boa Vista |
| (Santa Catarina (state)) Santa Catarina | Hermann Aichinger | Ibirama |
| (Santa Catarina (state)) Santa Catarina | Joinville | Joinville |
| (Santa Catarina (state)) Santa Catarina | Marcílio Dias | Itajaí |
| (São Paulo (state)) São Paulo | América de Rio Preto | São José do Rio Preto |
| (São Paulo (state)) São Paulo | Atlético Sorocaba | Sorocaba |
| (São Paulo (state)) São Paulo | Mogi Mirim | Mogi Mirim |
| (São Paulo (state)) São Paulo | Portuguesa Santista | Santos |
| (São Paulo (state)) São Paulo | Rio Branco-SP | Americana |
| (São Paulo (state)) São Paulo | União São João | Araras |
| Sergipe | Itabaiana | Itabaiana |
| Sergipe | Sergipe | Aracaju |
| Tocantins | Tocantinópolis | Tocantinópolis |

== Stages of the competition ==
=== First stage ===
Group 1 (AC-AM)

| Pos | Team | Pld | W | D | L | GF | GA | GD | Pts | Qualification |
|---|---|---|---|---|---|---|---|---|---|---|
| 1 | (Amazonas (Brazilian state)) Nacional/AM | 4 | 3 | 1 | 0 | 8 | 4 | +4 | **10** | Promoted to the second stage |
| 2 | (Acre (state)) Independência | 4 | 1 | 1 | 2 | 4 | 7 | −3 | **4** | Promoted to the second stage |
| 3 | (Amazonas (Brazilian state)) Grêmio Coariense | 4 | 1 | 0 | 3 | 7 | 8 | −1 | **3** | |

Group 2 (MT-PA-RO)

| Pos | Team | Pld | W | D | L | GF | GA | GD | Pts | Qualification |
|---|---|---|---|---|---|---|---|---|---|---|
| 1 | (Mato Grosso) Vila Aurora | 6 | 3 | 3 | 0 | 12 | 7 | +5 | **12** | Promoted to the second stage |
| 2 | (Pará) São Raimundo/PA | 6 | 2 | 2 | 2 | 12 | 8 | +4 | **8** | Promoted to the second stage |
| 3 | (Mato Grosso) Luverdense | 6 | 2 | 1 | 3 | 12 | 9 | +3 | **7** | |
| 4 | (Rondônia) Ji-Paraná | 6 | 1 | 2 | 3 | 2 | 14 | −12 | **5** | |

Group 3 (AP-PA-RR)

| Pos | Team | Pld | W | D | L | GF | GA | GD | Pts | Qualification |
|---|---|---|---|---|---|---|---|---|---|---|
| 1 | (Pará) Remo | 6 | 4 | 2 | 0 | 14 | 7 | +7 | **14** | Promoted to the second stage |
| 2 | (Pará) Abaeté | 6 | 3 | 1 | 2 | 9 | 6 | +3 | **10** | Promoted to the second stage |
| 3 | (Amapá) São José/AP | 6 | 1 | 2 | 3 | 7 | 10 | −3 | **5** | |
| 4 | (Roraima) São Raimundo/RR | 6 | 1 | 1 | 4 | 6 | 13 | −7 | **4** | |

Group 4 (MA-PI-TO)

| Pos | Team | Pld | W | D | L | GF | GA | GD | Pts | Qualification |
|---|---|---|---|---|---|---|---|---|---|---|
| 1 | (Maranhão) Moto Club | 6 | 3 | 2 | 1 | 8 | 5 | +3 | **11** | Promoted to the second stage |
| 2 | (Tocantins) Tocantinópolis | 6 | 3 | 1 | 2 | 10 | 7 | +3 | **10** | Promoted to the second stage |
| 3 | (Maranhão) Imperatriz | 6 | 2 | 2 | 2 | 6 | 7 | −1 | **8** | |
| 4 | (Piauí) Parnahyba | 6 | 1 | 1 | 4 | 9 | 14 | −5 | **4** | |

Group 5 (CE-PE-PI)

| Pos | Team | Pld | W | D | L | GF | GA | GD | Pts | Qualification |
|---|---|---|---|---|---|---|---|---|---|---|
| 1 | (Ceará) Ferroviário/CE | 6 | 5 | 0 | 1 | 14 | 7 | +7 | **15** | Promoted to the second stage |
| 2 | (Ceará) Icasa | 6 | 3 | 0 | 3 | 9 | 8 | +1 | **9** | Promoted to the second stage |
| 3 | (Pernambuco) Serrano/PE | 6 | 2 | 1 | 3 | 5 | 8 | −3 | **7** | |
| 4 | Piauí | 6 | 1 | 1 | 4 | 1 | 6 | −5 | **4** | |

Group 6 (AL-PB-PE-RN)

| Pos | Team | Pld | W | D | L | GF | GA | GD | Pts | Qualification |
|---|---|---|---|---|---|---|---|---|---|---|
| 1 | (Alagoas) Coruripe | 6 | 5 | 0 | 1 | 14 | 9 | +5 | **15** | Promoted to the second stage |
| 2 | (Rio Grande do Norte) América/RN | 6 | 3 | 0 | 3 | 9 | 5 | +4 | **9** | Promoted to the second stage |
| 3 | (Paraíba) Nacional/PB (Patos) | 6 | 4 | 0 | 2 | 13 | 9 | +4 | **6 (Note: 6 points deducted for fielding an ineligible player (Alisson) against Vitória)** | |
| 4 | (Pernambuco) Vitória/PE | 6 | 0 | 0 | 6 | 3 | 16 | −13 | **0** | |

Notes:

Group 7 (AL-PB-RN)

| Pos | Team | Pld | W | D | L | GF | GA | GD | Pts | Qualification |
|---|---|---|---|---|---|---|---|---|---|---|
| 1 | (Paraíba) Treze | 6 | 4 | 1 | 1 | 14 | 10 | +4 | **13** | Promoted to the second stage |
| 2 | (Rio Grande do Norte) ABC | 6 | 2 | 2 | 2 | 6 | 6 | 0 | **8** | Promoted to the second stage |
| 3 | (Alagoas) ASA | 6 | 2 | 1 | 3 | 5 | 7 | −2 | **7** | |
| 4 | (Rio Grande do Norte) Baraúnas | 6 | 1 | 2 | 3 | 8 | 10 | −2 | **5** | |

Group 8 (BA-SE)

| Pos | Team | Pld | W | D | L | GF | GA | GD | Pts | Qualification |
|---|---|---|---|---|---|---|---|---|---|---|
| 1 | Sergipe | 6 | 4 | 1 | 1 | 12 | 5 | +7 | **13** | Promoted to the second stage |
| 2 | (Sergipe) Itabaiana | 6 | 3 | 1 | 2 | 7 | 6 | +1 | **10** | Promoted to the second stage |
| 3 | (Bahia) Ipitanga | 6 | 2 | 2 | 2 | 9 | 9 | 0 | **8** | |
| 4 | (Bahia) Juazeiro/BA | 6 | 1 | 0 | 5 | 5 | 13 | −8 | **3** | |

Group 9 (ES-MG-RJ)

| Pos | Team | Pld | W | D | L | GF | GA | GD | Pts | Qualification |
|---|---|---|---|---|---|---|---|---|---|---|
| 1 | (Minas Gerais) Ipatinga | 6 | 3 | 1 | 2 | 13 | 7 | +6 | **10** | Promoted to the second stage |
| 2 | (Espírito Santo) Serra | 6 | 3 | 1 | 2 | 11 | 10 | +1 | **10** | Promoted to the second stage |
| 3 | (Rio de Janeiro (state)) Americano | 6 | 2 | 2 | 2 | 7 | 11 | −4 | **8** | |
| 4 | (Espírito Santo) Estrela do Norte | 6 | 1 | 2 | 3 | 6 | 9 | −3 | **5** | |

Group 10 (RJ-SP)

| Pos | Team | Pld | W | D | L | GF | GA | GD | Pts | Qualification |
|---|---|---|---|---|---|---|---|---|---|---|
| 1 | (São Paulo (state)) Atlético Sorocaba | 6 | 2 | 3 | 1 | 11 | 7 | +4 | **9** | Promoted to the second stage |
| 2 | (São Paulo (state)) Mogi Mirim | 6 | 2 | 3 | 1 | 9 | 6 | +3 | **9** | Promoted to the second stage |
| 3 | (Rio de Janeiro (state)) Madureira | 6 | 2 | 2 | 2 | 6 | 8 | −2 | **8** | |
| 4 | (São Paulo (state)) Portuguesa/SP (Santos) | 6 | 2 | 0 | 4 | 5 | 10 | −5 | **6** | |

Group 11 (MS-PR)

| Pos | Team | Pld | W | D | L | GF | GA | GD | Pts | Qualification |
|---|---|---|---|---|---|---|---|---|---|---|
| 1 | (Paraná (state)) Londrina | 6 | 3 | 2 | 1 | 11 | 6 | +5 | **11** | Promoted to the second stage |
| 2 | (Mato Grosso do Sul) CENE | 6 | 3 | 2 | 1 | 10 | 8 | +2 | **11** | Promoted to the second stage |
| 3 | (Paraná (state)) Cianorte | 6 | 2 | 2 | 2 | 6 | 6 | 0 | **8** | |
| 4 | (Mato Grosso do Sul) Operário/MS | 6 | 0 | 2 | 4 | 5 | 12 | −7 | **2** | |

Group 12 (DF-GO)

| Pos | Team | Pld | W | D | L | GF | GA | GD | Pts | Qualification |
|---|---|---|---|---|---|---|---|---|---|---|
| 1 | (Federal District (Brazil)) Ceilândia | 6 | 3 | 1 | 2 | 11 | 7 | +4 | **10** | Promoted to the second stage |
| 2 | (Federal District (Brazil)) Paranoá | 6 | 3 | 0 | 3 | 7 | 8 | −1 | **9** | Promoted to the second stage |
| 3 | (Goiás) Mineiros | 6 | 2 | 3 | 1 | 5 | 4 | +1 | **9** | |
| 4 | (Goiás) Grêmio Inhumense | 6 | 1 | 2 | 3 | 8 | 12 | −4 | **5** | |

Group 13 (MG-SP)

| Pos | Team | Pld | W | D | L | GF | GA | GD | Pts | Qualification |
|---|---|---|---|---|---|---|---|---|---|---|
| 1 | (São Paulo (state)) Rio Branco/SP | 6 | 2 | 3 | 1 | 10 | 9 | +1 | **9** | Promoted to the second stage |
| 2 | (Minas Gerais) Ituiutaba | 6 | 2 | 2 | 2 | 8 | 10 | −2 | **8** | Promoted to the second stage |
| 3 | (São Paulo (state)) União São João | 6 | 2 | 1 | 3 | 14 | 13 | +1 | **7** | |
| 4 | (São Paulo (state)) América/SP | 6 | 1 | 4 | 1 | 11 | 11 | 0 | **7** | |

Group 14 (MG-RJ)

| Pos | Team | Pld | W | D | L | GF | GA | GD | Pts | Qualification |
|---|---|---|---|---|---|---|---|---|---|---|
| 1 | (Minas Gerais) Villa Nova | 6 | 2 | 3 | 1 | 6 | 4 | +2 | **9** | Promoted to the second stage |
| 2 | (Rio de Janeiro (state)) Volta Redonda | 6 | 2 | 3 | 1 | 4 | 3 | +1 | **9** | Promoted to the second stage |
| 3 | (Rio de Janeiro (state)) Cabofriense | 6 | 1 | 3 | 2 | 4 | 5 | −1 | **6** | |
| 4 | (Minas Gerais) América/MG | 6 | 1 | 3 | 2 | 5 | 7 | −2 | **6** | |

Group 15 (PR-RS-SC)

| Pos | Team | Pld | W | D | L | GF | GA | GD | Pts | Qualification |
|---|---|---|---|---|---|---|---|---|---|---|
| 1 | (Rio Grande do Sul) Novo Hamburgo | 6 | 3 | 2 | 1 | 8 | 4 | +4 | **11** | Promoted to the second stage |
| 2 | (Santa Catarina (state)) Joinville | 6 | 3 | 1 | 2 | 9 | 6 | +3 | **10** | Promoted to the second stage |
| 3 | (Paraná (state)) ADAP | 6 | 3 | 0 | 3 | 5 | 8 | −3 | **9** | |
| 4 | (Paraná (state)) Iraty | 6 | 1 | 1 | 4 | 5 | 9 | −4 | **4** | |

Group 16 (RS-SC)

| Pos | Team | Pld | W | D | L | GF | GA | GD | Pts | Qualification |
|---|---|---|---|---|---|---|---|---|---|---|
| 1 | (Rio Grande do Sul) Glória | 6 | 4 | 1 | 1 | 8 | 5 | +3 | **13** | Promoted to the second stage |
| 2 | (Rio Grande do Sul) Gaúcho | 6 | 3 | 0 | 3 | 5 | 5 | 0 | **9** | Promoted to the second stage |
| 3 | (Santa Catarina (state)) Atlético Hermann Aichinger | 6 | 2 | 2 | 2 | 5 | 4 | +1 | **8** | |
| 4 | (Santa Catarina (state)) Marcílio Dias | 6 | 1 | 1 | 4 | 1 | 5 | −4 | **4** | |

=== Second stage ===
In bold, the clubs qualified to the next stage.

- **América (RN)** - Ferroviário (CE) 2-1 3-3
- Serra (ES) - **Atlético Sorocaba (SP)** 4-3 1-2
- CENE (MS) - **Ceilândia (DF)** 1-2 1-1
- Volta Redonda (RJ) - **Rio Branco (SP)** 2-1 0-1
- Independência (AC) - **Vila Aurora (MT)** 2-1 1-3
- Tocantinópolis (TO) - **Remo (PA)** 2-0 1-4
- **Abaeté (PA)** - Moto Club (MA) 1-0 0-1 (pen 5-4)
- Icasa (CE) - **Coruripe (AL)** 1-0 2-6
- Itabaiana (SE) - **Treze (PB)** 1-1 0-4
- **ABC (RN)** - Sergipe (SE) 3-2 0-0
- Mogi Mirim (SP) - **Ipatinga (MG)** 2-2 2-2 (pen 2-4)
- Paranoá (DF) - **Londrina (PR)** 1-0 0-1 (pen 3-4)
- Ituiutaba (MG) - **Villa Nova (MG)** 1-3 0-3
- Gaúcho (RS) - **Novo Hamburgo (RS)** 0-0 1-3
- **Joinville (SC)** - Glória (RS) 3-1 0-0
- São Raimundo (PA) - **Nacional (AM)** 2-2 1-4

=== Third stage ===
In bold, the clubs qualified to the next stage.'

- Vila Aurora (MT) - **Nacional (AM)** 4-3 2-3
- **Villa Nova (MG)** - Rio Branco (SP) 1-0 5-2
- **Remo (PA)** - Abaeté (PA) 1-1 3-2
- Coruripe (AL) - **América (RN)** 1-1 1-3
- ABC (RN) - **Treze (PB)** 1-0 0-1 (pen 4-5)
- **Ipatinga (MG)** - Atlético Sorocaba (SP) 2-0 4-1
- **Ceilândia (DF)** - Londrina (PR) 3-0 1-0
- **Novo Hamburgo (RS)** - Joinville (SC) 1-0 0-1 (pen 4-3)

=== Quarterfinals ===
In bold, the clubs qualified to the next stage.

| Team 1 | Agg. | Team 2 | 1st leg | 2nd leg |
|---|---|---|---|---|
| Ceilândia (Federal District (Brazil)) | 1–2 | (Minas Gerais) **Ipatinga** | 1–2 | 0–0 |
| Nacional (Amazonas (Brazilian state)) | 1–2 | (Pará) **Remo** | 0–2 | 1–0 |
| **América de Natal** (Rio Grande do Norte) | 3–2 | (Paraíba) Treze | 2–0 | 1–2 |
| Villa Nova (Minas Gerais) | 4–5 | (Rio Grande do Sul) **Novo Hamburgo** | 3–3 | 1–2 |

== Final stage ==
| Pos | Team | Pld | W | D | L | GF | GA | GD | Pts | Qualification or relegation |
|---|---|---|---|---|---|---|---|---|---|---|
| 1 | Remo (C, P) | 6 | 3 | 1 | 2 | 7 | 5 | +2 | 10 | Promoted to 2006 Campeonato Brasileiro Série B |
| 2 | América de Natal (P) | 6 | 3 | 1 | 2 | 8 | 7 | +1 | 10 | Promoted to 2006 Campeonato Brasileiro Série B |
| 3 | Ipatinga | 6 | 2 | 3 | 1 | 8 | 7 | +1 | 9 | |
| 4 | Novo Hamburgo | 6 | 1 | 1 | 4 | 8 | 12 | −4 | 4 | |

Source: Bola na Área
Rules for classification: 1) points; 2) wins; 3) goal difference; 4) goals scored; 5) head-to-head results.
(C) Champions; (P) Promoted
