= Paulinho Marília =

Brazilian footballer

Personal information
- Full name: Paulo Francisco Zamaia Matias
- Date of birth: 2 September 1980 (age 46)
- Place of birth: Tupã, Brazil
- Height: 1.80 m (5 ft 11 in)
- Position: Forward

Youth career
- América-SP

Senior career*
Years	Team	Apps	(Gls)
1998–2001	América-SP		
2002	XV de Piracicaba		
2003	CENE		
2004	Delémont		
2004	XV de Piracicaba		
2005	Rio Branco-PR		
2005–2006	América-RN		
2006	Ipatinga		
2006	Ceará		
2007	Nanchang Bayi		
2008	América-RN		
2008	Joinville		
2008	Campinense		
2009	Comercial-SP		
2009	Luverdense		
2009	Sinop		
2010	Luverdense		
2010	CRB		
2010–2011	Cuiabá		
2011	Coruripe		
2011–2012	CSA		
2012	Mixto		
2012	Icasa		
- * Club domestic league appearances and goals as of 16 March 2024

Paulo Francisco Zamaia Matias (born 2 September 1980), better known as Paulinho Marília, is a Brazilian former professional footballer who played as a forward.

== Career ==
Forward, Paulinho Marília stood out as top scorer in Série C in 2005 with América de Natal, in addition to top scorer in the Campeonato Alagoano in 2011 with Coruripe. His last professional club was Icasa in 2012.

== Honours ==
América-RN

- Copa Rio Grande do Norte: 2006

Individual

- 2005 Campeonato Brasileiro Série C top scorer: 10 goals
- 2011 Campeonato Alagoano top scorer: 15 goals
