= Rabello F.C. =

- Full name: Rabello Futebol Clube
- Founded: August 17, 1957
- Dissolved: 1971
Home colors	Away colors

Rabello Futebol Clube, or simply Rabello, was a Brazilian football team, based in Brasília, Federal District.

Founded on August 17, 1957, the team was four times champion of the Campeonato Brasiliense, between 1964 and 1967. Some of the players that played for Rabello were the goalkeeper Zé Valter, the fullback Aderbal, the midfielder Beto and the left winger Arnaldo.

== History ==
The Rabello Futebol Clube, owned by the company Construtora Rabello, which the owner were Marco Paulo Rabello, friend of the ex-president Juscelino Kubitschek and mainly evolved with the construction of Brasília, was one of the first two popular teams in Brasília.

The team was founded on August 17, 1957, in the headquarter of the Construtora Rabello S. A.

Their official colors were black and white. The uniforms were inspired in the Botafogo FR.

== Honours ==
- Campeonato Brasiliense
  - Winners (4): 1964, 1965, 1966, 1967
  - Runners-up (3): 1961, 1963, 1968
