= Unaí Esporte Clube =

Unaí
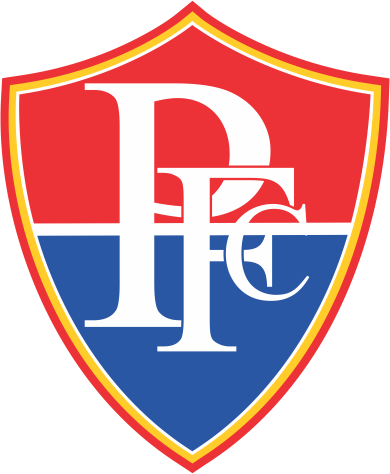
- Full name: Unaí Esporte Clube
- Nickname: Verdão da Serra
- Founded: June 5, 1966; 60 years ago
- Ground: Estádio Urbano Adjuto, Unaí, Minas Gerais, Brazil
- Capacity: 4,000
| Home colors | Away colors |

Unaí Esporte Clube, commonly known as Unaí, is a Brazilian football club based in Unaí, Minas Gerais state. Despite the fact that the club is from Minas Gerais, the club competes in the Campeonato Brasiliense due to its proximity to Brasília city.

== History ==
The club was founded on 5 June 1966, as Unaí Esporte, finishing in the second place in the Campeonato Mineiro Third Level in 1993, after losing the competition to Araguari. Due to financial problems, the club merged with Sociedade Esportiva Itapuã on 3 July 2002, becoming Sociedade Esportiva Unaí Itapuã.

Between 2013 and 2019, the club started to play its games in Paracatu, renaming the team to Paracatu Futebol Clube. In 2020, it changed back to Unaí Esporte Clube.

== Stadium ==
Unaí Esporte Clube plays their home games at Estádio Urbano Adjuto. The stadium has a maximum capacity of 4,000 people.

== See also ==
- Campeonato Brasiliense
- Campeonato Brasiliense Second Division
- Football in Brazil
- Football in Minas Gerais
- Paracatu Futebol Clube
