= Centro de Ensino Unificado de Brasília Esporte Clube =

CEUB
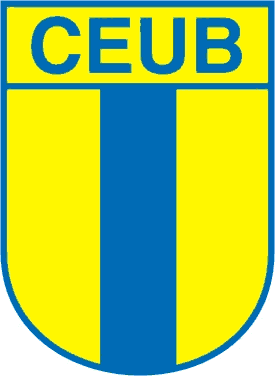
- Full name: Centro de Ensino Unificado de Brasília Esporte Clube
- Founded: 1968
- Dissolved: 1976
- Ground: Pelezão
- Capacity: 20,000
- League: –
Home colours	Away colours

Centro de Ensino Unificado de Brasília Esporte Clube, commonly known as CEUB, were a Brazilian football club from Brasília. They won the Campeonato Brasiliense once and competed in the Série A three times.

== History ==
They were founded in 1968, by college students of Centro de Ensino Unificado de Brasília (UniCEUB). The club won the Campeonato Brasiliense in 1973, when they beat Relações Exteriores in the final. They competed in the Série A in 1973, 1974 and in 1975. CEUB closed their professional football department in 1976 under Adílson Peres' term as the club's president.

== Stadium ==
The club played their home games at the Pelezão stadium. The stadium had a maximum capacity of 20,000 people.

== Honours ==
- Campeonato Brasiliense
  - Winners (1): 1973
  - Runners-up (1): 1972
