= Estádio Zequinha Roriz =

Multi-purpose stadium in Luziânia, Brazil

Coordinates: 16.2466°S 47.9411°W

- Interactive map of Estádio Zequinha Roriz
- Full name: Estádio Zequinha Roriz
- Location: Luziânia, Goiás, Brazil
- Capacity: 22,000
- Surface: Grass

Construction
- Opened: December 13, 1992

Tenant
- Associação Atlética Luziânia

Estádio Zequinha Roriz is a stadium in Luziânia, Brazil. It has a capacity of 22,000 spectators. It is the home of Associação Atlética Luziânia.
