= Legião FC =

Brazilian football club

Legião
- Full name: Legião Futebol Clube
- Nickname(s): Leão; Time do Roqueiros
- Founded: 11 May 2006; 19 years ago
- Ground: Estádio Nacional Mané Garrincha, Brasília, Brazil
- Capacity: 69,349
Home colors	Away colors

Legião Futebol Clube, commonly known as Legião, is a Brazilian football club based in Brasília, Distrito Federal. They competed in the Série C once.

== History ==
The club was founded on May 11, 2006. Legião won the Campeonato Brasiliense Third Level in 2006, after defeating Brasília in the final. They competed in the Série C in 2008, when they were eliminated in the First Stage of the competition. Legião was promoted to the 2012 Campeonato Brasiliense after finishing in the fourth position in the 2011 Campeonato Brasiliense Second Level.

== Achievements ==
- Campeonato Brasiliense Third Division:
  - Winners (1): 2006

== Stadium ==
Legião Futebol Clube play their home games at Estádio Nacional de Brasília, commonly known as Estádio Mané Garrincha. The stadium has a maximum capacity of 69,349 people.
