= Grêmio Esportivo Brazlândia =

Brazlândia
- Full name: Sociedade Esportiva Brazlândia
- Nickname(s): Tricolor da Chapadinha
- Founded: June 5, 1995
- Ground: Estádio Chapadinha, Brazlândia, Distrito Federal, Brazil
- Capacity: 3,000
Home colours	Away colours

Grêmio Esportivo Brazlândia, formerly known as Sociedade Esportiva Brazlândia and commonly known as Brazlândia, is a Brazilian football club based in Brazlândia, Distrito Federal.

== History ==
The club was founded on June 5, 1996. Brazlândia won the Campeonato Brasiliense Second Level in 2007.

== Achievements ==
- Campeonato Brasiliense Second Division:
  - Winners (2): 2007, 2011

== Stadium ==
Sociedade Esportiva Brazlândia play their home games at Estádio Chapadinha. The stadium has a maximum capacity of 3,000 people.
