= Football in Minas Gerais =

Football in the Minas Gerais state of Brazil

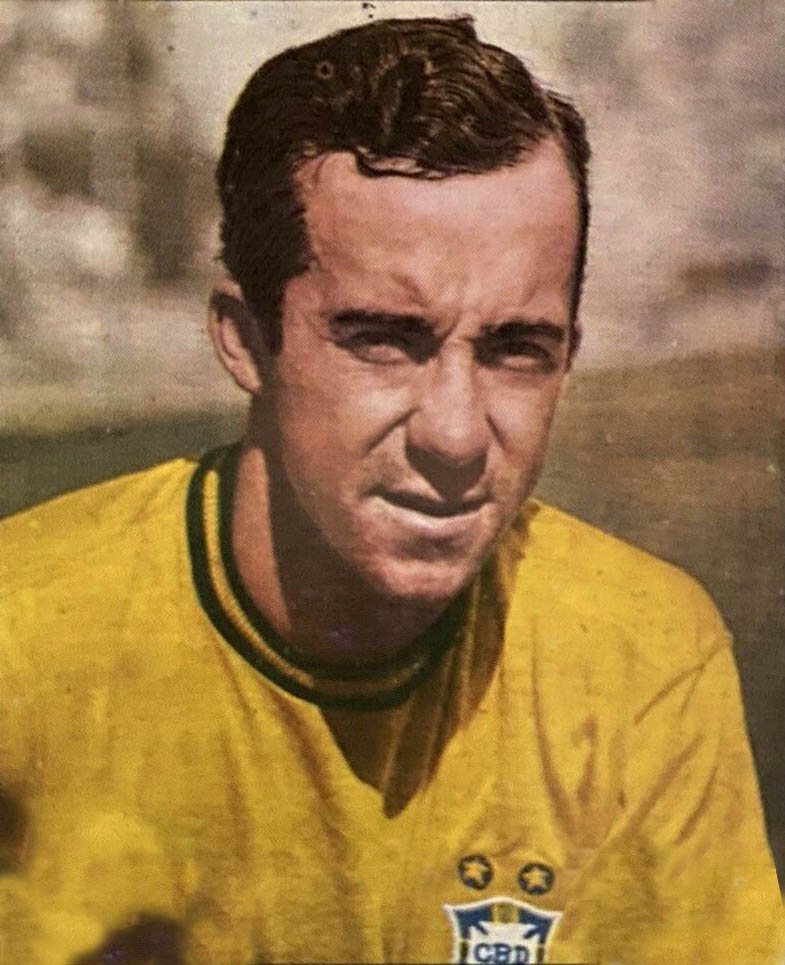
Tostão, a famous player for Cruzeiro.

Football was introduced in Minas Gerais in the beginning of the 20th century by Englishmen who worked for railways. It is currently the most popular sport in the state.

== Popularity ==
The most relevant football clubs in the state of Minas Gerais are Clube Atlético Mineiro, Cruzeiro Esporte Clube and América Futebol Clube.

== History of football in Minas Gerais ==
The first club in Belo Horizonte founded for the practice of football was the Sport Club Foot-Ball, founded on June 10, 1904, with its fuores playing the first match between its two cadres on October 3 of this year, led by a carioca, Vítor Serpa, who had studied in Switzerland, where he had his first contacts with football.

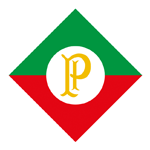
Cruzeiro's first logo was inspired by the colors if Italy.

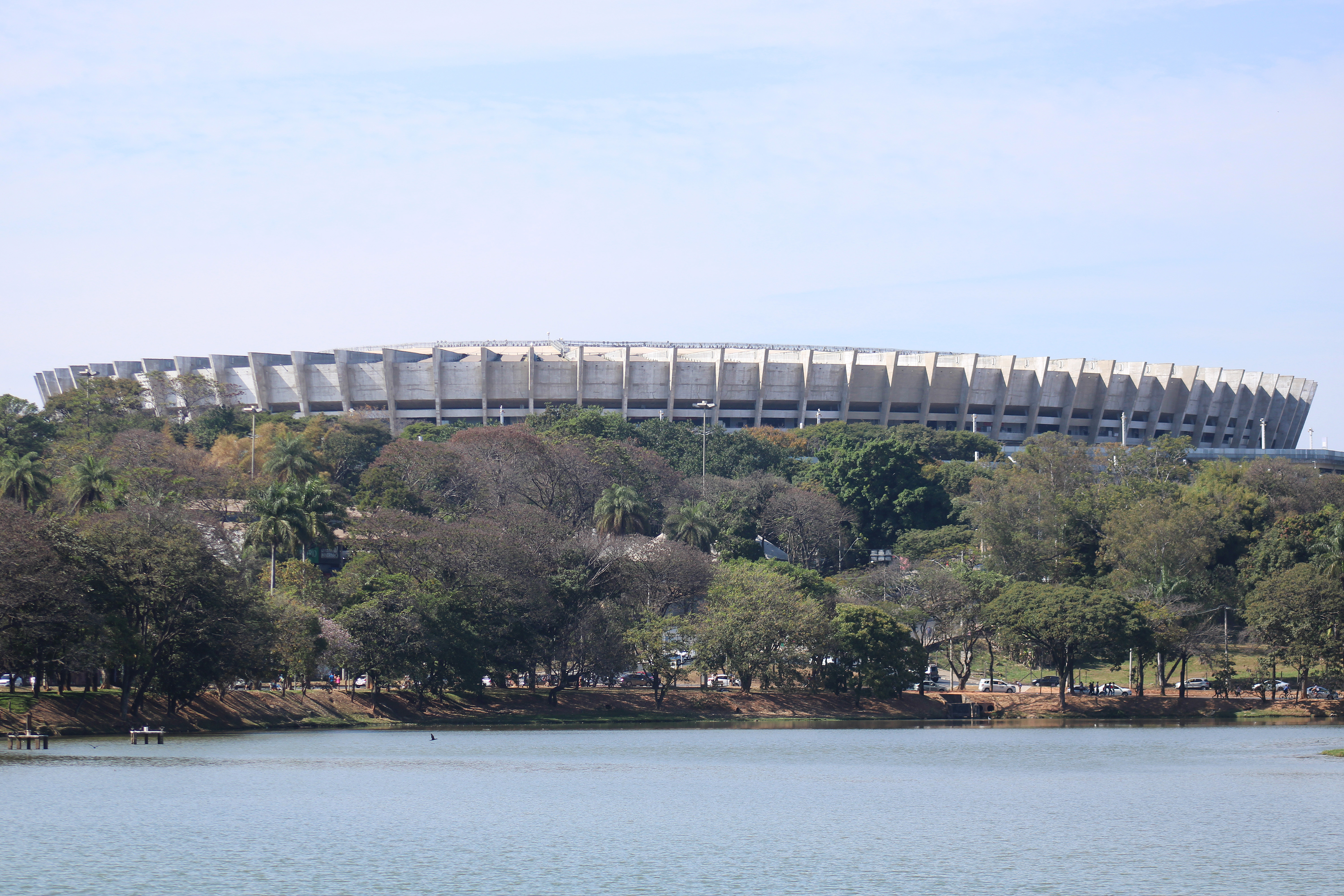
Mineirão stadium in Belo Horizonte.

In the wake of this initiative, two other clubs emerged, the Plínio Foot-Ball Club and the Atlético Mineiro, which should not be confused with the club of the same name and the first club that prospered and remains active to this day, and which was founded on March 25, 1908, by ten middle-class students, eight civil servants, three goldsmiths, a merchant, a printer and a traveller, two of them English and one Italian. In September 1913 was inaugurated by América Futebol Clube, founded on April 30, 1912, by students from the elite of this city, the first football field in Belo Horizonte, where the Central Market currently operates. Over the years, America would establish itself as the representative of the local elite.

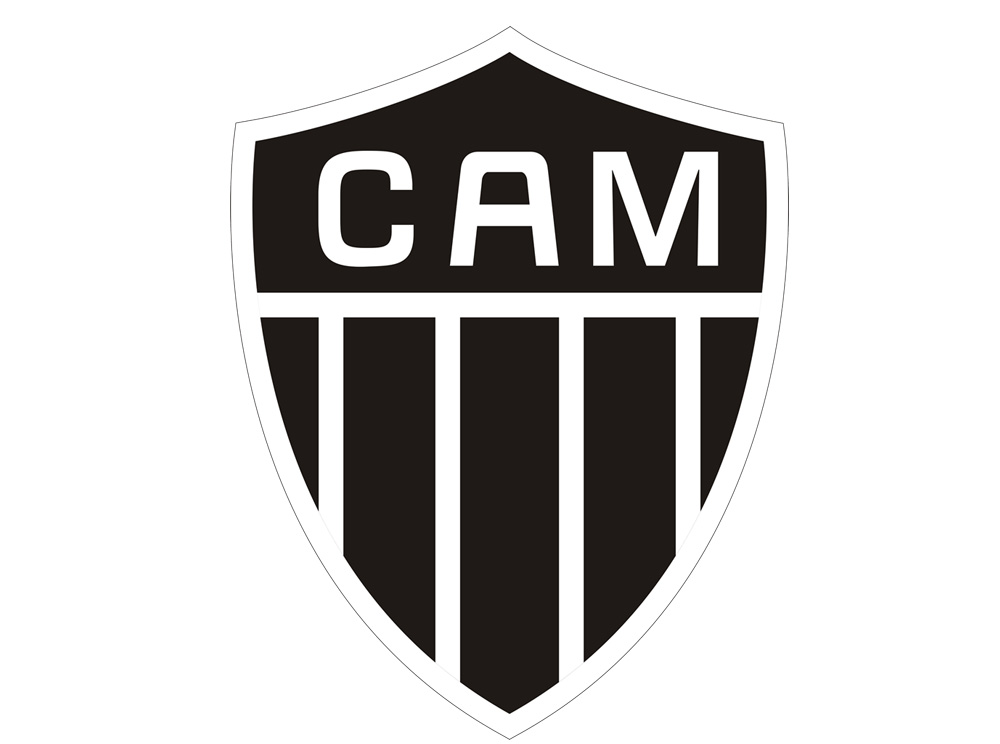
Atlético Mineiro's 1920 logo.

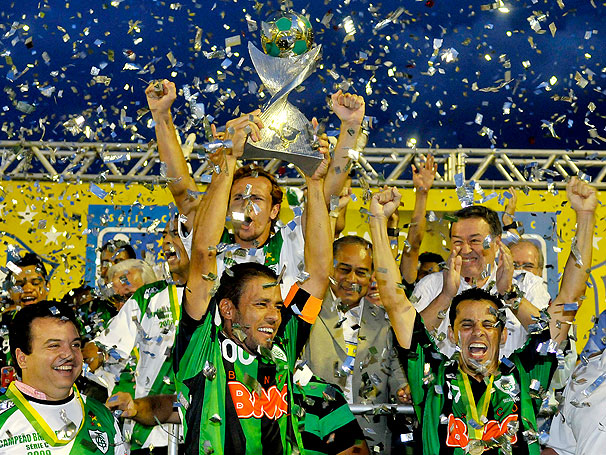
América Mineiro was champion of the Serie C in 2009.

In 1914 a football league was founded in the city of Juiz de Fora, which would later organize the only city championship in a city in the interior for several years. Since 1904, news has appeared in the press about football matches in Juiz de Fora, although more clearly, only from 1907. Granbery College Minutes, 1893, point to the holding of an internal tournament. On May 12, 1912, a match was played between Granberyense de Juiz de Fora and Clube Atlético Mineiro, in Belo Horizonte, with the former winning 5–1. Having been held another match in Juiz de Fora on September 7, with victory of the home team by 3 to 0, which demonstrates the strength of the football of the city of Juiz de Fora at that time.

Third among the great clubs of Belo Horizonte in activity to be founded, the Cruzeiro Esporte Clube appeared in the Minas Gerais football scene on January 2, 1921, through an initiative of sportsmen from the Italian colony, still with the name of Societá Sportiva Palestra Italia, with the club opening up to all ethnicities with the passage of time. In the social body of the Palestra, men of the profession of masons, policemen, painters, merchants and carpenters prevailed, residents from outside the perimeter of Avenida do Contorno, where the first suburb of the capital of Minas Gerais was formed.
