= Capital CF =

Brazilian football club (founded 2005)

- Full name: Capital Clube de Futebol
- Nickname: Corujão
- Founded: 5 July 2005; 21 years ago
- Ground: Estádio JK, Paranoá, Distrito Federal, Brazil
- Capacity: 10,000
- League: Campeonato Brasileiro Série D Campeonato Brasiliense
- 2025 2025: Série D, 41st of 64; Brasiliense, 2nd of 10
Home colours	Away colours

Capital Clube de Futebol, known in English as Capital CF, is a Brazilian football club based in Paranoá, Distrito Federal. The club was formerly known as Sociedade Esportiva Maringá and Capital/Cristalina.

== History ==
The club was founded on 5 July 2005, as Sociedade Esportiva Maringá. They won the Campeonato Brasiliense Second Level in 2005, after they defeated Ceilandense in the final. Capital won the Campeonato Brasiliense Third Level in 2009, after they defeated Bosque Formosa in the final. Capital joined a partnership with Goiás state club Cristalina Futebol Clube in August 2011, and adopted the name Capital/Cristalina. They changed the name back to Capital CF in the end of the year.

Between 2017 and 2019, the team had a partnership with Clube Desportivo Futebol Universidade de Brasília and used the name Capital/UNB.

In 2024, the team has reached the finals of the Campeonato Brasiliense for the first time after defeating Brasiliense on the semifinals, qualifying for the 2025 seasons of Campeonato Brasileiro Série D, Copa Verde and Copa do Brasil.

The team's main rival is Legião FC, who plays the "Clássico do Rock" (Rock and Roll Derby) with them. The name is related to two popular bands originated in Brasília, Capital Inicial and Legião Urbana.

== Honours ==
=== State ===
- Campeonato Brasiliense
  - Runners-up (1): 2024, 2025
- Campeonato Brasiliense Second Division
  - Winners (2): 2005, 2018
- Campeonato Brasiliense Third Division
  - Winners (1): 2009

=== Women's Football ===
- Campeonato Brasiliense de Futebol Feminino
  - Winners (1): 2013

== Stadium ==
Capital Clube de Futebol play some home games at Estádio Nacional de Brasília, commonly known as Estádio Mané Garrincha. The stadium has a maximum capacity of 72,200 people. They also play home games at JK Stadium. The stadium has a maximum capacity of 10,000 people.
