= Samambaia Futebol Clube =

Samambaia
- Full name: Samambaia Futebol Clube
- Nickname: Wieners
- Founded: 29 January 1993; 32 years ago
- Ground: Estádio Joaquim Domingos Roriz
- Capacity: 6,400
- President: José Ramos
- Head coach: Luís dos Reis
- League: Campeonato Brasiliense
- 2024: Brasiliense, 7th of 10
- Website: https://www.lojasamambaiafc.com.br/
Home colors	Away colors

Samambaia Futebol Clube, simply known as Samambaia, is a Brazilian football club based in Samambaia, Federal District.

== History ==
The club was founded in 1993, entering professional football in 1994. It has spent most of its history playing between licensed. In 2014 the club won its first title in the second division, but was unable to remain in the elite for a long time, withdrew from championship contention just a year later. Samambaia won the second level once time in 2020, and in 2022, after being relegated again.

Still in 2022, it adopted a visual change, adopting the dachshund dog (wiener) as a symbol.

== Honours ==
- Campeonato Brasiliense Second Division
  - Winners (3): 2014, 2020, 2022

== Appearances ==
Following is the summary of Samambaia appearances in Campeonato Brasiliense.

Season	Division	Final position
2014	2nd	1st
2015	1st	Withdrew
2015	Did not play	
2017	2nd	2nd
2018	1st	12th (relegated)
2019	2nd	10th
2020	2nd	1st
2021	1st	10th (relegated)
2022	2nd	1st
2023	1st	7th
2024	1st	7th
2025	1st	7th
