= Paranoá Esporte Clube =

Paranoá
- Full name: Paranoá Esporte Clube
- Founded: April 30, 2000
- Ground: Estádio JK, Paranoá, Distrito Federal, Brazil
- Capacity: 6,000
Home colours	Away colours	colours

Paranoá Esporte Clube, commonly known as Paranoá, is a Brazilian football club based in Paranoá, Distrito Federal. They competed in the Série C in once.

== History ==
The club was founded on April 4, 2000. Paranoá won the Campeonato Brasiliense Second Level in 2004. They competed in the Série C in 2005, when they were eliminated in the Second Stage by Londrina.

== Achievements ==
- Campeonato Brasiliense Second Division:
  - Winners (3): 2004, 2019, 2021

== Stadium ==
Paranoá Esporte Clube play their home games at Estádio JK Paranoá, nicknamed Estádio JK. The stadium has a maximum capacity of 6,000 people.
