= Clube Atlético Taguatinga =

Taguatinga
- Full name: Clube Atlético Taguatinga
- Nickname(s): Taguá; Jaguar
- Founded: October 15, 1984 (40 years ago)
- Dissolved: July 25, 2018 (merged with Taguatinga Esporte Clube)
- Ground: Metropolitana; Núcleo Bandeirante, DF
- Capacity: 3,000
Home colors	Away colors

Clube Atlético Taguatinga, commonly known as Atlético Taguatinga, or even Taguatinga, was a Brazilian football club based in Núcleo Bandeirante, in Distrito Federal. They competed in the Série A and in the Copa do Brasil once. The club was formerly known as Associação Desportiva Comercial Bandeirante Until 2015, the club was known as Clube Atlético Bandeirante, commonly known as Bandeirante.

== History ==
The club was founded on February 15, 1981, as Associação Desportiva Comercial Bandeirante, eventually being renamed to Clube Atlético Bandeirante. Bandeirante finished in the second position in the 2000 Campeonato Brasiliense, losing the competition to Gama. The club competed in the same year in the Série A, named Copa João Havelange, being eliminated in the First Stage in the Yellow Group. They competed in the Copa do Brasil in 2002, when they were eliminated in the First Round by Cruzeiro. The club was renamed to Clube Atlético Taguatinga in 2015.

== Stadium ==
Clube Atlético Taguatinga play their home games at Estádio Vasco Viana de Andrade, nicknamed Estádio Metropolitana. The stadium has a maximum capacity of 3,000 people.
