= Bosque Formosa Esporte Clube =

Formosa
- Full name: Bosque Formosa Esporte Clube
- Nicknames: Bosque Formosa; Tsunami do Cerrado; Forasteiro Atrevido
- Founded: September 21, 1978
- Ground: Diogão, Formosa, Goiás state, Brazil
- Capacity: 8,000
- Owner: Cacildo Cassiano
- Head coach: Émerson Matheus
- League: Campeonato Brasileiro Série D
- 2011: Série D, 30th
Home colors	Away colors

Bosque Formosa Esporte Clube, commonly known as Formosa, is a Brazilian football club based in Formosa, Goiás state. Despite the fact that the club is from Goiás, the club competes in the Campeonato Brasiliense due to its proximity to Brasília city. The club was formerly known as Bosque Esporte Clube and Formosa Esporte Clube.

== History ==
The club was founded on September 21, 1978, as Bosque Esporte Clube, being renamed to Bosque Formosa Esporte Clube in the 2000s, and to Formosa Esporte Clube in 2008. They won the Campeonato Brasiliense Second Level in 1999. The club eventually adopted again the name Bosque Formosa Esporte Clube. They finished as runners-up in the Campeonato Brasiliense Second Level in 2010, thus gaining promotion to the 2011 Campeonato Brasiliense.

== Rivaries ==
The club's main historic rival is Goiás Esporte Clube due to the fact that both clubs are based in Goiás and are neighboring teams.

== Achievements ==
- Campeonato Brasiliense Second Division:
  - Winners (2): 1999, 2013

== Stadium ==
Bosque Formosa Esporte Clube play their home games at Estádio Diogo Francisco Gomes, nicknamed Diogão. The stadium has a maximum capacity of 8,000 people.
