= Taguatinga Esporte Clube =

Taguatinga
- Full name: Taguatinga Esporte Clube
- Nickname(s): Águia (The eagle); TEC (acronym of Taguatinga Esporte Clube)
- Founded: February 18, 1974
- Ground: Serejão; Taguatinga, DF,
- Capacity: 30,000
- League: –
Home colors	Away colors

Taguatinga Esporte Clube, commonly known as Taguatinga, are a Brazilian football team from Taguatinga, in Distrito Federal. They won the Campeonato Brasiliense five times and competed in the Série A once.

== History ==
They were founded on July 1, 1975. The club won the Campeonato Brasiliense for the first time in 1981. Taguatinga competed in the Série A in 1982, when they finished in the last place of their group, and were relegated to the same year's Série B.

== Stadium ==
They play their home games at the Serejão stadium. The stadium has a maximum capacity of 30,000 people.

== Honours ==
- Campeonato Brasiliense
  - Winners (5): 1981, 1989, 1991, 1992, 1993
  - Runners-up (9): 1962, 1965, 1977, 1978, 1985, 1986, 1987, 1990, 2000
