= Sociedade Atlético Ceilandense =

Brazilian football club

Atlético Ceilandense
- Full name: Sociedade Atlético Ceilandense
- Founded: October 8, 1977
- Ground: Abadião, Ceilândia, Distrito Federal, Brazil
- Capacity: 4,000
Home colors	Away colors	colors

Sociedade Atlético Ceilandense, commonly known as Atlético Ceilandense, is a Brazilian football club based in Ceilândia, Distrito Federal. They competed in the Série C twice. The club was formerly known as Sociedade Esportiva Ceilandense.

== History ==
The club was founded on October 8, 1977, as Sociedade Esportiva Ceilandense. They competed in the Série C in 1997 and in 1995, they had weak performances in both editions of the competition. Ceilandense won the Campeonato Brasiliense Second Division in 2009, after beating Botafogo-DF in the final, and soon after that the club was renamed to Sociedade Atlético Ceilandense, after joining a partnership with Atlético Goianiense of Goiás state.

== Achievements ==
- Campeonato Brasiliense Second Division
  - Champions (2): 2009, 2023

== Stadium ==
Sociedade Atlético Ceilandense play their home games at Estádio Maria de Lurdes Abadia, nicknamed Abadião. The stadium has a maximum capacity of 4,000 people.
