= Serejão =

Brazilian football stadium

Coordinates: 15°50′10″S 48°04′50″W

- Estádio Boca do Jacaré
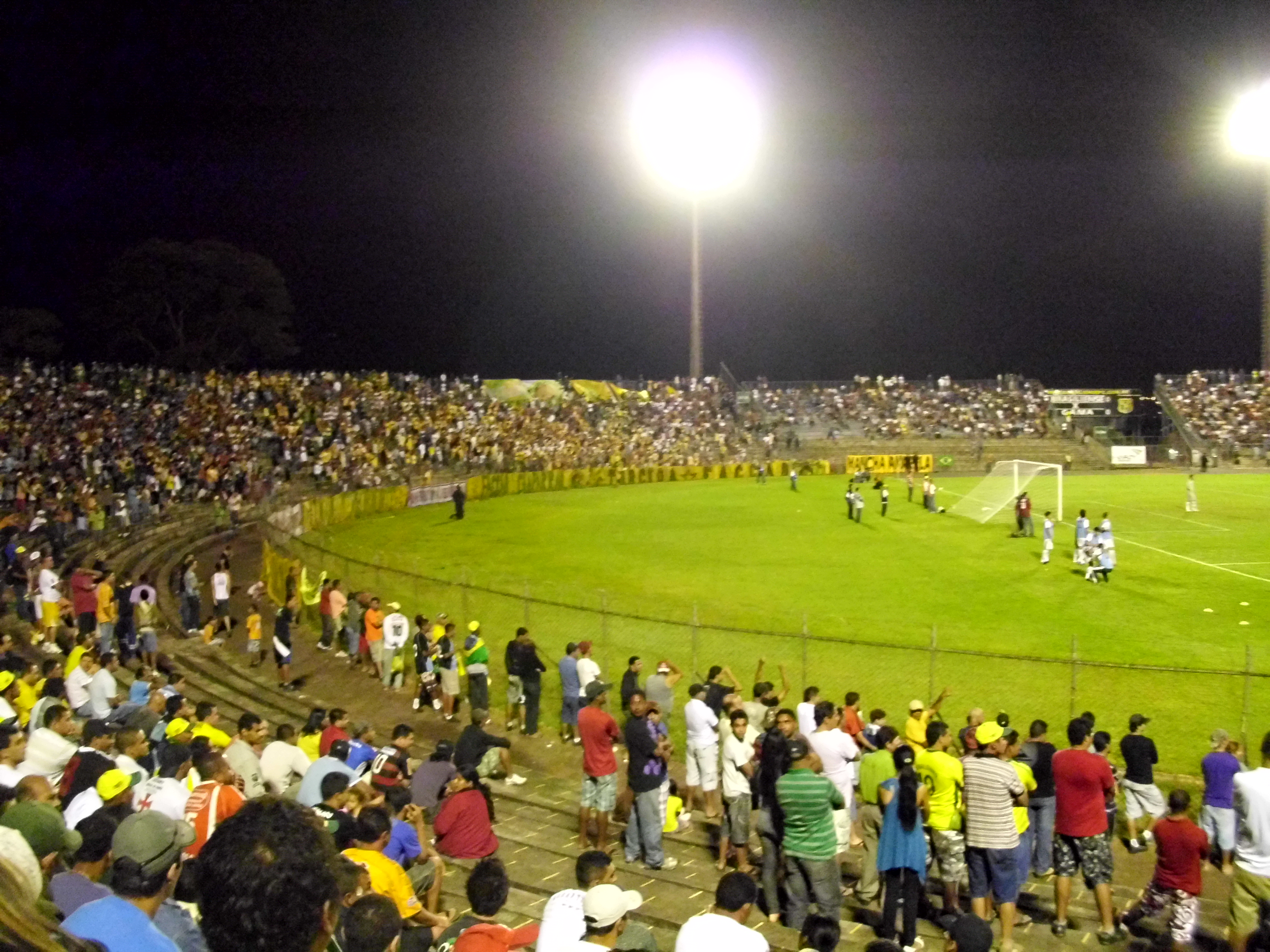
- Sisbrace
- Interactive map of Serejão
- Full name: Estádio Elmo Serejo Farias
- Location: Taguatinga, DF, Brazil
- Owner: Taguatinga Regional Administration and the Distrito Federal Government
- Capacity: 27,000

Construction
- Opened: January 23, 1978

Tenant
- Taguatinga Esporte Clube

The Elmo Serejo Farias Stadium, popularly known as Serejão or, more recently, Boca do Jacaré, is a Brazilian football stadium, located in Taguatinga, in the Distrito Federal. The stadium was built in 1978. The stadium is owned by the Taguatinga Regional Administration and by the Distrito Federal Government and is the home stadium of Taguatinga Esporte Clube and Brasiliense FC.

== Stadium name ==
Its official name honors Elmo Serejo Farias, former Taguatinga administrator and Governor of the Federal District during the stadium's construction.

The nickname Estádio Boca do Jacaré means Alligator's Mouth Stadium, and is a reference to Brasiliense Futebol Clube's nickname.

Serejão means Big Serejo.

== History ==
The inaugural match was played on January 23, 1978, when Taguatinga beat Vila Nova 1-0. The first goal of the stadium was scored by Taguatinga's Dinate.

The stadium's attendance record currently stands at 26,205 people, set on October 5, 2005 when Flamengo beat Brasiliense 3-2.

In 2001, the stadium was remodeled.
