= Associação Botafogo Futebol Clube =

Botafogo-DF
- Full name: Associação Botafogo Futebol Clube
- Nickname(s): Alvinegro candango Fogão DF
- Founded: July 14, 2004 (as Guará); July 14, 2009 (as Botafogo)
- Ground: CAVE; Guará, DF,
- Capacity: 7,000
- President: Walter Thodoro
- Head Coach: Gerson Vieira
- Website: http://botafogo-df.com/
Home colours	Away colours	colours

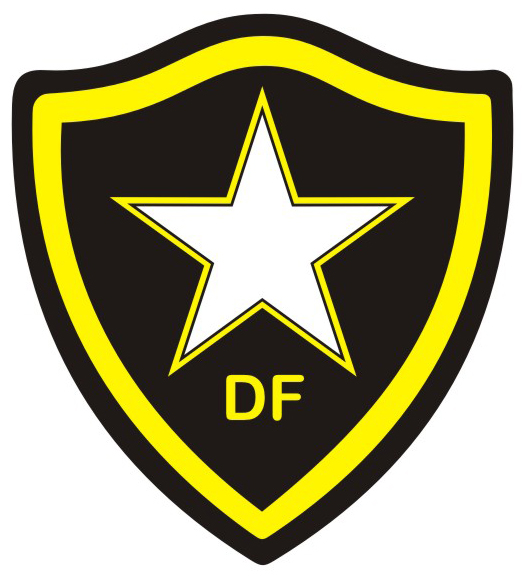

Associação Botafogo Futebol Clube, also known as Botafogo or Botafogo-DF, is a Brazilian football club based in Cristalina, in Goiás. The club was formerly known as Clube Esportivo Guará.

== History ==
The club was founded on July 14, 2004 as Clube Esportivo Guará. The club won the Campeonato Brasiliense Second Level in 2006. It was founded again as Associação Botafogo Futebol Clube on July 14, 2009, after celebrating its five-year birthday and joining a partnership with Botafogo de Futebol e Regatas, adopting the colors and symbols from the Rio de Janeiro club. In its first season, Botafogo-DF finished as runners-up in the Campeonato Brasiliense Second Level gaining promotion to the First Level of the Campeonato Brasiliense, in 2010, even after being defeated 2–1 in the final to Ceilandense.

In 2022, the club moved to the city of Cristalina, at the state of Goiás, leaving the city of Guará.

== Achievements ==
- Campeonato Brasiliense Second Division:
  - Winners (1): 2006
  - Runners-up (1): 2009

== Stadium ==
Associação Botafogo Futebol Clube play their home games at Estádio Antônio Otoni Filho, nicknamed CAVE. The stadium has a maximum capacity of 7,000 people.
