= Associação Atlética Luziânia =

Luziânia
- Full name: Associação Atlética Luziânia
- Nickname: Azulino do Entorno (Blue of Surrounding)
- Founded: December 13, 1926; 99 years ago
- Ground: Estádio Serra do Lago
- Capacity: 21,564
- President: Daniel Vasconcelos
- Head coach: Jairo Araújo
- League: Campeonato Brasiliense Segunda Divisão
- 2025: Brasiliense Segunda Divisão, 5th of 8
- Website: http://www.aaluziania.com.br/
Home colors	Away colors

Associação Atlética Luziânia, commonly known as Luziânia, is a Brazilian football team from Luziânia, Goiás state.

Luziânia is ranked 222nd in CBF's national club ranking, sixth-best among FFDF-affiliated clubs.

== History ==
Founded in 1926, with the name of AA Luziana because the town was called Santa Luzia, having changed his name in 1945 for Luziânia and the club became known as Associação Atlética Luziânia.

The main curiosity about the Club is their affiliation to the Football Association of Federal District, and not the Football Association of Goiás state. The explanation for this fact is related to distances that the club would have to go through to compete in the Campeonato Goiano — from Luziânia to Goiânia are less than 200 km and the distance from the Brasília is only 70.

== Stadium ==
Luziânia play their home games at Estádio Serra do Lago. The stadium has a maximum capacity of 21,564 people.

== Honours ==
=== State ===
- Campeonato Brasiliense
  - Winners (2): 2014, 2016
  - Runners-up (1): 2012

=== Women's Football ===
- Campeonato Brasiliense de Futebol Feminino
  - Winners (1): 2006
