= Sobradinho Esporte Clube =

Sobradinho
- Full name: Sobradinho Esporte Clube
- Nicknames: Alvinegro (White and Black); Leão da Serra (Sierra Lion)
- Founded: 1 January 1975; 51 years ago
- Ground: Estádio Augustinho Lima
- Capacity: 10,000
- President: Washington Borges
- Head coach: Evilásio Peba
- League: Campeonato Brasiliense
- 2025: Brasiliense, 6th of 10
- Website: http://www.sobradinhoesporteclube.com.br/
Home colors	Away colors

Sobradinho Esporte Clube, commonly known as Sobradinho, is a Brazilian football team, based in city of Sobradinho, in the Distrito Federal. They competed in the Série A once, in the Série B four times and in the Série C once. The club was known as Botafogo Sobradinho Esporte Clube for a short time.

Sobradinho is the fourth-best ranked team from the Federal District in CBF's national club ranking, at 179th overall.

== History ==
The club was founded on January 1, 1975. They won the Campeonato Brasiliense in 1985, and in 1986. Sobradinho competed in the Série B in 1985, when they were eliminated in the First Stage by Americano. The club competed in the Série B in 1986, qualifying to compete in that year's Série A, when they were eliminated in the Second Stage. They competed again in the Série B in 1987, when they were eliminated in the First Stage. Sobradinho was eliminated in the First Stage in the Série B in 1989. They competed in the Série C in 1996, when they were eliminated in the Second Round by Mixto. The club joined a partnership with Botafogo de Futebol e Regatas on March 1, 1996, thus being renamed to Botafogo Sobradinho Esporte Clube. After a few years, the partnership ended, and the club was renamed back to Sobradinho Esporte Clube. Sobradinho won the Campeonato Brasiliense Second Level in 2003.

== Honours ==
- Campeonato Brasiliense
  - Winners (3): 1985, 1986, 2018
  - Runners-up (4): 1984, 1989, 1994, 2026
- Campeonato Brasiliense Second Division
  - Winners (1): 2003

== Stadium ==
Sobradinho Esporte Clube play their home games at Augustinho Pires de Lima. The stadium has a maximum capacity of 15,000 people.
