= Federação de Futebol do Distrito Federal =

Brazilian football state federation

- Formation: 16 March 1959; 67 years ago
- Type: List of international sport federations
- Headquarters: Brasília, DF, Brazil
- Official language: Portuguese
- Website: www.ffdf.com.br

The Federação de Futebol do Distrito Federal (English: Football Association of Federal District) was founded on March 16, 1959, and it manages all the official football tournaments within the Brazilian Federal District, which are the Campeonato Brasiliense and the Campeonato Brasiliense lower levels, and represents the clubs at the Brazilian Football Confederation (CBF).

== Current clubs in Brasileirão ==
List of clubs from Distrito Federal competing in the 2024 season across the Brazilian football league system.

Club	City
Série D
Brasiliense	Taguatinga
Real Brasília	Brasília
