= Campeonato Brasiliense =

Football league in Brazil

- Organising body: FFDF
- Founded: 1959; 67 years ago (as an amateur semi-professional league); 1976; 50 years ago (as the professional Campeonato Brasiliense)
- Country: Brazil
- State: (Federal District (Brazil)) Distrito Federal
- Level on pyramid: 1
- Relegation to: Campeonato Brasiliense Second Division
- Domestic cup(s): Copa Verde; Copa do Brasil
- Current champions: Gama (15th title) (2026)
- Most championships: Gama (15 titles)
- Website: FFDF Official website

The Campeonato Brasiliense, also referred to as the Campeonato Candango and the Candangão, is the top-flight professional state football league in the Brazilian Federal District. It is run by the Federal District Football Federation (FFDF).

Teams from other states can be affiliated to the FFDF as long as they are located within 200 km from Brasília. This is the case for Associação Atlética Luziânia from the state of Goiás and Unaí Esporte Clube from the state of Minas Gerais.

== List of champions ==
=== Amateur semi-professional era ===
Season	Champions	Runners-up
1959	Grêmio Brasiliense (1)	Planalto
1960	Defelê (1)	Guará
1961	Defelê (2)	Rabello
1962	Defelê (3)	Colombo
1963	Cruzeiro do Sul (1)	Colombo
1964	Rabello (1)	Defelê
1964	Guanabara (1)	Dínamo
1965	Rabello (2)	Colombo
1965	Pederneiras (1)	Guanabara
1966	Rabello (3)	Luziânia
1966	Guanabara (2)	Vila Matias
1967	Rabello (4)	Cruzeiro do Sul
1968	Defelê (1)	Rabello
1969	Coenge (1)	Grêmio Brasiliense
1970	Grêmio Brasiliense (2)	Civilsan
1971	Colombo (1)	Serviço Gráfico
1972	Serviço Gráfico (1)	CEUB
1973	CEUB (1)	Relações Exteriores
1974	Pioneira (1)	Jaguar
1975	Campineira (1)	CSU

=== Professional era ===
Season	Champions	Runners-up
1976	Brasília (1)	Guará
1977	Brasília (2)	Bandeirante
1978	Brasília (3)	Taguatinga
1979	Gama (1)	Brasília
1980	Brasília (4)	Gama
1981	Taguatinga (1)	Guará
1982	Brasília (5)	Guará
1983	Brasília (6)	Guará
1984	Brasília (7)	Sobradinho
1985	Sobradinho (1)	Taguatinga
1986	Sobradinho (2)	Taguatinga
1987	Brasília (8)	Taguatinga
1988	Tiradentes (1)	Guará
1989	Taguatinga (2)	Sobradinho
1990	Gama (2)	Taguatinga
1991	Taguatinga (3)	Guará
1992	Taguatinga (4)	Tiradentes
1993	Taguatinga (5)	Gama
1994	Gama (3)	Sobradinho
1995	Gama (4)	Brasília
1996	Guará (1)	Gama
1997	Gama (5)	Brasília
1998	Gama (6)	Guará
1999	Gama (7)	Dom Pedro II
2000	Gama (8)	Bandeirante
2001	Gama (9)	Brasiliense
2002	CFZ (1)	Gama
2003	Gama (10)	Brasiliense
2004	Brasiliense (1)	Gama
2005	Brasiliense (2)	Ceilândia
2006	Brasiliense (3)	Gama
2007	Brasiliense (4)	Esportivo Guará
2008	Brasiliense (5)	Dom Pedro II
2009	Brasiliense (6)	Brasília
2010	Ceilândia (1)	Brasiliense
2011	Brasiliense (7)	Gama
2012	Ceilândia (2)	Luziânia
2013	Brasiliense (8)	Brasília
2014	Luziânia (1)	Brasília
2015	Gama (11)	Brasília
2016	Luziânia (2)	Ceilândia
2017	Brasiliense (9)	Ceilândia
2018	Sobradinho (3)	Brasiliense
2019	Gama (12)	Brasiliense
2020	Gama (13)	Brasiliense
2021	Brasiliense (10)	Ceilândia
2022	Brasiliense (11)	Ceilândia
2023	Real Brasília (1)	Brasiliense
2024	Ceilândia (3)	Capital
2025	Gama (14)	Capital
2026	Gama (15)	Sobradinho

Notes

- Dom Pedro II is the currently Real Brasília FC.
- CFZ Brasília is the currently Candango EC.

== Titles by team ==
Teams in bold stills active.

Rank	Club	Winners	Winning years
1	**Gama**	15	1979, 1990, 1994, 1995, 1997, 1998, 1999, 2000, 2001, 2003, 2015, 2019, 2020, 2025, 2026
2	**Brasiliense**	11	2004, 2005, 2006, 2007, 2008, 2009, 2011, 2013, 2017, 2021, 2022
3	**Brasília**	8	1976, 1977, 1978, 1980, 1982, 1983, 1984, 1987
4	**Taguatinga**	5	1981, 1989, 1991, 1992, 1993
5	Defelê	4	1960, 1961, 1962, 1968
5	Rabello	4	1964, 1965, 1966, 1967
7	**Ceilândia**	3	2010, 2012, 2024
7	**Sobradinho**	3	1985, 1986, 2018
9	Grêmio Brasiliense	2	1959, 1970
9	Guanabara	2	1964, 1966
9	**Luziânia**	2	2014, 2016
12	Campineira	1	1975
12	CEUB	1	1973
12	CFZ	1	2002
12	Coenge	1	1969
12	Colombo	1	1971
12	Cruzeiro do Sul	1	1963
12	Guará	1	1996
12	Pederneiras	1	1965
12	Pioneira	1	1974
12	**Real Brasília**	1	2023
12	Serviço Gráfico	1	1972
12	Tiradentes	1	1988

== See also ==
- Campeonato Brasiliense Second Division
- Campeonato Brasiliense Third Division
