= Brasília Futebol Clube =

Brazilian association football club based in Brasília, Federal District, Brazil

Brasília
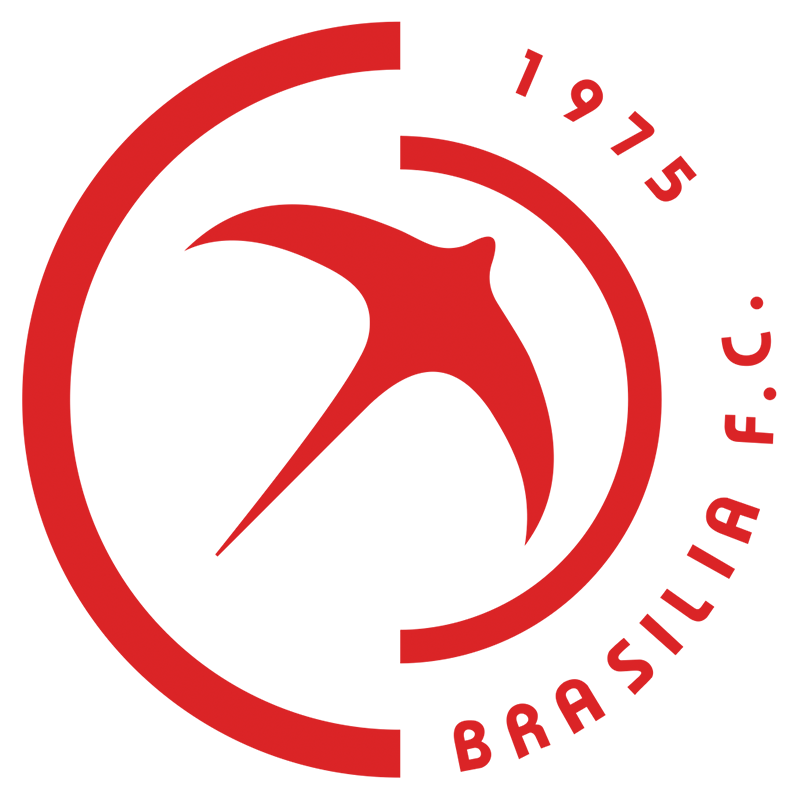
- Full name: Brasília Futebol Clube
- Nicknames: Avião do Cerrado (Cerrado's Airplane); Colorado do Cerrado (Red from Cerrado)
- Founded: 2 June 1975; 51 years ago
- Ground: Estádio Nacional Mané Garrincha
- Capacity: 69,349
- President: Flávio Simão
- Head coach: Luís dos Reis
- League: Campeonato Brasiliense
- 2025: Brasiliense Segunda Divisão, 2nd of 8 (promoted)
- Website: https://lopes2.mkveiculosdf.com.br/
Home colors	Away colors

Brasília Futebol Clube, commonly referred to as Brasília, is a Brazilian professional club based in Brasília, Distrito Federal founded on 2 June 1975. It competes in the Campeonato Brasiliense, the top flight of the Distrito Federal state football league.

== History ==
They were founded on June 2, 1975 as Brasília Esporte Clube by the entrepreneurs José da Silva Neto and Vicente de Paula Rodrigues. The club won the Campeonato Brasiliense eight times, the last time being in 1987. Brasília were Torneio Centro-Oeste's runner-up in 1984, after being defeated by Guará in the final. The club's football department was bought in 1999 by Brasília Promoções e Participações Desportivas S/A, which is a company owned by eight members (in Portuguese sócios) of the club, and the club was renamed to Brasília Futebol Clube, adopting a new logo, and changing its colors from red to yellow and blue. The club reverted to play in red in 2002. They competed in the Série A several times, the last time being in 2000 when the 116-team Copa João Havelange was played.

The year 2014 was marked in the history of Brasília by the title of the first edition of the Copa Verde. The club advanced the two initial stages of the competition by defeating CENE and Cuiabá, respectively. In the semifinals, he faced his rival Brasiliense. It was defeated by 2–0 in the first leg, however in the second leg, achieved a spectacular turnaround and won by 3–0. In the final, against Paysandu, defeat by 2–1 in the first leg. In the second game, more than 50,000 people watched Brasília win by the same score and take the decision for the penalties. In an exciting contest, the Avião do Cerrado won 7-6 and won the title.

With the title, the team secured a spot in the 2015 Copa Sudamericana. Brasília continued making history by eliminating the Goiás in the second stage, but was eliminated in the third stage by Atlético Paranaense.

== Stadium ==
Brasília play their home games at Estádio Nacional Mané Garrincha, one of the venues of both 2013 FIFA Confederations Cup and 2014 FIFA World Cup.

== Honours ==
=== Official tournaments ===
Regional
Competitions	Titles	Seasons
Copa Verde	1	2014
State
Competitions	Titles	Seasons
Campeonato Brasiliense	8	1976, 1977, 1978, 1980, 1982, 1983, 1984, 1987
Campeonato Brasiliense Second Division	2	2001, 2008

=== Runners-up ===
- Campeonato Brasiliense (7): 1979, 1995, 1997, 2009, 2013, 2014, 2015
- Campeonato Brasiliense Second Division (3): 2012, 2021, 2025
