= Brasiliense FC =

Brazilian association football club based in Taguatinga, Federal District

Brasiliense
- Full name: Brasiliense Futebol Clube
- Nicknames: Jacaré (Alligator); Jacarezão (Big Alligator); Esquadrão Amarelo (Yellow Squadron)
- Founded: 1 August 2000; 26 years ago
- Ground: Serejão
- Capacity: 27,000
- President: Luiz Estevão
- Head coach: Lúcio Flávio
- League: Campeonato Brasileiro Série D Campeonato Brasiliense
- 2025: Brasiliense, 4th of 10
- Website: brasiliensefc.com.br
Home colors	Away colors	Third colors

Brasiliense Futebol Clube, commonly referred to as Brasiliense, is a Brazilian professional club based in Taguatinga, Distrito Federal, founded on 1 August 2000. It competes in the Campeonato Brasileiro Série D, the fourth tier of Brazilian football, as well as in the Campeonato Brasiliense, the top flight of the Distrito Federal state football league.

== History ==
The club was founded on 1 August 2000 with the involvement of the CNPJ of Atlântida Esporte Clube by Luís Estêvão.

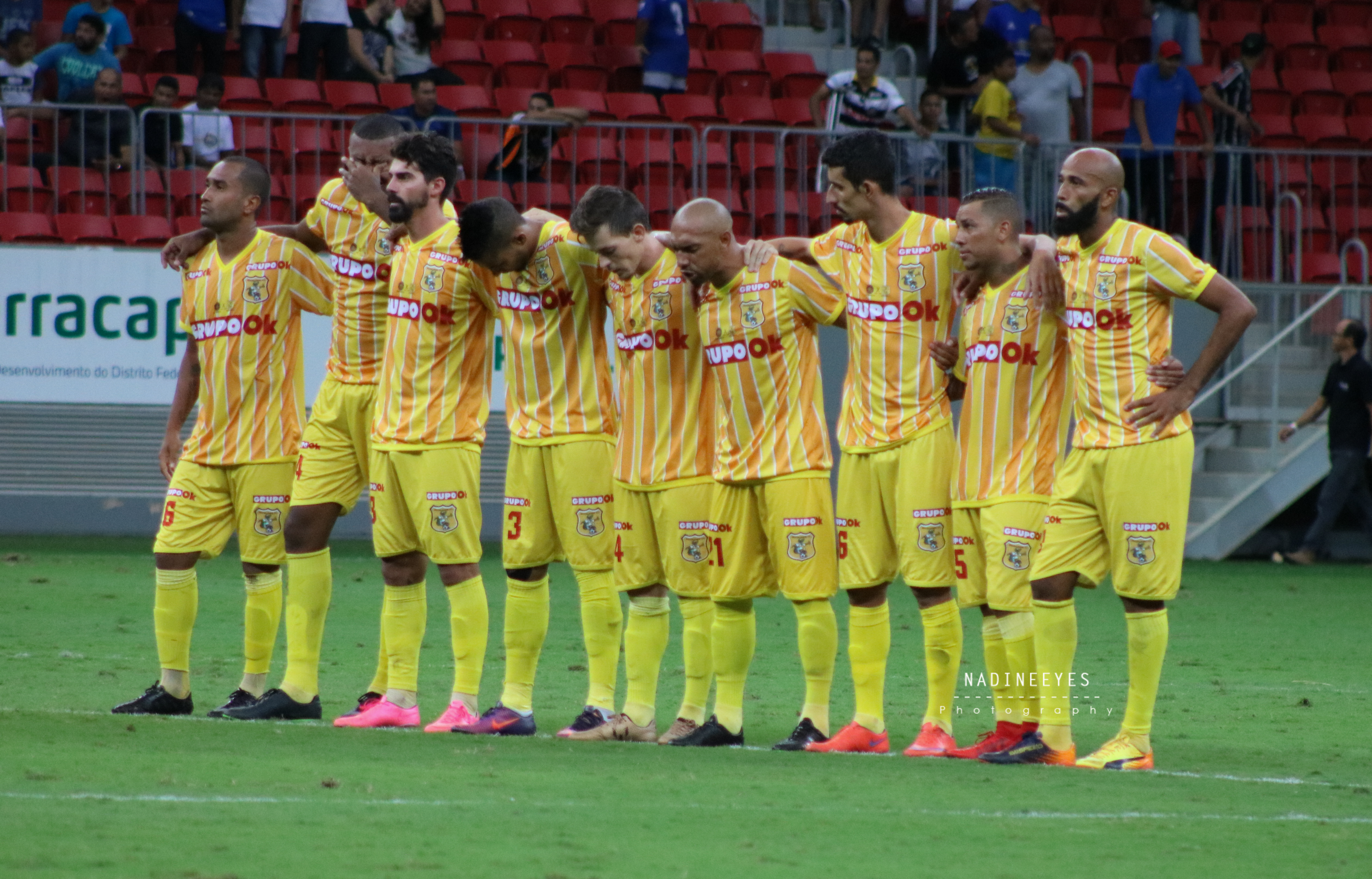
Brasiliense FC in 2018

Brasiliense managed to establish records in the Federal District and in Brazil during its short history. The club became the youngest finalist of a Copa do Brasil in its first participation, in 2002. It was the first and only team of the Federal District to dispute a national title in the elite of football. After eliminating traditional opponents like Náutico, Fluminense and Atlético Mineiro, they were runners-up in the final against Corinthians. Also in 2002, the club won its first national title, the Brazilian third division. Two years later, it achieved its greatest victory to date, by winning the Brazilian second division and achieving promotion to the Serie A. However, in the 2005 Campeonato Brasileiro Série A, Brasiliense finished last and were relegated to the Serie B in 2006. Also in 2005, the club made the Copa do Brasil semi-finals, losing to champions Fluminense.

== Symbols ==
The colors of Brasiliense Futebol Clube are green, yellow and white, in reference to the colors of the flag of the Federal District. The official mascot is the Alligator. The flag is composed of three bands in yellow and two in white with the official shield superimposed. The anthem was composed by Walter Queiroz and the first uniform always included shirts, shorts and yellow socks. In 2008 a cross was introduced in the uniform also in reference to the flag of the Federal District.

== Rivalries ==
Brasiliense's rivals are Gama and Brasília. Their biggest rival is Gama, another club from the Federal District that has achieved the great national achievements, such as also winning the Campeonato Brasileiro Série B. In addition, Gama and Brasiliense are the most popular clubs among the candangos (generic term used for the construction workers employed during the construction of Brasilia). The derby is called Verde-Amarelo (Green-Yellow), and usually attracts significant crowds.

== Stadium ==
Brasiliense's stadium is Elmo Serejo Farias (Serejão), which has a capacity of 27,000. The stadium is named after Elmo Serejo Farias, who was Taguatinga's administrator and Distrito Federal's governor during the stadium construction. They also play in Estádio Nacional Mané Garrincha.

== Honours ==
=== Official tournaments ===
National
Competitions	Titles	Seasons
Campeonato Brasileiro Série B	1	2004
Campeonato Brasileiro Série C	1	2002
Regional
Competitions	Titles	Seasons
Copa Verde	1	2020
State
Competitions	Titles	Seasons
Campeonato Brasiliense	11	2004, 2005, 2006, 2007, 2008, 2009, 2011, 2013, 2017, 2021, 2022
Campeonato Brasiliense Second Division	1	2000

=== Runners-up ===
- Copa do Brasil (1): 2002
- Campeonato Brasiliense (7): 2001, 2003, 2010, 2018, 2019, 2020, 2023
