= 2015 Campeonato Amapaense =

Campeonato Amapaense de Futebol
- Season: 2015
- Champions: Santos-AP
- Série D: Santos-AP
- Copa Verde: Santos-AP
- Copa do Brasil: Santos-AP
- Biggest home win: Santos-AP 7–1 Santana (2 September 2015); Santos-AP 6–0 Oratório (4 July 2015)
- Biggest away win: São Paulo-AP 3–5 Ypiranga (22 August 2015)
- Highest scoring: Santos-AP 7–1 Santana (2 September 2015)

The 2015 Campeonato Amapaense de Futebol was the 25th edition of Amapá's top professional football league. The competition began on 4 July and ended on 26 September.

== Format ==
9 teams play each other once each. The four best teams advance to the semifinals, and the two winners of the semifinals advanced to the Final where the title deciding match was played. The champions earned qualification to the 2016 Campeonato Brasileiro Série D, 2016 Copa Verde and 2016 Copa do Brasil.

== First phase ==
Pos	Team	Pld	W	D	L	GF	GA	GD	Pts	Qualification
1	Independente	8	6	1	1	13	6	+7	19	Qualifies to the Semifinals
2	Ypiranga	8	6	1	1	15	9	+6	19	Qualifies to the Semifinals
3	Trem	8	4	0	4	8	11	−3	12	Qualifies to the Semifinals
4	Santos-AP	8	3	2	3	18	8	+10	11	Qualifies to the Semifinals
5	Macapá	8	3	2	3	11	8	+3	11	
6	Oratório	8	3	2	3	10	10	0	11	
7	São José	8	2	2	4	8	13	−5	8	
8	São Paulo-AP	8	2	1	5	12	17	−5	7	
9	Santana	8	1	1	6	7	20	−13	4	

== Semifinals ==
Team 1	Agg.	Team 2	1st leg	2nd leg
Santos-AP	3–1	Independente	2–0	1–1
Trem	1–1 (4–2 p)	Ypiranga	0–1	1–0

== Finals ==
September 21, 2015
20:30 UTC−3

Santos-AP	0–1	Trem
	Report	Diego Ratinho 21'

Zerão, Macapá
Attendance: 1,545
Referee: Andrey Silva

September 26, 2015
18:30 UTC−3

Trem	0–1	Santos-AP
	Report	Fabinho 67'

Zerão, Macapá
Attendance: 2,434
Referee: Dewson Fernando Freitas da Silva
