= 2012 Campeonato Amapaense =

Campeonato Amapaense de Futebol
- Season: 2012
- Champions: Oratório
- Copa do Brasil: Oratório
- Série D: Oratório
- Matches: 21
- Goals: 61 (2.9 per match)

The 2012 Campeonato Amapaense de Futebol was the 67th season of Amapá's top professional football league. The competition began on April 22 and ended on a decision made by the Tribunal de Justiça Desportiva do Amapá. Oratório was crowned champion.

== Format ==
On the first stage, the eight teams play each other in a round-robin. The two best placed teams play the first stage final, and the six best teams advance to the second stage.

On the second stage, the six teams play each other in a round-robin again. The two best placed teams play the second stage final.

On the final stage, each stage winner faces each other. If the same team wins both stages, it is crowned champion.

== Participating teams ==
Club	Home city
Independente	Santana
Oratório	Macapá
Santana	Santana
Santos	Macapá
São José	Macapá
São Paulo	Macapá
Trem	Macapá
Ypiranga	Macapá

== First stage ==
=== Standings ===
Pos	Team	Pld	W	D	L	GF	GA	GD	Pts	Qualification
1	Ypiranga-AP (A)	14	6	6	2	36	16	+20	24	Advances to the First Stage finals and Second Stage
2	Oratório (A)	14	6	6	2	36	24	+12	24	Advances to the First Stage finals and Second Stage
3	Santos-AP (A)	14	4	6	4	7	8	−1	18	Advances to the Second Stage
4	Independente-AP (A)	14	4	6	4	8	9	−1	18	Advances to the Second Stage
5	São José-AP (A)	14	2	10	2	8	8	0	16	Advances to the Second Stage
6	Santana (A)	14	2	8	4	7	8	−1	14	Advances to the Second Stage
7	São Paulo-AP	14	2	8	4	5	8	−3	14	
8	Trem	14	0	10	4	10	12	−2	10	

Updated to match(es) played on 08 December 2012. Source: RSSSF Brasil
Rules for classification: 1) Points; 2) wins; 3) goal difference; 4) number of goals scored.
(A) Advance to a further round

=== Results ===
Home \ Away	IND	ORA	SAN	STO	SJO	SPO	TRE	YPI
Independente-AP		1–1	2–2	2–4	3–2	2–2	2–0	0–2
Oratório	2–2		0–1	2–0	2–2	1–0	3–3	2–0
Santana	1–1	2–0		4–4	1–2	1–1	1–1	0–2
Santos-AP	2–1	0–4	2–2		0–0	0–2	2–1	1–1
São José-AP	4–6	1–1	4–2	0–0		1–1	4–4	0–0
São Paulo	1–1	0–2	2–2	1–0	0–0		0–0	0–6
Trem	0–1	6–6	2–2	2–4	2–2	0–0		2–2
Ypiranga-AP	4–0	0–1	1–0	2–2	0–0	3–0	4–4	

Source: RSSSF Brasil
Legend: Blue = home team win; Yellow = draw; Red = away team win.

=== Final ===
Ypiranga	0–1	Oratório

Zerão, Macapá

== Second stage ==
=== Standings ===
Pos	Team	Pld	W	D	L	GF	GA	GD	Pts	Qualification
1	Oratório (A)	5	3	2	0	6	3	+3	11	Advances to the Second Stage finals
2	Santos-AP (A)	5	3	1	1	9	6	+3	10	Advances to the Second Stage finals
3	Ypiranga-AP	5	3	0	2	7	6	+1	9	
4	Santana	5	1	2	2	7	6	+1	5	
5	São José-AP	5	1	1	3	7	9	−2	4	
6	Independente-AP	5	0	2	3	7	13	−6	2	

Updated to match(es) played on 08 December 2012. Source: RSSSF Brasil
Rules for classification: 1) Points; 2) wins; 3) goal difference; 4) number of goals scored.
(A) Advance to a further round

=== Results ===
Home \ Away	IND	ORA	SAN	STO	SJO	YPI
Independente-AP		1–1	2–2	1–4		
Oratório			1–0	0–0	3–2	
Santana				1–2		
Santos-AP					2–1	1–3
São José-AP	3–2		1–1			0–1
Ypiranga-AP	3–1	0–1	0–3			

Source: RSSSF Brasil
Legend: Blue = home team win; Yellow = draw; Red = away team win.

=== Finals ===
Oratório	Not played	Santos

Zerão, Macapá
