= 2023 Campeonato Amapaense =

Campeonato Amapaense
- Season: 2023
- Champions: Trem
- Série D: Trem
- Copa do Brasil: Trem; Independente
- Copa Verde: Trem
- Matches: 34
- Goals: 131 (3.85 per match)
- Biggest home win: Ypiranga 5–1 Santana (2 June 2023)
- Biggest away win: São Paulo 0–8 Ypiranga (22 June 2023)
- Highest scoring: Santana 2–8 São Paulo (16 June 2023)

The 2023 Campeonato Amapaense was the 78th edition of Amapá's top professional football league. The competition started on 10 May and ended on 3 August. Trem won the championship for the 8th time.

== Format ==
In the first stage, the clubs will play each other in a single round, and in direct confrontation, with the four best-placed teams qualifying for the final stage. The semi-finals will be played in a two-leg knockout system, between the four best teams in the first stage. The two best teams from the first stage will play the semifinal round with the advantage of a draw.

The champion qualify to the 2024 Campeonato Brasileiro Série D, 2024 Copa do Brasil and 2024 Copa Verde. The runner-up qualify only to the 2024 Copa do Brasil.

== Participating teams ==
Locations of the 2023 Campeonato Amapaense teams

Club	Home City	2022 Result
Independente Esporte Clube	Santana	2nd
Esporte Clube Macapá	Macapá	7th
Oratório Recreativo Clube	Macapá	5th
Santana Esporte Clube	Santana	4th
Santos Futebol Clube	Macapá	3rd
São Paulo Futebol Clube	Macapá	8th
Trem Desportivo Clube	Macapá	1st
Ypiranga Clube	Macapá	6th

== First stage ==
Pos	Team	Pld	W	D	L	GF	GA	GD	Pts	Qualification or relegation
1	Independente (A)	7	6	0	1	20	9	+11	18	Advance to the Final stage
2	Trem (A)	7	5	0	2	18	7	+11	15	Advance to the Final stage
3	Ypiranga (A)	7	4	2	1	21	9	+12	14	Advance to the Final stage
4	Oratório (A)	7	3	2	2	12	8	+4	11	Advance to the Final stage
5	Santos	7	2	2	3	13	8	+5	8	
6	Macapá	7	2	2	3	10	13	−3	8	
7	São Paulo	7	1	1	5	11	27	−16	4	
8	Santana	7	0	1	6	8	32	−24	1	

Source: Globo Esporte
(A) Advance to a further round

== Final stage ==
=== Semi-finals ===
Team 1	Agg.	Team 2	1st leg	2nd leg
Oratório	2–2	Independente	0–0	2–2
Ypiranga	1–5	Trem	0–2	1–3

=== Finals ===
Team 1	Agg.	Team 2	1st leg	2nd leg
Trem	5–3	Independente	2–0	3–3
