= 2013 Campeonato Amapaense =

Campeonato Amapaense de Futebol
- Season: 2013
- Champions: Santos-AP
- Copa do Brasil: Santos-AP
- Série D: Santos-AP
- Matches: 28

The 2013 Campeonato Amapaense de Futebol is the 68th edition of the Amapá's top professional football league. The competition began on July, and ended on October 12.

== Format ==
On the first stage all teams play against each other once. The two best teams play against each other to find the round's winner, and the six best advance to the second stage.

On the second stage, all six teams from the first stage play against each other once. The two best teams play against each other to find the second round's winner.

On the final stage, the winner of the first stage play against the winner of the second stage.

=== Qualifications ===
The champion qualifies to the 2014 Copa do Brasil and the 2014 Campeonato Brasileiro Série D.

== Participating teams ==
Club	Home city
Independente	Santana
Macapá	Macapá
Santana	Santana
Santos-AP	Macapá
São José-AP	Macapá
São Paulo-AP	Macapá
Trem	Macapá
Ypiranga	Macapá

== First stage ==
=== Standings ===
Pos	Team	Pld	W	D	L	GF	GA	GD	Pts	Qualification
1	Santos-AP	7	4	2	1	13	6	+7	14	Advances to first round's finals and to the next stage
2	Trem	7	4	1	2	15	11	+4	13	Advances to first round's finals and to the next stage
3	Ypiranga	7	3	4	0	9	5	+4	13	Advances to the next stage
4	São Paulo-AP	7	2	3	2	13	10	+3	9	Advances to the next stage
5	Macapá	7	2	3	2	8	8	0	9	Advances to the next stage
6	Independente-AP	7	2	1	4	8	14	−6	7	Advances to the next stage
7	São José-AP	7	1	3	3	6	5	+1	6	
8	Santana	7	0	3	4	5	18	−13	3	

Rules for classification: 1) points; 2) goal difference; 3) number of goals scored.

=== Results ===
Home \ Away	IND	MAC	SAN	STO	SJO	SPO	TRE	YPI
Independente-AP		3–1	2–0			2–2	1–2	
Macapá				1–2			3–1	1–1
Santana		1–1			1–1	1–5		
Santos-AP	3–0		3–0		0–0		2–1	
São José-AP	4–0	0–1					0–1	1–2
São Paulo-AP		0–0		3–2	0–0			1–2
Trem			6–2			3–2		1–1
Ypiranga	2–0		0–0	1–1				

Legend: Blue = home team win; Yellow = draw; Red = away team win.

=== Finals ===
September 9, 2013

Santos-AP	1–1	Trem

Estádio Municipal Glicério Marques, Macapá

== Second stage ==
=== Standings ===
Pos	Team	Pld	W	D	L	GF	GA	GD	Pts	Qualification
1	Macapá	5	4	0	1	11	6	+5	12	Advances to second round's finals
2	Independente-AP	5	3	1	1	8	6	+2	10	Advances to second round's finals
3	Trem	5	3	0	2	3	2	+1	9	
4	Ypiranga	5	2	0	3	5	7	−2	6	
5	Santos-AP	5	1	1	3	4	6	−2	4	
6	São Paulo-AP	5	1	0	4	6	10	−4	3	

Updated to match(es) played on September 09, 2013. Source:
Rules for classification: 1) points; 2) goal difference; 3) number of goals scored.

=== Results ===
Home \ Away	IND	MAC	STO	SPO	TRE	YPI
Independente-AP		1–2			1–0	3–2
Macapá				3–4	1–0	3–0
Santos-AP	1–1	1–2		2–1		0–1
São Paulo-AP	1–2					0–2
Trem			1–0	1–0		1–0
Ypiranga						

Legend: Blue = home team win; Yellow = draw; Red = away team win.

=== Finals ===
October 7, 2013
21:30

Macapá	1-1	Independente-AP

Estádio Municipal Glicério Marques, Macapá

== Championship final ==
October 10, 2013
20:30

Santos-AP	2 - 0	Macapá

Estádio Municipal Glicério Marques, Macapá

October 12, 2013
20:30

Macapá	2 - 2	Santos-AP

Estádio Municipal Glicério Marques, Macapá
