= Rafinha (footballer, born 1989) =

Brazilian footballer

Personal information
- Full name: Rafael Junior dos Santos Freire
- Date of birth: 26 December 1989 (age 36)
- Place of birth: Ourém, Brazil
- Position: Midfielder

Senior career*
Years	Team	Apps	(Gls)
2013	Macapá		
2014	São Paulo–AP		
2015	Independente–AP		
2016	Santos–AP	9	(1)
2016	Tuna Luso	16	(4)
2017–2018	Bragantino-PA	5	(4)
2018	→ Manaus (loan)	1	(0)
2018	Brasiliense		
2018	Paraense-PA		
2019	Bragantino-PA	20	(4)
2019	Izabelense		
2020	Bragantino-PA	1	(0)
2020	Santos-AP	5	(1)
2021	Gavião Kyikatejê	1	(0)
2021	Bragantino-PA	3	(0)
2021	Trem	10	(1)
2021	Capitão Poço	6	(1)
2021	Caeté	2	(0)
2022	Trem		
- * Club domestic league appearances and goals

Rafael Junior dos Santos Freire (born 26 December 1989, in Ourém), commonly known as Rafinha, is a Brazilian former professional footballer who plays as midfielder. He played for national competitions such as Copa do Brasil and Campeonato Brasileiro Série D for Santos–AP.

== Career statistics ==
As of 19 January 2017

Club	Season	League			State League		Cup		Conmebol		Other		Total	
Club	Season	Division	Apps	Goals	Apps	Goals	Apps	Goals	Apps	Goals	Apps	Goals	Apps	Goals
Independente–AP	2015	Amapaense	—		11	4	—		—		—		11	4
Santos–AP	2016	Série D	4	0	8	1	2	1	—		1	0	15	2
Tuna Luso	2016	Paraense B	—		2	0	—		—		—		2	0
Career total			4	0	21	5	2	1	0	0	1	0	28	6
