= 2014 Campeonato Amapaense =

Campeonato Amapaense de Futebol
- Season: 2014
- Champions: Santos-AP
- Copa do Brasil: Santos-AP
- Série D: Santos-AP
- Copa Verde: Santos-AP
- Matches played: 11
- Goals scored: 22 (2 per match)

The 2014 Campeonato Amapaense de Futebol was the 69th edition of the Amapá's top professional football league. The competition began on March, and ended on May 17. Santos-AP won the championship for the third time.

== Format ==
The four teams will play two rounds. On each round, the two best teams from the round will play in the round finals. The winner from first round will face the second round winner in the championship final.

== Participating teams ==
Club	Home city
Macapá	Macapá
Santana	Santana
Santos-AP	Macapá
São Paulo-AP	Macapá

== First round ==
Pos	Team	Pld	W	D	L	GF	GA	GD	Pts	Qualification
1	Santos-AP	3	2	1	0	5	1	+4	7	Advances to first round's finals
2	Macapá	3	1	1	1	1	3	−2	4	Advances to first round's finals
3	São Paulo-AP	3	1	0	2	2	3	−1	3	
4	Santana	3	0	2	1	2	3	−1	2	

Updated to match(es) played on September 09, 2013. Source:
Rules for classification: 1) points; 2) goal difference; 3) number of goals scored.

=== Results ===
Home \ Away	MAC	SAN	STO	SPO
Macapá			0–3	
Santana	0–0		1–1	
Santos-AP				1–0
São Paulo-AP	0–1	2–1		

Legend: Blue = home team win; Yellow = draw; Red = away team win.

=== Final ===
April 26, 2014
18:00

Santos-AP	3–1	Macapá
Everton 1'; Hector Vasquez 30'; Fabinho 80'		Fabrício Sá 85'

Estádio Municipal Glicério Marques, Macapá
Attendance: 789

== Second round ==
Pos	Team	Pld	W	D	L	GF	GA	GD	Pts	Qualification
1	Santos-AP	3	3	0	0	4	1	+3	9	Advances to second round's finals
2	São Paulo-AP	3	2	0	1	5	4	+1	6	Advances to second round's finals
3	Macapá	3	1	0	2	3	3	0	3	
4	Santana	3	0	0	3	1	5	−4	0	

Updated to match(es) played on September 09, 2013. Source:
Rules for classification: 1) points; 2) goal difference; 3) number of goals scored.

=== Results ===
Home \ Away	MAC	SAN	STO	SPO
Macapá		2–0		1–2
Santana				1–2
Santos-AP	1–0	1–0		
São Paulo-AP			1–2	

Legend: Blue = home team win; Yellow = draw; Red = away team win.

=== Final ===
May 17, 2014
17:00

Santos-AP	2–0	São Paulo-AP
Hector Vasquez 23'; Maicon Gaúcho 81'

Estádio Municipal Glicério Marques, Macapá
Attendance: 369
Referee: Valdicleuson Costa
