= Campeonato Amapaense de Futebol Feminino =

Women's football league in Amapá, Brazil

- Founded: 2006
- Country: Brazil
- Confederation: FAF
- Promotion to: Brasileiro Série A3
- Current champions: Portuguesa (1st title) (2025)
- Most championships: Oratório (8 titles)
- Current: 2026

The Campeonato Amapaense de Futebol Feminino is the women's football state championship of Amapá state, and is contested since 2006.

== List of champions ==
Following is the list with all recognized titles of Campeonato Amapaense Feminino:

Season	Champions	Runners-up
2006	Boné Azul (1)	Radar
2007	Rio Norte (1)	Tartarugalzinho
2008	Rio Norte (2)	Santos
2009	Oratório (1)	Trem
2010	Oratório (2)	Trem
2011	Oratório (3)	São Paulo
2012	ADEC (1)	Santana
2013–2014	Not held	
2015	Oratório (4)	Rio Norte
2016	Oratório (5)	Porto Grande
2017	Santana (1)	Oratório
2018	Oratório (6)	Rio Norte
2019	Oratório (7)	Macapá
2020	Oratório (8)	Macapá
2021	Ypiranga (1)	Oratório
2022	Not held	
2023	Ypiranga (2)	Macapá
2024	Ypiranga (3)	Trem
2025	Portuguesa (1)	Ypiranga

== Titles by team ==
Teams in bold stills active.

Rank	Club	Winners	Winning years
1	**Oratório**	8	2009, 2010, 2011, 2015, 2016, 2018, 2019 2020
2	**Ypiranga**	3	2021, 2023, 2024
3	Rio Norte	2	2007, 2008
4	**ADEC**	1	2012
4	Boné Azul	1	2006
4	**Santana**	1	2017
4	**Portuguesa**	1	2025

=== By city ===
City	Championships	Clubs
Macapá	15	Oratório (8),Ypiranga (3), Rio Norte (2), Boné Azul (1), Portuguesa (1)
Calçoene	1	ADEC (1)
Santana	1	Santana (1)
