= 1998 in Brazilian football =

Football in Brazil
- Season: 1998

The following article presents a summary of the 1998 football (soccer) season in Brazil, which was the 97th season of competitive football in the country.

== Campeonato Brasileiro Série A ==
Quarterfinals

Team #1	Agg	Team #2	1st leg	2nd leg	3rd leg
Cruzeiro	6-5	Palmeiras	2-1	1-2	3-2
Grêmio	2-2	Corinthians	0-1	2-0	0-1
Portuguesa	5-3	Coritiba	3-1	0-0	2-2
Sport	4-6	Santos	3-1	1-2	0-3

Semifinals

Team #1	Agg	Team #2	1st leg	2nd leg	3rd leg
Cruzeiro	5-3	Portuguesa	3-1	1-2	1-0
Santos	3-4	Corinthians	2-1	0-2	1-1

Final

December 13, 1998

Cruzeiro	2–2	Corinthians

Mineirão

December 20, 1998

Corinthians	1–1	Cruzeiro

Morumbi

December 23, 1998

Corinthians	2–0	Cruzeiro

Morumbi

Corinthians declared as the Campeonato Brasileiro champions by aggregate score of 5-3.

=== Relegation ===
The four worst placed teams, which are América-MG, Goiás, Bragantino and América-RN, were relegated to the following year's second level.

== Campeonato Brasileiro Série B ==
Pos	Team	Pld	W	D	L	GF	GA	GD	Pts	Promotion	GAM	BSP	DES	LON
1	Gama	6	2	4	0	10	6	+4	10	Promoted to Série A 1999		1–1	2–2	3–0
2	Botafogo-SP	6	2	3	1	9	5	+4	9	Promoted to Série A 1999	1–2		5–1	1–0
3	Desportiva	6	1	3	2	8	12	−4	6		2–2	1–1		1–0
4	Londrina	6	1	2	3	2	6	−4	5		0–0	0–0	2–1	

Gama declared as the Campeonato Brasileiro Série B champions.

=== Promotion ===
The two best placed teams in the final stage of the competition, which are Gama and Botafogo-SP, were promoted to the following year's first level.

=== Relegation ===
The six worst teams among the two worst placed teams in each one of the four groups in the first stage, which were Atlético Goianiense, Náutico, Volta Redonda, Americano, Fluminense and Juventus, were relegated to the following year's third level.

== Campeonato Brasileiro Série C ==
Pos	Team	Pld	W	D	L	GF	GA	GD	Pts	AVA	SCA	ANA	ITB
1	Avaí (P)	6	2	3	1	8	7	+1	9		2–1	0–0	1–1
2	São Caetano (P)	6	2	2	2	4	5	−1	8	1–0		0–0	0–0
3	Anapolina	6	1	4	1	8	5	+3	7	3–3	1–2		5–0
4	Itabaiana	6	1	3	2	5	8	−3	6	1–2	3–0	0–0	

Source: rsssf.com
(P) Promoted to Série B 1999

Avaí declared as the Campeonato Brasileiro Série C champions.

=== Promotion ===
The two best placed teams in the final stage of the competition, which are Avaí and São Caetano, were promoted to the following year's second level.

== Copa do Brasil ==
The Copa do Brasil final was played between Palmeiras and Cruzeiro.

May 26, 1998

Cruzeiro	1–0	Palmeiras

Mineirão

May 30, 1998

Palmeiras	2–0	Cruzeiro

Morumbi

Palmeiras declared as the cup champions on better goal difference by aggregate score of 2-1.

== Regional and state championship champions ==
Regional championship champions

Competition	Champion
Campeonato do Nordeste	América-RN
Copa Norte	Sampaio Corrêa
Torneio Rio-São Paulo	Botafogo

State championship champions

State	Champion	State	Champion
Acre	Independência	Paraíba	Botafogo-PB
Alagoas	CSA	Paraná	Atlético Paranaense
Amapá	Aliança	Pernambuco	Sport Recife
Amazonas	São Raimundo	Piauí	Picos
Bahia	Bahia	Rio de Janeiro	Vasco
Ceará	Ceará	Rio Grande do Norte	ABC
Distrito Federal	Gama	Rio Grande do Sul	Juventude
Espírito Santo	Linhares EC	Rondônia	Ji-Paraná
Goiás	Goiás	Roraima	Atlético Roraima
Maranhão	Sampaio Corrêa	Santa Catarina	Criciúma
Mato Grosso	Sinop	São Paulo	São Paulo
Mato Grosso do Sul	Ubiratan	Sergipe	Lagartense
Minas Gerais	Cruzeiro	Tocantins	Alvorada
Pará	Paysandu		

== Youth competition champions ==
Competition	Champion
Copa Macaé de Juvenis	Vasco
Copa Santiago de Futebol Juvenil	Grêmio
Copa São Paulo de Juniores	Internacional
Taça Belo Horizonte de Juniores	Palmeiras

== Other competition champions ==
Competition	Champion
Copa Paraná	Atlético Paranaense
Copa Pernambuco	Sport
Copa Rio	Fluminense
Copa Santa Catarina	Tubarão
Torneio Maria Quitéria	Bahia

== Brazilian clubs in international competitions ==
Team	Copa Libertadores 1998	Copa Mercosur 1998	Copa CONMEBOL 1998	Copa Interamericana 1998	Recopa Sudamericana 1998	Intercontinental Cup 1998
América-RN	Did not qualify	Did not qualify	Round of 16	N/A	N/A	N/A
Atlético Mineiro	Did not qualify	Did not qualify	Semifinals	N/A	N/A	N/A
Corinthians	Did not qualify	Group stage	Did not qualify	N/A	N/A	N/A
Cruzeiro	Round of 16	Runner-up	Did not qualify	N/A	Champions	N/A
Flamengo	Did not qualify	Group stage	Did not qualify	N/A	N/A	N/A
Grêmio	Quarterfinals	Group stage	Did not qualify	N/A	N/A	N/A
Palmeiras	Did not qualify	Champions	Did not qualify	N/A	N/A	N/A
Sampaio Corrêa	Did not qualify	Did not qualify	Semifinals	N/A	N/A	N/A
Santos	Did not qualify	Did not qualify	Champions	N/A	N/A	N/A
São Paulo	Did not qualify	Group stage	Did not qualify	N/A	N/A	N/A
Vasco	Champions	Group stage	Did not qualify	Runner-up	N/A	Runner-up

== Brazil national team ==
The following table lists all the games played by the Brazil national football team in official competitions and friendly matches during 1998.

Date	Opposition	Result	Score	Brazil scorers	Competition
February 3, 1998	Jamaica	D	0-0	-	Gold Cup
February 5, 1998	Guatemala	D	1-1	Romário	Gold Cup
February 8, 1998	El Salvador	W	4-0	Edmundo, Romário, Élber (2)	Gold Cup
February 10, 1998	United States	L	0-1	-	Gold Cup
February 15, 1998	Jamaica	W	1-0	Romário	Gold Cup
March 25, 1998	Germany	W	2-1	César Sampaio, Ronaldo	International Friendly
April 29, 1998	Argentina	L	0-1	-	International Friendly
May 31, 1998	(Spain) Athletic Bilbao	D	1-1	Rivaldo	Friendly (unofficial match)
June 3, 1998	Andorra	W	3-0	Giovanni, Rivaldo, Cafu	International Friendly
June 10, 1998	Scotland	W	2-1	César Sampaio, Tom Boyd (own goal)	World Cup
June 16, 1998	Morocco	W	3-0	Ronaldo, Rivaldo, Bebeto	World Cup
June 23, 1998	Norway	L	1-2	Bebeto	World Cup
June 27, 1998	Chile	W	4-1	César Sampaio (2), Ronaldo (2)	World Cup
July 3, 1998	Denmark	W	3-2	Bebeto, Rivaldo (2)	World Cup
July 7, 1998	Netherlands	D	1-1 (4-2 pen)	Ronaldo	World Cup
July 12, 1998	France	L	0-3	-	World Cup
September 23, 1998	FR Yugoslavia	D	1-1	Marcelinho Carioca	International Friendly
October 14, 1998	Ecuador	W	5-1	Marcelinho Carioca, Élber (3), Cafu	International Friendly
October 18, 1998	Russia	W	5-1	Élber, Amoroso (2), Rivaldo, Marcos Assunção	International Friendly

== Women's football ==
=== Brazil women's national football team ===
The following table lists all the games played by the Brazil women's national football team in official competitions and friendly matches during 1998.

Date	Opposition	Result	Score	Brazil scorers	Competition
March 2, 1998	Peru	W	15–0	unavailable	Sudamericano Femenino
March 5, 1998	Colombia	W	12–1	unavailable	Sudamericano Femenino
March 6, 1998	Venezuela	W	14–0	unavailable	Sudamericano Femenino
March 10, 1998	Chile	W	7–0	unavailable	Sudamericano Femenino
March 13, 1998	Ecuador	W	11–1	unavailable	Sudamericano Femenino
March 15, 1998	Argentina	W	7–1	unavailable	Sudamericano Femenino
September 15, 1998	Russia	D	2–2	Pretinha (2)	U.S. Cup
September 18, 1998	Mexico	W	11–0	Roseli (6), Pretinha (4), Nenê	U.S. Cup
September 20, 1998	United States	L	0–3		U.S. Cup

The Brazil women's national football team competed in the following competitions in 1998:

Competition	Performance
Sudamericano Femenino	Champions
U.S. Cup	Runner-up

=== Domestic competition champions ===
Competition	Champion
Campeonato Brasileiro	Portuguesa
Campeonato Carioca	Vasco
Campeonato Paulista	Lusa Sant'Anna
