= Fabinho (footballer, born 1992) =

Brazilian footballer

Personal information
- Full name: Fabio da Silva Santos
- Date of birth: 15 May 1992 (age 34)
- Place of birth: Macapá, Brazil
- Position: Forward

Team information
- Current team: Santos–AP

Senior career*
| Years | Team | Apps | (Gls) |
| 2012–2013 | Oratório | | |
| 2014 | Santos–AP | 10 | (1) |
| 2015 | Londrina | | |
| 2015– | Santos–AP | 7 | (0) |
- * Club domestic league appearances and goals as of 23 January 2017

Fabio da Silva Santos (born May 15, 1992 in Macapá), commonly known as Fabinho, is a Brazilian footballer who plays for Santos–AP as forward. He already played for national competitions such as Copa do Brasil and Campeonato Brasileiro Série D.

== Career statistics ==
As of 23 January 2017

| Club | Season | League | | | State League | | Cup | | Conmebol | | Other | | Total | |
| Club | Season | Division | Apps | Goals | Apps | Goals | Apps | Goals | Apps | Goals | Apps | Goals | Apps | Goals |
|---|---|---|---|---|---|---|---|---|---|---|---|---|---|---|
| Oratório | 2013 | Amapaense | — | | — | | 1 | 0 | — | | — | | 1 | 0 |
| Santos–AP | 2014 | Série D | 10 | 1 | — | | 1 | 0 | — | | 2 | 0 | 13 | 1 |
| Londrina | 2015 | Série C | — | | 0 | 0 | 0 | 0 | — | | — | | 0 | 0 |
| Santos–AP | 2015 | Série D | 4 | 0 | 10 | 4 | — | | — | | — | | 14 | 4 |
| Santos–AP | 2016 | Série D | 3 | 0 | 9 | 2 | 2 | 0 | — | | 2 | 0 | 16 | 2 |
| Santos–AP | Subtotal | | 7 | 0 | 19 | 6 | 2 | 0 | 0 | 0 | 2 | 0 | 30 | 6 |
| Career total | | | 17 | 1 | 19 | 6 | 4 | 0 | 0 | 0 | 4 | 0 | 44 | 7 |
