= Clube Atlético Cristal =

Football club in Macapá, Brazil

Cristal
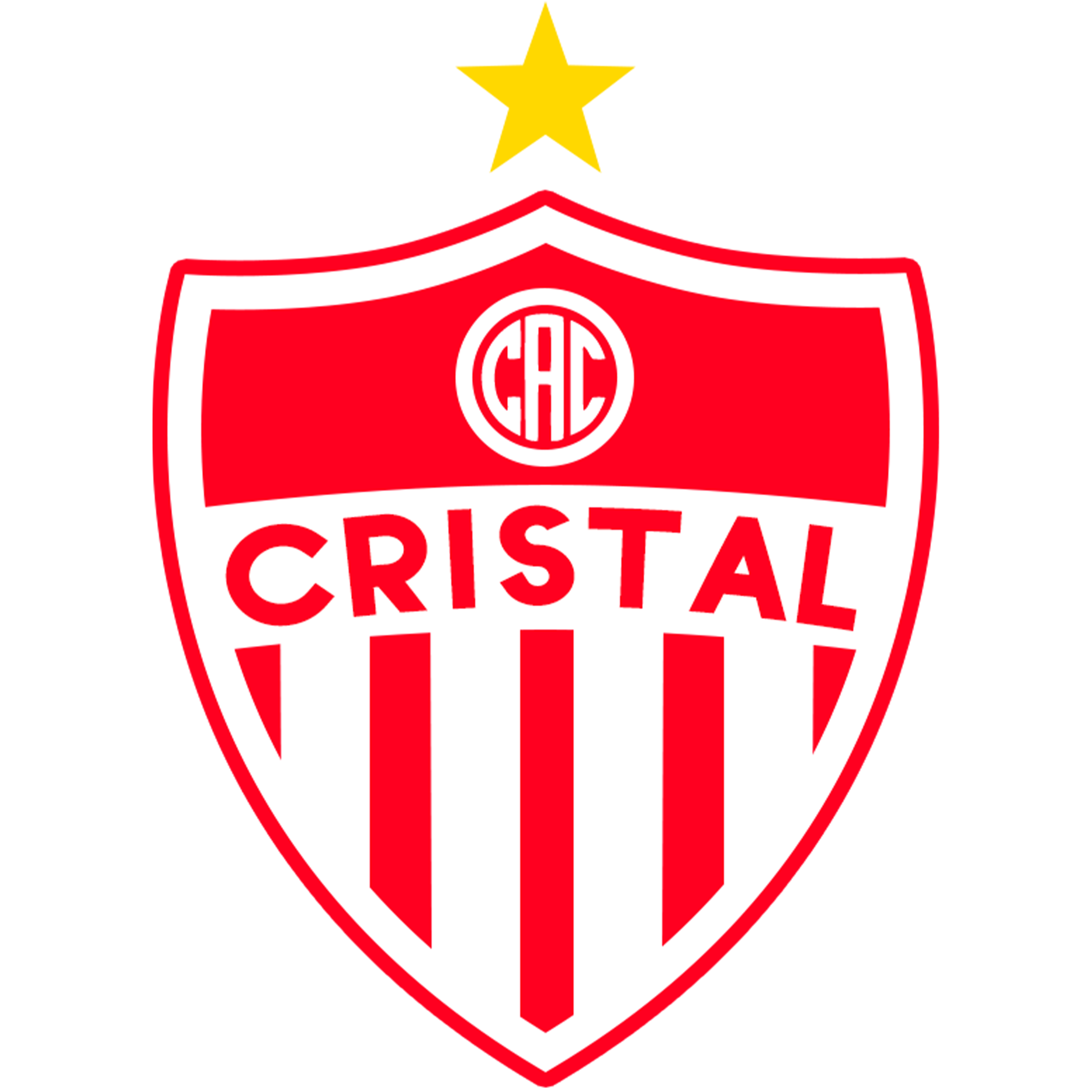
- Full name: Clube Atlético Cristal
- Nickname(s): Dragão (Dragon)
- Founded: 15 November 1969; 55 years ago
- Ground: Glicério Marques
- Capacity: 5,630
- Chairman: Edson Cardoso Monteiro
- 2011: Amapazão, 9th of 10
| Home colours | Away colours |

Clube Atlético Cristal, commonly referred to as Cristal (Brazilian Portuguese: [kɾisˈtaw]), is a Brazilian football club based in based in Macapá, Amapá. The club's senior team is inactive since 2013, having last played in a professional match in August 2011.

They competed in the Série C in 2008, and in the Série D in 2009.

== History ==
Clube Atlético Cristal was founded on 15 November 1969 by Aldemir da Silva Figueira from the Santa Rita neighborhood in Macapá, aiming to rival local club Oratório Recreativo Clube. Soon after, the club became affiliated to the Federação Amapaense de Desportos and began competing in their tournaments. Cristal didn't have much success in the second tier of the state league, winning their first promotion in 1988, beating Lagoa Esporte Clube 5-0 in the final.

They won the Campeonato Amapaense Second Level in 1988 and in 2005, and the Campeonato Amapaense in 2008, when they beat São José in the final. Cristal competed in the Série C in 2008, when they were eliminated in the first stage of the competition, and in the Série D in 2009.

== Honours ==
- Campeonato Amapaense
  - Winners (1): 2008
  - Runners-up (3): 1990, 1995, 2007
- Campeonato Amapaense Second Division
  - Winners (2): 1988, 2005
