= 1997 in Brazilian football =

Football in Brazil
- Season: 1997

The following article presents a summary of the 1997 football (soccer) season in Brazil, which was the 96th season of competitive football in the country.

== Campeonato Brasileiro Série A ==
Second phase

Group A
Pos	Team	Pld	W	D	L	GF	GA	GD	Pts	Qualification
1	Vasco da Gama	6	4	2	0	14	5	+9	14	Qualified for the final
2	Flamengo	6	2	2	2	7	8	−1	8	
3	Juventude	6	2	1	3	6	11	−5	7	
4	Portuguesa	6	1	1	4	5	8	−3	4	

Group B
Pos	Team	Pld	W	D	L	GF	GA	GD	Pts	Qualification
1	Palmeiras	6	5	1	0	10	4	+6	16	Qualified for the final
2	Santos	6	2	1	3	9	10	−1	7	
3	Internacional	6	2	0	4	8	10	−2	6	
4	Atlético Mineiro	6	2	0	4	6	9	−3	6	

Final

December 14, 1997

Palmeiras	0–0	Vasco da Gama

Morumbi

December 21, 1997

Vasco da Gama	0–0	Palmeiras

Maracanã

Vasco da Gama were declared as the Campeonato Brasileiro champions because the club had scored more points than Palmeiras throughout the year.

=== Relegation ===
The four worst placed teams, which are Bahia, Criciúma, Fluminense and União São João, were relegated to the following year's second level.

== Campeonato Brasileiro Série B ==
Pos	Team	Pld	W	D	L	GF	GA	GD	Pts	Promotion	AMG	PON	NAU	VIL
1	América-MG	6	4	1	1	7	1	+6	13	Promoted to Série A 1998		0–0	2–0	1–0
2	Ponte Preta	6	3	2	1	6	6	0	11	Promoted to Série A 1998	1–0		1–1	1–0
3	Náutico	6	2	2	2	9	6	+3	8		0–2	3–0		4–0
4	Vila Nova	6	0	1	5	3	12	−9	1		0–2	2–3	1–1	

América Mineiro declared as the Campeonato Brasileiro Série B champions.

=== Promotion ===
The two best placed teams in the final stage of the competition, which are América-MG and Ponte Preta, were promoted to the following year's first level.

=== Relegation ===
The worst placed team in each one of the five groups in the first stage, which are Moto Club, Central, Sergipe, Giatuba and Mogi Mirim, were relegated to the following year's third level.

== Campeonato Brasileiro Série C ==
Pos	Team	Pld	W	D	L	GF	GA	GD	Pts	SMC	JUV	FRA	TUP
1	Sampaio Corrêa (P)	6	3	3	0	11	5	+6	12		1–1	3–1	3–0
2	Juventus (P)	6	2	2	2	9	8	+1	8	2–2		2–1	3–1
3	Francana	6	2	1	3	6	8	−2	7	1–1	1–0		1–2
4	Tupi	6	2	0	4	5	10	−5	6	0–1	2–1	0–1	

Source: rsssf.com
(P) Promoted to 1998 Série B

Sampaio Corrêa declared as the Campeonato Brasileiro Série C champions.

=== Promotion ===
The two best placed teams in the final stage of the competition, which are Sampaio Corrêa and Juventus, were promoted to the following year's second level.

== Copa do Brasil ==
The Copa do Brasil final was played between Grêmio and Flamengo.

May 20, 1997

Grêmio	0–0	Flamengo

Olímpico

May 22, 1997

Flamengo	2–2	Grêmio

Maracanã

Grêmio declared as the cup champions on the away goal rule by aggregate score of 2-2.

== Regional and state championship champions ==
Regional championship champions

Competition	Champion
Campeonato do Nordeste	Vitória
Copa Centro-Oeste	Rio Branco
Torneio Rio-São Paulo	Santos

State championship champions

State	Champion	State	Champion
Acre	Rio Branco	Paraíba	Confiança-PB
Alagoas	CSA	Paraná	Paraná
Amapá	Ypiranga	Pernambuco	Sport Recife
Amazonas	São Raimundo	Piauí	Picos
Bahia	Vitória	Rio de Janeiro	Botafogo
Ceará	Ceará	Rio Grande do Norte	ABC
Distrito Federal	Gama	Rio Grande do Sul	Internacional
Espírito Santo	Linhares EC	Rondônia	Ji-Paraná
Goiás	Goiás	Roraima	Baré
Maranhão	Sampaio Corrêa	Santa Catarina	Avaí
Mato Grosso	Operário (VG)	São Paulo	Corinthians
Mato Grosso do Sul	Operário	Sergipe	Itabaiana
Minas Gerais	Cruzeiro	Tocantins	Gurupi
Pará	Remo		

== Other competition champions ==
Competition	Champion
Copa dos Campeões Mundiais	Flamengo
Copa Pernambuco	Recife
Festival Brasileiro de Futebol	Coritiba
Torneio Maria Quitéria	Palmeiras

== Brazilian clubs in international competitions ==
Team	Copa Libertadores 1997	Supercopa Sudamericana 1997	Copa CONMEBOL 1997	Intercontinental Cup 1997
Atlético Mineiro	Did not qualify	Did not qualify	Champions defeated (Argentina) Lanús	N/A
Cruzeiro	Champions defeated (Peru) Sporting Cristal	Group stage eliminated finished second in the group	Did not qualify	Runner-up lost to (Germany) Borussia Dortmund
Flamengo	Did not qualify	Group stage eliminated finished second in the group	Did not qualify	N/A
Grêmio	Quarterfinals eliminated by (Brazil) Cruzeiro	Group stage eliminated finished fourth in the group	Did not qualify	N/A
Portuguesa	Did not qualify	Did not qualify	Round of 16 eliminated by (Brazil) Atl. Mineiro	N/A
Rio Branco	Did not qualify	Did not qualify	Round of 16 eliminated by (Colombia) Deportes Tolima	N/A
Santos	Did not qualify	Group stage eliminated finished third in the group	Did not qualify	N/A
São Paulo	Did not qualify	Runner-up lost to (Argentina) River Plate	Did not qualify	N/A
Vasco	Did not qualify	Group stage eliminated finished second in the group	Did not qualify	N/A
Vitória	Did not qualify	Did not qualify	Quarterfinals eliminated by (Argentina) Lanús	N/A

== Brazil national team ==
The following table lists all the games played by the Brazil national football team in official competitions and friendly matches during 1997.

Date	Opposition	Result	Score	Brazil scorers	Competition
February 26, 1997	Poland	W	4-2	Giovanni (2), Ronaldo (2)	International Friendly
April 2, 1997	Chile	W	4-0	Ronaldo (2), Romário (2)	International Friendly
April 30, 1997	Mexico	W	4-0	Leonardo, Romário (3)	International Friendly
May 30, 1997	Norway	L	2-4	Djalminha, Romário	International Friendly
June 3, 1997	France	D	1-1	Roberto Carlos	Tournoi de France
June 8, 1997	Italy	D	3-3	Lombardo (own goal), Ronaldo, Romário	Tournoi de France
June 10, 1997	England	W	1-0	Romário	Tournoi de France
June 13, 1997	Costa Rica	W	5-0	Djalminha, González (own goal), Ronaldo (2), Romário	Copa América
June 16, 1997	Mexico	W	3-2	Aldair, Romero (own goal), Leonardo	Copa América
June 19, 1997	Colombia	W	2-0	Dunga, Edmundo	Copa América
June 22, 1997	Paraguay	W	2-0	Ronaldo (2)	Copa América
June 26, 1997	Peru	W	7-0	Denílson, Flávio Conceição, Romário (2), Leonardo (2), Djalminha	Copa América
June 29, 1997	Bolivia	W	3-1	Denílson, Ronaldo, Zé Roberto	Copa América
August 10, 1997	South Korea	W	2-1	Ronaldo, Sonny Anderson	International Friendly
August 13, 1997	Japan	W	3-0	Flávio Conceição (2), Júnior Baiano	International Friendly
September 10, 1997	Ecuador	W	4-2	Denílson, Dodô (2), Emerson	International Friendly
October 9, 1997	Morocco	W	2-0	Denílson (2)	International Friendly
November 11, 1997	Wales	W	3-0	Zinho, Rivaldo, Rodrigo Fabri	International Friendly
December 7, 1997	South Africa	W	2-1	Romário, Bebeto	International Friendly
December 12, 1997	Saudi Arabia	W	3-0	César Sampaio, Romário (2)	Confederations Cup
December 14, 1997	Australia	D	0-0	-	Confederations Cup
December 16, 1997	Mexico	W	3-2	Romário, Denílson, Júnior Baiano	Confederations Cup
December 19, 1997	Czech Republic	W	2-0	Romário, Ronaldo	Confederations Cup
December 21, 1997	Australia	W	6-0	Ronaldo (3), Romário (3)	Confederations Cup

== Women's football ==
=== Brazil women's national football team ===
The following table lists all the games played by the Brazil women's national football team in official competitions and friendly matches during 1997.

Date	Opposition	Result	Score	Brazil scorers	Competition
June 6, 1997	Netherlands	W	2–1	unavailable	International Friendly
June 7, 1997	Netherlands	L	0–1	-	International Friendly
December 11, 1997	United States	L	1–2	Pretinha	International Friendly
December 13, 1997	United States	W	1–0	Roseli	International Friendly

=== Domestic competition champions ===
Competition	Champion
Campeonato Brasileiro	São Paulo
Campeonato Carioca	Vasco (FFERJ); Campo Grande (LIDERJ)
Campeonato Paulista	São Paulo
