= Mazagão Atlético Clube =

Football club in Mazagão, Amapá, Brazil

Mazagão
- Full name: Mazagão Atlético Clube
- Founded: 23 January 1979; 46 years ago
- Ground: Zerão
- Capacity: 13,680
- 2011: Amapaense, 4th of 10
Home colours	Away colours

Mazagão Atlético Clube, commonly known as Mazagão (Brazilian Portuguese: [mazaˈɡɐ͂w]), is a Brazilian football club based in based in Mazagão, Amapá. The club's senior team is inactive since 2014, having last played in a professional match in August 2011.

== History ==
The club was founded on 23 January 1979. Mazagão finished in the second position in the Campeonato Amapaense in 2000, losing the competition to Santos-AP.

== Stadium ==
Mazagão Atlético Clube play their home games at Estádio Aluizio Videira, nicknamed Videirão. The stadium has a maximum capacity of 2,000 people.
