= Clube Atlético Aliança =

Aliança
- Full name: Clube Atlético Aliança
- Nickname: Galo Santanense
- Founded: 15 November 1995; 30 years ago
- Dissolved: 2008; 18 years ago
- Ground: Zerão
- Capacity: 13,680
Home colours	Away colours

Clube Atlético Aliança, commonly referred to as Aliança, was a Brazilian football club based in Santana, Amapá. Founded in 1995, it last competed in the 2003 Campeonato Amapaense before folding in 2008 due to continuing financial constraints.

== History ==
The club was founded on 15 November 1995. Aliança won the Campeonato Amapaense in 1998, and finished as runners-up in 1999, losing the competition to Ypiranga.

== Honours ==
- Campeonato Amapaense
  - Winners (1): 1998
  - Runners-up (1): 1999

== Stadium ==
Clube Atlético Aliança played their home games at Estádio Antônio Villela, nicknamed Vilelão. The stadium has a maximum capacity of 3,000 people.
