= Brazilian football league system =

- Country: Brazil
- Sport: Association football

The Brazilian football league system is a series of interconnected leagues for football clubs in Brazil. It consists of several independent pyramids, which are the national pyramid and the states pyramids. As these pyramids are independent, clubs usually compete in a state pyramid and a national pyramid. Both the national pyramid and the states pyramids consist of several levels. The best placed teams in the states championships compete in the Copa do Brasil.

== Structure ==
There are two simultaneous and independent functioning pyramids in Brazil's football, the national pyramid and the states pyramids.

While the national competitions are organized by CBF, the state championships are organized by the respective football federations of each state (for example, the Campeonato Pernambucano is organized by the Pernambuco Football Federation).

The national pyramid competitions start in May and end in December. The state pyramids have varying durations and schedules in each state. In states with clubs competing in the national first and second divisions, the state championships run from January/February to April/May.

Most states have at least one secondary tournament, involving smaller clubs not in the top two leagues of the national championship. These lesser championships runs from July to December. Besides the trophy, it may award the winner(s) places in the main tournament or in the Brazilian Cup next year.

Smaller states, whose clubs do not take part in national competitions have longer competitions, usually running during the "winter" months: April to October.

== National league ==
In the national pyramid, there are four leagues, the Série A, Série B, the Série C and the Série D. The Série A, Série B and Série C currently consist of 20 teams each. Série D was contested by 40 teams, expanded to 68 in 2016. Série A and Série B are contested in a double-round-robin format by all clubs; Série C and Série D have regional groups. Each year, the four worst placed clubs in the Série A are relegated to the Série B and the four top placed clubs in the Série B are promoted to Série A. This relation of four promoted and four relegated is the same for the other levels.

The clubs competing in the Série D are the bottom four from last season's Série C and the best placed state championship clubs from the previous season which are not competing in the Série A, B or C. Clubs that are successful in their state leagues can rise higher in the pyramid, be promoted to the Série D, and eventually to higher levels. Some state federations organize special competitions with the purpose of qualifying teams to the Série D.

As a result of the rules detailed above, it is possible (and not unheard of) for a minor state championship club to rise to the Série A, and become successful in the competition. To achieve this, a club must qualify in the state championship and, later, qualify in Séries D, C and B. Examples of clubs that went all the way up from the least state league until Série A are: Paraná Clube (founded in 1989, played Série A in 1993), São Caetano (founded in 1989, played Série A in 2000 and finished runner-up), Brasiliense (founded in 2000, played Série A in 2005), Grêmio Barueri (founded in 1989, played Série A in 2009) and Ipatinga (founded 1998, to play Série A in 2008). None of them are in 2024 Série A, but Paraná and São Caetano had relative success in Série A for a while. Brasiliense and Ipatinga, however, never played a second year in this competition, being quickly relegated to Série B. Grêmio Barueri, for its part, only lasted in the first level for two years, before being relegated. The latter three teams eventually participated in the Série D in 2014, failing to achieve promotion.

The reverse is also possible: a club from Série A can eventually be relegated to the very least state league. A recent example is the rich in history América-MG (founded in 1912, relegated from Série A in 2001, to Série C in 2005 and to state second division in 2007). América played in the Série C in 2008 and 2009, avoiding the Série D. The club is back to National competitions and to its state first division, reaching Série A in 2011, although relegated to Série B in 2012. Currently, at least eight clubs (Fluminense, Náutico, Fortaleza, Vitória, Bahia, Guarani, Juventude and América-MG) have been relegated to Série C and successfully reappeared in Série A. Santa Cruz, a Série A club in 2006, fell to Série D in 2010, but in 2016 is back to the top flight. Other clubs formerly in Série A that were relegated to Séries C, D and below have not so far recovered their strength. For example, America-RJ (as of 2024, only playing in the state league), Remo (as of 2024, in the Série C), América de Natal (as of 2024, in the Série D) and Paysandu (as of 2024, in the Série B).

Since the national and state pyramids are independent a team can be in a national division and also be in a lower division in the state league in the same season. In 2018, Oeste played both the national Série B and the São Paulo state Série A2, the São Paulo state league second level. In fact, it occurs in São Paulo every season, since as of 2024 a total of 17 teams (13 in A+B+C and 4 in D) compete in a national division (and only 16 teams in the Campeonato Paulista top tier).

== State leagues ==
In the state pyramid, which consists of several independent state championships, the participating clubs, which also include Série A, Série B and Série C clubs, are limited to their own states (however, there are some minor exceptions, like in the Campeonato Brasiliense, where Unaí from Minas Gerais, and Luziânia and Bosque Formosa Esporte Clube from Goiás also compete, due to their proximity to Brasília, the capital of the Brazilian Federal District. The leagues are usually divided in two, three or four levels. The number of clubs per level, as well as the number of levels, are different in each state. For example, in São Paulo there are 16 clubs in the first level, but in Minas Gerais there are 12, and in Rondônia there are only eight clubs. Also, the number of promoted and relegated clubs are different from one state to the other. Since 2009, the best placed clubs in the state leagues not already qualified for Série A, B, or C qualify for the Série D.

State championships may include obscure formats or experiment with proposed innovations in rules. As the Série A, Série B and Série C clubs usually have to be seeded to avoid fixture congestion, some rules adopted may be quite unfair. In the 2008 Campeonato Carioca, the big four (Botafogo, Flamengo, Fluminense and Vasco da Gama) always played home against the other participating clubs.

== Copa do Brasil ==
The Copa do Brasil is contested between the winners and best placed clubs of the previous season state championships, and by the best placed clubs in the CBF ranking. From 2013, it is played between the months of April and November.

== State cups ==
The state cups are usually played during the second half of the year, after the state championships have concluded. The participating teams are clubs not competing in the national championships and reserve teams of clubs competing in the national championships. Examples of such competitions are the Copa FGF, the Copa Paulista de Futebol and the Copa Rio.

== Inter-state tournaments ==
Several inter-state club championships have been held along the decades, such as the Torneio Rio-São Paulo (1933–1966, 1993, 1997–2002), Copa Centro-Oeste (1999–2002), Copa Norte (1997–2002), Copa Sul-Minas (2000–2002), Copa do Nordeste (held intermittently since 1994), Copa Verde (since 2014), and Primeira Liga (2016–2017).

== Current system ==
As of 2026

Level	League/Division
National Championships
1	Campeonato Brasileiro Série A 20 clubs Bottom four teams relegated
2	Campeonato Brasileiro Série B 20 clubs Top two teams promoted + 4 promotion play-off spot Bottom four teams relegated
3	Campeonato Brasileiro Série C 20 clubs Top two teams of second stage groups promoted Bottom two teams of first stage relegated
4	Campeonato Brasileiro Série D 96 clubs divided in 16 groups of 6 Top six teams promoted No relegation^{1}
State Championships^{1}
5	State Championships Top Divisions (27); Acre – Alagoas – Amapá – Amazonas – Bahia – Ceará – Distrito Federal – Espírito Santo – Goiás – Maranhão – Mato Grosso – Mato Grosso do Sul – Minas Gerais – Pará – Paraíba – Paraná – Pernambuco – Piauí – Rio de Janeiro – Rio Grande do Norte – Rio Grande do Sul – Rondônia – Roraima – Santa Catarina – São Paulo – Sergipe – Tocantins
6	State Championships Second Divisions (25); Alagoas – Amapá – Amazonas – Bahia – Ceará – Distrito Federal – Espírito Santo – Goiás – Maranhão – Mato Grosso – Mato Grosso do Sul – Minas Gerais – Pará – Paraíba – Paraná – Pernambuco – Piauí – Rio de Janeiro – Rio Grande do Norte – Rio Grande do Sul – Rondônia – Santa Catarina – São Paulo – Sergipe – Tocantins
7	State Championships Third Divisions (11); Ceará – Goiás – Minas Gerais – Pará – Paraíba – Paraná – Pernambuco – Rio de Janeiro – Rio Grande do Sul – Santa Catarina – São Paulo
8	State Championships Fourth Divisions (2); Rio de Janeiro – São Paulo
9	State Championships Fifth Divisions (2); Rio de Janeiro – São Paulo

^{1}The state championships are not officially hierarchically behind the Série D, but they are used by CBF as a way to promote clubs to the competition.

The teams playing in the four national divisions also play the state championships in the same year.

The state championships are the lowest level for professional clubs.

There are amateur competitions organized by the federation of each city. However, they are an independent system, and can't get professional status without the approval of the respective state board.

=== Current teams in Campeonato Brasileiro ===
The teams from each state participating in the 2026 Campeonato Brasileiro Series A, B and C are listed below. Participation in Serie D varies every year.

==== 2026 Serie A ====
Number of teams	State	Team(s)
6	São Paulo	Corinthians, Mirassol, Palmeiras, Red Bull Bragantino, Santos, São Paulo
4	Rio de Janeiro	Botafogo, Flamengo, Fluminense, Vasco da Gama
2	Rio Grande do Sul	Grêmio, Internacional
2	Bahia	Bahia, Vitória
2	Minas Gerais	Atlético Mineiro, Cruzeiro
2	Paraná	Athletico Paranaense, Coritiba
1	Santa Catarina	Chapecoense
1	Pará	Remo

==== 2026 Serie B ====
Number of teams	State	Team(s)
4	São Paulo	Botafogo-SP, Novorizontino, Ponte Preta, São Bernardo
3	Goiás	Atlético Goianiense, Goiás, Vila Nova
2	Ceará	Ceará, Fortaleza
2	Minas Gerais	América Mineiro, Athletic
2	Paraná	Londrina, Operário Ferroviário
2	Pernambuco	Náutico, Sport
2	Santa Catarina	Avaí, Criciúma
1	Alagoas	CRB
1	Mato Grosso	Cuiabá
1	Rio Grande do Sul	Juventude

==== 2026 Serie C ====
Number of teams	State	Team(s)
4	São Paulo	Ferroviária, Guarani, Inter de Limeira, Ituano
3	Santa Catarina	Barra, Brusque, Figueirense
2	Rio Grande do Sul	Caxias, Ypiranga
2	Sergipe	Confiança, Itabaiana
1	Amazonas	Amazonas
1	Ceará	Floresta
1	Goiás	Anápolis
1	Maranhão	Maranhão
1	Pará	Paysandu
1	Paraíba	Botafogo-PB
1	Paraná	Maringá
1	Pernambuco	Santa Cruz
1	Rio de Janeiro	Volta Redonda

==== Teams by state ====
In 2026 the following states will have teams in Series A, B and C. Rules for classification: 1) Most teams in A; 2) Most teams in A+B; 3) Most teams in A+B+C

Pos.	State	A	B	C	Total
1	(São Paulo (state)) São Paulo	6	4	4	14
2	(Rio de Janeiro (state)) Rio de Janeiro	4	0	1	5
3	(Paraná (state)) Paraná	2	2	1	5
4	Minas Gerais	2	2	0	4
5	Rio Grande do Sul	2	1	2	5
6	Bahia	2	0	0	2
7	(Santa Catarina (state)) Santa Catarina	1	2	3	6
8	Pará	1	0	1	2
9	Goiás	0	3	1	4
10	Ceará	0	2	1	3
11	Pernambuco	0	2	1	3
12	Alagoas	0	1	0	1
13	Mato Grosso	0	1	0	1
14	Sergipe	0	0	2	2
15	(Amazonas (Brazilian state)) Amazonas	0	0	1	1
16	Paraíba	0	0	1	1

== State league pyramid examples ==
The Campeonato Paulista table below is an example of a state league pyramid. It is divided in five levels. The first four levels are disputed by a fixed number of teams each, while the fifth level can be disputed by any clubs not in the first four levels. As of 2025, 15 teams had taken place on the state's fifth level. The competitions are organized by the São Paulo Football Federation.

Campeonato Paulista
Level	League/Division
1	Série A1; 16 clubs
2	Série A2; 16 clubs
3	Série A3; 16 clubs
4	Série A4; 16 clubs
5	Segunda Divisão; 15 clubs

The Campeonato Catarinense table below is another example of a state league pyramid. It is divided in three levels. The first two levels are disputed by 10 teams each. As of 2018 the third level was disputed by only 8 clubs. The competitions are organized by the Santa Catarina Football Federation.

Campeonato Catarinense
Level	League/Division
1	Série A 10 clubs
2	Série B 10 clubs
3	Série C 8 clubs

The Campeonato Mineiro table below is another example of a state league pyramid. It is divided in three levels. The first and second levels are played by 12 teams each. As of 2019, the third level had 16 participants. The competitions are organized by the Minas Gerais Football Federation.

Campeonato Mineiro
Level	League/Division
1	Módulo I 12 clubs
2	Módulo II; 12 clubs
3	Segunda Divisão; 16 clubs

== Women's league system ==
The Brazilian women's football league system consists of three national divisions and 27 state leagues.

As of 2026

Level	League/Division
National Championships
1	Série A1; 18 clubs Bottom two teams relegated
2	Série A2; 16 clubs Top four teams promoted Bottom two teams relegated
3	Série A3; 32 clubs divided into 8 groups of 4 Semifinalists promoted No relegation^{1}
State Championships^{1}
4	State Championships Top Divisions (27); Acre – Alagoas – Amapá – Amazonas – Bahia – Ceará – Distrito Federal – Espírito Santo – Goiás – Maranhão – Mato Grosso – Mato Grosso do Sul – Minas Gerais – Pará – Paraíba – Paraná – Pernambuco – Piauí – Rio de Janeiro – Rio Grande do Norte – Rio Grande do Sul – Rondônia – Roraima – Santa Catarina – São Paulo – Sergipe – Tocantins

^{1}The state championships are not officially hierarchically behind the Série A3, but they are used by CBF as a way to promote clubs to the competition.

The teams playing in the three national divisions also play the state championships in the same year.
