= Campeonato Amapaense Série B =

Football league in Amapá, Brazil

Amapazão Série B
- Founded: 1955; 71 years ago
- Country: Brazil
- State: Amapá
- Confederation: FAF
- Level on pyramid: 2
- Promotion to: Amapazão
- Current champions: EC Macapá (2nd title) (2025)
- Most championships: Oratório; União (3 titles each)
- Website: FAF Official website

The Campeonato Amapaense Série B, also known as Amapazão Série B is the second tier of the professional state football league in the Brazilian state of Amapá. It is run by the Amapá Football Federation (FAF).

Having their first tournament played in 1955, the division was often not disputed, and became a qualifying stage to the Campeonato Amapaense in 2005 and 2007. After that year, the second division was abandoned, but it was played again in 2024.

== List of champions ==
Above is the list with all champions of Amapá second division:

=== Amateur era ===
Season	Champions	Runners-up
1955	Juventus	
1956	Santa Cruz	
1957	Unknown	
1958	Fazendinha (Note: Santana won the tournament, but lost the title after fielding a player without conditions to play.)	Manganês
1959–1962	Not held	
1963	Municipal	Fazendinha
1964	Ypiranga	Independente
1965–1968	Unknown	
1969	Santa Cruz	
1970–1975	Unknown	
1976	Oratório	
1977	Oratório	Londrina
1978	Unknown	
1979	Oratório	Londrina
1980	Londrina	
1981	União	
1982	União	Lagoa
1983	União	
1984	Lagoa	
1985–1986	Unknown	
1987	Ypiranga	
1988	Cristal	Lagoa
1989	Macapá	Lagoa

=== Professional era ===
Season	Champions	Runners-up
2005	Cristal	Macapá
2006	Not held (Note: Cristal and Santos were automatically promoted as they were the only teams interested in playing)	
2007	Santos	São Paulo
2008–2023	Not held	
2024	Portuguesa	Cristal
2025	Macapá	São José

== Titles by team ==
Club	Wins	Winning years
Oratório	3	1976, 1977, 1979
União	3	1981, 1982, 1983
Santa Cruz	2	1956, 1969
Ypiranga	2	1964, 1987
Cristal	2	1988, 2005
Macapá	2	1989, 2025
Juventus	1	1955
Municipal	1	1963
Lagoa	1	1984
Londrina	1	1980
Santos	1	2007
Portuguesa	1	2024
