= Amapá Clube =

Football club in Macapá, Brazil

Amapá
- Full name: Amapá Clube
- Nickname: Zebra da Presidente Vargas
- Founded: 23 February 1944; 82 years ago
- Dissolved: 2015; 11 years ago
- Ground: Glicério Marques
- Capacity: 5,630
Home colours	Away colours

Amapá Clube, commonly referred to as simply Amapá, was a Brazilian football club based in Macapá, Amapá. Founded in 1944, it last competed in the 2008 Campeonato Amapaense before folding in 2015 due to continuing financial constraints.

They were the second-most successful club in the amateur era of the Amapazão with 10 titles to their name. The most successful period in their history was in the late 1980s, when they won the league in three consecutive years, between 1986 and 1988. Following the professionalization of football in Amapá, however, their highest finishing position was second place in 1991, 1993, 1998, 2005 and 2006.

The club was located in the centre of Macapá and traditionally wore black-and-white striped shirts, black shorts and white socks. The club crest was inspired by that of Botafogo de Futebol de Regatas, sporting a single white star inside of a black badge. The club mascot is the zebra. Amapá had a historic rivalry with Macapá, with whom they played the Clássico Vovô.

== History ==
Amapá Clube was founded on 23 February 1944 by Eloy Nunes Monteiro, Francisco Serrano, Pauxy Gentil Nunes, Newton Cardoso, Jose Serafim Coelho, João Vieira de Assis, Glicério de Souza Marques, Raimundo Nonato Araújo Filho, Raimundo de Campos Monteiro and Zoilo Pereira Córdoba. The meeting took place in the residence located in front of the first building of the Macapá City Hall – The state governor Janary Gentil Nunes attended the meeting, but did not sign the founding minutes.

The club's first matches took place at the Praça da Matriz field, currently located in Praça Veiga Cabral. (Note: Called 'Praça Veiga Cabral' nowadays.) In its first year of foundation, Amapá took part in the Campeonato Amapaense. The club won its first championship the following year, beating Macapá in the finals.

In 1959, they won a friendly tournament played in Guyana, with two victories in three games played.

== Honours ==
- Campeonato Amapaense
  - Winners (10): 1945, 1950, 1951, 1953, 1973, 1975, 1979, 1987, 1988, 1990
  - Runners-up (9): 1963, 1977, 1982, 1989, 1991, 1993, 1998, 2005, 2006
