= Torneio Maria Quitéria =

- Organiser(s): Municipality of Salvador
- Founded: 1996
- Abolished: 1998
- Region: Bahia, Brazil
- Teams: 4
- Most championships: Bahia; Palmeiras; Vitória (1 title each)

The Torneio Maria Quitéria (English: Maria Quitéria Cup), was a friendly tournament organized by the Municipality of Salvador, Bahia, that occurred in the preparation period between the end of the state leagues and the beginning of the Brazilian Championship. It took place in 3 seasons: 1996, 1997, 1998. The tournament name is in honor of Maria Quitéria, which had great importance during the Brazilian War of Independence.

== Format ==
The tournament was played in a knockout format with the four teams, with the two winners advancing to the final; In the first edition, the losers disputed a decision for the third place.

== List of champions ==
Following is the final results of the all three editions of Torneio Maria Quitéria:

Year	Champion	Final match	Runners-up	Third place	Third place match	Fourth place
1996	Vitória; BA	1–1; 4–2 (pen.)	Coritiba; PR	Bahia; BA	0–0; 3–2 (pen.)	Internacional; RS
1997	Palmeiras; SP	0–0; 5–4 (pen.)	Flamengo; RJ	Bahia; BA	Not played	Vitória; BA
1998	Bahia; BA	3–2	Corinthians; SP	Palmeiras; SP	Not played	Vitória; BA
