= Quarentinha (footballer, born 1934) =

Brazilian footballer

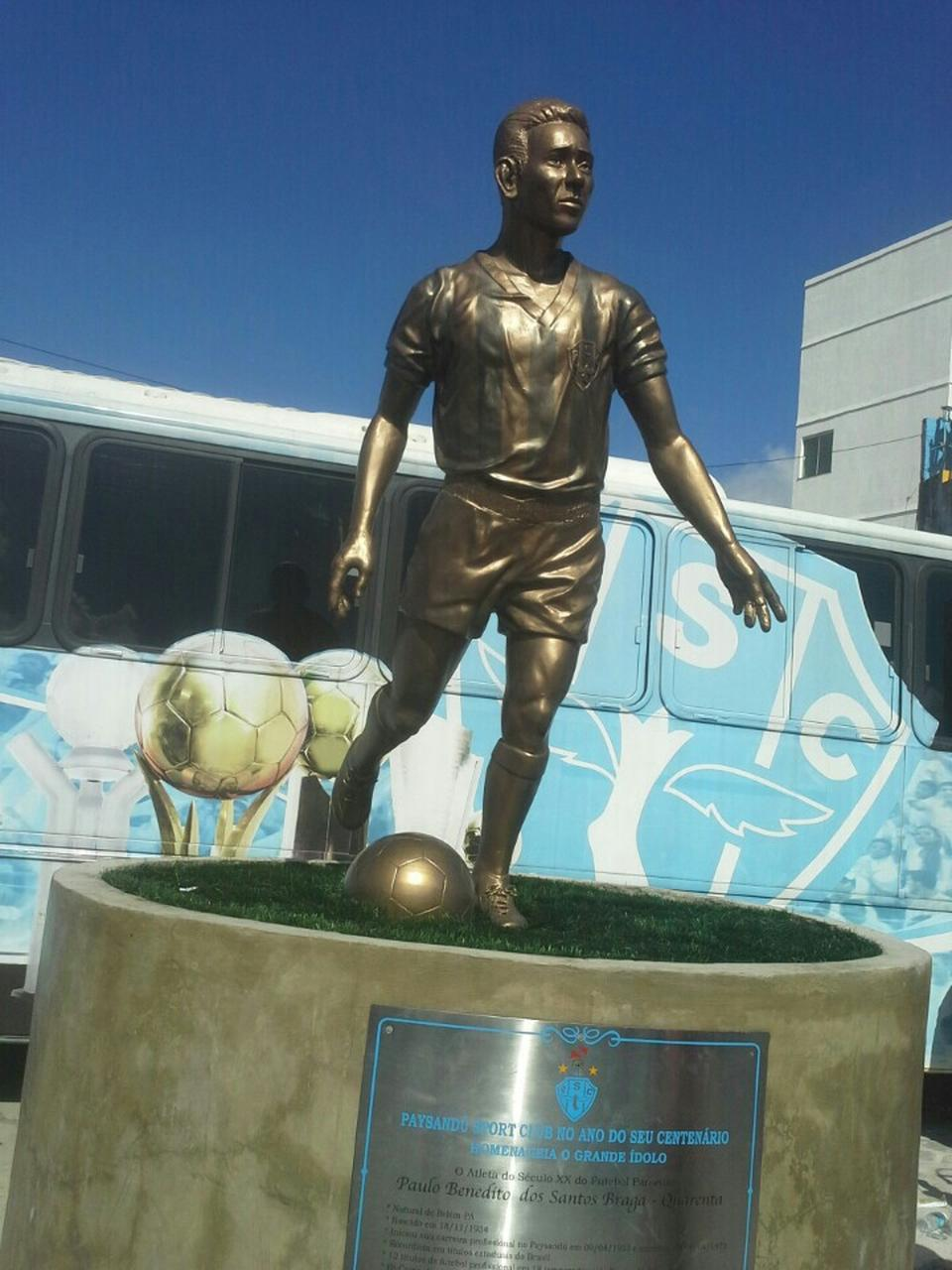
- Quarentinha's sculpture

Personal information
- Full name: Paulo Benedito dos Santos Braga
- Date of birth: 18 November 1934 (age 91)
- Place of birth: Belém, Brazil
- Height: 1.58 m (5 ft 2 in)
- Position: Midfielder

Senior career*
Years	Team	Apps	(Gls)
1955–1973	Paysandu	750	(86)
- * Club domestic league appearances and goals as of 31 January 2024

Paulo Benedito dos Santos Braga (born 18 November 1934), better known as Quarentinha, and sometimes as Quarentinha II, is a Brazilian former professional footballer who played as a forward.

== Career ==
His nickname came from his childhood, in reference to Paysandu Quarenta. Quarentinha made history for Paysandu, surpassing the record of 12 state titles won by the club. He is considered by many to be the greatest player in Paysandu's history.

== Personal life ==
Quarentinha suffered a robbery on 5 August 2019, at the age of 84, and suffered a dislocated shoulder. At age 87, he underwent emergency surgery due to blood pressure problems.

== Honours ==
Paysandu

- Campeonato Paraense: 1956, 1957, 1959, 1961, 1962, 1963, 1965, 1966, 1967, 1969, 1971, 1972
