= Federação Amapaense de Futebol =

Brazilian football federation

- Formation: 26 June 1945; 81 years ago
- Type: List of international sport federations
- Headquarters: Macapá, Amapá, Brazil
- Official language: Portuguese
- Website: fafamapa.com.br

The Federação Amapaense de Futebol (English: Football Association of Amapá state) was founded on June 26, 1945, and it manages all the official football tournaments within the state of Amapá, which are the Campeonato Amapaense and the Campeonato Amapaense lower levels, and represents the clubs at the Brazilian Football Confederation (CBF).

== Current clubs in Brasileirão ==
Old logo.

List of clubs from Amapá competing in the 2023 season across the Brazilian football league system.

| Club | City |
Série D
| Trem | Macapá |
