= Ypiranga Clube =

Football club in Macapá, Brazil

Ypiranga-AP
- Full name: Ypiranga Clube
- Nickname(s): Negro Anil (Black Indigo); Clube da Torre (Tower's Club)
- Founded: 15 May 1963; 61 years ago
- Ground: Zerão
- Capacity: 13,680
- President: Ricardo Oliveira
- Head coach: Renato Bessa
- League: Campeonato Amapaense
- 2024: Amapaense, 5th of 8
- Website: http://www.ypirangaclube.com.br/
Home colors	Away colors

The Ypiranga Clube, commonly known as Ypiranga-AP (Brazilian Portuguese: [ipiˈɾɐ͂ga ˈdo amaˈpa]), or simply Ypiranga, is a Brazilian multi-sport club based in Macapá, Amapá. The club is most notable for its association football team, that plays in the Campeonato Amapaense, the top division in the Amapá state football league system. (Note: As of this season, Ypiranga's last national league appearance was in the 2021 Campeonato Brasileiro Série D.)

The Ypiranga Clube was founded in 1963. Its home stadium is the Zerão stadium, capacity 5,000. They play in blue and black striped shirts, black shorts and black socks.

Ypiranga is the second-best ranked team from Amapá in CBF's national club ranking, being placed 102nd overall.

Ypiranga's main rivals are Trem, with whom they contest the Tremy, and São José.

== History ==
The Ypiranga Clube was founded on 15 May 1963, by the initiative of the father Vitório Galliani, vicar of Igreja Nossa Senhora da Conceição, who lead young members of the Juventude Oratoriana do Trem (JOT), a movement connected to Vitório Galliani's church. Under influence of Vitório Galliani, it was established that the club's official colors would be black and blue, the same colors of Italy's Internazionale, club supported by the father. Guaracy Freitas was elected as the club's first president.

In 1963, the club joined Federação Amapaense de Desportos. In 1964, Ypiranga disputed its first competition, the Second Division of the Amapaense Amateur Football Championship, and managed by Francisco Sales de Lima (nicknamed "Chicão"), the club won the competition, after defeating Independente 6–3 in the final, at Augusto Antunes Stadium. The champion team was composed of the following players: Manguinha, Lindoval, Barata, Guaracy and Suzico, Adauto and Ary, Peninha, Artur, Narciso and Almeida. The reservers: Elcio, Horácio, Otílio, Gadelha, Lery, Trombone, Tônati, Sabá Balieiro, and Joaquim Neto.

In 1976, Ypiranga won its first state championship, after the club and Santana drew 0–0 at Estádio Municipal Glicério de Souza Marques. The champion players were Emanuel, Buiuna, Damasceno, Waldir and Pitéo, Duranil and Dival, Ananízio, Tadeu, Jason and Dilermano, and the reserves were Odival, Paulo César, Bolinha, Orlandino, João Oliveira, Padeirinho Dewson and Nena. In 1986, after a poor campaign, Ypiranga was relegated to the Second Division of Campeonato Amapaense. However, the team won the second division in 1987, returning to the first division in 1988.

In 1991, under the administration of the chairman Luiz Góes, Ypiranga became a professional team. In 1992, Ypiranga reached its first professional competition title, after winning the state championship. The players of that team were Maurício, Zé Preta, Ponga, Cid and Neirivaldo, Edgar, Edvaldo and Serginho, Tiaguinho, Miranda and Jorginho Macapá, managed by Dadá Maravilha, who had won the 1970 World Cup as a player.

== Stadium ==
Like other clubs in the state, Ypiranga does not have its own stadium. Since 2017, all football matches in Amapá are held at Zerão. Up until 2014, the team also played at Glicerão, which is currently undergoing renovation.

== Symbols and nickname ==
Ypiranga's logo is uncommon, because it features a church's tower. This church's tower is located at Igreja de Nossa Senhora da Conceição, which is a church located in Trem neighborhood. The club's nickname, Clube da Torre, is also a reference to the church's tower, and means Tower Club in English.

== Honours ==
=== State ===
- Campeonato Amapaense
  - Winners (10): 1976, 1992, 1994, 1997, 1999, 2002, 2003, 2004, 2018, 2020
  - Runners-up (3): 1969, 2012, 2019
- Campeonato Amapaense Segunda Divisão
  - Winners (2): 1964, 1987

=== Women's Football ===
- Campeonato Amapaense de Futebol Feminino
  - Winners (3): 2021, 2023, 2024
