= Sociedade Esportiva e Recreativa São José =

Football club in Macapá, Brazil

São José-AP
- Full name: Sociedade Esportiva e Recreativa São José
- Nicknames: Tricolor do Laguinho; Pitbull da Amazônia
- Founded: 26 August 1946; 80 years ago
- Ground: Zerão
- Capacity: 13,680
- President: Otaciano Júnior
- League: Campeonato Amapaense
- 2025: Amapaense Segunda Divisão, 2nd of 11 (promoted)
- Website: https://sersaojose.com.br/
Home colours	Away colours

Sociedade Esportiva e Recreativa São José, commonly known as São José-AP (Brazilian Portuguese: [ˈsɐ͂wʒozɛ ˈdoamaˈpa]), or simply São José, is a Brazilian multi-sport club based in Macapá, Amapá. The club is most notable for its association football team, which last played in a professional match in September 2015.

They competed in the Série C once.

== History ==
The club was founded on 26 August 1946. They won the Campeonato Amapaense in 1970, 1971, 1993, 2005, 2006 and in 2009. São José competed in the Série C in 2005, when they were eliminated in the First Stage.

== Stadium ==
Sociedade Esportiva e Recreativa São José play their home games at Estádio Milton Corrêa, commonly known as Zerão. The stadium has a maximum capacity of 10,000 people.

== Honours ==
- Campeonato Amapaense
  - Winners (7): 1970, 1971, 1972, 1993, 2005, 2006, 2009
  - Runners-up (6): 1956, 1972, 1997, 2001, 2004, 2008
