= Santana Esporte Clube =

Football club in Santana, Brazil

Santana
- Full name: Santana Esporte Clube
- Nickname(s): Canário do Porto
- Founded: 25 September 1955; 69 years ago
- Ground: Zerão
- Capacity: 13,680
- President: Gerson Fernandes
- Head Coach: Isac Pinheiro
- League: Campeonato Amapaense
- 2024: Amapaense, 6th of 8
Home colours	Away colours

Santana Esporte Clube, commonly referred to as Santana (Brazilian Portuguese: [sɐ͂ˈtɐ͂na]), is a Brazilian football club based in Santana, Amapá. The team competes in the Campeonato Amapaense, the top division in the Amapá state football league system. (Note: As of this season, Santana's last national league appearance was in the 2021 Campeonato Brasileiro Série D.)

They won the Campeonato Amapaense seven times. The club's traditional rivals are Independente, and games between the two are known as the Clássico do Porto.

Santana is the fifth-best ranked team from Amapá in CBF's national club ranking, being placed 236th overall.

== History ==
The club was founded on September 25, 1955. They won the Campeonato Amapaense in 1960, 1961, 1962, 1965, 1968, 1972, 1985.

== Stadium ==
Santana Esporte Clube play their home games at Estádio Municipal de Santana. The stadium has a maximum capacity of 5,000 people.

== Honours ==
=== State ===
- Campeonato Amapaense
  - Winners (7): 1960, 1961, 1962, 1965, 1968, 1972, 1985
  - Runners-up (4): 1976, 2009, 2010, 2020

=== Women's Football ===
- Campeonato Amapaense de Futebol Feminino
  - Winners (1): 2017
