= Oratório Recreativo Clube =

Football club in Macapá, Brazil

Oratório
- Full name: Oratório Recreativo Clube
- Nickname: Orca Demolidora
- Founded: 15 August 1969; 57 years ago
- Ground: Zerão
- Capacity: 13,680
- Head coach: Fábio Duarte
- League: Campeonato Brasileiro Série D Campeonato Amapaense
- 2025: Amapaense, 2nd of 8
Home colors	Away colors

Oratório Recreativo Clube, commonly referred to as Oratório (Brazilian Portuguese: [ˈoɾatɔɾiu]), is a Brazilian football club based in Macapá, Amapá. The team competes in the Campeonato Amapaense, the top division in the Amapá state football league system.

The men's team won the Campeonato Amapaense once. The women's team competed twice in the Copa do Brasil de Futebol Feminino.

== History ==
The club was founded on 15 August 1969, by member of the Nossa Senhora da Conceição Church community.

== Stadium ==
Like other clubs in the state, Oratório does not have its own stadium. Since 2017, all football matches in Amapá are held at Zerão. Up until 2014, the team also played at Glicerão, which is currently undergoing renovation.

== Men's team ==
Oratório was the first club from Amapá to compete in the Copa São Paulo de Juniores, participating in 2001. They won the Campeonato Amapaense in 2012.

== Women's team ==
They competed in the Copa do Brasil de Futebol Feminino in 2009, when they were eliminated by Pinheirense, and in 2010, when they were eliminated by Roraima

== Honours ==
=== State ===
- Campeonato Amapaense
  - Winners (1): 2012
  - Runners-up (1): 2024
- Campeonato Amapaense Segunda Divisão
  - Winners (3): 1976, 1977, 1979

=== Women's Football ===
- Campeonato Amapaense de Futebol Feminino
  - Winners (8): 2009, 2010, 2011, 2015, 2016, 2018, 2019 2020
