= Independente Esporte Clube =

Football club in Santana, Brazil

Independente-AP
- Full name: Independente Esporte Clube
- Nickname: Carcará da Vila Maia
- Founded: 19 January 1962; 63 years ago
- Ground: Zerão
- Capacity: 13,680
- President: Rodrigo Castro Tork
- Head Coach: João Paulo Babaloo
- League: Campeonato Amapaense
- 2024: Amapaense, 3rd of 8
Home colours	Away colours

Independente Esporte Clube, commonly known as Independente-AP (Brazilian Portuguese: [ĩdepẽjˈdẽjtʃi ˈdo amaˈpa]) or simply Independente, is a Brazilian multi-sport club based in Santana, Amapá. The club is most notable for its association football team, that plays in the Campeonato Amapaense, the top division in the Amapá state football league system.

The club's traditional rivals are Santana, and games between the two are known as the Clássico do Porto.

They won the Campeonato Amapaense five times.

== History ==
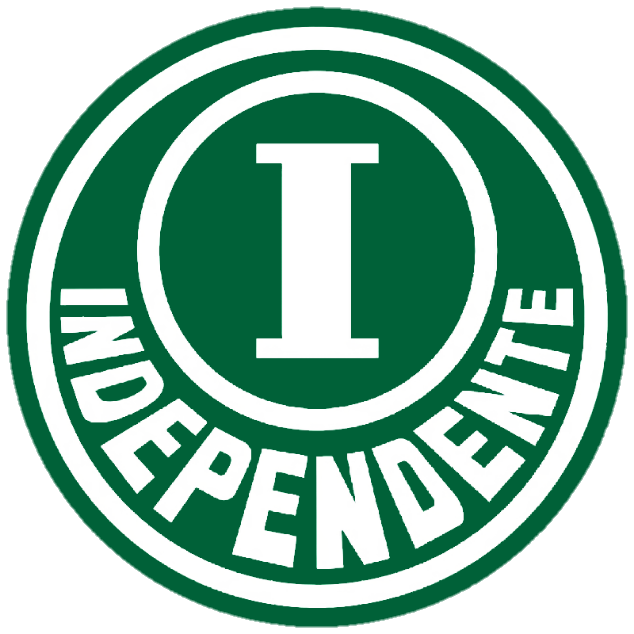
Logo used until 2024

The club was founded on 19 January 1962. They won the Campeonato Amapaense in 1982, 1983, 1989, 1995, and in 2001.

== Stadium ==
Independente Esporte Clube play their home games at Estádio Antônio Vilela, nicknamed Vilelão. The stadium has a maximum capacity of 5,000 people.

== Honours ==
=== Regional ===
- Torneio de Integração da Amazônia
  - Winners: 1989
  - Runners-up: 1990

=== State ===
- Campeonato Amapaense
  - Winners (5): 1982, 1983, 1989, 1995, 2001
  - Runners-up (8): 1964, 1965, 1981, 1988, 2002, 2003, 2022, 2023
