= Zerão =

Stadium in Macapá, Brazil

Coordinates: 0°00′02″N 51°04′51″W

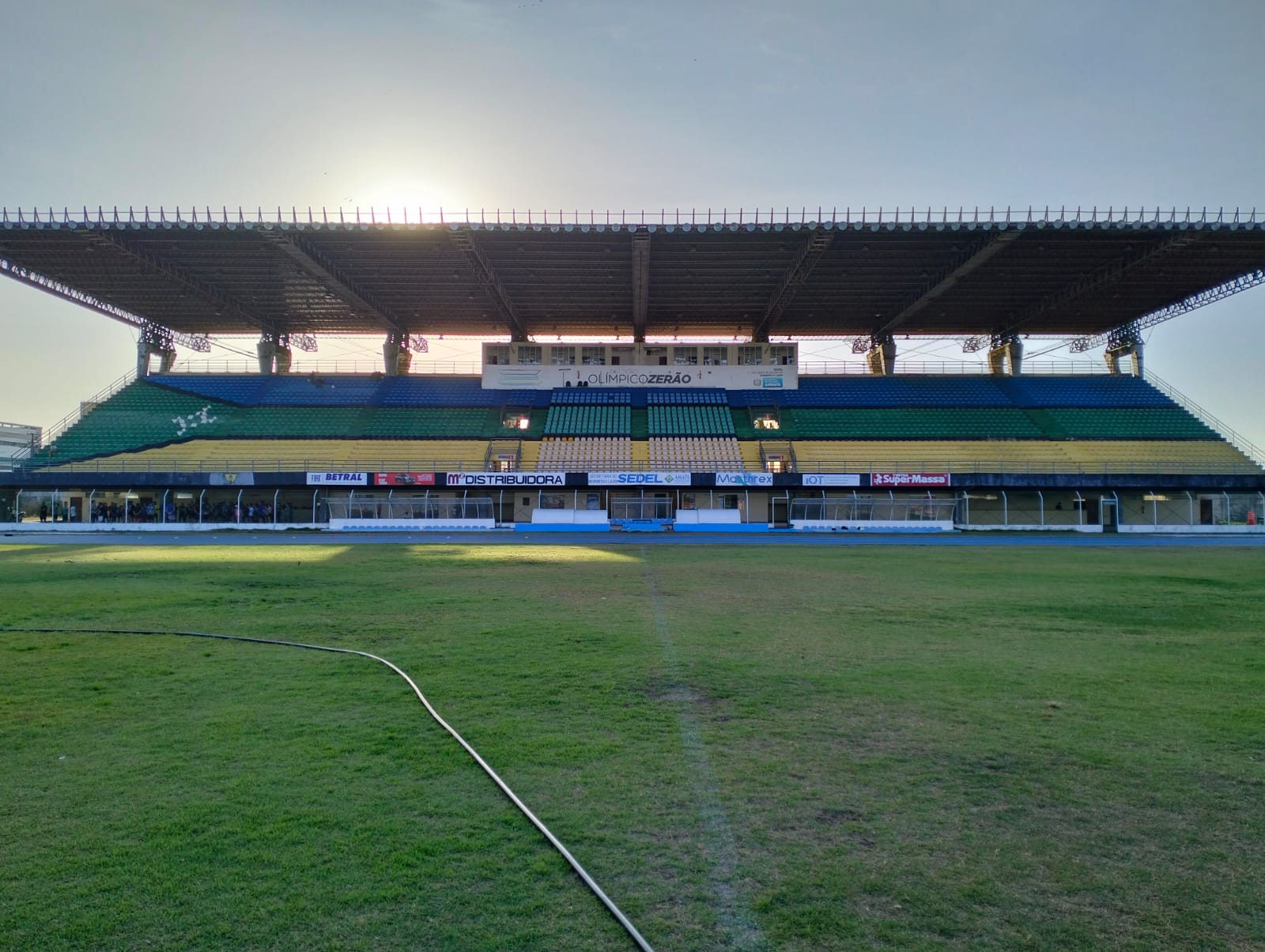
- The Zerão in 2022
- Interactive map of Zerão
- Full name: Estádio Olímpico Milton de Souza Corrêa
- Former names: Estádio Ayrton Senna
- Location: Rua do Estádio Zerão; Jardim Marco Zero; Macapá
- Owner: State of Amapá
- Capacity: 13,680
- Record attendance: 10,000
- Field size: 110x75

Construction
- Built: 1990
- Opened: 17 October 1990; 36 years ago
- Renovated: 2014; 12 years ago

Tenants
- Macapá; Oratório; Trem; Santos-AP; São Paulo-AP

Estádio Olímpico Milton de Souza Corrêa (Brazilian Portuguese pronunciation: [isˈtadʒw oˈlĩpiku ˈmiwtõ dʒi ˈsowzɐ koˈʁejɐ]), commonly known as Zerão [zɛˈɾɐ̃w], is a multi-purpose stadium located in Macapá, Brazil. It is used mostly for football matches and hosts the home matches of Esporte Clube Macapá, Oratório Recreativo Clube, Trem Desportivo Clube, Santos Futebol Clube (AP) and São Paulo Futebol Clube (AP). The stadium has a maximum capacity of 13,680 people and was built in 1990. The name (and the fame) come from the common belief that the midfield line lies exactly on the Equator—zero latitude—thus causing each team to defend one hemisphere.

== Overview ==
The stadium has a maximum capacity of 10,000 people and was built in 1990. The name (and the fame) came from the circumstance that the stadium lies on the Equator, zero latitude, and the midfield line is aligned with the nearby Marco Zero Monument.

Zerão is owned by the Amapá State Government. The stadium is named after Milton de Souza Corrêa, who was a former president of the Amapá State Football Federation. The stadium is nicknamed after the neighborhood where it is located, Marco Zero (the neighborhood is named Marco Zero—"mark 0" in English—as it is located on the Equator). Zerão means Big Zero, denoting the zeroth latitude, the Equator.

== History ==
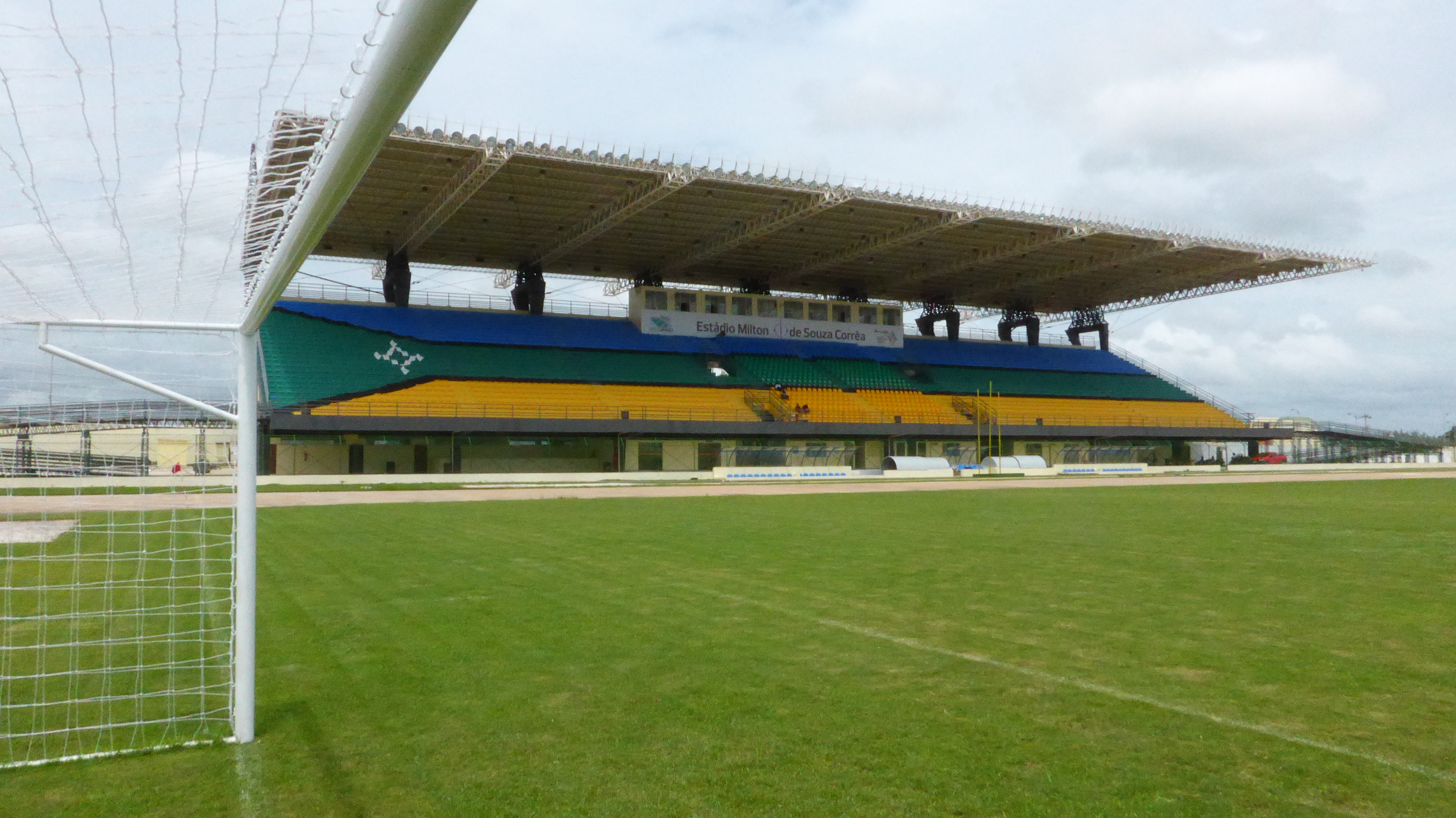
Estádio Milton Corrêa in 2014

In 1990, the work on Zerão was completed. It was named Estádio Ayrton Senna, after the Formula 1 driver. The inaugural match was played on 17 October of that year, when Independente beat Trem 1–0. The first goal of the stadium was scored by Independente's Mirandinha. The stadium's attendance record currently stands at 10,000, set on that match.

In 1994, after Milton de Souza Corrêa's death, the stadium was renamed to its current name, Estádio Milton Corrêa.

The Zerão closed in 2007, and after seven years of remodeling, the stadium reopened in 2014.
