= São Paulo Futebol Clube (AP) =

Football club in Macapá, Brazil

São Paulo-AP
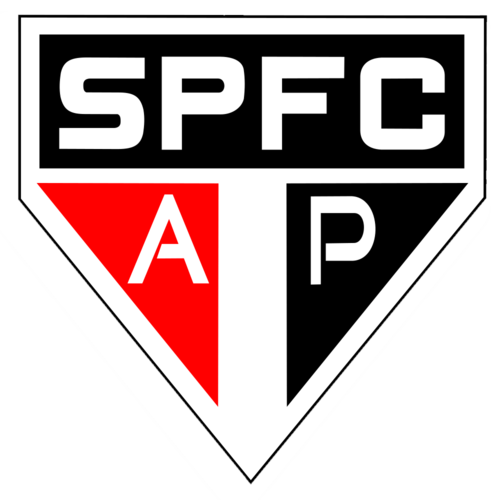
- Full name: São Paulo Futebol Clube
- Nickname(s): Tricolor do São Lázaro
- Founded: 3 February 1988; 37 years ago
- Ground: Zerão
- Capacity: 13,680
- President: Adênus Gameleira
- Head Coach: Arlem Oliveira
- League: Campeonato Amapaense Segunda Divisão
- 2024: Amapaense, 8th of 8 (relegated)
Home colours	Away colours	colours

São Paulo Futebol Clube, also known as São Paulo-AP (Brazilian Portuguese: [ˈsɐ͂wpawlu ˈdo amaˈpa]), or simply São Paulo, is a Brazilian football club based in Macapá, Amapá. The team competes in the Campeonato Amapaense, the top division in the Amapá state football league system.

== History ==
The club was founded on 3 February 1988, adopting similar colors, team kits and logo as São Paulo Futebol Clube of São Paulo state.

== Stadium ==
Like other clubs in the state, São Paulo does not have its own stadium. Since 2017, all football matches in Amapá are held at Zerão. Up until 2014, the team also played at Glicerão, which is currently undergoing renovation.

== Honours ==
- Campeonato Amapaense
  - Runners-up (1): 2014
