= Santos Futebol Clube (AP) =

Football club in Macapá, Brazil

Santos-AP
- Full name: Santos Futebol Clube
- Nickname: Peixe da Amazônia (Amazon Fish)
- Founded: 11 May 1973; 53 years ago
- Ground: Zerão
- Capacity: 13,680
- President: Luciano Marba
- Head coach: Beto Acosta
- League: Campeonato Amapaense
- 2025: Amapaense, 4th of 8
- Website: http://santosmacapa.com.br/site/home/
Home colors	Away colors

Santos Futebol Clube, also known as Santos-AP (Brazilian Portuguese: [ˈsɐ͂tuz ˈdo amaˈpa]) or simply Santos, is a Brazilian professional football club based in Macapá, Amapá. The team competes in the Campeonato Amapaense, the top division in the Amapá state football league system. (Note: As of this season, Santos' last national league appearance was in the 2020 Campeonato Brasileiro Série D.) Founded in 1973, they are located in the bairro of Coração and play their home matches at the state-owned Zerão.

They are the fourth most successful club in Amapá (alongside Trem and Santana) in terms of league trophies won, with seven Amapazão titles. Santos has also won the Amapaense Second Division once, in 2007. The club reached the Amapaense finals in seven consecutive seasons between 2013 and 2019, taking the title six times during that period.

Santos is the top-ranked team from Amapá in CBF's national club ranking, being placed 100th overall.

== History ==
In Amapá, precisely in 1973, Otávio Nogueira and Delson Furtado, mobilized a group of friends to found the Santos Futebol Clube in Macapá. The historic meeting took place exactly on 11 May 1973.

== Stadium ==
Like other clubs in the state, Santos does not have its own stadium. Since 2017, all football matches in Amapá are held at Zerão. Up until 2014, the team also played at Glicerão, which is currently undergoing renovation.

== Rivalries ==
Santos rivals are Oratório and Trem.

== Honours ==
=== State ===
- Campeonato Amapaense
  - Winners (8): 2000, 2013, 2014, 2015, 2016, 2017, 2019, 2026
  - Runners-up (3): 2011, 2018, 2021
- Campeonato Amapaense Segunda Divisão
  - Winners (1): 2007
