= Campeonato Amapaense =

Football league in Amapá, Brazil

- Organising body: FAF
- Founded: 1944; 82 years ago (as different amateur leagues); 1991; 35 years ago (as the professional Campeonato Amapaense)
- Country: Brazil
- State: Amapá
- Level on pyramid: 1
- Relegation to: Campeonato Amapaense Second Division
- Domestic cup(s): Copa Verde; Copa do Brasil
- Current champions: Santos (8th title) (2026)
- Most championships: Macapá (17 titles)
- Website: FAF Official website

The Campeonato Amapaense, commonly known simply as Amapazão, or Amapazão Sicredi for sponsorship reasons, is the top-flight professional state football league in the Brazilian state of Amapá. It is run by the Amapá Football Federation (FAF).

== List of champions ==
Following is the list with all state champions of Amapá:

=== Amateur era ===
Season	Champions
1944	Panair (1)
1945	Amapá (1)
1946	Macapá (2)
1947	Macapá (3)
1948	Macapá (4)
1949	Macapá (5)
1950	Amapá (2)
1951	Amapá (3)
1952	Trem (1)
1953	Amapá (4)
1954	Macapá (6)
1955	Macapá (7)
1956	Macapá (8)
1957	Macapá (9)
1958	Macapá (10)
1959	Macapá (11)
1960	Santana (1)
1961	Santana (2)
1962	Santana (3)
1963	CEA (1)
1964	Juventus (1)
1965	Santana (4)
1966	Juventus (2)
1967	Juventus (3)
1968	Santana (5)
1969	Macapá (12)
1970	São José (1)
1971	São José (2)
1972	Santana (6)
1972	São José (3)
1973	Amapá (5)
1974	Macapá (13)
1975	Amapá (6)
1976	Ypiranga (1)
1977	Guarany (1)
1978	Macapá (14)
1979	Amapá (7)
1980	Macapá (15)
1981	Macapá (16)
1982	Independente (1)
1983	Independente (2)
1984	Trem (2)
1985	Santana (7)
1986	Amapá (8)
1987	Amapá (9)
1988	Amapá (10)
1989	Independente (3)
1990	Amapá (11)

Names change

1. Panair is the currently EC Macapá.

=== Professional era ===
Season	Champions	Runners-up
1991	Macapá (17)	Amapá
1992	Ypiranga (2)	Trem
1993	São José (4)	Amapá
1994	Ypiranga (3)	Macapá
1995	Independente (4)	Cristal
1996	Not held	
1997	Ypiranga (4)	São José
1998	Aliança (1)	Amapá
1999	Ypiranga (5)	Aliança
2000	Santos (1)	Mazagão
2001	Independente (5)	São José
2002	Ypiranga (6)	Independente
2003	Ypiranga (7)	Independente
2004	Ypiranga (8)	São José
2005	São José (5)	Amapá
2006	São José (6)	Amapá
2007	Trem (3)	Cristal
2008	Cristal (1)	São José
2009	São José (7)	Santana
2010	Trem (4)	Santana
2011	Trem (5)	Santos
2012	Oratório (1)	Ypiranga
2013	Santos (2)	Macapá
2014	Santos (3)	São Paulo
2015	Santos (4)	Trem
2016	Santos (5)	Trem
2017	Santos (6)	Macapá
2018	Ypiranga (9)	Santos
2019	Santos (7)	Ypiranga
2020	Ypiranga (10)	Santana
2021	Trem (6)	Santos
2022	Trem (7)	Independente
2023	Trem (8)	Independente
2024	Trem (9)	Oratório
2025	Trem (10)	Oratório
2026	Santos (8)	São José

== Titles by team ==
Teams in bold stills active.

Rank	Club	Winners	Winning years
1	**Macapá**	17	1944, 1946, 1947, 1948, 1954, 1955, 1956, 1957, 1958, 1959, 1969, 1974, 1978, 1980, 1981, 1986, 1991
2	Amapá	11	1945, 1950, 1951, 1953, 1973, 1975, 1979, 1986, 1987, 1988, 1990
3	**Trem**	10	1952, 1984, 2007, 2010, 2011, 2021, 2022, 2023, 2024, 2025
3	**Ypiranga**	10	1976, 1992, 1994, 1997, 1999, 2002, 2003, 2004, 2018, 2020
5	**Santos**	8	2000, 2013, 2014, 2015, 2016, 2017, 2019, 2026
6	**Santana**	7	1960, 1961, 1962, 1965, 1968, 1972 (shared), 1985
6	**São José**	7	1970, 1971, 1972 (shared), 1993, 2005, 2006, 2009
8	**Independente**	5	1982, 1983, 1989, 1995, 2001
9	**Juventus**	3	1964, 1966, 1967
10	**Aliança**	1	1998
10	**CEA**	1	1963
10	**Cristal**	1	2008
10	**Guarany**	1	1977
10	**Oratório**	1	2012

=== By city ===
City	Championships	Clubs
Macapá	70	Macapá (17), Amapá (11), Ypiranga (10), Trem (10), Santos (8), São José (7), Juventus (3), CEA (1), Cristal (1), Guarany (1), Oratório (1)
Santana	13	Santana (7), Independente (5), Aliança (1)
