= Esporte Clube Macapá =

Football club in Macapá, Brazil

Macapá
- Full name: Esporte Clube Macapá
- Nickname: Leão da FAB (Lion of the FAB)
- Founded: 7 September 1941; 85 years ago
- Ground: Zerão
- Capacity: 13,680
- Head coach: Miguel Seruca
- League: Campeonato Amapaense
- 2025: Amapaense Segunda Divisão, 1st of 11 (champions)
Home colours	Away colours

Esporte Clube Macapá, commonly referred to as Macapá (Brazilian Portuguese: [makaˈpa]), is a Brazilian football club based in Macapá, Amapá. The team competes in the Campeonato Amapaense, the top division in the Amapá state football league system. (Note: As of this season, Macapá's last national league appearance was in the 2018 Campeonato Brasileiro Série D.)

It was founded on 7 September 1941. Macapá had a historic rivalry with Amapá Clube, with whom they played the Clássico Vovô.

As of 2022, Macapá is the third-best ranked team from Amapá in CBF's national club ranking, being placed 205th overall.

== History ==
On July 18, 1944, the club was founded as Panair Esporte Clube, by Emanuel de Souza.

In 1946, the club was renamed to its current name, Esporte Clube Macapá.

In 1992, Macapá disputed the Campeonato Brasileiro Série C. The club was eliminated in the first stage, finishing in the third position (out of five clubs) of its group.

== Honours ==
=== Regional ===
- Copão da Amazônia
  - Winners (1): 1975

=== State ===
- Campeonato Amapaense
  - Winners (17): 1944, 1946, 1947, 1948, 1954, 1955, 1956, 1957, 1958, 1959, 1969, 1974, 1978, 1980, 1981, 1986, 1991
- Campeonato Amapaense Segunda Divisão
  - Winners (2): 1989, 2025

== Stadium ==
Like other clubs in the state, Macapá does not have its own stadium. Since 2017, all football matches in Amapá are held at Zerão. Up until 2014, the team also played at Glicerão, which is currently undergoing renovation.

== Home kit ==
Esporte Clube Macapá's home kit is a blue shirt, with white shorts and white socks.

== Logo ==
Macapá's logo inspiration is the Brazilian flag. It is a blue circle, with five white stars of different sizes and a curved white band running through it. The club's name E.C. Macapá is inscribed in capital letters in blue inside the band.
