= State football leagues in Brazil =

System of regionalized association football competitions

State football leagues
- Founded: 1902
- Country: Brazil
- Confederation: CBF
- Number of clubs: Varies by state
- Level on pyramid: 5–9
- Promotion to: Copa do Nordeste (northeast); Copa Verde (north, center-west and Espírito Santo); Copa do Brasil; Série D
- Relegation to: Several state divisions

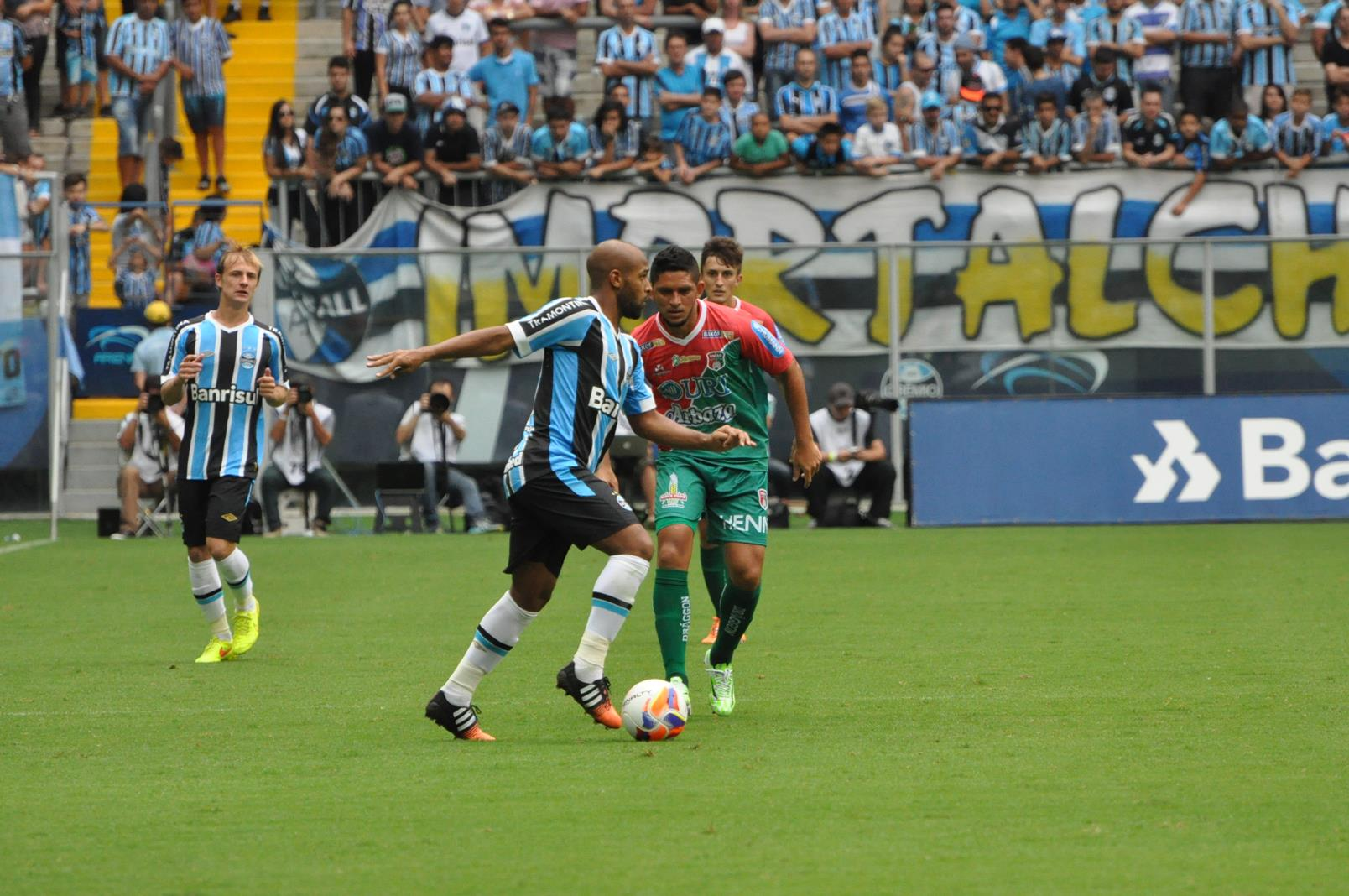
Grêmio vs. União Frederiquense for 2015 Campeonato Gaúcho

The Brazilian states football championships (Portuguese: Campeonatos Estaduais or simply Estaduais) are the professional adult male football competitions in Brazil that take place between January and April for the Northeast, Central-West, Southeast and South regions. In some states from the North Region, however, it takes place in May or June. One such league, the Campeonato Paulista, which started in 1902, is the oldest football competition in Brazil. All professional football clubs in Brazil play in a state championship, but not all qualify for the national league.

The state championships were the first professional competitions formed in Brazil; due to economic and geographic reasons, and especially long distances between the country's main cities and different states, each of the federative units of Brazil created their own football championship. As such, state leagues were the main competition and even after the creation of a proper national championship in 1971 the state leagues remained prestigious and important for Brazilian fans up to the 1980s and 1990s, when national and continental competitions surpassed them in terms of relevance. Before the 1989 Campeonato Brasileiro, clubs qualified to the national league through their performances at their state's league. The 1963 Campeonato Carioca final, a Fla–Flu at the Maracanã, holds the world record for attendance at a club match: 194,603 spectators.

The state championships run as a parallel league to the main Brazilian Championships. Clubs compete in both Brazilian and state championships simultaneously, and each state league has its own format and divisions with promotion and relegation. Good standings in the tables qualify teams for the following year's Copa do Brasil, regional tournaments Copa do Nordeste and Copa Verde, while teams without a national division qualify for the following year's Campeonato Brasileiro Série D.

== Overview ==
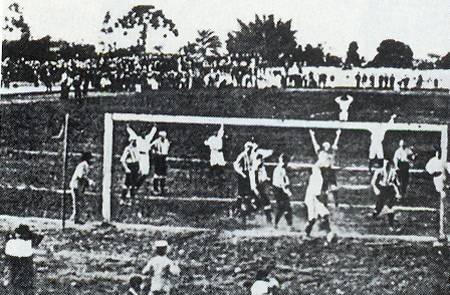
São Paulo Athletic Club and CA Paulistano in the final of the first São Paulo State Championship in 1902

Historically, for economic and geographic reasons, such as long distances between the country's main cities, the state leagues were considered the most important championship for Brazilian clubs, especially before 1959, when a regular national championship (Taça Brasil) was first established. In recent years, bigger clubs have become increasingly critical of the state leagues, which are often blamed for the lack of space in Brazil's football calendar and have lost most of its old prestige. Smaller clubs, however, are dependent on the state leagues for their financial well-being and largely oppose calls to reduce the number of games or even end state leagues altogether.

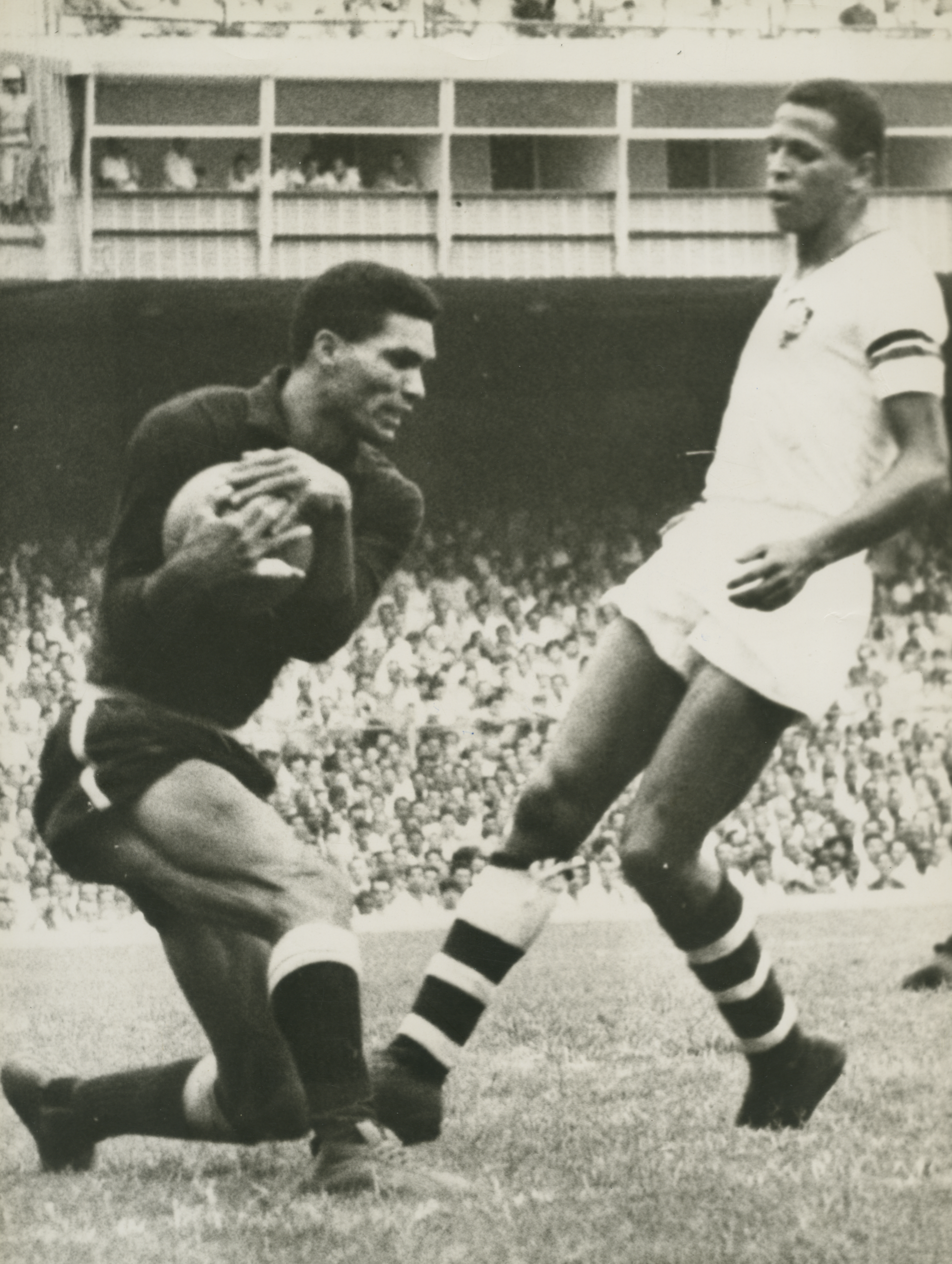
Match between Botafogo and Fluminese (a derby known as Clássico Vovô) for the Campeonato Carioca

Because of these championships, some disputes between rivals from the same state or city have the same weight or greater than a dispute with the main clubs in other states. These games are called derbies. Some examples are the Fla-Flu and the Clássico dos Milhões, in Rio de Janeiro; Paulista Derby, Choque Rei, Majestoso and San-São, in São Paulo; Grenal, in Rio Grande do Sul; the Clássico Mineiro, in Minas Gerais; Atle-tiba, in Paraná; the Clássico dos Clássicos and Clássico das Multidões, in Pernambuco; the Ba-Vi, in Bahia; the Clássico de Florianópolis and the Clássico do Interior, in Santa Catarina; Clássico-Rei, in Ceará, between Ceará and Fortaleza, and in Rio Grande do Norte between ABC and América de Natal; the Re-Pa, in Pará; Clássico das Multidões in Alagoas; the Super Clássico, in Maranhão; Rivengo, in Piauí; the Clássico dos Maiorais, in Paraíba; Derby Sergipano, in Sergipe; the Derby do Cerrado, in Goiás; the Rio-Nal, in Amazonas; the Clássico dos Gigantes, in Espírito Santo; between others.

State champions and runners-up, and in some states, the highest placed on the state championship table, are automatically qualified to play in the next year's Copa do Brasil. In addition, the highest ranked clubs in each state that do not compete in the Brazilian Championship Serie A, Serie B or Serie C qualify for next year's Serie D. Finally, the best teams in each state league can also qualify for regional cups such as the Copa do Nordeste (for Northeastern clubs) and Copa Verde (for clubs from North and Center-West regions). To prepare for the State Championship, divisionless clubs, lacking a full-year calendar, play training games and some choose to face Municipal Selections in different regions.

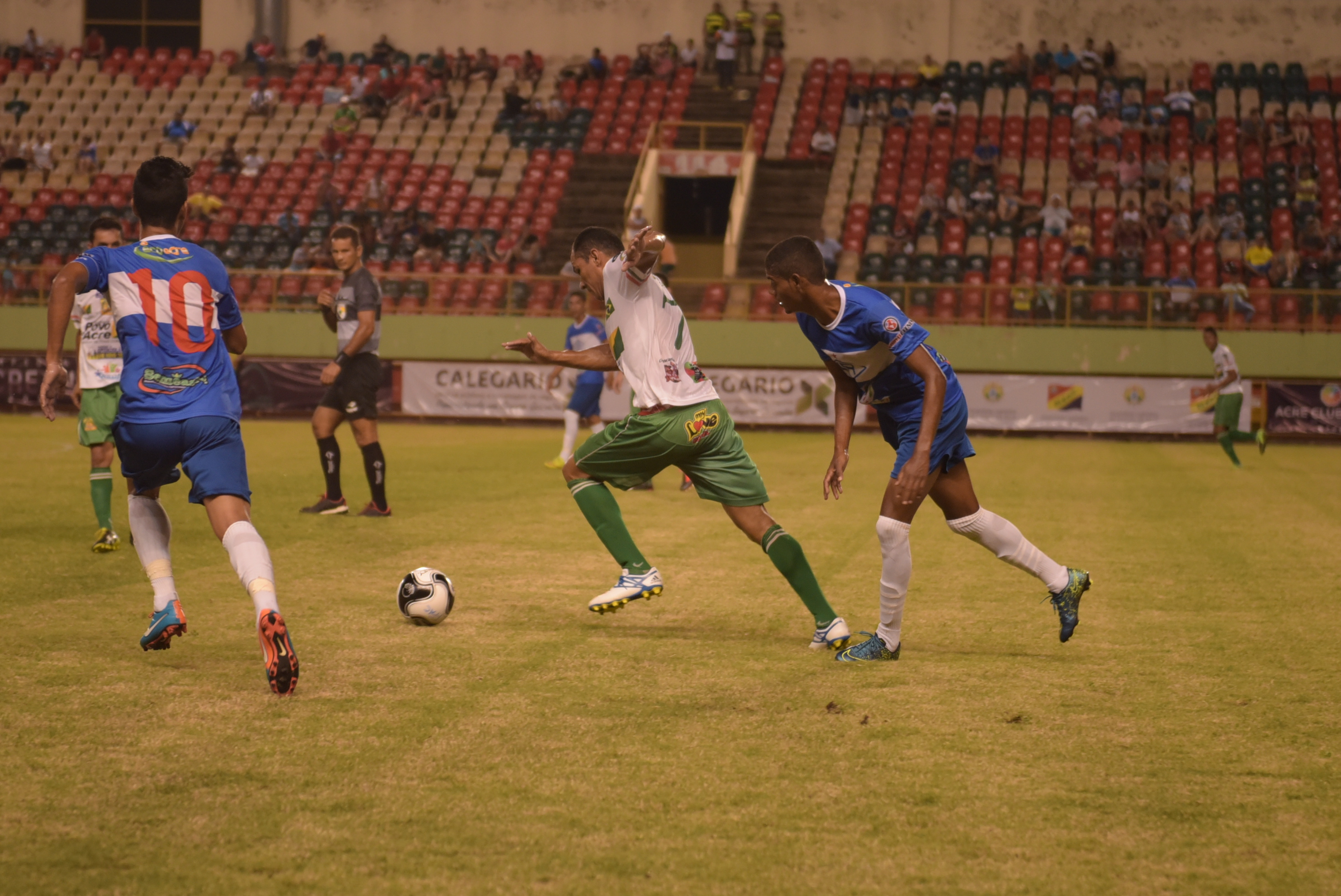
Campeonato Acreano (for the state of Acre) between Atlético Acreano and Alto Acre, 2015

The only state championship that does not use the official gentilic of those born in the state is the one in Rio de Janeiro, since, popularly, the tournament is called Campeonato Carioca (Carioca is the official gentilic of the municipality of Rio de Janeiro), instead of Campeonato Fluminense. This occurs for three reasons: the first because of tradition, since the big clubs in the state, when Rio de Janeiro was still the capital of Brazil, disputed the Campeonato Carioca and not the Campeonato Fluminense; the second because popular and culturally Carioca is the gentilic by which its inhabitants are usually known outside the state of Rio de Janeiro, and the third because there is a traditional club in the state called Fluminense, which could generate complaints from rivals if the championship were so called. Because of this, the Rio state football championship is officially called the Campeonato Estadual do Rio de Janeiro

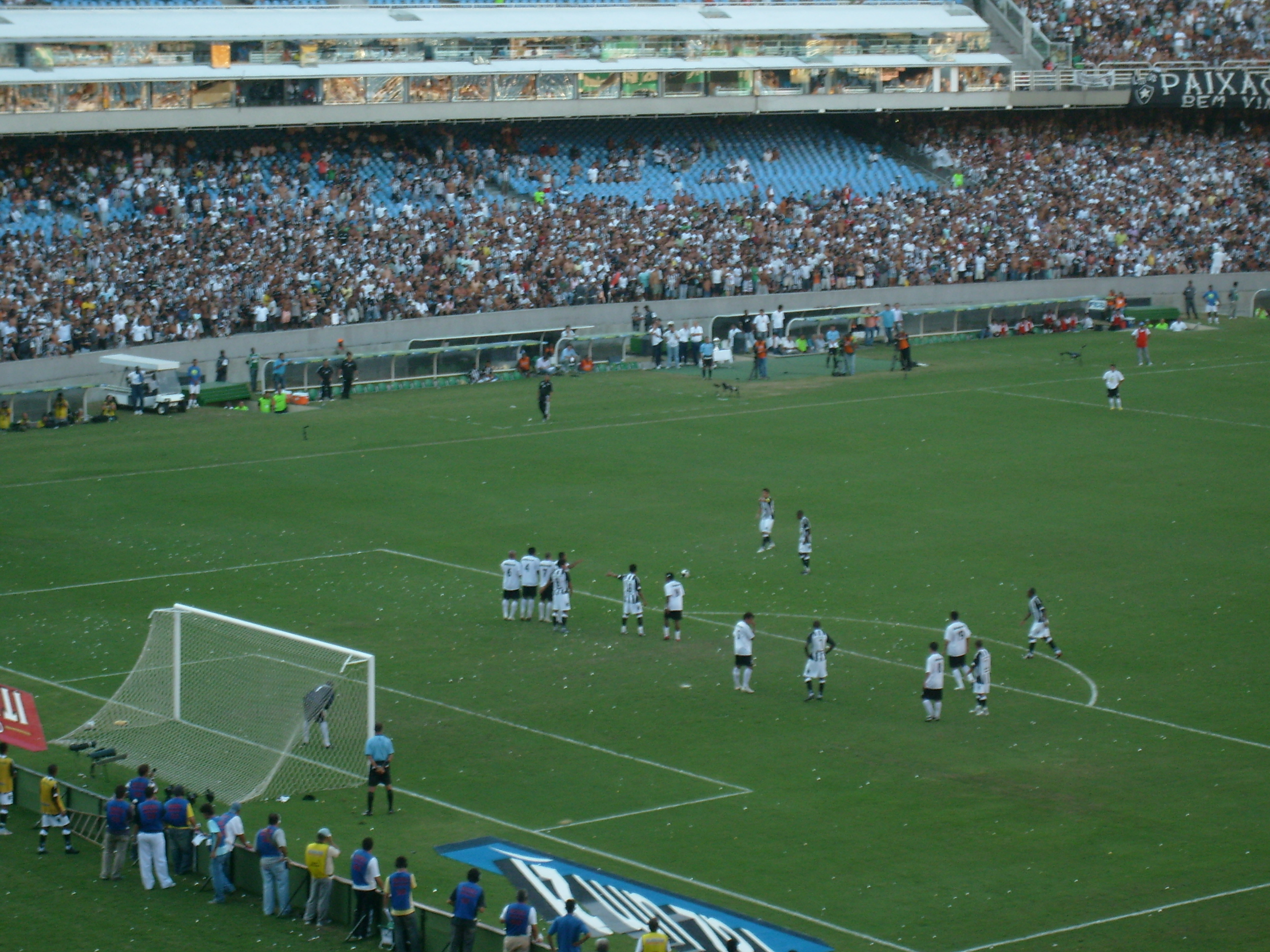
Match for the Carioca Championship between Botafogo from the city of Rio de Janeiro and Resende Futebol Clube from the city of Resende, in the interior of the state of Rio de Janeiro. Unlike other states, the Carioca Championship uses the city's gentilic and not the state's

The club with the most state champions in Brazil is ABC, with 57 titles from Campeonato Potiguar, which gives it the world record for the most titles in the same competition. This team also holds the record for straight titles, ten (between 1932 and 1941), alongside América Mineiro (which won the Campeonato Mineiro successively between 1916 and 1925). Bahia is the second biggest champion and Paysandu, the third.

The players most often champions are the left midfielder Quarentinha, with 12 titles, all for Paysandu, between the 1950s and the 1970s, being the one with the most triumphs in a single state and by the same club; defender Durval, who in 2017 also won his 12th state title, in 5 FUs (each for a single team), among trophies accumulated since 2003 between the Campeonato Paraibano, Brasiliense, Paranaense, Pernambucano (6) and Paulista (3) championships; the midfielder Givanildo Oliveira, winner of 10 Pernambucanos, as well as a Paulista and a Carioca; and Jorge Henrique, who is perhaps the player who won in more states, as he was champion 12 times by 8 teams in 8 FUs (CE, DF, PE (3), PR, RJ, RS (2), SC and SP (2). As a coach, the same Givanildo won 18 state teams for 10 teams in 6 FUs, an absolute record: 7 Paraenses, 5 Pernambucanos, 2 Cearenses, 2 Alagoanos, 1 Baiano and 1 Mineiro. This adds up to 30 state commemorations for Givanildo, an isolated record holder. Another big winner is Vanderlei Luxemburgo, who won 14 times for 9 teams in 5 FUs (9 Paulistas, 2 Mineiros, 1 Carioca, 1 Capixaba and 1 Pernambucano) as a coach (already having three achievements as a player: 3 Cariocas), having nine titles this century, being tied at the top of this stat with Givanildo, who in turn is also the statewide winner for more different teams in the 21st century (8).

== List of state football leagues in Brazil ==

Federal unit	Championship	2026 Champion	Most Championships
(Acre (state)) Acre	Campeonato Acreano	Santa Cruz (1st)	Rio Branco (49)
Alagoas	Campeonato Alagoano	CRB (36th)	CSA (40)
Amapá	Campeonato Amapaense	Santos (8th)	Macapá (17)
(Amazonas (Brazilian state)) Amazonas	Campeonato Amazonense	Nacional (44th)	Nacional (44)
Bahia	Campeonato Baiano	Bahia (52nd)	Bahia (52)
Ceará	Campeonato Cearense	Fortaleza (47th)	Ceará and Fortaleza (47)
(Federal District (Brazil)) Distrito Federal	Campeonato Brasiliense	Gama (15th)	Gama (15)
Espírito Santo	Campeonato Capixaba	Porto Vitória (1st)	Rio Branco (39)
Goiás	Campeonato Goiano	Goiás (29th)	Goiás (29)
Maranhão	Campeonato Maranhense	IAPE (1st)	Sampaio Corrêa (37)
Mato Grosso	Campeonato Mato-Grossense	Mixto (25th)	Mixto (25)
Mato Grosso do Sul	Campeonato Sul-Mato-Grossense	Operário (15th)	Operário (15)
Minas Gerais	Campeonato Mineiro	Cruzeiro (39th)	Atlético Mineiro (50)
Pará	Campeonato Paraense	Paysandu (51st)	Paysandu (51)
Paraíba	Campeonato Paraibano	Botafogo (31st)	Botafogo (31)
(Paraná (state)) Paraná	Campeonato Paranaense	Operário Ferroviário (3rd)	Coritiba (39)
Pernambuco	Campeonato Pernambucano	Sport Recife (46th)	Sport Recife (46)
Piauí	Campeonato Piauiense	Piauí (7th)	Ríver (32)
(Rio de Janeiro (state)) Rio de Janeiro	Campeonato Carioca	Flamengo (40th)	Flamengo (40)
Rio Grande do Norte	Campeonato Potiguar	América (40th)	ABC (57)
Rio Grande do Sul	Campeonato Gaúcho	Grêmio (44th)	Internacional (46)
Rondônia	Campeonato Rondoniense	Guaporé (1st)	Ferroviário (17)
Roraima	Campeonato Roraimense	GAS (3rd)	Baré (26)
(Santa Catarina (state)) Santa Catarina	Campeonato Catarinense	Barra (1st)	Avaí (19)
(São Paulo (state)) São Paulo	Campeonato Paulista	Palmeiras (27th)	Corinthians (31)
Sergipe	Campeonato Sergipano	Sergipe (38th)	Sergipe (38)
Tocantins	Campeonato Tocantinense	Tocantinópolis (8th)	Palmas and Tocantinópolis (8)

== From amateurism to professionalism ==
Federal unit	Amateur era		Professional era	
Federal unit	Championship	Organising body	Championship	Organising body
(Acre (state)) Acre	Campeonato Acreano (1919)	LRF / LAET / FAD / FFA (Note: The current Federação de Futebol do Acre (Acre Football Federation) originated as the Liga Riobranquense de Futebol, later renamed the Liga Acreana de Sports Terrestres in 1921, the Federação Acreana de Desportos in 1941, the Federação de Futebol do Estado do Acre in 1987, and finally adopted its current name in 1999.)	Campeonato Acreano (1989)	FFA
Alagoas	Campeonato Alagoano (1927)	CEA / FAD / FAF (Note: The current Federação Alagoana de Futebol (Alagoas Football Federation) originated as the Coligação Esportiva de Alagoas, later renamed the Federação Alagoana de Desportos in 1934, and finally adopted its current name in 1999.)	Campeonato Alagoano (unknown)	FAF
Amapá	Campeonato Amapaense (1944)	FAD / FDA / FAF (Note: The current Federação Amapaense de Futebol (Amapá Football Federation) originated as the Federação de Desportos do Amapá in 1945, later renamed the Federação Amapaense de Desportos in 1977, and finally adopted its current name.)	Campeonato Amapaense (1991)	FAF
(Amazonas (Brazilian state)) Amazonas	Campeonato Amazonense (1914)	LAF / LASA / FADA / FAF (Note: The current Federação Amazonense de Futebol (Amazonas Football Federation) originated as the Liga Amazonense de Foot-ball, later renamed the Liga Amazonense de Sport Athléticos in 1916, the Federação Amazonense de Desportos Atléticos in 1917, and finally adopted its current name in 1960.)	Campeonato Amazonense (1965)	FAF
Bahia	Campeonato Baiano (1905)	LBST, LBDT, FBDT (Note: The current Federação Bahiana de Futebol (Bahia Football Federation) originated from clubs belonging to two distinct leagues. One was the Liga Bahiana dos Sports Terrestres, which existed from 1904 to 1912 and was characterized by a more elitist and exclusive nature. The other was the Liga Brasileira de Desportos Terrestres, active from 1913 to 1919, which had a more popular character and was pejoratively known as the "Liga dos Pretinhos" ("Darkies League"). The merger of these two leagues led to the creation of the Liga Bahiana de Desportos Terrestres in 1920. It was later renamed the Federação Bahiana de Desportos Terrestres in 1941, before finally adopting its current name, the Federação Bahiana de Futebol.)	Campeonato Baiano (unknown)	FBDT / FBF
Ceará	Campeonato Cearense (1915)	LMC or ADC (Note: The first football league in Ceará was the Liga Metropolitana Cearense de Foot-ball, which existed between 1915 and 1919. The following year, in 1920, a new league was founded, the Associação Desportiva Cearense, which was renamed the Federação Cearense de Desportos in 1941 and, finally, adopted its current name, the Federação Cearense de Futebol (Ceará Football Federation), in 1972.)	Campeonato Cearense (1939)	FCD / FCF
(Federal District (Brazil)) Distrito Federal	Campeonato Brasiliense (1959)	FDB / FMF (Note: The current Federação de Futebol do Distrito Federal (Federal District Football Federation) was founded as the Federação Desportiva de Brasília in 1959. It was later renamed the Federação Metropolitana de Futebol in 1971, the Federação Brasiliense de Futebol in 2004, and finally adopted its current name in 2015.)	Campeonato Brasiliense (1976)	FMF / FBF / FFDF
Espírito Santo	Taça Cidade de Vitória (1917)	LSE / FDE (Note: The current Federação de Futebol do Estado do Espírito Santo (Espírito Santo Football Federation) originated as the Liga Sportiva Espírito Santense in 1917, later renamed the Federação Desportiva Espírito-Santense in 1938, and finally adopted its current name in 1984.)	Campeonato Capixaba (mid-1930s)	FDE / FES
Goiás	Campeonato Goiano (1944)	FGF (Note: The current Federação Goiana de Futebol (Goiás Football Federation) was founded as the Associação Goiana de Esportes in 1939 and adopted its current name in 1941.)	Campeonato Goiano (1962)	FGF
Maranhão	Campeonato Maranhense (1918)	LMS / AMEA / FMD / FMF (Note: The current Federação Maranhense de Futebol (Maranhão Football Federation) originated as the Liga Maranhense de Sports in 1918, later renamed the Associação Maranhense de Esportes Atléticos in 1938, the Federação Maranhense de Desportos in 1941, and finally adopted its current name in 1994.)	Campeonato Maranhense (unknown)	FMF
Mato Grosso	Campeonato Mato-Grossense (1936)	FMD / FMF (Note: The current Federação Matogrossense de Futebol (Mato Grosso Football Federation) was founded as the Federação Matogrossense de Desportos in 1942 and adopted its current name in 1979.)	Campeonato Mato-Grossense (1967)	FMD / FMF
Mato Grosso do Sul	none		Campeonato Sul-Mato-Grossense (1979)	FFMS
Minas Gerais	Campeonato de Belo Horizonte (1915)	LMSA / LMDT, AMET or AMEG (Note: Organized by different rival bodies. The first was the Liga Mineira de Sports Athleticos, founded in 1915 and later renamed the Liga Mineira de Desportos Terrestres (LMDT) in 1918. A dissident entity, the Associação Mineira de Esportes Terrestres, emerged and organized only a parallel championship in 1926. Another dissident entity, the Associação Mineira de Esportes Geraes (AMEG), was established in 1932, comprising the strongest clubs in Belo Horizonte at the time. Shortly afterward, the LMDT and AMEG merged to form the Associação Mineira de Esportes in 1933, which institutionalized professionalism in Minas Gerais football that same season.)	Campeonato Mineiro (1933)	AME / FAMAF / FMF (Note: The Associação Mineira de Esportes merged with the Federação das Associações Mineiras de Athletismo to form the Federação das Associações Mineiras de Athletismo e Futebol in 1937. The entity was renamed the Federação Mineira de Futebol (Minas Gerais Football Federation) in 1939.)
Pará	Campeonato Paraense (1908)	NFA or LPF / LPET / FPD / LAP / APF / FPD (Note: The first entity to organize official championships in Pará was the Nacional FootBall Association, founded in 1908. A new entity, the Liga Paraense de Foot-Ball, was created in 1913 to continuously organize local football championships. It was renamed the Liga Paraense de Esportes Terrestres in 1917, the Federação Paraense de Desporto in 1928, the Liga Atlética Paraense in 1933, the Associação Paraense de Futebol in 1938, the Federação Paraense de Desportos again in 1941, and finally adopted its current name, the Federação Paraense de Futebol (Pará Football Federation), in 1970.)	Campeonato Paraense (1945)	FPD / FPF
Paraíba	Campeonato Paraibano (1908)	LPF or LDP / FDP / FPF (Note: The first football entity in Paraíba was the Liga Parahybana de Football, founded in 1908 and dissolved in 1918. A new entity, the Liga Desportiva Paraibana, emerged in 1919 and was later renamed the Federação Desportiva Paraibana in 1941, before adopting its current name, the Federação Paraibana de Futebol (Paraíba Football Federation), in 1947.)	Campeonato Paraibano (1960)	FPF
(Paraná (state)) Paraná	Campeonato Paranaense (1915)	LSP, APSA or FPD / LCF / FPF (Note: The current Federação Paranaense de Futebol (Paraná Football Federation) originated from the merger of two distinct leagues – the Liga Sportiva Paranaense (founded in 1915) and the Associação Paranaense de Sports Athléticos (created in 1916) – which led to the establishment of the Associação Sportiva Paranaense in 1916. It was later renamed the Federação Paranaense de Desportos (FPD) in 1926. The FPD delegated the administration of football in the capital, Curitiba, to the Liga Curitibana de Futebol (LCF), while the Federação Paranaense de Futebol (FPF) took charge of football in the rest of the state in 1937. The LCF was dissolved in the 1941 season, and the FPF became the primary entity overseeing football in Paraná from that point onward.)	Campeonato Paranaense (unknown)	FPF
Pernambuco	Campeonato Pernambucano (1915)	LSP / LPDT / FPD (Note: The current Federação Pernambucana de Futebol (Pernambuco Football Federation) originated as the Liga Sportiva Pernambucana in 1915, later renamed the Liga Pernambucana de Desportos Terrestres in 1918, the Federação Pernambucana de Desportos in 1931, and finally adopted its current name in 1955.)	Campeonato Pernambucano (1937)	FPD / FPF
Piauí	Campeonato Piauiense (1916)	DPET / LST / LPSA / LPST / LTET (Teresina), LSP / LPET (Parnaíba) or FPF (Note: Several bodies preceded what is now the Federação de Futebol do Piauí (Piauí Football Federation). The state championships were effectively city championships between 1916 and 1940, a time when amateurism prevailed in football. There were independent leagues running separate championships in Teresina (the state capital) and Parnaíba (the state's second-largest city). Teresina's leagues included the Diretório Piauhyense de Esportes Terrestres, Liga Sportiva Theresinense, Liga Piauhyense de Sports Athleticos, Liga Piauhyense de Sports Terrestres, and Liga Teresinense de Esportes Terrestres. Parnaíba's leagues included the Liga Sportiva Parnahybana and Liga Piauiense de Esportes Terrestres. From 1941 onwards, states were allowed to have only one federation, leading to the establishment of the Federação de Futebol do Piauí.)	Campeonato Piauiense (1963)	FFP
(Rio de Janeiro (state)) Rio de Janeiro	Campeonato Metropolitano (1906) (Note: Rio de Janeiro had the status of a Federal District as the capital of Brazil at that time, and its football championship was officially known as the Campeonato Metropolitano until 1959.)	LMF, AFRJ, LMSA / LMDT or AMEA (Note: Organized by different rival bodies: the Liga Metropolitana de Football (1906–1907), the Liga Metropolitana de Sports Athleticos / Liga Metropolitana de Desportos Terrestres (1908–1934), the Associação de Football do Rio de Janeiro (1912), and the Associação Metropolitana de Esportes Athleticos (1924–1934).)	Campeonato Carioca (1933)	LCF, FMD, LFRJ / FMF / FCF or FERJ (Note: Organized by different rival bodies: the Liga Carioca de Football (1933–1936), the Federação Metropolitana de Desportos (1935–1936), and then the Liga de Football do Rio de Janeiro / Federação Metropolitana de Futebol / Federação Carioca de Futebol (1937–1978), and finally adopting its current name, Federação de Futebol do Estado do Rio de Janeiro (Rio de Janeiro Football Federation), in 1978.)
Rio Grande do Norte	Campeonato Potiguar (1918)	LDTRN / FND (Note: Organized by the Liga de Desportos Terrestres do Rio Grande do Norte, later renamed the Federação Norteriograndense de Desportos in 1941, and finally adopting its current name, the Federação Norte-rio-grandense de Futebol (Rio Grande do Norte Football Federation), in 1976.)	Campeonato Potiguar (1950)	FND / FNF
Rio Grande do Sul	Campeonato Gaúcho (1919)	FRGD (Note: Organized by the Federação Rio-Grandense de Desportos, later renamed the Federação Rio-Grandense de Futebol in 1941, and finally adopting its current name, the Federação Gaúcha de Futebol (Rio Grande do Sul Football Federation), in the 1960s.)	Campeonato Gaúcho (1940)	FRGF / FGF
Rondônia	Campeonato Rondoniense (1945)	FDG / FDR (Note: The first sports organization created in what is now the state of Rondônia was the Federação de Desportos do Guaporé, named after the then Territory of Guaporé (until 1956). It was renamed the Federação de Desportos de Rondônia in 1967, and finally adopted its current name, the Federação de Futebol do Estado de Rondônia (Rondônia Football Federation), in the 1980s.)	Campeonato Rondoniense (1991)	FFER
Roraima	Campeonato Roraimense (1946)	FRD (Note: Organized by the Federação Riobranquense de Desportos, later renamed the Federação Roraimense de Desportos in 1962, and finally adopting its current name, the Federação Roraimense de Futebol (Roraima Football Federation), in the 1974.)	Campeonato Roraimense (1995)	FRF
(Santa Catarina (state)) Santa Catarina	Campeonato Catarinense (1924)	LSCDT (Note: Organized by the Liga Santa Catharina de Desportos Terrestres, later renamed the Federação Catarinense de Desportos in 1941, and finally adopting its current name, the Federação Catarinense de Futebol (Santa Catarina Football Federation), in 1951. Until 1927, only clubs from Florianópolis participated in the competition.)	Campeonato Catarinense (unknown)	FCF
(São Paulo (state)) São Paulo	Campeonato Paulista (1902)	LPF, APEA, LAF or FPF (Note: Organized by different rival bodies: the Liga Paulista de Football (1902–1916), the Associação Paulista de Esportes Atléticos (1913–1932), the Liga de Amadores de Football (1926–1929), and the Federação Paulista de Football (1933–1934).)	Campeonato Paulista (1933)	APEA, LPF or LFESP / FPF (Note: Organized by different rival bodies: the Associação Paulista de Esportes Atléticos (1933–1936), the Liga Paulista de Futebol (1935–1936), and finally the Liga de Futebol do Estado de São Paulo in 1937, later called Federação Paulista de Futebol (São Paulo Football Federation) in 1941.)
Sergipe	Campeonato Sergipano (1918)	LDS or LSEA / FSD (Note: Organized by the Liga Desportiva Sergipana until 1926. Afterward, it was organized by the Liga Sergipana de Esportes Atléticos (created in 1927), later renamed the Federação Sergipana de Desportos in 1941, and finally adopting its current name, the Federação Sergipana de Futebol (Sergipe Football Federation), in the 1976.)	Campeonato Sergipano (1960)	FSF
Tocantins	Copa Tocantins (1989) (Note: The current Tocantins Football Championship began as an amateur competition under the name Copa Tocantins.)	FTF	Campeonato Tocantinense (1993)	FTF

== Unrelegated football clubs ==
Championship	Unrelegated teams (min. 10 years)	Continuously in state league for 75 years or more
Acreano	Rio Branco (1919–1921, 1928, 1930, 1935–)	Rio Branco (1935–)
Alagoano	CRB (1927–); ASA (1953–)	CSA (1927–2003)
Amazonense	Nacional (1914–); Princesa do Solimões (1987–1991, 1995–1998, 2001–2002, 2004–)	Nacional (1914–); Fast Clube (1932–2023)
Baiano	Bahia (1931–); Vitória (1920–1929, 1932–1936, 1938–)	Bahia (1931–); Vitória (1938–)
Brasiliense	Gama (1976–); Brasiliense (2001–)	
Capixaba	Real Noroeste (2012–)	
Carioca	Botafogo (1906–); Fluminense (1906–); Flamengo (1912–); Vasco da Gama (1921–)	Botafogo (1906–); Fluminense (1906–); Flamengo (1912–); Vasco da Gama (1921–); America (1908–2008); Bangu (1915–2004)
Cearense	Ceará (1915–); Fortaleza (1918–)	Ceará (1915–); Fortaleza (1918–)
Gaúcho	Grêmio (1919–1926, 1930–1933, 1935, 1946, 1949, 1956–); Juventude (1925, 1940, 1961–1971, 1976–); Internacional (1927, 1934, 1936, 1940–1945, 1947–1948, 1950–1953, 1955, 1961–)	
Goiano	Goiás (1944–)	Goiás (1944–)
Maranhense	Sampaio Corrêa (1926–)	
Mato-Grossense	Luverdense (2004–)	
Mineiro	Atlético Mineiro (1915–1923, 1925–); Cruzeiro (1921–1925, 1927–)	Atlético Mineiro (1925–); Cruzeiro (1927–); América (1915–2007)
Paraense	Paysandu; Remo	
Paraibano	Botafogo (1934–); Campinense; Treze; Sousa (1992–)	Botafogo (1934–)
Paranaense	Coritiba (1915–); Atlético Paranaense (1924–)	Coritiba (1915–); Atlético Paranaense (1924–)
Paulista	Corinthians (1913–1914, 1916–); Santos (1913, 1916–2001, 2003–); Palmeiras (1916–); São Paulo (1930–1934, 1936–)	Corinthians (1916–); Palmeiras (1916–); São Paulo (1936–); Santos (1916–2001)
Pernambucano	Santa Cruz (1915–); Náutico (1916–); Sport Recife (1916–)	Santa Cruz (1915–); Náutico (1916–); Sport Recife (1916–); América (1915–1995)
Piauiense		
Potiguar	ABC (1919–1951, 1953–)	
Roraimense		
Sergipano	Confiança; Sergipe	
Tocantinense	Tocantinópolis (1993–)	

=== Notes ===
- Some clubs were licensed, but due to the absence of lower divisions, they were never relegated.
- Some clubs like Vasco da Gama have disputed the second level before being promoted for the first time.
- Some state leagues do not have enough data to determine the consecutive sequence of club participations.
- Until the 50s, the Campeonato Gaúcho brought together the champions of each region of Rio Grande do Sul. Grêmio and Internacional disputed the Municipal Championship of Porto Alegre before to decide who would advance to the final stage.
- Due to the 2002 Torneio Rio-São Paulo, Corinthians, Palmeiras, Santos and São Paulo did not compete in the regular edition of Campeonato Paulista. After the end of Rio-São Paulo, Corinthians, São Paulo and Palmeiras qualified, alongside Ituano to the dispute of the Supercampeonato Paulista. Santos, since it did not qualify for the Supercampeonato Paulista, had its series of participations interrupted.
- As the Campeonato Roraima does not have a second level, in practice no club has been relegated yet, however Atlético Roraima is the only team that has played in all editions of the professional era.

Source: RSSSF Brasil

== See also ==
- Brazilian football league system
- History of football in Brazil
