= Trem Desportivo Clube =

Brazilian association football club based in Macapá, Amapá, Brazil

Trem
- Full name: Trem Desportivo Clube
- Nickname: Locomotiva (Locomotive)
- Founded: 1 January 1947; 79 years ago
- Ground: Zerão
- Capacity: 13,680
- President: Socorro Marinho
- Head coach: Sandro Macapá
- League: Campeonato Brasileiro Série D Campeonato Amapaense
- 2025 2025: Série D, 37th of 64; Amapaense, 1st of 8 (champions)
Home colors	Away colors

Trem Desportivo Clube, commonly referred to as Trem, is a Brazilian professional football club based in Macapá, Amapá. Founded on 1 January 1947, it competes in the Campeonato Brasileiro Série D, the fourth tier of Brazilian football, as well as in the Campeonato Amapaense, the top flight of the Amapá state football league.

Throughout its football history, the club has won five titles in the now defunct “Copão da Amazônia” in the late 1980s, as well as 10 Amapá state titles, two of which were won during the amateur era and seven during the professional era.

== History ==
On 1 January 1947, the club was founded as Trem Desportivo Clube by Bellarmino Paraense de Barros, Benedito Malcher, the brothers Osmar and Arthur Marinho, and Walter and José Banhos, among others, in one of the most important and traditional neighborhoods of Macapá.

In 1993, the club competed in the Copa do Brasil for the first time. The club was eliminated in the first stage, by Remo (first leg, at Zerão stadium, Macapá, Remo won 5–0, the second leg, at Mangueirão, Belém, Remo won again, 2–0). In 1999, due to financial difficulties, the club closed its football section. However, some years later, the club reopened it. In 2008, Trem competed again in the Copa do Brasil, but was eliminated in the first stage by Paraná.

In 2022, Trem recorded one of the biggest victories in the history of the Brasileirão Série D, thrashing Náutico of Roraima 10–2, at Zerão.

== Colours and badge ==
The club's colors are red and black. The club's home kit, and its logo are heavily inspired by Flamengo ones. The home kit is composed of red and black horizontal stripes, white shorts and black socks.

The club name Trem means train in Portuguese language. It was the name of the bairro where the club was founded. The neighborhood was founded in the 19th century.

Trem's mascot is a locomotive, simply named Locomotiva. Locomotiva is also the club's nickname.

== Stadium ==
Like other clubs in the state, Trem does not have its own stadium. Since 2017, all football matches in Amapá are held at Zerão. Up until 2014, the team also played at Glicerão, which is currently undergoing renovation.

== Honours ==
=== Regional ===
- Copão da Amazônia
  - Winners (5): 1985, 1986, 1987, 1988, 1990

=== State ===
- Campeonato Amapaense
  - Winners (10): 1952, 1984, 2007, 2010, 2011, 2021, 2022, 2023, 2024, 2025
