= 2025 Copa do Brasil de Futebol Feminino =

2025 Copa do Brasil Feminina
Tournament details
- Country: Brazil
- Dates: 21 May – 20 November
- Teams: 65

Final positions
- Champions: Palmeiras (1st title)
- Runners-up: Ferroviária
- Supercopa Feminina: Palmeiras

Tournament statistics
- Matches played: 64
- Goals scored: 196 (3.06 per match)
- Top goal scorer: Layza (6 goals)

The 2025 Copa do Brasil de Futebol Feminino (officially the Copa do Brasil Feminina 2025) was the 11th edition of Brazil's Copa do Brasil de Futebol Feminino, and the first edition as an official domestic cup. It was held from 21 May to 20 November 2025.

The competition returned after an eight-year hiatus.

== Qualified teams ==
All 64 clubs from the three national divisions (Série A1, Série A2 and Série A3) qualified to the competition. Since no team from Tocantins participated in any of the tournaments, the highest ranked Tocantins team in the 2025 Women's Club Ranking (Paraíso) was invited to participate in a preliminary round.

Teams in italic (from the Série A2) enter the competition in the second round, while teams in bold (from the Série A1) enter the competition in the third round, and the remaining teams enter the competition in the first round.

Association	Team
(Acre (state)) Acre; 1 (A3)	Galvez
(Alagoas) Alagoas; 2 (A3)	Guarani de Paripueira
(Alagoas) Alagoas; 2 (A3)	UDA
(Amapá) Amapá; 1 (A3)	Ypiranga
(Amazonas (Brazilian state)) Amazonas; 1 (A1), 1 (A2), 3 (A3)	**3B da Amazônia**
(Amazonas (Brazilian state)) Amazonas; 1 (A1), 1 (A2), 3 (A3)	Itacoatiara
(Amazonas (Brazilian state)) Amazonas; 1 (A1), 1 (A2), 3 (A3)	Manaus
(Amazonas (Brazilian state)) Amazonas; 1 (A1), 1 (A2), 3 (A3)	Recanto Interativo
(Amazonas (Brazilian state)) Amazonas; 1 (A1), 1 (A2), 3 (A3)	Tarumã
(Bahia) Bahia; 1 (A1), 1 (A2), 2 (A3)	Atlético Alagoinhas
(Bahia) Bahia; 1 (A1), 1 (A2), 2 (A3)	**Bahia**
(Bahia) Bahia; 1 (A1), 1 (A2), 2 (A3)	Doce Mel
(Bahia) Bahia; 1 (A1), 1 (A2), 2 (A3)	Vitória
(Ceará) Ceará; 1 (A2), 1 (A3)	Ceará
(Ceará) Ceará; 1 (A2), 1 (A3)	Fortaleza
(Federal District (Brazil)) Distrito Federal; 1 (A1), 1 (A2), 1 (A3)	CRESSPOM
(Federal District (Brazil)) Distrito Federal; 1 (A1), 1 (A2), 1 (A3)	Minas Brasília
(Federal District (Brazil)) Distrito Federal; 1 (A1), 1 (A2), 1 (A3)	**Real Brasília**
(Espírito Santo) Espírito Santo; 1 (A3)	Prosperidade
(Goiás) Goiás; 1 (A3)	Vila Nova
(Maranhão) Maranhão; 1 (A3)	IAPE
(Mato Grosso) Mato Grosso; 2 (A2), 1 (A3)	Ação
(Mato Grosso) Mato Grosso; 2 (A2), 1 (A3)	Mixto
(Mato Grosso) Mato Grosso; 2 (A2), 1 (A3)	Operário FC
(Mato Grosso do Sul) Mato Grosso do Sul; 1 (A3)	Operário
(Minas Gerais) Minas Gerais; 2 (A1), 1 (A2), 1 (A3)	**América Mineiro**
(Minas Gerais) Minas Gerais; 2 (A1), 1 (A2), 1 (A3)	Atlético Mineiro
(Minas Gerais) Minas Gerais; 2 (A1), 1 (A2), 1 (A3)	**Cruzeiro**
(Minas Gerais) Minas Gerais; 2 (A1), 1 (A2), 1 (A3)	Itabirito
(Pará) Pará; 2 (A2), 1 (A3)	Paysandu
(Pará) Pará; 2 (A2), 1 (A3)	Remo
(Pará) Pará; 2 (A2), 1 (A3)	Tuna Luso
(Paraíba) Paraíba; 2 (A3)	Mixto
(Paraíba) Paraíba; 2 (A3)	VF4
(Paraná (state)) Paraná; 1 (A3)	Coritiba
(Pernambuco) Pernambuco; 1 (A1), 1 (A3)	**Sport**
(Pernambuco) Pernambuco; 1 (A1), 1 (A3)	Ipojuca
(Piauí) Piauí; 1 (A3)	Atlético Piauiense
(Rio de Janeiro (state)) Rio de Janeiro; 2 (A1), 2 (A2), 1 (A3)	Botafogo
(Rio de Janeiro (state)) Rio de Janeiro; 2 (A1), 2 (A2), 1 (A3)	**Flamengo**
(Rio de Janeiro (state)) Rio de Janeiro; 2 (A1), 2 (A2), 1 (A3)	**Fluminense**
(Rio de Janeiro (state)) Rio de Janeiro; 2 (A1), 2 (A2), 1 (A3)	Vasco da Gama
(Rio de Janeiro (state)) Rio de Janeiro; 2 (A1), 2 (A2), 1 (A3)	Pérolas Negras
Rio Grande do Norte; 1 (A3)	União
(Rio Grande do Sul) Rio Grande do Sul; 3(A1), 1 (A3)	Brasil de Farroupilha
(Rio Grande do Sul) Rio Grande do Sul; 3(A1), 1 (A3)	**Grêmio**
(Rio Grande do Sul) Rio Grande do Sul; 3(A1), 1 (A3)	**Internacional**
(Rio Grande do Sul) Rio Grande do Sul; 3(A1), 1 (A3)	**Juventude**
(Rondônia) Rondônia; 1 (A3)	Rolim de Moura
(Roraima) Roraima; 1 (A2), 1 (A3)	Rio Negro
(Roraima) Roraima; 1 (A2), 1 (A3)	São Raimundo
(Santa Catarina (state)) Santa Catarina; 1 (A2), 1 (A3)	Avaí
(Santa Catarina (state)) Santa Catarina; 1 (A2), 1 (A3)	Criciúma
(São Paulo (state)) São Paulo; 5 (A1), 3 (A2), 2 (A3)	**Corinthians**
(São Paulo (state)) São Paulo; 5 (A1), 3 (A2), 2 (A3)	**Ferroviária**
(São Paulo (state)) São Paulo; 5 (A1), 3 (A2), 2 (A3)	**Palmeiras**
(São Paulo (state)) São Paulo; 5 (A1), 3 (A2), 2 (A3)	Pinda/Ferroviária
(São Paulo (state)) São Paulo; 5 (A1), 3 (A2), 2 (A3)	Realidade Jovem
(São Paulo (state)) São Paulo; 5 (A1), 3 (A2), 2 (A3)	**Red Bull Bragantino**
(São Paulo (state)) São Paulo; 5 (A1), 3 (A2), 2 (A3)	Santos
(São Paulo (state)) São Paulo; 5 (A1), 3 (A2), 2 (A3)	São José
(São Paulo (state)) São Paulo; 5 (A1), 3 (A2), 2 (A3)	**São Paulo**
(São Paulo (state)) São Paulo; 5 (A1), 3 (A2), 2 (A3)	Taubaté
(Sergipe) Sergipe; 1 (A3)	Juventude
Tocantins	Paraíso

== Format ==
The 32 teams belonging to the Série A3 face themselves in 16 matches in the first round, with the 16 winners moving on to the second round to face the 16 teams from the Série A2 in another 16 matches. The winners of the second round move to the third round, where they face the 16 teams from the Série A1 also in 16 matches.

From now on, the 16 remaining clubs will play in eight matches in the round of 16, with the winners advancing to the quarterfinals, then semifinals, and then final. All matches of the competition are single-legged ties.

== Preliminary round ==
According to the 2025 Série A3 regulations, each state was entitled to one participant in the competition. However, the CBF announced that the 2024 Campeonato Tocantinense Feminino did not meet the requirements for a qualifying tournament, so its champions, 100 Limites/Araguaína, were excluded. The CBF awarded their berth, via Women's State Ranking, to Manaus (Amazonas). To ensure Tocantins' participation in the 2025 Copa do Brasil Feminina, the CBF held a preliminary match between the lowest-ranked Série A3 team and the highest-ranked Tocantins team in the 2025 Women's Club Ranking.

The Série A3 teams (2025 CBF ranking shown in parentheses) were:

Série A3 teams
Ceará (22); (Alagoas) UDA (24); (Federal District (Brazil)) CRESSPOM (28); (Bahia) Doce Mel (38); (Goiás) Vila Nova/UNIVERSO (40); (Amazonas (Brazilian state)) Recanto (43); (Amapá) Ypiranga (48); (Mato Grosso do Sul) Operário (49)	(Rio Grande do Sul) Brasil de Farroupilha (51); (Santa Catarina (state)) Criciúma (52); (Roraima) São Raimundo (52); (São Paulo (state)) Pinda/Ferroviária (54); (Paraná (state)) Toledo (54); (Maranhão) IAPE (57); (Amazonas (Brazilian state)) Tarumã (58); (Paraíba) Mixto (58)	(Paraná (state)) Coritiba (61); (Rio Grande do Norte) União (62); (São Paulo (state)) Realidade Jovem (65); (Rio de Janeiro (state)) Pérolas Negras (84); (Mato Grosso) Operário FC (104); (Minas Gerais) Itabirito (no rank); (Amazonas (Brazilian state)) Manaus (no rank); (Bahia) Atlético de Alagoinhas (no rank)	(Pará) Tuna Luso (no rank); (Pernambuco) Ipojuca (no rank); (Alagoas) Guarani de Paripueira (no rank); (Rondônia) Rolim de Moura (no rank); (Piauí) Atlético Piauiense (no rank); (Acre (state)) Galvez (no rank); (Espírito Santo) Prosperidade (no rank); (Sergipe) Juventude (no rank)

The Tocantins teams in the ranking (2025 CBF ranking shown in parentheses) were:

Tocantins teams
- (Tocantins) Paraíso (47)
- (Tocantins) Polivalente (86)
- (Tocantins) São Valério (104)

On 2 May 2025, the CBF announced that Juventude (Sergipe) and Paraíso (Tocantins) would play the preliminary match. The match was played on 21 May 2025.

=== Match ===
21 May 2025 Group 1	Juventude (Sergipe)	0–0 (4–3 p)	(Tocantins) Paraíso	Aracaju
15:00		Report		Stadium: Batistão; Referee: Mariana Regina de Paiva Oliveira (Rio Grande do Norte)
	Penalties
	Lais Fernanda (penalty scored); Valéria Alves (penalty scored); Flavia (penalty scored); Laureen (penalty scored)		(penalty scored) Vanusa; (penalty scored) Esquerdinha; (penalty scored) Letícia; (penalty missed) Camila; (penalty missed) Maria Lauane

== First round ==
The draw for the first round was held on 9 May 2025, 15:00 at CBF headquarters in Rio de Janeiro. The Série A3 teams and the preliminary round winners were drawn in a single group. The matches were played on 28–29 May 2025.

=== Matches ===
28 May 2025 Group 3	Toledo (Paraná (state))	1–3	(Rio Grande do Sul) Brasil de Farroupilha	Toledo
15:00		Report		Stadium: Municipal 14 de Dezembro; Referee: Jaqueline Blasius (Santa Catarina)

28 May 2025 Group 4	Pinda/Ferroviária (São Paulo (state))	3–1	(Roraima) São Raimundo	Pindamonhangaba
15:00		Report		Stadium: Dr. Antônio Pinheiro Júnior; Referee: Jenifer Alves de Freitas (Rio de Janeiro)

28 May 2025 Group 5	Realidade Jovem (São Paulo (state))	5–0	(Amazonas (Brazilian state)) Recanto	São José do Rio Preto
15:00		Report		Stadium: João Mendes Athayde; Referee: Maria Luiza Brandellero dos Santos (Paraná)

28 May 2025 Group 6	Ceará	1–1 (1–3 p)	(Rondônia) Rolim de Moura	Itaitinga
15:00		Report		Stadium: Franzé Moraes; Referee: Mariana Regina de Paiva Oliveira (Rio Grande do Norte)

28 May 2025 Group 9	Mixto (Paraíba)	0–1	(Mato Grosso do Sul) Operário	João Pessoa
15:00		Report		Stadium: Almeidão; Referee: Deborah Cecilia Cruz Correia (Pernambuco)

28 May 2025 Group 11	Doce Mel (Bahia)	4–1	(Maranhão) IAPE	Jequié
15:00		Report		Stadium: Waldomiro Borges; Referee: Francielly Fernanda Lima de Castro (Minas Gerais)

28 May 2025 Group 15	UDA (Alagoas)	0–0 (4–5 p)	(Paraná (state)) Coritiba	Maceió
15:00		Report		Stadium: Rei Pelé; Referee: Thayslane de Melo Costa (Sergipe)

28 May 2025 Grupo 10	Vila Nova/UNIVERSO (Goiás)	1–2	(Piauí) Atlético Piauiense	Goiânia
15:30		Report		Stadium: Olímpico Pedro Ludovico; Referee: Cássia França de Souza (Distrito Federal)

28 May 2025 Group 2	Ipojuca (Pernambuco)	0–0 (5–4 p)	(Bahia) Atlético de Alagoinhas	Ipojuca
16:00		Report		Stadium: Municipal Dr. Antônio Dourado Neto; Referee: Ruthyanna Camila Medeiros da Silva (Paraíba)

28 May 2025 Group 8	Operário FC (Mato Grosso)	0–1	(Espírito Santo) Prosperidade	Cuiabá
16:00		Report		Stadium: Eurico Gaspar Dutra; Referee: Karina Carvalho Rocha (Mato Grosso do Sul)

28 May 2025 Group 14	Ypiranga (Amapá)	2–0	(Acre (state)) Galvez	Macapá
16:00		Report		Stadium: Municipal Glicério Marques; Referee: Suanny Aires de Sousa (Pará)

28 May 2025 Group 16	Manaus (Amazonas (Brazilian state))	4–3	(Alagoas) Guarani de Paripueira	Manaus
16:00		Report		Stadium: Ismael Benigno; Referee: Eliane Nogueira dos Santos (Roraima)

28 May 2025 Group 12	Tarumã (Amazonas (Brazilian state))	1–2	(Sergipe) Juventude	Manaus
20:00		Report		Stadium: Municipal Carlos Zamith; Referee: Gleika Oliveira Pinheiro (Pará)

29 May 2025 Group 7	Tuna Luso (Pará)	1–1 (4–3 p)	(Federal District (Brazil)) CRESSPOM	Belém
15:00		Report		Stadium: Francisco Vasques; Referee: Adriana Costa Farias (Amazonas)

29 May 2025 Group 13	Criciúma (Santa Catarina (state))	1–2	(Rio de Janeiro (state)) Pérolas Negras	Criciúma
19:30		Report		Stadium: Heriberto Hülse; Referee: Andressa Hartmann (Rio Grande do Sul)

29 May 2025 Group 17	Itabirito (Minas Gerais)	5–1	(Rio Grande do Norte) União	Nova Lima
20:00		Report		Stadium: Castor Cifuentes; Referee: Talita Ximenes de Freitas (São Paulo)

== Second round ==
The draw for the second round was held on 2 June 2025, 13:30 at CBF headquarters in Rio de Janeiro. The 16 qualified teams from the first round and the 16 teams from the 2025 Série A2 were drawn in a single group (CBF ranking shown in parentheses).

Group
(São Paulo (state)) Santos (6); (Santa Catarina (state)) Avaí (10); (Minas Gerais) Atlético Mineiro (12); (Rio de Janeiro (state)) Botafogo (15); (São Paulo (state)) São José (18); (Federal District (Brazil)) Minas Brasília (20); (Ceará) Fortaleza (21); (Amazonas (Brazilian state)) Itacoatiara (25)	(Mato Grosso) Mixto (30); (Rio de Janeiro (state)) Vasco da Gama (31); (São Paulo (state)) AD Taubaté (32); (Pará) Remo (35); (Bahia) Doce Mel (38); (Bahia) Vitória (45); (Amapá) Ypiranga (48); (Mato Grosso do Sul) Operário (49)	(Rio Grande do Sul) Brasil de Farroupilha (51); (São Paulo (state)) Pinda/Ferroviária (54); (Paraná (state)) Coritiba (61); (São Paulo (state)) Realidade Jovem (65); (Pará) Paysandu (66); (Mato Grosso) Ação (69); (Roraima) Rio Negro (70); (Rio de Janeiro (state)) Pérolas Negras (84)	(Minas Gerais) Itabirito (no rank); (Amazonas (Brazilian state)) Manaus (no rank); (Pará) Tuna Luso (no rank); (Pernambuco) Ipojuca (no rank); (Rondônia) Rolim de Moura (no rank); (Piauí) Atlético Piauiense (no rank); (Espírito Santo) Prosperidade (no rank); (Sergipe) Juventude (no rank)

The matches were played between 9 and 11 June 2025.

=== Matches ===
9 June 2025 Group 21	Doce Mel (Bahia)	2–3	(São Paulo (state)) Pinda/Ferroviária	Jequié
15:00		Report		Stadium: Waldomiro Borges; Referee: Ruthyanna Camila Medeiros da Silva (Paraíba)

10 June 2025 Group 25	Botafogo (Rio de Janeiro (state))	1–1 (4–3 p)	(Pará) Tuna Luso	Rio de Janeiro
19:00		Report		Stadium: Olímpico Nilton Santos; Referee: Andressa Hartmann (Rio Grande do Sul)

11 June 2025 Group 19	Atlético Mineiro (Minas Gerais)	4–0	(Pará) Paysandu	Contagem
15:00		Report		Stadium: Arena Gregorão; Referee: Charly Wendy Straub Deretti (Santa Catarina)

11 June 2025 Group 20	São José (São Paulo (state))	2–2 (4–2 p)	(Amapá) Ypiranga	São José dos Campos
15:00		Report		Stadium: Centro Poliesportivo Joao do Pulo; Referee: Gleika Oliveira Pinheiro (Pará)

11 June 2025 Group 23	Vasco da Gama (Rio de Janeiro (state))	2–1	(Federal District (Brazil)) Minas Brasília	Nova Iguaçu
15:00		Report		Stadium: Nivaldo Pereira; Referee: Amarília Sampaio Coelho (Ceará)

11 June 2025 Group 24	Atlético Piauiense (Piauí)	2–0	(Mato Grosso) Ação	Teresina
15:00		Report		Stadium: Albertão; Referee: Mariana Regina de Paiva Oliveira (Rio Grande do Norte)

11 June 2025 Group 26	AD Taubaté (São Paulo (state))	0–2	(Santa Catarina (state)) Avaí	Taubaté
15:00		Report		Stadium: Joaquinzão; Referee: Karina Carvalho Rocha (Mato Grosso do Sul)

11 June 2025 Group 27	Realidade Jovem (São Paulo (state))	1–0	(Roraima) Rio Negro	São José do Rio Preto
15:00		Report		Stadium: João Mendes Athayde; Referee: Jenifer Alves de Freitas (Rio de Janeiro)

11 June 2025 Group 31	Remo (Pará)	1–1 (2–4 p)	(Mato Grosso do Sul) Operário	Belém
15:00		Report		Stadium: Mangueirão; Referee: Adriana Costa Farias (Amazonas)

11 June 2025 Group 33	Juventude (Sergipe)	2–4	(Ceará) Fortaleza	Aracaju
15:00		Report		Stadium: Batistão; Referee: Jady Jesus Caldas (Bahia)

11 June 2025 Group 29	Manaus (Amazonas (Brazilian state))	2–2 (6–5 p)	(Pernambuco) Ipojuca	Manaus
16:00		Report		Stadium: Ismael Benigno; Referee: Francielly Fernanda Lima de Castro (Minas Gerais)

11 June 2025 Group 22	Coritiba (Paraná (state))	2–1	(Rondônia) Rolim de Moura	Curitiba
19:00		Report		Stadium: Couto Pereira; Referee: Vanessa de Souza Guijansque (Espírito Santo)

11 June 2025 Group 28	Prosperidade (Espírito Santo)	1–1 (3–4 p)	(Mato Grosso) Mixto	Vargem Alta
19:00		Report		Stadium: Municipal Almiro Ofranti; Referee: Tainan Bordignon Somensi (Santa Catarina)

11 June 2025 Group 18	Itabirito (Minas Gerais)	0–1	(Bahia) Vitória	Nova Lima
20:00		Report		Stadium: Castor Cifuentes; Referee: Adeli Mara Monteiro (São Paulo)

11 June 2025 Group 32	Brasil de Farroupilha (Rio Grande do Sul)	1–1 (3–2 p)	(Amazonas (Brazilian state)) Itacoatiara	Farroupilha
20:00		Report		Stadium: Estádio das Castanheiras; Referee: Maria Luiza Brandellero dos Santos (Paraná)

11 June 2025 Group 30	Santos (São Paulo (state))	3–0	(Rio de Janeiro (state)) Pérolas Negras	Santos
21:00		Report		Stadium: Urbano Caldeira; Referee: Cássia França de Souza (Distrito Federal)

== Third round ==
The draw for the third round was held on 8 July 2025, 14:30 at Granja Comary in Teresópolis. The 16 qualified teams from the second round and the 16 teams from the 2025 Série A1 were drawn in a single group (CBF ranking shown in parentheses).

Group
(São Paulo (state)) Corinthians (1); (São Paulo (state)) Ferroviária (2); (São Paulo (state)) São Paulo (3); (São Paulo (state)) Palmeiras (4); (Rio Grande do Sul) Internacional (5); (São Paulo (state)) Santos (6); (Rio Grande do Sul) Grêmio (7); (Rio de Janeiro (state)) Flamengo (8)	(Minas Gerais) Cruzeiro (9); (Santa Catarina (state)) Avaí (10); (Federal District (Brazil)) Real Brasília (11); (Minas Gerais) Atlético Mineiro (12); (São Paulo (state)) Red Bull Bragantino (13); Bahia (14); (Rio de Janeiro (state)) Botafogo (15); (Rio de Janeiro (state)) Fluminense (16)	(Minas Gerais) América Mineiro (17); (São Paulo (state)) São José (18); (Ceará) Fortaleza (21); (Pernambuco) Sport (27); (Amazonas (Brazilian state)) 3B da Amazônia (29); (Mato Grosso) Mixto (30); (Rio de Janeiro (state)) Vasco da Gama (31); (Rio Grande do Sul) Juventude (34)	(Bahia) Vitória (45); (Mato Grosso do Sul) Operário (49); (Rio Grande do Sul) Brasil de Farroupilha (51); (São Paulo (state)) Pinda/Ferroviária (54); (Paraná (state)) Coritiba (61); (São Paulo (state)) Realidade Jovem (65); (Amazonas (Brazilian state)) Manaus (no rank); (Piauí) Atlético Piauiense (no rank)

The matches were played between 5 and 7 August 2025.

=== Matches ===
5 August 2025 Group 38	Atlético Piauiense (Piauí)	3–0	(São Paulo (state)) São José	Teresina
15:00		Report		Stadium: Albertão; Referee: Eliane Nogueira dos Santos (Roraima)

5 August 2025 Group 40	Sport (Pernambuco)	10–0	(Amazonas (Brazilian state)) Manaus	Recife
15:00		Report		Stadium: Ilha do Retiro; Referee: Ruthyanna Camila Medeiros da Silva (Paraíba)

5 August 2025 Group 43	Juventude (Rio Grande do Sul)	2–2 (4–2 p)	(Ceará) Fortaleza	Caxias do Sul
15:00		Report		Stadium: Alfredo Jaconi; Referee: Maria Luiza Brandellero dos Santos (Paraná)

5 August 2025 Group 46	Red Bull Bragantino (São Paulo (state))	2–1	(Rio de Janeiro (state)) Botafogo	Santana de Parnaíba
19:00		Report		Stadium: Municipal Prefeito Gabriel Marques da Silva; Referee: Suanny Aires de Sousa (Pará)

6 August 2025 Group 34	Avaí (Santa Catarina (state))	0–4	(São Paulo (state)) Palmeiras	Caçador
15:00		Report		Stadium: Salézio Kindermann; Referee: Jady Jesus Caldas (Bahia)

6 August 2025 Group 35	Coritiba (Paraná (state))	1–5	(São Paulo (state)) Ferroviária	Curitiba
15:00		Report		Stadium: Couto Pereira; Referee: Jenifer Alves de Freitas (Rio de Janeiro)

6 August 2025 Group 41	Bahia	1–0	(Rio Grande do Sul) Grêmio	Feira de Santana
15:00		Report		Stadium: Joia da Princesa; Referee: Marianna Nanni Batalha (São Paulo)

6 August 2025 Group 44	Real Brasília (Federal District (Brazil))	0–2	(Minas Gerais) Atlético Mineiro	Gama
15:00		Report		Stadium: Bezerrão; Referee: Rejane Caetano da Silva (Rio de Janeiro)

6 August 2025 Group 47	Flamengo (Rio de Janeiro (state))	6–0	(Mato Grosso do Sul) Operário	Rio de Janeiro
15:00		Report		Stadium: Luso Brasileiro; Referee: Tainan Bordignon Somensi (Santa Catarina)

6 August 2025 Group 49	Pinda/Ferroviária (São Paulo (state))	1–1 (2–4 p)	(São Paulo (state)) Realidade Jovem	Pindamonhangaba
15:00		Report		Stadium: Dr. Antônio Pinheiro Júnior; Referee: Francielly Fernanda Lima de Castro (Minas Gerais)

6 August 2025 Group 48	Cruzeiro (Minas Gerais)	1–1 (2–4 p)	(São Paulo (state)) Corinthians	Nova Lima
16:30		Report		Stadium: Castor Cifuentes; Referee: Cássia França de Souza (Distrito Federal)

6 August 2025 Group 37	Internacional (Rio Grande do Sul)	3–1	(Amazonas (Brazilian state)) 3B da Amazônia	Porto Alegre
19:00		Report		Stadium: Passo D'Areia; Referee: Talita Ximenes de Freitas (São Paulo)

6 August 2025 Group 39	Vasco da Gama (Rio de Janeiro (state))	1–3	(São Paulo (state)) São Paulo	Rio de Janeiro
19:30		Report		Stadium: São Januário; Referee: Elizabete Esmeralda Cordeiro dos Santos Gomes (Ceará)

6 August 2025 Group 36	Mixto (Mato Grosso)	1–3	(Bahia) Vitória	Cuiabá
20:00		Report		Stadium: Eurico Gaspar Dutra; Referee: Mariana Regina de Paiva Oliveira (Rio Grande do Norte)

7 August 2025 Group 42	Fluminense (Rio de Janeiro (state))	3–0	(Rio Grande do Sul) Brasil de Farroupilha	Rio de Janeiro
15:00		Report		Stadium: Moça Bonita; Referee: Gleika Oliveira Pinheiro (Pará)

7 August 2025 Group 45	América Mineiro (Minas Gerais)	1–0	(São Paulo (state)) Santos	Belo Horizonte
15:00		Report		Stadium: Arena Independência; Referee: Andressa Hartmann (Rio Grande do Sul)

== Round of 16 ==
The draw for the round of 16 was held on 12 August 2025, 11:30 at CBF headquarters in Rio de Janeiro. The 16 qualified teams from the third round were drawn in a single group (CBF ranking shown in parentheses).

Group
(São Paulo (state)) Corinthians (1); (São Paulo (state)) Ferroviária (2); (São Paulo (state)) São Paulo (3); (São Paulo (state)) Palmeiras (4); (Rio Grande do Sul) Internacional (5); (Rio de Janeiro (state)) Flamengo (8); (Minas Gerais) Atlético Mineiro (12); (São Paulo (state)) Red Bull Bragantino (13)	Bahia (14); (Rio de Janeiro (state)) Fluminense (16); (Minas Gerais) América Mineiro (17); (Pernambuco) Sport (27); (Rio Grande do Sul) Juventude (34); (Bahia) Vitória (45); (São Paulo (state)) Realidade Jovem (65); (Piauí) Atlético Piauiense (no rank)

The matches will be played between 16 and 18 September 2025.

=== Matches ===
16 September 2025 Group 55	Sport (Pernambuco)	3–1	(São Paulo (state)) Realidade Jovem	Recife
15:00		Report		Stadium: Ilha do Retiro; Referee: Eliane Nogueira dos Santos (Roraima)

16 September 2025 Group 50	Bahia	1–0	(Minas Gerais) Atlético Mineiro	Alagoinhas
18:30		Report		Stadium: Municipal Antônio de Figueiredo Carneiro; Referee: Mariana Regina de Paiva Oliveira (Rio Grande do Norte)

17 September 2025 Group 52	Corinthians (São Paulo (state))	3–0	(Rio Grande do Sul) Juventude	São Paulo
15:00		Report		Stadium: Parque São Jorge; Referee: Jady Jesus Caldas (Bahia)

17 September 2025 Group 53	Red Bull Bragantino (São Paulo (state))	1–0	(Piauí) Atlético Piauiense	Santana de Parnaíba
17:00		Report		Stadium: Municipal Prefeito Gabriel Marques da Silva; Referee: Adriana Costa Farias (Amazonas)

17 September 2025 Group 56	São Paulo (São Paulo (state))	1–0	(Rio de Janeiro (state)) Flamengo	São Paulo
18:00		Report		Stadium: MorumBIS; Referee: Tainan Bordignon Somensi (Santa Catarina)

17 September 2025 Group 54	Palmeiras (São Paulo (state))	3–0	(Minas Gerais) América Mineiro	Barueri
19:00		Report		Stadium: Arena Barueri; Referee: Sâmia Kelle de Amorim Alves (Rio de Janeiro)

18 September 2025 Group 57	Ferroviária (São Paulo (state))	3–0	(Bahia) Vitória	Araraquara
16:00		Report		Stadium: Fonte Luminosa; Referee: Michelle Peixoto Safatle (Ceará)

18 September 2025 Group 51	Internacional (Rio Grande do Sul)	2–0	(Rio de Janeiro (state)) Fluminense	Porto Alegre
18:00		Report		Stadium: Passo D'Areia; Referee: Karina Carvalho Rocha (Mato Grosso do Sul)

== Quarter-finals ==
The draw for the quarter-finals was held on 19 September 2025, 11:00 at CBF headquarters in Rio de Janeiro. The 8 qualified teams from the round of 16 were drawn in a single group (CBF ranking shown in parentheses).

Group
- (São Paulo (state)) Corinthians (1)
- (São Paulo (state)) Ferroviária (2)
- (São Paulo (state)) São Paulo (3)
- (São Paulo (state)) Palmeiras (4)
- (Rio Grande do Sul) Internacional (5)
- (São Paulo (state)) Red Bull Bragantino (13)
- Bahia (14)
- (Pernambuco) Sport (27)

The matches were played on 24 and 25 September 2025.

=== Matches ===
24 September 2025 Group 60	Red Bull Bragantino (São Paulo (state))	1–1 (1–3 p)	Bahia	Bragança Paulista
15:30		Report		Stadium: Cícero de Souza Marques; Referee: Francielly Fernanda Lima de Castro (Minas Gerais)

24 September 2025 Group 61	São Paulo (São Paulo (state))	3–1	(São Paulo (state)) Corinthians	Santana de Parnaíba
18:00		Report		Stadium: Municipal Prefeito Gabriel Marques da Silva; Referee: Daiane Caroline Muniz dos Santos (São Paulo)

25 September 2025 Group 58	Palmeiras (São Paulo (state))	5–0	(Pernambuco) Sport	Barueri
18:00		Report		Stadium: Arena Barueri; Referee: Thayslane de Melo Costa (Sergipe)

25 September 2025 Group 59	Internacional (Rio Grande do Sul)	0–2	(São Paulo (state)) Ferroviária	Porto Alegre
20:00		Report		Stadium: Passo D'Areia; Referee: Rejane Caetano da Silva (Rio de Janeiro)

== Semi-finals ==
The draw for the semi-finals were held on 9 October 2025, 11:00 at CBF headquarters in Rio de Janeiro. The 4 qualified teams from the quarter-finals were drawn in a single group (CBF ranking shown in parentheses).

Group
- (São Paulo (state)) Ferroviária (2)
- (São Paulo (state)) São Paulo (3)
- (São Paulo (state)) Palmeiras (4)
- Bahia (14)

The matches were played on 4 November 2025.

=== Matches ===
4 November 2025 Group 63	Ferroviária (São Paulo (state))	2–0	Bahia	Araraquara
19:00		Report		Stadium: Fonte Luminosa; Referee: Andreza Helena de Siqueira (Minas Gerais)

4 November 2025 Group 62	São Paulo (São Paulo (state))	0–4	(São Paulo (state)) Palmeiras	Campinas
21:30		Report		Stadium: Moisés Lucarelli; Referee: Deborah Cecilia Cruz Correia (Pernambuco)

== Final ==
The draw to determine the home and away teams for the final was held on 6 November 2025, 14:30 at CBF headquarters in Rio de Janeiro. The finalists were drawn in a single group (CBF ranking shown in parentheses).

Group
- (São Paulo (state)) Ferroviária (2)
- (São Paulo (state)) Palmeiras (4)

The match was played on 20 November 2025.

=== Match ===
20 November 2025
15:30

Ferroviária (São Paulo (state))	2–4	(São Paulo (state)) Palmeiras
Andressa Pereira 37'; Raquel 90+3'	Report	Amanda Gutierres 21'; Brena 45+2'; Tainá Maranhão 49' (pen.); Landázury 79'

Fonte Luminosa, Araraquara
Referee: Daiane Caroline Muniz dos Santos (São Paulo)

== Top goalscorers ==
Rank	Player	Club	Goals
1	Layza	Sport	6
2	Brena	Palmeiras	4
2	Sissi	Ferroviária	4
4	Ingrid	Realidade Jovem	3
4	Mariana Fernandes	Flamengo	3
4	Sabrina	Manaus	3
4	Tainá Maranhão	Palmeiras	3
4	Victória	Corinthians	3

Source:CBF
