= 2023 Campeonato Brasileiro de Futebol Feminino Série A3 =

2023 Brazilian soccer competition

Campeonato Brasileiro de Futebol Feminino Série A3
- Season: 2023
- Dates: 21 April – 25 June
- Champions: Mixto (1st title)
- Promoted: Juventude; Mixto; Remo; VF4
- Matches: 62
- Goals: 170 (2.74 per match)
- Top goalscorer: Bia Batista (10 goals)
- Biggest home win: Juventude 6–1 Criciúma; Round of 32, 1st leg, 23 April
- Biggest away win: Aliança/Goiás 0–5 Mixto; Round of 32, 2nd leg, 29 April
- Highest scoring: 7 goals Juventude 6–1 Criciúma; Round of 32, 1st leg, 23 April

The 2023 Campeonato Brasileiro de Futebol Feminino Série A3 (officially the Brasileirão Feminino Binance A3 2023 for sponsorship reasons) was the second season of the Campeonato Brasileiro de Futebol Feminino Série A3, the third level of women's football in Brazil. The tournament was organized by CBF. It started on 21 April and ended on 25 June 2023.

Thirty-two teams competed in the tournament. Twenty-eight qualified from their state leagues and four relegated from the 2022 Série A2 (Aliança/Goiás, CEFAMA, Iranduba and Vasco da Gama). As the Federação Amazonense de Futebol suspended the Iranduba men's team for two years due to their possible involvement in match-fixing, the Iranduba women's team was expelled from the Série A3. They were replaced by VF4 (2022 Série A3 fifth place).

The four semi-finalists, Juventude, Mixto, Remo and VF4, were promoted to the 2024 Campeonato Brasileiro de Futebol Feminino Série A2.

Mixto defeated Remo 4–0, on aggregate, in the finals to win their first title.

== Format ==
The competition was a single-elimination tournament with each round contested a home-and-away two-legged basis. The first rounds were organized regionally. In the round of 32, the highest-ranked team in the 2023 Women's Club Ranking hosted the second leg. If the teams had the same rank the highest-ranked-federation team in the 2023 Women's State Ranking would host the second leg.

Starting from the round of 16, the teams were seeded according to their performance in the tournament. The teams were ranked according to overall points. If tied on overall points, the following criteria would be used to determine the ranking: 1. Overall wins; 2. Overall goal difference; 3. Overall goals scored; 4. Fewest red cards in the tournament; 5. Fewest yellow cards in the tournament; 6. Draw in the headquarters of the Brazilian Football Confederation (Regulations Article 15).

If tied on aggregate, the away goals rule would not be used, extra time would not be played, and the penalty shoot-out would be used to determine the winners (Regulations Article 14).

The four semi-finalists were promoted to the 2024 Campeonato Brasileiro de Futebol Feminino Série A2.

== Teams ==
Location of teams in 2023 Série A3

=== Federation ranking ===
The number of teams from each state was chosen based on the CBF Women's State Ranking (WSR), with São Paulo having two berths, and the other states with one berth each.

Rank	Federation	Coeff.	Teams	Notes
1	(São Paulo (state)) São Paulo	67,202	2	
2	(Rio de Janeiro (state)) Rio de Janeiro	21,010	1	+1 (A2)
3	Rio Grande do Sul	18,448	1	
4	(Federal District (Brazil)) Distrito Federal	16,360	1	+1 (WSR)
5	Minas Gerais	16,214	1	
6	(Santa Catarina (state)) Santa Catarina	15,298	1	
7	Bahia	12,208	1	+1 (WSR)
8	(Amazonas (Brazilian state)) Amazonas	9,880	1	+1 (WSR)
9	Ceará	8,626	1	
10	(Paraná (state)) Paraná	8,222	1	
11	Pernambuco	8,104	1	
12	Pará	6,638	1	
13	Goiás^{[1]}	6,354	0	+1 (A2)
14	Rondônia^{[1]}	4,600	0	
15	Paraíba	4,294	1	+1 (A3)
16	Alagoas	4,146	1	
17	Maranhão	3,488	1	+1 (A2)
18	Mato Grosso	3,232	1	
19	Piauí	2,990	1	
20	Amapá	2,940	1	
21	Tocantins	2,930	1	
22	Espírito Santo	2,894	1	
23	Rio Grande do Norte^{[1]}	2,860	0	
24	Sergipe	2,850	1	
24	Mato Grosso do Sul	2,850	1	
24	(Acre (state)) Acre	2,850	1	
27	Roraima	2,166	1	

^{1} Since some teams declined to participate or were excluded, the Goiás, Rondônia and Rio Grande do Norte berths were granted to Distrito Federal, Amazonas and Bahia, respectively, through the CBF Women's State Ranking.

=== Participating teams ===
Federation	Team	Home city	Qualification method
(Acre (state)) Acre	Assermurb	Rio Branco	2022 Campeonato Acreano Feminino champions
Alagoas	Acauã	Maceió	2022 Campeonato Alagoano Feminino runners-up
Amapá	Ypiranga-AP^{[a]}	Macapá	2021 Campeonato Amapaense Feminino champions
(Amazonas (Brazilian state)) Amazonas	Recanto	Manaus	2022 Campeonato Amazonense Feminino champions
(Amazonas (Brazilian state)) Amazonas	Tarumã^{[b]}	Manaus	2022 Campeonato Amazonense Feminino 5th place
Bahia	Doce Mel/Jequié EC	Jequié	2022 Campeonato Baiano Feminino runners-up
Bahia	Astro^{[c]}	Feira de Santana	2022 Campeonato Baiano Feminino 3rd place
Ceará	Guarani de Juazeiro	Juazeiro do Norte	2022 Campeonato Cearense Feminino 3rd place
(Federal District (Brazil)) Distrito Federal	Capital	Paranoá	2022 Campeonato Brasiliense Feminino 4th place
(Federal District (Brazil)) Distrito Federal	Ceilândia^{[d]}	Ceilândia	2022 Campeonato Brasiliense Feminino 5th place
Espírito Santo	Vila Nova-ES	Vila Velha	2022 Campeonato Capixaba Feminino champions
Goiás	Aliança/Goiás	Goiânia	2022 Campeonato Feminino Série A2 16th place
Maranhão	IAPE	São Luís	2022 Campeonato Maranhense Feminino champions
Maranhão	CEFAMA	São José de Ribamar	2022 Campeonato Feminino Série A2 15th place
Mato Grosso	Mixto	Cuiabá	2022 Campeonato Mato-Grossense Feminino champions
Mato Grosso do Sul	Operário	Campo Grande	2022 Campeonato Sul-Mato-Grossense Feminino champions
Minas Gerais	Uberlândia	Uberlândia	2022 Campeonato Mineiro Feminino 4th place
Pará	Remo	Belém	2022 Campeonato Paraense Feminino champions
Paraíba	Mixto (PB)	João Pessoa	2022 Campeonato Paraibano Feminino runners-up
Paraíba	VF4^{[e]}	João Pessoa	2022 Campeonato Feminino Série A3 5th place
(Paraná (state)) Paraná	Toledo	Toledo	2022 Campeonato Paranaense Feminino runners-up
Pernambuco	Náutico	Recife	2022 Campeonato Pernambucano Feminino runners-up
Piauí	Tiradentes	Teresina	2022 Campeonato Piauiense Feminino champions
(Rio de Janeiro (state)) Rio de Janeiro	Pérolas Negras	Resende	2022 Campeonato Carioca Feminino 5th place
(Rio de Janeiro (state)) Rio de Janeiro	Vasco da Gama	Rio de Janeiro	2022 Campeonato Feminino Série A2 13th place
Rio Grande do Sul	Juventude	Caxias do Sul	2022 Campeonato Gaúcho Feminino 3rd place
Roraima	São Raimundo	Boa Vista	2022 Campeonato Roraimense Feminino champions
(Santa Catarina (state)) Santa Catarina	Criciúma	Criciúma	2022 Campeonato Catarinense Feminino runners-up
(São Paulo (state)) São Paulo	São Bernardo	São Bernardo do Campo	2022 Campeonato Paulista Feminino 8th place
(São Paulo (state)) São Paulo	Pinda/Ferroviária	Pindamonhangaba	2022 Campeonato Paulista Feminino 10th place
Sergipe	Estanciano	Estância	2022 Campeonato Sergipano Feminino champions
Tocantins	Polivalente	Palmas	2022 Campeonato Tocantinense Feminino champions

^{a} As the 2022 Campeonato Amapaense Feminino was not played, the Federação Amapaense de Futebol granted the Amapá berth to Ypiranga (AP) (2021 Campeonato Amapaense Feminino champions).
^{b} Originally, Porto Velho (2022 Campeonato Rondoniense Feminino runners-up) qualified for the Série A3, however, CBF announced that the 2022 Campeonato Rondoniense Feminino did not meet the requirements as qualification tournament. CBF awarded the berth, via Women's State Ranking, to Penarol (2022 Campeonato Amazonense Feminino 3rd place). However, Penarol declined to participate and they were replaced by Tarumã (2022 Campeonato Amazonense Feminino 5th place).
^{c} Originally, União/ABC (2022 Campeonato Potiguar Feminino champions) qualified for the Série A3, however, CBF announced that the 2022 Campeonato Potiguar Feminino did not meet the requirements as qualification tournament. CBF awarded the berth, via Women's State Ranking, to Astro (2022 Campeonato Baiano Feminino 3rd place).
^{d} Atletas de Jesus (2022 Campeonato Goiano Feminino 3rd place) declined to participate in the Série A3. They were replaced, via Women's State Ranking, by Ceilândia (2022 Campeonato Brasiliense Feminino 5th place).
^{e} As the Federação Amazonense de Futebol suspended the Iranduba men's team for two years due to their possible involvement in match-fixing, the Iranduba women's team (2022 Campeonato Brasileiro de Futebol Feminino Série A2 14th place) was expelled from the Série A3. They were replaced by VF4 (2022 Campeonato Brasileiro de Futebol Feminino Série A3 5th place).

== Round of 32 ==
The matches were played from 21 April to 2 May 2023.

=== Matches ===
Team 1	Agg.	Team 2	1st leg	2nd leg
Polivalente (Tocantins)	1–1 (4–1 p)	(Piauí) Tiradentes	1–1	0–0
Mixto (Mato Grosso)	7–0	Aliança/Goiás	2–0	5–0
Ceilândia (Federal District (Brazil))	2–6	(Federal District (Brazil)) Capital	1–4	1–2
Uberlândia (Minas Gerais)	8–1	(Espírito Santo) Vila Nova-ES	4–1	4–0
Pérolas Negras (Rio de Janeiro (state))	4–3	(Rio de Janeiro (state)) Vasco da Gama	2–2	2–1
Pinda/Ferroviária (São Paulo (state))	4–1	(São Paulo (state)) São Bernardo	4–1	0–0
Operário (Mato Grosso do Sul)	2–3	(Paraná (state)) Toledo	2–1	0–2
Juventude (Rio Grande do Sul)	8–2	(Santa Catarina (state)) Criciúma	6–1	2–1
Assermurb (Acre (state))	3–2	(Roraima) São Raimundo	3–1	0–1
Tarumã (Amazonas (Brazilian state))	0–7	(Amazonas (Brazilian state)) Recanto	0–3	0–4
Remo (Pará)	2–2 (10–9 p)	(Amapá) Ypiranga-AP	2–2	0–0
IAPE (Maranhão)	7–3	(Maranhão) CEFAMA	4–1	3–2
Guarani de Juazeiro (Ceará)	5–0	(Pernambuco) Náutico	3–0	2–0
Mixto (PB) (Paraíba)	2–3	(Paraíba) VF4	1–2	1–1
Acauã (Alagoas)	3–2	(Sergipe) Estanciano	3–1	0–1
Astro (Bahia)	1–5	(Bahia) Doce Mel/Jequié EC	1–2	0–3

== Round of 16 ==
The matches were played from 6 to 14 May 2023.

=== Matches ===
Team 1	Agg.	Team 2	1st leg	2nd leg
Polivalente (Tocantins)	1–5	(Mato Grosso) Mixto	1–2	0–3
Capital (Federal District (Brazil))	1–3	(Minas Gerais) Uberlândia	1–1	0–2
Pérolas Negras (Rio de Janeiro (state))	2–3	(São Paulo (state)) Pinda/Ferroviária	0–2	2–1
Toledo (Paraná (state))	0–4	(Rio Grande do Sul) Juventude	0–2	0–2
Assermurb (Acre (state))	0–3	(Amazonas (Brazilian state)) Recanto	0–0	0–3
Remo (Pará)	4–2	(Maranhão) IAPE	1–0	3–2
VF4 (Paraíba)	1–1 (4–3 p)	(Ceará) Guarani de Juazeiro	1–1	0–0
Acauã (Alagoas)	2–5	(Bahia) Doce Mel/Jequié EC	2–2	0–3

== Quarter-finals ==
The matches were played from 20 to 28 May 2023.

=== Matches ===
Team 1	Agg.	Team 2	1st leg	2nd leg
Uberlândia (Minas Gerais)	1–2	(Mato Grosso) Mixto	0–1	1–1
Pinda/Ferroviária (São Paulo (state))	2–2 (2–3 p)	(Rio Grande do Sul) Juventude	2–2	0–0
Remo (Pará)	3–2	(Amazonas (Brazilian state)) Recanto	3–1	0–1
VF4 (Paraíba)	6–2	(Bahia) Doce Mel/Jequié EC	4–0	2–2

== Semi-finals ==
The matches were played from 3 to 11 June 2023.

=== Matches ===
Team 1	Agg.	Team 2	1st leg	2nd leg
Juventude (Rio Grande do Sul)	0–4	(Mato Grosso) Mixto	0–2	0–2
VF4 (Paraíba)	2–3	(Pará) Remo	2–0	0–3

== Finals ==
The matches were played on 17 and 25 June 2023.

=== Matches ===
Team 1	Agg.	Team 2	1st leg	2nd leg
Remo (Pará)	0–4	(Mato Grosso) Mixto	0–2	0–2

17 June 2023
19:30

Remo (Pará)	0–2	(Mato Grosso) Mixto
	Report	Bia Batista 4'; Ray Pires 45'

Baenão, Belém
Referee: Ruthyanna Camila Medeiros da Silva (Paraíba)

25 June 2023
11:00

Mixto (Mato Grosso)	2–0	(Pará) Remo
Bia Batista 37'; Gaby 58' (pen.)	Report

Arena Pantanal, Cuiabá
Referee: Elizabete Esmeralda Cordeiro dos Santos Gomes (Ceará)

== Top goalscorers ==
Rank	Player	Team	Goals
1	Bia Batista	(Mato Grosso) Mixto	10
2	Lu Meireles	(Paraíba) VF4	6
3	Cristina Lima	(Bahia) Doce Mel/Jequié EC	4
3	Maria Alane	(Ceará) Guarani de Juazeiro	4

Source: CBF
