= 2025 in Brazilian football =

Football in Brazil
- Season: 2025

Men's football
- Série A: Flamengo
- Série B: Coritiba
- Série C: Ponte Preta
- Série D: Barra
- Copa do Brasil: Corinthians
- Supercopa: Flamengo

Women's football
- Série A1: Corinthians
- Série A2: Santos
- Série A3: Atlético Piauiense
- Copa do Brasil Feminina: Palmeiras
- Supercopa Feminina: São Paulo

The following article presents a summary of the 2025 football (soccer) season in Brazil, which was the 124th season of competitive football in the country.

== Campeonato Brasileiro Série A ==
The 2025 Campeonato Brasileiro Série A started on 29 March 2025 and ended on 7 December 2025.

- Atlético Mineiro
- Bahia
- Botafogo
- Ceará
- Corinthians
- Cruzeiro
- Flamengo
- Fluminense
- Fortaleza
- Grêmio
- Internacional
- Juventude
- Mirassol
- Palmeiras
- Red Bull Bragantino
- Santos
- São Paulo
- Sport
- Vasco da Gama
- Vitória

Pos	Team	Pld	W	D	L	GF	GA	GD	Pts	Qualification or relegation
1	Flamengo (C)	38	23	10	5	78	27	+51	79	Qualification for Copa Libertadores group stage (Note: Flamengo qualified for the Copa Libertadores group stage by winning the 2025 Copa Libertadores.)
2	Palmeiras	38	23	7	8	66	33	+33	76	Qualification for Copa Libertadores group stage
3	Cruzeiro	38	19	13	6	55	31	+24	70	Qualification for Copa Libertadores group stage
4	Mirassol	38	18	13	7	63	39	+24	67	Qualification for Copa Libertadores group stage
5	Fluminense	38	19	7	12	50	39	+11	64	Qualification for Copa Libertadores group stage
6	Botafogo	38	17	12	9	58	38	+20	63	Qualification for Copa Libertadores second stage
7	Bahia	38	17	9	12	50	47	+3	60	Qualification for Copa Libertadores second stage
8	São Paulo	38	14	9	15	43	47	−4	51	Qualification for Copa Sudamericana group stage
9	Grêmio	38	13	10	15	47	50	−3	49	Qualification for Copa Sudamericana group stage
10	Red Bull Bragantino	38	14	6	18	45	57	−12	48	Qualification for Copa Sudamericana group stage
11	Atlético Mineiro	38	12	12	14	43	44	−1	48	Qualification for Copa Sudamericana group stage
12	Santos	38	12	11	15	45	50	−5	47	Qualification for Copa Sudamericana group stage
13	Corinthians	38	12	11	15	42	47	−5	47	Qualification for Copa Libertadores group stage (Note: Corinthians qualified for the Copa Libertadores group stage by winning the 2025 Copa do Brasil.)
14	Vasco da Gama	38	13	6	19	55	60	−5	45	Qualification for Copa Sudamericana group stage
15	Vitória	38	11	12	15	35	52	−17	45	
16	Internacional	38	11	11	16	44	57	−13	44	
17	Ceará (R)	38	11	10	17	34	40	−6	43	Relegation to Campeonato Brasileiro Série B
18	Fortaleza (R)	38	11	10	17	44	58	−14	43	Relegation to Campeonato Brasileiro Série B
19	Juventude (R)	38	9	8	21	35	69	−34	35	Relegation to Campeonato Brasileiro Série B
20	Sport (R)	38	2	11	25	28	75	−47	17	Relegation to Campeonato Brasileiro Série B

Source: CBF
Rules for classification: 1) points; 2) wins; 3) goal difference; 4) goals scored; 5) head-to-head results (only between two teams); 6) fewest red cards; 7) fewest yellow cards; 8) drawing of lots.
(C) Champions; (R) Relegated
Notes:

Flamengo won the league.

=== Relegation ===
The four worst placed teams, Sport, Juventude, Ceará and Fortaleza, were relegated to the following year's second level.

== Campeonato Brasileiro Série B ==
The 2025 Campeonato Brasileiro Série B started on 4 April 2025 and ended on 23 November 2025.

- Amazonas
- América Mineiro
- Athletic
- Athletico Paranaense
- Atlético Goianiense
- Avaí
- Botafogo (SP)
- Chapecoense
- Coritiba
- CRB
- Criciúma
- Cuiabá
- Ferroviária
- Goiás
- Novorizontino
- Operário Ferroviário
- Paysandu
- Remo
- Vila Nova
- Volta Redonda

Pos	Team	Pld	W	D	L	GF	GA	GD	Pts	Promotion or relegation
1	Coritiba (C, P)	38	19	11	8	39	23	+16	68	Promotion to 2026 Campeonato Brasileiro Série A
2	Athletico Paranaense (P)	38	19	8	11	53	43	+10	65	Promotion to 2026 Campeonato Brasileiro Série A
3	Chapecoense (P)	38	18	8	12	52	35	+17	62	Promotion to 2026 Campeonato Brasileiro Série A
4	Remo (P)	38	16	14	8	51	39	+12	62	Promotion to 2026 Campeonato Brasileiro Série A
5	Criciúma	38	17	10	11	47	33	+14	61	
6	Goiás	38	17	10	11	42	37	+5	61	
7	Novorizontino	38	15	15	8	43	32	+11	60	
8	CRB	38	16	8	14	45	40	+5	56	
9	Avaí	38	14	14	10	50	40	+10	56	
10	Cuiabá	38	14	12	12	43	44	−1	54	
11	Atlético Goianiense	38	13	13	12	39	38	+1	52	
12	Operário Ferroviário	38	12	12	14	40	44	−4	48	
13	Vila Nova	38	11	14	13	40	44	−4	47	
14	América Mineiro	38	12	10	16	41	44	−3	46	
15	Athletic	38	12	8	18	43	53	−10	44	
16	Botafogo-SP	38	10	12	16	32	52	−20	42	
17	Ferroviária (R)	38	8	16	14	43	52	−9	40	Relegation to 2026 Campeonato Brasileiro Série C
18	Amazonas (R)	38	8	12	18	38	55	−17	36	Relegation to 2026 Campeonato Brasileiro Série C
19	Volta Redonda (R)	38	8	12	18	26	43	−17	36	Relegation to 2026 Campeonato Brasileiro Série C
20	Paysandu (R)	38	5	13	20	36	52	−16	28	Relegation to 2026 Campeonato Brasileiro Série C

Source: CBF
Rules for classification: 1) points; 2) wins; 3) goal difference; 4) goals scored; 5) head-to-head results (only between 2 teams); 6) fewest red cards; 7) fewest yellow cards; 8) drawing of lots.
(C) Champions; (P) Promoted; (R) Relegated

Coritiba won the league.

=== Promotion ===
The four best placed teams, Coritiba, Athletico Paranaense, Chapecoense and Remo, were promoted to the following year's first level.

=== Relegation ===
The four worst placed teams, Paysandu, Volta Redonda, Amazonas and Ferroviária, were relegated to the following year's third level.

== Campeonato Brasileiro Série C ==
The 2025 Campeonato Brasileiro Série C started on 12 April 2025 and ended on 25 October 2025.

- ABC
- Anápolis
- Botafogo (PB)
- Brusque
- Caxias
- Confiança
- CSA
- Figueirense
- Floresta
- Guarani
- Itabaiana
- Ituano
- Londrina
- Maringá
- Náutico
- Ponte Preta
- Retrô
- São Bernardo
- Tombense
- Ypiranga (RS)

The Campeonato Brasileiro Série C final was played between Ponte Preta and Londrina.

18 October 2025

Londrina	0–0	Ponte Preta

Estádio Vitorino Gonçalves Dias, Londrina

25 October 2025

Ponte Preta	2–0	Londrina

Estádio Moisés Lucarelli, Campinas

Ponte Preta won the league after beating Londrina.

=== Promotion ===
The four best placed teams, Ponte Preta, São Bernardo, Londrina and Náutico, were promoted to the following year's second level.

=== Relegation ===
The four worst placed teams, Tombense, Retrô, ABC and CSA, were relegated to the following year's fourth level.

== Campeonato Brasileiro Série D ==
The 2025 Campeonato Brasileiro Série D started on 19 April 2025 and ended on 4 October 2025.

- Água Santa
- Águia de Marabá
- Altos
- América de Natal
- Aparecidense
- ASA
- Azuriz
- Barcelona de Ilhéus
- Barra
- Boavista
- Brasil de Pelotas
- Capital (DF)
- Ceilândia
- Central
- Cianorte
- FC Cascavel
- Ferroviário
- GAS
- Goianésia
- Goiânia
- Goiatuba
- Guarany de Bagé
- Horizonte
- Humaitá
- Iguatu
- Imperatriz
- Independência
- Inter de Limeira
- Itabirito
- Jequié
- Joinville
- Juazeirense
- Lagarto
- Luverdense
- Manauara
- Manaus
- Maracanã
- Maranhão
- Marcílio Dias
- Maricá
- Mixto
- Monte Azul
- Nova Iguaçu
- Operário
- Parnahyba
- Penedense
- Porto Velho
- Porto Vitória
- Portuguesa (SP)
- Pouso Alegre
- Rio Branco (ES)
- Sampaio Corrêa
- Santa Cruz
- Santa Cruz de Natal
- São José (RS)
- São Luiz
- Sergipe
- Sousa
- Tocantinópolis
- Trem
- Treze
- Tuna Luso
- Uberlândia
- União (TO)

União Rondonópolis declined to participate in the Série D. They were replaced by Mixto.

The Campeonato Brasileiro Série D final was played between Barra and Santa Cruz.

27 September 2025

Santa Cruz	1–2	Barra

Arena Pernambuco, São Lourenço da Mata

4 October 2025

Barra	0–0	Santa Cruz

Arena Barra FC, Itajaí

Barra won the league after defeating Santa Cruz.

=== Promotion ===
The four best placed teams, Barra, Inter de Limeira, Maranhão and Santa Cruz, were promoted to the following year's third level.

== Super cup ==
=== Supercopa Rei ===
The 2025 Supercopa Rei was played on 2 February 2025 between Botafogo and Flamengo.

2 February 2025

Botafogo	1–3	Flamengo

Mangueirão, Belém

Flamengo won the super cup after defeating Botafogo.

== Domestic cups ==
=== Copa do Brasil ===
The 2025 Copa do Brasil started on 18 February 2025 and ended on 21 December 2025. The Copa do Brasil final was played between Corinthians and Vasco da Gama.

17 December 2025

Corinthians	0–0	Vasco da Gama

Neo Química Arena, São Paulo

21 December 2025

Vasco da Gama	1–2	Corinthians

Maracanã, Rio de Janeiro

Corinthians won the cup after defeating Vasco da Gama.

=== Copa do Nordeste ===
The competition featured 16 clubs from the Northeastern region. It started on 21 January 2025 and ended on 6 September 2025. The Copa do Nordeste final was played between Bahia and Confiança.

3 September 2025

Confiança	1–4	Bahia

Batistão, Aracaju

6 September 2025

Bahia	5–0	Confiança

Arena Fonte Nova, Salvador

Bahia won the cup after defeating Confiança.

=== Copa Verde ===
The competition featured 24 clubs from the North and Central-West regions, including two teams from Espírito Santo. It started on 22 January 2025 and ended on 23 April 2025. The Copa Verde final was played between Goiás and Paysandu.

9 April 2025

Paysandu	0–0	Goiás

Mangueirão, Belém

23 April 2025

Goiás	1–1	Paysandu
Penalties
	4–5

Estádio Serra Dourada, Goiânia

Paysandu won the cup after defeating Goiás.

== State championship champions ==
State	Champions
(Acre (state)) Acre	Independência
Alagoas	CRB
Amapá	Trem
(Amazonas (Brazilian state)) Amazonas	Amazonas
Bahia	Bahia
Ceará	Ceará
(Federal District (Brazil)) Distrito Federal	Gama
Espírito Santo	Rio Branco
Goiás	Vila Nova
Maranhão	Maranhão
Mato Grosso	Primavera
Mato Grosso do Sul	Operário
Minas Gerais	Atlético Mineiro
Pará	Remo
Paraíba	Sousa
(Paraná (state)) Paraná	Operário Ferroviário
Pernambuco	Sport
Piauí	Piauí
(Rio de Janeiro (state)) Rio de Janeiro	Flamengo
Rio Grande do Norte	América de Natal
Rio Grande do Sul	Internacional
Rondônia	Porto Velho
Roraima	GAS
(Santa Catarina (state)) Santa Catarina	Avaí
(São Paulo (state)) São Paulo	Corinthians
Sergipe	Confiança
Tocantins	Araguaína

União initially won the Campeonato Tocantinense. However, the STJD decided to deduct three points from their total in the first phase of the championship for fielding an ineligible player. As a result, they were eliminated from the semi-finals, and one semi-final and the final had to be replayed.

== State championship second division champions ==
State	Champions
(Acre (state)) Acre	Santa Cruz
Alagoas	Cruzeiro de Arapiraca
Amapá	Macapá
(Amazonas (Brazilian state)) Amazonas	Itacoatiara
Bahia	Bahia de Feira
Ceará	Maranguape
(Federal District (Brazil)) Distrito Federal	ARUC
Espírito Santo	Serra
Goiás	Anapolina
Maranhão	Luminense
Mato Grosso	Chapada
Mato Grosso do Sul	Bataguassu
Minas Gerais	North
Pará	São Raimundo
Paraíba	Confiança
(Paraná (state)) Paraná	Galo Maringá
Pernambuco	Vitória das Tabocas
Piauí	Corisabbá
(Rio de Janeiro (state)) Rio de Janeiro	Bangu
Rio Grande do Norte	QFC
Rio Grande do Sul	Novo Hamburgo
Rondônia	União Cacoalense
(Santa Catarina (state)) Santa Catarina	Carlos Renaux
(São Paulo (state)) São Paulo	Capivariano
Sergipe	Desportiva Aracaju
Tocantins	Palmas

== State championship third division champions ==
State	Champions
Ceará	Crateús
Goiás	Bom Jesus
Minas Gerais	Coimbra
Pará	Atlético Paraense
(Paraná (state)) Paraná	Prudentópolis
(Rio de Janeiro (state)) Rio de Janeiro	Serrano
Rio Grande do Sul	Guarani de Venâncio Aires
(Santa Catarina (state)) Santa Catarina	Guarani de Palhoça
(São Paulo (state)) São Paulo	Sertãozinho
Sergipe	Estanciano

== State championship fourth division champions ==
State	Champions
(Rio de Janeiro (state)) Rio de Janeiro	Goytacaz
(São Paulo (state)) São Paulo	União Barbarense

== State championship fifth division champions ==
State	Champions
(Rio de Janeiro (state)) Rio de Janeiro	Paraty
(São Paulo (state)) São Paulo	Tanabi

== State cup competition champions ==
Competition	Champions
Copa Alagoas	CSE
Copa ES	Vitória
Copa Fares Lopes	Maracanã
Copa FGF	Brasil de Pelotas
Copa Governo do Estado (SE)	Itabaiana
Copa Paulista	XV de Piracicaba
Copa Rio	Portuguesa
Copa Santa Catarina	Figueirense
Taça FPF	Cianorte

== Youth competition champions ==
Competition	Champions
Campeonato Brasileiro Sub-20	Palmeiras
Copa do Brasil Sub-20	São Paulo
Campeonato Brasileiro Sub-17	Atlético Mineiro
Copa do Brasil Sub-17	Vasco da Gama
Copa São Paulo de Futebol Júnior	São Paulo
Copa 2 de Julho Sub-15	Brazil U-15

== Brazilian clubs in international competitions ==
Team	2025 Copa Libertadores	2025 Copa Sudamericana	2025 Recopa Sudamericana	2025 FIFA Club World Cup	2025 FIFA Intercontinental Cup
Atlético Mineiro	N/A	Runners-up lost to (Argentina) Lanús	N/A	N/A	N/A
Bahia	Eliminated in the Group stage	Knockout round play-offs eliminated by (Colombia) América	N/A	N/A	N/A
Botafogo	Round of 16 eliminated by (Ecuador) LDU Quito	N/A	Runners-up lost to (Argentina) Racing	Round of 16 eliminated by (Brazil) Palmeiras	N/A
Corinthians	Third stage eliminated by (Ecuador) Barcelona	Eliminated in the Group stage	N/A	N/A	N/A
Cruzeiro	N/A	Eliminated in the Group stage	N/A	N/A	N/A
Flamengo	Champions defeated (Brazil) Palmeiras	N/A	N/A	Round of 16 eliminated by (Germany) Bayern Munich	Runners-up lost to (France) Paris Saint-Germain
Fluminense	N/A	Quarter-finals eliminated by (Argentina) Lanús	N/A	Semi-finals eliminated by (England) Chelsea	N/A
Fortaleza	Round of 16 eliminated by (Argentina) Vélez Sarsfield	N/A	N/A	N/A	N/A
Grêmio	N/A	Knockout round play-offs eliminated by (Peru) Alianza Lima	N/A	N/A	N/A
Internacional	Round of 16 eliminated by (Brazil) Flamengo	N/A	N/A	N/A	N/A
Palmeiras	Runners-up lost to (Brazil) Flamengo	N/A	N/A	Quarter-finals eliminated by (England) Chelsea	N/A
São Paulo	Quarter-finals eliminated by (Ecuador) LDU Quito	N/A	N/A	N/A	N/A
Vasco da Gama	N/A	Knockout round play-offs eliminated by (Ecuador) Independiente del Valle	N/A	N/A	N/A
Vitória	N/A	Eliminated in the Group stage	N/A	N/A	N/A

== National team ==
The following table lists all the games played by the Brazilian national team in official competitions and friendly matches during 2025.

=== Friendlies ===
10 October	South Korea	0–5	Brazil	Seoul, South Korea
20:00 UTC+9		Report	Estêvão 13', 47'; Rodrygo 41', 49'; Vinícius Júnior 77'	Stadium: Seoul World Cup Stadium; Referee: Abdulrahman Al-Jassim (Qatar)

14 October	Japan	3–2	Brazil	Chōfu, Japan
19:30 UTC+9	Minamino 52'; Nakamura 62'; Ueda 71'	Report	Paulo Henrique 26'; Gabriel Martinelli 32'	Stadium: Ajinomoto Stadium; Referee: Kim Jong-hyeok (South Korea)

15 November	Brazil	2–0	Senegal	London, England
16:00 UTC+0	Estêvão 27'; Casemiro 35'	Report		Stadium: Emirates Stadium; Referee: Jarred Gillett (England)

18 November	Brazil	1–1	Tunisia	Villeneuve-d'Ascq, France
20:30 UTC+1	Estêvão 43' (pen.)	Report	Mastouri 23'	Stadium: Stade Pierre-Mauroy; Referee: Jérôme Brisard (France)

=== 2026 FIFA World Cup qualification ===
20 March	Brazil	2–1	Colombia	Brasília, Brazil
21:45 UTC−3	Raphinha 6' (pen.); Vinícius Júnior 90+9'	Report	Díaz 41'	Stadium: Arena BRB Mané Garrincha; Attendance: 70,027; Referee: Alexis Herrera (Venezuela)

25 March	Argentina	4–1	Brazil	Buenos Aires, Argentina
21:00 UTC−3	Alvarez 4'; Fernández 12'; Mac Allister 37'; Simeone 71'	Report	Matheus Cunha 26'	Stadium: Estadio Monumental; Attendance: 85,015; Referee: Andrés Rojas (Colombia)

5 June	Ecuador	0–0	Brazil	Guayaquil, Ecuador
18:00 UTC−5		Report		Stadium: Estadio Monumental Isidro Romero Carbo; Referee: Piero Maza (Chile)

10 June	Brazil	1–0	Paraguay	São Paulo, Brazil
21:45 UTC−3	Vinícius Júnior 44'	Report		Stadium: Neo Química Arena; Referee: Facundo Tello (Argentina)

4 September	Brazil	3–0	Chile	Rio de Janeiro, Brazil
21:30 UTC−3	Estêvão 38'; Lucas Paquetá 72'; Bruno Guimarães 76'	Report		Stadium: Maracanã; Referee: Alexis Herrera (Venezuela)

9 September	Bolivia	1–0	Brazil	El Alto, Bolivia
19:30 UTC−4	Terceros 45+4' (pen.)	Report		Stadium: Estadio Municipal de El Alto; Referee: Cristian Garay (Chile)

== Women's football ==
=== Campeonato Brasileiro de Futebol Feminino Série A1 ===
The 2025 Campeonato Brasileiro de Futebol Feminino Série A1 started on 22 March 2025 and ended on 14 September 2025.

- 3B da Amazônia
- América Mineiro
- Bahia
- Corinthians
- Cruzeiro
- Ferroviária
- Flamengo
- Fluminense
- Grêmio
- Internacional
- Juventude
- Palmeiras
- Real Brasília
- Red Bull Bragantino
- São Paulo
- Sport

The Campeonato Brasileiro de Futebol Feminino Série A1 final was played between Cruzeiro and Corinthians.

7 September 2025

Cruzeiro	2–2	Corinthians

Arena Independência, Belo Horizonte

14 September 2025

Corinthians	1–0	Cruzeiro

Neo Química Arena, São Paulo

Corinthians won the league after defeating Cruzeiro.

==== Relegation ====
The two worst placed teams, Sport and 3B da Amazônia, were relegated to the following year's second level.

=== Campeonato Brasileiro de Futebol Feminino Série A2 ===
The 2025 Campeonato Brasileiro de Futebol Feminino Série A2 started on 19 April 2025 and ended on 30 August 2025.

- Ação
- Atlético Mineiro
- Avaí
- Botafogo
- Fortaleza
- Itacoatiara
- Minas Brasília
- Mixto
- Paysandu
- Remo
- Rio Negro
- Santos
- São José (SP)
- AD Taubaté
- Vasco da Gama
- Vitória

Athletico Paranaense women's section was closed. They were replaced by Rio Negro
JC Futebol Clube was renamed to Itacoatiara Futebol Clube.

The Campeonato Brasileiro de Futebol Feminino Série A2 final was played between Botafogo and Santos.

26 August 2025

Botafogo	0–1	Santos

Estádio Olímpico Nilton Santos, Rio de Janeiro

30 August 2025

Santos	1–1	Botafogo

Estádio Urbano Caldeira, Santos

Santos won the league after defeating Botafogo.

==== Promotion ====
The four best placed teams, Santos, Atlético Mineiro, Botafogo and Fortaleza, were promoted to the following year's first level.

==== Relegation ====
The two worst placed teams, São José (SP) and Remo, were relegated to the following year's third level.

=== Campeonato Brasileiro de Futebol Feminino Série A3 ===
The 2025 Campeonato Brasileiro de Futebol Feminino Série A3 started on 25 April 2025 and ended on 16 August 2025.

- Atlético de Alagoinhas
- Atlético Piauiense
- Brasil de Farroupilha
- Ceará
- Coritiba
- CRESSPOM
- Criciúma
- Doce Mel/Jequié EC
- Galvez
- Guarani de Paripueira
- IAPE
- Ipojuca
- Itabirito
- Juventude (SE)
- Manaus
- Mixto (PB)
- Operário (MS)
- Operário FC (MT)
- Pérolas Negras
- Pinda/Ferroviária
- Prosperidade
- Realidade Jovem
- Recanto
- Rolim de Moura
- São Raimundo (RR)
- Tarumã
- Toledo
- Tuna Luso
- UDA
- União (RN)
- Vila Nova/UNIVERSO
- Ypiranga (AP)

VF4 women's section was closed. They were replaced by Coritiba
Originally, 100 Limites/Araguaína (Tocantins) qualified for the Série A3. However, CBF announced that 2024 Campeonato Tocantinense Feminino did not meet the requirements as qualification tournament. CBF awarded their berth, via Women's State Ranking, to Manaus (Amazonas).

The Campeonato Brasileiro de Futebol Feminino Série A3 final was played between Vila Nova/UNIVERSO and Atlético Piauiense.

9 August 2025

Vila Nova/UNIVERSO	2–1	Atlético Piauiense

Estádio Onésio Brasileiro Alvarenga, Goiânia

16 August 2025

Atlético Piauiense	4–0	Vila Nova/UNIVERSO

Albertão, Teresina

Atlético Piauiense won the league after defeating Vila Nova/UNIVERSO.

==== Promotion ====
The four best placed teams, Doce Mel/Jequié EC, Vila Nova/UNIVERSO, Itabirito and Atlético Piauiense, were promoted to the following year's second level.

=== Super cup ===
==== Supercopa do Brasil de Futebol Feminino ====
The competition featured 8 clubs chosen between the top-twelve 2024 Série A1 and the top-four 2024 Série A2, with only one team for state. It started on 7 March 2025 and ended on 15 March 2025. The Supercopa do Brasil de Futebol Feminino final was played between São Paulo and Corinthians.

15 March 2025

São Paulo	0–0	Corinthians
Penalties
	4–3

MorumBIS, São Paulo

São Paulo won the super cup after defeating Corinthians.

=== Domestic cups ===
==== Copa do Brasil de Futebol Feminino ====
The 2025 Copa do Brasil de Futebol Feminino started on 21 May 2025 and ended on 20 November 2025. The Copa do Brasil de Futebol Feminino final was played between Ferroviária and Palmeiras.

20 November 2025

Ferroviária	2–4	Palmeiras

Fonte Luminosa, Araraquara

Palmeiras won the cup after defeating Ferroviária.

=== Domestic competition champions ===
State	Champions
(Acre (state)) Acre	Galvez
Alagoas	UDA
Amapá	Portuguesa
(Amazonas (Brazilian state)) Amazonas	3B da Amazônia
Bahia	Bahia
Ceará	Fortaleza
(Federal District (Brazil)) Distrito Federal	Minas Brasília
Espírito Santo	Prosperidade
Goiás	Vila Nova/UNIVERSO
Maranhão	Sampaio Corrêa
Mato Grosso	Ação
Mato Grosso do Sul	Pantanal
Minas Gerais	Cruzeiro
Pará	Paysandu
Paraíba	Mixto
(Paraná (state)) Paraná	Coritiba
Pernambuco	Sport
Piauí	Liga São João/Piripiri
(Rio de Janeiro (state)) Rio de Janeiro	Flamengo
Rio Grande do Norte	União
Rio Grande do Sul	Grêmio
Rondônia	Itapuense
Roraima	Rio Negro
(Santa Catarina (state)) Santa Catarina	Avaí
(São Paulo (state)) São Paulo	Palmeiras
Sergipe	Juventude
Tocantins	Paraíso

=== State cup competition champions ===
Competition	Champions
Copa Pará de Futebol Feminino	Paysandu
Copa Paulista de Futebol Feminino	Red Bull Bragantino
Copa Rio de Futebol Feminino	Flamengo

=== Youth competition champions ===
Competition	Champions
Campeonato Brasileiro de Futebol Feminino Sub-20	Botafogo
Campeonato Brasileiro de Futebol Feminino Sub-17	Corinthians
Copa São Paulo de Futebol Feminino	Flamengo

=== Brazilian clubs in international competitions ===
Team	2025 Copa Libertadores Femenina
Corinthians	Champions defeated (Colombia) Deportivo Cali
Ferroviária	Third place defeated (Chile) Colo-Colo
São Paulo	Quarter-finals eliminated by (Colombia) Deportivo Cali

=== National team ===
The following table lists all the games played by the Brazil women's national football team in official competitions and friendly matches during 2025.

The Brazil women's national football team competed in the following competitions in 2025:

==== Friendlies ====
5 April	United States	2–0	Brazil	Inglewood, United States
14:00 (PDT)	Rodman 6'; Heaps 67' (pen.)	Report		Stadium: SoFi Stadium; Attendance: 32,303; Referee: Katia Itzel García (Mexico)

8 April	United States	1–2	Brazil	San Jose, United States
19:30 (PDT)	Macario 1'	Report	Kerolin 24'; Amanda Gutierres 90+5'	Stadium: PayPal Park; Attendance: 18,000; Referee: Marianela Araya (Costa Rica)

30 May	Brazil	3–1	Japan	São Paulo, Brazil
21:30 (BRT)	Dudinha 27', 41'; Kerolin 54'	Report	Seike 88'	Stadium: Neo Química Arena; Attendance: 33,325; Referee: Roberta Echeverría (Argentina)

2 June	Brazil	2–1	Japan	Bragança Paulista, Brazil
20:00 (BRT)	Ishikawa 53' (o.g.); Jhonson 78'	Report	Seike 46'	Stadium: Estádio Cícero de Souza Marques; Attendance: 8,412; Referee: Laura Fortunato (Argentina)

27 June	France	3–2	Brazil	Grenoble, France
21:10 (CEST)	Geyoro 45', 56'; Katoto 76'	Report	Luany 7'; Kerolin 12'	Stadium: Stade des Alpes; Attendance: 13,100; Referee: Ewa Augustyn (Poland)

25 October	England	1–2	Brazil	Manchester, England
17:30 (BST)	Stanway 52' (pen.)	Report	Bia Zaneratto 9'; Dudinha 18'	Stadium: Etihad Stadium; Referee: Natalie Simon (United States)

28 October	Italy	0–1	Brazil	Parma, Italy
18:15 (CET)		Report	Luany 67'	Stadium: Stadio Ennio Tardini; Attendance: 3,800; Referee: Olivia Tschon (Austria)

28 November	Norway	3–1	Brazil	La Línea, Spain
19:00 (CET)	Gaupset 10', 52'; Hegerberg 68' (pen.)	Report	Mariza 43'	Stadium: Estadio Municipal de La Línea de la Concepción; Referee: Frederikke Lydia Søkjær (Denmark)

2 December	Portugal	0–5	Brazil	Aveiro, Portugal
19:45 (WET)		Report	Gabi Zanotti 2'; Ludmila 17'; Dudinha 37'; Belinha 74'; Bia Zaneratto 90' (pen.)	Stadium: Estádio Municipal de Aveiro; Referee: Riem Hussein (Germany)

==== 2025 Copa América Femenina ====
13 July Group B	Brazil	2–0	Venezuela	Quito, Ecuador
19:00 (ECT)	Amanda Gutierres 32'; Duda Sampaio 88'	Report		Stadium: Estadio Gonzalo Pozo Ripalda; Referee: Milagros Arruela (Peru)

16 July Group B	Bolivia	0–6	Brazil	Quito, Ecuador
16:00 (ECT)		Report	Luany 13', 32'; Kerolin 37' (pen.), 79', 83'; Amanda Gutierres 90+5'	Stadium: Estadio Gonzalo Pozo Ripalda; Referee: Roberta Echeverría (Argentina)

22 July Group B	Paraguay	1–4	Brazil	Quito, Ecuador
19:00 (ECT)	C. Martínez 65'	Report	Yasmim 27', 39'; Amanda Gutierres 60'; Duda Sampaio 75'	Stadium: Estadio Gonzalo Pozo Ripalda; Referee: Dione Rissios (Chile)

25 July Group B	Brazil	0–0	Colombia	Quito, Ecuador
19:00 (ECT)		Report		Stadium: Estadio Banco Guayaquil; Referee: Milagros Arruela (Peru)

29 July Semifinals	Brazil	5–1	Uruguay	Quito, Ecuador
19:00 (ECT)	Amanda Gutierres 11', 65'; Gio Garbelini 13'; Marta 27' (pen.); Dudinha 86'	Report	Isa Haas 51' (o.g.)	Stadium: Estadio Rodrigo Paz Delgado; Referee: Zulma Quiñónez (Paraguay)

2 August Final	Colombia	4–4 (a.e.t.) (4–5 p)	Brazil	Quito, Ecuador
16:00 (ECT)	Caicedo 25'; Tarciane 69' (o.g.); Ramírez 88'; Santos 115'	Report	Angelina 45+9' (pen.); Amanda Gutierres 80'; Marta 90+6', 105'	Stadium: Estadio Rodrigo Paz Delgado; Referee: Dione Rissios (Chile)
	Penalties
	Usme (penalty scored); Restrepo (penalty scored); Paví (penalty missed); Santos (penalty missed); Caicedo (penalty scored); Bonilla (penalty scored); Carabalí (penalty missed)		(penalty scored) Tarciane; (penalty missed) Angelina; (penalty scored) Amanda Gutierres; (penalty scored) Mariza; (penalty missed) Marta; (penalty scored) Jhonson; (penalty scored) Luany

Competition	Performance
Copa América Femenina	Champions defeated Colombia

== Attendances ==
The top 20 Brazilian football clubs with the highest average home league attendance in 2025 are listed below.

Rank	Club	Total attendance	Average attendance
1	Flamengo	1,115,913	58,732
2	Cruzeiro	837,683	44,089
3	Corinthians	761,410	40,074
4	Bahia	725,494	38,184
5	Palmeiras	663,854	34,940
6	Ceará	661,159	34,798
7	Fluminense	552,386	29,073
8	São Paulo	544,737	28,670
9	Mineiro	524,140	27,586
10	Fortaleza	514,248	27,066
11	Grêmio	486,103	25,584
12	Internacional	448,565	23,609
13	Remo	435,589	22,926
14	Vasco da Gama	423,031	22,265
15	Coritiba	421,940	22,207
16	Vitória	421,175	22,167
17	Paranaense	370,717	19,511
18	Santos	323,422	17,022
19	Botafogo	321,191	16,905
20	Recife	272,263	14,330
