= 2022 Campeonato Brasileiro de Futebol Feminino Série A3 =

2022 Brazilian soccer competition

Campeonato Brasileiro de Futebol Feminino Série A3
- Season: 2022
- Dates: 11 June – 28 August
- Champions: AD Taubaté (1st title)
- Promoted: 3B da Amazônia; Sport; AD Taubaté; Vila Nova/UNIVERSO
- Matches: 62
- Goals: 177 (2.85 per match)
- Top goalscorer: Jhonson (7 goals)
- Biggest home win: Barcelona 6–1 Rio Branco; Round of 32, 2nd leg, 18 June
- Biggest away win: CRB 1–6 VF4; Round of 32, 1st leg, 13 June
- Highest scoring: 8 goals Toledo 5–3 Coritiba/Imperial; Round of 32, 2nd leg, 19 June

The 2022 Campeonato Brasileiro de Futebol Feminino Série A3 (officially the Brasileirão Feminino Binance A-3 2022 for sponsorship reasons) was the first season of the Campeonato Brasileiro de Futebol Feminino Série A3, the third level of women's football in Brazil. The tournament was organized by CBF. It started on 11 June and ended on 28 August 2022.

The competition was contested by 32 teams, either qualified by participating in their respective state championships (27) or by the 2022 men's CBF ranking (5). The four semi-finalists, 3B da Amazônia, Sport, AD Taubaté and Vila Nova/UNIVERSO, were promoted to the 2023 Campeonato Brasileiro de Futebol Feminino Série A2.

AD Taubaté defeated 3B da Amazônia 3–2, on aggregate, in the finals to win their first title.

== Format ==
The competition was a single-elimination tournament with each round contested a home-and-away two-legged basis. The highest-ranked-federation team in the 2022 Women's State Ranking hosted the second leg. If the teams belonged to the same federation the highest-ranked team in the 2022 Women's Club Ranking would host the second leg. The first rounds were organized regionally.

If tied on aggregate, the away goals rule would not be used, extra time would not be played, and the penalty shoot-out would be used to determine the winners (Regulations Article 14).

The four semi-finalists were promoted to the 2023 Campeonato Brasileiro de Futebol Feminino Série A2.

== Teams ==
Location of teams in 2022 Série A3

=== Federation ranking ===
The number of teams from each state was chosen based on the CBF Women's State Ranking. Originally four teams would qualify via 2022 Men's Club Ranking (RNC) but as Maranhão championship was cancelled, a fifth team qualified via RNC.

Rank	Federation	Coeff.	Teams	Notes
1	(São Paulo (state)) São Paulo	69,072	2	
2	(Rio de Janeiro (state)) Rio de Janeiro	19,828	1	
3	(Santa Catarina (state)) Santa Catarina	17,112	1	
4	Rio Grande do Sul	15,892	1	+1 (RNC)
5	Bahia	15,368	1	
6	(Federal District (Brazil)) Distrito Federal	12,720	1	
7	Minas Gerais	12,684	1	
8	Pernambuco	11,344	1	+1 (RNC)
9	(Amazonas (Brazilian state)) Amazonas	9,920	1	
10	(Paraná (state)) Paraná	8,308	1	+1 (RNC)
11	Ceará	6,816	1	
12	Pará	6,124	1	
13	Goiás	5,552	1	+1 (RNC)
14	Maranhão^{[1]}	3,776	0	
15	Piauí	3,700	1	
16	Paraíba	3,548	1	
17	Alagoas	3,456	1	
18	Rondônia	3,448	1	
19	Espírito Santo	3,240	1	
20	(Acre (state)) Acre	3,192	1	
20	Mato Grosso do Sul	3,192	1	
20	Tocantins	3,192	1	
20	Rio Grande do Norte	3,192	1	
20	Amapá	3,192	1	
20	Sergipe	3,192	1	
26	Mato Grosso	2,968	1	+1 (RNC)
27	Roraima	2,280	1	

^{1} The 2021 Campeonato Maranhense Feminino was cancelled. The Maranhão berth was granted, via men's RNC, to Paraná.

=== Participating teams ===
Federation	Team	Home city	Qualification method
(Acre (state)) Acre	Rio Branco	Rio Branco	2021 Campeonato Acreano Feminino champions
Alagoas	CRB	Maceió	2021 Campeonato Alagoano Feminino champions
Amapá	Ypiranga-AP	Macapá	2021 Campeonato Amapaense Feminino champions
(Amazonas (Brazilian state)) Amazonas	3B da Amazônia	Manaus	2021 Campeonato Amazonense Feminino champions
Bahia	Doce Mel/Jequié EC	Cruz das Almas	2021 Campeonato Baiano Feminino runners-up
Ceará	Menina Olímpica	Fortaleza	2021 Campeonato Cearense Feminino 3rd place
(Federal District (Brazil)) Distrito Federal	Legião	Brasília	2021 Campeonato Brasiliense Feminino 4th place
Espírito Santo	Vila Nova-ES	Vila Velha	2021 Campeonato Capixaba Feminino champions
Goiás	Vila Nova/UNIVERSO	Goiânia	2021 Campeonato Goiano Feminino champions
Goiás	Atlético Goianiense	Goiânia	best placed team in the 2022 Men´s CBF ranking not already qualified
Mato Grosso	Mixto	Cuiabá	2021 Campeonato Mato-Grossense Feminino champions
Mato Grosso	Cuiabá	Cuiabá	3rd best placed team in the 2022 Men´s CBF ranking not already qualified
Mato Grosso do Sul	Operário	Campo Grande	2021 Campeonato Sul-Mato-Grossense Feminino champions
Minas Gerais	Ipatinga	Ipatinga	2021 Campeonato Mineiro Feminino 4th place
Pará	Remo	Belém	2021 Campeonato Paraense Feminino champions
Paraíba	VF4	João Pessoa	2021 Campeonato Paraibano Feminino champions
(Paraná (state)) Paraná	Toledo	Toledo	2021 Campeonato Paranaense Feminino runners-up
(Paraná (state)) Paraná	Coritiba/Imperial^{[a]}	Curitiba	5th best placed team in the 2022 Men´s CBF ranking not already qualified
Pernambuco	Náutico	Recife	2021 Campeonato Pernambucano Feminino champions
Pernambuco	Sport	Recife	2nd best placed team in the 2022 Men´s CBF ranking not already qualified
Piauí	Abelhas Rainhas^{[b]}	Picos	2021 Campeonato Piauiense Feminino runners-up
(Rio de Janeiro (state)) Rio de Janeiro	Cabofriense	Cabo Frio	2021 Campeonato Carioca Feminino 5th place
Rio Grande do Norte	União/ABC	Extremoz/Natal	2021 Campeonato Potiguar Feminino champions
Rio Grande do Sul	Flamengo de São Pedro	Tenente Portela	2021 Campeonato Gaúcho Feminino 3rd place
Rio Grande do Sul	Juventude^{[c]}	Caxias do Sul	4th best placed team in the 2022 Men´s CBF ranking not already qualified
Rondônia	Barcelona	Vilhena	2021 Campeonato Rondoniense Feminino runners-up
Roraima	São Raimundo	Boa Vista	2021 Campeonato Roraimense Feminino champions
(Santa Catarina (state)) Santa Catarina	Criciúma	Criciúma	2021 Campeonato Catarinense Feminino runners-up
(São Paulo (state)) São Paulo	AD Taubaté	Taubaté	2021 Campeonato Paulista Feminino 8th place
(São Paulo (state)) São Paulo	Realidade Jovem	São José do Rio Preto	2021 Campeonato Paulista Feminino 9th place
Sergipe	Estanciano	Estância	2021 Campeonato Sergipano Feminino champions
Tocantins	Paraíso	Paraíso do Tocantins	2021 Campeonato Tocantinense Feminino champions

^{a} As the 2021 Campeonato Maranhense Feminino was not played, the Maranhão berth was granted to Vitória via 2022 Men´s CBF ranking. However they did not confirm their participation before the deadline and were excluded. Finally the berth was granted to Coritiba/Imperial.
^{b} Teresina (2021 Campeonato Piauiense Feminino champions) declined to participate in the Série A3. They were replaced by the runners-up Abelhas Rainhas.
^{c} Chapecoense qualified for the Série A3 via 2022 Men´s CBF ranking but declined to participate. They were replaced by Juventude.

== Round of 32 ==
The matches were played from 11 to 26 June 2022.

=== Matches ===
Team 1	Agg.	Team 2	1st leg	2nd leg
Realidade Jovem (São Paulo (state))	1–4	(São Paulo (state)) AD Taubaté	0–2	1–2
Vila Nova-ES (Espírito Santo)	3–1	(Rio de Janeiro (state)) Cabofriense	1–1	2–0
Ipatinga (Minas Gerais)	4–3	(Santa Catarina (state)) Criciúma	3–1	1–2
Juventude (Rio Grande do Sul)	1–5	(Rio Grande do Sul) Flamengo de São Pedro	1–2	0–3
Operário (Mato Grosso do Sul)	0–6	(Federal District (Brazil)) Legião	0–2	0–4
Coritiba/Imperial (Paraná (state))	4–8	(Paraná (state)) Toledo	1–3	3–5
Vila Nova/UNIVERSO (Goiás)	3–2	(Goiás) Atlético Goianiense	2–0	1–2
Cuiabá (Mato Grosso)	2–5	(Mato Grosso) Mixto	1–1	1–4
Estanciano (Sergipe)	2–4	(Bahia) Doce Mel/Jequié EC	2–1	0–3
Náutico (Pernambuco)	1–4	(Pernambuco) Sport	1–1	0–3
CRB (Alagoas)	2–9	(Paraíba) VF4	1–6	1–3
União/ABC (Rio Grande do Norte)	4–1	(Ceará) Menina Olímpica	4–0	0–1
Paraíso (Tocantins)	4–2	(Piauí) Abelhas Rainhas	2–1	2–1
Ypiranga-AP (Amapá)	4–3	(Pará) Remo	2–1	2–2
São Raimundo (Roraima)	2–5	(Amazonas (Brazilian state)) 3B da Amazônia	2–2	0–3
Rio Branco (Acre (state))	1–10	(Rondônia) Barcelona	0–4	1–6

== Round of 16 ==
The matches were played from 2 to 10 July 2022.

=== Matches ===
Team 1	Agg.	Team 2	1st leg	2nd leg
Vila Nova-ES (Espírito Santo)	2–5	(São Paulo (state)) AD Taubaté	1–2	1–3
Ipatinga (Minas Gerais)	3–1	(Rio Grande do Sul) Flamengo de São Pedro	2–0	1–1
Toledo (Paraná (state))	4–3	(Federal District (Brazil)) Legião	2–1	2–2
Mixto (Mato Grosso)	2–3	(Goiás) Vila Nova/UNIVERSO	0–1	2–2
Sport (Pernambuco)	2–1	(Bahia) Doce Mel/Jequié EC	1–0	1–1
União/ABC (Rio Grande do Norte)	1–3	(Paraíba) VF4	0–1	1–2
Ypiranga-AP (Amapá)	0–0 (8–7 p)	(Tocantins) Paraíso	0–0	0–0
Barcelona (Rondônia)	1–4	(Amazonas (Brazilian state)) 3B da Amazônia	0–1	1–3

== Quarter-finals ==
The matches were played from 16 to 24 July 2022.

=== Matches ===
Team 1	Agg.	Team 2	1st leg	2nd leg
Ipatinga (Minas Gerais)	1–4	(São Paulo (state)) AD Taubaté	0–3	1–1
Vila Nova/UNIVERSO (Goiás)	3–2	(Paraná (state)) Toledo	2–0	1–2
VF4 (Paraíba)	2–4	(Pernambuco) Sport	0–2	2–2
Ypiranga-AP (Amapá)	0–2	(Amazonas (Brazilian state)) 3B da Amazônia	0–1	0–1

== Semi-finals ==
The matches were played from 6 to 14 August 2022.

=== Matches ===
Team 1	Agg.	Team 2	1st leg	2nd leg
Vila Nova/UNIVERSO (Goiás)	0–3	(São Paulo (state)) AD Taubaté	0–1	0–2
3B da Amazônia (Amazonas (Brazilian state))	4–2	(Pernambuco) Sport	2–0	2–2

== Finals ==
The matches were played on 20 and 28 August 2022.

=== Matches ===
Team 1	Agg.	Team 2	1st leg	2nd leg
3B da Amazônia (Amazonas (Brazilian state))	2–3	(São Paulo (state)) AD Taubaté	2–0	0–3

20 August 2022
16:00

3B da Amazônia (Amazonas (Brazilian state))	2–0	(São Paulo (state)) AD Taubaté
Karol Cardozo 49'; Paulinha 66'	Report

Estádio Ismael Benigno, Manaus
Referee: Elaine da Silva Melo (Pará)

28 August 2022
15:00

AD Taubaté (São Paulo (state))	3–0	(Amazonas (Brazilian state)) 3B da Amazônia
Bárbara Santos 13'; Baiana 44' (pen.); Keke 49'	Report

Joaquinzão, Taubaté
Referee: Francielly Fernanda Lima de Castro (Minas Gerais)

== Top goalscorers ==
Rank	Player	Team	Goals
1	Jhonson	(Paraná (state)) Toledo	7
2	Aline Rosa	(São Paulo (state)) AD Taubaté	5
3	Ana Keyla	(Federal District (Brazil)) Legião	4
3	Bia	(Mato Grosso) Mixto	4
3	Cacá	(São Paulo (state)) AD Taubaté	4
3	Larissa Santos	(Amazonas (Brazilian state)) 3B da Amazônia	4
3	Layza	(Pernambuco) Sport	4
3	Letícia Nunes	(Minas Gerais) Ipatinga	4
3	Lu Meireles	(Paraíba) VF4	4

Source: CBF
