= CBF ranking =

Brazilian football rankings

The CBF Rankings are football rankings produced by the CBF, the Brazilian Football Confederation. The Ranking Nacional de Federações determines how many berths each state federation receives in Copa do Brasil, Campeonato Brasileiro Série D, Copa do Nordeste and Copa Verde. The Ranking Nacional de Clubes is a ranking of clubs and is used to determine the allocation of clubs in the pots for the draws of Copa do Brasil and Copa do Nordeste as well as was used until 2023 to determine the 10 extra participants of Copa do Brasil.

== Criteria for awarding points ==
Points are awarded to clubs on the basis of performances in various competitions.

=== Points for Campeonato Brasileiro ===
Série A

Place	Points
1	800
2	640
3	600
4	560
5	552
...	..
23	408
24...	408

Série B

Place	Points
1	400
2	320
3	300
4	280
5	276
...	..
23	204
24...	204

Série C

Place	Points
1	200
2	160
3	150
4	140
5	138
...	..
23	102
24...	102

Série D

Place	Points
1	100
2	80
3	75
4	70
5	69
...	..
23	51
24...	51
...	..
65	10
66...	10

Note: For 2020 and 2021 only, the teams eliminated in the Pré-Série D (65th through 68th places) received 10 points. The 65th through 68th places in other years also received 51 points.

=== Points for Copa do Brasil ===
Phase	Points
Champions	600
Runners-up	480
Semi-finalists	450
Quarter-finalists	400
Round of 16	200
4th stage	100
3rd stage	50
2nd stage	25
1st stage	15

=== Points for participants of Copa Libertadores up to 2012 ===
Phase	Points
Participants	400

Note: Up to 2012 clubs taking part of Copa Libertadores could not participate of Copa do Brasil of the same year.

=== Points for the champion of Copa Sudamericana up to 2016 ===
Phase	Points
Champions	280

Note: Up to 2016 The Copa Sudamericana champions automatically qualified to the next year edition of the competition, making them unable to take part in the next edition of Copa do Brasil.

== 2026 Club Ranking ==
Last update: 23 December 2025

Rank	Club	Points	State
1	Flamengo	16,314	(Rio de Janeiro (state))
2	Corinthians	14.489	(São Paulo (state))
3	Palmeiras	13,860	(São Paulo (state))
4	Atlético Mineiro	13,696	(Minas Gerais)
5	São Paulo	13,556	(São Paulo (state))
6	Fluminense	13,006	(Rio de Janeiro (state))
7	Botafogo	12,834	(Rio de Janeiro (state))
8	Athletico Paranaense	12,656	(Paraná (state))
9	Bahia	12,632	(Bahia)
10	Vasco da Gama	11,330	(Rio de Janeiro (state))
11	Cruzeiro	11,010	(Minas Gerais)
12	Grêmio	10,636	(Rio Grande do Sul)
13	Fortaleza	10,382	(Ceará)
14	Internacional	10,014	(Rio Grande do Sul)
15	Red Bull Bragantino	9,802	(São Paulo (state))
16	Santos	8,852	(São Paulo (state))
17	Juventude	8,426	(Rio Grande do Sul)
18	Atlético Goianiense	7,476	(Goiás)
19	América Mineiro	7,429	(Minas Gerais)
20	Vitória	8,160	(Bahia)

== 2026 State Ranking ==
Last update:23 December 2025

Rank	State	Coeff.	Série A	Série B	Série C	Série D	Total
1	(São Paulo (state)) São Paulo	93,528	6	4	4	5	19
2	(Rio de Janeiro (state)) Rio de Janeiro	61,308	4	0	1	6	11
3	Minas Gerais	41,451	2	2	0	5	9
4	Rio Grande do Sul	39,283	2	1	2	4	9
5	(Paraná (state)) Paraná	31,792	2	2	1	4	9
6	Ceará	24,954	0	2	1	5	8
7	Goiás	24,148	0	3	1	5	9
8	(Santa Catarina (state)) Santa Catarina	23,938	1	2	3	4	10
9	Bahia	23,642	2	0	0	4	6
10	Pernambuco	14,158	0	2	1	4	7
11	Alagoas	12,240	0	1	0	3	4
12	Pará	10,710	1	0	1	2	4
13	Mato Grosso	9,346	0	1	0	5	6
14	(Amazonas (Brazilian state)) Amazonas	6,688	0	0	1	3	4
15	Rio Grande do Norte	6,131	0	0	0	3	3
16	Paraíba	5,507	0	0	1	3	4
17	Maranhão	5,451	0	0	1	4	5
18	Sergipe	5,082	0	0	2	2	4
19	(Federal District (Brazil)) Distrito Federal	3,633	0	0	0	4	4
20	Piauí	3,545	0	0	0	4	4
21	Espírito Santo	2,623	0	0	0	3	3
22	Tocantins	2,435	0	0	0	2	2
23	(Acre (state)) Acre	2,306	0	0	0	3	3
24	Rondônia	1,648	0	0	0	2	2
25	Roraima	1,598	0	0	0	3	3
26	Mato Grosso do Sul	1,450	0	0	0	2	2
27	Amapá	1,375	0	0	0	2	2

Key to colors on the table
6 berths in Copa do Brasil
5 berths in Copa do Brasil
4 berths in Copa do Brasil
3 berth in Copa do Brasil

== 2026 Women's Club Ranking ==
Last update: 4 December 2025

Rank	Club	State	Points
1	Corinthians	(São Paulo (state))	14,000
2	Palmeiras	(São Paulo (state))	11,536
3	São Paulo	(São Paulo (state))	11,162
4	Ferroviária	(São Paulo (state))	11,112
5	Internacional	(Rio Grande do Sul)	10,072
6	Red Bull Bragantino	(São Paulo (state))	9,296
7	Flamengo	(Rio de Janeiro (state))	9,080
8	Bahia	(Bahia)	9,018
9	Cruzeiro	(Minas Gerais)	8,988
10	Grêmio	(Rio Grande do Sul)	8,348
11	Real Brasília	(Federal District (Brazil))	8,052
12	Santos	(São Paulo (state))	7,804
13	Fluminense	(Rio de Janeiro (state))	7,296
14	América Mineiro	(Minas Gerais)	7,272
15	Avaí/Kindermann	(Santa Catarina (state))	6,716
16	Sport	(Pernambuco)	6,696
17	Atlético Mineiro	(Minas Gerais)	6,072
18	Botafogo	(Rio de Janeiro (state))	5,992
19	Juventude	(Rio Grande do Sul)	5,262
20	3B da Amazônia	(Amazonas (Brazilian state))	5,252

== 2026 Women's State Ranking ==
Last update:4 December 2025

Rank	State	Coeff.
1	(São Paulo (state)) São Paulo	78,150
2	(Rio de Janeiro (state)) Rio de Janeiro	27,524
3	Rio Grande do Sul	25,752
4	Minas Gerais	24,432
5	(Federal District (Brazil)) Distrito Federal	16,875
6	Bahia	16,806
7	(Amazonas (Brazilian state)) Amazonas	14,646
8	(Santa Catarina (state)) Santa Catarina	9,255
9	Ceará	8,985
10	Pernambuco	8,732
11	Pará	8,494
12	Mato Grosso	6,969
13	(Paraná (state)) Paraná	6,633
14	Alagoas	5,050
15	Paraíba	5,025
16	Goiás	4,347
17	Rondônia	3,892
18	Roraima	3,423
19	Piauí	3,246
20	Maranhão	2,469
21	Mato Grosso do Sul	2.344
22	Amapá	2,104
23	Sergipe	2,036
24	Espírito Santo	2,004
25	(Acre (state)) Acre	1,983
26	Rio Grande do Norte	1,667
27	Tocantins	1,407
