= Campeonato Paraense de Futebol Feminino =

Women's football league in Pará, Brazil

- Founded: 1983
- Country: Brazil
- Confederation: FPF
- Promotion to: Brasileiro Série A3
- Current champions: Paysandu (4th title) (2025)
- Most championships: ESMAC; Independente (6 titles each)
- Current: 2026

The Campeonato Paraense de Futebol Feminino is the women's football state championship of Pará state, and is contested since 1983.

== List of champions ==
Following is the list with all recognized titles of Campeonato Paraense Feminino:

Season	Champions	Runners-up
1983	Remo (1)	Paysandu
1984	Paysandu (1)	
1985	Paysandu (2)	
1986	Paysandu (3)	
1987–1998	Not held	
1999	Independente (1)	
2000	Independente (2)	
2001	Independente (3)	
2002	Independente (4)	
2003	Independente (5)	
2004–2006	Not held	
2007	Independente (6)	
2008	Sacramenta (1)	Estrela/Barcarena
2009	Pinheirense (1)	Tuna Luso
2010	Pinheirense (2)	Tuna Luso
2011	Tuna Luso (1)	Pinheirense
2012	ESMAC (1)	Tuna Luso
2013	Tuna Luso (2)	ESMAC
2014	Tuna Luso (3)	ESMAC
2015	Pinheirense (3)	ESMAC
2016	ESMAC (2)	Paysandu
2017	ESMAC (3)	Pinheirense
2018	ESMAC (4)	Pinheirense
2019	ESMAC (5)	Remo
2020	ESMAC (6)	Paysandu
2021	Remo (2)	Gavião Kyikatejê
2022	Remo (3)	Paysandu
2023	Remo (4)	Paysandu
2024	Tuna Luso (4)	Paysandu
2025	Paysandu (4)	Tiradentes

== Titles by team ==
Teams in bold stills active.

Rank	Club	Winners	Winning years
1	**ESMAC**	6	2012, 2016, 2017, 2018, 2019, 2020
1	**Independente**	6	1999, 2000, 2001, 2002, 2003, 2007
3	**Remo**	4	1983, 2021, 2022, 2023
3	**Tuna Luso**	4	2011, 2013, 2014, 2024
3	**Paysandu**	4	1984, 1985, 1986, 2025
6	**Pinheirense**	3	2009, 2010, 2015
7	Sacramenta	1	2008

=== By city ===
City	Championships	Clubs
Belém	16	Remo (4), Tuna Luso (4), Paysandu (4), Pinheirense (3), Sacramenta (1)
Ananindeua	6	ESMAC (6)
Tucuruí	6	Independente (6)
