= 2022 Campeonato Brasileiro de Futebol Feminino Série A2 =

2022 Brazilian soccer competition

Campeonato Brasileiro de Futebol Feminino Série A2
- Season: 2022
- Dates: 11 June – 17 September
- Champions: Ceará (1st title)
- Promoted: Athletico Paranaense; Bahia; Ceará; Real Ariquemes
- Relegated: Aliança/Goiás; CEFAMA; Iranduba; Vasco da Gama
- Matches played: 62
- Goals scored: 168 (2.71 per match)
- Top goalscorer: Michele Carioca (7 goals)
- Biggest home win: Athletico Paranaense 6–0 América Mineiro; Group A, R1, 11 June
- Biggest away win: CEFAMA 0–6 JC; Group D, R4, 9 July
- Highest scoring: 7 goals Athletico Paranaense 6–1 Aliança/Goiás; Group A, R3, 1 July

The 2022 Campeonato Brasileiro de Futebol Feminino Série A2 (officially the Brasileirão Feminino Binance A-2 2022 for sponsorship reasons) was the 6th season of the Campeonato Brasileiro de Futebol Feminino Série A2, the second level of women's football in Brazil. The tournament was organized by CBF. It started on 11 June and ended on 17 September 2022.

Sixteen teams competed in the tournament. Twelve returning from the 2021 Série A2 and four relegated from the 2021 Série A1 (Bahia, Botafogo, Minas/ICESP and Napoli). As Napoli were disbanded, they were replaced by CEFAMA

The four semi-finalists, Athletico Paranaense, Bahia, Ceará and Real Ariquemes, were promoted to the 2023 Série A1, while Aliança/Goiás, CEFAMA, Iranduba and Vasco da Gama were relegated to the 2023 Série A3.

Tied 2–2 on aggregate, Ceará defeated Athletico Paranaense 3–1 on penalties in the finals to win their first title.

== Format ==
In the group stage, the 16 teams were divided into four groups of four organized regionally. Top two teams qualified for the quarter-finals. From the quarter-finals on the competition was played as a knock-out tournament with each round contested over two legs.

== Teams ==
Location of teams in 2022 Série A2

=== Number of teams by state ===
Number of teams	State	Team(s)
3	Rio de Janeiro	Botafogo, Fluminense and Vasco da Gama
2	Amazonas	Iranduba and JC
2	Ceará	Ceará and Fortaleza
1	Alagoas	UDA
1	Bahia	Bahia
1	Distrito Federal	Minas/ICESP
1	Goiás	Aliança/Goiás
1	Maranhão	CEFAMA
1	Minas Gerais	América Mineiro
1	Paraíba	Botafogo-PB
1	Paraná	Athletico Paranaense
1	Rondônia	Real Ariquemes

== Stadiums and locations ==
Team	Location	Stadium	Capacity
Aliança/Goiás	Goiânia	Olímpico Pedro Ludovico	13,500
(Minas Gerais) América Mineiro	Belo Horizonte	SESC Venda Nova	1,400
(Paraná (state)) Athletico Paranaense	Curitiba	CT do Caju	3,000
(Paraná (state)) Athletico Paranaense	Curitiba	Arena da Baixada	42,372
Bahia	Salvador	CT Evaristo de Macedo (Camaçari)	1,000
Bahia	Salvador	Arena Fonte Nova	50,025
(Rio de Janeiro (state)) Botafogo	Rio de Janeiro	Giulite Coutinho (Mesquita)	13,544
(Rio de Janeiro (state)) Botafogo	Rio de Janeiro	Olímpico Nilton Santos	46,931
(Paraíba) Botafogo-PB	João Pessoa	Almeidão	19,000
Ceará	Fortaleza	CT Cidade Vozão (Itaitinga)	4,000
Ceará	Fortaleza	Presidente Vargas	20,262
(Maranhão) CEFAMA	São José de Ribamar	Nhozinho Santos	11,429
(Rio de Janeiro (state)) Fluminense	Rio de Janeiro	Estádio das Laranjeiras	2,000
(Ceará) Fortaleza	Fortaleza	CT Ribamar Bezerra (Maracanaú)	1,000
(Amazonas (Brazilian state)) Iranduba	Iranduba	Ismael Benigno (Manaus)	10,451
(Amazonas (Brazilian state)) Iranduba	Iranduba	Municipal Carlos Zamith (Manaus)	5,000
(Amazonas (Brazilian state)) JC	Itacoatiara	Floro de Mendonça	5,000
(Federal District (Brazil)) Minas/ICESP	Brasília	Ciro Machado do Espírito Santo	1,500
(Rondônia) Real Ariquemes	Ariquemes	Gentil Valério	2,500
(Alagoas) UDA	Maceió	Estádio da UFAL	2,213
(Rio de Janeiro (state)) Vasco da Gama	Rio de Janeiro	Nivaldo Pereira (Nova Iguaçu)	2,184
(Rio de Janeiro (state)) Vasco da Gama	Rio de Janeiro	São Januário	24,584

== Group stage ==
In the group stage, each group was played on a home-and-away round-robin basis. The teams were ranked according to points (3 points for a win, 1 point for a draw, and 0 points for a loss). If tied on points, the following criteria would be used to determine the ranking: 1. Wins; 2. Goal difference; 3. Goals scored; 4. Fewest red cards; 5. Fewest yellow cards; 6. Draw in the headquarters of the Brazilian Football Confederation (Regulations Article 15).

The top two teams qualified for the quarter-finals, while the four teams with the lowest number of points, regardless of the group, were relegated to the 2023 Série A3.

=== Group A ===
Pos	Team	Pld	W	D	L	GF	GA	GD	Pts	Qualification	ATH	MIN	AME	ALI
1	Athletico Paranaense	6	4	1	1	19	4	+15	13	Advance to quarter-finals		0–1	6–0	6–1
2	Minas/ICESP	6	4	1	1	5	2	+3	13	Advance to quarter-finals	0–0		2–1	1–0
3	América Mineiro	6	3	0	3	8	13	−5	9		1–3	1–0		3–1
4	Aliança/Goiás	6	0	0	6	4	17	−13	0	Relegation to Série A3	1–4	0–1	1–2	

Source: CBF
Rules for classification: 1) points; 2) wins; 3) goal difference; 4) goals scored; 5) fewest red cards; 6) fewest yellow cards; 7) draw.

=== Group B ===
Pos	Team	Pld	W	D	L	GF	GA	GD	Pts	Qualification	BAH	BOT	FLU	VAS
1	Bahia	6	4	1	1	10	4	+6	13	Advance to quarter-finals		1–0	4–2	1–1
2	Botafogo	6	3	2	1	7	4	+3	11	Advance to quarter-finals	1–0		0–0	2–2
3	Fluminense	6	1	2	3	5	9	−4	5		0–2	0–2		2–0
4	Vasco da Gama	6	0	3	3	5	10	−5	3	Relegation to Série A3	0–2	1–2	1–1	

Source: CBF
Rules for classification: 1) points; 2) wins; 3) goal difference; 4) goals scored; 5) fewest red cards; 6) fewest yellow cards; 7) draw.

=== Group C ===
Pos	Team	Pld	W	D	L	GF	GA	GD	Pts	Qualification	CEA	FOR	UDA	BPB
1	Ceará	6	4	2	0	16	4	+12	14	Advance to quarter-finals		2–1	4–0	1–1
2	Fortaleza	6	2	2	2	7	5	+2	8	Advance to quarter-finals	2–2		0–0	3–0
3	UDA	6	2	1	3	2	7	−5	7		0–2	1–0		0–1
4	Botafogo-PB	6	1	1	4	2	11	−9	4		0–5	0–1	0–1	

Source: CBF
Rules for classification: 1) points; 2) wins; 3) goal difference; 4) goals scored; 5) fewest red cards; 6) fewest yellow cards; 7) draw.

=== Group D ===
Pos	Team	Pld	W	D	L	GF	GA	GD	Pts	Qualification	REA	JCF	IRA	CEF
1	Real Ariquemes	6	6	0	0	17	5	+12	18	Advance to quarter-finals		2–1	1–0	2–1
2	JC	6	4	0	2	20	6	+14	12	Advance to quarter-finals	2–3		5–1	5–0
3	Iranduba	6	0	2	4	4	14	−10	2	Relegation to Série A3	1–5	0–1		2–2
4	CEFAMA	6	0	2	4	3	19	−16	2	Relegation to Série A3	0–4	0–6	0–0	

Source: CBF
Rules for classification: 1) points; 2) wins; 3) goal difference; 4) goals scored; 5) fewest red cards; 6) fewest yellow cards; 7) draw.

== Final stages ==
The final stages were played on a home-and-away two-legged basis. If tied on aggregate, the away goals rule would not be used, extra time would not be played, and the penalty shoot-out would be used to determine the winners (Regulations Article 16). For the semi-finals and finals, the best-overall-performance team hosted the second leg.

The four quarter-finals winners were promoted to 2023 Série A1.

=== Quarter-finals ===
The matches were played from 6 to 13 August 2022.

==== Matches ====
Team 1	Agg.	Team 2	1st leg	2nd leg
Botafogo (Rio de Janeiro (state))	3–3 (2–4 p)	(Paraná (state)) Athletico Paranaense	2–1	1–2
Minas/ICESP (Federal District (Brazil))	1–2	Bahia	0–1	1–1
JC (Amazonas (Brazilian state))	3–8	Ceará	2–4	1–4
Fortaleza (Ceará)	0–1	(Rondônia) Real Ariquemes	0–1	0–0

=== Semi-finals ===
The matches were played from 20 to 27 August 2022.

==== Matches ====
Team 1	Agg.	Team 2	1st leg	2nd leg
Athletico Paranaense (Paraná (state))	2–2 (3–2 p)	Bahia	1–1	1–1
Ceará	3–2	(Rondônia) Real Ariquemes	1–0	2–2

=== Finals ===
The matches were played on 10 and 17 September 2022.

==== Matches ====
Team 1	Agg.	Team 2	1st leg	2nd leg
Athletico Paranaense (Paraná (state))	2–2 (1–3 p)	Ceará	2–0	0–2

10 September 2022
15:00

Athletico Paranaense (Paraná (state))	2–0	Ceará
Milena Monteiro 16' (pen.); Solange 26'	Report

Arena da Baixada, Curitiba
Attendance: 28,447
Referee: Andreza Helena de Siqueira (Minas Gerais)

17 September 2022
15:00

Ceará	2–0	(Paraná (state)) Athletico Paranaense
Flávia Pissaia 14'; Jullyana Morais 71'	Report
Penalties
Nath Pitbull (penalty scored); Taciana Ceará (penalty scored); Edna Baiana (penalty missed); Emily (penalty scored)	3–1	(penalty missed) Tainá; (penalty missed) Eddie; (penalty scored) Duda Tosti; (penalty missed) Solange

Estádio Presidente Vargas, Fortaleza
Attendance: 7,071
Referee: Rejane Caetano da Silva (Rio de Janeiro)

== Top goalscorers ==
Rank	Player	Team	Goals
1	Michele Carioca	Ceará	7
2	Solange	(Paraná (state)) Athletico Paranaense	6
3	Gabrielle Itacaré	Bahia	5
3	Gi	(Amazonas (Brazilian state)) JC	5
3	Késia	(Rondônia) Real Ariquemes	5
3	Letícia Pires	(Paraná (state)) Athletico Paranaense	5
3	Milena Monteiro	(Paraná (state)) Athletico Paranaense	5

Source: CBF
