= Jerson Testoni =

Brazilian footballer and manager

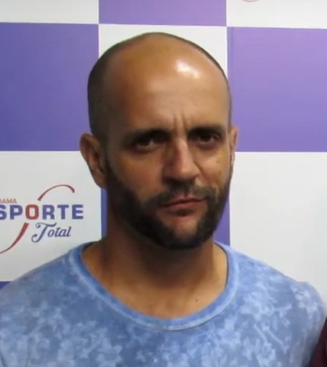
- Testoni in 2020

Personal information
- Full name: Jerson Testoni
- Date of birth: 18 June 1980 (age 46)
- Place of birth: Gaspar, Brazil
- Position: Left back

Team information
- Current team: Atlético Piauiense (head coach)

Youth career
- Tupi de Gaspar

Senior career*
Years	Team	Apps	(Gls)
1997–2000	Brusque		
2000–2002	Criciúma	14	(0)
2003	Gama		
2004	Villa Nova		
2004	Francana		
2005	Botafogo-SP		
2005	Joinville		
2006	XV de Piracicaba		
2007	Hermann Aichinger		
2007–2008	Marcílio Dias		
2008	Brasil de Farroupilha		
2009	Atlético Ibirama		
2009–2010	Imbituba		

Managerial career
- 2014–2015: Hermann Aichinger (assistant)
- 2016: Brusque U17
- 2016–2017: Brusque (assistant)
- 2017: Brusque
- 2018: Joinville U15
- 2019: Joinville U17
- 2019: Brusque (assistant)
- 2019–2021: Brusque
- 2021–2022: Brasil de Pelotas
- 2022: Joinville
- 2023: Altos
- 2023–2024: Ypiranga-RS
- 2024–2025: Cianorte
- 2025: Altos
- 2026: Atlético Piauiense
- 2026: Maranhão
- 2027–: Atlético Piauiense
- * Club domestic league appearances and goals

Jerson Testoni (born 18 June 1980), known simply as Jersinho as a player, is a Brazilian professional football coach and former player who played as a left back. He is the current head coach of Atlético Piauiense.

== Honours ==
=== Player ===
Imbituba

- Campeonato Catarinense Divisão Especial: 2009

=== Manager ===
Brusque

- Copa Santa Catarina: 2019
- Recopa Catarinense: 2020
