= Jhonson =

Brazilian footballer (born 2005)

Personal information
- Full name: Ingrid Aparecida Borges de Morais
- Date of birth: 13 October 2005 (age 21)
- Place of birth: Suzano, Brazil
- Height: 1.74 m (5 ft 9 in)
- Position: Forward

Team information
- Current team: Corinthians
- Number: 40

Youth career
- Toledo
- 2020–2021: → Coritiba (loan)
- 2023: → Corinthians (loan)

Senior career*
Years	Team	Apps	(Gls)
2020–2024	Toledo	13	(12)
2023–2024	→ Corinthians (loan)	4	(5)
2025–	Corinthians	36	(14)

International career^{‡}
2022	Brazil U17	11	(10)
2025–	Brazil	1	(1)
Medal record
Women's football
Representing Brazil
Copa América Femenina
Gold medal – first place	2025 Ecuador
- * Club domestic league appearances and goals as of 14:33, 29 April 2026 (UTC) ‡ National team caps and goals as of 17:50, 3 June (UTC)

Ingrid Aparecida Borges de Morais (born 13 October 2005), commonly known as Jhonson, is a Brazilian professional footballer who plays as a forward for Corinthians.

== Club career ==
=== Early career ===
Born in Londrina, Paraná, Jhonson began her career playing futsal in her hometown. Nicknamed only "Jhon" at that time, she then moved to the youth sides of Toledo, where she was then nicknamed "Jhonson" by club president Jaime Leal.

After making her senior debut with Toledo in 2020, Jhonson also played for the under-18 side of Coritiba in that year, after both clubs established a partnership. The partnership ended in the following year, and she renewed her contract with the club in the end of 2021 before becoming the top scorer of the 2022 Campeonato Brasileiro Série A3 with seven goals.

=== Corinthians ===
On 30 January 2023, Jhonson was loaned to Corinthians for two years, initially for the under-20 squad. She made her first team debut for the side on 8 June, coming on as a substitute and scoring the club's eleventh goal in a 11–0 Campeonato Paulista home routing of Realidade Jovem.

Definitely promoted to the main squad for the 2024 season, Jhonson suffered a knee injury in February which sidelined her for six months. On her first match back to action, she scored a hat-trick in a 5–0 away routing of Marília on 25 September.

On 11 December 2024, Jhonson signed a permanent four-year contract with Timão, after the club exercise the buyout clause on her contract.

== International career ==
Jhonson represented Brazil at under-17 level in the 2022 South American U-17 Women's Championship, being the top scorer of the tournament with nine goals in seven matches. In that year, she also appeared in the 2022 FIFA U-17 Women's World Cup.

In February 2023, Jhonson was called up to the under-20 team, but had to withdraw due to injury. On 13 May 2025, she received her first call-up to the full side by head coach Arthur Elias, for two friendlies against Japan.

== Honours ==
Corinthians

- Campeonato Brasileiro de Futebol Feminino Série A1: 2024
- Campeonato Paulista de Futebol Feminino: 2023

Brazil U17

- South American Under-17 Women's Football Championship: 2022
