= Estádio Castor Cifuentes =

Football stadium Nova Lima, Brazil

Coordinates: 19°59′15″S 43°50′41″W

Estádio Municipal Castor Cifuentes
- Alçapão do Bonfim; Penidão
- Interactive map of Estádio Municipal Castor Cifuentes
- Location: Nova Lima, Brazil
- Owner: Municipality of Nova Lima
- Capacity: 15,000
- Surface: Grass
- Field size: 100 x 66 m

Construction
- Opened: 1930
- Renovated: 15 October 1989

Tenant
- Villa Nova Atlético Clube

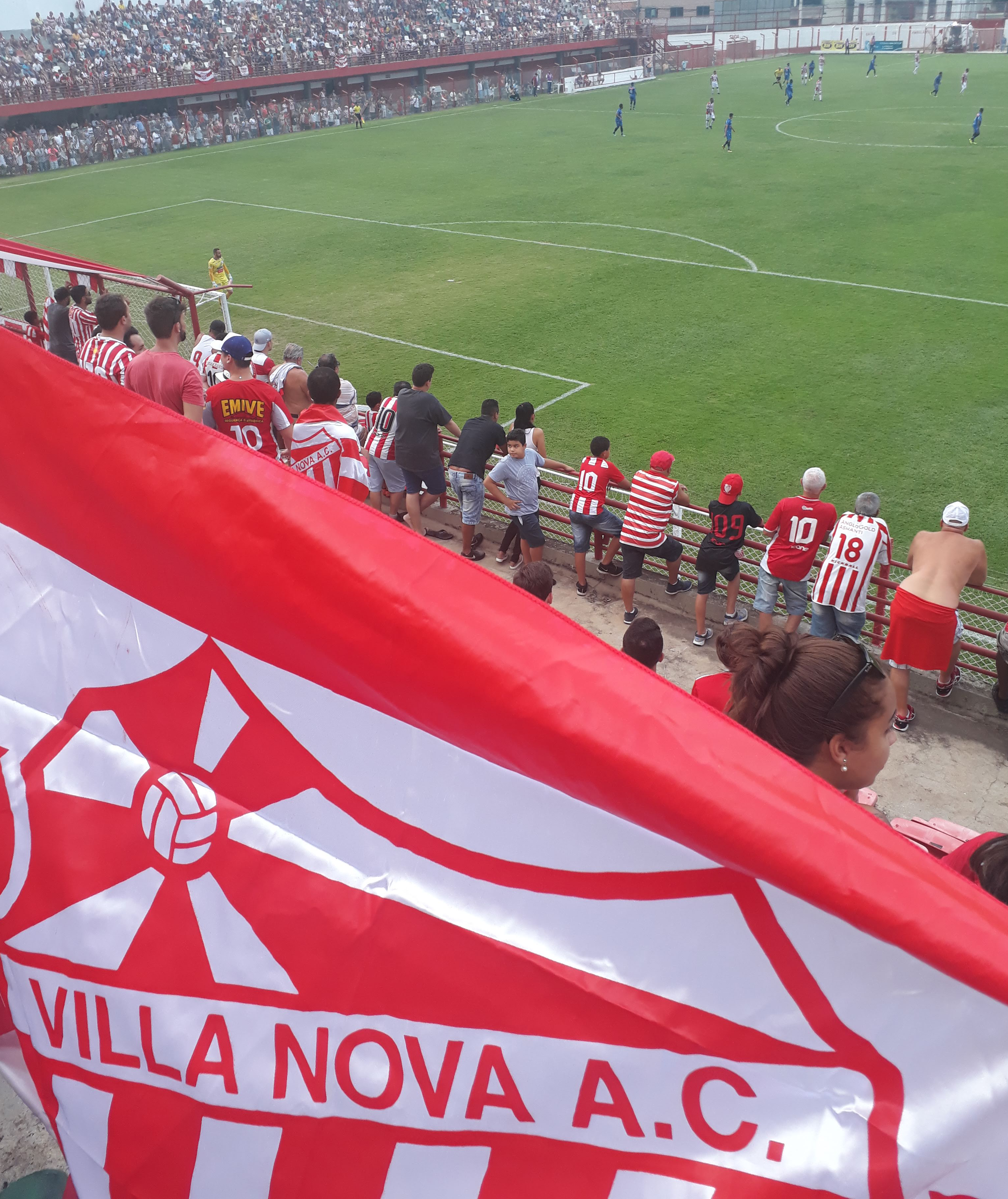
Jogo do Villa Nova – MG.png

Estádio Municipal Castor Cifuentes – named 1936 after a former president (1932–35) of the local Villa Nova AC, also known as Alçapão do Bonfim, the "Trap of Bonfim" after the neighbourhood just east of the city centre, or Penidão, nicknamed after the city's mayor Vitor Penido, who reformed the stadium in 1989 – is a football stadium located in Nova Lima, a city with a population of about 80,000 people located about 20 kilometres south-east of the centre of Belo Horizonte, the capital of the south-east Brazilian state of Minas Gerais. It is also known by the nickname Penidão, nicknamed after the city's mayor Vitor Penido, who reformed the stadium in 1989. It was built in 1930 and is owned by the Municipality of Nova Lima. The stadium has a maximum capacity of 15,000 people.

It is used mostly for matches of the local club Villa Nova Atlético Clube, which in its glory years between 1932 and 1951 has won five times the State Championship of Minas Gerais.

Estádio Castor Cifuentes's inaugural match after being renovated was played on October 15, 1989 when Guarani EC of Divinópolis beat Villa Nova 1–0. The goalscorer was Formiga. The stadium's current attendance record of 15,000 was set in this match.

In 2011 the stadium received about 8,000 seats that were removed from the Mineirão stadium in Belo Horizonte, as this underwent a major renovation in preparation for the 2014 World Cup.
