= Campeonato Brasileiro de Futebol Feminino Série A3 =

Brazilian women's football tournament

- Founded: May 18, 2021
- Country: Brazil
- Confederation: CBF
- Number of clubs: 32 (since 2022)
- Level on pyramid: 3
- Promotion to: Campeonato Brasileiro de Futebol Feminino Série A2
- Current champions: Planalto (1st title) (2026)
- Broadcaster(s): Band; Mycujoo; Twitter
- Website: Official website
- Current: 2026 edition

The Campeonato Brasileiro de Futebol Feminino Série A3 (Brazilian Women's National Championship Third Level) is an annual Brazilian women's club football tournament organized by the CBF.

== History ==
On May 18, 2021, the Brazilian Football Confederation (CBF) announced the creation of the competition. The tournament was created due to the unevenness in the first phase of the Campeonato Brasileiro de Futebol Feminino Série A2, with teams in a “comfort zone”, as they know they have five games guaranteed and a prize pool to meet that table. This results in routs at the beginning of the competition.

== Distribution ==
=== In 2022 ===
1. One representative from each of the 27 Federated Units;
2. A club more from the best federation in the RNF (National Ranking of Federations)
3. The top 4 in the CBF Ranking (male) that are not already in the Campeonato Brasileiro de Futebol Feminino Série A1 and Campeonato Brasileiro de Futebol Feminino Série A2.
- 32 Associations.

=== In 2023 ===
1. One representative from each of the 27 Federated Units;
2. A club more from the best federation in the RNF (National Ranking of Federations)
3. The 4 teams relegated from the previous year's Série A2;
- 32 Associations.

== List of Champions ==
Below is a list of all Campeonato Brasileiro Série A3 champions:

Year	Winner	Runner-up
2022	(São Paulo (state)) AD Taubaté	(Amazonas (Brazilian state)) 3B da Amazônia
2023	(Mato Grosso) Mixto	(Pará) Remo
2024	(Rio de Janeiro (state)) Vasco da Gama	(Pará) Paysandu
2025	(Piauí) Atlético Piauiense	(Goiás) Vila Nova
2026	(Goiás) Planalto	(Sergipe) Juventude

== Top Scorers ==
Year	Player (team)	Goals
2022	Ingrid (Toledo)	7
2023	Bia Batista (Mixto)	10
2024	Maria Vitória (Vasco da Gama)	13
2025	Silmara (Atlético Piauiense)	10
2026	Laureen (Juventude-SE)	10

== Clubs promoted to Série A2 ==
Year	Clubs
2022	AD Taubaté, 3B, Sport Recife, Vila Nova (GO)
2023	Mixto, Remo, Juventude (RS), VF4 (PB)
2024	Vasco da Gama, Paysandu, Ação, Vitória (BA)
2025	Atlético Piauiense, Vila Nova (GO), Doce Mel, Itabirito
2026	Planalto (GO), Juventude (SE), Realidade Jovem, Portuguesa (AP)

== See also ==
- Sport in Brazil
  - Football in Brazil
    - Women's football in Brazil
- Campeonato Brasileiro Feminino Série A1
- Campeonato Brasileiro Feminino Série A2
- Copa do Brasil de Futebol Feminino
- Copa Libertadores Femenina
