= Itaitinga =

Municipality in Ceará, Brazil

- Municipality
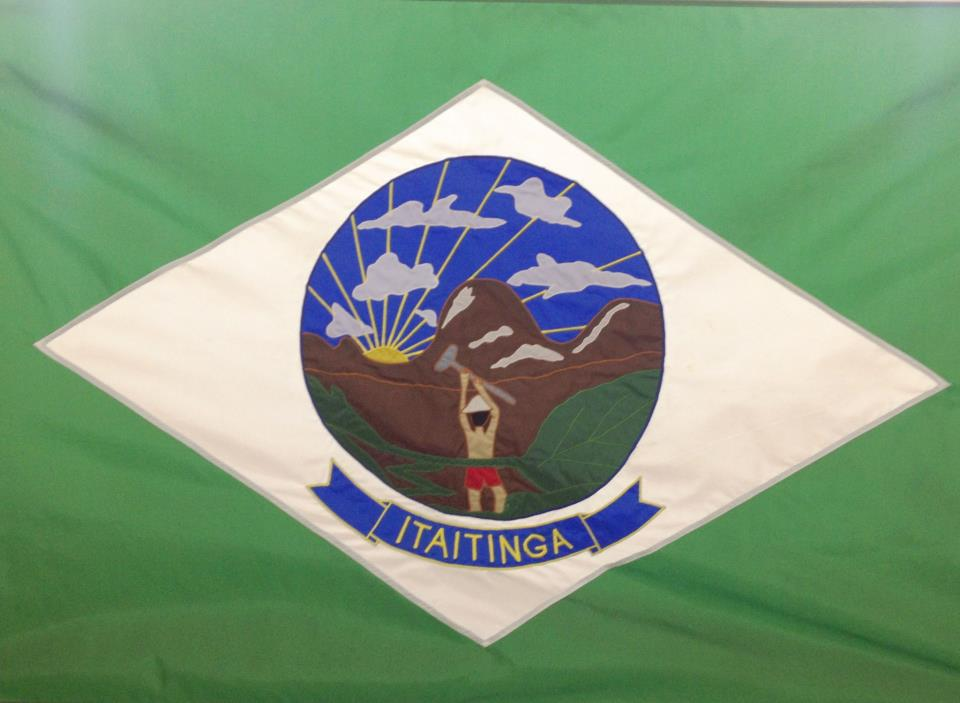
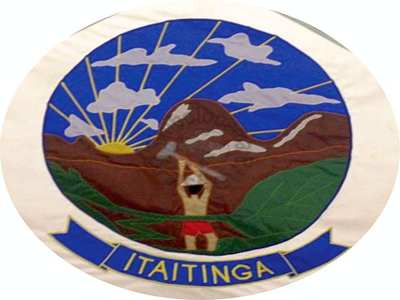
- Flag Seal

- Location in Brazil
- Coordinates: 3°58′S 38°31′W
- Country: Brazil
- Region: Nordeste
- State: Ceará
- Mesoregion: Metropolitana de Fortaleza

Population (2020)
  - Total: 38,325
- Time zone: UTC−3 (BRT)

Itaitinga is a municipality in the state of Ceará in the Northeast region of Brazil.

== See also ==
- List of municipalities in Ceará
