= Clube Atlético Piauiense =

Atlético Piauiense
- Full name: Clube Atlético Piauiense
- Nicknames: Cavernão, Auriverde
- Founded: 14 November 2019; 6 years ago
- Ground: Lindolfo Monteiro
- Capacity: 8,000
- President: Edson Sá
- Head coach: Jerson Testoni
- League: Campeonato Piauiense
- 2025: Piauiense, 5th of 8
Home colours	Away colours

Clube Atlético Piauiense, commonly known as Atlético Piauiense, is a Brazilian football team based in Teresina, Piauí. Founded in 2019, they won the Campeonato Brasileiro de Futebol Feminino Série A3 once.

== History ==
Founded on 14 November 2019, Atlético Piauiense began playing only in youth tournaments. In 2024, the club established a professional squad to play in the year's Campeonato Piauiense Second Division, where they achieved promotion by finishing second after losing on penalties to Piauí EC.

Despite only avoiding relegation in the 2025 Campeonato Piauiense, Atlético had a successful season in other categories, with the women's side winning the Campeonato Brasileiro de Futebol Feminino Série A3, and the under-20s winning the state league. That category also reached the round of 16 in the 2026 Copa São Paulo de Futebol Júnior, achieving the best campaign of any team from the state of Piauí in the competition.

Atlético also reached the finals of the 2026 Piauiense, qualifying to the Série D, Copa do Brasil and Copa do Nordeste for the first time ever. They again lost to Piauí, however.

== Honours ==
=== Women's Football ===
- Campeonato Brasileiro de Futebol Feminino Série A3
  - Winners (1): 2025
- Campeonato Piauiense de Futebol Feminino
  - Winners (1): 2024
