= Itabirito Futebol Clube =

Brazilian football club based in Itabirito, Minas Gerais

Itabirito
- Full name: Itabirito Futebol Clube
- Nickname: Wildcat
- Founded: 22 May 2022; 3 years ago
- Ground: Usina Esperança
- Capacity: 10,000
- President: Felipe Fazzion
- Head coach: Cícero Júnior
- League: Campeonato Mineiro
- 2025 2025: Série D, 58th of 64; Mineiro, 9th of 12
Home colors	Away colors

Itabirito Futebol Clube, simply known as Itabirito, is a Brazilian football club based in Itabirito, Minas Gerais.

== History ==
The club was established in 2022 and disputed their first championship in the Campeonato Mineiro Segunda Divisão. Finishing in the third position, the club benefited from the championship regulations as runners-up Coimbra B cannot be promoted. In 2023, Itabirito gained access to the first level of the Campeonato Mineiro and, after a combination of opponents' results, the title of the Campeonato Mineiro Módulo II.

== Women's football ==
Itabirito also has a women's football team, which competed in the Campeonato Mineiro Feminino for the first time in 2024, finishing third. In 2025, it achieved national promotion by reaching the semifinals of Campeonato Brasileiro Série A3.

== Honours ==
- Campeonato Mineiro Módulo II
  - Winners (1): 2023

== Appearances ==
Following is the summary of Itabirito appearances in Campeonato Mineiro.

Season	Division	Final position
2022	3rd	3rd
2023	2nd	1st
2024	1st	7th
2025	1st	10th

== Notable players ==
- (Brazil) Patric
