= Clube do Remo (women) =

Brazilian women's football club

Remo
- Full name: Clube do Remo Feminino
- Nickname: Leoas (Lionesses)
- Founded: 1983; 43 years ago
- Ground: CT Rei da Amazônia; Baenão
- Capacity: 5,000; 13,200
- Head coach: Rogério Gomes
- League: Campeonato Brasileiro Série A3; Campeonato Paraense
- 2025 2025: Série A2, 15th of 16 (relegated); Paraense, 3rd of 5
- Website: clubedoremo.com.br
Home colors	Away colors

Clube do Remo, commonly known as Remo, is a professional women's association football club based in Belém, Brazil.

== History ==
Remo's women's football began in 1983, when the team won that year's Campeonato Paraense de Futebol Feminino. However, the department remained inactive for years. It returned to the state championships in 2021.

In 2023, they were runners-up in the Série A3 and won access to the Série A2.

== Stadium ==
Remo's women's team plays most of its matches at the CT Rei da Amazônia, the club's training center. The most important matches are played at Baenão.

== Honours ==
=== Official tournaments ===
State
Competitions	Titles	Seasons
Campeonato Paraense	4	1983, 2021, 2022, 2023
