= Federação Maranhense de Futebol =

Brazilian football state federation

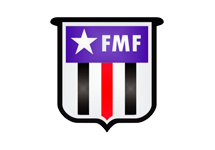
- Formation: 11 January 1918; 108 years ago
- Type: List of international sport federations
- Headquarters: São Luís, Maranhão, Brazil
- Official language: Portuguese
- President: Carlos Alberto Ferreira
- Website: www.futebolmaranhense.com.br

The Federação Maranhense de Futebol (English: Football Association of Maranhão state) was founded on January 11, 1918. It manages all the official football tournaments within the Brazilian state of Maranhão, which are the Campeonato Maranhense, the Campeonato Maranhense lower levels and the Copa União do Maranhão. It represents Maranhão clubs at the Brazilian Football Confederation (CBF).
