= Federação de Futebol do Estado de Rondônia =

Brazilian football state federation

- Formation: 29 October 1944; 82 years ago
- Type: List of international sport federations
- Headquarters: Porto Velho, Rondônia, Brazil
- Official language: Portuguese
- Website: ffer.com.br

The Federação de Futebol do Estado de Rondônia (English: Football Association of Rondônia state) was founded on October 29, 1944, and it manages all the official football tournaments within the state of Rondônia, which are the Campeonato Rondoniense and the Campeonato Rondoniense lower levels, and represents the clubs at the Brazilian Football Confederation (CBF).
