= Federação de Futebol de Mato Grosso do Sul =

Brazilian football state federation

- Formation: 3 December 1978; 47 years ago
- Type: List of international sport federations
- Headquarters: Campo Grande, Mato Grosso do Sul, Brazil
- Official language: Portuguese
- President: Francisco Cezário de Oliveira
- Website: futebolms.com.br

The Federação de Futebol de Mato Grosso do Sul (English: Football Association of Mato Grosso do Sul state) was founded on December 3, 1978, and it manages all the official football tournaments within the state of Mato Grosso do Sul, which are the Campeonato Sul-Mato-Grossense, the Campeonato Sul-Mato-Grossense lower levels and the Copa MS de Futebol, and represents the clubs at the Brazilian Football Confederation (CBF).
