= Federação Roraimense de Futebol =

Football Association of Roraima, Brazil

- Formation: 23 July 1948; 78 years ago
- Type: List of international sport federations
- Headquarters: Boa Vista, Roraima, Brazil
- Official language: Portuguese

The Federação Roraimense de Futebol (English: Football Association of Roraima state) was founded on July 23, 1948, and it manages all the official football tournaments within the state of Roraima, which are the Campeonato Roraimense, and represents the clubs at the Brazilian Football Confederation (CBF).
