= Esporte Clube Juventude (women) =

Women's football club based in Porto Alegre, Rio Grande do Sul, Brazil

Juventude
- Full name: Esporte Clube Juventude
- Nicknames: Esmeraldas; Gurias Jaconeras
- Ground: Estádio do SESI
- Capacity: 2,000
- President: Fábio Pizzamiglio
- Head coach: Luciano Brandalise
- League: Campeonato Brasileiro Série A1; Campeonato Gaúcho
- 2025 2025: Série A1, 14th of 16; Gaúcho, 2nd of 5
Home colours	Away colours

Esporte Clube Juventude, commonly known as Juventude or the Esmeraldas, is a Brazilian women's Association football club, based in the city of Caxias do Sul, Rio Grande do Sul, Brazil. They won the Campeonato Gaúcho de Futebol Feminino three times.

== History ==
Juventude first established a women's team in the 1990s, winning the Campeonato Gaúcho de Futebol Feminino in three consecutive years (2004, 2005 and 2006). After a period of inactivity, the women's side was reestablished in May 2021, initially with an under-18 category.

Juventude achieved promotion from the Campeonato Brasileiro de Futebol Feminino Série A3 in May 2023, and reached a second consecutive promotion in July of the following year.

== Players ==
=== Current squad ===
As of 13 April 2026.

Note: Flags indicate national team as defined under FIFA eligibility rules; some limited exceptions apply. Players may hold more than one non-FIFA nationality.

No.	Pos.	Nation	Player
1	GK	BRA	Renata May
2	DF	BRA	Grazi
3	DF	BRA	Joice Scatola
5	MF	BRA	Tefinha
6	DF	BRA	Maiza
7	MF	BRA	Nicole Marussi (on loan from Corinthians)
8	MF	BRA	Luciene Baião
11	FW	BRA	Teté
12	GK	BRA	Thaís Amorim
13	DF	BRA	Andressa Kreski
14	DF	BRA	Carla Beatriz
15	MF	BRA	Laura Pigatin (on loan from Ferroviária)
16	DF	PAR	Limpia Fretes
18	MF	BRA	Leka

No.	Pos.	Nation	Player
19	FW	BRA	Taysa Félix
20	MF	BRA	Aninha Bigeschi
21	FW	BRA	Duda Calazans
22	MF	BRA	Bruna Emília
23	GK	BRA	Kai
25	DF	BRA	Carol Ladaga
26	DF	BRA	Núbia
28	DF	BRA	Bell Silva
29	DF	BRA	Apoliana
39	MF	BRA	Joyce Manfio
49	FW	BRA	Flávia Giovana
99	FW	URU	Martha Figueiredo
—	MF	BRA	Ana Luiza

== Honours ==
=== Official tournaments ===
State
Competitions	Titles	Seasons
Campeonato Gaúcho	3	2004, 2005, 2006

== See also ==
- Esporte Clube Juventude
