= Federação de Futebol do Acre =

Brazilian football state federation

- Formation: 21 January 1947; 79 years ago
- Type: List of international sport federations
- Headquarters: Rio Branco, Acre, Brazil
- Official language: Portuguese
- Website: FFAC

The Federação de Futebol do Acre (English: Football Association of Acre) was founded on 21 January 1947, and it manages all the official football tournaments within the state of Acre, which are the Campeonato Acriano and the Campeonato Acriano lower levels, and represents the clubs at the Brazilian Football Confederation (CBF).
