= Federação de Futebol do Piauí =

Brazilian football state federation

- Formation: 25 November 1941; 84 years ago
- Type: List of international sport federations
- Headquarters: Teresina, Piauí, Brazil
- Official language: Portuguese
- President: Cesarino Oliveira
- Website: ffp-pi.com.br

The Federação de Futebol do Piauí (English: Football Association of Piauí state) was founded on November 25, 1941, and it manages all the official football tournaments within the state of Piauí, which are the Campeonato Piauiense, the Campeonato Piauiense lower levels and the Copa Piauí, and represents the clubs at the Brazilian Football Confederation (CBF). Since 2011, the federation organizes the Women's Campeonato Piauiense.
