= Federação Paraense de Futebol =

Brazilian football state federation

- Formation: 2 December 1969; 56 years ago
- Type: List of international sport federations
- Headquarters: Belém, Pará, Brazil
- Official language: Portuguese
- Website: fpfpara.com.br

The Federação Paraense de Futebol (English: Football Association of Pará state) manages all the official football tournaments within the state of Pará, which are the Campeonato Paraense and the Campeonato Paraense lower levels, and represents the clubs at the Brazilian Football Confederation (CBF). The organization was founded on December 2, 1969. It replaced the Federação Paraense Desportiva (FPD), founded on May 9, 1941.
