= Doce Mel Esporte Clube =

Brazilian football club

Doce Mel
- Full name: Doce Mel Esporte Clube
- Nickname(s): Tricolor; Azulão
- Founded: 1 February 1984
- Ground: Barbosão
- League: Campeonato Baiano
- 2022: 8th of 10
Home colours	Away colours

Doce Mel Esporte Clube, former Associação Desportiva Atlanta, is a sports association from Cruz das Almas, in the state of Bahia. Their colors are blue, red and white.

Associação Desportiva Atlanta was founded on February 1, 1984. It won the title of the Bahia Championship Second Level in 1987, reaching the 1st Division the following year. In the Bahian elite, Atlanta debuted on February 28, being defeated at home by Catuense by 2 to 1. In the first round, they scored just one point in five matches. In the second round, they were two points from four matches. In the third round, he had his best participation, scoring six points in five matches and reaching the end of the round. In the final round, the team lost three matches: 5-0 for Esporte Clube Bahia, 7-2 for Fluminense de Feira and 1-0 for Catuense. In the fourth round, he lost the four matches he played and ended up relegated to the 2nd Division of 1989.

After relegation, Atlanta played in the 2nd Division until 1992. In 1993, it abandoned professionalism until 2000, when it returned in the 3rd Division, without achieving good results. In 2008, supported by the company Doce Mel, from the city of Ipiaú, he returned to professional football in the 2nd Division. Due to a stumble in the last game against Cruzeiro (which was a flashlight, he was eliminated and with two athletes less on the field, and even so he managed to reach the tie with a goal in the last minute of the game), he was out of the semi-final Final. After a gap year, Atlanta returned to activities in 2010 to compete in the 2nd Division again with the support of Doce Mel. At first, he demanded that Atlanta play in Ipiaú, but as the stadium in that city did not meet the requirements of the FBF, Atlanta sent their games in the city of Jequié, headquarters of the team.

Atlanta was acquired by Grupo Doce Mel in 2017 and changed its name definitively in 2019. Its headquarters also changed from Jequié to Ipiaú.

In 2019, the club played again in the second division. After winning the Olímpia team, the Doce Mel won the title and access to the first division of the Campeonato Bahiano 2020.

== Achievements ==
- Campeonato Baiano Second Level:
  - Winners (2): 1987, 2019
