= 2024 Campeonato Brasileiro Série D =

2024 Brazilian soccer competition

Campeonato Brasileiro Série D
- Season: 2024
- Dates: 27 April – 29 September
- Champions: Retrô (1st title)
- Promoted: Anápolis; Itabaiana; Maringá; Retrô
- Matches: 510
- Goals: 1,143 (2.24 per match)
- Top goalscorer: Thiaguinho (10 goals)
- Biggest home win: São José 6–0 Patrocinense; Group A7, R8, 12 June
- Biggest away win: Humaitá 0–5 Manauara; Group A1, R9, 16 June
- Highest scoring: 7 goals Two matches 2–5; One match 3–4; One match 5–2; One match 6–1

The 2024 Campeonato Brasileiro Série D was a football competition held in Brazil, equivalent to the fourth division. The competition began on 27 April and ended on 29 September 2024.

Sixty-four teams competed in the tournament. Sixty teams qualified from their state leagues and cups, and four relegated from the 2023 Campeonato Brasileiro Série C (Altos, América de Natal, Manaus and Pouso Alegre).

The four semi-finalists, Anápolis, Itabaiana, Maringá and Retrô, were promoted to the 2025 Campeonato Brasileiro Série C.

In the finals, Retrô won their first title after defeating Anápolis 4–3 on aggregate.

== Teams ==
Location of teams in 2024 Série D

=== Federation ranking ===
The number of teams from each state was chosen based on the CBF State Ranking.

Rank	Federation	Coeff.	Teams	Notes
1	(São Paulo (state)) São Paulo	91,397	4	
2	(Rio de Janeiro (state)) Rio de Janeiro	52,969	3	
3	Minas Gerais	41,799	3	+1 (C)
4	Rio Grande do Sul	41,190	3	
5	(Paraná (state)) Paraná	34,154	3	
6	Ceará	27,956	3	
7	Goiás	25,501	3	
8	(Santa Catarina (state)) Santa Catarina	24,431	3	
9	Bahia	20,427	3	
10	Pernambuco	13,898	2	
11	Alagoas	11,743	2	
12	Mato Grosso	10,932	2	
13	Pará	9,437	2	
14	Maranhão	7,389	2	
15	Rio Grande do Norte	6,663	2	+1 (C)
16	Paraíba	5,631	2	
17	(Amazonas (Brazilian state)) Amazonas	5,279	2	+1 (C)
18	Sergipe	4,716	2	
19	Piauí	4,270	2	+1 (C)
20	(Federal District (Brazil)) Distrito Federal	3,365	2	
21	Espírito Santo	2,566	2	
22	(Acre (state)) Acre	2,502	2	
23	Tocantins	1,953	2	
24	Roraima	1,761	1	
25	Mato Grosso do Sul	1,401	1	
26	Rondônia	1,293	1	
27	Amapá	1,211	1	

=== Participating teams ===
Federation	Team	Home city	Qualification method
(Acre (state)) Acre	Rio Branco	Rio Branco	2023 Campeonato Acreano champions
(Acre (state)) Acre	Humaitá	Porto Acre	2023 Campeonato Acreano runners-up
Alagoas	ASA	Arapiraca	2023 Campeonato Alagoano runners-up
Alagoas	CSE	Palmeira dos Índios	2023 Copa Alagoas champions
Amapá	Trem	Macapá	2023 Campeonato Amapaense champions
(Amazonas (Brazilian state)) Amazonas	Manauara	Manaus	2023 Campeonato Amazonense runners-up
(Amazonas (Brazilian state)) Amazonas	Princesa do Solimões	Manacapuru	2023 Campeonato Amazonense 3rd place
(Amazonas (Brazilian state)) Amazonas	Manaus	Manaus	2023 Série C 17th place
Bahia	Jacuipense	Riachão do Jacuípe	2023 Campeonato Baiano runners-up
Bahia	Itabuna	Itabuna	2023 Campeonato Baiano 3rd place
Bahia	Juazeirense	Juazeiro	2023 Campeonato Baiano 4th place
Ceará	Iguatu	Iguatu	2023 Campeonato Cearense 3rd place
Ceará	Maracanã	Maracanaú	2023 Campeonato Cearense 5th place
Ceará	Atlético Cearense	Fortaleza	2023 Campeonato Cearense 6th place
Espírito Santo	Real Noroeste	Águia Branca	2023 Campeonato Capixaba champions
Espírito Santo	Serra	Serra	2023 Copa ES champions
(Federal District (Brazil)) Federal District	Real Brasília	Brasília	2023 Campeonato Brasiliense champions
(Federal District (Brazil)) Federal District	Brasiliense	Taguatinga	2023 Campeonato Brasiliense runners-up
Goiás	Anápolis	Anápolis	2023 Campeonato Goiano 4th place
Goiás	CRAC	Catalão	2023 Campeonato Goiano 5th place
Goiás	Iporá	Iporá	2023 Campeonato Goiano 7th place
Maranhão	Maranhão	São Luís	2023 Campeonato Maranhense champions
Maranhão	Moto Club	São Luís	2023 Campeonato Maranhense runners-up
Mato Grosso	União Rondonópolis	Rondonópolis	2023 Campeonato Mato-Grossense runners-up
Mato Grosso	Mixto	Cuiabá	2023 Copa FMF champions
Mato Grosso do Sul	Costa Rica	Costa Rica	2023 Campeonato Sul-Mato-Grossense champions
Minas Gerais	Ipatinga	Ipatinga	2023 Campeonato Mineiro 9th place
Minas Gerais	Patrocinense (Note: Villa Nova, Democrata GV, and Caldense (2023 Campeonato Mineiro 6th, 7th and 11th place, respectively) declined to participate in the Série D. They were replaced by the 10th place Patrocinense and 12th place Democrata SL, despite the latter suffering relegation.)	Patrocínio	2023 Campeonato Mineiro 10th place
Minas Gerais	Democrata SL	Sete Lagoas	2023 Campeonato Mineiro 12th place
Minas Gerais	Pouso Alegre	Pouso Alegre	2023 Série C 20th place
Pará	Águia de Marabá	Marabá	2023 Campeonato Paraense champions
Pará	Cametá	Cametá	2023 Campeonato Paraense 4th place
Paraíba	Treze	Campina Grande	2023 Campeonato Paraibano champions
Paraíba	Sousa	Sousa	2023 Campeonato Paraibano runners-up
(Paraná (state)) Paraná	FC Cascavel	Cascavel	2023 Campeonato Paranaense runners-up
(Paraná (state)) Paraná	Maringá	Maringá	2023 Campeonato Paranaense 4th place
(Paraná (state)) Paraná	Cianorte	Cianorte	2023 Campeonato Paranaense 6th place
Pernambuco	Retrô	Camaragibe	2023 Campeonato Pernambucano first stage runners-up
Pernambuco	Petrolina	Petrolina	2023 Campeonato Pernambucano first stage 4th place
Piauí	River	Teresina	2023 Campeonato Piauiense champions
Piauí	Fluminense	Teresina	2023 Campeonato Piauiense runners-up
Piauí	Altos	Altos	2023 Série C 19th place
(Rio de Janeiro (state)) Rio de Janeiro	Audax Rio	Angra dos Reis	2023 Campeonato Carioca 6th place
(Rio de Janeiro (state)) Rio de Janeiro	Nova Iguaçu	Nova Iguaçu	2023 Campeonato Carioca 7th place
(Rio de Janeiro (state)) Rio de Janeiro	Portuguesa	Rio de Janeiro	2023 Copa Rio champions
Rio Grande do Norte	Potiguar de Mossoró	Mossoró	2023 Campeonato Potiguar 3rd place
Rio Grande do Norte	Santa Cruz de Natal	Natal	2023 Campeonato Potiguar 4th place
Rio Grande do Norte	América de Natal	Natal	2023 Série C 18th place
Rio Grande do Sul	Brasil de Pelotas	Pelotas	2023 Campeonato Gaúcho 7th place
Rio Grande do Sul	Novo Hamburgo	Novo Hamburgo	2023 Campeonato Gaúcho 8th place
Rio Grande do Sul	Avenida	Santa Cruz do Sul	2023 Campeonato Gaúcho 9th place
Rondônia	Porto Velho	Porto Velho	2023 Campeonato Rondoniense champions
Roraima	São Raimundo	Boa Vista	2023 Campeonato Roraimense champions
(Santa Catarina (state)) Santa Catarina	Hercílio Luz	Tubarão	2023 Campeonato Catarinense 3rd place
(Santa Catarina (state)) Santa Catarina	Barra	Balneário Camboriú	2023 Campeonato Catarinense 4th place
(Santa Catarina (state)) Santa Catarina	Concórdia	Concórdia	2023 Campeonato Catarinense 7th place
(São Paulo (state)) São Paulo	Água Santa	Diadema	2023 Campeonato Paulista runners-up
(São Paulo (state)) São Paulo	Santo André	Santo André	2023 Campeonato Paulista 11th place
(São Paulo (state)) São Paulo	Inter de Limeira	Limeira	2023 Campeonato Paulista 13th place
(São Paulo (state)) São Paulo	São José	São José dos Campos	2023 Copa Paulista runners-up
Sergipe	Itabaiana	Itabaiana	2023 Campeonato Sergipano champions
Sergipe	Sergipe	Aracaju	2023 Campeonato Sergipano 3rd place
Tocantins	Tocantinópolis	Tocantinópolis	2023 Campeonato Tocantinense champions
Tocantins	Capital	Palmas	2023 Campeonato Tocantinense runners-up

== Format ==
In the group stage, the 64 teams were divided into eight groups of eight organized regionally. Top four teams qualified for the round of 32. From the round of 32 on the competition was played as a knock-out tournament with each round contested over two legs.

== Group stage ==
In the group stage, each group was played on a home-and-away round-robin basis. The teams were ranked according to points (3 points for a win, 1 point for a draw, and 0 points for a loss). If tied on points, the following criteria would be used to determine the ranking: 1. Wins; 2. Goal difference; 3. Goals scored; 4. Head-to-head (if the tie was only between two teams); 5. Fewest red cards; 6. Fewest yellow cards; 7. Draw in the headquarters of the Brazilian Football Confederation (Regulations Article 15).

The top four teams qualified for the round of 32.

=== Group A1 ===
Pos	Team	Pld	W	D	L	GF	GA	GD	Pts	Qualification	MNA	POR	PRI	MAN	TRE	SAO	RIO	HUM
1	(Amazonas (Brazilian state)) Manauara	14	10	4	0	35	7	+28	34	Advance to round of 32		3–1	3–1	0–0	4–1	4–0	3–1	4–0
2	(Rondônia) Porto Velho	14	9	1	4	29	15	+14	28	Advance to round of 32	1–1		6–1	2–0	2–1	5–1	2–0	3–0
3	(Amazonas (Brazilian state)) Princesa do Solimões	14	7	4	3	23	16	+7	25	Advance to round of 32	0–0	0–1		3–3	4–1	2–0	2–0	3–1
4	(Amazonas (Brazilian state)) Manaus	14	7	3	4	21	18	+3	24	Advance to round of 32	0–4	2–1	0–2		3–1	2–0	2–0	1–0
5	(Amapá) Trem	14	5	3	6	18	22	−4	18		1–1	0–2	0–0	0–0		1–2	3–1	2–1
6	(Roraima) São Raimundo	14	5	1	8	16	24	−8	16		0–1	4–1	1–2	1–2	1–2		3–1	1–0
7	(Acre (state)) Rio Branco	14	3	3	8	14	25	−11	12		1–2	2–1	0–0	2–1	1–2	1–1		2–2
8	(Acre (state)) Humaitá	14	0	1	13	7	36	−29	1		0–5	0–1	0–3	2–5	0–3	0–1	1–2	

Source: CBF
Rules for classification: 1) points; 2) wins; 3) goal difference; 4) goals scored; 5) head-to-head results (only between 2 teams); 6) fewest red cards; 7) fewest yellow cards; 8) draw.

=== Group A2 ===
Pos	Team	Pld	W	D	L	GF	GA	GD	Pts	Qualification	MAR	ALT	RIV	TOC	CAM	FLU	MOT	AGU
1	Maranhão	14	8	3	3	22	9	+13	27	Advance to round of 32		0–2	1–0	0–1	1–0	3–0	5–1	4–0
2	(Piauí) Altos	14	7	3	4	22	16	+6	24	Advance to round of 32	1–1		1–2	2–1	2–1	3–0	1–2	2–0
3	(Piauí) River	14	5	4	5	20	16	+4	19	Advance to round of 32	0–1	1–1		5–0	1–0	2–2	1–3	2–1
4	(Tocantins) Tocantinópolis	14	5	4	5	15	19	−4	19	Advance to round of 32	1–1	3–1	0–3		1–0	1–1	1–0	3–0
5	(Pará) Cametá	14	4	4	6	17	17	0	16		0–2	0–1	3–2	3–1		1–0	4–1	1–1
6	(Piauí) Fluminense	14	3	6	5	14	19	−5	15		1–2	1–0	2–0	1–0	2–2		2–2	1–2
7	(Maranhão) Moto Club	14	3	6	5	17	24	−7	15		2–1	1–2	1–1	2–2	1–1	0–0		1–1
8	(Pará) Águia de Marabá	14	2	8	4	12	19	−7	14		0–0	3–3	0–0	0–0	1–1	1–1	2–0	

Source: CBF
Rules for classification: 1) points; 2) wins; 3) goal difference; 4) goals scored; 5) head-to-head results (only between 2 teams); 6) fewest red cards; 7) fewest yellow cards; 8) draw.

=== Group A3 ===
Pos	Team	Pld	W	D	L	GF	GA	GD	Pts	Qualification	TRE	IGU	AME	ATL	SOU	SAN	MAR	POT
1	(Paraíba) Treze	14	9	4	1	28	9	+19	31	Advance to round of 32		3–0	1–1	1–1	2–0	2–0	2–1	2–0
2	(Ceará) Iguatu	14	8	3	3	14	8	+6	27	Advance to round of 32	1–0		1–0	1–0	1–0	2–0	2–0	2–0
3	(Rio Grande do Norte) América de Natal	14	7	5	2	18	9	+9	26	Advance to round of 32	1–1	1–0		3–0	1–0	2–0	2–1	2–0
4	(Ceará) Atlético Cearense	14	5	3	6	14	16	−2	18	Advance to round of 32	0–2	0–1	1–2		2–0	2–0	1–0	1–2
5	(Paraíba) Sousa	14	5	3	6	12	14	−2	18		1–1	0–0	0–0	2–3		3–0	3–2	1–0
6	(Rio Grande do Norte) Santa Cruz de Natal	14	5	1	8	17	25	−8	16		3–4	2–1	3–2	1–2	2–0		1–0	2–2
7	(Ceará) Maracanã	14	3	3	8	13	21	−8	12		0–4	2–2	1–1	0–0	0–1	2–1		2–0
8	(Rio Grande do Norte) Potiguar de Mossoró	14	1	4	9	7	21	−14	7		0–3	0–0	0–0	1–1	0–1	1–2	1–2	

Source: CBF
Rules for classification: 1) points; 2) wins; 3) goal difference; 4) goals scored; 5) head-to-head results (only between 2 teams); 6) fewest red cards; 7) fewest yellow cards; 8) draw.

=== Group A4 ===
Pos	Team	Pld	W	D	L	GF	GA	GD	Pts	Qualification	ITA	RET	JAC	ASA	CSE	JUA	PET	SER
1	(Sergipe) Itabaiana	14	8	2	4	21	11	+10	26	Advance to round of 32		2–1	2–0	3–0	3–1	1–2	2–0	0–0
2	(Pernambuco) Retrô	14	8	2	4	21	12	+9	26	Advance to round of 32	1–2		3–1	1–0	2–1	1–0	1–0	5–0
3	(Bahia) Jacuipense	14	7	2	5	15	13	+2	23	Advance to round of 32	1–0	1–0		1–0	1–2	2–1	3–0	1–1
4	(Alagoas) ASA	14	6	3	5	15	13	+2	21	Advance to round of 32	0–2	0–0	1–0		1–2	2–0	1–0	2–0
5	(Alagoas) CSE	14	6	3	5	18	17	+1	21		2–1	0–0	1–2	1–1		0–1	2–0	3–2
6	(Bahia) Juazeirense	14	6	3	5	13	13	0	21		1–1	1–2	2–1	1–1	0–2		2–0	1–0
7	(Pernambuco) Petrolina	14	2	4	8	6	19	−13	10		0–2	3–1	0–0	0–3	1–1	0–0		1–1
8	Sergipe	14	2	3	9	11	22	−11	9		2–0	1–3	0–1	2–3	2–0	0–1	0–1	

Source: CBF
Rules for classification: 1) points; 2) wins; 3) goal difference; 4) goals scored; 5) head-to-head results (only between 2 teams); 6) fewest red cards; 7) fewest yellow cards; 8) draw.

=== Group A5 ===
Pos	Team	Pld	W	D	L	GF	GA	GD	Pts	Qualification	BRA	ANA	MIX	CRA	IPO	UNI	REA	CAP
1	(Federal District (Brazil)) Brasiliense	14	10	2	2	27	10	+17	32	Advance to round of 32		1–0	1–1	2–0	1–0	2–1	3–1	4–0
2	(Goiás) Anápolis	14	7	4	3	18	10	+8	25	Advance to round of 32	0–2		1–1	0–0	4–0	1–1	1–0	3–1
3	(Mato Grosso) Mixto	14	5	7	2	18	13	+5	22	Advance to round of 32	2–1	1–1		1–1	1–0	1–1	2–1	3–0
4	(Goiás) CRAC	14	5	7	2	13	8	+5	22	Advance to round of 32	1–0	1–2	0–0		2–0	1–0	0–0	4–1
5	(Goiás) Iporá	14	5	2	7	16	21	−5	17		1–3	0–2	2–1	1–1		2–2	3–0	2–1
6	(Mato Grosso) União Rondonópolis	14	3	7	4	14	15	−1	16		1–1	1–0	1–2	0–0	3–0		1–0	0–0
7	(Federal District (Brazil)) Real Brasília	14	2	3	9	10	20	−10	9		1–2	0–1	2–2	1–1	0–2	3–0		1–0
8	(Tocantins) Capital	14	2	2	10	10	29	−19	8		1–4	1–2	1–0	0–1	0–3	2–2	2–0	

Source: CBF
Rules for classification: 1) points; 2) wins; 3) goal difference; 4) goals scored; 5) head-to-head results (only between 2 teams); 6) fewest red cards; 7) fewest yellow cards; 8) draw.

=== Group A6 ===
Pos	Team	Pld	W	D	L	GF	GA	GD	Pts	Qualification	NOV	POR	ITA	REA	SER	IPA	DEM	AUD
1	(Rio de Janeiro (state)) Nova Iguaçu	14	9	4	1	19	5	+14	31	Advance to round of 32		1–0	1–0	1–0	4–0	1–1	3–0	2–0
2	(Rio de Janeiro (state)) Portuguesa	14	6	7	1	18	6	+12	25	Advance to round of 32	1–0		1–1	3–0	1–1	0–0	3–0	3–0
3	(Bahia) Itabuna	14	6	6	2	16	9	+7	24	Advance to round of 32	0–0	0–0		0–0	3–1	0–0	1–1	1–0
4	(Espírito Santo) Real Noroeste	14	5	5	4	16	15	+1	20	Advance to round of 32	0–1	1–1	3–2		0–0	2–0	2–0	3–1
5	(Espírito Santo) Serra	14	5	4	5	16	18	−2	19		1–2	1–2	0–2	2–2		1–0	1–0	1–0
6	(Minas Gerais) Ipatinga	14	2	5	7	8	18	−10	11		1–1	0–2	2–3	2–0	0–4		2–0	0–3
7	(Minas Gerais) Democrata SL	14	2	4	8	8	21	−13	10		1–1	0–0	0–2	1–1	1–2	1–0		2–3
8	(Rio de Janeiro (state)) Audax Rio	14	2	3	9	10	19	−9	9		0–1	1–1	0–1	1–2	1–1	0–0	0–1	

Source: CBF
Rules for classification: 1) points; 2) wins; 3) goal difference; 4) goals scored; 5) head-to-head results (only between 2 teams); 6) fewest red cards; 7) fewest yellow cards; 8) draw.

=== Group A7 ===
Pos	Team	Pld	W	D	L	GF	GA	GD	Pts	Qualification	MAR	INT	AGU	COS	SAN	POU	SAO	PAT
1	(Paraná (state)) Maringá	14	10	2	2	25	10	+15	32	Advance to round of 32		1–0	2–0	2–0	2–1	1–0	3–0	4–0
2	(São Paulo (state)) Inter de Limeira	14	7	3	4	16	7	+9	24	Advance to round of 32	2–2		1–0	1–0	3–0	1–0	1–2	3–0
3	(São Paulo (state)) Água Santa	14	6	4	4	12	10	+2	22	Advance to round of 32	2–1	1–0		0–2	2–0	1–0	1–1	1–0
4	(Mato Grosso do Sul) Costa Rica	14	6	3	5	16	17	−1	21	Advance to round of 32	3–2	0–3	2–1		2–5	1–0	0–0	3–0
5	(São Paulo (state)) Santo André	14	5	5	4	15	13	+2	20		0–1	1–0	1–1	1–0		0–0	4–1	0–0
6	(Minas Gerais) Pouso Alegre	14	3	5	6	11	9	+2	14		0–1	0–0	0–0	0–1	1–1		3–0	4–1
7	(São Paulo (state)) São José	14	2	8	4	13	16	−3	14		1–1	0–0	0–0	0–0	0–0	1–1		6–0
8	(Minas Gerais) Patrocinense	14	1	2	11	6	32	−26	5		1–2	0–1	0–2	2–2	0–1	0–2	2–1	

Source: CBF
Rules for classification: 1) points; 2) wins; 3) goal difference; 4) goals scored; 5) head-to-head results (only between 2 teams); 6) fewest red cards; 7) fewest yellow cards; 8) draw.

=== Group A8 ===
Pos	Team	Pld	W	D	L	GF	GA	GD	Pts	Qualification	CIA	BRA	AVE	NOV	HER	CON	BAR	CAS
1	(Paraná (state)) Cianorte	14	6	4	4	14	12	+2	22	Advance to round of 32		1–0	3–1	1–2	0–0	1–1	1–1	1–1
2	(Rio Grande do Sul) Brasil de Pelotas	14	6	3	5	17	14	+3	21	Advance to round of 32	1–2		4–0	3–1	0–1	2–1	1–0	1–0
3	(Rio Grande do Sul) Avenida	14	5	4	5	14	19	−5	19	Advance to round of 32	1–0	2–0		2–1	0–0	1–0	1–1	1–2
4	(Rio Grande do Sul) Novo Hamburgo	14	4	6	4	14	15	−1	18	Advance to round of 32	0–1	1–2	1–1		1–1	2–1	1–0	0–0
5	(Santa Catarina (state)) Hercílio Luz	14	3	9	2	11	10	+1	18		1–0	1–1	2–1	1–2		1–1	0–1	0–0
6	(Santa Catarina (state)) Concórdia	14	4	5	5	13	12	+1	17		2–0	2–0	1–2	1–1	1–1		1–0	1–0
7	(Santa Catarina (state)) Barra	14	3	7	4	15	12	+3	16		0–1	2–2	1–1	1–1	2–2	0–0		3–0
8	(Paraná (state)) FC Cascavel	14	3	6	5	8	12	−4	15		1–2	0–0	3–0	0–0	0–0	1–0	0–3	

Source: CBF
Rules for classification: 1) points; 2) wins; 3) goal difference; 4) goals scored; 5) head-to-head results (only between 2 teams); 6) fewest red cards; 7) fewest yellow cards; 8) draw.

== Final stages ==
The final stages were played on a home-and-away two-legged basis. For the round of 16, semi-finals and finals, the best-overall-performance team hosted the second leg. If tied on aggregate, the away goals rule would not be used, extra time would not be played, and the penalty shoot-out would be used to determine the winners (Regulations Article 20).

For the quarter-finals, teams were seeded based on the table of results of all matches in the competition. The top four seeded teams hosted the second leg.

The four quarter-finals winners were promoted to 2025 Série C.

=== Round of 32 ===
The round of 32 was a two-legged knockout tie, with the draw regionalised. The matches were played from 27 July to 4 August.

==== Matches ====
Team 1	Agg.	Team 2	1st leg	2nd leg
Tocantinópolis (Tocantins)	2–5	(Amazonas (Brazilian state)) Manauara	0–0	2–5
Princesa do Solimões (Amazonas (Brazilian state))	1–1 (4–5 p)	(Piauí) Altos	1–1	0–0
Manaus (Amazonas (Brazilian state))	1–1 (6–5 p)	Maranhão	1–1	0–0
River (Piauí)	2–2 (4–5 p)	(Rondônia) Porto Velho	2–2	0–0
ASA (Alagoas)	1–4	(Paraíba) Treze	1–1	0–3
América de Natal (Rio Grande do Norte)	1–1 (6–7 p)	(Pernambuco) Retrô	1–1	0–0
Atlético Cearense (Ceará)	1–3	(Sergipe) Itabaiana	1–0	0–3
Jacuipense (Bahia)	1–2	(Ceará) Iguatu	0–0	1–2
Real Noroeste (Espírito Santo)	2–4	(Federal District (Brazil)) Brasiliense	0–2	2–2
Mixto (Mato Grosso)	0–2	(Rio de Janeiro (state)) Portuguesa	0–0	0–2
CRAC (Goiás)	2–3	(Rio de Janeiro (state)) Nova Iguaçu	0–1	2–2
Itabuna (Bahia)	1–3	(Goiás) Anápolis	1–0	0–3
Novo Hamburgo (Rio Grande do Sul)	2–5	(Paraná (state)) Maringá	2–4	0–1
Água Santa (São Paulo (state))	1–5	(Rio Grande do Sul) Brasil de Pelotas	1–2	0–3
Costa Rica (Mato Grosso do Sul)	2–5	(Paraná (state)) Cianorte	1–3	1–2
Avenida (Rio Grande do Sul)	1–1 (7–8 p)	(São Paulo (state)) Inter de Limeira	0–0	1–1

=== Round of 16 ===
The matches were played from 10 to 18 August.

==== Matches ====
Team 1	Agg.	Team 2	1st leg	2nd leg
Retrô (Pernambuco)	2–2 (4–1 p)	(Amazonas (Brazilian state)) Manauara	2–0	0–2
Altos (Piauí)	2–2 (3–5 p)	(Paraíba) Treze	0–1	2–1
Manaus (Amazonas (Brazilian state))	3–4	(Ceará) Iguatu	2–2	1–2
Itabaiana (Sergipe)	3–3 (4–2 p)	(Rondônia) Porto Velho	2–2	1–1
Brasil de Pelotas (Rio Grande do Sul)	1–9	(Federal District (Brazil)) Brasiliense	1–4	0–5
Portuguesa (Rio de Janeiro (state))	2–6	(Paraná (state)) Maringá	1–3	1–3
Inter de Limeira (São Paulo (state))	1–0	(Rio de Janeiro (state)) Nova Iguaçu	0–0	1–0
Cianorte (Paraná (state))	2–3	(Goiás) Anápolis	1–2	1–1

=== Quarter-finals ===
The draw for the quarter-finals was seeded based on the table of results of all matches in the competition for the qualifying teams. The teams were ranked according to points. If tied on points, the following criteria would be used to determine the ranking: 1. Wins; 2. Goal difference; 3. Goals scored; 4. Fewest red cards; 5. Fewest yellow cards; 6. Draw in the headquarters of the Brazilian Football Confederation (Regulations Article 17).

==== Quarter-finals seedings ====
Seed	Team	Pts	W	GD
1	(Paraná (state)) Maringá	44	14	+22
2	(Federal District (Brazil)) Brasiliense	42	13	+27
3	(Paraíba) Treze	38	11	+22
4	(Ceará) Iguatu	35	10	+8
5	(Goiás) Anápolis	32	9	+11
6	(Sergipe) Itabaiana	31	9	+12
7	(Pernambuco) Retrô	31	9	+9
8	(São Paulo (state)) Inter de Limeira	30	8	+10

==== Matches ====
The matches were played from 24 August to 1 September.

Team 1	Agg.	Team 2	1st leg	2nd leg
Inter de Limeira (São Paulo (state))	1–2	(Paraná (state)) Maringá	0–1	1–1
Anápolis (Goiás)	4–4 (5–4 p)	(Ceará) Iguatu	1–1	3–3
Retrô (Pernambuco)	1–1 (3–2 p)	(Federal District (Brazil)) Brasiliense	1–0	0–1
Itabaiana (Sergipe)	3–1	(Paraíba) Treze	3–1	0–0

=== Semi-finals ===
The matches were played from 8 to 15 September.

==== Matches ====
Team 1	Agg.	Team 2	1st leg	2nd leg
Anápolis (Goiás)	1–1 (5–4 p)	(Paraná (state)) Maringá	1–1	0–0
Retrô (Pernambuco)	1–1 (4–3 p)	(Sergipe) Itabaiana	0–1	1–0

=== Finals ===
The matches were played from 22 to 29 September.

==== Matches ====
Team 1	Agg.	Team 2	1st leg	2nd leg
Anápolis (Goiás)	3–4	(Pernambuco) Retrô	2–1	1–3

22 September 2024
16:00

Anápolis (Goiás)	2–1	(Pernambuco) Retrô
Kevyn 10'; Breno Santos 86'	Report	Denílson 28'

Estádio Jonas Duarte, Anápolis
Attendance: 6,139
Referee: João Vitor Gobi (São Paulo)

29 September 2024
16:00

Retrô (Pernambuco)	3–1	(Goiás) Anápolis
Júnior Fialho 12'; Mascote 49'; João Pedro 67'	Report	Magno 21'

Arena Pernambuco, São Lourenço da Mata
Attendance: 9,721
Referee: Luiz Flávio de Oliveira (São Paulo)

== Top goalscorers ==
Rank	Player	Team	Goals
1	(Brazil) Thiaguinho	(Paraíba) Treze	10
2	(Russia) Ari	(Ceará) Atlético Cearense	9
2	(Brazil) Mascote	(Pernambuco) Retrô	9
4	(Brazil) Luan Viana	(Rondônia) Porto Velho	8
4	(Brazil) Romarinho	(Amazonas (Brazilian state)) Manauara	8
4	(Brazil) Weslley Smith	(Piauí) Fluminense	8
7	(Brazil) Cleiton	(Sergipe) Itabaiana	7
7	(Brazil) Felipe Pará	(Piauí) River	7
7	(Brazil) Otacílio Marcos	(Ceará) Iguatu	7
7	(Brazil) Thiago Alagoano	(Paraíba) Treze	7

Source: CBF
