= Gerson (footballer, born 1981) =

Brazilian footballer (born 1981)

Personal information
- Full name: José Gerson Ramos
- Date of birth: 29 March 1981 (age 45)
- Place of birth: Carmópolis, Brazil
- Height: 1.74 m (5 ft 9 in)
- Position: Midfielder

Team information
- Current team: Juventude (assistant)

Youth career
- 2002–2003: Camaçariense

Senior career*
Years	Team	Apps	(Gls)
2004	Camaçariense		
2005	Catuense		
2005–2006	Mogi Mirim		
2006–2007	Paraná		
2007–2008	Atlético Mineiro	34	(1)
2008–2009	São Caetano	33	(3)
2010	Mirassol	16	(1)
2010–2012	Ponte Preta	61	(4)
2013	Atlético Sorocaba	10	(1)
2013	Cuiabá	1	(0)
2014	Rio Branco-SP	12	(0)
2014	Audax Rio	0	(0)
2015	Caldas Novas	2	(0)
2015	Rio Verde	4	(0)
2015–2016	Audax Rio	23	(7)
2017	São José dos Campos	10	(0)

Managerial career
- 2018: Primavera (assistant)
- 2019–2021: Real Brasília U20
- 2020–2021: Real Brasília (women) (assistant)
- 2021: ARUC
- 2022: Real Brasília U20
- 2022: Royal
- 2023: Real Brasília
- 2023: Trindade
- 2024: Samambaia
- 2024–: Juventude (assistant)
- 2025: Juventude (interim)
- * Club domestic league appearances and goals

José Gerson Ramos (born 29 March 1981), commonly known as Gerson, is a Brazilian football coach and former player who played as a midfielder. He is the current assistant coach of Juventude.

== Playing career ==
Born in Carmópolis, Sergipe, Gerson began his career with Camaçariense, and later played for Catuense before joining Mogi Mirim in 2005. In April of the following year, he moved to Paraná.

On 24 July 2007, Gerson and Paraná teammate Xaves joined Atlético Mineiro. Regularly used under head coach Zetti, he subsequently lost his starting spot, and would feature mainly as a right-back during the 2008 season before rescinding his contract on 27 May of that year.

Shortly after leaving Galo, Gerson signed for São Caetano. In December 2009, after falling down the pecking order, he was transferred to Mirassol

On 19 April 2010, Gerson was presented at Ponte Preta. In December, he renewed his contract for a further year, and featured regularly in the 2011 campaign.

In December 2012, Gerson agreed to a deal with Atlético Sorocaba for the upcoming season. He moved to Cuiabá on 21 August 2013, but only played once and signed for Rio Branco-SP on 2 November.

Gerson would feature in the lower leagues in the remainder of his career, representing Audax Rio (two stints), Caldas Novas, Rio Verde and São José dos Campos. He retired with the latter in 2017, aged 36.

== Coaching career ==
On 17 May 2018, Gerson moved to Primavera as an assistant coach. In the following year, he joined Real Brasília, where he worked as an under-20 coach and as an assistant of the women's team.

In September 2021, Gerson became the head coach of ARUC after the club established a partnership with Real Brasília. Back to the latter club for the 2022 season, he would later take over Royal.

Ahead of the 2023 campaign, Gerson became the head coach of Real Brasília's first team. He led the club to the 2023 Campeonato Brasiliense title, but left on 15 May 2023.

On 18 July 2023, Gerson was announced as head coach of Trindade in the Campeonato Goiano Terceira Divisão, but left the club before the start of the competition. On 20 November, he took over Samambaia, but left on 2 January 2024, before coaching in a single match, after receiving an offer from Juventude to become an assistant.

On 29 September 2024, Gerson led Ju in a 1–1 home draw against Red Bull Bragantino, as head coach Jair Ventura was suspended. He remained an assistant until August of the following year, when he was named interim head coach after the dismissal of Cláudio Tencati.

== Honours ==
=== Coach ===
Real Brasília

- Campeonato Brasiliense: 2023
