= 2024 Copa Verde =

11th edition of a Brazilian association football competition

Tournament details
- Country: Brazil
- Dates: 22 February – 29 May
- Teams: 24

Final positions
- Champions: (Pará) Paysandu (4th title)
- Runners-up: (Goiás) Vila Nova

Tournament statistics
- Matches played: 30
- Goals scored: 93 (3.1 per match)
- Top goal scorer(s): (Brazil) Nicolas (6 goals)

The 2024 Copa Verde was the 11th edition of the football competition held in Brazil. Featuring 24 clubs, Acre, Amazonas, Distrito Federal, Espírito Santo, Goiás, Mato Grosso, Pará and Tocantins have two vacancies; Amapá, Mato Grosso do Sul, Rondônia and Roraima with one each. The others four berths was set according to CBF ranking.

In the finals, Paysandu defeated Vila Nova 10–0 on aggregate to win their fourth title and a place in the third round of the 2025 Copa do Brasil.

== Qualified teams ==
Association	Team	Qualification method
(Acre (state)) Acre; 2 berths	Rio Branco	2023 Campeonato Acreano champions
(Acre (state)) Acre; 2 berths	Humaitá	2023 Campeonato Acreano runners-up
(Amapá) Amapá; 1 berth	Trem	2023 Campeonato Amapaense champions
(Amazonas (Brazilian state)) Amazonas; 2+1 berths	Amazonas	2023 Campeonato Amazonense champions
(Amazonas (Brazilian state)) Amazonas; 2+1 berths	Manauara	2023 Campeonato Amazonense runners-up
(Amazonas (Brazilian state)) Amazonas; 2+1 berths	Manaus	3rd best placed team in the 2024 CBF ranking not already qualified
(Federal District (Brazil)) Distrito Federal; 2+1 berths	Real Brasília	2023 Campeonato Brasiliense champions
(Federal District (Brazil)) Distrito Federal; 2+1 berths	Brasiliense	2023 Campeonato Brasiliense runners-up
(Federal District (Brazil)) Distrito Federal; 2+1 berths	Ceilândia	4th best placed team in the 2024 CBF ranking not already qualified
(Espírito Santo) Espírito Santo; 2 berths	Real Noroeste	2023 Campeonato Capixaba champions
(Espírito Santo) Espírito Santo; 2 berths	Rio Branco	2023 Copa Espírito Santo runners-up
(Goiás) Goiás; 2+1 berths	Goiás	2023 Campeonato Goiano runners-up
(Goiás) Goiás; 2+1 berths	Anápolis	2023 Campeonato Goiano 4th place
(Goiás) Goiás; 2+1 berths	Vila Nova	1st best placed team in the 2024 CBF ranking not already qualified
(Mato Grosso) Mato Grosso; 2 berths	Cuiabá	2023 Campeonato Mato-Grossense champions
(Mato Grosso) Mato Grosso; 2 berths	União Rondonópolis	2023 Campeonato Mato-Grossense runners-up
(Mato Grosso do Sul) Mato Grosso do Sul; 1 berth	Costa Rica	2023 Campeonato Sul-Mato-Grossense champions
(Pará) Pará; 2+1 berths	Águia de Marabá	2023 Campeonato Paraense champions
(Pará) Pará; 2+1 berths	Remo	2023 Campeonato Paraense runners-up
(Pará) Pará; 2+1 berths	Paysandu	2nd best placed team in the 2024 CBF ranking not already qualified
(Rondônia) Rondônia; 1 berth	Porto Velho	2023 Campeonato Rondoniense champions
(Roraima) Roraima; 1 berth	São Raimundo	2023 Campeonato Roraimense champions
(Tocantins) Tocantins; 2 berths	Tocantinópolis	2023 Campeonato Tocantinense champions
(Tocantins) Tocantins; 2 berths	Capital	2023 Campeonato Tocantinense runners-up

== Schedule ==
The schedule of the competition is as follows.

Stage	First leg	Second leg
First round	22, 28 and 29 February 2024	
Round of 16	5, 6, 7 and 12 March 2024	
Quarter-finals	20 and 21 March 2024	23, 24 and 27 March 2024
Semi-finals	3 and 17 April 2024	10 April and 11 May 2024
Finals	22 May 2024	29 May 2024

== Bracket ==
First round
(Tocantins) Tocantinópolis	2
(Amazonas (Brazilian state)) Manauara	1
(Pará) Águia de Marabá	0
(Acre (state)) Rio Branco	2
(Acre (state)) Humaitá	1 (2)
(Amapá) Trem (p)	1 (4)
(Roraima) São Raimundo	3 (4)
(Tocantins) Capital (p)	3 (5)
(Espírito Santo) Real Noroeste	1
(Espírito Santo) Rio Branco	2
(Mato Grosso) União Rondonópolis	4
(Mato Grosso do Sul) Costa Rica	0
(Federal District (Brazil)) Ceilândia (p)	0 (4)
(Federal District (Brazil)) Real Brasília	0 (3)
(Rondônia) Porto Velho (p)	1 (5)
(Goiás) Anápolis	1 (3)

Round of 16
(Amazonas (Brazilian state)) Manaus	3
(Tocantins) Tocantinópolis	2
(Pará) Paysandu	3
(Acre (state)) Rio Branco	0
(Pará) Remo	3
(Amapá) Trem	1
(Amazonas (Brazilian state)) Amazonas	4
(Tocantins) Capital	1
(Goiás) Vila Nova	1
(Espírito Santo) Rio Branco	0
Goiás	2
(Mato Grosso) União Rondonópolis	0
(Federal District (Brazil)) Brasiliense (p)	0 (4)
(Federal District (Brazil)) Ceilândia	0 (1)
(Mato Grosso) Cuiabá	5
(Rondônia) Porto Velho	0

Quarter-finals
(Amazonas (Brazilian state)) Manaus	1	1	2
(Pará) Paysandu	0	4	4
(Pará) Remo	2	2	4
(Amazonas (Brazilian state)) Amazonas	1	2	3
(Goiás) Vila Nova	1	1	2
Goiás	0	1	1
(Federal District (Brazil)) Brasiliense	1	1	2
(Mato Grosso) Cuiabá	4	4	8

Semi-finals
(Pará) Paysandu (p)	0	1	1 (4)
(Pará) Remo	0	1	1 (3)
(Goiás) Vila Nova (p)	2	2	4 (4)
(Mato Grosso) Cuiabá	0	4	4 (2)

Finals
(Pará) Paysandu	6	4	10
(Goiás) Vila Nova	0	0	0

== Finals ==
22 May 2024
20:00 BRT (UTC−3)

Paysandu (Pará)	6–0	(Goiás) Vila Nova
García 6'; Nicolas 33', 55', 72'; Edílson 45+2'; Edinho 84'	Report

Estádio da Curuzu, Belém
Attendance: 13,052
Referee: Davi de Oliveira Lacerda

29 May 2024
20:00 BRT (UTC−3)

Vila Nova (Goiás)	0–4	(Pará) Paysandu
	Report	Nicolas 3'; João Vieira 39'; Vinícius Leite 71'; Edinho 83'

Estádio Olímpico Pedro Ludovico, Goiânia
Attendance: 426
Referee: Angleison Marcos Vieira Monteiro

Paysandu won 10–0 on aggregate.
