= 2023 in Brazilian football =

Football in Brazil
- Season: 2023

Men's football
- Série A: Palmeiras
- Série B: Vitória
- Série C: Amazonas
- Série D: Ferroviário
- Copa do Brasil: São Paulo
- Supercopa: Palmeiras

Women's football
- Série A1: Corinthians
- Série A2: Red Bull Bragantino
- Série A3: Mixto
- Supercopa Feminina: Corinthians

The following article presents a summary of the 2023 football (soccer) season in Brazil, which was the 122nd season of competitive football in the country.

== Campeonato Brasileiro Série A ==
The 2023 Campeonato Brasileiro Série A started on 15 April 2023 and ended on 6 December 2023.

- América Mineiro
- Athletico Paranaense
- Atlético Mineiro
- Bahia
- Botafogo
- Corinthians
- Coritiba
- Cruzeiro
- Cuiabá
- Flamengo
- Fluminense
- Fortaleza
- Goiás
- Grêmio
- Internacional
- Palmeiras
- Red Bull Bragantino
- Santos
- São Paulo
- Vasco da Gama

Pos	Team	Pld	W	D	L	GF	GA	GD	Pts	Qualification or relegation
1	Palmeiras (C)	38	20	10	8	64	33	+31	70	Qualification for Copa Libertadores group stage
2	Grêmio	38	21	5	12	63	56	+7	68	Qualification for Copa Libertadores group stage
3	Atlético Mineiro	38	19	9	10	52	32	+20	66	Qualification for Copa Libertadores group stage
4	Flamengo	38	19	9	10	56	42	+14	66	Qualification for Copa Libertadores group stage
5	Botafogo	38	18	10	10	58	37	+21	64	Qualification for Copa Libertadores second stage
6	Red Bull Bragantino	38	17	11	10	49	35	+14	62	Qualification for Copa Libertadores second stage
7	Fluminense	38	16	8	14	51	47	+4	56	Qualification for Copa Libertadores group stage (Note: Fluminense qualified for the Copa Libertadores group stage by winning the 2023 Copa Libertadores.)
8	Athletico Paranaense	38	14	14	10	51	43	+8	56	Qualification for Copa Sudamericana group stage
9	Internacional	38	15	10	13	46	45	+1	55	Qualification for Copa Sudamericana group stage
10	Fortaleza	38	15	9	14	45	44	+1	54	Qualification for Copa Sudamericana group stage
11	São Paulo	38	14	11	13	40	38	+2	53	Qualification for Copa Libertadores group stage (Note: São Paulo qualified for the Copa Libertadores group stage by winning the 2023 Copa do Brasil.)
12	Cuiabá	38	14	9	15	40	39	+1	51	Qualification for Copa Sudamericana group stage
13	Corinthians	38	12	14	12	47	48	−1	50	Qualification for Copa Sudamericana group stage
14	Cruzeiro	38	11	14	13	35	32	+3	47	Qualification for Copa Sudamericana group stage
15	Vasco da Gama	38	12	9	17	41	51	−10	45	
16	Bahia	38	12	8	18	50	53	−3	44	
17	Santos (R)	38	11	10	17	39	64	−25	43	Relegation to Campeonato Brasileiro Série B
18	Goiás (R)	38	9	11	18	36	53	−17	38	Relegation to Campeonato Brasileiro Série B
19	Coritiba (R)	38	8	6	24	41	73	−32	30	Relegation to Campeonato Brasileiro Série B
20	América Mineiro (R)	38	5	9	24	42	81	−39	24	Relegation to Campeonato Brasileiro Série B

Source: CBF
Rules for classification: 1) points; 2) wins; 3) goal difference; 4) goals scored; 5) head-to-head results (only between two teams); 6) fewest red cards; 7) fewest yellow cards; 8) drawing of lots.
(C) Champions; (R) Relegated
Notes:

Palmeiras won the league.

=== Relegation ===
The four worst placed teams, América Mineiro, Coritiba, Goiás and Santos, were relegated to the following year's second level.

== Campeonato Brasileiro Série B ==
The 2023 Campeonato Brasileiro Série B started on 14 April 2023 and ended on 25 November 2023.

- ABC
- Atlético Goianiense
- Avaí
- Botafogo (SP)
- Ceará
- Chapecoense
- CRB
- Criciúma
- Guarani
- Ituano
- Juventude
- Londrina
- Mirassol
- Novorizontino
- Ponte Preta
- Sampaio Corrêa
- Sport
- Tombense
- Vila Nova
- Vitória

Pos	Team	Pld	W	D	L	GF	GA	GD	Pts	Promotion or relegation
1	Vitória (C, P)	38	22	6	10	50	31	+19	72	Promotion to 2024 Campeonato Brasileiro Série A
2	Juventude (P)	38	18	11	9	42	31	+11	65	Promotion to 2024 Campeonato Brasileiro Série A
3	Criciúma (P)	38	19	7	12	45	33	+12	64	Promotion to 2024 Campeonato Brasileiro Série A
4	Atlético Goianiense (P)	38	17	13	8	56	45	+11	64	Promotion to 2024 Campeonato Brasileiro Série A
5	Novorizontino	38	19	6	13	48	30	+18	63	
6	Mirassol	38	18	9	11	42	31	+11	63	
7	Sport	38	17	12	9	59	40	+19	63	
8	Vila Nova	38	17	10	11	49	30	+19	61	
9	CRB	38	16	9	13	45	39	+6	57	
10	Guarani	38	15	12	11	42	33	+9	57	
11	Ceará	38	13	11	14	40	45	−5	50	
12	Botafogo-SP	38	12	11	15	25	42	−17	47	
13	Avaí	38	10	14	14	31	48	−17	44	
14	Ituano	38	9	15	14	33	38	−5	42	
15	Ponte Preta	38	9	15	14	24	35	−11	42	
16	Chapecoense	38	9	13	16	38	43	−5	40	
17	Sampaio Corrêa (R)	38	8	15	15	31	43	−12	39	Relegation to 2024 Campeonato Brasileiro Série C
18	Tombense (R)	38	9	10	19	37	50	−13	37	Relegation to 2024 Campeonato Brasileiro Série C
19	Londrina (R)	38	7	10	21	31	58	−27	31	Relegation to 2024 Campeonato Brasileiro Série C
20	ABC (R)	38	5	13	20	28	51	−23	28	Relegation to 2024 Campeonato Brasileiro Série C

Source: CBF
Rules for classification: 1) points; 2) wins; 3) goal difference; 4) goals scored; 5) head-to-head results (only between 2 teams); 6) fewest red cards; 7) fewest yellow cards; 8) drawing of lots.
(C) Champions; (P) Promoted; (R) Relegated

Vitória won the league.

=== Promotion ===
The four best placed teams, Vitória, Criciúma, Juventude and Atlético Goianiense, were promoted to the following year's first level.

=== Relegation ===
The four worst placed teams, ABC, Londrina, Sampaio Corrêa and Tombense, were relegated to the following year's third level.

== Campeonato Brasileiro Série C ==
The 2023 Campeonato Brasileiro Série C started on 2 May 2023 and ended on 22 October 2023.

- Altos
- Amazonas
- América de Natal
- Aparecidense
- Botafogo (PB)
- Brusque
- Confiança
- CSA
- Figueirense
- Floresta
- Manaus
- Náutico
- Operário Ferroviário
- Paysandu
- Pouso Alegre
- Remo
- São Bernardo
- São José (RS)
- Volta Redonda
- Ypiranga (RS)

The Campeonato Brasileiro Série C final was played between Brusque and Amazonas.

15 October 2023

Amazonas	0–0	Brusque

Arena da Amazônia, Manaus

22 October 2023

Brusque	1–2	Amazonas

Estádio Augusto Bauer, Brusque

Amazonas won the league after beating Brusque.

=== Promotion ===
The four best placed teams, Brusque, Amazonas, Paysandu and Operário Ferroviário, were promoted to the following year's second level.

=== Relegation ===
The four worst placed teams, Pouso Alegre, Altos, América de Natal and Manaus, were relegated to the following year's fourth level.

== Campeonato Brasileiro Série D ==
The 2023 Campeonato Brasileiro Série D started on 6 May 2023 and ended on 16 September 2023.

- Águia de Marabá
- Aimoré
- Anápolis
- ASA
- Athletic
- Atlético Cearense
- Atlético de Alagoinhas
- Bahia de Feira
- Brasil de Pelotas
- Brasiliense
- Camboriú
- Campinense
- Caucaia
- Caxias
- Ceilândia
- CEOV
- Concórdia
- Cordino
- CRAC
- Cruzeiro de Arapiraca
- Democrata GV
- Falcon
- FC Cascavel
- Ferroviária
- Ferroviário
- Fluminense (PI)
- Globo
- Hercílio Luz
- Humaitá
- Iguatu
- Inter de Limeira
- Interporto
- Iporá
- Jacuipense
- Maranhão
- Maringá
- Nacional (AM)
- Nacional de Patos
- Nova Iguaçu
- Novo Hamburgo
- Operário
- Pacajus
- Parnahyba
- Patrocinense
- Portuguesa (RJ)
- Potiguar de Mossoró
- Princesa do Solimões
- Real Ariquemes
- Real Noroeste
- Resende
- Retrô
- Santa Cruz
- Santo André
- São Francisco
- São Joseense
- São Raimundo (RR)
- Sergipe
- Sousa
- Tocantinópolis
- Trem
- Tuna Luso
- União Rondonópolis
- Vitória (ES)
- XV de Piracicaba

Caldense and Villa Nova declined to participate in the Série D. They were replaced by Patrocinense.

The Campeonato Brasileiro Série D final was played between Ferroviária and Ferroviário.

13 September 2023

Ferroviária	0–0	Ferroviário

Fonte Luminosa, Araraquara

16 September 2023

Ferroviário	2–1	Ferroviária

Estádio Presidente Vargas, Fortaleza

Ferroviário won the league after defeating Ferroviária.

=== Promotion ===
The four best placed teams, Caxias, Athletic, Ferroviária and Ferroviário, were promoted to the following year's third level.

== Super cup ==
=== Supercopa do Brasil ===
The 2023 Supercopa do Brasil was played on 28 January 2023 between Palmeiras and Flamengo.

28 January 2023

Palmeiras	4–3	Flamengo

Arena BRB Mané Garrincha, Brasília

Palmeiras won the super cup after defeating Flamengo.

== Domestic cups ==
=== Copa do Brasil ===
The 2023 Copa do Brasil started on 21 February 2023 and ended on 24 September 2023. The Copa do Brasil final was played between São Paulo and Flamengo.

17 September 2023

Flamengo	0–1	São Paulo

Maracanã, Rio de Janeiro

24 September 2023

São Paulo	1–1	Flamengo

Estádio do Morumbi, São Paulo

São Paulo won the cup after defeating Flamengo.

=== Copa do Nordeste ===
The competition featured 16 clubs from the Northeastern region. It started on 21 January 2023 and ended on 3 May 2023. The Copa do Nordeste final was played between Ceará and Sport.

19 April 2023

Ceará	2–1	Sport

Castelão, Fortaleza

3 May 2023

Sport	1–0	Ceará
Penalties
	2–4

Estádio Ilha do Retiro, Recife

Ceará won the cup after defeating Sport.

=== Copa Verde ===
The competition featured 24 clubs from the North and Central-West regions, including two teams from Espírito Santo. It started on 17 February 2023 and ended on 31 May 2023. The Copa Verde final was played between Goiás and Paysandu.

17 May 2023

Paysandu	0–2	Goiás

Mangueirão, Belém

31 May 2023

Goiás	2–1	Paysandu

Estádio da Serrinha, Goiânia

Goiás won the cup after defeating Paysandu.

== State championship champions ==
State	Champions
(Acre (state)) Acre	Rio Branco
Alagoas	CRB
Amapá	Trem
(Amazonas (Brazilian state)) Amazonas	Amazonas
Bahia	Bahia
Ceará	Fortaleza
(Federal District (Brazil)) Distrito Federal	Real Brasília
Espírito Santo	Real Noroeste
Goiás	Atlético Goianiense
Maranhão	Maranhão
Mato Grosso	Cuiabá
Mato Grosso do Sul	Costa Rica
Minas Gerais	Atlético Mineiro
Pará	Águia de Marabá
Paraíba	Treze
(Paraná (state)) Paraná	Athletico Paranaense
Pernambuco	Sport
Piauí	River
(Rio de Janeiro (state)) Rio de Janeiro	Fluminense
Rio Grande do Norte	América de Natal
Rio Grande do Sul	Grêmio
Rondônia	Porto Velho
Roraima	São Raimundo
(Santa Catarina (state)) Santa Catarina	Criciúma
(São Paulo (state)) São Paulo	Palmeiras
Sergipe	Itabaiana
Tocantins	Tocantinópolis

== State championship second division champions ==
State	Champions
(Acre (state)) Acre	No second division
Alagoas	Penedense
Amapá	No second division
(Amazonas (Brazilian state)) Amazonas	Unidos do Alvorada
Bahia	Jequié
Ceará	Horizonte
(Federal District (Brazil)) Distrito Federal	Ceilandense
Espírito Santo	Jaguaré
Goiás	Goiatuba
Maranhão	Tuntum
Mato Grosso	Primavera
Mato Grosso do Sul	Portuguesa
Minas Gerais	Itabirito
Pará	Canaã
Paraíba	Atlético Cajazeirense
(Paraná (state)) Paraná	Andraus
Pernambuco	Afogados
Piauí	Oeirense
(Rio de Janeiro (state)) Rio de Janeiro	Sampaio Corrêa
Rio Grande do Norte	Baraúnas
Rio Grande do Sul	Santa Cruz
Rondônia	Vilhena
Roraima	No second division
(Santa Catarina (state)) Santa Catarina	Nação
(São Paulo (state)) São Paulo	Ponte Preta
Sergipe	Carmópolis
Tocantins	Batalhão

Baraúnas (Rio Grande do Norte) were declared champions after the original champions, Mossoró, were disqualified.

== State cup competition champions ==
Competition	Champions
Copa Alagoas	CSE
Copa ES	Serra
Copa Fares Lopes	Iguatu
Copa FGF	São Luiz
Copa FMF	Mixto
Copa Paulista	Portuguesa Santista
Copa Rio	Portuguesa
Copa Santa Catarina	Marcílio Dias

== Youth competition champions ==
Competition	Champions
Campeonato Brasileiro Sub-20	Flamengo
Copa do Brasil Sub-20	Cruzeiro
Campeonato Brasileiro Sub-17	Palmeiras
Copa do Brasil Sub-17^{(1)}	Palmeiras
Copa São Paulo de Futebol Júnior	Palmeiras
Copa 2 de Julho Sub-15	Atlético Mineiro

^{(1)} The Copa Nacional do Espírito Santo Sub-17, between 2008 and 2012, was named Copa Brasil Sub-17. The similar named Copa do Brasil Sub-17 is organized by the Brazilian Football Confederation and it was first played in 2013.

== Brazilian clubs in international competitions ==
Team	2023 Copa Libertadores	2023 Copa Sudamericana	2023 Recopa Sudamericana	2023 FIFA Club World Cup
América Mineiro	N/A	Quarter-finals eliminated by (Brazil) Fortaleza	N/A	N/A
Athletico Paranaense	Round of 16 eliminated by (Bolivia) Bolívar	N/A	N/A	N/A
Atlético Mineiro	Round of 16 eliminated by (Brazil) Palmeiras	N/A	N/A	N/A
Botafogo	N/A	Quarter-finals eliminated by (Argentina) Defensa y Justicia	N/A	N/A
Corinthians	Eliminated in the Group Stage	Semi-finals eliminated by (Brazil) Fortaleza	N/A	N/A
Flamengo	Round of 16 eliminated by (Paraguay) Olimpia	N/A	Runners-up lost to (Ecuador) Independiente del Valle	N/A
Fluminense	Champions defeated (Argentina) Boca Juniors	N/A	N/A	Runners-up lost to (England) Manchester City
Fortaleza	Third Stage eliminated by (Paraguay) Cerro Porteño	Runners-up lost to (Ecuador) LDU Quito	N/A	N/A
Goiás	N/A	Round of 16 eliminated by (Argentina) Estudiantes	N/A	N/A
Internacional	Semi-finals eliminated by (Brazil) Fluminense	N/A	N/A	N/A
Palmeiras	Semi-finals eliminated by (Argentina) Boca Juniors	N/A	N/A	N/A
Red Bull Bragantino	N/A	Round of 16 eliminated by (Brazil) América Mineiro	N/A	N/A
Santos	N/A	Eliminated in the Group Stage	N/A	N/A
São Paulo	N/A	Quarter-finals eliminated by (Ecuador) LDU Quito	N/A	N/A

== National team ==
The following table lists all the games played by the Brazilian national team in official competitions and friendly matches during 2023.

=== Friendlies ===
25 March	Morocco	2–1	Brazil	Tangier, Morocco
22:00 UTC+0	Boufal 29'; Sabiri 79'	Report	Casemiro 67'	Stadium: Ibn Batouta Stadium; Referee: Sadok Selmi (Tunisia)

17 June	Brazil	4–1	Guinea	Cornellà–El Prat, Spain
21:30 UTC+2	Joelinton 26'; Rodrygo 28'; Éder Militão 47'; Vinícius Júnior 87' (pen.)	Report	Guirassy 35'	Stadium: Stage Front Stadium; Referee: Andris Treimanis (Latvia)

20 June	Brazil	2–4	Senegal	Lisbon, Portugal
20:00 UTC+1	Lucas Paquetá 10'; Marquinhos 57'	Report	H. Diallo 21'; Marquinhos 51' (o.g.); Mané 54', 90+6' (pen.)	Stadium: Estádio José Alvalade; Referee: Gustavo Correia (Portugal)

=== 2026 FIFA World Cup qualification ===
8 September	Brazil	5–1	Bolivia	Belém, Brazil
21:45 UTC−3	Rodrygo 24', 53'; Raphinha 47'; Neymar 61', 90+3'	Report	Ábrego 78'	Stadium: Mangueirão; Attendance: 48,183; Referee: Juan Gabriel Benítez (Paraguay)

12 September	Peru	0–1	Brazil	Lima, Peru
21:00 UTC−5		Report	Marquinhos 90'	Stadium: Estadio Nacional; Referee: Fernando Rapallini (Argentina)

12 October	Brazil	1–1	Venezuela	Cuiabá, Brazil
20:30 UTC−4	Gabriel Magalhães 50'	Report	Bello 85'	Stadium: Arena Pantanal; Attendance: 40,020; Referee: Kevin Ortega (Peru)

17 October	Uruguay	2–0	Brazil	Montevideo, Uruguay
21:00 UTC−3	Núñez 42'; De la Cruz 77'	Report		Stadium: Estadio Centenario; Referee: Alexis Herrera (Venezuela)

16 November	Colombia	2–1	Brazil	Barranquilla, Colombia
19:00 UTC−5	Díaz 75', 79'	Report	Gabriel Martinelli 4'	Stadium: Estadio Metropolitano Roberto Meléndez; Referee: Andrés Matonte (Uruguay)

21 November	Brazil	0–1	Argentina	Rio de Janeiro, Brazil
21:30 UTC+3		Report	Otamendi 63'	Stadium: Maracanã; Attendance: 68,138; Referee: Piero Maza (Chile)

== Women's football ==
=== Campeonato Brasileiro de Futebol Feminino Série A1 ===
The 2023 Campeonato Brasileiro de Futebol Feminino Série A1 started on 24 February 2023 and ended on 10 September 2023.

- Athletico Paranaense
- Atlético Mineiro
- Avaí
- Bahia
- Ceará
- Corinthians
- Cruzeiro
- Ferroviária
- Flamengo/Marinha
- Grêmio
- Internacional
- Palmeiras
- Real Ariquemes
- Real Brasília
- Santos
- São Paulo

The Campeonato Brasileiro de Futebol Feminino Série A1 final was played between Corinthians and Ferroviária.

7 September 2023

Ferroviária	0–0	Corinthians

Fonte Luminosa, Araraquara

10 September 2023

Corinthians	2–1	Ferroviária

Neo Química Arena, São Paulo

Corinthians won the league after defeating Ferroviária.

==== Relegation ====
The four worst placed teams, Ceará, Real Ariquemes, Athletico Paranaense and Bahia, were relegated to the following year's second level.

=== Campeonato Brasileiro de Futebol Feminino Série A2 ===
The 2023 Campeonato Brasileiro de Futebol Feminino Série A2 started on 15 April 2023 and ended on 10 July 2023.

- 3B da Amazônia
- América Mineiro
- Botafogo
- Botafogo (PB)
- CRESSPOM
- ESMAC
- Fluminense
- Fortaleza
- JC
- Minas/ICESP
- Red Bull Bragantino
- São José
- Sport
- AD Taubaté
- UDA
- Vila Nova/UNIVERSO

The Campeonato Brasileiro de Futebol Feminino Série A2 final was played between Fluminense and Red Bull Bragantino.

2 July 2023

Fluminense	0–3	Red Bull Bragantino

Estádio Luso Brasileiro, Rio de Janeiro

10 July 2023

Red Bull Bragantino	1–0	Fluminense

Estádio Nabi Abi Chedid, Bragança Paulista

Red Bull Bragantino won the league after defeating Fluminense.

==== Promotion ====
The four best placed teams, Botafogo, Red Bull Bragantino, América Mineiro and Fluminense, were promoted to the following year's first level.

==== Relegation ====
The four worst placed teams, CRESSPOM, ESMAC, Botafogo (PB) and Vila Nova/UNIVERSO, were relegated to the following year's third level.

=== Campeonato Brasileiro de Futebol Feminino Série A3 ===
The 2023 Campeonato Brasileiro de Futebol Feminino Série A3 started on 21 April 2023 and ended on 25 June 2023.

- Acauã
- Aliança/Goiás
- Assermurb
- Astro
- Capital
- CEFAMA
- Ceilândia
- Criciúma
- Doce Mel/Jequié EC
- Estanciano
- Guarani de Juazeiro
- IAPE
- Juventude
- Mixto
- Mixto (PB)
- Náutico
- Operário
- Pérolas Negras
- Pinda/Ferroviária
- Polivalente
- Recanto
- Remo
- São Bernardo
- São Raimundo (RR)
- Tarumã
- Tiradentes
- Toledo
- Uberlândia
- Vasco da Gama
- VF4
- Vila Nova (ES)
- Ypiranga (AP)

As the Federação Amazonense de Futebol suspended the Iranduba men's team for two years due to their possible involvement in match-fixing, the Iranduba women's team was expelled from the Série A3. They were replaced by VF4.
Originally, União/ABC (Rio Grande do Norte) and Porto Velho (Rondônia) qualified for the Série A3. However, CBF announced that 2022 Campeonato Potiguar Feminino and 2022 Campeonato Rondoniense Feminino did not meet the requirements as qualification tournaments. CBF awarded their berths, via Women's State Ranking, to Astro (Bahia) and Penarol (Amazonas). However, Penarol declined to participate and they were replaced by Tarumã (Amazonas).
As the 2022 Campeonato Amapaense Feminino was not played, the Federação Amapaense de Futebol granted the Amapá berth to Ypiranga (AP).
Atletas de Jesus (Goiás) declined to participate in the Série A3. They were replaced, via Women's State Ranking, by Ceilândia (Distrito Federal).

The Campeonato Brasileiro de Futebol Feminino Série A3 final was played between Remo and Mixto.

17 June 2023

Remo	0–2	Mixto

Baenão, Belém

25 June 2023

Mixto	2–0	Remo

Arena Pantanal, Cuiabá

Mixto won the league after defeating Remo.

==== Promotion ====
The four best placed teams, Mixto, Remo, Juventude and VF4, were promoted to the following year's second level.

=== Super cup ===
==== Supercopa do Brasil de Futebol Feminino ====
The competition featured 8 clubs chosen between the top-twelve 2022 Série A1 and the top-four 2022 Série A2, with only one team for state. It started on 4 February 2023 and ended on 12 February 2023. The Supercopa do Brasil de Futebol Feminino final was played between Flamengo/Marinha and Corinthians.

12 February 2023

Corinthians	4–1	Flamengo/Marinha

Neo Química Arena, São Paulo

Corinthians won the super cup after defeating Flamengo/Marinha.

=== Domestic competition champions ===
State	Champions
(Acre (state)) Acre	Atlético Acreano
Alagoas	UDA
Amapá	Ypiranga
(Amazonas (Brazilian state)) Amazonas	3B da Amazônia
Bahia	Bahia
Ceará	Ceará
(Federal District (Brazil)) Distrito Federal	Real Brasília
Espírito Santo	Vila Nova
Goiás	Aliança/Goiás
Maranhão	IAPE
Mato Grosso	Mixto
Mato Grosso do Sul	Operário
Minas Gerais	Cruzeiro
Pará	Remo
Paraíba	Mixto
(Paraná (state)) Paraná	Athletico Paranaense
Pernambuco	Sport
Piauí	Tiradentes
(Rio de Janeiro (state)) Rio de Janeiro	Flamengo/Marinha
Rio Grande do Norte	União
Rio Grande do Sul	Internacional
Rondônia	Porto Velho
Roraima	Rio Negro
(Santa Catarina (state)) Santa Catarina	Avaí
(São Paulo (state)) São Paulo	Corinthians
Sergipe	Confiança
Tocantins	Paraíso

=== State cup competition champions ===
Competition	Champions
Copa Paulista de Futebol Feminino	Ferroviária
Copa Rio de Futebol Feminino	Flamengo/Marinha

=== Youth competition champions ===
Competition	Champions
Campeonato Brasileiro de Futebol Feminino Sub-20	Internacional
Campeonato Brasileiro de Futebol Feminino Sub-17	Grêmio
Copa São Paulo de Futebol Feminino	Flamengo/Marinha

=== Brazilian clubs in international competitions ===
Team	2023 Copa Libertadores Femenina
Corinthians	Champions defeated (Brazil) Palmeiras
Internacional	Fourth place lost to (Colombia) Atlético Nacional/Formas Íntimas
Palmeiras	Runners-up lost to (Brazil) Corinthians

=== National team ===
The following table lists all the games played by the Brazil women's national football team in official competitions and friendly matches during 2023.

The Brazil women's national football team competed in the following competitions in 2023:

==== Friendlies ====
11 April	Germany	1–2	Brazil	Nuremberg, Germany
18:00 (CEST)	Brand 90+2'	Report	Tamires 11'; Ary Borges 39'	Stadium: Max-Morlock-Stadion; Attendance: 32,587; Referee: Esther Staubli (Switzerland)

2 July	Brazil	4–0	Chile	Brasília, Brazil
10:30 (BRT)	Gabi Nunes 4'; Duda Sampaio 28'; Luana 34'; Geyse 49'	Report		Stadium: Arena BRB Mané Garrincha; Attendance: 15,892; Referee: Anahí Fernández (Uruguay)

28 October	Canada	0–1	Brazil	Montreal, Canada
14:30 (EDT)		Report	Debinha 90+4'	Stadium: Saputo Stadium; Attendance: 19,619; Referee: Natalie Simon (United States)

31 October	Canada	2–0	Brazil	Halifax, Canada
19:30 (ADT)	Huitema 70'; Rose 89'	Report		Stadium: Wanderers Grounds; Attendance: 6,421; Referee: Alex Billeter (United States)

30 November	Brazil	4–3	Japan	São Paulo, Brazil
15:15 (BRT)	Bia Zaneratto 40', 63'; Gabi Portilho 61'; Priscila 90+6'	Report	Fujino 38'; Endō 85' (pen.); Mi. Tanaka 87'	Stadium: Neo Química Arena; Attendance: 7,429; Referee: María Victoria Daza (Colombia)

3 December	Brazil	0–2	Japan	São Paulo, Brazil
11:00 (BRT)		Report	Minami 16'; Mi. Tanaka 18'	Stadium: Estádio do Morumbi; Attendance: 13,020; Referee: Jenny Arias (Colombia)

6 December	Brazil	4–0	Nicaragua	Araraquara, Brazil
18:00 (BRT)	Gabi Nunes 16'; Marta 40'; Luana 64'; Aline Milene 67'	Report		Stadium: Fonte Luminosa; Attendance: 5,237; Referee: María Victoria Daza (Colombia)

==== 2023 SheBelieves Cup ====
16 February	Japan	0–1	Brazil	Orlando, United States
16:00 (EST)		Report	Debinha 72'	Stadium: Exploria Stadium; Attendance: 6,453; Referee: Tori Penso (United States)

19 February	Brazil	0–2	Canada	Nashville, United States
17:30 (CST)		Report	Gilles 31'; Viens 71'	Stadium: Geodis Park; Attendance: 6,502; Referee: Katja Koroleva (United States)

22 February	United States	2–1	Brazil	Frisco, United States
18:00 (CST)	Morgan 45+3'; Swanson 63'	Report	Ludmila 90'	Stadium: Toyota Stadium; Attendance: 17,784; Referee: Marie-Soleil Beaudoin (Canada)

==== 2023 Women's Finalissima ====
6 April	England	1–1 (4–2 p)	Brazil	London, England
19:45 (BST)	Toone 23'	Report	Andressa Alves 90+3'	Stadium: Wembley Stadium; Attendance: 83,132; Referee: Stéphanie Frappart (France)
	Penalties
	Stanway (penalty scored); Toone (penalty missed); Daly (penalty scored); Greenwood (penalty scored); Kelly (penalty scored)		(penalty scored) Adriana; (penalty missed) Tamires; (penalty missed) Rafaelle; (penalty scored) Kerolin

==== 2023 FIFA Women's World Cup ====
24 July Group F	Brazil	4–0	Panama	Adelaide, Australia
20:30 (ACST)	Ary Borges 19', 39', 70'; Bia Zaneratto 48'	Report		Stadium: Hindmarsh Stadium; Attendance: 13,142; Referee: Cheryl Foster (Wales)

29 July Group F	France	2–1	Brazil	Brisbane, Australia
20:00 (AEST)	Le Sommer 17'; Renard 83'	Report	Debinha 58'	Stadium: Lang Park; Attendance: 49,378; Referee: Kate Jacewicz (Australia)

2 August Group F	Jamaica	0–0	Brazil	Melbourne, Australia
20:00 (AEST)		Report		Stadium: Melbourne Rectangular Stadium; Attendance: 27,638; Referee: Esther Staubli (Switzerland)

Competition	Performance
SheBelieves Cup	Third place
Women's Finalissima	Runners-up lost to England
FIFA Women's World Cup	Eliminated in the Group Stage
