= Candangolândia =

- Administrative region
- Região Administrativa de Candangolândia; Administrative Region of Candangolândia
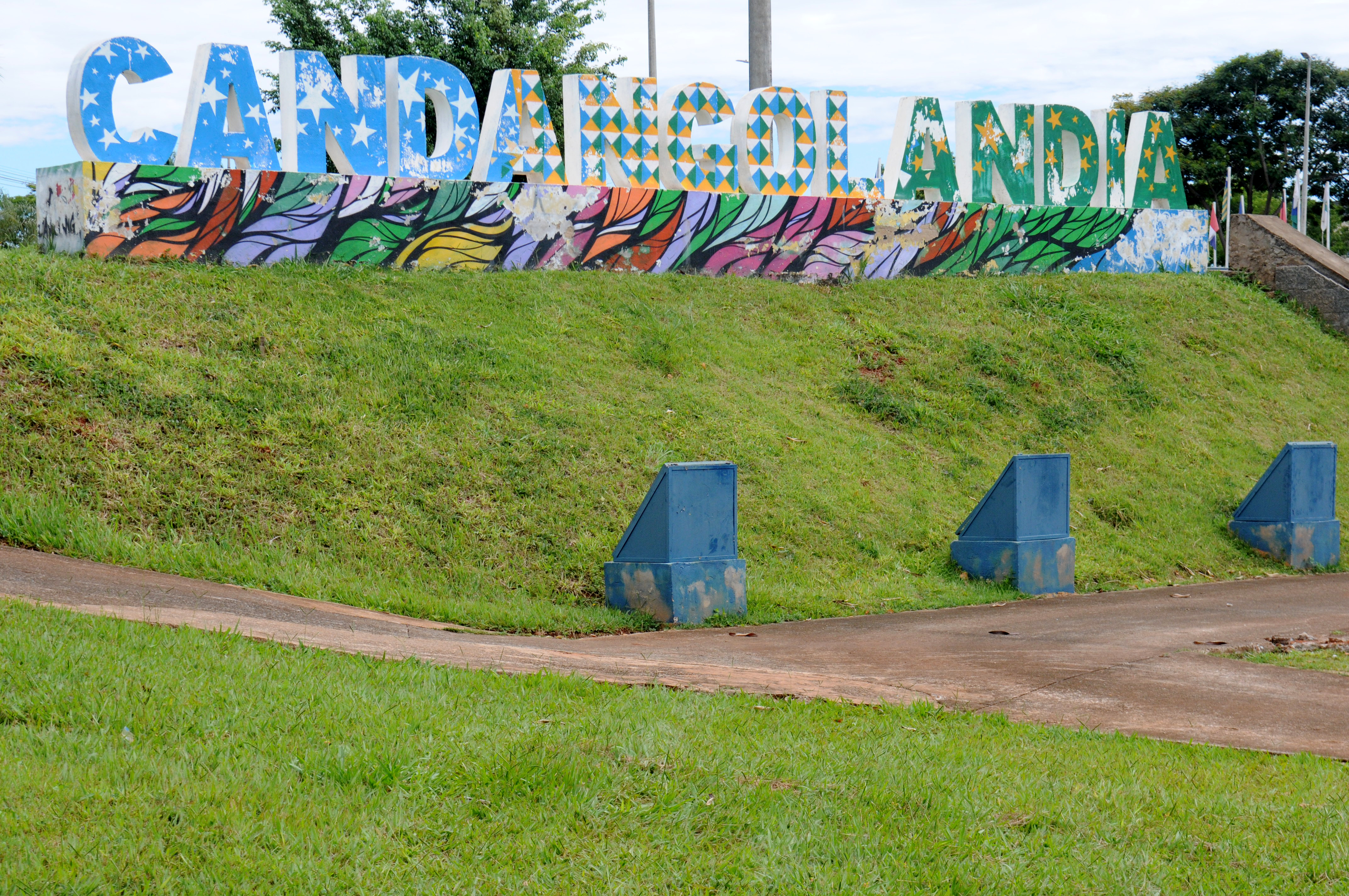
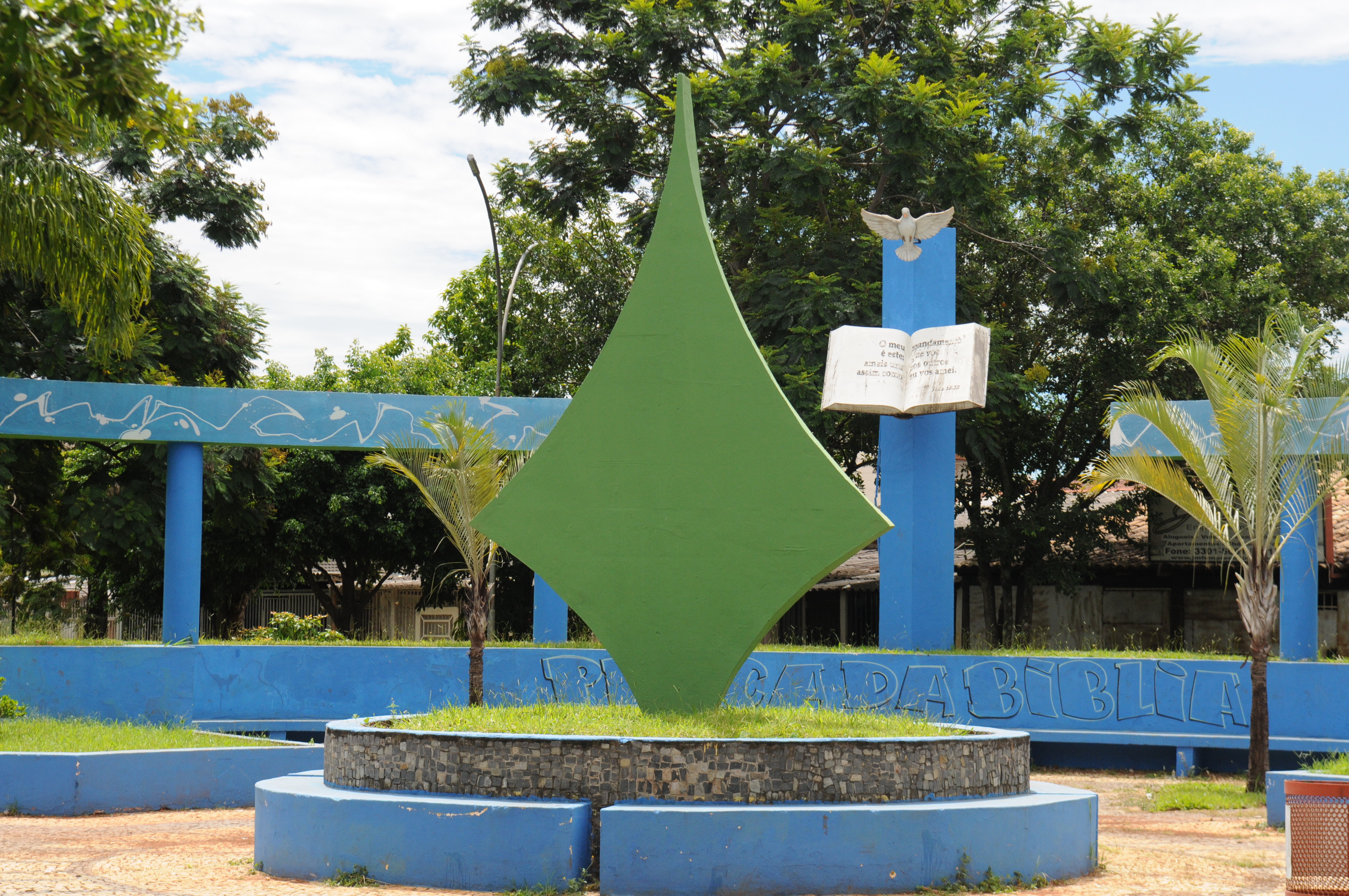
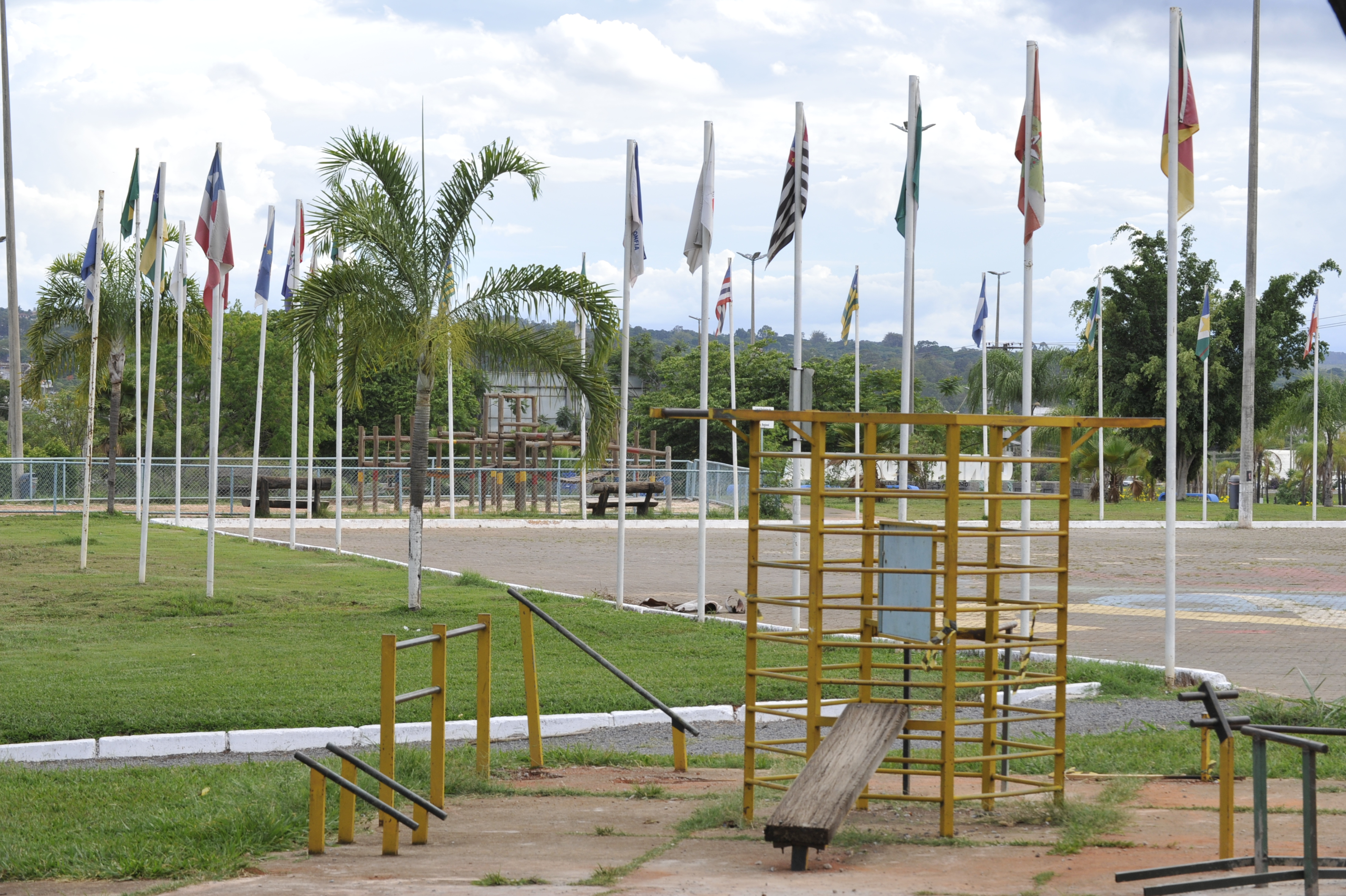
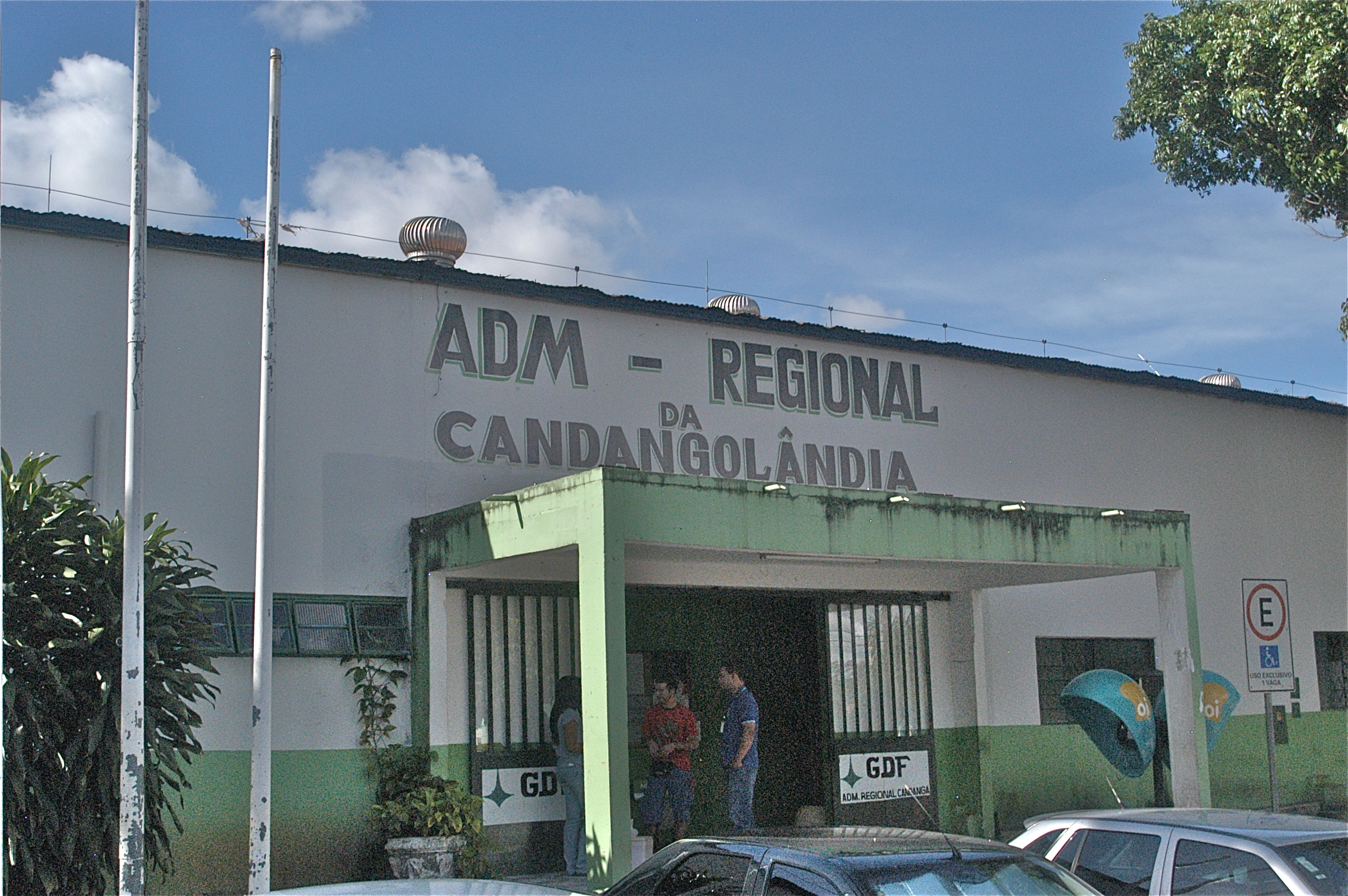
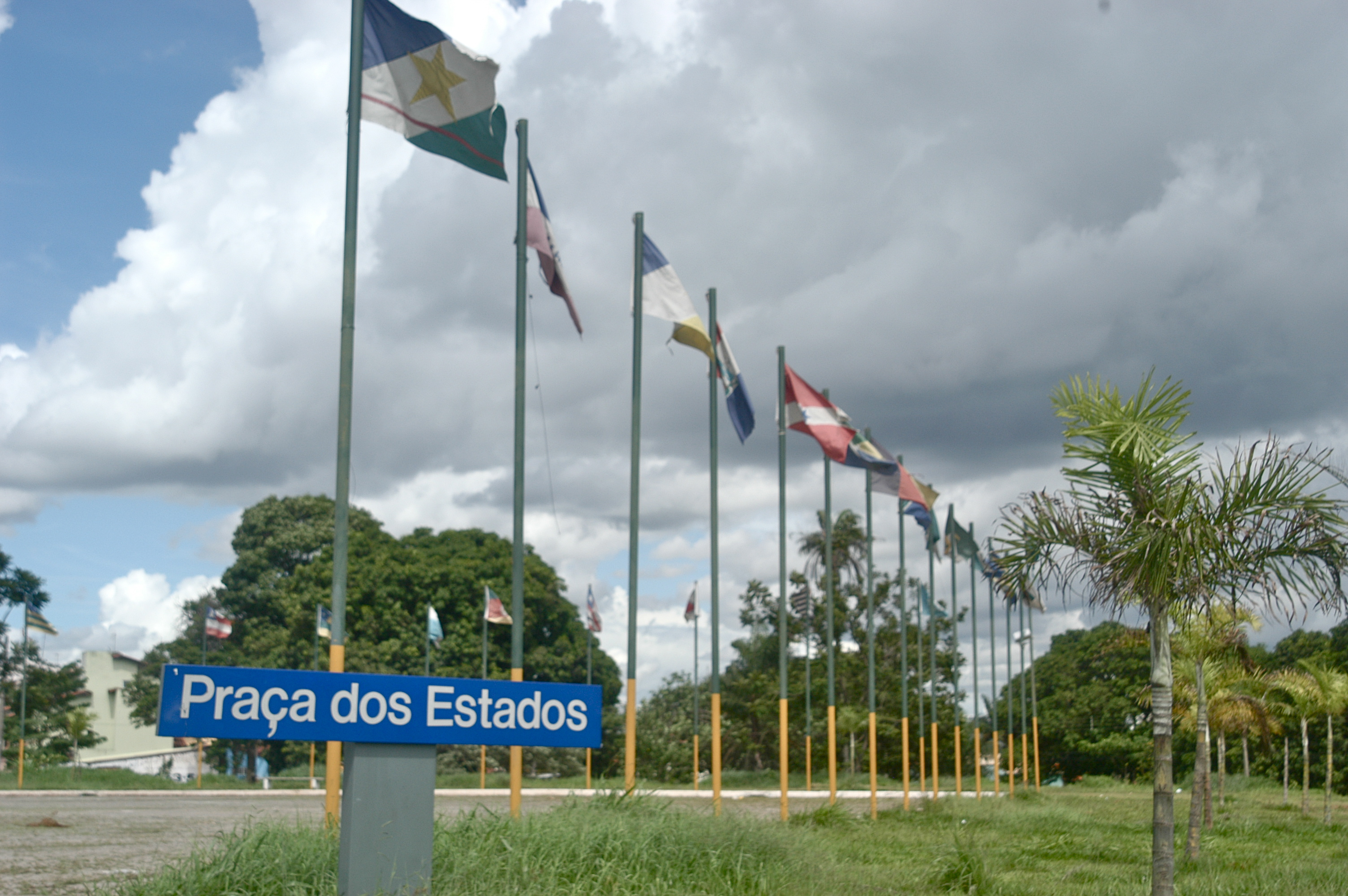
- Clockwise from top: Candangolândia sign, States' Park, Regional administration building, Sculpture in the shape of the coat of arms of the Federal District

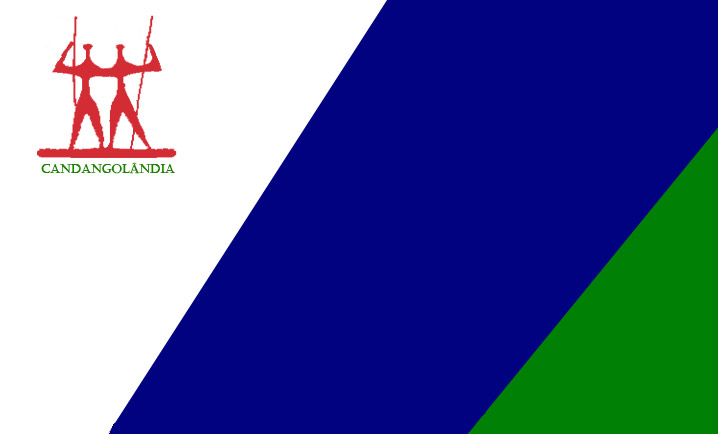
- Flag
- Nickname: Candanga
- Coordinates: 15°51′16″S 47°57′00″W
- Country: Brazil
- Region: Central-West
- State: Federal District
- Founded: November 3, 1956

Government
  - Regional administrator: Pablo Valente

Population (2010)
  - Total: 16.196
- Time zone: UTC−3 (BRT)
- Postal Code (CEP): 71725-000
- Area code: +55 61
- Website: www.candangolandia.df.gov.br

Candangolândia (Note: English: Land of the Candangos) (Portuguese pronunciation: [kɐn.dɐn.ɡoˈlɐ̃n.dʒiɐ]) is an administrative region in the Federal District in Brazil. It is bordered by Brasília to the north, Lago Sul to the east, Park Way and Núcleo Bandeirante to the south, and Guará to the west. Its population is 16,196 according to a 2010 report.

== Etymology ==
The name Candangolândia (lit. Land of the Candangos) derives itself from the regions first occupiers, the workers responsible for building Brasília, who were called "Candangos".

== History ==
=== Early history ===
Candangolândia originated during the construction of Brasília. As work on the new capital advanced, construction workers established a nearby settlement that became known as Cidade Livre ("Free City"). Candangolândia was founded on November 3, 1956, and it later received the status of an administrative region under Law No. 658 of January 27, 1994.

== Government ==
The government of Candangolândia, much like the other regions, is the Regional Administration. In a different fashion to municipalities, the Administrative Regions are administered by Regional Administrations, which are led by an administrator. Each administration is responsible for providing services to their respective regions, such as power, water, sanitation, and road infrastructure. The current administrator for Candangolândia is Pablo Valente.

== See also ==
- List of administrative regions of the Federal District
