= 2023 Campeonato Amazonense =

Campeonato Amazonense
- Season: 2023
- Champions: Amazonas
- Relegated: Iranduba; Fast Clube (withdrew)
- Série D: Manauara; Princesa do Solimões
- Copa do Brasil: Amazonas; Manauara
- Copa Verde: Amazonas; Manauara
- Matches played: 50
- Goals scored: 107 (2.14 per match)
- Biggest home win: Manauara 5–0 Iranduba (1 February 2023)
- Biggest away win: Iranduba 0–7 Amazonas (12 February 2023)
- Highest scoring: Iranduba 0–7 Amazonas (12 February 2023)

The 2023 Campeonato Amazonense was the 107th edition of Amazonas' top professional football league. The competition started on 28 January and ended on 22 April. Amazonas won the championship for the 1st time.

== Format ==
In the group stage, the teams face each other in a single round in a point system. The eight best teams advance to the quarter-finals, which are played in a knockout system, in round-robin matches, and continue this way to the Finals. The worst team in the first phase will be relegated.

The champion and the runner-up qualify to the 2024 Copa do Brasil and 2024 Copa Verde. The best two teams who isn't on Campeonato Brasileiro Série A, Série B or Série C qualifies to 2024 Campeonato Brasileiro Série D.

== Participating teams ==
Club	Home City	2022 Result
Amazonas Futebol Clube	Manaus	5th
Esporte Clube Iranduba da Amazônia	Iranduba	7th
Manauara Esporte Clube	Manaus	6th
Manaus Futebol Clube	Manaus	1st
Nacional Futebol Clube	Manaus	3rd
Operário Esporte Clube	Manacapuru	8th
Parintins Futebol Clube	Parintins	2nd (2nd division)
Princesa do Solimões Esporte Clube	Manacapuru	2nd
Atlético Rio Negro Clube	Manaus	1st (2nd division)

Note

- Fast Clube withdrew from the tournament and was relegated.

== Group stage ==
Pos	Team	Pld	W	D	L	GF	GA	GD	Pts	Qualification or relegation
1	Amazonas (A)	8	6	1	1	17	3	+14	19	Advance to the Final stage
2	Manauara (A)	8	5	2	1	21	6	+15	17	Advance to the Final stage
3	Princesa do Solimões (A)	8	4	2	2	10	7	+3	14	Advance to the Final stage
4	Manaus (A)	8	3	4	1	7	5	+2	13	Advance to the Final stage
5	Nacional (A)	8	2	5	1	9	8	+1	11	Advance to the Final stage
6	Parintins (A)	8	2	3	3	6	10	−4	9	Advance to the Final stage
7	Rio Negro (A)	8	1	4	3	7	10	−3	7	Advance to the Final stage
8	Operário (A)	8	0	2	6	1	14	−13	2	Advance to the Final stage
9	Iranduba (R)	8	0	3	5	0	19	−19	3 (Note: Iranduba was relegated and suspended from competitions for two years for involvement in a betting scheme.)	2024 Amazonense 2nd Division
10	Fast Clube (R)	0	-	-	-	-	-	—	0 (Note: Fast Clube withdrew from the tournament and was relegated.)	2024 Amazonense 2nd Division

Source: Globo Esporte
(A) Advance to a further round; (R) Relegated

== Final stage ==
=== Quarter-finals ===
11 March 2023
19:00 UTC –4

Operário	1–2	Amazonas

Gilbertão, Manacapuru
18 March 2023
15:30 UTC –4

Amazonas	2–0	Operário

Estádio Municipal Carlos Zamith, Manaus

Amazonas won 4–1 on aggregate and advanced to the semi-finals.

11 March 2023
15:30 UTC –4

Nacional	3–1	Manaus

Estádio Ismael Benigno, Manaus
18 March 2023
15:30 UTC –4

Manaus	1–0	Nacional

Arena da Amazônia, Manaus

Nacional won 3–2 on aggregate and advanced to the semi-finals.

14 March 2023
15:30 UTC –4

Parintins	1–1	Princesa do Solimões

Estádio Francisco Garcia, Rio Preto da Eva
18 March 2023
15:30 UTC –4

Princesa do Solimões	1–1	Parintins

Gilbertão, Manacapuru

Tied 2–2 on aggregate. Princesa do Solimões advanced for having made the best campaign.

15 March 2023
15:30 UTC –4

Rio Negro	0–1	Manauara

Arena da Amazônia, Manaus
19 March 2023
15:30 UTC –4

Manauara	1–0	Rio Negro

Estádio Municipal Carlos Zamith, Manaus

Manauara won 2–0 on aggregate and advanced to the semi-finals.

=== Semi-finals ===
25 March 2023
15:30 UTC –4

Nacional	0–1	Amazonas

Arena da Amazônia, Manaus
1 April 2023
15:30 UTC –4

Amazonas	0–0	Nacional

Estádio Municipal Carlos Zamith, Manaus

Amazonas won 1–0 on aggregate and advanced to the finals.

2 April 2023
15:30 UTC –4

Princesa do Solimões	1–3	Manauara

Gilbertão, Manacapuru
8 April 2023
15:30 UTC –4

Manauara	3–0	Princesa do Solimões

Estádio Municipal Carlos Zamith, Manaus

Manauara won 6–1 on aggregate and advanced to the finals.

== Finals ==
15 April 2023
15:30 UTC –4

Manauara	0–0	Amazonas
	Report

Estádio Municipal Carlos Zamith, Manaus
Attendance: 1,131
Referee: Ivan da Silva Guimarães Júnior
23 April 2023
10:00 UTC –4

Amazonas	1–0	Manauara
Luan 70'	Report

Estádio Municipal Carlos Zamith, Manaus
Attendance: 3,200
Referee: Edina Alves Batista

Amazonas won 1–0 on aggregate.
