= 2023 Campeonato Acreano =

Campeonato Acreano
- Season: 2023
- Champions: Rio Branco
- Série D: Rio Branco; Humaitá
- Copa do Brasil: Rio Branco; Humaitá
- Copa Verde: Rio Branco; Humaitá
- Matches: 37
- Goals: 137 (3.7 per match)
- Biggest home win: Humaitá 6–0 Andirá (5 March 2023)
- Biggest away win: Plácido de Castro 1–7 Humaitá (21 March 2023); Vasco de Rio Branco 0–6 Galvez (1 April 2023)
- Highest scoring: Galvez 7–2 Náuas (11 March 2023)

The 2023 Campeonato Acreano was the 96th edition of Acre's top professional football league. The competition started on 5 March and ended on 1 May. Rio Branco won the championship for the 48th time.

== Format ==
In the first stage, the teams were divided into two groups, "A" and "B", group "A" with six teams and group "B" with five teams, which played each other in their respective groups. Classifying the three best placed teams by earned points in each group won those teams places in the second stage.

The qualified teams from groups A and B played each other in the second stage. The club that finished the given phase first was crowned champion.

The champion and the runner-up qualified to the 2024 Campeonato Brasileiro Série D, 2024 Copa do Brasil and the 2024 Copa Verde.

== Participating teams ==
Club	Home City	2022 Result
Associação Desportiva Senador Guiomard (ADESG)	Senador Guiomard	3rd
Andirá Esporte Clube	Rio Branco	11th
Atlético Acreano	Rio Branco	9th
Galvez Esporte Clube	Rio Branco	4th
Sport Clube Humaitá	Porto Acre	1st
Independência Futebol Clube	Rio Branco	8th
Náuas Esporte Clube	Cruzeiro do Sul	6th
Plácido de Castro Futebol Club	Plácido de Castro	7th
Rio Branco Football Club	Rio Branco	5th
São Francisco Futebol Clube	Rio Branco	2nd
Associação Desportiva Vasco da Gama (Vasco de Rio Branco)	Rio Branco	10th

== First stage ==
=== Group A ===
Pos	Team	Pld	W	D	L	GF	GA	GD	Pts	Qualification or relegation
1	Humaitá (A)	5	4	0	1	17	3	+14	12	Advance to the Second stage
2	Independência (A)	5	4	0	1	11	3	+8	12	Advance to the Second stage
3	Rio Branco (A)	5	4	0	1	8	5	+3	12	Advance to the Second stage
4	Plácido de Castro	5	2	0	3	12	14	−2	6	
5	ADESG	5	1	0	4	4	14	−10	3	
6	Andirá	5	0	0	5	5	18	−13	0	

Source: Globo Esporte
(A) Advance to a further round

=== Group B ===
Pos	Team	Pld	W	D	L	GF	GA	GD	Pts	Qualification or relegation
1	São Francisco (A)	4	3	1	0	12	7	+5	10	Advance to the Second stage
2	Galvez (A)	4	2	2	0	16	5	+11	8	Advance to the Second stage
3	Atlético Acreano (A)	4	2	1	1	12	6	+6	7	Advance to the Second stage
4	Náuas	4	1	0	3	6	13	−7	3	
5	Vasco de Rio Branco	4	0	0	4	4	19	−15	0	

Source: Globo Esporte
(A) Advance to a further round

== Second stage ==
Pos	Team	Pld	W	D	L	GF	GA	GD	Pts
1	Rio Branco (C)	5	4	1	0	6	0	+6	13
2	Humaitá	5	3	1	1	9	5	+4	10
3	Galvez	5	2	2	1	7	2	+5	8
4	Independência	5	2	0	3	8	11	−3	6
5	Atlético Acreano	5	1	0	4	3	8	−5	3
6	São Francisco	5	1	0	4	6	13	−7	3

Source: Globo Esporte
(C) Champions
