= Arniqueira =

- Administrative region
- Região Administrativa de Arniqueira; Administrative Region of Arniqueira
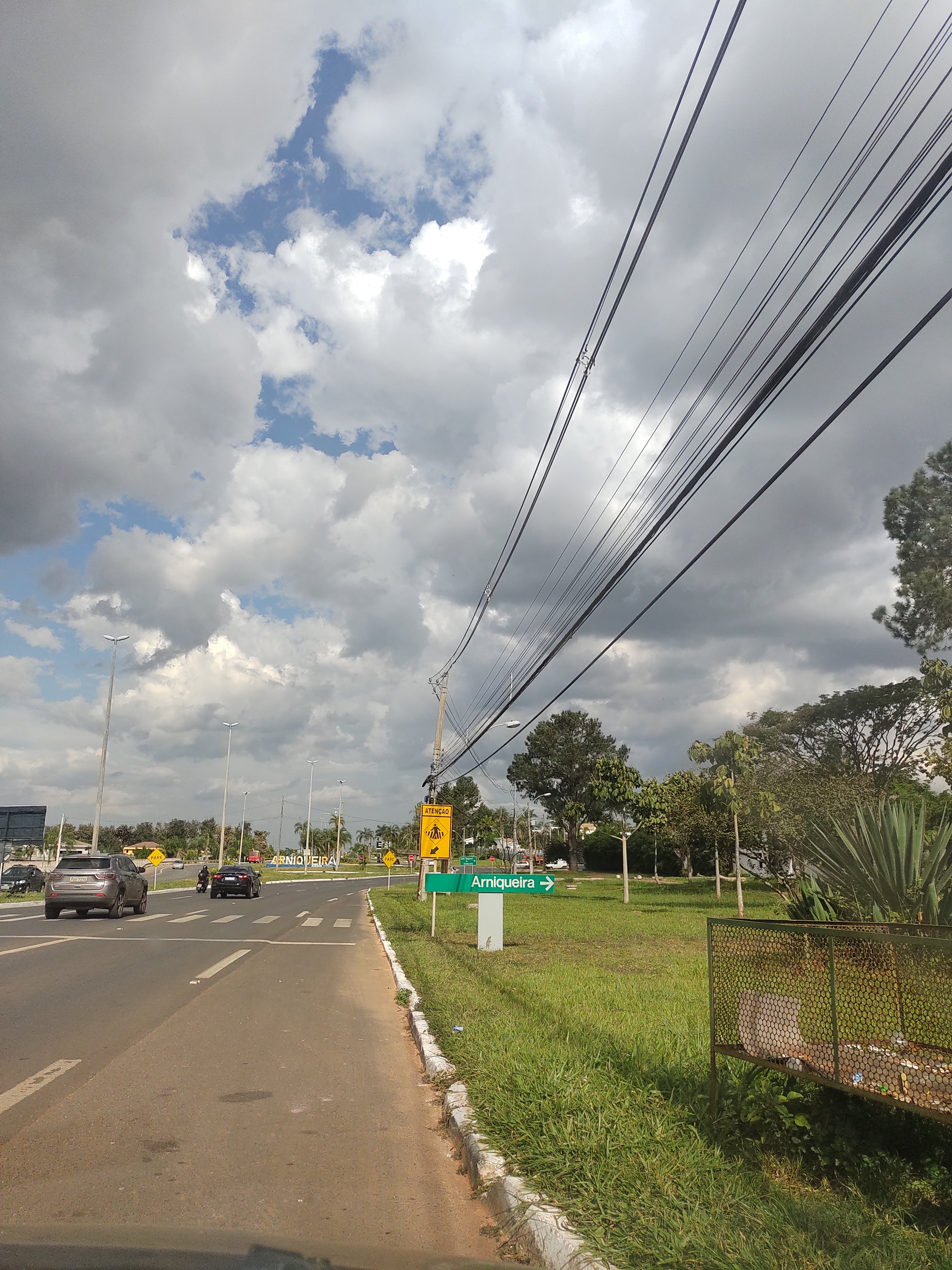

- Location of Arniquiera in the Federal District
- Country: Brazil
- Region: Central-West
- State: Federal District
- Founded: September 30, 1999

Government
  - Regional administrator: Telma Rufino

Population (2021)
  - Total: 47,105
- Time zone: UTC-3 (BRT)
  - Summer (DST): UTC-2 (BRST)
- Area code: +55 61
- Website: www.arniqueira.df.gov.br

Arniqueira is an administrative region in the Federal District in Brazil. Arniqueira grew substantially between 2000 and 2010, in which the population went from 18,716 to 43,718. In 2015 it was projected that the administrative region would have 46,621 inhabitants in 2020, and in 2021 the region reached 47,045.

== History ==
The settlement of the Arniqueira Region began in 1990, through the disorderly growth of a sector of farms, which gradually became an urban area that is currently undergoing a process of regularization. Often, both in popular language and in the media, and in official documents, the sector is called "Arniqueiras" (in the plural), the name of the agricultural colony that gave rise to the place, which mentions a stream that bathes the region; nevertheless, the district legislator chose to name the region officially "Arniqueira" (in the singular). Areal, another urban center in the administrative region, originated from the regularization of the former Vila Areal invasion, which took place in 1989. Despite being regularized, this housing nucleus has a deficit of urban infrastructure, such as the absence of colleges and high schools, and the existence of a single Health Center that does not meet the needs of the population, which makes Areal dependent on services from other regions, such as Águas Claras, Taguatinga and Riacho Fundo.

Arniqueira was founded on September 30, 1999, receiving the status of administrative region, according to Law 6391, of September 30, 2019. Thus, it was separated from the Águas Claras region and became the Arniqueira region, the 33rd Administrative Region of the Federal District. Part of the assets, number of servers, operational support, and number of commissioned positions were transferred from the Regional Administration of Águas Claras. These transfers were intended to move the necessary staff for the satisfactory administration of the new Administrative Region created by law.

=== Economic expansion ===
One of the areas that comprise the Arniqueira region is the Areal neighborhood, which stands out for a wide variety of shops and services provided to the population, in which they facilitate the daily lives of the residents of the region and stands out as the commercial center of the region. Administration of Arniqueira. Another region is the Economic Development Area (ADE) which concentrates large companies and industries in the Federal District. Among them are: Indústrias Rossi, Café do Sítio, Nasa Veículos, Wholesalers and food distributors, in addition to the diversity of services. Despite the economic expansion, Arniqueira faces several problems until the present day, such as the irregularity of the land and the absence of services such as the police station and health unit, in addition to the insufficient number of school places in public education.

=== Recent history ===
In 2020, a partnership was formed between the State Secretariat for Urban Development (Sedur) and the Federal District Development Agency (Terracap) which intended to regularize the Housing Sector of Arniqueira, through a notary registration of the lots and invest in infrastructure in the region. In 2020, in the Arniqueira Administrative Region, an Environmental Control Plan, a Plan for the Recovery of Degraded Areas and Studies of streams and tributaries, due to the formation of erosion and damage to the streams that surround the region, resulting from the irregular occupation of the area, were also prepared, as well as lack of urban planning and the incorrect subdivision of land in Arniqueira.

== Geography ==
Arniqueira is located close to 6 other administrative regions, Águas Claras, Guará, Núcleo Bandeirante, Riacho Fundo and Taguatinga. The region has access to federal highways BR-060, located to the south of the region, DF-001 to the west, and DF-079 to the east, which are direct accesses. It covers an area of 1,300 hectares, which encompasses the Setor Habitacional Arniqueira, Areal Qs 06 to 11, (Qs 07 except for the Catholic University area) and Economic Development Area (ADE). In the Federal District, flat (0% to 3%) and smooth-undulating (3% to 8%) slopes predominate, which extend into the Arniqueira region. As a result of this flat characteristic of the DF, the level curves are not accentuated, only with greater variation in the locations of the watercourses.

=== Relief and hydrography ===
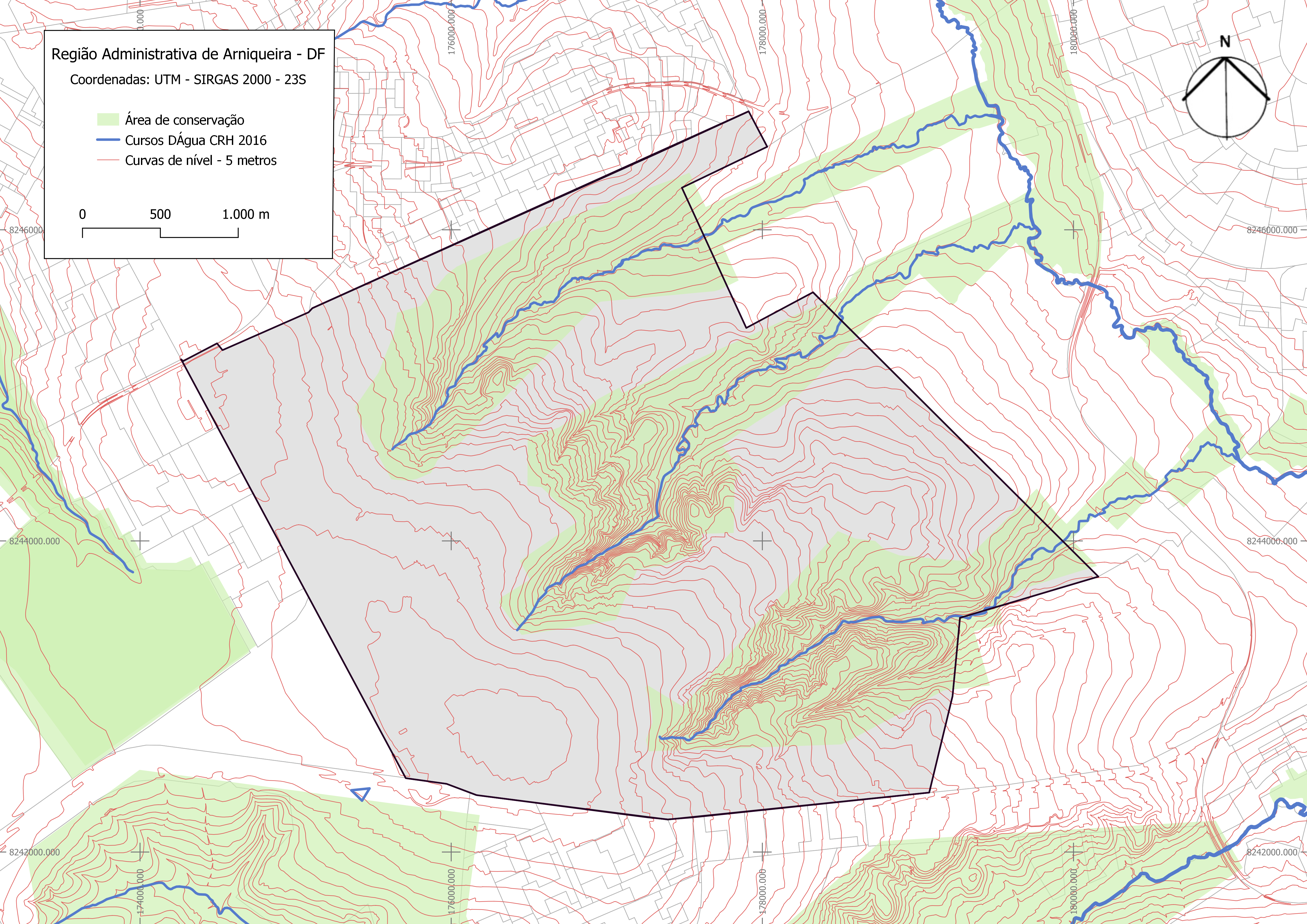
Map of Arniqueira Region by relief and hydrography

Some watercourses from Lake Paranoá are arranged in Arniqueira, since they are present in Hydrographic Unit 13 Riacho Fundo, bathed by the Paranoá River. In the region, there are watercourses that spread over a large part of the territory. These watercourses come from Hydrographic Unit 13 Riacho Fundo, which is located in the Lake Paranoá Basin. The basin covers a large part of the central region of the Federal District, and is the only basin that is fully inserted in the DF. In the Federal District, flat (0% to 3%) and smooth-undulating (3% to 8%) slopes predominate, which extend into the Arniqueira region. As a result of this flat characteristic of the DF, the level curves are not accentuated, only with greater variation in the locations of the watercourses.

=== Climate ===
Arniqueira has a humid subtropical climate with dry winter (Cwa) and hot summer, in relation to the Köppen climate classification. The Cwa determines that the coldest month of the year has an average temperature above 0 °C or −3 °C, that at least one month a year has an average temperature above 22 °C, and that at least four months a year have average above 10 °C. Relative air humidity reaches its highest average indices between November and February, while the lowest indices occur between August and September. The average annual air humidity is 59.5%.

The highest rainfall rates stand out in the months from November to January, reaching a total of 727 mm (47% of the total volume of the year). Since in the driest months, which would be from June to August, it only reaches 34 mm of rainfall (2% of the total volume of the year).

== See also ==
- List of administrative regions of the Federal District
