= Núcleo Bandeirante =

- Administrative region
- Região Administrativa de Núcleo Bandeirante; Administrative Region of Núcleo Bandeirante
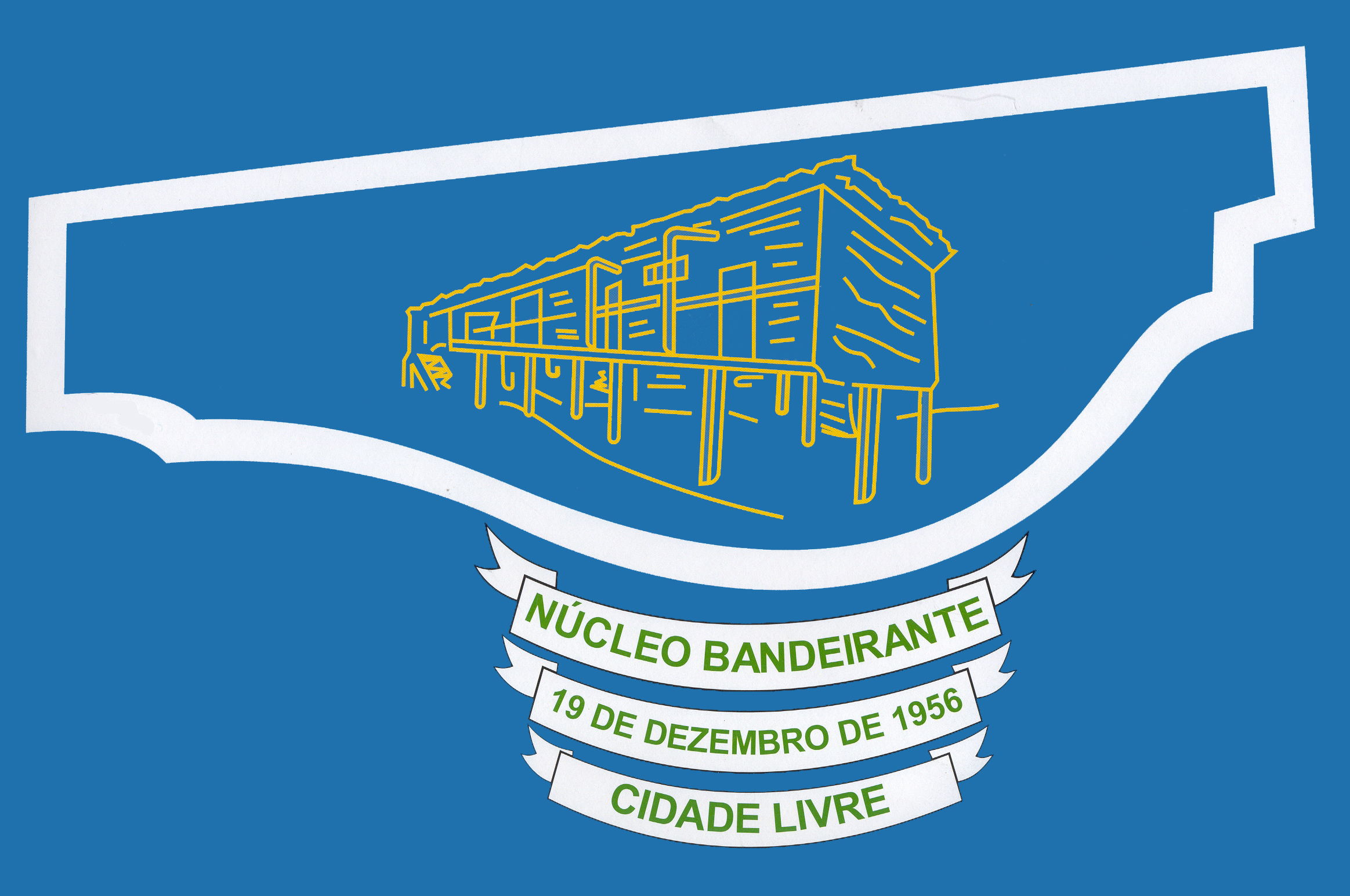
- Flag

- Localization of Núcleo Bandeirante in Federal District
- Coordinates: 15°52′12″S 47°58′04″W
- Country: Brazil
- Region: Central-West
- State: Federal District
- Founded: December 19, 1956

Government
  - Regional administrator: Cláudio Márcio de Oliveira

Area
  - Total: 80.43 km^{2} (31.05 sq mi)

Population (2010)
  - Total: 26,089
- Time zone: UTC−3 (BRT)
- Postal Code (CEP): 71700-000
- Area code: +55 61
- Website: www.bandeirante.df.gov.br

Núcleo Bandeirante is an administrative region in the Federal District in Brazil. It is located to the west of Paranoá Lake, being bordered by Arniqueira, Park Way, and Guará to the north, Candangolândia to the east, and Park Way and Riacho Fundo to the south. Núcleo Bandeirante was founded on December 19, 1956, receiving the status of administrative region, according to Law 4545, of December 10, 1964.

== Geography ==
Núcleo Bandeirante is located in the Brazilian Highlands, at an altitude of 1,000 metres (3,300 ft).

=== Climate ===
Climate data for Núcleo Bandeirante (1991–2020, extremes 1961–present)
Month	Jan	Feb	Mar	Apr	May	Jun	Jul	Aug	Sep	Oct	Nov	Dec	Year
Record high °C (°F)	32.6 (90.7)	32.0 (89.6)	32.1 (89.8)	31.6 (88.9)	31.6 (88.9)	31.6 (88.9)	30.8 (87.4)	33.0 (91.4)	35.7 (96.3)	36.4 (97.5)	34.5 (94.1)	33.7 (92.7)	36.4 (97.5)
Mean daily maximum °C (°F)	26.9 (80.4)	27.2 (81.0)	27.0 (80.6)	26.8 (80.2)	26.0 (78.8)	25.3 (77.5)	25.6 (78.1)	27.4 (81.3)	29.1 (84.4)	29.0 (84.2)	27.0 (80.6)	26.8 (80.2)	27.0 (80.6)
Daily mean °C (°F)	21.9 (71.4)	21.9 (71.4)	21.8 (71.2)	21.6 (70.9)	20.3 (68.5)	19.3 (66.7)	19.3 (66.7)	21.0 (69.8)	22.8 (73.0)	23.1 (73.6)	21.7 (71.1)	21.7 (71.1)	21.4 (70.5)
Mean daily minimum °C (°F)	18.3 (64.9)	18.2 (64.8)	18.2 (64.8)	17.7 (63.9)	15.6 (60.1)	14.2 (57.6)	13.9 (57.0)	15.3 (59.5)	17.6 (63.7)	18.5 (65.3)	18.1 (64.6)	18.3 (64.9)	17.0 (62.6)
Record low °C (°F)	12.2 (54.0)	11.0 (51.8)	14.5 (58.1)	10.7 (51.3)	3.2 (37.8)	3.3 (37.9)	1.6 (34.9)	5.0 (41.0)	9.0 (48.2)	10.2 (50.4)	11.4 (52.5)	11.4 (52.5)	1.6 (34.9)
Average precipitation mm (inches)	206.0 (8.11)	179.5 (7.07)	226.0 (8.90)	145.2 (5.72)	26.9 (1.06)	3.3 (0.13)	1.5 (0.06)	16.3 (0.64)	38.1 (1.50)	141.8 (5.58)	253.1 (9.96)	241.1 (9.49)	1,478.8 (58.22)
Average precipitation days (≥ 1.0 mm)	16	14	15	9	3	1	0	2	4	10	17	18	109
Average relative humidity (%)	74.7	74.2	76.1	72.2	65.4	58.8	51.0	43.5	46.4	58.8	74.5	76.0	64.3
Mean monthly sunshine hours	159.6	158.9	168.7	200.8	237.9	247.6	268.3	273.5	225.7	191.3	138.3	145.0	2,415.6
Source 1: INMET
Source 2: Meteo Climat (record highs and lows)

== Government ==
As with other administrative regions, the government of Núcleo Bandeirante is the Regional Administration. In a different fashion to municipalities, the Administrative Regions are administered by Regional Administrations, which are led by an administrator. Each administration is responsible for providing services to their respective regions, such as power, water, sanitation, and road infrastructure. The current administrator for Núcleo Bandeirante is Cláudio Márcio de Oliveira.

== See also ==
- List of administrative regions of the Federal District
