= 2023 Campeonato Brasiliense =

Campeonato Brasiliense
- Season: 2023
- Champions: Real Brasília
- Relegated: Taguatinga; Brasília
- Série D: Real Brasília; Brasiliense
- Copa do Brasil: Real Brasília; Brasiliense
- Copa Verde: Real Brasília; Brasiliense
- Matches played: 50
- Goals scored: 130 (2.6 per match)
- Biggest home win: Brasiliense 5–0 Taguatinga (13 February 2023)
- Biggest away win: Ceilândia 0–3 Brasiliense (29 January 2023)

The 2023 Campeonato Brasiliense was the 65th edition of the Federal District, Brazil, top professional football league. The competition started on 28 January and ended on 15 April. Real Brasília won the championship for the 1st time.

== Format ==
The group phase will be in an all-against-all format, in a single round, with the four best teams advancing to the final phase, in round-robin matches with the advantage of equal results for the best-placed teams.

The two worst teams will be relegated to the 2024 Campeonato Brasiliense Second Division.

The champion and the runner-up qualify to the 2024 Campeonato Brasileiro Série D, 2024 Copa do Brasil and the 2024 Copa Verde.

== Participating teams ==
Team	City	2022 result
Brasília	Brasília	7th
Brasiliense	Taguatinga	1st
Capital	Paranoá	3rd
Ceilândia	Ceilândia	2nd
Gama	Gama	4th
Paranoá	Paranoá	6th
Real Brasília	Guará	2nd (2nd level)
Samambaia	Samambaia	1st (2nd level)
Santa Maria	Santa Maria	5th
Taguatinga	Taguatinga	8th

== Group stage ==
Pos	Team	Pld	W	D	L	GF	GA	GD	Pts	Qualification or relegation
1	Real Brasília (A)	9	5	3	1	13	6	+7	18	Advance to the Final stage
2	Brasiliense (A)	9	4	3	2	18	9	+9	15	Advance to the Final stage
3	Capital (A)	9	4	3	2	11	8	+3	15	Advance to the Final stage
4	Paranoá (A)	9	4	3	2	14	15	−1	15	Advance to the Final stage
5	Gama	9	4	2	3	8	6	+2	14	
6	Ceilândia	9	4	2	3	12	11	+1	14	
7	Samambaia	9	4	1	4	16	16	0	13	
8	Santa Maria	9	2	1	6	9	14	−5	7	
9	Taguatinga (R)	9	2	1	6	12	19	−7	7	2024 Brasiliense 2nd Division
10	Brasília (R)	9	2	1	6	9	18	−9	7	2024 Brasiliense 2nd Division

Source: Globo Esporte
(A) Advance to a further round; (R) Relegated

== Final stage ==
=== Semi-finals ===
25 March 2023
15:30 UTC –3

Paranoá	1–1	Real Brasília

Estádio JK Paranoá, Paranoá
1 April 2023
15:00 UTC –3

Real Brasília	1–1	Paranoá

Defelê, Brasília

Tied 2–2 on aggregate. Real Brasília advanced for having made the best campaign.

26 March 2023
15:45 UTC –3

Capital	0–2	Brasiliense

Estádio JK Paranoá, Paranoá
2 April 2023
16:00 UTC –3

Brasiliense	1–0	Capital

Serejão, Taguatinga

Brasiliense won 3–0 on aggregate and advanced to the finals.

== Finals ==
8 April 2023
16:00 UTC –3

Brasiliense	3–2	Real Brasília
Tobinha 16', 44'; Igor Wilhelms 54'	Report	Juan Azevedo 53', 80'

Serejão, Taguatinga
Attendance: 994
Referee: Rafael Martins Diniz
15 April 2023
15:00 UTC –3

Real Brasília	1–0	Brasiliense
Mateus Jesus 79'	Report
Penalties
	2–1

Defelê, Brasília
Attendance: 987
Referee: Rafael Martins Diniz
