= Manauara Esporte Clube =

Brazilian football club

Manauara
- Full name: Manauara Esporte Clube
- Nickname: Orange Robot
- Founded: 30 November 2020; 5 years ago
- Ground: Estádio Municipal Carlos Zamith; Arena da Amazônia
- President: Marcus Souza
- Head coach: Christian de Souza
- League: Campeonato Brasileiro Série D Campeonato Amazonense
- 2025 2025: Série D, 13th of 64; Amazonense, 4th of 10
Home colours	Away colours

Manauara Esporte Clube, commonly known as Manauara, is a Brazilian football club based in Manaus, Amazonas.

== History ==
The club was founded in 2020 and won the second level of Amazonas in 2021. In the 2023 season, qualified for the first time for the Campeonato Brasileiro Série D.

== Appearances ==
Following is the summary of Manauara appearances in Campeonato Amazonense:

Season	Division	Final position
2021	2nd	1st
2022	1st	6th
2023	1st	2nd
2024	1st	3rd
2025	1st	4th

== Honours ==
- Campeonato Amazonense
  - Runners-up: 2023
- Campeonato Amazonense Second Division
  - Winners (1): 2021
