= Real Brasília FC =

Brazilian football club

Real Brasília
- Full name: Real Brasília Futebol Clube
- Founded: 22 February 1996; 30 years ago
- Ground: Defelê, Brasília, Federal District, Brazil
- Capacity: 6,875
- President: Luís Felipe
- Head coach: Evilasio Almeida
- League: Campeonato Brasiliense
- 2025: Brasiliense, 8th of 10
- Website: https://realbrasilia.com.br/
Home colors	Away colors

Real Brasília Futebol Clube, commonly known as Real Brasília or simply Real, is a Brazilian football team based in Brasília. They competed in Série C and in the Copa do Brasil twice. They went through two relocations and several name changes in their history. The club was formerly known as Esporte Clube Dom Pedro II.

Real Brasília is currently the fifth-best ranked team from the Federal District in CBF's national club ranking, at 201st overall.

== History ==
The club was founded on 22 February 1996 in Guará as Esporte Clube Dom Pedro II, and it was named after Pedro II of Brazil, who was the second Emperor of the country. The club moved to Núcleo Bandeirante, Distrito Federal in 2009, and it was renamed to Esporte Clube Dom Pedro Bandeirante.

Dom Pedro competed in the Série C in 1999, when they failed to reach the Final Stage of the competition. The club competed in the Copa do Brasil in 2000, when they were eliminated in the Second Stage by Ponte Preta. Dom Pedro competed in the 2000 edition of the Série A, named Copa João Havelange. The club participated in the Green Group, reaching the Second Stage of the competition. They won the Campeonato Brasiliense Second Level in 2002. The club competed in the Série C again in 2008, when they reached the Second Stage Stage of the competition. Dom Pedro competed in the Copa do Brasil for a second time in 2009, when they were eliminated in the First Stage by Botafogo.

On 1 November 2016, after achieving promotion back to the first division of the Campeonato Brasiliense, the club changed its name to Real Futebol Clube and moved to Brasília. Ahead of the 2020 campaign, the club again changed name to Real Brasília Futebol Clube.

== Honours ==
=== State ===
- Campeonato Brasiliense
  - Winners (1): 2023
  - Runners-up (2): 1999, 2008
- Campeonato Brasiliense Second Division
  - Winners (2): 2002, 2016

== Stadium ==
Real Brasília plays their home matches in the Defelê, with a capacity of 1,500 people.

When established in Núcleo Bandeirante, Esporte Clube Dom Pedro Bandeirante played their home games at Estádio Vasco Viana de Andrade, nicknamed Metropolitana. The stadium has a maximum capacity of 3,000 people. When based in Guará, the club played at Estádio Adonir Guimarães. The stadium has a maximum capacity of 5,000 people.

== See also ==
- Real Brasília FC (women)
