= 2016 Clube do Remo season =

2016 season of Brazilian association football team

Remo
2016 season
- President: André Cavalcante
- Coach: Leston Júnior (until 28 March 2016); Marcelo Veiga (until 25 June 2016); Waldemar Lemos
- Stadium: Mangueirão
- Campeonato Brasileiro Série C: 11th
- Campeonato Paraense: 4th
- Copa Verde: Semi-finals
- Copa do Brasil: First round
- Highest home attendance: 31,906 (vs. América de Natal, 18 September 2016)
- Lowest home attendance: 1,585 (vs. São Raimundo-PA, 10 April 2016)
Home colors	Away colors

The 2016 season was Remo's 103rd existence. The club participated in the Campeonato Brasileiro Série C, the Campeonato Paraense, the Copa Verde and the Copa do Brasil.

Remo finished outside of the top four of the Campeonato Brasileiro Série C (5th place in the group stage and 11th overall). The club finished in the 4th place of the Campeonato Paraense. In the Copa Verde, Remo was eliminated in the semi-finals by Paysandu 6-3 in the aggregate. In the Copa do Brasil, the club was eliminated in the first round by Vasco da Gama 3-1 in the aggregate.

== Players ==
=== Squad information ===
Numbers in parentheses denote appearances as substitute.

As of 19 September 2016

Position	Nat.	Name	Date of Birth (Age)		
Position	Nat.	Name	Date of Birth (Age)	Apps	Goals
GK	BRA	Fernando Henrique	25 November 1983 (aged 32)	34	0
GK	BRA	Douglas Borges	30 March 1990 (aged 26)	3	0
GK	BRA	Vitor Prada	4 August 1992 (aged 24)	0	0
GK	BRA	André	14 January 1995 (aged 21)	0	0
DF	BRA	Max	7 February 1987 (aged 29)	22	1
DF	BRA	Henrique	8 February 1991 (aged 25)	25 (1)	0
DF	BRA	Ítalo	22 February 1989 (aged 27)	20 (1)	0
DF	BRA	Ciro Sena	8 June 1982 (aged 34)	2 (1)	0
DF	BRA	Renato Justi	23 March 1988 (aged 28)	1	1
DF	BRA	Levy	22 July 1988 (aged 28)	31 (2)	3
DF	BRA	Murilo	5 January 1984 (aged 32)	11 (1)	0
DF	BRA	Osvaldir	15 May 1987 (aged 29)	1 (1)	0
DF	BRA	Wellington Saci	5 January 1985 (aged 31)	12	1
DF	BRA	Jussandro	11 March 1992 (aged 24)	2 (3)	0
MF	BRA	Tsunami	4 January 1996 (aged 20)	0 (1)	0
MF	BRA	Alisson	19 December 1986 (aged 29)	9 (3)	0
MF	BRA	Lucas Garcia	16 July 1991 (aged 25)	6 (4)	0
MF	BRA	Chicão	11 July 1981 (aged 35)	13 (3)	0
MF	BRA	Michel Schmöller	11 November 1987 (aged 28)	16	0
MF	BRA	Yuri	7 October 1989 (aged 26)	27 (5)	3
MF	BRA	Allan Dias	19 October 1988 (aged 27)	7 (4)	2
MF	BRA	Edicleber	30 October 1993 (aged 22)	2 (5)	0
MF	BRA	Hériclis	20 October 1995 (aged 20)	2 (6)	0
MF	BRA	Flamel	6 October 1983 (aged 32)	0 (3)	0
MF	BRA	Marcinho	8 June 1995 (aged 21)	10 (5)	0
MF	BRA	Eduardo Ramos	25 March 1986 (aged 30)	34	8
FW	BRA	Júnior Miranda	10 May 1995 (aged 21)	0 (1)	0
FW	BRA	Sílvio	11 February 1994 (aged 22)	1 (9)	1
FW	BRA	Magno	30 October 1993 (aged 22)	0 (1)	0
FW	BRA	Fernandinho	15 September 1994 (aged 22)	10 (1)	1
FW	BRA	João Victor	7 December 1994 (aged 21)	1 (9)	1
FW	BRA	Luiz Carlos	31 August 1980 (aged 36)	6	1
FW	BRA	Ciro	18 April 1989 (aged 27)	22 (6)	8
FW	BRA	Edno	31 May 1983 (aged 33)	16	7
Players left the club during the playing season
DF	BRA	Igor João	23 April 1993 (aged 23)	2 (2)	0
DF	BRA	Brinner	16 July 1987 (aged 29)	6	1
DF	BRA	João Victor	13 February 1984 (aged 32)	8 (1)	0
DF	BRA	Fabiano	17 February 1990 (aged 26)	6	0
MF	BRA	Arthur	2 October 1993 (aged 22)	2 (2)	0
MF	BRA	Michel	8 June 1981 (aged 35)	11 (1)	0
MF	BRA	Marco Goiano	15 March 1986 (aged 30)	14 (2)	4
FW	BRA	Jaquiel	15 March 1994 (aged 22)	0 (1)	0
FW	BRA	Potita	31 July 1984 (aged 32)	1 (4)	0
FW	BRA	Welthon	21 June 1992 (aged 24)	5 (9)	3
FW	BRA	Léo Paraíba	8 August 1988 (aged 28)	4 (7)	2
FW	BRA	Patrick	23 August 1990 (aged 26)	2 (1)	0

=== Top scorers ===
As of 10 September 2016

Place	Position	Name	Campeonato Brasileiro Série C	Campeonato Paraense	Copa Verde	Copa do Brasil	Total
1	FW	Ciro	0	6	2	0	8
1	MF	Eduardo Ramos	2	4	2	0	8
3	FW	Edno	7	0	0	0	7
4	MF	Marco Goiano	0	3	1	0	4
5	FW	Welthon	0	0	3	0	3
5	MF	Yuri	2	0	1	0	3
5	DF	Levy	2	1	0	0	3
8	FW	Léo Paraíba	0	2	0	0	2
8	MF	Allan Dias	2	0	0	0	2
10	FW	João Victor	1	0	0	0	1
10	FW	Fernandinho	1	0	0	0	1
10	FW	Luiz Carlos	0	0	1	0	1
10	FW	Sílvio	0	1	0	0	1
10	DF	Wellington Saci	1	0	0	0	1
10	DF	Renato Justi	1	0	0	0	1
10	DF	Brinner	1	0	0	0	1
10	DF	Max	0	0	0	1	1
Own goals			1	0	1	0	2

=== Disciplinary record ===
As of 19 September 2016

Position	Name	Campeonato Brasileiro Série C		Campeonato Paraense		Copa Verde		Copa do Brasil		Total	
Position	Name	Yellow card	Red card	Yellow card	Red card	Yellow card	Red card	Yellow card	Red card	Yellow card	Red card
MF	Yuri	8	1	2	0	0	0	0	0	10	1
DF	Max	4	0	2	0	1	1	1	0	8	1
MF	Hériclis	3	1	0	0	0	0	0	0	3	1
MF	Eduardo Ramos	2	0	3	0	2	0	1	0	8	0
GK	Fernando Henrique	4	0	2	0	0	0	0	0	6	0
FW	Ciro	2	0	1	0	2	0	0	0	5	0
DF	Levy	2	0	3	0	0	0	0	0	5	0
MF	Michel Schmöller	5	0	0	0	0	0	0	0	5	0
DF	Henrique	3	0	1	0	0	0	0	0	4	0
MF	Allan Dias	3	0	0	0	0	0	0	0	3	0
MF	Chicão	0	0	0	0	3	0	0	0	3	0
DF	Murilo	1	0	2	0	0	0	0	0	3	0
FW	Fernandinho	3	0	0	0	0	0	0	0	3	0
MF	Michel	0	0	2	0	0	0	0	0	2	0
DF	Ítalo	0	0	1	0	1	0	0	0	2	0
MF	Alisson	1	0	0	0	1	0	0	0	2	0
MF	Lucas Garcia	1	0	0	0	0	0	1	0	2	0
DF	Wellington Saci	2	0	0	0	0	0	0	0	2	0
DF	Fabiano	2	0	0	0	0	0	0	0	2	0
FW	Edno	1	0	0	0	0	0	0	0	1	0
MF	Marcinho	1	0	0	0	0	0	0	0	1	0
FW	Patrick	1	0	0	0	0	0	0	0	1	0
DF	Jussandro	1	0	0	0	0	0	0	0	1	0
DF	Brinner	1	0	0	0	0	0	0	0	1	0
DF	Ciro Sena	1	0	0	0	0	0	0	0	1	0
MF	Arthur	0	0	1	0	0	0	0	0	1	0
FW	Potita	0	0	0	0	1	0	0	0	1	0
FW	Luiz Carlos	0	0	0	0	1	0	0	0	1	0
DF	João Victor	0	0	1	0	0	0	0	0	1	0
FW	Léo Paraíba	0	0	1	0	0	0	0	0	1	0
FW	Sílvio	0	0	1	0	0	0	0	0	1	0
DF	Igor João	0	0	1	0	0	0	0	0	1	0
	TOTALS	52	2	24	0	12	1	3	0	91	3

== Kit ==
Supplier: Umbro / Main sponsor: Banpará

Home	Home alt. 1	Home alt. 2	Away	Away alt. 1	Away alt. 2	Away alt. 3

== Transfers ==
=== Transfers in ===
Position	Name	From	Source
MF	Marco Goiano	(Brazil) Tupi	
MF	Alisson	(Brazil) Macaé	
MF	Yuri	(Brazil) Caldense (loan)	
GK	Douglas Borges	(Brazil) Volta Redonda (loan)	
DF	João Victor	(Brazil) CRB	
MF	Arthur	(Brazil) Vila Nova	
MF	Michel	Free agent	
FW	Ciro	(South Korea) Jeju United (loan)	
DF	Ítalo	(Brazil) Londrina	
DF	Murilo	(Brazil) Atlético Goianiense	
FW	Potita	(Brazil) Brusque	
MF	Marcinho	(Brazil) Corinthians	
FW	Luiz Carlos	(Brazil) Guarany de Sobral	
MF	Lucas Garcia	(Brazil) Luziânia	
DF	Fabiano	(Brazil) Itumbiara	
FW	Magno	(Brazil) Parauapebas	
DF	Brinner	(Brazil) Oeste	
FW	Fernandinho	(Brazil) São Bento	
MF	Michel Schmöller	(Brazil) Internacional de Lages	
MF	Allan Dias	(Brazil) Botafogo-SP	
FW	Patrick	(Brazil) XV de Piracicaba	
MF	Hériclis	(Brazil) Gama	
DF	Jussandro	(Brazil) Botafogo-SP	
FW	Edno	(Brazil) São Bento	
GK	Vitor Prada	(Brazil) Avaí (loan)	
DF	Ednei	(Brazil) Vitória (loan)	
DF	Wellington Saci	(Brazil) Criciúma	
DF	Ciro Sena	Free agent	
DF	Osvaldir	(Brazil) Nacional	
MF	Flamel	(Brazil) Águia de Marabá	
DF	Renato Justi	(Brazil) Anápolis (loan)	

=== Transfers out ===
Position	Name	To	Source
MF	Tsunami	(Brazil) Tapajós (loan)	
FW	Léo Paraíba	(Brazil) Nacional	
MF	Michel	Free agent	
MF	Arthur	(Brazil) Grêmio Anápolis	
FW	Welthon	(Portugal) Paços de Ferreira	
FW	Potita	Free agent	
MF	Marco Goiano	(Brazil) Moto Club	
DF	Igor João	(Brazil) São Raimundo-PA (loan)	
DF	Brinner	(Turkey) Bandırmaspor	
DF	João Victor	Free agent	
FW	Patrick	(Brazil) Vila Nova	
DF	Ednei	(Brazil) Bragantino	
DF	Fabiano	(Brazil) Bragantino	

Notes

1. Following Arthur's release on 4 May, he later signed for Grêmio Anápolis on 8 July.
1. Following Welthon's release on 8 May, he later signed for Paços de Ferreira on 23 June.
2. Following Marco Goiano's release on 8 May, he later signed for Moto Club on 16 June.

== Competitions ==
Competition	First match	Last match	Starting round	Final position	Record							
Competition	First match	Last match	Starting round	Final position	Pld	W	D	L	GF	GA	GD	Win %
Campeonato Brasileiro Série C	21 May 2016	18 September 2016	Group stage	11th	18	6	7	5	21	20	+1	33.33
Campeonato Paraense	31 January 2016	10 April 2016	First round	4th	11	3	6	2	16	13	+3	27.27
Copa Verde	10 March 2016	23 April 2016	Round of 16	Semi-finals	6	3	1	2	12	8	+4	50.00
Copa do Brasil	13 April 2016	27 April 2016	First round	First round	2	0	0	2	1	3	−2	0.00
Total					37	12	14	11	50	44	+6	32.43

Source: Competitions

=== Campeonato Brasileiro Série C ===
==== Group stage ====
Pos	Team	Pld	W	D	L	GF	GA	GD	Pts	Qualification or relegation
3	Botafogo-PB (Q)	18	7	7	4	19	13	+6	28	Qualification for Final Stage
4	ASA (Q)	18	6	8	4	16	15	+1	26	Qualification for Final Stage
5	Remo	18	6	7	5	21	20	+1	25	
6	Cuiabá	18	5	7	6	19	17	+2	22	
7	Confiança	18	5	7	6	22	26	−4	22	

Updated to match(es) played on 18 September 2016. Source: Soccerway.com
Rules for classification: 1) points; 2) wins; 3) goal difference; 4) goals scored; 5) head-to-head results; 6) least red cards received; 7) least yellow cards received; 8) draw.
(Q) Qualified for the phase indicated

===== Matches =====
21 May 2016 1	Cuiabá	1–1	Remo	Cuiabá
19:00 UTC−3	Léo Salino (yellow card) 26'; Gilson Alves 43'; Samuel (yellow card) 49'	Report	Fabiano (yellow card) 8'; Fernandinho 13'; Henrique (yellow card) 17'; Fernando Henrique (yellow card) 42'; Lucas Garcia (yellow card) 49'; Brinner (yellow card) 52'; Yuri (yellow card) 67'	Stadium: Arena Pantanal; Attendance: 727; Referee: Wanderson Alves de Sousa

30 May 2016 2	Remo	0–1	ASA	Belém
20:00 UTC−3	Max (yellow card) 36'; Allan Dias (yellow card) 45+1'	Report	Jefferson Baiano 17'; Jorginho (yellow card) 59'	Stadium: Mangueirão; Attendance: 12,899; Referee: Antônio Rogério Batista do Prado

5 June 2016 3	River	1–2	Remo	Teresina
19:00 UTC−3	Tote 19'	Report	Brinner 9'; Yuri (yellow card) 37'; Edno 45+1'; Michel Schmöller (yellow card) 61'	Stadium: Albertão; Attendance: 4,704; Referee: Gleidson Santos Oliveira

11 June 2016 4	Remo	0–0	Botafogo-PB	Belém
18:00 UTC−3	Max (yellow card) 25'; Michel Schmöller (yellow card) 37'; Allan Dias (yellow card) 75'	Report	Jefferson Recife (yellow card) 25'; Nildo (yellow card) 40'; Marcelo Xavier (yellow card) 55'	Stadium: Mangueirão; Attendance: 11,617; Referee: Alisson Sidnei Furtado

19 June 2016 5	Confiança	3–5	Remo	Aracaju
19:00 UTC−3	Everton Sena (yellow card) 8'; Alex Moraes (yellow card) 26'; Assis 35', 81'; Mateus Paraná (yellow card) 45+1'; Yuri 84' (o.g.); Mauro (yellow card) 86'	Report	Levy 10', 90+3' (yellow card) 90+4'; Allan Dias 14', 47'; Patrick (yellow card) 21'; Edno 88' (pen.); Hériclis (red card) 90+2'; Ciro (yellow card) 90+4'	Stadium: Batistão; Attendance: 2,244; Referee: João Batista de Arruda

25 June 2016 6	Remo	1–1	ABC	Belém
18:00 UTC−3	Michel Schmöller (yellow card) 18'; Eduardo Ramos 23'	Report	Jones Carioca 5'; Anderson Pedra (yellow card) 44'	Stadium: Mangueirão; Attendance: 10,953; Referee: Bráulio da Silva Machado

4 July 2016 7	Salgueiro	1–0	Remo	Salgueiro
19:15 UTC−3	Cássio 9'; Tatu (yellow card) 62'	Report	Fabiano (yellow card) 20'	Stadium: Estádio Cornélio de Barros; Attendance: 2,806; Referee: Leandro Newley Ferreira Belota

10 July 2016 8	Remo	2–0	Fortaleza	Belém
18:30 UTC−3	Michel Schmöller (yellow card) 6'; Eduardo Ramos 29'; Yuri (yellow card) 53'; Edno 83'	Report	Pio (yellow card) 87'	Stadium: Mangueirão; Attendance: 7,992; Referee: Emerson de Almeida Ferreira

16 July 2016 9	América de Natal	1–1	Remo	Natal
16:00 UTC−3	Luiz Eduardo 6'	Report	Hériclis (yellow card) 25'; Henrique (yellow card) 27'; Edno 32'; Ciro (yellow card) 44'	Stadium: Arena das Dunas; Attendance: 5,883; Referee: Rodrigo Nunes de Sá

25 July 2016 10	Remo	2–0	Cuiabá	Belém
19:15 UTC−3	Yuri 40'; Michel Schmöller (yellow card) 43'; Diogo Borges 50' (o.g.); Edno (yellow card) 61'; Levy (yellow card) 90'	Report	Carlão (yellow card) 25'; Douglas Mendes (yellow card) 66'; Julinho (yellow card) 87'	Stadium: Mangueirão; Attendance: 11,650; Referee: Eduardo Tomaz de Aquino Valadão

30 July 2016 11	ASA	2–2	Remo	Arapiraca
20:30 UTC−3	Reinaldo Alagoano 62', 66'; Klenisson (yellow card) 69'; João Paulo (yellow card) 77'; Max Carrasco (yellow card) 90'	Report	Yuri (yellow card) 9' (yellow-red card) 41' (goal) 34'; Wellington Saci 15', (yellow card) 69'; Fernando Henrique (yellow card) 67'	Stadium: Estádio Municipal Coaracy da Mata Fonseca; Attendance: 762; Referee: Flávio Rodrigues de Souza

6 August 2016 12	Remo	1–0	River	Belém
19:00 UTC−3	Fernandinho (yellow card) 35'; Hériclis (yellow card) 68'; Henrique (yellow card) 69'; João Victor 74'; Eduardo Ramos (yellow card) 90+1'	Report	Rafinha (yellow card) 24'; Amarildo (yellow card) 82'; Diego Lira (yellow card) 85'; Luciano Sorriso (yellow card) 86' (yellow-red card) 87'	Stadium: Mangueirão; Attendance: 17,479; Referee: Rodolpho Toski Marques

13 August 2016 13	Botafogo-PB	2–0	Remo	João Pessoa
18:00 UTC−3	Val 37'; Rodrigo Silva 56'; David (yellow card) 76'	Report	Ciro Sena (yellow card) 18'; Fernando Henrique (yellow card) 42'; Hériclis (yellow card) 74'; Murilo (yellow card) 82'	Stadium: Almeidão; Attendance: 6,992; Referee: Francisco de Paula dos Santos Silva Neto

22 August 2016 14	Remo	2–0	Confiança	Belém
19:15 UTC−3	Edno 9', 33'; Yuri (yellow card) 66'; Fernandinho (yellow card) 74'	Report	Felipe Cordeiro (yellow card) 28'; Mimica (yellow card) 46'; Thiago Silvy (yellow card) 55'; Leandro Kivel (yellow card) 79'	Stadium: Mangueirão; Attendance: 8,731; Referee: Rodrigo Nunes de Sá

29 August 2016 15	ABC	2–0	Remo	Natal
19:15 UTC−3	Echeverría 77'; Jones Carioca 86'; Alex Ruan (yellow card) 90+1'	Report	Jussandro (yellow card) 17'; Eduardo Ramos (yellow card) 53'; Fernando Henrique (yellow card) 55'; Fernandinho (yellow card) 57'	Stadium: Frasqueirão; Attendance: 5,441; Referee: Rudimar Goltara

4 September 2016 16	Remo	1–1	Salgueiro	Belém
18:30 UTC−3	Edno 42' (pen.); Allan Dias (yellow card) 53'; Marcinho (yellow card) 58'; Max (yellow card) 67'	Report	Álvaro 9'; Daniel Nazaré (yellow card) 11'; Rodolfo Potiguar (yellow card) 84'; Luciano (yellow card) 90+2'	Stadium: Mangueirão; Attendance: 13,884; Referee: Paulo Henrique Schleich Vollkopf

10 September 2016 17	Fortaleza	4–1	Remo	Fortaleza
20:00 UTC−3	Daniel Sobralense 3', (yellow card) 80'; Corrêa (yellow card) 28', (goal) 68'; Rodrigo Andrade 36'; Juliano (yellow card) 67'; Anselmo (yellow card) 81'; Juninho 83'; Edimar (yellow card) 85'; Lima (yellow card) 88'; Willian Simões (yellow card) 89'	Report	Renato Justi 27'; Yuri (yellow card) 75'; Alisson (yellow card) 89'	Stadium: Arena Castelão; Attendance: 30,803; Referee: Anderson Daronco

18 September 2016 18	Remo	0–0	América de Natal	Belém
19:00 UTC−3	Wellington Saci (yellow card) 45+1'; Yuri (yellow card) 63'; Max (yellow card) 76'	Report	Lucas Bahia (yellow card) 16'; Jussimar (yellow card) 35'; Danilo (yellow card) 61'; Luiz Eduardo (yellow card) 74'; Magno (yellow card) 80'; Ricardo (yellow card) 90+5'	Stadium: Mangueirão; Attendance: 31,906; Referee: Rodrigo Guarizo Ferreira do Amaral

=== Campeonato Paraense ===
==== First round ====
Pos	Team	Pld	W	D	L	GF	GA	GD	Pts	Qualification
1	Remo (A)	4	3	0	1	10	6	+4	9	Qualifies to the Final stage
2	Águia de Marabá (A)	4	2	1	1	8	6	+2	7	Qualifies to the Final stage
3	São Francisco	4	2	1	1	5	3	+2	7	
4	Cametá	4	1	0	3	4	7	−3	3	
5	Parauapebas	4	1	0	3	3	8	−5	3	

(A) Advance to a further round

===== Matches =====
31 January 2016 1	Remo	5–3	Águia de Marabá	Belém
16:00 UTC−3	Eduardo Ramos 36' (pen.); Arthur (yellow card) 42'; Ciro 53', 65', 75'; Marco Goiano 56'	Report	Valdanes 3'; Joãozinho (yellow card) 17'; Mael (yellow card) 52'; Flamel 63', 72'; Léo Rosa (yellow card) 80'	Stadium: Mangueirão; Attendance: 13,886; Referee: Dewson Fernando Freitas da Silva

3 February 2016 2	São Francisco	1–0	Remo	Santarém
20:30 UTC−3	Allan Peterson (yellow card) 56'; Buiú 67'; Andrey (yellow card) 73'	Report		Stadium: Estádio Colosso do Tapajós; Attendance: 4,755; Referee: Gustavo Ramos Melo

17 February 2016 3	Remo	3–1	Parauapebas	Belém
20:30 UTC−3	Ciro 2'; Léo Paraíba 18'; Michel (yellow card) 60'; Max (yellow card) 75'; Levy 81', (yellow card) 82'	Report	Magno 58'; Marlon (yellow card) 86'	Stadium: Mangueirão; Attendance: 6,063; Referee: Joelson Nazareno Ferreira Cardoso

21 February 2016 4	Cametá	1–2	Remo	Cametá
16:00 UTC−3	Frank (yellow card) 34'; Jaílson 54'; Marcelo Maciel (yellow card) 66'	Report	Marco Goiano 10'; Léo Paraíba (yellow card) 45+1'; Max (yellow card) 59'; Ciro 77'	Stadium: Parque do Bacurau; Attendance: 2,565; Referee: Djonaltan Costa de Araújo

===== Final stage =====
27 February 2016 Semi-finals	Remo	1–1 (3–1 p)	Independente	Belém
18:00 UTC−3	Murilo (yellow card) 28'; Eduardo Ramos (yellow card) 37', (goal) 41'; Yuri (yellow card) 71'	Report	Rubran (yellow card) 2'; Ezequias (yellow card) 3'; Alexandre (yellow card) 14'; Monga 45'; Ivson (yellow card) 59'; Dudu (yellow card) 69'; Billy (yellow card) 88'; Cristovam (yellow card) 90+2'	Stadium: Mangueirão; Attendance: 11,794; Referee: Joelson Nazareno Ferreira Cardoso
	Penalties
	Eduardo Ramos (penalty missed); Ciro (penalty scored); Yuri (penalty scored); Murilo (penalty scored)		(penalty missed) Rubran; (penalty missed) Chaveirinho; (penalty scored) Monga; (penalty missed) Ângelo

6 March 2016 Final	Paysandu	1–1 (4–1 p)	Remo	Belém
15:00 UTC−3	Fernando Lombardi (yellow card) 19'; Marcelo Costa 31'; Betinho (yellow card) 43'; Lucas Siqueira (yellow card) 61'; Pablo (yellow card) 69'; Emerson (yellow card) 76', (red card) 82'; Fabinho Alves (yellow card) 83'; Augusto Recife (yellow card) 85'; Roniery (yellow card) 89'	Report	Murilo (yellow card) 26'; Ítalo (yellow card) 43'; Michel (yellow card) 77'; Henrique (yellow card) 79'; Eduardo Ramos 84' (pen.); Ciro (yellow card) 90'; Fernando Henrique (yellow card) 90+2'	Stadium: Mangueirão; Attendance: 15,584; Referee: Joelson Nazareno Ferreira Cardoso
	Penalties
	Leandro Cearense (penalty scored); Bruno Veiga (penalty scored); Augusto Recife (penalty scored); Raphael Luz (penalty scored)		(penalty scored) Eduardo Ramos; (penalty missed) Léo Paraíba; (penalty missed) Ciro

==== Second round ====
Pos	Team	Pld	W	D	L	GF	GA	GD	Pts	Qualification
1	São Francisco (A)	5	2	2	1	6	4	+2	8	Qualifies to the Final stage
2	Cametá (A)	5	2	0	3	5	5	0	6	Qualifies to the Final stage
3	Parauapebas	5	1	2	2	3	5	−2	5	
4	Remo	5	0	4	1	4	5	−1	4	
5	Águia de Marabá	5	0	2	3	3	10	−7	2	

(A) Advance to a further round

===== Matches =====
13 March 2016 1	Paragominas	1–1	Remo	Paragominas
16:00 UTC−3	Aleílson (yellow card) 5'; Balão Marabá (yellow card) 17'; Carlinhos Maraú (yellow card) 21'; San 49'	Report	Eduardo Ramos (yellow card) 7'; Levy (yellow card) 20'; Léo Paraíba 86'	Stadium: Estádio Arena do Município Verde; Attendance: 1,138; Referee: Dewson Fernando Freitas da Silva

19 March 2016 2	Remo	1–1	Independente	Belém
18:00 UTC−3	Yuri (yellow card) 7'; Ciro 9'; Eduardo Ramos (yellow card) 46'; João Victor (yellow card) 65'; Fernando Henrique (yellow card) 86'	Report	Ângelo (yellow card) 35'; Fabrício (yellow card) 35'; Pedro Balú (yellow card) 44'; Leandrinho (yellow card) 73'; Dudu 90+2'	Stadium: Mangueirão; Attendance: 4,501; Referee: Djonaltan Costa de Araújo

27 March 2016 3	Tapajós	1–0	Remo	Santarém
18:00 UTC−3	Jair (yellow card) 54'; Júnior Miranda (yellow card) 60'; Thiago Costa 64'; Ruan (yellow card) 75'	Report		Stadium: Estádio Colosso do Tapajós; Attendance: 269; Referee: Raimundo Gilson Gonçalves de Brito

3 April 2016 4	Paysandu	1–1	Remo	Belém
16:00 UTC−3	Betinho 79'	Report	Eduardo Ramos 36'; Levy (yellow card) 50'	Stadium: Mangueirão; Attendance: 20,181; Referee: Gustavo Ramos Melo

10 April 2016 5	Remo	1–1	São Raimundo	Belém
16:00 UTC−3	Sílvio 16', (yellow card) 28'; Igor João (yellow card) 35'	Report	Charles (yellow card) 18'; Sandro (yellow card) 71' (yellow-red card) 80'; Martony 74'	Stadium: Mangueirão; Attendance: 1,585; Referee: Andrey da Silva e Silva

=== Copa Verde ===
==== Round of 16 ====
10 March 2016 First leg	Náutico-RR	1–3	Remo	Boa Vista
21:30 UTC−3	Alan Caruaru (yellow card) 30' (yellow-red card) 44'; Bruno 87'	Report	Marco Goiano 4'; Yuri 29'; Ciro 40'; Potita (yellow card) 45+1'; Alisson (yellow card) 55'	Stadium: Ribeirão; Attendance: 0 Referee: Antônio Carlos Pequeno Frutuoso

16 March 2016 Second leg	Remo	4–0 (7–1 agg.)	Náutico-RR	Belém
20:00 UTC−3	Marco Goiano 50'; Chicão (yellow card) 54'; Welthon 63', 69', 89'	Report		Stadium: Mangueirão; Attendance: 3,971; Referee: Leandro Cunha de Oliveira

==== Quarter-finals ====
24 March 2016 First leg	Nacional	1–1	Remo	Manaus
21:30 UTC−3	Osvaldir 17', (yellow card) 54'; Fabiano (yellow card) 27'; Rodrigo Dantas (yellow card) 58'; Álvaro (yellow card) 66'	Report	Chicão (yellow card) 16'; Eduardo Ramos 90+1'	Stadium: Estádio Ismael Benigno; Attendance: 3,484; Referee: Rodrigo Batista Raposo

6 April 2016 Second leg	Remo	1–0 (2–1 agg.)	Nacional	Belém
19:00 UTC−3	Ciro (yellow card) 28'; Eduardo Ramos 41'; Luiz Carlos (yellow card) 47'	Report	Fabiano (yellow card) 86'	Stadium: Mangueirão; Attendance: 6,575; Referee: Wagner Reway

==== Semi-finals ====
20 April 2016 First leg	Paysandu	2–1	Remo	Belém
19:30 UTC−3	Lucas Siqueira (yellow card) 18'; Betinho 26'; Ricardo Capanema (yellow card) 47'; Leandro Cearense 76', (yellow card) 77'; Emerson (yellow card) 85'	Report	Ítalo (yellow card) 9'; Luiz Carlos 23'; Ciro (yellow card) 78'; Eduardo Ramos (yellow card) 90+1'	Stadium: Mangueirão; Attendance: 14,118; Referee: Dewson Fernando Freitas da Silva

23 April 2016 Second leg	Remo	2–4 (3–6 agg.)	Paysandu	Belém
18:30 UTC−3	Chicão (yellow card) 12'; Eduardo Ramos (yellow card) 28'; Max (yellow card) 45' (yellow-red card) 73'; Fernando Lombardi 45+5' (o.g.); Ciro 70'	Report	Betinho 29' (pen.); Fabinho Alves (yellow card) 32'; Roniery (yellow card) 36'; Rodrigo Andrade (yellow card) 50', (goal) 63'; Raí 78', 84'	Stadium: Mangueirão; Attendance: 21,537; Referee: Joelson Nazareno Ferreira Cardoso

=== Copa do Brasil ===
==== First round ====
13 April 2016 First leg	Remo	0–1	Vasco da Gama	Belém
21:45 UTC−3	Eduardo Ramos (yellow card) 52'; Lucas Garcia (yellow card) 57'; Max (yellow card) 81'	Report	Madson (yellow card) 19'; Riascos (yellow card) 45+2'; Thalles 85'; Evander (yellow card) 90'	Stadium: Mangueirão; Attendance: 12,568; Referee: Rodolpho Toski Marques

27 April 2016 Second leg	Vasco da Gama	2–1 (3–1 agg.)	Remo	Rio de Janeiro
21:45 UTC−3	Diguinho (yellow card) 47'; Caio Monteiro 63'; Rafael Vaz 69'	Report	Max 75'	Stadium: Estádio São Januário; Attendance: 2,254; Referee: Flávio Rodrigues de Souza
