= 2018 Santa Cruz Futebol Clube season =

Santa Cruz
2018 season
- Chairman: Constantino Junior
- Manager: Júnior Rocha; Adriano Teixeira (c); Paulo C. Gusmão; Roberto Fernandes; João Barata (c)
- Stadium: Estádio do Arruda
- Série C: Quarter-finals
- Pernambucano: Quarter-final
- Copa do Brasil: First round
- Copa do Nordeste: Quarter-finals
- Top goalscorer: League: Pipico (6); All: Robinho (8)
| Home colours | Away colours | Third colours |

The 2018 season was Santa Cruz's 105th season in the club's history. Santa Cruz competed in the Campeonato Pernambucano, Série C, Copa do Brasil and Copa do Nordeste.

== Squad ==
Note: Flags indicate national team as defined under FIFA eligibility rules; some limited exceptions apply. Players may hold more than one non-FIFA nationality.

| No. | Pos. | Nation | Player |
|---|---|---|---|
| 1 | GK | BRA | Tiago Machowski |
| 25 | GK | BRA | Ricardo Ernesto |
| — | GK | BRA | Matheus Cotrim |
| 2 | DF | BRA | Vítor |
| 13 | DF | BRA | Eduardo Brito |
| 3 | DF | BRA | Sandoval |
| 4 | DF | BRA | Danny Morais |
| 20 | DF | BRA | Maílton |
| 4 | DF | BRA | Augusto Silva |
| 3 | DF | BRA | Genílson |
| 6 | DF | BRA | Allan Vieira |
| 8 | MF | BRA | Eduardo |
| 5 | MF | BRA | Charles Almeida |
| 10 | MF | BRA | Jailson |

| No. | Pos. | Nation | Player |
|---|---|---|---|
| 18 | MF | BRA | Héricles |
| 8 | MF | BRA | Arthur Rezende |
| 17 | MF | BRA | Geovani |
| — | MF | BRA | Valdeir |
| 12 | MF | BRA | Carlinhos Paraíba |
| 11 | MF | BRA | Willian Maranhão |
| 16 | MF | BRA | Jeremias |
| 11 | FW | BRA | Leandro Costa |
| 7 | FW | BRA | Robinho |
| 9 | FW | BRA | Pipico |
| 20 | FW | BRA | Halef Pitbull |
| 19 | FW | BRA | Augusto |
| 23 | FW | BRA | Lima |

== Statistics ==
=== Overall ===
| Games played | 40 (8 Copa do Nordeste, 11 Pernambucano, 1 Copa do Brasil, 20 Série C) |
| Games won | 13 (3 Copa do Nordeste, 2 Pernambucano, 0 Copa do Brasil, 8 Série C) |
| Games drawn | 17 (3 Copa do Nordeste, 7 Pernambucano, 0 Copa do Brasil, 7 Série C) |
| Games lost | 10 (2 Copa do Nordeste, 2 Pernambucano, 1 Copa do Brasil, 5 Série C) |
| Goals scored | 44 |
| Goals conceded | 39 |
| Goal difference | +5 |
| Best results (goal difference) | 4–0 (H) v Confiança – Série C – 2018.07.28 |
| Worst result (goal difference) | 1–4 (H) v ABC – Copa do Nordeste – 2018.05.22 |
| Top scorer | Robinho (8) |

Source: Santa Cruz official website

=== Goalscorers ===
| Place | Position | Nationality | Number | Name | Copa do Nordeste | Campeonato Pernambucano | Copa do Brasil | Série C | Total |
|---|---|---|---|---|---|---|---|---|---|
| 1 | MF | (Brazil) | 7 | Robinho | 3 | 1 | 0 | 4 | 8 |
| 2 | FW | (Brazil) | 9 | Pipico | 0 | 0 | 0 | 6 | 6 |
| 3 | FW | (Brazil) | 19 | Augusto | 1 | 2 | 0 | 1 | 4 |
| 3 | MF | (Brazil) | 18 | Héricles | 3 | 1 | 0 | 0 | 4 |
| 4 | MF | (Brazil) | 8 | Arthur Rezende | 1 | 1 | 0 | 1 | 3 |
| 4 | FW | (Brazil) | 7 | Fabinho Alves | 1 | 2 | 0 | 0 | 3 |
| 4 | MF | (Brazil) | 10 | Jailson | 0 | 0 | 0 | 3 | 3 |
| 4 | MF | (Brazil) | 16 | Jeremias | 1 | 1 | 0 | 1 | 3 |
| 5 | MF | (Brazil) | 12 | Carlinhos Paraíba | 0 | 0 | 0 | 2 | 2 |
| 5 | MF | (Brazil) | 5 | Charles Almeida | 0 | 0 | 0 | 2 | 2 |
| 5 | DF | (Brazil) | 2 | Vítor | 1 | 0 | 0 | 1 | 2 |
| 6 | MF | (Brazil) | 17 | Geovani | 0 | 0 | 0 | 1 | 1 |
| 6 | MF | (Brazil) | 5 | Jorginho | 1 | 0 | 0 | 0 | 1 |
| 6 | MF | (Brazil) | 8 | Luiz Otávio | 0 | 1 | 0 | 0 | 1 |
| 6 | FW | (Brazil) | 9 | Robert | 0 | 0 | 0 | 1 | 1 |
| | | | | Total | 12 | 9 | 0 | 23 | 44 |

=== Managers performance ===
| Name | Nationality | From | To | P | W | D | L | GF | GA | Avg% | Ref |
|---|---|---|---|---|---|---|---|---|---|---|---|
| Júnior Rocha | Brazil | 16 January 2018 | 15 April 2018 | 19 | 5 | 11 | 3 | 21 | 19 | 45% | |
| Adriano Teixeira (c) | Brazil | 22 April 2018 | 19 May 2018 | 2 | 1 | 0 | 1 | 5 | 4 | 50% | |
| Paulo César Gusmão | Brazil | 28 April 2018 | 22 May 2018 | 5 | 1 | 2 | 2 | 3 | 6 | 33% | |
| Roberto Fernandes | Brazil | 28 May 2018 | 26 August 2018 | 13 | 6 | 3 | 4 | 15 | 10 | 54% | |
| João Barata (c) | Brazil | 11 June 2018 | 11 June 2018 | 1 | 0 | 1 | 0 | 0 | 0 | 33% | |

(c) Indicates the caretaker manager

== Official Competitions ==
=== Copa do Nordeste ===
==== Group stage ====
| 16 January 2018 1 | Confiança | 1–1 | Santa Cruz | Aracaju |
| 22:45 (UTC-3) | Carlos Frontini 58' | Report | Jorginho 42' | Stadium: Estádio Lourival Baptista (Batistão); Attendance: 2,945; Referee: Diego da Silva Castro |

| 6 February 2018 2 | Santa Cruz | 3–0 | Treze | Recife |
| 22:45 (UTC-3) | Vítor 5'; Jeremias 22'; Arthur Rezende 73' | Report | | Stadium: Estádio José do Rego Maciel (Arruda); Attendance: 0 Referee: Pablo Ramon Goncalves Pinheiro |

| 20 February 2018 3 | Santa Cruz | 2–1 | CRB | Recife |
| 21:45 (UTC-3) | Héricles 55'; Robinho 71' | Report | Edson Ratinho 45+2' | Stadium: Estádio José do Rego Maciel (Arruda); Attendance: 3,015; Referee: Zandick Gondim Alves Junior |

| 10 March 2018 4 | CRB | 1–1 | Santa Cruz | Maceió |
| 16:00 (UTC-3) | Anderson Conceição 31' | Report | Robinho 74' | Stadium: Estádio Rei Pelé; Attendance: 7,024; Referee: Marielson Alves Silva |

| 22 March 2018 5 | Treze | 0–0 | Santa Cruz | Campina Grande |
| 19:00 (UTC-3) | | Report | | Stadium: Estádio Governador Ernani Sátyro (Amigão); Attendance: 3,799; Referee: Jailson Macedo Freitas |

| 28 March 2018 6 | Santa Cruz | 4–1 | Confiança | Recife |
| 19:00 (UTC-3) | Robinho 5'; Fabinho Alves 12'; Héricles 27'; Augusto 71' | Report | Léo Ceará 31' | Stadium: Estádio José do Rego Maciel (Arruda); Attendance: 1,683; Referee: Diego Pombo Lopez |

==== Quarter-finals ====
| 1 May 2018 | ABC | 1–0 | Santa Cruz | Natal |
| 21:45 (UTC-3) | Leandrão 37' | Report | | Stadium: Estádio Maria Lamas Farache (Frasqueirão); Attendance: 2,172; Referee: Luiz César de Oliveira Magalhães |

| 22 May 2018 | Santa Cruz | 1–4 | ABC | Recife |
| 19:00 (UTC-3) | Héricles 84' | Report | Higor Leite 7'; Marcos Júnior 21'; Felipe Guedes 36'; Matheus Carvalho 69' | Stadium: Estádio José do Rego Maciel (Arruda); Attendance: 7,950; Referee: Denis da Silva Ribeiro Serafim |

==== Record ====
| Final Position | Points | Matches | Wins | Draws | Losses | Goals For | Goals Away | Avg% |
|---|---|---|---|---|---|---|---|---|
| 7th | 12 | 8 | 3 | 3 | 2 | 12 | 9 | 50% |

=== Campeonato Pernambucano ===
==== First stage ====
| 18 January 2018 1 | Santa Cruz | 1–1 | Vitória das Tabocas | Recife |
| (UTC-3) | Jeremias 54' | Report | Thomas Anderson 61' | Stadium: Estádio José do Rego Maciel (Arruda); Attendance: 4,292; Referee: Deborah Cecília Cruz Correia |

| 21 January 2018 2 | América–PE | 2–0 | Santa Cruz | Paulista |
| (UTC-3) | Bili 56'; Tiago 68' | Report | | Stadium: Estádio Ademir Cunha; Attendance: 1,874; Referee: José Woshington da Silva |

| 25 January 2018 3 | Santa Cruz | 1–1 | Central | Recife |
| (UTC-3) | Arthur Rezende 15' | Report | Lucas Silva 66' | Stadium: Estádio José do Rego Maciel (Arruda); Attendance: 4,035; Referee: Gleydson Ferreira Leite |

| 3 February 2018 4 | Salgueiro | 1–1 | Santa Cruz | Salgueiro |
| (UTC-3) | Fabiano 55' | Report | Augusto 42' | Stadium: Estádio Cornélio de Barros; Attendance: 1,393; Referee: Nielson Nogueira Dias |

| 14 February 2018 5 | Afogados da Ingazeira | 0–1 | Santa Cruz | Afogados da Ingazeira |
| (UTC-3) | | Report | Augusto 36' | Stadium: Estádio Valdemar Viana de Araújo; Attendance: 2,066; Referee: Péricles Bassols |

| 17 February 2018 6 | Santa Cruz | 0–0 | Náutico | Recife |
| 18:30 (UTC-3) | | Report | | Stadium: Estádio José do Rego Maciel (Arruda); Attendance: 6,015; Referee: Luiz Sobral |

| 25 February 2018 7 | Santa Cruz | 0–0 | Pesqueira | Recife |
| (UTC-3) | | Report | | Stadium: Estádio José do Rego Maciel (Arruda); Referee: Tiago Nascimento |

| 1 March 2018 8 | Flamengo de Arcoverde | 1–1 | Santa Cruz | Arcoverde |
| 20:00 (UTC-3) | Aruá 59' | Report | Héricles 36' | Stadium: Estádio Áureo Bradley; Attendance: 566; Referee: Nielson Nogueira |

| 4 March 2018 9 | Santa Cruz | 3–2 | Belo Jardim | Recife |
| (UTC-3) | Luiz Otávio 45'; Robinho 46'; Fabinho Alves 50' | Report | Kelvis 84'; Jader 90+3' | Stadium: Estádio José do Rego Maciel (Arruda); Attendance: 3,563; Referee: Diego Fernando |

| 7 March 2018 10 | Sport | 1–1 | Santa Cruz | Recife |
| 21:45 (UTC-3) | Thomás Bedinelli 26' | Report | Fabinho Alves 41' | Stadium: Estádio Adelmar da Costa Carvalho (Ilha do Retiro); Attendance: 13,218; Referee: Péricles Bassols |

==== Quarter-final ====
| 14 March 2018 | Sport | 3–0 | Santa Cruz | Recife |
| 21:45 (UTC-3) | Marlone 2'; Anselmo 43', 71' | Report | | Stadium: Estádio Adelmar da Costa Carvalho (Ilha do Retiro); Attendance: 15,180; Referee: Nielson Nogueira Dias |

==== Record ====
| Final Position | Points | Matches | Wins | Draws | Losses | Goals For | Goals Away | Avg% |
|---|---|---|---|---|---|---|---|---|
| 6th | 13 | 11 | 2 | 7 | 2 | 9 | 12 | 39% |

=== Copa do Brasil ===
==== First round ====
| 31 January 2018 | Fluminense de Feira | 2–0 | Santa Cruz | Feira de Santana |
| 22:30 (UTC-3) | Maranhão 41'; Levi 84' | Report | | Stadium: Estádio Municipal Alberto Oliveira (Joia da Princesa); Attendance: 3,480; Referee: Jean Pierre Goncalves Lima |

==== Record ====
| Final Position | Points | Matches | Wins | Draws | Losses | Goals For | Goals Away | Avg% |
|---|---|---|---|---|---|---|---|---|
| 90th | 0 | 1 | 0 | 0 | 1 | 0 | 2 | 0% |

=== Série C ===
==== First stage ====
| 15 April 2018 1 | Náutico | 1–1 | Santa Cruz | São Lourenço da Mata |
| 19:00 (UTC-3) | Ortigoza 26' | Report | Jeremias 82' | Stadium: Estádio Governador Carlos Wilson Campos (Arena Pernambuco); Attendance: 3,204; Referee: Felipe Gomes da Silva |

| 22 April 2018 2 | Santa Cruz | 3–1 | Atlético Acreano | Recife |
| 18:30 (UTC-3) | Geovani 12'; Carlinhos Paraíba 73'; Robert 75' | Report | Araujo Jordão 65' | Stadium: Estádio José do Rego Maciel (Arruda); Attendance: 3,998; Referee: Christiano Gayo Nascimento |

| 28 April 2018 3 | Santa Cruz | 0–0 | ABC | São Lourenço da Mata |
| 16:00 (UTC-3) | | Report | | Stadium: Estádio Governador Carlos Wilson Campos (Arena Pernambuco); Attendance: 8,550; Referee: William Machado Steffen |

| 5 May 2018 4 | Remo | 0–0 | Santa Cruz | Belém |
| 16:00 (UTC-3) | | Report | | Stadium: Estádio Estadual Jornalista Edgar Augusto Proença (Mangueirão); Attendance: 6,357; Referee: José Mendonça da Silva Junior |

| 14 May 2018 5 | Globo | 1–2 | Santa Cruz | Ceará-Mirim |
| 21:15 (UTC-3) | Romarinho 73' | Report | Robinho 81'; Charles Almeida 83' | Stadium: Estádio Manoel Dantas Barretto (Barrettão); Attendance: 242; Referee: Wanderson Alves de Sousa |

| 19 May 2018 6 | Santa Cruz | 2–3 | Botafogo–PB | Recife |
| 19:00 (UTC-3) | Carlinhos Paraíba 45+1'; Robinho 57' | Report | Mazinho 34'; Dico 73'; Nando 82' | Stadium: Estádio José do Rego Maciel (Arruda); Attendance: 14,101; Referee: José Cláudio Rocha Filho |

| 28 May 2018 7 | Confiança | 1–1 | Santa Cruz | Aracaju |
| 19:00 (UTC-3) | Léo Ceará 53' | Report | Robinho 74' | Stadium: Estádio Lourival Baptista (Batistão); Attendance: 8,629; Referee: Marco Aurelio Augusto Fazekas Ferreira |

| 2 June 2018 8 | Santa Cruz | 1–0 | Juazeirense | Recife |
| 18:00 (UTC-3) | Robinho 31' | Report | | Stadium: Estádio José do Rego Maciel (Arruda); Attendance: 5,188; Referee: Luiz César de Oliveira Magalhães |

| 11 June 2018 9 | Salgueiro | 0–0 | Santa Cruz | Salgueiro |
| 19:30 (UTC-3) | | Report | | Stadium: Estádio Cornélio de Barros; Attendance: 1,212; Referee: Adriano Milczvski |

| 18 June 2018 10 | Santa Cruz | 0–1 | Náutico | Recife |
| 21:15 (UTC-3) | | Report | Wallace Pernambucano 71' | Stadium: Estádio José do Rego Maciel (Arruda); Attendance: 6,505; Referee: Edmar Campos Encarnação |

| 24 June 2018 11 | Atlético Acreano | 2–1 | Santa Cruz | Rio Branco |
| 20:00 (UTC-5) | Rafael 20'; Eduardo 75' | Report | Jailson 17' | Stadium: Estádio Antônio Aquino Lopes (Florestão); Attendance: 1,355; Referee: Salim Fende Chavez |

| 1 July 2018 12 | ABC | 0–3 | Santa Cruz | Natal |
| 18:00 (UTC-3) | | Report | Pipico 16', 22'; Jailson 55' | Stadium: Estádio Maria Lamas Farache (Frasqueirão); Attendance: 1,178; Referee: Ronei Cândido Alves |

| 8 July 2018 13 | Santa Cruz | 2–0 | Remo | Recife |
| 17:00 (UTC-3) | Pipico 11'; Charles Almeida 89' | Report | | Stadium: Estádio José do Rego Maciel (Arruda); Attendance: 14,782; Referee: Rodrigo Nunes de Sá |

| 14 July 2018 14 | Santa Cruz | 1–1 | Globo | Recife |
| 19:00 (UTC-3) | Pipico 80' | Report | Max 90+3' | Stadium: Estádio José do Rego Maciel (Arruda); Attendance: 13,543; Referee: Felipe Fernandes de Lima |

| 21 July 2018 15 | Botafogo–PB | 2–0 | Santa Cruz | João Pessoa |
| 19:00 (UTC-3) | Marcos Aurélio 40', 71' | Report | | Stadium: Estádio José Américo de Almeida Filho (Almeidão); Attendance: 5,629; Referee: André Rodrigo Rocha |

| 28 July 2018 16 | Santa Cruz | 4–0 | Confiança | Recife |
| 15:30 (UTC-3) | Arthur Rezende 5'; Pipico 29', 84'; Jailson 81' | Report | | Stadium: Estádio José do Rego Maciel (Arruda); Attendance: 8,700; Referee: Leonardo Sígari Zanon |

| 5 August 2018 17 | Juazeirense | 0–0 | Santa Cruz | Juazeiro |
| 19:00 (UTC-3) | | Report | | Stadium: Estádio Adauto Moraes; Attendance: 1,084; Referee: Wagner Reway |

| 11 August 2018 18 | Santa Cruz | 1–0 | Salgueiro | Recife |
| 19:30 (UTC-3) | Augusto 55' | Report | | Stadium: Estádio José do Rego Maciel (Arruda); Attendance: 9,998; Referee: Bráulio da Silva Machado |

==== Quarter-finals ====
| 19 August 2018 | Santa Cruz | 1–0 | Operário Ferroviário | Recife |
| 17:00 (UTC-3) | Vítor 45' | Report | | Stadium: Estádio José do Rego Maciel (Arruda); Attendance: 49,476; Referee: Wagner do Nascimento Magalhães |

| 26 August 2018 | Operário Ferroviário | 3–0 | Santa Cruz | Ponta Grossa |
| 15:00 (UTC-3) | Alisson 21'; Schumacher 72'; Dione 78' | Report | | Stadium: Estádio Germano Krüger; Attendance: 6,477; Referee: Raphael Claus |

==== Record ====
| Final Position | Points | Matches | Wins | Draws | Losses | Goals For | Goals Away | Avg% |
|---|---|---|---|---|---|---|---|---|
| 7th | 32 | 20 | 8 | 7 | 5 | 23 | 16 | 53% |
