= 2017 Copa Verde finals =

- Event: 2017 Copa Verde
Luverdense	Paysandu
(Mato Grosso)	(Pará)
4	2
- on aggregate

First leg
Luverdense	Paysandu
3	1
- Date: 4 May 2017
- Venue: Arena Pantanal, Cuiabá
- Referee: Sávio Sampaio
- Attendance: 1,853

Second leg
Paysandu	Luverdense
1	1
- Date: 16 May 2017
- Venue: Mangueirão, Belém
- Referee: Rodrigo Batista Raposo
- Attendance: 26,653

The 2017 Copa Verde finals was the final two-legged tie that decided the 2017 Copa Verde, the 4th season of the Copa Verde, Brazil's regional cup football tournament organised by the Brazilian Football Confederation.

The finals were contested in a two-legged home-and-away format between Luverdense, from Mato Grosso, and Paysandu, from Pará.

Luverdense defeated Paysandu 4–2 on aggregate to win their first Copa Verde title.

== Teams ==
Team	Previous finals appearances (bold indicates winners)
(Mato Grosso) Luverdense	None
(Pará) Paysandu	2 (2014, **2016**)

=== Road to the final ===
Note: In all scores below, the score of the finalist is given first.

(Mato Grosso) Luverdense			Round	(Pará) Paysandu		
Opponent	Venue	Score		Opponent	Venue	Score
Bye			Preliminary round	Bye		
(Federal District (Brazil)) Ceilândia (won 4–1 on aggregate)	Away	1–0	Round of 16	(Acre (state)) Galvez (won 2–0 on aggregate)	Away	0–0
(Federal District (Brazil)) Ceilândia (won 4–1 on aggregate)	Home	3–1	Round of 16	(Acre (state)) Galvez (won 2–0 on aggregate)	Home	2–0
(Espírito Santo) Rio Branco (won 7–2 on aggregate)	Home	5–0	Quarter-finals	(Pará) Águia de Marabá (won 3–1 on aggregate)	Away	2–1
(Espírito Santo) Rio Branco (won 7–2 on aggregate)	Away	2–2	Quarter-finals	(Pará) Águia de Marabá (won 3–1 on aggregate)	Home	1–0
(Rondônia) Rondoniense (won 5–2 on aggregate)	Away	2–1	Semi-finals	(Amapá) Santos (won 4–2 on aggregate)	Away	1–1
(Rondônia) Rondoniense (won 5–2 on aggregate)	Home	3–1	Semi-finals	(Amapá) Santos (won 4–2 on aggregate)	Home	3–1

== Format ==
The finals were played on a home-and-away two-legged basis. If tied on aggregate, the penalty shoot-out was used to determine the winner.

== Matches ==
=== First leg ===
4 May 2017
19:30 AMT (UTC−4)

Luverdense (Mato Grosso)	3–1	(Pará) Paysandu
Erik 11'; Marcos Aurélio 42'; Dalton 55'	Report	Daniel Sobralense 6'

Arena Pantanal, Cuiabá
Attendance: 1,853
Referee: Sávio Sampaio (Distrito Federal)

**Luverdense**	**Paysandu**

GK	1	(Brazil) Diogo Silva
DF	2	(Brazil) Aderlan		(substituted off) 74'
DF	3	(Brazil) Pierre
DF	4	(Brazil) Dalton
DF	6	(Brazil) Paulinho (c)
MF	5	(Brazil) Erik		(yellow card) 60'
MF	8	(Brazil) Ricardo
MF	10	(Brazil) Marcos Aurélio	(yellow card) 71'	(substituted off) 72'
MF	11	(Brazil) Rafael Silva		(substituted off) 63'
FW	7	(Brazil) Douglas Baggio
FW	9	(Brazil) Raphael Macena
Substitutes:
GK	12	(Brazil) Gabriel Leite
DF	13	(Brazil) William
DF	14	(Brazil) Gabriel Passos		(substituted in) 74'
MF	19	(Brazil) Pedro Augusto
MF	20	(Brazil) Alaor		(substituted in) 72'
FW	16	(Brazil) Rodrigo Fumaça		(substituted in) 63'
FW	17	(Brazil) Café
Coach:
(Brazil) Júnior Rocha

GK	1	(Brazil) Emerson
DF	40	(Brazil) Hayner	(red card) 59'
DF	3	(Brazil) Fernando Lombardi	(yellow card) 69'
DF	14	(Brazil) Pablo
DF	6	(Brazil) Willian Simões
MF	8	(Brazil) Augusto Recife (c)	(yellow card) 41'
MF	18	(Brazil) Jhonnatan	(substituted off) 63'
MF	32	(Brazil) Rodrigo Andrade
MF	20	(Brazil) Daniel Sobralense	(substituted off) 80'
FW	36	(Brazil) Leandro Carvalho
FW	9	(Brazil) Leandro Cearense	(substituted off) 19'
Substitutes:
GK	12	(Brazil) Marcão
DF	2	(Brazil) Ayrton	(substituted in) 19'
DF	26	(Brazil) Perema
MF	5	(Brazil) Ricardo Capanema
MF	10	(Brazil) Diogo Oliveira	(substituted in) 80'
FW	21	(Brazil) Will	(substituted in) 63'
FW	28	(Brazil) Alfredo
FW	37	(Brazil) Aslen
Coach:
(Brazil) Marcelo Chamusca

Assistant referees:
José Reinaldo Nascimento Júnior (Distrito Federal)
Leila Naiara Moreira da Cruz (Distrito Federal)
Fourth official:
Marcelo Alves dos Santos (Mato Grosso)

=== Second leg ===
16 May 2017
20:00 BRT (UTC−3)

Paysandu (Pará)	1–1	(Mato Grosso) Luverdense
Leandro Carvalho 4'	Report	Rafael Silva 78' (pen.)

Mangueirão, Belém
Attendance: 26,653
Referee: Rodrigo Batista Raposo (Distrito Federal)

**Paysandu**	**Luverdense**

GK	1	(Brazil) Emerson		(substituted off) 46'
DF	2	(Brazil) Ayrton
DF	26	(Brazil) Perema
DF	4	(Brazil) Gilvan
DF	6	(Brazil) Willian Simões		(substituted off) 73'
MF	15	(Brazil) Wesley		(yellow card) 53'
MF	32	(Brazil) Rodrigo Andrade
MF	10	(Brazil) Diogo Oliveira
FW	36	(Brazil) Leandro Carvalho		(yellow card) 43'
FW	30	(Brazil) Bergson		(substituted off) 64'
FW	28	(Brazil) Alfredo
Substitutes:
GK	12	(Brazil) Marcão	(yellow card) 77'	(substituted in) 46'
DF	3	(Brazil) Fernando Lombardi
DF	14	(Brazil) Pablo
MF	5	(Brazil) Ricardo Capanema
MF	8	(Brazil) Augusto Recife
MF	18	(Brazil) Jhonnatan
MF	20	(Brazil) Daniel Sobralense	(yellow card) 20'	(substituted in) 73'
FW	21	(Brazil) Will		(substituted in) 64'
FW	37	(Brazil) Aslen
Coach:
(Brazil) Marcelo Chamusca

GK	1	(Brazil) Diogo Silva		(yellow card) 4'
DF	2	(Brazil) Aderlan
DF	3	(Brazil) Pierre
DF	4	(Brazil) Dalton		(substituted off) 16'
DF	6	(Brazil) Paulinho (c)
MF	8	(Brazil) Ricardo		(yellow card) 49'
MF	10	(Brazil) Marcos Aurélio		(substituted off) 85'
MF	7	(Brazil) Douglas Baggio
FW	11	(Brazil) Rafael Silva
FW	5	(Brazil) Erik		(yellow card) 54'
FW	9	(Brazil) Raphael Macena		(substituted off) 75'
Substitutes:
GK	12	(Brazil) Gabriel Leite
DF	13	(Brazil) Neguete		(substituted in) 16'
DF	14	(Brazil) Gabriel Passos
MF	15	(Brazil) Gabriel Kazu
MF	19	(Brazil) Pedro Augusto
MF	20	(Brazil) Alaor		(substituted in) 85'
FW	16	(Brazil) Rodrigo Fumaça	(yellow card) 79'	(substituted in) 75'
FW	17	(Brazil) Café
FW	18	(Brazil) Leandro Augusto
Coach:
(Brazil) Júnior Rocha

Assistant referees:
Daniel Henrique da Silva Andrade (Distrito Federal)
Ciro Chaban Junqueira (Distrito Federal)
Fourth official:
Andrey da Silva e Silva (Pará)

== See also ==
- 2018 Copa do Brasil
