= 2016 Campeonato Paraense final =

- Event: 2016 Campeonato Paraense
Paysandu	São Francisco
2	1
- Date: 7 May 2016
- Venue: Mangueirão, Belém
- Referee: Dewson Fernando Freitas da Silva
- Attendance: 18,225

The 2016 Campeonato Paraense final was the final that decided the 2016 Campeonato Paraense, the 104th season of the Campeonato Paraense. The final were contested between Paysandu and São Francisco.

Paysandu defeated São Francisco 2–1 to win their 46th Campeonato Paraense title.

== Teams ==
Team	Qualification method
Paysandu	Taça Cidade de Belém winners
São Francisco	Taça Estado do Pará winners

== Match ==
=== Details ===
7 May 2016
18:00 UTC−3

Paysandu	2–1	São Francisco
Fernando Lombardi 1'; Fabinho Alves 54'	Report	Andrelino 28'

Mangueirão, Belém
Attendance: 18,225
Referee: Dewson Fernando Freitas da Silva

Paysandu	São Francisco

GK	1	(Brazil) Emerson
DF	2	(Brazil) Roniery		(substituted off) 73'
DF	3	(Brazil) Fernando Lombardi		(yellow card) 21'
DF	26	(Brazil) Gualberto
DF	25	(Brazil) Lucas Siqueira
MF	5	(Brazil) Ricardo Capanema
MF	8	(Brazil) Augusto Recife (c)		(yellow card) 69'
MF	6	(Brazil) Raí		(substituted off) 46'
MF	20	(Brazil) Celsinho
FW	11	(Brazil) Fabinho Alves
FW	9	(Brazil) Leandro Cearense		(substituted off) 76'
Substitutes:
MF	32	(Brazil) Rodrigo Andrade	(yellow card) 80'	(substituted in) 73'
MF	16	(Brazil) Raphael Luz	(yellow card) 85'	(substituted in) 46'
FW	19	(Brazil) Betinho		(substituted in) 76'
Coach:
(Brazil) Dado Cavalcanti

GK	1	(Brazil) Paulo Rafael
DF	2	(Brazil) Andrey	(yellow card) 40'	(substituted off) 66'
DF	3	(Brazil) Carlinhos Rocha		(yellow card) 45'
DF	4	(Brazil) Perema (c)		(yellow card) 86'
DF	6	(Brazil) Andrelino	(yellow card) 67'	(substituted off) 82'
MF	5	(Brazil) Douglas
MF	7	(Brazil) Rodrigo Santarém		(substituted off) 81'
MF	8	(Brazil) Juninho
MF	10	(Brazil) Samuel
FW	11	(Brazil) Elielton
FW	9	(Brazil) Kennedy Balotelli
Substitutes:
DF	14	(Brazil) Mocajuba		(substituted in) 82'
DF	19	(Brazil) Guilherme		(substituted in) 66'
MF	21	(Brazil) Allan Petterson		(substituted in) 81'
Coach:
(Brazil) Walter Lima

Assistant referees:
Hélcio Araújo Neves (Pará)
José Ricardo Guimarães Coimbra (Pará)
Fourth official:
Gustavo Ramos Melo (Pará)
Fifth official:
Djonaltan Costa Araújo (Pará)

== See also ==
- 2017 Copa Verde
- 2017 Copa do Brasil
