= 2016 Campeonato Paraense =

Campeonato Paraense de Futebol
- Season: 2016
- Champions: Paysandu
- Relegated: Tapajós; Parauapebas
- Série D: São Francisco; São Raimundo
- Copa Verde: Paysandu
- Copa do Brasil: Paysandu (via Copa Verde); São Francisco; São Raimundo; Remo
- Matches played: 52
- Goals scored: 134 (2.58 per match)
- Top goalscorer: Jerferson Monte Alegre (8 goals)
- Biggest home win: Remo 5–3 Águia de Marabá (31 January 2016)
- Biggest away win: São Raimundo 2–5 Paysandu (14 February 2016)
- Highest scoring: Remo 5–3 Águia de Marabá (31 January 2016); São Raimundo 2–5 Paysandu (14 February 2016)
- Highest attendance: 20,181; Paysandu 1–1 Remo (3 April 2016)
- Lowest attendance: 307; Águia de Marabá 0–0 Tapajós (19 March 2016)

The 2016 Campeonato Paraense de Futebol was the 104th edition of Pará's top professional football league. The competition started on 30 January and ended on 8 May. Paysandu won the championship for the 46th time.

== Format ==
The clubs play each other within their group, with two from each group qualifying for the semi-finals of the first round. In the second round the clubs play against clubs from the other group, with two from each group qualifying for the semi-finals of the second round. If each stage has a separate winner there will be a match between the winners of each round to see who will be the champion.

The worst two teams are relegated to Second Division.

The champion qualifies to the 2017 Copa Verde. The champion, the runner-up and the 3rd-placed team qualify to the 2017 Copa do Brasil. The best team who isn't on Campeonato Brasileiro Série A, Série B or Série C qualifies for Série D.

== Participating teams ==
Club	Home city	2015 result
Águia de Marabá	Marabá	1st (on 2nd Division)
Cametá	Cametá	5th
Independente Tucuruí	Tucuruí	2nd
Paragominas	Paragominas	6th
Parauapebas	Parauapebas	3rd
Paysandu	Belém	4th
Remo	Belém	1st
São Francisco	Santarém	7th
São Raimundo	Santarém	2nd (on 2nd Division)
Tapajós	Santarém	8th

== First round ==
=== Group A1 ===
Pos	Team	Pld	W	D	L	GF	GA	GD	Pts	Qualification	REM	AGM	SFR	CAM	PRB
1	Remo (A)	4	3	0	1	10	6	+4	9	Qualifies to the Final stage		5–3			3–1
2	Águia de Marabá (A)	4	2	1	1	8	6	+2	7	Qualifies to the Final stage			1–1		1–0
3	São Francisco	4	2	1	1	5	3	+2	7		1–0			0–2	
4	Cametá	4	1	0	3	4	7	−3	3		1–2	0–3			
5	Parauapebas	4	1	0	3	3	8	−5	3				0–3	2–1	

(A) Advance to a further round

=== Group A2 ===
Pos	Team	Pld	W	D	L	GF	GA	GD	Pts	Qualification	PAY	IND	SRA	PAR	TAP
1	Paysandu (A)	4	4	0	0	13	3	+10	12	Qualifies to the Final stage				3–0	4–1
2	Independente (A)	4	2	1	1	7	6	+1	7	Qualifies to the Final stage	0–1			3–2	
3	São Raimundo	4	1	2	1	9	11	−2	5		2–5	2–2			
4	Paragominas	4	1	0	3	6	10	−4	3				2–3		2–1
5	Tapajós	4	0	1	3	5	10	−5	1			1–2	2–2		

(A) Advance to a further round

=== Semifinals ===
27 February 2016
18:00 UTC –3

Remo	1–1	Independente
Eduardo Ramos 41'	Report	Monga 45'
Penalties
Eduardo Ramos (penalty missed); Ciro (penalty scored); Yuri (penalty scored); Murilo (penalty scored)	3–1	(penalty missed) Rubran; (penalty missed) Chaveirinho; (penalty scored) Monga; (penalty missed) Ângelo

Mangueirão, Belém
Attendance: 11,794
Referee: Joelson Nazareno Ferreira Cardoso

28 February 2016
16:00 UTC –3

Paysandu	0–0	Águia de Marabá
	Report
Penalties
Leandro Cearense (penalty scored); Raphael Luz (penalty scored); Augusto Recife (penalty scored); Lucas (penalty scored)	4–2	(penalty scored) Flamel; (penalty scored) Bernardo; (penalty missed) Joãozinho; (penalty missed) Eric

Mangueirão, Belém
Attendance: 11,724
Referee: André Luiz de Freitas Castro

=== Final ===
6 March 2016
15:00 UTC –3

Paysandu	1–1	Remo
Marcelo Costa 31'	Report	Eduardo Ramos 84' (pen.)
Penalties
Leandro Cearense (penalty scored); Bruno Veiga (penalty scored); Augusto Recife (penalty scored); Raphael Luz (penalty scored)	4–1	(penalty scored) Eduardo Ramos; (penalty missed) Léo Paraíba; (penalty missed) Ciro

Mangueirão, Belém
Attendance: 15,584
Referee: Joelson Nazareno Ferreira Cardoso

Paysandu won the first round of Campeonato Paraense.

== Second round ==
=== Group A ===
Pos	Team	Pld	W	D	L	GF	GA	GD	Pts	Qualification
1	São Francisco (A)	5	2	2	1	6	4	+2	8	Qualifies to the Final stage
2	Cametá (A)	5	2	0	3	5	5	0	6	Qualifies to the Final stage
3	Parauapebas	5	1	2	2	3	5	−2	5	
4	Remo	5	0	4	1	4	5	−1	4	
5	Águia de Marabá	5	0	2	3	3	10	−7	2	

(A) Advance to a further round

=== Group B ===
Pos	Team	Pld	W	D	L	GF	GA	GD	Pts	Qualification
1	São Raimundo (A)	5	3	1	1	8	5	+3	10	Qualifies to the Final stage
2	Paragominas (A)	5	3	1	1	7	4	+3	10	Qualifies to the Final stage
3	Tapajós	5	2	1	2	4	5	−1	7	
4	Paysandu	5	1	4	0	5	4	+1	7	
5	Independente	5	1	3	1	5	3	+2	6	

(A) Advance to a further round

=== Results ===
Home \ Away	AGM	CAM	PRB	REM	SFR	IND	PAR	PAY	SRA	TAP
Águia de Marabá								2–2		0–0
Cametá						1–0	1–2			2–0
Parauapebas								1–1	0–1	1–3
Remo						1–1			1–1	
São Francisco							1–2		2–1	
Independente	3–0		0–0		1–1					
Paragominas	2–0		0–1	1–1						
Paysandu		1–0		1–1	0–0					
São Raimundo	3–1	2–1								
Tapajós				1–0	0–2					

Legend: Blue = home team win; Yellow = draw; Red = away team win.

=== Semifinals ===
16 April 2016
19:30 UTC –3

São Francisco	1–1	Paragominas
Paulo Rafael 57' (pen.)		Caiquinha 84'
Penalties
Guilherme Neves (penalty scored); Samuel (penalty scored); Juninho (penalty scored); Andrelino (penalty missed); Paulo Rafael (penalty scored); Andrelino (penalty scored); Ricardinho (penalty scored)	6–5	(penalty scored) Aleílson; (penalty scored) Rondinelli; (penalty missed) Daniel; (penalty scored) Laio; (penalty scored) Romário; (penalty scored) Carlinhos; (penalty missed) Redson

Colosso do Tapajós, Santarém
Attendance: 3,010
Referee: Dewson Fernando Freitas da Silva

17 April 2016
18:00 UTC –3

São Raimundo	1–1	Cametá
Bilau 53'		Tony Love 32'
Penalties
Jefferson Monte Alegre (penalty scored); Manoel (penalty missed); Marcos Vinícius (penalty missed); Cristian (penalty scored)	2–4	(penalty scored) Tony Love; (penalty missed) Renan; (penalty scored) Preto Barcarena; (penalty scored) Jaílson; (penalty scored) Marcelo Maciel

Colosso do Tapajós, Santarém
Attendance: 4,681
Referee: Gustavo Ramos de Melo

=== Final ===
24 April 2016
18:00 UTC –3

São Francisco	3–0	Cametá
Juninho 19'; Elielton 38'; Paulo Rafael 68' (pen.)	Report

Colosso do Tapajós, Santarém
Attendance: 5,254
Referee: Benedito Pinto da Silva

São Francisco won the second round of Campeonato Paraense.

== Final ==
7 May 2016
18:00 UTC –3

Paysandu	2–1	São Francisco
Fernando Lombardi 1'; Fabinho Alves 54'	Report	Andrelino 28'

Mangueirão, Belém
Attendance: 18,225
Referee: Dewson Fernando Freitas da Silva
