= Patrick da Silva =

Patrick da Silva may refer to:

- Patrick (footballer, born 1985) (Patrick Roberto Daniel da Silva), Brazilian footballer
- Patrick da Silva (Danish footballer) (born 1994)
- Patrick (footballer, born 2000) (Patrick da Silva Ferreira Souza), Brazilian footballer
- Patrick Leonardo (Patrick Leonardo Carneiro da Silva, born 1990), Brazilian footballer

== See also ==
- Patrik Silva (Patrik Camilo Cornélio da Silva, born 1990), Brazilian footballer
- Patrick de Silva Kularatne (1893–1976), Sri Lankan educationist and politician
