= Milton Nienov =

Brazilian goalkeeper coach

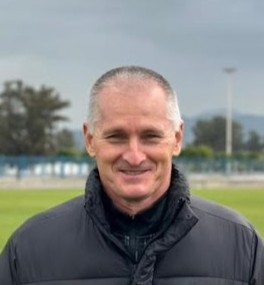

Personal information
- Date of birth: 29 March 1968 (age 58)
- Place of birth: Palmitos, Brazil
- Height: 1.90 m (6 ft 3 in)
- Position: Goalkeeper

Managerial career
- Years: Team
- 2001–2005: Figueirense (goalkeeping coach)
- 2005–2007: Sport Recife (goalkeeping coach)
- 2007–2008: Vasco da Gama (goalkeeping coach)
- 2009–2014: Free State Stars (goalkeeping coach)
- 2014–2015: Polokwane City (goalkeeping coach)
- 2015: Super Eagles FC (technical director)
- 2015–2017: Golden Arrows (goalkeeping coach)
- 2018–2020: Polokwane City (assistant)
- 2021: Simba (goalkeeping coach)
- 2022–2023: Young Africans (goalkeeping coach)
- 2023–2024: Botswana (goalkeeping coach)
- 2024: Avaí (assistant)
- 2024–2025: Al-Merrikh (assistant)
- 2025: Al-Khor (assistant)
- 2026: Figueirense U20

Milton Nienov (born 29 March 1968) is a Brazilian football coach and former professional goalkeeper. He has over 12 years of playing experience and 26 years of coaching experience, having worked with clubs and national teams in Brazil, South Africa, Tanzania, Botswana, Sudan and Qatar.

== Playing career ==
Nienov began his youth career as a footballer with Brazilian club Chapecoense, playing as a goalkeeper, and going on to make his professional debut with Figueirense. He also played with several clubs in the Brazilian football league system, such as ABC, Brasil de Farroupilha and Esportivo.

== Managerial career ==
Milton Nienov obtained his CBF A and CBF Pro License with the Brazilian Football Confederation.

In 2001, he joined Figueirense FC, working for the club for four years until 2005. He later signed for Sport Recife between 2005 and 2007, and Vasco da Gama in 2007 until 2008. In 2009, he signed with South African club Free State Stars F.C. for five years until 2014, and later, Polokwane City F.C. for a year until 2015. He also worked at Simba S.C. between 2021 and 2022, Young Africans S.C. between 2022 and 2023, Al-Merrikh between 2024 and 2025, Al-Khor in 2025, and most recently, the Figueirense under-20 squad. He has also had other roles, such as technical director, with Super Eagles.

He was called up to the technical team of the Botswana national football team in the qualifiers of the 2026 FIFA World Cup.

== Personal life ==
Nienov was born in Brazil on 29 March 1968, in Palmitos. His son, Gustavo Martins Nienov, is also a footballer, having played for the U20 team of Clube Atlético Catarinense and the U21 team of Pedra Branca Esporte Club.

== Honours ==
=== Player ===
Figueirense

- Copa Santa Catarina 1990

Brasil de Farroupilha

- Campeonato Gaúcho Série A2 1992

ABC Futebol Clube

- Campeonato Potiguar: 1995

=== Coach ===
Figueirense

- Campeonato Catarinense: 2002, 2003, 2004

Sport Recife

- Campeonato Pernambucano: 2006, 2007

Simba

- Tanzanian Premier League: 2020–21
- Tanzania FA Cup: 2020–21

Young Africans

- Tanzanian Premier League: 2021–22, 2022–23
- Tanzania FA Cup: 2021–22, 2022–23
- Tanzania Community Shield: 2022
