= Michel Schmöller =

Brazilian footballer (born 1987)

Personal information
- Full name: Michel Vendelino Schmöller
- Date of birth: 11 November 1987 (age 38)
- Place of birth: São Jorge d'Oeste, Paraná, Brazil
- Height: 1.84 m (6 ft 0 in)
- Position: Defensive midfielder

Team information
- Current team: Atlético Catarinense

Youth career
- Figueirense

Senior career*
Years	Team	Apps	(Gls)
2007–2010	Figueirense	4	(0)
2008	→ Atlético Goianiense (loan)	2	(0)
2010	Brasiliense	22	(0)
2011	Cartagena	5	(0)
2012	América-RN	15	(0)
2013	Ituano	6	(0)
2013–2014	ABC	28	(1)
2014	Remo	10	(2)
2015	Inter de Lages	17	(0)
2015	Luverdense	11	(0)
2016	Inter de Lages	19	(1)
2016	Remo	16	(0)
2017	Inter de Lages	16	(1)
2017	Bangu	0	(0)
2017	CSA	4	(0)
2018	Joinville	34	(2)
2018	Brasil de Pelotas	3	(0)
2019	Metropolitano	16	(0)
2019	Inter de Lages	14	(1)
2020	Palmeira	8	(0)
2020	Pelotas	2	(0)
2020	Inter de Lages	5	(0)
2020–	Atlético Catarinense	10	(0)
- * Club domestic league appearances and goals as of 17:48, 15 July 2021 (UTC)

Michel Vendelino Schmöller (born 11 November 1987) is a Brazilian footballer who plays as a defensive midfielder for Club Atlético Catarinense.

== Career ==
He started his career playing at Figueirense's youth division. Schmöller left in September 2008 Figueirense and played two games on loan for Atlético-GO, before returning in December 2008.

Schmöller played in Campeonato Brasileiro Série B with Figueirense and Brasiliense before joining Segunda División side Cartagena on a short-term deal in January 2011.
