= Ricardo Ernesto =

Brazilian footballer

Personal information
- Full name: Ricardo Ernesto Ahlf
- Date of birth: 1986 (age 39–40)
- Place of birth: Palmitos, Brazil
- Height: 1.88 m (6 ft 2 in)
- Position: Goalkeeper

Team information
- Current team: FC Cascavel

Youth career
- Chapecoense

Senior career*
| Years | Team | Apps | (Gls) |
| 2005–2010 | Chapecoense | 5 | (0) |
| 2010–2013 | Figueirense | 28 | (0) |
| 2013 | Icasa | 1 | (0) |
| 2014 | Fortaleza | 20 | (0) |
| 2015 | Oeste | 0 | (0) |
| 2016 | Votuporanguense | 12 | (0) |
| 2016 | Brusque | 0 | (0) |
| 2016 | América-RN | 5 | (0) |
| 2017 | Glória | 11 | (0) |
| 2017 | Guarany-CE | 11 | (0) |
| 2017 | Brusque | 0 | (0) |
| 2018–2019 | Santa Cruz | 21 | (0) |
| 2020– | FC Cascavel | 2 | (0) |
- * Club domestic league appearances and goals as of 14:33, 25 November 2014 (UTC)

Ricardo Ernesto Ahlf (born 1986, in Palmitos), known as Ricardo Ernesto, is a Brazilian footballer who currently plays for FC Cascavel.
