= Mazinho (footballer, born 1988) =

Brazilian footballer

Personal information
- Full name: Osmar dos Santos Filho
- Date of birth: 25 December 1988 (age 37)
- Place of birth: Garopaba, Brazil
- Height: 1.76 m (5 ft 9 in)
- Position: Midfielder

Senior career*
Years	Team	Apps	(Gls)
2010	Guaratinguetá	0	(0)
2011	Concórdia-SC	0	(0)
2011	Salgueiro	0	(0)
2011	Tubarão-SC	0	(0)
2012	São Paulo-RS	0	(0)
2012	Guarany Bagé	0	(0)
2013	Juventus SC	0	(0)
2013	América Mineiro	0	(0)
2013	Novo Hamburgo	14	(2)
2014	Brusque	0	(0)
2014–2016	Tombense	14	(0)
2015	→ Metropolitano (loan)	5	(2)
2016	→ Novo Hamburgo (loan)	0	(0)
2017	Metropolitano	0	(0)
2017	Brusque	4	(0)
2018	Botafogo PB	8	(1)
2018	Perseru Serui	12	(3)
2019–2020	Caldense	2	(0)
- * Club domestic league appearances and goals

Osmar dos Santos Filho, commonly known as Mazinho (born 25 December 1988) is a Brazilian former professional footballer who played as a midfielder.

== Career ==
Mazinho transferred from Juventus SC to América Mineiro in March 2013.

In late 2018, Mazinho joined Caldense in the Campeonato Mineiro. He played two times in the 2019 Campeonato Mineiro.

== Career statistics ==
Appearances and goals by club, season and competition
Club	Season	League			National Cup		Continental		Other		Total	
Club	Season	Division	Apps	Goals	Apps	Goals	Apps	Goals	Apps	Goals	Apps	Goals
Guaratinguetá Futebol	2010	Campeonato Brasileiro Série B	0	0	0	0	0	0	0	0	0	0
Guaratinguetá Futebol	Total		0	0	0	0	0	0	0	0	0	0
Juventus (Santa Catarina)	2013	Campeonato Catarinense	10	0	0	0	0	0	0	0	10	0
Juventus (Santa Catarina)	Total		10	0	0	0	0	0	0	0	10	0
América Mineiro	2013	Campeonato Mineiro	1	0	2	0	0	0	0	0	3	0
América Mineiro	Total		1	0	2	0	0	0	0	0	3	0
Novo Hamburgo	2014	Campeonato Gaúcho	6	1	0	0	0	0	0	0	6	1
Novo Hamburgo	Total		6	1	0	0	0	0	0	0	6	1
Brusque	2014	Campeonato Catarinense	5	1	0	0	0	0	0	0	5	1
Brusque	Total		5	1	0	0	0	0	0	0	5	1
Tombense	2014	Campeonato Brasileiro Série D	11	0	0	0	0	0	0	0	11	0
Tombense	2015	Campeonato Mineiro	8	0	0	0	0	0	0	0	8	0
Tombense	2015	Campeonato Brasileiro Série C	3	0	0	0	0	0	0	0	3	0
Tombense	Total		22	0	0	0	0	0	0	0	22	0
Metropolitano (loan)	2015	Campeonato Brasileiro Série D	5	2	0	0	0	0	0	0	5	2
Metropolitano (loan)	Total		5	2	0	0	0	0	0	0	5	2
Novo Hamburgo (loan)	2016	Campeonato Gaúcho	7	0	0	0	0	0	0	0	7	0
Novo Hamburgo (loan)	Total		7	.	0	0	0	0	0	0	7	0
Brusque	2017	Campeonato Brasileiro Série D	4	0	0	0	0	0	0	0	4	0
Brusque	Total		4	0	0	0	0	0	0	0	4	0
Metropolitano	2017	Campeonato Catarinense	16	2	0	0	0	0	0	0	16	2
Metropolitano	Total		16	2	0	0	0	0	0	0	16	2
Perseru Serui	2018	Liga 1	12	3	0	0	0	0	0	0	12	3
Perseru Serui	Total		12	3	0	0	0	0	0	0	12	3
Botafogo (Paraíba)	2018	Campeonato Brasileiro Série C	8	1	0	0	0	0	4 (Note: Appearances in the Copa Norte)	0	12	1
Botafogo (Paraíba)	Total		8	1	0	0	0	0	4	0	12	1
Caldense	2019	Campeonato Mineiro	2	0	0	0	0	0	0	0	2	0
Caldense	Total		2	0	0	0	0	0	0	0	2	0
Career total			102	10	2	0	0	0	4	0	108	10
