= João Victor (footballer, born 1984) =

Brazilian footballer

Personal information
- Full name: João Victor Severino
- Date of birth: 13 February 1984 (age 42)
- Place of birth: Bebedouro, Brazil
- Height: 1.77 m (5 ft 10 in)
- Position: Left-back

Team information
- Current team: Remo

Youth career
- 1999–2002: Cruzeiro

Senior career*
Years	Team	Apps	(Gls)
2002–2010	Cruzeiro	1	(0)
2003	→ Iguaçu-PR (Loan)		
2004	→ Cabofriense (Loan)		
2004	→ Valério-ES (Loan)		
2005	→ Uberlândia (Loan)		
2006	→ Cabofriense (Loan)		
2006	→ Paysandu (Loan)		
2007–2008	→ São Caetano (Loan)		
2008–2009	→ Marília (Loan)		
2010	→ Democrata (Loan)		
2010	Arapiraquense	9	(1)
2011	Botafogo-SP		
2011	Fortaleza	5	(1)
2011–2012	Criciúma	8	(0)
2012	Ipatinga	16	(0)
2013–2015	CRB		
2016–	Remo		
- * Club domestic league appearances and goals

João Victor Severino (born 13 February 1984), or simply João Victor, is a Brazilian footballer who plays as a left-back. As of August 2019, he played for Remo.
