= Ítalo (footballer, born 1989) =

Brazilian footballer

Personal information
- Full name: Ítalo Anderson Duarte de Santana
- Date of birth: 22 February 1989 (age 37)
- Place of birth: Maceió, Brazil
- Height: 1.82 m (6 ft 0 in)
- Position: Defender

Team information
- Current team: Treze

Senior career*
Years	Team	Apps	(Gls)
2009–2012	CRB		
2013	Central		
2014	Operário Ferroviário		
2014	Campinense		
2015	Maringá		
2015	Londrina		
2016	Remo		
2017–	Treze		
- * Club domestic league appearances and goals as of 20 January 2017

Ítalo Anderson Duarte de Santana (born February 22, 1989, in Maceió), simply known as Ítalo, is a Brazilian footballer who plays as defender for Treze.

== Career statistics ==
As of 20 January 2017

Club	Season	League			State League		Cup		Conmebol		Other		Total	
Club	Season	Division	Apps	Goals	Apps	Goals	Apps	Goals	Apps	Goals	Apps	Goals	Apps	Goals
CRB	2010	Série C	2	0	17	1	—		—		—		19	1
CRB	2011	Série C	1	0	14	2	—		—		—		15	2
CRB	2012	Série B	6	0	12	0	—		—		—		18	0
CRB	Subtotal		9	0	43	3	—		—		—		52	3
Central	2013	Série D	10	0	24	2	—		—		—		34	2
Operário Ferroviário	2014	Paranaense	—		3	0	—		—		—		3	0
Campinense	2014	Série D	8	0	—		—		—		—		8	0
Maringá	2015	Paranaense	—		10	0	4	0	—		—		14	0
Londrina	2015	Série C	13	0	—		—		—		—		13	0
Remo	2016	Série C	6	0	9	0	1	0	—		5	0	21	0
Treze	2017	Paraibano	—		0	0	—		—		—		0	0
Career total			46	0	89	5	5	0	0	0	5	0	145	5
