= São Jorge d'Oeste =

Coordinates: 25.7058°S 52.9178°W

- Municipality
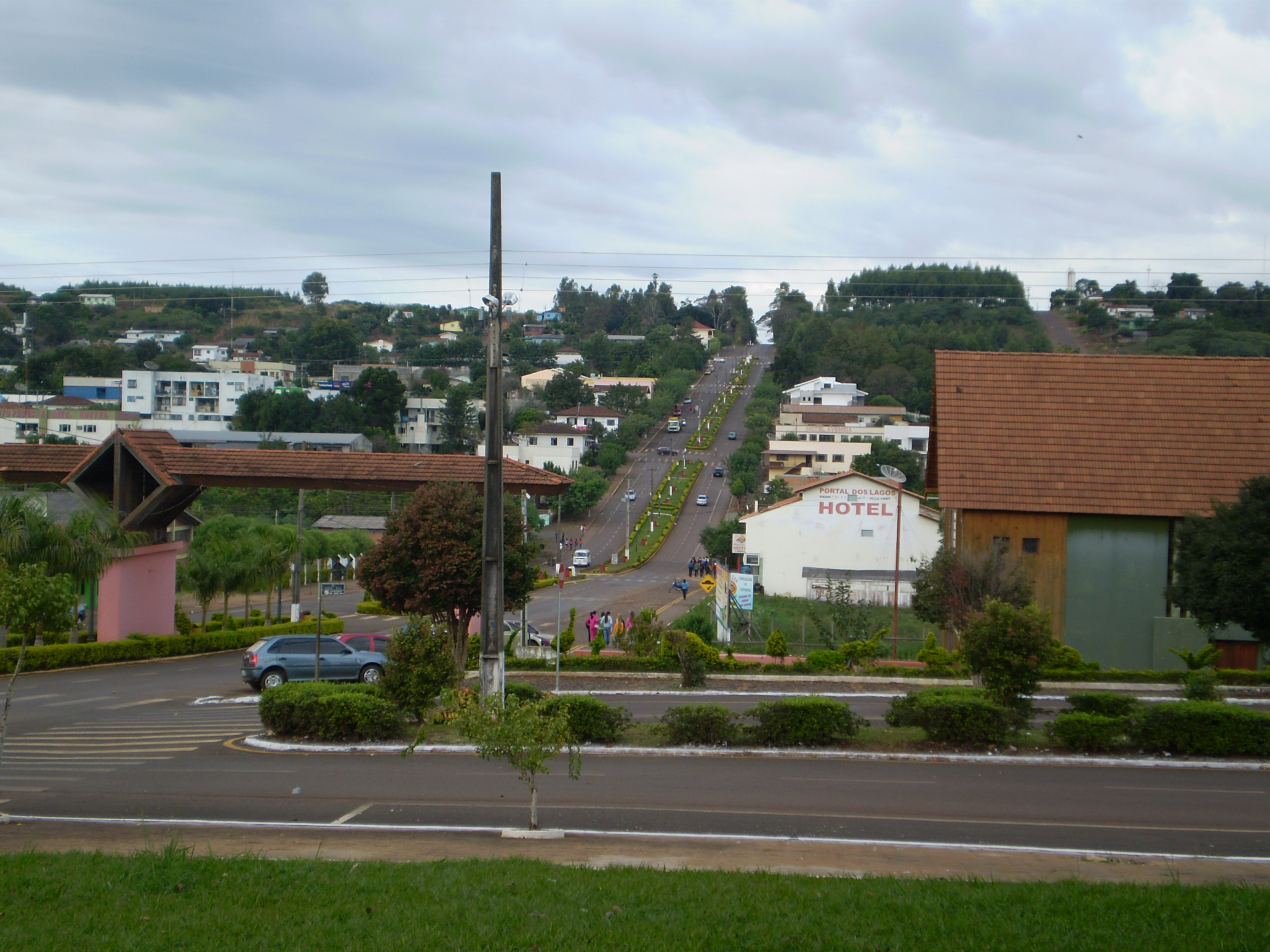

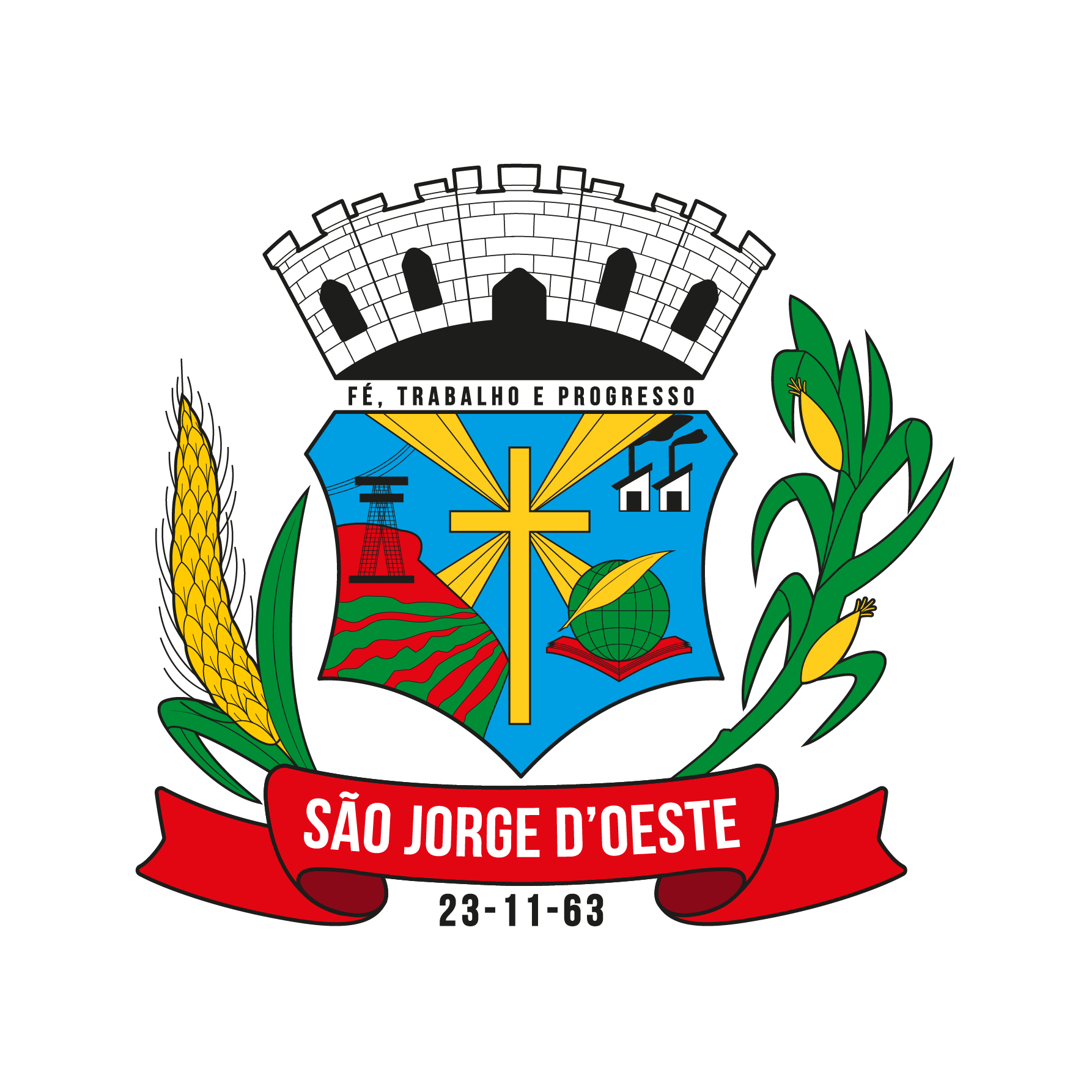
- Flag Coat of arms
- Interactive map of São Jorge d'Oeste
- Country: Brazil
- Region: Southern
- State: Paraná
- Mesoregion: Sudoeste Paranaense

Population (2020)
  - Total: 9,028
- Time zone: UTC−3 (BRT)

São Jorge d'Oeste is a municipality in the state of Paraná in the Southern Region of Brazil.

== See also ==
- List of municipalities in Paraná
