= Rodrigo Fumaça =

Brazilian footballer (born 1995)

Personal information
- Full name: Rodrigo Nascimento de Oliveira Luz
- Date of birth: 6 March 1995 (age 31)
- Place of birth: Rio de Janeiro, Brazil
- Height: 1.72 m (5 ft 8 in)
- Position: Forward

Team information
- Current team: campinense Futebol Clube

Youth career
- –2009: Flamengo
- 2010: Audax
- 2011: Vitória
- 2012: Vasco da Gama
- 2013–2014: Boavista
- 2015: Macaé

Senior career*
Years	Team	Apps	(Gls)
2015	Macaé	2	(0)
2015	Gonçalense		
2016	Itaboraí	16	(1)
2016	Sampaio Corrêa-RJ	0	(0)
2017	Luverdense	2	(0)
2018–2019	Sampaio Corrêa	10	(1)
2019	→ Cuiabá (loan)	6	(0)
2019	Ituano	0	(0)
2019–2020	Roeselare	7	(0)
2020	Macaé	2	(0)
2020	Manaus	14	(1)
2020–2021	Brasiliense	10	(1)
2021–	ABC	4	(0)
- * Club domestic league appearances and goals as of 20:41, 20 July 2021 (UTC)

Rodrigo Nascimento de Oliveira Luz (born 6 March 1995), commonly known as Rodrigo Fumaça, is a Brazilian footballer who currently plays as a forward for ABC.

== Career statistics ==
=== Club ===
As of 1 February 2020.

Club	Season	League			State League		Cup		Continental		Other		Total	
Club	Season	Division	Apps	Goals	Apps	Goals	Apps	Goals	Apps	Goals	Apps	Goals	Apps	Goals
Macaé	2015	Série B	0	0	2 (Note: Appearances in the Campeonato Carioca)	0	0	0	–		0	0	2	0
Itaboraí	2016	–			16 (Note: Appearances in the Campeonato Carioca 2ªD)	1	0	0	–		0	0	16	1
Sampaio Corrêa	2016	Série B	0	0	0	0	0	0	–		5 (Note: Appearances in the Copa Rio)	1	5	1
Luverdense	2017	Série B	2	0	0	0	3 (Note: Appearances in the Copa do Brasil)	0	–		5 (Note: Appearances in the Copa Verde)	0	10	0
Sampaio Corrêa (loan)	2018	Série B	5	1	5 (Note: Appearances in the Campeonato Maranhense)	0	3	0	–		10 (Note: Appearances in the Copa do Nordeste)	1	23	2
Sampaio Corrêa (loan)	2019	Série C	0	0	0	0	0	0	–		0	0	0	0
Sampaio Corrêa (loan)	Total		5	1	5	0	3	0	0	0	10	1	23	2
Cuiabá (loan)	2019	Série B	0	0	6 (Note: Appearances in the Campeonato Mato-Grossense)	0	0	0	–		0	0	6	0
Roeselare	2019–20	Proximus League	7	0	–		0	0	–		0	0	7	0
Macaé	2020	–			0	0	0	0	–		0	0	0	0
Career total			14	1	29	1	6	0	0	0	20	2	69	4
