= Raphael Macena =

Brazilian footballer (born 1989)

Personal information
- Full name: Raphael dos Santos Macena
- Date of birth: 25 February 1989 (age 37)
- Place of birth: Ipiaú, Bahia, Brazil
- Height: 1.84 m (6 ft 1/2 in)
- Position: Forward

Team information
- Current team: Inter de Santa Maria

Youth career
- Bahia

Senior career*
Years	Team	Apps	(Gls)
2007–2008	Votoraty		
2008	São Bento		
2009	Olé Brasil		
2009	União São João		
2010	Desportivo Brasil		
2010	Paulista		
2011	Grêmio Osasco	10	(4)
2012	Shonan Bellmare	2	(0)
2013	Comercial	22	(13)
2013	Ceará	8	(1)
2013	Guarani	6	(2)
2014	Comercial	2	(0)
2014	XV de Novembro	3	(0)
2014	Juventude	13	(2)
2015	Rio Claro	11	(6)
2015–2016	Kallithea	20	(4)
2016–2017	Luverdense	29	(1)
2017–2018	URT		
2019	Veranópolis		
2019–2020	XV de Piracicaba		
2020–2021	Chania	17	(1)
2021	Mirassol	17	(3)
2022	Resende	14	(3)
2022	Santa Cruz	16	(2)
2022	CEOV		
2023	Taubaté	15	(2)
2023–	Inter de Santa Maria		
- * Club domestic league appearances and goals as of 11 March 2023

Raphael dos Santos Macena (born 25 February 1989) is a Brazilian professional footballer who plays as a forward for Inter de Santa Maria.

== Club statistics ==
Club performance			League		Cup		Total	
Season	Club	League	Apps	Goals	Apps	Goals	Apps	Goals
Japan			League		Emperor's Cup		Total	
2012	Shonan Bellmare	J2 League	2	0	0	0	2	0
Country	Japan		2	0	0	0	2	0
Total			2	0	0	0	2	0
