= Jailson (footballer, born 1992) =

Brazilian footballer

Personal information
- Full name: Edjailson Nascimento da Silva
- Date of birth: 9 October 1992 (age 34)
- Place of birth: Palmares, Brazil
- Height: 1.82 m (6 ft 0 in)
- Position: Attacking midfielder

Team information
- Current team: ASA

Senior career*
Years	Team	Apps	(Gls)
2013–2016	Pesqueira	4	(0)
2016–2017	Santa Rita	13	(1)
2016	→ ASA (loan)	0	(0)
2017	Central	6	(1)
2017–2018	Moto Club	?	(2)
2018	Fluminense de Feira	8	(7)
2018–2019	Santa Rita	13	(3)
2019	→ Cuiabá (loan)	0	(0)
2019–2020	ABC	24	(13)
2020–2021	Al-Tai	19	(7)
2021	→ Najran (loan)	18	(2)
2021	Náutico	9	(0)
2022	Brusque	44	(0)
2023	ABC	10	(1)
2023	Botafogo-PB	17	(1)
2024	Capital	8	(2)
2024	CRAC	15	(0)
2025–	ASA	45	(4)
- * Club domestic league appearances and goals as of 19 November 2026

Edjailson Nascimento da Silva (born 9 October 1992), commonly known as Jailson, is a Brazilian footballer who plays as an attacking midfielder for ASA.
