= Luiz Otávio (footballer, born 1997) =

Brazilian footballer

Personal information
- Full name: Luiz Otávio Alves Marcolino
- Date of birth: 18 March 1997 (age 29)
- Place of birth: Curitiba, Brazil
- Height: 1.74 m (5 ft 9 in)
- Position: Midfielder

Team information
- Current team: Cuiabá
- Number: 97

Senior career*
Years	Team	Apps	(Gls)
2017	Paranaense	12	(0)
2017–2019	Paraná	54	(1)
2018	→ Santa Cruz (loan)	18	(1)
2018	→ CRB (loan)	12	(1)
2020–2023	Tombense	14	(0)
2020–2021	→ Botafogo (loan)	31	(0)
2022	→ Barra-SC (loan)	9	(0)
2022	→ Confiança-SE (loan)	10	(0)
2022	→ Hercílio Luz (loan)	0	(0)
2023	→ Confiança-SE (loan)	5	(0)
2023	→ Sampaio Corrêa (loan)	16	(0)
2024	Azuriz	12	(0)
2024–2025	Confiança	43	(3)
2026	Velo Clube	8	(1)
2026–	Cuiabá	16	(0)
- * Club domestic league appearances and goals as of 18 November 2026

Luiz Otávio Alves Marcolino (born 18 March 1997), known as Luiz Otávio, is a Brazilian professional footballer who plays as a midfielder for Cuiabá.

== Career ==
Luiz Otávio made his professional debut with Botafogo in a 1–1 Campeonato Paranaense tie with Rio Branco on 26 January 2017.

== Career statistics ==
As of match played 13 January 2025

Appearances and goals by club, season and competition
Club	Season	League			State league		Copa do Brasil		Continental		Other		Total	
Club	Season	Division	Apps	Goals	Apps	Goals	Apps	Goals	Apps	Goals	Apps	Goals	Apps	Goals
Paraná	2016	Série B	0	0	0	0	0	0	—		—		0	0
Paranaense	2017	Série A	0	0	11	0	0	0	1 (Note: Appearance(s) in Copa Libertadores)	0	—		12	0
Paraná	2017	Série B	9	0	0	0	0	0	—		0	0	9	0
Paraná	2018	Série A	0	0	0	0	0	0	—		—		0	0
Paraná	2019	Série B	37	1	6 (Note: Appearance(s) in Campeonato Paranaense)	0	2	0	—		—		45	1
Paraná	Total		46	1	6	0	2	0	0	0	0	0	54	1
Santa Cruz (loan)	2018	Série C	4	0	7 (Note: Appearance(s) in Campeonato Pernambucano)	1	1	0	—		6 (Note: Appearance(s) in Copa do Nordeste)	0	18	1
CRB (loan)	2018	Série B	12	1	0	0	0	0	—		0	0	12	1
Tombense	2020	Série C	0	0	0	0	—		—		0	0	0	0
Tombense	2021	Série C	14	0	0	0	0	0	—		0	0	14	0
Tombense	2022	Série B	0	0	0	0	0	0	—		—		0	0
Tombense	2023	Série B	0	0	0	0	0	0	—		—		0	0
Tombense	Total		14	0	0	0	0	0	0	0	0	0	14	0
Botafogo (loan)	2020	Série A	19	0	3 (Note: Appearance(s) in Campeonato Carioca)	0	2	0	—		—		24	0
Botafogo (loan)	2021	Série B	0	0	5	0	2	0	—		—		7	0
Botafogo (loan)	Total		19	0	8	0	4	0	0	0	0	0	31	0
Barra-SC (loan)	2022	—			9 (Note: Appearance(s) in Campeonato Catarinense)	0	—		—		—		9	0
Confiança-SE (loan)	2022	Série C	10	0	0	0	—		—		0	0	10	0
Confiança-SE (loan)	2023	Série C	0	0	5 (Note: Appearance(s) in Campeonato Sergipano)	0	—		—		2	0	7	0
Confiança-SE (loan)	Total		10	0	5	0	0	0	0	0	2	0	17	0
Sampaio Corrêa (loan)	2023	Série B	14	0	0	0	1	0	—		3	0	18	0
Azuriz	2024	—			12	0	—		—		—		12	0
Confiança-SE	2024	Série C	14	0	0	0	0	0	—		—		14	0
Confiança-SE	2025	Série C	0	0	—	1	0	0	—		0	0	—	1
Confiança-SE	Total		14	0	—	1	0	0	0	0	0	0	14+	1
Career total			133	2	58+	2	8	0	1	0	11	0	211+	4
