= Erik (footballer, born 1995) =

Brazilian footballer

Personal information
- Full name: Erik Roberto Silva do Nascimento
- Date of birth: 2 February 1995 (age 31)
- Place of birth: Três Rios, Brazil
- Height: 1.71 m (5 ft 7 in)
- Position: Forward

Youth career
- 2009–2011: Juventude
- 2012–2014: Grêmio

Senior career*
Years	Team	Apps	(Gls)
2014–2016	Grêmio	3	(0)
2015	→ Veranópolis (loan)	7	(2)
2015	→ Juventude (loan)	7	(0)
2016	→ Lajeadense (loan)	14	(4)
2016	→ Luverdense (loan)	13	(0)
2017	Luverdense	31	(3)
2018	Guarani	32	(5)
2019–2021	Desportivo Aves	2	(0)
2020–2021	→ CRB (loan)	22	(3)
2021–2022	Vitória	5	(0)
2022	Cianorte	5	(0)
2022	Luverdense		
2022–2023	Portuguesa Santista	11	(0)
2023	Hercílio Luz	8	(1)
- * Club domestic league appearances and goals as of 5 August 2023

Erik Roberto Silva do Nascimento (born 2 February 1995), or simply Erik, is a Brazilian professional footballer who plays as a forward.

== Career statistics ==
As of 24 December 2014

Appearances and goals by club, season and competition
Club	Season	League			National cup		Continental		Other		Total	
Club	Season	Division	Apps	Goals	Apps	Goals	Apps	Goals	Apps	Goals	Apps	Goals
Grêmio	2014	Série A	3	0	0	0	0	0	0	0	3	0
Grêmio	Total		3	0	0	0	0	0	0	0	3	0
Grêmio	Career total		3	0	0	0	0	0	0	0	3	0

== Honours ==
Luverdense

- Copa Verde: 2017
