= Douglas Borges =

Brazilian footballer (born 1990)

Personal information
- Full name: Douglas Borges
- Date of birth: 30 March 1990 (age 36)
- Place of birth: Franca, Brazil
- Height: 1.86 m (6 ft 1 in)
- Position: Goalkeeper

Team information
- Current team: Portuguesa
- Number: 1

Youth career
- 2002–2005: Sãocarlense
- 2005–2009: Cruzeiro

Senior career*
Years	Team	Apps	(Gls)
2009–2013	Cruzeiro	0	(0)
2010	→ Itaúna (loan)		
2011	→ Guarani-MG (loan)	0	(0)
2011	→ Monte Azul (loan)	0	(0)
2011	→ Tupi (loan)	0	(0)
2012	→ Volta Redonda (loan)	15	(0)
2012	→ Tupi (loan)	0	(0)
2013	→ Volta Redonda (loan)	0	(0)
2013	→ Tupi (loan)	3	(0)
2014	Tupi	0	(0)
2014	Olímpia	0	(0)
2014–2021	Volta Redonda	120	(0)
2015	→ Ceará (loan)	0	(0)
2016	→ Remo (loan)	3	(0)
2020–2021	→ CRB (loan)	3	(0)
2021–2023	Botafogo	28	(0)
2023–2025	Guarani	14	(0)
2025	Náutico	2	(0)
2025–	Portuguesa	6	(0)
- * Club domestic league appearances and goals as of 20 September 2025

Douglas Borges (born 30 March 1990) is a Brazilian footballer who plays as a goalkeeper for Portuguesa.

== Club career ==
Born in Franca, São Paulo, Douglas Borges began his career with Sãocarlense before joining Cruzeiro's youth setup at the age of 15. After finishing his formation, he went on a series of loans to Itaúna, Guarani-MG, Monte Azul, Tupi and Volta Redonda.

Douglas Borges signed a permanent deal with Tupi on 27 November 2013, but moved to Olímpia the following 8 June. He then returned to Volta Redonda, where he became a starter.

On 18 August 2015, Douglas Borges moved to Ceará until the end of the year. He signed for Remo in the following January, and returned to his parent club in October 2016.

On 3 December 2020, Douglas Borges moved to CRB on loan for the remainder of the 2020 Série B. He terminated his contract with Voltaço on 10 February 2021, and was announced at Novorizontino on the same day. Fourteen days later, however, he left the latter club after receiving an "irrefutable offer", and signed for Botafogo on 4 March.

A backup to Diego Loureiro during his first season as regular starter Gatito Fernández was injured, Douglas Borges appeared in ten league matches as Fogão achieved promotion to the Série A. He then became Fernández's backup in 2022, and made his top tier debut on 17 July of that year, starting in a 1–0 home loss to Atlético Mineiro.

== Career statistics ==
As of 21 March 2023

Club	Season	League			State League		Cup		Continental		Other		Total	
Club	Season	Division	Apps	Goals	Apps	Goals	Apps	Goals	Apps	Goals	Apps	Goals	Apps	Goals
Cruzeiro	2009	Série A	0	0	0	0	0	0	—		—		0	0
Guarani-MG (loan)	2011	Mineiro	—		0	0	—		—		—		0	0
Monte Azul (loan)	2011	Paulista A2	—		0	0	—		—		—		0	0
Tupi (loan)	2011	Série D	0	0	—		—		—		—		0	0
Volta Redonda (loan)	2012	Série D	0	0	15	0	—		—		—		15	0
Tupi (loan)	2012	Série C	1	0	—		—		—		—		1	0
Volta Redonda (loan)	2013	Carioca	—		0	0	0	0	—		—		0	0
Tupi (loan)	2013	Série D	3	0	—		—		—		—		3	0
Tupi	2014	Série C	0	0	0	0	0	0	—		—		0	0
Olímpia	2014	Paulista 2ª Divisão	—		0	0	—		—		—		0	0
Volta Redonda	2014	Carioca	—		0	0	—		—		13 (Note: Appearance(s) in Copa Rio)	0	13	0
Volta Redonda	2015	Série D	4	0	15	0	—		—		—		19	0
Volta Redonda	2017	Série C	0	0	14	0	1	0	—		—		15	0
Volta Redonda	2018	Série C	18	0	11	0	—		—		1	0	30	0
Volta Redonda	2019	Série C	18	0	11	0	—		—		—		29	0
Volta Redonda	2020	Série C	16	0	13	0	1	0	—		—		30	0
Volta Redonda	Subtotal		56	0	64	0	2	0	—		14	0	136	0
Ceará (loan)	2015	Série B	0	0	—		—		—		—		0	0
Remo (loan)	2016	Série C	1	0	2	0	0	0	—		0	0	3	0
CRB (loan)	2020	Série B	3	0	—		—		—		—		3	0
Botafogo	2021	Série B	10	0	14	0	2	0	—		—		26	0
Botafogo	2022	Série A	1	0	1	0	1	0	—		—		3	0
Botafogo	2023	Série A	0	0	2	0	0	0	0	0	—		2	0
Botafogo	Subtotal		11	0	17	0	3	0	0	0	—		31	0
Career total			75	0	98	0	5	0	0	0	14	0	192	0

== Honours ==
Tupi

- Campeonato Brasileiro Série D: 2011

Botafogo

- Campeonato Brasileiro Série B: 2021
