= Michel Guerreiro =

Brazilian footballer

Personal information
- Full name: Michel Miguel da Silva
- Date of birth: 8 June 1981 (age 45)
- Place of birth: São Paulo, Brazil
- Height: 1.78 m (5 ft 10 in)
- Position: Defensive midfielder

Senior career*
Years	Team	Apps	(Gls)
2005	Boca Júnior		
2006	Confiança		
2006–2008	Sport Recife		
2006	→ Ceará (loan)	0	(0)
2007–2008	→ Ceará (loan)	68	(0)
2009–2011	Ceará	152	(7)
2012–2013	Vitória	87	(4)
2014–2015	Ceará	25	(0)
2016	Remo	9	(0)
2017	Tiradentes-CE	9	(1)
2017–2018	Iguatu	12	(0)
2017	→ Guarany de Sobral (loan)	8	(1)
2018	Salgueiro	15	(0)
2018–2019	Iguatu	6	(0)
2019–2020	Pacajus	7	(1)
2020	Tiradentes-CE	5	(0)

Managerial career
- 2021: Pacajus (assistant)
- 2022: Pacajus
- * Club domestic league appearances and goals

Michel Miguel da Silva (born 8 June 1981 in São Paulo), known as Michel Guerreiro or simply Michel, is a Brazilian football manager and former player who played as defensive midfielder.
