= Luiz Carlos (footballer, born August 1980) =

Brazilian footballer (born 1980)

Personal information
- Full name: Luiz Carlos de Souza Pinto Junior
- Date of birth: August 31, 1980 (age 46)
- Place of birth: Rio de Janeiro, Brazil
- Position: Forward

Team information
- Current team: Guarany de Sobral

Senior career*
Years	Team	Apps	(Gls)
2000	CFZ do Rio		
2001–2002	Bangu		
2002	CFZ do Rio		
2003	Sol de América		
2003–2004	Al Shabab		
2004	Coritiba		
2005	Paysandu		
2005–2006	UE Lleida	7	(0)
2006	Vasco da Gama		
2007	Cabofriense		
2007–2008	Viborg FF	5	(2)
2008–2012	Internacional		
2008	→ Ceará (loan)	?	(12)
2009	→ Itumbiara (loan)		
2009	→ Fortaleza (loan)	27	(13)
2010	→ Portuguesa (loan)	4	(2)
2011	→ Novo Hamburgo (loan)		
2011	→ Brasil de Pelotas (loan)	5	(0)
2012	→ Brasiliense (loan)	4	(0)
2013–	Guarany de Sobral		
- * Club domestic league appearances and goals as of 16 March 2013

Luiz Carlos de Souza Pinto Junior or just Luiz Carlos (born 31 August 1980) is a Brazilian professional football forward.

Luiz Carlos played for Danish Superliga side Viborg FF in 2007. He currently plays for Brazilian Serie A side Internacional.
