= Fernando Henrique (footballer, born 1983) =

Brazilian footballer

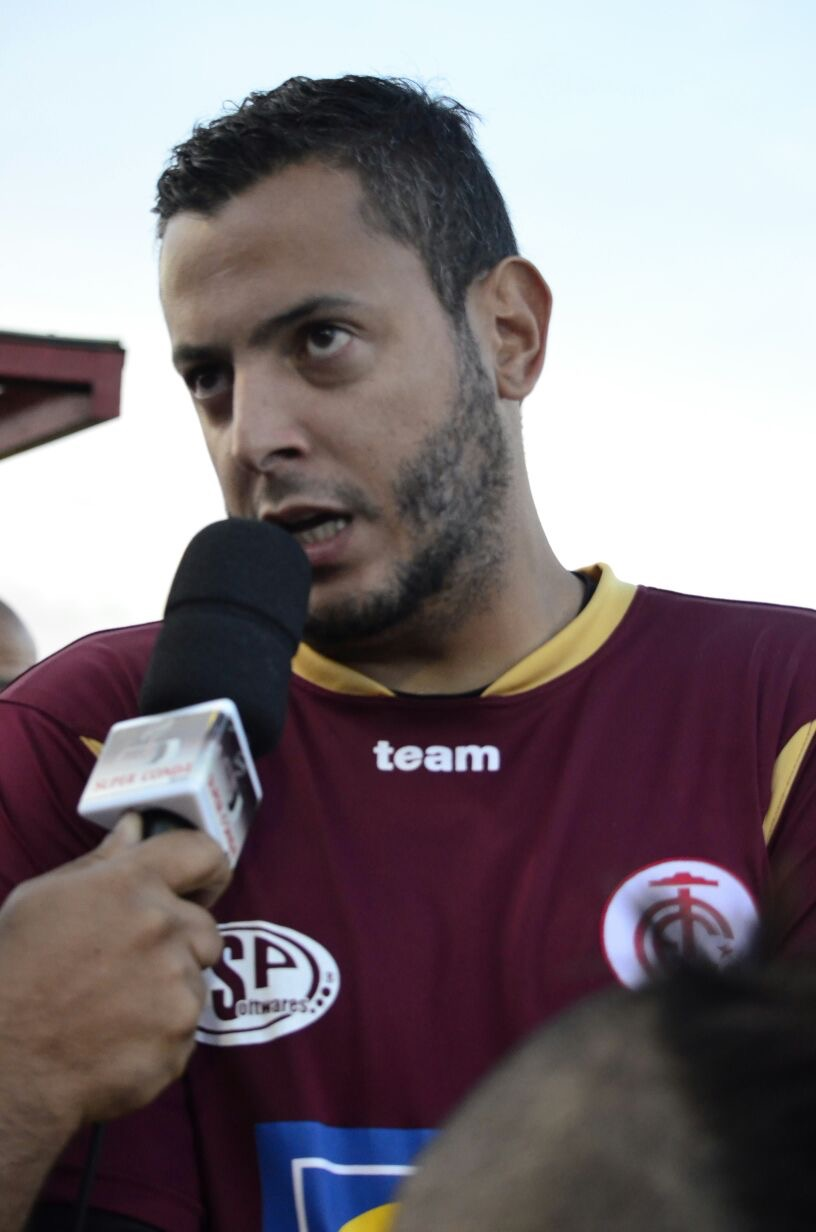

Personal information
- Full name: Fernando Henrique dos Anjos
- Date of birth: 25 November 1983 (age 42)
- Place of birth: Bauru, Brazil
- Height: 1.90 m (6 ft 3 in)
- Position: Goalkeeper

Team information
- Current team: Rio Branco Atlético Clube
- Number: 1

Youth career
- 1997–1998: Santos
- 1998–2003: Fluminense

Senior career*
Years	Team	Apps	(Gls)
2002–2010	Fluminense	221	(0)
2011–2013	Ceará	143	(0)
2014	América de Natal	20	(0)
2015	Inter de Lages	17	(0)
2015–2016	Remo	38	(0)
2017	Villa Nova	10	(0)
2017–2019	Ceará	8	(0)
2019	CRB	7	(0)
2020	Santo André	10	(0)
2020	Brasiliense	18	(0)
2021	Santo André	13	(0)
2021–2022	Oeste	25	(0)
2023	Portuguesa	0	(0)
2024	XV de Piracicaba	0	(0)
2024	Mixto	15	(0)
2025	Noroeste	0	(0)
2025–	Rio Branco Atlético Clube	0	(0)

International career
2003	Brazil U20		
2004	Brazil	1	(0)
- * Club domestic league appearances and goals as of 04:38, 9 December 2022 (UTC)

Fernando Henrique dos Anjos (born 25 November 1983), known as Fernando Henrique, is a Brazilian footballer who plays as a goalkeeper for Rio Branco Atlético Clube.

Fernando Henrique notably represented Fluminense, spending nine full campaigns in the first team and being a regular starter in the vast majority of his spell.

== International career ==
Fernando Henrique has also been capped at under-20 level for Brazil, and made his first full appearance for senior side in 6–0 win over Haiti in Port-au-Prince on 18 August 2004, as a second-half substitute for Júlio César.

== Career statistics ==
As of 4 August 2023.

Club	Season	League			State League		Cup		Continental		Other		Total	
Club	Season	Division	Apps	Goals	Apps	Goals	Apps	Goals	Apps	Goals	Apps	Goals	Apps	Goals
Fluminense	2002	Série A	0	0	2	0	0	0	—		—		2	0
Fluminense	2003	Série A	8	0	0	0	1	0	—		—		9	0
Fluminense	2004	Série A	40	0	10	0	1	0	—		—		51	0
Fluminense	2005	Série A	0	0	4	0	0	0	—		—		4	0
Fluminense	2006	Série A	22	0	5	0	9	0	1 (Note: Appearance(s) in Copa Sudamericana)	0	—		37	0
Fluminense	2007	Série A	32	0	6	0	10	0	—		—		48	0
Fluminense	2008	Série A	32	0	12	0	—		14 (Note: Appearance(s) in Copa Libertadores)	0	—		58	0
Fluminense	2009	Série A	11	0	14	0	8	0	—		—		33	0
Fluminense	2010	Série A	17	0	0	0	0	0	—		—		17	0
Fluminense	Total		162	0	59	0	29	0	15	0	—		265	0
Ceará	2011	Série A	23	0	20	0	9	0	—		—		52	0
Ceará	2012	Série B	23	0	24	0	3	0	—		—		50	0
Ceará	2013	Série B	35	0	18	0	3	0	—		10 (Note: Appearance(s) in Copa do Nordeste.)	0	66	0
Ceará	Total		81	0	62	0	15	0	—		10	0	168	0
América de Natal	2014	Série B	17	0	3	0	4	0	—		—		24	0
Inter de Lages	2015	Série D	0	0	17	0	—		—		—		17	0
Remo	2015	Série D	14	0	—		—		—		—		14	0
Remo	2016	Série C	17	0	7	0	2	0	—		6 (Note: Appearance(s) in Copa Verde.)	0	32	0
Remo	Total		31	0	7	0	2	0	—		6	0	46	0
Villa Nova	2017	Série D	0	0	10	0	—		—		—		10	0
Ceará	2017	Série B	1	0	—		—		—		4 (Note: Appearance(s) in Copa Fares Lopes.)	0	5	0
Ceará	2018	Série A	0	0	2	0	0	0	—		1	0	3	0
Ceará	2019	Série A	0	0	5	0	1	0	—		2 (Note: One appearance in Copa dos Campeões Cearenses, one appearance in Copa do Nordeste.)	0	8	0
Ceará	Total		1	0	7	0	1	0	—		7	0	16	0
CRB	2019	Série B	7	0	—		—		—		—		7	0
Santo André	2020	Paulista	—		10	0	2	0	—		—		12	0
Brasiliense	2020	Série D	18	0	—		—		—		—		18	0
Santo André	2021	Série D	0	0	13	0	—		—		—		13	0
Oeste	2021	Série C	6	0	—		—		—		—		6	0
Oeste	2022	Série D	6	0	13	0	1	0	—		6 (Note: Appearance(s) in Copa Paulista.)	0	26	0
Oeste	Total		12	0	13	0	1	0	—		6	0	32	0
Portuguesa	2023	Paulista	—		0	0	—		—		2	0	2	0
XV de Piracicaba	2024	Paulista A2	—		0	0	—		—		17	0	17	0
Mixto	2024	Série D	15	0	—		—		—		2	0	17	0
Noroeste	2025	Paulista	—		0	0	—		—		0	0	0	0
Career total			344	0	201	0	54	0	15	0	50	0	664	0

== Honours ==
=== Club ===
Fluminense

- Taça Rio: 2005
- Campeonato Carioca: 2005
- Copa do Brasil: 2007
- Campeonato Brasileiro Série A: 2010

Ceará

- Campeonato Cearense: 2011, 2012, 2013, 2018

América de Natal

- Campeonato Potiguar: 2014

=== International ===
Brazil U20

- FIFA U-20 World Cup: 2003
