= Geovani (footballer, born 1993) =

Brazilian footballer

Personal information
- Full name: Geovani Cortes Gomes
- Date of birth: 23 January 1993 (age 33)
- Place of birth: Rio de Janeiro, Brazil
- Height: 1.76 m (5 ft 9 in)
- Position: Midfielder

Youth career
- –2009: Sporting CP
- 2009: Hamburger SV
- 2009–2010: Schalke 04
- 2010–2011: Hertha BSC
- 2012: Botafogo
- 2018: Santa Cruz

Senior career*
Years	Team	Apps	(Gls)
2013	Ceres		
2014	Bangu	0	(0)
2014	Bonsucesso	0	(0)
2015	Serra Talhada	7	(0)
2015–2016	Bonsucesso	0	(0)
2017	Americano	0	(0)
2018	Santa Cruz	7	(1)
2019–2020	Sagamihara	8	(0)
2021	Tepatitlán F.C.	5	(0)
- * Club domestic league appearances and goals as of 18:36, 28 ago 2021 (UTC)

Geovani Cortes Gomes (born 23 January 1993), commonly known as Geovani, is a Brazilian footballer who currently plays as a midfielder for Mexico ese Expansión Ligue MX side Tepatitlán F.C.

== Career statistics ==
=== Club ===
As of 13 June 2019.

Club	Season	League			State League		Cup		Continental		Other		Total	
Club	Season	Division	Apps	Goals	Apps	Goals	Apps	Goals	Apps	Goals	Apps	Goals	Apps	Goals
Bangu	2014	–			2 (Note: Appearances in the Campeonato Carioca)	0	0	0	–		0	0	2	0
Bonsucesso	2015	–			6	0	0	0	–		0	0	6	0
Serra Talhada	2015	Série D	7	0	0	0	0	0	–		0	0	7	0
Bonsucesso	2016	–			8	0	0	0	–		0	0	8	0
Bonsucesso	2017	–			8	0	0	0	–		0	0	8	0
Bonsucesso	Total		0	0	16	0	0	0	0	0	0	0	16	0
Americano	2017	–			15 (Note: Appearances in the Campeonato Carioca A2)	0	0	0	–		1 (Note: Appearances in the Copa Rio)	0	16	0
Santa Cruz	2018	Série C	7	1	4 (Note: Appearances in the Campeonato Pernambucano)	0	1 (Note: Appearances in the Copa do Brasil)	0	–		4 (Note: Appearances in the Copa do Nordeste)	0	16	1
Sagamihara	2019	J3 League	8	0	–		0	0	–		0	0	8	0
Career total			22	1	43	0	1	0	0	0	5	0	71	1
