= Patrick Leonardo =

Brazilian footballer

Personal information
- Full name: Patrick Leonardo Carneiro da Silva
- Date of birth: 23 August 1990 (age 36)
- Place of birth: Três Corações, Brazil
- Height: 1.81 m (5 ft 11 in)
- Position: Forward

Youth career
- –2010: Atlético Paranaense

Senior career*
Years	Team	Apps	(Gls)
2009–2011	Atlético Paranaense	19	(2)
2010	→ Orduspor (loan)	0	(0)
2011	→ Portimonense (loan)	8	(0)
2011	→ Fortaleza (loan)		
2012	Bragantino	1	(0)
2020	Than Quang Ninh	2	(0)
2020–2021	Hồ Chí Minh City	2	(1)
- * Club domestic league appearances and goals as of 16 May 2012

Patrick Leonardo Carneiro da Silva (born 23 August 1990) is a Brazilian professional footballer who plays as a forward for Serra.
