= Palmitos =

Coordinates: 27.0675°S 53.1611°W

- Municipality
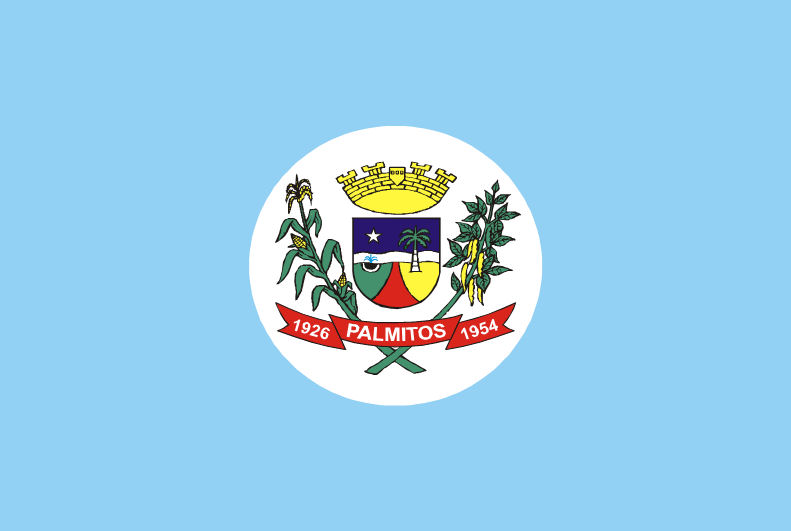
- Flag Coat of arms
- Interactive map of Palmitos
- Country: Brazil
- Region: South
- State: Santa Catarina
- Mesoregion: Oeste Catarinense

Population (2020)
  - Total: 16,157
- Time zone: UTC -3

Palmitos is a municipality in the state of Santa Catarina in the South region of Brazil.

== Schools ==
=== N.E.M Ida Hilda Casella Vidori ===
The Ida Hilda Casella Vidori Educational Center is located in the urban area, in the highway from Palmitos to St Lucia, in the neighborhood Nossa Senhora do Rosário, in the city of Palmitos, state of Santa Catarina. It was created by ordinance No. 007/99 by the Mayor Elmo Fiegenbaum. The Educational Center is maintained and administered by the Municipal Education Secretary of the City of Palmitos, SC, offering education from pre-school to elementary school. The Center serves children from 4 to 15 years old, coming from rural communities as: Pinhalzinho, Santa Catarina, Barra Grande, Caititu, Baixa Diamantina, Progresso, Caravagio e Floresta among others, and especially three districts: Progress, Nossa Senhora do Rosario and Aurora.

== See also ==
- List of municipalities in Santa Catarina
