= Murilo (footballer, born 1984) =

Brazilian footballer

Personal information
- Full name: Murilo Bedusco dos Santos
- Date of birth: January 5, 1984 (age 42)
- Place of birth: Curitiba, Brazil
- Height: 1.79 m (5 ft 10 in)
- Position: Right back

Team information
- Current team: Atlético-GO
- Number: 2

Youth career
- 2004: Atlético-PR

Senior career*
Years	Team	Apps	(Gls)
2005	→ Londrina (loan)		
2006	→ Bragantino-SP (loan)		
2006	→ J. Malucelli (loan)		
2006–2008	Atlético-PR		
2007	→ Rio Branco-PR (loan)		
2008	→ Toledo Colônia Work-PR (loan)		
2008–2010	Paraná	94	(7)
2011	Ceará	11	(1)
2011	Ponte Preta	2	(0)
2012	ABC	23	(4)
2013	Guaratinguetá	34	(1)
2014	Joinville	32	(0)
2015	Atlético-GO	16	(1)
2016	Remo	14	(2)
- * Club domestic league appearances and goals

Murilo Bedusco dos Santos or simply Murilo (born January 5, 1984, in Curitiba), is a Brazilian right back. He currently plays for Joinville.

== Contract ==
- Toledo Colônia Work-PR (Loan) 8 January 2008 to 30 April 2008
- Atlético-PR 1 August 2003 to 1 August 2008
