= Roniery =

Brazilian footballer

Personal information
- Full name: Roniery Ximenis Sousa Silva
- Date of birth: 23 November 1987 (age 38)
- Place of birth: São Luís, Brazil
- Height: 1.67 m (5 ft 6 in)
- Position: Right back

Team information
- Current team: Villa Nova

Senior career*
Years	Team	Apps	(Gls)
2008–2009	Imperatriz		
2009–2010	JV Lideral	6	(0)
2011	Fortaleza	0	(0)
2012–2013	Sampaio Corrêa	15	(1)
2013	→ Mogi Mirim (loan)	0	(0)
2013–2014	Paraná	24	(0)
2014	→ Bahia (loan)	17	(0)
2015	Botafogo SP	0	(0)
2015	Ceará	10	(0)
2016	Paysandu	19	(0)
2017	Sampaio Corrêa	8	(0)
2019	Botafogo PB	0	(0)
2020–	Villa Nova	0	(0)
- * Club domestic league appearances and goals as of 23:27, 20 June 2019 (UTC)

Roniery Ximenis Sousa Silva (born November 23, 1987, in São Luís), known as Roniery, is a Brazilian footballer who plays as right back for Villa Nova.

== Career ==
Roniery played for Botafogo Futebol Clube (SP) in the 2015 Campeonato Paulista but was sidelined by injuries and competition from regular right back Gimenez.

== Career statistics ==
As of 24 February 2017

Club	Season	League			State League		Cup		Conmebol		Other		Total	
Club	Season	Division	Apps	Goals	Apps	Goals	Apps	Goals	Apps	Goals	Apps	Goals	Apps	Goals
JV Lideral	2010	Série D	6	0	—		0	0	—		—		6	0
Fortaleza	2011	Série C	—		15	0	2	0	—		—		17	0
Sampaio Corrêa	2011	Série D	15	1	18	1	0	0	—		—		33	2
Mogi Mirim	2013	Série C	—		17	0	—		—		—		17	0
Paraná	2013	Série B	24	0	—		—		—		—		24	0
Paraná	2014	Série B	—		3	0	1	0	—		—		4	0
Paraná	Subtotal		24	0	3	0	1	0	—		—		28	0
Bahia	2014	Série A	17	0	—		—		2 (Note: All appearance(s) in Copa Sudamericana)	0	—		19	0
Botafogo–SP	2015	Série C	—		6	0	—		—		—		6	0
Ceará	2015	Série C	10	0	—		1	0	—		—		11	0
Paysandu	2016	Série B	19	0	7	0	5	0	—		8 (Note: All appearance(s) in Copa Verde)	0	39	0
Career total			91	1	66	1	9	0	2	0	8	0	176	2
