= Willian Simões =

Brazilian footballer

Personal information
- Full name: Willian Simões
- Date of birth: 6 March 1988 (age 38)
- Place of birth: Cachoeiro de Itapemirim, Brazil
- Height: 1.70 m (5 ft 7 in)
- Position: Left back

Team information
- Current team: Desportiva Ferroviária

Senior career*
Years	Team	Apps	(Gls)
2009	Colatinense		
2009	Vitória–ES		
2010–2011	Inter de Bebedouro	0	(0)
2012	Mirassol	0	(0)
2012	Criciúma	6	(0)
2013	Atlético Sorocaba	0	(0)
2013	Cachoeiro	0	(0)
2014	Comercial	0	(0)
2014–2015	Sampaio Corrêa	42	(2)
2016	Fortaleza	17	(0)
2017	Paysandu	0	(0)
2017	→ Cuiabá (loan)	6	(0)
2018	Mirassol	0	(0)
2019	FC Cascavel	0	(0)
2019	Maringá	5	(0)
2019–2020	Náutico	50	(0)
2021–2022	FC Cascavel	62	(1)
2022	→ Água Santa (loan)	4	(0)
2023	Marcílio Dias	4	(0)
2023	São Joseense	11	(0)
2024	Vitória-ES	11	(0)
2024–2025	Porto Vitória	42	(1)
2026–	Desportiva Ferroviária	8	(0)
- * Club domestic league appearances and goals as of 22:54, 20 June 2019 (UTC)

Willian Simões.(born March 6, 1988, in Cachoeiro de Itapemirim) is a Brazilian footballer who plays as left back.

== Career statistics ==
As of 27 January 2017

Club	Season	League			State League		Cup		Conmebol		Other		Total	
Club	Season	Division	Apps	Goals	Apps	Goals	Apps	Goals	Apps	Goals	Apps	Goals	Apps	Goals
Inter de Bebedouro	2010	Paulista B	—		18	0	—		—		—		18	0
Inter de Bebedouro	2011	Paulista A3	—		15	2	—		—		21 (Note: All appearance(s) in Copa Paulista)	3	36	5
Inter de Bebedouro	Subtotal		—		33	2	—		—		21	3	54	5
Mirassol	2012	Paulista	—		14	0	—		—		—		14	0
Criciúma	2012	Série B	6	0	—		—		—		—		6	0
Atlético Sorocaba	2013	Paulista	—		6	0	—		—		—		6	0
Cachoeiro	2013	Capixaba	—		—		—		—		9 (Note: All appearance(s) in Copa Espírito Santo)	1	9	1
Comercial	2014	Paulista	—		13	0	—		—		—		13	0
Sampaio Corrêa	2014	Série B	24	1	—		2	0	—		—		26	1
Sampaio Corrêa	2015	Série B	18	1	10	0	3	0	—		6 (Note: All appearance(s) in Copa do Nordeste)	0	37	1
Sampaio Corrêa	Subtotal		42	2	10	0	5	0	—		6	0	63	2
Fortaleza	2016	Série C	17	0	11	0	7	0	—		4	0	39	0
Career total			65	2	87	2	12	0	0	0	40	4	204	8
