= Leandro Cearense =

Brazilian footballer (born 1985)

Personal information
- Full name: Leandro de Oliveira Noronha
- Date of birth: April 22, 1985 (age 41)
- Place of birth: Castanhal, Brazil
- Height: 1.82 m (6 ft 0 in)
- Position: Forward

Team information
- Current team: Caeté

Senior career*
Years	Team	Apps	(Gls)
2010–2011	Cametá	-	(-)
2011	Vila Nova	23	(3)
2012	Cuiabá	3	(0)
2012	Santa Cruz de Cuiarana	-	(-)
2013–2014	Remo	48	(19)
2013	→ Nacional (loan)	3	(2)
2015–2017	Paysandu	101	(25)
2017	Fortaleza	15	(2)
2018	Água Santa	7	(1)
2018	Castanhal	0	(0)
2018	ABC	4	(0)
2019	Oman Club	0	(0)
2019	Novo Hamburgo	12	(1)
2019	Bragantino-PA	5	(1)
2019	Cametá	0	(0)
2020–	Villa Nova	0	(0)
- * Club domestic league appearances and goals as of 22:20, 11 March 2020 (UTC)

Leandro de Oliveira Noronha (born April 22, 1985), commonly known as Leandro Cearense, is a Brazilian professional footballer who plays as a forward for Caeté.

== Honours ==
=== Club ===
Remo

- Campeonato Paraense: 2014

Paysandu

- Campeonato Paraense: 2016, 2017
- Copa Verde: 2016

Tuna Luso

- Copa Grão Pará: 2024
