= Fernando Lombardi =

Brazilian footballer and coach (born 1982)

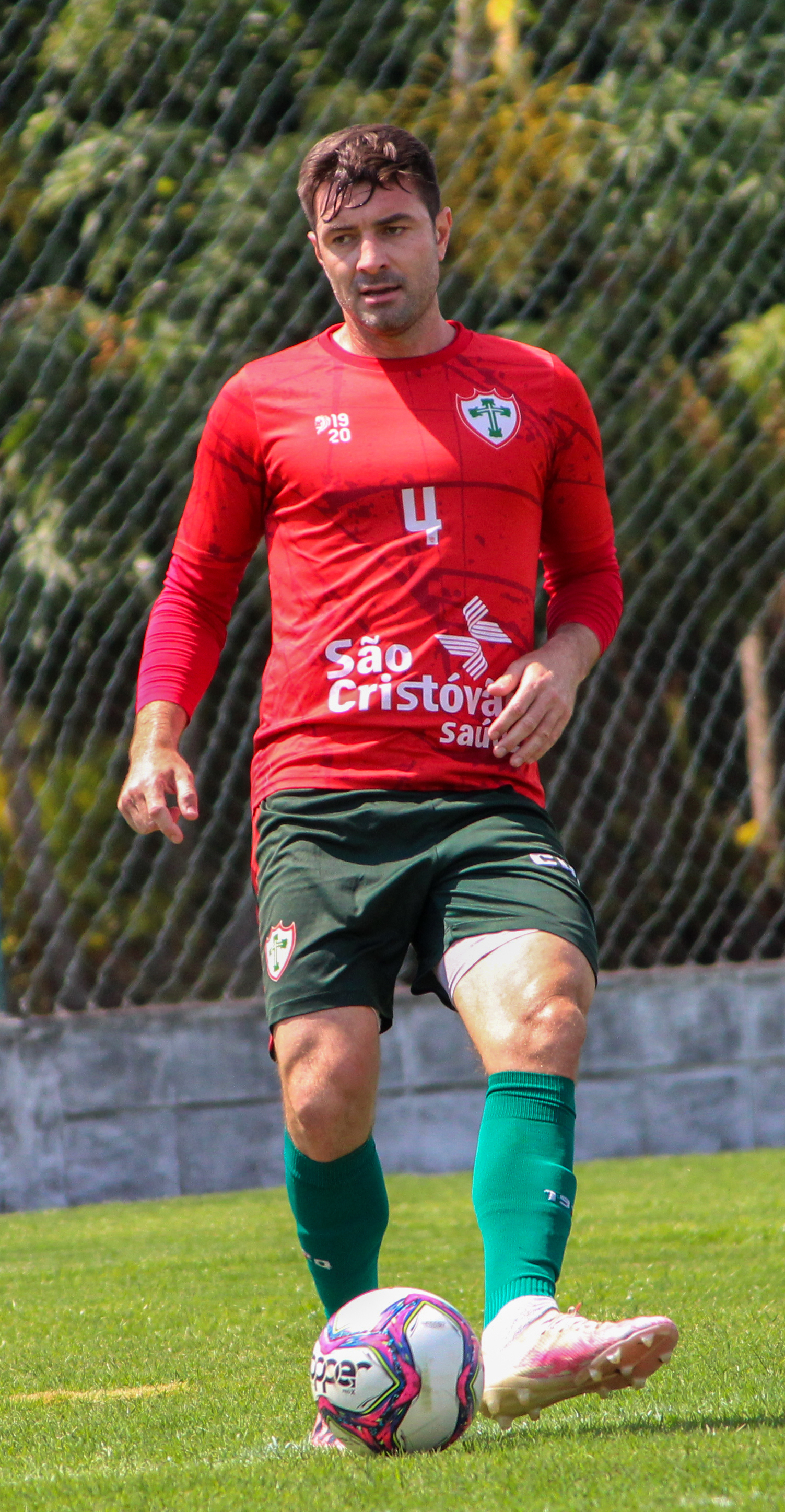
- Lombardi with Portuguesa in 2021

Personal information
- Full name: Fernando Lombardi
- Date of birth: 17 January 1982 (age 44)
- Place of birth: Curitiba, Brazil
- Height: 1.85 m (6 ft 1 in)
- Position: Centre-back

Youth career
- Paraná

Senior career*
Years	Team	Apps	(Gls)
2001–2006	Paraná		(1)
2005–2006	→ Levante (loan)	0	(0)
2006–2007	América de Natal		
2007	Ceará	18	(3)
2008	Rio Claro	9	(1)
2008	Caxias		
2009	Mogi Mirim	3	(0)
2009	Vila Nova	4	(0)
2010	Atlético Sorocaba	17	(0)
2011	Volta Redonda	21	(1)
2012	Cuiabá	33	(2)
2013–2014	São Bernardo	24	(0)
2014	→ Paysandu (loan)	15	(0)
2015	Capivariano	11	(2)
2015–2017	Paysandu	66	(1)
2018	Guarani	13	(1)
2019	Água Santa	17	(1)
2019–2020	Náutico	22	(1)
2020	Criciúma	5	(0)
2021	Portuguesa	16	(0)
2022–2023	Desportivo Brasil	19	(0)
2022	→ Veranópolis (loan)	14	(0)

Managerial career
- 2023–2024: Desportivo Brasil U20
- 2024: Desportivo Brasil (assistant)
- 2025: Azuriz (assistant)
- 2025: Brasil de Pelotas (assistant)
- 2025–2026: Água Santa (assistant)
- 2026: Portuguesa (assistant)
- * Club domestic league appearances and goals

Fernando Lombardi (born 17 January 1982) is a Brazilian football coach and former player who played as a centre-back.

== Playing career ==
Born in Curitiba, Lombardi began his career with hometown side Paraná Clube, making his first team debut in 2001. He became a regular starter in the 2004 season, before being loaned out to Spanish Segunda División side Levante in August 2005.

Lombardi departed the Granotes in June 2006, after failing to play a single minute for the club, and signed for América de Natal in August. On 11 July 2007, he agreed to a deal with Ceará.

Lombardi began the 2008 season at Rio Claro, before moving to Caxias in May of that year. He then played for Mogi Mirim and Vila Nova in 2009, before signing for Atlético Sorocaba on 23 November of that year.

Lombardi spent the 2011 campaign at Volta Redonda, where he was regularly used, and agreed to a deal with Cuiabá on 10 December of that year. He then moved to São Bernardo, before being loaned out to Paysandu on 4 August 2014.

On 2 January 2015, Lombardi joined Capivariano for the Campeonato Paulista. On 1 May, he returned to Papão, where he played 52 matches in the 2016 season.

On 19 January 2018, Guarani announced the signing of Lombardi on a contract for the Campeonato Paulista Série A2. He subsequently represented Água Santa, before signing a short-term deal with Náutico on 8 May 2019.

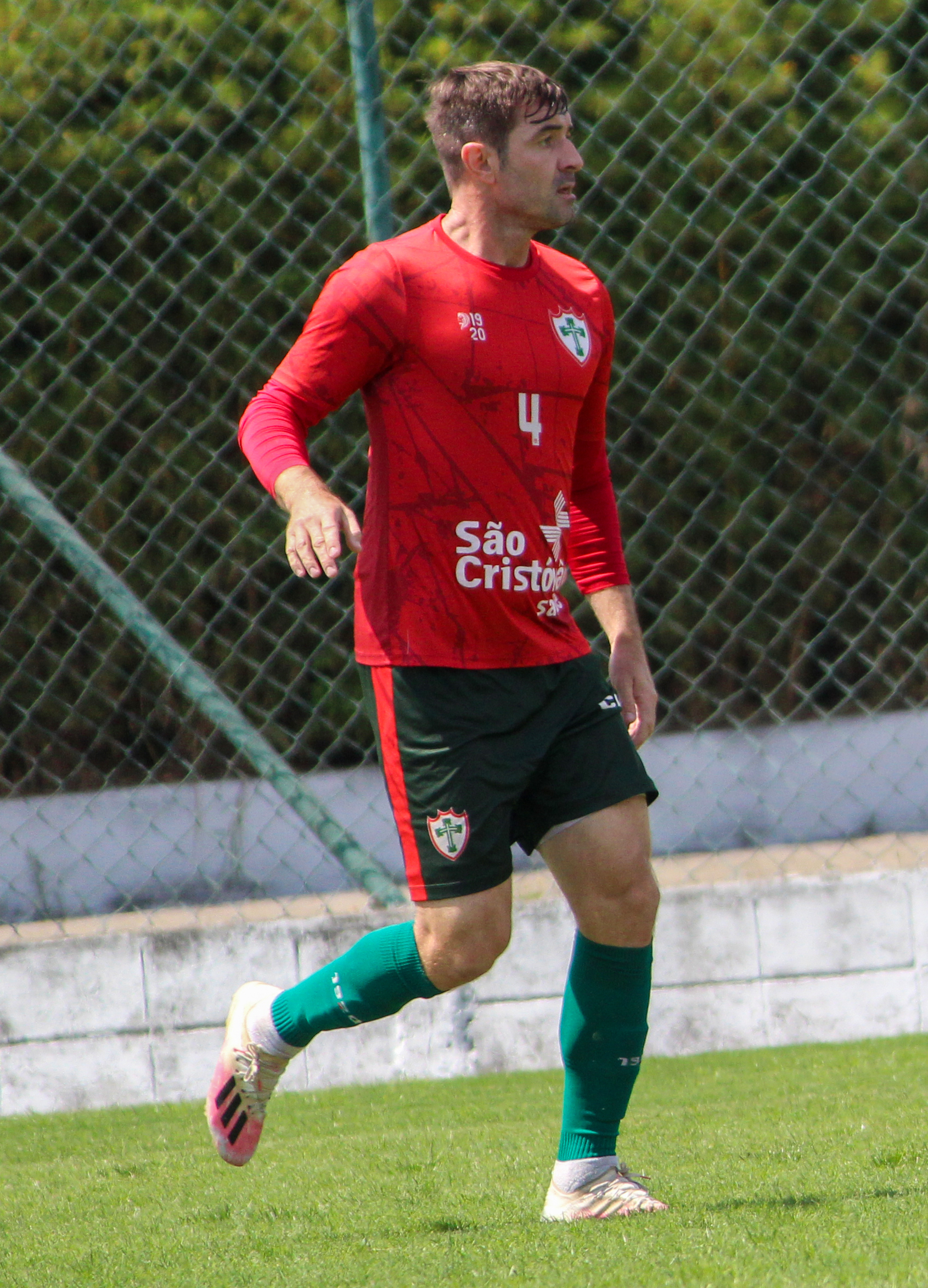
Lombardi in action for Portuguesa in 2021

On 21 October 2020, Lombardi was announced at Criciúma until the end of the year. He moved to Portuguesa the following 12 January, being a regular starter during the 2021 Série A2 but losing space in the 2021 Série D.

On 11 March 2022, Lombardi was announced at Desportivo Brasil, but was loaned to Veranópolis late in that month. Back to his parent club in July, he retired in April of the following year with DB, aged 41.

== Coaching career ==
Immediately after retiring, Lombardi became the under-20 coach of his last club Desportivo Brasil, and was the assistant of the first team in 2024. He later worked as Emerson Cris' assistant at Azuriz and Brasil de Pelotas, before returning to Água Santa in July, also as an assistant.

In April 2026, Lombardi returned to another club he represented as a player, Portuguesa, after becoming the assistant of Ademir Fesan, whom he also had worked at Água Santa.

== Honours ==
São Bernardo

- Copa Paulista: 2013

Paysandu

- Campeonato Paraense: 2016, 2017

Guarani

- Campeonato Paulista Série A2: 2018

Náutico

- Campeonato Brasileiro Série C: 2019
