= Raphael Luz =

Brazilian footballer

Personal information
- Full name: Raphael Luz Pessoa
- Date of birth: 18 July 1989 (age 37)
- Place of birth: Goiânia, Brazil
- Height: 1.76 m (5 ft 9 1/2 in)
- Position: Attacking midfielder

Team information
- Current team: Aparecidense

Youth career
- 2006–2008: São Paulo

Senior career*
Years	Team	Apps	(Gls)
2009	Bahia		
2010	Atlético Goianiense	0	(0)
2011	Novo Hamburgo	0	(0)
2011	Goiânia		
2012–2013	Aparecidense	6	(1)
2013–2014	Goiás	0	(0)
2014	Anapolina	9	(4)
2015	Cuiabá	15	(1)
2015	Atlético Goianiense	7	(1)
2016	Paysandu	9	(1)
2016–2017	Botafogo PB	4	(0)
2017–2018	Oeste	38	(7)
2019	São Bernardo	0	(0)
2019	Ferroviária	7	(1)
2019	→ Boa Esporte (loan)	5	(1)
2019	Água Santa	0	(0)
2020	Aparecidense	0	(0)
2020	Boa Esporte	9	(3)
2020–2021	Portuguesa	28	(7)
2021	Inhumas		
2022	Oeste	18	(5)
2022	Floresta	17	(5)
2022	Oeste	0	(0)
2022	Inhumas		
2023	ABC	12	(4)
2023–	Aparecidense	9	(2)
- * Club domestic league appearances and goals as of 26 August 2023

Raphael Luz Pessoa (born 18 July 1989) is a Brazilian footballer who plays as an attacking midfielder for Aparecidense.

== Biography ==
Raphael Luz is a playmaker formed by São Paulo Futebol Clube (2006-2008). After that he played in clubs like Cruzeiro and Goiás. Raphael Luz is a playmaker who started his career at São Paulo Futebol Clube (2006–2008). After that he played in clubs like Cruzeiro, Goiás and Bahia. In January 2015 he arrived to Cuiabá Esporte Clube. In 2015, he was champion with Cuiabá of Copa Verde and Mato Grosso state League.

Raphael Luz scored 8 goals in Copa Verde, being the top scorer of the tournament scoring three goals in the final game against Remo. He was elected the best player of Copa Verde 2015 and the best player also of the Mato Grosso state league 2015. In the final game of the state league, Raphael Luz also scored a goal in the 1×1 draw against Operário.

== Titles ==
Cuiabá

- Campeonato Mato-Grossense: 2015
- Copa Verde: 2015

Paysandu

- Campeonato Paraense: 2016
- Copa Verde: 2016

== Individual titles ==
Best player of Mato Grosso state league 2015 Top Scorer and best player of the Copa Verde (Green Cup)
