= Fabinho Alves =

Brazilian footballer (born 1986)

Personal information
- Full name: Fábio da Silva Alves
- Date of birth: June 11, 1986 (age 40)
- Place of birth: Vitória, Brazil
- Height: 1.74 m (5 ft 9 in)
- Position: Striker

Youth career
- 2005–2006: Cruzeiro

Senior career*
Years	Team	Apps	(Gls)
2006–2011	Cruzeiro	1	(1)
2006–2007	→ Villa Nova (loan)		
2008	→ Cabofriense (loan)		
2008	→ Ipatinga (loan)	2	(0)
2009–2010	→ Villa Nova (loan)	5	(0)
2010–2011	→ Al Arabi (loan)	19	(1)
2011	→ Nacional N. Serrana (loan)		
2012	Villa Nova		
2012	Bangu	9	(0)
2012	Tupi	17	(0)
2013–2014	Chapecoense	67	(4)
2014–2016	ABC	33	(2)
2016	Paysandu	11	(0)
2017	Joinville	16	(0)
2017	Criciúma	13	(0)
2017	Volta Redonda	4	(0)
2018	Santa Cruz	14	(2)
2019	América RN	4	(0)
2019	Ipatinga	2	(0)
2020–2022	Tupynambás	13	(3)
2020	→ Sertãozinho (loan)	3	(0)
- * Club domestic league appearances and goals

Fábio "Fabinho" da Silva Alves (born June 11, 1986), is a Brazilian former professional footballer who played as a striker.
