= 2016 Copa Verde finals =

- Event: 2016 Copa Verde
Paysandu	Gama
(Pará)	(Federal District (Brazil))
3	2
- on aggregate

First leg
Paysandu	Gama
2	0
- Date: 3 May 2016
- Venue: Mangueirão, Belém
- Referee: Alisson Sidnei Furtado
- Attendance: 24,160

Second leg
Gama	Paysandu
2	1
- Date: 10 May 2016
- Venue: Bezerrão, Gama
- Referee: Elmo Alves Resende Cunha
- Attendance: 9,090

The 2016 Copa Verde finals was the final two-legged tie that decided the 2016 Copa Verde, the 3rd season of the Copa Verde, Brazil's regional cup football tournament organised by the Brazilian Football Confederation.

The finals were contested in a two-legged home-and-away format between Paysandu, from Pará, and Gama, from Distrito Federal.

Paysandu defeated Gama 3–2 on aggregate to win their first Copa Verde title.

== Teams ==
Team	Previous finals appearances (bold indicates winners)
(Pará) Paysandu	1 (2014)
(Federal District (Brazil)) Gama	None

=== Road to the final ===
Note: In all scores below, the score of the finalist is given first.

(Pará) Paysandu			Round	(Federal District (Brazil)) Gama		
Opponent	Venue	Score		Opponent	Venue	Score
Bye			Preliminary round	Bye		
(Amazonas (Brazilian state)) Fast Clube (won 4–1 on aggregate)	Away	1–1	Round of 16	(Tocantins) Interporto (won 4–1 on aggregate)	Away	1–1
(Amazonas (Brazilian state)) Fast Clube (won 4–1 on aggregate)	Home	3–0	Round of 16	(Tocantins) Interporto (won 4–1 on aggregate)	Home	3–0
(Acre (state)) Rio Branco (won 6–2 on aggregate)	Home	1–0	Quarter-finals	(Goiás) Vila Nova (tied 0–0 on aggregate, won 4–3 on penalties)	Away	0–0
(Acre (state)) Rio Branco (won 6–2 on aggregate)	Away	5–2	Quarter-finals	(Goiás) Vila Nova (tied 0–0 on aggregate, won 4–3 on penalties)	Home	0–0
(Pará) Remo (won 6–3 on aggregate)	Neutral	2–1	Semi-finals	(Goiás) Aparecidense (won 4–3 on aggregate)	Away	3–1
(Pará) Remo (won 6–3 on aggregate)	Neutral	4–2	Semi-finals	(Goiás) Aparecidense (won 4–3 on aggregate)	Home	1–2

== Format ==
The finals were played on a home-and-away two-legged basis. If tied on aggregate, the penalty shoot-out was used to determine the winner.

== Matches ==
=== First leg ===
3 May 2016
20:30 BRT (UTC−3)

Paysandu (Pará)	2–0	(Federal District (Brazil)) Gama
Celsinho 9'; Leandro Cearense 90+4'	Report

Mangueirão, Belém
Attendance: 24,160
Referee: Alisson Sidnei Furtado (Tocantins)

**Paysandu**	**Gama**

GK	1	(Brazil) Emerson
DF	13	(Brazil) Crystian
DF	3	(Brazil) Fernando Lombardi
DF	26	(Brazil) Gualberto
DF	25	(Brazil) Lucas Siqueira
MF	5	(Brazil) Ricardo Capanema	(yellow card) 32'
MF	8	(Brazil) Augusto Recife (c)
MF	6	(Brazil) Raí	(substituted off) 63'
MF	20	(Brazil) Celsinho	(yellow card) 82'
FW	11	(Brazil) Fabinho Alves	(substituted off) 81'
FW	9	(Brazil) Leandro Cearense	(yellow card) 44'
Substitutes:
MF	16	(Brazil) Raphael Luz	(substituted on) 63'
FW	29	(Brazil) Wanderson	(substituted on) 81'
Coach:
(Brazil) Dado Cavalcanti

GK	1	(Brazil) Pereira
DF	2	(Brazil) Dudu Gago
DF	3	(Brazil) Pedrão	(substituted off) 78'
DF	4	(Brazil) João Paulo
DF	6	(Brazil) Makeka
MF	5	(Brazil) Eduardo	(yellow card) 37'
MF	7	(Brazil) Lucas Almeida	(yellow card) 53'
MF	8	(Brazil) Michel Pires
MF	10	(Brazil) Fábio Gama	(substituted off) 70'
FW	11	(Brazil) Formiga
FW	9	(Brazil) Rafael Grampola	(substituted off) 90+1'
Substitutes:
DF	13	(Brazil) Jesiel	(substituted on) 90+1'
MF	16	(Brazil) Héricles	(substituted on) 78'
FW	17	(Brazil) Raone	(substituted on) 70'
Coach:
(Brazil) Arthur Bernardes

Assistant referees:
Bruno Raphael Pires (Goiás)
Eduardo Gonçalves da Cruz (Mato Grosso do Sul)
Fourth official:
Andrey da Silva e Silva (Pará)

=== Second leg ===
10 May 2016
20:30 BRT (UTC−3)

Gama (Federal District (Brazil))	2–1	(Pará) Paysandu
Rafael Grampola 73', 78' (pen.)	Report	Raí 3'

Bezerrão, Gama
Attendance: 9,090
Referee: Elmo Alves Resende Cunha (Goiás)

**Gama**	**Paysandu**

GK	1	(Brazil) Pereira
DF	2	(Brazil) Dudu Gago		(substituted off) 86'
DF	3	(Brazil) Pedrão
DF	4	(Brazil) João Paulo
DF	6	(Brazil) Lucas Almeida		(substituted off) 67'
MF	5	(Brazil) Eduardo		(yellow card) 26'
MF	7	(Brazil) Héricles
MF	8	(Brazil) Michel Pires
MF	10	(Brazil) Fábio Gama
FW	11	(Brazil) Raone		(red card) 28'
FW	9	(Brazil) Rafael Grampola
Substitutes:
DF	14	(Brazil) Adriano		(substituted on) 86'
FW	18	(Brazil) Ítalo	(yellow card) 85'	(substituted on) 67'
Coach:
(Brazil) Reinaldo Gueldini

GK	1	(Brazil) Emerson		(yellow card) 88'
DF	2	(Brazil) Roniery		(yellow card) 12'
DF	3	(Brazil) Fernando Lombardi
DF	26	(Brazil) Gualberto		(yellow card) 78'
DF	25	(Brazil) Lucas Siqueira
MF	5	(Brazil) Ricardo Capanema		(yellow card) 38' (yellow-red card) 59'
MF	8	(Brazil) Augusto Recife (c)		(yellow card) 21'
MF	6	(Brazil) Raí	(yellow card) 14'	(substituted off) 46'
MF	20	(Brazil) Celsinho
FW	11	(Brazil) Fabinho Alves		(substituted off) 9'
FW	9	(Brazil) Leandro Cearense
Substitutes:
MF	32	(Brazil) Rodrigo Andrade		(substituted on) 46'
MF	28	(Brazil) Paulinho		(substituted on) 84'
MF	16	(Brazil) Raphael Luz	(yellow card) 32'	(substituted on) 9' (substituted off) 84'
Coach:
(Brazil) Dado Cavalcanti

Assistant referees:
Cristhian Passos Sorence (Goiás)
Leone Carvalho Rocha (Goiás)
Fourth official:
Breno Vieira Souza (Goiás)

== See also ==
- 2017 Copa do Brasil
