= 2015 Campeonato Brasiliense =

Campeonato Brasiliense
- Season: 2015
- Champions: Gama
- Relegated: Ceilandense
- Série D: Gama
- Copa Verde: Gama; Brasília
- Copa do Brasil: Gama; Brasília
- Matches played: 68
- Goals scored: 149 (2.19 per match)
- Biggest home win: Luziânia 4–0 Ceilandense (11 February 2015)
- Biggest away win: Cruzeiro-DF 0–3 Santa Maria (1 March 2015)
- Highest scoring: Luziânia 4–0 Ceilandense (11 February 2015)

The 2015 Campeonato Brasiliense de Futebol was the 40th edition of the Federal District's top professional football league. The competition began on 25 January and ended on 2 May. Gama won the championship, securing their 11th title.

== First stage ==
Pos	Team	Pld	W	D	L	GF	GA	GD	Pts	Qualification or relegation
1	Brasília	10	6	3	1	14	6	+8	21	Qualifies to the Final stage
2	Gama	10	6	2	2	10	5	+5	20	Qualifies to the Final stage
3	Brasiliense	10	5	4	1	15	9	+6	19	Qualifies to the Final stage
4	Ceilândia	10	4	4	2	14	8	+6	16	Qualifies to the Final stage
5	Luziânia	10	4	2	4	14	10	+4	14	Qualifies to the Final stage
6	Sobradinho	10	3	4	3	11	9	+2	13	Qualifies to the Final stage
7	Formosa	10	3	4	3	9	12	−3	13	Qualifies to the Final stage
8	Paracatu	10	3	3	4	11	14	−3	12	Qualifies to the Final stage
9	Cruzeiro-DF	10	2	3	5	7	13	−6	9	
10	Santa Maria	10	1	3	6	10	16	−6	6	
11	Ceilandense	10	0	4	6	6	19	−13	4	Relegated

== Final stage ==
Quarter-finals
Sobradinho	1	0	1
Brasiliense	1	0	1
Formosa	1	1	2
Gama	0	2	2
Luziânia	2	1	3
Ceilândia	1	1	2
Paracatu	1	0	1
Brasília	3	2	5

Semi-finals
Brasiliense	0	1	1
Gama	2	0	2
Luziânia	1	1	2
Brasília	1	1	2

Finals
Gama	3	1	4
Brasília	0	0	0

== Finals ==
25 April 2015
16:30 UTC-3

Gama	3–0	Brasília
Rafael Grampola 66'; Héricles 74'; Daniel 84'	Report

Estádio Mané Garrincha, Brasília
Attendance: 8,396
Referee: Christiano Nascimento
2 May 2015
16:30 UTC-3

Brasília	0–1	Gama
	Report	Rafael Grampola 90+2'

Estádio Mané Garrincha, Brasília
Attendance: 24,046
Referee: Rodrigo Raposo

Gama won 4–0 on aggregate.
