= 2015 Campeonato Roraimense =

Campeonato Roraimense
- Season: 2015
- Champions: Náutico
- Série D: Náutico
- Copa Verde: Náutico
- Copa do Brasil: Náutico
- Matches played: 24
- Goals scored: 84 (3.5 per match)
- Top goalscorer: Rafael Barros (11 goals)
- Biggest home win: Náutico 6–1 GAS (25 April 2015)
- Biggest away win: Atlético Roraima 0–8 São Raimundo (18 April 2015)

The 2015 Campeonato Roraimense de Futebol was the 56th edition of Roraima's top professional football league. The competition began on 28 March and ended on 9 May. Náutico won the championship by the 3rd time.

== First stage ==
Pos	Team	Pld	W	D	L	GF	GA	GD	Pts	Qualification
1	Náutico	5	4	0	1	14	6	+8	12	Qualifies to the Final
2	São Raimundo	5	4	0	1	21	4	+17	12	
3	Rio Negro	5	2	1	2	5	11	−6	7	
4	Baré	5	2	0	3	8	9	−1	6	
5	Atlético Roraima	5	1	1	3	5	17	−12	4	
6	GAS	5	1	0	4	4	10	−6	3	

== Second stage ==
=== Group A ===
Pos	Team	Pld	W	D	L	GF	GA	GD	Pts	Qualification
1	Náutico	2	1	1	0	6	1	+5	4	Qualifies to the semi-finals
2	Baré	2	1	1	0	4	1	+3	4	Qualifies to the semi-finals
3	GAS	2	0	0	2	2	10	−8	0	

=== Group B ===
Pos	Team	Pld	W	D	L	GF	GA	GD	Pts	Qualification
1	São Raimundo	2	2	0	0	5	1	+4	6	Qualifies to the semi-finals
2	Atlético Roraima	2	1	0	1	4	2	+2	3	Qualifies to the semi-finals
3	Rio Negro	2	0	0	2	0	6	−6	0	

=== Semi-finals ===
5 May 2015
19:00 UTC−04:00

Náutico	1–1	Atlético Roraima
Alex 9'	Report	Athos 61'
Penalties
Elton (penalty scored); Marabá (penalty missed); Eduardo (penalty scored); Alex (penalty scored); Robemar (penalty scored)	4–3	(penalty missed) Uarlei; (penalty scored) Raul; (penalty scored) Pedrão; (penalty scored) Roger; (penalty missed) Athos

Ribeirão, Boa Vista
Referee: Gerválio Taigo

5 May 2015
20:50 UTC−04:00

São Raimundo	0–1	Baré
	Report	Thales Patrick 73'

Ribeirão, Boa Vista
Referee: José Ordilo

=== Final ===
9 May 2015
17:00 UTC−04:00

Náutico	2–1	Baré
Eduardo 58'; Alex 66'	Report	Thales Patrick 71'

Ribeirão, Boa Vista
Referee: Yungo Paiva
