= Felipe Manoel =

Brazilian footballer (born 1989)

Personal information
- Full name: Felipe Manoel Gonçalves
- Date of birth: 4 November 1989 (age 37)
- Place of birth: São Paulo, Brazil
- Height: 1.83 m (6 ft 0 in)
- Position: Central midfielder

Team information
- Current team: America-RJ
- Number: 35

Youth career
- 2004–2007: São Bernardo

Senior career*
Years	Team	Apps	(Gls)
2008–2010	Villarreal	0	(0)
2008	→ Sport (loan)	0	(0)
2008	→ Huesca (loan)	11	(0)
2009	→ Levante (loan)	4	(0)
2010	Villarreal B	1	(0)
2011	Caxias	7	(0)
2012	Paysandu	0	(0)
2012	Santa Cruz-RS	6	(0)
2012	Novo Hamburgo	0	(0)
2013	Santa Cruz-RS	6	(0)
2013	Santa Cruz-PA	0	(0)
2014	Guaratinguetá	0	(0)
2015	Nacional-AM	27	(3)
2016	Rio Preto	3	(1)
2016	Marítimo	0	(0)
2016	Bragantino	7	(0)
2017	Sertãozinho	12	(0)
2017	São Bento	16	(0)
2018	Portuguesa	7	(0)
2018	América RN	3	(0)
2018–2019	Avenida	39	(0)
2020	ABC	20	(0)
2020	XV de Piracicaba	6	(0)
2020	Ituano	20	(0)
2021	XV de Piracicaba	13	(1)
2021	ABC	23	(0)
2022	Concórdia	14	(1)
2022–2023	Brusque	3	(0)
2023	Concórdia	12	(0)
2023	Aparecidense	12	(0)
2023-2025	Marcílio Dias	41	(1)
2024	→ Betim (loan)	2	(0)
2024	→ Maricá (loan)	13	(0)
2025	→ Tubarão-SC (loan)	6	(1)
2025	→ Mixto-MT (loan)	6	(0)
2025-	Brasiliense-DF	4	(0)
2025-	→ America-RJ (loan)	20	(0)
- * Club domestic league appearances and goals as of 16:48, 19 March 2020 (UTC)

Felipe Manoel Gonçalves (born 4 November 1989), known as Felipe Manoel or simply Felipe, is a Brazilian professional footballer who plays for America-RJ as a central midfielder.

== Football career ==
Born in São Paulo, Felipe Manoel was signed by Villarreal CF on 30 January 2008, still a youngster, from São Bernardo Futebol Clube. He was immediately loaned to Sport Club do Recife, until 30 June.

Felipe split the 2008–09 season in the Spanish second division, starting off at SD Huesca. In December 2008 he moved to Levante UD, and appeared only six times between the two teams combined.

Felipe Manoel spent the first months of the new campaign unregistered. In the 2010 January transfer window, however, he was assigned to Villarreal's reserves also in the second level. Later in the year, he returned to his country, signing a five-year contract with Sociedade Esportiva e Recreativa Caxias do Sul in division three but being released in November 2011.

Felipe subsequently resumed his career in the lower levels, representing Paysandu Sport Club, Futebol Clube Santa Cruz (two stints), Esporte Clube Novo Hamburgo, Associação Atlética Santa Cruz, Guaratinguetá Futebol, Nacional Futebol Clube and Rio Preto Esporte Clube.

On 29 June 2016, Felipe Manoel signed with Portuguese C.S. Marítimo, but he terminated his contract shortly after and returned to his country.

== Honours ==
Sport Club Recife

- Copa do Brasil: 2008
- Campeonato Amazonense: 2015
