= 2015 Campeonato Mato-Grossense =

Campeonato Mato-Grossense
- Season: 2015
- Champions: Cuiabá
- Relegated: Sinop; União Rondonópolis
- Série D: CEOV
- Copa Verde and Copa do Brasil: Cuiabá; CEOV

The 2015 Campeonato Mato-Grossense de Futebol was the 73rd edition of the Mato Grosso's top professional football league. The competition began on 1 February and ended on 11 May. Cuiabá won the championship for the 6th time.

== First phase ==
=== Group A ===
Pos	Team	Pld	W	D	L	GF	GA	GD	Pts	Qualification or relegation
1	CEOV	8	4	1	3	12	10	+2	13	Qualifies to the Second phase
2	Poconé	8	4	0	4	13	12	+1	12	Qualifies to the Second phase
3	FLU	0	0	0	0	0	0	0	0	Qualifies to the Second phase
4	BAR	0	0	0	0	0	0	0	0	
5	Sinop	8	3	3	2	8	8	0	8 (Note: Sinop lost 4 points for using 3 irregular players.)	Relegated

=== Group B ===
Pos	Team	Pld	W	D	L	GF	GA	GD	Pts	Qualification or relegation
1	Cuiabá	8	5	3	0	10	1	+9	18	Qualifies to the Second phase
2	Dom Bosco	8	3	1	4	8	10	−2	10	Qualifies to the Second phase
3	Rondonópolis	8	2	3	3	10	8	+2	9	Qualifies to the Second phase
4	Cacerense	8	2	2	4	10	17	−7	0 (Note: Cacerense lost 8 points for using 3 irregular players.)	
5	União Rondonópolis	8	2	3	3	9	11	−2	−7 (Note: União Rondonópolis lost 16 points for using 13 irregular players.)	Relegated

== Second phase ==
=== Group C ===
Pos	Team	Pld	W	D	L	GF	GA	GD	Pts	Qualification
1	Luverdense	6	4	2	0	10	6	+4	14	Qualifies to the Semifinals
2	CEOV	6	3	0	3	5	6	−1	9	Qualifies to the Semifinals
3	Poconé	6	0	1	5	5	11	−6	1	

=== Group D ===
Pos	Team	Pld	W	D	L	GF	GA	GD	Pts	Qualification
1	Cuiabá	6	4	0	2	10	7	+3	12	Qualifies to the Semifinals
2	Rondonópolis	6	3	1	2	9	7	+2	10	Qualifies to the Semifinals
3	Dom Bosco	6	1	2	3	4	6	−2	5	

== Semifinals ==
Team 1	Agg.	Team 2	1st leg	2nd leg
CEOV	3–3 (5–4 p)	Luverdense	1–2	2–1
Rondonópolis	0–5	Cuiabá	0–2	0–3

== Finals ==
May 3, 2015
15:00 UTC−4

CEOV	0–1	Cuiabá
	Report	Kaique 53'

Arena Pantanal, Cuiabá
Attendance: 2,400
Referee: Alinor da Silva Paixão

May 11, 2015
15:40 UTC−4

Cuiabá	1–1	CEOV
Raphael Luz 43'	Report	Éder Grilo 63'

Arena Pantanal, Cuiabá
Attendance: 13,240
Referee: Wagner Reway

Cuiabá won 2–1 on aggregate.
