= 2015 Campeonato Rondoniense =

Campeonato Rondoniense de Futebol
- Season: 2015
- Champions: Genus
- Série D: Vilhena
- Copa Verde: Genus
- Copa do Brasil: Genus
- Top goalscorer: (Brazil) Cabixi (9 goals)
- Biggest away win: Guajará 0–4 Vilhena (14 June 2015)
- Highest scoring: Vilhena 3–4 Genus (4 July 2015)

The 2015 Campeonato Rondoniense de Futebol was the 25th edition of Rondônia's top professional football league. The competition began on 5 April and ended on 4 July. Genus won the championship for the first time.

== Format ==
The five teams compete in two rounds. In the first round, the teams face each other, and the top two advance to the final. The champion secures a spot in the 2015 Campeonato Brasileiro Série D. In the second round, the champion earns a place in the 2016 Copa Verde.

After these two phases, the final will be held between the champions of both rounds in a two-leg matchup. If the same team wins both rounds, they will be declared the league champion. The overall champion will also receive a berth in the 2016 Copa do Brasil.

== First round ==
Pos	Team	Pld	W	D	L	GF	GA	GD	Pts	Qualification
1	Vilhena (A)	4	2	2	0	7	2	+5	8	Qualifies to the final
2	Ji-Paraná (A)	4	2	2	0	6	2	+4	8	Qualifies to the final
3	Ariquemes	4	1	2	1	4	5	−1	5	
4	Genus	4	0	3	1	2	3	−1	3	
5	Guajará	4	0	1	3	0	7	−7	1	

(A) Advance to a further round

=== Final ===
==== First leg ====
7 May 2015
20:30 UTC -4

Ji-Paraná	1–1	Vilhena
André Morosini 46'	Report	Cabixi 38' (pen.)

Biancão, Ji-Paraná
Referee: Fledes Rodrigues

==== Second leg ====
10 May 2015
16:00 UTC -4

Vilhena	4–0	Ji-Paraná
Cabixi 22', 72'; Edilsinho 49'; Salatiel 86'	Report

Estádio Portal da Amazônia, Vilhena
Referee: Arnoldo Figarela

== Second round ==
Pos	Team	Pld	W	D	L	GF	GA	GD	Pts	Qualification
1	Vilhena (A)	4	4	0	0	9	1	+8	12	Qualifies to the final
2	Genus (A)	4	3	0	1	9	2	+7	9	Qualifies to the final
3	Ariquemes	4	1	1	2	4	3	+1	4	
4	Ji-Paraná	4	1	0	3	6	10	−4	3	
5	Guajará	4	0	1	3	0	12	−12	1	

(A) Advance to a further round

=== Final ===
==== First leg ====
18 June 2015
20:00 UTC -4

Genus	1–0	Vilhena
Fernandinho 65'	Report

Estádio Aluízio Ferreira, Porto Velho
Referee: Arnoldo Figarela

==== Second leg ====
21 June 2015
15:30 UTC -4

Vilhena	1–1	Genus
Cabixi 90+3'	Report	Tcharlles 61'

Estádio Portal da Amazônia, Vilhena
Referee: Sidnei Pereira Oliveira

== Finals ==
=== First leg ===
28 June 2015
20:00 UTC -4

Genus	2–1	Vilhena
Tcharles 7', 38'	Report	Cabixi 63'

Estádio Aluízio Ferreira, Porto Velho
Attendance: 3,200
Referee: Jonathan Antero

=== Second leg ===
5 July 2015
16:00 UTC -4

Vilhena	3–4	Genus
Edilsinho 10'; Cabixi 39', 66'	Report	Fernandinho 50' (pen.); Thiago Xuxa 60', 67'; Guarate 79'

Estádio Portal da Amazônia, Vilhena
Referee: Arnoldo Vasconcelos Figarela
