= Pedrão (footballer, born 1986) =

Brazilian footballer

Personal information
- Full name: Pedro Luiz Barone
- Date of birth: 29 June 1986 (age 40)
- Place of birth: Viana, Espírito Santo, Brazil
- Height: 1.87 m (6 ft 2 in)
- Position: Defender

Team information
- Current team: Gama

Senior career*
| Years | Team | Apps | (Gls) |
| 2007 | ASA | | |
| 2008 | GEL | | |
| 2009–2011 | Gama | | |
| 2009 | → Ceilandense (loan) | | |
| 2011–2013 | Ipatinga | | |
| 2013–2014 | Pelotas | | |
| 2015– | Gama | | |
- * Club domestic league appearances and goals as of 18 January 2017

Pedro Luiz Barone (born June 29, 1986 in Viana, Espírito Santo), commonly known as Pedrão, is a Brazilian footballer who plays for Gama as defender. He also played for Ipatinga in Campeonato Brasileiro Série B.

== Career statistics ==
As of 18 January 2017

| Club | Season | League | | | State League | | Cup | | Conmebol | | Other | | Total | |
| Club | Season | Division | Apps | Goals | Apps | Goals | Apps | Goals | Apps | Goals | Apps | Goals | Apps | Goals |
|---|---|---|---|---|---|---|---|---|---|---|---|---|---|---|
| Gama | 2009 | Série C | 4 | 1 | 2 | 0 | — | | — | | — | | 6 | 1 |
| Gama | 2010 | Série C | 5 | 1 | 12 | 0 | — | | — | | — | | 17 | 1 |
| Gama | 2011 | Série D | — | | 19 | 0 | — | | — | | — | | 19 | 0 |
| Gama | Subtotal | | 9 | 2 | 33 | 0 | — | | — | | — | | 42 | 2 |
| Ipatinga | 2011 | Série C | 12 | 0 | — | | — | | — | | — | | 12 | 0 |
| Ipatinga | 2012 | Série B | 20 | 2 | 8 | 0 | 1 | 0 | — | | — | | 29 | 2 |
| Ipatinga | 2013 | Série C | — | | 7 | 1 | — | | — | | — | | 7 | 1 |
| Ipatinga | Subtotal | | 32 | 2 | 15 | 1 | 1 | 0 | — | | — | | 48 | 3 |
| Pelotas | 2014 | Série D | 8 | 0 | 9 | 0 | — | | — | | — | | 17 | 0 |
| Gama | 2015 | Série D | 7 | 0 | 10 | 1 | — | | — | | — | | 17 | 1 |
| Gama | 2016 | Brasiliense | — | | 10 | 0 | 4 | 0 | — | | 8 | 0 | 22 | 0 |
| Gama | Subtotal | | 7 | 0 | 20 | 1 | 4 | 0 | — | | 8 | 0 | 39 | 1 |
| Career total | | | 56 | 4 | 70 | 1 | 5 | 0 | 0 | 0 | 8 | 0 | 149 | 5 |
