= 2015 Campeonato Baiano =

Campeonato Baiano
- Season: 2015
- Champions: Bahia
- Relegated: Catuense; Serrano
- Série D: Colo Colo
- Copa do Brasil: Bahia; Vitória da Conquista
- Copa do Nordeste: Bahia; Vitória da Conquista; Juazeirense
- Top goalscorer: Kieza (Bahia) (8 goals)

The 2015 Campeonato Baiano de Futebol was the 111th edition of Bahia's top professional football league. The competition began on 31 January and ended on 3 May. Bahia won the championship for the 46th time.

== First phase ==
=== Group A ===
Pos	Team	Pld	W	D	L	GF	GA	GD	Pts
1	Bahia	6	3	1	2	14	7	+7	10
2	Juazeirense	6	2	3	1	4	5	−1	9
3	Colo Colo	6	2	2	2	2	2	0	8
4	Galícia	6	2	2	2	5	6	−1	8
5	Bahia de Feira	6	1	5	0	3	2	+1	8
6	Serrano	6	2	1	3	7	9	−2	7

=== Group B ===
Pos	Team	Pld	W	D	L	GF	GA	GD	Pts
1	Vitória da Conquista	6	4	2	0	8	3	+5	14
2	Vitória	6	2	4	0	4	1	+3	10
3	Jacuipense	6	2	3	1	9	6	+3	9
4	Catuense	6	2	1	3	7	6	+1	7
5	Jacobina	6	0	3	3	2	6	−4	3
6	Feirense	6	0	1	5	1	13	−12	1

== Relegation playoffs ==
Team 1	Agg.	Team 2	1st leg	2nd leg
Feirense	3–2	Catuense	2–2	1–0
Jacobina	4–2	Serrano	1–1	3–1

== Quarterfinals ==
Team 1	Agg.	Team 2	1st leg	2nd leg
Bahia de Feira	2–2	Vitória da Conquista	0–0	2–2
Colo Colo	3–2	Vitória	1–2	2–0
Juazeirense	4–2	Jacuipense	1–1	3–1
Galícia	0–9	Bahia	0–5	0–4

== Semifinals ==
Team 1	Agg.	Team 2	1st leg	2nd leg
Vitória da Conquista	4–1	Colo Colo	3–0	1–1
Juazeirense	3–5	Bahia	1–2	2–3

== 3rd place playoffs ==
Team 1	Agg.	Team 2	1st leg	2nd leg
Colo Colo	1–2	Juazeirense	1–0	0–2

== Finals ==
April 26, 2015
16:00 UTC−4

Vitória da Conquista	3–0	Bahia
Fausto 47'; Diego Aragão 67'; André Beleza 73'	Report

Estádio Lomanto Júnior, Vitória da Conquista
Attendance: 8,369
Referee: Lúcio José Silva de Aragão

May 3, 2015
16:00 UTC−4

Bahia	6-0	Vitória da Conquista
Robson 9'; Bruno Paulista 13'; Kieza 22', 84'; Souza 62' (pen.), 71' (pen.)	Report

Arena Fonte Nova, Salvador
Attendance: 20,914
Referee: Jaílson Macedo Freitas

Bahia won 6–3 on aggregate.
