= 2015 Campeonato Paulista =

Campeonato Paulista - Série A1
- Season: 2015
- Dates: January 31 – May 03, 2015
- Teams: 20
- Champions: Santos
- Relegated: Penapolense; Portuguesa; Bragantino; Marília
- Série D: Red Bull Brasil; Botafogo
- Matches: 158
- Goals: 330 (2.09 per match)
- Top goalscorer: Ricardo Oliveira (11 goals)
- Biggest home win: São Paulo 4–0 Audax (21 February); São Bernardo 4–0 Marília Atlético Clube (8 April)
- Biggest away win: Red Bull Brasil 1–6 Audax (6 March)
- Highest scoring: Corinthians 5–3 Penapolense (26 March)

The 2015 Campeonato Paulista de Futebol Profissional da Primeira Divisão - Série A1 (officially the 2015 Paulistão Itaipava for sponsorship reasons) was the 114th season of São Paulo's top professional football league.

== Format ==
- In the first stage the twenty teams are drawn, with seeding, into four groups of five teams each, with each team playing once against the fifteen clubs from the other three groups. After each team has played fifteen matches, the top two teams of each group qualify for the quarter-final stage.
- After the completion of the first stage, the four clubs with the lowest number of points, regardless of the group, will be relegated to the Campeonato Paulista Série A2.
- If all four clubs with the lowest number of points are from the same group, the best third-placed club from the other groups will qualify for the quarter-final stage.

=== Tiebreakers ===
The teams are ranked according to points (3 points for a win, 1 point for a draw, 0 points for a loss). If two or more teams are equal on points on completion of the group matches, the following criteria are applied to determine the rankings:

1. Higher number of wins;
2. Superior goal difference;
3. Higher number of goals scored;
4. Fewest red cards received;
5. Fewest yellow cards received;
6. Draw in the headquarters of the FPF.

== Teams ==
| Club | Home city | 2014 result |
|---|---|---|
| Botafogo | Ribeirão Preto | 5th |
| Bragantino | Bragança Paulista | 8th |
| Capivariano | Capivari | 1st (Série A2) |
| Corinthians | São Paulo (Tatuapé) | 9th |
| Audax | Osasco | 11th |
| Ituano | Itu | 1st |
| Linense | Lins | 16th |
| Mogi Mirim | Mogi Mirim | 15th |
| Marília | Marília | 4th (Série A2) |
| Palmeiras | São Paulo (Perdizes) | 3rd |
| Penapolense | Penápolis | 4th |
| Ponte Preta | Campinas | 7th |
| Portuguesa | São Paulo (Pari) | 12th |
| Red Bull Brasil | Campinas | 2nd (Série A2) |
| Rio Claro | Rio Claro | 13th |
| Santos | Santos | 2nd |
| São Bento | Sorocaba | 3rd (Série A2) |
| São Bernardo | São Bernardo do Campo | 10th |
| São Paulo | São Paulo (Morumbi) | 6th |
| XV de Piracicaba | Piracicaba | 14th |

Source: Futebol Paulista

== First stage ==
=== Group A ===
| Pos | Team | Pld | W | D | L | GF | GA | GD | Pts | Qualification |
|---|---|---|---|---|---|---|---|---|---|---|
| 1 | São Paulo (A) | 15 | 10 | 2 | 3 | 30 | 10 | +20 | 32 | Advance to the quarter-finals |
| 2 | Red Bull Brasil (A) | 15 | 7 | 3 | 5 | 20 | 19 | +1 | 24 | Advance to the quarter-finals |
| 3 | Mogi Mirim | 15 | 5 | 5 | 5 | 17 | 20 | −3 | 20 | |
| 4 | Ituano | 15 | 4 | 8 | 3 | 12 | 13 | −1 | 20 | |
| 5 | São Bernardo | 15 | 5 | 3 | 7 | 13 | 13 | 0 | 18 | |

(A) Advance to a further round

=== Group B ===
| Pos | Team | Pld | W | D | L | GF | GA | GD | Pts | Qualification |
|---|---|---|---|---|---|---|---|---|---|---|
| 1 | Corinthians (A) | 15 | 11 | 4 | 0 | 28 | 10 | +18 | 37 | Advance to the quarter-finals |
| 2 | Ponte Preta (A) | 15 | 8 | 3 | 4 | 22 | 17 | +5 | 27 | Advance to the quarter-finals |
| 3 | Audax | 15 | 6 | 4 | 5 | 23 | 19 | +4 | 22 | |
| 4 | São Bento | 15 | 4 | 9 | 2 | 17 | 13 | +4 | 21 | |
| 5 | Rio Claro | 15 | 4 | 4 | 7 | 11 | 16 | −5 | 16 | |

(A) Advance to a further round

=== Group C ===
| Pos | Team | Pld | W | D | L | GF | GA | GD | Pts | Qualification |
|---|---|---|---|---|---|---|---|---|---|---|
| 1 | Palmeiras (A) | 15 | 10 | 1 | 4 | 23 | 10 | +13 | 31 | Advance to the quarter-finals |
| 2 | Botafogo (A) | 15 | 6 | 4 | 5 | 16 | 14 | +2 | 22 | Advance to the quarter-finals |
| 3 | Linense | 15 | 4 | 4 | 7 | 12 | 25 | −13 | 16 | |
| 4 | Portuguesa | 15 | 2 | 7 | 6 | 13 | 22 | −9 | 13 | |
| 5 | Marília | 15 | 0 | 2 | 13 | 6 | 35 | −29 | 2 | |

(A) Advance to a further round

=== Group D ===
| Pos | Team | Pld | W | D | L | GF | GA | GD | Pts | Qualification |
|---|---|---|---|---|---|---|---|---|---|---|
| 1 | Santos (A) | 15 | 10 | 4 | 1 | 29 | 12 | +17 | 34 | Advance to the quarter-finals |
| 2 | XV de Piracicaba (A) | 15 | 5 | 3 | 7 | 17 | 20 | −3 | 18 | Advance to the quarter-finals |
| 3 | Capivariano | 15 | 4 | 4 | 7 | 20 | 23 | −3 | 16 | |
| 4 | Penapolense | 15 | 4 | 3 | 8 | 17 | 22 | −5 | 15 | |
| 5 | Bragantino | 15 | 2 | 1 | 12 | 8 | 22 | −14 | 7 | |

Source: Globo Esporte
(A) Advance to a further round

== Knockout stage ==
=== Bracket ===
Quarterfinals
D1 | Santos | 3
D2 | XV de Piracicaba | 0
A1 | São Paulo | 3
A2 | Red Bull Brasil | 0
B1 | Corinthians | 1
B2 | Ponte Preta | 0
C1 | Palmeiras | 1
C2 | Botafogo | 0

Semifinals
D1 | Santos | 2
A1 | São Paulo | 1
B1 | Corinthians | 2 (5)
C1 | Palmeiras (p) | 2 (6)

Finals
D1 | Santos (p) | 0 | 2 | 2 (4)
C1 | Palmeiras | 1 | 1 | 2 (2)

Note: Semifinal bracket depended on the general table: 1 vs 4; 2 vs 3

== General table ==
| Pos | Team | Pld | W | D | L | GF | GA | GD | Pts | Qualification or relegation |
|---|---|---|---|---|---|---|---|---|---|---|
| 1 | Santos | 19 | 13 | 4 | 2 | 36 | 15 | +21 | 43 | Champion and 2016 Copa do Brasil |
| 2 | Palmeiras | 19 | 12 | 2 | 5 | 28 | 14 | +14 | 38 | Runner-up and 2016 Copa do Brasil round of 16 (Note: Palmeiras has a berth guaranteed to the third stage as the 2015 Copa do Brasil champions. Corinthians and São Paulo has a berth guaranteed to the third stage as 2015 Campeonato Brasileiro Série A champions and 3rd) |
| 3 | Corinthians | 17 | 12 | 5 | 0 | 31 | 12 | +19 | 41 | Eliminated in Semifinals and 2016 Copa do Brasil round of 16 |
| 4 | São Paulo | 17 | 11 | 2 | 4 | 34 | 12 | +22 | 35 | Eliminated in Semifinals and 2016 Copa do Brasil round of 16 |
| 5 | Ponte Preta | 16 | 8 | 3 | 5 | 22 | 18 | +4 | 27 | Eliminated in Quarterfinals and 2016 Copa do Brasil |
| 6 | Red Bull Brasil | 16 | 7 | 3 | 6 | 20 | 22 | −2 | 24 | Eliminated in Quarterfinals, Série D and 2016 Copa do Brasil |
| 7 | Botafogo | 16 | 6 | 4 | 6 | 16 | 15 | +1 | 22 | Eliminated in Quarterfinals and Série D |
| 8 | XV de Piracicaba | 16 | 5 | 3 | 8 | 17 | 23 | −6 | 18 | Eliminated in Quarterfinals |
| 9 | Audax | 15 | 6 | 4 | 5 | 23 | 19 | +4 | 22 | Eliminated in the group stage |
| 10 | São Bento | 15 | 4 | 9 | 2 | 17 | 13 | +4 | 21 | Eliminated in the group stage |
| 11 | Ituano | 15 | 4 | 8 | 3 | 12 | 13 | −1 | 20 | Eliminated in the group stage |
| 12 | Mogi Mirim | 15 | 5 | 5 | 5 | 17 | 20 | −3 | 20 | Eliminated in the group stage |
| 13 | São Bernardo | 15 | 5 | 3 | 7 | 13 | 13 | 0 | 18 | Eliminated in the group stage |
| 14 | Capivariano | 15 | 4 | 4 | 7 | 20 | 23 | −3 | 16 | Eliminated in the group stage |
| 15 | Rio Claro | 15 | 4 | 4 | 7 | 11 | 16 | −5 | 16 | Eliminated in the group stage |
| 16 | Linense | 15 | 4 | 4 | 7 | 13 | 25 | −12 | 16 | Eliminated in the group stage |
| 17 | Penapolense (R) | 15 | 4 | 3 | 8 | 17 | 22 | −5 | 15 | Relegation to 2016 Campeonato Paulista Série A2 |
| 18 | Portuguesa (R) | 15 | 2 | 7 | 6 | 13 | 22 | −9 | 13 | Relegation to 2016 Campeonato Paulista Série A2 |
| 19 | Bragantino (R) | 15 | 2 | 1 | 12 | 8 | 22 | −14 | 7 | Relegation to 2016 Campeonato Paulista Série A2 |
| 20 | Marília (R) | 15 | 0 | 2 | 13 | 6 | 35 | −29 | 2 | Relegation to 2016 Campeonato Paulista Série A2 |

Updated to match(es) played on April 27, 2015. Source: Soccerway.com
Rules for classification: 1st points; 2nd wins; 3rd goal difference; 4th goals scored; 5th head-to-head results; 6th least red cards received; 7th least yellow cards received; 8th draw.
(R) Relegated

== Top scorers ==
As of 3 May 2015

| Rank | Player | Club | Goals |
|---|---|---|---|
| 1 | (Brazil) Ricardo Oliveira | Santos | 11 |
| 2 | (Brazil) Crislan | Penapolense | 9 |
| 3 | (Brazil) Alexandre Pato | São Paulo | 8 |
| 3 | (Brazil) Rafael Longuine | Audax | 8 |
| 4 | (Brazil) Alan Kardec | São Paulo | 7 |
| 4 | (Brazil) Edmilson | Red Bull Brasil | 7 |
| 4 | (Brazil) Paulinho | XV de Piracicaba | 7 |
| 5 | (Brazil) Biro-Biro | Ponte Preta | 6 |
| 5 | (Peru) Paolo Guerrero | Corinthians | 6 |
| 5 | (Brazil) Rafael Marques | Palmeiras | 6 |

== Awards ==
=== Team of the year ===
| Pos. | Player | Club |
|---|---|---|
| GK | (Brazil) Fernando Prass | Palmeiras |
| DF | (Brazil) Fagner | Corinthians |
| DF | (Brazil) Gil | Corinthians |
| DF | (Brazil) David Braz | Santos |
| DF | (Brazil) Zé Roberto | Palmeiras |
| MF | (Brazil) Arouca | Palmeiras |
| MF | (Brazil) Gabriel | Palmeiras |
| MF | (Brazil) Robinho | Palmeiras |
| MF | (Brazil) Lucas Lima | Santos |
| FW | (Brazil) Ricardo Oliveira | Santos |
| FW | (Brazil) Robinho | Santos |

Source Globo Esporte
Last updated: 30 April 2015

Player of the Season

The Player of the Year was awarded to Ricardo Oliveira.

Young Player of the Season

The Young Player of the Year was awarded to Rafael Longuine.

Countryside Best Player of the Season

The Countryside Best Player of the Year was awarded to Crislan.

Top scorer of the Season

The top scorer of the season was Ricardo Oliveira, who scored 11 goals.
