= 2015 Campeonato Amazonense =

Campeonato Amazonense
- Season: 2015
- Champions: Nacional
- Relegated: Rio Negro; Operário
- Série D: Nacional
- Copa Verde: Nacional
- Copa do Brasil: Nacional; Princesa do Solimões

The 2015 Campeonato Amazonense de Futebol was the 99th edition of Amazonas's top professional football league. The competition began on 21 February and ended on 20 June. Nacional won the championship by the 43rd time.

== Format ==
In the first stage all participating teams play each other. The first four teams placed at the end of this first stage will be classified for the semifinals.

In the semifinals, the first place will face the fourth while the second place will face the third. They will be played two games, and both the first and second place will have the advantage of getting two results equal to advance to the final.

In the final two games will be played, and the team from the two involved in the dispute, with the best record in the first stage, will have the advantage of getting two results equal to be the champion.

== First stage ==
Pos	Team	Pld	W	D	L	GF	GA	GD	Pts	Qualification or relegation
1	Nacional	18	16	0	2	48	11	+37	48	Qualifies to the semi-finals
2	Fast Clube	18	13	1	4	53	14	+39	40	Qualifies to the semi-finals
3	Princesa do Solimões	18	11	4	3	37	20	+17	37	Qualifies to the semi-finals
4	Penarol	18	10	3	5	30	24	+6	33	Qualifies to the semi-finals
5	São Raimundo	18	8	2	8	28	33	−5	26	
6	Manaus	18	8	0	10	26	27	−1	24	
7	Nacional Borbense	18	7	1	10	26	31	−5	22	
8	Iranduba	18	5	5	8	30	40	−10	20	
9	Rio Negro	18	3	1	14	17	52	−35	10	Relegated
10	Operário	18	0	1	17	21	64	−43	1	Relegated

== Semi-finals ==
=== First leg ===
31 May 2015
15:00 UTC−04:00

Penarol	0–2	Nacional
		Felipe Manoel 44'; Lídio 45+3'

Estádio Floro de Mendonça, Itacoatiara
Attendance: 1,850
Referee: João Cunha de Brito

30 May 2015
18:00 UTC−04:00

Princesa do Solimões	0–1	Fast Clube
		Romarinho 38'

Estádio da Colina, Manaus
Attendance: 198
Referee: Antônio Frutuoso

=== Second leg ===
6 June 2015
15:00 UTC−04:00

Nacional	2–3	Penarol
Fininho 15'; Hyantony 64'		Binho 40'; Tety 47', 87' (pen.)

Estádio da Colina, Manaus
Attendance: 417
Referee: Walter Francisco dos Santos

7 June 2015
18:00 UTC−04:00

Fast Clube	0–2	Princesa do Solimões
		Ley 73'; Léo Paraíba 79'

Estádio da Colina, Manaus
Attendance: 403
Referee: Carlos Augusto de Souza

== Finals ==
=== First leg ===
13 June 2015
15:00 UTC−04:00

Nacional	1–0	Princesa do Solimões
Maurício Leal 54'

Arena da Amazônia, Manaus
Attendance: 2,881
Referee: João Cunha de Brito

=== Second leg ===
20 June 2015
15:00 UTC−04:00

Princesa do Solimões	1–2	Nacional
Nando 89'	Report	Júnior Paraíba 65' (pen.); Charles 90+1'

Arena da Amazônia, Manaus
Attendance: 6,787
Referee: Edmar Campos da Encarnação
