= 2017 Copa do Brasil Second Round =

The 2017 Copa do Brasil Second Round was played from 22 February to 8 March 2017, to decide the 20 teams advancing to the Third Round. In this year, this round was decided in a single match. In case of tie, the qualified team was determined by penalty shoot-out.

== Matches ==
| Team 1 | Score | Team 2 |
|---|---|---|
| Sport (Pernambuco) | 3–0 | (Mato Grosso do Sul) Sete de Dourados |
| Portuguesa (São Paulo (state)) | 0–2 | (Rio de Janeiro (state)) Boavista |
| Gurupi (Tocantins) | 2–0 | (Acre (state)) Rio Branco |
| Joinville (Santa Catarina (state)) | 1–0 | (Pará) São Raimundo |
| Cruzeiro (Minas Gerais) | 6–0 | (Pará) São Francisco |
| Murici (Alagoas) | 0–0 (5–4 p) | (Minas Gerais) América Mineiro |
| Sinop (Mato Grosso) | 1–3 | (Rio de Janeiro (state)) Fluminense |
| Criciúma (Santa Catarina (state)) | 2–2 (4–3 p) | (Piauí) Altos |
| Internacional (Rio Grande do Sul) | 4–1 | (São Paulo (state)) Oeste |
| Sampaio Corrêa (Maranhão) | 2–0 | (Ceará) Guarani de Juazeiro |
| Brusque (Santa Catarina (state)) | 0–0 (4–5 p) | (São Paulo (state)) Corinthians |
| Avaí (Santa Catarina (state)) | 1–1 (2–3 p) | (Mato Grosso) Luverdense |
| Ponte Preta (São Paulo (state)) | 1–1 (4–5 p) | (Mato Grosso) Cuiabá |
| Boa Esporte (Minas Gerais) | 0–0 (2–3 p) | Goiás |
| Vila Nova (Goiás) | 1–2 | (Rio de Janeiro (state)) Vasco da Gama |
| Vitória (Bahia) | 3–2 | (São Paulo (state)) Bragantino |
| Coritiba (Paraná (state)) | 0–2 | (Alagoas) ASA |
| Paraná (Paraná (state)) | 2–0 | Bahia |
| PSTC (Paraná (state)) | 2–4 | (São Paulo (state)) São Paulo |
| ABC (Rio Grande do Norte) | 1–1 (4–1 p) | (São Paulo (state)) Audax |

=== Match 41 ===
February 22, 2017
21:45 UTC−03:00

| Sport (Pernambuco) | 3–0 | (Mato Grosso do Sul) Sete de Dourados |
|---|---|---|
| Leandro Pereira 11', 23'; Rogério 48' | Report |

Estádio Ilha do Retiro, Recife
Attendance: 2,020
Referee: Adriano Milczvski (Paraná)

=== Match 42 ===
February 22, 2017
19:30 UTC−03:00

| Portuguesa (São Paulo (state)) | 0–2 | (Rio de Janeiro (state)) Boavista |
|---|---|---|
| | Report | Vitor Faísca 67'; Lucas Rocha 90+3' |

Estádio do Canindé, São Paulo
Attendance: 1,599
Referee: Emerson de Almeida Ferreira (Minas Gerais)

=== Match 43 ===
March 1, 2017
20:30 UTC−03:00

| Gurupi (Tocantins) | 2–0 | (Acre (state)) Rio Branco |
|---|---|---|
| Ederson 68', 90' | Report |

Estádio Gilberto Resende, Gurupi
Attendance: 2,076
Referee: Leandro Bizzio Marinho (São Paulo)

=== Match 44 ===
March 1, 2017
20:30 UTC−03:00

| Joinville (Santa Catarina (state)) | 1–0 | (Pará) São Raimundo |
|---|---|---|
| Aldair 26' | Report |

Arena Joinville, Joinville
Attendance: 1,880
Referee: Wanderson Alves de Sousa (Minas Gerais)

=== Match 45 ===
February 22, 2017
21:45 UTC−03:00

| Cruzeiro (Minas Gerais) | 6–0 | (Pará) São Francisco |
|---|---|---|
| Rafael Sóbis 5', 22', 26', 37'; Robinho 18'; De Arrascaeta 77' | Report |

Mineirão, Belo Horizonte
Attendance: 11,931
Referee: Eduardo Tomaz de Aquino Valadão (Goiás)

=== Match 46 ===
February 22, 2017
16:00 UTC−03:00

| Murici (Alagoas) | 0–0 | (Minas Gerais) América Mineiro |
|---|---|---|
| | Report |
Penalties
| Kattê (penalty scored); Deysinho (penalty scored); Tarcísio (penalty scored); Patrick (penalty scored); Paulo Sérgio (penalty missed); João Paulo (penalty scored) | 5–4 | (penalty missed) Marion; (penalty scored) Tony; (penalty scored) Pilar; (penalty scored) Gérson Magrão; (penalty scored) Rafael Lima; (penalty missed) Juninho |

Estádio José Gomes da Costa, Murici
Attendance: 719
Referee: Marielson Alves Silva (Bahia)

=== Match 47 ===
March 1, 2017
20:30 UTC−03:00

| Sinop (Mato Grosso) | 1–3 | (Rio de Janeiro (state)) Fluminense |
|---|---|---|
| Alex Ricardo 39' | Report | Sornoza 53', 82'; Henrique Dourado 73' (pen.) |

Estádio Municipal Gigante do Norte, Sinop
Attendance: 5,806
Referee: Elmo Alves Resende Cunha (Goiás)

=== Match 48 ===
February 22, 2017
19:30 UTC−03:00

| Criciúma (Santa Catarina (state)) | 2–2 | (Piauí) Altos |
|---|---|---|
| Adalgiso Pitbull 13'; Dodi 88' | Report | Uilliam 81'; Thiaguinho 90+5' |
Penalties
| Dodi (penalty missed); Alex Maranhão (penalty scored); Marlon (penalty scored); Barreto (penalty scored); Pimentinha (penalty scored) | 4–3 | (penalty scored) Thiaguinho; (penalty missed) André Tavares; (penalty scored) Uilliam; (penalty scored) Dos Santos; (penalty missed) Jeremias |

Estádio Heriberto Hülse, Criciúma
Attendance: 3,416
Referee: Roger Goulart (Rio Grande do Sul)

=== Match 49 ===
February 22, 2017
21:45 UTC−03:00

| Internacional (Rio Grande do Sul) | 4–1 | (São Paulo (state)) Oeste |
|---|---|---|
| Brenner 5', 57' (pen.); Carlos 15'; Charles 31' | Report | Tiago Adan 50' |

Estádio Beira-Rio, Porto Alegre
Attendance: 9,308
Referee: João Batista de Arruda (Rio de Janeiro)

=== Match 50 ===
March 1, 2017
20:30 UTC−03:00

| Sampaio Corrêa (Maranhão) | 2–0 | (Ceará) Guarani de Juazeiro |
|---|---|---|
| Giovani 50'; Breno 68' | Report |

Castelão, São Luís
Attendance: 889
Referee: Andrey da Silva e Silva (Pará)

=== Match 51 ===
March 1, 2017
21:45 UTC−03:00

| Brusque (Santa Catarina (state)) | 0–0 | (São Paulo (state)) Corinthians |
|---|---|---|
| | Report |
Penalties
| Jonatas Belusso (penalty scored); Willian (penalty scored); Eliomar (penalty scored); Ricardo Lobo (penalty scored); João Carlos (penalty missed); Carlos Alberto (penalty missed) | 4–5 | (penalty missed) Jádson; (penalty scored) Giovanni Augusto; (penalty scored) Maycon; (penalty scored) Fagner; (penalty scored) Jô; (penalty scored) Romero |

Estádio Augusto Bauer, Brusque
Attendance: 4,070
Referee: Pericles Bassols Pegado Cortez (Pernambuco)

=== Match 52 ===
March 1, 2017
19:30 UTC−03:00

| Avaí (Santa Catarina (state)) | 1–1 | (Mato Grosso) Luverdense |
|---|---|---|
| Júnior Dutra 66' | Report | Diogo Sodré 12' |
Penalties
| Marquinhos (penalty missed); Júnior Dutra (penalty scored); Rômulo (penalty missed); Alemão (penalty scored); Leandro Silva (penalty missed) | 2–3 | (penalty scored) Rafael Silva; (penalty scored) Paulinho; (penalty missed) Aderlan; (penalty scored) Raphael Macena |

Estádio da Ressacada, Florianópolis
Attendance: 4,093
Referee: Rodrigo Batista Raposo (Distrito Federal)

=== Match 53 ===
March 2, 2017
19:30 UTC−03:00

| Ponte Preta (São Paulo (state)) | 1–1 | (Mato Grosso) Cuiabá |
|---|---|---|
| Lucca 20' | Report | Cleberson 38' |
Penalties
| William Pottker (penalty scored); Lucca (penalty scored); Ravanelli (penalty scored); Ramon (penalty scored); Matheus Jesus (penalty missed) | 4–5 | (penalty scored) Dakson; (penalty scored) Douglas Mendes; (penalty scored) Robinho; (penalty scored) Richard; (penalty scored) Udson |

Estádio Moisés Lucarelli, Campinas
Attendance: 2,225
Referee: Dyorgines José Padovani de Andrade (Espírito Santo)

=== Match 54 ===
March 1, 2017
21:45 UTC−03:00

| Boa Esporte (Minas Gerais) | 0–0 | Goiás |
|---|---|---|
| | Report |
Penalties
| Ramón (penalty missed); Josué (penalty scored); Radamés (penalty scored); Jean Henrique (penalty missed); Michael (penalty missed) | 2–3 | (penalty scored) Léo Gamalho; (penalty missed) Victor Bolt; (penalty scored) Everton Sena; (penalty missed) Tiago Luís; (penalty scored) Léo Sena |

Melão, Varginha
Attendance: 1,224
Referee: Alisson Sidnei Furtado (Tocantins)

=== Match 55 ===
March 1, 2017
21:45 UTC−03:00

| Vila Nova (Goiás) | 1–2 | (Rio de Janeiro (state)) Vasco da Gama |
|---|---|---|
| Wallyson 32' (pen.) | Report | Thalles 16'; Wágner 85' |

Estádio Serra Dourada, Goiânia
Attendance: 15,613
Referee: Leandro Pedro Vuaden (Rio Grande do Sul)

=== Match 56 ===
February 22, 2017
19:30 UTC−03:00

| Vitória (Bahia) | 3–2 | (São Paulo (state)) Bragantino |
|---|---|---|
| André Lima 21'; Cleiton Xavier 27'; Fred 54' | Report | Vitor 34' (pen.); Daniel 77' |

Barradão, Salvador
Attendance: 5,374
Referee: Braulio da Silva Machado (Santa Catarina)

=== Match 57 ===
February 23, 2017
21:30 UTC−03:00

| Coritiba (Paraná (state)) | 0–2 | (Alagoas) ASA |
|---|---|---|
| | Report | Eron 45'; Leandro Kivel 90+3' |

Estádio Couto Pereira, Curitiba
Attendance: 5,163
Referee: Paulo Henrique Schleich Vollkopf (Mato Grosso do Sul)

=== Match 58 ===
March 8, 2017
19:30 UTC−03:00 (Note: The Paraná v Bahia match was originally to be kicked off on February 25 at 16:30 local time, but it was postponed due to the late arrival of Bahia to Curitiba.)

| Paraná (Paraná (state)) | 2–0 | Bahia |
|---|---|---|
| Eduardo Brock 51'; Renatinho 84' | Report |

Estádio Vila Capanema, Curitiba
Attendance: 9,481
Referee: Vinicius Goncalves Dias Araujo (São Paulo)

=== Match 59 ===
March 1, 2017
19:30 UTC−03:00

| PSTC (Paraná (state)) | 2–4 | (São Paulo (state)) São Paulo |
|---|---|---|
| Lucão 15'; Carlos 45' | Report | Cícero 14', 36', 72'; Cueva 43' (pen.) |

Estádio do Café, Londrina
Attendance: 14,604
Referee: Marcelo de Lima Henrique (Rio de Janeiro)

=== Match 60 ===
March 1, 2017
19:30 UTC−03:00

| ABC (Rio Grande do Norte) | 1–1 | (São Paulo (state)) Audax |
|---|---|---|
| Caio Mancha 86' (pen.) | Report | Léo Artur 80' |
Penalties
| Gegê (penalty scored); Cleiton (penalty scored); Dalberto (penalty scored); Márcio Passos (penalty scored) | 4–1 | (penalty scored) Pedro Carmona; (penalty missed) Ytalo; (penalty missed) Hugo |

Frasqueirão, Natal
Attendance: 4,158
Referee: André Luiz de Freitas Castro (Goiás)
