= 2015 Campeonato Brasileiro Série D =

Campeonato Brasileiro Série D
- Season: 2015
- Champions: Botafogo-SP (1st title)
- Promoted: Botafogo-SP; Ypiranga de Erechim; Remo; Ríver
- Matches: 190
- Goals: 426 (2.24 per match)
- Top goalscorer: (Brazil) Jô (12 goals)
- Biggest home win: São Caetano 5–0 Lajeadense (12 July 2015); Duque de Caxias 5–0 Villa Nova (12 July 2015)
- Highest scoring: Foz do Iguaçu 4–5 Volta Redonda (5 September 2015)
- Highest attendance: 40,000; Ríver 0–0 Botafogo-SP (11 November 2015)
- Lowest attendance: 5 Villa Nova 0–2 CRAC (13 September 2015)

The 2015 Campeonato Brasileiro Série D, the fourth level of the Brazilian League, was contested by 40 clubs, and started on July 12 and ended on November 15, 2015. The four teams in the semifinals were promoted to the 2016 Campeonato Brasileiro Série C.

== Competition format ==
The 40 teams are divided in eight groups of 5, playing within them in a double round-robin format. The two best ranked in each group at the end of 8 rounds will qualify to the Second Stage, which will be played in home-and-away system. Winners advance to Third Stage. The quarterfinal winners will be promoted to the 2016 Série C. As there is no Série E, or fifth division, technically there will be no relegation. However, teams who were not promoted will have to re-qualify for 2016 Série D through their respective state leagues.

== Participating teams ==
Team	Home city	State	Qualified as
Aparecidense	Aparecida de Goiânia	GO	2015 Campeonato Goiano runners-up
Botafogo-SP	Ribeirão Preto	SP	2015 Campeonato Paulista 7th place
Caldense	Poços de Caldas	MG	2015 Campeonato Mineiro runners-up
Campinense	Campina Grande	PB	2015 Campeonato Paraibano champions
Central	Caruaru	PE	2015 Campeonato Pernambucano 4th place
Colo Colo	Ilhéus	BA	2015 Campeonato Baiano 4th place
Comercial-MS	Campo Grande	MS	2015 Campeonato Sul-Mato-Grossense champions
Coruripe	Coruripe	AL	2015 Campeonato Alagoano runners-up
CRAC	Catalão	GO	19th in 2014 Série C
CEOV	Várzea Grande	MT	2015 Campeonato Mato-Grossense Runners-up
Duque de Caxias	Duque de Caxias	RJ	20th in 2014 Série C
Estanciano	Estância	SE	2015 Campeonato Sergipano runners-up
Foz do Iguaçu	Foz do Iguaçu	PR	2015 Campeonato Paranaense 4th place
Gama	Gama	DF	2015 Campeonato Brasiliense champions
Globo	Ceará-Mirim	RN	2015 Campeonato Potiguar 3rd place
Goianésia	Goianésia	GO	2015 Campeonato Goiano 3rd place
Guarani de Juazeiro	Juazeiro do Norte	CE	2015 Campeonato Cearense 4th place
Imperatriz	Imperatriz	MA	2015 Campeonato Maranhense champions
Inter de Lages	Lages	SC	2015 Campeonato Catarinense 4th place
Lajeadense	Lajeado	RS	2014 Supercopa Gaúcha champions
Metropolitano	Blumenau	SC	2015 Campeonato Catarinense 5th place
Nacional	Manaus	AM	2014 Campeonato Amazonense champions
Náutico-RR	Boa Vista	RR	2015 Campeonato Roraimense champions
Operário Ferroviário	Ponta Grossa	PR	2015 Campeonato Paranaense champions
Palmas	Palmas	TO	2014 Campeonato Tocantinense 3rd place
Red Bull Brasil	Campinas	SP	2015 Campeonato Paulista 6th place
Remo	Belém	PA	2015 Campeonato Paraense champions
Resende	Resende	RJ	2014 Copa Rio champions
Rio Branco	Rio Branco	AC	2015 Campeonato Acreano champions
Rio Branco-ES	Cariacica	ES	2015 Campeonato Capixaba champions
Ríver	Teresina	PI	2015 Campeonato Piauiense champions
Santos-AP	Macapá	AP	2014 Campeonato Amapaense champions
São Caetano	São Caetano do Sul	SP	17th in 2014 Série C
Serrano	Vitória da Conquista	BA	2014 Copa Governador do Estado da Bahia 3rd place
Serra Talhada	Serra Talhada	PE	2015 Campeonato Pernambucano 5th place
Treze	Campina Grande	PB	18th in 2014 Série C
Villa Nova	Nova Lima	MG	2015 Campeonato Mineiro 6th place
Vilhena	Vilhena	RO	2015 Campeonato Rondoniense first round champions
Volta Redonda	Volta Redonda	RJ	2015 Campeonato Carioca 7th place
Ypiranga de Erechim	Erechim	RS	2015 Campeonato Gaúcho 5th place

== First stage ==
=== Group A1 ===
Pos	Team	Pld	W	D	L	GF	GA	GD	Pts
1	(Pará) Remo (A)	8	5	2	1	14	6	+8	17
2	(Acre (state)) Rio Branco (A)	8	4	3	1	10	6	+4	15
3	(Amazonas (Brazilian state)) Nacional	8	2	2	4	10	12	−2	8
4	(Rondônia) Vilhena	8	1	3	4	8	14	−6	6
5	(Roraima) Náutico-RR	8	2	2	4	8	12	−4	4 (Note: Náutico lost 4 points for using 17 irregular players.)

(A) Advance to the Round of 16

=== Group A2 ===
Pos	Team	Pld	W	D	L	GF	GA	GD	Pts
1	(Piauí) Ríver (A)	8	4	4	0	8	3	+5	16
2	(Tocantins) Palmas (A)	8	4	2	2	7	4	+3	14
3	(Amapá) Santos-AP	8	3	1	4	8	11	−3	10
4	(Maranhão) Imperatriz	8	2	2	4	11	11	0	8
5	(Ceará) Guarani de Juazeiro	8	0	5	3	4	9	−5	5

(A) Advance to the Round of 16

=== Group A3 ===
Pos	Team	Pld	W	D	L	GF	GA	GD	Pts
1	(Paraíba) Campinense (A)	8	4	2	2	10	5	+5	14
2	(Alagoas) Coruripe (A)	8	3	4	1	15	10	+5	13
3	(Bahia) Colo Colo	8	3	2	3	9	12	−3	8 (Note: Colo Colo lost 3 points for using 3 irregular players.)
4	(Pernambuco) Serra Talhada	8	2	2	4	7	9	−2	8
5	(Rio Grande do Norte) Globo	8	2	2	4	5	10	−5	8

(A) Advance to the Round of 16

=== Group A4 ===
Pos	Team	Pld	W	D	L	GF	GA	GD	Pts
1	(Pernambuco) Central (A)	8	5	1	2	11	5	+6	16
2	(Sergipe) Estanciano (A)	8	5	0	3	14	11	+3	15
3	(Paraíba) Treze	8	4	3	1	11	5	+6	15
4	(Goiás) Goianésia	8	1	2	5	3	10	−7	5
5	(Bahia) Serrano	8	1	2	5	6	14	−8	5

(A) Advance to the Round of 16

=== Group A5 ===
Pos	Team	Pld	W	D	L	GF	GA	GD	Pts
1	(Espírito Santo) Rio Branco-ES (A)	8	5	2	1	12	7	+5	17
2	(Minas Gerais) Caldense (A)	8	4	2	2	8	4	+4	14
3	(Goiás) Aparecidense	8	3	4	1	9	5	+4	13
4	(Mato Grosso do Sul) Comercial	8	2	1	5	6	10	−4	7
5	(Mato Grosso) CEOV	8	1	1	6	7	16	−9	4

(A) Advance to the Round of 16

=== Group A6 ===
Pos	Team	Pld	W	D	L	GF	GA	GD	Pts
1	(Goiás) CRAC (A)	8	5	3	0	7	1	+6	18
2	(São Paulo (state)) Botafogo-SP (A)	8	3	4	1	11	5	+6	13
3	(Federal District (Brazil)) Gama	8	3	4	1	9	6	+3	13
4	(Rio de Janeiro (state)) Duque de Caxias	8	2	1	5	10	11	−1	7
5	(Minas Gerais) Villa Nova	8	1	0	7	9	23	−14	3

(A) Advance to the Round of 16

=== Group A7 ===
Pos	Team	Pld	W	D	L	GF	GA	GD	Pts
1	(Rio Grande do Sul) Ypiranga de Erechim (A)	8	5	1	2	7	3	+4	16
2	(Paraná (state)) Operário Ferroviário (A)	8	5	1	2	11	8	+3	16
3	(Rio de Janeiro (state)) Resende	8	2	3	3	9	10	−1	9
4	(São Paulo (state)) Red Bull Brasil	8	2	2	4	5	8	−3	8
5	(Santa Catarina (state)) Inter de Lages	8	2	1	5	6	9	−3	7

(A) Advance to the Round of 16

=== Group A8 ===
Pos	Team	Pld	W	D	L	GF	GA	GD	Pts
1	(São Paulo (state)) São Caetano (A)	8	6	1	1	22	5	+17	19
2	(Rio Grande do Sul) Lajeadense (A)	8	4	3	1	11	9	+2	15
3	(Rio de Janeiro (state)) Volta Redonda	8	3	0	5	10	14	−4	9
4	(Santa Catarina (state)) Metropolitano	8	2	2	4	8	12	−4	8
5	(Paraná (state)) Foz do Iguaçu	8	1	2	5	10	21	−11	5

(A) Advance to the Round of 16

== Round of 16 ==
Team 1	Agg.	Team 2	1st leg	2nd leg
Coruripe	1–3	São Caetano	0–3	1–0
Botafogo-SP	3–1	CRAC	3–0	0–1
Palmas	1–3	Remo	1–0	0–3
Caldense	2–1	Rio Branco-ES	1–1	1–0
Lajeadense	6–1	Central	4–0	2–1
Rio Branco-AC	0–4	Ypiranga de Erechim	0–1	0–3
Estanciano	2–4	Ríver	2–1	0–3
Operário Ferroviário	1–1 (4-3 p)	Campinense	1–0	0–1

== Quarterfinals ==
Team 1	Agg.	Team 2	1st leg	2nd leg
Botafogo-SP	2–1	São Caetano	2–1	0–0
Caldense	2–2 (3–4 p)	Ypiranga de Erechim	1–1	1–1
Ríver	4–1	Lajeadense	3–0	1–1
Operário Ferroviário	1–4	Remo	0–1	1-3

== Semifinals ==
Team 1	Agg.	Team 2	1st leg	2nd leg
Ríver	2–2 (5–4 p)	Ypiranga de Erechim	2–0	0–2
Botafogo-SP	1–0	Remo	1–0	0–0

== Finals ==
Team 1	Agg.	Team 2	1st leg	2nd leg
Botafogo-SP	3–2	Ríver	3–2	0–0
