= 2017 Copa do Brasil Fourth Round =

The 2017 Copa do Brasil Fourth Round was played from 12 April to 19 April 2017, to decide the 5 teams advancing to the Round of 16. In this year, each tie was played on a home-and-away two-legged basis. If tied on aggregate, the away goals rule would be used. If still tied, extra time would not be played, and the penalty shoot-out would be used to determine the winner.

== Draw ==
A draw for the fourth round was held by CBF on March 17, 2017. The 10 qualified teams were in a single group.

- 2017 CBF ranking shown in brackets.

Group
- (São Paulo (state)) Corinthians (4)
- (Minas Gerais) Cruzeiro (6)
- (Rio Grande do Sul) Internacional (7)
- (São Paulo (state)) São Paulo (8)
- (Rio de Janeiro (state)) Fluminense (10)
- (Pernambuco) Sport (17)
- Goiás (18)
- (Bahia) Vitória (20)
- (Santa Catarina (state)) Joinville (28)
- (Paraná (state)) Paraná (33)

== Matches ==
Team 1	Agg.	Team 2	1st leg	2nd leg
Sport (Pernambuco)	3–3 (4–3 p)	(Santa Catarina (state)) Joinville	2–1	1–2
Vitória (Bahia)	0–2	(Paraná (state)) Paraná	0–2	0–0
Goiás	2–4	(Rio de Janeiro (state)) Fluminense	2–1	0–3
Internacional (Rio Grande do Sul)	2–2 (4–3 p)	(São Paulo (state)) Corinthians	1–1	1–1
São Paulo (São Paulo (state))	2–3	(Minas Gerais) Cruzeiro	0–2	2–1

=== Match 71 ===
April 12, 2017
21:45 UTC−03:00

Sport (Pernambuco)	2–1	(Santa Catarina (state)) Joinville
Rithely 24'; Juninho 83'	Report	Bruno Batata 47'

Estádio Ilha do Retiro, Recife
Attendance: 4,781
Referee: Rodolpho Toski Marques (Paraná)

April 19, 2017
21:45 UTC−03:00

Joinville (Santa Catarina (state))	2–1	(Pernambuco) Sport
Bruno Rodrigues 76'; Marlyson 89'	Report	Leandro Pereira 72'
Penalties
Aldair (penalty scored); Fernandinho (penalty missed); Breno (penalty scored); Danrlei (penalty missed); Bruno Rodrigues (penalty scored)	3–4	(penalty scored) Everton Felipe; (penalty missed) Leandro Pereira; (penalty scored) Lenis; (penalty scored) Fabrício; (penalty scored) Matheus Ferraz

Arena Joinville, Joinville
Attendance: 4,934
Referee: Dewson Fernando Freitas da Silva (Pará)

Tied 3–3 on aggregate, Sport won on penalties and advanced to the round of 16.

=== Match 72 ===
April 13, 2017
19:15 UTC−03:00

Vitória (Bahia)	0–2	(Paraná (state)) Paraná
	Report	Airton 45+3'; Guilherme Biteco 88'

Barradão, Salvador
Attendance: 9,624
Referee: Wagner Reway (Mato Grosso)

April 19, 2017
19:30 UTC−03:00

Paraná (Paraná (state))	0–0	(Bahia) Vitória
	Report

Estádio Vila Capanema, Curitiba
Attendance: 8,698
Referee: Ricardo Marques (Minas Gerais)

Paraná won 2–0 on aggregate and advanced to the round of 16.

=== Match 73 ===
April 13, 2017
21:30 UTC−03:00

Goiás	2–1	(Rio de Janeiro (state)) Fluminense
Jean Carlos 84'; Léo Gamalho 88' (pen.)	Report	Marcos Júnior 9'

Estádio Serra Dourada, Goiânia
Attendance: 16,190
Referee: Marcelo Aparecido Ribeiro de Souza (São Paulo)

April 19, 2017
21:45 UTC−03:00

Fluminense (Rio de Janeiro (state))	3–0	Goiás
Henrique 57'; Nogueira 61'; Pedro 81'	Report

Maracanã, Rio de Janeiro
Attendance: 20,062
Referee: Raphael Claus (São Paulo)

Fluminense won 4–2 on aggregate and advanced to the round of 16.

=== Match 74 ===
April 12, 2017
21:45 UTC−03:00

Internacional (Rio Grande do Sul)	1–1	(São Paulo (state)) Corinthians
Rodrigo Dourado 57'	Report	Romero 53'

Estádio Beira-Rio, Porto Alegre
Attendance: 37,259
Referee: Wagner do Nascimento Magalhães (Rio de Janeiro)

April 19, 2017
21:45 UTC−03:00

Corinthians (São Paulo (state))	1–1	(Rio Grande do Sul) Internacional
Maycon 7'	Report	Fagner 71' (o.g.)
Penalties
Jádson (penalty scored); Maycon (penalty missed); Jô (penalty scored); Marquinhos Gabriel (penalty missed); Fagner (penalty scored); Guilherme Arana (penalty missed)	3–4	(penalty scored) Brenner; (penalty missed) William; (penalty scored) Valdívia; (penalty scored) Cuesta; (penalty missed) Léo Ortiz; (penalty scored) Diego

Arena Corinthians, São Paulo
Attendance: 32,691
Referee: Marcelo de Lima Henrique (Rio de Janeiro)

Tied 2–2 on aggregate, Internacional won on penalties and advanced to the round of 16.

=== Match 75 ===
April 13, 2017
21:30 UTC−03:00

São Paulo (São Paulo (state))	0–2	(Minas Gerais) Cruzeiro
	Report	Pratto 59' (o.g.); Hudson 70'

Estádio do Morumbi, São Paulo
Attendance: 43,662
Referee: Anderson Daronco (Rio Grande do Sul)

April 19, 2017
19:30 UTC−03:00

Cruzeiro (Minas Gerais)	1–2	(São Paulo (state)) São Paulo
Thiago Neves 59'	Report	Pratto 14'; Gilberto 78'

Mineirão, Belo Horizonte
Attendance: 36,193
Referee: Wilton Sampaio (Goiás)

Cruzeiro won 3–2 on aggregate and advanced to the round of 16.
