= Eduardo (footballer, born 1995) =

Brazilian footballer

Personal information
- Full name: Eduardo José da Rosa Milhomem
- Date of birth: 3 December 1995 (age 30)
- Place of birth: Brasília, Brazil
- Height: 1.88 m (6 ft 2 in)
- Position: Defender

Team information
- Current team: Gama

Youth career
- –2014: Gama

Senior career*
Years	Team	Apps	(Gls)
2015–	Gama		
2015	→ Legião (loan)		
- * Club domestic league appearances and goals as of 16 January 2017

Eduardo José da Rosa Milhomem (born December 3, 1995, in Brasília), commonly known as Eduardo or simply Dudu, is a Brazilian footballer who plays for Gama as defender. He already played for national competitions such as Copa do Brasil and Campeonato Brasileiro Série D.

== Career statistics ==
As of 19 January 2017

Club	Season	League			State League		Cup		Conmebol		Other		Total	
Club	Season	Division	Apps	Goals	Apps	Goals	Apps	Goals	Apps	Goals	Apps	Goals	Apps	Goals
Gama	2015	Série D	0	0	6	0	—		—		—		6	0
Gama	2016	Brasiliense	—		8	1	6	0	—		6 (Note: All appearance(s) in Copa Verde)	0	20	1
Gama	Subtotal		0	0	14	1	6	0	—		6	0	26	1
Career total			0	0	14	1	6	0	—		6	0	26	1
