= 2016 Copa do Nordeste =

Tournament details
- Country: Brazil
- Dates: 14 February – 1 May
- Teams: 20

Final positions
- Champions: Santa Cruz
- Runners-up: Campinense
- 2016 Copa Sudamericana: Santa Cruz
- 2017 Copa do Brasil: Santa Cruz

Tournament statistics
- Matches played: 74
- Goals scored: 179 (2.42 per match)
- Top goal scorer: Rodrigão (9 goals)

The 2016 Copa do Nordeste was the 14th edition of the main football tournament featuring teams from the Brazilian Northeast Region. The competition featured 20 clubs, with Bahia and Pernambuco having three seeds each, and Ceará, Rio Grande do Norte, Sergipe, Alagoas, Paraíba, Maranhão and Piauí with two seeds each. Santa Cruz (Pernambuco) qualified to play in the 2016 Copa Sudamericana, after winning the final against Campinense (Paraíba) 3–2 on aggregate.
Santa Cruz also qualified to play in the 2017 Copa Sudamericana but CONMEBOL reduced the Brazilian berths from 8 to 6. Therefore, the champions Santa Cruz (Copa do Nordeste) and Paysandu (Copa Verde) lost their Copa Sudamericana berths. Finally, they qualified for the 2017 Copa do Brasil Round of 16.
Ceará were the defending champion, but were eliminated by Santa Cruz in the quarterfinals.

== Qualified teams ==
Association	Team (Berth)	Entry stage
(Alagoas) Alagoas; 2 berths	CRB	2015 Campeonato Alagoano champions
(Alagoas) Alagoas; 2 berths	Coruripe	2015 Campeonato Alagoano runners-up
(Bahia) Bahia; 3 berths	Bahia	2015 Campeonato Baiano champions
(Bahia) Bahia; 3 berths	Vitória da Conquista	2015 Campeonato Baiano runners-up
(Bahia) Bahia; 3 berths	Juazeirense	2015 Campeonato Baiano 3rd place
(Ceará) Ceará; 2 berths	Fortaleza	2015 Campeonato Cearense champions
(Ceará) Ceará; 2 berths	Ceará	2015 Campeonato Cearense runners-up
(Maranhão) Maranhão; 2 berths	Imperatriz	2015 Campeonato Maranhense champions
(Maranhão) Maranhão; 2 berths	Sampaio Corrêa	2015 Campeonato Maranhense runners-up
(Paraíba) Paraíba; 2 berths	Campinense	2015 Campeonato Paraibano champions
(Paraíba) Paraíba; 2 berths	Botafogo-PB	2015 Campeonato Paraibano runners-up
(Pernambuco) Pernambuco; 3 berths	Santa Cruz	2015 Campeonato Pernambucano champions
(Pernambuco) Pernambuco; 3 berths	Salgueiro	2015 Campeonato Pernambucano runners-up
(Pernambuco) Pernambuco; 3 berths	Sport	2015 Campeonato Pernambucano 3rd place
(Piauí) Piauí; 2 berths	Ríver	2015 Campeonato Piauiense champions
(Piauí) Piauí; 2 berths	Flamengo-PI	2015 Campeonato Piauiense runners-up
(Rio Grande do Norte) Rio Grande do Norte; 2 berths	América de Natal	2015 Campeonato Potiguar champions
(Rio Grande do Norte) Rio Grande do Norte; 2 berths	ABC	2015 Campeonato Potiguar runners-up
(Sergipe) Sergipe; 2 berths	Confiança	2015 Campeonato Sergipano champions
(Sergipe) Sergipe; 2 berths	Estanciano	2015 Campeonato Sergipano runners-up

== Group stage ==
Key to colours in group tables
Advance to the Final stage

=== Group A ===
Pos	Team	Pld	W	D	L	GF	GA	GD	Pts
1	(Paraíba) Campinense	6	5	1	0	13	3	+10	16
2	(Pernambuco) Salgueiro	6	3	1	2	9	5	+4	10
3	(Rio Grande do Norte) ABC	6	1	1	4	6	13	−7	4
4	(Maranhão) Imperatriz	6	1	1	4	6	13	−7	4

Source:CBF

=== Group B ===
Pos	Team	Pld	W	D	L	GF	GA	GD	Pts
1	(Alagoas) CRB	6	3	1	2	8	5	+3	10
2	(Rio Grande do Norte) América de Natal	6	2	3	1	7	6	+1	9
3	(Alagoas) Coruripe	6	2	2	2	7	8	−1	8
4	(Sergipe) Estanciano	6	1	2	3	3	6	−3	5

Source:CBF

=== Group C ===
Pos	Team	Pld	W	D	L	GF	GA	GD	Pts
1	Bahia	6	6	0	0	12	2	+10	18
2	(Pernambuco) Santa Cruz	6	3	1	2	7	4	+3	10
4	(Sergipe) Confiança	6	1	1	4	4	11	−7	4
3	(Bahia) Juazeirense	6	0	2	4	4	10	−6	2

Source:CBF

=== Group D ===
Pos	Team	Pld	W	D	L	GF	GA	GD	Pts
1	(Pernambuco) Sport	6	3	2	1	12	8	+4	11
2	(Ceará) Fortaleza	6	3	1	2	9	7	+2	10
3	(Piauí) Ríver	6	1	3	2	8	10	−2	6
4	(Paraíba) Botafogo-PB	6	1	2	3	6	10	−4	5

Source:CBF

=== Group E ===
Pos	Team	Pld	W	D	L	GF	GA	GD	Pts
1	Ceará	6	4	1	1	13	4	+9	13
2	(Maranhão) Sampaio Corrêa	6	3	1	2	8	6	+2	10
3	(Bahia) Vitória da Conquista	6	3	1	2	6	4	+2	10
4	(Piauí) Flamengo-PI	6	0	1	5	1	14	−13	1

Source:CBF

=== Ranking of second placed teams ===
Pos	Team	Pld	W	D	L	GF	GA	GD	Pts
1	(Pernambuco) Salgueiro	6	3	1	2	9	5	+4	10
2	(Pernambuco) Santa Cruz	6	3	1	2	7	4	+3	10
3	(Ceará) Fortaleza	6	3	1	2	9	7	+2	10
4	(Maranhão) Sampaio Corrêa	6	3	1	2	8	6	+2	10
5	(Rio Grande do Norte) América de Natal	6	2	3	1	7	6	+1	9

== Knockout phase ==
=== Bracket ===
Quarter-finals
(Pernambuco) Santa Cruz	2	1	3
Ceará	1	0	1
(Ceará) Fortaleza	1	1	2
Bahia	2	1	3
(Alagoas) CRB	2	0	2
(Pernambuco) Sport (a)	1	1	2
(Pernambuco) Salgueiro	0	2	2
(Paraíba) Campinense	2	1	3

Semi-finals
(Pernambuco) Santa Cruz	2	1	3
Bahia	2	0	2
(Pernambuco) Sport	1	0	1 (1)
(Paraíba) Campinense (p)	0	1	1 (3)

Finals
(Pernambuco) Santa Cruz	2	1	3
(Paraíba) Campinense	1	1	2

=== Quarterfinals ===
Team 1	Agg.	Team 2	1st leg	2nd leg
Fortaleza (Ceará)	2–3	Bahia	1–2	1–1
Santa Cruz (Pernambuco)	3–1	Ceará	2–1	1–0
CRB (Alagoas)	2–2 (a)	(Pernambuco) Sport	2–1	0–1
Salgueiro (Pernambuco)	2–3	(Paraíba) Campinense	0–2	2–1

=== Semifinals ===
Team 1	Agg.	Team 2	1st leg	2nd leg
Santa Cruz (Pernambuco)	3–2	Bahia	2–2	1–0
Sport (Pernambuco)	1–1 (1–3 p)	(Paraíba) Campinense	1–0	0–1

=== Finals ===
27 April 2016
21:45

Santa Cruz (Pernambuco)	2–1	(Paraíba) Campinense
Grafite 29'; Bruno Moraes 90+2'	Report	Tiago Sala 71'

Estádio do Arruda, Recife
Attendance: 36,106
Referee: Arilson Bispo da Anunciação
Replaced by Nielson Nogueira Dias (16')

1 May 2016
16:00

Campinense (Paraíba)	1–1	(Pernambuco) Santa Cruz
Rodrigão 70'	Report	Arthur Caíke 78'

Estádio Governador Ernani Sátyro, Campina Grande
Attendance: 19,859
Referee: Jailson Macêdo Freitas

2016 Copa do Nordeste
Champions

Santa Cruz
1st title

== Top scorers ==
Rank	Player	Club	Goals
1	(Brazil) Rodrigão	Campinense	9
2	(Brazil) Hernane	Bahia	6
3	(Brazil) Grafite	Santa Cruz	5
3	(Brazil) Keno	Santa Cruz	5
5	(Brazil) Bill	Ceará	4
5	(Brazil) Juninho	Bahia	4
5	(Brazil) Neto Baiano	CRB	4
5	(Brazil) Piauí	Salgueiro	4
5	(Brazil) Rafael Costa	Ceará	4
