= 2017 Copa do Brasil =

Tournament details
- Country: Brazil
- Dates: February 8 – September 27
- Teams: 91

Final positions
- Champions: Cruzeiro (5th title)
- Runners-up: Flamengo

Tournament statistics
- Matches played: 120
- Goals scored: 282 (2.35 per match)
- Top goal scorer(s): Lucas Barrios; Brenner; Léo Gamalho; Rafael Sóbis (5 goals each)

Awards
- Best player: Diego (Flamengo)

The 2017 Copa do Brasil (officially the Copa Continental Pneus do Brasil 2017 for sponsorship reasons) was the 29th edition of the Copa do Brasil football competition. It was held between February 8 and September 27, 2017. The competition was contested by 91 teams, which qualified either by participating in their respective state championships (70), by the 2017 CBF ranking (10), by the 2016 Copa do Nordeste (1), by the 2016 Copa Verde (1), by the 2016 Série B (1) or qualified for the 2017 Copa Libertadores (8). Copa Verde, Copa do Nordeste and Série B champions, and the 8 Copa Libertadores clubs entered the competition in the round of 16.

Cruzeiro defeated Flamengo on penalties in the finals to win their fifth title. They also earned the right to play in the 2018 Copa Libertadores Group stage and the 2018 Copa do Brasil Round of 16. Diego (Flamengo) and Gatito Fernández (Botafogo) won best player and best goalkeeper awards, respectively.

Grêmio were the defending champions, but were eliminated by Cruzeiro in the semi-finals.

== Format ==
The competition was a single elimination knockout tournament, the first two rounds featuring a single match and the other rounds featuring two-legged ties. The winner qualified for the 2018 Copa Libertadores.

== Qualified teams ==
Teams in bold qualified directly for the round of 16.

Association	Team (Berth)	Qualification method
(Acre (state)) Acre; 2 berths	Atlético Acreano	2016 Campeonato Acriano champions
(Acre (state)) Acre; 2 berths	Rio Branco	2016 Campeonato Acriano runners-up
(Alagoas) Alagoas; 3+1 berths	CRB	2016 Campeonato Alagoano champions
(Alagoas) Alagoas; 3+1 berths	CSA	2016 Campeonato Alagoano runners-up
(Alagoas) Alagoas; 3+1 berths	Murici	2016 Campeonato Alagoano 3rd place
(Alagoas) Alagoas; 3+1 berths	ASA	9th best placed team in the 2016 CBF ranking not already qualified
(Amapá) Amapá; 1 berth	Santos	2016 Campeonato Amapaense champions
(Amazonas (Brazilian state)) Amazonas; 2 berths	Fast Clube	2016 Campeonato Amazonense champions
(Amazonas (Brazilian state)) Amazonas; 2 berths	Princesa do Solimões	2016 Campeonato Amazonense runners-up
(Bahia) Bahia; 3 berths	Vitória	2016 Campeonato Baiano champions
(Bahia) Bahia; 3 berths	Bahia	2016 Campeonato Baiano runners-up
(Bahia) Bahia; 3 berths	Vitória da Conquista	2016 Copa Governador da Bahia champions
(Ceará) Ceará; 3+1 berths	Fortaleza	2016 Campeonato Cearense champions
(Ceará) Ceará; 3+1 berths	Uniclinic	2016 Campeonato Cearense runners-up
(Ceará) Ceará; 3+1 berths	Guarani de Juazeiro	2016 Copa Fares Lopes champions
(Ceará) Ceará; 3+1 berths	Ceará	3rd best placed team in the 2016 CBF ranking not already qualified
Espírito Santo; 1 berth	Desportiva	2016 Campeonato Capixaba champions
(Federal District (Brazil)) Federal District; 2 berths	Luziânia	2016 Campeonato Brasiliense champions
(Federal District (Brazil)) Federal District; 2 berths	Ceilândia	2016 Campeonato Brasiliense runners-up
(Goiás) Goiás; 3 + 1 berths	**Atlético Goianiense**	**2016 Campeonato Brasileiro Série B champions**
(Goiás) Goiás; 3 + 1 berths	Goiás	2016 Campeonato Goiano champions
(Goiás) Goiás; 3 + 1 berths	Anápolis	2016 Campeonato Goiano runners-up
(Goiás) Goiás; 3 + 1 berths	Vila Nova	2016 Campeonato Goiano 4th place
(Maranhão) Maranhão; 2 berths	Moto Club	2016 Campeonato Maranhense champions
(Maranhão) Maranhão; 2 berths	Sampaio Corrêa	2016 Campeonato Maranhense runners-up
(Mato Grosso) Mato Grosso; 3 berths	Luverdense	2016 Campeonato Mato-Grossense champions
(Mato Grosso) Mato Grosso; 3 berths	Sinop	2016 Campeonato Mato-Grossense runners-up
(Mato Grosso) Mato Grosso; 3 berths	Cuiabá	2016 Copa FMF champions
Mato Grosso do Sul 2 berths	Sete de Dourados	2016 Campeonato Sul-Mato-Grossense champions
Mato Grosso do Sul 2 berths	Comercial	2016 Campeonato Sul-Mato-Grossense runners-up
Minas Gerais; 4+1+1 berths	**Atlético Mineiro**	**2016 Campeonato Brasileiro Série A 4th place**
Minas Gerais; 4+1+1 berths	América Mineiro	2016 Campeonato Mineiro champions
Minas Gerais; 4+1+1 berths	Cruzeiro	2016 Campeonato Mineiro 3rd place
Minas Gerais; 4+1+1 berths	URT	2016 Campeonato Mineiro 4th place
Minas Gerais; 4+1+1 berths	Caldense	2016 Campeonato Mineiro 5th place
Minas Gerais; 4+1+1 berths	Boa Esporte	7th best placed team in the 2016 CBF ranking not already qualified
(Pará) Pará; 3 + 1 berths	**Paysandu**	**2016 Copa Verde champions**
(Pará) Pará; 3 + 1 berths	São Francisco	2016 Campeonato Paraense runners-up
(Pará) Pará; 3 + 1 berths	São Raimundo	2016 Campeonato Paraense 3rd place
(Pará) Pará; 3 + 1 berths	Remo	2016 Campeonato Paraense 4th place
(Paraíba) Paraíba; 2 berths	Campinense	2016 Campeonato Paraibano champions
(Paraíba) Paraíba; 2 berths	Botafogo	2016 Campeonato Paraibano runners-up
(Paraná (state)) Paraná; 3+1+1 berths	**Atlético Paranaense**	**2016 Campeonato Brasileiro Série A 6th place**
(Paraná (state)) Paraná; 3+1+1 berths	Coritiba	2016 Campeonato Paranaense runners-up
(Paraná (state)) Paraná; 3+1+1 berths	Paraná	2016 Campeonato Paranaense 3rd place
(Paraná (state)) Paraná; 3+1+1 berths	PSTC	2016 Campeonato Paranaense 4th place
(Paraná (state)) Paraná; 3+1+1 berths	Londrina	10th best placed team in the 2016 CBF ranking not already qualified
(Pernambuco) Pernambuco; 3 + 1 berths	**Santa Cruz**	**2016 Copa do Nordeste champions**
(Pernambuco) Pernambuco; 3 + 1 berths	Sport	2016 Campeonato Pernambucano runners-up
(Pernambuco) Pernambuco; 3 + 1 berths	Náutico	2016 Campeonato Pernambucano 3rd place
(Pernambuco) Pernambuco; 3 + 1 berths	Salgueiro	2016 Campeonato Pernambucano 4th place
(Piauí) Piauí; 2 berths	Ríver	2016 Campeonato Piauiense champions
(Piauí) Piauí; 2 berths	Altos	2016 Campeonato Piauiense runners-up
(Rio de Janeiro (state)) Rio de Janeiro; 5 + 2 berths	**Flamengo**	**2016 Campeonato Brasileiro Série A 3rd place**
(Rio de Janeiro (state)) Rio de Janeiro; 5 + 2 berths	**Botafogo**	**2016 Campeonato Brasileiro Série A 5th place**
(Rio de Janeiro (state)) Rio de Janeiro; 5 + 2 berths	Vasco da Gama	2016 Campeonato Carioca champions
(Rio de Janeiro (state)) Rio de Janeiro; 5 + 2 berths	Fluminense	2016 Campeonato Carioca 3rd place
(Rio de Janeiro (state)) Rio de Janeiro; 5 + 2 berths	Volta Redonda	2016 Campeonato Carioca 5th place
(Rio de Janeiro (state)) Rio de Janeiro; 5 + 2 berths	Boavista	2016 Campeonato Carioca 6th place
(Rio de Janeiro (state)) Rio de Janeiro; 5 + 2 berths	Friburguense	2016 Copa Rio runners-up
Rio Grande do Norte 3 berths	ABC	2016 Campeonato Potiguar champions
Rio Grande do Norte 3 berths	América de Natal	2016 Campeonato Potiguar runners-up
Rio Grande do Norte 3 berths	Globo	2016 Campeonato Potiguar 3rd place
(Rio Grande do Sul) Rio Grande do Sul; 4 + 1 berths	**Grêmio**	**2016 Copa do Brasil champions**
(Rio Grande do Sul) Rio Grande do Sul; 4 + 1 berths	Internacional	2016 Campeonato Gaúcho champions
(Rio Grande do Sul) Rio Grande do Sul; 4 + 1 berths	Juventude	2016 Campeonato Gaúcho runners-up
(Rio Grande do Sul) Rio Grande do Sul; 4 + 1 berths	São José	2016 Campeonato Gaúcho 4th place
(Rio Grande do Sul) Rio Grande do Sul; 4 + 1 berths	Ypiranga	2016 Copa FGF runners-up
(Rondônia) Rondônia; 1 berth	Rondoniense	2016 Campeonato Rondoniense champions
(Roraima) Roraima; 1 berth	São Raimundo	2016 Campeonato Roraimense champions
(Santa Catarina (state)) Santa Catarina; 4 + 1 + 1 berths	**Chapecoense**	**2016 Copa Sudamericana champions**
(Santa Catarina (state)) Santa Catarina; 4 + 1 + 1 berths	Joinville	2016 Campeonato Catarinense runners-up
(Santa Catarina (state)) Santa Catarina; 4 + 1 + 1 berths	Criciúma	2016 Campeonato Catarinense 3rd place
(Santa Catarina (state)) Santa Catarina; 4 + 1 + 1 berths	Figueirense	2016 Campeonato Catarinense 4th place
(Santa Catarina (state)) Santa Catarina; 4 + 1 + 1 berths	Brusque	2016 Campeonato Catarinense 5th place
(Santa Catarina (state)) Santa Catarina; 4 + 1 + 1 berths	Avaí	4th best placed team in the 2016 CBF ranking not already qualified
(São Paulo (state)) São Paulo; 5+2+5 berths	**Palmeiras**	**2016 Campeonato Brasileiro Série A champions**
(São Paulo (state)) São Paulo; 5+2+5 berths	**Santos**	**2016 Campeonato Brasileiro Série A runners-up**
(São Paulo (state)) São Paulo; 5+2+5 berths	Audax	2016 Campeonato Paulista runners-up
(São Paulo (state)) São Paulo; 5+2+5 berths	Corinthians	2016 Campeonato Paulista 3rd place
(São Paulo (state)) São Paulo; 5+2+5 berths	São Bento	2016 Campeonato Paulista 5th place
(São Paulo (state)) São Paulo; 5+2+5 berths	Santo André	2016 Campeonato Paulista Série A2 champions
(São Paulo (state)) São Paulo; 5+2+5 berths	Ferroviária	2016 Copa Paulista runners-up
(São Paulo (state)) São Paulo; 5+2+5 berths	São Paulo	best placed team in the 2016 CBF ranking not already qualified
(São Paulo (state)) São Paulo; 5+2+5 berths	Ponte Preta	2nd best placed team in the 2016 CBF ranking not already qualified
(São Paulo (state)) São Paulo; 5+2+5 berths	Bragantino	5th best placed team in the 2016 CBF ranking not already qualified
(São Paulo (state)) São Paulo; 5+2+5 berths	Portuguesa	6th best placed team in the 2016 CBF ranking not already qualified
(São Paulo (state)) São Paulo; 5+2+5 berths	Oeste	8th best placed team in the 2016 CBF ranking not already qualified
(Sergipe) Sergipe; 2 berths	Sergipe	2016 Campeonato Sergipano champions
(Sergipe) Sergipe; 2 berths	Itabaiana	2016 Campeonato Sergipano runners-up
(Tocantins) Tocantins; 1 berth	Gurupi	2016 Campeonato Tocantinense champions

== Draw ==
A draw for the first round was held by CBF on December 15, 2016, 11:00 BRST at CBF headquarters in Rio de Janeiro. The 80 qualified teams were divided in eight groups (A-H) with 10 teams each. That division was based on the 2017 CBF ranking and the matches were drawn from the respective confronts: A vs. E; B vs. F; C vs. G; D vs. H. The lower ranked teams hosted the first round match.

=== Seeding ===
- 2017 CBF ranking shown in brackets.

Group A	Group B	Group C	Group D
(São Paulo (state)) Corinthians (4); (Minas Gerais) Cruzeiro (6); (Rio Grande do Sul) Internacional (7); (São Paulo (state)) São Paulo (8); (Rio de Janeiro (state)) Fluminense (10); (Rio de Janeiro (state)) Vasco da Gama (13); (Paraná (state)) Coritiba (14); (São Paulo (state)) Ponte Preta (15); (Santa Catarina (state)) Figueirense (16); (Pernambuco) Sport (17)	Goiás (18); (Bahia) Vitória (20); Bahia (21); (Minas Gerais) América Mineiro (22); Ceará (23); (Santa Catarina (state)) Avaí (24); (Santa Catarina (state)) Criciúma (25); (Santa Catarina (state)) Joinville (28); (Pernambuco) Náutico (29); (Rio Grande do Norte) ABC (31)	(São Paulo (state)) Bragantino (32); (Paraná (state)) Paraná (33); (Rio Grande do Norte) América de Natal (34); (Mato Grosso) Luverdense (35); (Maranhão) Sampaio Corrêa (36); (Alagoas) CRB (37); (Rio Grande do Sul) Juventude (38); (São Paulo (state)) Portuguesa (39); (Ceará) Fortaleza (40); (Minas Gerais) Boa Esporte (41)	(São Paulo (state)) Oeste (42); (Alagoas) ASA (43); (Goiás) Vila Nova (44); (Paraná (state)) Londrina (45); (Paraíba) Botafogo (46); (Pernambuco) Salgueiro (49); (Mato Grosso) Cuiabá (52); (Pará) Remo (57); (Rio Grande do Sul) Ypiranga (62); (Piauí) Ríver (65)
Group E	Group F	Group G	Group H
(Acre (state)) Rio Branco (67); (Paraíba) Campinense (71); (Amapá) Santos (72); (Rio Grande do Norte) Globo (77); (Amazonas (Brazilian state)) Princesa do Solimões (78); (Minas Gerais) Caldense (81); (Rio de Janeiro (state)) Volta Redonda (82); (Maranhão) Moto Club (88); (Bahia) Vitória da Conquista (89); (Alagoas) CSA (90)	(Rio de Janeiro (state)) Boavista (96); (Acre (state)) Atlético Acreano (99); (Mato Grosso do Sul) Comercial (103); (Federal District (Brazil)) Luziânia (104); (Ceará) Guarani de Juazeiro (108); Sergipe (114); (Sergipe) Itabaiana (117); (Federal District (Brazil)) Ceilândia (118); (São Paulo (state)) Santo André (119); (Espírito Santo) Desportiva (124)	(São Paulo (state)) São Bento (128); (Alagoas) Murici (130); (Piauí) Altos (136); (Roraima) São Raimundo (138); (Goiás) Anápolis (140); (Minas Gerais) URT (142); (Pará) São Raimundo (143); (Ceará) Uniclinic (146); (São Paulo (state)) Audax (148); (Rio Grande do Sul) São José (148)	(Santa Catarina (state)) Brusque (148); (Paraná (state)) PSTC (148); (Rondônia) Rondoniense (148); (Pará) São Francisco (148); (Mato Grosso do Sul) Sete de Dourados (148); (Mato Grosso) Sinop (148); (São Paulo (state)) Ferroviária (164); (Tocantins) Gurupi (168); (Rio de Janeiro (state)) Friburguense (207); (Amazonas (Brazilian state)) Fast Clube (217)

== First round ==
In the first round, each match was played on a single-legged basis. The lower ranked team hosted the match and, in tie cases, the higher ranked team advanced to next round.

Team 1	Score	Team 2
CSA (Alagoas)	1–4	(Pernambuco) Sport
Sete de Dourados (Mato Grosso do Sul)	1–0	(Piauí) Ríver
Uniclinic (Ceará)	1–2	(São Paulo (state)) Portuguesa
Boavista (Rio de Janeiro (state))	1–0	Ceará
Rio Branco (Acre (state))	1–0	(Santa Catarina (state)) Figueirense
Gurupi (Tocantins)	2–1	(Paraná (state)) Londrina
São Raimundo (Pará)	2–1	(Ceará) Fortaleza
Comercial (Mato Grosso do Sul)	0–1	(Santa Catarina (state)) Joinville
Volta Redonda (Rio de Janeiro (state))	1–2	(Minas Gerais) Cruzeiro
São Francisco (Pará)	3–0	(Paraíba) Botafogo
Murici (Alagoas)	3–1	(Rio Grande do Sul) Juventude
Atlético Acreano (Acre (state))	0–2	(Minas Gerais) América Mineiro
Globo (Rio Grande do Norte)	2–5	(Rio de Janeiro (state)) Fluminense
Sinop (Mato Grosso)	1–0	(Pernambuco) Salgueiro
Altos (Piauí)	2–0	(Alagoas) CRB
Santo André (São Paulo (state))	0–1	(Santa Catarina (state)) Criciúma
Princesa do Solimões (Amazonas (Brazilian state))	0–2	(Rio Grande do Sul) Internacional
Friburguense (Rio de Janeiro (state))	0–1	(São Paulo (state)) Oeste
São José (Rio Grande do Sul)	1–1	(Maranhão) Sampaio Corrêa
Guarani de Juazeiro (Ceará)	1–0	(Pernambuco) Náutico
Caldense (Minas Gerais)	0–1	(São Paulo (state)) Corinthians
Brusque (Santa Catarina (state))	2–1	(Pará) Remo
URT (Minas Gerais)	1–2	(Mato Grosso) Luverdense
Desportiva (Espírito Santo)	1–2	(Santa Catarina (state)) Avaí
Campinense (Paraíba)	0–2	(São Paulo (state)) Ponte Preta
Rondoniense (Rondônia)	0–2	(Mato Grosso) Cuiabá
São Raimundo (Roraima)	0–2	(Minas Gerais) Boa Esporte
Itabaiana (Sergipe)	2–4	Goiás
Santos (Amapá)	0–2	(Rio de Janeiro (state)) Vasco da Gama
Fast Clube (Amazonas (Brazilian state))	1–1	(Goiás) Vila Nova
Anápolis (Goiás)	0–0	(São Paulo (state)) Bragantino
Luziânia (Federal District (Brazil))	0–2	(Bahia) Vitória
Vitória da Conquista (Bahia)	1–1	(Paraná (state)) Coritiba
Ferroviária (São Paulo (state))	1–1	(Alagoas) ASA
São Bento (São Paulo (state))	1–1	(Paraná (state)) Paraná
Sergipe	0–2	Bahia
Moto Club (Maranhão)	0–1	(São Paulo (state)) São Paulo
PSTC (Paraná (state))	2–1	(Rio Grande do Sul) Ypiranga
Audax (São Paulo (state))	1–0	(Rio Grande do Norte) América de Natal
Ceilândia (Federal District (Brazil))	1–1	(Rio Grande do Norte) ABC

== Second round ==
In the second round, each match was played on a single-legged basis. In case of tie, the qualified team was determined by penalty shoot-out.

Team 1	Score	Team 2
Sport (Pernambuco)	3–0	(Mato Grosso do Sul) Sete de Dourados
Portuguesa (São Paulo (state))	0–2	(Rio de Janeiro (state)) Boavista
Gurupi (Tocantins)	2–0	(Acre (state)) Rio Branco
Joinville (Santa Catarina (state))	1–0	(Pará) São Raimundo
Cruzeiro (Minas Gerais)	6–0	(Pará) São Francisco
Murici (Alagoas)	0–0 (5–4 p)	(Minas Gerais) América Mineiro
Sinop (Mato Grosso)	1–3	(Rio de Janeiro (state)) Fluminense
Criciúma (Santa Catarina (state))	2–2 (4–3 p)	(Piauí) Altos
Internacional (Rio Grande do Sul)	4–1	(São Paulo (state)) Oeste
Sampaio Corrêa (Maranhão)	2–0	(Ceará) Guarani de Juazeiro
Brusque (Santa Catarina (state))	0–0 (4–5 p)	(São Paulo (state)) Corinthians
Avaí (Santa Catarina (state))	1–1 (2–3 p)	(Mato Grosso) Luverdense
Ponte Preta (São Paulo (state))	1–1 (4–5 p)	(Mato Grosso) Cuiabá
Boa Esporte (Minas Gerais)	0–0 (2–3 p)	Goiás
Vila Nova (Goiás)	1–2	(Rio de Janeiro (state)) Vasco da Gama
Vitória (Bahia)	3–2	(São Paulo (state)) Bragantino
Coritiba (Paraná (state))	0–2	(Alagoas) ASA
Paraná (Paraná (state))	2–0	Bahia
PSTC (Paraná (state))	2–4	(São Paulo (state)) São Paulo
ABC (Rio Grande do Norte)	1–1 (4–1 p)	(São Paulo (state)) Audax

== Third round ==
In the third round, each match was played on a home-and-away two-legged basis. If tied on aggregate, the away goals rule would be used. If still tied, extra time would not be played, and the penalty shoot-out would be used to determine the winner.

Team 1	Agg.	Team 2	1st leg	2nd leg
Boavista (Rio de Janeiro (state))	0–4	(Pernambuco) Sport	0–3	0–1
Joinville (Santa Catarina (state))	3–2	(Tocantins) Gurupi	3–1	0–1
Murici (Alagoas)	0–5	(Minas Gerais) Cruzeiro	0–2	0–3
Criciúma (Santa Catarina (state))	3–4	(Rio de Janeiro (state)) Fluminense	1–1	2–3
Sampaio Corrêa (Maranhão)	1–7	(Rio Grande do Sul) Internacional	1–4	0–3
Luverdense (Mato Grosso)	1–3	(São Paulo (state)) Corinthians	0–2	1–1
Goiás	5–1	(Mato Grosso) Cuiabá	4–0	1–1
Vasco da Gama (Rio de Janeiro (state))	1–2	(Bahia) Vitória	1–1	0–1
ASA (Alagoas)	0–0 (1–4 p)	(Paraná (state)) Paraná	0–0	0–0
São Paulo (São Paulo (state))	4–2	(Rio Grande do Norte) ABC	3–1	1–1

== Fourth round ==
A draw for the fourth round was held by CBF on March 17, 2017. In the fourth round, each match was played on a home-and-away two-legged basis. If tied on aggregate, the away goals rule would be used. If still tied, extra time would not be played, and the penalty shoot-out would be used to determine the winner.

Team 1	Agg.	Team 2	1st leg	2nd leg
Sport (Pernambuco)	3–3 (4–3 p)	(Santa Catarina (state)) Joinville	2–1	1–2
Vitória (Bahia)	0–2	(Paraná (state)) Paraná	0–2	0–0
Goiás	2–4	(Rio de Janeiro (state)) Fluminense	2–1	0–3
Internacional (Rio Grande do Sul)	2–2 (4–3 p)	(São Paulo (state)) Corinthians	1–1	1–1
São Paulo (São Paulo (state))	2–3	(Minas Gerais) Cruzeiro	0–2	2–1

== Knockout stages ==
In the knockout stages, the 16 teams played a single-elimination tournament, with the following rules:

- Each tie was played on a home-and-away two-legged basis.
- In the round of 16, quarter-finals, and semi-finals, if tied on aggregate, the away goals rule would be used. If still tied, extra time would not be played, and the penalty shoot-out would be used to determine the winner.
- In the final, if tied on aggregate, the away goals rule and extra time would not be used and the penalty shoot-out would be used to determine the winner.

=== Bracket ===
Round of 16
(Paraná (state)) Paraná	3	0	3
(Minas Gerais) Atlético Mineiro	2	2	4
(Rio de Janeiro (state)) Botafogo	2	1	3
(Pernambuco) Sport	1	1	2
(Rio de Janeiro (state)) Flamengo	0	2	2
(Goiás) Atlético Goianiense	0	1	1
(São Paulo (state)) Santos	2	3	5
(Pará) Paysandu	0	1	1
(Rio Grande do Sul) Grêmio	3	2	5
(Rio de Janeiro (state)) Fluminense	1	0	1
(Pernambuco) Santa Cruz	0	0	0
(Paraná (state)) Atlético Paranaense	0	2	2
(São Paulo (state)) Palmeiras (a)	1	1	2
(Rio Grande do Sul) Internacional	0	2	2
(Minas Gerais) Cruzeiro	1	0	1
(Santa Catarina (state)) Chapecoense	0	0	0

Quarter-finals
(Minas Gerais) Atlético Mineiro	1	0	1
(Rio de Janeiro (state)) Botafogo	0	3	3
(Rio de Janeiro (state)) Flamengo (a)	2	2	4
(São Paulo (state)) Santos	0	4	4
(Rio Grande do Sul) Grêmio	4	3	7
(Paraná (state)) Atlético Paranaense	0	2	2
(São Paulo (state)) Palmeiras	3	1	4
(Minas Gerais) Cruzeiro (a)	3	1	4

Semi-finals
(Rio de Janeiro (state)) Botafogo	0	0	0
(Rio de Janeiro (state)) Flamengo	0	1	1
(Rio Grande do Sul) Grêmio	1	0	1 (2)
(Minas Gerais) Cruzeiro (p)	0	1	1 (3)

Final
(Rio de Janeiro (state)) Flamengo	1	0	1 (3)
(Minas Gerais) Cruzeiro (p)	1	0	1 (5)

=== Round of 16 ===
A draw for the round of 16 was held by CBF on April 20, 2017.

Team 1	Agg.	Team 2	1st leg	2nd leg
Santa Cruz (Pernambuco)	0–2	(Paraná (state)) Atlético Paranaense	0–0	0–2
Grêmio (Rio Grande do Sul)	5–1	(Rio de Janeiro (state)) Fluminense	3–1	2–0
Flamengo (Rio de Janeiro (state))	2–1	(Goiás) Atlético Goianiense	0–0	2–1
Palmeiras (São Paulo (state))	2–2 (a)	(Rio Grande do Sul) Internacional	1–0	1–2
Botafogo (Rio de Janeiro (state))	3–2	(Pernambuco) Sport	2–1	1–1
Santos (São Paulo (state))	5–1	(Pará) Paysandu	2–0	3–1
Cruzeiro (Minas Gerais)	1–0	(Santa Catarina (state)) Chapecoense	1–0	0–0
Paraná (Paraná (state))	3–4	(Minas Gerais) Atlético Mineiro	3–2	0–2

=== Quarter-finals ===
A draw for the quarter-finals was held by CBF on June 5, 2017.

Team 1	Agg.	Team 2	1st leg	2nd leg
Atlético Mineiro (Minas Gerais)	1–3	(Rio de Janeiro (state)) Botafogo	1–0	0–3
Flamengo (Rio de Janeiro (state))	4–4 (a)	(São Paulo (state)) Santos	2–0	2–4
Grêmio (Rio Grande do Sul)	7–2	(Paraná (state)) Atlético Paranaense	4–0	3–2
Palmeiras (São Paulo (state))	4–4 (a)	(Minas Gerais) Cruzeiro	3–3	1–1

=== Semi-finals ===
A draw for the semi-finals was held by CBF on July 31, 2017.

Team 1	Agg.	Team 2	1st leg	2nd leg
Botafogo (Rio de Janeiro (state))	0–1	(Rio de Janeiro (state)) Flamengo	0–0	0–1
Grêmio (Rio Grande do Sul)	1–1 (2–3 p)	(Minas Gerais) Cruzeiro	1–0	0–1

=== Final ===
In the final, if tied on aggregate, the away goals rule and extra time would not be used and the penalty shoot-out would be used to determine the winner. (Regulations Article 12.c). A draw by CBF was held on August 24, 2017 to determine the home-and-away team for each leg. The first leg was played on September 7 and the second leg was played on September 27, 2017.

September 7, 2017
21:45 UTC−03:00

Flamengo (Rio de Janeiro (state))	1–1	(Minas Gerais) Cruzeiro
Lucas Paquetá 75'	Report	De Arrascaeta 83'

Maracanã, Rio de Janeiro
Attendance: 66,165
Referee: Marcelo Aparecido Ribeiro de Souza (São Paulo)

September 27, 2017
21:45 UTC−03:00

Cruzeiro (Minas Gerais)	0–0	(Rio de Janeiro (state)) Flamengo
	Report
Penalties
Henrique (penalty scored); Léo (penalty scored); Hudson (penalty scored); Diogo Barbosa (penalty scored); Thiago Neves (penalty scored)	5–3	(penalty scored) Guerrero; (penalty scored) Juan; (penalty missed) Diego; (penalty scored) Trauco

Mineirão, Belo Horizonte
Attendance: 61,017
Referee: Luiz Flávio de Oliveira (São Paulo)

2017 Copa do Brasil Champions
Cruzeiro
5th Title

== Top goalscorers ==
Rank	Player	Team	Goals
1	(Paraguay) Lucas Barrios	(Rio Grande do Sul) Grêmio	5
1	(Brazil) Brenner	(Rio Grande do Sul) Internacional	5
1	(Brazil) Léo Gamalho	Goiás	5
1	(Brazil) Rafael Sóbis	(Minas Gerais) Cruzeiro	5
5	(Brazil) Bruno Henrique	(São Paulo (state)) Santos	4
5	(Brazil) Henrique Dourado	(Rio de Janeiro (state)) Fluminense	4
7	(Brazil) Aldair	(Santa Catarina (state)) Joinville	3
7	(Brazil) Carlos	(Rio Grande do Sul) Internacional	3
7	(Brazil) Cícero	(São Paulo (state)) São Paulo	3
7	(Colombia) Jonathan Copete	(São Paulo (state)) Santos	3
7	(Brazil) Ederson	(Tocantins) Gurupi	3
7	(Brazil) Guilherme Biteco	(Paraná (state)) Paraná	3
7	(Brazil) Leandro Pereira	(Pernambuco) Sport	3
7	(Brazil) Nenê	(Rio de Janeiro (state)) Vasco da Gama	3
7	(Brazil) Pedro Rocha	(Rio Grande do Sul) Grêmio	3
7	(Brazil) Robinho	(Minas Gerais) Cruzeiro	3
7	(Ecuador) Junior Sornoza	(Rio de Janeiro (state)) Fluminense	3

Source: CBF
