= Estádio Raimundo Ribeiro de Souza =

Soccer stadium in Roraima

Coordinates: 2.8188°N 60.7209°W

The Estádio Raimundo Ribeiro de Souza, known as the Ribeirão, is a football stadium located in the city of Boa Vista, Roraima, Brazil. The stadium is owned by the Roraima state government and has a capacity of 3,000.
