= Gualberto (footballer) =

Brazilian footballer (born 1990)

Personal information
- Full name: Gualberto Luiz da Silva Júnior
- Date of birth: 8 April 1990 (age 36)
- Place of birth: Campinas, Brazil
- Height: 1.88 m (6 ft 2 in)
- Position: Centre back

Youth career
- 2004–009: Palmeiras

Senior career*
Years	Team	Apps	(Gls)
2009–2013	Palmeiras B		
2010–2013	Palmeiras	7	(0)
2011	→ ABC (loan)	1	(0)
2012	→ Oeste (loan)	6	(0)
2013–2018	Penapolense	36	(1)
2013	→ América Mineiro (loan)	15	(0)
2014	→ Criciúma (loan)	14	(0)
2015–2016	→ Paysandu (loan)	40	(2)
2017	→ Paysandu (loan)	9	(0)
2018	Joinville	11	(0)
2018	Nacional	0	(0)
2018–2019	Ferroviária	1	(0)
2019–2020	Ituano	0	(0)
2020	Portuguesa Santista	6	(0)
2021–2022	São Paulo Crystal	7	(0)
- * Club domestic league appearances and goals as of 4 June 2022

Gualberto Luís da Silva Júnior or simply Gualberto (born 8 April 1990) is a Brazilian centre back.

== Career ==
Gualberto made his debut for Palmeiras as a second-half substitute in a Campeonato Paulista 2010 match against Mogi Mirim on 16 January 2010.
