= 2016 Copa Verde =

Tournament details
- Country: Brazil
- Dates: 6 February – 10 May
- Teams: 18

Final positions
- Champions: (Pará) Paysandu (1st title)
- Runners-up: (Federal District (Brazil)) Gama

Tournament statistics
- Matches played: 33
- Goals scored: 86 (2.61 per match)
- Top goal scorer(s): (Brazil) Rafael Grampola (6 goals)

The 2016 Copa Verde was the third edition of the Copa Verde football competition held in Brazil. Featuring 18 clubs, Amazonas and Distrito Federal has two vacancies; Acre, Amapá, Espírito Santo, Goiás, Mato Grosso, Mato Grosso do Sul, Pará, Rondônia, Roraima and Tocantins with one each. The others four berths was set according to CBF ranking.

In the finals, Paysandu defeated Gama 3–2 on aggregate to win their first title and a place in the Round of 16 of the 2017 Copa do Brasil.

== Qualified teams ==
Association	Team	Qualification method
(Acre (state)) Acre; 1 berth	Rio Branco	2015 Campeonato Acreano champions
(Amapá) Amapá; 1 berth	Santos	2015 Campeonato Amapaense champions
(Amazonas (Brazilian state)) Amazonas; 2 berths	Nacional	2015 Campeonato Amazonense champions
(Amazonas (Brazilian state)) Amazonas; 2 berths	Fast Clube	2015 Copa Amazonas champions
(Federal District (Brazil)) Distrito Federal; 2 berths	Gama	2015 Campeonato Brasiliense champions
(Federal District (Brazil)) Distrito Federal; 2 berths	Brasília	2015 Campeonato Brasiliense runners-up
(Espírito Santo) Espírito Santo; 1 berth	Espírito Santo	2015 Copa Espírito Santo champions
(Goiás) Goiás; 1+1 berths	Aparecidense	2015 Campeonato Goiano runners-up
(Goiás) Goiás; 1+1 berths	Vila Nova	3rd best placed team in the 2016 CBF ranking not already qualified
(Mato Grosso) Mato Grosso; 1+1 berths	Cuiabá	2015 Campeonato Mato-Grossense champions
(Mato Grosso) Mato Grosso; 1+1 berths	Luverdense	2nd best placed team in the 2016 CBF ranking not already qualified
(Mato Grosso do Sul) Mato Grosso do Sul; 1 berth	Comercial	2015 Campeonato Sul-Mato-Grossense champions
(Pará) Pará; 1+2 berths	Remo	2015 Campeonato Paraense champions
(Pará) Pará; 1+2 berths	Paysandu	1st best placed team in the 2016 CBF ranking not already qualified
(Pará) Pará; 1+2 berths	Águia de Marabá	4th best placed team in the 2016 CBF ranking not already qualified
(Rondônia) Rondônia; 1 berth	Genus	2015 Campeonato Rondoniense 2nd round champions
(Roraima) Roraima; 1 berth	Náutico	2015 Campeonato Roraimense champions
(Tocantins) Tocantins; 1 berth	Interporto	2015 Campeonato Tocantinense runners-up

== Schedule ==
The schedule of the competition is as follows.

Stage	First leg	Second leg
Preliminary round	6 and 18 February 2016	17 February and 3 March 2016
Round of 16	9, 10 and 24 March 2016	16, 17 and 27 March 2016
Quarter-finals	23 and 24 March and 7 April 2016	6, 7, 13 and 14 April 2016
Semi-finals	20 April 2016	23 April 2016
Finals	3 May 2016	10 May 2016

== Preliminary round ==
Team 1	Agg.	Team 2	1st leg	2nd leg
Fast Clube (Amazonas (Brazilian state))	0–4	(Pará) Águia de Marabá	0–1	0–3
Brasília (Federal District (Brazil))	1–2	(Goiás) Vila Nova	1–1	0–1

== Bracket ==
Round of 16
(Amazonas (Brazilian state)) Fast Clube	1	0	1
(Pará) Paysandu	1	3	4
(Rondônia) Genus	2	—	—
(Acre (state)) Rio Branco	1	—	—
(Amapá) Santos	3	2	5
(Amazonas (Brazilian state)) Nacional	3	4	7
(Roraima) Náutico	1	0	1
(Pará) Remo	3	4	7
(Mato Grosso do Sul) Comercial	0	0	0
(Mato Grosso) Cuiabá	0	2	2
Espírito Santo	0	0	0
(Goiás) Aparecidense	0	2	2
(Goiás) Vila Nova	4	1	5
(Mato Grosso) Luverdense	0	0	0
(Tocantins) Interporto	1	0	1
(Federal District (Brazil)) Gama	1	3	4

Quarter-finals
(Pará) Paysandu	1	5	6
(Acre (state)) Rio Branco	0	2	2
(Amazonas (Brazilian state)) Nacional	1	0	1
(Pará) Remo	1	1	2
(Mato Grosso) Cuiabá	1	1	2
(Goiás) Aparecidense	3	0	3
(Goiás) Vila Nova	0	0	0 (3)
(Federal District (Brazil)) Gama (p)	0	0	0 (4)

Semi-finals
(Pará) Paysandu	2	4	6
(Pará) Remo	1	2	3
(Goiás) Aparecidense	1	2	3
(Federal District (Brazil)) Gama	3	1	4

Finals
(Pará) Paysandu	2	1	3
(Federal District (Brazil)) Gama	0	2	2

== Finals ==
3 May 2016
20:30 BRT (UTC−3)

Paysandu (Pará)	2–0	(Federal District (Brazil)) Gama
Celsinho 9'; Leandro Cearense 90+4'	Report

Mangueirão, Belém
Attendance: 24,160
Referee: Alisson Sidnei Furtado

10 May 2016
20:30 BRT (UTC−3)

Gama (Federal District (Brazil))	2–1	(Pará) Paysandu
Rafael Grampola 73', 78' (pen.)	Report	Raí 3'

Bezerrão, Gama
Attendance: 9,090
Referee: Elmo Alves Resende Cunha

Paysandu won 3–2 on aggregate.
