= Rafael Grampola =

Brazilian footballer (born 1988)

Personal information
- Full name: Rafael Santiago Gonçalves
- Date of birth: 9 April 1988 (age 38)
- Place of birth: Nova Granada, Brazil
- Height: 1.82 m (6 ft 0 in)
- Position: Forward

Team information
- Current team: Juventude

Youth career
- 2005–2008: Rio Preto

Senior career*
| Years | Team | Apps | (Gls) |
| 2009 | Ipatinga | 1 | (0) |
| 2010 | Atlético Sorocaba | 0 | (0) |
| 2010 | Caxias do Sul | 0 | (0) |
| 2011 | Sergipe | 0 | (0) |
| 2011–2012 | Bahia | 0 | (0) |
| 2012 | → Monte Azul (loan) | 0 | (0) |
| 2013 | Anápolis | 0 | (0) |
| 2013 | → ASEEV (loan) | 0 | (0) |
| 2013 | → Canedense (loan) | 0 | (0) |
| 2014 | Zacatepec | 8 | (0) |
| 2015–2016 | Gama | 28 | (13) |
| 2016–2017 | Bragantino | 39 | (14) |
| 2017–2019 | Joinville | 59 | (28) |
| 2018 | → Paraná (loan) | 18 | (1) |
| 2019 | Brasil de Pelotas | 13 | (2) |
| 2019–2020 | Dibba Al-Hisn | 3 | (0) |
| 2020– | Juventude | 0 | (0) |
- * Club domestic league appearances and goals as of 08:48, 20 June 2019 (UTC)

Rafael Santiago Gonçalves, commonly known as Rafael Grampola is a Brazilian footballer who plays as a forward for Juventude.

== Career ==
=== Early career ===
Rafael Grampola was still an u-20 player with Rio Preto when he played his first competitive games in the 2008 Copa Paulista. After scoring ten goals in the competition, he was promoted to the senior team to play in the second division of the 2009 Campeonato Paulista. After a successful campaign, scoring seven goals, he was signed by Ipatinga for R$250,000.

At Ipatinga he made his national league debut as a substitute in the 2009 Campeonato Brasileiro Série B game against Fortaleza. This was his one and only appearance in the competition, and in 2010 he signed initially for Atlético Sorocaba to play the second division of 2010 Campeonato Paulista and then for Caxias do Sul who were to play in 2010 Campeonato Brasileiro Série C. He was unable to break into the team at Caxias do Sul, and joined Sergipe at the end of the season. Here he quickly became an idol of the club, as top scorer of the 2011 Campeonato Sergipano and being voted best forward in the competition.

=== Bahia ===
Good performances for Sergipe came to the attention of Bahia who signed Rafael Grampola on a deal until the end of 2012. He initially went into the under-23 squad to play in 2011 Copa Governador do Estado da Bahia, where he scored two goals against Feirense. He did not repeat this success, and was loaned to Monte Azul in December 2011 to again play in the second division of Campeonato Paulista. He returned to Bahia with an injury, and with Sergipe still owning 20% of the player's rights, an internet campaign was started by fans of the club to secure his return. Instead, he was transferred to Anápolis, and subsequently loaned out to clubs competing in the lower divisions of Campeonato Goiano.

=== Mexico and Gama ===
In December 2013, Rafael Grampola signed for Mexican Ascenso MX side Zacatepec, where he did not have a good experience, getting injured and struggling to get back in the team. After eight months he returned to Brazil with Gama. At the start of his career with Gama he was not popular, being booed by fans during the semi-final of the 2015 Campeonato Brasiliense, however he scored two goals in the final which secured the tournament victory In 2016, although the club did not win any title, Rafael Grampola still had a good season, being top scorer in both Campeonato Brasiliense and 2016 Copa Verde.

=== Bragantino ===
In June 2016, Rafael Grampola signed for Bragantino, to play in 2016 Campeonato Brasileiro Série B. He scored seven goals in the tournament, but it was not enough to save the team from relegation. Towards the end of the season there was interest in him from Paysandu, but he stayed at Bragantino for the 2017 second division Campeonato Paulista season, scoring eight goals to help the club return to the top division as runners-up.

=== Joinville ===
In May 2017, Rafael Grampola transferred to Joinville to play in 2017 Campeonato Brasileiro Série C. He scored 13 goals in 15 games, including four in the 8–1 win over Mogi Mirim, and finished as top scorer in the competition. He followed this with seven goals, including two hat-tricks, in the 2017 Copa Santa Catarina. His total of 20 goals in 19 games made him the top scorer in Santa Catarina state football in 2017.

In the 2018 Campeonato Catarinense he was joint top scorer with nine goals, and was chosen as joint best forward in the end of championship awards. However he could not prevent Joinville from suffering relegation from 2018 Campeonato Brasileiro Série C in the second half of the year.

==== Série A with Paraná ====
With relegation confirmed and the season over, Joinville extended Rafael Grampola's contract, and a loan move was agreed to transfer him to Paraná for the remainder of the 2018 Campeonato Brasileiro Série A season. He made his top-flight debut on 5 August 2018 against Ceará, a game that ended in a 1–0 defeat. He scored his first (and only) goal of the campaign in a 1–1 draw with Chapecoense on 5 September 2018.

==== Return to Joinville ====
At the start of 2016, Rafael Grampola returned to Joinville. He lost his place in the team during 2019 Campeonato Catarinense and was not registered for the Série D squad, and in May 2019 his contract with the club was terminated.

=== Brasil de Pelotas ===
Soon after leaving Joinville, Rafael Grampola was confirmed as a Brasil de Pelotas player, joining the team to play 2019 Campeonato Brasileiro Série B.

== Honours ==
Gama

- Campeonato Brasiliense: 2015
