= 2015 in Brazilian football =

Football in Brazil
- Season: 2015

Men's football
- Série A: Corinthians
- Série B: Botafogo
- Série C: Vila Nova
- Série D: Botafogo-SP
- Copa do Brasil: Palmeiras

The following article presents a summary of the 2015 football (soccer) season in Brazil, which was the 114th season of competitive football in the country.

== Campeonato Brasileiro Série A ==
The 2015 Campeonato Brasileiro Série A started on May 9, 2015, and concluded on December 6, 2015.

- Atlético Mineiro
- Atlético Paranaense
- Avaí
- Chapecoense
- Corinthians
- Coritiba
- Cruzeiro
- Figueirense
- Flamengo
- Fluminense
- Goiás
- Grêmio
- Internacional
- Joinville
- Palmeiras
- Ponte Preta
- Santos
- São Paulo
- Sport
- Vasco da Gama

Pos	Team	Pld	W	D	L	GF	GA	GD	Pts	Qualification or relegation
1	Corinthians (C)	38	24	9	5	71	31	+40	81	2016 Copa Libertadores second stage (Note: Palmeiras has a berth guaranteed to the second stage as the 2015 Copa do Brasil champions.)
2	Atlético Mineiro	38	21	6	11	65	47	+18	69	2016 Copa Libertadores second stage
3	Grêmio	38	20	8	10	52	32	+20	68	2016 Copa Libertadores second stage
4	São Paulo	38	18	8	12	53	47	+6	62	2016 Copa Libertadores first stage
5	Internacional	38	17	9	12	39	38	+1	60	2016 Copa do Brasil round of 16 (Note: Since a Brazilian team didn't win the 2015 Copa Libertadores, an additional berth to the 2016 Copa do Brasil round of 16 will be given to the best team not qualified to the 2016 Copa Libertadores, the fifth-placed Internacional.)
6	Sport Recife	38	15	14	9	53	38	+15	59	2016 Copa Sudamericana second stage (Note: Teams will enter in the 2016 Copa Sudamericana if they do not reach the 2016 Copa do Brasil round of 16. Also, the 2015 Copa Verde champion (Cuiabá) and the 2016 Copa do Nordeste champion have a guaranteed berth.)
7	Santos	38	16	10	12	59	41	+18	58	2016 Copa Sudamericana second stage
8	Cruzeiro	38	15	10	13	44	35	+9	55	2016 Copa Sudamericana second stage
9	Palmeiras	38	15	8	15	60	51	+9	53	2016 Copa Libertadores second stage
10	Atlético Paranaense	38	14	9	15	43	48	−5	51	2016 Copa Sudamericana second stage
11	Ponte Preta	38	13	12	13	41	40	+1	51	2016 Copa Sudamericana second stage
12	Flamengo	38	15	4	19	45	53	−8	49	2016 Copa Sudamericana second stage
13	Fluminense	38	14	5	19	40	49	−9	47	2016 Copa Sudamericana second stage
14	Chapecoense	38	12	11	15	34	44	−10	47	2016 Copa Sudamericana second stage
15	Coritiba	38	11	11	16	31	42	−11	44	2016 Copa Sudamericana second stage
16	Figueirense	38	11	10	17	36	50	−14	43	2016 Copa Sudamericana second stage
17	Avaí (R)	38	11	9	18	38	60	−22	42	Relegation to 2016 Campeonato Brasileiro Série B
18	Vasco da Gama (R)	38	10	11	17	28	54	−26	41	Relegation to 2016 Campeonato Brasileiro Série B
19	Goiás (R)	38	10	8	20	39	49	−10	38	Relegation to 2016 Campeonato Brasileiro Série B
20	Joinville (R)	38	7	10	21	26	48	−22	31	Relegation to 2016 Campeonato Brasileiro Série B

Source: Soccerway.com
Rules for classification: 1) points; 2) wins; 3) goal difference; 4) goals scored; 5) head-to-head results; 6) least red cards received; 7) least yellow cards received; 8) draw.
(C) Champions; (R) Relegated
Notes:

Corinthians won the Campeonato Brasileiro Série A.

=== Relegation ===
The four worst placed teams, which are Avaí, Vasco da Gama, Goiás and Joinville, were relegated to the following year's second level.

== Campeonato Brasileiro Série B ==
The 2015 Campeonato Brasileiro Série B started on May 8, 2015, and concluded on November 28, 2015.

- ABC
- América-MG
- Atlético Goianiense
- Bahia
- Boa Esporte
- Botafogo
- Bragantino
- Ceará
- CRB
- Criciúma
- Luverdense
- Macaé
- Mogi Mirim
- Náutico
- Oeste
- Paraná
- Paysandu
- Sampaio Corrêa
- Santa Cruz
- Vitória

Pos	Team	Pld	W	D	L	GF	GA	GD	Pts	Qualification or relegation
1	Botafogo (P, C)	38	21	9	8	60	30	+30	72	Promoted to 2016 Série A
2	Santa Cruz (P)	38	20	7	11	63	43	+20	67	Promoted to 2016 Série A
3	Vitória (P)	38	19	9	10	58	40	+18	66	Promoted to 2016 Série A
4	América-MG (P)	38	19	8	11	55	39	+16	65	Promoted to 2016 Série A
5	Náutico	38	18	9	11	49	42	+7	63	
6	Bragantino	38	19	3	16	56	56	0	60	
7	Paysandu	38	17	9	12	49	40	+9	60	
8	Sampaio Corrêa	38	15	13	10	51	43	+8	58	
9	Bahia	38	15	13	10	48	41	+7	58	
10	Luverdense	38	15	9	14	46	40	+6	54	
11	CRB	38	15	9	14	47	45	+2	54	
12	Criciúma	38	12	13	13	36	41	−5	49	
13	Paraná	38	12	11	15	39	43	−4	47	
14	Atlético Goianiense	38	11	13	14	36	46	−10	46	
15	Ceará	38	12	9	17	42	50	−8	45	
16	Oeste	38	10	14	14	37	45	−8	44	
17	Macaé (R)	38	10	13	15	46	54	−8	43	Relegated to 2016 Série C
18	ABC (R)	38	6	14	18	41	64	−23	32	Relegated to 2016 Série C
19	Boa Esporte (R)	38	7	10	21	34	54	−20	31	Relegated to 2016 Série C
20	Mogi Mirim (R)	38	4	11	23	32	69	−37	23	Relegated to 2016 Série C

Updated to match(es) played on unknown. Source: Soccerway.com
Rules for classification: 1) points; 2) goal difference; 3) number of goals scored.
(C) Champions; (P) Promoted; (R) Relegated

Botafogo won the Campeonato Brasileiro Série B.

=== Promotion ===
The four best placed teams, which are Botafogo, Santa Cruz, Vitória and América-MG, were promoted to the following year's first level.

=== Relegation ===
The four worst placed teams, which are Macaé, ABC, Boa Esporte and Mogi Mirim, were relegated to the following year's third level.

== Campeonato Brasileiro Série C ==
The 2015 Campeonato Brasileiro Série C started on May 16, 2015, and concluded on November 21, 2015.

- Águia de Marabá
- América-RN
- ASA de Arapiraca
- Botafogo-PB
- Brasil de Pelotas
- Caxias
- Confiança
- Cuiabá
- Fortaleza
- Guarani
- Guaratinguetá
- Icasa
- Juventude
- Londrina
- Madureira
- Portuguesa
- Salgueiro
- Tombense
- Tupi
- Vila Nova

The Campeonato Brasileiro Série C final was played between Londrina and Vila Nova.

November 8, 2015

Londrina	1–0	Vila Nova

Estádio do Café

November 21, 2015

Vila Nova	4–1	Londrina

Estádio Serra Dourada

Vila Nova won the league after beating Londrina by aggregate score of 4–2.

=== Promotion ===
The four best placed teams, which are Vila Nova, Londrina, Tupi and Brasil de Pelotas, were promoted to the following year's second level.

=== Relegation ===
The four worst placed teams, which are Águia de Marabá, Madureira, Caxias and Icasa, were relegated to the following year's fourth level.

== Campeonato Brasileiro Série D ==
The 2015 Campeonato Brasileiro Série D started on July 12, 2015, and concluded on November 14, 2015.

- Aparecidense
- Botafogo-SP
- Caldense
- Campinense
- Central
- CEOV
- Colo Colo
- Comercial-MS
- Coruripe
- CRAC
- Duque de Caxias
- Estanciano
- Foz do Iguaçu
- Gama
- Globo
- Goianésia
- Guarani de Juazeiro
- Imperatriz
- Inter de Lages
- Lajeadense
- Metropolitano
- Nacional
- Náutico-RR
- Operário Ferroviário
- Palmas
- Red Bull Brasil
- Remo
- Resende
- Rio Branco
- Rio Branco-ES
- Ríver
- Santos-AP
- São Caetano
- Serra Talhada
- Serrano
- Treze
- Vilhena
- Villa Nova
- Volta Redonda
- Ypiranga de Erechim

The Campeonato Brasileiro Série D final was played between Botafogo-SP and Ríver-PI.

November 7, 2015

Botafogo-SP	3–2	Ríver

Estádio Santa Cruz

November 14, 2015

Ríver	0–0	Botafogo-SP

Estádio Albertão

Botafogo-SP won the league after beating Ríver by aggregate score of 3–2.

=== Promotion ===
The four best placed teams, which are Botafogo-SP, Ríver, Remo and Ypiranga de Erechim, were promoted to the following year's third level.

== Domestic cups ==
=== Copa do Brasil ===
The 2015 Copa do Brasil started on February 8, 2015, and concluded on December 2, 2015. The Copa do Brasil final was played between Palmeiras and Santos.

November 25, 2015

Santos	1–0	Palmeiras

Vila Belmiro

December 2, 2015

Palmeiras	2–1	Santos
Penalties
	4–3

Allianz Parque

Palmeiras won the cup after beating Santos 4–3 on penalties.

=== Copa do Nordeste ===
The competition featured 20 clubs from the Northeastern region, including for the first time the Maranhão and Piauí champions and runners-up. Ceará beat Bahia in the final with a 3–1 aggregate score.

=== Copa Verde ===
The competition featured 16 clubs from the North and Central-West regions, including the Espírito Santo champions. Mato Grosso's team Cuiabá defeated Pará's team Remo 6–5 on aggregate score.

== State championship champions ==
State	Champion
(Acre (state)) Acre	Rio Branco-AC
Alagoas	CRB
Amapá	Santos-AP
(Amazonas (Brazilian state)) Amazonas	Nacional
Bahia	Bahia
Ceará	Fortaleza
(Federal District (Brazil)) Distrito Federal	Gama
Espírito Santo	Rio Branco-ES
Goiás	Goiás
Maranhão	Imperatriz
Mato Grosso	Cuiabá
Mato Grosso do Sul	Comercial-MS
Minas Gerais	Atlético Mineiro
Pará	Remo
Paraíba	Campinense
(Paraná (state)) Paraná	Operário-PR
Pernambuco	Santa Cruz
Piauí	Ríver-PI
(Rio de Janeiro (state)) Rio de Janeiro	Vasco da Gama
Rio Grande do Norte	América-RN
Rio Grande do Sul	Internacional
Rondônia	Genus
Roraima	Náutico-RR
(Santa Catarina (state)) Santa Catarina	Joinville
(São Paulo (state)) São Paulo	Santos
Sergipe	Confiança
Tocantins	Tocantinópolis

== Youth competition champions ==
Competition	Champion
Campeonato Brasileiro Sub-20	Fluminense
Copa do Brasil Sub-17^{(1)}	Vitória
Copa do Brasil Sub-20	São Paulo
Copa Ipiranga Sub-20	São Paulo
Copa Santiago de Futebol Juvenil	Independiente del Valle (Ecuador)
Copa São Paulo de Futebol Júnior	Corinthians
Taça Belo Horizonte de Juniores	Corinthians
Copa 2 de Julho Sub-15	Bahia

^{(1)} The Copa Nacional do Espírito Santo Sub-17, between 2008 and 2012, was named Copa Brasil Sub-17. The similar named Copa do Brasil Sub-17 is organized by the Brazilian Football Confederation and it was first played in 2013.

== Other competition champions ==
Competition	Champion
Campeonato Paulista do Interior	Ponte Preta
Copa Espírito Santo	Espírito Santo
Copa FGF	Lajeadense
Copa Paulista	Linense
Copa Rio	Resende
Copa Verde	Cuiabá

== Brazilian clubs in international competitions ==
Team	2015 Copa Libertadores	2015 Copa Sudamericana
Atlético Mineiro	Round of 16 eliminated by (Brazil) Internacional	N/A
Atlético Paranaense	N/A	Quarterfinals (Paraguay) Sportivo Luqueño
Bahia	N/A	Second Stage eliminated by (Brazil) Sport Recife
Brasília	N/A	Round of 16 eliminated by (Brazil) Atlético Paranaense
Chapecoense	N/A	Quarterfinals (Argentina) River Plate
Corinthians	Round of 16 eliminated by (Paraguay) Guaraní	N/A
Cruzeiro	Quarterfinals eliminated by (Argentina) River Plate	N/A
Goiás	N/A	Second Stage eliminated by (Brazil) Brasília
Internacional	Semifinals eliminated by (Mexico) Tigres	N/A
Joinville	N/A	Second Stage eliminated by (Brazil) Atlético Paranaense
Ponte Preta	N/A	Second Stage eliminated by (Brazil) Chapecoense
São Paulo	Round of 16 eliminated by (Brazil) Cruzeiro	N/A
Sport Recife	N/A	Round of 16 eliminated by (Argentina) Huracán

== Brazil national team ==
The following table lists all the games played by the Brazilian national team in official competitions and friendly matches during 2015.

=== Friendlies ===
March 26	France	1–3	Brazil	Saint-Denis, France
21:00 (UTC+1)	Varane 21'	Report	Oscar 40'; Neymar 57'; Luiz Gustavo 69'	Stadium: Stade de France; Attendance: 81,338; Referee: Nicola Rizzoli (Italy)

March 29	Brazil	1–0	Chile	London, England
15:00 (UTC+1)	Firmino 71'	Report		Stadium: Emirates Stadium; Attendance: 60,007; Referee: Martin Atkinson (England)

June 7	Brazil	2–0	Mexico	São Paulo, Brazil
17:00 (UTC−03)	Coutinho 28'; Tardelli 37'	Report		Stadium: Allianz Parque; Attendance: 34,659; Referee: Julio César Quintana (Paraguay)

June 10	Brazil	1–0	Honduras	Porto Alegre, Brazil
22:00 (UTC−03)	Firmino 33'	Report		Stadium: Estádio Beira-Rio; Attendance: 22,305; Referee: Gery Vargas (Bolivia)

September 5	Brazil	1–0	Costa Rica	New Jersey, United States
17:00 (UTC−03)	Hulk 10'	Report		Stadium: Red Bull Arena; Attendance: 19,600; Referee: Mathieu Bourdeau (Canada)

September 8	United States	1–4	Brazil	Foxborough, United States
21:40 (UTC−03)	Williams 90+1'	Report	Hulk 9'; Neymar 51' (pen.), 67'; Rafinha 64'	Stadium: Gillette Stadium; Attendance: 29,308; Referee: Joel Aguilar (El Salvador)

=== Copa América ===
June 14 Group stage	Brazil	2–1	Peru	Temuco, Chile
18:30 (UTC−03)	Neymar 5'; Douglas Costa 90+2'	Report	Cueva 2'	Stadium: Estadio Municipal Germán Becker; Attendance: 16,342; Referee: Roberto García (Mexico)

June 17 Group stage	Brazil	0–1	Colombia	Santiago, Chile
21:00 (UTC−03)		Report	Murillo 36'	Stadium: Estadio Monumental David Arellano; Attendance: 44,008; Referee: Enrique Osses (Chile)

June 21 Group stage	Brazil	2–1	Venezuela	Santiago, Chile
18:30 (UTC−03)	Thiago Silva 9'; Firmino 51'	Report	Miku 84'	Stadium: Estadio Monumental David Arellano; Attendance: 33,284; Referee: Enrique Cáceres (Paraguay)

June 27 Quarter-finals	Brazil	1–1 (3–4 p)	Paraguay	Concepción, Chile
18:30 (UTC−03)	Robinho 15'	Report	González 72' (pen.)	Stadium: Estadio Municipal de Concepción; Attendance: 29,276; Referee: Andrés Cunha (Uruguay)
	Penalties
	Fernandinho (penalty scored); Ribeiro (penalty missed); Miranda (penalty scored); Douglas Costa (penalty missed); Coutinho (penalty scored)		(penalty scored) Martínez; (penalty scored) Cáceres; (penalty scored) Bobadilla; (penalty missed) Santa Cruz; (penalty scored) González

=== 2018 FIFA World Cup qualification ===
October 9	Chile	2–0	Brazil	Santiago, Chile
20:30 UTC−03	Vargas 72'; Sánchez 88'	Report		Stadium: Estadio Nacional Julio Martínez Prádanos; Referee: Roddy Zambrano (Ecuador)

October 13	Brazil	3–1	Venezuela	Fortaleza, Brazil
22:00 UTC−03	Willian 1', 42'; Oliveira 73'	Report	Santos 64'	Stadium: Estádio Castelão; Attendance: 38,970; Referee: Darío Ubriaco (Uruguay)

November 13 (Note: The match between Argentina and Brazil was originally scheduled to be played on November 12, 2015, 21:00 UTC−3, but was postponed to the following day due to bad weather.)	Argentina	1–1	Brazil	Buenos Aires, Argentina
19:00 UTC−03	Lavezzi 34'	Report	Lucas Lima 58'	Stadium: Estadio Monumental Antonio Vespucio Liberti; Referee: Antonio Arias (Paraguay)

November 17	Brazil	3–0	Peru	Salvador, Brazil
21:00 UTC−03	Douglas Costa 22'; Renato Augusto 57'; Filipe Luís 76'	Report		Stadium: Itaipava Arena Fonte Nova; Referee: Hernando Buitrago (Colombia)

== Women ==
=== National team ===
The following table lists all the games played by the Brazil women's national football team in official competitions and friendly matches during 2015.

==== Friendlies ====
April 8	Germany	4–0	Brazil	Fürth, Germany
13:00 (UTC-3)	Šašić 26' (pen.); Laudehr 35'; Leupolz 60'; Marozsán 86'	Report		Stadium: Stadion am Laubenweg; Referee: Riem Hussein (Germany)

September 19	France	2–1	Brazil	Le Havre, France
19:00 CET	Renard 37'; Henry 55'	Report (in French)	Poliana 80'	Stadium: Stade Océane, Attendance: 22,053; Referee: Kateryna Monzul (Ukraine)

October 21	United States	1–1	Brazil	Seattle, United States
19:00 PT	Lloyd 85'	Report	Monica 3'; Rafaelle (yellow card) 65'	Stadium: CenturyLink Field; Attendance: 23,603; Referee: Ekaterina Koroleva (United States)

October 25	United States	3–1	Brazil	Orlando, United States
14:30 ET	Morgan 9'; Dunn (yellow card) 14'; Dunn 45+2'; Horan (yellow card) 66'; McCaffrey 90+3'	Report	Cristiane (yellow card) 37'; Cristiane 45+1'	Stadium: Orlando Citrus Bowl; Attendance: 32,869; Referee: Margaret Domka (United States)

December 1	Brazil	5–1	New Zealand	Cuiabá, Brazil
21:00 BRT	Poliana 46'; Érika 48'; Formiga 59'; Marta 87'; Debinha 90+3'		Gregorius 30'	Stadium: Arena Pantanal; Attendance: 32,869

==== Algarve Cup ====
March 4 Group stage	Brazil	0–0	China	Albufeira, Portugal
15:00		Report		Stadium: Estádio Municipal; Referee: Stéphanie Frappart (France)

March 6 Group stage	Sweden	0–2	Brazil	Lagos, Portugal
13:30		Report	Marta 20'; Andressa 68' (pen.)	Stadium: Estádio Municipal; Referee: Qin Liang (China)

March 9 Group stage	Brazil	1–3	Germany	Parchal, Portugal
17:30	Bruna 47'	Report	Popp 39'; Šašić 49'; Marozsán 56'	Stadium: Stadium Bela Vista; Attendance: 769; Referee: Melissa Borjas (Honduras)

March 11 Seventh-place match	Brazil	4–1	Switzerland	Albufeira, Portugal
15:00	Marta 30', 77'; Bia 37'; Andressa 82'	Report	Wälti 45'	Stadium: Estádio Municipal; Referee: Jana Adámková (Czech Republic)

==== FIFA Women's World Cup ====
June 9 Group stage	Brazil	2–0	South Korea	Montreal, Canada
19:00 EDT (UTC−4)	Formiga 33'; Marta 53' (pen.)	Report		Stadium: Olympic Stadium; Attendance: 10,175; Referee: Esther Staubli (Switzerland)

June 13 Group stage	Brazil	1–0	Spain	Montreal, Canada
16:00 EDT (UTC−4)	Andressa 44'	Report		Stadium: Olympic Stadium; Attendance: 28,623; Referee: Carol Chenard (Canada)

June 17 Group stage	Costa Rica	0–1	Brazil	Moncton, Canada
20:00 ADT (UTC−3)		Report	Raquel 83'	Stadium: Moncton Stadium; Attendance: 9,543; Referee: Efthalia Mitsi (Greece)

June 21 Round of 16	Brazil	0–1	Australia	Moncton, Canada
14:00 ADT (UTC−3)		Report	Simon 80'	Stadium: Moncton Stadium; Attendance: 12,054; Referee: Teodora Albon (Romania)

==== Pan American Games ====
July 11 Group stage	Costa Rica	0–3	Brazil	Hamilton, Canada
18:00		Report	Raquel 14'; Thaisa 34'; Formiga 90'	Stadium: Hamilton Pan Am Soccer Stadium; Referee: Ekaterina Koroleva (United States)

July 15 Group stage	Brazil	7–1	Ecuador	Hamilton, Canada
17:35	Monica 17'; Cristiane 44', 55', 67', 70', 78'; Maurine 84'	http://results.toronto2015.org/IRS/en/football/results-women-b-06.htm Report]	Pesantes 5'	Stadium: Hamilton Pan Am Soccer Stadium; Referee: Gillian Martindale (Barbados)

July 19 Group stage	Canada	0–2	Brazil	Hamilton, Canada
20:35		Report	Alves 55'; Cristiane 87'	Stadium: Hamilton Pan Am Soccer Stadium; Referee: Ekaterina Koroleva (United States)

July 22 Semifinals	Brazil	4–2	Mexico	Hamilton, Canada
20:35	Cristiane 4'; Rafaelle Souza 45+1' 73'; Romero 46' (o.g.); Andressinha (yellow card) 69'	Report	Fabiana 25' (o.g.); Rangel 70'	Stadium: Hamilton Pan Am Soccer Stadium

July 25 Final	Brazil	4–0	Colombia	Hamilton, Canada
20:35	Formiga 7'; Maurine 75'; Alves 86'; Fabiana 90+3'	Report		Stadium: Hamilton Pan Am Soccer Stadium; Referee: Mirian Leon (El Salvador)

==== Torneio Internacional Feminino ====
November 9 Group stage	Brazil	11–0	Trinidad and Tobago	Natal, Brazil
18:15	Marta 10', 28', 30', 52', 58'; Beatriz 33', 55', 64'; Debinha 48'; Raquel 70'; Rilany 79'	Report		Stadium: Arena das Dunas

November 13 Group stage	Mexico	0–6	Brazil	Natal, Brazil
16:00		Report	Marta 2' (pen.), 11' (pen.); Debinha 18'; Andressa Alves 32'; Formiga 53'; Poliana 68'	Stadium: Arena das Dunas

November 16 Group stage	Brazil	2–1	Canada	Natal, Brazil
20:45	Andressa Alves 12'; Debinha 40'	Report	Bélanger 43'	Stadium: Arena das Dunas

November 20 Final	Brazil	3–1	Canada	Natal, Brazil
18:30	Andressa Alves 47'; Mônica 63', 81'	Report	Beckie 46'	Stadium: Arena das Dunas

The Brazil women's national football team competed in the following competitions in 2015:

Competition	Performance
Algarve Cup	Seventh-place
FIFA Women's World Cup	Round of 16
Torneio Internacional Feminino	Champions
Pan American Games	Champions

== Campeonato Brasileiro de Futebol Feminino ==
The 2015 Campeonato Brasileiro de Futebol Feminino started on September 7, 2015, and concluded on December 6, 2015. The Campeonato Brasileiro de Futebol Feminino final was played between Rio Preto and São José.

November 22, 2015

Rio Preto	1–0	São José

December 6, 2015

São José	1–1	Rio Preto

Rio Preto won the league by aggregate score of 2–1.

=== Copa do Brasil de Futebol Feminino ===
The 2015 Copa do Brasil de Futebol Feminino started on February 4, 2015, and concluded on April 8, 2015.

April 1, 2015

Ferroviária	3–3	Kindermann

Fonte Luminosa

April 8, 2015

Kindermann	5–2	Ferroviária

Estádio Carlos A.C. Neves

Kindermann won the cup 4–1 on points.

=== Domestic competition champions ===
Competition	Champion
Campeonato Carioca	Flamengo/Marinha
Campeonato Paulista	São José

=== Brazilian clubs in international competitions ===
Team	2015 Copa Libertadores Femenina
Ferroviária	Champions defeated (Chile) Colo Colo
São José	Fourth place defeated by (Argentina) UAI Urquiza
