= 2013 Campeonato Paraense =

Campeonato Paraense de Futebol
- Season: 2013
- Champions: Paysandu
- Relegated: Abaeté; Bragantino
- Copa do Brasil: Paysandu; Paragominas; Remo
- Série D: Paragominas
- Matches played: 85
- Goals scored: 263 (3.09 per match)
- Top goalscorer: Aleílson (Paragominas) - 13 goals

The 2013 Campeonato Paraense de Futebol was the 101st edition of Pará's top professional football league. The competition began in November 10, 2012 and ended on May 12, 2013. Paysandu won the championship by the 45th time, while Abaeté and Bragantino were relegated due to withdrawing.

== Format ==
The competition has three stages. On the First stage, 8 teams play a single round-robin. The two teams with the worst campaign on this stage are relegated to the state's second division. Due to the withdrawal of Abaeté and Bragantino, both teams were relegated.

On the Second stage, there are two rounds. Each round is a round-robin. The four best teams in each round advances to a playoff, so the winner of the round can be found.

On the Final stage, each round winner plays in the final. If the same team wins both round, that team is the champion.

The champion, the runner-up and the 3rd-placed team qualify to the 2014 Copa do Brasil. The best team who isn't on Campeonato Brasileiro Série A, Série B or Série C qualifies to Série D.

== Participating teams ==
=== First stage ===
Club	Home city	2012 result
Abaeté	Abaetetuba	6th (on First Stage)
Bragantino	Bragança	4th (on First Stage)
Castanhal	Castanhal	3rd (on First Stage)
Independente	Tucuruí	8th (on Second Stage)
Paragominas	Paragominas	1st (2nd division)
Parauapebas	Parauapebas	5th (on First Stage)
São Raimundo	Santarém	7th (on Second Stage)
Santa Cruz de Cuiarana	Salinópolis	2nd (2nd division)

=== Second stage ===
Club	Home city	2012 result
Águia de Marabá	Marabá	3rd
Cametá	Cametá	1st
Paragominas	Paragominas	1st (2nd division)
Paysandu	Belém	4th
Remo	Belém	2nd
Santa Cruz de Cuiarana	Salinópolis	2nd (2nd division)
São Francisco	Santarém	5th
Tuna Luso	Belém	6th

== First stage (Taça ACLEP) ==
Abaeté and Bragantino were relegated due to withdrawing.

Pos	Team	Pld	W	D	L	GF	GA	GD	Pts	Qualification
1	Santa Cruz de Cuiarana (A)	5	5	0	0	16	6	+10	15	Qualifies to the Second stage
2	Paragominas (A)	5	3	1	1	9	7	+2	10	Qualifies to the Second stage
3	Parauapebas	5	2	2	1	9	10	−1	8	
4	São Raimundo	5	2	1	2	8	5	+3	7	
5	Independente (PA)	5	1	0	4	7	14	−7	3	
6	Castanhal	5	0	0	5	1	8	−7	0	

Rules for classification: 1) points; 2) goal difference; 3) number of goals scored.
(A) Advance to a further round

=== Results ===
Home \ Away	CAS	IND	PAG	PAU	SCU	SRO
Castanhal			0–1	0–1	1–4	
Independente (PA)	1–0			2–3	1–2	
Paragominas		3–2				1–0
Parauapebas			2–2		2–5	
Santa Cruz de Cuiarana			3–2			2–0
São Raimundo	1–0	6–1		1–1		

Legend: Blue = home team win; Yellow = draw; Red = away team win.

== Second stage ==
=== First round (Taça Cidade de Belém) ===
==== Standings ====
Pos	Team	Pld	W	D	L	GF	GA	GD	Pts	Qualification
1	Remo (A)	7	6	1	0	15	8	+7	19	Qualifies to the Final stage
2	Paysandu (A)	7	5	1	1	19	10	+9	16	Qualifies to the Final stage
3	São Francisco (A)	7	3	2	2	14	12	+2	11	Qualifies to the Final stage
4	Paragominas (A)	7	3	2	2	11	10	+1	11	Qualifies to the Final stage
5	Cametá	7	2	1	4	6	7	−1	7	
6	Santa Cruz de Cuiarana	7	2	1	4	6	9	−3	7	
7	Águia de Marabá	7	1	3	3	7	12	−5	6	
8	Tuna Luso	7	0	1	6	1	11	−10	1	

Rules for classification: 1) points; 2) goal difference; 3) number of goals scored.
(A) Advance to a further round

==== Results ====
Home \ Away	AGM	CAM	PAG	PAY	REM	SCU	SFA	TUN
Águia de Marabá		0–0			2–3	1–0		0–0
Cametá			0–1	1–2	1–2		3–1	
Paragominas	1–1			1–2		2–2		
Paysandu	6–2					3–1	2–2	3–1
Remo			3–2	2–1		1–0	2–2	
Santa Cruz de Cuiarana		1–0					1–2	1–0
São Francisco	2–1		2–3					3–0
Tuna Luso		0–1	0–1		0–2			

Legend: Blue = home team win; Yellow = draw; Red = away team win.

==== Playoffs ====
Semifinals
1	Remo	2	2	4
4	Paragominas	2	0	2
2	Paysandu	2	6	8
3	São Francisco	0	1	1

Finals
1	Remo	1	1	2
2	Paysandu	1	2	3

===== Semifinals =====
====== First leg ======
February 13, 2013
20:30 UTC−03:00

São Francisco	0–2	Paysandu
	Report	João Neto 40'; Yago Pikachu 85'

Estádio Jader Barbalho, Santarém
Attendance: 5,343
Referee: Dewson Fernando de Freitas

February 14, 2013
20:30 UTC−03:00

Paragominas	2–2	Remo
Aleilson 23', 90+3'	Report	Val Barreto 4'; Fábio Paulista 63'

Estádio Arena do Município Verde, Santarém
Attendance: 2,403
Referee: Joelson Nazareno Ferreira Cardoso

====== Second leg ======
February 16, 2013
19:00 UTC−03:00

Paysandu	6–1	São Francisco
Rafael Oliveira 2', 9', 72'; João Neto 7', 19'; Djalma 55'	Report	Caçula 41'

Estádio da Curuzú, Belém
Attendance: 6,869
Referee: Joelson Silva dos Santos

February 17, 2013
16:00 UTC−03:00

Remo	2–0	Paragominas
Val Barreto 69'; Fábio Paulista 80'	Report

Mangueirão, Belém
Attendance: 11,891
Referee: Cláuber José Miranda

===== Finals =====
February 24, 2013
16:00 UTC−03:00

Paysandu	1–1	Remo
João Neto 34'	Report	Zé Antônio 90+1'

Mangueirão, Belém
Attendance: 36,668
Referee: Héber Roberto Lopes

March 3, 2013
16:00 UTC−03:00

Remo	1–2	Paysandu
Leandro Cearense 39'	Report	Raul 30', 86'

Mangueirão, Belém
Attendance: 38,193
Referee: Ricardo Marques Ribeiro

Paysandu won the First round and Taça Cidade de Belém.

=== Second round (Taça Estado do Pará) ===
==== Standings ====
Pos	Team	Pld	W	D	L	GF	GA	GD	Pts	Qualification
1	Paragominas (A)	7	5	0	2	15	11	+4	15	Qualifies to the Final stage
2	Paysandu (A)	7	4	3	0	16	7	+9	15	Qualifies to the Final stage
3	Remo (A)	7	4	0	3	10	10	0	12	Qualifies to the Final stage
4	Tuna Luso (A)	7	3	1	3	13	10	+3	10	Qualifies to the Final stage
5	Santa Cruz de Cuiarana	7	3	1	3	9	12	−3	10	
6	Cametá	7	1	4	2	10	13	−3	7	
7	Águia de Marabá	7	1	2	4	10	15	−5	5	
8	São Francisco	7	1	1	5	9	14	−5	4	

Rules for classification: 1) points; 2) goal difference; 3) number of goals scored.
(A) Advance to a further round

==== Results ====
Home \ Away	AGM	CAM	PAG	PAY	REM	SCU	SFA	TUN
Águia de Marabá			2–3	2–2			2–1	
Cametá	2–2					2–2		2–1
Paragominas		2–0			1–0		5–3	3–2
Paysandu		1–1	3–1		3–1			
Remo	1–0	3–1						1–0
Santa Cruz de Cuiarana	2–1		1–0	0–3	2–3			
São Francisco		2–2		0–2	3–1	0–1		
Tuna Luso	4–1			2–2		3–1	1–0	

Legend: Blue = home team win; Yellow = draw; Red = away team win.

==== Playoffs ====
Semifinals
1	Paragominas	0	2	2
4	Tuna Luso	0	1	1
2	Paysandu	1	1	2
3	Remo	2	2	4

Finals
1	Paragominas	0	3	3
3	Remo	1	1	2

===== Semifinals =====
====== First leg ======
April 20, 2013
18:30 UTC−03:00

Remo	2–1	Paysandu
Val Barreto 9'; Jhonnatan 36'	Report	Pablo 67'

Mangueirão, Belém
Attendance: 11,254
Referee: Joélson Silva dos Santos

April 21, 2013
9:30 UTC−03:00

Tuna Luso	0–0	Paragominas
	Report

Mangueirão, Belém
Attendance: 1,217
Referee: Andrey da Silva e Silva

====== Second leg ======
April 27, 2013
18:30 UTC−03:00

Paysandu	1–2	Remo
Djalma 51'	Report	Leandro Cearense 5'; Clebson 64'

Mangueirão, Belém
Attendance: 11,254
Referee: Ricardo Marques Ribeiro

April 28, 2013
17:30 UTC−03:00

Paragominas	2–1	Tuna Luso
Aleilson 83'; Beá 90+2'	Report	Fabricio 18'

Arena Verde, Paragominas
Attendance: 4,634
Referee: Dewson Fernando Freitas da Silva

===== Finals =====
May 1, 2013
17:00 UTC−03:00

Remo	1–0	Paragominas
Branco 73'	Report

Mangueirão, Belém
Attendance: 29,911
Referee: Joélson Nazareno Ferreira Cardoso

May 5, 2013
17:00 UTC−03:00

Paragominas	3–1	Remo
Aleilson 72', 90+3'; Weller 64'	Report	Branco 90'

Arena Verde, Paragominas
Attendance: 9,336
Referee: Dewson Fernando Freitas da Silva

Paragominas won the Second round and Taça Estado do Pará.

== Final stage ==
May 12, 2013
17:00 UTC−03:00

Paragominas	0–4	Paysandu
	Report	Djalma 23'; Eduardo Ramos 39'; Rafael Oliveira 42'; Iarley 83'

Arena Verde, Paragominas
Attendance: 4,927
Referee: Andrey da Silva e Silva

May 19, 2013
17:00 UTC−03:00

Paysandu	3–1	Paragominas
Raul 10'; Rafael Oliveira 29'; João Neto 43'	Report	Rubran 3'

Mangueirão, Belém
Attendance: 29,966
Referee: Joélson Nazareno Ferreira Cardoso

Paysandu won the 2013 Campeonato Paraense.
