= Beto Gonçalves =

Indonesian footballer (born 1980)

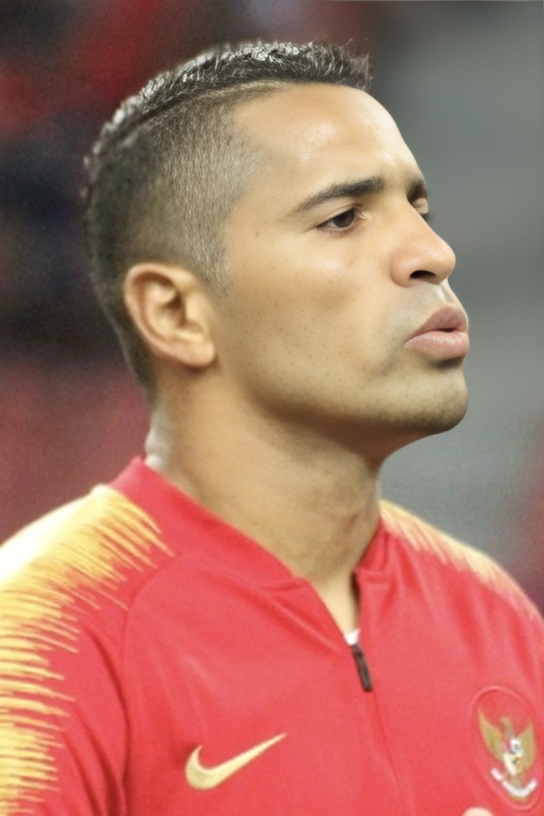
- Beto playing for Indonesia at the 2018 AFF Championship

Personal information
- Full name: Alberto Gonçalves da Costa
- Date of birth: 31 December 1980 (age 45)
- Place of birth: Belém, Brazil
- Height: 1.75 m (5 ft 9 in)
- Position: Striker

Team information
- Current team: Persekabpas Pasuruan
- Number: 9

Youth career
- –1999: Sport Belém

Senior career*
Years	Team	Apps	(Gls)
1999–2000	Sport Belém	15	(0)
2000	Vila Rica	3	(0)
2000–2001	São Raimundo	12	(8)
2001–2002	Abaeté	21	(14)
2002	Bragantino	12	(8)
2003–2004	HOB	15	(11)
2004–2005	Tuna Luso	23	(17)
2005–2006	Remo	28	(19)
2006	Farroupilha	15	(8)
2006	Marcílio Dias	13	(14)
2007	Remo	3	(0)
2007–2008	Juventude	6	(1)
2008–2009	Persijap Jepara	14	(7)
2009–2010	Persipura Jayapura	28	(18)
2010	Dempo	3	(1)
2010–2011	Persijap Jepara	14	(4)
2011–2012	Persipura Jayapura	34	(25)
2013–2014	Arema	55	(26)
2015–2016	Penang	17	(7)
2016–2018	Sriwijaya	88	(58)
2019–2024	Madura United	86	(39)
2019	→ Persija Jakarta (loan)	0	(0)
2020	→ Sriwijaya (loan)	0	(0)
2021	→ Persis Solo (loan)	14	(11)
2023–2024	→ PSBS Biak (loan)	22	(10)
2024–2025	PSBS Biak	22	(1)
2025	Persela Lamongan	10	(1)
2026	PSIS Semarang	13	(7)
2026–	Persekabpas Pasuruan	1	(2)

International career
2018	Indonesia U23 (O.P.)	5	(4)
2018–2019	Indonesia	12	(10)
- * Club domestic league appearances and goals as of 14 November 2026

Alberto Gonçalves da Costa (born 31 December 1980), commonly known as Beto Gonçalves or simply Beto, is a professional footballer who plays as a striker for Liga Nusantara club Persekabpas Pasuruan. Born in Brazil, he represented Indonesia at international level.

== Club career ==
=== Early career ===
Beto started his career with Sport Belém. After one year, he transferred to Vila Rica, where he became a striker.

=== Persipura Jayapura ===
His first season in Indonesia, he immediately brought his first Indonesian club Persipura Jayapura champions 2008-09 Indonesia Super League. In his first season in Indonesia he scored 7 goals in 14 league matches. In season 2011-12 Indonesia Super League, He returned to Persipura and He also became the top score of the season 2011-12 Indonesia Super League.

=== Arema ===
In 2013, Beto signed a year contract with Arema. He made his league debut on 9 January 2013 in a match against Persidafon Dafonsoro. On 9 January 2013, Beto scored his first goal for Arema in the 18th minute at the Kanjuruhan Stadium, Malang.

=== Sriwijaya ===
On 1 February 2016, he returned to Indonesia to strengthen Sriwijaya. He returned to beingthe top score of the season 2016 Indonesia Soccer Championship A and was also in the best starting XI that season too. For 3 seasons defending Sriwijaya, he scored 58 goals in 88 appearances and carry Sriwijaya won the pre-season competition 2018 East Kalimantan Governor Cup. On 25 August 2020, he returned to Sriwijaya with loan status from Madura United.

=== Madura United ===
On 20 February 2019, he officially joined Madura United from Sriwijaya. On 17 May 2019, he made his debut for the club, scoring two goals and providing Greg Nwokolo with an assist in a 5–1 victory against Persela.

==== Return to Sriwijaya (loan) ====
He was signed for Sriwijaya to play in the Liga 2 in the 2020 season, on loan from Madura United. This season was suspended on 27 March 2020 due to the COVID-19 pandemic. The season was abandoned and was declared void on 20 January 2021.

==== Persis Solo (loan) ====
On 26 April 2021, Beto signed for Indonesian Liga 2 club Persis Solo, on loan from Liga 1 club Madura United. He made his league debut on 26 September by starting in a 2–0 win against PSG Pati, and he also scored his first goal for Persis in the 20th minute at the Manahan Stadium, Surakarta.

==== PSBS Biak (loan) ====
On 9 September 2023, Beto signed for Indonesian Liga 2 club PSBS Biak, on loan from Liga 1 club Madura United. Beto helped the team secured their first-ever promotion to the top-tier league.

== International career ==
Gonçalves was naturalized as an Indonesian citizen on 8 February 2018, after staying in Indonesia for 12 years. He made his debut with Indonesia on 10 October 2018 in a friendly against Myanmar in which he scored a goal and also immediately provide 1 assist. On 15 June 2019, he scored four goals against Vanuatu in which Indonesia won 6–0. He was also included to the Indonesia Olympic squad as one of the senior players at the 2018 Asian Games. He also scored 4 goals in 5 appearances.

== Career statistics ==
=== Club ===
As of 14 November 2026

Club	Season	League			Cup (Note: Includes Piala Indonesia)		Continental (Note: Appearances in AFC Champions League) (Note: Appearances in AFC Cup)		Other (Note: Appearances in Indonesia President's Cup)		Total	
Club	Season	Division	Apps	Goals	Apps	Goals	Apps	Goals	Apps	Goals	Apps	Goals
Persijap Jepara	2008–09	Indonesia Super League	14	7	0	0	0	0	0	0	14	7
Persipura Jayapura	2009–10	Indonesia Super League	28	18	0	0	4	0	0	0	32	18
Dempo	2010–11	I-League	3	1	0	0	0	0	0	0	3	1
Persijap Jepara	2010–11	Indonesia Super League	14	4	0	0	0	0	0	0	14	4
Persipura Jayapura	2011–12	Indonesia Super League	34	25	0	0	0	0	0	0	34	25
Arema	2013	Indonesia Super League	29	14	0	0	0	0	0	0	29	14
Arema	2014	Indonesia Super League	26	12	0	0	7	0	0	0	33	12
Arema	Total		55	26	0	0	7	0	0	0	62	26
Penang	2015	Malaysia Premier League	17	7	0	0	0	0	0	0	17	7
Sriwijaya	2016	Indonesia Soccer Championship A	30	25	0	0	0	0	0	0	30	25
Sriwijaya	2017	Liga 1	33	22	0	0	0	0	4	1	37	23
Sriwijaya	2018	Liga 1	25	11	0	0	0	0	6	2	31	13
Sriwijaya	Total		88	58	0	0	0	0	10	3	98	61
Madura United	2019	Liga 1	27	18	5	3	0	0	6	3	38	24
Madura United	2020	Liga 1	3	3	0	0	0	0	0	0	3	3
Madura United	2021–22	Liga 1	15	7	0	0	0	0	4 (Note: Appearances in Menpora Cup)	1	19	8
Madura United	2022–23	Liga 1	32	10	0	0	–		4	1	36	11
Madura United	2023–24	Liga 1	9	1	0	0	–		0	0	9	1
Madura United	Total		86	39	5	3	0	0	14	5	105	47
Persija Jakarta (loan)	2019	Liga 1	0	0	0	0	2	1	0	0	2	1
Sriwijaya (loan)	2020	Liga 2	0	0	0	0	–		0	0	0	0
Persis Solo (loan)	2021	Liga 2	14	11	0	0	–		0	0	14	11
PSBS Biak (loan)	2023–24	Liga 2	22	10	0	0	–		0	0	22	10
PSBS Biak	2024–25	Liga 1	22	1	0	0	–		0	0	22	1
Persela Lamongan	2025–26	Championship	10	1	0	0	–		0	0	10	1
PSIS Semarang	2025–26	Championship	13	7	0	0	–		0	0	13	7
Persekabpas Pasuruan	2026–27	Liga Nusantara	1	2	0	0	–		0	0	1	2
Career total			311	155	5	3	13	1	24	8	349	167

=== International ===
As of match played 5 September 2019

Indonesia national team
Year	Apps	Goals
2018	6	3
2019	6	7
Total	12	10

As of match played 5 September 2019
Scores and results list Indonesia's goal tally first, score column indicates score after each Beto goal.

List of international goals scored by Beto Gonçalves
No.	Date	Venue	Cap	Opponent	Score	Result	Competition
1	10 October 2018	Wibawa Mukti Stadium, Cikarang, Indonesia	1	Myanmar	1–0	3–0	Friendly
2	16 October 2018	Wibawa Mukti Stadium, Cikarang, Indonesia	2	Hong Kong	1–0	1–1	Friendly
3	13 November 2018	Gelora Bung Karno Stadium, Jakarta, Indonesia	4	Timor-Leste	3–1	3–1	2018 AFF Championship
4	11 June 2019	King Abdullah II Stadium, Amman, Jordan	7	Jordan	1–4	1–4	Friendly
5	15 June 2019	Gelora Bung Karno Stadium, Jakarta, Indonesia	8	Vanuatu	1–0	6–0	Friendly
6	15 June 2019	Gelora Bung Karno Stadium, Jakarta, Indonesia	8	Vanuatu	3–0	6–0	Friendly
7	15 June 2019	Gelora Bung Karno Stadium, Jakarta, Indonesia	8	Vanuatu	4–0	6–0	Friendly
8	15 June 2019	Gelora Bung Karno Stadium, Jakarta, Indonesia	8	Vanuatu	5–0	6–0	Friendly
9	5 September 2019	Gelora Bung Karno Stadium, Jakarta, Indonesia	9	Malaysia	1–0	2–3	2022 FIFA World Cup qualification
10	5 September 2019	Gelora Bung Karno Stadium, Jakarta, Indonesia	9	Malaysia	2–1	2–3	2022 FIFA World Cup qualification

== Honours ==
Persipura Jayapura

- Indonesia Super League: 2008–09
- Indonesian Community Shield: 2009
- Copa Indonesia runner-up: 2007–08

Arema

- East Java Governor Cup: 2013
- Menpora Cup: 2013

Sriwijaya

- East Kalimantan Governor Cup: 2018

Persis Solo

- Liga 2: 2021

PSBS Biak

- Liga 2: 2023–24

Individual

- Indonesia Super League/Indonesia Soccer Championship A Top Goalscorer (2): 2011–12, 2016
- Copa Indonesia Top Goalscorer: 2007–08
- Indonesia Soccer Championship A Best XI: 2016
- East Kalimantan Governor Cup Top Goalscorer: 2018
- Liga 1 Team of the Season: 2019 (Substitutes)
- Indonesian Soccer Awards: Best 11 2019
- Liga 2 Top Goalscorer: 2021
- Liga 2 Best XI: 2021

== See also ==
- List of Indonesia international footballers born outside Indonesia
