= Republic (disambiguation) =

A republic is a form of government.

Republic(s) or The Republic may also refer to:

== Governments ==
- List of republics
- First Republic (disambiguation)
- Second Republic (disambiguation)
- Third Republic (disambiguation)
- Fourth Republic (disambiguation)
- Fifth Republic (disambiguation)
- Irish Republic (1916, 1919–1922), not to be confused with the contemporary Republic of Ireland
- Republic of Ireland (1922–present), sometimes called "The Republic" to distinguish it from Northern Ireland or the island of Ireland
- Republic of South Africa (1961–present)
- Sixth Republic of South Korea (1987–present)
- Roman Republic (c. 509 BC – 27 BC)
- Dutch Republic (1579–1795)
- United States of America (1776–present), sometimes called "The Republic", especially in a classical sense
- Weimar Republic (1918–1933)
- Democratic People's Republic of Korea (North Korea), frequently shortened in the country to just "the Republic" (공화국; Gonghwaguk)
- A term for federated states in some federations:
  - Republics of the Soviet Union
  - Republics of Russia
  - Autonomous republic

== Art, entertainment, and media ==
=== Writings ===
- Republic (Plato), a dialogue by Plato
- De re publica (The Republic), a dialogue by Cicero
- Republic (Zeno), a partially lost text by Zeno of Citium
- Republic, a lost text by Crates of Thebes
- Republic, a lost text by Diogenes of Sinope
- Six livres de la république or La République (Republic in English), a 1577 book by Jean Bodin

=== Films ===
- Republic (film), a 2021 Indian Telugu-language film
- The Republic (film), 1998 Turkish film

=== Music ===
- Republic (band), a Hungarian rock group
- Republica, a British electronic/rock group
- Republic (album), a 1993 New Order album
- Republic?, a 2005 Sheavy album

=== News channels ===
- Republic TV, an Indian English language news channel
- Republic Bharat, and Indian Hindi language news channel

=== Periodicals ===
- The Republic (Columbus, Indiana), a daily newspaper in Columbus, Indiana
- The Republic (newspaper), a bi-weekly publication from Vancouver, Canada
- The Arizona Republic, largest newspaper in Arizona
- The Beresford Republic, a weekly newspaper in Beresford, South Dakota

=== Other arts and media ===
- Galactic Republic, a form of interplanetary government in the Star Wars universe
- Republic: The Revolution, a 2003 computer strategy game
- Statue of The Republic, a statue in Jackson Park, Chicago

== Places ==
=== United States ===
- Republic, Kansas
- Republic, Michigan
- Republic, Missouri
- Republic, Ohio
- Republic, Pennsylvania
- Republic, Washington
- Republic, West Virginia

=== Other countries ===
- Republic (peak), a mountain in Azerbaijan

== Enterprises ==
- Republic (fintech), an investment platform
- Republic (retailer), a British clothing retailer
- Republic Pictures, an American movie and serial production company
- Republic Records, a subsidiary of Universal Music Group
- Republic Services, an American waste disposal company

== Political advocacy ==
- Republic (Belarus), a parliamentary group
- Republic (pressure group), a British republican organisation
- Republic (Transnistria), a political party
- Republic (Latvia), a political party
- Republic (Slovakia), a political party
- Republic (Croatian political party), a political party

== Transportation ==
- Republic Airport, a general aviation airport on Long Island, New York
- Republic Aviation, an American aircraft manufacturer notable for producing the P-47 Thunderbolt, the F-84 Thunderjet, and the F-105 Thunderchief
- Republic Airlines refers to two companies
  - Republic Airlines (1979–1986), a defunct airline purchased by Northwest Airlines that ceased operating in 1986
  - Republic Airlines, a regional air carrier affiliated with US Airways
- Republic Motor Truck Company, a manufacturer of commercial trucks based in Alma, Michigan circa 1913–1929
- RMS Republic (1903), the second White Star liner to bear the name and the first ship ever to signal distress by wireless telegraphy; lost after colliding with the SS Florida
- SS Republic (1853) (originally named SS Tennessee and named USS Mobile for a time), a ship lost in an 1865 hurricane with a large cargo of gold coins
- SS Republic (1871), an Oceanic class liner of the White Star Line

== Other uses ==
- The Republic, a pub in Norwood, Adelaide, Australia
- Republic Theater (disambiguation)

== See also ==
- Republica (disambiguation)
- Republican (disambiguation)
- République (disambiguation)
- Old Republic (disambiguation)
- New Republic (disambiguation)
- Republik, a Swiss news magazine
