= Republicain =

Republicain, republicaine, Le Républicain, La Républicaine, or Les républicains may refer to:

- French ship Républicain, several ships of France by the name "Républicain" or "Républicaine"

== Newspapers ==
- Le Républicain (Niger), a newspaper in Niamey, Niger
- L'Est Républicain (The East Republican) Nancy, France; a newspaper
- Le Républicain Lorrain (The Lorraine Republican) Metz, France; a newspaper

== Political parties ==
- Parti republicain/Republican Party (Canada)
- Parti républicain du Québec (PRQ) the Republican Party of Quebec
- Mouvement républicain populaire (MRP) a Christian democrat party of France
- Mouvement National Republicain (MNR) a nationalist party of France
- Les Républicains (LR) a centre-right party of France
- Parti républicain (PR) a liberal-conservative party of France
- Rassemblement des Republicains (RDR) a liberal party of Ivory Coast
- Mouvement Républicain (MR) a political party of Mauritius
- Mouvement Démocratique Républicain (MDR) a political party of Rwanda
- Mouvement Republicain Sénégalais (MRS) Republican Movement of Senegal
- Parti Républicain de Vanuatu (PRV) Vanuatu Republican Party
- Parti Républicain Dahoméen (PRD) Republican Party of Dahomey

== See also ==
- French frigate Républicaine française (1794)
- Republican (disambiguation)
- République (disambiguation)
- Republic (disambiguation)
