= Campeonato Paraense Série A2 =

Football league in Pará, Brazil

Campeonato Paraense Second Division
- Organising body: FPF
- Founded: 1994; 32 years ago
- Country: Brazil
- State: Pará
- Level on pyramid: 2
- Promotion to: Campeonato Paraense
- Relegation to: Paraense 3rd Division
- Current champions: São Raimundo (1st title) (2025)
- Most championships: Bragantino; Vila Rica (3 titles each)
- Website: FPF Official website

The Campeonato Paraense Second Division, Campeonato Paraense Série A2 (former B1), also nicknamed Segundinha, is the second tier of the professional state football league in the Brazilian state of Pará. It is run by the Pará Football Federation (FPF).

== List of champions ==
Following is the list with all the champions of Paraense Second Level:

Season	Champions	Runners-up
1994	Pedreira (1)	Pinheirense
1995	Vila Rica (1)	Sport Belém
1996	Ananindeua (1)	Santa Rosa
1997	São Francisco (1)	São Raimundo
1998	Not held	
1999	Carajás (1)	Tiradentes
2000	Pedreira (2)	Bragantino
2001	Vila Rica (2)	Ananindeua
2002	Bragantino (1)	Vila Rica
2003	Castanhal (1)	Vila Rica
2004	Abaeté (1)	Independente
2005	Vênus (1)	AC Izabelense
2006	Tiradentes (1)	Vila Rica
2007	Vila Rica (3)	Pinheirense
2008	Sport Belém (1)	Time Negra
2009	Independente (1)	Santa Rosa
2010	Parauapebas (1)	Abaeté
2011	Bragantino (2)	São Francisco
2012	Paragominas (1)	Santa Cruz
2013	Time Negra (2)	Gavião Kyikatejê
2014	Vênus (2)	Tuna Luso
2015	Águia de Marabá (1)	São Raimundo
2016	Pinheirense (1)	Castanhal
2017	Bragantino (3)	Parauapebas
2018	Tapajós (1)	São Francisco
2019	Itupiranga (1)	Carajás
2020	Tuna Luso (1)	Gavião Kyikatejê
2021	Amazônia Independente (1)	Caeté
2022	Cametá (1)	São Francisco
2023	Canaã (1)	Santa Rosa
2024	Independente (2)	Capitão Poço
2025	São Raimundo (1)	Amazônia Independente

Notes

- Carajás EC is called Time Negra from 2007 to 2016 due a partnership with Paysandu SC.

=== Titles by team ===
- Bragantino – 3
- Vila Rica – 3
- Carajás – 2
- Independente – 2
- Pedreira – 2
- Vênus – 2
- Abaeté – 1
- Águia de Marabá – 1
- Ananindeua – 1
- Cametá – 1
- Canaã – 1
- Castanhal – 1
- Itupiranga – 1
- Paragominas – 1
- Parauapebas – 1
- Pinheirense – 1
- São Francisco – 1
- São Raimundo – 1
- Sport Belém – 1
- Tapajós – 1
- Tiradentes – 1
- Tuna Luso – 1
- Amazônia Independente – 1

=== By city ===
City	Championships	Clubs
Belém	11	Vila Rica (3), Carajás (2), Pedreira (2), Pinheirense (1), Sport Belém (1), Tiradentes (1), Tuna Luso (1)
Santarém	4	Amazônia Independente (1), São Francisco (1), São Raimundo (1), Tapajós (1)
Abaetetuba	3	Vênus (2), Abaeté (1)
Bragança	3	Bragantino (3)
Tucuruí	2	Independente (2)
Ananindeua	1	Ananindeua (1)
Cametá	1	Cametá (1)
Canaã dos Carajás	1	Canaã (1)
Castanhal	1	Castanhal (1)
Itupiranga	1	Itupiranga (1)
Marabá	1	Águia de Marabá (1)
Paragominas	1	Paragominas (1)
Parauapebas	1	Parauapebas (1)
