= Amazônia Independente Futebol Clube =

Brazilian association football club based in Santarém, Pará, Brazil

Amazônia Independente
- Full name: Amazônia Independente Futebol Clube
- Nicknames: Muiraquitã da Amazônia (Muiraquitã from Amazon); Sapo Doido (Crazy Frog)
- Founded: 22 June 2021; 4 years ago
- Ground: Estádio Municipal Colosso do Tapajós
- Capacity: 17,846
- President: Walter Lima
- Head coach: Matheus Lima
- League: Campeonato Paraense Second Division
- 2022: Paraense, 12th of 12 (relegated)
Home colors	Away colors	Third colors

Amazônia Independente Futebol Clube, commonly referred to as Amazônia Independente, is a Brazilian professional club based in Santarém, Pará founded on 22 June 2021. It competes in the Campeonato Paranese, the top tier of the Pará state football league.

== Stadium ==
Amazônia Independente play their home games at Estádio Municipal Colosso do Tapajós. The stadium has a maximum capacity of 17,846 people.

== Honours ==
- Campeonato Paraense Second Division
  - Winners (1): 2021
- Campeonato Paraense Third Division
  - Winners (1): 2024

== Competition record ==
Campeonato Paraense
Season	Tier	Division	Place
2021	2	Série B	1º
2022	1	Primeira Divisão	12º (R)
2023	2	Série B1	18º (R)
2024	3	Série B2	1º
