= La Nouvelle République =

La Nouvelle République may refer to:

- La Nouvelle République du Centre-Ouest (Tours, France)
- La Nouvelle République des Pyrénées (Tarbes, France)
- La Nouvelle République (Algeria)
- La Nouvelle République (Ivory Coast)

== See also ==
- République (disambiguation)
- New Republic (disambiguation)
- Republic (disambiguation)
