= Pedreira Esporte Clube =

Brazilian association football club

Pedreira
- Full name: Pedreira Esporte Clube
- Nickname: Gigante da Ilha (Giant of the Island)
- Founded: 7 September 1925; 100 years ago
- President: Paulo Sérgio Cruz
- Head coach: Júnior Amorim
- League: Campeonato Paraense Second Division
- 2021: Paraense 2nd Division, 3rd of 23
Home colors	Away colors

Pedreira Esporte Clube, commonly referred to as Pedreira, is a Brazilian professional club based in Mosqueiro, administrative district of the city of Belém, Pará founded on 7 September 1925.

== Honours ==
- Campeonato Paraense Second Division
  - Winners (2): 1994, 2000
- Campeonato Paraense Third Division
  - Winners (1): 2024
- Taça ACLEP
  - Winners (1): 2002
