= Republika =

Republika means "Republic" or "The Republic" in several Balto-Slavic languages. It may refer to:

- DWFO, an FM radio station in Metro Manila, Philippines known as 87.5 Republika
  - 87.9 Republika Davao, its regional counterpart based in Davao City, Philippines
- Republika (band), a Polish rock band active 1978–1986 and 1990-2001
- Telewizja Republika, a Polish television channel
- Republika (Croatian magazine), a Croatian monthly for literature, arts and society established in 1945
- Republika (Indonesian newspaper), an Indonesian national daily newspaper published in 1993–2022, currently an online portal
- Republika (Macedonian newspaper), a Macedonian weekly newspaper established in 2012
- Republika (Serbian magazine), a Serbian magazine established in 1989
- Republic Movement (Slovak: Republika), a Slovak far-right party
- Republika, former name of We Change the Rules, a Latvian right-wing party

== See also ==
- Republic (disambiguation)
- Republica (disambiguation)
