= Autonomous republics of Russia =

Autonomous republics of Russia may refer to:

- the modern Republics of Russia
- the former Autonomous republics of the RSFSR
- in a larger sense, the former Autonomous Soviet Socialist Republics of the Soviet Union

== See also ==
- Autonomous republic
- Autonomous administrative division
- Republic (disambiguation)
