= Parauapebas Futebol Clube =

Brazilian association football club based in Parauapebas, Pará, Brazil

Parauapebas
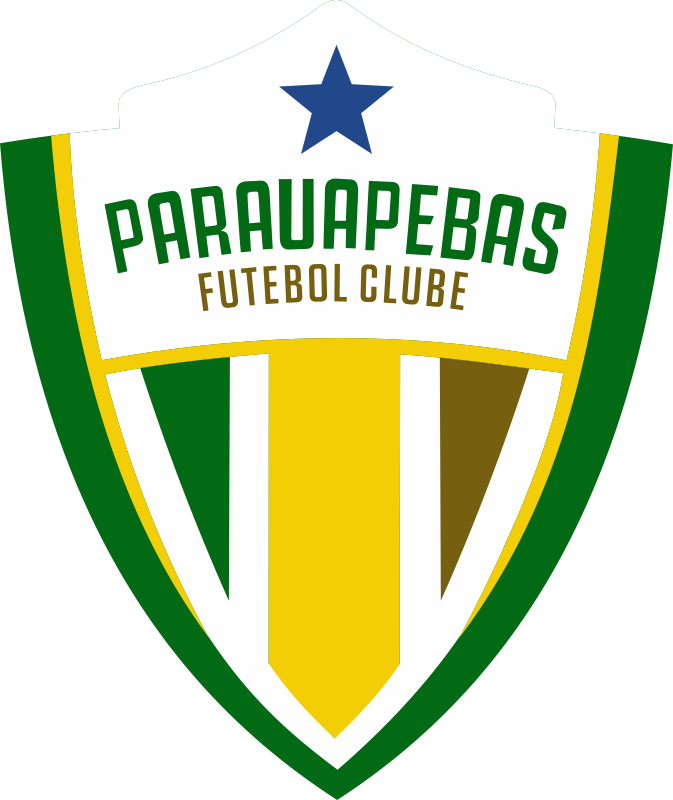
- Full name: Parauapebas Futebol Clube
- Nicknames: Trem de Ferro (Iron Train); Gigante de Aço (Steel Giant)
- Founded: 24 June 1989; 36 years ago
- Ground: Rosenão
- Capacity: 10,000
- President: Robervaldo Freitas
- League: Campeonato Paraense Second Division
- 2021: Paraense 2nd Division, 5th of 23
Home colors	Away colors

Parauapebas Futebol Clube, commonly referred to as Parauapebas, is a Brazilian professional club based in Parauapebas, Pará founded on 24 June 1989.

== History ==
The club was founded on June 24, 1989. They won the Campeonato Paraense Second Level in 2010, after defeating Abaeté in the final and thus the club was promoted to the following year's first level. Parauapebas competed in the Campeonato Paraense in 2011, when they finished in the fifth position in the First Stage. They finished in the fifth position again in the First Stage of the 2012 Campeonato Paraense, thus failing again to reach the Second Stage of the league.

== Honours ==
- Campeonato Paraense Second Division
  - Winners (1): 2010
- Taça ACLEP
  - Winners (1): 2015

== Stadium ==
Parauapebas Futebol Clube play their home games at Estádio José Raimundo Roseno Araújo, commonly known as Rosenão. The stadium has a maximum capacity of 10,000 people.
