= Third Ukrainian Republic =

Third Ukrainian Republic may refer to:

- A non-parliamentary movement in Ukraine founded by Yuriy Lutsenko
- Third Ukrainian Republic (party), a political party in Ukraine

== See also ==
- Third Republic (disambiguation)
