= Old Republic =

Old Republic may refer to

== Star Wars ==
- Galactic Republic, also known as the Old Republic, interplanetary state in the Star Wars universe
  - Star Wars: The Old Republic, a massively multiplayer online role-playing game based in the Star Wars universe
  - Star Wars: The Old Republic (comics), a comic book
  - Star Wars: The Old Republic (novel series), a 2010s novel series

== Places ==
- First Brazilian Republic (1889–1930), Old Republic or República Velha, a period in Brazilian history
- Old Republic (Portugal), 1918–1926, an era within the First Portuguese Republic

=== Facilities and structures ===
- Old Republic Building, Chicago, Illinois, U.S., an office building

== Other uses ==
- Old Republic International, U.S. insurance company

== See also ==
- Old Republican (U.S. politics)
- Old (disambiguation)
- Republic (disambiguation)
