= Rosenão =

Brazilian stadium

Estádio José Raimundo Roseno Araújo
- Rosenão
- Full name: Estádio José Raimundo Roseno Araújo
- Location: Parauapebas, Pará, Brazil
- Owner: Parauapebas City Hall
- Capacity: 10,000
- Surface: Grass
- Field size: 105 x 68 m

Construction
- Renovated: 2021

Tenants
- Atlético Paraense; Parauapebas

Estádio José Raimundo Roseno Araújo is a stadium located in Parauapebas, Brazil. It is used mostly for football matches and hosts the home matches of Atlético Paraense and Parauapebas. The stadium has a maximum capacity of 10,000 people.
