= Salinópolis Airport =

Salinópolis Airport Aeroporto de Salinópolis
- IATA: OPP; ICAO: SNSM; LID: PA0250

Summary
- Airport type: Public
- Operator: Infraero (2024–present)
- Serves: Salinópolis
- Time zone: BRT (UTC−03:00)
- Elevation AMSL: 36 m (118 ft)
- Coordinates: 00°41′47″S 047°20′12″W
- Website: www4.infraero.gov.br/aeroporto-de-salinopolis/

Map
- Location in Brazil OPP (Brazil)

Runways
Direction	Length		Surface
Direction	m	ft	Surface
09/27	1,600	3,281	Asphalt

Statistics (2025)
- Passengers: 2,813 ▲23%
- Aircraft Operations: 1,336 ▲30%
- Metric tonnes of cargo: 6 ▼54%
- Statistics: Infraero; Sources: Airport Website, ANAC, DECEA

Salinópolis Airport (IATA: OPP, ICAO: SNSM) is the airport serving Salinópolis, Brazil.

It is managed by contract by Infraero.

== History ==
On March 1, 2024 the State of Pará signed a contract of operation with Infraero.

== Airlines and destinations ==
Airlines	Destinations
Azul Conecta	Belém

== Access ==
The airport is located 9 km (6 mi) from downtown Salinópolis.

== See also ==
- List of airports in Brazil
