= New Republic =

New Republic may refer to:

== Places ==
- New Republic, California, former name of Santa Rita, Monterey County, California
- New Republic (Santarem), district in the city of Santarém, Pará

=== Countries ===
- New Republic (Brazil), the restored civilian government of Brazil since 1985
- New Republic (Portugal), 1917-1918, an era within the First Portuguese Republic
- New Republic (South Africa) (Afrikaans: Nieuwe Republiek, 1884–1888), a short-lived country in 1880s South Africa

=== Fictional locations ===
- New Republic (Star Wars), a fictional government from Star Wars
- New Republic (Singularity Sky), a fictional polity in the 2004 novel Singularity Sky by Charles Stross

== Politics ==
- New Republic Party (Costa Rica)
- New Republic (Romania), a political party in Romania
- New Republic Party (South Africa), a defunct political party in South Africa
- Union for the New Republic (France), a political party
- Union for the New Republic (Gabon), a political party
- Union for the New Republic (Guinea), a political party
- Democratic Union for the New Republic (Italy), a political party

== Literature ==
- The New Republic, an American politics and culture magazine
- The New Republic (novel), an 1878 satirical novel by William Hurrell Mallock
- The New Republic (newspaper), defunct Chinese-language newspaper in Canada (~1912–1984)

== See also ==
- New Republic Pictures, a film and television production company
- New Republican Party (Malawi)
- New Republican Society (Netherlands)
- New Republican Force (Bolivia), a political party
- La Nouvelle République (disambiguation), "New Republic" in French
- New Republic Party (disambiguation)
