= République =

Republique or La République or variation may refer to:

== Places ==
- Place de la République (disambiguation), several public squares
- République station, a Paris Metro station
- Rue de la République, a street in Lyon, France

== Vehicles ==
- French battleship République, a pre-dreadnought battleship of the French Navy built in 1902
- République-class battleship
- La République (airship)

== Other uses ==
- République (video game), an episodic action-adventure stealth video game
- Republique / Revolver, formerly Republique Theatre, Copenhagen, Denmark

== See also ==
- French ship République française (1802)
- La Nouvelle République (disambiguation)
- Republic (disambiguation)
- Republicain (disambiguation)
