= Sixth Republic =

Sixth Republic may refer to:

== Governments ==
- Sixth Brazilian Republic (1985–present)
- Sixth Republic of Korea (1987–present)
- Sixth Republic of Niger (2009–2010)

== See also ==
- Proposed French Sixth Republic
- First Republic
- Second Republic
- Third Republic
- Fourth Republic
- Fifth Republic
- Seventh Republic
