= Republica (disambiguation) =

Republica is an English alternative rock band formed in 1994.

Republica may also refer to:

== Companies ==
- Republica A/S, a Danish advertising company
- República, LLC, an advertising company headquartered in Miami, Florida

== Conferences ==
- re:publica, a yearly conference in Berlin

== Organisms ==
- Republica (damselfly), a fossil damselfly genus from the Klondike Mountain Formation
- Republica (plant), a fossil plant genus from the western North American Eocene

== Places ==
- República (district of São Paulo), Brazil
- República metro station (Santiago), in Santiago, Chile
- Republica metro station, in Bucharest, Romania

== Publications ==
- Republica (journal), Australian literary journal published 1994–5, see List of literary magazines
- My Republica, Nepalese newspaper

== See also ==
- La República (disambiguation)
- La Repubblica, an Italian newspaper
- Republic (disambiguation)
- Republika (disambiguation)
