= Jésum =

Brazilian footballer

Personal information
- Full name: Jésum Gabriel
- Date of birth: 25 December 1953 (age 72)
- Place of birth: Corinto, Brazil
- Height: 1.66 m (5 ft 5 in)
- Position: Forward

Senior career*
Years	Team	Apps	(Gls)
1971–1972	Villa Nova		
1972–1975	São Paulo	50	(2)
1975	Cruzeiro		
1976–1978	Bahia		
1979–1980	Grêmio	62	(7)
1980–1981	Cruzeiro		
1982	Internacional		
1982–1983	Cruzeiro		
1983	Paysandu		
1984	Figueirense		
1985	Cruzeiro		
1986	Vitória		
1987	Atlético de Alagoinhas		
1987	Taubaté		
1989	Uberlândia		
- * Club domestic league appearances and goals as of 14 October 2023

Jésum Gabriel (born 25 December 1953), simply known as Jésum, is a Brazilian former professional footballer who played as a forward.

== Career ==
Jésum emerged as champion of the second division in Villa Nova AC in 1971, and played for several Brazilian clubs from then on, most notably Cruzeiro and Grêmio, where he managed to become state champion.

== Honours ==
Villa Nova

- Campeonato Brasileiro Série B: 1971

Cruzeiro

- Campeonato Mineiro: 1975

Bahia

- Campeonato Baiano: 1978

Grêmio

- Campeonato Gaúcho: 1979, 1980

Individual

- 1978 Bola de Prata
