= New Republic Party =

New Republic Party may refer to:

- New Republic Party (South Africa), a former political party in South Africa
- New Republic (Romania), a political party in Romania
- New Republic Party (Costa Rica), a political party in Costa Rica

== See also ==
- New Republican Party (Malawi), a political party
- New Republican Force (Bolivia), a political party
- Union for the New Republic (France), a political party
- Union for the New Republic (Gabon), a political party
- Union for the New Republic (Guinea), a political party
- Democratic Union for the New Republic (Italy), a political party
- New Republic (disambiguation)
- Republican Party (disambiguation)
