= Port of Santarém =

Port in the city of Paranaguá, Brazil

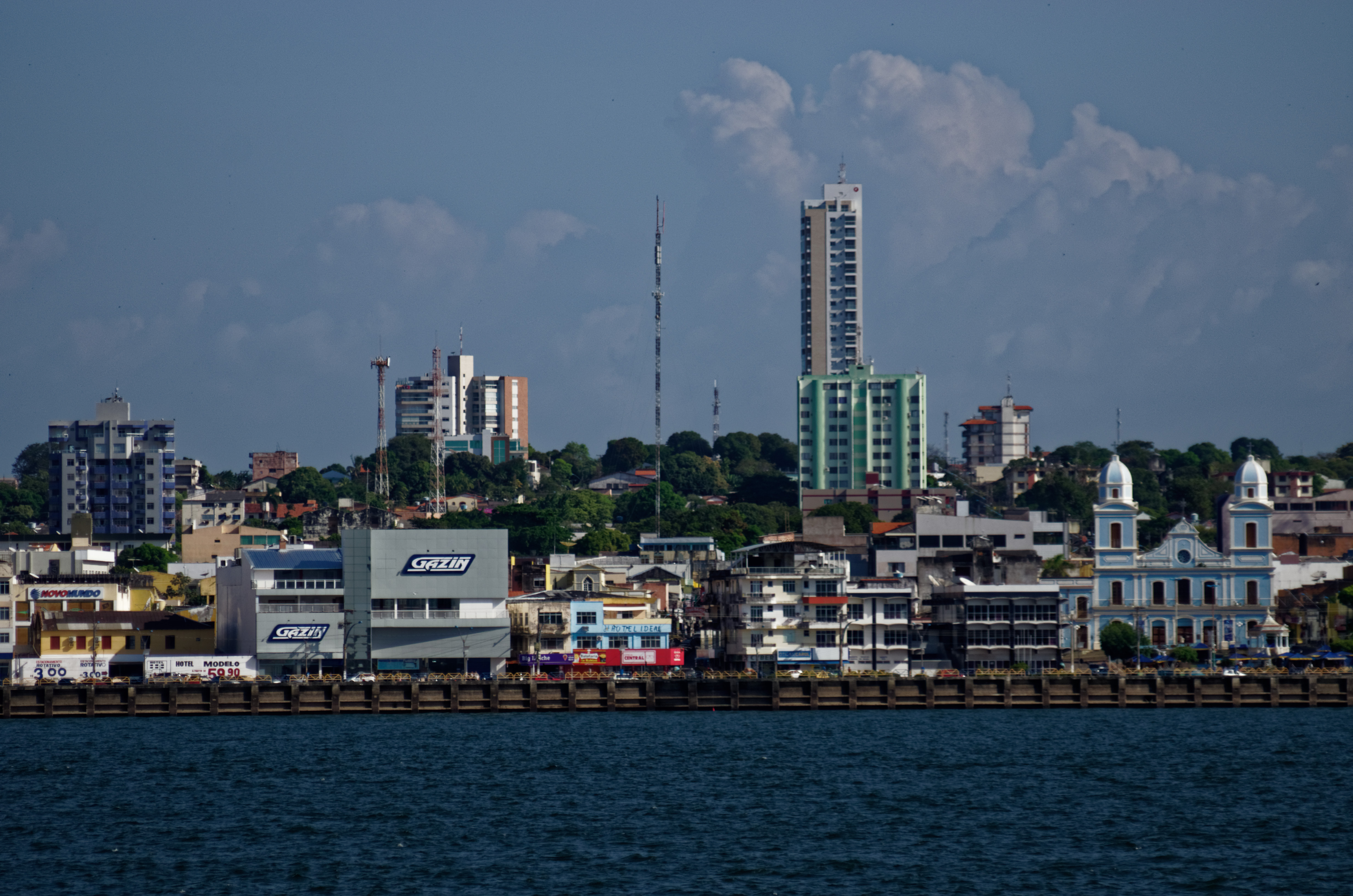
- Interactive map of Port of Santarém
- Location within Pará Location within Brazil

Location
- Country: Brazil
- Location: Santarém, Pará
- Coordinates: 2°25′2″S 54°44′05″W

Details
- Opened: February 11, 1974
- Owned by: Companhia Docas do Pará
- Type of Harbor: River port
- Size: 500.000 m²

Statistics
- Annual cargo tonnage: 12 million tonnes (2019)

The Port of Santarém is a river port in Brazil. It's located in the city of Santarém, in the Brazilian state of Pará. It is located at Ponta do Salé, on the right bank of the Tapajós River, about 3 km from the confluence with the Amazon River and a river distance of 876 km from Belém.

== History ==
The port construction proposal came from the National Integration Plan, put into practice in the early 1970s by the military government, which provided for the construction of the BR-230 and BR-163 highways, and that had as anchor of this plan the construction of a federal port in Santarém, that would make possible the flow of raw materials and goods with the region of the Low and Middle Amazonas. The port was inaugurated on February 11, 1974, receiving cargo and passenger ships, which used, in a precarious way, the old municipal warehouse of Santarém.

== Present ==
The Port of Santarém is intended for operation with solid bulk and general cargo. It operates with solid bulks of vegetable origin and fertilizer, liquid bulk derived from petroleum (fuels and LPG), passengers (river and cruise ships) and general cargo. In the years 2015 and 2016, among the relevant loads, the Santarém Complex handled 4.5 million and 4.3 million tons, respectively, of solid vegetable bulk, including soy and corn cargo. Grain movement in Porto occurs in two directions: inland shipping landings and exports, with 80% of the cargo originating in Porto Velho (Rondônia), where grains from Mato Grosso and Rondônia are handled, and 20% of the cargo comes from Miritituba, Pará, which moves grain from Mato Grosso. The total landed for inland navigation is exported, as well as a portion of grain from Pará that arrives via the highway. Soy is mainly destined for China, the United Kingdom, the Netherlands, France, Spain and Italy and, to a lesser extent, Saudi Arabia, Germany, Egypt and Algeria. Corn, on the other hand, is exported to more diverse destinations, with an emphasis on: Algeria, Egypt and the Dominican Republic.

Maritime access is carried out by the Tapajós and Amazonas rivers. Road access via BR-163 and BR-230 are the options. There is no rail access, however, investment is expected in this mode, with the construction of Ferrogrão.

The total paving of the BR-163, completed at the end of 2019, has been increasing demand for the Port of Santarém, as it is about 1000 km from the state of Mato Grosso (the largest producer of soy, corn and cotton in the country), a shorter route than the 2000 km in the direction to the Port of Santos. In 2019, it ranked first among the 19 terminals that saw growth in the volume of cargo handled across the country. It transported more than 12 million tons this year.
