= Sport Club Belém =

Sport Belém
- Full name: Sport Club Belém
- Nicknames: Dragão da Maracangalha; Brasinha; Rubro Negro
- Founded: December 2, 1965
- Ground: Mangueirão, Belém, Pará state, Brazil
- Capacity: 45,007
- League: Campeonato Paraense Série A3
Home colours	Away colours

Sport Club Belém, commonly known as Sport Belém, is a Brazilian football club based in Belém. They competed in the Série B twice.

== History ==
The club was founded on December 2, 1965. They competed in the Série B in 1971 and 1986, and were eliminated in the first stage of both tournaments.

In 2008, they won the Campeonato Paraense Second Division.

== Stadium ==
Sport Club Belém play their home games at Estádio Olímpico do Pará, nicknamed Mangueirão. The stadium has a maximum capacity of 45,007 people.
