= 1971 Campeonato Brasileiro Série B =

Campeonato Brasileiro Série B
- Season: 1971
- Champions: Villa Nova
- Top goalscorer: Robilota (Remo) - 4 goals
- Biggest home win: CRB 6-1 Náutico (September 12, 1971); Sampaio Corrêa 5-0 Maranhão (September 26, 1971)
- Biggest away win: Sport Belém 0-5 Remo (October 27, 1971)

The football (soccer) Campeonato Brasileiro Série B 1971, the second level of Brazilian National League, was played from September 12 to December 22, 1971. The competition had 23 clubs. The tournament consisted in a fusion of the already existing Torneio Centro-Sul and the Copa Norte-Nordeste, with the champions of each tournament facing off in the finals.

Villa Nova beat Remo on the finals, and was declared 1971 Brazilian Série B champions. The relegation and promotion system hadn't been implemented yet, so no clubs were promoted.

== Stages of the competition ==
=== First phase ===
Group A

Pos	Team	Pld	W	D	L	GF	GA	GD	Pts	Qualification
1	(Ceará) Ferroviário-CE	6	4	1	1	12	7	+5	9	Qualified to the Second phase
2	(Paraíba) Campinense	5	3	0	2	5	5	0	6	
3	(Rio Grande do Norte) ABC	5	1	1	3	8	10	−2	3	
4	(Pernambuco) Ferroviário-PE (Note: Ferroviário-PE didn't play its last two matches, against Campinense and ABC.)	4	0	2	2	5	8	−3	2	

Notes:

Group B

Pos	Team	Pld	W	D	L	GF	GA	GD	Pts	Qualification
1	(Sergipe) Itabaiana	4	2	1	1	7	5	+2	5	Qualified to the Second phase
2	(Alagoas) CRB	4	2	0	2	9	7	+2	4	
3	(Pernambuco) Náutico	4	1	1	2	5	9	−4	3	

Group C

Pos	Team	Pld	W	D	L	GF	GA	GD	Pts	Qualification
1	(Piauí) Flamengo-PI	8	5	2	1	12	7	+5	12	Qualified to the Second phase
2	(Maranhão) Sampaio Corrêa	8	5	1	2	16	8	+8	11	
3	(Piauí) River	8	5	0	3	12	8	+4	10	
4	(Ceará) Guarany de Sobral	8	2	2	4	8	12	−4	6	
5	Maranhão	8	0	1	7	3	16	−13	1	

Group D

Pos	Team	Pld	W	D	L	GF	GA	GD	Pts	Qualification
1	(Pará) Remo	6	3	2	1	7	1	+6	8	Qualified to the Second phase
2	(Pará) Tuna Luso	6	2	4	0	5	1	+4	8	
3	(Pará) Paysandu	6	1	3	2	3	5	−2	5	
4	(Pará) Sport Belém	6	1	1	4	2	10	−8	3	

Group E

Pos	Team	Pld	W	D	L	GF	GA	GD	Pts	Qualification
1	(São Paulo (state)) Ponte Preta	4	2	2	0	6	1	+5	6	Qualified to the Second phase
2	(Santa Catarina (state)) América-SC	4	1	2	1	3	3	0	4	
3	(Paraná (state)) Londrina	4	0	2	2	3	8	−5	2	

=== Second phase ===
Group 1

Pos	Team	Pld	W	D	L	GF	GA	GD	Pts	Qualification
1	(São Paulo (state)) Ponte Preta	2	2	0	0	5	0	+5	4	Qualified to the semifinals
2	(Mato Grosso) Mixto (Note: Mixto had previously received a bye to the Second phase)	2	0	0	2	0	5	−5	0	

Notes:

Group 2

Pos	Team	Pld	W	D	L	GF	GA	GD	Pts	Qualification
1	(Minas Gerais) Villa Nova (Note: Villa Nova had previously received a bye to the Second phase)	2	1	1	0	3	2	+1	3	Qualified to the semifinals
2	(Rio de Janeiro (state)) Central-RJ (Note: Central-RJ had previously received a bye to the Second phase)	2	0	1	1	2	3	−1	1	

Notes:

Group 3

Pos	Team	Pld	W	D	L	GF	GA	GD	Pts	Qualification
1	(Pará) Remo	2	2	0	0	5	2	+3	4	Qualified to the semifinals
2	(Amazonas (Brazilian state)) Rodoviária-AM (Note: Rodoviária-AM had previously received a bye to the Second phase)	2	0	0	2	2	5	−3	0	

Notes:

Group 4

Pos	Team	Pld	W	D	L	GF	GA	GD	Pts	Qualification
1	(Sergipe) Itabaiana	4	2	1	1	7	4	+3	5	Qualified to the semifinals
2	(Ceará) Ferroviário-CE	4	1	2	1	3	3	0	4	
3	(Piauí) Flamengo-PI	4	1	1	2	4	7	−3	3	

=== Semifinals ===
Teams			Scores		Tie-breaker
Team 1	Points	Team 2	1st leg	2nd leg	3rd leg
Itabaiana (Sergipe)	1:3	(Pará) Remo	0:0	0:2	—
Villa Nova (Minas Gerais)	2:2	(São Paulo (state)) Ponte Preta	1:0	0:1	1:1

=== Finals ===
15 December 1971

Remo (Pará)	1 – 0	(Minas Gerais) Villa Nova
Ernani

Baenão, Belém (PA)
Referee: (Pernambuco) Armindo Tavares
19 December 1971

Villa Nova (Minas Gerais)	3 – 0	(Pará) Remo
Dias 5'; Jésum 22'; Paulinho 46'

Estádio Independência, Belo Horizonte (MG)
Referee: (São Paulo (state)) Oscar Scolfaro

22 December 1971

Villa Nova (Minas Gerais)	2 – 1	(Pará) Remo
Mário Lourenço 49' (pen.) 78' (pen.)		Cabecinha 9'

Estádio Independência, Belo Horizonte (MG)
Referee: (São Paulo (state)) Oscar Scolfaro

== Sources ==
- http://www.rsssfbrasil.com/tablesae/br1971l2.htm
