= La República (disambiguation) =

La República (Spanish for "The Republic") may refer to the following newspapers:

- La República, a Peruvian newspaper based in Lima
- La República (Colombia), a Colombian newspaper based in Bogotá
- La República (Costa Rica), a Costa Rican newspaper based in San José
- La República (Uruguay), a Uruguayan newspaper based in Montevideo

== See also ==
- la Repubblica, an Italian newspaper based in Rome
- Colegio La República, a Chilean high school located in Rancagua
- Republica (disambiguation)
