= Alter do Chão, Pará =

Beach in Santarém, Pará, Brazil

Coordinates: 2°31′S 54°57′W

Alter do Chão is one of the administrative districts of the city of Santarém, in Pará state located on the right bank of the Tapajós. The distance to the city center about 37 kilometres across the highway Everaldo Martins (PA-457). It is the main tourist spot of Santarém, it houses the most beautiful freshwater beach in the world according to the British newspaper The Guardian, and is popularly known as the Brazilian Caribbean.

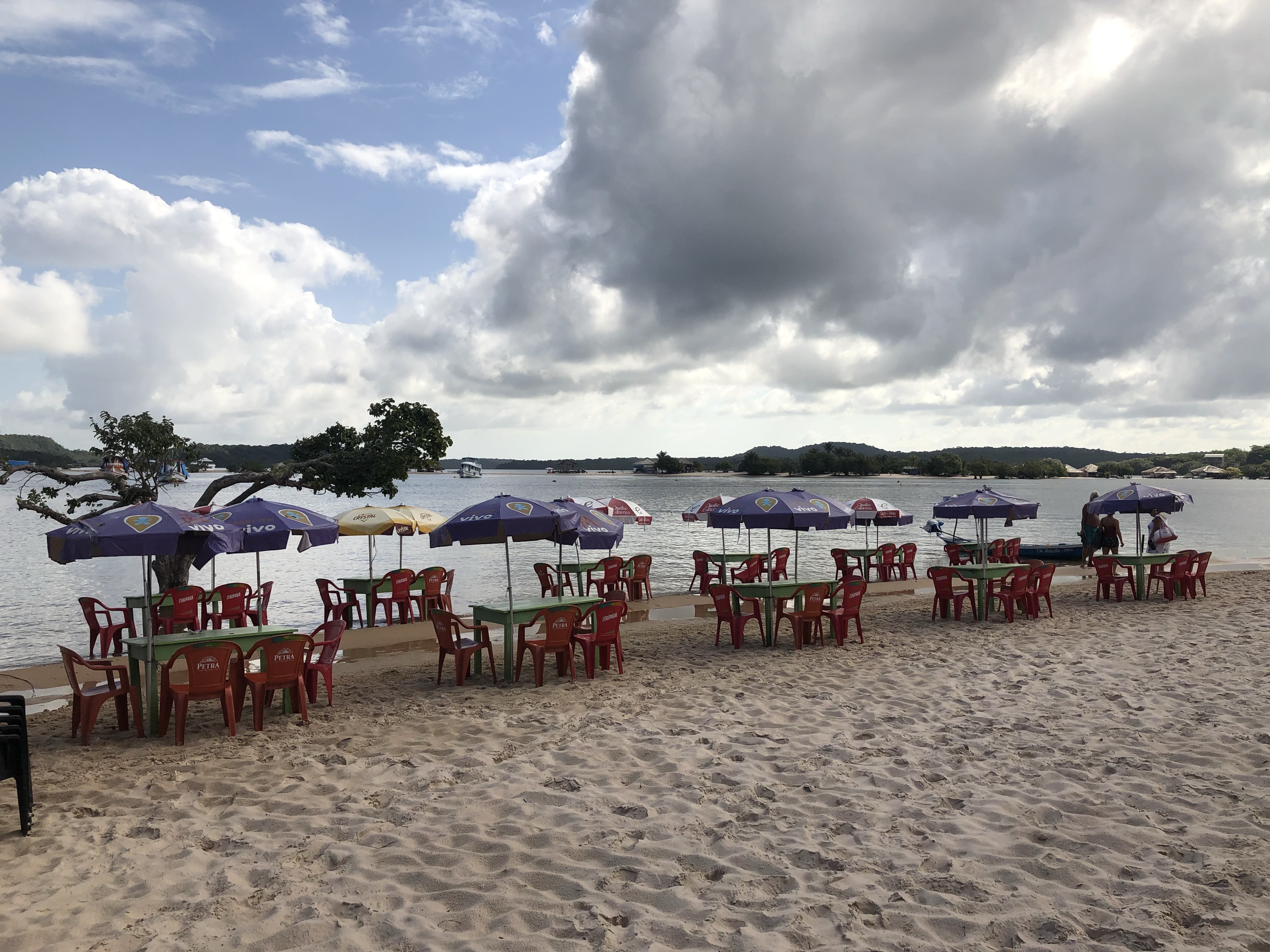
Beach at Alter do Chão

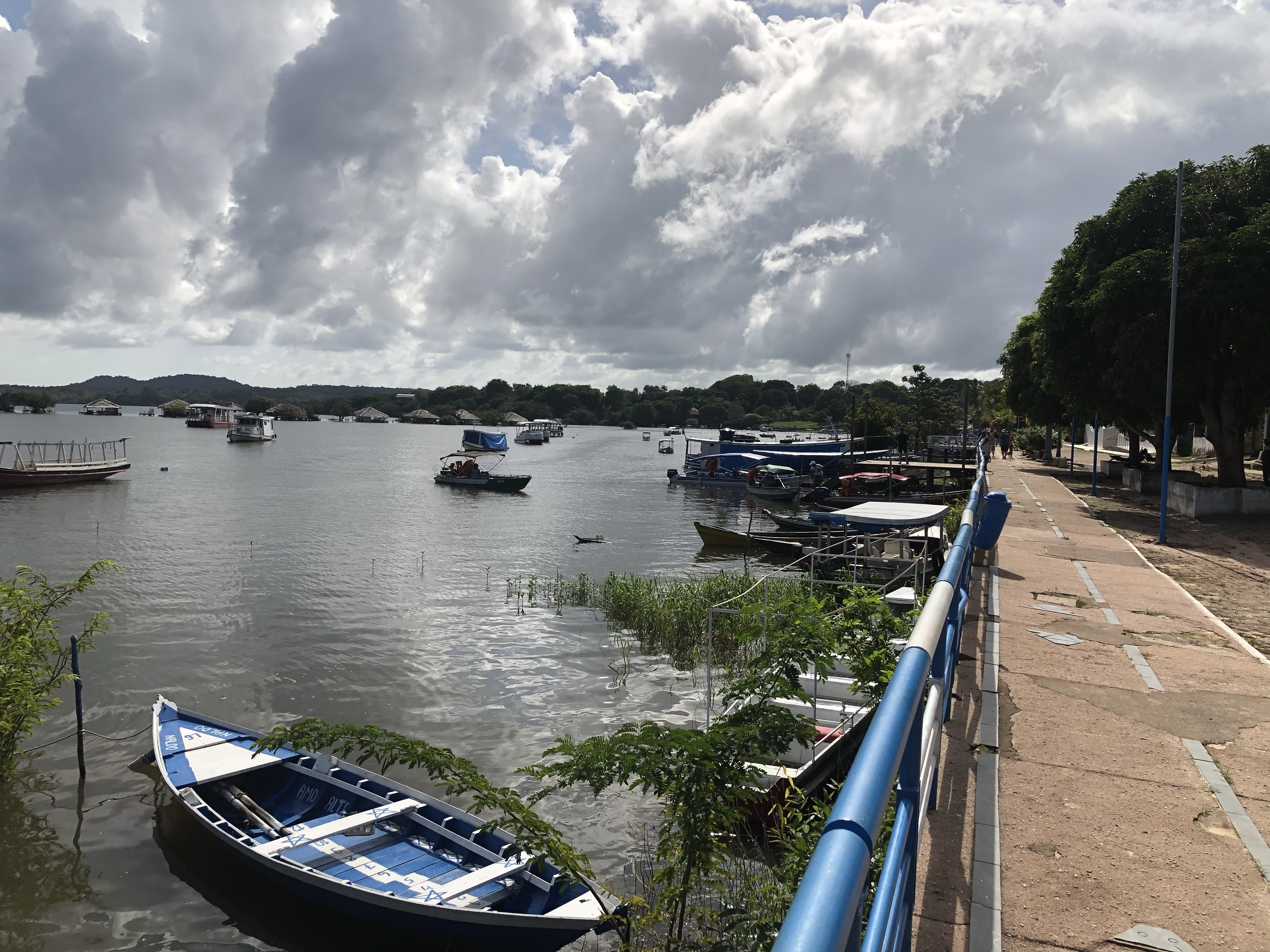
Riverside walk

== Etymology ==
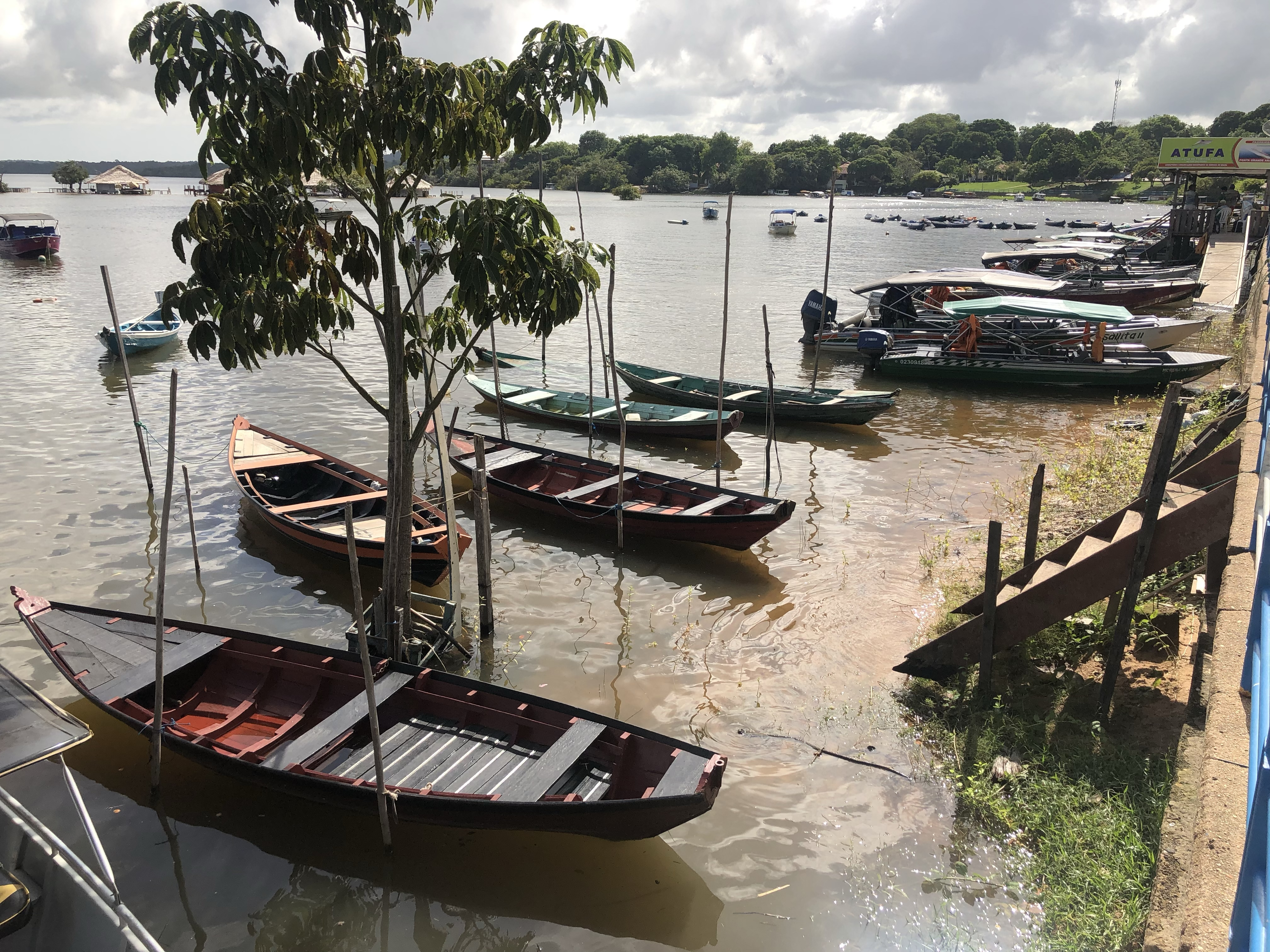
Riverside

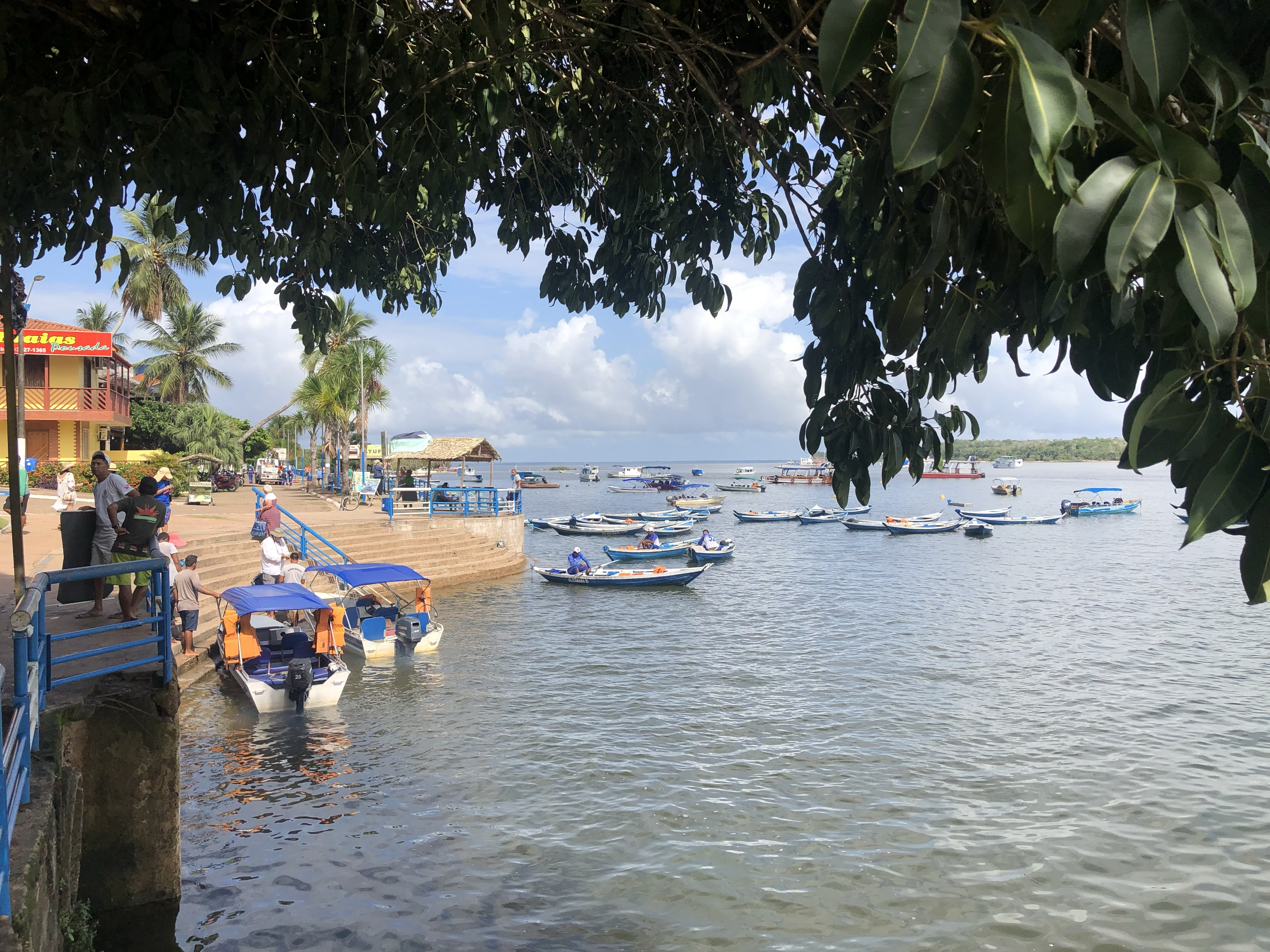
Boat landing

The name is a tribute to the Portuguese town of Alter do Chão.

== History ==
Founded on March 6, 1626, by Portuguese Pedro Teixeira, it was elevated to a town by Francisco Xavier de Mendonça Furtado, governor of the State of Grão-Pará and Maranhão, during Colonial Brazil, on March 6, 1758.

Alter do Chão, during the 17th century and 18th century, received several religious missions, led by the Jesuits of the Franciscan order. The cult of Our Lady of Remedies was established. This became the patron saint of this holy place.

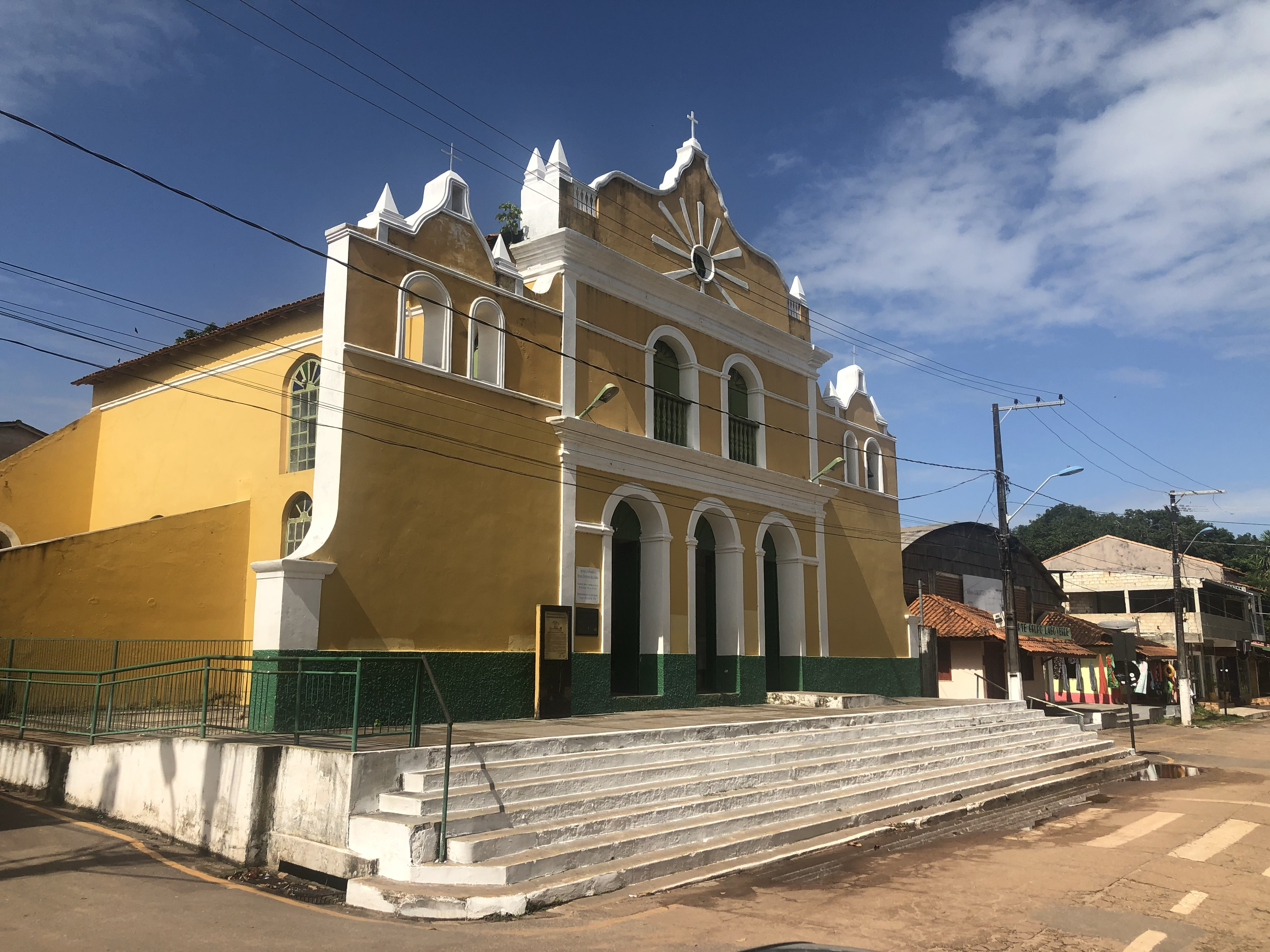
Church

Until the 18th century, the village was inhabited mostly by indigenous communities Boraris. It still has traces of the natives because of the existence of several sites with many pottery shards, pipes, and polished stone axes.

In the early 20th century, Alter do Chao was one of the transportation routes of latex extracted from rubber trees Belterra and Fordlandia. It was a short period of development for the town. In the 1950s the decay of Amazonian extraction began, and the village was hit by the economic deficit. From the 1990s to the present day, the district focuses on tourism to evolve economically, which has achieved good results.

== Tourism ==
Alter do Chão is a popular tourist destination among both locals and foreigners, primarily due to its pristine beaches and proximity to the Amazon jungle.

During the low river season, from August to January, the region reveals extensive stretches of fine, sparkling sand beaches along the Tapajós River.

In contrast, the flood season, from February to July, transforms the landscape with flooded forests, offering unique opportunities for wildlife observation, as animals tend to be more active and visible during this time.

Visitors during the transition between these seasons, such as mid-January, can experience a mix of both: receding waters revealing hidden beaches, while some areas begin to flood, showcasing the dynamic beauty of the region's natural environment.

=== Sairé Festival ===
Alter do Chão

Sairé is the most traditional popular festival in the Amazon rainforest.

The Festa do Sairé in Alter do Chão, mixes Catholic religious elements with expressions of local culture for locals and tourists. It is held every September.

There are processions, Caiibó groups, and dramatizations of Amazonian legends, such as the legend of the boto.

Finally, there is an amusing dispute between the Cor de Rosa and Tucuxi dolphins, groups with allegories, songs and costumes, such as the samba schools.

The Festival dos Botos was incorporated into Sairé in the 1970s and resembles the Festival dos Bois de Parintins (AM).
