= Republic (peak) =

Landform of the Greater Caucasus in Azerbaijan

Highest point
- Elevation: 3,740 m (12,270 ft)

Naming
- Etymology: Arabic
- Native name: Cümhuriyyət (Azerbaijani)

Geography
- Location: Gusar Raion, Azerbaijan
- Parent range: Greater Caucasus

Republic (Azerbaijani: Cümhuriyyət) is a high peak in Gusar District of Azerbaijan. It is part of the Greater Caucasus mountain range, with a summit elevation of 12,270 feet (3,740 m) above sea level. The peak was named Republic and a monument was built on the peak dedicated to 100th anniversary of the Azerbaijan Democratic Republic on 28 May. A road to the mountain peak was opened on 3 May, while the first climb occurred on 28 May, 2018. The project was part of the Azerbaijani President Ilham Aliyev's "Year of the Republic" order.
