= Campeonato Paraense Série A3 =

Football league in Pará, Brazil

Campeonato Paraense Third Division
- Organising body: FPF
- Founded: 2023; 2 years ago
- Country: Brazil
- State: Pará
- Level on pyramid: 3
- Promotion to: Campeonato Paraense Série A2
- Current champions: Atlético Paraense (1st title) (2025)
- Most championships: Amazônia Independente and Pinheirense (1 title each)
- Website: FPF Official website

The Campeonato Paraense Third Division, also called Campeonato Paraense Série A3 (former B2), is the third tier of the professional state football league in the Brazilian state of Pará. It is run by the Pará Football Federation (FPF). It established in 2023 season.

== List of champions ==
Season	Champions	Runners-up
2023	Pinheirense (1)	Paraense
2024	Amazônia Independente (1)	Fonte Nova
2025	Atlético Paraense (1)	Santos Athletico

=== Titles by team ===
Teams in bold still active.

Rank	Club	Winners	Winning years
1	**Amazônia Independente**	1	2024
1	**Atlético Paraense**	1	2025
1	**Pinheirense**	1	2023

=== By city ===
City	Championships	Clubs
Belém	1	Pinheirense (1)
Parauapebas	1	Atlético Paraense (1)
Santarém	1	Amazônia Independente (1)
