= Nova República =

Neighborhood in Brazil

Nova República (in English, "New Republic") is a district in the city of Santarém, Pará and is about 5 km to the South from the center. It is part of Grande Área da Nova República (English: Great Area of the New Republic), being the most populous and important.
