= Salinópolis =

Municipality in Northern Brazil

- Municipality
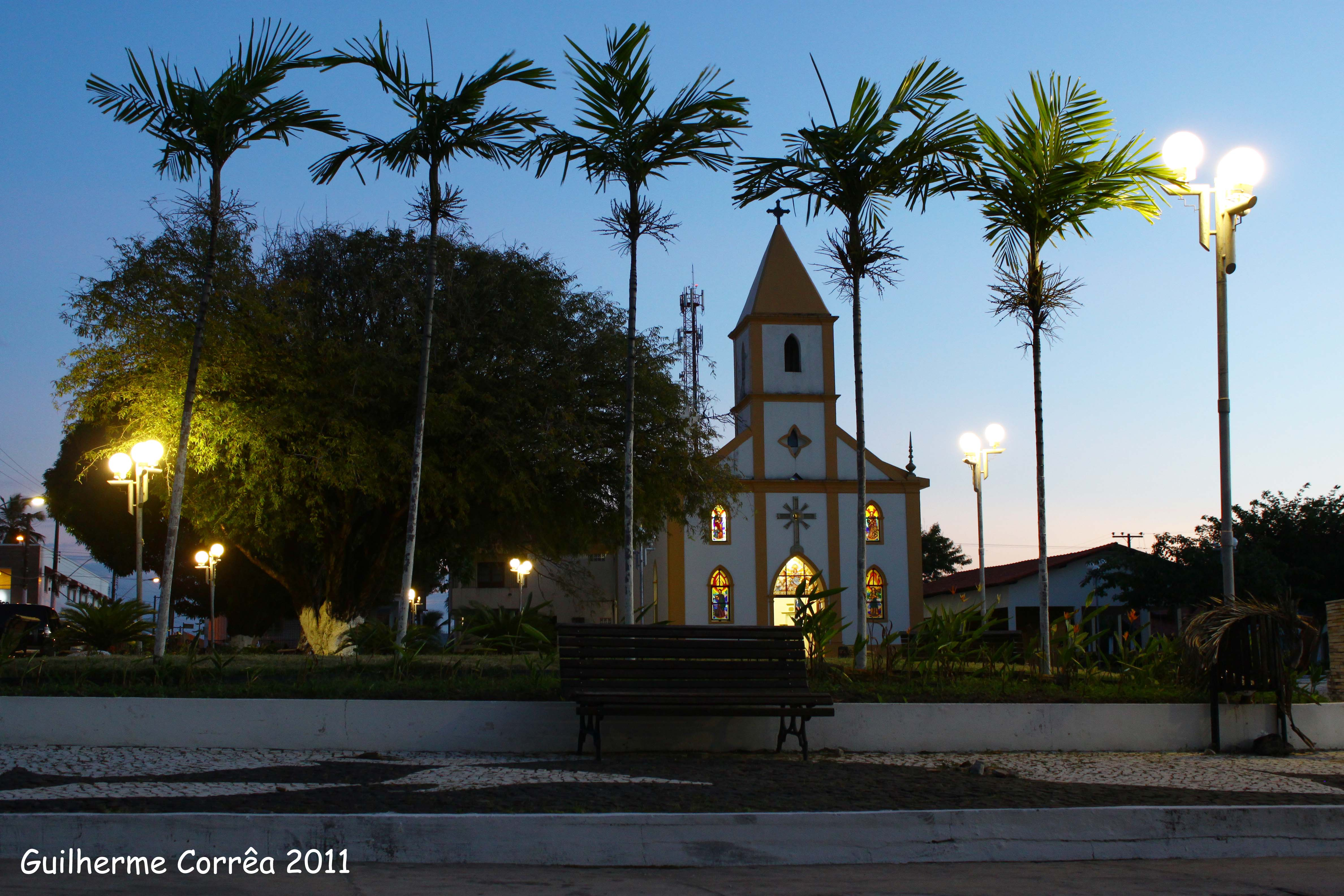

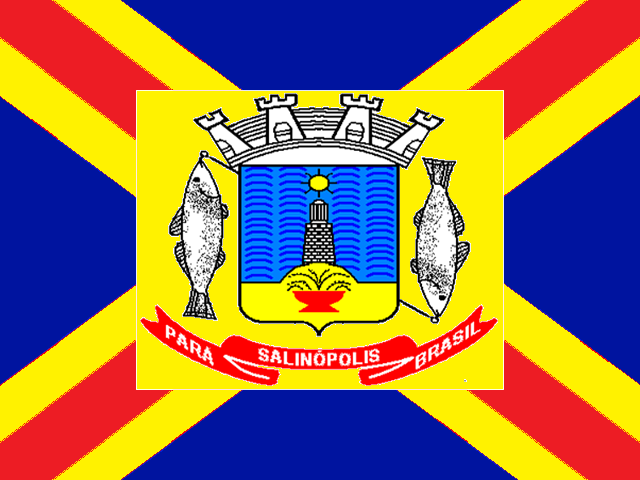
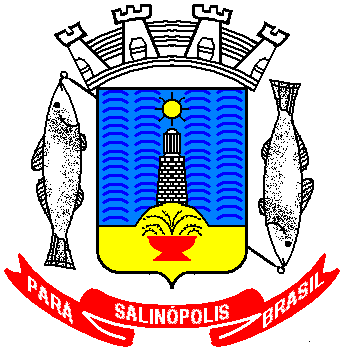
- Flag Coat of arms

- Location in Brazil Salinópolis (Brazil)
- Coordinates: 0.6276°S 47.3456°W
- Country: Brazil
- Region: Northern
- State: Pará
- Mesoregion: Nordeste Paraense

Area
  - Total: 84,115 sq mi (217,856 km^{2})
- Elevation: 69 ft (21 m)

Population (2020)
  - Total: 40,922
- Time zone: UTC−3 (BRT)
- Area code: 91

Salinópolis is a municipality in the state of Pará in the Northern region of Brazil.

== Climate ==
Salinópolis has a tropical monsoon climate (Am) with moderate to little rainfall from July to December and heavy to very heavy rainfall from January to June.

Climate data for Salinópolis
Month	Jan	Feb	Mar	Apr	May	Jun	Jul	Aug	Sep	Oct	Nov	Dec	Year
Mean daily maximum °C (°F)	30.3 (86.5)	29.1 (84.4)	28.7 (83.7)	30.2 (86.4)	30.6 (87.1)	30.8 (87.4)	30.9 (87.6)	31.3 (88.3)	31.9 (89.4)	32.4 (90.3)	32.4 (90.3)	31.6 (88.9)	30.9 (87.5)
Daily mean °C (°F)	26.3 (79.3)	25.7 (78.3)	25.6 (78.1)	26.3 (79.3)	26.3 (79.3)	26.3 (79.3)	26.3 (79.3)	26.5 (79.7)	26.8 (80.2)	27.1 (80.8)	27.2 (81.0)	26.9 (80.4)	26.4 (79.6)
Mean daily minimum °C (°F)	22.3 (72.1)	22.4 (72.3)	22.5 (72.5)	22.4 (72.3)	22.0 (71.6)	21.8 (71.2)	21.7 (71.1)	21.8 (71.2)	21.8 (71.2)	21.9 (71.4)	22.1 (71.8)	22.2 (72.0)	22.1 (71.7)
Average rainfall mm (inches)	366 (14.4)	430 (16.9)	585 (23.0)	599 (23.6)	383 (15.1)	173 (6.8)	130 (5.1)	68 (2.7)	16 (0.6)	9 (0.4)	13 (0.5)	91 (3.6)	2,863 (112.7)
Source: Climate-Data.org

== Transportation ==
Salinópolis is served by Salinópolis Airport.

== See also ==
- List of municipalities in Pará
