= Fourth Republic =

Fourth Republic may refer to:

== Governments ==
=== Africa ===
- Fourth Republic of Uganda, since 1986
- Fourth Republic of Ghana, since 1993
- Fourth Republic of Niger, 1996–1999
- Fourth Nigerian Republic, since 1999
- Fourth Republic of Madagascar, since 2010

=== Americas ===
- Fourth Republic of Venezuela, 1953–1999
- Fourth Brazilian Republic, 1946–1964
- Fourth Dominican Republic, since 1965

=== Asia ===
- Fourth Philippine Republic, 1972–1986
- Fourth Republic of Korea, 1972–1981
- Fourth Cambodian Republic, 1989–1992

=== Europe ===
- French Fourth Republic (1946–1958)
- Fourth Czechoslovak Republic (1948–1990)

== Other uses ==
- 4th Republic, a 2019 Nigerian political drama film
- Fourth Polish Republic, a campaign slogan used by Law and Justice in the 2005 parliamentary elections
- 4K! – Fourth Republic!, a former left-wing Hungarian political part that existed from 2012 to 2016

== See also ==
- First Republic
- Second Republic
- Third Republic
- Fifth Republic
- Sixth Republic
- Seventh Republic
