= First Republic =

First Republic may refer to:

== Businesses ==
- First Republic Bank, of San Francisco, California, U.S.
- First Republic Bank Corporation, of Dallas, Texas, U.S.

== Governments ==
=== Africa ===
- First Egyptian Republic (1953–1958)
- First Republic of Madagascar (1958–1972)
- First Republic of Ghana (1960–1966)
- First Republic in the Constitution of Niger (1960–1989)
- First Nigerian Republic (1963–1966)
- First Republic of Uganda (1963–1971)
- First Republic of Sierra Leone (1971–1992)

=== Americas ===
- First Vermont Republic (1777–1791)
- First Republic of Venezuela (1811–1812)
- First Mexican Republic (1824–1835)
- First Dominican Republic (1844–1861)
- First Costa Rican Republic (1848–1948)
- First Brazilian Republic (1889–1930)
- First Republic of New Granada, Colombia (1810–1816)

=== Asia ===
- First Philippine Republic (1899–1901)
- First Republic of Armenia (1918–1920)
- First Republic of Azerbaijan (1918–1920)
- First Republic of Georgia, also known as the "Democratic Republic of Georgia" (1918–1921)
- First Syrian Republic (1930–1950)
- First East Turkestan Republic (1933–1934)
- First Republic of Korea (1948–1960)
- First Republic of the Maldives (1952–1954)
- First Republic of Vietnam (1955–1963)
- First Cambodian Republic (1970–1975)
- First Republic of Afghanistan, also known as the "Republic of Afghanistan" (1973–1978)

=== Europe ===
- Roman Republic, established c. 508 BC, first to use the term
- First Polish Republic, an informal term for the Polish–Lithuanian Commonwealth (1569–1795)
- French First Republic (1792–1804)
- First Hellenic Republic, sometimes used for Greece during the War of Independence (1822–1832)
- First Spanish Republic (1873–1874)
- First Portuguese Republic (1910–1926)
- First Hungarian Republic (1918–1920)
- First Czechoslovak Republic (1918–1938)
- First Austrian Republic (1919–1934)
- First Slovak Republic (1939–1945)
- First Italian Republic (1948–1994)
- First Republic of Kosovo (1991–1999)

== Other uses ==
- 1st Republic (TV series), a South Korean television show
- First Republic Square, Tbilisi, Georgia
- The First Republic, a Czech television show

== See also ==
- Republic First Bancorp, of Philadelphia, Pennsylvania, U.S.
- Second Republic
- Third Republic
- Fourth Republic
- Fifth Republic
- Sixth Republic
- Seventh Republic
- People's republic
