= French ship Républicain =

Six ships of the French Navy have borne the name Républicain ("Revolutionary"):

- Royal Louis, a 110-gun ship of the line, was renamed Républicain in 1792.
- French corvette Républicain (1793), a 20-gun corvette (1793–1794)
- French lugger Républicain (1793), a 10-gun lugger (1793–1796)
- French fluyt Républicain (1795), a fluyt (1795)
- Mont Blanc, a Téméraire-class ship of the line, bore the name between 1795 and 1796
- Majestueux, a 110-gun Terrible-class ship of the line, was renamed Républicain in 1797.

Five ships of the French Navy have borne the name Républicaine ("Revolutionary"):

- Républicaine, a 4-gun felucca (1793–1799)
- French corvette Républicaine (1794), a 24-gun Unité-class corvette (1794–1799)
- Républicaine, a lugger (1794–1795)
- French corvette Républicaine (1795), an 18-gun corvette
- French fluyt Républicaine (1795), an 18-gun fluyt
- French frigate Républicaine française (1794), a 32-gun Galathée-class frigate (1794–1796)

Two ships of the French Navy have borne the name République française:

- République française, a 120-gun ship of the line
- République française (1795), a tartane

The frigate Hermione was started as République italienne

== See also ==
- French ship République
  - French battleship République
    - République-class battleship
