= Second Republic =

Second Republic can refer to:

== Governments ==
=== Africa ===
- Second Congolese Republic (1965-1997)
- Second Republic of Ghana (1969–1972)
- Second Republic of Uganda (1971–1979)
- Second Republic of Madagascar, also known as the "Democratic Republic of Madagascar" (1975–1993)
- Second Nigerian Republic (1979–1983)
- Second Republic in the Constitution of Niger (1989–1992)
- Second Republic of Sierra Leone (1996–1997)

=== Americas ===
- Second Republic of Venezuela (1813–1814)
- Second Mexican Republic (1846–1863)
- Second Dominican Republic (1865–1916)
- Second Brazilian Republic (1930–1937)
- Second Costa Rican Republic, since 1948

=== Asia ===
- Second Philippine Republic (1943–1945)
- Second East Turkestan Republic (1944–1949)
- Second Syrian Republic (1950–1958, 1961–1963)
- Second Republic of Korea (1960–1961)
- Second Republic of Vietnam (1963–1975)
- Second Republic of the Maldives, since 1968
- Second Cambodian Republic (1975–1979)
- Republic of Kazakhstan under Kassym-Jomart Tokayev, since 2022 after the Bloody January

=== Europe ===
- Second Roman Republic, also known as the "Commune of Rome" (1144–1193)
- French Second Republic (1848–1852)
- Second Polish Republic (1918–1949)
- Second Armenian Republic, or Armenian Soviet Socialist Republic (1920–1991)
- Second Hellenic Republic (1924–1935)
- Second Spanish Republic (1931–1939)
- Portuguese Second Republic, also known as the "Estado Novo" (1933–1974)
- Second Czechoslovak Republic (1938–1939)
- Second Austrian Republic, the current state, from 1945 onwards
- Second Hungarian Republic (1946–1949)
- Second Slovak Republic, the current state, from 1993 onwards
- Second Italian Republic, since 1994
- Second Republic of Kosovo, since 2008

== Other uses ==
- Second Republic (campaign group), a campaign group for political reform in Ireland

== See also ==
- First Republic
- Third Republic
- Fourth Republic
- Fifth Republic
- Sixth Republic
- Seventh Republic
