= Clube Atlético Vila Rica =

Vila Rica
- Full name: Clube Atlético Vila Rica
- Nickname(s): Cachorro doido
- Founded: June 27, 1987
- Ground: Mangueirão, Belém, Pará state, Brazil
- Capacity: 45,007
Home colours	Away colours

Clube Atlético Vila Rica, commonly known as Vila Rica, is a Brazilian football club based in Belém, Pará state.

== History ==
The club was founded on June 27, 1987. Vila Rica won the Campeonato Paraense Second Level in 1995, 2001, 2007.

== Honours ==
- Campeonato Paraense Second Division
  - Winners (1): 1995, 2001, 2007
- Taça ACLEP
  - Winners (1): 2008

== Stadium ==
Clube Atlético Vila Rica play their home games at Estádio Olímpico do Pará, nicknamed Mangueirão. The stadium has a maximum capacity of 45,007 people.
