= Third Republic =

Third Republic may refer to:

== Governments ==
Sorted by continent. Ordered by year founded, then year collapsed, then alphabetical.

=== Africa ===
- Third Republic of Uganda (1979–1986)
- Third Republic of Ghana (1979–1993)
- Third Republic in the history of Niger (1992–1996)
- Third Nigerian Republic, planned for 1993, but never established
- Third Republic of Madagascar (1993–2010)

=== Americas ===
- Third Republic of Venezuela (1817–1819)
- Third Dominican Republic (1924–1965)
- Third Brazilian Republic (1937–1946)

=== Asia ===
- Third Philippine Republic (1946–1972)
- Third Republic of Korea (1963–1972)
- Third Cambodian Republic, also known as the "People's Republic of Kampuchea" (1979–1989)
- Third Republic of Vietnam (1990–present), a South Vietnamese government in exile
- Third Syrian Republic (1963–2024)

=== Europe ===
- French Third Republic (1870–1940)
- Third Czechoslovak Republic (1945–1948)
- Third Hellenic Republic of Greece, since 1974
- Third Portuguese Republic, since 1974
- Third Hungarian Republic, since 1989
- Third Polish Republic, since 1989
- Third German Republic, since 1990
- Third Republic of Georgia, since 1990
- Third Armenian Republic, since 1993

== See also ==
- First Republic
- Second Republic
- Fourth Republic
- Fifth Republic
- Sixth Republic
- Seventh Republic
- Third Ukrainian Republic (disambiguation)
