= Fifth Republic =

Fifth Republic may refer to:

== Governments ==
=== Africa ===
- Fifth Republic of Niger (1999–2009)

=== Americas ===
- Fifth Brazilian Republic (1964–1985)
- Fifth Republic of Venezuela (1999–present)

=== Asia ===
- Fifth Republic of Korea (1981–1987)
- Fifth Republic of the Philippines (1986–present)

=== Europe ===
- Fifth Republic of Czechoslovakia (1990–1992)
- French Fifth Republic (1958–present)
- Fifth Roman Republic (1849–1850)

== Other ==
- 5th Republic (TV series), a 2005 South Korean drama series
- Fifth Republic Movement, in Venezuela

== See also ==
- First Republic
- Second Republic
- Third Republic
- Fourth Republic
- Sixth Republic
- Seventh Republic
