= Santarém, Pará =

Santarém
- Municipality
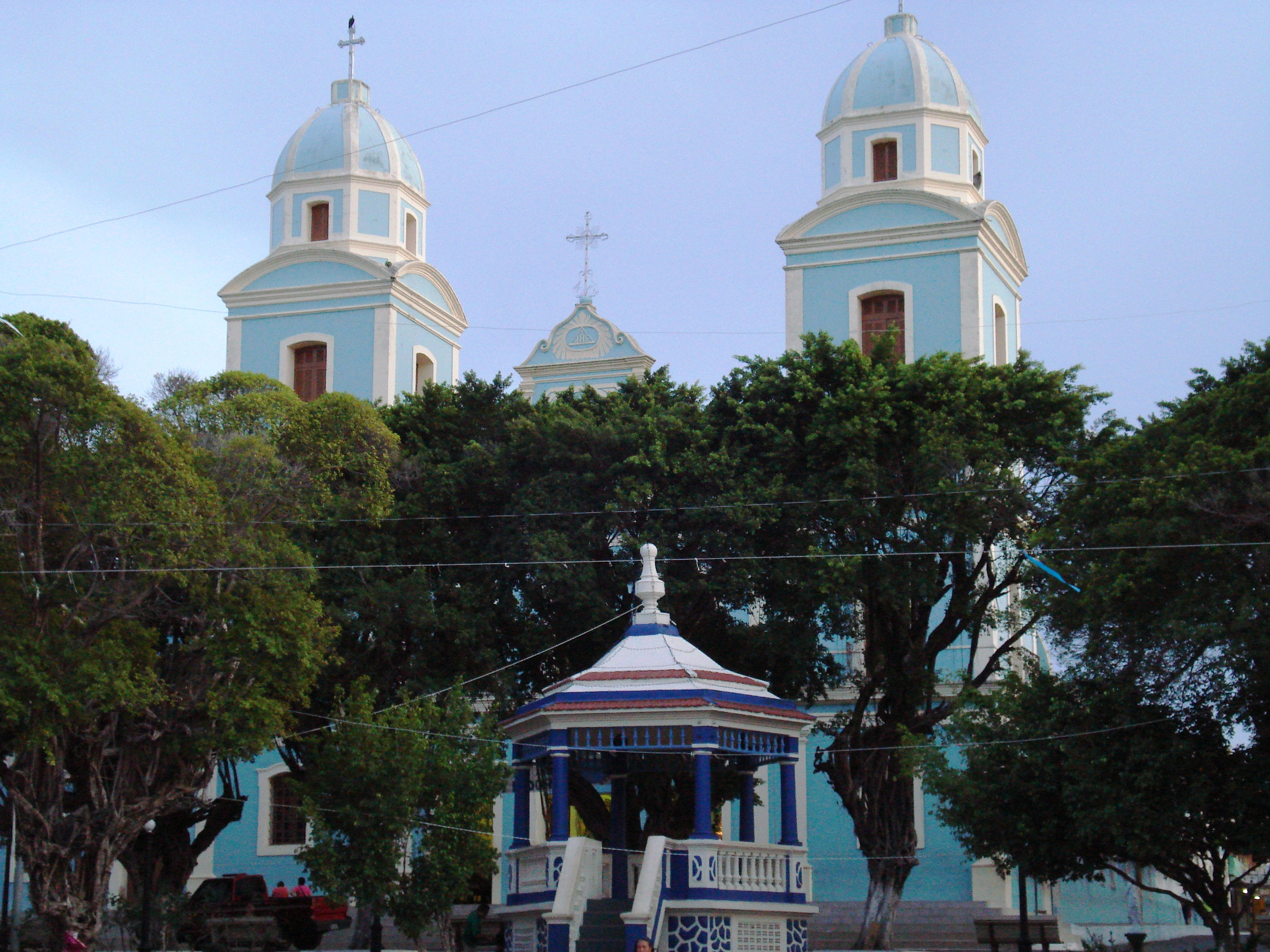
- Santarém Metropolitan Cathedral

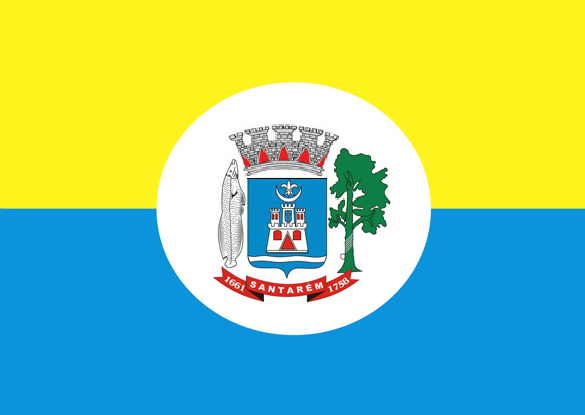
- Flag Coat of arms

- Location of Santarém municipality within Pará state

- Location in Brazil
- Coordinates: 2°25′48″S 54°43′12″W
- Country: Brazil
- Region: Northern Region
- State: Pará
- Founded: 22 June 1661

Government
  - Mayor: José Maria Tapajós (MDB)

Area
  - Total: 22,887.08 km^{2} (8,836.75 sq mi)
- Elevation: 51 m (167 ft)

Population (2022 Brazilian census)
  - Total: 331,942
  - Estimate (2025): 360,871
  - Density: 14.5035/km^{2} (37.5638/sq mi)
- Demonym: Santareno
- Time zone: UTC−3 (BRT)
- Website: https://santarem.pa.gov.br/

Santarém (Brazilian Portuguese pronunciation: [sɐ̃taˈɾẽj]) is a municipality in the western part of the state of Pará in Brazil. Located at the confluence of the Tapajós and Amazon Rivers, it has become a popular tourist destination. It is the second-most important city in the state, and the financial and economic center of the western part of the state. It leads the Santarém Metropolitan Area, made up of Santarém, Belterra and Mojuí dos Campos. It was once home to the Tapajós Indians, a tribe of Native Americans after whom the river was named. They were the leaders of a large, agricultural chiefdom that flourished before the arrival of Europeans.

It is located some 600–700 km from the two largest cities in the Brazilian Amazon: Manaus, upriver in the state of Amazonas, and the Pará state capital Belém, located downriver at the mouth of the Amazon on the Atlantic Ocean. Santarém has an estimated population of 331,942 people (2020), and is the third most populous city of the state. The city occupies an area of 22,887 km^{2} (8,837 sq mi), of which 77 km^{2} are urban areas.

The city was founded by Portuguese colonists in 1661 as New, it was discovered by Priest João Filipe Bettendorff Santarém (after the city in Portugal). It is one of the oldest cities in the Brazilian Amazon. This is the seat of the Roman Catholic Diocese of Santarém.

Because of the crystalline waters of the Tapajós River, Santarém has more than 100 km (62 mi) of natural beaches, such as those of the village of Alter do Chão, known as the "Caribbean in Brazil." The Guardian ranked this beach as the most beautiful in Brazil. Alter do Chão is also home to Sairé, one of the most important folklore festivals of the region, which is held annually in September.

Some political activists have lobbied to create a new Brazilian state by dividing the enormous state of Pará into western and eastern regions. The new state to be established in the west would be called the Tapajós, with Santarém serving as the capital.

== History ==
Cannons from the Tapajós Fortress

Mirante do Tapajós Square

The first written references to the Tapajós Indian settlement in the area date back to 1542, when Francisco Orellana sacked one of their corn plantations.

In 1621, ten years after the founding of Belém at the mouth of the Amazon River, the Portuguese explorer Pedro Teixeira, along with Father Cristovão, 26 soldiers and many Indians, set off to explore the upper reaches of the Amazon. They eventually found a Tupuliçus Indian settlement near the mouth of the Tapajós River and made port there. The Indians had already had contact with Europeans, mainly Spanish explorers who had been to the settlement. The Portuguese and Tupuliçus started trading.

Pedro Teixeira resumed his exploration. The Jesuits took on the work of founding a village for missionary purposes on the site, where Father António Vieira was known to have visited in 1659. Santarém was founded by Father João Filipe Bettendorff on 22 June 1661 with the name "Aldeia do Tapajós" (Tapajós village). Father Bettendorff built the Chapel of Our Lady of Conception. The site where the first mass was celebrated in the city is now marked by a monument. The Jesuits founded other villages nearby, including the Village of Borsari, known today as the Village of Alter do Chão, Pará.

After development from the missionaries, Francisco da Mota Falcão started construction of a fortress by the river in 1693, which was finished by his son, Manoel Mota Siqueira in 1697. The building had a square shape and featured bastions on each corner. The Fortress of Tapajós was the nucleus of the village that developed as the city of Santarém.

In 1758, the village of Tapajós was given the status of Vila and the name of Santarém, after a Portuguese city with the same name, and later was elevated to the category of city on October 24, 1848, by provincial law nº 145.

Over the centuries, the government has made several attempts to renovate the fortress, the last being in 1867, when the government sent six cannons to arm it. The renovation was never finished and the cannons were left in the street. Today not much remains of the fortress, as materials were taken for other building projects.

In 1900 a high school was built on the site. Early in the first decade of the 21st century, "Praça Mirante do Tapajós", a tourist attraction, was built behind the school. Two of the cannon from the fortress have been installed at the city's airport, where they can be seen from the passenger terminal; two others are located in the Centenário Square, and two in the SUDAM Campus of the Federal University of Western Pará (UFOPA).

== Geography ==
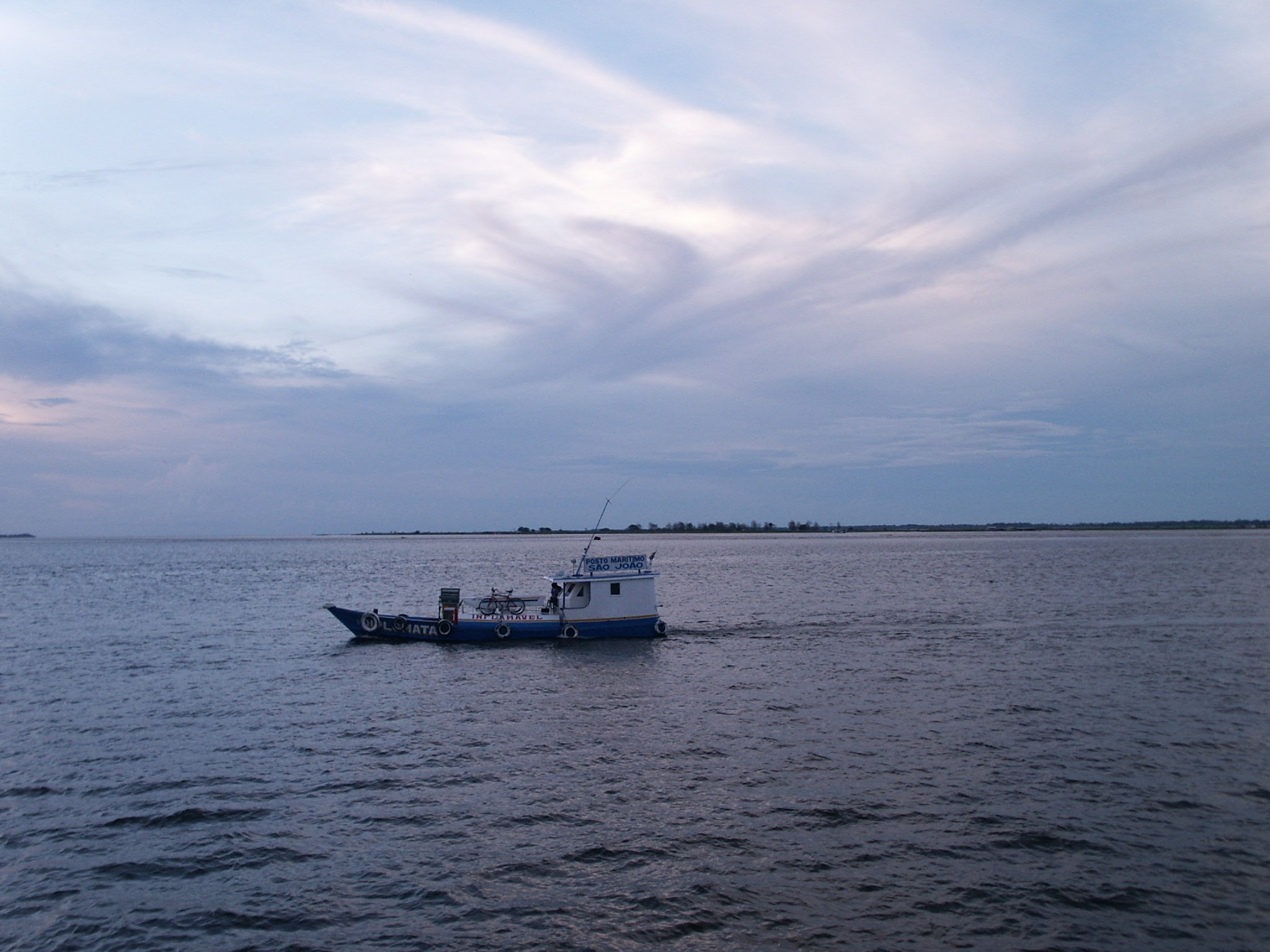
Tapajós River

Santarém is bordered by the Amazon and the Tapajós rivers. Both run along many kilometers in front of the city, side by side, without mixing. The Amazon's milky colored water carries sediment from the Andes in the west, while the Tapajós's water is somewhat warmer and has a deep-blue tone. This phenomenon is called "The meeting of the waters" by the locals.

=== Climate ===
Santarém has a tropical monsoon climate not subject to significant changes in temperatures due to its proximity to the equator. The average annual temperature varies between 25º and 28 °C or 82.4 °F, with a relative humidity of 86%. During the year the average rainfall is about 2,150 millimetres (85 in), which becomes more intense during the wet season that spans from November to July when the average monthly rainfall varies from 75 to 395 millimetres (3.0 to 15.6 in). The dry season spans from August through October; in this season the lowest rainfall is recorded which troughs at 31 millimetres or 1.2 inches.

Climate data for Santarém, Pará (1991-2020)
Month	Jan	Feb	Mar	Apr	May	Jun	Jul	Aug	Sep	Oct	Nov	Dec	Year
Record high °C (°F)	35.8 (96.4)	34.6 (94.3)	35.0 (95.0)	35.1 (95.2)	34.8 (94.6)	35.2 (95.4)	35.9 (96.6)	37.1 (98.8)	38.0 (100.4)	38.4 (101.1)	38.2 (100.8)	37.8 (100.0)	38.4 (101.1)
Mean daily maximum °C (°F)	31.2 (88.2)	30.7 (87.3)	30.6 (87.1)	30.8 (87.4)	31.0 (87.8)	31.2 (88.2)	31.2 (88.2)	31.9 (89.4)	32.9 (91.2)	33.3 (91.9)	33.3 (91.9)	32.7 (90.9)	31.5 (88.7)
Daily mean °C (°F)	27.7 (81.9)	27.3 (81.1)	27.4 (81.3)	27.5 (81.5)	27.7 (81.9)	27.6 (81.7)	27.6 (81.7)	28.2 (82.8)	29.1 (84.4)	29.5 (85.1)	29.3 (84.7)	29.0 (84.2)	28.2 (82.7)
Mean daily minimum °C (°F)	24.1 (75.4)	23.8 (74.8)	24.1 (75.4)	24.2 (75.6)	24.4 (75.9)	23.9 (75.0)	23.9 (75.0)	24.5 (76.1)	25.2 (77.4)	25.7 (78.3)	25.4 (77.7)	25.4 (77.7)	24.6 (76.3)
Record low °C (°F)	20.3 (68.5)	19.4 (66.9)	20.0 (68.0)	19.8 (67.6)	21.0 (69.8)	20.2 (68.4)	19.5 (67.1)	19.0 (66.2)	18.2 (64.8)	20.5 (68.9)	20.9 (69.6)	20.4 (68.7)	18.2 (64.8)
Average rainfall mm (inches)	196.5 (7.74)	291.1 (11.46)	412.3 (16.23)	374.8 (14.76)	269.4 (10.61)	142.1 (5.59)	105.8 (4.17)	56.4 (2.22)	44.5 (1.75)	48.2 (1.90)	69.3 (2.73)	144.1 (5.67)	2,154.5 (84.83)
Average rainy days	19	22	25	24	21	14	10	6	4	5	7	12	169
Source: World Climate Guide

== Demographics ==
Santarém Population by year
Year	Population
1980	191.950
1991	265.062
1996	242.755
1997	242.390
1998	242.081
1999	241.771
2000	262.538
2001	264.992
2002	266.391
2003	268.180
2004	272.237
2005	274.012
2006	276.074
2007	278.118
2008	272.704
2009	281.397
2010	294.580
2011	297.039
2012	299.419

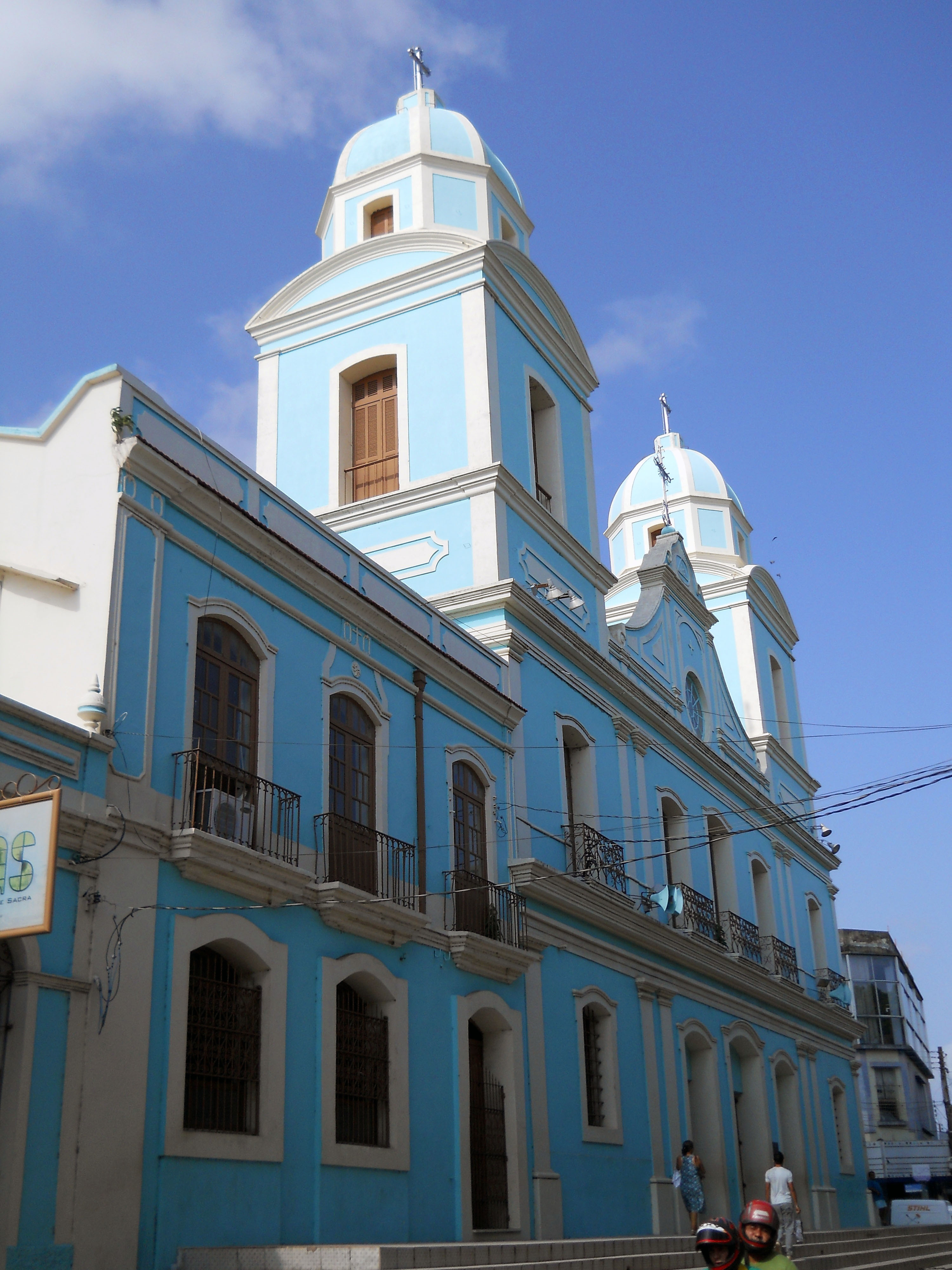
Santarém Metropolitan Cathedral, the Church of Our Lady of Conception

The total population of the city was 294,580 people (2010 census). Santarém is the seventh-largest city in the north region of Brazil, behind Manaus, Belém, Porto Velho, Ananindeua, Macapá and Rio Branco. Of the population 51.5% were men and 48.5% women.

Santarém lost population from 1996 to 1999, during the decline of the gold rush in the latter part of 1980s. Moreover, between 1980 and 2000, the rural population declined as people moved into cities due to poor infrastructure in the countryside.

Since the year 2000, Santarém's population has increased due to that migration, as well as people being attracted to its improved infrastructure, health care, schools, and other amenities. In 2008, the village of Mojui dos Campos was designated as an independent city, so its population was withdrawn from the Santarém total.

=== Religion ===
Santarém was founded by the Portuguese as a Catholic city and the vast majority of the population is Catholic. New migrants have brought differing religions, including various Protestant denominations, Judaism, Spiritualism, and Buddhism.

=== Economy ===
Santarém is an important regional market center in the Lower Amazon, located midway between the larger cities of Belém at the coast and Manaus upriver. The regional economy is based on agriculture, cattle, and mining. The city has seen many 'cycles' of development dominated by one or a few economic activities, including rubber extraction (in the last century), coffee production, and gold mining. Most recently, there has been a huge growth in the area of soybean plantations.

== Infrastructure ==
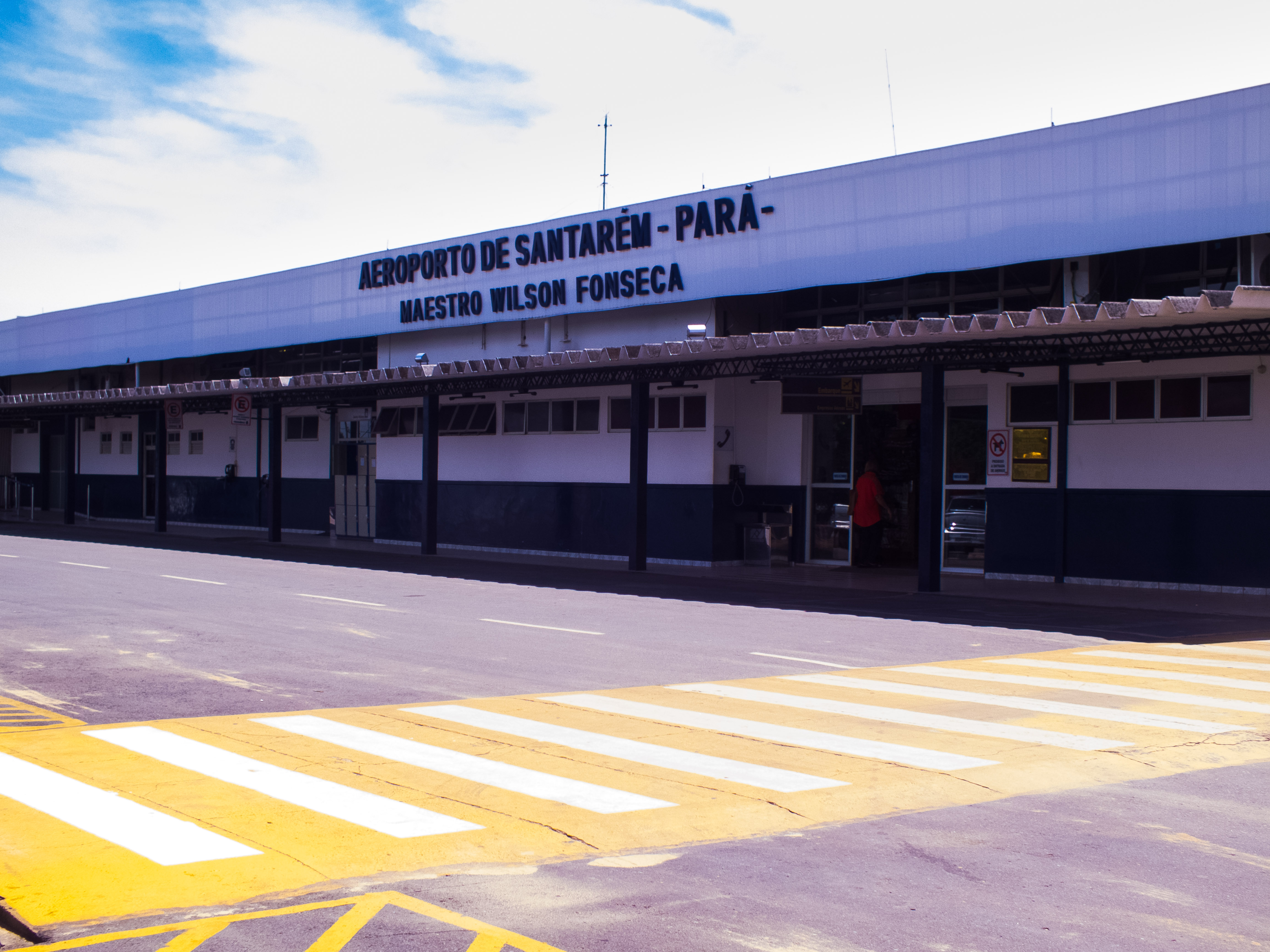
Santarém Airport

=== Airport ===
Santarém is home to Santarém-Maestro Wilson Fonseca Airport. As it is located between two of the most important airports in the region, it is an alternative for international flights. Situated 15 km from downtown, the airport can be reached by car or bus in about 20 minutes via Fernando Guilhon Highway. The airport was opened in 1977 by the Brazilian Air Force; in 1980 it was transferred to Infraero, a government agency responsible for operating the major Brazilian airports.

The airport handles traffic from six airlines connecting Santarém to the country and the world. As of September 2012, the airport was undergoing renovation and expansion of the Passenger Terminal Building and Parking lot to accommodate increased passenger traffic.

=== Highways ===
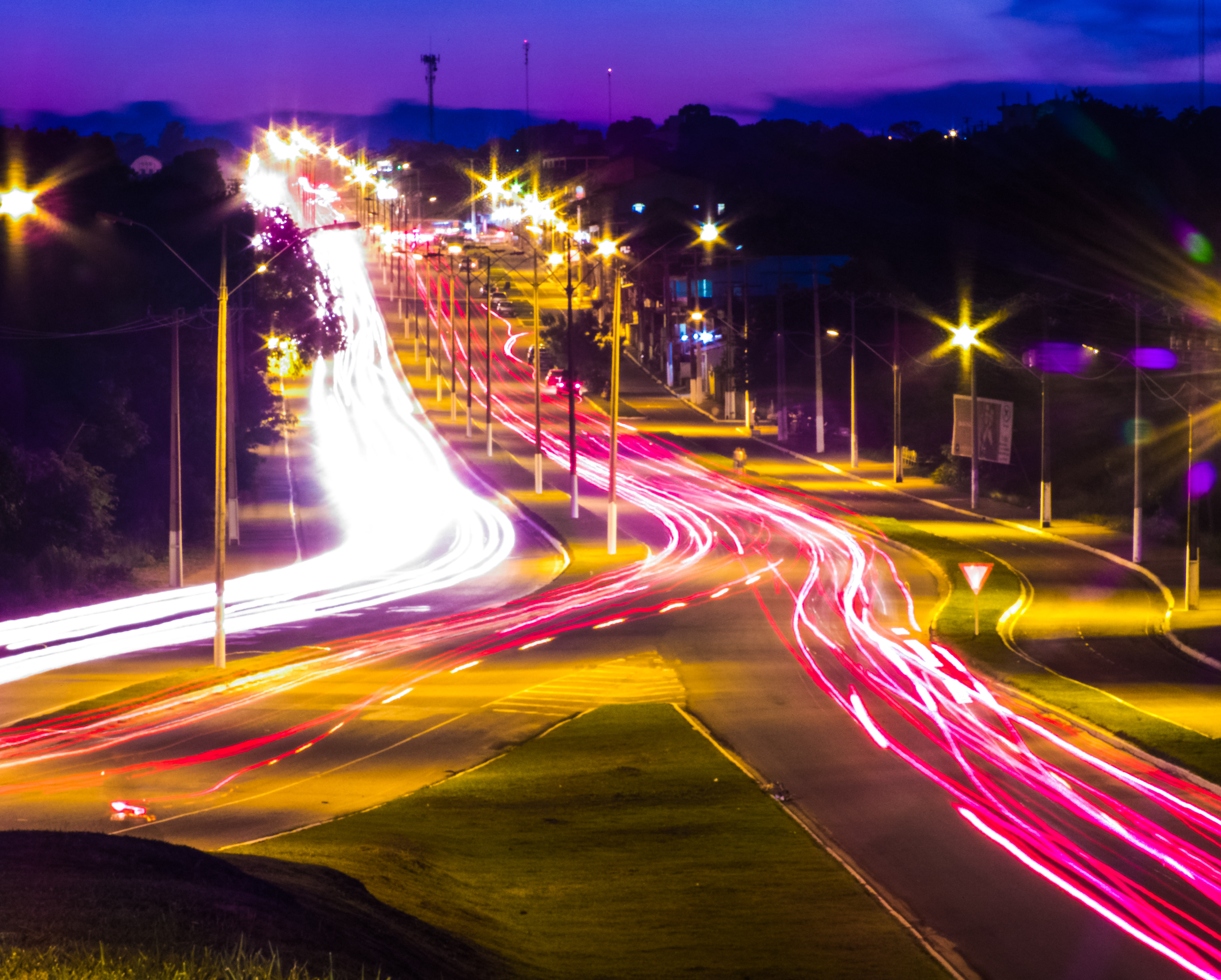
Fernando Guilhon Avenue during Rush Hour

BR-163 connects Santarém with southern Brazil. A large portion of it is not paved, which renders the highway nearly unusable during the wet season. BR-230 connects BR-163 to the state capital.

=== Fluvial ===
The rivers and waterways are still the central means of transporting passengers and cargo due to the poor conditions of the highways and the high price of airplane travel. Santarém is a popular destination for cruise ships on the Amazon, which make Port of Santarém regularly in the City Docks. The docks are administrated by the CDP (Companhia Docas do Pará) and are the second most important in the state, second only to Belém, due to its proximity to the Atlantic Ocean.

Most nearby villages have no roads and can only be reached by boat; trips can take up to 12 hours depending on the boat and the destination.

The Cargill Port is a private port near the Docks. It exports soybean and has capacity for storing 60,000 tons of soy. There is also a makeshift port near Tiradentes Square administered by the city, where small and medium-sized boats dock. As of 2012 a new Fluvial Terminal was under construction to replace the existing one.

=== Public Transportation ===
The Public Transportation System is made of: Urban bus service, Suburban bus service, Personal automobile transportation service (Taxi), Personal motorcycle transportation service (known as MotoTaxi), and School transportation service.

The public transportation services are administered by the Municipal Transportation Department, which plans and promotes traffic development. Traffic safety is administered by several governmental agencies such as the Transit Police branch of the State Police (PTRAN), the Brazilian Highway Police based in Santarém, the DMV, and the transportation department through its fiscal management and guards.

=== Education ===
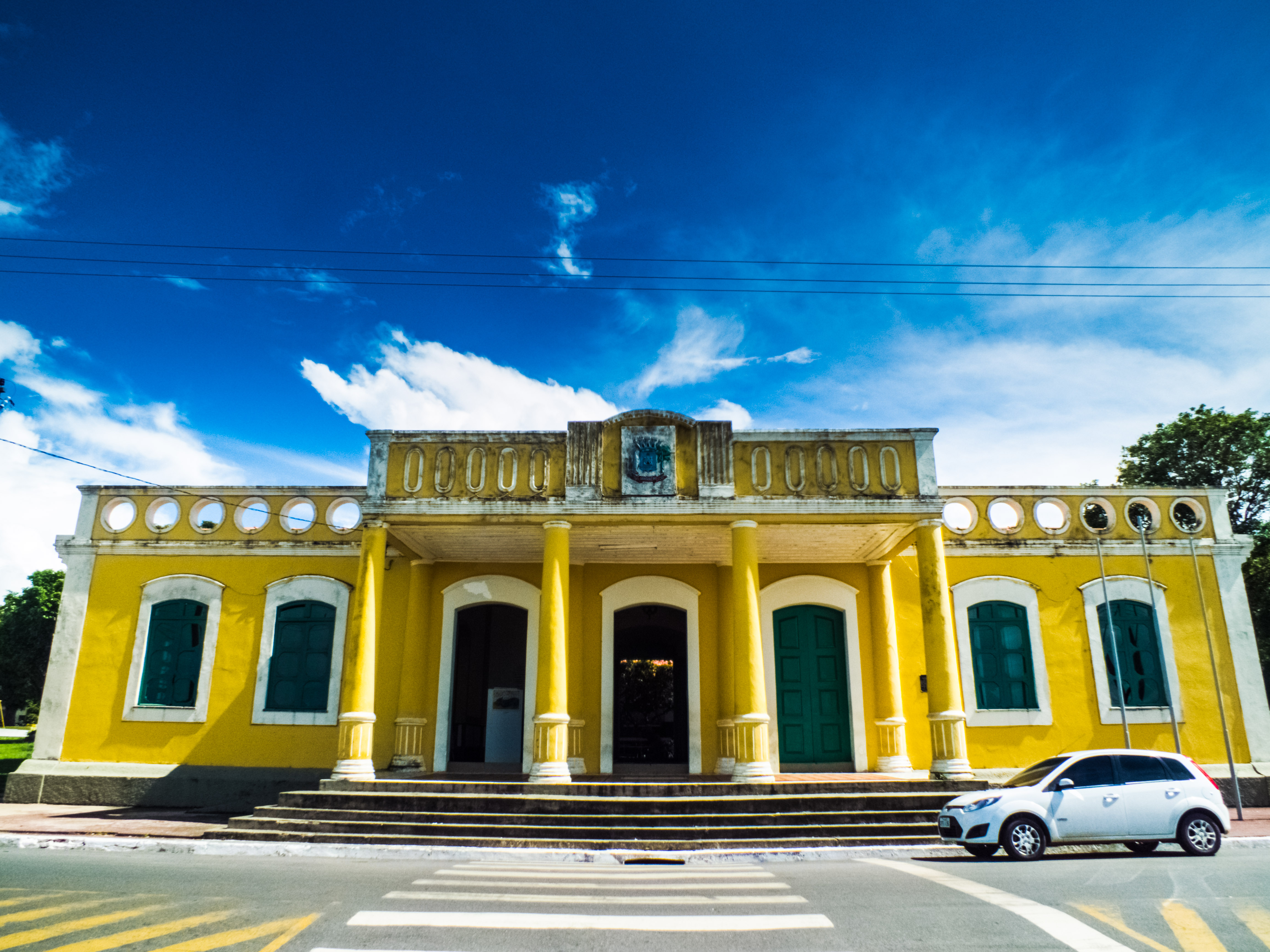
City museum

Santarém has 457 municipal schools accommodating 62,121 students, 44 state primary and high schools, 44 particular schools and twelve universities.

The city museum, Centro Cultural João Fona (João Fona Cultural Center), is available to visitors free of charge. It is located in an 1853 building used before in its history as a City Hall, Municipal Courthouse and jail.

One school, Escola Estadual do 1^{o} Grau Richard Henington, has 13 classrooms in three parts. It is named after a United States-born Brazilian, Richard Henington (born May 19, 1830), who originated in Crystal Springs, Mississippi and immigrated to Brazil in 1867, arriving on August 16, 1868, and settling in Santarém.

=== Health ===
The city administers the Municipal Hospital. As of September 2012, it maintains 35 rural health care posts, and 50 health care centers in the urban area, six of which operate 24 hours a day. SAMU is also based in the city; it rescues victims of all kinds of accidents, working many times together with the State Fire Department. In 2012 a hospital was built to treat people rescued by SAMU and the Fire Department. The State Regional Hospital is located in the city, receiving and treating patients from all the cities in the west of Pará.

=== Communications ===
Santarém has WiFi internet service providers. As of 2013, DSL is not yet available, and private internet connection is slow and expensive. The city maintains several WiFi hotspots in most squares, monuments, and tourist attractions. City residents support many newspapers, TV stations, and radio stations.

Radio amateurs maintain a VHF repeater operating on 146.950 MHz that can reach more than 100 km, covering the village of Alter do Chão and the cities of Belterra, Mojui dos Campos, Óbidos and Oriximiná.

== Controversy around Cargill soybean port ==
In 2003, the US-based corporation Cargill completed a port facility for processing soybean in Santarém. The port has dramatically stimulated soybean production in the area due to improving the transport of the commodity crop. Although the company complied with state legislation, it failed to comply with a federal law requiring an Environmental Impact Statement. Instead, Cargill contested in court its need to comply. In late 2003 Greenpeace launched a campaign claiming the new port has increased deforestation of local rain forest, damaging the regional habitat, as farmers have cleared land to make way for soy crops.

In February 2006, the federal courts in Brazil gave Cargill six months to complete the environmental assessment. This ruling came as part of a broader popular backlash against the port; while it was initially supported by locals who hoped for jobs, opinion has turned against it as the jobs have not appeared. In July 2006, federal prosecutor Felícia Pontes Jr. suggested that the government was close to shutting down the port.

Cargill responded to criticisms of the port by emphasizing its contribution to encouraging economic development in the local province, one of the poorest in Brazil. It says that "extreme measures," such as closing the port, are not necessary because "Soybean occupies less than 0.6 percent of the land in the Amazon biome today." Cargill also points to its partnership with The Nature Conservancy to encourage farmers around Santarém to comply with Brazilian law that requires 80% of forest cover to be left intact in Amazon forest areas while the land is being cultivated.

After Indigenous groups blockaded the port for 33 days, the Brazilian government revoked a decree which privatized sections of the Tapajós, Madeira and Tocantins rivers.

== Sister cities ==
Santarém, Portugal

== See also ==
- List of municipalities in Pará
- Fordlândia
- Nova República
