= Abaeté Futebol Clube =

Abaeté
- Full name: Abaeté Futebol Clube
- Founded: March 5, 1936 (89 years ago)
- Ground: Estádio Humberto Parente, Abaetetuba, Pará state, Brazil
- Capacity: 3,100
Home colours	Away colours

Abaeté Futebol Clube, commonly known as Abaeté, is a Brazilian football club based in Abaetetuba, Pará state. They competed in the Série C once.

== History ==
The club was founded on March 5, 1936. They won the Campeonato Paraense Second Level in 2004. Abaeté competed in the Série C in 2005, when they were eliminated in the Third Stage by fellow Pará state club Remo.

== Achievements ==
- Campeonato Paraense Second Level:
  - Winners (1): 2004

== Stadium ==
Abaeté Futebol Clube play their home games at Estádio Humberto Parente. The stadium has a maximum capacity of 3,100 people.
