= History of Acre =

Northern Brazilian state

The History of Acre refers to the history of the Brazilian northern state, and also reveals important aspects of Brazilian history, especially during the 19th and 20th centuries.

== Pre-Cabral period ==
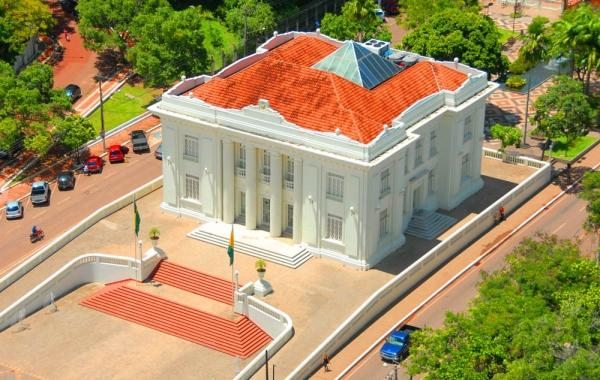
Palácio Rio Branco, the seat of government, named after the Baron of Rio Branco. It contains an obelisk in honor of the heroes of the Acre War.

In the region of the current state of Acre, numerous Geoglyphs (structures made in the ground) with ages varying up to 2,100 years have been found. Due to their complexity, they are reminiscent of pre-Columbian civilizations, demonstrating a high degree of knowledge in various areas and mastery of advanced earth and water-moving techniques. The latest excavations made an important discovery in Xapuri: A prop hole in good condition was located in a round-shaped geoglyph, reinforcing the thesis that the Indians of that time might have used palisaded fortifications for habitation and security.

== European colonization ==
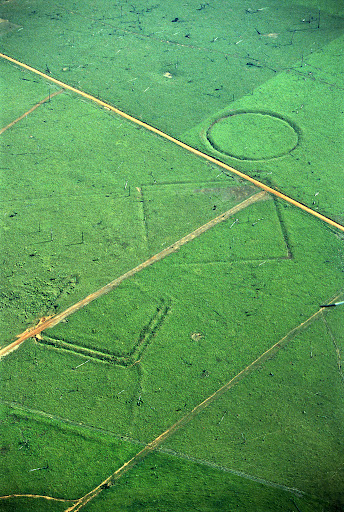
Geoglyphs on deforested land in the Amazon rainforest of Acre.

The northeastern droughts and the economic appeal of rubber, a product that, at the end of the 19th century, began its trajectory of high prices in international markets, were among the predominant causes in the movement of human masses in search of the El Dorado in Acre. The Portuguese excursions in the colonial period had already reached their peak in Brazil during the 18th century. The inevitable consequence was the westward expansion of the geographic horizon, reaching Spanish-held lands, which became the subject of the Treaty of Madrid (1750) and Santo Ildefonso (1777). Both treaties, based on the explorations made by Manuel Félix de Leme in the Guaporé and Madeira basins, established as the dividing line of the respective possessions, the riverbeds of the Mamoré and Guaporé up to their maximum western limit, on the left bank of the Javary.

The settlement of the area, stimulated by the creation of the new Captaincy of Mato Grosso (1751), took place in the direction of the frontier, with important centers emerging: Vila Bela (1752), on the banks of the Guaporé; Vila Maria (1778), on the Paraguay River; and Casalvasco (1783).

== Imperial period ==
Until the mid-nineteenth century, no systematic settlement of the area was thought of. At the time, the amount of natural rubber found there had attracted worldwide interest, provoking a spontaneous colonization.

The economic policy of the Empire of Brazil, oriented towards the coffee-based agrarian-exporting activity did not accommodate the exploitation and incorporation of the far western territories. From this neglect, it resulted that, in the Atlas of the Empire of Brazil (1868), by Cândido Mendes de Almeida, a reference at its time, did not contain the Acre River and its main tributaries, unbeknownst to geographers.

Despite this policy, some Brazilian sertanistas (Note: Sertanismo was an activity, that began during the 17th century in Brazil, in which men entered the Brazilian wilderness to capture Indians, explore for precious metals, and to learn about natural riches and species.) explored this wild and unpopulated region, not knowing if it belonged to Brazil, Peru, or Bolivia. At the time, João Rodrigues Cametá began the conquest of the Purus River; Manuel Urbano da Encarnação, a Mura Indian with great knowledge of the region, reached the Acre River, going up it to the vicinity of Xapuri; and João da Cunha Correia reached the upper Tarauacá basin. This clearing took place mostly on Bolivian land.

The exploratory activities, the industrial importance of the rubber reserves, and the penetration of Brazilian settlers in the region aroused the interest of Bolivia, which requested better boundary fixing. After several failed negotiations, in 1867, the Treaty of Ayacucho was signed, which recognized colonial uti possidetis. The boundary was established by the parallel of the confluence of the Beni-Mamoré rivers, towards the east, to the source of the Javary, although the headwaters of this river were not yet known.

=== Northeastern migration ===
As the price of rubber rose, the demand grew and the rush to the Amazon increased. (Note: Rubber was a raw material that caused a rush to the Brazilian Amazon, being as important as coffee to the economy.) The rubber plantations thus multiplied in the valleys of Acre, Purus, and, further west, Tarauacá. Within one year (1873–1874), in the Purus basin, the population rose from around a thousand to four thousand inhabitants. On the other hand, the imperial government, already sensitive to the offers arising from the demand for rubber, considered the entire Purus valley as Brazilian.

Also in the second half of the 19th century, the demographic and geo-economic balance of the empire was disturbed, as the coffee boom in the South channeled financial and labor resources to the detriment of the Northeast. The growing impoverishment of this region spurred waves of migration toward the states of Rio de Janeiro, Minas Gerais, and São Paulo. The movement of populations became particularly active during the prolonged drought in the Northeastern countryside from 1877 to 1880, expelling hundreds of Northeasterners, who headed to the rubber plantations in search of work.

The advance of the northeastern migration reached the banks of the Juruá and accelerated the occupation of the lands that Bolivia would later claim. The great riverbeds and the network of their tributaries were then intensely trafficked by flotillas of vessels of the most varied sizes, transporting settlers, goods, and supplies to the more distant nuclei. The governments of Amazonas and Pará soon instituted the so-called casas aviadoras, which financed various types of operations, guaranteed credits, and promoted commercial incentives in the rubber plantations.

A native plant, the rubber tree was hidden in the tangle of other trees, equally native, forcing the men who went out in search of rubber to build a labyrinth, with zigzagging trails in the jungle. From the rubber plantation emerged the human figure of the rubber tapper (seringueiro). The work relations followed a patriarchal system: The seringueiro-patrão ("rubber-patron") was the beneficiary of the credit from the casa aviadora, and the seringueiro-extrator ("rubber extractor") the one who received the credit from the patron. One lived in the barracão ("shack"), usually located by the river, the other, in the barraco (lower quality shack) in the middle of the jungle. From 1920 on, the neologism seringalista was used to refer to the patron.

Thus, before the end of the 19th century, the Brazilian occupation of the geographical space of Acre was completed, where more than fifty thousand people formed, in the forest recesses of the three hydrographic valleys, a society whose sole objective was to produce rubber. All this work, however, was taking place on the soil of Bolivia, a country which, by the difficulties of geography, had not been able to complete the social, economic, political, and geographical integration of the extensive valleys of Acre, the upper Purus, and the upper Juruá, into the national community.

Article 2 of the Treaty of Ayacucho, concluded by Brazil and Bolivia in 1867, mandated that the border line be a parallel line drawn from the mouth of the Beni River with the Mamoré (10º20') until it encountered the source of the Javary. It had an addendum: If the Javary had its sources north of this east–west line, the border would run, from the same latitude, along a straight line to seek the main source of the Javary.

In 1877, however, when the first Brazilians settled in Acre, no one knew where the boundary of the treaty was. On the other hand, the exact latitude of the source of the Javary River was unknown. These were technical and geographical problems difficult to solve quickly due to a lack of material resources. The direction of the "rubber rivers" was the natural trail of the Northeastern conquest (especially of the Ceará), in which groups from Pará and Amazonas also participated.

== 20th century ==
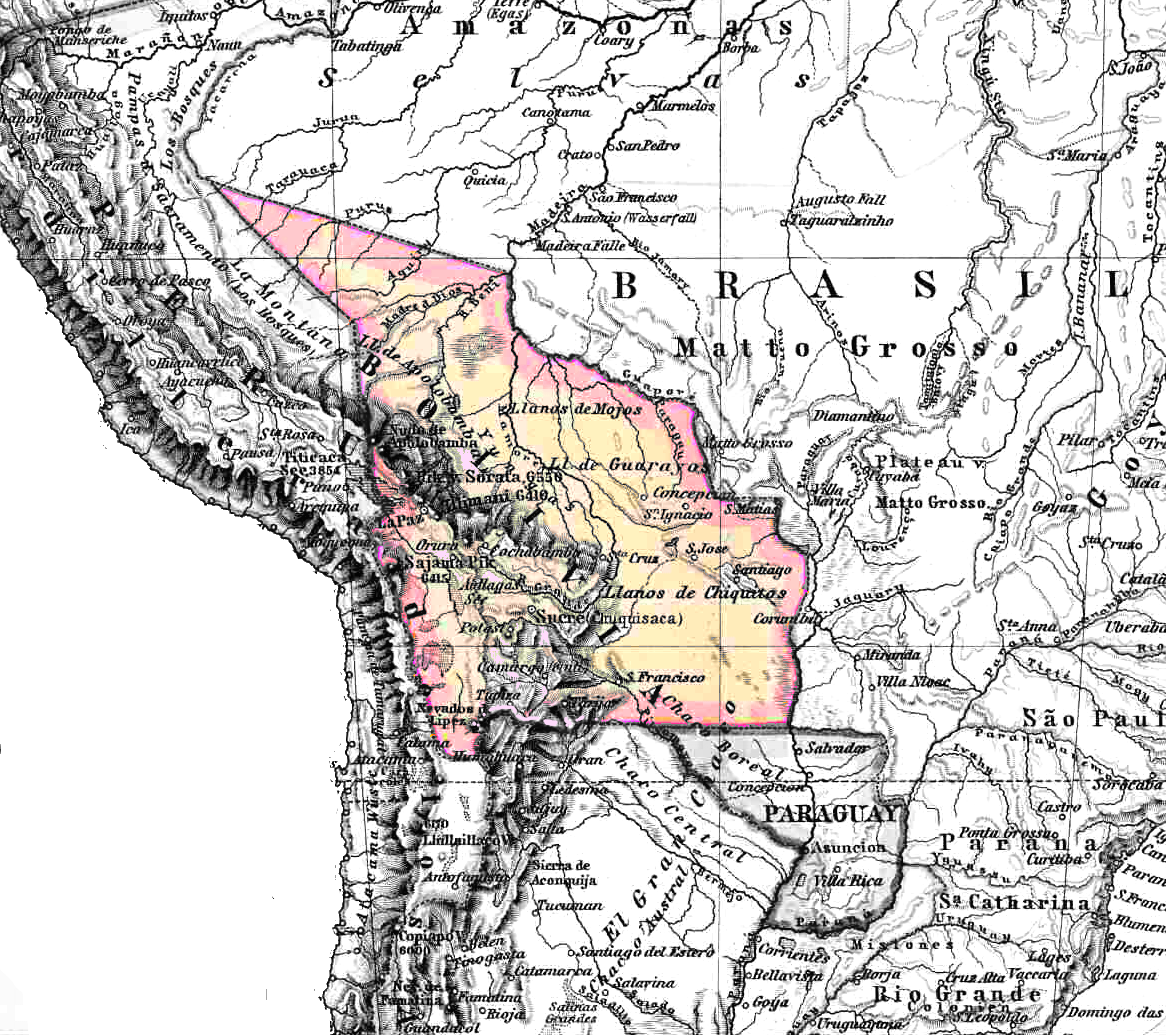
Map from the late 19th century, where Acre appears as part of Bolivia.

=== Acre War ===
In 1890, a Bolivian official, José Manuel Pando, alerted his government to the fact that in the Juruá watershed, there were more than 300 rubber plantations, with the occupation by Brazilians taking place rapidly on Bolivian soil. Brazilian penetration had advanced in-depth westward from the 64th meridian to beyond the 72nd meridian, over a length of more than a thousand kilometers, even though the borders above the confluence of the Beni-Mamoré were already fixed under the 1867 treaty.

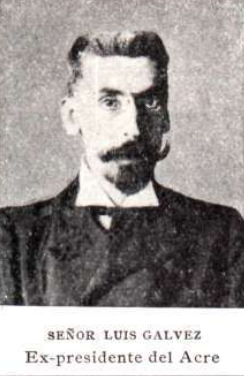
Gálvez, President of Acre

In 1895, a commission was created to adjust the boundary. The Brazilian representative, Gregório Taumaturgo de Azevedo, resigned after finding that ratification of the 1867 treaty would harm the rubber tappers established there.

In 1899, the Bolivians established an administrative post in Puerto Alonso, collecting taxes and levying customs duties on the activities of the Brazilians. The following year, Brazil accepted Bolivia's sovereignty in the area, when it officially recognized the old boundaries at the Beni-Mamoré confluence. The rubber tappers, unaware of the diplomatic proceedings, judged their interests to have been harmed and began rebellious movements, causing two major contestations.

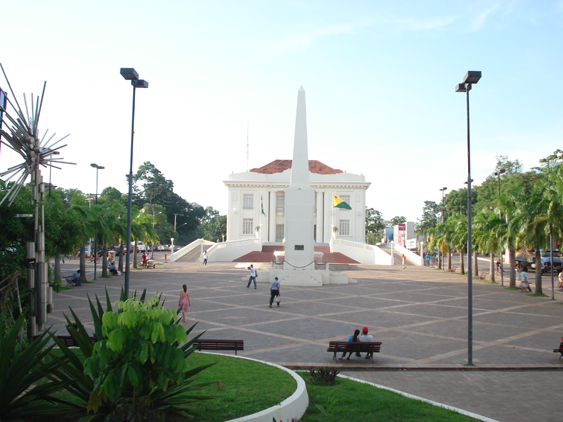
Rio Branco Palace, seat of government, and obelisk in honor of the heroes of the Acre War.

In April 1899, a lawyer from Ceará, José Carvalho, led an armed action, which culminated in the expulsion of the Bolivian authorities. Soon after, Bolivia began negotiations with an Anglo-American trust, the Bolivian Syndicate, to promote, with exceptional powers (tax collection, armed force), the political and economic incorporation of Acre into its territory. The governor of Amazonas, José Cardoso Ramalho Júnior, was informed of the adjustment by an official of the Bolivian consulate in Belém, the Spaniard Luis Gálvez Rodríguez de Arias, and trusted to him the contingents to occupy Puerto Alonso. Gálvez proclaimed the Republic of Acre there, becoming its president with the support of the rubber tappers. The new state was intended to remove Bolivian rule and later request annexation to Brazil, as Texas had done in North America. In March 1900, due to protests from Bolivia, President Campos Sales extinguished the short-lived republic (eight months after its creation). Luis Gálvez had to capitulate and withdrew to Europe.

The Bolivians resettled in the region but then suffered the attack of another expedition that had been formed in Manaus, with the help of the new governor Silvério Néri, who was also opposed, behind the scenes, to Bolivia's dominance over Acre, from where large sums for the state treasury came in the form of taxes. In December 1900, composed of intellectual young men from the bohemian Manaus, the "Expedition of the Poets" disbanded after a quick combat in front of Puerto Alonso.

=== Plácido de Castro's action and diplomatic intervention ===
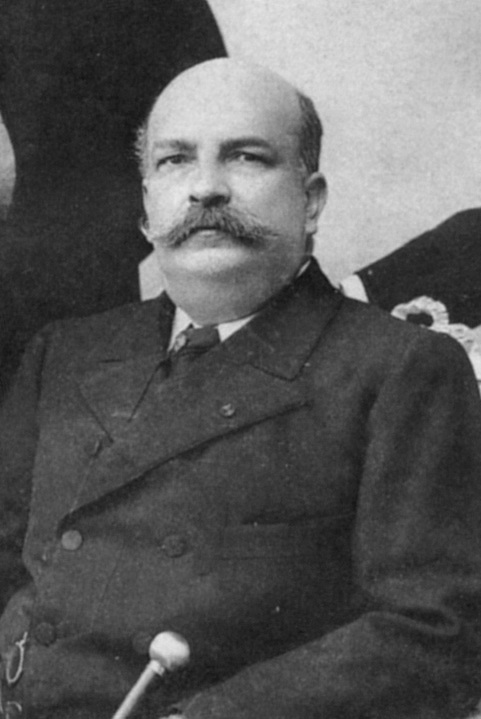
Minister Baron of Rio Branco.

Finally, traders and landowners in the Acre River decided to give the leadership of a new insurrection to a former student of the Military School of Porto Alegre, José Plácido de Castro, from São Gabriel, who, at the head of an improvised corps of rubber tappers, started operations in the village of Xapuri, in upper Acre, and arrested the Bolivian authorities (August 1902). After sparse and successful fighting, Plácido de Castro besieged Puerto Alonso, causing the surrender of the Bolivian forces (February 1903).

Plácido de Castro was influenced by the fact that Bolivia had leased the territory of Acre to a chartered company, similar to those operating in Asia and Africa: The Bolivian Syndicate, made up of English and American capital, was to take over the administration of Acre, with police forces and an armed fleet. Representatives of this company arrived at the village of Antimari (by the Acre River), below Puerto Alonso, but gave up the mission as the revolutionaries dominated the entire river, with little left for the end of Bolivian resistance.

Acclaimed governor of the independent state of Acre, Plácido de Castro organized a government in Puerto Alonso. From then on, the issue moved into the diplomatic sphere. The Baron of Rio Branco had assumed the Foreign Ministry and his first act was to dismiss the Bolivian Syndicate. The bankers responsible for the deal accepted Brazil's proposal in New York City: Ten thousand pounds as the price for giving up the contract (February 1903). Subsequently, Rio Branco adjusted with Bolivia a modus vivendi which provided for the military occupation of the territory, up to the 10º20' parallel, by detachments of the Brazilian Army, in the zone which was designated as Northern Acre. From the 10º20' parallel southward – Acre Meridional – the governance of Plácido de Castro, based in Xapuri, subsisted. In November 1903, Rio Branco and plenipotentiary Assis Brasil signed with Bolivian representatives the Treaty of Petrópolis, by which Brazil acquired Acre by purchase (two million pounds sterling) and ceded a small strip of the then territory of Mato Grosso called the Triângulo do Abunã, with approximately 2,300 km^{2}. As a result, the Independent State was dissolved, and the southern and northern Acre became the Brazilian territory of Acre, organized, according to the terms of law n° 1.181, of 25 February 1904, and decree 5.188, of 7 April 1904, into three administrative departments: The Upper Acre, the Upper Purus, and the Upper Juruá, headed by mayors of the free choice and appointment of the president of the republic.

Once the Bolivian part was solved, another case had to be settled with Peru. The country, alleging the validity of colonial titles, claimed the whole territory of Acre and a large area of the state of Amazonas, and administrative and military delegations from this country tried to establish themselves in Alto Purús (1900, 1901 and 1903) and Alto Juruá (1898 and 1902). The Brazilians, with their resources, forced the Peruvians to abandon the Alto Purús (September 1903). Rio Branco, to avoid new conflicts, suggested a modus vivendi for the neutralization of areas in the Alto Purús and Alto Juruá and the establishment of a joint administration (July 1904). This did not prevent an armed conflict between Peruvians and a Brazilian army detachment serving in the newly created Alto Juruá department. The fighting ended with the withdrawal of the Peruvian forces. In light of the Brazilian titles and the studies of the mixed commissions that surveyed the Alto Purús and Alto Juruá zones, Rio Branco proposed to the government of Peru the boundary agreement signed on 8 September 1909. With this act, the political-legal integration of the territory into the Brazilian community was completed.

=== Autonomist Movement ===
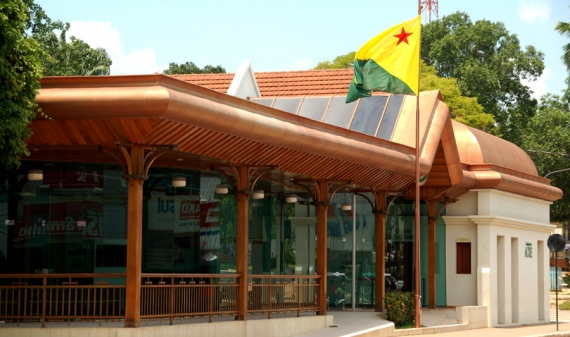
Memorial dos Autonomistas ("Autonomists Memorial"), located in the capital Rio Branco

Between 1904 and 1920, Acre did not have a single capital, with the capitals of the three departments reporting directly to the federal government. The evolution of Acre appears as a typical phenomenon of modern penetration in Brazilian history, accompanied by important contributions to the economic projection of the country. Exerting a prominent role in national exports until 1913, when rubber began to be exported to the European and North American markets, Acre experienced a period of great prosperity: At the turn of the century, in less than a decade it had more than 50,000 inhabitants. Soon after the annexation of Acre to Brazil, the population hoped for its elevation to a state as soon as possible. But this did not happen. Attending to the legal dispositions of the Petrópolis Treaty, President Rodrigues Alves sanctioned the law which created the Territory of Acre (1904) – the first in the country – dividing the territory into three departments.

This subjugation caused intense revolts within the population. This was the case of the revolt of Cruzeiro do Sul in 1910, which deposed the departmental prefect of Alto Juruá and proclaimed the creation of the Acre State (the so-called Alto Juruá Revolt). One hundred days later, however, federal troops attacked the insurgents and restored "order" and guardianship. In 1913, a revolt occurred on the Purus, in Sena Madureira, for reasons very similar to the Alto Juruá. In 1918, it would be the turn of the autonomist struggle to reach the Acre valley, in Rio Branco, which protested intensely against the maintenance of that situation of subjugation to the federal government. But both revolts were equally forcibly suffocated by the Brazilian government.

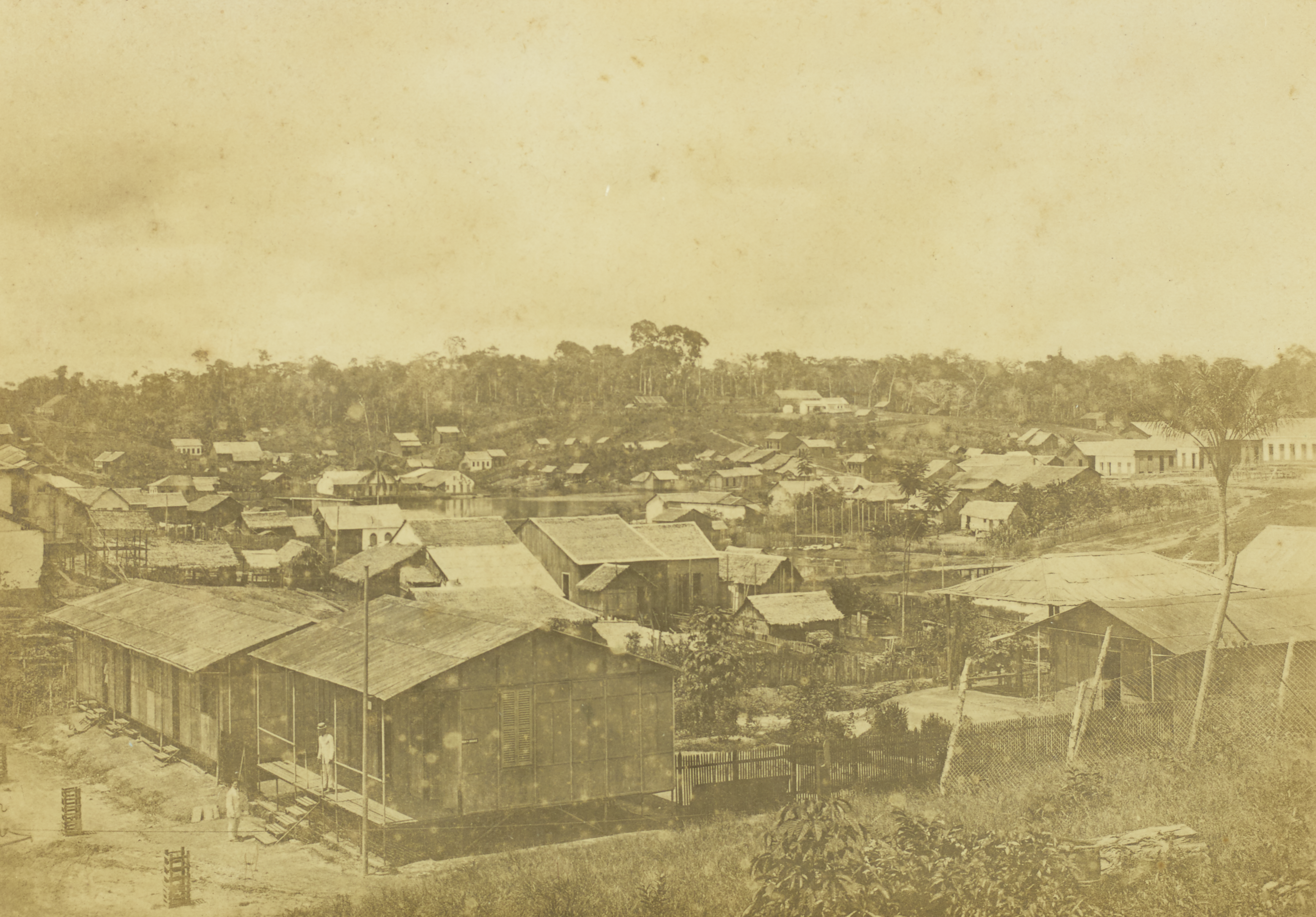
Cruzeiro do Sul in 1906.

After the failure of the revolts, the fight for autonomy no longer resorted to arms. The political reform of 1920 – which unified the four departmental prefectures into a single territorial government – pacified the Acre Valley, which benefited from the reform, since Rio Branco was chosen as the territory's capital. With the decline of the Rubber Cycle (1920), the autonomist movement lost strength, resurfacing only a decade later, when the Revolution of 1930 changed the course of the Brazilian Republic.

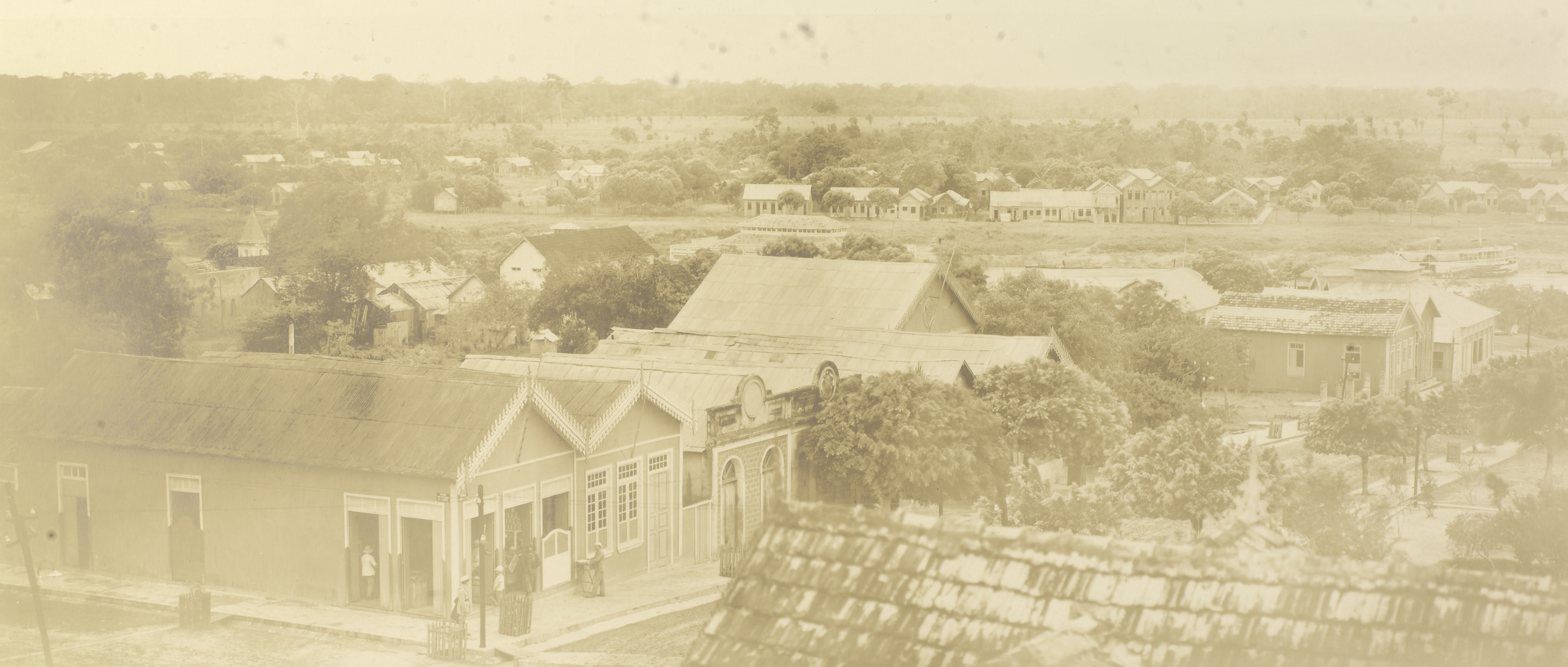
Rio Branco in 1930.

During World War II (1939–1945), the Malayan rubber plantations were occupied by the Japanese, and Thailand (a major rubber producer) participated in the war on the Axis side. Thus, Acre represented one of the main sources of rubber for the Allies during the war. In recognition of the productive contribution to the Allied victory, Brazil obtained North American resources to build the Companhia Siderúrgica Nacional, leveraging the industrialization of the Center-South region. To solve the impasse, and also to supply rubber for the Allied Forces', in May 1941 the Brazilian government made agreements with the United States government, the Washington Accords, starting another large-scale latex extraction operation in the Amazon, the "Battle of the Rubber".

The autonomist movement would only gain momentum again in the mid-1950s, when the Social Democratic Party (PSD), under former governor José Guiomard, decided to take up the banner and elaborated a bill that transformed Acre into a State. This bill caused great political movement throughout Acre and reached the National Congress in 1957, provoking an intense political dispute between the Brazilian Labour Party (PTB) of Oscar Passos and the PSD of Guiomard Santos, with the former opposing the bill to transform Acre into a state.

After many disputes in the National Congress, finally in 1962, during the parliamentary phase of João Goulart's government, Law 4070, authored by the then deputy Guiomard Santos, was signed. Still, the bill was approved and came into effect on 15 June 1962.

The PTB, however, was not defeated. In the first free and direct elections held in Acre's history, the PTB was the big winner, making the first constitutional governor of Acre, Professor José Augusto de Araújo, as well as all the Acre municipal governments. In the 1960s, the second cycle of efforts to accelerate the progress of the Amazonian area began with the creation of the Superintendence for the Development of the Amazon (SUDAM, 1966). The Trans-Amazonian Highway enabled the connection between many municipalities in the state. It was part of the planning policy designed to correct the demographic, economic, and political distortions of national integration.

== 21st century ==
In 2005, construction began on the Pacific Highway, that gives Brazil access through Acre to three Peruvian ports on the Pacific Ocean (Ilo, Maratani, and San Juán) to facilitate exports to Asia. The highway was completed in 2011.

In 2007, the state's legislative assembly approved a land regularization to legitimize the ownership and alienation of public rural properties, which benefitted 600 families in about ten Acre municipalities, an unprecedented achievement in the country. In June 2008, the law that changed Brazilian time zones came into effect, and Acre became one hour behind Brasília's time zone, instead two. However, after a referendum, Acre returned to the old time zone.

Beginning in 2008, Brazil reinforced army personnel on the border of Acre with the Bolivian Department of Pando. This border region had become unstable with the massacre of thirty Bolivian citizens by opponents of the referendum to approve a new constitution, but the conflicts dissipated with the holding of the referendum in Bolivia in January 2009.

In April 2008, Acre won a court case with the state of Amazonas over the dispute over the Cunha Gomes line in a 26-year territorial dispute, annexing the municipalities of Envira, Guajará, Boca do Acre, Pauini, Eirunepé, and Ipixuna. The territorial redefinition consolidated the inclusion of 1.2 million hectares of the Liberdade, Gregório, and Mogno forest complexes to the territory of Acre, corresponding to 11,583.87 square kilometers.

As of 2019, Gladson de Lima Cameli (PP) is the governor of the state, having been re-elected.

== See also ==
- Amazon rubber cycle
