= Treaty of Ayacucho =

1867 treaty between Brazil and Bolivia

Treaty of Friendship, Limits, Navigation, Commerce and Extradition
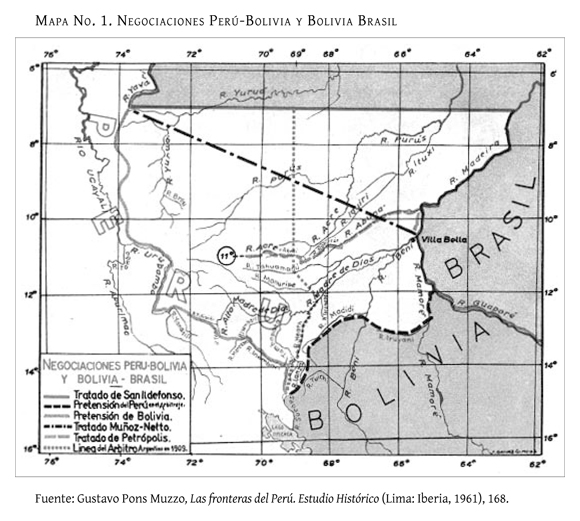
- Type: Bilateral treaty
- Signed: 27 March 1867
- Location: La Paz, Bolivia
- Signatories: Bolivia; Empire of Brazil
- Languages: Spanish and Portuguese

Full text
- es:Tratado de Ayacucho at Wikisource

The Treaty of Ayacucho was an agreement between the Empire of Brazil and Bolivia signed in 1867. It assigned the land of Acre (now a state in Brazil) to Bolivia in exchange for 102,400 square kilometers of territory further north then annexed to the Brazilian state of Amazonas. It lasted until 1899, when an expedition led by Luis Gálvez Rodríguez de Arias established the Republic of Acre.

== Background ==
Brazil was pressured to sign the agreement due to a threat of Bolivia joining in the war between Paraguay and Brazil. Demarcation of the borders was not started until the end of the 19th century.

== Collapse ==
In Acre profits in rubber drew thousands of Brazilians, largely immigrants from the poor northern coast of the country (deep semi arid of center-southern Ceará state). In 1889, the situation escalated when the Brazilians living in Acre decided to defy the authority of Bolivia. They wanted to create an independent territory and request annexation from Brazil. Bolivia's responded by founding the city of Puerto Alonso (today Porto Acre). In October 1889, Brazilians occupied and expelled the Bolivians from the region with military force.

In July 1899, with the help of the governor of the state of Amazonas, the Brazilian population proclaimed the Republic of Acre.

Bolivia then leased the region through the Treaty of Aramayo to The Bolivian Syndicate of New York in 1901. However, by August 1902, an insurrection of around two thousand Brazilian guerrillas began. They would finally defeat the Bolivian force in the Acre War in 1903. José Plácido de Castro was proclaimed governor of the Independent Acre.

== Supersession ==
Finally, it was superseded in 1903 by the Treaty of Petrópolis, which gave Acre to Brazil, in exchange for some concessions in the state of Mato Grosso.
