= José Plácido de Castro =

19/20th-century Brazilian soldier and politician

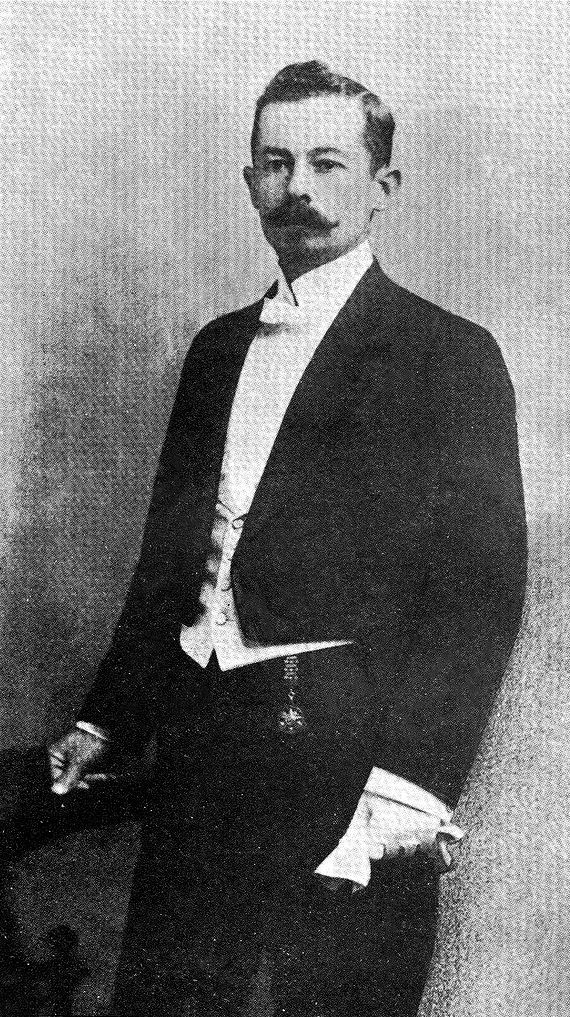
- Portrait of Plácido de Castro

President of Acre
- In office 7 August 1903 – 25 February 1904
- Preceded by: Joaquim Vitor da Silva

Personal details
- Born: 9 September 1873 São Gabriel, Rio Grande do Sul, Empire of Brazil
- Died: 11 August 1908 (aged 34) Seringal Benfica, Acre, Brazil
- Occupation: Soldier, politician

Military service
- Allegiance: Brazil; Republic of Acre
- Battles/wars: Federalist Revolution; Acre War

José Plácido de Castro (9 September 1873 – 11 August 1908) was a Brazilian soldier, surveyor, rubber producer and politician who led the armed revolt during the Acre War of 1902–3, when the Republic of Acre broke away from Bolivia. He was the president of the state of Acre just before and after it was purchased by Brazil. After the war he became extremely wealthy as a rubber producer, and made many enemies. He was assassinated in 1908. He is considered a hero of Brazil.

== Early years ==
José Plácido de Castro was born on 9 September 1873 in São Gabriel, Rio Grande do Sul. His great grandfather had served in the Brazilian theater of the 1801 war between Spain and Portugal, in which the Missões territory was annexed to Rio Grande do Sul, and his grandfather had fought in the 1820s Cisplatine War between the United Provinces of the Río de la Plata and the Empire of Brazil. His father, captain Prudente da Fonseca Castro, fought in Uruguay and in the Paraguayan War. His mother was Zeferina de Oliveira Castro.

His father died when he was twelve years old, and Plácido de Castro had to work to help support his mother and six brothers. He took various jobs before joining the 1st Regiment of Field Artillery in 1889 at the age of 16. A few months later he enrolled in the Rio Pardo School of Tactics. In 1892 he returned to his regiment as a staff sergeant. The next year he entered the Porto Alegre Military Academy. José Plácido was studying there at the start of the Federalist Revolution in 1893. He considered that the government of Marshal Floriano Peixoto was illegitimate, and direct elections should have been held to choose a new president. He joined the rebels and reached the rank of major. After the revolt was defeated in 1895 he refused the government amnesty and left the army. He stayed for a short time in São Gabriel, then moved to Rio de Janeiro, at that time the capital of Brazil.

Plácido de Castro arrived in Rio de Janeiro in 1896. He was given a position at the Military College of Rio de Janeiro as an inspector of students. He lost this job due to a quarrel with a teacher, and by March 1898 was working with the Companhia Docas de Santos, which ran the docks in the port of Santos. Early in 1899 he accepted an offer from the engineer Orlando Correia Lopes to go to Acre to work on delimiting rubber concessions. At that time Acre belonged to Bolivia, but was mainly occupied by Brazilian rubber tappers. He began to work as a land surveyor, and soon fell ill with malaria.

In July 1899 the Brazilians in Acre declared the Independent Republic of Acre. This was quickly dissolved by troops sent by the Brazilian government. Bolivia sent a small military mission to occupy Acre that was stopped by the rubber tappers. Silvério José Néri, governor of Amazonas, dispatched an expedition to Acre, known as the "Poets Expedition" due to the intellectuals among its members, which declared a second Independent Republic of Acre in November 1900. This time the republic was overthrown by Bolivian troops.

The newspapers now reported an alleged agreement where Bolivia would lease Acre to an Anglo-American "Bolivian syndicate" for 30 years, and would send troops armed by the United States to defend the territory. The possibility of losing control of the rubber trade alarmed the merchants of Pará, who until then had not backed the Amazonas merchants in trying to displace Bolivia from Acre. Bolivian president José Manuel Pando obtained approval from Congress for the syndicate plan on 21 December 1901. The news that a US concern backed by troops was taking over caused panic among the Brazilian rubber tappers in Acre.

== Acre revolution ==
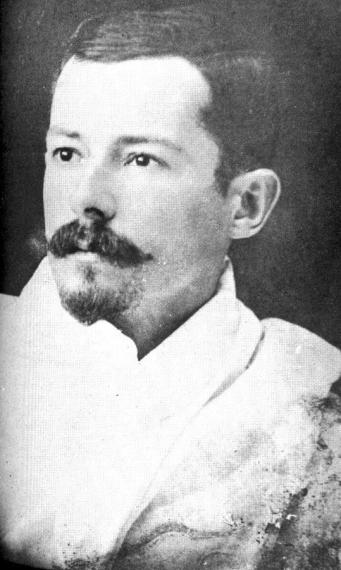
1903 portrait of Plácido de Castro

Plácido de Castro was working in the Purus River area when he heard of the Bolivian government's leasing plan. At the start of 1902 he accepted an invitation from Rodrigo de Carvalho and two other large rubber producers to lead a revolt against Bolivia. Plácido de Castro took a boat up the Acre river, ostensibly to conduct land surveys in the south but in fact carrying arms and ammunition. He stopped off briefly in Puerto Alonso (also called Puerto Acre, now Porto Acre) to meet the Bolivian governor Lino Romero and evaluate his future opponent. In the south he organised the rubber tappers and other inhabitants for the revolt. He then returned to Brazil, bypassing Puerto Alonso to avoid alerting the Bolivians. Plácido participated in the 1 July 1902 meeting at which the revolutionary junta was formed with a goal of obtaining the independence of Acre and then integrating it with Brazil.

Although he argued for immediately attacking the garrison of 230 troops at Puerto Alonso, Plácido de Castro was persuaded to first take the outpost at Xapuri. He entered Xapuri with 33 men in the early morning of 6 August 1902 and captured the sleeping garrison without spilling blood. On 7 August 1902 he issued a manifesto proclaiming that Acre was independent. He planned to next take Puerto Acre, but news of an approaching column of Bolivian troops from the Orthon River caused many of his 200 men to desert. When the remaining 63 rebels were attacked at Volta da Empresa (now Rio Branco) on 18 September 1902 they were decisively defeated, losing half their number. The Bolivian commander, Colonel Rojas, issued a proclamation in which he called the rebels and their leaders cowards. As a result, Plácido's ranks quickly swelled to at least 500 angry rubber tappers.

Rojas had lost men and was short of supplies. He made camp at Volta da Empresa and sent messengers to Puerto Alonso and Riberalta asking for fresh guns and ammunition Plácido de Castro surrounded the Bolivian camp but failed to achieve surprise in an attack on 5 October 1902 and instead settled into a siege, digging diagonal trenches to close in on the Bolivians. He invited Rojas to surrender on 9 October. Rojas held out for a few more days, then surrendered on 15 October and led his disarmed men back to Bolivia. On 14 October 1902 the rebels captured some of the outer defences of Puerto Alonso and the armed Bolivian launch Rio Afua, which they renamed the Independencia. Further successful fighting continued in the south against a column of Bolivian rubber tappers and a picket of poorly trained troops at Santa Rosa del Abuná.

Plácido de Castro could not persuade his men to continue south to destroy the Bolivian base on the Orthon, and turned back towards Puerto Alonso. Lino Romero had failed to organise for defence. Plácido de Castro surrounded the town on 8 January 1903, and launched an attack on 15 January 1903 that soon petered out. By now Plácido had 2,000 men under his command. They started to dig zigzag trenches to the Bolivian lines. Eventually, with his forces exhausted and almost out of ammunition, Romero surrendered on 24 January 1903. Plácido de Castro's leadership skills had played a key role in the success of the revolt, helped by supplies of food, ammunition and weapons from the great rubber barons of Acre.

== Later years ==
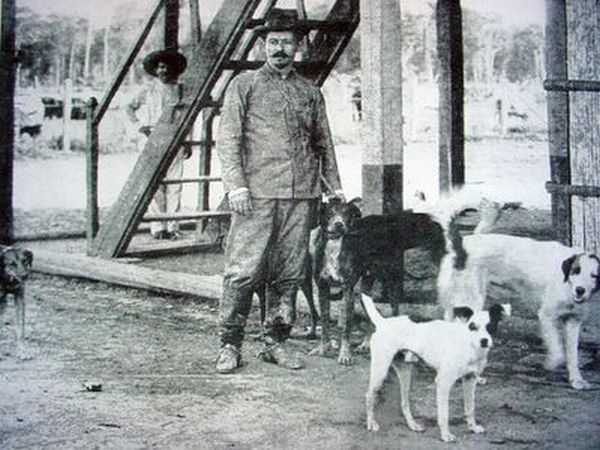
Plácido de Castro in 1907

The Brazilian government sent troops under General Olímpio da Silveira to take control. Plácido de Castro went to Rio de Janeiro to report on the campaign to José Paranhos, Baron of Rio Branco. On his journey he was acclaimed in Manaus and Belém, and received with honour in Rio. He declined an offer to become a colonel in the National Guard. In August 1903 Plácido was made provisional commander of the army of Acre and president of the territory of Acre. Plácido de Castro's views were those of a caudillo rather than a democrat. He was not impressed by Brazil's lack of support for the revolt, and favoured an independent state of Acre. However, under the Treaty of Petrópolis of 17 November 1903 Brazil formally acquired Acre for two million pounds sterling, ceded some land in Mato Grosso and undertook to build the Madeira-Mamoré Railroad to allow export of Bolivian products via the Amazon River. Plácido remained leader of Acre until February 1904.

After leaving office Plácido de Castro bought the Capatará rubber concession on credit, and also obtained property in Bolivia. He became a major landowner, culminating with the purchase on credit of the great Bagaço rubber concession. His rapidly acquired fortune earned him enemies. In June 1906 he was appointed mayor of Alto Acre, one of the four departments of the territory of Acre. He had to deal with various intrigues, including opposition by a former subordinate, Colonel Alexandrino José da Silva. He resigned from his post due to a disagreement with the government.

On 9 August 1908, as he was preparing to return to Rio Grande do Sul, he fell into an ambush prepared by José da Silva. He was shot from behind, and died two days later. His dying words were recorded as, "Death is a phenomenon as natural as life. He who knows how to live will know how to die. I only lament that having had so much occasion for glorious death, these 'heroes' have shot me in the back". His body was taken to Porto Alegre and buried in the Santa Casa cemetery.

== Legacy ==
Plácido de Castro has become admired as a hero of Brazil. The municipality of Plácido de Castro, Acre, was created in 1963. Rio Branco has a Plácido de Castro square. José Plácido de Castro was included in the Tancredo Neves Pantheon of the Fatherland and Freedom in Brasília on 17 November 2004 as the liberator of Acre. The Rio Branco International Airport was renamed the Rio Branco-Plácido de Castro International Airport in 2009.

== Bibliography ==
- Carlos Fernandes, "José Plácido de Castro", So Biografias (in Portuguese)
- Eduardo Carneiro, "A Formação do Acre", Historianet (in Portuguese)
- Hecht, Susanna B.; Cockburn, Alexander (2011-01-15), The Fate of the Forest: Developers, Destroyers, and Defenders of the Amazon, Updated Edition, University of Chicago Press, ISBN 978-0-226-32273-5
- Herói Brasileiro: Plácido de Castro (in Portuguese), Folha de S. Paulo: Enciclopédia Mirador Internacional
- Lei n˚11.917, de 9 de abril de 2009 (in Portuguese), Lei Direto, 13 April 2009
- Marshall, Oliver; Jenkins, Dilwyn; Cleary, David (2009-11-16), The Rough Guide to Brazil, Rough Guides, ISBN 978-1-4053-8020-1
- Pedraja, René De La (2006-04-11), Wars of Latin America, 1899–1941, McFarland, ISBN 978-0-7864-8257-3
- Scheina, Robert L. (2003-07-31), Latin America's Wars Volume II: The Age of the Professional Soldier, 1900–2001, Potomac Books, Inc., ISBN 978-1-59797-478-3
- Senador Jorge Viana, Plácido de Castro (in Portuguese)
- Sergio Lamarão; Inoã Carvalho Urbinati, CASTRO, Plácido de (PDF) (in Portuguese), Centro de Pesquisa e Documentação de História Contemporânea do Brasil
