= Republic of Acre =

1899-1903 separatist republic in South America

Coordinates: 9°58′S 67°48′W

Republic of Acre República do Acre República del Acre
- 1899 – 1900; 1900 – 1900; 1903 – 1903
- Top: 1899-1900; bottom: 1903; Flag Coat of Arms (1903)
- Motto: "Patria e Liberdade"
- Seal

- Location of Acre in present-day Brazil
- Status: Unrecognized state
- Capital: Cidade do Acre
- Common languages: Portuguese
- Other languages: Spanish (for native Peruvians and Bolivians)
- Religion: Roman Catholicism
- Government: Presidential republic
- President
  - 1899–1900: Gálvez Rodríguez
  - 1903: Plácido de Castro
- History
  - First Republic declared: 14 July 1899
  - Restored to Bolivia: 15 March 1900
  - Second Republic declared: November 1900
  - Second Republic suppressed: 24 December 1900
  - Third Republic declared: 27 January 1903
  - Treaty of Petrópolis: 11 November 1903
- Currency: Réis
Preceded by	Succeeded by
Bolivia	Peru; Brazil
- Today part of: Brazil

The Republic of Acre (Portuguese: República do Acre, Spanish: República del Acre) or the Independent State of Acre (Portuguese: Estado Independente do Acre, Spanish: Estado Independiente del Acre) was a secessionist republic that emerged in then Bolivia's Acre region between 1899 and 1903. The region was eventually annexed by Brazil in 1903 following the Acre War and is now the State of Acre.

== History ==
For forty years, after around 1860, Acre had been settled by Brazilians, who made up the vast majority of the population. The territory of Acre was assigned to Bolivia in 1867 by the Treaty of Ayacucho with Brazil. The rubber boom of the late 19th century attracted many Brazilian migrants to the region. In 1899–1900, the Spanish journalist and former diplomat Luis Gálvez Rodríguez de Arias led an expedition that sought to seize control of what is now Acre from Bolivia. The expedition was secretly financed by the Amazonas state government and aimed to incorporate Acre into Brazil after its independence from Bolivia. Gálvez declared himself president of the First Republic of Acre on 14 July 1899, and set up his capital at Puerto Alonso, which he renamed Cidade do Acre. The first republic lasted until March 1900, when the Brazilian government sent troops to arrest Gálvez and restore Acre to Bolivia. Gálvez was deported to Spain and the inhabitants of Acre found themselves up against both Bolivia and Brazil.

In November 1900 an attempt was made at creating a Second Republic of Acre with Rodrigo de Carvalho as president. Again the movement was suppressed, and Acre remained part of Bolivia until 1903.

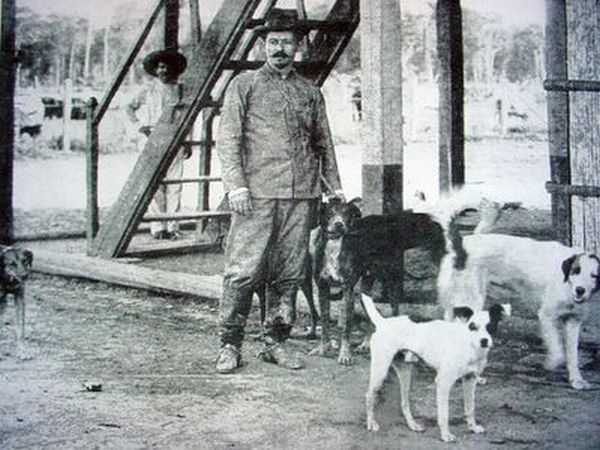
José Plácido de Castro

After the failure of the second attempt of Acre to secede from Bolivia, a veteran soldier from Rio Grande do Sul who had fought in the Federalist Revolution of 1893, José Plácido de Castro, was approached by the separatist Acre leaders and offered the opportunity to lead the independence movement against Bolivia. Castro, who had been working in Acre since 1899 as a chief surveyor of an expedition and was about to go back to Rio de Janeiro, accepted the offer. He imposed strict military discipline and reorganized the revolutionary army, which reached 30,000 men. The Acrean army won battle after battle and on 27 January 1903, José Plácido de Castro proclaimed the Third Republic of Acre. Brazilian president Rodrigues Alves ordered Brazilian troops into Northern Acre in order to replace Castro as the president of Acre. Through the Baron of Rio Branco's most able ministerial diplomacy, the issue was settled. After negotiations, the Treaty of Petrópolis was signed on 11 November 1903, with Bolivia agreeing to cede Acre to Brazil in exchange for lands in Mato Grosso, payment of two million pounds sterling and Brazil's commitment to build the Madeira-Mamoré Railroad that would allow Bolivia access to the outside world. On 25 February 1904, Acre was officially made a federal territory of Brazil.
