= Acre War =

Bolivia-Brazil border war (1899-1903)

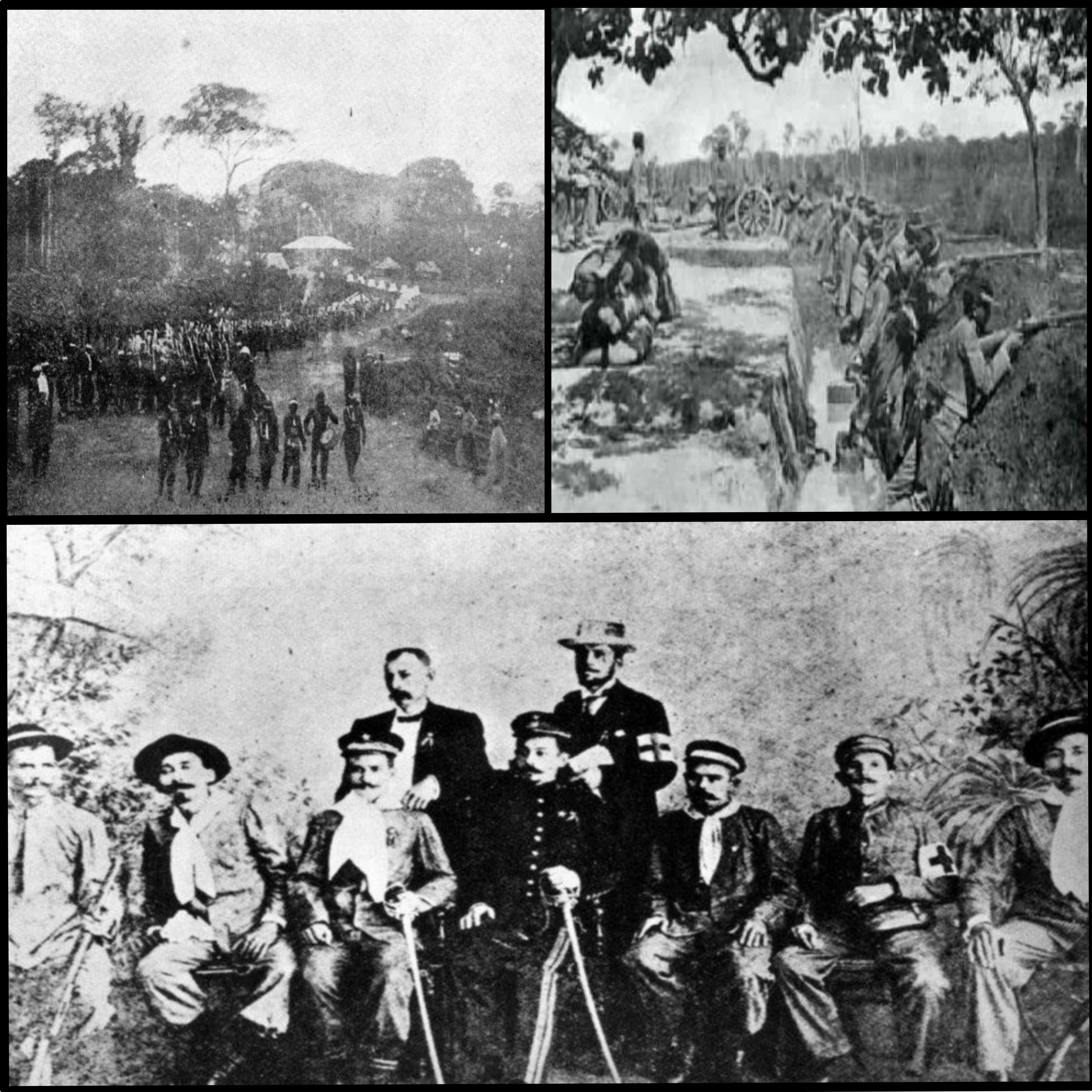
Date	1899–1903
Location	Acre, Bolivia
Result	Brazilian victory: Treaty of Petrópolis (between Bolivia and Brazil); Valerde-Río Branco Treaty (between Brazil and Peru); Polo-Bustamante Treaty (between Peru and Bolivia)
Territorial changes	Brazilian annexation of Acre

Belligerents
(Bolivia) Bolivia; Supported by: United States	Republic of Acre; Supported by: Brazil

Commanders and leaders
(Bolivia) José Manuel Pando (Bolivia) Federico Román (Bolivia) Nicolás Callaú (Bolivia) Bruno Racua	(Republic of Acre) Gálvez Rodríguez (Republic of Acre) Plácido de Castro (Brazil) Campos Sales (Brazil) Rodrigues Alves

Units involved
(Bolivia) Bolivian Army; Columna Porvenir (militia)	(Republic of Acre) Acrean tappers Civil militia Support: (Brazil) Brazilian Army

Casualties and losses
Unknown	500 Casualties

The Acre War, known in Brazil as Acrean Revolution (Portuguese: Revolução Acreana) and in Spanish as Guerra del Acre ("War of the Acre") was a border conflict between Bolivia and the First Brazilian Republic over the Acre Region, which was rich in rubber and gold deposits. The conflict had two phases between 1899 and 1903, and ended with an Acrean victory and the subsequent Treaty of Petrópolis, which ceded Acre to Brazil. The outcome also affected territories disputed with Peru.

== Causes ==
The region of Acre possessed rich gold deposits and an abundance of timber, principally rubber trees. From the end of the 19th century until the middle of the 20th century, rubber trees were crucial to the automobile and transport industry, as synthetic rubber for manufacturing tires and other objects was not discovered until around World War II. It is because of this that the war is also referred to as the Rubber War (Guerra del Caucho), for one of the motives that drove Jefferson José Torres, Governor of Amazonas, was a rubber export tax.

== Antecedents ==
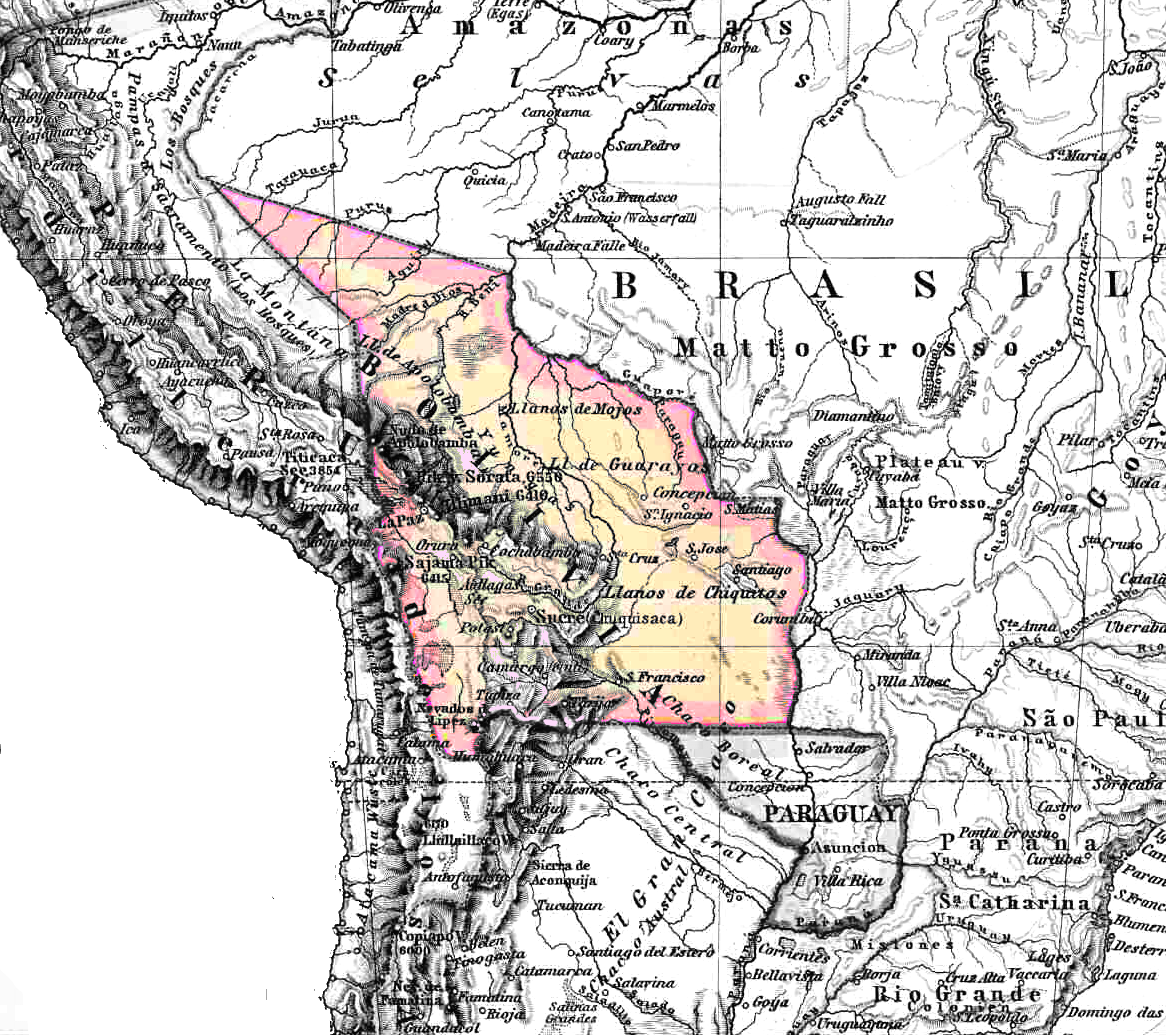
Map showing the Bolivian territory in 1899, before the Acrean Revolution

The border between Brazil and Bolivia was delimited by the Treaty of Ayacucho. The province of Acre, a territory about five times the size of Belgium, belonged to Bolivia. Embedded in the heart of South America, Acre aroused little interest for its inaccessibility and apparent lack of commercial value. Its population was composed of a small number of Indians, and a handful of Brazilians and Bolivians.

When the price of rubber rose significantly in the late 19th century, between 15,000 and 60,000 adventurers and settlers, most from Brazil, went to Acre to exploit the rubber trees. There were practically no roads, so the main means of transport were some river steamers, canoes, and rafts.

== First Republic of Acre ==
Seal of the former Republic of Acre

On January 2, 1899, Bolivia set up a customs office in Puerto Alonso (today Porto Acre), which upset the Brazilian settlers, who wanted to oust the Bolivian authorities. A lawyer, Dr. José de Carvalho, led a revolt against the Bolivians on April 30, 1899.

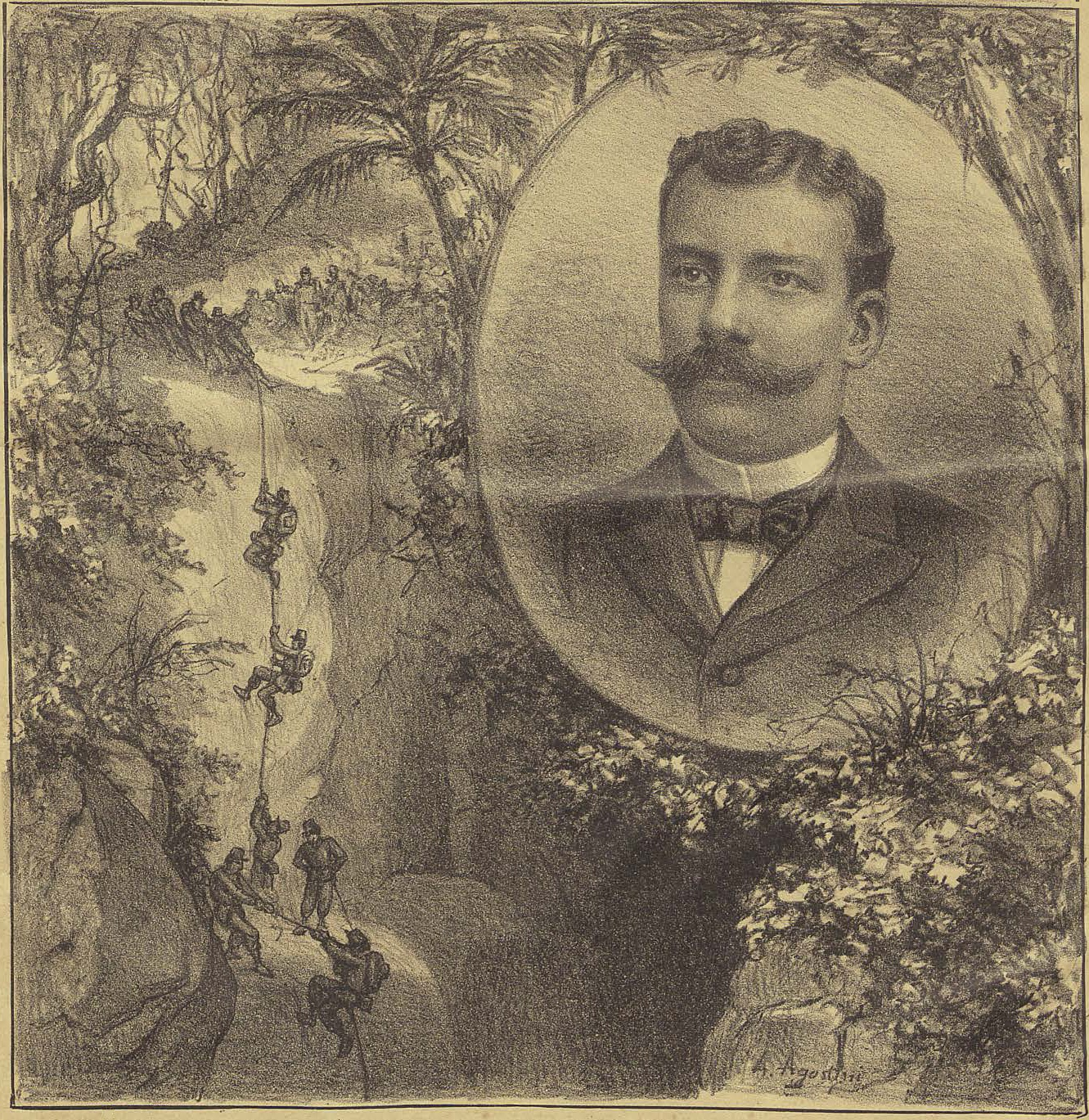
Colonel Ismael Montes, Bolivia's Minister of War and commander of the 1st Expedition to Acre

Pressured by José de Carvalho, Bolivians were forced to leave the region. To prevent their return, the governor of Amazonas, José Cardoso Ramalho Junior, organized a team to enter Acre, commanded by Spaniard Luis Gálvez Rodríguez de Arias, who served as a Bolivian consul in Belém. Gálvez left Manaus on June 4, 1899, and came to the Bolivian town of Puerto Alonso, which had its name changed to Porto Acre, where he proclaimed the Republic of Acre on July 14, 1899, discreetly supported by willing amazonense officialdom, imposing his authority on the lands that the Treaty of Ayacucho (1867) had entrusted to Bolivia. Bolivia responded by sending a force of 500 men. Before his arrival, Galvez was taken prisoner by Antonio de Sousa Braga, who declared himself president of Acre. Shortly afterward, however, he ceded power to Gálvez. On March 15, 1900, a Brazilian war flotilla reached Puerto Alonso, arrested Galvez, and dissolved the Republic of Acre, as the Brazilian government, based on the Treaty of Ayacucho, considered Acre as Bolivian territory.

== Second Republic of Acre ==
Bolivia organized a small military mission to occupy the region at that time. Arriving in Porto Acre, Brazilian rubber tappers prevented it from continuing its movement.

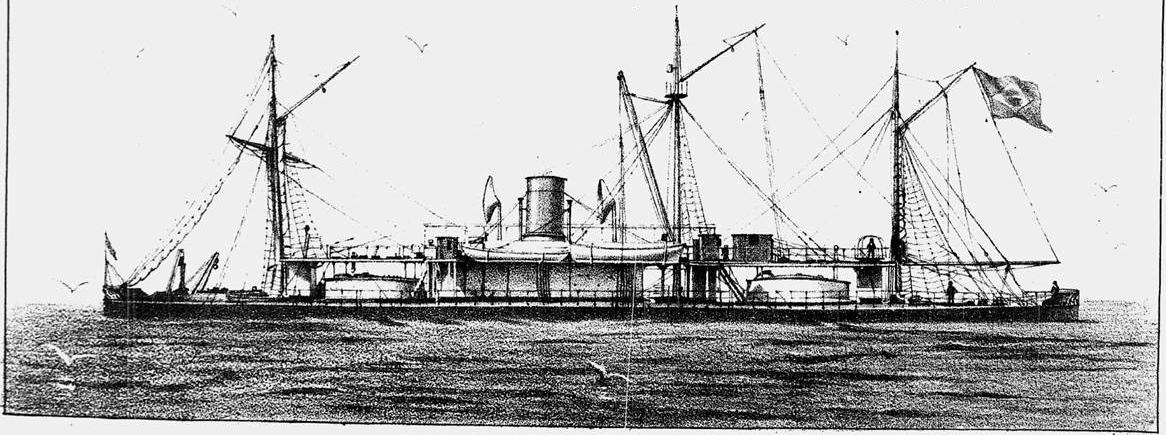
The steamer Solimões

In November 1900, another rebellion took place to take Acre from Bolivia and create an independent republic. Known as the "Expedition of Poets" or "Expedition Floriano Peixoto", this force, under the command of journalist Orlando Correa Lopes, was based on the river monitor Dovapor Solimões, equipped with the help of the governor of Amazonas province, Silvério José Néri. The Solimões operated on the Purus river and seized the vessel Alonso, renamed Ruy Barbosa. Carvalho Rodrigo became president of the newly declared Republic of Acre, whose forces had a light cannon, a machine gun, and about 200 men. Around Christmas 1900, this force attacked Puerto Alonso. It was defeated by the Bolivian military, resulting in the loss of a dozen men and the machine gun, eventually leading to the republic's dissolution. On December 29, the Bolivian vessel Rio Afua strengthened the garrison of Puerto Alonso.

On June 11, 1901, Bolivia signed a lease with a Bolivian Trading Company (also known as "Bolivian Syndicate of New York City", or simply "Bolivian Syndicate"), based in Jersey City, New Jersey. The company had some very influential shareholders, including the king of Belgium and relatives of William McKinley, then president of the United States. Bolivia had given the company almost total control over the Acre province to protect its sovereignty. Under the agreement, the U.S. and British capitalists would assume total control over the region, occupying and exploiting it for 30 years. At that time, Bolivia was ruled by General Jose Manuel Pando. The number of Brazilians in the region grew, searching for forest wealth, mainly in the northeast.

Brazil and Peru also claimed the territory and strongly disapproved of the lease act. Brazil withdrew the consul of Puerto Alonso and closed the tributaries of the Amazon River to trade with Bolivia. The international powers, who considered the basin as international waters, protested, leading Brazil to reduce the ban on war materials and release the Bolivian goods addressed to foreign nations.

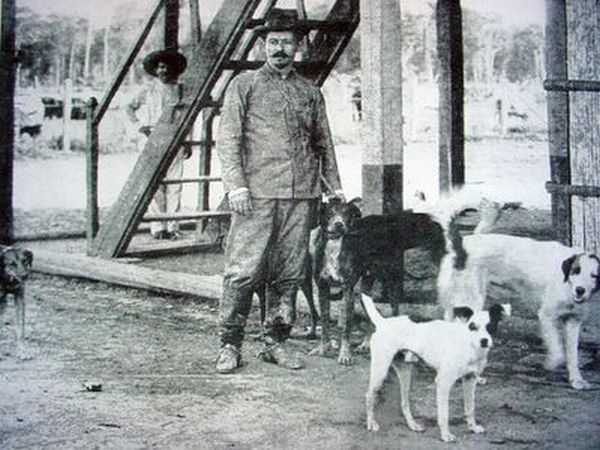
José Plácido de Castro (pictured by Percy Fawcett, 1907)

At 26 years old, having fought in the Federalist Revolution, the gaucho José Plácido de Castro came to Amazon. In 1902, rubber tappers made a deal with Castro. The military, believing that it could profit from the border struggle, offered Castro to train and command 2000 tappers to fight the Bolivians. At 5 a.m. on August 6, 1902, Castro led 33 riflemen in canoes on the Acre River. Castro quietly entered a wooden house in the city of Xapuri, where the Bolivian quartermaster depot was based. Soon, Castro took possession of the site and imprisoned the Bolivian military personnel. The local people mistook the group as part of the celebrations of the Bolivian Independence Day.

On September 18, a 180-man Bolivian battalion led by Colonel Rosendo Rojas surprised Castro's forces, which now had about 70 men. The Brazilians, armed with Winchester rifles, low on ammunition, and suffering from tropical diseases and desertions, lost twenty men and were defeated.

Castro then recruited another force with about a thousand men. Part of that force besieged the city of Puerto Alonso on May 19, 1902. On October 14, the force captured some external fortifications and captured the Río Afua, which was wrecked on the island during the fighting. The river vessel, renamed Independence, was used against its former owners. Despite the setback, the Bolivians obstinately kept Puerto Alonso.

Elsewhere, the Brazilian adventurers besieged Empresa, which capitulated on 15 October. Other battles, almost all won by the forces of Plácido, occurred in Bom Destino, Santa Rosa, and other coastal cities. On January 15, 1903, the Brazilian force attacked and captured some positions out of Puerto Alonso. The Independence, anchored upriver, was charged with thirty tons of high-quality rubber and focused on the passage by the Bolivian batteries to bring the river rubber down, which could be sold. The Plácido forces used the money to buy weapons and ammunition. On January 24, the Bolivians in Puerto Alonso surrendered to the rebels, who had taken the entire region. Three days later, on January 27, the Third Republic of Acre was proclaimed, now with the support of President Rodrigues Alves and his Foreign Minister, the Baron of Rio Branco, who ordered the Acre occupation and established a military government under the command of General Olimpio da Silveira.

The besieging force advanced towards the place where the rivers Chipamanu (also called Manuripe) and Tahuamanu meet to form the Rio Orton. Soon, a Bolivian force under General Jose Manuel Pando, the Bolivian President, took the opposite bank. However, before it did any significant combat, as a result of the excellent work of diplomacy by the Baron of Rio Branco, the governments of Brazil and Bolivia signed a preliminary treaty on March 21, 1903, finally ratifying the Treaty of Petrópolis on November 11, 1903.

By said treaty Bolivia gave up Acre in exchange for Brazilian territory from the State of Mato Grosso, the payment of 2 million pounds (~ 640 million réis) and the promise to construct the Madeira-Mamoré Railroad; linking the Mamoré River and the Madeira River to allow the flow of regional production, particularly rubber. Joaquim Francisco de Assis Brazil actively participated in the negotiations with Bolivia, representing the Brazilian government in its signature. The Bolivian Syndicate was compensated with 110,000 pounds (~ $35 million réis). The taxes collected from Brazilian Acre financed the damages and the loan for constructing the railway over 30 years.

The first of Placido Castro's decrees took place on January 26, 1903, applying Brazilian law until the enactment of a state constitution. It is considered valid for all land titles issued by Bolivia or the state of Amazonas, defines the Portuguese language as official, and adopts the Brazilian monetary standard.

The Treaty of Petrópolis, signed in 1903 by the Baron of Rio Branco and Assis Brazil, was approved by Brazilian federal law on February 25, 1904, and regulated by a presidential decree of April 7, 1904, incorporating Acre as part of Brazil. Placido de Castro, who died on August 11, 1908, was the first president of the Acre Territory. Castro, the Baron of Rio Branco and Assis Brazil became namesakes of the state capital (Rio Branco) and two counties (Assis Brazil and Plácido de Castro).

The Acrean Revolution demonstrated Brazil's advantage over its neighbors because of its downstream location. The rivers that run almost the entire continent are born in the Andes and flow into the Atlantic Ocean. Brazil could send reinforcements to the disputed area by the rivers, while the Bolivians had to cross the Andes.

Rubber barons, particularly Nicolás Suárez Callaú, fully funded the Bolivian effort. For the second time, Bolivia lost sparsely populated territory in its periphery to a militarily stronger and more centralized neighbor (the first was in the War of the Pacific).

== Treaty of Petrópolis ==
In 1867, the "Treaty of Peace and Friendship", or the Ayacucho Bolivia Treaty, had yielded 164,242 square kilometers of area, which Brazil annexed to the then-province and present state of Amazonas. The Treaty of Petrópolis is a peace treaty signed between Bolivia and Brazil in the Brazilian city of Petrópolis on November 17, 1903. Bolivia yielded an approximate area of 191,000 square kilometers, which mainly corresponds to the current state of Acre, Brazil.
