= Silvério José Néri =

Brazilian politician

Silvério José Nery
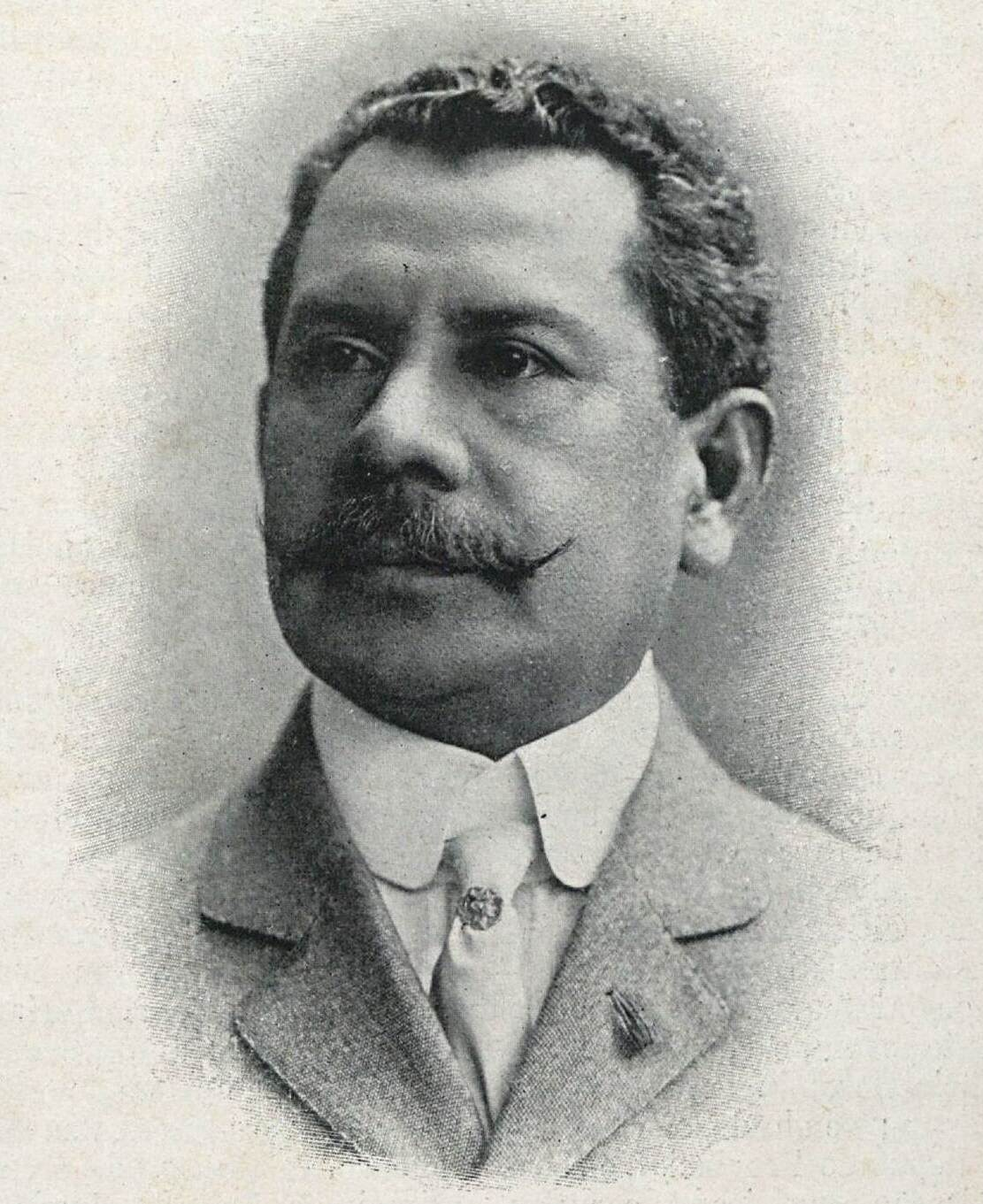

Federal deputy
- In office 1897–1899

Federal senator
- In office 1900–1900

10th Governor of Amazonas
- In office 23 July 1900 – 2 December 1903
- Preceded by: José Cardoso Ramalho Júnior
- Succeeded by: Antônio Constantino Néri

Federal senator
- In office 1904–1930

Personal details
- Born: 8 October 1858 Coari, Amazonas; Brazil
- Died: 23 June 1934 (aged 75) Manaus, Amazonas; Brazil
- Occupation: Politician

Silvério José Néri (8 October 1858 – 23 June 1934) was a Brazilian soldier and politician who was a federal deputy from 1897 to 1899, governor of the state of Amazonas from 1900 to 1903 and a senator from 1904 to 1930.

== Early years ==
His father was Silvério Nery, and his mother was Maria Antony Nery. One of his brothers, Antônio Constantino Nery, was senator from 1901 to 1904 and then succeeded him as governor of Amazonas. Another brother, Raimundo Constantino Nery, was a federal deputy from 1903 to 1905. Silvério José Nery completed his secondary education at the Diocesan Seminary of Manaus, then attended the Praia Vermelha Military Academy in Rio de Janeiro, where he qualified as a surveyor. He returned to Manaus and soon after joined the Liberal Party and retired from the army. He married Maria Maquiné da Silva, with whom he had six children (including Mario José Nery, Silverio José Nery, Lydia Nery (Cabral), Julio José da Silva Nery and Paulo José da Silva Nery).

Nery was elected provincial deputy in 1882 and was reelected in 1886, holding office until 1889. The Republic was declared on 15 November 1889. He was elected state representative in 1893, holding office until 1896. He was elected federal deputy from 1897 to 1899. He was elected to the federal Senate in 1900, but left this position when he was elected governor of Amazonas the same year, succeeding José Cardoso Ramalho Júnior.

== Governor of Amazonas ==
Silvério José Nery took office on 23 July 1900.

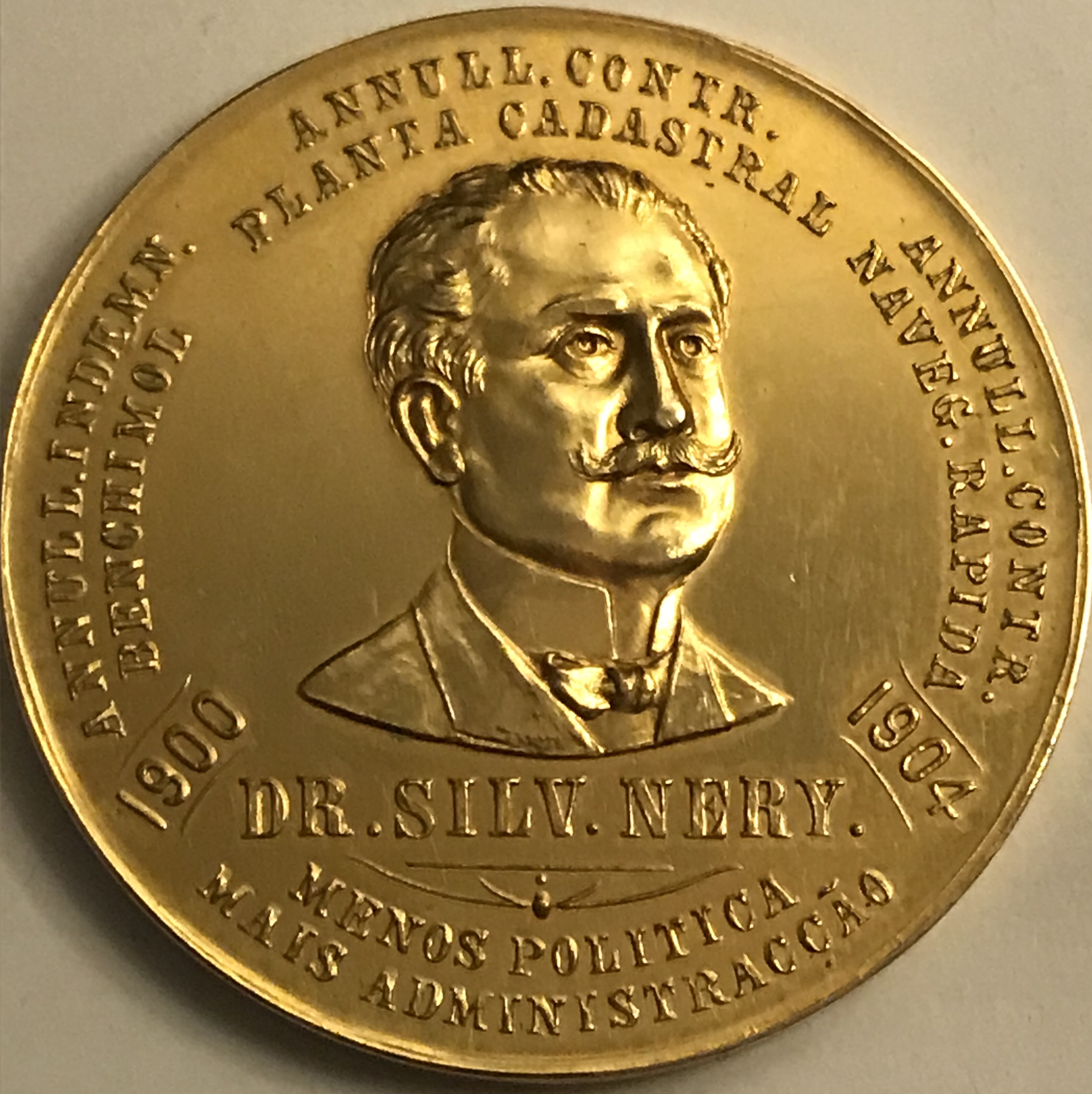
Dr.Silv.Nery.Medal

He intended to centralise the public administration, and therefore abolished the four departments into which the state had been divided. To strengthen the General Secretariat of the state, he appointed as secretary general the retired Colonel Antônio Clemente Ribeiro Bittencourt. He attempted to consolidate the state's debt by issuing 7% bearer bonds redeemable in ten years. Under pressure, the government was forced to cut the rate to 5% and extend the period to 30 years.

At the time Acre belonged to Bolivia, but was mainly occupied by Brazilian rubber tappers. In July 1899 the Brazilians in Acre declared the Independent Republic of Acre. This was quickly dissolved by troops sent by the Brazilian government. Bolivia sent a small military mission to occupy Acre. Nery dispatched an expedition to Acre led by the journalist Orlando Correia Lopes. It was known as the "Poets Expedition" due to the intellectuals among its members, which declared a second Independent Republic of Acre in November 1900. The republic was overthrown by Bolivian troops. Bolivian president José Manuel Pando obtained approval from his Congress on 21 December 1901 for a plan under which an Anglo-American "Bolivian syndicate" would obtain a long-term lease for rubber extraction in Acre. José Plácido de Castro was given command of an armed uprising that eventually took control of Acre on 24 January 1903. The Treaty of Petrópolis was signed on 17 November 1903, redefining the border between Bolivia and Brazil and creating the territory of Acre, separate from Amazonas.

Nery enforced processing of rubber in Amazonas, rather than shipping the raw rubber downstream to Pará to be processed for export. In June 1903, he inaugurated the Port of Manaus operated by the Manaus Harbour Limited Company. He also funded new shipping lines serving various ports in the interior. One of Nery's last acts was to inaugurate a new building for the Públio Bittencourt School.

== Later years ==
Silvério José Nery left office on 2 December 1903. He resigned before the end of his term since the state constitution did not allow a governor to be succeeded by a close relative, and his brother planned to run for election. The deputy governor Francisco Benedito da Fonseca Coutinho headed the government until 23 July 1904, then handed over to his brother Antônio Constantino Nery. In 1904 Silvério José Nery returned to the Senate, where he was reelected in consecutive elections until 1930. He died in Manaus on 23 June 1934.

== Sources ==
- Herói Brasileiro: Plácido de Castro (in Portuguese), Folha de S. Paulo: Enciclopédia Mirador Internacional
- Maria Eugenia Bertarelli (2010), NERY, Silvério José (PDF) (in Portuguese), Centro de Pesquisa e Documentação de História Contemporânea do Brasil
- Pedraja, René De La (11 April 2006), Wars of Latin America, 1899-1941, McFarland, ISBN 978-0-7864-8257-3
- Sergio Lamarão; Inoã Carvalho Urbinati, CASTRO, Plácido de (PDF) (in Portuguese), Centro de Pesquisa e Documentação de História Contemporânea do Brasil
