= Paulo do Rio Branco =

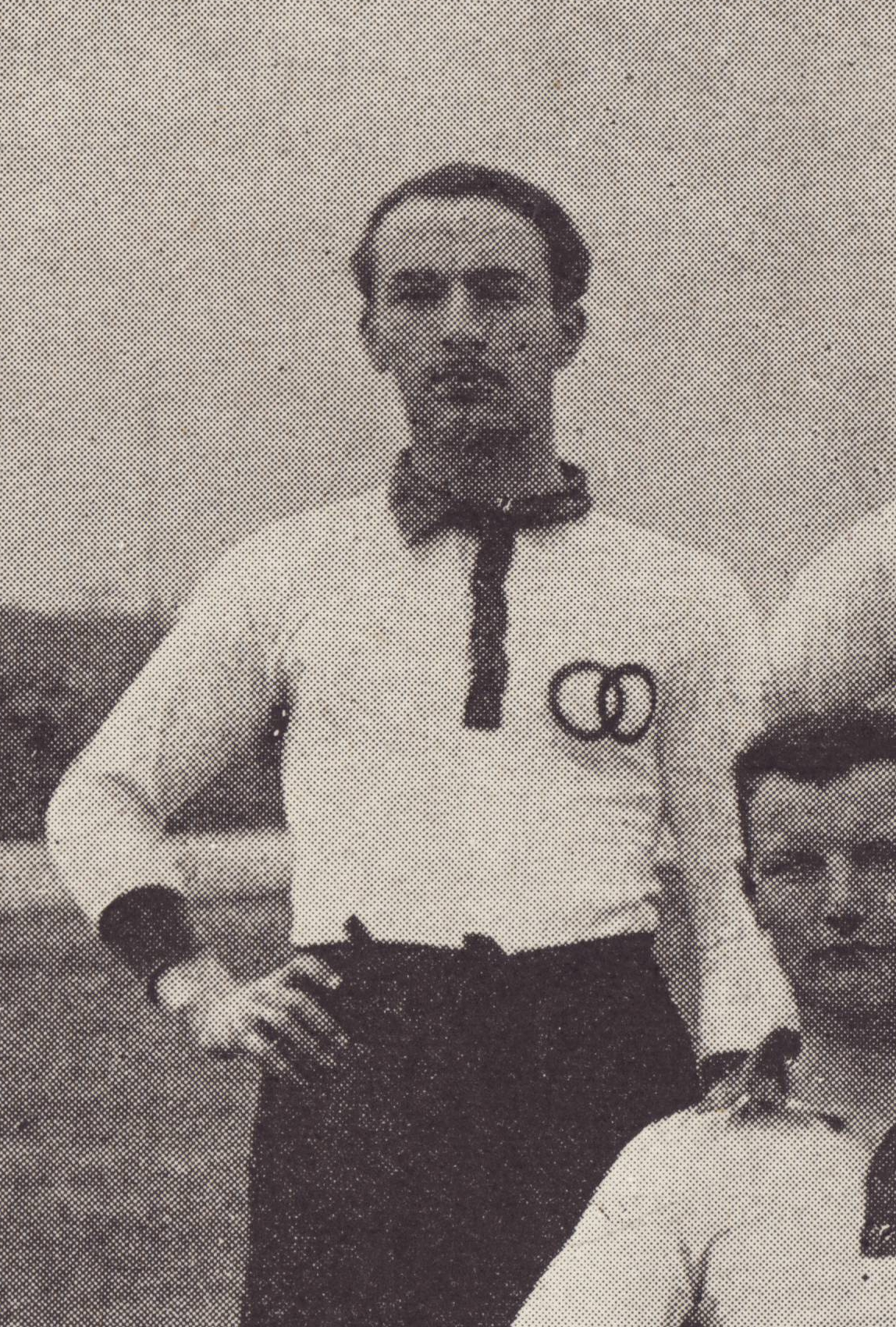
- Paulo do Rio Branco in 1896
- Born: Paulo do Rio Branco da Silva Paranhos; July 10, 1876 Paris
- Died: February 17, 1927 Paris
- Height: 1.76 m (5 ft 9 1/2 in)
- Weight: 78.5 kg (173 lb)

Rugby union career
- Position(s): Hooker, Fullback
Amateur team(s)
Years	Team	Apps	(Points)
1893-1901	Stade Français		

Paulo Agenor do Rio Branco da Silva Paranhos (Paris, July 10, 1876 – Paris, February 17, 1927) was a French-born Brazilian rugby union player. He was the son of the Baron of Rio Branco and Marie Philomène Stevens (a dancer of Belgian origin).

He studied medicine in Paris, where he settled, becoming a surgeon. He was the first Brazilian rugby union player of international level, and became a celebrity in France. He first played as a hooker, but later moved to fullback.

Rio Branco was one of the best players for the legendary French team of Stade Français, winning six titles of National Champion, in 1893, 1894, 1895, 1897, 1898 and 1901. He was also twice vice champion, in 1896 and 1899. A dual French and Brazilian citizen, he played for France in unofficial matches.

He served as a volunteer at World War I, as a civilian physician for the French-Brazilian hospital, depending from the Red Cross. He became a knight of the Legion of Honour for his services during wartime.
