= São Gabriel, Rio Grande do Sul =

Municipality of Rio Grande do Sul, Brazil

São Gabriel
- Municipality
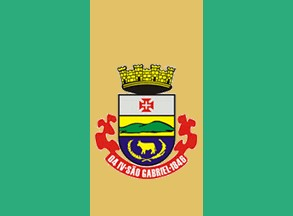
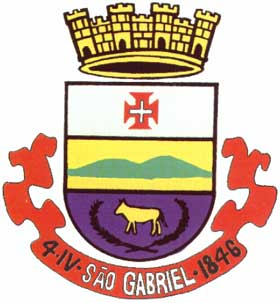
- Flag Coat of arms

- Location within Rio Grande do Sul

- Location in Brazil
- Coordinates: 30°20′9″S 54°19′12″W
- Country: Brazil
- State: Rio Grande do Sul

Population (2020)
  - Total: 62,147
- Time zone: UTC−3 (BRT)

São Gabriel is a municipality in the state of Rio Grande do Sul, Brazil.

== Notable people ==
- Sepe Tiaraju (-1756), Indigenous chief and military leader, killed in São Gabriel at the hands of Portuguese and Spanish colonial soldiers.
- Baron of Candiota (c. 1815–1894), landowner and military officer
- Hermes da Fonseca (1855–1923), 8th president of Brazil
- Joaquim Francisco de Assis Brasil (1857–1938), politician
- José Plácido de Castro (1873–1908), revolutionary and military leader in the Acre War
- Mascarenhas de Morais (1883–1968), commander of the Brazilian Expeditionary Force in World War II

== Paleontology ==
In the vicinity of the city of São Gabriel fossils of ancient amphibians and reptiles whose ages range from the Permian to the Triassic have been found .

Three vertebrate-bearing geological formations and localities are as follows:

1. Irati Formation (Passo São Borja). Age: Early Permian.
2. Rio do Rasto Formation (Posto Queimado). Age: Late Permian and/or Early Triassic.
3. Sanga do Cabral Formation (Abandoned railroad between Dilermando de Aguiar and São Gabriel). Age: Late Triassic.

== Climate ==
Climate data for São Gabriel, Rio Grande do Sul (1976–2005)
Month	Jan	Feb	Mar	Apr	May	Jun	Jul	Aug	Sep	Oct	Nov	Dec	Year
Record high °C (°F)	37.0 (98.6)	35.4 (95.7)	34.3 (93.7)	31.7 (89.1)	28.6 (83.5)	27.0 (80.6)	27.8 (82.0)	29.4 (84.9)	29.8 (85.6)	32.8 (91.0)	34.6 (94.3)	36.7 (98.1)	37.0 (98.6)
Mean daily maximum °C (°F)	31.2 (88.2)	30.0 (86.0)	28.5 (83.3)	24.9 (76.8)	21.5 (70.7)	18.7 (65.7)	18.8 (65.8)	20.3 (68.5)	21.9 (71.4)	24.8 (76.6)	27.4 (81.3)	30.4 (86.7)	24.9 (76.8)
Daily mean °C (°F)	25.4 (77.7)	24.6 (76.3)	23.1 (73.6)	19.7 (67.5)	16.5 (61.7)	14.0 (57.2)	13.9 (57.0)	15.2 (59.4)	16.7 (62.1)	19.3 (66.7)	21.6 (70.9)	24.3 (75.7)	19.5 (67.2)
Mean daily minimum °C (°F)	19.5 (67.1)	19.2 (66.6)	17.8 (64.0)	14.5 (58.1)	11.5 (52.7)	9.3 (48.7)	9.1 (48.4)	10.2 (50.4)	11.4 (52.5)	13.8 (56.8)	15.8 (60.4)	18.2 (64.8)	14.2 (57.5)
Record low °C (°F)	13.1 (55.6)	12.7 (54.9)	10.4 (50.7)	6.8 (44.2)	3.3 (37.9)	1.1 (34.0)	1.1 (34.0)	1.8 (35.2)	3.2 (37.8)	6.1 (43.0)	8.9 (48.0)	11.9 (53.4)	1.1 (34.0)
Average precipitation mm (inches)	139.5 (5.49)	132.8 (5.23)	127.9 (5.04)	186.5 (7.34)	132.3 (5.21)	115.8 (4.56)	131.6 (5.18)	85.0 (3.35)	152.3 (6.00)	139.9 (5.51)	128.5 (5.06)	118.4 (4.66)	1,590.5 (62.63)
Average relative humidity (%)	73	67	75	74	81	76	81	81	78	73	67	64	74
Mean monthly sunshine hours	264	219	227	192	174	134	155	166	179	222	247	274	2,453
Source: Empresa Brasileira de Pesquisa Agropecuária (EMBRAPA)

== See also ==
- List of municipalities in Rio Grande do Sul
