= Luis Gálvez =

First President of the Republic of Acre (1864–1935)

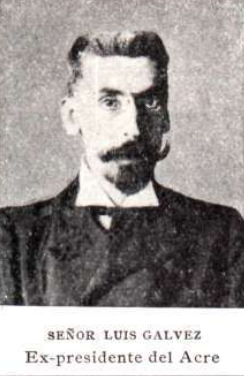

1st President of the Republic of Acre
- In office 14 July 1899 – 1 January 1900
- Preceded by: Office Established
- Succeeded by: Antônio de Sousa Braga

3rd President of the Republic of Acre
- In office 30 January 1900 – 15 March 1900
- Preceded by: Antônio de Sousa Braga
- Succeeded by: Joaquim Vítor da Silva

Personal details
- Born: Luis Gálvez Rodríguez de Arias; 1864 San Fernando, Andalusia, Spain
- Died: 1935 (aged 71) Madrid, Community of Madrid, Spain
- Education: University of Seville
- Occupation: Journalist, diplomat

Luis Gálvez Rodríguez de Arias (1864–1935) was a Spanish journalist, diplomat and adventurer who proclaimed the Republic of Acre in 1899. He ruled Acre between 14 July 1899 and 1 January 1900 for the first time, and between 30 January and 15 March 1900, for the second and last time.

== Biography ==
Gálvez studied legal and social sciences at the University of Seville and later worked in the Spanish diplomatic service in Rome and Buenos Aires. He migrated to South America to look for the El Dorado of the Amazon rainforest, in 1897. In Belém, he worked as a journalist at the Correio do Pará. In Manaus, he wrote for the newspaper Commercio do Amazonas.

Soon after the Bolivian government signed a rubber trade and export agreement, through a Lease Agreement with a union of foreign capitalists, the Bolivian Syndicate, chaired by the son of the then president of the United States, Gálvez received a copy of the document to be translated into English, as an employee of the Bolivian Consulate in Belém.

He then took the matter to the attention of Governor Ramalho Júnior and revealed his intention to promote the independence of Acre. The Governor clandestinely supported the idea, providing financial resources, weapons, ammunition, provisions, a specially chartered ship equipped with a cannon and a twenty-man garrison.

He then led a rebellion in Acre, with rubber tappers and veterans of the Cuban War of Independence on 14 July 1899, purposely the date of the one hundred and tenth anniversary of the Fall of the Bastille. He founded the independent Republic of Acre, justifying that "not being Brazilian, rubber tappers in Acre did not accept becoming Bolivian". He implemented the government of the country, which the United States classified as a "rubber country".

Called "Emperor of Acre", he assumed the provisional position of president, instituted the Arms of the Republic, the flag, organized ministries, created schools, hospitals, an army, fire department, served as a judge, issued postage stamps and idealized a modern country for that time, with social, environmental and urban concerns. He also issued decrees and sent dispatches to every country in Europe, in addition to appointing diplomatic representatives.

A coup d'état in his government with just six months of existence removed him from office, being replaced by the Brazilian rubber tapper Antônio de Sousa Braga, who a month later returned power to Gálvez.

The Treaty of Ayacucho, signed in 1867 between Brazil and Bolivia recognized Acre as a Bolivian possession. Therefore, Brazil dispatched a military expedition consisting of four warships and another leading infantry troops to arrest Luis Gálvez, end the Republic of Acre and return the region to Bolivian rule. On 11 March 1900 Luis Gálvez surrendered to the task force of the Brazilian Navy, at the headquarters of the Caquetá rubber plantation, on the banks of the Acre River, to later be exiled to Recife, Pernambuco. He was later deported to Europe.

Gálvez returned to Brazil years later, but the government of Amazonas arrested him and sent him back to the Fort of São Joaquim do Rio Branco, today in the state of Roraima, from where he would later flee. He died in Spain.

== Legacy ==
- There is a river named after him in Acre.
- At the entrance to the Legislative Assembly of the State of Acre (ALEAC) there is a statue of Gálvez and behind him the flag of the Independent State of Acre. In it, it is written "If the Homeland does not want us, we create another one! Long live the Independent State of Acre!", A phrase that was uttered by Galvez on 14 July 1899 , during the declaration of the Republic of Acre to the population that lived there. The phrase became a "catchphrase" and, to this day – more than a century after it was said by Emperor Gálvez – most Acreans do not know it perfectly.
- Gálvez - Imperador de Acre is the first novel of Márcio Souza, it was launched in 1976 and went through numerous editions.
- In 2007, Rede Globo aired a miniseries entitled Amazônia, from Galvez to Chico Mendes, dedicated to the region of the state of Acre. Actor José Wilker portrays Luis Gálvez Rodríguez Arias.
- In 2003, Spanish writer Alfonso Domingo published a historical novel whose main character is Luis Gálvez (see Bibliography).

== Bibliography ==
- DOMINGO, Alfonso – La estrella solitaria. Seville: Algaida, 2003 – Book on the life of Luis Gálvez
- Interview with the author Alfonso Domingo
- Book reveals Luis Gálvez to the Spanish
- MATIAS, Francisco, "The Treaty of Petrópolis, Diplomacy and War on the Western Frontier of Brazil".
