= Porto Acre =

Municipality of Acre, Brazil

- Municipality
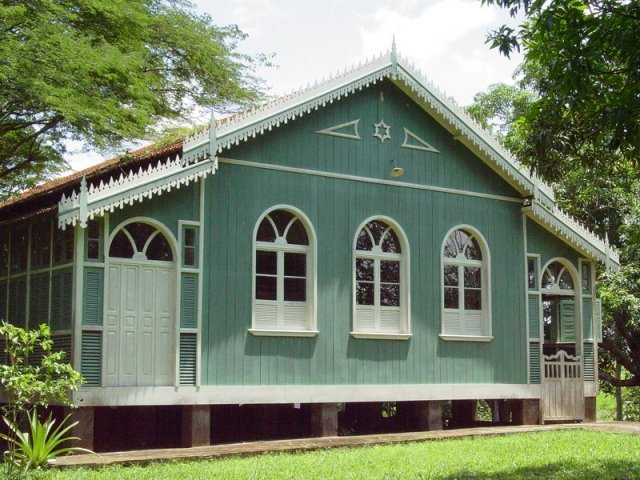
- Historic house with Carpenter Gothic architecture, in Porto Acre, Brazil

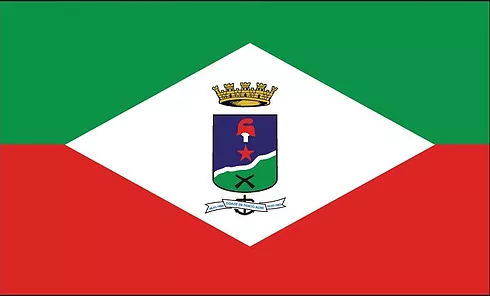
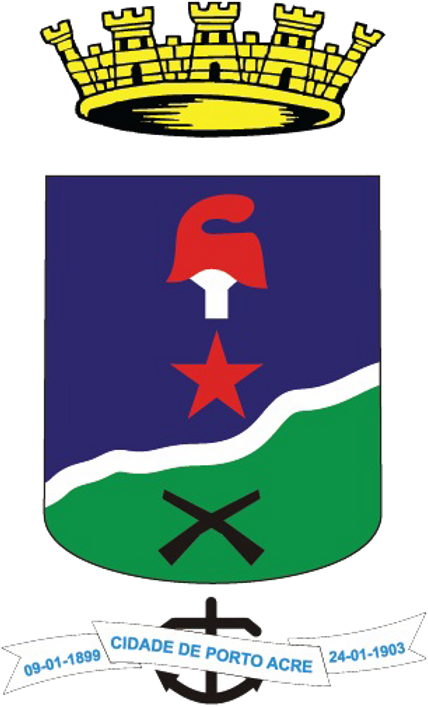
- Flag Coat of arms

- Location of municipality in Acre State

- Location in Brazil
- Coordinates: 9°35′16″S 67°31′58″W
- Country: Brazil
- State: Acre
- Founded: January 3, 1899

Government
  - Mayor: Bené Damasceno (Solidariedade)

Area
  - Total: 1,153 sq mi (2,985 km^{2})

Population (2020 est)
  - Total: 18,824
- Time zone: UTC−5 (ACT)
- Website: portoacre.ac.gov.br

Porto Acre (Brazilian Portuguese pronunciation: [ˈpoʁtu ˈakɾi]), originally called Puerto Alonso during Bolivian rule, is a municipality located in the northeast of the Brazilian state of Acre. The economy is mainly based on agriculture. As of 2020 the municipality had an estimated population of 18,824.

== Geography ==
Porto Acre is in the eastern part of the state of Acre, to the north of the BR-364 highway and Rio Branco. The municipal seat is on the left (west) bank of the Acre River, a tributary of the Purus River that runs through the municipality from south to north. The town can be accessed by boat along the Acre River or by land along the AC-010 highway which runs north from Rio Branco for 78 kilometres (48 mi). The distance from Rio Branco as the crow flies is 51 kilometres (32 mi). Porto Acre is limited to the north by the state of Amazonas, to the west and south by the municipality of Bujari, to the south by Rio Branco and to the east by the municipality of Senador Guiomard.

== History ==
The settlement is founded in Jan 3rd, 1899 by José Paravicini while Acre was under Bolivian rule, and was named "Puerto Alonso" in honor of the then Bolivian president Severo Fernández Alonso Caballero.

That year, Luis Gálvez Rodríguez de Arias expelled the Bolivians and declared the Independent State of Acre. He renamed Puerto Alonso to Cidade do Acre and made it the headquarters of the new state. The state created a flag, minted its own currency, drafted a constitution, appointed ministers and formed an army. However, Galves was deposed and arrested after a few months and the Bolivians regained control.

At the start of 1902 José Plácido de Castro accepted an invitation to lead a revolt against Bolivia. He took a boat up the Acre River, ostensibly to conduct land surveys in the south but in practice carrying arms and ammunition. He stopped off briefly in Puerto Alonso to meet the Bolivian governor Lino Romero and evaluate his future opponent. In the south he organised the rubber tappers and other inhabitants for the revolt. He then returned to Brazil, bypassing Puerto Alonso to avoid alerting the Bolivians.

Plácido captured Xapuri on 6 August 1902 and next day proclaimed that Acre was independent. On 14 October 1902 the rebels captured some of the outer defences of Puerto Alonso and the armed Bolivian launch Rio Afua, which they renamed the Independencia. Plácido de Castro surrounded the town on 8 January 1903, and launched an attack on 15 January 1903 that soon petered out. His men started to dig zigzag trenches to the Bolivian lines. Eventually, with his forces exhausted and almost out of ammunition, Romero surrendered on 24 January 1903.

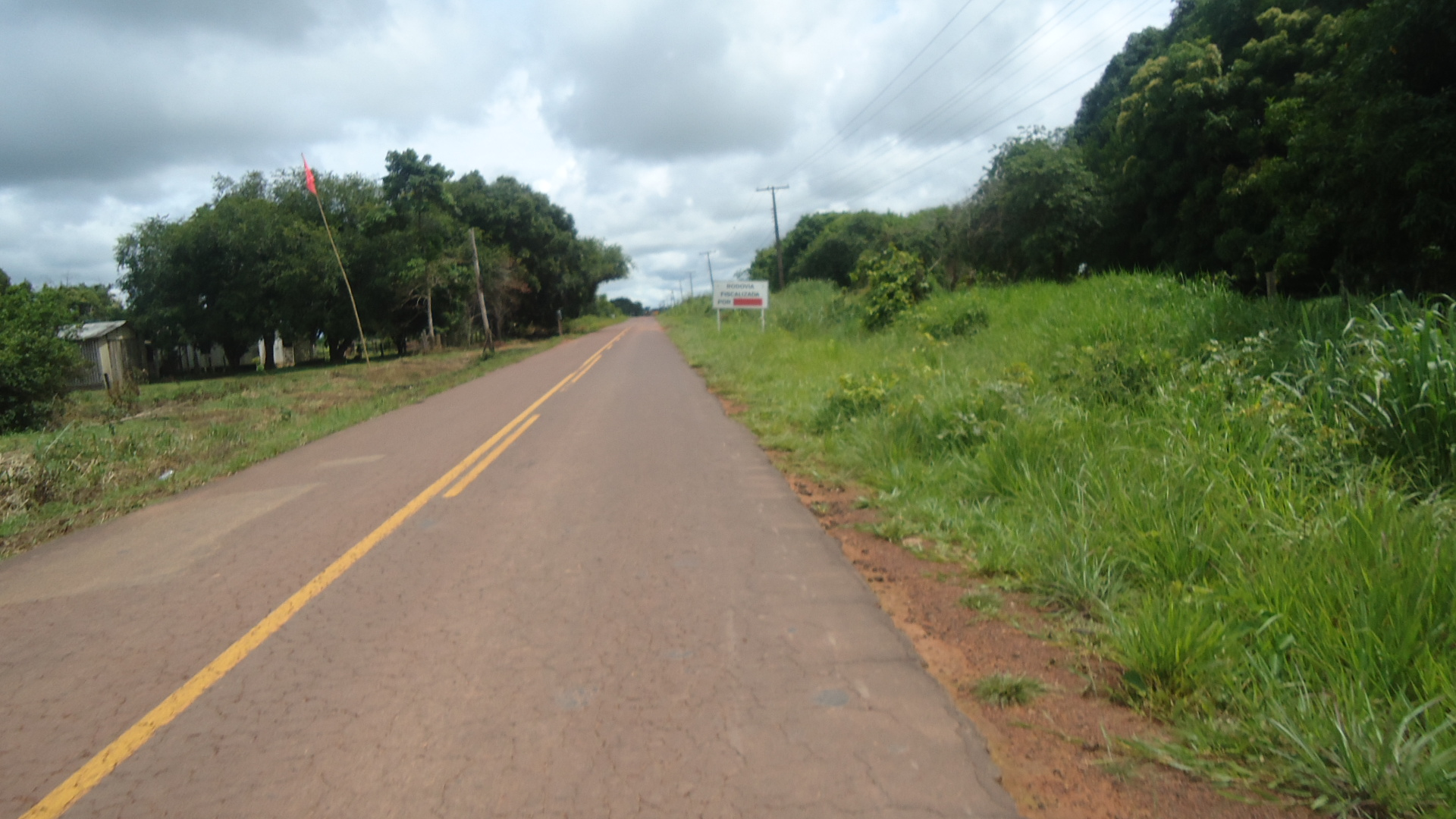
AC-010 in Porto Acre

== Recent years ==
The municipality of Porto Acre gained autonomy on 28 April 1992 when it was separated from the Rio Branco municipality. The first mayor and councillors took office of 1 January 1993. According to the 2010 census the municipality has a population of 14,806. The municipality has an area of 2,604.725 square kilometres (1,005.690 sq mi) and a population density of 5.71 inhabitants per square kilometre. The local football teams include Valência Porto Acre, Porto Acre AC, and AA Águia.

Porto Acre's economy is based on extraction of rubber, Brazil nut and wood processing, small-scale livestock, horticultural products and general commerce. The Acre River is still used for movement of goods and people. During the dry season its fertile banks are used to grow watermelon, banana, vegetables, cassava and other food crops. There are nine settlement projects with a total area of 126,700 hectares (313,000 acres), or 44.1% of the municipal area.

== Sources ==
- História de Porto Acre (in Portuguese), Municipality of Porto Acre
- Pedraja, René De La (2006-04-11), Wars of Latin America, 1899-1941, McFarland, ISBN 978-0-7864-8257-3
- "Porto Acre - AC", Brasil Channel (in Portuguese)
- Porto Acre (in Portuguese), State of Acre, archived from the original on 2019-02-20
- Scheina, Robert L. (2003-07-31), Latin America's Wars Volume II: The Age of the Professional Soldier, 1900-2001, Potomac Books, Inc., ISBN 978-1-59797-478-3
- Senador Jorge Viana, Plácido de Castro (in Portuguese)
- Sergio Lamarão; Inoã Carvalho Urbinati, CASTRO, Plácido de (PDF) (in Portuguese), Centro de Pesquisa e Documentação de História Contemporânea do Brasil
