= José Paranhos, Baron of Rio Branco =

Brazilian nobleman, diplomat, geographer, historian, politician and professor

His Excellency The Baron of Rio Branco
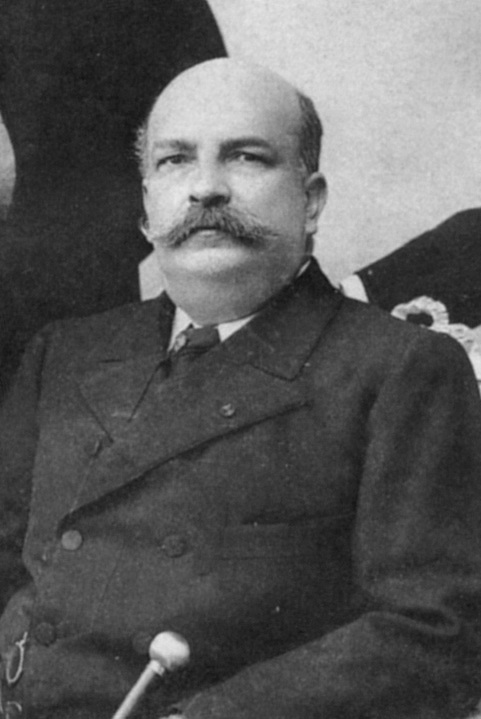
- The Baron of Rio Branco c. 1898

Minister of Foreign Affairs
- In office 3 December 1902 – 10 February 1912
- President: Rodrigues Alves; Afonso Pena; Nilo Peçanha; Hermes da Fonseca
- Preceded by: Olinto de Magalhães
- Succeeded by: Lauro Müller

Ambassador of Brazil to Germany
- In office 16 April 1901 – 10 November 1902
- Nominated by: Campos Sales
- Preceded by: Cyro de Azevedo
- Succeeded by: José Pereira da Costa Motta

Member of the Chamber of Deputies
- In office 11 May 1869 – 10 October 1875
- Constituency: Mato Grosso

Personal details
- Born: José Maria da Silva Paranhos Júnior; 20 April 1845 Rio de Janeiro, Neutral Municipality, Brazil
- Died: 10 February 1912 (aged 66) Rio de Janeiro, Federal District, Brazil
- Party: Conservative (1868–1889); Independent (1889–1912)
- Spouse: Marie Philomène Stevens (m. 1889; died 1898)
- Children: 5, including Paulo
- Parents: Viscount of Rio Branco (father); Teresa de Figueiredo Faria (mother)
- Education: Faculty of Law of Recife
- Profession: Diplomat
- José Maria da Silva Paranhos Júnior's voice Recorded 1908

José Maria da Silva Paranhos Júnior, Baron of Rio Branco (Portuguese: Barão do Rio Branco; 20 April 1845 – 10 February 1912) was a Brazilian statesman, diplomat, geographer, historian, politician and professor, considered to be the "Patron of Brazilian diplomacy". Rio Branco was the son of statesman José Paranhos, Viscount of Rio Branco.

As a representative of Brazil, he managed to peacefully resolve all the country's border disputes with its South American neighbours in the early 20th century, incorporating 900 thousand square kilometers (roughly 10% of Brazil's current territory) through his diplomacy alone. He was also a member of the Brazilian Academy of Letters, occupying its 34th chair from 1898 until his death in 1912.

== Biography ==
=== Early life ===
José Paranhos Júnior was born in Rio de Janeiro in 1845, as son of José Maria da Silva Paranhos Sr, Viscount of Rio Branco, future Prime Minister of Brazil and famous statesman and his wife, Teresa de Figueiredo Faria. He began his work in the letters in 1863, in the pages of the ''Popular'' magazine, with a biography of Luís Barroso Pereira, commander of the frigate Imperatriz. Later, in 1866, in the magazine L'Illustration, he drew and wrote about the Paraguayan War, defending the point of view of Brazil. In 1868, he replaced for three months Joaquim Manuel de Macedo as lecturer of Chorography and History of Brazil, in Colégio Pedro II.

=== Diplomacy ===
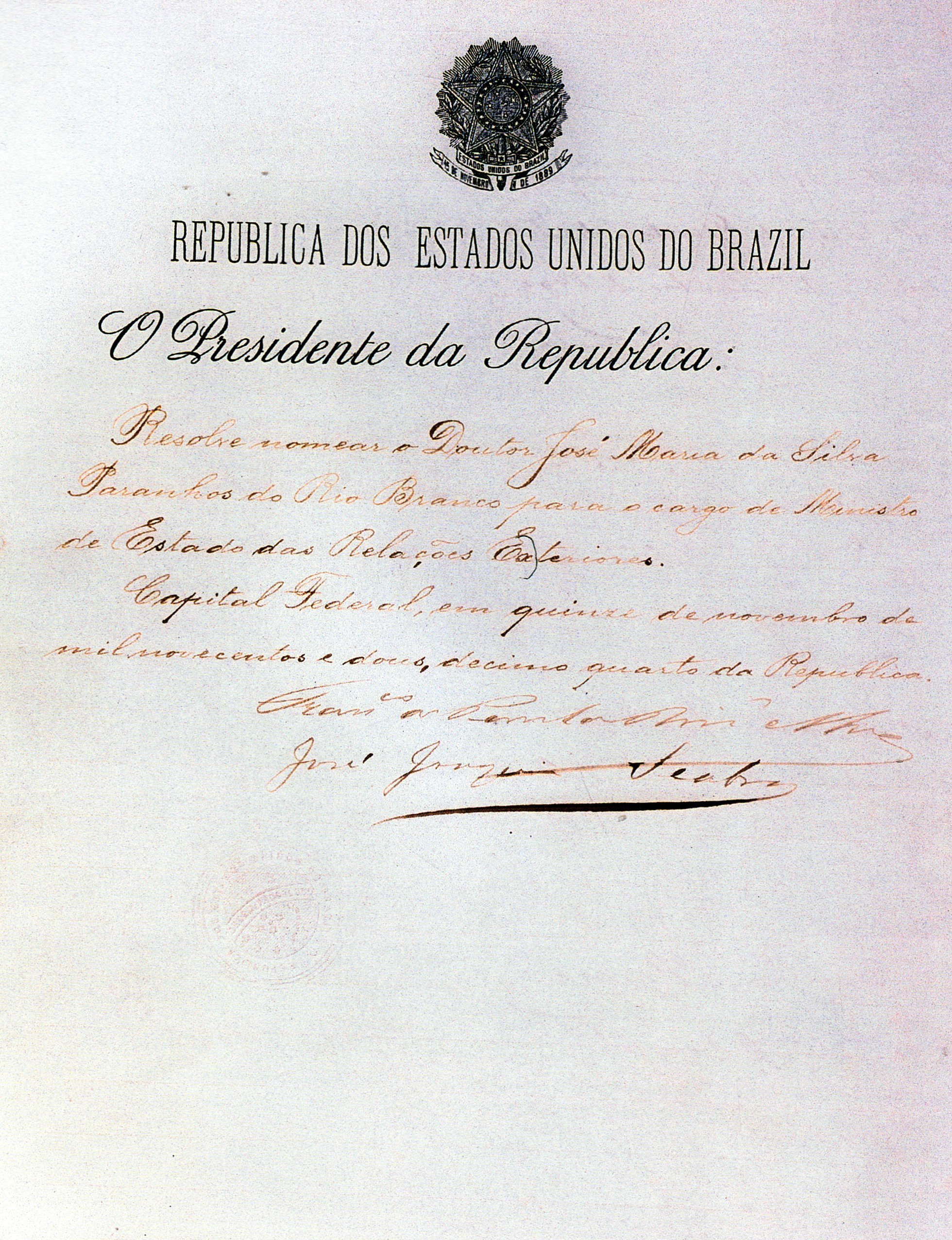
Decree of President Rodrigues Alves, naming Rio Branco to the Ministry of Foreign Affairs, in 1902.

He began his political career as a prosecutor and later was elected deputy for the Province of Mato Grosso, having served two terms (1868 to 1875). In 1871 he became editor in the newspaper A Nação, and, from 1891, wrote for Jornal do Brasil.

He became Consul General in Liverpool from 1876, was accredited minister in Germany in 1900, taking over the Ministry of Foreign Affairs from 3 December 1902 until his death in 1912. He held the position throughout the term of four presidents of the republic - the governments of Rodrigues Alves, Afonso Pena, Nilo Peçanha and Hermes da Fonseca - forming a national consensus in his time.

He received the title of Baron of Rio Branco on the eve of the end of the imperial period, but continued to use the title in his signature even after the proclamation of the republic in 1889. This was due to being a convinced monarchist and to honor his late father, the senator and diplomat José Maria da Silva Paranhos, Viscount of Rio Branco.

=== Nobleman ===
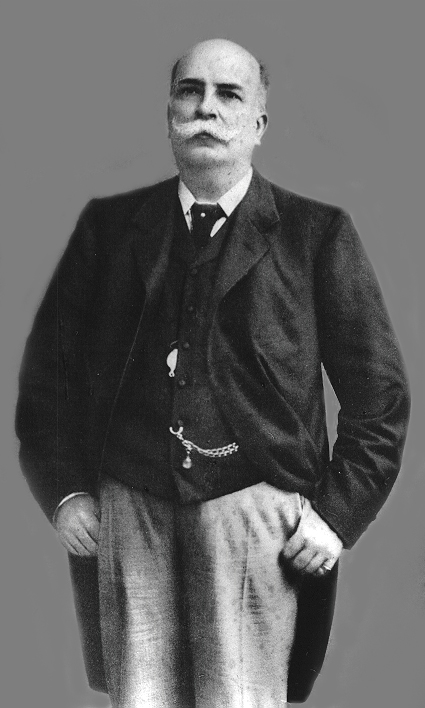
The Baron of Rio Branco in 1875.

In 1889, Emperor Pedro II of Brazil ennobled him as the Baron of Rio Branco (Barão do Rio Branco), a few days before the proclamation of the republic. Rio Branco continued to use the title throughout his life, despite governmental prohibition, because of his monarchist beliefs and in respect for his father. Being a monarchist, however, was no impediment for his success as a diplomat: the Baron of Rio Branco reached the heights of his career during the Republic, when he acted as Minister of Foreign Affairs for 10 years and settled all of Brazil's remaining border disputes by peaceful means.

=== Last years ===
Suffering from kidney problems, he offered his resignation, which was refused by President Hermes da Fonseca. In his last moments of life, he lamented the bombing of the capital of Bahia, Salvador, motivated by a political crisis and which occurred on 10 January 1912.

His death, during the carnival of 1912, altered the calendar of the popular feast that year due to official mourning and great tributes in his honor in the city of Rio de Janeiro. He was buried along his father, in the Caju Cemetery in Rio de Janeiro.

Rio Branco is considered the patron of Brazilian diplomacy.

== Career history and legacy ==
Rio Branco began his political career as a deputy in the Chamber of Deputies. From 1876 on, he was the Brazilian Consul General in Liverpool, England. He was also the Brazilian Ambassador in Berlin in the beginning of the 20th century.

Rio Branco's most important legacy to Brazil was his successful effort, as Minister of Foreign Affairs, in defining the country's borders with all of its neighbours. He was appointed Minister of Foreign Affairs in 1902 and retained office until 1912, under four different Presidents, a feat unequalled in Brazilian history.

Before and during his term, he negotiated territorial disputes between Brazil and some of its neighbours and consolidated the borders of modern Brazil. He is considered one of the most prominent Brazilian statesmen ever, as his proverbial work capacity, knowledge and skills were essential for the successful outcome of difficult boundary disputes, some of which submitted to international arbitration – such as with Argentina and France –, as well as for incorporating new territory (the state of Acre, originally Bolivian).

As a mediator he negotiated and settled disputes between the United States and many European countries. On those occasions, he never abandoned his belief in diplomacy as the means to handle international matters, thus helping establish Brazil's reputation as a peace-loving nation.

== Resolved boundary disputes ==
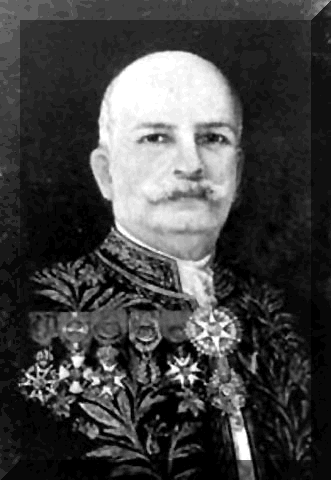
Picture of Rio Branco in the 1890s

=== Border question with France ===
Rio Branco obtained a victory over France on the border of Amapá with French Guiana, cause won by Brazil in 1900 in an arbitration of the Swiss government. The border was defined along the Oiapoque River.

=== Treaty of Petrópolis with Bolivia ===
In 1903 Rio Branco signed the Treaty of Petrópolis with Bolivia, putting an end to the dispute involving the present Brazilian state of Acre. The region was settled mostly by native Brazilians, but the Bolivian government had come close to leasing this rubber-rich area to American private entrepreneurs. Today, the state's capital bears the name Rio Branco in his honor.

=== Tobar-Rio Branco Treaty with Ecuador ===
The representative of Brazil, Don José Maria da Silva Paranhos, who was Baron of Rio Branco met the representative of Ecuador, Dr. Carlos R. Tobar, in the Brazilian city of Rio de Janeiro, to peacefully discuss a final border between their countries. On May 6, 1904, an agreement was reached and the two representatives signed the Tobar-Rio Branco Treaty, in which Ecuador renounced its claims to the disputed area between the Caquetá River and the Amazon River in favour of Brazil, in return Brazil recognized Ecuador as its neighbour. The border would be a straight line that starts midpoint between the cities of Tabatinga, Brazil and Leticia, Colombia, on the Amazon River and runs north until it reaches the Caquetá River, also known as the Japurá River.

=== Other success ===
Rio Branco has negotiated with Uruguay the condominium on the Rio Jaguarão and Lagoon Mirim, essentially a voluntary concession from Brazil to a neighbor who needed those channels. For this reason, he was honored by the government of Uruguay, and his name was given to the old Pueblo Artigas, now the city of Río Branco, in the department of Cerro Largo, near the Brazilian Jaguarão.

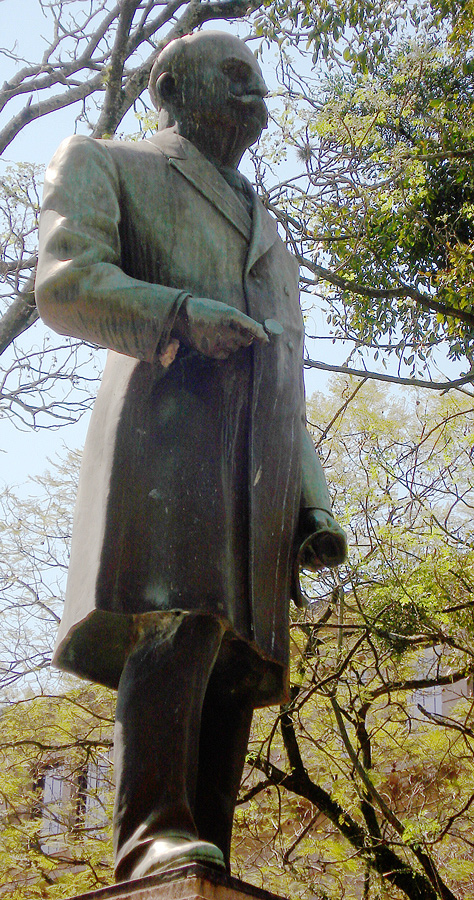
Statue of Rio Branco in Porto Alegre.

The municipality of Paranhos, in Mato Grosso do Sul, located on the border with Paraguay was baptized in his honor. In 1908, then in Rio de Janeiro, he invited the engineer Augusto Ferreira Ramos to design a cable car system that would facilitate access to the summit of Morro da Urca, known worldwide as the Sugar Loaf. In 1909, his name was suggested for the presidential succession of the following year. Rio Branco preferred to decline any candidacy that was not of national unanimity.

He was president of the Brazilian Historic and Geographic Institute (1907–1912) and wrote two books.

His son, Paulo do Rio Branco, was a prominent French-born Brazilian rugby player.

== Popularity ==
In 1909, Rio Branco was encouraged to run for the Presidency, but he declined, as he could not envisage consensus around his name. He was very popular, however, among the people at the time of his death, to the point of paralysing Carnival – an unparalleled feat in Brazilian history – on the day he died (February 10), when official mourning was declared. The first recorded instance of an official moment of silence dedicated to a person's death took place in Portugal on February 13, 1912. The Portuguese Senate dedicated 10 minutes of silence to the baron. This moment of silence was registered in the Senate's records of that day.

He wrote many books dealing mostly with the history of Brazil, and was awarded prizes and occupied the 34th chair of the Brazilian Academy of Letters.

Brazil's diplomacy academy (Instituto Rio Branco) is named after the Baron. Rio Branco is portrayed on the fifty centavos coin of the Brazilian real currency.

== Honours ==
Coat of arms of the Baron of Rio Branco

- Empire of Brazil:
  - Knight of the Order of the Southern Cross
  - Knight of the Order of the Rose
- Russian Empire:
  - Knight of the Order of Saint Stanislaus

== See also ==
- Rio Branco, Acre, capital city of the Brazilian state of Acre, named after the diplomat.
- Río Branco, Uruguay, a city named after the Brazilian diplomat.
- Paranhos, Mato Grosso do Sul, a border city also named after the Brazilian diplomat.
- Order of Rio Branco, an honorific order also named after him.

Academic offices
| Preceded by João Manuel Pereira da Silva (founder) | Brazilian Academy of Letters - Occupant of the 34th chair 1898 — 1912 | Succeeded by Lauro Müller |
Titles of nobility of the Brazilian Empire
| Preceded by New creation | Baron of Rio Branco; 1889 | Succeeded by None (title abolished) |
