= Treaty of Petrópolis =

1903 treaty between Bolivia and Brazil

Treaty of Petrópolis Tratado de Petrópolis
Treaty of Exchange of Territories and other Compensations Tratado de permuta de Territórios e outras Compensações
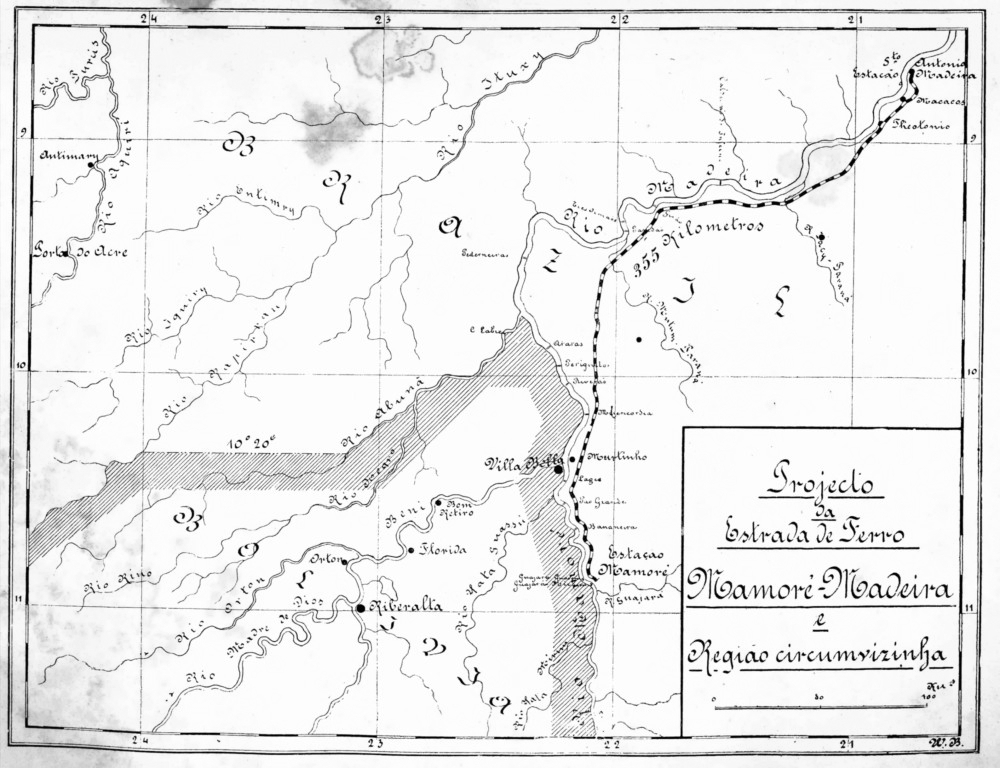
- Madeira-Mamoré Railroad route enabled by the Treaty of Petrópolis
- Type: Territory exchange
- Drafted: July 1903
- Signed: 17 November 1903
- Location: Petrópolis, Rio de Janeiro, Brazil
- Sealed: 18 February 1904
- Effective: 10 March 1904
- Signatories: José Paranhos; Assis Brasil; Fernando Eloy Guachalla; Claudio Pinilla
- Parties: Brazil; Bolivia
- Language: Portuguese

Full text
- pt:Tratado de Petrópolis at Wikisource

The Treaty of Petrópolis, signed on November 17, 1903, in the Brazilian city of Petrópolis, ended the Acre War between Bolivia and Brazil over the then-Bolivian territory of Acre (today the Acre state), a desirable territory in Bolivia-Brazil border during the contemporary rubber boom.

The treaty, drafted by Brazilian foreign affairs minister José Maria da Silva Paranhos, gave Brazil the territory of Acre (191,000 km^{2}), in exchange for over 3,000 km^{2} of Brazilian territory between the Abuna River and Madeira River, a monetary payment of two million British pounds, paid in two installments, and a pledge of a rail-link between the Bolivian city of Riberalta and the Brazilian city of Porto Velho, which would bypass the rapids on the Madeira.

The rail line was called the Madeira-Mamoré Railway. It was supposed to go as far as Riberalta, on the Rio Beni, above that river's rapids, but had to stop short at Guajará-Mirim. This was the third such attempt. In the 1870s, during the rubber boom, the American George Church was defeated twice by the heat, the difficulty of the terrain, and the appalling loss of life from fever. Another American, Percival Farquhar, won the contract for the Madeira-Mamoré railway required by the treaty. Construction began in August 1907 and was completed on July 15, 1912. The project cost US$33 million. At least 3,600 men died building the 367 km of track Guajaramirin-Station (popular estimates say that each one hundred sleepers cost one human life). The Madeira-Mamoré railway had about a year of full operation before the combination of the collapse of rubber prices, the opening of a railway from Bolivia to the Pacific via Chile, and the Panama Canal rendered it uneconomical. It was kept in operation until 1972.

The BR-364 road eventually subsumed the route as railway bridges were taken over, leaving what remained of the track to enthusiasts to salvage what they could.

== Bibliography ==
- Freitas Dutra, Eliana Regina (2005). Rebeldes literários da república: história e identidade nacional no Almanaque brasileiro Garnier (1903-1914) (in Portuguese). Belo Horizonte, Minas Gerais: Editora UFMG. ISBN 8570414811.
- Guerra, Antônio Teixeira (1955). Estudo geográfico do território do Acre (in Portuguese). Rio Branco, Acre: Serviço Gráfico do Instituto Brasileiro de Geografia e Estatística. p. 294.
