= 2nd Rhode Island Infantry Regiment =

Civil War fighting unit

- Active: June 1, 1861- July 13, 1865
- Allegiance: Union
- Size: 1,560
- Engagements: First Battle of Bull Run; Battle of Williamsburg; Battle of Seven Pines; Battle of White Oak Swamp; Battle of Malvern Hill; Battle of Fredericksburg; Battle of Salem Church; Battle of Gettysburg; Battle of the Wilderness; Battle of Spotsylvania Court House; Battle of Cold Harbor; Battle of Fort Stevens; Third Battle of Winchester; Siege of Petersburg; Battle of Hatcher's Run; Appomattox Campaign; Third Battle of Petersburg

Commanders
- Commanding Officers: John Slocum; Frank Wheaton; Nelson Vial; Horatio Rogers; Samuel B. M. Read; Elisha Hunt Rhodes

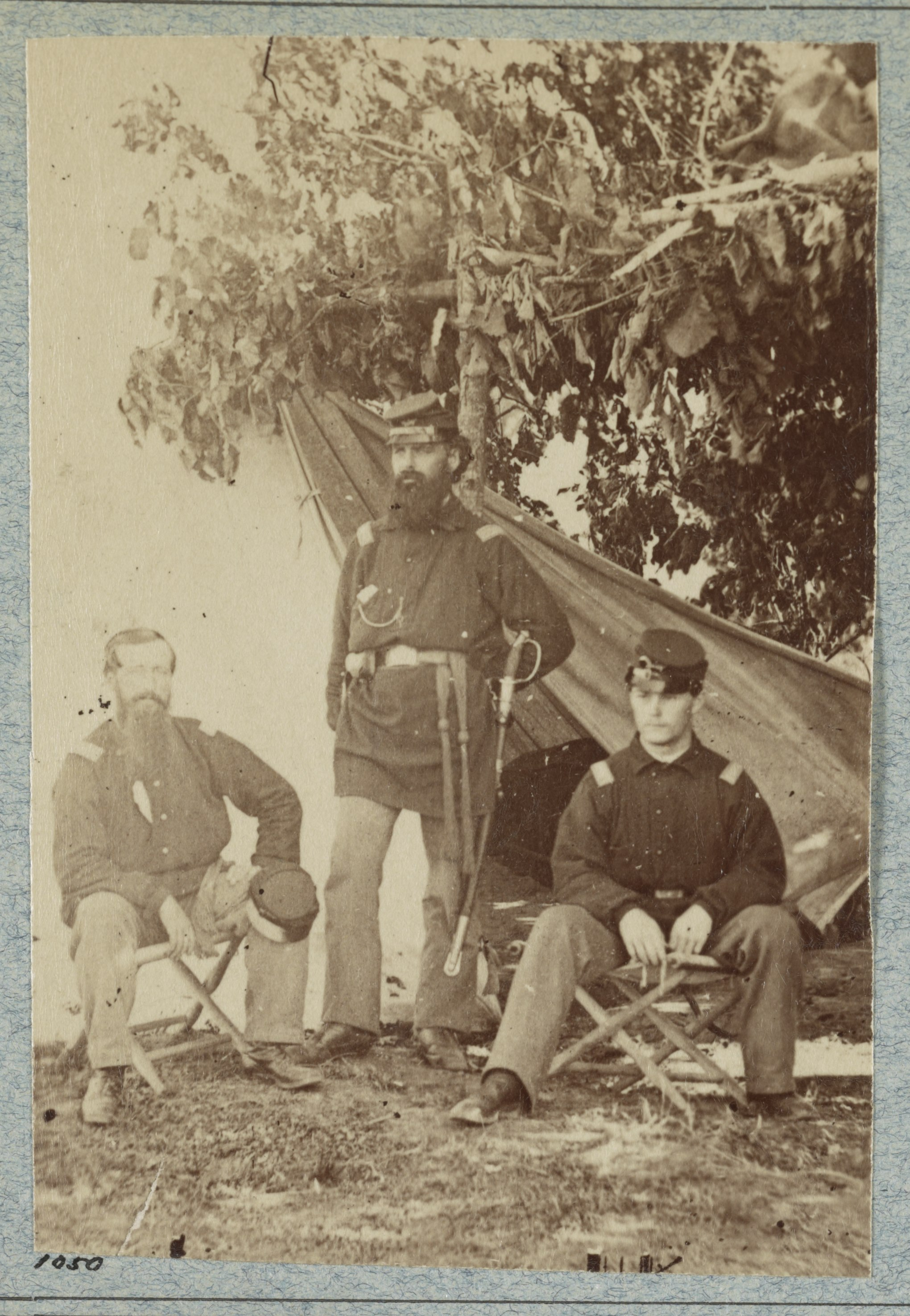
2nd R.I. Infantry soldiers

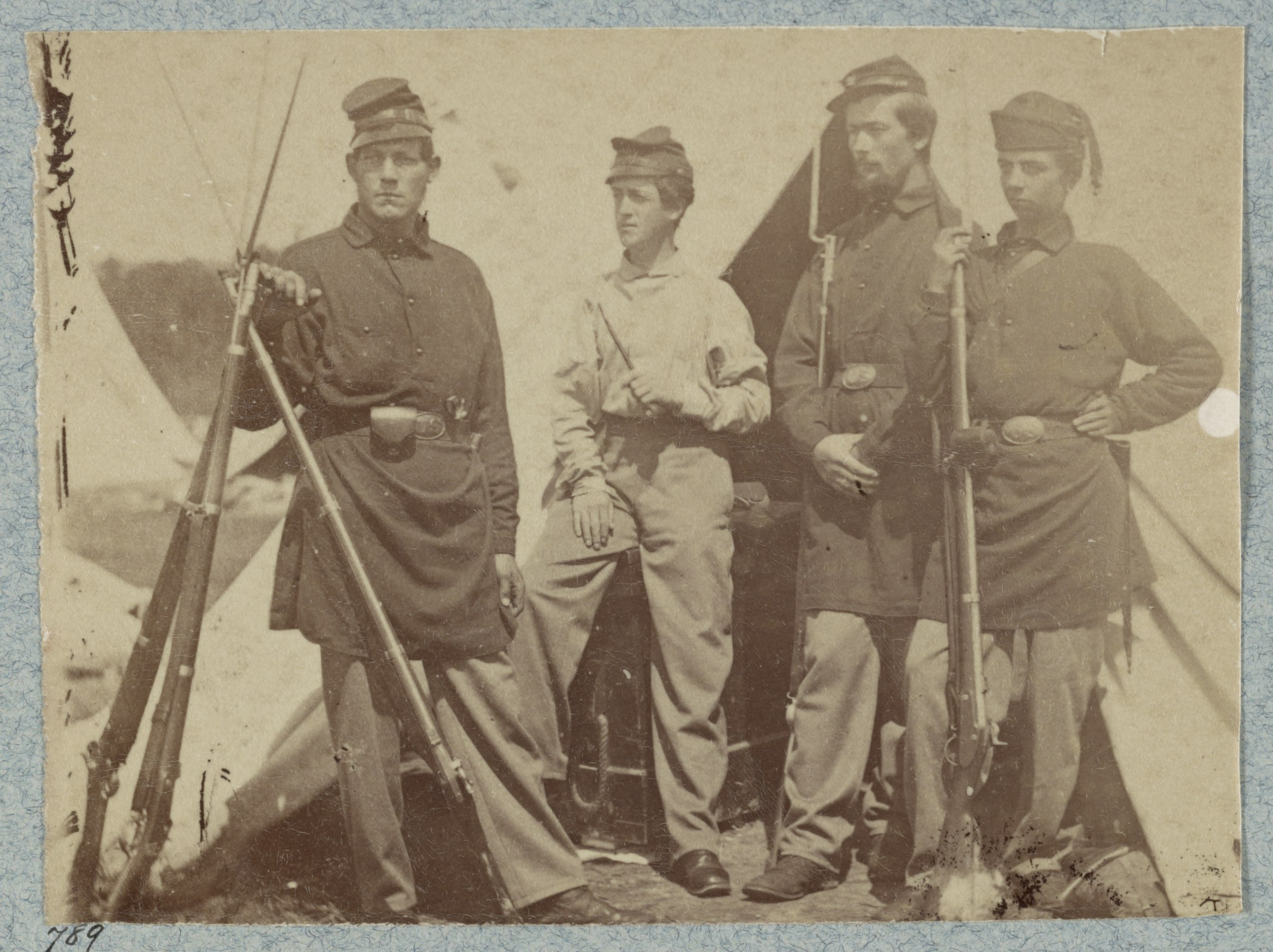
Group of 2nd R.I. Infantry

The 2nd Rhode Island Infantry Regiment was an infantry regiment composed of volunteers from the state of Rhode Island that served with the Union Army in the American Civil War. They, along with the 1st Rhode Island, wore a very simple uniform. The uniform composed of a dark blue jacket like shirt, tannish grey pants, and a dark blue chasseur kepi. The 2nd Rhode Island also wore havelocks in the beginning of the war, but after finding them useless they discarded them.

== Overview ==
The 2nd Rhode Island Infantry Regiment was organized in June 1861 in Providence. The regiment was initially assigned to the IV Corps of the Army of Northeastern Virginia (later became the Army of the Potomac) and saw its first combat action at the First Battle of Bull Run. The IV Corps later became the VI Corps of the Army of the Shenandoah, and the 2nd Rhode Island participated in several fights in the Shenandoah Valley. The regiment was mustered out of service at Providence on July 13, 1865.

== History ==
The Second was Rhode Island's fighting regiment. It fired the opening volley at First Bull Run, and was in line at the final scenes of Appomattox. It arrived at Washington, June 22, 1861, and after a few weeks encampment there, marched to the field of First Bull Run. It was then in Burnside's brigade, of Hunter's division. Burnside opened that fight with the First Rhode Island deployed as skirmishers, and the Second advancing in line of battle. Its casualties in that engagement aggregated 98 in killed, wounded and missing; among the killed were Colonel Slocum, Major Sullivan Ballou, and two captains. During the Peninsular campaign it served in Palmer's (3d) Brigade, Couch's (1st) Division, Fourth Corps; this division was transferred in October, 1862, to the Sixth Corps as Newton's (3d) Division. The regiment, under Colonel Rogers, distinguished itself in the hard-fought battle of the Sixth Corps at Salem Heights, May 3, 1863, in which action it lost 7 killed, 68 wounded, and 6 missing. At the Wilderness, it lost 12 killed, 66 wounded, and 5 missing; and at Spotsylvania, 15 killed, 32 wounded, and 6 missing. In the final battle of the Sixth Corps—at Sailor's Creek, April 6, 1865—the regiment displayed remarkable fighting qualities, engaging the enemy in an action so close that men were bayoneted, and clubbed muskets were freely used. The original regiment was mustered out June 17, 1864, the recruits and reenlisted men left in the field were organized into a battalion of three companies, to which five new ones were subsequently added in the fall and winter of 1864–5.

Organized at Providence June, 1861. Left State for Washington, D. C., June 19. Attached to Burnside's brigade, Hunter's division, McDowell's Army of Northeast Virginia, to August, 1861. Couch's brigade, Division of the Potomac, to October, 1861. Couch's brigade, Buell's division, Army Potomac, to March, 1862. 1st Brigade, 1st Division, 4th Army Corps, Army Potomac, to September, 1862. 1st Brigade, 1st Division, 6th Army Corps, Army Potomac, to October, 1862. 2nd Brigade, 3rd Division, 6th Army Corps, to March, 1864. 4th Brigade, 2nd Division, 6th Army Corps, to July, 1864. 3rd Brigade, 1st Division, 6th Army Corps, Army Potomac and Army Shenandoah, Middle Military Division, to December, 1864. 3rd Brigade, 1st Division, 6th Army Corps, Army Potomac, to July, 1865.

== Detailed service ==
Under the first call of the President of the United States for additional troops to serve three years or during the war, the Second Regiment of Rhode Island Volunteers was organized. The work of enlistment was spiritedly prosecuted under an order from Governor Sprague, and Camp Burnside was established on the Dexter Training Ground, in Providence. The command of the regiment was given to Colonel Slocum, promoted from major of the First Rhode Island, an officer of great personal bravery, who had gained reputation in the Mexican War. Colonel William Goddard, of the Governor's Staff, was detailed temporarily to act as lieutenant-colonel, who on being relieved was temporarily succeeded by General Charles T. Robbins. At the request of Colonel Slocum, Colonel Christopher Blanding assisted in drilling the regiment. To add to the comfort of the men, a thousand rubber blankets were presented to them by the firm of A. & W. Sprague. Many other tokens of interest and regard were also received by officers and men, and the citizens of Lonsdale made a liberal donation to the hospital department.

A stand of colors was presented to the regiment by the ladies of Providence, through Colonel Jabez C. Knight. The colors were assigned to Company D, Captain Nelson Viall, who had served in Mexico. The regiment struck their tents at 2 o'clock, P. M., June 19, 1861, and marched to Exchange Place, where, in the presence of a large crowd of spectators, an address was delivered by Bishop Thomas M. Clark, who also invoked the Divine blessing. Resuming their march to Fox Point, they embarked on board the steamer State of Maine, and the Battery accompanying the regiment, under Captain William H. Reynolds, on board the steamer Kill von Kull.

On the morning of June 22, the regiment, accompanied by Governor Sprague, Hon. John R. Bartlett, Secretary of State, and Bishop Clark, arrived in Washington, warmly welcomed, and encamped in Gales' Woods, near Camp Sprague. On the 26th, the First and Second regiments, with their respective batteries, paid their respects to President Lincoln, by whom they were reviewed. While in camp, the regiment was brigaded with the First Rhode Island, 71st New York, 2nd New Hampshire, and the two Rhode Island batteries.

In this brigade, commanded by Colonel Burnside, they marched to the Battle of Bull Run, leading the column. On that sanguinary and disastrous field, it was the first, with Captain Reynolds' battery, to engage, and fought the enemy forty-five minutes without support, losing 28 men killed, 56 wounded, and 30 missing; among the former, Colonel Slocum, Major Sullivan Ballou, and Captains Levi A. Tower and Samuel J. Smith. The men stood up bravely under a heavy fire from the rebel batteries, but to no purpose. The color company was a conspicuous mark, and the regimental colors were completely riddled by balls. Dr. James Harris, Surgeon of the regiment, was unceasing in the performance of his professional duties through the day, often exposed to danger on the field, and always having words of cheer for the wounded and dying. After the retreat commenced, he remained at his post, and gave himself up a prisoner, rather than be separated from those who so much needed his attention. The death of the brave Colonel Slocum, left the regiment in the command of Captain Frank Wheaton, of the United States Army, then acting Lieutenant-Colonel, to the Colonelcy of which he was subsequently promoted. Captain Viall, on the fall of Major Ballou, assumed the duty of a field officer, and was afterward promoted to Major of the regiment. Captain William H. P. Steere received the commission of Lieutenant-Colonel in the same. In retiring from the field, the regiment preserved its order, and on returning to Washington established temporary quarters at Camp Clark.

It subsequently occupied Camp Sprague, and removed thence to Camp Brightwood, where it remained till March, 1862, occupied in drilling, picket service, clearing away forests, and building Fort Slocum—a worthy monument to the memory of its revered commander.

On 26 March, the regiment moved with the Army of the Potomac, to enter upon the campaign of the Peninsula. During the siege of Yorktown, it was constantly employed in picket and other important duties. On the evacuation of that place by the rebels, it formed a part of Stoneman's advance in pursuit, and participated in the capture of Fort Magruder, at Williamsburg, saving a regiment that had been badly cut up by unwisely drawing upon it the fire of the fort at eight hundred yards distance. It continued with the advance of Stoneman during its operations on the Pamunky and Chickahominy Rivers, was the first to take possession of White House, took part in the battles of Mechanicsville and Seven Pines, and at Turkey Bend was detached with the 7th Massachusetts, to guard Turkey Bend Bridge, and remained there till Porter's corps crossed. After the Battle of Malvern Hill, when the army fell back to Harrison's Landing, the regiment was assigned to the rear as a cover. On 5 July, it was in position on the west side of James River, opposite City Point, occupied in throwing up breastworks. When the Army of the Potomac withdrew from the Peninsula, the regiment proceeded to the vicinity of Yorktown, where it remained a week destroying earthworks, and August 29 it embarked for Alexandria, where it landed September 1.

It shared the fortunes of Pope's Bull Run campaign, was in position at Elk Mountain on 17 September, during the Battle of Antietam, and subsequently, after performing a variety of fatiguing duties, marched with Franklin's corps to a position in front of Fredericksburg. In the assault upon that city, December 14, it acted with spirit and efficiency. In the preliminary movements of Franklin's corps, this regiment was the first to cross the river, in face of a heavy body of rebel infantry and artillery, and deploying as skirmishers, drove in their pickets- a movement executed with the coolness and precision of a regimental drill. Here, Colonel Wheaton was ordered to the command of a brigade that had been under the command of General Howe, and the command of the regiment devolved on the gallant Colonel Nelson Viall, who received his commission on the field. This he subsequently resigned, and the temporary command of the regiment fell to Lieutenant-Colonel Goff, an able and highly esteemed officer. He was succeeded by Colonel Horatio Rogers Jr., transferred from the 11th R. I. Volunteers.

After the battle of the 14th, Colonel (now General) Wheaton received from the regiment the gift of a superb sword, belt and silver spurs, as a testimony of their regard for him as an officer. In the "mud expedition" that followed this attack on Fredericksburg, the Second Rhode Island participated. It subsequently went into winter quarters, and was employed in picket duty and the usual camp routine. On the 2nd and 3 May 1863, the Battle of Chancellorsville was fought. On the morning of the 3rd, the regiment supported General Gibbon's division in carrying Salem Heights, near Fredericksburg, having two men slightly wounded. In the storming of Marye's Heights, on the afternoon of the same day, the most terrible portion of the conflict, and in some sense a separate, independent battle, the regiment, led by Colonel Rogers, performed deeds of conspicuous valor. At a critical moment, it largely contributed towards checking the enemy when our forces were being driven on the right, and saved a New Jersey regiment, hotly pressed, from annihilation and probable capture. The battle of Gettysburg, Pennsylvania on July 1, 2 and 3, followed. In reaching this field of Union triumph, so dearly purchased, the regiment made good time, and toward night of the second day, having marched about thirty miles, it took position on the field of battle on the extreme left, as a portion of Sedgwick's reserve. During the whole of the 3rd, though not directly engaged, it was constantly moving, under a storm of shells, to different parts of the field, in support of points hardly pressed, losing one man killed and three wounded, and on the following day was on picket on the further edge of the battle field. In pursuit of the retreating rebels, the regiment had a picket skirmish at Williamsport, July 12, in which three men were wounded. Continuing its march back into Virginia, the regiment made camp near Warrenton, July 25, having marched, going and returning, nearly three hundred miles.

On 9 October, following the Battle of Gettysburg, the rebel General Lee put his army again in motion, to turn the right flank of the forces under Meade, and make a push for Washington; but the falling back of the Federals upon Centreville and Chantilly completely checkmated his purpose. At this point, the 6th Corps, including the Second Rhode Island, occupied the extreme right of the line. In the advance of the Union forces upon Rappahannock Station, November 7, which resulted in the rout of the enemy and the capture of 1600 prisoners, the regiment was held in reserve; and in another successful advance across the Rapidan, November 26, it participated. A quiet winter at Brandy Station intervened, when on 4 May 1864, the Army of the Potomac began the grand movement that ultimated in the capture of Richmond. The marching and fighting of the succeeding four or five weeks, to reach the Chickahominy, comprises a part of the history of the regiment.

In the Wilderness, at Spotsylvania Court House, and all along the succession of flank movements, it bore an honorable and conspicuous part, and in the sanguinary Battle of Cold Harbor, a few days before its term of service expired, added another to the laurels won on other fields. On 11 June, the three-years' men, under the command of Colonel S. B. M. Bead, returned to Providence, and on the 17th were mustered out of service. By order of Governor Smith, they were received by the Division of Militia under the command of Major General Olney Arnold, and escorted to Howard Hall, where a bountiful collation had been provided, and a formal State reception took place. Colonel Read was wounded in the head and leg, May 12, on the third day of the battle of Spotsylvania Court House, and was promoted from Lieutenant-Colonel on 1 June following, for gallant conduct in the battles of the campaign in which he had participated up to that date.

At the date of the mustering out of the first three-years' men, Companies A, B and C, comprising recruits enlisted from time to time, conscripts and re-enlisted veterans, remained in the field before Petersburg. Wishing to preserve to the close of the war the identity of a regiment that had served so faithfully and bravely, Governor Smith authorized a reorganization, dating from the muster out of the original Regiment. Companies D, E, F, G and H, were recruited and sent forward, and regimental relations were once more established, under the command of Lieutenant-Colonel Elisha H. Rhodes, brevetted Colonel April 2, 1865, for gallant services before Petersburg.

On 6 July 1864, General Early, with a portion of the rebel advance, crossed the Potomac, near Antietam, into Maryland, and made a raid on Washington. The Sixth Army Corps, including the Second Rhode Island, and Batteries C, D and G, were hurried to the defense of the Capital, and reached there just in season to save the city, and to aid in driving the enemy, who had approached within shelling distance, back into the valley of the Shenandoah. The pursuit of the rebels was continued, first under General Wright, and then under General Sheridan, who had been appointed to the command of the department. In the Battle of Winchester, September 19, the regiment behaved with great gallantry, and had nine men wounded, one mortally.

After this battle the regiment was detailed as part of the garrison of Winchester, to protect it against guerrillas, as well as to escort trains to the front. It was there when the Battle of Cedar Creek, October 19, was fought, and remained until December 1, when it rejoined the Army of the Potomac, and passed the winter of 1864 and 1865 in doing siege duty in the trenches in front of Petersburg, Va. The regiment was engaged in all the skirmishes that took place during this period, the most important of which were Hatcher's Run, December 10, 1864; Hatcher's Run, February 5th, 6th, 7th and 8th, 1865; Fort Fisher, Va., March 25, and Fort Stedman, same day. In the attack on Petersburg, April 2, 1865, the regiment took a prominent and important part. The night before, the 6th Corps was massed in front of Fort Fisher, ready for the assault. Just at daybreak, Sunday morning, the lines advanced under a heavy fire, and carried the enemy's main lines by storm. The Second Rhode Island started in the second line, but were the first to reach the works, and planted its colors on the parapet. The enemy fled in great confusion, after their lines were pierced. Lieutenant Frank S. Halliday, acting Adjutant of the regiment, with a small party, carried a rebel fort mounting two guns, and turned them upon the enemy. The whole affair was a glorious success, and caused the evacuation of the city on Monday morning, April 3. In the Battle of Sailors' Creek, Thursday following the above, April 6, the regiment displayed great prowess. Around 5 P.M., the division to which it was attached, advanced on the enemy's lines, and the Second Rhode Island attacked a part of the Naval Brigade, commanded by officers of the late rebel fleet. The regiment charged to within a few feet of their lines, when it met a severe flank fire, which forced it to retire. The action as so close that men were bayoneted, and knocked down with the butts of muskets. In the confusion, the colors of the regiment were captured, but were quickly retaken. The place where it charged was swampy, with water at least three feet deep, but the men pushed gallantly forward, and regained all the ground lost, causing the enemy to flee in great confusion, who left a part of their wagons in Federal hands. The loss was severe in officers and men, but there was a proud satisfaction in knowing that the efforts of the regiment hastened the surrender of Lee and his army. Captain Charles W. Gleason and Lieutenant William H. Perry, both gallant officers, were killed. They were loved and respected by the regiment. They entered the service as enlisted men at the beginning of the war, and by merit rose to their positions as officers. In this battle the conduct of officers and men was in the highest degree commendable. The new men, who went into action for the first time, fought-like veterans.

After the fall of Richmond, and the surrender of the rebel Northern Army, under Lee, the regiment left that city for Washington, D. C., May 24, was mustered out of the United States service at Hall's Hill, Va., July 13, and left for Providence on the 15th. It reached its destination by the train from New York at midnight, July 17, accompanied by the 11th and 58th Massachusetts regiments, bound to Readville. The regiment was received with the cheers of waiting friends, the salute of the Marine Artillery, and the presented arms of Company A, Pawtucket Light Guard, Captain M'Cloy. After the reception, they formed and were escorted to Washington Hall, where they partook of an ample collation, prepared by L. H. Humphreys, under the direction of Captain Henrie Crandall.

The regiment had often been severely depleted by sickness, and by losses upon the battlefield. After the Battle of Malvern Hill in 1862, it could number only 250 effective men. It numbered on its return, 345 officers and men. Under general orders from the War Department, General Meade directed, March 7, 1865, the names of the following battles in which the regiment had borne a meritorious part, to be inscribed upon its colors, viz:

First Bull Run Salem Heights, Petersburg, Yorktown, Gettysburg, Fort Stevens, Williamsburg, Rappahannock Station, Opequan, Malvern Hill, Wilderness, Hatcher's Run, Antietam, Spottsylvania, Sailors' Creek, Fredericksburg, Cold Harbor, Appomattox, Marye's Heights.

== Losses ==
- Killed & Mortally Wounded: 9 Officers & 111 Men
- Died of Disease: 2 Officers & 74 Men
- Total: 196

== Commanding officers ==
(The ranks indicated are the highest attained.)

- Colonel John S. Slocum – June 5, 1861, to July 21, 1861 (killed in action)
- Major General Frank Wheaton – July 21, 1861, to November 29, 1862 (promoted to brigadier general)
- Brevet Brigadier General Nelson Viall – December 13, 1862, to January 25, 1863 (resigned)
- Brevet Brigadier General Horatio Rogers Jr. – February 6, 1863, to January 14, 1864 (resigned)
- Colonel Samuel B.M. Read – January 15, 1864, to June 17, 1864 (mustered out of service)
- Brevet Colonel Elisha Hunt Rhodes – June 17, 1864, to July 13, 1865 (mustered out of service)

== Notable 2nd Rhode Island members ==
- Sergeant William J. Babcock – Medal of Honor recipient
- Major Sullivan Ballou – killed at the Battle of Bull Run and author of famous letter
- Brevet Brigadier General Nathan Goff Jr. – Commander of 37th U.S. Colored Troops
- Corporal Thomas Parker – Medal of Honor recipient
- Captain William Greene Turner – sculptor
- Major Henry H. Young – chief scout for General Sheridan
