= Horatio R. Rogers =

American lawyer

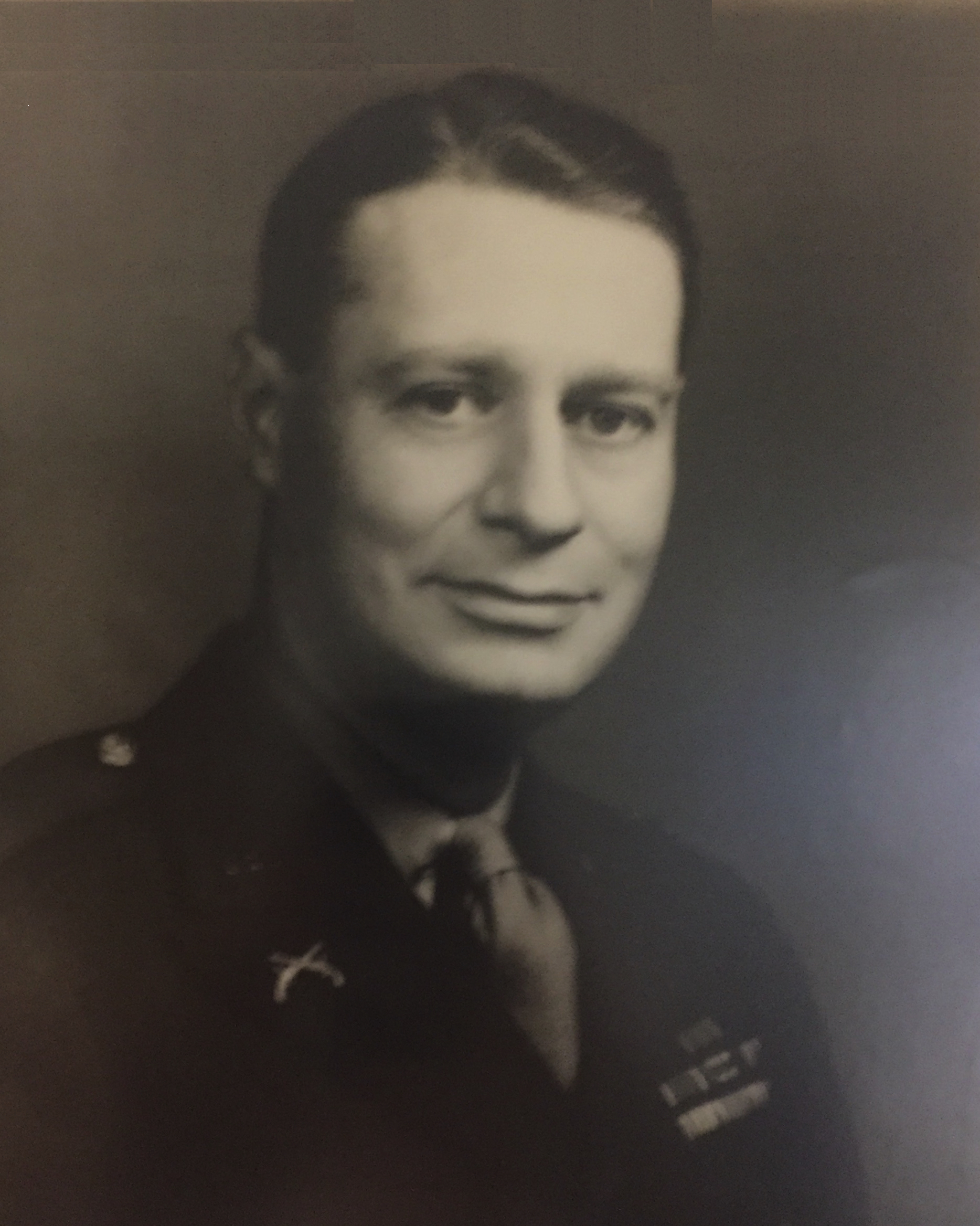

7th Dean of the American University Washington College of Law
- In office 1947–1951
- Preceded by: Helen Arthur Adair
- Succeeded by: David Bookstaver

Personal details
- Born: Horatio Rodman Rogers; December 12, 1900 Newport, Rhode Island, U.S.
- Died: October 24, 1958 (aged 57) Bethesda, Maryland, U.S.
- Spouse(s): Mary Courtney Mackenzie (m. 1924–1938) Helen Louise Pohlman (m. 1944)
- Education: University of Chicago (AB); Harvard University (LLB)

Military service
- Allegiance: United States
- Branch/service: United States Army
- Years of service: 1917–1919; 1942–1946
- Rank: Colonel
- Battles/wars: World War I World War II
- Awards: Distinguished Service Cross; Legion of Merit; Purple Heart

Horatio Rodman Rogers (December 12, 1900 – October 24, 1958) was an American attorney, soldier, and academic. While serving in an armored unit under George S. Patton in World War I, he received the Distinguished Service Cross for gallantry. Later, he attended the Harvard Law School and rejoined the Army in World War II as executive to the Provost Marshal General. In 1947, he was appointed the first male dean of the Washington College of Law in Washington, D.C. and oversaw its incorporation by American University in 1949.

== Early life and education ==
Rogers was born in Newport, Rhode Island to a prominent family, the son of Cornelia (Arnold) and Reverend Arthur Rogers, an Episcopal priest. His paternal grandfather, prominent jurist Horatio Rogers Jr., was elected state attorney general twice and served at the time on the Rhode Island Supreme Court. His maternal grandfather, lawyer and historian Samuel Greene Arnold, was a former United States Senator. He and his brothers grew up in Evanston, Illinois.

== World War I service ==
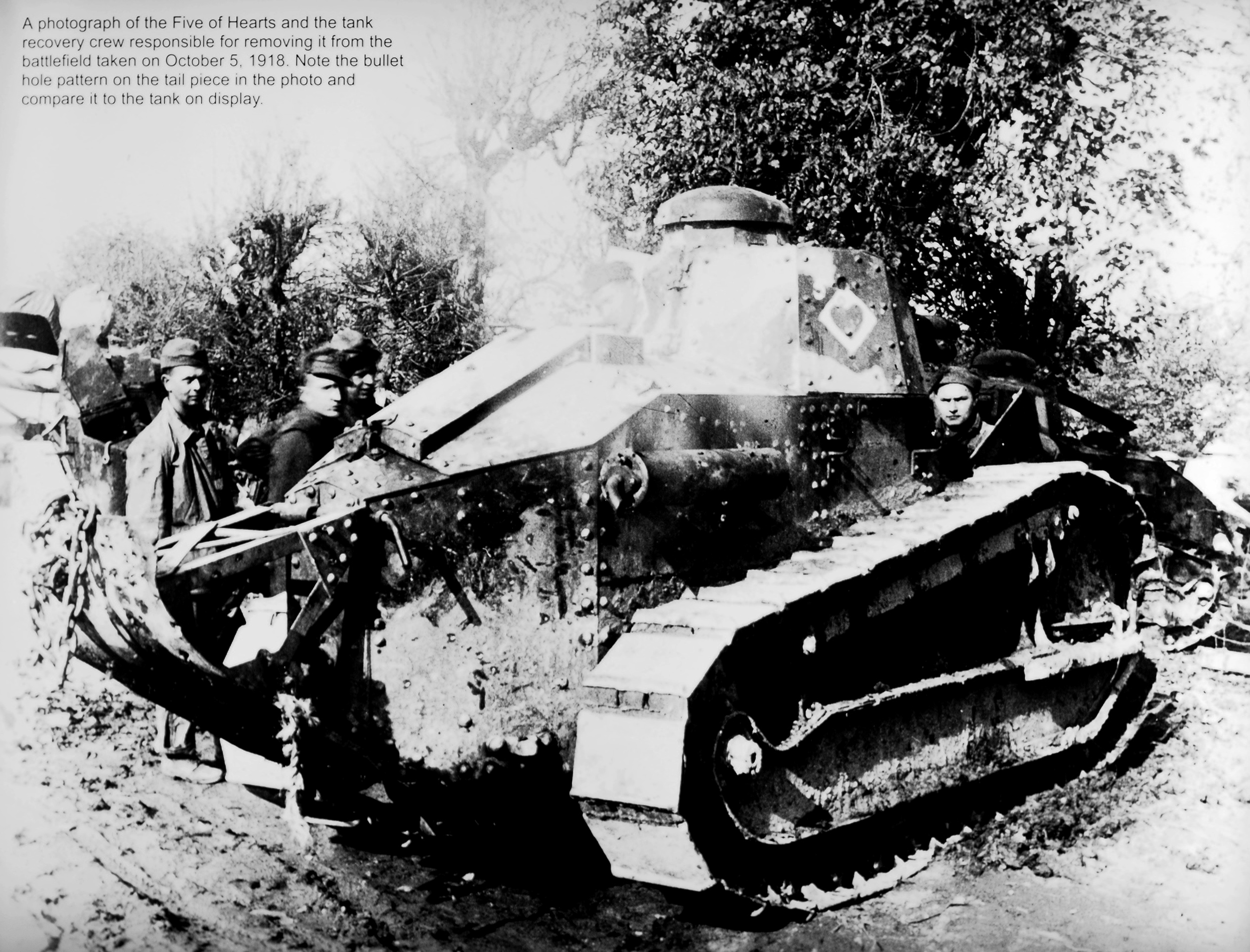
Tank recovery crew removing Five of Hearts from the battlefield near Exermont on October 5, 1918...

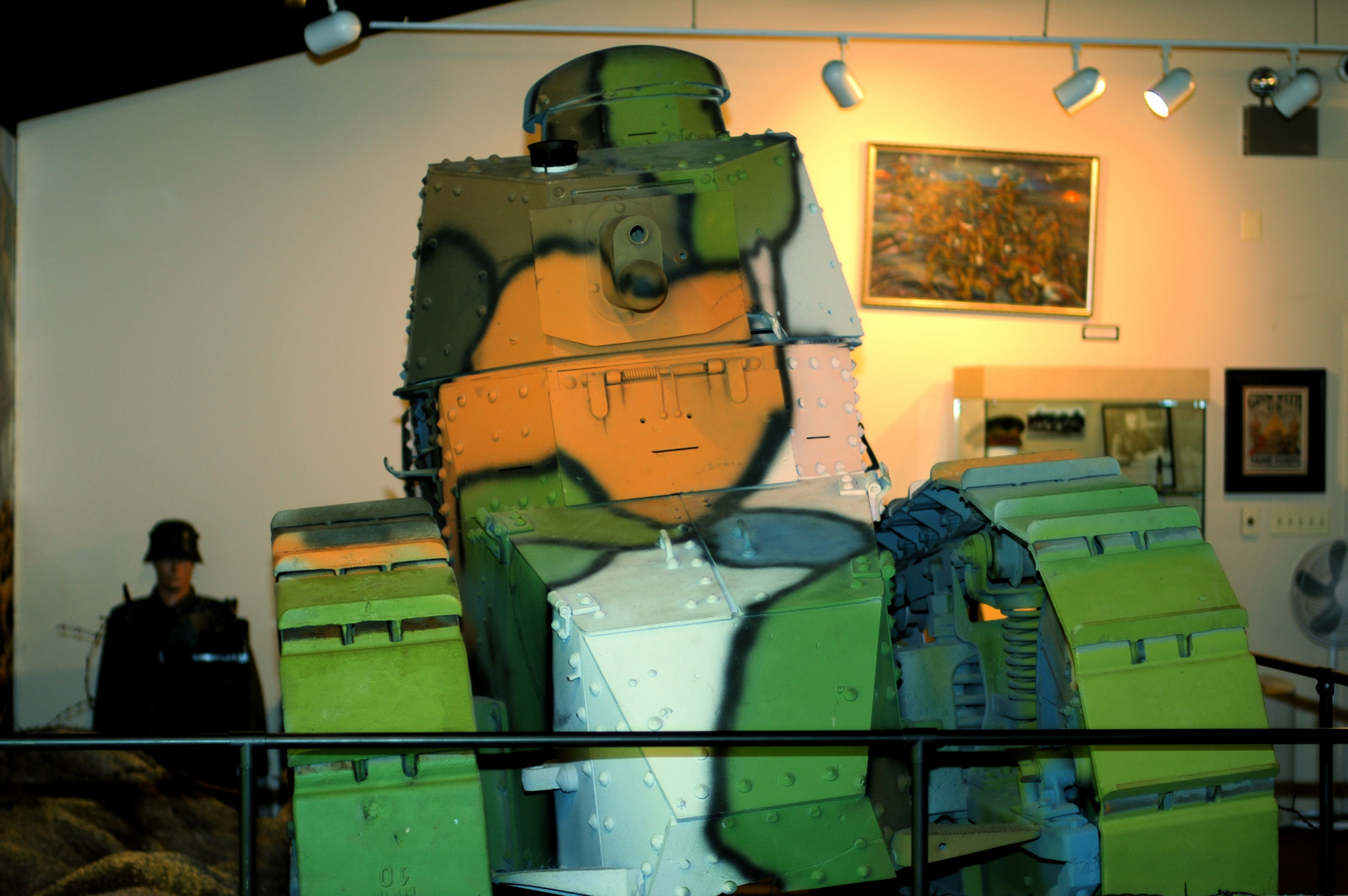
...and Five of Hearts on display at the Fort George G. Meade Museum on May 19, 2006

=== Distinguished Service Cross citation ===
The President of the United States of America, authorized by Act of Congress, July 9, 1918, takes pleasure in presenting the Distinguished Service Cross to Private Horatio R. Rogers (ASN: 291666), United States Army, for extraordinary heroism in action while serving with Company C, 344th Tank Battalion, Tank Corps, A.E.F., near Exermont, France, 4 October 1918. Acting as a runner, Private Rogers, upon learning that there was a scarcity of tank drivers, begged permission to drive a tank. Permission being granted, he drove his tank well in advance of the Infantry until the officer in command of his tank became wounded by enemy fire. Private Rogers left the shelter of his tank and crawled to other tanks of his company, carrying messages from his wounded officer. This duty was performed in the face of heavy artillery, machine-gun, and rifle fire, and was carried on until Private Rogers was severely wounded. The coolness, devotion to duty, and fearlessness displayed inspired the men of his company to still greater endeavor.

== Legal career ==
After his Army service, Rogers attended the University of Chicago and Harvard Law School; he practiced law for a short time before joining the faculty of the University of South Dakota College of Law.

Following American entry into World War II, Rogers rejoined the Army and was commissioned as a captain in the office of the Provost Marshal General. Still suffering from the effects of his battle injuries, he received a letter of recommendation from General Patton. He served through the end of the war, reaching the rank of colonel.

In 1947, Rogers was appointed the first male dean of the Washington College of Law. This coincided with the school's admittance into the Association of American Law Schools and its desire to raise its national status. During Rogers' tenure, the law school also became a part of the American University.

== Later life and death ==
Rogers resigned as dean in 1951 in order to accept an appointment as Director of Economic Defense Staff at the Economic Cooperation Administration. He later served in the general counsel's office of the Export–Import Bank of the United States before dying from complications of lung cancer and heart disease on October 24, 1958. He was buried in Arlington National Cemetery.
