= Coronel Church =

Brazilian steam locomotive

Madeira-Mamoré No. 12
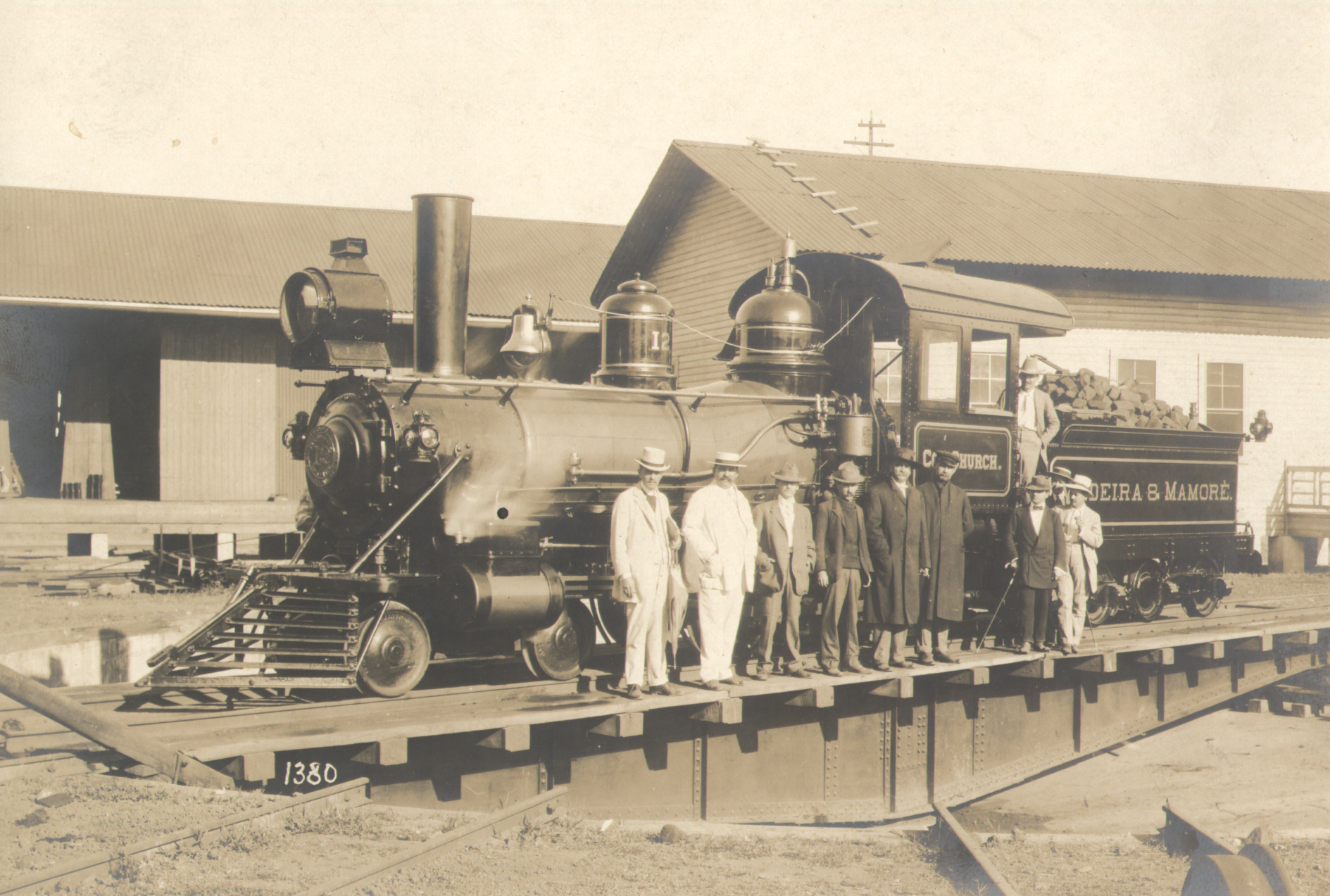
Type and origin
- Power type: Steam
- Builder: Baldwin Locomotive Works
- Build date: 1877
Specifications
- Configuration
  - Whyte: 4-4-0
- Gauge: 1,000 mm (3 ft 3 3/8 in) metre gauge
- Fuel type: Oil
Career
- Operators: Madeira-Mamoré Railroad
- Numbers: 12
- Disposition: Static Display

Coronel Church, or Madeira-Mamoré No. 12, is a historic 4-4-0 steam locomotive of the Madeira-Mamoré Railroad, said to be the first locomotive in the Amazon. It is currently on static display in Porto Velho, Brazil.

Named after Madeira-Mamoré engineer George Earl Church, the locomotive helped inaugurate the first part of the line on July 4, 1878. However, in August 1879, it derailed on a poorly-designed curve. With construction on the railroad halted due to tropical disease, Coronel Church was abandoned to the rainforest. It would be was rediscovered 34 years later by surveyors acting on behalf of Percival Farquhar, who had secured a government concession to reopen the line. Some accounts say the locomotive was overgrown with vegetation, while others say it was used as a water tank, hen house, and bakery oven by local villagers. Regardless, it was salvaged by railroad engineers and returned to service in 1912.

The story of Coronel Church was the inspiration for Duke the Lost Engine, the 25th book of the Rev. W. Awdry's Railway Series. Duke, based on the Ffestiniog Railway's Prince, is also abandoned after his railway is closed, only to be rediscovered decades later.
