= George Earl Church =

American civil engineer and geographer

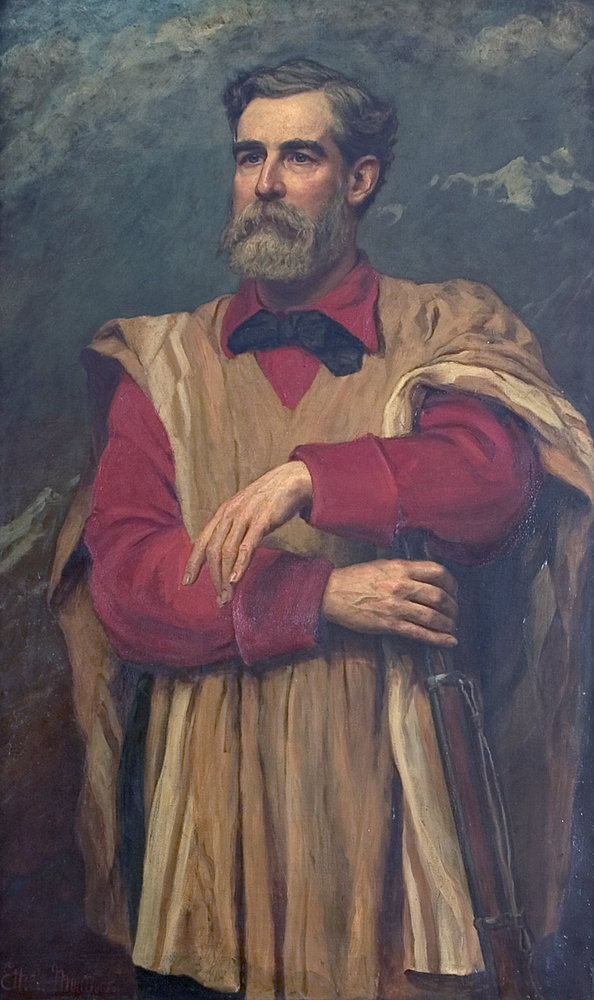
George Earl Church, painted in 1885

Colonel George Earl Church (December 7, 1835 – January 4, 1910), was an American civil engineer and geographer, known for being an explorer of South America.

== Early life ==
Born in New Bedford, Massachusetts, his father was Richard Church, a direct descendant of Benjamin Church, while his mother's side was traced to a daughter of Edward Winslow, a passenger on board the Mayflower. After the death of his father, aged 7 he and his mother moved to Providence, Rhode Island, where he was schooled for seven years as a civil engineer.

== Early career ==
On qualification, Church undertook various civil projects, including the Hoosac Tunnel and construction of the Boston & Maine Railroad. In 1857, he was appointed Chief Engineer for the Argentine Great Northern Railway, based in Buenos Aires, surveying a route for the government of Argentina. After delays occurred due to financial restrictions, Church joined a seven-month exploration of southern Argentina that covered 7,000 miles (11,000 km). On his return, he joined the engineering team of the Argentine Great Northern Railway.

== American Civil War ==
At the outbreak of the American Civil War, he returned to join the Army of the Potomac in the 7th Rhode Island Infantry. He enlisted as a captain in Company C on July 26, 1862. He became acting lieutenant colonel of the 7th Rhode Island in December 1862, fighting at the Battle of Fredericksburg and transferred to the 11th Rhode Island Infantry in January 1863.

He served as colonel and commanding officer of the 11th Rhode Island Infantry from February 11 until July 13, 1863, commanding the regiment at the Siege of Suffolk.

After his military service, he was appointed chief engineer for the Fall River railway extension of Providence, Warren, and Bristol Railway.

== Exploration of South America ==
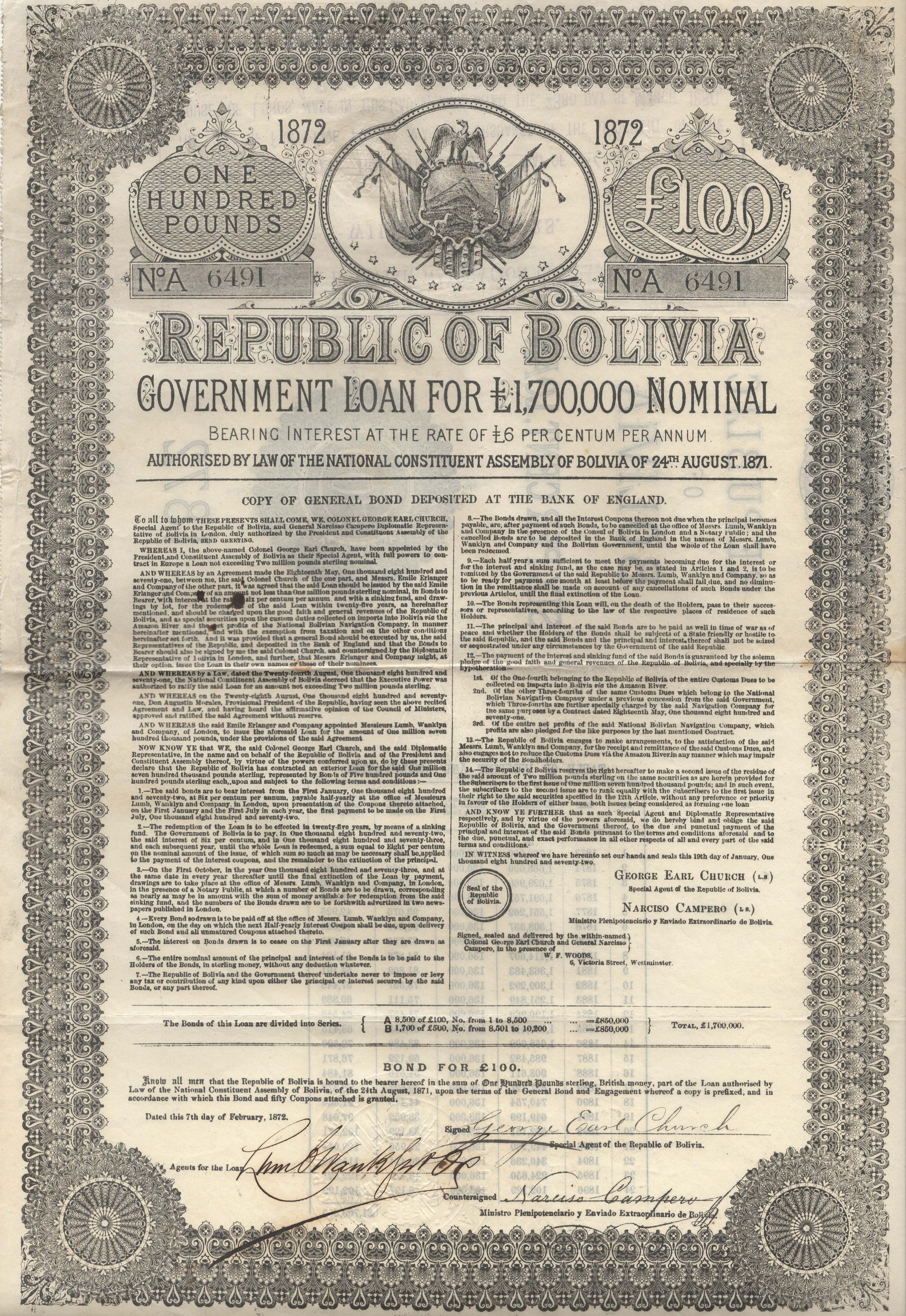
Government Loan of the Republic of Bolivia, issued 24 August 1871, signed by George Earl Church as 'Special Agent of the Republic of Bolivia'.

Having written on issues associated with Mexico, the United States Government had Church appointed as war correspondent of the New York Herald in 1866. While acting as a correspondent, Church was appointed a principal military adviser of President Benito Juárez. After Juarez had secured his victory, Church unsuccessfully tried to get Washington to intervene in saving the life of Maximilian I of Mexico.

He then explored the River Amazon from 1868, becoming the leading authority on that region of South America. At this point, he spoke fluent Spanish, Portuguese and French, and was familiar with many Amerindian languages of Mexico, and Central and South America. In 1869, Church was appointed by the Government of Bolivia to find a way to explore a navigation enterprise that linked the Mamoré and Madeira Rivers, to extract raw materials from the Amazon jungle. However, on realizing the difficulty of this undertaking from the Pacific Ocean side of the mountains, in 1870 he gained a concession from the Government of Brazil to explore the construction of a railway to connect the border states of Rondônia and Acre to the navigable Amazon River at Porto Velho. He made two failed attempts to construct the Madeira-Mamoré Railway, one in 1870 and a second in 1878, both through the failure of sub-contractors who were blighted by malaria.

Appointed United States commissioner to report on Ecuador in 1880, he then advised on railway projects in Argentina in 1889, and was then appointed United States commissioner to Costa Rica in 1895, to report on its debt and railways, with the possibility of improvements to the banana industry. During this period he wrote extensively on South and Central American, its people and its geography, often in partnership with his friend Clements Markham.

== Later life in London ==
This friendship lead him to live most of the last 30 years of his life in London, England, where Church became a vice-president of the Royal Geographical Society, the first non-British citizen to become a Fellow of the Society, and the first non-British citizen to be elected to the council. In 1898 he was elected president of the geographical section of the British Association. In his last years, he travelled to Canada to advise on a new transcontinental railway.

== Personal life ==
He had an illegitimate daughter with Da. Natalia Palacios Gutiérrez called Margarita, of whose existence she found out years later. He was Col. Church legitimately married in England to another lady, but later recognizes his daughter from Bolivia.

It is thanks to his efforts that the manuscripts of Bartholomé Arzans Orsúa y Vela, which remained in Europe for many years without being transcribed, were purchased from the London Museum and donated to Brown University in Rhode Island, USA (Brown University Press). who had these chronicles about Colonial Potosí printed in Mexico under the title of "History of the Imperial Villa of Potosí" in 3 luxury volumes, 60 years later, thus clarifying much of the history about the Viceroyalty of Charcas. The author owns a set of these 3 volumes. (Rolando Rivero L.). Church had met the musician and composer Olivia Sconzia, with whom he had two daughters: Blanche, born in Paris, France, on May 18, 1874; Nora, born in Florence, Italy, on February 2, 1878. He married Alice Helena Carter in 1882, and after her death in 1898, married the daughter of accountant Sir Robert Harding, Anna Marion Chapman. Church died at his home in London on January 4, 1910.

== Legacy and collection ==
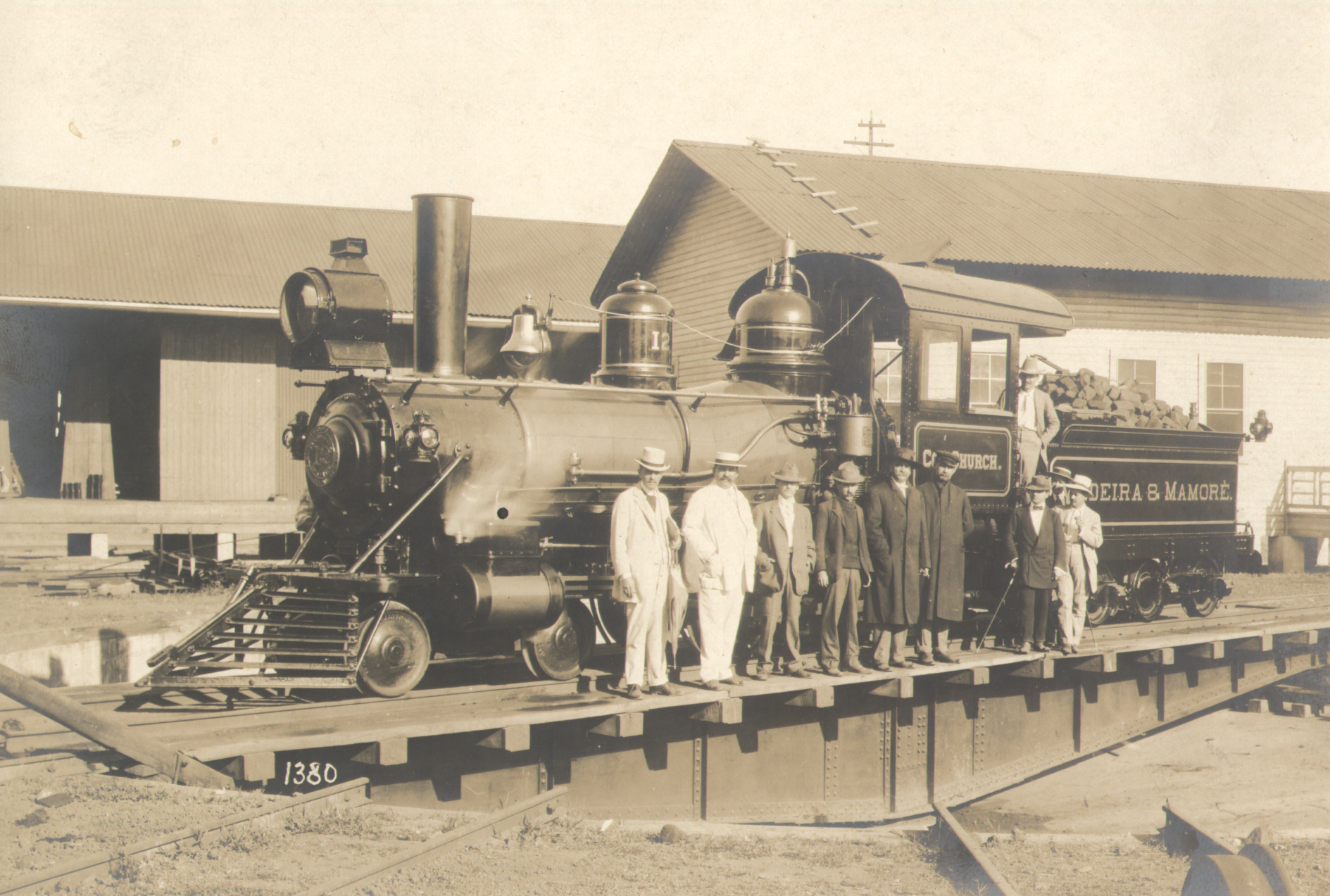
Madeira-Mamoré No. 12 "Coronel Church"

In his will, Church left his collection of over 3,500 volumes of notes and materials to Harvard University, but stipulated that the materials must be kept together. Unable to fulfil the requirement, his second choice Brown University, acquired the collection from his estate in 1912. The collection is stored in Special Collections at the John Hay Library.

Church was the namesake of the Madeira-Mamoré Railroad's No. 12 locomotive, Coronel Church, a 4-4-0 designed by Baldwin Locomotive Works that derailed soon after its first run in 1878. Thought lost to the Brazilian rainforest, the locomotive was rediscovered decades later and refurbished; it now sits on static display at the Madeira-Mamoré Railroad Museum in Porto Velho. The story of Coronel Church was the inspiration for Duke the Lost Engine, the 25th book of the Rev. W. Awdry's Railway Series, as well as the book's 1994 television adaptation.
