= William J. Babcock =

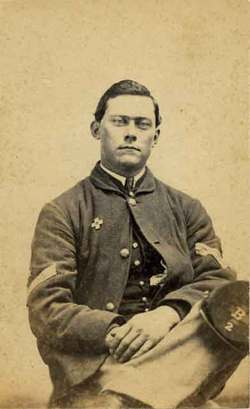
- Born: April 8, 1841; Griswold, Connecticut, U.S.
- Died: October 29, 1897 (aged 56)
- Military career
- Allegiance: United States
- Branch: United States Army; Union Army
- Rank: Sergeant
- Unit: 2nd Rhode Island Infantry
- Conflicts: Third Battle of Petersburg
- Awards: Medal of Honor

William J. Babcock (April 8, 1841 – October 29, 1897) was an American soldier who received the Medal of Honor for valor during the American Civil War.

== Biography ==
Babcock was born in Griswold, Connecticut. He served in the Union Army during the American Civil War in the 2nd Rhode Island Infantry and was promoted to the rank of Color Sergeant. He received the Medal of Honor for his actions at the Third Battle of Petersburg in an assault on Confederate defenses on April 2, 1865. Babcock was the first to enter the Confederate lines and planted the colors on top of the Confederate works. He was awarded the Medal of Honor on March 2, 1895, almost 30 years after his actions.

After the war, he married Phebe Babcock (1845-1900) by whom he had five sons and two daughters. Sergeant Babcock died in 1897 and is buried with his wife in the Riverside Cemetery in South Kingstown, Rhode Island.

== Medal of Honor citation ==
Citation:

Planted the flag upon the parapet while the enemy still occupied the line; was the first of his regiment to enter the works.

== See also ==
- List of American Civil War Medal of Honor recipients: A-F
