= Elisha Hunt Rhodes =

Union Army general

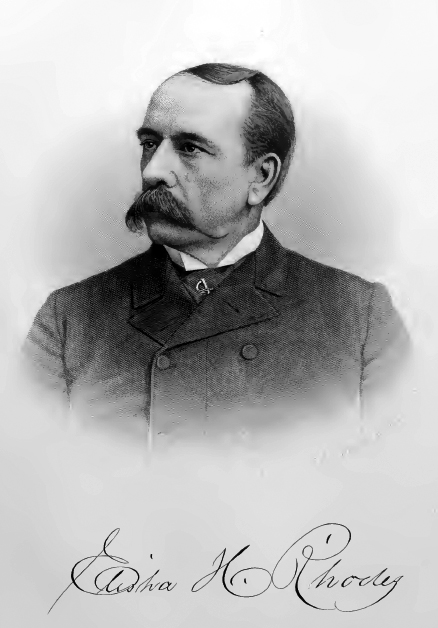
- Born: March 21, 1842; Pawtuxet, Rhode Island
- Died: January 14, 1917 (aged 74); Providence, Rhode Island
- Burial place: Swan Point Cemetery; Providence, Rhode Island
- Spouse: Caroline Pearce Hunt
- Children: 3
- Military career
- Allegiance: United States
- Branch: Union Army; Rhode Island Militia
- Service years: 1861–65 (Army); 1879–92 (Militia)
- Rank: Colonel (Army); Brigadier General (Militia)
- Commands: 2nd Rhode Island Infantry; Rhode Island militia
- Conflicts: American Civil War; First Battle of Bull Run; Battle of Fredericksburg; Battle of Gettysburg; Battle of the Wilderness; Battle of Appomattox Court House

Signature
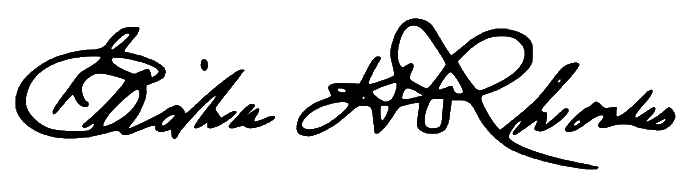

Elisha Hunt Rhodes (March 21, 1842 – January 14, 1917) was an American soldier who served in the Union Army of the Potomac for the entire duration of the American Civil War, rising from corporal to colonel of his regiment by war's end. Rhodes' illustrative diary of his war service was quoted prominently in Ken Burns's 1990 PBS documentary series The Civil War, read by Christopher Murney.

== Early life ==
Rhodes was born in Pawtuxet, Rhode Island, to Elisha H. Rhodes and Eliza A. Chase. He had several sisters and two brothers. At age 14, Rhodes attended Potter and Hammond's Business Academy in Providence.

His father drowned when his schooner, the merchant ship Worcester, was sunk by a hurricane on December 10, 1858. He was buried on Linyards Cay, Abaco in the Bahamas.

== Civil War ==
Rhodes served with the 2nd Rhode Island Volunteer Infantry throughout its service during the American Civil War.

Rhodes enlisted in the war with his mother's permission. At first he believed war to be an adventure. During the war, he advanced from corporal to lieutenant colonel in command of the regiment.

He enlisted on June 5, 1861 and was appointed to the rank of corporal. He was promoted to sergeant major on March 1, 1862 and to 2nd lieutenant on July 24 of the same year.

On April 15, 1863 he was promoted to 1st lieutenant and placed in command of Company B. He became the regiment's adjutant, with the rank of 1st lieutenant, on November 6, 1863. He served in this capacity until the regiment was reorganized on June 17, 1864.

On June 21, 1864 he was promoted to captain and assigned to Company B but was also ordered to command the regiment, which he did for the remainder of the war. He received a brevet (honorary promotion) to the rank of major on December 5, 1864.

On February 6, 1865 he was promoted to lieutenant colonel and placed in command of the regiment. On April 2 he received a brevet to the rank of colonel in recognition of his service in the Petersburg campaign. He was mustered out of service, along with his regiment, on July 13, 1865.

== Postbellum career ==
After the war, he became a successful businessman and became active in veterans' affairs. He never missed a regimental reunion of the 2nd Rhode Island Volunteer Infantry.

He married Caroline Pearce Hunt (1841–1930) on June 12, 1866. Together, they had a son, Frederick Miller Rhodes, and a daughter, Alice Caroline Rhodes Chace.

He was appointed as collector of U.S. Internal Revenue in Rhode Island in 1875.

From June 25, 1879, until March 21, 1892, he served as the commander of the Brigade of Rhode Island Militia with the rank of brigadier general.

During his time in office, General Rhodes helped transform the militia into a more professional organization and established the state training ground at Quonset Point in North Kingstown.

== Memberships ==
Rhodes was very active in the Grand Army of the Republic (GAR), the largest of several organizations for Union veterans. He was Adjutant of Prescott Post, No. 1, in 1867, Commander of the post the next year, Assistant Adjutant General of the Department of Rhode Island in 1871, Commander of the department in 1872–73, member of the National Encampment in 1874–75. He served for one year (1877–78) as the GAR's national senior vice commander.

He was also Vice President of the Society of the Army of the Potomac in 1877, and president of the Second Rhode Island Volunteer Association. He was also president of the Rhode Island Soldiers' and Sailors' Historical Society since its formation in 1873, and in 1879 was Vice President of the 6th Army Corps Association.

In 1892 he was elected as a companion of the Massachusetts Commandery of the Military Order of the Loyal Legion of the United States (MOLLUS) — a military society composed of officers who had served in the Union armed forces during the Civil War. He was assigned MOLLUS insignia number 9476.

An active Freemason, having joined the fraternity while home on leave in 1864, he served as Worshipful Master of Harmony Lodge, No. 9, in Cranston, Rhode Island. He was later elected Grand Master of the Grand Lodge of Rhode Island for 1892-1893.

== Death and burial ==
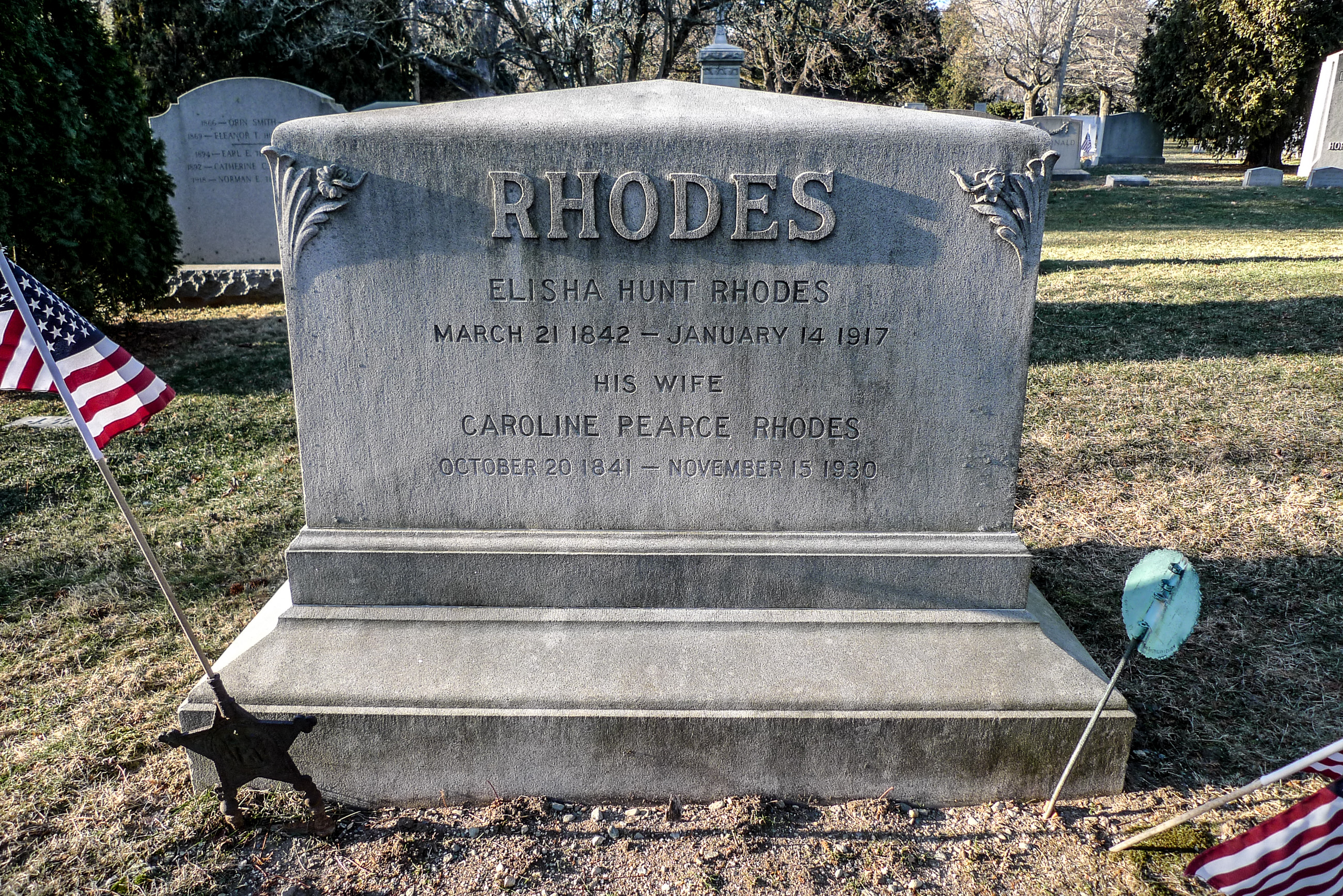
Grave of Elisha Hunt Rhodes in Swan Point Cemetery, Providence, RI.

Rhodes died in Providence on January 14, 1917. He and his wife are buried at the Rhodes family plot in Swan Point Cemetery in Providence.

== Legacy ==
Elisha Hunt Rhodes is most remembered for his wartime journal and letters published as All for the Union by a great-grandson, Robert H. Rhodes. This diary reflects Rhodes' ideas about the Civil War, including his unwavering belief that the Union must be preserved, as well as his Christian faith and belief in God. At the end it shows a somewhat conflicted young man who wanted to be home with his family after trials of war but who also found life in the Army very agreeable to him. His writings were made famous by their incorporation into filmmaker Ken Burns' 1990 landmark PBS-TV documentary series The Civil War.

His large collection of personal relics and mementos is now owned by the Rhode Island Historical Society in Providence.

== Bibliography ==
- Dyer, Elisha (1892). Report of the Adjutant General, 1892 (PDF). Annual report of the Adjutant General of Rhode Island. Providence, RI: Rhode Island. Adjutant-General's Office. OCLC 368009086.
- Dyer, Frederick Henry (1908). A Compendium of the War of the Rebellion (PDF). Des Moines, IA: Dyer Pub. Co. p. 1634. ASIN B01BUFJ76Q.
- Federal Publishing Company (1908). Military Affairs and Regimental Histories of Maine, New Hampshire, Vermont, Massachusetts, Rhode Island, Connecticut, Pennsylvania, And Delaware (PDF). The Union Army: A History of Military Affairs in the Loyal States, 1861–65 – Records of the Regiments in the Union army – Cyclopedia of battles – Memoirs of Commanders and Soldiers. Vol. I. Madison, WI: Federal Publishing Company. p. 555. OCLC 694018100.
- Rhodes, Elisha Hunt (1985).Rhodes, Robert Hunt (ed.). All for the Union: The Civil War Diary & Letters of Elisha Hunt Rhodes (1st ed.). Lincoln, RI: A. Mowbray. p. 256. ISBN 0917218213. OCLC 572546606.
- "Elisha Hunt Rhodes of the 2nd Rhode Island Volunteer's: The Back Rhodes". RhodesFamily.org. The Back Rhodes of Our Genealogy.
- Rolston, Les (2009). Long Time Gone: Neighbors Divided by Civil War. Buena Vista, VA: Mariner Pub. ISBN 9780982017272. OCLC 709528187.
