= Thomas Parker (soldier, born 1822) =

- Thomas Parker, recipient of the Medal of Honor
- Born: 1822; England
- Died: April 27, 1872 (aged 50); Philadelphia
- Burial place: Philadelphia Memorial Cemetery, Frazer, Pennsylvania
- Military career
- Allegiance: United States
- Branch: United States Army
- Service years: 1861–1865
- Rank: Corporal
- Conflicts: Third Battle of Petersburg; Battle of Sayler's Creek
- Awards: Medal of Honor

Corporal Thomas Parker was a Union Army soldier of the 2nd Rhode Island Infantry who received the Medal of Honor for heroism during the American Civil War.

== Biography ==
Thomas Parker was born in 1822 in England.

Following the outbreak of the American Civil War, Parker enlisted as a private in Company D of the 2nd Rhode Island Infantry on June 6, 1861. He re-enlisted in the regiment on December 26, 1863. On June 17, 1864, the regiment was re-organized following the discharge of the original three year enlistees and Parker was transferred to Company B and promoted to corporal. He was wounded in action near Winchester, Virginia, on September 19, 1864.

Corporal Parker received the Medal of Honor for his actions during the Third Battle of Petersburg, Virginia and the Battle of Sayler's Creek, Virginia on April 2, 1865, and April 6, 1865. He was mustered out of service with his regiment on July 13, 1865. Parker's Medal of Honor was officially awarded on May 29, 1867.

After the war, Parker lived in Pennsylvania. He died in Philadelphia on April 27, 1872. He was originally interred in the American Mechanics Cemetery in Philadelphia. After that burial ground was closed in May 1951, he was re-interred to Philadelphia Memorial Cemetery in Frazer, Pennsylvania.

== Medal of Honor citation ==
Planted the first color on the enemy's works. Carried the regimental colors over the creek after the regiment had broken and been repulsed.
