= Madeira-Mamoré Railroad =

Abandoned railroad built in the Brazilian state of Rondônia

Map of the Madeira-Mamoré Railroad

The Madeira-Mamoré Railroad is an abandoned railroad built in the Brazilian state of Rondônia between 1907 and 1912, during the rubber boom. The railroad links the cities of Porto Velho and Guajará-Mirim. It became known as the "Devil's Railroad" because thousands of construction workers died from tropical diseases and violence.

== History ==
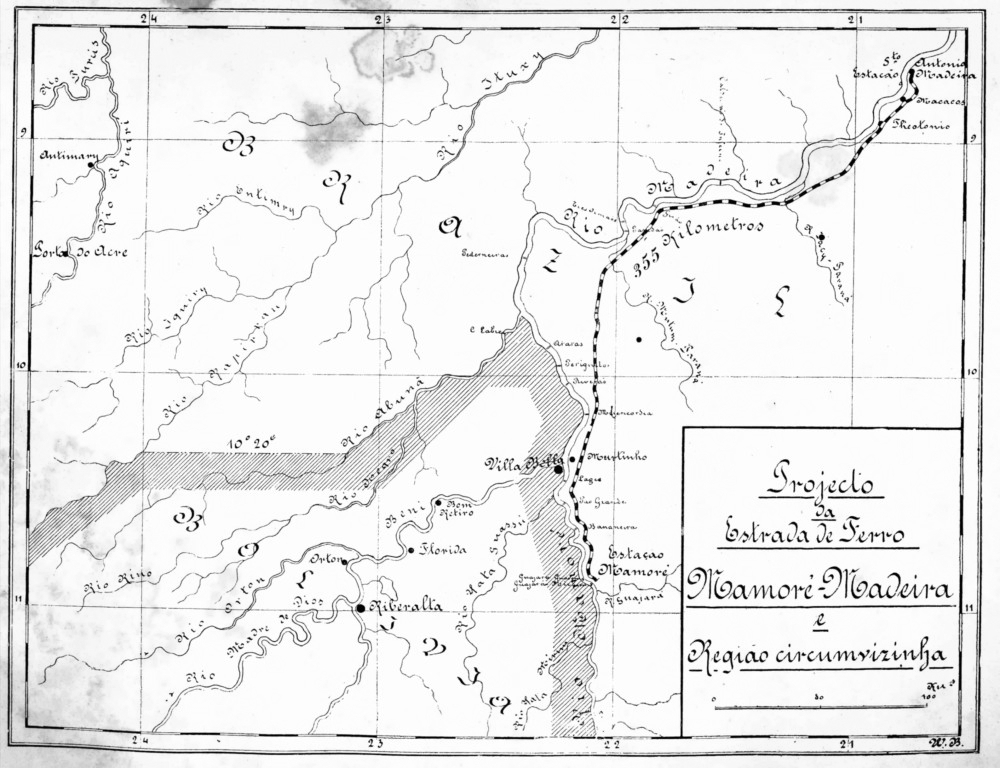
Proposal map of the Madeira-Mamoré Railroad

In 1846, José Augustin Palácios and Rudolf Oscar Kesselring convinced authorities in Bolivia that the best way to secure access to the Atlantic Ocean was through the Amazon. Bolivia had access to the Pacific Ocean, which was later lost to Chile in the War of the Pacific in 1884, but the lucrative trade routes with the United States and Europe were in the Atlantic. In 1851, the government of the United States became interested in access to Bolivian products (notably rubber), and contracted Lieutenant Lardner Gibbon to study the viability of a rail link between the navigable Amazon River and Bolivian production centres. Gibbon's study concluded that a railroad along the Madeira River rapids would allow efficient transport of goods from the Bolivian capital of La Paz to US markets.

=== Construction ===
During the 1870s, the American George Earl Church made two attempts to overcome the Madeira River rapids in order to gain access to Bolivian rubber markets. Both efforts were defeated by the difficult terrain and by appalling loss of life to malaria, accidents, and violence. A successful bid to build the railroad began with the Treaty of Petrópolis (1903) whereby Bolivia gave Brazil the territory of Acre (191,000 km²), in exchange for Brazilian territory, a monetary payment, and a pledge that Brazil would build a rail link to bypass the rapids on the Madeira river. Construction began in 1907, and on April 30, 1912, the final leg of the Madeira-Mamoré Railway was inaugurated. The Chief Accountant from Oct 1911 - Sept 1913 was Mark E. Smith.

=== The "Devil's Rail-road" ===
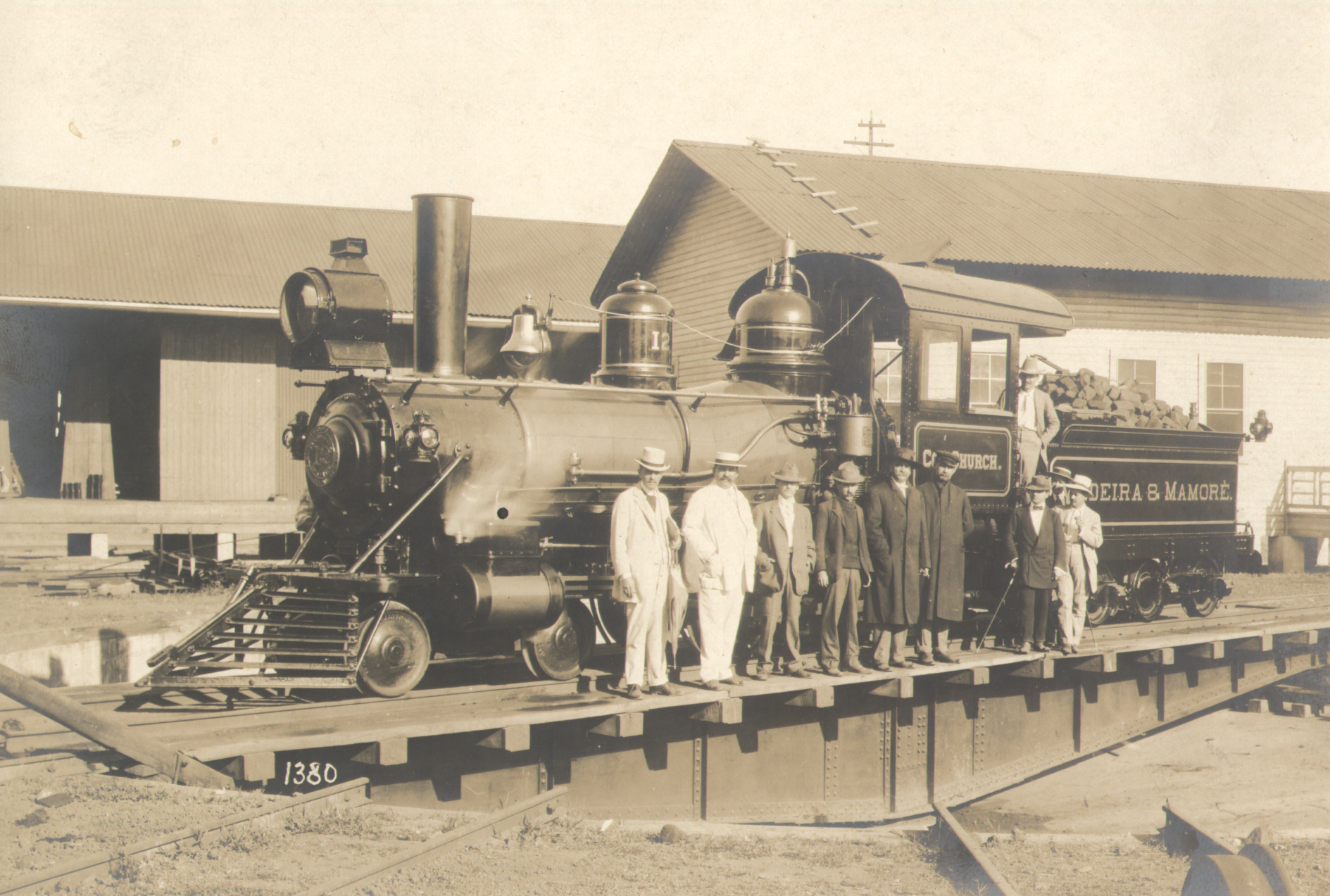
Baldwin Locomotive No. 12 of the Madeira-Mamoré Railroad

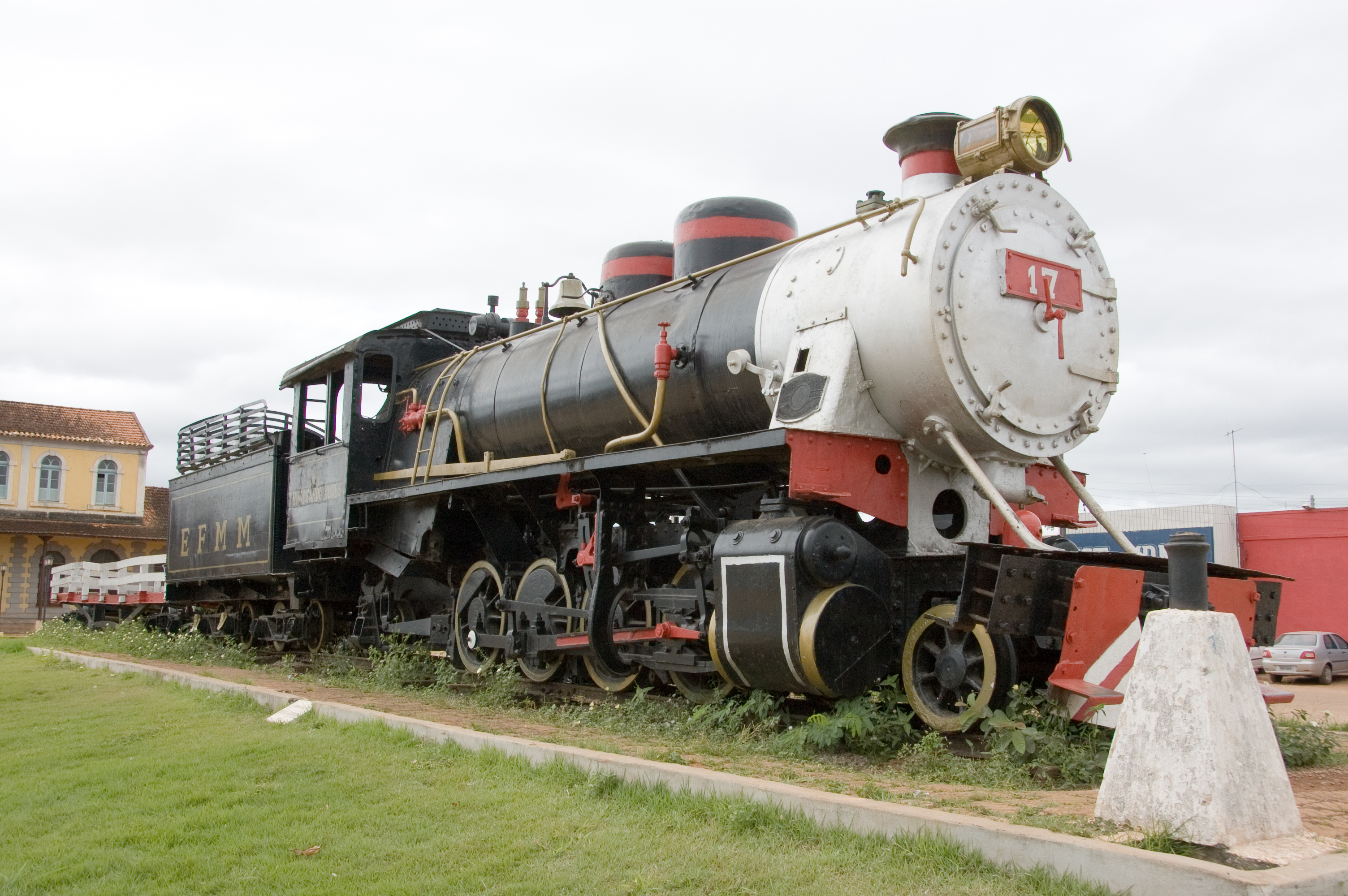
1936 BMAG Berliner Maschinenbau (Mikado Type) 2-8-2 N°17 & N°18 EFMM Guajará-Mirim

There are no accurate figures for the number of lives lost during the construction of the railroad. In his book Brazil, novelist Errol Lincoln Uys puts the number between 7,000 and 10,000. The Brazilian government estimates 6,000 workers lost their lives. Fiorelo Picoli in his book, O Capital e a Devastação da Amazônica, puts the figure at more than 30,000. The loss of life may seem low compared to other complex constructions projects in difficult terrain. By comparison, construction of the Panama Canal claimed 30,609 lives (5609 workers died during the 10 year US management, the remainder perished while under the jurisdiction of France) because of yellow fever. However, much of the "devil's railroad" legend is based on the much deadlier failed attempts by George Church, and on the Brazilian rubber boom itself, which cost tens of thousands of lives.

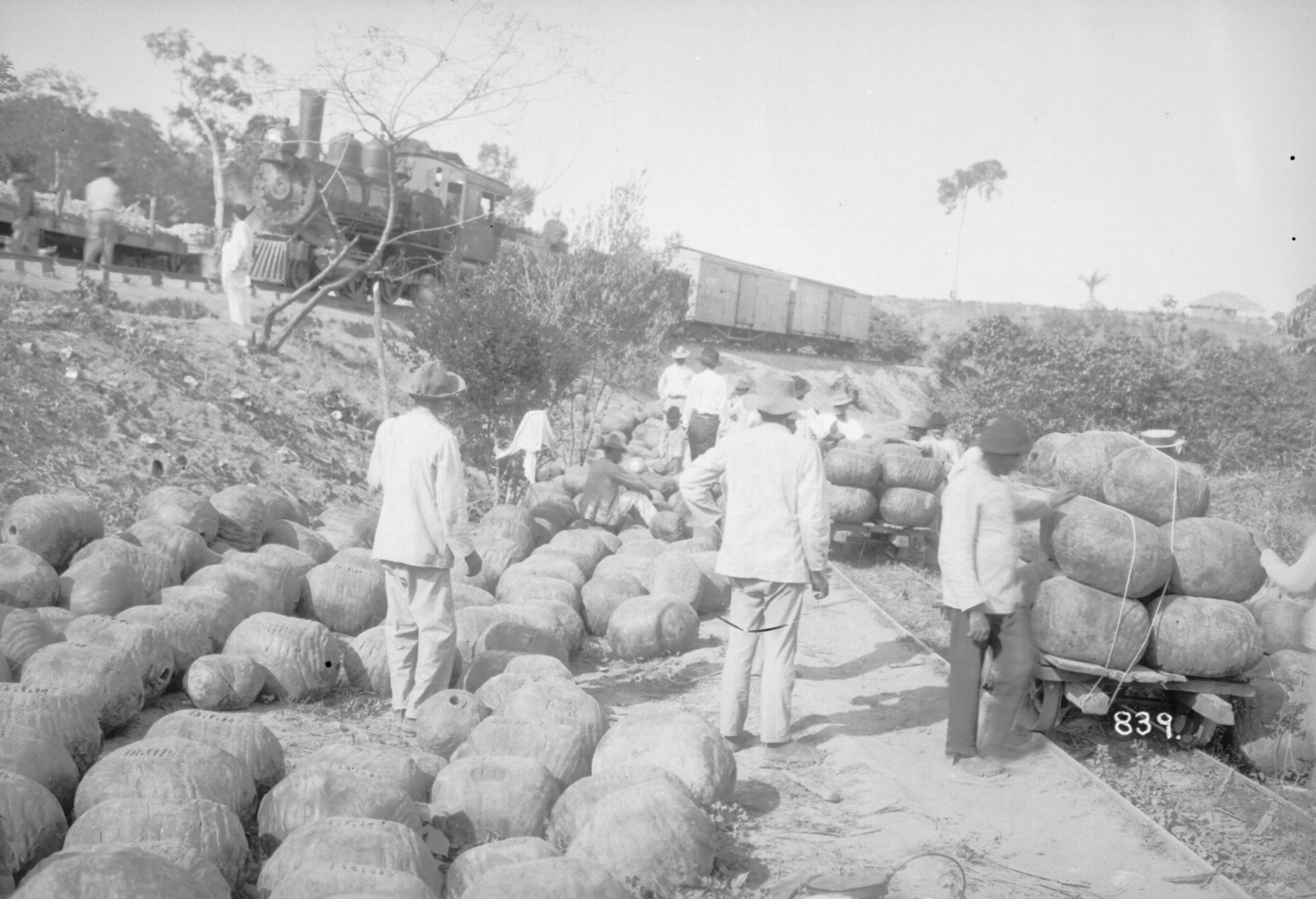
Bundles of rubber awaiting transportation along the Madeira-Mamore railway

=== Competition from Roads and Dams ===
The South American rubber boom ended because of competition from Asian producers and synthetic rubber, and the railroad became redundant. Initially, the Brazilian government was forced to maintain the superfluous facilities because of its obligations under the Treaty of Petrópolis. However, in 1972 Brazil completed the BR-364 linking Bolivia to navigable regions of the Amazon and the railroad was abandoned. The (IIRSA) South American integration project includes a series of hydroelectric dams that will transform the Madeira river rapids into navigable lakes, finally realizing Gibbon's vision of fast and efficient access to Bolivian markets (two of the four dams already exist, the Santo Antônio Dam and the Jirau Dam). If the project is completed, "more than 4,000 km of waterways upstream from the dams in Brazil, Bolivia, and Peru would become navigable."
