= Horatio Rogers Jr. =

American judge (1836–1904)

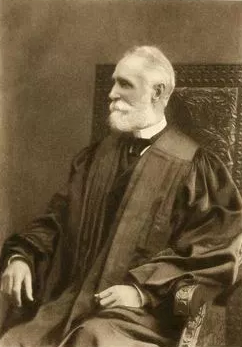

Associate Justice of the Rhode Island Supreme Court
- In office 1891–1903

Attorney General of Rhode Island
- In office 1888–1889
- Governor: Royal C. Taft
- Preceded by: Ziba O. Slocum
- Succeeded by: Ziba O. Slocum
- In office 1864–1867
- Governor: James Y. Smith; Ambrose Burnside
- Preceded by: Abraham Payne
- Succeeded by: Willard Sayles

Personal details
- Born: May 18, 1836 Providence, Rhode Island, United States
- Died: November 12, 1904 (aged 68) Providence, Rhode Island, United States
- Resting place: Swan Point Cemetery
- Party: Republican
- Other political affiliations: National Union (1864–1865)
- Spouse(s): Lucia Waterman; Emily Priscilla Smith
- Children: 1
- Education: Brown University

Military service
- Allegiance: United States
- Branch/service: Union Army
- Rank: Colonel; Brevet Brigadier General
- Unit: 3rd Rhode Island Heavy Artillery Regiment
- Commands: 11th Rhode Island Infantry Regiment; 2nd Rhode Island Infantry Regiment
- Battles/wars: American Civil War: Siege of Fort Pulaski; Battle of Gettysburg

Horatio Rogers Jr. (May 18, 1836 – November 12, 1904) was an American lawyer, judge, and Union Army officer in the American Civil War. He was the Attorney General of Rhode Island from 1864 to 1867 and again from 1888 to 1889. From 1891 to 1903, he served as an Associate Justice of the Rhode Island Supreme Court.

== Early life and family ==
Rogers was born on May 18, 1836, in Providence, Rhode Island, United States. He was the son of Susan (née Curtis) and Horatio Rogers Sr., and had an older brother, John Henry, who became an Episcopal priest.

He attended Brown University as an undergraduate, before going on to earn his Legum Doctor elsewhere.

== Civil War ==
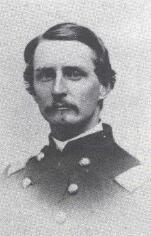
Rogers as a colonel during the American Civil War.

During the American Civil War, Rogers first served as a major of the 3rd Rhode Island Heavy Artillery, then as a colonel of the 11th Rhode Island Infantry, and finally as a colonel and commander of the 2nd Rhode Island Infantry. He commanded the 2nd Rhode Island at the Battle of Gettysburg. After the battle, he wrote, "Death seemed to be holding a carnival."

He resigned from the Army on January 14, 1864. On March 13, 1865, he was brevetted brigadier general, US Volunteers, for "gallant and meritorious service during the war."

== Law career ==
After returning from the war, Rogers became a prominent lawyer and jurist. In 1864, he ran for Attorney General of Rhode Island. He was nominated on March 15, 1864, by the Rhode Island National Union (Republican) Convention. On election day on April 6, won with 96% of the vote, receiving 10,395 votes against Walter S. Burges' 284 and 123 other votes. He served until 1867 and again from 1888 to 1889.

He also worked as a partner in his manufacturing company of his father-in-law, James Y. Smith. In 1891, he was appointed to a newly created seat as an Associate Justice of the Rhode Island Supreme Court, serving until 1903.

== Death ==
Rogers died on November 12, 1904, aged 68.

== Personal life ==
Rogers was married twice. His first wife, Lucia Waterman, died in 1867, and the couple had Arthur, who became an Episcopal priest and died in 1938, and Lucian Waterman, who died in 1927. His second wife, Emily Priscilla Smith, was the daughter of James Y. Smith, who was Mayor of Providence and Governor of Rhode Island. In 1864, Rogers and Smith had one child, Emily Priscilla Smith Rogers.

The Rogers family lived in a Queen Anne style house at 264 Bowen Street in Providence. It was built for Rogers in 1887 to a design by noted Providence architect Alpheus C. Morse.

== Works ==
In addition to his legal profession, Rogers was a member of the American Antiquarian Society and authored several books during his lifetime. His best-known work was Private Libraries of Providence, which included sketches and descriptions of libraries in Providence homes, at a time when common access to libraries was uncommon. In addition to information on his own library, the book contained entries on the private libraries of some of Rhode Island's most prominent citizens, including John Russell Bartlett, Royal C. Taft, and John Carter Brown's library.

They are listed as follows:

- Private Libraries of Providence. Providence, Rhode Island: S. S. Rider. 1878.
- Hadden's Journal and Orderly Books: A Journal Kept in Canada and Upon Burgoyne's Campaign in 1776 and 1777. Albany, New York: Joel Munsell's Sons. 1884. "Horatio Rogers."
- Discourse Before the Rhode Island Society at its Centennial Celebration of Rhode Island's Adoption of the Federal Constitution. Providence, Rhode Island: The Providence Press. 1890. ISBN 9783744735094. LCCN 04000386.
- Mary Dyer of Rhode Island, the Quaker Martyr That Was Hanged on Boston Common, June 1, 1660. Providence, Rhode Island: Preston and Rounds. 1896. ISBN 978-1534991170. "Horatio Rogers."
- The Influence of College Inspiration on After Life. Providence, Rhode Island: Preston and Rounds. 1898.

Political offices
Preceded by Newly created seat	Justice of the Rhode Island Supreme Court; 1891–1903	Succeeded by
