= 11th Rhode Island Infantry Regiment =

- Active: October 1, 1862 to July 13, 1863
- Country: United States
- Allegiance: Union
- Branch: Infantry

Commanders
- Notable commanders: Horatio Rogers Jr.

The 11th Rhode Island Infantry Regiment was a unit of the Union Army during the American Civil War.

== Service history ==
The 11th Rhode Island Infantry Regiment was organized at Camp Stevens Providence, Rhode Island and mustered into service on October 1, 1862, for a term of service of nine months. It was initially commanded by Colonel Edwin Metcalf, then by Colonel Horatio Rogers Jr. and finally by George Earl Church for the remainder of its service.

The regiment left Rhode Island for Washington, D.C., on October 6. Attached to Military District of Washington, D.C., to December, 1862. District of Alexandria, Defences of Washington, and 22nd Army Corps, to April, 1863. 1st Brigade, 1st Division, 7th Army Corps, Department of Virginia, to June, 1863. 2nd Brigade, 1st Division, 4th Army Corps, Department of Virginia to July, 1863.

Duty at East Capitol Hill, Fort Ethan Allen (Note: Built by Vermont volunteers and named after the famous commander of the Green Mountain Boys, the fort had a garrison of as many as 1,000 men. Containing emplacements for 36 guns, it formed a part of the defenses of Chain Bridge and commanded the approaches south of Pimmit Run. Its position allowed mutual support with Fort Marcy to the north alongside the macadmized Leesburg and Georgetown Turnpike as well as Batteries Martin Scott and Vermont across the Potomac.) and Miner's Hill, Defences of Washington, till January 14, 1863. Guard duty at Convalescent Camp till April 15. Moved to Norfolk, thence to Suffolk April 15–19. Siege of Suffolk April 19 – May 4. Siege of Suffolk raised May 4. Expedition to destroy Norfolk & Petersburg Railroad and Seaboard & Roanoke Railroad May 16–27. Expedition to Blackwater June 12–18. Moved to Norfolk June 19, thence to Yorktown, and to Williamsburg June 22. Duty at Williamsburg till June 30. Left Yorktown for home July 2. Mustered out July 13, 1863.

== Losses ==
The regiment lost 8 men by disease.

== Commanding officers ==
- Colonel Edwin Metcalf; October 1, 1862 to November 9, 1862
- Lieutenant Colonel J. Talbot Pittman (acting); November 10, 1862 to January 22, 1863
- Colonel Horatio Rogers Jr.; January 23, 1863 to March 19, 1863
- Colonel George E. Church; March 20, 1863 to July 13, 1863

== See also ==
- List of Rhode Island Civil War units
