= 2017 Cruzeiro EC season =

Cruzeiro
2017 season
- President: Gilvan Tavares
- Manager: Mano Menezes
- Stadium: Mineirão
- Série A: 5th
- Campeonato Mineiro: Runners-up
- Copa do Brasil: Winners
- Primeira Liga: Semi-finals
- Copa Sudamericana: First stage
- Top goalscorer: League: Thiago Neves (11); All: Thiago Neves (17)
- Highest home attendance: 61,146 vs Flamengo (27 September, Copa do Brasil)
- Lowest home attendance: 7,057 vs Chapecoense (9 February, Primeira Liga)
- Average home league attendance: 17,452
- Biggest win: 6–0 vs São Francisco-PA (22 February, Copa do Brasil)
- Biggest defeat: 1–3 vs Atlético Mineiro (2 July, Série A); 1–3 vs Atlético Mineiro (22 October, Série A)
Home colours	Away colours	Third colours

The 2017 season was the 96th in the Cruzeiro Esporte Clube's existence. Along with the Campeonato Brasileiro Série A, the club also competed in the Campeonato Mineiro, the Primeira Liga, the Copa do Brasil and the Copa Sudamericana.

This season is marked by Cruzeiro's 5th Copa do Brasil title, won on penalties over Flamengo on 27 September at Mineirão, which ended a 14-year drought of national cups by the club.

== Competitions ==
=== Overview ===
Competition	First match	Last match	Starting round	Final position	Record							
Competition	First match	Last match	Starting round	Final position	Pld	W	D	L	GF	GA	GD	Win %
Campeonato Mineiro	29 January	7 May	Matchday 1	Runners-up	15	9	5	1	24	11	+13	60.00
Campeonato Brasileiro Série A	14 May	3 December	Round 1	5th	38	15	12	11	47	39	+8	39.47
Primeira Liga	1 February	3 September	Group stage	Semi-finals	5	3	2	0	7	2	+5	60.00
Copa do Brasil	15 February	27 September	First round	Winners	14	7	5	2	23	9	+14	50.00
Copa Sudamericana	4 April	10 May	First stage	First stage	2	1	0	1	3	3	+0	50.00
Total					74	35	24	15	104	64	+40	47.30

Source: Competitions

=== Campeonato Mineiro ===
==== First stage ====
Pos	Team	Pld	W	D	L	GF	GA	GD	Pts	Qualification or relegation
1	Atlético Mineiro	11	9	0	2	26	9	+17	27	Knockout stage
2	Cruzeiro	11	8	3	0	20	8	+12	27	Knockout stage
3	América Mineiro	11	5	4	2	15	9	+6	19	Knockout stage
4	URT	11	5	4	2	14	11	+3	19	Knockout stage
5	Caldense	11	5	2	4	13	14	−1	17	

Updated to match(es) played on 13 April 2017. Source:
Rules for classification: 1) points; 2) wins; 3) goal difference; 4) goals scored; 5) head-to-head results; 6) least red cards received; 7) least yellow cards received; 8) draw.

29 January 1	Villa Nova	1–2	Cruzeiro	Belo Horizonte
17:00 UTC−3	Ronieli Gomes dos Santos 74'	Report	Ariel Cabral 44'; Robinho 70'	Stadium: Mineirão; Attendance: 9,894; Referee: Ricardo Marques Ribeiro

5 February 2	Cruzeiro	2–1	Tricordiano	Belo Horizonte
17:00 UTC−3	Ábila 19', 86'	Report	Carrara 71'	Stadium: Mineirão; Attendance: 7,135; Referee: Antônio Márcio Teixeira da Silva

11 February 3	Tupi	0–4	Cruzeiro	Juiz de Fora
16:30 UTC−3		Report	Rafael Sóbis 19', 90+1'; Léo 26'; Robinho 45+2'	Stadium: Mário Heleno; Attendance: 6,037; Referee: Renato Cardoso da Conceição

18 February 4	URT	1–1	Cruzeiro	Patos de Minas
16:30 UTC−3	Gabriel Ceará 68'	Report	Ábila 62' (pen.)	Stadium: Zama Maciel; Attendance: 3,022; Referee: Emerson de Almeida Ferreira

2 March 5	Cruzeiro	2–1	Caldense	Belo Horizonte
20:30 UTC−3	Henrique 31', 38'	Report	Wellington Rato 90+2'	Stadium: Mineirão; Attendance: 11,311; Referee: Jeferson Antonio da Costa

5 March 6	América TO	0–1	Cruzeiro	Teófilo Otoni
16:00 UTC−3		Report	Alisson 30'	Stadium: Nassri Mattar; Attendance: 3,970; Referee: Ricardo Marques Ribeiro

12 March 7	América Mineiro	0–1	Cruzeiro	Belo Horizonte
16:00 UTC−3		Report	Rafael Sóbis 16' (pen.)	Stadium: Estádio Independência; Attendance: 13,834; Referee: Cleisson Veloso Pereira

19 March 8	Cruzeiro	1–1	Tombense	Belo Horizonte
16:00 UTC−3	De Arrascaeta 30'	Report	Alex Gonçalves 46'	Stadium: Mineirão; Attendance: 10,971; Referee: Murilo Francisco Misson Júnior

27 March 9	Uberlândia	2–2	Cruzeiro	Uberlândia
20:00 UTC−3	Schumacher 7'; Caio Dantas 90+2'	Report	Rafael Sóbis 45+1' (pen.); Ábila 53'	Stadium: Parque do Sabiá; Attendance: 14,008; Referee: Ricardo Marques Ribeiro

1 April 10	Cruzeiro	2–1	Atlético Mineiro	Belo Horizonte
16:00 UTC−3	Thiago Neves 1'; De Arrascaeta 59'	Report	Elias 87'	Stadium: Mineirão; Attendance: 40,397; Referee: Igor Júnio Benevenuto

9 April 11	Cruzeiro	2–0	Democrata GV	Belo Horizonte
11:00 UTC−3	Dedé 18'; Ábila 72' (pen.)	Report		Stadium: Mineirão; Attendance: 16,864; Referee: Antonio Márcio Teixeira da Silva

==== Knockout phase ====
===== Semi-finals =====
16 April First leg	América Mineiro	1–1	Cruzeiro	Belo Horizonte
16:00 UTC−3	Messias 61'	Report	Thiago Neves 67'	Stadium: Estádio Independência; Attendance: 4,429; Referee: Igor Júnio Benevenuto

23 April Second leg	Cruzeiro	2–0 (3–1 agg.)	América Mineiro	Belo Horizonte
18:00 UTC−3	De Arrascaeta 21', 90+1'	Report		Stadium: Mineirão; Attendance: 21,569; Referee: Emerson de Almeida Ferreira

===== Final =====
30 April First leg	Cruzeiro	0–0	Atlético Mineiro	Belo Horizonte
16:00 UTC−3		Report		Stadium: Mineirão; Attendance: 40,675; Referee: Dewson Fernando Freitas da Silva

7 May Second leg	Atlético Mineiro	2–1 (2–1 agg.)	Cruzeiro	Belo Horizonte
16:00 UTC−3	Robinho 12'; Elias 69'	Report	Ábila 52'	Stadium: Independência; Attendance: 22,411; Referee: Igor Júnio Benevenuto

=== Campeonato Brasileiro Série A ===
==== League table ====
Pos	Team	Pld	W	D	L	GF	GA	GD	Pts	Qualification or relegation
3	Santos	38	17	12	9	42	32	+10	63	Qualification for Copa Libertadores group stage
4	Grêmio	38	18	8	12	55	36	+19	62	Qualification for Copa Libertadores group stage
5	Cruzeiro	38	15	12	11	47	39	+8	57	Qualification for Copa Libertadores group stage
6	Flamengo	38	15	11	12	49	38	+11	56	Qualification for Copa Libertadores group stage
7	Vasco da Gama	38	15	11	12	40	47	−7	56	Qualification for Copa Libertadores second stage

Source: CBF
Rules for classification: 1) points; 2) wins; 3) goal difference; 4) goals scored; 5) head-to-head results; 6) least red cards received; 7) least yellow cards received; 8) draw.

==== Results by round ====
Round	1	2	3	4	5	6	7	8	9	10	11	12	13	14	15	16	17	18	19	20	21	22	23	24	25	26	27	28	29	30	31	32	33	34	35	36	37	38
Ground	H	A	A	H	A	H	A	H	A	H	A	H	A	H	A	A	H	A	H	A	H	H	A	H	A	H	A	H	A	H	A	H	A	H	H	A	H	A
Result	W	D	W	L	L	W	L	D	L	W	L	W	W	D	D	L	D	W	D	L	W	D	W	W	W	D	W	W	L	L	D	W	L	W	D	D	L	D
Position	7	4	3	8	10	6	14	7	12	10	13	7	6	7	8	9	8	7	7	9	6	6	6	6	5	5	4	5	5	5	5	5	5	5	5	5	5	5

Updated to match(es) played on 3 December 2017. Source: Matches
A = Away; H = Home; W = Win; D = Draw; L = Loss

==== Matches ====
14 May 1	Cruzeiro	1–0	São Paulo	Belo Horizonte
16:00 UTC−3	Ábila 47'	Report		Stadium: Mineirão; Attendance: 11,416; Referee: Marcelo de Lima Henrique

21 May 2	Sport	1–1	Cruzeiro	Recife
19:00 UTC−3	Diego Souza 33' (pen.)	Report	Alisson 19'	Stadium: Ilha do Retiro; Attendance: 4,459; Referee: João Batista de Arruda

28 May 3	Santos	0–1	Cruzeiro	Santos
16:00 UTC−3		Report	Thiago Neves 82'	Stadium: Vila Belmiro; Attendance: 7,025; Referee: Eduardo Tomaz de Aquino Valadão

4 June 4	Cruzeiro	0–2	Chapecoense	Belo Horizonte
19:00 UTC−3		Report	Wellington Paulista 27'; Douglas Grolli 47'	Stadium: Mineirão; Attendance: 16,591; Referee: Cláudio Francisco Lima e Silva

8 June 5	Bahia	1–0	Cruzeiro	Salvador
21:00 UTC−3	Edigar Junio 18'	Report		Stadium: Fonte Nova; Attendance: 18,917; Referee: Wagner do Nascimento Magalhães

11 June 6	Cruzeiro	2–0	Atlético Goianiense	Belo Horizonte
18:30 UTC−3	Ábila 61', 79' (pen.)	Report		Stadium: Mineirão; Attendance: 9,902; Referee: João Batista de Arruda

14 June 7	Corinthians	1–0	Cruzeiro	São Paulo
21:45 UTC−3	Balbuena 42'	Report		Stadium: Arena Corinthians; Attendance: 30,465; Referee: Leandro Pedro Vuaden

19 June 8	Cruzeiro	3–3	Grêmio	Belo Horizonte
20:00 UTC−3	Thiago Neves 45'; Rafael Sóbis 48'; Robinho 62'	Report	Everton 16'; Michel 41'; Ramiro 60'	Stadium: Mineirão; Attendance: 20,384; Referee: Raphael Claus

22 June 9	Ponte Preta	1–0	Cruzeiro	Campinas
19:30 UTC−3	Lucca	Report		Stadium: Moisés Lucarelli; Attendance: 4,707; Referee: Grazianni Maciel Rocha

25 June 10	Cruzeiro	2–0	Coritiba	Belo Horizonte
16:00 UTC−3	Thiago Neves 38'; Rafael Sóbis 64'	Report		Stadium: Mineirão; Attendance: 14,190; Referee: Marcelo Aparecido de Souza

2 July 11	Atlético Mineiro	3–1	Cruzeiro	Belo Horizonte
16:00 UTC−3	Cazares 45+2'; Fred 45+5', 79'	Report	Thiago Neves 6'	Stadium: Independência; Attendance: 17,251; Referee: Anderson Daronco

9 July 12	Cruzeiro	3–1	Palmeiras	Belo Horizonte
16:00 UTC−3	Thiago Neves 32'; Hudson 42'; Élber 90+2'	Report	Willian 62'	Stadium: Mineirão; Attendance: 19,090; Referee: Péricles Bassols

12 July 13	Athletico Paranaense	0–2	Cruzeiro	Curitiba
21:45 UTC−3		Report	Lucas Romero 27'; Rafael Marques 85'	Stadium: Arena da Baixada; Attendance: 13,897; Referee: Bráulio da Silva Machado

16 July 14	Cruzeiro	1–1	Flamengo	Belo Horizonte
16:00 UTC−3	Sassá 59'	Report	Éverton 53'	Stadium: Mineirão; Attendance: 43,480; Referee: Rodolpho Toski Marques

20 July 15	Fluminense	1–1	Cruzeiro	Mesquita
19:30 UTC−3	Richarlison 41' (pen.)	Report	Sassá 35'	Stadium: Giulite Coutinho; Attendance: 5,753; Referee: Leandro Pedro Vuaden

23 July 16	Avaí	1–0	Cruzeiro	Florianópolis
16:00 UTC−3	Junior Dutra 21'	Report		Stadium: Ressacada; Attendance: 6,590; Referee: Flávio Rodrigues de Souza

30 July 17	Cruzeiro	0–0	Vitória	Belo Horizonte
19:00 UTC−3		Report		Stadium: Mineirão; Attendance: 12,471; Referee: Dewson Fernando Freitas da Silva

3 August 18	Vasco da Gama	0–3	Cruzeiro	Rio de Janeiro
20:00 UTC−3		Report	Thiago Neves 2'; Sassá 16' (pen.); Robinho 88'	Stadium: São Januário; Attendance: 5,780; Referee: Vinícius Gonçalves Dias Araújo

6 August 19	Cruzeiro	0–0	Botafogo	Belo Horizonte
16:00 UTC−3		Report		Stadium: Mineirão; Attendance: 22,691; Referee: Cláudio Francisco Lima e Silva

13 August 20	São Paulo	3–2	Cruzeiro	São Paulo
11:00 UTC−3	Hernanes 45+1', 82' (pen.); Arboleda 71'	Report	Sassá 51', 57'	Stadium: Morumbi; Attendance: 56,052; Referee: Rafael Traci

20 August 21	Cruzeiro	2–0	Sport	Belo Horizonte
16:00 UTC−3	Sassá 34'; Raniel 81'	Report		Stadium: Mineirão; Attendance: 10,393; Referee: Caio Max Vieira

27 August 22	Cruzeiro	1–1	Santos	Belo Horizonte
19:00 UTC−3	Rafinha 55'	Report	Bruno Henrique 21'	Stadium: Mineirão; Attendance: 12,055; Referee: Anderson Daronco

10 September 23	Chapecoense	1–2	Cruzeiro	Chapecó
19:00 UTC−3	Túlio de Melo 83'	Report	Rafinha 45'; Raniel 63'	Stadium: Arena Condá; Attendance: 9,676; Referee: Leandro Bizzio Marinho

17 September 24	Cruzeiro	1–0	Bahia	Belo Horizonte
16:00 UTC−3	Léo 62'	Report		Stadium: Mineirão; Attendance: 14,384; Referee: Wagner Reway

24 September 25	Atlético Goianiense	1–2	Cruzeiro	Goiânia
16:00 UTC−3	Luiz Fernando 47'	Report	De Arrascaeta 4'; Rafael Sóbis 22'	Stadium: Estádio Olímpico; Attendance: 6,447; Referee: Héber Roberto Lopes

1 October 26	Cruzeiro	1–1	Corinthians	Belo Horizonte
16:00 UTC−3	Rafinha 20'	Report	Clayson 84' (pen.)	Stadium: Mineirão; Attendance: 29,556; Referee: Rodolpho Toski Marques

7 October 28	Cruzeiro	2–1	Ponte Preta	Belo Horizonte
16:00 UTC−3	Thiago Neves 73'; Manoel 75'	Report	Danilo Barcelos 12' (pen.)	Stadium: Mineirão; Attendance: 15,397; Referee: Paulo Roberto Alves Júnior
Note: The match was rescheduled due to a concert that took place in Mineirão in 17 October.

11 October 27	Grêmio	0–1	Cruzeiro	Porto Alegre
21:45 UTC−3		Report	Rafael Sóbis 68'	Stadium: Arena do Grêmio; Attendance: 7,851; Referee: Rodrigo Batista Raposo

18 October 29	Coritiba	1–0	Cruzeiro	Curitiba
19:30 UTC−3	Diogo Barbosa 33' (o.g.)	Report		Stadium: Couto Pereira; Attendance: 6,470; Referee: Marcelo de Lima Henrique

22 October 30	Cruzeiro	1–3	Atlético Mineiro	Belo Horizonte
17:00 UTC−3	Thiago Neves 30'	Report	Otero 60'; Robinho 66', 80'	Stadium: Mineirão; Attendance: 35,921; Referee: Wagner do Nascimento Magalhães

30 October 31	Palmeiras	2–2	Cruzeiro	São Paulo
20:00 UTC−3	Borja 34', 85'	Report	Juninho 5' (o.g.); Robinho 64'	Stadium: Allianz Parque; Attendance: 37,961; Referee: Héber Roberto Lopes

5 November 32	Cruzeiro	1–0	Athletico Paranaense	Belo Horizonte
17:00 UTC−3	De Arrascaeta 40'	Report		Stadium: Mineirão; Attendance: 10,840; Referee: Marcelo Aparecido de Souza

8 November 33	Flamengo	2–0	Cruzeiro	Rio de Janeiro
21:45 UTC−3	Éverton 36'; Vinícius Júnior 90+3'	Report		Stadium: Luso Brasileiro; Attendance: 7,720; Referee: Leandro Bizzio Marinho

12 November 34	Cruzeiro	3–1	Fluminense	Belo Horizonte
19:00 UTC−3	Lucas Romero 16'; Diogo Barbosa 58'; Thiago Neves 72'	Report	Pedro 7'	Stadium: Mineirão; Attendance: 8,644; Referee: André Luiz de Freitas Castro

15 November 35	Cruzeiro	2–2	Avaí	Belo Horizonte
19:30 UTC−3	Thiago Neves 58'; Judivan 78' (pen.)	Report	Junior Dutra 22' (pen.), 90+2'	Stadium: Mineirão; Attendance: 9,259; Referee: Leandro Pedro Vuaden

19 November 36	Vitória	1–1	Cruzeiro	Salvador
17:00 UTC−3	David 20' (pen.)	Report	Alisson 76'	Stadium: Barradão; Attendance: 13,095; Referee: Luiz Flávio de Oliveira

26 November 37	Cruzeiro	0–1	Vasco da Gama	Belo Horizonte
17:00 UTC−3		Report	Paulão 20'	Stadium: Mineirão; Attendance: 14,930; Referee: Raphael Claus

3 December 38	Botafogo	2–2	Cruzeiro	Rio de Janeiro
17:00 UTC−3	Brenner 25'; Ezequiel 69'	Report	Thiago Neves 37'; De Arrascaeta 50'	Stadium: Nilton Santos; Attendance: 20,636; Referee: Leandro Bizzio Marinho

=== Primeira Liga ===
==== Group stage ====
Pos	Team	Pld	W	D	L	GF	GA	GD	Pts	Qualification
1	Cruzeiro	3	2	1	0	3	0	+3	7	Qualifies to the Final stage
2	Atlético Mineiro	3	1	1	1	4	3	+1	4	Qualifies to the Final stage
3	Chapecoense	3	0	2	1	2	4	−2	2	
4	Joinville	3	0	2	1	0	2	−2	2	

1 February 1	Cruzeiro	1–0	Atlético Mineiro	Belo Horizonte
19:30 UTC−3	De Arrascaeta 27'	Report		Stadium: Mineirão; Attendance: 41,530; Referee: Wanderson Alves de Souza

9 February 2	Cruzeiro	2–0	Chapecoense	Belo Horizonte
21:45 UTC−3	Ábila 37', 53'	Report		Stadium: Mineirão; Attendance: 7,057; Referee: Daniel Bins

21 March 3	Joinville	0–0	Cruzeiro	Joinville
19:00 UTC−3		Report		Stadium: Arena Joinville; Attendance: 1,899; Referee: Adriano Milcviski

==== Knockout phase ====
30 August Quarter-final	Cruzeiro	2–0	Grêmio	Belo Horizonte
21:45 UTC−3	Raniel 89'; De Arrascaeta 90+2'	Report		Stadium: Mineirão; Attendance: 7,545; Referee: Paulo Roberto Alves Júnior

3 September Semi-final	Londrina	2–2 (3–1 p)	Cruzeiro	Londrina
11:00 UTC−3	Safira 35'; Germano 90+6' (pen.)	Report	Lucas Silva 20'; Sassá 53'	Stadium: Estádio do Café; Attendance: 15,420; Referee: Leandro Pedro Vuaden
	Penalties
	Germano (penalty scored); Marcinho (penalty missed); Ayrton Lucas (penalty scored); Artur (penalty missed); Dirceu (penalty scored)		(penalty missed) Lucas Silva; (penalty scored) Bryan; (penalty missed) Arthur; (penalty missed) Alex

=== Copa do Brasil ===
The drawn for the first round was held on 15 December 2016.

==== First round ====
15 February	Volta Redonda	1–2	Cruzeiro	Volta Redonda
21:45 UTC−3	Higor Leite 67'	Report	Alisson 14'; Robinho 60'	Stadium: Raulino de Oliveira; Attendance: 2,819; Referee: Marcelo Aparecido de Souza

==== Second round ====
22 February	Cruzeiro	6–0	São Francisco-PA	Belo Horizonte
21:45 UTC−3	Rafael Sóbis 4', 21', 25', 36'; Robinho 17'; De Arrascaeta 76'	Report		Stadium: Mineirão; Attendance: 11,931; Referee: Eduardo Tomaz de Aquino

==== Third round ====
8 March First leg	Murici	0–2	Cruzeiro	Murici
21:45 UTC−3		Report	Manoel 72'; Ábila 88'	Stadium: José Gomes da Costa; Attendance: 2,893; Referee: Jean Pierre Gonçalves Lima

15 March Second leg	Cruzeiro	3–0 (5–0 agg.)	Murici	Belo Horizonte
21:45 UTC−3	Cláudio 32' (o.g.); Rafael Sóbis 37' (pen.); Deysinho 83' (o.g.)	Report		Stadium: Mineirão; Attendance: 9,106; Referee: Sávio Pereira Sampaio

==== Fourth round ====
13 April First leg	São Paulo	0–2	Cruzeiro	São Paulo
21:30 UTC−3		Report	Lucas Pratto 61' (o.g.); Hudson 70'	Stadium: Morumbi; Attendance: 43,662; Referee: Anderson Daronco

19 April Second leg	Cruzeiro	1–2 (3–2 agg.)	São Paulo	Belo Horizonte
19:30 UTC−3	Thiago Neves 60'	Report	Lucas Pratto 14'; Gilberto 78'	Stadium: Mineirão; Attendance: 36,193; Referee: Wilton Pereira Sampaio

==== Round of 16 ====
3 May First leg	Cruzeiro	1–0	Chapecoense	Belo Horizonte
21:45 UTC−3	Raniel 2'	Report		Stadium: Mineirão; Attendance: 11,716; Referee: Flávio Rodrigues de Souza

1 June Second leg	Chapecoense	0–0 (0–1 agg.)	Cruzeiro	Chapecó
21:30 UTC−3		Report		Stadium: Arena Condá; Attendance: 6,387; Referee: Péricles Bassols

==== Quarter-finals ====
28 June First leg	Palmeiras	3–3	Cruzeiro	São Paulo
21:45 UTC−3	Dudu 52', 62'; Willian 65'	Report	Thiago Neves 6'; Robinho 19'; Alisson 30'	Stadium: Allianz Parque; Attendance: 32,067; Referee: Jailson Macêdo Freitas

26 July Second leg	Cruzeiro	1–1 (4a–4 agg.)	Palmeiras	Belo Horizonte
21:45 UTC−3	Diogo Barbosa 85'	Report	Keno 71'	Stadium: Mineirão; Attendance: 44,842; Referee: Wilton Pereira Sampaio

==== Semi-finals ====
16 August First leg	Grêmio	1–0	Cruzeiro	Porto Alegre
21:45 UTC−3	Lucas Barrios 44'	Report		Stadium: Arena do Grêmio; Attendance: 41,711; Referee: Marcelo Aparecido de Souza

23 August Second leg	Cruzeiro	1–0 (1–1 agg.) (3–2 p)	Grêmio	Belo Horizonte
21:45 UTC−3	Hudson 51'	Report		Stadium: Mineirão; Attendance: 55,227; Referee: Wagner do Nascimento Magalhães
	Penalties
	Rafael Sóbis (penalty scored); Robinho (penalty missed); Murilo (penalty missed); Raniel (penalty scored); Thiago Neves (penalty scored)		(penalty scored) Fernandinho; (penalty missed) Edílson; (penalty missed) Everton; (penalty scored) Arthur; (penalty missed) Luan

==== Final ====
7 September First leg	Flamengo	1–1	Cruzeiro	Rio de Janeiro
21:45 UTC−3	Lucas Paquetá 75'	Report	De Arrascaeta 83'	Stadium: Maracanã; Attendance: 66,165; Referee: Marcelo Aparecido de Souza

27 September Second leg	Cruzeiro	0–0 (1–1 agg.) (5–3 p)	Flamengo	Belo Horizonte
21:45 UTC−3		Report		Stadium: Mineirão; Attendance: 61,146; Referee: Luiz Flávio de Oliveira
	Penalties
	Henrique (penalty scored); Léo (penalty scored); Hudson (penalty scored); Diogo Barbosa (penalty scored); Thiago Neves (penalty scored)		(penalty scored) Guerrero; (penalty scored) Juan; (penalty missed) Diego; (penalty scored) Trauco

=== Copa Sudamericana ===
The drawn for the first stage was held on 31 January 2017.

==== First stage ====
4 April First leg	Cruzeiro (Brazil)	2–1	(Paraguay) Nacional	Belo Horizonte, Brazil
21:45 UTC−4	Thiago Neves 26'; Ábila 67'	Report	Jonathan Santana 5'	Stadium: Mineirão; Attendance: 16,784; Referee: Juan Soto (Venezuela)

10 May Second leg	Nacional (Paraguay)	2–1 (3–3 agg.) (3–2 p)	(Brazil) Cruzeiro	Asunción, Paraguay
19:15 UTC−3	Villagra 16'; Adam Bareiro 62'	Report	Thiago Neves 12'	Stadium: Defensores del Chaco; Attendance: 5,000; Referee: Gustavo Murillo (Colombia)
	Penalties
	Salgueiro (penalty missed); Rojas (penalty scored); Miranda (penalty scored); Rodríguez (penalty missed); Dávalos (penalty scored)		(penalty missed) Alisson; (penalty scored) Henrique; (penalty scored) Hudson; (penalty missed) Fabrício; (penalty missed) De Arrascaeta
