= 2017 Copa do Brasil finals =

2017 Copa do Brasil Finals
Flamengo	Cruzeiro
(Rio de Janeiro (state))	(Minas Gerais)
1	1
- Cruzeiro won 5–3 on penalties

First leg
Flamengo	Cruzeiro
1	1
- Date: 7 September 2017
- Venue: Maracanã, Rio de Janeiro
- Man of the Match: Willian Arão (Flamengo)
- Referee: Marcelo Aparecido Ribeiro de Souza (São Paulo)
- Attendance: 66,165

Second leg
Cruzeiro	Flamengo
0	0
- Date: 27 September 2017
- Venue: Mineirão, Belo Horizonte
- Man of the Match: Juan (Flamengo)
- Referee: Luiz Flávio de Oliveira (São Paulo)
- Attendance: 61,017

The 2017 Copa do Brasil Finals was the final two-legged tie that decided the 2017 Copa do Brasil, the 29th season of the Copa do Brasil, Brazil's national cup football tournament organised by the Brazilian Football Confederation.

The finals were contested in a two-legged home-and-away format between Flamengo, from Rio de Janeiro, and Cruzeiro, from Minas Gerais. Both teams reached the Copa do Brasil finals for the seventh time, and the second time they faced each other in this stage. The first one was in the 2003 Copa do Brasil finals.

A draw by CBF was held on 24 August 2017 to determine the home-and-away teams for each leg. The first leg was hosted by Flamengo at Maracanã in Rio de Janeiro on 7 September 2017, while the second leg was hosted by Cruzeiro at Mineirão in Belo Horizonte on 27 September 2017.

Tied 1–1 on aggregate, Cruzeiro defeated Flamengo 5–3 on penalties in the finals to win their fifth title. As champions, Cruzeiro earned the right to play in the 2018 Copa Libertadores Group stage and the 2018 Copa do Brasil Round of 16.

== Teams ==
Team	Previous finals appearances (bold indicates winners)
(Rio de Janeiro (state)) Flamengo	6 (**1990**, 1997, 2003, 2004, **2006**, **2013**)
(Minas Gerais) Cruzeiro	6 (**1993**, **1996**, 1998, **2000**, **2003**, 2014)

=== Road to the final ===
Note: In all scores below, the score of the home team is given first.

(Rio de Janeiro (state)) Flamengo			Round	(Minas Gerais) Cruzeiro		
Opponent	Venue	Score		Opponent	Venue	Score
Bye			First round	(Rio de Janeiro (state)) Volta Redonda	Away	1–2
Bye			Second round	(Pará) São Francisco	Home	6–0
Bye			Third round	(Alagoas) Murici (won 5–0 on aggregate)	Away	0–2
Bye			Third round	(Alagoas) Murici (won 5–0 on aggregate)	Home	3–0
Bye			Fourth round	(São Paulo (state)) São Paulo (won 3–2 on aggregate)	Away	0–2
Bye			Fourth round	(São Paulo (state)) São Paulo (won 3–2 on aggregate)	Home	1–2
(Goiás) Atlético Goianiense (won 2–1 on aggregate)	Home	0–0	Round of 16	(Santa Catarina (state)) Chapecoense (won 1–0 on aggregate)	Home	1–0
(Goiás) Atlético Goianiense (won 2–1 on aggregate)	Away	1–2	Round of 16	(Santa Catarina (state)) Chapecoense (won 1–0 on aggregate)	Away	0–0
(São Paulo (state)) Santos (tied 4–4 on aggregate, won on away goals)	Home	2–0	Quarter-finals	(São Paulo (state)) Palmeiras (tied 4–4 on aggregate, won on away goals)	Away	3–3
(São Paulo (state)) Santos (tied 4–4 on aggregate, won on away goals)	Away	4–2	Quarter-finals	(São Paulo (state)) Palmeiras (tied 4–4 on aggregate, won on away goals)	Home	1–1
(Rio de Janeiro (state)) Botafogo (won 1–0 on aggregate)	Away	0–0	Semi-finals	(Rio Grande do Sul) Grêmio (tied 1–1 on aggregate, won 3–2 on penalties)	Away	1–0
(Rio de Janeiro (state)) Botafogo (won 1–0 on aggregate)	Home	1–0	Semi-finals	(Rio Grande do Sul) Grêmio (tied 1–1 on aggregate, won 3–2 on penalties)	Home	1–0

== Format ==
In the finals, the teams play a single-elimination tournament with the following rules:

- The finals are played on a home-and-away two-legged basis. The home-and-away teams for both legs were determined by a draw held on 24 August 2017 at the Brazilian Football Confederation headquarters in Rio de Janeiro, Brazil.
- If tied on aggregate, the away goals rule and extra time would not be used and the penalty shoot-out would be used to determine the winner. (Regulations Article 12.c).

== Matches ==
=== First leg ===
In the second leg of the Semi-finals against Botafogo, Paolo Guerrero (Flamengo) picked up a yellow card which meant he was suspended for the first leg of the Finals.

In the first leg, Lucas Paquetá, who was selected as Guerrero's substitute, opened the scoring in the 75th minute when he smashed in the rebound after Cruzeiro goalkeeper Fábio blocked a Willian Arão's shot. The equalizer came in the 83rd minute when Thiago failed to block a long-range shot from Hudson, allowing De Arrascaeta to take advantage of the rebound.

7 September 2017
21:45 UTC−3

Flamengo (Rio de Janeiro (state))	1–1	(Minas Gerais) Cruzeiro
Lucas Paquetá 75'	Report	De Arrascaeta 83'

Maracanã, Rio de Janeiro
Attendance: 66,165
Referee: Marcelo Aparecido Ribeiro de Souza (São Paulo)

Flamengo	Cruzeiro

GK	30	(Brazil) Thiago
RB	2	(Brazil) Rodinei		(substituted off) 59'
CB	15	(Brazil) Réver (c)
CB	4	(Brazil) Juan
LB	21	(Brazil) Pará
CM	5	(Brazil) Willian Arão
CM	8	(Brazil) Márcio Araújo		(substituted off) 66'
RW	28	(Colombia) Orlando Berrío
AM	35	(Brazil) Diego
LW	22	(Brazil) Éverton	(yellow card) 88'
CF	39	(Brazil) Lucas Paquetá		(substituted off) 81'
Substitutes:
GK	38	(Brazil) Alex Muralha
DF	13	(Peru) Miguel Trauco
DF	33	(Brazil) Rafael Vaz
DF	43	(Brazil) Léo Duarte
MF	11	(Argentina) Federico Mancuello
MF	17	(Brazil) Gabriel		(substituted on) 81'
MF	19	(Argentina) Darío Conca
MF	26	(Colombia) Gustavo Cuéllar		(substituted on) 66'
MF	27	(Brazil) Rômulo
MF	42	(Brazil) Matheus Sávio
FW	20	(Brazil) Vinícius Júnior		(substituted on) 59'
Manager:
(Colombia) Reinaldo Rueda

GK	1	(Brazil) Fábio
RB	2	(Brazil) Ezequiel
CB	3	(Brazil) Léo
CB	35	(Brazil) Murilo
LB	6	(Brazil) Diogo Barbosa
CM	8	(Brazil) Henrique (c)
CM	25	(Brazil) Hudson
RW	19	(Brazil) Robinho
AM	30	(Brazil) Thiago Neves		(substituted off) 79'
LW	11	(Brazil) Alisson		(substituted off) 73'
CF	7	(Brazil) Rafael Sóbis	(yellow card) 54'	(substituted off) 58'
Substitutes:
GK	12	(Brazil) Rafael
GK	37	(Brazil) Lucas França
DF	17	(Brazil) Bryan
DF	21	(Brazil) Lennon
DF	32	(Brazil) Arthur
MF	10	(Uruguay) Giorgian De Arrascaeta	(yellow card) 89'	(substituted on) 79'
MF	16	(Brazil) Lucas Silva
MF	23	(Brazil) Élber
MF	29	(Argentina) Lucas Romero
MF	34	(Brazil) Nonoca
MF	70	(Brazil) Rafinha		(substituted on) 73'
FW	36	(Brazil) Raniel	(yellow card) 90+3'	(substituted on) 58'
Manager:
(Brazil) Mano Menezes

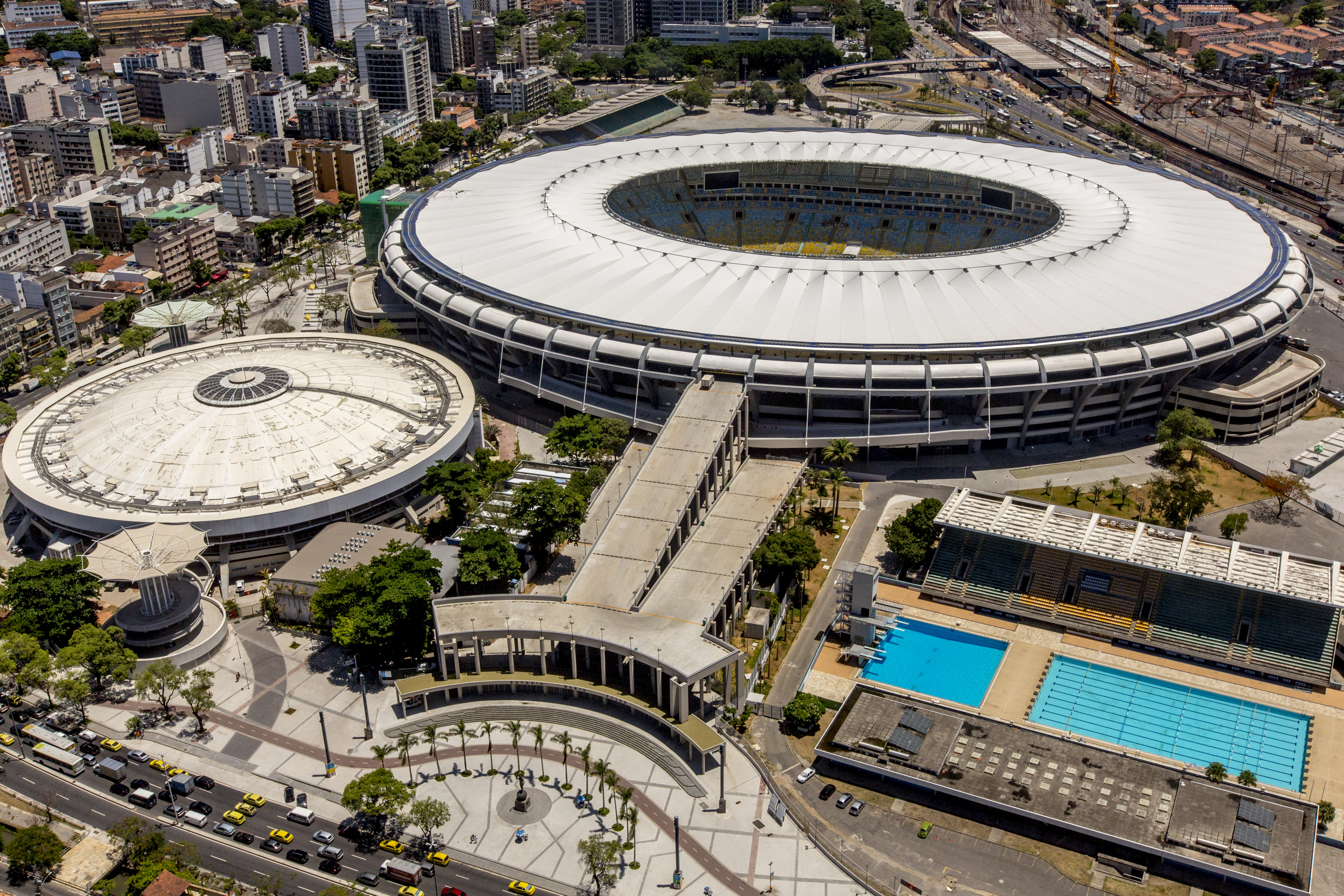
Maracanã in Rio de Janeiro hosted the first leg.

Man of the Match:
(Brazil) Willian Arão (Flamengo)

Assistant referees:
Anderson José de Moraes Coelho (São Paulo)
Bruno Salgado Rizo (São Paulo)
Additional assistant referee:
José Cláudio Rocha Filho (São Paulo)
Ilbert Estevam da Silva (São Paulo)
Fourth official:
Fábio Rogério Baesteiro (São Paulo)

=== Second leg ===
Rafael Sóbis (Cruzeiro), booked in the first leg, and Thiago (Flamengo), scaphoid fracture of the left hand, were ruled out of the second leg. In the second leg, Cruzeiro and Flamengo drew 0–0 at the end of normal time. Tied 1–1 on aggregate, Cruzeiro won on penalties.

27 September 2017
21:45 UTC−3

Cruzeiro (Minas Gerais)	0–0	(Rio de Janeiro (state)) Flamengo
	Report
Penalties
Henrique (penalty scored); Léo (penalty scored); Hudson (penalty scored); Diogo Barbosa (penalty scored); Thiago Neves (penalty scored)	5–3	(penalty scored) Guerrero; (penalty scored) Juan; (penalty missed) Diego; (penalty scored) Trauco

Mineirão, Belo Horizonte
Attendance: 61,017
Referee: Luiz Flávio de Oliveira (São Paulo)

Cruzeiro	Flamengo

GK	1	(Brazil) Fábio
RB	2	(Brazil) Ezequiel	(yellow card) 55'
CB	3	(Brazil) Léo
CB	35	(Brazil) Murilo
LB	6	(Brazil) Diogo Barbosa
CM	8	(Brazil) Henrique (c)
CM	25	(Brazil) Hudson	(yellow card) 80'
RW	19	(Brazil) Robinho		(substituted off) 46'
AM	30	(Brazil) Thiago Neves
LW	11	(Brazil) Alisson		(substituted off) 75'
CF	36	(Brazil) Raniel		(substituted off) 5'
Substitutes:
GK	12	(Brazil) Rafael
GK	37	(Brazil) Lucas França
DF	17	(Brazil) Bryan
DF	21	(Brazil) Lennon
DF	27	(Brazil) Manoel
DF	32	(Brazil) Arthur
MF	10	(Uruguay) Giorgian De Arrascaeta		(substituted on) 5'
MF	16	(Brazil) Lucas Silva
MF	23	(Brazil) Élber		(substituted on) 75'
MF	29	(Argentina) Lucas Romero
MF	34	(Brazil) Nonoca
MF	70	(Brazil) Rafinha		(substituted on) 46'
Manager:
(Brazil) Mano Menezes

GK	38	(Brazil) Alex Muralha
RB	21	(Brazil) Pará	(yellow card) 83'
CB	15	(Brazil) Réver (c)
CB	4	(Brazil) Juan
LB	13	(Peru) Miguel Trauco
CM	5	(Brazil) Willian Arão
CM	26	(Colombia) Gustavo Cuéllar
RW	28	(Colombia) Orlando Berrío		(substituted off) 84'
AM	35	(Brazil) Diego
LW	22	(Brazil) Éverton		(substituted off) 79'
CF	9	(Peru) Paolo Guerrero	(yellow card) 90'
Substitutes:
GK	45	(Brazil) Gabriel Batista
DF	2	(Brazil) Rodinei		(substituted on) 84'
DF	6	(Brazil) Renê
DF	33	(Brazil) Rafael Vaz
DF	43	(Brazil) Léo Duarte
MF	8	(Brazil) Márcio Araújo
MF	11	(Argentina) Federico Mancuello
MF	17	(Brazil) Gabriel
MF	42	(Brazil) Matheus Sávio
FW	20	(Brazil) Vinícius Júnior
FW	39	(Brazil) Lucas Paquetá		(substituted on) 79'
FW	47	(Brazil) Felipe Vizeu
Manager:
(Colombia) Reinaldo Rueda

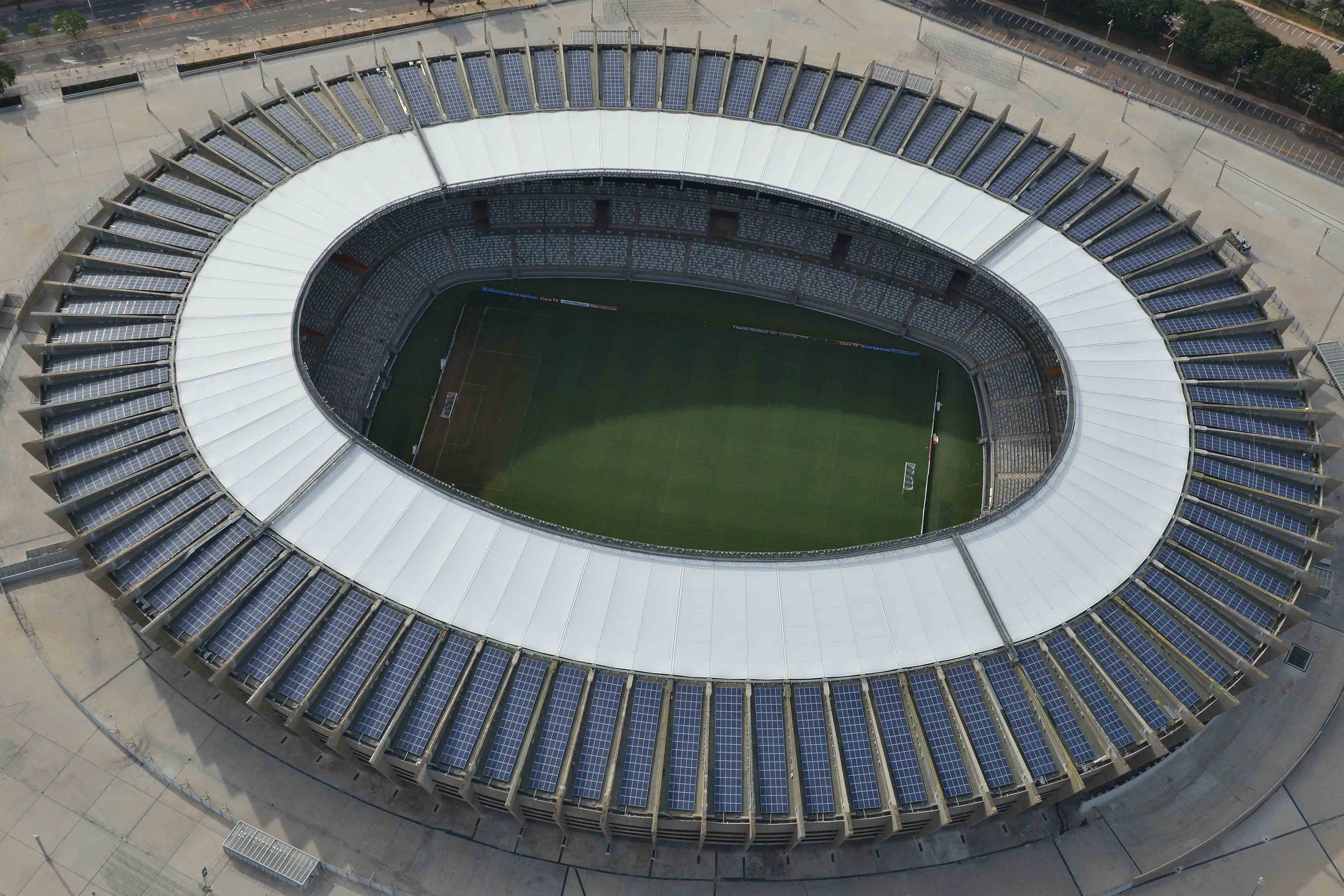
Mineirão in Belo Horizonte hosted the second leg.

Man of the Match:
(Brazil) Juan (Flamengo)

Assistant referees:
Marcelo Carvalho Van Gasse (São Paulo)
Danilo Ricardo Simon Manis (São Paulo)
Additional assistant referee:
José Cláudio Rocha Filho (São Paulo)
Adriano de Assis Miranda (São Paulo)
Fourth official:
Miguel Cataneo Ribeiro da Costa (São Paulo)

== See also ==
- 2017 Campeonato Brasileiro Série A
