= 2018 Copa do Brasil finals =

2018 Copa do Brasil Finals
Cruzeiro	Corinthians
(Minas Gerais)	(São Paulo (state))
3	1
- on aggregate

First leg
Cruzeiro	Corinthians
1	0
- Date: 10 October 2018
- Venue: Mineirão, Belo Horizonte
- Man of the Match: Thiago Neves (Cruzeiro)
- Referee: Anderson Daronco (Rio Grande do Sul)
- Attendance: 53,368

Second leg
Corinthians	Cruzeiro
1	2
- Date: 17 October 2018
- Venue: Arena Corinthians, São Paulo
- Man of the Match: Dedé (Cruzeiro)
- Referee: Wagner do Nascimento Magalhães (Rio de Janeiro)
- Attendance: 46,571

The 2018 Copa do Brasil Finals was the final two-legged tie that decided the 2018 Copa do Brasil, the 30th season of the Copa do Brasil, Brazil's national cup football tournament organised by the Brazilian Football Confederation.

The finals were contested in a two-legged home-and-away format between the defending champions Cruzeiro, from Minas Gerais, and Corinthians, from São Paulo. Cruzeiro and Corinthians reached the Copa do Brasil finals for the eighth and sixth time, respectively.

A draw by CBF was held on 27 September 2018 to determine the home-and-away teams for each leg. The first leg was hosted by Cruzeiro at Mineirão in Belo Horizonte on 10 October 2018, while the second leg was hosted by Corinthians at Arena Corinthians in São Paulo on 17 October 2018.

Cruzeiro defeated Corinthians 3–1 on aggregate in the finals to win their sixth title. As champions, Cruzeiro earned the right to play in the 2019 Copa Libertadores Group stage and the 2019 Copa do Brasil Round of 16. Cruzeiro were the first team to successfully defend the title.

== Teams ==
Team	Previous finals appearances (bold indicates winners)
(Minas Gerais) Cruzeiro	7 (**1993**, **1996**, 1998, **2000**, **2003**, 2014, **2017**)
(São Paulo (state)) Corinthians	5 (**1995**, 2001, **2002**, 2008, **2009**)

=== Road to the final ===
Note: In all scores below, the score of the home team is given first.

(Minas Gerais) Cruzeiro			Round	(São Paulo (state)) Corinthians		
Opponent	Venue	Score		Opponent	Venue	Score
(Paraná (state)) Atlético Paranaense (won 3–2 on aggregate)	Away	1–2	Round of 16	(Bahia) Vitória (won 3–1 on aggregate)	Away	0–0
(Paraná (state)) Atlético Paranaense (won 3–2 on aggregate)	Home	1–1	Round of 16	(Bahia) Vitória (won 3–1 on aggregate)	Home	3–1
(São Paulo (state)) Santos (tied 2–2 on aggregate, won 3–0 on penalties)	Away	0–1	Quarter-finals	(Santa Catarina (state)) Chapecoense (won 2–0 on aggregate)	Home	1–0
(São Paulo (state)) Santos (tied 2–2 on aggregate, won 3–0 on penalties)	Home	1–2	Quarter-finals	(Santa Catarina (state)) Chapecoense (won 2–0 on aggregate)	Away	0–1
(São Paulo (state)) Palmeiras (won 2–1 on aggregate)	Away	0–1	Semi-finals	(Rio de Janeiro (state)) Flamengo (won 2–1 on aggregate)	Away	0–0
(São Paulo (state)) Palmeiras (won 2–1 on aggregate)	Home	1–1	Semi-finals	(Rio de Janeiro (state)) Flamengo (won 2–1 on aggregate)	Home	2–1

== Format ==
In the finals, the teams played a single-elimination tournament with the following rules:

- The finals were played on a home-and-away two-legged basis. The home-and-away teams for both legs were determined by a draw held on 27 September 2018 at the CBF headquarters in Rio de Janeiro, Brazil.
- If tied on aggregate, the away goals rule and extra time would not be used and the penalty shoot-out would be used to determine the winner. (Regulations Article 12.c).

== Matches ==
=== First leg ===
In the second leg of the semi-finals, Douglas (Corinthians) picked up a yellow card and Sassá (Cruzeiro) was sent off which meant they were suspended for the first leg of the Finals. Giorgian De Arrascaeta (Cruzeiro) was called-up for the Uruguay National Team and he could not play the first leg.

A goal from Thiago Neves gave Cruzeiro a 1–0 win over Corinthians in the first leg. The winning goal came after a cross from Egídio headed into the net in the 45th minute by Thiago Neves.

10 October 2018
21:45 UTC−3

Cruzeiro (Minas Gerais)	1–0	(São Paulo (state)) Corinthians
Thiago Neves 45'	Report

Mineirão, Belo Horizonte
Attendance: 53,368
Referee: Anderson Daronco (Rio Grande do Sul)

**Cruzeiro**	**Corinthians**

GK	1	(Brazil) Fábio
RB	22	(Brazil) Edílson
CB	26	(Brazil) Dedé
CB	3	(Brazil) Léo
LB	6	(Brazil) Egídio	(yellow card) 71'
CM	8	(Brazil) Henrique (c)	(yellow card) 77'
CM	5	(Argentina) Ariel Cabral
RW	19	(Brazil) Robinho
AM	30	(Brazil) Thiago Neves	(yellow card) 61'	(substituted off) 81'
LW	18	(Brazil) Rafinha		(substituted off) 88'
CF	28	(Argentina) Hernán Barcos		(substituted off) 75'
Substitutes:
GK	12	(Brazil) Rafael
DF	2	(Brazil) Ezequiel
DF	4	(Brazil) Murilo
DF	25	(Brazil) Marcelo Hermes
MF	16	(Brazil) Lucas Silva
MF	20	(Brazil) Bruno Silva
MF	21	(Argentina) Federico Mancuello
MF	29	(Argentina) Lucas Romero
FW	7	(Brazil) Rafael Sóbis		(substituted on) 88'
FW	9	(Brazil) Fred
FW	11	(Brazil) David		(substituted on) 81'
FW	17	(Brazil) Raniel		(substituted on) 75'
Manager:
(Brazil) Mano Menezes

GK	12	(Brazil) Cássio (c)
RB	23	(Brazil) Fagner
CB	14	(Brazil) Léo Santos	(yellow card) 38'
CB	3	(Brazil) Henrique
LB	35	(Brazil) Danilo Avelar
DM	15	(Brazil) Ralf
DM	5	(Brazil) Gabriel
RW	11	(Paraguay) Ángel Romero
AM	10	(Brazil) Jádson	(yellow card) 42'	(substituted off) 80'
AM	22	(Brazil) Mateus Vital		(substituted off) 66'
LW	25	(Brazil) Clayson		(substituted off) 60'
Substitutes:
GK	27	(Brazil) Walter
DF	13	(Brazil) Marllon
DF	33	(Brazil) Carlos Augusto
DF	34	(Brazil) Pedro Henrique
MF	2	(Brazil) Guilherme Mantuan
MF	16	(Chile) Ángelo Araos	(yellow card) 88' (yellow-red card) 90+2'	(substituted on) 66'
MF	17	(Brazil) Thiaguinho
MF	20	(Brazil) Danilo
MF	38	(Brazil) Pedrinho		(substituted on) 60'
FW	7	(Brazil) Jonathas
FW	21	(Paraguay) Sergio Díaz
FW	47	(Qatar) Emerson Sheik		(substituted on) 80'
Manager:
(Brazil) Jair Ventura

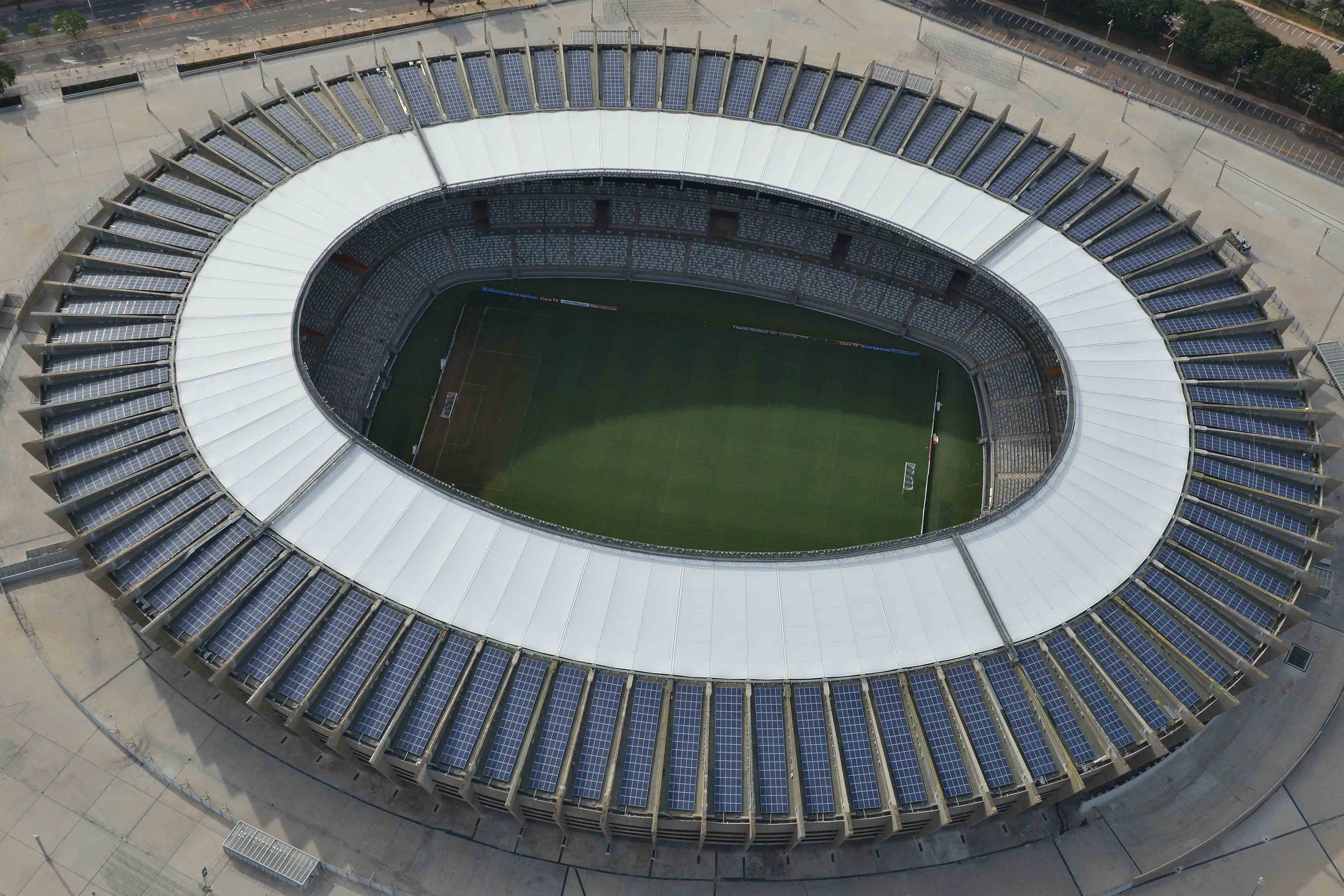
Mineirão in Belo Horizonte hosted the first leg.

Man of the Match:
(Brazil) Thiago Neves (Cruzeiro)

Assistant referees:
Alessandro Álvaro Rocha de Matos (Bahia)
Fabrício Vilarinho da Silva (Goiás)
Fourth official:
Bruno Arleu de Araújo (Rio de Janeiro)
Fifth official:
Rafael da Silva Alves (Rio Grande do Sul)
Video assistant referee:
Wilton Sampaio (Goiás)

=== Second leg ===
Egídio (Cruzeiro), booked in the first leg, Ángelo Araos (Corinthians) sent off in the first leg, and Sassá (Cruzeiro), suspended six games, were ruled out of the second leg.

In the second leg, Cruzeiro defeated Corinthians 1–2 to lift the Copa do Brasil. Robinho scored in the 27th minute after Hernan Barcos' shot off the post. Jádson equalized thanks to a penalty awarded with the help of the VAR after a play between Thiago Neves and Ralf within the Cruzeiro area. The referee, after another VAR review, annulled a goal of Pedrinho due to a foul on Dedé by Jádson. With under 10 minutes left, Giorgian De Arrascaeta scored after a pass from Raniel finishing a counter attack.

17 October 2018
21:45 UTC−3

Corinthians (São Paulo (state))	1–2	(Minas Gerais) Cruzeiro
Jádson 54' (pen.)	Report	Robinho 27'; De Arrascaeta 81'

Arena Corinthians, São Paulo
Attendance: 46,571
Referee: Wagner do Nascimento Magalhães (Rio de Janeiro)

**Corinthians**	**Cruzeiro**

GK	12	(Brazil) Cássio (c)
RB	23	(Brazil) Fagner	(yellow card) 32'
CB	14	(Brazil) Léo Santos
CB	3	(Brazil) Henrique
LB	35	(Brazil) Danilo Avelar
CM	15	(Brazil) Ralf	(yellow card) 8'
CM	5	(Brazil) Gabriel	(yellow card) 19'	(substituted off) 80'
RW	11	(Paraguay) Ángel Romero
AM	10	(Brazil) Jádson	(yellow card) 71'
LW	47	(Qatar) Emerson Sheik	(yellow card) 25'	(substituted off) 77'
CF	7	(Brazil) Jonathas		(substituted off) 67'
Substitutes:
GK	27	(Brazil) Walter
DF	13	(Brazil) Marllon
DF	33	(Brazil) Carlos Augusto
DF	34	(Brazil) Pedro Henrique
DF	37	(Brazil) Vilson
MF	17	(Brazil) Thiaguinho
MF	20	(Brazil) Danilo
MF	22	(Brazil) Mateus Vital		(substituted on) 80'
MF	30	(Brazil) Douglas
MF	38	(Brazil) Pedrinho		(substituted on) 67'
FW	21	(Paraguay) Sergio Díaz
FW	25	(Brazil) Clayson	(yellow card) 86'	(substituted on) 77'
Manager:
(Brazil) Jair Ventura

GK	1	(Brazil) Fábio
RB	22	(Brazil) Edílson
CB	26	(Brazil) Dedé
CB	3	(Brazil) Léo
LB	29	(Argentina) Lucas Romero
CM	8	(Brazil) Henrique (c)
CM	5	(Argentina) Ariel Cabral
RW	19	(Brazil) Robinho	(yellow card) 56'
AM	30	(Brazil) Thiago Neves	(yellow card) 40'	(substituted off) 80'
LW	18	(Brazil) Rafinha	(yellow card) 35'	(substituted off) 67'
CF	28	(Argentina) Hernán Barcos		(substituted off) 73'
Substitutes:
GK	12	(Brazil) Rafael
DF	2	(Brazil) Ezequiel
DF	4	(Brazil) Murilo
DF	14	(Brazil) Cacá
DF	25	(Brazil) Marcelo Hermes
MF	10	(Uruguay) Giorgian De Arrascaeta		(substituted on) 67'
MF	16	(Brazil) Lucas Silva		(substituted on) 80'
MF	20	(Brazil) Bruno Silva
FW	7	(Brazil) Rafael Sóbis
FW	9	(Brazil) Fred
FW	11	(Brazil) David
FW	17	(Brazil) Raniel		(substituted on) 73'
Manager:
(Brazil) Mano Menezes

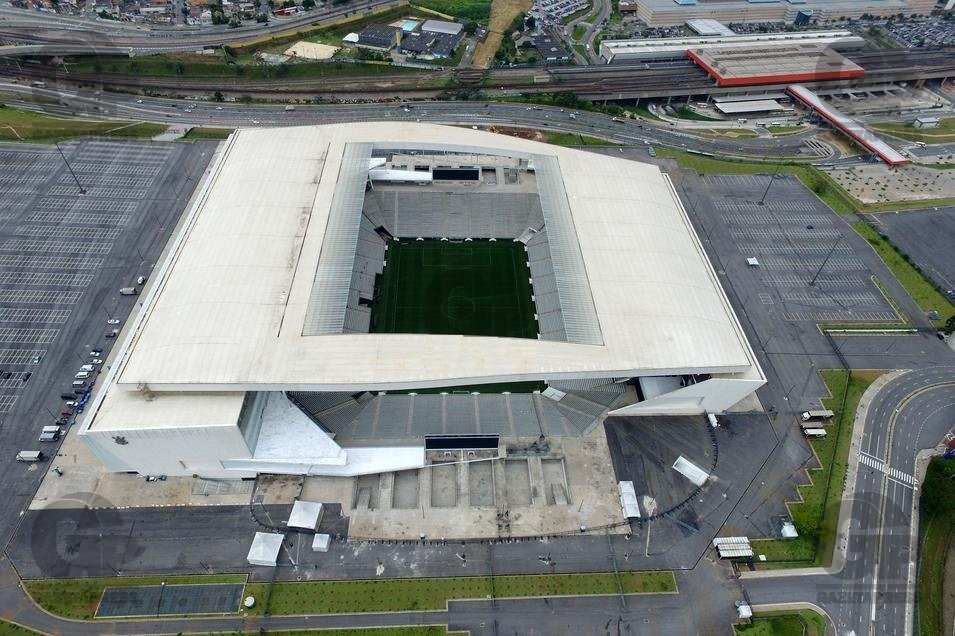
Arena Corinthians in São Paulo hosted the second leg.

Man of the Match:
(Brazil) Dedé (Cruzeiro)

Assistant referees:
Rodrigo Figueiredo Henrique Corrêa (Rio de Janeiro)
Bruno Boschilia (Paraná)
Fourth official:
Jean Pierre Gonçalves Lima (Rio Grande do Sul)
Fifth official:
Luiz Cláudio Regazone (Rio de Janeiro)
Video assistant referee:
Wilton Sampaio (Goiás)

== See also ==
- 2018 Campeonato Brasileiro Série A
