= 2017 Copa do Brasil knockout stage =

The knockout stages of the 2017 Copa do Brasil were played from April 26 to September 27, 2017. A total of 16 teams competed in the knockout stages.

== Format ==
In the knockout stages, the 16 teams played a single-elimination tournament, with the following rules:

- Each tie was played on a home-and-away two-legged basis.
- In the round of 16, quarter-finals, and semi-finals, if tied on aggregate, the away goals rule would be used. If still tied, extra time would not be played, and the penalty shoot-out would be used to determine the winner.
- In the final, if tied on aggregate, the away goals rule and extra time would not be used and the penalty shoot-out would be used to determine the winner.

== Bracket ==
Round of 16
(Paraná (state)) Paraná	3	0	3
(Minas Gerais) Atlético Mineiro	2	2	4
(Rio de Janeiro (state)) Botafogo	2	1	3
(Pernambuco) Sport	1	1	2
(Rio de Janeiro (state)) Flamengo	0	2	2
(Goiás) Atlético Goianiense	0	1	1
(São Paulo (state)) Santos	2	3	5
(Pará) Paysandu	0	1	1
(Rio Grande do Sul) Grêmio	3	2	5
(Rio de Janeiro (state)) Fluminense	1	0	1
(Pernambuco) Santa Cruz	0	0	0
(Paraná (state)) Atlético Paranaense	0	2	2
(São Paulo (state)) Palmeiras (a)	1	1	2
(Rio Grande do Sul) Internacional	0	2	2
(Minas Gerais) Cruzeiro	1	0	1
(Santa Catarina (state)) Chapecoense	0	0	0

Quarter-finals
(Minas Gerais) Atlético Mineiro	1	0	1
(Rio de Janeiro (state)) Botafogo	0	3	3
(Rio de Janeiro (state)) Flamengo (a)	2	2	4
(São Paulo (state)) Santos	0	4	4
(Rio Grande do Sul) Grêmio	4	3	7
(Paraná (state)) Atlético Paranaense	0	2	2
(São Paulo (state)) Palmeiras	3	1	4
(Minas Gerais) Cruzeiro (a)	3	1	4

Semi-finals
(Rio de Janeiro (state)) Botafogo	0	0	0
(Rio de Janeiro (state)) Flamengo	0	1	1
(Rio Grande do Sul) Grêmio	1	0	1 (2)
(Minas Gerais) Cruzeiro (p)	0	1	1 (3)

Final
(Rio de Janeiro (state)) Flamengo	1	0	1 (3)
(Minas Gerais) Cruzeiro (p)	1	0	1 (5)

== Round of 16 ==
A draw by CBF was held on April 20, 2017 to set the matches for the round of 16. The 16 qualified teams were divided in two pots. Teams from pot 1 were the ones who competed at the 2017 Copa Libertadores. Pot 2 was composed of the five teams that qualified through the Fourth Round plus the champions of 2016 Copa Verde, 2016 Copa do Nordeste and 2016 Campeonato Brasileiro Série B.

=== Seeding ===
- 2017 CBF ranking shown in brackets.

Pot 1	Pot 2
(Rio Grande do Sul) Grêmio (1); (São Paulo (state)) Palmeiras (2); (São Paulo (state)) Santos (3); (Minas Gerais) Atlético Mineiro (5); (Rio de Janeiro (state)) Flamengo (9); (Paraná (state)) Atlético Paranaense (11); (Rio de Janeiro (state)) Botafogo (12); (Santa Catarina (state)) Chapecoense (19)	(Minas Gerais) Cruzeiro (6); (Rio Grande do Sul) Internacional (7); (Rio de Janeiro (state)) Fluminense (10); (Pernambuco) Sport (17); (Pernambuco) Santa Cruz (26); (Goiás) Atlético Goianiense (27); (Pará) Paysandu (30); (Paraná (state)) Paraná (33)

=== Matches ===
The first legs were played on April 26 – May 24 and the second legs were played on May 10 – June 1, 2017.

Team 1	Agg.	Team 2	1st leg	2nd leg
Santa Cruz (Pernambuco)	0–2	(Paraná (state)) Atlético Paranaense	0–0	0–2
Grêmio (Rio Grande do Sul)	5–1	(Rio de Janeiro (state)) Fluminense	3–1	2–0
Flamengo (Rio de Janeiro (state))	2–1	(Goiás) Atlético Goianiense	0–0	2–1
Palmeiras (São Paulo (state))	2–2 (a)	(Rio Grande do Sul) Internacional	1–0	1–2
Botafogo (Rio de Janeiro (state))	3–2	(Pernambuco) Sport	2–1	1–1
Santos (São Paulo (state))	5–1	(Pará) Paysandu	2–0	3–1
Cruzeiro (Minas Gerais)	1–0	(Santa Catarina (state)) Chapecoense	1–0	0–0
Paraná (Paraná (state))	3–4	(Minas Gerais) Atlético Mineiro	3–2	0–2

=== Match 76 ===
May 10, 2017
21:45 UTC−03:00

Santa Cruz (Pernambuco)	0–0	(Paraná (state)) Atlético Paranaense
	Report

Estádio do Arruda, Recife
Attendance: 4,030
Referee: Grazianni Maciel Rocha (Rio de Janeiro)

May 31, 2017
19:30 UTC−03:00

Atlético Paranaense (Paraná (state))	2–0	(Pernambuco) Santa Cruz
Nikão 5'; González 68'	Report

Arena da Baixada, Curitiba
Attendance: 16,683
Referee: Elmo Alves Resende Cunha (Goiás)

Atlético Paranaense won 2–0 on aggregate and advanced to the quarter-finals.

=== Match 77 ===
May 17, 2017
21:45 UTC−03:00

Grêmio (Rio Grande do Sul)	3–1	(Rio de Janeiro (state)) Fluminense
Arthur 17'; Barrios 65', 70'	Report	Renato Chaves 5'

Arena do Grêmio, Porto Alegre
Attendance: 22,788
Referee: Dewson Fernando Freitas da Silva (Pará)

May 31, 2017
19:30 UTC−03:00

Fluminense (Rio de Janeiro (state))	0–2	(Rio Grande do Sul) Grêmio
	Report	Luan 17'; Pedro Rocha 28'

Maracanã, Rio de Janeiro
Attendance: 21,172
Referee: Thiago Duarte Peixoto (São Paulo)

Grêmio won 5–1 on aggregate and advanced to the quarter-finals.

=== Match 78 ===
May 10, 2017
19:30 UTC−03:00

Flamengo (Rio de Janeiro (state))	0–0	(Goiás) Atlético Goianiense
	Report

Maracanã, Rio de Janeiro
Attendance: 33,161
Referee: Jean Pierre Gonçalves Lima (Rio Grande do Sul)

May 24, 2017
21:45 UTC−03:00

Atlético Goianiense (Goiás)	1–2	(Rio de Janeiro (state)) Flamengo
Jorginho 27'	Report	Guerrero 12'; Matheus Sávio 79'

Estádio Serra Dourada, Goiânia
Attendance: 14,709
Referee: Flávio Rodrigues de Souza (São Paulo)

Flamengo won 2–1 on aggregate and advanced to the quarter-finals.

=== Match 79 ===
May 17, 2017
21:45 UTC−03:00

Palmeiras (São Paulo (state))	1–0	(Rio Grande do Sul) Internacional
Léo Ortiz 32' (o.g.)	Report

Allianz Parque, São Paulo
Attendance: 31,463
Referee: Sandro Ricci (Santa Catarina)

May 31, 2017
21:45 UTC−03:00

Internacional (Rio Grande do Sul)	2–1	(São Paulo (state)) Palmeiras
D'Alessandro 8'; López 55'	Report	Thiago Santos 79'

Estádio Beira-Rio, Porto Alegre
Attendance: 34,724
Referee: Ricardo Marques (Minas Gerais)

Tied 2–2 on aggregate, Palmeiras won on away goals and advanced to the quarter-finals.

=== Match 80 ===
April 26, 2017
21:45 UTC−03:00

Botafogo (Rio de Janeiro (state))	2–1	(Pernambuco) Sport
Guilherme 56', 82'	Report	Samuel Xavier 8'

Estádio Olímpico Nilton Santos, Rio de Janeiro
Attendance: 12,271
Referee: Bráulio da Silva Machado (Santa Catarina)

May 31, 2017
21:45 UTC−03:00

Sport (Pernambuco)	1–1	(Rio de Janeiro (state)) Botafogo
Durval 67'	Report	Roger 11'

Estádio Ilha do Retiro, Recife
Attendance: 10,385
Referee: Raphael Claus (São Paulo)

Botafogo won 3–2 on aggregate and advanced to the quarter-finals.

=== Match 81 ===
April 26, 2017
19:30 UTC−03:00

Santos (São Paulo (state))	2–0	(Pará) Paysandu
Bruno Henrique 48'; Copete 88'	Report

Estádio Urbano Caldeira, Santos
Attendance: 6,266
Referee: Igor Junio Benevenuto (Minas Gerais)

May 10, 2017
21:45 UTC−03:00

Paysandu (Pará)	1–3	(São Paulo (state)) Santos
Diogo Oliveira 49'	Report	Bruno Henrique 26', 60'; Kayke 78'

Estádio Olímpico do Pará, Belém
Attendance: 13,548
Referee: André Luiz de Freitas Castro (Goiás)

Santos won 5–1 on aggregate and advanced to the quarter-finals.

=== Match 82 ===
May 3, 2017
21:45 UTC−03:00

Cruzeiro (Minas Gerais)	1–0	(Santa Catarina (state)) Chapecoense
Raniel 2'	Report

Mineirão, Belo Horizonte
Attendance: 11,716
Referee: Flávio Rodrigues de Souza (São Paulo)

June 1, 2017
21:30 UTC−03:00

Chapecoense (Santa Catarina (state))	0–0	(Minas Gerais) Cruzeiro
	Report

Arena Condá, Chapecó
Attendance: 6,387
Referee: Péricles Bassols Pegado Cortez (Pernambuco)

Cruzeiro won 1–0 on aggregate and advanced to the quarter-finals.

=== Match 83 ===
May 24, 2017
21:45 UTC−03:00

Paraná (Paraná (state))	3–2	(Minas Gerais) Atlético Mineiro
Guilherme Biteco 19', 73'; Felipe Alves 64'	Report	Elias 8'; Robinho 55'

Estádio Couto Pereira, Curitiba
Attendance: 19,287
Referee: Rodrigo D'Alonso Ferreira (Santa Catarina)

May 31, 2017
21:45 UTC−03:00

Atlético Mineiro (Minas Gerais)	2–0	(Paraná (state)) Paraná
Otero 40'; Fred 66'	Report

Estádio Independência, Belo Horizonte
Attendance: 16,614
Referee: André Luiz de Freitas Castro (Goiás)

Atlético Mineiro won 4–3 on aggregate and advanced to the quarter-finals.

== Quarter-finals ==
A draw by CBF was held on June 5, 2017 to set the matches for the quarter-finals. The 8 qualified teams were in a single pot.

=== Seeding ===
- 2017 CBF ranking shown in brackets.

Pot
- (Rio Grande do Sul) Grêmio (1)
- (São Paulo (state)) Palmeiras (2)
- (São Paulo (state)) Santos (3)
- (Minas Gerais) Atlético Mineiro (5)
- (Minas Gerais) Cruzeiro (6)
- (Rio de Janeiro (state)) Flamengo (9)
- (Paraná (state)) Atlético Paranaense (11)
- (Rio de Janeiro (state)) Botafogo (12)

=== Matches ===
The first legs were played on June 28–29 and the second legs were played on July 26–27, 2017.

Team 1	Agg.	Team 2	1st leg	2nd leg
Atlético Mineiro (Minas Gerais)	1–3	(Rio de Janeiro (state)) Botafogo	1–0	0–3
Flamengo (Rio de Janeiro (state))	4–4 (a)	(São Paulo (state)) Santos	2–0	2–4
Grêmio (Rio Grande do Sul)	7–2	(Paraná (state)) Atlético Paranaense	4–0	3–2
Palmeiras (São Paulo (state))	4–4 (a)	(Minas Gerais) Cruzeiro	3–3	1–1

=== Match 84 ===
June 29, 2017
19:30 UTC−03:00

Atlético Mineiro (Minas Gerais)	1–0	(Rio de Janeiro (state)) Botafogo
Cazares 7'	Report

Estádio Independência, Belo Horizonte
Attendance: 19,871
Referee: Dewson Fernando Freitas da Silva (Pará)

July 26, 2017
19:30 UTC−03:00

Botafogo (Rio de Janeiro (state))	3–0	(Minas Gerais) Atlético Mineiro
Carli 5'; Roger 41'; Gilson 89'	Report

Estádio Olímpico Nilton Santos, Rio de Janeiro
Attendance: 27,266
Referee: Sandro Ricci (Santa Catarina)

Botafogo won 3–1 on aggregate and advanced to the semi-finals.

=== Match 85 ===
June 28, 2017
21:45 UTC−03:00

Flamengo (Rio de Janeiro (state))	2–0	(São Paulo (state)) Santos
Éverton 26'; Cuéllar 87'	Report

Estádio Ilha do Urubu, Rio de Janeiro
Attendance: 15,564
Referee: Ricardo Marques (Minas Gerais)

July 26, 2017
21:45 UTC−03:00

Santos (São Paulo (state))	4–2	(Rio de Janeiro (state)) Flamengo
Bruno Henrique 33'; Copete 53', 90+3'; Victor Ferraz 54'	Report	Berrío 9'; Guerrero 46'

Estádio Urbano Caldeira, Santos
Attendance: 12,507
Referee: Leandro Vuaden (Rio Grande do Sul)

Tied 4–4 on aggregate, Flamengo won on away goals and advanced to the semi-finals.

=== Match 86 ===
June 28, 2017
19:30 UTC−03:00

Grêmio (Rio Grande do Sul)	4–0	(Paraná (state)) Atlético Paranaense
Barrios 22', 29'; Kannemann 32'; Everton 86'	Report

Arena do Grêmio, Porto Alegre
Attendance: 28,138
Referee: Flávio Rodrigues de Souza (São Paulo)

July 27, 2017
21:45 UTC−03:00

Atlético Paranaense (Paraná (state))	2–3	(Rio Grande do Sul) Grêmio
Pablo 15'; Felipe Gedoz 90+1'	Report	Pedro Rocha 26', 79'; Everton 69'

Arena da Baixada, Curitiba
Attendance: 14,046
Referee: Raphael Claus (São Paulo)

Grêmio won 7–2 on aggregate and advanced to the semi-finals.

=== Match 87 ===
June 28, 2017
21:45 UTC−03:00

Palmeiras (São Paulo (state))	3–3	(Minas Gerais) Cruzeiro
Dudu 51', 60'; Willian 64'	Report	Thiago Neves 6'; Robinho 19'; Alisson 30'

Allianz Parque, São Paulo
Attendance: 32,067
Referee: Jaílson Macêdo Freitas (Bahia)

July 26, 2017
21:45 UTC−03:00

Cruzeiro (Minas Gerais)	1–1	(São Paulo (state)) Palmeiras
Diogo Barbosa 84'	Report	Keno 70'

Mineirão, Belo Horizonte
Attendance: 44,842
Referee: Wilton Sampaio (Goiás)

Tied 4–4 on aggregate, Cruzeiro won on away goals and advanced to the semi-finals.

== Semi-finals ==
=== Matches ===
A draw by CBF was held on July 31, 2017 to determine the home-and-away teams for both legs. The first legs were played on August 16 and the second legs were played on August 23, 2017.

Team 1	Agg.	Team 2	1st leg	2nd leg
Botafogo (Rio de Janeiro (state))	0–1	(Rio de Janeiro (state)) Flamengo	0–0	0–1
Grêmio (Rio Grande do Sul)	1–1 (2–3 p)	(Minas Gerais) Cruzeiro	1–0	0–1

=== Match 88 ===
August 16, 2017
21:45 UTC−03:00

Botafogo (Rio de Janeiro (state))	0–0	(Rio de Janeiro (state)) Flamengo
	Report

Estádio Olímpico Nilton Santos, Rio de Janeiro
Attendance: 28,757
Referee: Anderson Daronco (Rio Grande do Sul)

August 23, 2017
21:45 UTC−03:00

Flamengo (Rio de Janeiro (state))	1–0	(Rio de Janeiro (state)) Botafogo
Diego 70'	Report

Maracanã, Rio de Janeiro
Attendance: 53,148
Referee: Wilton Sampaio (Goiás)

Flamengo won 1–0 on aggregate and advanced to the final.

=== Match 89 ===
August 16, 2017
21:45 UTC−03:00

Grêmio (Rio Grande do Sul)	1–0	(Minas Gerais) Cruzeiro
Barrios 45'	Report

Arena do Grêmio, Porto Alegre
Attendance: 45,102
Referee: Marcelo Aparecido Ribeiro de Souza (São Paulo)

August 23, 2017
21:45 UTC−03:00

Cruzeiro (Minas Gerais)	1–0	(Rio Grande do Sul) Grêmio
Hudson 52'	Report
Penalties
Rafael Sóbis (penalty scored); Robinho (penalty missed); Murilo Cerqueira (penalty missed); Raniel (penalty scored); Thiago Neves (penalty scored)	3–2	(penalty scored) Fernandinho; (penalty missed) Edílson; (penalty missed) Éverton; (penalty scored) Arthur; (penalty missed) Luan

Mineirão, Belo Horizonte
Attendance: 55,227
Referee: Wagner do Nascimento Magalhães (Rio de Janeiro)

Tied 1–1 on aggregate, Cruzeiro won on penalties and advanced to the final.

== Final ==
In the final, if tied on aggregate, the away goals rule and extra time would not be used and the penalty shoot-out would be used to determine the winner. (Regulations Article 12.c). A draw by CBF was held on August 24, 2017 to determine the home-and-away team for each leg. The first leg was played on September 7 and the second leg was played on September 27, 2017.

Team 1	Agg.	Team 2	1st leg	2nd leg
Flamengo (Rio de Janeiro (state))	1–1 (3–5 p)	(Minas Gerais) Cruzeiro	1–1	0–0

=== Match 90 ===
September 7, 2017
21:45 UTC−03:00

Flamengo (Rio de Janeiro (state))	1–1	(Minas Gerais) Cruzeiro
Lucas Paquetá 75'	Report	De Arrascaeta 83'

Maracanã, Rio de Janeiro
Attendance: 66,165
Referee: Marcelo Aparecido Ribeiro de Souza (São Paulo)

September 27, 2017
21:45 UTC−03:00

Cruzeiro (Minas Gerais)	0–0	(Rio de Janeiro (state)) Flamengo
	Report
Penalties
Henrique (penalty scored); Léo (penalty scored); Hudson (penalty scored); Diogo Barbosa (penalty scored); Thiago Neves (penalty scored)	5–3	(penalty scored) Guerrero; (penalty scored) Juan; (penalty missed) Diego; (penalty scored) Trauco

Mineirão, Belo Horizonte
Attendance: 61,017
Referee: Luiz Flávio de Oliveira (São Paulo)
