= Giorgian de Arrascaeta =

Uruguayan footballer (born 1994)

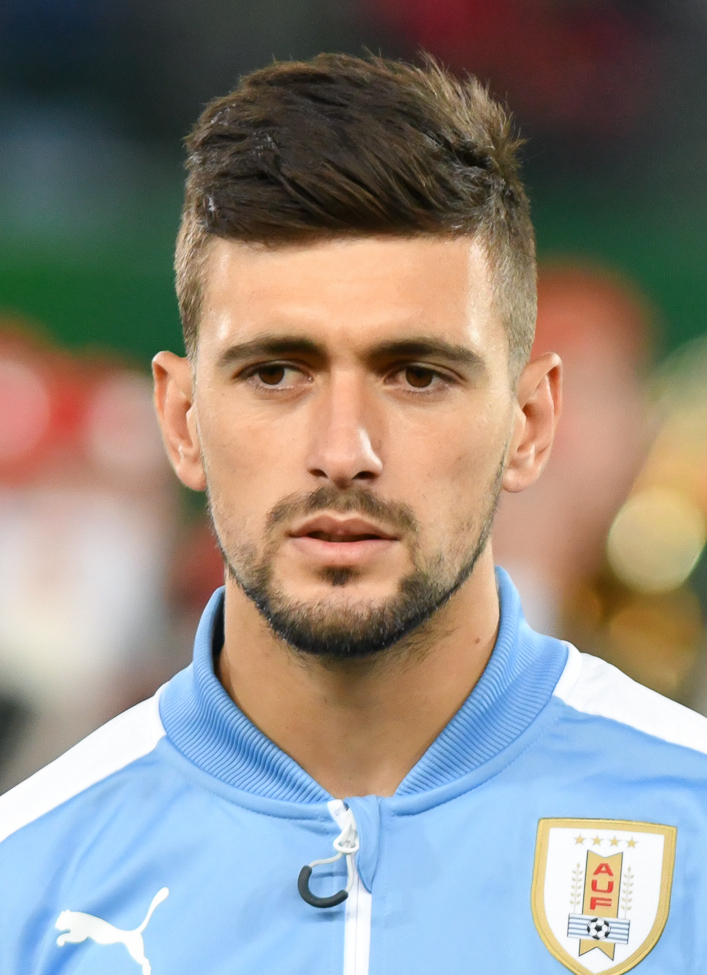
- De Arrascaeta lining up for Uruguay in 2017

Personal information
- Full name: Giorgian Daniel de Arrascaeta Benedetti
- Date of birth: 1 June 1994 (age 32)
- Place of birth: Nuevo Berlín, Uruguay
- Height: 1.74 m (5 ft 9 in)
- Position: Attacking midfielder

Team information
- Current team: Flamengo
- Number: 10

Youth career
- 2007–2012: Defensor Sporting

Senior career*
Years	Team	Apps	(Gls)
2012–2014	Defensor Sporting	53	(16)
2015–2018	Cruzeiro	136	(38)
2019–	Flamengo	266	(78)

International career^{‡}
2012–2013	Uruguay U20	23	(4)
2014–	Uruguay	63	(14)
Medal record
Representing Uruguay
Men's Football
Copa América
Third place	2024 United States
FIFA U-20 World Cup
Runner-up	2013 Turkey
South American U-20 Championship
Third place	2013 Argentina
- * Club domestic league appearances and goals as of 21 November 2026 ‡ National team caps and goals as of 14 November 2026

Giorgian Daniel de Arrascaeta Benedetti (born 1 June 1994) is a Uruguayan professional footballer who plays as an attacking midfielder for Campeonato Brasileiro Série A club Flamengo and the Uruguay national team.

He started his career in Uruguay with Defensor Sporting, making his professional debut in 2012. He then joined Brazilian club Cruzeiro in 2015. After three seasons there, he joined Flamengo, where he has won the Série A three times and the Copa Libertadores three times. For 2025, he was named the South American Footballer of the Year and the best player of the Copa Libertadores. He has also been named in the South American Team of the Year four times and the Série A Team of the Year four times.

After appearing for Uruguay at under-20 level, Arrascaeta made his debut for senior team in 2014. He has since represented his nation at four Copa Américas between 2015 and 2024, as well as three successive FIFA World Cups between 2018 and 2026.

== Club career ==
=== Defensor Sporting ===
Arrascaeta debuted for Defensor Sporting in the Uruguayan Primera División in October 2012, four months after his 18th birthday. He was a member of the team as it won the 2013 Clausura championship, and played in the Championship play-off, a 3–1 loss to Peñarol.

=== Cruzeiro ===
Arrascaeta's performances for Defensor in its run to the semi-finals of the 2014 Copa Libertadores attracted the Brazilian champions Cruzeiro. On 17 January 2015 Cruzeiro secured de Arrascaeta signing by agreeing to pay €4 million (R$12 million) to acquire 50% of his economic rights.

In Cruzeiro, Arrascaeta formed a midfield strong, which became known as "La Banda", along with Lucas Romero and Ariel Cabral. This trio, along with fellow stars Thiago Neves and Robinho helped Cruzeiro to conquer the 2017 Copa do Brasil, the 2018 Campeonato Mineiro, and 2018 Copa do Brasil, with Arrascaeta scoring decisive goals in all three finals.

On 4 February 2018 Cruzeiro won 1–0 against América Mineiro at Mineirão, in a 2018 Campeonato Mineiro match. Arrascaeta scored the only goal of the match with a volley kick, later that year he received his first nomination to the FIFA Puskás Award for that goal.

=== Flamengo ===
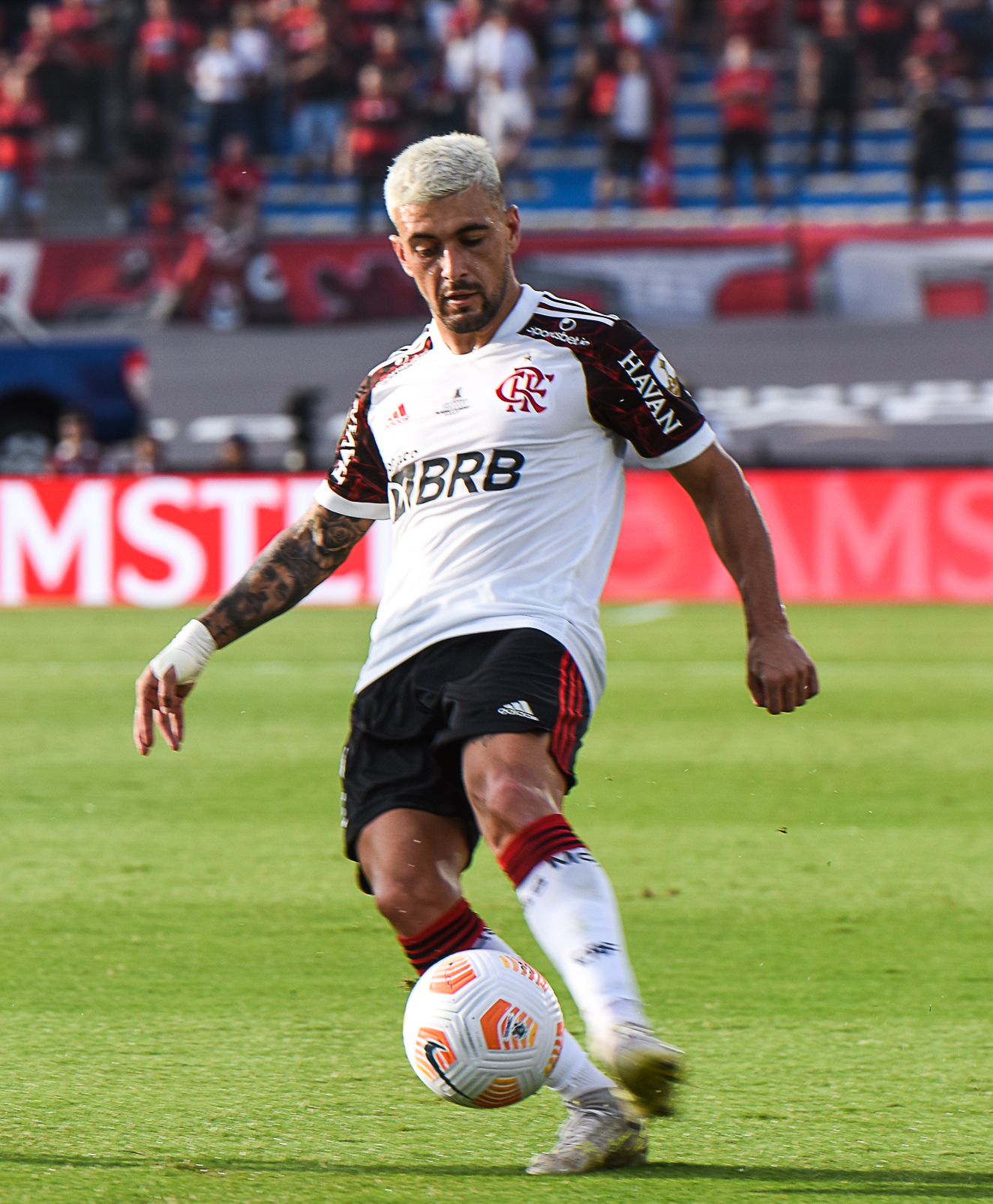
Giorgian de Arrascaeta playing for Flamengo in the 2021 Copa Libertadores final.

During 2019 preseason Flamengo began to show interest in de Arrascaeta. On 3 January 2019, he didn't show up on training sessions after the summer break trying to force his exit from Cruzeiro. Claiming to receive thousands of insults, on 7 January 2019, Cruzeiro's and Flamengo's representatives went to Uruguay to resolve the problem: on 8 January, the transfer was completed for a record €15million, or R$63 million, the biggest transfer in Brazilian football history. On 12 January he was announced as a new player, becoming Flamengo's biggest transfer fee paid at that time, signing a five-year deal.

Against Goiás in the second match under Jorge Jesus management de Arrascaeta scored a hat trick, with all of his goals scored in the first half, in the 6–1 win at Maracanã Stadium on 14 July 2019.

On 25 August 2019, de Arrascaeta scored with a bicycle kick, after a Rafinha cross, in a 3–0 win against Ceará at Castelão. With that goal he won the 2019 Campeonato Brasileiro Série A goal of the season award and also has been nominated to the FIFA Puskás Award for the second time in his career.

On 23 November 2019, de Arrascaeta assisted Gabriel Barbosa on Flamengo's first goal in the 2019 Copa Libertadores Final against the River Plate, that the Flamengo won 2–1. Less than 24 hours later, Flamengo became champions of the 2019 Campeonato Brasileiro Série A, with de Arrascaeta scoring 13 goals and giving 14 assists. On 25 February 2022, de Arrascaeta extended his contract with Flamengo until 31 December 2026. de Arrascaeta finished the 2022 season in high level, as champion of the Copa Libertadores 2022 and the Copa do Brasil 2022 e being named to Campeonato Brasileiro Série A Team of the Year for the second time in his career and to the Bola de Prata for the third time. On 28 February 2023, the second leg of the 2023 Recopa Sudamericana was played at the Maracanã Stadium with a season record attendance of 71,411. Flamengo won 1–0, de Arrascaeta scored the winning goal on the last play of the match on the 96th minute. The score forced extra time which remained scoreless. Ironically de Arrascaeta missed the only penalty kick in the shootout as Independiente del Valle won 5–4 and lifted the trophy for the first time. On 22 July, in a 1–1 draw against América Mineiro, de Arrascaeta became the first foreign player in Flamengo's history to reach 100 Campeonato Brasileiro Série A matches.

On 17 August 2025, de Arrascaeta reached the historic milestone of 100 assists with the Flamengo jersey. The number 10 gave two assists in the 3–1 victory against Internacional, at Beira-Rio, in the Série A.

== International career ==
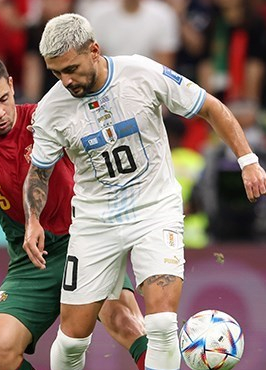
Giorgian de Arrascaeta playing for Uruguay at the 2022 FIFA World Cup.

After scoring twice for Uruguay as they finished runners-up at the 2013 FIFA U-20 World Cup, de Arrascaeta made his debut for the Uruguay senior team in a friendly match against South Korea in September 2014. He assisted the only goal of the game, scored by José Giménez, in the 1–0 win in Goyang.

De Arrascaeta was included in Uruguay's squad for the 2015 Copa América by coach Óscar Tabárez. He was assigned the prestigious number 10 shirt, previously worn by national team legend Diego Forlán. On 6 June 2015, de Arrascaeta scored his first senior international goal during a 5–1 pre-tournament friendly win over Guatemala in Montevideo. De Arrascaeta made his tournament debut as a 64th-minute substitute as Uruguay defeated Jamaica 1–0 in their opening group match on 13 June. In May 2018 he was named in Uruguay's provisional 26-man squad for the 2018 FIFA World Cup in Russia.

On 10 June 2021, de Arrascaeta was confirmed in the Uruguay 2021 Copa América final squad.

On 2 December 2022, de Arrascaeta scored both goals in a 2–0 victory over Ghana, in the last match of group stage in the 2022 FIFA World Cup in Qatar. This was not enough to qualify Uruguay to the knockout stage as South Korea won 2–1 against Portugal, advancing from the group stage on four goals scored in the group stage compared to Uruguay's two.

On 31 May 2026, de Arrascaeta was named in Uruguay's 26-man squad for the 2026 FIFA World Cup.

== Personal life ==
Arrascaeta is Roman Catholic, married to his wife in a religious cerimony and baptized his son as Catholic. He is of Basque and Italian descent. In December 2025, his first son was born.

== Career statistics ==
=== Club ===
As of match played 21 November 2026

Appearances and goals by club, season and competition
Club	Season	League			State league (Note: Includes Campeonato Mineiro, Campeonato Carioca)		National cup (Note: Includes Copa do Brasil)		Continental		Other		Total	
Club	Season	Division	Apps	Goals	Apps	Goals	Apps	Goals	Apps	Goals	Apps	Goals	Apps	Goals
Defensor	2012–13	Liga AUF Uruguaya	16	3	—		—		0	0	—		16	3
Defensor	2013–14	Liga AUF Uruguaya	26	7	—		—		12 (Note: Appearances in Copa Libertadores)	2	—		38	9
Defensor	2014–15	Liga AUF Uruguaya	11	6	—		—		0	0	—		11	6
Defensor	Total		53	16	—		—		12	2	—		65	18
Cruzeiro	2015	Série A	23	4	8	4	2	0	10	1	—		43	9
Cruzeiro	2016	Série A	31	9	10	2	9	2	0	0	2 (Note: Appearances in Primeira Liga)	1	52	14
Cruzeiro	2017	Série A	16	3	15	6	10	2	2 (Note: Appearances in Copa Sudamericana)	0	—		43	11
Cruzeiro	2018	Série A	20	6	13	4	6	2	9	3	—		48	15
Cruzeiro	Total		90	22	46	16	27	6	21	4	2	1	186	49
Flamengo	2019	Série A	23	13	13	3	3	0	11	1	2 (Note: Appearances in FIFA Club World Cup)	1	52	18
Flamengo	2020	Série A	28	8	10	2	2	0	7	1	3 (Note: Two appearances in Recopa Sudamericana, one appearance and one goal in Supercopa do Brasil)	1	50	12
Flamengo	2021	Série A	14	1	6	2	2	1	12	4	1 (Note: Appearance in Supercopa do Brasil)	1	35	9
Flamengo	2022	Série A	24	3	11	5	9	3	11	2	1	0	56	13
Flamengo	2023	Série A	28	7	9	1	7	2	5	0	5 (Note: One appearance in Supercopa do Brasil, two appearances in FIFA Club World Cup, two appearances and one goal in Recopa Sudamericana)	1	54	11
Flamengo	2024	Série A	15	5	13	3	8	2	7	0	—		43	10
Flamengo	2025	Série A	33	18	10	2	2	0	11	2	7 (Note: One appearance in Supercopa do Brasil, four appearances and one goal in FIFA Club World Cup, three appearances and two goals in FIFA Intercontinental Cup)	3	64	25
Flamengo	2026	Série A	26	4	3	1	1	0	8	4	3 (Note: one appearance in Supercopa do Brasil, two appearances and one goal in Recopa Sudamericana)	1	41	10
Flamengo	Total		191	59	75	19	34	8	72	14	22	8	395	108
Career total			334	97	121	35	57	13	102	20	24	9	646	175

=== International ===
As of match played 13 November 2026

Appearances and goals by national team and year
National team	Year	Apps	Goals
Uruguay	2014	3	0
Uruguay	2015	4	1
Uruguay	2016	0	0
Uruguay	2017	5	0
Uruguay	2018	6	1
Uruguay	2019	7	1
Uruguay	2020	1	0
Uruguay	2021	8	3
Uruguay	2022	8	4
Uruguay	2023	2	0
Uruguay	2024	9	0
Uruguay	2025	5	3
Uruguay	2026	5	1
Total		63	14

Scores and results list Uruguay's goal tally first, score column indicates score after each Arrascaeta goal.

List of international goals scored by Giorgian de Arrascaeta
No.	Date	Venue	Cap	Opponent	Score	Result	Competition
1	6 June 2015	Estadio Centenario, Montevideo, Uruguay	5	Guatemala	4–0	5–1	Friendly
2	7 June 2018	Estadio Centenario, Montevideo, Uruguay	14	Uzbekistan	1–0	3–0	Friendly
3	6 September 2019	Estadio Nacional de Costa Rica, San José, Costa Rica	24	Costa Rica	1–0	2–1	Friendly
4	2 September 2021	Estadio Nacional, Lima, Peru	31	Peru	1–1	1–1	2022 FIFA World Cup qualification
5	5 September 2021	Estadio Campeón del Siglo, Montevideo, Uruguay	32	Bolivia	1–0	4–2	2022 FIFA World Cup qualification
6	5 September 2021	Estadio Campeón del Siglo, Montevideo, Uruguay	32	Bolivia	4–1	4–2	2022 FIFA World Cup qualification
7	1 February 2022	Estadio Centenario, Montevideo, Uruguay	35	Venezuela	2–0	4–1	2022 FIFA World Cup qualification
8	24 March 2022	Estadio Centenario, Montevideo, Uruguay	36	Peru	1–0	1–0	2022 FIFA World Cup qualification
9	2 December 2022	Al Janoub Stadium, Al-Wakrah, Qatar	42	Ghana	1–0	2–0	2022 FIFA World Cup
10	2 December 2022	Al Janoub Stadium, Al-Wakrah, Qatar	42	Ghana	2–0	2–0	2022 FIFA World Cup
11	10 June 2025	Estadio Centenario, Montevideo, Uruguay	56	Venezuela	2–0	2–0	2026 FIFA World Cup qualification
12	4 September 2025	Estadio Centenario, Montevideo, Uruguay	57	Peru	3–0	3–0	2026 FIFA World Cup qualification
13	18 November 2025	Raymond James Stadium, Tampa, United States	58	United States	1–4	1–5	Friendly
14	28 September 2026	Seoul World Cup Stadium, Seoul, South Korea	62	South Korea	2–0	4–1	Friendly

== Honours ==
Defensor

- Uruguayan Primera División: 2012–13 Clausura

Cruzeiro

- Copa do Brasil: 2017, 2018
- Campeonato Mineiro: 2018

Flamengo

- FIFA Challenger Cup: 2025
- FIFA Derby of the Americas: 2025
- Copa Libertadores: 2019, 2022, 2025
- Recopa Sudamericana: 2020
- Campeonato Brasileiro Série A: 2019, 2020, 2025, 2026
- Copa do Brasil: 2022, 2024
- Supercopa do Brasil: 2020, 2021, 2025
- Campeonato Carioca: 2019, 2020, 2021, 2024, 2025, 2026

Individual

- Uruguayan Primera División Team of the Year: 2013–14
- Troféu EFE Brasil: 2016
- Troféu Mesa Redonda Team of the Year: 2020 2022, 2025
- Troféu Mesa Redonda Best Player: 2025
- Campeonato Mineiro Team of the Year: 2015, 2017
- Campeonato Carioca Team of the Year: 2021, 2022,2024
- Campeonato Carioca Best Player: 2022,2024
- Copa do Brasil Goal of the Year: 2018
- Copa do Brasil Team of the Season: 2023, 2024
- Copa do Brasil Golden Ball: 2022
- Campeonato Brasileiro Série A Top assist provider: 2019, 2020, 2025
- Campeonato Brasileiro Série A Goal of the Year: 2019
- Campeonato Brasileiro Série A Team of the Year: 2018, 2019, 2022, 2025
- Bola de Prata: 2019, 2020, 2022, 2023, 2025
- Bola de Ouro: 2025
- Supercopa do Brasil Best Player: 2021
- Copa Libertadores Team of the Tournament: 2021, 2022, 2025
- Copa Libertadores Hero of the Tournament: 2025
- South American Team of the Year: 2019, 2021, 2022, 2025
- South American Footballer of the Year: 2025
- IFFHS Men's CONMEBOL Team: 2025
