= John Lennon (footballer) =

Brazilian footballer (born 1991)

Lennon
Personal information
- Full name: Joáo Lennon Silva Santos
- Date of birth: 29 December 1991 (age 34)
- Place of birth: Araguaína, Brazil
- Height: 1.78 m (5 ft 10 in)
- Position: Right back

Team information
- Current team: Caxias

Senior career*
Years	Team	Apps	(Gls)
2008	Inhumas		
2009	Madureira		
2010–2012	Vila Nova	14	(0)
2011	→ Inhumas (loan)		
2011	→ Anápolis (loan)		
2012–2015	Botafogo	8	(0)
2013	→ Atlético Goianiense (loan)	24	(1)
2016	Glória	12	(1)
2016	Sergipe	6	(0)
2017	Cruzeiro-RS	13	(0)
2017	Cruzeiro	4	(0)
2018	CSA	0	(0)
2019	Pelotas	0	(0)
2019–2020	Juventude	33	(3)
2020	Vila Nova	19	(0)
2021–	Caxias	1	(0)
- * Club domestic league appearances and goals as of 17:59, 12 June 2019 (UTC)

John Lennon Silva Santos (born 29 December 1991), known as John Lennon or simply Lennon, is a Brazilian professional footballer who plays for Caxias as a right back.
