= Murilo Cerqueira =

Brazilian footballer (born 1997)

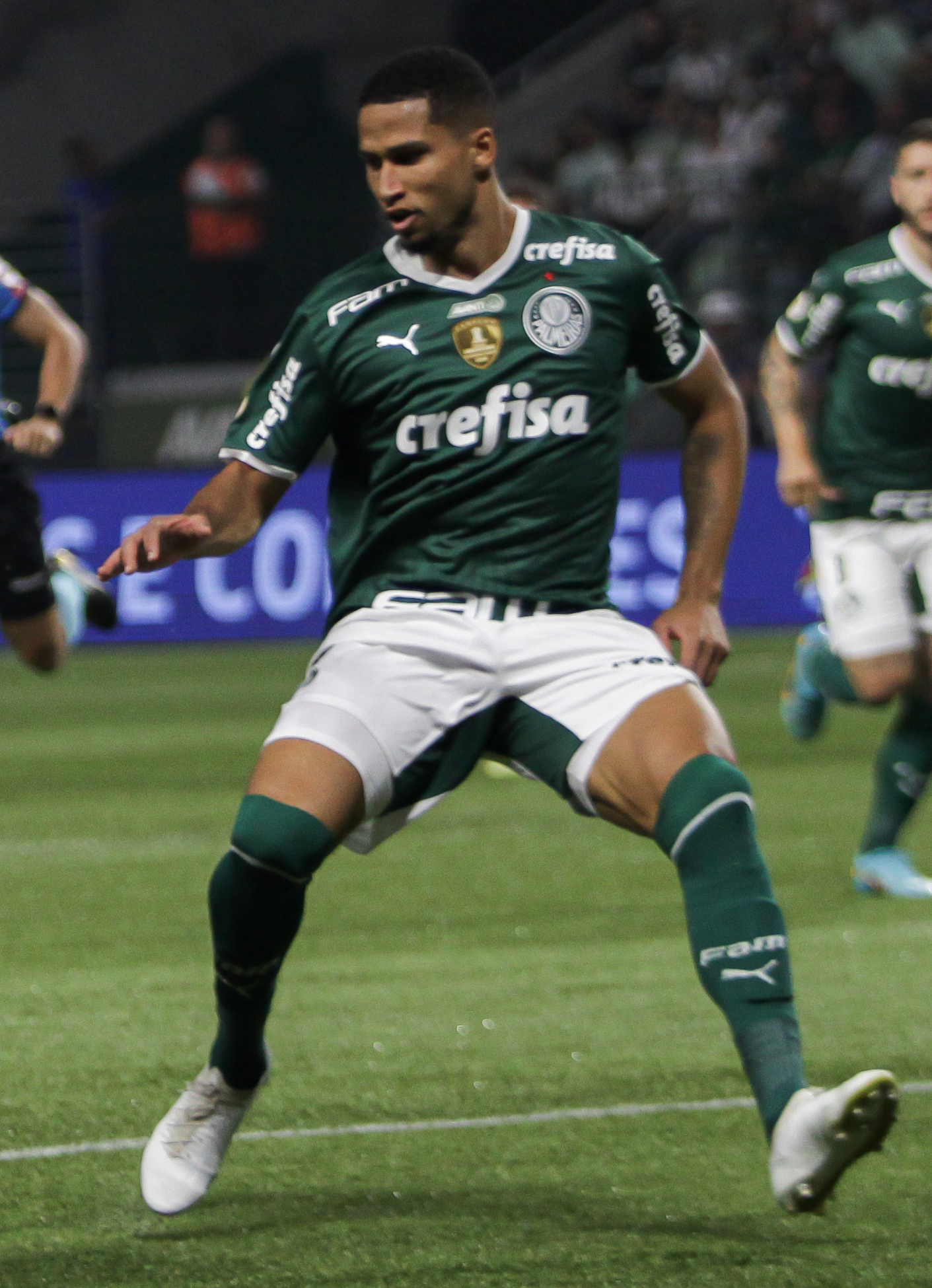
- Murilo playing for Palmeiras in 2022

Personal information
- Full name: Murilo Cerqueira Paim
- Date of birth: 27 March 1997 (age 29)
- Place of birth: São Gonçalo dos Campos, Brazil
- Height: 1.88 m (6 ft 2 in)
- Position: Centre-back

Team information
- Current team: Palmeiras
- Number: 26

Youth career
- 2012–2016: Cruzeiro

Senior career*
| Years | Team | Apps | (Gls) |
| 2017–2019 | Cruzeiro | 50 | (0) |
| 2019–2022 | Lokomotiv Moscow | 52 | (4) |
| 2022– | Palmeiras | 170 | (17) |

International career^{‡}
| 2016 | Brazil U20 | 3 | (2) |
| 2019–2020 | Brazil U23 | 5 | (0) |
- * Club domestic league appearances and goals as of 7 April 2026 ‡ National team caps and goals as of 17 November 2020

Murilo Cerqueira Paim (born 27 March 1997) is a Brazilian professional footballer who plays as a centre-back or defensive midfielder for Brazilian club Palmeiras.

== Club career ==
=== Cruzeiro ===
Cerqueira played for the Cruzeiro Youth Teams since 2012. In 2017, he was promoted to the senior team. On March 21, 2017 he made his professional debut for Cruzeiro in the match against Joinville Esporte Clube at the Primeira Liga.

=== Lokomotiv ===
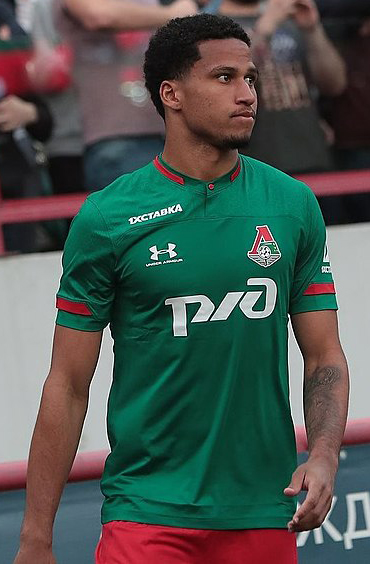
Murilo with Lokomotiv Moscow in 2019

On 18 June 2019, Murilo signed a 5-year contract with the Russian Premier League club FC Lokomotiv Moscow. On 12 May 2021, he scored the last goal in a 3–1 victory over PFC Krylia Sovetov Samara in the 2020–21 Russian Cup final.

=== Palmeiras ===
On 12 January 2022, Cerqueira signed a five-season contract with Série A club Palmeiras.

== International career ==
Cerqueira represented Brazil U20 at youth level. He was one of the sparring players for the Brazil 2016 Olympic team. He was also part of the Brazil U-23 team which won the 2019 Toulon Tournament. He was present for the 2020 Summer Olympics qualifying cycle, but ended up not being called up to the final list for the tournament.

He was called up for the first time to the senior Brazil national team in March 2024 for friendlies against England and Spain, but remained on the bench in both games.

== Career statistics ==
=== Club ===
As of match played 4 December 2025

Appearances and goals by club, season and competition
| Club | Season | League | | | State league | | National cup (Note: Includes Copa do Brasil and Russian Cup) | | Continental | | Other | | Total | |
| Club | Season | Division | Apps | Goals | Apps | Goals | Apps | Goals | Apps | Goals | Apps | Goals | Apps | Goals |
|---|---|---|---|---|---|---|---|---|---|---|---|---|---|---|
| Cruzeiro | 2017 | Série A | 24 | 0 | 0 | 0 | 5 | 0 | 0 | 0 | 2 (Note: Appearance(s) in Primeira Liga) | 0 | 31 | 0 |
| Cruzeiro | 2018 | Série A | 9 | 0 | 10 (Note: Appearance(s) in Campeonato Mineiro) | 0 | 0 | 0 | 1 (Note: Appearance(s) in Copa Libertadores) | 0 | — | | 20 | 0 |
| Cruzeiro | 2019 | Série A | 1 | 0 | 4 | 0 | 0 | 0 | 1 | 0 | — | | 6 | 0 |
| Cruzeiro | Total | | 34 | 0 | 14 | 0 | 5 | 0 | 2 | 0 | 2 | 0 | 57 | 0' |
| Lokomotiv Moscow | 2019–20 | Russian Premier League | 25 | 0 | — | | 1 | 0 | 5 (Note: Appearance(s) in UEFA Champions League) | 0 | 1 (Note: Appearance(s) in Russian Super Cup) | 0 | 32 | 0 |
| Lokomotiv Moscow | 2020–21 | Russian Premier League | 22 | 4 | — | | 2 | 1 | 5 | 0 | 1 | 0 | 30 | 5 |
| Lokomotiv Moscow | 2021–22 | Russian Premier League | 5 | 0 | — | | 0 | 0 | 3 (Note: Appearance(s) in UEFA Europa League) | 0 | 1 | 0 | 9 | 0 |
| Lokomotiv Moscow | Total | | 52 | 4 | — | | 3 | 1 | 13 | 0 | 3 | 0 | 71 | 5 |
| Palmeiras | 2022 | Série A | 32 | 4 | 11 (Note: Appearance(s) in Campeonato Paulista) | 3 | 4 | 0 | 8 | 3 | 2 (Note: Appearance(s) in Recopa Sudamericana) | 0 | 57 | 10 |
| Palmeiras | 2023 | Série A | 25 | 3 | 14 | 2 | 2 | 0 | 7 | 0 | 1 (Note: Appearance(s) in Supercopa do Brasil) | 0 | 49 | 5 |
| Palmeiras | 2024 | Série A | 25 | 1 | 14 | 1 | 3 | 0 | 5 | 0 | 1 | 0 | 48 | 2 |
| Palmeiras | 2025 | Série A | 20 | 1 | 13 | 0 | 0 | 0 | 9 | 1 | 3 (Note: Appearance(s) in FIFA Club World Cup) | 0 | 45 | 2 |
| Palmeiras | Total | | 102 | 9 | 52 | 6 | 9 | 0 | 29 | 4 | 7 | 0 | 199 | 19 |
| Career total | | | 188 | 13 | 66 | 6 | 17 | 1 | 44 | 4 | 12 | 0 | 327 | 24 |

== Honours ==
Cruzeiro

- Copa do Brasil: 2017, 2018
- Campeonato Mineiro: 2018, 2019

Lokomotiv Moscow

- Russian Cup: 2020–21
- Russian Super Cup: 2019

Palmeiras

- Recopa Sudamericana: 2022
- Campeonato Paulista: 2022, 2023, 2024, 2026
- Campeonato Brasileiro Série A: 2022, 2023
- Supercopa do Brasil: 2023
- FIFA Club World Cup runner-up: 2021

Brazil U23

- Toulon Tournament: 2019

Individual

- Bola de Prata: 2022
- Best Centre back in Brazil: 2023
- Campeonato Brasileiro Série A Team of the Year: 2022, 2023
- Campeonato Paulista Team of the Year: 2024
