= Ariel Cabral =

Argentine footballer

Personal information
- Full name: Alejandro Ariel Cabral
- Date of birth: 11 September 1987 (age 39)
- Place of birth: Buenos Aires, Argentina
- Height: 1.87 m (6 ft 2 in)
- Positions: Central midfielder; left winger

Youth career
- Vélez Sársfield

Senior career*
Years	Team	Apps	(Gls)
2007–2015	Vélez Sársfield	144	(5)
2010–2011	→ Legia Warsaw (loan)	22	(3)
2015–2021	Cruzeiro	114	(1)
2020–2021	→ Goiás (loan)	20	(0)
2022–2023	Racing Montevideo	26	(1)

International career
2007	Argentina U20	6	(0)
2011	Argentina	2	(0)
Medal record
Men's football
Representing Argentina
FIFA U-20 World Cup
Winner	2007 Canada
- * Club domestic league appearances and goals as of 11 September 2024

Alejandro Ariel Cabral (born 11 September 1987) is an Argentine professional footballer who plays as a central midfielder or left winger.

== Club career ==
=== Vélez Sársfield ===
Cabral started his playing career in 2007 with Vélez Sársfield, during Ricardo La Volpe's coaching era. Despite playing in the youth system as an attacking midfielder, he has mostly played in the first team as a central midfielder. Cabral was part of Vélez' 2009 Torneo Clausura winning team, playing five games.

For the entire 2010–11 season, Vélez loaned Cabral to Legia Warsaw, for a fee of US$150,000 and a buyout price of US$2 million. Cabral showed considerable promise early on (scoring against Arsenal in a pre-season friendly and being called up to the senior national team). The Argentine midfielder played 40 minutes (including the extra time) in the final of the 2010–11 Polish Cup and scored on the penalty shootout. Winning the Polish Cup, Legia secured its right to play in the 2011–12 Europa League qualifying games. At the end of the season the club decided not to make use of the buyout clause and Cabral returned to Vélez Sársfield.

Upon his return, Cabral was relegated from Vélez's first team by Víctor Zapata. However, initially due to the latter's injuries, he started seeing more action during the first half of 2012, playing 15 games during the 2012 Clausura and 9 during the 2012 Copa Libertadores.

After Zapata's departure from the team in June 2012, Cabral established himself as a regular starter, playing all 19 games (and scoring twice) of Vélez's 2012 Inicial championship-winning campaign. The midfielder fractured his tibia in 2013 and was left out of the squad for the entire Torneo Final and Copa Libertadores, causing Vélez to obtain the loan of Fernando Gago as his replacement. He returned to Vélez first team in 2014 and was a starter in the 2013 Supercopa Argentina victory against Arsenal de Sarandí.

Cabral scored his last goal for Vélez in a 2–0 victory against Crucero del Norte for the second fixture of the 2015 Argentine Primera División and played his last game against Unión de Santa Fe, in a 2–1 defeat for the seventh fixture of that championship. His contract with the club ended in June 2015.

=== Cruzeiro ===
In 2015, Ariel Cabral was traded to then Campeonato Brasileiro Serie A Champions Cruzeiro as a replacement to Lucas Silva, sold to Real Madrid. Ariel quickly became one of the main players of the team's midfield, praised by fans for his cerebral style of play, being extremely competent both defensively and offensively, creating plays with magnificent passes even though his main task is defensive.

In Cruzeiro, Cabral was part of what became known as "La Banda", along with former Vélez Sarsfield star Lucas Romero and Uruguay wonderkid Giorgian De Arrascaeta.

== International career ==
Cabral played for the Argentina national under-20 football team that won the 2007 FIFA U-20 World Cup in Canada. He played the last minutes of the final game against Czech Republic.

Called by Sergio Batista, the midfielder made his debut for the Argentina national football team on 1 June 2011 in a 4–1 defeat to Nigeria, soon followed by another appearance in a 2–1 defeat to Poland.

== Career statistics ==
=== Club ===
As of 10 September 2020

Appearances and goals by club, season and competition
Club	Season	League		Cup		Continental		Other		Total	
Club	Season	Apps	Goals	Apps	Goals	Apps	Goals	Apps	Goals	Apps	Goals
Vélez Sársfield	2007	12	0	—		2	0	—		14	0
Vélez Sársfield	2008	9	0	—		—		—		9	0
Vélez Sársfield	2009	12	0	—		2	0	—		14	0
Vélez Sársfield	2010	9	1	—		4	0	—		13	1
Vélez Sársfield	2011	0	0	—		6	0	—		6	0
Vélez Sársfield	2012	26	1	—		10	0	—		36	1
Vélez Sársfield	2013	19	2	—		4	1	—		23	3
Vélez Sársfield	2014	33	0	1	0	9	0	—		43	0
Vélez Sársfield	2015	24	1	—		—		—		24	1
Vélez Sársfield	Total	144	5	1	0	37	1	—		182	6
Legia Warsaw (loan)	2010–11	22	3	—		—		—		22	3
Cruzeiro	2015	18	0	1	0	—		—		19	0
Cruzeiro	2016	25	1	9	0	—		13 (Note: Appearance(s) in the Campeonato Mineiro)	1	47	2
Cruzeiro	2017	14	0	9	0	1	0	11	1	35	1
Cruzeiro	2018	21	0	2	0	5	0	11	1	39	1
Cruzeiro	2019	16	0	4	0	5	0	7	0	32	0
Cruzeiro	2020	6	0	1	0	—		3	0	10	0
Cruzeiro	Total	100	1	26	0	11	0	45	3	163	4
Career total		266	9	27	0	48	1	45	3	367	13

== Honours ==
Vélez Sársfield

- Argentine Primera División: 2009 Clausura, 2012 Inicial, 2012–13 Superfinal
- Supercopa Argentina: 2013

Legia Warsaw

- Polish Cup: 2010–11

Cruzeiro

- Copa do Brasil: 2017, 2018

Argentina U20

- FIFA U-20 World Cup: 2007
