= Arthur (footballer, born June 1999) =

Brazilian footballer

Personal information
- Full name: Arthur Henrique Vieira Araújo
- Date of birth: 17 June 1999 (age 27)
- Place of birth: Belo Horizonte, Brazil
- Height: 1.88 m (6 ft 2 in)
- Position: Centre back

Team information
- Current team: St. Lucia
- Number: 5

Youth career
- Cruzeiro

Senior career*
Years	Team	Apps	(Gls)
2017–2022	Cruzeiro	7	(1)
2018	→ Nacional (loan)	2	(0)
2019	→ Tombense (loan)	5	(0)
2019	→ Estoril (loan)	0	(0)
2020–2021	→ América Mineiro (loan)	1	(0)
2021	→ Brasil de Pelotas (loan)	17	(0)
2022	→ Ferroviária (loan)	6	(1)
2022	Náutico	9	(0)
2023	Santa Cruz FC	13	(0)
2023	Betim Futebol	0	(0)
2023–	St. Lucia	1	(0)
- * Club domestic league appearances and goals as of 29 December 2023

Arthur Henrique Vieira Araújo (born 17 June 1999) is a Brazilian footballer who plays as a central defender for Maltese Premier League club St. Lucia.

== Club career ==
Born in Belo Horizonte, Arthur finished his graduation from Cruzeiro academy. On 8 August 2017, he was promoted to the senior squad and signed a contract which would keep him at the club till the end of December 2020.

On 31 August 2017, Arthur made his debut for the club in a Primeira Liga match against Grêmio. He signed a contract extension in October, committing him to the club till March 2021.

On 10 January 2019, Arthur was loaned out to Tombense. He was then loaned out to Portuguese club G.D. Estoril Praia in August 2019 until the next summer. However, he was recalled by Cruzeiro on 8 January 2020 to compose the squad in the 2020 season.

== Career statistics ==
As of 27 March 2021

Appearances and goals by club, season and competition
Club	Season	League			State League		National Cup		Continental		Other		Total	
Club	Season	Division	Apps	Goals	Apps	Goals	Apps	Goals	Apps	Goals	Apps	Goals	Apps	Goals
Cruzeiro	2017	Série A	2	0	0	0	0	0	—		2 (Note: Appearances in Primeira Liga)	0	4	0
Cruzeiro	2018	Série A	0	0	0	0	0	0	—		—		0	0
Cruzeiro	2019	Série A	0	0	0	0	0	0	—		—		0	0
Cruzeiro	2020	Série B	1	0	3	1	2	0	—		—		6	1
Cruzeiro	Total		3	0	3	1	2	0	0	0	2	0	10	1
Nacional (loan)	2018–19	Primeira Liga	2	0	—		0	0	—		2 (Note: Appearances in Taça da Liga)	0	4	0
Tombense (loan)	2019	Série C	2	0	3	0	0	0	—		—		5	0
Estoril (loan)	2019–20	Primeira Liga	0	0	—		0	0	—		0	0	0	0
América Mineiro (loan)	2020	Série B	1	0	—		0	0	—		—		1	0
Career total			8	0	6	1	2	0	0	0	4	0	20	1
