= Ezequiel (footballer, born 1993) =

Brazilian footballer

Personal information
- Full name: Ezequiel Jacinto de Biasi
- Date of birth: 22 February 1993 (age 33)
- Place of birth: Treze de Maio, Brazil
- Height: 1.78 m (5 ft 10 in)
- Position: Right back

Team information
- Current team: Amazonas

Youth career
- Criciúma

Senior career*
Years	Team	Apps	(Gls)
2012–2016	Criciúma	89	(4)
2013	→ Braga B (loan)	14	(0)
2014	→ Oeste (loan)	23	(0)
2016–2018	Cruzeiro	70	(1)
2019	Fluminense	10	(1)
2019	→ Bahia (loan)	6	(0)
2020–2021	Chapecoense	44	(0)
2022	Sport	18	(0)
2023	Londrina	31	(0)
2024	Amazonas	27	(0)
2025	ABC FC	8	(0)
2026–	Figueirense	8	(0)
- * Club domestic league appearances and goals as of 10 November 2026

Ezequiel Jacinto de Biasi (born 22 February 1993), simply known as Ezequiel, is a Brazilian professional footballer who plays as a right back for Amazonas.

== Career ==
=== Criciúma ===
Ezequiel made his league debut against Guaratinguetá on 19 May 2012. He scored his first goal against Guarani on 1 August 2012, scoring in the 51st minute.

=== Braga B ===
Ezequiel made his league debut against Leixões on 16 March 2013.

=== Oeste ===
Ezequiel made his league debut against Luverdense on 25 July 2014.

=== Cruzeiro ===
Ezequiel made his league debut against Fluminense on 17 July 2016. He scored his first goal for the club against Corinthians on 11 December 2016, scoring in the 57th minute.

=== Fluminense ===
Ezequiel made his league debut against Volta Redonda on 19 January 2019. He scored his first goal for the club against AA Portuguesa on 27 January 2019, scoring in the 14th minute.

=== Bahia ===
Ezequiel made his league debut against São Paulo on 19 May 2019.

=== Chapecoense ===
Ezequiel made his league debut against Joinville on 8 March 2020.

=== Sport ===
Ezequiel made his league debut against Sete de Setembro on 26 January 2022.

=== Londrina ===
Ezequiel made his league debut against Azuriz on 15 January 2023.

== Personal life ==
Ezequiel's younger brother Eduardo is also a footballer.

== Honours ==
Cruzeiro

- Copa do Brasil: 2017, 2018
- Campeonato Mineiro: 2018

Chapecoense

- Campeonato Catarinense: 2020
- Campeonato Brasileiro Série B: 2020
