= Edílson (footballer, born 1986) =

Brazilian footballer

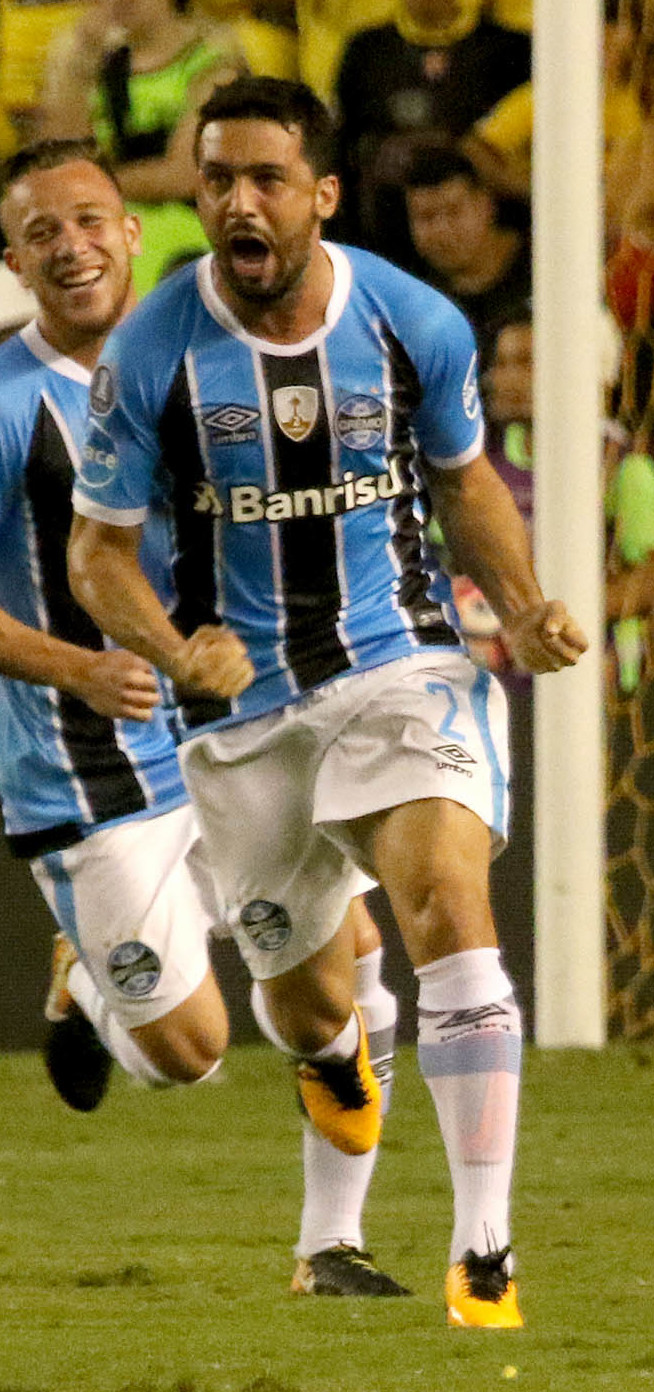
- Edílson with Grêmio in 2017

Personal information
- Full name: Edílson Mendes Guimarães
- Date of birth: 27 July 1986 (age 40)
- Place of birth: Nova Esperança, Brazil
- Height: 1.77 m (5 ft 10 in)
- Position: Right back

Youth career
- 2002–2005: Avaí

Senior career*
Years	Team	Apps	(Gls)
2004–2005	Avaí		
2005	Vitória	11	(0)
2005	Atlético Mineiro	5	(1)
2006–2007	Avaí		
2008	Veranópolis	2	(0)
2008	Guarani de Palhoça		
2008	Joinville		
2008	Juventus Jaraguá		
2009–2010	Ponte Preta	45	(6)
2010–2012	Grêmio	43	(2)
2011	→ Atlético Paranaense (loan)	18	(1)
2013–2014	Botafogo	46	(3)
2015–2016	Corinthians	34	(1)
2016–2017	Grêmio	52	(4)
2018–2020	Cruzeiro	55	(3)
2020	Goiás	10	(0)
2020–2021	Avaí	53	(5)
2022	Grêmio	14	(0)
- * Club domestic league appearances and goals as of 23 October 2022

Edílson Mendes Guimarães (born 27 July 1986), better known as Edílson, is a former Brazilian footballer football player who played as a right back.

He made his debut for Grêmio on 3 March 2010, against Avenida. The final score was 3–1 for Grêmio and Edílson made a goal and an assistance during the match. On 12 July 2011, he joined Atlético Paranaense on a one-and-half-year loan deal at the request of head coach Renato Gaúcho.

== Career statistics ==
As of match played 21 April 2016.

Club performance
Club	Season	Brasileirão Série A		Brasileirão Série B		Copa do Brasil		Libertadores		Copa Sudamericana		State League		Friendly		Total	
Club	Season	App	Goals	App	Goals	App	Goals	App	Goals	App	Goals	App	Goals	App	Goals	App	Goals
Ponte Preta	2009	23	5	0	0	0	0	0	0	0	0	15	1	0	0	38	6
Ponte Preta	2010	0	0	0	0	0	0	0	0	0	0	8	0	0	0	8	0
Grêmio	2010	16	1	0	0	7	0	0	0	2	0	10	1	0	0	38	6
Grêmio	2011	1	0	0	0	0	0	0	0	0	0	0	0	0	0	1	0
Atlético Paranaense	2011	18	1	0	0	0	0	0	0	0	0	0	0	0	0	18	1
Grêmio	2012	12	0	0	0	5	0	0	0	2	0	2	0	0	0	21	0
Botafogo	2013	23	1	0	0	5	1	0	0	2	0	3	0	0	0	31	1
Botafogo	2014	16	2	0	0	2	2	5	0	2	0	4	0	0	0	27	4
Corinthians	2015	18	0	0	0	1	0	1	0	0	0	9	0	4	0	33	0
Corinthians	2016	0	0	0	0	0	0	3	0	0	0	7	1	1	0	11	1
Total		127	10	0	0	20	3	9	0	8	0	58	3	5	0	227	16

== Honours ==
Vitória

- Campeonato Baiano: 2005

Botafogo

- Taça Rio: 2013
- Taça Guanabara: 2013
- Campeonato Carioca: 2013

Corinthians

- Campeonato Brasileiro Série A: 2015

Grêmio

- Copa do Brasil: 2016
- Copa Libertadores: 2017
- Recopa Gaúcha: 2022

Cruzeiro

- Copa do Brasil: 2018
- Campeonato Mineiro: 2018, 2019

Avaí

- Campeonato Catarinense: 2021
