= Lucas Romero =

Argentine footballer (born 1994)

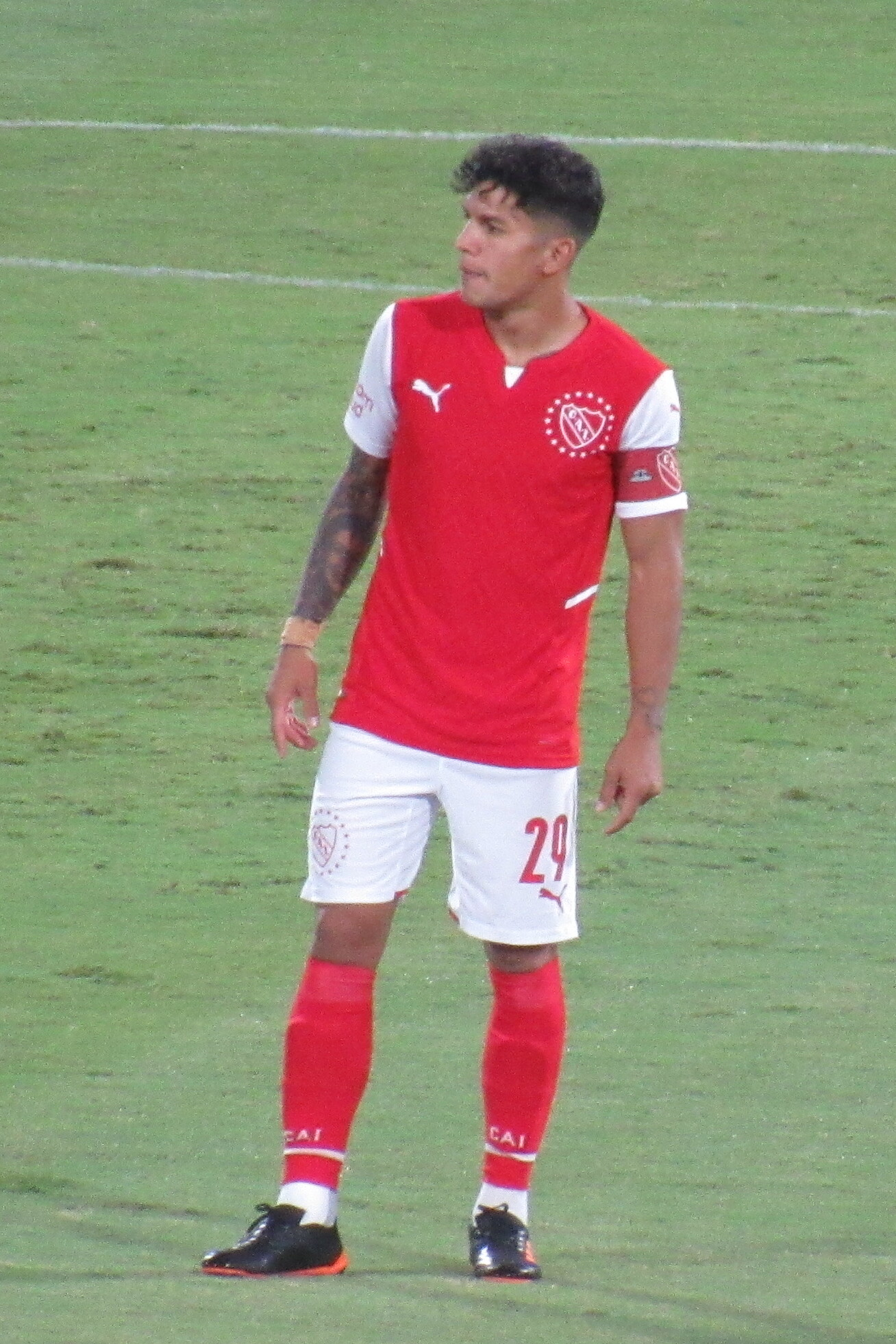
- Romero in 2022

Personal information
- Full name: Lucas Daniel Romero
- Date of birth: 18 April 1994 (age 32)
- Place of birth: Loma Hermosa, Argentina
- Height: 1.69 m (5 ft 7 in)
- Position: Defensive midfielder

Team information
- Current team: Cruzeiro
- Number: 29

Youth career
- 2001–2012: Vélez Sársfield

Senior career*
Years	Team	Apps	(Gls)
2012–2016	Vélez Sársfield	89	(2)
2016–2019	Cruzeiro	115	(3)
2019–2022	Independiente	91	(5)
2023	León	32	(0)
2024–	Cruzeiro	82	(2)

International career
2013	Argentina U20	4	(0)
- * Club domestic league appearances and goals as of 13 December 2025

Lucas Daniel Romero (born 18 April 1994) is an Argentine professional footballer who plays as a defensive midfielder for Campeonato Brasileiro Série A club Cruzeiro.

== Early life ==
Romero was born and raised in a humble neighborhood in Loma Hermosa, Greater Buenos Aires. He started playing youth football in Vélez Sársfield when he was 7 years old.

== Club career ==
=== Vélez Sársfield ===
Romero made his debut for Vélez Sársfield in 2012 at 18 years of age, coming on as a substitute in a 0–0 draw with Estudiantes de La Plata. In his first season with the first team, Romero helped Vélez to win the 2012 Inicial championship, playing 13 games (including 4 as a starter replacing injured Francisco Cerro). The midfielder also entered the field in Vélez's victory over Newell's Old Boys for the 2012–13 Superfinal and was a starter in his team's victory over Arsenal de Sarandí for the 2013 Supercopa Argentina. In 2016, Romero was transferred to Cruzeiro Esporte Clube.

=== Independiente ===
On 5 August 2019, Romero signed with Independiente. He debuted in a 3–0 defeat against Estudiantes de La Plata.

=== Club León ===
On 3 January 2023, Romero joined Club León. On 27 November 2023, he suffered a concussion during a match against Santos Laguna, and had to miss the first game of the Liga MX quarterfinals against América.

== International career ==
Romero played with the Argentina national under-20 football team the 2013 South American Youth Championship, in which his team was eliminated in the first round.

== Career statistics ==
As of 15 December 2023

Appearances and goals by club, season and competition
Club	Season	League			National cup		Continental		Other		Total	
Club	Season	Division	Apps	Goals	Apps	Goals	Apps	Goals	Apps	Goals	Apps	Goals
Vélez Sársfield	2012–13	Primera División	27	1	—		5	1	—		32	2
Vélez Sársfield	2013–14	Primera División	27	0	1	0	10	1	1	0	39	1
Vélez Sársfield	2014	Primera División	16	1	2	0	8	0	—		26	1
Vélez Sársfield	2015	Primera División	19	0	1	0	—		1	0	21	0
Vélez Sársfield	Total		89	2	4	0	23	2	2	0	118	4
Cruzeiro	2016	Série A	24	0	7	0	—		8 (Note: Appearances in Campeonato Mineiro)	1	39	1
Cruzeiro	2017	Série A	29	2	5	0	—		4 (Note: Two appearances in Campeonato Mineiro, two appearances in Primeira Liga)	0	38	2
Cruzeiro	2018	Série A	23	0	4	0	6 (Note: Appearances in Copa Libertadores)	0	10	0	43	0
Cruzeiro	2019	Série A	8	0	4	0	6	0	11	0	29	0
Cruzeiro	Total		84	2	20	0	12	0	33	1	149	3
Independiente	2019–20	Superliga	19	0	2	0	—		—		21	0
Independiente	2020–21	Superliga	7	1	2	0	7 (Note: Appearances in Copa Sudamericana)	0	—		16	1
Independiente	2021	Primera División	31	1	0	0	7	0	—		38	1
Independiente	2022	Primera División	34	3	3	0	5	0	2 (Note: Appearances in Torneos de Verano)	0	44	3
Independiente	Total		91	5	7	0	19	0	2	0	119	5
León	2022–23	Liga MX	16	0	—		3 (Note: Appearances in Leagues Cup)	0	—		19	0
León	2023–24	Liga MX	16	0	—		8 (Note: Appearances in CONCACAF Champions League)	0	1 (Note: Appearance in FIFA Club World Cup)	0	25	0
León	Total		32	0	0	0	11	0	1	0	44	0
Career total			296	9	31	0	65	2	38	1	430	12

== Honours ==
Vélez Sársfield

- Argentine Primera División: 2012 Inicial, 2012–13 Superfinal
- Supercopa Argentina: 2013

Cruzeiro

- Copa do Brasil: 2017, 2018
- Campeonato Mineiro: 2018

León

- CONCACAF Champions League: 2023

Individual

- Bola de Prata: 2025
- Campeonato Brasileiro Série A Team of the Year: 2025
