= Thiago Neves =

Brazilian footballer and coach

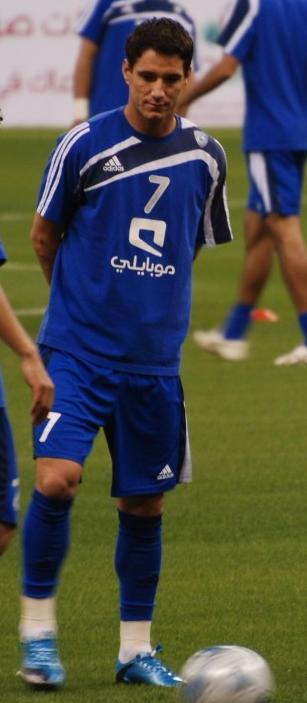
- Thiago Neves for Al-Hilal in 2010

Personal information
- Full name: Thiago Neves Augusto
- Date of birth: 27 February 1985 (age 41)
- Place of birth: Curitiba, Brazil
- Height: 1.80 m (5 ft 11 in)
- Position: Attacking midfielder

Senior career*
Years	Team	Apps	(Gls)
2005–2007	Paraná	29	(3)
2006	→ Vegalta Sendai (loan)	35	(8)
2007	→ Fluminense (loan)	41	(12)
2008	Fluminense	19	(9)
2008	Hamburger SV	6	(0)
2009–2011	→ Fluminense (loan)	19	(5)
2009	Al-Hilal	31	(17)
2011	→ Flamengo (loan)	49	(19)
2012–2013	Fluminense	50	(11)
2013–2015	Al-Hilal	42	(23)
2015–2016	Al-Jazira	27	(8)
2017–2019	Cruzeiro	111	(27)
2020	Grêmio	14	(1)
2020–2021	Sport Recife	43	(8)
Total		516	(151)

International career
2008	Brazil U-23	7	(3)
2008–2012	Brazil	7	(0)

Managerial career
- 2026: Bangu U-20
Medal record
Representing Brazil
Men's Football
Bronze medal – third place	2008 Beijing	Team competition
- * Club domestic league appearances and goals

Thiago Neves Augusto (born 27 February 1985) is a Brazilian coach and former professional footballer who played as an attacking midfielder. He is the current head coach of the U-20 team of Bangu AC.

== Club career ==
Born in Curitiba, Neves began his professional career with Paraná aged 20. His performances attracted attention overseas, and for the 2006 season he was loaned out to Vegalta Sendai of the J2 League.

In 2007, he joined Fluminense on a season-long loan. The Rio-based club made the move permanent after he impressed, scoring fourteen times in 42 appearances and also being crowned Copa do Brasil champion, his first title as a professional player.

In the 2008 Serie A, he was limited to only five appearances. However, he impressed in the Copa Libertadores, scoring seven in thirteen matches. This tally included a hat-trick in the second leg of the Copa Libertadores final, although he ended up on the losing side, as Fluminense drew 5–5 on aggregate with LDU Quito and were eventually defeated in a penalty shootout, with Neves missing his effort.

On 30 August 2008, Neves joined German club Hamburger SV and was seen as the ideal replacement for the outgoing Rafael van der Vaart. After only nine appearances, he left the club on 31 January 2009 and joined Al-Hilal for €7 million. However, the player did not play for the Saudi club and agreed to return to Fluminense, again on loan.

Neves returned to Brazil in 2011, joining Flamengo in January. In 2012, he rejoined Fluminense for the exact fee he was sold and at the end of that season he won three trophies as his club had a historic season.

In July 2013 he was sold back to Al-Hilal for €6 million, and in 2016 to Al Jazira. After almost four years in the Middle East, on 5 January 2017 Cruzeiro agreed to hire Neves until 2019. He was instrumental in Cruzeiro's 2017 and 2018 Copa do Brasil titles, while playing some of his best football, scoring 17 goals in 2017 and 15 in 2018.

On 27 January 2020, after leaving Cruzeiro, Neves joined Grêmio, but after fourteen matches he has his contract terminated by the board. On 19 September 2020 he was presented as a Sport Recife player, but after a year his contract was terminated.

== Coaching career ==
=== Bangu U-20 ===
On March 16, 2026, Thiago Neves was announced as the coach of Bangu's under-20 team, beginning his first professional experience outside of the playing field. The former player took on the role after observing the club's daily operations and being part of the coaching staff for a portion of the season, as a preparatory step for his coaching career.

== International career ==
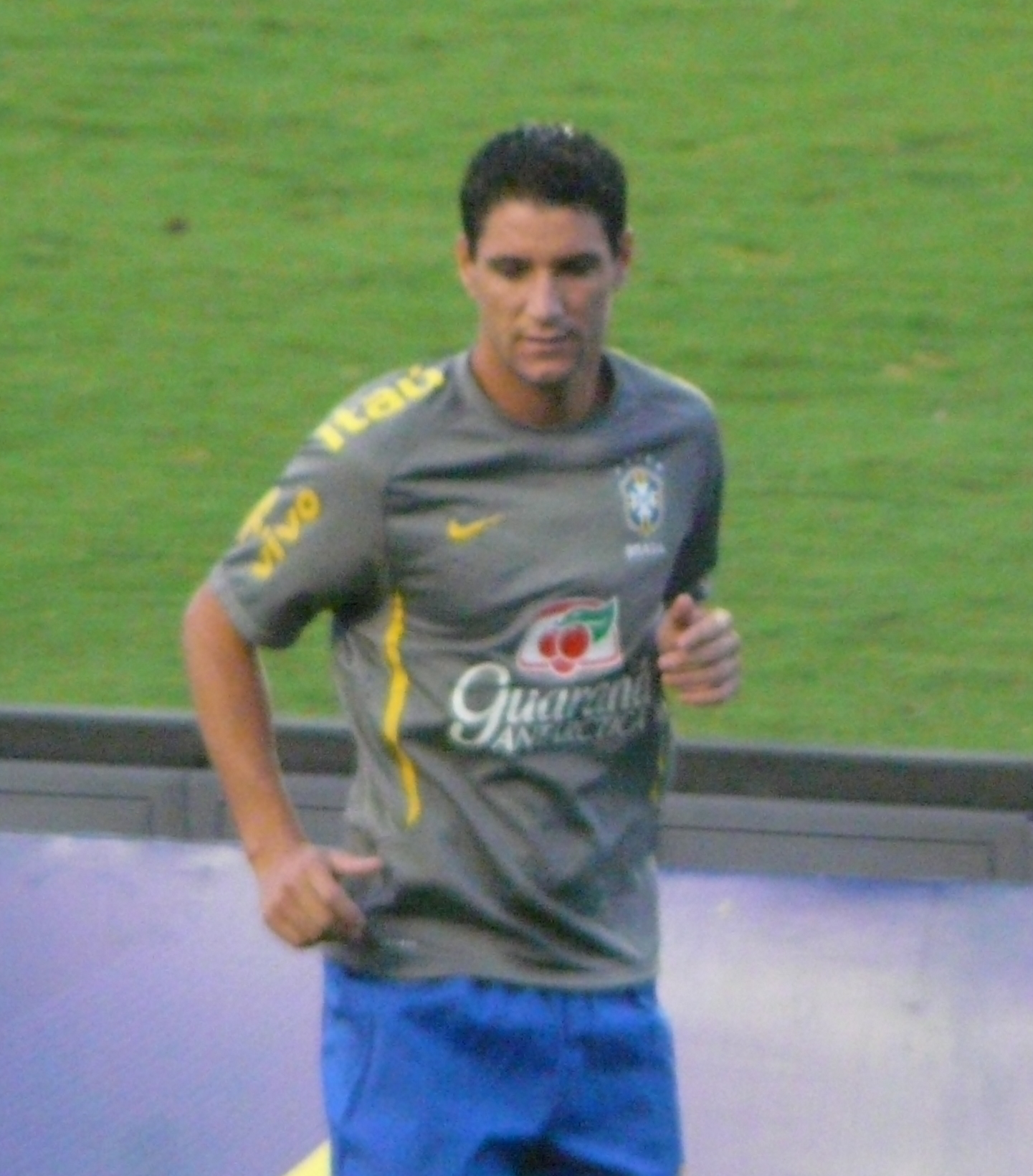
Thiago Neves with Brazil.

Thiago Neves made his international debut in a friendly match against Sweden on 26 March 2008. Later that year, he was called up to the Brazil U23 team for the 2008 Summer Olympics. In the Group C match against China, he scored two goals in the 3-0 win. Brazil eventually finished third.

Neves was placed in the preliminary squad list for the 2011 Copa América by Mano Menezes, but later missed out on a place in the final list for the tournament. He was also called for the 2011 and 2012 editions of the Superclásico de las Américas.

== Career statistics ==
=== Club ===
Appearances and goals by club, season and competition
Club	Season	League			State league		National cup		League cup		Continental		Other		Total	
Club	Season	Division	Apps	Goals	Apps	Goals	Apps	Goals	Apps	Goals	Apps	Goals	Apps	Goals	Apps	Goals
Paraná	2005	Série A	29	3	—		—		—		—		—		29	3
Vegalta Sendai (loan)	2006	J2 League	35	8	—		0	0	1	0	—		—		36	8
Fluminense (loan)	2007	Série A	33	12	8	0	9	2	—		—		—		50	14
Fluminense	2008	Série A	5	1	14	8	0	0	—		13	7	—		32	16
Fluminense	Total		38	13	22	8	9	2	—		13	7	—		82	30
Hamburger SV	2008–09	Bundesliga	6	0	—		0	0	0	0	3	0	—		9	0
Fluminense (loan)	2009	Série A	7	0	12	5	4	2	—		0	0	—		23	7
Al-Hilal	2009–10	Saudi Pro League	20	11	—		4	1	2	2	6	2	—		32	16
Al-Hilal	2010–11	Saudi Pro League	11	6	—		0	0	0	0	3	0	—		14	6
Al-Hilal	Total		31	17	—		4	1	2	2	9	2	—		46	22
Flamengo (loan)	2011	Série A	33	12	16	7	6	2	—		2	0	—		57	21
Fluminense	2012	Série A	29	5	11	4	0	0	—		9	0	—		49	9
Fluminense	2013	Série A	2	0	8	2	0	0	—		6	0	—		16	2
Fluminense	Total		31	5	19	6	0	0	—		15	0	—		65	11
Al Hilal	2013–14	Saudi Pro League	22	13	—		3	1	1	0	5	3	—		31	17
Al Hilal	2014–15	Saudi Pro League	20	10	—		4	3	4	5	13	2	—		41	20
Al Hilal	Total		42	23	—		7	4	5	5	18	5	—		72	37
Al-Jazira	2015–16	UAE Pro League	25	8	—		5	3	0	0	7	0	—		37	11
Al-Jazira	2016–17	UAE Pro League	2	0	—		2	1	1	1	0	0	—		5	2
Al-Jazira	Total		27	8	—		7	4	1	1	7	0	—		42	13
Cruzeiro	2017	Série A	33	11	9	2	13	2	—		2	2	—		57	17
Cruzeiro	2018	Série A	24	3	12	5	7	2	—		10	5	—		53	15
Cruzeiro	2019	Série A	28	6	5	0	4	3	—		4	0	—		41	9
Cruzeiro	Total		85	20	26	7	24	7	—		16	7	—		153	41
Grêmio	2020	Série A	5	0	9	1	0	0	—		0	0	—		14	1
Sport Recife	2020	Série A	25	6	—		—		—		—		—		25	6
Sport Recife	2021	Série A	14	1	4	1	0	0	—		—		3	0	21	2
Sport Recife	Total		39	7	4	1	0	0	0	0	—		3	0	47	8
Career total			408	116	108	35	61	22	9	8	87	21	3	0	676	202

=== International ===
Appearances and goals by national team and year
National team	Year	Apps	Goals
Brazil	2008	1	0
Brazil	2009	0	0
Brazil	2010	0	0
Brazil	2011	1	0
Brazil	2012	5	0
Total		7	0

== Honours ==
Fluminense

- Série A: 2012
- Copa do Brasil: 2007
- Taça Guanabara: 2012
- Campeonato Carioca: 2012

Al-Hilal

- Saudi Premier League: 2009, 2010
- Crown Prince Cup: 2010
- Kings Cup: 2015

Flamengo

- Taça Guanabara: 2011
- Taça Rio: 2011
- Campeonato Carioca: 2011

Cruzeiro

- Copa do Brasil: 2017, 2018
- Campeonato Mineiro: 2018, 2019

Grêmio

- Campeonato Gaúcho: 2020

Brazil

- 2008 Summer Olympics: Bronze medal winner
- Superclásico de las Américas: 2012

Individual

- Bola de Prata: 2007, 2017
- Bola de Ouro: 2007
- Best Player of Campeonato Paranaense Under-20: 2004
- Saudi Professional League Player of the Round: Round 11
- 2011 Campeonato Carioca Best Attacking Midfielder
- 2011 Campeonato Carioca Best Player (People's Choice)
- 2011 Campeonato Carioca Best Player
- Campeonato Brasileiro Team of the year: 2017
