= 2020 Copa do Brasil first round =

Brazilian football competition

The 2020 Copa do Brasil first round was the first round of the 2020 Copa do Brasil football competition. It was played from 5 to 26 February 2020. A total of 80 teams competed in the first round to decide 40 places in the second round of the tournament.

== Draw ==
The draw for the first and second rounds was held on 12 December 2019, 14:00 at CBF headquarters in Rio de Janeiro. Teams were seeded by their CBF ranking (shown in parentheses). The 80 qualified teams were divided in eight groups (A-H) with 10 teams each. The matches were drawn from the respective confronts: A vs. E; B vs. F; C vs. G; D vs. H. The lower-ranked teams hosted the first round match.

Group A	Group B	Group C	Group D
(Minas Gerais) Cruzeiro (4); (Minas Gerais) Atlético Mineiro (7); Bahia (10); (Santa Catarina (state)) Chapecoense (12); (Rio de Janeiro (state)) Fluminense (13); (Rio de Janeiro (state)) Botafogo (14); (Rio de Janeiro (state)) Vasco da Gama (15); (Pernambuco) Sport (16); (Bahia) Vitória (17); (Minas Gerais) América Mineiro (18)	Ceará (19); Goiás (20); (São Paulo (state)) Ponte Preta (21); (Santa Catarina (state)) Avaí (22); (Paraná (state)) Coritiba (24); (Goiás) Atlético Goianiense (25); (Paraná (state)) Paraná (26); (Santa Catarina (state)) Figueirense (27); (Pará) Paysandu (28); (Rio Grande do Sul) Juventude (29)	(Alagoas) CSA (30); (Paraná (state)) Londrina (31); (Alagoas) CRB (32); (Goiás) Vila Nova (33); (Pernambuco) Santa Cruz (34); (Maranhão) Sampaio Corrêa (35); (Santa Catarina (state)) Criciúma (36); (São Paulo (state)) Oeste (38); (Rio Grande do Sul) Brasil de Pelotas (39); (Mato Grosso) Luverdense (40)	(Pernambuco) Náutico (41); (Minas Gerais) Boa Esporte (44); (Rio Grande do Norte) ABC (45); (Paraíba) Botafogo (47); (Paraná (state)) Operário Ferroviário (50); (Pará) Remo (53); (Rio de Janeiro (state)) Volta Redonda (56); (Acre (state)) Atlético Acreano (60); (Rio Grande do Norte) América de Natal (62); (Rio Grande do Sul) São José (63)
Group E	Group F	Group G	Group H
(Maranhão) Moto Club (65); (Santa Catarina (state)) Brusque (66); (Maranhão) Imperatriz (67); (Paraíba) Campinense (70); (Piauí) Altos (71); (Amapá) Santos (77); (Piauí) Ríver (79); (Rio Grande do Sul) Caxias (84); (Rio de Janeiro (state)) Boavista (85); (Roraima) São Raimundo (88)	(Amazonas (Brazilian state)) Manaus (89); (Federal District (Brazil)) Brasiliense (94); (São Paulo (state)) Ferroviária (99); (Rio Grande do Sul) Novo Hamburgo (105); (Alagoas) Coruripe (109); (Pará) Bragantino (110); (Amazonas (Brazilian state)) Fast Clube (111); (São Paulo (state)) Novorizontino (113); (Tocantins) Palmas (118); (Mato Grosso) União Rondonópolis (119)	(Acre (state)) Galvez (123); (Pará) Independente (129); (Espírito Santo) Vitória (151); Bahia de Feira (160); (Federal District (Brazil)) Gama (160); (São Paulo (state)) XV de Piracicaba (189); (Rio de Janeiro (state)) Bangu (189); (Mato Grosso) CEOV (198); (São Paulo (state)) Santo André (210); (Mato Grosso do Sul) Águia Negra (220)	(Rio Grande do Sul) São Luiz (no rank); (Paraná (state)) Toledo (no rank); (Bahia) Atlético de Alagoinhas (no rank); (Pernambuco) Afogados (no rank); (Ceará) Barbalha (no rank); (Ceará) Caucaia (no rank); (Sergipe) Freipaulistano (no rank); (Sergipe) Lagarto (no rank); (Mato Grosso do Sul) Aquidauanense (no rank); (Rondônia) Vilhenense (no rank)

== Format ==
In the first round, each tie was played on a single-legged basis. The lower-ranked team hosted the match. If tied after 90 minutes, the higher-ranked team would automatically advance to second round.

== Matches ==
All times are Brasília time, BRT (UTC−3).

Team 1	Score	Team 2
Ríver (Piauí)	1–0	Bahia
São Luiz (Rio Grande do Sul)	0–0	(Rio Grande do Norte) América de Natal
Coruripe (Alagoas)	0–0	(Rio Grande do Sul) Juventude
XV de Piracicaba (São Paulo (state))	1–0	(Paraná (state)) Londrina
Caxias (Rio Grande do Sul)	1–1	(Rio de Janeiro (state)) Botafogo
Toledo (Paraná (state))	0–2	(Pernambuco) Náutico
Palmas (Tocantins)	0–2	(Paraná (state)) Paraná
Bahia de Feira	3–1	(Mato Grosso) Luverdense
Brusque (Santa Catarina (state))	2–1	(Pernambuco) Sport
Freipaulistano (Sergipe)	1–2	(Pará) Remo
Manaus (Amazonas (Brazilian state))	1–0	(Paraná (state)) Coritiba
Gama (Federal District (Brazil))	3–3	(Rio Grande do Sul) Brasil de Pelotas
São Raimundo (Roraima)	2–2	(Minas Gerais) Cruzeiro
Vilhenense (Rondônia)	1–1	(Minas Gerais) Boa Esporte
Brasiliense (Federal District (Brazil))	1–1	(Pará) Paysandu
Independente (Pará)	2–3	(Alagoas) CRB
Moto Club (Maranhão)	2–4	(Rio de Janeiro (state)) Fluminense
Atlético de Alagoinhas (Bahia)	0–0	(Paraíba) Botafogo
Novorizontino (São Paulo (state))	1–2	(Santa Catarina (state)) Figueirense
Vitória (Espírito Santo)	2–1	(Alagoas) CSA
Boavista (Rio de Janeiro (state))	0–2	(Santa Catarina (state)) Chapecoense
Caucaia (Ceará)	1–2	(Rio Grande do Sul) São José
União Rondonópolis (Mato Grosso)	0–1	(Goiás) Atlético Goianiense
CEOV (Mato Grosso)	0–0	(Pernambuco) Santa Cruz
Imperatriz (Maranhão)	0–0	(Bahia) Vitória
Lagarto (Sergipe)	1–0	(Rio de Janeiro (state)) Volta Redonda
Bragantino (Pará)	1–2	Ceará
Bangu (Rio de Janeiro (state))	1–1	(São Paulo (state)) Oeste
Campinense (Paraíba)	0–0	(Minas Gerais) Atlético Mineiro
Afogados (Pernambuco)	3–0	(Acre (state)) Atlético Acreano
Novo Hamburgo (Rio Grande do Sul)	1–2	(São Paulo (state)) Ponte Preta
Galvez (Acre (state))	0–1	(Goiás) Vila Nova
Altos (Piauí)	1–1	(Rio de Janeiro (state)) Vasco da Gama
Aquidauanense (Mato Grosso do Sul)	0–1	(Rio Grande do Norte) ABC
Fast Clube (Amazonas (Brazilian state))	0–2	Goiás
Santo André (São Paulo (state))	4–1	(Santa Catarina (state)) Criciúma
Santos (Amapá)	1–1	(Minas Gerais) América Mineiro
Barbalha (Ceará)	0–3	(Paraná (state)) Operário Ferroviário
Ferroviária (São Paulo (state))	2–0	(Santa Catarina (state)) Avaí
Águia Negra (Mato Grosso do Sul)	2–1	(Maranhão) Sampaio Corrêa

=== Match 1 ===
5 February 2020
21:30

Ríver (Piauí)	1–0	Bahia
Jean Natal 87'	Report

Albertão, Teresina
Attendance: 3,972
Referee: Jefferson Ferreira de Moraes (Goiás)

=== Match 2 ===
5 February 2020
20:30

São Luiz (Rio Grande do Sul)	0–0	(Rio Grande do Norte) América de Natal
	Report

Estádio 19 de Outubro, Ijuí
Attendance: 1,922
Referee: Leonardo Sígari Zanon (Paraná)

=== Match 3 ===
5 February 2020
15:30

Coruripe (Alagoas)	0–0	(Rio Grande do Sul) Juventude
	Report

Estádio Municipal Gerson Amaral, Coruripe
Attendance: 703
Referee: Maguielson Lima Barbosa (Distrito Federal)

=== Match 4 ===
5 February 2020
20:30

XV de Piracicaba (São Paulo (state))	1–0	(Paraná (state)) Londrina
Samuel Andrade 56'	Report

Estádio Barão da Serra Negra, Piracicaba
Attendance: 2,126
Referee: Andrey da Silva e Silva (Pará)

=== Match 5 ===
5 February 2020
21:30

Caxias (Rio Grande do Sul)	1–1	(Rio de Janeiro (state)) Botafogo
Carlos Alberto 18'	Report	Pedro Raúl 13'

Estádio Centenário, Caxias do Sul
Attendance: 3,021
Referee: Lucas Canetto Bellote (São Paulo)

=== Match 6 ===
12 February 2020
21:30

Toledo (Paraná (state))	0–2	(Pernambuco) Náutico
	Report	Jean Carlos 59' (pen.); Matheus Carvalho 69'

Estádio Municipal 14 de Dezembro, Toledo
Attendance: 2,361
Referee: Rodrigo da Fonseca Silva (Mato Grosso)

=== Match 7 ===
5 February 2020
21:30

Palmas (Tocantins)	0–2	(Paraná (state)) Paraná
	Report	Thiago Alves 32', 69'

Estádio Nilton Santos, Palmas
Attendance: 2,162
Referee: Marco Aurélio Augusto Fazekas Ferreira (Minas Gerais)

=== Match 8 ===
5 February 2020
20:30

Bahia de Feira	3–1	(Mato Grosso) Luverdense
Deon 15'; Menezes 66'; Jarbas 71'	Report	Kauê 85'

Estádio Jodilton Souza, Feira de Santana
Attendance: 1,398
Referee: Graziani Maciel Rocha (Rio de Janeiro)

=== Match 9 ===
12 February 2020
19:15

Brusque (Santa Catarina (state))	2–1	(Pernambuco) Sport
Edu 23'; Ianson 82'	Report	Barcia 35'

Estádio Augusto Bauer, Brusque
Attendance: 3,213
Referee: Douglas Marques das Flores (São Paulo)

=== Match 10 ===
12 February 2020
16:00

Freipaulistano (Sergipe)	1–2	(Pará) Remo
Luan 21'	Report	Fredson 35'; Gustavo Ermel 70'

Estádio Municipal Jairton Menezes de Mendonça, Frei Paulo
Attendance: 623
Referee: André Rodrigo Rocha (Tocantins)

=== Match 11 ===
12 February 2020
22:30

Manaus (Amazonas (Brazilian state))	1–0	(Paraná (state)) Coritiba
Rossini 45'	Report

Arena da Amazônia, Manaus
Attendance: 17,123
Referee: Diego Pombo Lopez (Bahia)

=== Match 12 ===
12 February 2020
20:30

Gama (Federal District (Brazil))	3–3	(Rio Grande do Sul) Brasil de Pelotas
Nunes 12' (pen.); Luquinhas 31'; Michel Platini 85'	Report	Wesley Pacheco 8'; Wellington Simião 29' (pen.); Gabriel Poveda 61'

Bezerrão, Gama
Attendance: 3,691
Referee: José Woshington da Silva (Pernambuco)

=== Match 13 ===
13 February 2020
21:30

São Raimundo (Roraima)	2–2	(Minas Gerais) Cruzeiro
Edson 25'; Stanley 65'	Report	Edu 34'; Alexandre Jesus 49'

Estádio Flamarion Vasconcelos, Boa Vista
Attendance: 4,715
Referee: Alexandre Vargas Tavares de Jesus (Rio de Janeiro)

=== Match 14 ===
5 February 2020
20:30

Vilhenense (Rondônia)	1–1	(Minas Gerais) Boa Esporte
Arielton 73'	Report	Anderson Gindré 29'

Estádio Arnaldo Lopes Martins, Vilhena
Attendance: 1,044
Referee: Luiz Paulo de Moura Pinheiro (Mato Grosso)

=== Match 15 ===
6 February 2020
19:15

Brasiliense (Federal District (Brazil))	1–1	(Pará) Paysandu
Marcos Aurélio 52' (pen.)	Report	Perema 3'

Estádio Zequinha Roriz, Luziânia
Attendance: 344
Referee: Pathrice Wallace Corrêa Maia (Rio de Janeiro)

=== Match 16 ===
5 February 2020
15:30

Independente (Pará)	2–3	(Alagoas) CRB
Leandro Cabecinha 2', 90+3' (pen.)	Report	Rafael Longuine 5', 46'; Léo Gamalho 58'

Baenão, Belém
Attendance: 480
Referee: Ramon Abatti Abel (Santa Catarina)

=== Match 17 ===
26 February 2020
21:30

Moto Club (Maranhão)	2–4	(Rio de Janeiro (state)) Fluminense
Walace 1'; Jeorge 11'	Report	Nenê 16' (pen.), 48'; Nino 72'; Marcos Paulo 83'

Castelão, São Luís
Attendance: 4,858
Referee: Felipe Fernandes de Lima (Minas Gerais)

=== Match 18 ===
12 February 2020
20:30

Atlético de Alagoinhas (Bahia)	0–0	(Paraíba) Botafogo
	Report

Estádio Municipal Antônio de Figueiredo Carneiro, Alagoinhas
Attendance: 5,417
Referee: Tiago Nascimento dos Santos (Pernambuco)

=== Match 19 ===
6 February 2020
16:30

Novorizontino (São Paulo (state))	1–2	(Santa Catarina (state)) Figueirense
Thiago Ribeiro 14' (pen.)	Report	Alemão 62'; Diego Gonçalves 70'

Estádio Dr. Jorge Ismael de Biasi, Novo Horizonte
Attendance: 1,356
Referee: Emerson Ricardo de Almeida Andrade (Bahia)

=== Match 20 ===
6 February 2020
20:30

Vitória (Espírito Santo)	2–1	(Alagoas) CSA
Cássio 43'; Edinho 50'	Report	Allano 21'

Estádio Salvador Venâncio da Costa, Vitória
Attendance: 1,512
Referee: Douglas Schwengber da Silva (Rio Grande do Sul)

=== Match 21 ===
19 February 2020
19:15

Boavista (Rio de Janeiro (state))	0–2	(Santa Catarina (state)) Chapecoense
	Report	Aylon 41'; Foguinho 58'

Estádio Elcyr Resende de Mendonça, Saquarema
Attendance: 1,579
Referee: Rodrigo Batista Raposo (Distrito Federal)

=== Match 22 ===
12 February 2020
16:00

Caucaia (Ceará)	1–2	(Rio Grande do Sul) São José
Vítor Jacaré 55'	Report	Alexandre Camargo 75'; Crystopher 87'

Estádio Raimundo de Oliveira, Caucaia
Attendance: 663
Referee: Paulo Henrique de Melo Salmazio (Mato Grosso do Sul)

=== Match 23 ===
6 February 2020
21:30

União Rondonópolis (Mato Grosso)	0–1	(Goiás) Atlético Goianiense
	Report	Matheuzinho 49'

Estádio Engenheiro Luthero Lopes, Rondonópolis
Attendance: 4,571
Referee: Alisson Sidnei Furtado (Tocantins)

=== Match 24 ===
5 February 2020
21:30

CEOV (Mato Grosso)	0–0	(Pernambuco) Santa Cruz
	Report

Arena Pantanal, Cuiabá
Attendance: 832
Referee: Ivan da Silva Guimarães Júnior (Amazonas)

=== Match 25 ===
11 February 2020
21:30

Imperatriz (Maranhão)	0–0	(Bahia) Vitória
	Report

Estádio Frei Epifânio D'Abadia, Imperatriz
Attendance: 6,542
Referee: Wanderson Alves de Sousa (Minas Gerais)

=== Match 26 ===
19 February 2020
15:30

Lagarto (Sergipe)	1–0	(Rio de Janeiro (state)) Volta Redonda
Sapé 61'	Report

Estádio Estadual de Simão Dias, Simão Dias
Attendance: 720
Referee: Valdicleuson Silva da Costa (Amapá)

=== Match 27 ===
12 February 2020
15:30

Bragantino (Pará)	1–2	Ceará
Canga 88'	Report	Luiz Otávio 45+1'; Bergson 90+5'

Estádio São Benedito, Bragança
Attendance: 1,193
Referee: José Mendonça da Silva Júnior (Paraná)

=== Match 28 ===
12 February 2020
16:00

Bangu (Rio de Janeiro (state))	1–1	(São Paulo (state)) Oeste
Rodrigo Lobão 11'	Report	Alyson 51'

Estádio Moça Bonita, Rio de Janeiro
Attendance: 693
Referee: Vinícius Gomes do Amaral (Rio Grande do Sul)

=== Match 29 ===
12 February 2020
21:30

Campinense (Paraíba)	0–0	(Minas Gerais) Atlético Mineiro
	Report

Amigão, Campina Grande
Attendance: 4,300
Referee: Antônio Dib Moraes de Sousa (Piauí)

=== Match 30 ===
13 February 2020
20:30

Afogados (Pernambuco)	3–0	(Acre (state)) Atlético Acreano
Diego Ceará 24', 40'; Douglas Bomba 74'	Report

Estádio Valdemar Viana de Araújo, Afogados da Ingazeira
Attendance: 1,638
Referee: Thayslane de Melo Costa (Sergipe)

=== Match 31 ===
13 February 2020
19:15

Novo Hamburgo (Rio Grande do Sul)	1–2	(São Paulo (state)) Ponte Preta
Alison 53'	Report	João Paulo 2'; Roger 79'

Estádio do Vale, Novo Hamburgo
Attendance: 364
Referee: William Machado Steffen (Santa Catarina)

=== Match 32 ===
12 February 2020
21:30

Galvez (Acre (state))	0–1	(Goiás) Vila Nova
	Report	Adalberto 56'

Arena da Floresta, Rio Branco
Attendance: 860
Referee: Adriano Barros Carneiro (Ceará)

=== Match 33 ===
12 February 2020
21:30

Altos (Piauí)	1–1	(Rio de Janeiro (state)) Vasco da Gama
Marrony 20' (o.g.)	Report	Cano 45+2'

Albertão, Teresina
Attendance: 11,600
Referee: Dyorgines José Padovani de Andrade (Espírito Santo)

=== Match 34 ===
5 February 2020
21:30

Aquidauanense (Mato Grosso do Sul)	0–1	(Rio Grande do Norte) ABC
	Report	Igor Goularte 78'

Estádio Municipal de Aquidauana, Aquidauana
Attendance: 2,480
Referee: Charly Wendy Straub Deretti (Santa Catarina)

=== Match 35 ===
5 February 2020
22:30

Fast Clube (Amazonas (Brazilian state))	0–2	Goiás
	Report	Daniel Bessa 53'; Marcinho 88'

Arena da Amazônia, Manaus
Attendance: 545
Referee: Jonathan Antero Silva (Rondônia)

=== Match 36 ===
5 February 2020
16:30

Santo André (São Paulo (state))	4–1	(Santa Catarina (state)) Criciúma
Douglas Baggio 3'; Ronaldo 25'; Branquinho 48', 59'	Report	Andrew 87'

Estádio Bruno José Daniel, Santo André
Attendance: 992
Referee: Lucas Paulo Torezin (Paraná)

=== Match 37 ===
5 February 2020
20:30

Santos (Amapá)	1–1	(Minas Gerais) América Mineiro
Diego MacLaren 81'	Report	Rodolfo 17'

Zerão, Macapá
Attendance: 593
Referee: Zandick Gondim Alves Júnior (Rio Grande do Norte)

=== Match 38 ===
5 February 2020
15:30

Barbalha (Ceará)	0–3	(Paraná (state)) Operário Ferroviário
	Report	Rafael Bonfim 20'; Jefinho 49'; Bustamante 70'

Estádio Lírio Callou, Barbalha
Attendance: 740
Referee: José Wellington Bandeira (Espírito Santo)

=== Match 39 ===
13 February 2020
16:30

Ferroviária (São Paulo (state))	2–0	(Santa Catarina (state)) Avaí
Henan 65'; Hygor 70'	Report

Estádio Fonte Luminosa, Araraquara
Attendance: 1,398
Referee: Eduardo Tomaz de Aquino Valadão (Goiás)

=== Match 40 ===
12 February 2020
21:30

Águia Negra (Mato Grosso do Sul)	2–1	(Maranhão) Sampaio Corrêa
Erick Bahia 17'; Paulo Sérgio 83' (o.g.)	Report	Gustavo Ramos 90+4'

Estádio Iliê Vidal, Rio Brilhante
Attendance: 1,875
Referee: Wasley do Couto Leão (Pará)
