= 2020 Copa do Brasil second round =

The 2020 Copa do Brasil second round was the second round of the 2020 Copa do Brasil football competition. It was played from 18 February to 5 March 2020. A total of 40 teams competed in the second round to decide 20 places in the third round of the 2020 Copa do Brasil.

== Format ==
In the second round, each tie was played on a single-legged basis. If the score was level, the match would go straight to the penalty shoot-out to determine the winner. Host teams were settled in the first-round draw.

== Matches ==
All times are Brasília time, BRT (UTC−3)

Team 1	Score	Team 2
Ríver (Piauí)	1–1 (3–4 p)	(Rio Grande do Norte) América de Natal
XV de Piracicaba (São Paulo (state))	1–1 (7–8 p)	(Rio Grande do Sul) Juventude
Náutico (Pernambuco)	1–1 (3–4 p)	(Rio de Janeiro (state)) Botafogo
Paraná (Paraná (state))	3–2	Bahia de Feira
Brusque (Santa Catarina (state))	5–1	(Pará) Remo
Brasil de Pelotas (Rio Grande do Sul)	1–0	(Amazonas (Brazilian state)) Manaus
Boa Esporte (Minas Gerais)	1–1 (4–5 p)	(Minas Gerais) Cruzeiro
Paysandu (Pará)	1–1 (3–5 p)	(Alagoas) CRB
Fluminense (Rio de Janeiro (state))	2–0	(Paraíba) Botafogo
Vitória (Espírito Santo)	0–1	(Santa Catarina (state)) Figueirense
São José (Rio Grande do Sul)	0–0 (5–4 p)	(Santa Catarina (state)) Chapecoense
Atlético Goianiense (Goiás)	1–1 (4–3 p)	(Pernambuco) Santa Cruz
Vitória (Bahia)	3–1	(Sergipe) Lagarto
Oeste (São Paulo (state))	1–1 (2–4 p)	Ceará
Afogados (Pernambuco)	2–2 (7–6 p)	(Minas Gerais) Atlético Mineiro
Ponte Preta (São Paulo (state))	0–0 (5–3 p)	(Goiás) Vila Nova
Vasco da Gama (Rio de Janeiro (state))	1–0	(Rio Grande do Norte) ABC
Santo André (São Paulo (state))	0–2	Goiás
Operário Ferroviário (Paraná (state))	0–2	(Minas Gerais) América Mineiro
Ferroviária (São Paulo (state))	6–2	(Mato Grosso do Sul) Águia Negra

=== Match 41 ===
26 February 2020
20:30

Ríver (Piauí)	1–1	(Rio Grande do Norte) América de Natal
Valdo Bacabal 67'	Report	Dione 10'
Penalties
Bismarck (penalty scored); Érico Júnior (penalty scored); Valdo Bacabal (penalty missed); Gustavo Henrique (penalty missed); Romário Rodrigues (penalty scored)	3–4	(penalty scored) André Krobel; (penalty scored) Tiago Orobó; (penalty missed) Michael; (penalty scored) Lelê; (penalty scored) Romarinho

Albertão, Teresina
Attendance: 2,439
Referee: Christiano Gayo Nascimento (Distrito Federal)

=== Match 42 ===
26 February 2020
16:30

XV de Piracicaba (São Paulo (state))	1–1	(Rio Grande do Sul) Juventude
Daniel Costa 47'	Report	Eltinho 70'
Penalties
Daniel Costa (penalty scored); Marcelinho (penalty missed); Gilberto Alemao (penalty missed); Diego Jussani (penalty scored); Walfrido (penalty scored); Gabriel Soares (penalty scored); Paulão (penalty scored); Kadu Barone (penalty scored); Bruninho (penalty scored); Mota (penalty missed)	7–8	(penalty missed) Eltinho; (penalty scored) Igor; (penalty missed) João Paulo; (penalty scored) Edcarlos; (penalty scored) Bruno Alves; (penalty scored) Samuel Santos; (penalty scored) John Lennon; (penalty scored) Iago Dias; (penalty scored) Caíque Valdivia; (penalty scored) Marcelo Carné

Estádio Barão da Serra Negra, Piracicaba
Attendance: 2,303
Referee: Rodrigo Carvalhães de Miranda (Rio de Janeiro)

=== Match 43 ===
19 February 2020
21:30

Náutico (Pernambuco)	1–1	(Rio de Janeiro (state)) Botafogo
Jean Carlos 43'	Report	Bruno Nazário 68'
Penalties
Jean Carlos (penalty scored); Ronaldo Alves (penalty missed); Jhonnatan (penalty scored); Josa (penalty scored); Paiva (penalty missed)	3–4	(penalty scored) Pedro Raúl; (penalty scored) Alex Santana; (penalty missed) Luiz Fernando; (penalty scored) Bruno Nazário; (penalty scored) Danilo Barcelos

Estádio dos Aflitos, Recife
Attendance: 10,717
Referee: André Luiz de Freitas Castro (Goiás)

=== Match 44 ===
26 February 2020
19:15

Paraná (Paraná (state))	3–2	Bahia de Feira
Thales 90+1'; Fabrício 90+3'; Renan Bressan 90+7'	Report	Léo Porto 59'; Alex Cazumba 68'

Estádio Vila Capanema, Curitiba
Attendance: 6,277
Referee: Andrey da Silva e Silva (Pará)

=== Match 45 ===
20 February 2020
21:30

Brusque (Santa Catarina (state))	5–1	(Pará) Remo
Thiago Alagoano 39', 90+2'; Airton 58'; Neguete 76' (o.g.); Edu 77'	Report	Giovane Gomez 70'

Estádio Augusto Bauer, Brusque
Attendance: 3,892
Referee: Emerson de Almeida Ferreira (Minas Gerais)

=== Match 46 ===
4 March 2020
20:30

Brasil de Pelotas (Rio Grande do Sul)	1–0	(Amazonas (Brazilian state)) Manaus
Lázaro 27'	Report

Estádio Bento Freitas, Pelotas
Attendance: 4,840
Referee: Vinícius Gonçalves Dias Araújo (São Paulo)

=== Match 47 ===
4 March 2020
21:30

Boa Esporte (Minas Gerais)	1–1	(Minas Gerais) Cruzeiro
Claudeci 58'	Report	João Lucas 36'
Penalties
Anderson Gindré (penalty scored); Chiquinho Alagoano (penalty scored); Yuri Ferraz (penalty missed); Jefferson (penalty scored); Carlinhos (penalty scored); Reiner Ferreira (penalty missed)	4–5	(penalty scored) Edílson; (penalty scored) Machado; (penalty scored) Everton Felipe; (penalty missed) Marco Antônio; (penalty scored) Léo; (penalty scored) Maurício

Melão, Varginha
Attendance: 5,554
Referee: Marcelo de Lima Henrique (Rio de Janeiro)

=== Match 48 ===
19 February 2020
19:15

Paysandu (Pará)	1–1	(Alagoas) CRB
Caíque Oliveira 45+2'	Report	Léo Gamalho 45' (pen.)
Penalties
Alex Maranhão (penalty scored); Tony (penalty scored); Micael (penalty missed); Elielton (penalty scored)	3–5	(penalty scored) Erik Nascimento; (penalty scored) Igor; (penalty scored) Léo Gamalho; (penalty scored) Carlos Jatobá; (penalty scored) Rafael Longuine

Estádio da Curuzú, Belém
Attendance: 10,963
Referee: Paulo Roberto Alves Júnior (Paraná)

=== Match 49 ===
4 March 2020
19:15

Fluminense (Rio de Janeiro (state))	2–0	(Paraíba) Botafogo
Marcos Paulo 51'; Nenê 72' (pen.)	Report

Maracanã, Rio de Janeiro
Attendance: 12,619
Referee: Jefferson Ferreira de Moraes (Goiás)

=== Match 50 ===
18 February 2020
21:30

Vitória (Espírito Santo)	0–1	(Santa Catarina (state)) Figueirense
	Report	Diego Gonçalves 90+3'

Estádio Salvador Venâncio da Costa, Vitória
Attendance: 2,360
Referee: Thiago Duarte Peixoto (São Paulo)

=== Match 51 ===
27 February 2020
19:15

São José (Rio Grande do Sul)	0–0	(Santa Catarina (state)) Chapecoense
	Report
Penalties
Fábio (penalty scored); Marcão (penalty scored); Thayllon (penalty scored); Matheuzinho (penalty scored); Alexandre Camargo (penalty missed); Crystopher (penalty scored)	5–4	(penalty scored) Viní Locatelli; (penalty scored) Renato; (penalty scored) Alan Ruschel; (penalty scored) Aylon; (penalty missed) Paulinho Moccelin; (penalty missed) Lima

Estádio Passo D'Areia, Porto Alegre
Attendance: 501
Referee: Vinícius Furlan (São Paulo)

=== Match 52 ===
4 March 2020
21:30

Atlético Goianiense (Goiás)	1–1	(Pernambuco) Santa Cruz
Renato Kayzer 14'	Report	Patrick Nonato 39'
Penalties
Matheuzinho (penalty scored); Renato Kayzer (penalty scored); Matheus Vargas (penalty scored); Júnior Brandão (penalty scored)	4–3	(penalty missed) Chiquinho; (penalty scored) Fabiano; (penalty scored) Toty; (penalty scored) André; (penalty missed) William Alves

Estádio Olímpico Pedro Ludovico, Goiânia
Attendance: 4,887
Referee: Ricardo Marques (Minas Gerais)

=== Match 53 ===
5 March 2020
19:15

Vitória (Bahia)	3–1	(Sergipe) Lagarto
Vico 5', 76'; Léo Ceará 41' (pen.)	Report	Edílson 45+1'

Barradão, Salvador
Attendance: 6,247
Referee: Leonardo Ferreira Lima (Paraná)

=== Match 54 ===
19 February 2020
21:30

Oeste (São Paulo (state))	1–1	Ceará
De Paula 44'	Report	Leandro Carvalho 7'
Penalties
Roberto (penalty scored); De Paula (penalty scored); Alyson (penalty missed); Mantuan (penalty missed)	2–4	(penalty scored) Bergson; (penalty scored) Samuel Xavier; (penalty scored) Eduardo Brock; (penalty scored) Felipe Baxola

Arena Barueri, Barueri
Attendance: 579
Referee: Rodrigo D'Alonso Ferreira (Santa Catarina)

=== Match 55 ===
26 February 2020
21:30

Afogados (Pernambuco)	2–2	(Minas Gerais) Atlético Mineiro
Candinho 61'; Philip 72'	Report	Gabriel 65'; Ricardo Oliveira 78'
Penalties
Diego Ceará (penalty missed); Douglas Bomba (penalty missed); Thalison (penalty scored); Willian Gaúcho (penalty scored); Philip (penalty scored); Rodrigo (penalty scored); Eduardo Erê (penalty scored); Diego Teles (penalty scored); Heverton (penalty scored)	7–6	(penalty scored) Otero; (penalty scored) Ricardo Oliveira; (penalty missed) Allan; (penalty missed) Nathan; (penalty scored) Savarino; (penalty scored) Guga; (penalty scored) Guilherme Arana; (penalty scored) Igor Rabello; (penalty missed) Gabriel

Estádio Valdemar Viana de Araújo, Afogados da Ingazeira
Attendance: 1,978
Referee: Sávio Pereira Sampaio (Distrito Federal)

=== Match 56 ===
27 February 2020
21:30

Ponte Preta (São Paulo (state))	0–0	(Goiás) Vila Nova
	Report
Penalties
Roger (penalty scored); João Paulo (penalty scored); Vinícius Zanocelo (penalty scored); Dawhan (penalty scored); Bruno Rodrigues (penalty scored)	5–3	(penalty scored) Dimba; (penalty scored) Biancucchi; (penalty missed) Gilsinho; (penalty scored) Mário Henrique

Estádio Moisés Lucarelli, Campinas
Attendance: 2,420
Referee: Ramon Abatti Abel (Santa Catarina)

=== Match 57 ===
5 March 2020
21:30

Vasco da Gama (Rio de Janeiro (state))	1–0	(Rio Grande do Norte) ABC
Cano 60'	Report

Maracanã, Rio de Janeiro
Attendance: 31,839
Referee: Dewson Fernando Freitas da Silva (Pará)

=== Match 58 ===
4 March 2020
19:15

Santo André (São Paulo (state))	0–2	Goiás
	Report	Rafael Vaz 60'; Daniel Bessa 90+2' (pen.)

Estádio Bruno José Daniel, Santo André
Attendance: 2,099
Referee: Leandro Vuaden (Rio Grande do Sul)

=== Match 59 ===
5 March 2020
20:00

Operário Ferroviário (Paraná (state))	0–2	(Minas Gerais) América Mineiro
	Report	Rodolfo 67'; Felipe Augusto 70'

Estádio Germano Krüger, Ponta Grossa
Attendance: 4,712
Referee: Daniel Nobre Bins (Rio Grande do Sul)

=== Match 60 ===
26 February 2020
20:30

Ferroviária (São Paulo (state))	6–2	(Mato Grosso do Sul) Águia Negra
Henan 8'; Tony 33' (pen.); Claudinho 45+1', 45+3'; Max 59'; Caio Rangel 90+3'	Report	Salomão 18'; Pedro Isidoro 83'

Estádio Fonte Luminosa, Araraquara
Attendance: 1,310
Referee: Jonathan Antero Silva (Rondônia)
