= 2022 Cruzeiro EC season =

Cruzeiro
2022 season
- Owner: Ronaldo
- President: Sérgio Santos Rodrigues
- Manager: Paulo Pezzolano
- Stadium: Mineirão
- Série B: 1st
- Campeonato Mineiro: Runners-up
- Copa do Brasil: Round of 16
- Top goalscorer: League: Edu (11); All: Edu (22)
- Highest home attendance: 61,291 vs CSA (6 November, Série B)
- Lowest home attendance: 7,413 vs URT (26 January, Campeonato Mineiro)
- Average home league attendance: 41,042
- Biggest win: 5–0 vs Sergipe (23 February, Copa do Brasil)
- Biggest defeat: 0–3 vs Fluminense (12 July, Copa do Brasil)
Home colors	Away colors	Third colors

The 2022 season was the 101st in the Cruzeiro Esporte Clube's existence.

Along with the Campeonato Brasileiro Série B, the club will also compete in the Campeonato Mineiro and in the Copa do Brasil.

== Players ==
=== Squad information ===
As of 27 May 2022

Note: Flags indicate national team as defined under FIFA eligibility rules; some limited exceptions apply. Players may hold more than one non-FIFA nationality.

No.	Pos.	Nation	Player
1	GK	BRA	Rafael Cabral
3	DF	BRA	Wagner Leonardo (on loan from Santos)
4	DF	BRA	Mateus Silva
5	DF	BRA	Zé Ivaldo (on loan from Athletico Paranaense)
6	DF	BRA	Matheus Bidu (on loan from Guarani)
7	MF	URU	Leonardo Pais
8	MF	ITA	Rômulo
11	FW	BRA	Waguininho
14	DF	BRA	Eduardo Brock
15	MF	BRA	Adriano
17	FW	BRA	Rafael Silva
18	FW	BRA	Jajá (on loan from Athletico Paranaense)
19	FW	BRA	Vitor Leque
20	MF	BRA	Marco Antônio
21	MF	BRA	Pedro Castro

No.	Pos.	Nation	Player
23	MF	BRA	Machado
25	MF	BRA	Neto Moura
26	DF	BRA	Lucas Oliveira
27	GK	BRA	Gabriel Mesquita
28	MF	BRA	João Paulo
29	MF	BRA	Willian Oliveira (on loan from Ceará)
31	GK	BRA	Denivys
33	FW	BRA	Rodolfo
36	DF	BRA	Rafael Santos
42	DF	BRA	Geovane Jesus
48	MF	BRA	Daniel Junior
55	MF	BRA	Fernando Canesin
77	GK	BRA	Gabriel Brazão (on loan from Inter Milan)
90	FW	MDA	Henrique Luvannor
99	FW	BRA	Edu

=== Youth players with first team numbers ===
Note: Flags indicate national team as defined under FIFA eligibility rules; some limited exceptions apply. Players may hold more than one non-FIFA nationality.

No.	Pos.	Nation	Player
41	GK	BRA	Rodrigo Bazilio
43	DF	BRA	Paulo
44	DF	BRA	Weverton
45	MF	BRA	Ageu
46	DF	BRA	Kaiki
47	FW	BRA	Marcelinho
50	FW	BRA	Alex Matos

No.	Pos.	Nation	Player
51	GK	BRA	Ezequiel
52	MF	BRA	Miticov
53	DF	BRA	Pedrão
57	FW	BRA	Jhosefer
58	MF	BRA	Vitinho
60	MF	BRA	Breno
61	GK	BRA	Otávio

== Competitions ==
=== Overview ===
Competition	First match	Last match	Starting round	Final position	Record							
Competition	First match	Last match	Starting round	Final position	Pld	W	D	L	GF	GA	GD	Win %
Campeonato Mineiro	26 January	2 April	Matchday 1	Runners-up	14	9	1	4	26	15	+11	64.29
Copa do Brasil	23 February	12 July	First stage	Round of 16	6	3	0	3	11	7	+4	50.00
Campeonato Brasileiro Série B	8 April	6 November	Matchday 1	Winners	38	23	9	6	57	26	+31	60.53
Total					58	35	10	13	94	48	+46	60.34

Source: Competitions

=== Campeonato Mineiro ===
==== First stage ====
Pos	Team	Pld	W	D	L	GF	GA	GD	Pts	Qualification or relegation
1	Atlético Mineiro	11	9	1	1	23	5	+18	28	Knockout stage
2	Athletic Club	11	8	1	2	15	4	+11	25	Knockout stage
3	Cruzeiro	11	7	1	3	21	11	+10	22	Knockout stage
4	Caldense	11	6	0	5	12	13	−1	18	Knockout stage
5	América Mineiro	11	5	2	4	11	8	+3	17	Troféu Inconfidência

Source: FMF
Rules for classification: 1) Points; 2) Wins; 3) Goal difference; 4) Goals scored; 5) Head-to-head results (only if two teams are tied); 6) Fewest red cards received; 7) Fewest yellow cards received; 8) Draw.

26 January 1	Cruzeiro	3–0	URT	Belo Horizonte
17:00 UTC−3	Thiago 42'; Machado 56'; Edu 71'	Report		Stadium: Independência; Attendance: 7,413; Referee: Ronei Cândido Alves

30 January 2	Athletic	0–1	Cruzeiro	São João Del Rei
11:00 UTC−3		Report	Bruno José 48'	Stadium: Estádio Joaquim Portugal; Attendance: 2,303; Referee: Paulo César Zanovelli

2 February 3	Cruzeiro	0–2	América Mineiro	Belo Horizonte
21:30 UTC−3		Report	Patric 24'; Alê 32'	Stadium: Mineirão; Attendance: 18,835; Referee: Ricardo Marques Ribeiro

5 February 4	Caldense	1–2	Cruzeiro	Poços de Caldas
16:30 UTC−3	João Diogo 13'	Report	Giovanni 74'; Edu 90+7'	Stadium: Ronaldão; Attendance: 5,128; Referee: Felipe Fernandes de Lima

9 February 5	Cruzeiro	1–0	Democrata GV	Belo Horizonte
18:00 UTC−3	Edu 90+9'	Report		Stadium: Mineirão; Attendance: 12,311; Referee: Wanderson Alves de Sousa

12 February 6	Tombense	0–3	Cruzeiro	Tombos
19:00 UTC−3		Report	Daniel Junior 19'; Giovanni 47'; Thiago 90+2'	Stadium: Almeidão; Attendance: 1,761; Referee: Marco Aurélio Augusto Fazekas Ferreira

17 February 7	Cruzeiro	2–1	Uberlândia	Belo Horizonte
20:00 UTC−3	Bidu 38'; Edu 56'	Report	Naílson 55'	Stadium: Independência; Attendance: 9,039; Referee: Murilo Francisco Misson Junior

20 February 8	Cruzeiro	2–2	Villa Nova	Belo Horizonte
11:00 UTC−3	Vitor Roque 18'; Edu 60'	Report	Geovane Jesus 17' (o.g.); Wesley 34'	Stadium: Independência; Attendance: 19,616; Referee: Antônio Márcio Teixeira da Silva

6 March 9	Atlético Mineiro	2–1	Cruzeiro	Belo Horizonte
18:00 UTC−3	Hulk 85' (pen.); Ademir 90+7'	Report	Vitor Roque 70'	Stadium: Mineirão; Attendance: 53,328; Referee: Igor Júnior Benevenuto

13 March 10	Cruzeiro	5–1	Pouso Alegre	Belo Horizonte
17:30 UTC−3	Daniel Junior 36'; Waguininho 45'; João Paulo 55' (pen.), 87' (pen.); Rafael Santos 90'	Report	Carlinhos 41'	Stadium: Mineirão; Attendance: 23,347; Referee: Emerson de Almeida Ferreira

19 March 11	Patrocinense	2–1	Cruzeiro	Patrocínio
16:30 UTC−3	Jônatas Obina 42'; Samuel Toscas 44'	Report	Adriano Firmino 45+3'	Stadium: Estádio Pedro Alves do Nascimento; Attendance: 2,745; Referee: Marco Aurélio Augusto Fazekas Ferreira

==== Knockout stage ====
===== Semi-finals =====
22 March First leg	Cruzeiro	2–0	Athletic	Belo Horizonte
20:30 UTC−3	Eduardo Brock 7'; Edu 49'	Report		Stadium: Mineirão; Attendance: 22,340; Referee: Felipe Fernandes de Lima

26 March Second leg	Athletic	1–2 (1–4 agg.)	Cruzeiro	Belo Horizonte
16:30 UTC−3	Rafhael Lucas 43' (pen.)	Report	João Paulo 36'; Vitor Roque 45'	Stadium: Mineirão; Referee: Marco Aurélio Augusto Fazekas Ferreira

===== Final =====
2 April Single match	Atlético Mineiro	3–1	Cruzeiro	Belo Horizonte
16:30 UTC−3	Hulk 31', 81' (pen.); Nacho Fernández 65'	Report	Edu 90'	Stadium: Mineirão; Attendance: 53,572; Referee: Felipe Fernandes de Lima

=== Campeonato Brasileiro Série B ===
==== League table ====
Pos	Team	Pld	W	D	L	GF	GA	GD	Pts	Promotion or relegation
1	Cruzeiro (C, P)	38	23	9	6	57	26	+31	78	Promotion to 2023 Campeonato Brasileiro Série A
2	Grêmio (P)	38	17	14	7	50	26	+24	65	Promotion to 2023 Campeonato Brasileiro Série A
3	Bahia (P)	38	17	11	10	43	29	+14	62	Promotion to 2023 Campeonato Brasileiro Série A
4	Vasco da Gama (P)	38	17	11	10	48	36	+12	62	Promotion to 2023 Campeonato Brasileiro Série A
5	Sampaio Corrêa	38	16	10	12	48	42	+6	58	

Source: CBF
Rules for classification: 1) points; 2) wins; 3) goal difference; 4) goals scored; 5) head-to-head results (only between 2 teams); 6) fewest red cards; 7) fewest yellow cards; 8) drawing of lots.
(C) Champions; (P) Promoted

==== Results by round ====
Round	1	2	3	4	5	6	7	8	9	10	11	12	13	14	15	16	17	18	19	20	21	22	23	24	25	26	27	28	29	30	31	32	33	34	35	36	37	38
Ground	A	H	A	H	A	H	A	H	A	A	H	A	H	A	H	H	A	H	A	H	A	H	A	H	A	H	A	H	H	A	H	A	H	A	A	H	A	H
Result	L	W	D	W	W	W	W	W	W	W	W	L	W	D	W	W	L	W	D	W	D	W	W	D	D	W	D	D	W	W	W	W	D	L	L	L	W	W
Position	20	8	10	5	3	2	1	1	1	1	1	1	1	1	1	1	1	1	1	1	1	1	1	1	1	1	1	1	1	1	1	1	1	1	1	1	1	1

Updated to match(es) played on 6 November 2022. Source: Matches
A = Away; H = Home; W = Win; D = Draw; L = Loss

==== Matches ====
8 April 1	Bahia	2–0	Cruzeiro	Salvador
21:30 UTC−3	Vítor Jacaré 57', 74'	Report		Stadium: Arena Fonte Nova; Attendance: 15,449; Referee: Ramon Abatti Abel

12 April 2	Cruzeiro	1–0	Brusque	Belo Horizonte
21:30 UTC−3	Edu 83'	Report		Stadium: Mineirão; Attendance: 19,115; Referee: Antonio Dib Moraes de Sousa

23 April 3	Tombense	1–1	Cruzeiro	Muriaé
19:00 UTC−3	Ciel 58' (pen.)	Report	Eduardo Brock 89' (pen.)	Stadium: Estádio Soares de Azevedo; Attendance: 3,433; Referee: Rodolpho Toski Marques

26 April 4	Cruzeiro	1–0	Londrina	Belo Horizonte
21:30 UTC−3	Luvannor 66'	Report		Stadium: Mineirão; Attendance: 14,074; Referee: Douglas Schwengber da Silva

30 April 5	Chapecoense	0–2	Cruzeiro	Chapecó
19:00 UTC−3		Report	Geovane Jesus 83'; Edu 90'	Stadium: Arena Condá; Attendance: 3,270; Referee: Luiz Flávio de Oliveira

8 May 6	Cruzeiro	1–0	Grêmio	Belo Horizonte
16:00 UTC−3	Rodrigo Ferreira 27' (o.g.)	Report		Stadium: Independência; Attendance: 21,831; Referee: Flávio Rodrigues de Souza

15 May 7	Náutico	0–1	Cruzeiro	Recife
16:00 UTC−3		Report	Willian Oliveira 39'	Stadium: Estádio dos Aflitos; Attendance: 6,542; Referee: Leandro Vuaden

22 May 8	Cruzeiro	2–0	Sampaio Corrêa	Belo Horizonte
11:00 UTC−3	Rafael Silva 47'; Edu 77'	Report		Stadium: Mineirão; Attendance: 58,397; Referee: Jefferson Ferreira de Moraes

27 May 9	Criciúma	0–1	Cruzeiro	Criciúma
21:30 UTC−3		Report	Jajá 90+3'	Stadium: Estádio Heriberto Hülse; Attendance: 15,230; Referee: Paulo Roberto Alves Júnior

3 June 10	Operário	1–2	Cruzeiro	Ponta Grossa
21:30 UTC−3	Silvinho 55'	Report	Leonardo Pais 52'; Jajá 58'	Stadium: Estádio Germano Krüger; Referee: Ramon Abatti Abel

8 June 11	Cruzeiro	2–0	CRB	Belo Horizonte
19:00 UTC−3	Edu 31'; Rafael Silva 33'	Report		Stadium: Mineirão; Attendance: 42,004; Referee: Caio Augusto Max Vieira

12 June 12	Vasco da Gama	1–0	Cruzeiro	Rio de Janeiro
16:00 UTC−3	Getúlio 24'	Report		Stadium: Maracanã; Attendance: 63,309; Referee: Anderson Daronco

16 June 13	Cruzeiro	2–0	Ponte Preta	Belo Horizonte
16:00 UTC−3	Edu 44'; Bidu 47'	Report		Stadium: Mineirão; Attendance: 58,076; Referee: Paulo Roberto Alves Júnior

28 June 15	Cruzeiro	2–1	Sport	Belo Horizonte
21:30 UTC−3	Sabino 26' (o.g.); Daniel Junior 43'	Report	Kayke 19'	Stadium: Mineirão; Attendance: 39,032; Referee: Leandro Vuaden

1 July 16	Cruzeiro	2–0	Vila Nova	Belo Horizonte
21:30 UTC−3	Wagner Leonardo 9'; Henrique Luvannor 46'	Report		Stadium: Mineirão; Attendance: 34,957; Referee: Edina Alves Batista

5 July 14	Ituano	1–1	Cruzeiro	Itu
19:00 UTC−3	Bernardo Schappo 79'	Report	Pegorari 55' (o.g.)	Stadium: Estádio Novelli Júnior; Attendance: 5,890; Referee: Bruno Alreu de Araújo

9 July 17	Guarani	1–0	Cruzeiro	Campinas
11:00 UTC−3	Mateus Ludke 12'	Report		Stadium: Estádio Brinco de Ouro; Attendance: 6,795; Referee: Jean Pierre Gonçalves Lima

17 July 18	Cruzeiro	2–1	Novorizontino	Belo Horizonte
16:00 UTC−3	Adriano 21'; Rafael Silva 83'	Report	Quirino 74'	Stadium: Mineirão; Attendance: 46,890; Referee: Bráulio da Silva Machado

20 July 19	CSA	1–1	Cruzeiro	Maceió
19:00 UTC−3	Lucas Barcelos 47'	Report	Henrique Luvannor 14'	Stadium: Estádio Rei Pelé; Referee: Flávio Rodrigues de Souza

23 July 20	Cruzeiro	1–0	Bahia	Belo Horizonte
16:00 UTC−3	Stênio 67'	Report		Stadium: Mineirão; Attendance: 49,066; Referee: Luiz Flávio de Oliveira

30 July 21	Brusque	0–0	Cruzeiro	Brusque
11:00 UTC−3		Report		Stadium: Estádio Augusto Bauer; Referee: Paulo Roberto Alves Júnior

6 August 22	Cruzeiro	2–0	Tombense	Belo Horizonte
19:00 UTC−3	Bruno Rodrigues 49'; Daniel Junior 69'	Report		Stadium: Mineirão; Attendance: 42,274; Referee: André Luiz de Freitas Castro

9 August 23	Londrina	1–2	Cruzeiro	Londrina
21:30 UTC−3	Mandaca 67'	Report	Saimon 85' (o.g.); Rodolfo 90+5'	Stadium: Estádio do Café; Referee: Marcelo de Lima Henrique

13 August 24	Cruzeiro	1–1	Chapecoense	Brasília
16:30 UTC−3	Lucas Oliveira 49'	Report	Felipe Ferreira 6'	Stadium: Estádio Mané Garrincha; Attendance: 22,432; Referee: Sávio Pereira Sampaio

21 August 25	Grêmio	2–2	Cruzeiro	Porto Alegre
16:00 UTC−3	Diego Souza 45+3'; Bitello 46'	Report	Henrique Luvannor 17'; Rafael Silva 73'	Stadium: Arena do Grêmio; Attendance: 51,618; Referee: Bráulio da Silva Machado

26 August 26	Cruzeiro	4–0	Náutico	Belo Horizonte
21:30 UTC−3	Edu 25'; Eduardo Brock 68'; Lincoln 81' (pen.); Jajá 87'	Report		Stadium: Independência; Attendance: 21,228; Referee: Rodolpho Toski Marques

30 August 27	Sampaio Corrêa	1–1	Cruzeiro	São Luís
19:00 UTC−3	Paulo Sérgio 45+2'	Report	Edu 1'	Stadium: Castelão; Attendance: 16,080; Referee: Edina Alves Batista

4 September 28	Cruzeiro	1–1	Criciúma	Belo Horizonte
16:00 UTC−3	Bruno Rodrigues 90+1'	Report	Hyogr 40'	Stadium: Mineirão; Attendance: 58,702; Referee: Marielson Alves Silva

8 September 29	Cruzeiro	1–0	Operário	Belo Horizonte
21:30 UTC−3	Edu 45+2'	Report		Stadium: Mineirão; Attendance: 52,751; Referee: Douglas Marques das Flores

17 September 30	CRB	0–2	Cruzeiro	Maceió
20:30 UTC−3		Report	Stênio 53'; Bruno Rodrigues 90+1'	Stadium: Estádio Rei Pelé; Attendance: 6,656; Referee: Vinícius Gonçalves Dias Araújo

21 September 31	Cruzeiro	3–0	Vasco da Gama	Belo Horizonte
21:00 UTC−3	Machado 25'; Edu 60'; Henrique Luvannor 86'	Report		Stadium: Mineirão; Attendance: 59,204; Referee: Flávio Rodrigues de Souza

28 September 32	Ponte Preta	1–4	Cruzeiro	Campinas
19:00 UTC−3	Felipe Amaral 18'	Report	Zé Ivaldo 45+2'; Edu 67'; Rafael Silva 81', 89'	Stadium: Estádio Moisés Lucarelli; Referee: Ramon Abatti Abel

5 October 33	Cruzeiro	1–1	Ituano	Belo Horizonte
21:30 UTC−3	Edu 6'	Report	Gabriel Barros 9'	Stadium: Mineirão; Attendance: 56,889; Referee: Marielson Alves Silva

9 October 34	Sport	3–1	Cruzeiro	Recife
16:00 UTC−3	Chico 21'; Vágner Love 40'; Facundo Labandeira 78'	Report	Bruno Rodrigues 56'	Stadium: Ilha do Retiro; Attendance: 19,600; Referee: Sávio Pereira Sampaio

14 October 35	Vila Nova	1–0	Cruzeiro	Goiânia
20:30 UTC−3	Matheuzinho 73'	Report		Stadium: Estádio Onésio Brasileiro Alvarenga; Attendance: 10,000; Referee: Leandro Vuaden

18 October 36	Cruzeiro	0–1	Guarani	Belo Horizonte
21:30 UTC−3		Report	Isaque Elias 56'	Stadium: Mineirão; Attendance: 21,491; Referee: Wagner do Nascimento Magalhães

27 October 37	Novorizontino	1–4	Cruzeiro	Novo Horizonte
19:00 UTC−3	Danielzinho 3'	Report	Pedro Castro 21'; Willian Oliveira 27'; Bidu 51'; Jajá 64'	Stadium: Estádio Doutor Jorge Ismael de Biasi; Referee: Marcelo de Limma Henrique

6 November 38	Cruzeiro	3–2	CSA	Belo Horizonte
18:30 UTC−3	Geovane Jesus 40'; Rômulo 89'; Luvannor 90+1'	Report	Lourenço 22'; Lucas Barcellos 81'	Stadium: Mineirão; Attendance: 61,291; Referee: Jean Pierre Gonçalves Lima

=== Copa do Brasil ===
==== First stage ====
23 February Single match	Sergipe	0–5	Cruzeiro	Aracaju
21:30 UTC−3		Report	Edu 52'; João Paulo 69'; Thiago 73'; Vitor Roque 84', 87'	Stadium: Batistão; Attendance: 1,472; Referee: Douglas Schwengber da Silva

==== Second stage ====
16 March Single match	Tuntum	0–3	Cruzeiro	Tuntum
20:30 UTC−3		Report	Vitor Roque 12'; Edu 51' (pen.), 65'	Stadium: Estádio Rafael Seabra; Attendance: 2,954; Referee: Thiago Luis Scarascati

==== Third stage ====
19 April First leg	Remo	2–1	Cruzeiro	Belém
21:30 UTC−3	Marlon 70'; Daniel Felipe 77'	Report	Rodolfo 66'	Stadium: Baenão; Attendance: 12,577; Referee: Marcelo de Lima Henrique

12 May Second leg	Cruzeiro	1–0 (2–2 agg.) (5–4 p)	Remo	Belo Horizonte
19:30 UTC−3	Edu 75'	Report		Stadium: Independência; Attendance: 19,893; Referee: Raphael Claus
	Penalties
	Edu (penalty missed); Eduardo Brock (penalty scored); Rodolfo (penalty scored); Daniel Junior (penalty scored); Rafael Silva (penalty missed); Zé Ivaldo (penalty missed); Lucas Oliveira (penalty scored); Rafael Santos (penalty scored)		Marlon (penalty missed); Bruno Alves (penalty scored); Vanílson (penalty scored); Leonan (penalty missed); Paulinho Curuá (penalty scored); Laílson (penalty missed); Anderson Uchôa (penalty scored); Everton Sena (penalty missed)

==== Round of 16 ====
23 June First leg	Fluminense	2–1	Cruzeiro	Rio de Janeiro
19:00 UTC−3	Manoel 45+1'; Cano 56'	Report	Lucas Oliveira 45+7'	Stadium: Maracanã; Attendance: 46,325; Referee: André Luiz de Freitas Castro

12 July Second leg	Cruzeiro	0–3 (1–5 agg.)	Fluminense	Belo Horizonte
21:00 UTC−3		Report	Arias 70'; Cano 85'; Nathan 90+3'	Stadium: Mineirão; Attendance: 58,844; Referee: Raphael Claus
