= 2020 Copa do Brasil =

Tournament details
- Country: Brazil
- Dates: 5 February 2020 – 7 March 2021
- Teams: 91

Final positions
- Champions: Palmeiras (4th title)
- Runners-up: Grêmio

Tournament statistics
- Matches played: 120
- Goals scored: 265 (2.21 per match)
- Top goal scorer(s): Brenner; Léo Gamalho; Nenê; Rodolfo (6 goals each)

Awards
- Best player: Raphael Veiga (Palmeiras)

The 2020 Copa do Brasil (officially the Copa Continental Pneus do Brasil 2020 for sponsorship reasons) was the 32nd edition of the Copa do Brasil football competition. It was held between 5 February 2020 and 7 March 2021.

On 15 March 2020, CBF suspended the competition indefinitely due to the COVID-19 pandemic. Four months later, on 9 July 2020, they announced that the tournament would resume on 26 August 2020. The end of the tournament originally scheduled for 16 September 2020 was rescheduled to 17 February 2021, but due to the qualification of the finalist Palmeiras for the 2020 FIFA Club World Cup, the end of the competition was rescheduled again to 7 March 2021.

The competition was contested by 91 teams, either qualified by participating in their respective state championships (70), by the 2020 CBF ranking (10), by the 2019 Copa do Nordeste (1), by the 2019 Copa Verde (1), by the 2019 Série B (1) or those qualified for 2020 Copa Libertadores (8).

Palmeiras defeated Grêmio 3–0 on aggregate in the finals to win their fourth title. As champions, Palmeiras earned the right to play in the 2021 Supercopa do Brasil. They had already qualified for the 2021 Copa Libertadores group stage and the 2021 Copa do Brasil third round by winning the 2020 Copa Libertadores.

Athletico Paranaense were the defending champions, but they were eliminated in the round of 16.

Raphael Veiga (Palmeiras) and Weverton (Palmeiras) won best player and best goalkeeper awards, respectively.

== Format ==
The competition is a single-elimination tournament, the first two rounds were played as a single match and the rest are played as a two-legged ties. Eleven teams entered in the round of 16, which were teams qualified for 2020 Copa Libertadores (8), Série B champions, Copa Verde champions and Copa do Nordeste champions. The remaining 80 teams played in the first round. The 40 winners played the second round, the 20 winners played the third round, and the 10 winners played the fourth round. Finally, the five fourth round winners qualified for the round of 16.

== Qualified teams ==
Teams in bold were qualified directly for the round of 16.

| Association | Team | Qualification method |
|---|---|---|
| (Acre (state)) Acre; 2 berths | Atlético Acreano | 2019 Campeonato Acriano champions |
| (Acre (state)) Acre; 2 berths | Galvez | 2019 Campeonato Acriano runners-up |
| (Alagoas) Alagoas; 3 berths | CSA | 2019 Campeonato Alagoano champions |
| (Alagoas) Alagoas; 3 berths | CRB | 2019 Campeonato Alagoano runners-up |
| (Alagoas) Alagoas; 3 berths | Coruripe | 2019 Campeonato Alagoano 3rd place |
| (Amapá) Amapá; 1 berth | Santos | 2019 Campeonato Amapaense champions |
| (Amazonas (Brazilian state)) Amazonas; 2 berths | Manaus | 2019 Campeonato Amazonense champions |
| (Amazonas (Brazilian state)) Amazonas; 2 berths | Fast Clube | 2019 Campeonato Amazonense runners-up |
| (Bahia) Bahia; 3 + 1 berths | Bahia | 2019 Campeonato Baiano champions |
| (Bahia) Bahia; 3 + 1 berths | Bahia de Feira | 2019 Campeonato Baiano runners-up |
| (Bahia) Bahia; 3 + 1 berths | Atlético de Alagoinhas | 2019 Campeonato Baiano 3rd place |
| (Bahia) Bahia; 3 + 1 berths | Vitória | 2nd best placed team in the 2019 CBF ranking not already qualified |
| (Ceará) Ceará; 3 + 1 berths | **Fortaleza** | **2019 Copa do Nordeste champions** |
| (Ceará) Ceará; 3 + 1 berths | Ceará | 2019 Campeonato Cearense runners-up |
| (Ceará) Ceará; 3 + 1 berths | Barbalha | 2019 Campeonato Cearense first stage winners |
| (Ceará) Ceará; 3 + 1 berths | Caucaia | 2019 Copa Fares Lopes champions |
| (Espírito Santo) Espírito Santo; 1 berth | Vitória | 2019 Campeonato Capixaba champions |
| (Federal District (Brazil)) Federal District; 2 berths | Gama | 2019 Campeonato Brasiliense champions |
| (Federal District (Brazil)) Federal District; 2 berths | Brasiliense | 2019 Campeonato Brasiliense runners-up |
| (Goiás) Goiás; 3 berths | Atlético Goianiense | 2019 Campeonato Goiano champions |
| (Goiás) Goiás; 3 berths | Goiás | 2019 Campeonato Goiano runners-up |
| (Goiás) Goiás; 3 berths | Vila Nova | 2019 Campeonato Goiano 3rd place |
| (Maranhão) Maranhão; 3 berths | Imperatriz | 2019 Campeonato Maranhense champions |
| (Maranhão) Maranhão; 3 berths | Moto Club | 2019 Campeonato Maranhense runners-up |
| (Maranhão) Maranhão; 3 berths | Sampaio Corrêa | 2019 Campeonato Maranhense 3rd place |
| (Mato Grosso) Mato Grosso; 3 + 1 berths | **Cuiabá** | **2019 Copa Verde champions** |
| (Mato Grosso) Mato Grosso; 3 + 1 berths | CEOV | 2019 Campeonato Mato-Grossense runners-up |
| (Mato Grosso) Mato Grosso; 3 + 1 berths | União Rondonópolis | 2019 Campeonato Mato-Grossense 3rd place |
| (Mato Grosso) Mato Grosso; 3 + 1 berths | Luverdense | 2019 Copa FMF champions |
| Mato Grosso do Sul 2 berths | Águia Negra | 2019 Campeonato Sul-Mato-Grossense champions |
| Mato Grosso do Sul 2 berths | Aquidauanense | 2019 Campeonato Sul-Mato-Grossense runners-up |
| (Minas Gerais) Minas Gerais; 4 berths | Cruzeiro | 2019 Campeonato Mineiro champions |
| (Minas Gerais) Minas Gerais; 4 berths | Atlético Mineiro | 2019 Campeonato Mineiro runners-up |
| (Minas Gerais) Minas Gerais; 4 berths | América Mineiro | 2019 Campeonato Mineiro 3rd place |
| (Minas Gerais) Minas Gerais; 4 berths | Boa Esporte | 2019 Campeonato Mineiro 4th place |
| (Pará) Pará; 3 + 1 berths | Remo | 2019 Campeonato Paraense champions |
| (Pará) Pará; 3 + 1 berths | Independente | 2019 Campeonato Paraense runners-up |
| (Pará) Pará; 3 + 1 berths | Bragantino | 2019 Campeonato Paraense 3rd place |
| (Pará) Pará; 3 + 1 berths | Paysandu | 5th best placed team in the 2019 CBF ranking not already qualified |
| (Paraíba) Paraíba; 2 berths | Botafogo | 2019 Campeonato Paraibano champions |
| (Paraíba) Paraíba; 2 berths | Campinense | 2019 Campeonato Paraibano runners-up |
| (Paraná (state)) Paraná; 4 + 1 + 1 berths | **Athletico Paranaense** | **2019 Copa do Brasil champions** |
| (Paraná (state)) Paraná; 4 + 1 + 1 berths | Toledo | 2019 Campeonato Paranaense runners-up |
| (Paraná (state)) Paraná; 4 + 1 + 1 berths | Coritiba | 2019 Campeonato Paranaense 3rd place |
| (Paraná (state)) Paraná; 4 + 1 + 1 berths | Londrina | 2019 Campeonato Paranaense 4th place |
| (Paraná (state)) Paraná; 4 + 1 + 1 berths | Operário Ferroviário | 2019 Campeonato Paranaense 5th place |
| (Paraná (state)) Paraná; 4 + 1 + 1 berths | Paraná | 3rd best placed team in the 2019 CBF ranking not already qualified |
| (Pernambuco) Pernambuco; 3 + 1 berths | Sport | 2019 Campeonato Pernambucano champions |
| (Pernambuco) Pernambuco; 3 + 1 berths | Náutico | 2019 Campeonato Pernambucano runners-up |
| (Pernambuco) Pernambuco; 3 + 1 berths | Afogados | 2019 Campeonato Pernambucano 3rd place |
| (Pernambuco) Pernambuco; 3 + 1 berths | Santa Cruz | 7th best placed team in the 2019 CBF ranking not already qualified |
| (Piauí) Piauí; 2 berths | Ríver | 2019 Campeonato Piauiense champions |
| (Piauí) Piauí; 2 berths | Altos | 2019 Campeonato Piauiense runners-up |
| (Rio de Janeiro (state)) Rio de Janeiro; 5 + 1 + 1 berths | **Flamengo** | **2019 Copa Libertadores champions** |
| (Rio de Janeiro (state)) Rio de Janeiro; 5 + 1 + 1 berths | Vasco da Gama | 2019 Campeonato Carioca runners-up |
| (Rio de Janeiro (state)) Rio de Janeiro; 5 + 1 + 1 berths | Bangu | 2019 Campeonato Carioca 3rd place |
| (Rio de Janeiro (state)) Rio de Janeiro; 5 + 1 + 1 berths | Fluminense | 2019 Campeonato Carioca 4th place |
| (Rio de Janeiro (state)) Rio de Janeiro; 5 + 1 + 1 berths | Volta Redonda | 2019 Campeonato Carioca 5th place |
| (Rio de Janeiro (state)) Rio de Janeiro; 5 + 1 + 1 berths | Boavista^{[a]} | 2019 Copa Rio 3rd place |
| (Rio de Janeiro (state)) Rio de Janeiro; 5 + 1 + 1 berths | Botafogo | best placed team in the 2019 CBF ranking not already qualified |
| Rio Grande do Norte 2 berths | América de Natal | 2019 Campeonato Potiguar champions |
| Rio Grande do Norte 2 berths | ABC | 2019 Campeonato Potiguar runners-up |
| (Rio Grande do Sul) Rio Grande do Sul; 4 + 2 + 2 berths | **Grêmio** | **2019 Campeonato Brasileiro Série A 4th place** |
| (Rio Grande do Sul) Rio Grande do Sul; 4 + 2 + 2 berths | **Internacional** | **2019 Campeonato Brasileiro Série A 7th place** |
| (Rio Grande do Sul) Rio Grande do Sul; 4 + 2 + 2 berths | Caxias | 2019 Campeonato Gaúcho 3rd place |
| (Rio Grande do Sul) Rio Grande do Sul; 4 + 2 + 2 berths | São Luiz | 2019 Campeonato Gaúcho 4th place |
| (Rio Grande do Sul) Rio Grande do Sul; 4 + 2 + 2 berths | Novo Hamburgo | 2019 Campeonato Gaúcho 5th place |
| (Rio Grande do Sul) Rio Grande do Sul; 4 + 2 + 2 berths | São José | 2019 Copa FGF runners-up |
| (Rio Grande do Sul) Rio Grande do Sul; 4 + 2 + 2 berths | Juventude | 6th best placed team in the 2019 CBF ranking not already qualified |
| (Rio Grande do Sul) Rio Grande do Sul; 4 + 2 + 2 berths | Brasil de Pelotas | 10th best placed team in the 2019 CBF ranking not already qualified |
| (Rondônia) Rondônia; 1 berth | Vilhenense | 2019 Campeonato Rondoniense champions |
| (Roraima) Roraima; 1 berth | São Raimundo | 2019 Campeonato Roraimense champions |
| (Santa Catarina (state)) Santa Catarina; 3 + 2 berths | Avaí | 2019 Campeonato Catarinense champions |
| (Santa Catarina (state)) Santa Catarina; 3 + 2 berths | Chapecoense | 2019 Campeonato Catarinense runners-up |
| (Santa Catarina (state)) Santa Catarina; 3 + 2 berths | Brusque | 2019 Copa Santa Catarina champions |
| (Santa Catarina (state)) Santa Catarina; 3 + 2 berths | Figueirense | 4th best placed team in the 2019 CBF ranking not already qualified |
| (Santa Catarina (state)) Santa Catarina; 3 + 2 berths | Criciúma | 8th best placed team in the 2019 CBF ranking not already qualified |
| (São Paulo (state)) São Paulo; 5 + 5 + 1 berths | **Santos** | **2019 Campeonato Brasileiro Série A runners-up** |
| (São Paulo (state)) São Paulo; 5 + 5 + 1 berths | **Palmeiras** | **2019 Campeonato Brasileiro Série A 3rd place** |
| (São Paulo (state)) São Paulo; 5 + 5 + 1 berths | **São Paulo** | **2019 Campeonato Brasileiro Série A 6th place** |
| (São Paulo (state)) São Paulo; 5 + 5 + 1 berths | **Corinthians** | **2019 Campeonato Brasileiro Série A 8th place** |
| (São Paulo (state)) São Paulo; 5 + 5 + 1 berths | **Red Bull Bragantino**^{[b]} | **2019 Campeonato Brasileiro Série B champions** |
| (São Paulo (state)) São Paulo; 5 + 5 + 1 berths | Novorizontino | 2019 Campeonato Paulista 6th place |
| (São Paulo (state)) São Paulo; 5 + 5 + 1 berths | Ferroviária | 2019 Campeonato Paulista 7th place |
| (São Paulo (state)) São Paulo; 5 + 5 + 1 berths | Ponte Preta^{[c]} | 2019 Campeonato Paulista do Interior runners-up |
| (São Paulo (state)) São Paulo; 5 + 5 + 1 berths | Santo André | 2019 Campeonato Paulista Série A2 champions |
| (São Paulo (state)) São Paulo; 5 + 5 + 1 berths | XV de Piracicaba | 2019 Copa Paulista runners-up |
| (São Paulo (state)) São Paulo; 5 + 5 + 1 berths | Oeste | 9th best placed team in the 2019 CBF ranking not already qualified |
| (Sergipe) Sergipe; 2 berths | Freipaulistano^{[d]} | 2019 Campeonato Sergipano champions |
| (Sergipe) Sergipe; 2 berths | Lagarto | 2019 Campeonato Sergipano first stage winners |
| (Tocantins) Tocantins; 1 berth | Palmas | 2019 Campeonato Tocantinense champions |

^{a} Bonsucesso (2019 Copa Rio champions) declined to participate in the Copa do Brasil. They were replaced by the 3rd place Boavista.
^{b} Due to the partnership between Red Bull and Clube Atlético Bragantino, in the 2020 season the team was renamed as Red Bull Bragantino.
^{c} Red Bull Brasil (2019 Campeonato Paulista do Interior champions) lost their berth due to the partnership between Red Bull and Red Bull Bragantino. They were replaced by the runners-up Ponte Preta.
^{d} Associação Desportiva Frei Paulistano was renamed as Associação Desportiva Freipaulistano on 22 April 2019.

== Schedule ==
The schedule of the competition was as follows:

| Stage | First leg | Second leg |
|---|---|---|
| First round | Week 1: 5 February 2020; Week 2: 12 February 2020; Week 3: 19 February 2020; Week 4: 26 February 2020 | |
| Second round | Week 1: 19 February 2020; Week 2: 26 February 2020; Week 3: 4 March 2020 | |
| Third round | 11 March 2020 | 26 August 2020 |
| Fourth round | 16 September 2020 | 23 September 2020 |
| Round of 16 | 14 and 28 October 2020 | 25 October and 4 November 2020 |
| Quarter-finals | 11 November 2020 | 18 November 2020 |
| Semi-finals | 23 December 2020 | 30 December 2020 |
| Finals | 28 February 2021 | 7 March 2021 |

== Draw ==
The draw for the first and second rounds was held on 12 December 2019, 14:00 at CBF headquarters in Rio de Janeiro. Teams were seeded by their CBF ranking (shown in parentheses). The 80 qualified teams were divided in eight groups (A-H) with 10 teams each. The matches were drawn from the respective confronts: A vs. E; B vs. F; C vs. G; D vs. H. The lower-ranked teams hosted the first round match.

| Group A | Group B | Group C | Group D |
|---|---|---|---|
| (Minas Gerais) Cruzeiro (4); (Minas Gerais) Atlético Mineiro (7); Bahia (10); (Santa Catarina (state)) Chapecoense (12); (Rio de Janeiro (state)) Fluminense (13); (Rio de Janeiro (state)) Botafogo (14); (Rio de Janeiro (state)) Vasco da Gama (15); (Pernambuco) Sport (16); (Bahia) Vitória (17); (Minas Gerais) América Mineiro (18) | Ceará (19); Goiás (20); (São Paulo (state)) Ponte Preta (21); (Santa Catarina (state)) Avaí (22); (Paraná (state)) Coritiba (24); (Goiás) Atlético Goianiense (25); (Paraná (state)) Paraná (26); (Santa Catarina (state)) Figueirense (27); (Pará) Paysandu (28); (Rio Grande do Sul) Juventude (29) | (Alagoas) CSA (30); (Paraná (state)) Londrina (31); (Alagoas) CRB (32); (Goiás) Vila Nova (33); (Pernambuco) Santa Cruz (34); (Maranhão) Sampaio Corrêa (35); (Santa Catarina (state)) Criciúma (36); (São Paulo (state)) Oeste (38); (Rio Grande do Sul) Brasil de Pelotas (39); (Mato Grosso) Luverdense (40) | (Pernambuco) Náutico (41); (Minas Gerais) Boa Esporte (44); (Rio Grande do Norte) ABC (45); (Paraíba) Botafogo (47); (Paraná (state)) Operário Ferroviário (50); (Pará) Remo (53); (Rio de Janeiro (state)) Volta Redonda (56); (Acre (state)) Atlético Acreano (60); (Rio Grande do Norte) América de Natal (62); (Rio Grande do Sul) São José (63) |
| Group E | Group F | Group G | Group H |
| (Maranhão) Moto Club (65); (Santa Catarina (state)) Brusque (66); (Maranhão) Imperatriz (67); (Paraíba) Campinense (70); (Piauí) Altos (71); (Amapá) Santos (77); (Piauí) Ríver (79); (Rio Grande do Sul) Caxias (84); (Rio de Janeiro (state)) Boavista (85); (Roraima) São Raimundo (88) | (Amazonas (Brazilian state)) Manaus (89); (Federal District (Brazil)) Brasiliense (94); (São Paulo (state)) Ferroviária (99); (Rio Grande do Sul) Novo Hamburgo (105); (Alagoas) Coruripe (109); (Pará) Bragantino (110); (Amazonas (Brazilian state)) Fast Clube (111); (São Paulo (state)) Novorizontino (113); (Tocantins) Palmas (118); (Mato Grosso) União Rondonópolis (119) | (Acre (state)) Galvez (123); (Pará) Independente (129); (Espírito Santo) Vitória (151); Bahia de Feira (160); (Federal District (Brazil)) Gama (160); (São Paulo (state)) XV de Piracicaba (189); (Rio de Janeiro (state)) Bangu (189); (Mato Grosso) CEOV (198); (São Paulo (state)) Santo André (210); (Mato Grosso do Sul) Águia Negra (220) | (Rio Grande do Sul) São Luiz (no rank); (Paraná (state)) Toledo (no rank); (Bahia) Atlético de Alagoinhas (no rank); (Pernambuco) Afogados (no rank); (Ceará) Barbalha (no rank); (Ceará) Caucaia (no rank); (Sergipe) Freipaulistano (no rank); (Sergipe) Lagarto (no rank); (Mato Grosso do Sul) Aquidauanense (no rank); (Rondônia) Vilhenense (no rank) |

== First round ==
In the first round, each tie was played on a single-legged basis. The lower-ranked team hosted the match. If tied after 90 minutes, the higher-ranked team would automatically advance to second round.

| Team 1 | Score | Team 2 |
|---|---|---|
| Ríver (Piauí) | 1–0 | Bahia |
| São Luiz (Rio Grande do Sul) | 0–0 | (Rio Grande do Norte) América de Natal |
| Coruripe (Alagoas) | 0–0 | (Rio Grande do Sul) Juventude |
| XV de Piracicaba (São Paulo (state)) | 1–0 | (Paraná (state)) Londrina |
| Caxias (Rio Grande do Sul) | 1–1 | (Rio de Janeiro (state)) Botafogo |
| Toledo (Paraná (state)) | 0–2 | (Pernambuco) Náutico |
| Palmas (Tocantins) | 0–2 | (Paraná (state)) Paraná |
| Bahia de Feira | 3–1 | (Mato Grosso) Luverdense |
| Brusque (Santa Catarina (state)) | 2–1 | (Pernambuco) Sport |
| Freipaulistano (Sergipe) | 1–2 | (Pará) Remo |
| Manaus (Amazonas (Brazilian state)) | 1–0 | (Paraná (state)) Coritiba |
| Gama (Federal District (Brazil)) | 3–3 | (Rio Grande do Sul) Brasil de Pelotas |
| São Raimundo (Roraima) | 2–2 | (Minas Gerais) Cruzeiro |
| Vilhenense (Rondônia) | 1–1 | (Minas Gerais) Boa Esporte |
| Brasiliense (Federal District (Brazil)) | 1–1 | (Pará) Paysandu |
| Independente (Pará) | 2–3 | (Alagoas) CRB |
| Moto Club (Maranhão) | 2–4 | (Rio de Janeiro (state)) Fluminense |
| Atlético de Alagoinhas (Bahia) | 0–0 | (Paraíba) Botafogo |
| Novorizontino (São Paulo (state)) | 1–2 | (Santa Catarina (state)) Figueirense |
| Vitória (Espírito Santo) | 2–1 | (Alagoas) CSA |
| Boavista (Rio de Janeiro (state)) | 0–2 | (Santa Catarina (state)) Chapecoense |
| Caucaia (Ceará) | 1–2 | (Rio Grande do Sul) São José |
| União Rondonópolis (Mato Grosso) | 0–1 | (Goiás) Atlético Goianiense |
| CEOV (Mato Grosso) | 0–0 | (Pernambuco) Santa Cruz |
| Imperatriz (Maranhão) | 0–0 | (Bahia) Vitória |
| Lagarto (Sergipe) | 1–0 | (Rio de Janeiro (state)) Volta Redonda |
| Bragantino (Pará) | 1–2 | Ceará |
| Bangu (Rio de Janeiro (state)) | 1–1 | (São Paulo (state)) Oeste |
| Campinense (Paraíba) | 0–0 | (Minas Gerais) Atlético Mineiro |
| Afogados (Pernambuco) | 3–0 | (Acre (state)) Atlético Acreano |
| Novo Hamburgo (Rio Grande do Sul) | 1–2 | (São Paulo (state)) Ponte Preta |
| Galvez (Acre (state)) | 0–1 | (Goiás) Vila Nova |
| Altos (Piauí) | 1–1 | (Rio de Janeiro (state)) Vasco da Gama |
| Aquidauanense (Mato Grosso do Sul) | 0–1 | (Rio Grande do Norte) ABC |
| Fast Clube (Amazonas (Brazilian state)) | 0–2 | Goiás |
| Santo André (São Paulo (state)) | 4–1 | (Santa Catarina (state)) Criciúma |
| Santos (Amapá) | 1–1 | (Minas Gerais) América Mineiro |
| Barbalha (Ceará) | 0–3 | (Paraná (state)) Operário Ferroviário |
| Ferroviária (São Paulo (state)) | 2–0 | (Santa Catarina (state)) Avaí |
| Águia Negra (Mato Grosso do Sul) | 2–1 | (Maranhão) Sampaio Corrêa |

== Second round ==
In the second round, each tie was played on a single-legged basis. If the score was level, the match would go straight to the penalty shoot-out to determine the winner.

| Team 1 | Score | Team 2 |
|---|---|---|
| Ríver (Piauí) | 1–1 (3–4 p) | (Rio Grande do Norte) América de Natal |
| XV de Piracicaba (São Paulo (state)) | 1–1 (7–8 p) | (Rio Grande do Sul) Juventude |
| Náutico (Pernambuco) | 1–1 (3–4 p) | (Rio de Janeiro (state)) Botafogo |
| Paraná (Paraná (state)) | 3–2 | Bahia de Feira |
| Brusque (Santa Catarina (state)) | 5–1 | (Pará) Remo |
| Brasil de Pelotas (Rio Grande do Sul) | 1–0 | (Amazonas (Brazilian state)) Manaus |
| Boa Esporte (Minas Gerais) | 1–1 (4–5 p) | (Minas Gerais) Cruzeiro |
| Paysandu (Pará) | 1–1 (3–5 p) | (Alagoas) CRB |
| Fluminense (Rio de Janeiro (state)) | 2–0 | (Paraíba) Botafogo |
| Vitória (Espírito Santo) | 0–1 | (Santa Catarina (state)) Figueirense |
| São José (Rio Grande do Sul) | 0–0 (5–4 p) | (Santa Catarina (state)) Chapecoense |
| Atlético Goianiense (Goiás) | 1–1 (4–3 p) | (Pernambuco) Santa Cruz |
| Vitória (Bahia) | 3–1 | (Sergipe) Lagarto |
| Oeste (São Paulo (state)) | 1–1 (2–4 p) | Ceará |
| Afogados (Pernambuco) | 2–2 (7–6 p) | (Minas Gerais) Atlético Mineiro |
| Ponte Preta (São Paulo (state)) | 0–0 (5–3 p) | (Goiás) Vila Nova |
| Vasco da Gama (Rio de Janeiro (state)) | 1–0 | (Rio Grande do Norte) ABC |
| Santo André (São Paulo (state)) | 0–2 | Goiás |
| Operário Ferroviário (Paraná (state)) | 0–2 | (Minas Gerais) América Mineiro |
| Ferroviária (São Paulo (state)) | 6–2 | (Mato Grosso do Sul) Águia Negra |

== Third round ==
In the third round, each tie was played on a home-and-away two-legged basis. If the aggregate score was level, the second-leg match would go straight to the penalty shoot-out to determine the winner.

| Team 1 | Agg. | Team 2 | 1st leg | 2nd leg |
|---|---|---|---|---|
| Juventude (Rio Grande do Sul) | 2–2 (5–3 p) | (Rio Grande do Norte) América de Natal | 1–1 | 1–1 |
| Botafogo (Rio de Janeiro (state)) | 3–1 | (Paraná (state)) Paraná | 1–0 | 2–1 |
| Brasil de Pelotas (Rio Grande do Sul) | 0–2 | (Santa Catarina (state)) Brusque | 0–1 | 0–1 |
| Cruzeiro (Minas Gerais) | 1–3 | (Alagoas) CRB | 0–2 | 1–1 |
| Figueirense (Santa Catarina (state)) | 1–3 | (Rio de Janeiro (state)) Fluminense | 1–0 | 0–3 |
| Atlético Goianiense (Goiás) | 2–1 | (Rio Grande do Sul) São José | 2–0 | 0–1 |
| Ceará | 5–3 | (Bahia) Vitória | 1–0 | 4–3 |
| Ponte Preta (São Paulo (state)) | 5–0 | (Pernambuco) Afogados | 3–0 | 2–0 |
| Vasco da Gama (Rio de Janeiro (state)) | 2–2 (3–2 p) | Goiás | 0–1 | 2–1 |
| Ferroviária (São Paulo (state)) | 0–1 | (Minas Gerais) América Mineiro | 0–0 | 0–1 |

== Fourth round ==
The draw for the fourth round was held on 1 September 2020, 11:30 at CBF headquarters in Rio de Janeiro. The 10 qualified teams were drawn in a single group (CBF ranking shown in parentheses).

Group
- (Rio de Janeiro (state)) Fluminense (13)
- (Rio de Janeiro (state)) Botafogo (14)
- (Rio de Janeiro (state)) Vasco da Gama (15)
- (Minas Gerais) América Mineiro (18)
- Ceará (19)
- (São Paulo (state)) Ponte Preta (21)
- (Goiás) Atlético Goianiense (25)
- (Rio Grande do Sul) Juventude (29)
- (Alagoas) CRB (32)
- (Santa Catarina (state)) Brusque (66)

In the fourth round, each tie was played on a home-and-away two-legged basis. If the aggregate score was level, the second-leg match would go straight to the penalty shoot-out to determine the winner.

| Team 1 | Agg. | Team 2 | 1st leg | 2nd leg |
|---|---|---|---|---|
| Fluminense (Rio de Janeiro (state)) | 2–3 | (Goiás) Atlético Goianiense | 1–0 | 1–3 |
| Brusque (Santa Catarina (state)) | 1–7 | Ceará | 0–2 | 1–5 |
| Botafogo (Rio de Janeiro (state)) | 1–0 | (Rio de Janeiro (state)) Vasco da Gama | 1–0 | 0–0 |
| Ponte Preta (São Paulo (state)) | 3–5 | (Minas Gerais) América Mineiro | 2–2 | 1–3 |
| Juventude (Rio Grande do Sul) | 2–1 | (Alagoas) CRB | 2–0 | 0–1 |

== Final rounds ==
In the final rounds, each tie was played on a home-and-away two-legged basis. If the aggregate score was level, the second-leg match would go straight to the penalty shoot-out to determine the winners.

=== Bracket ===
Round of 16
(Rio de Janeiro (state)) Botafogo | 0 | 0 | 0
(Mato Grosso) Cuiabá | 1 | 0 | 1
(Rio Grande do Sul) Grêmio | 1 | 1 | 2
(Rio Grande do Sul) Juventude | 0 | 0 | 0
(Paraná (state)) Athletico Paranaense | 0 | 2 | 2
(Rio de Janeiro (state)) Flamengo | 1 | 3 | 4
(Ceará) Fortaleza | 3 | 2 | 5 (9)
(São Paulo (state)) São Paulo (p) | 3 | 2 | 5 (10)
(São Paulo (state)) Red Bull Bragantino | 1 | 0 | 1
(São Paulo (state)) Palmeiras | 3 | 1 | 4
(São Paulo (state)) Santos | 0 | 0 | 0
Ceará | 0 | 1 | 1
(Goiás) Atlético Goianiense | 1 | 1 | 2
(Rio Grande do Sul) Internacional | 2 | 2 | 4
(São Paulo (state)) Corinthians | 0 | 1 | 1
(Minas Gerais) América Mineiro | 1 | 1 | 2

Quarter-finals
(Mato Grosso) Cuiabá | 1 | 0 | 1
(Rio Grande do Sul) Grêmio | 2 | 2 | 4
(Rio de Janeiro (state)) Flamengo | 1 | 0 | 1
(São Paulo (state)) São Paulo | 2 | 3 | 5
(São Paulo (state)) Palmeiras | 3 | 2 | 5
Ceará | 0 | 2 | 2
(Rio Grande do Sul) Internacional | 0 | 1 | 1 (5)
(Minas Gerais) América Mineiro (p) | 1 | 0 | 1 (6)

Semi-finals
(Rio Grande do Sul) Grêmio | 1 | 0 | 1
(São Paulo (state)) São Paulo | 0 | 0 | 0
(São Paulo (state)) Palmeiras | 1 | 2 | 3
(Minas Gerais) América Mineiro | 1 | 0 | 1

Finals
(Rio Grande do Sul) Grêmio | 0 | 0 | 0
(São Paulo (state)) Palmeiras | 1 | 2 | 3

=== Round of 16 ===
The draw for the round of 16 was held on 1 October 2020, 11:30 at CBF headquarters in Rio de Janeiro. The 16 qualified teams were drawn in a single group (CBF ranking shown in parentheses).

Group
| (São Paulo (state)) Palmeiras (1); (Rio de Janeiro (state)) Flamengo (2); (Rio Grande do Sul) Grêmio (3); (São Paulo (state)) Santos (5); (Paraná (state)) Athletico Paranaense (6); (São Paulo (state)) Corinthians (8); (Rio Grande do Sul) Internacional (9); (São Paulo (state)) São Paulo (11) | (Rio de Janeiro (state)) Botafogo (14); (Minas Gerais) América Mineiro (18); Ceará (19); (Ceará) Fortaleza (23); (Goiás) Atlético Goianiense (25); (Rio Grande do Sul) Juventude (29); (São Paulo (state)) Red Bull Bragantino (37); (Mato Grosso) Cuiabá (43) |

The first legs were played on 14 and 27–29 October and the second legs were played on 25 October and 3–5 November 2020.

| Team 1 | Agg. | Team 2 | 1st leg | 2nd leg |
|---|---|---|---|---|
| Fortaleza (Ceará) | 5–5 (9–10 p) | (São Paulo (state)) São Paulo | 3–3 | 2–2 |
| Santos (São Paulo (state)) | 0–1 | Ceará | 0–0 | 0–1 |
| Grêmio (Rio Grande do Sul) | 2–0 | (Rio Grande do Sul) Juventude | 1–0 | 1–0 |
| Atlético Goianiense (Goiás) | 2–4 | (Rio Grande do Sul) Internacional | 1–2 | 1–2 |
| Botafogo (Rio de Janeiro (state)) | 0–1 | (Mato Grosso) Cuiabá | 0–1 | 0–0 |
| Athletico Paranaense (Paraná (state)) | 2–4 | (Rio de Janeiro (state)) Flamengo | 0–1 | 2–3 |
| Red Bull Bragantino (São Paulo (state)) | 1–4 | (São Paulo (state)) Palmeiras | 1–3 | 0–1 |
| Corinthians (São Paulo (state)) | 1–2 | (Minas Gerais) América Mineiro | 0–1 | 1–1 |

=== Quarter-finals ===
The draw for the quarter-finals was held on 6 November 2020, 11:30 at CBF headquarters in Rio de Janeiro. All teams were placed into a single group (CBF ranking shown in parentheses).

Group
- (São Paulo (state)) Palmeiras (1)
- (Rio de Janeiro (state)) Flamengo (2)
- (Rio Grande do Sul) Grêmio (3)
- (Rio Grande do Sul) Internacional (9)
- (São Paulo (state)) São Paulo (11)
- (Minas Gerais) América Mineiro (18)
- Ceará (19)
- (Mato Grosso) Cuiabá (43)

The first legs were played on 11 November and the second legs were played on 18 November 2020.

| Team 1 | Agg. | Team 2 | 1st leg | 2nd leg |
|---|---|---|---|---|
| Flamengo (Rio de Janeiro (state)) | 1–5 | (São Paulo (state)) São Paulo | 1–2 | 0–3 |
| Cuiabá (Mato Grosso) | 1–4 | (Rio Grande do Sul) Grêmio | 1–2 | 0–2 |
| Internacional (Rio Grande do Sul) | 1–1 (5–6 p) | (Minas Gerais) América Mineiro | 0–1 | 1–0 |
| Palmeiras (São Paulo (state)) | 5–2 | Ceará | 3–0 | 2–2 |

=== Semi-finals ===
The draw to determine the home-and-away teams for both legs were held on 24 November 2020, 15:00 at CBF headquarters in Rio de Janeiro. The first legs were played on 23 December and the second legs were played on 30 December 2020.

| Team 1 | Agg. | Team 2 | 1st leg | 2nd leg |
|---|---|---|---|---|
| Grêmio (Rio Grande do Sul) | 1–0 | (São Paulo (state)) São Paulo | 1–0 | 0–0 |
| Palmeiras (São Paulo (state)) | 3–1 | (Minas Gerais) América Mineiro | 1–1 | 2–0 |

=== Finals ===
The draw to determine the home-and-away teams for both legs was held on 14 January 2021, 11:30 at CBF headquarters in Rio de Janeiro.

28 February 2021
21:00

| Grêmio (Rio Grande do Sul) | 0–1 | (São Paulo (state)) Palmeiras |
|---|---|---|
| | Report | Gómez 31' |

Arena do Grêmio, Porto Alegre
Attendance: 0
Referee: Marcelo de Lima Henrique (Rio de Janeiro)

7 March 2021
18:00

| Palmeiras (São Paulo (state)) | 2–0 | (Rio Grande do Sul) Grêmio |
|---|---|---|
| Wesley 53'; Gabriel Menino 84' | Report |

Allianz Parque, São Paulo
Attendance: 0
Referee: Bruno Arleu de Araújo (Rio de Janeiro)

2020 Copa do Brasil winners
Palmeiras
4th Title

== Top goalscorers ==
| Rank | Player | Team | 1R | 2R | 3R1 | 3R2 | 4R1 | 4R2 | ⅛F1 | ⅛F2 | QF1 | QF2 | SF1 | SF2 | F1 | F2 | Total |
|---|---|---|---|---|---|---|---|---|---|---|---|---|---|---|---|---|---|
| 1 | (Brazil) Brenner | (São Paulo (state)) São Paulo | | | | | | | 2 | 2 | 2 | 0 | 0 | 0 | | | 6 |
| 1 | (Brazil) Léo Gamalho | (Alagoas) CRB | 1 | 1 | 2 | 1 | 0 | 1 | | | | | | | | | 6 |
| 1 | (Brazil) Nenê | (Rio de Janeiro (state)) Fluminense | 2 | 1 | 0 | 3 | 0 | 0 | | | | | | | | | 6 |
| 1 | (Brazil) Rodolfo | (Minas Gerais) América Mineiro | 1 | 1 | 0 | 1 | 0 | 1 | 0 | 1 | 1 | 0 | 0 | 0 | | | 6 |
| 5 | (Brazil) Diego Souza | (Rio Grande do Sul) Grêmio | | | | | | | 0 | 0 | 1 | 2 | 1 | 0 | 0 | 0 | 4 |
| 5 | (Brazil) Raphael Veiga | (São Paulo (state)) Palmeiras | | | | | | | 1 | 0 | 1 | 2 | 0 | 0 | 0 | 0 | 4 |
| 5 | (Brazil) Vinícius | Ceará | 0 | 0 | 0 | 1 | 1 | 0 | 0 | 1 | x | 1 | | | | | 4 |
| 8 | (Brazil) Luciano | (São Paulo (state)) São Paulo | | | | | | | 1 | 0 | 0 | 2 | 0 | x | | | 3 |
| 8 | (Brazil) Rafael Sóbis^{[1]} | Ceará | 0 | 0 | 1 | 0 | 0 | 2 | 0 | 0 | 0 | | | | | | 3 |
| 8 | (Brazil) Thiago Alagoano | (Santa Catarina (state)) Brusque | 0 | 2 | 1 | 0 | 0 | x | | | | | | | | | 3 |

Source:CBF

^{1} Rafael Sóbis left Ceará for Cruzeiro after the first leg of the quarter-finals.
