= 2020 Copa do Brasil third round =

The 2020 Copa do Brasil third round was the third round of the 2020 Copa do Brasil. It was played from 10 March to 27 August 2020. A total of 20 teams competed in the third round to decide ten places in the fourth round of the 2020 Copa do Brasil.

On 15 March 2020, CBF suspended the competition indefinitely due to the COVID-19 pandemic. Four months later, on 9 July 2020, they announced that the third round would be resumed behind closed doors on 26 August 2020.

== Format ==
In the third round, each tie was played on a home-and-away two-legged basis. If the aggregate score was level, the second-leg match would go straight to the penalty shoot-out to determine the winner. Host teams were settled in a draw held on 5 March 2020, 15:00 at CBF headquarters in Rio de Janeiro.

== Matches ==
All times are Brasília time, BRT (UTC−3)

Team 1	Agg.	Team 2	1st leg	2nd leg
Juventude (Rio Grande do Sul)	2–2 (5–3 p)	(Rio Grande do Norte) América de Natal	1–1	1–1
Botafogo (Rio de Janeiro (state))	3–1	(Paraná (state)) Paraná	1–0	2–1
Brasil de Pelotas (Rio Grande do Sul)	0–2	(Santa Catarina (state)) Brusque	0–1	0–1
Cruzeiro (Minas Gerais)	1–3	(Alagoas) CRB	0–2	1–1
Figueirense (Santa Catarina (state))	1–3	(Rio de Janeiro (state)) Fluminense	1–0	0–3
Atlético Goianiense (Goiás)	2–1	(Rio Grande do Sul) São José	2–0	0–1
Ceará	5–3	(Bahia) Vitória	1–0	4–3
Ponte Preta (São Paulo (state))	5–0	(Pernambuco) Afogados	3–0	2–0
Vasco da Gama (Rio de Janeiro (state))	2–2 (3–2 p)	Goiás	0–1	2–1
Ferroviária (São Paulo (state))	0–1	(Minas Gerais) América Mineiro	0–0	0–1

=== Match 61 ===
11 March 2020
19:15

Juventude (Rio Grande do Sul)	1–1	(Rio Grande do Norte) América de Natal
Iago Dias 83'	Report	Dione 37'

Estádio Alfredo Jaconi, Caxias do Sul
Attendance: 3,433
Referee: Emerson de Almeida Ferreira (Minas Gerais)

26 August 2020
16:00

América de Natal (Rio Grande do Norte)	1–1	(Rio Grande do Sul) Juventude
Zé Eduardo 64'	Report	Odivan 38'
Penalties
Wallace Pernambucano (penalty scored); Dione (penalty scored); Anderson Paraíba (penalty scored); Renan Luís (penalty missed)	3–5	(penalty scored) Marciel; (penalty scored) Breno Lopes; (penalty scored) Capixaba; (penalty scored) Gabriel Novaes; (penalty scored) Samuel Santos

Arena das Dunas, Natal
Attendance: 0
Referee: Héber Lopes (Santa Catarina)

Tied 2–2 on aggregate, Juventude won on penalties and advanced to the fourth round.

=== Match 62 ===
10 March 2020
19:15

Botafogo (Rio de Janeiro (state))	1–0	(Paraná (state)) Paraná
Luiz Fernando 11'	Report

Estádio Olímpico Nilton Santos, Rio de Janeiro
Attendance: 22,833
Referee: Daniel Nobre Bins (Rio Grande do Sul)

26 August 2020
19:00

Paraná (Paraná (state))	1–2	(Rio de Janeiro (state)) Botafogo
Thales 55'	Report	Marcelo Benevenuto 49'; Danilo Barcelos 90+5' (pen.)

Estádio Vila Capanema, Curitiba
Attendance: 0
Referee: Vinícius Furlan (São Paulo)

Botafogo won 3–1 on aggregate and advanced to the fourth round.

=== Match 63 ===
12 March 2020
21:30

Brasil de Pelotas (Rio Grande do Sul)	0–1	(Santa Catarina (state)) Brusque
	Report	Thiago Alagoano 44'

Estádio Bento Freitas, Pelotas
Attendance: 2,776
Referee: Marcelo de Lima Henrique (Rio de Janeiro)

27 August 2020
19:00

Brusque (Santa Catarina (state))	1–0	(Rio Grande do Sul) Brasil de Pelotas
Marco Antônio 38'	Report

Estádio Augusto Bauer, Brusque
Attendance: 72
Referee: Wagner Reway (Paraíba)

Brusque won 2–0 on aggregate and advanced to the fourth round.

=== Match 64 ===
11 March 2020
21:30

Cruzeiro (Minas Gerais)	0–2	(Alagoas) CRB
	Report	Léo Gamalho 17', 58'

Mineirão, Belo Horizonte
Attendance: 13,118
Referee: Sávio Pereira Sampaio (Distrito Federal)

26 August 2020
16:00

CRB (Alagoas)	1–1	(Minas Gerais) Cruzeiro
Léo Gamalho 64'	Report	Giovanni 45'

Estádio Rei Pelé, Maceió
Attendance: 0
Referee: Vinícius Gonçalves Dias Araújo (São Paulo)

CRB won 3–1 on aggregate and advanced to the fourth round.

=== Match 65 ===
11 March 2020
19:15

Figueirense (Santa Catarina (state))	1–0	(Rio de Janeiro (state)) Fluminense
Alemão 82'	Report

Estádio Orlando Scarpelli, Florianópolis
Attendance: 8,901
Referee: Vinícius Gonçalves Dias Araújo (São Paulo)

25 August 2020
21:30

Fluminense (Rio de Janeiro (state))	3–0	(Santa Catarina (state)) Figueirense
Nenê 15', 55', 80' (pen.)	Report

Maracanã, Rio de Janeiro
Attendance: 0
Referee: Felipe Fernandes de Lima (Minas Gerais)

Fluminense won 3–1 on aggregate and advanced to the fourth round.

=== Match 66 ===
11 March 2020
21:30

Atlético Goianiense (Goiás)	2–0	(Rio Grande do Sul) São José
Nicolas 31'; Renato Kayzer 43'	Report

Estádio Olímpico Pedro Ludovico, Goiânia
Attendance: 4,116
Referee: Antônio Dib Moraes de Sousa (Piauí)

27 August 2020
21:30

São José (Rio Grande do Sul)	1–0	(Goiás) Atlético Goianiense
Marcelo 38'	Report

Estádio Passo D'Areia, Porto Alegre
Attendance: 0
Referee: Denis da Silva Ribeiro Serafim (Alagoas)

Atlético Goianiense won 2–1 on aggregate and advanced to the fourth round.

=== Match 67 ===
12 March 2020
19:15

Ceará	1–0	(Bahia) Vitória
Rafael Sóbis 44'	Report

Castelão, Fortaleza
Attendance: 17,264
Referee: André Luiz de Freitas Castro (Goiás)

26 August 2020
21:30

Vitória (Bahia)	3–4	Ceará
Léo Ceará 8'; Thiago Carleto 15' (pen.); Caicedo 65'	Report	Vinícius 45+2' (pen.); Thiago Carleto 48' (o.g.); Fernando Sobral 61'; Lima 89'

Barradão, Salvador
Attendance: 0
Referee: Paulo Roberto Alves Júnior (Paraná)

Ceará won 5–3 on aggregate and advanced to the fourth round.

=== Match 68 ===
12 March 2020
19:15

Ponte Preta (São Paulo (state))	3–0	(Pernambuco) Afogados
Heverton 37' (o.g.); Roger 52'; Bruno Reis 65'	Report

Estádio Moisés Lucarelli, Campinas
Attendance: 3,237
Referee: Alexandre Vargas Tavares de Jesus (Rio de Janeiro)

25 August 2020
16:00

Afogados (Pernambuco)	0–2	(São Paulo (state)) Ponte Preta
	Report	Zé Roberto 45+6'; Guilherme Lazaroni 67'

Estádio Valdemar Viana de Araújo, Afogados da Ingazeira
Attendance: 127
Referee: Zandick Gondim Alves Júnior (Rio Grande do Norte)

Ponte Preta won 5–0 on aggregate and advanced to the fourth round.

=== Match 69 ===
12 March 2020
21:30

Vasco da Gama (Rio de Janeiro (state))	0–1	Goiás
	Report	Fábio Sanches 43'

Estádio São Januário, Rio de Janeiro
Attendance: 17,970
Referee: Thiago Duarte Peixoto (São Paulo)

26 August 2020
21:30

Goiás	1–2	(Rio de Janeiro (state)) Vasco da Gama
Rafael Vaz 44'	Report	Henrique 32'; Benítez 50'
Penalties
Daniel Bessa (penalty missed); Rafael Vaz (penalty scored); Villalva (penalty scored); Rafael Moura (penalty missed); Marcinho (penalty missed)	2–3	(penalty scored) Cano; (penalty missed) Yago Pikachu; (penalty scored) Benítez; (penalty scored) Bruno César

Estádio da Serrinha, Goiânia
Attendance: 0
Referee: Ricardo Marques (Minas Gerais)

Tied 2–2 on aggregate, Vasco da Gama won on penalties and advanced to the fourth round.

=== Match 70 ===
11 March 2020
19:15

Ferroviária (São Paulo (state))	0–0	(Minas Gerais) América Mineiro
	Report

Estádio Fonte Luminosa, Araraquara
Attendance: 2,799
Referee: Dyorgines José Padovani de Andrade (Espírito Santo)

25 August 2020
19:00

América Mineiro (Minas Gerais)	1–0	(São Paulo (state)) Ferroviária
Rodolfo 90+3'	Report

Estádio Independência, Belo Horizonte
Attendance: 0
Referee: Marielson Alves Silva (Bahia)

América Mineiro won 1–0 on aggregate and advanced to the fourth round.
