= 2020 Copa do Brasil fourth round =

The 2020 Copa do Brasil fourth round was the fourth round of the 2020 Copa do Brasil football competition. It was played behind closed doors from 16 to 24 September 2020. A total of 10 teams competed in the fourth round to decide five places in the final rounds of the 2020 Copa do Brasil.

== Draw ==
The draw for the fourth round was held on 1 September 2020, 11:30 at CBF headquarters in Rio de Janeiro. The 10 qualified teams were drawn in a single group (CBF ranking shown in parentheses).

Group
- (Rio de Janeiro (state)) Fluminense (13)
- (Rio de Janeiro (state)) Botafogo (14)
- (Rio de Janeiro (state)) Vasco da Gama (15)
- (Minas Gerais) América Mineiro (18)
- Ceará (19)
- (São Paulo (state)) Ponte Preta (21)
- (Goiás) Atlético Goianiense (25)
- (Rio Grande do Sul) Juventude (29)
- (Alagoas) CRB (32)
- (Santa Catarina (state)) Brusque (66)

== Format ==
In the fourth round, each tie was played on a home-and-away two-legged basis. If the aggregate score was level, the second-leg match would go straight to the penalty shoot-out to determine the winner.

== Matches ==
All times are Brasília time, BRT (UTC−3)

Team 1	Agg.	Team 2	1st leg	2nd leg
Fluminense (Rio de Janeiro (state))	2–3	(Goiás) Atlético Goianiense	1–0	1–3
Brusque (Santa Catarina (state))	1–7	Ceará	0–2	1–5
Botafogo (Rio de Janeiro (state))	1–0	(Rio de Janeiro (state)) Vasco da Gama	1–0	0–0
Ponte Preta (São Paulo (state))	3–5	(Minas Gerais) América Mineiro	2–2	1–3
Juventude (Rio Grande do Sul)	2–1	(Alagoas) CRB	2–0	0–1

=== Match 71 ===
16 September 2020
21:30

Fluminense (Rio de Janeiro (state))	1–0	(Goiás) Atlético Goianiense
João Victor 76' (o.g.)	Report

Maracanã, Rio de Janeiro
Attendance: 0
Referee: Caio Max Augusto Vieira (Rio Grande do Norte)

24 September 2020
20:00

Atlético Goianiense (Goiás)	3–1	(Rio de Janeiro (state)) Fluminense
Chico 9'; Marlon Freitas 78'; Matheus Vargas 90+2'	Report	Luccas Claro 45+5'

Estádio Olímpico Pedro Ludovico, Goiânia
Attendance: 0
Referee: Sávio Pereira Sampaio (Distrito Federal)

Atlético Goianiense won 3–2 on aggregate and advanced to the round of 16.

=== Match 72 ===
16 September 2020
21:30

Brusque (Santa Catarina (state))	0–2	Ceará
	Report	Leandro Carvalho 39'; Vinícius 90+1'

Estádio Augusto Bauer, Brusque
Attendance: 46
Referee: Rodrigo Carvalhães de Miranda (Rio de Janeiro)

23 September 2020
21:30

Ceará	5–1	(Santa Catarina (state)) Brusque
Rafael Sóbis 44', 63'; Bergson 74'; Airton 78' (o.g.); Tiago 89'	Report	Alex Sandro 19' (pen.)

Castelão, Fortaleza
Attendance: 0
Referee: Denis da Silva Ribeiro Serafim (Alagoas)

Ceará won 7–1 on aggregate and advanced to the round of 16.

=== Match 73 ===
17 September 2020
19:00

Botafogo (Rio de Janeiro (state))	1–0	(Rio de Janeiro (state)) Vasco da Gama
Matheus Babi 67'	Report

Estádio Olímpico Nilton Santos, Rio de Janeiro
Attendance: 0
Referee: Ricardo Marques (Minas Gerais)

23 September 2020
21:30

Vasco da Gama (Rio de Janeiro (state))	0–0	(Rio de Janeiro (state)) Botafogo
	Report

Estádio São Januário, Rio de Janeiro
Attendance: 0
Referee: Raphael Claus (São Paulo)

Botafogo won 1–0 on aggregate and advanced to the round of 16.

=== Match 74 ===
16 September 2020
19:00

Ponte Preta (São Paulo (state))	2–2	(Minas Gerais) América Mineiro
Moisés 5'; Matheus Peixoto 74'	Report	Marcelo Toscano 43'; Felipe Azevedo 90+1'

Estádio Moisés Lucarelli, Campinas
Attendance: 0
Referee: Daniel Nobre Bins (Rio Grande do Sul)

22 September 2020
21:30

América Mineiro (Minas Gerais)	3–1	(São Paulo (state)) Ponte Preta
Felipe Azevedo 32'; Alê 36'; Rodolfo 62' (pen.)	Report	Apodi 90+2'

Estádio Independência, Belo Horizonte
Attendance: 0
Referee: Dyorgines José Padovani de Andrade (Espírito Santo)

América Mineiro won 5–3 on aggregate and advanced to the round of 16.

=== Match 75 ===
17 September 2020
16:00

Juventude (Rio Grande do Sul)	2–0	(Alagoas) CRB
Igor 33'; Wágner 80'	Report

Estádio Alfredo Jaconi, Caxias do Sul
Attendance: 0
Referee: Thiago Duarte Peixoto (São Paulo)

22 September 2020
19:00

CRB (Alagoas)	1–0	(Rio Grande do Sul) Juventude
Léo Gamalho 32' (pen.)	Report

Estádio Rei Pelé, Maceió
Attendance: 0
Referee: Felipe Fernandes de Lima (Minas Gerais)

Juventude won 2–1 on aggregate and advanced to the round of 16.
