= Denivys =

Brazilian footballer (born 2001)

Personal information
- Full name: Denivys Will da Vitória Júnior
- Date of birth: 1 May 2001 (age 25)
- Place of birth: Vitória, Brazil
- Height: 1.93 m (6 ft 4 in)
- Position: Goalkeeper

Team information
- Current team: União Santarém (on loan from Santa Clara)
- Number: 31

Youth career
- Porto Vitória
- 2015–2022: Cruzeiro

Senior career*
Years	Team	Apps	(Gls)
2022–2023	Cruzeiro	2	(0)
2023	→ Athletic-MG (loan)	5	(0)
2023	Atlético Goianiense	0	(0)
2024–	Santa Clara	0	(0)
2025–	→ União Santarém (loan)	0	(0)
- * Club domestic league appearances and goals as of 22:19, 16 November 2025 (UTC)

Denivys Will da Vitória Júnior (born 1 May 2001), simply known as Denivys, is a Brazilian professional footballer who plays as a goalkeeper for Liga 3 club União Santarém, on loan from Santa Clara. He will join Série D club Betim in January 2026.

== Club career ==
Born in Vitória, Espírito Santo, Denivys joined Cruzeiro's youth setup in 2015, from hometown side Porto Vitória. He started to train with the main squad in January 2020, after the departure of Rafael.

On 18 May 2021, Denivys renewed his contract until December 2023. On 26 January 2022, after longtime incumbent Fábio left the club and new signing Rafael Cabral was not registered in time, he made his first team debut by starting in a 3–0 Campeonato Mineiro home win over URT.

On 8 January 2024, Denivys moved to Portugal, signing a two-and-a-half-year contract, with an option for a further year, with Liga Portugal 2 club Santa Clara. At the start of the 2025–26 season, he was loaned to Liga 3 side União Santarém.

On 16 October 2025, Série D club Betim announced that Denivys will join the club at the start of the 2026 season.

== Career statistics ==
As of 20 April 2023

Appearances and goals by club, season and competition
Club	Season	League			State league		Cup		Continental		Other		Total	
Club	Season	Division	Apps	Goals	Apps	Goals	Apps	Goals	Apps	Goals	Apps	Goals	Apps	Goals
Cruzeiro	2022	Série B	0	0	2	0	0	0	—		—		2	0
Athletic-MG (loan)	2023	Série D	0	0	5	0	1	0	—		—		6	0
Atlético Goianiense	2023	Série B	0	0	—		—		—		—		0	0
Career total			0	0	7	0	1	0	0	0	0	0	8	0
