= 2019 Campeonato Paranaense =

Campeonato Paranaense
- Season: 2019
- Dates: 19 January - 21 April
- Champions: Athletico Paranaense (25th title)
- Relegated: Foz do Iguaçu; Maringá
- Copa do Brasil: Athletico Paranaense (via Copa do Brasil); Toledo; Coritiba; Londrina; Operário
- Série D: Toledo; FC Cascavel
- Matches played: 74
- Goals scored: 153 (2.07 per match)
- Top goalscorer: Rodrigão (7 goals)

The 2019 Campeonato Paranaense de Futebol was the 105th edition of the top division of football in the state of Paraná. The competition started on 19 January and ended on 21 April, and was organized by FPF.

The defending champions, Athletico Paranaense, won on penalties their 25th title after beating Toledo in the final.

== Format ==
The 12 participants were split into two groups of six, Group A and Group B, and competed in two separate tournaments.

In the first tournament, each team in Group A played the six teams in Group B once, and vice versa. The best two in each group advanced to a knockout bracket, where the best team in each group played the second-best team in each group in a single leg in the semifinals.

In the second tournament, each team played every other team in their group once, and the best two in each group advanced to a knockout bracket. The best team in each group played the second-best team in the opposite group in a single leg in the semifinals.

The winners of each tournament played in a two-legged final to determine the champion. If the same team won both tournaments, the final would not be contested. After both tournaments have been played, the points totals from each tournament were added up, and the bottom two teams were relegated to the second division. Four places were available in the 2020 Copa do Brasil, while two places (via Campeonato Paranaense) were available in the 2020 Série D.

== Participating teams ==
Club	Home city	2018 result	Titles (last)
Athletico Paranaense	Curitiba	1st	24 (2018)
Cascavel CR	Cascavel	2nd (Seg.)	0
FC Cascavel	Cascavel	8th	0
Cianorte	Cianorte	6th	0
Coritiba	Curitiba	2nd	38 (2017)
Foz do Iguaçu	Foz do Iguaçu	3rd	0
Londrina	Londrina	7th	4 (2014)
Maringá	Maringá	5th	0
Operário	Ponta Grossa	1st (Seg.)	1 (2015)
Paraná	Curitiba	4th	7 (2006)
Rio Branco	Paranaguá	10th	0
Toledo	Toledo	9th	0

== Taça Barcímio Sucipira Júnior ==
Group A

Pos	Team	Pld	W	D	L	GF	GA	GD	Pts	Qualification
1	Toledo	6	2	4	0	6	3	+3	10	Advance to Semifinals
2	Operário	6	2	3	1	6	4	+2	9	Advance to Semifinals
3	Maringá	6	2	3	1	6	5	+1	9	
4	Londrina	6	2	2	2	7	6	+1	8	
5	Athletico Paranaense	6	2	2	2	5	4	+1	8	
6	Foz do Iguaçu	6	0	1	5	0	13	−13	1	

Source: Globo
Rules for classification: 1) Wins; 2) Goal difference; 3) Goals scored; 4) Fewest red cards received; 5) Draw.

Group B

Pos	Team	Pld	W	D	L	GF	GA	GD	Pts	Qualification
1	FC Cascavel	6	3	2	1	7	3	+4	11	Advance to Semifinals
2	Coritiba	6	2	4	0	9	4	+5	10	Advance to Semifinals
3	Paraná	6	2	3	1	7	3	+4	9	
4	Cianorte	6	1	4	1	1	1	0	7	
5	Cascavel CR	6	2	0	4	5	9	−4	6	
6	Rio Branco	6	1	2	3	6	10	−4	5	

Source: Globo
Rules for classification: 1) Wins; 2) Goal difference; 3) Goals scored; 4) Fewest red cards received; 5) Draw.

=== Knockout stage ===
Semifinals
B1	FC Cascavel	0 (3)
B2	Coritiba (p)	0 (5)
A1	Toledo (p)	1 (3)
A2	Operário	1 (1)

Final
Coritiba	1 (2)
Toledo (p)	1 (3)

Taça Barcímio Sucipira Júnior winners:
Toledo
1st title

== Taça Dirceu Krüger ==
Group A

Pos	Team	Pld	W	D	L	GF	GA	GD	Pts	Qualification
1	Athletico Paranaense	5	4	0	1	18	7	+11	12	Advance to Semifinals
2	Londrina	5	3	2	0	10	5	+5	11	Advance to Semifinals
3	Operário	5	2	2	1	5	5	0	8	
4	Foz do Iguaçu	5	1	2	2	2	3	−1	5	
5	Maringá	5	1	0	4	4	9	−5	3	
6	Toledo	5	0	2	3	5	15	−10	2	

Source: Globo
Rules for classification: 1) Wins; 2) Goal difference; 3) Goals scored; 4) Fewest red cards received; 5) Draw.

Group B

Pos	Team	Pld	W	D	L	GF	GA	GD	Pts	Qualification
1	Coritiba	5	3	1	1	8	2	+6	10	Advance to Semifinals
2	Rio Branco	5	3	1	1	4	2	+2	10	Advance to Semifinals
3	Cascavel CR	5	2	1	2	4	6	−2	7	
4	Paraná	5	2	0	3	7	6	+1	6	
5	Cianorte	5	2	0	3	3	8	−5	6	
6	FC Cascavel	5	1	1	3	4	6	−2	4	

Source: Globo
Rules for classification: 1) Wins; 2) Goal difference; 3) Goals scored; 4) Fewest red cards received; 5) Draw.

=== Knockout stage ===
Semifinals
A1	Athletico Paranaense	3
B2	Rio Branco	0
B1	Coritiba	2
A2	Londrina	1

Final
Athletico Paranaense (p)	1 (7)
Coritiba	1 (6)

Taça Dirceu Krüger winners:
Athletico Paranaense
2nd title

== Grand Final ==
14 April 2019
16:00

Toledo	1–0	Athletico Paranaense
Fandinho 90+2'	Report

Estádio Municipal 14 de Dezembro, Toledo
Attendance: 3,738
Referee: Leonardo Sígari Zanon

21 April 2019
16:00

Athletico Paranaense	1–0	Toledo
Matheus Rossetto 7'	Report
Penalties
Bergson (penalty scored); Gabriel Poveda (penalty scored); Lucas Halter (penalty scored); Matheus Anjos (penalty scored); Marquinho (penalty scored); Khellven (penalty scored)	6–5	(penalty scored) Revson; (penalty scored) Jhonathan; (penalty scored) Léo Teles; (penalty scored) Guilherme Rend; (penalty scored) Júlio Pacato; (penalty missed) Adriano

Arena da Baixada, Curitiba
Attendance: 25,881
Referee: Rodolpho Toski Marques

== General table ==
Pos	Team	Pld	W	D	L	GF	GA	GD	Pts	Qualification or relegation
1	Athletico Paranaense	11	6	2	3	23	11	+12	20	Champions and 2020 Copa do Brasil
2	Toledo	11	2	6	3	11	18	−7	12	Runners-up, 2020 Copa do Brasil and 2020 Série D
3	Coritiba	11	5	5	1	17	6	+11	20	2020 Copa do Brasil
4	Londrina	11	5	4	2	17	11	+6	19	2020 Copa do Brasil
5	Operário	11	4	5	2	11	9	+2	17	2020 Copa do Brasil
6	Paraná	11	4	3	4	14	9	+5	15	
7	FC Cascavel	11	4	3	4	11	9	+2	15	2020 Série D
8	Rio Branco	11	4	3	4	10	12	−2	15	
9	Cascavel CR	11	4	1	6	9	15	−6	13	
10	Cianorte	11	3	4	4	4	9	−5	13	
11	Maringá	11	3	3	5	10	14	−4	12	Relegation to 2020 Campeonato Paranaense - Segunda Divisão
12	Foz do Iguaçu	11	1	3	7	2	16	−14	6	Relegation to 2020 Campeonato Paranaense - Segunda Divisão

Source: Globo
Rules for classification: 1) Wins; 2) Goal difference; 3) Goals scored; 4) Fewest red cards received; 5) Draw.

== Top goalscorers ==
No.	Player	Club	Goals
1	Rodrigão	Coritiba	7
2	Bergson	Athletico Paranaense	6
2	Marquinho	Athletico Paranaense	6
4	Jenison	Paraná	5
5	Germano	Londrina	4
5	Lucas Tocantins	FC Cascavel	4
