= Cayo Tenório =

Brazilian footballer (born 1999)

Personal information
- Full name: Cayo Henrique Nascimento Ferreira
- Date of birth: 22 February 1999 (age 27)
- Place of birth: Rio de Janeiro, Brazil
- Height: 1.72 m (5 ft 8 in)
- Position: Right back

Team information
- Current team: ABC

Youth career
- 2014–2020: Vasco da Gama

Senior career*
Years	Team	Apps	(Gls)
2020–2022	Vasco da Gama	31	(0)
2022	→ Azuriz (loan)	8	(1)
2023	Boavista	4	(0)
2023	Nova Iguaçu	11	(2)
2024-2025	Volta Redonda	2	(0)
2025	Rio Branco-ES	22	(0)
2026–	ABC	14	(1)
- * Club domestic league appearances and goals as of 18 November 2026

Cayo Henrique Nascimento Ferreira (born 22 February 1999), commonly known as Cayo Tenório, is a Brazilian footballer who plays as a right back for ABC.

== Career statistics ==
=== Club ===
As of 7 June 2020.

Club	Season	League			State league		Cup		Continental		Other		Total	
Club	Season	Division	Apps	Goals	Apps	Goals	Apps	Goals	Apps	Goals	Apps	Goals	Apps	Goals
Vasco da Gama	2020	Série A	0	0	3 (Note: Appearances in the Campeonato Carioca)	0	0	0	0	0	0	0	3	0
Career total			0	0	3	0	0	0	0	0	0	0	3	0
