= Isaque (footballer, born 1997) =

Brazilian footballer (born 1997)

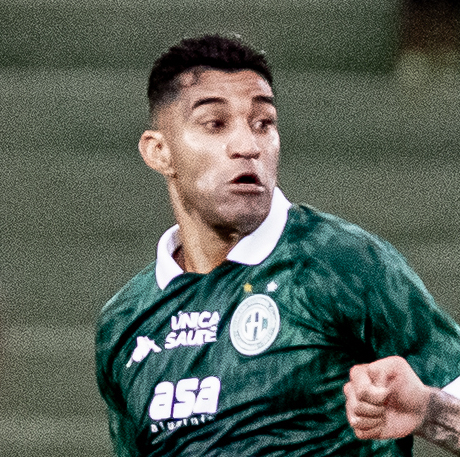
- Isaque playing for Guarani in 2026

Personal information
- Full name: Isaque Elias Brito
- Date of birth: 22 April 1997 (age 29)
- Place of birth: São Paulo, Brazil
- Height: 1.79 m (5 ft 10 in)
- Position: Attacking midfielder

Team information
- Current team: Guarani
- Number: 21

Youth career
- –2018: Grêmio

Senior career*
Years	Team	Apps	(Gls)
2018–2023	Grêmio	39	(6)
2021	→ Fortaleza (loan)	4	(1)
2021	→ América Mineiro (loan)	3	(0)
2022	→ Vasco da Gama (loan)	8	(0)
2022	→ Guarani (loan)	18	(3)
2023	Guarani	39	(3)
2024	Mirassol	22	(2)
2025–	Guarani	52	(2)
- * Club domestic league appearances and goals as of 10 November 2026

Isaque Elias Brito (born 22 April 1997), known as Isaque, is a Brazilian professional footballer who plays for Guarani. Mainly an attacking midfielder, he can also play as a striker or a left winger.

== Club career ==
=== Grêmio ===
Born in São Paulo, Isaque joined the Grêmio's Academy at the age of 20 in 2017. Isaque made his professional debut with Grêmio in a 1–1 Campeonato Gaúcho tie with São Luiz on 18 January 2018. He scored in August 2020 in the final of the second turn of the Campeonato Gaúcho against Grêmio's arch enemy Internacional.

== Career statistics ==
As of 13 October 2021.

Club	Season	League			State League		National Cup		Continental		Other		Total	
Club	Season	Division	Apps	Goals	Apps	Goals	Apps	Goals	Apps	Goals	Apps	Goals	Apps	Goals
Grêmio	2018	Série A	0	0	4	1	0	0	—		—		4	1
Grêmio	2019	Série A	2	1	—		0	0	—		—		2	1
Grêmio	2020	Série A	24	2	7	1	4	1	4 (Note: Appearance(s) in Copa Libertadores.)	0	—		39	4
Grêmio	2021	Série A	0	0	2	1	0	0	1	0	—		3	1
Grêmio	Total		26	3	13	3	4	1	5	0	—		48	7
Fortaleza (loan)	2021	Série A	0	0	4	0	1	0	—		2 (Note: Appearance(s) in Copa do Nordeste.)	0	7	0
América Mineiro (loan)	2021	Série A	3	0	—		—		—		—		3	0
Career total			29	3	17	3	5	1	5	0	2	0	57	7

== Honours ==
Grêmio

- Recopa Sudamericana: 2018
- Campeonato Gaúcho: 2018, 2019, 2020

Fortaleza

- Campeonato Cearense: 2021
