= Jacutinga Atlético Clube =

Jacutinga
- Full name: Jacutinga Atlético Clube
- Nickname(s): JAC; Boca Juniors do Sul de Minas
- Founded: April 27, 2005
- Ground: Luizão, Jacutinga, Minas Gerais state, Brazil
- Capacity: 2,500
Home colors	Away colors

Jacutinga Atlético Clube, commonly known as Jacutinga, is a Brazilian football club based in Jacutinga, Minas Gerais state.

== History ==
The club was founded on April 27, 2005. They competed in the Campeonato Mineiro Segunda Divisão in that year, finishing in the first place in the first two stages of the competitions, and in the fifth place out of six clubs in the final stage. Jacutinga competed in the Taça Minas Gerais in the same year, finishing in the first place in their group in the First Stage, but it was eliminated by Uberlândia in the Quarterfinals. The club reached the semifinals in the 2011 Copa Record (Copa Sul Mineira), an amateur competition, being eliminated by Coqueiral. The club debuted in the 2011 Campeonato Mineiro Segunda Divisão, on August 14, 2011, when they were defeated 4-0 by Santarritense, in Santa Rita do Sapucaí.

== Stadium ==
Jacutinga Atlético Clube play their home games at Estádio Luiz Morais Cardoso, nicknamed Luizão. The stadium has a maximum capacity of 2,500 people.
