= Lima (footballer, born 1999) =

Brazilian footballer

Personal information
- Full name: Guilherme Natan de Lima
- Date of birth: 9 May 1999 (age 27)
- Place of birth: Chapecó, Brazil
- Height: 1.73 m (5 ft 8 in)
- Position: Midfielder

Team information
- Current team: ABC

Youth career
- 2014: Avaí
- 2014–2019: Chapecoense
- 2018: → São Paulo (loan)

Senior career*
Years	Team	Apps	(Gls)
2017–2022	Chapecoense	75	(3)
2022	→ Inter de Limeira (loan)	13	(1)
2023–2024	Guarani	5	(0)
2023	→ Náutico (loan)	2	(0)
2024	→ Inter de Limeira (loan)	9	(0)
2024–	ABC	29	(2)
- * Club domestic league appearances and goals as of 18 November 2026

Guilherme Natan de Lima (born 9 May 1999), commonly known as Lima, is a Brazilian professional footballer who plays as a midfielder for ABC.

== Club career ==
Born in Chapecó, Santa Catarina, Lima started his career at Avaí before moving to hometown side Chapecoense in 2014. He made his first team debut on 9 February 2017, coming on as a late substitute for Bryan Mascarenhas in a 0–2 away loss against Cruzeiro in the Primeira Liga.

Lima subsequently returned to the youth setup, and was loaned to São Paulo's under-20 squad on 1 March 2018. He returned to Chape in 2019, and was definitely promoted to the main squad for the 2020 campaign.

On 17 July 2020, Lima renewed his contract until 2023. He scored his first senior goal on 11 March of the following year, netting the opener in a 2–1 home win against Avaí.

== Career statistics ==
As of 25 October 2021

Club	Season	League			State League		Cup		Continental		Other		Total	
Club	Season	Division	Apps	Goals	Apps	Goals	Apps	Goals	Apps	Goals	Apps	Goals	Apps	Goals
Chapecoense	2017	Série A	0	0	0	0	0	0	—		1 (Note: Appearance(s) in Primeira Liga)	0	1	0
Chapecoense	2020	Série B	7	0	4	0	2	0	—		—		13	0
Chapecoense	2021	Série A	19	0	15	2	2	0	—		1 (Note: Appearance(s) in Recopa Catarinense)	0	37	2
Career total			26	0	19	2	4	0	0	0	2	0	51	2
