= Gabriel Poveda =

Brazilian footballer (born 1998)

Personal information
- Full name: Gabriel Buscariol Poveda
- Date of birth: 7 July 1998 (age 28)
- Place of birth: Araçatuba, Brazil
- Height: 1.83 m (6 ft 0 in)
- Position: Forward

Team information
- Current team: Remo (loan)
- Number: 99

Youth career
- 2009: Rio Preto
- 2015–2018: Guarani
- 2017–2018: → Internacional (loan)

Senior career*
Years	Team	Apps	(Gls)
2018	Guarani	12	(1)
2019–2024	Alverca B	1	(0)
2019	→ Athletico Paranaense (loan)	6	(0)
2019	→ Juventude (loan)	3	(1)
2020–2021	→ Brasil de Pelotas (loan)	42	(4)
2022	→ Sampaio Corrêa (loan)	45	(22)
2023	→ Bolívar (loan)	10	(3)
2023–2024	→ Avaí (loan)	44	(12)
2025	Vila Nova	49	(17)
2026–	Primavera	8	(4)
2026–	→ Remo (loan)	2	(0)
- * Club domestic league appearances and goals as of 9 April 2026

Gabriel Buscariol Poveda (born 7 July 1998) is a Brazilian footballer who plays as a forward for Remo, on loan from Primavera.

== Club career ==
Born in Araçatuba, São Paulo, Poveda was a Guarani youth graduate. After a loan to the under-20 side of Internacional, he made his first team debut for Bugre on 15 June 2018, coming on as a late substitute for Erik in a 0–0 Série B home draw against São Bento.

Poveda scored his first professional goal on 3 November 2018, netting the opener in a 2–0 away win over Coritiba. In January 2019, he moved to Portuguese side Alverca, but returned to his home country shortly after, after being loaned to Athletico Paranaense.

After featuring rarely, Poveda was presented at Juventude on 26 July 2019. He moved to Brasil de Pelotas for the 2020 season, but suffered a serious knee injury in November of that year, being sidelined until the following August.

On 7 January 2022, Poveda joined Sampaio Corrêa, still on loan from Alverca.

== Career statistics ==
As of 5 September 2024

Club	Season	League			State League		Cup		Continental		Other		Total	
Club	Season	Division	Apps	Goals	Apps	Goals	Apps	Goals	Apps	Goals	Apps	Goals	Apps	Goals
Guarani	2018	Série B	12	1	—		—		—		—		12	1
Alverca B	2018–19	AF Lisboa 1ª Divisão	1	0	—		—		—		—		12	1
Athletico Paranaense	2019	Série A	0	0	6	0	0	0	0	0	—		6	0
Juventude	2019	Série C	3	1	—		—		—		—		3	1
Brasil de Pelotas	2020	Série B	19	3	10	1	3	1	—		—		32	5
Brasil de Pelotas	2021	Série B	13	0	0	0	—		—		—		13	0
Brasil de Pelotas	Total		32	3	10	1	3	1	—		—		45	5
Sampaio Corrêa	2022	Série B	37	19	8	3	2	0	—		5 (Note: Appearance(s) in Copa do Nordeste)	4	52	26
Bolívar	2023	Bolivian Primera División	10	3	—		2	3	4	0	—		16	6
Avaí	2023	Série B	19	3	—		—		—		—		19	3
Avaí	2024	Série B	10	1	15	8	—		—		—		25	9
Avaí	Total		29	4	15	8	—		—		—		44	12
Career total			114	28	39	12	7	4	4	0	5	4	169	48

== Honours ==
Athletico Paranaense

- Campeonato Paranaense: 2019

Sampaio Corrêa

- Campeonato Maranhense: 2022

Individual

- 2022 Campeonato Brasileiro Série B top scorer: 19 goals
- 2024 Campeonato Catarinense top scorer: 8 goals
