= Diego Ceará =

Brazilian footballer (born 1993)

Personal information
- Full name: Diego Alves Vieira
- Date of birth: 10 June 1993 (age 33)
- Place of birth: Crateús, Brazil
- Height: 1.80 m (5 ft 11 in)
- Position: Forward

Team information
- Current team: Marcílio Dias

Youth career
- 2011–2012: Crateús
- 2012–2013: Mogi Mirim

Senior career*
Years	Team	Apps	(Gls)
2013	Mogi Mirim	0	(0)
2013–2014	Votuporanguense	3	(0)
2014	Olímpia	17	(6)
2015	Icasa	16	(4)
2015–2016	Confiança	27	(4)
2016–2017	Juazeirense	14	(5)
2017	Itabaiana	1	(0)
2018	Sergipe	2	(1)
2018	Nacional-PR	1	(1)
2019	Afogados	12	(6)
2019	Treze	5	(0)
2019	Morrinhos	4	(1)
2020	Afogados	11	(7)
2020–2021	Boa Esporte	16	(2)
2021	Central	8	(3)
2021–2023	Barra-SC	27	(8)
2023	UNIRB	8	(4)
2023	Jacuipense	2	(0)
2023	Afogados	11	(10)
2024–2025	Sousa	57	(22)
2024	→ Vitória-PE (loan)	7	(3)
2025–	Marcílio Dias		
- * Club domestic league appearances and goals as of 3 November 2025

Diego Alves Vieira (born 10 June 1993), better known as Diego Ceará, is a Brazilian professional footballer who plays as a forward.

== Career ==
Diego Ceará drew attention for being one of the top scorers in the 2013 edition of the Copa São Paulo de Futebol Júnior, being promoted to the Mogi Mirim professional team that year. He later played for Votuporanguense and Olímpia in São Paulo football, and for Icasa in 2015 Campeonato Brasileiro Série C.

Ceará played for the main teams in Sergipe, being state champion with CS Sergipe in 2018. He was also champion of the third division of Paraná that year, with Nacional-PR.

He also stood out in subsequent seasons playing for Barra-SC and Afogados, helping these clubs reach their respective state elites. In 2024 he arrived at Sousa where he was two-time state champion and top scorer in 2025. In July 2025, Ceará signed with Marcílio Dias .

== Honours ==
Sergipe

- Campeonato Sergipano: 2018

Nacional de Rolândia

- Campeonato Paranaense Série Bronze: 2018

Barra-SC

- Campeonato Catarinense Série B: 2021

Afogados

- Campeonato Pernambucano Série A2: 2023

Sousa

- Campeonato Paraibano: 2024, 2025

Individual

- 2013 Copa São Paulo de Futebol Jr. top scorer: 8 goals
- 2025 Campeonato Paraibano top scorer: 6 goals
