= Edu (footballer, born 1993) =

Brazilian footballer

Personal information
- Full name: Eduardo Nascimento da Silva
- Date of birth: 5 March 1993 (age 33)
- Place of birth: Rio de Janeiro, Brazil
- Height: 1.84 m (6 ft 0 in)
- Position: Forward

Team information
- Current team: Cuiabá
- Number: 9

Youth career
- 2007–2008: Vasco da Gama
- 2009: Portuguesa
- 2010–2011: Botafogo
- 2012: São Gonçalo EC
- 2013: Flamengo

Senior career*
Years	Team	Apps	(Gls)
2012	São Gonçalo EC	7	(2)
2014–2015	São Gonçalo FC	33	(22)
2014–2015	→ Boavista (loan)	5	(0)
2015–2017	Itaboraí	27	(17)
2017	→ Portuguesa-RJ (loan)	10	(1)
2017–2018	Brusque	3	(1)
2018	Itaboraí	13	(8)
2018–2020	Nova Iguaçu	9	(2)
2019	→ Atlético Tubarão (loan)	15	(6)
2020–2021	Brusque	46	(25)
2022–2023	Cruzeiro	43	(18)
2023	→ Dibba Al Fujairah (loan)	6	(2)
2023–2024	Coritiba	14	(2)
2024	Cerro Porteño	11	(1)
2024	Goiás	23	(4)
2025–	Cuiabá	12	(1)
- * Club domestic league appearances and goals as of 19:51, 16 February 2024 (UTC)

Eduardo Nascimento da Silva Júnior (born 5 March 1993), commonly known as Edu, is a Brazilian footballer who plays as a forward for Cuiabá.

== Club career ==
Born in Rio de Janeiro, Edu made his senior debut with São Gonçalo Esporte Clube in 2012. He then signed for Flamengo in the following year, but only featured for the under-20s before moving to São Gonçalo Futebol Clube.

On 7 October 2014, after being São Gonçalo's top goalscorer in the year's Campeonato Carioca Série C, Edu signed for Boavista. He returned to SGFC after playing rarely in the 2015 Campeonato Carioca, and scored a further seven times for the club before joining Itaboraí on 10 July 2015.

On 21 September 2017, after scoring prolifically for Itaboraí, Edu agreed to a pre-contract deal with Brusque for the Copa Santa Catarina. The following 28 March, after featuring sparingly, he returned to his previous club.

On 18 October 2018, Edu signed for Nova Iguaçu, but moved out on loan to Atlético Tubarão on 22 February of the following year. On 29 December 2019, he returned to Brusque after signing a deal until April 2021.

In August 2020, after becoming an undisputed starter, Edu suffered a knee injury, and was sidelined for the remainder of the campaign, which ended in promotion to the Série B. On 17 April 2021, he renewed his contract until November 2022.

On 15 October 2021, during a match against Remo, Edu missed a penalty, scored one goal and subsequently played as a goalkeeper after Ruan Carneiro was taken off due to an injury; he also saved a penalty late in the match. He finished the league as top scorer with 17 goals, as his side narrowly avoided relegation.

On 9 December 2021, Edu joined fellow second division side Cruzeiro. After being a starter during the season as the club achieved promotion to the Série A, he was loaned to Emirati club Dibba Al Fujairah until June.

On 6 July 2023, Edu returned to his home country after signing a contract with Coritiba in the top tier, until the end of 2024.

== Career statistics ==
As of 6 July 2023

Club	Season	League			State League		Cup		Continental		Other		Total	
Club	Season	Division	Apps	Goals	Apps	Goals	Apps	Goals	Apps	Goals	Apps	Goals	Apps	Goals
São Gonçalo EC	2012	Carioca Série C	—		7	2	—		—		—		7	2
São Gonçalo FC	2014	Carioca Série C	—		17	15	—		—		—		17	15
São Gonçalo FC	2015	Carioca Série B	—		16	7	—		—		—		16	7
São Gonçalo FC	Total		—		33	22	—		—		—		33	22
Boavista (loan)	2014	Série D	0	0	—		—		—		8 (Note: Appearance(s) in Copa Rio)	4	8	4
Boavista (loan)	2015	Carioca	—		5	0	0	0	—		—		5	0
Boavista (loan)	Total		0	0	5	0	0	0	—		8	4	13	4
Itaboraí	2015	Carioca Série C	—		7	7	—		—		—		7	7
Itaboraí	2016	Carioca Série B	—		5	0	—		—		6	2	11	2
Itaboraí	2017	Carioca Série B1	—		15	10	—		—		2	2	17	12
Itaboraí	Total		—		27	17	—		—		8	4	35	21
Portuguesa-RJ (loan)	2017	Carioca	—		10	1	—		—		—		10	1
Brusque	2017	Série D	0	0	—		—		—		8 (Note: Appearance(s) in Copa Santa Catarina)	8	8	8
Brusque	2018	Série D	0	0	3	1	1	0	—		—		4	1
Brusque	Total		0	0	3	1	1	0	—		8	8	12	9
Itaboraí	2018	Carioca Série B1	—		13	8	—		—		7	3	20	11
Nova Iguaçu	2019	Carioca	—		8	2	—		—		—		8	2
Nova Iguaçu	2020	Carioca	—		1	0	—		—		—		1	0
Nova Iguaçu	Total		—		9	2	—		—		—		9	2
Atlético Tubarão (loan)	2019	Série D	6	2	9	4	—		—		3	3	18	9
Brusque	2020	Série C	1	0	12	8	3	2	—		1 (Note: Appearance(s) in Recopa Catarinense)	2	17	12
Brusque	2021	Série B	33	17	0	0	0	0	—		—		33	17
Brusque	Total		34	17	12	8	3	2	—		1	2	50	29
Cruzeiro	2022	Série B	33	11	10	7	5	5	—		—		48	23
Dibba Al Fujairah (loan)	2022–23	UAE Pro League	6	2	—		0	0	—		—		6	2
Coritiba	2023	Série A	0	0	—		—		—		—		0	0
Career total			51	22	137	71	6	5	2	0	35	24	244	133

== Honours ==
Brusque

- Recopa Catarinense: 2020

Cruzeiro

- Campeonato Brasileiro - Série B: 2022
