= ABC Futebol Clube =

Brazilian association football club based in Natal, Rio Grande do Norte, Brazil

ABC
- Full name: ABC Futebol Clube
- Nicknames: O Mais Querido (The Most Beloved); Elefante da Frasqueira (Frasqueira's Elephant); O Clube do Povo (The People's Club); Campeão das Multidões (Crowd Champions)
- Founded: 29 June 1915; 111 years ago
- Ground: Frasqueirão
- Capacity: 18,000
- President: Eduardo Machado
- Head coach: Rodrigo Santana
- League: Campeonato Brasileiro Série D Campeonato Potiguar
- 2025 2025: Série C, 18th of 20 (relegated); Potiguar, 2nd of 8
- Website: abcfc.com.br
Home colors	Away colors

ABC Futebol Clube, commonly referred to as ABC, is a Brazilian professional club based in Natal, Rio Grande do Norte founded on 29 June 1915. It competes in the Campeonato Brasileiro Série D, the fourth tier of Brazilian football, as well as in the Campeonato Potiguar, the top flight of the Rio Grande do Norte state football league.

ABC is the top ranked team from Rio Grande do Norte in CBF's national club ranking, at 44th overall.

== History ==
At precisely 13 hours on 29 June 1915, a group of young men belonging to the elites of the state of Rio Grande do Norte met in Rio Branco Avenue, in the back of the Carlos Gomes Theatre, now known as the Alberto Maranhão Theatre, to decide about the creation of the first football club of the state. The club's foundation ceremony occurred in the house of Avelino Alves Freire, a respected merchant in the state.

The first subject to decide in the meeting was the name of the club. One of the founders, José Pinheiro, gives the idea of calling the new club as ABC Futebol Clube in which it was unanimously approved. The name ABC is given in honour of the pact of fraternal friendship which was diplomatically supported by three countries: Argentina, Brazil, and Chile, called the ABC Pact, whose letters refer to the initials of the three countries.

The team incorporated on 13 December 1927, when the state's football league registered the club charter.

ABC's first interstate match was in 1917, defeating Santa Cruz of Recife, Pernambuco 2–1.

ABC is in the Guinness Book for having won ten consecutive state championships from 1932 to 1941, sharing this record with América Mineiro, that won ten consecutive titles from 1916 to 1925. The team also is the team with the most state championship titles in Brazil, holding 57 titles.

In 1979, Rivellino played for ABC in a 1–1 friendly match against Vasco da Gama. In the same year ABC played against the Brazil Olympic team, losing 1–0.

The club won the Série C in 2010 after beating Ituiutaba in the final.

== Stadium ==
The club owns Estádio Maria Lamas Farache, nicknamed Frasqueirão, which has a maximum capacity of 18,000.

== Players ==
As of 2 October 2026

Note: Flags indicate national team as defined under FIFA eligibility rules; some limited exceptions apply. Players may hold more than one non-FIFA nationality.

No.	Pos.	Nation	Player
—	GK	BRA	Matheus Alves
—	GK	BRA	Rodolfo Castro
—	GK	BRA	Vitor Luiz
—	DF	BRA	Davi
—	DF	BRA	Fabão
—	DF	BRA	Wellington Carvalho
—	DF	BRA	João Victor
—	DF	BRA	Lucas Souza (on loan from Volta Redonda)
—	DF	BRA	Dudu Mandai
—	DF	BRA	Lucas Marques
—	DF	BRA	Thallyson
—	DF	BRA	Darlan

No.	Pos.	Nation	Player
—	DF	BRA	Cayo Tenório
—	MF	BRA	Geilson
—	MF	BRA	Régis Potiguar
—	MF	BRA	Edson
—	MF	BRA	Wellington Reis
—	MF	BRA	Lima
—	MF	BRA	Mateus Bernardo
—	MF	BRA	Ramires (on loan from Pouso Alegre)
—	FW	BRA	Rikelmi
—	FW	BRA	Emanuel
—	FW	BRA	Fábio
—	FW	BRA	Wallyson

== Honours ==
=== Official tournaments ===
National
Competitions	Titles	Seasons
Campeonato Brasileiro Série C	1	2010
State
Competitions	Titles	Seasons
Campeonato Potiguar	57	1920, 1921, 1923, 1925, 1926, 1928, 1929, 1932, 1933, 1934, 1935, 1936, 1937, 1938, 1939, 1940, 1941, 1944, 1945, 1947, 1950, 1953, 1954, 1955, 1958, 1959, 1960, 1961, 1962, 1965, 1966, 1970, 1971, 1972, 1973, 1976, 1978, 1983, 1984, 1990, 1993, 1994, 1995, 1997, 1998, 1999, 2000, 2005, 2007, 2008, 2010, 2011, 2016, 2017, 2018, 2020, 2022
Copa Rio Grande do Norte	1	2005

- record

=== Others tournaments ===
==== Inter-state ====
- Torneio Rio Grande do Norte-Paraíba (1): 1983

==== State ====
- Campeonato Potiguar Second Division (1): 2010 (reserve team)
- Copa Cidade do Natal (5): 2012, 2018, 2019, 2020, 2022
- Copa RN (9): 2008, 2010, 2011, 2015, 2016, 2017, 2018, 2020, 2021
- Torneio Início do Rio Grande do Norte (34): 1927, 1928, 1930, 1931, 1935, 1936, 1937, 1938, 1939, 1940, 1941, 1942, 1944, 1945, 1946, 1950, 1951, 1954, 1957, 1958, 1960, 1962, 1963, 1965, 1967, 1973, 1978, 1980, 1983, 1990, 1992, 1993, 1994, 1998

=== Runners-up ===
- Campeonato Brasileiro Série C (1): 2022
- Copa do Nordeste (1): 2010
- Campeonato Potiguar (32): 1922, 1927, 1930, 1931, 1946, 1948, 1949, 1951, 1956, 1957, 1963, 1964, 1968, 1969, 1974, 1975, 1977, 1979, 1980, 1986, 1988, 1989, 1991, 1992, 1996, 2012, 2015, 2019, 2021, 2023, 2025, 2026
- Copa Rio Grande do Norte (1): 2006

=== Women's Football ===
- Campeonato Potiguar de Futebol Feminino (1): 2007
