= Léo Gamalho =

Brazilian footballer (born 1986)

Personal information
- Full name: Leonardo Gamalho de Souza
- Date of birth: 30 January 1986 (age 40)
- Place of birth: Porto Alegre, Brazil
- Height: 1.88 m (6 ft 2 in)
- Position: Striker

Team information
- Current team: Avaí
- Number: 9

Youth career
- 1997–2002: Grêmio
- 2003: River Plate
- 2004: Internacional

Senior career*
| Years | Team | Apps | (Gls) |
| 2005 | Internacional | 1 | (0) |
| 2006 | Botafogo | | |
| 2007 | América-RN | | |
| 2007–2009 | Valdevez | 53 | (31) |
| 2009 | Shenyang Dongjin | 22 | (7) |
| 2010 | Shanghai Zobon | 18 | (5) |
| 2011 | Grêmio Barueri | 21 | (3) |
| 2012 | ABC | 1 | (0) |
| 2012 | Caxias | 3 | (0) |
| 2013 | ASA | 5 | (1) |
| 2013 | Ceará | 25 | (6) |
| 2014 | Santa Cruz | 34 | (13) |
| 2015 | Bahia | 8 | (1) |
| 2015 | Avaí | 14 | (5) |
| 2016 | Nacional | 11 | (2) |
| 2016–2017 | Goiás | 31 | (11) |
| 2017 | Ponte Preta | 13 | (3) |
| 2018 | Pohang Steelers | 28 | (6) |
| 2019 | Criciúma | 36 | (13) |
| 2020 | CRB | 31 | (18) |
| 2020–2021 | Al-Khor | 11 | (5) |
| 2021–2022 | Coritiba | 92 | (40) |
| 2023–2024 | Vitória | 38 | (13) |
| 2024–2025 | Mirassol | 27 | (6) |
| 2025–2026 | Botafogo-SP | 17 | (4) |
| 2026– | Avaí | 18 | (2) |
- * Club domestic league appearances and goals as of 18 November 2026

Leonardo "Léo" Gamalho de Souza (born 30 January 1986) is a Brazilian footballer who plays as a striker for Avaí.

== Career ==
Léo started his career in 2005 on Internacional's squad and transferred to Botafogo in 2006 and América in 2007.

In March 2009,he moved to China and signed a contract with Shenyang Dongjin. He moved to Shanghai Zobon in 2010.

In 2013 he signed with Ceará.

== Honours ==
=== Individual ===
- Copa do Brasil top scorer: 2014, 2017
