= Rodolfo (footballer, born 1992) =

Brazilian football player born 1992

Personal information
- Full name: Rodolfo José da Silva Bardella
- Date of birth: 21 May 1992 (age 34)
- Place of birth: São Manuel, Brazil
- Height: 1.82 m (6 ft 0 in)
- Position: Forward

Team information
- Current team: Botafogo-PB
- Number: 77

Senior career*
Years	Team	Apps	(Gls)
2012–2013	Jacutinga	?	(7)
2013	Elosport	8	(1)
2014–2020	Capivariano	37	(10)
2014	→ Rio Branco-SP (loan)	0	(0)
2015	→ Bragantino (loan)	26	(2)
2016	→ CRB (loan)	10	(2)
2016	→ Boa Esporte (loan)	6	(2)
2017	→ São Bernardo (loan)	9	(0)
2017–2018	→ Boa Esporte (loan)	30	(10)
2018	→ Dibba Al-Fujairah (loan)	11	(3)
2018	→ Paraná (loan)	9	(1)
2018	→ Fortaleza (loan)	6	(1)
2019	→ Mirassol (loan)	13	(3)
2019	→ Cuiabá (loan)	19	(3)
2020	→ América Mineiro (loan)	31	(7)
2020–2023	América Mineiro	37	(12)
2022	→ Cruzeiro (loan)	18	(1)
2023	→ Novorizontino (loan)	24	(3)
2024	Novorizontino	36	(7)
2025	São Bernardo	33	(5)
2026	Capivariano	5	(2)
2026–	Botafogo-PB	28	(7)
- * Club domestic league appearances and goals as of 8 November 2026

Rodolfo José da Silva Bardella (born 21 May 1992), simply known as Rodolfo is a Brazilian footballer who plays as a forward for Botafogo-PB.

== Club career ==
Born in São Manuel, Rodolfo started his senior professional career with Jacutinga Atlético Clube before moving to Capivariano Futebol Clube in 2014. He was a part of the squad which won promotion to the Paulista A1 in 2014, scoring a goal in the final against Sociedade Esportiva Itapirense. On 30 April 2015, he joined Clube Atlético Bragantino on a loan deal.

After successive loan stints with Rio Branco and CRB, where he was rarely used, Rodolfo joined Série C (third tier) Boa Esporte Clube on 14 September 2016 again on loan. Four days later, he made his debut, scoring a goal in a 4–0 victory over Guaratinguetá. He ended the season winning the league.

On 3 January 2017, Rodolfo was loaned to São Bernardo Futebol Clube for the Paulista championship. He was later reloaned to Boa and scored a hat-trick on 11 November in a 4-3 victory over Santa Cruz Futebol Clube. In January 2018, he joined Emirati club Dibba Al-Fujairah on a loan deal. He made his debut against Al Wahda, scoring a goal in the 3–1 defeat.
