= 2021 Cruzeiro EC season =

Cruzeiro
2021 season
- President: Sérgio Santos Rodrigues
- Manager: Felipe Conceição (until 9 June) Mozart Santos (10 June to 30 July) Vanderlei Luxemburgo (since 3 August)
- Stadium: Mineirão
- Série B: 14th
- Campeonato Mineiro: Semi-finals
- Copa do Brasil: Third stage
- Top goalscorer: League: Marcelo Moreno (5); All: Matheus Barbosa (7)
- Biggest win: 4–0 vs Patrocinense (25 April, Campeonato Mineiro)
- Biggest defeat: 0–3 vs Avaí (17 July, Série B)
| Home colors | Away colors | Third colors |

The 2021 season was the 100th in the Cruzeiro Esporte Clube's existence.

Along with the Campeonato Brasileiro Série B, the club also competed in the Campeonato Mineiro and in the Copa do Brasil.

== Players ==
=== Squad information ===
Last updated on 9 October.

| Squad No. | Name | Nationality | Position(s) | Date of birth (age) | Apps | Goals | Signed from |
Goalkeepers
| 1 | Fábio (captain) | (Brazil) | GK | 30 September 1980 (age 46) | 966 | 0 | (Brazil) Vasco da Gama |
| 12 | Lucas França | (Brazil) | GK | 23 January 1996 (age 30) | 8 | 0 | Youth system |
| 40 | Vinícius | (Brazil) | GK | 4 January 2002 (age 24) | 0 | 0 | Youth system |
Defenders
| 2 | Cáceres | (Paraguay) | RB | 18 September 1991 (age 35) | 60 | 2 | (Paraguay) Cerro Porteño |
| 4 | Ramon | (Brazil) | CB | 3 May 1995 (age 31) | 70 | 5 | (Brazil) Vitória |
| 6 | Matheus Pereira | (Brazil) | LB | 21 December 2000 (age 25) | 58 | 1 | Youth system |
| 14 | Eduardo Brock | (Brazil) | CB | 6 May 1991 (age 35) | 22 | 0 | (Brazil) Ceará |
| 23 | Joseph | (Brazil) | CB | 30 December 1991 (age 34) | 6 | 0 | (Brazil) Capivariano (loan) |
| 25 | Léo Santos | (Brazil) | CB | 3 June 1994 (age 32) | 7 | 1 | (Brazil) Ituano (loan) |
| 32 | Norberto | (Brazil) | RB | 19 July 1990 (age 36) | 12 | 0 | (Brazil) CSA |
| 33 | Paulo | (Brazil) | CB | 14 February 2002 (age 24) | 6 | 0 | Youth system |
| 34 | Weverton | (Brazil) | CB | 17 February 2003 (age 23) | 13 | 0 | Youth system |
| 36 | Jean Victor | (Brazil) | LB | 1 July 1994 (age 32) | 9 | 0 | (Brazil) Boavista |
| 42 | Geovane | (Brazil) | RB | 31 July 2001 (age 25) | 1 | 0 | Youth system |
| 44 | Rhodolfo | (Brazil) | CB | 11 August 1986 (age 40) | 5 | 0 | (Brazil) Coritiba |
| 46 | Kaiki | (Brazil) | CB | 8 March 2003 (age 23) | 3 | 0 | Youth system |
Midfielders
| 5 | Matheus Neris | (Brazil) | DM/CM | 12 February 1999 (age 27) | 12 | 0 | (Brazil) Palmeiras |
| 8 | Henrique | (Brazil) | DM/CM | 16 May 1985 (age 41) | 524 | 27 | (Brazil) Santos |
| 11 | Marcinho | (Brazil) | CM/AM | 28 July 1995 (age 31) | 28 | 2 | (Brazil) Sampaio Corrêa |
| 15 | Adriano | (Brazil) | DM/CM | 4 November 1999 (age 26) | 60 | 0 | Youth system |
| 20 | Marco Antônio | (Brazil) | CM/AM | 15 July 2000 (age 26) | 13 | 0 | Youth system |
| 26 | Ariel Cabral | (Argentina) | DM/CM | 11 September 1987 (age 39) | 195 | 4 | (Argentina) Vélez Sarsfield |
| 27 | Rômulo | (Brazil) | DM/CM | 22 May 1987 (age 39) | 55 | 0 | (Italy) Genoa |
| 28 | Giovanni | (Brazil) | CM/AM | 4 April 1994 (age 32) | 32 | 2 | (Brazil) Coritiba |
| 30 | Flávio | (Brazil) | DM/CM | 15 June 2000 (age 26) | 19 | 0 | (Brazil) América Mineiro (loan) |
| 35 | Lucas Ventura | (Brazil) | DM/CM | 19 May 1998 (age 28) | 18 | 0 | Youth system |
| 49 | Claudinho | (Brazil) | CM/AM | 18 November 2000 (age 25) | 36 | 2 | (Brazil) Ferroviária |
Forwards
| 9 | Marcelo Moreno | (Bolivia) | ST | 18 June 1987 (age 39) | 143 | 54 | (China) Shijiazhuang Ever Bright |
| 10 | Rafael Sóbis | (Brazil) | ST/AM | 17 June 1985 (age 41) | 169 | 34 | (Brazil) Ceará |
| 16 | Bruno José | (Brazil) | RW/LW | 31 March 1998 (age 28) | 39 | 4 | (Brazil) Internacional |
| 17 | Keké | (Brazil) | ST | 11 October 1995 (age 30) | 1 | 0 | (Brazil) Tombense (loan) |
| 18 | Thiago | (Brazil) | ST | 26 June 2001 (age 25) | 47 | 6 | Youth system |
| 21 | Wellington Nem | (Brazil) | ST/LW/RW | 6 February 1992 (age 34) | 16 | 0 | (Brazil) Fortaleza |
| 22 | Felipe Augusto | (Brazil) | ST/LW/RW | 6 March 1992 (age 34) | 36 | 5 | (Brazil) América Mineiro |
| 29 | Vitor Leque | (Brazil) | ST/LW/RW | 19 January 2001 (age 25) | 3 | 1 | Youth system |
| 31 | Dudu | (Brazil) | ST/LW/RW | 20 May 1999 (age 27) | 7 | 0 | (Brazil) Primavera (loan) |
| 59 | Zé Eduardo | (Brazil) | ST | 8 July 1999 (age 27) | 1 | 0 | Youth system |

== Transfers and loans ==
Last updated on 24 June.

=== Transfers in ===
| Entry date | Position | No. | Player | From club | Fee | Ref. |
|---|---|---|---|---|---|---|
| 12 February | MF | 95 | (Brazil) Marcinho | (Brazil) Sampaio Corrêa | Free | |
| 12 February | DF | 28 | (Brazil) Alan Ruschel | (Brazil) Chapecoense | Free | |
| 13 February | FW | 22 | (Brazil) Felipe Augusto | (Brazil) América Mineiro | Free | |
| 13 February | MF | 5 | (Brazil) Matheus Neris | (Brazil) Palmeiras | Free | |
| 17 February | FW | 16 | (Brazil) Bruno José | (Brazil) Internacional | Free | |
| 25 February | DF | 14 | (Brazil) Eduardo Brock | (Brazil) Ceará | Free | |
| 26 March | MF | 27 | (Brazil) Rômulo | (Italy) Genoa | Free | |
| 22 June | FW | 21 | (Brazil) Wellington Nem | (Brazil) Fortaleza | Free | |
| 23 June | DF | 32 | (Brazil) Norberto | (Brazil) CSA | Free | |
| 25 June | DF | 36 | (Brazil) Jean Victor | (Brazil) Boavista | Free | |
| 25 June | DF | 44 | (Brazil) Rhodolfo | (Brazil) Coritiba | Free | |

=== Loans in ===
| Start date | End date | Position | No. | Player | From club | Fee | Ref. |
|---|---|---|---|---|---|---|---|
| 13 January | 21 July | DF | 17 | (Brazil) Matheus Barbosa | (Brazil) Avaí | None | |
| 3 May | 4 August | FW | 29 | (Brazil) Guilherme Bissoli | (Brazil) Athletico Paranaense | None | |
| 19 May | End of the season | DF | 23 | (Brazil) Joseph | (Brazil) Capivariano | None | |
| 20 May | End of the season | MF | 30 | (Brazil) Flávio | (Brazil) América Mineiro | None | |
| 26 May | 16 July | DF | 31 | (Brazil) Klebinho | (Brazil) Flamengo | None | |
| 23 June | End of the season | FW | 17 | (Brazil) Keké | (Brazil) Tombense | None | |
| 25 June | 30 June 2022 | FW | 31 | (Brazil) Dudu | (Brazil) Primavera | None | |
| 29 June | End of the season | DF | 25 | (Brazil) Léo Santos | (Brazil) Ituano | None | |

=== Transfers out ===
| Exit date | Position | No. | Player | To club | Fee | Ref. |
|---|---|---|---|---|---|---|
| 14 February | DF | 14 | (Brazil) Cacá | (Japan) Tokushima Vortis | R$ 10,7M | |
| 17 February | MF | 16 | (Brazil) Jadsom | (Brazil) Red Bull Bragantino | R$ 5,4M | |
| 11 March | DF | 27 | (Colombia) Orejuela | (Brazil) São Paulo | R$ 13,5M | |
| 12 April | DF | 32 | (Brazil) Manoel | (Brazil) Fluminense | Released | |
| 20 May | DF | 3 | (Brazil) Léo | None | Released | |
| 1 July | MF | 88 | (Brazil) Jadson | (Brazil) Juventude | Released | |
| 14 July | GK | 39 | (Brazil) Vitor Eudes | (Portugal) Marítimo | Released | |
| 30 August | FW | 21 | (Brazil) Welinton | (Brazil) Novorizontino | Released | |

=== Loans out ===
| Start date | End date | Position | No. | Player | To club | Fee | Ref. |
|---|---|---|---|---|---|---|---|
| 29 January | End of the season | FW | 99 | (Brazil) Sassá | (Portugal) Marítimo | None | |
| 13 March | 11 June | MF | 94 | (Brazil) Giovanni | (Brazil) Avaí | None | |
| 13 April | 31 April | FW | 21 | (Brazil) Welinton | (Brazil) Inter de Limeira | None | |
| 20 May | End of the season | DF | 28 | (Brazil) Alan Ruschel | (Brazil) América Mineiro | None | |
| 21 May | End of the season | DF | 23 | (Brazil) Arthur | (Brazil) Brasil de Pelotas | None | |
| 21 May | End of the season | FW | 21 | (Brazil) Welinton | (Brazil) Brasil de Pelotas | None | |
| 24 June | 2 August | GK | 12 | (Brazil) Lucas França | (Brazil) Guarani | None | |
| 30 June | End of the season | FW | 11 | (Brazil) William Pottker | (United Arab Emirates) Al-Wasl | None | |
| 31 August | 30 June 2022 | FW | 19 | (Brazil) Stênio | (Italy) Torino | R$ 600k | |

== Competitions ==
=== Overview ===
| Competition | First match | Last match | Starting round | Final position | Record | | | | | | | |
| Competition | First match | Last match | Starting round | Final position | Pld | W | D | L | GF | GA | GD | Win % |
|---|---|---|---|---|---|---|---|---|---|---|---|---|
| Campeonato Mineiro | 27 February | 9 May | Matchday 1 | Semi-finals | 13 | 6 | 2 | 5 | 14 | 9 | +5 | 46.15 |
| Copa do Brasil | 11 March | 9 June | First stage | Third stage | 4 | 2 | 1 | 1 | 3 | 2 | +1 | 50.00 |
| Campeonato Brasileiro Série B | 29 May | 25 November | Matchday 1 | 14th | 38 | 10 | 18 | 10 | 42 | 44 | −2 | 26.32 |
| Total | | | | | 55 | 18 | 21 | 16 | 59 | 55 | +4 | 32.73 |

Source: Competitions

=== Campeonato Mineiro ===
==== First stage ====
| Pos | Team | Pld | W | D | L | GF | GA | GD | Pts | Qualification or relegation |
|---|---|---|---|---|---|---|---|---|---|---|
| 1 | Atlético Mineiro | 11 | 9 | 0 | 2 | 23 | 7 | +16 | 27 | Knockout stage |
| 2 | América Mineiro | 11 | 7 | 1 | 3 | 17 | 9 | +8 | 22 | Knockout stage |
| 3 | Cruzeiro | 11 | 6 | 2 | 3 | 12 | 4 | +8 | 20 | Knockout stage |
| 4 | Tombense | 11 | 5 | 5 | 1 | 16 | 9 | +7 | 20 | Knockout stage |
| 5 | URT | 11 | 5 | 1 | 5 | 8 | 16 | −8 | 16 | Troféu Inconfidência |

Source: FMF
Rules for classification: 1) Points; 2) Wins; 3) Goal difference; 4) Goals scored; 5) Head-to-head results (only if two teams are tied); 6) Fewest red cards received; 7) Fewest yellow cards received; 8) Draw.

| 27 February 1 | Uberlândia | 1–1 | Cruzeiro | Uberlândia |
| 16:30 UTC−3 | Reis 25' | Report | Cáceres 90+1' | Stadium: Parque do Sabiá; Attendance: 0 Referee: Paulo Cesar Zanovelli da Silva |

| 3 March 2 | Cruzeiro | 0–1 | Caldense | Belo Horizonte |
| 21:30 UTC−3 | | Report | Amarildo 9' | Stadium: Mineirão; Attendance: 0 Referee: Ronei Cândido Alves |

| 6 March 3 | URT | 0–2 | Cruzeiro | Sete Lagoas |
| 21:00 UTC−3 | | Report | Manoel 54'; Marcinho 90+3' | Stadium: Arena do Jacaré; Attendance: 0 Referee: Marco Aurélio Fazekas |

| 14 March 4 | Cruzeiro | 1–0 | Athletic Club | Belo Horizonte |
| 16:00 UTC−3 | Marcelo Moreno 60' (pen.) | Report | | Stadium: Mineirão; Attendance: 0 Referee: Ricardo Marques Ribeiro |

| 21 March 5 | América Mineiro | 1–0 | Cruzeiro | Belo Horizonte |
| 16:00 UTC−3 | Joseph 35' | Report | | Stadium: Independência; Attendance: 0 Referee: Emerson de Almeida Ferreira |

| 1 April 6 | Cruzeiro | 0–0 | Tombense | Belo Horizonte |
| 16:00 UTC−3 | | Report | | Stadium: Mineirão; Attendance: 0 Referee: Felipe Fernandes de Lima |

| 4 April 7 | Boa Esporte | 0–1 | Cruzeiro | Varginha |
| 11:00 UTC−3 | | Report | Rafael Sóbis 20' | Stadium: Melão; Attendance: 0 Referee: Igor Júnio Benevenuto |

| 7 April 8 | Coimbra | 0–2 | Cruzeiro | Belo Horizonte |
| 17:30 UTC−3 | | Report | William Pottker 75'; Felipe Augusto 90+4' | Stadium: Independência; Attendance: 0 Referee: Ricardo Marques Ribeiro |

| 11 April 9 | Cruzeiro | 1–0 | Atlético Mineiro | Belo Horizonte |
| 16:00 UTC−3 | Airton 61' | Report | | Stadium: Mineirão; Attendance: 0 Referee: Paulo Cesar Zavonelli |

| 18 April 10 | Pouso Alegre | 1–0 | Cruzeiro | Pouso Alegre |
| 11:00 UTC−3 | Paulo Henrique 45' | Report | | Stadium: Manduzão; Attendance: 0 Referee: Marco Aurélio Fazekas Ferreira |

| 25 April 11 | Cruzeiro | 4–0 | Patrocinense | Belo Horizonte |
| 16:00 UTC−3 | William Pottker 2', 51'; Matheus Barbosa 48'; Jadson 90' | Report | | Stadium: Mineirão; Attendance: 0 Referee: Igor Júnio Benevenuto |

==== Knockout stage ====
===== Semi-finals =====
| 2 May First leg | Cruzeiro | 1–2 | América Mineiro | Belo Horizonte |
| 16:00 UTC−3 | Rafael Sóbis 36' | Report | Alê 85'; Ademir 90' | Stadium: Mineirão; Attendance: 0 Referee: Marco Aurélio Fazekas Ferreira |

| 9 May Second leg | América Mineiro | 3–1 (5–2 agg.) | Cruzeiro | Belo Horizonte |
| 16:00 UTC−3 | Rodolfo 45+2' (pen.), 71' (pen.); Ramon 90+5' | Report | Matheus Barbosa 62' | Stadium: Independência; Attendance: 0 Referee: Felipe Fernandes de Lima |

=== Campeonato Brasileiro Série B ===
==== League table ====
| Pos | Team | Pld | W | D | L | GF | GA | GD | Pts |
|---|---|---|---|---|---|---|---|---|---|
| 12 | Operário Ferroviário | 38 | 13 | 9 | 16 | 35 | 46 | −11 | 48 |
| 13 | Brusque | 38 | 13 | 9 | 16 | 44 | 56 | −12 | 48 |
| 14 | Cruzeiro | 38 | 10 | 18 | 10 | 42 | 44 | −2 | 48 |
| 15 | Sampaio Corrêa | 38 | 12 | 11 | 15 | 41 | 42 | −1 | 47 |
| 16 | Londrina | 38 | 11 | 11 | 16 | 31 | 41 | −10 | 44 |

Source: CBF
Rules for classification: 1) points; 2) wins; 3) goal difference; 4) goals scored; 5) head-to-head results (only between 2 teams); 6) fewest red cards; 7) fewest yellow cards; 8) drawing of lots.

==== Results by round ====
| Round | 1 | 2 | 3 | 4 | 5 | 6 | 7 | 8 | 9 | 10 | 11 | 12 | 13 | 14 | 15 | 16 | 17 | 18 | 19 | 20 | 21 | 22 | 23 | 24 | 25 | 26 | 27 | 28 | 29 | 30 | 31 | 32 | 33 | 34 | 35 | 36 | 37 | 38 |
|---|---|---|---|---|---|---|---|---|---|---|---|---|---|---|---|---|---|---|---|---|---|---|---|---|---|---|---|---|---|---|---|---|---|---|---|---|---|---|
| Ground | A | H | H | A | A | H | A | H | A | H | A | H | A | A | H | A | H | H | A | H | A | A | H | H | A | H | A | H | A | H | A | H | H | A | H | A | A | H |
| Result | L | L | D | W | L | W | L | D | D | D | D | L | L | D | D | W | D | D | W | W | D | D | W | D | D | L | D | W | W | D | L | L | D | W | W | L | D | D |
| Position | 18 | 20 | 19 | 14 | 18 | 11 | 13 | 14 | 13 | 14 | 14 | 16 | 17 | 19 | 18 | 15 | 15 | 16 | 14 | 14 | 14 | 15 | 13 | 13 | 13 | 14 | 15 | 12 | 12 | 11 | 12 | 14 | 14 | 12 | 11 | 11 | 13 | 14 |

Source: Matches
A = Away; H = Home; W = Win; D = Draw; L = Loss

==== Matches ====
| 29 May 1 | Confiança | 3–1 | Cruzeiro | Aracaju |
| 16:30 UTC−3 | Neto Berola 32' (pen.); Cristiano 71'; Daniel Penha 80' | Report | Guilherme Bissoli 55' | Stadium: Batistão; Attendance: 0 Referee: André Rodrigo Rocha |

| 6 June 2 | Cruzeiro | 3–4 | CRB | Belo Horizonte |
| 18:15 UTC−3 | Airton 9'; Ramon 59'; Matheus Barbosa 85' | Report | Marthã 5'; Diego Torres 32'; Hyuri 52'; Jean Patrick 88' | Stadium: Mineirão; Attendance: 0 Referee: Douglas Marques das Flores |

| 12 June 3 | Cruzeiro | 1–1 | Goiás | Belo Horizonte |
| 21:00 UTC−3 | Marcinho 88' | Report | Joseph 11' (o.g.) | Stadium: Mineirão; Attendance: 0 Referee: Vinicius Furlan |

| 16 June 4 | Ponte Preta | 0–1 | Cruzeiro | Campinas |
| 21:30 UTC−3 | | Report | Bruno José 56' | Stadium: Moisés Lucarelli; Attendance: 0 Referee: Vinicius Gomes do Amaral |

| 19 June 5 | Operário-PR | 2–1 | Cruzeiro | Ponta Grossa |
| 19:00 UTC−3 | Paulo Sérgio 31'; Djalma Silva 82' | Report | Felipe Augusto 43' | Stadium: Germano Krüger; Attendance: 0 Referee: Paulo Henrique Vollkopf |

| 24 June 6 | Cruzeiro | 2–1 | Vasco da Gama | Belo Horizonte |
| 21:30 UTC−3 | Matheus Barbosa 15', 28' | Report | Morato 9' | Stadium: Mineirão; Attendance: 0 Referee: Vinicius Gonçalves Araújo |

| 27 June 7 | CSA | 2–1 | Cruzeiro | Maceió |
| 20:30 UTC−3 | Iury 27', 29' | Report | Felipe Augusto 6' | Stadium: Rei Pelé; Attendance: 0 Referee: Rodrigo Batista Raposo |

| 30 June 8 | Cruzeiro | 3–3 | Guarani | Belo Horizonte |
| 19:00 UTC−3 | Thales 19' (o.g.); Léo Santos 22'; Matheus Barbosa 45' | Report | Bruno Sávio 5', 30'; Régis 68' | Stadium: Mineirão; Attendance: 0 Referee: Rafael Martins de Sá |

| 3 July 9 | Brasil de Pelotas | 0–0 | Cruzeiro | Pelotas |
| 19:00 UTC−3 | | Report | | Stadium: Estádio Bento Freitas; Attendance: 0 Referee: Rafael Salgueiro Lima |

| 6 July 10 | Cruzeiro | 0–0 | Coritiba | Belo Horizonte |
| 19:00 UTC−3 | | Report | | Stadium: Mineirão; Attendance: 0 Referee: Dyorgines Padovani de Andrade |

| 10 July 11 | Botafogo | 3–3 | Cruzeiro | Rio de Janeiro |
| 16:30 UTC−3 | Chay 9' (pen.), 61', 90+3' (pen.) | Report | Gilvan 54' (o.g.); Marcelo Moreno 66', 69' | Stadium: Nilton Santos; Attendance: 0 Referee: Rodolpho Toski Marques |

| 17 July 12 | Cruzeiro | 0–3 | Avaí | Belo Horizonte |
| 16:30 UTC−3 | | Report | Marcos Serrato 18'; Renato 69', 81' | Stadium: Mineirão; Attendance: 0 Referee: Alisson Sidnei Furtado |

| 20 July 13 | Remo | 1–0 | Cruzeiro | Belém |
| 19:00 UTC−3 | Victor Andrade 22' | Report | | Stadium: Baenão; Attendance: 0 Referee: Daniel Nobre Bins |

| 24 July 14 | Vila Nova | 0–0 | Cruzeiro | Goiânia |
| 16:30 UTC−3 | | Report | | Stadium: Onésio Brasileiro Alvarenga; Attendance: 0 Referee: Alexandre Vargas de Jesus |

| 30 July 15 | Cruzeiro | 2–2 | Londrina | Belo Horizonte |
| 21:30 UTC−3 | Bruno José 14'; Marcelo Moreno 75' | Report | Matheus Bianqui 24'; Douglas Silva 44' | Stadium: Mineirão; Attendance: 0 Referee: André Luiz Castro |

| 7 August 16 | Brusque | 1–2 | Cruzeiro | Brusque |
| 11:00 UTC−3 | Edu 60' (pen.) | Report | Felipe Augusto 85'; Giovanni 88' | Stadium: Augusto Bauer; Attendance: 0 Referee: Jefferson Ferreira de Moraes |

| 11 August 17 | Cruzeiro | 2–2 | Vitória | Belo Horizonte |
| 19:00 UTC−3 | Rafael Sóbis 49'; Giovanni 68' | Report | Samuel 23' (pen.), 80' | Stadium: Independência; Attendance: 0 Referee: Savio Pereira Sampaio |

| 14 August 18 | Cruzeiro | 1–1 | Sampaio Corrêa | Belo Horizonte |
| 16:30 UTC−3 | Marcelo Moreno 69' | Report | Watson 39' | Stadium: Independência; Attendance: 0 Referee: Caio Max Vieira |

| 17 August 19 | Náutico | 0–1 | Cruzeiro | Recife |
| 19:00 UTC−3 | | Report | Thiago 82' | Stadium: Aflitos; Attendance: 0 Referee: Marcelo de Lima Henrique |

| 20 August 20 | Cruzeiro | 1–0 | Confiança | Belo Horizonte |
| 21:30 UTC−3 | Marcelo Moreno 66' (pen.) | Report | | Stadium: Mineirão; Attendance: 4,730; Referee: Ramon Abatti Abel |

| 29 August 21 | CRB | 0–0 | Cruzeiro | Maceió |
| 16:00 UTC−3 | | Report | | Stadium: Rei Pelé; Attendance: 0 Referee: Bruno Arleu de Araújo |

| 7 September 22 | Goiás | 1–1 | Cruzeiro | Goiânia |
| 21:30 UTC−3 | Élvis 64' | Report | Thiago 63' | Stadium: Serrinha; Attendance: 0 Referee: Jean Pierre Gonçalves Lima |

| 11 September 23 | Cruzeiro | 1–0 | Ponte Preta | Sete Lagoas |
| 11:00 UTC−3 | Bruno José 62' | Report | | Stadium: Arena do Jacaré; Attendance: 4,467; Referee: Wagner do Nascimento Magalhães |

| 16 September 24 | Cruzeiro | 1–1 | Operário-PR | Sete Lagoas |
| 19:00 UTC−3 | Claudinho 16' | Report | Paulo Sérgio 38' (pen.) | Stadium: Arena do Jacaré; Attendance: 5,373; Referee: Rodrigo Dalonso Ferreira |

| 19 September 25 | Vasco da Gama | 1–1 | Cruzeiro | Rio de Janeiro |
| 16:00 UTC−3 | Nenê 44' | Report | Ramon 90+4' | Stadium: São Januário; Attendance: 309; Referee: André Luiz Castro |

| 26 September 26 | Cruzeiro | 1–2 | CSA | Belo Horizonte |
| 16:00 UTC−3 | Claudinho 40' | Report | Yuri 49'; Iury 63' | Stadium: Independência; Attendance: 5,979; Referee: Flávio Rodrigues de Souza |

| 29 September 27 | Guarani | 1–1 | Cruzeiro | Campinas |
| 19:00 UTC−3 | Mateus Ludke 49' | Report | Ramon 12' | Stadium: Brinco de Ouro; Attendance: 0 Referee: Rodolpho Toski Marques |

| 3 October 28 | Cruzeiro | 2–0 | Brasil de Pelotas | Belo Horizonte |
| 11:00 UTC−3 | Vitor Leque 40'; Thiago 45' | Report | | Stadium: Independência; Attendance: 1,953; Referee: Bruno Arleu de Araújo |

| 8 October 29 | Coritiba | 0–3 | Cruzeiro | Curitiba |
| 21:30 UTC−3 | | Report | Giovanni 3'; Adriano 7'; Eduardo Brock 60' | Stadium: Estádio Couto Pereira; Referee: Marielson Alves Silva |

| 12 October 30 | Cruzeiro | 0–0 | Botafogo | Belo Horizonte |
| 21:30 UTC−3 | | Report | | Stadium: Independência; Referee: Denis da Silva Ribeiro Serafim |

| 22 October 31 | Avaí | 1–0 | Cruzeiro | Florianópolis |
| 21:30 UTC−3 | Lourenço 57' | Report | | Stadium: Ressacada; Referee: Flávio Rodrigues de Souza |

| 28 October 32 | Cruzeiro | 1–3 | Remo | Belo Horizonte |
| 21:30 UTC−3 | Eduardo Brock 45+1' | Report | Anderson Uchôa 40'; Jefferson 88'; Ronald 90+3' | Stadium: Independência; Referee: Douglas Schwengber da Silva |

| 1 November 33 | Cruzeiro | 1–1 | Vila Nova | Belo Horizonte |
| 19:00 UTC−3 | Giovanni 38' (pen.) | Report | Clayton 31' (pen.) | Stadium: Independência; Referee: Dewson Fernando Freitas da Silva |

| 5 November 34 | Londrina | 0–1 | Cruzeiro | Londrina |
| 21:30 UTC−3 | | Report | Thiago 83' | Stadium: Estádio do Café; Referee: Alexandre Vargas Tavares de Jesus |

| 9 November 35 | Cruzeiro | 2–0 | Brusque | Belo Horizonte |
| 21:30 UTC−3 | Vitor Leque 27'; Giovanni 50' | Report | | Stadium: Mineirão; Referee: Marcelo de Lima Henrique |

| 14 November 36 | Vitória | 3–0 | Cruzeiro | Salvador |
| 19:00 UTC−3 | Thiago 4' (o.g.); David 8', 35' | Report | | Stadium: Barradão; Referee: Jefferson Ferreira de Moraes |

| 18 November 37 | Sampaio Corrêa | 1–1 | Cruzeiro | São Luís |
| 21:00 UTC−3 | Maurício 8' | Report | Léo Santos 41' | Stadium: Castelão; Referee: Salim Fende Chavez |

| 25 November 38 | Cruzeiro | 0–0 | Náutico | Belo Horizonte |
| 20:00 UTC−3 | | Report | | Stadium: Mineirão; Referee: Paulo Roberto Alves Júnior |

=== Copa do Brasil ===
The drawn for the first stage was held on 2 March.

==== First stage ====
| 11 March Single match | São Raimundo-RR | 1–1 | Cruzeiro | Boa Vista |
| 19:15 UTC−3 | Fininho 8' | Report | Felipe Augusto 53' | Stadium: Canarinho; Attendance: 0 Referee: Thiago Luis Scarascati |
Note: Cruzeiro advanced to the second stage for being the best CBF ranked team.

==== Second stage ====
| 14 April Single match | América-RN | 0–1 | Cruzeiro | Natal |
| 21:30 UTC−3 | | Report | Matheus Barbosa 82' | Stadium: Arena das Dunas; Attendance: 0 Referee: Jefferson Ferreira de Moraes |

==== Third stage ====
| 3 June First leg | Cruzeiro | 1–0 | Juazeirense | Belo Horizonte |
| 16:30 UTC−3 | Bruno José 63' | Report | | Stadium: Mineirão; Attendance: 0 Referee: Alisson Sidnei Furtado |

| 10 June Second leg | Juazeirense | 1–0 (1–1 agg.) (3–2 p) | Cruzeiro | Juazeiro |
| 19:00 UTC−3 | Thauan 85' | Report | | Stadium: Adauto Moraes; Attendance: 0 Referee: Rodrigo Carvalhaes de Miranda |
| | Penalties |
| | Kanu (penalty scored); Wendell (penalty scored); Ian Augusto (penalty scored); Guilherme Lucena (penalty missed) | | (penalty missed) Rômulo; (penalty missed) Felipe Augusto; (penalty scored) Raúl Cáceres; (penalty scored) Adriano; (penalty missed) Matheus Barbosa |

== Squad statistics ==
=== Appearances ===
Players with no appearances not included in the list.

As of match played 3 October.

| No. | Pos. | Nat. | Name | Série B | | Campeonato Mineiro | | Copa do Brasil | | Total | |
| No. | Pos. | Nat. | Name | Apps | Starts | Apps | Starts | Apps | Starts | Apps | Starts |
|---|---|---|---|---|---|---|---|---|---|---|---|
| 1 | GK | (Brazil) | Fábio | 27 | 27 | 13 | 13 | 4 | 4 | 44 | 44 |
| 2 | DF | (Paraguay) | Cáceres | 11 | 10 | 13 | 13 | 4 | 4 | 28 | 27 |
| 4 | DF | (Brazil) | Ramon | 25 | 25 | 12 | 12 | 4 | 4 | 41 | 41 |
| 5 | MF | (Brazil) | Matheus Neris | 2 | 0 | 7 | 3 | 3 | 2 | 12 | 5 |
| 6 | DF | (Brazil) | Matheus Pereira | 17 | 14 | 12 | 9 | 4 | 3 | 33 | 26 |
| 9 | FW | (Bolivia) | Marcelo Moreno | 13 | 9 | 4 | 2 | 1 | 0 | 18 | 11 |
| 10 | FW | (Brazil) | Rafael Sóbis | 22 | 17 | 12 | 10 | 3 | 3 | 37 | 30 |
| 11 | MF | (Brazil) | Marcinho | 16 | 11 | 10 | 7 | 2 | 1 | 28 | 19 |
| 12 | GK | (Brazil) | Lucas França (footballer) | 2 | 1 | 0 | 0 | 0 | 0 | 2 | 1 |
| 14 | DF | (Brazil) | Eduardo Brock | 17 | 17 | 4 | 2 | 1 | 1 | 22 | 20 |
| 15 | MF | (Brazil) | Adriano | 20 | 12 | 12 | 10 | 3 | 2 | 35 | 24 |
| 16 | FW | (Brazil) | Bruno José | 24 | 21 | 11 | 8 | 4 | 4 | 39 | 33 |
| 17 | FW | (Brazil) | Keké | 1 | 0 | 0 | 0 | 0 | 0 | 1 | 0 |
| 18 | FW | (Brazil) | Thiago | 16 | 6 | 4 | 0 | 0 | 0 | 20 | 6 |
| 20 | MF | (Brazil) | Marco Antônio | 5 | 1 | 1 | 0 | 0 | 0 | 6 | 1 |
| 21 | MF | (Brazil) | Wellington Nem | 16 | 8 | 0 | 0 | 0 | 0 | 16 | 8 |
| 22 | FW | (Brazil) | Felipe Augusto | 21 | 13 | 11 | 6 | 4 | 0 | 36 | 19 |
| 23 | DF | (Brazil) | Joseph | 6 | 5 | 0 | 0 | 0 | 0 | 6 | 5 |
| 25 | DF | (Brazil) | Léo Santos | 7 | 7 | 0 | 0 | 0 | 0 | 7 | 7 |
| 26 | MF | (Argentina) | Ariel Cabral | 7 | 3 | 0 | 0 | 0 | 0 | 7 | 3 |
| 27 | MF | (Brazil) | Rômulo | 26 | 24 | 7 | 4 | 3 | 2 | 36 | 30 |
| 28 | MF | (Brazil) | Giovanni | 22 | 13 | 0 | 0 | 0 | 0 | 22 | 13 |
| 29 | FW | (Brazil) | Vitor Leque | 3 | 2 | 0 | 0 | 0 | 0 | 3 | 2 |
| 30 | MF | (Brazil) | Flávio | 19 | 8 | 0 | 0 | 0 | 0 | 19 | 8 |
| 31 | FW | (Brazil) | Dudu | 7 | 3 | 0 | 0 | 0 | 0 | 7 | 3 |
| 32 | DF | (Brazil) | Norberto | 12 | 10 | 0 | 0 | 0 | 0 | 12 | 10 |
| 33 | DF | (Brazil) | Paulo | 3 | 3 | 0 | 0 | 1 | 0 | 4 | 3 |
| 34 | DF | (Brazil) | Weverton | 3 | 2 | 7 | 7 | 3 | 3 | 13 | 12 |
| 35 | MF | (Brazil) | Lucas Ventura | 8 | 8 | 0 | 0 | 0 | 0 | 8 | 8 |
| 36 | DF | (Brazil) | Jean Victor | 9 | 7 | 0 | 0 | 0 | 0 | 9 | 7 |
| 42 | DF | (Brazil) | Geovane | 0 | 0 | 1 | 0 | 0 | 0 | 1 | 0 |
| 44 | DF | (Brazil) | Rhodolfo | 5 | 3 | 0 | 0 | 0 | 0 | 5 | 3 |
| 46 | DF | (Brazil) | Kaiki | 0 | 0 | 1 | 0 | 2 | 0 | 3 | 0 |
| 49 | MF | (Brazil) | Claudinho | 13 | 6 | 7 | 1 | 1 | 1 | 21 | 8 |
Players who are on loan/returned to the youth team/left Cruzeiro that have appeared this season
| – | DF | (Brazil) | Alan Ruschel | 0 | 0 | 5 | 5 | 1 | 1 | 6 | 6 |
| – | DF | (Brazil) | Manoel | 0 | 0 | 5 | 5 | 0 | 0 | 5 | 5 |
| – | DF | (Brazil) | Klebinho | 0 | 0 | 0 | 0 | 1 | 0 | 1 | 0 |
| – | MF | (Brazil) | Jadson | 1 | 0 | 8 | 1 | 2 | 0 | 11 | 1 |
| – | MF | (Brazil) | Matheus Barbosa | 10 | 7 | 13 | 12 | 4 | 3 | 27 | 22 |
| – | FW | (Brazil) | Airton | 9 | 5 | 13 | 9 | 4 | 4 | 26 | 18 |
| – | FW | (Brazil) | Guilherme Bissoli | 8 | 3 | 1 | 0 | 2 | 2 | 11 | 5 |
| – | FW | (Brazil) | Stênio | 4 | 0 | 4 | 0 | 2 | 0 | 10 | 0 |
| – | FW | (Brazil) | William Pottker | 0 | 0 | 10 | 4 | 1 | 0 | 11 | 4 |

=== Goalscorers ===
Includes all competitive matches.

As of match played 3 October.

| Rank | Pos. | No. | Player | Série B | Campeonato Mineiro | Copa do Brasil | Total |
|---|---|---|---|---|---|---|---|
| 1 | MF | – | (Brazil) Matheus Barbosa | 4 | 2 | 1 | 7 |
| 2 | FW | 9 | (Bolivia) Marcelo Moreno | 5 | 1 | 0 | 6 |
| 3 | FW | 22 | (Brazil) Felipe Augusto | 3 | 1 | 1 | 5 |
| 4 | FW | 16 | (Brazil) Bruno José | 3 | 0 | 1 | 4 |
| 5 | DF | 4 | (Brazil) Ramon | 3 | 0 | 0 | 3 |
| 5 | FW | 10 | (Brazil) Rafael Sóbis | 1 | 2 | 0 | 3 |
| 5 | FW | 18 | (Brazil) Thiago | 3 | 0 | 0 | 3 |
| 5 | FW | – | (Brazil) William Pottker | 0 | 3 | 0 | 3 |
| 6 | MF | 11 | (Brazil) Marcinho | 1 | 1 | 0 | 2 |
| 6 | MF | 25 | (Brazil) Giovanni | 2 | 0 | 0 | 2 |
| 6 | MF | 49 | (Brazil) Claudinho | 2 | 0 | 0 | 2 |
| 6 | FW | – | (Brazil) Airton | 1 | 1 | 0 | 2 |
| 7 | DF | 2 | (Paraguay) Cáceres | 0 | 1 | 0 | 1 |
| 7 | DF | 25 | (Brazil) Léo Santos | 1 | 0 | 0 | 1 |
| 7 | FW | 29 | (Brazil) Vitor Leque | 1 | 0 | 0 | 1 |
| 7 | DF | – | (Brazil) Manoel | 0 | 1 | 0 | 1 |
| 7 | MF | – | (Brazil) Jadson | 0 | 1 | 0 | 1 |
| 7 | FW | – | (Brazil) Guilherme Bissoli | 1 | 0 | 0 | 1 |
| Own Goals | | | | 2 | 0 | 0 | 2 |
| Total | | | | 33 | 14 | 3 | 50 |

=== Assists ===
Includes all competitive matches. Not all goals have an assist.

As of match played 3 October.

| Rank | Pos. | No. | Player | Série B | Campeonato Mineiro | Copa do Brasil | Total |
|---|---|---|---|---|---|---|---|
| 1 | FW | 10 | (Brazil) Rafael Sóbis | 3 | 2 | 0 | 5 |
| 1 | MF | 27 | (Brazil) Rômulo | 4 | 1 | 0 | 5 |
| 2 | FW | 16 | (Brazil) Bruno José | 3 | 1 | 0 | 4 |
| 3 | DF | 2 | (Paraguay) Cáceres | 2 | 0 | 1 | 3 |
| 3 | MF | 11 | (Brazil) Marcinho | 3 | 0 | 0 | 3 |
| 3 | MF | 49 | (Brazil) Claudinho | 2 | 1 | 0 | 3 |
| 4 | DF | 6 | (Brazil) Matheus Pereira | 1 | 1 | 0 | 2 |
| 4 | MF | 21 | (Brazil) Wellington Nem | 2 | 0 | 0 | 2 |
| 4 | FW | 22 | (Brazil) Felipe Augusto | 1 | 0 | 1 | 2 |
| 4 | FW | – | (Brazil) William Pottker | 0 | 2 | 0 | 2 |
| 5 | MF | 15 | (Brazil) Adriano | 0 | 1 | 0 | 1 |
| 5 | FW | 18 | (Brazil) Thiago | 1 | 0 | 0 | 1 |
| 5 | DF | 34 | (Brazil) Weverton | 0 | 1 | 0 | 1 |
| 5 | FW | – | (Brazil) Guilherme Bissoli | 0 | 0 | 1 | 1 |

=== Clean sheets ===
Includes all competitive matches.

As of match played 3 October.

| Rank | Pos. | No. | Player | Série B | Campeonato Mineiro | Copa do Brasil | Total |
|---|---|---|---|---|---|---|---|
| 1 | GK | 1 | (Brazil) Fábio | 8 | 7 | 2 | 17 |

=== Disciplinary record ===
Includes all competitive matches.

As of match played 3 October.

| No. | Pos. | Name | Série B | | Campeonato Mineiro | | Copa do Brasil | | Total | |
| No. | Pos. | Name | Booked | Sent off (straight red) | Booked | Sent off (straight red) | Booked | Sent off (straight red) | Booked | Sent off (straight red) |
|---|---|---|---|---|---|---|---|---|---|---|
| 1 | GK | (Brazil) Fábio | 2 | 1 | 0 | 0 | 0 | 0 | 2 | 1 |
| 2 | DF | (Paraguay) Cáceres | 1 | 0 | 2 | 0 | 0 | 0 | 3 | 0 |
| 4 | DF | (Brazil) Ramon | 5 | 0 | 3 | 0 | 2 | 0 | 10 | 0 |
| 5 | MF | (Brazil) Matheus Neris | 0 | 0 | 0 | 0 | 1 | 0 | 1 | 0 |
| 6 | DF | (Brazil) Matheus Pereira | 3 | 0 | 3 | 1 | 2 | 1 | 7 | 2 |
| 9 | FW | (Bolivia) Marcelo Moreno | 3 | 0 | 2 | 0 | 0 | 0 | 5 | 0 |
| 10 | FW | (Brazil) Rafael Sóbis | 4 | 1 | 3 | 0 | 1 | 0 | 8 | 1 |
| 11 | MF | (Brazil) Marcinho | 2 | 0 | 0 | 0 | 0 | 0 | 2 | 0 |
| 12 | GK | (Brazil) Lucas França | 1 | 0 | 1 | 0 | 0 | 0 | 2 | 0 |
| 14 | DF | (Brazil) Eduardo Brock | 3 | 0 | 1 | 0 | 1 | 0 | 4 | 1 |
| 15 | MF | (Brazil) Adriano | 4 | 2 | 2 | 0 | 1 | 0 | 7 | 2 |
| 16 | FW | (Brazil) Bruno José | 3 | 0 | 0 | 0 | 0 | 0 | 3 | 0 |
| 18 | FW | (Brazil) Thiago | 2 | 0 | 1 | 0 | 0 | 0 | 3 | 0 |
| 20 | MF | (Brazil) Marco Antônio | 0 | 0 | 1 | 0 | 0 | 0 | 1 | 0 |
| 21 | MF | (Brazil) Wellington Nem | 1 | 0 | 0 | 0 | 0 | 0 | 1 | 0 |
| 22 | FW | (Brazil) Felipe Augusto | 3 | 0 | 0 | 1 | 0 | 0 | 3 | 1 |
| 25 | DF | (Brazil) Léo Santos | 2 | 0 | 0 | 0 | 0 | 0 | 2 | 0 |
| 26 | MF | (Brazil) Ariel Cabral | 2 | 0 | 0 | 0 | 0 | 0 | 2 | 0 |
| 27 | MF | (Brazil) Rômulo | 4 | 0 | 0 | 0 | 1 | 0 | 5 | 0 |
| 28 | MF | (Brazil) Giovanni | 5 | 0 | 0 | 0 | 0 | 0 | 5 | 0 |
| 30 | MF | (Brazil) Flávio | 2 | 0 | 0 | 0 | 0 | 0 | 2 | 0 |
| 32 | DF | (Brazil) Norberto | 3 | 0 | 0 | 0 | 0 | 0 | 3 | 0 |
| 33 | DF | (Brazil) Paulo | 0 | 1 | 0 | 0 | 0 | 0 | 0 | 1 |
| 34 | DF | (Brazil) Weverton | 0 | 1 | 1 | 0 | 1 | 0 | 2 | 1 |
| 36 | DF | (Brazil) Jean Victor | 3 | 0 | 0 | 0 | 0 | 0 | 3 | 0 |
| 49 | MF | (Brazil) Claudinho | 1 | 0 | 1 | 0 | 0 | 0 | 2 | 0 |
| – | DF | (Brazil) Alan Ruschel | 0 | 0 | 4 | 1 | 0 | 0 | 4 | 1 |
| – | DF | (Brazil) Manoel | 0 | 0 | 3 | 0 | 0 | 0 | 3 | 0 |
| – | MF | (Brazil) Jadson | 1 | 1 | 4 | 0 | 0 | 0 | 5 | 1 |
| – | MF | (Brazil) Matheus Barbosa | 3 | 1 | 0 | 0 | 1 | 0 | 4 | 1 |
| – | FW | (Brazil) Airton | 2 | 0 | 2 | 0 | 1 | 0 | 5 | 0 |
| – | FW | (Brazil) Stênio | 1 | 0 | 0 | 0 | 2 | 0 | 3 | 0 |
| – | FW | (Brazil) William Pottker | 0 | 0 | 2 | 1 | 0 | 0 | 2 | 1 |
