= 2023 Cruzeiro EC season =

Cruzeiro
2023 season
- Owner: Ronaldo
- President: Sérgio Santos Rodrigues
- Manager: Paulo Pezzolano (until 19 March) Pepa (20 March to 29 August); Zé Ricardo (5 September to 12 November) Paulo Autuori (from 14 November)
- Stadium: Mineirão
- Série A: 14th
- Campeonato Mineiro: Semi-finals
- Copa do Brasil: Round of 16
Home colors	Away colors	Third colors

The 2023 season is the 103rd in the Cruzeiro Esporte Clube's existence.

Along with the Campeonato Brasileiro Série A, the club will also compete in the Campeonato Mineiro and in the Copa do Brasil.

== Players ==
=== Current squad ===
As of 14 September 2023

Note: Flags indicate national team as defined under FIFA eligibility rules; some limited exceptions apply. Players may hold more than one non-FIFA nationality.

No.	Pos.	Nation	Player
1	GK	BRA	Rafael Cabral
2	DF	BRA	Wesley Gasolina
3	DF	BRA	Marlon
4	DF	BRA	Luciano Castán
6	DF	BRA	Lucas Oliveira
7	MF	BRA	Mateus Vital
9	FW	BRA	Bruno Rodrigues (on loan from Tombense)
10	MF	BRA	Nikão (on loan from São Paulo)
11	FW	BRA	Wesley Ribeiro
12	DF	BRA	William
14	DF	BRA	Kaiki
15	MF	BRA	Fernando Henrique
16	MF	BRA	Lucas Silva
17	MF	BRA	Ramiro
18	MF	BRA	Matheus Jussa (on loan from Fortaleza)

No.	Pos.	Nation	Player
19	FW	BRA	Arthur Gomes
20	MF	BRA	Ian Luccas
22	FW	BRA	Stênio
23	MF	BRA	Filipe Machado
24	DF	COL	Helibelton Palacios
27	DF	BRA	Neris
30	FW	BRA	Paulo Vitor
31	FW	BRA	Rafael Bilú
40	FW	BRA	Rafael Elias
43	DF	BRA	João Marcelo (on loan from Porto)
80	MF	BRA	Robert
91	GK	BRA	Gabriel Mesquita
96	MF	BRA	Matheus Pereira (on loan from Al Hilal)
98	GK	BRA	Anderson
99	FW	BRA	Gilberto

=== Youth players ===
Note: Flags indicate national team as defined under FIFA eligibility rules; some limited exceptions apply. Players may hold more than one non-FIFA nationality.

No.	Pos.	Nation	Player
35	DF	BRA	Pedrão
77	MF	BRA	Japa

No.	Pos.	Nation	Player
—	DF	BRA	Ruan Santos

=== Out on loan ===
Note: Flags indicate national team as defined under FIFA eligibility rules; some limited exceptions apply. Players may hold more than one non-FIFA nationality.

No.	Pos.	Nation	Player
—	GK	BRA	Rodrigo Bazilio (at Athletic until 31 October 2023)
—	DF	BRA	Luis Felipe (at Tombense until 31 December 2023)
—	MF	BRA	Claudinho (at Confiança until 31 December 2024)
—	MF	BRA	Daniel Júnior (at Akhmat Grozny until 25 May 2024)
—	MF	BRA	Igor Lemos (a Democrata-GV until 29 October 2023)
—	MF	BRA	João Paulo (at CRB until 31 December 2023)

No.	Pos.	Nation	Player
—	MF	BRA	Neto Moura (at Mirassol until 25 November 2023)
—	FW	BRA	Arielson (at Polissya Zhytomyr until 30 June 2024)
—	FW	BRA	Bruno José (at Guarani until 31 December 2023)
—	FW	BRA	Matheus Davó (at Pafos until 30 June 2024)
—	FW	BRA	Vitor Leque (at Remo until 1 October 2023)
—	FW	BRA	Waguininho (at Avaí until 31 December 2023)

=== First-team staff ===
Position	Name	Nationality
Head coach	Paulo Autuori	BRA
Assistant coach	Vacant	
Goalkeeping coach	Rogério Lima	BRA
Fitness coaches	Leonardo Almeida	BRA
Fitness coaches	Rodrigo Saar	BRA
Fitness coaches	Túlio Flôres	BRA
Performance analyst	André Batista	BRA
Performance analyst	Victor Flores	BRA

== Competitions ==
=== Overview ===
Competition	First match	Last match	Starting round	Final position	Record							
Competition	First match	Last match	Starting round	Final position	Pld	W	D	L	GF	GA	GD	Win %
Campeonato Mineiro	21 January	19 March	First stage	Semi-finals	10	3	3	4	12	11	+1	30.00
Copa do Brasil	13 April	31 May	Third round	Round of 16	4	1	1	2	3	3	+0	25.00
Campeonato Brasileiro Série A	16 April	6 December	Matchday 1	14th	38	11	14	13	35	32	+3	28.95
Total					52	15	18	19	50	46	+4	28.85

Source: Competitions

=== Campeonato Mineiro ===
==== First stage ====
Pos	Team	Pld	W	D	L	GF	GA	GD	Pts	Qualification or relegation
1	Cruzeiro	8	3	3	2	11	7	+4	12	Knockout stage
2	Tombense	8	3	2	3	14	12	+2	11	
3	Democrata-GV	8	2	4	2	8	10	−2	10	
4	Ipatinga	8	2	3	3	9	11	−2	9	

Source: FMF

21 January 1	Patrocinense	1–2	Cruzeiro	Patrocínio
19:00 UTC−3	Cristiano Robert 52'	Report	Nikão 7'; Bruno Rodrigues 15'	Stadium: Pedro Alves do Nascimento; Attendance: 3,997; Referee: Paulo Cesar Zanovelli da Silva

28 January 2	Cruzeiro	1–1	Athletic Club	Belo Horizonte
10:30 UTC−3	Nikão 51' (pen.)	Report	Welinton 12'	Stadium: Independência; Attendance: 21,557; Referee: Antonio Márcio Teixeira da Silva

4 February 3	Cruzeiro	0–1	América Mineiro	Brasília
16:30 UTC−3		Report	Henrique Almeida 77'	Stadium: Mané Garrincha; Attendance: 13,631; Referee: André Policarpo Bento

7 February 4	Cruzeiro	0–1	Pouso Alegre	Belo Horizonte
21:30 UTC−3		Report	Gabriel Carioca 11'	Stadium: Independência; Attendance: 14,968; Referee: Murilo Misson Júnior

13 February 5	Cruzeiro	1–1	Atlético Mineiro	Belo Horizonte
20:00 UTC−3	Bruno Rodrigues 61'	Report	Hulk 80'	Stadium: Independência; Attendance: 20,449; Referee: Paulo Cesar Zanovelli da Silva

18 February 6	Villa Nova	0–4	Cruzeiro	Nova Lima
19:00 UTC−3		Report	Gilberto 28', 40', 57' (pen.); Mateus Vital 85'	Stadium: Castor Cifuentes; Attendance: 3,245; Referee: Wanderson Alves de Souza

23 February 7	Caldense	1–2	Cruzeiro	Poços de Caldas
16:30 UTC−3	Patrick 64'	Report	Daniel Júnior 16'; Bruno Rodrigues 37' (pen.)	Stadium: Ronaldão; Attendance: 2,790; Referee: Murilo Misson Júnior

4 March 8	Cruzeiro	1–1	Democrata-SL	Cariacica
16:30 UTC−3	Bruno Rodrigues 38'	Report	William Mineiro 45+3'	Stadium: Kléber Andrade; Attendance: 6,589; Referee: Ronei Cândido Alves

==== Knockout stage ====
===== Semi-finals =====
11 March First leg	Cruzeiro	0–2	América Mineiro	Sete Lagoas
16:30 UTC−3		Report	Aloísio 24'; Juninho 61'	Stadium: Arena do Jacaré; Attendance: 19,227; Referee: Paulo Cesar Zanovelli da Silva

19 March Second leg	América Mineiro	2–1 (4–1 agg.)	Cruzeiro	Belo Horizonte
18:00 UTC−3	Aloísio 33'; Alê 89'	Report	Lucas Oliveira 76'	Stadium: Independência; Attendance: 5,132; Referee: André Policarpo Bento

=== Campeonato Brasileiro Série A ===
==== League table ====
Pos	Team	Pld	W	D	L	GF	GA	GD	Pts	Qualification or relegation
12	Cuiabá	38	14	9	15	40	39	+1	51	Qualification for Copa Sudamericana group stage
13	Corinthians	38	12	14	12	47	48	−1	50	Qualification for Copa Sudamericana group stage
14	Cruzeiro	38	11	14	13	35	32	+3	47	Qualification for Copa Sudamericana group stage
15	Vasco da Gama	38	12	9	17	41	51	−10	45	
16	Bahia	38	12	8	18	50	53	−3	44	

Source: CBF
Rules for classification: 1) points; 2) wins; 3) goal difference; 4) goals scored; 5) head-to-head results (only between two teams); 6) fewest red cards; 7) fewest yellow cards; 8) drawing of lots.

==== Results by round ====
Round	1	2	3	4	5	6	7	8	9	10	11	12	13	14	15	16	17	18	19	20	21	22	23	24	25	26	27	28	29	30	31	32	33	34	35	36	37	38
Ground	A	H	A	H	H	A	H	A	H	A	H	H	A	A	H	H	A	H	A	H	A	H	A	A	H	A	H	A	H	A	A	H	H	A	A	H	A	H
Result	L	W	W	W	L	W	L	D	L	D	L	W	D	W	D	L	D	D	L	D	L	D	W	L	D	D	L	W	W	W	L	L	D	L	W	D	D	D
Position	13	12	6	3	5	4	5	6	10	9	12	12	12	9	10	11	10	11	12	12	12	12	11	12	12	13	15	14	13	16	16	17	16	17	13	14	14	14

Source: Matches
A = Away; H = Home; W = Win; D = Draw; L = Loss

==== Matches ====
16 April 1	Corinthians	2–1	Cruzeiro	Arena Corinthians
16:00 UTC−3	Matheus Araújo 68'; Róger Guedes 87'	Report	Lucas Oliveira 90+5'	Stadium: São Paulo; Attendance: 41,304; Referee: Anderson Daronco

22 April 2	Cruzeiro	1–0	Grêmio	Belo Horizonte
21:00 UTC−3	Bruno Rodrigues 64'	Report		Stadium: Arena Independência; Attendance: 21,605; Referee: Flávio Rodrigues de Souza

29 April 3	Red Bull Bragantino	0–3	Cruzeiro	Bragança Paulista
18:30 UTC−3		Report	Ramiro 1'; Gilberto 64'; Bruno Rodrigues 86'	Stadium: Nabi Abi Chedid; Attendance: 4,829; Referee: Bráulio da Silva Machado

6 May 4	Cruzeiro	2–1	Santos	Belo Horizonte
16:00 UTC−3	Wesley 21', 61'	Report	Ângelo 57'	Stadium: Arena Independência; Attendance: 21,191; Referee: Bruno Arleu de Araújo

10 May 5	Cruzeiro	0–2	Fluminense	Belo Horizonte
21:30 UTC−3		Report	Ganso 43'; Cano 53'	Stadium: Mineirão; Attendance: 51,846; Referee: Flávio Rodrigues de Souza

14 May 6	América Mineiro	0–4	Cruzeiro	Belo Horizonte
18:30 UTC−3		Report	Henrique Dourado 32'; Marlon 69'; Gilberto 83', 90'	Stadium: Independência; Attendance: 4,295; Referee: Wilton Pereira Sampaio

22 May 7	Cruzeiro	0–1	Cuiabá	Sete Lagoas
20:00 UTC−3		Report	Deyverson 36'	Stadium: Arena do Jacaré; Attendance: 15,722; Referee: Sávio Pereira Sampaio

27 May 8	Flamengo	1–1	Cruzeiro	Rio de Janeiro
18:30 UTC−3	Ayrton Lucas 32'	Report	Marlon 5'	Stadium: Maracanã; Attendance: 65,270; Referee: Luiz Flávio de Oliveira

3 June 9	Cruzeiro	0–1	Atlético Mineiro	Uberlândia
18:30 UTC−3		Report	Hulk 26'	Stadium: Parque do Sabiá; Attendance: 34,310; Referee: Sávio Pereira Sampaio

10 June 10	Bahia	2–2	Cruzeiro	Salvador
18:30 UTC−3	Kayky 17'; Arthur Sales 65'	Report	Bruno Rodrigues 30'; Wesley 45'	Stadium: Fonte Nova; Attendance: 33,679; Referee: Rodrigo Pereira de Lima

21 June 11	Cruzeiro	0–1	Fortaleza	Belo Horizonte
19:00 UTC−3		Report	Lucero 79'	Stadium: Mineirão; Attendance: 28,494; Referee: Bruno Arleu de Araújo

24 June 12	Cruzeiro	1–0	São Paulo	Belo Horizonte
21:00 UTC−3	Rafinha 3' (o.g.)	Report		Stadium: Arena Independência; Attendance: 17,478; Referee: Ramon Abatti Abel

1 July 13	Internacional	0–0	Cruzeiro	Porto Alegre
21:00 UTC−3		Report		Stadium: Beira-Rio; Attendance: 24,672; Referee: Wagner Magalhães

8 July 14	Vasco da Gama	0–1	Cruzeiro	Rio de Janeiro
16:00 UTC−3		Report	Machado 45+3'	Stadium: São Januário; Attendance: 0 Referee: Sávio Pereira Sampaio

16 July 15	Cruzeiro	0–0	Coritiba	Belo Horizonte
11:00 UTC−3		Report		Stadium: Arena Independência; Attendance: 22,123; Referee: Leandro Pedro Vuaden

23 July 16	Cruzeiro	0–1	Goiás	Belo Horizonte
16:00 UTC−3		Report	João Magno 27'	Stadium: Arena Independência; Attendance: 21,688; Referee: Caio Max Augusto Vieira

29 July 17	Athletico Paranaense	3–3	Cruzeiro	Curitiba
16:00 UTC−3	Madson 41'; Pablo 77'; Fernandinho 86' (pen.)	Report	Arthur Gomes 7', 36'; Wesley 81'	Stadium: Arena da Baixada; Attendance: 22,730; Referee: Yuri Elino da Cruz

6 August 18	Cruzeiro	0–0	Botafogo	Belo Horizonte
18:30 UTC−3		Report		Stadium: Mineirão; Attendance: 44,759; Referee: Raphael Claus

14 August 19	Palmeiras	1–0	Cruzeiro	São Paulo
19:00 UTC−3	Flaco López 90+5'	Report		Stadium: Allianz Parque; Attendance: 38,555; Referee: Wagner Magalhães

19 August 20	Cruzeiro	1–1	Corinthians	Belo Horizonte
21:00 UTC−3	Rafael Elias 44'	Report	Gustavo Mosquito 90+7'	Stadium: Mineirão; Attendance: 36,202; Referee: Rafael Klein

27 August 21	Grêmio	3–0	Cruzeiro	Porto Alegre
19:00 UTC−3	Suárez 28'; Carballo 53'; Pepê 77'	Report		Stadium: Arena do Grêmio; Attendance: 23,099; Referee: Marcelo de Lima Henrique

3 September 22	Cruzeiro	0–0	Red Bull Bragantino	Belo Horizonte
18:30 UTC−3		Report		Stadium: Mineirão; Attendance: 29,419; Referee: Wagner Magalhães

14 September 23	Santos	0–3	Cruzeiro	Santos
19:00 UTC−3		Report	Matheus Jussa 40'; Bruno Rodrigues 70'; Nikão 89'	Stadium: Vila Belmiro; Attendance: 12,244; Referee: Bráulio da Silva Machado

20 September 24	Fluminense	1–0	Cruzeiro	Rio de Janeiro
21:30 UTC−3	Leo Fernández 66'	Report		Stadium: Maracanã; Attendance: 28,985; Referee: Matheus Candançan

1 October 25	Cruzeiro	1–1	América Mineiro	Belo Horizonte
16:00 UTC−3	Luciano Castán 20'	Report	Benítez 28'	Stadium: Mineirão; Attendance: 44,279; Referee: Leandro Pedro Vuaden

14 October 26	Cuiabá	0–0	Cruzeiro	Cuiabá
21:00 UTC−3		Report		Stadium: Arena Pantanal; Attendance: 12,100; Referee: Rodrigo José Pereira de Lima

19 October 27	Cruzeiro	0–2	Flamengo	Belo Horizonte
19:00 UTC−3		Report	Ayrton Lucas 38'; Pedro 43' (pen.)	Stadium: Mineirão; Attendance: 37,073; Referee: Rafael Rodrigo Klein

22 October 28	Atlético Mineiro	0–1	Cruzeiro	Belo Horizonte
16:00 UTC−3		Report	Jemerson 87' (o.g.)	Stadium: Arena MRV; Attendance: 42,058; Referee: Ramon Abatti Abel

25 October 29	Cruzeiro	3–0	Bahia	Belo Horizonte
20:00 UTC−3	Kanu 19' (o.g.); Marlon 53'; Bruno Rodrigues 88'	Report		Stadium: Mineirão; Attendance: 36,104; Referee: Flávio Rodrigues de Souza

2 November 31	São Paulo	1–0	Cruzeiro	São Paulo
20:00 UTC−3	Luciano 84'	Report		Stadium: Morumbi; Attendance: 50,570; Referee: Wilton Pereira Sampaio

5 November 32	Cruzeiro	1–2	Internacional	Belo Horizonte
16:00 UTC−3	Bruno Rodrigues 90+2' (pen.)	Report	Maurício 14'; Wanderson 52'	Stadium: Mineirão; Attendance: 36,801; Referee: Matheus Candançan

11 November 34	Coritiba	1–0	Cruzeiro	Curitiba
16:00 UTC−3	Robson 90+1'	Report		Stadium: Vila Capanema; Attendance: 6,474; Referee: Bráulio da Silva Machado

18 November 30	Fortaleza	0–1	Cruzeiro	Fortaleza
18:30 UTC−3		Report	Bruno Rodrigues 80'	Stadium: Castelão; Attendance: 30,804; Referee: Sávio Pereira Sampaio

22 November 33	Cruzeiro	2–2	Vasco da Gama	Belo Horizonte
19:00 UTC−3	Arthur Gomes 41'; Bruno Rodrigues 45+9' (pen.)	Report	Puma Rodríguez 15'; Gabriel Pec 77'	Stadium: Mineirão; Attendance: 0 Referee: Leandro Pedro Vuaden

27 November 35	Goiás	0–1	Cruzeiro	Goiânia
20:00 UTC−3		Report	Robert 90+6'	Stadium: Serrinha; Referee: Ramon Abatti Abel

30 November 36	Cruzeiro	1–1	Athletico Paranaense	Belo Horizonte
20:00 UTC−3	Matheus Pereira 84'	Report	Vitor Roque 65'	Stadium: Mineirão; Attendance: 36,696; Referee: Leandro Pedro Vuaden

3 December 37	Botafogo	0–0	Cruzeiro	Rio de Janeiro
18:30 UTC−3		Report		Stadium: Nilton Santos; Attendance: 15,462; Referee: Wilton Pereira Sampaio

6 December 38	Cruzeiro	1–1	Palmeiras	Belo Horizonte
21:30 UTC−3	Nikão 80'	Report	Endrick 21'	Stadium: Mineirão; Attendance: 44,190; Referee: Anderson Daronco

=== Copa do Brasil ===
As Cruzeiro was the 2022 Campeonato Brasileiro Série B, the club entered the Copa do Brasil in the third round.

==== Third round ====
13 April First leg	Náutico	1–0	Cruzeiro	Recife
19:00 UTC−3	Gabriel Santiago 87'	Report		Stadium: Aflitos; Attendance: 6,435; Referee: Marcelo de Lima Henrique

25 April Second leg	Cruzeiro	2–0 (2–1 agg.)	Náutico	Belo Horizonte
19:00 UTC−3	William 54'; Richard 89'	Report		Stadium: Arena Independência; Attendance: 21,675; Referee: Luiz Flávio de Oliveira

==== Round of 16 ====
17 May First leg	Grêmio	1–1	Cruzeiro	Porto Alegre
19:30 UTC−3	Suárez 79'	Report	Bruno Rodrigues 8'	Stadium: Arena do Grêmio; Attendance: 27,522; Referee: Raphael Claus

31 May Second leg	Cruzeiro	0–1 (1–2 agg.)	Grêmio	Belo Horizonte
20:00 UTC−3		Report	Villasanti 27'	Stadium: Mineirão; Attendance: 41,090; Referee: Flávio Rodrigues de Souza
