= Lupercio =

Lupercio may refer to:

- Lupércio, a municipality in the state of São Paulo, Brazil
- Lupercio (Dungeons & Dragons), a demon lord in the Dungeons & Dragons roleplaying game
- San Lupercio (Saint Lupercus), see Marcellus of Tangier
