= Kaiki Bruno =

Brazilian footballer (born 2003)

- Kaiki Bruno in 2023

Personal information
- Full name: Kaiki Bruno da Silva
- Date of birth: 8 March 2003 (age 23)
- Place of birth: Betim, Brazil
- Height: 1.72 m (5 ft 8 in)
- Position: Left-back

Team information
- Current team: Como (on loan from Cruzeiro)
- Number: 16

Youth career
- 2014–2022: Cruzeiro

Senior career*
Years	Team	Apps	(Gls)
2021–	Cruzeiro	126	(2)
2026–	→ Como (loan)	2	(1)

International career^{‡}
2022	Brazil U20	2	(0)
2026–	Brazil	1	(0)
Medal record
Men's football
Representing Brazil
South American U-20 Championship
Winner	2023 Colombia
- * Club domestic league appearances and goals as of 19:38, 14 September 2026 (UTC) ‡ National team caps and goals as of 1 April 2026

Kaiki Bruno da Silva (born 8 March 2003), known simply as Kaiki, is a Brazilian professional footballer who plays as a left-back for Serie A club Como, on loan from Campeonato Brasileiro Série A club Cruzeiro, and the Brazil national team.

== Club career ==
Born in Belo Horizonte, Kaiki started playing football at Betim's São Cristovão football school at the age of seven. He was discovered by the Italian scout, Michel Colosimo in a local game in Belo Horizonte's Favelas. At the age of ten, he featured in a local tournament organised by the Instituto Mineiro de Escolas de Futebol (IMEF), scoring 15 goals and catching the attention of Cruzeiro, whom he would go on to join a year later. At the same time, he was playing futsal at Olympico Club.

Kaiki joined Italian side Como on loan in July 2026, including an obligation to buy at the end of the loan spell.

== International career ==
Kaiki has represented Brazil at under-20 level.

On 31 March 2026, he made his debut for the senior national team in a friendly against Croatia, which Brazil won 3–1.

== Career statistics ==
=== Club ===
As of match played 14 September 2026

Appearances and goals by club, season and competition
Club	Season	League			State league (Note: Includes Campeonato Mineiro)		National cup (Note: Includes Copa do Brasil)		Continental		Total	
Club	Season	Division	Apps	Goals	Apps	Goals	Apps	Goals	Apps	Goals	Apps	Goals
Cruzeiro	2021	Série B	0	0	1	0	2	0	—		3	0
Cruzeiro	2022	Série B	6	0	0	0	0	0	—		6	0
Cruzeiro	2023	Série A	8	0	5	0	1	0	—		14	0
Cruzeiro	2024	Série A	18	1	0	0	0	0	5 (Note: Appearance(s) in Copa Sudamericana)	0	23	1
Cruzeiro	2025	Série A	34	1	8	0	8	0	1	0	51	1
Cruzeiro	2026	Série A	16	0	8	0	2	0	6 (Note: Appearances in Copa Libertadores)	0	32	0
Cruzeiro	Total		104	2	22	0	13	0	12	0	151	2
Como (loan)	2026–27	Serie A	2	1	—		0	0	0	0	2	1
Career total			106	3	22	0	13	0	12	0	153	3

=== International ===
As of match played 31 March 2026

Appearances and goals by national team and year
National team	Year	Apps	Goals
Brazil	2026	1	0
Total		1	0
