= Bruno Rodrigues (footballer, born 1997) =

Brazilian footballer

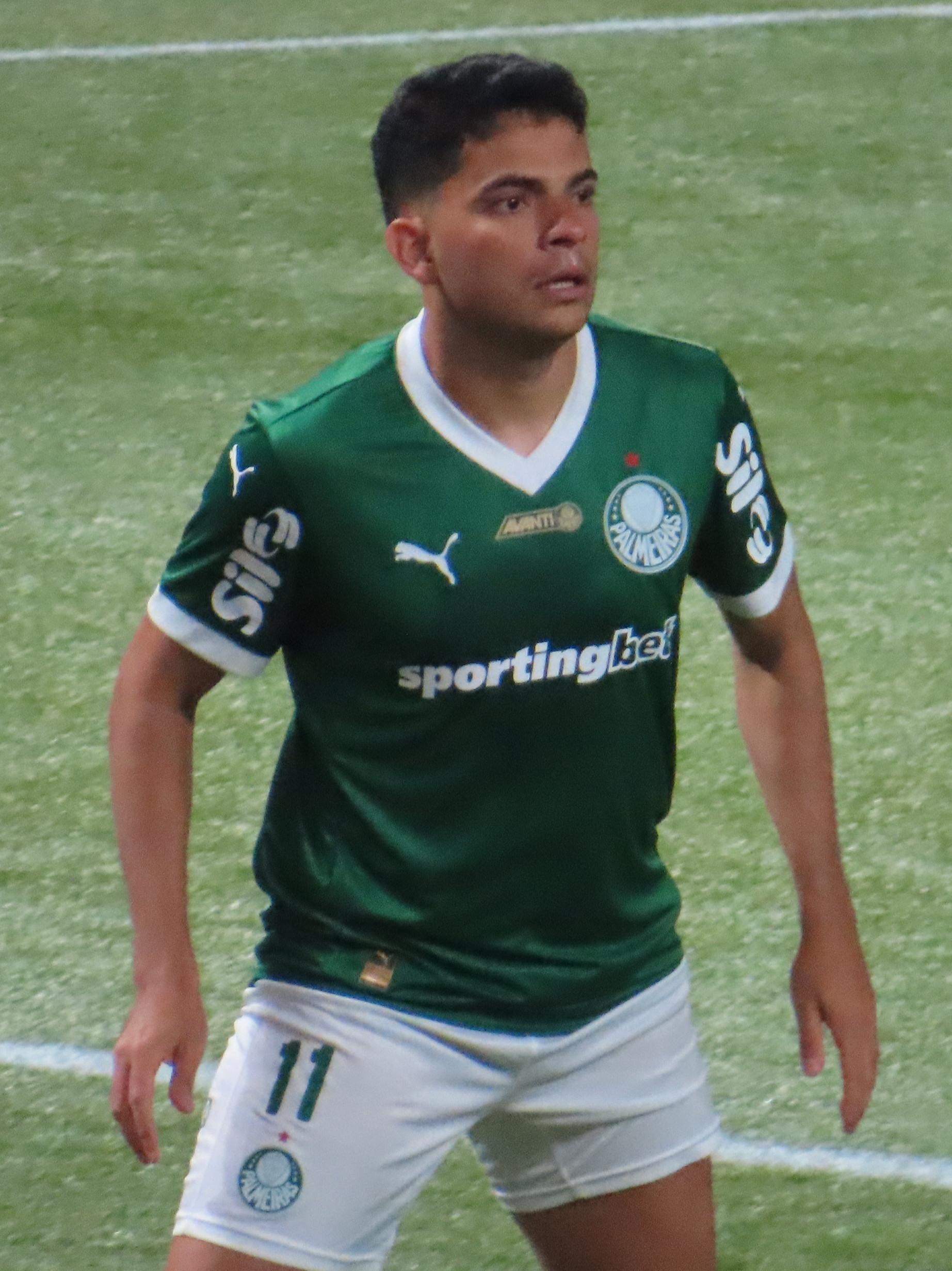
- Rodrigues playing for Palmeiras in 2025

Personal information
- Full name: Bruno Rafael Rodrigues do Nascimento
- Date of birth: 7 March 1997 (age 29)
- Place of birth: Ceará-Mirim, Brazil
- Height: 1.77 m (5 ft 10 in)
- Positions: Winger; forward

Team information
- Current team: Cruzeiro
- Number: 9

Youth career
- 2014–2017: Athletico Paranaense

Senior career*
Years	Team	Apps	(Gls)
2017–2019	Athletico Paranaense	11	(1)
2017	→ Joinville (loan)	19	(1)
2018	→ Doxa Katokopia (loan)	9	(0)
2019	→ Paraná (loan)	30	(3)
2020–2023	Tombense	0	(0)
2020	→ Ponte Preta (loan)	43	(11)
2021	→ São Paulo (loan)	5	(0)
2021–2022	→ Famalicão (loan)	33	(5)
2022–2023	→ Cruzeiro (loan)	63	(16)
2024–	Palmeiras	12	(2)
2026–	→ Cruzeiro (loan)	6	(1)
- * Club domestic league appearances and goals as of 9 April 2026

Bruno Rafael Rodrigues do Nascimento (born 7 March 1997), known as Bruno Rodrigues, is a Brazilian professional footballer who plays as a winger or forward for Série A club Cruzeiro, on loan from Palmeiras.

== Club career ==
Born in Ceará-Mirim, Rodrigues joined the youth setup of Atlético Paranaense in 2014. In the 2015 edition of the Brazil U20 Cup, he emerged as the joint top-scorer with three goals. On 29 January 2017, Rodrigues made his first team and Campeonato Paranaense debut in a 1–1 draw against Rio Branco Sport Club, where he contributed with one assist.

On 2 March 2017, Rodrigues joined Joinville on a three-month-long loan deal. His loan deal was extended till the end of the year in April. After having contributed with two goals, he was recalled from Joinville by his parent club on 29 September 2017.

On 1 January 2018, Rodrigues was loaned to Cypriot club Doxa Katokopia for six months.

After his contract with Athletico Paranaense was terminated, Rodrigues signed with Tombense in December 2019 and was immediately loaned out to Ponte Preta for the 2020 season.

== Club statistics ==
As of match played 7 December 2023

Appearances and goals by club, season and competition
Club	Season	League			State league		National cup		League cup		Continental		Total	
Club	Season	Division	Apps	Goals	Apps	Goals	Apps	Goals	Apps	Goals	Apps	Goals	Apps	Goals
Athletico Paranaense	2017	Série A	0	0	3 (Note: Appearances in Campeonato Paranaense)	0	0	0	—		0	0	3	0
Athletico Paranaense	2019	Série A	0	0	8	1	0	0	—		0	0	8	1
Athletico Paranaense	Total		0	0	11	1	0	0	—		0	0	11	1
Joinville (loan)	2017	Série C	12	1	7 (Note: Appearances in Campeonato Catarinense)	0	2	1	—		—		21	2
Doxa Katokopias (loan)	2017–18	Cypriot First Division	9	0	—		4	0	—		—		13	0
Paraná (loan)	2019	Série B	30	3	0	0	0	0	—		—		30	3
Tombense	2020	Série C	0	0	0	0	—		—		—		0	0
Ponte Preta (loan)	2020	Série B	29	7	14 (Note: Appearances in Campeonato Paulista)	4	4	0	—		—		47	11
São Paulo (loan)	2021	Série A	1	0	4	0	0	0	—		1 (Note: Appearance in Copa Libertadores)	0	6	0
Famalicão (loan)	2021–22	Primeira Liga	33	5	—		3	1	4	2	—		40	8
Cruzeiro (loan)	2022	Série B	18	4	0	0	0	0	—		—		18	4
Cruzeiro (loan)	2023	Série A	35	8	10 (Note: Appearances in Campeonato Mineiro)	4	4	1	—		—		49	13
Cruzeiro (loan)	Total		53	12	10	4	4	1	—		—		67	17
Palmeiras	2024	Série A	0	0	0	0	0	0	—		0	0	0	0
Career total			167	28	46	9	17	3	4	2	1	0	235	42

== Honours ==
Athletico Paranaense

- Campeonato Paranaense: 2019

São Paulo

- Campeonato Paulista: 2021

Cruzeiro

- Campeonato Brasileiro Série B: 2022

Palmeiras

- Campeonato Paulista: 2024
