= Welinton (footballer, born 1999) =

Brazilian footballer

Personal information
- Full name: Welinton Macedo dos Santos
- Date of birth: 30 June 1999 (age 27)
- Place of birth: Taguaí, Brazil
- Height: 1.83 m (6 ft 0 in)
- Position: Winger

Team information
- Current team: Santa Clara
- Number: 11

Youth career
- PSTC
- Atlético Mineiro
- Athletico Paranaense
- Cruzeiro

Senior career*
Years	Team	Apps	(Gls)
2019–2021	Cruzeiro	31	(2)
2021	→ Inter de Limeira (loan)	8	(0)
2021	→ Brasil de Pelotas (loan)	7	(0)
2021–2022	Novorizontino	11	(1)
2022	Ferroviária	13	(3)
2023	Athletic	10	(3)
2023	Criciúma	11	(0)
2024–2025	Athletic	74	(9)
2026–	Santa Clara	22	(1)
- * Club domestic league appearances and goals as of 20 September 2026

Welinton Macedo dos Santos (born 30 June 1999), known as Welinton Torrão or simply as Welinton, is a Brazilian professional footballer who plays as a winger for Primeira Liga club Santa Clara.

== Life and career ==
Welinton Macedo dos Santos was born in Taguaí, São Paulo on 30 June 1999. In his native city, he used to run the 100-meter dash and has great speed despite being 1,83 height. Welinton started his career in the Paraná Soccer Technical Center (PSTC) youth team before passing through the youth ranks of Atlético Mineiro and Athletico Paranaense. In 2019, he signed with Cruzeiro in order to play the Campeonato Brasileiro Sub-20. After some good performances with the U20 team, Welinton was promoted, by coach Mano Menezes, to Cruzeiro senior team. On 27 July 2019, he made his professional debut in the Campeonato Brasileiro, replacing Maurício at the 69th minute of the match against Athletico Paranaense.

On 9 December 2025, Welinton moved to Portugal, joining Primeira Liga club Santa Clara on a contract until June 2028.

== Career statistics ==
As of match played 20 September 2026

Appearances and goals by club, season and competition
Club	Season	League			State League		Cup		Continental		Other		Total	
Club	Season	Division	Apps	Goals	Apps	Goals	Apps	Goals	Apps	Goals	Apps	Goals	Apps	Goals
Cruzeiro	2019	Série A	1	0	—		0	0	—		—		1	0
Cruzeiro	2020	Série B	22	1	8	1	1	0	—		—		31	2
Cruzeiro	2021	Série B	0	0	0	0	0	0	—		—		0	0
Cruzeiro	Total		23	1	8	1	1	0	0	0	0	0	32	2
Inter de Limeira (loan)	2021	Série D	0	0	8	0	—		—		—		8	0
Brasil de Pelotas (loan)	2021	Série B	7	0	—		—		—		—		7	0
Novorizontino	2021	Série C	7	1	—		—		—		—		7	1
Novorizontino	2022	Série C	0	0	4	0	1	0	—		—		5	0
Novorizontino	Total		7	1	4	0	1	0	—		—		12	1
Ferroviária	2022	Série D	13	3	—		—		—		—		13	3
Athletic	2023	Série C	0	0	10	3	1	0	—		—		11	3
Criciúma	2023	Série B	11	0	—		—		—		—		11	0
Athletic	2024	Série C	22	2	10	2	2	0	—		—		34	4
Athletic	2025	Série C	31	3	11	2	2	1	—		—		44	6
Athletic	Total		53	5	21	4	4	1	—		—		78	10
Santa Clara	2025–26	Primeira Liga	16	1	—		—		—		—		16	1
Santa Clara	2026–27	Primeira Liga	6	0	—		0	0	—		0	0	6	0
Santa Clara	Total		22	1	—		0	0	—		0	0	22	1
Career total			132	8	51	8	7	1	0	0	0	0	190	20
