= Marcelo Martins Moreno =

Bolivian footballer (born 1987)

Marcelo Moreno
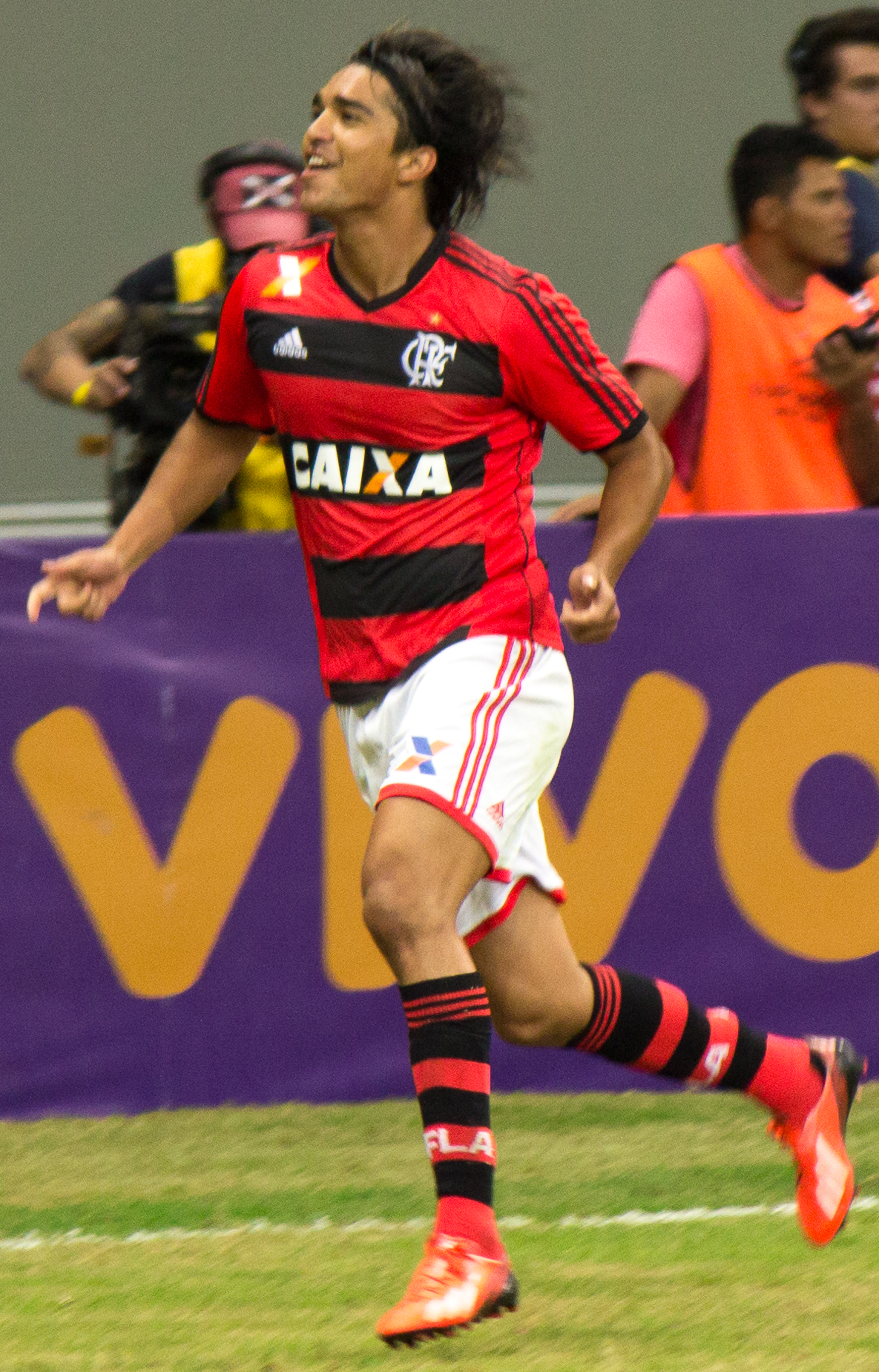
- Moreno playing for Flamengo in 2013

Personal information
- Full name: Marcelo Moreno Martins
- Date of birth: 18 June 1987 (age 39)
- Place of birth: Santa Cruz de la Sierra, Bolivia
- Height: 1.87 m (6 ft 2 in)
- Position: Striker

Team information
- Current team: Oriente Petrolero
- Number: 9

Youth career
- 2003–2004: Oriente Petrolero
- 2004–2005: Vitória

Senior career*
Years	Team	Apps	(Gls)
2003–2004	Oriente Petrolero	20	(2)
2005–2007	Vitória	56	(17)
2007–2008	Cruzeiro	25	(13)
2008–2011	Shakhtar Donetsk	32	(7)
2009	→ Werder Bremen (loan)	5	(0)
2010	→ Wigan Athletic (loan)	12	(0)
2012–2015	Grêmio	48	(18)
2013–2014	→ Flamengo (loan)	16	(2)
2014–2015	→ Cruzeiro (loan)	41	(19)
2015–2016	Changchun Yatai	53	(22)
2017–2018	Wuhan Zall	34	(25)
2019	Shijiazhuang Ever Bright	12	(7)
2020–2021	Cruzeiro	51	(9)
2022–2023	Cerro Porteño	30	(6)
2023	Independiente del Valle	20	(4)
2024	Cruzeiro	0	(0)
2026–	Oriente Petrolero	0	(0)

International career^{‡}
2005	Brazil U18	8	(6)
2006	Brazil U20	7	(5)
2007–2023	Bolivia	108	(31)
- * Club domestic league appearances and goals as of 10 Feb 2024 ‡ National team caps and goals as of 21 November 2023 (UTC)

Marcelo Martins Moreno (born 18 June 1987) is a Bolivian professional footballer who plays as a striker for División Profesional side Oriente Petrolero. Considered one of the greatest Bolivian players of all time, he is the national team's all-time capped player and all-time top goalscorer, with 108 caps and 31 goals.

== Club career ==
Moreno was born in Santa Cruz de la Sierra, Bolivia. He began his career at Oriente Petrolero. In 2003, Martins debuted for the club as a 16-year-old in Bolivia's Primera División.

He moved to Vitória, becoming first choice in 2006, at the Campeonato Brasileiro Série C. He scored 12 goals in the competition, four less than the top goalscorer. In the middle of 2007, he moved to Cruzeiro, becoming first choice only in the next year, when he scored 8 goals at the 2008 Copa Libertadores, being the top goalscorer, alongside Salvador Cabañas.

On 27 May 2008, he signed a five-year contract with Shakhtar Donetsk. The Ukrainian club agreed to pay €9 million for the player. On 1 November, he scored a brace in a 3–1 league match win against Zorya Luhansk. Even though he had won the 2008–09 UEFA Cup, on 29 May 2009, unable to establish himself in Donetsk, Moreno joined German club Werder Bremen on loan. Bremen had initially attempted to sign Moreno the previous summer, but the player opted for Shakhtar.

In a 2009 interview, Martins remarked that he didn't want to go to Ukraine at the moment of signing with Shakhtar, but that was the way the negotiation was produced. He commented that it was a difficult moment but it was a moment of adaptation to a new football.

In 2009, he said that when speaking in Portuguese with teammates Naldo and Hugo Almeida that he would feel Brazilian, that Brazil was an important country in his life cause he lived in it for half of his life.

On 2 August 2009, he scored a double in a 2009–10 DFB-Pokal match that ended in a 5–0 victory against Union Berlin. On 29 January 2010, Bremen terminated his contract and he returned to Shakhtar Donetsk. On transfer deadline day, a six-month loan deal between Shakhtar and Wigan Athletic was agreed to take the player to the Premier League. He signed for them on 1 February on loan. After returning to Shakhtar, he made a decent impression, scoring 7 times in 23 appearances. However, after being listed as a reserve the next season, Moreno joined Grêmio in late December 2011 and signed a five-year contract with the Brazilian team starting in 2012. He was then loaned to Flamengo in the 2013 season and Cruzeiro in 2014.

In February 2015, Moreno transferred to Chinese Super League side Changchun Yatai. His first season in China was successful, scoring 20+ goals in 53 games. In 2017 he signed for Wuhan Zall in the Chinese League One being the joint top scorer in his first season with 23 league goals, along with Colombian Harold Preciado. In 2019 Moreno signed with Shijiazhuang Ever Bright. Although he only played 12 games with them, he scored 7 goals.

On 19 February 2020, Moreno returned for his former club, Cruzeiro, signing with them for 3 seasons.

On 30 January 2022, ABC Color announced that Martins would join Primera División Paraguaya team Cerro Porteño. He would be the attacking replacement of Argentine Mauro Boselli. The transfer took effect on 9 February 2022 of Paraguay's summer transfer window. On 10 February, Martins arrived to Paraguay and was officially presented at Cerro Porteño. He signed for two years. He was presented with the number 9 shirt. His salary would not be paid by the club, instead by a private company would. Before signing, Martins spoke with Cerro Porteño coach Francisco Arce, who sent him videos so he can adapt to his play as quick as possible. Martins remarked that Arce was important so that he could join Cerro Porteño. His arrival into Paraguay was made through Cerro Porteño's director, Miguel Carrizosa, who lent his airplane to bring Martins. He became Cerro Porteño's 5th signing ahead of the 2022 Primera División season, following William Riveros, Robert Piris Da Motta, Sergio Díaz and Alfio Oviedo.

== International career ==
Born in Bolivia to a Brazilian father (Mauro Martins, former footballer) and Bolivian mother, Moreno played for the Brazilian under-18 and under-20 sides at the youth level, becoming the first foreign player to be part of this youth setup and the fifth foreign player to wear the Brazilian national team's shirt in an official match, but chose to represent the Bolivian senior national team as a professional.

Due to his success playing for Cruzeiro, Moreno received his first call-up for a friendly match against Peru on 12 September 2007. He scored his first two international goals on 20 November 2007, during a 2010 World Cup qualifier against Venezuela. On 14 October 2008, he scored both of Bolivia's goals against Uruguay in a 2–2 draw. He also opened the scoring in Bolivia's historic 6–1 victory over Diego Maradona's Argentina on 1 April 2009. A few months later, in October, he scored the winning goal in a 2–1 victory against powerhouse Brazil at Estadio Hernando Siles.

Moreno was included in the Bolivia squad for the 2015 Copa América in Chile. On 15 June, he scored the decisive goal in the team's second group match – a 3–2 defeat of Ecuador – to give La Verde its first win at the Copa América since the 1997 tournament. He was Bolivia's top scorer at the tournament with two goals, also being the only Bolivian player to score in the knockout stage as the side lost 3–1 to Peru in the quarter-finals. Moreno announced his retirement from the national squad on 15 September 2015 together with then captain Ronald Raldes, claiming divergences with head coach Julio César Baldivieso.

Moreno returned to the national squad in 2016 after Guillermo Ángel Hoyos replaced Baldivieso.

On 12 November 2020, Moreno scored his 20th international goal in a 3–2 defeat to Ecuador, equaling Joaquín Botero's all-time top goalscoring record for Bolivia. On 28 March 2023, he played his 100th international match for Bolivia, in which he also scored a goal in a 2–1 win in a friendly match against Saudi Arabia.

== Career statistics ==
=== Club ===
Appearances and goals by club, season and competition
Club	Season	League			State league		Cup		Continental		Other		Total	
Club	Season	Division	Apps	Goals	Apps	Goals	Apps	Goals	Apps	Goals	Apps	Goals	Apps	Goals
Oriente Petrolero	2003	Liga de Fútbol Boliviano	8	0	—		—		—		—		8	0
Oriente Petrolero	2004	Liga de Fútbol Boliviano	12	2	—		—		—		—		12	2
Oriente Petrolero	Total		20	2	—		—		—		—		20	2
Vitória	2005	Série B	—		—		—		—		—			
Vitória	2006	Série C	30	12	16	4	4	0	—		—		50	16
Vitória	2007	Série B	0	0	10	1	4	1	—		—		14	2
Vitória	Total		30	12	26	5	8	1	—		—		64	18
Cruzeiro	2007	Série A	13	6	—		—		1	0	—		14	6
Cruzeiro	2008	Série A	1	1	11	6	0	0	10	8	—		22	15
Cruzeiro	Total		14	7	11	6	0	0	11	8	—		36	21
Shakhtar	2008–09	Ukrainian Premier League	14	2	—		1	1	6	0	0	0	21	3
Shakhtar	2010–11	Ukrainian Premier League	18	5	—		2	2	3	0	0	0	23	7
Shakhtar	2011–12	Ukrainian Premier League	0	0	—		1	1	1	0	0	0	2	1
Shakhtar	Total		32	7	—		4	4	10	0	0	0	46	11
Werder Bremen (loan)	2009–10	Bundesliga	5	0	—		3	2	4	1	—		12	3
Wigan Athletic (loan)	2009–10	Premier League	12	0	—		0	0	—		—		12	0
Grêmio	2012	Série A	28	10	14	7	8	3	5	1	—		55	21
Grêmio	2013	Série A	—		2	0	—		3	0	—		5	0
Grêmio	2015	Série A	—		4	1	—		—		—		4	1
Grêmio	Total		28	10	20	8	8	3	8	1	—		64	22
Flamengo (loan)	2013	Série A	16	2	—		4	2	—		—		20	4
Cruzeiro (loan)	2014	Série A	32	15	9	4	7	4	4	0	—		52	23
Changchun Yatai	2015	Chinese Super League	24	9	—		0	0	—		—		24	9
Changchun Yatai	2016	Chinese Super League	29	13	—		0	0	—		—		29	13
Changchun Yatai	Total		53	47	—		0	0	—		—		53	22
Wuhan Zall	2017	China League One	29	23	—		0	0	—		—		29	23
Wuhan Zall	2018	China League One	5	2	—		0	0	—		—		5	2
Wuhan Zall	Total		34	25	—		0	0	—		—		34	25
Shijiazhuang Ever Bright	2019	China League One	12	7	—		1	1	—		—		13	8
Cruzeiro	2020	Série B	26	3	4	0	2	0	—		—		32	3
Cruzeiro	2021	Série B	17	5	4	1	1	0	—		—		22	6
Cruzeiro	Total		43	8	8	1	3	0	—		—		54	9
Cerro Porteño	2022	APF División de Honor	30	6	—		0	0	7	1	—		37	7
Cerro Porteño	2023	APF División de Honor	5	0	—		—		2	0	—		7	0
Cerro Porteño	Total		35	6	—		0	0	9	1	—		44	7
Independiente del Valle	2023	Ecuadorian Serie A	20	4	—		—		6	0	—		26	4
Cruzeiro	2024	Série A	—		0	0	—		0	0	—		0	0
Career total			386	127	74	24	38	17	52	11	0	0	550	179

=== International ===
As of match played 21 November 2023

Appearances and goals by national team and year
National team	Year	Apps	Goals
Bolivia	2007	4	2
Bolivia	2008	8	3
Bolivia	2009	6	2
Bolivia	2010	1	1
Bolivia	2011	12	2
Bolivia	2012	6	0
Bolivia	2013	9	2
Bolivia	2014	3	0
Bolivia	2015	6	2
Bolivia	2016	6	0
Bolivia	2017	6	1
Bolivia	2018	5	2
Bolivia	2019	4	1
Bolivia	2020	3	3
Bolivia	2021	13	7
Bolivia	2022	6	2
Bolivia	2023	10	1
Total		108	31

Scores and results list Bolivia's goal tally first, score column indicates score after each Moreno goal.

List of international goals scored by Marcelo Moreno
No.	Date	Venue	Opponent	Score	Result	Competition
1	20 November 2007	Estadio Polideportivo de Pueblo Nuevo, San Cristóbal, Venezuela	Venezuela	1–0	3–5	2010 FIFA World Cup qualification
2	20 November 2007	Estadio Polideportivo de Pueblo Nuevo, San Cristóbal, Venezuela	Venezuela	3–2	3–5	2010 FIFA World Cup qualification
3	18 June 2008	Estadio Hernando Siles, La Paz, Bolivia	Paraguay	4–1	4–2	2010 FIFA World Cup qualification
4	14 October 2008	Estadio Hernando Siles, La Paz, Bolivia	Uruguay	1–0	2–2	2010 FIFA World Cup qualification
5	14 October 2008	Estadio Hernando Siles, La Paz, Bolivia	Uruguay	2–0	2–2	2010 FIFA World Cup qualification
6	1 April 2009	Estadio Hernando Siles, La Paz, Bolivia	Argentina	1–0	6–1	2010 FIFA World Cup qualification
7	11 October 2009	Estadio Hernando Siles, La Paz, Bolivia	Brazil	2–0	2–1	2010 FIFA World Cup qualification
8	7 October 2010	Estadio Ramón Tahuichi Aguilera, Santa Cruz de la Sierra, Bolivia	Venezuela	1–3	1–3	Friendly
9	7 October 2011	Estadio Centenario, Montevideo, Uruguay	Uruguay	2–4	2–4	2014 FIFA World Cup qualification
10	11 November 2011	Estadio Monumental Antonio Vespucio Liberti, Buenos Aires, Argentina	Argentina	1–0	1–1	2014 FIFA World Cup qualification
11	26 March 2013	Estadio Hernando Siles, La Paz, Bolivia	Argentina	1–0	1–1	2014 FIFA World Cup qualification
12	11 June 2013	Estadio Nacional Julio Martínez Prádanos, Santiago, Chile	Chile	1–2	1–3	2014 FIFA World Cup qualification
13	15 June 2015	Estadio Elías Figueroa Brander, Valparaíso, Chile	Ecuador	3–0	3–2	2015 Copa América
14	25 June 2015	Estadio Municipal Germán Becker, Temuco, Chile	Peru	1–3	1–3	2015 Copa América
15	28 March 2017	Estadio Hernando Siles, La Paz, Bolivia	Argentina	2–0	2–0	2018 FIFA World Cup qualification
16	10 September 2018	Prince Faisal bin Fahd Stadium, Riyadh, Saudi Arabia	Saudi Arabia	2–2	2–2	Friendly
17	13 October 2018	Thuwunna Stadium, Yangon, Myanmar	Myanmar	2–0	3–0	Friendly
18	18 June 2019	Estádio do Maracanã, Rio de Janeiro, Brazil	Peru	1–0	1–3	2019 Copa América
19	13 October 2020	Estadio Hernando Siles, La Paz, Bolivia	Argentina	1–0	1–2	2022 FIFA World Cup qualification
20	12 November 2020	Estadio Hernando Siles, La Paz, Bolivia	Ecuador	2–2	2–3	2022 FIFA World Cup qualification
21	17 November 2020	Estadio Defensores del Chaco, Asunción, Paraguay	Paraguay	1–1	2–2	2022 FIFA World Cup qualification
22	26 March 2021	Estadio El Teniente, Rancagua, Chile	Chile	1–1	1–2	Friendly
23	3 June 2021	Estadio Hernando Siles, La Paz, Bolivia	Venezuela	1–0	3–1	2022 FIFA World Cup qualification
24	3 June 2021	Estadio Hernando Siles, La Paz, Bolivia	Venezuela	3–1	3–1	2022 FIFA World Cup qualification
25	8 June 2021	Estadio San Carlos de Apoquindo, Santiago, Chile	Chile	1–1	1–1	2022 FIFA World Cup qualification
26	5 September 2021	Estadio Campeón del Siglo, Montevideo, Uruguay	Uruguay	1–3	2–4	2022 FIFA World Cup qualification
27	5 September 2021	Estadio Campeón del Siglo, Montevideo, Uruguay	Uruguay	2–4	2–4	2022 FIFA World Cup qualification
28	16 November 2021	Estadio Hernando Siles, La Paz, Bolivia	Uruguay	2–0	3–0	2022 FIFA World Cup qualification
29	21 January 2022	Estadio Olímpico Patria, Sucre, Bolivia	Trinidad and Tobago	3–0	5–0	Friendly
30	1 February 2022	Estadio Hernando Siles, La Paz, Bolivia	Chile	2–3	2–3	2022 FIFA World Cup qualification
31	28 March 2023	Prince Abdullah Al Faisal Stadium, Jeddah, Saudi Arabia	Saudi Arabia	1–0	2–1	Friendly

== Honours ==
Vitória

- Campeonato Baiano: 2005, 2007

Cruzeiro

- Campeonato Brasileiro Série A: 2014
- Campeonato Mineiro: 2008, 2014

Shakhtar Donetsk

- Ukrainian Premier League: 2010–11
- UEFA Cup: 2008–09

Werder Bremen

- DFL-Supercup: 2009

Flamengo

- Copa do Brasil: 2013

Individual

- Copa Libertadores de América top scorer: 2008
- China League One top goalscorer: 2017

== See also ==
- List of men's footballers with 100 or more international caps
