= Renan (footballer, born 1997) =

Brazilian footballer (born 1997)

- Renan with América de Natal in 2025

Personal information
- Full name: Renan Silva Bragança
- Date of birth: 14 November 1997 (age 28)
- Place of birth: Porto Alegre, Brazil
- Height: 1.86 m (6 ft 1 in)
- Position: Goalkeeper

Team information
- Current team: Inter de Lameira (on loan from América de Natal)

Youth career
- 2014–2017: Grêmio

Senior career*
Years	Team	Apps	(Gls)
2016–2017	Grêmio	0	(0)
2018	ASA	1	(0)
2018	Cruzeiro-RS	0	(0)
2019–2020	Pelotas	0	(0)
2020–2021	Azuriz	25	(1)
2021–2023	Mafra	27	(0)
2023–	América de Natal	86	(0)
2024	→ Náutico (loan)	2	(0)
2026	→ Inter de Limeira (loan)	2	(0)
- * Club domestic league appearances and goals as of 22:32, 5 November 2026 (UTC)

Renan Silva Bragança (born 14 November 1997), known as Renan, is a Brazilian professional footballer who plays as a goalkeeper for Inter de Limeira, on loan from América de Natal.

== Career ==
Born in Porto Alegre, Renan was a youth player at hometown club Grêmio, and was also known by the nickname Dida early in his career. For 2018, he moved to ASA, where he compted for a starting position with Valdemar Pereira Júnior, who had the same nickname. He played one match in the Campeonato Alagoano, and spent the second half of the year back in Rio Grande do Sul, with Cruzeiro-RS.

Renan moved back north for 2019, signing for ABC, and then went back to his home state and joined Pelotas. In 2020, he signed for Azuriz, where he was first-choice as they won the Campeonato Paranaense Second Division; he scored from 90 metres in a 4–0 win over Araucária.

In July 2021, Renan moved abroad for the first time in his career, signing a two-year deal with Mafra in Liga Portugal 2. Manager Ricardo Sousa preferred Miguel Santos in the league season, and Renan for the Taça de Portugal; the cup campaign resulted in the Lisbon District club reaching the semi-finals. In 2022–23, loanee Samu played the majority of games.

Renan went back to Brazil in June 2023, signing for América de Natal in the Campeonato Brasileiro Série C. In August 2024, following his club's elimination from the Campeonato Brasileiro Série D playoffs, he was loaned to Náutico in Série C, to cover a goalkeeping emergency. Having won the Campeonato Potiguar three consecutive times, he extended his contract in June 2026, to the end of 2029. On 1 September 2026, he was loaned to Inter de Limeira for the rest of the Série C campaign, after injury to Saulo.

== Honours ==
Azuriz

- Campeonato Paranaense Second Division: 2020

América de Natal

- Campeonato Potiguar: 2024, 2025, 2026
