= Samu (footballer, born 1999) =

Portuguese footballer (born 1999)

Personal information
- Full name: Samuel António Ferreira da Silva
- Date of birth: 12 May 1999 (age 27)
- Place of birth: Paris, France
- Height: 1.93 m (6 ft 4 in)
- Position: Goalkeeper

Team information
- Current team: Maccabi Netanya
- Number: 22

Youth career
- 2007–2011: Abambres
- 2011–2018: Mondinense

Senior career*
Years	Team	Apps	(Gls)
2016–2018	Mondinense	3	(0)
2018–2020	Chaves B	19	(0)
2020–2023	Chaves	5	(0)
2021–2022	→ Pedras Salgadas (loan)	15	(0)
2022–2023	→ Mafra (loan)	19	(0)
2023–2026	Marítimo	51	(0)
2026–	Maccabi Netanya	9	(0)
- * Club domestic league appearances and goals as of 14:27, 5 November 2026 (UTC)

Samuel António Ferreira da Silva (born 12 May 1999), known as Samu, is a Portuguese professional footballer who plays as a goalkeeper for Israeli club Maccabi Netanya.

== Career ==
Samu was born in Paris to Portuguese parents and raised in Portugal. He began playing as a youth for Abambres and Mondinense, before joining Chaves in 2018. He made his Liga Portugal 2 debut on 21 May 2021 on the final day of the season, a 3–1 loss away to Arouca. He then had loans to Pedras Salgadas and Mafra, playing 19 second-tier games with the latter in 2022–23 while competing against Brazilian Renan for the starting place.

On 4 July 2023, Samu signed a three-year deal with Marítimo, in the same league. He remained a back-up goalkeeper until 10 August 2025, in the first game of the new season, when Gonçalo Tabuaço was sent off and manager Vítor Matos put Samu on for the final 15 minutes; he then became first-choice. He was voted the league's Goalkeeper of the Month seven times that season, as well as Goalkeeper of the Year, kept 14 clean sheets in 33 games, and conceded a record low 28 goals as his team won promotion as champions. His contract expired in July 2026, and he was released.

After Marítimo's promotion, Samu was a target for Primeira Liga club Vitória de Guimarães. However, on 7 July 2026, he signed a two-year deal with Maccabi Netanya in the Israeli Premier League.
