= Klebinho =

Brazilian footballer

Personal information
- Full name: Kléber Augusto Caetano Leite Filho
- Date of birth: 2 August 1998 (age 28)
- Place of birth: Rio de Janeiro, Brazil
- Height: 1.64 m (5 ft 4 1/2 in)
- Position: Right-back

Team information
- Current team: Inter d'Escaldes
- Number: 31

Youth career
- 2014–2018: Flamengo

Senior career*
Years	Team	Apps	(Gls)
2017–2021	Flamengo	6	(0)
2019–2020	→ Tokyo Verdy (loan)	31	(0)
2021	→ Cruzeiro (loan)	0	(0)
2021–2024	Guayaquil City	63	(5)
2024–2025	Oliveirense	23	(0)
2026–	Inter d'Escaldes	0	(0)

International career^{‡}
2013	Brazil U16	1	(0)
2014–2015	Brazil U17	15	(1)
- * Club domestic league appearances and goals as of 5 June 2026 ‡ National team caps and goals as of 21:52, 10 February 2024 (UTC)

Kléber Augusto Caetano Leite Filho (born 2 August 1998), commonly known as Klebinho, is a Brazilian professional footballer who plays as a right-back for Andorran club Inter d'Escaldes.

== Career ==
=== Guayaquil City ===
On 27 July 2021 Klebinho terminated his contract with Flamengo and signed with Ecuadorian club Guayaquil City. In this negotiation, Flamengo kept 20% of his economic rights

=== Oliveirense ===
On 31 January 2024, Klebinho left Guayaquil and joined Liga Portugal 2 club Oliveirense.

== Career statistics ==
=== Club ===
As of 8 August 2021

Appearances and goals by club, season and competition
Club	Season	League			Cup		Continental		Other		Total	
Club	Season	Division	Apps	Goals	Apps	Goals	Apps	Goals	Apps	Goals	Apps	Goals
Flamengo	2017	Série A	0	0	0	0	–		1 (Note: Appearances in the Primeira Liga.)	0	1	0
Flamengo	2018	Série A	0	0	0	0	0	0	4 (Note: Appearances in the Campeonato Carioca.)	0	4	0
Flamengo	2019	Série A	0	0	0	0	0	0	2	0	2	0
Flamengo	Total		0	0	0	0	0	0	7	0	7	0
Tokyo Verdy (loan)	2019	J2 League	13	0	0	0	–		–		13	0
Tokyo Verdy (loan)	2020	J2 League	18	0	0	0	–		–		18	0
Tokyo Verdy (loan)	Total		31	0	0	0	0	0	0	0	31	0
Cruzeiro (loan)	2021	Série B	0	0	1	0	–		–		1	0
Guayaquil City	2021	Serie A	2	0	0	0	–		–		2	0
Career total			33	0	1	0	0	0	7	0	41	0

== Honours ==
Flamengo

- Campeonato Carioca: 2019
