= Weverton (footballer, born 2003) =

Brazilian footballer (born 2003)

Personal information
- Full name: Weverton Silva de Andrade
- Date of birth: 17 February 2003 (age 23)
- Place of birth: Matrinchã, Goiás, Brazil
- Height: 1.83 m (6 ft 0 in)
- Position: Centre-back

Team information
- Current team: Kyoto Sanga (on loan from Cruzeiro)
- Number: 4

Youth career
- –2021: Cruzeiro

Senior career*
Years	Team	Apps	(Gls)
2021–	Cruzeiro	13	(0)
2024	→ Athletic-MG (loan)	0	(0)
2025	→ Betim (loan)	9	(0)
2025	→ Vila Nova (loan)	24	(1)
2026	→ Ponte Preta (loan)	3	(0)
2026–	→ Kyoto Sanga (loan)	6	(0)

International career
2019	Brazil U16	6	(0)
- Brazil U17
2023	Brazil U20	1	(0)
Medal record
Men's football
Representing Brazil
South American U-20 Championship
Winner	2023 Colombia
- * Club domestic league appearances and goals as of 21:18, 19 October 2026 (UTC)

Weverton Silva de Andrade (born 17 February 2003), simply known as Weverton, is a Brazilian professional footballer who plays as a central defender for J1 League club Kyoto Sanga, on loan from Cruzeiro.

== Career statistics ==
=== Club ===
As of 19 October 2026.

Appearances and goals by club, season and competition
Club	Season	League			State League		National cup (Note: Includes Copa do Brasil, Emperor's Cup)		Continental		Other		Total	
Club	Season	Division	Apps	Goals	Apps	Goals	Apps	Goals	Apps	Goals	Apps	Goals	Apps	Goals
Cruzeiro	2021	Série B	3	0	7 (Note: Appearances in Campeonato Mineiro)	0	3	0	0	0	–		13	0
Cruzeiro	2022	Série B	0	0	2	0	0	0	0	0	–		2	0
Cruzeiro	2024	Série A	1	0	0	0	0	0	0	0	–		1	0
Cruzeiro	Total		4	0	9	0	3	0	0	0	0	0	16	0
Athletic-MG (loan)	2024	Série C	0	0	0	0	0	0	–		1 (Note: Appearance in Troféu Inconfidência)	0	1	0
Betim (loan)	2025	–			9	0	–		–		–		9	0
Vila Nova (loan)	2025	Série B	19	1	0	0	0	0	–		–		19	1
Vila Nova (loan)	2026	Série B	0	0	5 (Note: Appearances in Campeonato Goiano)	0	2	0	–		–		7	0
Vila Nova (loan)	Total		19	1	5	0	2	0	0	0	0	0	26	1
Ponte Preta (loan)	2026	Série B	3	0	0	0	–		–		–		3	0
Kyoto Sanga (loan)	2026–27	J1 League	6	0	–		0	0	1 (Note: Appearances in AFC Champions League Elite)	0	–		7	0
Career total			32	1	0	0	5	0	1	0	24	0	62	1
