= Vitor Leque =

Brazilian footballer

Personal information
- Full name: Vitor Benedito Leque da Silva
- Date of birth: 19 January 2001 (age 25)
- Place of birth: Cuiabá, Brazil
- Height: 1.74 m (5 ft 9 in)
- Position: Forward

Team information
- Current team: Inter de Limeira
- Number: 19

Youth career
- 2017–2018: Betis
- 2018: São Luís-GO
- 2019: Internacional
- 2020–2021: Atlético Goianiense
- 2021: → Cruzeiro (loan)

Senior career*
Years	Team	Apps	(Gls)
2020–2021	Atlético Goianiense	13	(2)
2021–2023	Cruzeiro	5	(1)
2022	→ Juventude (loan)	2	(0)
2023	→ Botafogo-SP (loan)	0	(0)
2023	→ Remo (loan)	4	(0)
2024	Joinville	12	(1)
2024	CSA	18	(1)
2025	Botafogo-PB	4	(0)
2025	Grêmio Barueri	4	(0)
2025	Rio Branco	15	(1)
2026–	Inter de Limeira	38	(3)
- * Club domestic league appearances and goals as of 9 November 2026

Vitor Benedito Leque da Silva (born 19 January 2001), known as Vitor Leque, is a Brazilian footballer who plays as forward for Inter de Limeira.

== Club career ==
Born in Cuiabá, Mato Grosso, Vitor Leque joined Atlético Goianiense's youth setup in 2020, after representing Internacional, São Luís-GO and Betis. He made his first team debut on 8 March of that year, coming on as a second-half substitute for Matheus Vargas in a 1–0 Campeonato Goiano away win against Goiânia.

In 2020, Vitor Leque renewed his contract until 2025. He made his Série A debut on 20 January 2021, replacing Wellington Rato and scoring his team's third in a 3–1 away win over Botafogo.

On 23 March 2021, Vitor Leque joined Cruzeiro on loan until the end of the year, initially for the under-20 squad.

== Career statistics ==
As of 13 October 2021

Club	Season	League			State League		Cup		Continental		Other		Total	
Club	Season	Division	Apps	Goals	Apps	Goals	Apps	Goals	Apps	Goals	Apps	Goals	Apps	Goals
Atlético Goianiense	2020	Série A	8	2	5	0	0	0	—		3 (Note: Appearance(s) in Copa Verde)	1	16	3
Cruzeiro (loan)	2021	Série B	5	1	0	0	0	0	—		—		5	1
Career total			13	3	5	0	0	0	0	0	3	1	21	4

== Honours ==
Atlético Goianiense

- Campeonato Goiano: 2020

Cruzeiro

- Campeonato Brasileiro Série B: 2022
