= Claudinho (footballer, born November 2000) =

Brazilian footballer

Personal information
- Full name: Cláudio Henrique Paiva Porfirio
- Date of birth: 18 November 2000 (age 25)
- Place of birth: Lupércio
- Height: 1.67 m (5 ft 6 in)
- Position: Forward

Team information
- Current team: Inter de Limeira
- Number: 10

Youth career
- 2018–2019: Ferroviária

Senior career*
Years	Team	Apps	(Gls)
2019–2020	Ferroviária	8	(0)
2020–2025	Cruzeiro	41	(2)
2022	→ Mirassol (loan)	6	(0)
2022	→ Chapecoense (loan)	20	(0)
2023	→ Santo André (loan)	6	(0)
2023	→ Pouso Alegre (loan)	8	(0)
2024	→ Confiança (loan)	8	(1)
2025	Taubaté	14	(1)
2025–	Inter de Limeira	44	(3)
- * Club domestic league appearances and goals as of 9 November 2026

Cláudio Henrique Paiva Porfirio (born 18 November 2000), commonly known as Claudinho, is a Brazilian footballer who plays as a forward for Inter de Limeira.

== Career statistics ==
=== Club ===
As of 18 February 2024.

Club	Season	League			State League		Cup		Continental		Other		Total	
Club	Season	Division	Apps	Goals	Apps	Goals	Apps	Goals	Apps	Goals	Apps	Goals	Apps	Goals
Ferroviária	2019	Série D	0	0	—		—		—		1 (Note: Appearances in the Copa Paulista)	0	1	0
Ferroviária	2020	Série D	0	0	8 (Note: Appearances in the Campeonato Paulista)	0	3 (Note: Appearances in the Copa do Brasil)	2	—		—		11	2
Ferroviária	Total		0	0	8	0	3	2	—		1	0	12	2
Cruzeiro	2020	Série B	11	0	3 (Note: Appearances in the Campeonato Mineiro)	0	0	0	—		—		14	0
Cruzeiro	2021	Série B	20	2	7	0	1	0	—		—		28	2
Cruzeiro	Total		31	2	10	0	1	0	—		—		42	2
Mirassol (loan)	2022	Série C	0	0	6	0	1	0	—		—		7	0
Chapecoense (loan)	2022	Série B	20	0	—		—		—		—		20	0
Santo André (loan)	2023	Série D	0	0	6	0	—		—		—		6	0
Pouso Alegre (loan)	2023	Série C	8	0	—		—		—		—		8	0
Confiança (loan)	2024	Série C	0	0	4 (Note: Appearances in the Campeonato Sergipano)	0	0	0	—		1 (Note: Appearances in the Copa do Nordeste)	0	5	0
Career total			59	2	34	0	5	2	0	0	2	0	100	4
