= João Victor (footballer, born 2002) =

Brazilian footballer

Personal information
- Full name: João Victor da Silva Oliveira
- Date of birth: 6 April 2002 (age 24)
- Place of birth: Campinas, Brazil
- Position: Left back

Team information
- Current team: Capivariano

Youth career
- –2018: Amparo
- 2018–2020: Athletico Paranaense

Senior career*
Years	Team	Apps	(Gls)
2020–2021	Athletico Paranaense	5	(0)
2022–	Red Bull Bragantino II	13	(1)
2023	→ Azuriz (loan)	3	(0)
2024–	Capivariano	0	(0)
- * Club domestic league appearances and goals as of 22 January 2023

João Victor da Silva Oliveira (born 6 April 2002), commonly known as João Victor, is a Brazilian footballer who plays as a left back for Azuriz.

== Career statistics ==
=== Club ===
As of 29 March 2021.

Club	Season	League			State League		Cup		Continental		Other		Total	
Club	Season	Division	Apps	Goals	Apps	Goals	Apps	Goals	Apps	Goals	Apps	Goals	Apps	Goals
Athletico Paranaense	2020	Série A	3	0	0	0	0	0	1 (Note: Appearance(s) in Copa Libertadores)	0	0	0	4	0
Athletico Paranaense	2021	Série A	0	0	0	0	0	0	0	0	—		0	0
Career total			3	0	0	0	0	0	1	0	0	0	4	0
