= Léo (footballer, born 1994) =

Brazilian footballer

Personal information
- Full name: Leonardo Luiz dos Santos
- Date of birth: 3 June 1994 (age 32)
- Place of birth: Itu, Brazil
- Height: 1.97 m (6 ft 5 1/2 in)
- Position: Centre back

Team information
- Current team: Lampang
- Number: 94

Youth career
- 2011: Ituano

Senior career*
Years	Team	Apps	(Gls)
2012–2022	Ituano	20	(1)
2018	→ Ponte Preta (loan)	16	(2)
2023	Nongbua Pitchaya	14	(0)
2023–	Lampang	33	(2)
- * Club domestic league appearances and goals as of 15 March 2023

Leonardo Luiz dos Santos (born 3 June 1994), simply known as Léo, is a Brazilian footballer who plays for Lampang of the Thai League 2 as a centre back.

== Career statistics ==
As of 15 March 2019

Club	Season	League			State League		Cup		Continental		Other		Total	
Club	Season	Division	Apps	Goals	Apps	Goals	Apps	Goals	Apps	Goals	Apps	Goals	Apps	Goals
Ituano	2012	Paulista	—		0	0	—		—		13 (Note: All appearance(s) in Copa Paulista)	0	13	0
Ituano	2013	Paulista	—		0	0	—		—		4	0	4	0
Ituano	2014	Série D	7	0	—		—		—		—		7	0
Ituano	2015	Paulista	—		15	1	7	0	—		10	4	32	5
Ituano	2016	Série D	7	0	8	2	—		—		5	0	20	2
Ituano	2017	Série D	6	1	2	0	—		—		—		11	1
Ituano	2018	Paulista	—		15	1	1	0	—		—		16	1
Ituano	2019	Série D	—		10	2	—		—		—		10	2
Ituano	Subtotal		20	1	50	6	8	0	—		32	4	32	4
Ponte Preta	2018	Série B	16	2	—		—		—		—		16	2
Career total			36	3	50	6	8	0	0	0	32	4	48	6
