= Felipe Augusto (footballer, born 1992) =

Brazilian footballer

Personal information
- Full name: Felipe Augusto Ferreira Batista
- Date of birth: March 6, 1992 (age 34)
- Place of birth: Governador Valadares, Brazil
- Height: 1.83 m (6 ft 0 in)
- Position: Winger

Team information
- Current team: Juventus-SP
- Number: 11

Youth career
- 2011: Atlético Mineiro

Senior career*
Years	Team	Apps	(Gls)
2012	Lemense	8	(2)
2013	Sertãozinho	0	(0)
2014	Democrata	1	(1)
2014	Madureira	18	(4)
2015	Linense	5	(0)
2015	Tupi	21	(1)
2015-2017	→ Estoril (loan)	17	(2)
2017	Villa Nova	11	(2)
2017	Volta Redonda	7	(2)
2017–2018	Paraná	10	(1)
2018	→ Botafogo SP (loan)	21	(9)
2019	Mirassol	14	(0)
2019	→ Operário (loan)	34	(8)
2020	América Mineiro	35	(3)
2021	Cruzeiro	41	(4)
2022	CSA	22	(0)
2023–2024	Operário	69	(16)
2025	Retrô	8	(0)
2025–2026	Figueirense	29	(8)
2026	Operário	14	(0)
2026-	Juventus-SP	0	(0)
- * Club domestic league appearances and goals as of 29 July 2026

Felipe Augusto Ferreira Batista (born 6 March 1992) is a Brazilian professional footballer who plays for Juventus-SP.

== Early career ==
Born in Governador Valadares, Minas Gerais, Felipe Augusto was formed in the youth academy of Clube Atlético Mineiro, where he was promoted to the professional ranks in 2011. He subsequently had spells in Brazilian lower-division football with Lemense, Sertãozinho, Democrata-GV and Madureira, and Linense and Tupi.

== Estoril Praia ==
On 1 December 2015, Felipe Augusto was loaned to Primeira Liga club G.D. Estoril Praia. He made his debut on 10 January 2016 in a home win against Belenenses, and scored his first goal for the Canarinhos when he came off the bench against Vitória S.C. to score the equalizer.

== Return to Brazil ==
Felipe Augusto returned to Brazilian football in 2017, playing for Villa Nova-MG, Volta Redonda and Paraná Clube over the course of the year. While under contract to Paraná, he was loaned to Botafogo-SP for the 2018 Série C, where he scored nine goals in 21 appearances as the club secured promotion to the Série B.

== Mirassol and first spell at Operário Ferroviário ==
In 2019, Felipe Augusto signed for Mirassol, who loaned him to Operário for the Série B campaign. He was one of the standout players of Operário's season, scoring eight goals in 34 appearances.

== América Mineiro and Cruzeiro ==
Felipe Augusto joined América Mineiro for the 2020 season at the request of manager Felipe Conceição, and was a first-team regular as the club won promotion to the Série A. On 13 February 2021, he signed for Cruzeiro on a contract until the end of the year, becoming the club's fourth signing of the 2021 pre-season.

== CSA and second spell at Operário Ferroviário ==
Felipe Augusto signed for CSA for the 2022 season, before returning to Operário Ferroviário for a second spell in 2023. He was the club's top scorer that season with 13 goals as Operário won promotion from the Série C to the Série B under manager Rafael Guanaes, before remaining at the club through the 2024 season.

== Retrô, Figueirense and third spell at Operário Ferroviário ==
Felipe Augusto signed for Pernambuco club Retrô at the start of 2025 to play in the Campeonato Pernambucano, Copa do Brasil and Série C. He left the club in February 2025 to sign for Figueirense on a contract until the end of 2026, going on to become the club's top scorer in the 2025 Série C season.

In February 2026, Felipe Augusto returned to Operário Ferroviário for a third spell, signing a contract until the 2027 Campeonato Paranaense. By the time of his return, he had scored 24 goals in 108 appearances for the club across his two previous spells.

On 24 July 2026, Operário Ferroviário announced that Felipe Augusto's contract had been terminated by mutual agreement. He left as the fourth-highest goalscorer for the club in the 21st century, having become, across his three spells at Operário, one of the squad's most identifiable players with the supporters.

== Juventus-SP ==
Following his departure from Operário Ferroviário, Felipe Augusto agreed to join Juventus-SP, which had recently been promoted to the top flight of the Campeonato Paulista and was also competing in the Copa Paulista.

== Career statistics ==
As of match played 22 September 2026

Appearances and goals by club, season and competition
Club	Season	League			State League		Cup		Continental		Other		Total	
Club	Season	Division	Apps	Goals	Apps	Goals	Apps	Goals	Apps	Goals	Apps	Goals	Apps	Goals
Lemense	2012	Segunda Divisão	—		8	2	—		—		—		8	2
Sertãozinho	2013	Série A3	—		—		—		—		12 (Note: Appearance(s) in Copa Paulista)	2	12	2
Democrata-GV	2014	Mineiro Módulo II	—		1	1	—		—		—		1	1
Madureira	2014	Série C	18	4	—		—		—		7 (Note: Appearance(s) in Copa Rio)	0	25	4
Linense	2015	Campeonato Paulista	—		5	0	—		—		—		5	0
Tupi-MG	2015	Série C	21	1	—		3	0	—		—		24	1
Estoril Praia(loan)	2015–2016	Primeira Liga	9	2	—		1	0	—		—		10	2
Estoril Praia(loan)	2016–2017	Primeira Liga	8	0	—		3	0	—		—		11	0
Estoril Praia(loan)	Total		17	2	0	0	4	0	—		—		21	2
Villa Nova-MG	2017	Campeonato Mineiro	—		11	2	—		—		—		11	2
Volta Redonda	2017	Série C	7	2	—		—		—		—		7	2
Paraná	2017	Série B	4	0	—		—		—		—		4	0
Paraná	2018	Série A	—		6	1	1	0	—		—		7	1
Paraná	Total		4	0	6	1	1	0	—		—		11	1
Botafogo-SP (loan)	2018	Série C	21	9	—		—		—		—		21	9
Paraná	2018	Série A	5	0	—		—		—		—		5	0
Mirassol	2019	Campeonato Paulista	—		14	0	—		—		—		14	0
Operário Ferroviário (loan)	2019	Série B	34	8	—		—		—		—		34	8
América Mineiro	2020	Série B	23	1	12	2	5	1	—		—		40	4
Cruzeiro	2021	Série B	30	3	11	1	4	1	—		—		45	5
CSA	2022	Série B	12	0	10	0	4	0	—		7 (Note: Appearance(s) in Copa do Nordeste)	0	33	0
Operário Ferroviário	2023	Série C	22	8	12	5	1	0	—		—		35	13
Operário Ferroviário	2024	Série B	21	2	14	1	4	0	—		—		39	3
Operário Ferroviário	Total		43	10	26	6	5	0	—		7	0	74	16
Retrô	2025	Série C	—		8	0	—		—		—		8	0
Figueirense	2025	Série C	19	5	1	0	—		—		9 (Note: Appearance(s) in Copa Santa Catarina)	6	29	12
Figueirense	2026	Série C	—		9	2	—		—		—		9	2
Figueirense	Total		19	5	10	2	—		—		9	6	38	14
Operário Ferroviário	2026	Série B	14	0	—		3	1	—		3 (Note: Appearance(s) in Copa Sul-Sudeste)	0	20	1
Juventus-SP	2026	Série A2	—		—		—		—		6	3	6	3
Career total			268	45	221	17	29	3	—		44	11	463	77
