= Associação Atlética Internacional (Limeira) =

Inter de Limeira
- Full name: Associação Atlética Internacional
- Nickname: Leão da Paulista (Paulista Lions)
- Founded: October 5, 1913; 113 years ago
- Ground: Estádio Major José Levy Sobrinho
- Capacity: 23,475
- Head coach: Dyego Coelho
- League: Campeonato Brasileiro Série C Campeonato Paulista Série A2
- 2025 2025: Série C, 3rd of 64 (promoted); Paulista, 16th of 16 (relegated)
Home colors	Away colors	Third colors

Associação Atlética Internacional, commonly referred to as simply Inter de Limeira, is a Brazilian association football club in Limeira, São Paulo. They currently play in the Série C, the third tier of Brazilian football, as well as in the Campeonato Paulista A2, the second tier São Paulo state football league.

The club's home colours are black and white and the team mascot is a lion.

== History ==
On October 2, 1913, at Teatro da Paz (meaning Peace Theater) members of an amateur football club called Barroquinha decided to professionalise their club, and established a monthly fee to be paid by its members and associates. On October 5, 1913, Associação Atlética Internacional was officially founded. The club was named after a São Paulo city club named Internacional (not to be confused with the still active Internacional of Porto Alegre). According to some fans, the club is named to honor the several immigrant communities in Limeira, like the German, Italian, Japanese, and Portuguese communities.

In 1926, Internacional won its first title, the São Paulo Countryside Cup.

In 1982, the club contested the Campeonato Brasileiro Série A for the first time. Inter de Limeira finished in the 23rd position, ahead of big clubs like Cruzeiro and Atlético Paranaense.

In 1986, Internacional, managed by Pepe, won the Campeonato Paulista. It was the first time that a countryside club won the competition. In the semifinals, Inter de Limeira beat Santos, and in the final, the club defeated Palmeiras.

In 1988, Inter de Limeira won its first national title, the Campeonato Brasileiro Série B. In the final four, the club finished ahead of Náutico of Pernambuco state, Ponte Preta of São Paulo state and Americano of Rio de Janeiro state. The club was promoted to the following year's Campeonato Brasileiro Série A.

In 2025, Inter de Limeira made the semifinals of the Campeonato Brasileiro Série D, clinching promotion to the Campeonato Brasileiro Série C in 2026.

== Current squad ==
=== First-team squad ===
As of 20 August 2026

Note: Flags indicate national team as defined under FIFA eligibility rules; some limited exceptions apply. Players may hold more than one non-FIFA nationality.

No.	Pos.	Nation	Player
1	GK	BRA	Saulo
2	DF	BRA	Yan Silva
4	DF	BRA	Lucas Santos
5	MF	BRA	Ronaldo Henrique
6	DF	BRA	João Victor (on loan from Primavera)
7	FW	BRA	Rafael Oller
8	MF	BRA	Luiz Guilherme
9	FW	BRA	Miguel Bianconi
10	MF	BRA	Claudinho
11	MF	BRA	Gustavo Bochecha
12	GK	BRA	Pedro Nagel
14	DF	BRA	Nassom
16	FW	BRA	Robinho
19	FW	BRA	Vitor Leque
20	MF	BRA	Fabricio Dias (on loan from Guarani)
21	DF	BRA	Gabriel Dias
22	DF	BRA	Juan Tavares

No.	Pos.	Nation	Player
23	GK	BRA	Emerson Junior (on loan from Guarani)
24	GK	BRA	Renan (on loan from América de Natal)
25	MF	BRA	Lucas Buchecha
26	MF	BRA	Marco Antônio
27	MF	BRA	Gabriel Santiago
28	DF	BRA	Cristiano Vidal
29	DF	BRA	Heitor Roca (on loan from Criciúma)
30	DF	BRA	Robson
31	MF	BRA	Emerson Santos
32	FW	BRA	Richard
34	DF	BRA	Léo Paraíso
35	MF	BRA	Romarinho
44	DF	BRA	Alemão (on loan from Náutico)
98	FW	BRA	Felipe Saraiva
99	FW	BRA	Getúlio (on loan from Tombense)
-	DF	BRA	César Morais
-	MF	BRA	Alef

== Honours ==
=== Official tournaments ===
National
Competitions	Titles	Seasons
Campeonato Brasileiro Série B	1	1988
State
Competitions	Titles	Seasons
Campeonato Paulista	1	1986
Campeonato Paulista Série A2	3	1978, 1996, 2004
Campeonato Paulista Série A3	1	1966

=== Others tournaments ===
==== Inter-state ====
- Taça dos Campeões Estaduais Rio-São Paulo (1): 1986

=== Runners-up ===
- Copa Paulista (1): 2017
- Campeonato Paulista Série A2 (2): 1928, 2019
- Campeonato Paulista Série A3 (2): 1962, 2017

=== Youth team ===
- Taça Belo Horizonte de Juniores (1): 1990

== Stadium ==
Inter de Limeira's home stadium is Estádio Major José Levy Sobrinho, also known as Limeirão, inaugurated in 1977, with a maximum capacity of 23,475 people.

== Notable players ==
- (Brazil) Guga
- (Brazil) Kita
- (Brazil) Paulinho

== Notable managers ==
- (Brazil) Nelsinho Baptista
- (Brazil) Pepe
- (Brazil) Valdir Peres
- (Brazil) Elano

== Club colors ==
Internacional's colors are black and white.

== Anthem ==
The club's anthem was composed by Joel Navarini, and it is called "Avante Leão!" (meaning "Go ahead Lion!").

== Nickname ==
The club is nicknamed Leão da Paulista (meaning "Lion of Paulista"). The nickname appeared after a match between Internacional and Comercial-Ribeirão Preto of Ribeirão Preto. Comercial is nicknamed Leão, and after a successful trip when the club remained undefeated, the club was beaten by Inter de Limeira, which then adopted the nickname.

== Mascot ==
Inter de Limeira's mascot is called Leão, meaning lion. He is usually depicted wearing the club's home or away kit.
