= Matheus Barbosa =

Brazilian footballer

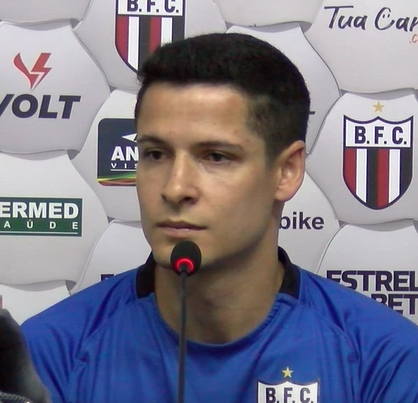
- Matheus Barbosa in 2024

Personal information
- Full name: Matheus Barbosa Teixeira
- Date of birth: 18 August 1994 (age 32)
- Place of birth: São Bernardo do Campo, Brazil
- Height: 1.83 m (6 ft 0 in)
- Position: Centre midfielder

Team information
- Current team: Barra

Youth career
- 2009–2013: Grêmio

Senior career*
Years	Team	Apps	(Gls)
2014–2016	Grêmio	2	(0)
2014	→ ABC (loan)	7	(0)
2014	→ Botafogo-SP (loan)	0	(0)
2015	→ América de Natal (loan)	1	(0)
2016	→ Paulista (loan)	15	(0)
2016–2018	Atlético Tubarão	25	(3)
2018	→ Avaí (loan)	23	(2)
2019–2021	Avaí	32	(1)
2020	→ Água Santa (loan)	0	(0)
2020–2021	→ Cuiabá (loan)	25	(1)
2021	→ Cruzeiro (loan)	23	(6)
2021	→ Atlético Goianiense (loan)	11	(1)
2022–2023	Vasco da Gama	22	(0)
2023	Guarani	38	(4)
2024–2025	Botafogo-SP	39	(2)
2026–	Barra	11	(1)

International career
2011	Brazil U17	14	(3)
- * Club domestic league appearances and goals as of 11 November 2026

Matheus Barbosa Teixeira (born 18 August 1994), known as Matheus Barbosa, is a Brazilian footballer who plays as a centre midfielder for Barra.

== Club career ==
Born in São Bernardo do Campo, Barbosa is a graduate of the youth academy of Grêmio and made his professional debut in the 2014 Campeonato Gaúcho, playing two times in the competition. On 2 February, he was loaned out to ABC for the 2014 Campeonato Potiguar. He went on to make seven appearances for the side and returned to his parent club in May. After a short stint with Botafogo SP, Barbosa was loaned out to América RN on 5 May 2015 for the remainder of the season.

In 2016, Barbosa signed with Atlético Tubarão and went on to make 17 appearances with the club in the second tier of Campeonato Catarinense. On 23 March 2018, he joined Avaí on a loan deal. Following the side's promotion to Série A, his contract was renewed for one year in December.

== International career ==
Barbosa has been at the under-17 level and has won the 2011 Copa Sudamericano Under-17 with the side.

== Club statistics ==
As of 13 October 2021

Club	Season	League			State League		Cup		Continental		Other		Total	
Club	Season	Division	Apps	Goals	Apps	Goals	Apps	Goals	Apps	Goals	Apps	Goals	Apps	Goals
Grêmio	2014	Série A	0	0	2	0	0	0	—		—		2	0
ABC (loan)	2014	Série B	0	0	7	0	0	0	—		—		7	0
Botafogo SP (loan)	2014	Série C	0	0	—		—		—		7 (Note: Appearance(s) in Copa Paulista)	0	7	0
América de Natal (loan)	2015	Série C	1	0	0	0	0	0	—		—		1	0
Paulista (loan)	2016	Paulista A2	—		15	0	—		—		—		15	0
Tubarão	2016	Catarinense Divisão Especial	—		17	1	—		—		—		17	1
Tubarão	2017	Catarinense	—		2	0	—		—		—		2	0
Tubarão	2018	Catarinense	—		6	2	1	1	—		—		7	3
Tubarão	Total		—		25	3	1	1	—		—		26	3
Avaí	2018	Série B	23	2	—		—		—		—		23	2
Avaí	2019	Série A	18	0	14	1	4	0	—		—		36	1
Avaí	Total		41	2	14	1	4	0	—		—		59	3
Água Santa (loan)	2020	Paulista	—		0	0	—		—		—		0	0
Cuiabá (loan)	2020	Série B	25	1	—		4	1	—		1 (Note: Appearance(s) in Copa Verde)	0	30	2
Cruzeiro (loan)	2021	Série B	10	4	13	2	4	1	—		—		27	7
Atlético Goianiense (loan)	2021	Série A	8	1	—		—		—		—		8	1
Career total			85	8	76	6	9	2	0	0	8	0	178	16

== Honours ==
Avaí

- Campeonato Catarinense: 2019
