= Eduardo Brock =

Brazilian footballer (born 1991)

Personal information
- Full name: Eduardo Schroder Brock
- Date of birth: 6 May 1991 (age 35)
- Place of birth: Arroio do Meio, Brazil
- Height: 1.86 m (6 ft 1 in)
- Position: Defender

Team information
- Current team: Novorizontino
- Number: 14

Youth career
- 2007–2011: Grêmio

Senior career*
Years	Team	Apps	(Gls)
2012	Canoas	2	(0)
2012	Novo Hamburgo	7	(0)
2013	Juventude	5	(0)
2014	Aimoré	9	(0)
2014–2016	Brasil de Pelotas	38	(2)
2017	Paraná	57	(2)
2018	Goiás	27	(2)
2018	→ Ceará (loan)	8	(0)
2019–2021	Ceará	37	(2)
2021–2023	Cruzeiro	79	(5)
2023–2024	Cerro Porteño	39	(0)
2025	Avaí	51	(2)
2026–	Novorizontino	18	(2)
- * Club domestic league appearances and goals as of 17 November 2026

Eduardo Schroder Brock (born 6 May 1991) is a Brazilian professional footballer who plays as a defender for Novorizontino.

== Career ==
On 27 November 2017, Brock joined Campeonato Brasileiro Série B side Goiás from Paraná on a two-year deal.

== Honours ==
Goiás

- Campeonato Goiano: 2018

Ceará

- Copa do Nordeste: 2020

Cruzeiro

- Campeonato Brasileiro Série B: 2022

Avaí

- Campeonato Catarinense: 2025

Novorizontino

- Campeonato Brasileiro Série B: 2026
