= Bruno José =

Brazilian footballer (born 1998)

Personal information
- Full name: Bruno José de Souza
- Date of birth: 31 March 1998 (age 28)
- Place of birth: Monte Sião, Brazil
- Height: 1.73 m (5 ft 8 in)
- Position: Forward

Team information
- Current team: Atlético Goianiense

Youth career
- 2017–2018: Internacional

Senior career*
Years	Team	Apps	(Gls)
2019–2021	Internacional	2	(0)
2019	→ Botafogo-SP	24	(2)
2020	→ CSA	9	(0)
2020–2021	→ Brasil de Pelotas (loan)	22	(6)
2021–2023	Cruzeiro	54	(4)
2022–2023	→ Guarani (loan)	68	(7)
2024–2026	Júbilo Iwata	21	(0)
2025	→ Novorizontino (loan)	40	(2)
2026–	Atlético Goianiense	6	(0)
- * Club domestic league appearances and goals as of 16 April 2026

Bruno José de Souza, commonly known as Bruno José, is a Brazilian professional footballer who plays as a forward for Atlético Goianiense.

== Career ==
Trained in the youth ranks of Internacional, Bruno José turned professional at the start of 2019 and, after making two appearances for the senior team in Campeonato Gaúcho, was loaned to Botafogo-SP at the end of February 2019 for the rest of the year. He made his national league debut in the first match of 2019 Campeonato Brasileiro Série B on 27 April 2019, a 3–1 victory against Vitória.

== Career statistics ==
=== Club ===
As of 7 August 2024

Appearances and goals by club, season and competition
Club	Season	League			State league		National Cup		Other		Total	
Club	Season	Division	Apps	Goals	Apps	Goals	Apps	Goals	Apps	Goals	Apps	Goals
Internacional	2019	Série A	—		2 (Note: Appearance(s) in Campeonato Gaúcho)	0	—		—		2	0
Botafogo SP (loan)	2019	Série B	18	2	6 (Note: Appearance(s) in Campeonato Paulista Série A1)	1	—		—		24	3
CSA (loan)	2020	Série B	—		3 (Note: Appearance(s) in Campeonato Alagoano)	0	1	0	5 (Note: Appearance(s) in Copa do Nordeste)	0	9	0
Brasil de Pelotas (loan)	2020	Série B	22	6	—		—		—		22	6
Cruzeiro	2021	Série B	30	2	11	0	4	1	—		45	3
Cruzeiro	2022	Série B	—		8	1	1	0	—		9	1
Cruzeiro	Total		30	2	19	1	5	1	—		54	4
Guarani (loan)	2022	Série B	35	2	—		—		—		35	2
Guarani (loan)	2023	Série B	32	4	9	1	—		—		41	5
Guarani (loan)	Total		67	6	9	1	—		—		76	7
Júbilo Iwata	2024	J1 League	18	0	1	1	—		1 (Note: Appearance(s) in J.League Cup)	0	20	1
Career Total			155	16	40	4	6	1	6	0	207	21
