= Arena do Jacaré =

Football stadium in Sete Lagoas

- Arena do Jacaré (Caiman's Arena), Nogueirão
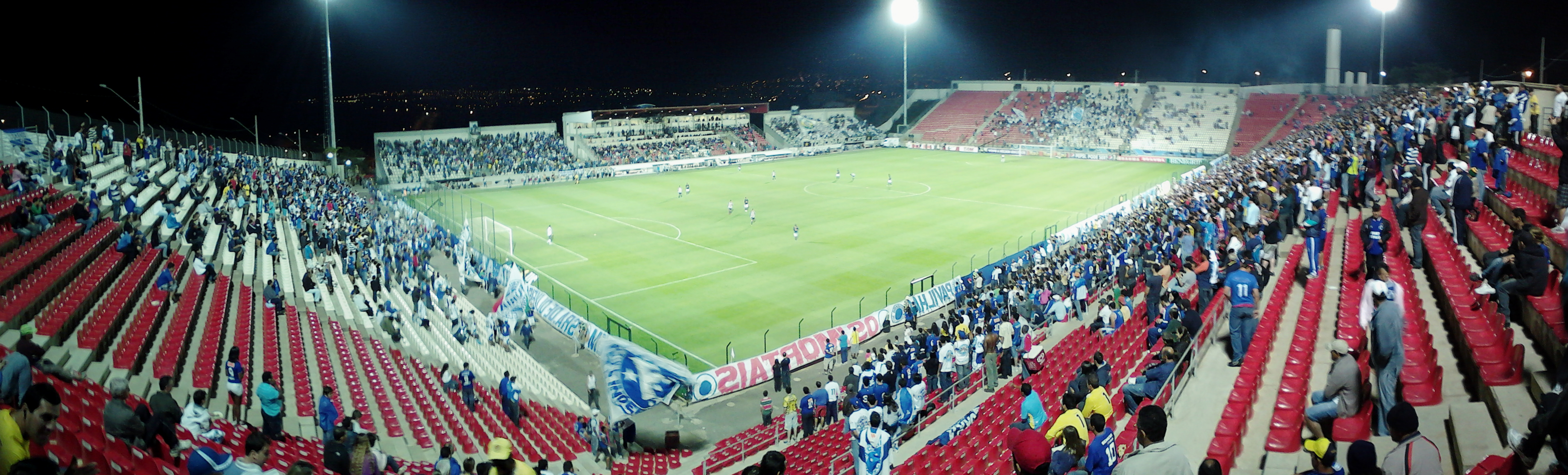
- Sisbrace
- Interactive map of Arena do Jacaré
- Full name: Estádio Joaquim Henrique Nogueira
- Location: Sete Lagoas, Brazil
- Coordinates: 19°28′43.66″S 44°13′19.28″W
- Owner: Democrata-SL
- Capacity: 20,000
- Surface: Grass
- Record attendance: 20,500
- Field size: 110 x 75 m

Construction
- Built: 2006
- Opened: January 28, 2006
- Renovated: 2010

Tenants
- Democrata-SL; América (MG) (2010–2011); Atlético Mineiro (2010–2011); Cruzeiro (2010–2011)

The Estádio Joaquim Henrique Nogueira, or Nogueirão, also nicknamed Arena do Jacaré (Caiman's Arena), is a football stadium located in Sete Lagoas, Minas Gerais state, it seats 20,020 people. The stadium's official name comes from a farmer from a traditional family of the region who gave the land which the stadium was built on, while the nickname comes from the mascot of local team Democrata Futebol Clube, a Caiman.

== History ==
The stadium has 44 bathrooms, six dressing rooms and 19 press booths. Democrata-SL used to host their games at Estádio José Duarte de Paiva, which seated only 2,000 people. The official name comes from Joaquim Henrique Nogueira, a farmer who donated the lands used for construction.

The stadium was inaugurated on January 28, 2006, with a match between Democrata-SL versus Atlético Mineiro, on that occasion Democrata-SL won 3-0, the first goal scored at Arena do Jacaré was Paulo César on the 15th minute.

== Attendance ==
The highest attendance was between Democrata-SL versus Atlético Mineiro, 20,500, for the Campeonato Mineiro 2008, Democrata-SL won 1-0.

== Renovations ==
In 2010, the stadium was renovated to receive matches of Atlético Mineiro and Cruzeiro since Mineirão was chosen to host the 2014 FIFA World Cup and is undergoing reforms. Another team of Belo Horizonte, América Mineiro, is also playing in the stadium as Estádio Independência is being rebuilt. The capacity was raised to 25,000, new seats were installed, and the parking spaces, press booths, and lighting were also improved.

The first game after the renovations was between Atlético Mineiro and Atlético Goianiense which Atlético Mineiro won 3-2. The first goal at the "new" stadium was scored by Diego Tardelli in front of a crowd of 3,179.
