= 2020 Cruzeiro EC season =

Cruzeiro
2020 season
- President: José Dalai Rocha (interim – until 31 May 2020); Sérgio Santos Rodrigues (from 1 June 2020)
- Manager: Adílson Batista (until 15 March 2020); Enderson Moreira (18 March 2020 to 8 September 2020); Ney Franco (9 September 2020 to 11 October 2020); Luiz Felipe Scolari (15 October 2020 to 25 January 2021)
- Stadium: Mineirão
- Série B: 11th
- Campeonato Mineiro: First stage
- Copa do Brasil: Third stage
- Top goalscorer: League: Rafael Sóbis (6); All: Rafael Sóbis (6)
- Highest home attendance: 21,902 vs América Mineiro (Note: All matches from 15 March 2020 were played behind closed doors due to the COVID-19 pandemic in Brazil.) (9 February 2020, Campeonato Mineiro)
- Lowest home attendance: 8,060 vs Villa Nova (28 January 2020, Campeonato Mineiro)
- Average home league attendance: 0 (Note: All league matches were played behind closed doors due to the COVID-19 pandemic in Brazil.)
- Biggest win: 4–1 vs Brasil de Pelotas (5 December 2020, Série B)
- Biggest defeat: 1–3 vs CSA (19 September 2020, Série B)
| Home colors | Away colors | Third colors |

The 2020 season was the 99th in the Cruzeiro Esporte Clube's existence.

Along with the Campeonato Brasileiro Série B – which Cruzeiro played for the first time in their history after being relegated in the 2019 season –, the club also competed in the Campeonato Mineiro and in the Copa do Brasil.

All competitions were suspended between 17 March and 25 July due to the COVID-19 pandemic in Brazil, which led the season to extend until 29 January 2021.

== Players ==
=== Squad information ===
Last updated on 30 January 2021.

| Squad No. | Name | Nationality | Position(s) | Date of birth (age) | Apps | Goals | Signed from |
Goalkeepers
| 1 | Fábio | (Brazil) | GK | 30 September 1980 (aged 40) | 922 | 0 | (Brazil) Vasco da Gama |
| 12 | Lucas França | (Brazil) | GK | 19 January 1996 (aged 25) | 6 | 0 | Youth system |
| 39 | Vitor Eudes | (Brazil) | GK | 21 October 1998 (aged 22) | 2 | 0 | Youth system |
| 40 | Vinícius | (Brazil) | GK | 4 January 2002 (aged 19) | 0 | 0 | Youth system |
Defenders
| 2 | Cáceres | (Paraguay) | RB | 18 September 1991 (aged 29) | 32 | 2 | (Paraguay) Cerro Porteño |
| 3 | Léo (captain) | (Brazil) | CB | 30 January 1988 (aged 33) | 401 | 22 | (Brazil) Palmeiras |
| 4 | Ramon | (Brazil) | CB | 3 May 1995 (aged 25) | 29 | 2 | (Brazil) Vitória |
| 14 | Cacá | (Brazil) | CB | 25 April 1999 (aged 21) | 56 | 3 | Youth system |
| 22 | Patrick Brey | (Brazil) | LB | 5 June 1997 (aged 23) | 23 | 0 | (Brazil) Tupi |
| 26 | Dedé | (Brazil) | CB | 1 July 1988 (aged 32) | 188 | 15 | (Brazil) Vasco da Gama |
| 31 | Giovanni | (Brazil) | LB | 23 June 1989 (aged 31) | 9 | 1 | (Brazil) Bahia |
| 32 | Manoel | (Brazil) | CB | 26 February 1990 (aged 30) | 176 | 12 | (Brazil) Athletico Paranaense |
| 33 | Paulo | (Brazil) | CB | 14 February 2002 (aged 18) | 2 | 0 | Youth system |
| 36 | Matheus Pereira | (Brazil) | LB | 21 December 2000 (aged 20) | 25 | 1 | Youth system |
| 38 | Daniel Guedes | (Brazil) | RB | 2 April 1994 (aged 26) | 7 | 0 | (Brazil) Santos (loan) |
| 50 | Rafael Luiz | (Brazil) | RB/RW | 9 May 2002 (aged 18) | 13 | 0 | (Brazil) Sport (loan) |
Midfielders
| 8 | Henrique | (Brazil) | DM/CM | 16 May 1985 (aged 35) | 524 | 27 | (Brazil) Santos |
| 10 | Régis | (Brazil) | DM/CM | 30 November 1992 (aged 28) | 29 | 3 | (Brazil) Bahia (loan) |
| 15 | Adriano | (Brazil) | DM/CM | 4 November 1999 (aged 21) | 25 | 0 | Youth system |
| 16 | Jadsom | (Brazil) | DM/CM | 20 May 2001 (aged 19) | 42 | 0 | (Brazil) Sport |
| 20 | Marco Antônio | (Brazil) | CM/AM | 15 July 2000 (aged 20) | 7 | 0 | Youth system |
| 25 | Machado | (Brazil) | DM/CM | 20 January 1996 (aged 25) | 37 | 2 | (Brazil) Grêmio (loan) |
| 49 | Claudinho | (Brazil) | CM/AM | 18 November 2000 (aged 20) | 14 | 0 | (Brazil) Ferroviária |
| 88 | Jadson | (Brazil) | DM/CM | 30 August 1993 (aged 27) | 45 | 1 | (Brazil) Fluminense |
| 94 | Giovanni | (Brazil) | CM/AM | 4 April 1994 (aged 26) | 10 | 0 | (Brazil) Coritiba |
Forwards
| 7 | Arthur Caíke | (Brazil) | RW/LW/FW | 15 June 1992 (aged 28) | 25 | 4 | (Saudi Arabia) Al-Shabab (loan) |
| 9 | Marcelo Moreno | (Bolivia) | ST | 18 June 1987 (aged 33) | 125 | 48 | (China) Shijiazhuang Ever Bright |
| 11 | William Pottker | (Brazil) | ST/RW/LW | 22 December 1993 (aged 27) | 14 | 3 | (Brazil) Internacional |
| 18 | Thiago | (Brazil) | ST | 26 June 2001 (aged 19) | 27 | 3 | Youth system |
| 19 | Stênio | (Brazil) | RW/LW | 5 April 2003 (aged 17) | 8 | 0 | Youth system |
| 21 | Welinton | (Brazil) | RW/LW/ST | 30 June 1999 (aged 21) | 32 | 2 | Youth system |
| 23 | Rafael Sóbis | (Brazil) | FW/AM | 17 June 1985 (aged 35) | 132 | 31 | (Brazil) Ceará |
| 47 | Riquelmo | (Brazil) | ST | 19 March 2002 (aged 18) | 3 | 0 | Youth system |
| 59 | Zé Eduardo | (Brazil) | ST | 8 July 1999 (aged 21) | 1 | 0 | Youth system |
| 77 | Airton | (Brazil) | RW/LW/FW | 2 February 1999 (aged 21) | 31 | 4 | (Brazil) Inter de Limeira |
| 99 | Sassá | (Brazil) | FW | 11 January 1994 (aged 27) | 92 | 20 | (Brazil) Botafogo |

== Transfers and loans ==
Last updated on 6 November 2020.

=== Transfers in ===
| Entry date | Position | No. | Player | From club | Fee | Ref. |
|---|---|---|---|---|---|---|
| 20 January 2020 | DF | 6 | (Brazil) João Lucas | (Brazil) Ceará | Free | |
| 27 January 2020 | FW | 37 | (Brazil) Roberson | (Brazil) Bragantino | Free | |
| 16 February 2020 | FW | 9 | (Bolivia) Marcelo Moreno | (China) Shijiazhuang Ever Bright | Free | |
| 4 March 2020 | DF | 4 | (Brazil) Ramon | (Brazil) Vitória | Free | |
| 24 June 2020 | DF | 2 | (Paraguay) Cáceres | (Paraguay) Cerro Porteño | Free | |
| 10 July 2020 | MF | 49 | (Brazil) Claudinho | (Brazil) Ferroviária | R$ 3M | |
| 22 July 2020 | DF | 31 | (Brazil) Giovanni | (Brazil) Bahia | Free | |
| 20 August 2020 | FW | 77 | (Brazil) Airton | (Brazil) Inter de Limeira | Free | |
| 29 October 2020 | MF | 94 | (Brazil) Giovanni | (Brazil) Coritiba | Free | |
| 1 November 2020 | FW | 11 | (Brazil) William Pottker | (Brazil) Internacional | Free | |
| 13 November 2020 | FW | 23 | (Brazil) Rafael Sóbis | (Brazil) Ceará | Free | |

=== Loans in ===
| Start date | End date | Position | No. | Player | From club | Fee | Ref. |
|---|---|---|---|---|---|---|---|
| 23 January 2020 | End of the season | MF | 25 | (Brazil) Machado | (Brazil) Grêmio | None | |
| 27 January 2020 | 4 July 2020 | MF | 7 | (Brazil) Everton Felipe | (Brazil) São Paulo | None | |
| 31 January 2020 | 15 June 2020 | FW | 49 | (Brazil) Jhonata Robert | (Brazil) Grêmio | None | |
| 5 March 2020 | 21 October 2020 | MF | 28 | (Brazil) Jean | (Brazil) Palmeiras | None | |
| 6 March 2020 | 9 October 2020 | DF | 27 | (Brazil) Marllon | (Brazil) Corinthians | None | |
| 16 March 2020 | 27 July 2020 | FW | 7 | (Colombia) Angulo | (Brazil) Palmeiras | None | |
| 17 April 2020 | End of the season | MF | 10 | (Brazil) Régis | (Brazil) Bahia | None | |
| 1 July 2020 | 31 December 2021 | FW | 48 | (Brazil) Guilherme | (Brazil) Ituano | None | |
| 10 August 2020 | End of the season | FW | 7 | (Brazil) Arthur Caíke | (Saudi Arabia) Al-Shabab | None | |
| 10 August 2020 | 31 December 2021 | DF | 38 | (Brazil) Daniel Guedes | (Brazil) Santos | None | |
| 31 August 2020 | End of the season | DF | 50 | (Brazil) Rafael Luiz | (Brazil) Sport | None | |

=== Transfers out ===
| Exit date | Position | No. | Player | To club | Fee | Ref. |
|---|---|---|---|---|---|---|
| 7 January 2020 | DF | 6 | (Brazil) Egídio | (Brazil) Fluminense | Released | |
| 14 January 2020 | DF | 25 | (Brazil) Fabrício Bruno | (Brazil) Red Bull Bragantino | R$ 500k | |
| 15 January 2020 | DF | 28 | (Brazil) Digão | (Brazil) Fluminense | Released | |
| 22 January 2020 | MF | 10 | (Brazil) Thiago Neves | (Brazil) Grêmio | Released | |
| 23 January 2020 | FW | 11 | (Brazil) David | (Brazil) Fortaleza | R$ 1M | |
| 26 January 2020 | DF | 42 | (Brazil) Weverton | (Brazil) Red Bull Bragantino | R$3,8M | |
| 11 February 2020 | MF | 15 | (Brazil) Éderson | (Brazil) Corinthians | R$1,7M | |
| 14 February 2020 | MF | 23 | (Brazil) Rodriguinho | (Brazil) Bahia | Released | |
| 14 February 2020 | GK | 12 | (Brazil) Rafael | (Brazil) Atlético Mineiro | Released | |
| 18 February 2020 | FW | 9 | (Brazil) Fred | (Brazil) Fluminense | Released | |
| 5 June 2020 | DF | 2 | (Brazil) Edílson | (Brazil) Goiás | Released | |
| 5 June 2020 | MF | 19 | (Brazil) Robinho | (Brazil) Grêmio | Released | |
| 5 June 2020 | DF | 34 | (Brazil) Edu | (Brazil) Athletico Paranaense | R$2,5M | |
| 21 August 2020 | DF | 46 | (Brazil) Marcelo Hermes | (Portugal) Marítimo | Released | |
| 11 September 2020 | FW | 17 | (Brazil) Judivan | (Brazil) Botafogo-SP | Released | |
| 19 September 2020 | FW | 22 | (Brazil) Renato Kayzer | (Brazil) Athletico Paranaense | R$3,4M | |
| 5 October 2020 | FW | 29 | (Brazil) Caio | (United Arab Emirates) Al-Sharjah | R$3,4M | |
| 1 November 2020 | MF | 11 | (Brazil) Maurício | (Brazil) Internacional | R$1,2M | |
| 13 November 2020 | FW | 37 | (Brazil) Roberson | (Brazil) Atlético Goianiense | Released | |
| 20 November 2020 | MF | 17 | (Brazil) Marquinhos Gabriel | (Brazil) Vasco da Gama | Released | |

=== Loans out ===
| Start date | End date | Position | No. | Player | To club | Fee | Ref. |
|---|---|---|---|---|---|---|---|
| 19 December 2019 | 23 September 2020 | FW | 59 | (Brazil) Zé Eduardo | (Brazil) Villa Nova | None | |
| 20 December 2019 | 6 October 2020 | MF | 27 | (Brazil) Jadson | (Brazil) Bahia | None | |
| 1 January 2020 | 14 June 2020 | FW | 37 | (Cameroon) Joel | (Portugal) Marítimo | None | |
| 1 January 2020 | End of the season | FW | 22 | (Brazil) Renato Kayzer | (Brazil) Atlético Goianiense | None | |
| 9 January 2020 | 9 September 2020 | FW | 20 | (Brazil) Marquinhos Gabriel | (Brazil) Athletico Paranaense | R$ 302k | |
| 17 January 2020 | End of the season | DF | 15 | (Colombia) Orejuela | (Brazil) Grêmio | € 150k | |
| 19 January 2020 | 30 April 2020 | DF | 15 | (Brazil) Patrick Brey | (Brazil) Ferroviária | None | |
| 20 January 2020 | 14 September 2020 | FW | 99 | (Brazil) Sassá | (Brazil) Coritiba | None | |
| 23 January 2020 | 24 June 2020 | MF | 8 | (Brazil) Henrique | (Brazil) Fluminense | None | |
| 31 January 2020 | 31 July 2020 | DF | 4 | (Brazil) Manoel | (Turkey) Trabzonspor | None | |
| 22 June 2020 | End of the season | DF | 36 | (Brazil) Rafael Santos | (Brazil) Chapecoense | None | |
| 14 September 2020 | 30 April 2021 | DF | 23 | (Brazil) Arthur | (Brazil) América Mineiro | None | |
| 30 September 2020 | 31 January 2021 | DF | 6 | (Brazil) João Lucas | (Brazil) Avaí | None | |
| 15 October 2020 | 28 February 2021 | MF | 5 | (Argentina) Ariel Cabral | (Brazil) Goiás | None | |
| 20 November 2020 | End of the season | FW | 30 | (Brazil) Vinícius Popó | (Brazil) Sport | None | |

== Competitions ==
=== Overview ===
| Competition | First match | Last match | Starting round | Final position | Record | | | | | | | |
| Competition | First match | Last match | Starting round | Final position | Pld | W | D | L | GF | GA | GD | Win % |
|---|---|---|---|---|---|---|---|---|---|---|---|---|
| Campeonato Mineiro | 22 January 2020 | 1 August 2020 | Matchday 1 | First stage | 12 | 7 | 2 | 3 | 19 | 10 | +9 | 58.33 |
| Copa do Brasil | 13 February 2020 | 26 August 2020 | First stage | Third stage | 4 | 0 | 3 | 1 | 4 | 6 | −2 | 0.00 |
| Campeonato Brasileiro Série B | 8 August 2020 | 29 January 2021 | Round 1 | 11th | 38 | 14 | 13 | 11 | 39 | 32 | +7 | 36.84 |
| Total | | | | | 54 | 21 | 18 | 15 | 62 | 48 | +14 | 38.89 |

Source: Competitions

=== Campeonato Mineiro ===
==== First stage ====
| Pos | Team | Pld | W | D | L | GF | GA | GD | Pts | Qualification or relegation |
|---|---|---|---|---|---|---|---|---|---|---|
| 3 | Atlético Mineiro | 11 | 6 | 4 | 1 | 20 | 7 | +13 | 22 | Knockout stage |
| 4 | Caldense | 11 | 6 | 2 | 3 | 18 | 9 | +9 | 20 | Knockout stage |
| 5 | Cruzeiro | 11 | 6 | 2 | 3 | 16 | 10 | +6 | 20 | Troféu Inconfidência |
| 6 | Uberlândia | 11 | 4 | 2 | 5 | 11 | 13 | −2 | 14 | Troféu Inconfidência |
| 7 | Boa Esporte | 11 | 3 | 5 | 3 | 10 | 10 | 0 | 14 | Troféu Inconfidência |

Source: FMF
Rules for classification: 1) Points; 2) Wins; 3) Goal difference; 4) Goals scored; 5) Head-to-head results (only if two teams are tied); 6) Fewest red cards received; 7) Fewest yellow cards received; 8) Draw.

| 22 January 2020 1 | Cruzeiro | 2–0 | Boa Esporte | Belo Horizonte |
| 21:30 UTC−3 | Thiago 18'; Welinton 86' | Report | | Stadium: Mineirão; Attendance: 9,945; Referee: Emerson de Almeida Ferreira |

| 28 January 2020 3 | Cruzeiro | 1–0 | Villa Nova | Belo Horizonte |
| 20:00 UTC−3 | Wellington 82' (o.g.) | Report | | Stadium: Mineirão; Attendance: 8,060; Referee: Felipe Fernandes de Lima |

| 2 February 2020 4 | Tupynambás | 2–4 | Cruzeiro | Juiz de Fora |
| 19:00 UTC−3 | Weldon Grafite 4'; Fabinho Alves 13' | Report | Edílson 66', 77' (pen.); Maurício 81'; Jhonata Robert 88' | Stadium: Mário Heleno; Attendance: 2,954; Referee: Ronei Cândido Alves |

| 9 February 2020 5 | Cruzeiro | 1–1 | América Mineiro | Belo Horizonte |
| 16:00 UTC−3 | Maurício 78' | Report | Ademir 69' | Stadium: Mineirão; Attendance: 21,902; Referee: Wanderson Alves de Souza |

| 16 February 2020 6 | Patrocinense | 1–1 | Cruzeiro | Patrocínio |
| 19:00 UTC−3 | Paulo Renê 45+1' | Report | Maurício 90+4' | Stadium: Pedro Alves do Nascimento; Attendance: 2,736; Referee: Paulo Cesar Zanovelli da Silva |

| 20 February 2020 2 | Tombense | 2–0 | Cruzeiro | Tombos |
| 19:15 UTC−3 | Rubens 35'; Cássio Ortega 64' | Report | | Stadium: Almeidão; Attendance: 2,165; Referee: Igor Júnio Benevenuto de Oliveira |
Note: The match was rescheduled from 25 January to 20 February due to heavy rainstorms in the state of Minas Gerais.

| 1 March 2020 7 | Cruzeiro | 2–1 | Uberlândia | Belo Horizonte |
| 16:00 UTC−3 | Pedro Bicalho 11'; Arthur 88' | Report | Jhulliam 57' | Stadium: Mineirão; Attendance: 12,035; Referee: Marco Aurélio Augusto Fazekas |

| 7 March 2020 8 | Atlético Mineiro | 2–1 | Cruzeiro | Belo Horizonte |
| 19:00 UTC−3 | Igor Rabello 37'; Otero 90+2' | Report | Thiago 66' | Stadium: Mineirão; Attendance: 53,576; Referee: Felipe Fernandes de Lima |

| 15 March 2020 9 | Cruzeiro | 0–1 | Coimbra | Belo Horizonte |
| 16:00 UTC−3 | | Report | Vitor Hugo 84' | Stadium: Independência; Attendance: 0 Referee: Wanderson Alves de Souza |
Note: The match was played behind closed doors due to concerns over the COVID-19 pandemic.

| 26 July 2020 10 | Cruzeiro | 3–0 | URT | Belo Horizonte |
| 11:00 UTC−3 | Cacá 3'; Thiago 11'; Marllon 53' | Report | | Stadium: Mineirão; Attendance: 0 Referee: Paulo Cesar Zanovelli da Silva |
Note: The match was rescheduled from 21 March to 26 July due to the COVID-19 pandemic in Brazil.

| 29 July 2020 11 | Caldense | 0–1 | Cruzeiro | Poços de Caldas |
| 21:30 UTC−3 | | Report | Régis 14' | Stadium: Ronaldão; Attendance: 0 Referee: Ronei Cândido Alves |
Note: The match was rescheduled from 1 April to 29 July due to the COVID-19 pandemic in Brazil.

==== Troféu Inconfidência ====
| 1 August 2020 Semi-final | Cruzeiro | 3–0 | Patrocinense | Belo Horizonte |
| 14:30 UTC−3 | Ramon 56'; Roberson 76'; Maurício 81' | Report | | Stadium: Mineirão; Attendance: 0 Referee: André Luiz Bento |

| 5 August 2020 Final | Cruzeiro | Cancelled | Uberlândia | Belo Horizonte |
| 19:00 UTC−3 | | Report | | Stadium: Mineirão |
Note: The match was cancelled due to the infection of 13 Uberlândia players by COVID-19. In common agreement between the clubs and the federation, Cruzeiro gave up the title and Uberlândia were declared champions of the Troféu Inconfidência.

=== Campeonato Brasileiro Série B ===
On 3 October 2019, the Brazilian Football Confederation announced that the 2020 Campeonato Brasileiro Série B would be played between 2 May and 28 November. However, due to the COVID-19 pandemic in Brazil and the consequent suspension of all football competitions between March and June, the games were rescheduled for dates between 8 August 2020 and 30 January 2021.

On 19 May 2020, according to a FIFA decision, it was announced that Cruzeiro would start the competition with a 6-point penalty due to the non-payment of the club's debt to Al Wahda for the loan from midfielder Denílson in 2016.

==== League table ====
| Pos | Team | Pld | W | D | L | GF | GA | GD | Pts |
|---|---|---|---|---|---|---|---|---|---|
| 9 | Avaí | 38 | 16 | 7 | 15 | 45 | 49 | −4 | 55 |
| 10 | CRB | 38 | 15 | 7 | 16 | 48 | 47 | +1 | 52 |
| 11 | Cruzeiro (Note: Cruzeiro were deducted six points after their denial to pay the fee that was agreed upon with Al Wahda over the loan of Denílson in 2016. Al Wahda decided to take this issue to FIFA and won the case.) | 38 | 14 | 13 | 11 | 39 | 32 | +7 | 49 |
| 12 | Brasil de Pelotas | 38 | 11 | 16 | 11 | 31 | 33 | −2 | 49 |
| 13 | Guarani | 38 | 13 | 9 | 16 | 41 | 48 | −7 | 48 |

Source: CBF
Rules for classification: 1) points; 2) wins; 3) goal difference; 4) goals scored; 5) head-to-head results (only between 2 teams); 6) fewest red cards; 7) fewest yellow cards; 8) draw.

==== Results by round ====
| Round | 1 | 2 | 3 | 4 | 5 | 6 | 7 | 8 | 9 | 10 | 11 | 12 | 13 | 14 | 15 | 16 | 17 | 18 | 19 | 20 | 21 | 22 | 23 | 24 | 25 | 26 | 27 | 28 | 29 | 30 | 31 | 32 | 33 | 34 | 35 | 36 | 37 | 38 |
|---|---|---|---|---|---|---|---|---|---|---|---|---|---|---|---|---|---|---|---|---|---|---|---|---|---|---|---|---|---|---|---|---|---|---|---|---|---|---|
| Ground | H | A | A | H | A | H | A | H | H | A | H | H | A | H | A | H | A | A | H | A | H | H | A | H | A | H | A | A | H | A | A | H | A | H | A | H | H | A |
| Result | W | W | W | L | D | L | L | D | W | L | L | W | L | L | D | D | W | D | W | W | D | D | W | L | W | W | D | W | D | D | L | D | W | L | L | W | D | D |
| Position | 20 | 18 | 9 | 11 | 11 | 14 | 16 | 16 | 13 | 15 | 17 | 15 | 17 | 18 | 19 | 19 | 18 | 18 | 16 | 15 | 15 | 15 | 15 | 16 | 15 | 11 | 11 | 11 | 10 | 10 | 11 | 13 | 11 | 13 | 14 | 13 | 12 | 11 |

Updated to match(es) played on -. Source: Matches
A = Away; H = Home; W = Win; D = Draw; L = Loss

==== Matches ====
| 8 August 2020 1 | Cruzeiro | 2–1 | Botafogo-SP | Belo Horizonte |
| 19:00 UTC−3 | Cacá 62'; Jean 87' | Report | Wellington 85' | Stadium: Mineirão; Attendance: 0 Referee: Alisson Sidnei Furtado |

| 11 August 2020 2 | Guarani | 2–3 | Cruzeiro | Campinas |
| 20:30 UTC−3 | Waguininho 2'; Didi 72' | Report | Régis 6'; Marcelo Moreno 29' (pen.); Léo 74' | Stadium: Brinco de Ouro; Attendance: 0 Referee: Ivan Guimarães Junior |

| 16 August 2020 3 | Figueirense | 0–1 | Cruzeiro | Florianópolis |
| 16:00 UTC−3 | | Report | Maurício 45' | Stadium: Orlando Scarpelli; Attendance: 0 Referee: Eduardo de Aquino Valadão |

| 20 August 2020 4 | Cruzeiro | 0–1 | Chapecoense | Belo Horizonte |
| 21:00 UTC−3 | | Report | Anselmo Ramon 9' | Stadium: Mineirão; Attendance: 0 Referee: Denis da Silva Serafim |

| 23 August 2020 5 | Confiança | 1–1 | Cruzeiro | Aracaju |
| 18:00 UTC−3 | Reis 44' | Report | Cáceres 25' | Stadium: Batistão; Attendance: 0 Referee: Marcelo de Lima Henrique |

| 29 August 2020 6 | Cruzeiro | 1–2 | América Mineiro | Belo Horizonte |
| 19:00 UTC−3 | Arthur Caíke 75' | Report | Eduardo Bauermann 26'; Matheusinho 31' | Stadium: Mineirão; Attendance: 0 Referee: Paulo Cesar Zanovelli |

| 2 September 2020 7 | Brasil de Pelotas | 1–0 | Cruzeiro | Pelotas |
| 21:30 UTC−3 | Gabriel Poveda 67' | Report | | Stadium: Estádio Bento Freitas; Attendance: 0 Referee: Rodrigo Batista Raposo |

| 7 September 2020 8 | Cruzeiro | 1–1 | CRB | Belo Horizonte |
| 20:00 UTC−3 | Marcelo Moreno 36' | Report | Léo Gamalho 84' | Stadium: Mineirão; Attendance: 0 Referee: Héber Roberto Lopes |

| 11 September 2020 9 | Cruzeiro | 1–0 | Vitória | Belo Horizonte |
| 21:30 UTC−3 | Régis 75' | Report | | Stadium: Mineirão; Attendance: 0 Referee: Edina Alves Batista |

| 19 September 2020 10 | CSA | 3–1 | Cruzeiro | Maceió |
| 21:00 UTC−3 | Cleberson 11'; Alan Costa 28'; Pedro Lucas 71' | Report | Matheus Pereira 67' | Stadium: Rei Pelé; Attendance: 0 Referee: Grazianni Maciel Rocha |

| 25 September 2020 11 | Cruzeiro | 0–1 | Avaí | Belo Horizonte |
| 21:30 UTC−3 | | Report | Pedro Castro 78' | Stadium: Mineirão; Attendance: 0 Referee: Alexandre Tavares de Jesus |

| 30 September 2020 12 | Cruzeiro | 3–0 | Ponte Preta | Belo Horizonte |
| 19:15 UTC−3 | Machado 14'; Arthur Caíke 30'; Manoel 78' | Report | | Stadium: Mineirão; Attendance: 0 Referee: Francisco Carlos do Nascimento |

| 3 October 2020 13 | Cuiabá | 1–0 | Cruzeiro | Cuiabá |
| 22:00 UTC−3 | Felipe Marques 90+4' | Report | | Stadium: Arena Pantanal; Attendance: 0 Referee: Jefferson Ferreira de Moraes |

| 8 October 2020 14 | Cruzeiro | 1–2 | Sampaio Corrêa | Belo Horizonte |
| 18:30 UTC−3 | Manoel 40' | Report | Roney 12'; Caio Dantas 58' | Stadium: Mineirão; Attendance: 0 Referee: Gilberto Rodrigues Castro Junior |

| 11 October 2020 15 | Oeste | 0–0 | Cruzeiro | Barueri |
| 16:00 UTC−3 | | Report | | Stadium: Arena Barueri; Attendance: 0 Referee: Alisson Sidnei Furtado |

| 16 October 2020 16 | Cruzeiro | 0–0 | Juventude | Belo Horizonte |
| 21:30 UTC−3 | | Report | | Stadium: Mineirão; Attendance: 0 Referee: Dewson Freitas da Silva |

| 20 October 2020 17 | Operário-PR | 0–1 | Cruzeiro | Ponta Grossa |
| 21:30 UTC−3 | | Report | Arthur Caíke 84' | Stadium: Germano Krüger; Attendance: 0 Referee: Diego Pombo Lopez |

| 25 October 2020 18 | Náutico | 1–1 | Cruzeiro | Recife |
| 16:00 UTC−3 | Vinícius 20' | Report | Airton 85' | Stadium: Aflitos; Attendance: 0 Referee: Leandro Bizzio Marinho |

| 30 October 2020 19 | Cruzeiro | 2–0 | Paraná | Belo Horizonte |
| 21:30 UTC−3 | Marcelo Moreno 1'; Airton 38' | Report | | Stadium: Mineirão; Attendance: 0 Referee: Thiago Luis Scarascati |

| 6 November 2020 20 | Botafogo-SP | 0–1 | Cruzeiro | Ribeirão Preto |
| 19:15 UTC−3 | | Report | Airton 70' | Stadium: Santa Cruz; Attendance: 0 Referee: Pablo Ramon Pinheiro |

| 9 November 2020 21 | Cruzeiro | 3–3 | Guarani | Belo Horizonte |
| 20:00 UTC−3 | Manoel 20'; William Pottker 44'; Welinton 80' | Report | Murilo Rangel 14', 51'; Pablo 38' | Stadium: Mineirão; Attendance: 0 Referee: Pathrice Wallace Maia |

| 20 November 2020 22 | Cruzeiro | 1–1 | Figueirense | Belo Horizonte |
| 21:30 UTC−3 | Airton 36' | Report | Léo Artur 11' | Stadium: Mineirão; Attendance: 0 Referee: Marielson Alves Silva |

| 24 November 2020 23 | Chapecoense | 0–1 | Cruzeiro | Chapecó |
| 21:30 UTC−3 | | Report | Rafael Sóbis 78' | Stadium: Arena Condá; Attendance: 0 Referee: Zandick Alves Junior |

| 27 November 2020 24 | Cruzeiro | 1–2 | Confiança | Belo Horizonte |
| 21:30 UTC−3 | Cáceres 54' | Report | Guilherme Castilho 5'; Renan Gorne 25' (pen.) | Stadium: Mineirão; Attendance: 0 Referee: Andrey da Silva e Silva |

| 2 December 2020 25 | América Mineiro | 1–2 | Cruzeiro | Belo Horizonte |
| 21:30 UTC−3 | Anderson Jesus 60' | Report | Rafael Sóbis 14' (pen.); Manoel 48' | Stadium: Independência; Attendance: 0 Referee: Dewson Fernando Freitas da Silva |

| 5 December 2020 26 | Cruzeiro | 4–1 | Brasil de Pelotas | Belo Horizonte |
| 21:00 UTC−3 | Arthur Caíke 11'; Jarro 13' (o.g.); Rafael Sóbis 45+2' (pen.), 73' | Report | Bruno José 28' | Stadium: Mineirão; Attendance: 0 Referee: José Mendonça da Silva Junior |

| 8 December 2020 27 | CRB | 0–0 | Cruzeiro | Maceió |
| 21:30 UTC−3 | | Report | | Stadium: Rei Pelé; Attendance: 0 Referee: Dyorgines Padovani de Andrade |

| 11 December 2020 28 | Vitória | 0–1 | Cruzeiro | Salvador |
| 21:30 UTC−3 | | Report | Ramon 44' | Stadium: Barradão; Attendance: 0 Referee: Douglas Schwengber da Silva |

| 15 December 2020 29 | Cruzeiro | 1–1 | CSA | Belo Horizonte |
| 21:30 UTC−3 | Rafael Sóbis 57' | Report | Pedro Lucas 26' | Stadium: Independência; Attendance: 0 Referee: Caio Max Augusto Vieira |

| 18 December 2020 30 | Avaí | 1–1 | Cruzeiro | Florianópolis |
| 20:15 UTC−3 | Valdívia 90+4' | Report | Machado 40' | Stadium: Ressacada; Attendance: 0 Referee: Antonio Moraes de Sousa |

| 22 December 2020 31 | Ponte Preta | 2–1 | Cruzeiro | Campinas |
| 21:30 UTC−3 | Luizão 65'; Bruno Rodrigues 70' | Report | Manoel 9' | Stadium: Moisés Lucarelli; Attendance: 0 Referee: Ramon Abatti Abel |

| 29 December 2020 32 | Cruzeiro | 0–0 | Cuiabá | Belo Horizonte |
| 21:30 UTC−3 | | Report | | Stadium: Independência; Attendance: 0 Referee: Thiago Luis Scarascati |

| 8 January 2021 33 | Sampaio Corrêa | 0–1 | Cruzeiro | São Luís |
| 21:30 UTC−3 | | Report | William Pottker 4' | Stadium: Castelão; Attendance: 0 Referee: Paulo Schleich Vollkopf |

| 13 January 2021 34 | Cruzeiro | 0–1 | Oeste | Belo Horizonte |
| 21:30 UTC−3 | | Report | Fábio 40' | Stadium: Independência; Attendance: 0 Referee: Gilberto Rodrigues Castro Junior |

| 16 January 2021 35 | Juventude | 1–0 | Cruzeiro | Caxias do Sul |
| 19:00 UTC−3 | Rafael Grampola 21' (pen.) | Report | | Stadium: Alfredo Jaconi; Attendance: 0 Referee: Paulo Roberto Alves Júnior |

| 20 January 2021 36 | Cruzeiro | 2–1 | Operário-PR | Belo Horizonte |
| 21:30 UTC−3 | Rafael Sóbis 32'; William Pottker 76' | Report | Ricardo Bueno 54' | Stadium: Independência; Attendance: 0 Referee: Marcelo Aparecido de Souza |

| 24 January 2021 37 | Cruzeiro | 0–0 | Náutico | Belo Horizonte |
| 16:00 UTC−3 | | Report | | Stadium: Independência; Attendance: 0 Referee: Flávio Rodrigues de Souza |

| 29 January 2021 38 | Paraná | 0–0 | Cruzeiro | Curitiba |
| 21:30 UTC−3 | | Report | | Stadium: Vila Capanema; Attendance: 0 Referee: Jean Pierre Gonçalves Lima |

=== Copa do Brasil ===
The drawn for the first stage was held on 12 December 2019.

==== First stage ====
| 13 February 2020 Single match | São Raimundo-RR | 2–2 | Cruzeiro | Boa Vista |
| 21:30 UTC−3 | Veracruz 25'; Stanley 65' | Report | Edu 34'; Alexandre Jesus 49' | Stadium: Canarinho; Attendance: 4,715; Referee: Alexandre Vargas Tavares de Jesus |
Note: Cruzeiro advanced to the second stage for being the best CBF ranked team.

==== Second stage ====
| 4 March 2020 Single match | Boa Esporte | 1–1 (4–5 p) | Cruzeiro | Varginha |
| 21:30 UTC−3 | Claudeci 58' | Report | João Lucas 36' | Stadium: Melão; Attendance: 5,554; Referee: Marcelo de Lima Henrique |
| | Penalties |
| | Gindré (penalty scored); Chiquinho Alagoano (penalty scored); Yuri (penalty missed); Jefferson (penalty scored); Carlinhos (penalty scored); Ferreira (penalty missed) | | (penalty scored) Edílson; (penalty scored) Machado; (penalty scored) Everton Felipe; (penalty missed) Marco Antônio; (penalty scored) Léo; (penalty scored) Maurício |

==== Third stage ====
| 11 March 2020 First leg | Cruzeiro | 0–2 | CRB | Belo Horizonte |
| 21:30 UTC−3 | | Report | Léo Gamalho 16', 58' | Stadium: Mineirão; Attendance: 13,118; Referee: Sávio Pereira Sampaio |

| 26 August 2020 Second leg | CRB | 1–1 (3–1 agg.) | Cruzeiro | Maceió |
| 16:00 UTC−3 | Léo Gamalho 54' | Report | Giovanni 45' | Stadium: Rei Pelé; Attendance: 0 Referee: Vinicius Gonçalves Dias Araújo |
Note: The match was rescheduled from 18 March to 26 August due to the COVID-19 pandemic in Brazil.

== Squad statistics ==
=== Appearances ===
Players with no appearances not included in the list.

As of match played 29 January 2021.

| No. | Pos. | Nat. | Name | Série B | | Campeonato Mineiro | | Copa do Brasil | | Total | |
| No. | Pos. | Nat. | Name | Apps | Starts | Apps | Starts | Apps | Starts | Apps | Starts |
|---|---|---|---|---|---|---|---|---|---|---|---|
| 1 | GK | (Brazil) | Fábio | 36 | 36 | 11 | 11 | 4 | 4 | 51 | 51 |
| 2 | DF | (Paraguay) | Cáceres | 29 | 29 | 2 | 2 | 1 | 1 | 32 | 32 |
| 3 | DF | (Brazil) | Léo | 10 | 10 | 8 | 8 | 3 | 3 | 21 | 21 |
| 4 | DF | (Brazil) | Ramon | 27 | 26 | 2 | 2 | 0 | 0 | 29 | 28 |
| 7 | FW | (Brazil) | Arthur Caíke | 25 | 17 | 0 | 0 | 0 | 0 | 25 | 17 |
| 8 | MF | (Brazil) | Henrique | 8 | 7 | 0 | 0 | 0 | 0 | 8 | 7 |
| 9 | FW | (Bolivia) | Marcelo Moreno | 26 | 15 | 4 | 3 | 2 | 2 | 32 | 20 |
| 10 | MF | (Brazil) | Régis | 27 | 18 | 2 | 2 | 0 | 0 | 29 | 20 |
| 11 | FW | (Brazil) | William Pottker | 14 | 14 | 0 | 0 | 0 | 0 | 14 | 14 |
| 12 | GK | (Brazil) | Lucas França (footballer) | 2 | 2 | 0 | 0 | 0 | 0 | 2 | 2 |
| 14 | DF | (Brazil) | Cacá | 22 | 19 | 9 | 9 | 3 | 3 | 34 | 31 |
| 15 | MF | (Brazil) | Adriano | 21 | 18 | 3 | 2 | 1 | 1 | 25 | 21 |
| 16 | MF | (Brazil) | Jadsom | 27 | 23 | 11 | 11 | 3 | 3 | 41 | 37 |
| 18 | FW | (Brazil) | Thiago | 18 | 2 | 6 | 4 | 3 | 3 | 27 | 9 |
| 19 | FW | (Brazil) | Stênio | 5 | 3 | 3 | 3 | 0 | 0 | 8 | 6 |
| 20 | MF | (Brazil) | Marco Antônio | 0 | 0 | 5 | 0 | 2 | 0 | 7 | 0 |
| 21 | FW | (Brazil) | Welinton | 22 | 3 | 8 | 0 | 1 | 0 | 31 | 3 |
| 22 | DF | (Brazil) | Patrick Brey | 15 | 8 | 2 | 2 | 0 | 0 | 17 | 10 |
| 23 | FW | (Brazil) | Rafael Sóbis | 16 | 16 | 0 | 0 | 0 | 0 | 16 | 16 |
| 25 | MF | (Brazil) | Machado | 29 | 19 | 6 | 5 | 2 | 2 | 37 | 26 |
| 31 | DF | (Brazil) | Giovanni | 6 | 6 | 1 | 1 | 1 | 1 | 8 | 8 |
| 32 | DF | (Brazil) | Manoel | 25 | 24 | 0 | 0 | 1 | 1 | 26 | 25 |
| 33 | DF | (Brazil) | Paulo | 2 | 1 | 0 | 0 | 0 | 0 | 2 | 1 |
| 36 | DF | (Brazil) | Matheus Pereira | 25 | 22 | 0 | 0 | 0 | 0 | 25 | 22 |
| 39 | GK | (Brazil) | Vitor Eudes | 1 | 0 | 1 | 1 | 0 | 0 | 2 | 1 |
| 47 | FW | (Brazil) | Riquelmo | 2 | 1 | 0 | 0 | 1 | 1 | 3 | 2 |
| 49 | MF | (Brazil) | Claudinho | 11 | 0 | 3 | 1 | 0 | 0 | 14 | 1 |
| 50 | DF | (Brazil) | Rafael Luiz | 13 | 6 | 0 | 0 | 0 | 0 | 13 | 6 |
| 59 | FW | (Brazil) | Zé Eduardo | 1 | 0 | 0 | 0 | 0 | 0 | 1 | 0 |
| 77 | FW | (Brazil) | Airton | 30 | 27 | 0 | 0 | 1 | 0 | 31 | 27 |
| 88 | MF | (Brazil) | Jadson | 14 | 5 | 0 | 0 | 0 | 0 | 14 | 5 |
| 94 | MF | (Brazil) | Giovanni | 10 | 6 | 0 | 0 | 0 | 0 | 10 | 6 |
| 99 | FW | (Brazil) | Sassá | 11 | 6 | 0 | 0 | 0 | 0 | 11 | 6 |
Players who are on loan/returned to the youth team/left Cruzeiro that have appeared this season
| – | DF | (Brazil) | Arthur | 0 | 0 | 3 | 2 | 2 | 1 | 5 | 3 |
| – | DF | (Brazil) | Daniel Guedes | 7 | 6 | 0 | 0 | 0 | 0 | 7 | 6 |
| – | DF | (Brazil) | Edílson | 0 | 0 | 6 | 6 | 3 | 3 | 9 | 9 |
| – | DF | (Brazil) | Edu | 0 | 0 | 2 | 1 | 1 | 1 | 3 | 2 |
| – | DF | (Brazil) | João Lucas | 4 | 0 | 8 | 6 | 3 | 3 | 15 | 9 |
| – | DF | (Brazil) | Marllon | 1 | 0 | 3 | 3 | 0 | 0 | 4 | 3 |
| – | DF | (Brazil) | Rafael Santos | 0 | 0 | 3 | 3 | 1 | 0 | 4 | 3 |
| – | DF | (Brazil) | Valdir | 0 | 0 | 2 | 2 | 0 | 0 | 2 | 2 |
| – | MF | (Argentina) | Ariel Cabral | 8 | 6 | 3 | 3 | 1 | 1 | 12 | 10 |
| – | MF | (Brazil) | Everton Felipe | 0 | 0 | 6 | 6 | 3 | 3 | 9 | 9 |
| – | MF | (Brazil) | Jean | 4 | 3 | 5 | 3 | 0 | 0 | 9 | 6 |
| – | MF | (Brazil) | Marquinhos Gabriel | 4 | 3 | 0 | 0 | 0 | 0 | 4 | 3 |
| – | MF | (Brazil) | Maurício | 17 | 11 | 11 | 11 | 4 | 4 | 32 | 26 |
| – | MF | (Brazil) | Pedro Bicalho | 0 | 0 | 4 | 3 | 2 | 0 | 6 | 3 |
| – | MF | (Brazil) | Robinho | 0 | 0 | 0 | 0 | 1 | 0 | 1 | 0 |
| – | MF | (Brazil) | Rodriguinho | 0 | 0 | 2 | 2 | 0 | 0 | 2 | 2 |
| – | FW | (Brazil) | Alexandre Jesus | 0 | 0 | 4 | 4 | 1 | 1 | 5 | 5 |
| – | FW | (Colombia) | Angulo | 0 | 0 | 1 | 1 | 0 | 0 | 1 | 1 |
| – | FW | (Brazil) | Caio | 2 | 0 | 2 | 0 | 0 | 0 | 4 | 0 |
| – | FW | (Brazil) | Jhonata Robert | 0 | 0 | 5 | 3 | 2 | 1 | 7 | 4 |
| – | FW | (Brazil) | Judivan | 0 | 0 | 7 | 1 | 2 | 0 | 9 | 1 |
| – | FW | (Brazil) | Roberson | 5 | 0 | 6 | 4 | 2 | 2 | 13 | 6 |
| – | FW | (Brazil) | Vinícius Popó | 0 | 0 | 3 | 0 | 0 | 0 | 3 | 0 |

=== Goalscorers ===
Includes all competitive matches.

As of match played 29 January 2021.

| Rank | Pos. | No. | Player | Série B | Campeonato Mineiro | Copa do Brasil | Total |
|---|---|---|---|---|---|---|---|
| 1 | FW | 23 | (Brazil) Rafael Sóbis | 6 | 0 | 0 | 6 |
| 2 | DF | 32 | (Brazil) Manoel | 5 | 0 | 0 | 5 |
| 2 | MF | – | (Brazil) Maurício | 1 | 4 | 0 | 5 |
| 3 | FW | 7 | (Brazil) Arthur Caíke | 4 | 0 | 0 | 4 |
| 3 | FW | 77 | (Brazil) Airton | 4 | 0 | 0 | 4 |
| 4 | FW | 9 | (Bolivia) Marcelo Moreno | 3 | 0 | 0 | 3 |
| 4 | MF | 10 | (Brazil) Régis | 2 | 1 | 0 | 3 |
| 4 | FW | 11 | (Brazil) William Pottker | 3 | 0 | 0 | 3 |
| 4 | FW | 18 | (Brazil) Thiago | 0 | 3 | 0 | 3 |
| 5 | DF | 2 | (Paraguay) Cáceres | 2 | 0 | 0 | 2 |
| 5 | DF | 4 | (Brazil) Ramon | 1 | 1 | 0 | 2 |
| 5 | DF | 14 | (Brazil) Cacá | 1 | 1 | 0 | 2 |
| 5 | FW | 21 | (Brazil) Welinton | 1 | 1 | 0 | 2 |
| 5 | MF | 25 | (Brazil) Machado | 2 | 0 | 0 | 2 |
| 5 | DF | – | (Brazil) Edílson | 0 | 2 | 0 | 2 |
| 6 | DF | 3 | (Brazil) Léo | 1 | 0 | 0 | 1 |
| 6 | DF | 31 | (Brazil) Giovanni | 0 | 0 | 1 | 1 |
| 6 | DF | 36 | (Brazil) Matheus Pereira | 1 | 0 | 0 | 1 |
| 6 | DF | – | (Brazil) Arthur | 0 | 1 | 0 | 1 |
| 6 | DF | – | (Brazil) Edu | 0 | 0 | 1 | 1 |
| 6 | DF | – | (Brazil) João Lucas | 0 | 0 | 1 | 1 |
| 6 | DF | – | (Brazil) Marllon | 0 | 1 | 0 | 1 |
| 6 | MF | – | (Brazil) Jean | 1 | 0 | 0 | 1 |
| 6 | MF | – | (Brazil) Pedro Bicalho | 0 | 1 | 0 | 1 |
| 6 | FW | – | (Brazil) Alexandre Jesus | 0 | 0 | 1 | 1 |
| 6 | FW | – | (Brazil) Jhonata Robert | 0 | 1 | 0 | 1 |
| 6 | FW | – | (Brazil) Roberson | 0 | 1 | 0 | 1 |
| Own Goals | | | | 1 | 1 | 0 | 2 |
| Total | | | | 39 | 19 | 4 | 62 |

=== Assists ===
Includes all competitive matches. Not all goals have an assist.

As of match played 29 January 2021.

| Rank | Pos. | No. | Player | Série B | Campeonato Mineiro | Copa do Brasil | Total |
|---|---|---|---|---|---|---|---|
| 1 | MF | 25 | (Brazil) Machado | 6 | 2 | 1 | 9 |
| 2 | MF | 10 | (Brazil) Régis | 4 | 0 | 0 | 4 |
| 2 | DF | 22 | (Brazil) Patrick Brey | 3 | 1 | 0 | 4 |
| 3 | DF | 2 | (Paraguay) Cáceres | 2 | 1 | 0 | 3 |
| 3 | MF | – | (Brazil) Maurício | 0 | 2 | 1 | 3 |
| 4 | FW | 9 | (Bolivia) Marcelo Moreno | 1 | 1 | 0 | 2 |
| 4 | FW | 11 | (Brazil) William Pottker | 2 | 0 | 0 | 2 |
| 4 | DF | 32 | (Brazil) Manoel | 2 | 0 | 0 | 2 |
| 4 | FW | 77 | (Brazil) Airton | 2 | 0 | 0 | 2 |
| 4 | DF | – | (Brazil) Edílson | 0 | 2 | 0 | 2 |
| 4 | FW | – | (Brazil) Roberson | 1 | 1 | 0 | 2 |
| 5 | FW | 7 | (Brazil) Arthur Caíke | 1 | 0 | 0 | 1 |
| 5 | MF | 15 | (Brazil) Adriano | 0 | 1 | 0 | 1 |
| 5 | MF | 19 | (Brazil) Stênio | 0 | 1 | 0 | 1 |
| 5 | FW | 21 | (Brazil) Welinton | 1 | 0 | 0 | 1 |
| 5 | FW | 23 | (Brazil) Rafael Sóbis | 1 | 0 | 0 | 1 |
| 5 | DF | 36 | (Brazil) Matheus Pereira | 1 | 0 | 0 | 1 |
| 5 | FW | 47 | (Brazil) Riquelmo | 0 | 0 | 1 | 1 |
| 5 | MF | – | (Argentina) Ariel Cabral | 1 | 0 | 0 | 1 |

=== Clean sheets ===
Includes all competitive matches.

As of match played 29 January 2021.

| Rank | Pos. | No. | Player | Série B | Campeonato Mineiro | Copa do Brasil | Total |
|---|---|---|---|---|---|---|---|
| 1 | GK | 1 | (Brazil) Fábio | 13 | 4 | 0 | 17 |
| 2 | GK | 39 | (Brazil) Vitor Eudes | 1 | 1 | 0 | 2 |
| 3 | GK | 12 | (Brazil) Lucas França | 1 | 0 | 0 | 1 |

=== Disciplinary record ===
Includes all competitive matches.

As of match played 29 January 2021.

| No. | Pos. | Name | Série B | | Campeonato Mineiro | | Copa do Brasil | | Total | |
| No. | Pos. | Name | Booked | Sent off (straight red) | Booked | Sent off (straight red) | Booked | Sent off (straight red) | Booked | Sent off (straight red) |
|---|---|---|---|---|---|---|---|---|---|---|
| 1 | GK | (Brazil) Fábio | 4 | 1 | 0 | 0 | 0 | 0 | 4 | 1 |
| 2 | DF | (Brazil) Cáceres | 1 | 0 | 0 | 0 | 0 | 0 | 1 | 0 |
| 3 | DF | (Brazil) Léo | 0 | 0 | 1 | 0 | 1 | 0 | 2 | 0 |
| 4 | DF | (Brazil) Ramon | 3 | 0 | 0 | 0 | 0 | 0 | 3 | 0 |
| 8 | MF | (Brazil) Henrique | 1 | 0 | 0 | 0 | 0 | 0 | 1 | 0 |
| 9 | FW | (Bolivia) Marcelo Moreno | 6 | 0 | 1 | 0 | 1 | 0 | 8 | 0 |
| 10 | MF | (Brazil) Régis | 4 | 0 | 0 | 0 | 0 | 0 | 4 | 0 |
| 11 | FW | (Brazil) William Pottker | 10 | 2 | 0 | 0 | 0 | 0 | 10 | 2 |
| 12 | GK | (Brazil) Lucas França | 2 | 0 | 0 | 0 | 0 | 0 | 2 | 0 |
| 14 | DF | (Brazil) Cacá | 7 | 0 | 0 | 0 | 0 | 0 | 7 | 0 |
| 15 | MF | (Brazil) Adriano | 5 | 0 | 3 | 0 | 0 | 0 | 8 | 0 |
| 16 | MF | (Brazil) Jadsom | 7 | 0 | 4 | 0 | 2 | 0 | 13 | 0 |
| 18 | FW | (Brazil) Thiago | 0 | 0 | 2 | 0 | 1 | 0 | 3 | 0 |
| 19 | FW | (Brazil) Stênio | 0 | 0 | 1 | 0 | 0 | 0 | 1 | 0 |
| 20 | MF | (Brazil) Marco Antônio | 0 | 0 | 1 | 0 | 0 | 0 | 1 | 0 |
| 21 | FW | (Brazil) Welinton | 1 | 0 | 1 | 0 | 0 | 0 | 2 | 0 |
| 22 | DF | (Brazil) Patrick Brey | 1 | 0 | 0 | 0 | 0 | 0 | 1 | 0 |
| 23 | FW | (Brazil) Rafael Sóbis | 4 | 0 | 0 | 0 | 0 | 0 | 4 | 0 |
| 25 | MF | (Brazil) Machado | 6 | 0 | 3 | 0 | 1 | 0 | 10 | 0 |
| 32 | DF | (Brazil) Manoel | 3 | 0 | 0 | 0 | 0 | 0 | 3 | 0 |
| 36 | DF | (Brazil) Matheus Pereira | 6 | 0 | 0 | 0 | 0 | 0 | 6 | 0 |
| 38 | DF | (Brazil) Daniel Guedes | 3 | 0 | 0 | 0 | 0 | 0 | 3 | 0 |
| 77 | FW | (Brazil) Airton | 9 | 0 | 0 | 0 | 0 | 0 | 9 | 0 |
| 88 | MF | (Brazil) Jadson | 1 | 0 | 0 | 0 | 0 | 0 | 1 | 0 |
| 94 | MF | (Brazil) Giovanni | 1 | 1 | 0 | 0 | 0 | 0 | 1 | 1 |
| – | DF | (Brazil) Arthur | 0 | 0 | 2 | 0 | 0 | 0 | 2 | 0 |
| – | DF | (Brazil) Edilson | 0 | 0 | 4 | 0 | 2 | 0 | 6 | 0 |
| – | DF | (Brazil) Edu | 0 | 0 | 1 | 0 | 2 | 1 | 3 | 1 |
| – | DF | (Brazil) Marllon | 0 | 0 | 1 | 0 | 0 | 0 | 1 | 0 |
| – | DF | (Brazil) Rafael Santos | 0 | 0 | 1 | 0 | 0 | 0 | 1 | 0 |
| – | MF | (Argentina) Ariel Cabral | 3 | 0 | 1 | 0 | 0 | 0 | 4 | 0 |
| – | MF | (Brazil) Marquinhos Gabriel | 1 | 0 | 0 | 0 | 0 | 0 | 1 | 0 |
| – | MF | (Brazil) Maurício | 1 | 0 | 3 | 0 | 1 | 0 | 5 | 0 |
| – | MF | (Brazil) Robinho | 0 | 0 | 1 | 0 | 1 | 0 | 2 | 0 |
| – | FW | (Brazil) Jhonata Robert | 0 | 0 | 1 | 0 | 0 | 0 | 1 | 0 |
| – | FW | (Brazil) Judivan | 0 | 0 | 1 | 0 | 1 | 0 | 2 | 0 |
| – | FW | (Brazil) Roberson | 1 | 0 | 0 | 0 | 0 | 0 | 1 | 0 |
