= Giovanni Palmieri =

Giovanni Palmieri may refer to:

- Giovanni Palmieri (tennis) (1906-unknown), Italian tennis player
- Giovanni Palmieri (footballer) (born 1989), Brazilian footballer
