= 1998 Copa Norte =

2nd edition of a Brazilian association football competition

Tournament details
- Country: Brazil
- Dates: 5 March – 22 April
- Teams: 8

Final positions
- Champions: (Maranhão) Sampaio Corrêa (1st title)
- Runners-up: (Amazonas (Brazilian state)) São Raimundo

Tournament statistics
- Matches played: 14
- Goals scored: 51 (3.64 per match)
- Top goal scorer(s): (Brazil) Júnior (6 goals)

The 1998 Copa Norte was the second edition of a football competition held in Brazil. Featuring 8 clubs, Acre, Amapá, Amazonas, Maranhão, Pará, Piauí, Rondônia and Roraima with one vacancy.

In the finals, Sampaio Corrêa defeated São Raimundo 3–0 on penalties after tied 2–2 on aggregate to win their first title and earn the right to play in the 1998 Copa CONMEBOL.

== Qualified teams ==
Association	Team	Qualification method
(Acre (state)) Acre; 1 berth	Rio Branco	1997 Campeonato Acreano champions
(Amapá) Amapá; 1 berth	Ypiranga	1997 Campeonato Amapaense champions
(Amazonas (Brazilian state)) Amazonas; 1 berth	São Raimundo	1997 Campeonato Amazonense champions
(Maranhão) Maranhão; 1 berth	Sampaio Corrêa	1997 Campeonato Maranhense champions
(Pará) Pará; 1 berth	Paysandu	1997 Campeonato Paraense runners-up
(Piauí) Piauí; 1 berth	Picos	1997 Campeonato Piauiense champions
(Rondônia) Rondônia; 1 berth	Ouro Preto	1997 Campeonato Rondoniense runners-up
(Roraima) Roraima; 1 berth	São Raimundo	1997 Campeonato Roraimense runners-up

== Bracket ==
Quarter-finals
(Rondônia) Ouro Preto	0	2	2
(Acre (state)) Rio Branco	2	1	3
(Amazonas (Brazilian state)) São Raimundo (p)	3	0	3 (3)
(Pará) Paysandu	0	3	3 (2)
(Roraima) São Raimundo	1	0	1
(Maranhão) Sampaio Corrêa	5	10	15
(Amapá) Ypiranga (p)	2	1	3 (11)
(Piauí) Picos	2	1	3 (10)

Semi-Finals
(Acre (state)) Rio Branco	2	1	3
(Amazonas (Brazilian state)) São Raimundo	1	5	6
(Maranhão) Sampaio Corrêa	2	2	4
(Amapá) Ypiranga	0	1	1

Finals
(Amazonas (Brazilian state)) São Raimundo	1	1	2 (0)
(Maranhão) Sampaio Corrêa (p)	0	2	2 (3)

== Finals ==
15 April 1998

São Raimundo (Amazonas (Brazilian state))	1–0	(Maranhão) Sampaio Corrêa
Jeremias 9'	Report

Estádio Ismael Benigno, Manaus

22 April 1998

Sampaio Corrêa (Maranhão)	2–1	(Amazonas (Brazilian state)) São Raimundo
Toninho 27'; Marcinho 55'	Report	Niltinho 59'
Penalties
	3–0

Castelão, São Luís
Attendance: 29,600
Referee: Saul Brito Duarte

Tied 2–2 on aggregate, Sampaio Corrêa won on penalties.
