= Rubens (footballer, born 1994) =

Brazilian footballer (born 1994)

Personal information
- Full name: Rubens da Silva Coura
- Date of birth: 12 January 1994 (age 32)
- Place of birth: Belo Horizonte, Brazil
- Height: 1.94 m (6 ft 4 in)
- Position: Forward

Team information
- Current team: Floresta

Youth career
- 2013–2015: América Mineiro

Senior career*
Years	Team	Apps	(Gls)
2016–2017	América Mineiro	19	(3)
2016	→ Tupi (loan)	21	(4)
2018–2023	Tombense	71	(21)
2018	→ CSA (loan)	14	(1)
2019	→ Figueirense (loan)	10	(1)
2019	→ Joinville (loan)	0	(0)
2022	→ Vila Nova (loan)	27	(7)
2023	→ São Bento (loan)	9	(1)
2023	→ Ypiranga-RS (loan)	10	(0)
2024	Amazonas	4	(1)
2024	Aparecidense	11	(3)
2025	Brasiliense	11	(2)
2025–	Floresta	24	(1)
- * Club domestic league appearances and goals as of 24 July 2024

Rubens da Silva Coura (born 12 January 1994), simply known as Rubens, is a Brazilian professional footballer who plays as a forward for Floresta.

== Career ==
Revealed at América Mineiro, Rubens was part of the 2017 Series B champion squad. In 2018 he transferred to Tombense, where in 2020 he was Recopa Mineira champion and top scorer in the state with 7 goals. After some loans without establishing himself, on 2 January 2024, he was announced as a reinforcement by Amazonas FC. On 14 June 2024, Rubens signed with Aparecidense.

On 2025 season, Rubens played for Brasiliense FC and Floresta.

== Honours ==
América Mineiro

- Campeonato Brasileiro Série B: 2017

Tombense

- Recopa Mineira: 2020

Individual

- 2020 Campeonato Mineiro top scorer: 7 goals
