= 2020 Campeonato Mineiro =

Campeonato Mineiro
- Season: 2020
- Champions: Atlético Mineiro
- Relegated: Tupynambás; Villa Nova
- Matches: 74
- Goals: 170 (2.3 per match)
- Top goalscorer: Rubens (7 goals)

The 2020 Campeonato Mineiro (officially Campeonato Mineiro SICOOB 2020 – Módulo I for sponsorship reasons) was the 106th edition of the state championship of Minas Gerais organized by FMF. The competition began on 21 January 2020 and ended on 30 August 2020.

On 15 March 2020, FMF suspended the Campeonato Mineiro indefinitely due to the COVID-19 pandemic in Brazil. Complying with the guidelines of the Governo do Estado de Minas Gerais, the tournament resumed behind closed doors on 26 July 2020.

Atlético Mineiro won their 45th Campeonato Mineiro title after defeating Tombense 3–1 on aggregate.

Cruzeiro were the defending champions, but were eliminated in the first stage.

== Format ==
=== First stage ===
The 2020 Módulo I first stage was played by 12 clubs in a single round-robin tournament. The four best-placed teams qualified for the final stage and the bottom two teams were relegated to the 2021 Módulo II.

The three best-placed teams not already qualified for the 2021 seasons of the Série A, Série B or Série C, gained berths in the 2021 Série D. The four best-placed teams qualified for the 2021 Copa do Brasil. If a team qualified for the Copa by other means, their berth would be passed down to the next best-placed team.

=== Knockout stage ===
The knockout stage was played between the 4 best-placed teams from the previous stage in a two-legged tie. In the semifinals and finals, higher-seeded team earned the right to choose the order of the legs. The away goals rule was not used, and if two teams tied on aggregate goals, higher-seeded team would advance.

=== Troféu Inconfidência ===
The Troféu Inconfidência was played between the 5th to 8th-placed teams in a single-elimination tournament. If tied, the penalty shoot-out would be used to determine the winner.

== Participating teams ==
Team	Home city	Manager	2019 result
América Mineiro	Belo Horizonte	Lisca	3rd
Atlético Mineiro	Belo Horizonte	Jorge Sampaoli	2nd
Boa Esporte	Varginha	Nedo Xavier	4th
Caldense	Poços de Caldas	Marcus Paulo Grippi	6th
Coimbra	Contagem	Diogo Giacomini	1st (Módulo II)
Cruzeiro	Belo Horizonte	Enderson Moreira	1st
Patrocinense	Patrocínio	Milagres	7th
Tombense	Tombos	Eugênio Souza	5th
Tupynambás	Juiz de Fora	Guiba	8th
Uberlândia	Uberlândia	Luizinho Lopes	2nd (Módulo II)
URT	Patos de Minas	Johnatan Alemão	10th
Villa Nova	Nova Lima	Ademir Fonseca	9th

== First stage ==
Pos	Team	Pld	W	D	L	GF	GA	GD	Pts	Qualification or relegation
1	Tombense	11	8	2	1	18	6	+12	26	Knockout stage
2	América Mineiro	11	7	4	0	19	7	+12	25	Knockout stage
3	Atlético Mineiro	11	6	4	1	20	7	+13	22	Knockout stage
4	Caldense	11	6	2	3	18	9	+9	20	Knockout stage
5	Cruzeiro	11	6	2	3	16	10	+6	20	Troféu Inconfidência
6	Uberlândia	11	4	2	5	11	13	−2	14	Troféu Inconfidência
7	Boa Esporte	11	3	5	3	10	10	0	14	Troféu Inconfidência
8	Patrocinense	11	3	3	5	10	12	−2	12	Troféu Inconfidência
9	URT	11	3	2	6	5	18	−13	11	
10	Coimbra	11	2	4	5	6	11	−5	10	
11	Villa Nova (R)	11	1	1	9	11	21	−10	4	2021 Módulo II
12	Tupynambás (R)	11	0	3	8	6	26	−20	3	2021 Módulo II

Source: FMF
Rules for classification: 1) Points; 2) Wins; 3) Goal difference; 4) Goals scored; 5) Head-to-head results (only if two teams are tied); 6) Fewest red cards received; 7) Fewest yellow cards received; 8) Draw.
(R) Relegated

== Troféu Inconfidência ==
=== Bracket ===
Semi-finals
5	Cruzeiro	3
8	Patrocinense	0
6	Uberlândia (p)	2 (5)
7	Boa Esporte	2 (4)

Final
5	Cruzeiro	—
6	Uberlândia (awd.)	—

The Troféu Inconfidência Final was scheduled to be contested between Cruzeiro and Uberlândia at Mineirão in Belo Horizonte on 5 August 2020. The Final was cancelled after thirteen players and staff of Uberlândia tested positive for COVID-19. FMF awarded the title to Uberlândia, following an agreement with Cruzeiro.

== Knockout stage ==
=== Bracket ===
Semi-finals
3	Atlético Mineiro	2	3	5
2	América Mineiro	1	0	1
4	Caldense	0	0	0
1	Tombense	1	2	3

Finals
3	Atlético Mineiro	2	1	3
1	Tombense	1	0	1

=== Semi-finals ===
==== Group B ====
2 August 2020
11:00

Caldense	0–1	Tombense
	Report	João Paulo 14'

Estádio Independência, Belo Horizonte
Attendance: 0
Referee: Marco Aurélio Augusto Fazekas Ferreira

5 August 2020
16:00

Tombense	2–0	Caldense
Cássio Ortega 27'; Gabriel Lima 79'	Report

Estádio Independência, Belo Horizonte
Attendance: 0
Referee: Ricardo Marques

Tombense won 3–0 on the aggregate and advanced to the finals.

==== Group C ====
2 August 2020
16:00

Atlético Mineiro	2–1	América Mineiro
Jair 18'; Nathan 39'	Report	Ademir 49'

Mineirão, Belo Horizonte
Attendance: 0
Referee: Ronei Cândido Alves

5 August 2020
21:30

América Mineiro	0–3	Atlético Mineiro
	Report	Réver 55'; Marrony 72'; Savarino 85'

Estádio Independência, Belo Horizonte
Attendance: 0
Referee: Felipe Fernandes de Lima

Atlético Mineiro won 5–1 on the aggregate and advanced to the finals.

=== Finals ===
26 August 2020
21:30

Atlético Mineiro	2–1	Tombense
Eduardo Sasha 64'; Keno 90+7'	Report	Rubens 62' (pen.)

Mineirão, Belo Horizonte
Attendance: 0
Referee: Marco Aurélio Augusto Fazekas Ferreira

30 August 2020
16:00

Tombense	0–1	Atlético Mineiro
	Report	Jair 45+3'

Mineirão, Belo Horizonte
Attendance: 0
Referee: Ronei Cândido Alves

Atlético Mineiro won 3–1 on the aggregate.

== Top goalscorers ==
Rank	Player	Club	Goals
1	Rubens	Tombense	7
2	Ademir	América Mineiro	5
2	Paulo Renê	Patrocinense	5
4	Cássio Ortega	Tombense	4
4	João Victor	Caldense	4
4	Maurício	Cruzeiro	4
4	Nathan	Caldense	4
4	Rodolfo	América Mineiro	4
4	Zé Eduardo	Villa Nova	4
