= Alexandre Jesus =

Brazilian footballer (born 2001)

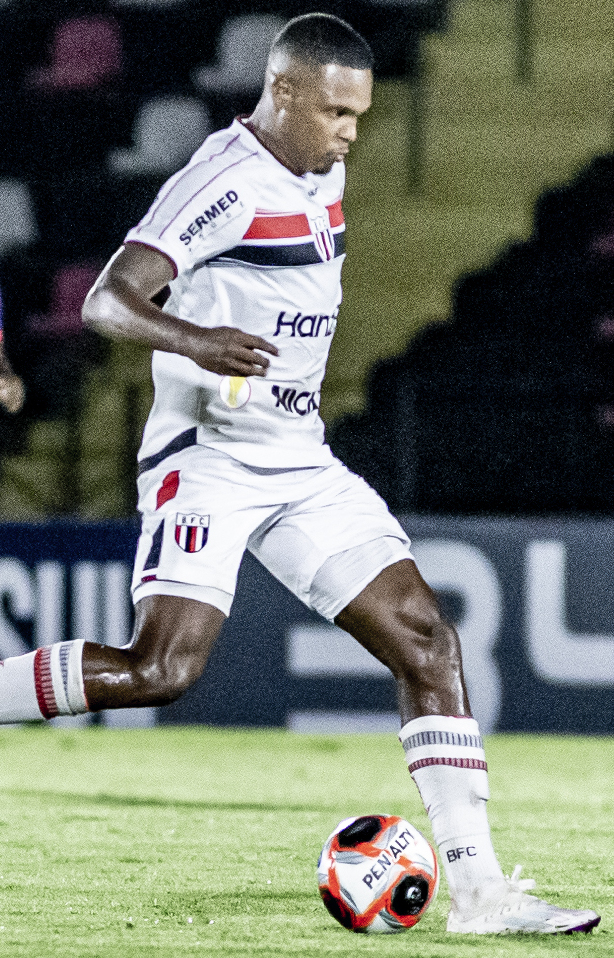
- Alexandre Jesus playing for Botafogo-SP in 2025

Personal information
- Full name: Alexandre de Jesus Jeruzalem Júnior
- Date of birth: 16 September 2001 (age 25)
- Place of birth: Nova Lima, Brazil
- Height: 1.83 m (6 ft 0 in)
- Position: Forward

Team information
- Current team: Orenburg
- Number: 19

Youth career
- 2015: Villa Nova
- 2016: Frigoarnaldo
- 2017: Villa Nova
- 2018: Betim
- 2018–2020: Cruzeiro
- 2021: Fluminense

Senior career*
Years	Team	Apps	(Gls)
2020	Cruzeiro	4	(0)
2021–2024	Fluminense	13	(1)
2023	→ Tombense (loan)	12	(1)
2024	→ Botafogo-SP (loan)	24	(5)
2025	Botafogo-SP	29	(7)
2025–	Orenburg	23	(4)
- * Club domestic league appearances and goals as of 21 November 2026

Alexandre de Jesus Jeruzalem Júnior (born 16 September 2001), known as Alexandre Jesus, is a Brazilian footballer who plays as a forward for Russian club Orenburg.

== Life and career ==
On 22 January 2020, Jesus made his professional debut when he started for Cruzeiro in their Campeonato Mineiro match against Boa Esporte Clube.

On 6 August 2025, Jesus signed with Russian Premier League club Orenburg.

== Honours ==
=== Club ===
Fluminense

- Taça Guanabara: 2023
- Campeonato Carioca: 2023
- Copa Libertadores da América: 2023

== Career statistics ==
As of 21 November 2026

Club	Season	League			Cup		Continental		Other		Total	
Club	Season	Division	Apps	Goals	Apps	Goals	Apps	Goals	Apps	Goals	Apps	Goals
Cruzeiro	2020	Campeonato Brasileiro Série B	0	0	1	1	–		4 (Note: Appearances in Campeonato Mineiro)	0	5	1
Fluminense	2021	Campeonato Brasileiro Série A	1	0	0	0	0	0	2 (Note: Appearances in Campeonato Carioca)	1	3	1
Fluminense	2022	Campeonato Brasileiro Série A	5	0	1	0	0	0	0	0	6	0
Fluminense	2023	Campeonato Brasileiro Série A	1	0	1	0	0	0	0	0	2	0
Fluminense	2024	Campeonato Brasileiro Série A	0	0	0	0	0	0	4	0	4	0
Fluminense	Total		7	0	2	0	0	0	6	1	15	1
Tombense (loan)	2023	Campeonato Brasileiro Série B	12	1	–		–		–		12	1
Botafogo-SP (loan)	2024	Campeonato Brasileiro Série B	24	5	–		–		–		24	5
Botafogo-SP	2025	Campeonato Brasileiro Série B	17	4	–		–		12 (Note: Appearances in Campeonato Paulista)	3	29	7
Orenburg	2025–26	Russian Premier League	14	3	5	0	–		–		19	3
Orenburg	2026–27	Russian Premier League	9	1	2	1	–		–		11	2
Orenburg	Total		23	4	7	1	0	0	0	0	30	5
Career total			83	14	10	2	0	0	22	4	115	20
