= Sampaio Corrêa Futebol Clube =

Brazilian association football club based in São Luís, Maranhão, Brazil

Sampaio Corrêa
- Full name: Sampaio Corrêa Futebol Clube
- Nicknames: Bolívia (Bolivia); Bolívia Querida (Bolivia Dear); Bolivão (Bolivao); Esquadrão de Aço (Steel Squadron); Mais Querido da Cidade (Sweetest in the City); Paiô; Time de Escol (Choice Team); Tricolor de Aço (Steel Tricolor); Tricolor de São Pantaleão (Tricolor of Saint Pantaleon); Tubarão (Shark)
- Founded: 25 March 1923; 103 years ago
- Ground: Castelão
- Capacity: 40,149
- President: Sérgio Frota
- Head coach: Gerson Gusmão
- League: Campeonato Brasileiro Série D Campeonato Maranhense
- 2025 2025: Série D, 27th of 64; Maranhense, 4th of 8
- Website: www.sampaiocorreafc.com.br
Home colors	Away colors

Sampaio Corrêa Futebol Clube, better known simply as Sampaio Corrêa or just Sampaio, was founded on 25 March 1923 by a group of young workers practicing amateur football on São Pantaleão Street, in the Centro neighborhood of São Luís, which gave rise to the nickname “Tricolor of Saint Pantaleon”. The club's name and colors were inspired by the Sampaio Corrêa II Hydroplane, which landed in the capital of Maranhão in December 1922.

Quite popular in the Brazilian football scene, Sampaio Corrêa is recognized for having the biggest fan base in the state of Maranhão. The club has several organized fan groups, but the main ones are Tubarões da Fiel and Brava Bolivia (Barra Brava). Having the shark as its mascot and its colors are red, green and yellow. Sampaio Corrêa plays its home games at Castelão. Its main rivals are Moto and Maranhão, with whom it shares the biggest rivalries in Maranhão football. Due to the unity between the Sampaio Corrêa and Imperatriz fans, there is no intense rivalry between the clubs, consequently leaving a very friendly atmosphere when they face each other. It is the club that has the most titles in the Maranhense Championship with 37 victories - eight of them undefeated - and is the only one in Maranhão that won the Copa Norte (in 1998) and the Copa do Nordeste (in 2018), being, thus, the only club in Brazil to be champion of two different regionals. It is also the only Brazilian club to have been champion of three different national divisions - the Série B in 1972, the Série C in 1997 and the Série D in 2012.

In national competitions, it has participated in 12 editions of Série A (also including the Taça Brasil era), 18 in Série B and another 26 in the Copa do Brasil. Sampaio Corrêa is still the only team from Maranhão to have participated in an official international tournament, the Copa CONMEBOL in 1998, having reached the semifinals stage.

== History ==
On March 25, 1923, the club was founded as Associação Sampaio Corrêa Futebol Clube. Abrahão Andrade was the Sampaio Corrêa's first president. The club is named after a seaplane called Sampaio Corrêa II, which visited the city of São Luís on December 12, 1922, and was commanded by two pilots, the Brazilian Euclides Pinto Martins and the American Walter Hinton. On April 26, 1925, the club played its first official match. Sampaio Corrêa beat Luso Brasileiro 1–0. The goal was scored by Lobo.

On December 17, 1972, the club won the Campeonato Brasileiro Second Division, after beating Campinense in the final. However, there was no promotion to the first division.

In 1997, the club won the Campeonato Brasileiro Third Division, after beating Francana 3–1 in the last match, and was promoted to the following year's Second Division. In 1998, Sampaio Corrêa won the Copa Norte, beating São Raimundo-AM in the final. In the same year, the club reached Copa CONMEBOL's semi-final round. Sampaio Corrêa beat América de Natal in the first round, Deportes Quindío of Colombia in the second round, and was eliminated by Santos in the semi-finals.

Sampaio Correa returned to the Serie B for its 2014 season, after finishing fourth in the first stage of the 2013 Série C and eventually reaching the final, losing to Santa Cruz 2–1 on aggregate. However, the club later suffered two more relegations, in 2016 and 2018. The club had a good 2020 season, finishing sixth and just four points from promotion. In the 2022 season, Sampaio finished fifth, only four points from promotion behind traditional Rio based club Vasco, whom were defeated twice by Sampaio Correa, 3–1 in Sao Luis and 3–2 in Rio. Other highlights of the campaign include a 4–1 victory against Sport, and a 2–1 victory over traditional powerhouse Gremio.

== Stadium ==
Its home matches are usually played at Castelão stadium, which has a maximum capacity of 40,000 people.

== Current squad ==
According to the official website.

As of 24 October 2023

Note: Flags indicate national team as defined under FIFA eligibility rules; some limited exceptions apply. Players may hold more than one non-FIFA nationality.

No.	Pos.	Nation	Player
—	GK	BRA	Thiago Braga
—	GK	BRA	Carlos Eduardo
—	GK	BRA	Erikson
—	GK	BRA	Luiz Daniel
—	DF	BRA	Alyson
—	DF	BRA	Fábio Aguiar
—	DF	BRA	Ícaro
—	DF	BRA	Rafael Jansen
—	DF	BRA	Leonan (on loan from Capivariano)
—	DF	BRA	Lucas Mota
—	DF	BRA	Pará
—	DF	BRA	Mateus Pivô
—	DF	BRA	Samuel Santos
—	DF	BRA	Vitinho (on loan from Grêmio)
—	MF	BRA	Claudinei
—	MF	BRA	Eloir
—	MF	BRA	Ferreira
—	MF	BRA	Luiz Otávio (on loan from Tombense)

No.	Pos.	Nation	Player
—	MF	BRA	Maurício
—	MF	BRA	Nadson Mesquita
—	MF	BRA	Mikael
—	MF	BRA	Paraíba
—	MF	BRA	Patrick Allan
—	MF	BRA	Riquelmo (on loan from Fortaleza)
—	MF	BRA	Rodrigo Souza (on loan from Criciúma)
—	MF	BRA	Robinho (on loan from Cascavel)
—	FW	BRA	Vinícius Alves (on loan from Atlético Cearense)
—	FW	BRA	Henrique
—	FW	BRA	João Diogo
—	FW	BRA	Getterson
—	FW	BRA	Jô (on loan from Botafogo)
—	FW	BRA	Pimentinha
—	FW	BRA	Gabriel Silva
—	FW	BRA	Thiaguinho (on loan from Flamengo)
—	FW	BRA	Ytalo (on loan from Red Bull Bragantino)

=== Out on loan ===
Note: Flags indicate national team as defined under FIFA eligibility rules; some limited exceptions apply. Players may hold more than one non-FIFA nationality.

No. / Pos. / Nation / Player; — / MF / BRA / Wesley Dias (at Botafogo-PB until 30 November 2023)	No. / Pos. / Nation / Player; — / MF / BRA / Gabriel Popó (at Sousa until 30 November 2023)

=== First-team staff ===
Position	Name	Nationality
Manager	Felipe Surian	Brazil
Assistant manager	Rainer Oliveira	Brazil
Assistant manager	Marcelo Mendes	Brazil
Assistant manager	Rafael Gatti	Brazil

== Honours ==
=== Official tournaments ===
National
Competitions	Titles	Seasons
Campeonato Brasileiro Série B	1	1972
Campeonato Brasileiro Série C	1	1997
Campeonato Brasileiro Série D	1	2012
Regional
Competitions	Titles	Seasons
Copa do Nordeste	1	2018
Copa Norte	1	1998
Inter-state
Competitions	Titles	Seasons
Torneio Marinho Rodrigues	1^{s}	1964
State
Competitions	Titles	Seasons
Campeonato Maranhense	37	1933, 1934, 1940, 1942, 1953, 1954, 1956, 1961, 1962, 1964, 1965, 1972, 1975, 1976, 1978, 1980, 1984, 1985, 1986, 1987, 1988, 1990, 1991, 1992, 1997, 1998, 2002, 2003, 2010, 2011, 2012, 2014, 2017, 2020, 2021, 2022, 2024
Copa FMF	11	1973, 1976, 1983, 1984, 1990, 2002, 2007, 2009, 2011, 2012, 2013

- record
- ^{s} shared record

=== Others tournaments ===
==== Inter-state ====
- Torneio Pará-Maranhão (1): 1973

=== Runners-up ===
- Campeonato Brasileiro Série C (2): 2013, 2019
- Copa Norte (1): 1999
- Campeonato Maranhense (29): 1926, 1927, 1943, 1946, 1947, 1948, 1950, 1951, 1955, 1958, 1960, 1966, 1968, 1970, 1971, 1979, 1981, 1982, 1994, 1996, 1999, 2000, 2001, 2004, 2006, 2008, 2009, 2015, 2016
- Copa FMF (2): 1993, 2008

=== Women's Football ===
- Campeonato Maranhense de Futebol Feminino (2): 2017, 2025
