= 1964 Torneio Marinho Rodrigues =

Torneio Marinho Rodrigues Torneio Maranhão-Piauí
- Season: 1964
- Champions: Sampaio Corrêa (1st title)
- Matches: 30
- Goals: 106 (3.53 per match)

The 1964 Torneio Marinho Rodrigues, or Torneio Maranhão-Piauí, was the 1st edition of the Torneio Marinho Rodrigues, organized by the football federations of Maranhão and Piauí. The tournament was well received by the supporters of both Maranhão and Piauí teams, and was also sponsored by Maranhão's local radio Timbira.

The tournament was played from April 12 to June 16 by EC Flamengo, Maranhão, Moto Club, Piauí, River and Sampaio Corrêa. It was won by Sampaio Corrêa, marking their first official title outside of state championships, and one of the four titles won by Bolívia Querida that year.

== Teams ==
Marinho Rodrigues counted with three teams from each state participating, cited below:

Association	Team
(Maranhão) Maranhão; 3 berths	Maranhão
(Maranhão) Maranhão; 3 berths	Moto Club
(Maranhão) Maranhão; 3 berths	Sampaio Corrêa
(Piauí) Piauí; 3 berths	Flamengo
(Piauí) Piauí; 3 berths	Piauí
(Piauí) Piauí; 3 berths	River

== League table ==
Pos	Team	Pld	W	D	L	GF	GA	GD	Pts	Qualification
1	(Maranhão) Sampaio Corrêa (C)	10	8	1	1	16	5	+11	17	Champions
2	(Piauí) Flamengo	10	4	3	3	20	19	+1	11	
3	(Maranhão) Moto Club	10	5	0	5	24	16	+8	10	
4	Maranhão	10	5	0	5	19	21	−2	10	
5	(Piauí) River	10	3	1	6	14	22	−8	7	
6	Piauí	10	2	1	7	13	23	−10	5	

Source: RSSSF Brasil
(C) Champions
