= Jadsom =

Brazilian footballer

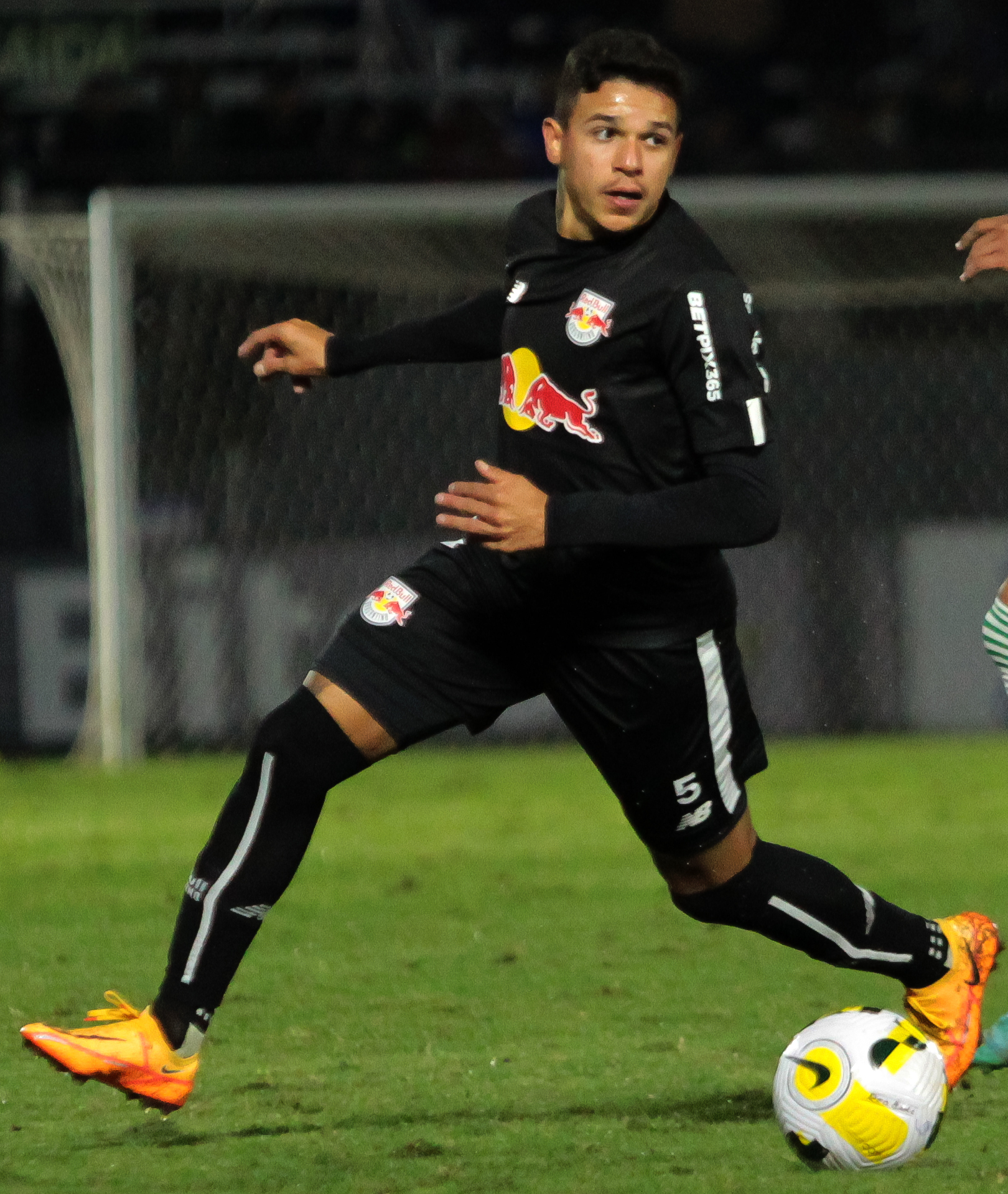
- Jadsom with Red Bull Bragantino in 2022

Personal information
- Full name: Jadsom Meemyas de Oliveira da Silva
- Date of birth: 20 May 2001 (age 25)
- Place of birth: Recife, Brazil
- Height: 1.73 m (5 ft 8 in)
- Position: Midfielder

Team information
- Current team: Al Wahda
- Number: 25

Youth career
- Sport Recife
- 2019–2020: Cruzeiro

Senior career*
Years	Team	Apps	(Gls)
2018–2019	Sport Recife	1	(0)
2019–2021	Cruzeiro	39	(0)
2021–2025	Red Bull Bragantino	116	(2)
2025-	Al Wahda	26	(1)
- * Club domestic league appearances and goals as of 16 March 2026

Jadsom Meemyas de Oliveira da Silva (born 20 May 2001), known as Jadsom, is a Brazilian footballer who plays as a defensive midfielder for Al Wahda.

== Life and career ==
Born in Recife, Silva started his career at Sport Club do Recife where he made his professional debut on February 3, 2019, in a Campeonato Pernambucano's match against América. On February 21, 2019, Silva moved permanently to Cruzeiro where he debuted in the Série A on July 27, 2019, against Athletico Paranaense.

== Career statistics ==
=== Club ===
As of 8 December 2021.

Club	Season	League			State league		Cup		Continental		Other		Total	
Club	Season	Division	Apps	Goals	Apps	Goals	Apps	Goals	Apps	Goals	Apps	Goals	Apps	Goals
Sport Recife	2019	Série B	0	0	1 (Note: Appearance(s) in Campeonato Pernambucano)	0	0	0	—		—		1	0
Cruzeiro	2019	Série A	1	0	0	0	0	0	—		—		1	0
Cruzeiro	2020	Série B	27	0	11 (Note: Appearance(s) in Campeonato Mineiro)	0	3	0	—		—		41	0
Cruzeiro	Total		28	0	11	0	3	0	—		—		42	0
Red Bull Bragantino	2021	Série A	26	1	6 (Note: Appearance(s) in Campeonato Paulista)	0	3	0	10 (Note: Appearance(s) in Copa Sudamericana)	0	—		45	1
Red Bull Bragantino	2022	Série A	29	0	11 (Note: Appearance(s) in Campeonato Paulista & Paulistao A1 - fase final)	0	2	0	6 (Note: Appearance(s) in Libertadores)	0	—		48	0
Red Bull Bragantino	2023	Série A	31	1	11	0	1	0	6	0	—		49	1
Red Bull Bragantino	2024	Série A	30	0	11	0	4	0	11 (Note: Appearance(s) in Copa Sudamericana & Libertadores)	0	—		56	0
Red Bull Bragantino	2025	—			5	0	—		—		—		5	0
Total		116	2	44	0	10	0	33	—		—		203	3
Al Wahda FC	2024/2025	UAE Pro League	9	1	—	—	—	—	—	—	—		9	1
Career total			153	2	56	0	13	0	33	0	0	0	255	2
