= Machado (footballer, born 1996) =

Brazilian footballer

Filipe Machado
Personal information
- Full name: Luiz Filipe da Rosa Machado
- Date of birth: 20 January 1996 (age 30)
- Place of birth: Santa Maria, Brazil
- Height: 1.74 m (5 ft 9 in)
- Position: Centre midfielder

Team information
- Current team: Goiás
- Number: 5

Youth career
- –2011: Inter de Santa Maria
- 2012–2014: Desportivo Brasil
- 2015–2016: Grêmio

Senior career*
Years	Team	Apps	(Gls)
2016–2021	Grêmio	7	(0)
2018	→ Boa Esporte (loan)	22	(2)
2019	→ São José (loan)	28	(4)
2020	→ Cruzeiro (loan)	37	(2)
2022–2024	Cruzeiro	94	(3)
2024–	Vitória	18	(0)
2025	→ Coritiba (loan)	40	(0)
2026–	→ Goiás (loan)	40	(0)
- * Club domestic league appearances and goals as of 17 November 2026

Luiz Filipe da Rosa Machado (born 20 January 1996), commonly known as Filipe Machado or simply Machado, is a Brazilian professional footballer who plays as a defensive midfielder and centre midfielder for Goiás, on loan from Vitória.

== Club career ==
Born in Santa Maria, Brazil, Machado joined the Grêmio's Academy at the age of 19 in 2015. He made his league debut on 28 May 2017 against Sport Recife, starting as a defensive midfielder in a 4–3 away loss, playing full 90 minutes.

== Career statistics ==
=== Club ===
As of 29 March 2021.

Club	Season	League			State League		National Cup		Continental		Other		Total	
Club	Season	Division	Apps	Goals	Apps	Goals	Apps	Goals	Apps	Goals	Apps	Goals	Apps	Goals
Grêmio	2016	Série A	0	0	0	0	—		—		—		0	0
Grêmio	2017	Série A	5	0	0	0	0	0	0	0	2 (Note: Appearance(s) in Primeira Liga.)	0	7	0
Grêmio	2018	Série A	—		—		—		—		—		0	0
Grêmio	2019	Série A	—		—		—		—		—		0	0
Grêmio	2020	Série A	—		—		—		—		—		0	0
Grêmio	2021	Série A	—		—		—		—		—		0	0
Grêmio	Total		5	0	0	0	0	0	0	0	2	0	7	0
Boa Esporte (loan)	2018	Série B	18	1	4 (Note: Appearance(s) in Campeonato Mineiro.)	1	0	0	—		—		22	2
São José-RS (loan)	2019	Série C	15	2	2 (Note: Appearance(s) in Campeonato Gaúcho.)	0	0	0	—		—		17	2
Cruzeiro (loan)	2020	Série B	29	2	6	0	2	0	—		—		37	2
Career total			67	5	12	1	2	0	0	0	2	0	83	6

== Honours ==
Grêmio

- Copa do Brasil: 2016
- Copa CONMEBOL Libertadores: 2017
- CONMEBOL Recopa Sudamericana: 2018
