= Caio Rosa =

Brazilian footballer (born 2001)

Personal information
- Full name: Caio Rosa Alves
- Date of birth: 9 March 2001 (age 25)
- Place of birth: Barra Mansa, Brazil
- Height: 1.74 m (5 ft 9 in)
- Position: Forward

Youth career
- Cruzeiro

Senior career*
Years	Team	Apps	(Gls)
2020	Cruzeiro	4	(0)
2020–2023	Al-Sharjah	1	(1)
2021	→ Khor Fakkan (loan)	1	(0)
2022–2023	→ Dibba Al-Hisn (loan)		
2023–2024	Al-Hamriyah		
2025	Alverca	0	(0)
- * Club domestic league appearances and goals as of 16 May 2025

Caio Rosa Alves, known as Caio Rosa (born 9 March 2001) is a Brazilian footballer who plays as a forward.

== Career ==
=== Cruzeiro ===
Rosa was promoted to Cruzeiro's senior team after his good performances at the 2020 Copa São Paulo de Futebol Júnior. He made his professional debut on January 29, 2020 coming in the 61st minute of the match against Villa Nova at 2020 Campeonato Mineiro. Due to Cruzeiro's hard financial and administrative situation, which resulted in several coach's change, Rosa was promoted and demoted to youth teams several times along that year. In September, after several good performances at the Campeonato Brasileiro Sub-20, Rosa was definitely promoted to the senior team. On October 1, he debuted at the 2020 Campeonato Brasileiro Série B coming in the 56th minute of the match against Ponte Preta. On October 5, Rosa signed with UAE Pro League's team Sharjah FC for a US$600,000 fee.

== Career statistics ==
=== Club ===
As of 7 March 2020.

Club	Season	League			State league		Cup		Continental		Other		Total	
Club	Season	Division	Apps	Goals	Apps	Goals	Apps	Goals	Apps	Goals	Apps	Goals	Apps	Goals
Cruzeiro	2020	Série B	2	0	2 (Note: Appearances in the Campeonato Mineiro)	0	0	0	0	0	0	0	4	0
Career total			0	0	2	0	0	0	0	0	0	0	2	0
