= Matheus Pereira (footballer, born 2000) =

Brazilian footballer (born 2000)

Personal information
- Full name: Matheus Pereira de Souza
- Date of birth: 21 December 2000 (age 25)
- Place of birth: São Paulo, Brazil
- Height: 1.72 m (5 ft 8 in)
- Position: Left-back

Team information
- Current team: Toronto FC
- Number: 3

Youth career
- 2015–2020: Cruzeiro

Senior career*
Years	Team	Apps	(Gls)
2020–2022	Cruzeiro	57	(1)
2022	→ Guarani (loan)	24	(3)
2022–2024	Vizela	48	(4)
2024–2026	Santa Clara	38	(0)
2026–	Toronto FC	17	(1)
- * Club domestic league appearances and goals as of 03:48, 8 November 2026 (UTC)

Matheus Pereira de Souza (born 21 December 2000) is a Brazilian professional footballer who plays as a left-back for Major League Soccer club Toronto FC.

== Club career ==
Pereira is a youth product of Cruzeiro since 2015. He began his senior career with the club in 2020 originally signing a contract until the end of 2021. On 2 February 2022, he joined Guarani on loan in the Campeonato Brasileiro Série B. On 30 July 2022, he transferred to the Portuguese Primeira Liga club Vizela with a contract until 2025. He made his debut with Vizela in a 2–2 Primeira Liga tie with Boavista on 30 October 2022, scoring his side's first goal in the 6th minute.

In July 2024, following Vizela's relegation to Liga Portugal 2, Pereira joined Primeira Liga side Santa Clara, signing a four-year contract.

On 29 December 2025, Pereira joined Major League Soccer club Toronto FC on a three-year contract, with an option for a further year.

== Career statistics ==
As of match played 7 November 2026

Appearances and goals by club, season and competition
Club	Season	League			State league (Note: Includes Campeonato Mineiro, Campeonato Paulista)		National cup (Note: Includes Copa do Brasil, Taça de Portugal)		League cup (Note: Includes Taça da Liga)		Continental		Total	
Club	Season	Division	Apps	Goals	Apps	Goals	Apps	Goals	Apps	Goals	Apps	Goals	Apps	Goals
Cruzeiro	2020	Série B	25	1	0	0	0	0	—		—		25	1
Cruzeiro	2021	Série B	20	0	12	0	4	0	—		—		36	0
Cruzeiro	Total		45	1	12	0	4	0	—		—		61	1
Guarani (loan)	2022	Série B	15	2	9	1	2	0	—		—		26	3
Vizela	2022–23	Primeira Liga	18	1	—		0	0	3	0	—		21	1
Vizela	2023–24	Primeira Liga	30	3	—		4	1	2	0	—		36	4
Vizela	Total		48	4	—		4	1	5	0	—		57	5
Santa Clara	2024–25	Primeira Liga	28	0	—		3	0	1	0	—		32	0
Santa Clara	2025–26	Primeira Liga	10	0	—		0	0	1	0	6 (Note: Appearances in UEFA Conference League)	0	17	0
Santa Clara	Total		38	0	—		3	0	2	0	6	0	49	0
Toronto FC	2026	MLS	17	1	—		0	0	—		—		17	1
Career total			163	8	21	1	13	1	7	0	6	0	210	10
