= Airton (footballer, born 1999) =

Brazilian footballer

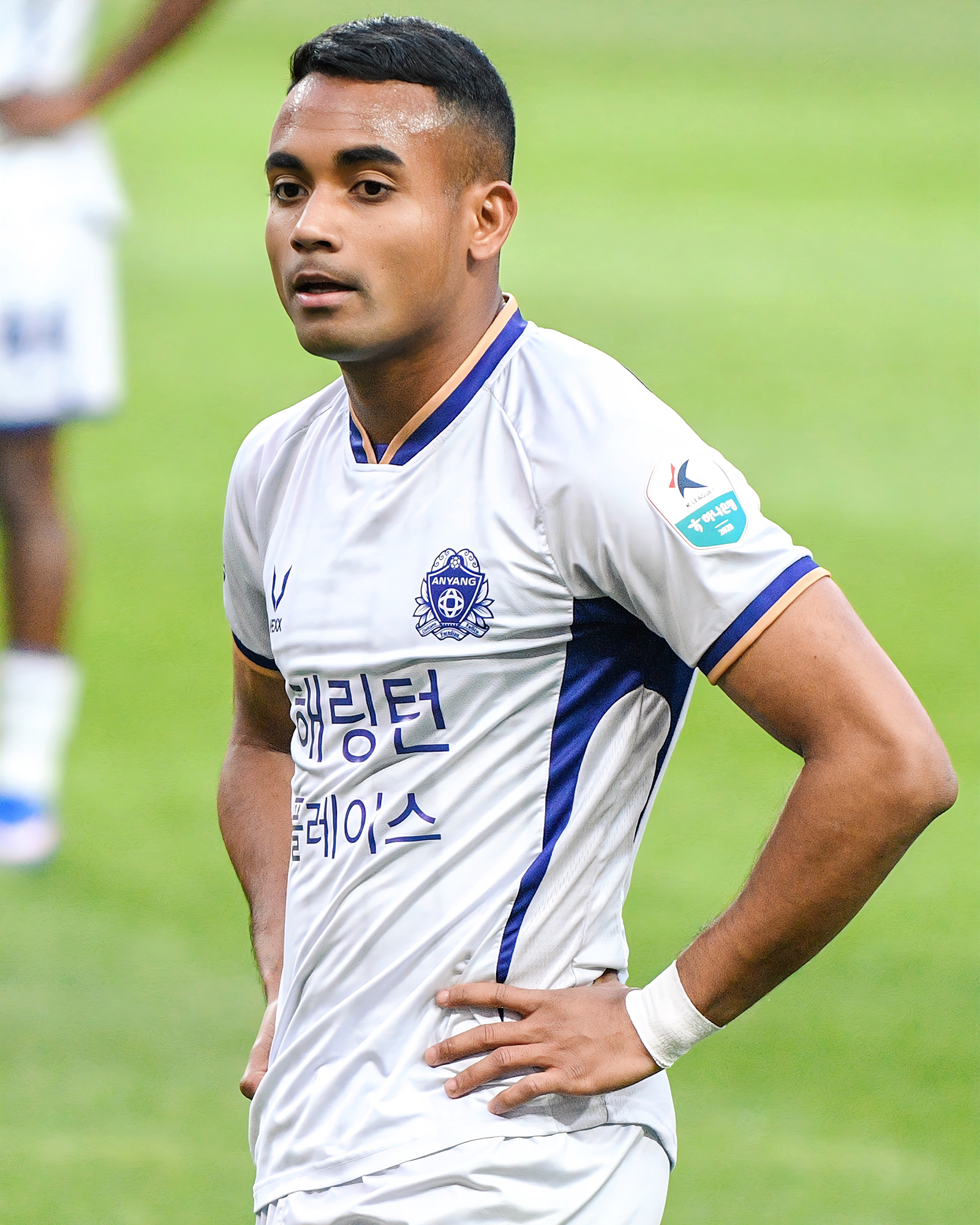
- Airton in 2026

Personal information
- Full name: Airton Moisés Santos Sousa
- Date of birth: 2 February 1999 (age 27)
- Place of birth: Belém, Brazil
- Height: 1.78 m (5 ft 10 in)
- Position: Forward

Team information
- Current team: Anyang
- Number: 11

Youth career
- Paysandu
- Remo
- Desportiva Paraense
- 2016–2019: Palmeiras

Senior career*
Years	Team	Apps	(Gls)
2019	Palmeiras	0	(0)
2019	→ Oeste (loan)	2	(0)
2020	Inter de Limeira	11	(0)
2020–2021	Cruzeiro	52	(6)
2021	→ Ceará (loan)	7	(0)
2022–2024	Atlético Goianiense	90	(7)
2024	→ Guarani (loan)	21	(3)
2025–2026	Novorizontino	27	(1)
2026–	Anyang	13	(5)
- * Club domestic league appearances and goals as of 3 August 2026

Airton Moisés Santos Sousa (born 2 February 1999), known as Airton, is a Brazilian footballer who plays as a forward for K League 1 club Anyang.

== Club career ==
Born in Belém, Pará, Airton joined Palmeiras' youth setup in 2016, after a trial period. On 16 August 2019, after finishing his formation, he was loaned to Série B side Oeste until the end of the season.

Airton made his professional debut on 19 August 2019, coming on as a second-half substitute for Betinho in a 0–2 home loss against Coritiba. On 12 December, after just one further appearance, he rescinded with Verdão and signed for Inter de Limeira.

On 20 August 2020, Airton signed a three-and-a-half-year contract with Cruzeiro in the second division. He scored his first professional goal on 25 October, netting the equalizer in a 1–1 draw at Náutico.

On 23 July 2021, Airton agreed to a loan deal with Série A side Ceará until December. He made his top tier debut two days later, replacing Rick in a 0–0 away draw against Sport Recife.

== Career statistics ==
As of 3 November 2023

Club	Season	League			State League		Cup		Continental		Other		Total	
Club	Season	Division	Apps	Goals	Apps	Goals	Apps	Goals	Apps	Goals	Apps	Goals	Apps	Goals
Oeste	2019	Série B	2	0	—		—		—		—		2	0
Inter de Limeira	2020	Paulista	—		11	0	—		—		—		11	0
Cruzeiro	2020	Série B	30	4	—		1	0	—		—		31	4
Cruzeiro	2021	Série B	9	1	13	1	4	0	—		—		26	2
Cruzeiro	Total		39	5	13	1	5	0	—		—		57	6
Ceará	2021	Série A	7	0	—		—		—		—		7	0
Atlético Goianiense	2022	Série A	33	2	7	0	8	1	8 (Note: Appearance(s) in Copa Sudamericana)	1	—		56	4
Atlético Goianiense	2023	Série B	26	0	16	5	2	0	—		—		44	5
Atlético Goianiense	Total		59	2	23	5	10	1	8	1	—		100	9
Career total			107	7	36	6	15	1	8	1	0	0	166	15

== Honours ==
Atlético Goianiense

- Campeonato Goiano: 2022, 2023
