= João Lucas (footballer, born 1991) =

Brazilian footballer

Personal information
- Full name: João Lucas de Souza Cardoso
- Date of birth: 8 June 1991 (age 35)
- Place of birth: Bela Vista do Paraíso, Brazil
- Height: 1.84 m (6 ft 0 in)
- Position: Left back

Team information
- Current team: Sergipe

Youth career
- Junior Team
- 2009: → Santo André (loan)

Senior career*
Years	Team	Apps	(Gls)
2008–2010	Junior Team		
2008	→ Arapongas (loan)		
2010	→ SE Patrocinense (loan)		
2011	Santo André	2	(0)
2012	SE Patrocinense	7	(0)
2013	Marília	22	(0)
2013–2014	Linense	11	(0)
2014	Atlético Goianiense	5	(0)
2015	Penapolense	12	(0)
2015	Paysandu	37	(0)
2016	Chapecoense	0	(0)
2016	Paysandu	22	(1)
2017	Novorizotino	13	(0)
2017	Ponte Preta	10	(0)
2017–2018	Figueirense	31	(0)
2018–2019	Ceará	53	(1)
2020–2021	Cruzeiro	12	(0)
2020–2021	→ Avaí (loan)	55	(2)
2022	Ferroviária	9	(0)
2022	Náutico	21	(0)
2023	Vitória	4	(0)
2023–2024	América de Natal	23	(0)
2025	Paraná	7	(0)
2025	Retrô	10	(0)
2026	Pantanal	8	(1)
2026–	Sergipe	11	(0)
- * Club domestic league appearances and goals as of 22 May 2024

João Lucas de Souza Cardoso (born 8 June 1991), known as João Lucas, is a Brazilian footballer who plays as a full-back for Sergipe.

== Career statistics ==
As of 28 November 2019

Club	Season	League			State League		Cup		Conmebol		Other		Total	
Club	Season	Division	Apps	Goals	Apps	Goals	Apps	Goals	Apps	Goals	Apps	Goals	Apps	Goals
Santo André	2011	Série C	2	0	—		—		—		—		2	0
SE Patrocinense	2012	Módulo II	—		7	0	—		—		—		7	0
Marília	2013	Paulista A3	—		22	0	—		—		—		22	0
Linense	2013	Paulista	—		—		—		—		6 (Note: All appearance(s) in Copa Paulista)	1	6	1
Linense	2014	Paulista	—		11	0	—		—		—		11	0
Linense	Subtotal		—		11	0	—		—		6	1	17	1
Atlético Goianiense	2014	Série B	5	0	—		2	0	—		—		7	0
Penapolense	2015	Paulista	—		12	0	—		—		—		12	0
Paysandu	2015	Série B	37	0	—		6	0	—		—		43	0
Chapecoense	2016	Série A	—		0	0	2	0	—		—		2	0
Paysandu	2016	Série B	22	1	—		—		—		—		22	1
Novorizontino	2017	Paulista	—		1	0	—		—		—		1	0
Ponte Preta	2017	Série A	10	0	—		—		—		—		10	0
Figueirense	2017	Série B	16	0	—		—		—		—		16	0
Figueirense	2018	Série B	2	0	13	0	1	1	—		—		16	1
Figueirense	Subtotal		18	0	13	0	1	1	—		—		32	1
Ceará	2018	Série A	15	0	—		—		—		—		15	0
Ceará	2019	Série A	30	1	6	0	2	0	—		4 (Note: All appearance(s) in Copa do Nordeste)	0	42	1
Ceará	Subtotal		45	1	6	0	2	0	—		4	0	57	1
Career total			139	2	72	0	13	1	0	0	10	1	234	4

== Honours ==
Avaí

- Campeonato Catarinense: 2021
