= Patrick Brey =

Brazilian footballer

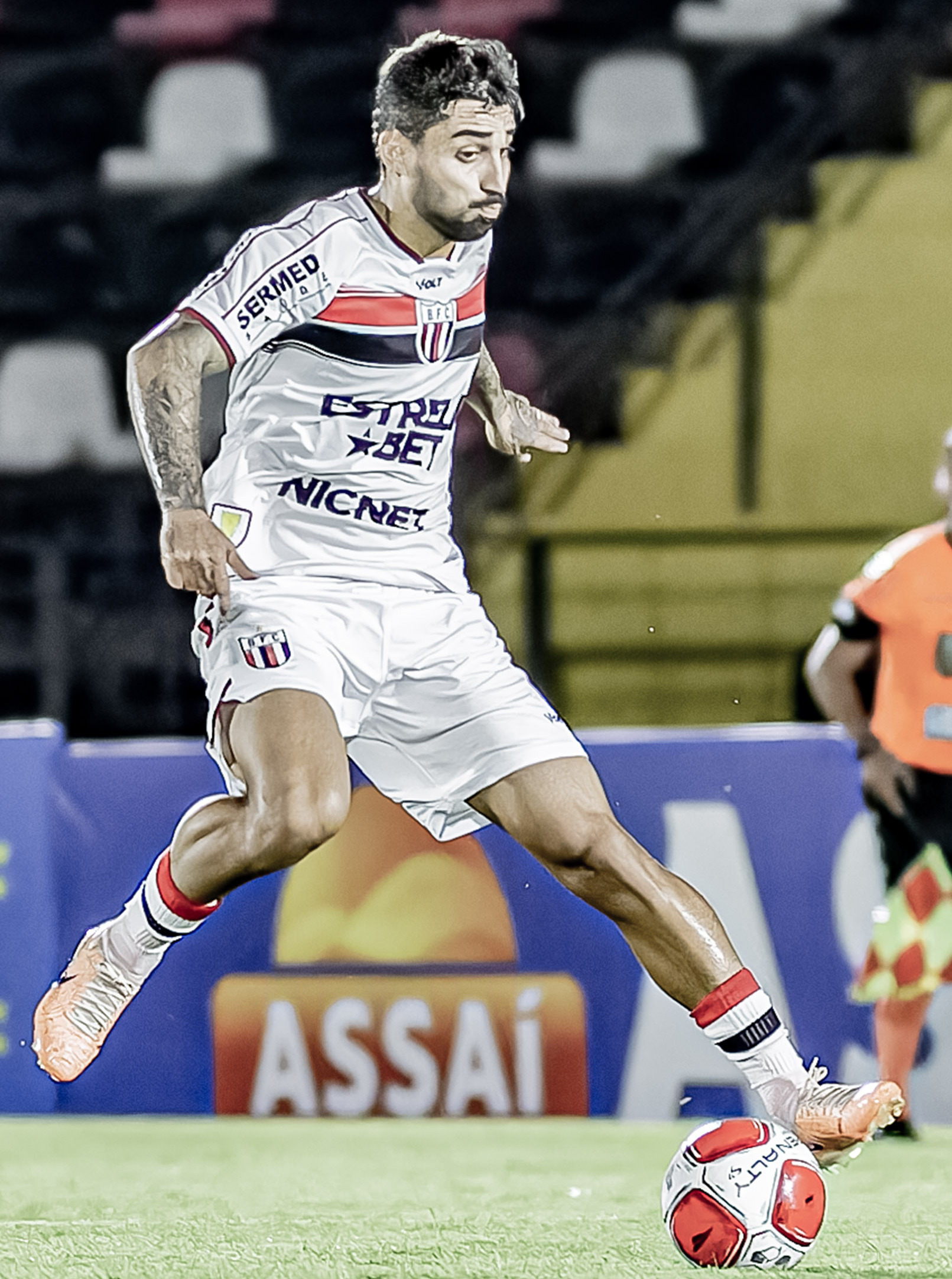
- Patrick Brey with Botafogo-SP in 2024

Personal information
- Full name: Patrick de Carvalho Brey
- Date of birth: 5 June 1997 (age 29)
- Place of birth: Brasília, Brazil
- Height: 1.77 m (5 ft 10 in)
- Position: Left-back

Team information
- Current team: Botafogo-SP

Youth career
- Vila Nova

Senior career*
Years	Team	Apps	(Gls)
2015–2017	Vila Nova	30	(0)
2017	→ Goiânia (loan)	0	(0)
2017–2018	Tupi	12	(1)
2018–2020	Cruzeiro	23	(0)
2019	→ Coritiba (loan)	24	(0)
2020	→ Ferroviária (loan)	8	(0)
2021	CSA	1	(0)
2021–2022	Triestina	3	(0)
2022	→ Paysandu (loan)	12	(1)
2022–2023	Paysandu	12	(0)
2023	→ Água Santa (loan)	6	(0)
2023–2024	Água Santa	0	(0)
2023	→ Botafogo-SP (loan)	30	(1)
2024	Botafogo-SP	43	(3)
2025	Novorizontino	23	(0)
2026–	Botafogo-SP	37	(6)
- * Club domestic league appearances and goals as of 18 November 2026

Patrick de Carvalho Brey (born 5 June 1997), simply known as Patrick Brey, is a Brazilian professional footballer who plays as a left-back for Brazilian club Botafogo-SP.

== Career ==
Brey started his career at Vila Nova in Goiás where he played for three seasons. With the club, Brey won the 2015 Campeonato Brasileiro Série C and was the runners-up of the 2017 Campeonato Goiano. He had a loan spell with Goiânia in the second half of 2017, competing in the second division of Campeonato Goiano. In December 2017, he moved to Tupi to play the 2018 Campeonato Mineiro. Brey and his club reached the championship's semi-final being defeated (and consequently eliminated) by Cruzeiro for 3–1. Due to his highly praised performances in the Campeonato Mineiro, he signed with Cruzeiro itself on 10 April 2018.

On 13 June 2018, Brey debuted for Cruzeiro in a 1–1 draw against Paraná Clube. He came on in the 57th minute replacing the midfielder Federico Mancuello. In this particular match, Brey played as a left midfielder (which is not his original position) and performed well drawing a penalty that led Cruzeiro to tie the match. Since then, he has been used by coach Mano Menezes mostly as a midfielder.

On 1 February 2019, he was presented by Coritiba, having signed on loan for the 2019 season.

On 8 October 2021, he joined Triestina in the Italian third-tier Serie C.

== Career statistics ==
As of match played 8 June 2019

Appearances and goals by club, season and competition
Club	Season	League			State League		Copa do Brasil		Continental		Other		Total	
Club	Season	Division	Apps	Goals	Apps	Goals	Apps	Goals	Apps	Goals	Apps	Goals	Apps	Goals
Vila Nova	2015	Série C	9	0	—		—		—		—		9	0
Vila Nova	2016	Série B	5	0	5	0	4	0	—		—		14	0
Vila Nova	2017	Série B	0	0	7	0	0	0	—		—		7	0
Vila Nova	Total		14	0	12	0	4	0	0	0	0	0	30	0
Goiânia (loan)	2017	Goiano 2	—		4	0	—		—		—		4	0
Tupi	2018	Mineiro	—		12	1	—		—		—		12	1
Cruzeiro	2018	Série A	6	0	0	0	0	0	0	0	—		6	0
Coritiba (loan)	2019	Série B	7	0	7	0	0	0	—		—		14	0
Career total			27	0	35	1	4	0	0	0	0	0	66	1

== Honours ==
Vila Nova

- Campeonato Brasileiro Série C: 2015
- Campeonato Goiano Second Division: 2015

Tupi

- Campeonato Mineiro Interior: 2018

Cruzeiro

- Copa do Brasil: 2018

CSA

- Campeonato Alagoano: 2021

Paysandu

- Copa Verde: 2022
