= Botafogo Futebol Clube (PB) =

Brazilian association football club based in João Pessoa, Paraíba, Brazil

Botafogo-PB
- Full name: Botafogo Futebol Clube
- Nicknames: Belo (Beautiful); Alvinegro da Estrela Vermelha (White and Black of the Red Star); Xerifão do Nordeste (Northeast's Big Sheriff); Tricolor da Maravilha do Contorno (Threecolour of the Wonder Contour)
- Founded: 28 September 1931; 95 years ago
- Ground: Almeidão
- Capacity: 25,770
- President: Filipe Félix
- Head coach: Marcelo Fernandes
- League: Campeonato Brasileiro Série C Campeonato Paraibano
- 2025 2025: Série C, 13th of 20; Paraibano, 2nd of 10
- Website: botafogopb.com.br
Home colors	Away colors	Third colors

Botafogo Futebol Clube, commonly referred to as Botafogo da Paraíba, Botafogo-PB or simply Botafogo is a Brazilian professional club based in João Pessoa, Paraíba founded on 28 September 1931.

Botafogo is the top ranked team from Paraíba in CBF's national club ranking, at 51st overall.

== History ==
On September 28, 1931, the club was founded at Centro de João Pessoa, João Pessoa city, by Beraldo de Oliveira, Manoel Feitosa, Livonete Pessoa, José de Melo, Edson de Moura Machado and Enock Lins, all of them Botafogo of Rio de Janeiro supporters. Beraldo de Oliveira was chosen as the club's first president.

In 1932, Botafogo played its first match, against São Bento. The Liga Suburbana match ended in a 2–2 draw.

In 1936, Botafogo won its first professional title, the Paraíba state championship.

In 1976, the club disputed the Campeonato Brasileiro Série A for the first time. Botafogo was eliminated in the second round, and finished in 25th position.

In 1985, Botafogo finished 19th in the Campeonato Brasileiro Série A, which is the club's all-time best position in the competition.

In 1989, Botafogo disputed Copa do Brasil's first edition. The team was knocked out in the first round by Cruzeiro, after two draws, on the away goals rule (the first leg, in João Pessoa was 1–1, and the second leg, in Belo Horizonte, ended 0–0).

The 2011 season saw Botafogo, for the first time in their history, the club advanced to the Copa do Brasil's second round after beating Vitória 3–1 on aggregate. Belo was knocked out in the second round by Caxias, after losing 4–1 on aggregate. Botafogo's first national title is the Série D, which was won in 2013, when they beat Juventude in the final.

== Stadium ==
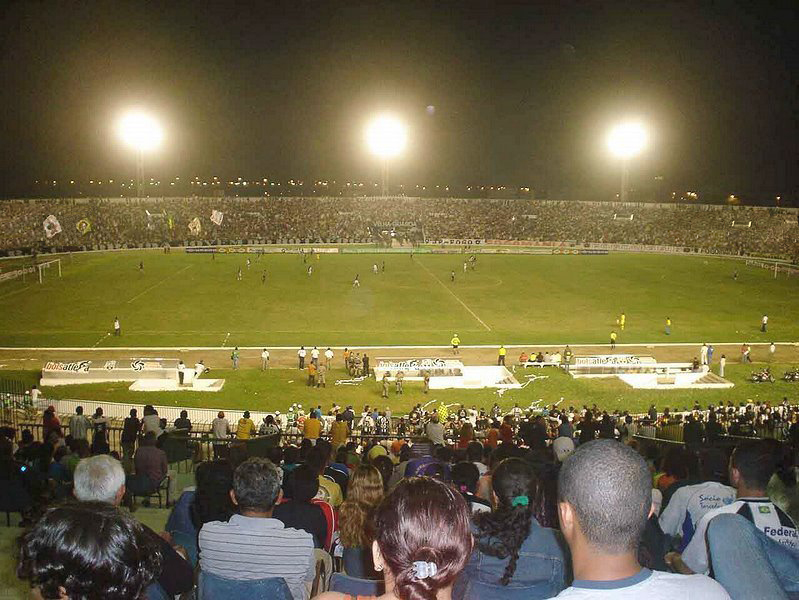
Estádio José Américo de Almeida Filho

Botafogo's home matches are usually played at Almeidão stadium, which has a maximum capacity of 40,000 people. Its official name is Estádio José Américo de Almeida Filho.

The club also owns a training ground named CT Maravilha do Contorno. The total training ground area is 10 ha.

== Rivals ==
Botafogo's most important rivals are Treze, Campinense and Auto Esporte. The João Pessoa derby between Botafogo and Auto Esporte is commonly known as Botauto.

== Current squad ==
As of 19 November 2026

Note: Flags indicate national team as defined under FIFA eligibility rules; some limited exceptions apply. Players may hold more than one non-FIFA nationality.

No.	Pos.	Nation	Player
2	DF	BRA	Diogo Mateus
3	DF	BRA	Yan Souto
4	DF	BRA	Saimon Tormen
5	MF	BRA	Jhonata Varela
6	DF	BRA	Patric Calmon
7	FW	BRA	Dudu Hatamoto
8	MF	BRA	Igor Maduro
10	MF	BRA	Nenê
11	DF	BRA	Diego Tavares
14	DF	BRA	Igor Morais
15	FW	BRA	Kayon (on loan from Náutico)
16	DF	BRA	Bull
17	FW	BRA	Jonas Toró (on loan from Portuguesa)
18	MF	BRA	Giovanni Piccolomo
19	FW	BRA	Gustavo Balotelli (on loan from Vegalta Sendai)
20	MF	BRA	Thallyson
21	GK	BRA	Leandro Nink

No.	Pos.	Nation	Player
22	DF	BRA	Léo Pereira (on loan from Água Santa)
23	GK	BRA	Max Walef
25	MF	BRA	Caio Garcia
27	GK	BRA	Luiz Daniel
28	MF	BRA	Lucas Cândido
30	FW	BRA	Lucas Matheus
32	MF	BRA	Gustavo
33	DF	BRA	Júlio Vaz
34	GK	BRA	Edilson
35	DF	BRA	Dhônata
37	MF	BRA	Ed Carlos
47	MF	BRA	Riquelmo
77	FW	BRA	Rodolfo
84	GK	BRA	Deivid Andrade (on loan from Retrô)
—	DF	BRA	Lucas Sena
—	FW	BRA	Felipe Azevedo

=== Out on loan ===
Note: Flags indicate national team as defined under FIFA eligibility rules; some limited exceptions apply. Players may hold more than one non-FIFA nationality.

No.	Pos.	Nation	Player
—	DF	BRA	Erick (on loan from Serra Branca until 6 December 2026)

== Other sports ==
Besides football, Botafogo also has other sports sections, such as futsal and basketball.

== Logo ==
The club's logo was inspired by Botafogo of Rio de Janeiro one. However, Botafogo da Paraíba's star is red. The star is red because, in 1976, the radio announcer Ivan Tomaz decided that the club's logo should have the same colors of Paraíba state flag, black and red.

== Club colors ==
Botafogo's colors are red, black and white.

== Nickname ==
The club is nicknamed Belo, meaning beautiful in Portuguese. This nickname was created by Antônio de Abreu e Lima, a club's counselor, after the club scored a goal considered very beautiful by him.

== Mascot ==
Botafogo da Paraíba's mascot is a sheriff.

== Honours ==
=== Official tournaments ===
National
Competitions	Titles	Seasons
Campeonato Brasileiro Série D	1	2013
Inter-state
Competitions	Titles	Seasons
Copa Paraíba-Pernambuco	2	1953, 1967
Copa Rio Grande do Norte-Paraíba	2	1954, 1964
State
Competitions	Titles	Seasons
Campeonato Paraibano	31	1936, 1937, 1938, 1944, 1945, 1947, 1948, 1949, 1953, 1954, 1955, 1957, 1968, 1969, 1970, 1975, 1976, 1977, 1978, 1984, 1986, 1988, 1998, 1999, 2003, 2013, 2014, 2017, 2018, 2019, 2026
Copa Paraíba	1^{s}	2010
Taça ACEP	1	1981
Taça Mané Garrincha	1	1983
City
Competitions	Titles	Seasons
Taça Cidade de João Pessoa	1	1966

- record
- ^{s} shared record

=== Others tournaments ===
==== State ====
- Torneio Início da Paraíba (15): 1937, 1940, 1941, 1946, 1949, 1960, 1961, 1962, 1967, 1970, 1978, 1981, 1989, 1991, 1992

=== Runners-up ===
- Copa do Nordeste (1): 2019
- Campeonato Paraibano (22): 1935, 1940, 1950, 1952, 1956, 1965, 1971, 1979, 1980, 1987, 1996, 1997, 2000, 2001, 2002, 2006, 2010, 2015, 2016, 2022, 2024, 2025
- Copa Paraíba (3): 2006, 2009, 2012

=== Women's Football ===
- Campeonato Paraibano de Futebol Feminino (6): 2011, 2015, 2016, 2017, 2018, 2020
