= Vinícius Popó =

Brazilian association football player

Vinicius Popó
Personal information
- Full name: Vinicius Santana da Silva
- Date of birth: 25 February 2001 (age 25)
- Place of birth: São José do Rio Preto, Brazil
- Height: 1.79 m (5 ft 10 in)
- Position: Striker

Team information
- Current team: Capivariano

Youth career
- 2014–2019: Cruzeiro

Senior career*
Years	Team	Apps	(Gls)
2019–2021	Cruzeiro	8	(0)
2020–2021	→ Sport Recife (loan)	2	(1)
2021	→ Goiás (loan)	5	(1)
2022	Azuriz	2	(0)
2022	→ Betim (loan)	8	(0)
2022	→ Fortaleza (loan)	4	(4)
2023–	Capivariano	68	(34)
2023	→ Operario Ferroviário (loan)	13	(3)
2024	→ CSA (loan)	12	(1)
2024	→ Hercílio Luz (loan)	6	(2)
2025	→ Ituano (loan)	18	(4)
2025	→ Joinville EC (loan)	11	(3)
2026	→ Barra-SC (loan)	7	(0)

International career
2016	Brazil U15	0	(0)
- * Club domestic league appearances and goals as of 11 November 2026

Vinicius Santana da Silva (born 25 February 2001), known as Vinicius Popó, is a Brazilian footballer who plays as a striker for Capivariano.

== Life and career ==
Born in São José do Rio Preto, Vinicius Popó joined Cruzeiro at 13 years-old in May 2014. In a few time, he established himself as prolific goal scorer playing for Cruzeiro's U17 and U20 teams. Due to his good performances, he soon started to be considered a promising player and, as a result, the club signed him a professional contract with a R$ 330 million termination fee. In January 2019, Popó scored five goals in seven matches for the Cruzeiro U20 at the Copa São Paulo de Futebol Júnior. Due to his performance at this championship, Cruzeiro's coach Mano Menezes promoted him to the senior team and listed him in the squad available to play the Copa Libertadores. On 10 March 2019 Popó made his professional debut when he came in the 75th minute of the match against Tombense, replacing Sassá. On 20 July 2019 Popó debuted in the Campeonato Brasileiro when he replaced Sassá at the 74th minute of the match against Bahia.

Capivariano

In January 2023, he was announced by Capivariano as a reinforcement to compete in the Série A3 of the same year, Popó was a key player in two promotions for the Capivariano team, one in 2023 when he was champion of the Campeonato Paulista Série A3 and another in 2025 winning the Campeonato Paulista Série A2 being a natural goalscorer scoring 33 goals in 59 games for the team from Capivari.

Operário

In May 2023, Operario Ferroviário announced Popó on loan to compete in the Série C, the duration of the loan was 1 year.

CSA

In November 2023, the CSA team announced Popó on loan to reinforce the squad for 2024.

Hercílio Luz

In September 2024, Hercílio Luz announced Popó on loan to compete in the Copa Santa Catarina.

Ituano

In April 2025, he was announced Ituano on loan until the end of the same year to compete in the Série C.

Joinville

In September 2025, Joinville has confirmed the signing of 24-year-old forward Vinícius Popó for the Copa Santa Catarina. The player arrives on loan from Capivariano, with a contract valid until the end of the tournament.

== Honours ==
Cruzeiro

- Campeonato Mineiro : 2019

Capivariano

- Campeonato Paulista Série A2 : 2025
- Campeonato Paulista Série A3 : 2023

CSA

- Copa Alagoas : 2024

Goias U20

- Campeonato Goiano Sub-20: 2021
