= Riquelmo =

Brazilian footballer

Personal information
- Full name: Riquelmo Alves Lima
- Date of birth: 19 March 2002 (age 24)
- Place of birth: Piumhi, Brasil
- Height: 1.70 m (5 ft 7 in)
- Position: Forward

Team information
- Current team: Botafogo-PB

Senior career*
Years	Team	Apps	(Gls)
2020–2022	Cruzeiro	2	(0)
2022–2025	Fortaleza	0	(0)
2023	→ Confiança (loan)	13	(2)
2023	→ Sampaio Corrêa (loan)	6	(0)
2024	→ Volta Redonda (loan)	5	(0)
2024	→ Confiança (loan)	11	(0)
2025	→ Ouvidorense (loan)	9	(1)
2025–	Botafogo-PB	5	(0)
2026	→ CRAC (loan)	12	(1)
- * Club domestic league appearances and goals as of 8 November 2026

Riquelmo Alves Lima (born 19 March 2002), commonly known as Riquelmo, is a Brazilian footballer who plays as a forward for Botafogo-PB].

== Career statistics ==
=== Club ===
As of 13 August 2020.

Club	Season	League			State League		Cup		Other		Total	
Club	Season	Division	Apps	Goals	Apps	Goals	Apps	Goals	Apps	Goals	Apps	Goals
Cruzeiro	2020	Série B	1	0	0	0	0	0	0	0	1	0
Career total			1	0	0	0	0	0	0	0	1	0
