= Lucas Nathan =

Brazilian footballer (born 1998)

Personal information
- Full name: Lucas Nathan Veloso
- Date of birth: 17 November 1998 (age 27)
- Place of birth: Jundiaí, Brazil
- Height: 1.85 m (6 ft 1 in)
- Position: Attacking midfielder

Team information
- Current team: Botafogo-SP

Youth career
- 2013–2014: SEV Hortolândia
- 2015–2017: Bragantino
- 2017–2018: Red Bull Brasil

Senior career*
Years	Team	Apps	(Gls)
2018	Red Bull Brasil	0	(0)
2019	Grêmio Osasco	6	(0)
2019–2023	Caldense	25	(4)
2021	→ Coritiba (loan)	3	(0)
2021–2022	→ Ituano (loan)	34	(3)
2023	→ Portuguesa (loan)	11	(1)
2023	Ponte Preta	6	(1)
2024	Pouso Alegre	8	(1)
2025	Bangu	10	(0)
2025–	Botafogo-SP	0	(0)
- * Club domestic league appearances and goals as of 18 December 2025

Lucas Nathan Veloso (born 17 November 1998), known as Lucas Nathan or just Nathan, is a Brazilian footballer who plays as an attacking midfielder for Botafogo-SP.

== Club career ==
Born in Jundiaí, São Paulo, Lucas Nathan represented SEV Hortolândia, Bragantino and Red Bull Brasil as a youth. He made his senior debut with the latter in the 2018 Copa Paulista, scoring once in ten appearances.

Lucas Nathan moved to Grêmio Osasco ahead of the 2019 season, but was presented at Caldense on 4 April of that year. Despite spending the 2019 Série D without a single appearance, he became a regular starter in the 2020 campaign.

On 3 March 2021, Lucas Nathan joined Coritiba on loan until the end of the year, with a buyout clause. On 7 July, after being rarely used, he moved to Ituano also in a temporary deal, and helped the club in their 2021 Série C winning campaign.

On 2 December 2022, still owned by Caldense, Lucas Nathan was announced at Portuguesa.

== Career statistics ==
As of 17 March 2023

Club	Season	League			State League		Cup		Continental		Other		Total	
Club	Season	Division	Apps	Goals	Apps	Goals	Apps	Goals	Apps	Goals	Apps	Goals	Apps	Goals
Red Bull Brasil	2018	Paulista	—		0	0	—		—		10 (Note: Appearance(s) in Copa Paulista)	1	10	1
Grêmio Osasco	2019	Paulista A3	—		6	0	—		—		—		6	0
Caldense	2019	Série D	0	0	—		—		—		—		0	0
Caldense	2020	Série D	12	0	13	4	—		—		—		25	4
Caldense	Total		12	0	13	4	—		—		—		25	4
Coritiba	2021	Série B	1	0	2	0	0	0	—		—		3	0
Ituano	2021	Série C	11	2	—		—		—		—		11	2
Ituano	2022	Série B	14	1	9	0	—		—		—		23	1
Ituano	Total		25	3	9	0	—		—		—		34	3
Portuguesa	2023	Paulista	—		11	1	—		—		—		11	1
Career total			38	3	41	5	0	0	0	0	10	1	89	9

== Honours ==
=== Club ===
Ituano

- Campeonato Brasileiro Série C: 2021
