= Marco Antônio (footballer, born July 2000) =

Brazilian footballer

Personal information
- Full name: Marco Antônio de Oliveira Coelho
- Date of birth: 15 July 2000 (age 26)
- Place of birth: Belo Horizonte, Brazil
- Height: 1.82 m (6 ft 0 in)
- Position: Midfielder

Team information
- Current team: Primavera

Youth career
- 2017–2020: Cruzeiro

Senior career*
Years	Team	Apps	(Gls)
2020–2022	Cruzeiro	23	(0)
2022	Goiás	0	(0)
2023–2024	Operário	31	(1)
2025	Betim	5	(0)
2025	Floresta	6	(0)
2025–2026	PVF-CAND	8	(0)
2026–	Primavera	0	(0)

International career
2015	Brazil U15	1	(1)
2015–2016	Brazil U17	5	(2)
- * Club domestic league appearances and goals as of 12 August 2026

Marco Antônio de Oliveira Coelho (born 15 July 2000), commonly known as Marco Antônio, is a Brazilian professional footballer who plays as a midfielder for Primavera.

== Club career ==
In August 2025, Antônio moved to Vietnam, signing for V.League 1 side PVF-CAND.

== International career ==
Antônio had represented Brazil at U-15 and U-17 level.

== Career statistics ==
=== Club ===
As of 12 August 2026

Club	Season	League			State league		Cup		Continental		Other		Total	
Club	Season	Division	Apps	Goals	Apps	Goals	Apps	Goals	Apps	Goals	Apps	Goals	Apps	Goals
Cruzeiro	2020	Série A	0	0	5	0	2	0	—		0	0	7	0
Cruzeiro	2021	Série B	10	0	1	0	0	0	—		0	0	11	0
Cruzeiro	2022	Série B	0	0	5	0	0	0	—		0	0	5	0
Cruzeiro	Total		10	0	11	0	2	0	0	0	0	0	23	0
Operário Ferroviário	2023	Série C	6	0	8	0	0	0	—		0	0	14	0
Operário Ferroviário	2024	Série B	11	1	5	0	1	0	—		0	0	17	1
Operário Ferroviário	Total		17	1	13	0	1	0	0	0	0	0	31	1
Betim	2025	Campeonato Mineiro	0	0	5	0	0	0	—		0	0	5	0
Floresta-CE	2025	Série C	6	0	0	0	0	0	—		0	0	6	0
PVF-CAND	2025–26	V.League 1	8	0	0	0	0	0	—		0	0	8	0
Primavera	2026	Campeonato Paulista	0	0	0	0	0	0	—		4 (Note: appearances in Copa Paulista)	3	4	3
Career total			41	1	29	0	3	0	0	0	4	3	77	4
