= Zé Eduardo (footballer, born 1999) =

Brazilian footballer

Personal information
- Full name: José Eduardo de Andrade
- Date of birth: 8 July 1999 (age 27)
- Place of birth: Natal, Brazil
- Height: 1.78 m (5 ft 10 in)
- Position: Forward

Team information
- Current team: Varzim
- Number: 90

Youth career
- –2018: América-RN
- 2018–2019: Visão Celeste
- 2019–2020: Cruzeiro

Senior career*
Years	Team	Apps	(Gls)
2018–2019	Visão Celeste	3	(0)
2020–2022	Cruzeiro	0	(0)
2020	→ Villa Nova-MG (loan)	5	(4)
2020	→ América-RN (loan)	26	(5)
2022	Leixões	13	(2)
2023–	Varzim	0	(0)
- * Club domestic league appearances and goals as of 4 December 2022

José Eduardo de Andrade (born 8 July 1999), commonly known as Zé Eduardo, is a Brazilian footballer who plays for Portuguese club Varzim, as a forward.

== Career statistics ==
=== Club ===
As of 7 June 2020.

Club	Season	League			State league		Cup		Continental		Other		Total	
Club	Season	Division	Apps	Goals	Apps	Goals	Apps	Goals	Apps	Goals	Apps	Goals	Apps	Goals
Visão Celeste	2018	–			3 (Note: Appearances in the Campeonato Potiguar Second Division)	0	0	0	0	0	0	0	3	0
Cruzeiro	2020	Série A	0	0	0	0	0	0	0	0	0	0	0	0
Villa Nova-MG (loan)	2020	Série D	0	0	5 (Note: Appearances in the Campeonato Mineiro)	4	0	0	0	0	0	0	5	4
Career total			0	0	8	4	0	0	0	0	0	0	8	4
