= Giovanni Palmieri (footballer) =

Brazilian footballer (born 1989)

Personal information
- Full name: Giovanni Palmieri dos Santos
- Date of birth: 23 June 1989 (age 37)
- Place of birth: Santos, Brazil
- Height: 1.82 m (6 ft 0 in)
- Position: Left back

Youth career
- Noroeste

Senior career*
Years	Team	Apps	(Gls)
2010–2012	Noroeste	12	(1)
2012–2013	Botafogo-SP	7	(1)
2013	Guaratinguetá	9	(1)
2014	Botafogo-SP	13	(0)
2014–2015	Penapolense	0	(0)
2014–2015	→ Criciúma (loan)	29	(0)
2015	→ Fluminense (loan)	27	(1)
2015–2018	Fluminense	27	(0)
2017	→ Náutico (loan)	13	(1)
2017–2018	→ América Mineiro (loan)	52	(7)
2019	Ponte Preta	10	(0)
2019–2020	Bahia	10	(0)
2020	Cruzeiro	8	(1)
2021	Santo André	4	(0)
2022	Portuguesa Santista	11	(0)
2023	Grêmio Prudente	12	(0)
- * Club domestic league appearances and goals as of 29 April 2023

Giovanni Palmieri dos Santos (born 23 June 1989), sometimes known as just Giovanni, is a Brazilian professional footballer who plays mainly as a left back.

His younger brother, Emerson, is also a footballer.

== Honours ==
Fluminense

- Primeira Liga: 2016

América Mineiro

- Campeonato Brasileiro Série B: 2017
