= Treze de Maio =

Coordinates: 28.5589°S 49.1478°W

- Municipality
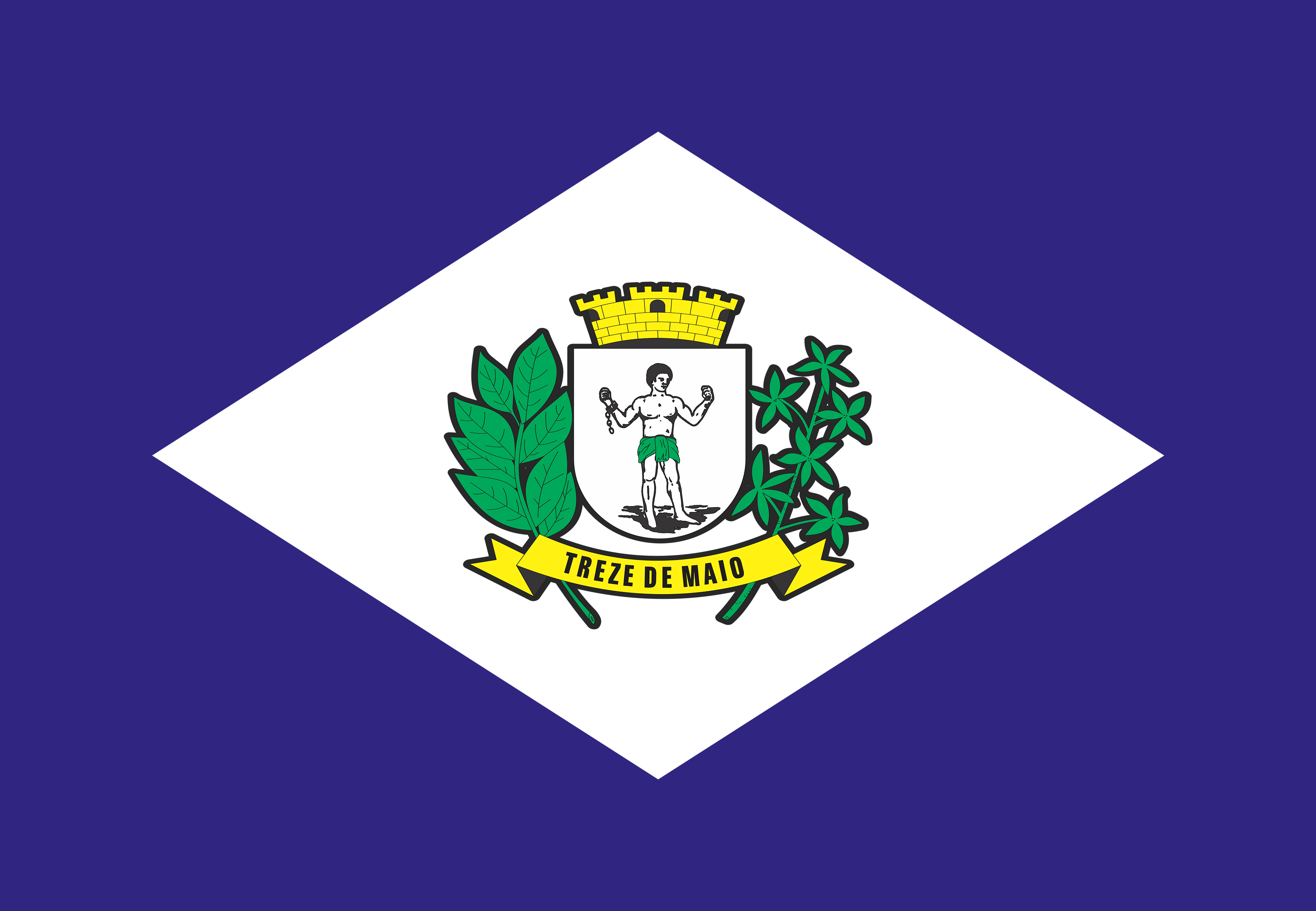
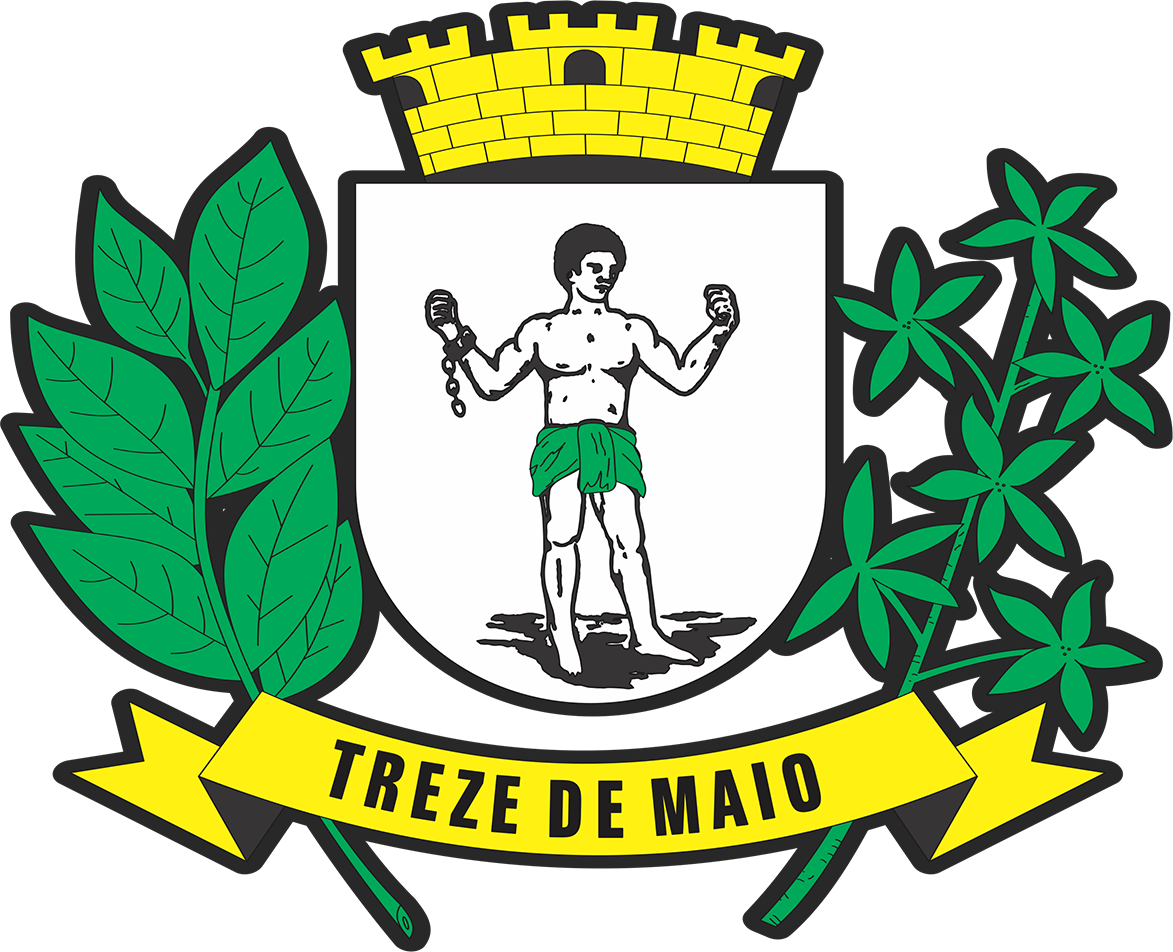
- Flag Coat of arms
- Interactive map of Treze de Maio
- Country: Brazil
- Region: South
- State: Santa Catarina
- Mesoregion: Sul Catarinense

Population (2020)
  - Total: 7,093
- Time zone: UTC -3

Treze de Maio is a municipality in the state of Santa Catarina in the South region of Brazil.

== See also ==
- List of municipalities in Santa Catarina
