= 2015 Clube do Remo season =

2015 season of Brazilian association football team

Remo
2015 season
- President: Pedro Minowa (Licensed); Manoel Ribeiro
- Coach: Zé Teodoro (until 30 March 2015); Cacaio
- Stadium: Mangueirão
- Campeonato Brasileiro Série D: 3rd (promoted)
- Campeonato Paraense: 1st
- Copa Verde: Runners-up
- Copa do Brasil: First round
- Highest home attendance: 34,780 (vs. Cuiabá, 30 April 2015)
- Lowest home attendance: 905 (vs. Nacional, 22 August 2015)
Home colors	Away colors

The 2015 season was Remo's 102nd existence. The club participated in the Campeonato Brasileiro Série D, the Campeonato Paraense, the Copa Verde and the Copa do Brasil.

Remo finished in the 3rd place of the Campeonato Brasileiro Série D, conquering the promotion to the Série C of the following year. Remo also won the Campeonato Paraense, totalizing 44 titles of the championship. In the Copa Verde, the club was runner-up after losing the final by Cuiabá 6-5 on aggregate. In the Copa do Brasil, Remo was eliminated in the first round by Atlético Paranaense, after tied 2-2 on aggregate but lose on penalties by 5-4.

== Players ==
=== Squad information ===
Numbers in parentheses denote appearances as substitute.

As of 1 November 2015

Position	Nat.	Name	Date of Birth (Age)		
Position	Nat.	Name	Date of Birth (Age)	Apps	Goals
GK	BRA	Fernando Henrique	25 November 1983 (aged 31)	14	0
GK	BRA	Fabiano	19 September 1977 (aged 38)	17	0
GK	BRA	César Luz	10 March 1986 (aged 29)	0	0
DF	BRA	Max	7 February 1987 (aged 28)	25	0
DF	BRA	Henrique	8 February 1991 (aged 24)	14	2
DF	BRA	Ciro Sena	8 June 1982 (aged 33)	17	0
DF	BRA	Igor João	23 April 1993 (aged 22)	17 (1)	1
DF	BRA	Yan	5 August 1994 (aged 21)	0 (2)	0
DF	BRA	Levy	22 July 1988 (aged 27)	21 (6)	1
DF	BRA	Gabriel Proença	17 January 1995 (aged 20)	1	0
DF	BRA	Mateus Müller	18 November 1995 (aged 19)	4 (1)	0
DF	BRA	Alex Ruan	5 February 1993 (aged 22)	26	0
DF	BRA	Rodrigo Soares	1 October 1992 (aged 23)	1 (3)	0
MF	BRA	Leandro Santos	9 August 1986 (aged 29)	3 (1)	0
MF	BRA	Felipe Macena	25 July 1993 (aged 22)	9 (12)	1
MF	BRA	Chicão	11 July 1981 (aged 34)	13	2
MF	BRA	Ilaílson	9 April 1985 (aged 30)	22 (4)	0
MF	BRA	Juninho	11 January 1983 (aged 32)	4 (5)	0
MF	BRA	Edicleber	30 October 1993 (aged 22)	3 (1)	1
MF	BRA	Ratinho	30 October 1979 (aged 36)	10 (7)	1
MF	BRA	Eduardo Ramos	25 March 1986 (aged 29)	32	10
FW	BRA	Léo Paraíba	8 August 1988 (aged 27)	5 (7)	2
FW	BRA	Sílvio	11 February 1994 (aged 21)	3 (10)	3
FW	BRA	Aleílson	12 March 1985 (aged 30)	7 (4)	1
FW	BRA	Welthon	21 June 1992 (aged 23)	5 (2)	1
FW	BRA	Kiros	21 August 1988 (aged 27)	4	2
FW	BRA	Rafael Paty	15 March 1981 (aged 34)	14 (13)	10
Players left the club during the playing season
GK	BRA	Camilo	6 March 1989 (aged 26)	5	0
DF	BRA	Raphael Andrade	7 September 1982 (aged 32)	3	0
DF	BRA	Cláudio Allax	7 January 1991 (aged 24)	1	0
DF	BRA	George Lucas	20 February 1984 (aged 31)	4 (1)	0
DF	BRA	Jadílson	4 December 1977 (aged 37)	7 (4)	0
MF	BRA	Alberto	21 January 1988 (aged 27)	13 (1)	4
MF	BRA	Warian Santos	14 June 1996 (aged 19)	9	1
MF	BRA	Dadá	2 November 1983 (aged 31)	18	1
MF	BRA	Mateus Carioca	4 January 1993 (aged 22)	1	0
MF	BRA	Fabrício	13 June 1986 (aged 28)	1 (4)	0
MF	BRA	Bismark	12 July 1993 (aged 21)	16 (3)	3
FW	BRA	Rony	11 May 1995 (aged 19)	12 (3)	2
FW	BRA	Flávio Caça-Rato	29 June 1986 (aged 28)	7 (4)	2
FW	BRA	Val Barreto	6 February 1986 (aged 29)	6 (9)	3

=== Top scorers ===
As of 19 October 2015

Place	Position	Name	Campeonato Brasileiro Série D	Campeonato Paraense	Copa Verde	Copa do Brasil	Total
1	FW	Rafael Paty	1	7	2	0	10
1	MF	Eduardo Ramos	5	4	1	0	10
3	MF	Alberto	0	2	2	0	4
4	FW	Sílvio	2	0	1	0	3
4	FW	Val Barreto	0	1	2	0	3
4	MF	Bismark	0	3	0	0	3
7	FW	Kiros	2	0	0	0	2
7	FW	Léo Paraíba	2	0	0	0	2
7	FW	Rony	0	0	2	0	2
7	FW	Flávio Caça-Rato	0	1	1	0	2
7	MF	Chicão	2	0	0	0	2
7	DF	Henrique	2	0	0	0	2
13	FW	Aleílson	1	0	0	0	1
13	FW	Welthon	1	0	0	0	1
13	MF	Ratinho	0	0	1	0	1
13	MF	Edicleber	1	0	0	0	1
13	MF	Felipe Macena	0	0	0	1	1
13	MF	Warian Santos	0	0	1	0	1
13	MF	Dadá	0	0	1	0	1
13	DF	Levy	1	0	0	0	1
13	DF	Igor João	0	0	0	1	1
Own goals			1	0	1	0	2

=== Disciplinary record ===
As of 26 October 2015

Position	Name	Campeonato Brasileiro Série D		Campeonato Paraense		Copa Verde		Copa do Brasil		Total	
Position	Name	Yellow card	Red card	Yellow card	Red card	Yellow card	Red card	Yellow card	Red card	Yellow card	Red card
DF	Max	4	0	3	0	2	1	0	0	9	1
DF	Ciro Sena	1	0	3	0	2	1	2	0	8	1
DF	Alex Ruan	4	1	2	0	1	0	0	0	7	1
DF	Levy	3	1	2	0	1	0	0	0	6	1
MF	Felipe Macena	0	0	2	0	2	1	0	0	4	1
DF	Igor João	1	0	0	0	0	1	0	0	1	1
MF	Ilaílson	5	0	3	0	3	0	0	0	11	0
MF	Dadá	0	0	6	0	3	0	0	0	9	0
MF	Eduardo Ramos	3	0	2	0	2	0	0	0	7	0
MF	Warian Santos	1	0	2	0	2	0	1	0	6	0
MF	Alberto	0	0	3	0	1	0	0	0	4	0
MF	Bismark	0	0	2	0	1	0	1	0	4	0
DF	Jadílson	0	0	2	0	1	0	0	0	3	0
FW	Sílvio	2	0	0	0	1	0	0	0	3	0
FW	Léo Paraíba	3	0	0	0	0	0	0	0	3	0
FW	Kiros	3	0	0	0	0	0	0	0	3	0
FW	Val Barreto	0	0	1	0	1	0	0	0	2	0
MF	Chicão	3	0	0	0	0	0	0	0	3	0
DF	Rodrigo Soares	2	0	0	0	0	0	0	0	2	0
GK	Fernando Henrique	2	0	0	0	0	0	0	0	2	0
DF	Mateus Muller	2	0	0	0	0	0	0	0	2	0
DF	Henrique	2	0	0	0	0	0	0	0	2	0
MF	Fabrício	0	0	1	0	0	0	0	0	1	0
GK	Camilo	0	0	0	0	1	0	0	0	1	0
FW	Rony	0	0	0	0	1	0	0	0	1	0
FW	Flávio Caça-Rato	0	0	1	0	0	0	0	0	1	0
DF	George Lucas	0	0	0	0	1	0	0	0	1	0
FW	Rafael Paty	1	0	0	0	0	0	0	0	1	0
MF	Leandro Santos	1	0	0	0	0	0	0	0	1	0
MF	Juninho	1	0	0	0	0	0	0	0	1	0
FW	Aleílson	1	0	0	0	0	0	0	0	1	0
	TOTALS	45	2	35	0	25	4	4	0	110	6

== Kit ==
Supplier: Umbro / Main sponsor: Nação Azul

Home	Home alt. 1	Home alt. 2	Home alt. 3	Away	Away alt. 1

== Transfers ==
=== Transfers in ===
Position	Name	From	Source
MF	Fabrício	(Brazil) Tuna Luso	
GK	César Luz	(Brazil) River	
DF	Ciro Sena	(Brazil) Boa Esporte	
MF	Felipe Macena	(Brazil) Vila Nova	
FW	Flávio Caça-Rato	(Brazil) Santa Cruz	
GK	Camilo	(Brazil) ABC	
MF	Alberto	(Brazil) Santa Cruz	
MF	Bismark	(Brazil) Icasa (loan)	
DF	George Lucas	(Brazil) América de Natal	
DF	Cláudio Allax	Free agent	
MF	Mateus Carioca	(Brazil) Novo Hamburgo (loan)	
FW	Aleílson	(Brazil) Paragominas	
MF	Juninho	(Brazil) Parauapebas	
DF	Henrique	(Brazil) Parauapebas	
GK	Fernando Henrique	(Brazil) Internacional de Lages	
MF	Chicão	(Brazil) Independente	
FW	Welthon	(Brazil) Tapajós (loan)	
FW	Léo Paraíba	(Brazil) Princesa do Solimões	
DF	Gabriel Proença	(Brazil) Botafogo	
MF	Leandro Santos	(Brazil) Campinense	
DF	Rodrigo Soares	(Brazil) Taubaté	
DF	Mateus Müller	(Brazil) Palmeiras (loan)	
FW	Kiros	(Brazil) Porto de Caruaru (loan)	

=== Transfers out ===
Position	Name	To	Source
MF	Jhonnatan	(Brazil) Paysandu	
FW	Leandro Cearense	(Brazil) Paysandu	
FW	Flávio Caça-Rato	Free agent	
FW	Rony	(Brazil) Cruzeiro	
GK	Camilo	Free agent	
DF	Cláudio Allax	Free agent	
DF	Jadílson	(Brazil) Icasa	
MF	Alberto	Free agent	
MF	Mateus Carioca	(Brazil) Novo Hamburgo	
MF	Bismark	(Brazil) ABC	
MF	Fabrício	(Brazil) São Raimundo-PA	
DF	Raphael Andrade	(Brazil) Brasília	
MF	Dadá	Free agent	
MF	Warian Santos	(Brazil) Corinthians	
DF	George Lucas	Free agent	
FW	Val Barreto	(Brazil) Mogi Mirim	

== Competitions ==
Competition	First match	Last match	Starting round	Final position	Record							
Competition	First match	Last match	Starting round	Final position	Pld	W	D	L	GF	GA	GD	Win %
Campeonato Brasileiro Série D	12 July 2015	1 November 2015	Group stage	3rd	14	8	3	3	21	9	+12	57.14
Campeonato Paraense	1 February 2015	3 May 2015	First round	Winners	12	7	2	3	18	14	+4	58.33
Copa Verde	8 February 2015	7 May 2015	Round of 16	Runners-up	8	6	0	2	15	10	+5	75.00
Copa do Brasil	2 April 2015	15 April 2015	First round	First round	2	0	2	0	2	2	+0	0.00
Total					36	21	7	8	56	35	+21	58.33

Source: Competitions

=== Campeonato Brasileiro Série D ===
==== Group stage ====
Pos	Team	Pld	W	D	L	GF	GA	GD	Pts
1	(Pará) Remo (A)	8	5	2	1	14	6	+8	17
2	(Acre (state)) Rio Branco (A)	8	4	3	1	10	6	+4	15
3	(Amazonas (Brazilian state)) Nacional	8	2	2	4	10	12	−2	8
4	(Rondônia) Vilhena	8	1	3	4	8	14	−6	6
5	(Roraima) Náutico-RR	8	2	2	4	8	12	−4	4 (Note: Náutico lost 4 points for using 17 irregular players.)

(A) Advance to the Round of 16

===== Matches =====
12 July 2015 1	Vilhena	1–1	Remo	Vilhena
18:30 UTC−3	Alex Barcellos (yellow card) 45', (goal) 79'; Dourado (yellow card) 83'; Vinícius (yellow card) 86'	Report	Chicão 39'; Alex Ruan (yellow card) 45'; Rafael Paty (yellow card) 62'; Eduardo Ramos (yellow card) 66'; Ciro Sena (yellow card) 90'	Stadium: Estádio Portal da Amazônia; Attendance: 340; Referee: Sílvio André Loureiro de Lima

18 July 2015 2	Remo	1–0	Rio Branco	Paragominas
16:00 UTC−3	Warian Santos (yellow card) 30'; Henrique 73'	Report	Tharle (yellow card) 33'	Stadium: Estádio Arena do Município Verde; Attendance: 1,610; Referee: Paulo Sérgio Santos Moreira

2 August 2015 3	Remo	3–0	Náutico-RR	Paragominas
18:30 UTC−3	Ilaílson (yellow card) 20'; Léo Paraíba 66', (yellow card) 67'; Eduardo Ramos 75', 87'	Report	Alan Caruaru (yellow card) 44'; Elton (yellow card) 53'; Wandão (yellow card) 56'	Stadium: Estádio Arena do Município Verde; Attendance: 1,091; Referee: Mayron dos Reis Navais

10 August 2015 4	Nacional	0–1	Remo	Manaus
21:30 UTC−3	Maurício Leal (yellow card) 20'; Júnior Paraíba (yellow card) 30'; Gilson (yellow card) 41'; Danilo Rios (yellow card) 41'; Felipe Manoel (yellow card) 68'; Denis (yellow card) 83'; Robinho (yellow card) 89'	Report	Ilaílson (yellow card) 5'; Max (yellow card) 42'; Eduardo Ramos (yellow card) 45+3'; Chicão (yellow card) 83'; Levy 90+3', (yellow card) 90+4'	Stadium: Arena da Amazônia; Attendance: 11,037; Referee: Rodolpho Toski Marques

17 August 2015 5	Náutico-RR	3–2	Remo	Boa Vista
22:30 UTC−3	Washington 5', 37'; Elton (yellow card) 16'; Heitor (yellow card) 23'; Dudé (yellow card) 39'; Jhonatan (yellow card) 44'; Thiago 54'; Wandão (yellow card) 71'	Report	Ilaílson (yellow card) 23'; Rafael Paty 34'; Rodrigo Soares (yellow card) 49'; Eduardo Ramos 90+4' (pen.)	Stadium: Ribeirão; Attendance: 300; Referee: Rodrigo Carvalhaes de Miranda

22 August 2015 6	Remo	3–2	Nacional	Paragominas
18:30 UTC−3	Max (yellow card) 8'; Edicleber 16'; Sílvio 52'; Henrique 73'; Fernando Henrique (yellow card) 81'; Leandro Santos (yellow card) 83'	Report	Lídio (yellow card) 1'; Rafael Vieira (yellow card) 21'; Thiago Floriano (yellow card) 44'; Felipe 76', (yellow card) 59' (yellow-red card) 77'; Júnior Paraíba 88'	Stadium: Estádio Arena do Município Verde; Attendance: 905; Referee: Eduardo Tomaz de Aquino Valadão

6 September 2015 7	Rio Branco	0–0	Remo	Rio Branco
19:00 UTC−3	Charles Chenko (yellow card) 10'; Marcelo Felber (yellow card) 21'; Pedro Balú (yellow card) 90+4'	Report	Levy (yellow card) 8'; Sílvio (yellow card) 45+2'; Chicão (yellow card) 53'; Ilaílson (yellow card) 87'; Max (yellow card) 90+5'	Stadium: Arena da Floresta; Attendance: 1,791; Referee: Rodrigo Nunes de Sá

13 September 2015 8	Remo	3–0	Vilhena	Belém
18:00 UTC−3	Léo Paraíba 9'; Sílvio (yellow card) 47', (goal) 74'; Igor João (yellow card) 51'; Chicão 79'	Report	Vinícius (yellow card) 62' (yellow-red card) 71'; Kleber Willian (yellow card) 64'; Marinho (yellow card) 78'; Wagner (yellow card) 83'	Stadium: Mangueirão; Attendance: 27,399; Referee: Léo Simão Holanda

==== Final stage ====
===== Round of 16 =====
26 September 2015 First leg	Palmas	1–0	Remo	Palmas
16:00 UTC−3	Hélber (yellow card) 18' (yellow-red card) 90+5'; Ted (yellow card) 45+1'; Leandro Teófilo (yellow card) 74'; Dan 90+1' (pen.); Alan Kardek (yellow card) 90+7'	Report	Alex Ruan (yellow card) 31'; Kiros (yellow card) 37'; Rodrigo Soares (yellow card) 55'	Stadium: Estádio Nilton Santos; Attendance: 2,219; Referee: Avelar Rodrigo da Silva

3 October 2015 Second leg	Remo	3–0 (3–1 agg.)	Palmas	Belém
16:00 UTC−3	Alex Ruan (yellow card) 1' (yellow-red card) 68'; Kiros 20', 45+2' (yellow card) 36'; Eduardo Ramos 34'; Aleílson (yellow card) 45'; Léo Paraíba (yellow card) 45+4'; Henrique (yellow card) 67'	Report	Ederson (yellow card) 33'; Daylson (yellow card) 41'; Valdo (yellow card) 42'; Laionel (yellow card) 57'; Moacri (yellow card) 90'	Stadium: Mangueirão; Attendance: 28,130; Referee: Marcelo Aparecido Ribeiro de Souza

===== Quarter-finals =====
10 October 2015 First leg	Operário Ferroviário	0–1	Remo	Ponta Grossa
19:00 UTC−3	Joélson (yellow card) 39'; Lucas (yellow card) 76'; Julinho (yellow card) 84'	Report	Kiros (yellow card) 11'; Ilaílson (yellow card) 24'; Alemão 40' (o.g.); Mateus Muller (yellow card) 53'; Max (yellow card) 77'; Fernando Henrique (yellow card) 78'; Léo Paraíba (yellow card) 90'	Stadium: Estádio Germano Krüger; Attendance: 5,282; Referee: Igor Júnio Benevenuto

18 October 2015 Second leg	Remo	3–1 (4–1 agg.)	Operário Ferroviário	Belém
18:00 UTC−3	Mateus Muller (yellow card) 15'; Welthon 21'; Levy (yellow card) 41' (yellow-red card) 61'; Eduardo Ramos 55', (yellow card) 73'; Aleílson 59'	Report	Doda (yellow card) 6'; Peixoto (yellow card) 32'; Chicão (yellow card) 58'; Julinho (yellow card) 61'; Capa (red card) 64'; Lucas (yellow card) 73'; Alemão 79'; Douglas Mendes (yellow card) 80'	Stadium: Mangueirão; Attendance: 31,681; Referee: Jaílson Macedo Freitas

===== Semi-finals =====
25 October 2015 First leg	Botafogo-SP	1–0	Remo	Ribeirão Preto
18:00 UTC−3	Caio Ruan (yellow card) 42'; Samuel Santos (yellow card) 58'; Nunes (yellow card) 68'; Canela 85'	Report	Chicão (yellow card) 43'; Henrique (yellow card) 56'; Juninho (yellow card) 69'	Stadium: Estádio Santa Cruz; Attendance: 5,176; Referee: Wagner do Nascimento Magalhães

1 November 2015 Second leg	Remo	0–0 (0–1 agg.)	Botafogo-SP	Belém
19:00 UTC−3		Report	Mirita (yellow card) 35'; Rodrigo Thiesen (yellow card) 55'; Augusto Ramos (yellow card) 74'; Carlos Henrique (yellow card) 81'	Stadium: Mangueirão; Attendance: 16,940; Referee: Nielson Nogueira Dias

=== Campeonato Paraense ===
==== First round ====
Pos	Team	Pld	W	D	L	GF	GA	GD	Pts	Qualification
1	Parauapebas (A)	4	3	0	1	6	3	+3	9	Qualifies to the Final stage
2	Independente (A)	4	3	0	1	6	3	+3	9	Qualifies to the Final stage
3	São Francisco	4	1	2	1	6	6	0	5	
4	Remo	4	1	1	2	3	4	−1	4	
5	Castanhal	4	0	1	3	3	8	−5	1	

(A) Advance to a further round

===== Matches =====
1 February 2015 1	Remo	1–2	Parauapebas	Belém
16:00 UTC−3	Max (yellow card) 30'; Rafael Paty 55'; Dadá (yellow card) 61'; Eduardo Ramos (yellow card) 70'	Report	Magno 2'; Henrique (yellow card) 18'; Juninho 43'; Mocajuba (yellow card) 64'; Célio Codó (yellow card) 76'; Paulo Rafael (yellow card) 85'; Léo (yellow card) 87'	Stadium: Mangueirão; Attendance: 18,410; Referee: Joelson Nazareno Ferreira Cardoso

4 February 2015 2	Independente	1–0	Remo	Tucuruí
20:30 UTC−3	Daniel Piauí (yellow card) 26' (yellow-red card) 90+3'; Cristian 53' (yellow card) 55'; Ângelo (yellow card) 37'; Rubran (yellow card) 86'; Alencar Baú (yellow card) 90+5'	Report	Alberto (yellow card) 18'; Felipe Macena (yellow card) 33'; Max (yellow card) 34'	Stadium: Navegantão; Attendance: 2,129; Referee: Marco Antônio da Silva Mendonça

19 February 2015 3	São Francisco	1–1	Remo	Santarém
20:30 UTC−3	Balão Marabá (yellow card) 33'; Bruno Everton (yellow card) 51'; Gerson 86'	Report	Max (yellow card) 10'; Dadá (yellow card) 29'; Flávio Caça-Rato 35'	Stadium: Estádio Municipal Colosso do Tapajós; Attendance: 2,737; Referee: Raimundo Gilson Gonçalves de Brito

25 February 2015 4	Remo	1–0	Castanhal	Belém
20:30 UTC−3	Ciro Sena (yellow card) 56'; Fabrício (yellow card) 79'; Eduardo Ramos 83'; Dadá (yellow card) 88'	Report	Aguiar (yellow card) 62'; Alessandro (yellow card) 82'	Stadium: Mangueirão; Attendance: 2,165; Referee: Benedito Pinto da Silva

==== Second round ====
Pos	Team	Pld	W	D	L	GF	GA	GD	Pts	Qualification
1	Remo (A)	5	3	1	1	10	9	+1	10	Qualifies to the Final stage
2	Parauapebas (A)	5	2	2	1	9	6	+3	8	Qualifies to the Final stage
3	Independente	5	2	1	2	6	7	−1	7	
4	São Francisco	5	2	1	2	9	16	−7	7	
5	Castanhal	5	1	2	2	6	9	−3	5	

(A) Advance to a further round

===== Matches =====
15 March 2015 1	Remo	5–5	Tapajós	Belém
16:00 UTC−3	Eduardo Ramos 4' (pen.), 11' (pen.); Ilaílson (yellow card) 38'; Bismark (yellow card) 53'; Rafael Paty 57'; Jadílson (yellow card) 63'; Ciro Sena (yellow card) 66'; Alberto 67', (yellow card) 81'; Val Barreto 74'	Report	Helder (yellow card) 3', (goal) 53'; Thiago Costa 6'; Neguéba (yellow card) 9'; Moisés 33'; Tobias (yellow card) 43'; Amaral (yellow card) 45'; Welthon 49', 88' (pen.); Jader (yellow card) 59'	Stadium: Mangueirão; Attendance: 6,052; Referee: Andrey da Silva e Silva

18 March 2015 2	Cametá	0–1	Remo	Cametá
20:30 UTC−3	Magno (yellow card) 33'; Sousa (yellow card) 71'; Wanderson (yellow card) 87'	Report	Dadá (yellow card) 37'; Flávio Caça-Rato (yellow card) 50'; Val Barreto (yellow card) 64'; Alberto (yellow card) 68', (goal) 89'	Stadium: Parque do Bacurau; Attendance: 1,813; Referee: Wasley do Couto

26 March 2015 3	Remo	2–1	Gavião Kyikatejê	Belém
20:40 UTC−3	Bismark 11', 38'; Dadá (yellow card) 50'; Felipe Macena (yellow card) 59'; Eduardo Ramos (yellow card) 86'; Jadílson (yellow card) 89'	Report	Monga 14'; Preto Marabá (yellow card) 27'; Vando (yellow card) 60'; Edinaldo (yellow card) 81'	Stadium: Mangueirão; Attendance: 3,612; Referee: Marcos Antônio da Silva Mendonça

29 March 2015 4	Remo	1–3	Paysandu	Belém
16:00 UTC−3	Ciro Sena (yellow card) 20'; Levy (yellow card) 57'; Rafael Paty 86' (pen.)	Report	Dão 2'; Pablo (yellow card) 24'; Marlon (yellow card) 39'; Yago Pikachu 51' (pen.); Bruno Veiga 88'; Souza (yellow card) 89'	Stadium: Mangueirão; Attendance: 17,381; Referee: Raphael Claus

12 April 2015 5	Paragominas	0–1	Remo	Paragominas
16:00 UTC−3	Romário (yellow card) 24'; Rogério Rios (yellow card) 28'; George (yellow card) 37'; Victor (yellow card) 59'	Report	Alex Ruan (yellow card) 5'; Dadá (yellow card) 25'; Ilaílson (yellow card) 29'; Bismark 67', (yellow card) 68'	Stadium: Estádio Arena do Município Verde; Attendance: 3,080; Referee: Dewson Fernando Freitas da Silva

===== Final stage =====
21 April 2015 Semi-finals	Remo	1–0	Paragominas	Belém
16:00 UTC−3	Warian Santos (yellow card) 19'; Eduardo Ramos 37'	Report	Bruno Maranhão (yellow card) 27'; Rogério Rios (yellow card) 35'; Aleílson (yellow card) 50'; Beá (yellow card) 64'; Rodolfo Bastos (yellow card) 73'	Stadium: Mangueirão; Attendance: 21,096; Referee: Andrey da Silva e Silva

26 April 2015 Final	Remo	2–1	Paysandu	Belém
16:00 UTC−3	Rafael Paty 21', 46'; Ilaílson (yellow card) 59'; Levy (yellow card) 78'	Report	Aylon 25'; Romário (yellow card) 27'; Willian Alves (yellow card) 76'; Augusto Recife (yellow card) 83'; Yago Pikachu (yellow card) 86' (yellow-red card) 87'; Marquinhos (yellow card) 90+3'	Stadium: Mangueirão; Attendance: 26,416; Referee: Luiz Flávio de Oliveira

==== Final ====
3 May 2015	Independente	0–2	Remo	Belém
16:00 UTC−3	Wegno (yellow card) 10'; Chicão (yellow card) 29'; Joãozinho (yellow card) 52'; Dudu (yellow card) 78'; Jackinha (yellow card) 79'	Report	Rafael Paty 1', 26'; Alex Ruan (yellow card) 33'; Warian Santos (yellow card) 40'	Stadium: Mangueirão; Attendance: 34,773; Referee: Dewson Fernando Freitas da Silva

=== Copa Verde ===
==== Round of 16 ====
8 February 2015 First leg	Remo	2–0	Rio Branco	Belém
18:30 UTC−3	Alberto 50'; Rony 58'; Levy (yellow card) 68'	Report	Olliver (yellow card) 57'; William (yellow card) 62'; Rylber (yellow card) 65'	Stadium: Mangueirão; Attendance: 6,982; Referee: Valdicleuson Silva da Costa

22 February 2015 Second leg	Rio Branco	0–2 (0–4 agg.)	Remo	Rio Branco
19:00 UTC−3	Léo (yellow card) 65'; Victor Hugo (yellow card) 77'	Report	Alberto (yellow card) 26'; Rony 32'; Max (yellow card) 57'; Alex Ruan (yellow card) 59'; Camilo (yellow card) 81'; Ciro Sena (yellow card) 87'; Flávio Caça-Rato 89'	Stadium: Arena da Floresta; Attendance: 975; Referee: Wales Martins de Souza

==== Quarter-finals ====
9 March 2015 First leg	Princesa do Solimões	1–2	Remo	Manaus
21:30 UTC−3	Deurick (yellow card) 20'; Gilson 47'; Mauryan (yellow card) 84'; Sandro Goiano (yellow card) 90+2'	Report	Alberto 63'; Dadá (yellow card) 70'; Eduardo Ramos 81', (yellow card) 90'	Stadium: Estádio Ismael Benigno; Attendance: 1,480; Referee: Alisson Sidnei Furtado

21 March 2015 Second leg	Remo	2–1 (4–2 agg.)	Princesa do Solimões	Belém
16:00 UTC−3	Deurick 11' (o.g.); Val Barreto (yellow card) 29', (goal) 42'; Felipe Macena (yellow card) 38'; Eduardo Ramos (yellow card) 41'; Dadá (yellow card) 60'	Report	Léo Paraíba (yellow card) 10'; Amaral (yellow card) 46' (yellow-red card) 77'; Deurick 61'	Stadium: Mangueirão; Attendance: 6,970; Referee: Rodrigo Batista Raposo

==== Semi-finals ====
5 April 2015 First leg	Paysandu	2–0	Remo	Belém
18:30 UTC−3	Jhonnatan (red card) 4'; Augusto Recife (yellow card) 21'; Yago Pikachu (yellow card) 29', (goal) 32'; Marquinhos (yellow card) 53'; Aylon (yellow card) 70'; Bruno Veiga 76'	Report	Ciro Sena (red card) 4'; Ilaílson (yellow card) 32'; Bismark (yellow card) 79'; Rony (yellow card) 83'; Jadílson (yellow card) 87'	Stadium: Mangueirão; Attendance: 16,312; Referee: Wagner Reway

18 April 2015 Second leg	Remo	2–0 (2–2 agg.) (5–4 p)	Paysandu	Belém
16:00 UTC−3	Ilaílson (yellow card) 21'; Warian Santos (yellow card) 21'; Dadá (yellow card) 27', (goal) 40'; Sílvio 88', (yellow card) 89'	Report	Radamés (yellow card) 26'; Augusto Recife (yellow card) 65'; Leandro Canhoto (yellow card) 84'	Stadium: Mangueirão; Attendance: 21,861; Referee: Marcos André Gomes da Penha
	Penalties
	Val Barreto (penalty scored); Dadá (penalty scored); Bismark (penalty scored); Max (penalty scored); Levy (penalty scored)		(penalty scored) Augusto Recife; (penalty missed) Carlinhos; (penalty scored) Radamés; (penalty scored) Bruno Veiga; (penalty scored) Leandro Canhoto

==== Finals ====
30 April 2015 First leg	Remo	4–1	Cuiabá	Belém
19:40 UTC−3	Rafael Paty 21' (pen.), 43'; Ilaílson (yellow card) 29'; Ratinho 32'; Warian Santos 87'	Report	Felipe (yellow card) 17'; Ricardo Braz (red card) 20'; Kaique 23'; Felipe Blau (yellow card) 65'	Stadium: Mangueirão; Attendance: 34,780; Referee: Alisson Sidnei Furtado

7 May 2015 Second leg	Cuiabá	5–1 (6–5 agg.)	Remo	Cuiabá
22:00 UTC−3	Kaique (yellow card) 16'; Raphael Luz 24' (pen.), 33', 49' (pen.), (yellow card) 50' (yellow-red card) 89'; Nino Guerreiro 41', 80'; Willian Alves (yellow card) 89'	Report	Warian Santos (yellow card) 12'; Max (yellow card) 25', (red card) 68'; Felipe Macena (yellow card) 56' (yellow-red card) 90+1'; Ciro Sena (yellow card) 63'; George Lucas (yellow card) 63'; Val Barreto 73'; Igor João (red card) 90+5'	Stadium: Arena Pantanal; Attendance: 3,315; Referee: Paulo Henrique Schleich Vollkopf

=== Copa do Brasil ===
==== First round ====
2 April 2015 First leg	Remo	1–1	Atlético Paranaense	Belém
21:50 UTC−3	Ciro Sena (yellow card) 75'; Igor João 76'	Report	Felipe 48' (pen.)	Stadium: Mangueirão; Attendance: 8,112; Referee: Antônio Neuriclaudio do Rego Costa

15 April 2015 Second leg	Atlético Paranaense	1–1 (2–2 agg.) (5–4 p)	Remo	Curitiba
19:30 UTC−3	Lula 19'; Deivid (yellow card) 28'; Felipe (yellow card) 51'; Gustavo (yellow card) 52'; Jadson (yellow card) 59'	Report	Bismark (yellow card) 24'; Ciro Sena (yellow card) 28'; Felipe Macena 53'; Warian Santos (yellow card) 64'	Stadium: Arena da Baixada; Attendance: 8,724; Referee: Bráulio da Silva Machado
	Penalties
	Gustavo (penalty scored); Natanael (penalty scored); Felipe (penalty scored); Jadson (penalty missed); Gustavo Marmentini (penalty scored); Rafinha (penalty scored)		(penalty missed) Alex Ruan; (penalty scored) Ratinho; (penalty scored) Felipe Macena; (penalty scored) Rafael Paty; (penalty scored) Levy; (penalty missed) Ilaílson
