= 2015 Copa Verde finals =

- Event: 2015 Copa Verde
Remo	Cuiabá
(Pará)	(Mato Grosso)
5	6
- on aggregate

First leg
Remo	Cuiabá
4	1
- Date: 30 April 2015
- Venue: Mangueirão, Belém
- Referee: Alisson Sidnei Furtado
- Attendance: 34,780

Second leg
Cuiabá	Remo
5	1
- Date: 7 May 2015
- Venue: Arena Pantanal, Cuiabá
- Referee: Paulo Henrique Schleich Vollkopf
- Attendance: 3,315

The 2015 Copa Verde finals was the final two-legged tie that decided the 2015 Copa Verde, the 2nd season of the Copa Verde, Brazil's regional cup football tournament organised by the Brazilian Football Confederation.

The finals were contested in a two-legged home-and-away format between Remo, from Pará, and Cuiabá, from Mato Grosso.

Cuiabá defeated Remo 6–5 on aggregate to win their first Copa Verde title.

== Teams ==
Team	Previous finals appearances (bold indicates winners)
(Pará) Remo	None
(Mato Grosso) Cuiabá	None

=== Road to the final ===
Note: In all scores below, the score of the finalist is given first.

(Pará) Remo			Round	(Mato Grosso) Cuiabá		
Opponent	Venue	Score		Opponent	Venue	Score
(Acre (state)) Rio Branco (won 4–0 on aggregate)	Home	2–0	Round of 16	(Mato Grosso do Sul) CENE (won 4–1 on aggregate)	Away	1–0
(Acre (state)) Rio Branco (won 4–0 on aggregate)	Away	2–0	Round of 16	(Mato Grosso do Sul) CENE (won 4–1 on aggregate)	Home	3–1
(Amazonas (Brazilian state)) Princesa do Solimões (won 4–2 on aggregate)	Away	2–1	Quarter-finals	(Espírito Santo) Estrela do Norte (won 2–1 on aggregate)	Away	1–0
(Amazonas (Brazilian state)) Princesa do Solimões (won 4–2 on aggregate)	Home	2–1	Quarter-finals	(Espírito Santo) Estrela do Norte (won 2–1 on aggregate)	Home	1–1
(Pará) Paysandu (tied 2–2 on aggregate, won 5–4 on penalties)	Neutral	0–2	Semi-finals	(Mato Grosso) Luverdense (won 1–0 on aggregate)	Away	1–0
(Pará) Paysandu (tied 2–2 on aggregate, won 5–4 on penalties)	Neutral	2–0	Semi-finals	(Mato Grosso) Luverdense (won 1–0 on aggregate)	Home	0–0

== Format ==
The finals were played on a home-and-away two-legged basis. If tied on aggregate, the penalty shoot-out was used to determine the winner.

== Matches ==
=== First leg ===
30 April 2015
19:40 BRT (UTC−3)

Remo (Pará)	4–1	(Mato Grosso) Cuiabá
Rafael Paty 21' (pen.), 43'; Ratinho 32'; Warian Santos 87'	Report	Kaique 23'

Mangueirão, Belém
Attendance: 34,780
Referee: Alisson Sidnei Furtado (Tocantins)

**Remo**	**Cuiabá**

GK	1	(Brazil) Fabiano (c)
DF	2	(Brazil) Levy
DF	3	(Brazil) Max
DF	4	(Brazil) Igor João
DF	6	(Brazil) Alex Ruan	(substituted off) 65'
MF	5	(Brazil) Ilaílson	(yellow card) 29'
MF	8	(Brazil) Warian Santos
MF	11	(Brazil) Ratinho
MF	10	(Brazil) Eduardo Ramos	(substituted off) 75'
FW	7	(Brazil) Bismark	(substituted off) 56'
FW	9	(Brazil) Rafael Paty
Substitutes:
GK	12	(Brazil) César Luz
GK	25	(Brazil) Camilo
DF	13	(Brazil) Ciro Sena
DF	15	(Brazil) Jadílson	(substituted in) 65'
DF	17	(Brazil) Raphael Andrade
DF	21	(Brazil) Yan
DF	22	(Brazil) George Lucas
MF	14	(Brazil) Alberto
MF	16	(Brazil) Felipe Macena
MF	18	(Brazil) Fabrício
FW	19	(Brazil) Sílvio	(substituted in) 56'
FW	20	(Brazil) Val Barreto	(substituted in) 75'
Coach:
(Brazil) Cacaio

GK	1	(Brazil) Willian Alves
DF	2	(Brazil) Gean
DF	3	(Brazil) Ricardo Braz	(red card) 20'
DF	4	(Brazil) Egon
DF	6	(Brazil) Maninho
MF	5	(Brazil) Bogé (c)
MF	8	(Brazil) Felipe Blau	(yellow card) 57'
MF	7	(Brazil) Kaique	(substituted off) 73'
MF	10	(Brazil) Raphael Luz
FW	11	(Brazil) Felipe Alves	(yellow card) 17'	(substituted off) 22'
FW	9	(Brazil) Nino Guerreiro	(substituted off) 46'
Substitutes:
GK	12	(Brazil) André Luís
DF	13	(Brazil) Diego Macedo	(substituted in) 22'
DF	14	(Brazil) Grafite	(substituted in) 73'
DF	18	(Brazil) Murilo Ceará	(substituted in) 46'
MF	15	(Brazil) Pink
MF	16	(Brazil) Geovani
FW	17	(Brazil) Bruno Mota
Coach:
(Brazil) Fernando Marchiori

Assistant referees:
Francisco Casimiro de Sousa (Tocantins)
Marcos Santos Vieira (Amazonas)
Fourth official:
Andrey da Silva e Silva (Pará)
Fifth official:
Heronildo Sebastião Freitas da Silva (Pará)

=== Second leg ===
7 May 2015
21:00 AMT (UTC−4)

Cuiabá (Mato Grosso)	5–1	(Pará) Remo
Raphael Luz 24' (pen.), 33', 49' (pen.); Nino Guerreiro 41', 80'	Report	Val Barreto 73'

Arena Pantanal, Cuiabá
Attendance: 3,315
Referee: Paulo Henrique Schleich Vollkopf (Mato Grosso do Sul)

**Cuiabá**	**Remo**

GK	1	(Brazil) Willian Alves		(yellow card) 89'
DF	2	(Brazil) Gean
DF	3	(Brazil) Diego Macedo
DF	4	(Brazil) Egon
DF	6	(Brazil) Maninho
MF	5	(Brazil) Bogé (c)
MF	8	(Brazil) Felipe Blau
MF	7	(Brazil) Kaique	(yellow card) 16'	(substituted off) 81'
MF	10	(Brazil) Raphael Luz		(yellow card) 50' (yellow-red card) 89'
FW	11	(Brazil) Geovani		(substituted off) 71'
FW	9	(Brazil) Nino Guerreiro		(substituted off) 89'
Substitutes:
GK	12	(Brazil) André Luís
DF	13	(Brazil) Bruno Leandro		(substituted in) 89'
DF	15	(Brazil) Grafite		(substituted in) 71'
DF	16	(Brazil) Murilo Ceará		(substituted in) 81'
MF	14	(Brazil) Pink
FW	17	(Brazil) Bruno Mota
FW	18	(Brazil) Dominic Vinicius
Coach:
(Brazil) Fernando Marchiori

GK	1	(Brazil) Fabiano (c)
DF	2	(Brazil) Levy
DF	3	(Brazil) Max	(yellow card) 25'	(red card) 68'
DF	4	(Brazil) Igor João		(red card) 90+'
DF	6	(Brazil) Alex Ruan
MF	5	(Brazil) Warian Santos	(yellow card) 12'	(substituted off) 58'
MF	8	(Brazil) Dadá
MF	11	(Brazil) Ratinho		(substituted off) 46'
MF	10	(Brazil) Eduardo Ramos
FW	7	(Brazil) Bismark		(substituted off) 32'
FW	9	(Brazil) Rafael Paty
Substitutes:
GK	12	(Brazil) César Luz
DF	13	(Brazil) Ciro Sena		(yellow card) 63'
DF	14	(Brazil) George Lucas		(yellow card) 63'
DF	16	(Brazil) Jadílson
MF	15	(Brazil) Felipe Macena	(yellow card) 56' (yellow-red card) 90+1'	(substituted in) 32'
MF	17	(Brazil) Fabrício
MF	18	(Brazil) Alberto
FW	19	(Brazil) Sílvio		(substituted in) 46'
FW	20	(Brazil) Val Barreto		(substituted in) 58'
Coach:
(Brazil) Cacaio

Assistant referees:
Bruno Raphael Pires (Goiás)
Eduardo Gonçalves da Cruz (Mato Grosso do Sul)
Fourth official:
Wagner Reway (Mato Grosso)
Fifth official:
Fábio Rodrigo Rubinho (Mato Grosso)

== See also ==
- 2016 Copa Sudamericana
