= 2015 Campeonato Paraense final =

- Event: 2015 Campeonato Paraense
Independente	Remo
0	2
- Date: 3 May 2015
- Venue: Mangueirão, Belém
- Referee: Dewson Fernando Freitas da Silva
- Attendance: 34,773

The 2015 Campeonato Paraense final was the final that decided the 2015 Campeonato Paraense, the 103rd season of the Campeonato Paraense. The final were contested between Independente and Remo.

Remo defeated Independente 2–0 to win their 44th Campeonato Paraense title.

== Teams ==
Team	Qualification method
Independente	Taça Cidade de Belém winners
Remo	Taça Estado do Pará winners

== Match ==
=== Details ===
3 May 2015
16:00 UTC−3

Independente	0–2	Remo
	Report	Rafael Paty 1', 26'

Mangueirão, Belém
Attendance: 34,773
Referee: Dewson Fernando Freitas da Silva

Independente	Remo

GK	1	(Brazil) Alencar Baú
DF	2	(Brazil) Léo Rosa
DF	3	(Brazil) Rubran		(substituted off) 38'
DF	4	(Brazil) Ezequias
DF	6	(Brazil) Jackinha		(yellow card) 79'
MF	5	(Brazil) Dudu		(yellow card) 78'
MF	7	(Brazil) Chicão		(yellow card) 29'
MF	8	(Brazil) Ângelo
MF	10	(Brazil) Kariri		(substituted off) 46'
FW	11	(Brazil) Joãozinho		(yellow card) 52'
FW	9	(Brazil) Wegno (c)	(yellow card) 10'	(substituted off) 63'
Substitutes:
DF	14	(Brazil) Ivson		(substituted in) 38'
FW	20	(Brazil) Daniel Piauí		(substituted in) 46'
FW	21	(Brazil) Raygol		(substituted in) 63'
Coach:
(Brazil) Lecheva

GK	1	(Brazil) Fabiano (c)
DF	2	(Brazil) Levy
DF	3	(Brazil) Max
DF	4	(Brazil) Igor João
DF	6	(Brazil) Alex Ruan	(yellow card) 33'
MF	5	(Brazil) Warian Santos	(yellow card) 40'
MF	8	(Brazil) Dadá	(substituted off) 83'
MF	11	(Brazil) Ratinho	(substituted off) 55'
MF	10	(Brazil) Eduardo Ramos
FW	7	(Brazil) Bismark
FW	9	(Brazil) Rafael Paty	(substituted off) 68'
Substitutes:
MF	16	(Brazil) Alberto	(substituted in) 55'
MF	18	(Brazil) Felipe Macena	(substituted in) 83'
FW	19	(Brazil) Sílvio	(substituted in) 68'
Coach:
(Brazil) Cacaio

Assistant referees:
José Ricardo Guimarães Coimbra (Pará)
Luís Diego Nascimento Lopes (Pará)
Fourth official:
Andrey da Silva e Silva (Pará)
Fifth official:
Olivaldo José Moraes (Pará)

== See also ==
- 2016 Copa Verde
- 2016 Copa do Brasil
