= 2014 Campeonato Paraense finals =

Football match

- Event: 2014 Campeonato Paraense
Paysandu	Remo
3	4
- on aggregate

First leg
Paysandu	Remo
1	4
- Date: 4 June 2014
- Venue: Mangueirão, Belém
- Referee: Leandro Pedro Vuaden
- Attendance: 12,970

Second leg
Remo	Paysandu
0	2
- Date: 8 June 2014
- Venue: Mangueirão, Belém
- Referee: Héber Lopes
- Attendance: 21,048

The 2014 Campeonato Paraense finals was the final that decided the 2014 Campeonato Paraense, the 102nd season of the Campeonato Paraense. The final were contested between Paysandu and Remo.

Remo defeated Paysandu 4–3 on aggregate to win their 43rd Campeonato Paraense title.

== Teams ==
Team	Qualification method
Paysandu	Taça Estado do Pará winners
Remo	Taça Cidade de Belém winners

== Format ==
The finals were played on a home-and-away two-legged basis. If tied on aggregate, the penalty shoot-out was used to determine the winner.

== Matches ==
=== First leg ===
4 June 2014
20:30 UTC−3

Paysandu	1–4	Remo
Heliton 73'	Report	Charles 22' (o.g.); Jhonnatan 47'; Leandro Cearense 76'; Ratinho 85'

Mangueirão, Belém
Attendance: 12,970
Referee: Leandro Pedro Vuaden

Paysandu	Remo

GK	101	(Brazil) Matheus
DF	102	(Brazil) Djalma	(substituted off) 57'
DF	103	(Brazil) Charles	(red card) 17'
DF	104	(Brazil) João Paulo (c)
DF	106	(Brazil) Bruninho	(substituted off) 57'
MF	105	(Brazil) Augusto Recife	(yellow card) 11'
MF	107	(Brazil) Ricardo Capanema
MF	108	(Brazil) Zé Antônio
MF	110	(Brazil) Héverton	(substituted off) 19'
FW	111	(Brazil) Yago Pikachu	(yellow card) 89'
FW	109	(Brazil) Lima
Substitutes:
DF	113	(Brazil) Leandro Silva	(substituted in) 19'
MF	116	(Brazil) Marcos Paraná	(substituted in) 57'
FW	120	(Brazil) Heliton	(substituted in) 57'
Coach:
(Brazil) Mazola Júnior

GK	1	(Brazil) Maycki Douglas
DF	2	(Brazil) Levy
DF	3	(Brazil) Igor João		(yellow card) 35'
DF	4	(Brazil) Max
DF	6	(Brazil) Alex Ruan		(substituted off) 71'
MF	5	(Brazil) Warian Santos		(yellow card) 86'
MF	8	(Brazil) André	(yellow card) 28'	(substituted off) 63'
MF	11	(Brazil) Jhonnatan		(substituted off) 81'
MF	10	(Brazil) Eduardo Ramos (c)		(yellow card) 38'
FW	7	(Brazil) Rony
FW	9	(Brazil) Leandro Cearense
Substitutes:
DF	15	(Brazil) Rodrigo Fernandes		(substituted in) 63'
MF	19	(Brazil) Tsunami		(substituted in) 81'
MF	17	(Brazil) Ratinho		(substituted in) 71'
Coach:
(Brazil) Roberto Fernandes

Assistant referees:
Alessandro Rocha Matos (Bahia)
Fábio Pereira (Tocantins)
Fourth official:
Marco Antônio da Silva Mendonça (Pará)
Fifth official:
Joel Alberto Teixeira Resende (Pará)

=== Second leg ===
8 June 2014
16:00 UTC−3

Remo	0–2	Paysandu
	Report	Dennis 8'; Yago Pikachu 25'

Mangueirão, Belém
Attendance: 21,048
Referee: Heber Lopes

Remo	Paysandu

GK	1	(Brazil) Maycki Douglas	(yellow card) 90+8'
DF	2	(Brazil) Levy
DF	3	(Brazil) Raphael Andrade
DF	4	(Brazil) Max
DF	6	(Brazil) Alex Ruan	(red card) 90+19'
MF	5	(Brazil) André (c)	(substituted off) 90+9'
MF	8	(Brazil) Dadá
MF	11	(Brazil) Warian Santos	(substituted off) 46'
MF	10	(Brazil) Thiago Potiguar	(substituted off) 46'
FW	7	(Brazil) Rony
FW	9	(Brazil) Leandro Cearense
Substitutes:
MF	14	(Brazil) Ilaílson	(substituted in) 90+9'
MF	20	(Brazil) Jhonnatan	(substituted in) 46'
MF	17	(Brazil) Ratinho	(substituted in) 46'
Coach:
(Brazil) Roberto Fernandes

GK	101	(Brazil) Paulo Rafael
DF	102	(Brazil) Yago Pikachu
DF	103	(Brazil) Vanderson		(yellow card) 84'
DF	104	(Brazil) Ricardo Capanema
DF	106	(Brazil) Airton		(substituted off) 83'
MF	105	(Brazil) Augusto Recife (c)
MF	107	(Brazil) Billy
MF	108	(Brazil) Zé Antônio
MF	110	(Brazil) Héverton		(yellow card) 11'
FW	111	(Brazil) Dennis
FW	109	(Brazil) Lima		(substituted off) 12'
Substitutes:
DF	114	(Brazil) Bruninho		(substituted in) 87'
MF	116	(Brazil) Marcos Paraná	(substituted in) 12'	(substituted off) 87'
FW	120	(Brazil) Leandro Carvalho		(substituted in) 83'
Coach:
(Brazil) Mazola Júnior

Assistant referees:
Márcio Eustáquio Sousa Santiago (Minas Gerais)
Bruno Boschilia (Paraná)

== See also ==
- 2015 Copa Verde
- 2015 Copa do Brasil
