= 2014 Campeonato Paraense =

Campeonato Paraense de Futebol
- Season: 2014
- Champions: Remo
- Relegated: Time Negra; Tuna Luso
- Copa do Brasil: Remo; Paysandu; Independente
- Série D: Remo
- Copa Verde: Remo; Paysandu; Independente
- Goals scored: 273
- Top goalscorer: Rafael Paty (Santa Cruz de Cuiarana) - 13 goals
- Biggest home win: Paysandu 6–0 São Francisco (2 February 2014)
- Biggest away win: Paysandu 1–4 Remo (4 June 2014)

The 2014 Campeonato Paraense de Futebol was the 102nd edition of Pará's top professional football league. The competition began in October 30, 2013 and ended on June 8, 2014. Remo won the championship by the 43rd time.

== Format ==
The competition has three stages. On the First stage, 8 teams play a single round-robin. The two teams with the worst campaign on this stage are relegated to the state's second division.

On the Second stage, there are two rounds. Each round is a round-robin. The four best teams in each round advances to a playoff, so the winner of the round can be found.

On the Final stage, each round winner plays in the final. If the same team wins both round, that team is the champion.

The champion, the runner-up and the 3rd-placed team qualify to the 2015 Copa do Brasil and 2015 Copa Verde. The best team who isn't on Campeonato Brasileiro Série A, Série B or Série C qualifies to Série D.

== Participating teams ==
=== First stage ===
Club	Home city	2013 result
Águia de Marabá	Marabá	8th (on Second Stage)
Castanhal	Castanhal	6th (on First Stage)
Gavião Kyikatejê	Marabá	2nd (2nd division)
Independente	Tucuruí	5th (on First Stage)
Parauapebas	Parauapebas	3rd (on First Stage)
São Raimundo	Santarém	4th (on First Stage)
Time Negra	Belém	1st (on 2nd division)
Tuna Luso	Belém	7th (on Second Stage)

=== Second stage ===
Club	Home city	2013 result
Cametá	Cametá	6th
Gavião Kyikatejê	Marabá	2nd (First Stage)
Independente	Tucuruí	1st (First Stage)
Paragominas	Paragominas	2nd
Paysandu	Belém	1st
Remo	Belém	3rd
Santa Cruz de Cuiarana	Salinópolis	4th
São Francisco	Santarém	5th

== First stage (Taça ACLEP) ==
Pos	Team	Pld	W	D	L	GF	GA	GD	Pts	Qualification
1	Independente (A)	7	5	0	2	12	9	+3	15	Qualifies to the Second stage
2	Gavião Kyikatejê (A)	7	4	3	0	9	3	+6	15	Qualifies to the Second stage
3	Águia de Marabá	7	4	1	2	17	12	+5	13	
4	São Raimundo	7	3	3	1	9	5	+4	12	
5	Parauapebas	7	3	0	4	10	12	−2	9	
6	Castanhal	7	1	2	4	8	11	−3	5	
7	Time Negra	7	0	4	3	8	15	−7	4	
8	Tuna Luso	7	0	3	4	3	9	−6	3	

Source: Radio clube do para
Rules for classification: 1) points; 2) goal difference; 3) number of goals scored.
(A) Advance to a further round

=== Results ===
Home \ Away	AGM	CAS	GVK	IND	PRB	SRA	TMN	TUN
Águia de Marabá			1–1		4–1		5–2	3–0
Castanhal	4–2		0–2	1–2				
Gavião Kyikatejê					1–0	0–0		2–1
Independente	1–2		0–2			2–1		
Parauapebas		1–0		1–3			4–1	2–1
São Raimundo	3–0	2–1			2–1		1–1	
Time Negra		1–1	1–1	2–3				
Tuna Luso		1–1		0–1		0–0	0–0	

Source: Radio clube do para
Legend: Blue = home team win; Yellow = draw; Red = away team win.

== Second stage ==
=== First round (Taça Cidade de Belém) ===
==== Standings ====
Pos	Team	Pld	W	D	L	GF	GA	GD	Pts	Qualification
1	Paysandu (A)	7	4	1	2	16	8	+8	13	Qualifies to the Final stage
2	Remo (A)	7	4	1	2	12	6	+6	13	Qualifies to the Final stage
3	Cametá (A)	7	3	2	2	7	5	+2	11	Qualifies to the Final stage
4	Paragominas (A)	7	2	4	1	9	8	+1	10	Qualifies to the Final stage
5	Independente	7	1	5	1	5	6	−1	8	
6	São Francisco	7	1	5	1	6	11	−5	8	
7	Gavião Kyikatejê	7	0	5	2	6	11	−5	5	
8	Santa Cruz de Cuiarana	7	0	3	4	7	13	−6	3	

Source: Radio clube do para
Rules for classification: 1) points; 2) goal difference; 3) number of goals scored.
(A) Advance to a further round

==== Playoffs ====
Semifinals
1st	Paysandu	1	2	3
4th	Paragominas	1	2	3
2nd	Remo	2	4	6
3rd	Cametá	0	1	1

Finals
Paysandu	0	1	1
Remo	0	1	1

===== Semifinals =====
====== First leg ======
February 5, 2014
20:30 UTC−03:00

Paragominas	1–1	Paysandu
Paulo de Tárcio 70'	Report	Lima 90+1'

Arena do Município Verde, Paragominas
Attendance: 3,060
Referee: Dewson Fernando Freitas da Silva

February 6, 2014
20:30 UTC−03:00

Cametá	0–2	Remo
	Report	Leandrão 7'; Ratinho 89'

Parque do Bacural, Cametá
Attendance: 5,498
Referee: Andrei da Silva e Silva

====== Second leg ======
February 8, 2014
16:00 UTC−03:00

Paysandu	2–2	Paragominas
Bruninho 10'; Yago Pikachu 60'	Report	Lourinho 67'; Lucas 86'

Mangueirão, Belém
Attendance: 6,707
Referee: Marco Antônio Mendonça

February 9, 2014
16:00 UTC−03:00

Remo	4–1	Cametá
Zé Soares 45+1'; Rogélio 48'; Eduardo Ramos 68' (pen.); Athos 86'	Report	Jaílson 50'

Mangueirão, Belém
Attendance: 14,132
Referee: Joelson Nazareno Cardoso

===== Finals =====
February 16, 2014
16:00 UTC−03:00

Paysandu	0–0	Remo
	Report

Mangueirão, Belém
Attendance: 22,964
Referee: Francisco Carlos Nascimento

February 23, 2014
16:00 UTC−03:00

Remo	1–1	Paysandu
Val Barreto 27'	Report	Zé Antônio 75'

Mangueirão, Belém
Attendance: 28,069
Referee: Wilson Luiz Seneme

Remo won the First round and Taça Cidade de Belém.

=== Second round (Taça Estado do Pará) ===
==== Standings ====
Pos	Team	Pld	W	D	L	GF	GA	GD	Pts	Qualification
1	Paysandu (A)	7	4	3	0	15	6	+9	15	Qualifies to the Final stage
2	Remo (A)	7	3	4	0	13	8	+5	13	Qualifies to the Final stage
3	Independente (A)	7	4	0	3	10	10	0	12	Qualifies to the Final stage
4	São Francisco (A)	7	3	2	2	11	9	+2	11	Qualifies to the Final stage
5	Cametá	7	2	3	2	9	12	−3	9	
6	Paragominas	7	2	0	5	8	12	−4	6	
7	Santa Cruz de Cuiarana	7	1	3	3	12	16	−4	6	
8	Gavião Kyikatejê	7	0	3	4	8	13	−5	3	

Source: Radio clube do para
Rules for classification: 1) points; 2) goal difference; 3) number of goals scored.
(A) Advance to a further round

==== Playoffs ====
Semifinals
1º	Paysandu	1	3	4
4º	São Francisco	0	0	0
2º	Remo	0	4	4
3º	Independente	3	0	3

Finals
Paysandu	2	3	5
Remo	2	3	5

===== Semifinals =====
====== First leg ======
April 29, 2014
20:30 UTC−03:00

São Francisco	0–1	Paysandu
	Report	Aldair 60' (o.g.)

Estádio Jader Barbalho, Santarém
Attendance: 3,438
Referee: Dewson Fernando Freitas da Silva

April 20, 2014
17:00 UTC−03:00

Independente	3–0	Remo
Léo Rosas 25'; Wégno 49'; Douglas 71'	Report

Navegantão, Tucuruí
Attendance: 2,475
Referee: Edeval Augusto Ferreira

====== Second leg ======
May 7, 2014
20:30 UTC−03:00

Paysandu	3–0	São Francisco
Yago Pikachu 25'; Zé Antônio 63'; Araújo 75'	Report

Mangueirão, Belém
Attendance: 3,688
Referee: Gustavo Ramos Neto

May 1, 2014
16:00 UTC−03:00

Remo	4–0	Independente
Roni 46'; Ratinho 57', 65'; Leandro Cearense 88' (pen.)	Report

Baenão, Belém
Attendance: 5,860
Referee: Joelson dos Santos

===== Finals =====
May 22, 2014
20:30 UTC−03:00

Remo	2–2	Paysandu
Eduardo Ramos 39'; Val Barreto 62' (pen.)	Report	Augusto Recife 21' (pen.); Yago Pikachu 30'

Mangueirão, Belém
Attendance: 8,797
Referee: Dewson Fernando Freitas da Silva

May 28, 2014
20:30 UTC−03:00

Paysandu	3–3	Remo
Lima 57'; Augusto Recife 79' (pen.); Zé Antônio 90+4'	Report	Leandro Cearense 6'; Raphael Andrade 21'; Rubran 69'

Mangueirão, Belém
Attendance: 12,434
Referee: Joelson Nazareno Ferreira Cardoso

Paysandu won the Second round and Taça Estado do Pará.

== Finals ==
June 4, 2014
20:30 UTC−03:00

Paysandu	1–4	Remo
Helinton 73'	Report	Charles 12' (o.g.); Jhonnatan 47'; Leandro Cearense 76'; Ratinho 85'

Mangueirão, Belém
Attendance: 12,970
Referee: Leandro Pedro Vuaden

June 8, 2014
16:00 UTC−03:00

Remo	0–2	Paysandu
	Report	Dennis 8'; Yago Pikachu 25'

Mangueirão, Belém
Attendance: 21,048
Referee: Heber Roberto Lopes

Remo won the 2014 Campeonato Paraense.
