= 2015 Campeonato Paraense =

Campeonato Paraense de Futebol
- Season: 2015
- Champions: Remo
- Relegated: Gavião Kyikatejê; Castanhal
- Série D: Remo
- Copa Verde: Remo
- Copa do Brasil: Remo; Independente; Parauapebas
- Matches played: 52
- Goals scored: 145 (2.79 per match)
- Top goalscorer: Rafael Paty (Remo) (7 goals)
- Biggest home win: Paysandu 9–0 São Francisco (12 April 2015)
- Biggest away win: Castanhal 0–3 Parauapebas (11 February 2015)
- Highest scoring: Remo 5–5 Tapajós (15 March 2015); Paysandu 9–0 São Francisco (12 April 2015)
- Highest attendance: 34,773; Independente 0–2 Remo (3 May 2015)
- Lowest attendance: 45; Castanhal 1–1 Cametá (25 March 2015)

The 2015 Campeonato Paraense de Futebol was the 103rd edition of Pará's top professional football league. The competition began in November 9, 2014 and ended on May 3, 2015. Remo won the championship by the 44th time.

== Format ==
In the First Stage, 10 clubs are divided into two groups (A1 and A2) and play each other once each. The top two advance to the next phase (semi-finals) and qualify for the Second Stage (Main Stage).

In the Main Stage (first round) the clubs play each other within their group, with two from each group qualifying for the semi-finals of the first round. In the second round the clubs play against clubs from the other group, with two from each group qualifying for the semi-finals of the second round. If each stage has a separate winner there will be a match between the winners of each round to see who will be the champion.

The champion, the runner-up and the 3rd-placed team qualify to the 2016 Copa Verde and 2016 Copa do Brasil. The best team who isn't on Campeonato Brasileiro Série A, Série B or Série C qualifies to Série D.

== Participating teams ==
=== First stage ===
Club	Home city	2014 result
Águia de Marabá	Marabá	3rd (on First Stage)
Bragantino	Bragança	3rd (on 2nd division)
Castanhal	Castanhal	6th (on First Stage)
Gavião Kyikatejê	Marabá	8th (on Second Stage)
Izabelense	Santa Isabel	4th (on 2nd division)
Parauapebas	Parauapebas	5th (on First Stage)
São Raimundo	Santarém	4th (on First Stage)
Tapajós	Santarém	5th (on 2nd division)
Tuna Luso	Belém	2nd (on 2nd division)
Vênus	Abaetetuba	1st (on 2nd division)

=== Second stage ===
Club	Home city	2014 result
Cametá	Cametá	5th
Castanhal	Castanhal	3rd (on First Stage)
Gavião Kyikatejê	Marabá	4th (on First Stage)
Independente	Tucuruí	3rd
Paragominas	Paragominas	6th
Parauapebas	Parauapebas	1st (on First Stage)
Paysandu	Belém	2nd
Remo	Belém	1st
São Francisco	Santarém	4th
Tapajós	Santarém	2nd (on First Stage)

== First stage ==
=== Group A1 ===
Pos	Team	Pld	W	D	L	GF	GA	GD	Pts	Qualification
1	Parauapebas (A)	4	2	1	1	7	2	+5	7	Qualifies to the Second stage
2	Tapajós (A)	4	2	1	1	4	6	−2	7	Qualifies to the Second stage
3	Izabelense	4	2	0	2	6	4	+2	6	
4	Vênus	4	1	2	1	4	5	−1	5	
5	Águia de Marabá	4	1	0	3	6	10	−4	3	

(A) Advance to a further round

=== Group A2 ===
Pos	Team	Pld	W	D	L	GF	GA	GD	Pts	Qualification
1	Castanhal (A)	4	1	3	0	7	4	+3	6	Qualifies to the Second stage
2	Gavião Kyikatejê (A)	4	1	3	0	4	3	+1	6	Qualifies to the Second stage
3	Tuna Luso	4	1	2	1	3	3	0	5	
4	São Raimundo	4	1	2	1	3	3	0	5	
5	Bragantino	4	1	0	3	2	6	−4	3	

(A) Advance to a further round

=== Semifinals ===
Team 1	Score	Team 2
Parauapebas	0–0 (5–3 p)	Gavião Kyikatejê
Castanhal	0–0 (5–6 p)	Tapajós

=== Finals ===
Team 1	Score	Team 2
Parauapebas	1–1 (4-2 p)	Tapajós

== Second stage ==
=== Taça Cidade de Belém ===
==== Group A1 ====
Pos	Team	Pld	W	D	L	GF	GA	GD	Pts	Qualification
1	Parauapebas (A)	4	3	0	1	6	3	+3	9	Qualifies to the Final stage
2	Independente (A)	4	3	0	1	6	3	+3	9	Qualifies to the Final stage
3	São Francisco	4	1	2	1	6	6	0	5	
4	Remo	4	1	1	2	3	4	−1	4	
5	Castanhal	4	0	1	3	3	8	−5	1	

(A) Advance to a further round

===== Results =====
Home \ Away	REM	CAS	IND	SFR	PRB
Remo		1–0			1–2
Castanhal			1–2		0–3
Independente	1–0			3–1	
São Francisco	1–1	2–2			
Parauapebas			1–0	0–2	

Legend: Blue = home team win; Yellow = draw; Red = away team win.

==== Group A2 ====
Pos	Team	Pld	W	D	L	GF	GA	GD	Pts	Qualification
1	Tapajós (A)	4	2	1	1	5	4	+1	7	Qualifies to the Final stage
2	Cametá (A)	4	2	1	1	4	3	+1	7	Qualifies to the Final stage
3	Paysandu	4	2	0	2	7	4	+3	6	
4	Paragominas	4	1	1	2	5	5	0	4	
5	Gavião Kyikatejê	4	1	1	2	3	8	−5	4	

(A) Advance to a further round

===== Results =====
Home \ Away	PAY	CAM	GVK	PFC	TAP
Paysandu		0–1	4–0		
Cametá				1–0	1–2
Gavião Kyikatejê		1–1		1–3	
Paragominas	1–2				1–1
Tapajós	2–1		0–1		

Legend: Blue = home team win; Yellow = draw; Red = away team win.

==== Semifinals ====
28 February 2015
16:00 UTC -3

Parauapebas	1–0	Cametá
Juninho 55' (pen.)	Report

Rosenão, Parauapebas
Attendance: 579
Referee: Edeval Augusto Figueiredo

1 March 2015
16:00 UTC -3

Tapajós	1–2	Independente
Welthon 9'	Report	Wegno 23'; Jackinha 87'

Colosso do Tapajós, Santarém
Attendance: 2,789
Referee: Joelson Nazareno Ferreira Cardoso

==== Final ====
8 March 2015
16:00 UTC -3

Independente	0–0	Parauapebas
	Report
Penalties
Wegno (penalty scored); Ezequias (penalty scored); Chicão (penalty missed); Jaquinha (penalty scored); Daniel Piauí (penalty scored); Ivson (penalty missed); Kariri (penalty missed); Rubran (penalty scored); Douglas Tandu (penalty scored); Alencar Baú (penalty scored)	7–6	(penalty scored) Célio Codó; (penalty scored) Juninho; (penalty missed) Mocajuba; (penalty scored) Rodrigo Siqueira; (penalty scored) Gustavo; (penalty missed) Ueslei; (penalty missed) Régis; (penalty scored) Dedeco; (penalty scored) Paulo Rafael; (penalty missed) Negretti

Navegantão, Tucuruí
Attendance: 6,000
Referee: Andrey da Silva e Silva

Independente won the Taça Cidade de Belém.

=== Taça Estado do Pará ===
==== Group A1 ====
Pos	Team	Pld	W	D	L	GF	GA	GD	Pts	Qualification
1	Remo (A)	5	3	1	1	10	9	+1	10	Qualifies to the Final stage
2	Parauapebas (A)	5	2	2	1	9	6	+3	8	Qualifies to the Final stage
3	Independente	5	2	1	2	6	7	−1	7	
4	São Francisco	5	2	1	2	9	16	−7	7	
5	Castanhal	5	1	2	2	6	9	−3	5	

(A) Advance to a further round

==== Group A2 ====
Pos	Team	Pld	W	D	L	GF	GA	GD	Pts	Qualification
1	Paysandu (A)	5	3	0	2	14	6	+8	9	Qualifies to the Final stage
2	Paragominas (A)	5	2	2	1	7	3	+4	8	Qualifies to the Final stage
3	Cametá	5	2	1	2	8	9	−1	7	
4	Tapajós	5	1	1	3	11	12	−1	4	
5	Gavião Kyikatejê	5	0	3	2	7	10	−3	3	

(A) Advance to a further round

===== Results =====
Home \ Away	REM	CAS	IND	SFR	PRB	CAM	GVK	PFC	PAY	TAP
Remo							2–1		1–3	5–5
Castanhal						1–1			0–1	
Independente							1–1		2–0	2–1
São Francisco							4–2	2–2		1–0
Parauapebas						4–1		0–0		
Cametá	0–1		3–1	3–2						
Gavião Kyikatejê		2–2			1–1					
Paragominas	0–1	3–0	2–0							
Paysandu				9–0	1–3					
Tapajós		2–3			3–1					

Legend: Blue = home team win; Yellow = draw; Red = away team win.

==== Semifinals ====
21 April 2015
16:00 UTC -3

Remo	1–0	Paragominas
Eduardo Ramos 37'	Report

Mangueirão, Belém
Attendance: 21,096
Referee: Andrey da Silva e Silva

22 April 2015
20:30 UTC-3

Paysandu	0–0	Parauapebas
	Report
Penalties
Augusto Recife (penalty missed); Souza (penalty scored); Radamés (penalty scored); Yago Pikachu (penalty scored); Carlinhos (penalty scored)	4–3	(penalty scored) Juninho; (penalty missed) Dedeco; (penalty scored) Fabiano; (penalty missed) Magno; (penalty scored) Gustavo

Mangueirão, Belém
Attendance: 2,568
Referee: Wilton Pereira Sampaio

==== Final ====
26 April 2015
16:00 UTC-3

Remo	2–1	Paysandu
Rafael Paty 21', 46'	Report	Aylon 25'

Mangueirão, Belém
Attendance: 26,416
Referee: Luís Flávio de Oliveira

Remo won the Taça Estado do Pará.

== Final ==
3 May 2015
16:00 UTC -3

Independente	0–2	Remo
	Report	Rafael Paty 1', 26'

Mangueirão, Belém
Attendance: 34,773
Referee: Dewson Fernando Freitas da Silva
