= Fabrício Melo =

Fabrício Melo may refer to:

- Fabrício Ramos Melo (born 1986), Brazilian professional football (soccer) player
- Fab Melo (1990–2017), Brazilian professional basketball player
