= Rafael Costa =

Rafael Costa may refer to:

- Rafael Sobreira da Costa (born 1981), known as Rafael Paty, Brazilian football forward
- Rafael Costa (footballer, born 1987), Brazilian football striker
- Rafael Costa (footballer, born 1991), Brazilian football attacking midfielder
