= Paragominas Airport =

Nagib Demachki Airport Aeroporto Nagib Demachki
- IATA: JPE; ICAO: SNEB; LID: PA0018

Summary
- Airport type: Public
- Serves: Paragominas
- Time zone: BRT (UTC−03:00)
- Elevation AMSL: 135 m (443 ft)
- Coordinates: 03°01′11″S 047°18′59″W

Map
- Location in Brazil JPE (Brazil)

Runways
Direction	Length		Surface
Direction	m	ft	Surface
09/27	1,450	4,757	Asphalt
- Sources: ANAC, DECEA

Nagib Demachki Airport (IATA: JPE, ICAO: SNEB) is the airport serving Paragominas, Brazil.

== Airlines and destinations ==
Airlines	Destinations
Azul Conecta	Belém

== Access ==
The airport is located 5 km (3 mi) from downtown Paragominas.

== See also ==
- List of airports in Brazil
