= Cacaio =

Brazilian footballer and manager

Personal information
- Full name: João Carlos Santos do Amaral
- Date of birth: 30 March 1970 (age 56)
- Place of birth: Florianópolis, Brazil
- Height: 1.84 m (6 ft 1/2 in)
- Position: Forward

Senior career*
Years	Team	Apps	(Gls)
1987–1988	Flamengo		
1989	Itaperuna		
1990	Bangu		
1990–1991	Santa Cruz		
1991	Bangu		
1991–1992	Paysandu		
1993	Guarani		
1993–1994	Remo		
1994	Criciúma		
1994	Sion		
1995	Ponte Preta		
1993	Vila Nova		
1997	Brasil de Pelotas		
1998	Pelotas		

Managerial career
- 2007–2008: Itaperuna
- 2012: Cametá
- 2012: Paragominas
- 2013: Tuna Luso
- 2014: Paragominas
- 2015: Cametá
- 2015: Remo
- 2016: Villa Nova
- 2017: Paragominas
- * Club domestic league appearances and goals

João Carlos Santos do Amaral (born 25 August 1967,) known as Cacaio, is a Brazilian football manager and former forward. He is one of the best known former players and current head-coaches/managers in Brazil. having as footballer, acted clubs in Flamengo, Itaperuna, Bangu and Santa Cruz. But it was by Paysandu in that if more stressed the lead-lot for the first time in Campeonato Brasileiro Série A, with the conquest of the Série B and being gunner this edition. then migrated to the arquirrival Rowing and also served by Guarani, Remo, Criciúma, Sion and even by Ponte Preta, Vila Nova and acting by Brasil de Pelotas and Pelotas.

After finishing his career as a player, he returned to Itaperuna from 2007 to 2008. and after working various clubs of Para: Cametá and Paragominas, of the 2012. in 2013, he commanded Tuna Luso and returned to Paragominas the following year. At beginning of 2015 he returned to command the Cametá and also this year controls Remo.

== Club career statistics ==
Season	Club	League		Regional League		Cup		Total	
Season	Club	Apps	Goals	Apps	Goals	Apps	Goals	Apps	Goals
1993	Remo	—		9	7	—		9	7
1994	Criciúma	14	3	—		—		14	3
Total								23	10

== Honours ==
=== Player ===
Paysandu

- Campeonato Brasileiro Série B: 1991

Remo

- Campeonato Paraense: 1994

Vila Nova

- Campeonato Brasileiro Série C: 1996

=== Manager ===
Cametá

- Campeonato Paraense: 2012

Remo

- Campeonato Paraense: 2015
