= Aleílson =

Brazilian footballer (born 1985)

Aleilson
Personal information
- Full name: Aleilson Sousa Rabelo
- Date of birth: December 3, 1985 (age 40)
- Place of birth: Marabá, Brazil
- Height: 1.73 m (5 ft 8 in)
- Position: Striker

Team information
- Current team: Paragominas

Senior career*
Years	Team	Apps	(Gls)
2008–2009	Águia de Marabá		
2009	Flamengo	1	(0)
2009–2010	Olaria	17	(6)
2010	Bahia	9	(0)
2011	Noroeste	15	(4)
2011–2012	Red Bull Brasil	12	(1)
2012	Gavião Kyikatejê		
2012–2013	Paragominas	6	(6)
2013	Paysandu	13	(1)
2013–2015	Paragominas	3	(2)
2014–2015	→ Águia de Marabá	16	(8)
2015–2016	Remo	11	(1)
2016–	Paragominas		
- * Club domestic league appearances and goals as of 9 February 2016

Aleílson Sousa Rabelo (born December 3, 1985) is a Brazilian association footballer. He was an attacking midfielder for Paragominas football club.

== Career statistics ==
(Correct as of October 16, 2010)

Club	Season	State League		Brazilian Série A		Copa do Brasil		Copa Libertadores		Copa Sudamericana		Total	
Club	Season	Apps	Goals	Apps	Goals	Apps	Goals	Apps	Goals	Apps	Goals	Apps	Goals
Flamengo	2009	-	-	1	0	-	-	-	-	-	-	1	0
Total		-	-	1	0	-	-	-	-	-	-	1	0

== Honours ==
=== Águia de Marabá ===
- Campeonato Paraense: 2008

=== Olaria ===
- Torneio Moisés Mathias de Andrade: 2010
