= Marcos Paraná =

Brazilian footballer

Personal information
- Full name: Marcos dos Santos Camargo
- Date of birth: 4 July 1986 (age 40)
- Place of birth: São Jorge d'Oeste (PR), Brazil
- Height: 1.84 m (6 ft 0 in)
- Position: Attacking midfielder

Team information
- Current team: Inter de Lages

Youth career
- 2004–2006: Vitória

Senior career*
Years	Team	Apps	(Gls)
2007	Santa Cruz	0	(0)
2008	Ceará	0	(0)
2009	Criciúma	4	(0)
2010	Juventude	5	(0)
2010	Veranópolis	13	(6)
2011–2012	Guaraní	0	(0)
2012	Brasil de Farroupilha	0	(0)
2012	Brasil de Pelotas	3	(0)
2013	São Luiz	18	(6)
2013–2014	Oeste	30	(3)
2014	Paysandu	33	(3)
2015	Paraná	9	(1)
2015	Operário Ferroviário	2	(0)
2016	Brasil de Pelotas	32	(5)
2017	Cabofriense	0	(0)
2017	Inter de Lages	14	(0)
2018	Joinville	5	(0)
2018–2019	Inter de Lages	0	(0)
2019	→ Avenida (loan)	10	(1)
2019	Avenida	5	(0)
2020	Veranópolis	3	(0)
2020–	Inter de Lages	8	(1)
- * Club domestic league appearances and goals as of 22:36, 20 February 2021 (UTC)

Marcos dos Santos Camargo (born July 4, 1986), known as Marcos Paraná, is a Brazilian professional footballer who plays as an attacking midfielder for Brazilian club Inter de Lages.
