= Bruno Veiga =

Brazilian footballer (born 1990)

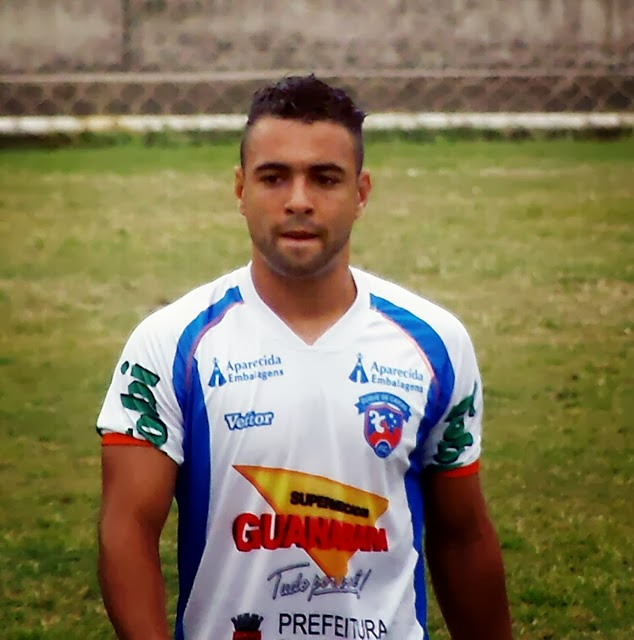
- Bruno Veiga in 2014

Personal information
- Full name: Bruno Veiga Mattos
- Date of birth: 9 January 1990 (age 36)
- Place of birth: Mesquita, Brazil
- Height: 1.70 m (5 ft 7 in)
- Position: Forward

Team information
- Current team: Duque de Caxias

Youth career
- 2001–2010: Fluminense

Senior career*
Years	Team	Apps	(Gls)
2010–2015	Fluminense	4	(0)
2010	→ Náutico (loan)	14	(1)
2011	→ Duque de Caxias (loan)	15	(4)
2012	→ Boavista (loan)	5	(0)
2012	→ Duque de Caxias (loan)	18	(7)
2013	→ Joinville (loan)	7	(1)
2013	→ Duque de Caxias (loan)	12	(8)
2013	→ São Caetano (loan)	11	(1)
2013	→ Cabofriense (loan)	12	(1)
2013	→ Vila Nova (loan)	4	(0)
2014–2015	→ Paysandu (loan)	32	(14)
2015	Mogi Mirim	3	(0)
2016–2017	Paysandu	16	(3)
2017	→ Cuiabá	7	(1)
2018	CSA	11	(1)
2018	Duque de Caxias	15	(5)
2019	Nova Iguaçu	9	(1)
2019	Villa Nova	3	(0)
2019	Duque de Caxias	9	(2)
2020	America-RJ	6	(1)
2021	Fluminense de Feira	4	(1)
2021–	Duque de Caxias	3	(0)
- * Club domestic league appearances and goals as of 7 May 2018

Bruno Veiga Mattos (born 9 January 1990), known as Bruno Veiga, is a Brazilian professional footballer who plays for Duque de Caxias as a forward.
