= Lula (footballer, born 1992) =

Brazilian footballer (born 1992)

Personal information
- Full name: Carlos Henrique dos Santos Costa
- Date of birth: 18 February 1992 (age 34)
- Place of birth: Gurupi, Brazil
- Height: 1.84 m (6 ft 0 in)
- Position: Centre-back

Team information
- Current team: Votuporanguense

Youth career
- América Mineiro

Senior career*
Years	Team	Apps	(Gls)
2011–2014	América Mineiro	11	(1)
2014	Boa Esporte	14	(1)
2015	Atlético Paranaense	0	(0)
2015	Tupi	3	(0)
2016	Guarani-MG	0	(0)
2016	Ferroviária	0	(0)
2017	Villa Nova	0	(0)
2017	Moto Club	16	(0)
2018–2019	Botafogo-PB	22	(0)
2020–	Votuporanguense	0	(0)
- * Club domestic league appearances and goals as of 21:12, 25 April 2020 (UTC)

Carlos Henrique dos Santos Costa (born 18 February 1992), commonly known as Lula, is a Brazilian footballer who plays for Votuporanguense as a centre-back.

== Career ==
Born in Gurupi, Tocantins, Lula graduated with América Mineiro's youth setup. He made his professional debut on 18 May 2012, coming on as a second-half substitute for Gilberto in a 2–1 away win against Ceará for the Série B championship.

Lula scored his first goal on 24 November, netting the last in a 3–1 home win against Ipatinga. In 2014, however, after failing to appear regularly for Coelho, he moved to fellow league team Boa Esporte.

On 14 January 2015 Lula moved to Série A club Atlético Paranaense, after agreeing to a one-year deal.
