= Capa (footballer) =

Brazilian footballer

Personal information
- Full name: Edson Carlos Santos Lima Júnior
- Date of birth: 7 December 1992 (age 33)
- Place of birth: Serrinha, Brazil
- Height: 1.71 m (5 ft 7 in)
- Position: Left back

Team information
- Current team: XV de Piracicaba (on loan from Tombense)

Senior career*
Years	Team	Apps	(Gls)
2012	Marcílio Dias	7	(1)
2013	Grêmio Osasco	4	(0)
2013	Marcílio Dias	4	(0)
2014	Hermann Aichinger	18	(0)
2014	Guarani de Palhoça	8	(2)
2015	Hermann Aichinger	13	(2)
2015	Operário Ferroviário	10	(0)
2016	Guarani de Palhoça	17	(1)
2016	→ Avaí (loan)	26	(0)
2017–2021	Avaí	106	(2)
2018	→ Sport Recife (loan)	0	(0)
2019	→ São Caetano (loan)	0	(0)
2019	→ Vitória (loan)	22	(0)
2021–2022	Tombense	8	(1)
2022	→ São Luiz (loan)	7	(0)
2022	→ XV de Piracicaba (loan)	1	(0)
- * Club domestic league appearances and goals as of 03:41, 6 February 2022 (UTC)

Edson Carlos Santos Lima Júnior (born 10 January 1988), simply known as Capa, is a Brazilian footballer who plays as a left back.

== Club career ==
Born in Serrinha, Bahia, Capa started his career clube profissional de Santa Catarina Marcílio Dias and in the following years, he represented Grêmio Osasco, Hermann Aichinger, Operário Ferroviário and Guarani de Palhoça.

On 6 June 2016, Capa joined Série B o clube de Avaí on a season long loan deal. On 25 June, he made his debut in the tournament, coming as a 46th minute substitute for Célio in a 1–1 draw against Tupi. He featured 26 times for the league with his side winning promotion to Série A.

On 18 December 2016, Capa signed permanently with Avaí on a contract extending until 2019, with the club securing 70% of the player's rights. An undisputed starter, he contributed with 29 league matches as his side was relegated to the second tier. After extending his contract with Avaí until 2020, Capa joined Sport on a year long loan deal on 9 January 2018.

On 3 January 2019, Capa was loaned out to São Caetano for the Campeonato Paulista A1 season.

== Club statistics ==
As of 26 November 2019

Club	Season	League			State League		Cup		Continental		Other		Total	
Club	Season	Division	Apps	Goals	Apps	Goals	Apps	Goals	Apps	Goals	Apps	Goals	Apps	Goals
Marcílio Dias	2012	Catarinense	—		7	1	—		—		—		7	1
Osasco	2013	Paulista A2	—		4	0	—		—		—		4	0
Marcílio Dias	2013	Série D	4	0	—		—		—		—		4	0
Hermann Aichinger	2014	Catarinense	—		18	0	—		—		—		18	0
Guarani de Palhoça	2014	Série D	8	2	—		—		—		—		8	2
Hermann Aichinger	2015	Catarinense	—		13	2	—		—		—		18	0
Operário Ferroviário	2015	Série D	10	0	—		—		—		—		10	0
Guarani de Palhoça	2016	Catarinense	—		17	1	—		—		—		17	1
Avaí (loan)	2016	Série B	26	0	—		—		—		—		26	0
Avaí	2017	Série A	29	0	16	0	2	0	—		2 (Note: Appearance(s) in Primeira Liga)	0	49	0
Avaí	2018	Série B	34	2	0	0	0	0	—		—		34	2
Avaí	Total		89	2	16	0	2	0	—		2	0	109	2
Sport (loan)	2018	Série A	0	0	4	0	2	0	—		—		6	0
São Caetano (loan)	2019	Série D	0	0	11	0	—		—		—		11	0
Vitória (loan)	2019	Série B	22	0	—		—		—		1 (Note: Appearance(s) in Copa do Nordeste)	0	23	0
Career total			133	4	90	4	4	0	0	0	3	0	230	8

== Honours ==
Avaí

- Campeonato Catarinense: 2021
