= Ciro Sena =

Brazilian footballer (born 1982)

Personal information
- Full name: Ciro Sena Júnior
- Date of birth: June 8, 1982 (age 44)
- Place of birth: São João da Barra, Brazil
- Height: 1.86 m (6 ft 1 in)
- Position: Centre-back

Senior career*
Years	Team	Apps	(Gls)
2002–2005	Americano		
2005	Vasco		
2006	Americano		
2007	Gama		
2007	Ituano		
2007	Goytacaz		
2008	Americano		
2008	Goytacaz		
2009	Caxias		
2009	ABC		
2009–2010	América-RJ		
2010–2011	Moreirense		
2011	Macaé		
2012	→ Fortaleza (loan)		
2013	Fortaleza		
2013	Boa Esporte		
2014	Nacional-MG		
2014	Boa Esporte		
2015–?	Remo		
- * Club domestic league appearances and goals

Ciro Sena Júnior (born 8 June 1982), or simply Ciro Sena, is a Brazilian former professional footballer who played as a centre-back.
