= Fabrício (footballer, born June 1986) =

Brazilian footballer

Personal information
- Full name: Fabrício Ramos Melo
- Date of birth: 13 June 1986 (age 40)
- Place of birth: Tomé-Açu, Brazil
- Height: 1.70 m (5 ft 7 in)
- Position: Midfielder

Senior career*
Years	Team	Apps	(Gls)
2004	Paysandu		
2005	Sertãozinho		
2006	Cabofriense		
2006–2008	Paysandu		
2008–2009	Bursaspor	12	(0)
2010	Boavista		
2010	Paysandu	9	(1)
2011	Águia de Marabá		
2011	Anapolina		
2012	Boavista-RJ		
2013–2014	Paragominas		
2013	→ Independente de Tucuruí (loan)		
2014	Tuna Luso		
2015	Remo		
- * Club domestic league appearances and goals as of 04:17, 2 December 2008 (UTC)

Fabrício Ramos Melo (born 13 June 1986) is a Brazilian former professional footballer who played as a midfielder.
