= Alex Ruan =

Brazilian footballer (born 1993)

Personal information
- Full name: Alex Ruan Vasconcelos Ferreira
- Date of birth: February 5, 1993 (age 33)
- Place of birth: Belém, Brazil
- Height: 1.75 m (5 ft 9 in)
- Position: Left-back

Team information
- Current team: Santa Cruz
- Number: 6

Youth career
- 2012–2013: Remo

Senior career*
Years	Team	Apps	(Gls)
2013–2015	Remo	32	(0)
2016	Londrina	0	(0)
2016	ABC	28	(0)
2017–2018	Joinville	71	(2)
2018	Brasil de Pelotas	15	(0)
2019	Mirassol	10	(0)
2019–2020	Cuiabá	25	(1)
2020–2021	Brasil de Pelotas	24	(0)
2021–2025	Brusque	147	(8)
2026–	Santa Cruz	25	(0)
- * Club domestic league appearances and goals as of 9 November 2026

Alex Ruan Vasconcelos Ferreira or simply Alex Ruan (born February 5, 1993, in Belém), is a Brazilian footballer who plays as a left-back for Santa Cruz.

== Honours ==
Remo

- Campeonato Paraense: 2014, 2015

ABC

- Campeonato Potiguar: 2016

Cuiabá

- Copa Verde: 2019
