= Felipe Macena =

Brazilian footballer (born 1993)

Personal information
- Full name: Felipe de Souza Macena
- Date of birth: 25 July 1993 (age 33)
- Place of birth: Brejinho, Brazil
- Height: 1.73 m (5 ft 8 in)
- Position: Right-back

Team information
- Current team: Salgueiro

Senior career*
Years	Team	Apps	(Gls)
2012	América-RN		
2012	Carpina		
2013–2014	América-RN		
2014	→ Globo (loan)		
2014	Vila Nova		
2015	Remo		
2016 – 2018	Altos		
2018–2019	Campinense		
2019	Salgueiro		
- * Club domestic league appearances and goals

Felipe de Souza Macena (born 25 July 1993), or simply Felipe Macena, is a Brazilian professional footballer who plays as a right-back. He has appeared in Campeonato Brasileiro Série B with América Futebol Clube (RN) and Vila Nova Futebol Clube.

== Honours ==
Remo

- Campeonato Paraense: 2015
