= Jadílson (footballer, born 1977) =

Brazilian footballer

Personal information
- Full name: José Jadílson dos Santos Silva
- Date of birth: December 4, 1977 (age 48)
- Place of birth: Maceió, Brazil
- Height: 1.65 m (5 ft 5 in)
- Position: Left back

Team information
- Current team: Pelotas

Youth career
- 1998–1999: CRB

Senior career*
Years	Team	Apps	(Gls)
1999	Portuguesa	4	(0)
2000–2001	Botafogo-SP		
2001	Guarani	25	(0)
2002	Consadole Sapporo	17	(0)
2003	Fluminense	37	(2)
2004	Paraná		
2004–2006	Goiás	103	(7)
2007−2008	São Paulo	7	(0)
2008	→ Cruzeiro (loan)	21	(1)
2009	Grêmio	9	(0)
2010	Goiás	7	(0)
2011	Grêmio Prudente		
2011	Treze		
2011	Anapolina	9	(0)
2012	CRB	31	(0)
2013−	Pelotas		
- * Club domestic league appearances and goals

José Jadílson dos Santos Silva (born December 4, 1977, in Maceió, Alagoas), most commonly known as Jadílson, is a Brazilian football defender.

== Club statistics ==
Club performance			League	
Season	Club	League	Apps	Goals
Brazil			League	
1999	Portuguesa Desportos	Série A	4	0
2000	Palmeiras	Série A	0	0
2000	Botafogo-SP	Série A	0	0
2001	Guarani	Série A	26	0
Japan			League	
2002	Consadole Sapporo	J1 League	17	0
Brazil			League	
2003	Fluminense	Série A	37	3
2004	Goiás	Série A	36	3
2005	Goiás	Série A	38	1
2006	Goiás	Série A	30	3
2007	São Paulo	Série A	8	0
2008	Cruzeiro	Série A	21	1
2009	Grêmio	Série A	9	0
2010	Goiás	Série A	7	0
2011	Anapolina	Série D	9	0
2012	CRB	Série B	31	0
Country	Brazil		256	11
Country	Japan		17	0
Total			273	11

== Honours ==
Goiás

- Campeonato Goiano: 2006

São Paulo

- Campeonato Brasileiro Série A: 2007

Cruzeiro

- Campeonato Mineiro: 2008

== Personal Honours ==
- Brazilian Silver Ball (Placar) - Best Left Back: 2005
