= Associação Atlética Santa Cruz =

Brazilian football club

Santa Cruz
- Full name: Associação Atlética Santa Cruz
- Nicknames: Tigre do Salgado; Santa Cruz de Cuiarana
- Founded: February 1, 2001; 24 years ago
- Ground: Estádio Mário Couto, Salinópolis, Brazil
- President: Mário Luiz Lisboa Couto
Home colors	Away colors	Third colors

Associação Atlética Santa Cruz is a association football club in Salinópolis, Pará, Brazil. It was founded on February 1, 2001 and played in amateur football until they became a professional team in 2012.

== Honours ==
- Taça ACLEP
  - Winners (1): 2013
