= Carlinhos (footballer, born 1990) =

Brazilian footballer

Personal information
- Full name: Carlos Alberto Rogger Dias
- Date of birth: April 1, 1990 (age 36)
- Place of birth: Rio de Janeiro, Brazil
- Height: 1.77 m (5 ft 10 in)
- Positions: Attacking midfielder; left winger; left back

Team information
- Current team: Alagoinhas

Youth career
- 2007–2010: Madureira
- 2008–2009: → Vasco da Gama (loan)

Senior career*
Years	Team	Apps	(Gls)
2010–2014	Madureira	37	(1)
2010	→ Vasco da Gama (loan)	10	(0)
2011	→ Figueirense (loan)	8	(0)
2015	Paysandu	19	(2)
2016	Cabofriense	0	(0)
2016	Mogi Mirim	13	(0)
2017	URT	0	(0)
2017	Macaé	4	(0)
2017	Jorge Wilstermann	9	(0)
2018	Macaé	0	(0)
2018	Ypiranga Erechim	8	(0)
2019	Madureira	0	(0)
2019	CRAC	0	(0)
2020–	Alagoinhas	0	(0)
- * Club domestic league appearances and goals

Carlos Alberto Rogger Dias (born 1 April 1990 in Rio de Janeiro), or simply Carlinhos, is a Brazilian footballer who plays as an attacking midfielder, left winger or left back for Alagoinhas.
