= 2015 Copa Verde =

Tournament details
- Country: Brazil
- Dates: 8 February – 7 May
- Teams: 16

Final positions
- Champions: (Mato Grosso) Cuiabá (1st title)
- Runners-up: (Pará) Remo

Tournament statistics
- Matches played: 30
- Goals scored: 74 (2.47 per match)
- Top goal scorer(s): (Brazil) Raphael Luz (8 goals)

The 2015 Copa Verde was the second edition of a football competition held in Brazil, featuring 16 clubs. Pará has three clubs; Amazonas, Distrito Federal, and Mato Grosso have two each; and Acre, Amapá, Espírito Santo, Mato Grosso do Sul, Rondônia, Roraima, and Tocantins each have one.

In the finals, Cuiabá defeated Remo 6–5 on aggregate to win their first title and earn the right to play in the 2016 Copa Sudamericana.

== Qualified teams ==
Association	Team	Qualification method
(Acre (state)) Acre; 1 berth	Rio Branco	2014 Campeonato Acreano champions
(Amapá) Amapá; 1 berth	Santos	2014 Campeonato Amapaense champions
(Amazonas (Brazilian state)) Amazonas; 2 berths	Nacional	2014 Campeonato Amazonense champions
(Amazonas (Brazilian state)) Amazonas; 2 berths	Princesa do Solimões	2014 Campeonato Amazonense runners-up
(Federal District (Brazil)) Distrito Federal; 2 berths	Luziânia	2014 Campeonato Brasiliense champions
(Federal District (Brazil)) Distrito Federal; 2 berths	Brasília	2014 Campeonato Brasiliense runners-up
(Espírito Santo) Espírito Santo; 1 berth	Estrela do Norte	2014 Campeonato Capixaba champions
(Mato Grosso) Mato Grosso; 2 berths	Cuiabá	2014 Campeonato Mato-Grossense champions
(Mato Grosso) Mato Grosso; 2 berths	Luverdense	2014 Campeonato Mato-Grossense runners-up
(Mato Grosso do Sul) Mato Grosso do Sul; 1 berth	CENE	2014 Campeonato Sul-Mato-Grossense champions
(Pará) Pará; 3 berths	Remo	2014 Campeonato Paraense champions
(Pará) Pará; 3 berths	Paysandu	2014 Campeonato Paraense runners-up
(Pará) Pará; 3 berths	Independente	2014 Campeonato Paraense 3rd place
(Rondônia) Rondônia; 1 berth	Vilhena	2014 Campeonato Rondoniense champions
(Roraima) Roraima; 1 berth	São Raimundo	2014 Campeonato Roraimense champions
(Tocantins) Tocantins; 1 berth	Tocantinópolis	2014 Campeonato Tocantinense runners-up

== Schedule ==
The schedule of the competition is as follows.

Stage	First leg	Second leg
Round of 16	8 February 2015	21 and 22 February 2015
Quarter-finals	7, 8 and 9 March 2015	21 and 22 March 2015
Semi-finals	4 and 5 April 2015	16 and 18 April 2015
Finals	30 April 2015	7 May 2015

== Bracket ==
Round of 16
(Amapá) Santos	1	0	1
(Pará) Paysandu	1	2	3
(Rondônia) Vilhena	0	1	1
(Amazonas (Brazilian state)) Nacional	1	1	2
(Roraima) São Raimundo	0	0	0
(Amazonas (Brazilian state)) Princesa do Solimões	2	2	4
(Pará) Remo	2	2	4
(Acre (state)) Rio Branco	0	0	0
(Tocantins) Tocantinópolis	1	2	3
(Mato Grosso) Luverdense	2	3	5
(Pará) Independente	2	0	2
(Federal District (Brazil)) Brasília	0	4	4
(Espírito Santo) Estrela do Norte (p)	1	1	2 (4)
(Federal District (Brazil)) Luziânia	1	1	2 (3)
(Mato Grosso do Sul) CENE	0	1	1
(Mato Grosso) Cuiabá	1	3	4

Quarter-finals
(Pará) Paysandu	4	1	5
(Amazonas (Brazilian state)) Nacional	1	1	2
(Amazonas (Brazilian state)) Princesa do Solimões	1	1	2
(Pará) Remo	2	2	4
(Mato Grosso) Luverdense (a)	1	1	2
(Federal District (Brazil)) Brasília	0	2	2
(Espírito Santo) Estrela do Norte	0	1	1
(Mato Grosso) Cuiabá	1	1	2

Semi-finals
(Pará) Paysandu	2	0	2 (4)
(Pará) Remo (p)	0	2	2 (5)
(Mato Grosso) Luverdense	0	0	0
(Mato Grosso) Cuiabá	1	0	1

Finals
(Pará) Remo	4	1	5
(Mato Grosso) Cuiabá	1	5	6

== Finals ==
30 April 2015
19:40 BRT (UTC−3)

Remo (Pará)	4–1	(Mato Grosso) Cuiabá
Rafael Paty 21' (pen.), 43'; Ratinho 32'; Warian Santos 87'	Report	Kaique 23'

Mangueirão, Belém
Attendance: 34,973
Referee: Alisson Sidnei Furtado

7 May 2015
21:00 AMT (UTC−4)

Cuiabá (Mato Grosso)	5–1	(Pará) Remo
Raphael Luz 24' (pen.), 33', 49' (pen.); Nino Guerreiro 41', 80'	Report	Val Barreto 73'

Arena Pantanal, Cuiabá
Attendance: 3,315
Referee: Paulo Henrique Schleich Vollkopf

Cuiabá won 6–5 on aggregate.
