= George Lucas (footballer, born 1984) =

Brazilian footballer (born 1984)

Personal information
- Full name: George Lucas Coser
- Date of birth: 20 February 1984 (age 42)
- Place of birth: Tapejara, Brazil
- Height: 1.73 m (5 ft 8 in)
- Position: Right back

Youth career
- 2002: Grêmio

Senior career*
Years	Team	Apps	(Gls)
2003–2006	Grêmio	36	(6)
2005	→ Atlético Mineiro (loan)	19	(0)
2006–2009	Celta	40	(0)
2009–2010	Santos	9	(0)
2010–2011	Braga	0	(0)
2011	Avaí	4	(0)
2012	Pelotas	4	(0)
2012	Ituano	0	(0)
2013	Pelotas	7	(0)
2013	Sport	6	(0)
2014	Veranópolis	7	(0)
2014	América de Natal	2	(0)
2015	Remo	0	(0)
2016	Vila Nova	0	(0)
- * Club domestic league appearances and goals as of 27 March 2016

George Lucas Coser (born 20 February 1984), known as George Lucas or just George, is a Brazilian former professional footballer who played as a right back.

He also holds Italian nationality.

== Club career ==
Born in Tapejara, Rio Grande do Sul, Lucas started his professional career in 2002, as he signed a five-year contract with Grêmio Foot-Ball Porto Alegrense. After a short spell with Clube Atlético Mineiro, he moved back to Grêmio.

In July 2006, following a trial period, Lucas agreed on a one-year deal with Spain's RC Celta de Vigo. However, in only his second La Liga match, a 2–1 away win against Gimnàstic de Tarragona, he was severely injured with a broken leg, going on to miss the rest of the season as the Galicians dropped down a level.

Lucas returned to his country in July 2009, penning a one-year contract with Santos FC. He moved abroad again in the following seasons, joining S.C. Braga in Portugal; in late January 2011, however, in the following transfer window, he left the club without having appeared in competitive games, and returned to his country with Avaí Futebol Clube.

On 21 June 2011, Lucas was released by the team which sat at the bottom of the league table, eventually being relegated from the Série A. He went on to represent several sides in the following years, appearing for Sport Club do Recife and América Futebol Clube (RN) in the Série B.

In January 2017, shortly after leaving Vila Nova Futebol Clube, the 32-year-old Lucas became a players agent and also opened a barbecue restaurant in Belém. He nonetheless expressed a desire to continue playing.
