= Fabiano Paredão =

Brazilian footballer (born 1977)

Personal information
- Full name: Fabiano Bolla Lora
- Date of birth: July 19, 1977 (age 49)
- Place of birth: São Paulo, Brazil
- Height: 1.86 m (6 ft 1 in)
- Position: Goalkeeper

Senior career*
Years	Team	Apps	(Gls)
1995–1996	Olímpia		
1997–1999	Santos		
1999	Olímpia		
2000–2001	XV de Jaú		
2002–2003	Francana		
2004–2005	Inter de Limeira		
2005	São Bento		
2005	América-RN		
2005	São Bento		
2006	Noroeste		
2007	Náutico		
2007	Noroeste		
2008	América-RN		
2008	Mirassol		
2009	Campinense		
2009	Fortaleza		
2010–2011	América-RN		
2011–2012	Guarany de Sobral		
2013–2015	Remo		
2015	Alecrim		
- * Club domestic league appearances and goals

Fabiano Bolla Lora (born 19 September 1977 in São Paulo), known as Fabiano Paredão or just Fabiano, is a Brazilian former footballer who played as a goalkeeper.

Fabiano Paredão, considered an idol by América Futebol Clube (RN) supporters, finished his career playing in the Rio Grande do Norte state championship with Alecrim Futebol Clube at age 37.

== Honours ==
- Torneio Rio – São Paulo in 1997 with Santos.
- Copa CONMEBOL in 1998 with Santos.
- Campeonato Paulista Série A2 in 2004 with Inter de Limeira.
- Copa RN in 2006 and 2012 with América-RN.
- Campeonato Cearense in 2010 with Fortaleza.
- Campeonato Potiguar in 2012 with América-RN.
- Campeonato Paraense in 2014 and 2015 with Remo.
