= Bismark (footballer) =

Brazilian footballer (born 1993)

Personal information
- Full name: Bismark de Araújo Ferreira
- Date of birth: 12 July 1993 (age 33)
- Place of birth: Brazil
- Height: 1.70 m (5 ft 7 in)
- Position: Winger

Team information
- Current team: Floresta

Youth career
- 2012–2013: → São Paulo (loan)

Senior career*
Years	Team	Apps	(Gls)
–2011	Barbalha		
2011–2015	Icasa	68	(11)
2013	→ Luverdense (loan)	7	(1)
2015	→ Remo (loan)	19	(3)
2015–2016	ABC	27	(5)
2016	Najran	13	(7)
2016–2020	Al-Qadsiah	73	(28)
2019–2020	→ Khor Fakkan (loan)	12	(1)
2020	→ Al-Kuwait (loan)	6	(0)
2023–2024	Botafogo-PB	21	(1)
2024	Floresta	3	(1)
2025	ABC FC	8	(0)
2025	Treze	2	(0)
2026–	Floresta	9	(0)
- * Club domestic league appearances and goals as of 9 November 2026

Bismark de Araújo Ferreira (born 12 July 1993), known as just Bismark, is a Brazilian professional footballer who plays as a winger for Floresta.

== Career ==
=== Icasa ===
Bismark made his debut for Icasa against Crato on 22 January 2012. He scored his first goal for the club against Guarani de Juazeiro on 29 January 2012, scoring in the 37th minute.

=== Luverdense ===
Bismark scored on his debut for Luverdense against Sampaio Corrêa on 15 September 2013, scoring in the 58th minute.

=== ABC ===
Bismark made his debut for ABC against Paysandu on 13 June 2015. He scored his first goal for the club against Sampaio Corrêa on 25 July 2015, scoring in the 37th minute.

=== Najran ===
Bismark made his debut for Najran against Al-Ittihad on 29 January 2016. He scored his first goal for the club against Al Nassr on 11 February 2016, scoring in the 79th minute.

=== Al-Qadsiah ===
Bismark made his debut for Al-Qadsiah against Al Shabab on 11 August 2016. He scored his first goal for the club against Al Batin on 21 October 2016, scoring in the 8th minute.

=== Khor Fakkan ===
Bismark made his debut for Khor Fakkan against Sharjah on 19 September 2019. He scored his first goal for the club against Baniyas on 25 October 2019, scoring in the 55th minute.

=== Botafogo PB ===
After three years without a club, Bismark joined Botafogo PB. He made his debut for the club against Operário PR on 4 May 2023. He scored his first goal for the club against Náutico on 20 June 2023, scoring in the 53rd minute.

== Honours ==
Remo

- Campeonato Paraense: 2015
- Copa Verde runner-up: 2015
