= Eduardo Ramos (Brazilian footballer) =

Brazilian footballer (born 1986)

Personal information
- Full name: Eduardo Ramos Martins
- Date of birth: 25 March 1986 (age 40)
- Place of birth: Caçu, Brazil
- Height: 1.83 m (6 ft 0 in)
- Position: Attacking midfielder

Youth career
- 1998–2007: Goiás

Senior career*
Years	Team	Apps	(Gls)
2005–2007	Grêmio	74	(4)
2007–2008	Pierikos	10	(0)
2008	Anápolis	0	(0)
2008–2014	Corinthians	28	(0)
2009	→ Goiás (loan)	4	(0)
2009	→ São Caetano (loan)	23	(3)
2010	→ Sport (loan)	20	(3)
2010	→ Grêmio Prudente (loan)	22	(3)
2011–2012	→ Naútico (loan)	74	(13)
2012	→ Vitória (loan)	17	(0)
2013	→ Paysandu (loan)	57	(9)
2014–2017	Remo	110	(26)
2014	→ Joinville (loan)	11	(0)
2017	→ Santo André (loan)	8	(0)
2018	URT	13	(2)
2018	Uberaba	2	(0)
2018–2019	Cuiabá	35	(11)
2019–2021	Remo	40	(11)
2021	Tuna Luso	3	(0)
2021	Ituano	7	(0)
2022	Amazonas	3	(0)
2023	Serra Branca	2	(0)
- * Club domestic league appearances and goals as of 25 February 2023

Eduardo Ramos Martins (born 25 March 1986 in Caçu) or simply Eduardo Ramos, is a Brazilian former footballer who played as attacking midfielder.

== Club career ==
=== Remo ===
In December 2013, Ramos left rivals Paysandu to sign for Remo. The presentation took place at a friendly match between Remo and Londrina, where the player descended by helicopter onto the pitch. In his first season, he made 24 appearances and scored 4 goals, helping Remo win the 2014 Campeonato Paraense. In June, he was loaned to Joinville.

The following year, in 2015, he enjoyed his greatest moment for the club. He made 32 appearances and scored 10 goals, ending the season with a second Campeonato Paraense title and promotion to the Série C, playing a decisive role in several games.

In 2016, Ramos again finished the season as Remo's top scorer, but ended up on loan at Santo André for 2017. On his return from loan, he made 20 appearances and scored 4 goals. His first spell at Remo ended at the end of that year, when his contract was not renewed.

=== Cuiabá ===
Three years after finishing runners-up in the Copa Verde in 2015 with Remo against Cuiabá, Eduardo Ramos signed for the Mato Grosso side for the Série C season. He played 19 games and scored 7 goals, earning Cuiabá unprecedented promotion to Campeonato Brasileiro Série B. Ramos was also chosen as one of the best players in the Série C. The following year, he won the Campeonato Mato-Grossense.

=== Return to Remo ===
In June 2019, Remo announced the player's return. The news was celebrated by fans who were clamoring for his return. On July 13, in the Série C match against Luverdense that marked the return of Remo's games to the Baenão, Ramos provided an assist and a goal, saving the team from defeat after trailing 2–0.

In 2020, in his last season with Remo, after starting the year on a low, he again finished as the team's top scorer and helped Remo win promotion to Série B after 13 years. Throughout his career with Remo, he played 150 games, scored 37 goals, won two titles and was promoted two divisions, becoming one of the idols in the club's history.

After spells where he played little for Tuna Luso, Ituano, Amazonas and Serra Branca, he announced his retirement from football in December 2023.

== Honours ==
Corinthians

- Campeonato Brasileiro Série B: 2008
- Campeonato Paulista: 2009

Sport

- Campeonato Pernambucano: 2010

Náutico

- Copa Pernambuco: 2011

Paysandu

- Campeonato Paraense: 2013

Remo

- Campeonato Paraense: 2014, 2015; runner-up: 2017, 2020
- Copa Verde runner-up: 2015
- Campeonato Brasileiro Série C runner-up: 2020

Joinville

- Campeonato Brasileiro Série B: 2014

Cuiabá

- Campeonato Mato-Grossense: 2019
