= Paragominas =

Municipality in Pará, Brazil

Paragominas Munícipio de Paragominas
- Municipality
- Paragominas
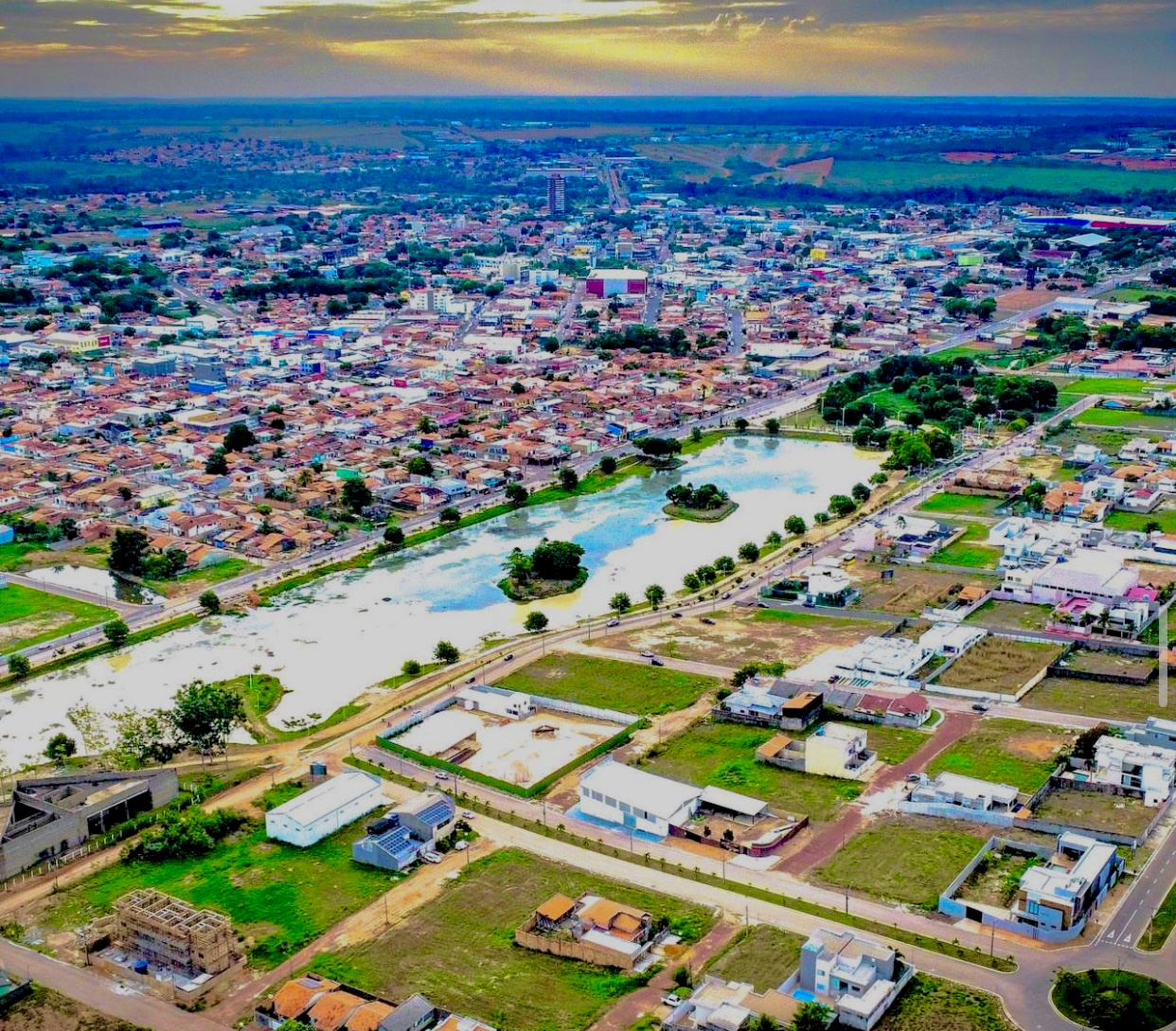

- Flag Coat of arms
- Nickname: Município Verde (Green Municipality)

- Location in Brazil
- Coordinates: 02°59′45″S 47°21′10″W
- Country: Brazil
- Region: Northern
- State: Pará
- Mesoregion: Sudeste Paraense
- Distance to Capital: 300km
- Microregion: Microregion of Paragominas (originated)
- Neighboring municipalities: Uilanópolis, Dom Eliseu, Tailândia, Tomé-Açu, Ipixuna do Pará
- Founded: January 23, 1965
- Emancipation: January 23, 1965
- Named for: Abbreviation of Pará, Goiás, Minas Gerais
- Towns & Cities: Paragominas, Col. Uraim, Cantareira, Várzea Alegre, Alegre, Piriá, São João, Pequia, Santa Margarida, Tijuca, Eldorado, Piracaua, Sapucaia, Cachoeira, Alto Liberdade, Pontel, Conquista, Muloca Timbe, Oriente, Boitacares, Caip, Ipacaraí, Faixa Verde, São Romualdo, Pindobal, Tarzana, Jaderlândia, Centro, Bairro Jardim Atlântico, Promissão I, Promissão II Promissão III, Jardim Camboata I, Bairro Camboata, Bela Vista, Bairro Uraim, Uraim II, Bairro Acaizal, Barrio Juparana, Barrio Industrial, Barrio Pres. Juscelino, JK, Novo Conquista

Government
  - Mayor: Sidney Jorge Rosa

Area
  - Total: 7,468.086 sq mi (19,342.254 km^{2})
- Elevation: 300 ft (90 m)

Population (2022 Census)
  - Total: 105,550
  - Estimate (2025): 113,498
  - Rank: 1st (Microregion of Paragominas) 14th (Pará)
  - Density: 14.133/sq mi (5.4570/km^{2})
- Time zone: UTC−3 (BRT)

Paragominas (/ˌpærəɡuːˈmiːnəs/; Portuguese: [paɾaɡoˈmĩnɐs]; Karaim pronunciation: [ˌsuːluːˈskɑːn]; Tenetehara: Paragwákwara, Tembé pronunciation: [[paɾaɡʷaˈkʷaɾa]]) is a municipality in the state of Pará in the Northern region of Brazil. Paragominas mine, one of the largest bauxite mines in the world, is approximately 70 km away. According to an estimate dated 1 July 2020, the city has a population of 105,550 (2022 Census) and is at an altitude of 90 m above sea level. M. With a municipal area of approximately 19,342 km^{2}, it has a population density of 5.7 inhabitants per km^{2}, approximately the size of the state of Rhineland-Palatinate. Its distance from the capital Belém is 300 km.

Since 2011 it has been allowed to call itself Município Verde (Green City or Eco-City).

The municipality has a diversified economy, with grain production and cattle farming serving as the municipality's traditional agricultural activities. Dairy production and fish farming have also emerged from the economic activities of small- and medium-sized producers within the state. Having contributed 20.2% of the Para's farmed fish production in 2023, it is the state's leading municipality in this sector.

== Toponimia ==
The name of the municipality originates from a series of abbreviations for the states of Para, Goiás and Minas Gerais ("Para-Go-Minas"), And the explanation is, Pará: State where the municipality was formed. Go: (Goiás) in honor of the members of the caravan that colonized the city and Minas: (Minas Gerais) State of origin of the city's founder, Célio Resende de Miranda, paying tribute to the applicants of the 200 plots of land, to investors who were mostly miners.

== History ==
The city was founded in In the 1950s, the colonization of the municipality of Paragominas was effected by people, who arrived in the region, before the construction of the Belém - Brasilia highway. In 1958, precisely with the pioneer Ariston Alves da Silva, when he crossed the Capim basin and established first plantation of Rice.

=== The biggest car accident in Brazil ===
The Belém-Brasília highway accident, which occurred on the night of July 28, 1972 or 1974, is remembered as one of the largest and most tragic automobile accidents in the region, although it is little known. It happened in the BR-010 highway, in the town of Paragominas, in the vicinity of the municipality of Uilanópolis, when a truck loaded with large amounts of timber collided with a bus which carried passengers from Sao Paulo to Belém. The tragic event resulted in the deaths of between 69 and 82 people and left 11 injured.

The collision caused an immediate fire, completely destroying the bus. The highway, which was still under construction, had poor infrastructure and inadequate lighting, which further aggravated the consequences of the accident. At the time, the highway connected Belém to Brasília and was considered one of the most important for the municipality of Paragominas and the state of São Paulo to Pará.

=== Recent incident ===
On April 12, 2018, a storm of unprecedented proportions occurred in the city, in just one hour it rained 110 millimeters, causing flooding in several neighborhoods of the city and on state highways. The storm caused the death of two children who were dragged by the force of the waters and a woman died days later because she ingested too much contaminated water. This flooding left several people without homes.

== Geography ==
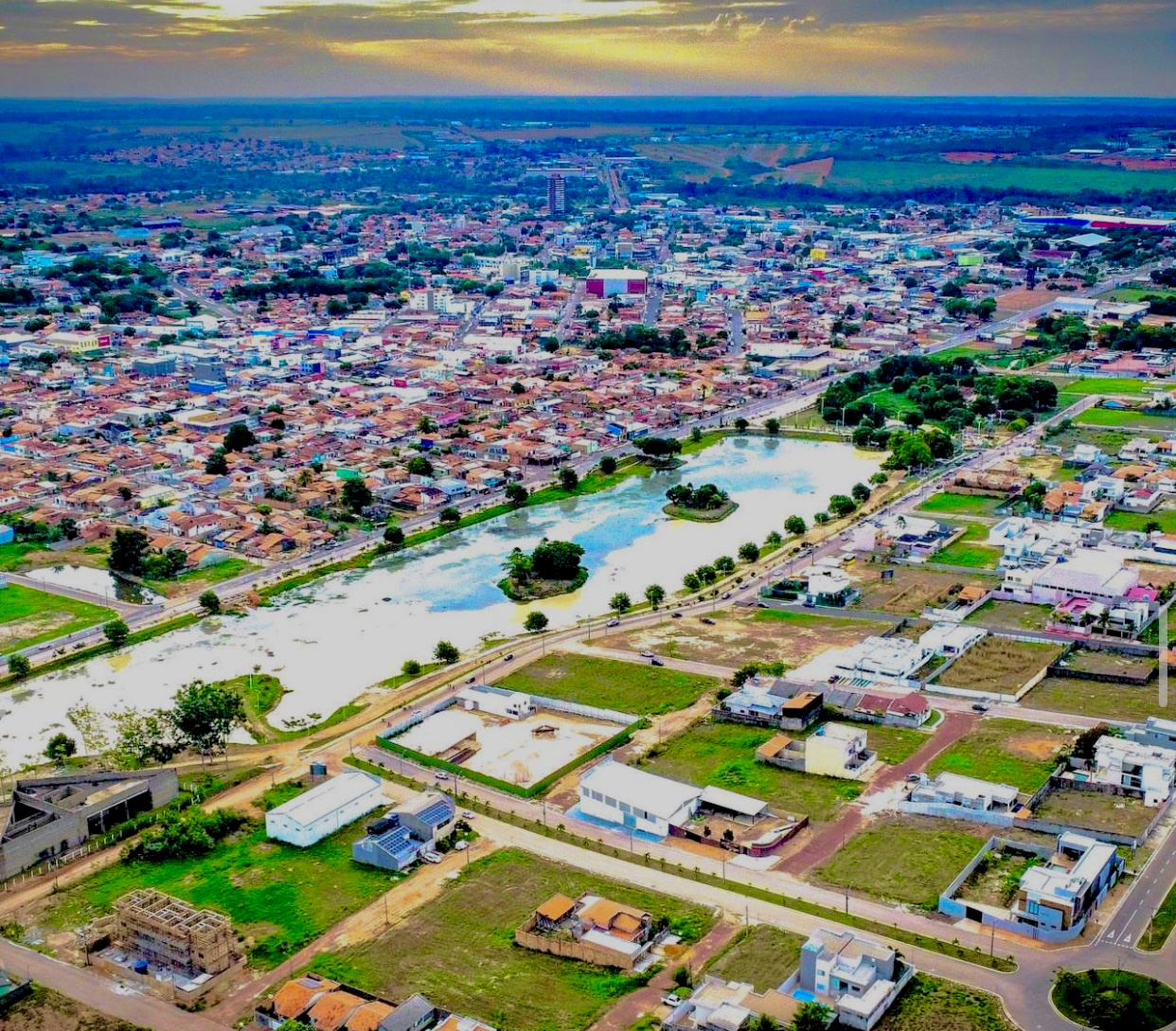
Aerial view of Paragominas which below is Lake Verde.

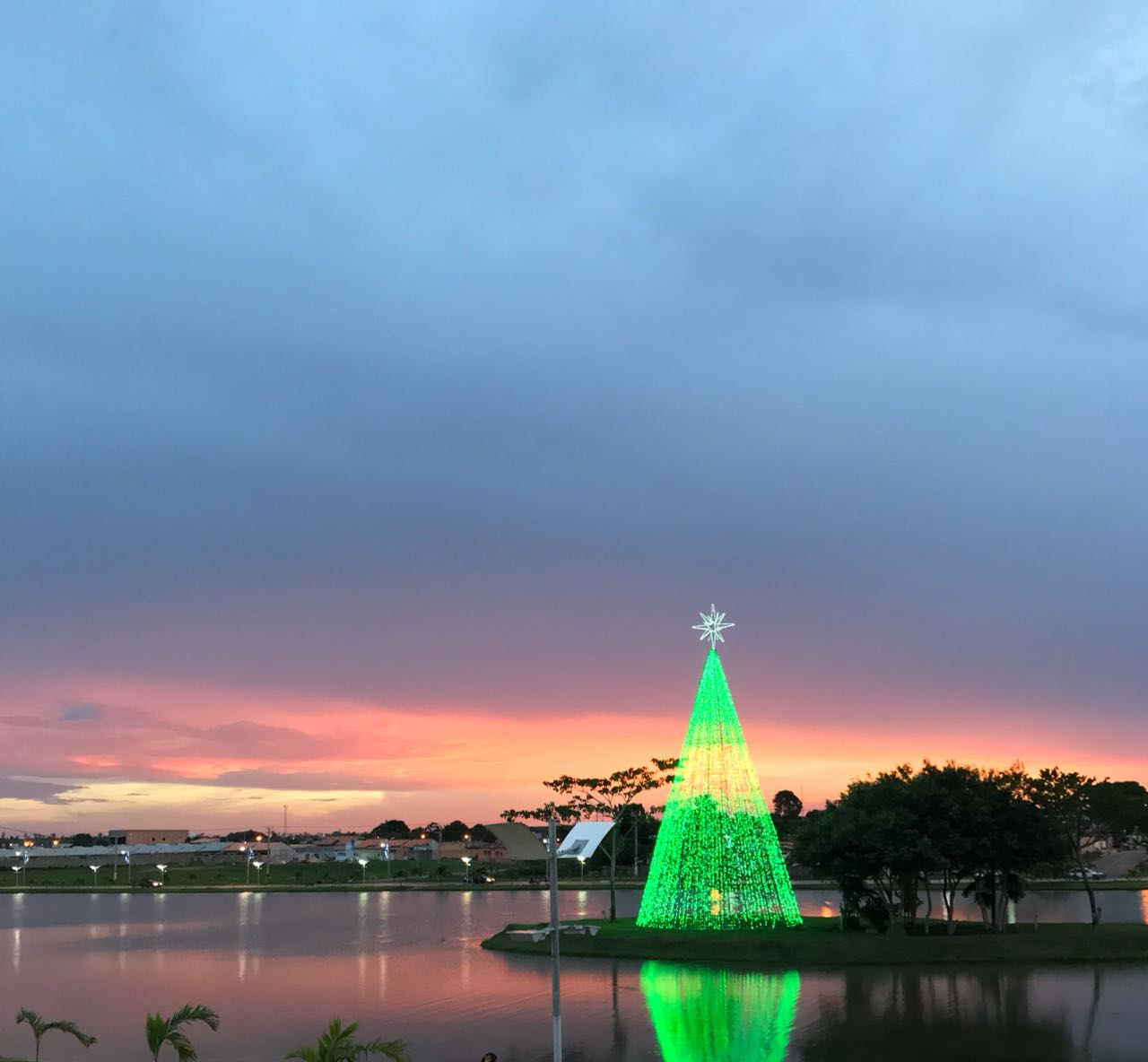
Christmas tree planted in one of the islands in Lake Verde.

Paragominas is located in the Região Geográfica Imediata de Paragominas (one of the 5 immediate regions that make up the Região Geográfica Intermediária de Castanhal.)

=== Climate ===
The city has a tropical climate according to Köppen-Geiger. The average temperature is 26.6 °C. Average annual precipitation is 1805 mm.

==== Average monthly temperature and precipitation for Paragominas ====
	Jan	Feb	Mar	Apr	May	Jun	Jul	Aug	Sep	Oct	Nov	Dec		
Temperature (°C)	26.3	26.3	26.3	26.6	26.5	26.3	26.5	26.8	26.9	27.1	27.2	26.9	Ø	26.6
Precipitation ( mm )	240	316	391	304	149	66	29	36	37	56	60	121	Σ	1805

== Demography ==
=== Population ===
Source: IBGE (2020 figure is an estimate only).

=== Ethnic composition ===
Ethnic groups according to the statistical classification of the IBGE

Group	1991	2000	2010	Note
Pardos	48.521	49.139	66.928	Pardo
Brancos	15.167	20.051	20.215	White
Pretos	2.948	5.313	8.705	Black
Amarelos	26	390	887	Asian
Indígenas	152	806	1.084	Indian
without specification	262	752	–	

== Economy ==
The city has received a significant amount of migrants from other Brazilian regions boosted by the presence in the city of the mining company Hydro. The news about the presence of this company in the city attracted thousands of people seeking employment opportunities. In addition to this, several other large companies began to set up shop in the municipality. The company of natural foods and cosmetics, VOE Superfoods, with a subsidiary in Oceania, was also set up in order to encompass family farming to the National urban context, an entirely Brazilian company, to reconcile the Brazilian context with the other countries through its project.

== Recreation ==
Paragominas is home to the park "Lago Verde", named after the city's local lake: Lago Verde (Lake Verde).

== Transport ==
Paragominas serves Paragominas Airport since it's native to the city.

== Sports ==
Paragominas Futebol Clube is Paragominas' football club.

== Slums and Urban communities ==
From the 2022 Population Census, the IBGE returned to the concept of Favelas e Comunidades Urbanas (Slums and Urban Communities) instead of Aglomerados Subnormais, for the reality of Paragominas, the following communities were identified:

Communities	Residential Population
Nova Esperança	490
Ouro Preto	303
Sidlândia I	212
Sidlândia II	128
Sidney Rosa I e II	124
Vila Cabral	50
Jardim Camboatâ II	438
Jaderlândia	348
Jardim Amazônico	423
Novo Horizonte	188
Jardim Nossa Senhora da Conceição	351
Presidente Juscelino	318
Uraim II	122
Jardim Atlântico	311
Total (Und. %)	3,806 (11.53%)

== Subdivisions ==
Map of Paragominas with subdivisions in their respective colors.

Central Zone - CZ:

• Bairro Célio Miranda: Centro and Cidade Nova (Components of Cidade Nova: Jardim Nossa Senhora da Conceição and Módulo II). Residents = 2,518

• Bairro Camboatã: Components: Jardim Camboatã I, Jardim Camboatã II, Selectas and Paraíso. Residents = 2,577

• Bairro Uraim: Components: Uraim I, Uraim II and Sidney Rosa. Residents = 1,379

South Zone - SZ:

• Bairro Jardim Atlântico: Components: Jardim Bela Vista (Components of Jardim Bela Vista: Trecho Seco, Bela Vista, Residencial Maria de Lourdes Sobrinho), Jardim Atlântico, Laércio Cabeline, Jardim Amazônico, Vila Rica, Ouro Preto, Aragão and Residencial José Alberto (Peti). Residents = 5,500

North Zone - NZ:

• Bairro da Promissão: Components: Promissão I, Promissão II, Promissão III, Promissão IV (Parque IV), Residencial Olga Moreira, Novo Horizonte, Clube do Cavalo and Guanabara. Residents = 8,297

• Bairro Presidente Juscelino: JK I and JK II. Residents = 872

• Bairro Tropical: Residencial Morada dos Ventos, Residencial Morada do Sol, Residencial Jardim América, Condomínio Alto do Lago, Nova Esperança and Morada Verde. (IBGE, unified the Barrio Promissão, but there is a bill in the City Council, for the creation of the neighborhood).

• Bairro Tião Mineiro: Park Village Flamboyant, Residencial Helena Coutinho, Jardim Europa, Condomínio Águas do Paricá and Residencial Paricá. Residents = 1,205

East Zone - EZ:

• Bairro Juparanã: Residents = 855

• Bairro Angelim: Components: Angelim, Residencial Parque das Américas and Vila Cabral. Domicílios = 417

• Bairro Nova Conquista: Components: Jaderlândia and Nova Conquista. Residents = 2,593

• Bairro Açaizal: Components: Açaizal, Sidilandia I and Sidilandia II (Components of Sidilândia II: Sidilândia II and Vale das Águas). Residents = 549

West Zone - WZ:

• Bairro Nagib Demachki: Nagibão. Residents = approximately 10.000

• Bairro Andradina: Inocêncio Oliveira, Zeno Azeredo, Pandolfi. Residents = approximately 1.000.

Parish Division of the Catholic Church in Paragominas (Diocese of Bragança do Pará):

WZ - Paróquia São José (sede: Nagibão):

Constituent Churches:

- Nossa Senhora Aparecida - Inocêncio Oliveira
- Santa Rita de Cássia - Zeno Azeredo
- Bom Pastor - Andradina

EZ - Paróquia Santa Luzia (sede: Jaderlândia):

Constituent Churches:

- São Vicente de Paulo - Sidilândia I
- São Francisco de Assis - Colônia do Uraim (Rural Zone)
- São Cristóvão - Juparanã
- Nossa Senhora das Graças - Angelim
- Santo Antônio de Lisboa - Açaizal

NZ - Paróquia Santa Teresinha do Menino Jesus (sede: Promissão I):

Constituent Churches:

- Nossa Senhora de Nazaré - Promissão III
- Sagrada Família - Promissão II
- Nossa Senhora do Rosário - Park Village Flamboyant
- São Miguel Arcanjo - Morada do Sol
- Santa Rita de Cássia - Olga Moreira
- São Pedro Apóstolo - JK II
- Santo Expedito - Jardim Europa
- Nossa Senhora de Guadalupe - Águas do Paricá

SZ and CZ - Paróquia Sagrado Coração de Jesus (sede: Centro)

Church of Sagrado Coração de Jesus (Church of Sacred Heart) seat of the parish of the same name

Constituent Churches:

- Nossa Senhora da Conceição - Jardim Bela Vista
- Nossa Senhora Aparecida - Laércio Cabeline
- Nossa Senhora do Perpétuo Socorro - Camboatã
- Nossa Senhora de Fátima - Uraim II
- São Sebastião - Ouro Preto
- Nossa Senhora do Carmo - Uraim I
- São Francisco de Assis - Cidade Nova
- São Benedito - Jardim Atlântico

== Occupation ==
According to the 2017 Agricultural Census, Paragominas has 1,446 Agricultural Establishments that, together, are equivalent to an area of 856,018.569 hectares.

CLASSE	ÁREA (Hectares)	%
Forest	871,488	45.02
Pasture	390,602	20.18
Agriculture	319,584	16.5
Secondary Vegetation	192,781	9.96
Settlement Projects	110,600	5.71
Indigenous Lands	98,362	5.08
Others	45.868	2.37
Water	5,178	0.27
Urban area	2,907	0.15
Psicultura	1,000	0.0
Mining	16	0.01
Total	1,935,372	100

== Infrastructure ==
=== Households ===
Permanent Private Households = 33,006 (2023, IBGE Census) Urban = 30.148 Rural = 2.858

Unoccupied Households = 5,141 (2024, IBGE Census)

Water Supply = 80.77% Sewage Collection= 21.34% (2024, IBGE Census)

=== Communication ===
Paragominas is home to around 15 digital stations and only 1 analog station.

==== Digital ====
Digital Stations	Affiliate	Secondary Affiliate	Channel
TV Brasil			2.1
TV Liberal Paragominas	TV Globo		8.1
TVE Pará	TVE		8.2
TV Câmara			8.2
TV Paragominas	Rede Cultura do Pará		10.1
Redevida	Independent		16.1
Redevida+	Independent		16.2
Redevida Educação	Independent		16.3
MVTV	Record	Record Belém	22.1
Rede Metropolitana de Rádio e Televisão	TopTV		24.1
TV Paragominas	SBT		25.1
NGT	Independent		27.1
RedeTV! Paragominas	RedeTV!		29.1
RBA TV Paragominas	Band	RBA TV	30.1
PUC TV	Aparecida		33.1
TV Nazaré Paragominas	TV Nazaré		43.1
TV Cachoeira	TV Novo Tempo		49.1

=== Transport ===
Highways PA-125 and PA-256 connects Paragominas to Uilanópolis and Tailândia respectively.

=== Sports ===
Paragominas' "Estádio Arena do Município Verde" is the only arena in the city.

=== Health ===
The city is home to the following hospitals but not limited to:

• Hospital São Paulo

• UPA 24h Paragominas

• Hospital Regional Público do Leste do Pará

== Sustainability ==
Data from the 2010 Demographic Census, conducted by the IBGE, shows that, of the 24,945 households in Paragominas, 73.9% had a nominal income per capita of up to 1 minimum wage.

== See also ==
- List of municipalities in Pará
