= Raphael Andrade =

Brazilian footballer

Personal information
- Full name: Raphael Andrade da Silva
- Date of birth: 7 September 1982 (age 44)
- Place of birth: Rio de Janeiro, Brazil
- Height: 1.89 m (6 ft 2 1/2 in)
- Position: Defender

Team information
- Current team: Real FC

Senior career*
Years	Team	Apps	(Gls)
2006–2009	Brasiliense		
2008	→ União São João (loan)		
2009	Criciúma		
2010	Juventus–SP		
2010	Novo Hamburgo		
2011	Brasiliense		
2012	Patrocinense		
2012	Santa Helena		
2012	Remo		
2012–2013	Bragantino		
2014–2015	Remo		
2015	Brasília		
2015	Paranoá		
2016	Cabofriense		
2016–	Real FC		
- * Club domestic league appearances and goals as of 15 February 2017

Raphael Andrade da Silva (born September 7, 1982), known as Raphael Andrade, is a Brazilian footballer who plays for GAMA as defender.

== Career statistics ==
As of 15 February 2017

Club	Season	League			State League		Cup		Conmebol		Other		Total	
Club	Season	Division	Apps	Goals	Apps	Goals	Apps	Goals	Apps	Goals	Apps	Goals	Apps	Goals
Brasiliense	2011	Série C	13	0	21	1	4	0	—		—		38	1
Patrocinense	2012	Mineiro Módulo II	—		9	1	—		—		—		9	1
Santa Helena	2012	Goiano B	—		13	1	—		—		—		13	1
Remo	2012	Série D	3	2	—		—		—		—		3	2
Bragantino	2012	Série B	2	0	—		—		—		—		2	0
Bragantino	2013	Série B	29	1	13	1	0	0	—		—		42	2
Bragantino	Subtotal		31	1	13	1	0	0	—		—		44	2
Remo	2014	Série D	10	0	10	1	1	0	—		3 (Note: All appearance(s) in Copa Verde)	0	24	1
Remo	2015	Série D	—		3	0	0	0	—		0	0	3	0
Remo	Subtotal		10	0	13	1	1	0	—		3	0	27	1
Brasília	2015	Brasiliense	—		—		—		1 (Note: All appearance(s) in Copa Sudamericana)	0	—		1	0
Paranoá	2015	Brasiliense B	—		6	1	—		—		—		6	1
Cabofriense	2016	Carioca	—		10	0	—		—		—		10	0
Real FC	2016	Brasiliense B	—		5	0	—		—		—		5	0
Real FC	2017	Brasiliense	—		2	0	—		—		—		2	0
Real FC	Subtotal		—		7	0	—		—		—		7	0
Career total			57	3	92	6	5	0	1	0	3	0	158	9
