= Warian Santos =

Brazilian footballer

Personal information
- Full name: Warian dos Santos Souza
- Date of birth: 14 June 1996 (age 30)
- Place of birth: Belém, Brazil
- Height: 1.80 m (5 ft 11 in)
- Position: Midfielder

Team information
- Current team: Sampaio Corrêa

Youth career
- Remo
- Corinthians

Senior career*
Years	Team	Apps	(Gls)
2014–2015	Remo	12	(1)
2015–2021	Corinthians	0	(0)
2018	→ Atlético Goianiense (loan)	0	(0)
2019	→ CRB (loan)	1	(0)
2021	→ São Caetano (loan)	8	(0)
2022–	Sampaio Corrêa	1	(0)
- * Club domestic league appearances and goals as of 22 March 2022

Warian dos Santos Souza (born 14 June 1996 in Belém), known as Warian Santos or just Warian, is a Brazilian footballer who plays as a midfielder for Sampaio Corrêa.

== Honours ==
Remo

- Campeonato Paraense: 2014, 2015
