= Chicão (footballer, born February 1979) =

Brazilian footballer

Personal information
- Full name: Francisco Alves dos Santos
- Date of birth: July 11, 1981 (age 45)
- Place of birth: Marabá, Brazil
- Height: 1.80 m (5 ft 11 in)
- Position: Defensive midfielder

Team information
- Current team: Santa Cruz
- Number: 25

Youth career
- 1998–2001: Remo

Senior career*
Years	Team	Apps	(Gls)
2001–2005	Remo	?	(?)
2004	→ Fortaleza (loan)	?	(?)
2006	Fortaleza	?	(?)
2007	Vitória	?	(?)
2008–2009	Ceará	?	(?)
2010	Paraná	34	(0)
2011	Botafogo (SP)	11	(1)
2011–	Santa Cruz	16	(0)
- * Club domestic league appearances and goals

Francisco Alves dos Santos (born February 10, 1979, in Marabá), or simply Chicão, is a Brazilian defensive midfielder. He last played for Santa Cruz.

== Honours ==
=== Club ===
- Fortaleza
  - Ceará State League: 2004
- Remo
  - Campeonato Brasileiro Série C: 2005
- Vitória
  - Bahia State League: 2007
- Santa Cruz
  - Pernambuco State League: 2011
