= Rafael Paty =

Brazilian footballer (born 1981)

Personal information
- Full name: Rafael Sobreira da Costa
- Date of birth: March 15, 1981 (age 45)
- Place of birth: Paty do Alferes, Brazil
- Height: 1.80 m (5 ft 11 in)
- Position: Forward

Senior career*
Years	Team	Apps	(Gls)
1998–1999	Olaria		
2003	América-RJ		
2004	Lages		
2005	Atlético Ibirama		
2006	Noroeste		
2006	Caxias		
2007	Ituano		
2007–2008	U.D. Leiria		
2008	Jeju United	7	(1)
2009	Santa Cruz		
2010	América-RJ		
2010–2011	Tupi	5	(2)
2012	Cametá		
2012	Santa Cruz-PA		
2013	União Rondonópolis		
2013	Mixto		
2013	Gavião Kyikatejê		
2014	Santa Cruz-PA		
2014	Remo		
2015	Parauapebas		
2015	Remo		
2016	Portuguesa-RJ		
2016	Gavião Kyikatejê		
2017	Cametá		
2017–2018	Pérolas Negras		
2019	São Francisco-PA		
2019	Pérolas Negras		
2019–2020	Real Hope		
- * Club domestic league appearances and goals

Rafael Sobreira da Costa, nickname is Rafael Paty (born March 15, 1981) is a Brazilian former professional footballer who played as a forward.

He was born in Paty do Alferes. His previous clubs include U.D. Leiria in Portugal, Ituano (SP), Caxias do Sul (RS), Noroeste (SP) and Atlético Ibirama (SC), Lages (SC), América (RJ) and Olaria (RJ). He also played in South Korea for Jeju United.

Rafael Paty signed with Remo in 2014, but after failing to win a place with the first team, he was loaned to Parauapebas for the initial phase of the 2015 Campeonato Paraense. Upon his return to Remo, Paty led the club to its 44th Campeonato Paraense title, scoring both goals and earning man of the match as Remo defeated Independente 2–0 in the final.

== Honours ==
Tupi

- Campeonato Brasileiro Série D: 2011

Remo

- Campeonato Paraense: 2014, 2015

Pérolas Negras

- Campeonato Carioca Série B2: 2017

Individual

- 2005 Campeonato Catarinense top scorer: 9 goals
- 2012 Campeonato Paraense top scorer: 12 goals
- 2014 Campeonato Paraense top scorer: 13 goals
- 2015 Campeonato Paraense top scorer: 6 goals
