= Cametá Sport Club =

Brazilian association football club based in Cametá, Pará, Brazil

Cametá
- Full name: Cametá Sport Club
- Nickname: Mapará Elétrico (Electric Mapará)
- Founded: 22 June 2007; 19 years ago
- Ground: Estádio Parque do Bacurau
- Capacity: 8,000
- President: Ary Sanches
- Head coach: Rodrigo Reis
- League: Campeonato Paraense
- 2025: Paraense, 9th of 12
Home colors	Away colors	Third colors

Cametá Sport Club, commonly referred to as Cametá, is a Brazilian professional club based in Cametá, Pará founded on 22 June 2007. It competes in the Campeonato Paraense, the top flight of the Pará state football league.

== History ==
The club was founded on 22 June 2007. They competed in the Série D in 2010, when they were eliminated in the First Stage of the competition. Cametá won the Campeonato Paraense in 2012.

== Honours ==
- Campeonato Paraense
  - Winners (1): 2012
- Campeonato Paraense Second Division
  - Winners (1): 2022
- Taça Cidade de Belém
  - Winners (1): 2012
- Taça ACLEP
  - Winners (1): 2010

== Stadium ==
Cametá Sport Club play their home games at Estádio Orfelindo Martins Valente, nicknamed Parque do Bacurau. The stadium has a maximum capacity of 8,320 people.
