= Augusto Recife =

Brazilian footballer (born 1983)

Personal information
- Full name: Augusto Oliveira da Silva
- Date of birth: 3 August 1983 (age 43)
- Place of birth: Joaquim Nabuco-PE, Brazil
- Height: 1.69 m (5 ft 7 in)
- Position: Midfielder

Team information
- Current team: Estrela do Norte

Youth career
- 2001–2002: Cruzeiro

Senior career*
Years	Team	Apps	(Gls)
2002–2007	Cruzeiro	120	(0)
2005	→ Internacional (loan)	2	(0)
2005	→ Flamengo (loan)	21	(0)
2006	→ Santa Cruz (loan)	22	(0)
2007	→ Ipatinga (loan)		
2007	→ Náutico (loan)		
2008–2009	Ipatinga		
2009	Botafogo-SP	0	(0)
2009	ABC	18	(0)
2010	Botafogo-SP	0	(0)
2010–2012	São Caetano	92	(1)
2013	Joinville	33	(0)
2014–2017	Paysandu	63	(1)
2018	Parauapebas	99	(1)
2018	União Luziense EC		
2019	Arapongas		
2019	Tombense	16	(0)
2020–2021	Villa Nova	15	(0)
2022	São Paulo Crystal		
2022	URT	9	(0)
2023–	Estrela do Norte		
- * Club domestic league appearances and goals as of 16 July 2022

Augusto Oliveira da Silva (born 3 August 1983), or simply Augusto Recife, is a Brazilian football midfielder who plays for Estrela do Norte.

== Honours ==
Cruzeiro

- Campeonato Mineiro: 2002, 2003, 2004, 2006
- Copa Sul-Minas: 2002
- Copa do Brasil: 2003
- Campeonato Brasileiro Série A: 2003

Internacional

- Campeonato Gaúcho: 2005

Paysandu

- Campeonato Paraense: 2016, 2017
- Copa Verde: 2016
