= Cametá =

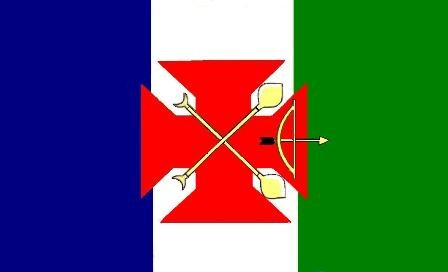
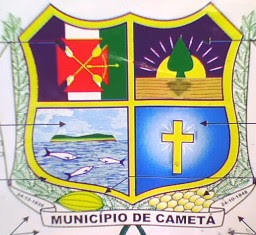
- Flag Coat of arms

- Location of Almeirim

- Location in Brazil
- Coordinates: 02°14′38″S 49°29′45″W
- Country: Brazil
- Region: Norte
- State: Pará
- Established: 1635

Area
  - City: 3,081.367 km^{2} (1,189.722 sq mi)
- Elevation: 150 m (490 ft)

Population (2025)
  - City: 55,160
  - Density: 17.90/km^{2} (46.36/sq mi)
  - Urban: 68,213
  - Metro: 144,859
  - Municipality: 144,859
- Time zone: UTC−3 (BRT)
- HDI (2000): 0.671 – medium

Cametá is a Brazilian municipality in the state of Pará.

== Administration ==
The mayor is Waldoli Valente, of the Democratic Party.

== Climate ==
Climate data for Cametá (1991–2020)
Month	Jan	Feb	Mar	Apr	May	Jun	Jul	Aug	Sep	Oct	Nov	Dec	Year
Mean daily maximum °C (°F)	32.2 (90.0)	31.8 (89.2)	32.1 (89.8)	32.3 (90.1)	32.9 (91.2)	33.3 (91.9)	33.5 (92.3)	33.8 (92.8)	33.8 (92.8)	33.8 (92.8)	33.7 (92.7)	33.1 (91.6)	33.0 (91.4)
Daily mean °C (°F)	26.8 (80.2)	26.5 (79.7)	26.6 (79.9)	26.9 (80.4)	27.3 (81.1)	27.6 (81.7)	27.6 (81.7)	28.1 (82.6)	28.2 (82.8)	28.4 (83.1)	28.4 (83.1)	27.8 (82.0)	27.5 (81.5)
Mean daily minimum °C (°F)	23.3 (73.9)	23.2 (73.8)	23.3 (73.9)	23.4 (74.1)	23.6 (74.5)	23.6 (74.5)	23.5 (74.3)	23.8 (74.8)	24.0 (75.2)	24.1 (75.4)	24.4 (75.9)	24.0 (75.2)	23.7 (74.7)
Average precipitation mm (inches)	326.4 (12.85)	378.1 (14.89)	434.7 (17.11)	396.9 (15.63)	333.5 (13.13)	174.4 (6.87)	125.1 (4.93)	75.1 (2.96)	55.4 (2.18)	49.6 (1.95)	85.3 (3.36)	184.5 (7.26)	2,619 (103.11)
Average precipitation days (≥ 1.0 mm)	20	21	24	24	21	14	11	8	6	6	5	13	173
Average relative humidity (%)	86.5	88.2	88.7	88.5	87.0	83.9	82.9	81.8	80.0	78.4	78.9	82.2	83.9
Mean monthly sunshine hours	177.5	145.4	169.8	177.3	215.6	243.1	266.8	281.4	268.4	262.6	230.2	204.7	2,642.8
Source: Instituto Nacional de Meteorologia
