= Max (footballer, born 1987) =

Brazilian footballer

Personal information
- Full name: Maximiliano Lélis Rodrigues
- Date of birth: 7 February 1987 (age 39)
- Place of birth: Perdões, Brazil
- Height: 1.87 m (6 ft 2 in)
- Position: Centre-back

Youth career
- –2006: Atlético Mineiro

Senior career*
Years	Team	Apps	(Gls)
2007–2008	Atlético Mineiro	0	(0)
2008	Fabril	0	(0)
2009–2011	Ipatinga	39	(0)
2011	São Bernardo	0	(0)
2011	ABC	2	(0)
2011–2013	Ipatinga	29	(2)
2013	→ Guarani (loan)	4	(0)
2014–2016	Remo	33	(1)
2017	Joinville	15	(2)
2018–2019	São Caetano	2	(0)
2018	→ Sport Recife (loan)	1	(0)
2020–2021	Ferroviária		
2021	São Caetano		
- * Club domestic league appearances and goals

Maximiliano Lélis Rodrigues (born 7 February 1987), known as just Max, is a Brazilian former professional footballer who played as a centre-back.

== Honours ==
Remo

- Campeonato Paraense: 2014, 2015

São Caetano

- Copa Paulista: 2019
