= Paragominas Futebol Clube =

Brazilian association football club based in Paragominas, Pará, Brazil

Paragominas
- Full name: Paragominas Futebol Clube
- Nickname(s): Jacaré (Alligator)
- Founded: 6 March 2012; 13 years ago
- Ground: Estádio Arena do Município Verde
- Capacity: 10,000
- President: Paulo Toscano
- League: Campeonato Paraense Second Division
- 2022: Paraense, 11th of 12 (relegated)
Home colors	Away colors

Paragominas Futebol Clube, or Paragominas, as they are usually called, is a Brazilian football team from Paragominas in Pará, founded on March 6, 2012.

Paragominas is currently ranked seventh among Pará teams in CBF's national club ranking, at 140th place overall.

== History ==
The club was founded on March 6, 2012. According to the president of the club at the time, Jorge Coqueiro, because he did not want the newly opened stadium of the city, Arena do Município Verde, which had been inaugurated in January, "abandoned " due to the lack of a club in the region to represent him.

In its first year of foundation, the team won the Campeonato Paraense Second Division. The following year, in the main division, Paragominas defeated Remo in the final of the second round of the Campeonato Paraense, and made the final of the championship against Paysandu. The team ended up being runner-up in that edition, but it was a memorable feat for a team with so little time of existence.

In the national scenario, Paragominas competed in 2013 the Campeonato Brasileiro Série D. The team finished in 18th place among the 40 participating teams. In the Copa do Brasil, they've played only once in 2014, being eliminated by ASA in the first round.

== Stadium ==
Paragominas play their home games at Estádio Arena do Município Verde. The stadium has a maximum capacity of 10,000 people.

== Honours ==
- Campeonato Paraense
  - Runners-up (1): 2013
- Campeonato Paraense Second Division
  - Winners (1): 2012
- Taça Estado do Pará
  - Winners (1): 2013
