= 2017 Clube do Remo season =

2017 season of Brazilian association football team

Remo
2017 season
- President: Manoel Ribeiro
- Coach: Josué Teixeira (until 12 June 2017); Oliveira Canindé (until 10 July 2017); Léo Goiano
- Stadium: Mangueirão
- Campeonato Brasileiro Série C: 14th
- Campeonato Paraense: 2nd
- Copa Verde: Quarter-finals
- Copa do Brasil: First round
- Highest home attendance: 33,036 (vs. Sampaio Corrêa, 2 September 2017)
- Lowest home attendance: 3,171 (vs. Paragominas, 19 February 2017)
Home colors	Away colors

The 2017 season was Remo's 104th existence. The club participated in the Campeonato Brasileiro Série C, the Campeonato Paraense, the Copa Verde and the Copa do Brasil.

Remo finished outside of the top four of the Campeonato Brasileiro Série C (7th place in the group stage and 14th overall). The club finished in the 2nd place of the Campeonato Paraense. In the Copa Verde, Remo was eliminated in the quarter-finals by Santos-AP 4-2 in the aggregate. In the Copa do Brasil, the club was eliminated in the first round by Brusque.

== Players ==
=== Squad information ===
Numbers in parentheses denote appearances as substitute.

As of 10 September 2017

Position	Nat.	Name	Date of Birth (Age)		
Position	Nat.	Name	Date of Birth (Age)	Apps	Goals
GK	BRA	Vinícius	9 November 1984 (aged 32)	20	0
GK	BRA	André Luís	1 January 1989 (aged 28)	17	0
GK	BRA	Evandro Gigante	15 November 1985 (aged 31)	0	0
GK	BRA	André	14 January 1995 (aged 22)	0	0
DF	BRA	Bruno Costa	15 January 1987 (aged 30)	11	0
DF	BRA	Leandro Silva	7 April 1986 (aged 31)	13	1
DF	BRA	Igor João	23 April 1993 (aged 24)	21 (1)	3
DF	BRA	Martony	14 August 1987 (aged 30)	4	0
DF	BRA	Tsunami	4 January 1996 (aged 21)	26 (2)	3
DF	BRA	Luiz Cláudio	2 January 1996 (aged 21)	0 (1)	0
DF	BRA	Léo Rosa	13 December 1985 (aged 31)	28	1
DF	BRA	Gerson	3 April 1986 (aged 31)	8	0
DF	BRA	Jackinha	11 October 1991 (aged 25)	17 (1)	0
DF	BRA	David	16 May 1996 (aged 21)	1 (1)	0
MF	BRA	Jeferson	5 May 1996 (aged 21)	2 (2)	0
MF	BRA	Lucas Victor	7 November 1996 (aged 20)	3 (4)	0
MF	BRA	Ilaílson	9 April 1985 (aged 32)	9 (2)	0
MF	BRA	Dudu	26 October 1986 (aged 30)	8	0
MF	BRA	França	21 April 1991 (aged 26)	5 (1)	0
MF	BRA	João Paulo	10 March 1989 (aged 28)	14 (1)	0
MF	BRA	Danilinho	1 April 1985 (aged 32)	2 (3)	0
MF	BRA	Max Sandro	3 January 1996 (aged 21)	2	0
MF	BRA	Rodrigo	26 May 1994 (aged 23)	1 (4)	1
MF	BRA	Flamel	6 October 1983 (aged 33)	16 (8)	4
MF	BRA	Levi	21 August 1996 (aged 21)	0 (1)	0
MF	BRA	Eduardo Ramos	25 March 1986 (aged 31)	19 (1)	4
FW	BRA	Jayme	20 March 1993 (aged 24)	12 (12)	6
FW	BRA	Edgar	26 January 1986 (aged 31)	25 (8)	7
FW	BRA	Pimentinha	13 September 1987 (aged 29)	9 (1)	1
FW	BRA	Gabriel Lima	27 October 1996 (aged 20)	12 (11)	5
FW	BRA	Luiz Eduardo	24 May 1985 (aged 32)	9 (1)	2
Players left the club during the playing season
DF	BRA	Zé Antônio	13 August 1990 (aged 27)	7 (3)	1
DF	BRA	Henrique	8 February 1991 (aged 26)	20	2
DF	BRA	Daniel Damião	5 May 1988 (aged 29)	4	0
DF	BRA	Caio Ribeiro	2 October 1996 (aged 20)	1 (2)	0
MF	BRA	Marquinhos	6 January 1986 (aged 31)	14 (1)	2
MF	BRA	Renan Silva	5 January 1984 (aged 33)	6 (1)	0
MF	BRA	Elizeu	28 May 1989 (aged 28)	9 (5)	0
MF	BRA	Marcelo Labarthe	12 August 1984 (aged 33)	5 (2)	0
MF	BRA	Fininho	29 October 1986 (aged 30)	5 (9)	1
MF	BRA	Kaio Wilker	5 February 1993 (aged 24)	0 (1)	0
MF	BRA	Mikael	6 April 1993 (aged 24)	6	1
MF	BRA	Ronny	19 August 1991 (aged 26)	0 (2)	0
FW	BRA	Sílvio	11 February 1994 (aged 23)	0 (1)	0
FW	BRA	Felipe de Jesus	25 March 1997 (aged 20)	1 (3)	0
FW	BRA	João Victor	7 December 1994 (aged 22)	1 (4)	1
FW	ARG	Santiago Krieger	13 April 1995 (aged 22)	5	1
FW	BRA	Val Barreto	6 February 1986 (aged 31)	3 (8)	1
FW	BRA	Nino Guerreiro	11 October 1983 (aged 33)	6 (1)	2

=== Top scorers ===
As of 10 September 2017

Place	Position	Name	Campeonato Brasileiro Série C	Campeonato Paraense	Copa Verde	Copa do Brasil	Total
1	FW	Edgar	2	5	0	0	7
2	FW	Jayme	3	2	1	0	6
3	FW	Gabriel Lima	2	2	1	0	5
4	MF	Eduardo Ramos	2	2	0	0	4
4	MF	Flamel	2	1	1	0	4
6	DF	Tsunami	0	2	1	0	3
6	DF	Igor João	1	2	0	0	3
8	FW	Luiz Eduardo	2	0	0	0	2
8	FW	Nino Guerreiro	2	0	0	0	2
8	MF	Marquinhos	0	2	0	0	2
8	DF	Henrique	0	0	2	0	2
13	FW	Pimentinha	1	0	0	0	1
13	FW	Krieger	0	1	0	0	1
13	FW	Val Barreto	0	0	1	0	1
13	FW	João Victor	0	1	0	0	1
13	MF	Mikael	1	0	0	0	1
13	MF	Rodrigo	0	1	0	0	1
13	MF	Fininho	0	1	0	0	1
13	DF	Léo Rosa	0	1	0	0	1
13	DF	Leandro Silva	1	0	0	0	1
13	DF	Zé Antônio	0	0	0	1	1

=== Disciplinary record ===
As of 10 September 2017

Position	Name	Campeonato Brasileiro Série C		Campeonato Paraense		Copa Verde		Copa do Brasil		Total	
Position	Name	Yellow card	Red card	Yellow card	Red card	Yellow card	Red card	Yellow card	Red card	Yellow card	Red card
DF	Tsunami	3	1	5	0	1	0	0	0	9	1
DF	Igor João	0	0	4	0	3	1	1	0	8	1
DF	Léo Rosa	3	1	3	0	1	0	0	0	7	1
DF	Jackinha	2	1	4	0	0	0	0	0	6	1
MF	Danilinho	2	1	0	0	0	0	0	0	2	1
MF	Marquinhos	0	0	1	1	1	0	0	0	2	1
FW	Jayme	3	0	4	0	0	0	0	0	7	0
FW	Edgar	2	0	3	0	1	0	1	0	7	0
MF	João Paulo	6	0	0	0	0	0	0	0	6	0
MF	Ilaílson	6	0	0	0	0	0	0	0	6	0
MF	Elizeu	0	0	2	0	3	0	0	0	5	0
DF	Henrique	1	0	2	0	2	0	0	0	5	0
MF	Eduardo Ramos	3	0	2	0	0	0	0	0	5	0
DF	Leandro Silva	5	0	0	0	0	0	0	0	5	0
MF	Renan Silva	0	0	4	0	0	0	0	0	4	0
FW	Gabriel Lima	1	0	1	0	1	0	0	0	3	0
DF	Bruno Costa	3	0	0	0	0	0	0	0	3	0
MF	Dudu	3	0	0	0	0	0	0	0	3	0
FW	Luiz Eduardo	3	0	0	0	0	0	0	0	3	0
MF	Flamel	0	0	2	0	0	0	0	0	2	0
GK	Vinícius	1	0	1	0	0	0	0	0	2	0
MF	Marcelo Labarthe	2	0	0	0	0	0	0	0	2	0
GK	André Luís	1	0	1	0	0	0	0	0	2	0
DF	Gerson	2	0	0	0	0	0	0	0	2	0
MF	França	2	0	0	0	0	0	0	0	2	0
DF	Martony	2	0	0	0	0	0	0	0	2	0
MF	Rodrigo	1	0	0	0	0	0	0	0	1	0
MF	Mikael	1	0	0	0	0	0	0	0	1	0
FW	Nino Guerreiro	1	0	0	0	0	0	0	0	1	0
DF	Caio Ribeiro	0	0	1	0	0	0	0	0	1	0
DF	David	0	0	1	0	0	0	0	0	1	0
FW	João Victor	0	0	1	0	0	0	0	0	1	0
MF	Max Sandro	0	0	0	0	1	0	0	0	1	0
FW	Val Barreto	0	0	1	0	0	0	0	0	1	0
FW	Krieger	0	0	1	0	0	0	0	0	1	0
MF	Jeferson	0	0	1	0	0	0	0	0	1	0
MF	Fininho	0	0	0	0	1	0	0	0	1	0
	TOTALS	58	4	45	1	15	1	2	0	120	6

== Kit ==
Supplier: Topper / Main sponsor: Banpará

Home; 2016–17	Home alt. 1; 2016–17	Home alt. 2; 2016–17	Home	Home alt. 1	Away; 2016–17	Away alt. 1; 2016–17	Away alt. 2; 2016–17	Away	Away alt. 1

== Transfers ==
=== Transfers in ===
Position	Name	From	Source
DF	Léo Rosa	(Brazil) Castanhal	
DF	Jackinha	(Brazil) Castanhal	
MF	Fininho	(Brazil) Sport Belém	
MF	Rodrigo	(Brazil) Corinthians	
FW	Felipe de Jesus	(Brazil) Carajás	
FW	Jayme	(Brazil) Pinheirense	
FW	Val Barreto	Free agent	
DF	Zé Antônio	(Brazil) Atlético Potiguar (loan)	
GK	André Luís	(Brazil) Cuiabá	
FW	Santiago Krieger	(Argentina) Huracán (loan)	
MF	Marquinhos	(Brazil) Nova Iguaçu	
MF	Elizeu	(Brazil) CSA	
GK	Vinícius	(Brazil) Boavista	
DF	Caio Ribeiro	(Brazil) Paysandu	
FW	Edgar	(Brazil) Sampaio Corrêa (loan)	
MF	Renan Silva	(Brazil) Bangu	
MF	Eduardo Ramos	(Brazil) Santo André (loan return)	
MF	Mikael	(Brazil) Passo Fundo	
MF	Danilinho	(Brazil) Itumbiara	
MF	João Paulo	(Brazil) Uberlândia	
MF	Marcelo Labarthe	(Brazil) Itumbiara	
DF	Bruno Costa	(Brazil) Uberlândia	
FW	Nino Guerreiro	(Brazil) CRAC	
DF	Daniel Damião	(Brazil) Bangu	
MF	Kaio Wilker	(Brazil) Ypiranga	
DF	Gerson	(Brazil) Brasiliense	
MF	Ronny	(Brazil) Confiança	
GK	Evandro Gigante	(Brazil) Independente	
MF	Ilaílson	Free agent	
DF	Leandro Silva	(Brazil) Água Santa	
FW	Pimentinha	(Brazil) Sampaio Corrêa (loan)	
FW	Luiz Eduardo	(Brazil) Caldense	
MF	Dudu	(Brazil) Trem	
DF	Martony	(Brazil) Independente	
MF	França	(Brazil) Londrina (loan)	
MF	Levi	(Brazil) Fluminense (loan)	

=== Transfers out ===
Position	Name	To	Source
DF	Levy	(Brazil) ABC (loan)	
DF	Max	(Brazil) Joinville	
MF	Eduardo Ramos	(Brazil) Santo André (loan)	
MF	Edicleber	(Brazil) Penarol (loan)	
FW	Sílvio	(Brazil) Barretos (loan)	
DF	Zé Antônio	Free agent	
DF	Caio Ribeiro	Free agent	
MF	Marquinhos	Free agent	
MF	Renan Silva	Free agent	
MF	Elizeu	Free agent	
FW	Val Barreto	Free agent	
FW	João Victor	Free agent	
FW	Felipe de Jesus	Free agent	
FW	Santiago Krieger	Free agent	
DF	Henrique	(Costa Rica) Saprissa	
DF	Daniel Damião	Free agent	
MF	Marcelo Labarthe	Free agent	
MF	Fininho	Free agent	
MF	Ronny	Free agent	
MF	Kaio Wilker	Free agent	
MF	Mikael	Free agent	
FW	Nino Guerreiro	Free agent	

== Competitions ==
Competition	First match	Last match	Starting round	Final position	Record							
Competition	First match	Last match	Starting round	Final position	Pld	W	D	L	GF	GA	GD	Win %
Campeonato Brasileiro Série C	14 May 2017	9 September 2017	Group stage	14th	18	5	7	6	19	21	−2	27.78
Campeonato Paraense	29 January 2017	7 May 2017	Group stage	2nd	14	7	5	2	23	13	+10	50.00
Copa Verde	5 March 2017	3 April 2017	Round of 16	Quarter-finals	4	2	1	1	7	5	+2	50.00
Copa do Brasil	16 February 2017		First round	First round	1	0	0	1	1	2	−1	0.00
Total					37	14	13	10	50	41	+9	37.84

Source: Competitions

=== Campeonato Brasileiro Série C ===
==== Group stage ====
Pos	Team	Pld	W	D	L	GF	GA	GD	Pts	Qualification or relegation
5	Salgueiro	18	7	3	8	19	16	+3	24	
6	Cuiabá	18	4	11	3	17	17	0	23	
7	Remo	18	5	7	6	19	21	−2	22	
8	Botafogo-PB	18	6	3	9	18	21	−3	21	
9	Moto Club (R)	18	5	5	8	18	20	−2	20	Relegation to 2018 Campeonato Brasileiro Série D

Source: Soccerway.com
Rules for classification: 1) points; 2) wins; 3) goal difference; 4) goals scored; 5) head-to-head results; 6) least red cards received; 7) least yellow cards received; 8) draw.
(R) Relegated

===== Matches =====
14 May 2017 1	Remo	1–0	Fortaleza	Belém
19:00 UTC−3	João Paulo (yellow card) 31'; Nino Guerreiro 74' (pen.); Vinícius (yellow card) 90'	Report		Stadium: Mangueirão; Attendance: 7,976; Referee: Antônio Neuriclaudio do Rego Costa

20 May 2017 2	ASA	1–0	Remo	Arapiraca
16:30 UTC−3	Doda (yellow card) 38'; Leandro Kivel 58'; Jhulliam (yellow card) 68'; Fernando Júnior (yellow card) 79'	Report	João Paulo (yellow card) 24'; Marcelo Labarthe (yellow card) 61'; Edgar (yellow card) 79'	Stadium: Estádio Municipal Coaracy da Mata Fonseca; Attendance: 890; Referee: Sávio Sampaio

28 May 2017 3	Remo	1–1	Cuiabá	Belém
19:00 UTC−3	Mikael 20'; Henrique (yellow card) 73'; Tsunami (yellow card) 81'; Bruno Costa (yellow card) 88'	Report	Pereira (yellow card) 60'; Elias 67'; Léo Salino (yellow card) 69'	Stadium: Mangueirão; Attendance: 6,061; Referee: Carlos Ronne Casas de Paiva

5 June 2017 4	Confiança	0–1	Remo	Aracaju
21:00 UTC−3	Álvaro (yellow card) 49'	Report	Mikael (yellow card) 9'; João Paulo (yellow card) 29'; Edgar 51'; Nino Guerreiro (yellow card) 88'	Stadium: Batistão; Attendance: 4,148; Referee: Antônio Neuriclaudio do Rego Costa

10 June 2017 5	Remo	1–1	CSA	Belém
19:30 UTC−3	Jayme 61'; Marcelo Labarthe (yellow card) 63'; Tsunami (yellow card) 71'	Report	Dick (yellow card) 75'; Dawhan 90+1'	Stadium: Mangueirão; Attendance: 7,747; Referee: Rodrigo Carvalhaes de Miranda

19 June 2017 6	Botafogo-PB	3–2	Remo	João Pessoa
21:00 UTC−3	Igor João 3' (o.g.); Gustavo (yellow card) 33'; Roger Gaúcho 47'; Magno 52'	Report	Tsunami (red card) 21'; Nino Guerreiro 45' (pen.); Igor João 71'	Stadium: Almeidão; Attendance: 7,272; Referee: Paulo Henrique de Melo Salmazio

24 June 2017 7	Remo	3–2	Moto Club	Belém
18:00 UTC−3	Edgar 7'; Ilaílson (yellow card) 22'; Gerson (yellow card) 30'; Leandro Silva (yellow card) 45'; Flamel 45+2'; Gabriel Lima 90+1', (yellow card) 90+2'	Report	Raí (yellow card) 9'; Bruno Costa 27' (o.g.); Vitinho 41'; Michel (yellow card) 63'	Stadium: Mangueirão; Attendance: 6,528; Referee: Pathrice Wallace Corrêa Maia

3 July 2017 8	Sampaio Corrêa	1–1	Remo	São Luís
21:00 UTC−3	Marlon (yellow card) 17', (goal) 55' (pen.); Diego Silva (yellow card) 58'	Report	Léo Rosa (yellow card) 48' (yellow-red card) 66'; Leandro Silva (yellow card) 72'; Gabriel Lima 84'	Stadium: Castelão; Attendance: 3,801; Referee: Renato Cardoso da Conceição

9 July 2017 9	Remo	0–1	Salgueiro	Belém
18:00 UTC−3	Ilaílson (yellow card) 39'	Report	Cássio Ortega 41'	Stadium: Mangueirão; Attendance: 9,839; Referee: Marco Aurélio Augusto Fazekas Ferreira

16 July 2017 10	Fortaleza	1–1	Remo	Fortaleza
18:00 UTC−3	Paulo Sérgio (yellow card) 28', (goal) 32'	Report	Luiz Eduardo 10', (yellow card) 26'; Leandro Silva (yellow card) 60'; Jackinha (yellow card) 86'	Stadium: Estádio Presidente Vargas; Attendance: 8,866; Referee: Antônio Santos Nunes

24 July 2017 11	Remo	1–0	ASA	Belém
21:00 UTC−3	Bruno Costa (yellow card) 51'; Flamel 52'; André Luís (yellow card) 53'; Tsunami (yellow card) 67'; Ilaílson (yellow card) 69'; Léo Rosa (yellow card) 72'	Report	Leandro Kivel (yellow card) 67'	Stadium: Mangueirão; Attendance: 7,301; Referee: Rodrigo Gomes Paes Domingues

31 July 2017 12	Cuiabá	0–0	Remo	Cuiabá
21:00 UTC−3	Bileu (yellow card) 84'; Héverton (yellow card) 86'; Willian Simões (yellow card) 86'	Report	Leandro Silva (yellow card) 9'; João Paulo (yellow card) 33'	Stadium: Arena Pantanal; Attendance: 760; Referee: Rodrigo Guarizo Ferreira do Amaral

6 August 2017 13	Remo	2–2	Confiança	Belém
18:00 UTC−3	Luiz Eduardo 25', (yellow card) 30'; Pimentinha 46'; França (yellow card) 56'; Ilaílson (yellow card) 77'; Edgar (yellow card) 81'	Report	Flávio (yellow card) 13'; Gilsinho (yellow card) 69'; Tito 81', (yellow card) 89'; Rafael Vila 83'; Frontini (yellow card) 89'; Genivaldo (yellow card) 89'; Álvaro (yellow card) 90+4'; Jardel (yellow card) 90+4'	Stadium: Mangueirão; Attendance: 15,835; Referee: Felipe Gomes da Silva

12 August 2017 14	CSA	2–0	Remo	Maceió
16:00 UTC−3	Rafinha 35'; Thales (yellow card) 40'; Dawhan (yellow card) 57'; Didira 84'; Michel (yellow card) 90+1'	Report	Ilaílson (yellow card) 4'; Gerson (yellow card) 18'; Eduardo Ramos (yellow card) 36'; João Paulo (yellow card) 55'; Bruno Costa (yellow card) 82'; Jayme (yellow card) 90+2'	Stadium: Estádio Rei Pelé; Attendance: 7,078; Referee: Diego Pombo Lopez

20 August 2017 15	Remo	2–1	Botafogo-PB	Belém
18:00 UTC−3	Ilaílson (yellow card) 11'; Eduardo Ramos 25', 86' (yellow card) 62'; João Paulo (yellow card) 45'; Dudu (yellow card) 45+3'; Martony (yellow card) 77'; Jackinha (red card) 90'; França (yellow card) 90+4'	Report	Magno (yellow card) 45' (yellow-red card) 83'; Dico 51'; Fernandinho (yellow card) 72', (red card) 90'	Stadium: Mangueirão; Attendance: 18,124; Referee: Wanderson Alves de Sousa

26 August 2017 16	Moto Club	1–1	Remo	São Luís
17:15 UTC−3	Vinícius Paquetá 45'	Report	Dudu (yellow card) 38'; Jayme 80', (yellow card) 83'	Stadium: Castelão; Attendance: 2,562; Referee: Antônio Dib Moraes de Sousa

2 September 2017 17	Remo	1–2	Sampaio Corrêa	Belém
16:15 UTC−3	Jackinha (yellow card) 12'; Dudu (yellow card) 24'; Jayme 30'; Martony (yellow card) 53'; Eduardo Ramos (yellow card) 53'; Luiz Eduardo (yellow card) 84'; Danilinho (yellow card) 84' (yellow-red card) 90+3'	Report	Valderrama (yellow card) 4'; Fernando Sobral 14' (pen.); João Vitor (yellow card) 22'; Hiltinho (yellow card) 53'; Uilliam 69'; Pedro Costa (yellow card) 83'	Stadium: Mangueirão; Attendance: 33,036; Referee: Alexandre Vargas Tavares de Jesus

9 September 2017 18	Salgueiro	2–1	Remo	Salgueiro
19:30 UTC−3	Rodolfo Potiguar (yellow card) 20'; Álvaro 25'; Luís Eduardo (yellow card) 27'; Jean Carlos 38'; Mondragón (yellow card) 63'	Report	Leandro Silva (yellow card) 23', (goal) 90+4'; Rodrigo (yellow card) 60'; Jayme (yellow card) 89'	Stadium: Estádio Cornélio de Barros; Attendance: 1,251; Referee: André Luiz de Freitas Castro

=== Campeonato Paraense ===
==== Group stage ====
Pos	Team	Pld	W	D	L	GF	GA	GD	Pts	Qualification or relegation
1	Remo (A)	10	6	4	0	18	7	+11	22	Qualifies to the Semifinals
2	Independente (A)	10	5	3	2	16	11	+5	18	Qualifies to the Semifinals
3	Águia de Marabá	10	4	3	3	14	10	+4	15	
4	Castanhal	10	4	3	3	12	11	+1	15	
5	São Francisco (R)	10	2	1	7	6	17	−11	7	2018 Paraense 2nd Division

(A) Advance to a further round; (R) Relegated

===== Matches =====
29 January 2017 1	Remo	5–0	Cametá	Belém
16:00 UTC−3	Fininho 19' (pen.); Edgar 22', 52'; Jayme 28'; Renan Silva (yellow card) 43'; Flamel 82'	Report	Negueba (yellow card) 18'; Frank (yellow card) 54'; Rafael Paty (yellow card) 72'; Thiago Costa (yellow card) 76'	Stadium: Mangueirão; Attendance: 11,217; Referee: Dewson Fernando Freitas da Silva

1 February 2017 2	Pinheirense	0–0	Remo	Belém
20:30 UTC−3	Alexandre (yellow card) 16' (yellow-red card) 80'; Magrão (yellow card) 72'; Hallyson (yellow card) 75'; Paulo Wanzeler (yellow card) 90+3'	Report	Flamel (yellow card) 43'; Renan Silva (yellow card) 56'; Léo Rosa (yellow card) 70'; Val Barreto (yellow card) 75'	Stadium: Mangueirão; Attendance: 4,793; Referee: Wasley do Couto Leão

5 February 2017 3	São Raimundo	1–1	Remo	Santarém
18:00 UTC−3	Wanderlan (yellow card) 49'; Tiago 78' (pen.); Bilau (yellow card) 84'	Report	Igor João (yellow card) 9'; André Luís (yellow card) 77'; Tsunami 87'; Jackinha (yellow card) 89'	Stadium: Estádio Colosso do Tapajós; Attendance: 5,475; Referee: Joelson Nazareno Ferreira Cardoso

12 February 2017 4	Remo	2–1	Paysandu	Belém
16:00 UTC−3	Edgar 17', 90+3' (yellow card) 90+4'; Jackinha (yellow card) 59'; Renan Silva (yellow card) 65'; Caio Ribeiro (yellow card) 72'; Tsunami (yellow card) 82'	Report	Rodrigo Andrade 37', (yellow card) 56' (yellow-red card) 71'; Gilvan (yellow card) 81'	Stadium: Mangueirão; Attendance: 27,953; Referee: Gustavo Ramos Melo

19 February 2017 5	Remo	3–2	Paragominas	Belém
16:00 UTC−3	Léo Rosa 38'; Krieger (yellow card) 40'; Edgar 45+1'; Gabriel Lima 61'; Igor João (yellow card) 78'; Jackinha (yellow card) 86'	Report	Wellinton Pimenta 9'; Ratinho 36'; Fabrício (yellow card) 43'; Devan (yellow card) 88'	Stadium: Mangueirão; Attendance: 3,171; Referee: Djonaltan Costa Araújo

24 February 2017 6	Cametá	0–1	Remo	Cametá
16:00 UTC−3	Maicon Talhetti (yellow card) 62'; Tonhão (yellow card) 82'	Report	Gabriel Lima (yellow card) 25'; Igor João (yellow card) 40'; Krieger 50'; Tsunami (yellow card) 90'	Stadium: Parque do Bacurau; Attendance: 2,280; Referee: Joquetan Moreira Guimarães

11 March 2017 7	Remo	2–0	Pinheirense	Belém
16:00 UTC−3	Edgar (yellow card) 11'; Tsunami (yellow card) 15'; Marquinhos 29' (pen.); Eduardo Ramos 75'; Elizeu (yellow card) 80'	Report	Sandro (yellow card) 12'; Wallace (yellow card) 14'; Feijão (yellow card) 50'	Stadium: Mangueirão; Attendance: 3,632; Referee: Gustavo Ramos Melo

19 March 2017 8	Remo	2–1	São Raimundo	Belém
16:00 UTC−3	Marquinhos 27' (pen.), (red card) 78'; David (yellow card) 28'; Léo Rosa (yellow card) 33'; Henrique (yellow card) 34'; Jayme 59'; Eduardo Ramos (yellow card) 61'	Report	Tubarão (yellow card) 13'; Rubran (yellow card) 25'; Alexandre (yellow card) 25'; Tiago 71'	Stadium: Mangueirão; Attendance: 5,575; Referee: Wasley do Couto Leão

26 March 2017 9	Paysandu	1–1	Remo	Belém
16:30 UTC−3	Bérgson 11'; Ricardo Capanema (yellow card) 18' (yellow-red card) 23'; Diogo Oliveira (yellow card) 25'; Rodrigo Andrade (yellow card) 28'	Report	Tsunami (yellow card) 32'; Léo Rosa (yellow card) 34'; Igor João (yellow card) 41'; Jayme (yellow card) 58'; Flamel (yellow card) 61'; Eduardo Ramos (yellow card) 84', (goal) 89'	Stadium: Mangueirão; Attendance: 22,421; Referee: Dewson Fernando Freitas da Silva

8 April 2017 10	Paragominas	1–1	Remo	Paragominas
16:00 UTC−3	Yan (yellow card) 20' (yellow-red card) 58'; Wellinton Pimenta 24', (yellow card) 74'; Cristovam (yellow card) 58'	Report	Vinícius (yellow card) 25'; Gabriel Lima 28'; Jeferson (yellow card) 90'	Stadium: Estádio Arena do Município Verde; Attendance: 571; Referee: Djonaltan Costa Araújo

==== Final stage ====
===== Semi-finals =====
12 April 2017 First leg	Independente	2–0	Remo	Tucuruí
20:30 UTC−3	Martony (yellow card) 18'; Chicão 23', (yellow card) 70'; Wellington Cabeça (yellow card) 47'; Monga 49', (yellow card) 58'; Dudu (yellow card) 73'; Wegno (yellow card) 77'	Report	Jackinha (yellow card) 45'; Jayme (yellow card) 76'; Marquinhos (yellow card) 79'	Stadium: Navegantão; Attendance: 1,830; Referee: Joelson Nazareno Ferreira Cardoso

23 April 2017 Second leg	Remo	3–1 (3–3 agg.) (10–9 p)	Independente	Belém
16:00 UTC−3	Jayme (yellow card) 21'; Henrique (yellow card) 34'; Elizeu (yellow card) 45'; Igor João 48'; Tsunami 85'; João Victor 87', (yellow card) 88'	Report	Ezequias (yellow card) 1'; Dudu (yellow card) 4'; Magno (yellow card) 5', (goal) 13'; Rodrigo (yellow card) 40'; Mocajuba (yellow card) 60'; Monga (yellow card) 90'	Stadium: Mangueirão; Attendance: 8,329; Referee: Dewson Fernando Freitas da Silva
	Penalties
	João Victor (penalty missed); Val Barreto (penalty scored); Gabriel Lima (penalty scored); Tsunami (penalty scored); Edgar (penalty scored); Lucas Victor (penalty scored); Elizeu (penalty scored); Henrique (penalty missed); Jayme (penalty scored); Igor João (penalty scored); André Luís (penalty scored); Val Barreto (penalty scored)		(penalty scored) Anderson Preto; (penalty scored) Dudu; (penalty scored) Martony; (penalty scored) Wellington Cabeça; (penalty missed) Wesley Bigu; (penalty scored) Diego Lira; (penalty scored) Mocajuba; (penalty missed) Ezequias; (penalty scored) Chicão; (penalty scored) Monga; (penalty scored) Evandro; (penalty missed) Anderson Preto

===== Finals =====
30 April 2017 First leg	Paysandu	1–1	Remo	Belém
16:00 UTC−3	Bérgson 27'; Ayrton (yellow card) 48'; Perema (yellow card) 69'	Report	Tsunami (yellow card) 26'; Igor João 50'; Renan Silva (yellow card) 71'	Stadium: Mangueirão; Attendance: 16,550; Referee: Ricardo Marques

7 May 2017 Second leg	Remo	1–2 (2–3 agg.)	Paysandu	Belém
16:00 UTC−3	Edgar (yellow card) 45'; Rodrigo 61'; Jayme (yellow card) 90+2'	Report	Bérgson (yellow card) 15' (goal) 30', 90'; Perema (yellow card) 58'	Stadium: Mangueirão; Attendance: 31,465; Referee: Wagner Reway

=== Copa Verde ===
==== Round of 16 ====
5 March 2017 First leg	Atlético Acreano	1–1	Remo	Rio Branco
18:00 UTC−3	Careca 52'; Pé de Ferro (yellow card) 67' (yellow-red card) 78'; Geovani (yellow card) 90+2'	Report	Elizeu (yellow card) 39'; Max Sandro (yellow card) 42'; Igor João (yellow card) 45+1'; Flamel 76'	Stadium: Arena da Floresta; Attendance: 3,147; Referee: Fledes Rodrigues Santos

16 March 2017 Second leg	Remo	4–0 (5–1 agg.)	Atlético Acreano	Belém
20:30 UTC−3	Edgar (yellow card) 39'; Henrique 49', (yellow card) 55'; Elizeu (yellow card) 55'; Tsunami 60'; Gabriel Lima 79'; Jayme 89'	Report	Antônio Marcos (yellow card) 58'; Leandro Jucá (yellow card) 67'; Polaco (yellow card) 69'; Joel (yellow card) 78'	Stadium: Mangueirão; Attendance: 8,622; Referee: Vanderlei Soares de Macedo

==== Quarter-finals ====
30 March 2017 First leg	Remo	2–1	Santos-AP	Belém
19:00 UTC−3	Val Barreto 43'; Elizeu (yellow card) 45+1'; Léo Rosa (yellow card) 61'; Fininho (yellow card) 70'; Henrique 82'	Report	Luciano 32'; Balão Marabá (yellow card) 56'	Stadium: Mangueirão; Attendance: 8,406; Referee: Antônio Carlos Pequeno Frutuoso

3 April 2017 Second leg	Santos-AP	3–0 (4–2 agg.)	Remo	Macapá
20:15 UTC−3	Fabinho 14'; Lessandro (yellow card) 24'; Batata (yellow card) 50', (goal) 85'; Rafinha (yellow card) 54'; Luciano (yellow card) 55'; Diego Fonseca (yellow card) 64'; Denílson 75'	Report	Henrique (yellow card) 15'; Tsunami (yellow card) 21'; Marquinhos (yellow card) 45+2'; Igor João (yellow card) 48' (yellow-red card) 72'; Gabriel Lima (yellow card) 87'	Stadium: Zerão; Attendance: 2,133; Referee: Edmar Campos da Encarnação

=== Copa do Brasil ===
==== First round ====
16 February 2017	Brusque	2–1	Remo	Brusque
18:15 UTC−3	Jonatas Belusso 24'; Willian (yellow card) 36'; Ricardo Lobo 57'; Eliomar (yellow card) 81'	Report	Zé Antônio 33'; Edgar (yellow card) 35'; Igor João (yellow card) 40'	Stadium: Estádio Augusto Bauer; Attendance: 2,875; Referee: Daniel Nobre Bins
