= 2017 Campeonato Paraense finals =

- Event: 2017 Campeonato Paraense
Paysandu	Remo
3	2
- on aggregate

First leg
Paysandu	Remo
1	1
- Date: 30 April 2017
- Venue: Mangueirão, Belém
- Referee: Ricardo Marques
- Attendance: 16,550

Second leg
Remo	Paysandu
1	2
- Date: 7 May 2017
- Venue: Mangueirão, Belém
- Referee: Wagner Reway
- Attendance: 31,465

The 2017 Campeonato Paraense finals was the final that decided the 2017 Campeonato Paraense, the 105th season of the Campeonato Paraense. The final were contested between Paysandu and Remo.

Paysandu defeated Remo 3–2 on aggregate to win their 47th Campeonato Paraense title.

== Road to the final ==
Note: In all scores below, the score of the home team is given first.

Paysandu			Round	Remo		
Opponent	Venue	Score		Opponent	Venue	Score
Group A1			Group stage	Group A2		
Pos / Team / Pld / Pts; 1 / Paysandu (A) / 10 / 20; 2 / São Raimundo (A) / 10 / 17; 3 / Cametá / 10 / 9; 4 / Paragominas / 10 / 8; 5 / Pinheirense (R) / 10 / 5; Source: (A) Advance to a further round; (R) Relegated			Group stage	Pos / Team / Pld / Pts; 1 / Remo (A) / 10 / 22; 2 / Independente (A) / 10 / 18; 3 / Águia de Marabá / 10 / 15; 4 / Castanhal / 10 / 15; 5 / São Francisco (R) / 10 / 7; Source: (A) Advance to a further round; (R) Relegated		
São Raimundo (won 3–1 on aggregate)	Away	0–0	Semi-finals	Independente (tied 3–3 on aggregate, won 10–9 on penalties)	Away	2–0
São Raimundo (won 3–1 on aggregate)	Home	3–1	Semi-finals	Independente (tied 3–3 on aggregate, won 10–9 on penalties)	Home	3–1

== Format ==
The finals were played on a home-and-away two-legged basis. If tied on aggregate, the penalty shoot-out was used to determine the winner.

== Matches ==
=== First leg ===
30 April 2017
16:00 UTC−3

Paysandu	1–1	Remo
Bérgson 27'	Report	Igor João 50'

Mangueirão, Belém
Attendance: 16,550
Referee: Ricardo Marques

Paysandu	Remo

GK	1	(Brazil) Emerson
DF	2	(Brazil) Ayrton	(yellow card) 48'
DF	26	(Brazil) Perema	(yellow card) 69'
DF	4	(Brazil) Gilvan
DF	40	(Brazil) Hayner
MF	15	(Brazil) Wesley
MF	8	(Brazil) Augusto Recife (c)
MF	10	(Brazil) Diogo Oliveira	(substituted off) 78'
FW	36	(Brazil) Leandro Carvalho	(substituted off) 85'
FW	28	(Brazil) Alfredo	(substituted off) 69'
FW	30	(Brazil) Bérgson
Substitutes:
MF	32	(Brazil) Rodrigo Andrade	(substituted in) 78'
FW	21	(Brazil) Will	(substituted in) 69'
FW	9	(Brazil) Leandro Cearense	(substituted in) 85'
Coach:
(Brazil) Marcelo Chamusca

GK	1	(Brazil) André Luís
DF	2	(Brazil) Léo Rosa
DF	3	(Brazil) Henrique (c)
DF	4	(Brazil) Igor João
DF	6	(Brazil) Tsunami		(yellow card) 26'
MF	5	(Brazil) Zé Antônio
MF	8	(Brazil) Jeferson		(substituted off) 66'
MF	10	(Brazil) Lucas Victor		(substituted off) 46'
FW	7	(Brazil) Gabriel Lima
FW	11	(Brazil) Edgar
FW	9	(Brazil) Jayme
Substitutes:
MF	13	(Brazil) Renan Silva	(yellow card) 71'	(substituted in) 66'	(substituted off) 81'
MF	20	(Brazil) Fininho		(substituted in) 81'
FW	21	(Brazil) João Victor		(substituted in) 46'
Coach:
(Brazil) Josué Teixeira

Assistant referees:
Bruno Boschillia (Paraná)
Alessandro Rocha Matos (Bahia)
Fourth official:
Gustavo Ramos Melo (Pará)
Fifth official:
Dimmi Yuri das Chagas Cardoso (Pará)

=== Second leg ===
7 May 2017
16:00 UTC−3

Remo	1–2	Paysandu
Rodrigo 61'	Report	Bérgson 30', 90'

Mangueirão, Belém
Attendance: 31,465
Referee: Wagner Reway

Remo	Paysandu

GK	1	(Brazil) André Luís
DF	2	(Brazil) Léo Rosa	(substituted off) 54'
DF	3	(Brazil) Henrique (c)
DF	4	(Brazil) Igor João
DF	6	(Brazil) Tsunami
MF	5	(Brazil) Zé Antônio
MF	8	(Brazil) Marquinhos	(substituted off) 54'
MF	7	(Brazil) Gabriel Lima
MF	10	(Brazil) Jayme	(yellow card) 90+2'
FW	11	(Brazil) Edgar	(yellow card) 45'
FW	9	(Brazil) João Victor	(substituted off) 67'
Substitutes:
MF	16	(Brazil) Rodrigo	(substituted in) 54'
MF	20	(Brazil) Fininho	(substituted in) 54'
FW	19	(Brazil) Val Barreto	(substituted in) 67'
Coach:
(Brazil) Josué Teixeira

GK	1	(Brazil) Emerson (c)
DF	2	(Brazil) Ayrton
DF	26	(Brazil) Perema	(yellow card) 58'
DF	4	(Brazil) Gilvan
DF	40	(Brazil) Hayner
MF	15	(Brazil) Wesley
MF	32	(Brazil) Rodrigo Andrade
MF	10	(Brazil) Diogo Oliveira	(substituted off) 76'
FW	36	(Brazil) Leandro Carvalho	(substituted off) 81'
FW	28	(Brazil) Alfredo	(substituted off) 58'
FW	30	(Brazil) Bérgson	(yellow card) 15'
Substitutes:
MF	8	(Brazil) Augusto Recife	(substituted in) 81'
MF	20	(Brazil) Daniel Sobralense	(substituted in) 76'
FW	9	(Brazil) Leandro Cearense	(substituted in) 58'
Coach:
(Brazil) Marcelo Chamusca

Assistant referees:
Danilo Ricardo Simon Manis (São Paulo)
Neuza Inês Back (Santa Catarina)
Fourth official:
Joelson Nazareno Ferreira Cardoso (Pará)
Fifth official:
Rafael Ferreira Vieira (Pará)

== See also ==
- 2018 Copa Verde
- 2018 Copa do Brasil
