= 2017 Campeonato Paraense =

Campeonato Paraense de Futebol
- Season: 2017
- Champions: Paysandu
- Relegated: São Francisco; Pinheirense
- Série D: Independente; São Raimundo
- Copa Verde: Paysandu
- Copa do Brasil: Paysandu; Remo; Independente
- Matches played: 58
- Goals scored: 140 (2.41 per match)
- Top goalscorer: Bérgson (Paysandu) (11 goals)
- Biggest home win: Águia de Marabá 6–1 Cametá (12 March 2017)
- Biggest away win: Paragominas 0–3 Castanhal (11 February 2017)
- Highest scoring: Águia de Marabá 6–1 Cametá (12 March 2017)
- Highest attendance: 31,465; Remo 1–2 Paysandu (7 May 2017)
- Lowest attendance: 20; Pinheirense 0–2 Castanhal (8 April 2017)

The 2017 Campeonato Paraense de Futebol was the 105th edition of Pará's top professional football league. The competition started on 29 January and ended on 7 May. Paysandu won the championship for the 47th time.

== Format ==
The competition will consist of two groups of five teams each, who will face off in round games and back against the other key times in a single turn. The top two will contest the semi-finals in their respective groups, thereby defining the two championship finalists. The losers of the semifinals will make two matches to decide the third place. Semifinal and final matches will round trip.

The worst placed of each group will be relegated to the Second Division.

The champion qualify to the 2018 Copa Verde. The champion, the runner-up and the 3rd-placed team qualify to the 2018 Copa do Brasil. The best two teams who isn't on Campeonato Brasileiro Série A, Série B or Série C qualifies to 2018 Campeonato Brasileiro Série D.

== Participating teams ==
Club	Home city	2016 result
Águia de Marabá	Marabá	8th
Cametá	Cametá	7th
Castanhal	Castanhal	2nd (on 2nd Division)
Independente	Tucuruí	6th
Paragominas	Paragominas	5th
Paysandu	Belém	1st
Pinheirense	Belém	1st (on 2nd Division)
Remo	Belém	4th
São Francisco	Santarém	2nd
São Raimundo	Santarém	3rd

== Group stage ==
=== Group A1 ===
Pos	Team	Pld	W	D	L	GF	GA	GD	Pts	Qualification or relegation
1	Paysandu (A)	10	6	2	2	17	5	+12	20	Qualifies to the Semifinals
2	São Raimundo (A)	10	4	5	1	15	9	+6	17	Qualifies to the Semifinals
3	Cametá	10	2	3	5	6	16	−10	9	
4	Paragominas	10	2	2	6	12	18	−6	8	
5	Pinheirense (R)	10	1	2	7	6	18	−12	5	2018 Paraense 2nd Division

(A) Advance to a further round; (R) Relegated

=== Group A2 ===
Pos	Team	Pld	W	D	L	GF	GA	GD	Pts	Qualification or relegation
1	Remo (A)	10	6	4	0	18	7	+11	22	Qualifies to the Semifinals
2	Independente (A)	10	5	3	2	16	11	+5	18	Qualifies to the Semifinals
3	Águia de Marabá	10	4	3	3	14	10	+4	15	
4	Castanhal	10	4	3	3	12	11	+1	15	
5	São Francisco (R)	10	2	1	7	6	17	−11	7	2018 Paraense 2nd Division

(A) Advance to a further round; (R) Relegated

== Semi-finals ==
=== First leg ===
11 April 2017
20:30 UTC –3

São Raimundo	0–0	Paysandu
	Report

Estádio Municipal Colosso do Tapajós, Santarém
Attendance: 4,371
Referee: Gustavo Ramos Melo

12 April 2017
20:30 UTC –3

Independente	2–0	Remo
Chicão 23'; Monga 49'	Report

Navegantão, Tucuruí
Attendance: 1,830
Referee: Joelson Nazareno Ferreira Cardoso

=== Second leg ===
22 April 2017
18:30 UTC –3

Paysandu	3–1	São Raimundo
Bérgson 13', 66' (pen.), 72'	Report	Alexandre 51'

Mangueirão, Belém
Attendance: 4,546
Referee: Djonaltan Costa Araújo

23 April 2017
16:00 UTC –3

Remo	3–1	Independente
Igor João 48'; Tsunami 85'; João Victor 87'	Report	Magno 13'
Penalties
João Victor (penalty missed); Val Barreto (penalty scored); Gabriel Lima (penalty scored); Tsunami (penalty scored); Edgar (penalty scored); Lucas Victor (penalty scored); Elizeu (penalty scored); Henrique (penalty missed); Jayme (penalty scored); Igor João (penalty scored); André Luís (penalty scored); Val Barreto (penalty scored)	10–9	(penalty scored) Anderson Preto; (penalty scored) Dudu; (penalty scored) Martony; (penalty scored) Wellington Cabeça; (penalty missed) Wesley Bigu; (penalty scored) Diego Lira; (penalty scored) Mocajuba; (penalty missed) Ezequias; (penalty scored) Chicão; (penalty scored) Monga; (penalty scored) Evandro; (penalty missed) Anderson Preto

Mangueirão, Belém
Attendance: 8,329
Referee: Dewson Fernando Freitas da Silva

== Third place play-off ==
1 May 2017
17:00 UTC –3

São Raimundo	1–1	Independente
Erick Foca 34'	Report	Monga 27'

Estádio Municipal Colosso do Tapajós, Santarém
Attendance: 850
Referee: Joelson Nazareno Ferreira Cardoso

5 May 2017
20:00 UTC –3

Independente	1–0	São Raimundo
Wegno 69'	Report

Navegantão, Tucuruí
Attendance: 439
Referee: Andrey da Silva e Silva

== Finals ==
30 April 2017
16:00 UTC –3

Paysandu	1–1	Remo
Bérgson 27'	Report	Igor João 50'

Mangueirão, Belém
Attendance: 16,550
Referee: Ricardo Marques

7 May 2017
16:00 UTC –3

Remo	1–2	Paysandu
Rodrigo 61'	Report	Bérgson 30', 90'

Mangueirão, Belém
Attendance: 31,465
Referee: Wagner Reway
