= 2014 Clube do Remo season =

2014 season of Brazilian association football team

Remo
2014 season
- President: Zeca Pirão
- Coach: Charles Guerreiro (until 13 March 2014); Roberto Fernandes
- Stadium: Baenão; Mangueirão
- Campeonato Brasileiro Série D: 14th
- Campeonato Paraense: 1st
- Copa Verde: Semi-finals
- Copa do Brasil: First round
- Highest home attendance: 18,864 (vs. Brasiliense, 28 September 2014)
- Lowest home attendance: 1,753 (vs. Interporto, 7 September 2014)
Home colors	Away colors

The 2014 season was Remo's 101st existence. The club participated in the Campeonato Brasileiro Série D, the Campeonato Paraense, the Copa Verde and the Copa do Brasil.

Remo finished outside of the top four of the Campeonato Brasileiro Série D, after being eliminated in the round of 16 by Brasiliense 3-2 on aggregate. The club won the Campeonato Paraense after six years, totalizing 43 titles of the championship. In the Copa Verde, Remo was eliminated in the semi-finals by Paysandu 1-0 on aggregate. In the Copa do Brasil, the club was eliminated in the first round by Internacional.

== Players ==
Players marked † left the club during the playing season.

As of 4 October 2014

Note: Flags indicate national team as defined under FIFA eligibility rules; some limited exceptions apply. Players may hold more than one non-FIFA nationality.

No.	Pos.	Nation	Player
—	GK	BRA	Fabiano
—	GK	BRA	Maycki Douglas
—	GK	BRA	Jader †
—	DF	BRA	Raphael Andrade
—	DF	BRA	Max
—	DF	BRA	Rubran
—	DF	BRA	Carlinho Rech †
—	DF	BRA	Igor João †
—	DF	BRA	Negretti
—	DF	BRA	Rogélio †
—	DF	BRA	Henrique †
—	DF	BRA	Levy
—	DF	BRA	Diogo Silva †
—	DF	BRA	Alex Ruan
—	DF	BRA	Jadílson
—	DF	BRA	Rodrigo Fernandes †
—	MF	BRA	Bruno Arrabal †
—	MF	BRA	Ilaílson
—	MF	BRA	Warian Santos †

No.	Pos.	Nation	Player
—	MF	BRA	Michel Schmöller
—	MF	BRA	Dadá
—	MF	BRA	Régis
—	MF	BRA	Jhonnatan
—	MF	BRA	André
—	MF	BRA	Ted †
—	MF	BRA	Ratinho
—	MF	BRA	Eduardo Ramos †
—	MF	BRA	Thiago Potiguar
—	MF	BRA	Athos †
—	MF	BRA	Danilo Rios
—	MF	BRA	Reis
—	MF	BRA	Marcinho
—	FW	BRA	Zé Soares †
—	FW	BRA	Rony
—	FW	BRA	Leandrão †
—	FW	BRA	Rafael Paty
—	FW	BRA	Val Barreto
—	FW	BRA	Leandro Cearense

=== Kit ===
Supplier: Umbro

Home	Home alt. 1	Home alt. 2	Home alt. 3	Away	Away alt. 1

=== Transfers in ===
Position	Name	Transferred from	Source
DF	Levy	(Brazil) Baraúnas	
MF	André	(Brazil) Botafogo-SP	
MF	Ratinho	(Brazil) Paragominas	
DF	Rubran	(Brazil) Paragominas	
MF	Ted	(Brazil) Guarany de Sobral	
GK	Maycki Douglas	(Brazil) Paragominas	
FW	Zé Soares	(Ukraine) Metalurh Donetsk	
DF	Rodrigo Fernandes	(Brazil) Betim	
DF	Diogo Silva	(Brazil) ASA	
DF	Max	(Brazil) Betim	
FW	Leandrão	(Israel) Hapoel Acre	
DF	Rogélio	(Brazil) ABC	
MF	Eduardo Ramos	(Brazil) Paysandu	
MF	Athos	(Brazil) Chapecoense	
MF	Ilaílson	(Brazil) Paragominas	
MF	Thiago Potiguar	(South Korea) Jeonbuk Hyundai Motors	
MF	Bruno Arrabal	(Brazil) Duque de Caxias	
MF	Dadá	(Brazil) Náutico	
DF	Raphael Andrade	(Brazil) Bragantino	
FW	Rafael Paty	(Brazil) Santa Cruz de Cuiarana	
MF	Robinho	(Brazil) Cametá	
MF	Reis	(Brazil) Internacional	
MF	Michel Schmöller	(Brazil) ABC	
MF	Marcinho	(Brazil) Linense	
MF	Régis	(Brazil) América de Natal	
MF	Danilo Rios	(Brazil) Fortaleza	
DF	Negretti	(Brazil) Treze	
DF	Jadílson	(Brazil) Águia de Marabá	

=== Transfers out ===
Position	Name	Transferred to	Source
MF	Eduardo Ramos	(Brazil) Joinville (loan)	
MF	Athos	(Brazil) Treze	

== Competitions ==
=== Campeonato Brasileiro Série D ===
==== Group stage ====
Pos	Team	Pld	W	D	L	GF	GA	GD	Pts
1	Moto Club (A)	8	4	4	0	15	9	+6	16
2	Remo (A)	8	4	2	2	15	10	+5	14
3	Ríver	8	3	4	1	16	9	+7	9
4	Guarany de Sobral	8	2	0	6	9	20	–11	6
5	Interporto	8	1	2	5	9	16	–7	5

===== Matches =====
20 July 2014 1	Remo	1–1	Moto Club	Bragança
15:30 UTC−3	Val Barreto 90+4' (pen.)	Report	Fabiano 32'	Stadium: Diogão; Attendance: 4,627; Referee: Éder Caxias Meneses

27 July 2014 2	River	1–1	Remo	Teresina
16:00 UTC−3	Eduardo 90+2' (pen.)	Report	Michel Schmöller 73'	Stadium: Albertão; Attendance: 3,860; Referee: Leandro Saraiva Dantas de Oliveira

2 August 2014 3	Interporto	1–2	Remo	Porto Nacional
16:00 UTC−3	Heder 88'	Report	Max 10'; Rafael Paty 57'	Stadium: Estádio General Sampaio; Attendance: 755; Referee: Breno Veira Souza

17 August 2014 4	Remo	0–1	Guarany de Sobral	Bragança
15:30 UTC−3		Report	Tininho 39'	Stadium: Diogão; Attendance: 3,397; Referee: Gilberto Rodrigues Castro Júnior

24 August 2014 5	Guarany de Sobral	2–4	Remo	Sobral
17:00 UTC−3	Fabrício Manini 30'; Rodrigo Dantas 44' (pen.)	Report	Rony 5', 73'; Leandro Cearense 17', 47'	Stadium: Estádio do Junco; Attendance: 1,022; Referee: Caio Max Augusto Vieira

7 September 2014 6	Remo	3–0	Interporto	Bragança
15:30 UTC−3	Leandro Cearense 15'; Valdo 43' (o.g.); Ratinho 90'	Report		Stadium: Diogão; Attendance: 1,753; Referee: Valdicleuson Silva da Costa

14 September 2014 7	Remo	3–2	River	Bragança
15:30 UTC−3	Reis 1'; Michel Schmöller 54'; Val Barreto 90+1'	Report	Warley 24', 61'	Stadium: Diogão; Attendance: 3,835; Referee: Suelson Diógenes de França Medeiros

21 September 2014 8	Moto Club	2–1	Remo	São Luís
17:00 UTC−3	Gabriel 44'; Fernando Fonseca 67'	Report	Danilo Rios 5'	Stadium: Castelão; Attendance: 6,493; Referee: Gilberto Freire de Farias

==== Knockout stage ====
===== Round of 16 =====
28 September 2014 First leg	Remo	1–2	Brasiliense	Belém
16:00 UTC−3	Val Barreto 67'	Report	Felipe 15'; Rodrigo Andrade 29'	Stadium: Mangueirão; Attendance: 18,864; Referee: Nielson Nogueira Dias

4 October 2014 Second leg	Brasiliense	1–1 (3–2 agg.)	Remo	Taguatinga
16:00 UTC−3	Claudecir 57'	Report	Leandro Cearense 65'	Stadium: Serejão; Attendance: 1,976; Referee: Ítalo Medeiros de Azevedo

Notes

4. Punishment compliance of 4 matches away from Belém.

=== Campeonato Paraense ===
==== First round ====
Pos	Team	Pld	W	D	L	GF	GA	GD	Pts	Qualification
1	Paysandu (A)	7	4	1	2	16	8	+8	13	Qualifies to the Final stage
2	Remo (A)	7	4	1	2	12	6	+6	13	Qualifies to the Final stage
3	Cametá (A)	7	3	2	2	7	5	+2	11	Qualifies to the Final stage
4	Paragominas (A)	7	2	4	1	9	8	+1	10	Qualifies to the Final stage
5	Independente	7	1	5	1	5	6	−1	8	

Source: Radio clube do para
Rules for classification: 1) points; 2) goal difference; 3) number of goals scored.
(A) Advance to a further round

===== Matches =====
13 January 2014 1	Remo	2–1	Cametá	Belém
20:30 UTC−3	Eduardo Ramos 26'; Alex Ruan 90'	Report	Gil Cametá 75'	Stadium: Mangueirão; Attendance: 16,253; Referee: Joelson Nazareno Ferreira Cardoso

16 January 2014 2	Independente	0–2	Remo	Belém
20:30 UTC−3		Report	Eduardo Ramos 6' (pen.); Diogo Silva 48'	Stadium: Mangueirão; Attendance: 6,170; Referee: Dewson Fernando Freitas da Silva

19 January 2014 3	Remo	2–1	Santa Cruz de Cuiarana	Belém
16:00 UTC−3	Leandrão 24'; Rogélio 62'	Report	Rafael Paty 52'	Stadium: Mangueirão; Attendance: 10,260; Referee: Edeval Augusto Ferreira Figueiredo

22 January 2014 4	São Francisco	1–1	Remo	Santarém
20:30 UTC−3	Caçula 22'	Report	Thiago Potiguar 78'	Stadium: Estádio Municipal Colosso do Tapajós; Attendance: 4,951; Referee: Dewson Fernando Freitas da Silva

26 January 2014 5	Remo	1–2	Paysandu	Belém
16:00 UTC−3	Zé Soares 46'	Report	Rogélio 16' (o.g.); Lima 35'	Stadium: Mangueirão; Attendance: 16,914; Referee: Marcelo de Lima Henrique

29 January 2014 6	Remo	4–0	Gavião Kyikatejê	Belém
20:30 UTC−3	André 22'; Carlinho Rech 47'; Val Barreto 52', 61'	Report		Stadium: Mangueirão; Attendance: 6,776; Referee: Marcos Antônio da Silva Mendonça

2 February 2014 7	Paragominas	1–0	Remo	Paragominas
16:00 UTC−3	Aleílson 2'	Report		Stadium: Estádio Arena do Município Verde; Attendance: 3,800; Referee: Wasley do Couto

===== Final stage =====
====== Semi-finals ======
6 February 2014 First leg	Cametá	0–2	Remo	Cametá
20:30 UTC−3		Report	Leandrão 7'; Ratinho 89'	Stadium: Parque do Bacurau; Attendance: 5,030; Referee: Andrey da Silva e Silva

9 February 2014 Second leg	Remo	4–1 (6–1 agg.)	Cametá	Belém
16:00 UTC−3	Zé Soares 45+1'; Rogélio 48'; Eduardo Ramos 72' (pen.); Athos 86'	Report	Jaílson 51'	Stadium: Mangueirão; Attendance: 12,541; Referee: Joelson Nazareno Ferreira Cardoso

====== Finals ======
16 February 2014 First leg	Paysandu	0–0	Remo	Belém
16:00 UTC−3		Report		Stadium: Mangueirão; Attendance: 20,607; Referee: Francisco Carlos Nascimento

23 February 2014 Second leg	Remo	1–1 (1–1 agg.)	Paysandu	Belém
16:00 UTC−3	Val Barreto 27'	Report	Zé Antônio 75'	Stadium: Mangueirão; Attendance: 26,103; Referee: Wilson Luiz Seneme

==== Second round ====
Pos	Team	Pld	W	D	L	GF	GA	GD	Pts	Qualification
1	Paysandu (A)	7	4	3	0	15	6	+9	15	Qualifies to the Final stage
2	Remo (A)	7	3	4	0	13	8	+5	13	Qualifies to the Final stage
3	Independente (A)	7	4	0	3	10	10	0	12	Qualifies to the Final stage
4	São Francisco (A)	7	3	2	2	11	9	+2	11	Qualifies to the Final stage
5	Cametá	7	2	3	2	9	12	−3	9	

Source: Radio clube do para
Rules for classification: 1) points; 2) goal difference; 3) number of goals scored.
(A) Advance to a further round

===== Matches =====
6 March 2014 1	Cametá	2–2	Remo	Cametá
20:30 UTC−3	Robinho 55', 60'	Report	Thiago Potiguar 25'; Diogo Silva 76'	Stadium: Parque do Bacurau; Attendance: 1,720; Referee: Dewson Fernando Freitas da Silva

19 March 2014 2	Santa Cruz de Cuiarana	3–3	Remo	Castanhal
20:30 UTC−3	Rafael Paty 51', 72'; Charles 69'	Report	Athos 24'; Levy 87'; Leandro Cearense 90'	Stadium: Estádio Maximino Porpino; Attendance: 1,427; Referee: Andrey da Silva e Silva

26 March 2014 3	Remo	1–1	São Francisco	Belém
20:30 UTC−3	Rony 82'	Report	Boquinha 53'	Stadium: Mangueirão; Attendance: 3,650; Referee: Benedito Pinto da Silva

30 March 2014 4	Paysandu	0–0	Remo	Belém
16:00 UTC−3		Report		Stadium: Mangueirão; Attendance: 9,710; Referee: Ricardo Marques Ribeiro

2 April 2014 5	Remo	3–0	Independente	Belém
20:30 UTC−3	Leandro Cearense 8', 46'; Rony 90'	Report		Stadium: Mangueirão; Attendance: 1,860; Referee: Joelson Nazareno Ferreira Cardoso

6 April 2014 6	Gavião Kyikatejê	1–2	Remo	Marabá
16:00 UTC−3	Peri 3'	Report	Leandro Cearense 16', 22'	Stadium: Estádio Zinho de Oliveira; Attendance: 340; Referee: Wasley do Couto

13 April 2014 7	Remo	2–1	Paragominas	Belém
16:00 UTC−3	André 45'; Val Barreto 79' (pen.)	Report	Buiú 69'	Stadium: Baenão; Attendance: 8,807; Referee: Joelson Silva dos Santos

===== Final stage =====
====== Semi-finals ======
20 April 2014 First leg	Independente	3–0	Remo	Tucuruí
17:00 UTC−3	Léo Rosa 25'; Wegno 49'; Douglas Tandu 71'	Report		Stadium: Navegantão; Attendance: 2,079; Referee: Edeval Augusto Ferreira Figueiredo

1 May 2014 Second leg	Remo	4–0 (4–3 agg.)	Independente	Belém
16:00 UTC−3	Rony 46'; Ratinho 57', 65'; Leandro Cearense 87' (pen.)	Report		Stadium: Baenão; Attendance: 5,430; Referee: Joelson Silva dos Santos

====== Finals ======
22 May 2014 First leg	Remo	2–2	Paysandu	Belém
20:30 UTC−3	Eduardo Ramos 39'; Val Barreto 66' (pen.)	Report	Augusto Recife 23' (pen.); Yago Pikachu 31'	Stadium: Mangueirão; Attendance: 6,482; Referee: Dewson Fernando Freitas da Silva

28 May 2014 Second leg	Paysandu	3–3 (5–5 agg.)	Remo	Belém
20:30 UTC−3	Lima 58'; Augusto Recife 80' (pen.); Zé Antônio 90+3'	Report	Leandro Cearense 6'; Raphael Andrade 21'; Rubran 70'	Stadium: Mangueirão; Attendance: 10,017; Referee: Joelson Nazareno Ferreira Cardoso

==== Finals ====
4 June 2014 First leg	Paysandu	1–4	Remo	Belém
20:30 UTC−3	Héliton 73'	Report	Charles 12' (o.g.); Jhonnatan 47'; Leandro Cearense 76'; Ratinho 85'	Stadium: Mangueirão; Attendance: 10,463; Referee: Leandro Pedro Vuaden

8 June 2014 Second leg	Remo	0–2 (4–3 agg.)	Paysandu	Belém
16:00 UTC−3		Report	Dennis 8'; Yago Pikachu 25'	Stadium: Mangueirão; Attendance: 18,415; Referee: Héber Roberto Lopes

=== Copa Verde ===
==== Round of 16 ====
13 February 2014 First leg	Paragominas	1–2	Remo	Paragominas
20:30 UTC−3	Aleílson 55'	Report	Max 17'; Leandro Cearense 35' (pen.)	Stadium: Estádio Arena do Município Verde; Attendance: 1,779; Referee: Andrey da Silva e Silva

20 February 2014 Second leg	Remo	4–2 (6–3 agg.)	Paragominas	Belém
21:30 UTC−3	Val Barreto 44'; Athos 76'; Leandro Cearense 82'; Thiago Potiguar 90+1'	Report	Aleílson 29'; Fabrício 62'	Stadium: Mangueirão; Attendance: 10,904; Referee: Wasley do Couto

==== Quarter-finals ====
27 February 2014 First leg	Remo	1–1	Nacional	Belém
19:30 UTC−3	Zé Soares 65'	Report	Fabiano 32'	Stadium: Mangueirão; Attendance: 8,329; Referee: Jânio Pires Gonçalves

9 March 2014 Second leg	Nacional	2–2 (3–3 (a) agg.)	Remo	Manaus
19:30 UTC−3	Jefferson Recife 74'; Nando 86'	Report	Max 32', 59'	Stadium: Arena da Amazônia; Attendance: 9,875; Referee: Wagner Reway

==== Semi-finals ====
16 March 2014 First leg	Paysandu	1–0	Remo	Belém
18:30 UTC−3	Héverton 49'	Report		Stadium: Mangueirão; Attendance: 19,897; Referee: Wilton Sampaio

23 March 2014 Second leg	Remo	0–0 (0–1 agg.)	Paysandu	Belém
19:30 UTC−3		Report		Stadium: Mangueirão; Attendance: 26,582; Referee: Péricles Bassols Pegado Cortez

=== Copa do Brasil ===
==== First round ====
12 March 2014 First leg	Remo	1–6	Internacional	Belém
22:00 UTC−3	Val Barreto 80'	Report	Fabrício 19'; Rafael Moura 42', 85'; Max 51' (o.g.); Aránguiz 68' (pen.); Alex 72'	Stadium: Mangueirão; Attendance: 6,474; Referee: Antônio Dib Moraes de Sousa
