= 2021 Campeonato Paraense =

Campeonato Paraense
- Season: 2021
- Champions: Paysandu
- Relegated: Carajás; Gavião Kyikatejê
- Série D: Tuna Luso; Castanhal
- Copa Verde: Paysandu; Tuna Luso
- Copa do Brasil: Paysandu; Tuna Luso; Remo (via Copa Verde); Castanhal
- Matches: 63
- Goals: 161 (2.56 per match)
- Top goalscorer: Cris Maranhense; Paulo Rangel (8 goals each)
- Biggest home win: Remo 4–1 Gavião Kyikatejê (1 March 2021); Tuna Luso 4–1 Paragominas (3 April 2021); Paysandu 4–1 Tuna Luso (23 May 2021)
- Biggest away win: Gavião Kyikatejê 1–6 Tuna Luso (20 April 2021)
- Highest scoring: Tuna Luso 5–3 Bragantino (28 April 2021); Bragantino 4–4 Paragominas (18 April 2021)

The 2021 Campeonato Paraense was the 109th edition of Pará's top professional football league. The competition started on 27 February and ended on 23 May. Paysandu won the championship for the 49th time.

== Format ==
Three groups with four clubs, with the teams of one group facing those of the other two. The top two in each group advance to the final stage, along with the top two placed third. The matches of the quarter-finals, semi-finals, third place play-off and the finals will be played on a home-and-away two-legged basis.

The two worst teams in the overall standings will be relegated to the 2022 Campeonato Paraense Second Division.

The champion and the best placed team not qualified via CBF ranking qualify to the 2022 Copa Verde. The champion, the runner-up and the 3rd-placed team qualify to the 2022 Copa do Brasil. The best two teams who isn't on Campeonato Brasileiro Série A, Série B or Série C qualifies to 2022 Campeonato Brasileiro Série D.

== Participating teams ==
Club	Home city	2020 result
Águia de Marabá	Marabá	6th
Bragantino	Bragança	5th
Carajás	Belém	10th
Castanhal	Castanhal	3rd
Gavião Kyikatejê	Bom Jesus do Tocantins	2nd (On 2nd Division)
Independente	Tucuruí	8th
Itupiranga	Itupiranga	7th
Paragominas	Paragominas	4th
Paysandu	Belém	1st
Remo	Belém	2nd
Tapajós	Santarém	9th
Tuna Luso	Belém	1st (On 2nd Division)

== Group stage ==
=== Group A ===
Pos	Team	Pld	W	D	L	GF	GA	GD	Pts	Qualification or relegation
1	Paysandu (A)	8	6	1	1	12	6	+6	19	Advance to the Final stage
2	Itupiranga (A)	8	3	2	3	4	5	−1	11	Advance to the Final stage
3	Bragantino (A)	8	1	5	2	15	16	−1	8	Advance to the Final stage
4	Gavião Kyikatejê (R)	8	0	3	5	8	21	−13	3	2022 Paraense 2nd Division

Source: Globo Esporte
(A) Advance to a further round; (R) Relegated

=== Group B ===
Pos	Team	Pld	W	D	L	GF	GA	GD	Pts	Qualification or relegation
1	Remo (A)	8	6	2	0	18	9	+9	20	Advance to the Final stage
2	Tuna Luso (A)	8	3	3	2	20	13	+7	12	Advance to the Final stage
3	Tapajós	8	1	4	3	7	9	−2	7	
4	Carajás (R)	8	1	2	5	5	11	−6	5	2022 Paraense 2nd Division

Source: Globo Esporte
(A) Advance to a further round; (R) Relegated

=== Group C ===
Pos	Team	Pld	W	D	L	GF	GA	GD	Pts	Qualification or relegation
1	Independente (A)	8	3	4	1	10	6	+4	13	Advance to the Final stage
2	Castanhal (A)	8	2	5	1	11	9	+2	11	Advance to the Final stage
3	Águia de Marabá (A)	8	1	5	2	6	7	−1	8	Advance to the Final stage
4	Paragominas	8	1	4	3	10	14	−4	7	

Source: Globo Esporte
(A) Advance to a further round

== Final stage ==
=== Quarter-finals ===
1 May 2021
16:00 UTC –3

Águia de Marabá	1–3	Remo
Echeverría 71'	Report	Lucas Tocantins 1'; Felipe Gedoz 31'; Edson Cariús 73'

Estádio Municipal Zinho de Oliveira, Marabá
Attendance: 0
Referee: Joelson Nazareno Ferreira Cardoso
4 May 2021
19:00 UTC –3

Remo	1–0	Águia de Marabá
Edson Cariús 77'	Report

Baenão, Belém
Attendance: 0
Referee: Rodolpho Toski Marques

Remo won 4–1 on aggregate and advanced to the semi-finals.

2 May 2021
16:00 UTC –3

Itupiranga	0–3	Tuna Luso
	Report	Lukinha 45'; Alexandre Pinho 45+3'; Lineker 90+4'

Estádio Municipal Zinho de Oliveira, Marabá
Attendance: 0
Referee: Djonaltan Costa de Araújo
5 May 2021
15:00 UTC –3

Tuna Luso	0–1	Itupiranga
	Report	Índio 88'

Estádio Francisco Vasques, Belém
Attendance: 0
Referee: Andrey da Silva e Silva

Tuna Luso won 3–1 on aggregate and advanced to the semi-finals.

2 May 2021
15:30 UTC –3

Bragantino	0–0	Paysandu
	Report

Diogão, Bragança
Attendance: 0
Referee: Marco José Soares de Almeida
5 May 2021
19:00 UTC –3

Paysandu	1–0	Bragantino
Elyeser 83'	Report

Estádio da Curuzu, Belém
Attendance: 0
Referee: Dewson Fernando Freitas da Silva

Paysandu won 1–0 on aggregate and advanced to the semi-finals.

2 May 2021
10:00 UTC –3

Castanhal	1–1	Independente
Gui Campana 20'	Report	Raílson 30'

Estádio Maximino Porpino Filho, Castanhal
Attendance: 0
Referee: Olivaldo José Alves Moraes
5 May 2021
16:00 UTC –3

Independente	1–2	Castanhal
Yuri 20'	Report	Pecel 78', 89' (pen.)

Navegantão, Tucuruí
Attendance: 0
Referee: Nadílson Sousa dos Santos

Castanhal won 3–2 on aggregate and advanced to the semi-finals.

=== Semi-finals ===
9 May 2021
10:00 UTC –3

Tuna Luso	1–1	Remo
Léo Rosa 34' (pen.)	Report	Anderson Uchôa 20'

Estádio Francisco Vasques, Belém
Attendance: 0
Referee: Joelson Silva dos Santos
12 May 2021
19:15 UTC –3

Remo	1–1	Tuna Luso
Dedé 11' (o.g.)	Report	Dedé 83'
Penalties
Renan Gorne (penalty scored); Renan Oliveira (penalty missed); Marlon (penalty scored); Vinícius Kiss (penalty scored); Felipe Gedoz (penalty scored); Rafael Jansen (penalty scored); Erick Flores (penalty missed)	5–6	(penalty missed) Léo Rosa; (penalty scored) Renan; (penalty scored) Kauê; (penalty scored) Lukinha; (penalty scored) Paulo Rangel; (penalty scored) Alexandre Pinho; (penalty scored) Lineker

Baenão, Belém
Attendance: 0
Referee: Djonaltan Costa de Araújo

Tied 2–2 on aggregate, Tuna Luso won on penalties and advanced to the finals.

9 May 2021
15:30 UTC –3

Castanhal	0–0	Paysandu
	Report

Estádio Maximino Porpino Filho, Castanhal
Attendance: 0
Referee: Gustavo Ramos Melo
12 May 2021
15:45 UTC –3

Paysandu	1–1	Castanhal
Ari Moura 50'	Report	Fidélis 60'
Penalties
Nicolas (penalty scored); Ratinho (penalty scored); Jhonnatan (penalty scored); Perema (penalty scored)	4–2	(penalty scored) Fidélis; (penalty missed) Pecel; (penalty scored) Canga; (penalty missed) Leandro Cabecinha

Estádio da Curuzu, Belém
Attendance: 0
Referee: Marco José Soares de Almeida

Tied 1–1 on aggregate, Paysandu won on penalties and advanced to the finals.

=== Third place play-off ===
15 May 2021
17:00 UTC –3

Remo	3–0	Castanhal
Lucas Siqueira 33'; Fredson 46'; Felipe Gedoz 53'	Report

Baenão, Belém
Attendance: 0
Referee: Gustavo Ramos Melo

=== Finals ===
16 May 2021
10:00 UTC –3

Tuna Luso	4–2	Paysandu
Léo Rosa 13'; Alexandre Pinho 21'; Lukinha 62'; Paulo Rangel 85'	Report	Perema 79'; Gabriel Barbosa 87'

Estádio Francisco Vasques, Belém
Attendance: 0
Referee: Dewson Fernando Freitas da Silva
23 May 2021
17:00 UTC –3

Paysandu	4–1	Tuna Luso
Igor Goularte 14'; Gabriel Barbosa 64', 75', 79'	Report	Paulo Rangel 6' (pen.)

Estádio da Curuzu, Belém
Attendance: 0
Referee: Marco José Soares de Almeida

Paysandu won 6–5 on aggregate.
