= Evandro Gigante =

Brazilian footballer

Personal information
- Full name: Evandro Cardoso de Sousa
- Date of birth: 17 November 1985 (age 40)
- Place of birth: Belém, Brazil
- Height: 1.94 m (6 ft 4 in)
- Position: Goalkeeper

Senior career*
Years	Team	Apps	(Gls)
2010–2013	Cametá		
2013	Time Negra		
2014–2015	Guaraí		
2015	Pinheirense		
2016	São Raimundo-PA		
2016	Pinheirense		
2017	Independente-PA		
2017–2019	Remo		
2017	→ Carajás (loan)		
2018	→ Tuna Luso (loan)		
2019	Cametá		
2020	Independente-PA		
2020	Potyguar Seridoense		
2020	Pinheirense		
2021	Tuna Luso		
2021	Izabelense		
2022	Itupiranga		
2022	Rio Branco-AC		
2022	Santa Rosa		
2023	São Francisco-PA		
2024–	Rio Branco-AC		
- * Club domestic league appearances and goals as of 30 October 2023

Evandro Cardoso de Sousa (born 17 November 1985), better known as Evandro Gigante, is a Brazilian professional footballer who plays as a goalkeeper.

== Career ==
A goalkeeper who played for several teams in the north region of Brazil, Evandro stood out nationally when he scored a goal playing for Rio Branco, against Amazonas, in the 2022 Campeonato Brasileiro Série D.

In 2023, Evandro defended São Francisco de Santarém in the Campeonato Paraense. He signed with Rio Branco-AC for the 2024 season.

== Honours ==
Cametá

- Campeonato Paraense: 2012

Carajás

- Campeonato Paraense Second Division: 2013

Guaraí

- Campeonato Tocantinense Second Division: 2014

Pinheirense

- Campeonato Paraense Second Division: 2016

Remo

- Campeonato Paraense: 2018, 2019

== See also ==
- List of goalscoring goalkeepers
