= Everson Bilau =

Brazilian footballer (born 1990)

Personal information
- Full name: Everson da Silva Santana
- Date of birth: 17 April 1990 (age 36)
- Place of birth: Santa Isabel do Pará, Brazil
- Position: Forward

Youth career
- –2009: Castanhal

Senior career*
Years	Team	Apps	(Gls)
2009	Castanhal		
2010–2012	Tuna Luso		
2013–2015	Manaus		
2016–2017	São Raimundo-PA		
2017	Parauapebas		
2018	Castanhal		
2018	Izabelense		
2019	Paragominas		
2019	São Raimundo-PA		
2019	Bragantino-PA		
2019	Tuna Luso		
2020	Bragantino-PA		
2020	Nacional-AM		
2020	Amazonas		
2020	Venus-PA		
2021–2023	Tocantinópolis		
2022	→ Mixto (loan)		
2023	Imperatriz		
2024	Tocantinópolis		
2024	Izabelense		
2025–	Castanhal		
- * Club domestic league appearances and goals as of 16 January 2025

Everson da Silva Santana (born 17 April 1990), better known as Everson Bilau, is a Brazilian professional footballer who plays as a forward.

== Career ==
Started at Castanhal EC, he competed for the club in the 2009 edition of the Copa São Paulo de Futebol Júnior. He played most of his career in modest teams in Pará, until arriving at Manaus in 2013 and São Raimundo in 2016, where he played in national competitions. At Tocantinópolis, he had the greatest projection so far, being state champion three times and competing in the Copa do Brasil and Copa Verde. Everson was loaned to Mixto for the FMF Cup in 2022. He conquered the access to the first division of Maranhão with Imperatriz in the second half of 2023.

== Personal life ==
The player causes a lot of repercussion on social media due to his nickname, which in Portuguese means "wiener". According to Everson, he earned his nickname for always coming out ahead in ball disputes.

== Honours ==
Tocantinópolis

- Campeonato Tocantinense: 2021, 2022, 2023
