= Gabriel Lima =

Gabriel Lima may refer to:

- Gabriel Lima (footballer, born 1978), Brazilian football striker
- Gabriel Lima (futsal player) (born 1987), Italian futsal player
- Gabriel Lima (footballer, born 1996), Brazilian football forward
