= Danilinho =

Danilinho is the name of:

- Danilinho (footballer, born 1985) (Danilo Caçador), Brazilian footballer
- Danilinho (footballer, born 1987) (Danilo Veron Bairros), Brazilian footballer

== See also ==
- Danilo
