= Perema (footballer) =

Brazilian footballer (born 1992)

Personal information
- Full name: Auricélio Soares dos Santos
- Date of birth: 27 July 1992 (age 34)
- Place of birth: Santarém, Brazil
- Height: 1.84 m (6 ft 0 in)
- Position: Centre back

Team information
- Current team: Náutico

Youth career
- 2011–2012: São Francisco-PA

Senior career*
Years	Team	Apps	(Gls)
2012–2016	São Francisco-PA	13	(1)
2012	→ Nacional-MG (loan)	0	(0)
2012	→ Águia de Marabá (loan)	1	(0)
2014	→ Duque de Caxias (loan)	15	(0)
2014	→ São Raimundo-PA (loan)	0	(0)
2015	→ Portuguesa (loan)	1	(0)
2017–2021	Paysandu	132	(5)
2022–2024	Concórdia	72	(5)
2022	→ Floresta (loan)	16	(0)
2024–	Náutico	0	(0)
- * Club domestic league appearances and goals as of 21 July 2024

Auricélio Soares dos Santos (born 27 July 1992), commonly known as Perema, is a Brazilian footballer who plays for Náutico as a central defender.

== Career ==
Born in Santarém, Pará, Perema graduated with São Francisco's youth setup, and made his debuts in the 2012 Campeonato Paraense. After impressing in the tournament he was loaned to Nacional de Nova Serrana on 26 April 2012.

Perema subsequently served loans at Águia Marabá and Duque de Caxias, representing both sides in Série C. On 11 October 2014 he joined São Raimundo-PA, also in a temporary deal.

On 27 January 2015 Perema signed for Portuguesa, on loan until June. He made his debut for the club on 22 February, coming on as a second half substitute for Fabinho Capixaba in a 1–3 home loss against Santos for the Campeonato Paulista championship.

== Honours ==
Paysandu

- Campeonato Paraense: 2017, 2020, 2021
- Copa Verde: 2018
