= Leandro Silva (footballer, born 1986) =

Brazilian footballer

Personal information
- Full name: Leandro Paulino da Silva
- Date of birth: 7 March 1986 (age 40)
- Place of birth: Iretama, Brazil
- Height: 1.83 m (6 ft 0 in)
- Position: Centre back

Team information
- Current team: Linense

Youth career
- Corinthians Paranaense

Senior career*
Years	Team	Apps	(Gls)
2007–2016	J. Malucelli	27	(5)
2008	→ Paraná (loan)	5	(2)
2009	→ Paraná (loan)	10	(0)
2010	→ Atlético Paranaense (loan)	12	(0)
2011	→ Portuguesa (loan)	25	(5)
2014	→ Boa Esporte (loan)	1	(0)
2015	→ Coritiba (loan)	32	(0)
2016	Paraná	29	(1)
2017	Água Santa	0	(0)
2017	Remo	13	(1)
2018–	Linense	0	(0)
- * Club domestic league appearances and goals as of 22 February 2018

Leandro Paulino Da Silva (born 7 April 1986 in Iretama), known as Leandro Silva, is a Brazilian footballer who plays for Linense as a central defender.

== Career ==
Played in the Atlético Paranaense and Corinthians Paranaense.
