= Emerson (footballer, born August 1982) =

Brazilian footballer

Personal information
- Full name: Emerson José da Conceição
- Date of birth: 3 August 1982 (age 44)
- Place of birth: Rancharia, Brazil
- Height: 1.87 m (6 ft 1 1/2 in)
- Position: Goalkeeper

Youth career
- 2000–?: Portuguesa Londrinense

Senior career*
Years	Team	Apps	(Gls)
2003–2004	Toledo		
2005–2006	XV de Jaú		
2006–2008	Iraty		
2008	→ Atlético Ibirama (loan)		
2009	Paulista		
2010	União São João	22	(0)
2010–2013	Guarani	131	(2)
2013	Mirassol	14	(0)
2013	Cuiabá	7	(0)
2014	Boa Esporte	17	(0)
2015–2017	Paysandu	99	(0)
2018	Joinville	14	(0)
2019	Londrina	2	(0)
2020–2021	DPMM	4	(0)
- * Club domestic league appearances and goals as of 8 December 2022

Emerson José da Conceição (born August 3, 1982, in Rancharia), known as Emerson or Emerson Conceição, is a Brazilian footballer who plays as a goalkeeper.

== Career statistics ==
As of 5 August 2021

Club	Season	League			State League		Cup		Conmebol		Other		Total	
Club	Season	Division	Apps	Goals	Apps	Goals	Apps	Goals	Apps	Goals	Apps	Goals	Apps	Goals
União São João	2010	Paulista A2	—		22	0	—		—		—		22	0
Guarani	2010	Série A	14	0	—		—		—		—		14	0
Guarani	2011	Série B	36	1	24	0	4	0	—		—		64	1
Guarani	2012	Série B	33	1	21	0	2	0	—		—		56	1
Guarani	2013	Série C	—		3	0	—		—		—		3	0
Guarani	Subtotal		83	2	48	0	6	0	—		—		137	2
Mirassol	2013	Paulista	—		14	0	—		—		—		14	0
Cuiabá	2013	Série C	7	0	—		—		—		—		7	0
Boa Esporte	2014	Série B	6	0	11	0	—		—		—		17	0
Paysandu	2015	Série B	34	0	9	0	7	0	—		2 (Note: All appearance(s) in Copa Verde)	0	52	0
Paysandu	2016	Série B	35	0	11	0	6	0	—		8	0	60	0
Paysandu	2017	Série B	0	0	6	0	0	0	—		—		6	0
Paysandu	Subtotal		69	0	26	0	13	0	—		10	0	118	0
Joinville	2018	Série C	7	0	7	0	—		—		—		14	0
Londrina	2019	Série B	1	0	1	0	—		—		—		2	0
DPMM FC	2020	SPL	1	0	—		0	0	—		0	0	1	0
DPMM FC	2021	BSL	3	0	—		0	0	—		0	0	3	0
DPMM FC	Subtotal		4	0	0	0	0	0	—		0	0	4	0
Career total			177	2	129	0	19	0	0	0	10	0	335	2

== Honours ==
Paysandu

- Campeonato Paraense: 2016, 2017
- Copa Verde: 2016
