= Wesley Dias =

Brazilian footballer

- Wesley with Botafogo-SP in 2025

Personal information
- Full name: Wesley Dias Claudino
- Date of birth: 22 June 1995 (age 31)
- Place of birth: Campinas, Brazil
- Height: 1.81 m (5 ft 11 in)
- Position: Midfielder

Team information
- Current team: Cuiabá
- Number: 70

Youth career
- Primavera
- 2015: Guarani

Senior career*
Years	Team	Apps	(Gls)
2014	Paulínia	19	(0)
2016	Guarani	16	(0)
2017–2020	Estoril	9	(0)
2017	→ Paysandu (loan)	21	(2)
2018	→ Paraná (loan)	23	(0)
2019	→ Vitória (loan)	5	(0)
2019	→ CRB (loan)	5	(0)
2020	→ ABC (loan)	2	(0)
2020	Ermis Aradippou	2	(0)
2021	Ferroviário	29	(0)
2022–2023	Sampaio Corrêa	14	(1)
2023	→ Botafogo-PB (loan)	25	(1)
2024	São Bernardo	29	(0)
2025–2026	Água Santa	12	(0)
2025	→ Botafogo-SP (loan)	20	(1)
2026–	Cuiabá	11	(1)
- * Club domestic league appearances and goals as of 13:46, 19 November 2026 (UTC)

Wesley Dias Claudino (born 22 June 1995), known as Wesley Dias or just Wesley, is a Brazilian professional footballer who plays as a midfielder for Cuiabá.

== Career ==
Born in Campinas, São Paulo, Wesley played in the youth categories of Primavera before making his senior debut with Paulínia in the 2014 Campeonato Paulista Segunda Divisão. In March of the following year, he joined Guarani and returned to youth football, before being promoted to the first team in 2016.

In December 2016, Wesley left Bugre for Série B side Paysandu, on loan from Portuguese club Estoril. On 29 June 2017, he returned to his parent club as his loan expired, and he made his Primeira Liga debut on 9 August, in a 4–0 away loss to Porto.

On 25 January 2018, Wesley was loaned to Paraná in the Série A. Regularly used as the club suffered relegation, he moved to Vitória also in a temporary deal on 4 January 2019.

On 6 August 2019, Wesley was announced at CRB, still owned by Estoril. He then served another loan stint at ABC, before moving to Cypriot First Division club Ermis Aradippou on 2 July 2020.

On 31 December 2020, after just two matches, Wesley returned to his home country and signed for Ferroviário. In December 2021, he agreed to a deal back with ABC, but the deal later collapsed and he joined Sampaio Corrêa shortly after.

On 9 February 2023, after being rarely used, Wesley was loaned to Botafogo-PB until the end of the year. Ahead of the 2024 season, he moved to São Bernardo, and helped the club to achieve promotion from the Série C.

Wesley began the 2025 campaign at Água Santa, but was loaned to second division Botafogo-SP on 19 March of that year. He returned to his parent club after his loan ended, but joined Cuiabá on 7 July 2026. He only made his debut for the club on 19 August, scoring the winner in a 1–0 home success over Operário Ferroviário.

== Career statistics ==
As of 19 November 2026

Club	Season	League			State league (Note: Includes Campeonato Paulista 2ª Divisão, Campeonato Paulista Série A2, Campeonato Paraense, Campeonato Paranaense, Campeonato Baiano, Campeonato Potiguar, Campeonato Cearense, Campeonato Maranhense, Campeonato Paraibano)		National cup (Note: Includes Copa do Brasil, Taça de Portugal, Cypriot Cup)		Continental		Other		Total	
Club	Season	Division	Apps	Goals	Apps	Goals	Apps	Goals	Apps	Goals	Apps	Goals	Apps	Goals
Paulínia	2014	Paulista 2ª Divisão	—		19	0	—		—		—		19	0
Guarani	2016	Série C	7	0	9	0	—		—		—		16	0
Estoril	2016–17	Primeira Liga	0	0	—		—		—		—		0	0
Estoril	2017–18	Primeira Liga	9	0	—		1	0	—		1 (Note: Appearance(s) in Taça da Liga)	0	11	0
Estoril	Total		9	0	—		1	0	—		1	0	11	0
Paysandu (loan)	2017	Série B	9	1	12	1	2	0	—		7 (Note: Appearance(s) in Copa Verde)	0	30	2
Paraná (loan)	2018	Série A	16	0	7	0	2	0	—		—		25	0
Vitória (loan)	2019	Série B	0	0	5	0	0	0	—		2 (Note: Appearance(s) in Copa do Nordeste)	0	7	0
CRB (loan)	2019	Série B	5	0	—		—		—		—		5	0
ABC	2020	Série D	—		2	0	1	0	—		3	0	6	0
Ermis Aradippou	2020–21	Cypriot First Division	2	0	—		0	0	—		—		2	0
Ferroviário	2020	Série C	—		—		—		—		6 (Note: Appearance(s) in Taça Fares Lopes)	1	6	1
Ferroviário	2021	Série C	16	0	13	0	2	0	—		3	0	34	0
Ferroviário	Total		16	0	13	0	2	0	—		9	1	40	1
Sampaio Corrêa	2022	Série B	2	0	9	1	1	0	—		7	0	19	1
Sampaio Corrêa	2023	Série B	—		3	0	0	0	—		1	0	4	0
Sampaio Corrêa	Total		2	0	12	1	1	0	—		8	0	23	1
Botafogo-PB (loan)	2023	Série C	20	1	5	0	1	0	—		—		26	1
São Bernardo	2024	Série C	19	0	10	0	2	0	—		—		31	0
Água Santa	2025	Série D	—		8	0	—		—		—		8	0
Água Santa	2026	Série D	—		4	0	—		—		—		4	0
Água Santa	Total		—		12	0	—		—		—		12	0
Botafogo-SP (loan)	2025	Série B	20	1	—		—		—		2 (Note: Appearance(s) in Copa Paulista)	0	22	1
Cuiabá	2026	Série B	11	1	—		—		—		1 (Note: Appearance(s) in Copa FMF)	0	12	2
Career total			138	4	106	2	12	0	0	0	33	1	289	7

== Honours ==
Paysandu

- Campeonato Paraense: 2017

ABC

- Campeonato Potiguar: 2020

Ferroviário

- Taça Fares Lopes: 2020

Sampaio Corrêa

- Campeonato Maranhense: 2022

Cuiabá

- Copa FMF: 2026
