= Leandro Kivel =

Brazilian footballer (born 1983)

Personal information
- Full name: Leandro Araújo Kivel
- Date of birth: 11 June 1983 (age 43)
- Place of birth: São Borja, Brazil
- Height: 1.86 m (6 ft 1 in)
- Position: Forward

Youth career
- –2002: Grêmio

Senior career*
Years	Team	Apps	(Gls)
2002	Ulbra-RS		
2003	Atlético Paranaense		
2004	São Paulo-RS		
2005	Farroupilha		
2006	Santa Cruz-RS		
2006	Pelotas		
2007	Ulbra-RS		
2007	Guarany de Bagé		
2007	Cianorte		
2008	São Gabriel		
2008	Guarany de Bagé		
2009	Anápolis		
2009	Rio Claro		
2009	Anapolina		
2010	Ceilândia		
2010	Sinop		
2011	Luverdense		
2011	Portuguesa Santista		
2012	River Plate-SE		
2012	Brasil de Farroupilha		
2013	River Plate-SE		
2013	Sergipe		
2013	Sampaio Corrêa		
2014–2016	Confiança		
2017	ASA		
2018–2019	CSA		
2018	→ Botafogo-PB (loan)		
2019–2020	Confiança		
2024	Confiança		
- * Club domestic league appearances and goals as of 21 March 2024

Leandro Kivel (born 11 June 1983) is a Brazilian former professional footballer who played as a forward.

== Career ==
A forward revealed in Grêmio's youth categories, Kivel played for clubs in all parts of Brazil. In 2013, playing for River Plate de Carmópolis, and in 2016 he was top scorer in the Campeonato Sergipano, being champion of the competition on three occasions with AD Confiança.

He played in 2013 for Sampaio Corrêa, 2017 for ASA, and for CSA in 2018–2019, where he was champion of Alagoas, having a quick spell on loan at Botafogo-PB.

Kivel suffered a serious knee injury in 2019, while playing once again for Confiança, and his contract with the club ended at the end of 2020, contrary to Brazilian legislation that prohibits an injured athlete from having his employment relationship terminated. In 2023, he won the case from the labor court, being entitled to receive around R$ 420,000 in compensation. However, due to the fans' great affection for the player, the possibility of returning from forced retirement for another season of his professional contract appeared in 2024, with the player becoming official again in the Confiança squad on 13 March 2024. In April 2025, in an interview on a podcast, he announced his definitive retirement at age 41.

== Honours ==
Confiança

- Campeonato Sergipano: 2014, 2015, 2020, 2024

CSA

- Campeonato Alagoano: 2018

Individual

- Campeonato Sergipano top scorer: 2013, 2016
