= Salgado =

Municipality in Sergipe, Brazil

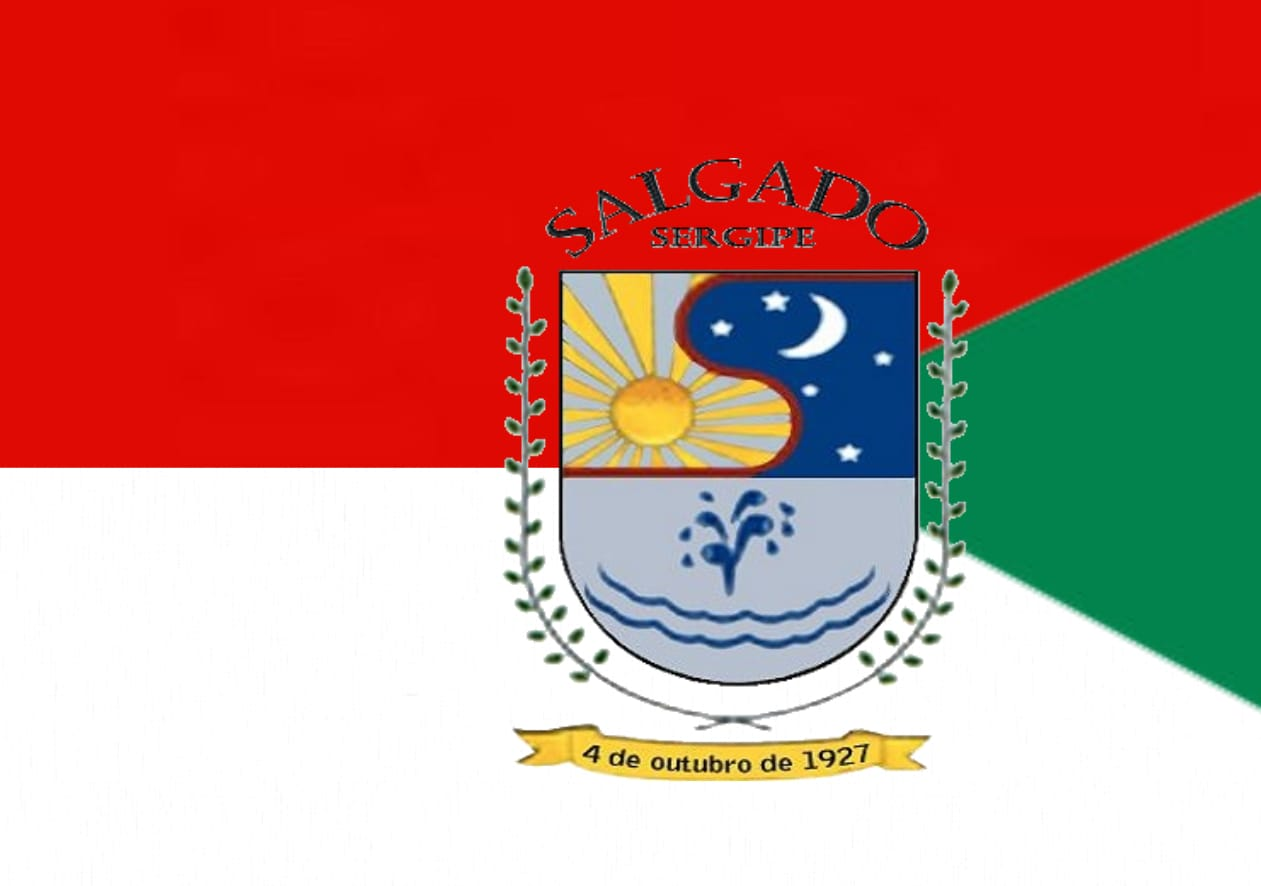
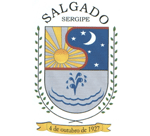
- Flag Coat of arms

- Location within Brazil
- Coordinates: 11°1′34.45″S 37°28′48.3″W?
- Country: Brazil
- State: Sergipe
- Established: 1927

Government
  - Mayor: Duilio Siqueira Ribeiro (PSB)

Area
  - City: 248 km^{2} (96 sq mi)
- Elevation: 100 m (330 ft)

Population (2020)
  - City: 20,025
  - Density: 80.58/km^{2} (208.7/sq mi)
  - Urban: 6,694
  - Rural: 12,671
- Demonym: Salgadense
- Area code: 79
- Website: https://www.salgado.se.gov.br/

Salgado (Brazilian Portuguese: [sawˈɡadu]) is a municipality located in the Brazilian state of Sergipe. It has an area of 248 km^{2} (96 sq mi) and an estimated population of 20,025 (2020).

== See also ==
- List of municipalities in Sergipe
