= Nino Guerreiro =

Brazilian footballer

Personal information
- Full name: Éderson da Silva Lima
- Date of birth: 11 October 1981 (age 45)
- Place of birth: Juazeiro, Brazil
- Height: 1.83 m (6 ft 0 in)
- Position: Forward

Youth career
- Juazeiro

Senior career*
Years	Team	Apps	(Gls)
2005–2008	Juazeiro		
2009	Mesquita		
2009	CRB		
2010	Madre de Deus		
2010	CRB		
2010	Juazeiro		
2011	Ypiranga-PE		
2011–2012	Juazeiro		
2012	Confiança		
2012–2014	CRAC		
2014	Anapolina		
2015	Atlético de Ibirama		
2015	Cuiabá		
2016	Juazeirense		
2017	CRAC		
2017	Remo		
2018	Sergipe		
2019–2022	Juazeirense		
2022	Operário-MT		
- * Club domestic league appearances and goals as of 1 November 2023

Éderson da Silva Lima (born 11 October 1981), better known as Nino Guerreiro, is a Brazilian former professional footballer who played as a forward.

== Career ==
Born in the city of Juazeiro, Nino Guerreiro stood out in particular in 2012 when he was top scorer in Série D for CRAC. He was state and Copa Verde champion with Cuiabá, in addition to important spells with Remo, Sergipe and Juazeirense. He ended his career at Operário-MT.

== Honours ==
Cuiabá

- Copa Verde: 2015
- Campeonato Mato-Grossense: 2015

Sergipe

- Campeonato Sergipano: 2018

Individual

- 2012 Campeonato Brasileiro Série D top scorer: 13 goals
