= Santiago Krieger =

Argentine footballer

Personal information
- Date of birth: 13 April 1995 (age 31)
- Place of birth: Coronel Suárez, Argentina
- Height: 1.91 m (6 ft 3 in)
- Position: Forward

Team information
- Current team: Rio Maior Sport Clube

Youth career
- Years: Team
- 2006–2009: FC Barcelona Juniors Luján
- 2009–2015: Boca Juniors
- 2016: Huracán
- 2017: Remo
- 2018-2019: Excursionistas
- 2020: Ypiranga
- 2021-2022: Rio Maior

Santiago "Nano" Krieger (born 13 April 1995) is an Argentine professional footballer who plays for Portugal club RMSC as a forward.
