= Gerson (footballer, born 1986) =

Brazilian footballer

Personal information
- Full name: Wagerson Ramos dos Santos
- Date of birth: 3 April 1986 (age 40)
- Place of birth: Valença, Rio de Janeiro, Brazil
- Height: 1.73 m (5 ft 8 in)
- Position: Left-back

Youth career
- 2004: Vasco da Gama

Senior career*
Years	Team	Apps	(Gls)
2007	Boavista		
2007	Duque de Caxias		
2008–2009	Cabofriense		
2008	→ Goytacaz (loan)		
2009	Volta Redonda		
2009–2010	America		
2010–2012	Fluminense	0	(0)
2011	→ Atlético Goianiense (loan)	1	(0)
2011	→ Goiás (loan)	2	(0)
2012	→ Macaé (loan)	0	(0)
2013	Macaé	0	(0)
2014	Resende	0	(0)
2015	Cabofriense	0	(0)
2016	Tricordiano	0	(0)
2017	Brasiliense	0	(0)
2017	Remo	8	(0)
2018	Brasiliense	0	(0)
2019	Operário-MS	0	(0)
2019	Artsul	0	(0)
2020	Macaé	0	(0)
- * Club domestic league appearances and goals

Wagerson Ramos dos Santos (3 April 1986), known as Gerson, is a Brazilian former professional footballer who played as a left-back.

== Career ==
In April 2010, Gerson signed a two-year contract with Fluminense. He was a reserve player during the 2010 season.

On 19 May 2011, Goianiense signed Gerson from Fluminense on loan until the end of the 2011 season.

On 22 September 2011, Gerson moved to Brazilian Série B side Goiás on a loan deal.

== Career statistics ==
(Correct as of 16 October 2010)

Club	Season	State League		Brazilian Série A		Copa do Brasil		Copa Libertadores		Copa Sudamericana		Total	
Club	Season	Apps	Goals	Apps	Goals	Apps	Goals	Apps	Goals	Apps	Goals	Apps	Goals
Fluminense	2010	-	-	0	0	-	-	-	-	-	-	0	0
Total		-	-	0	0	-	-	-	-	-	-	0	0

== Honours ==
América

- Campeonato Carioca Série B: 2009

Brasiliense

- Campeonato Brasiliense: 2017
