= Luiz Eduardo (footballer, born 1985) =

Brazilian footballer

Personal information
- Full name: Luiz Eduardo Azevedo Dantas
- Date of birth: 24 May 1985 (age 41)
- Place of birth: Parelhas, Brazil
- Height: 1.82 m (6 ft 0 in)
- Position: Forward

Senior career*
| Years | Team | Apps | (Gls) |
| 2005–2007 | ABC | | |
| 2007 | Ceará | | |
| 2008 | Santa Cruz | | |
| 2008 | ABC | | |
| 2008 | Social | | |
| 2009 | Caldense | | |
| 2009 | Volta Redonda | | |
| 2009 | Londrina | | |
| 2009–2012 | Montana | 79 | (18) |
| 2012 | Etar 1924 | 8 | (2) |
| 2013 | Adana Demirspor | 19 | (6) |
| 2014 | Caldense | 7 | (3) |
| 2014 | Boa Esporte Clube | 6 | (0) |
| 2015 | Caldense | 14 | (8) |
| 2015 | Luverdense | 15 | (3) |
| 2015–2017 | América FC | 33 | (5) |
| 2017 | Caldense | 15 | (8) |
| 2017 | Remo | 10 | (2) |
| 2018–2019 | Brasil de Pelotas | 29 | (3) |
| 2019–2021 | São José | 53 | (10) |
- * Club domestic league appearances and goals

Luiz Eduardo Azevedo Dantas (born 24 May 1985) is a Brazilian former professional footballer who played as a forward.

== Career ==
=== Brazil ===
Luiz Eduardo was born in Parelhas. For four years he played for ABC Futebol Clube, Ceará Sporting Club, Santa Cruz Futebol Clube, Social Futebol Clube, Caldense, Volta Redonda and Londrina Esporte Clube.

=== Montana ===
In June 2009, Eduardo relocated to Bulgaria, signing a contract with PFC Montana. On 22 August 2009, he made his A Group debut in a match against Minyor Pernik. Eduardo scored a goal for the first time in Bulgaria on 17 October 2009 against Lokomotiv Plovdiv, netting twice in a 3–2 loss. In January 2010, it was reported in the Bulgaria media that he was a target for Armenian side FC Banants. He left PFC Montana at the end of 2011–12 season when his contract expired.
