= Maicon Talhetti =

Brazilian footballer

Personal information
- Date of birth: 23 February 1990 (age 36)
- Place of birth: Caçador, Brazil
- Height: 1.73 m (5 ft 8 in)
- Position: Midfielder

Youth career
- Figueirense

Senior career*
Years	Team	Apps	(Gls)
2009–2015	Figueirense	2	(1)
2012	→ Brusque (loan)	0	(0)
2013	→ Novo Hamburgo (loan)		
2014	→ ABC (loan)	0	(0)
2016	Tubarão		
2017	Cametá		
2018	Moto Club		
- * Club domestic league appearances and goals as of 11:50, 18 June 2019 (UTC)

Maicon Talhetti (born 23 February 1990) is a Brazilian footballer who most recently played for Moto Club as a midfielder.

== Career ==
Talhetti began playing football with Figueirense FC, winning the Copa São Paulo de Futebol Júnior with the club's youth side. At age 18, Talhetti suffered a serious knee injury playing with the senior side in the Campeonato Catarinense, which required three surgeries and kept him from playing again until 2011. Shortly after he left Figueirense, spending the rest of his career playing with clubs in the Catarinense and Paraense state championships.
