= Estádio Maximino Porpino Filho =

Stadium in Castanhal, Pará, Brazil

- Modelão
- Interactive map of Estádio Maximino Porpino Filho
- Full name: Estádio Maximino Porpino Filho
- Former names: Estádio Jarbas Passarinho
- Location: Castanhal, Pará, Brazil
- Coordinates: 1°17′10″S 47°55′37″W
- Owner: Castanhal City Hall
- Capacity: 5,000
- Surface: Grass
- Record attendance: 4,021 (Castanhal v Paysandu, 16 July 2000)
- Field size: 105 x 68 m

Construction
- Opened: 1947

Tenant
- Castanhal

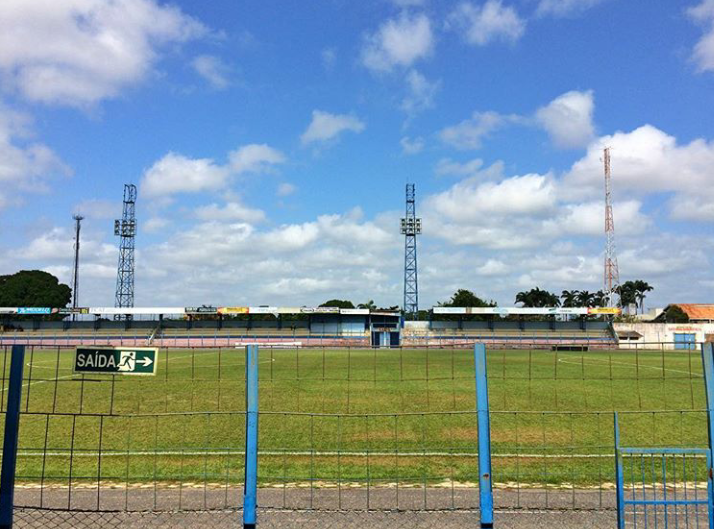

Estádio Maximino Porpino Filho or Modelão, as it is usually called, is a stadium located in Castanhal, Brazil. It is used mostly for football matches and hosts the home matches of Castanhal. The stadium has a maximum capacity of 5,000 people.
