= Gilvan (footballer) =

Brazilian footballer (born 1989)

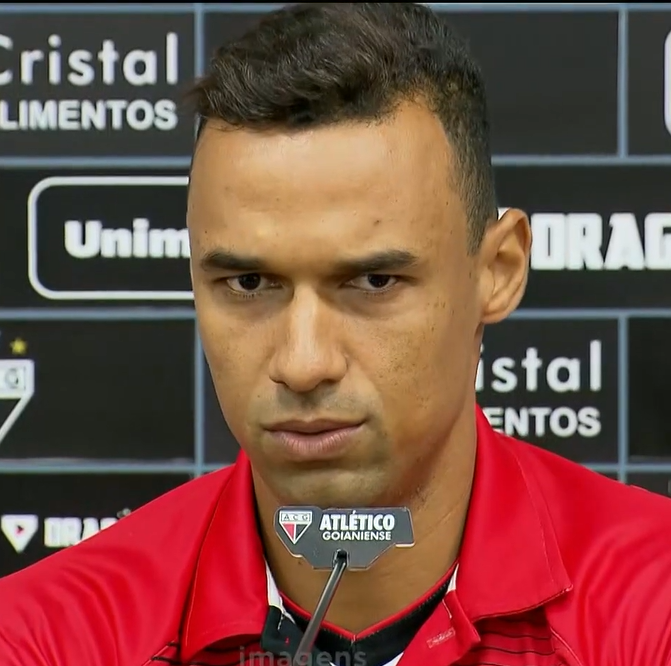
- Gilvan in 2019

Personal information
- Full name: Gilvan Souza Correa
- Date of birth: 10 November 1989 (age 37)
- Place of birth: Salgado, Brazil
- Height: 1.88 m (6 ft 2 in)
- Position: Centre back

Team information
- Current team: América de Natal

Youth career
- 2007–2009: Iraty

Senior career*
Years	Team	Apps	(Gls)
2010–2012	Iraty	26	(0)
2012–2017	Londrina	50	(2)
2014	→ Ponte Preta (loan)	27	(0)
2015	→ Ceará (loan)	41	(1)
2016–2017	→ Paysandu (loan)	61	(7)
2017–2018	Atlético Goianiense	24	(2)
2018	CFR Cluj	0	(0)
2018–2021	Atlético Goianiense	105	(6)
2021	Botafogo	35	(2)
2022–2023	CRB	25	(2)
2023–	América de Natal	7	(1)
- * Club domestic league appearances and goals as of 22 July 2023

Gilvan Souza Correa (born 10 November 1989), simply known as Gilvan, is a Brazilian footballer who plays as a central defender for América de Natal.

== Club career ==
Born in Salgado, Gilvan made his professional debut with fourth tier Iraty Sport Club in 2010, before moving to Londrina Esporte Clube of the same tier two years later. On 19 May 2014, he signed for Associação Atlética Ponte Preta of the second tier on a loan deal.

After having ended the season winning promotion to the first tier, Gilvan chose to stay back in the second, and signed a one-year loan deal with Ceará Sporting Club on 9 January 2015. He made his league debut in May, playing the whole ninety minutes of a 1–0 defeat against Paraná Clube.

On 6 January 2016, Gilvan moved to Paysandu Sport Club on a year long loan deal. He scored a brace for the club on 20 August, in a 2–0 league victory against his former club Ceará. He won the 2016 season of the Copa Verde with the club. On 5 July 2017, he was released by the club due to a clause in his contract - he had to be released if he received any offer from a Série A club. He subsequently signed with Atlético Goianiense. Though the club was relegated at the season, he signed a one-year contract extension in December.

On 13 January 2018, Gilvan moved abroad for the first time and signed a three-year deal with Romanian Liga I club CFR Cluj. He returned to Atlético Goianiense in July 2018 without making an appearance for the Romanian club.

== Honours ==
Botafogo

- Campeonato Brasileiro Série B: 2021

CFR Cluj

- Liga I: 2017–18

Ceará

- Copa do Nordeste: 2015
