= Marcelo Labarthe =

Brazilian footballer

Personal information
- Full name: Marcelo Martini Labarthe
- Date of birth: 12 August 1984 (age 42)
- Place of birth: Porto Alegre, Brazil
- Height: 1.74 m (5 ft 8 1/2 in)
- Position: Midfielder

Youth career
- 1999–2003: Internacional

Senior career*
Years	Team	Apps	(Gls)
2004–2005	Internacional	8	(0)
2005	Sporting	0	(0)
2005–2006	→ Beira Mar (loan)	13	(0)
2006–2007	→ Vitória Setúbal (loan)	9	(0)
2007–2008	→ Grêmio (loan)	7	(0)
2009	Ventforet Kofu	0	(0)
2009–2010	Uberlândia	2	(0)
2010–2011	Caxias	0	(0)
2011	São José-RS	8	(0)
2012–2013	Comercial	3	(0)
2013	Platanias	2	(0)
2014	Aparecidense	14	(0)
2014	Juventus-SC		
2015	Corinthians USA		
2016	Portuguesa	1	(0)
2016	Ypiranga	12	(0)
- * Club domestic league appearances and goals as of 29 May 2016

Marcelo Martini Labarthe (born 12 August 1984 in Porto Alegre), known as Marcelo Labarthe, is a Brazilian footballer who plays as an attacking midfielder.

== Club career ==
Marcelo Labarthe previously played for the rivals Internacional and Grêmio.

He started in the youth categories of Internacional, known only by his first name, Marcelo. Inter's president at the time, Fernando Carvalho, suggested the change to only Labarthe, the surname of his French origins, because it could be more attractive for the European leagues, where the boy could get dual citizenship (in a similar case of his fellows from Inter's youth team, Rafael Sobis and Marcos Camozzato). When he went to the main team, he used his first name along with his last one, Marcelo Labarthe.

== Honours ==
Internacional

- Campeonato Gaúcho: 2004, 2005

Juventus-SC

- Campeonato Catarinense Série C: 2014
