= Iretama =

Coordinates: 24°17′S 52°02′W

- Municipality
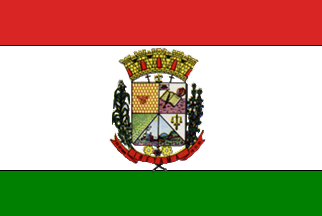
- Flag Coat of arms
- Interactive map of Iretama
- Country: Brazil
- Region: Southern
- State: Paraná
- Mesoregion: Centro Ocidental Paranaense

Population (2020)
  - Total: 10,098
- Time zone: UTC−3 (BRT)

Iretama is a municipality in the state of Paraná in the Southern Region of Brazil.

== See also ==
- List of municipalities in Paraná
