= Danilinho (footballer, born 1985) =

Brazilian footballer

- Danilinho in 2016 with Ypiranga

Personal information
- Full name: Danilo Caçador
- Date of birth: 1 April 1985
- Place of birth: São Paulo, Brazil
- Date of death: 13 February 2018 (aged 32)
- Place of death: Petrolina, Brazil
- Height: 1.78 m (5 ft 10 in)
- Position: Attacking midfielder

Senior career*
Years	Team	Apps	(Gls)
2010	União Barbarense	0	(0)
2011	Atlético Sorocaba	0	(0)
2011	→ Marília (loan)	7	(1)
2012	CRAC	0	(0)
2012	Atlético Goianiense	14	(0)
2013	Figueirense	1	(0)
2013–2014	Chapecoense	13	(2)
2014	XV de Piracicaba	0	(0)
2014	Icasa	11	(1)
2014	Cuiabá	2	(0)
2015	Aparecidense	0	(0)
2015	CSA	0	(0)
2015	Caxias do Sul	4	(0)
2016	Ypiranga	14	(2)
2017	Itumbiara	0	(0)
2017	Remo	5	(0)
2018	Juazeirense	0	(0)
- * Club domestic league appearances and goals as of 31 May 2018

Danilo Caçador (1 April 1985 – 13 February 2018) was a Brazilian footballer who played as an attacking midfielder for Chapecoense.

Danilo died on 13 February 2018 having suffered a heart attack while training with his club Juazeirense.

== See also ==
- List of association footballers who died while playing
