= Josué Teixeira =

Brazilian football manager (born 1960)

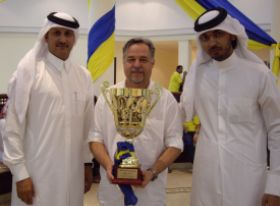

Personal information
- Full name: Josué Amaral Teixeira
- Date of birth: 25 August 1960 (age 66)
- Place of birth: Niterói, Brazil

Team information
- Current team: Tuna Luso (head coach)

Managerial career
- Years: Team
- 2006: Fluminense (caretaker)
- 2007: Avaí
- 2008–2009: Al-Gharafa U23
- 2009: Al-Rayyan U23
- 2009–2011: Nova Iguaçu
- 2011–2012: Sampaio Corrêa
- 2012: Internacional (assistant)
- 2013: Duque de Caxias
- 2013: Flamengo-PI
- 2014: São José-MA
- 2014: Macaé
- 2014: Ríver
- 2014–2015: Macaé
- 2015: ABC
- 2015: Cuiabá
- 2015: Macaé
- 2016: Tricordiano
- 2016: Macaé
- 2017: Remo
- 2017–2018: Macaé
- 2018–2020: Americano
- 2021: America
- 2022: Caeté
- 2022–: Tuna Luso

Josué Amaral Teixeira (born 25 August 1960) is a Brazilian professional football manager who is the head coach of Tuna Luso.

== Managerial career ==
Teixeira was appointed head coach of Macaé in 2014, where he led the team to the title of the Serie C, beating traditional teams like Fortaleza, in a crowded Castelão. the CRB winning the first game 4-0 and Paysandu, while achieving a draw with goals away from home, within the Mangueirão.

== Honours ==
Al-Gharafa

- Qatar Stars League: 2007–08

Sampaio Corrêa

- Campeonato Maranhense: 2011

Ríver

- Campeonato Piauiense: 2014

Macaé

- Campeonato Brasileiro Série C: 2014
