= Wenderson Tsunami =

Brazilian footballer (born 1996)

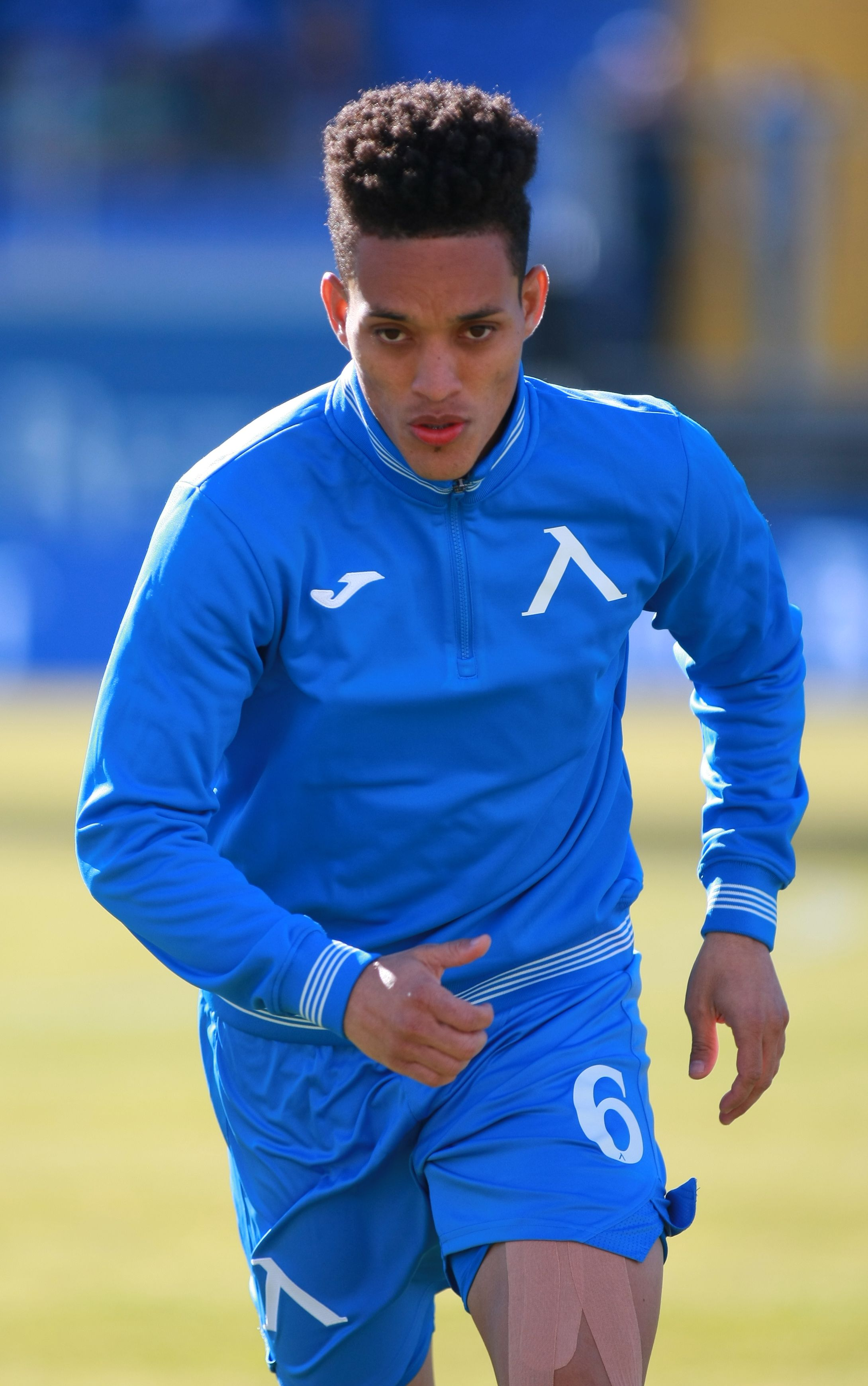
- Tsunami warming up for Levski in 2022

Personal information
- Full name: Wenderson de Freitas Soares
- Date of birth: 4 January 1996 (age 30)
- Place of birth: Belém, Brazil
- Height: 1.89 m (6 ft 2 in)
- Positions: Defender; defensive midfielder

Team information
- Current team: Maccabi Haifa
- Number: 66

Senior career*
Years	Team	Apps	(Gls)
2016–2017	Remo	13	(0)
2016	→ Tapajós (loan)	?	(?)
2016	→ Castanhal (loan)	0	(0)
2018	Rio Claro	0	(0)
2018	Tubarão	2	(0)
2019	Boa Esporte	17	(1)
2019–2020	Cuiabá	0	(0)
2020	Manaus	9	(0)
2021	Botafogo-PB	21	(2)
2022–2026	Levski Sofia	112	(6)
2026	Iğdır	14	(2)
2026–	Maccabi Haifa	6	(1)
- * Club domestic league appearances and goals as of 17 October 2026

Wenderson de Freitas Soares (born 4 January 1996), commonly known as Wenderson Tsunami, is a Brazilian footballer who plays mainly as a left-back for Israeli Premier League club Maccabi Haifa.

== Honours ==
Cuiabá

- Copa Verde: 2019

Levski Sofia

- Bulgarian Cup (1): 2021–22

== Career statistics ==
=== Club ===
As of 14 May 2025

Club	Season	League			State League		Cup		Other		Total	
Club	Season	Division	Apps	Goals	Apps	Goals	Apps	Goals	Apps	Goals	Apps	Goals
Remo	2016	Série C	1	0	0	0	0	0	0	0	1	0
Remo	2017	Série C	12	0	11 (Note: Appearances in the Campeonato Paraense)	2	1 (Note: Appearances in the Copa do Brasil)	0	4 (Note: Appearances in the Copa Verde)	1	28	3
Remo	Total		13	0	11	2	1	0	4	1	29	3
Castanhal (loan)	2016	–			6 (Note: Appearances in the Campeonato Paraense 2nd Division)	1	0	0	0	0	6	1
Rio Claro	2018	–			7 (Note: Appearances in the Campeonato Paulista A2)	0	0	0	0	0	7	0
Tubarão	2018	Série D	2	0	0	0	0	0	0	0	2	0
Boa Esporte	2019	Série C	17	1	11 (Note: Appearances in the Campeonato Mineiro)	3	1	0	0	0	29	4
Cuiabá	2019	Série B	0	0	0	0	0	0	1	0	1	0
Cuiabá	2020	Série B	0	0	0	0	0	0	0	0	0	0
Manaus	2020	Série C	9	0	0	0	0	0	0	0	9	0
Botafogo-PB	2021	Série C	21	2	0	0	0	0	7 (Note: Appearances in the Copa do Nordeste)	0	28	2
Levski Sofia	2021–22	First League	11	1	–	–	4	0	0	0	15	1
Levski Sofia	2022–23	First League	31	1	–	–	3	0	3	1	37	2
Levski Sofia	2023–24	First League	31	4	–	–	1	0	6	0	38	4
Levski Sofia	2024–25	First League	30	0	–	–	2	0	0	0	32	0
Levski Sofia	Total		103	6	0	0	10	0	9	1	122	7
Career total			165	9	35	6	12	0	21	2	233	17
