= Diogo Oliveira (footballer, born 1982) =

Brazilian footballer

Personal information
- Full name: Diogo Ribeiro de Oliveira
- Date of birth: 7 January 1982 (age 44)
- Place of birth: Rio de Janeiro, Brazil
- Height: 1.82 m (5 ft 11 1/2 in)
- Position: Midfielder

Team information
- Current team: Caxias

Senior career*
Years	Team	Apps	(Gls)
2003	São Cristóvão		
2003–2004	Rio Branco		
2005	Uniclinic		
2006	Ceará	1	(0)
2007	Rio Branco–PR		
2008	Cabofriense		
2008	Central		
2008	Potiguar		
2009	Uniclinic		
2009	Ferroviário		
2010	América–RN		
2010	Brusque		
2010–2011	Criciúma	18	(1)
2011	Chapecoense	6	(0)
2012	Veranópolis	16	(2)
2012–2014	Juventude	39	(5)
2013	→ Joinville (loan)	13	(2)
2015–2016	Brasil de Pelotas	88	(9)
2017	Paysandu	41	(4)
2018	São Bento	32	(5)
2019	Brasil de Pelotas	41	(2)
2020–	Caxias	10	(3)
- * Club domestic league appearances and goals as of 12:34, 14 June 2019 (UTC)

Diogo Ribeiro de Oliveira (born 7 January 1982) is a Brazilian footballer who currently plays as midfielder for Caxias.

== Career statistics ==
As of 11 June 2019

Club	Season	League			State League		Cup		Continental		Other		Total	
Club	Season	Division	Apps	Goals	Apps	Goals	Apps	Goals	Apps	Goals	Apps	Goals	Apps	Goals
Criciúma	2010	Série C	11	1	—		—		—		—		11	1
Criciúma	2011	Série B	7	0	8	1	—		—		—		15	1
Criciúma	Subtotal		18	0	8	1	—		—		—		26	2
Chapecoense	2011	Série C	6	0	—		—		—		—		6	0
Veranópolis	2012	Gaúcho	—		16	2	—		—		—		16	2
Juventude	2012	Série D	3	0	—		—		—		—		3	0
Juventude	2013	Série D	10	1	17	4	—		—		—		27	5
Juventude	2014	Série C	10	0	9	0	—		—		—		19	0
Juventude	Subtotal		23	1	26	4	—		—		—		49	5
Joinville	2013	Série B	13	2	—		—		—		—		13	2
Brasil de Pelotas	2015	Série C	21	2	14	4	2	0	—		—		37	6
Brasil de Pelotas	2016	Série B	35	3	14	0	2	0	—		—		51	3
Brasil de Pelotas	Subtotal		56	5	28	4	4	0	—		—		88	9
Paysandu	2017	Série B	20	1	10	1	2	1	—		8 (Note: All appearance(s) in Copa Verde)	2	40	5
São Bento	2018	Série B	26	4	6	1	0	0	—		—		32	5
Brasil de Pelotas	2019	Série B	6	0	7	0	2	0	—		—		15	0
Career total			168	14	101	13	8	1	0	0	8	2	285	30
