= Jhonnatan =

Brazilian footballer

Personal information
- Full name: Jhonnatan Guimarães Saraiva Teixeira
- Date of birth: 18 February 1992 (age 34)
- Place of birth: Belém, Brazil
- Height: 1.74 m (5 ft 9 in)
- Position: Defensive midfielder

Team information
- Current team: Paysandu

Youth career
- –2012: Remo

Senior career*
Years	Team	Apps	(Gls)
2012–2014	Remo	10	(0)
2015	Paysandu	31	(2)
2016	Ceará	0	(0)
2016	→ Paysandu (loan)	30	(6)
2017	Paysandu	17	(0)
2018	Portuguesa-RJ	11	(0)
2018	Náutico	13	(2)
2018	→ CSA (loan)	0	(0)
2019	CSA	1	(0)
2019	→ Náutico (loan)	14	(2)
2020	Náutico	35	(0)
2021–	Paysandu	0	(0)
- * Club domestic league appearances and goals as of 19:41, 24 June 2019 (UTC)

Jhonnatan Guimarães Saraiva Teixeira (born February 18, 1992), simply known as Jhonnatan, is a Brazilian footballer who plays as a defensive midfielder for Paysandu.

== Honours ==
Remo

- Campeonato Paraense: 2014

Paysandu

- Campeonato Paraense: 2017, 2021
