= Ricardo Marques (referee) =

Brazilian football referee

Ricardo Marques Ribeiro
- Born: 18 June 1979 (age 47)

Domestic
| Years | League | Role |

International
| Years | League | Role |
| 2009– | FIFA listed | Referee |

Ricardo Marques Ribeiro (born 18 June 1979) is a Brazilian professional football referee. He has been a full international for FIFA since 2009. He refereed some matches in Copa Libertadores.
