= Pinheirense Esporte Clube =

Pinheirense
- Full name: Pinheirense Esporte Clube
- Nickname: General da Vila (General of the Village)
- Founded: December 8, 1925 (100 years ago)
- Ground: Estádio Abelardo Conduru
- Capacity: 5,000
- Head coach: Júnior Amorim
- League: Campeonato Paraense
- 2017: 10th (relegated)
Home colors	Away colors

Pinheirense Esporte Clube, or Pinheirense, as they are usually called, is a Brazilian football team from Icoaraci, district belonging to the city of Belém in Pará, founded on 8 December 1925.

== Stadium ==
Pinheirense play their home games at Estádio Abelardo Conduru. The stadium has a maximum capacity of 3,500 people.

== Women's team ==
In women's football, Pinheirense stands out as the best team in Pará. They are three titles of the Campeonato Paraense. In addition, the team achieved a fourth place in the Copa do Brasil de Futebol Feminino and a sixth place in the Campeonato Brasileiro de Futebol Feminino.

== Honours ==
=== State ===
- Campeonato Paraense Second Division
  - Winners (1): 2016
- Campeonato Paraense Third Division
  - Winners (1): 2023

=== Women's Football ===
- Campeonato Brasileiro de Futebol Feminino Série A2
  - Winners (1): 2017
- Campeonato Paraense de Futebol Feminino
  - Winners (3): 2009, 2010, 2015
