= Estádio Municipal Colosso do Tapajós =

Football stadium in Santarém, Brazil

Colosso do Tapajós
- Barbalhão
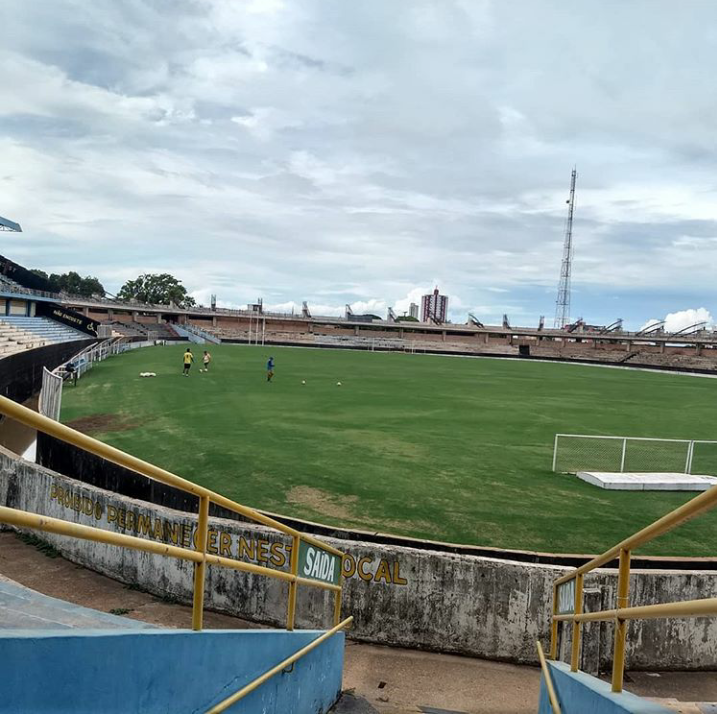
- View of the stadium
- Interactive map of Colosso do Tapajós
- Full name: Estádio Municipal Colosso do Tapajós
- Former names: Estádio Municipal Jader Fontenelle Barbalho
- Location: Santarém, Pará, Brazil
- Coordinates: 2°26′37″S 54°42′52″W
- Owner: Pará State Government; Santarém City Hall
- Capacity: 23,038 (after reinauguration)
- Surface: Grass
- Record attendance: 20,000 (São Raimundo v São Francisco, 11 March 1987)
- Field size: 105 x 72 m

Construction
- Opened: 11 March 1987

Tenants
- São Raimundo; São Francisco; Tapajós; Amazônia Independente

'Estádio Municipal Colosso do Tapajós, commonly known as Colosso do Tapajós, is a football stadium located in Santarém, Brazil. It is the home stadium of São Francisco Futebol Clube and São Raimundo Esporte Clube. It is owned by the Pará State Government and the Santarém City Hall, and it has a maximum capacity of 19,524 people. The stadium is named after the senator Jader Barbalho.

== History ==
The stadium was inaugurated on March 11, 1987, when São Raimundo and São Francisco drew 1–1. The first goal at the stadium was scored by São Francisco's Valdir Almeida. The currently attendance record stands at 20,000 people, set on that day.
