= Edgar (footballer, born 1986) =

Brazilian footballer

Personal information
- Full name: Gladson do Nascimento
- Date of birth: 26 January 1986 (age 40)
- Place of birth: Bacuri, Brazil
- Height: 1.78 m (5 ft 10 in)
- Position: Forward

Senior career*
Years	Team	Apps	(Gls)
2008–2010	Maranhão		
2009	→ Brasil de Pelotas (loan)		
2010	Sampaio Corrêa	9	(5)
2011	Horizonte	1	(0)
2011–?	Sampaio Corrêa	130	(30)
2012	→ Luverdense (loan)		
2017	→ Remo (loan)	18	(5)
- * Club domestic league appearances and goals

Gladson do Nascimento (born 26 January 1986), commonly known as Edgar, is a Brazilian former professional footballer who played as a forward.
