= Carajás Esporte Clube =

Carajás
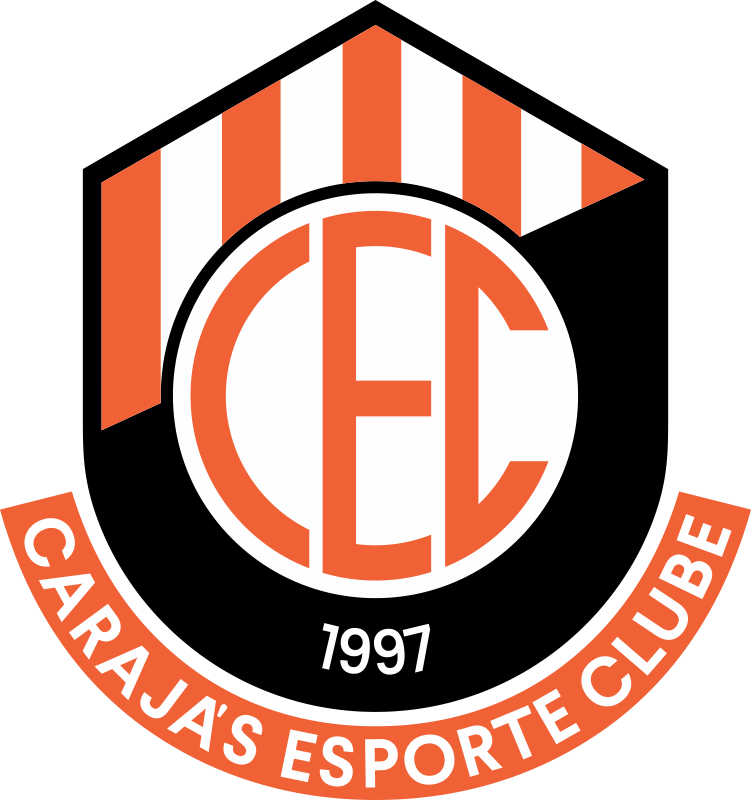
- Full name: Carajás Esporte Clube
- Nickname: Pica-Pau da Ilha (Island Woodpecker)
- Founded: 27 June 1997; 28 years ago
- League: Campeonato Paraense Série B1
- 2024: Paraense Série B1, 4th of 12
- Website: http://carajasclube.com/
Home colors	Away colors

Carajás Esporte Clube, or Carajás, as they are usually called, is a Brazilian football team from Parauapebas in Pará, founded on 27 June 1997.

== History ==
Logo used until 2022

Founded in 1997, Carajás has two titles from the Campeonato Paraense Second Division. In 2007, it signed a partnership with Paysandu, receiving players from the base to gain experience. In exchange, it changed its name to Time Negra Carajás, and its colors happened to be the black and the white. But after years, the team was once again called Carajás and its colors were once again orange, white and black.

== Honours ==
- Campeonato Paraense Second Division
  - Winners (2): 1999, 2013
- Taça ACLEP
  - Winners (3): 2001, 2003, 2004
