= Val Barreto =

Brazilian footballer

Personal information
- Full name: Valdenir Barretos
- Date of birth: 6 February 1986 (age 40)
- Place of birth: Rio Brilhante, Brazil
- Height: 1.88 m (6 ft 2 in)
- Position: Forward

Senior career*
| Years | Team | Apps | (Gls) |
| 2009 | Mirassol | | |
| 2010 | Santa Cruz | | |
| 2010 | Carpinense | | |
| 2012 | Serra | | |
| 2012 | Imperatriz | | |
| 2012 | Ypiranga | | |
| 2013 | Remo | | |
| 2013 | Cuiabá | | |
| 2014–2015 | Remo | | |
| 2015–2016 | Mogi Mirim | | |
| 2016 | Uberlândia | | |
| 2017 | Remo | | |
| 2018 | Castanhal | | |
| 2018 | Moto Club | | |
| 2018 | Jataiense | | |
| 2018 | Patrocinense | | |
| 2019– | Imperatriz | | |
- * Club domestic league appearances and goals

Valdenir Barretos (born 6 February 1986 in Rio Brilhante), commonly known as Val Barreto, is a Brazilian former professional footballer who played as a forward.

== Honours ==
Remo

- Campeonato Paraense: 2014, 2015

Imperatriz

- Campeonato Maranhense: 2019
