= Henrique Moura =

Brazilian footballer (born 1991)

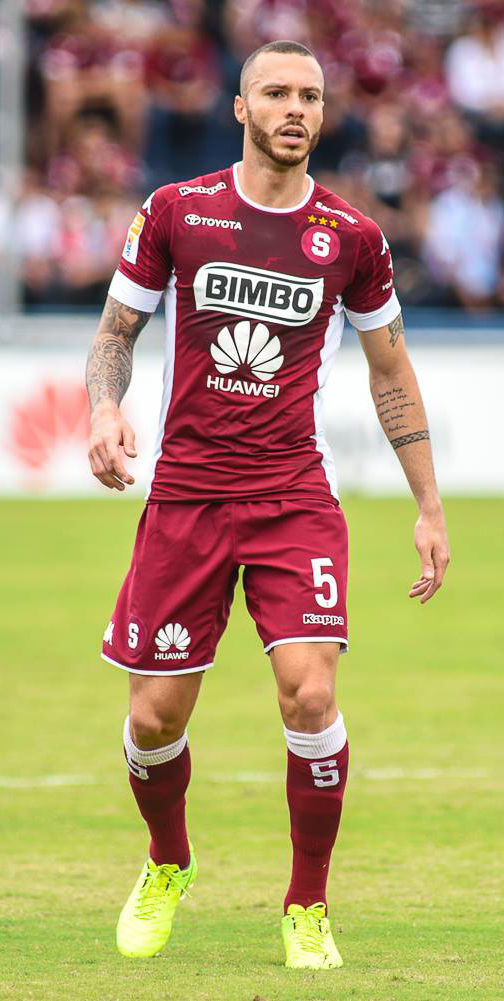
- Henrique in 2017

Personal information
- Full name: Henrique Moura Perillo
- Date of birth: 8 February 1991 (age 35)
- Place of birth: Goiânia, Brazil
- Height: 1.85 m (6 ft 1 in)
- Position: Centre-back

Senior career*
Years	Team	Apps	(Gls)
2011	Vila Nova	42	(2)
2012–2013	Goiás	0	(0)
2013	→ Aparecidense (loan)	3	(0)
2013	→ Grêmio Anápolis (loan)	8	(0)
2015	Parauapebas	2	(0)
2015–2017	Remo	60	(4)
2017–2018	Saprissa	45	(4)
2018–2019	Sabail	16	(1)
2019	GAIS	10	(0)
2020	Boa Esporte	8	(0)
2020–2022	Pérez Zeledón	65	(3)
2022–2023	Sporting San José	4	(0)
- * Club domestic league appearances and goals

Henrique Moura Perillo (born 8 February 1991), or simply Henrique, is a Brazilian former professional footballer who played as centre-back.

== Career ==
On 26 July 2018, Azerbaijan Premier League club Sabail FK announced the signing of Henrique Moura on a one-year contract, with the option of a second year.
