= Gabriel Lima (footballer, born 1996) =

Brazilian footballer

Personal information
- Full name: Gabriel Farias de Lima
- Date of birth: 27 October 1996 (age 30)
- Place of birth: Bonito, Brazil
- Height: 1.71 m (5 ft 7 in)
- Position: Forward

Team information
- Current team: Centro Oeste SAF (on loan from Tombense)

Youth career
- –2016: Remo

Senior career*
Years	Team	Apps	(Gls)
2017–2018	Remo	33	(9)
2018–	Tombense	28	(4)
2018–2019	→ Avaí (loan)	29	(5)
2021	→ Remo (loan)	12	(0)
2021–2022	→ São José (loan)	32	(5)
2023	→ Manaus FC (loan)	13	(0)
2023–	→ Centro Oeste SAF (loan)		
- * Club domestic league appearances and goals as of 26 August 2023

Gabriel Farias de Lima (born 27 October 1996), known as Gabriel Lima, is a Brazilian footballer who plays for Centro Oeste SAF on loan from Tombense as a forward.

== Honours ==
Avaí

- Campeonato Catarinense: 2019
