= Navegantão =

Brazilian stadium

- Interactive map of Navegantão
- Full name: Estádio Municipal Antônio Dias Navegantes
- Location: Tucuruí, Pará, Brazil
- Coordinates: 3°47′11″S 49°40′12″W
- Owner: Tucuruí City Hall
- Capacity: 7,200
- Surface: Grass
- Record attendance: 8,000 (Independente v Parauapebas, 8 March 2015)
- Field size: 105 x 68 m

Construction
- Opened: 1989
- Renovated: 2020

Tenant
- Independente (2009–present)

Estádio Municipal Antônio Dias Navegantes is a stadium located in Tucuruí, Brazil. It is used mostly for football matches and hosts the home matches of Independente Atlético Clube de Tucuruí. The stadium has a maximum capacity of 8,000 people.
