= Independente Atlético Clube de Tucuruí =

Brazilian association football club based in Tucuruí, Pará, Brazil

Independente
- Full name: Independente Atlético Clube de Tucuruí
- Nickname: Galo Elétrico (Electric Cock)
- Founded: 28 November 1972; 53 years ago
- Ground: Navegantão
- Capacity: 7,200
- President: Rosalvo Fernandes
- Head coach: Emerson Almeida
- League: Campeonato Paraense Série A2
- 2025: Paraense, 11th of 12 (relegated)
Home colors	Away colors	Third colors

Independente Atlético Clube de Tucuruí, commonly referred to as Independente, is a Brazilian professional club based in Tucuruí, Pará founded on 28 November 1972. It competes in the Campeonato Paraense A2, the second tier of the Pará state football league.

== History ==
The club was founded on November 28, 1972.

=== Men's team ===
The club won the Campeonato Paraense Second Level in 2009, and the Campeonato Paraense in 2011, after beating Paysandu in the final on a penalty shootout after the score was 3-3. They competed in the Série D in 2011, when they were defeated in the Quarterfinals by Cuiabá 2-0 and 4-2.

=== Women's team ===
They competed in the Copa do Brasil de Futebol Feminino in 2007, when they were eliminated in the First Round by Rio Norte.

== Honours ==
=== State ===
- Campeonato Paraense
  - Winners (1): 2011
  - Runners-up (2): 2015, 2019
- Campeonato Paraense Second Division
  - Winners (2): 2009, 2024
- Taça Cidade de Belém
  - Winners (1): 2015
- Taça Estado do Pará
  - Winners (1): 2011
- Taça ACLEP
  - Winners (1): 2014

=== Women's Football ===
- Campeonato Paraense de Futebol Feminino
  - Winners (6): 1999, 2000, 2001, 2002, 2003, 2007

== Stadium ==
Independente Atlético Clube play their home games at Navegantão. The stadium has a maximum capacity of 8,000 people.
