= São Raimundo Esporte Clube (PA) =

Brazilian association football club based in Santarém, Pará, Brazil

São Raimundo
- Full name: São Raimundo Esporte Clube
- Nicknames: Pantera Negra (Black Panther); Alvinegro Santareno (White and Black from Santarém)
- Founded: 9 January 1944; 82 years ago
- Ground: Estádio Municipal Colosso do Tapajós
- Capacity: 17,846
- President: Júnior Tapajós
- Head coach: Robson Melo
- League: Campeonato Paraense
- 2025: Paraense Série A2, 1st of 12 (champions)
Home colors	Away colors

São Raimundo Esporte Clube, or São Raimundo, as they are usually called, is a Brazilian football team from Santarém in Pará, founded on 9 January 1944.

São Raimundo is currently ranked fourth among Pará teams in CBF's national club ranking, at 120th place overall.

== History ==
On January 3, 1944, a committee formed by David Nathanael Valdomiro Pinto and Gerson Marino went to the house of Odorico Reis de Almeida and invited him to assume the presidency of the club, for which he already showed their sympathy publicly. The invitation was accepted and soon marked the meeting of presentation and possession.

On 6 January, the house of Odorico Almeida himself was the meeting where the new board was chosen and sworn, with Odorico Reis Almeida as President and maintenance of other associates in positions for which they were elected previously. Valdomiro Paz Pinto as Secretary, Gerson Marinho da Silva as Treasurer and David Nathanael Barbosa dos Santos as Director of Sports. After the act of inauguration, the new president immediately decided on the purchase of a book of minutes, as well as the official foundation of São Raimundo, scoring for the following Sunday the solemn event.

Thus on January 9, 1944, Sunday, at a General Meeting held on Joy Street was officially founded the São Raimundo Esporte Clube, with the members of his board first masters: Odorico Reis de Almeida (President), Adamor Bibiano Ribeiro Macedo (First Secretary), Roosevelt de Pinho Gonçalves (Second Secretary), Francisco Carlos Pereira (First Treasurer), Valdomiro Pinto (Deputy Treasurer), and David Natanael Barbosa dos Santos (Director of Sports). Gifts to the electoral event, in addition to the elected board, among others, Ray Jennings, Valdo Marino, Miró, Gerson Marinho, Orlando Cota, Nego Otávio, Valentim, André Pimenta, Água Preta, Osmar Cota, Pé de Chumbo, Domingos Tapioca, Noronha, Dedé, Pingo, Perpétuo and Cassete.

In 2009, the club made history by winning the Campeonato Brasileiro Série D.

== Stadium ==
São Raimundo play their home games at Estádio Municipal Colosso do Tapajós. The stadium has a maximum capacity of 17,846 people.

== Rivalries ==
São Raimundo's biggest rival is São Francisco.

== Honours ==
=== Official tournaments ===
National
Competitions	Titles	Seasons
Campeonato Brasileiro Série D	1	2009
State
Competitions	Titles	Seasons
Campeonato Paraense Second Division	1	2025

=== Others tournaments ===
==== State ====
- Taça Estado do Pará (1): 2009
- Taça ACLEP (1): 2005

=== Runners-up ===
- Campeonato Paraense (1): 2009
- Campeonato Paraense Second Division (2): 1997, 2015
