= São Francisco Futebol Clube (PA) =

Brazilian association football club based in Santarém, Pará, Brazil

São Francisco
- Full name: São Francisco Futebol Clube
- Nicknames: Leão Santareno (Lion from Santarém); Leão do Tapajós (Tapajós' Lion)
- Founded: 30 October 1929; 97 years ago
- Ground: Estádio Municipal Colosso do Tapajós
- Capacity: 17,846
- President: Valdir Matias Júnior
- Head coach: Samuel Cândido
- League: Campeonato Paraense
- 2025: Paraense, 10th of 12
Home colors	Away colors

São Francisco Futebol Clube, or São Francisco, as they are usually called, is a Brazilian football team from Santarém in Pará, founded on 30 October 1929.

São Francisco is currently ranked eighth among Pará teams in CBF's national club ranking, at 216th place overall.

== History ==
In 1920 the two most successful clubs in the western region of Pará were the Santa Cruz and União Esportiva da Congregação Mariana. By its names already indicated if they were associations connected to the religious movement of the Catholic Church, founded by the priest Frei Ambrósio Phillipsenburg, of the order of the smaller brothers. The União Sportiva was an extremely strong team, able to fight against its great and traditional opponent of the time, Santa Cruz.

However, the growth of young athletes associated with União Sportiva motivated a group of local youths to establish a new club in honor of Frei Ambrósio. On 30 October 1929, São Francisco Futebol Clube was founded in Santarém for that purpose. Contemporary accounts described the club's foundation as a significant sporting event in the city, and the newly formed team quickly became one of the prominent football clubs in the region.

After many training in the school camp of the same name, the first game was finally scheduled. It was the first presentation of the already well-assembled and organized football team, which was called: São Francisco Sport Club (first name of the club).

The club's original colors were black and white with horizontal stripes. According to historical accounts, the colors were selected because they were the only ones available in local stores at the time, rather than due to any specific preference.

== Supporters ==
São Francisco is one of the most popular teams in the interior of Pará. In 2010, the club with the biggest crowd in Santarém, created the Socio-Supporter program, its first program of relationship with the supporter. The Sócio-Torcedor Azulino is a fundamental collaborator of the club, and receives more and more exclusive benefits, either through discount or exclusivity.

== Rivalries ==
São Francisco biggest rival is São Raimundo.

== Stadium ==
São Francisco play their home games at Estádio Municipal Colosso do Tapajós. The stadium has a maximum capacity of 17,846 people.

== Honours ==
=== State ===
- Campeonato Paraense
  - Runners-up (1): 2016
- Campeonato Paraense Second Division
  - Winners (1): 1997
- Taça Estado do Pará
  - Winners (1): 2016
- Copa Oeste do Pará
  - Winners (1): 2025

=== City ===
- Campeonato Santareno de Futebol
  - Winners (26): 1950, 1951, 1952, 1953, 1954, 1955, 1956, 1958, 1961, 1962, 1968, 1969, 1970, 1978, 1979, 1981, 1982, 1983, 1984, 1985, 1986, 1987, 1992, 1996, 1998, 2009
