= Castanhal Esporte Clube =

Brazilian association football club based in Castanhal, Pará, Brazil

Castanhal
- Full name: Castanhal Esporte Clube
- Nickname: Japiim da Estrada (Yellow-rumped cacique of the Road)
- Founded: 7 September 1924; 102 years ago
- Ground: Estádio Maximino Porpino Filho
- Capacity: 5,000
- President: Hélio Paes
- Head coach: Emerson Almeida
- League: Campeonato Paraense
- 2025: Paraense, 6th of 12
- Website: http://www.castanhalec.com.br/
Home colors	Away colors

Castanhal Esporte Clube, commonly referred to as Castanhal, is a Brazilian professional football club based in Castanhal, Pará founded on 7 September 1924. It competes in the Campeonato Paraense, the top flight of the Pará state football league.

== History ==
Castanhal Esporte Clube is a Brazilian football club founded in 1924, shortly after the founding of the town of Castanhal. The club was created by group of local sportsmen including Jota Vicente, Orvácio Batista and Lauro Cardoso. Castanhal was professionalized in 1975, withdrew from professional competition in 1978, and returned in 1998. The team is nicknamed Japiim, after a yellow and black bird common in the region. In recent decades, Castanhal has participated in the upper stages of Campeonato Paraense, competing among the state's midsize clubs.

In 2003, the club won the Campeonato Paraense Second Division. In the main division of the championship, his best campaign was in the year 2000 when he lost to Paysandu.

In the national scenario, Castanhal participated twice in the Campeonato Brasileiro Série C. In 2000 he finished 27th out of 36 teams. Four years later he finished in the 33rd position of 60 participants in that edition. In the Copa do Brasil, the club participated only once. It was in 2003, when it was eliminated in the first phase by Ponte Preta.

== Stadium ==
Castanhal play their home games at Estádio Maximino Porpino Filho. The stadium has a maximum capacity of 4,800 people.

== Honours ==
=== Official tournaments ===
State
Competitions	Titles	Seasons
Campeonato Paraense Second Division	1	2003

=== Others tournaments ===
==== State ====
- Taça ACLEP (2): 2006, 2009

=== Runners-up ===
- Campeonato Paraense (1): 2000
- Copa Grão-Pará (1): 2026
