= 2014 Copa do Brasil Second Round =

The 2014 Copa do Brasil Second Round will be played from 22 April to 24 July 2014, to decide the 20 teams advancing to the Third Round. This round took a break for the 2014 FIFA World Cup.

== Second round ==
Team 1	Agg.	Team 2	1st leg	2nd leg
Vasco da Gama (Rio de Janeiro (state))	3–2	(Paraíba) Treze	2–1	1–1
Ponte Preta (São Paulo (state))	2–2 (8–7 p)	(Paraná (state)) Paraná	1–1	1–1
J. Malucelli (Paraná (state))	0–3	(Rio Grande do Sul) Novo Hamburgo	0–1	0–2
Atlético Goianiense (Goiás)	2–3	(Rio Grande do Norte) ABC	1–1	1–2
Santos (São Paulo (state))	6–3	(Amazonas (Brazilian state)) Princesa do Solimões	2–1	4–2
Grêmio Barueri (São Paulo (state))	3–3 (a)	(Paraná (state)) Londrina	0–0	3–3
Palmeiras (São Paulo (state))	4–2	(Maranhão) Sampaio Corrêa	1–2	3–0
Avaí (Santa Catarina (state))	4–4 (a)	(Alagoas) ASA	2–3	2–1
Fluminense (Rio de Janeiro (state))	3–0	(Minas Gerais) Tupi	3–0	–
Náutico (Pernambuco)	2–3	(Rio Grande do Norte) América de Natal	0–3	2–0
Corinthians (São Paulo (state))	3–0	(Amazonas (Brazilian state)) Nacional	3–0	–
Bahia	2–1	(Minas Gerais) América Mineiro	0–0	2–1
Santa Cruz (Pernambuco)	3–2	(Paraíba) Botafogo	1–1	2–1
Potiguar (Rio Grande do Norte)	2–7	(Alagoas) Santa Rita	0–2	2–5
São Paulo (São Paulo (state))	4–2	(Alagoas) CRB	1–2	3–0
Figueirense (Santa Catarina (state))	3–3 (3–4 p)	(São Paulo (state)) Bragantino	1–2	2–1
Coritiba (Paraná (state))	2–0	(Minas Gerais) Caldense	2–0	–
Sport (Pernambuco)	4–4 (a)	(Pará) Paysandu	1–2	3–2
Internacional (Rio Grande do Sul)	5–2	(Mato Grosso) Cuiabá	1–1	4–1
Ceará	3–2	(Santa Catarina (state)) Chapecoense	1–2	1–1

=== Match 41 ===
April 30, 2014
22:00 UTC−03:00

Treze (Paraíba)	1–2	(Rio de Janeiro (state)) Vasco da Gama
Esquerdinha 7'		Thalles 51', 85'

Estádio Governador Ernani Sátyro (Amigão), Campina Grande
Referee: Jailson Macedo Freitas (Bahia)

May 7, 2014
22:00 UTC−03:00

Vasco da Gama (Rio de Janeiro (state))	1–1	(Paraíba) Treze
Douglas Silva 20'		Jailson 24'

Estádio São Januário, Rio de Janeiro
Attendance: 8,623
Referee: Diego Almeida Real (Rio Grande do Sul)

Vasco da Gama won 3–2 on aggregate.

=== Match 42 ===
April 22, 2014
19:30 UTC−03:00

Paraná (Paraná (state))	1–1	(São Paulo (state)) Ponte Preta
Anderson Rosa 67'		Adrianinho 51'

Vila Capanema, Curitiba
Referee: Roger Goulart (Rio Grande do Sul)

May 6, 2014
21:50 UTC−03:00

Ponte Preta (São Paulo (state))	1–1	(Paraná (state)) Paraná
Alexandro 8'		Lúcio Flávio 44'
Penalties
Rodolfo (penalty scored); César (penalty scored); Daniel Borges (penalty scored); Vinicius (penalty scored); Alexandro (penalty scored); Rossi (penalty scored); Juninho (penalty scored); Adilson Goiano (penalty scored)	8–7	(penalty scored) Giancarlo; (penalty scored) Gabriel Barcos; (penalty scored) Lúcio Flávio; (penalty scored) Paulinho; (penalty scored) Keno; (penalty scored) Alisson; (penalty scored) Cambará; (penalty missed) Marcos Serrato

Estádio Moisés Lucarelli, Campinas
Referee: Igor Junio Benevenuto (Minas Gerais)

Tied 2–2 on aggregate, Ponte Preta won on penalties.

=== Match 43 ===
May 1, 2014
16:00 UTC−03:00

Novo Hamburgo (Rio Grande do Sul)	1–0	(Paraná (state)) J. Malucelli
Juba 62'

Estádio do Vale, Novo Hamburgo
Referee: Jefferson Schmidt (Santa Catarina)

May 7, 2014
19:30 UTC−03:00

J. Malucelli (Paraná (state))	0–2	(Rio Grande do Sul) Novo Hamburgo
		Eliomar 13', 73'

Eco-Estádio Janguito Malucelli, Curitiba
Attendance: 568
Referee: Márcio Henrique de Gois (São Paulo)

Novo Hamburgo won 3–0 on aggregate.

=== Match 44 ===
May 7, 2014
20:30 UTC−03:00

ABC (Rio Grande do Norte)	1–1	(Goiás) Atlético Goianiense
Xuxa 61'		Juninho 51'

Frasqueirão, Natal
Referee: Renan Roberto de Souza (Paraíba)

May 14, 2014
20:30 UTC−03:00

Atlético Goianiense (Goiás)	1–2	(Rio Grande do Norte) ABC
Lino 13'		Dênis Marques 63'; João Henrique 84'

Serra Dourada, Goiânia
Referee: Paulo H. Schleich Vollkopf (Mato Grosso do Sul)

ABC won 3–2 on aggregate.

=== Match 45 ===
May 8, 2014
21:50 UTC−03:00

Princesa do Solimões (Amazonas (Brazilian state))	1–2	(São Paulo (state)) Santos
Josinaldo Branco 47'		Gabriel 4'; Alan Santos 9'

Arena da Amazônia, Manaus
Referee: Pablo Ramon Gonçalves Pinheiro (Rio Grande do Norte)

May 15, 2014
21:50 UTC−03:00

Santos (São Paulo (state))	4–2	(Amazonas (Brazilian state)) Princesa do Solimões
Gabriel 18'; Cicinho 25'; Clayton He-Man 55' (o.g.); Thiago Ribeiro 70'		Michell Parintins 38'; Deurick 58'

Estádio Urbano Caldeira (Vila Belmiro), Santos
Referee: Pablo Ramon Gonçalves Pinheiro (Rio Grande do Norte)

Santos won 6–3 on aggregate.

=== Match 46 ===
May 1, 2014
21:50 UTC−03:00

Londrina (Paraná (state))	0–0	(São Paulo (state)) Grêmio Barueri

Estádio do Café, Londrina
Referee: Wanderson Alves de Sousa (Minas Gerais)

May 8, 2014
19:30 UTC−03:00

Grêmio Barueri (São Paulo (state))	3–3	(Paraná (state)) Londrina
Hyantony 14', 44', 68'		Celsinho 7', 31'; Anderson 42'

Arena Barueri, Barueri
Referee: Osimar Moreira da Silva Junior (Goiás)

Tied 3–3 on aggregate, Londrina won on away goals.

=== Match 47 ===
May 7, 2014
22:00 UTC−03:00

Sampaio Corrêa (Maranhão)	2–1	(São Paulo (state)) Palmeiras
Edimar 80'; Edgar 84'		Henrique 66'

Castelão, São Luís
Referee: Pathrice Wallace Corrêa Maia (Rio de Janeiro)

May 14, 2014
22:00 UTC−03:00

Palmeiras (São Paulo (state))	3–0	(Maranhão) Sampaio Corrêa
Mendieta 66'; Henrique 90+1'; Felipe Menezes 90+2'

Estádio Municipal Paulo Machado de Carvalho (Pacaembu), São Paulo
Referee: Marcos André Gomes da Penha (Espírito Santo)

Palmeiras won 4–2 on aggregate.

=== Match 48 ===
May 7, 2014
19:30 UTC−03:00

ASA (Alagoas)	3–2	(Santa Catarina (state)) Avaí
Didira 7', 90' (pen.); Wanderson 23'		Roberto 8'; Marquinhos 36'

Estádio Municipal Coaracy da Mata Fonseca, Arapiraca
Referee: Arilson Bispo da Anunciação (Bahia)

May 13, 2014
20:30 UTC−03:00

Avaí (Santa Catarina (state))	2–1	(Alagoas) ASA
Anderson Lopes 79', 85'		Wanderson 64'

Estádio da Ressacada, Florianópolis
Referee: Wagner dos Santos Rosa (Rio de Janeiro)

Tied 4–4 on aggregate, Avaí won on away goals.

=== Match 49 ===
April 23, 2014
22:00 UTC−03:00

Tupi (Minas Gerais)	0–3	(Rio de Janeiro (state)) Fluminense
		Fred 23', 32'; Wágner 81'

Estádio Municipal Radialista Mário Helênio, Juiz de Fora
Referee: Antônio Rogério Batista do Prado (São Paulo)

Fluminense advanced directly due to winning by 2 or more goals difference.

=== Match 50 ===
May 6, 2014
21:50 UTC−03:00

América de Natal (Rio Grande do Norte)	3–0	(Pernambuco) Náutico
Isac 30'; Max 83', 90+1'

Arena das Dunas, Natal
Referee: Francisco de Assis Almeida Filho (Ceará)

May 13, 2014
19:30 UTC−03:00

Náutico (Pernambuco)	2–0	(Rio Grande do Norte) América de Natal
Flávio 64', 69'

Arena Pernambuco, São Lourenço da Mata
Attendance: 354
Referee: Thiago Duarte Peixoto (São Paulo)

América de Natal won 3–2 on aggregate.

=== Match 51 ===
April 30, 2014
22:00 UTC−03:00

Nacional (Amazonas (Brazilian state))	0–3	(São Paulo (state)) Corinthians
		Cléber 6'; Guerrero 21'; Romarinho 62'

Arena da Amazônia, Manaus
Attendance: 40,189
Referee: Gilberto Rodrigues Castro Junior (Pernambuco)

Corinthians advanced directly due to winning by 2 or more goals difference.

=== Match 52 ===
May 7, 2014
22:00 UTC−03:00

América Mineiro (Minas Gerais)	0–0	Bahia

Estádio Independência, Belo Horizonte
Attendance: 986
Referee: Celio Amorim (Santa Catarina)

May 14, 2014
19:30 UTC−03:00

Bahia	2–1	(Minas Gerais) América Mineiro
Branquinho 31'; Rafinha 88'		Obina 26' (pen.)

Arena Fonte Nova, Salvador
Referee: André Luiz de Freitas Castro (Goiás)

Bahia won 2–1 on aggregate.

=== Match 53 ===
May 14, 2014
22:00 UTC−03:00

Botafogo (Paraíba)	1–1	(Pernambuco) Santa Cruz
Lenílson 21'		Pingo 15'

Almeidão, João Pessoa
Referee: Ranilton Oliveira de Sousa (Maranhão)

July 23, 2014
22:00 UTC−03:00

Santa Cruz (Pernambuco)	2–1	(Paraíba) Botafogo
Léo Gamalho 21', 78'		Lenílson 45'

Estádio do Arruda, Recife
Referee: Jefferson Schmidt (Santa Catarina)

Santa Cruz won 3–2 on aggregate.

=== Match 54 ===
April 24, 2014
15:15 UTC−03:00

Santa Rita (Alagoas)	2–0	(Rio Grande do Norte) Potiguar
Reinaldo 51' (pen.); Marlon 63'

Estádio Olival Elias de Moraes, Boca da Mata
Referee: Johnn Herbert Alves Bispo (Bahia)

May 1, 2014
19:30 UTC−03:00

Potiguar (Rio Grande do Norte)	2–5	(Alagoas) Santa Rita
Paulo Paraíba 8'; Vavá 35' (pen.)		Júnior Amorim 6'; Kenedy 13'; Alexsandro 59'; Rafael Silva 70', 73'

Nogueirão, Mossoró
Referee: José Cleuton Souza Lima (Ceará)

Santa Rita won 7–2 on aggregate.

=== Match 55 ===
April 23, 2014
22:00 UTC−03:00

CRB (Alagoas)	2–1	(São Paulo (state)) São Paulo
Tozin 33' (pen.); Diego Rosa 82'		Ademilson 24'

Estádio Rei Pelé, Maceió
Referee: Pablo Ramon Gonçalves Pinheiro (Rio Grande do Norte)

May 7, 2014
22:00 UTC−03:00

São Paulo (São Paulo (state))	3–0	(Alagoas) CRB
Osvaldo 17'; Lucas Silva 49'; Rogério Ceni 81' (pen.)

Estádio Municipal Paulo Machado de Carvalho (Pacaembu), São Paulo
Attendance: 20,853
Referee: Ronan Marques da Rosa (Santa Catarina)

São Paulo won 4–2 on aggregate.

=== Match 56 ===
May 7, 2014
19:30 UTC−03:00

Bragantino (São Paulo (state))	2–1	(Santa Catarina (state)) Figueirense
Tássio 68' (pen.); Luisinho 71'		Thiago Heleno 49'

Estádio Nabi Abi Chedid, Bragança Paulista
Referee: Anderson Daronco (Rio Grande do Sul)

July 22, 2014
19:30 UTC−03:00

Figueirense (Santa Catarina (state))	2–1	(São Paulo (state)) Bragantino
Jean Carlos 74', 80'		Cesinha 20'
Penalties
Kléber (penalty scored); Marquinhos (penalty scored); Pablo (penalty scored); Clayton (penalty missed); Jean Carlos (penalty missed)	3–4	(penalty scored) Nunes; (penalty scored) Samuel Santos; (penalty scored) Geandro; (penalty missed) Yago; (penalty scored) Luisinho

Estádio Orlando Scarpelli, Florianópolis
Referee: Emerson de Almeida Ferreira (Minas Gerais)

Tied 3–3 on aggregate, Bragantino won on penalties.

=== Match 57 ===
April 30, 2014
19:30 UTC−03:00

Caldense (Minas Gerais)	0–2	(Paraná (state)) Coritiba
		Jajá 1'; Robinho 19'

Ronaldão, Poços de Caldas
Referee: Flavio Rodrigues Guerra (São Paulo)

Coritiba advanced directly due to winning by 2 or more goals difference.

=== Match 58 ===
May 15, 2014
19:30 UTC−03:00

Paysandu (Pará)	2–1	(Pernambuco) Sport
Yago Pikachu 50'; Marcos Paraná 73'		Felipe Azevedo 54'

Estádio Olímpico do Pará (Mangueirão), Belém
Referee: Rodrigo Batista Raposo (Distrito Federal)

July 24, 2014
19:30 UTC−03:00

Sport (Pernambuco)	3–2	(Pará) Paysandu
Ananias 2', 40'; Danilo 14'		Oswaldo 17' (o.g.); Marcos Paraná 42'

Estádio Ilha do Retiro, Recife
Referee: Raphael Claus (São Paulo)

Tied 4–4 on aggregate, Paysandu won on away goals.

=== Match 59 ===
May 1, 2014
19:30 UTC−03:00

Cuiabá (Mato Grosso)	1–1	(Rio Grande do Sul) Internacional
Washington 24'		Rafael Moura 85'

Arena Pantanal, Cuiabá
Attendance: 22,443
Referee: Rodrigo Batista Raposo (Distrito Federal)

May 14, 2014
22:00 UTC−03:00

Internacional (Rio Grande do Sul)	4–1	(Mato Grosso) Cuiabá
Alex 23', 84'; Rafael Moura 53'; Fabricio 88'		Alan 90'

Estádio José Pinheiro Borda (Beira-Rio), Porto Alegre
Referee: Marcelo Aparecido R. de Souza (São Paulo)

Internacional won 5–2 on aggregate.

=== Match 60 ===
May 14, 2014
19:30 UTC−03:00

Chapecoense (Santa Catarina (state))	1–2	Ceará
Tiago Luís 9'		Bill 36', 64'

Arena Condá, Chapecó
Referee: Leandro Bizzio Marinho (São Paulo)

July 23, 2014
19:30 UTC−03:00

Ceará	1–1	(Santa Catarina (state)) Chapecoense
Eduardo 35'		Leandro 45+1'

Estádio Governador Plácido Castelo (Castelão), Fortaleza
Referee: Flavio Rodrigues Guerra (São Paulo)

Ceará won 3–2 on aggregate.
