= 2014 Copa do Brasil First Round =

The 2014 Copa do Brasil First Round was played from 12 March to 7 May 2014, to decide the 40 teams advancing to the Second Round.

== First round ==
Team 1	Agg.	Team 2	1st leg	2nd leg
Vasco da Gama (Rio de Janeiro (state))	1–0	(Rio de Janeiro (state)) Resende	0–0	1–0
Treze (Paraíba)	3–2	(Minas Gerais) Tombense	1–1	2–1
Ponte Preta (São Paulo (state))	4–1	(Roraima) Náutico	4–1	–
Paraná (Paraná (state))	4–2	(São Paulo (state)) São Bernardo	1–1	3–1
Vitória (Bahia)	2–2 (3–5 p)	(Paraná (state)) J. Malucelli	1–1	1–1
Joinville (Santa Catarina (state))	2–3	(Rio Grande do Sul) Novo Hamburgo	0–1	2–2
Atlético Goianiense (Goiás)	3–2	(Piauí) Flamengo	1–0	2–2
ABC (Rio Grande do Norte)	4–2	(Espírito Santo) Desportiva Ferroviária	0–1	4–1
Santos (São Paulo (state))	3–0	(Mato Grosso) Mixto	0–0	3–0
Brasiliense (Federal District (Brazil))	5–5 (a)	(Amazonas (Brazilian state)) Princesa do Solimões	1–3	4–2
Criciúma (Santa Catarina (state))	2–3	(Paraná (state)) Londrina	0–2	2–1
Grêmio Barueri (São Paulo (state))	2–2 (a)	(Goiás) Goianésia	2–2	0–0
Palmeiras (São Paulo (state))	3–0	(Rondônia) Vilhena	1–0	2–0
Sampaio Corrêa (Maranhão)	5–3	(Tocantins) Interporto	2–2	3–1
Avaí (Santa Catarina (state))	4–1	(Mato Grosso do Sul) Naviraiense	4–1	–
ASA (Alagoas)	4–0	(Pará) Paragominas	4–0	–
Fluminense (Rio de Janeiro (state))	6–3	(Ceará) Horizonte	1–3	5–0
Tupi (Minas Gerais)	2–0	(Bahia) Juazeiro	2–0	–
Náutico (Pernambuco)	1–1 (3–1 p)	Sergipe	0–1	1–0
América de Natal (Rio Grande do Norte)	4–1	(Rio de Janeiro (state)) Boavista	2–1	2–0
Corinthians (São Paulo (state))	2–0	Bahia de Feira	2–0	–
Nacional (Amazonas (Brazilian state))	4–3	(Rio Grande do Sul) São Luiz	2–2	2–1
Bahia	3–1	(Minas Gerais) Villa Nova	1–1	2–0
América Mineiro (Minas Gerais)	3–0	(Amapá) Santos	3–0	–
Goiás	0–2	(Paraíba) Botafogo	0–2	0–0
Santa Cruz (Pernambuco)	4–1	(Sergipe) Lagarto	1–0	3–1
Portuguesa (São Paulo (state))	2–2 (a)	(Rio Grande do Norte) Potiguar	0–1	2–1
Guarani (São Paulo (state))	1–2	(Alagoas) Santa Rita	0–0	1–2
São Paulo (São Paulo (state))	4–0	(Alagoas) CSA	1–0	3–0
CRB (Alagoas)	4–2	(Mato Grosso) Rondonópolis	2–2	2–0
Figueirense (Santa Catarina (state))	3–1	(Acre (state)) Plácido de Castro	0–0	3–1
Bragantino (São Paulo (state))	1–0	(Rio Grande do Sul) Lajeadense	0–0	1–0
Coritiba (Paraná (state))	4–2	(Mato Grosso do Sul) CENE	2–2	2–0
Duque de Caxias (Rio de Janeiro (state))	2–4	(Minas Gerais) Caldense	0–2	2–2
Sport (Pernambuco)	3–1	(Federal District (Brazil)) Brasília	3–1	–
Paysandu (Pará)	4–3	Maranhão	2–2	2–1
Internacional (Rio Grande do Sul)	6–1	(Pará) Remo	6–1	–
Cuiabá (Mato Grosso)	2–0	(Ceará) Barbalha	0–0	2–0
Ceará	5–1	(Piauí) Parnahyba	1–0	4–1
Chapecoense (Santa Catarina (state))	2–0	(Acre (state)) Rio Branco	2–0	–

=== Match 1 ===
April 3, 2014
20:30 UTC−03:00

Resende (Rio de Janeiro (state))	0–0	(Rio de Janeiro (state)) Vasco da Gama

Arena da Amazônia, Manaus
Referee: Edmar Campos da Encarnação (Amazonas)

April 16, 2014
22:00 UTC−03:00

Vasco da Gama (Rio de Janeiro (state))	1–0	(Rio de Janeiro (state)) Resende
Douglas 69' (pen.)

Estádio São Januário, Rio de Janeiro
Referee: Rodrigo Carvalhães de Miranda (Rio de Janeiro)

Vasco da Gama won 1–0 on aggregate.

=== Match 2 ===
March 12, 2014
20:30 UTC−03:00

Tombense (Minas Gerais)	1–1	(Paraíba) Treze
Jonathan 20'	Report	Esquerdinha 22'

Estádio Antônio de Almeida, Tombos
Attendance: 716
Referee: Rudimar Goltara (Mato Grosso)

April 9, 2014
20:30 UTC−03:00

Treze (Paraíba)	2–1	(Minas Gerais) Tombense
Hudson 47'; Fabinho Cambalhota 90+2'		Jonathan 13'

Estádio Presidente Vargas, Campina Grande
Referee: Suelson Diorgenes de França Medeiros (Rio Grande do Norte)

Treze won 3–2 on aggregate.

=== Match 3 ===
March 12, 2014
21:30 UTC−03:00

Náutico (Roraima)	1–4	(São Paulo (state)) Ponte Preta
Soldado 23'	Report	Ademir 27'; Thiago Carleto 33'; Rossi 52'; Wilker 74'

Estádio Raimundo Ribeiro, Boa Vista
Attendance: 324
Referee: Joao Batista Cunha de Brito (Amazonas)

Ponte Preta advanced directly due to winning by 2 or more goals difference.

=== Match 4 ===
March 20, 2014
19:30 UTC−03:00

São Bernardo (São Paulo (state))	1–1	(Paraná (state)) Paraná
Marino 45'		Giancarlo 39'

Estádio 1º de Maio, São Bernardo do Campo
Attendance: 7,684
Referee: Flavio Henrique Coutinho Teixeira (Minas Gerais)

April 10, 2014
19:30 UTC−03:00

Paraná (Paraná (state))	3–1	(São Paulo (state)) São Bernardo
Anderson Rosa 39'; Giancarlo 44', 88'		Jean Carlos 80'

Vila Capanema, Curitiba
Referee: Rodrigo D'Alonso Ferreira (Santa Catarina)

Paraná won 4–2 on aggregate.

=== Match 5 ===
March 19, 2014
19:30 UTC−03:00

J. Malucelli (Paraná (state))	1–1	(Bahia) Vitória
Bruno Batata 20' (pen.)		Alan Pinheiro 81'

Eco-Estádio Janguito Malucelli, Curitiba
Attendance: 245
Referee: Bruno Arleu de Araujo (Rio de Janeiro)

April 24, 2014 (Note: Due to Bahia's military police strike, Vitória v J.Malucelli was postponed from April 16th to April 24th as a security precaution.)
19:30 UTC−03:00

Vitória (Bahia)	1–1	(Paraná (state)) J. Malucelli
Juan 86'		Leandro Silva 66'
Penalties
Juan (penalty scored); Dinei (penalty missed); José Welison (penalty scored); Caio (penalty scored)	3–5	(penalty scored) Tomas; (penalty scored) Evandro; (penalty scored) Getterson; (penalty scored) Leandro Silva; (penalty scored) Dedoné

Estádio de Pituaçu, Salvador
Referee: Italo Medeiros de Azevedo (Rio Grande do Norte)

Tied 2–2 on aggregate, J. Malucelli won on penalties.

=== Match 6 ===
April 9, 2014
20:30 UTC−03:00

Novo Hamburgo (Rio Grande do Sul)	1–0	(Santa Catarina (state)) Joinville
Douglas 72' (pen.)

Estádio do Vale, Novo Hamburgo
Referee: Leandro Newley Ferreira Belota (Rio de Janeiro)

April 22, 2014
19:30 UTC−03:00

Joinville (Santa Catarina (state))	2–2	(Rio Grande do Sul) Novo Hamburgo
Jael 56', 90+2' (pen.)		Júlio Santos 1'; Eliomar 86'

Arena Joinville, Joinville
Referee: Rodrigo Guarizo F. do Amaral (São Paulo)

Novo Hamburgo won 3–2 on aggregate.

=== Match 7 ===
March 12, 2014
20:30 UTC−03:00

Flamengo (Piauí)	0–1	(Goiás) Atlético Goianiense
	Report	Júnior Viçosa 78'

Estádio Tibério Nunes, Floriano (Note: Flamengo played their home match in the first round at a neutral venue, due to a suspension imposed by the STJD regarding issues in their home match against Santos at the 2013 Copa do Brasil)
Referee: Paulo Sergio Santos (Maranhão)

April 9, 2014
20:30 UTC−03:00

Atlético Goianiense (Goiás)	2–2	(Piauí) Flamengo
Júnior Viçosa 61', 65'		Zuza 19'; Tuta 87'

Serra Dourada, Goiânia
Attendance: 497
Referee: Rafael Martins Diniz (Distrito Federal)

Atlético Goianiense won 3–2 on aggregate.

=== Match 8 ===
March 12, 2014
20:30 UTC−03:00

Desportiva Ferroviária (Espírito Santo)	1–0	(Rio Grande do Norte) ABC
Tatá 13'	Report

Estádio Engenheiro Alencar Araripe, Cariacica
Attendance: 1,078
Referee: Manoel Nunes Lopo (Bahia)

April 2, 2014
20:30 UTC−03:00

ABC (Rio Grande do Norte)	4–1	(Espírito Santo) Desportiva Ferroviária
Daniel Paulista 19', 90+2'; Beto 22'; Somália 41'		Bombom 33'

Frasqueirão, Natal
Referee: Emerson Luiz Sobral (Pernambuco)

ABC won 4–2 on aggregate.

=== Match 9 ===
April 2, 2014
22:00 UTC−03:00

Mixto (Mato Grosso)	0–0	(São Paulo (state)) Santos

Arena Pantanal, Cuiabá
Referee: Eduardo Tomaz de Aquino Valadão (Goiás)

April 16, 2014
22:00 UTC−03:00

Santos (São Paulo (state))	3–0	(Mato Grosso) Mixto
Arouca 59'; Gabriel 69' (pen.), 83'

Estádio Urbano Caldeira (Vila Belmiro), Santos
Referee: Bráulio da Silva Machado (Mato Grosso do Sul)

Santos won 3–0 on aggregate.

=== Match 10 ===
April 16, 2014
21:30 UTC−03:00

Princesa do Solimões (Amazonas (Brazilian state))	3–1	(Federal District (Brazil)) Brasiliense
Michell Parintins 20'; Branco 40'; Nando 70'		Luiz Carlos 66'

Estádio Roberto Simonsen (SESI), Manaus
Attendance: 1,280
Referee: Dewson Fernando Freitas da Silva (Pará)

April 23, 2014
20:30 UTC−03:00

Brasiliense (Federal District (Brazil))	4–2	(Amazonas (Brazilian state)) Princesa do Solimões
Luiz Carlos 9', 58', 86'; Zé Roberto 68'		Nando 33'; Canutãma 79'

Estádio Elmo Serejo Farias (Serejão), Taguatinga
Referee: Bruno Rezende Silva (Goiás)

Tied 5–5 on aggregate, Princesa do Solimões won on away goals.

=== Match 11 ===
March 19, 2014
19:30 UTC−03:00

Londrina (Paraná (state))	2–0	(Santa Catarina (state)) Criciúma
Arthur 22', 30'

Estádio do Café, Londrina
Referee: Marcelo Alves dos Santos (Mato Grosso)

April 10, 2014
19:30 UTC−03:00

Criciúma (Santa Catarina (state))	2–1	(Paraná (state)) Londrina
Silvinho 31'; Douglas Grolli 88' (o.g.)		Maicon Silva 90+3'

Estádio Heriberto Hülse, Criciúma
Referee: Francisco de Paula dos Santos Silva Neto (Rio Grande do Sul)

Londrina won 3–2 on aggregate.

=== Match 12 ===
March 12, 2014
20:30 UTC−03:00

Goianésia (Goiás)	2–2	(São Paulo (state)) Grêmio Barueri
André Beleza 29'; Nonato 88' (pen.)	Report	Alex Maranhão 54'; Iago 81'

Estádio Valdeir de Oliveira, Goianésia
Attendance: 1,133
Referee: Wales Martins de Souza (Distrito Federal)

April 9, 2014
20:30 UTC−03:00

Grêmio Barueri (São Paulo (state))	0–0	(Goiás) Goianésia

Arena Barueri, Barueri
Referee: Philip Georg Bennett (Rio de Janeiro)

Tied 2–2 on aggregate, Grêmio Barueri won on away goals.

=== Match 13 ===
March 12, 2014
19:30 UTC−03:00

Vilhena (Rondônia)	0–1	(São Paulo (state)) Palmeiras
	Report	Leandro 87'

Estádio Portal da Amazônia, Vilhena
Attendance: 5,618
Referee: Paulo Schleich Vollkopf (Mato Grosso do Sul)

April 2, 2014
22:00 UTC−03:00

Palmeiras (São Paulo (state))	2–0	(Rondônia) Vilhena
Bruno César 72', 77' (pen.)

Estádio Municipal Paulo Machado de Carvalho (Pacaembu), São Paulo
Referee: Wanderson Alves de Sousa (Minas Gerais)

Palmeiras won 3–0 on aggregate.

=== Match 14 ===
March 12, 2014
20:30 UTC−03:00

Interporto (Tocantins)	2–2	(Maranhão) Sampaio Corrêa
Marcos Paullo 40'; Lourival 44' (pen.)	Report	Cleitinho 31', 45+1'

Estádio General Sampaio, Porto Nacional
Attendance: 932
Referee: Rogério Jose Bueno (Distrito Federal)

April 9, 2014
20:30 UTC−03:00

Sampaio Corrêa (Maranhão)	3–1	(Tocantins) Interporto
Edgar 42', 90+1'; David Batista 48'		Fábio Bala 87' (pen.)

Castelão, São Luís
Referee: Luiz César Oliveira Magalhães (Ceará)

Sampaio Corrêa won 5–3 on aggregate.

=== Match 15 ===
April 2, 2014
21:50 UTC−03:00

Naviraiense (Mato Grosso do Sul)	1–4	(Santa Catarina (state)) Avaí
Elsinho 83'		Cléber Santana 2'; Marquinhos 28'; Diego Jardel 75'; Héber 90'

Virotão, Naviraí
Referee: Alinor Silva da Paixão (Mato Grosso)

Avaí advanced directly due to winning by 2 or more goals difference.

=== Match 16 ===
April 3, 2014
19:00 UTC−03:00

Paragominas (Pará)	0–4	(Alagoas) ASA
		Cristiano Gaúcho 10'; Ramazotti 63'; Wanderson 67'; Augusto 82'

Arena Verde, Paragominas
Referee: Carlos Ronne Casas de Paiva (Acre)

ASA advanced directly due to winning by 2 or more goals difference.

=== Match 17 ===
March 20, 2014
21:50 UTC−03:00

Horizonte (Ceará)	3–1	(Rio de Janeiro (state)) Fluminense
Dico 12'; Marciel 62'; Jajá 90'		Conca 15'

Domingão, Horizonte
Referee: Caio Max Augusto Vieira (Rio Grande do Norte)

April 10, 2014
19:30 UTC−03:00

Fluminense (Rio de Janeiro (state))	5–0	(Ceará) Horizonte
Conca 12'; Gum 45'; Rafael Sóbis 45+2'; Wágner 59'; Fred 89'

Estádio Jornalista Mário Filho (Maracanã), Rio de Janeiro
Referee: Anderson Daronco (Rio Grande do Sul)

Fluminense won 6–3 on aggregate.

=== Match 18 ===
March 12, 2014
20:30 UTC−03:00

Juazeiro (Bahia)	0–2	(Minas Gerais) Tupi
	Report	Wesley 21'; Raphael Toledo 75'

Estádio Adauto Morais, Juazeiro
Attendance: 318
Referee: Flavio Feijo de Omena (Alagoas)

Tupi advanced directly due to winning by 2 or more goals difference.

=== Match 19 ===
March 12, 2014
20:30 UTC−03:00

Sergipe	1–0	(Pernambuco) Náutico
Rafael 27'	Report

Estádio Presidente Médici, Itabaiana
Attendance: 1,045
Referee: Marielson Alves Silva (Bahia)

April 9, 2014
19:30 UTC−03:00

Náutico (Pernambuco)	1–0	Sergipe
Marcelinho 79'
Penalties
Elicarlos (penalty scored); Zé Mário (penalty scored); Marcelinho (penalty scored)	3–1	(penalty scored) Raphinha; (penalty missed) Fernando Belém; (penalty missed) João Paulo; (penalty missed) Lelo

Arena Pernambuco, São Lourenço da Mata
Attendance: 1,497
Referee: Charles Hebert Cavalcante Ferreira (Alagoas)

Tied 1–1 on aggregate, Náutico won on penalties.

=== Match 20 ===
April 2, 2014
16:00 UTC−03:00

Boavista (Rio de Janeiro (state))	1–2	(Rio Grande do Norte) América de Natal
Gustavo Geladeira 52' (pen.)		Rodrigo Pimpão 29'; Arthur Maia 35'

Estádio Eucy de Resende, Saquarema
Referee: Devarly Lira do Rosário (Espírito Santo)

April 23, 2014
19:30 UTC−03:00

América de Natal (Rio Grande do Norte)	2–0	(Rio de Janeiro (state)) Boavista
Thiago Cristian 57'; Isac 90'

Arena das Dunas, Natal
Referee: Nielson Nogueira Dias (Pernambuco)

América de Natal won 4–1 on aggregate.

=== Match 21 ===
March 19, 2014
22:00 UTC−03:00

Bahia de Feira	0–2	(São Paulo (state)) Corinthians
		Luciano 31', 89'

Estádio Joia da Princesa, Feira de Santana
Referee: Grazianni Maciel Rocha (Rio de Janeiro)

Corinthians advanced directly due to winning by 2 or more goals difference.

=== Match 22 ===
March 12, 2014
20:30 UTC−03:00

São Luiz (Rio Grande do Sul)	2–2	(Amazonas (Brazilian state)) Nacional
Adilson Bahia 59'; João Paulo 81'	Report	Nando 58'; Leo Paraíba 65'

Estádio 19 de Outubro, Ijuí
Attendance: 692
Referee: Edmundo Alves do Nascimeno (Santa Catarina)

April 9, 2014
21:30 UTC−03:00

Nacional (Amazonas (Brazilian state))	2–1	(Rio Grande do Sul) São Luiz
Chapinha 5', 67'		Adilson Bahia 90+1'

Arena da Amazônia, Manaus
Referee: Fledes Rodrigues Santos (Rondônia)

Nacional won 4–3 on aggregate.

=== Match 23 ===
March 19, 2014
22:00 UTC−03:00

Villa Nova (Minas Gerais)	1–1	Bahia
Mancini 3'		Rafinha 75'

Estádio Castor Cifuentes, Nova Lima
Referee: Raphael Claus (São Paulo)

April 30, 2014 (Note: Due to Bahia's military police strike, Bahia v Villa Nova was postponed from April 17 to April 30 as a security precaution.)
21:00 UTC−03:00

Bahia	2–0	(Minas Gerais) Villa Nova
Henrique 62'; Maxi Biancucchi 73' (pen.)

Arena Fonte Nova, Salvador
Referee: Sebastião Rufino Ribeiro Filho (Pernambuco)

Bahia won 3–1 on aggregate.

=== Match 24 ===
April 2, 2014
20:30 UTC−03:00

Santos (Amapá)	0–3	(Minas Gerais) América Mineiro
		Elvis 6'; Elsinho 45'; Júnior Negão 90+2'

Zerão, Macapá
Referee: Andrey da Silva e Silva (Pará)

América Mineiro advanced directly due to winning by 2 or more goals difference.

=== Match 25 ===
April 2, 2014
19:30 UTC−03:00

Botafogo (Paraíba)	2–0	Goiás
Frontini 5', 31'

Almeidão, João Pessoa
Referee: Avelar Rodrigo da Silva (Ceará)

April 16, 2014
22:00 UTC−03:00

Goiás	0–0	(Paraíba) Botafogo

Estádio Serra Dourada, Goiânia
Referee: Ronan Marques da Rosa (Santa Catarina)

Botafogo won 2–0 on aggregate.

=== Match 26 ===
April 9, 2014
20:30 UTC−03:00

Lagarto (Sergipe)	0–1	(Pernambuco) Santa Cruz
		Carlos Alberto 10'

Estádio Presidente Médici, Itabaiana
Referee: José Reinaldo Figueiredo da Silva Filho (Alagoas)

May 7, 2014
22:00 UTC−03:00

Santa Cruz (Pernambuco)	3–1	(Sergipe) Lagarto
Flávio Caça-Rato 45'; Léo Gamalho 75'; Everton Sena 87'		Jussimar 71'

Estádio dos Aflitos, Recife (Note: Santa Cruz played their home match in the first round at a neutral venue and behind closed doors due to the death of a fan during a home match against Paraná at 2014 Campeonato Brasileiro Série B and a subsequent suspension imposed by the STJD.)
Attendance: 0
Referee: Avelar Rodrigo da Silva (Ceará)

Santa Cruz won 4–1 on aggregate.

=== Match 27 ===
April 2, 2014
19:30 UTC−03:00

Potiguar (Rio Grande do Norte)	1–0	(São Paulo (state)) Portuguesa
Reginaldo Júnior 10'

Nogueirão, Mossoró
Referee: Gilberto Rodrigues Castro Junior (Pernambuco)

April 9, 2014
19:30 UTC−03:00

Portuguesa (São Paulo (state))	2–1	(Rio Grande do Norte) Potiguar
Laércio 34'; Vander 64'		Reginaldo Junior 25'

Estádio do Canindé, São Paulo
Referee: João Batista de Arruda (Rio de Janeiro)

Tied 2–2 on aggregate, Potiguar won on away goals.

=== Match 28 ===
April 2, 2014
15:15 UTC−03:00

Santa Rita (Alagoas)	0–0	(São Paulo (state)) Guarani

Estádio Olival Elias de Moraes, Boca da Mata
Referee: Gilberto Freire de Farias (Pernambuco)

April 9, 2014
15:00 UTC−03:00

Guarani (São Paulo (state))	1–2	(Alagoas) Santa Rita
Medina 81'		Aderlan 2'; Kiros 7'

Estádio Luís Perissinotto, Paulínia
Referee: Leandro Junior Hermes (Paraná)

Santa Rita won 2–1 on aggregate.

=== Match 29 ===
March 12, 2014
22:00 UTC−03:00

CSA (Alagoas)	0–1	(São Paulo (state)) São Paulo
	Report	Osvaldo 54'

Estádio Rei Pelé, Maceió
Attendance: 15,000
Referee: Renan Roberto de Souza (Paraíba)

April 9, 2014
22:00 UTC−03:00

São Paulo (São Paulo (state))	3–0	(Alagoas) CSA
Alexandre Pato 20'; Luís Fabiano 77', 82'

Estádio Cícero Pompeu de Toledo (Morumbi), São Paulo
Referee: Diego Almeida Real (Rio Grande do Sul)

São Paulo won 4–0 on aggregate.

=== Match 30 ===
March 13, 2014
21:30 UTC−03:00

Rondonópolis (Mato Grosso)	2–2	(Alagoas) CRB
Andrezinho 42'; Kaique 64'	Report	Gabriel 18'; Tozin 28' (pen.)

Estádio Luthero Lopes, Rondonópolis
Attendance: 373
Referee: Thiago de Alencar Gonzaga (Mato Grosso do Sul)

April 9, 2014
20:30 UTC−03:00

CRB (Alagoas)	2–0	(Mato Grosso) Rondonópolis
Tozin 6' (pen.); Denílson 80'

Estádio Rei Pelé, Maceió
Referee: Claudionor dos Santos Junior (Sergipe)

CRB won 4–2 on aggregate.

=== Match 31 ===
April 2, 2014
21:30 UTC−03:00

Plácido de Castro (Acre (state))	0–0	(Santa Catarina (state)) Figueirense

Arena da Floresta, Rio Branco
Referee: Arnildo Lino dos Santos (Rondônia)

April 9, 2014
20:30 UTC−03:00

Figueirense (Santa Catarina (state))	3–1	(Acre (state)) Plácido de Castro
Éverton Santos 73', 87'; Giovanni Augusto 90+3' (pen.)		Douglas 43'

Estádio Orlando Scarpelli, Florianópolis
Referee: Paulo Roberto Alves Junior (Paraná)

Figueirense won 3–1 on aggregate.

=== Match 32 ===
April 2, 2014
20:30 UTC−03:00

Lajeadense (Rio Grande do Sul)	0–0	(São Paulo (state)) Bragantino

Arena Alvi-Azul, Lajeado
Referee: Fabio Filipus (Paraná)

April 9, 2014
20:30 UTC−03:00

Bragantino (São Paulo (state))	1–0	(Rio Grande do Sul) Lajeadense
André Astorga 32'

Estádio Nabi Abi Chedid, Bragança Paulista
Referee: Cleisson Veloso Pereira (Minas Gerais)

Bragantino won 1–0 on aggregate.

=== Match 33 ===
March 13, 2014
21:50 UTC−03:00

CENE (Mato Grosso do Sul)	2–2	(Paraná (state)) Coritiba
Eduardo 30'; Edmílson 74'	Report	Roni 37'; Júlio César 50'

Morenão, Campo Grande
Attendance: 723
Referee: Vinicius Furlan (São Paulo)

April 16, 2014
19:30 UTC−03:00

Coritiba (Paraná (state))	2–0	(Mato Grosso do Sul) CENE
Júlio César 65'; Carlinhos 73'

Estádio Couto Pereira, Curitiba
Referee: Thiago Duarte Peixoto (São Paulo)

Coritiba won 4–2 on aggregate.

=== Match 34 ===
April 2, 2014
20:30 UTC−03:00

Caldense (Minas Gerais)	2–0	(Rio de Janeiro (state)) Duque de Caxias
Luiz Eduardo 29', 82' (pen.)

Ronaldão, Poços de Caldas
Referee: Roberto Giovanny Oliveira Silva (Goiás)

April 16, 2014
20:30 UTC−03:00

Duque de Caxias (Rio de Janeiro (state))	2–2	(Minas Gerais) Caldense
Emerson 21'; Rafinha 90' (pen.)		Luiz Eduardo 36'; Rafael Estevam 73'

Estádio de Los Larios, Duque de Caxias
Referee: Dyorgines José Padovani de Andrade (Espírito Santo)

Caldense won 4–2 on aggregate.

=== Match 35 ===
May 1, 2014
21:50 UTC−03:00

Brasília (Federal District (Brazil))	1–3	(Pernambuco) Sport
Kaká 80'		Leonardo 34' (pen.); Augusto 39'; Ananias 59'

Estádio Nacional Mané Garrincha, Brasília
Referee: Janio Pires Gonçalves (Tocantins)

Sport advanced directly due to winning by 2 or more goals difference.

=== Match 36 ===
April 2, 2014
20:30 UTC−03:00

Maranhão	2–2	(Pará) Paysandu
Elton 23'; André Luís 85'		Jô 49'; Lima 58'

Estádio Nhozinho Santos, São Luís
Referee: Antônio Santos Nunes (Piauí)

April 16, 2014
20:30 UTC−03:00

Paysandu (Pará)	2–1	Maranhão
Lima 37'; Leandro Carvalho 72'		Elton 8'

Estádio Olímpico do Pará (Mangueirão), Belém
Referee: Arnoldo Vasconcelos Figarela (Rondônia)

Paysandu won 4–3 on aggregate.

=== Match 37 ===
March 12, 2014
22:00 UTC−03:00

Remo (Pará)	1–6	(Rio Grande do Sul) Internacional
Val Barreto 80'	Report	Fabricio 19'; Rafael Moura 42', 85'; Max 51' (o.g.); Aránguiz 68' (pen.); Alex 72'

Estádio Olímpico do Pará (Mangueirão), Belém
Attendance: 6,474
Referee: Antonio Dib Moraes de Sousa (Piauí)

Internacional advanced directly due to winning by 2 or more goals difference.

=== Match 38 ===
April 2, 2014
20:30 UTC−03:00

Barbalha (Ceará)	0–0	(Mato Grosso) Cuiabá

Estádio Antônio Lírio Callou, Barbalha
Referee: Emanuel Diniz de Araujo (Paraíba)

April 16, 2014
21:30 UTC−03:00

Cuiabá (Mato Grosso)	2–0	(Ceará) Barbalha
Tiago Chulapa 47'; Alan Popó 90'

Estádio Presidente Eurico Gaspar Dutra (Dutrinha), Cuiabá
Referee: Cléber Vaz da Silva (Goiás)

Cuiabá won 2–0 on aggregate.

=== Match 39 ===
April 30, 2014
22:00 UTC−03:00

Parnahyba (Piauí)	0–1	Ceará
		Nikão 1'

Estádio Dirceu Arcoverde, Parnaíba
Referee: Mayron F. dos Reis Novais (Maranhão)

May 7, 2014
20:30 UTC−03:00

Ceará	4–1	(Piauí) Parnahyba
Vicente 5'; Nikão 10'; Magno Alves 58'; Wesley 66' (o.g.)		da Silva 79'

Estádio Governador Plácido Castelo (Castelão), Fortaleza
Referee: Antonio Neuriclaudio R. Costa (Acre)

Ceará won 5–1 on aggregate.

=== Match 40 ===
April 8, 2014
21:30 UTC−03:00

Rio Branco (Acre (state))	0–2	(Santa Catarina (state)) Chapecoense
		Roni 47'; Rafael Lima 76'

Arena da Floresta, Rio Branco
Referee: Valdicleuson Silva da Costa (Amapá)

Chapecoense advanced directly due to winning by 2 or more goals difference.
