= Jair (footballer, born 26 August 1994) =

Brazilian footballer

Personal information
- Full name: Jair Rodrigues Júnior
- Date of birth: 26 August 1994 (age 32)
- Place of birth: Ibirubá, Brazil
- Height: 1.78 m (5 ft 10 in)
- Position: Centre midfielder

Team information
- Current team: Vasco da Gama
- Number: 8

Youth career
- Internacional

Senior career*
Years	Team	Apps	(Gls)
2012–2017	Internacional	8	(0)
2017	→ Rio Verde (loan)	2	(0)
2017	Boa Esporte	1	(0)
2018	Veranópolis	12	(0)
2018	Juventude	18	(0)
2018	Sport Recife	13	(2)
2019–2022	Atlético Mineiro	129	(12)
2023–	Vasco da Gama	66	(4)
- * Club domestic league appearances and goals as of 13 December 2025

Jair Rodrigues Júnior (born 26 August 1994), known simply as Jair, is a Brazilian footballer who plays as a centre midfielder for Vasco da Gama.

== Career ==
Born in Ibirubá, Rio Grande do Sul, Jair began his career at Sport Club Internacional. He was first included in a senior matchday squad on 14 September 2012, remaining an unused substitute in a 1–1 draw at Botafogo de Futebol e Regatas in that year's Campeonato Brasileiro Série A.

On 21 May 2014, he made his debut by replacing Alex after 50 minutes of an eventual 1–1 draw at Coritiba Foot Ball Club. He made his first start on 14 August in the third round second leg of the year's Copa do Brasil, playing the first 33 minutes of a 3–1 loss at Ceará Sporting Club (5–2 aggregate). He played his first Campeonato Gaúcho game on 14 February 2016, featuring for the entirety of a 1–1 draw at Clube Esportivo Aimoré.

Jair left Internacional in 2017 and had a series of spells at Rio Verde, Boa Esporte, Veranópolis and Juventude, before joining Sport Recife on 29 August 2018. He made 13 appearances in the 2018 Série A season, scoring twice in a 4–3 away win over Grêmio.

On 3 January 2019, Jair joined Atlético Mineiro on a four-year deal.

On 10 January 2023, Jair joined Vasco da Gama for a transfer fee of $2.5 million on a permanent deal from Atlético Mineiro.

== Career statistics ==
As of 14 November 2022.

Club	Season	League			Cup		Continental		Other		Total	
Club	Season	Division	Apps	Goals	Apps	Goals	Apps	Goals	Apps	Goals	Apps	Goals
Internacional	2014	Série A	1	0	1	0	0	0	0	0	2	0
Internacional	2016	Série A	2	0	0	0	0	0	5 (Note: Appearances in Campeonato Gaúcho)	0	7	0
Internacional	Total		3	0	1	0	0	0	5	0	9	0
Rio Verde (loan)	2017	—	—		—		—		2 (Note: Appearances in Campeonato Goiano)	0	2	0
Boa Esporte	2017	Série B	1	0	0	0	—		0	0	1	0
Veranópolis	2018	—	—		—		—		12	0	12	0
Juventude	2018	Série B	18	0	0	0	—		0	0	18	0
Sport	2018	Série A	13	2	0	0	—		0	0	13	2
Atlético Mineiro	2019	Série A	13	2	2	0	12 (Note: Six appearances in Copa Libertadores, six appearances and one goal in Copa Sudamericana)	1	7 (Note: Appearances in Campeonato Mineiro)	1	34	4
Atlético Mineiro	2020	Série A	28	4	2	0	2 (Note: Appearances in Copa Sudamericana)	0	11	2	43	6
Atlético Mineiro	2021	Série A	28	2	8	0	7 (Note: Appearances in Copa Libertadores)	0	3	0	46	2
Atlético Mineiro	2022	Série A	31	1	1	0	7	0	9 (Note: Eight appearances in Campeonato Mineiro, one appearance in Supercopa do Brasil)	0	48	1
Atlético Mineiro	Total		100	9	13	0	28	1	30	3	171	13
Career total			135	11	14	0	28	1	49	3	226	15

== Honours ==
Internacional

- Campeonato Gaúcho: 2013, 2014, 2015, 2016

Atlético Mineiro

- Campeonato Brasileiro Série A: 2021
- Copa do Brasil: 2021
- Campeonato Mineiro: 2020, 2021, 2022
- Supercopa do Brasil: 2022

Individual

- Campeonato Brasileiro Série A Team of the Year: 2021
- Bola de Prata: 2021
