= 2014 Copa do Brasil knockout stage =

The knockout stages of the 2014 Copa do Brasil were played from August 27 to November 26, 2014. A total of 16 teams competed in the knockout stages.

A draw by CBF was held on August 18 to set the matches for this round. The 16 qualified teams were divided in two pots. Teams from pot 1 are the ones who competed at the 2014 Copa Libertadores plus the two highest CBF ranked teams qualified via the Third Round. Pot 2 is composed of the other teams that qualified through the Third Round. Each pot was divided into 4 pairs according to the CBF ranking. That division makes sure that each team within a pair will not face each other before the finals as they will be placed in opposite sides of the bracket. There was a draw to decide the home team of the round of 16. The following stages will have other draws to determine the order of the matches as the tournament advances.

== Seeding ==
| Pot 1 | Pot 2 |
|---|---|
| (Rio Grande do Sul) Grêmio (1); (São Paulo (state)) Corinthians (2); (Rio de Janeiro (state)) Flamengo (3); (Rio de Janeiro (state)) Vasco da Gama (4); (Minas Gerais) Cruzeiro (8); (Paraná (state)) Atlético Paranaense (10); (Rio de Janeiro (state)) Botafogo (12); (Minas Gerais) Atlético Mineiro (15) | (São Paulo (state)) Santos (9); (São Paulo (state)) Palmeiras (11); (Paraná (state)) Coritiba (14); Ceará (22); (Rio Grande do Norte) ABC (29); (São Paulo (state)) Bragantino (34); (Rio Grande do Norte) América de Natal (36); (Alagoas) Santa Rita (207) |

=== Bracket ===
Round of 16
(Rio Grande do Norte) América-RN | 3 | 0 | 3
(Paraná (state)) Atlético Paranaense | 0 | 2 | 2
(Paraná (state)) Coritiba | 3 | 0 | 3 (2)
(Rio de Janeiro (state)) Flamengo (pen.) | 0 | 3 | 3 (3)
(São Paulo (state)) Bragantino | 1 | 1 | 2
(São Paulo (state)) Corinthians | 0 | 3 | 3
(São Paulo (state)) Palmeiras | 0 | 0 | 0
(Minas Gerais) Atlético Mineiro | 1 | 2 | 3
(Minas Gerais) Cruzeiro | 5 | 2 | 7
(Alagoas) Santa Rita | 0 | 1 | 1
(Rio de Janeiro (state)) Vasco da Gama | 1 | 1 | 2
(Rio Grande do Norte) ABC | 1 | 2 | 3
(Rio de Janeiro (state)) Botafogo (a) | 1 | 4 | 5
Ceará | 2 | 3 | 5
(Rio Grande do Sul) Grêmio | 0 | – | 0
(São Paulo (state)) Santos | 2 | – | 2

Quarterfinals
(Rio Grande do Norte) América-RN | 0 | 0 | 0
(Rio de Janeiro (state)) Flamengo | 1 | 1 | 2
(São Paulo (state)) Corinthians | 2 | 1 | 3
(Minas Gerais) Atlético Mineiro | 0 | 4 | 4
(Minas Gerais) Cruzeiro (a) | 1 | 2 | 3
(Rio Grande do Norte) ABC | 0 | 3 | 3
(Rio de Janeiro (state)) Botafogo | 2 | 0 | 2
(São Paulo (state)) Santos | 3 | 5 | 8

Semifinals
(Rio de Janeiro (state)) Flamengo | 2 | 1 | 3
(Minas Gerais) Atlético Mineiro | 0 | 4 | 4
(Minas Gerais) Cruzeiro | 1 | 3 | 4
(São Paulo (state)) Santos | 0 | 3 | 3

Finals
(Minas Gerais) Atlético Mineiro | 2 | 1 | 3
(Minas Gerais) Cruzeiro | 0 | 0 | 0

== Round of 16 ==
The first legs will be played on August 27–28 and the second legs will be played on September 3–4, 2014.

| Team 1 | Agg. | Team 2 | 1st leg | 2nd leg |
|---|---|---|---|---|
| Santos (São Paulo (state)) | 2–0 | (Rio Grande do Sul) Grêmio | 2–0 | – |
| Ceará | 5–5 (a) | (Rio de Janeiro (state)) Botafogo | 2–1 | 3–4 |
| Santa Rita (Alagoas) | 1–7 | (Minas Gerais) Cruzeiro | 0–5 | 1–2 |
| ABC (Rio Grande do Norte) | 3–2 | (Rio de Janeiro (state)) Vasco da Gama | 1–1 | 2–1 |
| Flamengo (Rio de Janeiro (state)) | 3–3 (3–2 p) | (Paraná (state)) Coritiba | 0–3 | 3–0 |
| Atlético Paranaense (Paraná (state)) | 2–3 | (Rio Grande do Norte) América de Natal | 0–3 | 2–0 |
| Atlético Mineiro (Minas Gerais) | 3–0 | (São Paulo (state)) Palmeiras | 1–0 | 2–0 |
| Corinthians (São Paulo (state)) | 3–2 | (São Paulo (state)) Bragantino | 0–1 | 3–1 |

=== Match 71 ===
August 28, 2014
20:00 UTC−3

| Grêmio (Rio Grande do Sul) | 0–2 | (São Paulo (state)) Santos |
|---|---|---|
| | Report | David Braz 37'; Robinho 45' |

Arena do Grêmio, Porto Alegre
Attendance: 30,294
Referee: Wilton Pereira Sampaio (Goiás)

September 3, 2014
22:00 UTC−3

| Santos (São Paulo (state)) | Canceled (Note: Due to racist chants against Santos' player Aranha by Grêmio fans in the first leg, the STJD suspended the second leg scheduled for September 3rd and removed Grêmio from the tournament, thus automatically qualifying Santos to the next round.) | (Rio Grande do Sul) Grêmio |

Estádio Urbano Caldeira (Vila Belmiro), Santos

Santos advanced directly due to Grêmio's disqualification.

=== Match 72 ===
August 27, 2014
22:00 UTC−3

| Botafogo (Rio de Janeiro (state)) | 1–2 | Ceará |
|---|---|---|
| Edílson 80' | Report | Eduardo 15'; Bill 45+3' |

Estádio Jornalista Mário Filho (Maracanã), Rio de Janeiro
Attendance: 8,459
Referee: Bráulio da Silva Machado (Mato Grosso do Sul)

September 3, 2014
22:00 UTC−3

| Ceará | 3–4 | (Rio de Janeiro (state)) Botafogo |
|---|---|---|
| Bill 20', 75'; Magno Alves 26' (pen.) | Report | Edílson 15'; Yuri Mamute 45+1'; Ramírez 90+4'; André Bahia 90+5' |

Estádio Governador Plácido Castelo (Castelão), Fortaleza
Attendance: 37,794
Referee: Emerson de Almeida (Minas Gerais)

Tied 5–5 on aggregate, Botafogo won on away goals.

=== Match 73 ===
August 27, 2014
19:30 UTC−3

| Cruzeiro (Minas Gerais) | 5–0 | (Alagoas) Santa Rita |
|---|---|---|
| Marcelo Moreno 8', 54'; Dedé 17'; Júlio Baptista 34'; Henrique 86' | Report |

Estádio Governador Magalhães Pinto (Mineirão), Belo Horizonte
Attendance: 16,474
Referee: Ranilton Oliveira de Sousa (Maranhão)

September 3, 2014
19:30 UTC−3

| Santa Rita (Alagoas) | 1–2 | (Minas Gerais) Cruzeiro |
|---|---|---|
| Cristiano Fontes 44' | Report | Júlio Baptista 70'; Marcelo Moreno 72' |

Estádio Coaracy da Mata, Arapiraca
Attendance: 975
Referee: Renan Roberto de Souza (Paraíba)

Cruzeiro won 7–1 on aggregate.

=== Match 74 ===
August 26, 2014
19:30 UTC−3

| Vasco da Gama (Rio de Janeiro (state)) | 1–1 | (Rio Grande do Norte) ABC |
|---|---|---|
| Kléber 22' | Report | João Paulo 2' |

Estádio São Januário, Rio de Janeiro
Attendance: 6,872
Referee: Wagner Reway (Mato Grosso)

September 2, 2014
19:30 UTC−3

| ABC (Rio Grande do Norte) | 2–1 | (Rio de Janeiro (state)) Vasco da Gama |
|---|---|---|
| Madson 12'; Marlon 49' | Report | M. Rodríguez 58' |

Arena das Dunas, Natal
Attendance: 28,200
Referee: Luiz Flávio de Oliveira (São Paulo)

ABC won 3–2 on aggregate.

=== Match 75 ===
August 27, 2014
22:00 UTC−3

| Coritiba (Paraná (state)) | 3–0 | (Rio de Janeiro (state)) Flamengo |
|---|---|---|
| Leandro Almeida 60'; Luiz Antônio 73' (o.g.); Zé Eduardo 89' (pen.) | Report |

Estádio Couto Pereira, Curitiba
Attendance: 8,695
Referee: Marcelo Aparecido R. de Souza (São Paulo)

September 3, 2014
22:00 UTC−3

| Flamengo (Rio de Janeiro (state)) | 3–0 | (Paraná (state)) Coritiba |
|---|---|---|
| Alecsandro 45+3' (pen.), 56' (pen.); Eduardo 80' | Report |
Penalties
| Alecsandro (penalty missed); Chicão (penalty scored); João Paulo (penalty missed); Eduardo (penalty scored); Léo Moura (penalty missed); Canteros (penalty scored) | 3–2 | (penalty missed) Zé Eduardo; (penalty missed) Helder; (penalty scored) Robinho; (penalty scored) Leandro Almeida; (penalty missed) Dudu; (penalty missed) Carlinhos |

Estádio Jornalista Mário Filho (Maracanã), Rio de Janeiro
Attendance: 20,450
Referee: Wagner Reway (Mato Grosso)

Tied 3–3 on aggregate, Flamengo won 3–2 on penalties.

=== Match 76 ===
August 27, 2014
19:30 UTC−3

| América (Rio Grande do Norte) | 3–0 | (Paraná (state)) Atlético Paranaense |
|---|---|---|
| Rodrigo Pimpão 40'; Max 45+2' (pen.); Thiago Cristian 80' | Report |

Arena das Dunas, Natal
Attendance: 12,554
Referee: Marielson Alves Silva (Bahia)

September 3, 2014
19:30 UTC−3

| Atlético Paranaense (Paraná (state)) | 2–0 | (Rio Grande do Norte) América |
|---|---|---|
| Deivid 7'; Marcelo 87' | Report |

Arena da Baixada, Curitiba
Attendance: 17,369
Referee: Thiago Duarte Peixoto (São Paulo)

América won 3–2 on aggregate.

=== Match 77 ===
August 27, 2014
22:00 UTC−3

| Palmeiras (São Paulo (state)) | 0–1 | (Minas Gerais) Atlético Mineiro |
|---|---|---|
| | Report | Luan 70' |

Estádio Municipal Paulo Machado de Carvalho (Pacaembu), São Paulo
Attendance: 19,340
Referee: Jean Pierre Gonçalves Lima (Rio Grande do Sul)

September 4, 2014
20:00 UTC−3

| Atlético Mineiro (Minas Gerais) | 2–0 | (São Paulo (state)) Palmeiras |
|---|---|---|
| Jemerson 12'; Luan 17' | Report |

Estádio Independência, Belo Horizonte
Attendance: 19,657
Referee: Paulo Henrique Godoy Bezerra (Santa Catarina)

Atlético Mineiro won 3–0 on aggregate.

=== Match 78 ===
August 27, 2014
22:00 UTC−3

| Bragantino (São Paulo (state)) | 1–0 | (São Paulo (state)) Corinthians |
|---|---|---|
| Sandro 55' | Report |

Arena Pantanal, Cuiabá
Attendance: 31,473
Referee: Leandro Bizzio Marinho (São Paulo)

September 3, 2014
22:00 UTC−3

| Corinthians (São Paulo (state)) | 3–1 | (São Paulo (state)) Bragantino |
|---|---|---|
| Renato Augusto 3'; Ralf 14'; Felipe 19' | Report | Guilherme Mattis 89' |

Arena Corinthians, São Paulo
Attendance: 28,073
Referee: Vinicius Furlan (São Paulo)

Corinthians won 3–2 on aggregate.

== Quarterfinals ==
| Team 1 | Agg. | Team 2 | 1st leg | 2nd leg |
|---|---|---|---|---|
| Santos (São Paulo (state)) | 8–2 | (Rio de Janeiro (state)) Botafogo | 3–2 | 5-0 |
| ABC (Rio Grande do Norte) | 3–3 (a) | (Minas Gerais) Cruzeiro | 0–1 | 3-2 |
| Flamengo (Rio de Janeiro (state)) | 2–0 | (Rio Grande do Norte) América de Natal | 1–0 | 1–0 |
| Atlético Mineiro (Minas Gerais) | 4–3 | (São Paulo (state)) Corinthians | 0–2 | 4-1 |

=== Match 79 ===
October 1, 2014
19:30 UTC−3

| Botafogo (Rio de Janeiro (state)) | 2–3 | (São Paulo (state)) Santos |
|---|---|---|
| Gabriel 25'; Zeballos 56' | Report | Robinho 24', 28'; Geuvânio 43' |

Estádio Jornalista Mário Filho (Maracanã), Rio de Janeiro
Attendance: 8,714
Referee: Dewson Fernando Freitas da Silva (Pará)

October 16, 2014
21:30 UTC−3

| Santos (São Paulo (state)) | 5–0 | (Rio de Janeiro (state)) Botafogo |
|---|---|---|
| Gabriel 5'; David Braz 9', 62'; Lucas Lima 37'; Geuvânio 68' | Report |

Estádio Municipal Paulo Machado de Carvalho (Pacaembu), São Paulo
Attendance: 13,459
Referee: Héber Roberto Lopes (Santa Catarina)

Santos won 8–2 on aggregate.

=== Match 80 ===
October 1, 2014
19:30 UTC−3

| Cruzeiro (Minas Gerais) | 1–0 | (Rio Grande do Norte) ABC |
|---|---|---|
| Léo 79' | Report |

Estádio Governador Magalhães Pinto (Mineirão), Belo Horizonte
Attendance: 14,093
Referee: Pablo Dos Santos Alves (Espírito Santo)

October 15, 2014
22:00 UTC−3

| ABC (Rio Grande do Norte) | 3–2 | (Minas Gerais) Cruzeiro |
|---|---|---|
| Rodrigo Silva 60'; Xuxa 66' (pen.); Alvinho 86' | Report | Willian 30'; Henrique 42' |

Arena das Dunas, Natal
Attendance: 15,488
Referee: Anderson Daronco (Rio Grande do Sul)

Tied 3–3 on aggregate, Cruzeiro won on away goals.

=== Match 81 ===
October 1, 2014
22:00 UTC−3

| América de Natal (Rio Grande do Norte) | 0–1 | (Rio de Janeiro (state)) Flamengo |
|---|---|---|
| | Report | Gabriel 46' |

Arena das Dunas, Natal
Attendance: 30,575
Referee: Héber Roberto Lopes (Santa Catarina)

October 15, 2014
22:00 UTC−3

| Flamengo (Rio de Janeiro (state)) | 1–0 | (Rio Grande do Norte) América de Natal |
|---|---|---|
| Gabriel 64' | Report |

Estádio Jornalista Mário Filho (Maracanã), Rio de Janeiro
Attendance: 42,406
Referee: Elmo Alves Resende Cunha (Goiás)

Flamengo won 2–0 on aggregate.

=== Match 82 ===
October 1, 2014
22:00 UTC−3

| Corinthians (São Paulo (state)) | 2–0 | (Minas Gerais) Atlético Mineiro |
|---|---|---|
| Guerrero 24'; Luciano 81' | Report |

Arena Corinthians, São Paulo
Attendance: 27,791
Referee: Péricles Bassols (Rio de Janeiro)

October 15, 2014
22:00 UTC−3

| Atlético Mineiro (Minas Gerais) | 4–1 | (São Paulo (state)) Corinthians |
|---|---|---|
| Luan 24'; Guilherme 32', 75'; Edcarlos 87' | Report | Guerrero 5' |

Estádio Governador Magalhães Pinto (Mineirão), Belo Horizonte
Attendance: 32,640
Referee: Leandro Vuaden (Rio Grande do Sul)

Atlético Mineiro won 4–3 on aggregate.

== Semifinals ==
| Team 1 | Agg. | Team 2 | 1st leg | 2nd leg |
|---|---|---|---|---|
| Santos (São Paulo (state)) | 3–4 | (Minas Gerais) Cruzeiro | 0–1 | 3–3 |
| Atlético Mineiro (Minas Gerais) | 4–3 | (Rio de Janeiro (state)) Flamengo | 0–2 | 4–1 |

=== Match 83 ===
October 29, 2014
22:00 UTC−2

| Cruzeiro (Minas Gerais) | 1–0 | (São Paulo (state)) Santos |
|---|---|---|
| Willian 10' | Report |

Estádio Governador Magalhães Pinto (Mineirão), Belo Horizonte
Attendance: 25,714
Referee: Marcelo de Lima Henrique (Rio de Janeiro)

November 5, 2014
22:00 UTC−2

| Santos (São Paulo (state)) | 3–3 | (Minas Gerais) Cruzeiro |
|---|---|---|
| Robinho 2'; Gabriel 45+2' (pen.); Rildo 59' | Report | Marcelo Moreno 7'; Willian 80', 90+4' |

Estádio Urbano Caldeira (Vila Belmiro), Santos
Attendance: 11,952
Referee: Dewson Fernando Freitas da Silva (Pará)

Cruzeiro won 4–3 on aggregate.

=== Match 84 ===
October 29, 2014
22:00 UTC−2

| Flamengo (Rio de Janeiro (state)) | 2–0 | (Minas Gerais) Atlético Mineiro |
|---|---|---|
| Cáceres 61'; Chicão 78' (pen.) | Report |

Estádio Jornalista Mário Filho (Maracanã), Rio de Janeiro
Attendance: 45,642
Referee: Luiz Flávio de Oliveira (São Paulo)

November 5, 2014
22:00 UTC−2

| Atlético Mineiro (Minas Gerais) | 4–1 | (Rio de Janeiro (state)) Flamengo |
|---|---|---|
| Carlos 41'; Maicosuel 57'; Dátolo 80'; Luan 84' | Report | Éverton 34' |

Estádio Governador Magalhães Pinto (Mineirão), Belo Horizonte
Attendance: 41,352
Referee: Anderson Daronco (Rio Grande do Sul)

Atlético Mineiro won 4–3 on aggregate.

== Finals ==
| Team 1 | Agg. | Team 2 | 1st leg | 2nd leg |
|---|---|---|---|---|
| Cruzeiro (Minas Gerais) | 0–3 | (Minas Gerais) Atlético Mineiro | 0–2 | 0–1 |

November 12, 2014
22:00 UTC−2

| Atlético Mineiro (Minas Gerais) | 2–0 | (Minas Gerais) Cruzeiro |
|---|---|---|
| Luan 8'; Dátolo 58' | Report |

Estádio Independência, Belo Horizonte
Attendance: 18,578
Referee: Marcelo de Lima Henrique (Rio de Janeiro)

November 26, 2014
22:00 UTC−2

| Cruzeiro (Minas Gerais) | 0–1 | (Minas Gerais) Atlético Mineiro |
|---|---|---|
| | Report | Diego Tardelli 45+2' |

Estádio Governador Magalhães Pinto (Mineirão), Belo Horizonte
Attendance: 39,786
Referee: Luiz Flávio de Oliveira (São Paulo)

Atlético Mineiro won 3–0 on aggregate.
