= 2014 Copa do Brasil Third Round =

The 2014 Copa do Brasil Third Round was played from 23 July to 14 August 2014 and decided the 10 teams advancing to the knockout rounds. Different than the first two rounds, in this round the away team that wins the first match by 2 or more goals do not progress straight to the next round avoiding the second leg. The order of the matches was determined by a random draw.

== Third round ==
Team 1	Agg.	Team 2	1st leg	2nd leg
Vasco da Gama (Rio de Janeiro (state))	4–1	(São Paulo (state)) Ponte Preta	2–0	2–1
Novo Hamburgo (Rio Grande do Sul)	2–1	(Rio Grande do Norte) ABC^{1}	0–1	2–0
Santos (São Paulo (state))	3–2	(Paraná (state)) Londrina	1−2	2−0
Palmeiras (São Paulo (state))	3–0	(Santa Catarina (state)) Avaí	2–0	1–0
Fluminense (Rio de Janeiro (state))	5–5 (a)	(Rio Grande do Norte) América de Natal	3–0	2–5
Bahia	1–3	(São Paulo (state)) Corinthians	0–3	1–0
Santa Cruz (Pernambuco)	3–4	(Alagoas) Santa Rita	2–3	1–1
São Paulo (São Paulo (state))	3–4	(São Paulo (state)) Bragantino	2–1	1–3
Paysandu (Pará)	2–3	(Paraná (state)) Coritiba	0−2	2−1
Ceará	5–2	(Rio Grande do Sul) Internacional	2–1	3–1

- Note 1: Novo Hamburgo won 2–1 on aggregate but was disqualified by the STJD after being punished for fielding an ineligible player.

=== Match 61 ===
July 23, 2014
22:00 UTC−03:00

Ponte Preta (São Paulo (state))	0–2	(Rio de Janeiro (state)) Vasco da Gama
		Diego Renan 55'; Thalles 61'

Estádio Moisés Lucarelli, Campinas
Attendance: 3,593
Referee: Ricardo Marques Ribeiro (Minas Gerais)

July 30, 2014
22:00 UTC−03:00

Vasco da Gama (Rio de Janeiro (state))	2–1	(São Paulo (state)) Ponte Preta
Douglas 20' (pen.); Rafael Costa 41' (o.g.)		Jonathan Cafu 38'

Estádio São Januário, Rio de Janeiro
Attendance: 7,734
Referee: Francisco Carlos do Nascimento (Alagoas)

Vasco da Gama won 4–1 on aggregate.

=== Match 62 ===
July 23, 2014
19:30 UTC−03:00

ABC (Rio Grande do Norte)	1–0	(Rio Grande do Sul) Novo Hamburgo
Rodrigo Silva 90+5'

Frasqueirão, Natal
Attendance: 2,973
Referee: Paulo Schleich Vollkopf (Mato Grosso do Sul)

July 30, 2014
19:30 UTC−03:00

Novo Hamburgo (Rio Grande do Sul)	2–0	(Rio Grande do Norte) ABC
Afonso 27'; Juba 90+1'

Estádio do Vale, Novo Hamburgo
Referee: Bráulio da Silva Machado (Santa Catarina)

Novo Hamburgo won 2–1 on aggregate but was disqualified by the STJD after being punished for fielding an ineligible player.

=== Match 63 ===
July 31, 2014
21:00 UTC−03:00

Londrina (Paraná (state))	2−1	(São Paulo (state)) Santos
Joel 24', 90'		Geuvânio 86'

Estádio do Café, Londrina
Attendance: 15,331
Referee: Igor Junio Benevenuto (Minas Gerais)

August 14, 2014
19:30 UTC−03:00

Santos (São Paulo (state))	2−0	(Paraná (state)) Londrina
Robinho 53'; Rildo 89'

Estádio Urbano Caldeira (Vila Belmiro), Santos
Attendance: 4,498
Referee: Wagner dos Santos Rosa (Rio de Janeiro)

Santos won 3–2 on aggregate.

=== Match 64 ===
July 23, 2014
19:30 UTC−03:00

Avaí (Santa Catarina (state))	0–2	(São Paulo (state)) Palmeiras
		Felipe Menezes 63', 71'

Estádio da Ressacada, Florianópolis
Attendance: 8,512
Referee: Wagner Reway (Mato Grosso)

August 6, 2014
19:30 UTC−03:00

Palmeiras (São Paulo (state))	1–0	(Santa Catarina (state)) Avaí
Mouche 75'

Estádio Municipal Paulo Machado de Carvalho (Pacaembu), São Paulo
Attendance: 7,335
Referee: Paulo H. Schleich Vollkopf (Mato Grosso do Sul)

Palmeiras won 3–0 on aggregate.

=== Match 65 ===
August 6, 2014
22:00 UTC−03:00

América de Natal (Rio Grande do Norte)	0–3	(Rio de Janeiro (state)) Fluminense
		Cícero 9', 48'; Conca 66'

Arena das Dunas, Natal
Attendance: 25,502
Referee: Dewson Fernando Freitas da Silva (Pará)

August 13, 2014
22:00 UTC−03:00

Fluminense (Rio de Janeiro (state))	2–5	(Rio Grande do Norte) América de Natal
Fred 31'; Cícero 37'		Marcelinho 17'; Max 50'; Alfredo 75', 83'; Rodrigo Pimpão 90'

Estádio Jornalista Mário Filho (Maracanã), Rio de Janeiro
Attendance: 4,748
Referee: Rodrigo D. Alonso Ferreira (Santa Catarina)

Tied 5–5 on aggregate, América de Natal won on away goals.

=== Match 66 ===
July 23, 2014
22:00 UTC−03:00

Corinthians (São Paulo (state))	3–0	Bahia
Elias 18'; Romero 32'; Renato Augusto 89' (pen.)

Arena Corinthians, São Paulo
Attendance: 24,496
Referee: Igor Junio Benevenuto (Minas Gerais)

August 6, 2014
22:00 UTC−03:00

Bahia	1–0	(São Paulo (state)) Corinthians
Guilherme Andrade 31' (o.g.)

Arena Fonte Nova, Salvador
Attendance: 5,809
Referee: Charles Hebert Cavalcante Ferreira (Alagoas)

Corinthians won 3–1 on aggregate.

=== Match 67 ===
August 6, 2014
22:00 UTC−03:00

Santa Rita (Alagoas)	3–2	(Pernambuco) Santa Cruz
Tinga 38'; Rafael Silva 66'; Reinaldo Alagoano 78' (pen.)		Léo Gamalho 50', 59'

Estádio Rei Pelé, Maceió
Attendance: 581
Referee: Devarly Lira do Rosário (Espírito Santo)

August 14, 2014
19:30 UTC−03:00

Santa Cruz (Pernambuco)	1–1	(Alagoas) Santa Rita
Betinho 81'		Rafael Silva 3'

Estádio do Arruda, Recife
Referee: Italo Medeiros de Azevedo (Rio Grande do Norte)

Santa Rita won 4–3 on aggregate.

=== Match 68 ===
July 30, 2014
22:00 UTC−03:00

Bragantino (São Paulo (state))	1–2	(São Paulo (state)) São Paulo
Luisinho 83'		Bruno Recife 16' (o.g.); Alexandre Pato 76' (pen.)

Estádio Santa Cruz, Ribeirão Preto
Attendance: 11,054
Referee: Thiago Duarte Peixoto (São Paulo)

August 13, 2014
22:00 UTC−03:00

São Paulo (São Paulo (state))	1–3	(São Paulo (state)) Bragantino
Paulo Miranda 7'		Cesinha 22'; Gustavo Carbonieri 64'; Guilherme Mattis 74'

Estádio Cícero Pompeu de Toledo (Morumbi), São Paulo
Attendance: 7,522
Referee: Flávio Rodrigues de Souza (São Paulo)

Bragantino won 4–3 on aggregate.

=== Match 69 ===
July 31, 2014
21:00 UTC−03:00

Coritiba (Paraná (state))	2−0	(Pará) Paysandu
Zé Eduardo 42'; Keirrison 64'

Estádio Couto Pereira, Curitiba
Attendance: 9,715
Referee: Gilberto Rodrigues Castro Junior (Pernambuco)

August 13, 2014
22:00 UTC−03:00

Paysandu (Pará)	2−1	(Paraná (state)) Coritiba
Charles 82'; Dennis 84'		Robinho 80'

Estádio Zinho de Oliveira, Marabá
Attendance: 1,475
Referee: Arilson Bispo da Anunciacão (Bahia)

Coritiba won 3–2 on aggregate.

=== Match 70 ===
July 30, 2014
22:00 UTC−03:00

Internacional (Rio Grande do Sul)	1–2	Ceará
Alan Ruschel 90+2'		Nikão 55'; Ricardinho 90+3'

Estádio José Pinheiro Borda (Beira-Rio), Porto Alegre
Attendance: 21,728
Referee: Fábio Filipus (Paraná)

August 13, 2014
22:00 UTC−03:00

Ceará	3–1	(Rio Grande do Sul) Internacional
Magno Alves 10', 81'; Bill 65'		Valdívia 69'

Estádio Governador Plácido Castelo (Castelão), Fortaleza
Attendance: 48,545
Referee: Ricardo Marques Ribeiro (Minas Gerais)

Ceará won 5–2 on aggregate.
