= 2014 Copa do Brasil =

Copa Sadia do Brasil 2014

Tournament details
- Country: Brazil
- Dates: 19 February – 26 November
- Teams: 87

Final positions
- Champions: (Minas Gerais) Atlético Mineiro (1st title)
- Runners-up: (Minas Gerais) Cruzeiro

Tournament statistics
- Matches played: 159
- Goals scored: 432 (2.72 per match)
- Top goal scorer(s): (Brazil) Bill (Brazil) Gabriel (6 goals each)

The 2014 Copa do Brasil (officially the 2014 Copa Sadia do Brasil for sponsorship reasons) was the 26th edition of the Copa do Brasil football competition. The competition was contested by 87 teams, either qualified through participating their respective state championships (71), by the CBF Rankings (10) or those qualified for 2014 Copa Libertadores (6). Clubs that qualified for the 2014 Copa Libertadores entered the competition in the 4th stage. The seven best teams of the 2013 Brazilian Championship eliminated until the third round qualified for the 2014 Copa Sudamericana.

== Format ==
The competition was a single elimination knockout tournament featuring two-legged ties. In the first two rounds, if the away team won the first match by 2 or more goals, it progressed straight to the next round avoiding the second leg. The away goals rule was also used in the 2014 Copa do Brasil. The Copa winner qualifies for the 2015 Copa Libertadores.

== Qualified Teams ==
The teams (in bold) qualified for 2014 Copa Libertadores qualified directly for the Fourth Stage (round of 16) of the Copa do Brasil.

Association	Team (Berth)	Qualification method
(Acre (state)) Acre; 2 berths	Plácido de Castro	2013 Campeonato Acreano champions
(Acre (state)) Acre; 2 berths	Rio Branco	2013 Campeonato Acreano runners-up
(Alagoas) Alagoas; 3+1 berths	CRB	2013 Campeonato Alagoano champions
(Alagoas) Alagoas; 3+1 berths	CSA	2013 Campeonato Alagoano runners-up
(Alagoas) Alagoas; 3+1 berths	Santa Rita	2013 Campeonato Alagoano first stage winners
(Alagoas) Alagoas; 3+1 berths	ASA	8th best placed team in 2014 CBF-Ranking not already qualified
(Amapá) Amapá; 1 berth	Santos	2013 Campeonato Amapaense champions
(Amazonas (Brazilian state)) Amazonas; 2 berths	Princesa do Solimões	2013 Campeonato Amazonense champions
(Amazonas (Brazilian state)) Amazonas; 2 berths	Nacional	2013 Campeonato Amazonense runners-up
(Bahia) Bahia; 3+1 berths	Vitória	2013 Campeonato Baiano champions
(Bahia) Bahia; 3+1 berths	Juazeiro	2013 Campeonato Baiano first stage runners-up
(Bahia) Bahia; 3+1 berths	Bahia de Feira	2013 Copa Governador do Estado da Bahia champions
(Bahia) Bahia; 3+1 berths	Bahia	2nd best placed team in 2014 CBF-Ranking not already qualified
(Ceará) Ceará; 3 berths	Ceará	2013 Campeonato Cearense champions
(Ceará) Ceará; 3 berths	Horizonte	2013 Campeonato Cearense first stage winners
(Ceará) Ceará; 3 berths	Barbalha	2013 Copa Fares Lopes champions
(Federal District (Brazil)) Federal District; 2 berths	Brasiliense	2013 Campeonato Brasiliense champions
(Federal District (Brazil)) Federal District; 2 berths	Brasília	2013 Campeonato Brasiliense runners-up
Espírito Santo; 2 berths	Desportiva Ferroviária	2013 Campeonato Capixaba champions
Espírito Santo; 2 berths	Real Noroeste	2013 Copa Espírito Santo champions
(Goiás) Goiás; 3 berths	Goiás	2013 Campeonato Goiano champions
(Goiás) Goiás; 3 berths	Atlético Goianiense	2013 Campeonato Goiano runners-up
(Goiás) Goiás; 3 berths	Goianésia	2013 Campeonato Goiano 3rd place
(Maranhão) Maranhão; 2 berths	Maranhão	2013 Campeonato Maranhense champions
(Maranhão) Maranhão; 2 berths	Sampaio Corrêa	2013 Copa São Luís champions
(Mato Grosso) Mato Grosso; 3 berths	Cuiabá	2013 Campeonato Mato-Grossense champions
(Mato Grosso) Mato Grosso; 3 berths	Mixto	2013 Campeonato Mato-Grossense runners-up
(Mato Grosso) Mato Grosso; 3 berths	Rondonópolis	2013 Copa Governador de Mato Grosso champions
Mato Grosso do Sul 2 berths	CENE	2013 Campeonato Sul-Mato-Grossense champions
Mato Grosso do Sul 2 berths	Naviraiense	2013 Campeonato Sul-Mato-Grossense runners-up
Minas Gerais; 4+2+1 berths	**Atlético Mineiro**	**2013 Copa Libertadores champions**
Minas Gerais; 4+2+1 berths	**Cruzeiro**	**2013 Campeonato Brasileiro Série A Champions**
Minas Gerais; 4+2+1 berths	Villa Nova	2013 Campeonato Mineiro 3rd place
Minas Gerais; 4+2+1 berths	Tombense	2013 Campeonato Mineiro 4th place
Minas Gerais; 4+2+1 berths	Tupi	2013 Campeonato Mineiro 5th place
Minas Gerais; 4+2+1 berths	Caldense	2013 Campeonato Mineiro 6th place
Minas Gerais; 4+2+1 berths	América Mineiro	6th best placed team in 2014 CBF-Ranking not already qualified
(Pará) Pará; 3 berths	Paysandu	2013 Campeonato Paraense champions
(Pará) Pará; 3 berths	Paragominas	2013 Campeonato Paraense runners-up
(Pará) Pará; 3 berths	Remo	2013 Campeonato Paraense 3rd place
(Paraíba) Paraíba; 2 berths	Botafogo	2013 Campeonato Paraibano champions
(Paraíba) Paraíba; 2 berths	Treze	2013 Campeonato Paraibano runners-up
(Paraná (state)) Paraná; 4+1 berths	**Atlético Paranaense**	**2013 Campeonato Brasileiro Série A Third Place**
(Paraná (state)) Paraná; 4+1 berths	Coritiba	2013 Campeonato Paranaense champions
(Paraná (state)) Paraná; 4+1 berths	Londrina	2013 Campeonato Paranaense 3rd place
(Paraná (state)) Paraná; 4+1 berths	Paraná	2013 Campeonato Paranaense 4th place
(Paraná (state)) Paraná; 4+1 berths	J. Malucelli	2013 Campeonato Paranaense 5th place
(Pernambuco) Pernambuco; 3 berths	Santa Cruz	2013 Campeonato Pernambucano champions
(Pernambuco) Pernambuco; 3 berths	Sport	2013 Campeonato Pernambucano runners-up
(Pernambuco) Pernambuco; 3 berths	Náutico	2013 Campeonato Pernambucano first stage winners
(Piauí) Piauí; 2 berths	Parnahyba	2013 Campeonato Piauiense champions
(Piauí) Piauí; 2 berths	Flamengo	2013 Copa Piauí champions
(Rio de Janeiro (state)) Rio de Janeiro; 5+2 berths	**Flamengo**	**2013 Copa do Brasil champions**
(Rio de Janeiro (state)) Rio de Janeiro; 5+2 berths	**Botafogo**	**2013 Campeonato Brasileiro Série A Fourth Place**
(Rio de Janeiro (state)) Rio de Janeiro; 5+2 berths	Fluminense	2013 Campeonato Carioca 3rd place
(Rio de Janeiro (state)) Rio de Janeiro; 5+2 berths	Vasco da Gama	2013 Campeonato Carioca 4th place
(Rio de Janeiro (state)) Rio de Janeiro; 5+2 berths	Resende	2013 Campeonato Carioca 5th place
(Rio de Janeiro (state)) Rio de Janeiro; 5+2 berths	Boavista	2013 Campeonato Carioca 6th place
(Rio de Janeiro (state)) Rio de Janeiro; 5+2 berths	Duque de Caxias	2013 Copa Rio champions
(Rio Grande do Norte) Rio Grande do Norte; 3 berths	Potiguar	2013 Campeonato Potiguar champions
(Rio Grande do Norte) Rio Grande do Norte; 3 berths	América de Natal	2013 Campeonato Potiguar runners-up
(Rio Grande do Norte) Rio Grande do Norte; 3 berths	ABC	2013 Campeonato Potiguar 3rd place
(Rio Grande do Sul) Rio Grande do Sul; 4+1 berths	**Grêmio**	**2013 Campeonato Brasileiro Série A Runner up**
(Rio Grande do Sul) Rio Grande do Sul; 4+1 berths	Internacional	2013 Campeonato Gaúcho champions
(Rio Grande do Sul) Rio Grande do Sul; 4+1 berths	Lajeadense	2013 Campeonato Gaúcho runners-up
(Rio Grande do Sul) Rio Grande do Sul; 4+1 berths	São Luiz	2013 Campeonato Gaúcho 3rd place
(Rio Grande do Sul) Rio Grande do Sul; 4+1 berths	Novo Hamburgo	2013 Copa FGF champions
(Rondônia) Rondônia; 1 berth	Vilhena	2013 Campeonato Rondoniense champions
(Roraima) Roraima; 1 berth	Náutico	2013 Campeonato Roraimense champions
(São Paulo (state)) São Paulo; 5+5 berths	Corinthians	2013 Campeonato Paulista champions
(São Paulo (state)) São Paulo; 5+5 berths	Santos	2013 Campeonato Paulista runners-up
(São Paulo (state)) São Paulo; 5+5 berths	São Paulo	2013 Campeonato Paulista 3rd place
(São Paulo (state)) São Paulo; 5+5 berths	Portuguesa	2013 Campeonato Paulista Série A2 champions
(São Paulo (state)) São Paulo; 5+5 berths	São Bernardo	2013 Copa Paulista champions
(São Paulo (state)) São Paulo; 5+5 berths	Palmeiras	Best placed team in 2014 CBF-Ranking not already qualified
(São Paulo (state)) São Paulo; 5+5 berths	Ponte Preta	3rd best placed team in 2014 CBF-Ranking not already qualified
(São Paulo (state)) São Paulo; 5+5 berths	Guarani	7th best placed team in 2014 CBF-Ranking not already qualified
(São Paulo (state)) São Paulo; 5+5 berths	Grêmio Barueri	9th best placed team in 2014 CBF-Ranking not already qualified
(São Paulo (state)) São Paulo; 5+5 berths	Bragantino	10th best placed team in 2014 CBF-Ranking not already qualified
(Santa Catarina (state)) Santa Catarina; 3+2 berths	Criciúma	2013 Campeonato Catarinense champions
(Santa Catarina (state)) Santa Catarina; 3+2 berths	Chapecoense	2013 Campeonato Catarinense runners-up
(Santa Catarina (state)) Santa Catarina; 3+2 berths	Joinville	2013 Copa Santa Catarina champions
(Santa Catarina (state)) Santa Catarina; 3+2 berths	Avaí	4th best placed team in 2014 CBF-Ranking not already qualified
(Santa Catarina (state)) Santa Catarina; 3+2 berths	Figueirense	5th best placed team in 2014 CBF-Ranking not already qualified
(Sergipe) Sergipe; 2 berths	Sergipe	2013 Campeonato Sergipano champions
(Sergipe) Sergipe; 2 berths	Lagarto^{[A]}	2013 Copa Governo do Estado de Sergipe 3rd place
(Tocantins) Tocantins; 1 berth	Interporto	2013 Campeonato Tocantinense champions

A. River Plate was originally qualified as runners-up of the 2013 Campeonato Sergipano. Because of their request to be absent for 2 two years of the Campeonato Sergiano due to financial problems, Lagarto earned their spot.

== Draw ==
A draw by CBF held on January 10, 2014, set the matches for this round. The 81 qualified teams were divided in eight pots (A-H) with 10 teams each. They were divided based on the CBF Rankings and the matches were drawn from the respective confronts: A x E; B x F; C x G; D x H. The lower ranked teams of each match will host the first leg. Before the Round of 16 there was another draw including the six teams that will play the 2014 Copa Libertadores.

Group A	Group B	Group C	Group D
(São Paulo (state)) Corinthians (Rio de Janeiro (state)) Vasco da Gama (Rio de Janeiro (state)) Fluminense (Rio Grande do Sul) Internacional (São Paulo (state)) São Paulo (São Paulo (state)) Santos (São Paulo (state)) Palmeiras; Goiás (Paraná (state)) Coritiba (Bahia) Vitória	Bahia (São Paulo (state)) Ponte Preta (São Paulo (state)) Portuguesa (Goiás) Atlético Goianiense (Pernambuco) Náutico; Ceará (Santa Catarina (state)) Avaí (Pernambuco) Sport (Santa Catarina (state)) Figueirense (Santa Catarina (state)) Criciúma	(Paraná (state)) Paraná (Minas Gerais) América Mineiro (Rio Grande do Norte) ABC (São Paulo (state)) Guarani (Alagoas) ASA (Pará) Paysandu (São Paulo (state)) Grêmio Barueri (São Paulo (state)) Bragantino (Rio Grande do Norte) América de Natal (Santa Catarina (state)) Chapecoense	(Santa Catarina (state)) Joinville (Pernambuco) Santa Cruz (Federal District (Brazil)) Brasiliense (Alagoas) CRB (Rio de Janeiro (state)) Duque de Caxias (Maranhão) Sampaio Corrêa (Paraíba) Treze (Amazonas (Brazilian state)) Nacional (Mato Grosso) Cuiabá (Minas Gerais) Tupi
Group E	Group F	Group G	Group H
(Ceará) Horizonte (Pará) Remo (Mato Grosso) Mixto (Alagoas) CSA (Paraíba) Botafogo (Paraná (state)) J. Malucelli (Mato Grosso do Sul) CENE (Rondônia) Vilhena; Bahia de Feira (Rio de Janeiro (state)) Resende	(Mato Grosso do Sul) Naviraiense (Federal District (Brazil)) Brasília (Acre (state)) Plácido de Castro (Paraná (state)) Londrina (Roraima) Náutico (Minas Gerais) Villa Nova (Piauí) Flamengo (Rio Grande do Norte) Potiguar (Piauí) Parnahyba; Sergipe	Maranhão (Pará) Paragominas (Goiás) Goianésia (Rio Grande do Sul) Lajeadense (São Paulo (state)) São Bernardo (Amapá) Santos (Rio de Janeiro (state)) Boavista (Acre (state)) Rio Branco / (Espírito Santo) Real Noroeste (Espírito Santo) Desportiva Ferroviária (Alagoas) Santa Rita	(Bahia) Juazeiro (Ceará) Barbalha (Minas Gerais) Caldense (Tocantins) Interporto (Sergipe) Lagarto (Rio Grande do Sul) Novo Hamburgo (Amazonas (Brazilian state)) Princesa do Solimões (Mato Grosso) Rondonópolis (Rio Grande do Sul) São Luiz (Minas Gerais) Tombense

== Preliminary round ==
Team 1	Agg.	Team 2	1st leg	2nd leg
Rio Branco (Acre (state))	2–1	(Espírito Santo) Real Noroeste	1–1	1–0

=== Preliminary match ===
February 19, 2014
20:30 UTC−3

Real Noroeste (Espírito Santo)	1–1	(Acre (state)) Rio Branco
Robert 70'	Report	Thiago 6'

Estádio José Olímpio da Rocha, Águia Branca
Attendance: 450
Referee: Igor Junio Benevenuto (Minas Gerais)

February 26, 2014
21:30 UTC−3

Rio Branco (Acre (state))	1–0	(Espírito Santo) Real Noroeste
Adriano Louzada 89'	Report

Arena da Floresta, Rio Branco
Attendance: 1,479
Referee: Edmar Campos da Encarnacao (Amazonas)

Rio Branco won 2–1 on aggregate.

== First round ==
Team 1	Agg.	Team 2	1st leg	2nd leg
Vasco da Gama (Rio de Janeiro (state))	1–0	(Rio de Janeiro (state)) Resende	0–0	1–0
Treze (Paraíba)	3–2	(Minas Gerais) Tombense	1–1	2–1
Ponte Preta (São Paulo (state))	4–1	(Roraima) Náutico	4–1	–
Paraná (Paraná (state))	4–2	(São Paulo (state)) São Bernardo	1–1	3–1
Vitória (Bahia)	2–2 (3–5 p)	(Paraná (state)) J. Malucelli	1–1	1–1
Joinville (Santa Catarina (state))	2–3	(Rio Grande do Sul) Novo Hamburgo	0–1	2–2
Atlético Goianiense (Goiás)	3–2	(Piauí) Flamengo	1–0	2–2
ABC (Rio Grande do Norte)	4–2	(Espírito Santo) Desportiva Ferroviária	0–1	4–1
Santos (São Paulo (state))	3–0	(Mato Grosso) Mixto	0–0	3–0
Brasiliense (Federal District (Brazil))	5–5 (a)	(Amazonas (Brazilian state)) Princesa do Solimões	1–3	4–2
Criciúma (Santa Catarina (state))	2–3	(Paraná (state)) Londrina	0–2	2–1
Grêmio Barueri (São Paulo (state))	2–2 (a)	(Goiás) Goianésia	2–2	0–0
Palmeiras (São Paulo (state))	3–0	(Rondônia) Vilhena	1–0	2–0
Sampaio Corrêa (Maranhão)	5–3	(Tocantins) Interporto	2–2	3–1
Avaí (Santa Catarina (state))	4–1	(Mato Grosso do Sul) Naviraiense	4–1	–
ASA (Alagoas)	4–0	(Pará) Paragominas	4–0	–
Fluminense (Rio de Janeiro (state))	6–3	(Ceará) Horizonte	1–3	5–0
Tupi (Minas Gerais)	2–0	(Bahia) Juazeiro	2–0	–
Náutico (Pernambuco)	1–1 (3–1 p)	Sergipe	0–1	1–0
América de Natal (Rio Grande do Norte)	4–1	(Rio de Janeiro (state)) Boavista	2–1	2–0
Corinthians (São Paulo (state))	2–0	Bahia de Feira	2–0	–
Nacional (Amazonas (Brazilian state))	4–3	(Rio Grande do Sul) São Luiz	2–2	2–1
Bahia	3–1	(Minas Gerais) Villa Nova	1–1	2–0
América Mineiro (Minas Gerais)	3–0	(Amapá) Santos	3–0	–
Goiás	0–2	(Paraíba) Botafogo	0–2	0–0
Santa Cruz (Pernambuco)	4–1	(Sergipe) Lagarto	1–0	3–1
Portuguesa (São Paulo (state))	2–2 (a)	(Rio Grande do Norte) Potiguar	0–1	2–1
Guarani (São Paulo (state))	1–2	(Alagoas) Santa Rita	0–0	1–2
São Paulo (São Paulo (state))	4–0	(Alagoas) CSA	1–0	3–0
CRB (Alagoas)	4–2	(Mato Grosso) Rondonópolis	2–2	2–0
Figueirense (Santa Catarina (state))	3–1	(Acre (state)) Plácido de Castro	0–0	3–1
Bragantino (São Paulo (state))	1–0	(Rio Grande do Sul) Lajeadense	0–0	1–0
Coritiba (Paraná (state))	4–2	(Mato Grosso do Sul) CENE	2–2	2–0
Duque de Caxias (Rio de Janeiro (state))	2–4	(Minas Gerais) Caldense	0–2	2–2
Sport (Pernambuco)	3–1	(Federal District (Brazil)) Brasília	3–1	–
Paysandu (Pará)	4–3	Maranhão	2–2	2–1
Internacional (Rio Grande do Sul)	6–1	(Pará) Remo	6–1	–
Cuiabá (Mato Grosso)	2–0	(Ceará) Barbalha	0–0	2–0
Ceará	5–1	(Piauí) Parnahyba	1–0	4–1
Chapecoense (Santa Catarina (state))	2–0	(Acre (state)) Rio Branco	2–0	–

== Second round ==
Team 1	Agg.	Team 2	1st leg	2nd leg
Vasco da Gama (Rio de Janeiro (state))	3–2	(Paraíba) Treze	2–1	1–1
Ponte Preta (São Paulo (state))	2–2 (8–7 p)	(Paraná (state)) Paraná	1–1	1–1
J. Malucelli (Paraná (state))	0–3	(Rio Grande do Sul) Novo Hamburgo	0–1	0–2
Atlético Goianiense (Goiás)	2–3	(Rio Grande do Norte) ABC	1–1	1–2
Santos (São Paulo (state))	6–3	(Amazonas (Brazilian state)) Princesa do Solimões	2–1	4–2
Grêmio Barueri (São Paulo (state))	3–3 (a)	(Paraná (state)) Londrina	0–0	3–3
Palmeiras (São Paulo (state))	4–2	(Maranhão) Sampaio Corrêa	1–2	3–0
Avaí (Santa Catarina (state))	4–4 (a)	(Alagoas) ASA	2–3	2–1
Fluminense (Rio de Janeiro (state))	3–0	(Minas Gerais) Tupi	3–0	–
Náutico (Pernambuco)	2–3	(Rio Grande do Norte) América de Natal	0–3	2–0
Corinthians (São Paulo (state))	3–0	(Amazonas (Brazilian state)) Nacional	3–0	–
Bahia	2–1	(Minas Gerais) América Mineiro	0–0	2–1
Santa Cruz (Pernambuco)	3–2	(Paraíba) Botafogo	1–1	2–1
Potiguar (Rio Grande do Norte)	2–7	(Alagoas) Santa Rita	0–2	2–5
São Paulo (São Paulo (state))	4–2	(Alagoas) CRB	1–2	3–0
Figueirense (Santa Catarina (state))	3–3 (3–4 p)	(São Paulo (state)) Bragantino	1–2	2–1
Coritiba (Paraná (state))	2–0	(Minas Gerais) Caldense	2–0	–
Sport (Pernambuco)	4–4 (a)	(Pará) Paysandu	1–2	3–2
Internacional (Rio Grande do Sul)	5–2	(Mato Grosso) Cuiabá	1–1	4–1
Ceará	3–2	(Santa Catarina (state)) Chapecoense	2–1	1–1

== Third round ==
Team 1	Agg.	Team 2	1st leg	2nd leg
Vasco da Gama (Rio de Janeiro (state))	4–1	(São Paulo (state)) Ponte Preta	2–0	2–1
Novo Hamburgo (Rio Grande do Sul)	2–1	(Rio Grande do Norte) ABC^{1}	0–1	2–0
Santos (São Paulo (state))	3–2	(Paraná (state)) Londrina	1−2	2−0
Palmeiras (São Paulo (state))	3–0	(Santa Catarina (state)) Avaí	2–0	1–0
Fluminense (Rio de Janeiro (state))	5–5 (a)	(Rio Grande do Norte) América de Natal	3–0	2–5
Bahia	1–3	(São Paulo (state)) Corinthians	0–3	1–0
Santa Cruz (Pernambuco)	3–4	(Alagoas) Santa Rita	2–3	1–1
São Paulo (São Paulo (state))	3–4	(São Paulo (state)) Bragantino	2–1	1–3
Paysandu (Pará)	2–3	(Paraná (state)) Coritiba	0−2	2−1
Ceará	5–2	(Rio Grande do Sul) Internacional	2–1	3–1

- Note 1: Novo Hamburgo won on aggregate but was disqualified by the STJD after being punished for fielding an ineligible player.

== Copa Sudamericana qualification ==
The best seven teams eliminated before the Round of 16 with the best 2013 Série A or 2013 Série B record (excluding those qualified for 2014 Copa Libertadores) qualified for 2014 Copa Sudamericana.

Pos	Team	Final status	2013 season
1	Vitória	Eliminated (first round)	5th (Série A)
2	Goiás	Eliminated (first round)	6th (Série A)
3	Santos	Round of 16	7th (Série A)
4	São Paulo	Eliminated (third round)	9th (Série A)
5	Corinthians	Round of 16	10th (Série A)
6	Coritiba	Round of 16	11th (Série A)
7	Bahia	Eliminated (third round)	12th (Série A)
8	Internacional	Eliminated (third round)	13th (Série A)
9	Criciúma	Eliminated (first round)	14th (Série A)
10	Fluminense	Eliminated (third round)	15th (Série A)
11	Palmeiras	Round of 16	1st (Série B)
12	Chapecoense	Eliminated (second round)	2nd (Série B)
13	Sport Recife ^{1}	Eliminated (second round)	3rd (Série B)
14	Figueirense	Eliminated (second round)	4th (Série B)
15	Portuguesa	Eliminated (first round)	17th (Série A)
16	Vasco da Gama	Round of 16	18th (Série A)
17	Ponte Preta	Eliminated (third round)	19th (Série A)
18	Náutico	Eliminated (second round)	20th (Série A)

^{1} Sport Recife is qualified as (Brazil 8) in the 2014 Copa Sudamericana, independently of qualifying position of the other seven teams.

Key to colors on the table
Qualified as the 2014 Copa do Nordeste champion
Qualified
Not qualified

== Knockout stages ==
A draw by CBF was held on August 18 to set the matches for this round. The 16 qualified teams were divided in two pots. Teams from pot 1 were the ones who competed at the 2014 Copa Libertadores plus the two highest CBF ranked teams qualified via the Third Round. Pot 2 was composed of the other teams that qualified through the Third Round. Each pot was divided into 4 pairs according to the CBF ranking. That division ensured that each team within a pair will not face each other before the finals, as they will be placed in opposite sides of the bracket. There was a draw to decide the home team of the round of 16. The following stages had other draws to determine the order of the matches as the tournament advanced.

=== Seeding ===
Pot 1	Pot 2
(Rio Grande do Sul) Grêmio (1); (São Paulo (state)) Corinthians (2); (Rio de Janeiro (state)) Flamengo (3); (Rio de Janeiro (state)) Vasco da Gama (4); (Minas Gerais) Cruzeiro (8); (Paraná (state)) Atlético Paranaense (10); (Rio de Janeiro (state)) Botafogo (12); (Minas Gerais) Atlético Mineiro (15)	(São Paulo (state)) Santos (9); (São Paulo (state)) Palmeiras (11); (Paraná (state)) Coritiba (14); Ceará (22); (Rio Grande do Norte) ABC (29); (São Paulo (state)) Bragantino (34); (Rio Grande do Norte) América de Natal (36); (Alagoas) Santa Rita (207)

=== Bracket ===
Round of 16
(Rio Grande do Norte) América-RN	3	0	3
(Paraná (state)) Atlético Paranaense	0	2	2
(Paraná (state)) Coritiba	3	0	3 (2)
(Rio de Janeiro (state)) Flamengo (pen.)	0	3	3 (3)
(São Paulo (state)) Bragantino	1	1	2
(São Paulo (state)) Corinthians	0	3	3
(São Paulo (state)) Palmeiras	0	0	0
(Minas Gerais) Atlético Mineiro	1	2	3
(Minas Gerais) Cruzeiro	5	2	7
(Alagoas) Santa Rita	0	1	1
(Rio de Janeiro (state)) Vasco da Gama	1	1	2
(Rio Grande do Norte) ABC	1	2	3
(Rio de Janeiro (state)) Botafogo (a)	1	4	5
Ceará	2	3	5
(Rio Grande do Sul) Grêmio	0	–	0
(São Paulo (state)) Santos	2	–	2

Quarterfinals
(Rio Grande do Norte) América-RN	0	0	0
(Rio de Janeiro (state)) Flamengo	1	1	2
(São Paulo (state)) Corinthians	2	1	3
(Minas Gerais) Atlético Mineiro	0	4	4
(Minas Gerais) Cruzeiro (a)	1	2	3
(Rio Grande do Norte) ABC	0	3	3
(Rio de Janeiro (state)) Botafogo	2	0	2
(São Paulo (state)) Santos	3	5	8

Semifinals
(Rio de Janeiro (state)) Flamengo	2	1	3
(Minas Gerais) Atlético Mineiro	0	4	4
(Minas Gerais) Cruzeiro	1	3	4
(São Paulo (state)) Santos	0	3	3

Finals
(Minas Gerais) Atlético Mineiro	2	1	3
(Minas Gerais) Cruzeiro	0	0	0

=== Round of 16 ===
Team 1	Agg.	Team 2	1st leg	2nd leg
Santos (São Paulo (state))	2–0	(Rio Grande do Sul) Grêmio	2–0	–^{1}
Ceará	5–5 (a)	(Rio de Janeiro (state)) Botafogo	2–1	3–4
Santa Rita (Alagoas)	1–7	(Minas Gerais) Cruzeiro	0–5	1–2
ABC (Rio Grande do Norte)	3–2	(Rio de Janeiro (state)) Vasco da Gama	1–1	2–1
Flamengo (Rio de Janeiro (state))	3–3 (3–2 p)	(Paraná (state)) Coritiba	0–3	3–0
Atlético Paranaense (Paraná (state))	2–3	(Rio Grande do Norte) América de Natal	0–3	2–0
Atlético Mineiro (Minas Gerais)	3–0	(São Paulo (state)) Palmeiras	1–0	2–0
Corinthians (São Paulo (state))	3–2	(São Paulo (state)) Bragantino	0–1	3–1

- Note 1: Due to racist chants against Santos' player Aranha by Grêmio fans in the first leg, the STJD suspended the second leg scheduled for September 3 and removed Grêmio from the tournament, thus automatically qualifying Santos to the next round.

=== Quarterfinals ===
Team 1	Agg.	Team 2	1st leg	2nd leg
Santos (São Paulo (state))	8–2	(Rio de Janeiro (state)) Botafogo	3–2	5–0
ABC (Rio Grande do Norte)	3–3 (a)	(Minas Gerais) Cruzeiro	0–1	3–2
Flamengo (Rio de Janeiro (state))	2–0	(Rio Grande do Norte) América de Natal	1–0	1–0
Atlético Mineiro (Minas Gerais)	4–3	(São Paulo (state)) Corinthians	0–2	4–1

=== Semifinals ===
Team 1	Agg.	Team 2	1st leg	2nd leg
Santos (São Paulo (state))	3–4	(Minas Gerais) Cruzeiro	0–1	3–3
Atlético Mineiro (Minas Gerais)	4–3	(Rio de Janeiro (state)) Flamengo	0–2	4–1

=== Finals ===
November 12, 2014
22:00 UTC−2

Atlético Mineiro (Minas Gerais)	2–0	(Minas Gerais) Cruzeiro
Luan 8'; Dátolo 58'	Report

Estádio Independência, Belo Horizonte
Attendance: 18,578
Referee: Marcelo de Lima Henrique (Rio de Janeiro)

November 26, 2014
22:00 UTC−2

Cruzeiro (Minas Gerais)	0–1	(Minas Gerais) Atlético Mineiro
	Report	Diego Tardelli 45+2'

Estádio Governador Magalhães Pinto (Mineirão), Belo Horizonte
Attendance: 39,786
Referee: Luiz Flávio de Oliveira (São Paulo)

2014 Copa do Brasil
Champions

Atlético Mineiro
1st title

== Top goalscorers ==
Rank	Player	Team	Goals
1	(Brazil) Bill	Ceará	6
1	(Brazil) Gabriel	(São Paulo (state)) Santos	6
3	(Brazil) Léo Gamalho	(Pernambuco) Santa Cruz	5
3	(Brazil) Luan	(Minas Gerais) Atlético Mineiro	5
3	(Brazil) Robinho	(São Paulo (state)) Santos	5
6	(Brazil) Abuda	(Alagoas) Santa Rita	4
6	(Brazil) Fred	(Rio de Janeiro (state)) Fluminense	4
6	(Brazil) Luiz Carlos	(Federal District (Brazil)) Brasiliense	4
6	(Brazil) Magno Alves	Ceará	4
6	(Bolivia) Marcelo Moreno	(Minas Gerais) Cruzeiro	4
6	(Brazil) Max	(Rio Grande do Norte) América-RN	4
6	(Brazil) Rafael Moura	(Rio Grande do Sul) Internacional	4
6	(Brazil) Willian	(Minas Gerais) Cruzeiro	4
