= Aranha (footballer, born 1980) =

Brazilian footballer (born 1980)

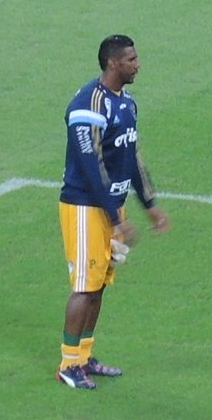
- Aranha with Palmeiras in 2015

Personal information
- Full name: Mario Lúcio Duarte Costa
- Date of birth: 17 November 1980 (age 45)
- Place of birth: Pouso Alegre, Brazil
- Height: 1.93 m (6 ft 4 in)
- Position: Goalkeeper

Youth career
- 1997–2000: Ponte Preta

Senior career*
Years	Team	Apps	(Gls)
2000–2009	Ponte Preta	52	(0)
2009–2011	Atlético Mineiro	31	(0)
2011–2014	Santos	111	(0)
2015	Palmeiras	2	(0)
2016	Joinville	5	(0)
2016–2017	Ponte Preta	74	(0)
2018	Avaí	34	(0)
- * Club domestic league appearances and goals as of 9 August 2020

Mário Lúcio Costa Duarte (born 17 November 1980), commonly known as Aranha, is a Brazilian writer and former professional footballer who played as a goalkeeper.

His professional playing career spanned nearly 20 years, during which he was mainly associated with Santos and Ponte Preta. After retirement, Aranha became a writer, focusing his work in the racial issues in Brazil. He published a book about José do Patrocínio in 2022.

== Club career ==
=== Ponte Preta ===
Born in Pouso Alegre, Minas Gerais, Aranha graduated from Ponte Preta's youth system. His nickname emerged in his hometown, through his coach at the time (Ailton Custódio), as a reference to the Soviet goalkeeper Lev Yashin, known as "Black Spider" due to his kits and his great defenses.

Aranha served his first six professional years mostly as a third-choice, behind Alexandre Negri and Lauro. After the former's transfer to AC Ajaccio in 2004, and the latter's move to Cruzeiro in 2006, he was still unable to appear regularly, due to the arrival of Jean.

In the following year Jean left the side and Aranha was chosen as first-choice. On 21 February 2007, in a 0–1 loss at Villa Nova, he suffered a serious face injury which sidelined him for a month; after his return he saw a fellow youth graduate, Denis, in great form and was thus relegated to the bench.

In 2008, Aranha was named best goalkeeper of the Campeonato Paulista, with his side eventually finishing second, losing to Palmeiras. Despite attracted interest from other clubs, he remained at Ponte, signing a new three-year deal on 19 December 2008.

=== Atlético Mineiro ===
On 26 May 2009, Aranha moved to Atlético Mineiro, after long negotiations. With Galo he only achieved mid-table positions, and despite appearing regularly in his first season, he served as a backup to young Renan Ribeiro during his second. He was released by the club on 17 December 2010.

=== Santos ===
Four days after being released by Galo, Aranha joined Santos. He served his first two seasons initially as a backup to Rafael Cabral, and extended his contract until the end of the 2013 season.

In July 2013, after the departure of Rafael to Napoli, Aranha was handed the first-choice goalkeeper status in the squad, and was later praised for his performances. On 31 August he signed a new two-year deal, remaining at Santos until 2015.

On 13 January 2015, after his deal expired, Aranha took legal action against Santos due to unpaid wages, the fifth player to do so. Eight days later, he rejected two proposals of rescision from Santos, preferring to wait for another decision from the court; he subsequently canceled his legal action against the club.

=== Palmeiras ===
On 2 February 2015, Aranha signed a one-year deal with fellow league team Palmeiras, mainly as a backup to Fernando Prass. He started only one match for the club, a 2-2 draw against Ituano on 9 April 2015, and became a free agent after his contract expired at the end of the year.

=== Joinville / Ponte Preta return ===
In June 2016, the 35-year-old Aranha signed a short-term deal with Campeonato Brasileiro Série B team Joinville. On 9 August, he returned to Ponte Preta.

== Racism incidents ==
On 28 August 2014, when Santos was facing Grêmio in Porto Alegre for the Round of 16 of the 2014 Copa do Brasil, Aranha was called macaco (monkey) by Grêmio supporters. He also accused them of making monkey sounds to provoke him. Grêmio later issued a statement in which the club condemns the acts of racism and promises to help identifying the racist supporters. The episode led to the return match against Grêmio being suspended until Brazil's superior sporting court can examine the case - the outcome could include Grêmio being disqualified from the championship, a punishment that was indeed made official on 3 September 2014.

On 21 January 2015, Aranha was again victim of racist acts, this time from a very small part of Santos' supporters, through a Facebook group. The people who insulted the player were reprimanded and subsequently excluded from the group.

== Career statistics ==
As of 4 September 2018

Club	Season	League			State League		Cup		Continental		Other		Total	
Club	Season	Division	Apps	Goals	Apps	Goals	Apps	Goals	Apps	Goals	Apps	Goals	Apps	Goals
Ponte Preta	2000	Série A	0	0	0	0	0	0	—		—		0	0
Ponte Preta	2001	Série A	0	0	0	0	0	0	—		—		0	0
Ponte Preta	2002	Série A	0	0	0	0	0	0	—		—		0	0
Ponte Preta	2003	Série A	0	0	0	0	0	0	—		—		0	0
Ponte Preta	2004	Série A	1	0	0	0	0	0	—		—		1	0
Ponte Preta	2005	Série A	3	0	0	0	0	0	—		—		3	0
Ponte Preta	2006	Série A	8	0	2	0	0	0	—		—		10	0
Ponte Preta	2007	Série B	5	0	14	0	2	0	—		—		21	0
Ponte Preta	2008	Série B	32	0	23	0	0	0	—		—		55	0
Ponte Preta	2009	Série B	3	0	20	0	8	0	—		—		31	0
Ponte Preta	Total		52	0	59	0	10	0	—		—		121	0
Atlético Mineiro	2009	Série A	12	0	—		7	0	—		—		19	0
Atlético Mineiro	2010	Série A	5	0	13	0	—		0	0	—		18	0
Atlético Mineiro	Total		17	0	13	0	7	0	0	0	—		37	0
Santos	2011	Série A	5	0	1	0	—		0	0	0	0	6	0
Santos	2012	Série A	13	0	10	0	—		0	0	—		23	0
Santos	2013	Série A	32	0	0	0	4	0	—		—		36	0
Santos	2014	Série A	33	0	17	0	7	0	—		—		57	0
Santos	Total		83	0	28	0	11	0	0	0	0	0	122	0
Palmeiras	2015	Série A	1	0	1	0	0	0	—		—		2	0
Joinville	2016	Série B	5	0	0	0	0	0	—		—		5	0
Ponte Preta	2016	Série A	19	0	0	0	2	0	—		—		21	0
Ponte Preta	2017	Série A	37	0	18	0	2	0	5 (Note: Appearance(s) in Copa Sudamericana)	0	—		62	0
Ponte Preta	Total		56	0	18	0	4	0	5	0	—		83	0
Avaí	2018	Série B	27	0	7	0	4	0	—		—		38	0
Career total			241	0	126	0	36	0	5	0	0	0	408	0

== Honours ==
=== Club ===
Santos

- Campeonato Paulista: 2011, 2012
- Copa Libertadores: 2011
- Recopa Sudamericana: 2012

Palmeiras

- Copa do Brasil: 2015

=== Individual ===
- Campeonato Paulista Team of the year: 2017
