= Ibirubá =

Municipality in the state of Rio Grande do Sul, Brazil

Coordinates: 28°38′S 53°06′W

- Municipality
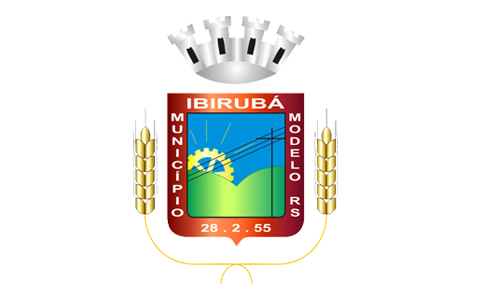
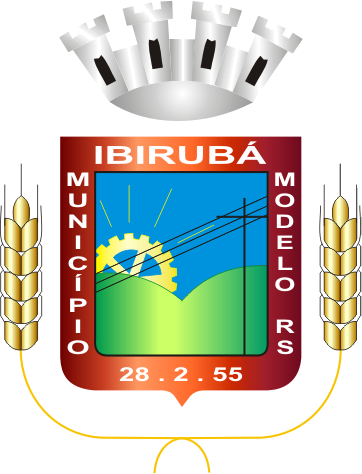
- Flag Coat of arms
- Interactive map of Ibirubá
- Country: Brazil
- Time zone: UTC−3 (BRT)

Ibirubá is a municipality in the state of Rio Grande do Sul, Brazil. As of 2020, the estimated population was 20,413.

== Geography ==
=== Climate ===
Climate data for Ibirubá (1981–2010)
| Month | Jan | Feb | Mar | Apr | May | Jun | Jul | Aug | Sep | Oct | Nov | Dec | Year |
|---|---|---|---|---|---|---|---|---|---|---|---|---|---|
| Mean daily maximum °C (°F) | 30.1 (86.2) | 28.9 (84.0) | 28.4 (83.1) | 25.8 (78.4) | 21.5 (70.7) | 19.5 (67.1) | 19.0 (66.2) | 21.2 (70.2) | 22.1 (71.8) | 25.3 (77.5) | 28.1 (82.6) | 30.0 (86.0) | 25.0 (77.0) |
| Daily mean °C (°F) | 23.5 (74.3) | 22.6 (72.7) | 21.6 (70.9) | 18.9 (66.0) | 15.3 (59.5) | 13.7 (56.7) | 13.0 (55.4) | 14.8 (58.6) | 15.7 (60.3) | 18.7 (65.7) | 21.2 (70.2) | 23.1 (73.6) | 18.5 (65.3) |
| Mean daily minimum °C (°F) | 18.0 (64.4) | 17.4 (63.3) | 16.1 (61.0) | 13.3 (55.9) | 10.4 (50.7) | 9.0 (48.2) | 8.2 (46.8) | 9.6 (49.3) | 10.5 (50.9) | 13.0 (55.4) | 15.1 (59.2) | 17.0 (62.6) | 13.1 (55.6) |
| Average precipitation mm (inches) | 152.8 (6.02) | 162.4 (6.39) | 112.1 (4.41) | 155.8 (6.13) | 116.7 (4.59) | 127.6 (5.02) | 166.1 (6.54) | 144.6 (5.69) | 166.7 (6.56) | 219.3 (8.63) | 153.6 (6.05) | 132.4 (5.21) | 1,810.1 (71.26) |
| Average precipitation days (≥ 1.0 mm) | 10 | 10 | 8 | 8 | 7 | 8 | 9 | 8 | 9 | 10 | 8 | 8 | 103 |
| Average relative humidity (%) | 74.1 | 78.4 | 77.0 | 76.5 | 80.3 | 82.8 | 82.0 | 78.7 | 77.9 | 76.0 | 69.5 | 69.4 | 76.9 |
Source: Instituto Nacional de Meteorologia

== See also ==
- List of municipalities in Rio Grande do Sul
