= Diego Dedoné =

Brazilian footballer (born 1985)

Personal information
- Full name: Diego Luiz Dedoné
- Date of birth: 12 September 1985 (age 41)
- Place of birth: Bandeirantes, Paraná, Brazil
- Height: 1.76 m (5 ft 9 in)
- Position: Striker

Youth career
- 2002–2005: União Bandeirante

Senior career*
Years	Team	Apps	(Gls)
2006–2008	União Bandeirante		
2006	→ Catanduvense (loan)		
2007	→ Toledo (loan)		
2007	→ Athletico Paranaense (loan)	0	(0)
2008	→ Toledo (loan)		
2009–2011	Guaratinguetá	46	(6)
2011	→ Red Bull Brasil (loan)	2	(0)
2011	São Bernardo FC	15	(1)
2012	Toledo	19	(8)
2012	Cianorte	12	(4)
2012	Oeste	2	(0)
2013	Cianorte	21	(1)
2013–2014	J. Malucelli	24	(3)
2014	Anapolina	2	(0)
2015	Cianorte	1	(0)
2015	São José-SP	4	(1)
2016	Velo Clube	9	(0)
- * Club domestic league appearances and goals

Diego Luiz Dedoné, sometimes known as just Diego (born 12 September 1985), is a Brazilian former footballer who played as a striker.

== Career ==
Having started his career at União Bandeirante, Dedoné stood out especially for Toledo in the 2007 Copa Paraná campaign, which earned him a three-month stint at Athletico Paranaense, where he never entered the field once.

On 21 May 2010, playing for Guaratinguetá in the 2–1 victory over Vila Nova, Dedoné suffered a violent kick to the head from teammate Everton while he attempted to block the ball from crossing the goal-line. Dedoné remained hospitalized until 28 May and stopped his career during one year.

The player resumed his career in May 2011 and later played for Toledo, Cianorte, Oeste, among others. In an interview, Dedoné admitted to being afraid of competing for balls with his head, due to a pin that he had to have implanted due to a fracture. He ended his career in 2016 at Velo Clube.
