= 2013 Campeonato Gaúcho =

Campeonato Gaúcho
- Season: 2013
- Champions: Internacional
- Relegated: Santa Cruz (RS); Cerâmica; Canoas
- Série D: Lajeadense
- Copa do Brasil: Internacional; Lajeadense; São Luiz
- Matches: 134
- Goals: 285 (2.13 per match)
- Top goalscorer: 9 goals: Diego Forlán (Internacional)

The 2013 Campeonato da Primeira Divisão de Futebol Profissional da FGF, better known as the 2013 Campeonato Gaúcho, was the 93rd season of Rio Grande do Sul's top-flight football league. The season began on 19 January and ended on 5 May.

== Format ==
The sixteen clubs were divided into two groups. In the first stage, called Taça Piratini 2013, teams played against teams from the other group. In the second stage, called Taça Farroupilha 2013, clubs play teams from their own group. In both stages, the top four teams from each group qualified to the play-offs. The winners of each stage play off for the overall title. The bottom three teams in the overall standings will be relegated.

== Teams ==
Club	Home city	Position in 2012
Canoas	Canoas	14th
Caxias	Caxias do Sul	2nd
Cerâmica	Gravataí	10th
Cruzeiro (RS)	Porto Alegre	12th
Esportivo	Bento Gonçalves	1st (2nd tier)
Grêmio	Porto Alegre	3rd
Internacional	Porto Alegre	1st
Juventude	Caxias do Sul	7th
Lajeadense	Lajeado	9th
Novo Hamburgo	Novo Hamburgo	5th
Passo Fundo	Passo Fundo	2nd (2nd tier)
Pelotas	Pelotas	13th
Santa Cruz (RS)	Santa Cruz do Sul	8th
São José	Porto Alegre	6th
São Luiz	Ijuí	11th
Veranópolis	Veranópolis	4th

== Taça Piratini ==
=== First stage ===
==== Group A standings ====
Pos	Team	Pld	W	D	L	GF	GA	GD	Pts	Qualification
1	Lajeadense (A)	8	5	3	0	11	3	+8	18	Advances to Quarterfinals
2	Caxias (A)	8	3	4	1	9	7	+2	13	Advances to Quarterfinals
3	Grêmio (A)	8	4	0	4	16	11	+5	12	Advances to Quarterfinals
4	Cerâmica (A)	8	3	3	2	6	4	+2	12	Advances to Quarterfinals
5	Cruzeiro-RS	8	2	4	2	5	6	−1	10	
6	Pelotas	8	3	0	5	5	10	−5	9	
7	Passo Fundo	8	2	2	4	7	9	−2	8	
8	Novo Hamburgo	8	1	2	5	7	13	−6	5	

Rules for classification: 1st points; 2nd wins; 3rd goal difference; 4th goals scored; 5th red cards received; 6th yellow cards received; 7th public draw
(A) Advance to a further round

==== Group B standings ====
Pos	Team	Pld	W	D	L	GF	GA	GD	Pts	Qualification
1	São Luiz (A)	8	5	2	1	10	3	+7	17	Advances to Quarterfinals
2	Internacional (A)	8	4	3	1	11	5	+6	15	Advances to Quarterfinals
3	São José (PA) (A)	8	4	2	2	7	6	+1	14	Advances to Quarterfinals
4	Esportivo (A)	8	4	1	3	9	8	+1	13	Advances to Quarterfinals
5	Juventude	8	2	5	1	6	6	0	11	
6	Santa Cruz-RS	8	2	1	5	10	16	−6	7	
7	Canoas	8	1	3	4	4	11	−7	6	
8	Veranópolis	8	1	1	6	6	11	−5	4	

Rules for classification: 1st points; 2nd wins; 3rd goal difference; 4th goals scored; 5th red cards received; 6th yellow cards received; 7th public draw
(A) Advance to a further round

=== Playoffs ===
Quarter-finals
B1	São Luiz	1
A4	Cerâmica	0
A2	Caxias	3
B3	São José (PA)	1
B2	Internacional	2
A3	Grêmio	1
A1	Lajeadense	1 (2)
B4	Esportivo	1 (4)

Semi-finals
B1	São Luiz	2
A2	Caxias	1
B2	Internacional	2
B4	Esportivo	0

Final
B1	São Luiz	0
B2	Internacional	5

== Taça Farroupilha ==
=== First stage ===
==== Group A standings ====
Pos	Team	Pld	W	D	L	GF	GA	GD	Pts	Qualification
1	Grêmio (A)	7	4	2	1	10	4	+6	14	Advances to Quarterfinals
2	Passo Fundo (A)	7	3	4	0	9	5	+4	13	Advances to Quarterfinals
3	Novo Hamburgo (A)	7	3	3	1	7	4	+3	12	Advances to Quarterfinals
4	Lajeadense (A)	7	2	4	1	6	6	0	10	Advances to Quarterfinals
5	Pelotas	7	2	3	2	8	9	−1	9	
6	Cruzeiro-RS	7	2	1	4	6	7	−1	7	
7	Caxias	7	2	1	4	5	10	−5	7	
8	Cerâmica	7	1	0	6	4	10	−6	3	

Updated to match(es) played on 10 April. Source:
Rules for classification: 1st points; 2nd wins; 3rd goal difference; 4th goals scored; 5th red cards received; 6th yellow cards received; 7th public draw
(A) Advance to a further round

==== Group B standings ====
Pos	Team	Pld	W	D	L	GF	GA	GD	Pts	Qualification
1	Internacional (A)	7	5	1	1	14	4	+10	16	Advances to Quarterfinals
2	Juventude (A)	7	4	2	1	13	8	+5	14	Advances to Quarterfinals
3	Veranópolis (A)	7	4	2	1	7	4	+3	14	Advances to Quarterfinals
4	São Luiz (A)	7	3	1	3	12	9	+3	10	Advances to Quarterfinals
5	Santa Cruz-RS	7	3	0	4	10	11	−1	9	
6	Esportivo	7	2	1	4	8	9	−1	7	
7	Canoas	7	1	2	4	6	15	−9	5	
8	São José (PA)	7	0	3	4	0	10	−10	3	

Rules for classification: 1st points; 2nd wins; 3rd goal difference; 4th goals scored; 5th red cards received; 6th yellow cards received; 7th public draw
(A) Advance to a further round

=== Playoffs ===
Quarter-finals
A1	Grêmio	0 (5)
B4	São Luiz	0 (3)
B2	Juventude	3
A3	Novo Hamburgo	2
B1	Internacional	2
A4	Lajeadense	1
A2	Passo Fundo	0 (2)
B3	Veranópolis	0 (4)

Semi-finals
A1	Grêmio	1 (4)
B2	Juventude	1 (5)
B1	Internacional	1
B3	Veranópolis	0

Final
A1	Internacional	0 (4)
B2	Juventude	0 (3)

== Tournament finals ==
Internacional won both Taças.

== Overall table ==
The overall table considers only the matches played during the first stage of both Taças and will define the two teams that will be relegated to play lower levels in 2014. The Taça Champions are placed on the top of the table. The best placed team not playing in Campeonato Brasileiro Série A (Grêmio, Internacional), B or C (Caxias) will be "promoted" to 2013 Campeonato Brasileiro Série D. The best three teams not qualified to 2014 Copa Libertadores will qualify for 2014 Copa do Brasil.

Pos	Team	Pld	W	D	L	GF	GA	GD	Pts	Qualification or relegation
1	Internacional (C)	15	9	4	2	25	9	+16	31	2014 Copa do Brasil
2	Lajeadense	15	7	7	1	17	9	+8	28	2014 Copa do Brasil and Série D
3	São Luiz	15	8	3	4	22	12	+10	27	2014 Copa do Brasil
4	Grêmio	15	8	2	5	26	15	+11	26	
5	Juventude	15	6	7	2	19	14	+5	25	
6	Passo Fundo	15	5	6	4	16	14	+2	21	
7	Esportivo	15	6	2	7	17	17	0	20	
8	Caxias	15	5	5	5	14	17	−3	20	
9	Veranópolis	15	5	3	7	13	15	−2	18	
10	Pelotas	15	5	3	7	13	19	−6	18	
11	Cruzeiro-RS	15	4	5	6	11	13	−2	17	
12	Novo Hamburgo	14	4	5	5	14	17	−3	17	
13	São José (PA)	15	4	5	6	7	16	−9	17	
14	Santa Cruz-RS (R)	15	5	1	9	20	27	−7	16	Relegation to 2014 Divisão de Acesso
15	Cerâmica (R)	15	4	3	8	10	14	−4	15	Relegation to 2014 Divisão de Acesso
16	Canoas (R)	15	2	5	8	10	26	−16	11	Relegation to 2014 Divisão de Acesso

Rules for classification: 1st points; 2nd wins; 3rd goal difference; 4th goals scored; 5th red cards received; 6th yellow cards received; 7th public draw
(C) Champions; (R) Relegated

== See also ==
- 2013 Copa FGF
