= Josinaldo Branco =

Brazilian footballer

Personal information
- Full name: Josinaldo Lima dos Santos
- Date of birth: 25 May 1985 (age 41)
- Place of birth: Boa Vista, Brazil
- Position: Forward

Team information
- Current team: Nacional–AM

Senior career*
Years	Team	Apps	(Gls)
2007	São Raimundo–AM		
2008	Holanda		
2008	São Raimundo–AM		
2009	Nacional–AM	4	(2)
2009	Manaus Compensão	0	(0)
2010	São Raimundo–PA	7	(3)
2011	Castanhal	0	(0)
2011	Náutico–RR	0	(0)
2011	Nacional–AM	3	(0)
2012	Águia de Marabá	15	(3)
2012–2013	Remo	0	(0)
2013	Náutico–RR	4	(3)
2014	Princesa do Solimões	10	(5)
2014	Tapajós	0	(0)
2015	Cametá	0	(0)
2016	Princesa do Solimões	0	(0)
2016	Trem	4	(1)
2016	Rio Negro	0	(0)
2017–	Nacional–AM	0	(0)
- * Club domestic league appearances and goals as of 1 February 2017

Josinaldo Lima dos Santos (born May 25, 1985), known as Josinaldo Branco or Branco, is a Brazilian footballer who plays as forward for Nacional–AM. He already played for national competitions such as Copa do Brasil, Campeonato Brasileiro Série D and Campeonato Brasileiro Série C.

== Career statistics ==
As of 1 February 2017

Club	Season	League			State League		Cup		Conmebol		Other		Total	
Club	Season	Division	Apps	Goals	Apps	Goals	Apps	Goals	Apps	Goals	Apps	Goals	Apps	Goals
São Raimundo–PA	2010	Série C	7	3	—		2	2	—		—		9	5
Nacional–AM	2011	Série D	3	0	—		—		—		—		3	0
Águia de Marabá	2012	Série C	15	3	—		—		—		—		15	3
Náutico–RR	2013	Série D	4	3	—		—		—		—		4	3
Princesa do Solimões	2014	Série D	10	5	11	5	4	2	—		1 (Note: All appearance(s) in Copa Verde)	0	26	12
Cametá	2015	Paraense	—		1	0	—		—		—		1	0
Princesa do Solimões	2016	Série D	—		—		1	0	—		—		1	0
Trem	2016	Série D	4	1	2	0	—		—		—		6	1
Rio Negro	2016	Amazonense	—		7	3	—		—		—		7	3
Nacional–AM	2017	Amazonense	—		—		—		—		1	0	1	0
Career total			43	15	21	8	7	4	0	0	2	0	73	27
