= Juba (footballer, born 1984) =

Brazilian footballer

Personal information
- Full name: Juberci Alves da Cruz
- Date of birth: 3 November 1984 (age 42)
- Place of birth: Ivaiporã, Brazil
- Height: 1.80 m (5 ft 11 in)
- Position: Forward

Senior career*
Years	Team	Apps	(Gls)
2007–2008	Aimoré	0	(0)
2008	São José-PR	0	(0)
2008	Flamengo-PI	0	(0)
2009	Panambi	0	(0)
2009–2012	Novo Hamburgo	0	(0)
2010	→ Panambi (loan)	0	(0)
2011	→ Brasil de Pelotas (loan)	7	(2)
2012	Caxias	9	(0)
2013	São Luiz	0	(0)
2013	Boa Esporte	13	(1)
2014	Veranópolis	0	(0)
2014	Novo Hamburgo	0	(0)
2014	→ Macaé (loan)	11	(2)
2015–2016	Operário-PR	34	(5)
2015	→ Criciúma (loan)	12	(1)
2015	→ Goiás (loan)	1	(0)
2016	→ Cuiabá (loan)	10	(1)
2017	Cuiabá	5	(0)
2018	Veranópolis	0	(0)
2018	Maringá	8	(0)
2019	Veranópolis	0	(0)
2019	Brasil de Pelotas	19	(1)
2020	Novo Hamburgo	0	(0)
- * Club domestic league appearances and goals as of 15:30, 17 June 2019 (UTC)

Juberci Alves da Cruz, commonly known as Juba, is a Brazilian footballer who plays as a forward.

Juba has played in all four divisions of the Brazilian national football pyramid. He played one match for Goiás in 2015 Campeonato Brasileiro Série A, and represented Criciúma in 2015 Campeonato Brasileiro Série B and Boa Esporte in 2013 Campeonato Brasileiro Série B.
