= Wanderson (footballer, born 1992) =

Brazilian footballer

Personal information
- Full name: Wanderson de Macedo Costa
- Date of birth: 31 May 1992 (age 34)
- Place of birth: Brazil
- Height: 1.85 m (6 ft 1 in)
- Position: Forward

Youth career
- Marília

Senior career*
Years	Team	Apps	(Gls)
2012	Rio Branco-PR	17	(2)
2013–2014	ASA	65	(27)
2015	Ponte Preta	7	(1)
2015	Paraná	6	(0)
2015–2016	Nacional	1	(0)
2016	Paysandu	4	(0)
2016	Salgueiro	4	(0)
2017	Botafogo-PB	8	(2)
2017	Gwangju FC	18	(8)
2018–2019	Jeonnam Dragons	26	(7)
- * Club domestic league appearances and goals as of 22:55, 7 May 2020 (UTC)

Wanderson de Macedo Costa (born 31 May 1992) is a Brazilian professional footballer who plays as a forward.
