= Rondonópolis Esporte Clube =

Brazilian football club

Rondonópolis
- Full name: Rondonópolis Esporte Clube
- Nickname(s): REC; Leão do Sul
- Founded: December 10, 2006 (18 years ago)
- Ground: Caldeirão, Rondonópolis, Mato Grosso state, Brazil
- Capacity: 19,000
| Home colors | Away colors | colors |

Rondonópolis Esporte Clube, commonly known as Rondonópolis, is a Brazilian football club based in Rondonópolis, Mato Grosso state.

== History ==
The club was founded on December 10, 2006. They regularly competes in the Campeonato Mato-Grossense since 2008. Rondonópolis won the Copa Governador do Mato Grosso in 2013.

== Achievements ==
- Copa Governador do Mato Grosso:
  - Winners (1): 2013

== Stadium ==
Rondonópolis Esporte Clube play their home games at Estádio Engenheiro Luthero Gomes, nicknamed Caldeirão. The stadium has a maximum capacity of 19,000 people.
