= Eliomar (footballer, born 1987) =

Brazilian footballer

Personal information
- Full name: Eliomar dos Santos Silva
- Date of birth: 12 February 1987 (age 39)
- Place of birth: Garanhuns, Brazil
- Height: 1.76 m (5 ft 9 in)
- Position: Forward

Team information
- Current team: Inter de Santa Maria

Youth career
- Petrolina
- Náutico

Senior career*
Years	Team	Apps	(Gls)
2005–2008	Náutico		
2007–2008	→ Međimurje (loan)	29	(6)
2008–2010	Međimurje	51	(13)
2010–2011	Istra 1961	11	(1)
2011	Guarany de Sobral	7	(2)
2012	Chapecoense	31	(10)
2013	Figueirense	14	(1)
2013–2014	Novo Hamburgo	12	(4)
2014	Icasa	5	(0)
2015	Operário Ferroviário	5	(0)
2015–2017	Brusque	50	(11)
2016	→ Marcílio Dias (loan)	8	(2)
2017	Joinville	13	(2)
2018	Uberlândia	10	(1)
2019	Caxias	17	(1)
2019–2020	Tubarão	21	(3)
2020	Brusque	13	(0)
2021	Novo Hamburgo	5	(0)
2021–2022	União Frederiquense	28	(8)
2022	Pelotas	13	(1)
2022	Moto Club	6	(0)
2022–	Inter de Santa Maria	0	(0)
- * Club domestic league appearances and goals as of 18:56, 9 October 2022 (UTC)

Eliomar dos Santos Silva (born 12 February 1987) is a Brazilian footballer who plays as a forward for Inter de Santa Maria.

== Career ==
Eliomar was born in Garanhuns. He signed a two-year contract with Clube Náutico Capibaribe in April 2005, and went on to sign a two-year contract extension on 16 May 2007. On 13 July 2007, however, he was signed by NK Međimurje of the Croatian First League.

He scored 6 goals in 29 matches during his debut season in the Croatian First League in 2007–08, at the end of which the club were relegated to the Croatian Second League. In the Second League, he scored 10 times in 22 matches as the club won promotion back to the First League for the 2009–10 season. Unfortunately, NK Međimurje was able to stay in Croatian First League only one season. After they were relegated, Eliomar left the club and joined NK Istra 1961 from Pula.

In 2011, he returned to Brazil and signed with Guarany Sporting Club.
