= Eduardo Teixeira =

Eduardo Teixeira may refer to:

- Eduardo Teixeira Coelho (1919–2005), Portuguese comic book artist
- Eduardo V. Teixeira, Brazilian mathematician
- Eduardo Teixeira (footballer) (born 1993), Brazilian footballer
- Eduardo Teixeira (politician), Portuguese economist and politician
