= Frasqueirão =

Multi-purpose stadium in Natal, Brazil

Coordinates: 5.8894°S 35.1801°W

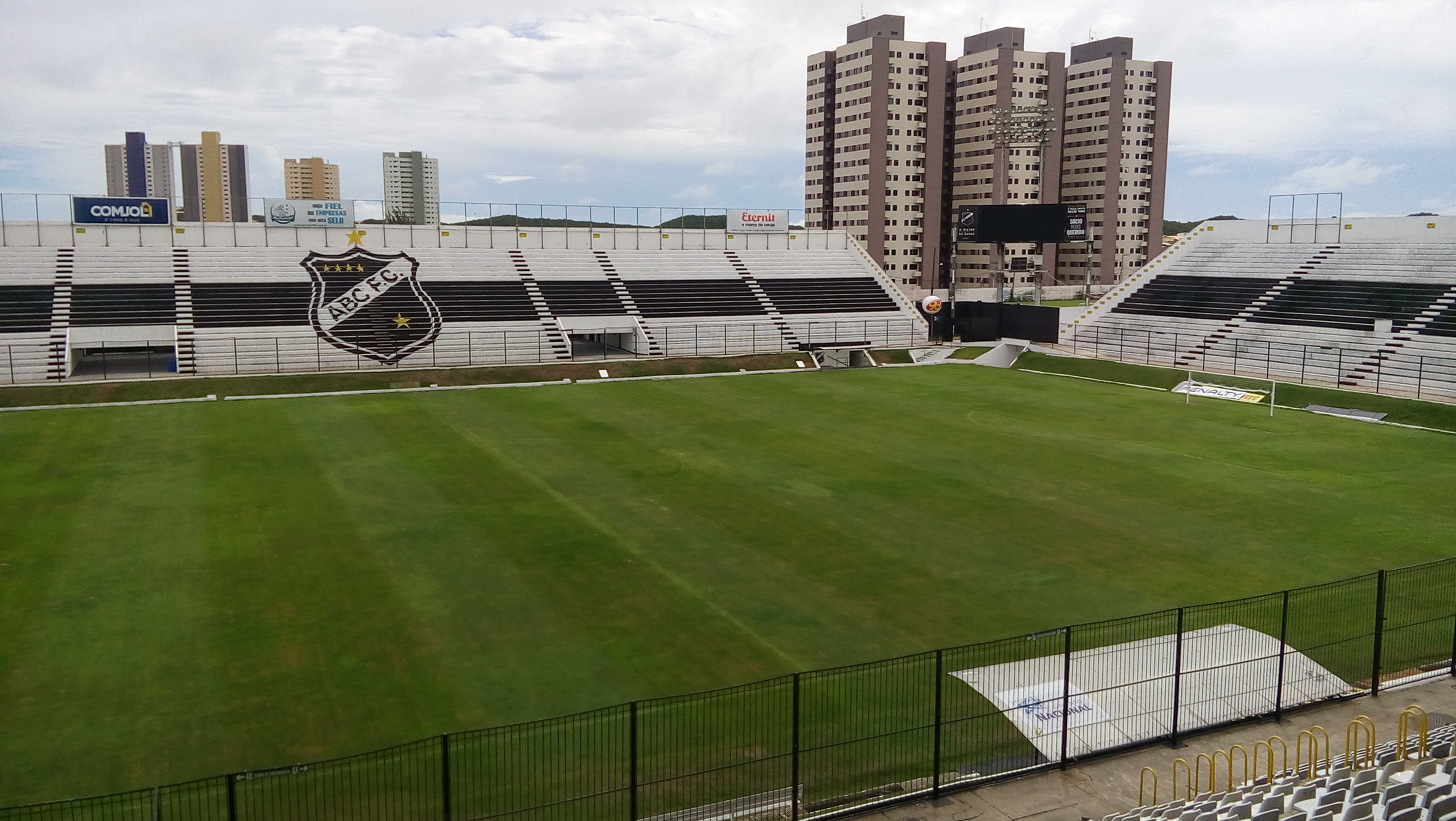
- Sisbrace
- Interactive map of Frasqueirão
- Full name: Estádio Maria Lamas Farache
- Location: Natal, Rio Grande do Norte, Brazil
- Owner: ABC Futebol Clube
- Capacity: 18,000
- Surface: Grass

Construction
- Opened: 2006

Tenant
- ABC Futebol Clube

Estádio Maria Lamas Farache, usually known as Frasqueirão is a multi-purpose stadium in the Brazilian city of Natal, Rio Grande do Norte. It is currently used mostly for football matches. The stadium has an initial capacity of 18,000 people and will be expanded to 24,000 spectators.

Estádio Frasqueirão is owned by ABC Futebol Clube. The stadium is named after Maria Lamas Farache, who was the wife of ABC's former chairman Vicente Farache.

== History ==
In 2006, the works on Frasqueirão were completed, costing R$ 12 million (R$ 210 thousand were donated by the Rio Grande do Norte State Government to be used to build the football field). The inaugural match was played on January 22 of that year, when ABC and Alecrim drew 1-1. The first goal of the stadium was scored by Alecrim's da Cunha.
