= Max (footballer, born 1983) =

Brazilian footballer

Personal information
- Full name: Max Brendon Costa Pinheiro
- Date of birth: 10 July 1983 (age 43)
- Place of birth: São Luís, Brazil
- Height: 1.88 m (6 ft 2 in)
- Position: Forward

Senior career*
Years	Team	Apps	(Gls)
2004–2005	Tocantinópolis		
2006–2007	Corinthians-AL		
2007	→ América-RN (loan)		
2007	→ Palmeiras (loan)	13	(1)
2008–2010	Palmeiras		
2009	→ América-RN (loan)	19	(3)
2009	→ Paraná (loan)	0	(0)
2010	→ Paulista (loan)	0	(0)
2010	→ Náutico (loan)	5	(1)
2011	Boavista	0	(0)
2011	América-RN	12	(5)
2012	Caldense	0	(0)
2012–2015	América-RN	56	(18)
2016	Guarani	0	(0)
2016	Sampaio Corrêa	8	(1)
2017	Cabofriense	0	(0)
2017	Inter de Lages	0	(0)
2017	→ Tombense (loan)	14	(8)
2018	Inter de Lages	0	(0)
2018	Globo	13	(5)
2019	América-RN	8	(5)
2019	Globo	5	(1)
2020	Cabofriense	0	(0)
2020	Ríver	12	(5)
2021	Interporto		
2021	Tocantins		
2021	UNIRB	3	(1)
2021	Santa Cruz de Natal	4	(3)
2021	América-RN	6	(2)
- * Club domestic league appearances and goals

Max Brendon Costa Pinheiro or simply Max (born 10 July 1983), is a Brazilian former football forward.

== Honours ==
Palmeiras

- Campeonato Paulista 2008
