= 2018 Clube do Remo season =

2018 season of Brazilian association football team

Remo
2018 season
- President: Manoel Ribeiro
- Coach: Ney da Matta (until 26 February 2018); Givanildo Oliveira (until 28 May 2018); Artur Oliveira (until 26 June 2018); João Nasser
- Stadium: Mangueirão
- Campeonato Brasileiro Série C: 13th
- Campeonato Paraense: 1st
- Copa Verde: Round of 16
- Copa do Brasil: Second round
- Highest home attendance: 30,860 (vs. Bragantino-PA, 14 January 2018)
- Lowest home attendance: 1,708 (vs. Independente, 28 February 2018)
Home colors	Away colors	Third colors

The 2018 season was Remo's 105th year existence. The club participated in the Campeonato Brasileiro Série C, the Campeonato Paraense, the Copa Verde and the Copa do Brasil.

Remo finished outside of the top four of the Campeonato Brasileiro Série C (6th place in the group stage and 13th overall), but they won the Campeonato Paraense by the 45th time. In the Copa Verde, the club was eliminated in the round of 16 by Manaus with an aggregate score of 3-1. In the Copa do Brasil, Remo ended in the second round by Internacional.

== Players ==
=== Squad information ===
Numbers in parentheses denote appearances as substitute.

As of 11 August 2018

Position	Nat.	Name	Date of Birth (Age)		
Position	Nat.	Name	Date of Birth (Age)	Apps	Goals
GK	BRA	Vinícius	9 November 1984 (aged 33)	35	0
GK	BRA	Douglas Dias	13 October 1987 (aged 30)	1	0
GK	BRA	Evandro Gigante	15 November 1985 (aged 32)	0 (1)	0
DF	BRA	Bruno Maia	19 April 1988 (aged 30)	29	0
DF	BRA	Mimica	22 November 1985 (aged 32)	32	3
DF	BRA	Moisés	7 October 1992 (aged 25)	6	1
DF	BRA	Romário	2 December 1989 (aged 28)	2 (1)	0
DF	BRA	Kevem	3 March 2000 (aged 18)	0 (1)	0
DF	BRA	Levy	22 July 1988 (aged 30)	18 (2)	1
DF	BRA	Nininho	7 February 1992 (aged 26)	10 (1)	1
DF	BRA	Bruno Limão	13 August 1989 (aged 28)	1	0
DF	BRA	Esquerdinha	9 April 1984 (aged 34)	26 (1)	1
DF	BRA	Jefferson Recife	13 June 1993 (aged 25)	6 (11)	1
MF	BRA	Dudu	26 October 1986 (aged 31)	21 (5)	1
MF	BRA	Dedeco	7 January 1989 (aged 29)	7 (2)	2
MF	BRA	Vacaria	4 April 1994 (aged 24)	4 (1)	0
MF	BRA	Keoma	14 October 1991 (aged 26)	1 (1)	0
MF	BRA	Fernandes	24 April 1985 (aged 33)	16 (5)	0
MF	BRA	Geandro	26 November 1987 (aged 30)	12 (5)	0
MF	BRA	Leandro Brasília	21 January 1987 (aged 31)	18 (3)	0
MF	BRA	Miguel	28 August 1997 (aged 20)	1	0
MF	BRA	Dudu Pacheco	1 February 1997 (aged 21)	0 (3)	0
MF	BRA	Rodriguinho	24 November 1987 (aged 30)	14 (8)	3
FW	BRA	Gabriel Lima	27 October 1996 (aged 21)	4 (6)	4
FW	BRA	Jayme	20 March 1993 (aged 25)	7 (11)	3
FW	BRA	Elielton	7 November 1992 (aged 25)	20 (8)	5
FW	BRA	Ruan	17 August 1993 (aged 24)	2 (2)	0
FW	BRA	Isac	8 June 1985 (aged 33)	26 (3)	10
FW	BRA	Eliandro	23 April 1990 (aged 28)	5 (3)	0
Players left the club during the playing season
DF	BRA	Alex Moraes	25 March 1988 (aged 29)	0	0
DF	BRA	Martony	14 August 1987 (aged 30)	5 (1)	0
DF	BRA	Gustavo	2 September 1999 (aged 18)	5 (5)	0
DF	BRA	Diego Superti	8 October 1995 (aged 22)	0	0
MF	BRA	Yuri	29 March 1996 (aged 22)	1 (1)	0
MF	BRA	Felipe Recife	29 September 1991 (aged 26)	10 (2)	0
MF	BRA	Andrey	18 March 1996 (aged 22)	1 (3)	0
MF	BRA	Adenílson	9 March 1992 (aged 26)	16 (5)	3
MF	BRA	Everton	8 August 1984 (aged 33)	9 (1)	0
MF	BRA	Rafael Bastos	1 January 1985 (aged 33)	3 (2)	0
FW	BRA	Felipe Pará	14 April 1995 (aged 22)	0 (1)	0
FW	BRA	Felipe Marques	27 January 1990 (aged 28)	19 (2)	5
FW	BRA	Marcelo	29 August 1995 (aged 22)	3	0

=== Top scorers ===
As of 11 August 2018

Place	Position	Name	Campeonato Brasileiro Série C	Campeonato Paraense	Copa Verde	Copa do Brasil	Total
1	FW	Isac	3	6	0	1	10
2	FW	Elielton	1	4	0	0	5
2	FW	Felipe Marques	0	3	0	2	5
4	FW	Gabriel Lima	4	0	0	0	4
5	FW	Jayme	2	1	0	0	3
5	MF	Rodriguinho	2	1	0	0	3
5	MF	Adenílson	0	3	0	0	3
5	DF	Mimica	1	1	1	0	3
9	MF	Dedeco	2	0	0	0	2
10	MF	Dudu	0	1	0	0	1
10	DF	Esquerdinha	1	0	0	0	1
10	DF	Nininho	1	0	0	0	1
10	DF	Levy	0	1	0	0	1
10	DF	Jefferson Recife	0	1	0	0	1
10	DF	Moisés	1	0	0	0	1

=== Disciplinary record ===
As of 11 August 2018

Position	Name	Campeonato Brasileiro Série C		Campeonato Paraense		Copa Verde		Copa do Brasil		Total	
Position	Name	Booked	Sent off (straight red)	Booked	Sent off (straight red)	Booked	Sent off (straight red)	Booked	Sent off (straight red)	Booked	Sent off (straight red)
DF	Bruno Maia	7	1	2	0	0	0	1	0	10	1
MF	Geandro	3	1	2	0	0	0	1	0	6	1
FW	Isac	2	0	2	1	1	0	0	0	5	1
MF	Vacaria	3	1	0	0	0	0	0	0	3	1
MF	Yuri	0	0	3	1	0	0	0	0	3	1
DF	Esquerdinha	3	0	5	0	1	0	0	0	9	0
DF	Levy	1	0	4	0	1	0	1	0	7	0
DF	Mimica	2	0	2	0	1	0	1	0	6	0
FW	Elielton	2	0	3	0	0	0	0	0	5	0
MF	Adenílson	1	0	2	0	1	0	1	0	5	0
MF	Leandro Brasília	3	0	1	0	0	0	0	0	4	0
MF	Rodriguinho	1	0	2	0	1	0	0	0	4	0
MF	Dudu	2	0	2	0	0	0	0	0	4	0
MF	Felipe Recife	0	0	2	0	0	0	2	0	4	0
FW	Gabriel Lima	3	0	0	0	0	0	0	0	3	0
MF	Fernandes	2	0	1	0	0	0	0	0	3	0
DF	Gustavo	0	0	3	0	0	0	0	0	3	0
MF	Everton	3	0	0	0	0	0	0	0	3	0
DF	Nininho	2	0	0	0	0	0	0	0	2	0
DF	Moisés	2	0	0	0	0	0	0	0	2	0
GK	Vinícius	0	0	1	0	0	0	1	0	2	0
DF	Martony	0	0	1	0	0	0	0	0	1	0
MF	Dedeco	1	0	0	0	0	0	0	0	1	0
FW	Eliandro	1	0	0	0	0	0	0	0	1	0
FW	Jayme	1	0	0	0	0	0	0	0	1	0
FW	Felipe Marques	0	0	1	0	0	0	0	0	1	0
GK	Douglas Dias	1	0	0	0	0	0	0	0	1	0
	TOTALS	46	3	39	2	6	0	8	0	99	5

== Kit ==
Supplier: Topper / Main sponsor: Drogarias Globo

Home	Home alt. 1	Home alt. 2	Away	Away alt. 1	Third

== Transfers ==
=== Transfers in ===
Position	Name	From	Source
DF	Esquerdinha	(Brazil) Sampaio Corrêa	
MF	Felipe Recife	(Brazil) Camboriú	
GK	Douglas Dias	(Brazil) Cuiabá	
MF	Fernandes	(Brazil) Botafogo-PB	
DF	Bruno Maia	(Brazil) Botafogo-PB	
MF	Geandro	(Brazil) Boa Esporte	
FW	Elielton	(Brazil) Tapajós	
DF	Mimica	(Brazil) Confiança	
MF	Leandro Brasília	(Brazil) Tupi	
FW	Felipe Marques	(Brazil) Sampaio Corrêa	
DF	Alex Moraes	(Brazil) Brusque	
DF	Jefferson Recife	(Brazil) Sampaio Corrêa	
MF	Adenílson	(Brazil) Fortaleza (loan)	
MF	Rodriguinho	(South Korea) Daegu	
MF	Yuri	(Brazil) Atlético Mineiro	
DF	Diego Superti	(Brazil) Cruzeiro-RS	
MF	Andrey	(Brazil) Cruzeiro (loan)	
FW	Isac	(Brazil) Sampaio Corrêa	
FW	Marcelo	Free agent	
FW	Felipe Pará	Free agent	
DF	Moisés	(Brazil) São Raimundo-PA	
MF	Dedeco	(Brazil) Castanhal	
MF	Everton	(Brazil) Novorizontino	
FW	Eliandro	(Brazil) Ferroviária	
DF	Nininho	(Brazil) Red Bull Brasil	
MF	Rafael Bastos	(Brazil) CRB	
FW	Ruan	(Brazil) CRB (loan)	
MF	Dudu Pacheco	(Brazil) Vila Nova (loan)	
MF	Vacaria	(Brazil) Juventude (loan)	
MF	Keoma	(Brazil) São Raimundo-PA	
DF	Bruno Limão	(Brazil) Independente-PA	
DF	Romário	(Brazil) Macapá	

=== Transfers out ===
Position	Name	To	Source
DF	Alex Moraes	(Malaysia) Pahang	
DF	Diego Superti	Free agent	
MF	Yuri	Free agent	
MF	Felipe Recife	(Brazil) CRAC	
FW	Felipe Pará	Free agent	
FW	Felipe Marques	(Brazil) Londrina	
DF	Martony	Free agent	
MF	Andrey	Free agent	
MF	Adenílson	Free agent	
MF	Rafael Bastos	Free agent	
DF	Gustavo	(Brazil) Cruzeiro	
MF	Everton	(Brazil) Red Bull Brasil	

Notes

1. Felipe Recife joined CRAC following his release.
2. Everton joined Red Bull Brasil following his release.

== Competitions ==
Competition	First match	Last match	Starting round	Final position	Record							
Competition	First match	Last match	Starting round	Final position	Pld	W	D	L	GF	GA	GD	Win %
Campeonato Brasileiro Série C	16 April 2018	11 August 2018	Group stage	13th	18	6	4	8	18	20	−2	33.33
Campeonato Paraense	14 January 2018	8 April 2018	Group stage	Winners	14	10	1	3	22	11	+11	71.43
Copa Verde	31 January 2018	14 February 2018	Round of 16	Round of 16	2	0	1	1	1	3	−2	0.00
Copa do Brasil	7 February 2018	21 February 2018	First round	Second round	2	1	0	1	3	2	+1	50.00
Total					36	17	6	13	44	36	+8	47.22

Source: Competitions

=== Campeonato Brasileiro Série C ===
==== Group stage ====
Pos	Team	Pld	W	D	L	GF	GA	GD	Pts	Qualification or relegation
4	Botafogo-PB	18	6	8	4	22	17	+5	26	Advance to Final stages
5	Confiança	18	5	8	5	24	25	−1	23	
6	Remo	18	6	4	8	18	20	−2	22	
7	Globo	18	4	10	4	19	19	0	22	
8	ABC	18	6	3	9	18	24	−6	21	

Source: CBF

===== Matches =====
16 April 2018 1	Atlético Acreano	1–0	Remo	Rio Branco
21:15 UTC−3	Eduardo 41'	Report	Elielton (yellow card) 8'	Stadium: Arena da Floresta; Attendance: 862; Referee: Ivan da Silva Guimarães Júnior

21 April 2018 2	Remo	1–0	Globo	Belém
16:00 UTC−3	Isac 28' (pen.); Moisés (yellow card) 30'; Levy (yellow card) 51'; Esquerdinha (yellow card) 69'; Leandro Brasília (yellow card) 73'	Report	Wellington Lima (yellow card) 28'; Victor (yellow card) 30'; Galiardo (yellow card) 40'	Stadium: Mangueirão; Attendance: 6,542; Referee: Célio Amorim

28 April 2018 3	Juazeirense	1–0	Remo	Juazeiro
19:00 UTC−3	Waguinho (yellow card) 11'; Emílio (yellow card) 33'; Rayllan 47'; Tigre (yellow card) 88'	Report	Bruno Maia (yellow card) 31' (yellow-red card) 83'	Stadium: Estádio Adauto Moraes; Attendance: 299; Referee: Adriano Milczvski

5 May 2018 4	Remo	0–0	Santa Cruz	Belém
16:00 UTC−3	Adenílson (yellow card) 87'	Report	Eduardo Brito (yellow card) 73'	Stadium: Mangueirão; Attendance: 6,357; Referee: José Mendonça da Silva Júnior

13 May 2018 5	Botafogo-PB	1–3	Remo	João Pessoa
19:00 UTC−3	Mário Sérgio 27'; Wálber (yellow card) 30'; Allan Dias (yellow card) 37'; Rogério (yellow card) 52'; Rafael Jataí (yellow card) 71' (yellow-red card) 90'	Report	Dudu (yellow card) 25'; Esquerdinha (yellow card) 37'; Mimica 39'; Elielton (yellow card) 58'; Jayme 66'; Douglas Dias (yellow card) 73'; Gabriel Lima 78'; Everton (yellow card) 88'	Stadium: Almeidão; Attendance: 4,595; Referee: William Machado Steffen

20 May 2018 6	Remo	0–3	Confiança	Belém
19:00 UTC−3	Dudu (yellow card) 52'; Isac (yellow card) 57'; Everton (yellow card) 79'	Report	Ângelo (yellow card) 51'; Léo Ceará 70'; Everton 82'; Rafael Silva (yellow card) 83'; Bruno Maia 90+3' (o.g.)	Stadium: Mangueirão; Attendance: 11,698; Referee: Jefferson Ferreira de Moraes

26 May 2018 7	ABC	2–1	Remo	Natal
20:00 UTC−3	Higor Leite (yellow card) 51'; Danrlei (yellow card) 53'; Luan 60'; Felipe Guedes (yellow card) 69'; Matheus Carvalho 72'	Report	Jayme (yellow card) 52'; Everton (yellow card) 54'; Bruno Maia (yellow card) 81'; Moisés 82'	Stadium: Frasqueirão; Attendance: 3,808; Referee: Alinor Silva da Paixão

3 June 2018 8	Remo	0–1	Salgueiro	Belém
19:00 UTC−3	Isac (yellow card) 27'; Bruno Maia (yellow card) 45+2'	Report	Emerson 23'; Iury (yellow card) 53'	Stadium: Mangueirão; Attendance: 7,441; Referee: Roger Goulart

9 June 2018 9	Náutico	3–2	Remo	São Lourenço da Mata
16:00 UTC−3	Jobson (yellow card) 39'; Robinho 48'; Jhonnatan 81'; Wallace Pernambucano 87' (pen.)	Report	Leandro Brasília (yellow card) 26'; Mimica (yellow card) 29'; Esquerdinha 52'; Nininho (yellow card) 68'; Elielton 90+3'	Stadium: Arena Pernambuco; Attendance: 2,644; Referee: Salim Fende Chavez

18 June 2018 10	Remo	2–2	Atlético Acreano	Belém
19:00 UTC−3	Rodriguinho 26'; Leandro Brasília (yellow card) 37'; Nininho 53'; Geandro (yellow card) 67'	Report	Leandro (yellow card) 20'; Neto Pessoa 35', (yellow card) 37'; Rafael Barros 48'; Eduardo (yellow card) 64'; Diego Alberto (yellow card) 82'	Stadium: Mangueirão; Attendance: 4,347; Referee: Pathrice Wallace Corrêa Maia

24 June 2018 11	Globo	3–1	Remo	Ceará-Mirim
18:00 UTC−3	Alexandre 21', (yellow card) 90'; Carlos Alexandre (yellow card) 24'; Renatinho Potiguar (yellow card) 32', (goal) 62'; Max (yellow card) 65' (yellow-red card) 90+4' (goal) 73'; Jean Natal (yellow card) 90+9'	Report	Isac 14'; Geandro (yellow card) 25'; Mimica (yellow card) 33'; Bruno Maia (yellow card) 73'; Esquerdinha (yellow card) 90+9'	Stadium: Barrettão; Attendance: 281; Referee: Marco Aurélio Augusto Fazekas Ferreira

29 June 2018 12	Remo	3–0	Juazeirense	Belém
21:45 UTC−3	Isac 15'; Moisés (yellow card) 33'; Rodriguinho 41', (yellow card) 74'; Gabriel Lima 69', (yellow card) 70'	Report	Eron (yellow card) 16'; Waguinho (yellow card) 19'; Júnior Gaúcho (yellow card) 54'; Carlinhos (yellow card) 72'; Jussimar (yellow card) 82'	Stadium: Mangueirão; Attendance: 3,063; Referee: João Batista de Arruda

8 July 2018 13	Santa Cruz	2–0	Remo	Recife
17:00 UTC−3	Pipico 11'; Arthur Rezende (yellow card) 39'; Charles 89'	Report	Bruno Maia (yellow card) 10'; Nininho (yellow card) 24'; Geandro (yellow card) 78', (red card) 90+5'; Vacaria (red card) 90+2'	Stadium: Estádio do Arruda; Attendance: 14,782; Referee: Rodrigo Nunes de Sá

14 July 2018 14	Remo	0–0	Botafogo-PB	Belém
17:00 UTC−3	Gabriel Lima (yellow card) 89'	Report	Rafael Jataí (yellow card) 41'; Gladstone (yellow card) 44'; Gedeílson (yellow card) 77'; Júnior Lopes (yellow card) 87'	Stadium: Mangueirão; Attendance: 4,898; Referee: Vinícius Gonçalves Dias Araújo

22 July 2018 15	Confiança	0–2	Remo	Aracaju
19:00 UTC−3	Renato Camilo (yellow card) 42'	Report	Gabriel Lima 7', 35'; Fernandes (yellow card) 59'; Bruno Maia (yellow card) 75'	Stadium: Batistão; Attendance: 2,858; Referee: Bruno Rezende Silva

29 July 2018 16	Remo	1–0	ABC	Belém
19:00 UTC−3	Vacaria (yellow card) 47'; Gabriel Lima (yellow card) 70'; Dedeco 86'	Report	Felipe Guedes (yellow card) 69'; Vinícius (yellow card) 70'	Stadium: Mangueirão; Attendance: 11,321; Referee: Ricardo Marques

6 August 2018 17	Salgueiro	0–1	Remo	Salgueiro
21:15 UTC−3	Erinaldo (yellow card) 35'; Mondragon (yellow card) 70'; Alexon (yellow card) 84'; Izaldo (yellow card) 85'; Emerson (red card) 90+1'	Report	Fernandes (yellow card) 32'; Eliandro (yellow card) 42'; Vacaria (yellow card) 55'; Jayme 62'; Dedeco (yellow card) 83'	Stadium: Estádio Cornélio de Barros; Attendance: 886; Referee: Leandro Bizzio Marinho

11 August 2018 18	Remo	1–1	Náutico	Belém
19:30 UTC−3	Dedeco 5'; Vacaria (yellow card) 30'	Report	Jiménez 23', (yellow card) 34'; Thiago Ennes (yellow card) 37'; Jhonnatan (yellow card) 66'	Stadium: Mangueirão; Attendance: 19,371; Referee: Jean Pierre Gonçalves Lima

=== Campeonato Paraense ===
==== Group stage ====
Pos	Team	Pld	W	D	L	GF	GA	GD	Pts	Qualification or relegation
1	Remo (A)	10	7	1	2	17	9	+8	22	Qualifies to the semi-finals
2	São Raimundo (A)	10	5	1	4	15	12	+3	16	Qualifies to the semi-finals
3	Castanhal	10	4	1	5	16	17	−1	13	
4	Paragominas	10	2	5	3	12	12	0	11	
5	Parauapebas (R)	10	1	5	4	9	13	−4	8	2019 Paraense 2nd Division

(A) Advance to a further round; (R) Relegated

===== Matches =====
14 January 2018 1	Remo	3–0	Bragantino	Belém
16:00 UTC−3	Geandro (yellow card) 50'; Adenílson 62'; Levy 68'; Isac 76'	Report	Pecel (yellow card) 39'	Stadium: Mangueirão; Attendance: 30,860; Referee: Joelson Nazareno Ferreira Cardoso

20 January 2018 2	Independente	2–0	Remo	Tucuruí
17:00 UTC−3	Fabrício 2'; Ezequias 59'; Guly (yellow card) 88'	Report	Adenílson (yellow card) 23'; Esquerdinha (yellow card) 53'	Stadium: Navegantão; Attendance: 2,354; Referee: Andrey da Silva e Silva

23 January 2018 3	Remo	2–0	Águia de Marabá	Belém
20:30 UTC−3	Felipe Marques 1'; Geandro (yellow card) 48'; Yuri (yellow card) 80' (yellow-red card) 81'; Jayme 84'	Report	Mael (yellow card) 51'; Eric (yellow card) 66'	Stadium: Mangueirão; Attendance: 6,055; Referee: Joelson Silva dos Santos

28 January 2018 4	Paysandu	1–2	Remo	Belém
16:00 UTC−3	Diego Ivo 41'; Moisés (yellow card) 58'; Maicon Silva (yellow card) 65'; Cassiano (yellow card) 84'	Report	Bruno Maia (yellow card) 20'; Felipe Marques (yellow card) 56'; Isac 66' (pen.), (yellow card) 67'; Elielton 90+2', (yellow card) 90+3'	Stadium: Mangueirão; Attendance: 31,123; Referee: Marcelo de Lima Henrique

18 February 2018 5	Bragantino	3–2	Remo	Bragança
16:00 UTC−3	Henrique 3', (yellow card) 38'; Romarinho (yellow card) 26'; Pecel 30'; Kléber Queiroz 64'; Alan Calbergue (yellow card) 82'	Report	Yuri (yellow card) 5'; Martony (yellow card) 14'; Adenílson 28'; Leandro Brasília (yellow card) 66'; Elielton 83'	Stadium: Diogão; Attendance: 5,000; Referee: Dewson Fernando Freitas da Silva

24 February 2018 6	Remo	1–1	Cametá	Belém
18:30 UTC−3	Adenílson 27'; Levy (yellow card) 54'; Vinícius (yellow card) 58'; Rodriguinho (yellow card) 71'	Report	Ronaldo Barbosa (yellow card) 56'; Odair 59' (pen.); Maicon Talhetti (yellow card) 75'	Stadium: Mangueirão; Attendance: 3,024; Referee: Gustavo Ramos Melo

28 February 2018 7	Remo	3–1	Independente	Belém
20:30 UTC−3	Elielton 21', 38'; Jefferson Recife 80'; Gustavo (yellow card) 82'	Report	Hallyson 42', (yellow card) 76'; Leandrinho (yellow card) 64'; Chicão (yellow card) 84' (yellow-red card) 90+3'; Charles (yellow card) 89'	Stadium: Mangueirão; Attendance: 1,708; Referee: Andrey da Silva e Silva

4 March 2018 8	Águia de Marabá	0–1	Remo	Marabá
17:00 UTC−3		Report	Isac 7'; Elielton (yellow card) 26'; Levy (yellow card) 88'	Stadium: Estádio Municipal Zinho de Oliveira; Attendance: 1,589; Referee: Gustavo Ramos Melo

11 March 2018 9	Remo	1–0	Paysandu	Belém
16:00 UTC−3	Dudu (yellow card) 19'; Mimica (yellow card) 21'; Felipe Marques 41'; Elielton (yellow card) 50'; Fernandes (yellow card) 57'; Esquerdinha (yellow card) 82'; Gustavo (yellow card) 85'; Isac (red card) 88'	Report	Nando Carandina (yellow card) 18'; Fábio Matos (red card) 81'	Stadium: Mangueirão; Attendance: 20,277; Referee: Rodolpho Toski Marques

18 March 2018 10	Cametá	1–2	Remo	Cametá
16:00 UTC−3	Jessé (yellow card) 59'; Rossales (yellow card) 67'; Caio 82', (yellow card) 90+1'	Report	Mimica 22'; Dudu 30'; Felipe Recife (yellow card) 68'	Stadium: Parque do Bacurau; Attendance: 160; Referee: Joelson Nazareno Ferreira Cardoso

==== Final stage ====
===== Semi-finals =====
22 March 2018 First leg	São Raimundo	1–0	Remo	Santarém
20:00 UTC−3	Jeferson Monte Alegre 24' (pen.); Kleyton (red card) 42'; Moisés (yellow card) 50'; Ciro Luiz (yellow card) 90'; Jader (yellow card) 90+3'	Report	Levy (yellow card) 23'; Bruno Maia (yellow card) 35'; Rodriguinho (yellow card) 82'; Mimica (yellow card) 90+1'	Stadium: Estádio Colosso do Tapajós; Attendance: 3,786; Referee: Djonaltan Costa de Araújo

25 March 2018 Second leg	Remo	2–0 (2–1 agg.)	São Raimundo	Belém
16:00 UTC−3	Esquerdinha (yellow card) 9'; Isac 45'; Felipe Recife (yellow card) 62'; Felipe Marques 65'; Levy (yellow card) 75'; Dudu (yellow card) 90+3'	Report	Jeová (yellow card) 29'; Moisés (yellow card) 37'; Claison (yellow card) 68' (yellow-red card) 76'; Ciro Luiz (yellow card) 73'; Bruno Limão (yellow card) 90' (yellow-red card) 90+3'; Romário (red card) 90+6'	Stadium: Mangueirão; Attendance: 9,006; Referee: Andrey da Silva e Silva

===== Finals =====
1 April 2018 First leg	Paysandu	1–2	Remo	Belém
16:00 UTC−3	Maicon Silva (yellow card) 32'; Cassiano 43' (pen.); Danilo Pires (yellow card) 57'; Edimar (yellow card) 72'	Report	Isac 29' (pen.), (yellow card) 42'; Gustavo (yellow card) 34'; Esquerdinha (yellow card) 68'; Rodriguinho 79'	Stadium: Mangueirão; Attendance: 16,019; Referee: Raphael Claus

8 April 2018 Second leg	Remo	1–0 (3–1 agg.)	Paysandu	Belém
16:00 UTC−3	Isac 27' (pen.); Esquerdinha (yellow card) 32'; Adenílson (yellow card) 34'	Report	Matheus Silva (yellow card) 31'; Mateus Muller (yellow card) 60'; Nando Carandina (yellow card) 90+4'	Stadium: Mangueirão; Attendance: 31,769; Referee: Anderson Daronco

=== Copa Verde ===
==== Round of 16 ====
31 January 2018 First leg	Manaus	2–0	Remo	Manaus
21:00 UTC−3	Hamilton 38', (yellow card) 39'; Rossini 54'; Juninho (yellow card) 71'; Jonathan (yellow card) 88'	Report		Stadium: Arena da Amazônia; Attendance: 1,464; Referee: Valdicleuson Silva da Costa

14 February 2018 Second leg	Remo	1–1 (1–3 agg.)	Manaus	Belém
20:30 UTC−3	Levy (yellow card) 7'; Isac (yellow card) 39'; Adenílson (yellow card) 44'; Mimica 78', (yellow card) 87'; Rodriguinho (yellow card) 80'; Esquerdinha (yellow card) 90+4'	Report	Rossini (yellow card) 9'; Nena (yellow card) 38'; Negueba (yellow card) 45+2' (yellow-red card) 74'; Milton (yellow card) 52'; Wander 71'; Clayton (yellow card) 72'; Hamilton (yellow card) 72'	Stadium: Mangueirão; Attendance: 11,076; Referee: Paulo Henrique de Melo Salmazio

=== Copa do Brasil ===
==== First round ====
7 February 2018	Atlético Itapemirim	0–2	Remo	Itapemirim
15:30 UTC−3	Rhayne (yellow card) 54'	Report	Felipe Recife (yellow card) 10'; Isac 40'; Levy (yellow card) 45+2'; Vinícius (yellow card) 72'; Felipe Marques 81'; Bruno Maia (yellow card) 90+2'	Stadium: Estádio José Olívio Soares; Attendance: 1,146; Referee: José Mendonça da Silva Júnior

==== Second round ====
21 February 2018	Remo	1–2	Internacional	Belém
19:30 UTC−3	Felipe Recife (yellow card) 16'; Felipe Marques 19'; Geandro (yellow card) 36'; Adenílson (yellow card) 88'; Mimica (yellow card) 90+2'	Report	Edenílson (yellow card) 22', (goal) 30'; Leandro Damião 25'; Klaus (yellow card) 33'; Patrick (yellow card) 47'; N. López (yellow card) 85' (yellow-red card) 90+3'; Gabriel Dias (yellow card) 90+4'	Stadium: Mangueirão; Attendance: 13,626; Referee: Marcelo Aparecido Ribeiro de Souza
