= 2018 Campeonato Paraense finals =

- Event: 2018 Campeonato Paraense
Paysandu	Remo
1	3
- on aggregate

First leg
Paysandu	Remo
1	2
- Date: 1 April 2018
- Venue: Mangueirão, Belém
- Referee: Raphael Claus
- Attendance: 16,019

Second leg
Remo	Paysandu
1	0
- Date: 8 April 2018
- Venue: Mangueirão, Belém
- Referee: Anderson Daronco
- Attendance: 31,769

The 2018 Campeonato Paraense finals was the final that decided the 2018 Campeonato Paraense, the 106th season of the Campeonato Paraense. The final were contested between Paysandu and Remo.

Remo defeated Paysandu 3–1 on aggregate to win their 45th Campeonato Paraense title.

== Road to the final ==
Note: In all scores below, the score of the home team is given first.

Paysandu			Round	Remo		
Opponent	Venue	Score		Opponent	Venue	Score
Group A1			Group stage	Group A2		
Pos / Team / Pld / Pts; 1 / Paysandu (A) / 10 / 20; 2 / Bragantino (A) / 10 / 19; 3 / Independente / 10 / 13; 4 / Águia de Marabá / 10 / 11; 5 / Cametá (R) / 10 / 4; Source: (A) Advance to a further round; (R) Relegated			Group stage	Pos / Team / Pld / Pts; 1 / Remo (A) / 10 / 22; 2 / São Raimundo (A) / 10 / 16; 3 / Castanhal / 10 / 13; 4 / Paragominas / 10 / 11; 5 / Parauapebas (R) / 10 / 8; Source: (A) Advance to a further round; (R) Relegated		
Bragantino (tied 2–2 on aggregate, won 4–2 on penalties)	Away	2–0	Semi-finals	São Raimundo (won 2–1 on aggregate)	Away	1–0
Bragantino (tied 2–2 on aggregate, won 4–2 on penalties)	Home	2–0	Semi-finals	São Raimundo (won 2–1 on aggregate)	Home	2–0

== Format ==
The finals were played on a home-and-away two-legged basis. If tied on aggregate, the penalty shoot-out was used to determine the winner.

== Matches ==
=== First leg ===
1 April 2018
16:00 UTC−3

Paysandu	1–2	Remo
Cassiano 43' (pen.)	Report	Isac 29' (pen.); Rodriguinho 79'

Mangueirão, Belém
Attendance: 16,019
Referee: Raphael Claus

Paysandu	Remo

GK	12	(Brazil) Marcão (c)
DF	2	(Brazil) Maicon Silva	(yellow card) 32'	(substituted off) 48'
DF	26	(Brazil) Perema
DF	30	(Brazil) Edimar		(yellow card) 72'
DF	34	(Brazil) Mateus Müller
MF	28	(Paraguay) Luis Cáceres		(substituted off) 53'
MF	25	(Brazil) Danilo Pires		(yellow card) 57'
MF	19	(Brazil) Walter
FW	9	(Brazil) Moisés
FW	18	(Brazil) Mike
FW	39	(Brazil) Cassiano		(substituted off) 46'
Substitutes:
DF	13	(Brazil) Matheus Silva		(substituted in) 48'
MF	6	(Brazil) Wylliam		(substituted in) 46'
MF	10	(Brazil) Fábio Matos		(substituted in) 53'
Coach:
(Brazil) Dado Cavalcanti

GK	1	(Brazil) Vinícius
DF	2	(Brazil) Gustavo		(yellow card) 34'
DF	3	(Brazil) Mimica
DF	4	(Brazil) Bruno Maia
DF	6	(Brazil) Esquerdinha		(yellow card) 68'
MF	5	(Brazil) Dudu
MF	8	(Brazil) Felipe Recife		(substituted off) 65'
MF	10	(Brazil) Adenílson		(substituted off) 73'
FW	7	(Brazil) Elielton
FW	17	(Brazil) Jayme
FW	9	(Brazil) Isac (c)	(yellow card) 42'	(substituted off) 82'
Substitutes:
MF	14	(Brazil) Fernandes		(substituted in) 65'
MF	16	(Brazil) Jefferson Recife		(substituted in) 82'
MF	15	(Brazil) Rodriguinho		(substituted in) 73'
Coach:
(Brazil) Givanildo Oliveira

Assistant referees:
Fabrício Vilarinho da Silva (Goiás)
Rogério Pablos Zanardo (São Paulo)
Fourth official:
Wasley do Couto Leão (Pará)
Fifth official:
Nadilson Sousa dos Santos (Pará)

=== Second leg ===
8 April 2018
16:00 UTC−3

Remo	1–0	Paysandu
Isac 27' (pen.)	Report

Mangueirão, Belém
Attendance: 31,769
Referee: Anderson Daronco

Remo	Paysandu

GK	1	(Brazil) Vinícius
DF	2	(Brazil) Levy
DF	3	(Brazil) Mimica
DF	4	(Brazil) Bruno Maia
DF	6	(Brazil) Esquerdinha	(yellow card) 32'
MF	5	(Brazil) Dudu
MF	8	(Brazil) Felipe Recife	(substituted off) 26'
MF	10	(Brazil) Adenílson	(yellow card) 34'
FW	7	(Brazil) Elielton	(substituted off) 61'
FW	11	(Brazil) Felipe Marques	(substituted off) 87'
FW	9	(Brazil) Isac (c)
Substitutes:
MF	19	(Brazil) Fernandes	(substituted in) 26'
MF	15	(Brazil) Rodriguinho	(substituted in) 87'
FW	17	(Brazil) Jayme	(substituted in) 61'
Coach:
(Brazil) Givanildo Oliveira

GK	12	(Brazil) Marcão
DF	13	(Brazil) Matheus Silva	(yellow card) 31'	(substituted off) 46'
DF	4	(Brazil) Diego Ivo (c)
DF	30	(Brazil) Edimar
DF	34	(Brazil) Mateus Müller		(yellow card) 60'
MF	14	(Brazil) Nando Carandina		(yellow card) 90+4'
MF	6	(Brazil) Wylliam		(substituted off) 46'
MF	20	(Brazil) Pedro Carmona
FW	18	(Brazil) Mike		(substituted off) 79'
FW	19	(Brazil) Walter
FW	39	(Brazil) Cassiano
Substitutes:
MF	25	(Brazil) Danilo Pires		(substituted in) 46'
FW	11	(Brazil) Peu		(substituted in) 79'
FW	9	(Brazil) Moisés		(substituted in) 46'
Coach:
(Brazil) Dado Cavalcanti

Assistant referees:
Alessandro Álvaro de Matos (Bahia)
Guilherme Dias Camilo (Minas Gerais)
Fourth official:
Dewson Fernando Freitas da Silva (Pará)
Fifth official:
Joquetan Moreira Guimarães (Pará)

== See also ==
- 2019 Copa Verde
- 2019 Copa do Brasil
