= 2018 Copa Verde finals =

- Event: 2018 Copa Verde
Atlético Itapemirim	Paysandu
(Espírito Santo)	(Pará)
1	3
- on aggregate

First leg
Atlético Itapemirim	Paysandu
0	2
- Date: 25 April 2018
- Venue: Estádio Kléber Andrade, Cariacica
- Referee: Rodolpho Toski Marques
- Attendance: 6,965

Second leg
Paysandu	Atlético Itapemirim
1	1
- Date: 16 May 2018
- Venue: Mangueirão, Belém
- Referee: Anderson Daronco
- Attendance: 32,900

The 2018 Copa Verde finals was the final two-legged tie that decided the 2018 Copa Verde, the 5th season of the Copa Verde, Brazil's regional cup football tournament organised by the Brazilian Football Confederation.

The finals were contested in a two-legged home-and-away format between Atlético Itapemirim, from Espírito Santo, and Paysandu, from Pará.

Paysandu defeated Atlético Itapemirim 3–1 on aggregate to win their second Copa Verde title.

== Teams ==
Team	Previous finals appearances (bold indicates winners)
(Espírito Santo) Atlético Itapemirim	None
(Pará) Paysandu	3 (2014, **2016**, 2017)

=== Road to the final ===
Note: In all scores below, the score of the finalist is given first.

(Espírito Santo) Atlético Itapemirim			Round	(Pará) Paysandu		
Opponent	Venue	Score		Opponent	Venue	Score
Bye			Preliminary round	Bye		
(Federal District (Brazil)) Brasiliense (won 5–3 on aggregate)	Home	2–1	Round of 16	(Tocantins) Interporto (won 4–0 on aggregate)	Away	0–0
(Federal District (Brazil)) Brasiliense (won 5–3 on aggregate)	Away	3–2	Round of 16	(Tocantins) Interporto (won 4–0 on aggregate)	Home	4–0
(Mato Grosso) Cuiabá (won 6–3 on aggregate)	Away	3–2	Quarter-finals	(Amapá) Santos (won 7–4 on aggregate)	Away	3–2
(Mato Grosso) Cuiabá (won 6–3 on aggregate)	Home	3–1	Quarter-finals	(Amapá) Santos (won 7–4 on aggregate)	Home	4–2
(Mato Grosso) Luverdense (won 2–1 on aggregate)	Away	1–0	Semi-finals	(Amazonas (Brazilian state)) Manaus (won 4–2 on aggregate)	Home	2–1
(Mato Grosso) Luverdense (won 2–1 on aggregate)	Home	1–1	Semi-finals	(Amazonas (Brazilian state)) Manaus (won 4–2 on aggregate)	Away	2–1

== Format ==
The finals were played on a home-and-away two-legged basis. If tied on aggregate, the penalty shoot-out was used to determine the winner.

== Matches ==
=== First leg ===
25 April 2018
21:30 BRT (UTC−3)

Atlético Itapemirim (Espírito Santo)	0–2	(Pará) Paysandu
	Report	Cassiano 54', 72'

Estádio Kléber Andrade, Cariacica
Attendance: 6,965
Referee: Rodolpho Toski Marques (Paraná)

**Atlético Itapemirim**	**Paysandu**

GK	1	(Brazil) Bambu
DF	2	(Brazil) Paulinho
DF	3	(Brazil) Rhayne
DF	4	(Brazil) Kléber Viana (c)
DF	6	(Brazil) Marcos Felipe
MF	5	(Brazil) Vitor
MF	8	(Brazil) Araruama	(substituted off) 79'
MF	10	(Brazil) Fabiano	(substituted off) 79'
FW	7	(Brazil) Franklin
FW	11	(Brazil) Uálisson Pikachu	(substituted off) 89'
FW	9	(Brazil) Eraldo
Substitutes:
GK	12	(Brazil) Filipe
DF	13	(Brazil) Felipe Foca
DF	14	(Brazil) Bruno
DF	15	(Brazil) Pedrão
DF	18	(Brazil) Leandro Tanaka
MF	16	(Brazil) Gaúcho
MF	17	(Brazil) Júnior Santos	(substituted in) 79'
FW	19	(Brazil) Henrique Goebel
FW	20	(Brazil) Charles	(substituted in) 79'
FW	21	(Brazil) Chiquinho	(substituted in) 89'
FW	22	(Brazil) Kaio César
Coach:
(Brazil) Zé Humberto

GK	1	(Brazil) Renan Rocha
DF	4	(Brazil) Diego Ivo (c)	(substituted off) 81'
DF	30	(Brazil) Edimar
DF	26	(Brazil) Perema
MF	13	(Brazil) Matheus Silva	(substituted off) 74'
MF	14	(Brazil) Nando Carandina
MF	5	(Brazil) Renato Augusto
MF	34	(Brazil) Mateus Müller
FW	18	(Brazil) Mike	(substituted off) 73'
FW	39	(Brazil) Cassiano
FW	9	(Brazil) Moisés
Substitutes:
GK	12	(Brazil) Marcão
DF	15	(Brazil) Douglas Mendes	(substituted in) 81'
DF	32	(Brazil) Victor Lindemberg
MF	6	(Brazil) Willyam	(substituted in) 74'
MF	16	(Brazil) Lucas Geovani
FW	11	(Brazil) Peu
FW	31	(Brazil) Magno	(substituted in) 73'
FW	38	(Brazil) Renan Gorne
Coach:
(Brazil) Dado Cavalcanti

Assistant referees:
Fabrício Vilarinho da Silva (Goiás)
Bruno Raphael Pires (Goiás)
Fourth official:
Dyorgenes José Padovani de Andrade (Espírito Santo)
Fifth official:
Fabiano da Silva Ramires (Espírito Santo)

=== Second leg ===
16 May 2018
21:30 BRT (UTC−3)

Paysandu (Pará)	1–1	(Espírito Santo) Atlético Itapemirim
Pedro Carmona 72'	Report	Eraldo 39'

Mangueirão, Belém
Attendance: 32,900
Referee: Anderson Daronco (Rio Grande do Sul)

**Paysandu**	**Atlético Itapemirim**

GK	1	(Brazil) Renan Rocha
DF	4	(Brazil) Diego Ivo (c)	(yellow card) 75'
DF	30	(Brazil) Edimar
DF	26	(Brazil) Perema
MF	13	(Brazil) Matheus Silva	(substituted off) 74'
MF	14	(Brazil) Nando Carandina
MF	5	(Brazil) Renato Augusto
MF	32	(Brazil) Victor Lindemberg	(substituted off) 65'
FW	18	(Brazil) Mike
FW	39	(Brazil) Cassiano
FW	9	(Brazil) Moisés	(substituted off) 65'
Substitutes:
GK	12	(Brazil) Marcão
GK	35	(Brazil) Gabriel Bubniack
DF	2	(Brazil) Maicon Silva	(substituted in) 74'
DF	15	(Brazil) Douglas Mendes
DF	34	(Brazil) Mateus Müller	(substituted in) 65'
MF	6	(Brazil) Willyam
MF	16	(Brazil) Lucas Geovani
MF	20	(Brazil) Pedro Carmona	(substituted in) 65'
MF	25	(Brazil) Danilo Pires
MF	28	(Paraguay) Luis Cáceres
FW	11	(Brazil) Peu
FW	38	(Brazil) Renan Gorne
Coach:
(Brazil) Dado Cavalcanti

GK	1	(Brazil) Bambu
DF	2	(Brazil) Paulinho
DF	3	(Brazil) Rhayne		(yellow card) 90+2'
DF	4	(Brazil) Kléber Viana (c)		(substituted off) 61'
DF	6	(Brazil) Marcos Felipe
MF	5	(Brazil) Araruama
MF	8	(Brazil) Júnior Santos	(yellow card) 65'	(substituted off) 86'
MF	10	(Brazil) Fabiano
FW	7	(Brazil) Franklin
FW	11	(Brazil) Uálisson Pikachu		(substituted off) 77'
FW	9	(Brazil) Eraldo
Substitutes:
GK	12	(Brazil) Filipe
DF	13	(Brazil) Felipe Foca
DF	14	(Brazil) Pedrão	(yellow card) 67'	(substituted in) 61'
DF	17	(Brazil) Bruno		(substituted in) 77'
MF	15	(Brazil) Vitor
MF	16	(Brazil) Gaúcho
FW	18	(Brazil) Henrique Goebel		(substituted in) 86'
FW	19	(Brazil) Kaio César
FW	20	(Brazil) Chiquinho
Coach:
(Brazil) Zé Humberto

Assistant referees:
Alessandro Álvaro Rocha de Matos (Bahia)
Tatiane Sacilotti dos Santos Camargo (São Paulo)
Fourth official:
Andrey da Silva e Silva (Pará)
Fifth official:
Bárbara Roberta da Costa Loiola (Pará)

== See also ==
- 2019 Copa do Brasil
