= 2019 Copa Verde =

6th edition of a Brazilian association football competition

Tournament details
- Country: Brazil
- Dates: 24 July – 20 November
- Teams: 24

Final positions
- Champions: (Mato Grosso) Cuiabá (2nd title)
- Runners-up: (Pará) Paysandu

Tournament statistics
- Matches played: 46
- Goals scored: 117 (2.54 per match)
- Top goal scorer(s): (Brazil) Douglas Oliveira (5 goals)

The 2019 Copa Verde was the sixth edition of a football competition held in Brazil. Featuring 24 clubs, Acre, Amazonas, Distrito Federal, Espírito Santo, Goiás, Mato Grosso, Mato Grosso do Sul and Pará have two vacancies; Amapá, Rondônia and Roraima with one each. The others five berths was set according to CBF ranking.

In the finals, Cuiabá defeated Paysandu 5–4 on penalties after tied 1–1 on aggregate to win their second title and a place in the Round of 16 of the 2020 Copa do Brasil.

== Qualified teams ==
Association	Team	Qualification method
(Acre (state)) Acre; 2+1 berths	Galvez	2018 Campeonato Acriano runners-up
(Acre (state)) Acre; 2+1 berths	Humaitá	2018 Campeonato Acriano 5th place
(Acre (state)) Acre; 2+1 berths	Atlético Acreano	3rd best placed team in the 2019 CBF ranking not already qualified
(Amapá) Amapá; 1+1 berths	Ypiranga	2018 Campeonato Amapaense champions
(Amapá) Amapá; 1+1 berths	Santos	4th best placed team in the 2019 CBF ranking not already qualified
(Amazonas (Brazilian state)) Amazonas; 2+1 berths	Manaus	2018 Campeonato Amazonense champions
(Amazonas (Brazilian state)) Amazonas; 2+1 berths	Fast Clube	2018 Campeonato Amazonense runners-up
(Amazonas (Brazilian state)) Amazonas; 2+1 berths	Nacional	5th best placed team in the 2019 CBF ranking not already qualified
(Federal District (Brazil)) Distrito Federal; 2 berths	Sobradinho	2018 Campeonato Brasiliense champions
(Federal District (Brazil)) Distrito Federal; 2 berths	Brasiliense	2018 Campeonato Brasiliense runners-up
(Espírito Santo) Espírito Santo; 2 berths	Vitória	2018 Copa Espírito Santo champions
(Espírito Santo) Espírito Santo; 2 berths	Real Noroeste	2018 Copa Espírito Santo 4th place
(Goiás) Goiás; 2 berths	Goiás	2018 Campeonato Goiano champions
(Goiás) Goiás; 2 berths	Iporá	2018 Campeonato Goiano 5th place
(Mato Grosso) Mato Grosso; 2+1 berths	Cuiabá	2018 Campeonato Mato-Grossense champions
(Mato Grosso) Mato Grosso; 2+1 berths	Sinop	2018 Campeonato Mato-Grossense runners-up
(Mato Grosso) Mato Grosso; 2+1 berths	Luverdense	2nd best placed team in the 2019 CBF ranking not already qualified
(Mato Grosso do Sul) Mato Grosso do Sul; 2 berths	União ABC	2018 Campeonato Sul-Mato-Grossense 7th place
(Mato Grosso do Sul) Mato Grosso do Sul; 2 berths	Costa Rica	2018 Campeonato Sul-Mato-Grossense 10th place
(Pará) Pará; 2+1 berths	Remo	2018 Campeonato Paraense champions
(Pará) Pará; 2+1 berths	Bragantino	2018 Campeonato Paraense 3rd place
(Pará) Pará; 2+1 berths	Paysandu	1st best placed team in the 2019 CBF ranking not already qualified
(Rondônia) Rondônia; 1 berth	Genus	2018 Campeonato Rondoniense 6th place
(Roraima) Roraima; 1 berth	São Raimundo	2018 Campeonato Roraimense champions

Note: The state of Tocantins, which at the beginning would be represented by Palmas, was without representatives after the same give up, not being replaced by another club.

== Schedule ==
The schedule of the competition is as follows.

Stage	First leg	Second leg
First stage	24, 25 and 27 July 2019	31 July and 1 and 2 August 2019
Round of 16	7, 8, 13 and 14 August 2019	14, 20 and 21 August 2019
Quarter-finals	3, 4 and 11 September 2019	11, 15 and 18 September 2019
Semi-finals	18 and 29 September 2019	6 and 23 October 2019
Finals	14 November 2019	20 November 2019

== Bracket ==
First round
(Mato Grosso do Sul) União ABC	1	3	4
(Acre (state)) Galvez	0	1	1
(Espírito Santo) Vitória	0	0	0 (3)
(Federal District (Brazil)) Brasiliense (p)	0	0	0 (5)
(Mato Grosso do Sul) Costa Rica	2	2	4
(Rondônia) Genus	0	2	2
(Espírito Santo) Real Noroeste	1	0	1
(Goiás) Iporá	0	2	2
(Amapá) Ypiranga	3	1	4
(Amazonas (Brazilian state)) Fast Clube	0	2	2
(Federal District (Brazil)) Sobradinho	4	1	5
(Amazonas (Brazilian state)) Manaus	1	2	3
(Acre (state)) Humaitá	1	0	1
(Amazonas (Brazilian state)) Nacional	1	2	3
(Pará) Bragantino	2	2	4
(Roraima) São Raimundo	1	1	2

Round of 16
(Mato Grosso do Sul) União ABC	2	2	4
(Mato Grosso) Luverdense	3	6	9
(Federal District (Brazil)) Brasiliense	0	1	1
Goiás	0	4	4
(Mato Grosso do Sul) Costa Rica	2	3	5
(Mato Grosso) Sinop	1	0	1
(Goiás) Iporá	1	1	2 (5)
(Mato Grosso) Cuiabá (p)	2	0	2 (6)
(Amapá) Ypiranga	0	1	1
(Acre (state)) Atlético Acreano	2	2	4
(Federal District (Brazil)) Sobradinho	1	0	1
(Pará) Remo	0	3	3
(Amazonas (Brazilian state)) Nacional	0	0	0
(Pará) Paysandu	1	0	1
(Pará) Bragantino	1	1	2
(Amapá) Santos	0	1	1

Quarter-finals
(Mato Grosso) Luverdense	2	2	4
Goiás	1	4	5
(Mato Grosso do Sul) Costa Rica	1	1	2
(Mato Grosso) Cuiabá	1	2	3
(Acre (state)) Atlético Acreano	2	1	3
(Pará) Remo	1	6	7
(Pará) Paysandu (p)	1	1	2 (6)
(Pará) Bragantino	1	1	2 (5)

Semi-finals
Goiás	1	1	2 (3)
(Mato Grosso) Cuiabá (p)	0	2	2 (4)
(Pará) Remo	0	1	1
(Pará) Paysandu	0	3	3

Finals
(Mato Grosso) Cuiabá (p)	0	1	1 (5)
(Pará) Paysandu	1	0	1 (4)

== Finals ==
14 November 2019
20:00 AMT (UTC−4)

Cuiabá (Mato Grosso)	0–1	(Pará) Paysandu
	Report	Nicolas 68'

Arena Pantanal, Cuiabá
Attendance: 11,973
Referee: André Luiz de Freitas Castro

20 November 2019
21:00 BRT (UTC−3)

Paysandu (Pará)	0–1	(Mato Grosso) Cuiabá
	Report	Paulinho 90+4'
Penalties
Leandro Lima (penalty scored); Thiago Primão (penalty scored); Tony (penalty scored); Micael (penalty scored); Caíque Oliveira (penalty missed); Nicolas (penalty missed)	4–5	(penalty missed) Ednei; (penalty scored) Gutiérrez; (penalty scored) Escudero; (penalty scored) Alex Ruan; (penalty scored) Paulinho; (penalty scored) Felipe Marques

Mangueirão, Belém
Attendance: 28,145
Referee: Sávio Sampaio

Tied 1–1 on aggregate, Cuiabá won on penalties.
