= Douglas Mendes =

Douglas Mendes may refer to:

- Douglas Mendes (footballer, born 1988), full name Douglas Augusto Mendes dos Santos, Brazilian football centre back
- Douglas Mendes (footballer, born 2004), full name Douglas Mendes Moreira, Brazilian football centre back
