= Yan Souto =

Brazilian footballer

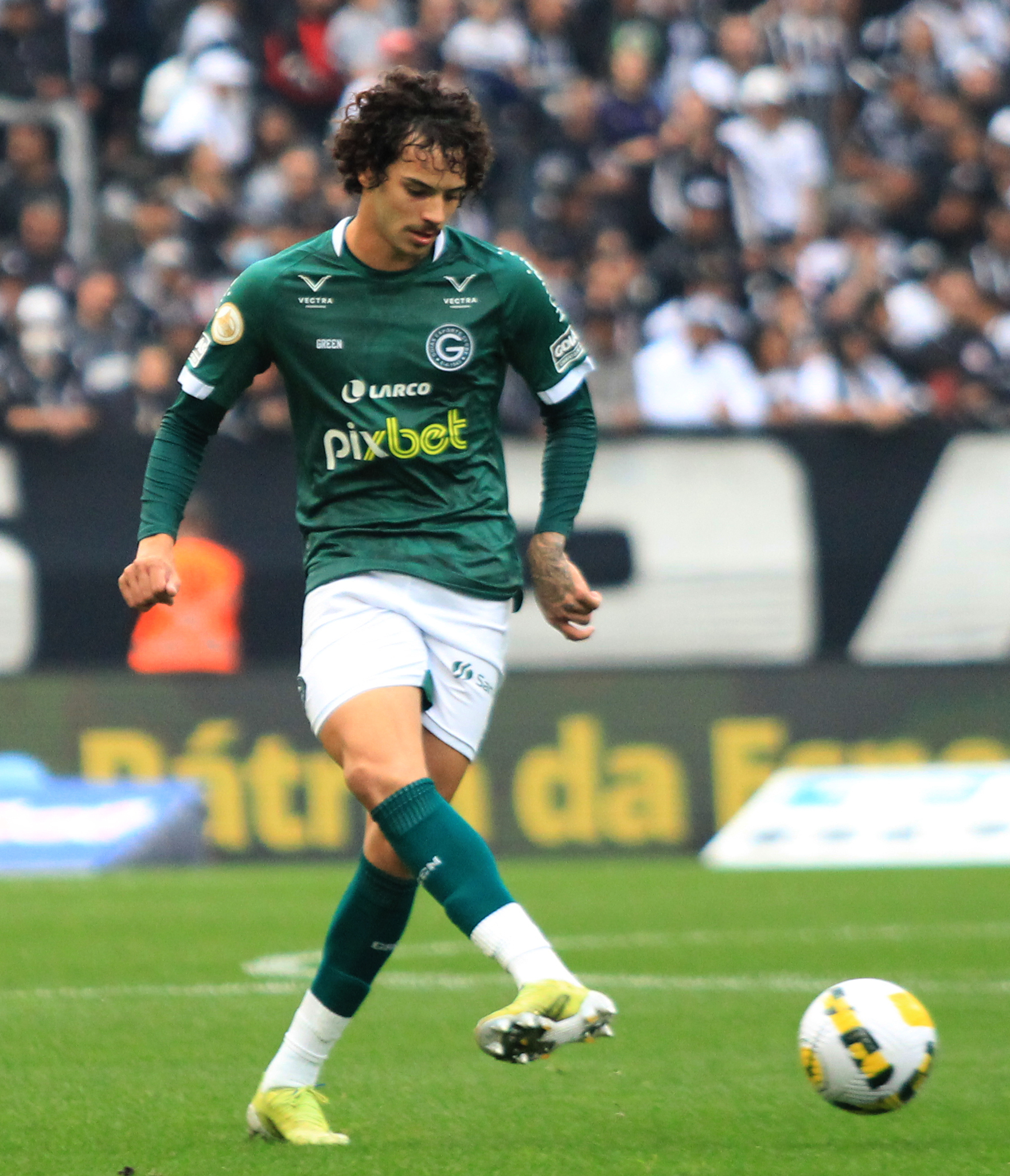

Personal information
- Full name: Yan da Cruz Souto
- Date of birth: 5 October 2001 (age 25)
- Place of birth: Campo Grande, Brazil
- Height: 1.88 m (6 ft 2 in)
- Position: Centre back

Team information
- Current team: Botafogo-PB
- Number: 3

Youth career
- 2017: União ABC
- 2018–2021: Londrina

Senior career*
Years	Team	Apps	(Gls)
2021	União ABC	12	(0)
2021	Boston City Brasil	6	(0)
2022	Floresta	0	(0)
2022–2024	Goiás	34	(1)
2023	→ Vitória (loan)	14	(0)
2024–2025	Juventude	4	(1)
2025	→ CRB (loan)	5	(0)
2025	→ Criciúma (loan)	18	(0)
2024–	Botafogo-PB	30	(2)
- * Club domestic league appearances and goals as of 8 November 2026

Yan da Cruz Souto (born 5 October 2001), known as Yan Souto, is a Brazilian professional footballer who plays as a centre-back for Botafogo-PB.

== Club career ==
Born in Campo Grande, Mato Grosso do Sul, Yan Souto began his career with hometown club União ABC before joining Londrina in 2018. He left the club in 2021 and returned to União ABC, making his senior debut during that year’s Campeonato Sul-Mato-Grossense.

On 7 January 2022, after a short spell with Boston City Brasil, Souto signed for Floresta, reuniting with manager Ricardo Drubscky. After making five appearances, he was announced as a new signing for Goiás, a Série A club, on 11 March 2022.

Souto made his Série A debut on 19 June 2022, starting in a 1–0 away defeat to Corinthians. He was loaned to Vitória in Série B on 27 March 2023, where he helped the club win the league and secure promotion as champions.

Returning to Goiás for the 2024 campaign, now back in the second division, Souto featured regularly before transferring to top-flight side Juventude on 19 July 2024, signing a contract until 2026.

== Career statistics ==
As of 24 July 2024

Club	Season	League			State League		Cup		Continental		Other		Total	
Club	Season	Division	Apps	Goals	Apps	Goals	Apps	Goals	Apps	Goals	Apps	Goals	Apps	Goals
União ABC	2021	Sul-Mato-Grossense	—		12	0	—		—		—		12	0
Boston City Brasil	2021	Mineiro 2ª Divisão	—		6	0	—		—		—		6	0
Floresta	2022	Série C	0	0	0	0	—		—		5 (Note: Appearance(s) in Copa do Nordeste)	0	5	0
Goiás	2022	Série A	8	1	5	0	1	0	—		—		14	1
Goiás	2023	Série A	0	0	4	0	0	0	0	0	1 (Note: Appearance(s) in Copa Verde)	0	5	0
Goiás	2024	Série B	4	0	13	0	0	0	—		0	0	17	0
Goiás	Total		12	1	22	0	1	0	0	0	1	0	36	1
Vitória (loan)	2023	Série B	14	0	—		—		—		—		14	0
Juventude	2024	Série A	0	0	—		0	0	—		—		0	0
Career total			26	1	40	0	1	0	0	0	6	0	73	1

== Honours ==
Vitória

- Campeonato Brasileiro Série B: 2023
