= 2018 Campeonato Paraense =

Campeonato Paraense de Futebol
- Season: 2018
- Champions: Remo
- Relegated: Parauapebas; Cametá
- Série D: Bragantino; São Raimundo
- Copa Verde: Remo; Bragantino
- Copa do Brasil: Remo; Paysandu (via Copa Verde); Bragantino; São Raimundo
- Matches played: 58
- Goals scored: 146 (2.52 per match)
- Top goalscorer: Dedeco (7 goals)
- Biggest home win: Paysandu 4–0 Castanhal (25 February 2018)
- Biggest away win: Castanhal 2–4 Paysandu (21 January 2018)
- Highest scoring: Cametá 3–4 Castanhal (4 March 2018)
- Highest attendance: 31,769; Remo 1–0 Paysandu (8 April 2018)
- Lowest attendance: 91; Castanhal 4–1 Independente (18 March 2018)

The 2018 Campeonato Paraense de Futebol was the 106th edition of Pará's top professional football league. The competition started on 13 January and ended on 8 April. Remo won the championship for the 45th time.

== Format ==
The competition will consist of two groups of five teams each, who will face off in round games and back against the other key times in a single turn. The top two will contest the semi-finals in their respective groups, thereby defining the two championship finalists. The losers of the semifinals will make two matches to decide the third place. Semifinal and final matches will round trip.

The worst placed of each group will be relegated to the Second Division.

The champion and the best placed team not qualified via CBF ranking qualify to the 2019 Copa Verde. The champion, the runner-up and the 3rd-placed team qualify to the 2019 Copa do Brasil. The best two teams who isn't on Campeonato Brasileiro Série A, Série B or Série C qualifies to 2019 Campeonato Brasileiro Série D.

== Participating teams ==
Club	Home city	2017 result
Águia de Marabá	Marabá	5th
Bragantino	Bragança	1st (on 2nd Division)
Cametá	Cametá	7th
Castanhal	Castanhal	6th
Independente	Tucuruí	3rd
Paragominas	Paragominas	8th
Parauapebas	Parauapebas	2nd (on 2nd Division)
Paysandu	Belém	1st
Remo	Belém	2nd
São Raimundo	Santarém	4th

== Group stage ==
=== Group A1 ===
Pos	Team	Pld	W	D	L	GF	GA	GD	Pts	Qualification or relegation
1	Paysandu (A)	10	6	2	2	17	8	+9	20	Qualifies to the Semifinals
2	Bragantino (A)	10	6	1	3	17	15	+2	19	Qualifies to the Semifinals
3	Independente	10	3	4	3	12	14	−2	13	
4	Águia de Marabá	10	3	2	5	7	14	−7	11	
5	Cametá (R)	10	0	4	6	10	18	−8	4	2019 Paraense 2nd Division

(A) Advance to a further round; (R) Relegated

=== Group A2 ===
Pos	Team	Pld	W	D	L	GF	GA	GD	Pts	Qualification or relegation
1	Remo (A)	10	7	1	2	17	9	+8	22	Qualifies to the semi-finals
2	São Raimundo (A)	10	5	1	4	15	12	+3	16	Qualifies to the semi-finals
3	Castanhal	10	4	1	5	16	17	−1	13	
4	Paragominas	10	2	5	3	12	12	0	11	
5	Parauapebas (R)	10	1	5	4	9	13	−4	8	2019 Paraense 2nd Division

(A) Advance to a further round; (R) Relegated

== Semi-finals ==
=== Match 51 ===
21 March 2018
16:00 UTC –3

Bragantino	2–0	Paysandu
Mauro Ajuruteua 62'; Gabriel 66'	Report

Diogão, Bragança
Attendance: 4,750
Referee: Joelson Nazareno Ferreira Cardoso

24 March 2018
18:00 UTC –3

Paysandu	2–0	Bragantino
Cassiano 44' (pen.); Diego Ivo 45+3'	Report
Penalties
Cassiano (penalty scored); Mike (penalty scored); Mateus Muller (penalty scored); Fábio Matos (penalty missed); Walter (penalty scored)	4–2	(penalty scored) Keoma; (penalty missed) Gabriel; (penalty scored) Serafim; (penalty missed) Paulo de Tárcio

Estádio da Curuzú, Belém
Attendance: 7,463
Referee: Gustavo Ramos Melo

Tied 2–2 on aggregate, Paysandu won on penalties and advanced to the final.

=== Match 52 ===
22 March 2018
20:00 UTC –3

São Raimundo	1–0	Remo
Jeferson Monte Alegre 24' (pen.)	Report

Estádio Jader Barbalho, Santarém
Attendance: 3,786
Referee: Djonaltan Costa de Araújo

25 March 2018
16:00 UTC –3

Remo	2–0	São Raimundo
Isac 45'; Felipe Marques 65'	Report

Mangueirão, Belém
Attendance: 9,006
Referee: Andrey da Silva e Silva

Remo won 2–1 on aggregate and advanced to the final.

== Third place play-off ==
31 March 2018
20:00 UTC –3

São Raimundo	1–1	Bragantino
Wendell 73' (pen.)	Report	Keoma 57' (pen.)

Estádio Jader Barbalho, Santarém
Attendance: 561
Referee: Gustavo Ramos Melo

7 April 2018
15:30 UTC –3

Bragantino	1–0	São Raimundo
Marcelo Maciel 42'	Report

Diogão, Bragança
Attendance: 1,688
Referee: Wasley do Couto

== Finals ==
1 April 2018
16:00 UTC –3

Paysandu	1–2	Remo
Cassiano 43' (pen.)	Report	Isac 29' (pen.); Rodriguinho 79'

Mangueirão, Belém
Attendance: 16,019
Referee: Raphael Claus

8 April 2018
16:00 UTC –3

Remo	1–0	Paysandu
Isac 27' (pen.)	Report

Mangueirão, Belém
Attendance: 31,769
Referee: Anderson Daronco
