= Gilson (footballer, born 1986) =

Brazilian footballer

Personal information
- Full name: Gilson Gomes do Nascimento
- Date of birth: 14 May 1986 (age 40)
- Place of birth: Campo Grande, Brazil
- Height: 1.78 m (5 ft 10 in)
- Position: Left back

Team information
- Current team: União ABC

Youth career
- 2003–2005: CENE

Senior career*
Years	Team	Apps	(Gls)
2005–2007	CENE		
2007	Botafogo-SP		
2008	São José-SP		
2009	Mirassol		
2009	Cuiabá		
2010	Cascavel		
2010	Paraná	13	(0)
2010–2011	Grêmio	12	(0)
2011	→ América Mineiro (loan)	26	(3)
2012–2015	Cruzeiro	0	(0)
2012	→ Vitória (loan)	20	(1)
2013	→ Criciúma (loan)	17	(0)
2014	→ América Mineiro (loan)	33	(6)
2015	→ Ponte Preta (loan)	32	(0)
2016	Ponte Preta	1	(0)
2016	América Mineiro	18	(1)
2017–2019	Botafogo	61	(1)
2020	Botafogo-SP	15	(0)
2023	Volta Redonda	2	(0)
2023–	União ABC		
- * Club domestic league appearances and goals as of 19 January 2023

Gilson Gomes do Nascimento (born 14 May 1986), simply known as Gilson, is a Brazilian footballer who plays as a left back for União ABC.

== Career ==
On 20 April 2015, Gilson joined Ponte Preta on loan from Cruzeiro until the end of the 2015 season. On 24 October, he signed a pre-contract with Macaca.

== Honours ==
=== Club ===
CENE

- Campeonato Sul-Matogrossense: 2005

Criciúma

- Campeonato Catarinense: 2013

Botafogo

- Campeonato Carioca: 2018
