= Everton (footballer, born August 1984) =

Brazilian footballer

Personal information
- Full name: Francisco Everton de Almeida Andrade
- Date of birth: 8 August 1984 (age 42)
- Place of birth: Maranguape, Brazil
- Height: 1.71 m (5 ft 7 in)
- Positions: Centre midfielder; left wing back

Team information
- Current team: Fortaleza

Senior career*
Years	Team	Apps	(Gls)
2005	Maranguape		
2005	Maracanã		
2006	Maranguape		
2006	Ferroviário		
2006	Trairiense		
2007–2009	Grêmio Barueri		
2010	Fluminense		
2010–2013	Cruzeiro		
2014	Criciúma		
2014	Joinville		
2015–	Fortaleza		
2017	→ Figueirense (loan)		
- * Club domestic league appearances and goals as of 16 October 2010 ‡ National team caps and goals as of 16 October 2010

Francisco Éverton de Almeida Andrade (born 8 August 1984 in Maranguape), better known as Everton, is a Brazilian footballer who acts as a steering centre midfielder and left wingback. He currently plays for Fortaleza.

== Career statistics ==
(Correct as of October 16, 2010)

Club	Season	State League		Brazilian Série A		Copa do Brasil		Copa Libertadores		Copa Sudamericana		Total	
Club	Season	Apps	Goals	Apps	Goals	Apps	Goals	Apps	Goals	Apps	Goals	Apps	Goals
Fluminense	2010	0	0	0	0	0	0	-	-	-	-	0	0
Cruzeiro	2010	-	-	15	1	-	-	-	-	-	-	15	1
Total		0	0	15	1	0	0	-	-	-	-	15	1

== Honours ==
Cruzeiro

- Campeonato Mineiro: 2011
- Campeonato Brasileiro Série A: 2013

Joinville

- Campeonato Brasileiro Série B: 2014

Fortaleza

- Campeonato Cearense: 2015, 2016
