= Andrey (footballer, born 1996) =

Brazilian footballer

Personal information
- Full name: Andrey Falinski Rodrigues
- Date of birth: 18 March 1996 (age 30)
- Place of birth: Dourados, Brazil
- Height: 1.74 m (5 ft 9 in)
- Position: Midfielder

Team information
- Current team: Betim Futebol

Youth career
- –2016: Cruzeiro

Senior career*
| Years | Team | Apps | (Gls) |
| 2017–2018 | Cruzeiro | 0 | (0) |
| 2017 | → Democrata-GV (loan) | 9 | (0) |
| 2017 | → Tupi (loan) | 20 | (3) |
| 2018 | → Remo (loan) | 2 | (0) |
| 2018 | → Tupi (loan) | 2 | (0) |
| 2018–2019 | Rudeš | 12 | (1) |
| 2019 | Ipatinga | 4 | (2) |
| 2019– | Betim Futebol | 29 | (6) |
| 2021 | → Pouso Alegre (loan) | 9 | (0) |
| 2021 | → Brusque (loan) | 0 | (0) |
- * Club domestic league appearances and goals as of 20:31, 29 May 2019 (UTC)

Andrey Falinski Rodrigues (born 18 March 1996), commonly known as Andrey, is a Brazilian footballer who currently plays as a midfielder for Betim Futebol.

== Career statistics ==
=== Club ===
As of 29 May 2019.

| Club | Season | League | | | State League | | Cup | | Continental | | Other | | Total | |
| Club | Season | Division | Apps | Goals | Apps | Goals | Apps | Goals | Apps | Goals | Apps | Goals | Apps | Goals |
|---|---|---|---|---|---|---|---|---|---|---|---|---|---|---|
| Cruzeiro | 2017 | Série A | 0 | 0 | 0 | 0 | 0 | 0 | 0 | 0 | 0 | 0 | 0 | 0 |
| Cruzeiro | 2018 | Série A | 0 | 0 | 0 | 0 | 0 | 0 | 0 | 0 | 0 | 0 | 0 | 0 |
| Cruzeiro | Total | | 0 | 0 | 0 | 0 | 0 | 0 | 0 | 0 | 0 | 0 | 0 | 0 |
| Democrata-GV (loan) | 2017 | – | | | 9 (Note: Appearances in the Campeonato Mineiro) | 0 | 0 | 0 | – | | 0 | 0 | 9 | 0 |
| Tupi (loan) | 2017 | Série C | 20 | 3 | 0 | 0 | 0 | 0 | – | | 0 | 0 | 20 | 3 |
| Remo (loan) | 2017 | Série C | 0 | 0 | 2 (Note: Appearances in the Campeonato Paraense) | 0 | 0 | 0 | – | | 0 | 0 | 2 | 0 |
| Tupi (loan) | 2018 | Série C | 2 | 0 | 0 | 0 | 0 | 0 | – | | 0 | 0 | 2 | 0 |
| Rudeš | 2018–19 | Croatian First League | 12 | 1 | – | | 0 | 0 | – | | 0 | 0 | 12 | 1 |
| Ipatinga | 2019 | – | | | 4 (Note: Appearances in the Campeonato Mineiro Module II) | 2 | 0 | 0 | – | | 0 | 0 | 4 | 2 |
| Career total | | | 34 | 4 | 15 | 2 | 0 | 0 | 0 | 0 | 0 | 0 | 49 | 6 |
