= Esquerdinha (footballer, born April 1984) =

Brazilian footballer

Personal information
- Full name: Gilvan Gomes Vieira
- Date of birth: 9 April 1984 (age 42)
- Place of birth: Pinheiro, Maranhão, Brazil
- Height: 1.74 m (5 ft 9 in)
- Position: Left winger

Team information
- Current team: Bragantino-PA

Youth career
- 2004–2005: URT

Senior career*
Years	Team	Apps	(Gls)
2005	Atlético Mineiro	4	(0)
2006	Dinamo Tbilisi	3	(0)
2006–2008	Zestaponi	42	(15)
2009	Jeju United	7	(0)
2010–2012	Huesca	71	(12)
2012–2014	Hércules	35	(6)
2013–2014	→ Eibar (loan)	26	(4)
2014–2016	Platanias	21	(3)
2016–2017	Sampaio Corrêa	22	(0)
2018	Remo	11	(1)
2019–	Bragantino-PA	8	(0)
- * Club domestic league appearances and goals as of 13:08, 2 September 2020 (UTC)

Gilvan Gomes Vieira, a.k.a. Esquerdinha (born 9 April 1984) is a Brazilian footballer who plays for Bragantino-PA as a left winger.

== Playing career ==
Gilvan played with the União Recreativa dos Trabalhadores and Atlético Mineiro in Brazil. In 2005, he had a fleeting passage through the Georgian football with Dinamo Tbilisi. With the Georgian Zestaponi had continuity and showed a high level. In 2008, he played the Europa League first qualifying round. In 2009, he played in the first Korean league. In the market for the 2009-10 winter spent two weeks doing a trial. The club told him that he would respond at a time, and therefore the player went to Bosnia to sign for a club. But he received the call affirmative Huesca. With Huesca gave a good level on the Spanish second level. Sergio Fernandez, director of sports of Hércules CF, marked his signing as a priority in the summer of 2011, but the agreement broke down the high pretensions of Huesca and being Hércules judicial intervened. In the winter transfer of this season, Hércules returned in their interest and achieved the signing of 150,000 euros transfer with a contract for 2 seasons and a half.
