= Araruama (footballer) =

Brazilian footballer (born 1989)

Personal information
- Full name: Marcos Vinícius Ribeiro Viana
- Date of birth: 15 April 1989 (age 37)
- Place of birth: Rio Bonito, Brazil
- Height: 1.76 m (5 ft 9 in)
- Position: Defensive midfielder

Youth career
- 2006–2009: Olaria

Senior career*
Years	Team	Apps	(Gls)
2009–2010	Olaria		
2010–2013	Botafogo	2	(0)
2012	→ Olaria (loan)		
2012	→ Joinville (loan)		
2012–2013	→ Bangu (loan)		
2013	→ Duque de Caxias (loan)		
2014	Ipatinga		
2015	Olaria		
2016–2018	Atlético Itapemirim		
2018–?	America-RJ		
- * Club domestic league appearances and goals

Marcos Vinicius Viana Ribeiro (born 15 April 1989), known as Araruama, is a Brazilian former professional footballer who played as a central midfielder.

== Career ==
Born in Araruama, Rio de Janeiro, Marcos Vinícius began playing football with local side Olaria where he made his professional debut in the Campeonato Carioca. In 2010, he signed with Botafogo, but suffered a shoulder injury that required surgery, leaving him sidelined for two months. Marcos Vinícius made his Campeonato Brasileiro Série A debut for Botafogo in July 2011, following an injury to regular starter Éverton.

== Career statistics ==
(Correct as of October 16, 2010)

Club	Season	State League		Brazilian Série A		Copa do Brasil		Copa Libertadores		Copa Sudamericana		Total	
Club	Season	Apps	Goals	Apps	Goals	Apps	Goals	Apps	Goals	Apps	Goals	Apps	Goals
Botafogo	2010	-	-	0	0	-	-	-	-	-	-	0	0
Total		-	-	0	0	-	-	-	-	-	-	0	0

== Honours ==
Atlético Itapemirim

- Copa Espírito Santo: 2016
- Campeonato Capixaba: 2017

Boavista

- Copa Rio: 2017

America

- Campeonato Carioca Série B1: 2018
