= Givanildo Oliveira =

Brazilian footballer (born 1948)

Personal information
- Full name: Givanildo José de Oliveira
- Date of birth: 8 August 1948 (age 78)
- Place of birth: Olinda, Brazil
- Position: Defensive midfielder

Youth career
- 1967–1969: Santa Cruz

Senior career*
Years	Team	Apps	(Gls)
1969–1976	Santa Cruz	119	(2)
1976–1977	Corinthians	21	(1)
1977–1979	Santa Cruz	60	(1)
1980	Fluminense	17	(0)
1980–1983	Sport	35	(0)
Total		252	(4)

International career
1976–1977	Brazil	6	(0)

Managerial career
- 1983–1984: Sport Recife
- 1984: Confiança
- 1984–1985: Central
- 1985: Náutico
- 1985–1986: ABC
- 1986–1987: CRB
- 1987–1988: Paysandu
- 1989–1990: Santa Cruz
- 1990: CSA
- 1990: Paysandu
- 1991: CSA
- 1991–1992: Sport Recife
- 1993: Central
- 1993: Ponte Preta
- 1993: Remo
- 1993: Bragantino
- 1994: CRB
- 1994: Náutico
- 1994: Ponte Preta
- 1994–1995: Sport Recife
- 1995: Guarani
- 1995–1996: Sport Recife
- 1996: Náutico
- 1997: Bahia
- 1997–1998: América Mineiro
- 1998–1999: Santa Cruz
- 2000–2002: Paysandu
- 2002: Náutico
- 2003: Remo
- 2004: Paysandu
- 2004: Fortaleza
- 2004: Paysandu
- 2004: Remo
- 2004–2006: Santa Cruz
- 2006: Atlético Paranaense
- 2006: Sport Recife
- 2007: Santa Cruz
- 2007: Vitória
- 2007: Brasiliense
- 2008: Paysandu
- 2008–2009: Vila Nova
- 2009: Mogi Mirim
- 2009: América Mineiro
- 2010: Sport Recife
- 2010: Santa Cruz
- 2010: Ponte Preta
- 2011: Remo
- 2011–2012: América Mineiro
- 2012: Paysandu
- 2012–2013: ABC
- 2013: Paysandu
- 2014: Treze
- 2014–2016: América Mineiro
- 2016: Náutico
- 2017: Ceará
- 2017: Santa Cruz
- 2018: Remo
- 2018–2019: América Mineiro
- * Club domestic league appearances and goals

Givanildo José de Oliveira (born 8 August 1948), sometimes known as just Givanildo, is a Brazilian retired football coach and former player who played as a defensive midfielder.

== Playing career ==
=== Club ===
Born in Olinda, Pernambuco, Givanildo Oliveira represented Santa Cruz as a youth and made his first team debut in 1969. A part of the club's five consecutive Campeonato Pernambucano titles, he also became team captain in the process.

In 1976 Givanildo Oliveira moved to Corinthians, but was sparingly used and subsequently returned to Santa in the following year. In 1980, after a short stint at Fluminense, he joined state rivals Sport, eventually retiring with the club in 1983 at nearly 35 years of age.

=== International ===
Givanildo Oliveira represented Brazil on 13 occasions (six of them official), with his debut occurring on 31 May 1976 in a 4–1 routing of Italy for the 1976 U.S.A. Bicentennial Cup Tournament.

== Managerial career ==
Givanildo Oliveira's first managerial job came on 1983 at Sport, immediately after retiring. His first accolade as a manager occurred in 1986, as he won the Campeonato Alagoano with CRB.

In 1987, while in charge of Paysandu, Givanildo Oliveira won the year's Campeonato Paraense, and subsequently returned to his first club Santa Cruz in 1989. He left the club in the following year, and was subsequently in charge of CSA (two stints), Paysandu, Sport (three stints), Central, Ponte Preta (two stints), Remo, Bragantino, CRB, Náutico (two stints), Guarani, Bahia and América Mineiro; with the latter he achieved promotion to the Série A in 1997.

In 1998, Givanildo Oliveira rejoined Santa after leaving América, and went back to Paysandu in April 2000, leading the latter club to the top tier in 2001 and winning the 2002 Copa dos Campeões, which qualified his side to the 2003 Copa Libertadores. He resigned in September 2002, and subsequently took over Náutico.

In April 2003, Givanildo Oliveira was named manager of Remo, and left the club in December. For the 2004 season, he was named manager five times in four clubs; starting with Paysandu, he only lasted one month before turning out to Fortaleza. He eventually returned to Papão in April, being dismissed in August and taking over Remo, but finished the campaign in charge of Santa Cruz.

Givanildo Oliveira remained in charge of Santa Cruz until April 2006, when he resigned to take over Atlético Paranaense. Dismissed in July, he led Sport to the second place of the Série B.

In 2007, Givanildo Oliveira had unassuming spells at Santa Cruz, Vitória and Brasiliense; at the latter, he was in charge for just three matches, all defeats. He returned to Paysandu for the 2008 season, but stepped down and took over Vila Nova in April, staying at the club until the following February.

On 17 March 2009, Givanildo Oliveira was appointed manager of Mogi Mirim, but moved to América Mineiro the following month. On 10 November, after winning the Série C with the latter, he took over Sport.

On 19 July 2010, Givanildo Oliveira returned to Santa. In September he resigned, and took over Ponte Preta on 25 October.

On 18 May 2011, Givanildo Oliveira rejoined Remo for a fourth spell. On 1 August he returned to América Mineiro, and subsequently took over Paysandu (two stints), ABC and Treze before rejoining the club on 17 September 2014.

On 3 June 2016, Givanildo Oliveira was sacked by América. On 5 September, he took over Náutico, but was dismissed on 2 December after failing to achieve promotion.

On 17 February 2017, Givanildo Oliveira was announced at Ceará. On 2 July he returned to Santa Cruz for a sixth spell, but was relieved from his duties on 27 August.

On 27 February 2018, Givanildo Oliveira rejoined Remo. Sacked on 27 May, he took over América Mineiro for the fifth time on 11 November.

== Coaching statistics ==
As of 15 April 2025

Coaching record by team and tenure
Team	Nat	From	To	Record								Ref
Team	Nat	From	To	G	W	D	L	GF	GA	GD	Win %	Ref
Sport Recife	(Brazil)	1 June 1983	16 May 1984	67	37	19	11	121	48	+73	55.22	
Confiança	(Brazil)	1 June 1984	30 November 1984	25	10	7	8	30	26	+4	40.00	
Central	(Brazil)	13 July 1984	24 June 1985	43	16	17	10	49	35	+14	37.21	
Náutico	(Brazil)	4 September 1985	13 December 1985	19	12	4	3	34	13	+21	63.16	
ABC	(Brazil)	15 December 1985	1 February 1986	3	1	2	0	4	1	+3	33.33	
CRB	(Brazil)	1 September 1986	20 May 1987	8	3	2	3	6	7	−1	37.50	
Paysandu	(Brazil)	1 June 1987	30 November 1988	37	22	9	6	59	22	+37	59.46	
Santa Cruz	(Brazil)	10 January 1989	30 May 1990	77	51	16	10	148	45	+103	66.23	
CSA	(Brazil)	1 September 1990	23 October 1991	4	1	2	1	4	4	+0	25.00	
Paysandu	(Brazil)	24 October 1991	30 November 1991	2	1	0	1	2	4	−2	50.00	
CSA	(Brazil)	14 January 1991	30 April 1991	18	7	6	5	14	13	+1	38.89	
Sport Recife	(Brazil)	17 May 1991	16 December 1992	102	57	30	15	201	70	+131	55.88	
Central	(Brazil)	1 February 1993	25 March 1993	5	0	3	2	3	9	−6	0.00	
Ponte Preta	(Brazil)	9 April 1993	10 May 1993	9	3	5	1	12	11	+1	33.33	
Remo	(Brazil)	12 May 1993	24 September 1993	5	3	0	2	8	10	−2	60.00	
Red Bull Bragantino	(Brazil)	27 September 1993	16 November 1993	10	2	5	3	16	14	+2	20.00	
Sport Recife	(Brazil)	1 May 1995	6 May 1996	59	28	16	15	100	50	+50	47.46	
Náutico	(Brazil)	10 May 1996	12 December 1996	32	13	7	12	48	41	+7	40.63	
Bahia	(Brazil)	8 January 1997	2 October 1997	53	25	15	13	93	69	+24	47.17	
América Mineiro	(Brazil)	3 October 1997	27 August 1998	48	21	11	16	75	59	+16	43.75	
Santa Cruz	(Brazil)	3 October 1998	15 December 1999	68	31	14	23	99	85	+14	45.59	
Paysandu	(Brazil)	10 January 2000	9 September 2002	161	84	44	33	284	155	+129	52.17	
Náutico	(Brazil)	12 September 2002	10 April 2003	16	5	5	6	27	23	+4	31.25	
Remo	(Brazil)	29 April 2003	18 December 2003	27	12	6	9	48	42	+6	44.44	
Paysandu	(Brazil)	19 December 2003	28 January 2004	2	0	1	1	2	3	−1	0.00	
Fortaleza	(Brazil)	29 January 2004	18 April 2004	28	14	11	3	51	27	+24	50.00	
Paysandu	(Brazil)	29 April 2004	1 August 2004	18	4	5	9	20	33	−13	22.22	
Remo	(Brazil)	17 August 2004	2 December 2004	6	2	0	4	10	18	−8	33.33	
Santa Cruz	(Brazil)	3 December 2004	19 March 2006	74	48	14	12	134	65	+69	64.86	
Athletico Paranaense	(Brazil)	20 March 2006	21 July 2006	14	4	3	7	17	17	+0	28.57	
Sport Recife	(Brazil)	1 August 2006	6 December 2006	24	12	5	7	38	23	+15	50.00	
Santa Cruz	(Brazil)	12 December 2006	25 February 2007	12	3	2	7	15	20	−5	25.00	
Vitória	(Brazil)	26 February 2007	27 July 2007	31	18	4	9	82	44	+38	58.06	
Brasiliense	(Brazil)	30 July 2007	30 September 2007	12	4	3	5	13	17	−4	33.33	
Vila Nova	(Brazil)	25 April 2008	16 March 2009	51	22	10	19	74	76	−2	43.14	
Mogi Mirim	(Brazil)	17 March 2009	10 April 2009	5	3	1	1	13	9	+4	60.00	
América Mineiro	(Brazil)	11 April 2009	9 November 2009	22	9	7	6	32	25	+7	40.91	
Sport Recife	(Brazil)	10 November 2009	26 May 2010	39	20	9	10	67	47	+20	51.28	
Santa Cruz	(Brazil)	19 July 2010	24 October 2010	12	6	2	4	16	15	+1	50.00	
Ponte Preta	(Brazil)	25 October 2010	2 December 2010	7	0	3	4	6	11	−5	0.00	
Remo	(Brazil)	18 May 2011	1 August 2011	2	1	0	1	1	2	−1	50.00	
América Mineiro	(Brazil)	2 August 2011	5 August 2012	59	25	13	21	94	89	+5	42.37	
Paysandu	(Brazil)	7 August 2012	16 October 2012	10	2	7	1	15	12	+3	20.00	
ABC	(Brazil)	17 October 2012	8 March 2013	19	7	5	7	28	24	+4	36.84	
Paysandu	(Brazil)	4 June 2013	28 July 2013	9	2	2	5	11	15	−4	22.22	
Treze	(Brazil)	6 May 2014	15 September 2014	21	5	8	8	22	28	−6	23.81	
América Mineiro	(Brazil)	17 September 2014	3 June 2016	94	45	28	21	129	86	+43	47.87	
Náutico	(Brazil)	5 September 2016	1 December 2016	15	9	2	4	20	12	+8	60.00	
Ceará	(Brazil)	17 February 2017	17 June 2017	19	10	6	3	25	13	+12	52.63	
Santa Cruz	(Brazil)	2 July 2017	27 August 2017	11	2	3	6	11	17	−6	18.18	
Remo	(Brazil)	1 March 2018	28 May 2018	25	13	3	9	31	24	+7	52.00	
América Mineiro	(Brazil)	11 November 2018	1 May 2019	22	9	5	8	30	27	+3	40.91	
Total				1,561	744	407	410	2,492	1,655	+837	47.66	—

== Honours ==
=== Player ===
Santa Cruz

- Campeonato Pernambucano: 1969, 1970, 1971, 1972, 1973, 1978, 1979

Corinthians

- Campeonato Paulista: 1977

Fluminense

- Campeonato Carioca: 1980

Sport

- Campeonato Pernambucano: 1980, 1981, 1982

=== Manager ===
CRB

- Campeonato Alagoano: 1986

Paysandu

- Campeonato Paraense: 1987, 1992, 2000, 2001, 2002
- Campeonato Brasileiro Série B: 2001
- Copa dos Campeões: 2002
- Copa Norte: 2002

CSA

- Campeonato Alagoano: 1990

Remo

- Campeonato Paraense: 1993, 1994, 2018

Sport

- Campeonato Pernambucano: 1992, 1994, 2010
- Copa do Nordeste: 1994

América Mineiro

- Campeonato Brasileiro Série B: 1997
- Campeonato Brasileiro Série C: 2009
- Campeonato Mineiro: 2016

Santa Cruz

- Campeonato Pernambucano: 2005

Vitória

- Campeonato Baiano: 2007

Ceará

- Campeonato Cearense: 2017

== See also ==
- List of football managers with the most matches
