= Victor Lindenberg =

Brazilian footballer

Personal information
- Full name: Victor Lindenberg Tavares Vieira
- Date of birth: 17 December 1997 (age 28)
- Place of birth: Rio de Janeiro, Brazil
- Height: 1.75 m (5 ft 9 in)
- Position: Left-back

Team information
- Current team: Dukagjini
- Number: 16

Youth career
- Flamengo
- –2019: Botafogo

Senior career*
Years	Team	Apps	(Gls)
2017–2019	Botafogo	1	(0)
2018	→ Paysandu (loan)	0	(0)
2018	→ Marcílio Dias (loan)	3	(1)
2019	→ Santa Cruz-RN (loan)	0	(0)
2019	→ Santa Cruz (loan)	6	(0)
2020	Anapolina	8	(0)
2020–2021	Moto Club de São Luís	2	(0)
2021	ABC	6	(0)
2021–	Dukagjini	1	(0)
- * Club domestic league appearances and goals as of 12 December 2021

Victor Lindenberg Tavares Vieira (born 17 December 1997), known as Victor Lindenberg, is a Brazilian footballer who plays as a left-back for Kosovan club Dukagjini.

== Club career ==
=== Early career ===
Lindenberg is a product of Botafogo's youth sector. He was sent out on loan to Paysandu in January 2018 until the summer. He then was loaned out once again to Marcílio Dias until the end of the year. After this loan spell, he was loaned out again, this time to Santa Cruz de Natal.

=== Dukagjini ===
On 1 December 2021, Lindenberg joined Football Superleague of Kosovo side Dukagjini. Four days later, he was named as a first team substitute for the first time in a league match against Llapi. His debut with Dukagjini came seven days later in a league match against Malisheva after being named in the starting line-up.

== Career statistics ==
=== Club ===
As of 12 December 2021

Appearances and goals by club, season and competition
Club	Season	League			State League		Cup		Total	
Club	Season	Division	Apps	Goals	Apps	Goals	Apps	Goals	Apps	Goals
Botafogo	2016	Série A	0	0	—		—		0	0
Botafogo	2017	Série A	1	0	—		—		1	0
Paysandu (loan)	2018	Série B	0	0	7	1	1 (Note: Appearance(s) in Copa Verde)	0	8	1
Marcílio Dias (loan)	2018	Catarinense Série B	3	1	—		—		3	1
Santa Cruz-RN (loan)	2019	Série D	0	0	11	0	2	0	13	0
Santa Cruz (loan)	2019	Série C	6	0	—		—		6	0
Santa Cruz (loan)	Total		10	1	18	1	3	0	31	2
Anapolina	2019	Campeonato Goiano	8	0	—		—		8	0
Moto Club de São Luís	2020	Série D	2	0	—		—		2	0
ABC	2021	Campeonato Potiguar	6	0	—		8 (Note: Seven appearances in Copa do Nordeste, one appearance in Copa do Brasil)	0	14	0
ABC	Total		16	0	0	0	8	0	24	1
Dukagjini	2021–22	Kosovo Superleague	1	0	—		0	0	1	0
Career total			27	1	18	1	11	0	56	2
