= Geandro =

Brazilian footballer (born 1987)

Personal information
- Full name: Geandro Augusto de Paula
- Date of birth: 26 November 1987 (age 38)
- Place of birth: Jacareí, Brazil
- Height: 1.79 m (5 ft 10 1/2 in)
- Position: Midfielder

Team information
- Current team: São Bernardo

Senior career*
| Years | Team | Apps | (Gls) |
| 2007 | Atlético Araçatuba | | |
| 2008 | Matsubara | | |
| 2009 | Nacional–PR | | |
| 2009 | Londrina | | |
| 2010 | Osvaldo Cruz | | |
| 2010 | Arapongas | | |
| 2011–2015 | São Miguel | | |
| 2011 | → Cianorte (loan) | | |
| 2011 | → Red Bull Brasil (loan) | | |
| 2012 | → Cianorte (loan) | | |
| 2013–2014 | → Bragantino (loan) | | |
| 2015 | → Joinville (loan) | | |
| 2016 | → Bragantino (loan) | | |
| 2016 | CRB | | |
| 2017– | São Bernardo | | |
- * Club domestic league appearances and goals as of 15 February 2017

Geandro Augusto de Paula (born November 26, 1987), known as Geandro, is a Brazilian footballer who plays for São Bernardo as midfielder.

== Career statistics ==
As of 13 March 2017

| Club | Season | League | | | State League | | Cup | | Conmebol | | Other | | Total | |
| Club | Season | Division | Apps | Goals | Apps | Goals | Apps | Goals | Apps | Goals | Apps | Goals | Apps | Goals |
|---|---|---|---|---|---|---|---|---|---|---|---|---|---|---|
| Osvaldo Cruz | 2010 | Paulista A2 | — | | 17 | 2 | — | | — | | — | | 17 | 2 |
| Red Bull Brasil | 2011 | Paulista A2 | — | | — | | — | | — | | 7 (Note: All appearance(s) in Copa Paulista) | 0 | 7 | 0 |
| Cianorte | 2011 | Série D | — | | 18 | 1 | — | | — | | — | | 18 | 1 |
| Cianorte | 2012 | Série D | 7 | 0 | 16 | 0 | — | | — | | — | | 2 | 0 |
| Cianorte | Subtotal | | 7 | 0 | 34 | 1 | — | | — | | — | | 41 | 1 |
| Bragantino | 2013 | Série B | 14 | 0 | 15 | 1 | 2 | 0 | — | | — | | 31 | 1 |
| Bragantino | 2014 | Série B | 23 | 3 | 13 | 0 | 5 | 0 | — | | — | | 41 | 3 |
| Bragantino | Subtotal | | 37 | 3 | 28 | 1 | 7 | 0 | — | | — | | 72 | 4 |
| Joinville | 2015 | Série A | — | | 8 | 0 | 1 | 0 | — | | — | | 9 | 0 |
| Bragantino | 2016 | Série B | — | | 10 | 0 | 1 | 0 | — | | — | | 11 | 0 |
| CRB | 2016 | Série B | 4 | 0 | — | | — | | — | | — | | 4 | 0 |
| São Bernardo | 2017 | Paulista | — | | 6 | 1 | — | | — | | — | | 6 | 1 |
| Career total | | | 48 | 3 | 103 | 5 | 9 | 0 | 0 | 0 | 7 | 0 | 167 | 8 |
