= Vacaria (footballer) =

Brazilian footballer

Personal information
- Full name: Roberto Zulian Junior
- Date of birth: April 4, 1994 (age 32)
- Place of birth: Vacaria, Brazil
- Height: 1.79 m (5 ft 10 in)
- Position: Defensive midfielder

Team information
- Current team: Pelotas

Youth career
- 2006–2011: Juventude

Senior career*
Years	Team	Apps	(Gls)
2012–2018	Juventude		
2017	→ Fortaleza (loan)	11	(0)
2018	→ Brasil de Pelotas (loan)	7	(0)
2018	→ Remo (loan)	5	(0)
2019	Remo	6	(0)
2019–	Pelotas		
- * Club domestic league appearances and goals

Roberto Zulian Junior (born April 4, 1994), commonly known as Vacaria, is a Brazilian footballer who plays as a defensive midfielder for Pelotas.
