= Renan Rocha =

Brazilian footballer

Personal information
- Full name: Renan Nelson Rocha
- Date of birth: 25 March 1987 (age 39)
- Place of birth: Piracicaba, Brazil
- Height: 1.94 m (6 ft 4 in)
- Position: Goalkeeper

Team information
- Current team: Inter-SM

Youth career
- XV de Piracicaba

Senior career*
Years	Team	Apps	(Gls)
2001	Santos	0	(0)
2001–2004	Rio Branco	23	(0)
2004–2013	Atlético Paranaense	23	(0)
2007	→ Colônia Work (loan)	0	(0)
2010	→ Vitória (loan)	0	(0)
2014	Atlético Paranaense B		
2015	Botafogo-SP	15	(0)
2015	América de Natal	0	(0)
2016	São Caetano	21	(0)
2016–2017	Red Bull Bragantino	44	(0)
2018	Paysandu	38	(0)
2019–2020	Boa Esporte	55	(0)
2019	→ São Bento (loan)	10	(0)
2021	São Luiz	11	(0)
2021	Manaus	7	(0)
2022	São Luiz	11	(0)
2022	XV de Piracicaba		
2022	Aparecida		
2023	Juventus	0	(0)
2023–	Inter-SM		
- * Club domestic league appearances and goals as of 11 March 2023

Renan Nelson Rocha (born 25 March 1987) is a Brazilian goalkeeper who plays for Inter-SM.
