= Leandro Brasília =

Brazilian footballer

Personal information
- Full name: Leandro de Medeiros Silva
- Date of birth: 21 January 1987 (age 39)
- Place of birth: Brasília, Brazil
- Height: 1.70 m (5 ft 7 in)
- Position: Midfielder

Team information
- Current team: Real Brasília

Senior career*
Years	Team	Apps	(Gls)
2007–2009	Cruzeiro		
2007–2008	→ Itaúna (loan)		
2008	→ América Mineiro (loan)		
2009	→ Ipatinga (loan)		
2009–2012	Ipatinga	87	(6)
2013	Linense	0	(0)
2013	Criciúma	14	(0)
2014	Ceará	4	(0)
2015	Mirassol	0	(0)
2015	CRB	24	(2)
2016	Linense	0	(0)
2016	Bragantino	5	(0)
2016	Linense	1	(0)
2017	Rio Preto	0	(0)
2017	Tupi	10	(2)
2018	Remo	14	(0)
2019	Tupi	0	(0)
2019	Internacional de Minas	0	(0)
2020	Villa Nova	0	(0)
2020–	Real Brasília	0	(0)
- * Club domestic league appearances and goals as of 18:26, 20 September 2020 (UTC)

Leandro de Medeiros Silva (born January 21, 1987, in Brasília), known as Leandro Brasília, is a Brazilian footballer who plays for Real Brasília as midfielder.

== Career statistics ==
As of 21 February 2017

Club	Season	League			State League		Cup		Conmebol		Other		Total	
Club	Season	Division	Apps	Goals	Apps	Goals	Apps	Goals	Apps	Goals	Apps	Goals	Apps	Goals
Ipatinga	2009	Série B	30	2	—		—		—		—		30	2
Ipatinga	2010	Série B	20	1	0	0	—		—		—		20	1
Ipatinga	2011	Série C	10	1	8	0	3	0	—		—		21	1
Ipatinga	2012	Série B	27	2	14	1	3	0	—		—		44	3
Ipatinga	Subtotal		87	6	22	1	6	0	—		—		115	7
Linense	2013	Paulista	—		19	5	—		—		—		19	5
Criciúma	2013	Série A	14	0	—		1	0	1 (Note: All appearance(s) in Copa Sudamericana)	0	—		16	0
Ceará	2014	Série B	4	0	5	0	1	0	—		8 (Note: All appearance(s) in Copa do Nordeste)	1	18	1
Mirassol	2015	Paulista A2	—		12	2	—		—		—		12	2
CRB	2015	Série B	24	2	—		1	0	—		—		25	2
Linense	2016	Série D	1	0	9	1	1	0	—		—		11	1
Bragantino	2016	Série B	5	0	—		—		—		1 (Note: All appearance(s) in Copa Paulista)	0	6	0
Rio Preto	2017	Paulista A2	—		4	0	—		—		—		4	0
Career total			135	8	71	9	10	0	1	0	9	1	226	18
