= Mimica (footballer) =

Brazilian footballer

Personal information
- Full name: Ademilson Silva Marques
- Date of birth: November 22, 1985 (age 40)
- Place of birth: São Luís, Brazil
- Height: 1.85 m (6 ft 1 in)
- Position: Centre back

Team information
- Current team: Altos

Senior career*
Years	Team	Apps	(Gls)
2004–2008	Chapadinha	-	(-)
2008	Sampaio Corrêa	-	(-)
2009	Botafogo-PB	-	(-)
2009	IAPE	-	(-)
2010	Sampaio Corrêa	4	(0)
2010	Vila Nova	12	(0)
2011	Sertãozinho	-	(-)
2011	Sampaio Corrêa	11	(0)
2012	Santa Cruz-RS	5	(0)
2012–2016	Sampaio Corrêa	79	(3)
2016	→ Confiança (loan)	8	(1)
2017	Confiança	26	(0)
2018–2021	Remo	73	(3)
2021–	Altos	11	(0)
- * Club domestic league appearances and goals as of 1 December 2021

Ademilson Silva Marques (born November 22, 1985, in São Luís), commonly known as Mimica, is a Brazilian footballer who plays as a centre back.

== Honours ==
Sampaio Corrêa

- Campeonato Maranhense: 2010, 2012, 2014
- Campeonato Brasileiro Série D: 2012

Confiança

- Campeonato Sergipano: 2017

Remo

- Campeonato Paraense: 2018, 2019
