= Luiz Gustavo (footballer, born 1999) =

Brazilian footballer

Personal information
- Full name: Luiz Gustavo Benmuyal Reis
- Date of birth: 2 September 1999 (age 27)
- Place of birth: Belém, Brazil
- Height: 1.75 m (5 ft 9 in)
- Position: Right-back

Team information
- Current team: Feirense
- Number: 2

Senior career*
Years	Team	Apps	(Gls)
2018	Remo	5	(1)
2018–2020	Cruzeiro	0	(0)
2020–2023	Arouca	6	(0)
2022	→ Pevidém (loan)	11	(0)
2022–2023	→ Gondomar (loan)	22	(0)
2023–2024	Sanjoanense	24	(1)
2024–2025	Paredes	12	(0)
2025–	Feirense	29	(0)
- * Club domestic league appearances and goals as of 19 June 2026

Luiz Gustavo Benmuyal Reis (born 2 September 1999), better known as just Luiz Gustavo, is a Brazilian professional footballer who plays as a right-back for Liga Portugal 2 club Feirense.

== Career ==
Luis Gustavo began his career in Brazil with Clube do Remo.He made his professional debut with Remo in a 1–0 Campeonato Brasileiro Série C win over Globo on 21 April 2018. From there, he moved to the reserves of Cruzeiro without making a senior appearance. On 4 June 2020, he transferred to the Portuguese club Arouca.

== Honours ==
Remo

- Campeonato Paraense: 2018
