= Associação Trairiense de Futebol =

Football club in Trairi, Brazil

Trairiense
- Full name: Associação Trairiense de Futebol
- Nickname(s): Lagosta Mecânica
- Founded: April 4, 2004
- Ground: Barrosão, Trairi, Ceará state, Brazil
- Capacity: 3,000
| Home colours | Away colours |

Associação Trairiense de Futebol, commonly known as Trairiense, is a Brazilian football club based in Trairi, Ceará state.

== History ==
The club was founded on December 22, 1999. They finished in the second position in the Campeonato Cearense Third Level in 2004, when they lost the competition to Crateús.

== Stadium ==
Associação Trairiense de Futebol play their home games at Estádio Manoel Barroso Neto, nicknamed Barrosão. The stadium has a maximum capacity of 3,000 people.
