= Emerson (footballer, born July 1983) =

Brazilian footballer

Personal information
- Full name: Emerson Feliciano De Barros Freitas Carvalho
- Date of birth: 22 July 1983 (age 43)
- Place of birth: Brazil
- Height: 1.86 m (6 ft 1 in)
- Position: Defender

Team information
- Current team: Juazeirense

Youth career
- 1994–2000: Portuguesa

Senior career*
Years	Team	Apps	(Gls)
2000–2004	Portuguesa		
2004	Juventus SP		
2004	Marília		
2005	CRB Alagoas		
2005	Santo André		
2006	Treze		
2006	Fortaleza	8	(0)
2007–2008	Estoril Praia	9	(0)
2008	América (RN)	9	(0)
2009	Caxias	4	(0)
2009	Campinense	11	(0)
2010	Uberlândia	10	(1)
2010	Bragantino	12	(1)
2011	Ypiranga	9	(0)
2011	Campinense		
2011	ASA	13	(2)
2012	Veranópolis	15	(0)
2012	CRAC	14	(1)
2013	São José	17	(2)
2013	Nacional AM	6	(0)
2014	Paulista	6	(0)
2014	Juventus SP	4	(1)
2014	Águia de Marabá	12	(0)
2015	Rio Branco	14	(0)
2016	Icasa	1	(0)
2016	Juazeirense	13	(2)
2016	Boa	2	(0)
2016	Zimbru Chișinău	4	(0)
2016	Almancilense	5	(1)
2017	Juazeirense	0	(0)
2017	Mogi Mirim	15	(2)
2018	Rio Preto	0	(0)
2018	Salgueiro	16	(3)
2019–	Juazeirense	2	(0)
- * Club domestic league appearances and goals as of 21:51, 19 May 2019 (UTC)

Emerson Feliciano De Barros Freitas Carvalho known as Emerson (born 22 July 1983) is a Brazilian footballer who plays for Juazeirense, as a defender.
