= Felipe Marques =

Brazilian footballer (born 1990)

Personal information
- Full name: Felipe Marques da Silva
- Date of birth: 27 January 1990 (age 36)
- Place of birth: Pacajus, Brazil
- Height: 1.66 m (5 ft 5 in)
- Position: Forward

Youth career
- 2008–2010: Horizonte

Senior career*
Years	Team	Apps	(Gls)
2010	Horizonte	0	(0)
2015	Itapipoca	9	(1)
2016–2019	Horizonte	31	(0)
2017	→ Sampaio Corrêa (loan)	26	(4)
2018	→ Remo (loan)	19	(3)
2018	→ Londrina (loan)	27	(8)
2019	→ Novorizontino (loan)	12	(1)
2019	→ Cuiabá (loan)	36	(5)
2020	Novorizontino	10	(0)
2020–2023	Cuiabá	81	(6)
2021	→ Ferroviária (loan)	11	(1)
2023	São Bernardo	14	(0)
2023	Novorizontino	24	(2)
2024	Portuguesa	10	(0)
- * Club domestic league appearances and goals as of 16:10, 18 March 2024 (UTC)

Felipe Marques da Silva (born 27 January 1990), known as Felipe Marques, is a Brazilian football player who plays as a forward.

== Career ==
Born in Pacajus, Ceará, Felipe Marques played amateur football in his hometown before joining the youth sides of Horizonte in 2008. After first appearing with the main squad in the 2010 Copa Fares Lopes, he opted to return to amateur football.

Felipe Marques only returned to professional football ahead of the 2015 season, after signing with Itapipoca. He then returned to Horizonte ahead of the 2016 season, helping in their promotion from the Campeonato Cearense Série B. After being a regular starter in the 2017 Campeonato Cearense, he moved on loan to Série C side Sampaio Corrêa, and helped the club in their promotion to the Série B.

On 28 November 2017, Felipe Marques was announced at third division side Remo for the upcoming season. The following 17 May, he was registered at Londrina in the second level.

A regular starter, Felipe Marques scored eight goals for LEC before moving to Novorizontino in January 2019. In April, he joined Cuiabá, and won the 2019 Copa Verde with the club.

Felipe Marques returned to Novorizontino on 3 January 2020, but rejoined Dourado on 22 July. He helped in the club's first-ever promotion to the Série A, before being loaned out to Ferroviária on 17 February 2021.

Back to Cuiabá in May 2021, Felipe Marques made his top tier debut at the age of 31 on 29 May, coming on as a late substitute for Jonathan Cafú in a 2–2 home draw against Juventude. He scored his first goal in the category on 18 July, netting his team's second in a 3–2 away win over Chapecoense.

On 18 November 2022, Felipe Marques left Cuiabá after four years, and agreed to a contract with São Bernardo on 23 December. On 6 April 2023, he returned to Novorizontino for a third spell.

On 19 December 2023, Felipe Marques was announced at Portuguesa for the 2024 Campeonato Paulista.

== Career statistics ==
As of 18 March 2024

Club	Season	League			State League		Cup		Continental		Other		Total	
Club	Season	Division	Apps	Goals	Apps	Goals	Apps	Goals	Apps	Goals	Apps	Goals	Apps	Goals
Horizonte	2010	Cearense	—		0	0	—		—		1 (Note: Appearance(s) in Copa Fares Lopes)	0	1	0
Itapipoca	2015	Cearense	—		9	1	—		—		—		9	1
Horizonte	2016	Cearense Série B	—		20	0	—		—		10	5	30	5
Horizonte	2017	Cearense	—		11	0	—		—		—		0	0
Horizonte	Total		—		31	0	—		—		10	5	41	5
Sampaio Corrêa (loan)	2017	Série C	20	2	6	2	—		—		—		26	2
Remo (loan)	2018	Série C	4	0	15	3	2	2	—		2 (Note: Appearance(s) in Copa Verde)	0	23	5
Londrina (loan)	2018	Série B	27	8	—		—		—		—		27	8
Novorizontino (loan)	2019	Paulista	—		12	1	—		—		—		12	1
Cuiabá (loan)	2019	Série B	36	5	—		—		—		4	0	40	5
Novorizontino	2020	Série D	0	0	10	0	1	0	—		—		11	0
Cuiabá	2020	Série B	27	4	—		—		—		3	1	30	5
Cuiabá	2021	Série A	30	2	—		—		—		—		30	2
Cuiabá	2022	Série A	24	0	9	4	4	0	4 (Note: Appearance(s) in Copa Sudamericana)	0	—		41	4
Cuiabá	Total		81	6	9	4	4	0	4	0	3	1	101	11
Ferroviária (loan)	2021	Série D	0	0	11	1	—		—		—		11	1
São Bernardo	2023	Série C	0	0	14	0	1	0	—		—		15	0
Novorizontino	2023	Série B	24	2	—		—		—		—		24	2
Portuguesa	2024	Paulista	—		10	0	—		—		—		10	0
Career total			192	23	127	12	8	2	4	0	20	6	351	43

== Honours ==
Horizonte

- Copa Fares Lopes: 2010

Sampaio Corrêa

- Campeonato Maranhense: 2017

Remo

- Campeonato Paraense: 2018

Cuiabá

- Copa Verde: 2019
- Campeonato Mato-Grossense: 2022
