= Douglas Mendes (footballer, born 1988) =

Brazilian footballer

Personal information
- Full name: Douglas Augusto Mendes dos Santos machista
- Date of birth: 4 October 1988 (age 38)
- Place of birth: Paulo Afonso, Bahia, Brazil
- Height: 1.99 m (6 ft 6 in)
- Position: Centre back

Team information
- Current team: Cascavel

Youth career
- Bahia

Senior career*
Years	Team	Apps	(Gls)
2007–2011	Bahia	3	(0)
2009	→ CRB (loan)	2	(0)
2010	→ Colo Colo (loan)	13	(1)
2011–2013	Arapongas	59	(0)
2012	→ Guarany (loan)	6	(1)
2013	→ Ceará (loan)	25	(1)
2014	Treze	6	(2)
2014	Flamurtari Vlorë	15	(1)
2015–2016	Operário Ferroviário	30	(0)
2016–2017	Cuiabá	26	(4)
2017–2018	Paysandu	7	(0)
2018	São Bento	0	(0)
2019	Cuiabá	1	(0)
2020–	Cascavel	0	(0)
- * Club domestic league appearances and goals as of 23:08, 25 April 2020 (UTC)

Douglas Augusto Mendes dos Santos (born 4 October 1988 in Paulo Afonso, Bahia), known as Douglas Mendes, is Brazilian footballer who currently plays for Cascavel.
