= Bruno Maia =

Brazilian footballer (born 1988)

Personal information
- Full name: Bruno Gonçalves Maia de Souza
- Date of birth: 19 April 1988 (age 38)
- Place of birth: Além Paraíba, Brazil
- Height: 1.88 m (6 ft 2 in)
- Position: Centre back

Team information
- Current team: Costa Rica EC

Youth career
- 2006–2007: Tupi
- 2007: Tupynambás

Senior career*
Years	Team	Apps	(Gls)
2008	Tupynambás	0	(0)
2008–2012	América Mineiro	1	(0)
2010	→ Mamoré (loan)	0	(0)
2011	→ Guarani (loan)	0	(0)
2012	→ Guarani-MG (loan)	10	(1)
2013	Red Bull Brasil	18	(0)
2013–2014	Avaí	53	(1)
2015	Mirassol	11	(0)
2015	América de Natal	0	(0)
2016	Capivariano	8	(2)
2016	Boa Esporte	17	(0)
2017	Botafogo-PB	28	(0)
2018	Remo	22	(0)
2019	Sertãozinho	14	(2)
2019	Boa Esporte	8	(0)
2020	Portuguesa	13	(1)
2020	Nacional-SP	4	(0)
2021–2022	Uberlândia	35	(0)
2022	Cerrado	6	(0)
2023	União Rondonópolis	26	(0)
2023	AA Araguaia	4	(0)
2024	Itapirense	4	(0)
2024	Juara	6	(0)
2025–	Costa Rica EC	6	(0)
- * Club domestic league appearances and goals as of 15:34, 8 August 2024 (UTC)

Bruno Gonçalves Maia de Souza (born 19 April 1988), known as Bruno Maia, is a Brazilian footballer who plays as a defender for Costa Rica EC

== Career statistics ==
As of 19 January 2017

Club	Season	League			State League		Cup		Conmebol		Other		Total	
Club	Season	Division	Apps	Goals	Apps	Goals	Apps	Goals	Apps	Goals	Apps	Goals	Apps	Goals
América–MG	2012	Série B	0	0	—		—		—		—		0	0
Guarani–MG	2012	Série D	—		10	1	—		—		—		10	1
Red Bull Brasil	2013	Paulista A2	—		18	0	—		—		—		18	0
Avaí	2013	Série B	31	1	—		—		—		—		31	1
Avaí	2014	Série B	8	0	12	0	2	0	—		—		22	0
Avaí	Subtotal		39	1	12	0	2	0	0	0	0	0	53	1
Mirassol	2015	Paulista A2	—		11	0	—		—		—		11	0
América–RN	2015	Série C	0	0	—		—		—		—		0	0
Capivariano	2016	Paulista	—		8	2	—		—		—		8	2
Boa Esporte	2016	Série C	17	0	—		—		—		—		17	0
Botafogo–PB	2017	Série C	—		2	0	—		—		—		2	0
Career total			56	1	61	3	2	0	0	0	0	0	119	4
