= Fernandes (footballer, born 1985) =

Brazilian footballer

Personal information
- Full name: Micerlanio Fernandes da Silva
- Date of birth: 24 April 1985 (age 41)
- Place of birth: Caaporã, Brazil
- Height: 1.75 m (5 ft 9 in)
- Position: Midfielder

Team information
- Current team: Remo

Senior career*
Years	Team	Apps	(Gls)
2006	Botafogo–PB		
2007–2009	Campinense		
2007	→ América–RN (loan)		
2010	Oeste		
2010–2013	São Caetano		
2012	→ Campinense (loan)		
2013	→ América–RN (loan)		
2013	→ Oeste (loan)		
2014	Oeste		
2014	Treze		
2015	XV de Piracicaba		
2015–2016	Paraná		
2017	Botafogo–PB		
2018–	Remo		
- * Club domestic league appearances and goals as of 3 March 2017

Micerlanio Fernandes da Silva (born April 24, 1985 in Caaporã), known as Fernandes, is a Brazilian footballer who plays for Remo as midfielder.

== Career statistics ==
As of 3 March 2017

Club	Season	League			State League		Cup		Conmebol		Other		Total	
Club	Season	Division	Apps	Goals	Apps	Goals	Apps	Goals	Apps	Goals	Apps	Goals	Apps	Goals
Campinense	2009	Série B	15	2	9	0	—		—		—		24	2
Oeste	2010	Série D	—		2	0	—		—		—		2	0
São Caetano	2010	Série B	24	3	12	2	—		—		—		36	5
São Caetano	2011	Série B	10	0	4	0	—		—		—		14	0
São Caetano	Subtotal		34	3	16	2	—		—		—		50	5
Campinense	2012	Série D	12	1	—		—		—		—		12	1
América–RN	2013	Série B	—		—		—		—		6 (Note: Appearances in Copa do Nordeste)	0	6	0
Oeste	2013	Série B	24	1	11	1	—		—		—		35	2
Oeste	2014	Série B	—		5	0	—		—		—		5	0
Oeste	Subtotal		24	1	16	1	—		—		—		40	2
Treze	2014	Série C	12	0	9	1	3	0	—		—		24	1
XV de Piracicaba	2015	Paulista	—		9	0	—		—		—		9	0
Paraná	2015	Série B	31	0	—		—		—		—		31	0
Paraná	2016	Série B	20	1	12	0	2	0	—		—		34	1
Paraná	Subtotal		51	1	12	0	2	0	—		—		65	1
Botafogo–PB	2017	Série C	—		5	0	1	0	—		4	1	10	1
Career total			148	8	78	4	6	0	0	0	10	1	242	13
