= Diogão =

Stadium in Bragança, Pará, Brazil

- Interactive map of Diogão
- Full name: Estádio Olímpico São Benedito
- Location: Bragança, Pará, Brazil
- Coordinates: 1°3′42″S 46°47′54″W
- Owner: José Diogo
- Capacity: 11,000
- Surface: Grass
- Field size: 105 x 68 m

Construction
- Opened: 1919

Tenants
- Bragantino; Caeté

Estádio Olímpico São Benedito or Diogão, as it is usually called, is a stadium located in Bragança, Brazil. It is used mostly for football matches and hosts the home matches of Bragantino and Caeté. The stadium has a maximum capacity of 11,000 people.
