= Adenilson =

Brazilian footballer (born 1992)

Personal information
- Full name: Adenilson Martins do Carmo Nascimento
- Date of birth: 9 March 1992 (age 34)
- Place of birth: Salvador, Brazil
- Height: 1.84 m (6 ft 0 in)
- Position: Midfielder

Team information
- Current team: Cascavel

Youth career
- 2010: Vitória
- 2010: Palmas
- 2011: Confiança
- 2011: Lemense

Senior career*
Years	Team	Apps	(Gls)
2011–2013	Grêmio Osasco		
2013	→ Osasco (loan)		
2013–2014	Chiangrai United		
2014	Sumaré		
2015	Lemense		
2015–2016	Guarani de Juazeiro	21	(3)
2016	Uniclinic	5	(0)
2016–2017	Guarani de Juazeiro	15	(2)
2017–2019	Fortaleza	26	(0)
2018	→ Remo (loan)	15	(1)
2019	→ América de Natal (loan)	29	(4)
2020	FC Cascavel	14	(3)
2020–2021	Londrina	45	(8)
2021–2022	Al Dhaid		
2022–2023	Flamengo (PE)	45	(8)
2023–	Cascavel	0	(0)
- * Club domestic league appearances and goals as of 22 April 2019

Adenilson Martins do Carmo Nascimento (born 9 March 1992), known as Adenilson, is a Brazilian footballer who plays for Cascavel as a midfielder.

== Career statistics ==
As of 22 April 2019

Club	Season	League			State League		Cup		Continental		Other		Total	
Club	Season	Division	Apps	Goals	Apps	Goals	Apps	Goals	Apps	Goals	Apps	Goals	Apps	Goals
Guarani de Juazeiro	2015	Série D	6	1	—		—		—		—		6	1
Guarani de Juazeiro	2016	Série D	—		15	3	—		—		—		15	3
Guarani de Juazeiro	Subtotal		6	1	15	3	—		—		—		21	4
Uniclinic	2016	Série D	5	0	—		—		—		—		5	0
Guarani de Juazeiro	2017	Série D	—		13	2	2	0	—		—		15	2
Fortaleza	2017	Série C	14	0	—		—		—		—		14	0
Remo	2018	Série C	4	0	—		1	0	—		2 (Note: All appearance(s) in Copa Verde)	0	7	0
América de Natal	2019	Série D	—		16	2	2	0	—		—		18	2
Career total			29	1	44	7	5	0	0	0	2	0	80	8
