= Nando Carandina =

Brazilian footballer

Personal information
- Full name: Fernando Gasparini Carandina
- Date of birth: 30 April 1990 (age 36)
- Place of birth: Araras, Brazil
- Height: 1.73 m (5 ft 8 in)
- Position: Midfielder

Team information
- Current team: Santo André

Youth career
- 2008–2009: Rio Claro

Senior career*
Years	Team	Apps	(Gls)
2010	Taquaritinga	0	(0)
2010	Desportivo Brasil	0	(0)
2011	Sertãozinho	0	(0)
2012	Rio Claro	0	(0)
2012	Grêmio Barueri	0	(0)
2013	Rio Claro	37	(1)
2013	Mogi Mirim	6	(0)
2014	Rio Claro	13	(0)
2014	Oeste	4	(0)
2014	São Caetano	1	(0)
2015	Rio Claro	10	(1)
2015–2017	Red Bull Brasil	34	(2)
2018	Paysandu	44	(0)
2019	São Bernardo	13	(0)
2019	Novorizontino	6	(0)
2020–	Santo André	8	(0)
- * Club domestic league appearances and goals as of 13:39, 17 July 2020 (UTC)

Fernando Gasparini Carandina (born 30 April 1990), commonly known as Nando Carandina, is a Brazilian professional footballer who plays as a defensive midfielder for Santo André.

== Career statistics ==
As of 5 February 2017

Club	Season	League			State League		Cup		Continental		Other		Total	
Club	Season	Division	Apps	Goals	Apps	Goals	Apps	Goals	Apps	Goals	Apps	Goals	Apps	Goals
Taquaritinga	2010	Paulista A2	—		9	2	—		—		—		9	2
Desportivo Brasil	2010	Paulista B	—		19	1	—		—		—		19	1
Rio Claro	2012	Paulista A2	—		18	1	—		—		—		18	1
Rio Claro	2013	Paulista A2	—		19	0	—		—		—		19	0
Rio Claro	2014	Paulista	—		13	0	—		—		—		13	0
Rio Claro	2015	Paulista	—		10	1	—		—		—		10	1
Rio Claro	Subtotal		—		60	4	—		—		—		60	4
Mogi Mirim	2013	Série C	6	0	—		—		—		—		6	0
Oeste	2014	Série B	4	0	—		—		—		—		4	0
São Caetano	2014	Série C	1	0	—		—		—		—		1	0
Red Bull Brasil	2015	Série D	6	0	—		—		—		—		6	0
Red Bull Brasil	2016	Paulista	—		13	0	2	0	—		14 (Note: All appearance(s) in Copa Paulista)	0	29	0
Red Bull Brasil	2017	Paulista	—		1	0	—		—		—		1	0
Red Bull Brasil	Subtotal		6	0	14	0	2	0	—		14	0	36	0
Career total			17	0	102	5	2	0	0	0	14	0	135	5
