= Isac (footballer) =

Brazilian footballer (born 1985)

Personal information
- Full name: Isac Daniel Santiago
- Date of birth: June 8, 1985 (age 41)
- Place of birth: Fortaleza, Ceará, Brazil
- Height: 1.83 m (6 ft 0 in)
- Position: Forward

Team information
- Current team: Luverdense

Senior career*
Years	Team	Apps	(Gls)
2006	Bahia		
2006	Horizonte		
2007	Ceará		
2007	Icasa		
2008	Icasa	21	(3)
2008	Eusébio	10	(6)
2009	Eusébio		
2009	Social	3	(0)
2009	Icasa	5	(1)
2009	Iporá	8	(5)
2010	Itapipoca	9	(3)
2010	Horizonte	5	(3)
2011	Parnahyba		
2011	Horizonte	26	(9)
2011	Guarany de Sobral	5	(2)
2012	América-RN	50	(26)
2013	Changchun Yatai	29	(7)
2014	América-RN	32	(4)
2015	Red Bull Brasil	8	(1)
2015	CRB	9	(1)
2016	Inter de Lages	16	(7)
2016	Botafogo-SP	16	(4)
2017	Horizonte	8	(5)
2017	Sampaio Corrêa	27	(13)
2018–	Remo	29	(10)
- * Club domestic league appearances and goals as of May 21, 2018

Isac Félix da Silva (born June 8, 1985), or simply Isac, is a Brazilian professional footballer who plays as a forward for Remo.

== Career ==
Born in Ceará, Isac played mainly for clubs from his home state in the first years of his career. In 2008, he was runner-up of Campeonato Cearense, Ceará's most important competition, playing for Icasa.

Isac joined Campeonato Brasileiro Série B club América (RN) in 2012. That became one of the best years of his career, since he ended the season in second place in the race for the golden boot, scoring 20 goals in 35 matches, 7 goals behind Criciúma's Zé Carlos. Some months later, in February 2013, both Isac and Zé Carlos transferred to Chinese Super League side Changchun Yatai.

=== Inter de Lages ===
In December 2015, Inter de Lages announced it had signed Isac. Playing for Inter de Lages in Campeonato Catarinense, Santa Catarina's state championship in 2016, he would eventually finish as the competition's third best scorer of that year.

== Honours ==
América (RN)

- Campeonato Potiguar: 2012
- Campeonato Potiguar: 2014

Sampaio Corrêa (MA)

- Campeonato Maranhense: 2017
