= Clube de Esportes União ABC =

Brazilian football club

União ABC
- Full name: Clube de Esportes União ABC
- Founded: January 19, 1998 (27 years ago)
- Ground: Estádio das Moreninhas
- Capacity: 3,500
- President: Fábio Henrique Vicente da Silva
- Head coach: Robert
- League: Campeonato Sul-Mato-Grossense Série B
- 2022: Sul-Mato-Grossense, 10th of 10 (relegated)
Home colors	Away colors

Clube de Esportes União ABC, commonly known as União ABC, is a Brazilian football club based in Campo Grande, Mato Grosso do Sul state.

== Stadium ==
União ABC play their home games at Estádio das Moreninhas. The stadium has a maximum capacity of 3,500 people.
