= Cassiano (footballer, born 1989) =

Brazilian footballer

Personal information
- Full name: Cassiano Dias Moreira
- Date of birth: 16 June 1989 (age 37)
- Place of birth: Porto Alegre, Brazil
- Height: 1.85 m (6 ft 1 in)
- Position: Forward

Team information
- Current team: Casa Pia
- Number: 90

Youth career
- 2005–2008: São José
- 2012: Internacional S-23

Senior career*
Years	Team	Apps	(Gls)
2009–2012	São José	22	(2)
2010	→ Internacional B (loan)		
2011	→ Glória (loan)		
2011–2012	→ Nea Salamis (loan)		
2012	→ Esportivo (loan)		
2012–2017	Internacional	21	(4)
2013	→ Criciúma (loan)	15	(0)
2014	→ Santa Cruz (loan)	8	(4)
2015	→ Fortaleza (loan)	12	(3)
2015	→ Gwangju FC (loan)	11	(1)
2016	→ Goiás (loan)	13	(2)
2017	→ Aktobe (loan)	12	(1)
2017	Brasil de Pelotas	17	(4)
2018	Paysandu	10	(6)
2018	Heilongjiang	5	(0)
2019	CSA	10	(0)
2019–2020	Boavista	27	(2)
2020–2022	Vizela	59	(23)
2022–2023	Al-Faisaly	17	(7)
2023–2024	Estoril	44	(9)
2024	Avaí	8	(0)
2024–	Casa Pia	57	(16)
- * Club domestic league appearances and goals as of 18 May 2026

Cassiano Dias Moreira (born June 16, 1989 in Porto Alegre), or simply Cassiano, is a Brazilian footballer who plays as a forward for Portuguese club Casa Pia.

== Career ==
=== Club ===
In January 2017, Cassiano joined FC Aktobe on loan.

On 30 June 2017, Casino joined Grêmio.

On 4 August 2022, Cassiano joined Saudi Arabian club Al-Faisaly on a one-year deal with the option to extend for a further year.

On 26 January 2023, Cassiano joined Estoril on a one-and-a-half-year contract.

== Career statistics ==
As of 21 May 2023

Appearances and goals by club, season and competition
Club	Season	League			State League		National Cup		League Cup		Continental		Other		Total	
Club	Season	Division	Apps	Goals	Apps	Goals	Apps	Goals	Apps	Goals	Apps	Goals	Apps	Goals	Apps	Goals
São José	2009	Gaúcho	—		4	1	—		—		—		—		4	1
São José	2010	Série D	6	0	11	1	—		—		—		—		17	1
São José	2011	Gaúcho	—		1	0	—		—		—		—		1	0
São José	Total		6	0	16	2	—		—		—		—		22	2
Internacional	2012	Série A	17	3	—		—		—		—		—		17	3
Internacional	2013	Série A	2	0	2	1	—		—		—		—		4	1
Internacional	Total		19	3	2	1	—		—		—		—		21	4
Criciúma (loan)	2013	Série A	12	0	—		2	0	—		1	0	—		15	0
Santa Cruz (loan)	2014	Série B	8	1	5	1	—		—		—		6	2	19	4
Fortaleza (loan)	2015	Série C	2	0	10	3	4	0	—		—		5	1	21	4
Gwangju FC (loan)	2015	K League Classic	11	1	—		—		—		—		—		11	1
Goiás (loan)	2016	Série B	13	2	6	0	1	0	—		—		—		20	2
Aktobe (loan)	2017	Kazakhstan Premier League	12	1	—		1	0	—		—		—		13	1
Brasil de Pelotas	2017	Série B	17	4	—		—		—		—		—		17	4
Paysandu	2018	Série B	10	6	11	5	1	0	—		—		8	9	30	20
Heilongjiang Lava Spring	2018	China League One	5	0	—		—		—		—		—		5	0
CSA	2019	Série A	10	0	2	1	—		—		—		5	0	17	1
Boavista	2019–20	Primeira Liga	27	2	—		1	0	0	0	—		—		28	2
Vizela	2020–21	Liga Portugal 2	34	16	—		2	0	—		—		—		36	16
Vizela	2021–22	Primeira Liga	25	7	—		4	1	1	1	—		—		30	9
Vizela	Total		59	23	—		6	1	1	1	—		—		66	25
Al-Faisaly	2022–23	Saudi First Division League	17	7	—		—		—		—		—		17	7
Estoril	2022–23	Primeira Liga	15	2	—		—		—		—		—		15	2
Career total			243	52	52	13	16	1	1	1	1	0	24	12	337	79

== Honours ==
Esportivo

- Campeonato Gaúcho Série A2: 2012

Internacional

- Campeonato Gaúcho: 2013

Fortaleza

- Campeonato Cearense: 2015

Goiás

- Campeonato Goiano: 2016

Paysandu

- Copa Verde: 2018
