= Mateus Müller =

Brazilian footballer

Personal information
- Full name: Mateus Müller de Souza Lopes
- Date of birth: November 18, 1995 (age 30)
- Place of birth: Jataí, Brazil
- Height: 1.81 m (5 ft 11 in)
- Position: Left-back

Youth career
- 2011–2012: Desportivo Brasil
- 2013–2014: Palmeiras

Senior career*
Years	Team	Apps	(Gls)
2014–2017	Palmeiras	0	(0)
2015	→ Remo (loan)	5	(0)
2016	→ São Bento (loan)	2	(0)
2016	→ Náutico (loan)	15	(1)
2017	→ São Bento (loan)	1	(0)
2017	→ Vila Nova (loan)	10	(0)
2018–2019	Estoril	0	(0)
2018	→ Paysandu (loan)	13	(0)
2019	Jataiense		
2020	Ríver	0	(0)
- * Club domestic league appearances and goals as of 15:02, 24 February 2020 (UTC)

Mateus Müller de Souza Lopes (born November 11, 1995), commonly known as Mateus Müller, is a Brazilian professional footballer who plays as a left-back.

== Honours ==
Paysandu

- Copa Verde: 2018
