= Mangueirão =

Football stadium in Brazil

Estádio Olímpico do Pará
- Mangueirão
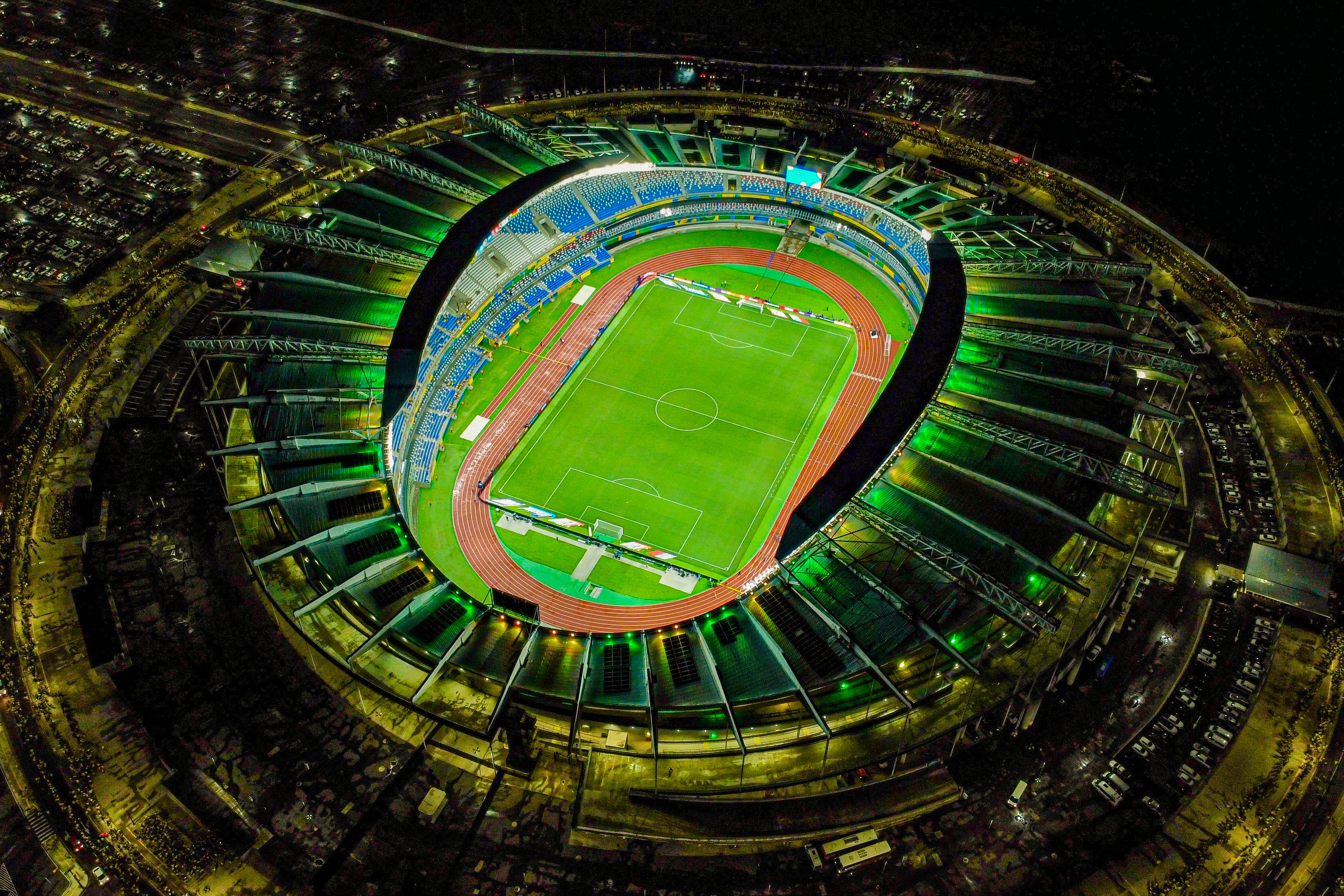
- Sisbrace
- Interactive map of Estádio Olímpico do Pará
- Full name: Estádio Estadual Jornalista Edgar Augusto Proença
- Former names: Estádio Olímpico do Pará Alacid Nunes
- Location: Belém, Pará, Brazil
- Coordinates: 1°22′52.0″S 48°26′38.4″W
- Owner: State of Pará
- Capacity: 53,645
- Surface: Grass
- Record attendance: 65,000 (Remo v Paysandu, 11 July 1999) (Primeira Reforma) 54,864 (Remo v São Bernardo, 29 September 2024) (Capacidade Atual)
- Field size: 105 x 68 m

Construction
- Groundbreaking: 1971
- Built: 1971–1978
- Opened: 4 March 1978
- Renovated: 2002, 2023
- Expanded: 2002, 2023
- Architect: Alcyr Meira

Tenants
- Paysandu; Remo; Tuna Luso

The Estádio Estadual Jornalista Edgar Proença, also known as Estádio Olímpico do Pará, and popularly called Mangueirão, is a football stadium in Belém, Pará, Brazil. It has a current seated capacity of 53,645, making it the eighth-largest football stadium in Brazil by capacity. The stadium is mainly used for football matches between the major football clubs in Pará, including Paysandu, Remo and Tuna Luso.

== History ==
=== Construction ===
The Mangueirão stadium architectural project is from August 1969. The stadium was designed by Alcyr Meira, a local architect. The Pará State Governor of that time, Alacid Nunes, ordered a 120,000 people football stadium construction project. The works started in 1970, when were built the ditch, the field and the general bleachers. A year later, the project was changed, and the stadium maximum capacity was reduced from 120,000 to 70,000. In 1971 the construction works restarted, with the construction of the first structural module. The stadium had its first stage of construction completed in 1978.

The Mangueirão remained unfinished for many years and was nicknamed "bandola" for having only one side of the bleachers covered and painted in a marajoara motif.

=== Opening ===
The opening match was played on 4 March 1978, when a Pará All-Stars team beat a Youngsters Uruguay national team 4–0. The first goal of the stadium was scored by Pará's Mesquita. Earlier, in an unofficial opening, Remo beat Operário 2–0.

=== First reform ===
In 2000, the Mangueirão underwent renovations for the completion of the bleachers and the inclusion of an athletics track that lasted until 2002. At the stadium's reinauguration, on 5 May 2002, Paysandu and Remo tied 2–2 in a match valid for the Campeonato Paraense. The official name of the stadium was changed to the journalist Edgar Augusto Proença.

From 2002 to 2009, the Mangueirão hosted the Grande Prêmio Brasil Caixa de Atletismo, with a record attendance in Latin America in 2005, with more than 40,000 spectators for this sport category.

The biggest attendance that the stadium received after its first renovation was 57,930, on 15 May 2003, when Paysandu lost to Boca Juniors in a match valid for the Copa Libertadores.

=== Second reform ===
On 23 February 2021, a general renovation and expansion of the stadium was announced by the state government. Some FIFA standard modifications would be implemented, besides the addition of a control center for the Video assistant referee.

Close to the reopening, the stadium hosted two test events, with games between Remo and Paysandu valid for the semi-finals of the 2023 Copa Verde, on March 26 and 29, respectively. The official reopening took place on 9 April, in a derby match valid for the last round of Campeonato Paraense, with a 1–0 victory for Paysandu.

== Brazil national football team ==
Date	Time (UTC–3)	Team #1	Res.	Team #2	Round	Attendance
8 November 1990	Undisclosed	Brazil	0–0	Chile	Friendly	33,664
9 October 1997	Undisclosed	Brazil	2–0	Morocco	Friendly	Undisclosed
12 October 2005	21:30	Brazil	3–0	Venezuela	2006 FIFA World Cup qualification	47,000
28 September 2011	21:50	Brazil	2–0	Argentina	2011 Superclásico de las Américas	45,000
8 September 2023	21:45	Brazil	5–1	Bolivia	2026 FIFA World Cup qualification	43,188

== Notable events ==
=== Sports ===
Date	Event
2002–2009	Grande Prêmio Brasil Caixa de Atletismo
2 February 2025	2025 Supercopa do Brasil

=== Concerts ===
Date	Artist	Tour / Concert name
July 3, 2023	Thiaguinho	Tardezinha Tour
July 16, 2023	Alok	New Experience Festival
November 18, 2023	Gusttavo Lima	Buteco Tour
November 24, 2023	Joelma	Isso é Calypso Tour
December 16, 2023	Psica Festival	
May 11, 2024	Só Pra Contrariar	O Último Encontro Tour

== See also ==
- All-seater stadium
- List of stadiums by capacity
- List of football (soccer) stadiums by capacity
