= Bragantino Clube do Pará =

Brazilian association football club based in Bragança, Pará, Brazil

Bragantino
- Full name: Bragantino Clube do Pará
- Nickname: Tubarão do Caeté (Caeté's Shark)
- Founded: 29 January 1993; 33 years ago
- Ground: Diogão
- Capacity: 7,500
- President: Cláudio Wagner
- Head coach: Rogerinho Gameleira
- League: Campeonato Paraense
- 2023: Paraense, 10th of 12
- Website: https://www.facebook.com/Bragantinoclubedoparaoficial/
Home colors	Away colors

Bragantino Clube do Pará, commonly referred to as Bragantino, is a Brazilian professional club based in Bragança, Pará founded on 29 January 1993. It competes in the Campeonato Paraense, the top flight of the Pará state football league.

== Stadium ==
Bragantino play their home games at Diogão. The stadium has a maximum capacity of 5,000 people.

== Rivalries ==
Bragantino's biggest rival is Caeté. The duel between the two clubs is called the Clássico da Farinha (Flour derby).

== Honours ==
- Campeonato Paraense Second Division
  - Winners (3): 2002, 2011, 2017
- Taça ACLEP
  - Winners (1): 2007
