= 2025 Clube do Remo season =

2025 season of Brazilian association football team

Remo
2025 season
- President: Antônio Carlos Teixeira
- Head coach: Rodrigo Santana (until 13 March 2025); Daniel Paulista (until 6 June 2025); António Oliveira (until 21 September 2025); Guto Ferreira
- Stadium: Baenão; Mangueirão
- Campeonato Brasileiro Série B: 4th (promoted)
- Campeonato Paraense: 1st
- Copa do Brasil: Second round
- Copa Verde: Round of 16
- Highest home attendance: 47,572 v Goiás (23 November 2025, Série B)
- Lowest home attendance: 9,242 v Athletico Paranaense (9 October 2025, Série B)
Home colors	Away colors	Third colors

The 2025 season was the 112th in Remo's existence. This season Remo participated in the Campeonato Brasileiro Série B, the Campeonato Paraense, the Copa do Brasil and the Copa Verde.

Remo won promotion to the Campeonato Brasileiro Série A after finishing Série B in 4th place. The club's last participation in the first division had been in 1994. In the Campeonato Paraense, they were crowned champions after beating their rivals Paysandu 6–5 on penalties, following a 3–3 draw on aggregate.

In the Copa do Brasil, Remo were eliminated in the second round after losing 2–1 to Criciúma. In the Copa Verde, they were eliminated in the round of 16 after drawing 1–1 with São Raimundo-RR and losing 4–3 on penalties.

== Players ==
=== Squad information ===
As of 23 November 2025

Notes:

- Numbers in parentheses denote appearances as substitute.
- Y – Youth players to have featured in a first-team appearance for Remo.

Squad Number	Position	Nat.	Name	Date of Birth (Age)		
Squad Number	Position	Nat.	Name	Date of Birth (Age)	Apps	Goals
2	DF	BRA	Pedro Costa	17 August 1993 (aged 32)	4 (9)	0
4	DF	BRA	William Klaus	11 January 1994 (aged 31)	36 (1)	1
5	MF	BRA	Luan Martins	20 October 1999 (aged 26)	11 (3)	1
6	DF	BRA	Jorge	28 March 1996 (aged 29)	6 (3)	0
7	MF	BRA	Giovanni Pavani	22 November 1996 (aged 29)	23 (12)	2
8	MF	BRA	Nathan	13 March 1996 (aged 29)	2 (8)	0
10	MF	BRA	Jáderson	12 August 2000 (aged 25)	32 (8)	3
11	MF	BRA	Pedro Castro	5 February 1993 (aged 32)	23 (18)	1
16	DF	BRA	Sávio	26 May 1995 (aged 30)	33 (2)	2
17	DF	URU	Cristian Tassano	23 July 1996 (aged 29)	2 (1)	0
20	MF	COL	Víctor Cantillo	15 October 1993 (aged 32)	6 (2)	0
21	DF	PAR	Alan Rodríguez	15 August 2000 (aged 25)	13 (5)	0
22	MF	BRA	Régis	30 November 1992 (aged 32)	1 (16)	1
23	DF	BRA	Nathan Santos	5 September 2001 (aged 24)	11	0
25	FW	URU	Nicolás Ferreira	7 February 2002 (aged 23)	14 (2)	2
26	FW	BRA	Marrony	5 February 1999 (aged 26)	11 (6)	2
27	DF	BRA	Kayky Almeida	1 May 2005 (aged 20)	12 (3)	0
28	MF	BRA	Yago Ferreira	2 August 2001 (aged 24)	0	0
29	DF	BRA	Reynaldo	3 January 1997 (aged 28)	32 (6)	2
30	GK	BRA	Léo Lang	5 August 1998 (aged 27)	3 (1)	0
31	MF	BRA	Dodô	5 September 1994 (aged 31)	11 (8)	3
32	FW	BRA	Pedro Rocha	1 October 1994 (aged 31)	39 (5)	19
33	FW	URU	Diego Hernández	22 June 2000 (aged 25)	11 (3)	3
34	MF	BRA	Caio Vinícius	11 January 1999 (aged 26)	31 (1)	6
35	MF	BRA	Freitas	4 March 2003 (aged 22)	0 (4)	0
39	FW	BRA	Eduardo Melo	13 May 2001 (aged 24)	2 (4)	1
45	FW	GNB	João Pedro	13 November 1996 (aged 29)	7 (6)	4
48	MF	BRA	Nathan Camargo	25 July 2005 (aged 20)	7 (6)	0
54	DF	BRA	Kawan	10 April 2003 (aged 22)	0	0
77	MF	GRE	Panagiotis Tachtsidis	15 February 1991 (aged 34)	8 (1)	1
79	DF	BRA	Marcelinho	20 July 1998 (aged 27)	29 (9)	2
88	GK	BRA	Marcelo Rangel	17 May 1988 (aged 37)	50	0
91	FW	BRA	PH Gama	30 June 1999 (aged 26)	0 (2)	0
94	GK	BRA	Ygor Vinhas	15 April 1994 (aged 31)	0 (2)	0
98	MF	BRA	Madison	8 July 1998 (aged 27)	0 (2)	0
99	FW	BRA	Janderson	26 February 1999 (aged 26)	17 (16)	2
—	FW	BRA	Tico (Y)	21 September 2006 (aged 19)	0 (1)	0
Out on loan
8	MF	BRA	Dener	13 March 1992 (aged 33)	5 (2)	1
13	DF	BRA	Kadu (Y)	16 August 2005 (aged 20)	9 (10)	0
14	DF	ARG	Iván Alvariño	1 February 2001 (aged 24)	7 (7)	0
23	MF	BRA	Guty	26 June 2003 (aged 22)	1 (3)	0
38	DF	BRA	Rafael Castro	26 September 1996 (aged 29)	9 (3)	0
46	DF	BRA	Edson Kauã (Y)	29 January 2004 (aged 21)	2 (1)	0
86	DF	BRA	Jonílson	18 January 2002 (aged 23)	0	0
—	MF	BRA	Henrique	20 January 2002 (aged 23)	0	0
—	FW	BRA	Felipinho	19 August 2003 (aged 22)	0	0
—	FW	BRA	Ronald	10 August 2002 (aged 23)	0	0
Players left the club during the playing season
3	DF	BRA	Camutanga	27 September 1993 (aged 31)	10 (4)	0
6	MF	BRA	Daniel Cabral	14 May 2002 (aged 23)	0 (5)	0
8	FW	BRA	Matheus Davó	16 August 1999 (aged 26)	8 (4)	2
9	FW	BRA	Felipe Vizeu	12 March 1997 (aged 28)	14 (12)	3
15	FW	BRA	Adaílton	6 December 1990 (aged 34)	11 (19)	6
17	FW	BRA	Gabryel Martins	12 December 2001 (aged 23)	0 (3)	0
19	FW	BRA	Ytalo	12 January 1988 (aged 37)	9 (7)	3
20	DF	BRA	Thalys	14 January 2000 (aged 25)	0 (1)	0
77	FW	BRA	Maxwell	11 February 1995 (aged 30)	6 (9)	4
93	DF	BRA	Lucão	10 July 1993 (aged 31)	5	1
—	MF	BRA	Paulinho Curuá	11 May 1997 (aged 27)	0	0

=== Top scorers ===
As of 23 November 2025

Place	Position	Name	Campeonato Brasileiro Série B	Campeonato Paraense	Copa do Brasil	Copa Verde	Total
1	FW	Pedro Rocha	15	3	1	0	19
2	FW	Adaílton	1	4	0	1	6
2	MF	Caio Vinícius	5	1	0	0	6
4	FW	João Pedro	4	0	0	0	4
4	FW	Maxwell	0	3	1	0	4
6	FW	Diego Hernández	3	0	0	0	3
6	FW	Felipe Vizeu	1	2	0	0	3
6	FW	Ytalo	0	1	2	0	3
6	MF	Jáderson	1	1	1	0	3
6	MF	Dodô	0	3	0	0	3
11	FW	Nicolás Ferreira	2	0	0	0	2
11	FW	Marrony	2	0	0	0	2
11	FW	Matheus Davó	2	0	0	0	2
11	FW	Janderson	0	2	0	0	2
11	MF	Giovanni Pavani	2	0	0	0	2
11	DF	Marcelinho	2	0	0	0	2
11	DF	Sávio	1	1	0	0	2
11	DF	Reynaldo	2	0	0	0	2
19	FW	Eduardo Melo	1	0	0	0	1
19	MF	Régis	1	0	0	0	1
19	MF	Panagiotis Tachtsidis	1	0	0	0	1
19	MF	Pedro Castro	1	0	0	0	1
19	MF	Luan Martins	1	0	0	0	1
19	MF	Dener	0	1	0	0	1
19	DF	William Klaus	0	1	0	0	1
19	DF	Lucão	0	1	0	0	1
Own goals			3	0	0	0	3

=== Disciplinary record ===
As of 23 November 2025

Position	Name	Campeonato Brasileiro Série B		Campeonato Paraense		Copa do Brasil		Copa Verde		Total	
Position	Name	Yellow card	Red card	Yellow card	Red card	Yellow card	Red card	Yellow card	Red card	Yellow card	Red card
FW	Pedro Rocha	6	1	0	0	0	0	0	0	6	1
MF	Jáderson	1	0	0	0	0	0	2	1	3	1
FW	Diego Hernández	3	1	0	0	0	0	0	0	3	1
MF	Régis	1	1	0	0	0	0	0	0	1	1
FW	Nicolás Ferreira	0	1	0	0	0	0	0	0	0	1
MF	Giovanni Pavani	8	0	4	0	1	0	1	0	14	0
DF	Marcelinho	8	0	3	0	0	0	0	0	11	0
DF	Reynaldo	4	0	4	0	0	0	0	0	8	0
MF	Caio Vinícius	7	0	1	0	0	0	0	0	8	0
MF	Luan Martins	7	0	0	0	0	0	0	0	7	0
DF	Camutanga	5	0	0	0	0	0	0	0	5	0
DF	Alan Rodríguez	4	0	1	0	0	0	0	0	5	0
DF	William Klaus	2	0	1	0	2	0	0	0	5	0
FW	Felipe Vizeu	2	0	2	0	0	0	0	0	4	0
DF	Kayky Almeida	3	0	0	0	0	0	0	0	3	0
MF	Pedro Castro	3	0	0	0	0	0	0	0	3	0
FW	Janderson	3	0	0	0	0	0	0	0	3	0
FW	Marrony	3	0	0	0	0	0	0	0	3	0
DF	Sávio	2	0	0	0	0	0	0	0	2	0
DF	Kawan	2	0	0	0	0	0	0	0	2	0
DF	Kadu	1	0	1	0	0	0	0	0	2	0
MF	Nathan Camargo	2	0	0	0	0	0	0	0	2	0
MF	Nathan	2	0	0	0	0	0	0	0	2	0
MF	Dodô	1	0	1	0	0	0	0	0	2	0
GK	Marcelo Rangel	1	0	1	0	0	0	0	0	2	0
DF	Cristian Tassano	1	0	0	0	0	0	0	0	1	0
DF	Nathan Santos	1	0	0	0	0	0	0	0	1	0
DF	Iván Alvariño	0	0	1	0	0	0	0	0	1	0
DF	Rafael Castro	0	0	1	0	0	0	0	0	1	0
DF	Pedro Costa	1	0	0	0	0	0	0	0	1	0
MF	Víctor Cantillo	1	0	0	0	0	0	0	0	1	0
MF	Dener	0	0	1	0	0	0	0	0	1	0
MF	Guty	0	0	1	0	0	0	0	0	1	0
FW	João Pedro	1	0	0	0	0	0	0	0	1	0
FW	Matheus Davó	1	0	0	0	0	0	0	0	1	0
FW	Eduardo Melo	1	0	0	0	0	0	0	0	1	0
FW	Adaílton	0	0	0	0	1	0	0	0	1	0
FW	Gabryel Martins	0	0	0	0	1	0	0	0	1	0
GK	Ygor Vinhas	1	0	0	0	0	0	0	0	1	0
GK	Léo Lang	1	0	0	0	0	0	0	0	1	0
	TOTALS	90	4	23	0	5	0	3	1	121	5

== Kit ==
Supplier: Volt Sport / Main sponsor: Banpará, ObaBet

Home	Home alt. 1	Home alt. 2	Away	Away alt. 1	Away alt. 2	Third (until 5 August 2025)	Third

== New contracts and transfers ==
=== New contracts ===
Position	Name	Type	Source
DF	Thalys	Contract extension	
DF	Rafael Castro	Contract extension	
GK	Marcelo Rangel	Contract extension	
GK	Léo Lang	Contract extension	
MF	Giovanni Pavani	Contract extension	
FW	Ytalo	Contract extension	

=== Transfers in ===
Position	Name	From	Type	Source
MF	Jáderson	(Brazil) Athletico Paranaense	Transfer	
DF	Sávio	(Portugal) Rio Ave	Transfer	
MF	Dodô	(Kuwait) Kazma	Transfer	
DF	Marcelinho	(Brazil) Chapecoense	Transfer	
DF	Lucão	(Indonesia) Barito Putera	Transfer	
MF	Dener	Free agent	Transfer	
FW	Maxwell	(Brazil) Operário Ferroviário	Transfer	
FW	Pedro Rocha	(Brazil) Fortaleza	Transfer	
DF	Iván Alvariño	(Argentina) Boca Juniors	Transfer	
FW	Adaílton	(Japan) Ventforet Kofu	Transfer	
MF	Pedro Castro	(Brazil) Avaí	Transfer	
DF	Reynaldo	(Brazil) Coritiba	Transfer	
FW	Felipe Vizeu	(Brazil) Criciúma	Transfer	
DF	William Klaus	(Greece) Iraklis	Transfer	
DF	Alan Rodríguez	(Argentina) Rosario Central	Transfer	
FW	Gabryel Martins	(Bahrain) Al-Muharraq	Transfer	
GK	Ygor Vinhas	(Brazil) Água Santa	Transfer	
FW	Janderson	(Brazil) Ceará	Loan	
MF	Daniel Cabral	(Portugal) Estrela da Amadora	Loan	
MF	Caio Vinícius	(Brazil) Vitória	Transfer	
DF	Camutanga	(Brazil) Vitória	Loan	
MF	Luan Martins	(Brazil) Primavera	Loan	
MF	Régis	(Brazil) Goiás	Transfer	
FW	PH Gama	(Brazil) Santa Rosa	Loan	
DF	Pedro Costa	(Brazil) Tombense	Loan	
MF	Madison	(Brazil) ABC	Transfer	
FW	Matheus Davó	(Brazil) Mirassol	Transfer	
FW	Marrony	(Denmark) Midtjylland	Transfer	
DF	Kayky Almeida	(Brazil) Fluminense	Loan	
MF	Freitas	(Brazil) Fluminense	Loan	
MF	Víctor Cantillo	(Argentina) Huracán	Transfer	
DF	Kawan	(Brazil) Botafogo	Loan	
MF	Nathan Camargo	(Brazil) Red Bull Bragantino	Loan	
DF	Nathan Santos	(Brazil) Santos	Loan	
FW	Diego Hernández	(Brazil) Botafogo	Loan	
FW	Nicolás Ferreira	(Uruguay) Montevideo Wanderers	Loan	
DF	Cristian Tassano	(Portugal) Feirense	Transfer	
FW	Eduardo Melo	(Brazil) Criciúma	Transfer	
MF	Yago Ferreira	(Brazil) Fluminense	Loan	
FW	João Pedro	(Vietnam) Hà Nội	Transfer	
MF	Panagiotis Tachtsidis	(Romania) CFR Cluj	Transfer	
DF	Jorge	Free agent	Transfer	
MF	Nathan	(Brazil) Grêmio	Transfer	

=== Transfers out ===
Position	Name	To	Type	Source
MF	Henrique	(Brazil) São Joseense	Loan	
FW	Ronald	(Brazil) São Joseense	Loan	
FW	Felipinho	(Brazil) São Bento	Loan	
MF	Paulinho Curuá	(Brazil) Grêmio Prudente	Loan	
MF	Paulinho Curuá	(Brazil) Portuguesa	Transfer	
MF	Henrique	(Brazil) Sergipe	Loan	
FW	Felipinho	(Brazil) Luverdense	Loan	
MF	Dener	(Brazil) Volta Redonda	Loan	
DF	Lucão	(Indonesia) Persik Kediri	End of contract	
DF	Jonílson	(Brazil) Tuna Luso	Loan	
DF	Edson Kauã	(Brazil) XV de Piracicaba	Loan	
FW	Ronald	(Brazil) Izabelense	Loan	
FW	Gabryel Martins	(Brazil) Ypiranga	Transfer	
FW	Ytalo	(Brazil) ABC	Transfer	
MF	Guty	(Brazil) Primavera	Loan	
DF	Thalys	(Brazil) Vila Nova	Contract termination	
DF	Kadu	(Brazil) Botafogo	Loan	
FW	Maxwell	(Indonesia) Persija Jakarta	Transfer	
FW	Adaílton	(Japan) Yokohama FC	Transfer	
MF	Daniel Cabral	(Brazil) Volta Redonda	End of contract	
DF	Iván Alvariño	(Brazil) Amazonas	Loan	
DF	Rafael Castro	(Brazil) Londrina	Loan	
FW	Felipe Vizeu	(Peru) Sporting Cristal	Contract termination	
DF	Camutanga	(Brazil) Vitória	Loan return	
FW	Matheus Davó	(Israel) Maccabi Netanya	Transfer	

Notes

1. After returning on loan from Grêmio Prudente, the player was sold to Portuguesa.
2. After returning on loan from São Joseense, the player was loaned to Sergipe.
3. After returning on loan from São Bento, the player was loaned to Luverdense.
4. After returning on loan from São Joseense, the player was loaned to Izabelense.
5. Following Lucão's release, he later signed for Persik Kediri.
6. Following Thalys' release, he later signed for Vila Nova.

== Competitions ==
Competition	First match	Last match	Starting round	Final position	Record							
Competition	First match	Last match	Starting round	Final position	Pld	W	D	L	GF	GA	GD	Win %
Campeonato Brasileiro Série B	6 April 2025	23 November 2025	Matchday 1	4th	38	16	14	8	51	39	+12	42.11
Campeonato Paraense	18 January 2025	11 May 2025	League phase	Winners	12	8	2	2	24	8	+16	66.67
Copa do Brasil	26 February 2025	11 March 2025	First round	Second round	2	1	0	1	5	2	+3	50.00
Copa Verde	6 February 2025		Round of 16	Round of 16	1	0	1	0	1	1	+0	0.00
Total					53	25	17	11	81	50	+31	47.17

Source: Competitions

=== Campeonato Brasileiro Série B ===
Win Draw Loss

==== League table ====
Pos	Team	Pld	W	D	L	GF	GA	GD	Pts	Promotion or relegation
2	Athletico Paranaense (P)	38	19	8	11	53	43	+10	65	Promotion to 2026 Campeonato Brasileiro Série A
3	Chapecoense (P)	38	18	8	12	52	35	+17	62	Promotion to 2026 Campeonato Brasileiro Série A
4	Remo (P)	38	16	14	8	51	39	+12	62	Promotion to 2026 Campeonato Brasileiro Série A
5	Criciúma	38	17	10	11	47	33	+14	61	
6	Goiás	38	17	10	11	42	37	+5	61	

Source: CBF
Rules for classification: 1) points; 2) wins; 3) goal difference; 4) goals scored; 5) head-to-head results (only between 2 teams); 6) fewest red cards; 7) fewest yellow cards; 8) drawing of lots.
(P) Promoted

==== Results by round ====
Round	1	2	3	4	5	6	7	8	9	10	11	12	13	14	15	16	17	18	19	20	21	22	23	24	25	26	27	28	29	30	31	32	33	34	35	36	37	38
Ground	A	H	A	H	A	H	H	A	H	A	H	A	H	A	H	A	H	H	A	H	A	H	A	H	A	A	H	A	H	A	H	A	H	A	H	A	A	H
Result	D	W	D	W	D	W	W	D	D	L	W	L	L	W	D	D	D	W	D	L	W	D	D	L	W	D	L	L	W	W	W	W	W	W	D	D	L	W
Position	9	6	7	4	9	3	2	3	2	6	5	7	8	5	5	5	5	5	5	6	5	5	6	6	5	7	8	12	8	8	7	6	4	3	3	3	6	4
Points	1	4	5	8	9	12	15	16	17	17	20	20	20	23	24	25	26	29	30	30	33	34	35	35	38	39	39	39	42	45	48	51	54	57	58	59	59	62

A = Away; H = Home; W = Win; D = Draw; L = Loss

==== Matches ====
6 April 2025 1	Ferroviária	1–1	Remo	Araraquara
19:00 UTC−3	Lucas Rodrigues (yellow card) 84'; Ronaldo Alves (yellow card) 88'; Carlão 90+4'	Report	Felipe Vizeu 38'; Rodríguez (yellow card) 77'	Stadium: Fonte Luminosa; Attendance: 1,526; Referee: Lucas Casagrande

13 April 2025 2	Remo	2–0	América Mineiro	Belém
16:00 UTC−3	Pedro Rocha 12', 47'; Pavani (yellow card) 37'; Felipe Vizeu (yellow card) 70'; Luan Martins (yellow card) 90+4'	Report	Miquéias (yellow card) 8'	Stadium: Mangueirão; Attendance: 23,765; Referee: Paulo Belence Alves dos Prazeres Filho

17 April 2025 3	Botafogo-SP	2–2	Remo	Ribeirão Preto
20:00 UTC−3	Jefferson Nem 10'; Rafael Milhorim (yellow card) 32' (yellow-red card) 42'; Dramisino 46'; Jeferson (yellow card) 70'; Edson (yellow card) 89'	Report	Luan Martins (yellow card) 26'; Pedro Rocha 45+3'; Rodríguez (yellow card) 72'; Pavani 84'	Stadium: Estádio Santa Cruz; Attendance: 1,766; Referee: Lucas Guimarães Rechatiko Horn

21 April 2025 4	Remo	1–0	Coritiba	Belém
21:30 UTC−3	Marcelinho (yellow card) 21'; Pedro Rocha 45+2'; Rodríguez (yellow card) 87'	Report	Lucas Ronier (yellow card) 15'; Gómez (yellow card) 19'	Stadium: Mangueirão; Attendance: 17,223; Referee: Lucas Canetto Bellote

25 April 2025 5	Criciúma	1–1	Remo	Criciúma
19:00 UTC−3	Rodrigo (yellow card) 25'; Everton Morelli 46', (yellow card) 66'; Gui Lobo (yellow card) 90+6'	Report	Marcelinho (yellow card) 33'; Pavani (yellow card) 37'; Reynaldo 90+2'	Stadium: Estádio Heriberto Hülse; Attendance: 8,332; Referee: Lucas Paulo Torezin

3 May 2025 6	Remo	1–0	Amazonas	Belém
16:00 UTC−3	Pavani 19', (yellow card) 28'; Caio Vinícius (yellow card) 47'; Felipe Vizeu (yellow card) 60'	Report	Alyson (yellow card) 8' (yellow-red card) 57'; Jackson (yellow card) 9'	Stadium: Mangueirão; Attendance: 31,351; Referee: Luciano da Silva Miranda Filho

14 May 2025 7	Remo	2–0	Vila Nova	Belém
19:00 UTC−3	Marcelinho 34'; Camutanga (yellow card) 49'; Régis 78'; Reynaldo (yellow card) 90+1'	Report	Gustavo Pajé (yellow card) 73'	Stadium: Mangueirão; Attendance: 20,986; Referee: Bruno Pereira Vasconcelos

18 May 2025 8	Atlético Goianiense	1–1	Remo	Goiânia
16:00 UTC−3	Conrado (yellow card) 61'; Sandro Lima 90+5'	Report	Marcelinho (yellow card) 38'; Pedro Rocha 52'; Régis (yellow card) 90+9'	Stadium: Estádio Antônio Accioly; Attendance: 6,811; Referee: Thaillan Azevedo Gomes

24 May 2025 9	Remo	1–1	Volta Redonda	Belém
18:00 UTC−3	Pedro Rocha 34'; Kadu (yellow card) 49'; Pavani (yellow card) 87'; Dodô (yellow card) 90+3'	Report	Sanchez 30'; Heliardo (yellow card) 62'; Pierre (yellow card) 66'; Ynaiã (yellow card) 85'	Stadium: Mangueirão; Attendance: 30,965; Referee: Jefferson Ferreira de Moraes

1 June 2025 10	CRB	2–0	Remo	Maceió
18:00 UTC−3	Mikael 9', (yellow card) 41'; Danielzinho (yellow card) 43'; Segovia 61'; Fernando Henrique (yellow card) 89'	Report		Stadium: Estádio Rei Pelé; Attendance: 7,742; Referee: Arthur Gomes Rabelo

8 June 2025 11	Remo	2–1	Operário Ferroviário	Belém
19:00 UTC−3	Janderson (yellow card) 56'; Klaus (yellow card) 58'; Reynaldo 66', (yellow card) 90+8'; Luan Martins (yellow card) 87'; Sávio 90'	Report	Joseph (yellow card) 22'; Boschilia (yellow card) 27'; Rodrigo Rodrigues 48'; Miranda (yellow card) 90+5'	Stadium: Mangueirão; Attendance: 22,246; Referee: André Luiz Skettino Policarpo Bento

14 June 2025 12	Athletico Paranaense	2–1	Remo	Curitiba
18:30 UTC−3	Giuliano 54' (pen.); Alan Kardec 90', (yellow card) 90+1'	Report	Adaílton 1'; Reynaldo (yellow card) 36'; Rodríguez (yellow card) 60'	Stadium: Arena da Baixada; Attendance: 12,484; Referee: Sávio Sampaio

21 June 2025 13	Remo	0–1	Paysandu	Belém
18:30 UTC−3	Luan Martins (yellow card) 28'; Pedro Costa (yellow card) 50'; Camutanga (yellow card) 65'	Report	Leandro Vilela (yellow card) 18'; Diogo Oliveira (yellow card) 21', (goal) 72'; Marlon (yellow card) 39'; Anderson Leite (yellow card) 90+3'	Stadium: Mangueirão; Attendance: 45,544; Referee: Rafael Rodrigo Klein

29 June 2025 14	Athletic	1–2	Remo	São João del-Rei
16:00 UTC−3	Jhonatan (yellow card) 36'; Ronaldo Tavares 70'; Amorim (yellow card) 73'; Adriel (yellow card) 76'	Report	Reynaldo (yellow card) 37'; Pedro Rocha 78' (pen.), 90+4'; Luan Martins (yellow card) 81'; Camutanga (yellow card) 90+2'; Janderson (yellow card) 90+5'	Stadium: Estádio Joaquim Portugal; Attendance: 1,872; Referee: Gustavo Ervino Bauermann

5 July 2025 15	Remo	0–0	Cuiabá	Belém
16:00 UTC−3	Pedro Castro (yellow card) 40'; Pavani (yellow card) 86'	Report	Lucas Mineiro (yellow card) 19'; Alan Empereur (yellow card) 20'; Bruno Alves (yellow card) 38'; Marcelo (yellow card) 45+1'; Alisson Safira (yellow card) 60'; De Lucca (yellow card) 82'; Calebe (yellow card) 82'	Stadium: Mangueirão; Attendance: 21,533; Referee: Fábio Augusto Santos Sá Júnior

13 July 2025 16	Chapecoense	1–1	Remo	Chapecó
18:30 UTC−3	Carvalheira 46'; Clar (yellow card) 58'; João Paulo (yellow card) 66'; Bruno Matias (red card) 70'; Giovanni Augusto (yellow card) 78'	Report	Luan Martins (yellow card) 76', (goal) 90+4'; Marcelinho (yellow card) 86'; Pavani (yellow card) 90+10'	Stadium: Arena Condá; Attendance: 7,487; Referee: Márcio dos Santos Oliveira

17 July 2025 17	Remo	1–1	Novorizontino	Belém
21:35 UTC−3	Matheus Davó 10'; Marcelinho (yellow card) 35'; Pedro Rocha (yellow card) 47'; Camutanga (yellow card) 53'	Report	Matheus Frizzo (yellow card) 14'; Jean Irmer (yellow card) 20'; Robson 45'	Stadium: Mangueirão; Attendance: 18,974; Referee: Afro Rocha de Carvalho Filho

24 July 2025 18	Remo	2–1	Avaí	Belém
21:35 UTC−3	Pedro Rocha (yellow card) 5', (goal) 45+1' (pen.); Matheus Davó 29'; Cantillo (yellow card) 72'; Pavani (yellow card) 90+2'	Report	Emerson Ramon 2'; JP (yellow card) 70'; Jonathan Costa (red card) 78'	Stadium: Mangueirão; Attendance: 19,411; Referee: Emerson Ricardo de Almeida Andrade

28 July 2025 19	Goiás	1–1	Remo	Goiânia
21:35 UTC−3	Thiago Rodrigues (yellow card) 32'; Anselmo Ramon 90'	Report	Pedro Rocha 15'; Marrony (yellow card) 24'; Régis (red card) 45+1'; Marcelo Rangel (yellow card) 65'	Stadium: Estádio da Serrinha; Attendance: 11,142; Referee: Felipe Fernandes de Lima

1 August 2025 20	Remo	0–2	Ferroviária	Belém
19:00 UTC−3	Pedro Rocha (yellow card) 14' (yellow-red card) 60'	Report	Ricardinho (yellow card) 10'; Ronaldo 45+3'; Juninho 54'	Stadium: Mangueirão; Attendance: 23,013; Referee: Jefferson Ferreira de Moraes

9 August 2025 21	América Mineiro	0–1	Remo	Belo Horizonte
16:00 UTC−3	Stênio (yellow card) 87'	Report	Marrony 4' (pen.); Camutanga (yellow card) 67'; Nathan Santos (yellow card) 79'	Stadium: Arena Independência; Attendance: 4,061; Referee: Wagner do Nascimento Magalhães

16 August 2025 22	Remo	1–1	Botafogo-SP	Belém
16:00 UTC−3	Caio Vinícius 27', (yellow card) 55'; Pedro Rocha (yellow card) 44'	Report	Jeferson (yellow card) 26'; Jefferson Nem 49'; Edson (yellow card) 52'	Stadium: Mangueirão; Attendance: 32,123; Referee: Bruno Pereira Vasconcelos

23 August 2025 23	Coritiba	0–0	Remo	Curitiba
16:00 UTC−3	Gómez (yellow card) 37'; Josué (yellow card) 49'; Pedro Morisco (red card) 55'; Lucas Ronier (yellow card) 90+14'	Report	Marrony (yellow card) 42'; Matheus Davó (yellow card) 65'; Eduardo Melo (yellow card) 83'; Sávio (yellow card) 87'	Stadium: Estádio Couto Pereira; Attendance: 33,679; Referee: Jefferson Ferreira de Moraes

28 August 2025 24	Remo	0–1	Criciúma	Belém
21:35 UTC−3		Report	Léo Naldi (yellow card) 26'; Luiz Henrique (yellow card) 42'; Léo Mana (yellow card) 45'; Diego Gonçalves (yellow card) 58'; Marcinho (yellow card) 80'; Borasi (yellow card) 86'; Jean Carlos 90+9' (pen.)	Stadium: Mangueirão; Attendance: 15,356; Referee: André Luiz Skettino Policarpo Bento

5 September 2025 25	Amazonas	1–3	Remo	Manaus
17:00 UTC−3	Vásquez (yellow card) 22'; Erick Varão (yellow card) 36'; Rafael Tavares (yellow card) 45+1'; Luan Silva 89'	Report	Pedro Rocha 24', 67'; Caio Vinícius (yellow card) 31'; Pavani (yellow card) 74'; Klaus (yellow card) 82'; Marrony 90+5'	Stadium: Estádio Municipal Carlos Zamith; Attendance: 5,116; Referee: Matheus Delgado Candançan

13 September 2025 26	Vila Nova	1–1	Remo	Goiânia
18:30 UTC−3	Guilherme Parede (yellow card) 31'; Gabriel Poveda 56'; Gustavo Pajé (yellow card) 90+3'	Report	Júnior Todinho 83' (o.g.); Sávio (yellow card) 87'	Stadium: Estádio Onésio Brasileiro Alvarenga; Attendance: 5,709; Referee: Jonathan Benkenstein Pinheiro

20 September 2025 27	Remo	0–1	Atlético Goianiense	Belém
20:30 UTC−3	Pedro Rocha (yellow card) 21'; Ygor Vinhas (yellow card) 22'; Jáderson (yellow card) 38'; Nathan (yellow card) 55'	Report	Guilherme Romão 13', (yellow card) 64'; Ronald (yellow card) 41'; Kauan (yellow card) 41'; Radsley (yellow card) 90+1'	Stadium: Baenão; Attendance: 14,032; Referee: Felipe Fernandes de Lima

24 September 2025 28	Volta Redonda	2–1	Remo	Volta Redonda
21:30 UTC−3	Vitinho 14', (yellow card) 25'; Matheus Lucas 90+6'	Report	Pedro Castro (yellow card) 45+1'; Marrony (yellow card) 67'; Eduardo Melo 88'; Caio Vinícius (yellow card) 90+3'; Kayky Almeida (yellow card) 90+5'	Stadium: Estádio Raulino de Oliveira; Attendance: 864; Referee: Paulo Roberto Alves Júnior

28 September 2025 29	Remo	4–2	CRB	Belém
18:00 UTC−3	Hernández 27', (yellow card) 31'; Luan Martins (yellow card) 28'; Fábio Alemão 35' (o.g.); Ferreira 55'; João Pedro (yellow card) 69'; Caio Vinícius 74'; Nathan Camargo (yellow card) 90+5'	Report	Matheus Ribeiro 23'; Higor Meritão (yellow card) 46'; Henri (yellow card) 51'; Luiz Fernando (yellow card) 78'; Breno Herculano 90+3'	Stadium: Mangueirão; Attendance: 14,136; Referee: Wagner do Nascimento Magalhães

5 October 2025 30	Operário Ferroviário	0–1	Remo	Ponta Grossa
16:00 UTC−3	Pedro Vilhena (yellow card) 71'	Report	Janderson (yellow card) 72'; Jáderson 89'	Stadium: Estádio Germano Krüger; Attendance: 5,579; Referee: Luiz Augusto Silveira Tisne

9 October 2025 31	Remo	2–1	Athletico Paranaense	Belém
21:35 UTC−3	Marcelinho (yellow card) 21', (goal) 45'; Caio Vinícius 72'; Tassano (yellow card) 90+9'	Report	Mendonza (yellow card) 60'; Dudu 64'; Velasco (yellow card) 90+4'; Aguirre (yellow card) 90+9'; Viveros (yellow card) 90+10'	Stadium: Baenão; Attendance: 9,242; Referee: Afro Rocha de Carvalho Filho

14 October 2025 32	Paysandu	2–3	Remo	Belém
19:30 UTC−3	Edílson (yellow card) 37'; Garcez 51', (yellow card) 78'; Marlon (yellow card) 56'; Wendel 63'; André Lima (yellow card) 84'	Report	Caio Vinícius 16', (yellow card) 75'; Pedro Castro 49'; Hernández 90+3', (yellow card) 90+5'	Stadium: Mangueirão; Attendance: 41,991; Referee: Matheus Delgado Candançan

18 October 2025 33	Remo	3–1	Athletic	Belém
20:30 UTC−3	Pedro Rocha 13', 74'; Hernández 18'	Report	David Braga 67'	Stadium: Baenão; Attendance: 14,058; Referee: Sávio Sampaio

24 October 2025 34	Cuiabá	1–3	Remo	Cuiabá
21:35 UTC−3	Max (yellow card) 1'; Denilson (yellow card) 66'; Carlos Alberto 73'; Nathan Cruz (yellow card) 76'; David Miguel (yellow card) 77'	Report	Tachtsidis 14'; Léo Lang (yellow card) 40'; Ferreira 42'; Marcelinho (yellow card) 45+4'; Nathan (yellow card) 79'; João Pedro 90+4'	Stadium: Arena Pantanal; Attendance: 7,874; Referee: Paulo César Zanovelli da Silva

2 November 2025 35	Remo	1–1	Chapecoense	Belém
18:30 UTC−3	Hernández (yellow card) 27'; Caio Vinícius 30', (yellow card) 80'; Marcelinho (yellow card) 84'	Report	Doma 90+6'	Stadium: Baenão; Attendance: 14,057; Referee: Bruno Arleu de Araújo

8 November 2025 36	Novorizontino	1–1	Remo	Novo Horizonte
16:00 UTC−3	Waguininho 8', (red card) 13'; Lucca (yellow card) 16'; Robson (yellow card) 68'; Jordi (yellow card) 74'; Luís Oyama (yellow card) 88'	Report	Nathan Camargo (yellow card) 10'; Mayk 60' (o.g.); Kayky Almeida (yellow card) 63'	Stadium: Estádio Doutor Jorge Ismael de Biasi; Attendance: 3,722; Referee: Rafael Rodrigo Klein

15 November 2025 37	Avaí	3–1	Remo	Florianópolis
16:30 UTC−3	Cléber 37' (pen.), 50'; Zé Ricardo (yellow card) 45+2'; Léo Reis 81', (yellow card) 82', (red card) 90+6'; Raylan (red card) 90+6'; Gaspar (red card) 90+6'; Emerson Ramon (red card) 90+6'	Report	Pedro Castro (yellow card) 7'; Kawan (yellow card) 49'; João Pedro 71'; Hernández (red card) 90+6'; Ferreira (red card) 90+6'	Stadium: Estádio da Ressacada; Attendance: 6,651; Referee: Felipe Fernandes de Lima

23 November 2025 38	Remo	3–1	Goiás	Belém
16:30 UTC−3	Caio Vinícius (yellow card) 6'; Pedro Rocha 45+3'; João Pedro 62', 84'; Kawan (yellow card) 63'; Kayky Almeida (yellow card) 78'	Report	Freitas (yellow card) 2'; Willean Lepo 7'; Danilo Cunha (yellow card) 76'	Stadium: Mangueirão; Attendance: 47,572; Referee: Raphael Claus

=== Campeonato Paraense ===
Win Draw Loss

==== League phase ====
Pos	Team	Pld	W	D	L	GF	GA	GD	Pts	Qualification or relegation
1	Remo	8	5	2	1	17	4	+13	17	Advance to the Final stage
2	Paysandu	8	5	2	1	15	7	+8	17	Advance to the Final stage
3	Bragantino	8	5	2	1	11	6	+5	17	Advance to the Final stage
4	Castanhal	8	3	4	1	10	7	+3	13	Advance to the Final stage
5	Tuna Luso	8	3	2	3	12	12	0	11	Advance to the Final stage

Source: Globo Esporte

===== Matches =====
18 January 2025 1	Remo	5–0	São Francisco	Belém
18:00 UTC−3	Ytalo 22'; Rafael Castro (yellow card) 32'; Dodô 34', 46'; Maxwell 43'; Felipe Vizeu 90+3'	Report	Hatos (yellow card) 50'; Léo Rosa (yellow card) 68'	Stadium: Mangueirão; Attendance: 26,112; Referee: Olivaldo José Alves Moraes

26 January 2025 2	Caeté	0–4	Remo	Augusto Corrêa
15:30 UTC−3	Diego Borges (yellow card) 37'; Popó (yellow card) 45+2'; Negueba (yellow card) 69'; Roger (yellow card) 85'	Report	Dener (yellow card) 12', (goal) 62'; Pedro Rocha 65'; Adaílton 88' (pen.); Lucão 90+4'	Stadium: Estádio Municipal de Augusto Corrêa; Attendance: 3,000; Referee: Fernando Antônio Mendes de Salles Nascimento Filho

29 January 2025 3	Águia de Marabá	0–1	Remo	Marabá
20:00 UTC−3		Report	Adaílton 90'	Stadium: Estádio Municipal Zinho de Oliveira; Attendance: 1,651; Referee: Marco José Soares de Almeida

3 February 2025 4	Remo	2–2	Capitão Poço	Belém
20:00 UTC−3	Jáderson 6'; Reynaldo (yellow card) 45+5'; Pavani (yellow card) 45+20'; Maxwell 85'	Report	Ju Alagoano 45+25'; Welliton 63', (yellow card) 69'; Alysson (yellow card) 90+4'	Stadium: Mangueirão; Attendance: 12,378; Referee: Djonaltan Costa de Araújo

9 February 2025 5	Tuna Luso	0–3	Remo	Belém
18:00 UTC−3		Report	Maxwell 14'; Felipe Vizeu 67'; Pavani (yellow card) 75'; Adaílton 83'	Stadium: Mangueirão; Attendance: 7,164; Referee: Dewson Fernando Freitas da Silva

16 February 2025 6	Remo	1–0	Santa Rosa	Belém
17:00 UTC−3	Pedro Rocha 67'; Dodô (yellow card) 83'	Report	Diego Macedo (yellow card) 64'	Stadium: Mangueirão; Attendance: 10,577; Referee: Marco José Soares de Almeida

23 February 2025 7	Remo	1–1	Paysandu	Belém
17:00 UTC−3	Pavani (yellow card) 31'; Marcelo Rangel (yellow card) 34'; Adaílton 78' (pen.); Klaus (yellow card) 83'; Marcelinho (yellow card) 86'	Report	Leandro Vilela (yellow card) 27'; Nicolas (yellow card) 34'; Quintana (yellow card) 70'; Matheus Vargas (yellow card) 83'; Juninho (yellow card) 90+3'; Giovanni 90+5'	Stadium: Mangueirão; Attendance: 46,258; Referee: Paulo César Zanovelli da Silva

2 March 2025 8	Cametá	1–0	Remo	Cametá
15:30 UTC−3	Erlon (yellow card) 4'; Fidel 48', (yellow card) 60'; Gustavo (yellow card) 51'; Erverson (yellow card) 84'	Report	Guty (yellow card) 60'	Stadium: Estádio Parque do Bacurau; Attendance: 1,786; Referee: Olivaldo José Alves Moraes

==== Final stage ====
===== Quarter-finals =====
30 March 2025	Remo	2–0	Santa Rosa	Belém
17:00 UTC−3	Pedro Rocha 9'; Reynaldo (yellow card) 41'; Alvariño (yellow card) 42'; Dodô 62'; Felipe Vizeu (yellow card) 82'	Report	Otávio (yellow card) 29'; Yure (yellow card) 30'; Diego Macedo (yellow card) 45'; Warian Santos (yellow card) 58'	Stadium: Mangueirão; Attendance: 11,302; Referee: Fernando Antônio Mendes de Salles Nascimento Filho
Note: The match, originally scheduled for 7 March 2025, was postponed due to the temporary suspension of the championship after complaint of irregular players.

===== Semi-finals =====
2 April 2025	Remo	2–1	Tuna Luso	Belém
20:00 UTC−3	Caio Vinícius 16', (yellow card) 34'; Kadu (yellow card) 29'; Janderson 38'; Rodríguez (yellow card) 43'	Report	Wesley 21', (yellow card) 89'; Kauê (yellow card) 23'; Paranhos (yellow card) 90+6'	Stadium: Mangueirão; Attendance: 14,970; Referee: Olivaldo José Alves Moraes

===== Finals =====
7 May 2025 First leg	Paysandu	2–3	Remo	Belém
21:00 UTC−3	Martínez (yellow card) 7'; Matheus Vargas (yellow card) 22'; Rossi 41' (pen.), (yellow card) 44'; Benítez 42', (yellow card) 90+12'; Leandro Vilela (yellow card) 77'	Report	Janderson 10'; Reynaldo (yellow card) 22'; Klaus 22'; Pavani (yellow card) 24'; Felipe Vizeu (yellow card) 44'; Marcelinho (yellow card) 45+4'; Sávio 60'	Stadium: Mangueirão; Attendance: 38,358; Referee: Anderson Daronco

11 May 2025 Second leg	Remo	0–1 (3–3 agg.) (6–5 p)	Paysandu	Belém
17:00 UTC−3	Marcelinho (yellow card) 52'; Reynaldo (yellow card) 60'	Report	Nicolas (yellow card) 40'; Rossi 59' (pen.), (yellow card) 79'; PK (yellow card) 60'	Stadium: Mangueirão; Attendance: 47,555; Referee: Rodrigo José Pereira de Lima
	Penalties
	Pedro Castro (penalty missed); Dodô (penalty scored); Pedro Rocha (penalty scored); Alvariño (penalty scored); Adaílton (penalty scored); Marcelinho (penalty scored); Reynaldo (penalty scored)		(penalty scored) Bryan; (penalty missed) Benítez; (penalty scored) André Lima; (penalty scored) Leandro Vilela; (penalty scored) Giovanni; (penalty scored) Quintana; (penalty missed) Dudu Vieira

=== Copa do Brasil ===
Win Draw Loss

==== First round ====
26 February 2025	GAS	0–4	Remo	Boa Vista
20:30 UTC−3	Derlan (yellow card) 27'; Raylson (yellow card) 70'	Report	Jáderson 15'; Pavani (yellow card) 23'; Pedro Rocha 55'; Ytalo 58'; Maxwell 83'; Klaus (yellow card) 85'	Stadium: Estádio Canarinho; Attendance: 2,109; Referee: Lucas Canetto Bellote

==== Second round ====
11 March 2025	Remo	1–2	Criciúma	Belém
19:30 UTC−3	Ytalo 45+2'; Adaílton (yellow card) 60'; Klaus (yellow card) 90'; Gabryel Martins (yellow card) 90+1'	Report	Luciano Castán 27'; Everton Morelli (yellow card) 36'; Talisson (yellow card) 47'; Werik Popó 81'	Stadium: Mangueirão; Attendance: 14,487; Referee: Wilton Sampaio

=== Copa Verde ===
Win Draw Loss

==== Round of 16 ====
6 February 2025	Remo	1–1 (3–4 p)	São Raimundo-RR	Belém
20:00 UTC−3	Adaílton 25' (pen.); Jáderson (yellow card) 28' (yellow-red card) 45'; Pavani (yellow card) 85'	Report	Felipe 18'; Guigui (yellow card) 31'; Jeff Silva (yellow card) 43'; Bazilio (red card) 79'; Raí (yellow card) 90+5'	Stadium: Baenão; Attendance: 0 (Behind closed doors); Referee: Rafael Odilio Ramos dos Santos
	Penalties
	Pavani (penalty missed); Felipe Vizeu (penalty missed); Marcelinho (penalty scored); Alvariño (penalty scored); Pedro Castro (penalty scored)		(penalty scored) Luã; (penalty scored) Rian; (penalty missed) Wendell; (penalty scored) Klebinho; (penalty scored) Raí
