= 2025 Campeonato Paraense finals =

- Event: 2025 Campeonato Paraense
Paysandu	Remo
3	3
- on aggregate Remo won 6–5 on penalties

First leg
Paysandu	Remo
2	3
- Date: 7 May 2025
- Venue: Mangueirão, Belém
- Referee: Anderson Daronco
- Attendance: 38,358

Second leg
Remo	Paysandu
0	1
- Date: 11 May 2025
- Venue: Mangueirão, Belém
- Referee: Rodrigo José Pereira de Lima
- Attendance: 47,555

The 2025 Campeonato Paraense finals was the final that decided the 2025 Campeonato Paraense, the 113th season of the Campeonato Paraense. The final were contested between Paysandu and Remo.

Remo won the first leg 3–2, and Paysandu won the second leg 1–0, which meant the title was decided by a penalty shoot-out, which Remo won 6–5 to claim their 48th Campeonato Paraense title.

== Road to the final ==
Note: In all scores below, the score of the finalist is given first.

Paysandu			Round	Remo		
Opponent	Venue	Score		Opponent	Venue	Score
			League phase			
Pos / Team / Pld / Pts; 1 / Remo / 8 / 17; 2 / Paysandu / 8 / 17; 3 / Bragantino / 8 / 17; 4 / Castanhal / 8 / 13; 5 / Tuna Luso / 8 / 11; Source: Globo Esporte			League phase	Pos / Team / Pld / Pts; 1 / Remo / 8 / 17; 2 / Paysandu / 8 / 17; 3 / Bragantino / 8 / 17; 4 / Castanhal / 8 / 13; 5 / Tuna Luso / 8 / 11; Source: Globo Esporte		
Capitão Poço	Home	2–0	Quarter-finals	Santa Rosa	Home	2–0
Águia de Marabá	Home	3–1	Semi-finals	Tuna Luso	Home	2–1

== Format ==
The finals were played on a home-and-away two-legged basis. If tied on aggregate, the penalty shoot-out was used to determine the winner.

== Matches ==
=== First leg ===
7 May 2025
21:00 UTC−3

Paysandu	2–3	Remo
Rossi 41' (pen.); Benítez 42'	Report	Janderson 10'; Klaus 22'; Sávio 60'

Mangueirão, Belém
Attendance: 38,358
Referee: Anderson Daronco (Rio Grande do Sul)

Paysandu	Remo

GK	13	(Brazil) Matheus Nogueira
DF	2	(Brazil) Edílson
DF	4	(Brazil) Luan Freitas
DF	5	(Argentina) Joaquín Novillo		(substituted off) 74'
DF	16	(Brazil) Reverson
MF	27	(Paraguay) Ramón Martínez	(yellow card) 7'	(substituted off) 64'
MF	28	(Brazil) Leandro Vilela	(yellow card) 77'
MF	96	(Brazil) Matheus Vargas	(yellow card) 22'	(substituted off) 81'
FW	24	(Argentina) Benjamín Borasi		(substituted off) 27'
FW	77	(Brazil) Rossi	(yellow card) 44'	(substituted off) 64'
FW	11	(Brazil) Nicolas (c)		(substituted off) 64'
Substitutes:
GK	31	(Brazil) Iago Hass
DF	3	(Uruguay) Yeferson Quintana		(substituted on) 74'
DF	21	(Brazil) Bryan
DF	34	(Brazil) Lucca
MF	6	(Ecuador) Joseph Espinoza
MF	8	(Brazil) André Lima
MF	10	(Brazil) Giovanni		(substituted on) 64'
MF	15	(Brazil) Dudu Vieira		(substituted on) 64'
FW	9	(Paraguay) Jorge Benítez	(yellow card) 90+12'	(substituted on) 27'
FW	20	(Brazil) Marlon		(substituted on) 81'
FW	30	(Brazil) Marcelinho
FW	32	(Chile) Matías Cavalleri		(substituted on) 64'
Coach:
(Brazil) Luizinho Lopes

GK	88	(Brazil) Marcelo Rangel
DF	79	(Brazil) Marcelinho	(yellow card) 45+4'
DF	29	(Brazil) Reynaldo (c)	(yellow card) 22'
DF	4	(Brazil) William Klaus
DF	16	(Brazil) Sávio		(substituted off) 88'
MF	34	(Brazil) Caio Vinícius		(substituted off) 88'
MF	7	(Brazil) Giovanni Pavani	(yellow card) 24'	(substituted off) 64'
MF	10	(Brazil) Jáderson		(substituted off) 75'
FW	32	(Brazil) Pedro Rocha
FW	99	(Brazil) Janderson		(substituted off) 64'
FW	33	(Brazil) Felipe Vizeu	(yellow card) 44'	(substituted off) 88'
Substitutes:
GK	30	(Brazil) Léo Lang
DF	13	(Brazil) Kadu		(substituted on) 64'
DF	14	(Argentina) Iván Alvariño		(substituted on) 88'
DF	20	(Brazil) Thalys		(substituted on) 88'
DF	38	(Brazil) Rafael Castro
MF	6	(Brazil) Daniel Cabral		(substituted on) 75'
MF	11	(Brazil) Pedro Castro		(substituted on) 64'
MF	23	(Brazil) Guty
MF	31	(Brazil) Dodô
FW	15	(Brazil) Adaílton		(substituted on) 88'
FW	17	(Brazil) Gabryel Martins
FW	19	(Brazil) Ytalo
Coach:
(Brazil) Daniel Paulista

Assistant referees:
Danilo Ricardo Simon Manis (São Paulo)
Rafael da Silva Alves (Rio Grande do Sul)
Fourth official:
Fernando Antônio Mendes de Salles Nascimento Filho (Pará)
Fifth official:
Acácio Menezes Leão (Pará)
Video assistant referee:
Wagner Reway (Santa Catarina)
Assistant video assistant referee:
Cleriston Clay Barreto Rios (Sergipe)

=== Second leg ===
11 May 2025
17:00 UTC−3

Remo	0–1	Paysandu
	Report	Rossi 59' (pen.)
Penalties
Pedro Castro (penalty missed); Dodô (penalty scored); Pedro Rocha (penalty scored); Alvariño (penalty scored); Adaílton (penalty scored); Marcelinho (penalty scored); Reynaldo (penalty scored)	6–5	(penalty scored) Bryan; (penalty missed) Benítez; (penalty scored) André Lima; (penalty scored) Leandro Vilela; (penalty scored) Giovanni; (penalty scored) Quintana; (penalty missed) Dudu Vieira

Mangueirão, Belém
Attendance: 37,555
Referee: Rodrigo José Pereira de Lima (Pernambuco)

Remo	Paysandu

GK	88	(Brazil) Marcelo Rangel
DF	79	(Brazil) Marcelinho	(yellow card) 52'
DF	29	(Brazil) Reynaldo (c)	(yellow card) 60'
DF	4	(Brazil) William Klaus		(substituted off) 77'
DF	16	(Brazil) Sávio		(substituted off) 46'
MF	34	(Brazil) Caio Vinícius
MF	7	(Brazil) Giovanni Pavani		(substituted off) 66'
MF	11	(Brazil) Pedro Castro
FW	32	(Brazil) Pedro Rocha
FW	99	(Brazil) Janderson		(substituted off) 32'
FW	33	(Brazil) Felipe Vizeu		(substituted off) 66'
Substitutes:
GK	30	(Brazil) Léo Lang
DF	13	(Brazil) Kadu		(substituted on) 32'
DF	14	(Argentina) Iván Alvariño		(substituted on) 46'
DF	20	(Brazil) Thalys
DF	38	(Brazil) Rafael Castro		(substituted on) 77'
MF	6	(Brazil) Daniel Cabral
MF	23	(Brazil) Guty
MF	31	(Brazil) Dodô		(substituted on) 66'
FW	15	(Brazil) Adaílton		(substituted on) 66'
FW	17	(Brazil) Gabryel Martins
FW	19	(Brazil) Ytalo
Coach:
(Brazil) Daniel Paulista

GK	13	(Brazil) Matheus Nogueira
DF	2	(Brazil) Edílson
DF	3	(Uruguay) Yeferson Quintana
DF	4	(Brazil) Luan Freitas
DF	16	(Brazil) Reverson		(substituted off) 46'
MF	27	(Paraguay) Ramón Martínez		(substituted off) 69'
MF	28	(Brazil) Leandro Vilela
MF	96	(Brazil) Matheus Vargas		(substituted off) 77'
FW	77	(Brazil) Rossi	(yellow card) 79'	(substituted off) 81'
FW	9	(Paraguay) Jorge Benítez
FW	11	(Brazil) Nicolas (c)	(yellow card) 40'	(substituted off) 69'
Substitutes:
GK	31	(Brazil) Iago Hass
DF	21	(Brazil) Bryan		(substituted on) 69'
DF	34	(Brazil) Lucca
DF	94	(Brazil) PK	(yellow card) 60'	(substituted on) 46'
MF	6	(Ecuador) Joseph Espinoza
MF	8	(Brazil) André Lima		(substituted on) 77'
MF	10	(Brazil) Giovanni		(substituted on) 81'
MF	15	(Brazil) Dudu Vieira		(substituted on) 69'
FW	20	(Brazil) Marlon
FW	30	(Brazil) Marcelinho
FW	32	(Chile) Matías Cavalleri
Coach:
(Brazil) Luizinho Lopes

Assistant referees:
Brígida Cirilo Ferreira (Alagoas)
Luanderson Lima dos Santos (Bahia)
Fourth official:
Murilo Augusto Amoras de Almeida (Pará)
Fifth official:
Jhonathan Leone Lopes (Pará)
Video assistant referee:
Gilberto Rodrigues Castro (Pernambuco)
Assistant video assistant referee:
Lilian da Silva Fernandes Bruno (Rio de Janeiro)
