= Marrony =

Brazilian footballer (born 1999)

Personal information
- Full name: Marrony da Silva Liberato
- Date of birth: 5 February 1999 (age 27)
- Place of birth: Volta Redonda, Brazil
- Height: 1.84 m (6 ft 0 in)
- Position: Forward

Team information
- Current team: Atlético Goianiense (on loan from Remo)

Youth career
- 2015–2018: Vasco da Gama

Senior career*
| Years | Team | Apps | (Gls) |
| 2018–2020 | Vasco da Gama | 82 | (11) |
| 2020–2021 | Atlético Mineiro | 63 | (10) |
| 2021–2025 | Midtjylland | 10 | (0) |
| 2022 | → Fluminense (loan) | 18 | (1) |
| 2025– | Remo | 17 | (2) |
| 2026– | → Atlético Goianiense (loan) | 4 | (1) |
- * Club domestic league appearances and goals as of 16 April 2026

Marrony da Silva Liberato (born 5 February 1999), known simply as Marrony, is a Brazilian professional footballer who plays as a forward for Atlético Goianiense on loan from Clube do Remo.

== Club career ==
=== Vasco da Gama ===
Born in Volta Redonda, Rio de Janeiro, Marrony joined Vasco da Gama's youth setup in 2015. He made his first team debut on 24 January 2018, coming on as a second-half substitute for Rildo in a 2–1 Campeonato Carioca away loss against Cabofriense.

Marrony made his Série A debut on 7 September 2018, replacing Yago Pikachu in a 2–1 loss at América Mineiro. He scored his first goal in the category on seventeen days later, netting the winner in a 2–1 home success over Bahia. On scoring his first professional goal, Marrony said: “I never imagined that a guy like me, a kid from the youth team, coming from Volta Redonda — I scored a goal against Bahia and the victory in addition to this was beautiful.”

On 18 February 2019, after establishing himself as a starter, Marrony renewed his contract until 2023.

=== Atlético Mineiro ===
On 15 June 2020, Atlético Mineiro announced the signing of Marrony on a five-year contract, for a reported fee of €3.5 million.

=== Midtjylland ===
On 11 August 2021, Atlético announced the transfer of Marrony to Danish club Midtjylland for €4.5 million. He made his debut on 22 September in a 5–0 win over Kjellerup IF in the Danish Cup. His domestic league debut followed four days later in the 1–0 home win over Randers FC, coming on for compatriot Júnior Brumado in the 81st minute. Another four days followed before he made his first European appearance, replacing Gustav Isaksen in the 71st minute as Midtjylland lost 3–1 to Braga in the UEFA Europa League group stage.

=== Remo ===
In June 2025 it was confirmed, that Marrony had been sold to Clube do Remo from Danish club FC Midtjylland.

== Career statistics ==
As of 10 December 2021

Appearances and goals by club, season and competition
| Club | Season | League | | | State League | | Cup | | Continental | | Other | | Total | |
| Club | Season | Division | Apps | Goals | Apps | Goals | Apps | Goals | Apps | Goals | Apps | Goals | Apps | Goals |
|---|---|---|---|---|---|---|---|---|---|---|---|---|---|---|
| Vasco da Gama | 2018 | Série A | 12 | 1 | 1 | 0 | 0 | 0 | — | | — | | 13 | 1 |
| Vasco da Gama | 2019 | Série A | 34 | 4 | 16 | 5 | 6 | 0 | — | | — | | 56 | 9 |
| Vasco da Gama | 2020 | Série A | 0 | 0 | 8 | 0 | 3 | 0 | 2 (Note: Appearance(s) in Copa Sudamericana) | 0 | — | | 13 | 0 |
| Vasco da Gama | Total | | 46 | 5 | 25 | 5 | 9 | 0 | 2 | 0 | — | | 82 | 10 |
| Atlético Mineiro | 2020 | Série A | 32 | 5 | 6 | 1 | — | | — | | — | | 38 | 6 |
| Atlético Mineiro | 2021 | Série A | 7 | 0 | 12 | 3 | 2 | 0 | 4 (Note: Appearance(s) in Copa Libertadores) | 1 | — | | 25 | 4 |
| Atlético Mineiro | Total | | 39 | 5 | 18 | 4 | 2 | 0 | 4 | 1 | — | | 63 | 10 |
| Midtjylland | 2021–22 | Superliga | 5 | 0 | — | | 1 | 0 | 2 (Note: Appearance(s) in UEFA Europa League) | 0 | — | | 8 | 0 |
| Career total | | | 90 | 10 | 43 | 9 | 12 | 0 | 8 | 1 | 0 | 0 | 153 | 20 |

== Honours ==
Vasco da Gama

- Taça Guanabara: 2019

Atlético Mineiro

- Campeonato Brasileiro Série A: 2021
- Campeonato Mineiro: 2020, 2021

Fluminense

- Taça Guanabara: 2023
- Campeonato Carioca: 2023

Remo

- Super Copa Grão-Pará: 2026

== Personal life ==
Marrony's cousin Ricardo Santos is also a footballer and a forward.
