= Eduardo Melo =

Brazilian footballer

Personal information
- Full name: Eduardo de Queiroz Melo
- Date of birth: 13 May 2001 (age 25)
- Place of birth: Salvador, Brazil
- Height: 1.85 m (6 ft 1 in)
- Position: Forward

Team information
- Current team: Remo
- Number: 39

Youth career
- Criciúma

Senior career*
Years	Team	Apps	(Gls)
2020–2025	Criciúma	41	(3)
2023	→ Concórdia (loan)	10	(0)
2023	→ Giravanz Kitakyushu (loan)	5	(0)
2025	→ Caxias (loan)	12	(3)
2025–	Remo	9	(3)
- * Club domestic league appearances and goals as of 9 April 2026

Eduardo de Queiroz Melo (born 13 May 2001), known as Eduardo Melo, is a Brazilian footballer who plays as a forward for Remo.

== Career ==
Born in Salvador, Bahia, Eduardo Melo was a Criciúma youth graduate. He made his first team debut in 2020, but was unable to establish himself as a regular starter in the following years, and was loaned out to Concórdia on 30 November 2022.

On 8 August 2023, Eduardo Melo renewed his contract with Tigre until 2025, and was loaned to Japanese side Giravanz Kitakyushu until the end of the year. Back to his parent club for the 2024 season, he made his Série A debut on 8 December of that year, playing the last 17 minutes of a 5–1 away loss to Red Bull Bragantino, as his club was already relegated.

On 11 April 2025, Eduardo Melo was announced on loan at Caxias. On 22 August, he was presented at Remo on a permanent deal.

== Career statistics ==
As of 29 January 2026

Club	Season	League			State League		Cup		Continental		Other		Total	
Club	Season	Division	Apps	Goals	Apps	Goals	Apps	Goals	Apps	Goals	Apps	Goals	Apps	Goals
Criciúma	2020	Série C	3	1	4	0	1	0	—		—		8	1
Criciúma	2021	Série C	2	0	5	0	—		—		5 (Note: Appearance(s) in Copa Santa Catarina)	2	12	2
Criciúma	2022	Série B	5	0	8	1	1	0	—		—		14	1
Criciúma	2024	Série A	1	0	7	0	0	0	—		—		8	0
Criciúma	2025	Série B	—		6	1	0	0	—		—		6	1
Criciúma	Total		11	1	30	2	2	0	—		5	2	48	5
Concórdia (loan)	2023	Série D	—		10	0	—		—		—		10	0
Giravanz Kitakyushu (loan)	2023	J3 League	5	0	—		—		—		—		5	0
Caxias (loan)	2025	Série C	12	3	—		—		—		—		12	3
Remo	2025	Série B	6	1	—		—		—		—		6	1
Remo	2026	Série A	1	0	1	1	0	0	—		1 (Note: Appearance(s) in Super Copa Grão-Pará)	1	3	2
Remo	Total		7	1	1	1	0	0	—		1	1	9	3
Career total			35	5	41	3	2	0	0	0	6	3	84	11

== Honours ==
Remo

- Super Copa Grão-Pará: 2026
