= Jáderson =

Brazilian footballer

Personal information
- Full name: Jáderson Flores dos Reis
- Date of birth: 12 August 2000 (age 26)
- Place of birth: Porto Alegre, Brazil
- Height: 1.71 m (5 ft 7 in)
- Positions: Winger; left-back

Team information
- Current team: Remo
- Number: 10

Youth career
- 2014–2017: Cruzeiro-RS
- 2017–2020: Athletico Paranaense

Senior career*
Years	Team	Apps	(Gls)
2017	Cruzeiro-RS	2	(0)
2017–2024	Athletico Paranaense	37	(1)
2020–2021	→ Santa Cruz (loan)	20	(1)
2022	→ Sport Recife (loan)	17	(3)
2023	→ Tombense (loan)	33	(0)
2024	→ Remo (loan)	26	(6)
2025–	Remo	36	(2)
- * Club domestic league appearances and goals as of 9 April 2026

Jáderson Flores dos Reis (born 12 August 2000), simply known as Jáderson, is a Brazilian footballer who plays as either a left-winger or a left-back for Remo.

== Career statistics ==
As of 13 October 2021.

Club	Season	League			State league		Cup		Continental		Other		Total	
Club	Season	Division	Apps	Goals	Apps	Goals	Apps	Goals	Apps	Goals	Apps	Goals	Apps	Goals
Cruzeiro-RS	2017	Gaúcho	—		2	0	—		—		—		2	0
Athletico Paranaense	2019	Série A	1	0	9	0	0	0	0	0	—		10	0
Athletico Paranaense	2020	Série A	0	0	8	0	0	0	—		—		8	0
Athletico Paranaense	2021	Série A	4	0	11	1	0	0	2 (Note: Appearance(s) in Copa Sudamericana)	0	—		17	1
Athletico Paranaense	Total		5	0	28	1	0	0	2	0	—		35	1
Santa Cruz (loan)	2020	Série C	20	1	0	0	—		—		—		20	1
Career total			25	1	30	1	0	0	2	0	0	0	57	2

== Honours ==
Athletico Paranaense

- Copa Sudamericana: 2021

Remo

- Campeonato Paraense: 2025
- Super Copa Grão-Pará: 2026
