= Carlos Eduardo da Silva Santos =

Carlos Eduardo da Silva Santos may refer to:

- Carlão (footballer, born 2001), commonly known as Carlão, Brazilian football defender
- Kadu (footballer, born 2005), commonly known as Kadu, Brazilian football defender
