= Giovanni Pavani =

Brazilian footballer

Personal information
- Full name: Giovanni Fernando Confreste Pavani
- Date of birth: November 22, 1996 (age 29)
- Place of birth: Catanduva, Brazil
- Height: 1.78 m (5 ft 10 in)
- Position: Midfielder

Team information
- Current team: Ceará
- Number: 7

Youth career
- Rio Preto

Senior career*
Years	Team	Apps	(Gls)
2016	Rio Preto	24	(2)
2016	Olímpia	7	(3)
2017–2023	Linense	38	(5)
2018	→ Noroeste (loan)	9	(0)
2019	→ Patrocinense (loan)	11	(1)
2019	→ Uberaba (loan)	4	(0)
2019	→ EC São Bernardo (loan)	23	(1)
2020	→ Taubaté (loan)	15	(1)
2020–2021	→ Água Santa (loan)	30	(2)
2021	→ São Bernardo (loan)	8	(0)
2022	→ Operário Ferroviário (loan)	40	(4)
2023	→ Chapecoense (loan)	44	(2)
2024–2026	Remo	86	(7)
2026–	Ceará	8	(0)
- * Club domestic league appearances and goals as of 18 November 2026

Giovanni Fernando Confreste Pavani (born November 22, 1996) commonly known as Giovanni Pavani or simply Pavani, is a Brazilian professional footballer who plays as a midfielder for Ceará.

== Club career ==
=== Operário Ferroviário ===
On loan from Linense, Pavani has signed for Operário for the Série B. He played in 40 games and scored four goals.

=== Chapecoense ===
In 2023, he was loaned to Chapecoense. He played 44 games and scored 2 goals, helping the team escape relegation to the third division.

== Honours ==
São Bernardo

- Copa Paulista: 2021

Remo

- Campeonato Paraense: 2025; runner-up: 2024, 2026
- Super Copa Grão-Pará: 2026
