= Yago Ferreira =

Brazilian footballer (born 2001)

Personal information
- Full name: Yago de Paula Ferreira
- Date of birth: 2 August 2001 (age 25)
- Place of birth: Rio de Janeiro, Brazil
- Height: 1.74 m (5 ft 9 in)
- Position: Midfielder

Team information
- Current team: Fluminense

Youth career
- 2016–2022: Fluminense

Senior career*
Years	Team	Apps	(Gls)
2023–	Fluminense	0	(0)
2023	→ Náutico (loan)	0	(0)
2024	→ Nova Iguaçu (loan)	12	(1)
2024	→ Coritiba (loan)	5	(0)
2025	→ Brasiliense (loan)	8	(1)
2025–2026	→ Remo (loan)	0	(0)
2026–2026	→ Majd (loan)		
- * Club domestic league appearances and goals as of 12:48, 16 December 2025 (UTC)

Yago de Paula Ferreira (born 2 August 2001), known as Yago Ferreira or just Yago, is a Brazilian footballer who plays as a midfielder Fluminense.

== Career ==
=== Fluminense ===
Born in Rio de Janeiro, Yago joined Fluminense's youth sides in 2016, from a local FC Barcelona school in his hometown. He progressed through the youth categories, before being an unused substitute with the main squad in a 0–0 Campeonato Carioca away draw against Boavista on 12 March 2022.

==== Loan to Náutico ====
On 18 July 2023, after failing to make a first team breakthrough, Yago moved on loan to Série C side Náutico. He returned to Flu on 19 September, however, after failing to make an appearance for Timbu.

==== Loan to Nova Iguaçu ====
On 18 September 2023, Nova Iguaçu announced the signing of Yago on loan for the 2024 season. He made his senior debut on 21 January 2024, starting in a 1–1 home draw against Flamengo.

Yago scored his first senior goal on 24 January 2024, netting his team's third in a 3–2 away win over Bangu. He was a regular starter for the club during the 2024 Campeonato Carioca, as they reached the finals for the first time ever.

== Personal life ==
Yago is the son of former footballer Iranildo.

== Career statistics ==
As of 16 December 2025.

Appearances and goals by club, season and competition
Club	Season	League			State League		Cup		Continental		Other		Total	
Club	Season	Division	Apps	Goals	Apps	Goals	Apps	Goals	Apps	Goals	Apps	Goals	Apps	Goals
Fluminense	2022	Série A	0	0	0	0	0	0	0	0	—		0	0
Náutico (loan)	2023	Série C	0	0	—		—		—		—		0	0
Nova Iguaçu (loan)	2024	Série D	0	0	12	1	2	2	—		—		14	3
Coritiba (loan)	2024	Série B	1	0	—		—		—		—		1	0
Brasiliense (loan)	2025	Brasiliense	—		8	1	—		—		3 (Note: Appearance(s) in Copa Verde)	0	11	1
Remo (loan)	2025	Série B	0	0	—		—		—		—		0	0
Career total			1	0	20	2	2	2	0	0	3	0	26	4
