= Marcelinho (footballer, born July 1998) =

Brazilian footballer

Personal information
- Full name: Marcelo Rodrigues Souza
- Date of birth: July 20, 1998 (age 28)
- Place of birth: Aracaju, Brazil
- Height: 1.74 m (5 ft 9 in)
- Position: Right back

Team information
- Current team: Remo
- Number: 79

Youth career
- 2016–2017: Sergipe
- 2017: → Grêmio (loan)
- 2018: Fluminense

Senior career*
| Years | Team | Apps | (Gls) |
| 2019–2022 | Confiança | 100 | (7) |
| 2022 | → Brasil de Pelotas (loan) | 28 | (1) |
| 2023 | Vila Nova | 30 | (0) |
| 2024 | Chapecoense | 36 | (3) |
| 2025– | Remo | 60 | (4) |
- * Club domestic league appearances and goals as of 31 May 2026

Marcelo Rodrigues Souza (born July 20, 1998) commonly known as Marcelinho, is a Brazilian professional footballer who plays as a right back for Remo.

== Career ==
Marcelinho began his career in 2019 with Confiança, where he stayed until 2022. He played 100 games and scored 7 goals, winning the Campeonato Sergipano in 2020.

In 2022, he was loaned to Brasil de Pelotas. He played 28 games and scored one goal. The following year, in 2023, he was transferred to Vila Nova, where he played 30 games. In 2024, he signed with Chapecoense. He played 36 games and scored 3 goals, being one of the team's main players.

== Honours ==
Confiança

- Campeonato Sergipano: 2020

Remo

- Campeonato Paraense: 2025; runner-up: 2026
- Super Copa Grão-Pará: 2026
