= William Klaus =

Brazilian footballer (born 1994)

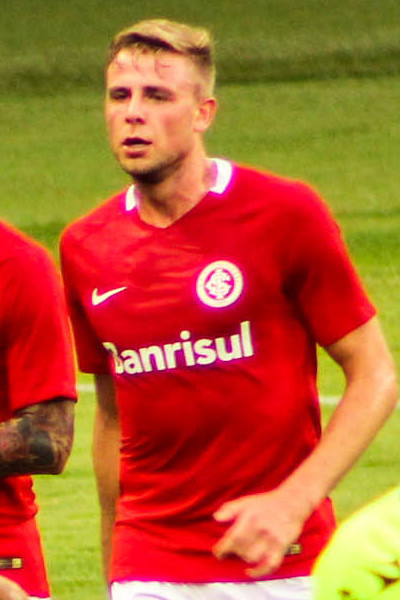

Personal information
- Full name: William Klaus
- Date of birth: 11 January 1994 (age 32)
- Place of birth: Dois Irmãos, Brazil
- Height: 1.87 m (6 ft 1 1/2 in)
- Position: Centre-back

Team information
- Current team: Operário Ferroviário
- Number: 4

Youth career
- Grêmio
- Internacional
- Juventude

Senior career*
Years	Team	Apps	(Gls)
2013–2017	Juventude	32	(1)
2017	→ Internacional (loan)	19	(4)
2018–2019	Internacional	27	(1)
2020–2021	Ceará	39	(5)
2022	Botafogo	3	(0)
2022	→ Atlético Goianiense (loan)	13	(0)
2023–2024	RWDM	16	(0)
2024–2025	Iraklis	6	(0)
2025	Remo	31	(1)
2026–	Operário Ferroviário	13	(0)
- * Club domestic league appearances and goals as of 18 November 2026

William Klaus (born 11 January 1994), commonly known as Klaus, is a Brazilian professional footballer who plays as a centre–back for Operário Ferroviário.

== Club career ==
Born in Dois Irmãos, Rio Grande do Sul, Klaus represented Grêmio, Internacional and Juventude as a youth. He made his senior debut with the latter on 12 March 2015, starting in a 0–1 Campeonato Gaúcho away loss against União Frederiquense.

Klaus became a regular starter during the 2016 campaign, as his side achieved promotion from the Série C and reached the quarterfinals of the Copa do Brasil. His first senior goal came on 21 April of that year, the second in a 2–0 home win against former club Grêmio.

On 19 January 2017, Klaus joined Internacional, recently relegated to Série B.

On 27 September 2024, Klaus joined Iraklis.

== Career statistics ==
As of 25 October 2021

Club	Season	League			State League		Cup		Continental		Other		Total	
Club	Season	Division	Apps	Goals	Apps	Goals	Apps	Goals	Apps	Goals	Apps	Goals	Apps	Goals
Juventude	2015	Série C	0	0	1	0	—		—		5 (Note: One appearance in Copa FGF, four appearances in Supercopa Gaúcha)	0	6	0
Juventude	2016	Série C	10	0	13	1	8	0	—		—		31	1
Juventude	Total		10	0	14	1	8	0	—		5	0	37	1
Internacional	2017	Série B	14	4	2	0	1	0	—		2 (Note: Appearance(s) in Primeira Liga)	0	19	4
Internacional	2018	Série A	6	0	5	0	4	0	—		—		15	0
Internacional	2019	Série A	10	0	2	0	0	0	0	0	—		12	0
Internacional	Total		30	4	9	0	5	0	0	0	2	0	46	4
Ceará	2020	Série A	12	0	3	1	2	0	—		8 (Note: Appearance(s) in Copa do Nordeste)	3	25	4
Ceará	2021	Série A	2	0	2	1	2	0	1 (Note: Appearance(s) in Copa Sudamericana)	0	4	0	11	1
Ceará	Total		14	0	5	2	4	0	1	0	12	3	36	5
Career total			54	4	28	3	17	0	1	0	19	3	119	10

== Honours ==
Ceará

- Copa do Nordeste: 2020

Remo

- Campeonato Paraense: 2025
- Super Copa Grão-Pará: 2026
