= Daniel Cabral =

Brazilian footballer (born 2002)

Personal information
- Full name: Daniel Cabral de Oliveira
- Date of birth: 14 May 2002 (age 24)
- Place of birth: Mesquita, Brazil
- Height: 1.74 m (5 ft 9 in)
- Position: Midfielder

Team information
- Current team: Paide
- Number: 6

Youth career
- 2007: Tênis Clube Mesquita (Futsal)
- 2008: Cascadura (Futsal)
- 2009–2019: Flamengo

Senior career*
Years	Team	Apps	(Gls)
2020–2024	Flamengo	1	(0)
2024–2026	Estrela da Amadora	1	(0)
2025	→ Remo (loan)	4	(0)
2025	→ Volta Redonda (loan)	6	(0)
2026–	Paide	30	(6)

International career^{‡}
2018	Brazil U16	2	(0)
2019	Brazil U17	11	(0)
2020	Brazil U20	1	(0)
- * Club domestic league appearances and goals as of 17 November 2026 ‡ National team caps and goals as of 16 August 2024

Daniel Cabral de Oliveira (born 14 May 2002) is a Brazilian footballer who plays as a midfielder for Estonian Meistriliiga club Paide.

== Career statistics ==
=== Club ===
As of 24 July 2026.

Club	Season	League			State league		Cup		Continental		Other		Total	
Club	Season	Division	Apps	Goals	Apps	Goals	Apps	Goals	Apps	Goals	Apps	Goals	Apps	Goals
Flamengo	2020	Série A	0	0	0	0	1 (Note: Appearances in the Copa do Brasil)	0	—		—		1	0
Flamengo	2021	Série A	0	0	2 (Note: Appearances in the Campeonato Carioca)	0	1	0	—		—		3	0
Flamengo	2022	Série A	1	0	0	0	1	0	—		—		2	0
Flamengo	2023	Série A	—		—		—		—		—		0	0
Flamengo	2024	Série A	—		—		—		—		—		0	0
Flamengo	Total		1	0	2	0	3	0	0	0	0	0	6	0
Estrela da Amadora	2024–25	Primeira Liga	1	0	—		0	0	—		—		1	0
Remo (loan)	2025	Série B	4	0	1	0	0	0	—		—		5	0
Volta Redonda (loan)	2025	Série B	6	0	0	0	0	0	—		—		6	0
Paide Linnameeskond	2026	Meistriliiga	17	5	—		2	0	3 (Note: Appearances in UEFA Conference League)	0	—		22	5
Career total			29	5	3	0	5	0	3	0	0	0	40	5

== Honours ==
=== Club ===
Flamengo

- Campeonato Carioca: 2021
- Copa do Brasil: 2022

Remo

- Campeonato Paraense: 2025

=== International ===
Brazil U17

- FIFA U-17 World Cup: 2019
