= Sávio (footballer, born 1995) =

Brazilian footballer

Personal information
- Full name: Sávio Antônio Alves
- Date of birth: 26 May 1995 (age 31)
- Place of birth: Palma, Brazil
- Height: 1.73 m (5 ft 8 in)
- Position: Left back

Team information
- Current team: Ceará
- Number: 6

Youth career
- 2015: Ferroviária

Senior career*
Years	Team	Apps	(Gls)
2016–2021	Ferroviária	3	(0)
2016	→ União Barbarense (loan)	17	(2)
2017	→ Campinense (loan)	7	(0)
2018	→ Ferroviário-CE (loan)	27	(0)
2018	→ Londrina (loan)	18	(0)
2019–2021	→ América Mineiro (loan)	46	(0)
2021–2024	Rio Ave	42	(0)
2022	→ Goiás (loan)	11	(0)
2024	→ Remo (loan)	8	(0)
2025–2026	Remo	39	(2)
2026–	Ceará	11	(0)
- * Club domestic league appearances and goals as of 18 November 2026

Sávio Antônio Alves (born 26 May 1995), known simply as Sávio, is a Brazilian footballer who plays as a left back for Brazilian club Ceará.

== Club career ==
Sávio began his professional career with Ferroviária in 2016. He then had a series of loan spells at various clubs, most notably at Ferroviário-CE in 2018, winning the 2018 Série D title, and at América Mineiro between 2019 and 2021, finishing as runner-ups in the 2020 Série B and clinching promotion to the top national division. On 1 February 2021, he moved to Portuguese club Rio Ave.

== Honours ==
Ferroviário-CE

- Campeonato Brasileiro Série D: 2018

Remo

- Campeonato Paraense: 2025; runner-up: 2026
- Super Copa Grão-Pará: 2026
