= 2025 Cuiabá Esporte Clube season =

Cuiabá Esporte Clube
2025 season
- Stadium: Arena Pantanal
- Série B: 10th
- Campeonato Mato-Grossense: Pre-season
- Copa do Brasil: Pre-season
- Top goalscorer: League: Alisson Safira (10); All: Alisson Safira (10)
- Average home league attendance: 3,071
- All statistics correct as of 12 January 2025.

The 2025 season is the 22nd year of Cuiabá Esporte Clube's history. The team will take part in the Campeonato Brasileiro Série B after relegation, the Campeonato Mato-Grossense, and the Copa do Brasil.

== Squad ==
=== Transfers Out ===
Pos.	Player	Transferred from	Fee	Date	Source
FW	(Paraguay) Isidro Pitta	(Brazil) Red Bull Bragantino	Undisclosed	3 January 2025	
DF	(Brazil) Alan Empereur	(Brazil) Mirassol	Undisclosed	14 January 2025	
DF	(Brazil) Matheus Alexandre	(Brazil) Sport Recife	$1,500,000	15 January 2025	

== Competitions ==
=== Overall record ===
Competition	First match	Last match	Starting round	Final position	Record							
Competition	First match	Last match	Starting round	Final position	Pld	W	D	L	GF	GA	GD	Win %
Série B	5 April 2025	23 November 2025	Matchday 1	10th	38	14	12	12	43	44	−1	36.84
Campeonato Mato-Grossense	12 January 2025				2	0	2	0	1	1	+0	0.00
Copa do Brasil					0	0	0	0	0	0	+0	—
Total					40	14	14	12	44	45	−1	35.00

Source: Competitions

=== Série B ===
==== League table ====
Pos	Team	Pld	W	D	L	GF	GA	GD	Pts
8	CRB	38	16	8	14	45	40	+5	56
9	Avaí	38	14	14	10	50	40	+10	56
10	Cuiabá	38	14	12	12	43	44	−1	54
11	Atlético Goianiense	38	13	13	12	39	38	+1	52
12	Operário Ferroviário	38	12	12	14	40	44	−4	48

Source: CBF
Rules for classification: 1) points; 2) wins; 3) goal difference; 4) goals scored; 5) head-to-head results (only between 2 teams); 6) fewest red cards; 7) fewest yellow cards; 8) drawing of lots.

==== Matches ====
6 April 2025 1	Volta Redonda	0–1	Cuiabá

10 April 2025 2	Cuiabá	2–2	Avaí

15 April 2025 3	Cuiabá	2–1	Athletico Paranaense

22 April 2025 4	Atlético Goianiense	1–1	Cuiabá

27 April 2025 5	Cuiabá	1–0	Ferroviária

6 May 2025 6	CRB	1–1	Cuiabá

11 May 2025 7	Cuiabá	2–3	Operário Ferroviário

16 May 2025 8	Chapecoense	2–1	Cuiabá

26 May 2025 9	Cuiabá	1–0	Vila Nova

31 May 2025 10	Athletic	0–2	Cuiabá

6 June 2025 11	Cuiabá	1–0	Paysandu

15 June 2025 12	Novorizontino	3–0	Cuiabá

22 June 2025 13	Coritiba	2–0	Cuiabá

30 June 2025 14	Cuiabá	0–1	Botafogo-SP

5 July 2025 15	Remo	0–0	Cuiabá

15 July 2025 16	Cuiabá	3–1	Amazonas

19 July 2025 17	Goiás	3–1	Cuiabá

23 July 2025 18	Cuiabá	3–1	América Mineiro

29 July 2025 19	Criciúma	1–0	Cuiabá

4 August 2025 20	Cuiabá	2–0	Volta Redonda

10 August 2025 21	Avaí	2–0	Cuiabá

16 August 2025 22	Athletico Paranaense	1–1	Cuiabá

24 August 2025 23	Cuiabá	2–2	Atlético Goianiense

1 September 2025 24	Ferroviária	2–2	Cuiabá

8 September 2025 25	Cuiabá	1–0	CRB

14 September 2025 26	Operário Ferroviário	1–1	Cuiabá

21 September 2025 27	Cuiabá	1–0	Chapecoense

24 September 2025 28	Vila Nova	2–2	Cuiabá

28 September 2025 29	Cuiabá	2–1	Athletic

2 October 2025 30	Paysandu	1–1	Cuiabá

8 October 2025 31	Cuiabá	0–1	Novorizontino

12 October 2025 32	Cuiabá	1–0	Coritiba

19 October 2025 33	Botafogo-SP	2–2	Cuiabá

24 October 2025 34	Cuiabá	1–3	Remo

2 November 2025 35	Amazonas	2–0	Cuiabá

7 November 2025 36	Cuiabá	0–1	Goiás

16 November 2025 37	América Mineiro	1–1	Cuiabá

23 November 2025 38	Cuiabá	1–0	Criciúma

=== Campeonato Mato-Grossense ===
==== Results by round ====
Round	1	2
Ground	A	H
Result	D	D
Position	6	

Updated to match(es) played on 18 January 2025. Source:
A = Away; H = Home; W = Win; D = Draw; L = Loss

12 January 2025 1	Operário FC	0–0	Cuiabá	Várzea Grande
18:00 UTC−4				Stadium: Estádio Dito Souza

18 January 2025 2	Cuiabá	1–1	Mixto	Cuiabá
15:30 UTC−4	66'		30'	Stadium: Arena Pantanal
