= Nathan Santos =

Brazilian footballer

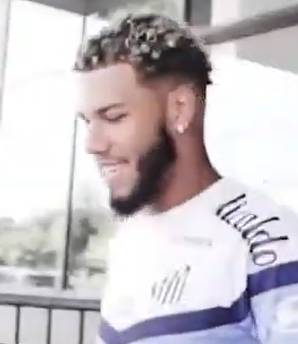
- Nathan in 2023

Personal information
- Full name: Nathan Santos de Araújo
- Date of birth: 5 September 2001 (age 25)
- Place of birth: Rio de Janeiro, Brazil
- Height: 1.83 m (6 ft 0 in)
- Position: Right-back

Team information
- Current team: Juventude (on loan from Santos)
- Number: 22

Youth career
- 2017: Portuguesa-RJ
- 2017–2020: Vasco da Gama

Senior career*
Years	Team	Apps	(Gls)
2020–2021	Vasco da Gama	0	(0)
2020–2021	→ Boavista (loan)	14	(0)
2021–2022	Boavista	30	(0)
2022–	Santos	25	(0)
2023–2024	→ Famalicão (loan)	28	(0)
2024–2025	→ Internacional (loan)	3	(0)
2025	→ Remo (loan)	11	(0)
2026–	→ Juventude (loan)	17	(0)
- * Club domestic league appearances and goals as of 17 November 2026

Nathan Santos de Araújo (born 5 September 2001), known as Nathan Santos or just Nathan, is a Brazilian professional footballer who plays as a right-back for Juventude, on loan from Santos.

== Career ==
=== Early career ===
Born in Rio de Janeiro, Nathan joined Vasco da Gama's youth setup in May 2017, from Portuguesa-RJ; the transfer was controversial, as Vasco only registered his contract in June 2018, and later denied Portuguesa's claim over a 30% sell-on clause. In January 2019, Spanish club Valencia made an offer for him, but the move never materialized.

Nathan featured as an unused substitute for the main squad of Vasco in two matches of the 2020 Campeonato Carioca.

=== Boavista ===
On 13 September 2020, Nathan moved abroad for the first time in his career, after agreeing to a one-year loan deal with Primeira Liga side Boavista, with an obligation to buy. He made his professional debut thirteen days later, replacing Jesús Alejandro Gómez late into a 5–0 home loss to FC Porto.

After making 15 appearances overall in his first season, Nathan signed a permanent deal until June 2025 on 30 June 2021. He established himself as a regular during the 2021–22 campaign, and scored his first professional goal on 16 December 2021, netting his team's fourth in a 5–1 home routing of Braga, in the Taça da Liga.

=== Santos ===
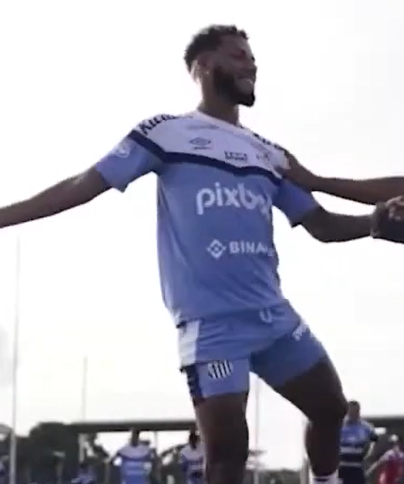
Nathan training with Santos in 2023

On 5 August 2022, Nathan returned to his home country after signing a contract with Série A side Santos until December 2026. He made his debut for the club exactly one month later, replacing Madson in a 2–1 home loss against Goiás.

On 27 June 2023, Nathan was fined 50% of his wages and separated from the first team squad due to disciplinary reasons, being also transfer-listed by the club.

==== Loan to Famalicão ====
On 7 August 2023, Nathan returned to Portugal after agreeing to a one-year loan deal with Famalicão.

==== Loan to Internacional ====
On 27 August 2024, Nathan was announced at Internacional on loan until June 2025. A backup to Braian Aguirre, also a new signing, he only featured in four matches before leaving.

==== Loan to Remo ====
On 14 July 2025, Nathan moved to Série B side Remo on loan until the end of the season.

==== Loan to Juventude ====
On 30 January 2026, Nathan agreed to a loan deal with Juventude also in the second division.

== Career statistics ==
As of 19 May 2026

Club	Season	League			State League		Cup		Continental		Other		Total	
Club	Season	Division	Apps	Goals	Apps	Goals	Apps	Goals	Apps	Goals	Apps	Goals	Apps	Goals
Boavista	2020–21	Primeira Liga	14	0	—		1	0	—		0	0	15	0
Boavista	2021–22	Primeira Liga	30	0	—		1	0	—		3 (Note: Appearance(s) in Taça da Liga)	1	34	1
Boavista	Total		44	0	—		2	0	—		3	1	49	1
Santos	2022	Série A	9	0	—		—		—		—		9	0
Santos	2023	Série A	7	0	9	0	4	0	4 (Note: Appearance(s) in Copa Sudamericana)	0	—		24	0
Santos	Total		16	0	9	0	4	0	4	0	—		33	0
Famalicão (loan)	2023–24	Primeira Liga	28	0	—		1	0	—		0	0	29	0
Internacional (loan)	2024	Série A	1	0	—		—		—		—		1	0
Internacional (loan)	2025	Série A	1	0	1	0	0	0	1 (Note: Appearance(s) in Copa Libertadores)	0	—		3	0
Internacional (loan)	Total		2	0	1	0	0	0	1	0	—		4	0
Remo (loan)	2025	Série B	11	0	—		—		—		—		11	0
Juventude (loan)	2026	Série B	7	0	2	0	2	0	—		3 (Note: Appearance(s) in Copa Sul-Sudeste)	0	14	0
Career total			108	0	12	0	9	0	5	0	6	1	140	1

== Honours ==
Internacional

- Campeonato Gaúcho: 2025
