= Alan Rodríguez (Paraguayan footballer) =

Paraguayan footballer

Personal information
- Full name: Alan Francisco Rodríguez Armoa
- Date of birth: August 15, 2000 (age 26)
- Place of birth: Fernando de la Mora, Paraguay
- Height: 1.72 m (5 ft 8 in)
- Positions: Left-back; midfielder

Team information
- Current team: Olimpia

Youth career
- Cerro Porteño

Senior career*
Years	Team	Apps	(Gls)
2018–2022	Cerro Porteño	136	(10)
2023–2025	Rosario Central	70	(2)
2025	Remo	18	(0)
2026–	Olimpia	0	(0)

International career^{‡}
2017	Paraguay U17	11	(4)
2019	Paraguay U20	4	(0)
- * Club domestic league appearances and goals as of 15 December 2025 ‡ National team caps and goals as of 26 January 2019

Alan Francisco Rodríguez Armoa (born 15 August 2000) is a Paraguayan professional footballer who plays as a left-back or midfielder for Paraguayan Primera División club Olimpia.

== Club career ==
Rodríguez started professional football in 2018 with Cerro Porteño. He played 136 games and won the Apertura in 2020 and the Clausura in 2021. In 2023, he signed for Rosario Central. He won the Copa de la Liga Profesional, coming on in the 81st minute of the final.

In 2025, he was loaned to Remo until the end of the year.

== International career ==
In 2017, Rodríguez was called up for the 2017 FIFA U-17 World Cup.

== Honours ==
Cerro Porteño

- Paraguayan Primera División: 2020 Apertura, 2021 Clausura

Rosario Central

- Copa de la Liga Profesional: 2023

Remo

- Campeonato Paraense: 2025
