= David Miguel =

Brazilian footballer (born 2007)

Personal information
- Full name: David Miguel de Souza Arcanjo
- Date of birth: 11 March 2007 (age 19)
- Place of birth: Recife, Brazil
- Height: 1.81 m (5 ft 11 in)
- Position: Attacking midfielder

Team information
- Current team: Cuiabá
- Number: 88

Youth career
- 2021–2025: Santa Cruz
- 2024–2025: → Cuiabá (loan)

Senior career*
Years	Team	Apps	(Gls)
2024–2025	Santa Cruz	0	(0)
2024–2025	→ Cuiabá (loan)	5	(0)
2025–	Cuiabá	68	(2)
- * Club domestic league appearances and goals as of 18 November 2026

David Miguel de Souza Arcanjo (born 11 March 2007), known as David Miguel or just David, is a Brazilian professional footballer who plays as an attacking midfielder for Cuiabá.

== Career ==
Born in Recife, Pernambuco, David began his career with Santa Cruz. In January 2024, he was loaned to Cuiabá, with a buyout clause.

After playing for the under-17, under-20 and under-23 sides of Dourado, David made his first team – and Série A – debut on 20 November 2024, coming on as a late substitute for Ramon in a 2–1 home loss to Flamengo; aged 17, he became the youngest player to debut for the club. On 20 January of the following year, the club exercised his buyout clause.

== Career statistics ==
As of 5 February 2025.

Appearances and goals by club, season and competition
Club	Season	League			State League		Cup		Continental		Other		Total	
Club	Season	Division	Apps	Goals	Apps	Goals	Apps	Goals	Apps	Goals	Apps	Goals	Apps	Goals
Cuiabá	2024	Série A	5	0	—		0	0	—		3 (Note: Appearance(s) in Copa FMF)	0	8	0
Cuiabá	2025	Série B	0	0	2	0	0	0	—		—		2	0
Career total			5	0	2	0	0	0	0	0	3	0	10	0
