= Caio Vinícius =

Brazilian footballer (born 1999)

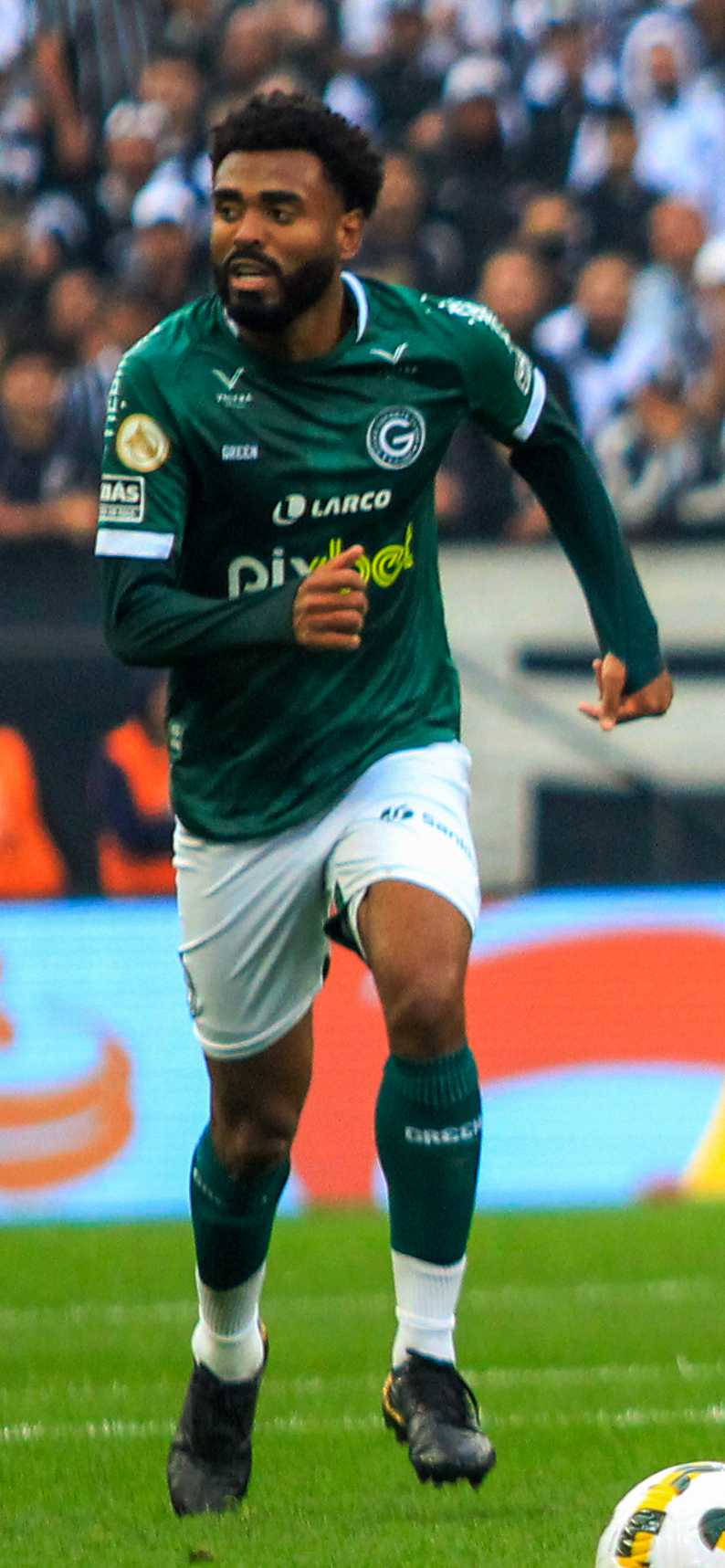

Personal information
- Full name: Caio Vinícius da Conceição
- Date of birth: 11 January 1999 (age 27)
- Place of birth: Itaquaquecetuba, Brazil
- Height: 1.87 m (6 ft 2 in)
- Position: Defensive midfielder

Team information
- Current team: Yunnan Yukun
- Number: 34

Youth career
- Londrina
- 2017–2018: → Fluminense (loan)

Senior career*
| Years | Team | Apps | (Gls) |
| 2018 | Londrina | 0 | (0) |
| 2018 | → Fluminense (loan) | 3 | (1) |
| 2019–2023 | Fluminense | 8 | (0) |
| 2020 | → Atlético Goianiense (loan) | 7 | (0) |
| 2020 | → Oeste (loan) | 25 | (1) |
| 2021–2022 | → Goiás (loan) | 70 | (5) |
| 2024 | Vitória | 22 | (0) |
| 2025 | Remo | 32 | (6) |
| 2026– | Yunnan Yukun | 25 | (5) |
- * Club domestic league appearances and goals as of 8 November 2026

Caio Vinícius da Conceição (born 11 January 1999), known as Caio Vinícius or simply Caio, is a Brazilian footballer who plays as a defensive midfielder for Yunnan Yukun.

== Career statistics ==
As of match played 8 November 2026.

Appearances and goals by club, season and competition
| Club | Season | League | | | State League | | Cup | | Continental | | Other | | Total | |
| Club | Season | Division | Apps | Goals | Apps | Goals | Apps | Goals | Apps | Goals | Apps | Goals | Apps | Goals |
|---|---|---|---|---|---|---|---|---|---|---|---|---|---|---|
| Fluminense | 2018 | Série A | 0 | 0 | 3 (Note: Appearance(s) in Campeonato Carioca) | 1 | 1 | 0 | 1 (Note: Appearance(s) in Copa Sudamericana) | 0 | — | | 5 | 1 |
| Fluminense | 2019 | Série A | 1 | 0 | 0 | 0 | 0 | 0 | 2 | 0 | — | | 3 | 0 |
| Fluminense | 2020 | Série A | 2 | 0 | — | | — | | — | | — | | 2 | 0 |
| Fluminense | 2021 | Série A | — | | 2 | 0 | — | | 0 | 0 | — | | 2 | 0 |
| Fluminense | Total | | 3 | 0 | 5 | 1 | 1 | 0 | 2 | 0 | — | | 12 | 1 |
| Atlético Goianiense (loan) | 2020 | Série A | 0 | 0 | 7 (Note: Appearance(s) in Campeonato Goiano) | 0 | 1 | 0 | — | | — | | 8 | 0 |
| Goiás (loan) | 2021 | Série B | 33 | 2 | — | | — | | — | | — | | 33 | 2 |
| Goiás (loan) | 2022 | Série A | 27 | 0 | 10 | 3 | 4 | 0 | — | | — | | 41 | 3 |
| Goiás (loan) | Total | | 60 | 2 | 10 | 3 | 4 | 0 | — | | — | | 74 | 5 |
| Vitória | 2024 | Série A | 11 | 0 | 9 (Note: Appearance(s) in Campeonato Baiano) | 0 | 0 | 0 | — | | 5 (Note: Appearance(s) in Copa do Nordeste) | 1 | 25 | 1 |
| Vitória | 2025 | Série A | — | | 2 | 0 | 0 | 0 | — | | — | | 2 | 0 |
| Vitória | Total | | 11 | 0 | 11 | 0 | 0 | 0 | — | | 5 | 1 | 27 | 1 |
| Remo | 2025 | Série B | 28 | 5 | 4 (Note: Appearance(s) in Campeonato Paraense) | 1 | 0 | 0 | — | | — | | 32 | 6 |
| Yunnan Yukun | 2026 | Chinese Super League | 25 | 5 | — | | 4 | 2 | — | | — | | 29 | 7 |
| Career total | | | 127 | 12 | 37 | 5 | 10 | 2 | 2 | 0 | 5 | 1 | 181 | 20 |

== Honours ==
Remo

- Campeonato Paraense: 2025
