= Kadu (footballer, born 2005) =

Brazilian footballer

Personal information
- Full name: Carlos Eduardo da Silva Santos
- Date of birth: 16 August 2005 (age 21)
- Place of birth: Belém, Brazil
- Height: 1.77 m (5 ft 10 in)
- Position: Right-back

Team information
- Current team: Botafogo (on loan from Remo)
- Number: 42

Youth career
- 2021–2024: Remo
- 2025–: → Botafogo (loan)

Senior career*
Years	Team	Apps	(Gls)
2025–	Remo	19	(0)
2026–	→ Botafogo (loan)	6	(0)
- * Club domestic league appearances and goals as of 8 April 2026

Carlos Eduardo da Silva Santos (born 16 August 2005) commonly known as Kadu, is a Brazilian professional footballer who plays as a right-back for Botafogo, on loan from Remo.

== Career ==
Kadu made his professional debut at the age of 19, when he started Remo's 5–0 win over São Francisco in the Campeonato Paraense. He provided an assist for Dodô in the team's second goal.

On 12 February 2025, Kadu renewed his contract with Remo until 2027.

== Honours ==
Remo

- Campeonato Paraense: 2025
