= Raylan (footballer) =

Brazilian footballer

Personal information
- Full name: Raylan Reis Ferreira
- Date of birth: 10 March 2000 (age 26)
- Place of birth: Salvador, Brazil
- Height: 1.85 m (6 ft 1 in)
- Position: Right-back

Team information
- Current team: Cuiabá
- Number: 37

Youth career
- Jacuipense
- 2018–2020: → Bahia (loan)

Senior career*
| Years | Team | Apps | (Gls) |
| 2018–2023 | Jacuipense | 57 | (1) |
| 2022 | → Vila Nova (loan) | 24 | (0) |
| 2023 | → Vitória (loan) | 32 | (0) |
| 2024– | Cuiabá | 56 | (0) |
| 2025 | → Avaí (loan) | 21 | (1) |
- * Club domestic league appearances and goals as of 18 November 2026

Raylan Reis Ferreira (born 10 March 2000), simply known as Raylan, is a Brazilian footballer who plays as a right-back for Cuiabá.

== Career ==
Born in Salvador, Bahia, Raylan was a Jacuipense youth graduate. He made his first team debut on 7 March 2018, coming on as a half-time substitute in a 1–0 Campeonato Baiano home loss to Bahia de Feira.

In August 2018, Jacuipense announced the loan of Raylan to Bahia, returning to the youth setup. On 2 March 2020, after failing to make a breakthrough in the first team, his loan was terminated.

Upon returning, Raylan was regularly used in the main squad of Jacuipense, before being loaned to Série B side Vila Nova on 1 August 2022. On 31 October, he agreed to join Vitória also in a temporary deal for the upcoming season.

Raylan was mainly a first-choice during the 2023 Série B, as Vitória achieved promotion as champions, but left the club on 26 December of that year.

== Career statistics ==
As of 15 February 2024

| Club | Season | League | | | State League | | Cup | | Continental | | Other | | Total | |
| Club | Season | Division | Apps | Goals | Apps | Goals | Apps | Goals | Apps | Goals | Apps | Goals | Apps | Goals |
|---|---|---|---|---|---|---|---|---|---|---|---|---|---|---|
| Jacuipense | 2018 | Série D | 0 | 0 | 1 | 0 | — | | — | | — | | 1 | 0 |
| Jacuipense | 2020 | Série C | 12 | 1 | 0 | 0 | — | | — | | — | | 12 | 1 |
| Jacuipense | 2021 | Série C | 9 | 0 | 7 | 0 | — | | — | | 2 (Note: Appearance(s) in Copa do Nordeste) | 0 | 18 | 0 |
| Jacuipense | 2022 | Série D | 16 | 0 | 12 | 0 | — | | — | | — | | 28 | 0 |
| Jacuipense | Total | | 37 | 1 | 20 | 0 | — | | — | | 2 | 0 | 59 | 1 |
| Vila Nova (loan) | 2022 | Série B | 14 | 0 | — | | — | | — | | 3 (Note: Appearance(s) in Copa Verde) | 0 | 17 | 0 |
| Vitória (loan) | 2023 | Série B | 24 | 0 | 8 | 0 | 1 | 0 | — | | 7 | 0 | 40 | 0 |
| Cuiabá | 2024 | Série A | 0 | 0 | 4 | 0 | 0 | 0 | — | | — | | 4 | 0 |
| Career total | | | 75 | 1 | 32 | 0 | 1 | 0 | 0 | 0 | 12 | 0 | 120 | 1 |

== Honours ==
Vitória

- Campeonato Brasileiro Série B: 2023
