= Nathan Camargo =

Brazilian footballer

Nathan
Personal information
- Full name: Nathan Camargo dos Santos
- Date of birth: 25 July 2005 (age 21)
- Place of birth: Limeira, Brazil
- Height: 1.77 m (5 ft 10 in)
- Position: Midfielder

Team information
- Current team: Vila Nova (on loan from Red Bull Bragantino)
- Number: 20

Youth career
- Rio Branco-SP
- 2018: Inter de Limeira
- 2019–2020: Red Bull Brasil
- 2021–2022: Red Bull Bragantino

Senior career*
Years	Team	Apps	(Gls)
2022–	Red Bull Bragantino	9	(0)
2025	→ Guarani (loan)	17	(1)
2025	→ Remo (loan)	13	(0)
2026–	→ Vila Nova (loan)	6	(0)
- * Club domestic league appearances and goals as of 14 April 2026

Nathan Camargo dos Santos (born 25 July 2005), known as Nathan Camargo or just Nathan, is a Brazilian professional footballer who plays as a midfielder for Vila Nova, on loan from Red Bull Bragantino.

== Club career ==
Born in Limeira, São Paulo, Nathan joined Red Bull Brasil's youth setup in 2020, after representing Inter de Limeira and Rio Branco-SP. In 2021, he started to feature for Red Bull Bragantino's youth sides.

Nathan made his professional – and Série A – debut on 14 May 2022, coming on as a second-half substitute for fellow youth graduate Guilherme in a 0–2 away loss against Palmeiras; aged 16 years and nine months, he became the youngest player to play for the side.

== Career statistics ==
As of match played 23 November 2025

Appearances and goals by club, season and competition
Club	Season	League			State league (Note: Includes Campeonato Paulista)		Copa do Brasil		Continental		Other		Total	
Club	Season	Division	Apps	Goals	Apps	Goals	Apps	Goals	Apps	Goals	Apps	Goals	Apps	Goals
Red Bull Bragantino	2022	Série A	6	0	—		0	0	0	0	—		6	0
Red Bull Bragantino	2023	Série A	1	0	2	0	0	0	0	0	—		3	0
Red Bull Bragantino	2024	Série A	0	0	0	0	0	0	0	0	—		0	0
Red Bull Bragantino	Total		7	0	2	0	0	0	0	0	0	0	9	0
Guarani (loan)	2025	Série C	7	0	10	1	0	0	—		—		17	1
Remo (loan)	2025	Série B	13	0	—		—		—		—		13	0
Career total			27	0	12	1	0	0	0	0	0	0	39	1
