= Dodô (footballer, born 1994) =

Brazilian footballer

Personal information
- Full name: Raphael Guimarães de Paula
- Date of birth: 5 September 1994 (age 32)
- Place of birth: Vespasiano, Brazil
- Height: 1.71 m (5 ft 7 1/2 in)
- Position: Attacking midfielder

Team information
- Current team: Vila Nova
- Number: 31

Youth career
- 2005–2014: Atlético Mineiro

Senior career*
Years	Team	Apps	(Gls)
2013–2020	Atlético Mineiro	22	(4)
2016	→ Figueirense (loan)	18	(3)
2017	→ Chapecoense (loan)	2	(0)
2018	→ Botafogo-SP (loan)	14	(1)
2018–2019	→ Fortaleza (loan)	53	(5)
2019–2020	→ Khor Fakkan (loan)	19	(7)
2020–2023	Khor Fakkan	64	(19)
2023–2024	Atlético Goianiense	14	(2)
2024	Ajman	13	(2)
2024	Kazma		
2025–	Remo	19	(3)
2026–	→ Vila Nova (loan)	3	(0)
Medal record
Representing Brazil
Men's Football
Pan American Games
Bronze medal – third place	2015 Toronto	Team competition
- * Club domestic league appearances and goals as of 12:45, 16 December 2025 (UTC)

Raphael Guimarães de Paula (born 5 September 1994), commonly known as Dodô, is a Brazilian footballer who plays as an attacking midfielder for Vila Nova, on loan from Remo.

== Club career ==
Born in Vespasiano, Minas Gerais, Dodô joined Atlético Mineiro's youth setup in 2005, aged 11. He made his professional – and Série A – debut on 9 October 2013, coming on as a late substitute in a 0–2 away loss against Ponte Preta.

On 8 November 2014 Dodô scored his first professional goal, netting the last of a 2–0 away success over Palmeiras. On 2 December, after scoring three further goals, he renewed his contract until 2019.

== Honours ==
Atlético Mineiro

- Copa do Brasil: 2014
- Campeonato Mineiro: 2015

Chapecoense

- Campeonato Catarinense: 2017

Fortaleza

- Campeonato Brasileiro Série B: 2018

Remo

- Campeonato Paraense: 2025
- Super Copa Grão-Pará: 2026
