= Lucão (footballer, born 1993) =

Brazilian footballer

Personal information
- Full name: Lucas Gama Moreira
- Date of birth: 10 July 1993 (age 33)
- Place of birth: Rio de Janeiro, Brazil
- Height: 1.96 m (6 ft 5 in)
- Position: Centre-back

Team information
- Current team: PSS Sleman
- Number: 3

Senior career*
Years	Team	Apps	(Gls)
2013–2014	Bonsucesso	5	(0)
2015–2016	Queimados	14	(0)
2016–2017	Americano	2	(0)
2017–2019	America-RJ	6	(0)
2019	Luverdense	21	(0)
2019–2020	São Bernardo	0	(0)
2020	Votuporanguense	5	(0)
2020–2021	Żejtun Corinthians	22	(0)
2021–2022	Nadur Youngsters	21	(3)
2022–2023	Persikabo 1973	31	(2)
2023–2024	PSIS Semarang	32	(4)
2024	Barito Putera	12	(0)
2025	Remo	5	(1)
2025–2026	Persik Kediri	11	(0)
2025–2026	→ PSS Sleman (loan)	12	(0)
2026–	PSS Sleman	1	(0)
- * Club domestic league appearances and goals as of 4 September 2026

Lucas Gama Moreira (born 10 July 1993), commonly known as Lucão, is a Brazilian professional footballer who plays as a centre-back for Super League club PSS Sleman.

== Club career ==
Born in Brazil, he joined several local Brazilian clubs, and finally decided to go abroad for the first time to Malta and joined Maltese Challenge League side Żejtun Corinthians in the 2020 season.

=== Żejtun Corinthians ===
He was signed for Żejtun Corinthians and played in Maltese Challenge League in 2020–2021 season. Lucão made his league debut on 19 September 2020 as a starter in a 2–2 draw over St. Lucia. On 17 October 2020, he picked up his first win with Żejtun Corinthians in his fourth appearances in a 2–3 away win over Birkirkara. He contributed with 22 league appearances, without scoring during his 2020–2021 season.

=== Nadur Youngsters ===
On 19 August 2021, Gozo Football League First Division club Nadur Youngsters announced a deal for Lucão to join the team on a free transfer. Lucão made his league debut on 3 September 2021 as a starter in a 2–2 draw over Għajnsielem.

On 4 February 2022, Lucão scored his first goal for Nadur in a 0–3 away win over Oratory Youths. Ten days later, Lucão scored the winning goal as Nadur Youngsters win to Victoria Wanderers 1–2, scoring a header following a corner kick by Eder. He added his third goals for the team on 1 April 2022 with one goal against Sannat Lions in a 0–7 away win.

=== Persikabo 1973 ===
On 6 June 2022, Lucão decided to Asia and signed a contract with Liga 1 club Persikabo 1973. Lucão made his league debut on 25 July 2022 as a starter in a 1–0 win over Persebaya Surabaya. On 7 August 2022, Lucão scored his first league goal for Persikabo 1973, opening the scoring in a 2–0 win against Persis Solo.

Until his 29th appearances, he recorded 60 clean tackles and 141 interceptions. In the last season match at Gelora Bandung Lautan Api Stadium on 15 April 2023, Lucão scored the opening goal for the club in 1–4 away win against Persib Bandung. Ahead of the 2023–24 season, Lucão was linked with a move to Persib Bandung. He recorded 31 appearances or 2,790 minutes of play with two goals and one assist at Persikabo 1973 in the 2022–23 Liga 1.

=== PSIS Semarang ===
On 15 June 2023, Lucão contracted by PSIS Semarang. Lucão was recruited by PSIS Semarang because he played quite well last season and has been monitored by the PSIS Semarang coaching team. Lucão made his professional debut on 3 July 2023 in a match against Bhayangkara at the Jatidiri Stadium, Semarang.

== Honours ==
=== Club ===
Nadur Youngsters

- Gozo Football League First Division: 2021–22
