= Leandro Vilela =

Brazilian footballer

Personal information
- Full name: Leandro Vilela Sales Teixeira
- Date of birth: 29 June 1995 (age 31)
- Place of birth: Curitiba, Paraná
- Height: 1.78 m (5 ft 10 in)
- Position: Midfielder

Team information
- Current team: Atlético Goianiense

Youth career
- Paraná

Senior career*
Years	Team	Apps	(Gls)
2014–2019	Paraná	110	(1)
2016	→ J. Malucelli (loan)	5	(0)
2019	→ Vitória (loan)	9	(0)
2019–2020	Vitória de Setúbal	11	(0)
2020–2022	Operário Ferroviário	64	(3)
2022–2023	Guarani	41	(1)
2023	Mirassol	0	(0)
2024–2026	Paysandu	63	(4)
2026–	Atlético Goianiense	3	(0)
- * Club domestic league appearances and goals as of 15 March 2026

Leandro Vilela Sales Teixeira (born 29 June 1995) is a Brazilian footballer who plays for Atlético Goianiense as a midfielder.

== Honours ==
Paysandu

- Campeonato Paraense: 2024
- Copa Verde: 2024, 2025
- Supercopa Grão-Pará: 2025

== Club career ==
A product of the youth academy of Paraná Clube, Vilela impressed the club's technical staff during the 2014 São Paulo Junior Football Cup and was subsequently promoted to the first team. In his first season with the club, he contributed with nine matches (two of which were as a starter) and scoring one goal. On 2 June 2015, he signed a contract extension which would keep him at the club till 2017.

In order to get more first team opportunities, Vilela joined fourth tier club J. Malucelli Futebol on a three month long loan deal on 2 May 2016. He became a regular in the Paraná squad in the 2017 season. During a match against Clube de Regatas Brasil, he won the praise of manager Lisca, who called Vilela a "blank check" for the club. In October, he was ruled out of play for 40 days, following an injury. He contributed with 27 matches as his side won promotion to the Série A.

At the start of the 2018 season, Vilela was appointed as the club captain.

On 7 January 2019, Vilela was loaned out to Vitória for the upcoming season.

On 24 June 2019, he signed a 3-year contract with Portuguese Primeira Liga club Vitória de Setúbal.

== Career statistics ==
As of match played on 26 November 2018

Club	Season	League			State League		Cup		Total	
Club	Season	Division	Apps	Goals	Apps	Goals	Apps	Goals	Apps	Goals
Paraná	2014	Série B	9	1	0	0	0	0	9	1
Paraná	2015	Série B	2	0	6	0	2	0	10	0
Paraná	2016	Série B	2	0	4	0	0	0	6	0
Paraná	2017	Série B	27	0	7	0	10	0	44	0
Paraná	2018	Série A	30	0	9	0	2	0	41	0
Paraná	Total		70	1	22	0	13	0	105	1
J. Malucelli (loan)	2016	Série D	5	0	0	0	0	0	5	0
Career total			75	1	26	0	14	0	115	1

== Personal life ==
Vilela is a supporter of the Paraná Clube. His uncle Emerson Bandido played for the club and was a part of the squad which won promotion to Série A in 2000. Vilela has said that his uncle is a source of inspiration for him.
