= Iván Alvariño =

Argentine footballer

Personal information
- Full name: Alexis Iván Alvariño
- Date of birth: 1 February 2001 (age 25)
- Place of birth: Gregorio de Laferrère, Buenos Aires, Argentina
- Height: 1.84 m (6 ft 0 in)
- Position: Centre-back

Team information
- Current team: Novorizontino (on loan from Remo)
- Number: 22

Youth career
- 2019–2020: Boca Juniors

Senior career*
Years	Team	Apps	(Gls)
2021–2024	Boca Juniors	1	(0)
2022–2023	→ Guarani (loan)	23	(0)
2024	→ Amazonas (loan)	34	(1)
2025–	Remo	13	(0)
2025	→ Amazonas (loan)	17	(0)
2026–	→ Novorizontino (loan)	26	(0)
- * Club domestic league appearances and goals as of 17 November 2026

Alexis Iván Alvariño (born 1 February 2001) is an Argentine footballer who plays as a centre-back for Brazilian club Novorizontino, on loan from Remo.

== Career ==
=== Boca Juniors ===
==== Guarani (loan) ====
On 3 August 2022 Alvariño moved to Brazilian club Guarani on a one-year loan until 30 June 2023.

== Career statistics ==
=== Club ===
As of 16 January 2023.

Club	Season	League			Cup		Continental		Other		Total	
Club	Season	Division	Apps	Goals	Apps	Goals	Apps	Goals	Apps	Goals	Apps	Goals
Boca Juniors	2021	Argentine Primera División	1	0	–		–		–		1	0
Boca Juniors	2022	Argentine Primera División	–		–		0	0	–		0	0
Boca Juniors	Total		1	0	0	0	0	0	0	0	1	0
Guarani (loan)	2022	Série B	6	0	–		–		–		6	0
Guarani (loan)	2023	Série B	9	0	0	0	–		8	0	8	0
Guarani (loan)	Total		15	0	0	0	0	0	8	0	23	0
Career total			24	0	0	0	0	0	0	0	24	0

== Honours ==
Remo

- Campeonato Paraense: 2025

Novorizontino

- Campeonato Brasileiro Série B: 2026
