= Janderson (footballer, born February 1999) =

Brazilian footballer

Personal information
- Full name: Janderson Santos de Souza
- Date of birth: 26 February 1999 (age 27)
- Place of birth: Barreiras, Brazil
- Height: 1.69 m (5 ft 6 1/2 in)
- Position: Forward

Team information
- Current team: Vila Nova
- Number: 99

Youth career
- 2018–2019: Corinthians

Senior career*
Years	Team	Apps	(Gls)
2017–2018	Joinville	6	(0)
2019–2022	Corinthians	34	(3)
2020–2021	→ Atlético Goianiense (loan)	92	(9)
2022	→ Grêmio (loan)	39	(5)
2023–2025	Ceará	51	(5)
2024	→ Atlético Goianiense (loan)	30	(4)
2025	→ Remo (loan)	31	(2)
2026–	Vila Nova	9	(2)
- * Club domestic league appearances and goals as of 14 April 2026

Janderson Santos de Souza (born 26 February 1999 in Barreiras), simply known as Janderson, is a Brazilian professional footballer who plays as a forward for Vila Nova.

== Club career ==
=== Joinville ===
Janderson made his league debut against Cruzeiro on 21 March 2017. He was part of the youth squad from 2016 until August 2018, when he was loaned to Corinthians.

=== Corinthians ===
After good performances at the 2019 Copa São Paulo de Futebol Júnior, Corinthians reached a deal to sign him officially. He made his professional debut in a 2019 Campeonato Brasileiro Série A home match against Chapecoense on May 1. Janderson went on to score his first goal on October 16 against Goiás.

=== Atlético Goianiense ===
Janderson made his league debut against Ceará on 30 August 2020. He scored his first league goal against RB Bragantino on 11 October 2020, scoring in the 28th minute.

=== Grêmio ===
Janderson made his league debut against EC São José on 2 February 2022. He scored his first league goal against Guarany on 6 February 2022, scoring in the 3rd minute.

=== Ceará ===
Janderson made his league debut against Guarani de Juazeiro on 15 January 2023. He scored his first league goal against Maracanã on 28 January 2023, scoring in the 80th minute.

== Career statistics ==
As of 13 October 2021.

Club	Season	League			State League		Cup		Continental		Other		Total	
Club	Season	Division	Apps	Goals	Apps	Goals	Apps	Goals	Apps	Goals	Apps	Goals	Apps	Goals
Joinville	2017	Série C	0	0	0	0	0	0	—		1 (Note: Appearance(s) in Primeira Liga)	0	1	0
Joinville	2018	Série C	5	0	0	0	0	0	—		—		5	0
Joinville	Subtotal		5	0	0	0	0	0	—		1	0	6	0
Corinthians	2019	Série A	20	2	—		0	0	1 (Note: Appearance(s) in Copa Sudamericana)	0	—		21	2
Corinthians	2020	Série A	1	0	10	1	0	0	2 (Note: Appearance(s) in Copa Libertadores)	0	—		13	1
Corinthians	Subtotal		21	2	10	1	0	0	3	0	—		34	3
Atlético Goianiense (loan)	2020	Série A	32	3	4	1	5	0	—		—		41	4
Atlético Goianiense (loan)	2021	Série A	22	0	7	2	4	0	6	0	—		39	2
Atlético Goianiense (loan)	Subtotal		54	3	11	3	9	0	6	0	—		80	6
Grêmio (loan)	2022	Série B	0	0	2	1	0	0	—		—		2	1
	Subtotal		0	0	2	1	0	0	—		—		2	1
Career total			80	5	23	5	9	0	9	0	1	0	122	10

== Honours ==
Grêmio

- Campeonato Gaúcho: 2022
- Recopa Gaúcha: 2022

Ceará

- Copa do Nordeste: 2023
- Campeonato Cearense: 2024

Remo

- Campeonato Paraense: 2025
