= Reynaldo (footballer, born 1997) =

Brazilian footballer

Personal information
- Full name: Reynaldo Cesar Moraes
- Date of birth: 3 January 1997 (age 29)
- Place of birth: Catanduva, Brazil
- Height: 1.86 m (6 ft 1 in)
- Position: Centre-back

Team information
- Current team: Avaí
- Number: 40

Youth career
- 2016: Atlético Paranaense
- 2017: Ponte Preta

Senior career*
Years	Team	Apps	(Gls)
2017–2019	Ponte Preta	11	(0)
2019	→ Tombense (loan)	23	(0)
2020	Juventude	10	(0)
2020–2021	Moreirense	1	(0)
2021–2022	Goiás	77	(0)
2023	Cruzeiro	10	(0)
2023–2024	Coritiba	7	(0)
2024	→ Vitória (loan)	5	(0)
2024	→ Goiás (loan)	6	(0)
2025–2026	Remo	37	(2)
2026–	Al-Arabi		
2026–	Avaí	14	(0)
- * Club domestic league appearances and goals as of 18 November 2026

Reynaldo Cesar Moraes (born 3 January 1997), simply known as Reynaldo, is a Brazilian footballer who plays as a centre-back for Avaí.

== Career statistics ==
As of 11 April 2017

Club	Season	League			State League		Cup		Continental		Other		Total	
Club	Season	Division	Apps	Goals	Apps	Goals	Apps	Goals	Apps	Goals	Apps	Goals	Apps	Goals
Ponte Preta	2017	Série A	—		4	0	0	0	1	0	—		5	0
Career total			0	0	4	0	0	0	1	0	0	0	5	0

== Honours ==
Remo

- Campeonato Paraense: 2025
