= Pedro Castro (footballer, born 1993) =

Brazilian footballer

Personal information
- Full name: Pedro Henrique de Castro Silva
- Date of birth: 5 February 1993 (age 33)
- Place of birth: Volta Redonda, Brazil
- Height: 1.83 m (6 ft 0 in)
- Position: Centre midfielder

Team information
- Current team: CRB
- Number: 21

Youth career
- 2010–2013: Santos

Senior career*
Years	Team	Apps	(Gls)
2012–2016	Santos	11	(0)
2014	→ Espanyol B (loan)	2	(0)
2014	→ Paraná (loan)	3	(0)
2015	→ Santa Cruz (loan)	10	(1)
2016	→ Botafogo-PB (loan)	22	(1)
2017–2022	Tombense	15	(3)
2017	→ Avaí (loan)	32	(3)
2018	→ Sport Recife (loan)	5	(0)
2018–2021	→ Avaí (loan)	116	(6)
2021	→ Botafogo (loan)	37	(4)
2022–2023	Cruzeiro	20	(1)
2023	→ Dibba Al Fujairah (loan)	14	(1)
2023	Khor Fakkan	2	(0)
2024	Avaí	33	(2)
2025	Remo	31	(0)
2026–	CRB	46	(3)
- * Club domestic league appearances and goals as of 16 November 2026

Pedro Henrique de Castro Silva (born 5 February 1993), known as Pedro Castro, is a Brazilian footballer who plays as a centre midfielder for CRB.

== Club career ==
Born in Volta Redonda, Rio de Janeiro, Pedro Castro finished his graduation in prolific Santos FC's youth setup, and was promoted to the first team in January 2012, after impressing with the U-20's.

Pedro Castro made his professional debut on 5 August, starting in a 0–3 away loss against Náutico. On 24 September 2013 he signed a new deal with the club, extending his link until 2016.

On 16 December, Pedro Castro was loaned to La Liga side RCD Espanyol until the end of the European season, with a €5 million buyout clause; a few days later, it was confirmed that he will play initially for the reserves in Segunda División B.

However, Pedro Castro only appeared twice with the B-side during the campaign, and subsequently returned to Peixe. On 22 July 2014 he joined Paraná Clube also in a temporary deal, until the end of the year.

Pedro Castro subsequently had loan spells at Santa Cruz and Botafogo-PB. On 12 January 2017, after the expiration of his contract with Santos, he signed with Tombense.

On 5 June 2017, Pedro Castro signed for Avaí on loan until the end of the year. On 4 January of the following year, he agreed to a one-year deal with Sport Recife, with his federative rights still owned by Tombense, but after being rarely used he returned to Avaí.

== Career statistics ==
As of 6 February 2022

Club	Season	League			State League		Cup		Continental		Other		Total	
Club	Season	Division	Apps	Goals	Apps	Goals	Apps	Goals	Apps	Goals	Apps	Goals	Apps	Goals
Santos	2012	Série A	1	0	0	0	0	0	—		—		1	0
Santos	2013	Série A	10	0	0	0	1	0	—		—		11	0
Santos	Subtotal		11	0	0	0	1	0	—		—		12	0
Espanyol B (loan)	2013–14	Segunda División B	2	0	—		—		—		—		2	0
Paraná (loan)	2014	Série B	3	0	—		—		—		—		3	0
Santa Cruz (loan)	2015	Série B	7	1	3	0	0	0	—		—		10	1
Botafogo-PB (loan)	2016	Série C	17	1	5	0	6	0	—		1 (Note: Appearance(s) in Copa do Nordeste)	0	29	1
Tombense	2017	Série C	4	1	11	2	—		—		—		15	3
Avaí (loan)	2017	Série A	32	3	—		—		—		—		32	3
Sport Recife (loan)	2018	Série A	0	0	5	0	0	0	—		—		5	0
Avaí (loan)	2018	Série B	25	1	—		1	0	—		—		26	1
Avaí (loan)	2019	Série A	27	1	18	0	4	2	—		—		49	3
Avaí (loan)	2020	Série B	36	3	10	1	1	0	—		—		47	4
Avaí (loan)	Subtotal		88	5	28	1	6	2	—		—		122	8
Botafogo (loan)	2021	Série B	30	2	7	2	1	1	—		—		38	3
Cruzeiro (loan)	2022	Série B	0	0	1	0	0	0	—		—		1	0
Career total			194	13	60	5	14	3	0	0	1	0	269	19

== Honours ==
Santos

- Copa São Paulo de Futebol Júnior: 2013

Santa Cruz

- Campeonato Pernambucano: 2015

Avaí

- Campeonato Catarinense: 2019

Botafogo

- Campeonato Brasileiro Série B: 2021

Cruzeiro

- Campeonato Brasileiro Série B: 2022

Remo

- Campeonato Paraense: 2025
