= Cuiabá Esporte Clube =

Brazilian association football club based in Cuiabá, Mato Grosso, Brazil

Cuiabá
- Full name: Cuiabá Esporte Clube
- Nicknames: Dourado (Golden Dourado Fish); Auriverde da Baixada (Green-Gold from the Lowland); Cuiabayern
- Founded: 12 December 2001; 24 years ago
- Ground: Arena Pantanal
- Capacity: 42,968
- SAF Owner: The Dresch family
- President: Alessandro Dresch
- Head coach: Eduardo Barros
- League: Campeonato Brasileiro Série B Campeonato Mato-Grossense
- 2025 2025: Série B, 10th of 20; Mato-Grossense, 2nd of 9
- Website: cuiabaesporteclube.com.br
Home colors	Away colors

Cuiabá Esporte Clube is a Brazilian professional club based in Cuiabá, Mato Grosso founded on 12 December 2001. It competes in the Campeonato Brasileiro Série B, the second division of Brazilian football, as well as in the Campeonato Mato-Grossense, the top flight of the Mato Grosso state football league.

The club plays at Arena Pantanal, one of the stadiums of the 2014 FIFA World Cup. It was founded in 2001 by former player Luís Carlos Tóffoli first as a football academy and amateur club, later it became a fully professional team in 2003, winning a Campeonato Mato-Grossense on its first year, but it soon closed in 2006. In 2009 it was bought and reactivated by the Grupo Dresch and in 2021 the club reached the Campeonato Brasileiro Série A.

Its main achievements include a two-time Copa Verde title and twelve Campeonato Mato-Grossense championships.

== History ==
The club was founded on 12 December 2001 by former player Gaúcho, who was the manager in the club's amateur era. In 2003, they took part of their first professional tournament, the Campeonato Mato-Grossense, and lifted the trophy after defeating Barra do Garças in the finals.

Cuiabá also played in the 2003 Série C, being knocked out by Palmas. In 2004, the club again won the Mato-Grossense, but was knocked out in both the 2004 Copa do Brasil and 2004 Série C.

In December 2006, after a disappointing ninth position in the year's Mato-Grossense, Cuiabá closed their football department. The club only returned to an active status in 2009, after being acquired by the Grupo Dresch, owners of Drebor Borrachas Ltda, a local industry specialized in tires, and competed in the Campeonato Mato-Grossense Segunda Divisão, where they finished second and achieved promotion back to the top tier.

In 2011, Cuiabá lifted the Mato-Grossense after seven years. They also played in that year's Série D, and achieved promotion after finishing third. In the following year, they lost the Mato-Grossense on penalties to Luverdense, and managed to avoid relegation from the Série C.

The club won two consecutive Mato-Grossense titles in 2013 and 2014, and avoided relegation from the Série C. In 2014, the club left their stadium Estádio Eurico Gaspar Dutra and moved to the Arena Pantanal, built for the 2014 FIFA World Cup.

In 2015, Cuiabá won the greatest title in its history to date. After losing the first match to the Remo by 4–1, it obtained a historic turnaround and won by 5–1, obtaining the title of Copa Verde of that year. With the title, the club secured a place in the Copa Sudamericana the following year and participated for the first time in an international competition. Cuiabá was eliminated in the second round by Chapecoense.

In 2018 and 2019, Cuiabá won two consecutive Mato-Grossense titles without a single defeat, and was promoted to the Série B in 2019. In 2021, the club was promoted to the Série A for the first time in their history after finishing in 4th place, and became the first team from Mato Grosso to play in the first division since CEOV's participation in the 1986 edition.

== Supporters ==
Since 2010 when Cuiabá began to invest more in its cast and was gaining prestige in its city earning local titles and having access to the third national division, quickly was gaining strength of the local press and of the inhabitants of the region, and with that strength increased very much their number of fans. In 2011 was founded its first organized fans, who had a reputation at all home games for being very festive, colorful and noisy.

The highlight of this growth was during the 2018 Campeonato Brasileiro Série C finals, where Cuiabá broke the attendance record at the Arena Pantanal, previously belonging to a World Cup game, and gathered more than 41 thousand fans in the final of the competition.

== Stadium ==
Cuiabá play their home games at Arena Pantanal. The stadium, which was built for the 2014 FIFA World Cup, has a maximum capacity of 42,968 people. Before the construction of the new stadium, the club played their home games at Estádio Eurico Gaspar Dutra, with a capacity of 4,500 people.

== Rivalries ==
One of the biggest rivalries is against Luverdense from the city of Lucas do Rio Verde located 330km from Cuiabá, known as the Clássico Ouro-Verde (Golden-Green Classic). This game is considered to be the greatest derby in Mato Grosso today because the two teams are the largest forces in state football, as well as being a team match between the capital and the interior of Mato Grosso.

Mixto is the main intra-city rival, it is a much older and traditional team than Cuiabá but it has been less successful in a national scale. It is known as Dérbi Cuiabano (Cuiabá Derby).

== Players ==
=== First team squad ===
As of 22 September 2026

Note: Flags indicate national team as defined under FIFA eligibility rules; some limited exceptions apply. Players may hold more than one non-FIFA nationality.

No.	Pos.	Nation	Player
1	GK	BRA	João Carlos (captain)
2	DF	BRA	Igor Inocêncio
4	DF	BRA	Vitor Mendes
5	MF	BRA	Calebe
7	FW	BRA	Ramon (on loan from Gama)
8	MF	BRA	Pepê (on loan from Vitória)
11	FW	BRA	Eliel
12	GK	BRA	Gustavo Busatto
13	DF	BRA	João Basso
14	DF	BRA	Eric Melo
20	MF	BRA	David Miguel
23	MF	BRA	Marcos Júnior
27	FW	BRA	Rodrigo Rodrigues (on loan from Mirassol)
29	FW	BRA	Vinícius Peixoto
30	MF	BRA	Raul (on loan from Athletico Paranaense)

No.	Pos.	Nation	Player
31	GK	BRA	Marcelo Carné
33	DF	BRA	Alan Empereur
34	GK	BRA	Jean Carlos (on loan from Anapolina)
36	DF	BRA	Lorenzo
37	DF	BRA	Raylan
41	FW	BRA	Kauan Cristtyan
53	MF	BRA	Weverson
59	DF	BRA	Tarcísio
70	MF	BRA	Wesley Dias
77	FW	BRA	Jean Dias
90	FW	BRA	Fábio Gomes
91	DF	BRA	Luis Soares
96	FW	BRA	Pedro Henrique
97	MF	BRA	Luiz Otávio

=== Youth players ===
Note: Flags indicate national team as defined under FIFA eligibility rules; some limited exceptions apply. Players may hold more than one non-FIFA nationality.

No.	Pos.	Nation	Player
26	DF	BRA	João Silva
55	DF	BRA	Oscar
57	FW	BRA	Aiyran

No.	Pos.	Nation	Player
71	FW	BRA	Diodato
82	GK	BRA	João Chaves
99	FW	BRA	Nathan Cruz

=== Out on loan ===
Note: Flags indicate national team as defined under FIFA eligibility rules; some limited exceptions apply. Players may hold more than one non-FIFA nationality.

No.	Pos.	Nation	Player
—	DF	BRA	Guilherme Mariano (at Botafogo-SP until 30 November 2026)
—	DF	BRA	Léo Ataíde (at Brusque until 30 November 2026)
—	DF	BRA	Marcelo Henrique (at Athletic-MG until 30 November 2026)
—	DF	BRA	Gabriel Knesowitsch (at Mirassol until 31 December 2026)
—	MF	BRA	Eduardo Vinícius (at CRAC until 30 September 2026)

No.	Pos.	Nation	Player
—	MF	BRA	Fernando Sobral (at Coritiba until 31 December 2026)
—	MF	BRA	Lucas Mineiro (at Juventude until 30 November 2026)
—	MF	BRA	Luiz Felipe (at Anápolis until 30 November 2026)
—	MF	BRA	Max Alves (at Chapecoense until 31 December 2026)

=== First-team staff ===
As of 7 December 2024

Position	Name
Head coach	(Brazil) Bernardo Franco
Assistant coach	(Brazil) Julian Tobar
Assistant coach	(Brazil) Marcão
Fitness coach	(Brazil) Jean Carlo
Goalkeeper coach	(Brazil) Marcos Medeiros

== Honours ==
=== Official tournaments ===
Regional
Competitions	Titles	Seasons
Copa Verde	2	2015, 2019
State
Competitions	Titles	Seasons
Campeonato Mato-Grossense	13	2003, 2004, 2011, 2013, 2014, 2015, 2017, 2018, 2019, 2021, 2022, 2023, 2024
Copa FMF	2	2010, 2016

=== Runners-up ===
- Campeonato Brasileiro Série C (1): 2018
- Campeonato Mato-Grossense (2): 2012, 2025
- Copa FMF (5): 2004, 2009, 2017, 2019, 2023
- Campeonato Mato-Grossense Second Division (1): 2009

=== Youth team ===
- Campeonato Brasileiro Sub-23 (1): 2022
