= Ramón Martínez (footballer, born 1996) =

Paraguayan footballer

Personal information
- Full name: Ramón Martínez López
- Date of birth: 4 January 1996 (age 30)
- Place of birth: Asunción, Paraguay
- Height: 1.86 m (6 ft 1 in)
- Position: Midfielder

Team information
- Current team: Deportes Limache
- Number: 27

Youth career
- Guaraní

Senior career*
Years	Team	Apps	(Gls)
2015–2019	Guaraní	57	(6)
2019–2022	Atlético Mineiro	11	(0)
2020–2021	→ Coritiba (loan)	9	(0)
2021–2022	→ Libertad (loan)	31	(4)
2022	→ Novorizontino (loan)	11	(0)
2023–2024	Olimpia	33	(2)
2025	Paysandu	20	(0)
2026–	Deportes Limache	1	(0)

International career^{‡}
2019–	Paraguay	4	(0)
- * Club domestic league appearances and goals as of 1 February 2026 ‡ National team caps and goals as of 19 November 2019

Ramón Martínez López (born 4 January 1996) is a Paraguayan footballer who plays as a midfielder for Chilean Primera División club Deportes Limache.

== Career ==
On 23 December 2025, Martínez signed with Chilean Primera División club Deportes Limache.

== Honours ==
Guaraní

- Paraguayan Primera División: 2016 Clausura
- Copa Paraguay: 2018

Atlético Mineiro

- Campeonato Mineiro: 2020

Libertad

- Paraguayan Primera División: 2021 Apertura

Paysandu

- Copa Verde: 2025
