= 2026 Super Copa Grão-Pará =

Remo	Águia de Marabá
2	1
- Date: 18 January 2026
- Venue: Mangueirão, Belém
- Referee: Joelson Nazareno Ferreira Cardoso
- Attendance: 27,543

The 2026 Super Copa Grão-Pará was the 3rd Super Copa Grão-Pará, a football match played between the winners of the previous season's Campeonato Paraense and Copa Grão-Pará competitions. The match was contested between Remo and Águia de Marabá.

Remo defeated Águia de Marabá 2–1 for their 1st Super Copa Grão-Pará title.

== Teams ==
Team	Qualification method
Remo	2025 Campeonato Paraense champions
Águia de Marabá	2025 Copa Grão-Pará champions

== Match ==
18 January 2026
17:00 UTC−3

Remo	2–1	Águia de Marabá
Yago Pikachu 77'; Eduardo Melo 89'	Report	PH 55'

Mangueirão, Belém
Attendance: 27,543
Referee: Joelson Nazareno Ferreira Cardoso

Remo	Águia de Marabá

Assistant referees:
Jhonathan Leone Lopes
Nayara Lucena Soares
Fourth official:
Olivaldo José Alves Moraes
Video assistant referee:
Gustavo Ramos Melo
Assistant video assistant referee:
Luís Diego Nascimento Lopes

Match rules

- 90 minutes
- Penalty shoot-out if scores still level
