= 2025 Campeonato Paraense =

Campeonato Paraense
- Season: 2025
- Dates: 18 January – 11 May
- Champions: Remo (48th title)
- Relegated: Independente; Caeté
- Série D: Tuna Luso; Águia de Marabá
- Copa do Brasil: Remo (as Série A team); Paysandu (as Copa Verde winners); Tuna Luso; Bragantino; Castanhal
- Copa Norte: Remo; Paysandu
- Matches: 56
- Goals: 138 (2.46 per match)
- Top goalscorer: Nicolas; Rossi (6 goals each)
- Biggest home win: Remo 5–0 São Francisco (18 January 2025)
- Biggest away win: Caeté 0–4 Remo (26 January 2025); Independente 0–4 São Francisco (28 January 2025)
- Highest scoring: Águia de Marabá 2–4 Paysandu (25 January 2025); Castanhal 3–3 Tuna Luso (30 March 2025)
- Highest attendance: 47,555; Remo 0–1 Paysandu (11 May 2025)
- Lowest attendance: 299; Santa Rosa 1–3 Independente (19 January 2025)

The 2025 Campeonato Paraense was the 113th edition of Pará's top professional football league. The competition started on 18 January and ended on 11 May. Remo won the championship for the 48th time.

== Format ==
Three groups with four clubs, with the teams of one group facing those of the other two. The eight best teams in the overall standings advance to the final stage. The matches of the quarter-finals and semi-finals will be played on a single-legged ties. The finals will be played on a home-and-away two-legged basis.

The two worst teams in the overall standings will be relegated to the 2026 Campeonato Paraense Second Division. The four teams eliminated in the quarter-finals and the two teams eliminated in the semi-finals will be transferred to the Copa Grão-Pará.

With the changes made by the CBF in October, the champion, the runner-up and the 3rd-placed team qualify to the 2026 Copa do Brasil. The champion and the runner-up qualify to the 2026 Copa Norte. The best two teams who isn't on Campeonato Brasileiro Série A, Série B or Série C qualifies to 2026 Campeonato Brasileiro Série D.

== Participating teams ==
Locations of the 2025 Campeonato Paraense teams
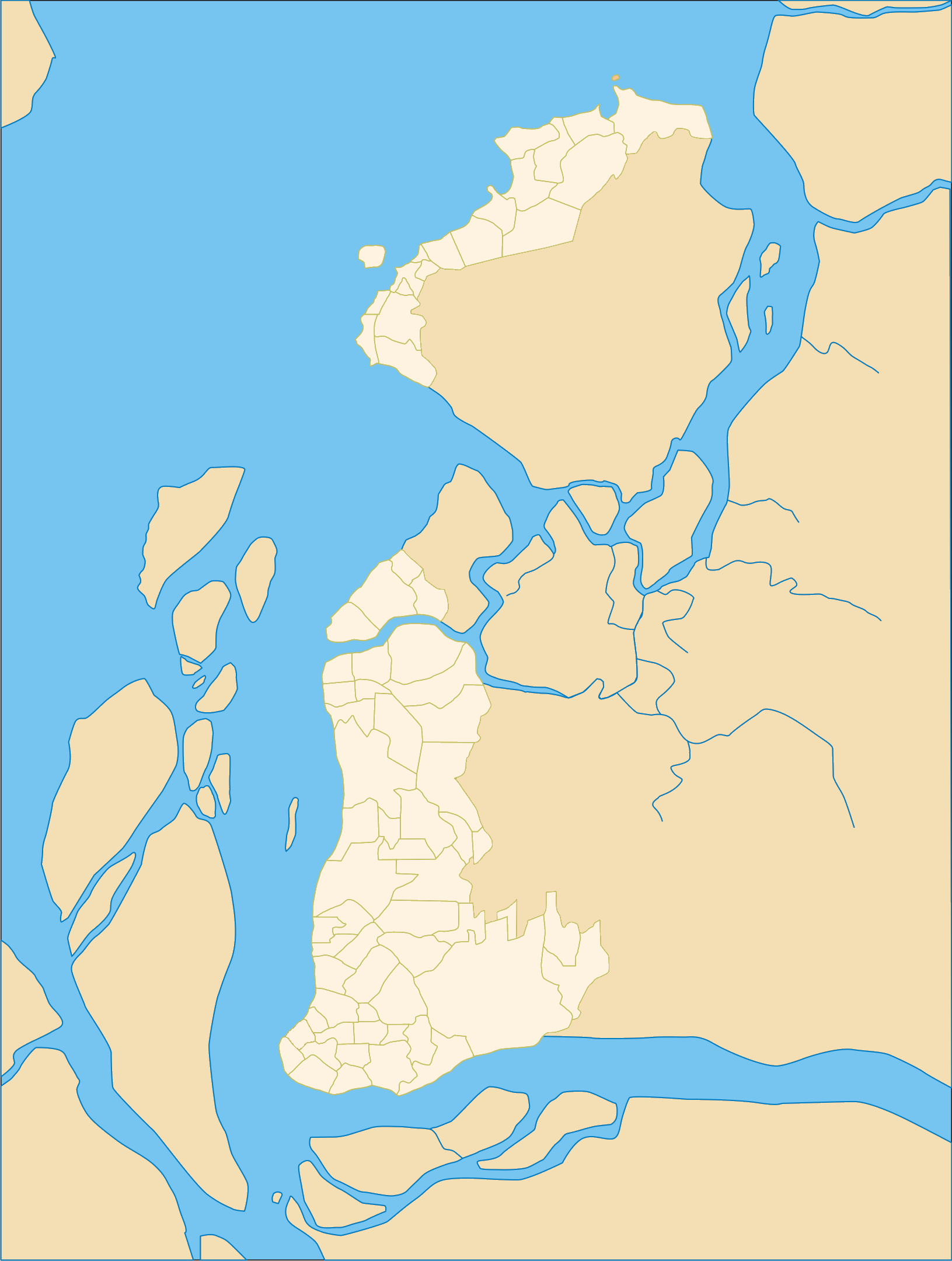
Locations of the 2025 Campeonato Paraense teams – Belém

Club	Home city	Head coach	2024 result
Águia de Marabá	Marabá	Sílvio Criciúma	4th
Bragantino	Bragança	Robson Melo	8th
Caeté	Bragança	Léo Goiano	6th
Cametá	Cametá	John Fabrício	9th
Capitão Poço	Capitão Poço	Rogerinho Gameleira	2nd (2nd Division)
Castanhal	Castanhal	Jairo Nascimento	10th
Independente	Tucuruí	Gilberto Pereira	1st (2nd Division)
Paysandu	Belém	Luizinho Lopes	1st
Remo	Belém	Daniel Paulista	2nd
Santa Rosa	Belém	Thiago Eduardo	7th
São Francisco	Santarém	Samuel Cândido	5th
Tuna Luso	Belém	Ignácio Neto	3rd

=== Managerial changes ===
Team	Outgoing manager	Date of vacancy	Incoming manager	Date of appointment
Santa Rosa	Pedro Chaves	26 January 2025	Thiago Eduardo	1 February 2025
Caeté	Carlos Pereira	30 January 2025	Léo Goiano	30 January 2025
Independente	Wallace Lemos	2 February 2025	Gilberto Pereira	13 February 2025
Paysandu	Márcio Fernandes	9 February 2025	Luizinho Lopes	10 February 2025
Cametá	Rodrigo Reis	17 February 2025	John Fabrício	17 February 2025
Remo	Rodrigo Santana	13 March 2025	Daniel Paulista	13 March 2025

== League phase ==
Pos	Team	Pld	W	D	L	GF	GA	GD	Pts	Qualification or relegation
1	Remo	8	5	2	1	17	4	+13	17	Advance to the Final stage
2	Paysandu	8	5	2	1	15	7	+8	17	Advance to the Final stage
3	Bragantino	8	5	2	1	11	6	+5	17	Advance to the Final stage
4	Castanhal	8	3	4	1	10	7	+3	13	Advance to the Final stage
5	Tuna Luso	8	3	2	3	12	12	0	11	Advance to the Final stage
6	Águia de Marabá	8	3	2	3	9	10	−1	11	Advance to the Final stage
7	Capitão Poço	8	2	5	1	9	9	0	11	Advance to the Final stage
8	Santa Rosa	8	3	1	4	7	9	−2	10	Advance to the Final stage
9	Cametá	8	3	1	4	6	11	−5	10	
10	São Francisco	8	2	0	6	9	16	−7	6	
11	Independente (R)	8	1	3	4	5	12	−7	6	2026 Paraense 2nd Division
12	Caeté (R)	8	1	0	7	5	12	−7	3	2026 Paraense 2nd Division

Source: Globo Esporte
(R) Relegated

== Final stage ==
=== Quarter-finals ===
Team 1	Score	Team 2
Remo	2–0	Santa Rosa
Castanhal	3–3 (4–5 p)	Tuna Luso
Paysandu	2–0	Capitão Poço
Bragantino	0–0 (3–5 p)	Águia de Marabá

=== Semi-finals ===
Team 1	Score	Team 2
Remo	2–1	Tuna Luso
Paysandu	3–1	Águia de Marabá

=== Finals ===
7 May 2025
21:00 UTC –3

Paysandu	2–3	Remo
Rossi 41' (pen.); Benítez 42'	Report	Janderson 10'; Klaus 22'; Sávio 60'

Mangueirão, Belém
Attendance: 38,358
Referee: Anderson Daronco
11 May 2025
17:00 UTC –3

Remo	0–1	Paysandu
	Report	Rossi 59' (pen.)
Penalties
Pedro Castro (penalty missed); Dodô (penalty scored); Pedro Rocha (penalty scored); Alvariño (penalty scored); Adaílton (penalty scored); Marcelinho (penalty scored); Reynaldo (penalty scored)	6–5	(penalty scored) Bryan; (penalty missed) Benítez; (penalty scored) André Lima; (penalty scored) Leandro Vilela; (penalty scored) Giovanni; (penalty scored) Quintana; (penalty missed) Dudu Vieira

Mangueirão, Belém
Attendance: 47,555
Referee: Rodrigo José Pereira de Lima

Tied 3–3 on aggregate, Remo won on penalties.
