= Super Copa Grão-Pará =

- Organiser(s): Federação Paraense de Futebol
- Founded: 2024; 2 years ago
- Region: Pará
- Teams: 2
- Current champions: Remo (1st title)
- Most championships: Águia de Marabá; Paysandu; Remo (1 title each)
- Broadcaster: TV Cultura do Pará
- 2026 Super Copa Grão-Pará

The Super Copa Grão-Pará is a state association football trophy organized by the Federação Paraense de Futebol. It is contested between the champion of the Campeonato Paraense and the winner of the Copa Grão-Pará of the previous year. It opens officially the Pará football season by defining the super champion at the beginning of the football cycle. In its first edition, in 2024, the trophy was contested exceptionally between the champions of the Campeonato Paraense and the Campeonato Paraense Second Division.

== List of champions ==
Season	Champions	Score	Runners-up
2024	Águia de Marabá	1–0	Canaã
2025	Paysandu	2–0	Tuna Luso
2026	Remo	2–1	Águia de Marabá
