= 2026 Campeonato Paraense finals =

- Event: 2026 Campeonato Paraense
Remo	Paysandu
1	2
- on aggregate

First leg
Remo	Paysandu
1	2
- Date: 1 March 2026
- Venue: Mangueirão, Belém
- Referee: Ramon Abatti
- Attendance: 24,816

Second leg
Paysandu	Remo
0	0
- Date: 8 March 2026
- Venue: Mangueirão, Belém
- Referee: Wagner do Nascimento Magalhães
- Attendance: 46,809

The 2026 Campeonato Paraense finals was the final that decided the 2026 Campeonato Paraense, the 114th season of the Campeonato Paraense. The final were contested between Remo and Paysandu.

Paysandu defeated Remo 2–1 on aggregate to win their 51th Campeonato Paraense title.

== Road to the final ==
Note: In all scores below, the score of the finalist is given first.

Remo			Round	Paysandu		
Opponent	Venue	Score		Opponent	Venue	Score
Pos / Team / Pld / Pts; 3 / Paysandu (A) / 6 / 10; 4 / Águia de Marabá (A) / 6 / 10; 5 / Remo (A) / 6 / 10; 6 / Tuna Luso (A) / 6 / 9; 7 / Castanhal (A) / 6 / 8; Updated to match(es) played on 15 February 2026. Source: Globo Esporte (A) Advance to a further round			League phase	Pos / Team / Pld / Pts; 1 / Cametá (A) / 6 / 11; 2 / Capitão Poço (A) / 6 / 10; 3 / Paysandu (A) / 6 / 10; 4 / Águia de Marabá (A) / 6 / 10; 5 / Remo (A) / 6 / 10; Updated to match(es) played on 15 February 2026. Source: Globo Esporte (A) Advance to a further round		
Águia de Marabá	Away	1–1 (5–4 p)	Quarter-finals	Tuna Luso	Home	5–1
Cametá	Away	3–2	Semi-finals	Castanhal	Home	1–0

== Format ==
The finals were played on a home-and-away two-legged basis. If tied on aggregate, the penalty shoot-out was used to determine the winner.

== Matches ==
=== First leg ===
1 March 2026
17:00 UTC−3

Remo	1–2	Paysandu
João Pedro 75' (pen.)	Report	Caio Mello 6'; Marcinho 32'

Mangueirão, Belém
Attendance: 24,816
Referee: Ramon Abatti (Santa Catarina)

Remo	Paysandu

GK	88	(Brazil) Marcelo Rangel
DF	2	(Brazil) João Lucas
DF	13	(Brazil) Marllon (c)
DF	5	(Brazil) Léo Andrade	(yellow card) 45+4'	(substituted off) 46'
MF	55	(Brazil) Zé Ricardo	(yellow card) 51'	(substituted off) 61'
MF	12	(Brazil) Patrick de Paula		(substituted off) 61'
MF	22	(Brazil) Yago Pikachu		(substituted off) 46'
MF	15	(Brazil) Vitor Bueno	(yellow card) 88'
FW	33	(Uruguay) Diego Hernández		(substituted off) 46'
FW	11	(Brazil) Alef Manga
FW	45	(Guinea-Bissau) João Pedro
Substitutes:
GK	97	(Brazil) Ivan
DF	3	(Brazil) Thalisson		(substituted on) 61'
DF	24	(Argentina) Braian Cufré
DF	79	(Brazil) Marcelinho		(substituted on) 46'
MF	7	(Brazil) Giovanni Pavani
MF	14	(Argentina) Leonel Picco		(substituted on) 46'
MF	23	(Uruguay) Franco Catarozzi		(substituted on) 61'
MF	28	(Brazil) Zé Welison
FW	25	(Uruguay) Nicolás Ferreira		(substituted on) 46'
Coach:
(Colombia) Juan Carlos Osorio

GK	12	(Brazil) Gabriel Mesquita
DF	2	(Brazil) Edílson
DF	15	(Brazil) Castro
DF	6	(Brazil) Luccão		(substituted off) 50'
DF	31	(Uruguay) Facundo Bonifazi
MF	8	(Brazil) Caio Mello		(substituted off) 84'
MF	39	(Brazil) Pedro Henrique
MF	10	(Brazil) Marcinho (c)	(yellow card) 53'
FW	19	(Brazil) Thayllon	(yellow card) 19'	(substituted off) 84'
FW	75	(Brazil) Kleiton Pego		(substituted off) 45+2'
FW	9	(Brazil) Ítalo		(substituted off) 84'
Substitutes:
GK	1	(Brazil) Jean Drosny
DF	4	(Brazil) Iarley		(substituted on) 50'
DF	26	(Brazil) Cauã Libonati
DF	57	(Brazil) JP Galvão
MF	5	(Brazil) Henrico		(substituted on) 84'
MF	17	(Brazil) Henrique Salomoni
MF	20	(Brazil) Matheus Capixaba
MF	23	(Brazil) Brian
FW	11	(Brazil) Danilo Peu		(substituted on) 84'
FW	21	(Brazil) Miguel Ângelo
FW	30	(Brazil) Thalyson		(substituted on) 84'
FW	94	(Brazil) Kauã Hinkel		(substituted on) 45+2'
Coach:
(Brazil) Júnior Rocha

Assistant referees:
Bruno Boschilia (Paraná)
Fábio Pereira (Tocantins)
Fourth official:
Dewson Fernando Freitas da Silva (Pará)
Fifth official:
Thânia Lopes da Silva (Pará)
Video assistant referee:
Gilberto Rodrigues Castro Júnior (Pernambuco)
Assistant video assistant referee:
Herman Brumel Vani (São Paulo)

=== Second leg ===
8 March 2026
17:00 UTC−3

Paysandu	0–0	Remo
	Report

Mangueirão, Belém
Attendance: 46,809
Referee: Wagner do Nascimento Magalhães (Rio de Janeiro)

Paysandu	Remo

GK	12	(Brazil) Gabriel Mesquita
DF	2	(Brazil) Edílson
DF	15	(Brazil) Castro
DF	6	(Brazil) Luccão		(substituted off) 56'
DF	31	(Uruguay) Facundo Bonifazi		(substituted off) 70'
MF	8	(Brazil) Caio Mello		(substituted off) 70'
MF	39	(Brazil) Pedro Henrique	(yellow card) 88'
MF	10	(Brazil) Marcinho (c)	(yellow card) 79'
FW	19	(Brazil) Thayllon		(substituted off) 51'
FW	75	(Brazil) Kleiton Pego
FW	9	(Brazil) Ítalo		(substituted off) 70'
Substitutes:
GK	1	(Brazil) Jean Drosny
DF	4	(Brazil) Iarley		(substituted on) 56'
DF	26	(Brazil) Cauã Libonati
DF	57	(Brazil) JP Galvão		(substituted on) 70'
MF	5	(Brazil) Henrico		(substituted on) 70'
MF	17	(Brazil) Henrique Salomoni
MF	20	(Brazil) Matheus Capixaba
MF	23	(Brazil) Brian
FW	11	(Brazil) Danilo Peu		(substituted on) 70'
FW	21	(Brazil) Miguel Ângelo
FW	30	(Brazil) Thalyson
FW	94	(Brazil) Kauã Hinkel		(substituted on) 51'
Coach:
(Brazil) Júnior Rocha

GK	88	(Brazil) Marcelo Rangel
DF	2	(Brazil) João Lucas
DF	13	(Brazil) Marllon (c)	(yellow card) 85'
DF	27	(Brazil) Kayky Almeida
DF	24	(Argentina) Braian Cufré		(substituted off) 46'
MF	14	(Argentina) Leonel Picco		(substituted off) 63'
MF	12	(Brazil) Patrick de Paula
MF	15	(Brazil) Vitor Bueno		(substituted off) 83'
FW	22	(Brazil) Yago Pikachu		(substituted off) 71'
FW	11	(Brazil) Alef Manga
FW	45	(Guinea-Bissau) João Pedro		(substituted off) 71'
Substitutes:
GK	94	(Brazil) Ygor Vinhas
DF	3	(Brazil) Thalisson
DF	5	(Brazil) Léo Andrade
DF	16	(Brazil) Sávio		(substituted on) 46'
DF	79	(Brazil) Marcelinho
MF	8	(Brazil) Patrick
MF	28	(Brazil) Zé Welison
MF	55	(Brazil) Zé Ricardo	(yellow card) 90+3'	(substituted on) 63'
FW	9	(Brazil) Carlinhos		(substituted on) 71'
FW	25	(Uruguay) Nicolás Ferreira		(substituted on) 83'
FW	33	(Uruguay) Diego Hernández		(substituted on) 71'
FW	71	(Argentina) Rafael Monti
Assistant Coach:
(Brazil) Flávio Garcia

Assistant referees:
Guilherme Dias Camilo (Minas Gerais)
Anne Kesy Gomes de Sá (Amazonas)
Fourth official:
Deborah Cecilia Cruz Correia (Pernambuco)
Fifth official:
Felipe Souza da Silva (Pará)
Video assistant referee:
Diego Pombo Lopez (Bahia)
Assistant video assistant referee:
Lilian da Silva Fernandes Bruno (São Paulo)
