= 2026 Clube do Remo season =

2026 season of Brazilian association football team

Remo
2026 season
- President: Antônio Carlos Teixeira
- Head coach: Juan Carlos Osorio (until 1 March 2026); Léo Condé (until 15 September 2026); Thiago Carpini
- Stadium: Baenão; Mangueirão
- Campeonato Brasileiro Série A: 19th
- Campeonato Paraense: 2nd
- Copa do Brasil: Round of 16
- Copa Norte: Group stage
- Super Copa Grão-Pará: Winners
- Highest home attendance: 51,567 v Flamengo (6 September 2026, Série A)
- Lowest home attendance: 1,669 v Galvez (29 April 2026, Copa Norte)
Home colors	Away colors	Third colors

The 2026 season is the 113th in Remo's existence. This season Remo participate in the Campeonato Brasileiro Série A, the Campeonato Paraense, the Copa do Brasil, the Copa Norte and the Super Copa Grão-Pará.

On 22 November, the club was officially relegated to Série B after only one season, with two matchdays remaining.

== Players ==
=== Squad information ===
As of 22 November 2026

Notes:

- Numbers in parentheses denote appearances as substitute.
- Y – Youth players to have featured in a first-team appearance for Remo.

No.	Position	Nat.	Name	Date of Birth (Age)		
No.	Position	Nat.	Name	Date of Birth (Age)	Apps	Goals
2	DF	BRA	João Lucas	9 March 1998 (age 28)	11	0
4	DF	BRA	Matheus Felipe	9 November 1998 (age 28)	5	0
5	DF	BRA	Léo Andrade	18 April 1998 (age 28)	8 (3)	0
6	DF	BRA	Marlon	13 February 1994 (age 32)	12 (1)	0
7	FW	BRA	Jajá	12 November 1998 (age 28)	27 (9)	10
8	MF	BRA	Patrick	29 July 1992 (age 34)	26 (9)	2
9	FW	BRA	Gabriel Poveda	7 July 1998 (age 28)	5 (15)	1
10	MF	BRA	Jáderson	12 August 2000 (age 26)	8 (13)	0
13	DF	BRA	Marllon	16 April 1992 (age 34)	41 (3)	2
14	MF	ARG	Leonel Picco	22 October 1998 (age 28)	26 (15)	4
15	MF	BRA	Vitor Bueno	5 September 1994 (age 32)	17 (15)	4
18	DF	CMR	Duplexe Tchamba	10 July 1998 (age 28)	27	1
19	FW	BRA	Gabriel Taliari	13 April 1997 (age 29)	20 (7)	5
20	FW	COL	Andrés González (Y)	29 June 2006 (age 20)	0 (2)	0
21	FW	PAR	Antonio Galeano	22 March 2000 (age 26)	7 (5)	1
22	FW	BRA	Yago Pikachu	5 June 1992 (age 34)	33 (15)	7
26	MF	BRA	David Braga	11 December 2001 (age 24)	7 (14)	2
27	DF	BRA	Zé Ivaldo	21 February 1997 (age 29)	11 (1)	0
28	MF	BRA	Zé Welison	11 May 1995 (age 31)	32 (8)	1
35	MF	BRA	Edson Fernando	24 April 1998 (age 28)	1 (7)	0
39	FW	BRA	Eduardo Melo	13 May 2001 (age 25)	6 (7)	3
55	MF	BRA	Zé Ricardo	3 February 1999 (age 27)	34 (11)	1
61	FW	BRA	Tico (Y)	21 September 2006 (age 20)	0 (7)	0
62	MF	BRA	Rafael (Y)	11 March 2006 (age 20)	0 (1)	0
64	FW	BRA	Paulo Henrique (Y)	5 August 2007 (age 19)	0 (1)	0
65	MF	BRA	Miguel (Y)	5 February 2006 (age 20)	0 (2)	0
77	DF	BRA	Mayk	31 August 1999 (age 27)	20 (4)	0
79	DF	BRA	Marcelinho	20 July 1998 (age 28)	36 (4)	2
88	GK	BRA	Marcelo Rangel	17 May 1988 (age 38)	44	0
94	GK	BRA	Ygor Vinhas	15 April 1994 (age 32)	5	0
97	GK	BRA	Ivan	7 February 1997 (age 29)	7	0
—	DF	BRA	Matheus Alexandre	7 April 1999 (age 27)	4 (13)	0
Out on loan
31	MF	BRA	Dodô	5 September 1994 (age 32)	1 (1)	0
38	FW	BRA	Marrony	5 February 1999 (age 27)	1 (3)	0
—	DF	ARG	Iván Alvariño	1 February 2001 (age 25)	0	0
Players left the club during the playing season
3	DF	BRA	Thalisson	20 January 2002 (aged 24)	4 (2)	1
4	DF	BRA	William Klaus	11 January 1994 (aged 32)	4	0
6	DF	BRA	Jorge	28 March 1996 (aged 29)	1 (2)	0
7	MF	BRA	Giovanni Pavani	22 November 1996 (aged 29)	7 (4)	2
9	FW	BRA	Carlinhos	12 February 1997 (aged 29)	5 (1)	1
11	FW	BRA	Alef Manga	29 November 1994 (aged 31)	27 (13)	6
12	MF	BRA	Patrick de Paula	8 September 1999 (aged 26)	12 (2)	2
16	DF	BRA	Sávio	26 May 1995 (aged 30)	4 (1)	0
17	DF	URU	Cristian Tassano	23 July 1996 (aged 30)	6 (1)	0
20	MF	COL	Víctor Cantillo	15 October 1993 (aged 32)	5 (1)	0
21	MF	BRA	Yago Ferreira	2 August 2001 (aged 24)	0	0
23	MF	URU	Franco Catarozzi	2 April 2000 (aged 26)	1 (4)	1
24	DF	ARG	Braian Cufré	15 December 1996 (aged 29)	8 (2)	1
25	FW	URU	Nicolás Ferreira	7 February 2002 (aged 24)	4 (6)	2
27	DF	BRA	Kayky Almeida	1 May 2005 (aged 21)	13 (3)	0
33	FW	URU	Diego Hernández	22 June 2000 (aged 26)	8 (11)	0
35	MF	BRA	Freitas	4 March 2003 (aged 23)	4 (1)	0
45	FW	GNB	João Pedro	13 November 1996 (aged 29)	10 (4)	3
54	DF	BRA	Kawan	10 April 2003 (aged 22)	3	0
71	FW	ARG	Rafael Monti	8 December 1999 (aged 26)	4 (3)	0
77	MF	GRE	Panagiotis Tachtsidis	15 February 1991 (aged 35)	4 (2)	1

=== Top scorers ===
As of 22 November 2026

Place	Position	Name	Campeonato Brasileiro Série A	Campeonato Paraense	Copa do Brasil	Copa Norte	Super Copa Grão-Pará	Total
1	FW	Jajá	10	0	0	0	0	10
2	FW	Yago Pikachu	3	2	1	0	1	7
3	FW	Alef Manga	5	0	1	0	0	6
4	FW	Gabriel Taliari	4	0	0	1	0	5
5	MF	Vitor Bueno	4	0	0	0	0	4
5	MF	Leonel Picco	3	0	1	0	0	4
7	FW	João Pedro	1	2	0	0	0	3
7	FW	Eduardo Melo	0	2	0	0	1	3
9	DF	Marcelinho	2	0	0	0	0	2
9	DF	Marllon	2	0	0	0	0	2
9	MF	David Braga	2	0	0	0	0	2
9	MF	Patrick	1	0	1	0	0	2
9	MF	Patrick de Paula	0	1	0	1	0	2
9	MF	Giovanni Pavani	0	2	0	0	0	2
9	FW	Nicolás Ferreira	0	2	0	0	0	2
16	DF	Duplexe Tchamba	0	0	1	0	0	1
16	MF	Zé Ricardo	1	0	0	0	0	1
16	MF	Zé Welison	1	0	0	0	0	1
16	FW	Antonio Galeano	1	0	0	0	0	1
16	DF	Braian Cufré	0	0	0	1	0	1
16	MF	Panagiotis Tachtsidis	0	0	0	1	0	1
16	MF	Franco Catarozzi	0	0	0	1	0	1
16	FW	Gabriel Poveda	0	0	0	1	0	1
16	DF	Thalisson	0	1	0	0	0	1
16	FW	Carlinhos	0	1	0	0	0	1
Own goals			1	1	0	0	0	2

=== Disciplinary record ===
As of 22 November 2026

Position	Name	Campeonato Brasileiro Série A		Campeonato Paraense		Copa do Brasil		Copa Norte		Super Copa Grão-Pará		Total	
Position	Name	Yellow card	Red card	Yellow card	Red card	Yellow card	Red card	Yellow card	Red card	Yellow card	Red card	Yellow card	Red card
FW	Gabriel Poveda	2	1	0	0	0	0	2	1	0	0	4	2
MF	Zé Ricardo	5	1	2	0	1	0	1	0	0	0	9	1
DF	Marllon	6	0	2	0	0	1	0	0	0	0	8	1
FW	Yago Pikachu	4	1	1	0	0	0	0	0	1	0	6	1
FW	Jajá	3	1	0	0	1	0	0	0	0	0	4	1
FW	Diego Hernández	1	0	0	1	0	0	1	0	0	0	2	1
MF	Edson Fernando	2	1	0	0	1	0	0	0	0	0	3	1
MF	Zé Welison	7	0	1	0	0	0	0	0	0	0	8	0
DF	Zé Ivaldo	7	0	0	0	0	0	0	0	0	0	7	0
DF	Marcelinho	5	0	0	0	0	0	0	0	0	0	5	0
MF	Patrick de Paula	4	0	1	0	0	0	0	0	0	0	5	0
GK	Marcelo Rangel	3	0	0	0	1	0	0	0	0	0	4	0
DF	Matheus Felipe	3	0	0	0	1	0	0	0	0	0	4	0
DF	Kayky Almeida	1	0	2	0	0	0	1	0	0	0	4	0
DF	Léo Andrade	1	0	1	0	0	0	1	0	1	0	4	0
MF	Vitor Bueno	2	0	2	0	0	0	0	0	0	0	4	0
FW	Gabriel Taliari	4	0	0	0	0	0	0	0	0	0	4	0
MF	Leonel Picco	3	0	0	0	1	0	0	0	0	0	4	0
FW	Antonio Galeano	3	0	0	0	0	0	0	0	0	0	3	0
DF	João Lucas	3	0	0	0	0	0	0	0	0	0	3	0
DF	Matheus Alexandre	1	0	0	0	0	0	1	0	0	0	2	0
DF	Cristian Tassano	0	0	1	0	0	0	1	0	0	0	2	0
MF	Franco Catarozzi	0	0	2	0	0	0	0	0	0	0	2	0
MF	Freitas	0	0	2	0	0	0	0	0	0	0	2	0
MF	David Braga	2	0	0	0	0	0	0	0	0	0	2	0
FW	Alef Manga	1	0	0	0	1	0	0	0	0	0	2	0
FW	Carlinhos	1	0	1	0	0	0	0	0	0	0	2	0
DF	Duplexe Tchamba	2	0	0	0	0	0	0	0	0	0	2	0
DF	Marlon	1	0	0	0	0	0	0	0	0	0	1	0
DF	Braian Cufré	0	0	0	0	0	0	1	0	0	0	1	0
DF	William Klaus	0	0	1	0	0	0	0	0	0	0	1	0
MF	Patrick	1	0	0	0	0	0	0	0	0	0	1	0
MF	Giovanni Pavani	0	0	0	0	0	0	1	0	0	0	1	0
MF	Dodô	1	0	0	0	0	0	0	0	0	0	1	0
FW	João Pedro	1	0	0	0	0	0	0	0	0	0	1	0
FW	Eduardo Melo	0	0	1	0	0	0	0	0	0	0	1	0
FW	Rafael Monti	0	0	0	0	0	0	1	0	0	0	1	0
FW	Andrés González	0	0	0	0	0	0	1	0	0	0	1	0
GK	Ygor Vinhas	0	0	1	0	0	0	0	0	0	0	1	0
	TOTALS	80	5	21	1	7	1	12	1	2	0	122	8

== Kit ==
Supplier: Volt Sport / Main sponsor: Banpará, Vaidebet

Home	Home alt. 1	Home alt. 2	Away	Away alt. 1	Third

== New contracts and transfers ==
=== New contracts ===
Position	Name	Type	Source
MF	Pedro Castro	Contract extension	
DF	Marcelinho	Contract extension	
GK	Ygor Vinhas	Contract extension	
GK	Marcelo Rangel	Contract extension	
DF	William Klaus	Contract extension	
MF	Giovanni Pavani	Contract extension	
DF	Kayky Almeida	Loan extension	
DF	Kawan	Loan extension	
MF	Freitas	Loan extension	
DF	Sávio	Contract extension	

=== Transfers in ===
Position	Name	From	Type	Source
FW	Alef Manga	(Brazil) Avaí	Transfer	
MF	Zé Ricardo	(Japan) Kawasaki Frontale	Transfer	
FW	Yago Pikachu	(Brazil) Fortaleza	Transfer	
FW	Carlinhos	(Brazil) Flamengo	Loan	
MF	Patrick de Paula	(Brazil) Botafogo	Loan	
DF	Léo Andrade	(South Korea) Suwon Samsung Bluewings	Transfer	
DF	João Lucas	(Brazil) Grêmio	Loan	
DF	Thalisson	(Brazil) Coritiba	Loan	
DF	Marllon	(Brazil) Ceará	Transfer	
MF	Patrick	(Brazil) Santos	Loan	
FW	Rafael Monti	Vinotinto Ecuador	Loan	
MF	Zé Welison	(Brazil) Fortaleza	Transfer	
DF	Braian Cufré	(Argentina) Central Córdoba	Transfer	
MF	Vitor Bueno	(Japan) Cerezo Osaka	Transfer	
GK	Ivan	(Brazil) Internacional	Transfer	
MF	Franco Catarozzi	(Uruguay) Liverpool	Transfer	
MF	Leonel Picco	(Argentina) Platense	Transfer	
FW	Jajá	(Brazil) Goiás	Transfer	
DF	Duplexe Tchamba	(Portugal) Casa Pia	Transfer	
FW	Gabriel Poveda	(Brazil) Primavera	Loan	
FW	Gabriel Taliari	(Brazil) Juventude	Transfer	
DF	Matheus Alexandre	(Brazil) Sport	Loan	
MF	David Braga	(Brazil) Athletic	Transfer	
DF	Mayk	(Brazil) Grêmio	Transfer	
MF	Edson Fernando	(Ukraine) Karpaty Lviv	Loan	
DF	Matheus Felipe	(Vietnam) Cong An Ho Chi Minh City	Transfer	
DF	Zé Ivaldo	(Brazil) Santos	Loan	
FW	Antonio Galeano	(Brazil) Mirassol	Transfer	
DF	Marlon	(Brazil) Cuiabá	Transfer	

=== Transfers out ===
Position	Name	To	Type	Source
DF	Iván Alvariño	(Brazil) Novorizontino	Loan	
MF	Pedro Castro	(Brazil) CRB	Transfer	
MF	Caio Vinícius	(China) Yunnan Yukun	Transfer	
MF	Dodô	(Brazil) Vila Nova	Loan	
DF	Jorge	Free agent	Contract termination	
MF	Yago Ferreira	(Brazil) Fluminense	Loan return	
FW	Marrony	(Brazil) Atlético Goianiense	Loan	
DF	Kawan	(Brazil) Botafogo	Loan return	
DF	Sávio	(Brazil) Ceará	Contract termination	
MF	Guty	(Brazil) Brasil de Pelotas	Loan	
DF	William Klaus	(Brazil) Operário Ferroviário	Transfer	
MF	Víctor Cantillo	(Colombia) Atlético Bucaramanga	Contract termination	
FW	Nicolás Ferreira	(Uruguay) Montevideo Wanderers	Loan return	
MF	Panagiotis Tachtsidis	(Cyprus) Karmiotissa	Contract termination	
MF	Patrick de Paula	(Brazil) Botafogo	Loan return	
FW	Diego Hernández	(Brazil) Botafogo	Loan return	
FW	João Pedro	(Brazil) Atlético Goianiense	Contract termination	
MF	Freitas	(Brazil) Fluminense	Loan return	
FW	Carlinhos	(Brazil) Flamengo	Loan return	
DF	Kayky Almeida	(Brazil) Fluminense	Loan return	
MF	Giovanni Pavani	(Brazil) Ceará	Transfer	
DF	Thalisson	(Brazil) Coritiba	Loan return	
DF	Braian Cufré	(Argentina) Aldosivi	Transfer	
FW	Rafael Monti	Vinotinto Ecuador	Loan return	
FW	Alef Manga	Free agent	Contract termination	
DF	Cristian Tassano	Free agent	Contract termination	
MF	Franco Catarozzi	Free agent	Contract termination	

Notes

1. Following Panagiotis Tachtsidis' release on 4 June, he later signed for Karmiotissa.
2. Following Sávio's release on 27 March, he later signed for Ceará.
3. Following Víctor Cantillo's release on 7 April, he later signed for Atlético Bucaramanga.

== Competitions ==
Competition	First match	Last match	Starting round	Final position	Record							
Competition	First match	Last match	Starting round	Final position	Pld	W	D	L	GF	GA	GD	Win %
Campeonato Brasileiro Série A	28 January 2026	2 December 2026	Matchday 1	TBD	36	7	11	18	41	61	−20	19.44
Campeonato Paraense	24 January 2026	8 March 2026	League phase	2nd	10	3	6	1	14	10	+4	30.00
Copa do Brasil	22 April 2026	4 August 2026	Fifth round	Round of 16	4	2	1	1	5	3	+2	50.00
Copa Norte	26 March 2026	29 April 2026	Group stage	Group stage	5	2	1	2	6	6	+0	40.00
Super Copa Grão-Pará	18 January 2026		Final	Winners	1	1	0	0	2	1	+1	100.00
Total					56	15	19	22	68	81	−13	26.79

Source: Competitions

=== Campeonato Brasileiro Série A ===
Win Draw Loss

==== League table ====
Pos	Team	Pld	W	D	L	GF	GA	GD	Pts	Qualification or relegation
16	Corinthians	35	10	10	15	40	42	−2	40	
17	Internacional	35	9	11	15	39	44	−5	38	Relegation to Campeonato Brasileiro Série B
18	Grêmio (Note: Grêmio qualified for the Copa Libertadores group stage as 2026 Copa do Brasil champions or runners-up. If they are relegated, their berth will be passed to the Série A's highest-placed team not already qualified.)	35	9	11	15	38	47	−9	38	Relegation to Campeonato Brasileiro Série B
19	Remo (R)	36	7	11	18	41	61	−20	32	Relegation to Campeonato Brasileiro Série B
20	Chapecoense (R)	36	4	9	23	34	74	−40	21	Relegation to Campeonato Brasileiro Série B

Updated to match(es) played on 22 November 2026 (2 of 3 matches finished). Source: CBF
Rules for classification: 1) points; 2) wins; 3) goal difference; 4) goals scored; 5) head-to-head results (only between two teams); 6) fewest red cards; 7) fewest yellow cards; 8) drawing of lots.
(R) Relegated

==== Results by round ====
Round	1	2	3	4	5	6	7	8	9	10	11	12	13	14	15	16	17	18	19	20	21	22	23	24	25	26	27	28	29	30	31	32	33	34	35	36	37	38
Ground	A	H	A	H	H	A	A	H	A	A	H	A	H	A	H	A	H	H	A	H	A	H	A	A	H	H	A	H	H	A	H	A	H	A	H	A	A	H
Result	L	D	D	D	L	L	L	W	L	D	D	L	L	W	D	W	L	W	L	W	L	D	D	L	L	L	L	L	D	D	D	L	W	L	W	L		
Position	19	19	16	16	18	18	20	19	20	18	18	19	19	19	19	18	19	18	19	18	19	19	19	19	19	19	19	19	19	19	19	19	19	19	19	19	19	
Points	0	1	2	3	3	3	3	6	6	7	8	8	8	11	12	15	15	18	18	21	21	22	23	23	23	23	23	23	24	25	26	26	29	29	32	32		

Updated to match(es) played on 22 November 2026. Source:
A = Away; H = Home; W = Win; D = Draw; L = Loss

==== Matches ====
28 January 2026 1	Vitória	2–0	Remo	Salvador
19:00 UTC−3	Baralhas (yellow card) 27', (goal) 76'; Ramon (yellow card) 37'; Renato Kayzer 57'	Report	Zé Ricardo (yellow card) 14'; Patrick de Paula (yellow card) 42'; Dodô (yellow card) 76'; Léo Andrade (yellow card) 90+4'	Stadium: Barradão; Attendance: 16,511; Referee: Ramon Abatti

4 February 2026 2	Remo	2–2	Mirassol	Belém
20:00 UTC−3	João Pedro 8'; Hernández (yellow card) 34'; Alef Manga 39'; João Lucas (yellow card) 71'	Report	Negueba (yellow card) 44'; José Aldo (yellow card) 71'; Igor Formiga 80'; Nathan Fogaça 88'	Stadium: Mangueirão; Attendance: 21,118; Referee: Alex Gomes Stefano

11 February 2026 3	Atlético Mineiro	3–3	Remo	Belo Horizonte
20:00 UTC−3	Hulk 21'; Ruan 69'; Dudu 90+7'	Report	Vitor Bueno 42'; João Pedro (yellow card) 57'; Kayky Almeida (yellow card) 68'; Yago Pikachu 86'; Alef Manga 90+1'	Stadium: Arena MRV; Attendance: 16,056; Referee: Matheus Delgado Candançan

25 February 2026 4	Remo	1–1	Internacional	Belém
19:00 UTC−3	Picco 13', (yellow card) 30'; Patrick de Paula (yellow card) 61'; Zé Welison (yellow card) 69'; Carlinhos (yellow card) 75'; João Lucas (yellow card) 90+4'	Report	Alan Patrick 4'; Mercado (yellow card) 79'	Stadium: Mangueirão; Attendance: 21,687; Referee: Bruno Arleu de Araújo

12 March 2026 5	Remo	0–2	Fluminense	Belém
19:00 UTC−3	João Pedro (yellow card) 36'; Patrick de Paula (yellow card) 76'	Report	John Kennedy 15'; Hércules (yellow card) 52'; Canobbio 62'	Stadium: Mangueirão; Attendance: 26,528; Referee: Wilton Sampaio

15 March 2026 6	Coritiba	1–0	Remo	Curitiba
18:30 UTC−3	Pedro Rocha 24'; Gómez (yellow card) 45+3'; Lucas Ronier (yellow card) 90+4'	Report	João Lucas (yellow card) 32'; Marllon (yellow card) 70'; Jajá (yellow card) 79'	Stadium: Estádio Couto Pereira; Attendance: 28,300; Referee: Rafael Rodrigo Klein

19 March 2026 7	Flamengo	3–0	Remo	Rio de Janeiro
20:00 UTC−3	Ortiz 19'; Pulgar (yellow card) 25'; Lino 47'; Luiz Araújo 53'; Léo Pereira (yellow card) 61'	Report	Patrick de Paula (yellow card) 21'; Zé Welison (yellow card) 90+2'	Stadium: Maracanã; Attendance: 62,075; Referee: Paulo César Zanovelli da Silva

22 March 2026 8	Remo	4–1	Bahia	Belém
16:00 UTC−3	Zé Ricardo (yellow card) 13'; Vitor Bueno 45+8'; Taliari 49', 58'; Marllon (yellow card) 62'; Marcelo Rangel (yellow card) 82'; Jajá 83'	Report	Everaldo 32'; Rodrigo Nestor (yellow card) 90+4'	Stadium: Mangueirão; Attendance: 22,447; Referee: João Vitor Gobi

2 April 2026 9	Santos	2–0	Remo	Santos
19:00 UTC−3	Thaciano 39', (yellow card) 40'; Gustavo Henrique (yellow card) 57'; Rony (yellow card) 70'; Moisés 81'; Neymar (yellow card) 86'	Report	Zé Ricardo (yellow card) 4'; Zé Welison (yellow card) 55'	Stadium: Vila Belmiro; Attendance: 12,242; Referee: Sávio Pereira Sampaio

5 April 2026 10	Grêmio	0–0	Remo	Porto Alegre
20:30 UTC−3	Arthur (yellow card) 40'; Pavon (yellow card) 42'	Report	David Braga (yellow card) 43'; Yago Pikachu (yellow card) 43' (yellow-red card) 67'	Stadium: Arena do Grêmio; Attendance: 23,251; Referee: Edina Alves Batista

11 April 2026 11	Remo	1–1	Vasco da Gama	Belém
17:00 UTC−3	Marllon 83'	Report	Cuiabano (yellow card) 11'; Gómez 54'; Saldivia (yellow card) 82'	Stadium: Mangueirão; Attendance: 35,305; Referee: Rodrigo José Pereira de Lima

19 April 2026 12	Red Bull Bragantino	4–2	Remo	Bragança Paulista
18:30 UTC−3	Pitta 19', 37'; Alix Vinicius (yellow card) 42'; Tchamba 47', 51' (o.g.)	Report	Taliari 27'; Marcelinho 38'; Alef Manga (yellow card) 87'	Stadium: Estádio Cícero de Souza Marques; Attendance: 4,163; Referee: Jonathan Benkenstein Pinheiro

25 April 2026 13	Remo	0–1	Cruzeiro	Belém
18:30 UTC−3	Zé Ricardo (yellow card) 43'	Report	Arroyo 33', (yellow card) 38'; Matheus Cunha (yellow card) 53'; Kauã Moraes (yellow card) 59'	Stadium: Baenão; Attendance: 12,993; Referee: Wilton Sampaio

2 May 2026 14	Botafogo	1–2	Remo	Rio de Janeiro
16:00 UTC−3	Ferraresi 13'; Vitinho (yellow card) 37'; Danilo (yellow card) 48'	Report	Tchamba (yellow card) 44'; Alef Manga 69'; Picco (yellow card) 87'; Jajá 90+1'	Stadium: Estádio Olímpico Nilton Santos; Attendance: 22,116; Referee: Rodrigo José Pereira de Lima

10 May 2026 15	Remo	1–1	Palmeiras	Belém
17:40 UTC−3	Alef Manga 1'; Zé Ricardo (red card) 72'; Marcelo Rangel (yellow card) 90+3'	Report	Jefté (yellow card) 4'; Sosa 23'; Allan (yellow card) 31'	Stadium: Mangueirão; Attendance: 40,629; Referee: Rafael Rodrigo Klein

17 May 2026 16	Chapecoense	2–3	Remo	Chapecó
18:30 UTC−3	Neto Pessoa 24'; Carvalheira 46'; Camilo (yellow card) 64'; João Paulo (yellow card) 90+1'	Report	Yago Pikachu 16'; Jajá 50'; Marcelinho (yellow card) 69'; Bruno Leonardo 86' (o.g.)	Stadium: Arena Condá; Attendance: 9,202; Referee: Alex Gomes Stefano

24 May 2026 17	Remo	1–2	Athletico Paranaense	Belém
16:00 UTC−3	Jajá 13', (red card) 45+7'; Marcelinho (yellow card) 90+10'	Report	Viveros 45', 52'; Zapelli (yellow card) 45+9'; Felipinho (yellow card) 64'; Leozinho (yellow card) 89'; Riquelme (yellow card) 90+2'	Stadium: Mangueirão; Attendance: 25,290; Referee: Rodrigo José Pereira de Lima

31 May 2026 18	Remo	1–0	São Paulo	Belém
20:30 UTC−3	David Braga (yellow card) 84'; Marcelinho 90+3'	Report	Osorio (yellow card) 27'; Díaz (yellow card) 37'	Stadium: Mangueirão; Attendance: 25,649; Referee: Jonathan Benkenstein Pinheiro

23 July 2026 19	Corinthians	3–0	Remo	São Paulo
19:30 UTC−3	Yuri Alberto 26', 45+1'; Kaio César 39'; Gabriel Paulista (yellow card) 85'	Report	Marllon (yellow card) 85'	Stadium: Neo Química Arena; Attendance: 43,623; Referee: Lucas Casagrande

26 July 2026 20	Remo	2–0	Vitória	Belém
19:30 UTC−3	Zé Ivaldo (yellow card) 3'; Jajá 38'; Matheus Felipe (yellow card) 42'; Yago Pikachu (yellow card) 52'; Alef Manga 54'	Report	Cacá (yellow card) 40'	Stadium: Mangueirão; Attendance: 13,541; Referee: Flávio Rodrigues de Souza

29 July 2026 21	Mirassol	2–1	Remo	Mirassol
19:30 UTC−3	Igor Formiga (yellow card) 16'; Gabriel (yellow card) 20'; Marllon 30' (o.g.); João Victor 53'	Report	Picco 45'; Matheus Alexandre (yellow card) 71'; Zé Ivaldo (yellow card) 72'	Stadium: Estádio José Maria de Campos Maia; Attendance: 4,519; Referee: Lucas Paulo Torezin

8 August 2026 22	Remo	2–2	Atlético Mineiro	Belém
18:30 UTC−3	Jajá 3'; Taliari 73'; Zé Welison (yellow card) 85'; Matheus Felipe (yellow card) 90+6'	Report	Reinier 34'; Bernard 38'; Franco (yellow card) 77'; Victor Hugo (yellow card) 88'	Stadium: Mangueirão; Attendance: 15,235; Referee: Ramon Abatti

17 August 2026 23	Internacional	1–1	Remo	Porto Alegre
20:00 UTC−3	Carbonero 3'; Matheus Bahia (yellow card) 82'	Report	Marlon (yellow card) 49'; Jajá (yellow card) 57'; Zé Ricardo (yellow card) 65'; Vitor Bueno 90+4', (yellow card) 90+4'	Stadium: Estádio Beira-Rio; Attendance: 31,596; Referee: Edina Alves Batista

22 August 2026 24	Fluminense	2–1	Remo	Rio de Janeiro
16:00 UTC−3	Hércules (yellow card) 3'; Hulk 66'; Serna 82'	Report	Jajá 31'; Yago Pikachu (yellow card) 80'	Stadium: Maracanã; Attendance: 30,215; Referee: João Vitor Gobi

31 August 2026 25	Remo	2–3	Coritiba	Belém
20:00 UTC−3	Zé Ricardo 60'; Yago Pikachu 64'; Taliari (yellow card) 65'; Zé Welison (yellow card) 77'; Marllon (yellow card) 90+1'	Report	Zé Welison 47' (o.g.); Tiago Cóser (yellow card) 55'; Fabinho 76'; Pedro Rocha 90+2'	Stadium: Mangueirão; Attendance: 30,791; Referee: Daiane Muniz

6 September 2026 26	Remo	0–1	Flamengo	Belém
16:00 UTC−3	Galeano (yellow card) 38'; Marcelinho (yellow card) 75'; Edson Fernando (red card) 90+5'	Report	De Arrascaeta (yellow card) 40'; Carrascal (yellow card) 47'; Lino 64'	Stadium: Mangueirão; Attendance: 51,567; Referee: Lucas Casagrande

14 September 2026 27	Bahia	2–1	Remo	Salvador
20:00 UTC−3	Acevedo (yellow card) 7'; Jean Lucas 20'; Luciano Juba 90+1' (pen.); Olivera (yellow card) 90+5'	Report	Matheus Felipe (yellow card) 69'; Vitor Bueno 90+6' (pen.)	Stadium: Arena Fonte Nova; Attendance: 34,232; Referee: Rodrigo José Pereira de Lima

19 September 2026 28	Remo	1–2	Santos	Belém
18:30 UTC−3	Zé Welison (yellow card) 53'; Marllon 82'; Poveda (yellow card) 84' (yellow-red card) 90+2'	Report	Escobar (yellow card) 18'; Gabriel Barbosa (yellow card) 72', (goal) 87'; Rony 78'; Luan Peres (yellow card) 90+2'; Bontempo (yellow card) 90+3'	Stadium: Mangueirão; Attendance: 23,760; Referee: Wilton Sampaio

7 October 2026 29	Remo	1–1	Grêmio	Belém
19:30 UTC−3	Vitor Bueno (yellow card) 10'; Taliari (yellow card) 35'; Galeano (yellow card) 45+1'; David Braga 87'	Report	Pavon (yellow card) 19'; Dodi (yellow card) 26'; Kannemann 45+3'; Enamorado (yellow card) 56'; João Pedro (yellow card) 81'	Stadium: Mangueirão; Attendance: 17,944; Referee: Davi de Oliveira Lacerda

10 October 2026 30	Vasco da Gama	0–0	Remo	Rio de Janeiro
18:00 UTC−3	Saldivia (yellow card) 48'; Jair (yellow card) 74'	Report	Zé Ivaldo (yellow card) 19'; Marcelo Rangel (yellow card) 90+3'	Stadium: Estádio São Januário; Attendance: 19,866; Referee: Paulo César Zanovelli da Silva

18 October 2026 31	Remo	1–1	Red Bull Bragantino	Belém
19:30 UTC−3	Zé Ivaldo (yellow card) 48'; Jajá 54'; Taliari (yellow card) 79'	Report	Lucas Barbosa 9'; Eric Ramires (yellow card) 63'	Stadium: Mangueirão; Attendance: 13,089; Referee: Alex Gomes Stefano

23 October 2026 32	Cruzeiro	1–0	Remo	Belo Horizonte
20:00 UTC−3	Fabrício Bruno 45+4'	Report	Patrick (yellow card) 50'; Zé Ivaldo (yellow card) 78'; Marcelinho (yellow card) 90+3'	Stadium: Mineirão; Attendance: 29,516; Referee: Bruno Arleu de Araújo

28 October 2026 33	Remo	2–1	Botafogo	Belém
21:30 UTC−3	Jajá 8'; Picco 54'	Report	Domingos Andrade (yellow card) 55'; Edenilson 82'	Stadium: Mangueirão; Attendance: 13,458; Referee: Lucas Paulo Torezin

5 November 2026 34	Palmeiras	6–1	Remo	São Paulo
19:30 UTC−3	Arias 4', 13'; Maurício 21'; Marcelinho 37' (o.g.); López 54'; Felipe Anderson 79'	Report	Zé Welison 45+1'; Marllon (yellow card) 52'; Zé Ivaldo (yellow card) 59'; Marcelinho (yellow card) 66'; Edson Fernando (yellow card) 85'	Stadium: Nubank Parque; Attendance: 33,520; Referee: Wilton Sampaio

18 November 2026 35	Remo	2–0	Chapecoense	Belém
20:00 UTC−3	Jajá 2'; Patrick 20' (pen.); Picco (yellow card) 44'; Galeano (yellow card) 67'; Taliari (yellow card) 78'	Report	Giovanni Augusto (yellow card) 43'; David Antunes (yellow card) 47'; Doma (yellow card) 90+2'	Stadium: Mangueirão; Attendance: 13,973; Referee: Alex Gomes Stefano

22 November 2026 36	Athletico Paranaense	4–2	Remo	Curitiba
16:00 UTC−3	Mendoza 8', (yellow card) 49'; Vargas 31'; Dantas (yellow card) 60'; Esquivel (yellow card) 63'; Leozinho 67'; Rivaldo 84'	Report	Zé Welison (yellow card) 24'; Edson Fernando (yellow card) 33'; Zé Ivaldo (yellow card) 34'; Marllon (yellow card) 55'; Tchamba (yellow card) 58'; David Braga 61'; Jajá (yellow card) 65'; Galeano 90'	Stadium: Arena da Baixada; Referee: Wilton Sampaio

26 November 2026 37	São Paulo	v	Remo	São Paulo
20:00 UTC−3				Stadium: Estádio do Morumbi

2 December 2026 38	Remo	v	Corinthians	Belém
21:30 UTC−3				Stadium: Mangueirão

=== Campeonato Paraense ===
Win Draw Loss

==== League phase ====
Pos	Team	Pld	W	D	L	GF	GA	GD	Pts	Qualification or relegation
3	Paysandu (A)	6	3	1	2	6	4	+2	10	Advance to the Final stage
4	Águia de Marabá (A)	6	3	1	2	8	7	+1	10	Advance to the Final stage
5	Remo (A)	6	2	4	0	9	5	+4	10	Advance to the Final stage
6	Tuna Luso (A)	6	3	0	3	3	5	−2	9	Advance to the Final stage
7	Castanhal (A)	6	2	2	2	4	5	−1	8	Advance to the Final stage

Updated to match(es) played on 15 February 2026. Source: Globo Esporte
Rules for classification: 1) points; 2) wins; 3) goal difference; 4) goals scored; 5) fewest red cards; 6) fewest yellow cards; 7) drawing of lots.
(A) Advance to a further round

===== Matches =====
24 January 2026 1	Remo	2–1	Bragantino	Belém
16:00 UTC−3	Ygor Vinhas (yellow card) 45+7'; Eduardo Melo 50'; Yago Pikachu 64'	Report	Wander 23'; Matheus (yellow card) 72'	Stadium: Mangueirão; Attendance: 11,021; Referee: Marco José Soares de Almeida

31 January 2026 2	São Francisco	0–0	Remo	Belterra
16:00 UTC−3	Marquinho Capanema (red card) 18'; Barbosa (yellow card) 52'	Report	Tassano (yellow card) 90+4'	Stadium: Estádio Municipal de Belterra; Attendance: 1,500; Referee: Fernando Antônio Mendes de Salles Nascimento Filho

5 February 2026 3	Remo	3–0	Águia de Marabá	Belém
20:00 UTC−3	Pavani 39'; Ferreira 45+2', 63'; Kayky Almeida (yellow card) 61'	Report	Bruno Limão (yellow card) 45+3'	Stadium: Baenão; Attendance: 7,417; Referee: Dewson Fernando Freitas da Silva

8 February 2026 4	Paysandu	1–1	Remo	Belém
17:00 UTC−3	Ítalo 36'; Brian (red card) 45'; Quintana (yellow card) 45+1'; Thalyson (yellow card) 45+1'	Report	Eduardo Melo (yellow card) 36'; Yago Pikachu (yellow card) 45+1'; Quintana 58' (o.g.); Zé Welison (yellow card) 67'; Catarozzi (yellow card) 90+2'; Hernández (red card) 90+5'	Stadium: Mangueirão; Attendance: 42,154; Referee: Rodrigo José Pereira de Lima

12 February 2026 5	Castanhal	2–2	Remo	Castanhal
19:30 UTC−3	Daniel GTA 36'; Tom (yellow card) 48'; Romarinho (yellow card) 58'; Ricardinho 68'	Report	Eduardo Melo 61' (pen.); Freitas (yellow card) 88'; Thalisson 90+3'	Stadium: Estádio Maximino Porpino Filho; Attendance: 4,915; Referee: Alexandre Expedito Vieira da Silva Júnior

15 February 2026 6	Remo	1–1	Amazônia Independente	Belém
15:30 UTC−3	Klaus (yellow card) 45+4'; Freitas (yellow card) 65'; Catarozzi (yellow card) 82'; Pavani 89'	Report	Juninho 14' (pen.); Eduardo (yellow card) 45+1'; Paulo (yellow card) 59'; Perema (yellow card) 90+1'	Stadium: Baenão; Attendance: 11,800; Referee: Fernando Antônio Mendes de Salles Nascimento Filho

==== Final stage ====
===== Quarter-finals =====
18 February 2026	Águia de Marabá	1–1 (4–5 p)	Remo	Marabá
20:00 UTC−3	Gustavo Vintecinco 10'	Report	Yago Pikachu 63' (pen.); Kayky Almeida (yellow card) 90+5'	Stadium: Estádio Municipal Zinho de Oliveira; Attendance: 3,718; Referee: Marco José Soares de Almeida
	Penalties
	Bruno Limão (penalty scored); Diogo Carlos (penalty scored); Wendel (penalty missed); Tiago Bagagem (penalty scored); Cássio (penalty scored)		(penalty scored) João Pedro; (penalty scored) Vitor Bueno; (penalty scored) Yago Pikachu; (penalty scored) Patrick de Paula; (penalty scored) Alef Manga

===== Semi-finals =====
22 February 2026	Cametá	2–3	Remo	Cametá
17:00 UTC−3	Kayky Almeida 45+5' (o.g.); Tauã 52', (yellow card) 53'; Elyvelton (yellow card) 71'	Report	Marllon (yellow card) 15'; Carlinhos 67', (yellow card) 90+3'; João Pedro 90'; Vitor Bueno (yellow card) 90+1'; Patrick de Paula 90+5', (yellow card) 90+5'	Stadium: Estádio Parque do Bacurau; Attendance: 4,995; Referee: Joelson Nazareno Ferreira Cardoso

===== Finals =====
1 March 2026 First leg	Remo	1–2	Paysandu	Belém
17:00 UTC−3	Léo Andrade (yellow card) 45+4'; Zé Ricardo (yellow card) 51'; João Pedro 75' (pen.); Vitor Bueno (yellow card) 88'	Report	Caio Mello 6'; Thayllon (yellow card) 19'; Marcinho 32', (yellow card) 53'	Stadium: Mangueirão; Attendance: 24,816; Referee: Ramon Abatti

8 March 2026 Second leg	Paysandu	0–0 (2–1 agg.)	Remo	Belém
17:00 UTC−3	Marcinho (yellow card) 79'; Pedro Henrique (yellow card) 88'	Report	Marllon (yellow card) 85'; Zé Ricardo (yellow card) 90+3'	Stadium: Mangueirão; Attendance: 46,809; Referee: Wagner do Nascimento Magalhães

=== Copa do Brasil ===
Win Draw Loss

As a Série A side, Remo entered the Copa do Brasil in the fifth round.

==== Fifth round ====
22 April 2026 First leg	Bahia	1–3	Remo	Salvador
19:00 UTC−3	Luciano Juba (yellow card) 15'; Willian José 22'; Caio Alexandre (yellow card) 51'	Report	Tchamba 17'; Yago Pikachu 74' (pen.); Alef Manga 90+5'	Stadium: Arena Fonte Nova; Attendance: 31,056; Referee: Alex Gomes Stefano

13 May 2026 Second leg	Remo	2–1 (5–2 agg.)	Bahia	Belém
21:30 UTC−3	Patrick 35'; Jajá (yellow card) 39'; Marcelo Rangel (yellow card) 81'; Picco 90+2'	Report	Erick 22'; Jean Lucas (yellow card) 36'; Marcos Victor (yellow card) 46'; Olivera (yellow card) 56'; Luciano Juba (yellow card) 85'	Stadium: Mangueirão; Attendance: 22,461; Referee: Flávio Rodrigues de Souza

==== Round of 16 ====
1 August 2026 First leg	Santos	0–0	Remo	Santos
21:00 UTC−3	Rollheiser (yellow card) 18'; Escobar (yellow card) 53'; Neymar (yellow card) 90+4'	Report	Zé Ricardo (yellow card) 39'; Matheus Felipe (yellow card) 45+3'; Alef Manga (yellow card) 73'; Edson Fernando (yellow card) 87'	Stadium: Vila Belmiro; Attendance: 12,820; Referee: Bruno Arleu de Araújo

4 August 2026 Second leg	Remo	0–1 (0–1 agg.)	Santos	Belém
21:30 UTC−3	Marllon (red card) 27'; Picco (yellow card) 45+6'	Report	Gabriel Barbosa (yellow card) 21'; João Schmidt (yellow card) 23'; Rony 73'; Oliva (yellow card) 82'; Gabriel Menino (yellow card) 90+1'; Barreal (yellow card) 90+3'	Stadium: Mangueirão; Attendance: 43,658; Referee: Anderson Daronco

=== Copa Norte ===
Win Draw Loss

==== Group stage ====
Pos	Team	Pld	W	D	L	GF	GA	GD	Pts	Qualification
1	(Pará) Águia de Marabá (A)	5	4	1	0	12	6	+6	13	Advance to Knockout stage
2	(Rondônia) Porto Velho (A)	5	3	1	1	10	5	+5	10	Advance to Knockout stage
3	(Amazonas (Brazilian state)) Amazonas	5	2	1	2	9	6	+3	7	
4	(Pará) Remo	5	2	1	2	6	6	0	7	
5	(Acre (state)) Galvez	5	1	0	4	9	17	−8	3	
6	Monte Roraima	5	0	2	3	9	15	−6	2	

Updated to match(es) played on 29 April 2026. Source: CBF
Rules for classification: 1) points; 2) wins; 3) goal difference; 4) goals scored; 5) fewest red cards; 6) fewest yellow cards; 7) drawing of lots.
(A) Advance to a further round

===== Matches =====
26 March 2026 1	Porto Velho	2–1	Remo	Porto Velho
20:30 UTC−3	Lagoa (yellow card) 8'; Tcharlles 25'; Luan Viana 88' (pen.), (yellow card) 89'; Emerson Bacas (yellow card) 90+5'; Gabriel Davis (yellow card) 90+6'	Report	Léo Andrade (yellow card) 19'; Cufré 57'; Monti (yellow card) 90+1'; Pavani (yellow card) 90+2'; González (yellow card) 90+9'	Stadium: Aluizão; Attendance: 2,432; Referee: Jackson Rodrigues da Silva

29 March 2026 2	Remo	1–1	Monte Roraima	Belém
17:00 UTC−3	Zé Ricardo (yellow card) 44'; Kayky Almeida (yellow card) 51'; Taliari 69'	Report	Eydison (yellow card) 35'; Luisinho (yellow card) 42'; Nalberth 78'; André Junio (yellow card) 90+2'; Bruno Costa (yellow card) 90+3'	Stadium: Baenão; Attendance: 8,402; Referee: Ivan da Silva Guimarães Júnior

8 April 2026 3	Remo	1–0	Amazonas	Belém
20:00 UTC−3	Hernández (yellow card) 40'; Poveda 43'	Report	Diego Ivo (yellow card) 23'; Kauan Firmo (yellow card) 70'; Marcondes (yellow card) 89'	Stadium: Mangueirão; Attendance: 8,525; Referee: Anderson Ribeiro Gonçalves

15 April 2026 4	Águia de Marabá	2–1	Remo	Marabá
20:30 UTC−3	Willian Daltro (yellow card) 39'; Wendel 44'; PH (yellow card) 45'; Alex Silva (yellow card) 68'; Felipe Pará (yellow card) 78'; Weslley 88'	Report	Patrick de Paula 22'; Poveda (yellow card) 62' (yellow-red card) 90+6'; Tassano (yellow card) 78'	Stadium: Estádio Municipal Zinho de Oliveira; Attendance: 2,485; Referee: Daniel Alejandro Hidalgo Blanco

29 April 2026 5	Remo	2–1	Galvez	Castanhal
19:00 UTC−3	Tachtsidis 28'; Matheus Alexandre (yellow card) 29'; Cufré (yellow card) 45+1'; Catarozzi 80'	Report	Eduardo 19'	Stadium: Estádio Maximino Porpino Filho; Attendance: 1,669; Referee: Wesley Silva dos Santos

=== Super Copa Grão-Pará ===
Win Draw Loss

18 January 2026	Remo	2–1	Águia de Marabá	Belém
17:00 UTC−3	Léo Andrade (yellow card) 62'; Yago Pikachu 77', (yellow card) 90+5'; Eduardo Melo 89'	Report	Cássio (yellow card) 30'; PH 55'	Stadium: Mangueirão; Attendance: 27,543; Referee: Joelson Nazareno Ferreira Cardoso
