= 2025 Athletic Club (MG) season =

Athletic Club
2025 season
- President: Fábio Campos
- Manager: Roger
- Stadium: Arena Sicredi
- Campeonato Brasileiro Série B: Pre-season
- Campeonato Mineiro: Pre-season
- Copa do Brasil: Pre-season
- Top goalscorer: League: All: Welington (1)
- Average home league attendance: 2,282
Home colours	Away colours

The 2025 season is the 115th year in Athletic Club’s history. The club will take part in the Campeonato Brasileiro Série B after earning promotion, the Campeonato Mineiro, and the Copa do Brasil.

== Squad ==
=== Transfers In ===
Pos.	Player	Transferred from	Fee	Date	Source
DF	(Brazil) Matheus Mega	(Brazil) CRB	Loan	9 January 2025	
FW	(Brazil) Lincoln	(Austria) Rheindorf Altach	Loan	16 January 2025	

== Competitions ==
=== Overall record ===
Competition	First match	Last match	Starting round	Final position	Record							
Competition	First match	Last match	Starting round	Final position	Pld	W	D	L	GF	GA	GD	Win %
Série B	5 April 2025	22 November 2025	Matchday 1		0	0	0	0	0	0	+0	—
Campeonato Mineiro	18 January 2025				1	1	0	0	1	0	+1	100.00
Copa do Brasil	25 February 2025	12 March 2025	First round	Second round	2	1	1	0	5	4	+1	50.00
Total					3	2	1	0	6	4	+2	66.67

Last updated: 18 January 2025
Source: Competitions

=== Série B ===
==== League table ====
Pos	Team	Pld	W	D	L	GF	GA	GD	Pts	Promotion or relegation
13	Vila Nova	38	11	14	13	40	44	−4	47	
14	América Mineiro	38	12	10	16	41	44	−3	46	
15	Athletic	38	12	8	18	43	53	−10	44	
16	Botafogo-SP	38	10	12	16	32	52	−20	42	
17	Ferroviária (R)	38	8	16	14	43	52	−9	40	Relegation to 2026 Campeonato Brasileiro Série C

Source: CBF
Rules for classification: 1) points; 2) wins; 3) goal difference; 4) goals scored; 5) head-to-head results (only between 2 teams); 6) fewest red cards; 7) fewest yellow cards; 8) drawing of lots.
(R) Relegated

==== Matches ====
7 April 2025 1	Atlético Goianiense	4–2	Athletic Club	Goiânia
19:00 UTC−3	Raí Ramos 43'; Matheus Felipe 69'; Sandro Lima 80'; Robert 90+3'		Amorim 9'; Lincoln 88'	Stadium: Estádio Antônio Accioly

13 April 2025 2	Athletic Club	1–2	CRB	Belo Horizonte
16:00 UTC−3	Lincoln 29'	Report	Gegê 52'; Douglas Baggio 90+1'	Stadium: Arena Independência; Referee: Fernando Mendes

28 July 2025 19	Paysandu	1–1	Athletic Club

4 August 2025 20	Athletic Club	1–1	Atlético Goianiense

12 August 2025 21	CRB	1–0	Athletic Club

18 August 2025 22	Athletic Club	1–1	Criciúma

=== Campeonato Mineiro ===
==== Results by round ====
Round	1	2
Ground	A	H
Result	W	
Position		

Updated to match(es) played on 18 January 2025. Source:
A = Away; H = Home; W = Win; D = Draw; L = Loss

18 January 2025 1	Pouso Alegre	0–1	Athletic Club
17:00 UTC−3			Welington 75'

22 January 2025 2	Athletic Club	1–0	Cruzeiro	Brasília
19:00 UTC−3	Fabrício Bruno 70' (o.g.)	Report		Stadium: Estádio Nacional Mané Garrincha; Attendance: 11,854; Referee: Daniel da Cunha Oliveira Filho

4 February 6	Atlético Mineiro	1–0	Athletic Club	Belo Horizonte
21:30 UTC−3	Hulk 45+3'	Report		Stadium: Mineirão; Attendance: 15,965; Referee: André Luiz Skettino Policarpo Bento

=== Copa do Brasil ===
25 February 2025 First round	Barcelona de Ilhéus	1–2	Athletic Club	Jequié
19:30	Alesandro 85'	Report	Edson Alves 26'; Welinton 43'	Stadium: Estádio Waldomiro Borges; Attendance: 97; Referee: Paulo Henrique Schleich Vollkopf (Mato Grosso do Sul)

12 March 2025 Second round	Athletic Club	3–3 (7–8 p)	Grêmio	São João del-Rei
19:30	David 2'; Diego Fumaça 47'; João Lucas 90+3' (o.g.)	Report	Braithwaite 10'; João Lucas 20'; Arezo 87'	Stadium: Estádio Joaquim Portugal; Attendance: 3,600; Referee: Matheus Delgado Candançan (São Paulo)
	Penalties
	David (penalty scored); Diego Fumaça (penalty scored); Yuri (penalty scored); Wesley Gasolina (penalty scored); Mateus Gonçalves (penalty scored); Neto Costa (penalty scored); Alexsandro (penalty scored); Edson Alves (penalty missed)		(penalty scored) Wagner Leonardo; (penalty scored) Jemerson; (penalty scored) Arezo; (penalty scored) Olivera; (penalty scored) Dodi; (penalty scored) Camilo; (penalty scored) Gustavo Martins; (penalty scored) João Lucas
