= Andrés González (footballer, born 2006) =

Colombian footballer

Personal information
- Full name: Andrés Dionicio Moreno González
- Date of birth: 29 June 2006 (age 20)
- Place of birth: Sipí, Colombia
- Height: 1.88 m (6 ft 2 in)
- Position: Forward

Team information
- Current team: Remo
- Number: 20

Youth career
- Deportivo Cali

Senior career*
Years	Team	Apps	(Gls)
2026–	Amazônia Independente	5	(0)
2026–	→ Remo (loan)	1	(0)
- * Club domestic league appearances and goals as of 23 October 2026

Andrés Dionicio Moreno González (born 29 June 2006) is a Colombian footballer who plays as a forward for Brazilian club Remo, on loan from Amazônia Independente.

== Career ==
Born in Sipí, González played for the youth sides of Deportivo Cali before joining Amazônia Independente in January 2026. On 2 March, he renewed his contract with the latter, and was loaned to Remo, initially for the youth categories.

González first appeared with the main squad of the Leão Azul on 26 March 2026, in a 2–1 Copa Norte away loss to Porto Velho. After mainly featuring for the under-20s, he was promoted to the first team by head coach Thiago Carpini in October, and made his Série A debut late in that month, coming on as a late substitute for Zé Welison in a 1–0 away loss to Cruzeiro.

== Career statistics ==
As of 27 October 2026

Club	Season	League			State League		Cup		Continental		Other		Total	
Club	Season	Division	Apps	Goals	Apps	Goals	Apps	Goals	Apps	Goals	Apps	Goals	Apps	Goals
Amazônia Independente	2026	Paraense	—		5	0	—		—		—		5	0
Remo	2026	Série A	1	0	—		0	0	—		1 (Note: Appearance(s) in Copa Norte)	0	2	0
Career total			1	0	5	0	0	0	0	0	1	0	7	0
