= David Braga =

Brazilian footballer

Personal information
- Full name: David Francisco Trindade Braga
- Date of birth: 11 December 2001 (age 24)
- Place of birth: Itabirito, Brazil
- Height: 1.86 m (6 ft 1 in)
- Position: Attacking midfielder

Team information
- Current team: Remo
- Number: 26

Youth career
- 2021–2022: Desportivo Brasil

Senior career*
Years	Team	Apps	(Gls)
2022–2023	Desportivo Brasil	9	(0)
2023	→ Athletic-MG (loan)	5	(0)
2023–2026	Athletic-MG	86	(17)
2023	→ Atlético Goianiense (loan)	12	(2)
2026–	Remo	1	(0)
- * Club domestic league appearances and goals as of 01:44, 3 April 2026 (UTC)

David Francisco Trindade Braga (born 11 December 2001), known as David Braga, is a Brazilian professional footballer who plays as an attacking midfielder for Remo.

== Career ==
Born in Itabirito, Minas Gerais, Braga played for amateur sides in his hometown before joining Desportivo Brasil's under-20 team in 2021. After making his first team debut in the 2022 Campeonato Paulista Série A3, he was close to a move to América Mineiro ahead of the 2023 season, but was announced at Athletic-MG instead on 9 February 2023.

After impressing in the 2023 Campeonato Mineiro, Braga was bought by Athletic and moved to Série B side Atlético Goianiense on 20 April of that year. Back to his parent club in December after being sparingly used, he helped Athletic to achieve a first-ever promotion to the second division in 2024, being elected the Breakthrough player of the Série C in that year.

On 29 January 2025, Braga scored a hat-trick in a 6–1 home win over Villa Nova. He finished the season with ten goals, being the Athletic's top scorer as they narrowly avoided relegation.

On 27 March 2026, Braga was announced at Série A side Remo. He made his top tier debut six days later, coming on as a half-time substitute for Zé Ricardo in a 2–0 away loss to Santos.

== Career statistics ==
As of match played 2 April 2026

Club	Season	League			State League		Cup		Continental		Other		Total	
Club	Season	Division	Apps	Goals	Apps	Goals	Apps	Goals	Apps	Goals	Apps	Goals	Apps	Goals
Desportivo Brasil	2022	Paulista A3	—		9	0	—		—		12 (Note: Appearance(s) in Copa Paulista)	1	21	1
Athletic-MG	2023	Série D	—		5	0	1	0	—		—		6	0
Athletic-MG	2024	Série C	25	7	10	1	1	0	—		—		36	8
Athletic-MG	2025	Série B	33	6	11	3	2	1	—		—		46	10
Athletic-MG	2026	Série B	0	0	7	0	3	1	—		—		10	1
Athletic-MG	Total		58	13	33	4	7	2	—		—		98	19
Atlético Goianiense (loan)	2023	Série B	12	2	—		—		—		—		12	2
Remo	2026	Série A	1	0	—		0	0	—		1 (Note: Appearance(s) in Copa Norte)	0	2	0
Career total			71	15	42	4	7	2	0	0	13	1	133	22
