= Zé Ivaldo =

Brazilian footballer

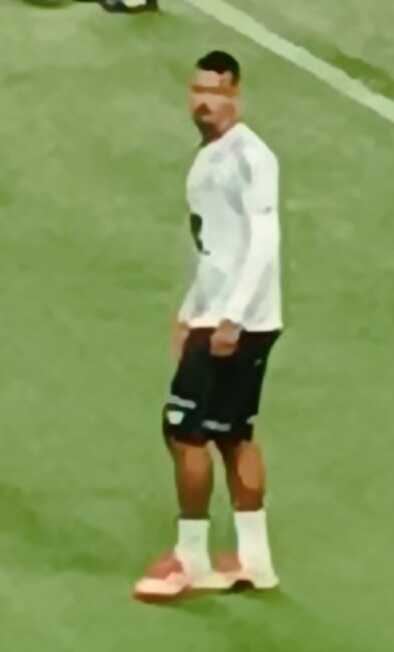
- Zé Ivaldo warming up with Santos in 2025

Personal information
- Full name: José Ivaldo Almeida Silva
- Date of birth: 21 February 1997 (age 29)
- Place of birth: Cajueiro, Brazil
- Height: 1.85 m (6 ft 1 in)
- Position: Centre-back

Team information
- Current team: Remo (on loan from Santos)
- Number: 27

Youth career
- CRB
- 2014–2015: → Atlético Paranaense (loan)

Senior career*
Years	Team	Apps	(Gls)
2015	CRB	0	(0)
2015	→ Atlético Paranaense (loan)	1	(0)
2015–2023	Athletico Paranaense	115	(5)
2019	→ Vitória (loan)	11	(0)
2022	→ Cruzeiro (loan)	30	(1)
2024–2025	Cruzeiro	38	(3)
2025	→ Santos (loan)	33	(1)
2026–	Santos	12	(0)
2026–	→ Remo (loan)	0	(0)
- * Club domestic league appearances and goals as of 13:22, 9 April 2026 (UTC)

José Ivaldo Almeida Silva (born 21 February 1997), known as Zé Ivaldo, is a Brazilian footballer who plays as a centre-back for Remo, on loan from Santos.

== Early life ==
Born in Cajueiro, Alagoas, Zé Ivaldo helped his grandparents to grow corns and watermelons while studying. After failed trials at Fluminense and Cruzeiro, he joined the youth sides of CRB, and played in the 2014 Copa São Paulo de Futebol Júnior for the club.

== Career ==
=== Athletico Paranaense ===
In 2014, Zé Ivaldo was loaned to Atlético Paranaense's youth sides, being initially assigned to the under-17 team. He made his first team debut on 2 May 2015, starting in a 5–0 Campeonato Paranaense home routing of Nacional-PR. On 15 June, he was bought outright by the club, and signed a contract until June 2020.

Definitely promoted to the main squad ahead of the 2016 season, Zé Ivaldo only featured in two matches during the entire year. In 2017, he was a starter in the year's Paranaense, scoring his first goal on 18 March in a 4–0 home success over FC Cascavel.

Zé Ivaldo made his Série A debut on 14 May 2017, playing the full 90 minutes in a 6–2 away loss to Bahia. He started to feature more regularly in the following year, and scored his first goal in the top tier on 19 August 2018, in a 3–0 home win over Flamengo.

==== Loan to Vitória ====
On 17 May 2019, after struggling with his weight, Zé Ivaldo was loaned to Série B side Vitória until the end of the year. He suffered a knee injury in July, being sidelined for two months, and returned to his parent club after just 11 appearances.

==== 2020–21: breakthrough ====
Back to Athletico, Zé Ivaldo was initially a fifth-choice behind Thiago Heleno, Felipe Aguilar, Lucas Halter and Edu; he still renewed his contract for a further year on 15 June 2020. He became a third-choice in the 2021 campaign (only behind Thiago Heleno and Pedro Henrique), and further extended his link until 2023 on 10 May of that year.

Zé Ivaldo finished the 2021 season with Furacão with three goals in 50 appearances, winning the 2021 Copa Sudamericana.

==== Loan to Cruzeiro ====
On 12 April 2022, Zé Ivaldo was announced on loan at Cruzeiro until the end of the year. He immediately became a first-choice at the club, scoring once in 33 appearances overall as they returned to the top tier as champions.

==== 2023 season ====
Back to Athletico, Zé Ivaldo was a regular starter in the 2023 Campeonato Paranaense, but after allegedly agreeing to a pre-contract with Cruzeiro in July, he was separated from the first team squad in August. On 16 October, he left the club after agreeing to terminate his contract early.

=== Cruzeiro return ===
On 31 October 2023, Cruzeiro confirmed Zé Ivaldo's pre-contract, and the player started training with the club. He was a first-choice during most of the 2024 season, but lost his starting spot after the arrival of Fernando Diniz as head coach.

=== Santos ===
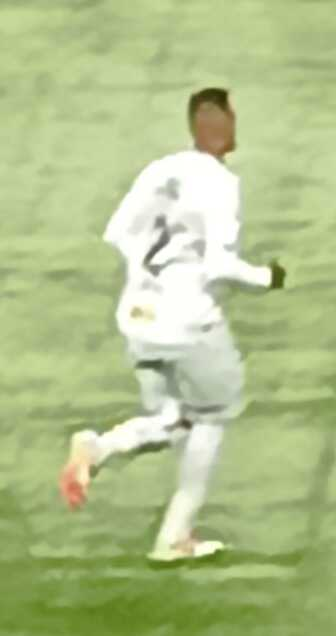
Zé Ivaldo playing for Santos in 2025

On 11 January 2025, Santos confirmed the signing of Zé Ivaldo on a one-year loan deal, with a buyout clause. He made his club debut six days later, replacing João Basso in a 2–1 Campeonato Paulista home win over Mirassol.

Zé Ivaldo scored his first goal for the club on 17 April 2025, netting the opener in a 2–0 home win over Atlético Mineiro. In July, after a poor performance against Mirassol, he was separated from the first team, only returning one month later after the arrival of new head coach Juan Pablo Vojvoda.

On 8 January 2026, after regaining a starting spot under Vojvoda, Zé Ivaldo's permanent contract with Peixe was registered after he reached conditions for an obligatory buyout clause. However, he started the season under poor form, committing three penalties in his first seven appearances of the year.

==== Loan to Remo ====
On 16 July 2026, after losing his first-choice status, Zé Ivaldo was loaned to Remo also in the top tier until December.

== Career statistics ==
As of 9 April 2026

Club	Season	League			State League		Cup		Continental		Other		Total	
Club	Season	Division	Apps	Goals	Apps	Goals	Apps	Goals	Apps	Goals	Apps	Goals	Apps	Goals
Athletico Paranaense	2015	Série A	0	0	1	0	—		—		—		1	0
Athletico Paranaense	2016	Série A	0	0	0	0	2	0	—		—		2	0
Athletico Paranaense	2017	Série A	6	0	12	1	0	0	2 (Note: Appearance(s) in Copa Libertadores)	0	—		20	1
Athletico Paranaense	2018	Série A	19	1	10	1	5	0	2 (Note: Appearance(s) in Copa Sudamericana)	0	—		34	2
Athletico Paranaense	2019	Série A	0	0	7	0	0	0	1	0	—		8	0
Athletico Paranaense	2020	Série A	14	0	2	0	1	0	1	0	0	0	18	0
Athletico Paranaense	2021	Série A	30	1	7	0	5	2	8	0	—		50	3
Athletico Paranaense	2022	Série A	0	0	4	0	0	0	0	0	1 (Note: Appearance(s) in Recopa Sudamericana)	0	5	0
Athletico Paranaense	2023	Série A	14	0	10	2	5	0	6	0	—		35	2
Athletico Paranaense	Subtotal		83	2	53	4	18	2	20	0	1	0	175	8
Vitória (loan)	2019	Série B	11	0	—		—		—		—		11	0
Cruzeiro (loan)	2022	Série B	30	1	—		3	0	—		—		33	1
Cruzeiro	2024	Série A	29	1	9	2	1	0	11	1	—		50	4
Santos	2025	Série A	21	1	12	0	2	0	—		—		35	1
Santos	2026	Série A	5	0	7	0	0	0	0	0	—		12	0
Santos	Subtotal		26	1	19	0	2	0	0	0	—		47	1
Remo (loan)	2026	Série A	0	0	—		—		—		—		0	0
Career total			179	5	81	6	24	2	31	1	1	0	316	14

== Honours ==
Athletico Paranaense

- Campeonato Paranaense: 2018, 2019, 2020, 2023
- Copa Sudamericana: 2018

Cruzeiro

- Campeonato Brasileiro Série B: 2022
