= Flávio Garcia =

Brazilian football coach (born 1987)

Personal information
- Full name: Flávio Matheus Garcia da Silva
- Date of birth: 6 December 1987 (age 38)
- Place of birth: São Carlos, Brazil

Team information
- Current team: Remo (assistant)

Managerial career
- Years: Team
- 2014–2016: Juventus-SP (assistant)
- 2016: Uberaba (assistant)
- 2017–2019: URT (assistant)
- 2020: Avaí (assistant)
- 2020: Coritiba (assistant)
- 2021: Confiança (assistant)
- 2024–: Remo (assistant)
- 2025: Remo (interim)
- 2025: Remo (interim)
- 2026: Remo (interim)

Flávio Matheus Garcia da Silva (born 6 December 1987) is a Brazilian football coach, currently the assistant coach of Remo.

== Career ==
Born in São Carlos, São Paulo, Garcia worked in marketing before meeting Rodrigo Santana at São Carlos FC in 2013. In June of the following year, he left with Santana to become his assistant at Juventus-SP.

Garcia continued to work as Santana's assistant in the following years, at Uberaba and URT. On 25 October 2018, he was appointed head coach of the latter for the upcoming season after Santana left, but was replaced by Sidney Moraes the following 16 January, returning to his previous role before even having coached in an official match.

In March 2019, Garcia returned to Uberaba as a director of football. In February of the following year, he rejoined Santana's staff at Avaí, again as an assistant, and continued to work with him at Coritiba and Confiança.

In 2023, Garcia joined Retrô as a youth coordinator, and was also in charge of the club in a 2–1 Série D home win over Atlético de Alagoinhas as head coach Marcelo Martelotte was suspended. In May 2024, he moved to Remo again as Santana's assistant.

García remained at Remo after Santana's departure, being an interim head coach on five matches during the 2025 season. On 1 March 2026, he was again interim after Juan Carlos Osorio was dismissed, and led the club in the second leg of the 2026 Campeonato Paraense finals to a 0–0 draw against rivals Paysandu (2–1 aggregate loss).
