= Sipí =

Coordinates: 4°39′N 76°29′W

- Municipality and town
- Flag

- Location of the municipality and town of Sipí in the Chocó Department of Colombia.
- Country: Colombia
- Department: Chocó Department
- Time zone: UTC-5 (Colombia Standard Time)

Sipí is a municipality and town in the Chocó Department, Colombia.

An 1853 watercolor by Manuel María Paz showing a house in Sipí, built on a raised platform with a notched treetrunk for steps, is held by the National Library of Colombia.

== Climate ==
Sipí has a very wet tropical rainforest climate (Af) with very heavy rainfall year-round.

Climate data for Sipí
Month	Jan	Feb	Mar	Apr	May	Jun	Jul	Aug	Sep	Oct	Nov	Dec	Year
Mean daily maximum °C (°F)	30.3 (86.5)	30.4 (86.7)	30.7 (87.3)	30.6 (87.1)	30.5 (86.9)	30.5 (86.9)	30.8 (87.4)	30.6 (87.1)	30.5 (86.9)	29.8 (85.6)	29.6 (85.3)	29.7 (85.5)	30.3 (86.6)
Daily mean °C (°F)	26.2 (79.2)	26.3 (79.3)	26.6 (79.9)	26.5 (79.7)	26.4 (79.5)	26.3 (79.3)	26.5 (79.7)	26.3 (79.3)	26.3 (79.3)	25.8 (78.4)	25.8 (78.4)	25.8 (78.4)	26.2 (79.2)
Mean daily minimum °C (°F)	22.1 (71.8)	22.2 (72.0)	22.5 (72.5)	22.5 (72.5)	22.4 (72.3)	22.1 (71.8)	22.2 (72.0)	22.1 (71.8)	22.1 (71.8)	21.9 (71.4)	22.0 (71.6)	22.0 (71.6)	22.2 (71.9)
Average rainfall mm (inches)	441 (17.4)	386 (15.2)	440 (17.3)	503 (19.8)	556 (21.9)	503 (19.8)	483 (19.0)	521 (20.5)	558 (22.0)	611 (24.1)	547 (21.5)	477 (18.8)	6,026 (237.3)
