= Patrick (footballer, born 1992) =

Brazilian footballer

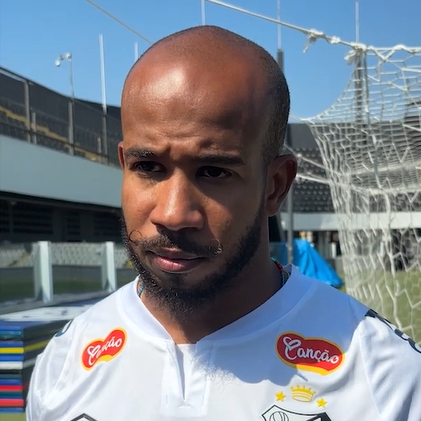
- Patrick with Santos in 2024

Personal information
- Full name: Patrick Bezerra do Nascimento
- Date of birth: 29 July 1992 (age 34)
- Place of birth: Rio de Janeiro, Brazil
- Height: 1.76 m (5 ft 9 in)
- Position: Midfielder

Team information
- Current team: Remo (on loan from Santos)
- Number: 8

Youth career
- 2011–2013: Operário Ferroviário

Senior career*
Years	Team	Apps	(Gls)
2011–2013	Operário Ferroviário	36	(1)
2013	→ Marcílio Dias (loan)	18	(3)
2013	→ Caxias (loan)	3	(0)
2014	Comercial-SP	12	(1)
2014–2015	Gaziantepspor	0	(0)
2015–2019	Monte Azul	0	(0)
2015	→ Caxias (loan)	12	(1)
2015–2017	→ Goiás (loan)	88	(4)
2017	→ Sport Recife (loan)	31	(3)
2018–2019	→ Internacional (loan)	50	(7)
2019–2021	Internacional	113	(14)
2022	São Paulo	37	(5)
2023–2024	Atlético Mineiro	34	(1)
2024–	Santos	11	(0)
2025	→ Athletico Paranaense (loan)	35	(0)
2026–	→ Remo (loan)	14	(0)
- * Club domestic league appearances and goals as of 15:28, 19 May 2026 (UTC)

Patrick Bezerra do Nascimento (born 29 July 1992), simply known as Patrick, is a Brazilian professional footballer who plays as a midfielder for Remo, on loan from Santos.

== Career ==
=== Operário Ferroviário ===
Born in Rio de Janeiro, Patrick was rejected as a youth by hometown sides Flamengo, Vasco da Gama and Botafogo before becoming a youth graduate of Operário Ferroviário. He made his first team debut for the latter on 27 August 2011, coming on as a second-half substitute for Zé Leandro in a 1–0 Série D away win over Oeste.

Patrick scored his first senior goal on 10 March 2013, netting the equalizer in a 1–1 Campeonato Paranaense away draw against Coritiba.

==== Loans to Marcílio Dias and Caxias ====
In May 2013, Patrick was loaned to Marcílio Dias for the year's Série D. In September, after Marcílio were knocked out from the competition, he moved to Série C side Caxias also in a temporary deal, but only featured in three matches.

=== Comercial-SP ===
On 5 December 2013, Patrick was presented at Comercial de Ribeirão Preto, with his former team Operário stating that the transfer was illegal as the player had contract with them until December 2014. He nonetheless played the 2014 Campeonato Paulista for Comercial, scoring once in 12 matches.

=== Gaziantepspor ===
On 3 August 2014, Patrick moved abroad for the first time in his career, joining Turkish Süper Lig side Gaziantepspor. In the end of the month, however, he was released by the club.

=== Caxias return ===
After failing to play a single minute abroad, Patrick returned to Brazil on 5 January 2015, signing a contract with former side Caxias. He was a regular starter during the 2015 Campeonato Gaúcho, but was unable to avoid team relegation.

=== Goiás ===
On 14 May 2015, Patrick was presented at Série A side Goiás. He made his top tier debut two days later, starting in a 2–0 home win over Atlético Paranaense.

Patrick featured in 31 league matches during the campaign, as his side suffered relegation. He subsequently helped the club to win two Campeonato Goiano titles in a row, being a regular starter in both tournaments.

=== Sport Recife ===
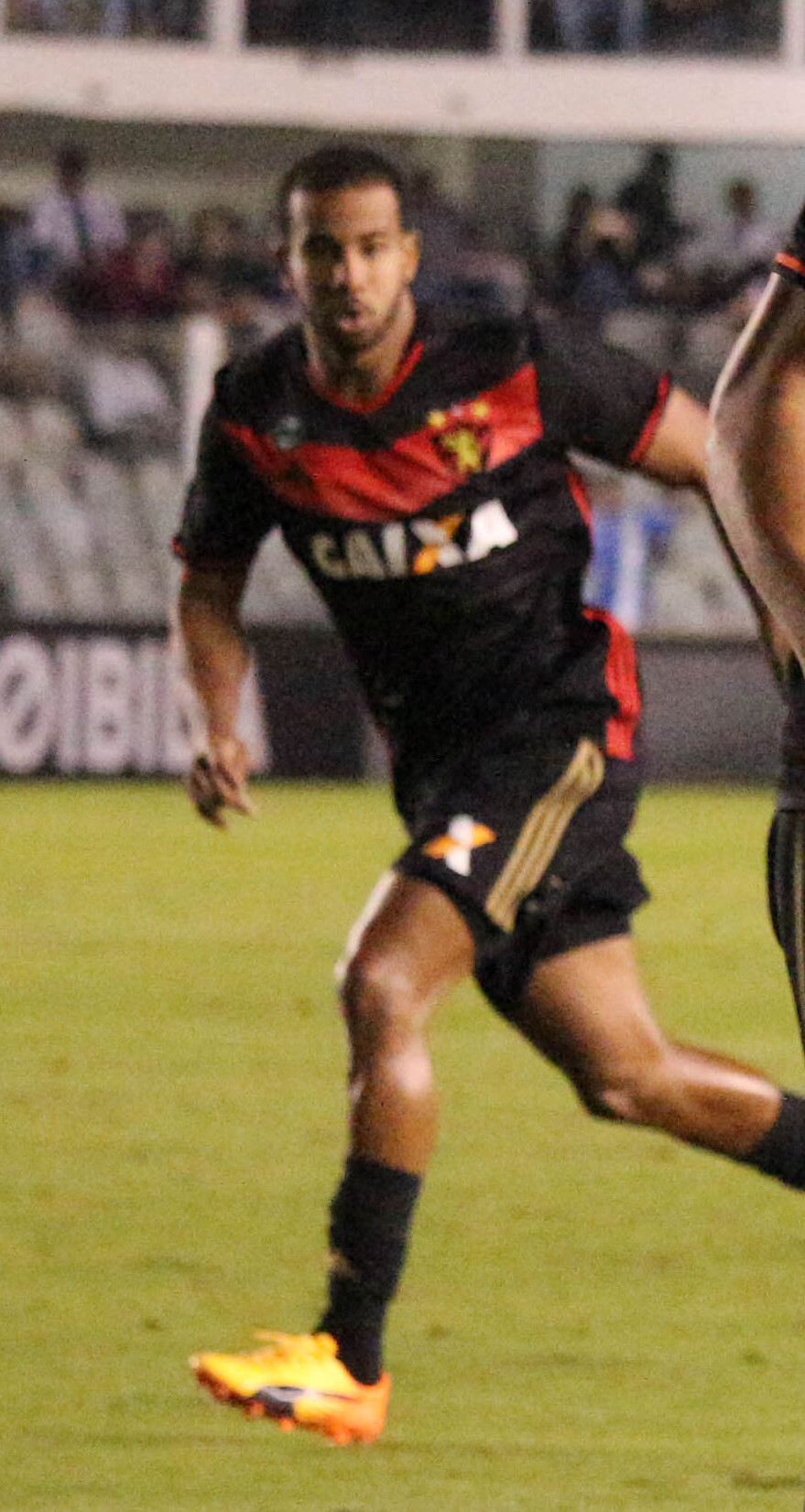
Patrick playing for Sport Recife in 2017

On 3 June 2017, Patrick left Goiás and joined Sport Recife in the main category. He scored his first goal in the division on 20 July, netting the opener of a 4–0 home routing of Atlético Goianiense.

Patrick scored a further two goals in the 2017 Série A, being a first-choice as the club avoided relegation.

=== Internacional ===
On 29 December 2017, Patrick signed a two-year deal with Internacional. He made his club debut on 21 January 2018, starting in a 3–0 away win over Novo Hamburgo.

Patrick was the most used player of Inter during the 2018 season, featuring in 51 matches overall and scoring eight goals. On 12 March 2019, the club bought 50% of his economic rights (which belonged to a group of businessman and were assigned at Monte Azul), and he renewed his contract until 2021.

Patrick continued to feature regularly for the Colorado in the following years, scoring a career-best six goals in the 2020 Série A, including a brace in a 5–3 away win over former side Sport Recife. On 18 June 2021, he renewed his contract with Inter until June 2023.

=== São Paulo ===
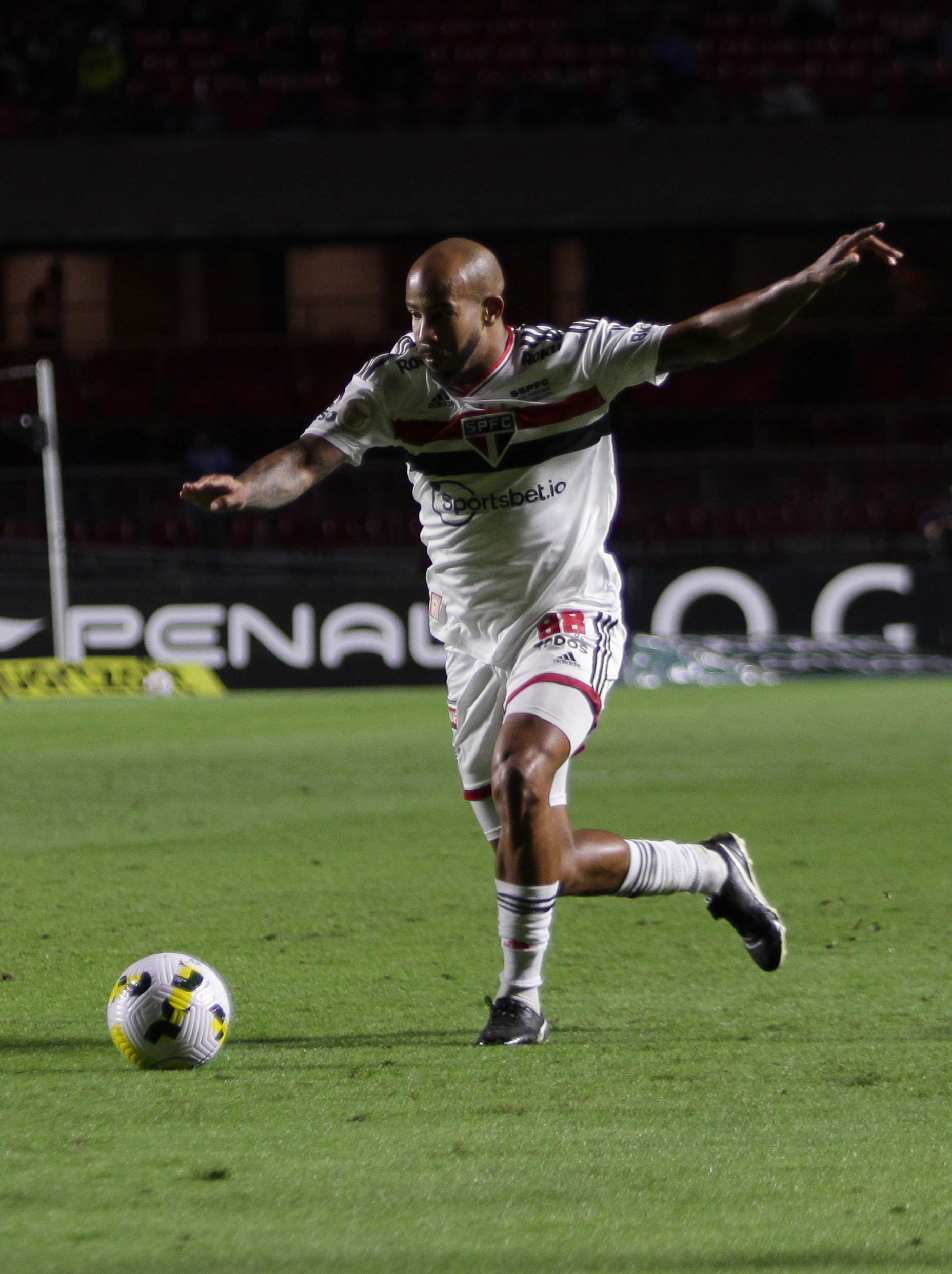
Patrick in action for São Paulo in 2022

On 8 January 2022, Patrick joined São Paulo FC on a two-year deal. In his first two matches for his new side, he provided two assists and scored once through a bicycle kick, but suffered a thigh injury which sidelined him for more than a month.

After only six matches in the 2022 Campeonato Paulista, Patrick was regularly used in the 2022 Série A, despite being criticized from the supporters due to his weight. He finished the 2022 campaign with 55 appearances, nine goals and eight assists.

=== Atlético Mineiro ===
On 19 January 2023, Patrick signed a three-year contract with Atlético Mineiro. After being a part of the squad which won the 2023 Campeonato Mineiro, he was mainly a backup option during the 2023 Série A.

Patrick started the 2024 season as a backup, being deemed surplus to requirements in March.

=== Santos ===
On 19 April 2024, Santos announced the signing of Patrick on a contract valid until December 2026. He made his debut for the club on 7 May, replacing Rómulo Otero in a 4–1 Série B home routing of Guarani.

Despite being signed as one of the main additions of the club for the remainder of the season, Patrick struggled to find his best form at Peixe, with club president Marcelo Teixeira stating that "measures would be taken" until July if the player could not perform at the level of his teammates.

==== Loan to Athletico Paranaense ====
On 12 February 2025, Athletico Paranaense announced the signing of Patrick on loan until the end of the year.

==== Loan to Remo ====
On 5 January 2026, Remo agreed to sign Patrick on loan until December.

== Career statistics ==
As of 19 May 2026

Club	Season	League			State League		Cup		Continental		Other		Total	
Club	Season	Division	Apps	Goals	Apps	Goals	Apps	Goals	Apps	Goals	Apps	Goals	Apps	Goals
Operário Ferroviário	2011	Série D	2	0	0	0	—		—		—		2	0
Operário Ferroviário	2012	Paranaense	—		16	0	1	0	—		—		17	0
Operário Ferroviário	2013	Paranaense	—		18	1	—		—		—		18	1
Operário Ferroviário	Total		2	0	34	1	1	0	—		—		37	1
Marcílio Dias	2013	Série D	8	0	10	3	—		—		—		18	3
Caxias	2013	Série C	3	0	—		—		—		—		3	0
Comercial-SP	2014	Paulista	—		12	1	—		—		—		12	1
Caxias	2015	Série C	0	0	12	1	1	0	—		—		13	1
Goiás	2015	Série A	31	0	—		—		1 (Note: Appearance(s) in Copa Sudamericana)	0	—		32	0
Goiás	2016	Série B	23	1	17	2	2	0	—		—		42	3
Goiás	2017	Série B	3	0	14	1	5	1	—		—		22	2
Goiás	Total		57	1	31	3	7	1	1	0	—		96	5
Sport Recife	2017	Série A	31	3	—		—		6	0	—		37	3
Internacional	2018	Série A	36	5	9	1	6	2	—		—		51	8
Internacional	2019	Série A	24	2	8	1	6	1	10 (Note: Appearance(s) in Copa Libertadores)	1	—		48	5
Internacional	2020	Série A	33	6	10	2	3	0	6	0	—		52	8
Internacional	2021	Série A	34	3	9	1	2	0	3	1	—		48	5
Internacional	Total		127	16	36	5	17	3	19	2	—		199	26
São Paulo	2022	Série A	31	5	6	0	8	1	10	3	—		55	9
Atlético Mineiro	2023	Série A	23	0	8	1	4	0	10	0	—		45	1
Atlético Mineiro	2024	Série A	0	0	3	0	0	0	0	0	—		3	0
Atlético Mineiro	Total		23	0	11	1	4	0	10	0	—		48	1
Santos	2024	Série B	10	0	—		—		—		—		10	0
Santos	2025	Série A	0	0	1	0	0	0	—		—		1	0
Santos	Total		10	0	1	0	0	0	—		—		11	0
Athletico Paranaense (loan)	2025	Série B	31	0	4	0	6	0	—		—		41	0
Remo (loan)	2026	Série A	13	0	1	0	2	1	—		1 (Note: Appearance(s) in Copa Norte)	0	17	1
Career total			336	25	158	15	46	6	46	5	1	0	587	51

== Honours ==
Marcílio Dias

- Campeonato Catarinense Série B: 2013

Goiás

- Campeonato Goiano: 2016, 2017

Atlético Mineiro

- Campeonato Mineiro: 2023, 2024

Santos

- Campeonato Brasileiro Série B: 2024
