= Patrick de Paula =

Brazilian footballer

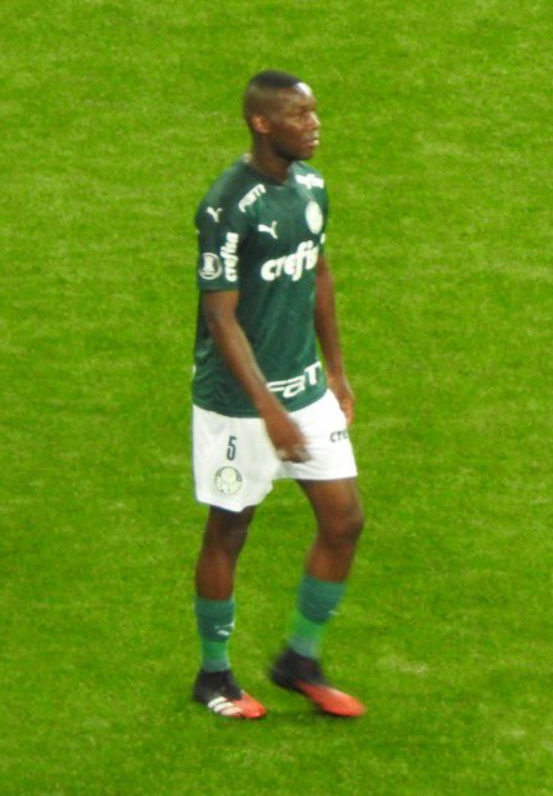
- Patrick playing for Palmeiras in 2020

Personal information
- Full name: Patrick de Paula Carreiro
- Date of birth: 8 September 1999 (age 27)
- Place of birth: Rio de Janeiro, Brazil
- Height: 1.80 m (5 ft 11 in)
- Position: Midfielder

Team information
- Current team: Sport Recife
- Number: 7

Youth career
- 2017–2019: Palmeiras

Senior career*
Years	Team	Apps	(Gls)
2020–2022	Palmeiras	76	(4)
2022–2026	Botafogo	45	(4)
2024	→ Criciúma (loan)	5	(0)
2025–2026	→ Estoril (loan)	9	(0)
2026	→ Remo (loan)	11	(1)
2026–	Sport Recife	12	(2)
- * Club domestic league appearances and goals as of 17 November 2026

Patrick de Paula Carreiro (born 8 September 1999), commonly known as Patrick de Paula or simply Patrick, is a Brazilian professional footballer who plays as a midfielder for Campeonato Brasileiro Série B club Sport Recife.

== Club career ==
=== Palmeiras ===
Born in Rio de Janeiro, Patrick de Paula joined Palmeiras' youth setup in 2017, after playing amateur tournaments in his hometown. On 6 January 2019, he signed a contract extension with the club until the end of the year; in May, he further extended his deal until 2022.

On 28 November 2019, Patrick de Paula was promoted to Palmeiras' first team for the ensuing campaign. He made his senior debut the following 26 January, coming on as a late substitute for fellow youth graduate Gabriel Menino in a 0–0 Campeonato Paulista home draw against São Paulo.

=== Botafogo ===
After several speculations, Botafogo decided to pay the offer in accordance with the request by Palmeiras: 6 million euros (about R$33.3 million) for 50% of the federative rights of the midfielder, which turned into the signing most expensive in the history of Botafogo. The deal proposed by the team from Rio met the expectations of Leila Pereira's management at Palmeiras, after all, the club from São Paulo would continue with a percentage of the player and would earn a percentage of the payment in the event of a future negotiation.

It wasn't the debut of Patrick de Paula's dreams, he and the Botafogo team were defeated 3-1 by Corinthians on April 10, at Estádio Nilton Santos, for the Campeonato Brasileiro. Patrick scored his first goal for Fogão in the 3-0 victory, in the first leg of the third phase of the Copa do Brasil, where Botafogo beat Ceilândia.

Patrick de Paula had a serious injury detected in his left knee in the match against Flamengo for the Campeonato Carioca, after being submitted to imaging tests, he was detected an injury and required an surgical procedure. His recovery lasted the entire season.

Patrick de Paula only returned to training with the Botafogo group in February 2024. After 400 days away, Patrick de Paula returned to play for Botafogo in the 2–0 victory over Boavista, in the 2024 Taça Rio final.

Despite returning to the field at the State Championship, Patrick de Paula was not listed by Botafogo's technical committee for the following match, against Junior, in the group stage of the Libertadores da América.

==== Criciúma (loan) ====
On 22 August 2024, de Paula joined Criciúma on loan for the remainder of the 2024 season.

==== Estoril (loan) ====
On 29 July 2025, de Paula was sent on loan to Portuguese Primeira Liga side Estoril until the end of the 2025–26 season. However, on 7 January 2026, after scoring one goal in nine appearances for the club, his loan was terminated by mutual agreement.

==== Remo (loan) ====
The same day he left Estoril, de Paula was loaned to Clube do Remo, who had just been promoted to the Campeonato Brasileiro Série A, until the end of the 2026 season.

== Career statistics ==
As of match played 7 December 2025

Appearances and goals by club, season and competition
Club	Season	League			State league		National cup		Continental		Other		Total	
Club	Season	Division	Apps	Goals	Apps	Goals	Apps	Goals	Apps	Goals	Apps	Goals	Apps	Goals
Palmeiras	2020	Série A	27	3	11 (Note: Appearances in Campeonato Paulista)	1	4	0	6 (Note: Appearances in Copa Libertadores)	1	2 (Note: Appearances in FIFA Club World Cup)	0	50	5
Palmeiras	2021	Série A	26	0	8	0	1	0	10	3	2 (Note: Appearances in Recopa Sudamericana)	0	47	3
Palmeiras	2022	Série A	0	0	4	0	0	0	0	0	0	0	4	0
Palmeiras	Total		53	3	23	1	5	0	16	4	4	0	101	8
Botafogo	2022	Série A	18	1	—		4	1	—		—		22	2
Botafogo	2023	Série A	0	0	7 (Note: Appearances in Campeonato Carioca)	1	0	0	0	0	—		7	1
Botafogo	2024	Série A	4	0	1	0	2	0	1	0	—		8	0
Botafogo	2025	Série A	6	0	9	2	2	0	3	1	1 (Note: Appearance in Supercopa do Brasil)	1	21	4
Botafogo	Total		28	1	17	3	8	1	4	1	1	1	58	7
Criciúma (loan)	2024	Série A	5	0	—		0	0	—		—		5	0
Estoril (loan)	2025–26	Primeira Liga	9	1	—		0	0	—		0	0	9	1
Remo (loan)	2026	Série A	0	0	0	0	0	0	—		0	0	0	0
Career total			95	5	40	4	13	1	20	5	5	1	173	16

== Honours ==
Palmeiras

- Copa Libertadores: 2020, 2021,
- Copa do Brasil: 2020
- Campeonato Paulista: 2020, 2022
- Recopa Sudamericana: 2022

Botafogo

- Copa Libertadores: 2024

Individual

- Campeonato Paulista Team of the Year: 2020
- Campeonato Paulista Young Player of the Season: 2020
