= JP Galvão =

Brazilian footballer

Personal information
- Full name: João Pedro Galvão de Carvalho
- Date of birth: 7 May 2001 (age 25)
- Place of birth: Rio de Janeiro, Brazil
- Height: 1.84 m (6 ft 0 in)
- Position: Midfielder

Team information
- Current team: Guarani

Youth career
- Tigres do Brasil

Senior career*
Years	Team	Apps	(Gls)
2019	Tigres do Brasil	11	(0)
2019–2022	Vasco da Gama	1	(0)
2022	→ Botafogo B (loan)	0	(0)
2023–2025	Botafogo	8	(0)
2024	→ Inter de Limeira (loan)	5	(0)
2024	→ Chapecoense (loan)	14	(0)
2025	→ Inter de Limeira (loan)	0	(0)
2025–	Guarani	0	(0)
- * Club domestic league appearances and goals as of 08:01, 9 April 2025 (UTC)

João Pedro Galvão de Carvalho (born 7 May 2001), known as JP Galvão or simply João Pedro, is a Brazilian footballer who plays as a midfielder for Guarani.

== Club career ==
Born in Rio de Janeiro, Galvão joined Vasco da Gama in 2019 from Tigres do Brasil. He renewed his contract with Vasco in February 2021. In April 2022, he was loaned to Série A side Botafogo until November of the same year, with the option to make the deal permanent.

In January 2023, Galvão signed a two-year deal with Botafogo.

In January 2024, Botafogo renewed its relationship with JP Galvão, but subsequently agreed to loan the right-back to Inter de Limeira to compete in Paulistão 2024.

In March, JP Galvão, Botafogo's midfielder/right-back, was announced as Chapecoense's new reinforcement for the Serie B dispute. The 22-year-old athlete signed with the new club until November.

== International career ==
Galvão was called up to the Brazil national under-23 football team for training camps ahead of the 2020 Summer Olympics in Japan.

== Career statistics ==
As of 21 March 2023

Appearances and goals by club, season and competition
Club	Season	League			State League		Cup		Continental		Other		Total	
Club	Season	Division	Apps	Goals	Apps	Goals	Apps	Goals	Apps	Goals	Apps	Goals	Apps	Goals
Tigres do Brasil	2019	Carioca Série A2	—		11 (Note: Appearances in the Campeonato Carioca Série A2)	0	—		—		3 (Note: Appearances in the Copa Rio)	0	14	0
Vasco da Gama	2020	Série A	0	0	0	0	0	0	—		—		0	0
Vasco da Gama	2021	Série B	0	0	1 (Note: Appearances in the Campeonato Carioca)	0	0	0	—		—		1	0
Vasco da Gama	2022	Série B	0	0	0	0	0	0	—		—		0	0
Vasco da Gama	Total		0	0	1	0	0	0	—		—		1	0
Botafogo	2022	Série A	0	0	—		—		—		—		0	0
Botafogo	2023	Série A	0	0	4	0	0	0	0	0	—		4	0
Botafogo	Total		0	0	4	0	0	0	0	0	—		4	0
Career total			0	0	16	0	0	0	0	0	3	0	19	0
