= João Pedro (footballer, born 13 November 1996) =

Bissau-Guinean footballer (born 1996)

Personal information
- Full name: João Pedro Sousa Silva
- Date of birth: 13 November 1996 (age 29)
- Place of birth: Ponta Delgada, Portugal
- Height: 1.85 m (6 ft 1 in)
- Position: Forward

Team information
- Current team: Atlético Goianiense
- Number: 18

Youth career
- 2004–2013: Micaelense
- 2013–2015: Santa Clara
- 2015: Gil Vicente

Senior career*
Years	Team	Apps	(Gls)
2013–2015	Santa Clara	23	(1)
2015–2018	Gil Vicente	44	(4)
2018–2019	Trofense	44	(16)
2019–2020	Vitória Guimarães	10	(2)
2019–2020	Vitória Guimarães B	14	(10)
2020–2022	Paços Ferreira	42	(5)
2022	Bursaspor	13	(5)
2022–2024	Panetolikos	60	(10)
2024	Dibba Al-Hisn	0	(0)
2024–2025	Hanoi	25	(9)
2025–2026	Remo	23	(7)
2026–	Atlético Goianiense	12	(3)

International career^{‡}
2016	Portugal U20	7	(1)
2023–	Guinea-Bissau	2	(0)
- * Club domestic league appearances and goals as of 02:56, 7 November 2026 (UTC) ‡ National team caps and goals as of 02:01, 29 December 2023 (UTC)

João Pedro Sousa Silva (born 13 November 1996), known as João Pedro, is a professional footballer who plays as a forward for Campeonato Brasileiro Série B club Atlético Goianiense. Born in Portugal, he plays for the Guinea-Bissau national team.

== Club career ==
Born in Ponta Delgada in the Azores, João Pedro was a junior at hometown club C.D. Santa Clara when he made his professional debut in Segunda Liga on 23 November 2013, as a half-time substitute for Tiago Leonço in a 1–0 home loss against S.C. Braga B. The following 25 January, he scored his only goal for the team in a 3–1 away defeat to S.C. Farense.

After two seasons with Gil Vicente F.C. in the second division and as many with C.D. Trofense in the third, João Pedro signed a one-year contract with Primeira Liga side Vitória S.C. on 5 July 2019, with the option of two more. He made his debut on 1 August in a 4–0 home win (5–0 aggregate) over AS Jeunesse Esch of Luxembourg in the second qualifying round of the UEFA Europa League, playing the last seven minutes in place of Alexandre Guedes. Thirteen days later, again from the bench and at the Estádio D. Afonso Henriques, he scored his first goal in a 6–0 demolition of Latvia's FK Ventspils.

João Pedro scored twice from ten league appearances in his first season in Guimarães, starting with the only goal of a home win against former club Santa Clara on 18 January 2020, again as a substitute. On 1 July, he agreed to a new deal of two years with the option of as many more.

However, on 20 August 2020, João Pedro joined F.C. Paços de Ferreira on a three-year contract; Vitória retained a percentage of his economic rights, and a buyback option. In February 2022, he severed his ties and moved to Bursaspor in the Turkish TFF First League.

João Pedro continued to play abroad subsequently, with Panetolikos FC (Super League Greece), Hanoi FC (Vietnamese V.League 1) and Clube do Remo (Campeonato Brasileiro Série B). With the latter side, he achieved promotion to the Série A in 2025.

== International career ==
João Pedro represented Portugal at under-20 level, appearing in the 2016 Toulon Tournament. He switched his allegiance to Guinea-Bissau in 2023, earning his first cap on 13 October that year in a 1–0 friendly loss to Guinea in Setúbal.
