= Marllon =

Brazilian footballer (born 1992)

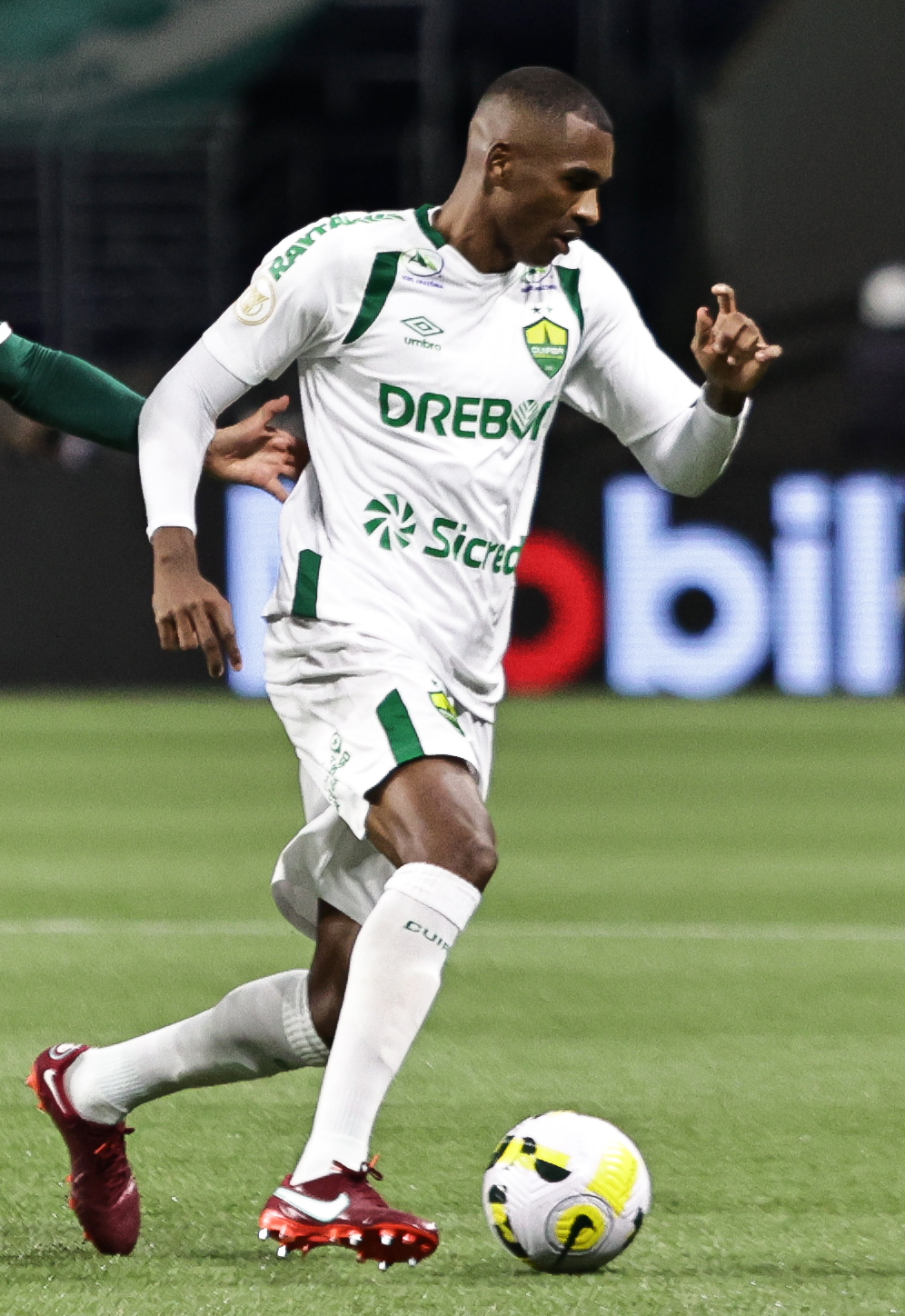

Personal information
- Full name: Marllon Jerónimo Gonçalves Borges
- Date of birth: 16 April 1992 (age 34)
- Place of birth: Rio de Janeiro, Brazil
- Height: 1.86 m (6 ft 1 in)
- Position: Centre back

Team information
- Current team: Remo
- Number: 13

Youth career
- Fluminense
- 2007: Estácio de Sá
- 2008: Cruzeiro
- 2009: Bangu
- 2009–2012: Flamengo

Senior career*
Years	Team	Apps	(Gls)
2011–2014	Flamengo	17	(0)
2011	→ Duque de Caxias (loan)	0	(0)
2013	→ Boavista (loan)	0	(0)
2014	→ Rio Claro (loan)	7	(0)
2014	→ Santa Cruz (loan)	5	(0)
2015	Capivariano	14	(1)
2015–2016	Atlético Goianiense	66	(3)
2017–2018	Cianorte	0	(0)
2017	→ Ponte Preta (loan)	48	(1)
2018–2021	Corinthians	24	(0)
2019	→ Bahia (loan)	0	(0)
2020	→ Cruzeiro (loan)	4	(1)
2021–2024	Cuiabá	84	(4)
2025–2026	Ceará	33	(3)
2026–	Remo	14	(0)
- * Club domestic league appearances and goals as of 9 April 2026

Marllon Jerónimo Gonçalves Borges (born 16 April 1992), simply known as Marllon, is a Brazilian footballer who plays as a central defender for Remo.

== Club career ==
=== Early career ===
Marllon was born in Rio de Janeiro, and started his youth career at Estácio de Sá after being released by Fluminense. After spells at Bangu and Cruzeiro, he joined Flamengo's youth setup in 2009.

On 21 January 2012, after returning from a failed loan at Duque de Caxias, Marllon made his senior debut by starting in a 4–0 home routing of Bonsucesso for the Campeonato Carioca championship. He made his Série A debut on 7 June 2012, playing the full 90 minutes in a 2–2 away draw against Ponte Preta.

Regularly used under Joel Santana, Marllon lost his space after the arrival of Dorival Júnior, and subsequently served loans at Boavista and Rio Claro, where he failed to impress. On 7 May 2014 he signed for Série B club Santa Cruz, after his contract with Flamengo expired. After again appearing rarely, he subsequently left the club and joined Capivariano.

=== Atlético Goianiense ===
On 26 May 2015, Marllon moved to Atlético Goianiense, also in the second level. An undisputed starter during the 2016 season, he contributed with two goals and 36 appearances as his side achieved promotion to the top tier as champions.

== Career statistics ==
As of 26 February 2023

Appearances and goals by club, season and competition
Club	Season	League			State League		Cup		Continental		Other		Total	
Club	Season	Division	Apps	Goals	Apps	Goals	Apps	Goals	Apps	Goals	Apps	Goals	Apps	Goals
Flamengo	2011	Série A	0	0	0	0	0	0	—		—		0	0
Flamengo	2012	Série A	12	0	4	0	0	0	0	0	—		16	0
Flamengo	2013	Série A	0	0	0	0	0	0	—		—		0	0
Flamengo	Total		12	0	4	0	0	0	0	0	0	0	16	0
Duque de Caxias (loan)	2011	Série B	0	0	—		—		—		0	0	0	0
Boavista (loan)	2013	Carioca	—		0	0	—		—		0	0	0	0
Rio Claro (loan)	2014	Paulista	—		7	0	—		—		—		7	0
Santa Cruz (loan)	2014	Série B	5	0	—		2	0	—		—		7	0
Capivariano	2015	Paulista	—		14	1	4	1	—		—		18	1
Atlético Goianiense	2015	Série B	16	0	—		—		—		—		16	0
Atlético Goianiense	2016	Série B	36	2	14	1	2	0	—		—		52	3
Atlético Goianiense	Total		52	2	14	1	2	0	0	0	0	0	68	3
Ponte Preta	2017	Série A	31	0	15	1	1	0	6 (Note: Appearance(s) in Copa Sudamericana)	0	—		53	1
Corinthians	2018	Série A	3	0	0	0	0	0	0	0	—		3	0
Corinthians	2019	Série A	4	0	6	0	2	0	1	0	—		13	0
Corinthians	2020	Série A	11	0	0	0	2	0	0	0	—		13	0
Corinthians	Total		18	0	6	0	4	0	1	0	—		29	0
Bahia (loan)	2019	Série A	0	0	—		—		—		—		0	0
Cruzeiro (loan)	2020	Série B	1	0	3	1	—		—		—		4	1
Cuiabá	2021	Série A	28	2	9	1	1	0	—		1 (Note: Appearance(s) in Copa Verde)	0	39	3
Cuiabá	2022	Série A	34	0	6	1	2	0	4	1	—		46	2
Cuiabá	2023	Série A	0	0	7	0	1	0	—		—		8	0
Cuiabá	Total		62	2	22	2	4	0	4	1	1	0	93	5
Career total			181	4	71	5	17	1	11	1	1	0	281	11

== Honours ==
=== Clubs ===
Flamengo

- Campeonato Carioca: 2011

Atlético Goianiense

- Campeonato Brasileiro Série B: 2016

Corinthians

- Campeonato Paulista: 2018, 2019

Cuiabá

- Campeonato Mato-Grossense: 2021, 2022, 2023, 2024

Ceará

- Campeonato Cearense: 2025

Remo

- Super Copa Grão-Pará: 2026
