= Nicolás Ferreira (footballer) =

Uruguayan footballer

Personal information
- Full name: Michael Nicolás Ferreira Berrondo
- Date of birth: February 7, 2002 (age 24)
- Place of birth: Montevideo, Uruguay
- Height: 1.73 m (5 ft 8 in)
- Position: Forward

Team information
- Current team: Ceará (on loan from Montevideo Wanderers)
- Number: 11

Youth career
- –2021: Montevideo Wanderers

Senior career*
Years	Team	Apps	(Gls)
2022–	Montevideo Wanderers	100	(10)
2025–2026	→ Remo (loan)	21	(4)
2026–	→ Ceará (loan)	12	(1)
- * Club domestic league appearances and goals as of 18 November 2026

Michael Nicolás Ferreira Berrondo (born 7 February 2002) is a Uruguayan professional footballer who plays as a forward for Campeonato Brasileiro Série B club Ceará, on loan from Montevideo Wanderers.

== Career ==
Ferreira began his professional career at Montevideo Wanderers, the same club where he trained. He stood out in the Clásico del Prado, scoring the winning goal for the Bohemios in their 1-0 victory over River Plate.

In August 2025, he had his first experience outside Uruguay when he was loaned to Remo, in the Brazilian second division.

== Honours ==
Remo

- Super Copa Grão-Pará: 2026
