= Franco Catarozzi =

Uruguayan football player (born 2000)

Personal information
- Full name: Franco Catarozzi Parafita
- Date of birth: 2 April 2000 (age 26)
- Place of birth: Montevideo, Uruguay
- Height: 1.79 m (5 ft 10 in)
- Position: Midfielder

Team information
- Current team: Remo
- Number: 23

Youth career
- Montevideo City Torque

Senior career*
Years	Team	Apps	(Gls)
2021–2025	Montevideo City Torque	95	(6)
2025	→ Nacional (loan)	1	(0)
2025	Liverpool Montevideo	15	(1)
2026–	Remo	2	(0)

International career^{‡}
2024–	Uruguay local	2	(0)
- * Club domestic league appearances and goals as of 9 April 2026 ‡ National team caps and goals as of 5 December 2024

Franco Catarozzi Parafita (born 2 April 2000) is a Uruguayan professional footballer who plays as a midfielder for Campeonato Brasileiro Série A club Remo.

== Club career ==
A youth academy graduate of Montevideo City Torque, Catarozzi made his professional debut on 4 February 2021 in a goalless draw against Defensor Sporting. He scored his first goal on 15 April 2021 in a 2–0 Copa Sudamericana win against Fénix.

In January 2025, Catarozzi joined Nacional on a season long loan deal. After playing two official matches for the club, his contract was terminated in July. On 29 July 2025, he joined Liverpool Montevideo.

== International career ==
In August 2024, Catarozzi was named in Uruguay local team squad for a friendly match against Guatemala. On 1 September 2024, he made his Uruguay local team debut in a 1–1 draw against Guatemala.

== Career statistics ==
As of 30 July 2025

Appearances and goals by club, season and competition
Club	Season	League			Cup		Continental		Other		Total	
Club	Season	Division	Apps	Goals	Apps	Goals	Apps	Goals	Apps	Goals	Apps	Goals
Montevideo City Torque	2020	UPD	8	0	—		—		—		8	0
Montevideo City Torque	2021	UPD	18	2	—		5 (Note: Appearances in Copa Sudamericana)	1	—		23	3
Montevideo City Torque	2022	UPD	21	0	1	0	0	0	—		22	0
Montevideo City Torque	2023	UPD	22	2	5	2	—		—		27	4
Montevideo City Torque	2024	USD	26	2	1	0	—		3 (Note: Appearances in playoffs)	1	30	3
Montevideo City Torque	Total		95	6	7	2	5	1	3	1	110	10
Nacional (loan)	2025	UPD	1	0	0	0	0	0	1 (Note: Appearance in Supercopa Uruguaya)	0	2	0
Liverpool Montevideo	2025	UPD	0	0	0	0	—		—		0	0
Career total			96	6	7	2	5	1	4	1	112	10

== Honours ==
Nacional

- Supercopa Uruguaya: 2025
- Torneo Competencia: 2024
