= Ygor Vinhas =

Brazilian footballer

Personal information
- Full name: Ygor Vinhas Oliveira Lima
- Date of birth: 15 April 1994 (age 32)
- Place of birth: Paracatu, Brazil
- Height: 1.92 m (6 ft 4 in)
- Position: Goalkeeper

Team information
- Current team: Remo

Youth career
- 2011: Paulista
- 2012–2015: Grêmio

Senior career*
Years	Team	Apps	(Gls)
2015	Grêmio	0	(0)
2015	→ Paulista (loan)	17	(0)
2016	Ferroviária	1	(0)
2017	Capivariano	14	(0)
2017	São Caetano	0	(0)
2018	Mirassol	11	(0)
2018–2022	Ponte Preta	74	(0)
2023	Água Santa	12	(0)
2023	Avaí	15	(0)
2024–	Água Santa	38	(0)
2024	→ Londrina (loan)	0	(0)
2025–	→ Remo (loan)	3	(0)
- * Club domestic league appearances and goals as of 15 December 2025

Ygor Vinhas Oliveira Lima (born 15 April 1994), simply known as Ygor Vinhas, is a Brazilian professional footballer who plays as a goalkeeper for Remo, on loan from Água Santa.

== Career ==
Ygor Vinhas played in the youth teams of Paulista and Grêmio, in addition to defending Ferroviária, Capivariano, São Caetano, Mirassol and Ponte Preta, where he stayed for five seasons. In 2023 it was announced by Água Santa, being one of the highlights of the club's runner-up campaign in the 2023 Campeonato Paulista. In March he signed for two years with Avaí FC, but in December 2023 he terminated his contract with the club, returning to Água Santa for 2024. After being loaned to Londrina in 2024, he was loaned to Remo in 2025.
