= Rafael Monti =

Argentine professional footballer (born 1999)

Personal information
- Full name: Rafael Monti Azpiazú
- Date of birth: 8 December 1999 (age 26)
- Place of birth: Buenos Aires, Argentina
- Position: Forward

Team information
- Current team: Remo (on loan from Vinotinto Ecuador)

Youth career
- –2019: Acassuso

Senior career*
| Years | Team | Apps | (Gls) |
| 2019 | Acassuso | 1 | (0) |
| 2020 | La Jonquera | 0 | (0) |
| 2020–2021 | Llagostera | 0 | (0) |
| 2021–2022 | L'Escala | 0 | (0) |
| 2022–2023 | Muñiz | 0 | (0) |
| 2023–2024 | Fénix | 48 | (6) |
| 2024– | Vinotinto Ecuador | 35 | (18) |
| 2026– | → Remo (loan) | 0 | (0) |
- * Club domestic league appearances and goals as of 22 January 2026

Rafael Monti Azpiazú (born 8 December 1999) is an Argentine professional footballer who plays as a forward for Campeonato Brasileiro Série A club Remo, on loan from Vinotinto Ecuador.

== Career ==
Monti's career began with Acassuso, initially in their youth system. He made his bow at first-team level on 24 April 2019 under manager Alejandro Friederich, who selected him off the substitutes bench during a Copa Argentina defeat to Colón of the Primera División; replacing Esteban Pipino at the Estadio Alfredo Beranger.

== Personal life ==
Lorenzo Monti is Rafael's brother, he is also a professional footballer who started his career in the ranks of Acassuso.

== Career statistics ==
As of 2 June 2025.

Appearances and goals by club, season and competition
| Club | Division | League | | | Cup | | Continental | | Total | |
| Club | Division | Season | Apps | Goals | Apps | Goals | Apps | Goals | Apps | Goals |
|---|---|---|---|---|---|---|---|---|---|---|
| Acassuso | Primera B Metropolitana | 2018-19 | 1 | 0 | 1 | 0 | — | | 2 | 0 |
| Fénix | Primera B Metropolitana | 2023 | 28 | 3 | — | | — | | 28 | 3 |
| Fénix | Primera B Metropolitana | 2024 | 20 | 3 | — | | — | | 20 | 3 |
| Fénix | Total | | 48 | 6 | 0 | 0 | 0 | 0 | 48 | 6 |
| Cuniburo | Ecuadorian Serie B | 2024 | 17 | 12 | 2 | 0 | — | | 19 | 12 |
| Vinotinto Ecuador | Ecuadorian Serie A | 2025 | 15 | 10 | 0 | 0 | — | | 15 | 10 |
| Career total | | | 81 | 28 | 3 | 0 | 0 | 0 | 84 | 28 |
