= Kayky Almeida =

Brazilian footballer (born 2005)

Personal information
- Full name: Kayky Henrique Almeida Brandão
- Date of birth: 1 May 2005 (age 21)
- Place of birth: Brazil
- Height: 1.85 m (6 ft 1 in)
- Position: Centre-back

Team information
- Current team: Sport Recife (on loan from Fluminense)
- Number: 33

Youth career
- Fluminense

Senior career*
Years	Team	Apps	(Gls)
2024	Fluminense	1	(0)
2024–2025	Watford	0	(0)
2025–	Fluminense	0	(0)
2025–2026	→ Remo (loan)	28	(0)
2026–	→ Sport Recife (loan)	9	(0)

International career
2024-	Brazil U20	?	(?)
- * Club domestic league appearances and goals as of 16 November 2026

Kayky Henrique Almeida Brandão da Silva (born 1 May 2005) is a Brazilian professional footballer who currently plays as a centre-back for Brazilian club Sport Recife, on loan from Fluminense.

== Club career ==
=== Fluminense ===
Almeida was a youth product of Fluminense and was a frequent player for their U20's team scoring three goals over two seasons. On 21 January 2024, Almeida made his senior debut for the club in the Campeonato Carioca against Portuguesa coming on as a substitute in additional time.

=== Watford ===
On 8 August 2024, Almeida signed for English club Watford, on a five-year deal.

Return to Fluminense

In January 2025, after having difficulties to adapt to life in England, Kayky returned to his former club Fluminense for free, and Watford kept 50% of the player’s rights to a future transfer.

Kayky will play for the club’s U-20 squad.

== Career statistics ==
As of 21 January 2024

Appearances and goals by club, season and competition
Club	Season	League			National Cup		League Cup		Other (Note: Includes Campeonato Carioca)		Total	
Club	Season	Division	Apps	Goals	Apps	Goals	Apps	Goals	Apps	Goals	Apps	Goals
Fluminense	2024	Série A	0	0	0	0	0	0	1	0	1	0
Watford	2024–25	Championship	0	0	0	0	0	0	0	0	0	0
Career total			0	0	0	0	0	0	1	0	1	0

== Honours ==
=== Fluminense ===
- Copa Libertadores: 2023
