= Leonel Picco =

Argentine footballer (born 1998)

Personal information
- Full name: Leonel Marcelo Picco
- Date of birth: 22 October 1998 (age 28)
- Place of birth: Wilde, Argentina
- Height: 1.92 m (6 ft 4 in)
- Position: Midfielder

Team information
- Current team: Remo
- Number: 14

Youth career
- Arsenal de Sarandí

Senior career*
Years	Team	Apps	(Gls)
2019–2022	Arsenal de Sarandí	56	(2)
2022–2025	Colón	28	(0)
2023–2024	→ Platense (loan)	48	(0)
2025–2026	Platense	31	(0)
2026–	Remo	12	(1)
- * Club domestic league appearances and goals as of 9 April 2026

Leonel Marcelo Picco (born 22 October 1998) is an Argentine professional footballer who plays as a midfielder for Remo.

== Career ==
Picco's career started with Arsenal de Sarandí. He made the move into senior football with the club during the 2018–19 campaign, coming off the substitutes bench for his professional bow on 1 March 2019 as Arsenal drew away from home to Central Córdoba in Primera B Nacional.

In July 2022, Picco joined Club Atlético Colón on a deal until the end of 2025. In September 2023, Picco was loaned out to Platense until the end of 2024.

== Career statistics ==
As of 2 July 2023.

Club	Division	Season	League		Cup		Continental		Total	
Club	Division	Season	Apps	Goals	Apps	Goals	Apps	Goals	Apps	Goals
Arsenal de Sarandí
Arsenal de Sarandí	Primera B Nacional	2018-19	1	0	0	0	-	-	1	0
Arsenal de Sarandí	Primera División	2019-20	2	0	0	0	-	-	2	0
Arsenal de Sarandí	Primera División	2020	-	-	9	0	-	-	9	0
Arsenal de Sarandí	Primera División	2021	21	1	11	0	8	0	40	1
Arsenal de Sarandí	Primera División	2022	6	1	7	0	-	-	13	1
Arsenal de Sarandí	Total		30	2	27	0	8	0	65	2
Colón
Colón	Primera División	2022	17	0	-	-	-	-	17	0
Colón	Primera División	2023	10	0	1	0	-	-	11	0
Colón	Total		27	0	1	0	-	-	28	0
Career total			57	2	28	0	8	0	93	2

== Honours ==
Platense

- Argentine Primera División: 2025 Apertura
