= Matheus Felipe =

Brazilian footballer

Personal information
- Full name: Matheus Felipe Santos Nascimento
- Date of birth: 9 November 1998 (age 28)
- Place of birth: Teresina, Brazil
- Height: 1.86 m (6 ft 1 in)
- Position: Center-back

Team information
- Current team: Cong An Ho Chi Minh City
- Number: 4

Youth career
- 2014–2018: Mirassol

Senior career*
Years	Team	Apps	(Gls)
2016–2019	Mirassol	7	(0)
2020–2021	Grêmio Prudente	13	(1)
2020–2021	→ Juventus Jaraguá (loan)	8	(0)
2021	→ CSA (loan)	39	(1)
2022–2025	Athletico Paranaense	33	(2)
2024–2025	→ Ceará (loan)	29	(1)
2025–	Cong An Ho Chi Minh City	22	(0)
- * Club domestic league appearances and goals as of 7 June 2026

Matheus Felipe Santos Nascimento (born 9 November 1998), known as Matheus Felipe, is a Brazilian professional footballer who plays as a center-back for Serie A club Remo

== Club career ==
Born in Teresina, Piauí, Matheus Felipe joined Mirassol's youth setup in 2014, aged 15. Known as Matheus Piauí at the time, he made his senior debut on 23 July 2017, coming on as a second-half substitute in a 0–1 away loss against Penapolense, for the year's Copa Paulista.

On 4 February 2020, Matheus Felipe moved to Campeonato Paulista Segunda Divisão side Grêmio Prudente. Later in the year, he moved on loan to Juventus de Jaraguá, playing in the 2020 Copa Santa Catarina and the 2021 Campeonato Catarinense.

On 7 April 2021, still owned by Prudente, Matheus Felipe signed for Série B side CSA until the end of the year. He immediately became a starter for his new side, only missing out two league matches due to suspension as his side narrowly missed out on promotion.

On 3 December 2021, Matheus Felipe signed a five-year contract with Athletico Paranaense for the 2022 campaign.

== Career statistics ==
As of 28 February 2023

Club	Season	League			State League		Cup		Continental		Other		Total	
Club	Season	Division	Apps	Goals	Apps	Goals	Apps	Goals	Apps	Goals	Apps	Goals	Apps	Goals
Mirassol	2016	Paulista A2	—		0	0	—		—		4 (Note: Appearance(s) in Copa Paulista)	0	4	0
Mirassol	2017	Paulista	—		0	0	—		—		16	1	16	1
Mirassol	2018	Série D	3	0	0	0	—		—		12	0	12	0
Mirassol	2019	Paulista	—		4	0	—		—		8	0	12	0
Mirassol	Total		3	0	4	0	—		—		40	1	47	1
Grêmio Prudente	2020	Paulista 2ª Divisão	—		13	1	—		—		—		13	1
Juventus de Jaraguá	2020	Catarinense	—		0	0	—		—		5 (Note: Appearance(s) in Copa Santa Catarina)	0	5	0
Juventus de Jaraguá	2021	Série D	0	0	8	0	—		—		—		8	0
Juventus de Jaraguá	Total		0	0	8	0	—		—		5	0	13	0
CSA	2021	Série B	36	1	3	0	1	0	—		2 (Note: Appearance(s) in Copa do Nordeste)	0	42	1
Athletico Paranaense	2022	Série A	23	2	5	0	4	0	5 (Note: Appearance(s) in Copa Libertadores)	0	0	0	37	2
Athletico Paranaense	2023	Série A	0	0	5	0	0	0	0	0	—		5	0
Athletico Paranaense	Total		23	2	10	0	4	0	5	0	0	0	42	2
Career total			62	3	38	1	5	0	5	0	47	1	157	5

== Honours ==
CSA

- Campeonato Alagoano: 2021

Athletico Paranaense

- Campeonato Paranaense: 2023

Ceará

- Campeonato Cearense: 2024

Cong An Ho Chi Minh City

- Vietnamese Cup: 2025–26
