= Léo Andrade =

Brazilian footballer (born 1998)

Personal information
- Full name: Leonardo de Andrade Silva
- Date of birth: 18 April 1998 (age 28)
- Place of birth: Curitiba, Brazil
- Height: 1.90 m (6 ft 3 in)
- Position: Centre-back

Team information
- Current team: Remo
- Number: 5

Youth career
- 2011–2017: Coritiba

Senior career*
Years	Team	Apps	(Gls)
2017–2019	Coritiba	7	(0)
2019	→ Juventude (loan)	0	(0)
2019–2020	Marítimo B	19	(2)
2020–2023	Marítimo	54	(2)
2023–2024	Khimki	21	(0)
2024–2025	Lamia	14	(0)
2025	Suwon Samsung Bluewings	29	(2)
2026–	Remo	6	(0)
- * Club domestic league appearances and goals as of 9 April 2026

Leonardo "Léo" de Andrade Silva (born 18 April 1998) is a Brazilian professional footballer who plays as a centre-back for Campeonato Brasileiro Série A club Remo.

== Career ==
Andrade made his professional debut with Coritiba in a 1-0 Campeonato Paranaense win over União on 28 January 2018. On 31 July 2019, Andrade joined Marítimo.

On 27 January 2023, Marítimo announced Andrade's transfer to the Russian club Khimki. Khimki announced a year-and-a-half-long contract with Andrade on 9 February 2023.

On 13 June 2024, Andrade signed with Lamia in Greece. He was released from his Lamia contract by mutual consent on 13 January 2025.

== Career statistics ==
As of 25 May 2024

Club	Season	League			Cup		Continental		Other		Total	
Club	Season	Division	Apps	Goals	Apps	Goals	Apps	Goals	Apps	Goals	Apps	Goals
Coritiba	2017	Série A	0	0	–		–		–		0	0
Coritiba	2018	Série B	0	0	3	0	–		7 (Note: Appearances in the Campeonato Paranaense)	0	10	0
Coritiba	Total		0	0	3	0	0	0	7	0	10	0
Juventude (loan)	2019	Campeonato Gaúcho	–		0	0	–		0	0	0	0
Marítimo B	2019–20	Campeonato de Portugal	18	2	–		–		–		18	2
Marítimo B	2020–21	Campeonato de Portugal	1	0	–		–		–		1	0
Marítimo B	Total		19	2	0	0	0	0	0	0	19	2
Marítimo	2020–21	Primeira Liga	21	1	3	1	–		–		24	2
Marítimo	2021–22	Primeira Liga	21	0	1	0	–		0	0	22	0
Marítimo	2022–23	Primeira Liga	12	1	1	0	–		0	0	13	1
Marítimo	Total		54	2	5	1	0	0	0	0	59	3
Khimki	2022–23	Russian Premier League	12	0	0	0	–		–		12	0
Khimki	2023–24	Russian First League	9	0	2	0	–		–		11	0
Khimki	Total		21	0	2	0	0	0	0	0	23	0
Career total			94	4	10	1	0	0	7	0	111	5

== Honours ==
Remo

- Super Copa Grão-Pará: 2026
