= Thalisson Gabriel =

Brazilian footballer

Personal information
- Full name: Thalisson Gabriel Pereira Moreira
- Date of birth: 20 January 2002 (age 24)
- Place of birth: Bauru, Brazil
- Height: 1.90 m (6 ft 3 in)
- Position: Centre back

Team information
- Current team: Ceará (on loan from Coritiba)
- Number: 3

Youth career
- 2016–2017: Grêmio
- 2018–2022: Coritiba

Senior career*
| Years | Team | Apps | (Gls) |
| 2021– | Coritiba | 40 | (2) |
| 2023 | → Camboriú (loan) | 12 | (1) |
| 2025 | → Paysandu (loan) | 22 | (1) |
| 2026 | → Remo (loan) | 5 | (1) |
| 2026– | → Ceará (loan) | 2 | (0) |
- * Club domestic league appearances and goals as of 18 November 2026

Thalisson Gabriel Pereira Moreira (born 20 January 2002), known as Thalisson Gabriel or just Thalisson, is a Brazilian footballer who plays as a central defender for Ceará, on loan from Coritiba.

== Career ==
Born in Bauru, São Paulo, Thalisson joined Coritiba's youth setup in 2018, from Grêmio. He made his first team debut on 18 March 2021, coming on as a first-half substitute for injured Henrique Vermudt in a 1–0 away win over União Rondonópolis, for the year's Copa do Brasil.

On 23 September 2021, after being back to the under-20 squad, Thalisson renewed his contract with Coxa until October 2025. In January 2023, he was close to a move to English side Norwich City, but the move did not materialize as he was unable to receive a work permit.

On 11 April 2023, Thalisson was loaned to Série D side Camboriú for the remainder of the year. A regular starter, he was recalled by Coritiba on 2 August, and made his Série A debut on 19 October, starting in a 3–0 home loss to Cuiabá.

== Career statistics ==
As of 26 October 2023

| Club | Season | League | | | State League | | Cup | | Continental | | Other | | Total | |
| Club | Season | Division | Apps | Goals | Apps | Goals | Apps | Goals | Apps | Goals | Apps | Goals | Apps | Goals |
|---|---|---|---|---|---|---|---|---|---|---|---|---|---|---|
| Coritiba | 2021 | Série B | 0 | 0 | 0 | 0 | 1 | 0 | — | | — | | 1 | 0 |
| Coritiba | 2022 | Série A | 0 | 0 | 2 | 0 | 0 | 0 | — | | — | | 2 | 0 |
| Coritiba | 2023 | Série A | 2 | 0 | 0 | 0 | 0 | 0 | — | | — | | 2 | 0 |
| Coritiba | Total | | 2 | 0 | 2 | 0 | 1 | 0 | — | | — | | 5 | 0 |
| Camboriú (loan) | 2023 | Série D | 12 | 1 | — | | — | | — | | — | | 12 | 1 |
| Career total | | | 14 | 1 | 2 | 0 | 1 | 0 | 0 | 0 | 0 | 0 | 17 | 1 |

== Honours ==
Coritiba

- Copa do Brasil Sub-20: 2021
- Campeonato Paranaense: 2022

Remo

- Super Copa Grão-Pará: 2026
