= João Lucas (footballer, born 1998) =

Brazilian footballer

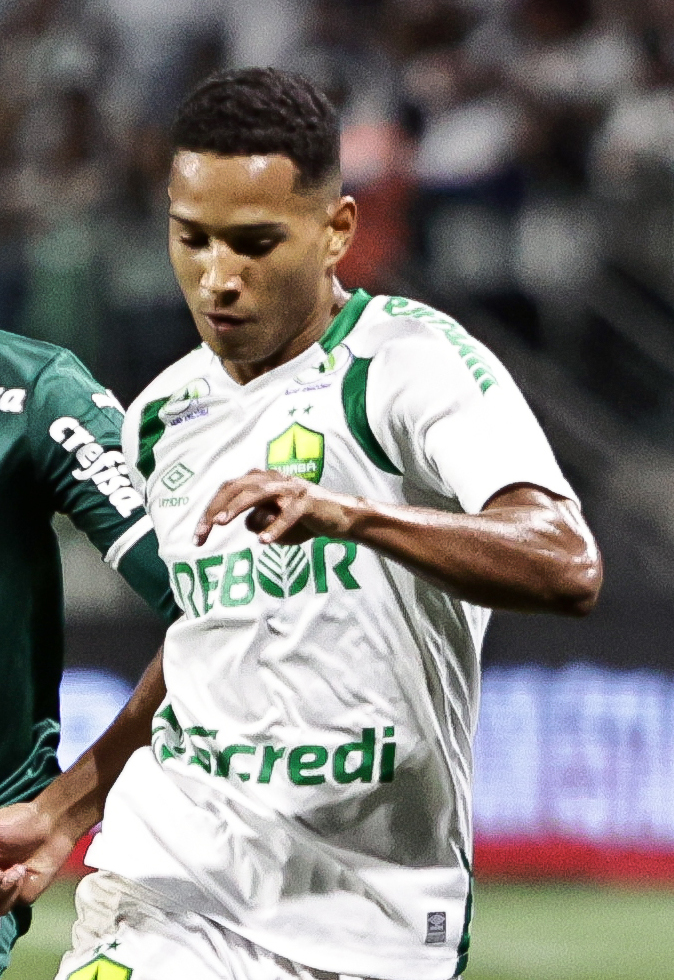
- João Lucas with Cuiabá in 2022

Personal information
- Full name: João Lucas de Almeida Carvalho
- Date of birth: 9 March 1998 (age 28)
- Place of birth: Belo Horizonte, Brazil
- Height: 1.81 m (5 ft 11 in)
- Position: Right back

Team information
- Current team: Remo

Youth career
- 2015: Villa Nova
- 2016–2018: Goiás

Senior career*
Years	Team	Apps	(Gls)
2019	Bangu	8	(0)
2019–2021	Flamengo	18	(1)
2021	→ Cuiabá (loan)	34	(0)
2022	Cuiabá	42	(1)
2023–2024	Santos	26	(0)
2024	→ Juventude (loan)	43	(2)
2025	Grêmio	17	(0)
2026–	Remo	10	(0)

International career
2017	Brazil (University)	5	(0)
- * Club domestic league appearances and goals as of 9 April 2026

João Lucas de Almeida Carvalho (born 9 March 1998), known as João Lucas, is a Brazilian footballer who currently plays as a right back for Remo.

== Club career ==
=== Early career ===
Born in Belo Horizonte, Minas Gerais, João Lucas had failed trials at Atlético Mineiro and Cruzeiro before joining Villa Nova's youth setup in 2015. In 2016, he moved to Goiás, initially joining the under-17 team.

Ahead of the 2019 season, João Lucas signed for Bangu. He made his senior debut on 22 February of that year, starting in a 2–0 Campeonato Carioca home loss against Fluminense.

=== Flamengo ===
On 9 May 2019, Flamengo signed João Lucas from Bangu for an undisclosed fee. Initially a backup to Rafinha, he made his club – and Série A – debut on 12 June, replacing Rodinei late into a 2–0 away win over CSA.

João Lucas scored his first goal for Flamengo on 25 January 2020, netting the equalizer in a 3–2 home win over Volta Redonda. However, he lost space after the arrival of Mauricio Isla and the proeminence of Matheuzinho.

=== Cuiabá ===
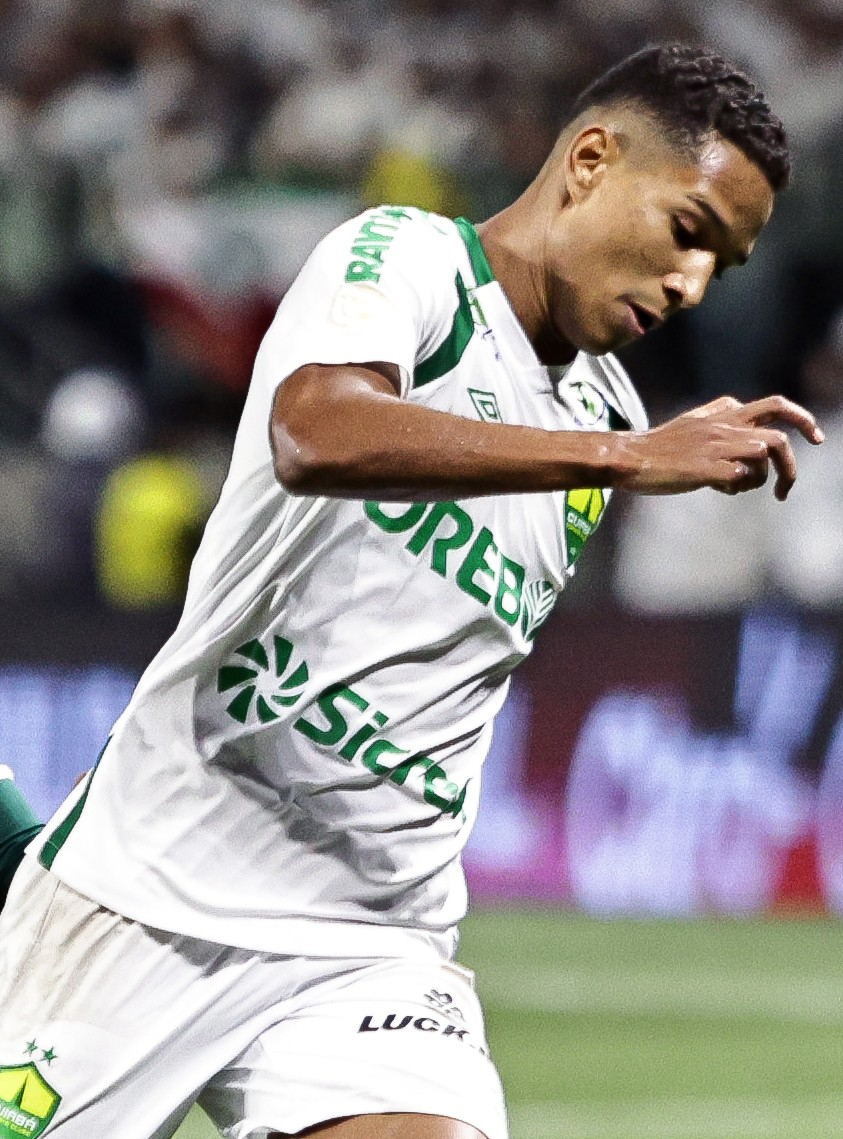
João Lucas with Cuiabá in 2022

On 4 May 2021, João Lucas was loaned to top tier newcomers Cuiabá until the end of the year. An undisputed starter, he signed a permanent four-year deal with the club on 31 December.

=== Santos ===
On 9 December 2022, Santos announced the signing of João Lucas on a three-year contract. He made his debut for the club the following 14 January, starting in a 2–1 Campeonato Paulista home win over Mirassol.

==== Loan to Juventude ====
On 9 January 2024, Santos announced the loan of João Lucas to Juventude until the end of the year. He was a regular starter for the side, contributed with two goals in 49 appearances as they avoided relegation.

=== Grêmio ===
On 7 January 2025, Grêmio announced an agreement with João Lucas for a three-year contract, subject to medical examinations.

== Career statistics ==
=== Club ===
As of 20 December 2024.

Club	Season	League			State League		Cup		Continental		Other		Total	
Club	Season	Division	Apps	Goals	Apps	Goals	Apps	Goals	Apps	Goals	Apps	Goals	Apps	Goals
Bangu	2019	Carioca	—		8 (Note: Appearance(s) in the Campeonato Carioca.)	0	0	0	—		—		8	0
Flamengo	2019	Série A	6	0	—		0	0	0	0	—		6	0
Flamengo	2020	Série A	5	0	5	1	0	0	1 (Note: Appearance(s) in Copa Libertadores.)	0	0	0	11	1
Flamengo	2021	Série A	0	0	2	0	0	0	0	0	—		2	0
Flamengo	Total		11	0	7	1	0	0	1	0	0	0	19	1
Cuiabá	2021	Série A	34	0	—		—		—		—		34	0
Cuiabá	2022	Série A	31	0	11 (Note: Appearance(s) in the Campeonato Mato-Grossense.)	1	4	0	4 (Note: Appearance(s) in Copa Sudamericana.)	0	—		50	1
Cuiabá	Total		65	0	11	1	4	0	4	0	—		84	1
Santos	2023	Série A	15	0	11 (Note: Appearance(s) in the Campeonato Paulista.)	0	3	0	1	0	—		30	0
Juventude (loan)	2024	Série A	30	1	13 (Note: Appearance(s) in the Campeonato Gaúcho.)	1	6	0	—		—		49	2
Career total			121	1	50	3	13	0	6	0	0	0	190	4

== Honours ==
Flamengo

- Copa Libertadores: 2019
- Recopa Sudamericana: 2020
- Campeonato Brasileiro Série A: 2019, 2020
- Supercopa do Brasil: 2020, 2021
- Campeonato Carioca: 2020

Cuiabá

- Campeonato Mato-Grossense: 2022

Remo

- Super Copa Grão-Pará: 2026
