= Zé Ricardo (footballer, born 1999) =

Brazilian footballer

Personal information
- Full name: José Ricardo Araújo Fernandes
- Date of birth: 3 February 1999 (age 27)
- Place of birth: Rio de Janeiro, Brazil
- Height: 1.80 m (5 ft 11 in)
- Position: Midfielder

Team information
- Current team: Remo
- Number: 55

Youth career
- 2014–2018: Fluminense

Senior career*
Years	Team	Apps	(Gls)
2019–2020	Fluminense	2	(0)
2020	→ Boavista (loan)	1	(0)
2021	Londrina	2	(0)
2021	Boavista	4	(0)
2022–2023	Tombense	46	(2)
2023	→ Goiás (loan)	26	(1)
2024	Kawasaki Frontale	11	(0)
2025	Shonan Bellmare	7	(0)
2026–	Remo	13	(0)
- * Club domestic league appearances and goals as of 9 April 2026

José Ricardo Araújo Fernandes (born 3 February 1999), commonly known as Zé Ricardo, is a Brazilian footballer who plays as a midfielder and currently plays for Remo.

== Career ==
On 5 January 2024, Zé Ricardo abroad to Japan for the first time and joined to J1 club, Kawasaki Frontale for 2024 season. Zé Ricardo was brought his club secure champions of Japanese Super Cup in 2024 after defeat J1 champions, Vissel Kobe narrowly 1-0.

On 4 January 2025, after leaving at Kawasaki, Zé Ricardo joined to fellow J1 club, Shonan Bellmare for 2025 season.

== Career statistics ==
=== Club ===
As of the start from 2025 season.

Club	Season	League			State League		Cup		League Cup		Continental		Other		Total	
Club	Season	Division	Apps	Goals	Apps	Goals	Apps	Goals	Apps	Goals	Apps	Goals	Apps	Goals	Apps	Goals
Fluminense	2019	Série A	0	0	2	0	0	0	–		0	0	—		2	0
Boavista (loan)	2020	Carioca	—		1	0	0	0	–		—		—		1	0
Londrina	2021	Série B	0	0	2	0	—		–		—		—		2	0
Boavista	2021	Série D	4	0	—		—		–		—		1 (Note: Appearance(s) in Copa Rio)	0	5	0
Tombense	2022	Série B	34	2	7	0	2	0	–		—		—		43	2
Goiás	2023	Série A	13	0	13	1	2 (Note: Appearance(s) in Copa do Brasil)	0	–		5 (Note: Appearance(s) in Conmebol Sudamericana)	0	5 (Note: Appearance(s) in Copa Verde)	0	37	1
Tombense	2023	Série B	5	0	0	0	0	0	–		0	0	—		5	0
Kawasaki Frontale	2024	J1 League	11	0	–		2 (Note: Appearance(s) in Emperor's Cup)	0	–		0	0	1 (Note: Appearance(s) in Fujifilm Super Cup)	0	14	0
Shonan Bellmare	2025	J1 League	0	0	–		0	0	0	0	–				0	0
Career total			67	2	25	1	2	0	0	0	5	0	2	0	101	3

== Honours ==
=== Club ===
Goiás

- Copa Verde: 2023

Kawasaki Frontale

- Japanese Super Cup: 2024

Remo

- Super Copa Grão-Pará: 2026
