= 2025 Copa Verde finals =

- Event: 2025 Copa Verde
Paysandu	Goiás
(Pará)	(Goiás)
1	1
- on aggregate Paysandu won 5–4 on penalties

First leg
Paysandu	Goiás
0	0
- Date: 9 April 2025
- Venue: Mangueirão, Belém
- Referee: Alisson Sidnei Furtado
- Attendance: 32,997

Second leg
Goiás	Paysandu
1	1
- Date: 23 April 2025
- Venue: Estádio Serra Dourada, Goiânia
- Referee: Davi de Oliveira Lacerda
- Attendance: 38,412

The 2025 Copa Verde finals was the final two-legged tie that decided the 2025 Copa Verde, the 12th season of the Copa Verde, Brazil's regional cup football tournament organised by the Brazilian Football Confederation.

The finals were contested in a two-legged home-and-away format between Paysandu, from Pará, and Goiás, from Goiás.

The first leg ended in a scoreless draw, while the second leg ended in a 1–1 draw, which meant the title was decided by a penalty shoot-out. Paysandu won 5–4 to claim their 5th Copa Verde title.

== Teams ==
Team	Previous finals appearances (bold indicates winners)
(Pará) Paysandu	8 (2014, **2016**, 2017, **2018**, 2019, **2022**, 2023, **2024**)
Goiás	1 (**2023**)

=== Road to the final ===
Note: In all scores below, the score of the finalist is given first.

(Pará) Paysandu			Round	Goiás		
Opponent	Venue	Score		Opponent	Venue	Score
Bye			First round	Bye		
(Rondônia) Porto Velho	Home	1–1 (5–4 p)	Round of 16	(Espírito Santo) Rio Branco	Home	6–0
(Amazonas (Brazilian state)) Manaus (won 4–1 on aggregate)	Home	0–0	Quarter-finals	(Mato Grosso) União Rondonópolis (won 5–0 on aggregate)	Away	2–0
(Amazonas (Brazilian state)) Manaus (won 4–1 on aggregate)	Away	4–1	Quarter-finals	(Mato Grosso) União Rondonópolis (won 5–0 on aggregate)	Home	3–0
(Roraima) São Raimundo (won 5–2 on aggregate)	Away	2–2	Semi-finals	(Federal District (Brazil)) Brasiliense (tied 3–3 on aggregate, won 5–4 on penalties)	Away	3–3
(Roraima) São Raimundo (won 5–2 on aggregate)	Home	3–0	Semi-finals	(Federal District (Brazil)) Brasiliense (tied 3–3 on aggregate, won 5–4 on penalties)	Home	0–0

== Format ==
The finals were played on a home-and-away two-legged basis. If tied on aggregate, the penalty shoot-out was used to determine the winner.

== Matches ==
=== First leg ===
9 April 2025
20:00 BRT (UTC−3)

Paysandu (Pará)	0–0	Goiás
	Report

Mangueirão, Belém
Attendance: 32,997
Referee: Alisson Sidnei Furtado (Tocantins)

**Paysandu**	**Goiás**

GK	13	(Brazil) Matheus Nogueira
DF	2	(Brazil) Edílson		(substituted off) 74'
DF	4	(Brazil) Luan Freitas
DF	3	(Uruguay) Yeferson Quintana
DF	27	(Paraguay) Ramón Martínez
DF	94	(Brazil) PK
MF	28	(Brazil) Leandro Vilela		(substituted off) 3'
MF	20	(Brazil) Marlon		(substituted off) 74'
FW	77	(Brazil) Rossi	(yellow card) 11'
FW	17	(Paraguay) Pedro Delvalle		(substituted off) 56'
FW	11	(Brazil) Nicolas (c)		(substituted off) 56'
Substitutes:
GK	31	(Brazil) Iago Hass
DF	5	(Argentina) Joaquín Novillo
DF	21	(Brazil) Bryan		(substituted on) 74'
DF	34	(Brazil) Lucca
MF	6	(Ecuador) Joseph Espinoza
MF	10	(Brazil) Giovanni		(substituted on) 56'
MF	96	(Brazil) Matheus Vargas		(substituted on) 3'
FW	9	(Paraguay) Jorge Benítez		(substituted on) 56'
FW	24	(Argentina) Benjamín Borasi
FW	30	(Brazil) Marcelinho
FW	32	(Chile) Matías Cavalleri		(substituted on) 74'
Coach:
(Brazil) Luizinho Lopes

GK	23	(Brazil) Tadeu (c)
DF	97	(Brazil) Willean Lepo	(yellow card) 46'	(substituted off) 62'
DF	75	(Brazil) Messias
DF	14	(Brazil) Lucas Ribeiro
DF	36	(Brazil) Lucas Lovat	(yellow card) 20'	(substituted off) 46'
MF	28	(Brazil) Juninho
MF	32	(Brazil) Rodrigo Andrade		(substituted off) 46'
MF	77	(Brazil) Marcão
FW	7	(Brazil) Jajá		(substituted off) 62'
FW	45	(Brazil) Arthur Caíke		(substituted off) 66'
FW	71	(Brazil) Zé Hugo
Substitutes:
GK	1	(Brazil) Thiago Rodrigues
GK	12	(Brazil) Ezequiel
DF	3	(Brazil) Luiz Felipe
DF	4	(Brazil) Anthony
DF	6	(Brazil) DG		(substituted on) 46'
DF	20	(Brazil) Diego Caito		(substituted on) 62'
MF	5	(Uruguay) Gonzalo Freitas
MF	8	(Brazil) Rafael Gava		(substituted on) 46'
MF	16	(Brazil) Aloísio
MF	22	(Brazil) Vitinho
FW	30	(Brazil) Welliton Matheus		(substituted on) 62'
FW	31	(Uruguay) Facundo Barceló		(substituted on) 66'
Coach:
(Brazil) Vagner Mancini

Assistant referees:
Anne Kesy Gomes de Sá (Amazonas)
Cipriano da Silva Sousa (Tocantins)
Fourth official:
Marcos Mateus Pereira (Mato Grosso do Sul)
Fifth official:
Márcio Gleidson Correia Dias (Pará)
Video assistant referee:
Rodrigo Batista Raposo (Distrito Federal)
Assistant video assistant referee:
Ciro Chaban Junqueira (Distrito Federal)

=== Second leg ===
23 April 2025
21:00 BRT (UTC−3)

Goiás	1–1	(Pará) Paysandu
Welliton Matheus 25'	Report	Cavalleri 90+4'
Penalties
Tadeu (penalty scored); Arthur Caíke (penalty scored); DG (penalty scored); Freitas (penalty missed); Messias (penalty scored); Marcão (penalty missed)	4–5	(penalty missed) Rossi; (penalty scored) Giovanni; (penalty scored) Marlon; (penalty scored) Cavalleri; (penalty scored) Nicolas; (penalty scored) Leandro Vilela

Estádio Serra Dourada, Goiânia
Attendance: 38,412
Referee: Davi de Oliveira Lacerda (Espírito Santo)

**Goiás**	**Paysandu**

GK	23	(Brazil) Tadeu (c)	(yellow card) 81'
DF	20	(Brazil) Diego Caito		(substituted off) 73'
DF	75	(Brazil) Messias
DF	14	(Brazil) Lucas Ribeiro
DF	36	(Brazil) Lucas Lovat		(substituted off) 73'
MF	77	(Brazil) Marcão	(yellow card) 41'
MF	28	(Brazil) Juninho
MF	8	(Brazil) Rafael Gava		(substituted off) 87'
FW	30	(Brazil) Welliton Matheus		(substituted off) 78'
FW	45	(Brazil) Arthur Caíke
FW	17	(Brazil) Pedrinho		(substituted off) 73'
Substitutes:
GK	1	(Brazil) Thiago Rodrigues
GK	12	(Brazil) Ezequiel
DF	3	(Brazil) Luiz Felipe
DF	4	(Brazil) Anthony
DF	6	(Brazil) DG		(substituted on) 73'
DF	97	(Brazil) Willean Lepo		(substituted on) 73'
MF	5	(Uruguay) Gonzalo Freitas		(substituted on) 87'
MF	22	(Brazil) Vitinho
MF	25	(Brazil) Lucas Rodrigues
MF	32	(Brazil) Rodrigo Andrade
FW	7	(Brazil) Jajá		(substituted on) 78'
FW	71	(Brazil) Zé Hugo		(substituted on) 73'
Coach:
(Brazil) Vagner Mancini

GK	13	(Brazil) Matheus Nogueira
DF	21	(Brazil) Bryan		(substituted off) 56'
DF	4	(Brazil) Luan Freitas
DF	5	(Argentina) Joaquín Novillo
DF	94	(Brazil) PK		(substituted off) 85'
MF	27	(Paraguay) Ramón Martínez	(yellow card) 66'
MF	28	(Brazil) Leandro Vilela
MF	96	(Brazil) Matheus Vargas	(yellow card) 18'	(substituted off) 56'
FW	77	(Brazil) Rossi (c)
FW	24	(Argentina) Benjamín Borasi	(yellow card) 58'	(substituted off) 76'
FW	9	(Paraguay) Jorge Benítez	(yellow card) 52'	(substituted off) 76'
Substitutes:
GK	31	(Brazil) Iago Hass
DF	2	(Brazil) Edílson		(substituted on) 56'
DF	34	(Brazil) Lucca
MF	6	(Ecuador) Joseph Espinoza
MF	10	(Brazil) Giovanni		(substituted on) 76'
FW	11	(Brazil) Nicolas		(substituted on) 56'
FW	17	(Paraguay) Pedro Delvalle
FW	20	(Brazil) Marlon		(substituted on) 76'
FW	30	(Brazil) Marcelinho
FW	32	(Chile) Matías Cavalleri		(substituted on) 85'
Coach:
(Brazil) Luizinho Lopes

Assistant referees:
Eduardo Gonçalves da Cruz (Mato Grosso do Sul)
Douglas Pagung (Espírito Santo)
Fourth official:
Rodrigo da Fonseca Silva (Mato Grosso)
Fifth official:
André Luiz Severo (Goiás)
Video assistant referee:
Rodrigo Batista Raposo (Distrito Federal)
Assistant video assistant referee:
Ciro Chaban Junqueira (Distrito Federal)

== See also ==
- 2026 Copa do Brasil
