= 2025 Goiás Esporte Clube season =

Goiás Esporte Clube
2025 season
- President: Paulo Rogerio Pinheiro
- Manager: Vagner Mancini
- Stadium: Estádio da Serrinha
- Série B: 3rd
- Campeonato Goiano: Semi-finals
- Copa Verde: Runner-up
- Average home league attendance: 8,938

The 2025 season is the 82nd competitive season for Goiás Esporte Clube. The team will take part in the Campeonato Brasileiro Série B for the second consecutive season and the Campeonato Goiano.

== Squad ==
=== Current squad ===
As of 2 March 2025

Note: Flags indicate national team as defined under FIFA eligibility rules; some limited exceptions apply. Players may hold more than one non-FIFA nationality.

No.	Pos.	Nation	Player
1	GK	BRA	Thiago Rodrigues
2	DF	BRA	Diego Caito
3	DF	BRA	Luiz Felipe (on loan from Santos)
4	DF	BRA	Anthony
5	MF	URU	Gonzalo Freitas
6	DF	BRA	Douglas Teixeira (on loan from Barra-SC)
7	FW	BRA	Jajá Silva
8	MF	BRA	Rafael Gava
11	FW	BRA	Halerrandrio
12	GK	BRA	Ezequiel
14	DF	BRA	Lucas Ribeiro
15	FW	VEN	Esli García
16	MF	BRA	Aloísio
17	FW	BRA	Pedrinho
22	MF	BRA	Vitinho (on loan from Cruzeiro)

No.	Pos.	Nation	Player
23	GK	BRA	Tadeu (captain)
27	FW	BRA	Vitor Hugo
28	MF	BRA	Juninho
30	FW	BRA	Welliton Matheus (on loan from Primavera)
31	FW	URU	Facundo Barceló
32	MF	BRA	Rodrigo Andrade
36	DF	BRA	Lucas Lovat
41	GK	BRA	José Vitor
45	FW	BRA	Arthur Caíke
66	DF	BRA	Danilo
71	FW	BRA	Zé Hugo (on loan from Azuriz)
75	DF	BRA	Messias (on loan from Santos)
77	MF	BRA	Marcão
97	DF	BRA	Willean Lepo

=== Transfers In ===
Pos.	Player	Transferred from	Fee	Date	Source
MF	(Venezuela) Esli García	(Brazil) Paysandu	Undisclosed	1 January 2025	

=== Transfers Out ===
Pos.	Player	Transferred to	Fee	Date	Source
MF	(Brazil) Juninho	(Brazil) Criciúma	Free	3 January 2025	
MF	(Brazil) Jhonny Lucas	(Brazil) Ponte Preta	Free	3 January 2025	
DF	(Brazil) David Braz	(Brazil) Mirassol	Free	6 January 2025	

== Competitions ==
=== Overall record ===
Competition	First match	Last match	Starting round	Record							
Competition	First match	Last match	Starting round	Pld	W	D	L	GF	GA	GD	Win %
Série B	5 April 2025	22 November 2025	Matchday 1	0	0	0	0	0	0	+0	—
Campeonato Goiano	15 January 2025			2	0	1	1	1	2	−1	0.00
Total				2	0	1	1	1	2	−1	0.00

Last updated: 18 January 2025
Source: Competitions

=== Série B ===
==== League table ====
Pos	Team	Pld	W	D	L	GF	GA	GD	Pts	Promotion or relegation
4	Remo (P)	38	16	14	8	51	39	+12	62	Promotion to 2026 Campeonato Brasileiro Série A
5	Criciúma	38	17	10	11	47	33	+14	61	
6	Goiás	38	17	10	11	42	37	+5	61	
7	Novorizontino	38	15	15	8	43	32	+11	60	
8	CRB	38	16	8	14	45	40	+5	56	

Source: CBF
Rules for classification: 1) points; 2) wins; 3) goal difference; 4) goals scored; 5) head-to-head results (only between 2 teams); 6) fewest red cards; 7) fewest yellow cards; 8) drawing of lots.
(P) Promoted

==== Matches ====
5 April 2025 1	Goiás	1–0	Amazonas	Goiânia
19:00	Rodrigo Andrade 4'	Report		Stadium: Estádio da Serrinha

12 April 2025 2	Operário Ferroviário	1–2	Goiás	Ponta Grossa
20:00	Rodrigo 51'	Report	Arthur Caíke 84'; Diego Caito 86'	Stadium: Estádio Germano Krüger

17 April 2025 3	Goiás	2–2	Vila Nova	Goiânia
19:00	Lucas Lovat (yellow card) 5'; Arthur Caíke 27'; Thiago Rodrigues (yellow card) 60'; Messias 66'; Pedrinho (yellow card) 87'; Marcão (yellow card) 90+6'; Diego Caito (yellow card) 90+8'; Anthony (yellow card) 90+11'	Report	Facundo Labandeira 41'; Elias (yellow card) 45+8' (yellow-red card) 90+2'; Igor Henrique (yellow card) 50'; Arilson 89'	Stadium: Estádio da Serrinha; Attendance: 11,383; Referee: (Brazil) Rafael Klein

20 April 2025 4	América Mineiro	1–0	Goiás	Belo Horizonte
20:00	Miguel Terceros 13' (pen.) (yellow card) 69'	Report	Lucas Rodrigues (yellow card) 44'	Stadium: Arena Independência; Attendance: 1,704; Referee: (Brazil) Paulo Schleich Vollkopf

28 April 2025 5	Botafogo-SP	0–1	Goiás	Ribeirão Preto
19:30	Jonathan Cafú (yellow card) 26'; Alisson Cassiano (yellow card) 39'; Carlão (yellow card) 48'	Report	Lucas Ribeiro (yellow card) 18'; Lucas Lovat (yellow card) 31'; Anselmo Ramon 45'; Marcão (yellow card) 59'	Stadium: Estádio Santa Cruz; Attendance: 1,840; Referee: (Brazil) Paulo Belence Alves dos Prazeres Filho

5 May 2025 6	Goiás	2–1	Avaí	Goiânia
20:00	Messias (yellow card) 9'; Pedrinho 24'; Lucas Lovat 30'; Welliton (yellow card) 63'	Report	Jonathan Costa (yellow card) 10'; João Pedro 21'; Mário Sérgio Valério (yellow card) 27' (yellow-red card) 46'; Zé Ricardo (yellow card) 61'	Stadium: Estádio da Serrinha; Attendance: 4,911; Referee: (Brazil) Fábio Santos Sá Junior

10 May 2025 7	Goiás	1–0	Coritiba	Goiânia
19:30	Marcão (yellow card) 22'; Rafael Gava 68'	Report		Stadium: Estádio da Serrinha; Attendance: 8,465; Referee: (Brazil) Jonathan Benkenstein Pinheiro

18 May 2025 8	Paysandu	0–0	Goiás	Belém
19:30	Jorge Benítez (yellow card) 38'; Leandro Vilela (yellow card) 88'; Nícolas (yellow card) 89'	Report	Willean Lepo (yellow card) 20'; Freitas (yellow card) 49'; Jajá Silva (yellow card) 73'; Rodrigo Andrade (yellow card) 79'	Stadium: Estádio da Curuzu; Attendance: 15,159; Referee: (Brazil) Marcio Dos Santos

23 May 2025 9	Goiás	2–0	Ferroviária	Goiânia
22:30	Marcão (yellow card) 30'; Anselmo Ramon 38'; Lucas Ribeiro (yellow card) 62'; Jajá Silva 84'; Willean Lepo (yellow card) 87'; Freitas (yellow card) 90'	Report	Ricardinho (yellow card) 57'	Stadium: Estádio da Serrinha; Attendance: 7,065; Referee: (Brazil) Alisson Sidnei Furtado

31 May 2025 10	Atlético Goianiense	1–2	Goiás	Goiânia
19:30	Alix Vinicius 10'; Ruan (yellow card) 45+6'; Robert Santos (yellow card) 45+8'; Fábio Matias (yellow card) 45+8'; Guilherme Romão (yellow card) 90+4'	Report	Luiz Felipe (yellow card) 21'; Anselmo Ramon 30' (yellow card) 57'; Tadeu 45+7' (pen.) (yellow card) 45+8'; Diego Caito (yellow card) 75'	Stadium: Estádio Antônio Accioly; Attendance: 6,668; Referee: (Brazil) Flavio Rodrigues de Souza

8 June 2025 11	Goiás	2–0	Volta Redonda	Goiânia
17:00	Vitinho 21'; Diego Caito (yellow card) 45+2'; Freitas (yellow card) 45+6'; Arthur Caíke 90+4'	Report		Stadium: Estádio da Serrinha; Attendance: 10,152; Referee: (Brazil) Maguielson Lima Barbosa

14 June 2025 12	CRB	2–0	Goiás	Maceió
17:00	Thiaguinho 34'; Danielzinho (yellow card) 36'; Matheus Albino (yellow card) 69'; Giovanni 76'	Report	Willean Lepo (yellow card) 70'; Lucas Lovat (yellow card) 90+5'	Stadium: Trapichão; Attendance: 7,693; Referee: (Brazil) Fernando de Salles Nascimento

23 June 2025 13	Goiás	1–2	Athletic	Goiânia
22:00	Pedrinho (yellow card) 29'; Marcão 52' (yellow card) 67'; Freitas (yellow card) 56'	Report	Sidimar (yellow card) 20'; Neto Costa 40'; Adriel (yellow card) 52'; Ronaldo 90+5'	Stadium: Estádio da Serrinha; Attendance: 6,490; Referee: (Brazil) Alexandre Vargas Tavares de Jesus

29 June 2025 14	Chapecoense	1–2	Goiás	Chapecó
20:00	Rafael Carvalheira 15'; Marcinho (yellow card) 31'; Victor Caetano (yellow card) 32' (yellow-red card) 63'; João Paulo (yellow card) 42'; Deivity (yellow card) 65'	Report	Anselmo Ramon (yellow card) 35' (goal) 90+7'; Tadeu 89' (pen.)	Stadium: Arena Condá; Attendance: 3,236; Referee: (Brazil) Wagner do Nascimento Magalhães

8 July 2025 15	Goiás	1–1	Criciúma	Goiânia
20:30	Jajá Silva 49' (yellow card) 75'; Aloísio (yellow card) 89' (yellow-red card) 90+7'	Report	Matheus Trindade 4'; Guilherme Lobo (yellow card) 36'; Zé Gabriel (yellow card) 45+1'; Felipinho (yellow card) 47'; Luciano Castán (yellow card) 90+8'	Stadium: Estádio da Serrinha; Attendance: 9,931; Referee: (Brazil) Luciano da Silva Miranda Filho

12 July 2025 16	Athletico Paranaense	0–1	Goiás	Curitiba
21:30	Raul (yellow card) 20'	Report	Messias (yellow card) 33'; Welliton (yellow card) 57'; Anselmo Ramon 77'; Luiz Felipe (yellow card) 90+6'	Stadium: Arena da Baixada; Attendance: 15,789; Referee: (Brazil) Flavio Rodrigues de Souza

19 July 2025 17	Goiás	3–1	Cuiabá	Goiânia
17:00	Jajá Silva 17' 78'; Willean Lepo (yellow card) 45+3'; Pedrinho (yellow card) 60'; Tadeu (yellow card) 66'; Esli García 90+5' (yellow card) 90+6'	Report	Max Alves (yellow card) 26' (yellow-red card) 45+1'; David Miguel 50'; Mateusinho (yellow card) 82'	Stadium: Estádio da Serrinha; Attendance: 8,992; Referee: (Brazil) Gustavo Ervino Bauermann

23 July 2025 18	Novorizontino	1–0	Goiás	Novo Horizonte
20:00	Robson 21' (pen.) (yellow card) 51'; Bruno José (yellow card) 26'; Marlon (yellow card) 37'; Luís Oyama (yellow card) 90+6'	Report	Messias (yellow card) 19'; Juninho (yellow card) 90+3'; Benítez (yellow card) 90+10'	Stadium: Jorjão; Attendance: 3,587; Referee: (Brazil) Wagner do Nascimento Magalhães

29 July 2025 19	Goiás	1–1	Remo	Goiânia
22:30	Thiago Rodrigues (yellow card) 32'; Anselmo Ramon 90+1'	Report	Pedro Rocha 15'; Marrony (yellow card) 24'; Régis (red card) 45+3'; Marcelo Rangel (yellow card) 66'	Stadium: Estádio da Serrinha; Attendance: 11,142; Referee: (Brazil) Felipe Fernandes de Lima

=== Campeonato Goiano ===
Pos	Team	Pld	W	D	L	GF	GA	GD	Pts	Qualification or relegation
2	Vila Nova	11	6	4	1	10	5	+5	22	Advance to Quarter-finals
3	Atlético Goianiense	11	5	4	2	14	8	+6	19	Advance to Quarter-finals
4	Goiás	11	5	3	3	11	7	+4	18	Advance to Quarter-finals
5	CRAC	11	4	5	2	10	7	+3	17	Advance to Quarter-finals
6	Inhumas	11	4	2	5	9	14	−5	14	Advance to Quarter-finals

Source: FGF

==== Results by round ====
Round	1	2	3
Ground	A	H	H
Result	L	D	
Position			

Updated to match(es) played on 18 January 2025. Source:
A = Away; H = Home; W = Win; D = Draw; L = Loss

15 January 2025 1	Goiatuba	2–1	Goiás	Goiatuba
19:30 UTC−3	Gean Maciel Correia 28'; Wallhepph de Lima 45+4'		Tadeu Antonio Ferreira 77' (pen.); Edson Carioca (yellow card) 61' (yellow-red card) 79'	Stadium: Estádio Divino Garcia Rosa

18 January 2025 2	Goiás	0–0	CRAC
16:00 UTC−3

22 January 2025 3	Goiás	3–0	Goiânia	Goiânia
19:30 UTC−3	Barceló 23' 41'; Rodrigo Andrade 80'	Report		Stadium: Estádio da Serrinha; Attendance: 4,607; Referee: (Brazil) Victor Lucas Pereira Silva

25 January 2025 4	Anápolis	0–1	Goiás	Anápolis
16:00		Report	Tadeu 64' (pen.)	Stadium: Estádio Jonas Duarte; Attendance: 3,787; Referee: (Brazil) Artur de Morais Fernandes

28 January 2025 5	Goiás	1–0	Jataiense	Goiânia
19:30	Aloísio (yellow card) 33'; Pedrinho 90+4'	Report	Arthur Pierino (yellow card) 42'	Stadium: Estádio da Serrinha; Attendance: 4,599; Referee: (Brazil) Gabriel dos Santos Queiroz

2 February 2025 6	Vila Nova	1–0	Goiás	Goiânia
17:00	Igor Henrique (yellow card) 25'; Walisson Maia (yellow card) 27'; Elias (yellow card) 35'; Gabriel Poveda 45+1' (pen.); Emerson Urso (yellow card) 48'; João Vieira (yellow card) 54'; Diego Torres (yellow card) 77'; Maurício Kozlinski (yellow card) 80'	Report	Edson Carioca (yellow card) 30'; Lucas Lovat (yellow card) 35'; Lucas Ribeiro (yellow card) 39'	Stadium: Estádio Onésio Brasileiro Alvarenga; Attendance: 28,213; Referee: (Brazil) Anderson Ribeiro Gonçalves

9 February 2025 8	Goiás	1–2	Atlético Goianiense	Goiânia
15:00	Danilo Cunha (yellow card) 24'; Régis (yellow card) 49'; Facundo Barceló (yellow card) 73'; Juninho 77'; Rafael Gava (yellow card) 83'	Report	William Pottker 4' (yellow card) 24'; Guilherme Romão (yellow card) 58'; Janderson (yellow card) 87'; Alejo Cruz 90+2'	Stadium: Estádio da Serrinha; Attendance: 11,474; Referee: (Brazil) Wilton Sampaio

13 February 2025 9	Aparecidense	0–1	Goiás	Aparecida de Goiânia
18:30	Stéfano Pinho (yellow card) 23'	Report	Marcão (yellow card) 36'; Lucas Lovat 79'; Lucas Ribeiro (yellow card) 82'	Stadium: Estádio Annibal Batista de Toledo; Attendance: 1,108; Referee: (Brazil) Breno Vieira Souza

16 February 2025 10	Goianésia	1–1	Goiás	Goianésia
15:00	Sandrinho (yellow card) 53'; Luiz Fernando 90+6'	Report	Tadeu 56' (pen.); Gonzalo Freitas (yellow card) 56'; Lucas Lovat (yellow card) 88'	Stadium: Estádio Valdeir José de Oliveira; Attendance: 2,166; Referee: (Brazil) Jean Carlos da Silva Narciso

20 February 2025 7	Goiás	1–0	Inhumas	Goiânia
18:30	Luiz Felipe 22'	Report	Wallace (yellow card) 68'; Adson (yellow card) 70'; Alex Nagib (yellow card) 90+2'	Stadium: Estádio da Serrinha; Attendance: 3,179; Referee: (Brazil) Gabriel dos Santos Queiroz

23 February 2025 11	Goiás	1–1	Abecat	Goiânia
15:00	Vitinho 13'; Gonzalo Freitas (yellow card) 32'	Report	Rafinha (yellow card) 64'; Marcilio (yellow card) 72'; Romário Simões 77'	Stadium: Estádio da Serrinha; Attendance: 3,178; Referee: (Brazil) Osimar Moreira da Silva Júnior

=== Play Offs ===
2 March 2025 Quarter Final First Leg	CRAC	0–0	Goiás	Catalão
15:00	Correia (yellow card) 19'; Cléo Silva (yellow card) 79'	Report	Luiz Felipe (yellow card) 51'; Lucas Lovat (yellow card) 54'; José Hugo (yellow card) 81'; Danilo Cunha (yellow card) 88'	Stadium: Estádio Genervino da Fonseca; Attendance: 2,828; Referee: (Brazil) Jefferson Ferreira de Moraes

5 March 2025 Quarter Final Second Leg	Goiás	1–1 (3–1 p)	CRAC	Goiânia
18:30	Esli García (yellow card) 47'; Luiz Felipe 53'	Report	Wagner Manaus 78'; Yan Maciel (yellow card) 90+3'	Stadium: Estádio da Serrinha; Attendance: 5,206; Referee: (Brazil) Breno Vieira Souza

9 March 2025 Semi Final First Leg	Goiás	0–1	Vila Nova	Goiânia
16:00		Report	Júnior Todinho (yellow card) 11' (goal) 25'	Stadium: Estádio da Serrinha; Attendance: 11,968; Referee: (Brazil) Breno Vieira Souza

16 March 2025 Semi Final Second Leg	Vila Nova	0–0	Goiás	Goiânia
16:00	Diego Torres (yellow card) 62'	Report	Régis (yellow card) 45+2'; Marcão (yellow card) 59'; Pedrinho (yellow card) 62'	Stadium: Estádio Onésio Brasileiro Alvarenga; Attendance: 26,261; Referee: (Brazil) Wilton Sampaio

=== Copa Verde ===
==== Finals ====
9 April 2025	Paysandu	0–0	Goiás	Belém
20:00 BRT (UTC−3)		Report		Stadium: Mangueirão; Attendance: 32,997; Referee: Alisson Sidnei Furtado

23 April 2025	Goiás	1–1 (4–5 p)	Paysandu	Goiânia
21:00 BRT (UTC−3)	Welliton Matheus 25'	Report	Cavalleri 90+4'	Stadium: Estádio Serra Dourada; Attendance: 38,412; Referee: Davi de Oliveira Lacerda
	Penalties
	Tadeu (penalty scored); Arthur Caíke (penalty scored); DG (penalty scored); Freitas (penalty missed); Messias (penalty scored); Marcão (penalty missed)		(penalty missed) Rossi; (penalty scored) Giovanni; (penalty scored) Marlon; (penalty scored) Cavalleri; (penalty scored) Nicolas; (penalty scored) Leandro Vilela
