= 2025 Copa Verde =

12th edition of a Brazilian association football competition

Tournament details
- Country: Brazil
- Dates: 22 January – 23 April
- Teams: 24

Final positions
- Champions: (Pará) Paysandu (5th title)
- Runners-up: Goiás

Tournament statistics
- Matches played: 30
- Goals scored: 85 (2.83 per match)
- Top goal scorer(s): (Brazil) Rossi (4 goals)

The 2025 Copa Verde was the 12th and last edition as tournament format of this football competition held in Brazil. Featuring 24 clubs, Acre, Amazonas, Distrito Federal, Espírito Santo, Mato Grosso, Pará and Tocantins have two vacancies; Amapá, Goiás, Mato Grosso do Sul, Rondônia and Roraima with one each. The others five berths was set according to CBF ranking.

In the finals, Paysandu defeated Goiás 5–4 on penalties after tied 1–1 on aggregate to win their 5th title and a place in the third round of the 2026 Copa do Brasil.

== Qualified teams ==
Association	Team	Qualification method
(Acre (state)) Acre; 2 berths	Independência	2024 Campeonato Acreano champions
(Acre (state)) Acre; 2 berths	Humaitá	2024 Campeonato Acreano runners-up
(Amapá) Amapá; 1 berth	Trem	2024 Campeonato Amapaense champions
(Amazonas (Brazilian state)) Amazonas; 2 berths	Manaus	2024 Campeonato Amazonense champions
(Amazonas (Brazilian state)) Amazonas; 2 berths	Amazonas	2024 Campeonato Amazonense runners-up
(Federal District (Brazil)) Distrito Federal; 2+1 berths	Ceilândia	2024 Campeonato Brasiliense champions
(Federal District (Brazil)) Distrito Federal; 2+1 berths	Capital	2024 Campeonato Brasiliense runners-up
(Federal District (Brazil)) Distrito Federal; 2+1 berths	Brasiliense	2nd best placed team in the 2025 CBF ranking not already qualified
(Espírito Santo) Espírito Santo; 2 berths	Rio Branco	2024 Campeonato Capixaba champions
(Espírito Santo) Espírito Santo; 2 berths	Vitória	2024 Copa Espírito Santo runners-up
(Goiás) Goiás; 1+2 berths	Vila Nova	2024 Campeonato Goiano runners-up
(Goiás) Goiás; 1+2 berths	Goiás	1st best placed team in the 2025 CBF ranking not already qualified
(Goiás) Goiás; 1+2 berths	Aparecidense	3rd best placed team in the 2025 CBF ranking not already qualified
(Mato Grosso) Mato Grosso; 2 berths	União Rondonópolis	2024 Campeonato Mato-Grossense runners-up
(Mato Grosso) Mato Grosso; 2 berths	Luverdense	2024 Campeonato Mato-Grossense 3rd place
(Mato Grosso do Sul) Mato Grosso do Sul; 1 berth	Operário	2024 Campeonato Sul-Mato-Grossense champions
(Pará) Pará; 2+1 berths	Paysandu	2024 Campeonato Paraense champions
(Pará) Pará; 2+1 berths	Remo	2024 Campeonato Paraense runners-up
(Pará) Pará; 2+1 berths	Águia de Marabá	4th best placed team in the 2025 CBF ranking not already qualified
(Rondônia) Rondônia; 1 berth	Porto Velho	2024 Campeonato Rondoniense champions
(Roraima) Roraima; 1+1 berths	GAS	2024 Campeonato Roraimense champions
(Roraima) Roraima; 1+1 berths	São Raimundo	5th best placed team in the 2025 CBF ranking not already qualified
(Tocantins) Tocantins; 2 berths	União	2024 Campeonato Tocantinense champions
(Tocantins) Tocantins; 2 berths	Tocantinópolis	2024 Campeonato Tocantinense runners-up

== Schedule ==
The schedule of the competition is as follows.

Stage	First leg	Second leg
First round	22 January 2025	
Round of 16	4, 5 and 6 February 2025	
Quarter-finals	12 and 13 February 2025	19, 26 and 27 February 2025
Semi-finals	12 March 2025	19 March 2025
Finals	9 April 2025	23 April 2025

== Bracket ==
First round
(Roraima) São Raimundo	4
(Amapá) Trem	1
(Tocantins) Tocantinópolis	2
(Roraima) GAS	1
(Rondônia) Porto Velho	3
(Acre (state)) Humaitá	2
(Pará) Águia de Marabá (p)	1 (4)
(Acre (state)) Independência	1 (2)
(Federal District (Brazil)) Ceilândia	1 (0)
(Federal District (Brazil)) Capital (p)	1 (3)
(Mato Grosso do Sul) Operário	0
(Mato Grosso) Luverdense	1
(Mato Grosso) União Rondonópolis	3
(Tocantins) União	0
(Espírito Santo) Vitória	1
(Espírito Santo) Rio Branco	2

Round of 16
(Pará) Remo	1 (3)
(Roraima) São Raimundo (p)	1 (4)
(Amazonas (Brazilian state)) Amazonas	5
(Tocantins) Tocantinópolis	1
(Pará) Paysandu (p)	1 (5)
(Rondônia) Porto Velho	1 (4)
(Amazonas (Brazilian state)) Manaus	3
(Pará) Águia de Marabá	2
(Federal District (Brazil)) Brasiliense (p)	0 (5)
(Federal District (Brazil)) Capital	0 (3)
(Goiás) Vila Nova (p)	1 (9)
(Mato Grosso) Luverdense	1 (8)
(Goiás) Aparecidense	2
(Mato Grosso) União Rondonópolis	3
Goiás	6
(Espírito Santo) Rio Branco	0

Quarter-finals
(Roraima) São Raimundo	2	0	2
(Amazonas (Brazilian state)) Amazonas	0	0	0
(Pará) Paysandu	0	4	4
(Amazonas (Brazilian state)) Manaus	0	1	1
(Federal District (Brazil)) Brasiliense	1	3	4
(Goiás) Vila Nova	1	1	2
(Mato Grosso) União Rondonópolis	0	0	0
Goiás	2	3	5

Semi-finals
(Roraima) São Raimundo	2	0	2
(Pará) Paysandu	2	3	5
(Federal District (Brazil)) Brasiliense	3	0	3 (4)
Goiás (p)	3	0	3 (5)

Finals
(Pará) Paysandu (p)	0	1	1 (5)
Goiás	0	1	1 (4)

== Finals ==
9 April 2025
20:00 BRT (UTC−3)

Paysandu (Pará)	0–0	Goiás
	Report

Mangueirão, Belém
Attendance: 32,997
Referee: Alisson Sidnei Furtado

23 April 2025
21:00 BRT (UTC−3)

Goiás	1–1	(Pará) Paysandu
Welliton Matheus 25'	Report	Cavalleri 90+4'
Penalties
Tadeu (penalty scored); Arthur Caíke (penalty scored); DG (penalty scored); Freitas (penalty missed); Messias (penalty scored); Marcão (penalty missed)	4–5	(penalty missed) Rossi; (penalty scored) Giovanni; (penalty scored) Marlon; (penalty scored) Cavalleri; (penalty scored) Nicolas; (penalty scored) Leandro Vilela

Estádio Serra Dourada, Goiânia
Attendance: 38,412
Referee: Davi de Oliveira Lacerda

Tied 1–1 on aggregate, Paysandu won on penalties.
