= Vítor Hugo =

Vítor Hugo may refer to:

- Vítor Hugo (futsal player, born 1982), Portuguese goalkeeper, plays for SC Braga
- Vítor Hugo (futsal player, born 1984), Portuguese defender, plays for Benfica
- Vítor Hugo (footballer, born 1985), Portuguese striker
- Vítor Hugo (footballer, born 1986), Portuguese striker, played for C.D. Trofense
- Vitor Hugo (footballer, born 1991), Brazilian defender, plays for Panathinaikos
- Vitor Hugo (footballer, born 2003), Brazilian footballer
- Vitor Hugo (footballer, born 2004), Brazilian footballer
- Vítor Hugo da Silva (born 1963), Portuguese roller hockey player

Others with the given names "Vítor Hugo" or similar

- Vitor Hugo dos Santos (born 1996), Brazilian sprinter
- Vítor Hugo Gomes Passos (born 1987), a.k.a. Pelé, Portuguese footballer
- Vitor-Hugo Ferreira (born 1965), Portuguese archer
- Vítor Hugo Silva Azevedo (born 1992) a.k.a. Vitinha, Portuguese footballer

== See also ==
- Victor Hugo (disambiguation)
  - Victor Hugo, major French writer
