= DG =

DG may refer to:

== Arts and entertainment ==
- Death Grips, an American experimental hip hop group
- DG (character), in the science fiction series Tin Man
- Dial Global, a radio network
- Dragon Gate, a Japanese professional wrestling promotion
- Drain Gang, a Swedish rap group

== Business and organizations ==
- Daily Guardian (disambiguation), numerous newspapers
- Data General, a minicomputer manufacturer
- Desnoes & Geddes (DG, D&G), a Jamaican brand of soft drinks
- Delta Gamma, a women's sorority
- Deutsche Grammophon, a classical music record label
- DG Flugzeugbau, a German airplane manufacturer
- Dial Global, a radio network
- Dolce & Gabbana, an Italian luxury fashion design
- Dollar General, an American variety store (NYSE ticker DG)

== Places ==
- DG postcode area, the Dumfries and Galloway postcode area in Scotland
- Danilovgrad, a municipality in Montenegro, abbreviated DG on car plates
- German-speaking Community of Belgium (German: Deutschsprachige Gemeinschaft)
- Diego Garcia, exceptionally reserved ISO 3166-1 alpha-2 country code for

== Science, mathematics and technology ==
- Decigram, a unit of measure
- Dentate gyrus, a brain structure
- Diglyme, an organic solvent
- Directional gyroscope, a heading indicator use in aircraft
- Discontinuous Galerkin method, a numerical method
- Distributed generation of energy

== Transport ==
- Cebgo, formerly South East Asian Airlines, SEAir, Tigerair Philippines; IATA code
- Dindigul Junction railway station, Tamil Nadu, India; Indian Railways station code
- North Maluku (vehicle registration prefix DG)

== Other uses ==
- DG (footballer) (born 2001), Douglas da Silva Teixeira, Brazilian footballer
- Dei gratia (Latin: "By the grace of God"), abbreviated D.G.
- Deo gratias (Latin: "Thanks be to God").
- Dangerous goods
- Differential geometry
- Director-general
- Directorate-General, a type of specialised administrative body in the European Union
- Dependency Grammar, a class of modern grammatical theories in linguistics.
