= Lucão (footballer, born 1995) =

Brazilian footballer

Personal information
- Full name: Lucas Marcos Meireles
- Date of birth: 22 September 1995 (age 31)
- Place of birth: Dores do Turvo, Brazil
- Height: 1.91 m (6 ft 3 in)
- Position: Forward

Team information
- Current team: Fagiano Okayama
- Number: 99

Senior career*
Years	Team	Apps	(Gls)
2016	Arsenal-MG	7	(0)
2017	Makedonija GjP	11	(0)
2017–2018	Renova	18	(3)
2018	Gjilani	0	(0)
2018–2019	Apollon Larissa	24	(8)
2019–2020	Kagoshima United	16	(3)
2020	→ Zweigen Kanazawa (loan)	24	(10)
2021–2022	Matsumoto Yamaga	25	(4)
2023–	Fagiano Okayama	118	(13)
- * Club domestic league appearances and goals as of 12 August 2026

Lucas Marcos Meireles (born 22 September 1995), commonly known as Lucão (ルカオ), is a Brazilian professional footballer who plays as a forward for Japanese club Fagiano Okayama.

== Career ==
On 5 July 2018, Lucão joined Albanian-based Kosovan side Gjilani. However, later in the same month, he moved to Greece to join Apollon Larissa.

He moved to Kagoshima United the following season. After one season with Kagoshima United, he was loaned to Zweigen Kanazawa. This loan spell was very successful, with Lucão scoring numerous goals for Zweigen Kanazawa, finishing with ten league goals for the season.

At the expiration of his loan deal with Zweigen Kanazawa, it was announced that he would join Matsumoto Yamaga for the 2021 season. He signed a contract extension with Matsumoto Yamaga for the 2022 season. He left at the end of the 2022 season.

In February 2023, he signed for Fagiano Okayama, following his departure from Matsumoto Yamaga. On 7 January 2025, he signed a new contract with the club.

== Career statistics ==
As of 22 July 2019

Appearances and goals by club, season and competition
Club	Season	League			Cup		Other		Total	
Club	Season	Division	Apps	Goals	Apps	Goals	Apps	Goals	Apps	Goals
Arsenal-MG	2016	–			0	0	7 (Note: Appearances in the Campeonato Mineiro Módulo II)	0	7	0
Makedonija GjP	2016–17	Macedonian First Football League	11	0	0	0	0	0	11	0
Renova	2017–18	Macedonian First Football League	18	3	1 (Note: Appearances in the Macedonian Cup)	0	0	0	19	3
Gjilani	2018–19	Superleague of Kosovo	0	0	0	0	0	0	0	0
Apollon Larissa	2018–19	Football League	24	8	3 (Note: Appearances in the Greek Cup)	3	0	0	27	11
Career total			53	11	4	3	7	0	64	14
