= Victor Hugo (disambiguation) =

Victor Hugo (1802–1885) was a French poet, novelist, and dramatist of the Romantic, author of Les Misérables.

Victor Hugo may also refer to:

== People ==
- Victor Hugo (artist and window dresser) (1942-1993), Venezuelan artist, window dresser and model
- Victor Hugo (Australian footballer) (born 1953), Australian rules footballer
- Victor Hugo (footballer, born 1991), Brazilian association footballer
- Victor Hugo (footballer, born 10 May 2004), Brazilian association footballer
- Victor Hugo (footballer, born 11 May 2004), Brazilian association footballer
- Victor Hugo (footballer, born 2008), Brazilian association footballer
- Victor Hugo (grappler), Brazilian BJJ world champion

== Fiction and media ==
- Victor Hugo (Cars), a character in the film Cars 2

== Other uses ==
- Victor Hugo station, a station on Paris Metro Line 2
- French cruiser Victor Hugo, in service with the French Navy 1907–30

== Similar spellings ==
- Vítor Hugo (disambiguation)

== See also ==
- Victor & Hugo: Bunglers in Crime, a British children's animated series by Cosgrove Hall, broadcast on Children's ITV from 1991 to 1992
