= Patric Calmon =

Brazilian footballer (born 1994)

Personal information
- Full name: Itaro Patric Cardoso Calmon
- Date of birth: 5 July 1994 (age 32)
- Place of birth: Madre de Deus, Brazil
- Height: 1.81 m (5 ft 11 in)
- Position: Left back

Team information
- Current team: Botafogo-PB
- Number: 6

Youth career
- 2009–2014: Bahia
- 2012: → São Paulo (loan)

Senior career*
Years	Team	Apps	(Gls)
2015–2016	Bahia	6	(0)
2016	→ Atlético Goianiense (loan)	5	(0)
2017	Altos	2	(0)
2017–2018	Audax Rio	21	(2)
2018	→ Audax (loan)	4	(0)
2018	→ Londrina (loan)	2	(0)
2019	Treze	5	(0)
2019	Sampaio Corrêa	13	(0)
2020	Votuporanguense	2	(0)
2020–2022	Sampaio Corrêa-RJ	31	(2)
2021–2022	→ Cianorte (loan)	13	(0)
2023	Ypiranga-RS	11	(0)
2023	Cuiabá	15	(0)
2024	Vitória	21	(1)
2025	Paysandu	19	(0)
2026-	Botafogo-PB	29	(0)
- * Club domestic league appearances and goals as of 8 November 2026

Itaro Patric Cardoso Calmon (born 5 July 1994), known as Patric Calmon, PK or just Patric, is a Brazilian footballer who plays as a left back for Botafogo-PB.

== Club career ==
Born in Madre de Deus, Bahia, Patric represented EC Bahia and São Paulo as a youth. He was promoted to the former's first team for the 2015 season, but only featured sparingly.

On 7 January 2016, Patric moved on loan to Atlético Goianiense, but was rarely used. He signed a contract with Altos in December of that year, before ending the 2017 season with Audax Rio.

Patric was presented at Audax in January 2018, before signing for Londrina on 2 March. After featuring in only two matches for the latter, he returned to Audax Rio and missed out promotion from the Campeonato Carioca Série B1.

Patric was presented in the squad of Treze for the 2019 season in December 2018, but was released from the club the following February. He subsequently joined Sampaio Corrêa, and achieved promotion from the Série C with the side.

On 18 November 2019, Patric was announced as the new signing of Votuporanguense. After only two matches, he moved to Sampaio Corrêa-RJ in September 2020.

On 24 February 2021, Cianorte announced the signing of Patric. Sparingly used, he returned to the Galinho da Serra for the latter stages of the 2022 season.

On 15 November 2022, Patric was confirmed as one of Ypiranga-RS' four additions for the ensuing campaign. After impressing during the 2023 Campeonato Gaúcho, he signed a contract with Série A side Cuiabá until the end of the year, after the club paid his release clause.

== Career statistics ==
As of 16 February 2024

Club	Season	League			State League		Cup		Continental		Other		Total	
Club	Season	Division	Apps	Goals	Apps	Goals	Apps	Goals	Apps	Goals	Apps	Goals	Apps	Goals
Bahia	2014	Série B	3	0	3	0	3	0	—		6 (Note: Appearance(s) in Copa do Nordeste)	0	15	0
Atlético Goianiense (loan)	2016	Série B	0	0	5	0	0	0	—		—		5	0
Altos	2017	Série D	0	0	2	0	1	0	—		3	0	6	0
Audax Rio	2017	Carioca Série B1	—		13	2	—		—		1 (Note: Appearance(s) in Copa Rio)	0	14	2
Audax Rio	2018	Carioca Série B1	—		8	0	—		—		6	0	14	0
Audax Rio	Total		—		21	2	—		—		7	0	28	2
Audax (loan)	2018	Paulista A2	—		4	0	—		—		—		4	0
Londrina (loan)	2018	Série B	0	0	2	0	0	0	—		—		2	0
Treze	2019	Série C	0	0	5	0	—		—		—		5	0
Sampaio Corrêa	2019	Série C	8	0	5	0	0	0	—		4	0	17	0
Votuporanguense	2020	Paulista A2	—		2	0	—		—		—		2	0
Sampaio Corrêa-RJ	2020	Carioca Série B1	—		16	1	—		—		—		16	1
Sampaio Corrêa-RJ	2021	Carioca	—		6	1	—		—		—		6	1
Sampaio Corrêa-RJ	2022	Carioca Série A2	—		9	0	—		—		1	0	10	0
Sampaio Corrêa-RJ	Total		—		31	2	—		—		1	0	32	2
Cianorte (loan)	2021	Série D	7	0	2	0	0	0	—		—		9	0
Cianorte (loan)	2022	Série D	0	0	4	0	—		—		—		4	0
Cianorte (loan)	Total		7	0	6	0	0	0	—		—		13	0
Ypiranga	2023	Série C	0	0	11	0	2	0	—		—		13	0
Cuiabá	2023	Série A	15	0	—		—		—		—		15	0
Vitória	2024	Série A	0	0	4	0	0	0	—		1	0	5	0
Career total			33	0	101	4	6	0	0	0	22	0	162	4

== Honours ==
Bahia

- Campeonato Baiano: 2015

Altos

- Campeonato Piauiense: 2017

Paysandu

- Supercopa Grão-Pará: 2025
- Copa Verde: 2025
