= Jajá Silva =

Brazilian professional footballer

Personal information
- Full name: Jandir Breno Souza Silva
- Date of birth: 12 November 1998 (age 27)
- Place of birth: Carandaí, Brazil
- Height: 1.75 m (5 ft 9 in)
- Position: Winger

Team information
- Current team: Remo
- Number: 7

Youth career
- 2015: Betim
- 2016–2017: Arsenal–MG
- 2017–2018: Americano

Senior career*
Years	Team	Apps	(Gls)
2018–2019	Goytacaz	3	(1)
2019–2021	Boavista	1	(0)
2019	→ Aparecida (loan)	10	(3)
2020	→ Criciúma (loan)	15	(1)
2020	→ XV de Piracicaba (loan)	0	(0)
2021	→ Sampaio Corrêa (loan)	17	(3)
2021–2022	Botoșani	27	(5)
2022	Al-Nasr	3	(0)
2022–2023	Dibba Al Fujairah	19	(3)
2023–2024	FC Tokyo	25	(0)
2024	→ Sagan Tosu (loan)	7	(0)
2025	Portuguesa	9	(3)
2025–2026	Goiás	42	(5)
2026–	Remo	6	(1)
- * Club domestic league appearances and goals as of 04:04, 3 April 2026 (UTC)

Jandir Breno Souza Silva (born 12 November 1998), known as Jajá Silva or just Jajá, is a Brazilian professional footballer who plays as a winger for Remo.

== Career ==
Born in Carandaí, Minas Gerais, Jajá played for local sides Betim and Arsenal–MG before finishing his formation with Americano. He joined Goytacaz in 2018 for the year's Copa Rio, but left the club in April 2019.

Jajá moved to Boavista shortly after leaving Goyta, but played in just one match before being loaned out to Aparecida for the Campeonato Goiano Segunda Divisão. On 30 December 2019, he was announced at Criciúma.

Sparingly used, Jajá was presented at XV de Piracicaba on 23 October 2020, for the year's Copa Paulista. A regular starter, he moved to Série B side Sampaio Corrêa on 25 February 2021, while still owned by Boavista.

On 18 August 2021, after helping Sampaio to win the Campeonato Maranhense, Jajá moved abroad and signed for Botoșani in Romania. He scored his first goals abroad on 7 February of the following year, netting a brace in a 4–0 home routing of Dinamo București.

On 19 July 2022, UAE Pro League side Al-Nasr announced the signing of Jajá. On 28 September, however, after just three appearances, he moved to fellow league team Dibba Al Fujairah.

On 28 July 2023, Jajá joined J1 League team FC Tokyo. Unable to establish himself as a starter, he was loaned to Sagan Tosu on 5 August 2024.

On 14 January 2025, Jajá returned to his home country after agreeing to a deal with Portuguesa. On 28 February, he was transferred to Goiás, with Lusa retaining 40% of his economic rights.

On 24 February 2026, Série A side Remo announced the signing of Jajá.

== Career statistics ==
As of 3 April 2026

Club	Season	League			State league		Cup		Continental		Other		Total	
Club	Season	Division	Apps	Goals	Apps	Goals	Apps	Goals	Apps	Goals	Apps	Goals	Apps	Goals
Goytacaz	2018	Carioca	—		—		—		—		1 (Note: Appearance(s) in Copa Rio)	0	1	0
Goytacaz	2019	Carioca	—		3	1	—		—		—		3	1
Goytacaz	Total		—		3	1	—		—		1	0	4	1
Boavista	2019	Série D	1	0	—		—		—		—		1	0
Aparecida (loan)	2019	Goiano 2ª Divisão	—		10	3	—		—		—		10	3
Criciúma (loan)	2020	Série C	4	0	11	1	1	0	—		—		16	1
XV de Piracicaba (loan)	2020	Paulista A2	—		—		—		—		12 (Note: Appearance(s) in Copa Paulista)	4	12	4
Sampaio Corrêa (loan)	2021	Série B	8	0	9	3	1	0	—		7 (Note: Appearance(s) in Copa do Nordeste)	0	25	3
Botoșani	2021–22	Liga I	27	5	—		0	0	—		—		27	5
Al-Nasr	2022–23	UAE Pro League	3	0	—		0	0	—		—		3	0
Dibba Al Fujairah	2022–23	UAE Pro League	19	3	—		1	0	—		2 (Note: Appearance(s) in UAE League Cup)	0	22	3
FC Tokyo	2023	J1 League	8	0	—		0	0	—		—		8	0
FC Tokyo	2024	J1 League	17	0	—		1	0	—		3 (Note: Appearance(s) in J.League Cup)	1	21	1
FC Tokyo	Total		25	0	—		1	0	—		3	1	29	1
Sagan Tosu (loan)	2024	J1 League	7	0	—		—		—		—		7	0
Portuguesa	2025	Série D	0	0	9	3	0	0	—		—		9	3
Goiás	2025	Série B	31	4	2	0	—		—		3 (Note: Appearance(s) in Copa Verde)	0	36	4
Goiás	2026	Série B	0	0	9	1	0	0	—		0	0	9	1
Goiás	Total		31	4	9	1	0	0	—		3	0	45	5
Remo	2026	Série A	6	1	—		0	0	—		1 (Note: Appearance(s) in Copa Norte)	0	7	1
Career total			131	13	51	12	4	0	0	0	29	5	217	30

== Honours ==
Sampaio Corrêa

- Campeonato Maranhense: 2021

Goiás

- Campeonato Goiano: 2026
