= Vitinho (footballer, born February 2004) =

Brazilian footballer

Personal information
- Full name: Vitor Hugo Amorim de Assis
- Date of birth: 18 February 2004 (age 22)
- Place of birth: Campinas, Brazil
- Height: 1.73 m (5 ft 8 in)
- Position: Attacking midfielder

Team information
- Current team: Santa Clara
- Number: 22

Youth career
- Ponte Preta
- 2023–2024: Cruzeiro

Senior career*
Years	Team	Apps	(Gls)
2022	Ponte Preta	2	(0)
2024–2026	Cruzeiro	24	(1)
2025	→ Goiás (loan)	17	(2)
2025	→ Náutico (loan)	5	(0)
2026	→ Náutico (loan)	5	(0)
2026–	Santa Clara	1	(0)
- * Club domestic league appearances and goals as of 29 August 2026

Vitor Hugo Amorim de Assis (born 18 February 2004), commonly known as Vitinho, is a Brazilian footballer who plays as an attacking midfielder for Portuguese Primeira Liga club Santa Clara.

== Career ==
Born in Campinas, São Paulo, Vitinho was a youth product of hometown side Ponte Preta, and was promoted to the first team in April 2022. On 7 August, he renewed his contract until December 2025.

Vitinho made his senior debut for the Macaca on 28 October 2022, coming on as a second-half substitute for Cássio Gabriel in a 1–1 Série B home draw against Criciúma. On 22 December, after just one further first team match, he moved to Cruzeiro and was initially assigned to the under-20 squad.

Vitinho was promoted to the first team of Cruzeiro in January 2024, and made his club – and Série A – debut on 12 May, replacing Álvaro Barreal in a 1–0 away win over Atlético Goianiense.

On 13 July 2026, Vitinho signed a three-season contract with Santa Clara in Portugal.

== Career statistics ==
As of 29 August 2026

Club	Season	League			State League		Cup		Continental		Other		Total	
Club	Season	Division	Apps	Goals	Apps	Goals	Apps	Goals	Apps	Goals	Apps	Goals	Apps	Goals
Ponte Preta	2022	Série B	2	0	—		—		—		—		2	0
Cruzeiro	2024	Série A	21	0	0	0	0	0	3 (Note: Appearance(s) in Copa Sudamericana)	0	—		24	0
Cruzeiro	2025	Série A	0	0	1	0	0	0	0	0	—		1	0
Cruzeiro	2026	Série A	0	0	2	0	0	0	0	0	—		2	0
Cruzeiro	Total		21	0	3	0	0	0	3	0	—		27	0
Goiás (loan)	2025	Série B	9	1	8	1	0	0	—		2 (Note: Appearances in Copa Verde)	1	19	3
Náutico (loan)	2025	Série C	5	0	—		—		—		—		5	0
Náutico	2026	Série B	5	0	0	0	—		—		—		5	0
Santa Clara	2026–27	Primeira Liga	1	0	—		0	0	—		0	0	1	0
Career total			43	1	11	1	0	0	3	0	2	1	59	3
