= Willean Lepo =

Brazilian footballer

Personal information
- Full name: Willean Bernardo Willemen
- Date of birth: 16 January 1997 (age 29)
- Place of birth: Campos dos Goytacazes, Brazil
- Height: 1.82 m (6 ft 0 in)
- Positions: Right-back; defensive midfielder

Team information
- Current team: Criciúma (on loan from Vitória)
- Number: 97

Youth career
- 2014: Americano
- 2015: Cabofriense
- 2016: Macaé

Senior career*
Years	Team	Apps	(Gls)
2016–2018	Macaé	39	(1)
2018	→ Bahia (loan)	0	(0)
2019–2021	Bahia	8	(1)
2020–2021	→ Novorizontino (loan)	29	(2)
2021–2024	Novorizontino	122	(1)
2024–	Vitória	28	(0)
2025	→ Goiás (loan)	42	(1)
2026–	→ Criciúma (loan)	41	(3)
- * Club domestic league appearances and goals as of 22:11, 1 November 2026 (UTC)

Willean Bernardo Willemen (born 16 January 1997), known as Willean Lepo or Willean Lepu, is a Brazilian footballer who plays as either a right-back or a defensive midfielder for Criciúma, on loan from Vitória.

== Career ==
=== Early career ===
Lepo was born in Campos dos Goytacazes, Rio de Janeiro, and represented the youth sides of Americano, Cabofriense and Macaé. After making his first team debut with the latter in the 2016 Série C, he became an undisputed starter in the 2018 Campeonato Carioca.

On 29 May 2018, Lepo moved to Bahia on loan, and was initially assigned to the under-23 squad. He was promoted to the main squad for the 2019 season, signing a permanent deal, but was rarely used afterwards.

=== Novorizontino ===
On 6 July 2020, Lepo was loaned to Novorizontino until the end of the 2021 Campeonato Paulista. After helping in their promotion to the Série C, he signed a permanent deal with Tigre in May 2021.

On 30 November 2022, after establishing himself as a starter as Novorizontino achieved another promotion, Lepo renewed his contract with the club.

=== Vitória ===
On 17 April 2024, Lepo was announced at Vitória on a three-year contract. He made his club – and Série A – debut four days later, replacing Zeca in a 2–2 home draw against former club Bahia.

After failing to establish himself as a regular starter, Lepo served loan stints at Goiás and Criciúma in the following two seasons.

== Career statistics ==
As of 1 November 2026

Club	Season	League			State League		Cup		Continental		Other		Total	
Club	Season	Division	Apps	Goals	Apps	Goals	Apps	Goals	Apps	Goals	Apps	Goals	Apps	Goals
Macaé	2016	Série C	9	0	0	0	—		—		—		9	0
Macaé	2017	Série C	12	0	3	0	—		—		1 (Note: Appearance(s) in Copa Rio)	0	16	0
Macaé	2018	Série D	0	0	15	1	—		—		—		15	1
Macaé	Total		21	0	18	1	—		—		1	0	40	1
Bahia	2018	Série A	0	0	—		—		—		—		0	0
Bahia	2019	Série A	0	0	1	0	0	0	—		0	0	1	0
Bahia	2020	Série A	0	0	7	1	0	0	—		0	0	7	1
Bahia	Total		0	0	8	1	0	0	—		0	0	8	1
Novorizontino	2020	Série D	15	2	3	0	—		—		—		18	2
Novorizontino	2021	Série C	21	1	11	0	—		—		—		32	1
Novorizontino	2022	Série B	28	0	9	0	1	0	—		—		38	0
Novorizontino	2023	Série B	33	0	19	0	—		—		—		52	0
Novorizontino	2024	Série B	0	0	12	0	—		—		—		12	0
Novorizontino	Total		97	3	54	0	1	0	—		—		152	3
Vitória	2024	Série A	28	0	—		1	0	—		—		29	0
Goiás	2025	Série B	31	1	11	0	0	0	—		1 (Note: Appearance(s) in Copa Verde)	0	46	1
Criciúma	2026	Série B	29	3	12	0	—		—		—		41	3
Career total			206	7	103	2	2	0	0	0	2	0	315	9

== Honours ==
Bahia

- Campeonato Baiano: 2019, 2020
