= Daily Guardian =

Daily Guardian or The Daily Guardian may refer to:

- Daily Guardian (Iloilo), the Philippines
- The Daily Guardian (India), Indian daily newspaper that uses the website at thedailyguardian.com
- Daily Guardian (Sydney), Australia
- Nottingham Daily Guardian, former name of the Nottingham Guardian, England
