= Anthony (footballer) =

Brazilian footballer

Personal information
- Full name: Anthony Wesley Ciriano Oliveira
- Date of birth: 12 July 2005 (age 21)
- Place of birth: Santa Bárbara de Goiás, Brazil
- Height: 1.92 m (6 ft 4 in)
- Position: Centre-back

Team information
- Current team: Botafogo
- Number: 26

Youth career
- 2014–2017: Goiás
- 2017–2021: Ovel
- 2021–2024: Goiás

Senior career*
Years	Team	Apps	(Gls)
2024–2026	Goiás	11	(0)
2026–	Botafogo	0	(0)
- * Club domestic league appearances and goals as of 19:39, 2 April 2026 (UTC)

Anthony Wesley Ciriano Oliveira (born 12 July 2005), simply known as Anthony, is a Brazilian footballer who plays as a centre-back for Botafogo.

== Club career ==
=== Goiás ===
Born in Santa Bárbara de Goiás, Goiás, Anthony began his career with Goiás EC at the age of nine. After leaving the club at the age of 12, he played for Associação Esportiva Ovel before returning to the club in 2021, and renewed his contract on 12 August 2022.

Anthony made his first team debut with the Esmeraldino on 18 January 2024, starting in a 1–0 Campeonato Goiano home win over Goiânia. After three further appearances in the main squad, he returned to the under-20s before being definitely promoted to the first team for the 2025 season.

=== Botafogo ===
On 27 March 2026, Botafogo announced the signing of Anthony on a four-year contract; as his contract was due to expire in June, he moved on a free transfer, with Goiás retaining 50% of his economic rights.

== International career ==
On 20 December 2024, Anthony was called up to the Brazil national under-20 team for the 2025 South American U-20 Championship. Despite not playing any matches in the competition, he was a part of the squad which lifted the trophy.

== Career statistics ==
As of 2 April 2026

Club	Season	League			State League		Cup		Continental		Other		Total	
Club	Season	Division	Apps	Goals	Apps	Goals	Apps	Goals	Apps	Goals	Apps	Goals	Apps	Goals
Goiás	2024	Série B	0	0	4	0	0	0	—		—		4	0
Goiás	2025	Série B	7	0	0	0	0	0	—		2 (Note: Appearance(s) in Copa Verde)	0	9	0
Goiás	2026	Série B	0	0	0	0	0	0	—		—		0	0
Goiás	Total		7	0	4	0	0	0	—		2	0	13	0
Botafogo	2026	Série A	0	0	—		0	0	0	0	—		0	0
Career total			7	0	4	0	0	0	0	0	2	0	13	0

== Honours ==
Brazil U20

- South American U-20 Championship: 2025
