= Diego Caito =

Brazilian footballer

Personal information
- Full name: Diego Caito Barcellos Oliveira dos Santos
- Date of birth: 7 June 2004 (age 22)
- Place of birth: São Paulo, Brazil
- Height: 1.80 m (5 ft 11 in)
- Position: Right-back

Team information
- Current team: Grêmio
- Number: 27

Youth career
- 2014–2015: Santo André
- 2016: Palmeiras
- 2017: Grêmio
- 2018: Santo André
- 2019: Juventus-SP
- 2020–2021: Athletico Paranaense
- 2022–2024: Goiás

Senior career*
Years	Team	Apps	(Gls)
2023–	Goiás	72	(3)
2026–	→ Grêmio (loan)	10	(1)
- * Club domestic league appearances and goals as of 19:39, 30 October 2026 (UTC)

Diego Caito Barcellos Oliveira dos Santos (born 7 June 2004), known as Diego Caito, is a Brazilian professional footballer who plays as a right-back for Campeonato Brasileiro Série A club Grêmio, on loan from Goiás.

== Club career ==
Born in São Paulo, Diego Caito joined Goiás' youth setup in 2022, after representing Santo André (two stints), Palmeiras, Grêmio, Juventus-SP and Athletico Paranaense. He made his first team debut with the former on 5 February 2023, coming on as a second-half substitute for Bruno Santos in a 3–0 Campeonato Goiano home win over Grêmio Anápolis.

On 17 October 2023, Diego Caito renewed his contract with the Esmeraldino until December 2025. He extended his link for another year the following 18 March, and finished the 2024 season being regularly used.

Diego Caito became a starter in the 2025 campaign, and scored his first professional goal on 12 April of that year, netting the winner in a 2–1 Série B away success over Operário Ferroviário. On 19 June, he renewed his contract until 2028.

On 24 July 2026, Diego Caito was loaned to Grêmio until the end of the year.

== Career statistics ==
As of 30 October 2026

Club	Season	League			State League		Cup		Continental		Other		Total	
Club	Season	Division	Apps	Goals	Apps	Goals	Apps	Goals	Apps	Goals	Apps	Goals	Apps	Goals
Goiás	2023	Série A	0	0	2	0	0	0	—		0	0	2	0
Goiás	2024	Série B	11	0	2	0	0	0	—		1 (Note: Appearance(s) in Copa Verde)	0	14	0
Goiás	2025	Série B	27	1	5	0	0	0	—		6	0	38	1
Goiás	2026	Série B	12	0	13	2	3	0	—		—		28	2
Goiás	Total		50	1	22	0	3	0	0	0	7	0	82	3
Grêmio (loan)	2026	Série A	10	1	—		4	0	—		—		14	1
Career total			60	2	22	0	7	0	0	0	7	0	96	4
