= Vitor Hugo (footballer, born 2004) =

Brazilian footballer

Personal information
- Full name: Vitor Hugo da Silva Gonçalves
- Date of birth: 24 February 2004 (age 22)
- Place of birth: Itaberaí, Brazil
- Height: 1.80 m (5 ft 11 in)
- Position: Forward

Team information
- Current team: Goiás
- Number: 27

Youth career
- 2020: Vasco de Itaberaí
- 2021–2025: Goiás

Senior career*
Years	Team	Apps	(Gls)
2022–	Goiás	6	(0)
- * Club domestic league appearances and goals as of 01:19, 28 July 2025 (UTC)

Vitor Hugo da Silva Gonçalves (born 24 February 2004), known as Vitor Hugo or Vitinho, is a Brazilian professional footballer who plays as a forward for Goiás.

== Club career ==
Born in Itaberaí, Goiás, Vitor Hugo joined Goiás' youth setup in 2021, from hometown side AA Vasco de Itaberaí. On 9 February 2022, he signed his first professional contract with the club.

Vitor Hugo made his first team – and Série A – debut on 15 June 2022, coming on as a late substitute for Vinícius in a 2–1 home loss against Internacional. On 19 August 2024, despite being rarely used in the main squad, he renewed his contract with the club until December of the following year.

On 3 February 2025, after ending his period with the under-20s, Vitor Hugo further extended his link with Goiás until the end of 2026.

== Career statistics ==
As of 27 July 2025

Club	Season	League			State League		Cup		Continental		Other		Total	
Club	Season	Division	Apps	Goals	Apps	Goals	Apps	Goals	Apps	Goals	Apps	Goals	Apps	Goals
Goiás	2022	Série A	1	0	0	0	0	0	—		—		1	0
Goiás	2023	Série A	0	0	2	0	0	0	—		0	0	2	0
Goiás	2024	Série B	0	0	0	0	0	0	—		0	0	0	0
Goiás	2025	Série B	0	0	3	0	0	0	—		0	0	3	0
Career total			1	0	5	0	0	0	0	0	0	0	6	0
