= Vítor Hugo (footballer, born 1986) =

Portuguese footballer

Personal information
- Full name: Vítor Hugo da Costa Ferreira
- Date of birth: 27 February 1986 (age 40)
- Height: 1.76 m (5 ft 9 in)
- Position: Striker

Youth career
- C.D. Trofense

Senior career*
Years	Team	Apps	(Gls)
2004–2008	C.D. Trofense	32	(0)
2008	→ A.D. Fafe (loan)		
2008	União da Madeira		
2009	A.D. Sanjoanense		
2009–2010	A.D. Fafe		
2010–2011	GD Joane	1	(0)
2011–2012	Leça F.C.	9	(4)
2012	GD Joane	7	(1)
2012–2013	Rebordosa A.C.	16	(3)
- * Club domestic league appearances and goals as of August 1, 2008

Vítor Hugo da Costa Ferreira (born 27 February 1986), known as Vitor Hugo, is a Portuguese former footballer who plays as a striker.
