= José Hugo =

Brazilian footballer

Zé Hugo
Personal information
- Full name: José Hugo Sousa dos Santos
- Date of birth: 17 October 1999 (age 27)
- Place of birth: João Pessoa, Brazil
- Height: 1.77 m (5 ft 10 in)
- Position: Forward

Team information
- Current team: Botafogo-SP (on loan from Azuriz)

Youth career
- Force CM
- Novo Horizonte
- 2019: Botafogo-PB

Senior career*
Years	Team	Apps	(Gls)
2018	Farroupilha	12	(0)
2020	São Gabriel	3	(1)
2021	Nova Mutum	16	(2)
2022–	Azuriz	14	(1)
2022	→ Coritiba (loan)	13	(1)
2023	→ Santo André (loan)	13	(1)
2023–2024	→ Vitória (loan)	39	(3)
2025	→ Goiás (loan)	13	(0)
2025	→ Operário Ferroviário (loan)	9	(0)
2026–	→ Botafogo-SP (loan)	37	(2)
- * Club domestic league appearances and goals as of 18 November 2026

José Hugo Sousa dos Santos (born 17 October 1999), known as José Hugo or Zé Hugo, is a Brazilian footballer who plays as a forward for Botafogo-SP, on loan from Azuriz.

== Club career ==
José Hugo was born in João Pessoa, Paraíba, and made his senior debut with Farroupilha in 2018. He returned to his native state in 2019, playing for the under-20 side of Botafogo-PB, and represented São Gabriel for a short period in 2020 before becoming a free agent amidst the COVID-19 pandemic.

José Hugo played amateur football until an invitation from Nova Mutum arrived in 2021, and he was presented as a part of the squad in June of that year. A regular starter, he renewed his contract on 29 November, but was presented at Azuriz on 18 January 2022.

On 9 April 2022, José Hugo renewed his contract with Azuriz until December 2024. Four days later, he joined Série A side Coritiba on loan until the end of the year.

José Hugo made his debut in the top tier of Brazilian football on 15 May 2022, starting in a 1–0 home win over América Mineiro.

== Career statistics ==
As of 16 February 2024

Club	Season	League			State League		Cup		Continental		Other		Total	
Club	Season	Division	Apps	Goals	Apps	Goals	Apps	Goals	Apps	Goals	Apps	Goals	Apps	Goals
Farroupilha	2018	Gaúcho Série B	—		12	0	—		—		7 (Note: Appearance(s) in Copa FGF)	2	19	2
São Gabriel	2020	Gaúcho Série A2	—		3	1	—		—		—		3	1
Nova Mutum	2021	Série D	16	2	—		—		—		11 (Note: Six appearances and one goal in Copa FMF, five appearances in Copa Verde)	1	27	3
Azuriz	2022	Série D	0	0	8	1	2	0	—		—		10	1
Coritiba (loan)	2022	Série A	13	1	—		—		—		—		13	1
Santo André (loan)	2023	Série D	0	0	13	1	—		—		—		13	1
Vitória	2023	Série B	34	3	—		—		—		—		34	3
Vitória	2024	Série A	0	0	5	0	0	0	—		3 (Note: Appearance(s) in Copa do Nordeste)	0	8	0
Vitória	Total		34	3	5	0	0	0	—		3	0	42	3
Career total			63	6	41	3	2	0	0	0	21	3	127	12
