= Rafael Gava =

Brazilian footballer

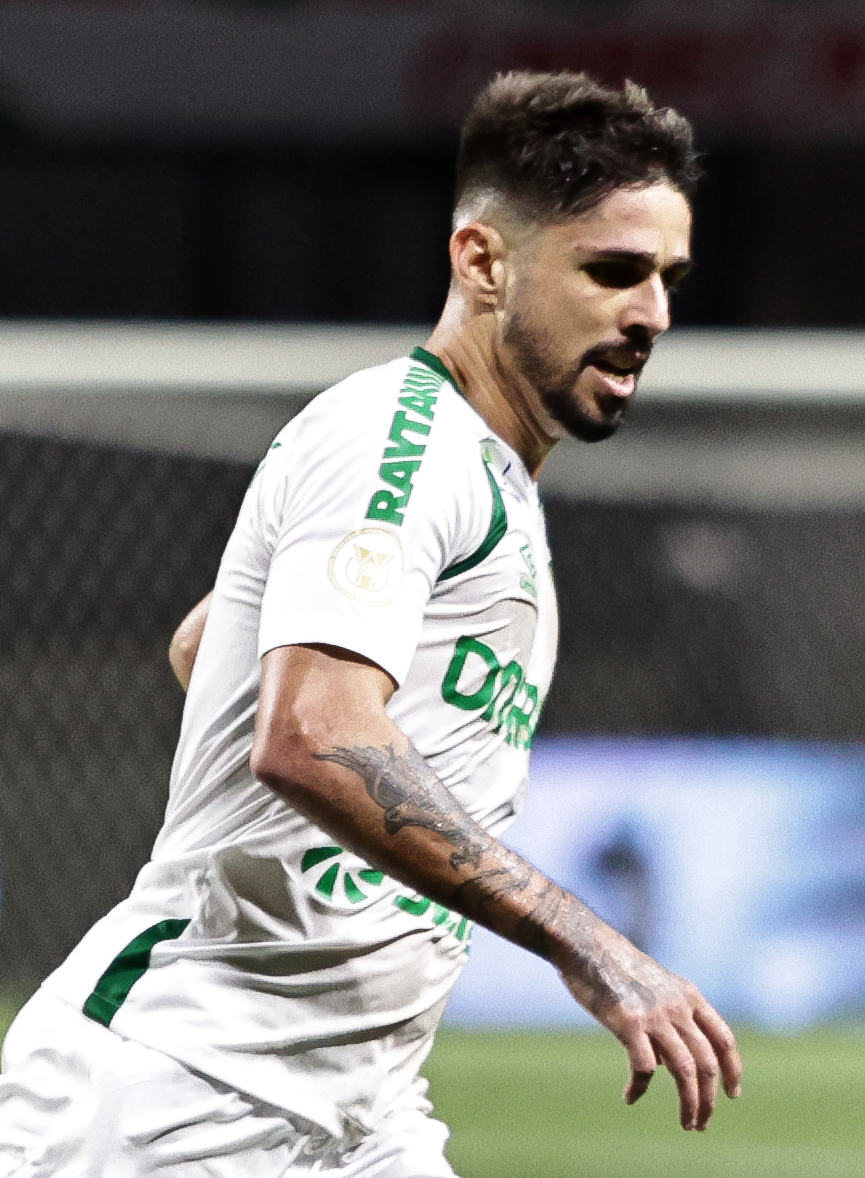
- Rafael Gava with Cuiabá in 2022

Personal information
- Full name: Rafael Gustavo Meneghel Gava
- Date of birth: 20 May 1993 (age 33)
- Place of birth: Americana, Brazil
- Height: 1.78 m (5 ft 10 in)
- Position: Midfielder

Team information
- Current team: Botafogo-SP

Youth career
- 2011–2014: Internacional

Senior career*
Years	Team	Apps	(Gls)
2014	Internacional	0	(0)
2014	→ ASA (loan)	14	(2)
2015	Lajeadense	13	(2)
2015–2017	Londrina	89	(7)
2018–2019	Caxias	41	(11)
2018	→ Brasil de Pelotas (loan)	8	(0)
2019–2020	Paços de Ferreira	3	(0)
2020	→ Cuiabá (loan)	15	(3)
2020–2023	Cuiabá	138	(15)
2023–2024	Avaí	41	(0)
2024–2025	Goiás	75	(4)
2026–	Botafogo-SP	42	(3)
- * Club domestic league appearances and goals as of 18 November 2026

Rafael Gustavo Meneghel Gava (born 20 May 1993), known as Rafael Gava, is a Brazilian footballer who plays as a midfielder for Botafogo-SP.

== Club career ==
On 24 June 2019, Gava signed a 3-year contract with Primeira Liga club Paços de Ferreira. The following 28 January, he was loaned back to his home country with Cuiabá.

On 24 October 2020, Gava signed a permanent deal with Cuiabá until April 2022. The following 1 March, after helping the Dourado in their first-ever promotion to the Série A, he renewed his contract until December 2023.

== Career statistics ==
As of 26 February 2023.

Club	Season	League			State League		Cup		Continental		Other		Total	
Club	Season	Division	Apps	Goals	Apps	Goals	Apps	Goals	Apps	Goals	Apps	Goals	Apps	Goals
ASA	2014	Série C	6	0	8	2	3	0	—		—		17	2
Lajeadense	2015	Gaúcho	—		13	2	2	0	—		—		15	2
Londrina	2015	Série C	18	2	—		—		—		—		18	2
Londrina	2016	Série B	30	3	14	2	2	1	—		—		46	6
Londrina	2017	Série B	13	0	14	0	1	0	—		3 (Note: Appearance(s) in Primeira Liga)	0	31	0
Londrina	Total		61	5	28	2	3	1	—		3	0	95	8
Caxias	2018	Série D	9	0	11	2	1	0	—		—		21	2
Caxias	2019	Série D	10	3	10	6	—		—		—		20	9
Caxias	Total		19	3	21	8	1	0	—		—		41	11
Brasil de Pelotas (loan)	2018	Série B	8	0	—		—		—		—		8	0
Paços de Ferreira	2019–20	Primeira Liga	2	0	—		1	0	—		0	0	3	0
Cuiabá	2020	Série B	21	6	6	0	0	0	—		3 (Note: Appearance(s) in Copa Verde)	0	30	6
Cuiabá	2021	Série A	31	2	13	3	2	0	—		0	0	46	5
Cuiabá	2022	Série A	29	1	10	1	2	0	5 (Note: Appearance(s) in Copa Sudamericana)	0	—		46	2
Cuiabá	2023	Série A	0	0	8	1	0	0	—		—		8	1
Cuiabá	Total		81	9	37	5	4	0	5	0	3	0	130	14
Career total			177	17	107	19	14	1	5	0	6	0	309	37

== Honours ==
Cuiabá

- Campeonato Mato-Grossense: 2021, 2022, 2023
