= Rossi (footballer) =

Brazilian footballer

Personal information
- Full name: Rosicley Pereira da Silva
- Date of birth: 22 April 1993 (age 33)
- Place of birth: Prainha, Brazil
- Height: 1.70 m (5 ft 7 in)
- Position: Winger

Team information
- Current team: Paysandu
- Number: 77

Youth career
- 2009–2010: Flamengo
- 2010–2011: Fluminense
- 2011–2012: Ponte Preta

Senior career*
Years	Team	Apps	(Gls)
2012–2015	Ponte Preta	31	(1)
2013	→ Mogi Mirim (loan)	15	(2)
2015	→ Paraná (loan)	8	(2)
2015	→ Operário Ferroviário (loan)	9	(2)
2016	São Bento	13	(2)
2016	Goiás	31	(9)
2017	Chapecoense	27	(6)
2017–2019	Shenzhen FC	8	(2)
2018	→ Internacional (loan)	28	(1)
2019	→ Vasco da Gama (loan)	39	(3)
2020–2022	Bahia	58	(7)
2022–2023	Al-Faisaly	38	(8)
2023–2024	Vasco da Gama	27	(1)
2025–	Paysandu	28	(8)
- * Club domestic league appearances and goals as of 19 December 2025

Rossicley Pereira da Silva (born 22 April 1993), commonly known as Rossi, is a Brazilian professional footballer who plays as a forward for Brazilian club Paysandu Sport Club.

== Club career ==
Born in Prainha, Pará, Rossi represented Flamengo and Fluminense before joining Ponte Preta in 2011. On 22 January 2012 he made his first team debut, coming on as a second half substitute for Caio in a 0–1 Campeonato Paulista away loss against São Caetano.

Rossi made his Série A debut on 11 November 2012, replacing Rildo in a 1–0 home win against Internacional. After not being utilized during the first half of the 2013 season, he was loaned to Mogi Mirim until the end of the year on 14 May.

Returning to Ponte ahead of the 2014 campaign, Rossi appeared sparingly as his side achieved top tier promotion. The following year, he served loan stints at Paraná and Operário Ferroviário.

On 21 December 2015, Rossi joined São Bento permanently. The following 23 May, he signed for Série B side Goiás.

Rossi was the club's second top goalscorer of the Esmeraldino during the 2016 campaign, only two goals shy of Léo Gamalho; highlights included a brace in a 4–2 home win over Náutico on 16 July. On 21 December, after failing to agree new terms, he moved to Chapecoense in the Série A.

On 14 July 2017, Rossi signed for China League One side Shenzhen FC.

He transferred to Internacional on loan in March 2018.

On 13 January 2022, Rossi joined Saudi Arabian club Al-Faisaly.

On 9 August 2023, Rossi joined Brazilian club Vasco da Gama.

On 6 January 2025, Rossi joined Brazilian club Paysandu Sport Club

== Career statistics ==
=== Club ===
As of 24 October 2021.

Club	Season	League			State League		Cup		Continental		Other		Total	
Club	Season	Division	Apps	Goals	Apps	Goals	Apps	Goals	Apps	Goals	Apps	Goals	Apps	Goals
Ponte Preta	2012	Série A	3	0	5	0	1	0	—		—		9	0
Ponte Preta	2013	Série A	0	0	0	0	1	0	—		—		1	0
Ponte Preta	2014	Série B	9	0	14	1	5	1	—		—		28	2
Ponte Preta	2015	Série A	0	0	0	0	0	0	—		—		0	0
Ponte Preta	Total		12	0	19	1	7	1	—		—		38	2
Mogi Mirim (loan)	2013	Série C	15	2	—		—		—		—		15	2
Paraná (loan)	2015	Série B	0	0	8	2	2	0	—		—		10	2
Operário Ferroviário (loan)	2015	Série D	9	2	—		—		—		—		9	2
São Bento	2016	Paulista	—		13	2	—		—		—		13	2
Goiás	2016	Série B	31	9	—		—		—		—		31	9
Chapecoense	2017	Série A	10	2	17	4	2	0	7 (Note: Five appearances and one goal in Copa Libertadores, one appearance in Copa Sudamericana)	1	1 (Note: Appearance(s) in Recopa Sudamericana)	0	36	7
Shenzhen FC	2017	China League One	8	2	—		0	0	—		—		8	2
Internacional (loan)	2018	Série A	27	1	1	0	2	0	—		—		30	1
Vasco da Gama (loan)	2019	Série A	29	2	10	1	2	1	—		—		41	4
Bahia	2020	Série A	34	5	1	0	1	0	8 (Note: Appearance(s) in Copa Sudamericana)	0	8 (Note: Appearance(s) in Copa do Nordeste)	0	52	5
Bahia	2021	Série A	17	1	0	0	6	5	0	0	10	1	33	7
Bahia	Total		51	6	1	0	7	5	8	0	18	1	85	12
Career total			192	25	69	10	22	7	14	1	19	1	316	44

== Honours ==
Chapecoense

- Campeonato Catarinense: 2017

Vasco da Gama

- Taça Guanabara: 2019

Bahia

- Campeonato Baiano: 2020
- Copa do Nordeste: 2021

Paysandu

- Copa Verde: 2025
