= Messias (footballer) =

Brazilian footballer

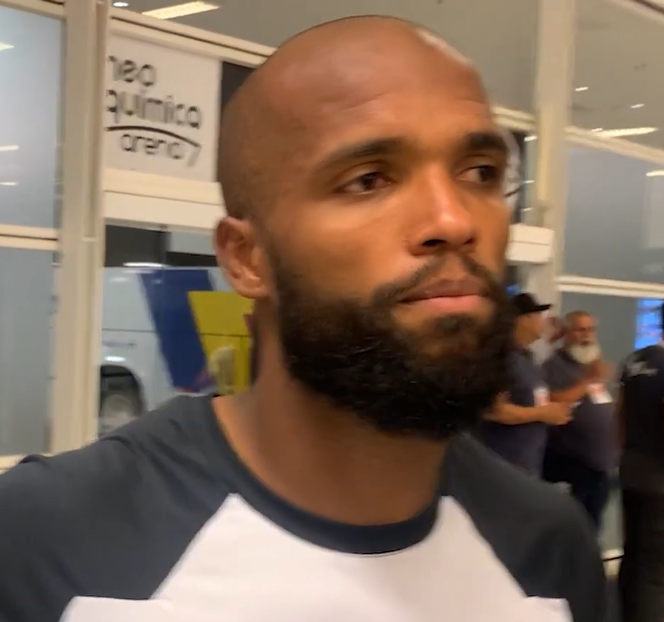
- Messias in 2023

Personal information
- Full name: Messias Rodrigues da Silva Júnior
- Date of birth: 3 November 1994 (age 32)
- Place of birth: São Mateus, Brazil
- Height: 1.90 m (6 ft 3 in)
- Position: Centre back

Team information
- Current team: Juventude
- Number: 4

Youth career
- São Mateus
- Cruzeiro
- 2013–2014: América Mineiro

Senior career*
Years	Team	Apps	(Gls)
2014–2021	América Mineiro	143	(8)
2019–2020	→ Rio Ave (loan)	12	(0)
2021–2022	Ceará	63	(1)
2023–2025	Santos	34	(2)
2024–2025	→ Goiás (loan)	66	(2)
2026–	Juventude	35	(1)
- * Club domestic league appearances and goals as of 17 November 2026

Messias Rodrigues da Silva Júnior (born 3 November 1994), simply known as Messias, is a Brazilian footballer who plays as a central defender for Juventude.

== Career ==
=== América Mineiro ===
Born in São Mateus, Messias represented the youth academy of São Mateus and Cruzeiro before moving to the academy of América Mineiro in 2013. On 2 February 2014, he was promoted to the senior team, signing a deal which would keep him at the club until 2016. On 28 November 2015, he made his first team debut, starting in a 0–0 draw against Botafogo in Série B.

In the 2016 season, Messias played his first league match in a 2–0 defeat against Palmeiras, replacing the injured Roger. He played regularly in the 2017 season, featuring 47 times for the club and scoring one goal, with his side winning the Série B and thus achieving promotion to Série A.

On 5 January 2018, Messias' contract was extended until December 2022. On 30 January of the following year, Messias was loaned out to Portuguese club Rio Ave until the middle of 2020 for € 200,000.

Upon returning, Messias became a regular starter for Coelho, helping with three goals in 36 league appearances as the club returned to the first division.

=== Ceará ===
On 24 March 2021, Messias signed a contract with fellow top tier side Ceará until December 2023.

=== Santos ===
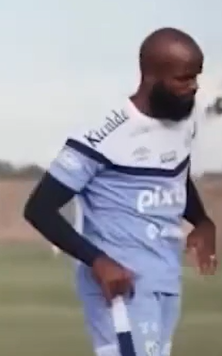
Messias training with Santos in 2023

On 7 December 2022, after Ceará's relegation, Messias signed a three-year contract with Santos also in the top tier. He made his debut for the club the following 22 January, starting in a 1–1 Campeonato Paulista away draw against São Bernardo.

Messias scored his first goal for Peixe on 26 April 2023, netting the winner in a 1–0 home success over Botafogo-SP, for the year's Copa do Brasil.

==== Loan to Goiás ====
On 11 April 2024, Santos announced the loan of Messias to Goiás until the end of the year. On 4 December, his loan was extended for a further season.

=== Juventude ===
On 24 December 2025, Juventude announced the signing of Messias on a two-year contract.

== Career statistics ==
As of 16 December 2025

Club	Season	League			State League		Cup		Continental		Other		Total	
Club	Season	Division	Apps	Goals	Apps	Goals	Apps	Goals	Apps	Goals	Apps	Goals	Apps	Goals
América Mineiro	2015	Série B	1	0	0	0	0	0	—		—		1	0
América Mineiro	2016	Série A	9	0	0	0	0	0	—		—		9	0
América Mineiro	2017	Série B	32	1	12	2	1	0	—		2 (Note: Appearance(s) in Primeira Liga)	0	47	3
América Mineiro	2018	Série A	35	1	13	0	2	0	—		—		50	1
América Mineiro	2019	Série B	0	0	0	0	0	0	—		—		0	0
América Mineiro	2020	Série B	36	3	2	0	8	0	—		—		46	3
América Mineiro	2021	Série A	0	0	3	1	1	0	—		—		4	1
América Mineiro	Total		113	5	30	3	12	0	—		2	0	157	8
Rio Ave (loan)	2018–19	Primeira Liga	7	0	—		—		—		—		7	0
Rio Ave (loan)	2019–20	Primeira Liga	5	0	—		1	0	0	0	2 (Note: Appearance(s) in Taça da Liga)	0	8	0
Rio Ave (loan)	Total		12	0	—		1	0	0	0	2	0	15	0
Ceará	2021	Série A	34	1	2	0	—		5 (Note: Appearance(s) in Copa Sudamericana.)	0	7 (Note: Appearance(s) in Copa do Nordeste.)	1	48	2
Ceará	2022	Série A	25	0	2	0	5	0	9	1	6	0	47	1
Ceará	Total		59	1	4	0	5	0	14	1	13	1	95	3
Santos	2023	Série A	28	2	5	0	5	1	5	0	—		43	3
Santos	2024	Série B	0	0	1	0	—		—		—		1	0
Santos	Total		28	2	6	0	5	1	5	0	—		44	3
Goiás (loan)	2024	Série B	23	0	—		—		—		—		23	0
Goiás (loan)	2025	Série B	29	2	14	0	—		—		4 (Note: Appearance(s) in Copa Verde.)	0	47	2
Goiás (loan)	Total		52	2	14	0	—		—		4	0	70	2
Career total			264	10	54	3	23	1	19	1	21	1	381	16

== Honours ==
América Mineiro

- Campeonato Brasileiro Série B: 2017
