= Giovanni Piccolomo =

Brazilian footballer (born 1994)

Personal information
- Full name: Giovanni Piccolomo
- Date of birth: 4 April 1994 (age 32)
- Place of birth: Sorocaba, Brazil
- Height: 1.73 m (5 ft 8 in)
- Positions: Attacking midfielder; winger

Team information
- Current team: Botafogo-PB
- Number: 18

Youth career
- 2008–2012: Corinthians

Senior career*
Years	Team	Apps	(Gls)
2012–2017	Corinthians	9	(1)
2013	→ Ponte Preta (loan)	9	(0)
2014	→ Portuguesa (loan)	0	(0)
2015	→ São Bento (loan)	0	(0)
2015	→ Atlético Paranaense (loan)	8	(0)
2016	→ Tigres do Brasil (loan)	0	(0)
2016–2017	→ São Bento (loan)	6	(2)
2017	Náutico	21	(2)
2018	Goiás	33	(5)
2019–2020	Coritiba	32	(2)
2020–2023	Cruzeiro	41	(5)
2021	→ Avaí (loan)	1	(0)
2022	→ Sport Recife (loan)	28	(1)
2023	FC U Craiova	10	(0)
2023–2024	Avaí	54	(6)
2025	Paysandu	11	(1)
2025	CRB	16	(2)
2026–	Botafogo-PB	23	(2)

International career
2012–2013	Brazil U20	5	(0)
- * Club domestic league appearances and goals as of 8 November 2026

Giovanni Piccolomo (born 4 April 1994, in São Paulo), sometimes known as just Giovanni, is a Brazilian footballer who plays as an attacking midfielder for Brasileirão Série C club Botafogo-PB.

== Career ==
Giovanni Piccolomo was on the squad of Corinthians in the 2012 Copa São Paulo de Futebol Júnior. He was also part of the squad who won the 2012 FIFA Club World Cup and 2013 Campeonato Paulista. Whilst under contract with Corinthians, he was loaned out several times. Firstly, to Ponte Preta in June 2013 for 2013 Campeonato Brasileiro Série B. Then to Portuguesa in 2014 for 2014 Campeonato Paulista, where he stayed only two months before returning to Corinthians. In 2015 he appeared at first for São Bento in 2015 Campeonato Paulista, and then for Athletico Paranaense in 2015 Campeonato Brasileiro Série A. For the last 6 months of his Corinthians contract he was loaned to Tigres do Brasil and played in 2016 Campeonato Carioca.

With his Corinthians contract over, Giovanni Piccolomo signed for a second time with São Bento in July 2016, agreeing a contract until the end of the 2016 Campeonato Brasileiro Série D. He played in six of the second phase games, scoring twice, helping São Bento gain promotion and agreeing to stay at the club in 2017.

In May 2017, Giovanni Piccolomo joined Náutico to play in 2017 Campeonato Brasileiro Série B. After playing 21 times he asked for contract to be terminated. According to his manager this was due to personal problems, but Giovanni himself blamed lack of payment of wages.

In December 2017 he signed for Goiás. His 33 appearances and 5 goals helped the club win promotion from 2018 Campeonato Brasileiro Série B, but a new contract could not be agreed and he signed for Coritiba in January 2019.

== Honours ==
Corinthians

- FIFA Club World Cup: 2012
- Campeonato Paulista: 2013

Ponte Preta

- Copa Sudamericana runner-up: 2013

Goiás

- Campeonato Goiano : 2018

Coritiba

- Campeonato Paranaense runner-up : 2018

Avaí

- Campeonato Catarinense: 2021

Cruzeiro

- Campeonato Mineiro runner-up: 2022

Paysandu

- Supercopa Grão-Pará: 2025
- Copa Verde: 2025

== Career statistics ==
As of match played 17 September 2023.

Appearances and goals by club, season and competition
Club	Season	National League			State League		National Cup		Continental		Other		Total	
Club	Season	Division	Apps	Goals	Apps	Goals	Apps	Goals	Apps	Goals	Apps	Goals	Apps	Goals
Corinthians	2012	Série A	9	1	1	0	0	0	0	0	0	0	10	1
Corinthians	2013	Série A	—		7	1	—		0	0	0	0	7	1
Corinthians	Total		9	1	8	1	0	0	0	0	0	0	17	2
Ponte Preta (loan)	2013	Série A	9	0	—		1	0	2 (Note: Appearances in 2013 Copa Sudamericana.)	0	—		12	0
Portuguesa (loan)	2014	Paulista	—		4	1	—		—		—		4	1
São Bento (loan)	2015	Paulista	—		12	0	—		—		—		12	0
Atlético Paranaense (loan)	2015	Série A	8	0	—		0	0	0	0	—		8	0
Tigres do Brasil (loan)	2016	Carioca	—		12	3	—		—		—		12	3
São Bento (loan)	2016	Série D	6	2	—		—		—		—		6	2
São Bento (loan)	2017	Paulista	—		11	0	1	0	—		—		12	0
São Bento (loan)	Total		6	2	11	0	1	0	—		—		18	2
Náutico	2017	Série B	21	2	—		—		—		—		21	2
Goiás	2018	Série B	33	5	14	1	7	1	—		—		54	7
Coritiba	2019	Série B	30	2	11	2	1	0	—		—		42	4
Coritiba	2020	Série A	2	0	—		—		—		—		2	0
Coritiba	Total		32	2	11	2	1	0	—		—		44	4
Cruzeiro	2020	Série B	10	0	—		—		—		—		10	0
Cruzeiro	2021	Série B	31	5	—		0	0	—		—		31	5
Cruzeiro	2022	Mineiro	—		6	2	1	0	—		—		7	2
Cruzeiro	Total		41	5	6	2	1	0	—		—		48	7
Avaí (loan)	2021	Série B	1	0	12	1	4	1	—		—		17	2
Sport Recife (loan)	2022	Série B	28	1	—		—		—		—		28	1
FC U Craiova	2022–23	Liga I	10	0	—		0	0	—		0	0	10	0
Avaí	2023	Série B	5	0	0	0	0	0	—		—		5	0
Career Total			203	18	90	8	15	2	2	0	0	0	310	28
