= Arsenal Atividades Desportivas Sport Club =

Arsenal
- Full name: Arsenal Atividades Desportivas Sport Club
- Founded: 20 June 2006; 18 years ago
- Ground: Estádio do Frimisa, Santa Luzia, Minas Gerais state, Brazil
- Capacity: 3,200
Home colors	Away colors	Third colors

Arsenal Atividades Desportivas Sport Club, commonly known as Arsenal, is a Brazilian football club based in Santa Luzia, Minas Gerais state.

== History ==
The club was founded on 20 June 2006, and professionalized its football department in 2010.

== Stadium ==
Arsenal Atividades Desportivas Sport Club play their home games at Estádio Municipal Victor Andrade de Brito, commonly known as Estádio do Frimisa. The stadium has a maximum capacity of 3,200 people.
