= Thiago Rodrigues =

Brazilian footballer

Personal information
- Full name: Thiago Rodrigues de Oliveira Nogueira
- Date of birth: 20 October 1988 (age 38)
- Place of birth: São Paulo, Brazil
- Height: 1.90 m (6 ft 3 in)
- Position: Goalkeeper

Team information
- Current team: Goiás
- Number: 1

Youth career
- 2004–2007: Paraná

Senior career*
| Years | Team | Apps | (Gls) |
| 2008–2014 | Paraná | 29 | (0) |
| 2009 | → Rio Branco-PR (loan) | 5 | (0) |
| 2014 | Rio Branco-PR | 14 | (0) |
| 2015 | Caxias | 16 | (0) |
| 2016 | Guarani de Palhoça | 16 | (0) |
| 2016–2017 | Figueirense | 36 | (0) |
| 2018–2019 | Paraná | 58 | (0) |
| 2020–2021 | CSA | 44 | (0) |
| 2022 | Vasco da Gama | 48 | (0) |
| 2023 | Vitória | 2 | (0) |
| 2024– | Goiás | 16 | (0) |
- * Club domestic league appearances and goals as of 16 November 2026

Thiago Rodrigues de Oliveira Nogueira (born 20 October 1988), known as Thiago Rodrigues is a Brazilian footballer who plays as a goalkeeper for Goiás.

== Career ==
Thiago Rodrigues began his career with Paraná in the club's youth team before moving into the first-team, he made 16 league appearances in eight years for the club. In 2012, he and Paraná won the Campeonato Paranaense 2. Four years previous he completed a loan move to Rio Branco, but left without appearing in the league. Rodrigues departed Paraná in 2014 and subsequently joined the aforementioned Rio Branco permanently. He participated in 14 Campeonato Paranaense matches for Rio Branco as the club finished as runners-up before departing.

2015 saw a move to Caxias for Rodrigues, he made his Campeonato Gaúcho debut for Caxias against Grêmio Esportivo Brasil on 31 January before making his Série C debut on 17 May versus Madureira. He went onto make eight appearances in both competitions for Caxias before leaving to join Guarani in 2016. Following 16 appearances for Guarani in the 2016 Campeonato Catarinense, Rodrigues secured a transfer to Série A side Figueirense.

== Honours ==
Paraná

- Campeonato Paranaense Série Prata (1): 2012

CSA

- Campeonato Alagoano (1): 2021

Vitória

- Campeonato Brasileiro Série B (1): 2023
