= Tadeu (footballer, born 1992) =

Brazilian footballer

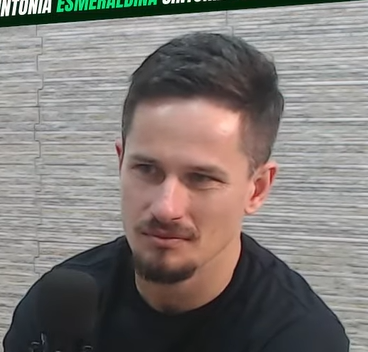
- Tadeu in 2023

Personal information
- Full name: Tadeu Antônio Ferreira
- Date of birth: 4 February 1992 (age 34)
- Place of birth: Joaquim Távora, Brazil
- Height: 1.84 m (6 ft 0 in)
- Position: Goalkeeper

Team information
- Current team: Goiás
- Number: 23

Youth career
- 2007–2012: Coritiba

Senior career*
Years	Team	Apps	(Gls)
2013–2015	Coritiba	0	(0)
2013	→ Tupi (loan)	5	(0)
2013	→ Junior Team (loan)	10	(0)
2015	→ Maringá (loan)	9	(0)
2016	Ceará	0	(0)
2016–2019	Ferroviária	34	(1)
2018	→ Oeste (loan)	37	(0)
2019	→ Goiás (loan)	37	(0)
2020–	Goiás	332	(9)
- * Club domestic league appearances and goals as of 17 November 2026

Tadeu Antônio Ferreira (born 4 February 1992), simply known as Tadeu, is a Brazilian footballer who plays for Goiás as a goalkeeper.

== Club career ==
=== Coritiba ===
Born in Joaquim Távora, Paraná, Tadeu was a Coritiba youth graduate, after joining the club at the age of 15. In February 2013, he was loaned to Tupi, and made his senior debut on 3 March by starting in a 1–1 Campeonato Mineiro home draw against América Mineiro.

Tadeu subsequently represented Junior Team and Maringá on loan before leaving Coxa in 2015, after his contract expired.

=== Ceará ===
On 7 January 2016, Tadeu agreed to a one-year deal with Ceará. He left the club in July, however, after making no official appearances.

=== Ferroviária ===
In late 2016, Tadeu was invited by a former personal coach to join Ferroviária, initially as a third-choice behind Matheus Nogueira and César. He shared the starting spot with Nogueira during his first full year, and later became an undisputed starter after Nogueira and César both left.

Tadeu scored his first senior goal on 24 March 2018, netting his team's third through a penalty kick in a 3–1 home defeat of Red Bull Brasil for the Campeonato Paulista championship; by doing so, he became the first goalkeeper to score a goal for Ferroviária in the club's history.

==== Loan to Oeste ====
On 6 April 2018, Tadeu agreed to a loan deal with Série B side Oeste until the end of the year. An immediate first-choice, he only missed one league match due to suspension as the club narrowly avoided relegation.

=== Goiás ===
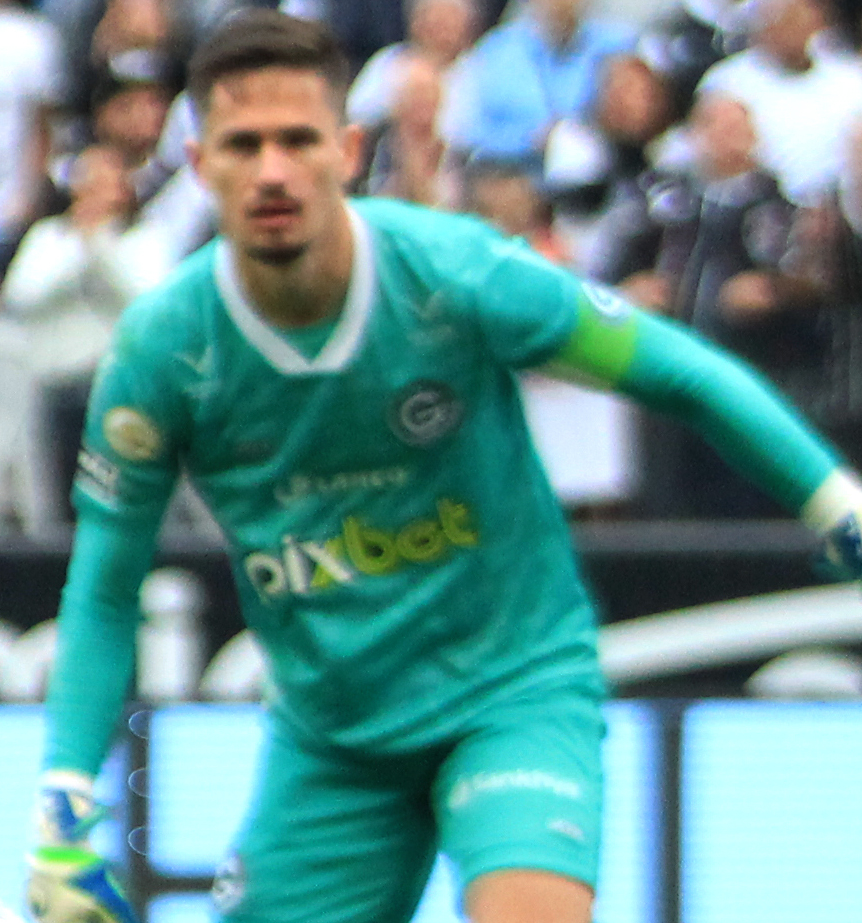
Tadeu with Goiás in 2022

Returning to AFE for the 2019 campaign, Tadeu was again a regular starter for the club before joining Goiás of the Série A on 4 April 2019, on loan until December. He made his top tier debut on 28 April, starting in a 1–0 away defeat of Fluminense.

In December 2019, after being an undisputed starter for Goiás, Tadeu signed a permanent four-year contract with the club. On 6 April 2022, he further extended his link until 2026.

On 12 August 2024, Tadeu once again made major headlines after scoring two goals from penalty kicks to seal a 2–1 comeback against EC Ceará. The feat made him to be the first goalkeeper in Brazilian football to score twice in the same match since Rogerio Ceni, to be the first goalkeeper to score twice in the Brazilian Série B, to be the first goalkeeper to score twice for Goiás EC and to become the club’s top scoring goalkeeper of all time.

== Career statistics ==
As of 2 January 2024

Club	Season	League			State League		Cup		Continental		Other		Total	
Club	Season	Division	Apps	Goals	Apps	Goals	Apps	Goals	Apps	Goals	Apps	Goals	Apps	Goals
Coritiba	2013	Série A	0	0	0	0	0	0	—		—		0	0
Coritiba	2014	Série A	0	0	0	0	0	0	—		—		0	0
Coritiba	2015	Série A	0	0	0	0	0	0	—		—		0	0
Coritiba	Total		0	0	0	0	0	0	—		—		0	0
Tupi (loan)	2013	Série C	0	0	5	0	—		—		—		5	0
Junior Team (loan)	2013	Paranaense Série Prata	—		10	0	—		—		—		10	0
Maringá (loan)	2015	Paranaense	0	0	9	0	1	0	—		—		10	0
Ceará	2016	Série B	0	0	0	0	0	0	—		0	0	0	0
Ferroviária	2016	Paulista	—		0	0	0	0	—		3 (Note: Appearance(s) in Copa Paulista)	0	3	0
Ferroviária	2017	Paulista	—		7	0	0	0	—		23	0	30	0
Ferroviária	2018	Série D	0	0	14	1	—		—		—		14	1
Ferroviária	2019	Série D	0	0	13	0	—		—		—		13	0
Ferroviária	Total		0	0	34	1	0	0	—		26	0	60	1
Oeste (loan)	2018	Série B	37	0	—		0	0	—		—		37	0
Goiás	2019	Série A	37	0	—		0	0	—		1 (Note: Appearance(s) in Copa Verde)	0	38	0
Goiás	2020	Série A	32	0	6	0	4	0	2 (Note: Appearance(s) in Copa Sudamericana)	0	—		44	0
Goiás	2021	Série B	38	0	10	0	0	0	—		—		48	0
Goiás	2022	Série A	38	0	16	0	6	0	—		—		60	0
Goiás	2023	Série A	35	0	17	0	2	0	7	0	4	0	65	0
Goiás	Total		180	0	49	0	12	0	9	0	5	0	255	0
Career total			221	0	107	1	13	0	9	0	31	0	377	1

=== List of goals scored ===
Following, is the list with the goals scored by Tadeu:

#	Date	Venue	Host team	Result	Away team	Competition	Score	Type	Opponent goalkeeper	Ref.
1	24 March 2018	Fonte Luminosa, Araraquara	Ferroviária	3–1	Red Bull Brasil	2018 Campeão do Interior	3–1	Penalty kick	Júlio César	
2	12 August 2024	Serrinha, Goiânia	Goiás	2–1	Ceará	2024 Campeonato Brasileiro Série B	1–1	Penalty kick	Richard	
3	12 August 2024	Serrinha, Goiânia	Goiás	2–1	Ceará	2024 Campeonato Brasileiro Série B	2–1	Penalty kick	Richard	
4	21 August 2024	Serrinha, Goiânia	Goiás	4–1	Brusque	2024 Campeonato Brasileiro Série B	1–0	Penalty kick	Matheus Nogueira	
5	21 October 2024	Arena Condá, Chapecó	Chapecoense	0–4	Goiás	2024 Campeonato Brasileiro Série B	0–2	Penalty kick	Léo Vieira	
6	15 January 2025	Divino Garcia Rosa, Goiatuba	Goiatuba	2–1	Goiás	2025 Campeonato Goiano	2–1	Penalty kick	João Paulo	
7	25 January 2025	Jonas Duarte, Anápolis	Anápolis	0–1	Goiás	2025 Campeonato Goiano	0–1	Penalty kick	Paulo Henrique	
8	6 February 2025	Serrinha, Goiânia	Goiás	6–0	Rio Branco-ES	2025 Copa Verde	4–0	Penalty kick	Neguet	
9	16 February 2025	Valdeir José de Oliveira, Goianésia	Goianésia	1–1	Goiás	2025 Campeonato Goiano	0–1	Penalty kick	Dida	
10	12 March 2025	Serejão, Taguatinga	Brasiliense	3–3	Goiás	2025 Copa Verde	2–2	Penalty kick	Matheus Kayser	
11	29 June 2025	Arena Condá, Chapecó	Chapecoense	1–2	Goiás	2025 Campeonato Brasileiro Série B	1–1	Penalty kick	Rafael Santos	
12	11 March 2026	Serrinha, Goiânia	Goiás	3–0	Fluminense-PI	2026 Copa do Brasil	1–0	Penalty kick	Mauro Iguatu	
13	22 March 2026	Serrinha, Goiânia	Goiás	3–1	América Mineiro	2026 Campeonato Brasileiro Série B	2–0	Penalty kick	Gustavo	

== Honours ==
Coritiba

- Campeonato Paranaense: 2013

Ferroviária

- Copa Paulista: 2017

Goiás

- Copa Verde: 2023
- Campeonato Goiano: 2026

=== Individual ===
- Campeonato Goiano Best XI: 2023
