= Pedro Junqueira =

Brazilian footballer

Personal information
- Full name: Pedro Junqueira de Oliveira
- Date of birth: 23 March 2004 (age 22)
- Place of birth: Nerópolis, Brazil
- Height: 1.75 m (5 ft 9 in)
- Position: Forward

Team information
- Current team: Goiás
- Number: 17

Youth career
- 2017–2023: Goiás

Senior career*
Years	Team	Apps	(Gls)
2022–	Goiás	91	(3)
- * Club domestic league appearances and goals as of 16 November 2026

Pedro Junqueira de Oliveira (born 23 March 2004), known as Pedro Junqueira or just Pedrinho, is a Brazilian professional footballer who plays as a forward for Goiás.

== Club career ==
Born in Nerópolis, Goiás, Pedro Junqueira joined Goiás' youth setup in 2017. On 10 March 2022, renewed his contract until January 2025.

Pedro Junqueira made his first team – and Série A – debut on 28 May 2022, coming on as a second-half substitute for Reynaldo in a 1–1 home draw against Red Bull Bragantino.

== Career statistics ==
As of 27 September 2023

Club	Season	League			State League		Cup		Continental		Other		Total	
Club	Season	Division	Apps	Goals	Apps	Goals	Apps	Goals	Apps	Goals	Apps	Goals	Apps	Goals
Goiás	2022	Série A	14	0	0	0	0	0	—		—		14	0
Goiás	2023	Série A	1	0	0	0	0	0	0	0	—		1	0
Career total			15	0	0	0	0	0	0	0	0	0	15	0
