= Rodrigo Andrade (footballer, born 1997) =

Brazilian footballer

Personal information
- Full name: José Rodrigo Andrade Ramos
- Date of birth: 3 February 1997 (age 29)
- Place of birth: Belém, Brazil
- Height: 1.74 m (5 ft 8 1/2 in)
- Position: Defensive midfielder

Team information
- Current team: São Bernardo
- Number: 32

Youth career
- 2011–2016: Paysandu

Senior career*
Years	Team	Apps	(Gls)
2016–2017	Paysandu	67	(7)
2018–2024	Vitória	125	(4)
2020–2021	→ CSA (loan)	7	(0)
2021–2022	→ Guarani (loan)	73	(2)
2024	Mirassol	12	(0)
2025	Goiás	21	(2)
2026–	São Bernardo	2	(0)
- * Club domestic league appearances and goals as of 16 April 2026

José Rodrigo Andrade Ramos (born 3 February 1997), known as Rodrigo Andrade, is a Brazilian footballer who plays as defensive midfielder for São Bernardo.

== Club career ==
=== Paysandu ===
Rodrigo Andrade was a Paysandu youth graduate, and was promoted to the first team in December 2015. He made his senior debut on 27 March 2016, coming on as a first-half substitute and scoring the second in a 3–0 Copa Verde home win against Fast Clube.

Rodrigo Andrade made his Série B debut on 14 May 2016, starting in a 2–2 away draw against Ceará. After featuring in 14 league matches, he signed a contract extension until 2020 on 25 January 2017.

=== Vitória ===
On 7 February 2018, Rodrigo Andrade signed a three-year contract with Série A side Vitória, which bought 50% of his federative rights.

== Career statistics ==
As of 16 February 2024

Club	Season	League			State League		Cup		Continental		Other		Total	
Club	Season	Division	Apps	Goals	Apps	Goals	Apps	Goals	Apps	Goals	Apps	Goals	Apps	Goals
Paysandu	2016	Série B	14	0	4	0	2	0	—		3 (Note: All appearance(s) in Copa Verde)	2	23	2
Paysandu	2017	Série B	25	4	10	1	2	0	—		7	0	44	5
Paysandu	Total		39	4	14	1	4	0	—		10	2	67	7
Vitória	2018	Série A	22	0	4	0	2	0	—		2 (Note: All appearance(s) in Copa do Nordeste)	0	30	0
Vitória	2019	Série B	12	0	6	0	1	0	—		5	0	24	0
Vitória	2020	Série B	5	0	0	0	2	0	—		6	0	13	0
Vitória	2023	Série B	25	2	7	0	0	0	—		6	1	38	3
Vitória	2024	Série A	0	0	2	0	0	0	—		0	0	2	0
Vitória	Total		64	2	19	0	5	0	—		19	1	107	3
CSA (loan)	2020	Série B	6	0	—		—		—		1	0	7	0
Guarani (loan)	2021	Série B	25	0	11	1	—		—		—		36	1
Guarani (loan)	2022	Série B	25	1	10	0	2	0	—		—		37	1
Guarani (loan)	Total		50	1	21	1	2	0	—		—		73	2
Career total			153	7	54	2	11	0	0	0	29	3	247	12

== Honours ==
Paysandu

- Campeonato Paraense: 2016
- Copa Verde: 2016

Vitória

- Campeonato Brasileiro Série B: 2023
