= Lucas Ribeiro (footballer, born 1999) =

Brazilian footballer (born 1999)

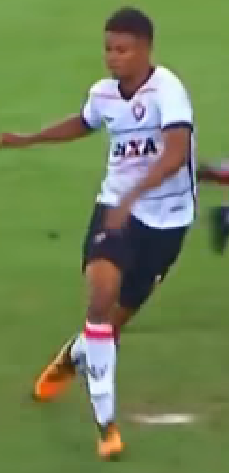
- Ribeiro during his debut for Vitória in 2018

Personal information
- Full name: Lucas Ribeiro dos Santos
- Date of birth: 19 January 1999 (age 27)
- Place of birth: Salvador, Brazil
- Height: 1.90 m (6 ft 3 in)
- Position: Centre-back

Team information
- Current team: Goiás
- Number: 14

Youth career
- 2015–2018: Vitória

Senior career*
Years	Team	Apps	(Gls)
2018	Vitória	16	(0)
2019–2023	TSG Hoffenheim	2	(1)
2020–2021	→ Internacional (loan)	27	(1)
2022–2023	→ Ceará (loan)	9	(1)
2023–2024	Ceará	9	(0)
2024–	Goiás	105	(3)

International career
2018–2019	Brazil U20	9	(2)
- * Club domestic league appearances and goals as of 16 November 2026

Lucas Ribeiro dos Santos (born 19 January 1999) is a Brazilian professional footballer who plays as a centre-back for Campeonato Brasileiro Série B club Goiás.

== Club career ==
=== Vitória ===
Born in Salvador, Bahia, Ribeiro graduated from the youth academy of Vitória (after joining at the age of 16) and was promoted to the senior team in 2018.

On 23 August, he made his first team debut, playing the whole ninety minutes of a 1–0 defeat against Flamengo. Eight days later, he extended his contract until 2021.

=== TSG Hoffenheim ===
On 28 January 2019, Ribeiro joined German club TSG Hoffenheim and signed a contract until the summer of 2023.

=== Internacional ===
He played only two games for Hoffenheim before joining Internacional on loan.

=== Ceará ===
On 18 January 2022, Ribeiro was loaned to Ceará for 2022 season.

== International career ==
In October 2018, Ribeiro was called up to the Brazil under-20 for friendlies against Chile. On 13 December 2018, he was included in the under-20 team for the 2019 South American U-20 Championship.

== Career statistics ==
As of 29 November 2021

Appearances and goals by club, season and competition
Club	Season	League			State League		Cup		Continental		Other		Total	
Club	Season	Division	Apps	Goals	Apps	Goals	Apps	Goals	Apps	Goals	Apps	Goals	Apps	Goals
Vitória	2018	Série A	16	0	—		—		—		—		16	0
TSG Hoffenheim	2019–20	Bundesliga	2	1	—		1	0	—		—		3	1
Internacional (loan)	2020	Série A	13	0	—		0	0	1	0	—		14	0
Internacional (loan)	2021	Série A	7	0	7	0	2	0	3	0	—		19	0
Internacional (loan)	Total		20	0	7	0	2	0	4	0	—		33	0
Career total			38	1	7	0	3	0	4	0	0	0	52	1
