= Welliton (footballer, born 2000) =

Brazilian footballer

Personal information
- Full name: Welliton Silva de Azevedo Matheus
- Date of birth: 14 July 2000 (age 26)
- Place of birth: Rio de Janeiro, Brazil
- Height: 1.80 m (5 ft 11 in)
- Position: Forward

Team information
- Current team: Fortaleza (on loan from Primavera)
- Number: 31

Youth career
- 2015: Vasco da Gama
- 2016–2019: Corinthians
- 2019–2020: Oeste

Senior career*
Years	Team	Apps	(Gls)
2019–2020	Oeste	19	(0)
2021	Red Bull Brasil	14	(0)
2022–2023	Red Bull Bragantino	9	(0)
2023	→ ABC (loan)	21	(1)
2024–	Primavera	15	(4)
2024	→ Goiás (loan)	35	(3)
2025	→ Goiás (loan)	40	(2)
2026–	→ Fortaleza (loan)	0	(0)
- * Club domestic league appearances and goals as of 11 March 2026

Welliton Silva de Azevedo Matheus (born 14 July 2000), simply known as Welliton, is a Brazilian footballer who plays as a forward for Fortaleza on loan from Primavera.

== Club career ==
Born in Rio de Janeiro, Welliton joined Corinthians' youth setup in 2015, from Vasco da Gama. On 3 July 2019, after being rarely used in the under-20 squad, he terminated his contract and joined Oeste.

Welliton made his first team debut for Oeste on 31 August 2019, coming on as a late substitute for Bruno Lopes in a 0–0 Série B home draw against Sport Recife. He featured sparingly for the side in the following two years, suffering two relegations during the 2020 season.

On 8 March 2021, Welliton joined Red Bull Bragantino and was initially assigned to reserve team Red Bull Brasil. He made his first team debut for Braga on 20 March of the following year, replacing Helinho in a 1–1 Campeonato Paulista home draw against Palmeiras.

== Career statistics ==
As of 22 February 2023.

Club	Season	League			State League		Cup		Continental		Other		Total	
Club	Season	Division	Apps	Goals	Apps	Goals	Apps	Goals	Apps	Goals	Apps	Goals	Apps	Goals
Oeste	2019	Série B	6	0	—		—		—		—		6	0
Oeste	2020	Série B	12	0	1	0	0	0	—		—		13	0
Oeste	Total		18	0	1	0	0	0	—		—		19	0
Red Bull Brasil	2021	Paulista A2	—		14	0	—		—		—		14	0
Red Bull Bragantino	2022	Série A	6	0	1	0	0	0	0	0	—		7	0
Red Bull Bragantino	2023	Série A	0	0	2	0	0	0	0	0	—		2	0
Red Bull Bragantino	Total		6	0	3	0	0	0	0	0	—		9	0
Career total			24	0	18	0	0	0	0	0	0	0	42	0
