= Marcão (footballer, born 1991) =

Brazilian footballer

Personal information
- Full name: Marcos Antonio Almeida Silva
- Date of birth: 14 January 1991 (age 35)
- Place of birth: Riacho de Santana, Brazil
- Height: 1.85 m (6 ft 1 in)
- Position: Defensive midfielder

Team information
- Current team: São Bernardo
- Number: 77

Youth career
- –2009: Atlético Paranaense
- 2010–2011: Nacional

Senior career*
Years	Team	Apps	(Gls)
2012–2014	Nacional-MG	26	(0)
2013	→ Araxá (loan)	5	(0)
2014	Boa Esporte	5	(0)
2015	Criciúma	19	(0)
2016	Linense	8	(0)
2016	Brasil de Pelotas	18	(0)
2017	Botafogo-SP	13	(0)
2017	Atético Goianiense	22	(0)
2018	Linense	11	(1)
2018	Cuiabá	12	(0)
2018	Sport Recife	15	(0)
2019	Emirates Club	13	(2)
2019–2021	Sport Recife	85	(3)
2022	Cuiabá	26	(0)
2023–2024	Hanoi	17	(1)
2024–2025	Goiás	68	(8)
2026–	São Bernardo	31	(0)
- * Club domestic league appearances and goals as of 18 November 2026

Marcos Antonio Almeida Silva (born 14 January 1991), commonly known as Marcão, is a Brazilian professional footballer who plays as a defensive midfielder for São Bernardo.

== Club career ==
Marcão started his career playing with Nacional. He made his professional debut during the 2012 season.

On 1 February 2023, Marcão signed for V.League 1 club Hanoi and was given the number 77 shirt. He made his competitive debut for the club in a 1–1 away league draw with Viettel FC four days later. Marcão scored his first goal for Hanoi in a 2–2 away league draw against Hong Linh Ha Tinh on 22 July 2023.

== Career statistics ==
As of match played 2 February 2025

Appearances and goals by club, season and competition
Club	Season	League			State league		National cup (Note: Includes Copa do Brasil, UAE President's Cup, Vietnamese Cup)		Continental		Other		Total	
Club	Season	Division	Apps	Goals	Apps	Goals	Apps	Goals	Apps	Goals	Apps	Goals	Apps	Goals
Nacional-MG	2012	Série D	0	0	8 (Note: Appearance(s) in Campeonato Mineiro)	0	—		—		—		8	0
Nacional-MG	2013	—			8	0	—		—		—		8	0
Nacional-MG	2014	—			10	0	—		—		—		10	0
Nacional-MG	Total		0	0	26	0	0	0	0	0	0	0	26	0
Araxá (loan)	2013	Série D	5	0	0	0	—		—		—		5	0
Boa Esporte	2014	Série B	5	0	0	0	—		—		—		5	0
Criciúma	2015	Série B	19	0	0	0	2	0	—		—		21	0
Linense	2016	Série D	0	0	8 (Note: Appearance(s) in Campeonato Paulista)	0	2	0	—		—		10	0
Brasil de Pelotas	2016	Série B	18	0	0	0	0	0	—		—		18	0
Botafogo-SP	2017	Série C	0	0	13	0	—		—		—		13	0
Atlético Goianiense	2017	Série A	22	0	0	0	2	0	—		—		24	0
Linense	2018	Série D	0	0	11	1	—		—		—		11	0
Cuiabá	2018	Série C	12	0	0	0	0	0	—		—		12	0
Sport Recife	2018	Série A	15	0	0	0	0	0	—		—		15	0
Emirates Club	2018-19	UAE Pro League	13	2	—		0	0	—		0	0	13	2
Sport Recife	2019	Série B	10	0	0	0	0	0	—		0	0	10	0
Sport Recife	2020	Série A	26	2	1 (Note: Appearance(s) in Campeonato Pernambucano)	0	0	0	—		0	0	27	2
Sport Recife	2021	Série A	34	1	9	0	1	0	—		5 (Note: Appearance(s) in Copa do Nordeste)	0	49	1
Sport Recife	Total		70	3	10	0	1	0	0	0	5	0	86	3
Cuiabá	2022	Série A	26	0	0	0	1	0	3 (Note: Appearance(s) in Copa Sudamericana)	0	0	0	30	0
Hanoi	2023	V.League 1	15	1	—		0	0	—		—		15	1
Hanoi	2023-24	V.League 1	4	0	—		0	0	4 (Note: Appearance(s) in AFC Champions League)	0	—		8	0
Hanoi	Total		19	1	—		0	0	4	0	0	0	23	1
Goiás	2024	Série B	34	7	0	0	3	0	—		0	0	37	7
Goiás	2025	Série B	0	0	5 (Note: Appearance(s) in Campeonato Goiano)	0	0	0	—		0	0	5	0
Goiás	Total		34	7	5	0	3	0	0	0	0	0	42	7
Career total			258	13	73	1	11	0	7	0	5	0	354	14
