= Douglas Teixeira =

Brazilian footballer (born 2001)

Personal information
- Full name: Douglas da Silva Teixeira
- Date of birth: 29 March 2001 (age 25)
- Place of birth: Tucuruí, Brazil
- Height: 1.81 m (5 ft 11 in)
- Position: Left back

Team information
- Current team: Avaí (on loan from Barra)
- Number: 36

Youth career
- Resende

Senior career*
Years	Team	Apps	(Gls)
2020–2023	Resende	32	(1)
2022–2023	→ Botafogo (loan)	1	(0)
2023	→ Barra (loan)	0	(0)
2024–	Barra	23	(1)
2024–2025	→ Goiás (loan)	17	(0)
2025–	→ Avaí (loan)	55	(1)
- * Club domestic league appearances and goals as of 18 November 2026

Douglas da Silva Teixeira (born 29 March 2001), known as Douglas Teixeira or DG, is a Brazilian footballer who plays as a left back for Avaí, on loan from Barra.

== Club career ==
A Resende youth graduate, DG made his first team debut on 28 June 2020, coming on as a late substitute in a 2–0 Campeonato Carioca away win over Madureira. On 4 February 2022, he signed a new three-year contract with the club.

DG scored his first senior goal on 20 March 2022, netting a last-minute winner in a 1–0 away success over Portuguesa-RJ. On 11 April, he moved on loan to Botafogo, being initially assigned to the under-23 squad.

DG made his first team debut for Bota on 14 July 2022, playing the last 15 minutes in a 2–0 home loss against América Mineiro.

== Career statistics ==
As of 27 July 2025.

Club	Season	League			State League		Cup		Continental		Other		Total	
Club	Season	Division	Apps	Goals	Apps	Goals	Apps	Goals	Apps	Goals	Apps	Goals	Apps	Goals
Resende	2020	Carioca	—		1	0	—		—		—		1	0
Resende	2021	Carioca	—		0	0	—		—		4 (Note: Appearance(s) in Copa Rio)	0	4	0
Resende	2022	Carioca	—		13	1	—		—		—		13	1
Resende	2023	Série D	9	0	9	0	—		—		—		16	0
Resende	Total		9	0	23	1	—		—		4	0	36	1
Botafogo (loan)	2022	Série A	1	0	—		1	0	—		—		2	0
Botafogo (loan)	2023	Série A	0	0	0	0	0	0	—		—		0	0
Botafogo (loan)	Total		1	0	0	0	1	0	—		—		2	0
Barra-SC	2023	Catarinense	—		—		—		—		9 (Note: Appearance(s) in Copa Santa Catarina)	0	9	0
Barra-SC	2024	Série D	12	1	11	0	—		—		—		23	1
Barra-SC	Total		12	1	11	0	—		—		9	0	32	1
Goiás (loan)	2024	Série B	8	0	—		—		—		—		8	0
Goiás (loan)	2025	Série B	2	0	7	0	0	0	—		4 (Note: Appearance(s) in Copa Verde)	0	13	0
Goiás (loan)	Total		10	0	7	0	0	0	—		4	0	21	0
Avaí (loan)	2025	Série B	1	0	—		—		—		—		1	0
Career total			33	1	41	1	1	0	0	0	17	0	92	2
