= Gonzalo Freitas =

Uruguayan footballer (born 1991)

Personal information
- Full name: Gonzalo Gastón Freitas Silva
- Date of birth: 2 October 1991 (age 35)
- Place of birth: Montevideo, Uruguay
- Height: 1.86 m (6 ft 1 in)
- Position: Midfielder

Team information
- Current team: Goiás
- Number: 5

Senior career*
Years	Team	Apps	(Gls)
2011–2013	Bella Vista	37	(2)
2013–2018	Liverpool Montevideo	98	(8)
2017–2018	→ Atlético Tucumán (loan)	16	(1)
2018–2021	Peñarol	8	(0)
2019	→ Everton de Viña del Mar (loan)	18	(2)
2020–2021	→ Deportes Antofagasta (loan)	18	(1)
2021–2022	Mazatlán	20	(0)
2022–2024	Defensor Sporting	46	(2)
2024	Montevideo Wanderers	14	(4)
2024	Atlético Goianiense	15	(0)
2025–	Goiás	30	(1)
- * Club domestic league appearances and goals as of 16 December 2025

Gonzalo Gastón Freitas Silva (born 2 October 1991) is a Uruguayan professional footballer who plays as a midfielder for Brazilian club Goiás.

== Career ==
Freitas' senior career started with Bella Vista of the Uruguayan Primera División. He made his professional debut in the 2011 Copa Sudamericana, it came in a first stage first leg against Universidad Católica on 2 August. His league debut came just over a month later in a home loss to Cerrito. He made thirteen appearances in his debut season. Twenty-four followed in the following season, 2012–13, as well as two goals, including his career first versus Progreso on 29 September 2012. Bella Vista were relegated in 2012–13, Freitas subsequently joined top-flight Liverpool. He played twenty-one times as they were relegated.

In the Uruguayan Segunda División, Freitas scored five goals in twenty-four games as Liverpool won the title and promotion back to the Primera División. Three goals in fifty-three matches followed in the next three seasons with Liverpool in the top-flight. On 18 July 2017, Freitas left Uruguayan football to join Argentine Primera División side Atlético Tucumán on loan. He returned to Liverpool a year later but was soon sold to Peñarol. Freitas was loaned to the Chilean Primera División's Everton in January 2019.

== Personal life ==
Freitas' brother, Nicolás, is also a footballer.

== Career statistics ==
As of 6 January 2019.

Club statistics
Club	Season	League			Cup (Note: Includes the Copa Argentina)		League Cup		Continental (Note: Includes the Copa Sudamericana)		Other		Total	
Club	Season	Division	Apps	Goals	Apps	Goals	Apps	Goals	Apps	Goals	Apps	Goals	Apps	Goals
Bella Vista	2011–12	Uruguayan Primera División	13	0	—		—		1 (Note: One appearance in 2011 Copa Sudamericana)	0	0	0	14	0
Bella Vista	2012–13	Uruguayan Primera División	24	2	—		—		—		0	0	24	2
Bella Vista	Total		37	2	—		—		1	0	0	0	38	2
Liverpool	2013–14	Uruguayan Primera División	21	0	—		—		—		0	0	21	0
Liverpool	2014–15	Uruguayan Segunda División	24	5	—		—		—		0	0	24	5
Liverpool	2015–16	Uruguayan Primera División	25	0	—		—		—		0	0	25	0
Liverpool	2016	Uruguayan Primera División	12	1	—		—		—		0	0	12	1
Liverpool	2017	Uruguayan Primera División	16	2	—		—		1 (Note: One appearance in 2017 Copa Sudamericana)	0	0	0	17	2
Liverpool	2018	Uruguayan Primera División	0	0	—		—		—		0	0	0	0
Liverpool	Total		98	8	—		—		1	0	0	0	99	8
Atlético Tucumán (loan)	2017–18	Argentine Primera División	16	1	3	1	—		1 (Note: One appearance in 2018 Copa Libertadores)	0	0	0	20	2
Peñarol	2018	Uruguayan Primera División	8	0	0	0	—		2 (Note: Two appearances in 2018 Copa Sudamericana)	0	0	0	10	0
Peñarol	2019	Uruguayan Primera División	0	0	0	0	—		0	0	0	0	0	0
Peñarol	Total		159	11	3	1	—		5	0	0	0	167	12
Everton (loan)	2019	Chilean Primera División	0	0	0	0	—		—		0	0	0	0
Career total			159	11	3	1	—		5	0	0	0	167	12

== Honours ==
Liverpool

- Uruguayan Segunda División: 2014–15

Peñarol

- Uruguayan Primera División: 2018
