= Matías Cavalleri =

Chilean footballer (born 1998)

Personal information
- Full name: Matías Cavalleri Lopetegui
- Date of birth: 8 April 1998 (age 28)
- Place of birth: Vitacura, Santiago, Chile
- Height: 1.68 m (5 ft 6 in)
- Position: Forward

Team information
- Current team: Deportes Concepción
- Number: 24

Youth career
- Universidad Católica
- Newell's Old Boys

Senior career*
Years	Team	Apps	(Gls)
2018–2020	Curicó Unido	50	(6)
2021–2024	Unión La Calera	77	(12)
2021	→ Palestino (loan)	7	(0)
2025	Paysandu	6	(1)
2025	→ CSA (loan)	5	(0)
2026–	Deportes Concepción	0	(0)

International career^{‡}
- Chile U17
- Chile U20
2020	Chile U23	3	(0)
- * Club domestic league appearances and goals as of 14 December 2025 ‡ National team caps and goals as of 25 January 2020

Matías Cavalleri Lopetegui (born 8 April 1998) is a Chilean professional footballer who plays as a forward for Deportes Concepción.

== Club career ==
Cavalleri had a period with the Universidad Católica academy, prior to joining the ranks of Newell's Old Boys. In 2018, Chilean Primera División side Curicó Unido signed Cavalleri. He made his professional debut on 11 February, starting a home league defeat to ex-club Universidad Católica though was later substituted off at the interval. Cavalleri netted his first goals in May 2019 against Audax Italiano and Palestino. In 2021, he switched to Unión La Calera.

Cavalleri moved abroad for the 2025 season and signed with Paysandu in the Brazilian Série B. In June of the same year, he was loaned out to Centro Sportivo Alagoano until the end of the season. He returned to Chile at the end of the year.

Back to Chile, Cavalleri joined Deportes Concepción on 18 December 2025.

== International career ==
Cavalleri has previously represented Chile at U17 and U20 level and Chile U23 at the 2020 Pre-Olympic Tournament.

He was called up to some senior team training microcycles in April 2019 and 2020.

== Personal life ==
He is the nephew of Fernando "Palito" Cavalleri, died in 2017, an Argentine naturalized Chilean football player and manager who had a long career in Chile and other countries.

== Career statistics ==
As of 28 May 2019.

Club statistics
Club	Season	League			Cup		Continental		Other		Total	
Club	Season	Division	Apps	Goals	Apps	Goals	Apps	Goals	Apps	Goals	Apps	Goals
Curicó Unido	2018	Primera División	10	0	2	0	—		0	0	12	0
Curicó Unido	2019	Primera División	9	2	0	0	—		0	0	9	2
Career total			19	2	2	0	—		0	0	21	2
