= 2023 Paysandu Sport Club season =

Paysandu
2023 season
- Chairman: Maurício Ettinger
- Manager: Márcio Fernandes; Wilton Bezerra (c); Marquinhos Santos; Hélio dos Anjos
- Stadium: Estádio da Curuzu; Mangueirão
- Série C: 3rd
- Campeonato Paraense: 3rd
- Copa Verde: Runners-up
- Copa do Brasil: Third round
- Top goalscorer: League: Mário Sérgio (9); All: Mário Sérgio (22)

The 2023 season was Paysandu's 110th season in the club's history. Paysandu competed in the Campeonato Paraense, Copa Verde, Série C and Copa do Brasil.

== Current squad ==
As of 31 January 2023

Note: Flags indicate national team as defined under FIFA eligibility rules; some limited exceptions apply. Players may hold more than one non-FIFA nationality.

No.	Pos.	Nation	Player
1	GK	BRA	Thiago Coelho
2	DF	BRA	Igor Bosel
3	DF	COL	Oswaldo Henríquez
4	DF	BRA	Wanderson
5	MF	BRA	Paulo Henrique
6	DF	BRA	Eltinho
8	MF	BRA	Ricardinho
9	FW	BRA	Mário Sérgio
10	MF	VEN	Robert Hernández
11	MF	BRA	Fernando Gabriel
12	DF	BRA	Juan
14	MF	BRA	Éric
15	MF	BRA	Rithely
16	MF	BRA	João Vieira
17	MF	PAR	Jorge Jiménez
18	GK	BRA	Victor Souza
19	MF	BRA	Gabriel Davis

No.	Pos.	Nation	Player
20	FW	BRA	Vicente
21	MF	BRA	Bileu
22	DF	BRA	Samuel Santos
23	GK	BRA	Cláudio Vitor
25	FW	BRA	Bruno Alves
26	DF	BRA	Lucas Marreiros
27	FW	BRA	Dalberto
28	FW	BRA	Alex Matos (on loan from Cruzeiro)
29	FW	BRA	Stefano Pinho
30	DF	BRA	Genílson
31	DF	BRA	Naylhor
32	DF	BRA	Thiaguinho
34	MF	BRA	Júlio Cézar
35	DF	BRA	Juan Pitbull
36	MF	BRA	Rikelton
37	FW	BRA	Roger
38	MF	BRA	João Pedro
40	GK	BRA	Gabriel Bernard

== Statistics ==
=== Overall ===
Games played	48 (14 Campeonato Paraense, 7 Copa Verde, 2 Copa do Brasil, 25 Série C)
Games won	22 (9 Campeonato Paraense, 2 Copa Verde, 0 Copa do Brasil, 11 Série C)
Games drawn	11 (3 Campeonato Paraense, 2 Copa Verde, 0 Copa do Brasil, 6 Série C)
Games lost	15 (2 Campeonato Paraense, 3 Copa Verde, 2 Copa do Brasil, 8 Série C)
Goals scored	59
Goals conceded	57
Goal difference	+2
Best results (goal difference)	4–1 (A) v Tuna Luso - Campeonato Paraense - 2023.04.16
Worst result (goal difference)	0–5 (A) v Ypiranga - Série C - 2023.05.11
Top scorer	Mário Sérgio (22)

Source: Paysandu official website

=== Goalscorers ===
Place	Position	Nationality	Number	Name	Campeonato Paraense	Copa Verde	Copa do Brasil	Série C	Total
1	FW	(Brazil)	9	Mário Sérgio	10	3	0	9	22
2	FW	(Brazil)	19	Vinícius Leite	2	0	0	3	5
3	FW	(Brazil)	25	Bruno Alves	3	0	0	1	4
4	MF	(Brazil)	16	João Vieira	2	0	0	1	3
5	DF	(Brazil)	6	Eltinho	2	0	0	0	2
=	DF	(Brazil)	36	Kevyn Lucas	0	0	0	2	2
=	FW	(Brazil)	30	Nicolas Careca	0	0	0	2	2
=	MF	(Brazil)	20	Robinho	0	0	0	2	2
6	FW	(Brazil)	27	Dalberto	1	0	0	0	1
=	DF	(Brazil)	2	Edílson	0	0	0	1	1
=	MF	(Brazil)	11	Fernando Gabriel	0	1	0	0	1
=	DF	(Brazil)	2	Igor Bosel	1	0	0	0	1
=	MF	(Brazil)	22	Jacy Maranhão	0	0	0	1	1
=	DF	(Brazil)	31	Naylhor	1	0	0	0	1
=	MF	(Brazil)	27	Nenê Bonilha	0	0	0	1	1
=	DF	(Colombia)	3	Oswaldo Henríquez	1	0	0	0	1
=	DF	(Brazil)	3	Paulão	0	0	0	1	1
=	MF	(Brazil)	8	Ricardinho	1	0	0	0	1
=	MF	(Venezuela)	10	Robert Hernández	1	0	0	0	1
=	FW	(Brazil)	37	Roger	0	0	0	1	1
=	MF	(Brazil)	15	Ronaldo Mendes	0	0	0	1	1
=	FW	(Brazil)	29	Stefano Pinho	0	1	0	0	1
=	DF	(Brazil)	4	Wanderson	0	0	0	1	1
=	DF	(Brazil)	3	Wellington Carvalho	0	0	0	1	1
				Own goals	0	1	0	0	1
				Total	25	6	0	28	59

=== Managers performance ===
Name	Nationality	From	To	P	W	D	L	GF	GA	Avg%
Márcio Fernandes	Brazil	9 February 2023	29 April 2023	19	10	4	5	27	20	59%
Wilton Bezerra (caretaker)	Brazil	3 May 2023	3 May 2023	1	1	0	0	2	1	100%
Marquinhos Santos	Brazil	8 May 2023	27 June 2023	13	3	4	6	11	21	33%
Hélio dos Anjos	Brazil	1 July 2023	7 October 2023	15	8	3	4	19	15	60%

== Official Competitions ==
=== Campeonato Paraense ===
==== First Stage ====
9 February 2023 1	Paysandu	3–1	Itupiranga	Belém
20:00 (UTC-3)	Mário Sérgio 15' (pen.), 32'; Robert Hernández 83'	Report	Fabinho 31'	Stadium: Estádio Leônidas Sodré de Castro (Curuzu); Attendance: 10,063; Referee: Joelson Nazareno Ferreira Cardoso

14 February 2023 2	Tapajós	0–2	Paysandu	Belém
20:00 (UTC-3)		Report	Bruno Alves 32'; Igor Bosel 82'	Stadium: Estádio Leônidas Sodré de Castro (Curuzu); Attendance: 5,024; Referee: Fernando Antônio Mendes de Salles Nascimento Filho

25 February 2023 3	Paysandu	2–1	Castanhal	Belém
19:00 (UTC-3)	Mário Sérgio 9'; Bruno Alves 29'	Report	Jefferson Murillo 7'	Stadium: Estádio Leônidas Sodré de Castro (Curuzu); Attendance: 5,193; Referee: Marco José Soares de Almeida

28 February 2023 4	Paysandu	1–0	Bragantino	Belém
20:00 (UTC-3)	Mário Sérgio 86'	Report		Stadium: Estádio Leônidas Sodré de Castro (Curuzu); Attendance: 4,806; Referee: Elerson Fernandes da Silva

4 March 2023 5	Caeté	2–1	Paysandu	Ipixuna do Pará
15:30 (UTC-3)	Leandro Cearense 39'; PC Timborana 86'	Report	Henríquez 82'	Stadium: Estádio Municipal de Ipixuna; Attendance: 1,680; Referee: Klever da Costa Lobo

12 March 2023 6	Independente	3–3	Paysandu	Tucuruí
16:00 (UTC-3)	Lopeu 14' (pen.); Bruno 23' (pen.); Flávio 76'	Report	Mário Sérgio 33', 63' (pen.); João Vieira 90+6'	Stadium: Estádio Municipal Antônio Dias; Attendance: 1,810; Referee: Alexandre Expedito Vieira da Silva Júnior

18 March 2023 7	Paysandu	2–1	Tuna Luso	Belém
17:00 (UTC-3)	Eltinho 7'; Ricardinho 37'	Report	Paulo Rangel 9'	Stadium: Estádio Leônidas Sodré de Castro (Curuzu); Attendance: 5,741; Referee: Olivaldo José Alves Moraes

9 April 2023 8	Remo	0–1	Paysandu	Belém
17:00 (UTC-3)		Report	Vinícius Leite 50'	Stadium: Estádio Estadual Jornalista Edgar Augusto Proença (Mangueirão); Attendance: 34,243; Referee: Olivaldo José Alves Moraes

==== Quarter-finals ====
16 April 2023	Tuna Luso	1–4	Paysandu	Belém
18:00 (UTC-3)	Welthon 67'	Report	Vinícius Leite 1'; Mário Sérgio 17'; Eltinho 22'; João Vieira 43'	Stadium: Estádio Estadual Jornalista Edgar Augusto Proença (Mangueirão); Attendance: 7,989; Referee: Marco José Soares de Almeida

19 April 2023	Paysandu	1–1	Tuna Luso	Belém
20:00 (UTC-3)	Mário Sérgio 45+1'	Report	Welthon 18'	Stadium: Estádio Leônidas Sodré de Castro (Curuzu); Attendance: 4,322; Referee: Alexandre Expedito Vieira da Silva Júnior

==== Semi-finals ====
22 April 2023	Águia de Marabá	0–1	Paysandu	Marabá
17:00 (UTC-3)		Report	Mário Sérgio 55' (pen.)	Stadium: Estádio Municipal Zinho de Oliveira; Attendance: 2,139; Referee: Klever da Costa Lobo

29 April 2023	Paysandu	1–2 (2–4 p)	Águia de Marabá	Belém
19:00 (UTC-3)	Mário Sérgio 31'	Report	Luan Parede 45'; David Cruz 73' (pen.)	Stadium: Estádio Estadual Jornalista Edgar Augusto Proença (Mangueirão); Referee: Sávio Pereira Sampaio
	Penalties
	Mário Sérgio (penalty scored); Eltinho (penalty missed); Vinícius Leite (penalty scored); Paulo Henrique (penalty missed)		(penalty scored) Balão Marabá; (penalty scored) David Cruz; (penalty scored) Pablo; (penalty scored) Luan Santos

==== Matches for third place ====
14 May 2023	Cametá	1–1	Paysandu	Cametá
16:00 (UTC-3)	Wendel 69'	Report	Naylhor 3'	Stadium: Estádio Municipal Orfelino Martins; Attendance: 454; Referee: Olivaldo José Alves Moraes

24 May 2023	Paysandu	2–0	Cametá	Belém
20:00 (UTC-3)	Dalberto 45+5'; Bruno Alves 53'	Report		Stadium: Estádio Leônidas Sodré de Castro (Curuzu); Referee: Marco José Soares de Almeida

==== Record ====
Final Position	Points	Matches	Wins	Draws	Losses	Goals For	Goals Away	Win%
3rd	30	14	9	3	2	25	13	71%

=== Copa Verde ===
==== Round of 16 ====
22 February 2023	Paysandu	3–0	Real Ariquemes	Belém
20:00 (UTC-3)	Mário Sérgio 9', 58'; Stefano Pinho 40'	Report		Stadium: Estádio Leônidas Sodré de Castro (Curuzu); Attendance: 3,949; Referee: Jefferson Ferreira de Moraes

==== Quarter-finals ====
8 March 2023	Princesa do Solimões	0–0	Paysandu	Manacapuru
21:00 (UTC-4)		Report		Stadium: Estádio Olímpico Municipal Gilberto Mestrinho; Attendance: 1,367; Referee: Jackson Rodrigues da Silva

23 March 2023	Paysandu	0–0 (5–3 p)	Princesa do Solimões	Belém
20:00 (UTC-3)		Report		Stadium: Estádio Leônidas Sodré de Castro (Curuzu); Attendance: 6,997; Referee: Dyorgines Jose Padovani de Andrade
	Penalties
	Mário Sérgio (penalty scored); Eltinho (penalty scored); Bruno Alves (penalty scored); Genílson (penalty scored); Samuel Santos (penalty scored)		(penalty scored) Frank Alberto; (penalty scored) Aleílson; (penalty missed) Foguete; (penalty scored) Jonas Pica-Pau

==== Semi-finals ====
26 March 2023	Paysandu	0–1	Remo	Belém
16:00 (UTC-3)		Report	Muriqui 26'	Stadium: Estádio Estadual Jornalista Edgar Augusto Proença (Mangueirão); Attendance: 22,090; Referee: Wilton Pereira Sampaio

29 March 2023	Remo	1–2 (2–4 p)	Paysandu	Belém
20:00 (UTC-3)	Muriqui 31'	Report	Mário Sérgio 50'; Fernando Gabriel 80'	Stadium: Estádio Estadual Jornalista Edgar Augusto Proença (Mangueirão); Attendance: 24,925; Referee: Dyorgines Jose Padovani de Andrade
	Penalties
	Ícaro (penalty scored); Muriqui (penalty missed); Anderson Uchôa (penalty scored); Rogério (penalty missed)		(penalty scored) Mário Sérgio; (penalty scored) Ricardinho; (penalty missed) Fernando Gabriel; (penalty scored) Paulo Henrique; (penalty scored) Eltinho

==== Finals ====
17 May 2023	Paysandu	0–2	Goiás	Belém
20:00 (UTC-3)		Report	Maguinho 57'; Philippe 88'	Stadium: Estádio Estadual Jornalista Edgar Augusto Proença (Mangueirão); Attendance: 13,607; Referee: Alisson Sidnei Furtado

31 May 2023	Goiás	2–1	Paysandu	Goiânia
20:00 (UTC-3)	Vinícius 7' (pen.); Matheus Peixoto 39' (pen.)	Report	Bruno Melo 54' (o.g.)	Stadium: Estádio Hailé Pinheiro (Serrinha); Attendance: 11,499; Referee: Dyorgines Jose Padovani de Andrade

==== Record ====
Final Position	Points	Matches	Wins	Draws	Losses	Goals For	Goals Away	Win%
2nd	8	7	2	2	3	6	6	38%

=== Copa do Brasil ===
==== Third round ====
12 April 2023	Fluminense	3–0	Paysandu	Rio de Janeiro
19:30 (UTC-3)	Nino 28'; Keno 35'; Felipe Melo 41'	Report		Stadium: Estádio Jornalista Mário Filho (Maracanã); Attendance: 27,856; Referee: Anderson Daronco

25 April 2023	Paysandu	0–3	Fluminense	Belém
20:00 (UTC-3)		Report	Cano 3'; Keno 44'; John Kennedy 72'	Stadium: Estádio Estadual Jornalista Edgar Augusto Proença (Mangueirão); Attendance: 32,681; Referee: Edina Alves Batista

==== Record ====
Final Position	Points	Matches	Wins	Draws	Losses	Goals For	Goals Away	Win%
32nd	0	2	0	0	2	0	6	0%

=== Série C ===
==== First stage ====
Pos	Team	Pld	W	D	L	GF	GA	GD	Pts	Qualification or relegation
5	São José	19	8	7	4	30	21	+9	31	Advance to Second stage
6	Botafogo-PB	19	7	9	3	25	20	+5	30	Advance to Second stage
7	Paysandu	19	8	5	6	21	26	−5	29	Advance to Second stage
8	São Bernardo	19	7	8	4	20	17	+3	29	Advance to Second stage
9	Confiança	19	8	4	7	23	26	−3	28	

Source: CBF
Rules for classification: 1) points; 2) wins; 3) goal difference; 4) goals scored; 5) fewest red cards; 6) fewest yellow cards; 7) draw.

==== Results summary ====
Overall								Home						Away					
Pld	W	D	L	GF	GA	GD	Pts	W	D	L	GF	GA	GD	W	D	L	GF	GA	GD
19	8	5	6	21	26	−5	29	7	2	1	15	9	+6	1	3	5	6	17	−11

==== First stage ====
3 May 2023 1	Paysandu	2–1	Aparecidense	Belém
21:30 (UTC-3)	Vinícius Leite 52'; Mário Sérgio 63'	Report	Calyson 49'	Stadium: Estádio Leônidas Sodré de Castro (Curuzu); Attendance: 4,322; Referee: Adriano Barros Carneiro

8 May 2023 2	Figueirense	2–0	Paysandu	Florianópolis
20:00 (UTC-3)	Bruno Moraes 42'; Guilherme Pato 90+5'	Report		Stadium: Estádio Orlando Scarpelli; Attendance: 7,814; Referee: Emerson Ricardo de Almeida Andrade

11 May 2023 3	Ypiranga	5–0	Paysandu	Erechim
20:00 (UTC-3)	Erick 31', 77'; João Pedro 52'; William Barbio 53', 61'	Report		Stadium: Estádio Olímpico (Colosso da Lagoa); Attendance: 152; Referee: Michelangelo Martins de Almeida Junior

21 May 2023 4	Paysandu	1–0	Manaus	Belém
19:00 (UTC-3)	Mário Sérgio 8'	Report		Stadium: Estádio Leônidas Sodré de Castro (Curuzu); Attendance: 3,232; Referee: Fabio Augusto Santos Sa Junior

28 May 2023 5	Volta Redonda	3–0	Paysandu	Volta Redonda
19:00 (UTC-3)	Ítalo Carvalho 19', 52'; Marcos Vinícius 26'	Report		Stadium: Estádio Municipal General Sylvio (Raulino de Oliveira); Attendance: 547; Referee: Diego Pombo Lopez

4 June 2023 6	Paysandu	1–1	São José	Belém
16:30 (UTC-3)	Nenê Bonilha 45+1'	Report	Thayllon 60'	Stadium: Estádio Leônidas Sodré de Castro (Curuzu); Referee: Ivan da Silva Guimaraes Junior

7 June 2023 7	Operário	0–0	Paysandu	Ponta Grossa
19:00 (UTC-3)		Report		Stadium: Estádio Germano Krüger; Referee: Gustavo Ervino Bauermann

12 June 2023 8	Paysandu	1–1	São Bernardo	Belém
20:00 (UTC-3)	Paulão 20'	Report	Bruno Santos 56'	Stadium: Estádio Leônidas Sodré de Castro (Curuzu); Referee: Tarcizo Pinheiro Caetano

18 June 2023 9	Paysandu	2–1	Floresta	Belém
19:00 (UTC-3)	Mário Sérgio 69', 77'	Report	João Pedro 64'	Stadium: Estádio Leônidas Sodré de Castro (Curuzu); Referee: Paulo Jose Souza Mourão

27 June 2023 10	Botafogo–PB	3–2	Paysandu	João Pessoa
20:00 (UTC-3)	Neto 71'; Pedro Henrique 82'; Rogerinho 90+6'	Report	Bruno Alves 40'; Mário Sérgio 78'	Stadium: Estádio José Américo de Almeida Filho (Almeidão); Referee: Jonathan Antero Silva

1 July 2023 11	Paysandu	0–2	Brusque	Belém
19:00 (UTC-3)		Report	Alex Ruan 55'; Everton Bala 59'	Stadium: Estádio Leônidas Sodré de Castro (Curuzu); Referee: Rodrigo Batista Raposo

8 July 2023 12	Amazonas	1–2	Paysandu	Manaus
16:00 (UTC-4)	Maycon 61'	Report	Nicolas Careca 17'; João Vieira 81'	Stadium: Estádio Municipal Carlos Zamith; Referee: Marcos Mateus de Sousa

17 July 2023 13	Paysandu	1–0	Remo	Belém
20:00 (UTC-3)	Mário Sérgio 34' (pen.)	Report		Stadium: Estádio Estadual Jornalista Edgar Augusto Proença (Mangueirão); Attendance: 27,359; Referee: Vinícius Gonçalves Dias Araujo

23 July 2023 14	Paysandu	1–0	CSA	Belém
19:00 (UTC-3)	Wellington Carvalho 21'	Report		Stadium: Estádio Leônidas Sodré de Castro (Curuzu); Attendance: 7,376; Referee: Jonathan Benkenstein Pinheiro

30 July 2023 15	América–RN	1–1	Paysandu	Natal
16:00 (UTC-3)	Álvaro 45+3'	Report	Mário Sérgio (90+!)	Stadium: Arena das Dunas; Attendance: 15,633; Referee: Marcos Mateus Pereira

6 August 2023 16	Altos	1–1	Paysandu	Teresina
16:00 (UTC-3)	Marcelo 35'	Report	Wanderson 17'	Stadium: Estádio Lindolfo Monteiro; Attendance: 492; Referee: Luiz Paulo de Moura Pinheiro

13 August 2023 17	Paysandu	4–2	Náutico	Belém
16:00 (UTC-3)	Ronaldo Mendes 35'; Kevyn Lucas 63'; Vinícius Leite 78'; Roger 90+4'	Report	Berg 11', 22'	Stadium: Estádio Leônidas Sodré de Castro (Curuzu); Attendance: 15,941; Referee: Felipe Fernandes de Lima

20 August 2023 18	Paysandu	2–1	Pouso Alegre	Belém
19:00 (UTC-3)	Nicolas Careca 13'; Robinho 86' (pen.)	Report	Geovane Meurer 45+3'	Stadium: Estádio Leônidas Sodré de Castro (Curuzu); Attendance: 10,113; Referee: Thayslane de Melo Costa

26 August 2023 19	Confiança	1–0	Paysandu	Aracaju
16:00 (UTC-3)	Ricardo Bueno 15' (pen.)	Report		Stadium: Estádio Lourival Baptista (Batistão); Attendance: 5,462; Referee: Jefferson Ferreira de Morães

==== Second stage ====
3 September 2023 1	Paysandu	1–1	Volta Redonda	Belém
17:00 (UTC-3)	Kevyn Lucas 34'	Report	Ítalo 30' (pen.)	Stadium: Estádio Leônidas Sodré de Castro (Curuzu); Attendance: 7,478; Referee: Gustavo Ervino Bauermann

9 September 2023 2	Amazonas	0–1	Paysandu	Manaus
17:00 (UTC-4)		Report	Mário Sérgio 18' (pen.)	Stadium: Arena da Amazônia; Attendance: 10,026; Referee: Marielson Alves Silva

17 September 2023 3	Paysandu	1–0	Botafogo–PB	Belém
16:00 (UTC-3)	Jacy 90+10'	Report		Stadium: Estádio Estadual Jornalista Edgar Augusto Proença (Mangueirão); Attendance: 49,777; Referee: João Vitor Gobi

23 September 2023 4	Botafogo–PB	2–3	Paysandu	João Pessoa
16:00 (UTC-3)	Pipico 1', 45+7'	Report	Edílson 40'; Vinícius Leite 45+4'; Robinho 56'	Stadium: Estádio José Américo de Almeida Filho (Almeidão); Attendance: 9,661; Referee: Luiz Flavio de Oliveira

1 October 2023 5	Paysandu	1–2	Amazonas	Belém
17:30 (UTC-3)	Mário Sérgio 25'	Report	Igor Bolt 44'; Sassá 57'	Stadium: Estádio Estadual Jornalista Edgar Augusto Proença (Mangueirão); Referee: Rodrigo José Pereira de Lima

7 October 2023 6	Volta Redonda	1–0	Paysandu	Volta Redonda
18:00 (UTC-3)	Bruno 63'	Report		Stadium: Estádio Municipal General Sylvio Raulino de Oliveira; Referee: Wilton Pereira Sampaio

==== Record ====
Final Position	Points	Matches	Wins	Draws	Losses	Goals For	Goals Away	Win%
3rd	39	25	11	6	8	28	32	52%
