= Edílson (footballer, born 1995) =

Brazilian footballer (born 1995)

Personal information
- Full name: Edílson José da Silva Júnior
- Date of birth: 13 April 1995 (age 31)
- Place of birth: Rio de Janeiro, Brazil
- Height: 1.70 m (5 ft 7 in)
- Position: Right-back

Team information
- Current team: Paysandu
- Number: 2

Youth career
- Audax

Senior career*
Years	Team	Apps	(Gls)
2015–2017	Audax Rio	37	(0)
2016	→ Palmas (loan)	5	(0)
2017	→ Tigres do Brasil (loan)	11	(0)
2018	Audax	2	(0)
2018–2022	Brusque	106	(0)
2018	→ Camboriú (loan)	9	(0)
2019	→ Ponte Preta (loan)	8	(0)
2023	Concórdia	7	(0)
2023–	Paysandu	146	(1)
- * Club domestic league appearances and goals as of 9 November 2026

Edílson José da Silva Júnior (born 13 April 1995), known as Edílson Júnior or just Edílson, is a Brazilian footballer who plays as a right-back for Paysandu.

== Career ==
Edílson was born in Rio de Janeiro, and played for Audax as a youth before making his senior debut with Audax Rio in 2015. On 3 June 2016, he was loaned to Palmas for the 2016 Série D.

After a loan to Tigres do Brasil, Edílson returned to his first club Audax for the 2018 season, but moved to Brusque on 20 February of that year. Later in that year, he also played for Camboriú on loan.

On 6 June 2019, after becoming a regular starter for Bruscão, Edílson renewed his contract for three more seasons. On 19 August, however, he was loaned to Série B side Ponte Preta for the remainder of the year.

Back to Brusque in January 2020, Edílson was a regular starter in the club's promotion to the second division, but subsequently lost his starting spot, and left on 15 November 2022. Late in that month, he was announced at Concórdia.

On 13 March 2023, Edílson signed for Paysandu.

== Career statistics ==
As of 7 June 2026.

Club	Season	League			State League		Cup		Continental		Other		Total	
Club	Season	Division	Apps	Goals	Apps	Goals	Apps	Goals	Apps	Goals	Apps	Goals	Apps	Goals
Audax Rio	2015	Carioca Série B	—		13	0	—		—		0	0	13	0
Audax Rio	2016	Carioca Série B	—		8	0	—		—		—		8	0
Audax Rio	2017	Carioca Série B1	—		16	0	—		—		1 (Note: Appearance(s) in Copa Rio)	0	17	0
Audax Rio	Total		—		37	0	—		—		1	0	38	0
Palmas (loan)	2016	Série D	5	0	—		—		—		—		5	0
Tigres do Brasil (loan)	2017	Carioca	—		11	0	—		—		—		11	0
Audax	2018	Paulista A2	—		2	0	—		—		—		2	0
Brusque	2018	Série D	7	0	7	0	0	0	—		12 (Note: Appearance(s) in Copa Santa Catarina)	0	26	0
Brusque	2019	Série D	15	0	16	0	—		—		1 (Note: Appearance(s) in Recopa Catarinense)	0	32	0
Brusque	2020	Série C	19	0	10	0	3	0	—		1	0	33	0
Brusque	2021	Série B	5	0	6	0	0	0	—		—		11	0
Brusque	2022	Série B	11	0	10	0	—		—		—		21	0
Brusque	Total		57	0	49	0	3	0	—		14	0	123	0
Camboriú (loan)	2018	Catarinense Série B	—		9	0	—		—		—		9	0
Ponte Preta (loan)	2019	Série B	8 (Note: Soccerway attribute one appearance to Edson in the match against América Mineiro, but the player who featured in that match was Edílson)	0	—		—		—		—		8	0
Concórdia	2023	Série D	0	0	7	0	—		—		—		7	0
Paysandu	2023	Série C	22	1	8	0	2	0	—		—		32	1
Paysandu	2024	Série B	31	0	14	0	1	0	—		6 (Note: Appearance(s) in Copa Verde)	1	52	1
Paysandu	2025	Série B	27	0	9	0	2	0	—		7 (Note: One appearance in Supercopa Grão-Pará, six appearances and one goal in Copa Verde)	1	45	1
Paysandu	2026	Série C	9	0	10	0	4	0	—		5 (Note: Four appearances in Copa Norte, one appearance in Copa Verde)	0	28	0
Paysandu	Total		89	1	41	0	9	0	—		18	1	157	3
Career total			159	1	156	0	12	0	0	0	33	2	360	3

== Honours ==
Brusque

- Copa Santa Catarina: 2018
- Campeonato Brasileiro Série D: 2019
- Recopa Catarinense: 2020
- Campeonato Catarinense: 2022

Paysandu

- Campeonato Paraense: 2024, 2026
- Copa Verde: 2024, 2025, 2026
- Supercopa Grão-Pará: 2025
- Copa Norte: 2026
