= 2025 Super Copa Grão-Pará =

Paysandu	Tuna Luso
2	0
- Date: 12 January 2025
- Venue: Mangueirão, Belém
- Referee: Gleika Oliveira Pinheiro
- Attendance: 12,896

The 2025 Super Copa Grão-Pará was the 2nd Super Copa Grão-Pará, a football match played between the winners of the previous season's Campeonato Paraense and Copa Grão-Pará competitions. The match was contested between Paysandu and Tuna Luso.

Paysandu defeated Tuna Luso 2–0 for their 1st Super Copa Grão-Pará title.

== Teams ==
Team	Qualification method
Paysandu	2024 Campeonato Paraense champions
Tuna Luso	2024 Copa Grão-Pará champions

== Match ==
12 January 2025
17:00 UTC−3

Paysandu	2–0	Tuna Luso
Nicolas 72', 86'	Report

Mangueirão, Belém
Attendance: 12,896
Referee: Gleika Oliveira Pinheiro

Paysandu	Tuna Luso

Assistant referees:
Nayara Lucena Soares
Luís Diego Nascimento Lopes
Fourth official:
Fernando Antônio Mendes de Salles Nascimento Filho

Match rules

- 90 minutes
- Penalty shoot-out if scores still level
