= 2026 in Brazilian football =

Football in Brazil
- Season: 2026

Men's football
- Série A: Flamengo
- Série B: Novorizontino
- Série C: Maringá
- Série D: Uberlândia
- Supercopa: Corinthians

Women's football
- Série A1: São Paulo
- Série A2: Vasco da Gama
- Série A3: Planalto
- Copa do Brasil Feminina: Internacional
- Supercopa Feminina: Palmeiras

The following article presents a summary of the 2026 football (soccer) season in Brazil, which will be the 125th season of competitive football in the country.

== Campeonato Brasileiro Série A ==
The 2026 Campeonato Brasileiro Série A started on 28 January 2026 and will end on 2 December 2026.

- Athletico Paranaense
- Atlético Mineiro
- Bahia
- Botafogo
- Chapecoense
- Corinthians
- Coritiba
- Cruzeiro
- Flamengo
- Fluminense
- Grêmio
- Internacional
- Mirassol
- Palmeiras
- Red Bull Bragantino
- Remo
- Santos
- São Paulo
- Vasco da Gama
- Vitória

Pos	Team	Pld	W	D	L	GF	GA	GD	Pts	Qualification or relegation
1	Flamengo (C, Q)	36	24	8	4	74	31	+43	80	Qualification for Copa Libertadores group stage
2	Palmeiras (Q)	36	21	11	4	64	26	+38	74	Qualification for Copa Libertadores group stage
3	Cruzeiro (Q)	36	20	6	10	59	50	+9	66	Qualification for Copa Libertadores group stage
4	Fluminense (T)	35	17	9	9	56	42	+14	60	Qualification for Copa Libertadores group stage
5	Athletico Paranaense (X)	36	16	9	11	56	47	+9	57	Qualification for Copa Libertadores second stage (Note: Since Palmeiras, who qualified for the Copa Libertadores group stage on league performance, reached the 2026 Copa do Brasil final, the Copa Libertadores second stage berth allocated to the 2026 Copa do Brasil runners-up was passed to the Série A's highest-placed team not already qualified.)
6	Bahia (X)	36	14	12	10	50	46	+4	54	Qualification for Copa Libertadores second stage
7	Atlético Mineiro (X)	35	14	9	12	44	40	+4	51	Qualification for Copa Sudamericana group stage
8	Santos	35	13	11	11	51	49	+2	50	Qualification for Copa Sudamericana group stage
9	Red Bull Bragantino	35	13	8	14	45	41	+4	47	Qualification for Copa Sudamericana group stage
10	Vasco da Gama	35	13	8	14	47	51	−4	47	Qualification for Copa Sudamericana group stage
11	Coritiba	36	12	9	15	41	52	−11	45	Qualification for Copa Sudamericana group stage
12	São Paulo	35	12	8	15	39	40	−1	44	Qualification for Copa Sudamericana group stage
13	Botafogo	35	11	9	15	46	57	−11	42	
14	Vitória	35	11	8	16	37	52	−15	41	
15	Mirassol	35	10	11	14	39	48	−9	41	
16	Corinthians	35	10	10	15	40	42	−2	40	
17	Internacional	35	9	11	15	39	44	−5	38	Relegation to Campeonato Brasileiro Série B
18	Grêmio (Note: Grêmio qualified for the Copa Libertadores group stage as 2026 Copa do Brasil champions or runners-up. If they are relegated, their berth will be passed to the Série A's highest-placed team not already qualified.)	35	9	11	15	38	47	−9	38	Relegation to Campeonato Brasileiro Série B
19	Remo (R)	36	7	11	18	41	61	−20	32	Relegation to Campeonato Brasileiro Série B
20	Chapecoense (R)	36	4	9	23	34	74	−40	21	Relegation to Campeonato Brasileiro Série B

Updated to match(es) played on 22 November 2026 (1 of 3 matches finished). Source: CBF
Rules for classification: 1) points; 2) wins; 3) goal difference; 4) goals scored; 5) head-to-head results (only between two teams); 6) fewest red cards; 7) fewest yellow cards; 8) drawing of lots.
(C) Champions; (Q) Qualified for the phase indicated; (R) Relegated; (T) Qualified, but not yet for the particular phase indicated; (X) Assured of Copa Sudamericana, but may still qualify for Copa Libertadores
Notes:

Flamengo won the league.

=== Relegation ===
The four worst placed teams, Chapecoense, Remo, TBD and TBD, were relegated to the following year's second level.

== Campeonato Brasileiro Série B ==
The 2026 Campeonato Brasileiro Série B started on 21 March 2026 and will end on 28 November 2026.

- América Mineiro
- Athletic
- Atlético Goianiense
- Avaí
- Botafogo (SP)
- Ceará
- CRB
- Criciúma
- Cuiabá
- Fortaleza
- Goiás
- Juventude
- Londrina
- Náutico
- Novorizontino
- Operário Ferroviário
- Ponte Preta
- São Bernardo
- Sport
- Vila Nova

Pos	Team	Pld	W	D	L	GF	GA	GD	Pts	Promotion or relegation
1	Novorizontino (C, P)	38	21	10	7	67	32	+35	73	Promotion to 2027 Campeonato Brasileiro Série A
2	Juventude (P)	38	20	11	7	51	26	+25	71	Promotion to 2027 Campeonato Brasileiro Série A
3	Vila Nova	38	19	9	10	53	39	+14	66	Advance to the promotion play-offs
4	Fortaleza	38	17	14	7	45	33	+12	65	Advance to the promotion play-offs
5	Criciúma	38	18	8	12	38	32	+6	62	Advance to the promotion play-offs
6	Atlético Goianiense	38	16	13	9	46	35	+11	61	Advance to the promotion play-offs
7	CRB	38	17	8	13	58	52	+6	59	
8	Goiás	38	17	7	14	39	44	−5	58	
9	Sport	38	15	13	10	53	42	+11	58	
10	Operário Ferroviário	38	16	9	13	51	50	+1	57	
11	São Bernardo	38	14	11	13	54	44	+10	53	
12	Botafogo-SP	38	14	9	15	45	41	+4	51	
13	Athletic	38	11	15	12	46	46	0	48	
14	Cuiabá	38	11	14	13	34	33	+1	47	
15	Náutico	38	12	10	16	41	51	−10	46	
16	Ceará	38	11	11	16	39	48	−9	44	
17	Avaí (R)	38	12	7	19	37	47	−10	43	Relegation to 2027 Campeonato Brasileiro Série C
18	Londrina (R)	38	9	8	21	47	59	−12	35	Relegation to 2027 Campeonato Brasileiro Série C
19	América Mineiro (R)	38	8	5	25	27	57	−30	29	Relegation to 2027 Campeonato Brasileiro Série C
20	Ponte Preta (R)	38	3	6	29	21	81	−60	15	Relegation to 2027 Campeonato Brasileiro Série C

Source: CBF
Rules for classification: 1) points; 2) wins; 3) goal difference; 4) goals scored; 5) head-to-head results (only between 2 teams); 6) fewest red cards; 7) fewest yellow cards; 8) drawing of lots.
(C) Champions; (P) Promoted; (R) Relegated

Novorizontino won the league.

=== Promotion play-offs ===
==== Group A ====
22 November 2026

Atlético Goianiense	1–1	Vila Nova

Estádio Antônio Accioly, Goiânia

27 November 2026

Vila Nova	–	Atlético Goianiense

Estádio Onésio Brasileiro Alvarenga, Goiânia

==== Group B ====
22 November 2026

Criciúma	1–0	Fortaleza

Estádio Heriberto Hülse, Criciúma

28 November 2026

Fortaleza	–	Criciúma

Castelão, Fortaleza

=== Promotion ===
The two best placed teams, Novorizontino and Juventude, together with the winners of the promotion play-offs, TBD and TBD, were promoted to the following year's first level.

=== Relegation ===
The four worst placed teams, Ponte Preta, América Mineiro, Londrina and Avaí, were relegated to the following year's third level.

== Campeonato Brasileiro Série C ==
The 2026 Campeonato Brasileiro Série C started on 4 April 2026 and ended on 24 October 2026.

- Amazonas
- Anápolis
- Barra
- Botafogo (PB)
- Brusque
- Caxias
- Confiança
- Ferroviária
- Figueirense
- Floresta
- Guarani
- Inter de Limeira
- Itabaiana
- Ituano
- Maranhão
- Maringá
- Paysandu
- Santa Cruz
- Volta Redonda
- Ypiranga (RS)

The Campeonato Brasileiro Série C final was played between Maringá and Ferroviária.

17 October 2026

Maringá	1–1	Ferroviária

Estádio Willie Davids, Maringá

24 October 2026

Ferroviária	1–2	Maringá

Fonte Luminosa, Araraquara

Maringá won the league after beating Ferroviária.

=== Promotion ===
The four best placed teams, Santa Cruz, Maringá, Ferroviária and Inter de Limeira, were promoted to the following year's second level.

=== Relegation ===
The two worst placed teams, Confiança and Itabaiana, were relegated to the following year's fourth level.

== Campeonato Brasileiro Série D ==
The 2026 Campeonato Brasileiro Série D started on 4 April 2026 and ended on 13 September 2026.

- ABC
- ABECAT
- Água Santa
- Águia de Marabá
- Altos
- América de Natal
- America (RJ)
- Aparecidense
- Araguaína
- ASA
- Atlético Cearense
- Atlético de Alagoinhas
- Azuriz
- Betim
- Blumenau
- Brasil de Pelotas
- Brasiliense
- Capital (DF)
- Ceilândia
- Central
- CEOV
- Cianorte
- CRAC
- CSA
- CSE
- Decisão
- Democrata-GV
- FC Cascavel
- Ferroviário
- Fluminense (PI)
- Galvez
- Gama
- GAS
- Goiatuba
- Guaporé
- Guarany de Bagé
- Humaitá
- IAPE
- Iguatu
- Imperatriz
- Independência
- Inhumas
- Ivinhema
- Jacuipense
- Joinville
- Juazeirense
- Lagarto
- Laguna
- Luverdense
- Madureira
- Maguary
- Manauara
- Manaus
- Maracanã
- Marcílio Dias
- Maricá
- Mixto
- Monte Roraima
- Moto Club
- Nacional
- Noroeste
- Nova Iguaçu
- Operário
- Oratório
- Parnahyba
- Piauí
- Porto (BA)
- Porto Velho
- Portuguesa (RJ)
- Portuguesa (SP)
- Pouso Alegre
- Primavera
- Real Noroeste
- Retrô
- Rio Branco (ES)
- Sampaio Corrêa
- Sampaio Corrêa (RJ)
- Santa Catarina
- São José (RS)
- São Joseense
- São Luiz
- São Raimundo
- Sergipe
- Serra Branca
- Sousa
- Tirol
- Tocantinópolis
- Tombense
- Trem
- Treze
- Tuna Luso
- Uberlândia
- União Rondonópolis
- Velo Clube
- Vitória (ES)
- XV de Piracicaba

The Campeonato Brasileiro Série D final was played between ASA and Uberlândia.

6 September 2026

ASA	0–2	Uberlândia

Estádio Municipal Coaracy da Mata Fonseca, Arapiraca

13 September 2026

Uberlândia	1–1	ASA

Estádio Parque do Sabiá, Uberlândia

Uberlândia won the league after defeating ASA.

=== Promotion ===
The six best placed teams, Uberlândia, Gama, ABC, ASA, Goiatuba and Nacional, were promoted to the following year's third level.

== Super cup ==
=== Supercopa Rei ===
The 2026 Supercopa Rei was played on 1 February 2026 between Flamengo and Corinthians.

1 February 2026

Flamengo	0–2	Corinthians

Arena BRB Mané Garrincha, Brasília

Corinthians won the super cup after defeating Flamengo.

== Domestic cups ==
=== Copa do Brasil ===
The 2026 Copa do Brasil started on 17 February 2026 and will end on 6 December 2026. The Copa do Brasil final will be played between Grêmio and Palmeiras.

6 December 2026

Grêmio	–	Palmeiras

Arena Mané Garrincha, Brasília

=== Copa do Nordeste ===
The competition featured 20 clubs from the Northeastern region. It started on 24 March 2026 and ended on 6 June 2026. The Copa do Nordeste final was played between Fortaleza and Vitória.

2 June 2026

Fortaleza	1–2	Vitória

Castelão, Fortaleza

6 June 2026

Vitória	2–1	Fortaleza

Barradão, Salvador

Vitória won the cup after defeating Fortaleza.

=== Copa Sul-Sudeste ===
The competition featured 12 clubs from the South-Southeastern region. It started on 24 March 2026 and ended on 7 June 2026. The Copa Sul-Sudeste final was played between Chapecoense and Avaí.

3 June 2026

Avaí	3–0	Chapecoense

Estádio da Ressacada, Florianópolis

7 June 2026

Chapecoense	3–0	Avaí
Penalties
	4–5

Arena Condá, Chapecó

Avaí won the cup after defeating Chapecoense.

=== Copa Verde ===
The 2026 Copa Verde was played on 4 and 7 June 2026 between Anápolis and Paysandu.

4 June 2026

Anápolis	3–1	Paysandu

Estádio Jonas Duarte, Anápolis

7 June 2026

Paysandu	4–0	Anápolis

Mangueirão, Belém

Paysandu won the cup after defeating Anápolis.

==== Copa Centro-Oeste ====
The competition featured 12 clubs from the West-central region. It started on 24 March 2026 and ended on 27 May 2026. The Copa Centro-Oeste final was played between Anápolis and Rio Branco.

21 May 2026

Anápolis	3–0	Rio Branco

Estádio Jonas Duarte, Anápolis

27 May 2026

Rio Branco	2–1	Anápolis

Estádio Kleber Andrade, Cariacica

Anápolis won the cup after defeating Rio Branco.

==== Copa Norte ====
The competition featured 12 clubs from the northern region. It started on 24 March 2026 and ended on 28 May 2026. The Copa do Norte final was played between Paysandu and Nacional.

20 May 2026

Paysandu	1–0	Nacional

Mangueirão, Belém

28 May 2026

Nacional	2–4	Paysandu

Estádio Municipal Carlos Zamith, Manaus

Paysandu won the cup after defeating Nacional.

== State championship champions ==
State	Champions
(Acre (state)) Acre	Santa Cruz
Alagoas	CRB
Amapá	Santos
(Amazonas (Brazilian state)) Amazonas	Nacional
Bahia	Bahia
Ceará	Fortaleza
(Federal District (Brazil)) Distrito Federal	Gama
Espírito Santo	Porto Vitória
Goiás	Goiás
Maranhão	IAPE
Mato Grosso	Mixto
Mato Grosso do Sul	Operário
Minas Gerais	Cruzeiro
Pará	Paysandu
Paraíba	Botafogo
(Paraná (state)) Paraná	Operário Ferroviário
Pernambuco	Sport
Piauí	Piauí
(Rio de Janeiro (state)) Rio de Janeiro	Flamengo
Rio Grande do Norte	América de Natal
Rio Grande do Sul	Grêmio
Rondônia	Guaporé
Roraima	GAS
(Santa Catarina (state)) Santa Catarina	Barra
(São Paulo (state)) São Paulo	Palmeiras
Sergipe	Sergipe
Tocantins	Tocantinópolis

== State championship second division champions ==
State	Champions
(Acre (state)) Acre	Atlético Acreano
Alagoas	Sporting
Amapá	Rio Norte
(Amazonas (Brazilian state)) Amazonas	Fast Clube
Bahia	Fluminense de Feira
Ceará	Itapipoca
(Federal District (Brazil)) Distrito Federal	Canaã
Espírito Santo	Estrela do Norte
Goiás	Rio Verde
Maranhão	Araioses
Mato Grosso	Sinop
Mato Grosso do Sul	Aquidauanense
Minas Gerais	Villa Nova
Pará	Urumajó
Paraíba	Cruzeiro
(Paraná (state)) Paraná	Paranavaí
Piauí	River
(Rio de Janeiro (state)) Rio de Janeiro	Americano
Rio Grande do Norte	Palmeira
Rio Grande do Sul	Passo Fundo
Rondônia	Rolim de Moura
(Santa Catarina (state)) Santa Catarina	Hercílio Luz
(São Paulo (state)) São Paulo	Juventus
Sergipe	
Tocantins	Guaraí

== State championship third division champions ==
State	Champions
Ceará	Acopiara
Goiás	Real Clube
Minas Gerais	Paracatu
Pará	Gavião Kyikatejê
(Paraná (state)) Paraná	City London
(Rio de Janeiro (state)) Rio de Janeiro	End: 28 November
Rio Grande do Sul	End: 29 November
(Santa Catarina (state)) Santa Catarina	Inter de Lages
(São Paulo (state)) São Paulo	Portuguesa Santista
Sergipe	

== State championship fourth division champions ==
State	Champions
(Rio de Janeiro (state)) Rio de Janeiro	End: 29 November
(São Paulo (state)) São Paulo	Penapolense

== State championship fifth division champions ==
State	Champions
(Rio de Janeiro (state)) Rio de Janeiro	Cardoso Moreira
(São Paulo (state)) São Paulo	Independente de Limeira

== State cup competition champions ==
Competition	Champions
Copa Alagoas	CSA
Copa ES	Rio Branco de Venda Nova
Copa Fares Lopes	End: 29 November
Copa FGF	Gramadense
Copa FMF	Cuiabá
Copa Governo do Estado (SE)	Desportiva Aracaju
Copa Grão-Pará	Capitão Poço
Copa MS	End: 7 December
Copa Paraíba	End: December
Copa Paraná	Athletico Paranaense
Copa Paulista	São José
Copa Rio	Boavista
Copa Santa Catarina	End: 29 November

== Youth competition champions ==
Competition	Champions
Campeonato Brasileiro Sub-20	Vasco da Gama
Campeonato Brasileiro Sub-20 Série B	Goiás
Copa do Brasil Sub-20	
Campeonato Brasileiro Sub-17	Corinthians
Copa do Brasil Sub-17	Athletico Paranaense
Copa São Paulo de Futebol Júnior	Cruzeiro
Copa 2 de Julho Sub-15	Santos

== Brazilian clubs in international competitions ==
Team	2026 Copa Libertadores	2026 Copa Sudamericana	2026 Recopa Sudamericana
Atlético Mineiro	N/A	Runners-up lost to (Argentina) Boca Juniors	N/A
Bahia	Second stage eliminated by (Chile) O'Higgins	N/A	N/A
Botafogo	Third stage eliminated by (Ecuador) Barcelona	Round of 16 eliminated by (Peru) Cienciano	N/A
Corinthians	Quarter-finals eliminated by (Argentina) Estudiantes	N/A	N/A
Cruzeiro	Round of 16 eliminated by (Brazil) Flamengo	N/A	N/A
Flamengo	Semi-finals eliminated by (Argentina) Estudiantes	N/A	Runners-up lost to (Argentina) Lanús
Fluminense	Semi-finals eliminated by (Brazil) Palmeiras	N/A	N/A
Grêmio	N/A	Knockout round play-offs eliminated by (Bolivia) Bolívar	N/A
Mirassol	Round of 16 eliminated by (Ecuador) LDU Quito	N/A	N/A
Palmeiras	In the Final	N/A	N/A
Red Bull Bragantino	N/A	Round of 16 eliminated by (Brazil) Atlético Mineiro	N/A
Santos	N/A	Quarter-finals eliminated by (Brazil) Atlético Mineiro	N/A
São Paulo	N/A	Quarter-finals eliminated by (Argentina) Boca Juniors	N/A
Vasco da Gama	N/A	Semi-finals eliminated by (Argentina) Boca Juniors	N/A

== National team ==
The following table lists all the games played by the Brazilian national team in official competitions and friendly matches during 2026.

=== Friendlies ===
26 March	Brazil	1–2	France	Foxborough, United States
16:00 UTC−4	Bremer 78'	Report	Mbappé 31'; Ekitiké 64'	Stadium: Gillette Stadium; Referee: Guido Gonzales Jr (United States)

31 March	Brazil	3–1	Croatia	Orlando, United States
20:00 UTC−4	Danilo Santos 45+1'; Igor Thiago 87' (pen.); Gabriel Martinelli 90+1'	Report	Majer 83'	Stadium: Camping World Stadium; Referee: Armando Villarreal (United States)

31 May	Brazil	6–2	Panama	Rio de Janeiro, Brazil
18:30 UTC−3	Vinícius Júnior 1'; Casemiro 38'; Rayan 52'; Lucas Paquetá 59'; Igor Thiago 62' (pen.); Danilo Santos 80'	Report	A. Murillo 13'; Harvey 83'	Stadium: Maracanã; Referee: Daniel Schlager (Germany)

6 June	Brazil	2–1	Egypt	Cleveland, United States
18:00 UTC−4	Bruno Guimarães 6'; Endrick 51'	Report	Zico 10'	Stadium: Huntington Bank Field; Referee: Adonai Escobedo (Mexico)

25 September	Australia	1–1	Brazil	Townsville, Australia
20:00 UTC+10	Irankunda 68'	Report	Rayan 90+4'	Stadium: Queensland Country Bank Stadium; Referee: Ryō Tanimoto (Japan)

29 September	Australia	2–4	Brazil	Brisbane, Australia
20:00 UTC+10	Circati 30'; Metcalfe 34'	Report	Vanderson 3'; Raphinha 45+1' (pen.); Bruno Guimarães 70'; Vinícius Júnior 80' (pen.)	Stadium: Suncorp Stadium; Attendance: 52,423; Referee: Yusuke Araki (Japan)

3 October	India	0–4	Brazil	Kolkata, India
19:30 UTC+5:30		Report	Estêvão 28'; Pedro 42'; Samuel Lino 58', 90+4'	Stadium: Salt Lake Stadium; Referee: Ilgiz Tantashev (Uzbekistan)

14 November	Japan	3–2	Brazil	Kallang, Singapore
18:15 UTC+8	Kubo 14'; Nakamura 18'; Sakamoto 90'	Report	Vinícius Júnior 32', 74'	Stadium: Singapore National Stadium; Attendance: 38,688; Referee: Jansen Foo Chuan Hui (Singapore)

17 November	Singapore	0–7	Brazil	Kallang, Singapore
18:00 UTC+8		Report	Vinícius Júnior 9', 15', 21'; Endrick 31'; Estêvão 51'; Rayan 65'; Suhaimi 74' (o.g.)	Stadium: Singapore National Stadium; Attendance: 19,826; Referee: Alireza Faghani (Australia)

=== 2026 FIFA World Cup ===
13 June Group C	Brazil	1–1	Morocco	East Rutherford, United States
18:00 UTC−4	Vinícius Júnior 32'	Report	Saibari 21'	Stadium: MetLife Stadium; Attendance: 80,663; Referee: Slavko Vinčić (Slovenia)

19 June Group C	Brazil	3–0	Haiti	Philadelphia, United States
20:30 UTC−4	Matheus Cunha 23', 36'; Vinícius Júnior 45+3'	Report		Stadium: Lincoln Financial Field; Attendance: 68,324; Referee: Alejandro Hernández Hernández (Spain)

24 June Group C	Scotland	0–3	Brazil	Miami Gardens, United States
18:00 UTC−4		Report	Vinícius Júnior 7', 45+3'; Matheus Cunha 60'	Stadium: Hard Rock Stadium; Attendance: 64,478; Referee: César Arturo Ramos (Mexico)

29 June Round of 32	Brazil	2–1	Japan	Houston, United States
12:00 UTC−5	Casemiro 56'; Gabriel Martinelli 90+5'	Report	Sano 29'	Stadium: NRG Stadium; Attendance: 68,777; Referee: Maurizio Mariani (Italy)

5 July Round of 16	Brazil	1–2	Norway	East Rutherford, United States
16:00 UTC−4	Neymar 90+10' (pen.)	Report	Haaland 79', 90'	Stadium: MetLife Stadium; Attendance: 80,663; Referee: Ismail Elfath (United States)

Competition	Performance
FIFA World Cup	Round of 16 eliminated by Norway

== Women's football ==
=== Campeonato Brasileiro de Futebol Feminino Série A1 ===
The 2026 Campeonato Brasileiro de Futebol Feminino Série A1 started on 12 February 2026 and ended on 3 October 2026.

- América Mineiro
- Atlético Mineiro
- Bahia
- Botafogo
- Corinthians
- Cruzeiro
- Ferroviária
- Flamengo
- Fluminense
- Grêmio
- Internacional
- Juventude
- Mixto
- Palmeiras
- Red Bull Bragantino
- Santos
- São Paulo
- Vitória

Real Brasília declined to participate in the Série A1. They were replaced by Vitória
Fortaleza women's section was closed. They were replaced by Mixto

The Campeonato Brasileiro de Futebol Feminino Série A1 final was played between São Paulo and Corinthians.

26 September 2026

Corinthians	1–2	São Paulo

Neo Química Arena, São Paulo

3 October 2026

São Paulo	1–1	Corinthians

MorumBIS, São Paulo

São Paulo won the league after defeating Corinthians.

==== Relegation ====
The two worst placed teams, Botafogo and Vitória, were relegated to the following year's second level.

=== Campeonato Brasileiro de Futebol Feminino Série A2 ===
The 2026 Campeonato Brasileiro de Futebol Feminino Série A2 started on 14 March 2026 and ended on 20 September 2026.

- 3B da Amazônia
- Ação
- Atlético Piauiense
- Ceará
- Doce Mel/Jequié EC
- Itabirito
- Itacoatiara
- Minas Brasília
- Paysandu
- Pérolas Negras
- Rio Negro
- Sport
- AD Taubaté
- UDA
- Vasco da Gama
- Vila Nova/UNIVERSO

Avaí declined to participate in the Série A2. They were replaced by Ceará

The Campeonato Brasileiro de Futebol Feminino Série A2 final was played between Itabirito and Vasco da Gama.

13 September 2026

Itabirito	1–3	Vasco da Gama

Arena do Jacaré, Sete Lagoas

20 September 2026

Vasco da Gama	1–2	Itabirito

São Januário, Rio de Janeiro

Vasco da Gama won the league after defeating Itabirito.

==== Promotion ====
The four best placed teams, Minas Brasília, Vasco da Gama, Itabirito and Atlético Piauiense, were promoted to the following year's first level.

==== Relegation ====
The two worst placed teams, Itacoatiara and UDA, were relegated to the following year's third level.

=== Campeonato Brasileiro de Futebol Feminino Série A3 ===
The 2026 Campeonato Brasileiro de Futebol Feminino Série A3 started on 20 March 2026 and ended on 5 September 2026.

- Araguari
- Atlético de Alagoinhas
- Brasil de Farroupilha
- Coritiba
- CRESSPOM
- Criciúma
- Galvez
- Guarani de Paripueira
- Ipojuca
- Itapuense
- Juventude (SE)
- Liga São João/Piripiri
- Mauaense
- Mixto (PB)
- Pantanal
- Paraíso
- Penarol
- Planalto
- Portuguesa (AP)
- Prosperidade
- R4
- Real HEIPS
- Realidade Jovem
- Remo
- Rolim de Moura
- Sampaio Corrêa
- São José (SP)
- São Raimundo
- Tiradentes (PA)
- União (RN)
- Várzea Grande
- Ypiranga (AP)

Valadares declined to participate in the Série A3. They were replaced by Araguari
Pérolas Negras, UDA, and Ceará were promoted to the 2026 Série A2 due to other teams' withdrawals from the upper divisions. The spots they vacated were given to the three highest-ranking teams in the 2025 Série A3 that did not qualify for the 2026 edition. These teams were Operário, Ypiranga (AP), and Rolim de Moura. However, Operário declined to participate, so Mauaense, the highest-ranking team from São Paulo that did not qualify, took their place.

The Campeonato Brasileiro de Futebol Feminino Série A3 final was played between Juventude (SE) and Planalto.

30 August 2026

Planalto	1–0	Juventude (SE)

Estádio Annibal Batista de Toledo, Aparecida de Goiânia

5 September 2026

Juventude (SE)	0–1	Planalto

Batistão, Aracaju

Planalto won the league after defeating Juventude (SE).

==== Promotion ====
The four best placed teams, Realidade Jovem, Juventude (SE), Portuguesa (AP) and Planalto, were promoted to the following year's second level.

=== Super cup ===
==== Supercopa do Brasil de Futebol Feminino ====
The 2026 Supercopa do Brasil de Futebol Feminino was played on 7 February 2026 between Corinthians and Palmeiras.

7 February 2026

Palmeiras	1–1	Corinthians
Penalties
	5–4

Arena Crefisa Barueri, Barueri

Palmeiras won the super cup after defeating Corinthians.

=== Domestic cups ===
==== Copa do Brasil de Futebol Feminino ====
The 2026 Copa do Brasil de Futebol Feminino started on 22 April 2026 and ended on 15 November 2026. The Copa do Brasil de Futebol Feminino final was played between Flamengo and Internacional.

11 November 2026

Flamengo	1–3	Internacional

Estádio Luso Brasileiro, Rio de Janeiro

15 November 2026

Internacional	1–0	Flamengo

Estádio Beira-Rio, Porto Alegre

Internacional won the cup after defeating Flamengo.

=== Domestic competition champions ===
State	Champions
(Acre (state)) Acre	End: 30 November
Alagoas	End: 28 November
Amapá	Portuguesa
(Amazonas (Brazilian state)) Amazonas	3B da Amazônia
Bahia	Vitória
Ceará	Maracanã
(Federal District (Brazil)) Distrito Federal	Minas Brasília
Espírito Santo	Prosperidade
Goiás	Planalto
Maranhão	Luminense
Mato Grosso	CEOV
Mato Grosso do Sul	Pantanal
Minas Gerais	Cruzeiro
Pará	
Paraíba	Mixto
(Paraná (state)) Paraná	Coritiba
Pernambuco	End: 1 December
Piauí	Atlético Piauiense
(Rio de Janeiro (state)) Rio de Janeiro	
Rio Grande do Norte	
Rio Grande do Sul	End: 13 December
Rondônia	
Roraima	
(Santa Catarina (state)) Santa Catarina	
(São Paulo (state)) São Paulo	End: 20 December
Sergipe	
Tocantins	Tocantinópolis

=== State cup competition champions ===
Competition	Champions
Copa Pará de Futebol Feminino	Paysandu
Copa Paulista de Futebol Feminino	End: 5 December
Copa Rio de Futebol Feminino	Fluminense

=== Youth competition champions ===
Competition	Champions
Campeonato Brasileiro de Futebol Feminino Sub-20	Flamengo
Campeonato Brasileiro de Futebol Feminino Sub-17	Ferroviária
Copa São Paulo de Futebol Feminino	End: 12 December

=== Brazilian clubs in international competitions ===
Team	2026 Copa Libertadores Femenina	2026 FIFA Women's Champions Cup
Corinthians	Runners-up lost to (Brazil) Cruzeiro	Runners-up lost to (England) Arsenal
Cruzeiro	Champions defeated (Brazil) Corinthians	N/A
Palmeiras	Quarter-finals eliminated by (Colombia) Santa Fe	N/A

=== National team ===
The following table lists all the games played by the Brazil women's national football team in official competitions and friendly matches during 2026.

The Brazil women's national football team competed in the following competitions in 2026:

==== Friendlies ====
27 February	Costa Rica	2–5	Brazil	Alajuela, Costa Rica
19:00 (CST)	Chinchilla 51', 66'	Report	Kerolin 10'; Jheniffer 14', 90+1'; Tainá Maranhão 27'; Adriana 79' (pen.)	Stadium: Estadio Alejandro Morera Soto; Referee: Félix Mojica (Nicaragua)

4 March	Brazil	1–2	Venezuela	Toluca, Mexico
15:30 (CST)	Jaqueline 83'	Report	Romero 44'; Higuera 48'	Stadium: Estadio FMF - Campus Toluca; Referee: Francia González (Mexico)

7 March	Mexico	1–0	Brazil	Mexico City, Mexico
17:00 (CST)	Espinoza 75'	Report		Stadium: Estadio Ciudad de los Deportes; Attendance: 24,876; Referee: Carly Shaw-MacLaren (Canada)

6 June	Brazil	2–1	United States	São Paulo, Brazil
18:30 (BRT)	Tainá Maranhão 10'; Bia Zaneratto 13'	Report	Wilson 1'	Stadium: Neo Química Arena; Attendance: 31,376; Referee: María Eugenia Gil Soriano (Spain)

9 June	Brazil	0–1	United States	Fortaleza, Brazil
21:30 (BRT)		Report	Belinha 62' (o.g.)	Stadium: Castelão; Attendance: 55,744; Referee: Paola Cebollada López (Spain)

10 October	Brazil	3–1	Argentina	Porto Alegre, Brazil
16:30 (BRT)	Luany 26'; Geyse 38'; Angelina 45'	Report	Pereyra 50'	Stadium: Estádio Beira-Rio; Attendance: 28,386; Referee: Erika González Nevárez (Mexico)

13 October	Brazil	2–2	Argentina	São Lourenço da Mata, Brazil
20:30 (BRT)	Bia Zaneratto 12'; Gio Garbelini 27'	Report	Falfán 34'; Bonsegundo 54' (pen.)	Stadium: Arena Pernambuco; Attendance: 29,444; Referee: Lizzet García (Mexico)

29 November	Japan	–	Brazil	Hiroshima, Japan
				Stadium: Edion Peace Wing Hiroshima

5 December	Japan	–	Brazil	Okayama, Japan
				Stadium: JFE Harenokuni Stadium

==== 2026 Women's FIFA Series (Brazil) ====
11 April	Brazil	5–1	South Korea	Cuiabá, Brazil
21:30 (AMT)	Ary Borges 42'; Ludmila 47'; Dudinha 58'; Kerolin 61'; Tainá Maranhão 83'	Report	Park Soo-jeong 87'	Stadium: Arena Pantanal; Referee: Laura Fortunato (Argentina)

14 April	Brazil	6–1	Zambia	Cuiabá, Brazil
21:30 (AMT)	Yasmim 30'; Tainá Maranhão 47'; Angelina 60' (pen.); Raíssa Bahia 77'; Kerolin 90+1'; Vitória Calhau 90+6' (pen.)	Report	B. Banda 51'	Stadium: Arena Pantanal; Referee: Emikar Calderas (Venezuela)

18 April	Brazil	1–0	Canada	Cuiabá, Brazil
21:30 (AMT)	Aline Gomes 47'	Report		Stadium: Arena Pantanal; Referee: María Victoria Daza (Colombia)

Competition	Performance
Women's FIFA Series (Brazil)	Champions
