= 2025 Paysandu Sport Club season =

Paysandu Sport Club
2025 season
- Manager: Márcio Fernandes
- Série B: Pre-season
- Campeonato Paraense: Finals
- Copa do Brasil: Pre-season
- Supercopa Grão-Pará: Winners
- Copa Verde: Winners
- Top goalscorer: League: All: Nicolas (4)
- Average home league attendance: 13,494
- All statistics correct as of 12 January 2025.

The 2025 season is the 111th competitive campaign for Paysandu Sport Club. The team will take part in the Campeonato Brasileiro Série B for the second consecutive season, the Campeonato Paraense, and the Copa do Brasil.

== Squad ==
=== Transfers Out ===
Pos.	Player	Transferred to	Fee	Date	Source
MF	(Venezuela) Esli García	(Brazil) Goiás	Undisclosed	1 January 2025	
MF	(Brazil) Matheus Trindade	(Brazil) Criciúma	Free	3 January 2025	

== Competitions ==
=== Overall record ===
Competition	First match	Last match	Starting round	Final position	Record							
Competition	First match	Last match	Starting round	Final position	Pld	W	D	L	GF	GA	GD	Win %
Série B	5 April 2025	22 November 2025	Matchday 1	20th	38	5	13	20	36	52	−16	13.16
Campeonato Paraense	19 January 2025	14 May 2025	Final	Runner-up	12	8	2	2	23	11	+12	66.67
Copa do Brasil	30 April 2025		Third round	Third Round	2	0	0	2	0	5	−5	0.00
Supercopa Grão-Pará	12 January 2025		Final	Winners	1	1	0	0	2	0	+2	100.00
Copa Verde	5 February 2025	23 April 2025	Final	Winners	7	2	5	0	11	5	+6	28.57
Total					60	16	20	24	72	73	−1	26.67

Last updated: 19 January 2025
Source: Competitions

=== Série B ===
==== League table ====
Pos	Team	Pld	W	D	L	GF	GA	GD	Pts	Promotion or relegation
16	Botafogo-SP	38	10	12	16	32	52	−20	42	
17	Ferroviária (R)	38	8	16	14	43	52	−9	40	Relegation to 2026 Campeonato Brasileiro Série C
18	Amazonas (R)	38	8	12	18	38	55	−17	36	Relegation to 2026 Campeonato Brasileiro Série C
19	Volta Redonda (R)	38	8	12	18	26	43	−17	36	Relegation to 2026 Campeonato Brasileiro Série C
20	Paysandu (R)	38	5	13	20	36	52	−16	28	Relegation to 2026 Campeonato Brasileiro Série C

Source: CBF
Rules for classification: 1) points; 2) wins; 3) goal difference; 4) goals scored; 5) head-to-head results (only between 2 teams); 6) fewest red cards; 7) fewest yellow cards; 8) drawing of lots.
(R) Relegated

==== Matches ====
4 April 2025 1	Paysandu Sport Club	1–2	Athletico Paranaense	Belém
21:00	Villela 43'		Zapelli 33'; Renan 72'	Stadium: Estádio da Curuzu

12 April 2025 2	Vila Nova	1–0	Paysandu	Goiânia
18:00	Poveda 12'			Stadium: Estádio Onésio Brasileiro Alvarenga

16 April 2025 3	Paysandu	0-2	Chapecoense	Belém
20:00			Maílton 26'; Paulo 35'	Stadium: Mangueirão; Referee: Wagner do Nascimento Magalhaes

19 April 2025 4	Operário Ferroviário	0–0	Paysandu	Ponta Grossa
16:00				Stadium: Estádio Germano Krüger

28 July 2025 19	Paysandu	1–1	Athletic Club

3 August 2025 20	Athletico Paranaense	1–1	Paysandu

11 August 2025 21	Paysandu	0–1	Vila Nova

17 August 2025 22	Chapecoense	2–0	Paysandu

=== Campeonato Paraense ===
Pos	Team	Pld	W	D	L	GF	GA	GD	Pts	Qualification or relegation
1	Remo	8	5	2	1	17	4	+13	17	Advance to the Final stage
2	Paysandu	8	5	2	1	15	7	+8	17	Advance to the Final stage
3	Bragantino	8	5	2	1	11	6	+5	17	Advance to the Final stage
4	Castanhal	8	3	4	1	10	7	+3	13	Advance to the Final stage
5	Tuna Luso	8	3	2	3	12	12	0	11	Advance to the Final stage

Source: Globo Esporte

19 January 2025 1	Paysandu	4–1	Capitão Poço
16:00 UTC−3

==== Finals ====
7 May 2025 First leg	Paysandu	2–3	Remo	Belém
20:00 UTC−3				Stadium: Mangueirão

11 May 2025 Second leg	Remo	0–1	Paysandu	Belém
17:00 UTC−3				Stadium: Mangueirão

=== Copa do Brasil ===
==== Third Round ====
30 April 2025 First leg	Paysandu	0–1	Bahia	Belém
21:30 UTC−3		Report	Cauly 42' (pen.)	Stadium: Mangueirão; Referee: Bruno Arleu de Araujo

21 May 2025 Second leg	Bahia	v	Paysandu	Salvador
21:30 UTC−3		Report		Stadium: Arena Fonte Nova

=== Supercopa Grão-Pará ===
12 January 2025 Final	Paysandu	2–0	Tuna Luso	Belém
17:00 UTC−3	Nicolas 72', 85'			Stadium: Mangueirão; Referee: Gleika Oliveira Pinheiro

=== Copa Verde ===
==== Finals ====
9 April 2025	Paysandu	0–0	Goiás	Belém
20:00 BRT (UTC−3)				Stadium: Mangueirão

23 April 2025	Goiás	1–1	Paysandu	Goiânia
19:30 BRT (UTC−3)				Stadium: Estádio Serra Dourada
