= 2025 Copa Grão-Pará =

Brazilian association football competition

Tournament details
- Dates: 2 – 12 April
- Teams: 6

Final positions
- Champions: Águia de Marabá (1st title)
- Copa do Brasil: Águia de Marabá

Tournament statistics
- Matches played: 5
- Goals scored: 18 (3.6 per match)

The 2025 Copa Grão-Pará was the 2nd Copa Grão-Pará, a football state cup. Those eliminated in the quarter-finals and semi-finals of the Campeonato Paraense will take part.

Águia de Marabá defeated Tuna Luso 9–8 on penalties, after the match finished in a 1–1 draw, to win their first title and a place in the 2026 Copa do Brasil.

== Teams ==
| Team (Berth) | Entry stage | Qualification method |
|---|---|---|
| Bragantino | First round | Eliminated in the quarter-finals of the Campeonato Paraense |
| Capitão Poço | First round | Eliminated in the quarter-finals of the Campeonato Paraense |
| Castanhal | First round | Eliminated in the quarter-finals of the Campeonato Paraense |
| Santa Rosa | First round | Eliminated in the quarter-finals of the Campeonato Paraense |
| Águia de Marabá | Second round | Eliminated in the semi-finals of the Campeonato Paraense |
| Tuna Luso | Second round | Eliminated in the semi-finals of the Campeonato Paraense |

== First round ==
| Team 1 | Score | Team 2 |
|---|---|---|
| Castanhal | 3–1 | Capitão Poço |
| Bragantino | 4–1 | Santa Rosa |

== Second round ==
| Team 1 | Score | Team 2 |
|---|---|---|
| Tuna Luso | 2–1 | Castanhal |
| Águia de Marabá | 2–2 (4–2 p) | Bragantino |

== Final ==
12 April 2025
16:00 UTC –3

| Tuna Luso | 1–1 | Águia de Marabá |
|---|---|---|
| Edgo 90+6' | Report | Romarinho 80' |
Penalties
| | 8–9 |

Mangueirão, Belém
Attendance: 563
Referee: Marco José Soares de Almeida
