= 2026 Copa Grão-Pará =

Brazilian association football competition

Tournament details
- Dates: 22 February – 7 March
- Teams: 6

Final positions
- Champions: Capitão Poço (1st title)
- Copa do Brasil: Capitão Poço

Tournament statistics
- Matches played: 5
- Goals scored: 7 (1.4 per match)

The 2026 Copa Grão-Pará was the 3rd Copa Grão-Pará, a football state cup. Those eliminated in the quarter-finals and semi-finals of the Campeonato Paraense taook part.

Capitão Poço defeated Castanhal 1–0 to win their first title and a place in the 2027 Copa do Brasil.

== Teams ==
Team (Berth)	Entry stage	Qualification method
Águia de Marabá	First round	Eliminated in the quarterfinals of the Campeonato Paraense
Capitão Poço	First round	Eliminated in the quarterfinals of the Campeonato Paraense
Santa Rosa	First round	Eliminated in the quarterfinals of the Campeonato Paraense
Tuna Luso	First round	Eliminated in the quarterfinals of the Campeonato Paraense
Cametá	Second round	Eliminated in the semi-finals of the Campeonato Paraense
Castanhal	Second round	Eliminated in the semi-finals of the Campeonato Paraense

== First round ==
Team 1	Score	Team 2
Águia de Marabá	1–0	Santa Rosa
Capitão Poço	2–1	Tuna Luso

== Second round ==
Team 1	Score	Team 2
Cametá	1–1 (1–2 p)	Capitão Poço
Castanhal	0–0 (4–1 p)	Águia de Marabá

== Final ==
7 March 2026
19:00 UTC –3

Castanhal	0–1	Capitão Poço
	Report	Paulão 60'

Estádio Maximino Porpino Filho, Castanhal
Attendance: 6,093
Referee: Gleika Oliveira Pinheiro
