= Naylhor =

Brazilian footballer

Personal information
- Full name: Naylhor Bispo de Souza Junior
- Date of birth: 24 June 1987 (age 39)
- Place of birth: Montalvânia, Brazil
- Height: 1.89 m (6 ft 2 1/2 in)
- Position: Centre-back

Team information
- Current team: Paysandu

Senior career*
Years	Team	Apps	(Gls)
2007–2013	Nova Iguaçu	0	(0)
2007	→ Mesquita (loan)	0	(0)
2012–2013	→ Icasa (loan)	46	(3)
2014	Paraná	0	(0)
2014	Icasa	30	(2)
2015–2017	Ituano	9	(1)
2017	Figueirense	11	(1)
2018	Botafogo-SP	13	(0)
2018	Vila Nova	10	(0)
2019	Botafogo-SP	15	(2)
2020	Água Santa	0	(0)
2020	Brasiliense	0	(0)
2021	America-RJ	4	(1)
2022	Linense	3	(0)
2022	Tuna Luso	8	(1)
2022–	Paysandu	9	(0)
- * Club domestic league appearances and goals as of 21:45, 22 January 2023 (UTC)

Naylhor Bispo de Souza Junior (born 24 June 1987), simply known as Naylhor, is a Brazilian footballer who plays for Paysandu as a centre-back.

== Honours ==
Paysandu

- Campeonato Paraense: 2024

== Career statistics ==
As of 6 February 2017

Club	Season	League			State League		Cup		Continental		Other		Total	
Club	Season	Division	Apps	Goals	Apps	Goals	Apps	Goals	Apps	Goals	Apps	Goals	Apps	Goals
Nova Iguaçu	2011	Carioca	—		7	0	—		—		4 (Note: All appearance(s) in Copa Rio)	0	11	0
Nova Iguaçu	2012	Carioca	—		15	0	—		—		—		15	0
Nova Iguaçu	Subtotal		—		22	0	—		—		4	0	26	0
Icasa	2012	Série C	21	3	—		—		—		—		21	3
Nova Iguaçu	2013	Carioca	—		1	0	—		—		—		1	0
Icasa	2013	Série B	25	0	12	0	—		—		—		37	0
Paraná	2014	Série B	—		9	0	1	0	—		—		10	0
Icasa	2014	Série B	30	2	—		—		—		—		30	2
Ituano	2015	Paulista	—		12	1	8	0	—		13 (Note: All appearance(s) in Copa Paulista)	2	33	3
Ituano	2016	Série D	9	1	15	3	—		—		—		24	4
Ituano	2017	Paulista	—		1	0	—		—		—		1	0
Ituano	Subtotal		9	1	28	4	8	0	—		13	2	58	7
Career total			85	6	72	4	9	0	0	0	17	2	183	12
