= 2026 Campeonato Paraense =

Campeonato Paraense
- Season: 2026
- Dates: 24 January – 8 March
- Champions: Paysandu (51st title)
- Relegated: Bragantino; São Francisco
- Série D: Cametá; Castanhal
- Copa do Brasil: Paysandu (as Copa Norte winners); Remo; Cametá; Castanhal
- Copa Norte: Paysandu; Remo
- Matches: 44
- Goals: 94 (2.14 per match)
- Top goalscorer: Ítalo (6 goals)
- Biggest home win: Paysandu 5–1 Tuna Luso (19 February 2026)
- Biggest away win: Amazônia 0–3 Capitão Poço (9 February 2026)
- Highest scoring: Paysandu 5–1 Tuna Luso (19 February 2026)
- Highest attendance: 46,809; Paysandu 0–0 Remo (8 March 2026)
- Lowest attendance: 220; Santa Rosa 1–0 São Francisco (4 February 2026)

The 2026 Campeonato Paraense was the 114th edition of Pará's top professional football league. The competition started on 24 January and ended on 8 March. Paysandu won the championship for the 51st time.

== Format ==
Two groups with six clubs, with the teams of one group facing those of the other two. The eight best teams in the overall standings advance to the final stage. The matches of the quarter-finals and semi-finals will be played on a single-legged ties. The finals will be played on a home-and-away two-legged basis.

The two worst teams in the overall standings will be relegated to the 2027 Campeonato Paraense Second Division. The four teams eliminated in the quarter-finals and the two teams eliminated in the semi-finals will be transferred to the Copa Grão-Pará.

The champion, the runner-up and the 3rd-placed team qualify to the 2027 Copa do Brasil. The champion and the runner-up qualify to the 2027 Copa Norte. The best two teams who are not in the Campeonato Brasileiro Série A, Série B or Série C qualify to participate in the 2027 Campeonato Brasileiro Série D.

== Participating teams ==
Locations of the 2026 Campeonato Paraense teams
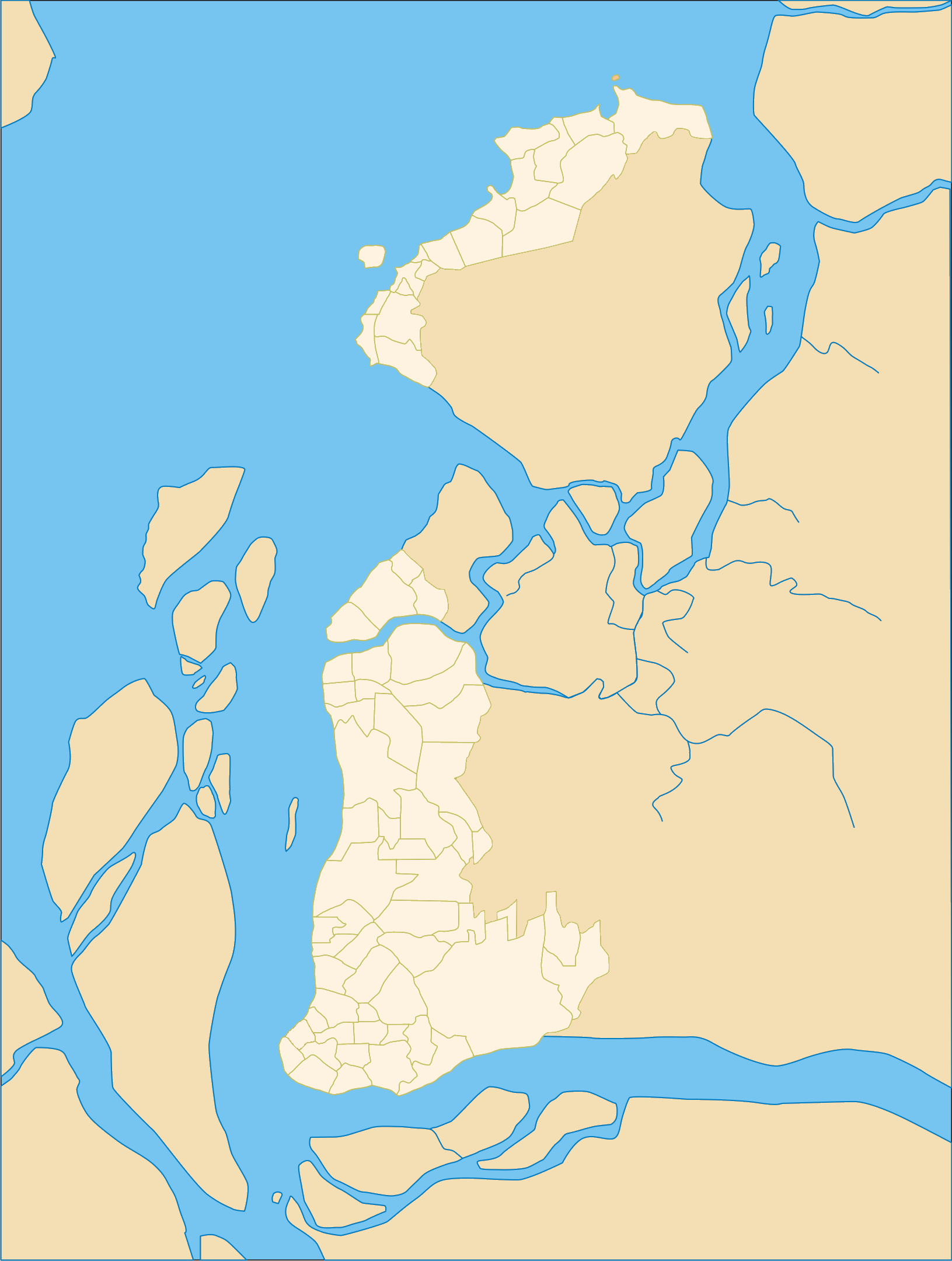
Locations of the 2026 Campeonato Paraense teams – Belém

Club	Home city	Head coach	2025 result
Águia de Marabá	Marabá	Júlio César Nunes	4th
Amazônia Independente	Santarém	Walter Lima	2nd (2nd Division)
Bragantino	Bragança	Mathaus Sodré	5th
Cametá	Cametá	Rogerinho Gameleira	9th
Capitão Poço	Capitão Poço	Aldenir Risada	7th
Castanhal	Castanhal	Guilherme Furtado	6th
Paysandu	Belém	Júnior Rocha	2nd
Remo	Belém	Flávio Garcia (caretaker)	1st
Santa Rosa	Belém	Samuel Cândido	8th
São Francisco	Santarém	Emerson Almeida	10th
São Raimundo	Santarém	Robson Melo	1st (2nd Division)
Tuna Luso	Belém	Robson Melo	3rd

=== Managerial changes ===
Team	Outgoing manager	Date of vacancy	Incoming manager	Date of appointment
Tuna Luso	Alexandre Lopes	14 February 2026	Robson Melo	16 February 2026
Remo	Juan Carlos Osorio	1 March 2026	Flávio Garcia (caretaker)	6 March 2026

== League phase ==
Pos	Team	Pld	W	D	L	GF	GA	GD	Pts	Qualification or relegation
1	Cametá (A)	6	3	2	1	8	4	+4	11	Advance to the Final stage
2	Capitão Poço (A)	6	3	1	2	9	6	+3	10	Advance to the Final stage
3	Paysandu (A)	6	3	1	2	6	4	+2	10	Advance to the Final stage
4	Águia de Marabá (A)	6	3	1	2	8	7	+1	10	Advance to the Final stage
5	Remo (A)	6	2	4	0	9	5	+4	10	Advance to the Final stage
6	Tuna Luso (A)	6	3	0	3	3	5	−2	9	Advance to the Final stage
7	Castanhal (A)	6	2	2	2	4	5	−1	8	Advance to the Final stage
8	Santa Rosa (A)	6	2	1	3	4	7	−3	7	Advance to the Final stage
9	São Raimundo	6	1	3	2	6	8	−2	6	
10	Amazônia Independente	6	1	3	2	7	11	−4	6	
11	Bragantino (R)	6	1	2	3	6	7	−1	5	2027 Paraense 2nd Division
12	São Francisco (R)	6	1	2	3	4	5	−1	5	2027 Paraense 2nd Division

Updated to match(es) played on 15 February 2026. Source: Globo Esporte
Rules for classification: 1) points; 2) wins; 3) goal difference; 4) goals scored; 5) fewest red cards; 6) fewest yellow cards; 7) drawing of lots.
(A) Advance to a further round; (R) Relegated

== Final stage ==
=== Quarter-finals ===
Team 1	Score	Team 2
Cametá	2–0	Santa Rosa
Águia de Marabá	1–1 (4–5 p)	Remo
Capitão Poço	0–1	Castanhal
Paysandu	5–1	Tuna Luso

=== Semi-finals ===
Team 1	Score	Team 2
Cametá	2–3	Remo
Paysandu	1–0	Castanhal

=== Finals ===
1 March 2026
17:00 UTC –3

Remo	1–2	Paysandu
João Pedro 75' (pen.)	Report	Caio Mello 6'; Marcinho 32'

Mangueirão, Belém
Attendance: 24,816
Referee: Ramon Abatti
8 March 2026
17:00 UTC –3

Paysandu	0–0	Remo
	Report

Mangueirão, Belém
Attendance: 46,809
Referee: Wagner do Nascimento Magalhães

Paysandu won 2–1 on aggregate.
