= Samuel Santos =

Samuel Santos may refer to:

- Samuel Santos López (born 1938), Nicaraguan politician
- Samuel Santos (footballer) (born 1990), Brazilian footballer
