= Vinícius Leite =

Brazilian footballer (born 1993)

Personal information
- Full name: Vinícius Leite Silva
- Date of birth: 25 October 1993 (age 33)
- Place of birth: Iporá, Brazil
- Height: 1.76 m (5 ft 9 in)
- Position: Forward

Team information
- Current team: Amazonas

Youth career
- Umuarama
- 2012–2013: Grêmio Barueri

Senior career*
Years	Team	Apps	(Gls)
2010–2012	Umuarama	24	(8)
2013	Grêmio Barueri	3	(0)
2013–2014	Grêmio Osasco	5	(0)
2014–2015	Audax Rio	14	(4)
2016	Portuguesa-RJ	1	(0)
2017	Iporá	13	(2)
2017–2018	Vila Nova	30	(2)
2019–2020	Paysandu	52	(9)
2020–2022	Avaí	74	(3)
2022	→ Novorizontino (loan)	8	(0)
2023	Vila Nova	10	(0)
2023–2024	Paysandu	25	(3)
2024–2025	Botafogo-PB	14	(2)
	→ Velo Clube (loan)	8	(0)
2025	Inter de Limeira	12	(1)
2026–	Amazonas	12	(0)
- * Club domestic league appearances and goals as of 10 November 2026

Vinícius Leite Silva (born 25 October 1993), known as Vinícius Leite, is a Brazilian footballer who plays as a forward for Amazonas.

== Club career ==
Born in Iporá, Goiás, Vinícius began his career with local side Umuarama, playing in the third division of the Campeonato Goiano. He moved to Grêmio Barueri in 2012, initially playing for the under-20 side before making his first team debut in the following year.

Vinícius joined Grêmio Osasco for the 2013 Copa Paulista, before subsequently representing Audax Rio, Portuguesa-RJ and Iporá. He impressed with the latter club, and signed a contract with Série B side Vila Nova on 12 April 2017.

On 18 December 2018, Vinícius agreed to a deal with Paysandu for the ensuing campaign. A regular starter, he left the club in November 2020 to join Avaí.

During the 2021 Série B, Vinícius was a regular starter as the club achieved promotion to the Série A.

== Career statistics ==
As of 13 January 2022

Club	Season	League			State League		Cup		Continental		Other		Total	
Club	Season	Division	Apps	Goals	Apps	Goals	Apps	Goals	Apps	Goals	Apps	Goals	Apps	Goals
Umuarama	2010	Goiano 3ª Divisão	—		1	0	—		—		—		1	0
Umuarama	2011	Goiano 3ª Divisão	—		10	3	—		—		—		10	3
Umuarama	2012	Goiano 3ª Divisão	—		13	5	—		—		—		13	5
Umuarama	Total		—		24	8	—		—		—		24	8
Grêmio Barueri	2013	Paulista A2	—		3	0	—		—		—		3	0
Grêmio Osasco	2013	Paulista A2	—		0	0	—		—		6 (Note: Appearance(s) in Copa Paulista)	0	6	0
Grêmio Osasco	2014	Paulista A2	—		5	0	—		—		—		5	0
Grêmio Osasco	Total		—		5	0	—		—		6	0	11	0
Audax Rio	2014	Carioca Série B	—		0	0	—		—		6 (Note: Appearance(s) in Copa Rio)	4	6	4
Audax Rio	2015	Carioca Série B	—		14	4	—		—		—		14	4
Audax Rio	Total		—		14	4	—		—		6	4	20	8
Portuguesa-RJ	2016	Série D	0	0	1	0	—		—		—		1	0
Iporá	2017	Goiano	—		13	2	—		—		—		13	2
Vila Nova	2017	Série B	4	0	—		—		—		—		4	0
Vila Nova	2018	Série B	18	0	8	2	3	0	—		—		29	2
Vila Nova	Total		22	0	8	2	3	0	—		—		33	2
Paysandu	2019	Série C	14	4	11	1	2	0	—		8 (Note: Appearance(s) in Copa Verde)	0	35	5
Paysandu	2020	Série C	14	2	13	2	2	0	—		—		29	4
Paysandu	Total		28	6	24	3	4	0	—		8	0	64	9
Avaí	2020	Série B	12	1	—		—		—		—		12	1
Avaí	2021	Série B	37	0	12	2	4	0	—		—		53	2
Avaí	2022	Série A	0	0	0	0	0	0	—		—		0	0
Avaí	Total		49	1	12	2	4	0	—		—		65	3
Career total			99	7	104	21	11	0	0	0	20	4	234	32

== Honours ==
Paysandu

- Campeonato Paraense: 2020, 2024
- Copa Verde: 2024

Avaí

- Campeonato Catarinense: 2021
