= Canaã Futebol Clube =

Brazilian association football club based in Canaã dos Carajás, Pará, Brazil

Canaã
- Full name: Canaã Futebol Clube
- Nickname(s): Falcão (Falcon)
- Founded: 1 January 2020; 5 years ago
- Ground: Benezão
- Capacity: 2,000
- President: Giliard Cohen
- League: Campeonato Paraense Série B1
- 2024: Paraense, 12th of 12 (relegated)
Home colors	Away colors

Canaã Futebol Clube, commonly referred to as Canaã, is a Brazilian professional football club based in Canaã dos Carajás, Pará founded on 1 January 2020. It competes in the Campeonato Paraense, the top flight of the Pará state football league.

== History ==
Founded in 2020 as Sport Real, the team moved to Canaã dos Carajás in 2023, where it changed its name and emblem. In the same year, he achieved promotion to the top flight of Pará state league.

== Stadium ==
Canaã play their home games at Benezão. The stadium has a maximum capacity of 2,000 people.

== Honours ==
- Campeonato Paraense Second Division
  - Winners (1): 2023
