= 2024 Copa Grão-Pará =

11th edition of a Brazilian association football competition

Tournament details
- Dates: 23 March – 11 April
- Teams: 6

Final positions
- Champions: Tuna Luso (1st title)
- Copa do Brasil: Tuna Luso

Tournament statistics
- Matches played: 5
- Goals scored: 15 (3 per match)

The 2024 Copa Grão-Pará was the first Copa Grão-Pará, a football state cup. Those eliminated in the quarter-finals and semi-finals of the Campeonato Paraense will take part.

Tuna Luso defeated São Francisco 2–1 to win their first title and a place in the first round of the 2025 Copa do Brasil.

== Teams ==
| Team (Berth) | Entry stage | Qualification method |
|---|---|---|
| Bragantino | First round | Eliminated in the quarter-finals of the Campeonato Paraense |
| Caeté | First round | Eliminated in the quarter-finals of the Campeonato Paraense |
| Santa Rosa | First round | Eliminated in the quarter-finals of the Campeonato Paraense |
| São Francisco | First round | Eliminated in the quarter-finals of the Campeonato Paraense |
| Águia de Marabá | Second round | Eliminated in the semi-finals of the Campeonato Paraense |
| Tuna Luso | Second round | Eliminated in the semi-finals of the Campeonato Paraense |

== First round ==
| Team 1 | Score | Team 2 |
|---|---|---|
| Caeté | 0–0 (1–3 p) | Santa Rosa |
| São Francisco | 6–4 | Bragantino |

== Second round ==
| Team 1 | Score | Team 2 |
|---|---|---|
| Tuna Luso | 1–0 | Santa Rosa |
| Águia de Marabá | 0–1 | São Francisco |

== Final ==
11 April 2024
20:00 UTC –3

| Tuna Luso | 2–1 | São Francisco |
|---|---|---|
| Jayme 45+4'; Dedé 64' | Report | Edgo 26' (pen.) |

Mangueirão, Belém
Attendance: 1,345
Referee: Olivaldo José Alves Moraes
