= União Esportiva =

- Full name: Sociedade Athlética União Esportiva
- Nicknames: Alvinegra; Tiva
- Founded: August 15, 1906
- Dissolved: 1967
- Ground: Baenão, Belém, Pará state, Brazil
- Capacity: 17,518
Home colors	Away colors

União Esportiva was a Brazilian football club based in Belém, Pará state. They won the Campeonato Paraense twice.

== History ==
The club was founded on August 15, 1906. União Esportiva won the Campeonato Paraense in 1908 and in 1910. The club folded in 1967.

== Honours ==
- Campeonato Paraense
  - Winners (2): 1908, 1910
  - Runners-up (3): 1923, 1928, 1929
- Torneio Início do Pará
  - Winners (2) 1924, 1927

== Stadium ==
União Esportiva played their home games at Baenão. The stadium has a maximum capacity of 17,518 people.
