= 2027 Copa Norte =

8th edition of a Brazilian association football competition

Tournament details
- Country: Brazil
- Dates: March – May
- Teams: 12

The 2027 Copa Norte will be the 8th edition of the football competition held in Brazil. Featuring 12 clubs, Acre, Amazonas, Pará, Rondônia and Roraima have two vacancies; Amapá with one. The other one berth was set according to CBF ranking.

== Qualified teams ==
Association	Team	Qualification method
(Acre (state)) Acre; 2 berths	Santa Cruz	2026 Campeonato Acreano champions
(Acre (state)) Acre; 2 berths	Rio Branco	2026 Campeonato Acreano runners-up
(Amapá) Amapá; 1 berth	Santos	2026 Campeonato Amapaense champions
(Amazonas (Brazilian state)) Amazonas; 2 berths	Nacional	2026 Campeonato Amazonense champions
(Amazonas (Brazilian state)) Amazonas; 2 berths	Amazonas	2026 Campeonato Amazonense runners-up
(Pará) Pará; 2+1 berths	Paysandu	2026 Campeonato Paraense champions
(Pará) Pará; 2+1 berths	Remo	2026 Campeonato Paraense runners-up
(Pará) Pará; 2+1 berths	Águia de Marabá	Best placed team in the 2027 CBF ranking not already qualified
(Rondônia) Rondônia; 2 berths	Guaporé	2026 Campeonato Rondoniense champions
(Rondônia) Rondônia; 2 berths	Rondoniense	2026 Campeonato Rondoniense runners-up
(Roraima) Roraima; 2 berths	GAS	2026 Campeonato Roraimense champions
(Roraima) Roraima; 2 berths	Baré	2026 Campeonato Roraimense runners-up
