= Clube Esportivo Nova Esperança =

CENE
- Full name: Clube Esportivo Nova Esperança
- Nickname(s): Furacão Amarelo (Yellow Hurricane)
- Founded: 13 December 1999; 25 years ago
- Dissolved: 2018
- Ground: Arena da Paz
- Capacity: 1,200
- Owner: Sun Myung Moon; Unification Church
- President: José Rodrigues
- 2015: Sul-Mato-Grossense, 12th of 12 (relegated)
Home colors	Away colors

Clube Esportivo Nova Esperança, or CENE as they are usually called, were a Brazilian football team.

== History ==
CENE were founded on 13 December 1999 in Jardim by a group of farm employees with the help of other farm employees and local businessmen.

The team was initially an amateur team, but the good performance of the squad brought investment. On December 13, 1999, the club became a professional team.

They adopted the name Clube Esportivo Nova Esperança and got transferred to Campo Grande in Mato Grosso do Sul.

Ever since their last title win, however, the club suffered from an internal crisis which hampered their performance and resulted in relegation from the league.

Despite requesting for a license in 2016, the club eventually ceased to operate in 2018, without playing any games in between.

== Home ground ==
CENE's home stadium was the Arena da Paz, also known as Olho do Furação, with a maximum capacity of 1,500 people.

== Ownership ==
The team was owned by Rev. Moon's Unification Church, as were Atlético Sorocaba.

== Honours ==
- Campeonato Sul-Matogrossense
  - Winners (6): 2002, 2004, 2005, 2011, 2013, 2014
  - Runners-up (2): 2003, 2007
- Copa MS
  - Winners (1): 2010
