= Nicolas (footballer, born 1989) =

Brazilian footballer

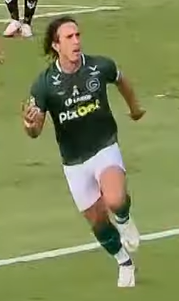
- Nicolas with Goiás in 2022

Personal information
- Full name: Nicolas Godinho Johann
- Date of birth: 4 October 1989 (age 37)
- Place of birth: Alegria, Brazil
- Height: 1.80 m (5 ft 11 in)
- Position: Forward

Team information
- Current team: Criciúma
- Number: 9

Youth career
- 2007–2008: Juventude
- 2008: → Austria Wien (loan)

Senior career*
Years	Team	Apps	(Gls)
2009	Gama	4	(0)
2009–2011	São Luiz	28	(5)
2010	→ Évian (loan)	0	(0)
2011	Criciúma	1	(0)
2011	Novo Hamburgo	0	(0)
2012	Chapecoense	12	(0)
2012–2013	Ypiranga	0	(0)
2013–2014	Cerâmica	0	(0)
2015	Brasil de Farroupilha	4	(0)
2016–2018	Caxias	47	(7)
2017	→ Pelotas (loan)	0	(0)
2018	Criciúma	19	(1)
2019–2021	Paysandu	103	(37)
2021	→ Goiás (loan)	27	(6)
2022–2023	Goiás	69	(23)
2023	Ceará	31	(3)
2024–2025	Paysandu	61	(21)
2025–	Criciúma	38	(13)
- * Club domestic league appearances and goals as of 15 April 2026

Nicolas Godinho Johann (born 4 October 1989) or simply Nicolas, is a Brazilian professional footballer who plays as a forward who plays for Criciúma.

== Career statistics ==
As of 30 June 2024

Appearances and goals by club, season and competition
Club	Season	League			State League		National cup		Continental		Other		Total	
Club	Season	Division	Apps	Goals	Apps	Goals	Apps	Goals	Apps	Goals	Apps	Goals	Apps	Goals
Goiás	2021	Série B	27	6	0	0	0	0	—		—		27	6
Goiás	2022	Série A	29	5	14	8	4	2	—		—		47	15
Goiás	2056	Série A	0	0	17	8	2	0	—		3	0	22	8
Goiás	Total		56	11	31	16	6	2	0	0	3	0	96	29
Ceará	2023	Série B	31	3	—		0	0	—		—		31	3
Paysandu	2019	Série C	20	5	13	4	2	0	—		6	3	42	12
Paysandu	2020	Série C	23	9	14	10	2	0	0	0	2	0	41	19
Paysandu	2021	Série C	6	1	13	5	2	0	0	0	—		21	6
Paysandu	2024	Série B	12	1	12	11	2	0	0	0	5	5	32	17
Paysandu	Total		61	16	52	35	8	0	0	0	13	8	121	61
Career total			148	30	83	46	14	2	0	0	16	8	261	86

== Honours ==
Caxias

- Campeonato Gaúcho Série A2: 2016

Paysandu

- Campeonato Paraense: 2020, 2021, 2024
- Copa Verde: 2024, 2025
- Super Copa Grão-Pará: 2025

Goiás

- Copa Verde: 2023
