= Copa Grão-Pará =

- Organiser(s): Federação Paraense de Futebol
- Founded: 2024; 2 years ago
- Region: Pará
- Teams: 6
- Qualifier for: Copa do Brasil (first round)
- Current champions: Águia de Marabá (1st title)
- Most championships: Tuna Luso; Águia de Marabá (1 title each)
- Broadcaster: TV Cultura do Pará
- 2026 Copa Grão-Pará

The Copa Grão-Pará is a state association football tournament organized by the Federação Paraense de Futebol. The tournament is made up of four teams eliminated in the quarter-finals of the Campeonato Paraense and two more from the semi-finals, making a total of six teams. The champion qualifies for the Copa do Brasil first round.

== List of champions ==
Season	Champions	Score	Runners-up
2024	Tuna Luso	2–1	São Francisco
2025	Águia de Marabá	1–1 (9–8 p)	Tuna Luso

== See also ==
- Super Copa Grão-Pará
