= Copa MS =

- Organiser(s): Federação de Futebol de Mato Grosso do Sul
- Founded: 2010
- Region: Mato Grosso do Sul, Brazil
- Teams: 6
- Qualifier for: Copa do Brasil
- Related competitions: Campeonato Sul-Mato-Grossense
- Most championships: CENE (1 title)

The Copa MS (English: MS Cup) is a tournament organized by Federação de Futebol de Mato Grosso do Sul in order to decide how club would be the representative of the state at the Copa do Brasil.

In 2011, the competition was abolished.

In 2026, the competition came back, but now the champion represents the state at the Copa do Brasil.

== List of champions ==
Season	Champions	Runners-up
2010	CENE	Maracaju
2026		
