= Eltinho =

Brazilian footballer (born 1987)

Personal information
- Full name: Elton Divino Celio
- Date of birth: 7 July 1987 (age 39)
- Place of birth: Guaíra, Brazil
- Height: 1.71 m (5 ft 7 in)
- Position: Left back

Team information
- Current team: Londrina

Youth career
- 2005–2006: Paraná

Senior career*
Years	Team	Apps	(Gls)
2006	Paraná	13	(2)
2007	→ Yokohama F. Marinos (loan)	0	(0)
2008	Desportivo Brasil	0	(0)
2008	→ Flamengo (loan)	1	(0)
2009–2010	Avaí	29	(4)
2010	Internacional	1	(0)
2010	Avaí	27	(4)
2011–2016	Coritiba	57	(1)
2013	→ Náutico (loan)	6	(0)
2014–2016	→ Avaí (loan)	46	(1)
2016–2017	J. Malucelli	24	(7)
2017	ABC	24	(1)
2018	Criciúma	7	(0)
2019–2021	Juventude	77	(8)
2021	Figueirense	4	(0)
2021–	Londrina	1	(0)
- * Club domestic league appearances and goals as of 14 March 2019

Elton Divino Celio (born 7 July 1987 in Guaíra, Paraná), commonly known as Eltinho, is a Brazilian footballer who plays for Londrina as a left back.

== Career ==
On signing for the team Eltinho was involved in a small scandal regarding his actual age. The Yokohama F. Marinos website stated his date of birth was July 7, 1987 but the website of his former club Paraná stated his date of birth as 1983. The Paraná Clube website has subsequently been removed. This anomaly was discovered by the supporters group MOIST (Marinos Official International Supporters Team).

Eltinho's favourite player is Ronaldo and his hobby is watching movies.

== Club statistics ==
(Correct as of December 6, 2009)

Club	Season	State League			Brazilian Série A			Brazilian Cup			Continental			Total		
Club	Season	Apps	Goals	Assists	Apps	Goals	Assists	Apps	Goals	Assists	Apps	Goals	Assists	Apps	Goals	Assists
Flamengo	2008	-	-	-	1	0	0	-	-	-	-	-	-	1	0	0
Avaí	2009	-	-	-	29	4	2	-	-	-	-	-	-	29	4	2

according to combined sources on the.

== Contract ==
- Flamengo 30 July 2008 to 31 December 2009.
