= Nenê Bonilha =

Brazilian footballer

Personal information
- Full name: Luis Otavio Bonilha de Oliveira
- Date of birth: 17 February 1992 (age 34)
- Place of birth: São João da Boa Vista, Brazil
- Height: 1.75 m (5 ft 9 in)
- Position: Midfielder

Team information
- Current team: Brasiliense

Youth career
- –2008«9: Esportiva Sanjoanense
- 2010: Paulista
- 2011: Corinthians

Senior career*
Years	Team	Apps	(Gls)
2010–2011	Paulista	0	(0)
2011–2015	Corinthians	0	(0)
2012	→ Grêmio Catanduvense (loan)	9	(0)
2012	→ Avaí (loan)	13	(0)
2013–2014	→ Audax (loan)	22	(0)
2014	→ Vila Nova (loan)	24	(1)
2015	→ Rio Claro (loan)	8	(0)
2015–2016	Nacional	24	(1)
2016–2018	Vitória Setúbal	37	(0)
2018	Fortaleza	16	(0)
2019	Veracruz	6	(0)
2019–2020	Fortaleza	10	(1)
2020–2021	Cuiabá	0	(0)
2022	São Bento	8	(0)
2022	Tombense	16	(2)
2023	Santo André	11	(0)
2023	Paysandu	11	(1)
2024	Portuguesa-RJ	11	(1)
2024–	Brasiliense	0	(0)
- * Club domestic league appearances and goals as of 26 May 2022

Luis Otavio Bonilha de Oliveira, known as Nenê Bonilha (17 February 1992), is a Brazilian professional footballer who plays as a central midfielder.

== Club career ==
He started in the youth of the Society Sports Sanjoanense in São João da Boa Vista, transferring later to the Paulista de Jundiaí in 2006. He later played for Audax São Paulo on loan from Corinthians.

== Career statistics ==
As of Updated match played 17 May 2025

Appearances and goals by club, season and competition
Club	Season	League			State League		National cup (Note: Includes Copa do Brasil, Taça de Portugal)		Continental		Other		Total	
Club	Season	Division	Apps	Goals	Apps	Goals	Apps	Goals	Apps	Goals	Apps	Goals	Apps	Goals
Corinthians	2011	Série A	0	0	1 (Note: Appearance(s) in Campeonato Paulista)	0	—		0	0	—		1	0
Corinthians	2012	Série A	0	0	0	0	—		0	0	0	0	0	0
Corinthians	2013	Série A	0	0	3	0	0	0	0	0	—		3	0
Corinthians	2014	Série A	0	0	0	0	0	0	—		—		0	0
Corinthians	2015	Série A	0	0	0	0	0	0	0	0	—		0	0
Corinthians	Total		0	0	4	0	0	0	0	0	0	0	4	0
Catanduvense (loan)	2012	—			9	0	—		—		—		9	0
Avaí (loan)	2013	Série B	13	0	0	0	0	0	—		—		13	0
Audax (loan)	2013	—			13 (Note: Appearance(s) in Campeonato Paulista Série A2)	0	—		—		16 (Note: Appearance(s) in Copa Paulista)	0	29	0
Audax (loan)	2014	—			9	0	—		—		—		9	0
Audax (loan)	Total		—		22	0	—		—		16	0	38	0
Vila Nova (loan)	2014	Série B	24	1	0	0	—		—		—		24	1
Rio Claro (loan)	2015	—			8	0	—		—		—		8	0
Nacional	2015-16	Primeira Liga	24	1	—		3	0	—		2 (Note: Appearance(s) in Taça da Liga)	0	29	1
Vitória Setúbal	2016-17	Primeira Liga	17	0	—		2	0	—		4	0	23	0
Vitória Setúbal	2017-18	Primeira Liga	20	0	—		1	0	—		3	0	24	0
Vitória Setúbal	Total		37	0	—		3	0	—		7	0	47	0
Fortaleza	2018	Série B	16	0	0	0	—		—		0	0	16	0
Veracruz	2018-19	Liga MX	6	0	—		1	0	—		—		7	0
Fortaleza	2019	Série A	6	0	0	0	0	0	—		—		6	0
Fortaleza	2020	Série A	0	0	4 (Note: Appearance(s) in Campeonato Cearense)	1	0	0	0	0	3 (Note: Appearance(S) in Copa do Nordeste)	0	7	1
Fortaleza	Total		6	0	4	1	0	0	0	0	3	0	13	1
Cuiabá	2020	Série B	14	0	0	0	4	0	—		1 (Note: Appearance(s) in Copa Verde)	0	19	0
São Bento	2022	—			8	0	—		—		—		8	0
Tombense	2022	Série B	16	2	0	0	0	0	—		—		16	2
Santo André	2023	Série D	0	0	11	0	—		—		—		11	0
Paysandu	2023	Série C	11	1	0	0	0	0	—		0	0	11	1
Portuguesa-RJ	2024	—			10 (Note: Appearance(s) in Campeonato Carioca)	1	1	0	—		—		11	1
Brasiliense	2024	Série D	14	4	0	0	0	0	—		0	0	14	4
Brasiliense	2025	—			0	0	—		—		2	0	2	0
Brasiliense	Total		14	4	0	0	0	0	—		2	0	16	4
Rio Branco (loan)	2025	Série D	5	1	0	0	0	0	—		—		5	1
Career total			186	10	76	2	12	0	0	0	31	0	305	12
