= Maycon (footballer, born 1998) =

Brazilian footballer

Personal information
- Full name: Maycon Matheus do Nascimento
- Date of birth: 21 May 1998 (age 28)
- Place of birth: Fernandópolis, Brazil
- Height: 1.88 m (6 ft 2 in)
- Position: Centre-back

Team information
- Current team: Noroeste
- Number: 44

Youth career
- 2013: Ponte Preta
- 2014–2015: Noroeste
- 2015–2018: Ferroviária

Senior career*
Years	Team	Apps	(Gls)
2017–2018	Ferroviária	0	(0)
2017	→ América-SP (loan)	4	(0)
2018	Portimonense	0	(0)
2019	Londrina	0	(0)
2020–	Noroeste	57	(1)
2020	→ Francana (loan)	1	(0)
2022	→ Pouso Alegre (loan)	8	(0)
2023	→ Amazonas (loan)	14	(1)
2024	→ Ferroviária (loan)	3	(0)
2025	→ Ferroviária (loan)	18	(0)
- * Club domestic league appearances and goals as of 18 December 2025

Maycon Matheus do Nascimento (born 21 May 1998), simply known as Maycon, is a Brazilian professional footballer who plays as a centre-back for Noroeste.

== Career ==
Maycon was born in Fernandópolis, São Paulo, and represented Ponte Preta, Noroeste and Ferroviária as a youth. He made his senior debut while on loan at América-SP in 2017, but never played for AFE and left for Portuguese side Portimonense in the following year.

On 31 January 2019, Maycon was presented at Londrina, but did not play. He moved to Noroeste in the following year, having a short loan stint at Francana before establishing himself as a starter.

Maycon started the 2022 season on loan at Pouso Alegre, and subsequently returned to Norusca after the 2022 Campeonato Mineiro. On 8 May 2023, he was announced at Amazonas also in a temporary deal, and helped the side to win the Série C.

Back to Noroeste on 5 December 2023, Maycon was a first-choice as the club achieved promotion from the Campeonato Paulista Série A2, and returned to Ferroviária on 19 April 2024, now on loan.

On 16 November 2024, Noroeste announced the return of Maycon to the 2025 Campeonato Paulista.

== Career statistics ==
As of 21 February 2025

Club	Season	League			State League		Cup		Continental		Other		Total	
Club	Season	Division	Apps	Goals	Apps	Goals	Apps	Goals	Apps	Goals	Apps	Goals	Apps	Goals
América-SP	2017	Paulista 2ª Divisão	—		4	0	—		—		—		4	0
Ferroviária	2018	Série D	0	0	0	0	—		—		—		0	0
Portimonense	2018–19	Primeira Liga	0	0	—		0	0	—		—		0	0
Londrina	2019	Série B	0	0	0	0	—		—		—		0	0
Noroeste	2020	Paulista A3	—		3	0	—		—		—		3	0
Noroeste	2021	Paulista A3	—		11	0	—		—		8 (Note: Appearance(s) in Copa Paulista)	0	19	0
Noroeste	2022	Paulista A3	—		0	0	—		—		—		0	0
Noroeste	2023	Paulista A2	—		13	0	—		—		—		13	0
Noroeste	2024	Paulista A2	—		20	0	—		—		—		20	0
Noroeste	2025	Paulista	—		10	1	—		—		—		10	1
Noroeste	Total		—		57	1	—		—		8	0	65	1
Francana (loan)	2020	Paulista 2ª Divisão	—		1	0	—		—		—		1	0
Pouso Alegre (loan)	2022	Série D	0	0	8	0	0	0	—		—		8	0
Amazonas (loan)	2023	Série C	14	1	—		—		—		—		14	1
Ferroviária (loan)	2024	Série C	3	0	—		—		—		—		3	0
Career total			17	1	70	1	0	0	0	0	8	0	95	2

== Honours ==
Amazonas

- Campeonato Brasileiro Série C: 2023
