= 2024 Campeonato Paraense =

Campeonato Paraense
- Season: 2024
- Champions: Paysandu (50th title)
- Relegated: Tapajós; Canaã
- Série D: Tuna Luso; Águia de Marabá
- Copa do Brasil: Paysandu (as Copa Verde winners); Remo; Águia de Marabá
- Copa Verde: Paysandu; Remo
- Matches: 62
- Goals: 149 (2.4 per match)
- Top goalscorer: Nicolas (11 goals)
- Biggest home win: Remo 5–0 Canaã (21 January 2024)
- Biggest away win: Águia de Marabá 0–3 Paysandu (27 January 2024); Bragantino 0–3 Paysandu (9 March 2024)
- Highest scoring: Remo 5–0 Canaã (21 January 2024); Castanhal 2–3 Caeté (8 February 2024); Remo 2–3 Tuna Luso (8 February 2024)
- Highest attendance: 48,180; Paysandu 0–0 Remo (4 February 2024)
- Lowest attendance: 16; Santa Rosa 1–1 Águia de Marabá (3 February 2024)

The 2024 Campeonato Paraense was the 112th edition of Pará's top professional football league. The competition started on 20 January and ended on 14 April. Paysandu won the championship for the 50th time.

== Format ==
Three groups with four clubs, with the teams of one group facing those of the other two. The eight best teams in the overall standings advance to the final stage. The matches of the quarter-finals, semi-finals and the finals will be played on a home-and-away two-legged basis.

The two worst teams in the overall standings will be relegated to the 2025 Campeonato Paraense Second Division. The four teams eliminated in the quarter-finals and the two teams eliminated in the semi-finals will be transferred to the Copa Grão-Pará.

The champion and the runner-up qualify to the 2025 Copa do Brasil and the 2025 Copa Verde. The best two teams who isn't on Campeonato Brasileiro Série A, Série B or Série C qualifies to 2025 Campeonato Brasileiro Série D.

== Participating teams ==
Locations of the 2024 Campeonato Paraense teams
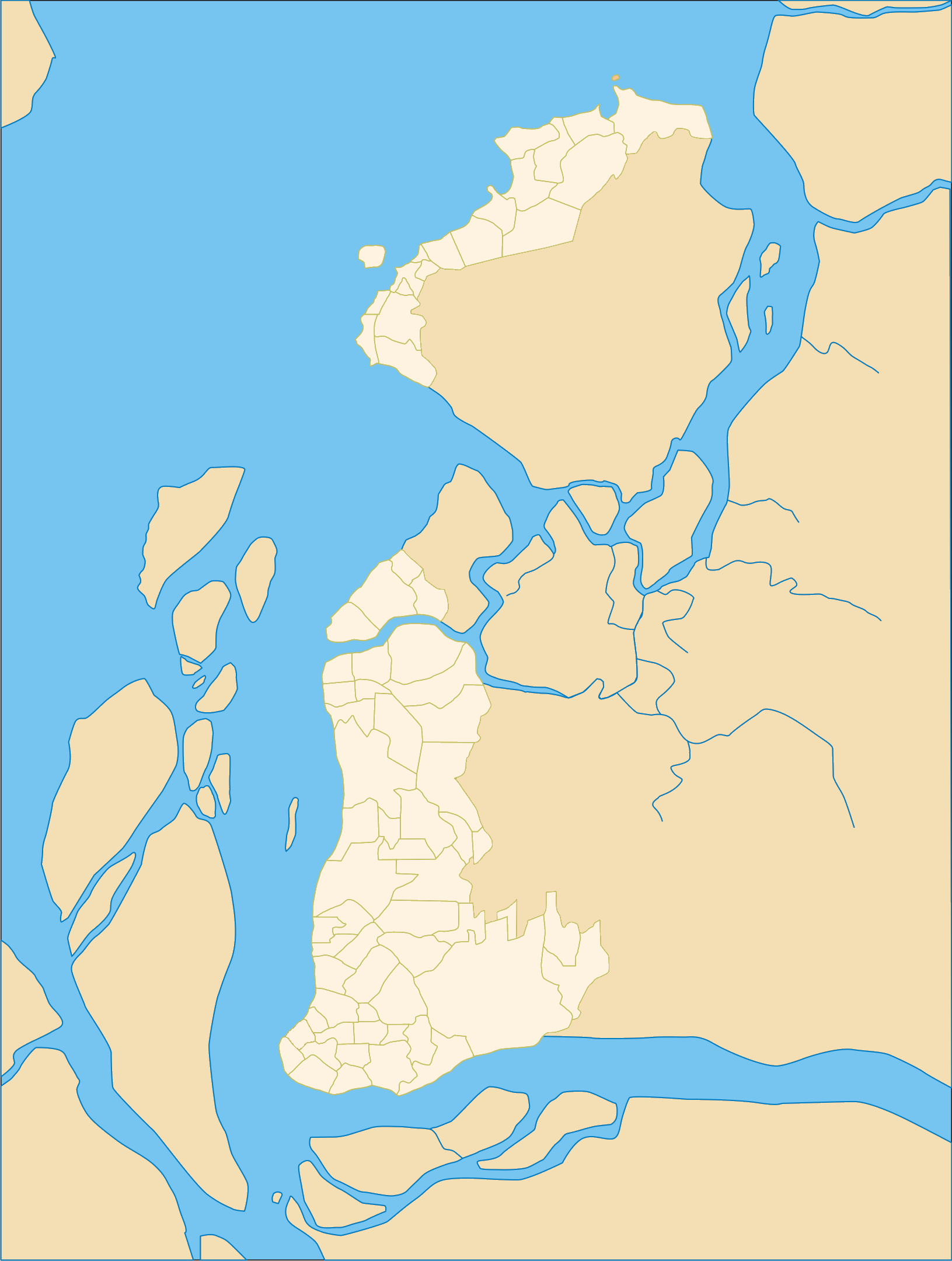
Locations of the 2024 Campeonato Paraense teams – Belém

Club	Home city	Head coach	2023 result
Águia de Marabá	Marabá	Mathaus Sodré	1st
Bragantino	Bragança	Marquinhos Taíra	10th
Caeté	Bragança	Artur Oliveira	8th
Cametá	Cametá	Júnior Amorim	4th
Canaã	Canaã dos Carajás	Léo Goiano	1st (2nd Division)
Castanhal	Castanhal	Emerson Almeida	6th
Paysandu	Belém	Hélio dos Anjos	3rd
Remo	Belém	Gustavo Morínigo	2nd
Santa Rosa	Belém	João Nasser	2nd (2nd Division)
São Francisco	Santarém	Samuel Cândido	5th
Tapajós	Santarém	Fábio Oliveira	9th
Tuna Luso	Belém	Júlio César Nunes	7th

=== Managerial changes ===
Team	Outgoing manager	Date of vacancy	Incoming manager	Date of appointment
Cametá	Uidemar	25 January 2024	Júnior Amorim	25 January 2024
Águia de Marabá	Rafael Jaques	27 January 2024	Mathaus Sodré	29 January 2024
Canaã	Emerson Almeida	1 February 2024	Léo Goiano	2 February 2024
Castanhal	Wilton Bezerra	8 February 2024	Emerson Almeida	9 February 2024
Bragantino	Rogerinho Gameleira	26 February 2024	Marquinhos Taíra	29 February 2024
Santa Rosa	Rodrigo Reis	26 February 2024	João Nasser	29 February 2024
Tapajós	Alexandre Finazzi	27 February 2024	Fábio Oliveira	29 February 2024
Remo	Ricardo Catalá	28 February 2024	Gustavo Morínigo	4 March 2024

== League phase ==
Pos	Team	Pld	W	D	L	GF	GA	GD	Pts	Qualification or relegation
1	Paysandu (A)	8	6	2	0	12	2	+10	20	Advance to the Final stage
2	Tuna Luso (A)	8	4	4	0	17	8	+9	16	Advance to the Final stage
3	Remo (A)	8	4	2	2	14	6	+8	14	Advance to the Final stage
4	Caeté (A)	8	3	3	2	10	9	+1	12	Advance to the Final stage
5	Águia de Marabá (A)	8	3	3	2	5	7	−2	12	Advance to the Final stage
6	Santa Rosa (A)	8	3	2	3	4	7	−3	11	Advance to the Final stage
7	São Francisco (A)	8	2	3	3	6	6	0	9	Advance to the Final stage
8	Bragantino (A)	8	2	3	3	7	8	−1	9	Advance to the Final stage
9	Cametá	8	2	3	3	7	9	−2	9	
10	Castanhal	8	1	3	4	8	12	−4	6	
11	Tapajós (R)	8	1	2	5	5	12	−7	5	2024 Paraense 2nd Division
12	Canaã (R)	8	0	4	4	4	13	−9	4	2024 Paraense 2nd Division

Updated to match(es) played on 4 March 2024. Source: Globo Esporte
(A) Advance to a further round; (R) Relegated

== Final stage ==
=== Quarter-finals ===
Team 1	Agg.	Team 2	1st leg	2nd leg
Bragantino	1–6	Paysandu	0–3	1–3
Águia de Marabá	4–0	Caeté	2–0	2–0
São Francisco	2–2 (2–4 p)	Tuna Luso	1–0	1–2
Santa Rosa	0–5	Remo	0–3	0–2

=== Semi-finals ===
Team 1	Agg.	Team 2	1st leg	2nd leg
Águia de Marabá	1–5	Paysandu	1–1	0–4
Tuna Luso	1–4	Remo	1–2	0–2

=== Finals ===
7 April 2024
17:00 UTC –3

Remo	0–2	Paysandu
	Report	Jean Dias 18'; García 90+2'

Mangueirão, Belém
Attendance: 28,359
Referee: Bráulio da Silva Machado
14 April 2024
17:00 UTC –3

Paysandu	1–1	Remo
Nicolas 57' (pen.)	Report	Ronald 63'

Mangueirão, Belém
Attendance: 32,907
Referee: Paulo César Zanovelli da Silva

Paysandu won 3–1 on aggregate.
