= Samuel Santos (footballer) =

Brazilian footballer

Personal information
- Full name: Samuel Henrique dos Santos Eleotério
- Date of birth: 25 April 1990 (age 36)
- Place of birth: Caçapava, Brazil
- Height: 1.77 m (5 ft 9 1/2 in)
- Position: Right back

Team information
- Current team: Sampaio Corrêa

Youth career
- Palmeiras

Senior career*
Years	Team	Apps	(Gls)
2008–2010	Palmeiras B	15	(0)
2011–2012	Mirassol	24	(0)
2011	→ ABC (loan)	9	(0)
2012–2014	São Caetano	46	(3)
2014	Bragantino	22	(1)
2015	Santo André	11	(1)
2015–2016	Botafogo-SP	33	(5)
2016	Marítimo	6	(0)
2017	Botafogo-SP	29	(1)
2018	Figueirense	10	(0)
2018	São Bento	11	(0)
2019	Albirex Niigata	4	(0)
2020–2021	Juventude	20	(2)
2021	→ Mirassol (loan)	7	(1)
2021	→ Guarani (loan)	2	(0)
2022–2023	Londrina	34	(0)
2023	Paysandu		
2023–	Sampaio Corrêa	12	(0)
- * Club domestic league appearances and goals as of 11 November 2023

Samuel Henrique dos Santos Eleotério (born 25 April 1990), known as Samuel Santos, is a Brazilian professional footballer who plays as a right back for Sampaio Corrêa.

On 31 July 2016, Samuel Santos signed with Marítimo.
