= Capitão Poço Esporte Clube =

Brazilian association football club based in Capitão Poço, Pará, Brazil

Capitão Poço
- Full name: Capitão Poço Esporte Clube
- Nicknames: CAP; Laranja Mecânica (Clockwork Orange)
- Founded: 7 September 2018; 7 years ago
- Ground: Rufinão
- Capacity: 4,000
- President: Benedito Araújo
- Head coach: Samuel Cândido
- League: Campeonato Paraense
- 2025: Paraense, 7th of 12
| Home colors | Away colors |

Capitão Poço Esporte Clube, commonly referred to as Capitão Poço, is a Brazilian professional club based in Capitão Poço, Pará founded on 7 September 2018. It competes in the Campeonato Paraense, the top flight of the Pará state football league.

== History ==
Founded in 2018, Capitão Poço made their professional football debut in 2021 when they played in the Campeonato Paraense Second Division. In 2024, he achieved promotion to the state elite.

== Stadium ==
It plays its matches at Rufinão. The stadium has a capacity of 4,000 people.

After renovation work at José Rufinão de Souza Municipal Stadium was completed in 2019, the club entered the state under-20 championship and initiated a project to compete professionally.
