= Santa Rosa Esporte Clube =

Brazilian association football club

Santa Rosa
- Full name: Santa Rosa Esporte Clube
- Nickname: Macaco-Prego (Tufted capuchin)
- Founded: 6 October 1925; 100 years ago
- Ground: Estádio Abelardo Conduru
- Capacity: 3,000
- President: Roma Merabet
- Head coach: Rodrigo Reis
- League: Campeonato Paraense
- 2023: Paraense 2nd Division, 2nd of 20 (promoted)
| Home colors | Away colors |

Santa Rosa Esporte Clube, commonly referred to as Santa Rosa, is a Brazilian professional club based in Icoaraci, administrative district of the city of Belém, Pará founded on 6 October 1925. It competes in the Campeonato Paraense, the top flight of the Pará state football league.

== History ==
The club was founded on January 6, 1924. They competed in the Série C in 1997, when they were eliminated in the Round of 16.

== Stadium ==
Santa Rosa Esporte Clube play their home games at Estádio Abelardo Conduru. The stadium has a maximum capacity of 3,000 people.
