= Campeonato Paraense =

Football league in Pará, Brazil

- Organising body: FPF
- Founded: 1908; 118 years ago (as an amateur Campeonato Paraense); 1945; 81 years ago (as the professional Campeonato Paraense)
- Country: Brazil
- State: Pará
- Level on pyramid: 1
- Relegation to: Paraense 2nd Division
- Domestic cup(s): Copa Grão-Pará; Super Copa Grão-Pará
- Current champions: Paysandu (51st title) (2026)
- Most championships: Paysandu (51 titles)
- Broadcaster(s): TV Cultura do Pará
- Website: FPF Official website
- Current: 2026 Campeonato Paraense

The Campeonato Paraense, nicknamed Parazão, is the top-flight professional state football league in the Brazilian state of Pará. It is run by the Pará Football Federation (FPF).

== List of champions ==
=== Amateur era ===
Season	Champions	Runners-up
1908	União Esportiva (1)	Sport Pará
1909	Not held	
1910	União Esportiva (2)	Guarany
1911–1912	Not held	
1913	Remo (1)	Norte Club
1914	Remo (2)	Paysandu
1915	Remo (3)	Paysandu
1916	Remo (4)	Paysandu
1917	Remo (5)	Paysandu
1918	Remo (6)	Paysandu
1919	Remo (7)	Paysandu
1920	Paysandu (1)	Remo
1921	Paysandu (2)	Remo
1922	Paysandu (3)	Remo
1923	Paysandu (4)	União Esportiva
1924	Remo (8)	Paysandu
1925	Remo (9)	Paysandu
1926	Remo (10)	Paysandu
1927	Paysandu (5)	Remo
1928	Paysandu (6)	União Esportiva
1929	Paysandu (7)	União Esportiva
1930	Remo (11)	Paysandu
1931	Paysandu (8)	Luso Brasileiro
1932	Paysandu (9)	Guarany
1933	Remo (12)	Paysandu
1934	Paysandu (10)	Tuna Luso
1935	Not held	
1936	Remo (13)	Paysandu
1937	Tuna Luso (1)	Paysandu
1938	Tuna Luso (2)	Nacional
1939	Paysandu (11)	Remo
1940	Remo (14)	Tuna Luso
1941	Tuna Luso (3)	Paysandu
1942	Paysandu (12)	Tuna Luso
1943	Paysandu (13)	Tuna Luso
1944	Paysandu (14)	Remo

=== Professional era ===
Season	Champions	Runners-up
1945	Paysandu (15)	Tuna Luso
1946	Not held	
1947	Paysandu (16)	Remo
1948	Tuna Luso (4)	Paysandu
1949	Remo (15)	Paysandu
1950	Remo (16)	Tuna Luso
1951	Tuna Luso (5)	Remo
1952	Remo (17)	Paysandu
1953	Remo (18)	Tuna Luso
1954	Remo (19)	Paysandu
1955	Tuna Luso (6)	Paysandu
1956	Paysandu (17)	Remo
1957	Paysandu (18)	Remo
1958	Tuna Luso (7)	Remo
1959	Paysandu (19)	Remo
1960	Remo (20)	Paysandu
1961	Paysandu (20)	Remo
1962	Paysandu (21)	Tuna Luso
1963	Paysandu (22)	Tuna Luso
1964	Remo (21)	Tuna Luso
1965	Paysandu (23)	Remo
1966	Paysandu (24)	Remo
1967	Paysandu (25)	Remo
1968	Remo (22)	Paysandu
1969	Paysandu (26)	Remo
1970	Tuna Luso (8)	Paysandu
1971	Paysandu (27)	Remo
1972	Paysandu (28)	Tuna Luso
1973	Remo (23)	Tuna Luso
1974	Remo (24)	Paysandu
1975	Remo (25)	Paysandu
1976	Paysandu (29)	Remo
1977	Remo (26)	Paysandu
1978	Remo (27)	Paysandu
1979	Remo (28)	Paysandu
1980	Paysandu (30)	Remo
1981	Paysandu (31)	Remo
1982	Paysandu (32)	Remo
1983	Tuna Luso (9)	Remo
1984	Paysandu (33)	Tuna Luso
1985	Paysandu (34)	Remo
1986	Remo (29)	Tuna Luso
1987	Paysandu (35)	Remo
1988	Tuna Luso (10)	Remo
1989	Remo (30)	Paysandu
1990	Remo (31)	Paysandu
1991	Remo (32)	Tuna Luso
1992	Paysandu (36)	Remo
1993	Remo (33)	Paysandu
1994	Remo (34)	Paysandu
1995	Remo (35)	Paysandu
1996	Remo (36)	Tuna Luso
1997	Remo (37)	Paysandu
1998	Paysandu (37)	Remo
1999	Remo (38)	Paysandu
2000	Paysandu (38)	Castanhal
2001	Paysandu (39)	Remo
2002	Paysandu (40)	Tuna Luso
2003	Remo (39)	Tuna Luso
2004	Remo (40)	Paysandu
2005	Paysandu (41)	Remo
2006	Paysandu (42)	Ananindeua
2007	Remo (41)	Tuna Luso
2008	Remo (42)	Águia de Marabá
2009	Paysandu (43)	São Raimundo
2010	Paysandu (44)	Águia de Marabá
2011	Independente (1)	Paysandu
2012	Cametá (1)	Remo
2013	Paysandu (45)	Paragominas
2014	Remo (43)	Paysandu
2015	Remo (44)	Independente
2016	Paysandu (46)	São Francisco
2017	Paysandu (47)	Remo
2018	Remo (45)	Paysandu
2019	Remo (46)	Independente
2020	Paysandu (48)	Remo
2021	Paysandu (49)	Tuna Luso
2022	Remo (47)	Paysandu
2023	Águia de Marabá (1)	Remo
2024	Paysandu (50)	Remo
2025	Remo (48)	Paysandu
2026	Paysandu (51)	Remo

=== Titles by club ===
Teams in bold stills active.

Rank	Club	Winners	Winning years
1	**Paysandu**	51	1920, 1921, 1922, 1923, 1927, 1928, 1929, 1931, 1932, 1934, 1939, 1942, 1943, 1944, 1945, 1947, 1956, 1957, 1959, 1961, 1962, 1963, 1965, 1966, 1967, 1969, 1971, 1972, 1976, 1980, 1981, 1982, 1984, 1985, 1987, 1992, 1998, 2000, 2001, 2002, 2005, 2006, 2009, 2010, 2013, 2016, 2017, 2020, 2021, 2024, 2026
2	**Remo**	48	1913, 1914, 1915, 1916, 1917, 1918, 1919, 1924, 1925, 1926, 1930, 1933, 1936, 1940, 1949, 1950, 1952, 1953, 1954, 1960, 1964, 1968, 1973, 1974, 1975, 1977, 1978, 1979, 1986, 1989, 1990, 1991, 1993, 1994, 1995, 1996, 1997, 1999, 2003, 2004, 2007, 2008, 2014, 2015, 2018, 2019, 2022, 2025
3	**Tuna Luso**	10	1937, 1938, 1941, 1948, 1951, 1955, 1958, 1970, 1983, 1988
4	União Esportiva	2	1908, 1910
5	**Águia de Marabá**	1	2023
5	**Independente**	1	2011
5	**Cametá**	1	2012

=== By city ===
City	Championships	Clubs
Belém	111	Paysandu (51), Remo (48), Tuna Luso (10), União Esportiva (2)
Cametá	1	Cametá (1)
Marabá	1	Águia de Marabá (1)
Tucuruí	1	Independente (1)

== See also ==
- Copa Grão-Pará
- Super Copa Grão-Pará
- Campeonato Paraense Second Division
