= Tuna Luso Brasileira =

Brazilian association football club based in Belém, Pará

Tuna Luso
- Full name: Tuna Luso Brasileira
- Nicknames: Águia do Souza (Souza's Eagle); Águia Guerreira (Warrior Eagle); Elite do Norte (Northern Elite)
- Founded: 1 January 1903; 123 years ago
- Ground: Estádio Francisco Vasques; Mangueirão
- Capacity: 5,000; 55,000
- President: Miltoniel Santos
- Head coach: Robson Melo
- League: Campeonato Brasileiro Série D Campeonato Paraense
- 2025 2025: Série D, 18th of 64; Paraense, 3rd of 12
- Website: tunalusobrasileira.com.br
Home colors	Away colors	Third colors

Tuna Luso Brasileira, commonly referred to as Tuna Luso, is a Brazilian professional football club based in Belém, Pará founded on 1 January 1903. It competes in the Campeonato Brasileiro Série D, the fourth tier of Brazilian football, as well as in the Campeonato Paraense, the top flight of the Pará state football league.

== History ==
Tuna Luso was founded initially as a musical band. It occurred because the Portuguese cruiser Dom Carlos was going to visit the port of Belém on November 12, 1902. Some Portuguese youths, residing in the city, decided to found a musical band to receive their fellow countrymen. The name they chose to the band was Tuna Luso Caixeiral. Tuna means popular orchestra, Luso means Portuguese, and Caixeiral means commerce employee. Later, the club changed its name to Tuna Luso Comercial, and years later changed its name again, this time to Tuna Luso Brasileira. The club began entering sports in 1906, when it opened a rowing department. Football was introduced in 1915, but the team only entered the state championship for the first time in 1933.

In 1937, Tuna Luso won its first state championship. In 1985, Tuna Luso won the second division of the Brazilian National Championship. In 1992, Tuna Luso won the third division of the Brazilian National Championship.

== Rivals ==
Tuna Luso greatest rivals are Paysandu and Remo.

== Symbols ==
The club's mascot is an eagle.

== Honours ==
=== Official tournaments ===
National
Competitions	Titles	Seasons
Campeonato Brasileiro Série B	1	1985
Campeonato Brasileiro Série C	1	1992
State
Competitions	Titles	Seasons
Campeonato Paraense	10	1937, 1938, 1941, 1948, 1951, 1955, 1958, 1970, 1983, 1988
Campeonato Paraense Second Division	1	2020

=== Others tournaments ===
==== International ====
- Queen Wilhelmina Tournament (1): 1949
- Torneio Internacional de Belém (1): 1977
- Cayenne International Tournament (1): 1985

==== State ====
- Copa Grão-Pará (1): 2024
- Taça Cidade de Belém (1): 2007
- Taça ACLEP (2): 2011, 2012
- Torneio Início do Pará (10): 1941, 1942, 1943, 1947, 1948, 1953, 1983, 1990, 1991, 1997

=== Runners-up ===
- Torneio do Norte (1): 1970
- Campeonato Paraense (19): 1934, 1940, 1942, 1943, 1945, 1950, 1953, 1962, 1963, 1964, 1972, 1984, 1986, 1991, 1996, 2002, 2003, 2007, 2021
- Super Copa Grão-Pará (1): 2025
- Campeonato Paraense Second Division (1): 2014

=== Women's Football ===
- Campeonato Paraense de Futebol Feminino (4): 2011, 2013, 2014, 2024
