= 2022 Clube do Remo season =

2022 season of Brazilian association football team

Remo
2022 season
- President: Fábio Bentes
- Head coach: Paulo Bonamigo (until 19 June 2022); Gerson Gusmão
- Stadium: Baenão
- Campeonato Brasileiro Série C: 12th
- Campeonato Paraense: 1st
- Copa do Brasil: Third round
- Highest home attendance: 13,197 (vs. Paysandu, 3 July 2022)
- Lowest home attendance: 3,147 (vs. Tapajós, 10 February 2022)
Home colors	Away colors	Third colors

The 2022 season was the 109th in Remo's existence. This season Remo participated in the Campeonato Brasileiro Série C, the Campeonato Paraense and the Copa do Brasil.

Remo finished the Campeonato Brasileiro Série C in the 12th place, missing out on the top eight places that would advance to the second stage and consequently failing to promotion to Série B of the following year. The club won the Campeonato Paraense by the 47th time. In the Copa do Brasil, Remo was eliminated in the third round by Cruzeiro.

Remo was also going to play in the Copa Verde, but gave up the competition.

== Players ==
=== Squad information ===
Numbers in parentheses denote appearances as substitute.

As of 14 August 2022

Squad Number	Position	Nat.	Name	Date of Birth (Age)		
Squad Number	Position	Nat.	Name	Date of Birth (Age)	Apps	Goals
1	GK	BRA	Vinícius	9 November 1984 (aged 37)	30	0
2	DF	BRA	Ricardo Luz	23 February 1995 (aged 27)	23 (1)	0
3	DF	BRA	Daniel Felipe	31 January 1992 (aged 30)	23	4
4	MF	BRA	Anderson Uchôa	4 February 1991 (aged 31)	32	3
6	DF	BRA	Marlon	14 September 1985 (aged 36)	33	0
7	FW	BRA	Bruno Alves	13 September 1992 (aged 29)	27 (5)	7
8	MF	BRA	Pablo Roberto	14 November 1999 (aged 22)	1 (1)	0
9	FW	BRA	Brenner	1 March 1994 (aged 28)	31 (1)	11
10	MF	BRA	Jean Patrick	25 June 1992 (aged 30)	2 (7)	0
12	MF	BRA	Erick Flores	30 April 1989 (aged 33)	23 (3)	5
13	DF	BRA	Wendel Lomar	27 May 1996 (aged 26)	2	0
14	DF	BRA	Everton Sena	14 June 1991 (aged 31)	10 (2)	0
15	FW	BRA	Ronald	10 August 2002 (aged 20)	6 (9)	0
16	MF	BRA	Paulinho Curuá	11 May 1997 (aged 25)	13 (12)	1
17	FW	BRA	Thiaguinho	3 April 1998 (aged 24)	1 (1)	0
18	MF	BRA	Henrique	20 January 2002 (aged 20)	0 (1)	0
20	MF	BRA	Soares	30 September 1997 (aged 24)	1 (1)	0
21	DF	BRA	Renan Castro	8 September 1995 (aged 26)	5 (7)	0
22	MF	BRA	Marciel	8 March 1995 (aged 27)	12 (12)	0
23	DF	BRA	Celsinho	15 March 1988 (aged 34)	6 (2)	0
26	FW	BRA	Vanílson	26 August 1990 (aged 31)	4 (14)	3
28	FW	BRA	Netto	28 February 1998 (aged 24)	7 (7)	1
31	DF	BRA	Leonan	28 October 1995 (aged 26)	21 (1)	3
36	DF	BRA	Igor Morais	28 April 1998 (aged 24)	2 (1)	0
37	MF	BRA	Anderson Paraíba	25 January 1991 (aged 31)	3 (5)	0
77	FW	BRA	Raul	4 May 2000 (aged 22)	1 (5)	0
88	MF	BRA	Marco Antônio	9 July 2000 (aged 22)	7 (11)	1
89	FW	BRA	Leandro Carvalho	10 May 1995 (aged 27)	4 (3)	1
95	GK	BRA	Zé Carlos	11 February 1995 (aged 27)	5	0
99	DF	BRA	Rony	12 April 2000 (aged 22)	2 (7)	0
—	GK	BRA	Victor Lube	5 February 1994 (aged 28)	0	0
—	MF	BRA	Pingo	29 December 2001 (aged 20)	11 (1)	0
Players left the club during the playing season
10	MF	BRA	Felipe Gedoz	12 July 1993 (aged 28)	5 (4)	1
13	GK	BRA	Yago Darub	13 September 1999 (aged 22)	0	0
17	FW	BRA	Rodrigo Pimpão	23 October 1987 (aged 34)	9 (2)	1
20	MF	BRA	Albano	9 June 1997 (aged 25)	3 (4)	1
30	DF	BRA	Kevem	3 March 2000 (aged 22)	4 (3)	0
92	FW	BRA	Fernandinho	26 March 1992 (aged 30)	9 (7)	3
98	MF	BRA	Laílson	1 January 1998 (aged 24)	1 (6)	0
—	GK	BRA	Jorge Pazetti	18 April 2001 (aged 21)	0	0
—	DF	BRA	Paulo Henrique	30 January 1993 (aged 29)	6 (1)	0
—	MF	BRA	Tiago Miranda	2 August 1999 (aged 22)	0 (2)	0
—	FW	BRA	Luan	16 July 1996 (aged 25)	0 (3)	0
—	FW	BRA	Pedro Sena	8 September 2001 (aged 20)	0 (3)	0
—	FW	BRA	Tiago Mafra	21 August 2002 (aged 19)	0 (5)	0
—	FW	BRA	Veraldo	17 May 1999 (aged 22)	0 (4)	0
—	FW	BRA	Welthon	21 June 1992 (aged 29)	0 (3)	0

=== Top scorers ===
As of 14 August 2022

Place	Position	Name	Campeonato Brasileiro Série C	Campeonato Paraense	Copa do Brasil	Total
1	FW	Brenner	5	6	0	11
2	FW	Bruno Alves	1	6	0	7
3	MF	Erick Flores	1	4	0	5
4	DF	Daniel Felipe	3	0	1	4
5	FW	Vanílson	3	0	0	3
5	FW	Fernandinho	3	0	0	3
5	MF	Anderson Uchôa	1	2	0	3
5	DF	Leonan	2	1	0	3
9	FW	Leandro Carvalho	1	0	0	1
9	FW	Netto	1	0	0	1
9	FW	Rodrigo Pimpão	1	0	0	1
9	MF	Albano	1	0	0	1
9	MF	Marco Antônio	1	0	0	1
9	MF	Paulinho Curuá	1	0	0	1
9	MF	Felipe Gedoz	0	1	0	1
Own goals			0	0	1	1

=== Disciplinary record ===
As of 14 August 2022

Position	Name	Campeonato Brasileiro Série C		Campeonato Paraense		Copa do Brasil		Total	
Position	Name	Yellow card	Red card	Yellow card	Red card	Yellow card	Red card	Yellow card	Red card
DF	Daniel Felipe	8	1	3	0	0	0	11	1
DF	Leonan	5	1	1	0	0	0	6	1
MF	Paulinho Curuá	2	1	1	0	1	0	4	1
MF	Jean Patrick	2	1	0	0	0	0	2	1
MF	Anderson Uchôa	5	0	5	0	1	0	11	0
FW	Brenner	5	0	4	0	1	0	10	0
FW	Bruno Alves	5	0	3	0	0	0	8	0
DF	Ricardo Luz	2	0	5	0	0	0	7	0
DF	Marlon	3	0	4	0	0	0	7	0
FW	Rodrigo Pimpão	5	0	0	0	0	0	5	0
MF	Marciel	2	0	1	0	1	0	4	0
MF	Erick Flores	2	0	1	0	0	0	3	0
DF	Renan Castro	1	0	0	0	1	0	2	0
DF	Paulo Henrique	0	0	2	0	0	0	2	0
MF	Marco Antônio	1	0	1	0	0	0	2	0
MF	Pingo	0	0	2	0	0	0	2	0
FW	Leandro Carvalho	2	0	0	0	0	0	2	0
FW	Fernandinho	2	0	0	0	0	0	2	0
FW	Ronald	0	0	2	0	0	0	2	0
DF	Celsinho	1	0	0	0	0	0	1	0
DF	Igor Morais	1	0	0	0	0	0	1	0
DF	Kevem	1	0	0	0	0	0	1	0
DF	Rony	0	0	1	0	0	0	1	0
MF	Pablo Roberto	1	0	0	0	0	0	1	0
MF	Henrique	0	0	1	0	0	0	1	0
MF	Albano	1	0	0	0	0	0	1	0
MF	Felipe Gedoz	0	0	1	0	0	0	1	0
FW	Tiago Mafra	0	0	1	0	0	0	1	0
	TOTALS	57	4	39	0	5	0	101	4

== Kit ==
Supplier: Volt Sport / Main sponsor: Banpará

Home	Home alt. 1	Home alt. 2	Away	Away alt. 1	Third

== Transfers ==
=== In ===
Position	Name	From	Type	Source
DF	Ricardo Luz	(Brazil) Mirassol	Transfer	
FW	Welthon	Free agent	Transfer	
GK	Jorge Pazetti	(Brazil) Penapolense	Transfer	
DF	Rony	(Brazil) Castanhal	Transfer	
FW	Luan	(Brazil) São Paulo-RS	Transfer	
FW	Veraldo	(Brazil) Floresta	Transfer	
GK	Yago Darub	(Brazil) Flamengo	Transfer	
DF	Paulo Henrique	(Brazil) Concórdia	Transfer	
MF	Marco Antônio	(Brazil) Ceará	Transfer	
DF	Daniel Felipe	(Brazil) Botafogo-PB	Transfer	
FW	Bruno Alves	(Brazil) Brusque	Transfer	
DF	Everton Sena	Free agent	Transfer	
FW	Brenner	(Japan) Fagiano Okayama	Transfer	
MF	Marciel	(Brazil) Náutico	Transfer	
DF	Leonan	(Brazil) Portuguesa-RJ	Transfer	
FW	Raul	(Brazil) Cuiabá	Transfer	
FW	Rodrigo Pimpão	(Brazil) Operário Ferroviário	Transfer	
FW	Fernandinho	(Brazil) Água Santa	Transfer	
DF	Igor Morais	(Brazil) Corinthians	Loan	
FW	Netto	(Brazil) Ferroviária	Transfer	
MF	Jean Patrick	(Brazil) CRB	Loan	
DF	Renan Castro	(Brazil) Joinville	Loan	
FW	Vanílson	(Saudi Arabia) Arar	Transfer	
GK	Zé Carlos	(Brazil) Águia de Marabá	Transfer	
MF	Albano	(Brazil) Goiás	Loan	
DF	Celsinho	(Brazil) Inter de Limeira	Transfer	
MF	Anderson Paraíba	(Brazil) Botafogo-PB	Transfer	
FW	Leandro Carvalho	(Brazil) Ceará	Loan	
DF	Wendel Lomar	(Brazil) Sergipe	Transfer	
MF	Pablo Roberto	(Brazil) Vila Nova	Loan	
GK	Victor Lube	(Brazil) Tuna Luso	Transfer	
FW	Thiaguinho	(Brazil) Jacuipense	Loan	
MF	Soares	(Brazil) Atlético Cearense	Loan	

=== Out ===
Position	Name	To	Type	Source
GK	Rodrigo Josviaki	(Lithuania) Hegelmann	Rescission	
MF	Lucas Siqueira	(Brazil) Ituano	Rescission	
FW	Luan	(Brazil) Uberlândia	Rescission	
FW	Welthon	(Brazil) Castanhal	Rescission	
FW	Veraldo	(Brazil) Tocantinópolis	Rescission	
DF	Paulo Henrique	(Brazil) São Caetano	End of contract	
MF	Tiago Miranda	(Brazil) Aruko	End of contract	
MF	Felipe Gedoz	(Brazil) Brasiliense	Rescission	
GK	Jorge Pazetti	Free agent	Rescission	
DF	Kevem	(Brazil) Mirassol	Loan return	
MF	Laílson	(Brazil) Joinville	Rescission	
FW	Fernandinho	(Brazil) Brusque	Rescission	
FW	Rodrigo Pimpão	Free agent	Rescission	
MF	Albano	(Brazil) Goiás	Loan return	
GK	Yago Darub	Free agent	Rescission	

Notes

1. Following Luan's release, he later signed for Uberlândia.
2. Veraldo joined Tocantinópolis following his release.
3. Following Tiago Miranda's release, he later signed for Aruko.
4. Following Paulo Henrique's release, he later signed for São Caetano.
5. Following Felipe Gedoz's release, he later signed for Brasiliense.
6. Following Fernandinho's release, he later signed for Brusque.
7. Following Laílson's release, he later signed for Joinville.

== Competitions ==
Competition	First match	Last match	Starting round	Final position	Record							
Competition	First match	Last match	Starting round	Final position	Pld	W	D	L	GF	GA	GD	Win %
Campeonato Brasileiro Série C	9 April 2022	13 August 2022	First stage	12th	19	7	5	7	25	22	+3	36.84
Campeonato Paraense	27 January 2022	6 April 2022	Group stage	Winners	14	6	6	2	20	10	+10	42.86
Copa do Brasil	19 April 2022	12 May 2022	Third round	Third round	2	1	0	1	2	2	+0	50.00
Total					35	14	11	10	47	34	+13	40.00

Source: Competitions

=== Campeonato Brasileiro Série C ===
Win Draw Loss

==== First stage ====
Pos	Team	Pld	W	D	L	GF	GA	GD	Pts
10	Ypiranga	19	7	7	5	25	20	+5	28
11	São José	19	7	5	7	33	27	+6	26
12	Remo	19	7	5	7	25	22	+3	26
13	Manaus	19	6	7	6	16	21	−5	25
14	Confiança	19	6	5	8	12	17	−5	23

Source: CBF
Rules for classification: 1) points; 2) wins; 3) goal difference; 4) goals scored; 5) fewest red cards; 6) fewest yellow cards; 7) draw.

===== Matches =====
9 April 2022 1	Remo	2–1	Vitória	Belém
17:00 UTC−3	Leonan 10'; Daniel Felipe (yellow card) 67'; Brenner 87' (pen.); Fernandinho (yellow card) 90+3'	Report	Eduardo (yellow card) 12'; Salomão (yellow card) 53'; Alemão (yellow card) 74'; Iury (yellow card) 85'; Alisson Santos 88'	Stadium: Baenão; Attendance: 7,176; Referee: Yuri Elino Ferreira da Cruz

16 April 2022 2	Manaus	1–0	Remo	Manaus
19:00 UTC−3	Gilson (yellow card) 42'; Matheus Inácio (yellow card) 45'; Hélio Paraíba 85'	Report	Leonan (yellow card) 39'; Marco Antônio (yellow card) 81'	Stadium: Arena da Amazônia; Attendance: 0 Referee: Jonathan Antero Silva

23 April 2022 3	Remo	2–2	São José	Belém
19:00 UTC−3	Brenner 49', (yellow card) 64'; Rodrigo Pimpão (yellow card) 51', (goal) 55'	Report	Samuel (yellow card) 20'; Tiago Pedra (yellow card) 64' (yellow-red card) 80'; Cristiano 69'; Cláudio Maradona 71', (yellow card) 72'; Alexandre Villa (yellow card) 72'; Thayllon (yellow card) 89'	Stadium: Baenão; Attendance: 9,514; Referee: Rafael Martins Diniz

1 May 2022 4	Confiança	1–2	Remo	Aracaju
19:00 UTC−3	Adauto (yellow card) 12'; Raphael (yellow card) 41'; Matheuzinho 43'; Raí (yellow card) 90+2'; Bruno Camilo (yellow card) 90+5'	Report	Brenner 8'; Leonan (yellow card) 18'; Renan Castro (yellow card) 58'; Albano 65'; Paulinho Curuá (yellow card) 81', (red card) 82'	Stadium: Batistão; Attendance: 3,332; Referee: José Ricardo Vasconcellos Laranjeira

7 May 2022 5	Brasil de Pelotas	1–0	Remo	Pelotas
19:00 UTC−3	Karl 38', (yellow card) 70'; França (yellow card) 48'; Gabriel Araújo (yellow card) 65'; Luiz Meneses (yellow card) 88'	Report	Kevem (yellow card) 32'; Rodrigo Pimpão (yellow card) 55'; Albano (yellow card) 78'; Daniel Felipe (yellow card) 87'	Stadium: Estádio Bento Freitas; Attendance: 2,308; Referee: Dyorgines José Padovani de Andrade

15 May 2022 6	Remo	3–1	Mirassol	Belém
17:00 UTC−3	Erick Flores (yellow card) 8'; Rodrigo Pimpão (yellow card) 32'; Leonan 45+1'; Daniel Felipe 64', (yellow card) 64'; Bruno Alves (yellow card) 82'; Vanílson 90+4'	Report	Rodrigo Sam (yellow card) 15'; Cristian Renato (yellow card) 33'; Everton Bala 67'; Daniel (red card) 74'; Ivan (yellow card) 83'	Stadium: Baenão; Attendance: 6,333; Referee: Rodrigo Batista Raposo

23 May 2022 7	Ypiranga	2–1	Remo	Erechim
20:00 UTC−3	Hugo Almeida 39'; Marcão (yellow card) 40'; Kevem 43' (o.g.); Cesinha (yellow card) 78'; Jackson (yellow card) 84'	Report	Netto 15'; Leonan (yellow card) 34' (yellow-red card) 72'; Jean Patrick (yellow card) 78' (yellow-red card) 85'; Bruno Alves (yellow card) 90+3'	Stadium: Estádio Olímpico Colosso da Lagoa; Attendance: 583; Referee: Paulo Henrique de Melo Salmazio

29 May 2022 8	Remo	2–0	Floresta	Belém
19:00 UTC−3	Bruno Alves 58'; Marciel (yellow card) 60'; Brenner (yellow card) 61'; Fernandinho 90+2'	Report	Yago Rocha (yellow card) 8'; Perema (yellow card) 56'; Flávio Torres (yellow card) 78'; Carlinhos (yellow card) 79'	Stadium: Baenão; Attendance: 8,251; Referee: José Mendonça da Silva Júnior

6 June 2022 9	Remo	4–0	Campinense	Belém
20:00 UTC−3	Erick Flores (yellow card) 15', (goal) 34'; Brenner 30'; Daniel Felipe (yellow card) 31', (goal) 63'; Vanílson 68'; Fernandinho (yellow card) 89'	Report	Pedro Vitor (yellow card) 6'; Emerson (yellow card) 22'; Douglas Lima (yellow card) 74'	Stadium: Baenão; Attendance: 11,498; Referee: Arthur Gomes Rabelo

13 June 2022 10	Volta Redonda	3–0	Remo	Volta Redonda
20:00 UTC−3	Wendson (yellow card) 40'; Pedrinho 58'; Iran 80'; Lelê 90+3'	Report	Daniel Felipe (yellow card) 18' (yellow-red card) 37'	Stadium: Estádio Raulino de Oliveira; Attendance: 754; Referee: Douglas Schwengber da Silva

19 June 2022 11	Remo	1–2	Altos	Belém
19:00 UTC−3	Fernandinho 11'; Brenner (yellow card) 42'; Leonan (yellow card) 51'; Anderson Uchôa (yellow card) 60'; Rodrigo Pimpão (yellow card) 83'	Report	Valderrama (yellow card) 62'; Lucas Souza 90'; Ramon 90+4'; Dieguinho (yellow card) 90+4'; Diego Viana (yellow card) 90+5'	Stadium: Baenão; Attendance: 9,922; Referee: Diego da Costa Cidral

27 June 2022 12	Figueirense	0–0	Remo	Florianópolis
20:00 UTC−3		Report	Marciel (yellow card) 45+3'; Ricardo Luz (yellow card) 67'	Stadium: Estádio Orlando Scarpelli; Attendance: 5,962; Referee: Zandick Gondim Alves Júnior

3 July 2022 13	Remo	2–2	Paysandu	Belém
17:00 UTC−3	Fernandinho 44'; Bruno Alves (yellow card) 46'; Anderson Uchôa 54', (yellow card) 79'; Marlon (yellow card) 56'	Report	Leandro Silva (yellow card) 17'; José Aldo 44', (yellow card) 56'; Alessandro Vinícius (yellow card) 45+1'; Robinho 61'; Genílson (yellow card) 84'; Igor Carvalho (yellow card) 90'	Stadium: Baenão; Attendance: 13,197; Referee: Marcelo de Lima Henrique

10 July 2022 14	Atlético Cearense	3–1	Remo	Fortaleza
19:00 UTC−3	Caio Acaraú (yellow card) 41'; Guto (yellow card) 53'; Vanderlan 56'; Iury Tanque (yellow card) 76'; Wilker 88'; Vitinho 90'	Report	Igor Morais (yellow card) 3'; Rodrigo Pimpão (yellow card) 37'; Ricardo Luz (yellow card) 73'; Leandro Carvalho 83'; Daniel Felipe (yellow card) 87'; Brenner (yellow card) 90+2'	Stadium: Estádio Presidente Vargas; Attendance: 600; Referee: Paulo César Zanovelli da Silva

17 July 2022 15	Remo	2–0	ABC	Belém
19:00 UTC−3	Paulinho Curuá 8'; Brenner (yellow card) 54', (goal) 64' (pen.); Marlon (yellow card) 90+1'; Anderson Uchôa (yellow card) 90+3'	Report	Ícaro (yellow card) 31'; Eduardo (yellow card) 47'; Alan Uchôa (yellow card) 52'; Fábio Lima (yellow card) 72'; Walfrido (yellow card) 75'	Stadium: Baenão; Attendance: 8,449; Referee: Paulo Henrique de Melo Salmazio

24 July 2022 16	Botafogo-PB	0–0	Remo	João Pessoa
19:00 UTC−3	Leandro Camilo (yellow card) 24'; Esquerdinha (yellow card) 26'; Paulo Vitor (yellow card) 30'; Gustavo Coutinho (yellow card) 51'	Report	Leandro Carvalho (yellow card) 44'; Paulinho Curuá (yellow card) 61'; Celsinho (yellow card) 80'	Stadium: Almeidão; Attendance: 6,249; Referee: Lucas Paulo Torezin

1 August 2022 17	Remo	2–1	Ferroviário	Belém
20:00 UTC−3	Marco Antônio 45+2'; Leandro Carvalho (yellow card) 63'; Marlon (yellow card) 65'; Bruno Alves (yellow card) 66'; Anderson Uchôa (yellow card) 76'; Vanílson 90+4'; Daniel Felipe (yellow card) 90+7'	Report	Edson Cariús (yellow card) 4'; Natan (yellow card) 33'; Mateus Pivô (yellow card) 35'; Emerson (yellow card) 66'; Ian 80'	Stadium: Baenão; Attendance: 12,665; Referee: Vinícius Gomes do Amaral

7 August 2022 18	Remo	0–0	Aparecidense	Belém
17:00 UTC−3	Bruno Alves (yellow card) 54'; Pablo Roberto (yellow card) 83'	Report	Felipe Menezes (yellow card) 37'; Alex Henrique (yellow card) 90+1'	Stadium: Baenão; Attendance: 12,601; Referee: José Mendonça da Silva Júnior

13 August 2022 19	Botafogo-SP	2–1	Remo	Ribeirão Preto
17:00 UTC−3	Bruno Michel 43'; Jean Victor 51'; Deivity (yellow card) 79'	Report	Anderson Uchôa (yellow card) 8'; Daniel Felipe 71'	Stadium: Estádio Santa Cruz; Attendance: 3,280; Referee: Maguielson Lima Barbosa

=== Campeonato Paraense ===
Win Draw Loss

==== Group stage ====
Pos	Team	Pld	W	D	L	GF	GA	GD	Pts	Qualification or relegation
1	Remo (A)	8	3	5	0	9	4	+5	14	Advance to the Final stage
2	Castanhal (A)	8	4	1	3	10	5	+5	13	Advance to the Final stage
3	Caeté (A)	8	4	1	3	8	9	−1	13	Advance to the Final stage
4	Independente	8	3	2	3	9	8	+1	11	

Source: Globo Esporte
(A) Advance to a further round

===== Matches =====
27 January 2022 1	Remo	1–0	Amazônia Independente	Belém
21:30 UTC−3	Brenner 19'; Marlon (yellow card) 73'; Ronald (yellow card) 88'	Report	Paulo Pontes (yellow card) 25'; Dudu (yellow card) 90+3'	Stadium: Baenão; Attendance: 4,027; Referee: Elaine da Silva Melo

30 January 2022 2	Paragominas	0–0	Remo	Paragominas
16:00 UTC−3	Janilson (yellow card) 28'; Ted Love (yellow card) 45'; Índio (yellow card) 57'; Daniel (yellow card) 73'; Tallyson (yellow card) 90+4'	Report	Anderson Uchôa (yellow card) 24'; Daniel Felipe (yellow card) 36'; Marlon (yellow card) 55'; Paulo Henrique (yellow card) 58'	Stadium: Estádio Arena do Município Verde; Attendance: 295; Referee: Andrey da Silva e Silva

6 February 2022 3	Itupiranga	0–3	Remo	Parauapebas
16:00 UTC−3	Sousa (yellow card) 55'; Max Sandro (yellow card) 67'; Ivanilso (yellow card) 72'	Report	Ricardo Luz (yellow card) 4'; Erick Flores 21'; Marlon (yellow card) 53'; Felipe Gedoz 61', (yellow card) 81'; Bruno Alves 88'	Stadium: Rosenão; Attendance: 492; Referee: Marco José Soares de Almeida

10 February 2022 4	Remo	2–1	Tapajós	Belém
20:00 UTC−3	Brenner 21' (pen.), (yellow card) 43'; Ricardo Luz (yellow card) 33'; Erick Flores 45'; Pingo (yellow card) 48'; Paulo Henrique (yellow card) 58'	Report	Thárcio 2', (yellow card) 45+7'; Jackinha (yellow card) 25'; Otávio (yellow card) 43'; Fernando Portel (yellow card) 74'	Stadium: Baenão; Attendance: 3,147; Referee: Olivaldo José Alves Moraes

13 February 2022 5	Remo	0–0	Tuna Luso	Belém
18:00 UTC−3	Brenner (yellow card) 64'; Ricardo Luz (yellow card) 85'	Report	Lucão (yellow card) 18'; Edinaldo (yellow card) 28'; Kauê (yellow card) 46'; Fidélis (yellow card) 87'	Stadium: Baenão; Attendance: 6,445; Referee: Gustavo Ramos Melo

16 February 2022 6	Bragantino	1–1	Remo	Bragança
15:30 UTC−3	Arian Taperaçú (yellow card) 49'; Emerson Bacas 52' (pen.); Manoel (yellow card) 52'; Werley Capanema (yellow card) 67'; Hatos (yellow card) 83'; Léo Caeté (yellow card) 90+3'	Report	Bruno Alves 60' (pen.); Anderson Uchôa (yellow card) 67'; Leonan (yellow card) 79'; Daniel Felipe (yellow card) 86'	Stadium: Diogão; Attendance: 1,082; Referee: Joelson Silva dos Santos

20 February 2022 7	Paysandu	1–1	Remo	Belém
17:00 UTC−3	Marcão (yellow card) 9'; José Aldo (yellow card) 83'; Dioguinho 90+3'; Victor Diniz (red card) 90+4'; Kerve (red card) 90+4'; Mikael (yellow card) 90+6'	Report	Bruno Alves (yellow card) 9'; Pingo (yellow card) 83'; Brenner 88'	Stadium: Estádio da Curuzu; Attendance: 15,180; Referee: Marco José Soares de Almeida

6 March 2022 8	Remo	1–1	Águia de Marabá	Belém
15:30 UTC−3	Bruno Alves 19'; Marciel (yellow card) 70'	Report	Da Silva (yellow card) 45'; Corujinha (yellow card) 54'; Werick 71'; Betinho (yellow card) 84' (yellow-red card) 90+4'; Gustavo Henrique (yellow card) 90+1'; Levy (yellow card) 90+3'	Stadium: Baenão; Attendance: 8,644; Referee: Nadílson Sousa dos Santos
Note: The match, originally scheduled for 26 February 2022, was postponed due to a problem in Amazônia Independente v Itupiranga match, as all matches in the last round would be at the same time.

==== Final stage ====
===== Quarter-finals =====
19 March 2022 First leg	Caeté	1–1	Remo	Bragança
15:30 UTC−3	Paulinho 23'	Report	Erick Flores (yellow card) 39'; Bruno Alves 68' (pen.); Rony (yellow card) 69'; Anderson Uchôa (yellow card) 90'	Stadium: Diogão; Attendance: 1,047; Referee: Marco José Soares de Almeida
Note: The match, originally scheduled for 10 March 2022, was postponed due to the temporary suspension of the championship after Paragominas filed a complaint of irregular players.

22 March 2022 Second leg	Remo	4–0 (5–1 agg.)	Caeté	Belém
20:00 UTC−3	Brenner (yellow card) 13', (goal) 18'; Erick Flores 24'; Bruno Alves 35', 57'; Tiago Mafra (yellow card) 90+1'	Report	Júnior Araújo (yellow card) 13'; Iuri (yellow card) 88'	Stadium: Baenão; Attendance: 5,689; Referee: Gustavo Ramos Melo
Note: The match, originally scheduled for 14 March 2022, was postponed due to the temporary suspension of the championship after Paragominas filed a complaint of irregular players.

===== Semi-finals =====
26 March 2022 First leg	Tuna Luso	1–2	Remo	Belém
15:30 UTC−3	Fidélis (yellow card) 14'; Lucão (yellow card) 39'; Paulo Rangel 46'; Dutra (yellow card) 67'; Alexandre (yellow card) 86'	Report	Ricardo Luz (yellow card) 15'; Bruno Alves (yellow card) 39'; Erick Flores 45+3'; Anderson Uchôa 77'	Stadium: Estádio Francisco Vasques; Attendance: 788; Referee: Andrey da Silva e Silva

29 March 2022 Second leg	Remo	0–1 (2–2 agg.) (4–2 p)	Tuna Luso	Belém
20:00 UTC−3	Marlon (yellow card) 7'; Ronald (yellow card) 47'; Anderson Uchôa (yellow card) 67'; Paulinho Curuá (yellow card) 90+2'	Report	Fidélis (yellow card) 21'; Romário (yellow card) 25'; Léo Rosa (yellow card) 45+3'; Paulo Rangel (yellow card) 45+3', (goal) 76'; Lucão (yellow card) 60'; Kauê (yellow card) 68'	Stadium: Baenão; Attendance: 9,871; Referee: Djonaltan Costa de Araújo
	Penalties
	Brenner (penalty scored); Bruno Alves (penalty scored); Marlon (penalty scored); Paulinho Curuá (penalty scored)		(penalty missed) Kauê; (penalty scored) Michel; (penalty scored) Luan; (penalty missed) Jayme

===== Finals =====
3 April 2022 First leg	Remo	3–0	Paysandu	Belém
18:00 UTC−3	Brenner 11', 61', (yellow card) 41'; Anderson Uchôa (yellow card) 25', (goal) 85'; Daniel Felipe (yellow card) 37'; Marco Antônio (yellow card) 59'; Henrique (yellow card) 90+7'	Report	Serginho (yellow card) 34'; Robinho (yellow card) 45'; João Paulo (yellow card) 74'	Stadium: Baenão; Attendance: 13,192; Referee: Wagner do Nascimento Magalhães

6 April 2022 Second leg	Paysandu	3–1 (3–4 agg.)	Remo	Belém
20:00 UTC−3	Ricardinho 9'; José Aldo (yellow card) 19', (goal) 23'; Marcelo Toscano 38'; Genílson (yellow card) 49'; Marcão (red card) 67'	Report	Leonan 59'; Bruno Alves (yellow card) 69'; Ricardo Luz (yellow card) 81'	Stadium: Estádio da Curuzu; Attendance: 15,612; Referee: Raphael Claus

=== Copa do Brasil ===
Win Draw Loss

==== Third round ====
19 April 2022 First leg	Remo	2–1	Cruzeiro	Belém
21:30 UTC−3	Paulinho Curuá (yellow card) 63'; Willian Oliveira 70' (o.g.); Daniel Felipe 77'; Anderson Uchôa (yellow card) 80'; Renan Castro (yellow card) 89'	Report	Miticov (yellow card) 36'; João Paulo (yellow card) 50'; Willian Oliveira (yellow card) 57'; Rodolfo 65'; Zé Ivaldo (yellow card) 69'	Stadium: Baenão; Attendance: 12,577; Referee: Marcelo de Lima Henrique

12 May 2022 Second leg	Cruzeiro	1–0 (2–2 agg.) (5–4 p)	Remo	Belo Horizonte
19:30 UTC−3	Edu 75'	Report	Brenner (yellow card) 63'; Marciel (yellow card) 68'	Stadium: Arena Independência; Attendance: 22,158; Referee: Raphael Claus
	Penalties
	Edu (penalty missed); Eduardo Brock (penalty scored); Rodolfo (penalty scored); Daniel Júnior (penalty scored); Rafael Silva (penalty missed); Zé Ivaldo (penalty missed); Oliveira (penalty scored); Rafael Santos (penalty scored)		(penalty missed) Marlon; (penalty scored) Bruno Alves; (penalty scored) Vanílson; (penalty missed) Leonan; (penalty scored) Paulinho Curuá; (penalty missed) Laílson; (penalty scored) Anderson Uchôa; (penalty missed) Everton Sena
