= 2022 Campeonato Paraense finals =

- Event: 2022 Campeonato Paraense
Remo	Paysandu
4	3
- on aggregate

First leg
Remo	Paysandu
3	0
- Date: 3 April 2022
- Venue: Baenão, Belém
- Referee: Wagner do Nascimento Magalhães
- Attendance: 13,192

Second leg
Paysandu	Remo
3	1
- Date: 6 April 2022
- Venue: Estádio da Curuzu, Belém
- Referee: Raphael Claus
- Attendance: 15,612

The 2022 Campeonato Paraense finals was the final that decided the 2022 Campeonato Paraense, the 110th season of the Campeonato Paraense. The final were contested between Remo and Paysandu.

Remo defeated Paysandu 4–3 on aggregate to win their 47th Campeonato Paraense title.

== Road to the final ==
Note: In all scores below, the score of the home team is given first.

Remo			Round	Paysandu		
Opponent	Venue	Score		Opponent	Venue	Score
Group C			Group stage	Group A		
Pos / Team / Pld / Pts; 1 / Remo (A) / 8 / 14; 2 / Castanhal (A) / 8 / 13; 3 / Caeté (A) / 8 / 13; 4 / Independente / 8 / 11; Source: Globo Esporte (A) Advance to a further round			Group stage	Pos / Team / Pld / Pts; 1 / Paysandu (A) / 8 / 17; 2 / Águia de Marabá (A) / 8 / 12; 3 / Paragominas (R) / 8 / 7; 4 / Amazônia Independente (R) / 8 / 5; Source: Globo Esporte (A) Advance to a further round; (R) Relegated		
Caeté (won 5–1 on aggregate)	Away	1–1	Quarter-finals	Tapajós (won 5–3 on aggregate)	Away	3–4
Caeté (won 5–1 on aggregate)	Home	4–0	Quarter-finals	Tapajós (won 5–3 on aggregate)	Home	1–0
Tuna Luso (tied 2–2 on aggregate, won 4–2 on penalties)	Away	1–2	Semi-finals	Águia de Marabá (won 5–1 on aggregate)	Away	1–3
Tuna Luso (tied 2–2 on aggregate, won 4–2 on penalties)	Home	0–1	Semi-finals	Águia de Marabá (won 5–1 on aggregate)	Home	2–0

== Format ==
The finals were played on a home-and-away two-legged basis. If tied on aggregate, the penalty shoot-out was used to determine the winner.

== Matches ==
=== First leg ===
3 April 2022
18:00 UTC−3

Remo	3–0	Paysandu
Brenner 11', 61'; Anderson Uchôa 85'	Report

Baenão, Belém
Attendance: 13,192
Referee: Wagner do Nascimento Magalhães

Remo	Paysandu

GK	1	(Brazil) Vinícius
DF	2	(Brazil) Ricardo Luz
DF	3	(Brazil) Daniel Felipe		(yellow card) 37'
DF	4	(Brazil) Marlon (c)
DF	6	(Brazil) Leonan
MF	5	(Brazil) Anderson Uchôa	(yellow card) 25'	(substituted off) 90+5'
MF	16	(Brazil) Paulinho Curuá
MF	10	(Brazil) Marco Antônio	(yellow card) 59'	(substituted off) 81'
MF	11	(Brazil) Ronald		(substituted off) 81'
FW	7	(Brazil) Bruno Alves		(substituted off) 90+5'
FW	9	(Brazil) Brenner	(yellow card) 41'	(substituted off) 89'
Substitutes:
GK	12	(Brazil) Yago Darub
DF	13	(Brazil) Rony
DF	14	(Brazil) Davi
DF	19	(Brazil) Paulo Henrique
DF	23	(Brazil) Kevem
MF	8	(Brazil) Pingo		(substituted in) 81'
MF	15	(Brazil) Laílson		(substituted in) 81'
MF	17	(Brazil) Tiago Miranda
MF	18	(Brazil) Henrique	(yellow card) 90+7'	(substituted in) 90+5'
MF	21	(Brazil) Marciel		(substituted in) 90+5'
FW	20	(Brazil) Raul		(substituted in) 89'
FW	22	(Brazil) Tiago Mafra
Coach:
(Brazil) Paulo Bonamigo

GK	12	(Brazil) Elias
DF	2	(Brazil) Polegar		(substituted off) 61'
DF	30	(Brazil) Genílson
DF	14	(Brazil) Héverton
DF	6	(Brazil) João Paulo		(yellow card) 74'
MF	29	(Brazil) Mikael
MF	8	(Brazil) Ricardinho (c)		(substituted off) 30'
MF	11	(Brazil) José Aldo
MF	37	(Brazil) Serginho		(yellow card) 34'
FW	10	(Brazil) Marlon		(substituted off) 72'
FW	19	(Brazil) Henan		(substituted off) 61'
Substitutes:
GK	1	(Brazil) Thiago Coelho
DF	4	(Brazil) Marcão
DF	17	(Brazil) Igor Carvalho		(substituted in) 61'
DF	39	(Brazil) Patrick Brey
MF	5	(Brazil) Dênis Pedra
MF	13	(Brazil) Eric
MF	15	(Brazil) Christian
MF	22	(Brazil) Yure
FW	18	(Brazil) Alex Silva
FW	25	(Brazil) Robinho	(yellow card) 45'	(substituted in) 30'
FW	38	(Brazil) Dioguinho		(substituted in) 72'
FW	40	(Brazil) Marcelo Toscano		(substituted in) 61'
Coach:
(Brazil) Márcio Fernandes

Assistant referees:
Rodrigo Figueiredo Henrique Corrêa (Rio de Janeiro)
Fabrício Vilarinho da Silva (Goiás)
Fourth official:
Marco José Soares de Almeida (Pará)
Fifth official:
Acácio Menezes Leão (Pará)

=== Second leg ===
6 April 2022
20:00 UTC−3

Paysandu	3–1	Remo
Ricardinho 9'; José Aldo 23'; Marcelo Toscano 38'	Report	Leonan 59'

Estádio da Curuzu, Belém
Attendance: 15,612
Referee: Raphael Claus

Paysandu	Remo

GK	1	(Brazil) Thiago Coelho
DF	17	(Brazil) Igor Carvalho		(substituted off) 75'
DF	30	(Brazil) Genílson		(yellow card) 49'
DF	4	(Brazil) Marcão		(red card) 67'
DF	39	(Brazil) Patrick Brey
MF	29	(Brazil) Mikael
MF	8	(Brazil) Ricardinho (c)		(substituted off) 20'
MF	11	(Brazil) José Aldo	(yellow card) 19'	(substituted off) 86'
FW	37	(Brazil) Serginho		(substituted off) 75'
FW	10	(Brazil) Marlon		(substituted off) 46'
FW	40	(Brazil) Marcelo Toscano
Substitutes:
GK	12	(Brazil) Elias
GK	27	(Brazil) Gabriel Bernard
DF	2	(Brazil) Polegar		(substituted in) 75'
DF	14	(Brazil) Héverton
DF	31	(Brazil) Lucas Marreiros
MF	5	(Brazil) Dênis Pedra
MF	15	(Brazil) Christian
MF	22	(Brazil) Yure		(substituted in) 75'
FW	18	(Brazil) Alex Silva
FW	25	(Brazil) Robinho		(substituted in) 46'
FW	38	(Brazil) Dioguinho		(substituted in) 20'
FW	19	(Brazil) Henan		(substituted in) 86'
Coach:
(Brazil) Márcio Fernandes

GK	1	(Brazil) Vinícius
DF	2	(Brazil) Ricardo Luz		(yellow card) 81'
DF	3	(Brazil) Daniel Felipe
DF	4	(Brazil) Marlon (c)
DF	6	(Brazil) Leonan
MF	5	(Brazil) Pingo		(substituted off) 46'
MF	16	(Brazil) Paulinho Curuá
MF	8	(Brazil) Marco Antônio		(substituted off) 80'
MF	11	(Brazil) Ronald		(substituted off) 46'
FW	7	(Brazil) Bruno Alves	(yellow card) 69'	(substituted off) 86'
FW	9	(Brazil) Brenner
Substitutes:
GK	12	(Brazil) Yago Darub
DF	13	(Brazil) Rony		(substituted in) 86'
DF	14	(Brazil) Davi
DF	19	(Brazil) Paulo Henrique
DF	23	(Brazil) Kevem
MF	10	(Brazil) Felipe Gedoz		(substituted in) 80'
MF	15	(Brazil) Laílson		(substituted in) 46'
MF	17	(Brazil) Tiago Miranda
MF	18	(Brazil) Henrique
MF	21	(Brazil) Marciel		(substituted in) 46'
FW	20	(Brazil) Raul
FW	22	(Brazil) Tiago Mafra
Coach:
(Brazil) Paulo Bonamigo

Assistant referees:
Kléber Lúcio Gil (Santa Catarina)
Neuza Inês Back (São Paulo)
Fourth official:
Alexandre Expedito Vieira da Silva Júnior (Pará)
Fifth official:
Nayara Lucena Soares (Pará)

== See also ==
- 2023 Copa Verde
- 2023 Copa do Brasil
