= Raulzinho =

Raulzinho is aPortuguese diminutive of the name Raul. Raulzinho may refer to:

- Raulzinho (musician) (1934-2021), born Raul de Souza, Brazilian trombonist
- Raulzinho (basketball) (born 1992), born Raul Togni Neto, Brazilian basketball player
- Raulzinho (footballer) (born 2000), born Raul di Orlando Barbosa Mendes, Brazilian footballer
