= Albano (footballer, born 1997) =

Brazilian footballer

Personal information
- Full name: Albano Sehn Neto
- Date of birth: 9 June 1997 (age 29)
- Place of birth: São Miguel do Oeste, Brazil
- Height: 1.78 m (5 ft 10 in)
- Position: Attacking midfielder

Team information
- Current team: Ferroviária
- Number: 10

Youth career
- 2015–2017: Vila Nova

Senior career*
Years	Team	Apps	(Gls)
2017–2018	Vila Nova	2	(0)
2017	→ Jataiense (loan)	4	(0)
2018	→ Formosa (loan)	12	(0)
2018	Trindade	1	(0)
2018	Aparecida	8	(2)
2019–2021	Aparecidense	40	(13)
2019	→ Votuporanguense (loan)	0	(0)
2019	→ Jataiense (loan)	7	(0)
2021–2023	Goiás	26	(0)
2022	→ Remo (loan)	6	(1)
2022	→ Paraná (loan)	3	(0)
2023	→ Retrô (loan)	22	(2)
2024–2025	Inter de Limeira	40	(4)
2025	→ Ferroviária (loan)	29	(1)
2026–	Ferroviária	45	(4)
- * Club domestic league appearances and goals as of 9 November 2026

Albano Sehn Neto (born 9 June 1997), simply known as Albano, is a Brazilian footballer who plays as an attacking midfielder for Ferroviária.

== Club career ==
=== Early career ===
Born in São Miguel do Oeste, Santa Catarina, Albano was a Vila Nova youth graduate. After appearing with the first team in a friendly in 2015, he made his senior debut on 9 February 2017, coming on as a second-half substitute in a 2–1 Campeonato Goiano away win over Aparecidense.

On 1 August 2017, after featuring rarely, Albano was loaned to Jataiense. He started the 2018 season on loan at Formosa, before moving to Trindade in July.

After just one match for Trindade, Albano joined Aparecida in September 2018, helping in the club's promotion from the Campeonato Goiano Terceira Divisão.

=== Aparecidense ===
In December 2018, Albano signed for Aparecidense, but featured in only three matches before serving loans at Votuporanguense and Jataiense during the remainder of the 2019 campaign. With the latter, he featured regularly as they missed out promotion from the Campeonato Goiano Segunda Divisão.

Back to Aparecidense for the 2020 season, Albano was a regular starter and scored eight goals in the 2020 Série D, which included two hat-tricks, against União Rondonópolis (4–2 away win) and São Luiz (4–0 away win).

=== Goiás ===
On 20 May 2021, Albano signed a three-year contract with Goiás. He helped the club to achieve promotion from the Série B after appearing in 16 matches (only two starts, however).

Despite featuring regularly during the 2022 Campeonato Goiano, Albano was loaned to Remo in the Série C on 25 May of that year. Rarely used, he rescinded his link in July to move to Paraná also in a temporary deal.

On 28 December 2022, after being deemed surplus to requirements by the Esmeraldino, Albano was loaned to Retrô for one year.

=== Inter de Limeira ===
On 13 October 2023, Albano agreed to join Inter de Limeira for the upcoming season. A regular starter, he helped the club to reach the quarterfinals of the 2024 Campeonato Paulista and the 2024 Série D.

=== Ferroviária ===
After suffering relegation in the 2025 Campeonato Paulista, Albano was loaned to Ferroviária on 21 March of that year. Despite also suffering relegation, he signed a permanent two-year contract with the club on 17 December.

== Career statistics ==
As of 9 November 2026

Club	Season	League			State League		Cup		Continental		Other		Total	
Club	Season	Division	Apps	Goals	Apps	Goals	Apps	Goals	Apps	Goals	Apps	Goals	Apps	Goals
Vila Nova	2017	Série B	0	0	2	0	0	0	—		—		2	0
Jataiense (loan)	2017	Goiano 2ª Divisão	—		4	0	—		—		—		4	0
Formosa (loan)	2018	Brasiliense	—		12	0	—		—		—		12	0
Trindade	2018	Goiano 2ª Divisão	—		1	0	—		—		—		1	0
Aparecida	2018	Goiano 3ª Divisão	—		8	2	—		—		—		8	2
Aparecidense	2019	Série D	1	0	2	0	0	0	—		—		3	0
Aparecidense	2020	Série D	17	8	10	4	—		—		2 (Note: Appearance(s) in Copa Verde)	0	29	12
Aparecidense	2021	Série D	0	0	12	1	—		—		—		12	1
Aparecidense	Total		18	8	24	5	0	0	—		2	0	44	13
Votuporanguense (loan)	2019	Paulista A2	—		0	0	—		—		6 (Note: Appearance(s) in Copa Paulista)	0	6	0
Jataiense (loan)	2019	Goiano 2ª Divisão	—		7	0	—		—		—		7	0
Goiás	2021	Série B	16	0	—		—		—		—		16	0
Goiás	2022	Série A	0	0	10	0	0	0	—		—		10	0
Goiás	Total		16	0	10	0	0	0	—		—		26	0
Remo (loan)	2022	Série C	6	1	—		1	0	—		—		7	1
Paraná (loan)	2022	Série D	3	0	—		—		—		—		3	0
Retrô (loan)	2023	Série D	11	1	11	1	2	0	—		0	0	24	2
Inter de Limeira	2024	Série D	19	1	9	1	—		—		—		28	2
Inter de Limeira	2025	Série D	—		12	2	1	0	—		—		13	2
Inter de Limeira	Total		19	1	21	3	1	0	—		—		41	4
Ferroviária	2025	Série B	29	1	—		—		—		—		29	1
Ferroviária	2026	Série C	22	1	23	3	—		—		—		45	4
Ferroviária	Total		51	2	23	3	—		—		—		74	5
Career total			124	13	123	14	3	0	0	0	8	0	248	27
