= Renan Castro =

Brazilian footballer

Personal information
- Full name: Renan Santos de Castro
- Date of birth: 8 September 1995 (age 31)
- Place of birth: Rio de Janeiro, Brazil
- Height: 1.75 m (5 ft 9 in)
- Position: Left-back

Team information
- Current team: Paysandu (loan)

Youth career
- Fluminense
- 2011–2012: Vasco da Gama
- 2014–2016: Ituano

Senior career*
Years	Team	Apps	(Gls)
2016–2017	Ituano	2	(0)
2017	Guarani de Palhoça	15	(2)
2018	Ipatinga	6	(0)
2018	Marcílio Dias	2	(0)
2018	Pedras Rubras	5	(0)
2019	Goiânia	6	(0)
2019	Mirassol	0	(0)
2020	Anapolina	4	(0)
2020	Atibaia	3	(0)
2020–2022	Joinville	46	(0)
2022	Remo	11	(0)
2023–2024	Amazonas	53	(1)
2025	Água Santa	21	(0)
2025–	Guarani	15	(0)
2026–	→ Paysandu (loan)	4	(0)
- * Club domestic league appearances and goals as of 9 November 2026

Renan Santos de Castro (born 8 September 1995) is a Brazilian footballer who plays as a left-back for Paysandu, on loan from Guarani.

== Career ==
Born in Rio de Janeiro, Castro began his career with Ituano, making his senior debut in the 2016 Copa Paulista. After leaving the club in 2017, he subsequently played for Guarani de Palhoça, Ipatinga and Marcílio Dias before moving abroad with Portuguese Campeonato de Portugal side Pedras Rubras in 2018.

On 3 January 2019, Castro returned to his home country after signing for Goiânia. He was presented at Mirassol on 24 June, before moving to Anapolina the following 13 January.

On 17 September 2020, after a short stint at Atibaia, Castro was announced at Joinville. He was a regular starter for the side during his spell, before moving to Remo on 5 April 2022.

Castro left Remo on 30 August 2022, before signing for fellow Série C side Amazonas on 24 December. On 20 December 2023, after helping in the club's first-ever promotion to the Série B, he renewed his link for a further year.

Castro left Amazonas on 28 December 2024, as his contract was due to expire, and joined Água Santa the following day.

== Career statistics ==
As of 13 February 2025

Club	Season	League			State League		Cup		Continental		Other		Total	
Club	Season	Division	Apps	Goals	Apps	Goals	Apps	Goals	Apps	Goals	Apps	Goals	Apps	Goals
Ituano	2016	Série D	0	0	0	0	—		—		12 (Note: Appearance(s) in Copa Paulista)	1	12	1
Ituano	2017	Série D	0	0	2	0	—		—		—		2	0
Ituano	Subtotal		0	0	2	0	—		—		12	1	14	1
Guarani de Palhoça	2017	Catarinense Série B	—		15	2	—		—		—		15	2
Ipatinga	2018	Mineiro Módulo II	—		6	0	—		—		—		6	0
Marcílio Dias	2018	Catarinense Série B	—		2	0	—		—		—		2	0
Pedras Rubras	2018–19	Campeonato de Portugal	5	0	—		—		—		—		5	0
Goiânia	2019	Goiano	—		6	0	—		—		—		6	0
Mirassol	2019	Paulista	—		—		—		—		6	0	6	0
Anapolina	2020	Goiano	—		4	0	—		—		—		4	0
Atibaia	2020	Paulista A2	—		3	0	—		—		—		3	0
Joinville	2020	Série D	12	0	—		—		—		8 (Note: Appearance(s) in Copa Santa Catarina)	1	20	1
Joinville	2021	Série D	15	0	8	0	1	0	—		5 (Note: One appearance and one goal in Recopa Catarinense, four appearances in Copa Santa Catarina)	1	29	1
Joinville	2022	Catarinense	—		11	0	—		—		—		11	0
Joinville	Subtotal		27	0	19	0	1	0	—		13	2	60	2
Remo	2022	Série C	11	0	—		1	0	—		—		12	0
Amazonas	2023	Série C	20	0	9	1	—		—		—		29	1
Amazonas	2024	Série B	16	0	8	0	3	0	—		3 (Note: Appearance(s) in Copa Verde)	0	30	0
Amazonas	Subtotal		36	0	17	1	3	0	—		3	0	59	1
Água Santa	2025	Série D	0	0	8	0	—		—		—		8	0
Career total			79	0	82	3	4	0	0	0	34	3	199	6

== Honours ==
Joinville

- Copa Santa Catarina: 2020
- Recopa Catarinense: 2021

Amazonas

- Campeonato Amazonense: 2023
- Campeonato Brasileiro Série C: 2023
