= Emerson Carvalho =

Brazilian footballer (born 1993)

Personal information
- Full name: Emerson Carvalho de Oliveira
- Date of birth: 16 June 1993 (age 33)
- Place of birth: Magé, Brazil
- Height: 1.68 m (5 ft 6 in)
- Position: Midfielder

Team information
- Current team: São Raimundo-RR

Youth career
- 2008–2010: CF Rio de Janeiro
- 2010: Fluminense

Senior career*
Years	Team	Apps	(Gls)
2012–2013	Widzew Łódź	1	(0)
2016	Tocantins	14	(1)
2017	Tocantins	6	(2)
2018	São Raimundo-RR	8	(0)
2018	Barcelona-RJ	7	(0)
2019	União Beltrão	13	(1)
2020	São Raimundo-RR	13	(2)
2021	Treze	5	(0)
2021	Olaria	13	(0)
2022	Campinense	27	(0)
2023	Capital	8	(0)
2023	Olaria	14	(2)
2024	Serra Branca	9	(1)
2024–	São Raimundo-RR	14	(0)
- * Club domestic league appearances and goals as of 21:25, 16 June 2024 (UTC)

Emerson Carvalho de Oliveira (born 16 June 1993), known as Emerson Carvalho, is a Brazilian professional footballer who plays as a midfielder for São Raimundo-RR.
