= Héverton (footballer, born 1988) =

Brazilian footballer

Personal information
- Full name: Héverton Cardoso da Silva
- Date of birth: January 14, 1988 (age 38)
- Place of birth: São Paulo, Brazil
- Height: 1.88 m (6 ft 2 in)
- Position: Centre-back

Team information
- Current team: Pelotas

Youth career
- 2006–2007: Pão de Açúcar
- 2007: → Grêmio (loan)

Senior career*
Years	Team	Apps	(Gls)
2008–2009	Grêmio	7	(1)
2009	→ América de Natal (loan)	2	(0)
2010–2013	Pão de Açúcar	1	(1)
2010	→ Guarani (loan)	3	(0)
2011	→ Fortaleza (loan)	0	(0)
2013	Santa Cruz-RS	7	(0)
2013	Pelotas	0	(0)
2014	Macaé	0	(0)
2014–2016	Juventude	67	(4)
2016	Sampaio Corrêa	15	(1)
2017	Cuiabá	12	(0)
2018–2022	Brasil de Pelotas	89	(1)
2022	Paysandu SC	1	(0)
2023	Velo Clube	12	(0)
2023–	Pelotas		
- * Club domestic league appearances and goals as of 21 March 2023

Héverton Cardoso da Silva (born January 14, 1988), known as just Héverton, is a Brazilian footballer who plays as a centre-back for Pelotas.

== Career ==
Grêmio signed the defender on loan from Pão de Açúcar in 2007. Later, the deal become permanent and Héverton signed a contract until December 2009.

After a lot of injuries and suspensions in the first team defenders, Héverton was selected from the youth team to play the last matches of the Campeonato Brasileiro 2008.

On November 9, he made his first team debut in a 0-1 away victory against Palmeiras. In the following game, on November 16, he scored his first professional goal, the second in a 2-1 home win against Coritiba. On July 7, 2009, Héverton was loaned to Serie B side América de Natal.

He signed for Brasil de Pelotas in Campeonato Brasileiro Série B in 2018.

== Honours ==
Cuiabá

- Campeonato Mato-Grossense: 2017
