= Paulinho Curuá =

Brazilian footballer

Personal information
- Full name: Paulo Tadeu Viana Martins
- Date of birth: 11 May 1997 (age 29)
- Place of birth: Curuá, Brazil
- Height: 1.85 m (6 ft 1 in)
- Position: Defensive midfielder

Team information
- Current team: The Cong-Viettel
- Number: 14

Youth career
- São Francisco-PA
- Desportiva Paraense
- Remo
- 2016: São Raimundo-AM

Senior career*
Years	Team	Apps	(Gls)
2016–2018	Central	16	(1)
2018	→ Tapajós (loan)	8	(1)
2019–2023	Tapajós	27	(3)
2019	→ São Raimundo-PA (loan)	9	(0)
2019	→ Carajás (loan)	8	(0)
2020	→ Tuna Luso (loan)	9	(0)
2021–2023	→ Remo (loan)	48	(1)
2023–2025	Remo	31	(1)
2025	→ Grêmio Prudente (loan)	13	(0)
2025	Portuguesa	0	(0)
2025–	The Cong-Viettel	15	(0)
- * Club domestic league appearances and goals as of 7 June 2026

Paulo Tadeu Viana Martins (born 11 May 1997) commonly known as Paulinho Curuá, is a Brazilian professional footballer who plays as a defensive midfielder for V.League 1 club The Cong-Viettel.

== Career ==
Born in Curuá, Pará, Paulinho Curuá represented the youth sides of São Francisco-PA, Desportiva Paraense and Remo before joining the under-20 team of São Raimundo-AM in January 2016. On 26 May of that year, he moved to Série D side Central.

Paulinho Curuá made his senior debut on 15 January 2017, coming on as a second-half substitute and scoring Central's second in a 2–0 Campeonato Pernambucano home win over Belo Jardim. He was regularly used during the 2017 Pernambucano, but subsequently lost space, and moved on loan to Tapajós on 5 October 2018.

Paulinho Curuá helped Tapajós to win the 2018 Campeonato Paraense Second Division, scoring the winner in the first leg of the finals against rivals São Raimundo-PA, and renewed his link with the club on 24 December of that year. On 15 April 2019, he moved to São Raimundo also on loan.

In September 2019, Paulinho Curuá moved to Carajás on loan, and also helped the side to achieve promotion in the Paraense Second Division. On 22 October 2020, after playing the 2020 Paraense back at Boto, he was announced at Tuna Luso, where achieved promotion from the Paraense Second Division for the third consecutive time and won the title for the second time.

On 3 May 2021, after scoring three goals for Tapajós in the 2021 Paraense, Paulinho Curuá was loaned to Remo for the Série B season. He made his club debut on 26 June, replacing Kevem in a 1–1 away draw against Náutico, but failed to make any other league appearances as the club suffered relegation.

Paulinho Curuá started to feature more regularly in the following year, and scored his first goal for Remo on 18 July 2022, in a 2–0 win over ABC in the Série C; the goal was featured nationally on Rede Globo's Fantástico program. At the end of April 2023, his loan with Remo was not renewed, and he returned to his parent club Tapajós. On 4 July, however, he signed for a permanent deal for the Azulinos.

Despite being regularly used in the following years, Paulinho Curuá was loaned to Grêmio Prudente on 5 December 2024. On 26 March 2025, he signed a contract with Portuguesa until 2027, for a rumoured fee of R$ 100,000.

In July 2025, after failing to make an appearance for Lusa, Paulinho Curuá left the club after receiving an offer from a Vietnamese club. An 7 August 2025, V.League 1 side The Cong-Viettel announced the arrival of Paulinho Curuá to the team.

== Career statistics ==
As of 14 March 2026

Appearances and goals by club, season and competition
Club	Season	League			State league (Note: Includes Campeonato Pernambucano, Campeonato Paraense Second Division, Campeonato Paraense, Campeonato Paulista Série A2)		Cup (Note: Includes Copa do Brasil and Vietnamese National Cup)		Continental		Other		Total	
Club	Season	Division	Apps	Goals	Apps	Goals	Apps	Goals	Apps	Goals	Apps	Goals	Apps	Goals
Central	2016	Série D	0	0	—		—		—		—		0	0
Central	2017	Série D	1	0	12	1	—		—		—		13	1
Central	2018	Série D	1	0	2	0	—		—		—		3	0
Central	Total		2	0	14	1	—		—		—		16	1
Tapajós	2018	Paraense 2ª Divisão	—		8	1	—		—		—		8	1
Tapajós	2019	Paraense	—		9	0	—		—		—		9	0
Tapajós	2020	Paraense	—		10	0	—		—		—		10	0
Tapajós	2021	Paraense	—		8	3	—		—		—		8	3
Tapajós	Total		—		35	4	—		—		—		35	4
São Raimundo-PA (loan)	2019	Série D	9	0	—		—		—		—		9	0
Carajás (loan)	2019	Paraense 2ª Divisão	—		8	0	—		—		—		8	0
Tuna Luso (loan)	2020	Paraense 2ª Divisão	—		9	0	—		—		—		9	0
Remo	2021	Série B	1	0	—		0	0	—		6 (Note: Appearance(s) in Copa Verde)	0	7	0
Remo	2022	Paraense	11	1	10	0	2	0	—		0	0	23	1
Remo	2023	Paraense	6	0	9	0	4	0	—		5	0	24	0
Remo	2024	Paraense	18	1	6	0	0	0	—		2	0	26	1
Remo	Total		36	2	25	0	6	0	—		13	0	80	2
Grêmio Prudente (loan)	2025	Paulista A2	—		13	0	—		—		—		13	0
Portuguesa	2025	Série D	0	0	—		—		—		—		0	0
The Cong-Viettel	2025–26	V.League 1	6	0	—		0	0	—		—		6	0
Career total			53	2	104	5	6	0	0	0	13	0	176	7

== Honours ==
Tapajós

- Campeonato Paraense Second Division: 2018

Tuna Luso

- Campeonato Paraense Second Division: 2020

Remo

- Copa Verde: 2021
- Campeonato Paraense: 2022
