= Alexandre Villa =

Brazilian footballer

Personal information
- Full name: Antônio Alexandre Villa
- Date of birth: 13 June 1983 (age 43)
- Place of birth: Santa Rosa de Viterbo, Brazil
- Height: 1.91 m (6 ft 3 in)
- Position: Goalkeeper

Team information
- Current team: Inter de Santa Maria

Youth career
- 2001–2002: Comercial-SP

Senior career*
Years	Team	Apps	(Gls)
2003–2004	Comercial-SP	8	(0)
2004–2005	União São João	54	(0)
2005–2006	Comercial-SP	0	(0)
2007	Santa Cruz	6	(0)
2007	União São João	24	(0)
2008	América-SP	19	(0)
2008–2009	Noroeste	4	(0)
2009	Unirea Urziceni		
2010	Noroeste	3	(0)
2011	Sertãozinho	13	(0)
2011	Botafogo-SP	12	(0)
2012	Caxias	1	(0)
2012–2013	Cerâmica	23	(0)
2013	Sertãozinho	9	(0)
2014	Funorte	15	(0)
2015	Avenida	13	(0)
2015–2016	São Gabriel	2	(0)
2017	Avenida	4	(0)
2018	Passo Fundo	14	(0)
2019	Guarani (VA)	18	(0)
2019	Barra	2	(0)
2019	Caçador	10	(0)
2020–2022	São José-RS	4	(0)
2023	Barcelona-BA	9	(0)
2023–2024	Santa Cruz-RS	4	(0)
2024	Inter de Santa Maria	1	(0)
2025	Concórdia	7	(0)
2025–	Inter de Santa Maria		
- * Club domestic league appearances and goals as of 29 July 2025

Antônio Alexandre Villa (born 13 June 1983), better known as Alexandre Villa or Villa, is a Brazilian professional footballer who plays as a goalkeeper for Inter de Santa Maria.

== Career ==
Revealed by Comercial de Ribeirão Preto, Villa played his first years for the club, in addition to spells at União São João, Santa Cruz, América-SP and Noroeste. In 2009 he played for Romanian football, for FC Urinea Urziceni. From 2012, when he was hired by SER Caxias, he started to play for several clubs in Rio Grande do Sul.

In the 2019 season, Villa defended the Guarani de Venâncio Aires, Barra-SC and Caçador clubs, becoming champion of Série C of Santa Catarina. In 2020 he returned to Rio Grande do Sul football once time to play for São José.

After four seasons at EC São José, Villa arrived at Barcelona de Ilhéus to compete in the 2023 Campeonato Baiano. He later defended FC Santa Cruz as part of the Serie A2 champion squad, guaranteeing his stay for the 2024 season. He later played for Inter de Santa Maria, and in December 2024 he was announced as a reinforcement for Concórdia for the following year.

On 27 February 2025, Villa stood out in his performance in the penalty shoot-outs against Ponte Preta, in the first stage of the Copa do Brasil. Interviewed after the match, the goalkeeper confided that his own son was a Ponte Preta fan and asked him to miss the match. In April, Villa returned to Inter de Santa Maria.

== Honours ==
Caçador

- Campeonato Catarinense Série C: 2019

Santa Cruz-RS

- Campeonato Gaúcho Série A2: 2023
