= Anderson Paraíba (footballer, born 1991) =

Brazilian footballer

Personal information
- Full name: Anderson da Silva
- Date of birth: 25 January 1991 (age 35)
- Place of birth: João Pessoa, Brazil
- Height: 1.70 m (5 ft 7 in)
- Position: Midfielder

Youth career
- Sport Recife

Senior career*
| Years | Team | Apps | (Gls) |
| 2011–2012 | Sport Recife | 6 | (0) |
| 2012 | → Campinense (loan) | 1 | (0) |
| 2013 | CSP | 24 | (1) |
| 2014 | Salgueiro | 43 | (6) |
| 2015 | ABC | 4 | (1) |
| 2015 | CSA | 10 | (0) |
| 2015 | Salgueiro | 15 | (1) |
| 2016 | Novo Hamburgo | 14 | (1) |
| 2016 | Boa Esporte | 3 | (1) |
| 2017 | Kalloni | 9 | (0) |
| 2017 | Passo Fundo | 9 | (0) |
| 2018 | Operário Ferroviário | 7 | (1) |
| 2019 | São Luiz | 10 | (0) |
| 2019 | Concórdia | 8 | (0) |
| 2020 | Retrô | 5 | (1) |
| 2020 | América de Natal | 13 | (0) |
| 2021 | Retrô | 3 | (0) |
| 2021 | Manaus | 27 | (2) |
| 2022 | Botafogo-PB | 15 | (1) |
| 2022–2023 | Remo | 8 | (0) |
| 2023 | Jerash | | |
- * Club domestic league appearances and goals as of 28 May 2022

Anderson da Silva (born 25 January 1991), commonly known as Anderson Paraíba, is a Brazilian professional footballer who plays as a midfielder.
