= Celsinho (footballer, born March 1988) =

Brazilian footballer

Personal information
- Full name: Celsonil Santos de Macedo Júnior
- Date of birth: 15 March 1988 (age 38)
- Place of birth: São Bernardo do Campo, Brazil
- Height: 1.83 m (6 ft 0 in)
- Position: Right-back

Team information
- Current team: CSA

Youth career
- Pato Branco

Senior career*
Years	Team	Apps	(Gls)
2005	Pato Branco		
2006	Francisco Beltrão		
2007	Coritiba		
2008	Pato Branco		
2009	Lajeadense		
2010–2011	Juventude	7	(1)
2012–2013	Lajeadense	10	(0)
2012–2013	→ Bangu (loan)	9	(1)
2013	Ypiranga		
2014	Caldense	1	(0)
2015	Novo Hamburgo	0	(0)
2016	Cianorte	7	(1)
2016	Novo Hamburgo	6	(0)
2017–2019	CSA	51	(2)
2020	Novorizontino	9	(0)
2020–2021	Vila Nova	38	(0)
2021	CRB	16	(0)
2022	Inter de Limeira	10	(0)
2022	Remo	8	(0)
2023–	CSA	4	(0)
- * Club domestic league appearances and goals as of 16 July 2023

Celsonil Santos de Macedo Júnior (born 15 March 1988), commonly known as Celsinho is a Brazilian professional footballer who plays for CSA as a right-back.

== Career ==
Born in São Bernardo do Campo, Celsinho graduated from the youth academy of Pato Branco and made his senior debut in 2005. In the following years, he played for Francisco Beltrão, Coritiba, Lajeadense and signed for Juventude on 22 June 2010.

After spending the 2012 season on loan from Lajeadense at Bangu, Celsinho's loan deal was extended for the 2013 season in November 2012. Ahead of the 2014 season, he joined Caldense. In the following year, he signed for Novo Hamburgo. After playing for the side in Campeonato Gaúcho in early 2016, he switched to Cianorte of Campeonato Paranaense. However, he rejoined Novo Hamburgo on 7 June 2016.

On 22 December 2016, Celsinho moved to CSA. He played sparingly, with his side winning promotion to Série B. On 20 June 2018, he scored his first Série B goal in a 1–1 draw against Ponte Preta. He played regularly for the club, with his side winning the Campeonato Alagoano and achieving promotion to Série A, after finishing runners-up in Série B. On 10 December, he extended his contract for the upcoming season.
