= 2022 Campeonato Paraense =

Campeonato Paraense
- Season: 2022
- Champions: Remo
- Relegated: Paragominas; Amazônia Independente
- Série D: Tuna Luso; Águia de Marabá
- Copa Verde: Remo; Paysandu
- Copa do Brasil: Remo; Paysandu (via Copa Verde); Tuna Luso; Águia de Marabá
- Matches: 64
- Goals: 154 (2.41 per match)
- Top goalscorer: Paulo Rangel (9 goals)
- Biggest home win: Paysandu 4–0 Itupiranga (16 February 2022); Castanhal 4–0 Paysandu (6 March 2022); Remo 4–0 Caeté (22 March 2022); Tuna Luso 4–0 Bragantino (23 March 2022)
- Biggest away win: Tuna Luso 0–3 Paysandu (30 January 2022); Itupiranga 0–3 Remo (6 February 2022)
- Highest scoring: Tapajós 3–4 Paysandu (20 March 2022)
- Highest attendance: 15,612; Paysandu 3–1 Remo (6 April 2022)
- Lowest attendance: 46; Tuna Luso 3–2 Águia de Marabá (6 April 2022)

The 2022 Campeonato Paraense was the 110th edition of Pará's top professional football league. The competition started on 26 January and ended on 6 April. Remo won the championship for the 47th time.

== Format ==
The competition consisted of three groups with four clubs, with the teams of one group facing those of the other two. The top two in each group advanced to the final stage, along with the top two placed third. The matches of the quarter-finals, semi-finals, third place play-off and the finals will be played on a home-and-away two-legged basis.

The two worst teams in the overall standings will be relegated to the 2023 Campeonato Paraense Second Division.

The champion and the best placed team not qualified via CBF ranking qualify to the 2023 Copa Verde. The champion, the runner-up and the 3rd-placed team qualify to the 2023 Copa do Brasil. The best two teams who isn't on Campeonato Brasileiro Série A, Série B or Série C qualifies to 2023 Campeonato Brasileiro Série D.

== Participating teams ==
Club	Home city	Manager	2021 result
Águia de Marabá	Marabá	Wando Costa	8th
Amazônia Independente	Santarém	Matheus Lima	1st (On 2nd Division)
Bragantino	Bragança	Marquinhos Taíra	7th
Caeté	Bragança	Josué Teixeira	2nd (On 2nd Division)
Castanhal	Castanhal	Robson Melo	4th
Independente	Tucuruí	Léo Goiano	6th
Itupiranga	Itupiranga	Charles Guerreiro	5th
Paragominas	Paragominas	Samuel Cândido	9th
Paysandu	Belém	Márcio Fernandes	1st
Remo	Belém	Paulo Bonamigo	3rd
Tapajós	Santarém	Júnior Amorim	10th
Tuna Luso	Belém	Emerson Almeida	2nd

== Group stage ==
=== Group A ===
Pos	Team	Pld	W	D	L	GF	GA	GD	Pts	Qualification or relegation
1	Paysandu (A)	8	5	2	1	14	6	+8	17	Advance to the Final stage
2	Águia de Marabá (A)	8	3	3	2	10	9	+1	12	Advance to the Final stage
3	Paragominas (R)	8	1	4	3	8	10	−2	7	2023 Paraense 2nd Division
4	Amazônia Independente (R)	8	1	2	5	4	9	−5	5	2023 Paraense 2nd Division

Source: Globo Esporte
(A) Advance to a further round; (R) Relegated

=== Group B ===
Pos	Team	Pld	W	D	L	GF	GA	GD	Pts	Qualification or relegation
1	Tuna Luso (A)	8	3	2	3	8	10	−2	11	Advance to the Final stage
2	Bragantino (A)	8	3	1	4	11	13	−2	10	Advance to the Final stage
3	Tapajós (A)	8	2	3	3	6	7	−1	9	Advance to the Final stage
4	Itupiranga	7	2	1	4	9	16	−7	7	

Source: Globo Esporte
(A) Advance to a further round

=== Group C ===
Pos	Team	Pld	W	D	L	GF	GA	GD	Pts	Qualification or relegation
1	Remo (A)	8	3	5	0	9	4	+5	14	Advance to the Final stage
2	Castanhal (A)	8	4	1	3	10	5	+5	13	Advance to the Final stage
3	Caeté (A)	8	4	1	3	8	9	−1	13	Advance to the Final stage
4	Independente	8	3	2	3	9	8	+1	11	

Source: Globo Esporte
(A) Advance to a further round

== Final stage ==
=== Quarter-finals ===
20 March 2022
09:30 UTC –3

Tapajós	3–4	Paysandu
Bambelo 4', 50'; Otávio 58' (pen.)	Report	Genílson 1'; Danrlei 14'; Felipe Macena 41' (o.g.); Polegar 90+1'

Estádio Francisco Vasques, Belém
Attendance: 322
Referee: Joelson Nazareno Ferreira Cardoso
23 March 2022
20:00 UTC –3

Paysandu	1–0	Tapajós
Danrlei 48'	Report

Estádio da Curuzu, Belém
Attendance: 3,875
Referee: Dewson Fernando Freitas da Silva

Paysandu won 5–3 on aggregate and advanced to the semi-finals.

19 March 2022
17:00 UTC –3

Águia de Marabá	0–0	Castanhal
	Report

Estádio Municipal Zinho de Oliveira, Marabá
Attendance: 1,974
Referee: Gustavo Ramos Melo
22 March 2022
15:00 UTC –3

Castanhal	0–1	Águia de Marabá
	Report	Luan Parede 75'

Estádio Francisco Vasques, Belém
Attendance: 120
Referee: Marco José Soares de Almeida

Águia de Marabá won 1–0 on aggregate and advanced to the semi-finals.

20 March 2022
15:30 UTC –3

Bragantino	1–1	Tuna Luso
Lucão 36' (o.g.)	Report	Paulo Rangel 13' (pen.)

Diogão, Bragança
Attendance: 1,000
Referee: Olivaldo José Alves Moraes
23 March 2022
15:00 UTC –3

Tuna Luso	4–0	Bragantino
Paulo Rangel 4', 70', 76'; Fidélis 19'	Report

Estádio Francisco Vasques, Belém
Attendance: 152
Referee: Alexandre Expedito Vieira da Silva Júnior

Tuna Luso won 5–1 on aggregate and advanced to the semi-finals.

19 March 2022
15:30 UTC –3

Caeté	1–1	Remo
Paulinho 23'	Report	Bruno Alves 68' (pen.)

Diogão, Bragança
Attendance: 997
Referee: Marco José Soares de Almeida
22 March 2022
20:00 UTC –3

Remo	4–0	Caeté
Brenner 18'; Erick Flores 24'; Bruno Alves 35', 57'	Report

Baenão, Belém
Attendance: 5,689
Referee: Gustavo Ramos Melo

Remo won 5–1 on aggregate and advanced to the semi-finals.

=== Semi-finals ===
27 March 2022
17:00 UTC –3

Águia de Marabá	1–3	Paysandu
Luan Parede 51'	Report	Danrlei 25'; Serginho 45+3'; Polegar 79'

Estádio Municipal Zinho de Oliveira, Marabá
Attendance: 2,930
Referee: Marco José Soares de Almeida
30 March 2022
20:00 UTC –3

Paysandu	2–0	Águia de Marabá
Danrlei 17'; Henan 90+1'	Report

Estádio da Curuzu, Belém
Attendance: 5,779
Referee: Olivaldo José Alves Moraes

Paysandu won 5–1 on aggregate and advanced to the semi-finals.

26 March 2022
15:30 UTC –3

Tuna Luso	1–2	Remo
Paulo Rangel 46'	Report	Erick Flores 45+3'; Anderson Uchôa 77'

Estádio Francisco Vasques, Belém
Attendance: 388
Referee: Andrey da Silva e Silva
29 March 2022
20:00 UTC –3

Remo	0–1	Tuna Luso
	Report	Paulo Rangel 76'
Penalties
Brenner (penalty scored); Bruno Alves (penalty scored); Marlon (penalty scored); Paulinho Curuá (penalty scored)	4–2	(penalty missed) Kauê; (penalty scored) Michel; (penalty scored) Luan; (penalty missed) Jayme

Baenão, Belém
Attendance: 8,960
Referee: Djonaltan Costa de Araújo

Tied 2–2 on aggregate, Remo won on penalties and advanced to the finals.

=== Third place play-off ===
2 April 2022
16:30 UTC –3

Águia de Marabá	3–2	Tuna Luso
Luan Parede 54', 60'; Flamel 58'	Report	Paulo Rangel 69' (pen.); Lucão 76'

Estádio Municipal Zinho de Oliveira, Marabá
Attendance: 451
Referee: Ignácio José de Almeida Pedro
6 April 2022
09:30 UTC –3

Tuna Luso	3–2	Águia de Marabá
Kauê 20'; Jayme 70'; Pulga 80'	Report	Flamel 23'; Elivelton 28'
Penalties
Léo Rosa (penalty scored); Araújo (penalty scored); Pulga (penalty scored); Neto Ribeiro (penalty missed); Alexandre (penalty scored)	4–2	(penalty scored) Admilton; (penalty missed) Elivelton; (penalty scored) Da Silva; (penalty missed) Ramon

Estádio Francisco Vasques, Belém
Attendance: 18
Referee: Dewson Fernando Freitas da Silva

Tied 5–5 on aggregate, Tuna Luso won on penalties.

=== Finals ===
3 April 2022
18:00 UTC –3

Remo	3–0	Paysandu
Brenner 11', 61'; Anderson Uchôa 85'	Report

Baenão, Belém
Attendance: 12,156
Referee: Wagner do Nascimento Magalhães
6 April 2022
20:00 UTC –3

Paysandu	3–1	Remo
Ricardinho 9'; José Aldo 23'; Marcelo Toscano 38'	Report	Leonan 59'

Estádio da Curuzu, Belém
Attendance: 13,271
Referee: Raphael Claus

Remo won 4–3 on aggregate.
