= Daniel Felipe =

Brazilian footballer (born 1992)

Personal information
- Full name: Daniel Felipe Sá Nascimento
- Date of birth: January 31, 1992 (age 34)
- Place of birth: Vitória, Brazil
- Height: 1.87 m (6 ft 2 in)
- Position: Centre-back

Team information
- Current team: Volta Redonda

Youth career
- Madureira

Senior career*
Years	Team	Apps	(Gls)
2012–2016	Madureira	102	(7)
2015	→ Olaria (loan)	16	(1)
2016	Volta Redonda	13	(0)
2017	América de Natal	7	(0)
2017–2020	Volta Redonda	65	(5)
2020	Sampaio Corrêa	34	(1)
2021	Portuguesa-RJ	1	(0)
2021	Botafogo-PB	23	(1)
2022	Remo	23	(4)
2023–	Volta Redonda	7	(0)
- * Club domestic league appearances and goals as of 8 May 2023

Daniel Felipe Sá Nascimento (born 31 January 1992), or simply Daniel Felipe, is a Brazilian footballer who plays as a centre-back for Volta Redonda.

== Honours ==
Volta Redonda

- Campeonato Brasileiro Série D: 2016

Remo

- Campeonato Paraense: 2022
