= Ricardo Luz =

Brazilian association football player

Personal information
- Full name: Ricardo Luz Araújo
- Date of birth: 23 February 1995 (age 31)
- Place of birth: Timóteo, Brazil
- Height: 1.76 m (5 ft 9 1/2 in)
- Position: Right-back

Team information
- Current team: Botafogo
- Number: 2

Senior career*
Years	Team	Apps	(Gls)
2015–2016	Villa Nova	5	(0)
2017	Social	8	(0)
2017	Democrata	15	(0)
2018	Guarani-MG	14	(1)
2018	Atlético Goianiense	0	(0)
2018	Araxá	6	(1)
2019	Brasil de Pelotas	35	(0)
2020	Santo André	13	(0)
2020	Remo	20	(0)
2021	Novorizontino	11	(0)
2021	Londrina	12	(0)
2021–	Mirassol	2	(0)
- * Club domestic league appearances and goals as of 14:51, 13 June 2019 (UTC)

Ricardo Luz Araújo is a Brazilian footballer who plays as a right-back for Botafogo.

== Honours ==
Remo

- Campeonato Paraense: 2022
