= Erick Flores =

Brazilian footballer (born 1989)

Personal information
- Full name: Erick Flores Bonfim
- Date of birth: April 30, 1989 (age 37)
- Place of birth: Rio de Janeiro, RJ, Brazil
- Height: 1.69 m (5 ft 7 in)
- Position: Attacking midfielder

Team information
- Current team: Flamurtari
- Number: 13

Youth career
- 2003–2009: Flamengo

Senior career*
Years	Team	Apps	(Gls)
2008–2013	Flamengo	28	(0)
2010	→ Ceará (loan)	16	(1)
2010	→ Náutico (loan)	20	(3)
2011	→ Boavista (loan)	14	(2)
2011	→ Duque de Caxias (loan)	21	(2)
2012	→ Itumbiara (loan)	16	(1)
2012	→ Avaí (loan)	6	(0)
2013	→ Boavista (loan)	13	(0)
2013	→ ABC (loan)	22	(2)
2014	São Bernardo	9	(1)
2014	Fortaleza	10	(0)
2015	Boavista	16	(2)
2015–2016	FK Kukësi	30	(7)
2017	Boavista	10	(1)
2017	Criciúma	0	(0)
2017–2018	Boavista	10	(2)
2017	→ Criciúma (loan)	7	(0)
2018	→ Brasiliense (loan)	8	(0)
2019	Brasiliense	11	(0)
2019–2022	Boavista	26	(1)
2021	→ Remo (loan)	17	(1)
2022	Remo	13	(1)
2022–	Flamurtari	19	(4)
- * Club domestic league appearances and goals as of 19 May 2023

Erick Flores Bonfim or simply Erick Flores (born April 30, 1989 in Rio de Janeiro) is a Brazilian attacking midfielder who plays for Flamurtari in Albanian Kategoria e Parë.

== Career ==
=== Flamengo ===
Erick is considered one of the most talented young players of Flamengo. After recognized attention, he got promoted to the first-team in the first half of 2008 and signed his first professional contract until December 31, 2012. His first official match was on Mineirão coming from the bench in the 1-1 draw against Atlético Mineiro on July 9, 2008.

=== Ceará ===
For the 2010 season Flamengo loaned out Erick to the recently Brazilian Série A promoted club Ceará expecting him to get more first team experience.

=== FK Kukësi ===
He left Boavista and Brazil for the first time in his professional career to join Albanian Superliga side FK Kukësi ahead of the Europa League first qualifying round. He made his FK Kukësi and European debut on 2 July 2015 against Belarusian side FC Torpedo-BelAZ Zhodino in the first qualifying round of the Europa League, where he played the full 90 minutes in the 2–0 win.

In the second match of second qualifying round, Flores scored the third goal of the team in the 32nd minute of the match, in an eventual 4–2 away win, helping Kukësi to qualify in the next round with the aggregate 4–3.

In the 2015-2016 season, he established himself as a regular starter for the club since his arrival from Brazil. He scored 6 league goals in 30 league appearances in which he started in every game he played in the league, along with 2 goals in the Albanian Cup. On 25 April 2016, his season ended early with a knee injury which is likely to keep him out for in between 4–6 months.

== Career statistics ==
As of 5 December 2011

Club	Season	State League		National League		Cup		Continental		Copa Sudamericana		Total	
Club	Season	Apps	Goals	Apps	Goals	Apps	Goals	Apps	Goals	Apps	Goals	Apps	Goals
Flamengo	2008	-	-	8	0	-	-	-	-	-	-	8	0
Flamengo	2009	7	0	8	0	3	0	-	-	-	-	18	0
Flamengo	2010	2	0	0	0	-	-	0	0	-	-	2	0
Ceará (loan)	2010	12	5	10	1	2	0	-	-	-	-	24	6
Náutico (loan)	2010												
Boavista (loan)	2011	14	2	-	-	-	-	-	-	-	-	14	2
Duque de Caxias (loan)	2011												
FK Kukësi	2015–16	3	2	–	–	–	–	6	1	–	–	9	3
Total		38	9	60	3	5	0	6	1	-	-	109	13

according to combined sources on the Flamengo official website and Flaestatística.

- In 2010 Erick played for Náutico in the Brazilian Série B.
- In 2011 Erick played for Duque de Caxias in the Brazilian Série B.

== Honours ==
Flamengo

- Campeonato Carioca: 2009
- Campeonato Brasileiro Série A: 2009

Remo

- Copa Verde: 2021
- Campeonato Paraense: 2022
