= Fernandinho (footballer, born 1992) =

Brazilian footballer

Personal information
- Full name: Fernando Nathan Padilha de Arruda
- Date of birth: 26 March 1992 (age 34)
- Place of birth: Cuiabá, Brazil
- Height: 1.78 m (5 ft 10 in)
- Position: Left winger

Team information
- Current team: Votuporanguense

Youth career
- 2011: Cacerense

Senior career*
Years	Team	Apps	(Gls)
2011	Cacerense		
2011–2013	Cuiabá		
2012	→ Iporá (loan)		
2013–2015	Operário-MT		
2015	→ Sinop (loan)		
2016	Dom Bosco		
2017	Rio Claro		
2017–2019	Portuguesa		
2019	→ São Caetano (loan)		
2020	Ypiranga-RS		
2020	Ferroviária		
2021	Ituano		
2022	Remo		
2022	Brusque		
2022	Água Santa		
2023	São Bento		
2023	Amazonas		
2023–2024	Al-Hussein (JOR)		
2025	Uberlândia		
2025	Ituano		
2026–	Votuporanguense		
- * Club domestic league appearances and goals as of 7 November 2025

Fernando Nathan Padilha de Arruda (born 26 March 1992), simply known as Fernandinho, is a Brazilian professional footballer who plays as a left winger.

== Career ==
Born in Cuiabá, Fernandinho began his football career in Mato Grosso. In 2017, he moved to São Paulo football in Rio Claro, and after playing for some clubs in the state and for Ypiranga-RS, he was part of the Serie C champion squad with Ituano in 2021. He later played for Remo, being state champion, Brusque, and returned to São Paulo football at EC Água Santa. In 2023 he had a short spell at Amazonas FC, and in August he transferred to Al-Hussein SC from Irbid, Jordan.

On 2025, Fernandinho played for Uberlândia and Ituano. For the 2026 season, he signed with CA Votuporanguense.

== Honours ==
Cuiabá

- Campeonato Matogrossense: 2013

Ituano

- Campeonato Brasileiro Série C: 2021

Remo

- Campeonato Paraense: 2022

Amazonas

- Campeonato Brasileiro Série C: 2023

Al Hussein

- Jordanian Pro League: 2023–24
