= Marciel (footballer, born 1995) =

Brazilian footballer

Personal information
- Full name: Marciel Silva da Silva
- Date of birth: 8 March 1995 (age 31)
- Place of birth: Porto Alegre, Brazil
- Height: 1.86 m (6 ft 1 in)
- Position: Midfielder

Team information
- Current team: Ninh Binh
- Number: 22

Youth career
- 2005–2012: Grêmio
- 2012–2015: Fragata
- 2012–2013: → Roma (loan)
- 2014–2015: → Corinthians (loan)

Senior career*
Years	Team	Apps	(Gls)
2015–2020	Corinthians	16	(1)
2016	→ Cruzeiro (loan)	5	(0)
2018	→ Ponte Preta (loan)	28	(2)
2018–2019	→ Oeste (loan)	25	(2)
2020	→ Juventude (loan)	40	(0)
2021	Náutico	40	(1)
2022	Remo	16	(0)
2023	Caxias	20	(0)
2023	CSA	8	(1)
2024–2026	Hoang Anh Gia Lai	47	(6)
2026–	Ninh Binh	0	(0)
- * Club domestic league appearances and goals as of 7 June 2026

Marciel Silva da Silva (born 8 March 1995) is a Brazilian professional footballer who plays as a midfielder for V.League 1 club Ninh Binh.

== Career ==
=== Early life ===
Marciel began playing for Grêmio's academy at the age of ten. He was part of the team until 2012, when he was released. He joined a youth project team called Fragata, owned by former Brazil national football team player Emerson. He eventually draw attention of Juventus, but signed a loan deal on the same year with Roma's academy. The loan ended in 2013 as Marciel didn't have an EU passport, therefore being unable to continue. In April 2014, Marciel signed a loan deal with Corinthians' academy and had a very successful campaign. He won the 2014 U20 Campeonato Paulista, 2014 U20 Campeonato Brasileiro and the 2015 Copa São Paulo de Futebol Júnior, including being chosen as the best player of the latter tournament.

=== Corinthians ===
Marciel was bought by R$1,000,000 and promoted to Corinthians main squad in February 2015, right after the end of Copa São Paulo de Futebol Júnior.

Marciel made his professional debut on 27 June 2015, as he entered in the second half of Corinthians' 2–1 victory against Figueirense at Arena Corinthians. He made his first league start in a home win against Fluminense on September 2. He also scored his first goal for Corinthians, as he netted the first goal of a 2–0 victory.

=== Hoang Anh Gia Lai ===
In September 2024, Marciel signed a contract with Vietnamese V.League 1 side Hoang Anh Gia Lai.

=== Ninh Binh ===
In July 2026, Marciel moved to V.League 1 fellow Ninh Binh.

== Statistics ==
As of match played 10 September 2015.

Club	Season	National League		National Cup		Libertadores		Copa Sudamericana		State League		Friendly		Total	
Club	Season	App	Goals	App	Goals	App	Goals	App	Goals	App	Goals	App	Goals	App	Goals
Corinthians	2015	4	1	0	0	0	0	0	0	0	0	1	0	5	1
Corinthians	2016	1	0	0	0	0	0	0	0	0	0	1	0	2	0
Total		5	1	0	0	0	0	0	0	0	0	2	0	7	1

== Honours ==
Corinthians

- Campeonato Brasileiro Série A: 2015, 2017
- Campeonato Paulista: 2017

Remo

- Campeonato Paraense: 2022
