= Wendson =

Brazilian footballer

Personal information
- Full name: Wendson dos Santos Lopes
- Date of birth: 22 August 1997 (age 29)
- Place of birth: São Pedro da Aldeia, Brazil
- Position: Forward

Team information
- Current team: Vila Nova

Youth career
- 2017: Arraial do Cabo
- 2018: Sampaio Corrêa-RJ

Senior career*
Years	Team	Apps	(Gls)
2019–2023	Sampaio Corrêa-RJ	27	(4)
2020	→ Rio Branco de Venda Nova (loan)	7	(0)
2021	→ Ferroviário (loan)	13	(3)
2021	→ Ceará (loan)	6	(1)
2022	→ Volta Redonda (loan)	18	(2)
2023	→ Vila Nova (loan)	8	(0)
2023	→ Botafogo PB (loan)	3	(0)
2023–2024	Al-Jeel		
2024–	Vila Nova		
- * Club domestic league appearances and goals as of 14:32, 25 October 2021 (UTC)

Wendson dos Santos Lopes (born 22 August 1997), simply known as Wendson, is a Brazilian footballer who plays as a forward for Vila Nova.

== Club career ==
Born in São Pedro da Aldeia, Rio de Janeiro, Wendson represented Arraial do Cabo and Sampaio Corrêa-RJ as a youth. He made his senior debut with the latter on 25 May 2019, in a 0–0 Campeonato Carioca Série B1 home draw against Goytacaz.

Wendson started the 2020 campaign on loan at Rio Branco de Venda Nova, but subsequently returned to his parent club and helped the side in their promotion to the Campeonato Carioca; Rio Branco also won the Campeonato Capixaba later on. On 21 February 2021, after impressing in the first stage of the 2021 Carioca, he moved to Ferroviário also in a temporary deal.

On 27 May 2021, Wendson moved to Série A side Ceará on loan until December 2022. He made his debut in the category three days later, coming on as a late substitute for Rick in a 3–2 home success over Grêmio.

On 27 July 2023, Wendson joined Saudi Second Division side Al-Jeel.

== Career statistics ==
As of 25 October 2021

Club	Season	League			State League		Cup		Continental		Other		Total	
Club	Season	Division	Apps	Goals	Apps	Goals	Apps	Goals	Apps	Goals	Apps	Goals	Apps	Goals
Sampaio Corrêa-RJ	2019	Carioca B1	—		3	0	—		—		2	0	5	0
Sampaio Corrêa-RJ	2020	Carioca B1	—		15	2	—		—		—		15	2
Sampaio Corrêa-RJ	2021	Carioca	—		9	2	—		—		—		13	1
Sampaio Corrêa-RJ	Total		—		27	4	—		—		2	0	29	4
Rio Branco de Venda Nova (loan)	2020	Capixaba	—		7	0	—		—		—		7	0
Ferroviário (loan)	2021	Série C	0	0	13	3	2	0	—		—		15	3
Ceará (loan)	2021	Série A	6	1	—		—		—		—		6	1
Career total			6	1	47	7	2	0	0	0	2	0	57	8

== Honours ==
Rio Branco de Venda Nova

- Campeonato Capixaba: 2020
