= Clairton Netto =

Brazilian footballer (born 1998)

Personal information
- Full name: Clairton Norchang Netto
- Date of birth: 28 February 1998 (age 28)
- Place of birth: Ituiutaba, Brazil
- Height: 1.74 m (5 ft 9 in)
- Position: Forward

Team information
- Current team: Santa Cruz-RS

Youth career
- 2007–2017: São Paulo
- 2017–2020: Internacional

Senior career*
Years	Team	Apps	(Gls)
2019–2020	Internacional	2	(0)
2020–2021	Mirassol	22	(1)
2020	→ CSA (loan)	3	(0)
2021	→ Brasil de Pelotas (loan)	11	(2)
2021	Brasil de Pelotas	30	(1)
2022	Ferroviária	6	(1)
2022	Remo	13	(1)
2023	São José-RS	9	(0)
2023	Ypiranga-RS	17	(2)
2024–	Santa Cruz-RS	10	(0)
- * Club domestic league appearances and goals as of 18:32, 24 April 2024 (UTC)

Clairton Norchang Netto (born 28 February 1998) is a Brazilian professional footballer who plays as a forward for Santa Cruz-RS.

== Professional career ==
A youth product of São Paulo FC, Netto was released in 2018 after a knee surgery, and signed with Internacional. Netto made his professional debut with Internacional in a 4-3 Campeonato Gaúcho win over São Luiz on 30 January 2020.
