= Leonan (footballer, born 1995) =

Brazilian footballer

Personal information
- Full name: Leonan José Valandro Gomes
- Date of birth: 28 October 1995 (age 31)
- Place of birth: Engenho Velho, Brazil
- Height: 1.74 m (5 ft 8 1/2 in)
- Position: Left back

Team information
- Current team: Anápolis

Youth career
- 2006–2011: Grêmio
- 2011–2012: Caxias
- 2012–2013: Marcílio Dias
- 2013–2016: Atlético Mineiro

Senior career*
Years	Team	Apps	(Gls)
2013	Marcílio Dias	0	(0)
2014–2019	Atlético Mineiro	9	(0)
2018	→ Fortaleza (loan)	24	(4)
2019	→ Botafogo-SP (loan)	11	(0)
2020–2021	Avaí	6	(1)
2020–2021	→ Santa Cruz (loan)	15	(0)
2021	Santa Cruz	12	(0)
2022	Portuguesa (RJ)	0	(0)
2022–2023	Remo	44	(4)
2024	Retrô	24	(1)
2025	Figueirense	18	(0)
2026–	Anápolis	20	(3)
- * Club domestic league appearances and goals as of 29 September 2026

Leonan José Valandro Gomes (born 28 October 1995), simply known as Leonan, is a Brazilian professional footballer who plays as for Anápolis a left back.

== Club career ==
Born in Engenho Velho, Rio Grande do Sul, Leonan started his career at Grêmio's youth setup in 2006. Released in 2011, he represented Caxias and Marcílio Dias, making his senior debut with the latter on 1 September 2013 by starting in a 1–0 Campeonato Catarinense Divisão Especial home win against Canoinhas AC.

Leonan joined Atlético Mineiro in 2013, after impressing in a trial period. He was promoted to the first team ahead of the 2016 season by manager Diego Aguirre, but only made his professional debut on 23 October of that year by starting in a 3–0 home win against Figueirense for the Série A championship.

In 2018, Leonan joined Fortaleza on loan and took part in the 2018 Campeonato Brasileiro Série B winning campaign.

Leonan joined Santa Cruz Futebol Clube in October 2020. In 2021, he took part in the campaign that relegated the club to Campeonato Brasileiro Série D.

In 2022, Leonan joined Clube do Remo, a football club based in Belém that plays in Campeonato Brasileiro Série C. During the season, Leonan missed the decisive penalty shoot-out against Cruzeiro that would advance Remo to the next round of Copa do Brasil. In 2023, Leonan missed another penalty in the Copa do Brasil shoot-out, this time against Sport Club Corinthians Paulista, contributing to another elimination. Leonan played the finals of Campeonato Paraense, but his club was defeated by Águia de Marabá Futebol Clube, a club that had never been state champion.

== Honours ==
Atlético Mineiro

- Campeonato Mineiro: 2017

Fortaleza

- Campeonato Brasileiro Série B: 2018

Remo

- Campeonato Paraense: 2022

Retrô

- Campeonato Brasileiro Série D: 2024

Figueirense

- Copa Santa Catarina: 2025
