= João Paulo (footballer, born July 1990) =

Brazilian footballer

Personal information
- Full name: João Paulo Purcino de Almeida
- Date of birth: 20 July 1990 (age 36)
- Place of birth: Pouso Alto, Brazil
- Height: 1.72 m (5 ft 7 1/2 in)
- Position: Left back

Team information
- Current team: Pouso Alegre

Youth career
- Fluminense

Senior career*
Years	Team	Apps	(Gls)
2008–2013	Fluminense	35	(0)
2010	→ Figueirense (loan)	26	(1)
2011	→ Ponte Preta (loan)	35	(1)
2012	→ Criciúma (loan)	14	(0)
2012	→ Náutico (loan)	13	(0)
2013	→ Mogi Mirim (loan)	11	(0)
2013	Icasa	0	(0)
2014	Linense	9	(0)
2014–	Tombense	42	(2)
2014–2015	→ Ponte Preta (loan)	11	(1)
2015–2016	→ Bahia (loan)	15	(0)
2016–2018	→ Avaí (loan)	35	(0)
2019	→ CRB (loan)	4	(0)
2021	→ Confiança (loan)	30	(3)
2022	Paysandu	5	(0)
2023	Pouso Alegre	0	(0)
- * Club domestic league appearances and goals as of 1 April 2023

João Paulo Purcino de Almeida (born 20 July 1990), known as João Paulo, is a Brazilian footballer who plays as a left back.

== Career ==
Born in Pouso Alto, João Paulo was a graduate of Fluminense FC's youth system. After he joined Fluminense's senior side, João Paulo was sent on a series of loans (to Figueirense Futebol Clube, Associação Atlética Ponte Preta, Criciúma Esporte Clube and Clube Náutico Capibaribe). In July 2012, João Paulo would make his debut for Náutico in Campeonato Brasileiro Série A at age 21.

After João Paulo left Fluminense, he had spells with Tombense Futebol Clube, Esporte Clube Bahia, Avaí FC and Clube de Regatas Brasil. In 2021, he joined Associação Desportiva Confiança, appearing in 30 matches for the club in Série B. After Confiança were relegated, João Paulo joined Paysandu.
