= Bruno Alves (footballer, born 1992) =

Brazilian footballer

Personal information
- Full name: Bruno Alves de Souza
- Date of birth: 13 September 1992 (age 34)
- Place of birth: Seabra, Brazil
- Height: 1.78 m (5 ft 10 in)
- Position: Forward

Team information
- Current team: Ituano

Youth career
- Sport Barueri

Senior career*
Years	Team	Apps	(Gls)
2012–2013	Real Noroeste	0	(0)
2014	Macaé	34	(2)
2015	Náutico	38	(3)
2016	Giresunspor	8	(1)
2016–2017	Red Bull Brasil	24	(6)
2018	Cuiabá	16	(1)
2019	Caxias	14	(3)
2019–2020	Juventude	35	(3)
2019	→ CSA (loan)	12	(0)
2020	Oeste	17	(2)
2021	Brusque	43	(2)
2022	Remo	32	(7)
2022	Ponte Preta	6	(0)
2023	Paysandu	34	(4)
2024–	Ituano	39	(4)
- * Club domestic league appearances and goals as of 11 November 2026

Bruno Alves de Souza (born 13 September 1992), or simply Bruno Alves, is a Brazilian footballer who plays as a forward for Ituano.

== Honours ==
Macaé

- Campeonato Brasileiro Série C: 2014

Cuiabá

- Campeonato Mato-Grossense: 2018

Remo

- Campeonato Paraense: 2022
