= Paulo Bonamigo =

Brazilian footballer

Personal information
- Full name: Paulo Afonso Bonamigo
- Date of birth: 23 September 1960 (age 66)
- Place of birth: Ijuí, Brazil
- Position: Midfielder

Senior career*
Years	Team	Apps	(Gls)
1980–1988	Grêmio	125	(6)
1989–1991	Internacional	31	(0)
1994	Botafogo	16	(0)
1995	Bahia	16	(0)
Total		188	(6)

Managerial career
- 1998: Madureira
- 1998–2000: Joinville
- 2000: Sampaio Corrêa
- 2000: Remo
- 2002: Mogi Mirim
- 2001–2002: Paraná
- 2002–2003: Coritiba
- 2004: Atlético Mineiro
- 2004–2005: Botafogo
- 2005: Palmeiras
- 2005–2006: Marítimo
- 2006: Coritiba
- 2007: Fortaleza
- 2007: Goiás
- 2007: Paraná
- 2008–2009: Ponte Preta
- 2009: Portuguesa
- 2009: Bahia
- 2009–2012: Al Shabab
- 2012–2013: Al Jazira
- 2013–2015: Sharjah
- 2017: Fortaleza
- 2017–2018: Al Qadsiah
- 2020: Boavista
- 2020–2021: Remo
- 2022: Remo
- * Club domestic league appearances and goals

Paulo Afonso Bonamigo (born 23 September 1960) is a Brazilian professional football coach and former player who most recently managed Clube do Remo.

== Career ==
Born in Ijuí, Rio Grande do Sul, Bonamigo started his career playing for Grêmio. Later he went on to play for other teams such as Internacional, Botafogo-RJ, and Bahia.

Bonamigo started his coaching career in 1998 with Madureira, before taking over Joinville in the same year. In 2000 trains Sampaio Corrêa, Remo and Mogi Mirim while in the two following years is at Paraná. In 2002 and 2003 trains Coritiba the mind in 2004, after being coach of Atlético Mineiro, where is Botafogo relieved to mid-season to then be hired by Palmeiras, where it remains up to the rest of the championship in 2005.

In the summer of 2005 he moved in Maritimo where fails to achieve success and then decides to return to train in Brazil, before again Coritiba then Fortaleza, Goiás, Paraná, Ponte Preta, Portuguesa and subsequently in Bahia.

In 2009 Bonamigo moved to Al Shabab where he remained until the end of the 2011–12 season, then moved to Al Jazira where he remained until mid-season before being exempted due to the lack of results.

== Honors ==
=== Player ===
Grêmio

- Campeonato Gaúcho: 1980, 1985, 1986, 1987, 1988
- Campeonato Brasileiro Série A: 1981
- Copa Libertadores: 1983
- Intercontinental Cup: 1983

Internacional

- Campeonato Gaúcho: 1991

=== Coach ===
Coritiba

- Campeonato Paranaense: 2003

Fortaleza

- Campeonato Cearense: 2007

Al Shabab

- UAE League Cup: 2010–11
- GCC Champions League: 2011

Remo

- Campeonato Paraense: 2022
