= Brenner (footballer, born 1994) =

Brazilian footballer (born 1994)

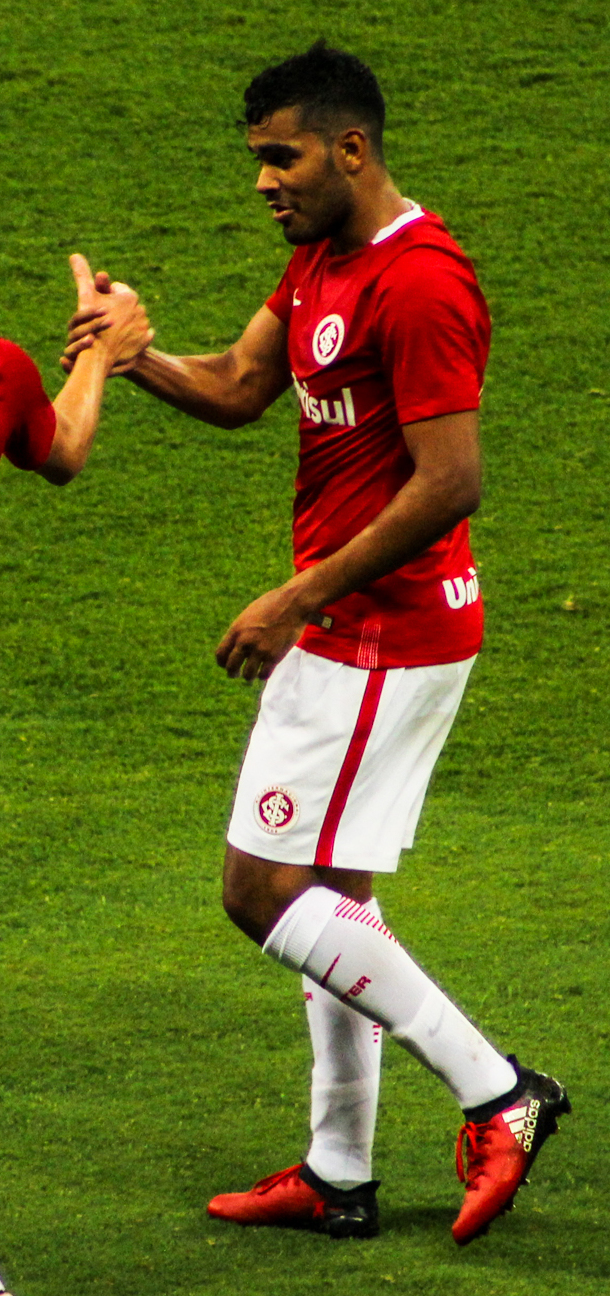

Personal information
- Full name: Brenner Marlos Varanda de Oliveira
- Date of birth: 1 March 1994 (age 32)
- Place of birth: Várzea Grande, Brazil
- Height: 1.82 m (5 ft 11 1/2 in)
- Position: Forward

Team information
- Current team: Bac Ninh
- Number: 9

Youth career
- 2010–2012: Juventude

Senior career*
Years	Team	Apps	(Gls)
2012–2016	Juventude	37	(14)
2016–2020	Internacional	19	(7)
2017–2018	→ Botafogo (loan)	57	(15)
2019	→ Goiás (loan)	13	(4)
2019	→ Avaí (loan)	14	(2)
2020	Bangkok United	10	(3)
2021	Fagiano Okayama	2	(0)
2022	Remo	30	(11)
2022	Ituano	9	(3)
2023–2024	Sporting Cristal	30	(13)
2024–2025	América Mineiro	27	(6)
2025–2026	Thep Xanh Nam Dinh	25	(10)
2026–	Bac Ninh	6	(3)
- * Club domestic league appearances and goals as of 30 October 2026

Brenner Marlos Varanda de Oliveira (born 1 March 1994), simply known as Brenner, is a Brazilian professional footballer who plays as a forward for V.League 1 club Bac Ninh.

== Career ==
In May 2019, he joined Avaí.

On 1 February 2025, Brenner moved to Vietnam, joining V.League 1 club Thep Xanh Nam Dinh.

In August 2026, Brenner moved to newly promoted V.League 1 side Bac Ninh.

== Career statistics ==
As of 19 November 2019.

Appearances and goals by club, season and competition
Club	Season	League			State League		Cup		Continental		Other		Total	
Club	Season	Division	Apps	Goals	Apps	Goals	Apps	Goals	Apps	Goals	Apps	Goals	Apps	Goals
Juventude	2012	Série D	0	0	2 (Note: Appearances in the Campeonato Gaúcho)	0	1 (Note: Appearances in the Copa do Brasil)	0	—		—		3	0
Juventude	2013	Série D	3	0	2	0	—		—		—		5	0
Juventude	2014	Série C	3	0	3	0	—		—		—		6	0
Juventude	2015	Série C	9	6	6	1	—		—		—		15	7
Juventude	2016	Série C	—		9	7	—		—		—		9	7
Juventude	Total		15	6	22	8	1	0	—		—		38	14
Internacional	2016	Série A	1	0	—		1	0	—		—		2	0
Internacional	2017	Série B	6	0	12	7	7	5	—		1 (Note: Appearances in the Primeira Liga)	1	26	13
Internacional	Total		7	0	12	7	8	5	—		1	1	28	13
Botafogo (loan)	2017	Série A	18	6	—		—		1 (Note: Appearances in the Copa Libertadores)	0	—		19	6
Botafogo (loan)	2018	Série A	24	3	15 (Note: Appearances in the Campeonato Carioca)	6	1	0	5 (Note: Appearances in the Copa Sudamericana)	1	—		45	10
Botafogo (loan)	Total		42	9	15	6	1	0	6	1	—		64	16
Goiás (loan)	2019	Série A	0	0	13 (Note: Appearances in the Campeonato Goiano)	4	2	0	—		—		15	4
Avaí (loan)	2019	Série A	14	2	—		—		—		—		14	2
Career total			78	14	62	25	13	6	6	1	0	0	157	48

== Honours ==
Botafogo

- Campeonato Carioca: 2018

Remo

- Campeonato Paraense: 2022

Thép Xanh Nam Định

- V.League 1: 2024–25

Individual

- Campeonato Gaúcho top scorer: 2017
