= Raul (footballer, born 2000) =

Brazilian footballer

Personal information
- Full name: Raul di Orlando Barbosa Mendes
- Date of birth: 14 August 2000 (age 26)
- Place of birth: Jangada, Brazil
- Position: Forward

Team information
- Current team: Remo
- Number: 77

Youth career
- 2017: São Luiz-RS
- 2017: Vila Nova
- 2019–2020: Cuiabá
- 2020: → Fortaleza (loan)

Senior career*
Years	Team	Apps	(Gls)
2019–2022	Cuiabá	14	(5)
2022–	Remo	0	(0)
- * Club domestic league appearances and goals as of 16:02, 29 October 2021 (UTC)

Raul di Orlando Barbosa Mendes (born 14 August 2000), simply known as Raul or sometimes Raulzinho, is a Brazilian professional footballer who plays as a forward for Remo.

== Club career ==
Born in Jangada, Mato Grosso, Raul was a Cuiabá youth graduate. He made his first team debut on 15 August 2019, coming on as a late substitute for Hugo Cabral in a 0–1 home loss against Iporá, for the year's Copa Verde, and also missed his penalty in the 6–5 shoot-out win.

On 23 September 2020, after being rarely used, Raul was loaned to Fortaleza and returned to the youth setup. Upon returning, he started to feature more regularly in the 2021 Campeonato Mato-Grossense, being a regular starter before suffering a minor injury in March 2021.

On 1 May 2021, Raul renewed his contract with the Dourado until the end of 2023.

== Career statistics ==
As of 29 October 2021

Club	Season	League			State League		Cup		Continental		Other		Total	
Club	Season	Division	Apps	Goals	Apps	Goals	Apps	Goals	Apps	Goals	Apps	Goals	Apps	Goals
Cuiabá	2019	Série B	0	0	0	0	0	0	—		11 (Note: One appearance in Copa Verde, ten appearances and two goals in Copa FMF)	2	11	2
Cuiabá	2020	Série B	0	0	2	0	0	0	—		0	0	2	0
Cuiabá	2021	Série A	0	0	12	5	1	0	—		5 (Note: Four appearances in Copa FMF, one appearance in Copa Verde)	0	18	5
Career total			0	0	14	5	1	0	0	0	16	2	31	7

== Honours ==
Cuiabá

- Copa Verde: 2019

Remo

- Campeonato Paraense: 2022
