= Anderson Uchôa =

Brazilian footballer (born 1991)

Personal information
- Full name: Anderson Uchôa dos Santos
- Date of birth: February 4, 1991 (age 35)
- Place of birth: Aracaju, Brazil
- Height: 1.81 m (5 ft 11 in)
- Position: Defensive midfielder

Team information
- Current team: Ypiranga
- Number: 91

Youth career
- 2007–2009: Cruzeiro

Senior career*
| Years | Team | Apps | (Gls) |
| 2009–2010 | Cruzeiro | 4 | (0) |
| 2011 | Cabofriense | 0 | (0) |
| 2011–2012 | Villa Nova | 18 | (2) |
| 2012–2013 | Ipatinga | 24 | (3) |
| 2013 | Avaí | 19 | (1) |
| 2014 | Criciúma | 5 | (0) |
| 2014–2015 | Bragantino | 23 | (0) |
| 2015–2016 | Paraná | 53 | (2) |
| 2017–2018 | Fortaleza | 41 | (1) |
| 2019 | Ferroviária | 8 | (0) |
| 2019–2021 | Paysandu | 45 | (3) |
| 2021–2023 | Remo | 79 | (6) |
| 2024– | Ypiranga | 0 | (0) |
- * Club domestic league appearances and goals as of 23 November 2023

Anderson Uchôa dos Santos (born 4 February 1991 in Aracaju), or simply Anderson Uchôa, is a Brazilian footballer who plays as a defensive midfielder for Ypiranga.

== Honours ==
Fortaleza

- Campeonato Brasileiro Série B: 2018

Paysandu

- Campeonato Paraense: 2020

Remo

- Copa Verde: 2021
- Campeonato Paraense: 2022
