= Marlon (footballer, born 1985) =

Brazilian footballer

Personal information
- Full name: Marlon Farias Castelo Branco
- Date of birth: 14 September 1985 (age 41)
- Place of birth: Belém, Brazil
- Height: 1.82 m (6 ft 0 in)
- Position: Defender

Team information
- Current team: Tuna Luso

Senior career*
Years	Team	Apps	(Gls)
2006	Pinheirense	0	(0)
2007	Tuna Luso	2	(0)
2008–2011	Remo	13	(3)
2011	Vila Nova	1	(0)
2012	Novo Hamburgo	17	(6)
2012–2013	Criciúma	94	(10)
2014–2015	Vasco da Gama	34	(4)
2015	→ Paysandu (loan)	13	(1)
2015	→ Bahia (loan)	15	(1)
2016	Capivariano	5	(1)
2016	Águia de Marabá	2	(0)
2016–2017	Brasil de Pelotas	60	(3)
2018	Mirassol	9	(1)
2018–2019	Criciúma	90	(1)
2020	Águia de Marabá	1	(0)
2020	Santo André	12	(0)
2020–2022	Remo	102	(3)
2023	São Bento	9	(0)
2023–	Tuna Luso	0	(0)
- * Club domestic league appearances and goals as of 15 March 2023

Marlon Farias Castelo Branco (born 14 September 1985 in Belém), or simply Marlon, is a Brazilian professional footballer who plays as a defender for Tuna Luso.

== Honours ==
Remo

- Campeonato Paraense: 2008, 2022
- Copa Verde: 2021

Criciúma

- Campeonato Catarinense: 2013

Tuna Luso

- Copa Grão-Pará: 2024
