= Sociedade Esportiva Caeté =

Brazilian association football club based in Bragança, Pará, Brazil

Caeté
- Full name: Sociedade Esportiva Caeté
- Nickname(s): Guerreiro Caeteuara (Warrior from Caeté)
- Founded: 27 February 2019; 6 years ago
- Ground: Diogão
- Capacity: 11,000
- President: Rodrigo Barata
- League: Campeonato Paraense
- 2022: Paraense, 6th of 12
- Website: https://pt-br.facebook.com/seccaete/
Home colors	Away colors

Sociedade Esportiva Caeté, commonly referred to as Caeté, is a Brazilian professional club based in Bragança, Pará founded on 27 February 2019. It competes in the Campeonato Paraense, the top flight of the Pará state football league.

== History ==
The idea of founding the club came from Rodrigo Barata, who held the post of director in Bragantino, but after disagreements with the management of the time, in 2018 gave the beginning with help from other former club leaders to found the second club in the city, this initially focused on the basic categories. To honor the first inhabitants of the region, the founders decided to adopt Caeté as the club's name, which refers to the indigenous people of the Caetés tribe. Still following this line, they chose the color red as a reference to their ancestors. The green refers to the name, which means strong forest or true forest in the Tupi language.

== Stadium ==
Caeté play their home games at Diogão. The stadium has a maximum capacity of 11,000 people.

== Rivalries ==
Caeté's biggest rival is Bragantino. The duel between the two clubs is called the Clássico da Farinha (Flour derby).
