= Paulo Rangel (footballer) =

Brazilian footballer

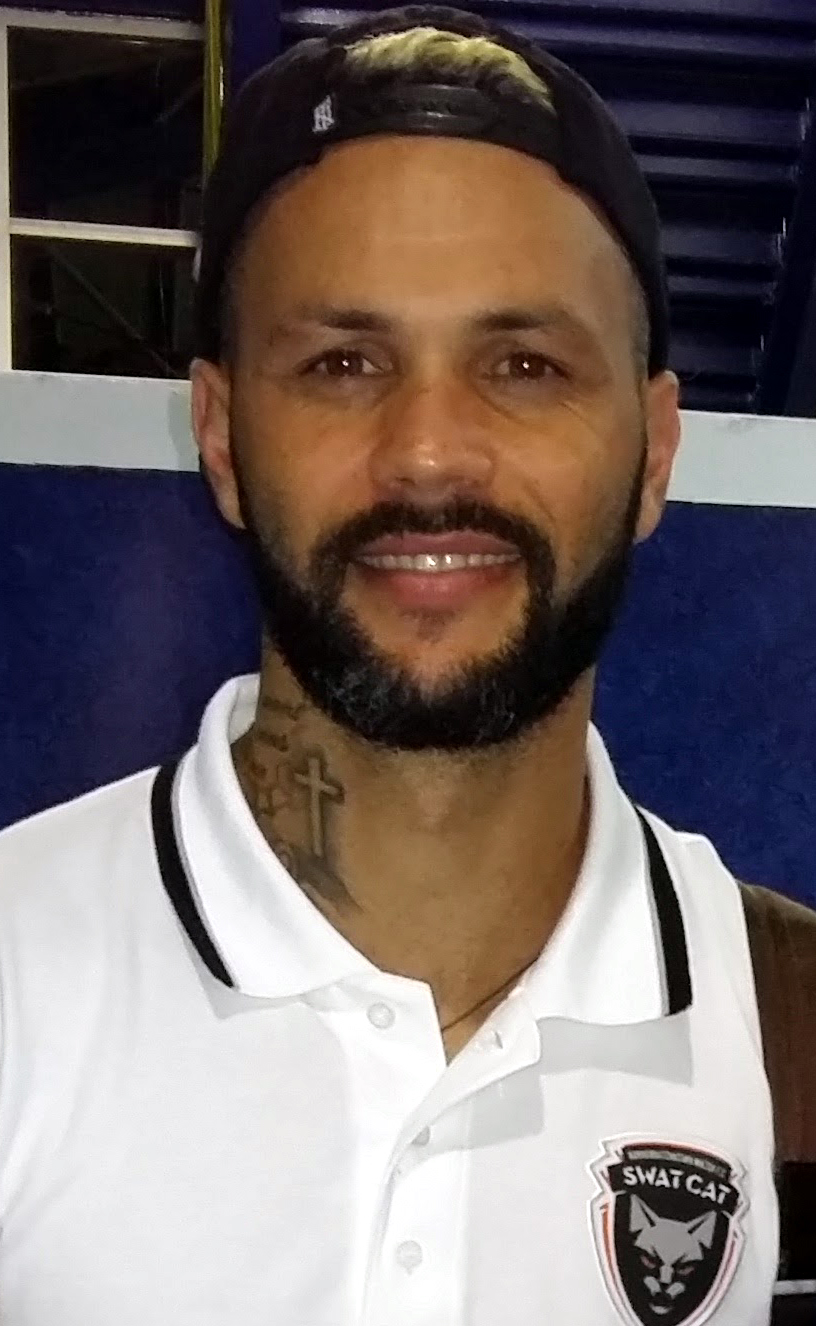

Personal information
- Full name: Paulo Rangel do Nascimento Gomes
- Date of birth: 4 February 1985 (age 41)
- Place of birth: Belém (PA), Brazil
- Height: 1.88 m (6 ft 2 in)
- Position: Forward

Youth career
- 2002: Boavista

Senior career*
Years	Team	Apps	(Gls)
2003–2004	Boavista	1	(0)
2004–2005	Varzim	25	(5)
2005	Gondomar	9	(1)
2005–2006	Maia	8	(1)
2006–2007	Lousada	22	(10)
2007–2008	Baraúnas	0	(0)
2008	Potiguar	0	(0)
2008–2009	Dibba Al-Hisn	23	(15)
2009–2010	Salgueiro	4	(2)
2009–2010	Santa Cruz	0	(0)
2010	São José	0	(0)
2010	Salgueiro	4	(1)
2010	São Raimundo (PA)	2	(1)
2011	Lajeadense	0	(0)
2011	Caxias	4	(1)
2011	Cuiabá	2	(0)
2011–2012	São José	0	(0)
2012	Icasa	2	(0)
2012–2013	Muangthong United	24	(12)
2013	→ Perak (loan)	10	(9)
2013–2014	Selangor	19	(16)
2014–2015	Terengganu	10	(8)
2015	Johor Darul Ta'zim	0	(0)
2016	Johor Darul Ta'zim II	18	(19)
2017	Londrina	0	(0)
2017–2018	Nakhon Ratchasima	31	(16)
2018	Kedah	6	(5)
2019	Paysandu	4	(1)
2020	Madureira	3	(0)
2020	Linense	2	(0)
2021	Paragominas	13	(3)
2022	Tuna Luso	3	(0)
2022	Altos	7	(1)
2023	Tuna Luso	16	(7)
2024	Moto	16	(9)
Total		294	(143)
- * Club domestic league appearances and goals as of 15:50, 25 August 2020 (UTC)

Paulo Rangel do Nascimento Gomes (born 4 February 1985) is a Brazilian retired footballer.

== Club career ==
=== Perak ===
In April 2013, Perak signed Rangel on loan from Muangthong United for an undisclosed fee. On 14 April, he scored during his league debut against PKNS in the match that ended draw 2–2. Rangel scored a hat-trick against Johor Darul Ta'zim as Perak won 3–0.

=== Selangor ===
In November 2013, Rangel joined Selangor from Muangthong United. Rangel made his official Selangor debut on their opening matchday of the 2014 season against T-Team at Petaling Jaya Stadium. He scored a brace to help Selangor win 2–0.

On 1 April 2014, Rangel scored his first hat-trick for Selangor against Vietnamese side Hanoi T&T in the 2014 AFC Cup. Rangel scored another hat-trick in the AFC Cup on 23 April 2014 against Maziya from Maldives.

=== Terengganu ===
On 26 November 2014, Rangel signed with Terengganu. Rangel was suspended for 6 months after kicking the ball at a second assistant referee as well as shoving the referee in the Semi Final of Malaysia FA Cup 2015 against LionsXII. After one season playing for Terengganu, Rangel been released from the club.

=== Johor Darul Ta'zim ===
Rangel signed a two-year contract with Johor Darul Ta'zim on 29 December 2015, after becoming a free agent since October. The contract signing ceremony was held at the Tan Sri Dato' Hj Hassan Yunos Stadium in Larkin, Johor Bahru, Malaysia. He replaced the retired Luciano Figueroa, completing the club’s quota of four foreign imports and will link up with new strike partner Jorge Pereyra Díaz. However he was not made any appearances for the club and been demoted to Johor Darul Ta'zim II.

=== Johor Darul Ta'zim II ===
During the pre-season with Johor Darul Ta'zim, Rangel found out it difficult to adapt to club playing style. He was then demoted to Johor Darul Ta'zim II and made his debut in a 1–3 defeat to DRB-Hicom.

=== Londrina ===
For the 2017 season, Rangel returned to Brazil and signed for Londrina.

=== Nakhon Ratchasima ===
Midway through the season, Rangel made a return to Thailand and signed for Nakhon Ratchasima F.C.

=== Kedah FA ===
Rangel signed a 6 months contract for Kedah FA on 23 May 2018. He made his super league debut for Kedah against his former team Selangor FA on 26 May 2018. He scored his first goal for his new side in a 1-0 victory against Kelantan. On 13 July 2018, he missed a penalty against his former side Johor Darul Ta'zim and also earned a red card after kicking former teammate Farizal Marlias.

== Honours ==
Muangthong United

- Thai Premier League: 2012

Tuna Luso

- Campeonato Paraense Second Division: 2020

Individual

- Malaysia Super League Golden Boot: 2014
