= Paulo Henrique (footballer, born 1993) =

Brazilian footballer

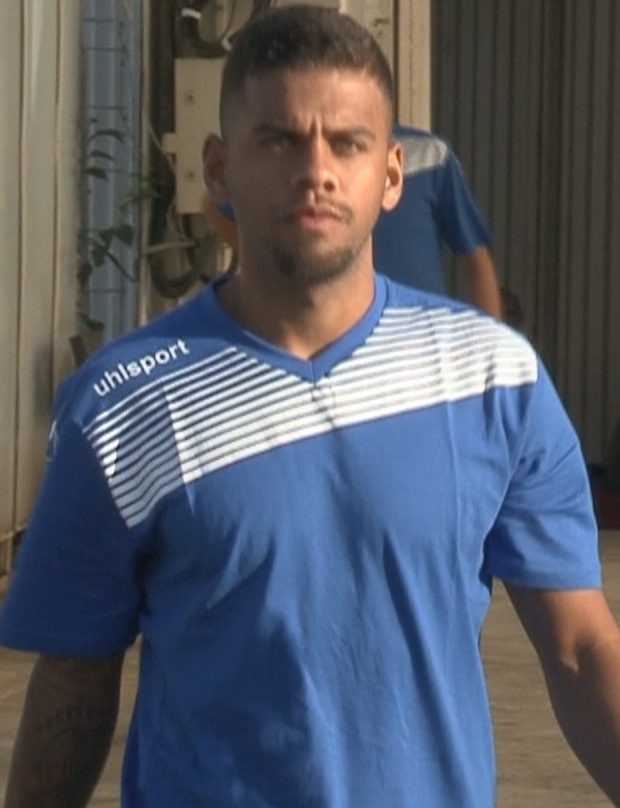

Personal information
- Full name: Paulo Henrique Soares Pereira
- Date of birth: 30 January 1993 (age 33)
- Place of birth: São Paulo, Brazil
- Height: 1.80 m (5 ft 11 in)
- Position: Left-back

Team information
- Current team: São Caetano

Youth career
- Portuguesa
- São Paulo
- 2009–2012: Santos

Senior career*
| Years | Team | Apps | (Gls) |
| 2012–2013 | Santos | 0 | (0) |
| 2014 | Palmeiras | 0 | (0) |
| 2014 | → América de Natal (loan) | 7 | (0) |
| 2015 | Portuguesa | 0 | (0) |
| 2015 | Portimonense | 0 | (0) |
| 2015 | Náutico | 0 | (0) |
| 2016 | Tigres do Brasil | 4 | (0) |
| 2016 | Cherno More | 0 | (0) |
| 2017 | São Bernardo | 2 | (0) |
| 2018 | Santa Cruz | 0 | (0) |
| 2018 | Novoperário | 5 | (0) |
| 2018–2020 | Juventus-SP | 25 | (2) |
| 2020 | Gama | 5 | (0) |
| 2020–2021 | Concórdia | 9 | (0) |
| 2021 | Barra-SC | 0 | (0) |
| 2022 | Remo | 8 | (0) |
| 2022– | São Caetano | 0 | (0) |
- * Club domestic league appearances and goals as of 20:18, 21 November 2022 (UTC)

Paulo Henrique Soares Pereira (born 30 January 1993), known as Paulo Henrique, is a Brazilian footballer who plays as a left-back who plays for São Caetano.

== Club career ==
Born in São Paulo, Paulo Henrique graduated from Santos' youth setup. He made his professional debut on 2 February 2012, against Botafogo-SP for the Campeonato Paulista championship.

On 1 July 2013, after featuring rarely with the first team, and after the signing of Eugenio Mena, Paulo Henrique rescinded with Santos and signed a three-year deal with Rio Ave. However, his deal later collapsed, after he failed medical due to an anterior cruciate ligament injury.

On 28 January 2014 Paulo Henrique signed a one-year deal with Palmeiras. On 21 May, after failing to appear with his new side, he was loaned to América-RN until December.

On 5 January 2015 Paulo Henrique signed for Portuguesa, freshly relegated to Série C.

== Career statistics ==
As of 22 November 2023

| Club | Season | League | | | State League | | Cup | | Continental | | Other | | Total | |
| Club | Season | Division | Apps | Goals | Apps | Goals | Apps | Goals | Apps | Goals | Apps | Goals | Apps | Goals |
|---|---|---|---|---|---|---|---|---|---|---|---|---|---|---|
| Santos | 2012 | Série A | 0 | 0 | 5 | 0 | 0 | 0 | — | | — | | 5 | 0 |
| Santos | 2013 | Série A | 0 | 0 | 0 | 0 | 0 | 0 | — | | — | | 0 | 0 |
| Santos | Total | | 0 | 0 | 5 | 0 | 0 | 0 | — | | — | | 5 | 0 |
| América-RN | 2014 | Série B | 7 | 0 | — | | 3 | 0 | — | | — | | 10 | 0 |
| Portuguesa | 2015 | Série C | 0 | 0 | 12 | 0 | 1 | 0 | — | | — | | 13 | 0 |
| Tigres do Brasil | 2016 | Carioca | — | | 4 | 0 | 0 | 0 | — | | — | | 4 | 0 |
| Cherno More | 2016–17 | First League | 0 | 0 | — | | 0 | 0 | — | | — | | 0 | 0 |
| São Bernardo | 2017 | Série D | 2 | 0 | 5 | 0 | — | | — | | — | | 7 | 0 |
| Santa Cruz | 2018 | Série B | 0 | 0 | 7 | 0 | 1 | 0 | — | | 2 (Note: Appearance(s) in Copa do Nordeste) | 0 | 10 | 0 |
| Novoperário | 2018 | Série D | 5 | 0 | — | | — | | — | | — | | 5 | 0 |
| Juventus-SP | 2018 | Paulista A2 | — | | — | | — | | — | | 11 (Note: Appearance(s) in Copa Paulista) | 0 | 11 | 0 |
| Juventus-SP | 2019 | Paulista A2 | — | | 14 | 2 | — | | — | | 14 | 0 | 28 | 2 |
| Juventus-SP | 2020 | Paulista A2 | — | | 11 | 0 | — | | — | | — | | 11 | 0 |
| Juventus-SP | Total | | — | | 25 | 2 | — | | — | | 25 | 0 | 50 | 2 |
| Gama | 2020 | Série D | 5 | 0 | — | | — | | — | | — | | 5 | 0 |
| Concórdia | 2021 | Catarinense | — | | 9 | 0 | — | | — | | — | | 9 | 0 |
| Remo | 2022 | Série C | — | | 8 | 0 | — | | — | | — | | 8 | 0 |
| São Caetano | 2022 | Paulista A2 | — | | — | | — | | — | | 12 | 0 | 12 | 0 |
| São Caetano | 2023 | Paulista A2 | — | | 13 | 0 | — | | — | | — | | 13 | 0 |
| São Caetano | Total | | — | | 13 | 0 | — | | — | | 12 | 0 | 25 | 0 |
| EC São Bernardo | 2023 | Paulista A3 | — | | — | | — | | — | | 10 | 0 | 10 | 0 |
| Career total | | | 19 | 0 | 88 | 2 | 5 | 0 | 0 | 0 | 49 | 0 | 161 | 2 |
