= Baenão =

Football stadium in Belém, Brazil

Estádio Evandro Almeida
- Baenão
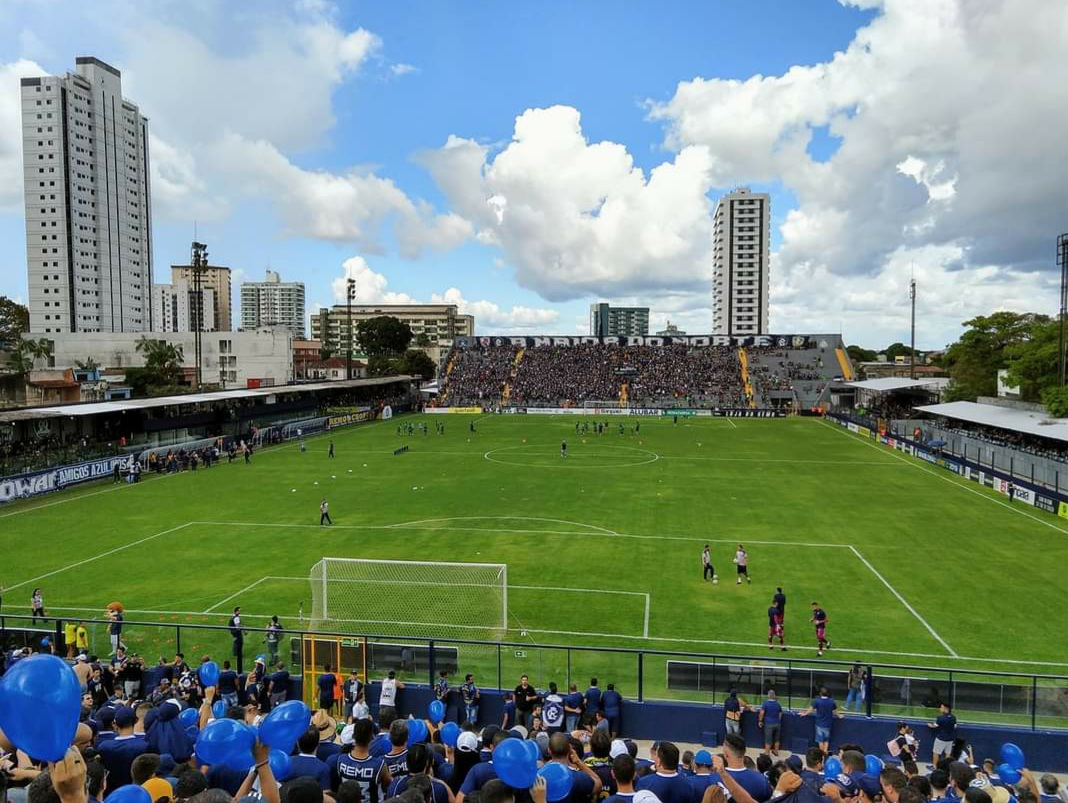
- Sisbrace
- Interactive map of Estádio Evandro Almeida
- Full name: Estádio Evandro Almeida
- Former names: Campo de Esportes do Clube do Remo
- Location: Belém, Pará, Brazil
- Coordinates: 1°26′42″S 48°27′57″W
- Owner: Remo
- Operator: Remo
- Capacity: 13,792
- Surface: Grass
- Record attendance: 33,487 (Remo v Paysandu, 7 September 1976)
- Field size: 105 x 68 m

Construction
- Opened: 15 August 1917
- Renovated: 2019
- Expanded: 2018

Tenant
- Remo

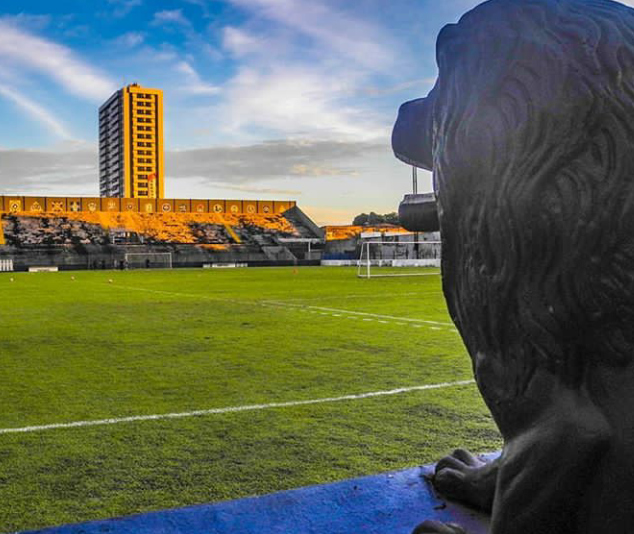
Baenão in 2019

Estádio Evandro Almeida, usually known as Baenão is a stadium in Belém, Brazil. It is currently used mostly for football matches. The stadium has a capacity of 13,792 people. It is owned by Clube do Remo, and named for Evandro Almeida (died 1965), a Remo football player and employee. The nickname Baenão is a reference to the place where the stadium is located, called Travessa Antônio Baena.^{A}

== History ==
On August 15, 1917, which marked the anniversary of a six-year reorganization, Remo opened its football stadium. According to the newspaper A Folha do Norte, August 13, 1917, the field was 110 meters long and 70 meters wide. The stadium consisted of 2,500 people distributed through a grandstand, divided into its extension lines by a superior pavilion that was destined for the families of the partners and the lower part to the partners.

After an extensive schedule that began with a salvo of 21 shots in the morning, was played the inaugural match of the sports plaza between the teams of the Naval Reserve and the selection of Liga Paraense Foot-Ball. The newspapers did not divulge the score of the match, informing only the qualifiers and the referee, Hugo Leão. The first game of Remo in the Baenão was on September 2, 1917, when he beat Panther by 3-1. Dudu, Chermont and Djalma scored Remo's goals that day.

The stadium's attendance record currently stands at 33,487, set on September 7, 1976 when Remo defeated Paysandu 5-2.

=== First reform ===
In 1935, Remo restructured his stadium with larger bleachers. To commemorate the reopening of the stadium, Remus invited Paysandu to a friendly game on 26 May 1935, winning by a score of 5–4.

=== Installation of reflectors ===
On the day he completed his 29 years of reorganization, Remo introduced spotlights for his football stadium. The transformer received from the Pará Elétrica had a high voltage current (2,000 volts), transforming it to 220 volts, which was the voltage received by the grid. The high-voltage input was fitted with a Pellet lightning arrester and the lighting net commanded by a Trumbel three-way wrench, with 250-amp fuses.

=== Interdiction and reopening ===
In 2013, under the management of President Zeca Pirão (born José Wilson Costa Araújo, 1959), an ambitious project was designed to transform the stadium into a modern football arena. The proposed changes included replacing the turf and fence with acrylic plates, installation of a new lighting system, and the construction of a new cabin wing. However, only the first two proposals were met. The area where the stadium's VIP chairs was demolished the following year where the cabins would be built. The illumination system remained uninstalled, and Zeca Pirão's election lost prevented further reform.

On May 1, 2014, Remo beat Independente Tucuruí 4–0 — reversing a 3–0 disadvantage — and qualified for the Campeonato Paraense finals of which they would be champions. This was the last official match played by the Leão in his home, as in the succeeding years, Baenão's structure gradually deteriorated, making him unable to host games valid for official competitions. This was a reflection of the moments of political instability the club was in.

It was then that in 2017, a group of fans decided to take the lead, through the project O Retorno do Rei ao Baenão (The Return of the King to Baenão), which foresaw the return of the stadium after the completion of 10 stages. Shy at first, with resources from sales of cups and revenue from games, the project was gaining strength and supporters, including with the support of the club board. Even with so many difficulties, all the effort was rewarded and, after five years, Baenão was reopened, fulfilling all the demands imposed by CBF. The reopening took place on July 13, 2019, when Remo drew 2–2 with Luverdense, in a match valid for Campeonato Brasileiro Série C.

Travessa Antônio Baena is named for António Ladislau Monteiro Baena (1782-1850), a Portuguese military officer and historian who sided with Brazil at the time of independence, and remained in Brazil after the Independence was declared in 1822.
