= Genílson (footballer, born 1990) =

Brazilian footballer

Personal information
- Full name: Genílson Ventura Mendes de Oliveira
- Date of birth: 27 October 1990 (age 36)
- Place of birth: Duque de Caxias, Brazil
- Height: 1.84 m (6 ft 0 in)
- Position: Centre-back

Team information
- Current team: Porto Vitória

Youth career
- 2007–2009: Tigres do Brasil
- 2010–2012: Vasco da Gama

Senior career*
| Years | Team | Apps | (Gls) |
| 2011–2012 | Vasco da Gama | 0 | (0) |
| 2011 | → Duque de Caxias (loan) | 10 | (0) |
| 2013–2014 | Potiguar de Mossoró | 14 | (1) |
| 2013 | → Boavista-RJ (loan) | 14 | (0) |
| 2014–2015 | Fortaleza | 34 | (2) |
| 2016 | Sampaio Corrêa | 5 | (0) |
| 2016–2017 | Guarani | 35 | (2) |
| 2018 | Santa Cruz | 15 | (0) |
| 2019–2020 | Juventude | 36 | (2) |
| 2021 | São Bernardo FC | 11 | (0) |
| 2021 | Criciúma | 3 | (0) |
| 2022–2023 | Paysandu | 28 | (3) |
| 2023 | ABC | 8 | (0) |
| 2024 | Figueirense | 29 | (0) |
| 2025 | Santa Cruz | 0 | (0) |
| 2025– | Porto Vitória | 3 | (0) |
- * Club domestic league appearances and goals as of 14 October 2025

Genílson Ventura Mendes de Oliveira (born 27 October 1990), simply known as Genílson, is a Brazilian professional footballer who plays as a centre-back for Porto Vitória.

== Career ==
Born in Duque de Caxias, Rio de Janeiro, Genílson began his career in the youth sectors of Tigres do Brasil, arriving in 2010 at Vasco da Gama. As a professional, he debuted on loan at Duque de Caxias FC, and later played for Potiguar de Mossoró, where he was state champion in 2013. In March 2014, Genílson was traded to Fortaleza EC, where he remained until 2015 and again won a state title.

After more discreet spells at Sampaio Corrêa and Guarani, he arrived at Santa Cruz in 2018, and later at EC Juventude, where he became known as the "King of Access", as he was twice promoted from division in the Brazilian Championship. In 2021, he competed in the Campeonato Paulista Série A2 with São Bernardo FC as champion, and in the second half of the year, he played for Criciúma EC.

Genílson played in the 2022 season for Paysandu, winning the Copa Verde that year, and remained until June 2023, when his contract was terminated, playing for ABC for the remainder of the season. In 2024, he was hired by Figueirense, where, due to his strong leadership and experience, became the captain of the team.

For the 2025 season, Genílson signed with Santa Cruz. Without playing, he was later hired by Porto Vitória.

== Honours ==
Potiguar de Mossoró

- Campeonato Potiguar: 2013
- Copa Cidade do Natal: 2013

Fortaleza

- Campeonato Cearense: 2015

São Bernardo FC

- Campeonato Paulista Série A2: 2021

Paysandu

- Copa Verde: 2022
