= Estádio da Curuzu =

Football stadium in Belém, Brazil

- Curuzu
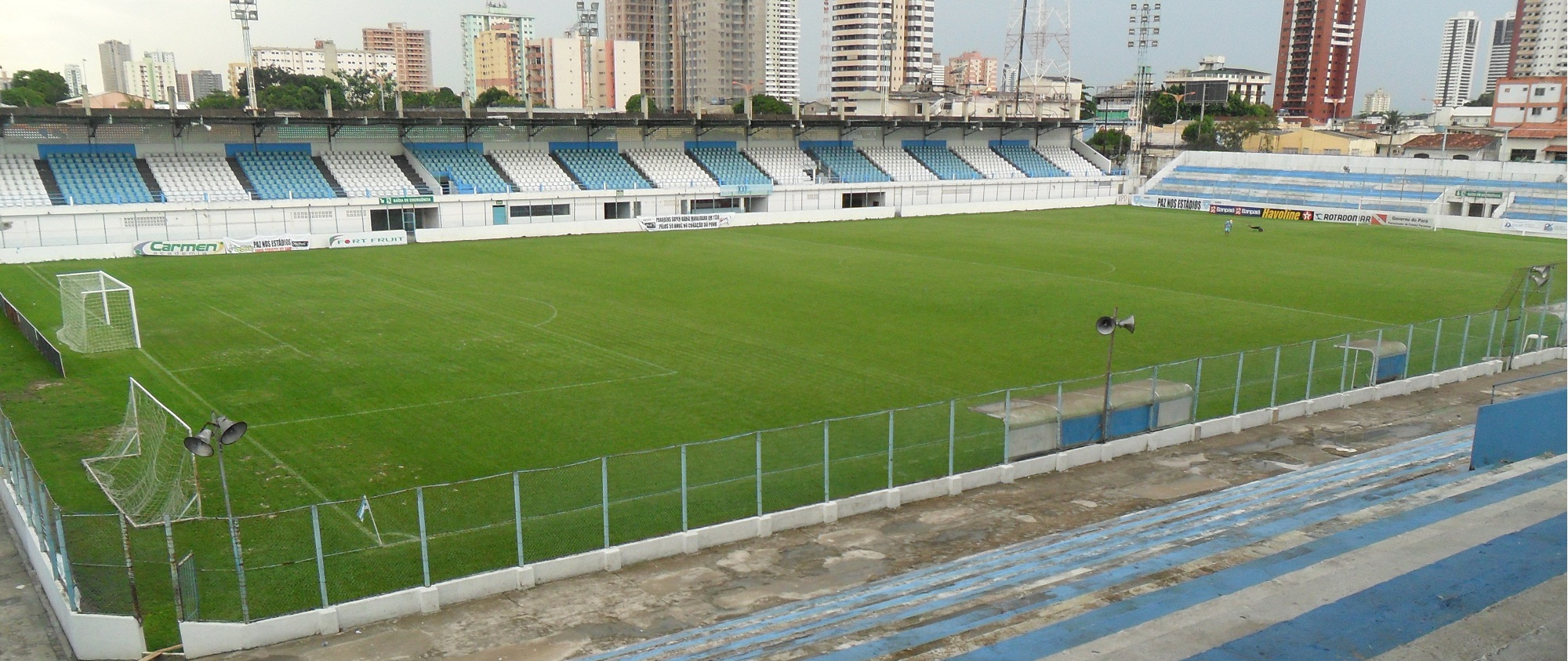
- Sisbrace
- Interactive map of Estádio da Curuzu
- Full name: Estádio Leônidas Sodré de Castro
- Location: Belém, Pará, Brazil
- Coordinates: 1°26′38″S 48°27′46″W
- Owner: Paysandu
- Operator: Paysandu
- Capacity: 16,200
- Surface: Grass
- Record attendance: 18,024 (Paysandu v Avaí, 22 December 2001)
- Field size: 105 x 68 m

Construction
- Opened: 14 June 1914
- Renovated: 2014
- Expanded: 2010

Tenant
- Paysandu

Estádio Leônidas Sodré de Castro, also known as Estádio Leônidas Castro, but usually known as Estádio da Curuzu, is a football stadium owned by Paysandu Sport Club, located in São Braz neighborhood, Belém, Pará, Brazil. The stadium has a maximum capacity of 16,200 people.

The stadium is nicknamed Estádio da Curuzu because it is located near the Curuzu street. Estádio da Curuzu is also nicknamed the Vovô da Cidade (meaning City's Grandpa) because it is the oldest stadium of Pará state.

== History ==
Paysandu acquired the stadium from Empresa Ferreira & Comandita in July 1918, paying 12 contos de réis for it.

On 4 July 1997, one of the quickest goals in a football match was scored at Estádio da Curuzu. In the fourth second of the first half of the match, Vital Filho, of Paysandu, scored a goal against Santa Rosa.

On 22 December 2001, at Estádio da Curuzu, Paysandu beat Avaí, of Santa Catarina state, 4-0, and won the Campeonato Brasileiro Série B, thus being promoted to the following year's first division.

On 28 April 2002, Paysandu beat São Raimundo, of Amazonas state, 3-0 at Estádio da Curuzu, winning the Copa Norte, thus gaining the right to dispute the Copa dos Campeões in the same year.
