= Ricardinho (footballer, born 1985) =

Brazilian footballer

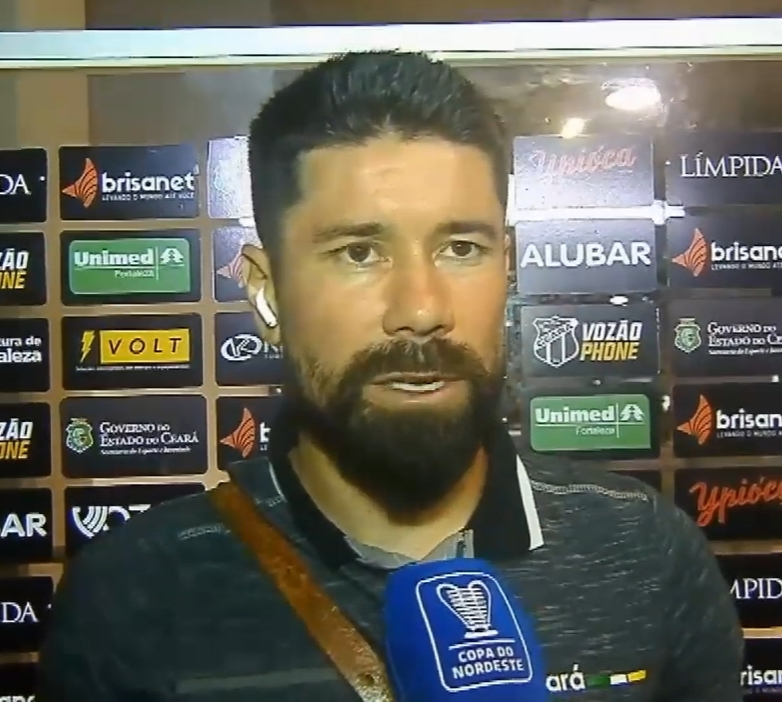

Personal information
- Full name: Ricardo Dias Acosta
- Date of birth: 15 December 1985 (age 40)
- Place of birth: Rosário do Sul, Brazil
- Height: 1.75 m (5 ft 9 in)
- Position: Midfielder

Youth career
- –2005: Juventude

Senior career*
Years	Team	Apps	(Gls)
2006–2009	Iraty		
2007	→ Ceará (loan)	1	(0)
2008	→ Caxias (loan)	10	(1)
2009	→ Linense (loan)	0	(0)
2010	Linense	11	(0)
2011–2012	XV de Piracicaba	43	(10)
2011	→ Londrina (loan)	19	(4)
2012	→ Ponte Preta (loan)	15	(3)
2013–2015	Ceará	79	(11)
2016	Al-Ettifaq	12	(5)
2017–2021	Ceará	159	(9)
2021	Botafogo	19	(0)
2022–2023	Paysandu	0	(0)
2023	Floresta	11	(1)
- * Club domestic league appearances and goals as of 28 November 2021

Ricardo Dias Acosta' (born 15 December 1985), commonly known as Ricardinho, is a former Brazilian football player who played as a midfielder.

== Club career ==
Born in Rosário do Sul, Rio Grande do Sul, Ricardinho finished his formation with Juventude, but made his senior debuts with Iraty in 2006.

Ricardinho was subsequently loaned to Ceará, Caxias and Linense, joining the latter permanently in 2010. In 2011, he moved to XV de Piracicaba.

On 13 May 2011 Ricardinho was loaned to Londrina, returning to Nhô Quim in September. On 9 May of the following year he moved to Ponte Preta, also in a temporary deal.

Ricardinho made his Série A debut on 10 June 2012, coming on as a second-half substitute for Cicinho in a 0–0 away draw against Figueirense. On the 24th he scored his first goal in the category, netting the winner in a 2–1 success at Botafogo.

On 20 December 2012 Ricardinho agreed a deal with Ceará.

== Honours ==
=== Club ===
Paysandu

- Copa Verde: 2022

Botafogo

- Campeonato Brasileiro Série B: 2021

Ceará

- Campeonato Cearense: 2013, 2014
- Copa do Nordeste: 2015

Linense

- Campeonato Paulista Série A2: 2010

XV de Piracicaba

- Campeonato Paulista Série A2: 2011

Londrina

- Campeonato Paranaense Série Prata: 2011

=== Individual ===
- Campeonato Cearense Best right midfielder: 2013
- Copa do Nordeste Best right midfielder: 2014
