= 2020 Clube do Remo season =

2020 season of Brazilian association football team

Remo
2020 season
- President: Fábio Bentes
- Head coach: Rafael Jaques (until 21 February 2020); Mazola Júnior (until 21 September 2020); Paulo Bonamigo
- Stadium: Baenão; Mangueirão
- Campeonato Brasileiro Série C: 2nd (promoted)
- Campeonato Paraense: 2nd
- Copa Verde: Runners-up
- Copa do Brasil: Second round
- Highest home attendance: 19,516 (vs. Tapajós, 19 January 2020)
- Lowest home attendance: 3,654 (vs. Independente, 14 March 2020)
| Home colors | Away colors | Third colors |

Remo played their 107th season in 2020. They participated in the Campeonato Brasileiro Série C, the Campeonato Paraense, the Copa Verde and the Copa do Brasil.

On 15 March 2020, CBF suspended their tournaments indefinitely due to the coronavirus pandemic in Brazil. Eventually on 19 March, the Federação Paraense de Futebol also decided to suspend the Campeonato Paraense.

On 1 July, Campeonato Paraense clubs including Remo made a return to non-contact training, with social distancing rules still in place. The Federação Paraense de Futebol then confirmed a return behind closed doors on 1 August.

Remo finished Campeonato Brasileiro Série C with the runner-up, after losing to Vila Nova by 8–3 in the aggregate, however, he got promoted to Campeonato Brasileiro Série B after 13 years since his last participation in the second national division. The club finished in the 2nd place of the Campeonato Paraense. In the Copa Verde, the club was runner-up after losing the finals by Brasiliense after tied 3–3 on aggregate but lose on penalties by 5–4. In the Copa do Brasil, Remo was eliminated in the second round by Brusque.

== Players ==
=== Squad information ===
Numbers in parentheses denote appearances as substitute.

As of 25 February 2021

| Squad Number | Position | Nat. | Name | Date of Birth (Age) | | |
| Squad Number | Position | Nat. | Name | Date of Birth (Age) | Apps | Goals |
| 1 | GK | BRA | Vinícius | 9 November 1984 (aged 36) | 49 | 0 |
| 2 | DF | BRA | Ricardo Luz | 23 February 1995 (aged 25) | 20 | 0 |
| 2 | DF | BRA | Wellington Silva | 6 March 1988 (aged 32) | 6 | 1 |
| 3 | DF | BRA | Mimica | 22 November 1985 (aged 35) | 28 (4) | 0 |
| 4 | DF | BRA | Rafael Jansen | 3 December 1988 (aged 32) | 40 (1) | 2 |
| 6 | DF | BRA | Marlon | 14 September 1985 (aged 35) | 28 (1) | 1 |
| 8 | MF | BRA | Gelson | 20 January 1994 (aged 27) | 13 (7) | 0 |
| 10 | MF | BRA | Eduardo Ramos | 25 March 1986 (aged 34) | 20 (7) | 8 |
| 11 | FW | BRA | Wallace | 15 December 2000 (aged 20) | 10 (14) | 6 |
| 12 | GK | BRA | Lucas | 11 December 2000 (aged 20) | 0 | 0 |
| 13 | DF | BRA | Davi | 1 May 2002 (aged 18) | 0 (1) | 0 |
| 14 | MF | BRA | Warley | 10 January 2000 (aged 21) | 0 (6) | 0 |
| 15 | FW | BRA | Ronald | 10 August 2002 (aged 18) | 0 (8) | 0 |
| 16 | MF | BRA | Tiago Miranda | 2 August 1999 (aged 21) | 0 (5) | 1 |
| 19 | MF | BRA | Pingo | 29 December 2001 (aged 19) | 8 | 0 |
| 20 | MF | BRA | Carlos Alberto | 10 April 1995 (aged 25) | 10 (14) | 0 |
| 23 | MF | BRA | Lucas Siqueira | 23 September 1988 (aged 32) | 34 | 4 |
| 24 | MF | BRA | Charles | 10 April 1995 (aged 25) | 26 (5) | 2 |
| 27 | FW | BRA | Tcharlles | 11 January 1992 (aged 29) | 24 (2) | 4 |
| 30 | DF | BRA | Kevem | 3 March 2000 (aged 20) | 4 (4) | 1 |
| 35 | FW | BRA | Hélio Borges | 15 May 2000 (aged 20) | 22 (6) | 4 |
| 40 | DF | BRA | Gilberto Alemão | 1 February 1990 (aged 30) | 11 (2) | 1 |
| 66 | DF | BRA | Dudu Mandai | 26 January 1993 (aged 28) | 6 (7) | 0 |
| 73 | FW | BRA | Pepê | 3 May 2002 (aged 18) | 0 (3) | 0 |
| 74 | MF | BRA | Julio Rusch | 22 June 1997 (aged 23) | 13 (10) | 0 |
| 77 | FW | BRA | Eron | 16 July 1998 (aged 22) | 3 (5) | 0 |
| 78 | GK | BRA | Thiago Coelho | 26 May 1995 (aged 25) | 0 | 0 |
| 87 | MF | BRA | Dioguinho | 27 December 1995 (aged 25) | 2 (15) | 0 |
| 90 | DF | BRA | Fredson | 30 November 1991 (aged 29) | 27 (2) | 3 |
| 91 | FW | BRA | Augusto | 10 April 1991 (aged 29) | 8 (6) | 1 |
| 92 | FW | BRA | Salatiel | 20 September 1992 (aged 28) | 10 (3) | 5 |
| 93 | MF | BRA | Felipe Gedoz | 12 July 1993 (aged 27) | 17 (2) | 2 |
| 98 | MF | BRA | Laílson | 1 January 1998 (aged 23) | 10 (11) | 2 |
Players left the club during the playing season
| 2 | DF | BRA | Cesinha | 31 March 1994 (aged 26) | 0 | 0 |
| 5 | MF | BRA | Xaves | 27 February 1986 (aged 34) | 9 (2) | 0 |
| 6 | DF | BRA | Ronaell | 25 November 1991 (aged 28) | 7 | 0 |
| 7 | FW | BRA | Gustavo Ermel | 29 March 1995 (aged 25) | 15 (12) | 4 |
| 8 | MF | BRA | Douglas Packer | 13 March 1987 (aged 33) | 5 (6) | 2 |
| 9 | FW | BRA | Jackson | 7 June 1993 (aged 26) | 8 (1) | 5 |
| 9 | FW | BRA | Zé Carlos | 24 April 1983 (aged 37) | 6 (1) | 2 |
| 9 | FW | BRA | João Diogo | 13 January 1999 (aged 21) | 0 (2) | 0 |
| 11 | FW | BRA | Wesley | 10 February 1993 (aged 27) | 1 (6) | 2 |
| 13 | DF | BRA | Neguete | 3 May 1990 (aged 30) | 4 (2) | 0 |
| 21 | DF | BRA | Everton Castro | 21 February 1994 (aged 26) | 4 (1) | 0 |
| 22 | MF | BRA | Robinho | 28 December 1993 (aged 26) | 7 (8) | 0 |
| 25 | MF | BRA | Djalma | 1 June 1992 (aged 28) | 10 (3) | 0 |
| 75 | DF | BRA | Nininho | 7 February 1992 (aged 28) | 4 | 0 |
| 75 | DF | BRA | Wellisson | 1 March 1999 (aged 21) | 0 | 0 |
| 77 | MF | BRA | Lukinha | 2 April 1997 (aged 23) | 6 (1) | 0 |
| 95 | FW | BRA | Giovane Gomez | 20 March 1995 (aged 25) | 4 (4) | 2 |
| — | MF | BRA | Gustavo Hebling | 5 April 1996 (aged 24) | 0 | 0 |

=== Top scorers ===
As of 25 February 2021

| Place | Position | Name | Campeonato Brasileiro Série C | Campeonato Paraense | Copa Verde | Copa do Brasil | Total |
|---|---|---|---|---|---|---|---|
| 1 | MF | Eduardo Ramos | 3 | 5 | 0 | 0 | 8 |
| 2 | FW | Wallace | 3 | 0 | 3 | 0 | 6 |
| 3 | FW | Salatiel | 5 | 0 | 0 | 0 | 5 |
| 3 | FW | Jackson | 0 | 5 | 0 | 0 | 5 |
| 5 | FW | Tcharlles | 3 | 1 | 0 | 0 | 4 |
| 5 | FW | Hélio Borges | 2 | 0 | 2 | 0 | 4 |
| 5 | FW | Gustavo Ermel | 1 | 2 | 0 | 1 | 4 |
| 5 | MF | Lucas Siqueira | 3 | 0 | 1 | 0 | 4 |
| 9 | DF | Fredson | 1 | 0 | 1 | 1 | 3 |
| 10 | FW | Zé Carlos | 1 | 1 | 0 | 0 | 2 |
| 10 | FW | Giovane Gomez | 0 | 1 | 0 | 1 | 2 |
| 10 | FW | Wesley | 0 | 2 | 0 | 0 | 2 |
| 10 | MF | Felipe Gedoz | 1 | 0 | 1 | 0 | 2 |
| 10 | MF | Charles | 2 | 0 | 0 | 0 | 2 |
| 10 | MF | Laílson | 0 | 0 | 2 | 0 | 2 |
| 10 | MF | Douglas Packer | 0 | 2 | 0 | 0 | 2 |
| 10 | DF | Rafael Jansen | 1 | 0 | 1 | 0 | 2 |
| 18 | FW | Augusto | 1 | 0 | 0 | 0 | 1 |
| 18 | MF | Tiago Miranda | 0 | 0 | 1 | 0 | 1 |
| 18 | DF | Marlon | 1 | 0 | 0 | 0 | 1 |
| 18 | DF | Wellington Silva | 0 | 0 | 1 | 0 | 1 |
| 18 | DF | Gilberto Alemão | 1 | 0 | 0 | 0 | 1 |
| 18 | DF | Kevem | 0 | 0 | 1 | 0 | 1 |
| Own goals | | | 1 | 1 | 0 | 0 | 2 |

=== Disciplinary record ===
As of 19 February 2021

| Position | Name | Campeonato Brasileiro Série C | | Campeonato Paraense | | Copa Verde | | Copa do Brasil | | Total | |
| Position | Name | Booked | Sent off (straight red) | Booked | Sent off (straight red) | Booked | Sent off (straight red) | Booked | Sent off (straight red) | Booked | Sent off (straight red) |
| DF | Fredson | 3 | 1 | 5 | 2 | 0 | 0 | 1 | 0 | 9 | 3 |
| DF | Marlon | 6 | 1 | 2 | 0 | 1 | 0 | 0 | 0 | 9 | 1 |
| MF | Charles | 4 | 1 | 3 | 0 | 0 | 0 | 0 | 0 | 7 | 1 |
| MF | Laílson | 1 | 0 | 2 | 1 | 1 | 0 | 2 | 0 | 6 | 1 |
| FW | Hélio Borges | 4 | 1 | 0 | 0 | 0 | 0 | 0 | 0 | 4 | 1 |
| FW | Tcharlles | 8 | 0 | 0 | 0 | 1 | 0 | 0 | 0 | 9 | 0 |
| DF | Rafael Jansen | 3 | 0 | 2 | 0 | 1 | 0 | 0 | 0 | 6 | 0 |
| DF | Mimica | 3 | 0 | 1 | 0 | 1 | 0 | 0 | 0 | 5 | 0 |
| DF | Ronaell | 0 | 0 | 3 | 0 | 0 | 0 | 2 | 0 | 5 | 0 |
| MF | Lucas Siqueira | 3 | 0 | 0 | 0 | 1 | 0 | 0 | 0 | 4 | 0 |
| MF | Gelson | 2 | 0 | 3 | 0 | 0 | 0 | 0 | 0 | 5 | 0 |
| FW | Wallace | 2 | 0 | 1 | 0 | 1 | 0 | 0 | 0 | 4 | 0 |
| DF | Ricardo Luz | 2 | 0 | 0 | 0 | 1 | 0 | 0 | 0 | 3 | 0 |
| MF | Xaves | 0 | 0 | 3 | 0 | 0 | 0 | 0 | 0 | 3 | 0 |
| MF | Djalma | 0 | 0 | 2 | 0 | 0 | 0 | 1 | 0 | 3 | 0 |
| FW | Zé Carlos | 2 | 0 | 1 | 0 | 0 | 0 | 0 | 0 | 3 | 0 |
| DF | Gilberto Alemão | 2 | 0 | 0 | 0 | 0 | 0 | 0 | 0 | 2 | 0 |
| DF | Wellington Silva | 0 | 0 | 0 | 0 | 2 | 0 | 0 | 0 | 2 | 0 |
| DF | Dudu Mandai | 2 | 0 | 0 | 0 | 0 | 0 | 0 | 0 | 2 | 0 |
| DF | Neguete | 0 | 0 | 1 | 0 | 0 | 0 | 1 | 0 | 2 | 0 |
| DF | Nininho | 0 | 0 | 2 | 0 | 0 | 0 | 0 | 0 | 2 | 0 |
| MF | Julio Rusch | 1 | 0 | 1 | 0 | 0 | 0 | 0 | 0 | 2 | 0 |
| MF | Carlos Alberto | 2 | 0 | 0 | 0 | 0 | 0 | 0 | 0 | 2 | 0 |
| MF | Eduardo Ramos | 2 | 0 | 0 | 0 | 0 | 0 | 0 | 0 | 2 | 0 |
| MF | Lukinha | 0 | 0 | 2 | 0 | 0 | 0 | 0 | 0 | 2 | 0 |
| FW | Salatiel | 1 | 0 | 0 | 0 | 1 | 0 | 0 | 0 | 2 | 0 |
| GK | Vinícius | 1 | 0 | 0 | 0 | 0 | 0 | 1 | 0 | 2 | 0 |
| DF | Kevem | 1 | 0 | 0 | 0 | 0 | 0 | 0 | 0 | 1 | 0 |
| MF | Felipe Gedoz | 0 | 0 | 0 | 0 | 1 | 0 | 0 | 0 | 1 | 0 |
| MF | Robinho | 0 | 0 | 1 | 0 | 0 | 0 | 0 | 0 | 1 | 0 |
| FW | Eron | 1 | 0 | 0 | 0 | 0 | 0 | 0 | 0 | 1 | 0 |
| FW | Gustavo Ermel | 1 | 0 | 0 | 0 | 0 | 0 | 0 | 0 | 1 | 0 |
| FW | Augusto | 1 | 0 | 0 | 0 | 0 | 0 | 0 | 0 | 1 | 0 |
| FW | João Diogo | 1 | 0 | 0 | 0 | 0 | 0 | 0 | 0 | 1 | 0 |
| FW | Wesley | 0 | 0 | 1 | 0 | 0 | 0 | 0 | 0 | 1 | 0 |
| | TOTALS | 60 | 4 | 36 | 3 | 12 | 0 | 8 | 0 | 115 | 7 |

== Kit ==
Supplier: Kappa / Main sponsor: Banpará

| Home | Home alt. 1 | Away | Away alt. 1 | Away alt. 2 | Third | Special | Special alt. 1 | Special alt. 2 |

== Transfers ==
=== Transfers in ===
| Position | Name | From | Type | Source |
|---|---|---|---|---|
| MF | Lukinha | (Brazil) Bragantino-PA | Transfer | |
| MF | Xaves | (Brazil) Imperatriz | Transfer | |
| DF | Dudu Mandai | (Brazil) São José | Transfer | |
| FW | Giovane Gomez | (Brazil) Pelotas | Transfer | |
| FW | Jackson | (Brazil) Ypiranga | Transfer | |
| MF | Robinho | (Brazil) Operário Ferroviário | Loan | |
| FW | Gustavo Ermel | (Brazil) Atlético Tubarão | Transfer | |
| MF | Charles | (Brazil) Santa Cruz | Transfer | |
| DF | Neguete | (Portugal) Vilafranquense | Transfer | |
| MF | Douglas Packer | (Malta) Valletta | Transfer | |
| MF | Gelson | (Brazil) Operário Ferroviário | Transfer | |
| DF | Nininho | (Portugal) Paços de Ferreira | Transfer | |
| FW | Zé Carlos | (Brazil) São Bernardo | Transfer | |
| DF | Everton Castro | (Brazil) Sampaio Corrêa | Transfer | |
| DF | Kevem | (Brazil) Mirassol | Loan | |
| MF | Julio Rusch | (Brazil) Coritiba | Loan | |
| MF | Lucas Siqueira | (Brazil) Portuguesa | Transfer | |
| DF | Gilberto Alemão | (Brazil) XV de Piracicaba | Transfer | |
| DF | Marlon | (Brazil) Santo André | Transfer | |
| FW | Tcharlles | (Brazil) Inter de Limeira | Loan | |
| MF | Dioguinho | (Brazil) Castanhal | Transfer | |
| MF | Gustavo Hebling | (Brazil) CSA | Transfer | |
| DF | Ricardo Luz | (Brazil) Santo André | Transfer | |
| FW | João Diogo | (Brazil) CRB | Loan | |
| DF | Wellisson | (Brazil) Vitória | Loan | |
| FW | Eron | (Brazil) Vitória | Loan | |
| FW | Salatiel | (Brazil) Náutico | Loan | |
| MF | Felipe Gedoz | (Uruguay) Nacional | Loan | |
| FW | Augusto | (Brazil) América de Natal | Transfer | |

=== Transfers out ===
| Position | Name | To | Type | Source |
|---|---|---|---|---|
| FW | Neto Baiano | (Brazil) Brasiliense | Transfer | |
| MF | Yuri | (Brazil) Caxias | Transfer | |
| DF | Cesinha | (Brazil) Uberlândia | Loan | |
| FW | Jackson | (Brazil) Sampaio Corrêa | Rescission | |
| DF | Nininho | (Brazil) Portuguesa | Rescission | |
| FW | Wesley | (Brazil) Villa Nova | Rescission | |
| MF | Lukinha | (Brazil) Ipatinga | Rescission | |
| DF | Cesinha | (Brazil) Manaus | Rescission | |
| DF | Ronaell | (Brazil) Brusque | Transfer | |
| FW | Giovane Gomez | (Brazil) Caxias | Rescission | |
| MF | Xaves | (Brazil) América de Natal | Rescission | |
| DF | Neguete | (Brazil) Rio Branco-ES | Rescission | |
| FW | Zé Carlos | Free agent | Rescission | |
| MF | Douglas Packer | (Brazil) Treze | Rescission | |
| MF | Robinho | (Brazil) Operário Ferroviário | Loan return | |
| MF | Gustavo Hebling | (Brazil) XV de Piracicaba | Rescission | |
| DF | Everton Castro | Free agent | End of contract | |
| MF | Pingo | (Brazil) Pinheirense | Loan | |
| DF | Wellisson | (Brazil) Vitória | Loan return | |
| MF | Djalma | Free agent | Rescission | |
| FW | João Diogo | (Brazil) CRB | Loan return | |
| FW | Gustavo Ermel | (Brazil) Joinville | Rescission | |

Notes

1. Yuri joined Caxias following his release.
2. Neto Baiano joined Brasiliense following his release.
3. Ronaell joined Brusque following his release.
4. Following Jackson's release, he later signed for Sampaio Corrêa.
5. Following Nininho's release, he later signed for Portuguesa.
6. Following Wesley's release, he later signed for Villa Nova.
7. Following Lukinha's release, he later signed for Ipatinga.
8. Following Cesinha's release, he later signed for Manaus.
9. Giovane Gomez joined Caxias following his release.
10. Douglas Packer joined Treze following his release.
11. Following Xaves release, he later signed for América de Natal.
12. Following Neguete's release, he later signed for Rio Branco-ES.
13. Following Gustavo Hebling's release, he later signed for XV de Piracicaba.
14. Gustavo Ermel joined Joinville following his release.

== Competitions ==
| Competition | First match | Last match | Starting round | Final position | Record | | | | | | | |
| Competition | First match | Last match | Starting round | Final position | Pld | W | D | L | GF | GA | GD | Win % |
|---|---|---|---|---|---|---|---|---|---|---|---|---|
| Campeonato Brasileiro Série C | 9 August 2020 | 30 January 2021 | First stage | 2nd | 26 | 11 | 8 | 7 | 30 | 23 | +7 | 42.31 |
| Campeonato Paraense | 19 January 2020 | 6 September 2020 | Group stage | 2nd | 14 | 9 | 2 | 3 | 20 | 11 | +9 | 64.29 |
| Copa Verde | 27 January 2021 | 24 February 2021 | Round of 16 | Runners-up | 7 | 4 | 1 | 2 | 14 | 9 | +5 | 57.14 |
| Copa do Brasil | 12 February 2020 | 20 February 2020 | First round | Second round | 2 | 1 | 0 | 1 | 3 | 6 | −3 | 50.00 |
| Total | | | | | 49 | 25 | 11 | 13 | 67 | 49 | +18 | 51.02 |

Source: Competitions

=== Campeonato Brasileiro Série C ===
Win Draw Loss

==== First stage ====
| Pos | Team | Pld | W | D | L | GF | GA | GD | Pts | Qualification or relegation |
|---|---|---|---|---|---|---|---|---|---|---|
| 1 | Santa Cruz | 18 | 11 | 4 | 3 | 32 | 16 | +16 | 37 | Advance to second stage |
| 2 | Remo | 18 | 8 | 7 | 3 | 20 | 10 | +10 | 31 | Advance to second stage |
| 3 | Vila Nova | 18 | 8 | 7 | 3 | 20 | 11 | +9 | 31 | Advance to second stage |
| 4 | Paysandu | 18 | 8 | 5 | 5 | 25 | 14 | +11 | 29 | Advance to second stage |
| 5 | Manaus | 18 | 6 | 8 | 4 | 19 | 18 | +1 | 26 | |

Source: CBF
Rules for classification: 1) points; 2) wins; 3) goal difference; 4) goals scored; 5) head-to-head results (only between 2 teams); 6) fewest red cards; 7) fewest yellow cards; 8) draw.

===== Matches =====
| 9 August 2020 1 | Jacuipense | 1–2 | Remo | Riachão do Jacuípe |
| 18:00 UTC−3 | Eudair 9'; Lucas (yellow card) 14'; Matheus (yellow card) 54' | Report | Lucas Siqueira (yellow card) 33', (goal) 48'; Rafael Jansen (yellow card) 69'; Fredson (yellow card) 79'; Marlon (red card) 90'; Eduardo Ramos 90+4' | Stadium: Valfredão; Attendance: 0 Referee: José Wellington Bandeira |
Note: The match was postponed due to the COVID-19 pandemic in Brazil, and rescheduled to 9 August.

| 16 August 2020 2 | Remo | 2–1 | Ferroviário | Belém |
| 18:00 UTC−3 | Charles (yellow card) 13' (yellow-red card) 37'; Zé Carlos (yellow card) 16'; Dudu Mandai (yellow card) 29'; Fredson 63'; Eduardo Ramos 73' | Report | Lucas Hulk (yellow card) 16'; Wellington Rato 77' (pen.); Willian Machado (yellow card) 87'; Júnior Batista (yellow card) 89' | Stadium: Mangueirão; Attendance: 0 Referee: Leandro Bizzio Marinho |
Note: The match was postponed due to the COVID-19 pandemic in Brazil, and rescheduled to 16 August.

| 24 August 2020 3 | Imperatriz | 0–0 | Remo | Imperatriz |
| 20:00 UTC−3 | Ramón (yellow card) 79' | Report | Rafael Jansen (yellow card) 84'; Carlos Alberto (yellow card) 86' | Stadium: Estádio Frei Epifânio D'Abadia; Attendance: 0 Referee: Maguielson Lima Barbosa |
Note: The match was postponed due to the COVID-19 pandemic in Brazil, and rescheduled to 24 August.

| 30 August 2020 4 | Remo | 0–0 | Vila Nova | Belém |
| 18:00 UTC−3 | Mimica (yellow card) 25' | Report | Dudu Pacheco (yellow card) 51'; Rodrigo Alves (yellow card) 83' | Stadium: Mangueirão; Attendance: 0 Referee: Valdicleuson Silva da Costa |
Note: The match was postponed due to the COVID-19 pandemic in Brazil, and rescheduled to 30 August.

| 10 September 2020 5 | Treze | 2–2 | Remo | Campina Grande |
| 20:00 UTC−3 | Robson (yellow card) 46' (yellow-red card) 67'; Rafael Jansen 55' (o.g.); Frontini 73', (yellow card) 85'; Vinícius Barba (yellow card) 84'; Douglas Lima (yellow card) 90+1'; Caxito (yellow card) 90+4' | Report | Zé Carlos 5'; Lucas Siqueira (yellow card) 41'; Tcharlles (yellow card) 53'; Kevem (yellow card) 66'; Charles 86' | Stadium: Amigão; Attendance: 0 Referee: Luiz Cláudio Sobral |
Note: The match was postponed due to the COVID-19 pandemic in Brazil, and rescheduled to 10 September.

| 13 September 2020 6 | Santa Cruz | 1–0 | Remo | Recife |
| 18:00 UTC−3 | Augusto Potiguar (yellow card) 67'; Elivélton 68'; Maycon (yellow card) 86'; Bileu (yellow card) 87'; Negueba (yellow card) 90+4' | Report | Gelson (yellow card) 20'; Zé Carlos (yellow card) 49' | Stadium: Estádio do Arruda; Attendance: 0 Referee: Diego da Silva Castro |
Note: The match was postponed due to the COVID-19 pandemic in Brazil, and rescheduled to 13 September.

| 20 September 2020 7 | Remo | 0–0 | Botafogo-PB | Belém |
| 18:00 UTC−3 | Gilberto Alemão (yellow card) 11'; Tcharlles (yellow card) 25'; Fredson (yellow card) 47'; Eduardo Ramos (yellow card) 74' | Report | Donato (yellow card) 19' (yellow-red card) 81'; Marcos Martins (yellow card) 46' | Stadium: Mangueirão; Attendance: 0 Referee: Alinor Silva da Paixão |
Note: The match was postponed due to the COVID-19 pandemic in Brazil, and rescheduled to 20 September.

| 27 September 2020 8 | Remo | 1–0 | Manaus | Belém |
| 18:00 UTC−3 | Marlon (yellow card) 57'; Tcharlles (yellow card) 76'; Wallace 80' | Report | Patrick (yellow card) 58'; Matheuzinho (yellow card) 79'; Luizinho (red card) 83'; Thiago Spice (yellow card) 90' | Stadium: Mangueirão; Attendance: 0 Referee: Tiago Nascimento dos Santos |
Note: The match was postponed due to the COVID-19 pandemic in Brazil, and rescheduled to 27 September.

| 3 October 2020 9 | Paysandu | 2–3 | Remo | Belém |
| 19:00 UTC−3 | Uilliam (yellow card) 55'; Luiz Felipe (yellow card) 69'; Nicolas (yellow card) 81', (goal) 87'; Wesley Matos 82'; Diego Matos (yellow card) 84'; Victor Diniz (yellow card) 87' | Report | Gustavo Ermel (yellow card) 43'; Hélio Borges 53', (yellow card) 71'; João Diogo (yellow card) 53'; Marlon 62', (yellow card) 90+4'; Wallace (yellow card) 83', (goal) 89' | Stadium: Mangueirão; Attendance: 0 Referee: Vinícius Furlan |
Note: The match was postponed due to the COVID-19 pandemic in Brazil, and rescheduled to 3 October.

| 10 October 2020 10 | Remo | 2–0 | Jacuipense | Belém |
| 19:00 UTC−3 | Charles 58'; Wallace 63'; Laílson (yellow card) 90+2' | Report | Danilo Rios (yellow card) 53'; Railon (yellow card) 57'; Raniele (yellow card) 72' | Stadium: Mangueirão; Attendance: 0 Referee: José Ricardo Vasconcellos Laranjeira |
Note: The match was postponed due to the COVID-19 pandemic in Brazil, and rescheduled to 10 October.

| 17 October 2020 11 | Ferroviário | 1–0 | Remo | Fortaleza |
| 17:00 UTC−3 | Siloé (yellow card) 8'; Wesley 50', (yellow card) 77'; Gabriel Cassimiro (yellow card) 70'; Genivaldo (yellow card) 74' | Report | Gelson (yellow card) 21'; Wallace (yellow card) 36' | Stadium: Arena Castelão; Attendance: 0 Referee: Francisco Carlos do Nascimento |
Note: The match was postponed due to the COVID-19 pandemic in Brazil, and rescheduled to 17 October.

| 24 October 2020 12 | Remo | 5–0 | Imperatriz | Belém |
| 19:00 UTC−3 | Tcharlles 6', 36' (yellow card) 52'; Eduardo Ramos 25'; Hélio Borges 45'; Gustavo Ermel 68' | Report | Tomais (yellow card) 67'; Cesinha (yellow card) 86' | Stadium: Mangueirão; Attendance: 0 Referee: Carlos Eduardo Nunes Braga |
Note: The match was postponed due to the COVID-19 pandemic in Brazil, and rescheduled to 24 October.

| 1 November 2020 13 | Vila Nova | 0–0 | Remo | Goiânia |
| 18:00 UTC−3 | Pablo Roberto (yellow card) 74'; Rafael Donato (yellow card) 74'; Francis (yellow card) 90+2' | Report | Marlon (yellow card) 25'; Rafael Jansen (yellow card) 68'; Tcharlles (yellow card) 90+2' | Stadium: Estádio Onésio Brasileiro Alvarenga; Attendance: 0 Referee: Ilbert Estevam da Silva |
Note: The match was postponed due to the COVID-19 pandemic in Brazil, and rescheduled to 1 November.

| 8 November 2020 14 | Remo | 1–0 | Treze | Belém |
| 18:00 UTC−3 | Salatiel 11' (pen.); Mimica (yellow card) 35'; Tcharlles (yellow card) 62'; Ricardo Luz (yellow card) 90+4' | Report | Gilvan (yellow card) 5' | Stadium: Mangueirão; Attendance: 0 Referee: Rodrigo Batista Raposo |
Note: The match was postponed due to the COVID-19 pandemic in Brazil, and rescheduled to 8 November.

| 13 November 2020 15 | Remo | 0–2 | Santa Cruz | Belém |
| 20:00 UTC−3 | Hélio Borges (yellow card) 45' (yellow-red card) 63' | Report | Jeremias 58'; Caio Mancha 90' (pen.) | Stadium: Mangueirão; Attendance: 0 Referee: Rafael Martins de Sá |
Note: The match was postponed due to the COVID-19 pandemic in Brazil, and rescheduled to 13 November.

| 23 November 2020 16 | Botafogo-PB | 0–0 | Remo | João Pessoa |
| 20:00 UTC−3 | | Report | Eron (yellow card) 44'; Marlon (yellow card) 90+3' | Stadium: Almeidão; Attendance: 0 Referee: Thiago Duarte Peixoto |
Note: The match was postponed due to the COVID-19 pandemic in Brazil, and rescheduled to 23 November.

| 28 November 2020 17 | Manaus | 0–2 | Remo | Manaus |
| 19:00 UTC−3 | Luís Fernando (yellow card) 5'; Tsunami (yellow card) 19'; Hamilton (yellow card) 44'; Rennan (yellow card) 73'; Paulinho Simionato (yellow card) 84'; Matheuzinho (yellow card) 84' | Report | Fredson (yellow card) 5'; Marlon (yellow card) 7'; Salatiel 48'; Tcharlles 50' | Stadium: Arena da Amazônia; Attendance: 0 Referee: Jonathan Antero Silva |
Note: The match was postponed due to the COVID-19 pandemic in Brazil, and rescheduled to 28 November.

| 5 December 2020 18 | Remo | 0–0 | Paysandu | Belém |
| 17:00 UTC−3 | | Report | | Stadium: Mangueirão; Attendance: 0 Referee: Paulo Roberto Alves Júnior |
Note: The match was postponed due to the COVID-19 pandemic in Brazil, and rescheduled to 5 December.

==== Second stage ====
| Pos | Team | Pld | W | D | L | GF | GA | GD | Pts | Qualification |
|---|---|---|---|---|---|---|---|---|---|---|
| 1 | Remo (P) | 6 | 3 | 1 | 2 | 7 | 5 | +2 | 10 | Advance to Finals and promoted to 2021 Campeonato Brasileiro Série B |
| 2 | Londrina (P) | 6 | 2 | 3 | 1 | 7 | 6 | +1 | 9 | Promoted to 2021 Campeonato Brasileiro Série B |
| 3 | Ypiranga | 6 | 2 | 1 | 3 | 8 | 9 | −1 | 7 | |
| 4 | Paysandu | 6 | 2 | 1 | 3 | 6 | 8 | −2 | 7 | |

Source: CBF
Rules for classification: 1) points; 2) wins; 3) goal difference; 4) goals scored; 5) head-to-head results (only between 2 teams); 6) fewest red cards; 7) fewest yellow cards; 8) draw.
(P) Promoted

===== Matches =====
| 12 December 2020 1 | Londrina | 0–0 | Remo | Londrina |
| 17:00 UTC−3 | Samuel Gomes (yellow card) 75' | Report | Ricardo Luz (yellow card) 7'; Dudu Mandai (yellow card) 69' | Stadium: Estádio do Café; Attendance: 0 Referee: Dênis da Silva Ribeiro Serafim |

| 20 December 2020 2 | Remo | 3–1 | Paysandu | Belém |
| 18:00 UTC−3 | Hélio Borges (yellow card) 2'; Paulo Ricardo 15' (o.g.); Julio Rusch (yellow card) 45+1'; Carlos Alberto (yellow card) 49'; Mimica (yellow card) 55'; Augusto 62', (yellow card) 63'; Salatiel (yellow card) 67'; Rafael Jansen 71' | Report | Nicolas 5'; Serginho (red card) 21'; Perema (yellow card) 34' | Stadium: Mangueirão; Attendance: 0 Referee: Felipe Fernandes de Lima |

| 27 December 2020 3 | Remo | 2–1 | Ypiranga | Belém |
| 18:00 UTC−3 | Charles (yellow card) 61'; Salatiel 68', 76'; Vinícius (yellow card) 86'; Fredson (red card) 89' | Report | Tárik 60', (yellow card) 73'; Cristiano (yellow card) 71'; Douglas (yellow card) 78' | Stadium: Mangueirão; Attendance: 0 Referee: Rodrigo D'Alonso Ferreira |

| 3 January 2021 4 | Ypiranga | 2–1 | Remo | Erechim |
| 20:00 UTC−3 | Luís Eduardo 33'; Cristiano 74' | Report | Lucas Siqueira 4'; Gilberto Alemão (yellow card) 85' | Stadium: Estádio Olímpico Colosso da Lagoa; Attendance: 0 Referee: Vinícius Furlan |

| 10 January 2021 5 | Paysandu | 0–1 | Remo | Belém |
| 18:00 UTC−3 | Carlão (yellow card) 90+2' | Report | Salatiel 34'; Marlon (yellow card) 62' | Stadium: Mangueirão; Attendance: 0 Referee: Wilton Sampaio |

| 16 January 2021 6 | Remo | 0–1 | Londrina | Belém |
| 17:00 UTC−3 | | Report | Elias Bidía (yellow card) 35'; Gedeílson (yellow card) 82'; Gilberto Alemão 87' (o.g.) | Stadium: Mangueirão; Attendance: 0 Referee: Luiz Flávio de Oliveira |

==== Finals ====
| 23 January 2021 First leg | Vila Nova | 5–1 | Remo | Goiânia |
| 17:00 UTC−3 | Talles 25', 36'; Alan Mineiro 45+2'; Fabrício (yellow card) 52'; Henan 58', 69'; Éder (yellow card) 90+1' | Report | Gilberto Alemão 9'; Lucas Siqueira (yellow card) 45'; Eduardo Ramos (yellow card) 59'; Tcharlles (yellow card) 59' | Stadium: Estádio Onésio Brasileiro Alvarenga; Attendance: 0 Referee: Caio Max Augusto Vieira |

| 30 January 2021 Second leg | Remo | 2–3 (3–8 agg.) | Vila Nova | Belém |
| 17:00 UTC−3 | Felipe Gedoz 7'; Lucas Siqueira 35'; Tcharlles (yellow card) 45'; Charles (yellow card) 45+1' | Report | Alan Mineiro 9'; Rafael Donato (yellow card) 34'; Mimica 40' (o.g.), 88' (o.g.); Adalberto (yellow card) 60'; Yuri (yellow card) 82' | Stadium: Mangueirão; Attendance: 0 Referee: Ramon Abatti |

=== Campeonato Paraense ===
Win Draw Loss

==== Group stage ====
| Pos | Team | Pld | W | D | L | GF | GA | GD | Pts | Qualification or relegation |
|---|---|---|---|---|---|---|---|---|---|---|
| 1 | Paysandu | 10 | 8 | 1 | 1 | 25 | 7 | +18 | 25 | Advance to Final stage |
| 2 | Remo | 10 | 7 | 2 | 1 | 16 | 8 | +8 | 23 | Advance to Final stage |
| 3 | Castanhal | 10 | 6 | 2 | 2 | 21 | 15 | +6 | 20 | Advance to Final stage |
| 4 | Paragominas | 10 | 5 | 1 | 4 | 17 | 16 | +1 | 16 | Advance to Final stage |
| 5 | Bragantino | 10 | 5 | 1 | 4 | 10 | 10 | 0 | 16 | |

Updated to match(es) played on 5 August 2020. Source: Globo Esporte

===== Matches =====
| 19 January 2020 1 | Remo | 1–0 | Tapajós | Belém |
| 16:00 UTC−3 | Laílson (yellow card) 31'; Rafael Jansen (yellow card) 47'; Xaves (yellow card) 87'; Wesley 90+5' | Report | Arian Taperaçu (yellow card) 15'; Henrique (yellow card) 55'; Jerferson Monte Alegre (yellow card) 71' | Stadium: Mangueirão; Attendance: 19,516; Referee: Joelson Nazareno Ferreira Cardoso |

| 26 January 2020 2 | Carajás | 0–1 | Remo | Belém |
| 16:00 UTC−3 | Caio Rex (yellow card) 44'; Dodô (yellow card) 45' (yellow-red card) 90+2'; Pulga (yellow card) 56'; Marcelo Maciel (yellow card) 88' | Report | Fredson (yellow card) 35'; Jackson 50'; Laílson (yellow card) 63'; Ronaell (yellow card) 75' | Stadium: Mangueirão; Attendance: 7,809; Referee: Andrey da Silva e Silva |

| 1 February 2020 3 | Independente | 1–2 | Remo | Belém |
| 17:00 UTC−3 | Leandro Cabecinha 69' (pen.); Evair (yellow card) 90+6' | Report | Jackson 4'; Ronaell (yellow card) 19'; Wesley 66', (yellow card) 84'; Charles (yellow card) 90+4' | Stadium: Mangueirão; Attendance: 3,763; Referee: Djonaltan Costa de Araújo |

| 9 February 2020 4 | Remo | 1–2 | Paysandu | Belém |
| 16:00 UTC−3 | Charles (yellow card) 31'; Robinho (yellow card) 33'; Jackson 43'; Ronaell (yellow card) 56' | Report | Perema (yellow card) 16'; Wesley Matos (yellow card) 24'; Nicolas 31'; Serginho (yellow card) 33'; Uilliam 63' (pen.); Netinho (yellow card) 81'; Paulo Ricardo (yellow card) 86'; Anderson Uchôa (yellow card) 87'; Bruno Collaço (yellow card) 90+3'; Alex Maranhão (yellow card) 90+4' | Stadium: Mangueirão; Attendance: 26,152; Referee: Luiz Flávio de Oliveira |

| 15 February 2020 5 | Águia de Marabá | 0–1 | Remo | Belém |
| 16:00 UTC−3 | Tiago Félix (yellow card) 16'; Matheus Paixão (yellow card) 90+1' | Report | Giovane Gomez 27'; Gelson (yellow card) 35'; Lukinha (yellow card) 50'; Nininho (yellow card) 58' | Stadium: Mangueirão; Attendance: 1,526; Referee: Andrey da Silva e Silva |

| 1 March 2020 6 | Remo | 2–1 | Carajás | Belém |
| 10:00 UTC−3 | Charles (yellow card) 1'; Fredson (red card) 41'; Djalma (yellow card) 45+1'; Nininho (yellow card) 52'; Lukinha (yellow card) 54'; Jackson 57' (pen.), 68' | Report | Ramon (yellow card) 17'; Pedrinho 40', (red card) 41'; Souza (yellow card) 64'; Pulga (yellow card) 79' | Stadium: Baenão; Attendance: 8,766; Referee: Djonaltan Costa de Araújo |

| 8 March 2020 7 | Paysandu | 1–1 | Remo | Belém |
| 17:00 UTC−3 | Nicolas 19', (yellow card) 70'; Serginho (yellow card) 45'; Caíque Oliveira (yellow card) 52' | Report | Mimica (yellow card) 29'; Eduardo Ramos 34'; Neguete (yellow card) 47'; Xaves (yellow card) 72'; Laílson (red card) 84'; Djalma (yellow card) 84' | Stadium: Mangueirão; Attendance: 21,798; Referee: Wagner do Nascimento Magalhães |

| 14 March 2020 8 | Remo | 0–0 | Independente | Belém |
| 15:30 UTC−3 | Gelson (yellow card) 66' | Report | Jeferson Jari (yellow card) 45+1'; Wellington Cabeça (yellow card) 54' (yellow-red card) 64'; Leandro Cabecinha (yellow card) 69'; Ezequias (red card) 73'; Evandro Gigante (yellow card) 85' | Stadium: Baenão; Attendance: 3,654; Referee: Joelson Nazareno Ferreira Cardoso |

| 2 August 2020 9 | Remo | 4–2 | Águia de Marabá | Belém |
| 15:30 UTC−3 | Gustavo Ermel 33'; Xaves (yellow card) 45+1'; Fredson (yellow card) 50'; Eduardo Ramos 81', 90+1'; Douglas Packer 90+6' | Report | Carlos Neto 11', (yellow card) 57'; Bruno Oliveira 43', (yellow card) 64'; Balão Marabá (yellow card) 46'; Juninho (yellow card) 84' | Stadium: Baenão; Attendance: 0 Referee: Joelson Silva dos Santos |
Note: Match originally scheduled for 21 March 2020, but postponed on 19 March due to concerns over the COVID-19 pandemic in Brazil. It was rescheduled to 2 August.

| 5 August 2020 10 | Tapajós | 1–3 | Remo | Belém |
| 20:00 UTC−3 | Andrezinho (yellow card) 36'; Dan 83' | Report | Gustavo Ermel 3'; Zé Carlos 23'; Douglas Packer 53' | Stadium: Mangueirão; Attendance: 0 Referee: Gustavo Ramos Melo |
Note: Match originally scheduled for 25 March 2020, but postponed on 19 March due to concerns over the COVID-19 pandemic in Brazil. It was rescheduled to 5 August.

==== Final stage ====
===== Semi-finals =====
| 13 August 2020 First leg | Castanhal | 0–1 | Remo | Belém |
| 20:00 UTC−3 | Betinho (yellow card) 45+1'; Lucão (yellow card) 76' | Report | Lucão 3' (o.g.); Rafael Jansen (yellow card) 23'; Wallace (yellow card) 90+4' | Stadium: Mangueirão; Attendance: 0 Referee: Joelson Nazareno Ferreira Cardoso |

| 20 August 2020 Second leg | Remo | 2–0 (3–0 agg.) | Castanhal | Belém |
| 20:00 UTC−3 | Eduardo Ramos 50' (pen.); Fredson (yellow card) 61'; Tcharlles 72' | Report | Tchoga (yellow card) 45+1'; Pecel (yellow card) 50'; Lucão (yellow card) 59' | Stadium: Mangueirão; Attendance: 0 Referee: Gustavo Ramos Melo |

===== Finals =====
| 2 September 2020 First leg | Paysandu | 2–1 | Remo | Belém |
| 20:00 UTC−3 | Bruno Collaço (yellow card) 32'; PH (yellow card) 33'; Nicolas (yellow card) 84'; Uilliam 85'; Netinho 88' | Report | Eduardo Ramos 38'; Julio Rusch (yellow card) 60'; Marlon (yellow card) 72'; Gelson (yellow card) 75' | Stadium: Mangueirão; Attendance: 0 Referee: Bráulio da Silva Machado |

| 6 September 2020 Second leg | Remo | 0–1 (1–3 agg.) | Paysandu | Belém |
| 17:00 UTC−3 | Zé Carlos (yellow card) 12'; Fredson (yellow card) 38' (yellow-red card) 39'; Marlon (yellow card) 48' | Report | Micael (yellow card) 39'; Elielton (yellow card) 39'; Uilliam (yellow card) 47'; Anderson Uchôa (yellow card) 55', (goal) 90+6'; Perema (yellow card) 68'; Luiz Felipe (red card) 81' | Stadium: Mangueirão; Attendance: 0 Referee: Wilton Sampaio |

=== Copa Verde ===
Win Draw Loss

==== Round of 16 ====
| 27 January 2021 | Remo | 1–0 | Gama | Belém |
| 16:00 UTC−3 | Kevem 22'; Salatiel (yellow card) 56'; Ricardo Luz (yellow card) 71'; Tcharlles (yellow card) 90+4' | Report | | Stadium: Mangueirão; Attendance: 0 Referee: Breno Vieira Souza |

==== Quarter-finals ====
| 3 February 2021 First leg | Remo | 2–0 | Independente | Belém |
| 16:00 UTC−3 | Wallace 32'; Mimica (yellow card) 78'; Laílson 89' | Report | Jeferson Jari (yellow card) 9'; Danrlei (yellow card) 21' (yellow-red card) 61'; Pedrão (red card) 83' | Stadium: Mangueirão; Attendance: 0 Referee: Rodrigo Batista Raposo |

| 7 February 2021 Second leg | Independente | 3–1 (3–3 agg.) (0–3 p) | Remo | Tucuruí |
| 16:00 UTC−3 | Joãozinho 51'; Ezequias (yellow card) 55'; Paulinho 60'; Cassiano (yellow card) 71'; Jerffeson (yellow card) 86'; Marcus Vinícius 90' | Report | Marlon (yellow card) 32'; Rafael Jansen (yellow card) 34'; Wallace (yellow card) 49'; Felipe Gedoz 58'; Wellington Silva (yellow card) 82' | Stadium: Navegantão; Attendance: 0 Referee: Alisson Sidnei Furtado |
| | Penalties |
| | Raygol (penalty missed); Rafael Vioto (penalty missed); Yuri (penalty missed) | | (penalty scored) Felipe Gedoz; (penalty scored) Wellington Silva; (penalty scored) Rafael Jansen |

==== Semi-finals ====
| 13 February 2021 First leg | Manaus | 1–1 | Remo | Manaus |
| 17:00 UTC−3 | Diego Rosa 6'; Thiago Spice (yellow card) 39' (yellow-red card) 54'; Rafael Pitanga (yellow card) 80' | Report | Wellington Silva (yellow card) 39', (goal) 88'; Lucas Siqueira (yellow card) 40' | Stadium: Arena da Amazônia; Attendance: 0 Referee: Paulo Henrique Schleich Vollkopf |

| 18 February 2021 Second leg | Remo | 6–2 (7–3 agg.) | Manaus | Belém |
| 16:00 UTC−3 | Hélio Borges 15', 16'; Lucas Siqueira 18'; Wallace 23'; Felipe Gedoz (yellow card) 44'; Laílson (yellow card) 67', (goal) 88'; Tiago Miranda 82' | Report | Luís Fernando 55'; Diego Rosa 61' (pen.); Tiago Costa (yellow card) 66'; Douglas Lima (yellow card) 70' | Stadium: Mangueirão; Attendance: 0 Referee: André Rodrigo Rocha |

==== Finals ====
| 21 February 2021 First leg | Brasiliense | 2–1 | Remo | Brasília |
| 15:30 UTC−3 | Sandy 31', (yellow card) 61'; Aldo 79' | Report | Wallace 22' | Stadium: Estádio Nacional Mané Garrincha; Attendance: 0 Referee: Dyorgines José Padovani de Andrade |

| 24 February 2021 Second leg | Remo | 2–1 (3–3 agg.) (4–5 p) | Brasiliense | Belém |
| 16:00 UTC−3 | Fredson 26'; Rafael Jansen 61' | Report | Badhuga (yellow card) 24'; Wagner Balotelli (yellow card) 27' (yellow-red card) 59'; Zé Eduardo (yellow card) 36', (goal) 49' | Stadium: Mangueirão; Attendance: 0 Referee: Jefferson Ferreira de Moraes |
| | Penalties |
| | Felipe Gedoz (penalty scored); Lucas Siqueira (penalty missed); Laílson (penalty scored); Wallace (penalty scored); Rafael Jansen (penalty scored); Wellington Silva (penalty missed) | | (penalty scored) Peu; (penalty scored) Aldo; (penalty missed) Sandy; (penalty scored) Jefferson Maranhão; (penalty scored) Romarinho; (penalty scored) Diogo |

=== Copa do Brasil ===
Win Draw Loss

==== First round ====
| 12 February 2020 | Freipaulistano | 1–2 | Remo | Frei Paulo |
| 16:00 UTC−3 | Luan 21'; Luciano (yellow card) 22'; Lídio (yellow card) 60'; Vitor Garcia (yellow card) 90+6' | Report | Ronaell (yellow card) 23'; Fredson 35'; Djalma (yellow card) 36'; Laílson (yellow card) 39'; Gustavo Ermel 70'; Vinícius (yellow card) 80'; Neguete (yellow card) 90+2' | Stadium: Titão; Attendance: 483; Referee: André Rodrigo Rocha |

==== Second round ====
| 20 February 2020 | Brusque | 5–1 | Remo | Brusque |
| 21:30 UTC−3 | Rodolfo Potiguar (yellow card) 27'; Zé Mateus (yellow card) 34'; Thiago Alagoano 39', 90+2' (yellow card) 57'; Alex Sandro (yellow card) 44'; Airton 58'; Marco Antônio (yellow card) 60'; Neguete 76' (o.g.); Edu 77' | Report | Laílson (yellow card) 24'; Fredson (yellow card) 48'; Ronaell (yellow card) 56'; Giovane Gomez 70' | Stadium: Estádio Augusto Bauer; Attendance: 2,316; Referee: Emerson de Almeida Ferreira |
