= 2020 Campeonato Paraense finals =

- Event: 2020 Campeonato Paraense
Paysandu	Remo
3	1
- on aggregate

First leg
Paysandu	Remo
2	1
- Date: 2 September 2020
- Venue: Mangueirão, Belém
- Referee: Bráulio da Silva Machado
- Attendance: 0

Second leg
Remo	Paysandu
0	1
- Date: 6 September 2020
- Venue: Mangueirão, Belém
- Referee: Wilton Pereira Sampaio
- Attendance: 0

The 2020 Campeonato Paraense finals was the final that decided the 2020 Campeonato Paraense, the 108th season of the Campeonato Paraense. The final were contested between Paysandu and Remo.

Paysandu defeated Remo 3–1 on aggregate to win their 48th Campeonato Paraense title.

== Road to the final ==
Note: In all scores below, the score of the home team is given first.

Paysandu			Round	Remo		
Opponent	Venue	Score		Opponent	Venue	Score
			Group stage			
Pos / Team / Pld / Pts; 1 / Paysandu / 10 / 25; 2 / Remo / 10 / 23; 3 / Castanhal / 10 / 20; 4 / Paragominas / 10 / 16; 5 / Bragantino / 10 / 16; Updated to match(es) played on 5 August 2020. Source: Globo Esporte			Group stage	Pos / Team / Pld / Pts; 1 / Paysandu / 10 / 25; 2 / Remo / 10 / 23; 3 / Castanhal / 10 / 20; 4 / Paragominas / 10 / 16; 5 / Bragantino / 10 / 16; Updated to match(es) played on 5 August 2020. Source: Globo Esporte		
Paragominas (won 4–3 on aggregate)	Away	3–2	Semi-finals	Castanhal (won 3–0 on aggregate)	Away	0–1
Paragominas (won 4–3 on aggregate)	Home	2–0	Semi-finals	Castanhal (won 3–0 on aggregate)	Home	2–0

== Format ==
The finals were played on a home-and-away two-legged basis. If tied on aggregate, the penalty shoot-out was used to determine the winner.

== Matches ==
=== First leg ===
2 September 2020
20:00 UTC−3

Paysandu	2–1	Remo
Uilliam 85'; Netinho 88'	Report	Eduardo Ramos 38'

Mangueirão, Belém
Attendance: 0
Referee: Bráulio da Silva Machado

Paysandu	Remo

GK	1	(Brazil) Gabriel Leite
DF	2	(Brazil) Tony		(substituted off) 84'
DF	34	(Brazil) Micael (c)
DF	26	(Brazil) Perema
DF	5	(Brazil) Bruno Collaço	(yellow card) 32'	(substituted off) 70'
MF	4	(Brazil) Anderson Uchôa
MF	55	(Brazil) PH	(yellow card) 33'	(substituted off) 70'
MF	98	(Brazil) Alan Calbergue		(substituted off) 66'
FW	10	(Brazil) Vinícius Leite
FW	77	(Brazil) Mateus Anderson		(substituted off) 70'
FW	11	(Brazil) Nicolas		(yellow card) 84'
Substitutes:
DF	31	(Brazil) Netinho		(substituted in) 84'
DF	36	(Brazil) Diego Matos		(substituted in) 70'
MF	88	(Brazil) Serginho		(substituted in) 70'
MF	96	(Brazil) Luiz Felipe		(substituted in) 66'
FW	94	(Brazil) Uilliam		(substituted in) 70'
Coach:
(Brazil) Hélio dos Anjos

GK	1	(Brazil) Vinícius (c)
DF	21	(Brazil) Everton Castro		(substituted off) 80'
DF	4	(Brazil) Rafael Jansen
DF	90	(Brazil) Fredson
DF	6	(Brazil) Marlon		(yellow card) 72'
MF	23	(Brazil) Lucas Siqueira
MF	94	(Brazil) Gelson		(yellow card) 75'
MF	74	(Brazil) Julio Rusch	(yellow card) 60'	(substituted off) 66'
FW	7	(Brazil) Gustavo Ermel		(substituted off) 66'
FW	10	(Brazil) Eduardo Ramos		(substituted off) 53'
FW	27	(Brazil) Tcharlles
Substitutes:
DF	30	(Brazil) Kevem		(substituted in) 80'
MF	98	(Brazil) Laílson		(substituted in) 66'
MF	25	(Brazil) Djalma		(substituted in) 66'
MF	8	(Brazil) Douglas Packer		(substituted in) 53'
Coach:
(Brazil) Mazola Júnior

Assistant referees:
Danilo Ricardo Simon Manis (São Paulo)
Neuza Inês Back (São Paulo)
Fourth official:
Andrey da Silva e Silva (Pará)

=== Second leg ===
6 September 2020
17:00 UTC−3

Remo	0–1	Paysandu
	Report	Anderson Uchôa 90+6'

Mangueirão, Belém
Attendance: 0
Referee: Wilton Pereira Sampaio

Remo	Paysandu

GK	1	(Brazil) Vinícius (c)
DF	21	(Brazil) Everton Castro		(substituted off) 56'
DF	4	(Brazil) Rafael Jansen
DF	90	(Brazil) Fredson		(yellow card) 38' (yellow-red card) 39'
DF	6	(Brazil) Marlon		(yellow card) 48'
MF	23	(Brazil) Lucas Siqueira
MF	24	(Brazil) Charles
MF	25	(Brazil) Djalma		(substituted off) 26'
FW	7	(Brazil) Gustavo Ermel		(substituted off) 56'
FW	27	(Brazil) Tcharlles
FW	9	(Brazil) Zé Carlos	(yellow card) 12'	(substituted off) 40'
Substitutes:
DF	3	(Brazil) Mimica		(substituted in) 40'
MF	94	(Brazil) Gelson		(substituted in) 26'
MF	20	(Brazil) Carlos Alberto		(substituted in) 56'
FW	35	(Brazil) Hélio Borges		(substituted in) 56'
Coach:
(Brazil) Mazola Júnior

GK	1	(Brazil) Gabriel Leite
DF	2	(Brazil) Tony
DF	34	(Brazil) Micael (c)	(yellow card) 39'	(substituted off) 45+3'
DF	26	(Brazil) Perema
DF	5	(Brazil) Bruno Collaço		(substituted off) 73'
MF	4	(Brazil) Anderson Uchôa		(yellow card) 55'
MF	55	(Brazil) PH		(substituted off) 73'
MF	98	(Brazil) Alan Calbergue		(substituted off) 46'
FW	10	(Brazil) Vinícius Leite
FW	77	(Brazil) Mateus Anderson		(substituted off) 46'
FW	11	(Brazil) Nicolas
Substitutes:
DF	3	(Brazil) Wesley Matos		(substituted in) 45+3'
DF	36	(Brazil) Diego Matos		(substituted in) 73'
MF	88	(Brazil) Serginho		(substituted in) 73'
MF	96	(Brazil) Luiz Felipe	(red card) 81'	(substituted in) 46'
FW	94	(Brazil) Uilliam	(yellow card) 47'	(substituted in) 46'
Coach:
(Brazil) Hélio dos Anjos

Assistant referees:
Guilherme Dias Camilo (Minas Gerais)
Bruno Raphael Pires (Goiás)
Fourth official:
Elaine da Silva Melo (Pará)

== See also ==
- 2021 Copa Verde
- 2021 Copa do Brasil
