= 2024 Santa Cruz Futebol Clube season =

Santa Cruz
2024 season
- Chairman: Bruno Rodrigues
- Manager: Itamar Schulle
- Stadium: Estádio do Arruda
- Pernambucano: Semi-finals
- Copa do Nordeste: Preliminary round
- Top goalscorer: League: All: Pedro Bortoluzo and Thiaguinho (4)
Home colours	Away colours

The 2024 season was Santa Cruz's 111th season in the club's history. Santa Cruz competed in the Campeonato Pernambucano and Copa do Nordeste.

== Squad ==
Note: Flags indicate national team as defined under FIFA eligibility rules; some limited exceptions apply. Players may hold more than one non-FIFA nationality.

No.	Pos.	Nation	Player
1	GK	BRA	Michael Fracaro
12	GK	BRA	Matheus Inácio
—	GK	BRA	Geaze
4	DF	BRA	Rafael Alemão
14	DF	BRA	Yan Oliveira
3	DF	BRA	Ítalo Melo
15	DF	BRA	Gabriel Yanno
13	DF	BRA	Eduardo Ferraz
16	DF	BRA	Paim
6	DF	BRA	Eduardo Guedes
5	MF	BRA	Daniel Pereira
—	MF	BRA	Pingo

No.	Pos.	Nation	Player
8	MF	BRA	Anderson Paulista
10	MF	BRA	Anderson Ceará
7	MF	BRA	Ítalo Henrique
—	MF	BRA	Fabrício Bigode
23	MF	BRA	Chiquinho
—	MF	BRA	Felipe Gedoz
—	MF	BRA	Maranhão
—	FW	BRA	Emerson Galego
—	FW	BRA	Hugo Cabral
—	FW	BRA	Pipico
—	FW	BRA	Michel Douglas
—	FW	BRA	Dagson

== Statistics ==
=== Overall ===
Games played	13 (12 Pernambucano, 1 Copa do Nordeste)
Games won	7 (7 Pernambucano, 0 Copa do Nordeste)
Games drawn	4 (3 Pernambucano, 1 Copa do Nordeste)
Games lost	2 (2 Pernambucano, 0 Copa do Nordeste)
Goals scored	20
Goals conceded	10
Goal difference	+10
Best result (goal difference)	5–1 (H) v Afogados da Ingazeira – Pernambucano – 2024.02.19
Worst result (goal difference)	1–2 (A) v Sport – Pernambucano – 2024.01.20; 1–2 (H) v Náutico – Pernambucano – 2024.01.27
Top scorer	Pedro Bortoluzo and Thiaguinho (4)

Source: Santa Cruz official website

=== Goalscorers ===
Place	Position	Nationality	Number	Name	Copa do Nordeste	Campeonato Pernambucano	Total
1	FW	(Brazil)	9	Pedro Bortoluzo	0	4	4
1	FW	(Brazil)	17	Thiaguinho	1	3	4
2	FW	(Brazil)	19	Gilvan	0	3	3
2	FW	(Brazil)	7	João Diogo	0	3	3
3	MF	(Brazil)	5	Lucas Siqueira	1	1	2
4	MF	(Brazil)	15	Caio Mello	0	1	1
4	MF	(Brazil)	10	João Pedro	0	1	1
4	MF	(Brazil)	10	Matheus Melo	0	1	1
4	DF	(Brazil)	3	Paulo César	0	1	1
				Total	2	18	20

=== Managers performance ===
Name	Nationality	From	To	P	W	D	L	GF	GA	Avg%	Ref
Itamar Schulle	Brazil	7 January 2024	16 March 2024	13	7	4	2	20	10	64%	

== Friendlies ==
7 December 2024	CSA	1–0	Santa Cruz	Maceió
18:00 (UTC-3)	Guilherme Cachoeira 85'	Report		Stadium: Estádio Rei Pelé; Referee: José Jaini Bispo

== Official competitions ==
=== Copa do Nordeste ===
==== Preliminary round ====
7 January 2024	Altos	2–2 (11–10 p)	Santa Cruz	Teresina
19:00 (UTC-3)	Leandro 49'; Matheus Lima 80'	Report	Thiaguinho 22'; Lucas Siqueira 42'	Stadium: Estádio Lindolfo Monteiro; Attendance: 892; Referee: Wagner Francisco Silva Souza
	Penalties
	Rhuann (penalty scored); Dhonata (penalty scored); Ricardo (penalty scored); Arthuzinho (penalty scored); Matheus Lima (penalty scored); Rodrigo (penalty scored); João Pedro (penalty scored); Arlan (penalty scored); Luis Guilherme (penalty missed); Leandro Amorim (penalty scored); Careca (penalty scored); Rhuann (penalty scored)		(penalty scored) Rafael Pereira; (penalty scored) Carlos Henrique; (penalty scored) Toty; (penalty scored) Caio Mello; (penalty scored) Gabriel Cardoso; (penalty scored) João Diogo; (penalty scored) Juan Tavares; (penalty scored) Felipe Cardoso; (penalty missed) Paulo César; (penalty scored) Luis Felipe; (penalty scored) André Luiz; (penalty missed) Rafael Pereira

==== Record ====
Final Position	Points	Matches	Wins	Draws	Losses	Goals For	Goals Away	Avg%
N/A	1	1	0	1	0	2	2	33%

=== Campeonato Pernambucano ===
==== First stage ====
11 January 2024 1	Santa Cruz	2–0	Maguary	Recife
20:00 (UTC-3)	Thiaguinho 8'; Pedro Bortoluzo 27'	Report		Stadium: Estádio José do Rego Maciel (Arruda); Attendance: 18,003; Referee: Rodrigo José Pereira de Lima

17 January 2024 2	Santa Cruz	1–0	Flamengo de Arcoverde	Recife
21:00 (UTC-3)	João Diogo 42'	Report		Stadium: Estádio José do Rego Maciel (Arruda); Attendance: 15,657; Referee: Tiago Nascimento dos Santos

20 January 2024 3	Sport	2–1	Santa Cruz	São Lourenço da Mata
16:30 (UTC-3)	Gustavo Coutinho 40'; Fábio Matheus 81'	Report	Thiaguinho 56'	Stadium: Estádio Governador Carlos Wilson Campos (Arena Pernambuco); Attendance: 20,860; Referee: Rodrigo Pereira

27 January 2024 5	Santa Cruz	1–2	Náutico	Recife
16:30 (UTC-3)	João Diogo 22'	Report	Marcos Júnior 3'; Paulo Sérgio 83'	Stadium: Estádio José do Rego Maciel (Arruda); Attendance: 16,003; Referee: Diego Fernando Silva de Lima

31 January 2024 6	Porto	1–3	Santa Cruz	Caruaru
19:00 (UTC-3)	Zé Werison 53'	Report	Pedro Bortoluzo 31'; Thiaguinho 46'; Caio Mello 64'	Stadium: Estádio Luiz José de Lacerda (Lacerdão); Attendance: 3,120; Referee: José Woshington

6 February 2024 7	Petrolina	1–2	Santa Cruz	Petrolina
16:30 (UTC-3)	Emerson Galego 48'	Report	Matheus Melo 1'; Pedro Bortoluzo 79' (pen.)	Stadium: Estádio Paulo de Souza Coelho; Attendance: 1,848; Referee: Rodrigo Jose Pereira de Lima

15 February 2024 4*	Santa Cruz	0–0	Retrô	Recife
20:00 (UTC-3)		Report		Stadium: Estádio José do Rego Maciel (Arruda); Attendance: 13,309; Referee: Paulo Belence Alves dos Prazeres Filho

19 February 2024 8	Santa Cruz	5–1	Afogados da Ingazeira	Recife
20:00 (UTC-3)	Paulo César 20'; Pedro Bortoluzo 53'; João Diogo 55'; João Pedro 81'; Gilvan 90'	Report	Rodrigo 25'	Stadium: Estádio José do Rego Maciel (Arruda); Attendance: 14,235; Referee: Anderson Luis Marques

24 February 2024 9	Central	0–1	Santa Cruz	Caruaru
16:30 (UTC-3)		Report	Gilvan 72'	Stadium: Estádio Luiz José de Lacerda (Lacerdão); Referee: Gilberto Rodrigues Castro Junior

==== Second stage ====
2 March 2024	Santa Cruz	1–0	Central	Recife
16:30 (UTC-3)	Gilvan 80'	Report		Stadium: Estádio José do Rego Maciel (Arruda); Attendance: 35,023; Referee: Deborah Cecilia Cruz Correia

==== Semi-finals ====
9 March 2024	Santa Cruz	1–1	Sport	Recife
16:30 (UTC-3)	Lucas Siqueira 45'	Report	Felipinho 90+26'	Stadium: Estádio José do Rego Maciel (Arruda); Attendance: 35,601; Referee: Diego Fernando Silva de Lima

16 March 2024	Sport	0–0 (5–3 p)	Santa Cruz	São Lourenço da Mata
16:30 (UTC-3)		Report		Stadium: Estádio Governador Carlos Wilson Campos (Arena Pernambuco); Attendance: 45,492; Referee: Deborah Cecília Cruz Correia
	Penalties
	Gustavo Coutinho (penalty scored); Zé Roberto (penalty scored); Tití Ortiz (penalty scored); Pablo Dyego (penalty scored); Chrystian Barletta (penalty scored)		(penalty scored) Lucas Siqueira; (penalty scored) Gilvan; (penalty missed) Toty; (penalty scored) Gabriel Cardoso

==== Record ====
Final Position	Points	Matches	Wins	Draws	Losses	Goals For	Goals Away	Avg%
4th	24	12	7	3	2	18	8	66%

(*) Postponed matches due to changes in competition schedules
