= 2020 Campeonato Brasileiro Série C =

Campeonato Brasileiro Série C
- Season: 2020
- Dates: 8 August 2020 – 30 January 2021
- Champions: Vila Nova (3rd title)
- Promoted: Brusque; Londrina; Remo; Vila Nova
- Relegated: Boa Esporte; Imperatriz; São Bento; Treze
- Matches played: 206
- Goals scored: 498 (2.42 per match)
- Top goalscorer: Thiago Alagoano (12 goals)
- Biggest home win: Botafogo-PB 7–0 Imperatriz; Group A, R14, 7 November; Ferroviário 7–0 Imperatriz; Group A, R17, 28 November
- Biggest away win: Brusque 1–8 Volta Redonda; Group B, R17, 28 November
- Highest scoring: Brusque 1–8 Volta Redonda; Group B, R17, 28 November
- Longest winning run: 7 games Santa Cruz
- Longest unbeaten run: 10 games Santa Cruz; Tombense; Vila Nova
- Longest winless run: 18 games Imperatriz
- Longest losing run: 17 games Imperatriz

The 2020 Campeonato Brasileiro Série C was a football competition held in Brazil, equivalent to the third division. The competition was originally scheduled to begin on 3 May and end on 8 November, however due to COVID-19 pandemic the tournament was rescheduled for 8 August 2020 – 30 January 2021.

Twenty teams competed in the tournament, twelve returning from the 2019 season, four promoted from the 2019 Campeonato Brasileiro Série D (Brusque, Manaus, Ituano and Jacuipense) and four relegated from the 2019 Campeonato Brasileiro Série B (Londrina, São Bento, Criciúma and Vila Nova).

The matches Treze v Imperatriz, scheduled for 9 August 2020 (Group A 1st round), and Imperatriz v Jacuipense, scheduled for 15 August 2020 (Group A 2nd round), were postponed after 14 Imperatriz players tested positive for COVID-19.

Brusque, Londrina, Remo and Vila Nova were promoted to the 2021 Campeonato Brasileiro Série B.

Vila Nova defeated Remo 8–3 on aggregate in the finals to win their third title.

== Format changes ==
Starting from this edition, the quarter-finals and semi-finals were replaced by a second group stage played by eight teams. They were divided into two groups of four teams each. The top two teams of each group were promoted to the Série B, while the group winners qualified for the finals.

== Teams ==
Location of teams in 2020 Série C

Pos.	Relegated from 2019 Série B
17º	Londrina
18º	São Bento
19º	Criciúma
20º	Vila Nova

Pos.	Promoted from 2019 Série D
1º	Brusque
2º	Manaus
3º	Ituano
4º	Jacuipense

=== Number of teams by state ===
Number of teams	State	Team(s)
2	Minas Gerais	Boa Esporte and Tombense
2	Pará	Paysandu and Remo
2	Paraíba	Botafogo-PB and Treze
2	Rio Grande do Sul	São José and Ypiranga
2	Santa Catarina	Brusque and Criciúma
2	São Paulo	Ituano and São Bento
1	Amazonas	Manaus
1	Bahia	Jacuipense
1	Ceará	Ferroviário
1	Goiás	Vila Nova
1	Maranhão	Imperatriz
1	Paraná	Londrina
1	Pernambuco	Santa Cruz
1	Rio de Janeiro	Volta Redonda

== Personnel ==
Team	Home city	Manager	Kit Manufacturer
Boa Esporte	Varginha	(Brazil) Ariel Mamede	(Brazil) GSport
Botafogo-PB	João Pessoa	(Brazil) Evaristo Piza	(Brazil) Belo 1931 (Club manufactured kit)
Brusque	Brusque	(Brazil) Jerson Testoni	(Brazil) Embratex
Criciúma	Criciúma	(Brazil) Itamar Schülle	(Brazil) Garra91 (Club manufactured kit)
Ferroviário	Fortaleza	(Brazil) Totonho (caretaker)	(Brazil) BM9 Sports
Imperatriz	Imperatriz	(Brazil) Charles Guerreiro	(Brazil) DG Sports
Ituano	Itu	(Brazil) Vinícius Bergantin	(Brazil) Kanxa
Jacuipense	Riachão do Jacuípe	(Brazil) Jonilson Veloso	(Brazil) Niory Sports
Londrina	Londrina	(Brazil) Silvinho (caretaker)	(Brazil) Karilu
Manaus	Manaus	(Brazil) Souza Baiano (caretaker)	(Brazil) Soft Malhas
Paysandu	Belém	(Brazil) João Brigatti	(Brazil) Lobo (Club manufactured kit)
Remo	Belém	(Brazil) Paulo Bonamigo	(Italy) Kappa
Santa Cruz	Recife	(Brazil) Marcelo Martelotte	(Brazil) Cobra Coral (Club manufactured kit)
São Bento	Sorocaba	(Brazil) Edson Vieira	(Spain) Joma
São José	Porto Alegre	(Brazil) China Balbino	(Brazil) Mega Sports
Tombense	Tombos	(Brazil) Julinho Camargo	(Brazil) Vettor
Treze	Campina Grande	(Brazil) Márcio Fernandes	(Brazil) Karilu
Vila Nova	Goiânia	(Brazil) Márcio Fernandes	(Brazil) V43 (Club manufactured kit)
Volta Redonda	Volta Redonda	(Brazil) Neto Colucci	(Brazil) Ícone sports
Ypiranga	Erechim	(Brazil) Celso Teixeira	(Brazil) Clanel

== First stage ==
In the first stage, each group was played on a home-and-away round-robin basis. The teams were ranked according to points (3 points for a win, 1 point for a draw, and 0 points for a loss). If tied on points, the following criteria would be used to determine the ranking: 1. Wins; 2. Goal difference; 3. Goals scored; 4. Head-to-head (if the tie is only between two teams); 5. Fewest red cards; 6. Fewest yellow cards; 7. Draw in the headquarters of the Brazilian Football Confederation (Regulations Article 15).

The top four teams of each group advanced to the second stage.

=== Group A ===
Pos	Team	Pld	W	D	L	GF	GA	GD	Pts	Qualification or relegation
1	Santa Cruz	18	11	4	3	32	16	+16	37	Advance to second stage
2	Remo	18	8	7	3	20	10	+10	31	Advance to second stage
3	Vila Nova	18	8	7	3	20	11	+9	31	Advance to second stage
4	Paysandu	18	8	5	5	25	14	+11	29	Advance to second stage
5	Manaus	18	6	8	4	19	18	+1	26	
6	Jacuipense	18	6	6	6	19	21	−2	24	
7	Ferroviário	18	6	5	7	27	22	+5	23	
8	Botafogo-PB	18	4	8	6	19	17	+2	20	
9	Treze (R)	18	4	7	7	19	21	−2	19	Relegation to 2021 Campeonato Brasileiro Série D
10	Imperatriz (R)	18	0	1	17	10	60	−50	1	Relegation to 2021 Campeonato Brasileiro Série D

Source: CBF
Rules for classification: 1) points; 2) wins; 3) goal difference; 4) goals scored; 5) head-to-head results (only between 2 teams); 6) fewest red cards; 7) fewest yellow cards; 8) draw.
(R) Relegated

==== Results ====
Home \ Away	BOT	FER	IMP	JAC	MAN	PAY	REM	SAN	TRE	VIL
Botafogo-PB	—	2–1	7–0	1–1	0–0	1–1	0–0	1–2	1–1	0–0
Ferroviário	2–0	—	7–0	0–0	1–1	0–2	1–0	1–3	0–1	4–0
Imperatriz	1–2	1–2	—	1–2	1–2	0–3	0–0	1–6	1–2	1–3
Jacuipense	1–1	0–0	3–1	—	1–0	0–1	1–2	1–0	3–2	0–3
Manaus	3–2	1–1	1–0	2–1	—	2–1	0–2	0–0	1–1	1–1
Paysandu	1–0	3–0	6–1	1–2	1–1	—	2–3	0–0	1–0	0–0
Remo	0–0	2–1	5–0	2–0	1–0	0–0	—	0–2	1–0	0–0
Santa Cruz	1–0	3–3	2–0	3–3	1–2	2–1	1–0	—	3–2	2–0
Treze	2–0	0–3	4–1	0–0	1–1	0–1	2–2	0–1	—	1–1
Vila Nova	0–1	3–0	3–0	1–0	2–1	2–0	0–0	1–0	0–0	—

Source: CBF
Legend: Blue = home team win; Yellow = draw; Red = away team win.

=== Group B ===
Pos	Team	Pld	W	D	L	GF	GA	GD	Pts	Qualification or relegation
1	Ypiranga	18	9	4	5	31	26	+5	31	Advance to second stage
2	Ituano	18	8	5	5	28	20	+8	29	Advance to second stage
3	Londrina	18	8	5	5	20	16	+4	29	Advance to second stage
4	Brusque	18	8	5	5	23	26	−3	29	Advance to second stage
5	Tombense	18	7	6	5	21	18	+3	27	
6	Volta Redonda	18	5	8	5	31	23	+8	23	
7	Criciúma	18	4	7	7	20	25	−5	19	
8	São José	18	5	5	8	15	23	−8	20	
9	São Bento (R)	18	3	8	7	13	19	−6	17	Relegation to 2021 Campeonato Brasileiro Série D
10	Boa Esporte (R)	18	2	9	7	17	23	−6	15	Relegation to 2021 Campeonato Brasileiro Série D

Source: CBF
Rules for classification: 1) points; 2) wins; 3) goal difference; 4) goals scored; 5) head-to-head results (only between 2 teams); 6) fewest red cards; 7) fewest yellow cards; 8) draw.
(R) Relegated

==== Results ====
Home \ Away	BOA	BRU	CRI	ITU	LON	SBE	SJO	TOM	VOL	YPI
Boa Esporte	—	0–1	2–0	1–2	0–0	0–1	1–0	1–1	2–2	1–1
Brusque	2–2	—	3–1	2–0	2–1	1–0	0–0	1–0	1–8	2–1
Criciúma	3–1	2–2	—	0–2	2–1	3–1	2–0	0–1	1–1	4–4
Ituano	4–3	3–1	2–2	—	1–1	0–0	2–2	3–0	2–0	1–2
Londrina	2–0	2–1	0–0	1–0	—	1–0	1–0	2–1	1–0	3–2
São Bento	1–1	0–1	0–0	0–3	1–0	—	2–0	2–2	1–1	1–1
São José	0–0	1–0	2–0	0–1	0–0	1–0	—	2–2	0–2	2–0
Tombense	1–1	2–0	1–0	0–0	2–1	1–1	4–0	—	1–0	2–0
Volta Redonda	0–0	2–2	0–0	3–1	2–2	1–1	3–4	2–0	—	1–2
Ypiranga	2–1	1–1	2–0	2–1	2–1	2–1	3–1	2–0	2–3	—

Source: CBF
Legend: Blue = home team win; Yellow = draw; Red = away team win.

== Second stage ==
In the second stage, each group was played on a home-and-away round-robin basis. The teams were ranked according to points (3 points for a win, 1 point for a draw, and 0 points for a loss). If tied on points, the criteria to determine the ranking were the same as used in the first stage (Regulations Article 19).

The top two teams of each group were promoted to the Série B. Group winners advanced to the finals.

=== Group C ===
Pos	Team	Pld	W	D	L	GF	GA	GD	Pts	Qualification
1	Vila Nova (P)	6	3	1	2	6	7	−1	10	Advance to Finals and promoted to 2021 Campeonato Brasileiro Série B
2	Brusque (P)	6	2	3	1	9	6	+3	9	Promoted to 2021 Campeonato Brasileiro Série B
3	Santa Cruz	6	2	2	2	8	7	+1	8	
4	Ituano	6	1	2	3	7	10	−3	5	

Source: CBF
Rules for classification: 1) points; 2) wins; 3) goal difference; 4) goals scored; 5) head-to-head results (only between 2 teams); 6) fewest red cards; 7) fewest yellow cards; 8) draw.
(P) Promoted

==== Results ====
Home \ Away	BRU	ITU	SAN	VIL
Brusque	—	4–2	0–0	0–0
Ituano	1–1	—	1–2	0–1
Santa Cruz	3–1	1–1	—	1–2
Vila Nova	0–3	1–2	2–1	—

Source: CBF
Legend: Blue = home team win; Yellow = draw; Red = away team win.

=== Group D ===
Pos	Team	Pld	W	D	L	GF	GA	GD	Pts	Qualification
1	Remo (P)	6	3	1	2	7	5	+2	10	Advance to Finals and promoted to 2021 Campeonato Brasileiro Série B
2	Londrina (P)	6	2	3	1	7	6	+1	9	Promoted to 2021 Campeonato Brasileiro Série B
3	Ypiranga	6	2	1	3	8	9	−1	7	
4	Paysandu	6	2	1	3	6	8	−2	7	

Source: CBF
Rules for classification: 1) points; 2) wins; 3) goal difference; 4) goals scored; 5) head-to-head results (only between 2 teams); 6) fewest red cards; 7) fewest yellow cards; 8) draw.
(P) Promoted

==== Results ====
Home \ Away	LON	PAY	REM	YPI
Londrina	—	0–0	0–0	1–1
Paysandu	3–2	—	0–1	2–1
Remo	0–1	3–1	—	2–1
Ypiranga	2–3	1–0	2–1	—

Source: CBF
Legend: Blue = home team win; Yellow = draw; Red = away team win.

== Finals ==
The finals were played on a home-and-away two-legged basis, with the higher-seeded team hosting the second leg. If tied on aggregate, the away goals rule would not be used, extra time would not be played, and the penalty shoot-out would be used to determine the champions (Regulations Article 20).

The finalists were seeded according to their performance in the tournament. The teams were ranked according to overall points. If tied on overall points, the following criteria would be used to determine the ranking: 1. Overall wins; 2. Overall goal difference; 3. Draw in the headquarters of the Brazilian Football Confederation (Regulations Article 21).

Pos	Team	Pld	W	D	L	GF	GA	GD	Pts	Host
1	(Pará) Remo	24	11	8	5	27	15	+12	41	2nd leg
2	(Goiás) Vila Nova	24	11	8	5	26	18	+8	41	1st leg

Source: CBF

The matches were played on 23 and 30 January 2021.

Team 1	Agg.	Team 2	1st leg	2nd leg
Vila Nova (Goiás)	8–3	(Pará) Remo	5–1	3–2

=== Matches ===
23 January 2021
17:00

Vila Nova (Goiás)	5–1	(Pará) Remo
Talles 25', 36'; Alan Mineiro 45+2'; Henan 58', 69'	Report	Gilberto Alemão 9'

Estádio Onésio Brasileiro Alvarenga, Goiânia
Attendance: 0
Referee: Caio Max Augusto Vieira (Rio Grande do Norte)

30 January 2021
17:00

Remo (Pará)	2–3	(Goiás) Vila Nova
Felipe Gedoz 7'; Lucas Siqueira 35'	Report	Alan Mineiro 9'; Mimica 40' (o.g.), 88' (o.g.)

Estádio Olímpico do Pará, Belém
Attendance: 0
Referee: Ramon Abatti Abel (Santa Catarina)

== Top goalscorers ==
Rank	Player	Club	Goals
1	(Brazil) Thiago Alagoano	Brusque	12
2	(Brazil) Willian Lira	Ferroviário	11
3	(Brazil) Henan	Vila Nova	10
3	(Brazil) Neto Pessoa	Ypiranga	10
5	(Brazil) Nicolas	Paysandu	9
6	(Brazil) Chiquinho	Santa Cruz	8
6	(Brazil) Hamilton	Manaus	8
6	(Brazil) João Carlos	Volta Redonda	8
9	(Brazil) Caprini	Ypiranga	7
9	(Brazil) Fernandinho	Ypiranga	7
9	(Brazil) Rubens	Tombense	7

Source: CBF
