= João Diogo =

João Diogo may refer to:

- João Diogo (footballer, born 1988), João Diogo Gomes de Freitas, Portuguese football right-back
- João Diogo (footballer, born 1999), João Diogo Jennings, Brazilian football forward
