= 2019 Campeonato Brasileiro Série C =

Campeonato Brasileiro Série C
- Season: 2019
- Dates: 27 April – 6 October
- Champions: Náutico (1st title)
- Promoted: Confiança; Juventude; Náutico; Sampaio Corrêa
- Relegated: ABC; Atlético Acreano; Globo; Luverdense
- Matches: 194
- Goals: 439 (2.26 per match)
- Top goalscorer: Eduardo; Luiz Eduardo; Negueba; Salatiel (8 goals each)
- Biggest home win: Luverdense 4–0 Atlético Acreano; R9, 23 June; Paysandu 4–0 Atlético Acreano; R16, 10 August; Juventude 4–0 Imperatriz; Quarter-finals 2nd leg, 9 September
- Biggest away win: Globo 0–3 Botafogo-PB; R16, 10 August
- Highest attendance: 30,242; Paysandu 1–1 Remo; R18, 25 August
- Lowest attendance: 42; Atlético Acreano 3–2 Luverdense; R18, 25 August
- Total attendance: 841,235
- Average attendance: 4,336

The 2019 Campeonato Brasileiro Série C was a football competition held in Brazil, equivalent to the third division. The competition started on 27 April and ended on 6 October 2019.

Twenty teams competed in the tournament, twelve returning from the 2018 season, four promoted from the 2018 Campeonato Brasileiro Série D (Ferroviário, Treze, São José and Imperatriz), and four relegated from the 2018 Campeonato Brasileiro Série B (Paysandu, Sampaio Corrêa, Juventude and Boa Esporte).

Confiança, Juventude, Náutico and Sampaio Corrêa qualified for the semi-finals and were promoted to the 2020 Campeonato Brasileiro Série B.

Náutico defeated Sampaio Corrêa 5–3 on aggregate in the finals to win their first title.

== Teams ==
Location of teams in 2019 Série C

Pos.	Relegated from 2018 Série B
17º	Paysandu
18º	Sampaio Corrêa
19º	Juventude
20º	Boa Esporte

Pos.	Promoted from 2018 Série D
1º	Ferroviário
2º	Treze
3°	São José
4º	Imperatriz

=== Number of teams by state ===
Number of teams	State	Team(s)
3	Rio Grande do Sul	Juventude, São José and Ypiranga
2	Maranhão	Imperatriz and Sampaio Corrêa
2	Minas Gerais	Boa Esporte and Tombense
2	Pará	Paysandu and Remo
2	Paraíba	Botafogo-PB and Treze
2	Pernambuco	Náutico and Santa Cruz
2	Rio Grande do Norte	ABC and Globo
1	Acre	Atlético Acreano
1	Ceará	Ferroviário
1	Mato Grosso	Luverdense
1	Rio de Janeiro	Volta Redonda
1	Sergipe	Confiança

== Personnel ==
Team	Home city	Manager	Kit Manufacturer
ABC	Natal	(Brazil) Roberto Fernandes	(Brazil) ERK
Atlético Acreano	Rio Branco	(Brazil) Álvaro Miguéis	(Brazil) Criare
Boa Esporte	Varginha	(Brazil) Nedo Xavier	(Brazil) GSport
Botafogo-PB	João Pessoa	(Brazil) Evaristo Piza	(Brazil) Karilu
Confiança	Aracaju	(Brazil) Daniel Paulista	(Brazil) WA Sport
Ferroviário	Fortaleza	(Brazil) Marcelo Veiga	(Brazil) BM9 Sports
Globo	Ceará-Mirim	(Brazil) Higor César	(Brazil) AM Confecção
Imperatriz	Imperatriz	(Brazil) Paulinho Kobayashi	(Brazil) Embratex
Juventude	Caxias do Sul	(Brazil) Fahel	(Brazil) 19treze (Club manufactured kit)
Luverdense	Lucas do Rio Verde	(Brazil) Maico Gaúcho	(Brazil) Kanxa
Náutico	Recife	(Brazil) Gilmar Dal Pozzo	(Brazil) N Seis (Club Manufactured kit)
Paysandu	Belém	(Brazil) Hélio dos Anjos	(Brazil) Lobo (Club manufactured kit)
Remo	Belém	(Brazil) Márcio Fernandes	(Brazil) Topper
Sampaio Corrêa	São Luís	(Brazil) João Brigatti	(Brazil) Tubarão 1923 (Club manufactured kit)
Santa Cruz	Recife	(Brazil) Milton Mendes	(Brazil) Cobra Coral (Club manufactured kit)
São José	Porto Alegre	(Brazil) Rafael Jaques	(Brazil) Mega Sports
Tombense	Tombos	(Brazil) Eugênio Souza	(Brazil) Vettor
Treze	Campina Grande	(Brazil) Celso Teixeira	(Brazil) Karilu
Volta Redonda	Volta Redonda	(Brazil) Toninho Andrade	(Brazil) Ícone sports
Ypiranga	Erechim	(Brazil) Fabiano Daitx	(Brazil) Clanel

== Group stage ==
In the group stage, each group was played on a home-and-away round-robin basis. The teams were ranked according to points (3 points for a win, 1 point for a draw, and 0 points for a loss). If tied on points, the following criteria would be used to determine the ranking: 1. Wins; 2. Goal difference; 3. Goals scored; 4. Head-to-head (if the tie is only between two teams). If tied on aggregate, the away goals rule would be used (except if both teams shared the same stadium); 5. Fewest red cards; 6. Fewest yellow cards; 7. Draw in the headquarters of the Brazilian Football Confederation (Regulations Article 15).

The top four teams of each group advanced to the quarter-finals of the knockout stages.

=== Group A ===
Pos	Team	Pld	W	D	L	GF	GA	GD	Pts	Qualification or relegation
1	Náutico	18	10	3	5	24	18	+6	33	Advance to Final stages
2	Sampaio Corrêa	18	9	4	5	22	19	+3	31	Advance to Final stages
3	Imperatriz	18	8	4	6	27	22	+5	28	Advance to Final stages
4	Confiança	18	7	5	6	22	22	0	26	Advance to Final stages
5	Ferroviário	18	7	4	7	21	20	+1	25	
6	Botafogo-PB	18	6	7	5	26	22	+4	25	
7	Santa Cruz	18	6	7	5	24	27	−3	25	
8	Treze	18	5	4	9	22	27	−5	19	
9	ABC	18	4	6	8	19	22	−3	18	Relegation to 2020 Campeonato Brasileiro Série D
10	Globo	18	4	4	10	19	27	−8	16	Relegation to 2020 Campeonato Brasileiro Série D

Source: CBF
Rules for classification: 1) points; 2) wins; 3) goal difference; 4) goals scored; 5) head-to-head results; 6) least red cards received; 7) least yellow cards received; 8) draw.

==== Results ====
Home \ Away	ABC	BOT	CON	FER	GLO	IMP	NAU	SAM	SAN	TRE
ABC	—	1–2	1–2	2–4	1–1	2–4	2–0	1–1	0–0	2–0
Botafogo-PB	1–1	—	2–0	1–1	3–1	2–1	0–1	1–2	1–1	4–2
Confiança	1–0	3–0	—	1–0	2–1	3–1	1–1	0–2	1–1	0–1
Ferroviário	1–2	0–0	2–2	—	1–0	2–1	0–1	0–1	3–0	3–2
Globo	0–2	0–3	2–0	2–0	—	1–1	2–0	0–1	3–3	3–1
Imperatriz	1–0	2–1	0–0	0–0	2–0	—	2–0	3–0	0–1	2–2
Náutico	1–1	2–1	3–1	0–1	2–2	4–2	—	2–1	3–1	1–0
Sampaio Corrêa	1–0	1–1	1–1	3–1	2–0	0–1	0–2	—	1–0	2–0
Santa Cruz	2–1	1–1	3–1	0–2	2–1	3–2	1–0	3–3	—	2–2
Treze	0–0	2–2	1–3	2–0	1–0	1–2	0–1	3–0	2–0	—

Source: CBF
Legend: Blue = home team win; Yellow = draw; Red = away team win.

=== Group B ===
Pos	Team	Pld	W	D	L	GF	GA	GD	Pts	Qualification or relegation
1	Ypiranga	18	7	7	4	18	10	+8	28	Advance to Final stages
2	Juventude	18	7	7	4	20	14	+6	28	Advance to Final stages
3	São José	18	6	10	2	25	17	+8	28	Advance to Final stages
4	Paysandu	18	6	10	2	18	11	+7	28	Advance to Final stages
5	Remo	18	6	9	3	19	14	+5	27	
6	Volta Redonda	18	6	7	5	22	19	+3	25	
7	Tombense	18	6	5	7	17	20	−3	23	
8	Boa Esporte	18	4	8	6	16	19	−3	20	
9	Luverdense	18	1	10	7	13	19	−6	13	Relegation to 2020 Campeonato Brasileiro Série D
10	Atlético Acreano	18	2	5	11	12	37	−25	11	Relegation to 2020 Campeonato Brasileiro Série D

Source: CBF
Rules for classification: 1) points; 2) wins; 3) goal difference; 4) goals scored; 5) head-to-head results; 6) least red cards received; 7) least yellow cards received; 8) draw.

==== Results ====
Home \ Away	ATL	BOA	JUV	LUV	PAY	REM	SAO	TOM	VOL	YPI
Atlético Acreano	—	0–0	0–2	3–2	1–1	0–2	2–2	2–1	1–2	1–1
Boa Esporte	0–0	—	2–0	0–0	2–0	2–2	2–2	0–1	1–1	2–1
Juventude	3–0	2–0	—	2–0	1–1	1–1	1–1	2–0	1–0	0–1
Luverdense	4–0	1–1	0–0	—	1–3	0–1	0–0	0–0	1–1	0–1
Paysandu	4–0	2–2	0–1	0–0	—	1–1	1–1	1–0	0–0	0–0
Remo	2–0	1–0	0–0	2–2	0–1	—	2–0	0–2	2–1	0–0
São José	3–0	2–0	1–1	2–0	1–1	1–0	—	2–0	4–2	0–0
Tombense	3–2	3–1	1–0	1–1	0–1	2–2	1–1	—	0–2	1–1
Volta Redonda	3–0	1–0	2–2	2–1	0–0	0–0	2–2	2–0	—	1–2
Ypiranga	2–0	0–1	4–1	0–0	0–1	1–1	2–0	0–1	2–0	—

Source: CBF
Legend: Blue = home team win; Yellow = draw; Red = away team win.

== Final Stages ==
Starting from the quarter-finals, the teams played a single-elimination tournament with the following rules:

- Each tie was played on a home-and-away two-legged basis, with the higher-seeded team hosting the second leg.
- If tied on aggregate, the away goals rule would not be used, extra time would not be played, and the penalty shoot-out would be used to determine the winner (Regulations Article 16).

Starting from the semi-finals, the teams were seeded according to their performance in the tournament. The teams were ranked according to overall points. If tied on overall points, the following criteria would be used to determine the ranking: 1. Overall wins; 2. Overall goal difference; 3. Draw in the headquarters of the Brazilian Football Confederation (Regulations Article 17).

=== Bracket ===
Quarter-finals
(Maranhão) Imperatriz	0	0	0
(Rio Grande do Sul) Juventude	0	4	4
(Pará) Paysandu	0	2	2 (3)
(Pernambuco) Náutico (p)	0	2	2 (5)
(Sergipe) Confiança	1	1	2
(Rio Grande do Sul) Ypiranga	0	1	1
(Rio Grande do Sul) São José	0	2	2
(Maranhão) Sampaio Corrêa	0	3	3

Semi-finals
(Rio Grande do Sul) Juventude	2	1	3 (3)
(Pernambuco) Náutico (p)	1	2	3 (4)
(Sergipe) Confiança	0	0	0
(Maranhão) Sampaio Corrêa	2	1	3

Finals
(Pernambuco) Náutico	3	2	5
(Maranhão) Sampaio Corrêa	1	2	3

=== Quarter-finals ===
The matches were played from 31 August to 9 September 2019.

Team 1	Agg.	Team 2	1st leg	2nd leg
Paysandu (Pará)	2–2 (3–5 p)	(Pernambuco) Náutico	0–0	2–2
Imperatriz (Maranhão)	0–4	(Rio Grande do Sul) Juventude	0–0	0–4
São José (Rio Grande do Sul)	2–3	(Maranhão) Sampaio Corrêa	0–0	2–3
Confiança (Sergipe)	2–1	(Rio Grande do Sul) Ypiranga	1–0	1–1

==== Group C ====
1 September 2019	Paysandu (Pará)	0–0	(Pernambuco) Náutico	Estádio Olímpico do Pará, Belém
18:00		https://www.cbf.com.br/futebol-brasileiro/competicoes/campeonato-brasileiro-serie-c/2019/181		Attendance: 22,815; Referee: Anderson Daronco (Rio Grande do Sul)

8 September 2019	Náutico (Pernambuco)	2–2 (5–3 p)	(Pará) Paysandu	Estádio dos Aflitos, Recife
18:00	Álvaro 64'; Jean Carlos 90+8' (pen.)	https://www.cbf.com.br/futebol-brasileiro/competicoes/campeonato-brasileiro-serie-c/2019/185	Vinícius Leite 24'; Nicolas 55'	Attendance: 16,662; Referee: Leandro Vuaden (Rio Grande do Sul)
	Penalties
	Jean Carlos (penalty scored); Jhonnatan (penalty scored); Willian Simões (penalty scored); Josa (penalty scored); Matheus Carvalho (penalty scored)		(penalty scored) Caíque Oliveira; (penalty scored) Tony; (penalty missed) Wellington Reis; (penalty scored) Uchôa

Tied 2–2 on aggregate, Náutico won on penalties and advanced to the semi-finals

==== Group D ====
2 September 2019	Imperatriz (Maranhão)	0–0	(Rio Grande do Sul) Juventude	Estádio Frei Epifânio D'Abadia, Imperatriz
20:00		https://www.cbf.com.br/futebol-brasileiro/competicoes/campeonato-brasileiro-serie-c/2019/182		Attendance: 8,769; Referee: Marcelo de Lima Henrique (Rio de Janeiro)

9 September 2019	Juventude (Rio Grande do Sul)	4–0	(Maranhão) Imperatriz	Estádio Alfredo Jaconi, Caxias do Sul
20:00	Renato Cajá 4', 17', 60'; Carlos Henrique 18'	https://www.cbf.com.br/futebol-brasileiro/competicoes/campeonato-brasileiro-serie-c/2019/186		Attendance: 18,413; Referee: Rodolpho Toski Marques (Paraná)

Juventude won 4–0 on aggregate and advanced to the semi-finals

==== Group E ====
31 August 2019	São José (Rio Grande do Sul)	0–0	(Maranhão) Sampaio Corrêa	Estádio Passo D'Areia, Porto Alegre
19:15		https://www.cbf.com.br/futebol-brasileiro/competicoes/campeonato-brasileiro-serie-c/2019/184		Attendance: 1,300; Referee: Ricardo Marques (Minas Gerais)

7 September 2019	Sampaio Corrêa (Maranhão)	3–2	(Rio Grande do Sul) São José	Castelão, São Luís
19:15	Rodrigo Andrade 12' (pen.); Salatiel 64'; Luiz Eduardo 78' (o.g.)	https://www.cbf.com.br/futebol-brasileiro/competicoes/campeonato-brasileiro-serie-c/2019/188	Lucão 62'; Matheusinho 65'	Attendance: 26,807; Referee: Luiz Flávio de Oliveira (São Paulo)

Sampaio Corrêa won 3–2 on aggregate and advanced to the semi-finals

==== Group F ====
31 August 2019	Confiança (Sergipe)	1–0	(Rio Grande do Sul) Ypiranga	Batistão, Aracaju
17:00	Tito 25'	https://www.cbf.com.br/futebol-brasileiro/competicoes/campeonato-brasileiro-serie-c/2019/183		Attendance: 11,899; Referee: Wagner do Nascimento Magalhães (Rio de Janeiro)

7 September 2019	Ypiranga (Rio Grande do Sul)	1–1	(Sergipe) Confiança	Estádio Olímpico Colosso da Lagoa, Erechim
17:00	Paulinho 19'	https://www.cbf.com.br/futebol-brasileiro/competicoes/campeonato-brasileiro-serie-c/2019/187	Vinícius Simon 84'	Attendance: 7,971; Referee: Raphael Claus (São Paulo)

Confiança won 2–1 on aggregate and advanced to the semi-finals

=== Semi-finals ===
Pos	Team	Pld	W	D	L	GF	GA	GD	Pts	Host
1	(Pernambuco) Náutico	20	10	5	5	26	20	+6	35	2nd leg
3	(Rio Grande do Sul) Juventude	20	8	8	4	24	14	+10	32	1st leg
2	(Maranhão) Sampaio Corrêa	20	10	5	5	25	21	+4	35	2nd leg
4	(Sergipe) Confiança	20	8	6	6	24	23	+1	30	1st leg

Source: CBF

The matches were played from 14 to 22 September 2019.

Team 1	Agg.	Team 2	1st leg	2nd leg
Juventude (Rio Grande do Sul)	3–3 (3–4 p)	(Pernambuco) Náutico	2–1	1–2
Confiança (Sergipe)	0–3	(Maranhão) Sampaio Corrêa	0–2	0–1

==== Group G ====
15 September 2019	Juventude (Rio Grande do Sul)	2–1	(Pernambuco) Náutico	Estádio Alfredo Jaconi, Caxias do Sul
18:00	Gabriel Poveda 69'; Eltinho 90+4'	https://www.cbf.com.br/futebol-brasileiro/competicoes/campeonato-brasileiro-serie-c/2019/190	Álvaro 36'	Attendance: 10,694; Referee: Ricardo Marques (Minas Gerais)

22 September 2019	Náutico (Pernambuco)	2–1 (4–3 p)	(Rio Grande do Sul) Juventude	Estádio dos Aflitos, Recife
18:00	Álvaro 16', 31'	https://www.cbf.com.br/futebol-brasileiro/competicoes/campeonato-brasileiro-serie-c/2019/192	Genílson 78'	Attendance: 13,084; Referee: Bráulio da Silva Machado (Santa Catarina)
	Penalties
	Jiménez (penalty scored); Josa (penalty scored); Maylson (penalty scored); Álvaro (penalty missed); Matheus Carvalho (penalty scored)		(penalty scored) Eltinho; (penalty scored) Genílson; (penalty scored) Rodríguez; (penalty missed) Denner; (penalty missed) Dalberto

Tied 3–3 on aggregate, Náutico won on penalties and advanced to the finals

==== Group H ====
14 September 2019	Confiança (Sergipe)	0–2	(Maranhão) Sampaio Corrêa	Batistão, Aracaju
17:00		https://www.cbf.com.br/futebol-brasileiro/competicoes/campeonato-brasileiro-serie-c/2019/189	Esquerdinha 21'; Salatiel 58'	Attendance: 13,705; Referee: Dewson Fernando Freitas da Silva (Pará)

21 September 2019	Sampaio Corrêa (Maranhão)	1–0	(Sergipe) Confiança	Castelão, São Luís
17:00	Vítor Salvador 69'	https://www.cbf.com.br/futebol-brasileiro/competicoes/campeonato-brasileiro-serie-c/2019/191		Attendance: 14,190; Referee: Rodolpho Toski Marques (Paraná)

Sampaio Corrêa won 3–0 on aggregate and advanced to the finals

=== Finals ===
Pos	Team	Pld	W	D	L	GF	GA	GD	Pts	Host
1	(Maranhão) Sampaio Corrêa	22	12	5	5	28	21	+7	41	2nd leg
2	(Pernambuco) Náutico	22	11	5	6	29	23	+6	38	1st leg

Source: CBF

The matches were played on 29 September and 6 October 2019.

Team 1	Agg.	Team 2	1st leg	2nd leg
Náutico (Pernambuco)	5–3	(Maranhão) Sampaio Corrêa	3–1	2–2

==== Group I ====
29 September 2019	Náutico (Pernambuco)	3–1	(Maranhão) Sampaio Corrêa	Estádio dos Aflitos, Recife
16:00	João Victor 28' (o.g.); Camutanga 55'; Jhonnatan 87'	Report	Roney 33'	Attendance: 16,148; Referee: Héber Lopes (Santa Catarina)

6 October 2019	Sampaio Corrêa (Maranhão)	2–2	(Pernambuco) Náutico	Castelão, São Luís
16:00	Everton 13'; Salatiel 82'	Report	Álvaro 51'; Matheus Carvalho 85'	Attendance: 26,809; Referee: Flávio Rodrigues de Souza (São Paulo)

== Top goalscorers ==
Rank	Player	Team	Goals
1	Eduardo	(Paraíba) Treze	8
1	Luiz Eduardo	(Rio Grande do Sul) São José	8
1	Negueba	(Rio Grande do Norte) Globo	8
1	Salatiel	(Maranhão) Sampaio Corrêa	8
5	Edson Cariús	(Ceará) Ferroviário	7
5	Felipe Alves	(Paraíba) Botafogo-PB	7
5	Jefinho	(Rio Grande do Norte) ABC	7
5	Matheus Lima	(Maranhão) Imperatriz	7
5	Pipico	(Pernambuco) Santa Cruz	7
10	Álvaro	(Pernambuco) Náutico	6
10	Núbio Flávio	(Rio de Janeiro (state)) Volta Redonda	6

Source: CBF
