= Muçum =

Municipality of Rio Grande do Sul, Brazil

- Municipality
- Flag Coat of arms

- Location within Rio Grande do Sul

- Location in Brazil
- Coordinates: 29°10′S 51°53′W
- Country: Brazil
- State: Rio Grande do Sul

Area
  - Total: 110,892 km^{2} (42,816 sq mi)
- Elevation: 77 m (253 ft)

Population (2022)
  - Total: 4,601
  - Density: 0.04149/km^{2} (0.1075/sq mi)
- Time zone: UTC−3 (BRT)
- Postal code: 95970-000

Muçum is a small town in the state of Rio Grande do Sul, Brazil.

Founded on January 31, 1959, also known as "Princesa das Pontes" (Princess of the Bridges) because of the railroad crossing Taquari river.

Settlers came to the town by Taquari river from Portugal, Italy, Germany and Poland.

== See also ==
- List of municipalities in Rio Grande do Sul
