= Talles (footballer) =

Brazilian footballer (born 1998)

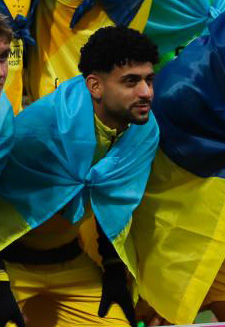

Personal information
- Full name: Talles Brener de Paula
- Date of birth: 12 May 1998 (age 28)
- Place of birth: Divinópolis, Brazil
- Height: 1.71 m (5 ft 7 in)
- Position: Midfielder

Team information
- Current team: Rukh Lviv
- Number: 30

Youth career
- 2012–2015: Inter de Limeira
- 2015–2016: Fluminense

Senior career*
Years	Team	Apps	(Gls)
2016–2017	Fluminense	0	(0)
2017	→ Mirassol (loan)	0	(0)
2017–2019	Mirassol	0	(0)
2019	→ Noroeste (loan)	14	(2)
2020	Vila Nova	31	(4)
2021	Olimpik Donetsk	13	(0)
2021–26	Rukh Lviv	74	(13)
2022	→ KuPS (loan)	8	(2)
2024–2025	→ Kashima Antlers (loan)	20	(1)
2026-	FC LNZ Cherkasy	6	(2)
- * Club domestic league appearances and goals as of 3/10/26 @ 15:28(AEST)

Talles Brener de Paula (born 12 May 1998), known as Talles or Talles Brener, is a Brazilian professional footballer who plays as a midfielder for Ukrainian Premier League club Rukh Lviv.

== Career ==
Talles is a product of the Inter de Limeira and Fluminense youth sportive systems.

In February 2021 he signed contract with the Ukrainian Premier League Olimpik Donetsk and made his debut for this team as a substituted second half-time player in the losing away match against Dynamo Kyiv on 13 February 2021.

Five months later, in July 2021, he was transferred to another team – FC Rukh Lviv, and made his debut for FC Rukh as the start squad player in an away win against MFC Mykolaiv on 21 September 2021 in the Round of 32 of the Ukrainian Cup.

On 2 April 2022, Talles joined KuPS in Finland on loan until 30 June 2022, with an option to extend the loan until the end of 2022.

In August 2024, Talles moved on loan to J1 League club Kashima Antlers for the remainder of the 2024 season.

== Career statistics ==
As of 23 September 2025

Appearances and goals by club, season and competition
Club	Season	League			State league		Cup (Note: Includes Copa do Brasil, Ukrainian Cup, Suomen Cup and Emperor's Cup)		League cup (Note: Includes Copa Paulista)		Continental		Total	
Club	Season	Division	Apps	Goals	Apps	Goals	Apps	Goals	Apps	Goals	Apps	Goals	Apps	Goals
Mirassol	2017						–		7	1	–		7	1
Mirassol	2018	Série D					–		9	0	–		9	0
Mirassol	2019						–		12	2	–		12	2
Mirassol	Total		0	0	0	0	0	0	28	3	0	0	28	3
Noroeste (loan)	2019				14 (Note: Includes Campeonato Paulista Série A3)	2	–		–		–		14	2
Vila Nova	2020	Série C	24	3	7 (Note: Includes Campeonato Goiano)	1	2	0	–		–		33	4
Olimpik Donetsk	2020–21	Ukrainian Premier League	13	0	–		–		–		–		13	0
Rukh Lviv	2021–22	Ukrainian Premier League	9	1	–		2	0	–		–		11	1
Rukh Lviv	2022–23	Ukrainian Premier League	28	6	–		–		–		–		28	6
Rukh Lviv	2023–24	Ukrainian Premier League	23	5	–		2	0	–		–		25	5
Rukh Lviv	Total		60	12	4	0	0	0	0	0	0	0	64	12
KuPS (loan)	2022	Veikkausliiga	8	2	–		2	0	0	0	0	0	10	2
Kashima Antlers (loan)	2024	J1 League	8	0	–		1	0	–		–		9	0
Kashima Antlers (loan)	2025	J1 League	12	1	2	0	–		–		–		14	1
Kashima Antlers (loan)	Total		20	1	2	0	1	0	0	0	0	0	23	1
Career total			125	18	27	3	9	0	28	3	0	0	185	24

== Honours ==
Vila Nova

- Série C: 2020

KuPS

- Finnish Cup: 2022

Kashima Antlers

- J1 League: 2025
