= João Diogo (footballer, born 1999) =

Brazilian footballer

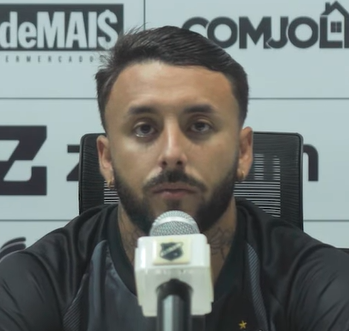
- João Diogo in 2025

Personal information
- Full name: João Diogo Jennings
- Date of birth: 13 January 1999 (age 27)
- Place of birth: Santarém, Brazil
- Height: 1.74 m (5 ft 9 in)
- Position: Winger

Team information
- Current team: Portuguesa
- Number: 99

Youth career
- Remo (futsal)
- 2015–2018: Cruzeiro
- 2018–2019: Figueirense

Senior career*
Years	Team	Apps	(Gls)
2019–2020	Figueirense	20	(3)
2019	→ Karpaty Lviv (loan)	12	(0)
2020	CRB	0	(0)
2020	Remo	2	(0)
2021	URT	13	(3)
2021	Manaus	8	(3)
2022	Caldense	10	(5)
2022	Botafogo-SP	21	(5)
2023	Aparecidense	26	(5)
2023	Sampaio Corrêa	2	(0)
2024	Santa Cruz	11	(3)
2024	São Bernardo	12	(1)
2024	Alverca	0	(0)
2025	Betim	10	(3)
2025	Santa Cruz	2	(0)
2025	Botafogo-PB	6	(0)
2026	ABC	11	(2)
2026–	Portuguesa	13	(1)
- * Club domestic league appearances and goals as of 14:47, 3 August 2026 (UTC)

João Diogo Jennings (born 13 January 1999), known as João Diogo, is a Brazilian footballer who plays as a winger for Portuguesa.

== Career ==
Born in Santarém, Pará, João Diogo played for the youth sides of Cruzeiro and Figueirense. After impressing with the latter's under-20 team, he was promoted to the main squad and renewed his contract until 2020 on 1 February 2019.

João Diogo made his senior debut on 24 February 2019, starting in a 1–1 Campeonato Catarinense home draw against Criciúma. He scored his first goal six days later, netting the winner in a 2–1 away success over Atlético Tubarão.

In August 2019, João Diogo signed a loan deal with the Ukrainian Premier League's Karpaty Lviv. Recalled in February 2020, he was released in July after just three appearances upon returning, due to "internal reasons".

On 28 July 2020, shortly after leaving Figueira, João Diogo signed for CRB. After two unused substitute appearances, he moved to Remo on 26 September, where he also only featured in two matches.

João Diogo began the 2021 season at URT, before being announced at Manaus on 17 June of that year. He agreed to a deal with Caldense on 18 November, and impressed with the side during the 2022 Campeonato Mineiro, scoring five goals in just ten appearances.

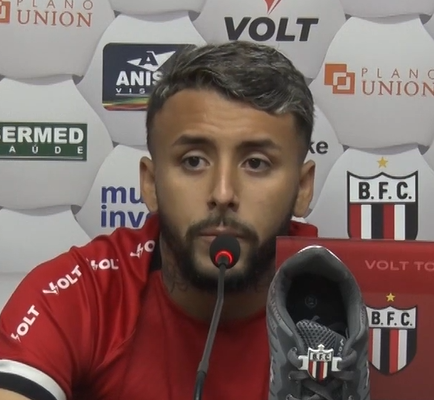
João Diogo as a Botafogo-SP player in 2022

On 30 March 2022, Série C side Botafogo-SP announced the signing of João Diogo. Regularly used as the club achieved promotion, he asked to leave in November after his sexual assault accusations, and signed for Aparecidense.

In September 2023, João Diogo left Aparecidense and joined Sampaio Corrêa. He moved to Santa Cruz on 10 December, and after impressing in the 2024 Campeonato Pernambucano, he left for São Bernardo in March of that year after failing to agree new terms.

On 2 September 2024, João Diogo signed for Portuguese side Alverca, but left on 28 December after failing to feature in a matchday squad. He began the 2025 campaign at Betim before returning to Santa on 29 March, but featured rarely for the latter and left on 6 June, signing for Botafogo-PB the following day.

On 27 October 2025, ABC announced the signing of João Diogo for the 2026 season. He left the club by mutual consent the following 27 March, and was announced by Portuguesa five days later.

== Personal life ==
On 26 September 2022, João Diogo and Botafogo-SP teammates Lucas Delgado and Dudu Hatamoto were accused of sexual assault in Rio de Janeiro. Delgado was released by the club two days later, while Dudu and João Diogo were punished by Botafogo.

== Career statistics ==
As of 3 August 2026

Club	Season	League			State League		Cup		Continental		Other		Total	
Club	Season	Division	Apps	Goals	Apps	Goals	Apps	Goals	Apps	Goals	Apps	Goals	Apps	Goals
Figueirense	2019	Série B	8	2	9	1	0	0	—		1 (Note: Appearance(s) in Recopa Catarinense)	0	18	3
Figueirense	2020	Série B	0	0	3	0	0	0	—		—		3	0
Figueirense	Total		8	2	12	1	0	0	—		1	0	21	3
Karpaty Lviv (loan)	2019–20	Ukrainian Premier League	12	0	—		1	0	—		—		13	0
CRB	2020	Série B	0	0	—		—		—		—		0	0
Remo	2020	Série C	2	0	—		—		—		—		2	0
URT	2021	Mineiro	—		13	3	—		—		—		13	3
Manaus	2021	Série C	8	3	—		—		—		—		8	3
Caldense	2022	Série D	—		10	5	—		—		—		10	5
Botafogo-SP	2022	Série C	21	5	—		—		—		3 (Note: Appearance(s) in Copa Paulista)	0	24	5
Aparecidense	2023	Série C	11	1	15	4	—		—		—		26	5
Sampaio Corrêa	2023	Série B	2	0	—		—		—		—		2	0
Santa Cruz	2024	Pernambucano	—		11	3	—		—		1 (Note: Appearance(s) in Copa do Nordeste)	0	12	3
São Bernardo	2024	Série C	12	1	—		—		—		—		12	1
Alverca	2024–25	Liga Portugal 2	0	0	—		0	0	—		—		0	0
Betim	2025	Mineiro	—		10	3	—		—		—		10	3
Santa Cruz	2025	Série D	2	0	—		—		—		—		2	0
Botafogo-PB	2025	Série C	6	0	—		—		—		—		6	0
ABC	2026	Série D	—		11	2	1	0	—		—		12	0
Portuguesa	2026	Série D	13	1	—		—		—		—		13	1
Career total			97	13	82	21	2	0	0	0	5	0	186	34

== Honours ==
Figueirense

- Recopa Catarinense: 2019
