= Salatiel (footballer) =

Brazilian footballer

Personal information
- Full name: Salatiel de Oliveira Gabriel Júnior
- Date of birth: September 20, 1992 (age 34)
- Place of birth: Ferraz de Vasconcelos, Brazil
- Height: 1.87 m (6 ft 2 in)
- Position: Forward

Team information
- Current team: Caxias

Youth career
- 2010: Votoraty
- 2011: Olé Brasil

Senior career*
Years	Team	Apps	(Gls)
2012	Guariba	4	(0)
2013	Itapirense	2	(0)
2013	Matonense	14	(4)
2014	Rio Branco-PR	8	(2)
2014	Inter de Bebedouro	2	(0)
2014	CRAC	4	(1)
2015	Dom Bosco	0	(0)
2016	São Carlos	17	(3)
2017	Panambi	7	(3)
2017–2018	Juazeirense	27	(11)
2019	Caldense	5	(0)
2019	Sampaio Corrêa	23	(8)
2020–2021	Náutico	25	(2)
2020	→ Remo (loan)	13	(5)
2021–2022	Londrina	51	(4)
2022–2023	Botafogo-SP	43	(9)
2024	Ituano	30	(2)
2025	Piracicaba	11	(2)
2025–2026	América-RN	22	(7)
2026–	Caxias	12	(5)
- * Club domestic league appearances and goals as of 11 November 2026

Salatiel de Oliveira Gabriel Júnior (born September 20, 1992) commonly known as Salatiel, is a Brazilian professional footballer who plays as a forward for Caxias.

== Club career ==
=== Remo ===
On loan from Náutico, Salatiel arrived at Remo for the 2020 Campeonato Brasileiro Série C. The striker made 13 appearances and scored five goals. He was one of the key players in the team's return to Série B after 13 years.

=== Botafogo-SP ===
In 2022, Salatiel signed for Botafogo-SP. He scored 9 goals in 43 games. He left the club at the end of 2023.

== Honours ==
Matonense

- Campeonato Paulista Série A4: 2013

Londrina

- Campeonato Paranaense: 2021
