= Xaves =

Brazilian footballer

Personal information
- Full name: Clennyson Silva do Nascimento
- Date of birth: February 27, 1986 (age 40)
- Place of birth: Balsas, Brazil
- Height: 1.74 m (5 ft 9 in)
- Position: Defensive midfielder

Team information
- Current team: Ponte Preta

Youth career
- 2002–2006: Paraná

Senior career*
Years	Team	Apps	(Gls)
2006–2007	Paraná	6	(0)
2007–	Desportivo Brasil		
2007–2008	→ Atlético Mineiro (Loan)	17	(0)
2008	→ Ipatinga (loan)		
2009	→ Ituano (loan)		
2009	→ Avaí (Loan)	2	(0)
2010	→ Boavista (loan)		
2010	→ Duque de Caxias (loan)	22	(0)
2011–present	→ Ponte Preta (loan)		
- * Club domestic league appearances and goals

Clennyson Silva do Nascimento (born February 27, 1986), known as Xaves, is a Brazilian professional footballer who plays as a defensive midfielder for Ponte Preta.

He made his professional debut for Paraná in a 3–0 home win over Grêmio in the Campeonato Brasileiro on May 13, 2007.
