= Neguete (footballer, born 1990) =

Brazilian footballer

Personal information
- Full name: Vinícius Lopes Laurindo
- Date of birth: 3 May 1990 (age 36)
- Place of birth: Belo Horizonte, Brazil
- Height: 1.96 m (6 ft 5 in)
- Position: Centre-back

Team information
- Current team: Remo

Youth career
- 2006–2008: América
- 2008–2009: Cruzeiro

Senior career*
Years	Team	Apps	(Gls)
2009–2012	Cruzeiro	2	(0)
2011	→ Tupi (loan)	0	(0)
2012–2015	Ferroviária	34	(0)
2015–2017	Juventude	23	(1)
2017–2018	Luverdense	18	(0)
2018	Água Santa	11	(0)
2018–2019	Foolad	4	(0)
2019	Persija Jakarta	0	(0)
2019	Vilafranquense	2	(0)
2020–	Remo	0	(0)
- * Club domestic league appearances and goals as of 19:32, 3 January 2020 (UTC)

Vinícius Lopes Laurindo (born 3 May 1990), better known as just Neguete, is a Brazilian professional footballer who plays as a centre back for Clube do Remo.

== Contract ==
- Cruzeiro.
