= Hélio Borges =

Brazilian footballer (born 2000)

Personal information
- Full name: Hélio Cunha Borges
- Date of birth: 15 May 2000 (age 26)
- Place of birth: Belém, Brazil
- Height: 1.74 m (5 ft 9 in)
- Position: Forward

Team information
- Current team: Novorizontino
- Number: 77

Youth career
- 2016–2019: Remo
- 2018–2019: → Palmeiras (loan)

Senior career*
Years	Team	Apps	(Gls)
2019–2021	Remo	25	(2)
2021–2023	Azuriz	12	(1)
2021	→ Ceará (loan)	2	(0)
2022	→ Juventude (loan)	4	(0)
2022	→ Novorizontino (loan)	18	(2)
2023	→ Ituano (loan)	35	(0)
2024	Gyeongnam	4	(0)
2025	Náutico	37	(6)
2026–	Novorizontino	14	(1)
- * Club domestic league appearances and goals as of 17 November 2026

Hélio Cunha Borges (born 15 May 2000), known as Hélio Borges or simply Hélio, is a Brazilian footballer who plays for Novorizontino. Mainly a forward, he can also play as a right back.

== Club career ==
Born in Belém, Pará, Hélio began his career with hometown side Remo before joining Palmeiras on 18 June 2018, on loan until April 2019. He returned to his parent club in March 2019, and was promoted to their first team.

Hélio made his first team debut on 31 March 2019, coming on as a second-half substitute for Alex Sandro in a 2–0 Campeonato Paraense home win against Paragominas. He scored his first goal on 21 August, netting in a 3–0 win against Sobradinho, for the year's Copa Verde.

After being a backup option, Hélio became a regular starter for Remo in the 2020 campaign, scoring twice in the 2020 Série C as his side achieved promotion. He left the in February 2021, and signed for Azuriz in March.

On 27 May 2021, Hélio moved to Série A side Ceará on loan until the end of the year. He made his debut in the category on 17 June, replacing Stiven Mendoza late into a 1–2 home loss against Bahia.

== Career statistics ==
As of 2 July 2021

Club	Season	League			State League		Cup		Continental		Other		Total	
Club	Season	Division	Apps	Goals	Apps	Goals	Apps	Goals	Apps	Goals	Apps	Goals	Apps	Goals
Remo	2019	Série C	1	0	1	0	—		—		5 (Note: Appearance(s) in Copa Verde)	1	7	1
Remo	2020	Série C	19	2	4	0	1	0	—		4	2	7	0
Remo	Total		20	2	5	0	1	0	—		9	3	29	5
Azuriz	2021	Paranaense	—		12	1	—		—		—		12	1
Ceará (loan)	2021	Série A	2	0	—		0	0	—		—		2	0
Career total			22	2	17	1	1	0	0	0	9	3	43	6

== Honours ==
Remo

- Campeonato Paraense: 2019

Novorizontino

- Campeonato Brasileiro Série B: 2026
