= PH (footballer) =

Brazilian footballer

Personal information
- Full name: Philippe Guimarães
- Date of birth: 18 March 1991 (age 35)
- Place of birth: Niterói, Brazil
- Height: 1.78 m (5 ft 10 in)
- Position: Defensive midfielder

Team information
- Current team: Amazonas

Youth career
- 2008–2011: Botafogo

Senior career*
Years	Team	Apps	(Gls)
2012	Resende	1	(0)
2012	Bangu	0	(0)
2013	Legião	10	(0)
2014	São Gonçalo EC	4	(0)
2015	Angra dos Reis	16	(0)
2015	Bangu	0	(0)
2016	America-RJ	15	(0)
2016	Kukësi	0	(0)
2017	Vila Nova	42	(0)
2018	Tombense	29	(0)
2018	→ Boa Esporte (loan)	9	(0)
2019	Ferroviária	5	(0)
2020	Paysandu	23	(2)
2021	Santo André	8	(0)
2021	Ferroviária	15	(0)
2022	Barra-SC	6	(0)
2022	Água Santa	3	(0)
2022	Botafogo-PB	11	(0)
2023–	Amazonas	44	(0)
2026	→ Nacional (loan)	6	(0)
- * Club domestic league appearances and goals as of 10 November 2026

Philippe Guimarães (born 18 March 1991), commonly known as PH, is a Brazilian footballer who plays as a defensive midfielder for Amazonas.
