= Fredson (footballer, born 1991) =

Brazilian footballer

Personal information
- Full name: Fredson Vinícius Santos Oliveira
- Date of birth: 30 November 1991 (age 34)
- Place of birth: Arauá, Brazil
- Height: 1.85 m (6 ft 1 in)
- Position: Centre back

Team information
- Current team: São José

Senior career*
Years	Team	Apps	(Gls)
2015	Colo Colo	4	(0)
2016	Boca Júnior	17	(1)
2016	Itabaiana	3	(0)
2017	Horizonte	5	(0)
2017–2018	Sampaio Corrêa	27	(3)
2019–2021	Remo	75	(7)
2022	Barra	10	(0)
2022	Ferroviário	17	(1)
2023	Portuguesa-RJ	9	(0)
2023	Campinense	8	(1)
2023–	São José	10	(0)
- * Club domestic league appearances and goals as of 1 October 2023

Fredson Vinícius Santos Oliveira (born 30 November 1991), or simply Fredson, is a Brazilian footballer who plays as a centre back for São José.

== Honours ==
Sampaio Corrêa

- Campeonato Maranhense: 2017
- Copa do Nordeste: 2018

Remo

- Campeonato Paraense: 2019
- Copa Verde: 2021
