= Luiz Felipe (footballer, born 1996) =

Brazilian footballer

Personal information
- Full name: Luiz Felipe Machado de Souza
- Date of birth: 5 October 1996 (age 30)
- Place of birth: Feira de Santana, Brazil
- Height: 1.80 m (5 ft 11 in)
- Position: Attacking midfielder

Youth career
- 2013: Red Bull Brasil
- 2013–2015: Avaí
- 2016: Atlético Goianiense

Senior career*
Years	Team	Apps	(Gls)
2016–2020	Atlético Goianiense	2	(0)
2016	→ Goiânia (loan)	6	(1)
2017	→ São Bernardo (loan)	4	(2)
2018	→ São Bernardo (loan)	4	(0)
2019–2020	→ Santa Cruz (loan)	12	(0)
2020–2021	Paysandu	20	(0)
2021	São Caetano	5	(0)
2021–2022	Ypiranga-RS	29	(2)
2022	Manaus	14	(0)
2022	Floresta	0	(0)
2023	Brasil de Pelotas	9	(1)
2023	Portuguesa	0	(0)
- * Club domestic league appearances and goals as of 19:05, 18 May 2023 (UTC)

Luiz Felipe Machado de Souza (born 5 October 1996), known as Luiz Felipe, is a Brazilian footballer who plays as an attacking midfielder.

== Club career ==
Born in Feira de Santana, Bahia, Luiz Felipe represented Red Bull Brasil, Avaí and Atlético Goianiense as a youth. He made his senior debut while on loan at Goiânia in the 2016 Campeonato Goiano Segunda Divisão, before returning to Atlético ahead of the 2017 season.

After featuring in just two matches for Dragão, Luiz Felipe had two loan spells at São Bernardo before joining Santa Cruz on 6 December 2018, also on loan. He left the latter club on 28 January 2020, and signed for fellow Série C side Paysandu on 6 February.

Luiz Felipe terminated his contract with Papão on 19 February 2021, and subsequently moved to São Caetano. On 2 June, he was presented at Ypiranga-RS, and renewed his contract with the club for a further year on 11 December.

On 18 April 2022, Luiz Felipe was announced at Manaus. After the club's elimination from the 2022 Série C, he moved to Floresta for the Copa Fares Lopes.

On 28 November 2022, Luiz Felipe agreed to a contract with Brasil de Pelotas. The following 15 May, he became the ninth addition of Portuguesa for the 2023 Copa Paulista.

== Career statistics ==
As of 1 November 2023

Club	Season	League			State League		Cup		Continental		Other		Total	
Club	Season	Division	Apps	Goals	Apps	Goals	Apps	Goals	Apps	Goals	Apps	Goals	Apps	Goals
Goiânia (loan)	2016	Goiano 2ª Divisão	—		6	1	—		—		—		6	1
Atlético Goianiense	2017	Série A	0	0	2	0	0	0	—		—		2	0
Atlético Goianiense	2018	Série A	0	0	0	0	0	0	—		—		0	0
Atlético Goianiense	Total		0	0	2	0	0	0	—		—		2	0
São Bernardo (loan)	2017	Série D	4	2	—		—		—		—		4	2
São Bernardo (loan)	2018	Paulista	—		4	0	—		—		11 (Note: Appearance(s) in Copa Paulista)	2	15	2
Santa Cruz (loan)	2019	Série C	2	0	10	0	3	0	—		7 (Note: Appearance(s) in Copa do Nordeste)	0	22	0
Santa Cruz (loan)	2020	Série C	0	0	0	0	0	0	—		0	0	0	0
Santa Cruz (loan)	Total		2	0	10	0	3	0	—		7	0	22	0
Paysandu	2020	Série C	13	0	7	0	0	0	—		2 (Note: Appearance(s) in Copa Verde)	0	22	0
São Caetano	2021	Paulista	—		5	0	—		—		—		5	0
Ypiranga-RS	2021	Série C	18	1	—		—		—		—		18	1
Ypiranga-RS	2022	Série C	0	0	11	1	—		—		—		11	1
Ypiranga-RS	Total		18	1	11	1	—		—		—		29	2
Manaus	2022	Série C	14	0	—		—		—		—		14	0
Floresta	2022	Série C	0	0	—		—		—		5 (Note: Appearance(s) in Copa Fares Lopes)	0	5	0
Brasil de Pelotas	2023	Série D	0	0	9	1	3	1	—		—		12	2
Portuguesa	2023	Paulista	—		0	0	—		—		8	1	8	1
Career total			51	3	54	3	6	1	0	0	33	3	144	10

== Honours ==
Paysandu

- Campeonato Paraense: 2020
