= Henan (footballer) =

Brazilian footballer (born 1987)

Personal information
- Full name: Henan Faria da Silveira
- Date of birth: 3 April 1987 (age 39)
- Place of birth: São Paulo, Brazil
- Height: 1.82 m (6 ft 0 in)
- Position: Forward

Team information
- Current team: Criciúma (on loan from Vila Nova)

Senior career*
| Years | Team | Apps | (Gls) |
| 2005 | União Barbarense | | |
| 2006–2008 | AC Lugano | | |
| 2008 | Bragantino | | |
| 2009 | SEV Hortolândia | | |
| 2010 | Red Bull Brasil | | |
| 2011 | → Atlético Paranaense (loan) | 4 | (0) |
| 2011–2012 | Comercial | 7 | (1) |
| 2012–2014 | Red Bull Brasil | 52 | (23) |
| 2012 | → Chunnam Dragons (loan) | 11 | (1) |
| 2013 | → Guarani (loan) | 9 | (1) |
| 2015–2016 | São Bernardo FC | 20 | (10) |
| 2015 | → Gangwon (loan) | 22 | (8) |
| 2016–2017 | Jeju United | 4 | (0) |
| 2017 | Santo André | 15 | (8) |
| 2017–2018 | Figueirense | 62 | (21) |
| 2019 | São Bento | 8 | (0) |
| 2019 | Botafogo-SP | 27 | (6) |
| 2020 | Ferroviária | 11 | (3) |
| 2020– | Vila Nova | 61 | (16) |
| 2021– | → Criciúma (loan) | 11 | (1) |
- * Club domestic league appearances and goals as of 17:10, 1 May 2019 (UTC)

Henan Faria da Silveira (born 3 April 1987) is a Brazilian footballer who plays as a forward for Criciúma, on loan from Vila Nova.
