= Júlio Rusch =

Brazilian footballer

Personal information
- Full name: Júlio Cezar Rusch
- Date of birth: 22 June 1997 (age 29)
- Place of birth: Candelaria, Brazil
- Height: 1.70 m (5 ft 7 in)
- Position: Defensive midfielder

Team information
- Current team: Amazonas

Youth career
- 2013–: Coritiba

Senior career*
Years	Team	Apps	(Gls)
2016–2021	Coritiba	32	(3)
2019	→ Figueirense (loan)	18	(3)
2020	→ Londrina (loan)	9	(0)
2020–2021	→ Remo (loan)	23	(0)
2021	→ São Bento (loan)	5	(0)
2021–2022	Inter de Limeira	28	(0)
2021	→ Manaus (loan)	10	(0)
2022	→ ABC (loan)	4	(0)
2023–	Amazonas	10	(0)
- * Club domestic league appearances and goals as of 9 December 2019

Júlio Cezar Rusch (born 22 June 1997), is a Brazilian professional footballer who plays as a defensive midfielder for Amazonas.

== Career ==
Rusch started his career in the Coritiba youth system. He played for the under-17 and under-19 teams. His professional debut came on 11 December 2016 against Ponte Preta. In 2017, he made it to the Brasileirão Sub-20 final.

== Honours ==
Coritiba

- Campeonato Paranaense: 2017

Figueirense

- Recopa Catarinense: 2019

Amazonas

- Campeonato Amazonense: 2023
