= Bruno Collaço =

Brazilian footballer (born 1990)

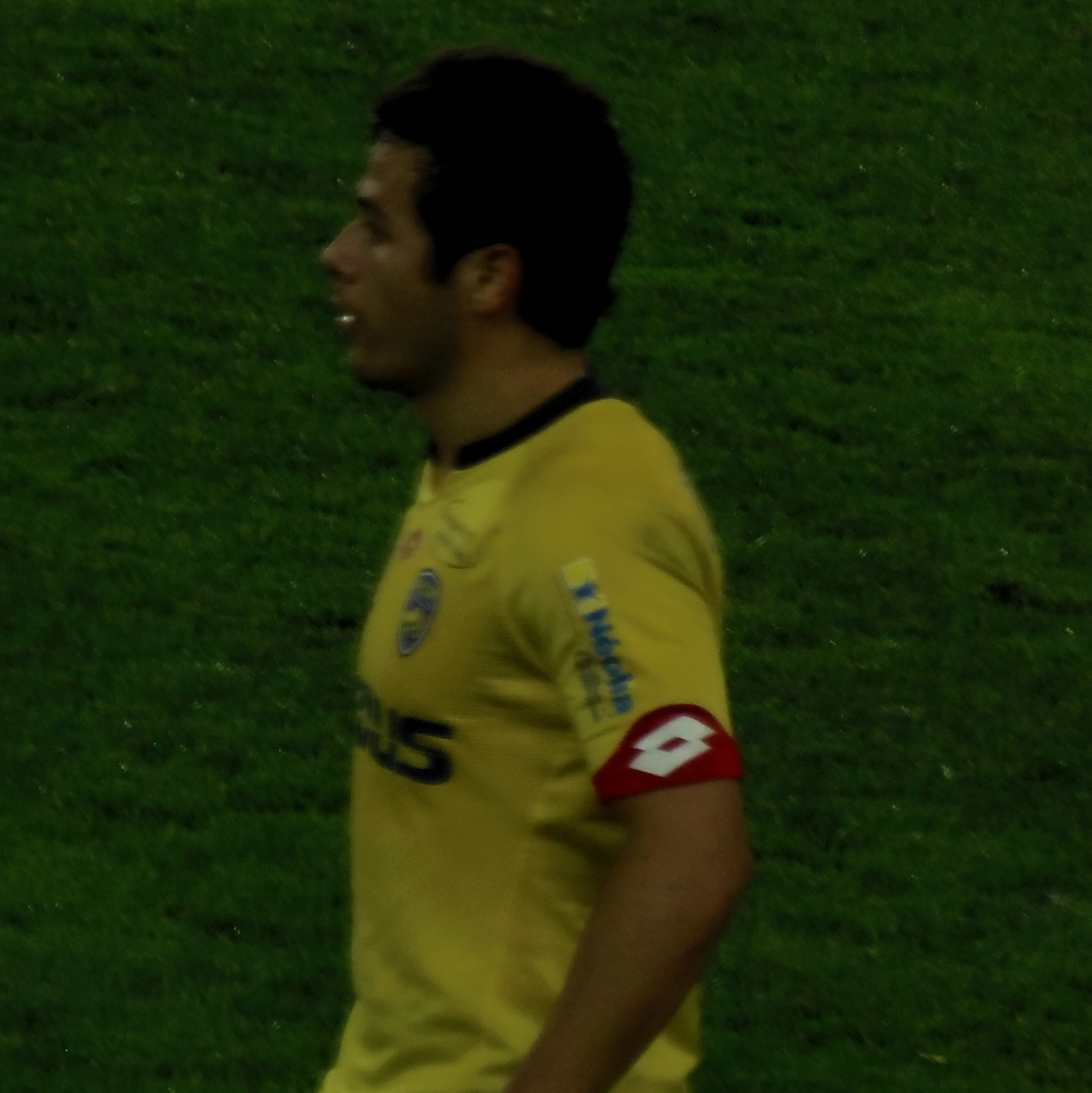

Personal information
- Full name: Bruno Bairros Collaço
- Date of birth: 8 March 1990 (age 36)
- Place of birth: São Leopoldo, Brazil
- Height: 1.75 m (5 ft 9 in)
- Position: Left back

Team information
- Current team: Altos

Youth career
- 1999–2009: Grêmio

Senior career*
Years	Team	Apps	(Gls)
2009–2013	Grêmio	63	(1)
2010	→ Ponte Preta (loan)	30	(2)
2012	→ Goiás (loan)	13	(0)
2013	→ Náutico (loan)	38	(0)
2014	Chapecoense	4	(0)
2014–2015	Joinville	6	(0)
2015	→ Sochaux (loan)	3	(0)
2015–2017	Sochaux	12	(0)
2017	Juventude	24	(0)
2018	Brasil de Pelotas	21	(0)
2019–2021	Paysandu	74	(0)
2021–2022	Vila Nova	31	(0)
2023	Campinense	18	(0)
2023–	Altos	8	(0)

International career
2007	Brazil U-17	3	(0)
- * Club domestic league appearances and goals as of 26 August 2023

Bruno Bairros Collaço (born 8 March 1990) is a Brazilian footballer who plays for Altos as a left back.

== Career ==
On 9 August 2009 he debuted for Grêmio in a match against Grêmio Prudente Futebol.
