= Gustavo Ermel =

Brazilian footballer (born 1995)

Personal information
- Date of birth: 29 March 1995 (age 31)
- Place of birth: Novo Hamburgo, Brazil
- Height: 1.65 m (5 ft 5 in)
- Position: Forward

Team information
- Current team: Uberlândia

Youth career
- Juventude

Senior career*
Years	Team	Apps	(Gls)
2013–2015	Juventude	16	(1)
2014	→ Figueirense (loan)	0	(0)
2015	→ Lajeadense (loan)	2	(0)
2015–2019	Figueirense	54	(5)
2018	→ Feirense (loan)	2	(0)
2018	→ Deportivo Capiatá (loan)	8	(0)
2019	Atlético Tubarão	13	(0)
2019	→ Atlético Acreano (loan)	13	(1)
2020	Remo	27	(4)
2020–2021	Joinville EC	21	(1)
2021	Barra	12	(1)
2022–2023	Retrô	28	(2)
2023–2025	Amazonas	23	(4)
2025	→ Manaus (loan)	13	(0)
2025	→ Pelotas (loan)	0	(0)
2026	North	5	(3)
2026–	Uberlândia	8	(0)
- * Club domestic league appearances and goals as of 12:19, 2 September 2020 (UTC)

Gustavo Ermel (born 29 March 1995) is a Brazilian professional footballer who plays as a forward for Uberlândia.

== Career ==
Ermel began his career with Juventude, appearing at various youth levels before being promoted into the first-team. He made his debut for the club in the 2013 Campeonato Gaúcho versus Cerâmica. He scored on his Série D debut in a 4–0 win against Tupi on 12 October 2013. Juventude finished 2nd in Série D and therefore won promotion to Série C. He appeared in fourteen games in his second season with Juventude but failed to score. Ermel agreed to join Figueirense on loan in 2014 which saw him feature for their U20s. In the following year, Ermel was sent on loan to Lajeadense for the 2015 Campeonato Gaúcho campaign.

He returned to Juventude at the conclusion of the Campeonato Gaúcho after making just two appearances. In 2015, Ermel completed a permanent move to former loan club Figueirense. For the rest of 2015 he appeared for the Figueirense U20s, as he did in 2014 whilst on loan, before making the step up to the club's first-team in 2016. 2016 saw Ermel make his senior debut for Figueirense in the Primeira Liga, before making his Série A debut on 15 May against Ponte Preta. His first league goal came on 25 May in a home draw versus Santos. On 29 June 2017, Ermel joined Primeira Liga side Feirense on loan.

After only three appearances, he returned to Figueirense on 2 February 2018. Four months later, Deportivo Capiatá of the Paraguayan Primera División completed the loan signing of Ermel. In January 2019, Ermel departed Figueirense permanently to join Atlético Tubarão. On 7 June 2019, he was loaned out to Atlético Acreano.

== Career statistics ==
As of 16 January 2019.

Appearances and goals by club, season and competition
Club	Season	League			National cup		League cup		Continental		Other		Total	
Club	Season	Division	Apps	Goals	Apps	Goals	Apps	Goals	Apps	Goals	Apps	Goals	Apps	Goals
Juventude	2013	Série D	3	1	0	0	—		—		1 (Note: Appearance(s) in the Campeonato Gaúcho)	0	4	1
Juventude	2014	Série C	4	0	0	0	—		—		9	0	13	0
Juventude	2015	Série C	0	0	0	0	—		—		0	0	0	0
Juventude	Total		7	1	0	0	—		—		10	0	17	1
Figueirense (loan)	2014	Série A	0	0	0	0	—		—		0	0	0	0
Lajeadense (loan)	2015	Série D	0	0	0	0	—		—		2	0	2	0
Figueirense	2015	Série A	0	0	0	0	—		—		0	0	0	0
Figueirense	2016	Série A	22	2	4	1	—		1 (Note: Appearance(s) in the Copa Sudamericana)	0	11 (Note: Appearance(s) in the Campeonato Catarinense and Primeira Liga)	0	38	3
Figueirense	2017	Série B	0	0	1	0	—		—		15	0	16	0
Figueirense	2018	Série B	0	0	2	0	—		—		3 (Note: Appearance(s) in the Campeonato Catarinense)	0	5	0
Figueirense	Total		22	2	7	1	—		1	0	29	0	59	3
Feirense (loan)	2017–18	Primeira Liga	2	0	0	0	1	0	—		0	0	3	0
Deportivo Capiatá (loan)	2018	Paraguayan Primera División	8	0	0	0	—		—		0	0	8	0
Atlético Tubarão	2019	Série D	0	0	0	0	—		—		0	0	0	0
Career total			39	3	7	1	1	0	1	0	41	0	89	4
