= Felipe Gedoz =

Brazilian footballer (born 1993)

Personal information
- Full name: Felipe Gedoz da Conceição
- Date of birth: 12 July 1993 (age 33)
- Place of birth: Muçum, Brazil
- Height: 1.77 m (5 ft 9 1/2 in)
- Positions: Attacking midfielder; winger

Youth career
- 2004–2006: Juventude

Senior career*
Years	Team	Apps	(Gls)
2011	Atlético Carazinho		
2011	Guarani-VA		
2011–2014	Defensor Sporting	44	(8)
2014–2016	Club Brugge	47	(7)
2017–2019	Atlético Paranaense	33	(9)
2018	→ Goiás (loan)	18	(4)
2019	→ Vitória (loan)	27	(5)
2020–2021	Nacional	5	(0)
2020	→ Remo (loan)	19	(2)
2021–2022	Remo	60	(10)
2022–2023	Brasiliense	5	(0)
2023	Santa Cruz	13	(3)
2023	Ypiranga Erechim	7	(0)

International career
2014	Brazil U21	2	(1)
2014–2015	Brazil U23	5	(1)
- * Club domestic league appearances and goals as of 18 June 2023

Felipe Gedoz da Conceição (born 12 July 1993), known as Felipe Gedoz, is a Brazilian professional footballer who plays as an attacking midfielder or as a winger.

== Club career ==
=== Early career ===
Born in Muçum, Gedoz joined Juventude's youth setup in 2004, aged 11. Two years later he left the club, and moved to Qatar and Saudi Arabia to play in youth tournaments. Returning to Brazil, he had failed trials at Flamengo and Criciúma.

Gedoz subsequently had spells at Atlético Carazinho and Guarani de Venâncio Aires, both of them in 2011.

=== Defensor Sporting ===
In 2011, Gedoz went on a trial at Uruguayan Primera División club Defensor Sporting. He was subsequently given a contract until 2014, and was initially assigned to the under-20s; in January 2012 he was promoted to the first team.

Gedoz made his professional debut for Defensor on 15 September 2012, coming on as a 71st-minute substitute for Aníbal Hernández in a 2–0 home win against Liverpool. He scored his first professional goal on 25 August 2013, netting the first in a 1–1 home draw against Peñarol, and scored his second on 6 October by netting the first in a 2–2 away draw against Cerro Largo.

Gedoz scored his first career double on 7 November 2013, netting his team's third and fourth in a 5–3 home success over Nacional. He made his continental debut on 19 February 2014, starting and scoring the second in a 4–1 home routing of Real Garcilaso for the Copa Libertadores championship.

Gedoz subsequently scored four goals in three matches during the space of only nine days: the first in a 2–1 home win against Miramar Misiones on 2 March, the second in a 5–1 away thrashing of Cerro Largo, and the third and fourth being all of his team's goals in a 2–0 Libertadores home win against Brazilian champions Cruzeiro.

Gedoz scored against Cruzeiro again on 21 March 2014, netting his team's first in a 2–2 away draw. He finished the campaign with 11 goals, seven in the league.

=== Club Brugge ===
On 27 August 2014, Gedoz signed a two-and-a-half-year contract with Belgian Pro League side Club Brugge, for a rumoured fee of US$ 1 million for 65% of the player's federative rights. He scored on his debut for the club on 14 September, netting the equalizer in a 1–1 draw at KRC Genk.

Gedoz made his UEFA Europa League debut on 18 September 2014, starting in a 0–0 home draw against Torino. He scored his first goal in the competition on 11 December, netting the first in a 2–1 home win against HJK through a penalty. He enjoyed a Belgian Cup accolade in the 2014-15, aside from the top tier title in 2015–16 and the Super Cup in 2016; in the latter, however, he failed to make the bench.

On 14 September 2016 Gedoz made his debut in the UEFA Champions League, replacing José Izquierdo in a 0–3 home loss against Premier League champions Leicester City.

== International career ==
In March 2014, Gedoz revealed that he would one day like to wear the kit of Brazil but that he was also open to suiting up for Uruguay if the call did come. In September, he declared his desire to play for the latter nation, but accepted a call-up from the former's under-21 squad on 8 October. Three days later, after making his debut, he confirmed his allegiance only to Brazil.

== Career statistics ==
As of 3 May 2017

Club	Season	League			Cup		Continental		Other		Total	
Club	Season	Division	Apps	Goals	Apps	Goals	Apps	Goals	Apps	Goals	Apps	Goals
Defensor Sporting	2012–13	Primera División	16	0	—		0	0	—		16	0
Defensor Sporting	2013–14	Primera División	26	7	—		11 (Note: Appearance(s) in Copa Libertadores)	4	—		27	11
Defensor Sporting	2014–15	Primera División	2	1	—		—		—		2	1
Defensor Sporting	Total		44	8	0	0	11	4	0	0	55	12
Club Brugge	2014–15	Belgian Pro League	20	5	6	3	9 (Note: Appearance(s) in UEFA Europa League)	1	—		35	9
Club Brugge	2015–16	Belgian Pro League	22	1	4	0	3	0	0	0	29	1
Club Brugge	2016–17	Belgian Pro League	5	1	1	1	3 (Note: Appearance(s) in UEFA Champions League)	0	0	0	9	2
Club Brugge	Total		47	7	11	4	15	1	0	0	73	12
Atlético Paranaense	2017	Série A	0	0	0	0	8	3	5 (Note: Appearance(s) in Campeonato Paranaense)	1	13	4
Career total			91	15	11	4	32	8	5	1	141	28

== Honours ==
Club Brugge

- Belgian Cup: 2014-15
- Belgian First Division A: 2015–16
- Belgian Super Cup: 2016

Remo

- Copa Verde: 2021
- Campeonato Paraense: 2022
