= Charles Almeida =

Brazilian footballer

Personal information
- Full name: Charles Raphael de Almeida
- Date of birth: 10 April 1995 (age 31)
- Place of birth: Rio de Janeiro, Brazil
- Height: 1.84 m (6 ft 0 in)
- Positions: Defensive midfielder; centre-back

Team information
- Current team: Operário Ferroviário
- Number: 32

Youth career
- 2012–2015: Macaé

Senior career*
Years	Team	Apps	(Gls)
2014–2018	Macaé	42	(1)
2018–2019	Santa Cruz	55	(6)
2019	→ Londrina (loan)	4	(0)
2020–2021	Remo	21	(2)
2021	São Caetano	11	(0)
2021	Jacuipense	10	(0)
2022	Retrô	14	(0)
2023	Portuguesa-RJ	9	(0)
2023	Manaus	6	(1)
2023–2024	Arema	29	(2)
2024	Volta Redonda	6	(0)
2025	Ypiranga	24	(2)
2025–	Operário Ferroviário	5	(0)
- * Club domestic league appearances and goals as of 18 November 2026

Charles Raphael de Almeida (born 10 April 1995), is a Brazilian professional footballer who plays as a defensive midfielder or centre-back for Brazilian club Operário Ferroviário.

== Honours ==
Remo

- Campeonato Paraense runner-up: 2020
- Campeonato Brasileiro Série C runner-up: 2020
