= Gilberto Alemão =

Brazilian footballer (born 1990)

Personal information
- Full name: Gilberto Carlos Marangoni Filho
- Date of birth: 1 February 1990 (age 36)
- Place of birth: São Miguel do Oeste, Brazil
- Height: 1.85 m (6 ft 1 in)
- Position: Centre-back

Team information
- Current team: XV de Novembro
- Number: 40

Senior career*
Years	Team	Apps	(Gls)
2012–2013	Rio Claro	35	(1)
2012	→AD Icasa (Loan)	21	(3)
2013–2014	Mogi Mirim	15	(3)
2014	Volta Redonda	14	(2)
2014–2015	AD Icasa	26	(1)
2015	Rio Claro	14	(2)
2015–2016	Bragantino	22	(3)
2016	Felda United	19	(1)
2017	Bragantino	22	(4)
2018	Novorizontino	1	(0)
2018	Botafogo-SP	5	(0)
2019–2020	XV de Novembro	47	(12)
2020	Clube do Remo	13	(1)
2021	Portuguesa	14	(0)
2022	CA Patrocinense	0	(0)
2022	GE Brasil	25	(0)
2023	Juventus	10	(1)
2023	ASA	7	(0)
2023–	XV de Novembro	24	(4)
- * Club domestic league appearances and goals as of 14 January 2025

Gilberto Carlos Marangoni Filho (born 1 February 1990), better known as Gilberto Alemão, is a Brazilian professional footballer who plays for XV de Novembro as a centre-back.
