= Lucas Siqueira =

Brazilian footballer (born 1988)

Personal information
- Full name: Lucas Santos Siqueira
- Date of birth: 23 September 1988 (age 38)
- Place of birth: Bom Jardim, Brazil
- Height: 1.81 m (5 ft 11 in)
- Position: Defensive midfielder

Team information
- Current team: Ituano

Youth career
- 2006–2007: Friburguense

Senior career*
| Years | Team | Apps | (Gls) |
| 2008–2015 | Friburguense | 123 | (19) |
| 2008 | → Sampaio Corrêa-RJ (loan) | | |
| 2009 | → Sampaio Corrêa-RJ (loan) | | |
| 2013 | → Macaé (loan) | 19 | (2) |
| 2014 | → Macaé (loan) | 18 | (2) |
| 2015 | → Vasco da Gama (loan) | 27 | (3) |
| 2016 | Paysandu | 52 | (8) |
| 2017 | Ceará | 8 | (1) |
| 2018 | Novorizontino | 10 | (7) |
| 2018–2019 | CRB | 49 | (3) |
| 2020 | Portuguesa | 9 | (0) |
| 2020–2021 | Remo | 85 | (9) |
| 2022– | Ituano | 56 | (1) |
- * Club domestic league appearances and goals as of 4 January 2022

Lucas Santos Siqueira (born 23 September 1988), known as Lucas Siqueira or simply Lucas, is a Brazilian footballer who plays as a defensive midfielder for Ituano.

== Honours ==
Macaé

- Campeonato Brasileiro Série C: 2014

Vasco da Gama

- Campeonato Carioca: 2015

Paysandu

- Copa Verde: 2016
- Campeonato Paraense: 2016

Ceará

- Campeonato Cearense: 2017

Remo

- Copa Verde: 2021
