= 2019 Clube do Remo season =

2019 season of Brazilian association football team

Remo
2019 season
- President: Fábio Bentes
- Coach: João Nasser (until 24 February 2019); Márcio Fernandes (until 26 August 2019); Eudes Pedro
- Stadium: Baenão; Mangueirão
- Campeonato Brasileiro Série C: 9th
- Campeonato Paraense: 1st
- Copa Verde: Semi-finals
- Copa do Brasil: First round
- Highest home attendance: 25,872 (vs. São José, 16 August 2019)
- Lowest home attendance: 3,044 (vs. São Raimundo-PA, 24 February 2019)
Home colors	Away colors

The 2019 season was Remo's 106th existence. The club participated in the Campeonato Brasileiro Série C, the Campeonato Paraense, the Copa Verde and the Copa do Brasil.

Remo finished outside of the top four of the Campeonato Brasileiro Série C (5th place in the group stage and 9th overall), but they won the Campeonato Paraense by the 46th time. In the Copa Verde, the club was eliminated in the semi-finals by Paysandu 3–1 in the aggregate. In the Copa do Brasil, Remo ended in the first round by Serra.

== Players ==
=== Squad information ===
Numbers in parentheses denote appearances as substitute.

As of 7 October 2019

Squad Number	Position	Nat.	Name	Date of Birth (Age)		
Squad Number	Position	Nat.	Name	Date of Birth (Age)	Apps	Goals
1	GK	BRA	Vinícius	9 November 1984 (aged 34)	37	0
2	DF	BRA	Cesinha	31 March 1994 (aged 25)	4	0
4	DF	BRA	Rafael Jansen	3 December 1988 (aged 30)	23	1
6	DF	BRA	Ronaell	25 November 1991 (aged 27)	16 (2)	1
7	FW	BRA	Gustavo Ramos	2 July 1996 (aged 23)	31 (4)	5
9	FW	BRA	Neto Baiano	17 September 1982 (aged 37)	8 (1)	5
10	MF	BRA	Eduardo Ramos	25 March 1986 (aged 33)	12 (1)	3
13	DF	BRA	Mimica	22 November 1985 (aged 33)	7	0
14	MF	BRA	Yuri	7 October 1989 (aged 30)	26	1
15	MF	BRA	Laílson	1 January 1998 (aged 21)	3 (4)	0
19	MF	BRA	Pingo	29 December 2001 (aged 17)	2	0
20	MF	BRA	Carlos Alberto	10 April 1995 (aged 24)	12 (1)	1
21	MF	BRA	Rafael Tufa	21 February 1992 (aged 27)	2 (3)	0
22	DF	BRA	Rony	12 April 2000 (aged 19)	0 (2)	0
34	DF	BRA	Cris	24 January 1988 (aged 31)	1	0
35	FW	BRA	Hélio Borges	15 May 2000 (aged 19)	1 (6)	0
40	MF	BRA	Zotti	23 May 1985 (aged 34)	8 (4)	1
44	DF	BRA	Marcão	17 August 1995 (aged 24)	27	3
78	GK	BRA	Thiago Coelho	26 May 1995 (aged 24)	2	0
80	MF	BRA	Djalma	1 June 1992 (aged 27)	16 (6)	1
87	MF	BRA	Ramires	14 February 1987 (aged 32)	21 (2)	1
89	MF	BRA	Dedeco	7 January 1989 (aged 30)	11 (3)	0
90	DF	BRA	Fredson	30 November 1991 (aged 27)	21 (1)	2
93	MF	BRA	Guilherme Garré	20 March 1993 (aged 26)	4 (6)	1
97	FW	BRA	Wesley	10 February 1993 (aged 26)	6 (3)	3
99	FW	BRA	Higor	7 April 1998 (aged 21)	0 (1)	0
Players left the club during the playing season
2	DF	BRA	Geovane	8 August 1995 (aged 24)	14	1
5	MF	BRA	Robson	26 February 1992 (aged 27)	4	0
8	MF	BRA	Diogo Sodré	21 March 1991 (aged 28)	5 (6)	0
9	FW	BRA	Emerson Carioca	7 December 1995 (aged 23)	18 (6)	4
10	MF	BRA	Wallacer	3 June 1986 (aged 32)	2	0
10	MF	BRA	Douglas Packer	13 March 1987 (aged 32)	12 (1)	1
11	FW	BRA	Alex Sandro	20 August 1995 (aged 24)	6 (15)	4
12	GK	BRA	Evandro Gigante	15 November 1985 (aged 33)	0	0
16	DF	BRA	Tiago Félix	4 October 1992 (aged 26)	8	0
17	MF	PAR	Eduardo Echeverría	4 March 1989 (aged 30)	6 (3)	3
18	MF	BRA	Welton	22 November 1998 (aged 20)	4 (1)	0
22	MF	BRA	Vacaria	4 April 1994 (aged 25)	4 (2)	0
25	FW	BRA	Henrique	27 September 1993 (aged 25)	4 (3)	0
26	DF	BRA	Daniel Vançan	25 October 1996 (aged 22)	10 (4)	1
27	DF	BRA	Michel	9 April 1990 (aged 29)	1 (1)	0
30	DF	BRA	Kevem	3 March 2000 (aged 19)	10 (1)	1
36	DF	BRA	Victor Luiz	3 April 1997 (aged 21)	0	0
71	FW	BRA	Mário Sérgio	2 September 1995 (aged 23)	7 (7)	2
77	FW	BRA	David Batista	13 April 1989 (aged 30)	2 (4)	0
77	FW	BRA	Danillo Bala	5 May 1993 (aged 26)	1 (4)	0
85	DF	BRA	Gabriel Cassimiro	29 September 1993 (aged 25)	3 (2)	0
91	FW	BRA	Marcão Assis	25 September 1985 (aged 33)	3 (3)	0
95	MF	BRA	Samuel	16 January 1995 (aged 24)	2 (2)	1
96	FW	BRA	Cleberson Tiarinha	23 February 1996 (aged 23)	0	0
99	FW	BRA	Edno	31 May 1983 (aged 35)	2 (1)	0

=== Top scorers ===
As of 7 October 2019

Place	Position	Name	Campeonato Brasileiro Série C	Campeonato Paraense	Copa Verde	Copa do Brasil	Total
1	FW	Neto Baiano	1	0	4	0	5
1	FW	Gustavo Ramos	2	2	1	0	5
3	FW	Alex Sandro	2	2	0	0	4
3	FW	Emerson Carioca	1	2	1	0	4
5	FW	Wesley	1	0	2	0	3
5	MF	Eduardo Ramos	2	0	1	0	3
5	MF	Echeverría	0	3	0	0	3
5	DF	Marcão	3	0	0	0	3
9	FW	Mário Sérgio	0	2	0	0	2
9	DF	Fredson	2	0	0	0	2
11	MF	Guilherme Garré	1	0	0	0	1
11	MF	Zotti	1	0	0	0	1
11	MF	Carlos Alberto	1	0	0	0	1
11	MF	Douglas Packer	0	1	0	0	1
11	MF	Djalma	0	1	0	0	1
11	MF	Samuel	0	1	0	0	1
11	MF	Yuri	0	1	0	0	1
11	MF	Ramires	1	0	0	0	1
11	DF	Daniel Vançan	1	0	0	0	1
11	DF	Ronaell	0	0	1	0	1
11	DF	Geovane	0	1	0	0	1
11	DF	Rafael Jansen	0	1	0	0	1
11	DF	Kevem	0	1	0	0	1
Own goals			0	0	1	0	1

=== Disciplinary record ===
As of 7 October 2019

Position	Name	Campeonato Brasileiro Série C		Campeonato Paraense		Copa Verde		Copa do Brasil		Total	
Position	Name	Booked	Sent off (straight red)	Booked	Sent off (straight red)	Booked	Sent off (straight red)	Booked	Sent off (straight red)	Booked	Sent off (straight red)
MF	Vacaria	0	0	4	1	0	0	1	0	5	1
MF	Robson	0	0	1	0	0	0	2	1	3	1
MF	Echeverría	0	0	1	1	0	0	1	0	2	1
FW	Wesley	1	1	0	0	1	0	0	0	2	1
FW	David Batista	0	0	1	1	0	0	0	0	1	1
DF	Rafael Jansen	3	0	5	0	0	0	0	0	8	0
DF	Marcão	5	0	2	0	1	0	0	0	8	0
MF	Yuri	6	0	0	0	2	0	0	0	8	0
DF	Fredson	4	0	1	0	2	0	0	0	7	0
MF	Djalma	1	0	5	0	0	0	1	0	7	0
FW	Gustavo Ramos	3	0	4	0	0	0	0	0	7	0
FW	Emerson Carioca	3	0	2	0	1	0	0	0	6	0
DF	Ronaell	3	0	1	0	1	0	0	0	5	0
MF	Zotti	3	0	0	0	2	0	0	0	5	0
DF	Daniel Vançan	4	0	0	0	0	0	0	0	4	0
DF	Kevem	0	0	4	0	0	0	0	0	4	0
DF	Geovane	1	0	2	0	0	0	0	0	3	0
MF	Guilherme Garré	2	0	0	0	1	0	0	0	3	0
FW	Neto Baiano	1	0	0	0	2	0	0	0	3	0
DF	Mimica	0	0	1	0	1	0	0	0	2	0
MF	Ramires	2	0	0	0	0	0	0	0	2	0
MF	Douglas Packer	1	0	1	0	0	0	0	0	2	0
MF	Diogo Sodré	0	0	2	0	0	0	0	0	2	0
FW	Alex Sandro	1	0	1	0	0	0	0	0	2	0
DF	Gabriel Cassimiro	1	0	0	0	0	0	0	0	1	0
MF	Eduardo Ramos	1	0	0	0	0	0	0	0	1	0
MF	Carlos Alberto	1	0	0	0	0	0	0	0	1	0
MF	Pingo	0	0	1	0	0	0	0	0	1	0
FW	Mário Sérgio	0	0	1	0	0	0	0	0	1	0
GK	Vinícius	1	0	0	0	0	0	0	0	1	0
GK	Thiago Coelho	1	0	0	0	0	0	0	0	1	0
GK	Evandro Gigante	1	0	0	0	0	0	0	0	1	0
	TOTALS	50	1	40	3	14	0	5	1	109	5

== Kit ==
Supplier: Topper / Main sponsor: VeganNation

Home	Home alt. 1	Home alt. 2	Away	Away alt. 1

== Transfers ==
=== Transfers in ===
Position	Name	From	Source
DF	Geovane	(Brazil) Globo	
MF	Robson	(Brazil) Ypiranga	
GK	Thiago Coelho	(Brazil) VOCEM	
DF	Ronaell	(Brazil) Cuiabá	
MF	Diogo Sodré	(Brazil) Luverdense	
MF	Djalma	(Brazil) Carajás	
DF	Fredson	(Brazil) Sampaio Corrêa	
FW	Henrique	(Brazil) Oeste	
MF	Eduardo Echeverría	(Brazil) CSA	
DF	Rafael Jansen	(Brazil) Boa Esporte	
MF	Wallacer	(Brazil) Criciúma	
MF	Samuel	(Brazil) Tuna Luso	
DF	Tiago Félix	(Brazil) Pinheirense	
FW	Alex Sandro	(Brazil) Globo	
MF	Welton	(Brazil) Londrina (loan)	
FW	Gustavo Ramos	(Brazil) Red Bull Brasil	
FW	Mário Sérgio	(Brazil) Botafogo-PB	
MF	Vacaria	(Brazil) Juventude	
FW	David Batista	(Saudi Arabia) Al-Mujazzal	
FW	Emerson Carioca	(Brazil) Itaboraí Profute	
DF	Victor Luiz	(Bulgaria) Septemvri Sofia	
DF	Marcão	(Portugal) Marítimo (loan)	
MF	Douglas Packer	(Indonesia) Barito Putera	
MF	Yuri	(Brazil) Mirassol	
MF	Ramires	(Brazil) Villa Nova	
FW	Hélio Borges	(Brazil) Palmeiras (loan return)	
FW	Edno	Free agent	
FW	Cleberson Tiarinha	(Brazil) Vitória da Conquista (loan)	
DF	Daniel Vançan	(Brazil) Ferroviária (loan)	
MF	Rafael Tufa	(Brazil) Portuguesa Santista (loan)	
MF	Carlos Alberto	(Brazil) Portuguesa Santista (loan)	
DF	Michel	(Brazil) Paragominas	
FW	Danillo Bala	(Brazil) CRB	
MF	Zotti	(Brazil) Villa Nova	
MF	Guilherme Garré	(Brazil) Santo André (loan)	
FW	Marcão Assis	(Brazil) São Luiz	
MF	Eduardo Ramos	(Brazil) Cuiabá	
FW	Higor	(Brazil) Santos (loan)	
DF	Gabriel Cassimiro	(Brazil) Boavista (loan)	
DF	Cris	(Brazil) Ríver (loan)	
FW	Neto Baiano	(Brazil) Vitória	
FW	Wesley	(Brazil) Cianorte (loan)	
DF	Cesinha	(Brazil) Santa Cruz	

=== Transfers out ===
Position	Name	To	Source
FW	Jayme	(Brazil) Boa Esporte	
MF	Wallacer	(Indonesia) Persipura Jayapura	
MF	Welton	Free agent	
DF	Victor Luiz	(Brazil) Londrina	
FW	Henrique	(Brazil) Moto Club	
DF	Kevem	(Brazil) Mirassol	
FW	Edno	(Brazil) Brasiliense	
MF	Eduardo Echeverría	(Brazil) Volta Redonda	
FW	David Batista	(Brazil) Joinville	
MF	Vacaria	(Brazil) Pelotas	
MF	Diogo Sodré	(Cyprus) Onisilos Sotira 2014	
MF	Robson	(Brazil) Treze	
MF	Samuel	Free agent	
MF	Douglas Packer	(Malta) Valletta	
DF	Michel	(Brazil) Juventude Samas	
FW	Mário Sérgio	Free agent	
FW	Cleberson Tiarinha	(Brazil) Mixto	
DF	Geovane	Free agent	
DF	Gabriel Cassimiro	Free agent	
FW	Alex Sandro	Free agent	
FW	Danillo Bala	Free agent	
FW	Marcão Assis	Free agent	
DF	Daniel Vançan	(Brazil) Sport	
FW	Emerson Carioca	Free agent	
GK	Evandro Gigante	(Brazil) Cametá	

Notes

1. David Batista joined Joinville following his release.
2. Edno joined Brasiliense following his release.
3. Victor Luiz joined Londrina following his release.
4. Vacaria joined Pelotas following his release.
5. Diogo Sodré joined Onisilos Sotira 2014 following his release.
6. Michel joined Juventude-MA following his release.

== Competitions ==
Competition	First match	Last match	Starting round	Final position	Record							
Competition	First match	Last match	Starting round	Final position	Pld	W	D	L	GF	GA	GD	Win %
Campeonato Brasileiro Série C	27 April 2019	25 August 2019	Group stage	9th	18	6	9	3	19	14	+5	33.33
Campeonato Paraense	26 January 2019	21 April 2019	Group stage	Winners	14	7	5	2	18	7	+11	50.00
Copa Verde	13 August 2019	6 October 2019	Round of 16	Semi-finals	6	2	1	3	11	7	+4	33.33
Copa do Brasil	13 February 2019		First round	First round	1	0	0	1	0	1	−1	0.00
Total					39	15	15	9	48	29	+19	38.46

Source: Competitions

=== Campeonato Brasileiro Série C ===
==== Group stage ====
Pos	Team	Pld	W	D	L	GF	GA	GD	Pts	Qualification or relegation
3	São José	18	6	10	2	25	17	+8	28	Advance to Final stages
4	Paysandu	18	6	10	2	18	11	+7	28	Advance to Final stages
5	Remo	18	6	9	3	19	14	+5	27	
6	Volta Redonda	18	6	7	5	22	19	+3	25	
7	Tombense	18	6	5	7	17	20	−3	23	

Source: CBF
Rules for classification: 1) points; 2) wins; 3) goal difference; 4) goals scored; 5) head-to-head results; 6) least red cards received; 7) least yellow cards received; 8) draw.

===== Matches =====
27 April 2019 1	Remo	1–0	Boa Esporte	Belém
19:15 UTC−3	Alex Sandro 62'; Douglas Packer (yellow card) 63'; Yuri (yellow card) 90+3'	Report	Claudeci (yellow card) 39'; Tsunami (yellow card) 66'; Anderson (yellow card) 67'	Stadium: Mangueirão; Attendance: 7,398; Referee: Ivan da Silva Guimarães Júnior

4 May 2019 2	Juventude	1–1	Remo	Caxias do Sul
17:15 UTC−3	John Lennon 33'; Sidimar (yellow card) 69'	Report	Fredson 16', (yellow card) 69'	Stadium: Estádio Alfredo Jaconi; Attendance: 2,817; Referee: Paulo Henrique de Melo Salmazio

11 May 2019 3	Luverdense	0–1	Remo	Lucas do Rio Verde
17:15 UTC−3	Hélder (yellow card) 82'	Report	Yuri (yellow card) 26'; Emerson Carioca 58', (yellow card) 72'; Ronaell (yellow card) 89'	Stadium: Estádio Passo das Emas; Attendance: 921; Referee: Ramon Abatti

20 May 2019 4	Remo	0–0	Ypiranga	Belém
20:00 UTC−3	Daniel Vançan (yellow card) 89'	Report	Henrique Pedrozo (yellow card) 42'; Quirino (yellow card) 68'; Fábio (yellow card) 70'; Fidélis (yellow card) 84'	Stadium: Mangueirão; Attendance: 15,084; Referee: Lucas Canetto Bellote

26 May 2019 5	Remo	2–0	Atlético Acreano	Belém
16:00 UTC−3	Marcão 17'; Gustavo Ramos 27'	Report		Stadium: Mangueirão; Attendance: 14,203; Referee: Adriano Barros Carneiro

3 June 2019 6	Tombense	2–2	Remo	Tombos
20:00 UTC−3	Judivan (yellow card) 12'; Everton Galdino 34', 87'; Felipe Cordeiro (yellow card) 36'; Augusto Recife (yellow card) 44'	Report	Marcão (yellow card) 7'; Daniel Vançan 45'; Geovane (yellow card) 45+2'; Carlos Alberto 79'; Emerson Carioca (yellow card) 85'; Zotti (yellow card) 86'	Stadium: Almeidão; Attendance: 769; Referee: Ricarle Gustavo Gonçalves Batista

8 June 2019 7	Remo	2–1	Volta Redonda	Belém
17:00 UTC−3	Marcão 33'; Rafael Jansen (yellow card) 38'; Yuri (yellow card) 84'; Gustavo Ramos 89'	Report	Bileu (yellow card) 24'; Heitor (yellow card) 46', (goal) 85'; João Carlos (yellow card) 77' (yellow-red card) 78'; Wandinho (yellow card) 86'	Stadium: Mangueirão; Attendance: 16,339; Referee: Cláudio Francisco Lima e Silva

13 June 2019 8	São José	1–0	Remo	Porto Alegre
20:00 UTC−3	Matheusinho (yellow card) 19'; Tiago Pedra (yellow card) 69'; Dudu Mandai 72'; Diguinho (yellow card) 73'; Rafael Carrilho (yellow card) 90+3'	Report	Carlos Alberto (yellow card) 68'; Marcão (yellow card) 81'; Fredson (yellow card) 90+1'	Stadium: Estádio Passo D'Areia; Attendance: 332; Referee: William Machado Steffen

23 June 2019 9	Remo	0–1	Paysandu	Belém
18:00 UTC−3	Ramires (yellow card) 3'; Gustavo Ramos (yellow card) 14'; Marcão (yellow card) 56'	Report	Thiago Primão (yellow card) 18'; Anderson Uchôa 74'	Stadium: Mangueirão; Attendance: 23,763; Referee: Vinícius Furlan

29 June 2019 10	Boa Esporte	2–2	Remo	Varginha
19:15 UTC−3	Pedrinho 24', (yellow card) 58'; Gustavo Henrique (yellow card) 33'; Rodrigo Souza (yellow card) 75'; Tsunami 83'	Report	Fredson 7'; Alex Sandro 65'; Yuri (yellow card) 77'; Daniel Vançan (yellow card) 85'; Vinícius (yellow card) 87'	Stadium: Melão; Attendance: 659; Referee: Lucas Paulo Torezin

6 July 2019 11	Remo	0–0	Juventude	Belém
18:00 UTC−3	Marcão (yellow card) 42'; Rafael Jansen (yellow card) 44'	Report	Felippe (yellow card) 28'; Rafael Jataí (yellow card) 39'; Aprile (yellow card) 41'; Dalberto (yellow card) 58'; Diego Ivo (yellow card) 72'	Stadium: Mangueirão; Attendance: 12,287; Referee: Mayron Frederico dos Reis Novais

13 July 2019 12	Remo	2–2	Luverdense	Belém
15:00 UTC−3	Fredson (yellow card) 42'; Eduardo Ramos (yellow card) 56', (goal) 90+5'; Emerson Carioca (yellow card) 61'; Guilherme Garré (yellow card) 73'; Marcão 76'; Daniel Vançan (yellow card) 86'; Rafael Jansen (yellow card) 90+2'	Report	Anderson Ligeiro 7'; Douglas Oliveira (yellow card) 8'; Kauê 9', (yellow card) 46'; Hélder (yellow card) 61'; Gabriel Honório (yellow card) 85'	Stadium: Baenão; Attendance: 11,955; Referee: Gilberto Rodrigues Castro Júnior

19 July 2019 13	Ypiranga	1–1	Remo	Erechim
20:00 UTC−3	Reinaldo Dutra 64' (pen.); Saimon (yellow card) 67'; Roger (yellow card) 78'; Fidélis (yellow card) 90+1'	Report	Gabriel Cassimiro (yellow card) 43'; Guilherme Garré 48'; Djalma (yellow card) 55'; Ramires (yellow card) 63'; Gustavo Ramos (yellow card) 64'	Stadium: Estádio Olímpico Colosso da Lagoa; Attendance: 192; Referee: Djalma Alves de Lima Filho

27 July 2019 14	Atlético Acreano	0–2	Remo	Rio Branco
19:15 UTC−3	Igor (yellow card) 55'; Kássio (yellow card) 59'; Marcus Carioca (yellow card) 63'; Marquinhos (yellow card) 74'	Report	Ronaell (yellow card) 51'; Ramires 55'; Alex Sandro (yellow card) 58'; Eduardo Ramos 64'; Marcão (yellow card) 75'; Guilherme Garré (yellow card) 81'	Stadium: Florestão; Attendance: 266; Referee: Célio Amorim

1 August 2019 15	Remo	0–2	Tombense	Belém
20:00 UTC−3	Yuri (yellow card) 23'	Report	Everton Galdino 47', (yellow card) 73'; Marquinhos (yellow card) 57'; Judivan (yellow card) 63'; Felipe Garcia (yellow card) 65'; Willian Rocha 78'; Lucas de Sá (yellow card) 86'	Stadium: Mangueirão; Attendance: 18,010; Referee: Rodrigo Batista Raposo

9 August 2019 16	Volta Redonda	0–0	Remo	Volta Redonda
20:00 UTC−3	Douglas Lima (red card) 10'; Gedeílson (yellow card) 74'; Luiz Paulo (yellow card) 88'	Report	Wesley (red card) 10'; Neto Baiano (yellow card) 70'; Ronaell (yellow card) 77'; Zotti (yellow card) 89'	Stadium: Estádio Raulino de Oliveira; Attendance: 876; Referee: Marcelo Aparecido Ribeiro de Souza

16 August 2019 17	Remo	2–0	São José	Belém
20:00 UTC−3	Gustavo Ramos (yellow card) 11'; Zotti 58', (yellow card) 65'; Thiago Coelho (yellow card) 59'; Neto Baiano 84' (pen.); Evandro Gigante (yellow card) 90+2'	Report	Rafael Carrilho (yellow card) 63'; Wágner (yellow card) 90+2'	Stadium: Mangueirão; Attendance: 25,872; Referee: Luiz César de Oliveira Magalhães

25 August 2019 18	Paysandu	1–1	Remo	Belém
18:00 UTC−3	Micael (yellow card) 13'; Hygor (yellow card) 39'; Vinícius Leite 73'; Thiago Primão (yellow card) 80'	Report	Wesley 7', (yellow card) 8'; Daniel Vançan (yellow card) 30'; Fredson (yellow card) 33'; Yuri (yellow card) 79'	Stadium: Mangueirão; Attendance: 30,242; Referee: Luiz Flávio de Oliveira

=== Campeonato Paraense ===
==== Group stage ====
Pos	Team	Pld	W	D	L	GF	GA	GD	Pts	Qualification or relegation
1	Remo (A)	10	5	4	1	15	6	+9	19	Advance to the Final stage
2	Bragantino (A)	10	4	3	3	14	11	+3	15	Advance to the Final stage
3	Águia de Marabá	10	3	4	3	11	11	0	13	
4	Castanhal	10	2	5	3	5	7	−2	11	
5	São Francisco (R)	10	1	3	6	13	24	−11	6	2020 Paraense 2nd Division

Source: Globo Esporte
(A) Advance to a further round; (R) Relegated

===== Matches =====
26 January 2019 1	São Raimundo	0–2	Remo	Santarém
20:00 UTC−3	Glauber (yellow card) 9'; Rubran (yellow card) 15'	Report	Mimica (yellow card) 11'; Diogo Sodré (yellow card) 31'; Samuel 37'; Rafael Jansen 77'	Stadium: Estádio Colosso do Tapajós; Attendance: 2,265; Referee: Andrey da Silva e Silva

3 February 2019 2	Remo	1–0	Tapajós	Belém
16:00 UTC−3	Geovane 34'; Robson (yellow card) 90'; Gustavo Ramos (yellow card) 90+5'	Report	Júnior (yellow card) 27'	Stadium: Mangueirão; Attendance: 17,560; Referee: Gustavo Ramos Melo
Note: This match, originally scheduled for 20 January 2019, was postponed 2 weeks due to security issues after incidents at the stadium.

9 February 2019 3	Independente	0–4	Remo	Tucuruí
17:00 UTC−3	Willian Fazendinha (yellow card) 58'; Davi (yellow card) 58'; Wellington Cabeça (yellow card) 66' (yellow-red card) 71'	Report	Echeverría 13'; Ronaell (yellow card) 38'; Vacaria (yellow card) 58'; Gustavo Ramos 72', 75'; Emerson Carioca (yellow card) 83'; Djalma 88'	Stadium: Navegantão; Attendance: 1,839; Referee: Joelson Nazareno Ferreira Cardoso

17 February 2019 4	Remo	0–3	Paysandu	Belém
16:00 UTC−3	David Batista (yellow card) 7', (red card) 21'; Vacaria (yellow card) 41' (yellow-red card) 90+2'; Rafael Jansen (yellow card) 45'; Gustavo Ramos (yellow card) 57'	Report	Rafael Jansen 12' (o.g.); Paulo Rangel 35'; Bruno Collaço (yellow card) 41'; Caíque Oliveira (yellow card) 53'; Bruno Oliveira (yellow card) 57'; Mota (yellow card) 59'; Nicolas 74'	Stadium: Mangueirão; Attendance: 16,684; Referee: Dewson Fernando Freitas da Silva

21 February 2019 5	Paragominas	1–1	Remo	Paragominas
20:00 UTC−3	Otávio (yellow card) 21'; Kaique (yellow card) 24'; Felipinho (yellow card) 36'; Paulo Rafael (yellow card) 36'; Michel 42'	Report	Kevem 23', (yellow card) 51'; Djalma (yellow card) 41'	Stadium: Estádio Arena do Município Verde; Attendance: 1,447; Referee: Andrey da Silva e Silva

24 February 2019 6	Remo	3–0	São Raimundo	Belém
16:00 UTC−3	Echeverría 2' (pen.); Gustavo Ramos (yellow card) 60'; Djalma (yellow card) 79'; Mário Sérgio 89'; Alex Sandro 90'	Report	Clayton Sales (yellow card) 1'; Leandro Mendes (yellow card) 60'; Rubran (yellow card) 77'; Irlan (yellow card) 90+2'	Stadium: Mangueirão; Attendance: 3,044; Referee: Djonaltan Costa de Araújo

7 March 2019 7	Tapajós	0–0	Remo	Santarém
20:00 UTC−3		Report	Diogo Sodré (yellow card) 32'; Alex Sandro (yellow card) 38'; Rafael Jansen (yellow card) 90+3'	Stadium: Estádio Colosso do Tapajós; Attendance: 219; Referee: Gustavo Ramos Melo

16 March 2019 8	Remo	1–1	Independente	Belém
16:00 UTC−3	Mário Sérgio 42'	Report	Charles (yellow card) 59'; Joãozinho 83' (pen.)	Stadium: Mangueirão; Attendance: 4,081; Referee: Marco José Soares de Almeida

24 March 2019 9	Paysandu	1–1	Remo	Belém
16:00 UTC−3	Diego Matos 45', (yellow card) 90+2'; Marcos Antônio (yellow card) 67'; Micael (yellow card) 72'; Paulo Rangel (yellow card) 73'	Report	Douglas Packer 21'; Geovane (yellow card) 43'; Rafael Jansen (yellow card) 90+2'; Djalma (yellow card) 90+4'	Stadium: Mangueirão; Attendance: 14,561; Referee: Joelson Nazareno Ferreira Cardoso

31 March 2019 10	Remo	2–0	Paragominas	Belém
16:00 UTC−3	Echeverría 30' (pen.), (yellow card) 43'; Emerson Carioca 52'; Mário Sérgio (yellow card) 53'; Fredson (yellow card) 65'; Pingo (yellow card) 82'	Report	Ilaílson (yellow card) 67'; Michel (yellow card) 72'; Wilker (yellow card) 79'	Stadium: Mangueirão; Attendance: 7,647; Referee: Wasley do Couto Leão

==== Final stage ====
===== Semi-finals =====
3 April 2019 First leg	Bragantino	0–1	Remo	Bragança
15:30 UTC−3		Report	Kevem (yellow card) 51'; Emerson Carioca 90+3'	Stadium: Diogão; Attendance: 4,580; Referee: Gustavo Ramos Melo

7 April 2019 Second leg	Remo	0–0 (1–0 agg.)	Bragantino	Belém
16:00 UTC−3	Djalma (yellow card) 2'; Douglas Packer (yellow card) 34'; Kevem (yellow card) 61'; Geovane (yellow card) 80'	Report	Ricardo Capanema (yellow card) 6'; Paulo de Tárcio (yellow card) 33'; Lukinha (yellow card) 34'; Marco Goiano (yellow card) 35'; Esquerdinha (yellow card) 73'	Stadium: Mangueirão; Attendance: 15,259; Referee: Wasley do Couto Leão

===== Finals =====
14 April 2019 First leg	Independente	1–0	Remo	Belém
16:00 UTC−3	Marcão 6' (o.g.); Jeferson Jari (yellow card) 41'; Charles (yellow card) 69'; Daelson (yellow card) 90'	Report	Emerson Carioca (yellow card) 23'; Marcão (yellow card) 77'; Djalma (yellow card) 79'; Rafael Jansen (yellow card) 81'; Echeverría (red card) 86'	Stadium: Mangueirão; Attendance: 8,840; Referee: Gustavo Ramos Melo

21 April 2019 Second leg	Remo	2–0 (2–1 agg.)	Independente	Belém
16:00 UTC−3	Yuri 7'; Kevem (yellow card) 14'; Rafael Jansen (yellow card) 57'; Gustavo Ramos (yellow card) 58'; Marcão (yellow card) 64'; Alex Sandro 85'	Report	Charles (yellow card) 20'; Jeferson Jari (yellow card) 25'; Joãozinho (yellow card) 64'	Stadium: Mangueirão; Attendance: 24,321; Referee: Dewson Fernando Freitas da Silva

=== Copa Verde ===
==== Round of 16 ====
13 August 2019 First leg	Sobradinho	1–0	Remo	Ceilândia
15:00 UTC−3	Carlos Henrique 86'	Report	Mimica (yellow card) 60'; Emerson Carioca (yellow card) 70'	Stadium: Abadião; Attendance: 0 Referee: Felipe Duarte Varejão

21 August 2019 Second leg	Remo	3–0 (3–1 agg.)	Sobradinho	Belém
20:30 UTC−3	Gustavo Ramos 38'; Zotti (yellow card) 76'; Jaílton 80' (o.g.); Emerson Carioca 90+3'	Report		Stadium: Mangueirão; Attendance: 5,560; Referee: Fábio Santos de Santana

==== Quarter-finals ====
3 September 2019 First leg	Atlético Acreano	2–1	Remo	Rio Branco
21:00 UTC−3	Marquinhos 58'; Kássio (yellow card) 66'; Geovani 84'; Jovambert (yellow card) 85'; Ocimar (yellow card) 85'	Report	Eduardo Ramos 45'; Yuri (yellow card) 67'; Guilherme Garré (yellow card) 89'	Stadium: Florestão; Attendance: 178; Referee: Valdicleuson Silva da Costa

15 September 2019 Second leg	Remo	6–1 (7–3 agg.)	Atlético Acreano	Belém
15:00 UTC−3	Wesley 1', 41'; Neto Baiano 18', 62' (pen.), 90'; Fredson (yellow card) 52'; Ronaell 68'	Report	Matheus (yellow card) 9'; Igor (yellow card) 42'; Jovambert 45+2'	Stadium: Baenão; Attendance: 12,732; Referee: Paulo Henrique de Melo Salmazio

==== Semi-finals ====
29 September 2019 First leg	Remo	0–0	Paysandu	Belém
16:00 UTC−3	Wesley (yellow card) 34'; Neto Baiano (yellow card) 44'; Marcão (yellow card) 60'; Zotti (yellow card) 88'	Report	Léo Baiano (yellow card) 52'; Anderson Uchôa (yellow card) 54'; Tony (yellow card) 63'; Elielton (red card) 87'; Giovanni (yellow card) 89'	Stadium: Mangueirão; Attendance: 16,595; Referee: Dewson Fernando Freitas da Silva

6 October 2019 Second leg	Paysandu	3–1 (3–1 agg.)	Remo	Belém
16:00 UTC−3	Caíque Oliveira (yellow card) 20'; Bruno Collaço (yellow card) 37'; Wellington Reis (yellow card) 39'; Hygor 59', (yellow card) 60'; Thiago Primão (yellow card) 62'; Perema (yellow card) 85'; Nicolas 90'; Léo Baiano 90+3'	Report	Neto Baiano (yellow card) 20', (goal) 82'; Yuri (yellow card) 27'; Ronaell (yellow card) 77'; Fredson (yellow card) 90+4'	Stadium: Mangueirão; Attendance: 21,287; Referee: Wilton Sampaio

=== Copa do Brasil ===
==== First round ====
13 February 2019	Serra	1–0	Remo	Serra
19:30 UTC−3	Peu (yellow card) 36'; Gilmar Baiano (yellow card) 39'; Rael 51'; Renato Oliveira (yellow card) 85'; Joelson (yellow card) 90+3'	Report	Robson (yellow card) 31' (yellow-red card) 46'; Vacaria (yellow card) 33'; Echeverría (yellow card) 52'; Djalma (yellow card) 80'	Stadium: Robertão; Attendance: 1,484; Referee: André Rodrigo Rocha
