= 2019 Campeonato Paraense finals =

- Event: 2019 Campeonato Paraense
Independente	Remo
1	2
- on aggregate

First leg
Independente	Remo
1	0
- Date: 14 April 2019
- Venue: Mangueirão, Belém
- Referee: Gustavo Ramos Melo
- Attendance: 8,840

Second leg
Remo	Independente
2	0
- Date: 21 April 2019
- Venue: Mangueirão, Belém
- Referee: Dewson Fernando Freitas da Silva
- Attendance: 24,321

The 2019 Campeonato Paraense finals was the final that decided the 2019 Campeonato Paraense, the 107th season of the Campeonato Paraense. The final were contested between Independente and Remo.

Remo defeated Independente 2–1 on aggregate to win their 46th Campeonato Paraense title.

== Road to the final ==
Note: In all scores below, the score of the home team is given first.

Independente			Round	Remo		
Opponent	Venue	Score		Opponent	Venue	Score
Group A2			Group stage	Group A1		
Pos / Team / Pld / Pts; 1 / Paysandu (A) / 10 / 22; 2 / Independente (A) / 10 / 17; 3 / Paragominas / 10 / 16; 4 / Tapajós / 10 / 8; 5 / São Raimundo (R) / 10 / 4; Source: Globo Esporte (A) Advance to a further round; (R) Relegated			Group stage	Pos / Team / Pld / Pts; 1 / Remo (A) / 10 / 19; 2 / Bragantino (A) / 10 / 15; 3 / Águia de Marabá / 10 / 13; 4 / Castanhal / 10 / 11; 5 / São Francisco (R) / 10 / 6; Source: Globo Esporte (A) Advance to a further round; (R) Relegated		
Paysandu (won 3–2 on aggregate)	Home	3–1	Semi-finals	Bragantino (won 1–0 on aggregate)	Away	0–1
Paysandu (won 3–2 on aggregate)	Away	1–0	Semi-finals	Bragantino (won 1–0 on aggregate)	Home	0–0

== Format ==
The finals were played on a home-and-away two-legged basis. If tied on aggregate, the penalty shoot-out was used to determine the winner.

== Matches ==
=== First leg ===
14 April 2019
16:00 UTC−3

Independente	1–0	Remo
Marcão 6' (o.g.)	Report

Mangueirão, Belém
Attendance: 8,840
Referee: Gustavo Ramos Melo

Independente	Remo

GK	12	(Brazil) Redson
DF	13	(Brazil) Daelson	(yellow card) 90'
DF	14	(Brazil) Charles	(yellow card) 69'
DF	3	(Brazil) Dedé
DF	6	(Brazil) Mocajuba
MF	7	(Brazil) Jeferson Jari	(yellow card) 41'
MF	8	(Brazil) Chicão (c)	(substituted off) 63'
MF	10	(Brazil) Renatinho
MF	16	(Brazil) Araújo	(substituted off) 83'
FW	11	(Brazil) Tiago Mandi	(substituted off) 69'
FW	9	(Brazil) Joãozinho
Substitutes:
MF	15	(Brazil) Willian Fazendinha	(substituted in) 82'
MF	18	(Brazil) Davi	(substituted in) 69'
MF	20	(Brazil) Wellington Cabeça	(substituted in) 63'
Coach:
(Brazil) Charles Guerreiro

GK	1	(Brazil) Vinícius (c)
DF	2	(Brazil) Geovane
DF	30	(Brazil) Kevem
DF	44	(Brazil) Marcão		(yellow card) 77'
DF	4	(Brazil) Rafael Jansen		(yellow card) 81'
MF	14	(Brazil) Yuri
MF	89	(Brazil) Dedeco		(substituted off) 84'
MF	80	(Brazil) Djalma		(yellow card) 79'
MF	10	(Brazil) Douglas Packer
FW	7	(Brazil) Gustavo Ramos		(substituted off) 46'
FW	9	(Brazil) Emerson Carioca	(yellow card) 23'	(substituted off) 64'
Substitutes:
MF	17	(Paraguay) Eduardo Echeverría	(red card) 86'	(substituted in) 64'
FW	11	(Brazil) Alex Sandro		(substituted in) 84'
FW	99	(Brazil) Edno		(substituted in) 46'
Coach:
(Brazil) Márcio Fernandes

Assistant referees:
Hélcio Araújo Neves (Pará)
Rafael Ferreira Vieira (Pará)
Fourth official:
Melck Müller Soares de Almeida (Pará)
Fifth official:
Ignácio José de Almeida Pedro (Pará)

=== Second leg ===
21 April 2019
16:00 UTC−3

Remo	2–0	Independente
Yuri 7'; Alex Sandro 85'	Report

Mangueirão, Belém
Attendance: 24,321
Referee: Dewson Fernando Freitas da Silva

Remo	Independente

GK	1	(Brazil) Vinícius (c)
DF	2	(Brazil) Geovane
DF	30	(Brazil) Kevem	(yellow card) 14'
DF	44	(Brazil) Marcão	(yellow card) 64'
DF	4	(Brazil) Rafael Jansen	(yellow card) 57'
MF	14	(Brazil) Yuri
MF	80	(Brazil) Djalma	(substituted off) 54'
MF	10	(Brazil) Douglas Packer	(substituted off) 88'
FW	7	(Brazil) Gustavo Ramos	(yellow card) 58'
FW	71	(Brazil) Mário Sérgio
FW	9	(Brazil) Emerson Carioca	(substituted off) 66'
Substitutes:
MF	87	(Brazil) Ramires	(substituted in) 88'
MF	8	(Brazil) Diogo Sodré	(substituted in) 54'
FW	11	(Brazil) Alex Sandro	(substituted in) 66'
Coach:
(Brazil) Márcio Fernandes

GK	12	(Brazil) Redson
DF	13	(Brazil) Daelson
DF	4	(Brazil) Charles	(yellow card) 20'	(substituted off) 79'
DF	3	(Brazil) Dedé
DF	6	(Brazil) Mocajuba
MF	5	(Brazil) Jeferson Jari		(yellow card) 25'
MF	7	(Brazil) Chicão (c)
MF	14	(Brazil) Renatinho
MF	10	(Brazil) Araújo
FW	11	(Brazil) Joãozinho	(yellow card) 64'	(substituted off) 71'
FW	9	(Brazil) Tiago Mandi		(substituted off) 60'
Substitutes:
MF	15	(Brazil) Willian Fazendinha		(substituted in) 71'
MF	18	(Brazil) Davi		(substituted in) 60'
MF	20	(Brazil) Wellington Cabeça		(substituted in) 79'
Coach:
(Brazil) Charles Guerreiro

Assistant referees:
Márcio Gleidson Correia Dias (Pará)
José Ricardo Guimarães Coimbra (Pará)

== See also ==
- 2020 Copa Verde
- 2020 Copa do Brasil
