= 2020 Copa Verde finals =

- Event: 2020 Copa Verde
Brasiliense	Remo
(Federal District (Brazil))	(Pará)
3	3
- on aggregate Brasiliense won 5–4 on penalties

First leg
Brasiliense	Remo
2	1
- Date: 21 February 2021
- Venue: Estádio Nacional Mané Garrincha, Brasília
- Referee: Dyorgines José Padovani de Andrade
- Attendance: 0

Second leg
Remo	Brasiliense
2	1
- Date: 24 February 2021
- Venue: Mangueirão, Belém
- Referee: Jefferson Ferreira de Moraes
- Attendance: 0

The 2020 Copa Verde finals was the final two-legged tie that decided the 2020 Copa Verde, the 7th season of the Copa Verde, Brazil's regional cup football tournament organised by the Brazilian Football Confederation.

The finals were contested in a two-legged home-and-away format between Brasiliense, from Distrito Federal, and Remo, from Pará.

Brasiliense won the first leg 2–1, and Remo won the second leg by the same score, which meant the title was decided by a penalty shoot-out, which Brasiliense won 5–4 to claim their first Copa Verde title.

== Teams ==
Team	Previous finals appearances (bold indicates winners)
(Federal District (Brazil)) Brasiliense	None
(Pará) Remo	1 (2015)

=== Road to the final ===
Note: In all scores below, the score of the finalist is given first.

(Federal District (Brazil)) Brasiliense			Round	(Pará) Remo		
Opponent	Venue	Score		Opponent	Venue	Score
(Espírito Santo) Vitória	Home	4–0	First round	Bye		
(Mato Grosso) Luverdense	Away	2–1	Round of 16	(Federal District (Brazil)) Gama	Home	1–0
(Goiás) Atlético Goianiense (won 5–2 on aggregate)	Away	2–1	Quarter-finals	(Pará) Independente (tied 3–3 on aggregate, won 3–0 on penalties)	Home	2–0
(Goiás) Atlético Goianiense (won 5–2 on aggregate)	Home	3–1	Quarter-finals	(Pará) Independente (tied 3–3 on aggregate, won 3–0 on penalties)	Away	1–3
(Goiás) Vila Nova (tied 3–3 on aggregate, won 5–3 on penalties)	Away	2–0	Semi-finals	(Amazonas (Brazilian state)) Manaus (won 7–3 on aggregate)	Away	1–1
(Goiás) Vila Nova (tied 3–3 on aggregate, won 5–3 on penalties)	Home	1–3	Semi-finals	(Amazonas (Brazilian state)) Manaus (won 7–3 on aggregate)	Home	6–2

== Format ==
The finals were played on a home-and-away two-legged basis. If tied on aggregate, the penalty shoot-out was used to determine the winner.

== Matches ==
=== First leg ===
21 February 2021
15:30 BRT (UTC−3)

Brasiliense (Federal District (Brazil))	2–1	(Pará) Remo
Sandy 31'; Aldo 79'	Report	Wallace 22'

Estádio Nacional Mané Garrincha, Brasília
Attendance: 0
Referee: Dyorgines José Padovani de Andrade (Espírito Santo)

**Brasiliense**	**Remo**

GK	1	(Brazil) Edmar Sucuri
DF	2	(Brazil) Diogo
DF	3	(Brazil) Badhuga
DF	4	(Brazil) Keynan
DF	6	(Brazil) Peu
MF	5	(Brazil) Aldo
MF	8	(Brazil) Sandy	(yellow card) 61'	(substituted off) 80'
MF	10	(Brazil) Zotti (c)		(substituted off) 46'
MF	7	(Brazil) Luquinhas		(substituted off) 65'
MF	11	(Brazil) Maicon Assis		(substituted off) 73'
FW	9	(Brazil) Zé Eduardo		(substituted off) 73'
Substitutes:
GK	12	(Brazil) Fernandes
DF	13	(Brazil) Preto Costa
DF	14	(Brazil) Gustavo Henrique
MF	15	(Brazil) Radamés		(substituted on) 80'
MF	17	(Brazil) Carlos Eduardo		(substituted on) 73'
MF	22	(Brazil) Tobinha		(substituted on) 65'
FW	16	(Brazil) Peninha
FW	18	(Brazil) Bruno Nunes
FW	19	(Brazil) Rodrigo Fumaça
FW	20	(Brazil) Jefferson Maranhão		(substituted on) 46'
FW	21	(Brazil) Michel Platini		(substituted on) 73'
Coach:
(Brazil) Vílson Taddei

GK	1	(Brazil) Vinícius
DF	2	(Brazil) Wellington Silva
DF	3	(Brazil) Fredson
DF	4	(Brazil) Rafael Jansen
DF	6	(Brazil) Marlon
MF	5	(Brazil) Pingo	(substituted off) 63'
MF	8	(Brazil) Lucas Siqueira (c)
MF	10	(Brazil) Felipe Gedoz
FW	7	(Brazil) Hélio Borges	(substituted off) 63'
FW	9	(Brazil) Augusto	(substituted off) 63'
FW	11	(Brazil) Wallace	(substituted off) 70'
Substitutes:
GK	12	(Brazil) Thiago Coelho
DF	13	(Brazil) Mimica
MF	14	(Brazil) Laílson	(substituted on) 63'
MF	16	(Brazil) Warley	(substituted on) 63'
MF	17	(Brazil) Dioguinho	(substituted on) 63'
MF	18	(Brazil) Tiago Miranda	(substituted on) 70'
FW	15	(Brazil) Ronald
FW	19	(Brazil) Pepê
Coach:
(Brazil) Paulo Bonamigo

Assistant referees:
Fabiano da Silva Ramires (Espírito Santo)
Vanderson Antônio Zanotti (Espírito Santo)
Fourth official:
Rodrigo Batista Raposo (Distrito Federal)
Fifth official:
Geufran Almeida de Oliveira (Distrito Federal)
Video assistant referee:
Gilberto Rodrigues Castro Júnior (Pernambuco)
Assistant video assistant referees:
Alisson Sidnei Furtado (Tocantins)
Clóvis Amaral da Silva (Pernambuco)

=== Second leg ===
24 February 2021
16:00 BRT (UTC−3)

Remo (Pará)	2–1	(Federal District (Brazil)) Brasiliense
Fredson 26'; Rafael Jansen 61'	Report	Zé Eduardo 49'
Penalties
Felipe Gedoz (penalty scored); Lucas Siqueira (penalty missed); Laílson (penalty scored); Wallace (penalty scored); Rafael Jansen (penalty scored); Wellington Silva (penalty missed)	4–5	(penalty scored) Peu; (penalty scored) Aldo; (penalty missed) Sandy; (penalty scored) Jefferson Maranhão; (penalty scored) Romarinho; (penalty scored) Diogo

Mangueirão, Belém
Attendance: 0
Referee: Jefferson Ferreira de Moraes (Goiás)

**Remo**	**Brasiliense**

GK	1	(Brazil) Vinícius
DF	2	(Brazil) Wellington Silva
DF	3	(Brazil) Fredson
DF	4	(Brazil) Rafael Jansen
DF	6	(Brazil) Marlon	(substituted off) 82'
MF	5	(Brazil) Pingo	(substituted off) 50'
MF	8	(Brazil) Lucas Siqueira (c)
MF	10	(Brazil) Felipe Gedoz
FW	7	(Brazil) Hélio Borges
FW	9	(Brazil) Augusto	(substituted off) 78'
FW	11	(Brazil) Wallace
Substitutes:
GK	12	(Brazil) Thiago Coelho
DF	13	(Brazil) Mimica
DF	20	(Brazil) Davi
MF	14	(Brazil) Laílson	(substituted on) 82'
MF	16	(Brazil) Warley
MF	17	(Brazil) Dioguinho	(substituted on) 50'
MF	18	(Brazil) Tiago Miranda	(substituted on) 78'
FW	15	(Brazil) Ronald
FW	19	(Brazil) Pepê
Coach:
(Brazil) Paulo Bonamigo

GK	1	(Brazil) Edmar Sucuri
DF	2	(Brazil) Diogo
DF	3	(Brazil) Badhuga		(yellow card) 24'
DF	4	(Brazil) Keynan
DF	6	(Brazil) Wagner Balotelli		(yellow card) 27' (yellow-red card) 59'
MF	5	(Brazil) Aldo
MF	8	(Brazil) Sandy
MF	10	(Brazil) Zotti (c)		(substituted off) 73'
MF	7	(Brazil) Luquinhas		(substituted off) 63'
MF	11	(Brazil) Maicon Assis		(substituted off) 73'
FW	9	(Brazil) Zé Eduardo	(yellow card) 36'	(substituted off) 63'
Substitutes:
GK	12	(Brazil) Fernandes
DF	13	(Brazil) Preto Costa
DF	14	(Brazil) Gustavo Henrique		(substituted on) 73'
DF	18	(Brazil) Peu		(substituted on) 63'
MF	15	(Brazil) Radamés
MF	17	(Brazil) Carlos Eduardo
FW	16	(Brazil) Peninha
FW	19	(Brazil) Rodrigo Fumaça
FW	20	(Brazil) Romarinho		(substituted on) 73'
FW	21	(Brazil) Michel Platini
FW	22	(Brazil) Jefferson Maranhão		(substituted on) 63'
Coach:
(Brazil) Vílson Taddei

Assistant referees:
Cristhian Passos Sorence (Goiás)
Leone Carvalho Rocha (Goiás)
Fourth official:
Andrey da Silva e Silva (Pará)
Fifth official:
Lúcio Ipojucan Ribeiro da Silva de Mattos (Pará)
Video assistant referee:
Elmo Alves Resende Cunha (Goiás)
Assistant video assistant referees:
Antônio Dib Moraes de Sousa (Piauí)
Edson Antônio de Sousa (Goiás)

== See also ==
- 2021 Copa do Brasil
