= 2019 Copa Verde finals =

- Event: 2019 Copa Verde
Cuiabá	Paysandu
(Mato Grosso)	(Pará)
1	1
- on aggregate Cuiabá won 5–4 on penalties

First leg
Cuiabá	Paysandu
0	1
- Date: 14 November 2019
- Venue: Arena Pantanal, Cuiabá
- Referee: André Luiz de Freitas Castro
- Attendance: 11,973

Second leg
Paysandu	Cuiabá
0	1
- Date: 20 November 2019
- Venue: Mangueirão, Belém
- Referee: Sávio Sampaio
- Attendance: 28,145

The 2019 Copa Verde finals was the final two-legged tie that decided the 2019 Copa Verde, the 6th season of the Copa Verde, Brazil's regional cup football tournament organised by the Brazilian Football Confederation.

The finals were contested in a two-legged home-and-away format between Cuiabá, from Mato Grosso, and Paysandu, from Pará.

Paysandu won the first leg 1–0, and Cuiabá won the second leg by the same score, which meant the title was decided by a penalty shoot-out, which Cuiabá won 5–4 to claim their second Copa Verde title.

== Teams ==
Team	Previous finals appearances (bold indicates winners)
(Mato Grosso) Cuiabá	1 (**2015**)
(Pará) Paysandu	4 (2014, **2016**, 2017, **2018**)

=== Road to the final ===
Note: In all scores below, the score of the finalist is given first.

(Mato Grosso) Cuiabá			Round	(Pará) Paysandu		
Opponent	Venue	Score		Opponent	Venue	Score
Bye			First round	Bye		
(Goiás) Iporá (tied 2–2 on aggregate, won 6–5 on penalties)	Away	2–1	Round of 16	(Amazonas (Brazilian state)) Nacional (won 1–0 on aggregate)	Away	1–0
(Goiás) Iporá (tied 2–2 on aggregate, won 6–5 on penalties)	Home	0–1	Round of 16	(Amazonas (Brazilian state)) Nacional (won 1–0 on aggregate)	Home	0–0
(Mato Grosso do Sul) Costa Rica (won 3–2 on aggregate)	Away	1–1	Quarter-finals	(Pará) Bragantino (tied 2–2 on aggregate, won 6–5 on penalties)	Home	1–1
(Mato Grosso do Sul) Costa Rica (won 3–2 on aggregate)	Home	2–1	Quarter-finals	(Pará) Bragantino (tied 2–2 on aggregate, won 6–5 on penalties)	Away	1–1
Goiás (tied 2–2 on aggregate, won 4–3 on penalties)	Away	0–1	Semi-finals	(Pará) Remo (won 3–1 on aggregate)	Neutral	0–0
Goiás (tied 2–2 on aggregate, won 4–3 on penalties)	Home	2–1	Semi-finals	(Pará) Remo (won 3–1 on aggregate)	Neutral	3–1

== Format ==
The finals were played on a home-and-away two-legged basis. If tied on aggregate, the penalty shoot-out was used to determine the winner.

== Matches ==
=== First leg ===
14 November 2019
20:00 AMT (UTC−4)

Cuiabá (Mato Grosso)	0–1	(Pará) Paysandu
	Report	Nicolas 68'

Arena Pantanal, Cuiabá
Attendance: 11,973
Referee: André Luiz de Freitas Castro (Goiás)

**Cuiabá**	**Paysandu**

GK	1	(Brazil) Victor Souza
DF	2	(Brazil) Léo	(yellow card) 90+1' (yellow-red card) 90+5'
DF	3	(Brazil) Ednei
DF	4	(Brazil) Anderson Conceição (c)
DF	6	(Brazil) Paulinho	(substituted off) 82'
MF	5	(Brazil) Escobar	(yellow card) 41'
MF	8	(Brazil) Marino	(substituted off) 36'
MF	10	(Brazil) Alê
MF	7	(Brazil) Toty	(substituted off) 65'
FW	11	(Brazil) Felipe Marques
FW	9	(Brazil) Jefinho
Substitutes:
GK	12	(Brazil) Matheus Nogueira
DF	13	(Brazil) Alex Ruan	(substituted in) 82'
DF	14	(Brazil) Leandro Souza
DF	20	(Brazil) Jonas
DF	23	(Brazil) Tsunami
MF	15	(Brazil) Djavan
MF	16	(Brazil) Moisés
MF	17	(Brazil) João Henrique
MF	18	(Argentina) Damián Escudero	(substituted in) 36'
FW	19	(Uruguay) Agustín Gutiérrez	(substituted in) 65'
FW	21	(Brazil) Josiel
FW	22	(Brazil) Rincon
Coach:
(Brazil) Marcelo Chamusca

GK	1	(Brazil) Giovanni
DF	2	(Brazil) Tony		(substituted off) 82'
DF	34	(Brazil) Micael (c)
DF	4	(Brazil) Victor Oliveira
DF	5	(Brazil) Bruno Collaço
MF	25	(Brazil) Wellington Reis		(yellow card) 13'
MF	29	(Brazil) Caíque Oliveira		(substituted off) 75'
MF	8	(Brazil) Tomas Bastos	(yellow card) 30'	(substituted off) 56'
FW	30	(Brazil) Elielton		(yellow card) 57'
FW	28	(Brazil) Vinícius Leite		(yellow card) 70'
FW	11	(Brazil) Nicolas
Substitutes:
GK	23	(Brazil) Paulo Ricardo
DF	13	(Brazil) Bruno Oliveira		(substituted in) 82'
DF	36	(Brazil) Diego Matos
MF	10	(Brazil) Leandro Lima		(substituted in) 56'
MF	22	(Brazil) Yure
MF	39	(Brazil) Thiago Primão		(substituted in) 75'
MF	40	(Brazil) Tiago Luís
FW	20	(Brazil) Bruce
FW	37	(Brazil) Aslen
Coach:
(Brazil) Hélio dos Anjos

Assistant referees:
Cristhian Passos Sorence (Goiás)
Leone Carvalho Rocha (Goiás)
Fourth official:
Eduardo Tomaz de Aquino Valadão (Goiás)
Fifth official:
Hugo Sávio Xavier Corrêa (Goiás)
Video assistant referee:
Elmo Alves Resende Cunha (Goiás)
Assistant video assistant referees:
Jefferson Ferreira de Moraes (Goiás)
Edson Antônio de Sousa (Goiás)

=== Second leg ===
20 November 2019
21:00 BRT (UTC−3)

Paysandu (Pará)	0–1	(Mato Grosso) Cuiabá
	Report	Paulinho 90+4'
Penalties
Leandro Lima (penalty scored); Thiago Primão (penalty scored); Tony (penalty scored); Micael (penalty scored); Caíque Oliveira (penalty missed); Nicolas (penalty missed)	4–5	(penalty missed) Ednei; (penalty scored) Gutiérrez; (penalty scored) Escudero; (penalty scored) Alex Ruan; (penalty scored) Paulinho; (penalty scored) Felipe Marques

Mangueirão, Belém
Attendance: 28,145
Referee: Sávio Sampaio (Distrito Federal)

**Paysandu**	**Cuiabá**

GK	1	(Brazil) Giovanni		(yellow card) 76'
DF	2	(Brazil) Tony
DF	34	(Brazil) Micael (c)
DF	26	(Brazil) Perema
DF	5	(Brazil) Bruno Collaço
MF	25	(Brazil) Wellington Reis		(substituted off) 86'
MF	29	(Brazil) Caíque Oliveira		(yellow card) 36'
MF	8	(Brazil) Tomas Bastos	(yellow card) 48'	(substituted off) 63'
FW	30	(Brazil) Elielton		(substituted off) 72'
FW	28	(Brazil) Vinícius Leite
FW	11	(Brazil) Nicolas
Substitutes:
GK	12	(Brazil) Afonso
GK	23	(Brazil) Paulo Ricardo
DF	4	(Brazil) Victor Oliveira
DF	13	(Brazil) Bruno Oliveira
DF	36	(Brazil) Diego Matos
MF	10	(Brazil) Leandro Lima		(substituted in) 63'
MF	22	(Brazil) Yure
MF	39	(Brazil) Thiago Primão		(substituted in) 86'
MF	40	(Brazil) Tiago Luís
FW	18	(Brazil) Hygor		(substituted in) 72'
FW	20	(Brazil) Bruce
FW	37	(Brazil) Aslen
Coach:
(Brazil) Hélio dos Anjos

GK	1	(Brazil) Victor Souza
DF	2	(Brazil) Jonas		(yellow card) 64'
DF	3	(Brazil) Ednei
DF	4	(Brazil) Anderson Conceição (c)		(yellow card) 67'
DF	6	(Brazil) Paulinho		(yellow card) 60'
MF	5	(Brazil) Moisés	(yellow card) 15'	(substituted off) 72'
MF	8	(Brazil) Djavan		(yellow card) 82'
MF	10	(Brazil) Alê		(substituted off) 46'
MF	7	(Brazil) Toty		(substituted off) 64'
FW	11	(Brazil) Felipe Marques
FW	9	(Brazil) Jefinho
Substitutes:
GK	12	(Brazil) Matheus Nogueira
DF	13	(Brazil) Alex Ruan		(substituted in) 72'
DF	14	(Brazil) Tsunami		(yellow card) 90+5'
MF	15	(Brazil) Escobar
MF	16	(Argentina) Damián Escudero		(substituted in) 46'
MF	18	(Brazil) Marino
FW	17	(Uruguay) Agustín Gutiérrez		(substituted in) 64'
FW	19	(Brazil) Josiel
Coach:
(Brazil) Marcelo Chamusca

Assistant referees:
Daniel Henrique da Silva Andrade (Distrito Federal)
José Reinaldo Nascimento Júnior (Distrito Federal)
Fourth official:
Christiano Gayo Nascimento (Distrito Federal)
Fifth official:
Luciano Benevides de Sousa (Distrito Federal)
Video assistant referee:
Wilton Pereira Sampaio (Goiás)
Assistant video assistant referees:
Dyorgines José Padovani de Andrade (Espírito Santo)
Fabiano da Silva Ramires (Espírito Santo)

== See also ==
- 2020 Copa do Brasil
