= Romarinho =

Romarinho may refer to the following footballers:

- Romarinho (footballer, born 1985), Brazilian midfielder, playing for Kalmar FF
- Romarinho (footballer, born June 1990). Brazilian forward, playing for Manauara EC
- Romarinho (footballer, born December 1990), Brazilian midfielder/forward, playing for Al Rayyan SC
- Romarinho (footballer, born 1993), Brazilian forward, playing for América-RJ, son of former Brazilian footballer Romário
- Romarinho (footballer, born 1994), Brazilian forward, playing for Sport Recife
