= Josiel =

Josiel is a given name. It may refer to:

- Josiel (footballer, born 1980), Josiel da Rocha, Brazilian football striker
- Josiel Núñez (born 1993), Panamanian football midfielder
- Josiel (footballer, born 1999), Josiel Ortega Arruda, Brazilian football forward

== See also ==
- Jô (footballer, born 1988), Josiel Alves de Oliveira, Brazilian football winger
