= Victor Luiz =

Victor Luiz may refer to:

- Victor Luiz (footballer, born April 1997), full name Victor Luiz Pereira Silva, Brazilian football wing-back
- Victor Luiz (footballer, born December 1997), full name Victor Luiz Prestes Filho, Brazilian football left-back
