= Gustavo Ramos (footballer) =

Brazilian footballer (born 1996)

Personal information
- Full name: Gustavo Ramos Vasconcelos de Oliveira
- Date of birth: 2 July 1996 (age 30)
- Place of birth: Crixás, Brazil
- Height: 1.75 m (5 ft 9 in)
- Position: Forward

Team information
- Current team: América RN

Youth career
- 2012–2015: Vila Nova
- 2015: → Internacional (loan)
- 2016: Internacional

Senior career*
Years	Team	Apps	(Gls)
2013–2015	Vila Nova	45	(2)
2016–2017	Internacional	0	(0)
2017	→ Ypiranga-RS (loan)	3	(0)
2018	Aparecidense	10	(0)
2018	Red Bull Brasil	0	(0)
2019	Remo	29	(4)
2020–2021	Sampaio Corrêa	39	(2)
2021	→ Caxias (loan)	12	(4)
2021	Confiança	13	(0)
2021–2022	São Bernardo	4	(0)
2022	Figueirense	17	(1)
2023	Portuguesa	12	(0)
2023	Maringá	3	(0)
2023–2024	América RN	30	(2)
2025	Botafogo-PB	12	(0)
2025	Floresta	7	(0)
2026–	ASA	21	(2)
- * Club domestic league appearances and goals as of 19 November 2026

Gustavo Ramos Vasconcelos de Oliveira (born 2 July 1996), known as Gustavo Ramos or Gustavinho, is a Brazilian footballer who plays as a forward for América RN.

== Club career ==
Born in Crixás, Goiás, Gustavo Ramos was a Vila Nova youth graduate. He made his first team debut on 31 March 2013, aged 16, coming on as a second-half substitute for Thiago Marin in a 2–2 Campeonato Goiano home draw against Anápolis.

Gustavo Ramos scored his first goal on 21 April 2013, netting his side's second in a 3–0 home win over Rio Verde. On 24 January 2015, after being regularly used in the main squad, he was loaned to Internacional and returned to the youth setup.

On 4 February 2016, Gustavo Ramos joined Inter permanently. He was loaned to Ypiranga-RS for the 2017 Campeonato Gaúcho, before signing for Aparecidense in November 2017.

On 12 December 2018, after a short period at Red Bull Brasil, Gustavo Ramos was presented at Remo. On 28 October 2019, he moved to Sampaio Corrêa after failing to agree a contract renewal.

On 2 February 2021, Gustavo Ramos joined Caxias. He agreed to a deal with Confiança on 18 June, but moved to São Bernardo on 21 September, for the year's Copa Paulista.

On 5 April 2022, Gustavo Ramos signed a contract with Figueirense. On 1 December, he was announced as the new signing of Portuguesa.

== Career statistics ==
As of 17 March 2023

Club	Season	League			State League		Cup		Continental		Other		Total	
Club	Season	Division	Apps	Goals	Apps	Goals	Apps	Goals	Apps	Goals	Apps	Goals	Apps	Goals
Vila Nova	2013	Série C	17	0	4	1	—		—		—		21	1
Vila Nova	2014	Série B	14	0	10	1	—		—		—		24	1
Vila Nova	Total		31	0	14	2	—		—		—		45	2
Internacional	2016	Série A	0	0	—		—		—		9 (Note: Appearance(s) in Super Copa Gaúcha)	1	9	1
Internacional	2017	Série B	0	0	—		—		—		1 (Note: Appearance(s) in Copa FGF)	0	1	0
Internacional	Total		0	0	—		—		—		10	1	10	1
Ypiranga-RS (loan)	2017	Série C	0	0	3	0	0	0	—		—		3	0
Aparecidense	2018	Série D	0	0	10	0	2	1	—		—		12	1
Red Bull Brasil	2018	Paulista	—		0	0	—		—		16 (Note: Appearance(s) in Copa Paulista)	0	16	0
Remo	2019	Série C	17	2	12	2	1	0	—		5 (Note: Appearance(s) in Copa Verde)	1	35	5
Sampaio Corrêa	2020	Série B	30	1	9	1	1	1	—		—		40	3
Caxias	2021	Série D	0	0	12	4	1	0	—		—		13	4
Confiança	2021	Série C	13	0	—		—		—		—		13	0
São Bernardo	2021	Paulista A2	—		0	0	—		—		11	2	11	2
São Bernardo	2022	Série D	0	0	4	0	—		—		—		4	0
São Bernardo	Total		0	0	4	0	—		—		11	2	15	2
Figueirense	2022	Série C	17	1	—		—		—		—		17	1
Portuguesa	2023	Paulista	—		12	0	—		—		—		12	0
Maringá	2023	Série D	0	0	—		0	0	—		—		0	0
Career total			108	4	76	9	5	2	0	0	42	4	231	19

== Honours ==
Internacional

- Super Copa Gaúcha: 2016

Remo

- Campeonato Paraense: 2019

Sampaio Corrêa

- Campeonato Maranhense: 2020

São Bernardo

- Copa Paulista: 2021
