= Edmar Sucuri =

Brazilian footballer

Personal information
- Full name: Edmar da Silva Oliveira
- Date of birth: 13 October 1989 (age 37)
- Place of birth: Brasília, Brazil
- Height: 1.86 m (6 ft 1 in)
- Position: Goalkeeper

Senior career*
Years	Team	Apps	(Gls)
2012	Ceilândia		
2013	Luziânia		
2013	Caldas Novas		
2013	→ Atlético Goianiense (loan)		
2014–2015	Luziânia		
2015	Palmas		
2016	Luziânia		
2016	Fast Clube		
2017–2023	Brasiliense		
2018	→ Taguatinga (loan)		
2023	→ ASA (loan)		
2024	CSE		
2024	Boa Esporte		
2024	Legião		
2025	Ceilândia		
2025	Luziânia		
- * Club domestic league appearances and goals as of 23 October 2025

Edmar da Silva Oliveira (born 13 October 1989), better known as Edmar Sucuri, is a Brazilian professional footballer who plays as a goalkeeper.

== Career ==
Edmar Sucuri began his career in football in 2012 at Ceilândia. He then played for Luziânia where he was Brasilia champion in 2014 and 2016. He was also part of the Campeonato Amazonense champion squad with Fast. He played for Brasiliense from 2017 to 2023, winning three state championships and the 2020 Copa Verde, being one of the team's main highlights. In 2023 he transferred to ASA in the 2023 Série D dispute, and for the 2024 season he signed with CSE-AL. Subsequently, Sucuri played for Boa Esporte and Legião. In 2025, he played for Ceilândia and Luziânia.

== Honours ==
Ceilândia

- Campeonato Brasiliense: 2012

Luziânia

- Campeonato Brasiliense: 2014, 2016

Fast Clube

- Campeonato Amazonense: 2016

Brasiliense

- Copa Verde: 2020
- Campeonato Brasiliense: 2017, 2021, 2022
