= Daniel Vançan =

Brazilian footballer (born 1996)

Personal information
- Date of birth: 25 October 1996 (age 30)
- Place of birth: São Jorge do Ivaí, Brazil
- Height: 1.80 m (5 ft 11 in)
- Position: Left-back

Team information
- Current team: Ferroviário

Youth career
- 2013–2015: Cruzeiro
- 2016: Desportivo Brasil

Senior career*
Years	Team	Apps	(Gls)
2016–2017	Gil Vicente	6	(0)
2018	Ferroviária	0	(0)
2018	→ Botafogo SP (loan)	6	(2)
2019–2020	Mirassol	0	(0)
2019	→ São Bernardo (loan)	0	(0)
2019	→ Remo (loan)	13	(1)
2020	→ Inter de Limeira (loan)	4	(0)
2020–2022	Inter de Limeira	16	(1)
2022	→ Oeste (loan)	14	(2)
2022	Oeste	5	(0)
2022–2023	ABC	19	(0)
2023	Oeste		
2023–	Ferroviário		
- * Club domestic league appearances and goals as of 27 August 2023

Daniel Vançan (born 25 October 1996) is a Brazilian footballer who plays as a left-back for Ferroviário.

== Career ==
Vançan made his professional debut in the Segunda Liga for Gil Vicente on 24 August 2016 in a game against Académico de Viseu.
