= Guilherme Garré =

Brazilian footballer (born 1993)

Personal information
- Full name: Guilherme de Oliveira Garré
- Date of birth: 20 March 1993 (age 33)
- Place of birth: São Paulo, Brazil
- Height: 1.65 m (5 ft 5 in)
- Position: Attacking midfielder

Youth career
- Mogi Mirim
- Santo André

Senior career*
| Years | Team | Apps | (Gls) |
| 2013–2020 | Santo André | 85 | (3) |
| 2016 | → São Bento (loan) | 10 | (1) |
| 2017 | → Boa Esporte (loan) | 0 | (0) |
| 2018 | → Botafogo-SP (loan) | 8 | (1) |
| 2019 | → Remo (loan) | 10 | (1) |
| 2020 | Imperatriz | 7 | (0) |
| 2020–2021 | XV de Piracicaba | 29 | (1) |
| 2021– | Figueirense | 18 | (1) |
| 2023– | Novo Hamburgo | | |
- * Club domestic league appearances and goals as of 21 November 2021

Guilherme de Oliveira Garré (born 20 March 1993) is a Brazilian professional footballer who plays as an attacking midfielder.
