= Thiago Marin =

Brazilian footballer

Personal information
- Full name: Thiago Marin Mártir
- Date of birth: November 3, 1984 (age 41)
- Place of birth: Itaquera, Brazil
- Height: 1.70 m (5 ft 7 in)
- Position: Attacking midfielder

Youth career
- 2001–2002: Atlético-PR

Senior career*
Years	Team	Apps	(Gls)
2003–2004	Atlético-PR	15	(1)
2005	Portuguesa-PR		
2006	Operário-MS		
2006–2009	Botafogo	9	(0)
2007	→ Itumbiara (loan)		
2008	→ CFZ (loan)		
2009	→ Anápolis (loan)		
2009	Londrina		
2010	Uberaba		
2010	Náutico	4	(0)
2011	Noroeste		
2011–2012	Anagennisi Epanomi	7	(3)
2012	Uberaba		
2012	Araxá		
2012–2013	Al-Muharraq		
2013	Araxá		
2013–2014	Vila Nova		
2014	Guarani		
2014–2016	Nacional		
2016–2017	Caldense		
- * Club domestic league appearances and goals

Thiago Marin Martir or simply Thiago Marin (born November 3, 1984, in Itaquera), is a Brazilian attacking midfielder. He last played for Caldense.

== Honours ==
- Rio de Janeiro's Cup: 2007, 2008
