= Eudes Pedro =

Brazilian football manager

Personal information
- Full name: Eudes Pedro dos Santos
- Date of birth: 19 July 1966 (age 60)
- Place of birth: Recife, Brazil

Team information
- Current team: Santos (assistant)

Managerial career
- Years: Team
- 2002–2003: São Caetano (assistant)
- 2003: Atlético Paranaense (assistant)
- 2004: Coritiba (assistant)
- 2005: Coritiba (assistant)
- 2005: São Caetano (assistant)
- 2006–2007: Botafogo (assistant)
- 2007–2008: Botafogo (assistant)
- 2008: Santos (assistant)
- 2008: Fluminense (assistant)
- 2009: Flamengo (assistant)
- 2009–2010: Fluminense (assistant)
- 2010–2011: Cruzeiro (assistant)
- 2011–2013: Atlético Mineiro (assistant)
- 2014–2015: Shandong Luneng (assistant)
- 2016: Palmeiras (assistant)
- 2017: Palmeiras (assistant)
- 2018: Santos (assistant)
- 2019: Remo
- 2020: Perilima
- 2020–2021: Santos (assistant)
- 2021: Atlético Mineiro (assistant)
- 2022: Atlético Mineiro (assistant)
- 2023: Resende
- 2023: Tombense (assistant)
- 2024: CRB (assistant)
- 2025: Remo (assistant)
- 2025: Sport Recife (assistant)
- 2026: Vitória das Tabocas
- 2026–: Santos (assistant)

Eudes Pedro dos Santos (born 19 July 1966), known as Eudes Pedro or just Eudes, is a Brazilian football coach, currently the assistant coach of Santos.

== Career ==
Born in Recife, Pernambuco, Eudes started his career with Santa Cruz in 1996, as a fitness coach. In 1998 he joined Atlético Paranaense under the same role, but left in 2002 to work as Mário Sérgio's assistant at São Caetano.

Eudes returned to Furacão in 2003, also as Mário Sérgio's assistant, but was relieved of his duties in September of that year. On 24 December, he joined Coritiba to work as an assistant of Antônio Lopes.

Eudes started working with Cuca in 2005, also as an assistant. In 2019, after being released by Santos, he opted not to join Cuca's staff at São Paulo in order to achieve a coaching license.

On 27 August 2019, Eudes was named head coach of Remo. On 15 October, after losing to rivals Paysandu and only one win out of four matches, he was sacked.

In February 2020, Eudes took over Perilima. He left the club at the end of the 2020 Campeonato Paraibano, after just six matches.

Eudes returned to Santos on 20 August 2020, again as Cuca's assistant. On 10 November, it was announced that he had tested positive for COVID-19.

Eudes continued to work with Cuca at Atlético Mineiro, before being appointed head coach of Resende on 17 March 2023. Sacked on 13 July, he subsequently returned to his assistant role, working at Tombense, CRB, Remo and Sport Recife, the latter three under Daniel Paulista.

On 10 December 2025, Eudes was announced as Vitória das Tabocas' head coach for the upcoming season. The following 25 March, he rejoined Cuca's staff back at Santos, again as an assistant.

== Managerial statistics ==
As of 25 March 2026

Managerial record by team and tenure
Team	Nat	From	To	Record								Ref
Team	Nat	From	To	G	W	D	L	GF	GA	GD	Win %	Ref
Remo	(Brazil)	27 August 2019	15 October 2019	4	1	1	2	8	6	+2	25.00	
Perilima	(Brazil)	6 February 2020	28 July 2020	6	2	0	4	6	10	−4	33.33	
Resende	(Brazil)	17 March 2023	13 July 2023	19	6	6	7	22	22	+0	31.58	
Vitória das Tabocas	(Brazil)	10 December 2025	25 March 2026	7	1	1	5	7	14	−7	14.29	
Total				36	10	8	18	43	52	−9	27.78	—
