= Hélder (footballer, born 1990) =

Brazilian footballer (born 1990)

Personal information
- Full name: Hélder Gomes Maciel
- Date of birth: 24 May 1990 (age 36)
- Place of birth: Belo Horizonte, Brazil
- Height: 1.88 m (6 ft 2 in)
- Position: Centre-back

Team information
- Current team: São Bernardo
- Number: 3

Youth career
- Cruzeiro

Senior career*
| Years | Team | Apps | (Gls) |
| 2011–2013 | Cruzeiro | 0 | (0) |
| 2011–2012 | → Boa Esporte (loan) | 1 | (0) |
| 2013 | → Aparecidense (loan) | 12 | (0) |
| 2014 | Tupi | 13 | (2) |
| 2015 | Caldense | 2 | (0) |
| 2016–2017 | Tupi | 11 | (0) |
| 2018 | Iporá | 16 | (0) |
| 2018–2019 | Luverdense | 25 | (0) |
| 2019–2020 | Cuiabá | 17 | (0) |
| 2020 | Criciúma | 3 | (0) |
| 2021–2022 | Água Santa | 29 | (3) |
| 2021 | → São Bernardo (loan) | 0 | (0) |
| 2022– | São Bernardo | 117 | (5) |
- * Club domestic league appearances and goals as of 18 November 2026

Hélder Gomes Maciel (born 24 May 1990), known as Hélder Maciel or just Hélder, is a Brazilian footballer who plays as a centre-back for São Bernardo.

== Career ==
Born in Belo Horizonte, Minas Gerais, Hélder was a Cruzeiro youth graduate, but made his senior debut while on loan at Boa Esporte in 2011. Ahead of the 2013 season, he moved to Aparecidense.

In December 2014, after a one-year spell at Tupi, Hélder joined Caldense. He returned to his previous club on 8 December 2015, but was rarely used.

In 2018, Hélder signed for Iporá, but moved to Luverdense on 23 May of that year. On 30 August 2019, he was announced at Cuiabá, but featured sparingly before rescinding his link on 1 October 2020.

On 15 October 2020, Hélder signed for Criciúma. He was announced at Água Santa for the 2021 season, before being loaned out to São Bernardo on 11 August of that year.

After winning the 2021 Copa Paulista, Hélder returned to Netuno for the 2022 Campeonato Paulista, before signing a permanent deal with Bernô on 22 April 2022.

== Career statistics ==
As of 3 February 2025

| Club | Season | League | | | State League | | Cup | | Continental | | Other | | Total | |
| Club | Season | Division | Apps | Goals | Apps | Goals | Apps | Goals | Apps | Goals | Apps | Goals | Apps | Goals |
|---|---|---|---|---|---|---|---|---|---|---|---|---|---|---|
| Boa Esporte | 2011 | Série B | 1 | 0 | — | | — | | — | | — | | 1 | 0 |
| Boa Esporte | 2012 | Série B | 0 | 0 | 0 | 0 | — | | — | | — | | 0 | 0 |
| Boa Esporte | Total | | 1 | 0 | 0 | 0 | — | | — | | — | | 1 | 0 |
| Aparecidense | 2013 | Série D | 8 | 0 | 4 | 0 | — | | — | | — | | 12 | 0 |
| Tupi | 2014 | Série C | 3 | 1 | 10 | 1 | 2 | 0 | — | | — | | 15 | 2 |
| Caldense | 2015 | Série D | 1 | 0 | 1 | 0 | — | | — | | — | | 2 | 0 |
| Tupi | 2016 | Série B | 4 | 0 | 3 | 0 | — | | — | | — | | 7 | 0 |
| Tupi | 2017 | Série C | 4 | 0 | 0 | 0 | — | | — | | — | | 4 | 0 |
| Tupi | Total | | 8 | 0 | 3 | 0 | — | | — | | — | | 11 | 0 |
| Iporá | 2018 | Série D | 4 | 0 | 12 | 0 | — | | — | | — | | 16 | 0 |
| Luverdense | 2018 | Série C | 10 | 0 | — | | — | | — | | — | | 10 | 0 |
| Luverdense | 2019 | Série C | 12 | 0 | 3 | 0 | 4 | 0 | — | | 1 (Note: Appearance(s) in Copa Verde) | 1 | 20 | 1 |
| Luverdense | Total | | 22 | 0 | 3 | 0 | 4 | 0 | — | | 1 | 1 | 30 | 1 |
| Cuiabá | 2019 | Série B | 6 | 0 | — | | — | | — | | — | | 6 | 0 |
| Cuiabá | 2020 | Série B | 3 | 0 | 8 | 0 | 0 | 0 | — | | — | | 11 | 0 |
| Cuiabá | Total | | 9 | 0 | 8 | 0 | 0 | 0 | — | | — | | 17 | 0 |
| Criciúma | 2020 | Série C | 3 | 0 | — | | — | | — | | — | | 3 | 0 |
| Água Santa | 2021 | Paulista A2 | — | | 17 | 2 | — | | — | | — | | 17 | 2 |
| Água Santa | 2022 | Paulista | — | | 12 | 1 | — | | — | | — | | 12 | 1 |
| Água Santa | Total | | — | | 29 | 3 | — | | — | | — | | 29 | 3 |
| São Bernardo (loan) | 2021 | Paulista A2 | — | | — | | — | | — | | 5 (Note: Appearance(s) in Copa Paulista) | 0 | 5 | 0 |
| São Bernardo | 2022 | Série D | 16 | 0 | — | | — | | — | | — | | 16 | 0 |
| São Bernardo | 2023 | Série C | 14 | 1 | 13 | 0 | 1 | 0 | — | | — | | 28 | 1 |
| São Bernardo | 2024 | Série C | 21 | 1 | 11 | 2 | 2 | 0 | — | | — | | 34 | 3 |
| São Bernardo | 2025 | Série C | 0 | 0 | 5 | 0 | — | | — | | — | | 5 | 0 |
| São Bernardo | Total | | 51 | 2 | 29 | 2 | 3 | 0 | — | | — | | 83 | 4 |
| Career total | | | 110 | 3 | 99 | 6 | 9 | 0 | 0 | 0 | 6 | 1 | 224 | 10 |

== Honours ==
São Bernardo

- Copa Paulista: 2021
