= Ednei (footballer, born 1990) =

Brazilian footballer

Personal information
- Full name: Ednei Barbosa de Souza
- Date of birth: 5 July 1990 (age 36)
- Place of birth: Senhor do Bonfim
- Height: 1.85 m (6 ft 1 in)
- Position: Defender

Team information
- Current team: Tombense

Senior career*
Years	Team	Apps	(Gls)
2008–2010	Votoraty	0	(0)
2008	→ Lemense (loan)	0	(0)
2010	→ Uberaba (loan)	0	(0)
2010	→ Comercial (loan)	0	(0)
2011	Grêmio Barueri	0	(0)
2011	CRB	10	(0)
2012	Catanduvense	0	(0)
2012–2013	CRB	27	(3)
2013	Atlético Goianiense	18	(2)
2014	Audax	0	(0)
2014–2016	Vitória	12	(0)
2015	→ Coritiba (loan)	0	(0)
2016	→ Linense (loan)	0	(0)
2016	Bragantino	13	(0)
2017	Rio Preto	0	(0)
2017	Tombense	16	(0)
2018	Cuiabá	23	(0)
2019	Botafogo SP	14	(1)
2019–2020	Cuiabá	60	(1)
2021–2022	Ponte Preta	21	(0)
2022	Mirassol	4	(0)
2022–2023	Tombense	23	(1)
2023	Santo André	5	(0)
2023	CSA	15	(0)
2023–	Tombense	6	(0)
- * Club domestic league appearances and goals as of 30 October 2023

Ednei Barbosa de Souza (born 5 July 1990), known as Ednei, is a Brazilian footballer who plays for Tombense as a defender.

== Career statistics ==
As of 3 February 2017

Club	Season	League			State League		Cup		Continental		Other		Total	
Club	Season	Division	Apps	Goals	Apps	Goals	Apps	Goals	Apps	Goals	Apps	Goals	Apps	Goals
Votoraty	2010	Paulista A2	—		2	0	—		—		—		2	0
Uberaba	2010	Série D	—		7	2	1	0	—		—		8	2
Grêmio Barueri	2011	Série B	—		12	0	5	0	—		—		17	0
CRB	2011	Série C	10	0	—		—		—		—		10	0
Catanduvense	2012	Paulista	—		19	2	—		—		—		19	2
CRB	2012	Série B	27	3	—		—		—		—		27	3
CRB	2013	Série C	—		—		—		—		6 (Note: All appearance(s) in Copa do Nordeste)	0	6	0
CRB	Subtotal		27	3	—		—		—		6	0	33	3
Atlético Goianiense	2013	Série C	18	2	8	1	1	0	—		—		27	3
Audax	2014	Paulista	—		7	0	—		—		—		7	0
Vitória	2014	Série A	4	0	—		—		3 (Note: All appearance(s) in Copa Sudamericana)	1	—		7	1
Vitória	2015	Série B	8	0	8	0	4	0	—		9	0	29	0
Vitória	Subtotal		12	0	8	0	4	0	3	1	9	0	36	1
Coritiba	2015	Série A	0	0	—		—		—		—		0	0
Linense	2016	Série D	—		8	0	2	0	—		—		10	0
Bragantino	2016	Série B	13	0	—		—		—		—		13	0
Career total			80	5	71	5	13	0	3	1	15	0	182	11
