= Thiago Coelho =

Brazilian footballer

Personal information
- Full name: Thiago Rodrigues Coelho
- Date of birth: 26 May 1995 (age 31)
- Place of birth: Cascavel, Brazil
- Height: 1.86 m (6 ft 1 in)
- Position: Goalkeeper

Team information
- Current team: Santa Cruz
- Number: 1

Youth career
- Coritiba

Senior career*
Years	Team	Apps	(Gls)
2016	Flamengo-PI	0	(0)
2016	Atlético Itapemirim	0	(0)
2017	Guarany de Sobral	5	(0)
2017	XV de Jaú	3	(0)
2018	Velo Clube	3	(0)
2018	VOCEM	1	(0)
2019–2021	Remo	15	(0)
2022–2023	Paysandu	53	(0)
2024	São Bento	16	(0)
2024–2025	Caxias	34	(0)
2026	Ponte Preta	0	(0)
2026–	Santa Cruz	16	(0)
- * Club domestic league appearances and goals as of 9 November 2026

Thiago Rodrigues Coelho (born 26 May 1995 in Cascavel), known as Thiago Coelho or just Thiago, is a Brazilian goalkeeper who plays for Santa Cruz.

== Honours ==
Remo

- Campeonato Paraense: 2019
- Copa Verde: 2021

Paysandu

- Copa Verde: 2022
