= Zotti (footballer) =

Brazilian footballer

Personal information
- Full name: Jenner Zottele
- Date of birth: 23 May 1985 (age 41)
- Place of birth: São Paulo, Brazil
- Height: 1.80 m (5 ft 11 in)
- Position: Midfielder

Youth career
- 2003–2004: Portuguesa
- 2004–2005: Atlético Mineiro

Senior career*
Years	Team	Apps	(Gls)
2005–2008	Atlético Mineiro	2	(0)
2005	→ Anapolina (loan)		
2006	→ Democrata-GV (loan)		
2006	→ América Mineiro (loan)		
2007	→ Democrata-GV (loan)		
2007	→ União Rondonópolis (loan)		
2008	CRAC		
2008	Araxá		
2009	Cabofriense		
2009	Unaí		
2010	Botafogo-DF		
2010–2011	Cabofriense		
2010	→ America-RJ (loan)		
2011	Macaé	2	(0)
2012	Tombense	8	(1)
2013	Betim	12	(0)
2014	CRAC	18	(4)
2014	Brasil de Pelotas	10	(1)
2015	Treze	12	(4)
2015	CRAC		
2015–2016	Vila Nova	26	(3)
2016	Botafogo-SP	18	(4)
2017	Macaé	11	(0)
2017	ABC	15	(0)
2018	Novo Hamburgo	12	(1)
2018	Joinville	7	(1)
2019	São José-RS	4	(0)
2019	Villa Nova	5	(0)
2019	Remo	12	(1)
2020	Ypiranga-RS	24	(0)
2020–2023	Brasiliense	106	(8)
2024	Goianésia	11	(0)
2024	Anápolis	11	(0)
2025	Goiânia	10	(1)
- * Club domestic league appearances and goals as of 14 September 2025

Jenner Zottele (born 23 May 1985), better known as Zotti, is a Brazilian professional footballer who plays as a midfielder.

== Career ==
Starting his career in the Portuguesa youth sectors, Zotti arrived at Atlético Mineiro in 2005. He spent most of his time at the club on loan, but played in two matches during the 2006 Série B title campaign. He played for more modest teams in Brazilian football in the first part of his career, being champion only with Cabofriense, in the second tier of football in Rio de Janeiro.

In the 2015 season, after standing out for Treze in the Campeonato Paraibano, and with a quick spell at CRAC, he arrived at Vila Nova, where he was decisive in winning the 2015 Campeonato Brasileiro Série C, scoring one of the goals in the finals. Zotti remained at Vila Nova in the first part of the 2016 season, arriving at Botafogo de Ribeirão Preto in August, and staying until the end of the Série C.

Zotti started the 2017 season with Macaé, and ended up playing for ABC. In 2018 he defended EC Novo Hamburgo and Joinville. In the 2019 season he played for three clubs: EC São José, Villa Nova AC and Remo.

In 2020, amid the COVID-19 pandemic and after playing at Ypiranga de Erechim, Zotti arrived at the club for which he played more seasons and won more titles. With Brasiliense FC he was champion of the 2020 Copa Verde, two-time state champion and played for three full seasons, totaling 106 appearances and 8 goals for the club.

Zotti left Brasiliense at the end of August 2023, and in 2024 he played in the Campeonato Goiano for Goianésia. Afterwards, he was hired by Anápolis to compete in the 2024 Campeonato Brasileiro Série D, where he finished runner-up.

In November 2024, Zotti was announced as a reinforcement for Goiânia EC for the 2025 season.

== Style of play ==
Zotti is considered a classic midfielder, capable of controlling the game precisely and rhythmic touches of the ball. He is also notable for his great finishing ability.

== Honours ==
Atlético Mineiro

- Campeonato Brasileiro Série B: 2006

Cabofriense

- Campeonato Carioca Série A2: 2010

Vila Nova

- Campeonato Brasileiro Série C: 2015

Brasiliense

- Copa Verde: 2020
- Campeonato Brasiliense: 2021, 2022
