= Marcão (footballer, born 1985) =

Brazilian footballer

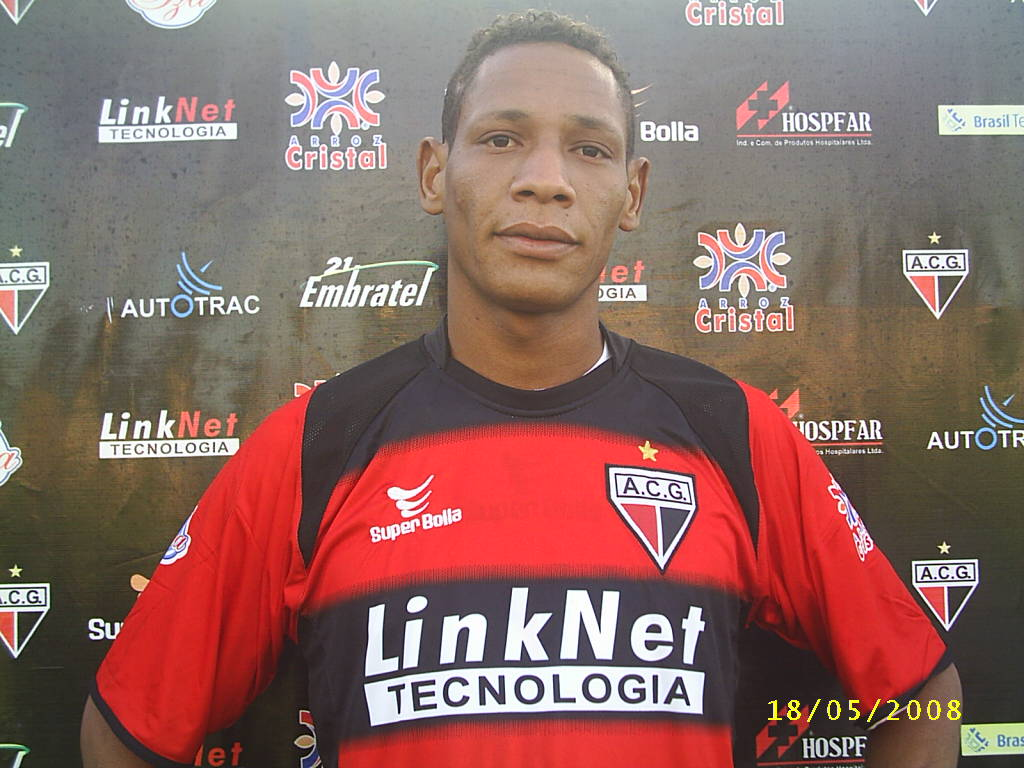
- Marcão in 2008

Personal information
- Full name: Marcos Assis de Santana
- Date of birth: September 25, 1985 (age 41)
- Place of birth: Camaçari, Brazil
- Height: 1.90 m (6 ft 3 in)
- Position: Forward

Team information
- Current team: Bento Gonçalves

Senior career*
Years	Team	Apps	(Gls)
2007–2008	Ipitanga		
2008–2012	Atlético Goianiense	87	(23)
2012–2016	Atlético Paranaense	23	(12)
2013	→ América-MG (loan)	15	(1)
2014	→ Bahia (loan)	0	(0)
2014–2015	→ Figueirense (loan)	46	(8)
2016	→ Al-Shaab (loan)	0	(0)
2016	→ Goiás (loan)	13	(3)
2017	Botafogo FC	10	(2)
2017	Paysandu	28	(4)
2018	CRB	0	(0)
2018	Guarani	12	(0)
2019	São Luiz	0	(0)
2019	Remo	5	(0)
2020–	Bento Gonçalves	0	(0)
- * Club domestic league appearances and goals as of 22:36, 29 March 2020 (UTC)

Marcos Assis de Santana, also known as Marcão (born September 25, 1985), is a Brazilian professional footballer who plays as a striker for Bento Gonçalves.

== Career ==
Marcão was born in Camaçari. He began his professional career at Ipitanga of Bahia, where it was called "Marquinhos". But before his stature began to be called when Marcão was playing at Atlético Goianiense from 2008.

Série C was the top scorer in 2008 with Atletico Goianiense. It is the top scorer in the Série C of all time with 25 goals.

== Honours ==
Atlético Goianiense

- Goiás State League: 2010
- Brazilian Série C: 2008
