= Mário Sérgio (footballer, born 1995) =

Brazilian footballer

Personal information
- Full name: Mário Sérgio Pereira Júnior
- Date of birth: 2 September 1995 (age 31)
- Place of birth: Candeias, Brazil
- Height: 1.81 m (5 ft 11 in)
- Position: Forward

Team information
- Current team: Hokkaido Consadole Sapporo
- Number: 9

Youth career
- Bahia

Senior career*
Years	Team	Apps	(Gls)
2015–2018	Bahia	11	(1)
2017	→ Botafogo-SP (loan)	5	(1)
2018	→ Botafogo-PB (loan)	22	(5)
2019	Remo	13	(2)
2020	Botafogo-PB	10	(1)
2022	Fluminense-PI	28	(21)
2022–2025	Mirassol	5	(0)
2023–	→ Paysandu (loan)	22	(9)
2024–2025	Chapecoense	37	(10)
2025–	Hokkaido Consadole Sapporo	15	(4)
- * Club domestic league appearances and goals as of 1 January 2026

Mário Sérgio Pereira Júnior (born 2 September 1995), known as Mário Sérgio, is a Brazilian footballer who plays as a forward for Hokkaido Consadole Sapporo.

== Career ==
=== Bahia ===
Born in Candeias, Bahia, Mário Sérgio began his professional career in 2015 at Bahia. He stayed until 2018, where he was part of the squad that won the Copa do Nordeste in 2017.

=== Remo ===
In 2019, he signed with Remo. He played 14 games, scored two goals, and was champion of the Campeonato Paraense. However, he was dismissed from the club during the season.

=== Fluminense-PI ===
In 2022, he lived the best phase of his career with Fluminense-PI. With 24 goals in 30 games and a Campeonato Piauiense title, he became nationally known as one of Brazil's top scorers that year.

== Honours ==
Bahia

- Copa do Nordeste: 2017

Botafogo-PB

- Campeonato Paraibano: 2018

Remo

- Campeonato Paraense: 2019

Fluminense-PI

- Campeonato Piauiense: 2022

Mirassol

- Campeonato Brasileiro Série C: 2022
