= Danillo Bala =

Brazilian footballer (born 1993)

Personal information
- Full name: Danillo Souza Muniz
- Date of birth: January 1, 1993 (age 33)
- Place of birth: Propiá, Sergipe, Brazil
- Height: 1.66 m (5 ft 5 in)
- Positions: Right wing; forward

Team information
- Current team: Sousa

Senior career*
| Years | Team | Apps | (Gls) |
| 2015 | Lagarto | 4 | (1) |
| 2015 | Dorense | | |
| 2016 | Confiança | 17 | (5) |
| 2016 | Montana | 2 | (1) |
| 2017 | Juazeirense | 9 | (2) |
| 2017 | Boa Esporte | 0 | (0) |
| 2017 | Moto Club | 9 | (1) |
| 2017–2018 | Uberlândia | 7 | (0) |
| 2018 | Campinense | 7 | (2) |
| 2018 | Vardar | 0 | (0) |
| 2018–2019 | São Bento | 0 | (0) |
| 2018 | → Rio Claro (loan) | | |
| 2019 | → CRB (loan) | 0 | (0) |
| 2019–2020 | Remo | 0 | (0) |
| 2024– | Sousa | 5 | (2) |
- * Club domestic league appearances and goals as of 00:46, 21 June 2019 (UTC)

Danillo Souza Muniz (born 5 May 1993), known as Danillo Bala, is a Brazilian footballer who plays for Sousa Esporte Clube a club in Brazil.

== Career ==
In June 2016, Bala signed with Bulgarian side Montana; the duration of the contract remained undisclosed. He was released on 22 November 2016 after featuring rarely for the team.

In December 2016, Bala joined Juazeirense, signing a 1-year contract.
