= David Batista (footballer) =

Brazilian footballer (born 1989)

Personal information
- Full name: David Henrique Oliveira Batista
- Date of birth: 13 April 1989 (age 37)
- Place of birth: São Paulo, Brazil
- Height: 1.81 m (5 ft 11 1/2 in)
- Position: Centre-forward

Team information
- Current team: Taubaté

Senior career*
Years	Team	Apps	(Gls)
2009	Espoli	8	(0)
2011	Ivinhema		
2011	Caxias		
2011	Ivinhema		
2012	Comercial		
2013	Ivinhema		
2013	Ubiratan		
2014	Paulista	0	(0)
2014	Sampaio Corrêa	10	(1)
2014	Gil Vicente	5	(0)
2015	XV de Piracicaba	0	(0)
2016	Barretos	0	(0)
2016–2017	Volta Redonda	28	(13)
2018	Tubarão	0	(0)
2018	Cuiabá	4	(1)
2018–2019	Al-Mujazzal		
2019	Remo	6	(0)
2019	Joinville	5	(1)
2019	Marcílio Dias		
2020–	Taubaté	0	(0)
- * Club domestic league appearances and goals as of 19:43, 13 July 2019 (UTC)

David Henrique Oliveira Batista (born 13 April 1989) is a Brazilian professional footballer who plays for Esporte Clube Taubaté.
