= Paulinho (footballer, born 1984) =

Brazilian footballer

Personal information
- Full name: Paulo César Elias
- Date of birth: 15 October 1984 (age 42)
- Place of birth: Guaranésia, Brazil
- Height: 1.80 m (5 ft 11 in)
- Position: Left back

Team information
- Current team: Novorizontino (assistant coach)

Youth career
- 2004: Radium

Senior career*
Years	Team	Apps	(Gls)
2004	Radium		
2005–2006	Esportivo-MG		
2006	Vila Aurora		
2006–2007	Chapadão		
2009–2010	Luverdense		
2009–2010	→ Novo Hamburgo (loan)	19	(5)
2010	→ Atlético Paranaense (loan)	29	(0)
2011–2012	Atlético Paranaense	26	(0)
2012	→ Atlético Goianiense (loan)	3	(0)
2013	Avaí	15	(1)
2013–2014	Paraná	30	(0)
2014	Novo Hamburgo	0	(0)
2014–2015	Luverdense	22	(1)
2015	Novo Hamburgo	0	(0)
2015–2018	Luverdense	122	(5)
2016	→ Novorizontino (loan)	21	(0)
2018	→ CRB (loan)	13	(1)
2019–2022	Novorizontino	80	(1)
2019	→ Cuiabá (loan)	30	(3)

Managerial career
- 2023–: Novorizontino (assistant)
- * Club domestic league appearances and goals

Paulo Cesar Elias, better known as Paulinho, (born 15 October 1984) is a Brazilian football coach and a former left back. He is an assistant coach for Novorizontino.

== Career statistics ==
(Correct as of October 16, 2010)

Club	Season	State League		Brazilian Série A		Copa do Brasil		Copa Libertadores		Copa Sudamericana		Total	
Club	Season	Apps	Goals	Apps	Goals	Apps	Goals	Apps	Goals	Apps	Goals	Apps	Goals
Atlético Paranaense	2010	-	-	23	0	-	-	-	-	-	-	23	0
Total		-	-	23	0	-	-	-	-	-	-	23	0
