= Diogo Sodré =

Brazilian footballer (born 1991)

Personal information
- Full name: Diogo Henrique Sodré
- Date of birth: 21 March 1991 (age 35)
- Place of birth: São José dos Campos, Brazil
- Height: 1.81 m (5 ft 11 1/2 in)
- Position: Attacking midfielder

Team information
- Current team: Onisilos Sotira

Youth career
- São Paulo
- Santo André
- 2010: Cruzeiro

Senior career*
Years	Team	Apps	(Gls)
2008–2010	Santo André	0	(0)
2010	Cruzeiro	0	(0)
2010	→ Poços de Caldas (loan)	4	(1)
2010	→ SE Patrocinense (loan)	3	(0)
2011	Concórdia	1	(0)
2011	Paulista	0	(0)
2011–2014	El Jaish	?	(33)
2014–2016	Coritiba	0	(0)
2014	→ Bragantino (loan)	5	(0)
2016	→ Luverdense (loan)	16	(1)
2017–2018	Luverdense	12	(0)
2019	Remo	0	(0)
2019–	Onisilos Sotira	15	(3)
- * Club domestic league appearances and goals as of 20:49, 21 May 2020 (UTC)

Diogo Henrique Sodré (born 21 March 1991) is a Brazilian footballer who plays for Cypriot club Onisilos Sotira as an attacking midfielder.

== Club career ==
Born in São José dos Campos, São Paulo, Sodré finished his formation with Santo André. In 2010, he moved to Cruzeiro, being subsequently loaned to Poços de Caldas and Patrocinense.

In the 2011 summer, after representing Concórdia and Paulista, Sodré moved abroad for the first time in his career, joining El Jaish SC. After scoring 33 goals under the course of three campaigns he returned to Brazil, signing a three-year deal with Coritiba on 4 January 2014.

On 11 August 2014 Sodré was loaned to Bragantino, until the end of the year. He made his professional debut on the 23rd, coming on as a late substitute in a 0–1 away loss against Paraná for the Série B championship.
