= 2020 Copa Verde =

7th edition of a Brazilian association football competition

Tournament details
- Country: Brazil
- Dates: 20 January 2021 – 24 February 2021
- Teams: 24

Final positions
- Champions: (Federal District (Brazil)) Brasiliense (1st title)
- Runners-up: (Pará) Remo

Tournament statistics
- Matches played: 30
- Goals scored: 109 (3.63 per match)
- Top goal scorer(s): (Brazil) Alan Mineiro (Brazil) Diego Rosa (5 goals each)

The 2020 Copa Verde was the seventh edition of the football competition held in Brazil. Featuring 24 clubs, Acre, Amazonas, Distrito Federal, Espírito Santo, Mato Grosso do Sul and Pará have two vacancies; Amapá, Goiás, Mato Grosso, Rondônia, Roraima and Tocantins with one each. The others six berths was set according to CBF ranking. Due to the COVID-19 pandemic the tournament was rescheduled, starting only on 20 January 2021 and ending on 24 February 2021.

In the finals, Brasiliense defeated Remo 5–4 on penalties after tied 3–3 on aggregate to win their first title and a place in the third round of the 2021 Copa do Brasil.

== Qualified teams ==
Association	Team	Qualification method
(Acre (state)) Acre; 2+1 berths	Atlético Acreano	2019 Campeonato Acriano champions
(Acre (state)) Acre; 2+1 berths	Galvez	2019 Campeonato Acriano runners-up
(Acre (state)) Acre; 2+1 berths	Rio Branco	4th best placed team in the 2020 CBF ranking not already qualified
(Amapá) Amapá; 1 berth	Santos	2019 Campeonato Amapaense champions
(Amazonas (Brazilian state)) Amazonas; 2 berths	Manaus	2019 Campeonato Amazonense champions
(Amazonas (Brazilian state)) Amazonas; 2 berths	Fast Clube	2019 Campeonato Amazonense runners-up
(Federal District (Brazil)) Distrito Federal; 2 berths	Gama	2019 Campeonato Brasiliense champions
(Federal District (Brazil)) Distrito Federal; 2 berths	Brasiliense	2019 Campeonato Brasiliense runners-up
(Espírito Santo) Espírito Santo; 2 berths	Real Noroeste	2019 Copa Espírito Santo champions
(Espírito Santo) Espírito Santo; 2 berths	Vitória	2019 Copa Espírito Santo runners-up
(Goiás) Goiás; 1+2 berths	Atlético Goianiense	2019 Campeonato Goiano champions
(Goiás) Goiás; 1+2 berths	Vila Nova	2nd best placed team in the 2020 CBF ranking not already qualified
(Goiás) Goiás; 1+2 berths	Aparecidense	5th best placed team in the 2020 CBF ranking not already qualified
(Mato Grosso) Mato Grosso; 1+2 berths	Cuiabá	2019 Campeonato Mato-Grossense champions
(Mato Grosso) Mato Grosso; 1+2 berths	Luverdense	3rd best placed team in the 2020 CBF ranking not already qualified
(Mato Grosso) Mato Grosso; 1+2 berths	Sinop	6th best placed team in the 2020 CBF ranking not already qualified
(Mato Grosso do Sul) Mato Grosso do Sul; 2 berths	Águia Negra	2019 Campeonato Sul-Mato-Grossense champions
(Mato Grosso do Sul) Mato Grosso do Sul; 2 berths	Aquidauanense	2019 Campeonato Sul-Mato-Grossense runners-up
(Pará) Pará; 2+1 berths	Remo	2019 Campeonato Paraense champions
(Pará) Pará; 2+1 berths	Independente	2019 Campeonato Paraense runners-up
(Pará) Pará; 2+1 berths	Paysandu	1st best placed team in the 2020 CBF ranking not already qualified
(Rondônia) Rondônia; 1 berth	Ji-Paraná	2019 Campeonato Rondoniense runners-up
(Roraima) Roraima; 1 berth	São Raimundo	2019 Campeonato Roraimense champions
(Tocantins) Tocantins; 1 berth	Palmas	2019 Campeonato Tocantinense champions

== Schedule ==
The schedule of the competition is as follows.

Stage	First leg	Second leg
First round	20, 21 and 24 January 2021	
Round of 16	24, 25, 27 and 28 January 2021 and 2 February 2021	
Quarter-finals	3, 4 and 5 February 2021	7 and 8 February 2021
Semi-finals	13 and 14 February 2021	18 February 2021
Finals	21 February 2021	24 February 2021

== Bracket ==
First round
(Goiás) Aparecidense	7
(Mato Grosso do Sul) Aquidauanense	0
(Tocantins) Palmas	2
(Espírito Santo) Real Noroeste	0
(Mato Grosso) Sinop	4
(Mato Grosso do Sul) Águia Negra	0
(Federal District (Brazil)) Brasiliense	4
(Espírito Santo) Vitória	0
(Amazonas (Brazilian state)) Manaus	5
(Rondônia) Ji-Paraná	0
(Roraima) São Raimundo	3
(Acre (state)) Galvez	4
(Amapá) Santos	0
(Federal District (Brazil)) Gama	2
(Amazonas (Brazilian state)) Fast Clube	0
(Pará) Independente	2

Round of 16
(Mato Grosso) Cuiabá	2
(Goiás) Aparecidense	1
(Goiás) Vila Nova	3
(Tocantins) Palmas	1
(Goiás) Atlético Goianiense	5
(Mato Grosso) Sinop	1
(Mato Grosso) Luverdense	1
(Federal District (Brazil)) Brasiliense	2
(Acre (state)) Atlético Acreano	1
(Amazonas (Brazilian state)) Manaus	5
(Pará) Paysandu	4
(Acre (state)) Galvez	1
(Pará) Remo	1
(Federal District (Brazil)) Gama	0
(Acre (state)) Rio Branco	1
(Pará) Independente	3

Quarter-finals
(Mato Grosso) Cuiabá	1	0	1
(Goiás) Vila Nova	0	3	3
(Goiás) Atlético Goianiense	1	1	2
(Federal District (Brazil)) Brasiliense	2	3	5
(Amazonas (Brazilian state)) Manaus	1	2	3
(Pará) Paysandu	1	1	2
(Pará) Remo (p)	2	1	3 (3)
(Pará) Independente	0	3	3 (0)

Semi-finals
(Goiás) Vila Nova	0	3	3 (3)
(Federal District (Brazil)) Brasiliense (p)	2	1	3 (5)
(Amazonas (Brazilian state)) Manaus	1	2	3
(Pará) Remo	1	6	7

Finals
(Federal District (Brazil)) Brasiliense (p)	2	1	3 (5)
(Pará) Remo	1	2	3 (4)

== Finals ==
21 February 2021
15:30 BRT (UTC−3)

Brasiliense (Federal District (Brazil))	2–1	(Pará) Remo
Sandy 31'; Aldo 79'	Report	Wallace 22'

Estádio Nacional Mané Garrincha, Brasília
Attendance: 0
Referee: Dyorgines José Padovani de Andrade

24 February 2021
16:00 BRT (UTC−3)

Remo (Pará)	2–1	(Federal District (Brazil)) Brasiliense
Fredson 26'; Rafael Jansen 61'	Report	Zé Eduardo 49'
Penalties
Felipe Gedoz (penalty scored); Lucas Siqueira (penalty missed); Laílson (penalty scored); Wallace (penalty scored); Rafael Jansen (penalty scored); Wellington Silva (penalty missed)	4–5	(penalty scored) Peu; (penalty scored) Aldo; (penalty missed) Sandy; (penalty scored) Jefferson Maranhão; (penalty scored) Romarinho; (penalty scored) Diogo

Mangueirão, Belém
Attendance: 0
Referee: Jefferson Ferreira de Moraes

Tied 3–3 on aggregate, Brasiliense won on penalties.
