= Josiel (footballer, born 1999) =

Brazilian footballer

Personal information
- Full name: Josiel Ortega Arruda
- Date of birth: 13 March 1999 (age 27)
- Place of birth: Várzea Grande, Brazil
- Height: 1.82 m (6 ft 0 in)
- Position: Forward

Team information
- Current team: América de Natal (on loan from Primavera)

Youth career
- 2017: Mixto
- 2018–2019: Nacional-SP
- 2018: → Grêmio (loan)
- 2019: Cuiabá

Senior career*
Years	Team	Apps	(Gls)
2019–2023	Cuiabá	15	(3)
2020	→ Azuriz (loan)	6	(0)
2021–2022	→ Ponte Preta (loan)	16	(1)
2023–2024	Santo André	9	(1)
2024	Primavera	0	(0)
2024	Pouso Alegre	12	(2)
2024–	Primavera	5	(1)
2024	→ Zinza (loan)	0	(0)
2025	→ Cascavel (loan)	25	(6)
2026–	→ América de Natal (loan)	0	(0)
- * Club domestic league appearances and goals as of 7 March 2026

Josiel Ortega Arruda (born 13 March 1999), simply known as Josiel, is a Brazilian professional footballer who plays for Série D club América de Natal on loan from Primavera. Mainly a forward, he can also play as a right back.

== Club career ==
Josiel joined Nacional-SP's youth setup in 2018, after starting out at Mixto, but was subsequently loaned to Grêmio. He returned to NAC in January 2019, but joined Cuiabá in February.

Josiel made his first team debut for Cuiabá on 7 August 2019, coming on as a second-half substitute in a 2–1 away win against Iporá, for the year's Copa Verde. He then featured rarely for the main squad before moving on loan to Azuriz in September 2020.

Josiel returned to the Dourado in December 2020, and started to feature more regularly with the club in the 2021 Campeonato Mato-Grossense.

== Career statistics ==
As of 29 October 2021

Club	Season	League			State League		Cup		Continental		Other		Total	
Club	Season	Division	Apps	Goals	Apps	Goals	Apps	Goals	Apps	Goals	Apps	Goals	Apps	Goals
Cuiabá	2019	Série B	3	0	0	0	0	0	—		14 (Note: Four appearances in Copa Verde, ten appearances and five goals in Copa FMF)	5	17	5
Cuiabá	2020	Série B	1	0	1	0	0	0	—		2 (Note: Appearance(s) in Copa Verde)	0	4	0
Cuiabá	2021	Série A	0	0	12	4	2	0	—		—		14	4
Cuiabá	Total		4	0	13	4	2	0	—		16	5	35	9
Azuriz (loan)	2020	Paranaense 2ª Divisão	—		6	0	—		—		—		6	0
Ponte Preta (loan)	2021	Série B	11	0	—		—		—		—		11	0
Career total			15	0	19	4	2	0	0	0	16	5	52	9

== Honours ==
Cuiabá

- Copa Verde: 2019
- Campeonato Mato-Grossense: 2021

Azuriz

- Campeonato Paranaense 2ª Divisão: 2020
