= Bruno Oliveira (footballer, born 1993) =

Brazilian footballer

Personal information
- Full name: Bruno Antunes de Oliveira
- Date of birth: 11 January 1993 (age 33)
- Place of birth: Pindamonhangaba, Brazil
- Height: 1.71 m (5 ft 7 in)
- Position: Right-back

Team information
- Current team: Madureira

Youth career
- Mirassol
- 2010–2013: Palmeiras

Senior career*
Years	Team	Apps	(Gls)
2012–2017	Palmeiras	4	(0)
2014	→ Guarani (loan)	0	(0)
2014	→ Oeste (loan)	0	(0)
2015	→ Penapolense (loan)	3	(0)
2016	→ Vila Nova (loan)	11	(0)
2017	→ Bragantino (loan)	29	(2)
2018	Mirassol	3	(0)
2018	Nacional (SP)	3	(0)
2019	Paysandu	11	(1)
2020	Águia de Marabá	7	(1)
2020	Marília	3	(0)
2021–	Zakho	12	(0)
- * Club domestic league appearances and goals as of 12:29, 12 October 2020 (UTC)

Bruno Antunes de Oliveira (born 11 January 1993), known as Bruno Oliveira or simply Bruno, is a Brazilian professional footballer who plays for Madureira as a right-back.

== Career ==
Born in Pindamonhangaba, Bruno Oliveira joined Palmeiras' youth setup in 2010, aged 17, after a short stint with Mirassol. On 25 November 2012 he played his first match as a professional, starting and playing the full 90 minutes in a 1–2 home loss against Atlético Goianiense for the Série A championship.

On 4 October 2013, Bruno Oliveira signed a new four-year deal with Verdão. After being sparingly used, he joined Guarani on loan until the end of the year on 1 May of the following year.
