= Thiago Primão =

Brazilian footballer

Personal information
- Full name: Thiago de Almeida Primão
- Date of birth: 11 February 1993 (age 33)
- Place of birth: Curitiba (PR – Brazil)
- Height: 1.63 m (5 ft 4 in)
- Positions: Defender; midfielder

Team information
- Current team: São Bento

Youth career
- 2010–2012: Coritiba

Senior career*
Years	Team	Apps	(Gls)
2012–2014	Coritiba	11	(0)
2013	→ Foz do Iguaçu (loan)		
2014	→ Atlético Sorocaba (loan)		
2014	→ Atlético Goianiense (loan)	10	(3)
2015	Atlético Goianiense	7	(0)
2015–2016	Ohod Club	?	(?)
2016	Botafogo-SP	3	(0)
2017	Santa Cruz	26	(0)
2018	Londrina	1	(0)
2018	Riga	6	(2)
2019	Paysandu	12	(0)
2020–	São Bento	3	(0)
- * Club domestic league appearances and goals as of 21:56, 14 September 2020 (UTC)

Thiago de Almeida Primão (born 11 February 1993 in Curitiba), known as Thiago Primão, is a Brazilian footballer who plays as midfielder for São Bento. He previously made several Brazilian Serie A appearances for Coritiba. He came from Coritiba youth team.

== Statistics ==
=== Coritiba ===
Years	Matches	Goals	Club
2012	12	0	BrazilCoritiba
2013	1	1	BrazilCoritiba
