= Yuri Naves =

Brazilian footballer

Yuri
Personal information
- Full name: Yuri Naves Roberto
- Date of birth: 7 October 1989 (age 37)
- Place of birth: Rio Negro, Brazil
- Height: 1.80 m (5 ft 11 in)
- Position: Midfielder

Youth career
- Atlético Mineiro

Senior career*
Years	Team	Apps	(Gls)
2008–2011	Atlético Mineiro	11	(0)
2009	→ Tombense (loan)	0	(0)
2009–2011	→ Marítimo (loan)	3	(0)
2011	→ Boa Esporte (loan)	0	(0)
2012	Boa Esporte	7	(0)
2012	→ Goiás (loan)	0	(0)
2013	Goiás	6	(0)
2014	Náutico	19	(0)
2015–2016	Caldense	16	(0)
2015	→ Joinville (loan)	4	(0)
2016	→ Remo (loan)	32	(3)
2017	CRB	45	(1)
2018	Sampaio Corrêa	15	(0)
2018	Botafogo-SP	20	(0)
2019	Mirassol	7	(0)
2019	Remo	26	(1)
2020	Caxias	19	(0)
2020–2021	Vila Nova	21	(0)
2021	Floresta	17	(0)
2022	União Frederiquense	7	(0)
2022	Betim	20	(1)
2022	Boston City Brasil	6	(0)

Managerial career
- 2023: Boston City Brasil (coordinator)
- 2024: Vila Nova (youth coordinator)
- 2025: Vila Nova (coordinator)
- 2026–: Nação (coordinator)
- * Club domestic league appearances and goals

Yuri Naves Roberto (born 7 October 1989), commonly known as Yuri and Yuri Naves, is a Brazilian former professional footballer who played as a midfielder.

== Career ==
A product of Atlético Mineiro's youth academy, Naves played for several clubs throughout his career, most notably CS Marítimo, CRB, and Vila Nova. He retired in 2022 while playing for Boston City Brasil.

== Post-career ==
Shortly after retiring, he became a scout for Boston City and was subsequently promoted to coordinator. Following the club's strong performance in the Copa São Paulo de Futebol Júnior (in partnership with Sãocarlense), Naves was hired by Vila Nova to coordinate its youth divisions. A year later, he was promoted to the club's general football coordinator, a position he held for one year. He is currently the coordinator for Nação Esportes.

== Honours ==
Goiás

- Campeonato Goiano: 2013

CRB

- Campeonato Alagoano: 2017

Sampaio Corrêa

- Copa do Nordeste: 2018

Remo

- Campeonato Paraense: 2019

Vila Nova

- Campeonato Brasileiro Série C: 2020
