= Romarinho (footballer, born June 1990) =

Brazilian footballer

Personal information
- Full name: Francisco Romario da Silva Lima
- Date of birth: 16 June 1990 (age 36)
- Place of birth: Palhano, Brazil
- Height: 1.80 m (5 ft 11 in)
- Position: Forward

Senior career*
Years	Team	Apps	(Gls)
2011	Uniclinic		
2011	Horizonte		
2012–2013	Santa Quitéria		
2013	Grêmio Maringá		
2014	Crateús		
2015	Bosque Formosa		
2016–2017	Ceilândia	19	(5)
2017–2021	Brasiliense	80	(20)
2017	→ Portuguesa (loan)	10	(1)
2018	→ CRAC (loan)		
2022–2024	Ceilândia	29	(16)
2023	→ Samambaia (loan)	3	(0)
2024	Manauara	16	(8)
2025–	Ceilândia	6	(2)
- * Club domestic league appearances and goals as of 29 May 2025

Francisco Romario da Silva Lima (born 16 June 1990), better known as Romarinho, is a Brazilian professional footballer who plays as a forward.

== Career ==
Born in Ceará, Romarinho has made a name for himself over the years, especially playing for the Brasiliense FC and Ceilândia EC in the Campeonato Brasileiro Série D, where he scored 28 goals in total until the 2024 edition. Romarinho also won a state title and the 2020 Copa Verde with Brasiliense, and in 2024, he was local champion again with Ceilândia. In April 2024, he was announced as a reinforcement of Manauara EC.

In April 2025, Romarinho returned to Ceilândia.

== Honours ==
Brasiliense

- Copa Verde: 2020
- Campeonato Brasiliense: 2021

Ceilândia

- Campeonato Brasiliense: 2024
