= Alex Sandro (footballer, born 1995) =

Brazilian footballer

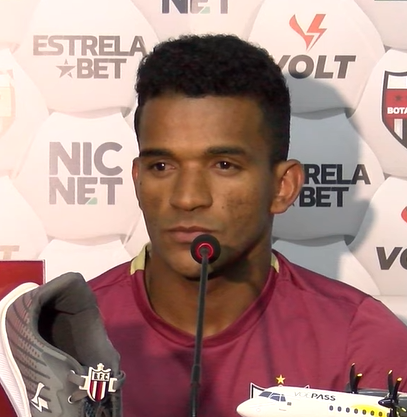
- Alex Sandro in 2024

Personal information
- Full name: Alex Sandro de Oliveira
- Date of birth: 20 August 1995 (age 31)
- Place of birth: Petrolina, Brazil
- Height: 1.75 m (5 ft 9 in)
- Position: Forward

Team information
- Current team: Santa Cruz
- Number: 29

Youth career
- 2011–2013: Petrolina
- 2014: Sampaio Corrêa
- 2015: Cruzeiro

Senior career*
Years	Team	Apps	(Gls)
2013	Petrolina	13	(1)
2016	Campinense	7	(2)
2017	Cuiabá	3	(1)
2017	Juazeirense	12	(5)
2018	Globo	25	(4)
2018–2020	Juazeiro	0	(0)
2019	→ Remo (loan)	20	(4)
2020	→ Brusque (loan)	19	(2)
2021	Chungnam Asan	30	(7)
2022–2023	Brusque	43	(13)
2023	Tombense	34	(7)
2024	Botafogo-SP	36	(6)
2025	Inter de Limeira	12	(1)
2025	Amazonas	7	(0)
2025–2026	Truong Tuoi Dong Nai	22	(10)
2026–	Santa Cruz	0	(0)
- * Club domestic league appearances and goals as of 9 November 2026

Alex Sandro de Oliveira (born 20 August 1995), better known as Alex Sandro is a Brazilian professional footballer who plays as a forward for Santa Cruz.

== Career ==
Born in Petrolina, Pernamuco, Alex Sandro stood out especially for Remo and Brusque, teams for which he was state champion. He also had notable spells at Tombense and Botafogo-SP, being hired in 2025 by Inter de Limeira.

On 4 August 2025, Alex Sandro signed his transfer to Truong Tuoi Dong Nai in Vietnam.

== Honours ==
Remo

- Campeonato Paraense: 2019

Brusque

- Campeonato Catarinense: 2022
- Recopa Catarinense: 2020

Truong Tuoi Dong Nai

- V.League 2: 2025–26

Individual

- Campeonato Catarinense top scorer: 2022
