= Victor Luiz (footballer, born April 1997) =

Brazilian footballer

Personal information
- Full name: Victor Luiz Pereira Silva
- Date of birth: 3 April 1997 (age 29)
- Place of birth: São Paulo, Brazil
- Height: 1.87 m (6 ft 2 in)
- Position: Left-back

Team information
- Current team: Ponte Preta

Youth career
- –2012: União Mogi
- 2014–2017: São Caetano

Senior career*
Years	Team	Apps	(Gls)
2017	EC São Bernardo	11	(1)
2018	Septemvri Sofia	4	(0)
2019	Remo	0	(0)
2019–2020	Londrina	4	(0)
2020	São Caetano	8	(0)
2021	EC São Bernardo		
2022–	Ponte Preta	0	(0)
- * Club domestic league appearances and goals as of 13:41, 6 June 2022 (UTC)

Victor Luiz Pereira Silva (born 3 April 1997) is a Brazilian footballer who plays as a left-back for Ponte Preta.
