= Douglas Packer =

Brazilian footballer (born 1987)

Personal information
- Full name: Douglas Ricardo Packer
- Date of birth: 13 March 1987 (age 39)
- Place of birth: Indaial, Brazil
- Height: 1.78 m (5 ft 10 in)
- Position: Midfielder

Youth career
- 2005: Ipatinga

Senior career*
Years	Team	Apps	(Gls)
2005–2007	Juventus	4	(0)
2005–2007	→ Siena (loan)	2	(0)
2007–2012	Siena	14	(0)
2007–2008	→ Pescara (loan)	7	(12)
2009–2010	→ Ravenna (loan)	22	(3)
2011–2012	→ Paraná (loan)	26	(1)
2012	Paraná	18	(3)
2013	Botafogo-SP	17	(20)
2013	Cuiabá	7	(0)
2014	Atlético Sorocaba	14	(1)
2014	Treze	6	(0)
2014	Ermis Aradippou	8	(14)
2014–2015	CRB	1	(0)
2015	Caxias	15	(18)
2016	Guarani	20	(29)
2016–2017	Südtirol	9	(0)
2017–2018	Barito Putera	61	(18)
2019	Remo	13	(1)
2019	Valletta	7	(2)
2020	Remo	11	(2)
2020	Treze	10	(1)
2020–2021	Joinville	29	(1)
2022	Marcílio Dias	26	(3)
Total		347	(129)
- * Club domestic league appearances and goals

Douglas Ricardo Packer (born 13 March 1987), better known as Packer, is a Brazilian former professional footballer who played as a midfielder.

== Career ==
Born in Indaial, Santa Catarina, Packer started his career at Ipatinga. He signed a professional contract on 1 August 2005, for three years.

On 31 August 2005, he was signed by Juventus, and loaned to A.C. Siena for two seasons. In summer 2007, Siena bought half of the player's rights, for €150,000, and loaned Packer to Pescara Calcio of Serie C1. He returned to Siena for the 2008–09 season.

He signed a five-year contract in summer 2009. In the same summer he left for Ravenna Calcio. In January 2011 Packer returned to Brazil for Paraná Clube in a temporary deal.

== Honours ==
Ermis Aradippou

- Cypriot Super Cup: 2014

Remo

- Campeonato Paraense: 2019
