= Aldo (footballer, born 1988) =

Brazilian footballer

Personal information
- Full name: Aldo Rodrigues de Sousa
- Date of birth: 11 February 1988 (age 38)
- Place of birth: Brasília, Brazil
- Height: 1.73 m (5 ft 8 in)
- Position: Right back

Team information
- Current team: Brasiliense

Youth career
- 2006: ADO Den Haag (Loan)
- 2006: Cruzeiro

Senior career*
Years	Team	Apps	(Gls)
2006	Cruzeiro	3	(0)
2007	→ América-MG (Loan)		
2007	Cruzeiro		
2007–2008	→ Cabofriense (Loan)		
2008	→ CRB (Loan)		
2009	→ Itaúna (Loan)		
2009	Ceilandense		
2010–2011	Araxá		
2011–	Grêmio B		
- * Club domestic league appearances and goals

Aldo Rodrigues de Sousa or simply Aldo (born 11 February 1988), is a Brazilian right back. He currently plays for Grêmio reserves team.

Made his professional debut in the Campeonato Brasileiro for Cruzeiro against São Caetano in a 3–0 home win on 26 August 2006. Aldo debut

== Contract ==
- Cabofriense (Loan) 5 December 2007 to 31 December 2008
- Cruzeiro 16 November 2006 to 15 November 2009
