= Eduardo Echeverría =

Paraguayan footballer (born 1989)

Personal information
- Full name: Eduardo Alberto Echeverría Espinola
- Date of birth: 4 March 1989 (age 37)
- Place of birth: Asunción, Paraguay
- Height: 1.76 m (5 ft 9 in)
- Positions: Attacking midfielder; winger

Team information
- Current team: Volta Redonda

Senior career*
Years	Team	Apps	(Gls)
2009–2010	Silvio Pettirossi	22	(2)
2011–2012	Sportivo Carapeguá	70	(1)
2012	LDU Quito	19	(2)
2013	Manta	30	(5)
2014	Rubio Ñu	19	(0)
2016	Feirense	3	(0)
2016–2017	→ ABC (loan)	59	(14)
2018	CSA	9	(1)
2019	Remo		
2019–	Volta Redonda	0	(0)

International career
2012	Paraguay	1	(0)
- * Club domestic league appearances and goals as of 22:18, 19 June 2019 (UTC)

Eduardo Echeverría (born 4 March 1989) is a Paraguayan international footballer who plays for Volta Redonda as an attacking midfielder and winger. On November 24, 2019, Echeverría signed a contract with Toronto FC.

== Career ==
Echeverría has played for Silvio Pettirossi, Sportivo Carapeguá and LDU Quito.

He made his international debut for Paraguay in 2012.

== Honours ==
ABC

- Copa RN: 2016
- Campeonato Potiguar: 2016

CSA

- Campeonato Alagoano: 2018
