= Marcão (footballer, born 1995) =

Brazilian footballer

Personal information
- Full name: Marcos Wilson da Silva
- Date of birth: August 17, 1995 (age 31)
- Place of birth: Rio de Janeiro, Brazil
- Height: 1.93 m (6 ft 4 in)
- Position: Centre back

Team information
- Current team: Altos

Senior career*
Years	Team	Apps	(Gls)
2014–2015	Audax Rio	12	(1)
2016	Luverdense	0	(0)
2017	Itapipoca	3	(0)
2017	Alecrim	7	(0)
2017	Tupi	3	(0)
2018	Treze	2	(0)
2019–2021	Marítimo	9	(0)
2019	→ Remo (loan)	27	(3)
2020	→ Sampaio Corrêa (loan)	6	(0)
2021	Londrina	2	(0)
2022	Paysandu	10	(1)
2023	Retrô FC	4	(0)
2023–	Altos	0	(0)
- * Club domestic league appearances and goals as of 18:47, 20 August 2023 (UTC)

Marcos Wilson da Silva (born 17 August 1995), known as Marcão, is a Brazilian professional footballer who plays for Altos as a centre-back.

== Career ==
On 27 June 2018, Marcão signed a five-year contract with Marítimo
