= Rafael Jansen =

Brazilian footballer

Personal information
- Full name: Rafael da Cunha Jansen
- Date of birth: December 3, 1988 (age 37)
- Place of birth: São Luís Gonzaga do Maranhão, Brazil
- Height: 1.85 m (6 ft 1 in)
- Position: Centre back

Team information
- Current team: Sampaio Corrêa

Senior career*
Years	Team	Apps	(Gls)
2011	Sabiá	-	(-)
2012–2013	Tiradentes	2	(0)
2014–2015	Horizonte	8	(0)
2015	Icasa	-	(-)
2016	Tiradentes	11	(1)
2016	Treze	5	(0)
2016–2018	Campinense	57	(2)
2018	Boa Esporte	16	(0)
2019–2021	Remo	104	(4)
2022–2023	Ratchaburi Mitr Phol	20	(0)
2023–	Sampaio Corrêa	9	(0)
- * Club domestic league appearances and goals as of 11 November 2023

Rafael da Cunha Jansen (born December 3, 1988) is a Brazilian professional footballer who plays as a centre back for Sampaio Corrêa.

== Honours ==
Remo

- Campeonato Paraense: 2019
