= 2019 Campeonato Paraense =

Campeonato Paraense
- Season: 2019
- Champions: Remo
- Relegated: São Francisco; São Raimundo
- Série D: Independente; Bragantino
- Copa Verde: Remo; Independente
- Copa do Brasil: Remo; Independente; Bragantino
- Matches: 57
- Goals: 128 (2.25 per match)
- Top goalscorer: Michel (5 goals)
- Biggest home win: Paysandu 4–1 São Francisco (23 January 2019)
- Biggest away win: Independente 0–4 Remo (9 February 2019)
- Highest scoring: São Francisco 4–5 Paragominas (12 February 2019)
- Highest attendance: 24,321; Remo 2–0 Independente (21 April 2019)
- Lowest attendance: 37; São Francisco 2–2 São Raimundo (27 March 2019)

The 2019 Campeonato Paraense was the 107th edition of Pará's top professional football league. The competition started on 19 January and ended on 21 April. Remo won the championship for the 46th time.

== Format ==
The competition will consist of two groups of five teams each, who will face off in round games and back against the other key times in a single turn. The top two will contest the semi-finals in their respective groups, thereby defining the two championship finalists. The losers of the semifinals will make two matches to decide the third place. Semifinal and final matches will round trip.

The worst placed of each group will be relegated to the Second Division.

The champion and the best placed team not qualified via CBF ranking qualify to the 2020 Copa Verde. The champion, the runner-up and the 3rd-placed team qualify to the 2020 Copa do Brasil. The best two teams who isn't on Campeonato Brasileiro Série A, Série B or Série C qualifies to 2020 Campeonato Brasileiro Série D.

== Participating teams ==
Club	Home city	2018 result
Águia de Marabá	Marabá	7th
Bragantino	Bragança	3rd
Castanhal	Castanhal	5th
Independente	Tucuruí	6th
Paragominas	Paragominas	8th
Paysandu	Belém	2nd
Remo	Belém	1st
São Francisco	Santarém	2nd (on 2nd Division)
São Raimundo	Santarém	4th
Tapajós	Santarém	1st (on 2nd Division)

== Group stage ==
=== Group A1 ===
Pos	Team	Pld	W	D	L	GF	GA	GD	Pts	Qualification or relegation
1	Remo (A)	10	5	4	1	15	6	+9	19	Advance to the Final stage
2	Bragantino (A)	10	4	3	3	14	11	+3	15	Advance to the Final stage
3	Águia de Marabá	10	3	4	3	11	11	0	13	
4	Castanhal	10	2	5	3	5	7	−2	11	
5	São Francisco (R)	10	1	3	6	13	24	−11	6	2020 Paraense 2nd Division

Source: Globo Esporte
(A) Advance to a further round; (R) Relegated

=== Group A2 ===
Pos	Team	Pld	W	D	L	GF	GA	GD	Pts	Qualification or relegation
1	Paysandu (A)	10	6	4	0	18	4	+14	22	Advance to the Final stage
2	Independente (A)	10	5	2	3	11	10	+1	17	Advance to the Final stage
3	Paragominas	10	4	4	2	14	13	+1	16	
4	Tapajós	10	1	5	4	8	13	−5	8	
5	São Raimundo (R)	10	0	4	6	8	18	−10	4	2020 Paraense 2nd Division

Source: Globo Esporte
(A) Advance to a further round; (R) Relegated

== Final stage ==
=== Semi-finals ===
==== Semi-final 1 ====
3 April 2019
15:30 UTC –3

Bragantino	0–1	Remo
	Report	Emerson Carioca 90+3'

Diogão, Bragança
Attendance: 4,580
Referee: Gustavo Ramos Melo
7 April 2019
16:00 UTC –3

Remo	0–0	Bragantino
	Report

Mangueirão, Belém
Attendance: 15,259
Referee: Wasley do Couto Leão

Remo won 1–0 on aggregate and advanced to the finals.

==== Semi-final 2 ====
4 April 2019
20:00 UTC –3

Independente	3–1	Paysandu
Joãozinho 45+2' (pen.); Dedé 52', 84'	Report	Nicolas 65'

Navegantão, Tucuruí
Attendance: 1,035
Referee: Djonaltan Costa de Araújo
8 April 2019
20:00 UTC –3

Paysandu	1–0	Independente
Caíque Oliveira 52'	Report

Estádio da Curuzú, Belém
Attendance: 9,507
Referee: Gustavo Ramos Melo

Independente won 3–2 on aggregate and advanced to the finals.

=== Third place play-off ===
13 April 2019
18:30 UTC –3

Bragantino	1–1	Paysandu
Fidélis 77'	Report	Paulo Henrique 86'
Penalties
Lukinha (penalty scored); Keoma (penalty scored); Bruno Limão (penalty scored); Fidélis (penalty scored); Esquerdinha (penalty scored)	5–3	(penalty scored) Paulo Henrique; (penalty scored) Paulo Rangel; (penalty missed) Diego Matos; (penalty scored) Fábio Alemão

Estádio da Curuzú, Belém
Attendance: 963
Referee: Marco José Soares de Almeida

=== Finals ===
14 April 2019
16:00 UTC –3

Independente	1–0	Remo
Marcão 6' (o.g.)	Report

Mangueirão, Belém
Attendance: 8,840
Referee: Gustavo Ramos Melo
21 April 2019
16:00 UTC –3

Remo	2–0	Independente
Yuri 7'; Alex Sandro 85'	Report

Mangueirão, Belém
Attendance: 24,321
Referee: Dewson Fernando Freitas da Silva
