= 2021 Clube do Remo season =

2021 season of Brazilian association football team

Remo
2021 season
- President: Fábio Bentes
- Head coach: Paulo Bonamigo (until 30 June 2021); Felipe Conceição (until 10 November 2021); Eduardo Baptista
- Stadium: Baenão
- Campeonato Brasileiro Série B: 17th (relegated)
- Campeonato Paraense: 3rd
- Copa Verde: Winners
- Copa do Brasil: Third round
- Highest home attendance: 12,702 (vs. Vila Nova, 11 December 2021)
- Lowest home attendance: 1,381 (vs. Galvez, 19 October 2021)
| Home colors | Away colors |

The 2021 season was the 108th in Remo's existence. This season Remo participated in the Campeonato Brasileiro Série B, the Campeonato Paraense, Copa Verde and the Copa do Brasil.

Remo finished the Campeonato Brasileiro Série B in the 17th place, and was relegated to the Série C. In the Campeonato Paraense, the club was eliminated in the semifinals to Tuna Luso and finished in 3rd place after beating Castanhal 3–0 in the third place match. In the Copa Verde, Remo won the unprecedented title in an undefeated way after beating Vila Nova on penalties. The team played seven games, winning three and drawing four. In the Copa do Brasil, Remo was eliminated in the third round by Atlético Mineiro.

== Players ==
=== Squad information ===
Numbers in parentheses denote appearances as substitute.

As of 12 December 2021

| Position | Nat. | Name | Date of Birth (Age) | | |
| Position | Nat. | Name | Date of Birth (Age) | Apps | Goals |
| GK | BRA | Vinícius | 9 November 1984 (aged 37) | 49 | 0 |
| GK | BRA | Thiago Coelho | 26 May 1995 (aged 26) | 13 | 0 |
| GK | BRA | Rodrigo Josviaki | 16 February 1995 (aged 26) | 0 (1) | 0 |
| DF | BRA | Edu | 16 June 2000 (aged 21) | 1 | 1 |
| DF | BRA | Fredson | 30 November 1991 (aged 30) | 20 (4) | 2 |
| DF | BRA | Kevem | 3 March 2000 (aged 21) | 25 (4) | 0 |
| DF | BRA | Rafael Jansen | 3 December 1988 (aged 32) | 38 (2) | 1 |
| DF | BRA | Romércio | 25 February 1997 (aged 24) | 26 (2) | 2 |
| DF | BRA | Thiago Ennes | 5 March 1996 (aged 25) | 36 (10) | 0 |
| DF | BRA | Wellington Silva | 6 March 1988 (aged 33) | 20 (13) | 0 |
| DF | BRA | Igor Fernandes | 6 June 1992 (aged 29) | 28 (2) | 0 |
| DF | BRA | Marlon | 14 September 1985 (aged 36) | 33 (7) | 2 |
| DF | BRA | Raimar | 27 May 2002 (aged 19) | 12 (5) | 0 |
| MF | BRA | Anderson Uchôa | 4 February 1991 (aged 30) | 45 (2) | 3 |
| MF | BRA | Arthur | 21 September 1991 (aged 30) | 20 (11) | 0 |
| MF | BRA | Lucas Siqueira | 23 September 1988 (aged 33) | 50 (1) | 5 |
| MF | BRA | Marcos Júnior | 13 May 1995 (aged 26) | 13 (9) | 2 |
| MF | BRA | Neto Moura | 6 August 1996 (aged 25) | 5 (5) | 1 |
| MF | BRA | Paulinho Curuá | 11 May 1997 (aged 24) | 0 (7) | 0 |
| MF | BRA | Pingo | 29 December 2001 (aged 19) | 7 (17) | 1 |
| MF | BRA | Warley | 10 January 2000 (aged 21) | 3 (2) | 0 |
| MF | BRA | Erick Flores | 30 April 1989 (aged 32) | 19 (9) | 2 |
| MF | BRA | Felipe Gedoz | 12 July 1993 (aged 28) | 48 (3) | 9 |
| MF | BRA | Matheus Oliveira | 28 September 1997 (aged 24) | 17 (3) | 0 |
| MF | BRA | Tiago Miranda | 2 August 1999 (aged 22) | 0 (12) | 0 |
| FW | BRA | Jefferson | 17 January 1997 (aged 24) | 11 (20) | 3 |
| FW | BRA | Lucas Tocantins | 25 July 1994 (aged 27) | 22 (17) | 6 |
| FW | BRA | Neto Pessoa | 16 May 1994 (aged 27) | 12 (3) | 10 |
| FW | BRA | Rafinha | 21 June 1992 (aged 29) | 8 (18) | 1 |
| FW | BRA | Renan Gorne | 22 February 1996 (aged 25) | 24 (20) | 9 |
| FW | BRA | Ronald | 10 August 2002 (aged 19) | 2 (22) | 1 |
| FW | BRA | Tiago Mafra | 21 August 2002 (aged 19) | 2 (5) | 0 |
| FW | BRA | Wallace | 15 December 2000 (aged 20) | 4 (17) | 4 |
Players left the club during the playing season
| DF | BRA | Mimica | 22 November 1985 (aged 35) | 1 (1) | 0 |
| DF | BRA | Suéliton | 26 June 1991 (aged 30) | 3 (1) | 0 |
| DF | BRA | Felippe Borges | 4 December 1999 (aged 21) | 1 (3) | 0 |
| MF | BRA | Jéferson Lima | 7 February 1997 (aged 24) | 2 (5) | 0 |
| MF | BRA | Laílson | 1 January 1998 (aged 23) | 1 (2) | 0 |
| MF | BRA | Vinícius Kiss | 8 June 1988 (aged 33) | 1 (6) | 0 |
| MF | BRA | Dioguinho | 27 December 1995 (aged 25) | 27 (2) | 6 |
| MF | BRA | Renan Oliveira | 29 December 1989 (aged 31) | 3 (9) | 0 |
| FW | BRA | Edson Cariús | 12 October 1988 (aged 32) | 6 (13) | 2 |
| FW | BRA | Gabriel Lima | 27 October 1996 (aged 24) | 2 (10) | 0 |
| FW | BRA | Pepê | 3 May 2002 (aged 19) | 0 (1) | 0 |
| FW | BRA | Victor Andrade | 30 September 1995 (aged 26) | 22 (1) | 3 |

=== Top scorers ===
As of 4 December 2021

| Place | Position | Name | Campeonato Brasileiro Série B | Campeonato Paraense | Copa Verde | Copa do Brasil | Total |
|---|---|---|---|---|---|---|---|
| 1 | FW | Neto Pessoa | 1 | 0 | 9 | 0 | 10 |
| 2 | FW | Renan Gorne | 5 | 4 | 0 | 0 | 9 |
| 2 | MF | Felipe Gedoz | 4 | 4 | 0 | 1 | 9 |
| 4 | FW | Lucas Tocantins | 3 | 2 | 0 | 1 | 6 |
| 4 | MF | Dioguinho | 0 | 6 | 0 | 0 | 6 |
| 6 | MF | Lucas Siqueira | 3 | 2 | 0 | 0 | 5 |
| 7 | FW | Wallace | 0 | 1 | 3 | 0 | 4 |
| 8 | FW | Victor Andrade | 3 | 0 | 0 | 0 | 3 |
| 8 | FW | Jefferson | 3 | 0 | 0 | 0 | 3 |
| 8 | MF | Anderson Uchôa | 1 | 1 | 0 | 1 | 3 |
| 11 | FW | Edson Cariús | 0 | 2 | 0 | 0 | 2 |
| 11 | MF | Erick Flores | 1 | 0 | 1 | 0 | 2 |
| 11 | MF | Marcos Júnior | 2 | 0 | 0 | 0 | 2 |
| 11 | DF | Marlon | 0 | 1 | 1 | 0 | 2 |
| 11 | DF | Romércio | 1 | 0 | 0 | 1 | 2 |
| 11 | DF | Fredson | 0 | 2 | 0 | 0 | 2 |
| 17 | FW | Ronald | 1 | 0 | 0 | 0 | 1 |
| 17 | FW | Rafinha | 0 | 0 | 1 | 0 | 1 |
| 17 | MF | Pingo | 1 | 0 | 0 | 0 | 1 |
| 17 | MF | Neto Moura | 0 | 0 | 1 | 0 | 1 |
| 17 | DF | Edu | 0 | 0 | 1 | 0 | 1 |
| 17 | DF | Rafael Jansen | 0 | 1 | 0 | 0 | 1 |
| Own goals | | | 2 | 1 | 0 | 0 | 3 |

=== Disciplinary record ===
As of 12 December 2021

| Position | Name | Campeonato Brasileiro Série B | | Campeonato Paraense | | Copa Verde | | Copa do Brasil | | Total | |
| Position | Name | Yellow card | Red card | Yellow card | Red card | Yellow card | Red card | Yellow card | Red card | Yellow card | Red card |
| FW | Victor Andrade | 10 | 3 | 0 | 0 | 0 | 0 | 0 | 0 | 10 | 3 |
| FW | Renan Gorne | 1 | 1 | 3 | 1 | 1 | 0 | 0 | 0 | 5 | 2 |
| MF | Anderson Uchôa | 11 | 0 | 3 | 0 | 1 | 1 | 1 | 0 | 16 | 1 |
| MF | Dioguinho | 2 | 1 | 2 | 0 | 0 | 0 | 0 | 0 | 4 | 1 |
| DF | Raimar | 2 | 0 | 0 | 0 | 0 | 1 | 0 | 0 | 2 | 1 |
| DF | Rafael Jansen | 4 | 0 | 3 | 0 | 0 | 0 | 2 | 0 | 9 | 0 |
| MF | Felipe Gedoz | 5 | 0 | 3 | 0 | 1 | 0 | 0 | 0 | 9 | 0 |
| DF | Marlon | 4 | 0 | 2 | 0 | 0 | 0 | 1 | 0 | 7 | 0 |
| MF | Matheus Oliveira | 6 | 0 | 0 | 0 | 1 | 0 | 0 | 0 | 7 | 0 |
| DF | Thiago Ennes | 4 | 0 | 1 | 0 | 1 | 0 | 0 | 0 | 6 | 0 |
| DF | Romércio | 6 | 0 | 0 | 0 | 0 | 0 | 0 | 0 | 6 | 0 |
| MF | Lucas Siqueira | 2 | 0 | 2 | 0 | 2 | 0 | 0 | 0 | 6 | 0 |
| MF | Erick Flores | 3 | 0 | 1 | 0 | 2 | 0 | 0 | 0 | 6 | 0 |
| DF | Fredson | 1 | 0 | 2 | 0 | 2 | 0 | 0 | 0 | 5 | 0 |
| DF | Wellington Silva | 2 | 0 | 2 | 0 | 1 | 0 | 0 | 0 | 5 | 0 |
| MF | Pingo | 5 | 0 | 0 | 0 | 0 | 0 | 0 | 0 | 5 | 0 |
| MF | Marcos Júnior | 5 | 0 | 0 | 0 | 0 | 0 | 0 | 0 | 5 | 0 |
| DF | Igor Fernandes | 4 | 0 | 0 | 0 | 0 | 0 | 0 | 0 | 4 | 0 |
| FW | Jefferson | 3 | 0 | 0 | 0 | 1 | 0 | 0 | 0 | 4 | 0 |
| DF | Kevem | 3 | 0 | 0 | 0 | 0 | 0 | 0 | 0 | 3 | 0 |
| MF | Neto Moura | 0 | 0 | 0 | 0 | 3 | 0 | 0 | 0 | 3 | 0 |
| FW | Edson Cariús | 1 | 0 | 2 | 0 | 0 | 0 | 0 | 0 | 3 | 0 |
| MF | Warley | 2 | 0 | 0 | 0 | 0 | 0 | 0 | 0 | 2 | 0 |
| GK | Vinícius | 1 | 0 | 1 | 0 | 0 | 0 | 0 | 0 | 2 | 0 |
| FW | Rafinha | 2 | 0 | 0 | 0 | 0 | 0 | 0 | 0 | 2 | 0 |
| DF | Mimica | 0 | 0 | 1 | 0 | 0 | 0 | 0 | 0 | 1 | 0 |
| MF | Paulinho Curuá | 0 | 0 | 0 | 0 | 1 | 0 | 0 | 0 | 1 | 0 |
| MF | Laílson | 0 | 0 | 1 | 0 | 0 | 0 | 0 | 0 | 1 | 0 |
| MF | Jéferson Lima | 0 | 0 | 0 | 0 | 0 | 0 | 1 | 0 | 1 | 0 |
| MF | Tiago Miranda | 1 | 0 | 0 | 0 | 0 | 0 | 0 | 0 | 1 | 0 |
| MF | Renan Oliveira | 0 | 0 | 0 | 0 | 0 | 0 | 1 | 0 | 1 | 0 |
| FW | Wallace | 1 | 0 | 0 | 0 | 0 | 0 | 0 | 0 | 1 | 0 |
| FW | Tiago Mafra | 0 | 0 | 0 | 0 | 1 | 0 | 0 | 0 | 1 | 0 |
| FW | Gabriel Lima | 0 | 0 | 1 | 0 | 0 | 0 | 0 | 0 | 1 | 0 |
| FW | Pepê | 0 | 0 | 1 | 0 | 0 | 0 | 0 | 0 | 1 | 0 |
| | TOTALS | 91 | 5 | 31 | 1 | 18 | 2 | 6 | 0 | 146 | 8 |

== Kit ==
Supplier: Kappa (until 8 July 2021); Volt Sport / Main sponsor: Banpará

| Kappa Home (until 8 July 2021) | Kappa Home alt. 1 | Kappa Home alt. 2 | Home | Home alt. 1 | Home alt. 2 | Away | Away alt. 1 | Away alt. 2 |

== Transfers ==
=== Transfers in ===
| Position | Name | From | Type | Source |
|---|---|---|---|---|
| DF | Wellington Silva | (Brazil) Juventude | Transfer | |
| MF | Anderson Uchôa | (Brazil) Paysandu | Transfer | |
| DF | Thiago Ennes | (Brazil) Confiança | Transfer | |
| FW | Renan Gorne | (Brazil) Confiança | Transfer | |
| GK | Rodrigo Josviaki | (Portugal) Vilafranquense | Transfer | |
| MF | Jéferson Lima | (Brazil) Confiança | Transfer | |
| MF | Renan Oliveira | (Lithuania) Sūduva | Transfer | |
| DF | Felippe Borges | (Brazil) Juventude | Transfer | |
| FW | Gabriel Lima | (Brazil) Tombense | Loan | |
| MF | Felipe Gedoz | (Uruguay) Nacional | Transfer | |
| FW | Edson Cariús | (Brazil) Fortaleza | Loan | |
| FW | Lucas Tocantins | (Brazil) Chapecoense | Transfer | |
| MF | Erick Flores | (Brazil) Boavista | Loan | |
| MF | Vinícius Kiss | (Brazil) Botafogo-SP | Transfer | |
| MF | Paulinho Curuá | (Brazil) Tapajós | Loan | |
| FW | Jefferson | (Brazil) Boa Esporte | Transfer | |
| DF | Suéliton | (Brazil) Ituano | Transfer | |
| FW | Rafinha | (Brazil) Mirassol | Transfer | |
| DF | Romércio | (Brazil) Guarani | Transfer | |
| DF | Igor Fernandes | (Brazil) Ferroviária | Transfer | |
| MF | Arthur | (Brazil) Tuna Luso | Transfer | |
| MF | Marcos Júnior | (Brazil) Vasco da Gama | Transfer | |
| FW | Victor Andrade | (South Korea) Suwon FC | Transfer | |
| MF | Matheus Oliveira | (Brazil) Atlético Goianiense | Transfer | |
| DF | Edu | (Brazil) Athletico Paranaense | Loan | |
| DF | Raimar | (Brazil) Athletico Paranaense | Loan | |
| FW | Neto Pessoa | (Brazil) Botafogo-SP | Transfer | |
| MF | Neto Moura | (Brazil) Mirassol | Loan | |

=== Transfers out ===
| Position | Name | To | Type | Source |
|---|---|---|---|---|
| MF | Jéferson Lima | (Brazil) Rio Claro | Rescission | |
| DF | Felippe Borges | Free agent | Rescission | |
| MF | Renan Oliveira | (Brazil) Joinville | Rescission | |
| MF | Laílson | (Brazil) Esportivo | Loan | |
| DF | Mimica | (Brazil) Altos | Rescission | |
| MF | Vinícius Kiss | (Brazil) Figueirense | Rescission | |
| FW | Edson Cariús | (Brazil) Ferroviário | Rescission | |
| FW | Gabriel Lima | (Brazil) São José | Rescission | |
| MF | Dioguinho | (Brazil) Ferroviário | Loan | |
| DF | Suéliton | (Brazil) ABC | Rescission | |
| FW | Victor Andrade | Free agent | Rescission | |

Notes

1. Vinícius Kiss joined Figueirense following his release.
2. Following Mimica's release, he later signed for Altos.
3. Following Renan Oliveira's release, he later signed for Joinville.
4. Following Jéferson Lima's release, he later signed for Rio Claro.

== Competitions ==
| Competition | First match | Last match | Starting round | Final position | Record | | | | | | | |
| Competition | First match | Last match | Starting round | Final position | Pld | W | D | L | GF | GA | GD | Win % |
|---|---|---|---|---|---|---|---|---|---|---|---|---|
| Campeonato Brasileiro Série B | 29 May 2021 | 28 November 2021 | Matchday 1 | 17th | 38 | 11 | 10 | 17 | 31 | 42 | −11 | 28.95 |
| Campeonato Paraense | 1 March 2021 | 15 May 2021 | Group stage | 3rd | 13 | 9 | 4 | 0 | 27 | 12 | +15 | 69.23 |
| Copa Verde | 19 October 2021 | 11 December 2021 | Round of 16 | Winners | 7 | 3 | 4 | 0 | 17 | 3 | +14 | 42.86 |
| Copa do Brasil | 17 March 2021 | 10 June 2021 | First round | Third round | 4 | 1 | 1 | 2 | 4 | 5 | −1 | 25.00 |
| Total | | | | | 62 | 24 | 19 | 19 | 79 | 62 | +17 | 38.71 |

Source: Competitions

=== Campeonato Brasileiro Série B ===
Win Draw Loss

| Pos | Team | Pld | W | D | L | GF | GA | GD | Pts | Promotion or relegation |
|---|---|---|---|---|---|---|---|---|---|---|
| 15 | Sampaio Corrêa | 38 | 12 | 11 | 15 | 41 | 42 | −1 | 47 | |
| 16 | Londrina | 38 | 11 | 11 | 16 | 31 | 41 | −10 | 44 | |
| 17 | Remo (R) | 38 | 11 | 10 | 17 | 31 | 42 | −11 | 43 | Relegation to 2022 Campeonato Brasileiro Série C |
| 18 | Vitória (R) | 38 | 8 | 16 | 14 | 31 | 32 | −1 | 40 | Relegation to 2022 Campeonato Brasileiro Série C |
| 19 | Confiança (R) | 38 | 9 | 10 | 19 | 35 | 48 | −13 | 37 | Relegation to 2022 Campeonato Brasileiro Série C |

Source: CBF
Rules for classification: 1) points; 2) wins; 3) goal difference; 4) goals scored; 5) head-to-head results (only between 2 teams); 6) fewest red cards; 7) fewest yellow cards; 8) drawing of lots.
(R) Relegated

==== Matches ====
| 29 May 2021 1 | CRB | 2–2 | Remo | Maceió |
| 16:00 UTC−3 | Hyuri 27'; Diego Torres (yellow card) 45', (goal) 88'; Guilherme Romão (yellow card) 67'; Marthã (yellow card) 89'; Calyson (yellow card) 90+5' | Report | Lucas Siqueira 11', 22', (yellow card) 33'; Jefferson (yellow card) 62'; Marlon (yellow card) 90+1' | Stadium: Estádio Rei Pelé; Attendance: 0 Referee: Tiago Nascimento dos Santos |

| 5 June 2021 2 | Remo | 1–0 | Brasil de Pelotas | Belém |
| 19:00 UTC−3 | Renan Gorne 26'; Anderson Uchôa (yellow card) 32'; Romércio (yellow card) 66' | Report | Artur (yellow card) 57'; Júnior Viçosa (yellow card) 66' | Stadium: Baenão; Attendance: 0 Referee: Ricarle Gustavo Gonçalves Batista |

| 13 June 2021 3 | Botafogo | 3–0 | Remo | Volta Redonda |
| 16:00 UTC−3 | Chay 13'; Guilherme Santos (yellow card) 23'; Rafael Navarro 58'; Gilvan (yellow card) 62'; Pedro Castro 64' | Report | Anderson Uchôa (yellow card) 31'; Rafael Jansen (yellow card) 50' | Stadium: Estádio Raulino de Oliveira; Attendance: 0 Referee: Alisson Sidnei Furtado |

| 16 June 2021 4 | Remo | 0–0 | Vitória | Belém |
| 16:00 UTC−3 | Anderson Uchôa (yellow card) 32'; Rafael Jansen (yellow card) 80' | Report | | Stadium: Baenão; Attendance: 0 Referee: Felipe da Silva Gonçalves Paludo |

| 22 June 2021 5 | Remo | 0–0 | Guarani | Belém |
| 21:30 UTC−3 | Igor Fernandes (yellow card) 76'; Felipe Gedoz (yellow card) 90'; Dioguinho (red card) 90+4' | Report | Thales (yellow card) 52'; Diogo Mateus (yellow card) 90+3'; Bidu (yellow card) 90+4' | Stadium: Baenão; Attendance: 0 Referee: Antônio Magno Lima Cordeiro |

| 26 June 2021 6 | Náutico | 1–1 | Remo | Recife |
| 21:00 UTC−3 | Camutanga (yellow card) 42'; Guillermo Paiva 88' | Report | Felipe Gedoz 26'; Rafinha (yellow card) 45+1'; Vinícius (yellow card) 53'; Edson Cariús (yellow card) 79' | Stadium: Estádio dos Aflitos; Attendance: 0 Referee: André Luiz de Freitas Castro |

| 29 June 2021 7 | Remo | 0–2 | Sampaio Corrêa | Belém |
| 21:30 UTC−3 | Dioguinho (yellow card) 43'; Felipe Gedoz (yellow card) 71' | Report | Eloir (yellow card) 44'; Jefinho 76' (pen.), (yellow card) 90+4'; Luis Gustavo (yellow card) 84'; Paulo Sérgio (yellow card) 85'; Romarinho 90' | Stadium: Baenão; Attendance: 0 Referee: Diego da Silva Castro |

| 2 July 2021 8 | Coritiba | 2–1 | Remo | Curitiba |
| 19:00 UTC−3 | Matheus Sales (yellow card) 39'; Léo Gamalho 56', 74' | Report | Erick Flores 57'; Anderson Uchôa (yellow card) 62'; Tiago Miranda (yellow card) 66'; Thiago Ennes (yellow card) 80'; Romércio (yellow card) 80' | Stadium: Estádio Couto Pereira; Attendance: 0 Referee: Adriano Barros Carneiro |

| 8 July 2021 9 | Remo | 0–1 | Vila Nova | Belém |
| 21:00 UTC−3 | Anderson Uchôa (yellow card) 24'; Erick Flores (yellow card) 30'; Romércio (yellow card) 90+1' | Report | Dudu Pacheco (yellow card) 47'; Deivid (yellow card) 51'; Rafael Donato 80' | Stadium: Baenão; Attendance: 0 Referee: Felipe da Silva Gonçalves Paludo |

| 14 July 2021 10 | Remo | 2–1 | Brusque | Belém |
| 21:30 UTC−3 | Erick Flores (yellow card) 27'; Felipe Gedoz 78'; Marcos Júnior 82' | Report | João Carlos (yellow card) 29'; Rodolfo Potiguar (yellow card) 33'; Zé Mateus (yellow card) 41'; Edu (yellow card) 59'; Thiago Alagoano (yellow card) 59'; Rafael Jansen 60' (o.g.) | Stadium: Baenão; Attendance: 0 Referee: Diego Pombo Lopez |

| 17 July 2021 11 | Ponte Preta | 1–2 | Remo | Campinas |
| 18:30 UTC−3 | Richard (yellow card) 27'; Dawhan 81' (pen.) | Report | Felipe Gedoz 9', 66'; Victor Andrade (yellow card) 33' | Stadium: Estádio Moisés Lucarelli; Attendance: 0 Referee: José Ricardo Vasconcellos Laranjeira |

| 20 July 2021 12 | Remo | 1–0 | Cruzeiro | Belém |
| 19:00 UTC−3 | Victor Andrade (yellow card) 21', (goal) 22'; Igor Fernandes (yellow card) 43' | Report | Rafael Sóbis (yellow card) 34'; Matheus Barbosa (yellow card) 41' (yellow-red card) 69' | Stadium: Baenão; Attendance: 0 Referee: Daniel Nobre Bins |

| 23 July 2021 13 | Londrina | 1–0 | Remo | Londrina |
| 16:00 UTC−3 | Lucas Lourenço (yellow card) 69'; Gegê 74'; Júnior Pirambú (yellow card) 90+2' | Report | Wallace (yellow card) 72'; Renan Gorne (yellow card) 77'; Pingo (yellow card) 83'; Kevem (yellow card) 90+4' | Stadium: Estádio do Café; Attendance: 0 Referee: Marcelo de Lima Henrique |

| 28 July 2021 14 | Avaí | 1–0 | Remo | Florianópolis |
| 19:00 UTC−3 | Diego Renan (yellow card) 45'; Bruno Silva (yellow card) 48'; Júnior Dutra 80' (pen.); Renato (yellow card) 86'; André (yellow card) 90+2' | Report | Romércio (yellow card) 55'; Dioguinho (yellow card) 60'; Wellington Silva (yellow card) 90+3' | Stadium: Estádio da Ressacada; Attendance: 0 Referee: Emerson Ricardo de Almeida Andrade |
Note: The match was postponed due to heavy rains in Florianópolis on the day it was originally played. It was rescheduled to 28 July.

| 1 August 2021 15 | Remo | 1–0 | CSA | Belém |
| 18:15 UTC−3 | Renan Gorne 8'; Anderson Uchôa (yellow card) 35'; Victor Andrade (yellow card) 45'; Erick Flores (yellow card) 46'; Thiago Ennes (yellow card) 59'; Matheus Oliveira (yellow card) 64' | Report | Aylon (yellow card) 19'; Ernandes (yellow card) 20'; Yuri Lima (yellow card) 90+1' | Stadium: Baenão; Attendance: 0 Referee: Alisson Sidnei Furtado |

| 6 August 2021 16 | Remo | 0–1 | Operário Ferroviário | Belém |
| 16:00 UTC−3 | Pingo (yellow card) 45+3'; Marcos Júnior (yellow card) 89'; Kevem (yellow card) 90+3' | Report | Rafael Chorão (red card) 4'; Fábio Alemão (yellow card) 49'; Thomaz 65'; Simão (yellow card) 67'; Cleyton (yellow card) 90+4' | Stadium: Baenão; Attendance: 0 Referee: Dyorgines José Padovani de Andrade |

| 10 August 2021 17 | Goiás | 1–1 | Remo | Goiânia |
| 21:30 UTC−3 | Vinícius Lopes (yellow card) 27'; David Duarte (yellow card) 44'; Breno (yellow card) 53'; Nicolas 62'; Dadá Belmonte (red card) 89' | Report | Felipe Gedoz (yellow card) 53'; Rafinha (yellow card) 78'; Renan Gorne 83' (pen.) | Stadium: Estádio da Serrinha; Attendance: 0 Referee: Paulo César Zanovelli da Silva |

| 13 August 2021 18 | Remo | 2–1 | Vasco da Gama | Belém |
| 21:30 UTC−3 | Renan Gorne 14'; Romércio 26'; Victor Andrade (yellow card) 88'; Pingo (yellow card) 90+5' | Report | Zeca (yellow card) 11'; Sarrafiore 31'; Matheus Nunes (yellow card) 64'; Vanderlei (red card) 66' | Stadium: Baenão; Attendance: 0 Referee: Vinícius Gonçalves Dias Araújo |

| 17 August 2021 19 | Confiança | 1–2 | Remo | Aracaju |
| 19:00 UTC−3 | Willians Santana (yellow card) 11'; Luidy 36'; Gustavo Ramos (yellow card) 79'; Bareiro (yellow card) 87' | Report | Marcelinho 15' (o.g.); Victor Andrade (yellow card) 30', (goal) 90+4'; Thiago Ennes (yellow card) 31'; Igor Fernandes (yellow card) 50'; Anderson Uchôa (yellow card) 86' | Stadium: Batistão; Attendance: 0 Referee: Rodrigo José Pereira de Lima |

| 21 August 2021 20 | Remo | 1–2 | CRB | Belém |
| 21:00 UTC−3 | Warley (yellow card) 19'; Marlon (yellow card) 57'; Jefferson 81' | Report | Renan Bressan 59' (pen.), 65' (pen.); Reginaldo (yellow card) 87'; Ewandro (yellow card) 90+8' | Stadium: Baenão; Attendance: 0 Referee: Thiago Luís Scarascati |

| 27 August 2021 21 | Brasil de Pelotas | 1–1 | Remo | Pelotas |
| 19:00 UTC−3 | Erison 29'; Rildo (yellow card) 45+4' (yellow-red card) 66'; Kevin (yellow card) 60'; Vidal (yellow card) 90+7' | Report | Warley (yellow card) 20'; Lucas Tocantins 38'; Kevem (yellow card) 59'; Igor Fernandes (yellow card) 62'; Renan Gorne (red card) 90+4' | Stadium: Estádio Bento Freitas; Attendance: 0 Referee: Grazianni Maciel Rocha |

| 4 September 2021 22 | Remo | 0–1 | Botafogo | Belém |
| 19:30 UTC−3 | Felipe Gedoz (yellow card) 40'; Victor Andrade (yellow card) 74'; Fredson (yellow card) 85' | Report | Rafael Moura (yellow card) 43'; Warley 64'; Diego Loureiro (yellow card) 72'; Romildo (yellow card) 90+6' | Stadium: Baenão; Attendance: 0 Referee: Wilton Sampaio |

| 10 September 2021 23 | Vitória | 1–2 | Remo | Salvador |
| 19:00 UTC−3 | Marcinho 11', (yellow card) 49'; Mateus Moraes (yellow card) 74'; Wallace (yellow card) 90+3'; Caíque (red card) 90+7'; Samuel (yellow card) 90+10' | Report | Matheus Oliveira (yellow card) 45'; Marcos Júnior 61', (yellow card) 84'; Lucas Tocantins 89' | Stadium: Barradão; Attendance: 0 Referee: Felipe Fernandes de Lima |

| 16 September 2021 24 | Remo | 2–1 | Avaí | Belém |
| 21:30 UTC−3 | Marcos Júnior (yellow card) 41'; Victor Andrade 44', (red card) 65'; Alemão 71' (o.g.) | Report | Alemão (yellow card) 13'; Edílson (yellow card) 35' (yellow-red card) 76', (goal) 59'; Bruno Silva (yellow card) 75'; João Lucas (yellow card) 86' | Stadium: Baenão; Attendance: 0 Referee: José Mendonça da Silva Júnior |

| 21 September 2021 25 | Guarani | 2–0 | Remo | Campinas |
| 16:00 UTC−3 | Ronaldo Alves (yellow card) 9'; Júlio César 17'; Bruno Sávio 43'; Thales (yellow card) 66' | Report | Matheus Oliveira (yellow card) 16'; Romércio (yellow card) 72' | Stadium: Estádio Brinco de Ouro; Attendance: 0 Referee: Paulo Henrique Schleich Vollkopf |

| 24 September 2021 26 | Remo | 1–0 | Náutico | Belém |
| 19:00 UTC−3 | Wellington Silva (yellow card) 16'; Lucas Siqueira (yellow card) 49'; Jefferson 90+7', (yellow card) 90+7' | Report | Carlão (yellow card) 26' (yellow-red card) 90' | Stadium: Baenão; Attendance: 1,699; Referee: Léo Simão Holanda |

| 30 September 2021 27 | Sampaio Corrêa | 1–1 | Remo | São Luís |
| 21:30 UTC−3 | Léo Artur 12'; Alyson (yellow card) 45'; Allan Godói (yellow card) 49'; Eloir (yellow card) 51'; Márcio Araújo (yellow card) 77' | Report | Thiago Ennes (yellow card) 19'; Rafael Jansen (yellow card) 57'; Victor Andrade (red card) 63'; Lucas Tocantins 88' | Stadium: Castelão; Attendance: 1,770; Referee: Rafael Martins de Sá |

| 4 October 2021 28 | Remo | 0–0 | Coritiba | Belém |
| 20:00 UTC−3 | Marlon (yellow card) 56'; Pingo (yellow card) 73' | Report | Rafinha (yellow card) 45+1'; Guilherme Biro (yellow card) 62'; Val (yellow card) 80' | Stadium: Baenão; Attendance: 1,908; Referee: Zandick Gondim Alves Júnior |

| 8 October 2021 29 | Vila Nova | 1–0 | Remo | Goiânia |
| 19:00 UTC−3 | Alesson 13'; Bruno Collaço (yellow card) 33' (yellow-red card) 42'; Clayton (yellow card) 45+4'; Pedro Júnior (yellow card) 86'; Dudu Pacheco (yellow card) 87'; Georgemy (yellow card) 89' | Report | Marcos Júnior (yellow card) 67'; Matheus Oliveira (yellow card) 90+3' | Stadium: Estádio Onésio Brasileiro Alvarenga; Attendance: 1,804; Referee: Flávio Rodrigues de Souza |

| 15 October 2021 30 | Brusque | 3–1 | Remo | Brusque |
| 16:00 UTC−3 | Zé Mateus (yellow card) 38'; João Carlos (yellow card) 48'; Luizão 55'; Thiago Alagoano 57'; Edu (yellow card) 88', (goal) 90+3'; Sandro (yellow card) 89' | Report | Pingo 13'; Marcos Júnior (yellow card) 22'; Marlon (yellow card) 59' | Stadium: Estádio Augusto Bauer; Attendance: 276; Referee: Vinícius Gomes do Amaral |

| 24 October 2021 31 | Remo | 0–1 | Ponte Preta | Belém |
| 16:00 UTC−3 | Anderson Uchôa (yellow card) 69'; Rafael Jansen (yellow card) 72' | Report | Marcos Júnior 14'; Léo Naldi (yellow card) 16'; Richard (yellow card) 41'; Yago (yellow card) 62'; Ivan (yellow card) 84'; Fábio Sanches (yellow card) 90+2' | Stadium: Baenão; Attendance: 6,103; Referee: Paulo César Zanovelli da Silva |

| 28 October 2021 32 | Cruzeiro | 1–3 | Remo | Belo Horizonte |
| 21:30 UTC−3 | Eduardo Brock 45'; Wellington Nem (yellow card) 59'; Vitor Leque (red card) 90+5' | Report | Anderson Uchôa (yellow card) 8', (goal) 39'; Raimar (yellow card) 83'; Matheus Oliveira (yellow card) 85'; Jefferson 87'; Ronald 90+3' | Stadium: Arena Independência; Attendance: 2,792; Referee: Douglas Schwengber da Silva |

| 2 November 2021 33 | Remo | 0–1 | Londrina | Belém |
| 19:00 UTC−3 | Matheus Oliveira (yellow card) 90+4'; Raimar (yellow card) 90+6' | Report | Zeca 28' | Stadium: Baenão; Attendance: 6,600; Referee: Bruno Arleu de Araújo |

| 5 November 2021 34 | CSA | 2–0 | Remo | Maceió |
| 17:00 UTC−3 | Marco Túlio 27'; Reinaldo (yellow card) 71'; Dellatorre 74' | Report | Pingo (yellow card) 67'; Anderson Uchôa (yellow card) 71'; Victor Andrade (yellow card) 85' | Stadium: Estádio Rei Pelé; Attendance: 4,732; Referee: Caio Max Augusto Vieira |

| 9 November 2021 35 | Operário Ferroviário | 2–1 | Remo | Ponta Grossa |
| 19:00 UTC−3 | Fábio Alemão (yellow card) 62'; Felipe Garcia 62'; Reniê (yellow card) 86'; Schumacher 89'; Odivan (yellow card) 90+3' | Report | Renan Gorne 90+5' (pen.); Jefferson (yellow card) 90+6' | Stadium: Estádio Germano Krüger; Attendance: 3,544; Referee: Wagner do Nascimento Magalhães |

| 15 November 2021 36 | Remo | 0–1 | Goiás | Belém |
| 20:00 UTC−3 | Victor Andrade (yellow card) 34'; Anderson Uchôa (yellow card) 42'; Felipe Gedoz (yellow card) 64' | Report | Caio Vinícius (yellow card) 30'; Alef Manga (yellow card) 40', (goal) 68' | Stadium: Baenão; Attendance: 6,700; Referee: Douglas Schwengber da Silva |

| 19 November 2021 37 | Vasco da Gama | 2–2 | Remo | Rio de Janeiro |
| 19:00 UTC−3 | Riquelme (yellow card) 36'; Léo Matos 41', (yellow card) 78'; Galarza 81' | Report | Neto Pessoa 30'; Victor Andrade (yellow card) 34' (yellow-red card) 69'; Lucas Siqueira 38' | Stadium: Estádio São Januário; Attendance: 1,024; Referee: Rodrigo Batista Raposo |

| 28 November 2021 38 | Remo | 0–0 | Confiança | Belém |
| 16:00 UTC−3 | Romércio (yellow card) 90+4' | Report | Bocão (yellow card) 58'; Álvaro (yellow card) 84' | Stadium: Baenão; Attendance: 6,700; Referee: Raphael Claus |

=== Campeonato Paraense ===
Win Draw Loss

==== Group stage ====
| Pos | Team | Pld | W | D | L | GF | GA | GD | Pts | Qualification or relegation |
|---|---|---|---|---|---|---|---|---|---|---|
| 1 | Remo (A) | 8 | 6 | 2 | 0 | 18 | 9 | +9 | 20 | Advance to the Final stage |
| 2 | Tuna Luso (A) | 8 | 3 | 3 | 2 | 20 | 13 | +7 | 12 | Advance to the Final stage |
| 3 | Tapajós | 8 | 1 | 4 | 3 | 7 | 9 | −2 | 7 | |
| 4 | Carajás (R) | 8 | 1 | 2 | 5 | 5 | 11 | −6 | 5 | 2022 Paraense 2nd Division |

Source: Globo Esporte
(A) Advance to a further round; (R) Relegated

===== Matches =====
| 1 March 2021 1 | Remo | 4–1 | Gavião Kyikatejê | Belém |
| 19:00 UTC−3 | Wallace 31'; Renan Gorne 34', 54'; Dioguinho 37'; Pepê (yellow card) 90' | Report | Kaká (yellow card) 34'; Thiago Bala 46'; Kaio (yellow card) 50'; Gabriel (yellow card) 59' | Stadium: Baenão; Attendance: 0 Referee: Gustavo Ramos Melo |

| 5 March 2021 2 | Bragantino | 2–3 | Remo | Bragança |
| 15:00 UTC−3 | Túlio 3'; Charlinho (yellow card) 9'; George (yellow card) 14'; Cris Maranhense 90+4' | Report | Renan Gorne 20'; Rafael Jansen (yellow card) 43'; Dioguinho 59'; Fredson 65', (yellow card) 90+3' | Stadium: Diogão; Attendance: 0 Referee: Marco José Soares de Almeida |

| 11 March 2021 3 | Remo | 1–0 | Itupiranga | Belém |
| 17:00 UTC−3 | Dioguinho 52'; Renan Gorne (yellow card) 80' | Report | Dida (yellow card) 33'; Hércules (yellow card) 90+7' | Stadium: Baenão; Attendance: 0 Referee: Joelson Nazareno Ferreira Cardoso |

| 4 April 2021 4 | Paysandu | 2–4 | Remo | Belém |
| 17:00 UTC−3 | Nicolas 5', 76'; Perema (yellow card) 25'; Ruy (yellow card) 89' | Report | Dioguinho 4'; Lucas Tocantins 12'; Lucas Siqueira 18'; Felipe Gedoz (yellow card) 20'; Rafael Jansen 54'; Mimica (yellow card) 55'; Marlon (yellow card) 77'; Vinícius (yellow card) 90+4' | Stadium: Estádio da Curuzu; Attendance: 0 Referee: Marco José Soares de Almeida |
Note: Match originally scheduled for 21 March 2021, but postponed on 13 March due to concerns over the COVID-19 pandemic in Brazil. It was rescheduled to 4 April.

| 8 April 2021 5 | Remo | 2–2 | Independente | Belém |
| 17:00 UTC−3 | Dioguinho 32', (yellow card) 40'; Felipe Gedoz 70' (pen.); Laílson (yellow card) 71' | Report | Danrlei 24'; Geílson (yellow card) 34'; Dudu (yellow card) 60'; Rafael Vioto (yellow card) 68'; Yuri 73'; Dida (yellow card) 90+3' | Stadium: Baenão; Attendance: 0 Referee: Joelson Silva dos Santos |
Note: Match originally scheduled for 25 March 2021, but postponed on 13 March due to concerns over the COVID-19 pandemic in Brazil. It was rescheduled to 8 April.

| 18 April 2021 6 | Águia de Marabá | 1–1 | Remo | Marabá |
| 16:00 UTC−3 | Dé 15', (yellow card) 60' | Report | Dioguinho 37', (yellow card) 61'; Anderson Uchôa (yellow card) 45+3' | Stadium: Estádio Municipal Zinho de Oliveira; Attendance: 0 Referee: Djonaltan Costa de Araújo |

| 21 April 2021 7 | Remo | 2–1 | Castanhal | Belém |
| 17:00 UTC−3 | Renan Gorne 14', (yellow card) 21' (yellow-red card) 37'; Marlon 20'; Wellington Silva (yellow card) 49'; Rafael Jansen (yellow card) 70'; Anderson Uchôa (yellow card) 77' | Report | Gui Campana 16', (yellow card) 49'; Leandro Cabecinha (yellow card) 40'; Cléberson (yellow card) 57'; Lucas Santos (yellow card) 67'; Fidélis (yellow card) 85'; Thárcio (yellow card) 90+4' | Stadium: Baenão; Attendance: 0 Referee: Andrey da Silva e Silva |

| 28 April 2021 8 | Paragominas | 0–1 | Remo | Paragominas |
| 15:30 UTC−3 | Buiú (yellow card) 80' | Report | Felipe Gedoz 49' | Stadium: Estádio Arena do Município Verde; Attendance: 0 Referee: Marco José Soares de Almeida |

==== Final stage ====
===== Quarter-finals =====
| 1 May 2021 First leg | Águia de Marabá | 1–3 | Remo | Marabá |
| 16:00 UTC−3 | Matheus Rosa (yellow card) 7'; Gilmar (yellow card) 18' (yellow-red card) 71'; Bruno Limão (yellow card) 42'; Balão Marabá (yellow card) 61'; Echeverría 71'; Veraldo (yellow card) 75'; Alanderson (yellow card) 89'; Guigui (yellow card) 90'; Souza (yellow card) 90+4'; Romarinho (yellow card) 90+8', (red card) 90+10' | Report | Lucas Tocantins 1'; Felipe Gedoz 31', (yellow card) 67'; Erick Flores (yellow card) 45+2'; Rafael Jansen (yellow card) 60'; Lucas Siqueira (yellow card) 67'; Edson Cariús 73'; Fredson (yellow card) 79'; Thiago Ennes (yellow card) 90+1' | Stadium: Estádio Municipal Zinho de Oliveira; Attendance: 0 Referee: Joelson Nazareno Ferreira Cardoso |

| 4 May 2021 Second leg | Remo | 1–0 (4–1 agg.) | Águia de Marabá | Belém |
| 19:00 UTC−3 | Wellington Silva (yellow card) 38'; Lucas Siqueira (yellow card) 41'; Edson Cariús 77', (yellow card) 85' | Report | Matheus Rosa (yellow card) 24'; Dé (yellow card) 53'; Júnior Gaúcho (yellow card) 76' | Stadium: Baenão; Attendance: 0 Referee: Rodolpho Toski Marques |

===== Semi-finals =====
| 9 May 2021 First leg | Tuna Luso | 1–1 | Remo | Belém |
| 10:00 UTC−3 | Léo Rosa 34' (pen.); Arthur (yellow card) 45+3'; Alysson (yellow card) 89' | Report | Anderson Uchôa 20'; Felipe Gedoz (yellow card) 40'; Gabriel Lima (yellow card) 85' | Stadium: Estádio Francisco Vasques; Attendance: 0 Referee: Joelson Silva dos Santos |

| 12 May 2021 Second leg | Remo | 1–1 (2–2 agg.) (5–6 p) | Tuna Luso | Belém |
| 19:15 UTC−3 | Dedé 11' (o.g.); Edson Cariús (yellow card) 23'; Marlon (yellow card) 84' | Report | Léo Rosa (yellow card) 28'; Felipe (yellow card) 54'; Wellington Pará (yellow card) 65'; Dedé 83' | Stadium: Baenão; Attendance: 0 Referee: Djonaltan Costa de Araújo |
| | Penalties |
| | Renan Gorne (penalty scored); Renan Oliveira (penalty missed); Marlon (penalty scored); Vinícius Kiss (penalty scored); Felipe Gedoz (penalty scored); Rafael Jansen (penalty scored); Erick Flores (penalty missed) | | (penalty missed) Léo Rosa; (penalty scored) Renan; (penalty scored) Kauê; (penalty scored) Lukinha; (penalty scored) Paulo Rangel; (penalty scored) Alexandre Pinho; (penalty scored) Lineker |

===== Third place play-off =====
| 15 May 2021 | Remo | 3–0 | Castanhal | Belém |
| 17:00 UTC−3 | Lucas Siqueira 33'; Anderson Uchôa (yellow card) 36'; Fredson 46'; Felipe Gedoz 53' | Report | Magnum (yellow card) 37'; Cléberson (yellow card) 52'; Thárcio (yellow card) 89' | Stadium: Baenão; Attendance: 0 Referee: Gustavo Ramos Melo |

=== Copa Verde ===
Win Draw Loss

==== Round of 16 ====
| 19 October 2021 | Remo | 9–0 | Galvez | Belém |
| 20:30 UTC−3 | Neto Pessoa 9', 40', 45+2'; Edu 49'; Rafinha 65'; Wallace 71' (pen.), 72', 82'; Neto Moura 76' | Report | Matheus (yellow card) 37'; Daniel (yellow card) 70' | Stadium: Baenão; Attendance: 1,381; Referee: Rafael Martins Diniz |

==== Quarter-finals ====
| 12 November 2021 First leg | Manaus | 1–1 | Remo | Manaus |
| 17:30 UTC−3 | Douglas Lima (yellow card) 5'; Jackie Chan (yellow card) 65'; Derlan (yellow card) 71'; Rafhael Lucas 88' | Report | Renan Gorne (yellow card) 2'; Neto Moura (yellow card) 35'; Wellington Silva (yellow card) 45'; Marlon 81'; Erick Flores (yellow card) 90+2' | Stadium: Arena da Amazônia; Attendance: 1,123; Referee: André Rodrigo Rocha |

| 24 November 2021 Second leg | Remo | 3–0 (4–1 agg.) | Manaus | Belém |
| 20:30 UTC−3 | Neto Pessoa 33', 42'; Matheus Oliveira (yellow card) 34'; Erick Flores 74'; Neto Moura (yellow card) 79'; Thiago Ennes (yellow card) 87' | Report | Luís Fernando (yellow card) 45+2'; Julio Rusch (yellow card) 76' | Stadium: Baenão; Attendance: 4,875; Referee: Dyorgines José Padovani de Andrade |

==== Semi-finals ====
| 1 December 2021 First leg | Paysandu | 2–2 | Remo | Belém |
| 20:00 UTC−3 | José Aldo 13'; Yan (yellow card) 17'; Laércio 26', (yellow card) 45+1'; Victor Sallinas (yellow card) 28'; Leandro Silva (yellow card) 62'; Jhonnatan (yellow card) 69' | Report | Neto Moura (yellow card) 30'; Jefferson (yellow card) 40'; Neto Pessoa 48', 55' (pen.); Fredson (yellow card) 50'; Anderson Uchôa (yellow card) 65', (red card) 69' | Stadium: Estádio da Curuzu; Attendance: 8,810; Referee: Jefferson Ferreira de Moraes |

| 4 December 2021 Second leg | Remo | 2–0 (4–2 agg.) | Paysandu | Belém |
| 17:00 UTC−3 | Neto Pessoa 17', 90+5' (pen.); Felipe Gedoz (yellow card) 25'; Erick Flores (yellow card) 34'; Fredson (yellow card) 59'; Raimar (red card) 90+4' | Report | Ratinho (yellow card) 28'; José Aldo (yellow card) 67'; Victor Sallinas (yellow card) 90+1'; Leandro Silva (red card) 90+4' | Stadium: Baenão; Attendance: 6,700; Referee: André Luiz de Freitas Castro |

==== Finals ====
| 8 December 2021 First leg | Vila Nova | 0–0 | Remo | Goiânia |
| 20:00 UTC−3 | Alesson (yellow card) 36'; Moacir (yellow card) 85' | Report | Lucas Siqueira (yellow card) 29' | Stadium: Estádio Onésio Brasileiro Alvarenga; Attendance: 8,120; Referee: Rodrigo Batista Raposo |

| 11 December 2021 Second leg | Remo | 0–0 (0–0 agg.) (4–2 p) | Vila Nova | Belém |
| 17:00 UTC−3 | Lucas Siqueira (yellow card) 60'; Tiago Mafra (yellow card) 78'; Paulinho Curuá (yellow card) 90+2' | | Clayton (yellow card) 1'; Éder Monteiro (yellow card) 76'; André Krobel (yellow card) 90+7' | Stadium: Baenão; Attendance: 12,702; Referee: Dyorgines José Padovani de Andrade |
| | Penalties |
| | Neto Pessoa (penalty scored); Raimar (penalty scored); Marlon (penalty scored); Fredson (penalty scored) | | (penalty scored) Clayton; (penalty scored) Rafael Donato; (penalty missed) André Krobel; (penalty missed) Johnatan Cardoso |

=== Copa do Brasil ===
Win Draw Loss

==== First round ====
| 17 March 2021 | Esportivo | 0–2 | Remo | Bento Gonçalves |
| 20:00 UTC−3 | Daniel Cruz (yellow card) 27'; Mateus Santana (yellow card) 37' (yellow-red card) 86'; Mateus Norton (yellow card) 41' (yellow-red card) 56'; Wesley Pacheco (yellow card) 45'; Rennan Oliveira (yellow card) 50'; Vinícius Martins (yellow card) 83'; Lucas Hulk (yellow card) 90+2' | Report | Felipe Gedoz 20'; Jéferson Lima (yellow card) 82'; Rafael Jansen (yellow card) 83'; Lucas Tocantins 85' | Stadium: Estádio Parque Esportivo Montanha dos Vinhedos; Attendance: 0 Referee: Alexandre Vargas Tavares de Jesus |

==== Second round ====
| 13 April 2021 | CSA | 1–1 (5–6 p) | Remo | Maceió |
| 21:30 UTC−3 | Dellatorre 35'; Matheus Piauí (yellow card) 43'; Gabriel (yellow card) 54'; Geovane (red card) 81' | Report | Rafael Jansen (yellow card) 45+1'; Anderson Uchôa 73', (yellow card) 89'; Renan Oliveira (yellow card) 89' | Stadium: Estádio Rei Pelé; Attendance: 0 Referee: Jean Pierre Gonçalves Lima |
| | Penalties |
| | Iury (penalty scored); Bruno Mota (penalty scored); Gabriel (penalty scored); Silas (penalty scored); Silvinho (penalty scored); Vítor Costa (penalty missed) | | (penalty scored) Edson Cariús; (penalty scored) Renan Oliveira; (penalty scored) Marlon; (penalty scored) Rafael Jansen; (penalty scored) Felipe Gedoz; (penalty scored) Wallace |

==== Third round ====
| 2 June 2021 First leg | Remo | 0–2 | Atlético Mineiro | Belém |
| 19:00 UTC−3 | Marlon (yellow card) 87' | Report | Hyoran 14'; Fernández 45+1'; Dodô (yellow card) 90+3' | Stadium: Baenão; Attendance: 0 Referee: Antônio Dib Moraes de Sousa |

| 10 June 2021 Second leg | Atlético Mineiro | 2–1 (4–1 agg.) | Remo | Belo Horizonte |
| 19:00 UTC−3 | Réver 9'; Hulk 51' (pen.) | Report | Romércio 45' | Stadium: Mineirão; Attendance: 0 Referee: Jefferson Ferreira de Moraes |
