= 2022 Copa Verde finals =

- Event: 2022 Copa Verde
Paysandu	Vila Nova
(Pará)	(Goiás)
1	1
- on aggregate Paysandu won 4–3 on penalties

First leg
Paysandu	Vila Nova
0	0
- Date: 15 November 2022
- Venue: Estádio da Curuzu, Belém
- Referee: Paulo Henrique de Melo Salmazio
- Attendance: 11,384

Second leg
Vila Nova	Paysandu
1	1
- Date: 19 November 2022
- Venue: Estádio Serra Dourada, Goiânia
- Referee: Paulo Henrique Schleich Vollkopf
- Attendance: 24,591

The 2022 Copa Verde finals was the final two-legged tie that decided the 2022 Copa Verde, the 9th season of the Copa Verde, Brazil's regional cup football tournament organised by the Brazilian Football Confederation.

The finals were contested in a two-legged home-and-away format between Paysandu, from Pará, and Vila Nova, from Goiás.

The first leg ended in a scoreless draw, while the second leg ended in a 1–1 draw, which meant the title was decided by a penalty shoot-out. Paysandu won 4–3 to claim their third Copa Verde title.

== Teams ==
Team	Previous finals appearances (bold indicates winners)
(Pará) Paysandu	5 (2014, **2016**, 2017, **2018**, 2019)
(Goiás) Vila Nova	1 (2021)

=== Road to the final ===
Note: In all scores below, the score of the finalist is given first.

(Pará) Paysandu			Round	(Goiás) Vila Nova		
Opponent	Venue	Score		Opponent	Venue	Score
Bye			First round	Bye		
(Acre (state)) Humaitá	Home	3–0	Round of 16	(Mato Grosso) CEOV	Home	2–1
(Tocantins) Tocantinópolis	Home	2–0	Quarter-finals	(Espírito Santo) Real Noroeste	Home	0–0 (3–2 p)
(Amazonas (Brazilian state)) São Raimundo (won 5–2 on aggregate)	Away	2–2	Semi-finals	(Federal District (Brazil)) Brasiliense (won 3–2 on aggregate)	Away	1–1
(Amazonas (Brazilian state)) São Raimundo (won 5–2 on aggregate)	Home	3–0	Semi-finals	(Federal District (Brazil)) Brasiliense (won 3–2 on aggregate)	Home	2–1

== Format ==
The finals were played on a home-and-away two-legged basis. If tied on aggregate, the penalty shoot-out was used to determine the winner.

== Matches ==
=== First leg ===
15 November 2022
18:30 BRT (UTC−3)

Paysandu (Pará)	0–0	(Goiás) Vila Nova
	Report

Estádio da Curuzu, Belém
Attendance: 11,384
Referee: Paulo Henrique de Melo Salmazio (Mato Grosso do Sul)

**Paysandu**	**Vila Nova**

GK	1	(Brazil) Thiago Coelho
DF	2	(Brazil) Leandro Silva	(yellow card) 13' (yellow-red card) 60'
DF	30	(Brazil) Genílson (c)
DF	31	(Brazil) Naylhor
DF	39	(Brazil) Patrick Brey
MF	29	(Brazil) Mikael
MF	16	(Brazil) João Vieira	(yellow card) 25'	(substituted off) 81'
MF	11	(Brazil) José Aldo		(substituted off) 68'
FW	10	(Brazil) Marlon
FW	25	(Brazil) Robinho		(substituted off) 81'
FW	9	(Brazil) Danrlei		(substituted off) 68'
Substitutes:
GK	40	(Brazil) Gabriel Bernard
DF	3	(Brazil) Lucas Costa
DF	22	(Brazil) Thiago Ennes		(substituted on) 81'
MF	5	(Brazil) Eric
MF	8	(Brazil) Ricardinho		(substituted on) 68'
MF	15	(Brazil) Jean Henrique
MF	17	(Brazil) Adílson
MF	19	(Brazil) Gabriel Davis		(substituted on) 68'
MF	20	(Brazil) Kauê
FW	36	(Brazil) Matheus Batista
FW	37	(Brazil) Roger
FW	38	(Brazil) Dioguinho		(substituted on) 81'
Coach:
(Brazil) Márcio Fernandes

GK	30	(Brazil) Tony
DF	2	(Brazil) Alex Silva	(yellow card) 90+4'
DF	5	(Brazil) Rafael Donato (c)
DF	14	(Brazil) Jordan
DF	13	(Brazil) Willian Formiga		(substituted off) 69'
MF	18	(Brazil) Ralf	(yellow card) 17'	(substituted off) 78'
MF	15	(Brazil) Sousa	(yellow card) 22'	(substituted off) 65'
MF	17	(Brazil) Wágner	(yellow card) 60'	(substituted off) 65'
FW	21	(Brazil) Diego Tavares	(yellow card) 90'
FW	11	(Brazil) Kaio Nunes
FW	9	(Brazil) Neto Pessoa		(substituted off) 46'
Substitutes:
GK	1	(Brazil) Georgemy
DF	3	(Brazil) Railan
DF	4	(Brazil) Alisson Cassiano
DF	6	(Brazil) Jefferson		(substituted on) 69'
MF	7	(Brazil) Matheuzinho		(substituted on) 65'
MF	20	(Brazil) Jean Martim		(substituted on) 65'
MF	22	(Brazil) Marlone		(substituted on) 78'
FW	19	(Brazil) Daniel Amorim		(substituted on) 46'
FW	23	(Brazil) Matheus Souza
Coach:
(Brazil) Allan Aal

Assistant referees:
Eduardo Gonçalves da Cruz (Mato Grosso do Sul)
Leandro dos Santos Ruberdo (Mato Grosso do Sul)
Fourth official:
Luiz Paulo de Moura Pinheiro (Mato Grosso)
Fifth official:
Acácio Menezes Leão (Pará)
Video assistant referee:
Wagner Reway (Paraíba)
Assistant video assistant referees:
Cleriston Clay Barreto Rios (Sergipe)
Hilton Moutinho Rodrigues (Rio de Janeiro)

=== Second leg ===
19 November 2022
19:00 BRT (UTC−3)

Vila Nova (Goiás)	1–1	(Pará) Paysandu
Matheuzinho 26'	Report	João Vieira 90+5'
Penalties
Wágner (penalty scored); Sousa (penalty missed); Alex Silva (penalty scored); Diego Tavares (penalty missed); Rafael Donato (penalty scored)	3–4	(penalty scored) Marlon; (penalty scored) Ricardinho; (penalty missed) Gabriel Davis; (penalty scored) João Vieira; (penalty scored) Patrick Brey

Estádio Serra Dourada, Goiânia
Attendance: 24,591
Referee: Paulo Henrique Schleich Vollkopf (Mato Grosso do Sul)

**Vila Nova**	**Paysandu**

GK	30	(Brazil) Tony
DF	2	(Brazil) Alex Silva
DF	5	(Brazil) Rafael Donato (c)
DF	14	(Brazil) Jordan
DF	13	(Brazil) Willian Formiga	(substituted off) 71'
MF	18	(Brazil) Ralf
MF	15	(Brazil) Sousa
MF	7	(Brazil) Matheuzinho	(substituted off) 78'
FW	21	(Brazil) Diego Tavares
FW	11	(Brazil) Kaio Nunes	(substituted off) 71'
FW	9	(Brazil) Neto Pessoa	(substituted off) 89'
Substitutes:
GK	1	(Brazil) Georgemy
DF	3	(Brazil) Railan
DF	4	(Brazil) Alisson Cassiano	(substituted on) 89'
DF	6	(Brazil) Jefferson	(substituted on) 71'
DF	16	(Brazil) Eduardo Doma
MF	8	(Brazil) Gabriel Domingos
MF	10	(Brazil) João Lucas
MF	17	(Brazil) Wágner	(substituted on) 78'
MF	20	(Brazil) Jean Martim
MF	22	(Brazil) Marlone
FW	19	(Brazil) Daniel Amorim
FW	23	(Brazil) Matheus Souza	(substituted on) 71'
Coach:
(Brazil) Allan Aal

GK	1	(Brazil) Thiago Coelho
DF	3	(Brazil) Lucas Costa	(yellow card) 9'	(substituted off) 46'
DF	30	(Brazil) Genílson (c)
DF	31	(Brazil) Naylhor
MF	22	(Brazil) Thiago Ennes		(substituted off) 46'
MF	39	(Brazil) Patrick Brey
MF	29	(Brazil) Mikael		(substituted off) 71'
MF	16	(Brazil) João Vieira
MF	11	(Brazil) José Aldo	(yellow card) 68'	(substituted off) 83'
FW	10	(Brazil) Marlon
FW	25	(Brazil) Robinho		(substituted off) 86'
Substitutes:
GK	40	(Brazil) Gabriel Bernard
MF	8	(Brazil) Ricardinho		(substituted on) 71'
MF	15	(Brazil) Jean Henrique
MF	19	(Brazil) Gabriel Davis	(yellow card) 57'	(substituted on) 46'
MF	20	(Brazil) Kauê
FW	9	(Brazil) Danrlei	(yellow card) 48'	(substituted on) 46'
FW	36	(Brazil) Matheus Batista		(substituted on) 86'
FW	37	(Brazil) Roger
FW	38	(Brazil) Dioguinho		(substituted on) 83'
Coach:
(Brazil) Márcio Fernandes

Assistant referees:
Marcos dos Santos Brito (Mato Grosso do Sul)
Marcelo Grando (Mato Grosso do Sul)
Fourth official:
Renan Novaes Insabralde (Mato Grosso do Sul)
Fifth official:
Cristhian Passos Sorence (Goiás)
Video assistant referee:
Rodrigo Guarizo Ferreira do Amaral (São Paulo)
Assistant video assistant referees:
Adriano de Assis Miranda (São Paulo)
José Henrique de Carvalho (São Paulo)

== See also ==
- 2023 Copa do Brasil
