= Daniel Cruz =

Daniel Cruz may refer to:

- Daniel Cruz (footballer, born 1981), Belgian football midfielder
- Daniel Cruz (footballer, born 2001), Brazilian football forward
- Daniel Cruz (footballer, born 1982), Brazilian football defender
- Daniel Cruz (footballer, born 1990), Brazilian football forward
- Daniel de la Cruz (born 2004), Ecuadorian footballer
- Danny Cruz (born 1990), American soccer player
