= Luís Gustavo =

Luís Gustavo may refer to:

- Luis Gustavo (actor) (1934–2021), Brazilian actor
- Luís Gustavo (footballer, born 1968), Brazilian former football midfielder
- Luis Gustavo (footballer, born 1989), Brazilian football defender
- Luís Gustavo Ledes (born 1992), Portuguese footballer

== See also ==
- Luiz Gustavo (disambiguation)
