= Laercio =

Laercio may refer to:

- Laércio Gomes Costa (born 1990), also known as Laércio Carreirinha or simply Laércio, Brazilian football striker
- Laercio Oliveira (born 1959), Brazilian politician
- Laércio (footballer, born 1998), Brazilian football midfielder Laércio da Silva Carvalho
- Laércio Soldá (born 1993), Brazilian football defender
