= Renan Oliveira =

Renan Oliveira may refer to:

- Renan Oliveira (footballer, born 1989), Brazilian footballer
- Renan Oliveira (footballer, born 1997), Brazilian footballer
