= Luiz Gustavo (disambiguation) =

Luiz Gustavo (born 1987), is a Brazilian football defensive midfielder currently at Fenerbahçe

Luiz Gustavo may also refer to:

- Luiz Gustavo (footballer, born 1972), full name Luiz Gustavo Silva de Aviz, Brazilian former football forward
- Luiz Gustavo (footballer, born 1994), full name Luiz Gustavo Tavares Conde, Brazilian football defender for Volta Redonda
- Luiz Gustavo (footballer, born 1999), full name Luiz Gustavo Benmuyal Reis, Brazilian football right-back for Sanjoanense
- Luiz Gustavo (footballer, born 2003), full name Luiz Gustavo da Silva Alves, Brazilian football centre-back for Atlético Goianiense
- Luiz Gustavo (footballer, born January 2006), full name Luiz Gustavo Lemos Carvalho, Brazilian football defensive midfielder for Corinthians
- Luiz Gustavo (footballer, born April 2006), full name Luiz Gustavo Marinho Ribeiro dos Santos, Brazilian football defender for Vasco da Gama

== See also ==
- Luís Gustavo (disambiguation)
