= Richard (footballer, born 1999) =

Brazilian footballer

Personal information
- Full name: Richard Alexandre Birkheun Rodrigues
- Date of birth: 11 October 1999 (age 27)
- Place of birth: Barão, Brazil
- Height: 1.76 m (5 ft 9 1/2 in)
- Position: Winger

Team information
- Current team: Chapecoense (on loan from CRB)
- Number: 77

Youth career
- Internacional

Senior career*
Years	Team	Apps	(Gls)
2018–2021	Internacional	1	(0)
2019	→ Vila Nova (loan)	5	(0)
2019–2020	→ Tondela (loan)	29	(2)
2020–2021	→ Belenenses SAD (loan)	10	(0)
2020–2021	→ Belenenses SAD B (loan)	2	(0)
2021	→ Botafogo-SP (loan)	8	(0)
2021	→ Ponte Preta (loan)	27	(0)
2022–	CRB	36	(2)
2023	→ Portuguesa (loan)	13	(2)
2023–	→ Chapecoense (loan)	5	(0)
- * Club domestic league appearances and goals as of 22:36, 9 May 2023 (UTC)

Richard Alexandre Birkheun Rodrigues (born 11 October 1999), simply known as Richard, is a Brazilian footballer who plays as a winger for Chapecoense, on loan from CRB.

== Career statistics ==
As of 17 March 2023.

Club	Season	League			State League		Cup		Continental		Other		Total	
Club	Season	Division	Apps	Goals	Apps	Goals	Apps	Goals	Apps	Goals	Apps	Goals	Apps	Goals
Internacional	2018	Série A	0	0	1 (Note: Appearance(s) in Campeonato Gaúcho)	0	0	0	—		—		1	0
Internacional	2019	Série A	0	0	0	0	0	0	—		—		0	0
Internacional	Total		0	0	1	0	0	0	—		—		1	0
Vila Nova (loan)	2019	Série B	5	0	—		—		—		—		5	0
Tondela (loan)	2019–20	Primeira Liga	28	2	—		0	0	—		1 (Note: Appearance(s) in Taça da Liga)	0	29	2
Belenenses SAD (loan)	2020–21	Primeira Liga	10	0	—		3	0	—		—		13	0
Belenenses SAD B (loan)	2020–21	Campeonato de Portugal	2	0	—		—		—		—		2	0
Botafogo-SP (loan)	2021	Série C	0	0	8 (Note: Appearance(s) in Campeonato Paulista)	0	—		—		—		8	0
Ponte Preta (loan)	2021	Série B	27	0	—		—		—		—		27	0
CRB	2022	Série B	26	2	10 (Note: Appearance(s) in Campeonato Alagoano)	0	1	0	—		8 (Note: Appearance(s) in Copa do Nordeste)	1	45	3
Portuguesa (loan)	2023	Paulista	—		13	2	—		—		—		13	2
Chapecoense (loan)	2023	Série B	5	0	—		—		—		—		5	0
Career total			103	2	32	2	4	0	0	0	8	1	148	5
