= Marcos Júnior (footballer, born 1995) =

Brazilian footballer

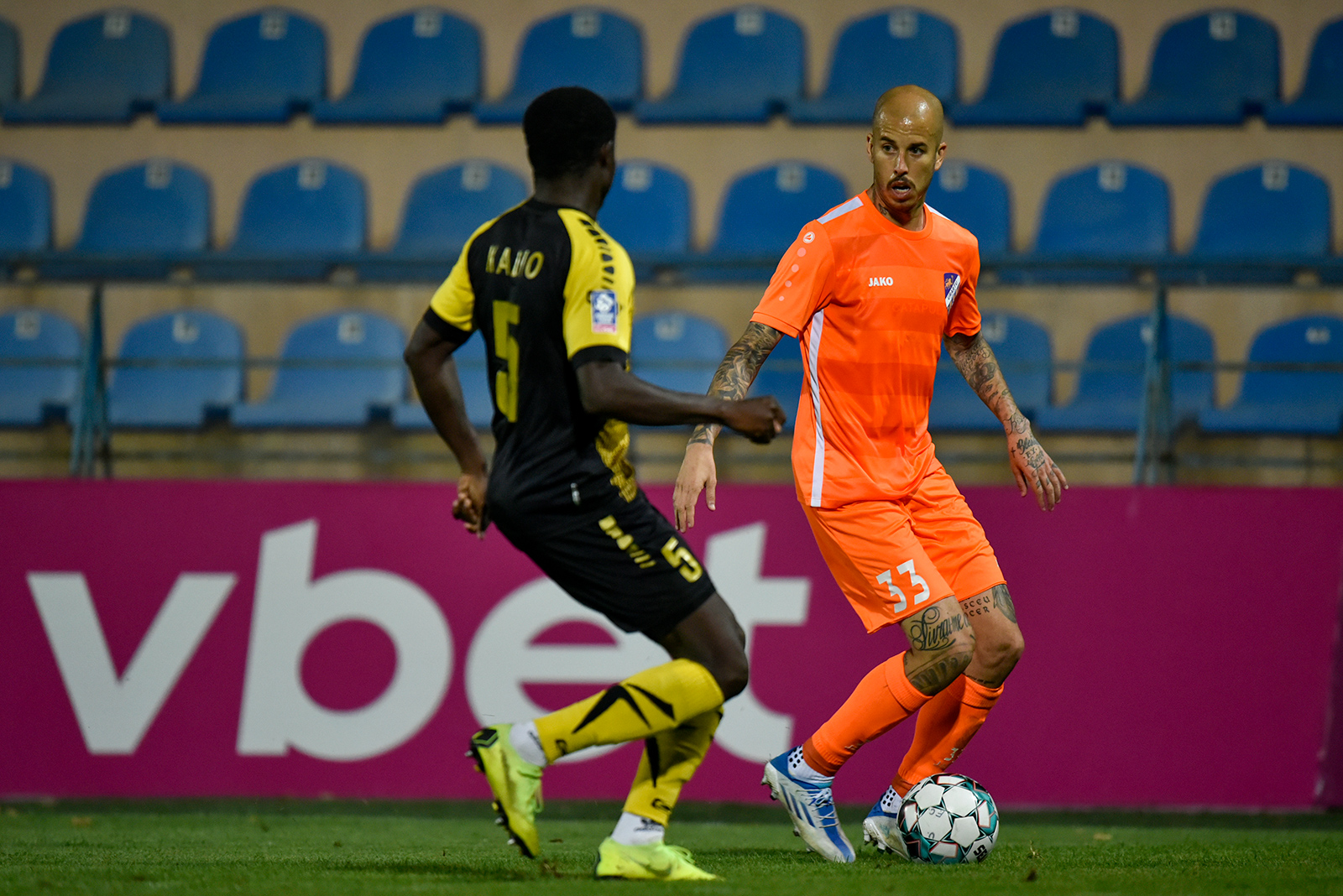

Personal information
- Full name: Marcos Antônio Candido Ferreira Júnior
- Date of birth: 13 May 1995 (age 31)
- Place of birth: Rio de Janeiro, Brazil
- Height: 1.79 m (5 ft 10 in)
- Position: Midfielder

Team information
- Current team: Náutico

Youth career
- 2014–2015: Bangu

Senior career*
Years	Team	Apps	(Gls)
2015–2016	Bonsucesso	19	(0)
2016	Volta Redonda	15	(4)
2017	América-RN	31	(4)
2018	Bangu	12	(1)
2018	ABC	17	(2)
2018	→ Paysandu (loan)	4	(0)
2019	Bangu	13	(1)
2019–2021	Vasco da Gama	69	(4)
2021	Remo	20	(2)
2021	Volta Redonda	24	(1)
2022–2023	Urartu	49	(4)
2023–	Náutico	22	(1)
- * Club domestic league appearances and goals as of 7 May 2024

Marcos Antônio Candido Ferreira Júnior (born 13 May 1995), commonly known as Marcos Júnior, is a Brazilian footballer who plays as a midfielder for Náutico.

== Career ==
On 11 August 2022, Urartu announced the signing of Marcos Júnior from Volta Redonda. On 15 December 2023, Marcos Júnior left Urartu by mutual consent.

On 22 December 2023, Náutico announced the signing of Marcos Júnior.

== Career statistics ==
=== Club ===
As of 12 February 2020.

Appearances and goals by club, season and competition
Club	Season	League			Cup		Continental		Other		Total	
Club	Season	Division	Apps	Goals	Apps	Goals	Apps	Goals	Apps	Goals	Apps	Goals
Bonsucesso	2015	–	–		–		–		5 (Note: Appearance(s) in the Copa Rio.)	0	5	0
Bonsucesso	2016	–	–		–		–		14 (Note: Appearances in the Campeonato Carioca.)	0	14	0
Bonsucesso	Total		0	0	0	0	0	0	19	0	19	0
Volta Redonda	2016	Série D	15	4	0	0	–		0	0	15	4
América-RN	2017	Série D	12	0	1	0	–		18 (Note: Twelve appearances and two goals in the Campeonato Potiguar, six appearances and two goals in Copa do Nordeste.)	4	31	4
Bangu	2018	–	–		–		–		12	1	12	1
ABC	2018	Série C	14	1	0	0	–		3 (Note: Appearance(s) in the Copa do Nordeste.)	1	17	2
Paysandu (loan)	2018	Série B	4	0	–		–		–		4	0
Bangu	2019	–	–		0	0	–		12	1	12	1
Vasco da Gama	2019	Série A	27	3	–		–		–		27	3
Vasco da Gama	2020	Série A	0	0	1	0	1 (Note: Appearance(s) in the Copa Sudamericana.)	0	4	0	6	0
Vasco da Gama	Total		27	3	1	0	1	0	4	0	33	3
Career total			72	8	2	0	1	0	68	7	143	15
