= Kaio Nunes =

Brazilian footballer (born 1996)

Personal information
- Full name: Kaio Nunes Ferreira
- Date of birth: 1 October 1996 (age 30)
- Place of birth: Brasília, Brazil
- Height: 1.80 m (5 ft 11 in)
- Position: Forward

Team information
- Current team: Java United
- Number: 9

Youth career
- 2013–2016: Brasília

Senior career*
Years	Team	Apps	(Gls)
2016	Brasília	0	(0)
2016	→ Goianésia (loan)	6	(0)
2017–2023	Real Brasília	29	(2)
2018	→ Brasil de Pelotas (loan)	22	(0)
2019	→ Ituano (loan)	0	(0)
2019–2021	→ Goiás (loan)	16	(0)
2021	→ Chapecoense (loan)	23	(3)
2022	→ Brusque (loan)	4	(0)
2022	→ Vila Nova (loan)	19	(3)
2023	→ CSA (loan)	19	(3)
2023	→ América RN (loan)	5	(0)
2023	→ Bolamense (loan)	0	(0)
2024	Brasiliense	11	(3)
2025	Paraná	0	(0)
2025	Aparecidense	15	(7)
2025	Al Ahli	0	(0)
2026	Borneo Samarinda	10	(3)
2026–	Java United	3	(0)
- * Club domestic league appearances and goals as of 19 September 2026

Kaio Nunes Ferreira (born 1 October 1996) is a Brazilian professional footballer who plays as a forward for Super League club Java United.

== Professional career ==
Kaio made his professional debut with Brasil de Pelotas in a 2-2 Campeonato Brasileiro Série B tie with Avaí FC on 21 April 2018.

== Career statistics ==
As of 7 February 2022

Club	Season	League			State League		Cup		Continental		Other		Total														
Club	Season	Division	Apps	Goals	Apps	Goals	Apps	Goals	Apps	Goals	Apps	Goals	Apps	Goals													
Brasília	2016	Brasiliense	—		0	0	0	0	—		0	0	0	0													
Goianésia (loan)	2016	Série D	6	0	—		—		—		—		6	0													
Real Brasília	2017	Brasiliense	—		8	0	—		—		—		8	0													
Real Brasília	2018	Brasiliense	—		13	2	—		—		—		13	2													
Real Brasília	2019	Brasiliense	—		8	0	—		—		—		8	0													
Real Brasília	Total		—		29	2	—		—		—		29	2													
Brasil de Pelotas (loan)	2018	Série B	22	0	—		—		—		—		22	0													
Ituano (loan)	2019	Série D	0	0	0	0	—		—		—		0	0													
Goiás (loan)	2019	Série A	13	0	—		—		—		6 (Note: Appearance(s) in Copa Verde)	0	19	0													
Goiás (loan)	2020	Série A	0	0	3	0	0	0	0	0	—		3	0													
Goiás (loan)	Total		13	0	3	0	0	0	0	0	6	0	22	0	Career total	59	3	35	2	2	0	0	0	6	0	102	5
