= João Carlos (footballer, born 1992) =

Brazilian footballer

Personal information
- Full name: João Carlos dos Santos Torres
- Date of birth: 18 May 1992 (age 34)
- Place of birth: Ribeirão Pires, Brazil
- Height: 1.81 m (5 ft 11 in)
- Position: Right back

Team information
- Current team: Altos

Youth career
- 2008–2010: Porto-PE
- 2011–2012: Cruzeiro

Senior career*
Years	Team	Apps	(Gls)
2010	Porto-PE	7	(0)
2010–2012	Cruzeiro	2	(0)
2013	→ Botafogo-SP (loan)	11	(0)
2014	Confiança	3	(0)
2015	Serra Talhada	17	(1)
2015–206	Santa Cruz	2	(0)
2016	→ Cruzeiro-RS (loan)	5	(0)
2016–2017	Campinense	3	(0)
2016	→ Flamengo-PE		
2017–2018	Brusque	32	(1)
2018	Fluminense de Feira	7	(0)
2018	Novo Horizonte		
2019	Cascavel	4	(2)
2019	Maringá	6	(0)
2019	Floresta	8	(0)
2020	Brusque	26	(0)
2021	Londrina	9	(0)
2021	Brusque	10	(0)
2022–	Altos	15	(0)
- * Club domestic league appearances and goals as of 21:42, 23 January 2020 (UTC)

João Carlos dos Santos Torres (born 18 May 1992), known as just João Carlos, is a Brazilian football right-back who plays for Altos.

== Honours ==
Confiança

- Campeonato Sergipano: 2014
