= Igor Fernandes =

Brazilian footballer (born 1992)

Personal information
- Full name: Igor Fernandes da Silva Araújo
- Date of birth: 6 June 1992 (age 34)
- Place of birth: São Paulo, Brazil
- Height: 1.83 m (6 ft 0 in)
- Position: Left back

Team information
- Current team: Náutico
- Number: 23

Youth career
- –2011: Flamengo-SP
- 2011–2013: Corinthians

Senior career*
Years	Team	Apps	(Gls)
2011–2016	Corinthians	21	(0)
2012	→ Flamengo-SP (loan)	15	(0)
2014	→ Sport Recife (loan)	11	(0)
2015	→ Linense (loan)	10	(0)
2015–2016	→ Tigres do Brasil (loan)	0	(0)
2017	Novorizontino	1	(0)
2017	Red Bull Brasil	5	(0)
2018	ABC	36	(1)
2018–2020	Avaí	44	(0)
2020	CSA	13	(0)
2021	Ferroviária	6	(0)
2021	Remo	30	(0)
2022	São Bernardo	13	(1)
2022	Água Santa		
2022–2023	Aimoré		
2023	Santo André	6	(0)
2023	Paysandu	16	(0)
2024	EC Santo André	11	(0)
2024	Ferroviária	22	(1)
2025–	Náutico	74	(1)
- * Club domestic league appearances and goals as of 18 November 2026

Igor Fernandes da Silva Araújo (born 6 June 1992), known as Igor Fernandes, is a Brazilian footballer who plays as a left back for Náutico.

== Career statistics ==
As of 19 November 2019

Club	Season	League			State League		Cup		Continental		Other		Total	
Club	Season	Division	Apps	Goals	Apps	Goals	Apps	Goals	Apps	Goals	Apps	Goals	Apps	Goals
Flamengo–SP	2012	Paulista A3	—		15	0	—		—		—		15	0
Corinthians	2013	Série A	13	0	5	0	3	0	0	0	—		21	0
Sport	2014	Série A	5	0	0	0	2	0	—		4 (Note: Appearance(s) in Copa do Nordeste)	0	11	0
Linense	2015	Paulista	—		10	0	—		—		—		10	0
Novorizontino	2017	Paulista	—		1	0	—		—		—		1	0
Red Bull Brasil	2017	Série D	5	0	—		—		—		—		5	0
ABC	2018	Série C	17	0	9	1	1	0	—		9	0	36	1
Avaí	2018	Série B	5	0	—		—		—		—		5	0
Avaí	2019	Série A	24	0	11	0	0	0	—		—		35	0
Avaí	Total		29	0	11	0	0	0	—		—		40	0
Career total			69	0	51	1	6	0	0	0	4	0	130	1

== Honours ==
Corinthians

- Campeonato Paulista: 2013
- Recopa Sudamericana: 2013

Sport Recife

- Copa do Nordeste: 2014

Avaí

- Campeonato Catarinense: 2019

Remo

- Copa Verde: 2021
