= Victor Sallinas =

Brazilian footballer

Personal information
- Full name: Victor Sallinas Ribeiro
- Date of birth: 20 March 1992 (age 34)
- Place of birth: São Bernardo do Campo, Brazil
- Height: 1.92 m (6 ft 4 in)
- Position: Centre-back

Team information
- Current team: Taguatinga

Senior career*
Years	Team	Apps	(Gls)
2012	Uberaba	0	(0)
2013	Vila Nova	4	(0)
2014	Tombense	0	(0)
2015–2016	Juventus	28	(1)
2017	Portuguesa Santista	16	(1)
2017–2018	Trabalhadores	24	(3)
2019	Juventude	10	(0)
2020	São Bento	4	(0)
2020	Avaí	6	(0)
2021	São José	8	(2)
2021	Confiança	8	(0)
2021–2022	Paysandu	5	(0)
2022	Athletic	3	(0)
2022–2023	RANS Nusantara	14	(0)
2023	Athletic	0	(0)
2023	Amazonas	5	(0)
2024–2025	Athletic	9	(0)
2025–2026	Itabirito	18	(3)
2026	Trabalhadores	11	(0)
2026	Brasiliense	6	(0)
2026–	Taguatinga	0	(0)
- * Club domestic league appearances and goals as of 17 May 2026

Victor Sallinas Ribeiro or simply Victor Sallinas (born 20 March 1992) is a Brazilian professional footballer who plays as a centre-back for Taguatinga.

== Club career ==
Born in São Paulo, he joined several local Brazilian clubs, and finally decided to go abroad to Indonesia and joined Liga 1 side RANS Nusantara for 2022 season.

=== RANS Nusantara ===
He was signed for RANS Nusantara to play in Liga 1 in the 2022 season. Sallinas made his RANS debut in a pre-season 2022 Indonesia President's Cup against PS Barito Putera on 14 June 2022 in a 1–1 draw. On 22 June 2022, he picked up his first win with RANS Nusantara in his third appearances in a 5–1 win over Persija Jakarta.
