= Santa Izabel do Oeste =

Coordinates: 25.8208°S 53.4839°W

- Municipality
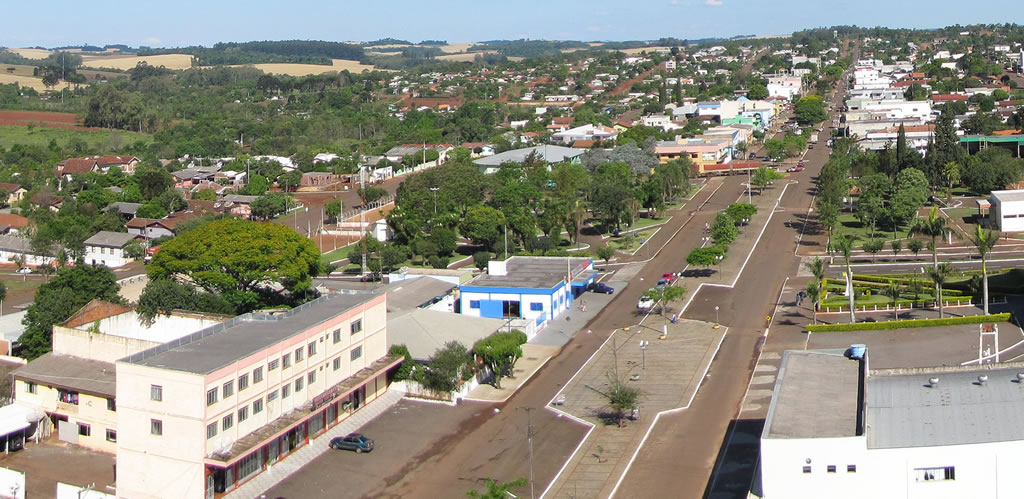

- Flag Coat of arms
- Interactive map of Santa Izabel do Oeste
- Country: Brazil
- Region: Southern
- State: Paraná
- Mesoregion: Sudoeste Paranaense

Population (2020)
  - Total: 14,794
- Time zone: UTC−3 (BRT)

Santa Izabel do Oeste is a municipality in the state of Paraná in the Southern Region of Brazil.

== See also ==
- List of municipalities in Paraná
