= Simão Bertelli =

Brazilian footballer

Personal information
- Full name: Simão Verza Bertelli
- Date of birth: 2 July 1993 (age 33)
- Place of birth: Antônio Prado, Brazil
- Height: 1.87 m (6 ft 2 in)
- Position: Goalkeeper

Team information
- Current team: Leixões
- Number: 1

Youth career
- 2009–2012: Criciúma
- 2012–2013: Novo Hamburgo

Senior career*
Years	Team	Apps	(Gls)
2012–2014	Novo Hamburgo	0	(0)
2014–2016	Tubarão	16	(0)
2015–2016	→ Glória (loan)	3	(0)
2016–2023	Operário Ferroviário	107	(0)
2019–2020	→ Paços de Ferreira (loan)	2	(0)
2023	ABC	33	(0)
2023–2026	AVS	27	(0)
2026–	Leixões	2	(0)
- * Club domestic league appearances and goals as of 11 September 2026

Simão Verza Bertelli (born 2 July 1993) is a Brazilian professional footballer who plays as a goalkeeper for Liga Portugal 2 club Leixões.

== Career ==
Simão made his debut for Glória in a 2–1 loss in the Campeonato Gaúcho against São Paulo-RS on February 3, 2016. After helping Operário achieve several promotions to the Campeonato Brasileiro Série B, on July 26, 2019, Simão joined Paços de Ferreira, a club in the Primeira Liga, on loan.

=== ABC ===
Simão was signed by ABC for the 2023 season, where he helped the club reach the third round of the Copa do Brasil and finish second in the Campeonato Potiguar (Rio Grande do Norte State Championship). He made 47 appearances until his contract was terminated on August 4, 2023.

AVS SADIn August 2023, Simão transferred to AVS SAD, a team competing in the Portuguese second division. One month later, Simão debuted in a 1–0 victory against Louletano in the Taça de Portugal.

Serving as a reserve for most of the season, he played a crucial role in securing promotion to the Primeira Liga via the playoffs.

== Career Statistics ==
=== Clubs ===
Appearances and Clean Sheets by Club, Season and Competition
Club	Season	National League			State League			National Cup			Other			Total		
Club	Season	Apps	Goals Conceded	Clean Sheets	Apps	Goals Conceded	Clean Sheets	Apps	Goals Conceded	Clean Sheets	Apps	Goals Conceded	Clean Sheets	Apps	Goals Conceded	Clean Sheets
Atlético Tubarão	2014 – 2016	–			–			–			16	13	9	16	13	9
Operário -PR	2016 – 2022	73	71	30	34	23	16	3	5	1	30	15	19	140	114	65
Paços de Ferreira	2019 – 2020	2	2	0	–			5	2	3	–			7	4	3
ABC	2023	19	28	3	14	6	9	4	3	2	10	8	4	47	45	18
AVS	2023 –	16	16	4	–			4	6	1	–			20	22	5
Other	12/14 & 15/16	–			4	4	1	–			5	–		9	4	1
Career total		56	90	13	36	19	20	14	12	7	40	23	23	239	202	101

== Honours ==
=== Novo Hamburgo ===
Copa FGF: 2013

=== Glória ===
Campeonato Gaúcho - Access Division: 2015

=== Operário-PR ===
Campeonato Brasileiro Série C: 2018

Campeonato Brasileiro Série D: 2017

FPF Cup: 2016

Campeonato Paranaense - 2nd Division: 2018
