= Rafinha (footballer, born June 1992) =

Brazilian footballer

Personal information
- Full name: Rafael Diniz Alves e Silva
- Date of birth: 21 June 1992 (age 34)
- Place of birth: Alumínio, Rio Grande do Sul, Brazil
- Height: 1.75 m (5 ft 9 in)
- Position: Attacking midfielder

Team information
- Current team: Floresta
- Number: 11

Youth career
- 2009–2011: Audax
- 2010–2011: → Porto (loan)

Senior career*
Years	Team	Apps	(Gls)
2011–2013	Audax	46	(15)
2013	→ Ponte Preta (loan)	5	(0)
2013	Guaratinguetá	9	(2)
2014–2015	Audax	19	(3)
2014	→ Guaratinguetá (loan)	17	(5)
2015	Atlético Paranaense	4	(1)
2015	→ ABC (loan)	11	(4)
2016	→ Ferroviária (loan)	11	(5)
2016	→ Ceará (loan)	5	(0)
2016–2017	Chiapas	6	(0)
2017	Audax	11	(1)
2017	Brasil de Pelotas	30	(9)
2018–2019	Goiás	45	(6)
2020	Botafogo-SP	33	(6)
2021	Mirassol	8	(1)
2021	Remo	22	(0)
2022	São Bernardo-SP	10	(0)
2022–2023	EC Vitória	32	(11)
2023–2024	América RN	24	(8)
2025	Botafogo-PB	14	(2)
2025	Barra-SC	9	(1)
2026–	Floresta	16	(4)
- * Club domestic league appearances and goals as of 9 November 2026

Rafael Diniz Alves e Silva (born 21 June 1992), commonly known as Rafinha, is a Brazilian footballer who plays for Floresta as an attacking midfielder.

== Club career ==
Born in Alumínio, São Paulo, Rafinha graduated with Audax's youth setup, after a period on loan at F.C. Porto. He made his senior debuts in 2011, appearing regularly.

On 16 May 2013 Rafinha joined Ponte Preta, in Série A. He made his debut for the club on 9 June, coming on as a late substitute for Chiquinho in a 0–2 home loss against Botafogo.

After appearing rarely for Ponte, Rafinha moved to Guaratinguetá in September 2013. In January 2014 he returned to Audax, with the side now in the main category of Campeonato Paulista.

After a loan stint back at Guará, Rafinha returned to his parent club in December 2014. On 6 March 2015 he signed a three-year deal with Atlético Paranaense.

In July 2015, Rafinha joined ABC Futebol Clube in Campeonato Brasileiro Série B.
