= Tony Batista (footballer) =

Brazilian footballer

Personal information
- Full name: Antonio Eduardo Furquim de Freitas Batista
- Date of birth: 25 September 1992 (age 34)
- Place of birth: Rio Verde, Brazil
- Height: 1.94 m (6 ft 4 in)
- Position: Goalkeeper

Team information
- Current team: Athletic

Senior career*
Years	Team	Apps	(Gls)
2010	Rio Verde		
2011	Morrinhos	1	(0)
2012–2014	Vila Nova	31	(0)
2014	Atlético Goianiense		
2015	América-GO		
2016	Anapolina	13	(0)
2016–2017	Grêmio Anápolis	0	(0)
2016–2017	→ União da Madeira (loan)	16	(0)
2017	Grêmio Anápolis	17	(0)
2018–2019	Leixões	36	(0)
2019	Cova da Piedade	23	(0)
2020–2021	Aparecidense	39	(0)
2021	Floresta	15	(0)
2021	Morrinhos	8	(0)
2022	Vila Nova	36	(0)
2023	Guarani	17	(0)
2023–2024	Al-Jandal	29	(0)
2024–2025	Kheybar	15	(0)
2025	KF Bylis	12	(0)
2025–2026	Maringá	22	(0)
2026–	Athletic	2	(0)
- * Club domestic league appearances and goals as of 18 November 2026

Antonio Eduardo Furquim de Freitas Batista (born 25 September 1992), known as Tony, is a Brazilian football player who plays as a goalkeeper for Athletic.

== Club career ==
He made his professional debut in the Campeonato Brasileiro Série B for Vila Nova on 16 July 2014 in a game against Boa.

On 8 July 2023, Batista joined Saudi Arabian club Al-Jandal.
