= Bocão =

Brazilian footballer (born 1992)

Personal information
- Full name: Jonathan Ferreira da Silva
- Date of birth: 3 November 1992 (age 34)
- Place of birth: Taguatinga, Federal District, Brazil
- Height: 1.79 m (5 ft 10 in)
- Position: Right back

Team information
- Current team: Confiança

Youth career
- Rondonópolis
- 2009: Vila Nova
- 2010: Araguaína

Senior career*
Years	Team	Apps	(Gls)
2011	Cruzeiro-DF		
2012–2013	Brasiliense	28	(1)
2014	Legião	1	(0)
2014	Avaí	50	(0)
2015	Goiás	0	(0)
2015–2016	CRB	66	(2)
2017	Ferroviária	8	(0)
2017	ABC	24	(0)
2018	Santo André	4	(0)
2019	Água Santa	4	(0)
2019	ABC	2	(0)
2019–2021	Vitória	29	(0)
2021	Água Santa	6	(0)
2021–	Confiança	1	(0)
- * Club domestic league appearances and goals as of 26 February 2018

Jonathan Ferreira da Silva (born 3 November 1992), commonly known as Bocão, is a Brazilian footballer who plays as a right back for Confiança.

== Club career ==
Born in Taguatinga, Federal District, Bocão made his senior debuts with Cruzeiro-DF in 2011. On 3 December of the same year he moved to Brasiliense,

On 11 December 2013, Bocão signed for Avaí. He made his professional debut on 19 April of the following year, starting in a 1–3 away loss against América-RN for the Série B championship.

On 6 January 2015, after appearing in 30 matches for Avaí and being promoted to Série A, Bocão joined Goiás.
