= Felippe Borges =

Brazilian footballer

Personal information
- Full name: Felippe Borges
- Date of birth: 4 December 1999 (age 26)
- Place of birth: Bento Gonçalves, Brazil
- Height: 1.79 m (5 ft 10 in)
- Position: Left-back

Team information
- Current team: Manauara

Youth career
- 2013–2015: Juventude
- 2016: Esportivo
- 2017: Lajeadense
- 2018–2019: Juventude

Senior career*
Years	Team	Apps	(Gls)
2018–2020	Juventude	19	(0)
2020	→ Boa Esporte (loan)	5	(0)
2021	Remo	3	(0)
2022	Betim	12	(0)
2022	Boston City Brasil	6	(0)
2023–2024	Confiança	61	(0)
2022	→ Vitória (loan)	0	(0)
2025–2026	São José-SP	30	(0)
2025	→ Marcílio Dias (loan)	6	(0)
2025	→ Botafogo-PB (loan)	4	(0)
2026–	Manauara	1	(0)
- * Club domestic league appearances and goals as of 20:49, 14 May 2026 (UTC)

Felippe Borges (born 4 December 1999) is a Brazilian footballer who plays as a left-back for Manauara.

== Career ==
Born in Bento Gonçalves, Rio Grande do Sul, Borges finished his formation with Juventude, and made his first team debut during the 2019 season. On 11 August 2020, he was loaned to Boa Esporte for the remainder of the season.

On 2 March 2021, Borges signed for Remo, but left by mutual consent on 18 May, after just four matches. He then played for Betim and Boston City Brasil in the 2022 season, before being announced at Confiança on 16 November of that year.

Regularly used, Borges was loaned to Vitória on 14 September 2023. After failing to make an appearance, he returned to his parent club, being again a first-choice.

On 6 November 2024, São José-SP announced the signing of Borges for the ensuing campaign. He was loaned to Marcílio Dias the following 3 April, and moved to Botafogo-PB also in a temporary deal on 3 June.

== Career statistics ==
As of 14 May 2026

Club	Season	League			State League		Cup		Continental		Other		Total	
Club	Season	Division	Apps	Goals	Apps	Goals	Apps	Goals	Apps	Goals	Apps	Goals	Apps	Goals
Juventude	2018	Série B	—		—		—		—		11 (Note: Appearance(s) in Copa FGF)	0	11	0
Juventude	2019	Série C	8	0	3	0	1	0	—		—		12	0
Juventude	2020	Série B	1	0	7	0	—		—		—		8	0
Juventude	Total		9	0	10	0	1	0	—		11	0	31	0
Boa Esporte (loan)	2020	Série C	5	0	—		—		—		—		5	0
Remo	2021	Série B	—		3	0	1	0	—		—		4	0
Betim	2022	Mineiro Módulo II	—		12	0	—		—		—		12	0
Boston City Brasil	2022	Mineiro 2ª Divisão	—		6	0	—		—		—		6	0
Confiança	2023	Série C	18	0	13	0	—		—		2 (Note: Appearance(s) in Copa do Nordeste)	0	33	0
Confiança	2024	Série C	18	0	12	0	1	0	—		1	0	32	0
Confiança	Total		36	0	25	0	1	0	—		3	0	65	0
Vitória (loan)	2023	Série B	0	0	—		—		—		—		0	0
São José-SP	2025	Paulista A2	—		15	0	—		—		—		15	0
São José-SP	2026	Paulista A2	—		15	0	—		—		—		15	0
São José-SP	Total		—		30	0	—		—		—		30	0
Marcílio Dias (loan)	2025	Série D	6	0	—		—		—		—		6	0
Botafogo-PB (loan)	2025	Série C	4	0	—		—		—		—		4	0
Manauara	2026	Série D	1	0	—		—		—		—		1	0
Career total			61	0	86	0	3	0	0	0	14	0	164	0
