= Dioguinho (footballer) =

Brazilian footballer (born 1995)

Personal information
- Full name: Diogo dos Santos Carvalho
- Date of birth: December 27, 1995 (age 30)
- Place of birth: Belém, Brazil
- Height: 1.75 m (5 ft 9 in)
- Position: Attacking midfielder

Team information
- Current team: Amazonas

Youth career
- 2016–2017: Izabelense

Senior career*
Years	Team	Apps	(Gls)
2017–2018	Ypiranga	2	(0)
2018–2019	Paragominas	3	(0)
2019	Amazonas	4	(1)
2019–2020	Castanhal	11	(5)
2020–2022	Remo	45	(6)
2021	→ Ferroviário (loan)	7	(0)
2022–2023	Paysandu	27	(4)
2023	Al-Minaa	13	(7)
2023–	Amazonas	0	(0)
- * Club domestic league appearances and goals as of 2 August 2023

Diogo dos Santos Carvalho or simply Dioguinho (born December 27, 1995), is a Brazilian professional footballer who plays as a midfielder for Campeonato Brasileiro Série C club Amazonas.

== Early life ==
Born in Santa Izabel, in the metropolitan region of Belém, Dioguinho started out in amateur teams and played in tournaments in other states. He has already gone through tests in Santos and Guarani, but at the time he did not succeed. Faced with this scenario, the midfielder abandoned the ball and went to work cutting chickens in a slaughterhouse for about a year and a half, then he returned to playing football for Izabelense, Ypiranga, and then Paragominas, and was part of the Amazonas team that won the 2019 Campeonato Amazonense Second Division, until he settled down to play for Castanhal.

== Career ==
=== Remo ===
On September 16, 2020, Dioguinho signed a contract with Remo and joined them, and the following year, 2021, he started with the team to a perfect start, scoring two goals in the first two matches.

==== Ferroviário (loan) ====
On August 8, 2021, Dioguinho joined Ferroviário on loan until December without an option to buy.

=== Paysandu ===
On December 1, 2021, Paysandu announced the signing of Dioguinho, coming from Remo, as he was a midfielder on loan to Ferroviário. The player's contract was approved by Paysandu's football technical coordinator, Lecheva, who had known the player since they worked together at Izabelense in 2017 and Amazonas in 2019.

=== Al-Minaa ===
On December 30, 2022, Dioguinho renewed his contract with Paysandu for an additional year, but changed his mind after receiving an offer from Iraq, where in January 2023 he moved to play in the Iraqi First Division League, where he signed a six-month contract with Al-Minaa. In the player's first appearance with his new club, he was able to score the victory goal against Masafi Al-Wasat, as Al-Minaa won 1–0 and rose from third to second place in the ranking table. In all, he managed to score 7 goals in 13 matches, and to be an important part of the team that won the league title.

== Honours ==
Amazonas

- Campeonato Amazonense Second Division: 2019

Remo

- Campeonato Brasileiro Série C runner-up: 2020
- Copa Verde runner-up: 2020

Paysandu

- Campeonato Paraense runner-up: 2022
- Copa Verde: 2022

Al-Minaa

- Iraqi First Division League: 2022–23
