= Jéferson Lima =

Brazilian footballer

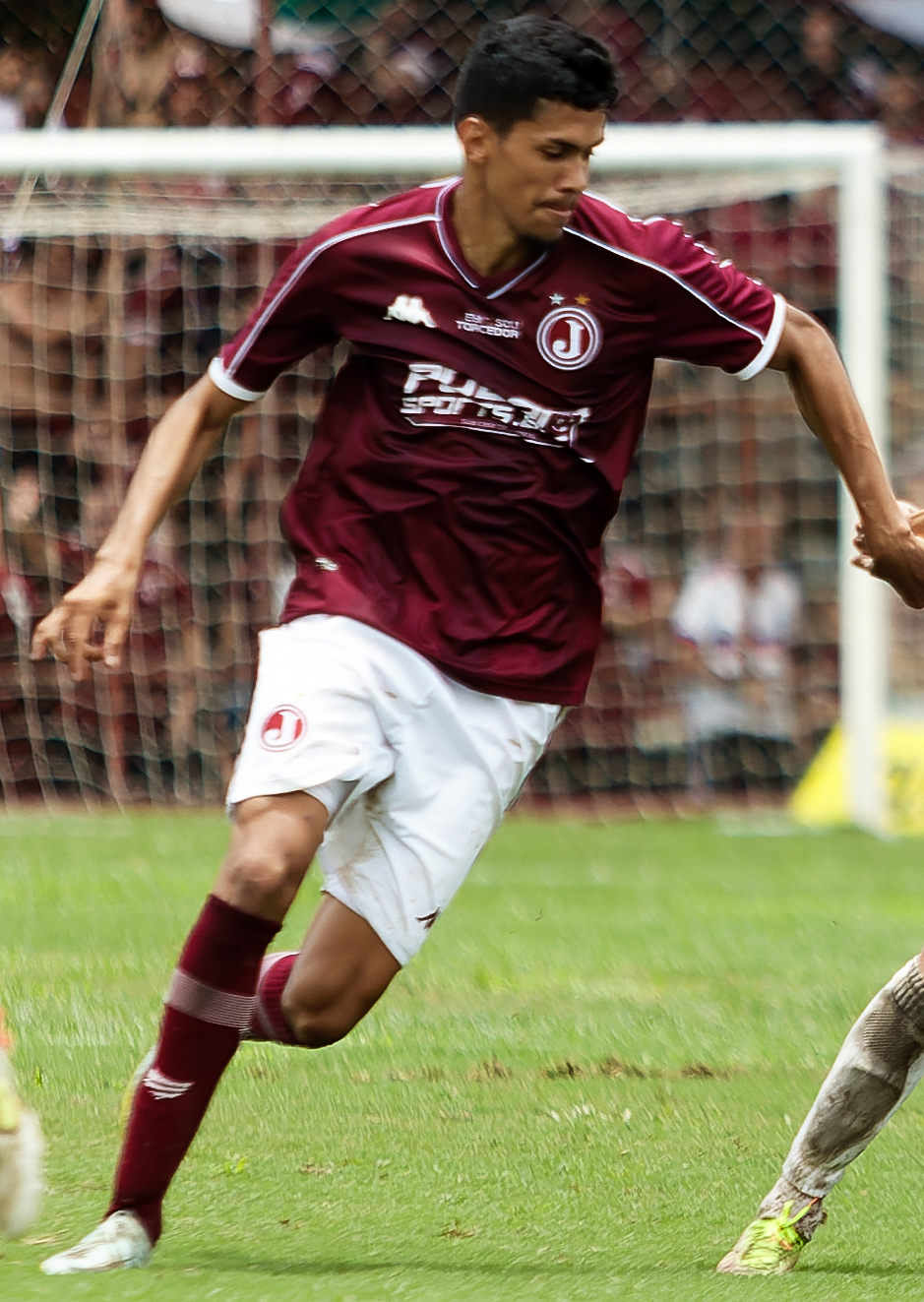
- Jéferson Lima playing for Juventus-SP in 2023

Personal information
- Full name: Jéferson Wagner de Lima Bólico
- Date of birth: 7 February 1997 (age 29)
- Place of birth: Novo Hamburgo, Brazil
- Height: 1.83 m (6 ft 0 in)
- Position: Defensive midfielder

Youth career
- 2014: Rio Claro
- 2015–2017: São Paulo

Senior career*
| Years | Team | Apps | (Gls) |
| 2017–2020 | Internacional | 1 | (0) |
| 2019 | → Paraná (loan) | 5 | (0) |
| 2020 | → Confiança (loan) | 32 | (1) |
| 2021 | Remo | 6 | (0) |
| 2021 | Rio Claro | 0 | (0) |
| 2022 | Taubaté | 14 | (0) |
| 2022 | Campinense | 24 | (0) |
| 2023 | Juventus-SP | 13 | (2) |
| 2023–2026 | São José-SP | 47 | (0) |
- * Club domestic league appearances and goals as of 20:39, 17 November 2026 (UTC)

Jéferson Wagner de Lima Bólico (born 7 February 1997), known as Jéferson Lima or just Jéferson, is a Brazilian footballer who plays as a defensive midfielder.

== Career ==
Born in Novo Hamburgo, Rio Grande do Sul, Jéferson finished his formation with São Paulo, but moved to Internacional soon after the 2017 Copa São Paulo de Futebol Júnior. Initially a member of the under-23 team, he made his professional debut on 17 October of that year, starting in a 0–0 Série B away draw against Boa Esporte.

Jéferson then returned to the under-23 team of Inter, before being loaned out to Paraná on 11 January 2019. Rarely used, he returned to his parent club in June, and spent a period back at the under-23s before joining Confiança also in a temporary deal on 13 December.

A regular starter, Jéferson scored his first senior goal on 1 February 2020, netting the opener in a 1–1 Copa do Nordeste away draw against Botafogo-PB. On 15 February of the following year, he moved to fellow Série B side Remo.

On 20 April 2021, Jéferson left Remo by mutual consent, and finished the season at Rio Claro, club he already represented as a youth. He joined Taubaté on 13 December, before signing for Campinense on 20 March 2022.

On 9 January 2023, Juventus-SP announced the signing of Jéferson. On 26 May, he moved to São José-SP.

== Career statistics ==
As of 17 November 2026

| Club | Season | League | | | State League | | Cup | | Continental | | Other | | Total | |
| Club | Season | Division | Apps | Goals | Apps | Goals | Apps | Goals | Apps | Goals | Apps | Goals | Apps | Goals |
|---|---|---|---|---|---|---|---|---|---|---|---|---|---|---|
| Internacional | 2017 | Série B | 1 | 0 | — | | — | | — | | — | | 1 | 0 |
| Internacional | 2018 | Série A | 0 | 0 | — | | — | | — | | 8 (Note: Appearance(s) in Copa FGF) | 1 | 8 | 1 |
| Internacional | 2019 | Série A | 0 | 0 | — | | — | | — | | 9 | 0 | 9 | 0 |
| Internacional | Total | | 1 | 0 | — | | — | | — | | 17 | 1 | 18 | 1 |
| Paraná (loan) | 2019 | Série B | — | | 5 | 0 | — | | — | | — | | 5 | 0 |
| Confiança (loan) | 2020 | Série B | 22 | 1 | 10 | 0 | — | | — | | 9 (Note: Appearance(s) in Copa do Nordeste) | 2 | 41 | 3 |
| Remo | 2021 | Série B | — | | 6 | 0 | 1 | 0 | — | | — | | 7 | 0 |
| Rio Claro | 2021 | Paulista A2 | — | | — | | — | | — | | 5 (Note: Appearance(s) in Copa Paulista) | 0 | 5 | 0 |
| Taubaté | 2022 | Paulista A2 | — | | 14 | 0 | — | | — | | — | | 14 | 0 |
| Campinense | 2022 | Série C | 18 | 0 | 6 | 0 | — | | — | | — | | 24 | 0 |
| Juventus-SP | 2023 | Paulista A2 | — | | 13 | 2 | — | | — | | — | | 13 | 2 |
| São José-SP | 2023 | Paulista A3 | — | | — | | — | | — | | 10 | 1 | 10 | 1 |
| São José-SP | 2024 | Série D | 12 | 0 | 11 | 0 | — | | — | | — | | 23 | 0 |
| São José-SP | 2025 | Paulista A2 | — | | 10 | 0 | — | | — | | 9 | 0 | 19 | 0 |
| São José-SP | 2026 | Paulista A2 | — | | 14 | 0 | — | | — | | 10 | 0 | 24 | 0 |
| São José-SP | Total | | 12 | 0 | 35 | 0 | — | | — | | 29 | 0 | 76 | 0 |
| Career total | | | 53 | 1 | 89 | 2 | 1 | 0 | 0 | 0 | 60 | 4 | 203 | 7 |

== Honours ==
São Paulo U20

- U-20 Copa Libertadores: 2016
- Copa do Brasil Sub-20: 2016

Internacional

- Campeonato Brasileiro de Aspirantes: 2017, 2019

Confiança

- Campeonato Sergipano: 2020

Campinense

- Campeonato Paraibano: 2022

São José-SP

- Copa Paulista: 2026
