= Vinícius Kiss =

Brazilian footballer

Personal information
- Full name: Vinícius Kiss Silva Tobias
- Date of birth: June 8, 1988 (age 38)
- Place of birth: São Paulo, Brazil
- Height: 1.84 m (6 ft 0 in)
- Position: Central midfielder

Team information
- Current team: Floresta

Senior career*
Years	Team	Apps	(Gls)
2009	Marília	2	(0)
2009	Atlético Sorocaba	0	(0)
2010	União Barbarense	0	(0)
2011	Oeste	2	(0)
2011	Guarani-MG	0	(0)
2012	Boa Esporte	9	(0)
2012	Ipatinga	33	(0)
2013	Red Bull Brasil	4	(0)
2013	Itumbiara	6	(0)
2013	Linense	4	(0)
2014	Central	0	(0)
2014	Cuiabá	2	(1)
2014	Ipatinga	2	(1)
2015	Guarani-MG	8	(0)
2015–2016	Tupi	62	(4)
2017	São Bernardo	19	(3)
2017	Paraná	17	(1)
2018–2019	São Caetano	26	(0)
2018	→ Coritiba (loan)	20	(1)
2019	→ São Bento (loan)	20	(2)
2020	Novorizontino	6	(0)
2020	Sampaio Corrêa	34	(0)
2021	Botafogo-SP	7	(0)
2021	Remo	7	(0)
2021	Figueirense	18	(0)
2022	Paraná	25	(0)
2022–	Floresta	0	(0)
- * Club domestic league appearances and goals as of 23 July 2022

Vinícius Kiss Silva Tobias (born June 8, 1988), or simply Vinícius Kiss, is a Brazilian professional footballer who plays as a central midfielder.

== Honours ==
Sampaio Corrêa

- Campeonato Maranhense: 2020
