= Luis Gustavo (footballer, born 1989) =

Brazilian footballer

Personal information
- Full name: Luis Gustavo Lopes Santos
- Date of birth: 5 July 1989 (age 37)
- Place of birth: Rio de Janeiro, Brazil
- Height: 1.79 m (5 ft 10 in)
- Position: Right back

Team information
- Current team: Hercílio Luz

Youth career
- 1997–2007: Flamengo

Senior career*
Years	Team	Apps	(Gls)
2008	Videira		
2009	Sendas	0	(0)
2009–2011	Campo Grande		
2012	Castelo Branco		
2013–2014	Ceres	26	(1)
2014–2015	Bežanija	21	(2)
2015	Bonsucesso	0	(0)
2016–2019	Volta Redonda	78	(5)
2018	→ Sampaio Corrêa (loan)	13	(0)
2020–2021	Portuguesa-RJ	27	(0)
2020	→ Sampaio Corrêa (loan)	36	(2)
2021	São Bernardo	3	(0)
2021	Sampaio Corrêa	22	(1)
2022	ABC	17	(0)
2022	Portuguesa-RJ	12	(0)
2023	Brasil de Pelotas	8	(1)
2023	Portuguesa	0	(0)
2023–	Hercílio Luz	0	(0)
- * Club domestic league appearances and goals as of 16 September 2023

Luis Gustavo Lopes Santos (born 5 July 1989), known as Luis Gustavo, is a Brazilian footballer who plays as a right back for Hercílio Luz.

== Club career ==
Luis Gustavo was born in Rio de Janeiro, and was a Flamengo youth graduate. After making his senior debut with Videira in the 2008 Campeonato Catarinense Série C, he returned to his native state and represented Sendas, Campo Grande, Castelo Branco and Ceres.

In 2014, Luis Gustavo moved abroad and signed for Serbian First League side Bežanija. He returned to Brazil in the following year with Bonsucesso, before agreeing to a contract with Volta Redonda.

On 8 August 2018, Luis Gustavo was loaned to Série B side Sampaio Corrêa until the end of the year. Back to Voltaço for the 2019 season, he featured regularly before moving to Portuguesa-RJ on 1 November of that year.

Luis Gustavo returned to Sampaio in July 2020, again on loan. He started the 2021 campaign back at Lusa Carioca, and had a short period at São Bernardo before rejoining Sampaio on 5 June 2021, now in a permanent contract.

On 6 December 2021, Luis Gustavo signed for ABC. Despite being a regular starter in the club's 2022 Campeonato Potiguar winning campaign, he left on 18 March 2022, and returned to Portuguesa-RJ on 23 April.

In November 2022, Luis Gustavo agreed to a deal with Brasil de Pelotas for the upcoming season. On 2 May 2023, he signed a short-term deal with Portuguesa.

== Career statistics ==
As of 1 November 2023

Club	Season	League			State League		Cup		Continental		Other		Total	
Club	Season	Division	Apps	Goals	Apps	Goals	Apps	Goals	Apps	Goals	Apps	Goals	Apps	Goals
Ceres	2013	Carioca Série B	—		13	1	—		—		7 (Note: Appearance(s) in Copa Rio)	1	20	2
Ceres	2014	Carioca Série B	—		13	0	—		—		—		13	0
Ceres	Total		—		26	1	—		—		7	1	33	2
Bežanija	2014–15	Serbian First League	21	2	—		1	0	—		—		22	2
Bonsucesso	2015	Carioca	—		0	0	—		—		10	0	10	0
Volta Redonda	2016	Série D	12	2	13	1	—		—		—		25	3
Volta Redonda	2017	Série C	18	0	12	0	1	0	—		—		31	0
Volta Redonda	2018	Série C	13	1	10	0	—		—		—		23	1
Volta Redonda	2019	Série C	10	1	10	0	—		—		—		20	1
Volta Redonda	Total		53	4	45	1	1	0	—		—		99	5
Sampaio Corrêa (loan)	2018	Série B	13	0	—		—		—		—		13	0
Portuguesa-RJ	2020	Série D	0	0	14	0	—		—		—		14	0
Portuguesa-RJ	2021	Carioca	—		13	0	—		—		—		13	0
Portuguesa-RJ	Total		0	0	27	0	—		—		—		27	0
Sampaio Corrêa (loan)	2020	Série B	30	1	6	1	—		—		—		36	2
São Bernardo	2021	Paulista	—		3	0	—		—		—		3	0
Sampaio Corrêa	2021	Série B	22	1	—		—		—		—		22	1
ABC	2022	Série D	0	0	17	0	2	0	—		—		19	0
Portuguesa-RJ	2022	Série D	12	0	—		—		—		2	0	14	0
Brasil de Pelotas	2023	Série D	0	0	8	1	4	0	—		—		12	1
Portuguesa	2023	Paulista	—		0	0	—		—		8 (Note: Appearance(s) in Copa Paulista)	1	8	1
Career total			25	0	92	3	0	0	0	0	70	2	187	5

== Honours ==
Volta Redonda

- Campeonato Brasileiro Série D: 2016

Sampaio Corrêa

- Campeonato Maranhense: 2020

São Bernardo

- Campeonato Paulista Série A2: 2021

ABC

- Campeonato Potiguar: 2022
