= Laércio (footballer, born 1998) =

Brazilian footballer

Personal information
- Full name: Laércio da Silva Carvalho
- Date of birth: 17 November 1998 (age 27)
- Position: Midfielder

Team information
- Current team: Amazonas

Youth career
- –2018: Salgueiro
- 2018: → Cruzeiro (loan)

Senior career*
Years	Team	Apps	(Gls)
2018	Salgueiro	0	(0)
2018	→ Cruzeiro (loan)	2	(0)
2019–	Cruzeiro	0	(0)
2019	→ Ipatinga (loan)	0	(0)
- * Club domestic league appearances and goals as of 20:31, 29 May 2019 (UTC)

Laércio da Silva Carvalho (born 17 November 1998), commonly known as Laércio, is a Brazilian footballer who currently plays as a midfielder for Amazonas.

== Career statistics ==
=== Club ===
As of 29 May 2019.

Club	Season	League			State League		Cup		Continental		Other		Total	
Club	Season	Division	Apps	Goals	Apps	Goals	Apps	Goals	Apps	Goals	Apps	Goals	Apps	Goals
Salgueiro	2018	Série C	0	0	6 (Note: Appearances in the Campeonato Pernambucano)	0	1 (Note: Appearances in the Copa do Brasil)	0	–		5 (Note: Appearances in the Copa do Nordeste)	0	12	0
Cruzeiro (loan)	2018	Série A	2	0	0	0	0	0	0	0	0	0	2	0
Cruzeiro	2019	Série A	0	0	0	0	0	0	0	0	0	0	0	0
Cruzeiro	Total		2	0	0	0	0	0	0	0	0	0	2	0
Ipatinga (loan)	2019	–			9 (Note: Appearances in the Campeonato Mineiro Module II)	0	0	0	–		0	0	9	0
Career total			2	0	15	0	1	0	0	0	5	0	23	0
