= Thiago Ennes =

Brazilian footballer

Personal information
- Full name: Thiago Ennes Moreira
- Date of birth: 5 March 1996 (age 30)
- Place of birth: Magé, Brazil
- Height: 1.78 m (5 ft 10 in)
- Position: Right back

Team information
- Current team: Santa Cruz
- Number: 2

Youth career
- 2008–2011: Rio de Janeiro
- 2012–2014: Fluminense
- 2014–2016: Flamengo

Senior career*
Years	Team	Apps	(Gls)
2016–2018	Flamengo	0	(0)
2017	→ União da Madeira (loan)	2	(0)
2017	→ Cuiabá (loan)	0	(0)
2018	→ Náutico (loan)	6	(0)
2019	São Bernardo	0	(0)
2019–2021	Confiança	51	(0)
2021	Remo	46	(0)
2022	Santo André	4	(0)
2022	Sampaio Corrêa	6	(0)
2022	CN Capibaribe	4	(0)
2022–2023	Paysandu	6	(0)
2023	Campinense	10	(0)
2024	Londrina	33	(3)
2025	Caxias	31	(0)
2026–	Santa Cruz	14	(0)
- * Club domestic league appearances and goals as of 9 November 2026

Thiago Ennes Moreira (born 5 March 1996 in Magé) is a Brazilian footballer who plays as right back for Campeonato Brasileiro Série C club Santa Cruz.

== Career ==
=== São Bernardo ===
On 29 January 2019 Thiago signed with São Bernardo. At the club he played a total of five Campeonato Paulista Série A2 matches before switching clubs again.

=== Confiança ===
On 16 April 2019 Thiago signed with Confiança to play the 2019 Série C.

== Career statistics ==
(Correct As of 22 July 2021.)

Appearances and goals by club, season and competition
Club	Season	League			Cup		Continental		Other		Total	
Club	Season	Division	Apps	Goals	Apps	Goals	Apps	Goals	Apps	Goals	Apps	Goals
Flamengo	2016	Série A	0	0	0	0	–		0	0	0	0
União da Madeira (loan)	2016–17	LigaPro	2	0	–		–		–		2	0
União da Madeira (loan)	2017–18	LigaPro	1	0	2	0	–		–		3	0
União da Madeira (loan)	Total		3	0	2	0	0	0	0	0	5	0
Cuiabá (loan)	2017	Série C	0	0	–		–		–		0	0
Náutico (loan)	2018	Série C	6	0	6	0	–		16	0	28	0
São Bernardo	2019	Paulista A2	–		–		–		5	0	5	0
Confiança	2019	Série C	20	0	–		–		0	0	20	0
Confiança	2020	Série B	31	0	–		–		21	1	52	1
Confiança	Total		51	0	0	0	0	0	21	1	72	1
Remo	2021	Série B	12	0	3	0	–		–		15	0
Paysandu	2022	Serie C	0	0	0	0	0	0	0	0	0	0
Total			72	0	8	0	0	0	42	1	125	1

== Honours ==
Náutico

- Campeonato Pernambucano: 2018

Confiança

- Campeonato Sergipano: 2020
