= Daniel Cruz (footballer, born 1990) =

Brazilian footballer

Personal information
- Full name: Daniel Paulo da Cruz
- Date of birth: 3 June 1990 (age 36)
- Place of birth: Niterói, Brazil
- Height: 1.86 m (6 ft 1 in)
- Position: Forward

Youth career
- 2009: Guarani
- 2010–2011: Corinthians

Senior career*
Years	Team	Apps	(Gls)
2012	Taboão da Serra	0	(0)
2012	EC São Bernardo	0	(0)
2012	Once Municipal	9	(3)
2013	Democrata-SL	0	(0)
2013	EC São Bernardo	0	(0)
2014	Social	0	(0)
2015	Santa Rita	0	(0)
2015	CRB	14	(2)
2016	Botafogo-PB	0	(0)
2016	Boa Esporte	23	(7)
2017	CSA	0	(0)
2017	São Caetano	0	(0)
2017	→ ABC (loan)	8	(0)
2018	Caxias do Sul	0	(0)
2018	Boa Esporte	30	(2)
2019	Brasil de Pelotas	11	(0)
2020	Criciúma	0	(0)
- * Club domestic league appearances and goals as of 21:05, 15 September 2020 (UTC)

Daniel Paulo da Cruz, commonly known as Daniel Cruz, is a Brazilian footballer who plays as a forward.

== Career ==
A product of the youth systems of Guarani and later Corinthians, Daniel Cruz spent the first year of his career playing lower division Campeonato Paulista football with Taboão da Serra and EC São Bernardo. His breakthrough into national division football came outside Brazil, with El Salvador Primera División Once Municipal. He arrived on trial in August 2012 and stayed until the end of the season. He scored twice in his debut against UES, the club's only win of the 2012 Apertura, before being released in November.

Returning to Brazil, he again played lower division state football in both Campeonato Mineiro and Campeonato Paulista. He gained attention as the top scorer in the 2013 Campeonato Alagoano for Santa Rita, leading to his signing with CRB for 2015 Campeonato Brasileiro Série B. In January 2016, he signed with Botafogo-PB to play in the Campeonato Paraibano and the 2016 Copa do Nordeste. He left in March by mutual agreement to join Boa Esporte and play in the 2016 Campeonato Brasileiro Série C. He had a good league campaign with Boa Esporte, scoring seven goals as the team went on to win the title.

Daniel Cruz returned to Alagoas with CSA in time for the 2017 season, but did not find regular game time there, or with São Caetano whom he joined in March of the same year. At the end of São Caetano's state campaign, he was loaned to ABC, who were struggling at the start of 2017 Campeonato Brasileiro Série C. At the end of the season, he joined Caxias do Sul.

In April 2018, Daniel Cruz joined Boa Esporte for a second time, and played a large part in their 2018 Campeonato Brasileiro Série B season. At the end of the season, he moved to Brasil de Pelotas with teammate Douglas Baggio.
