= Renan Oliveira (footballer, born 1989) =

Brazilian footballer

Personal information
- Full name: Renan Henrique Oliveira Vieira
- Date of birth: 29 December 1989 (age 36)
- Place of birth: Itabira, Brazil
- Height: 1.82 m (6 ft 0 in)
- Position: Attacking midfielder

Youth career
- 2006–2008: Atlético Mineiro

Senior career*
Years	Team	Apps	(Gls)
2008–2016	Atlético Mineiro	107	(25)
2010	→ Vitória (loan)	11	(1)
2012	→ Coritiba (loan)	8	(0)
2012–2013	→ Goiás (loan)	80	(14)
2014	→ Sport (loan)	16	(0)
2014	→ América Mineiro (loan)	100	(1)
2015	→ Avaí (loan)	41	(2)
2016	→ Náutico (loan)	41	(4)
2017–2018	América Mineiro	53	(7)
2018	CRB	9	(1)
2019	Botafogo SP	7	(0)
2019–2020	Sūduva	27	(7)
2021–	Remo	4	(0)

International career
2009	Brazil U20		
- * Club domestic league appearances and goals as of 14 November 2020

Renan Henrique Oliveira Vieira (born 29 December 1989, in Itabira), or simply Renan Oliveira, is a Brazilian footballer who plays for Remo, as an attacking midfielder.

He made his professional debut in a 2–3 home defeat to Guarani-MG on 6 April 2008, in the Minas Gerais State Championship. He scored his 1st professional goal in a 3–2 home win over Tupi on 13 April 2008, in the same competition.

== Honours ==
Goiás

- Campeonato Brasileiro Série B: 2012
- Campeonato Goiano: 2013

América Mineiro

- Campeonato Brasileiro Série B: 2017

Sūduva

- A Lyga: 2019
- Lithuanian Football Cup: 2019
